= 2000 Open de España Villa de Madrid – Singles =

Singles
- 2000 Open de España Villa de Madrid

Final
- Champion: (Spain) Gala León García
- Runner-up: (Colombia) Fabiola Zuluaga
- Score: 4–6, 6–2, 6–2

Details
- Draw: 30
- Seeds: 8

Events
Singles	Doubles
← 1999 ·	WTA Madrid Open	· 2001 →

Lindsay Davenport was the reigning champion, but did not compete this year.

Gala León García won the title by defeating Fabiola Zuluaga 4–6, 6–2, 6–2 in the final. It was the 1st and only title in her career.

== Seeds ==
The first two seeds received a bye into the second round.

1. (France) Mary Pierce (second round)
2. (United States) Amy Frazier (second round)
3. (Japan) Ai Sugiyama (second round)
4. (United States) Lisa Raymond (first round)
5. (Austria) Sylvia Plischke (first round)
6. (Argentina) Paola Suárez (second round)
7. (United States) Kristina Brandi (second round)
8. (Spain) Gala León García (champion)

== Draw ==
Key

- Q = Qualifier
- WC = Wild card
- LL = Lucky loser
- Alt = Alternate
- ITF = ITF entry
- PR = Protected ranking
- SR = Special ranking
- SE = Special exempt
- JE = Junior exempt
- JR = Junior Accelerator Programme entrant
- CO = College Accelerator Programme entrant
- NG = Next Gen Accelerator Program entrant
- w/o = Walkover
- r = Retired
- d = Defaulted

=== Finals ===
Semifinals
WC	(Croatia) Iva Majoli	3	4
(Colombia) Fabiola Zuluaga	6	6
8	(Spain) Gala León García	6	6
WC	(Spain) Virginia Ruano Pascual	2	0

Final
(Colombia) Fabiola Zuluaga	6	2	2
8	(Spain) Gala León García	4	6	6

=== Top half ===
First round
(Belarus) O Barabanschikova	6	4	4
Q	(Italy) G Di Natale	0	6	6
(Austria) P Wartusch	3	7	5
WC	(Croatia) I Majoli	6	5	7
(Slovenia) K Srebotnik	4	6^{5}
7	(United States) K Brandi	6	7^{7}
3	(Japan) A Sugiyama	7	7
(Spain) M Sánchez Lorenzo	5	5
(Spain) M Serna	6	4	3
(Colombia) F Zuluaga	4	6	6
(Spain) C Torrens Valero	6^{8}	5
(Canada) M Drake	7^{10}	7
(Sweden) Å Carlsson	7^{7}	6
5	(Austria) S Plischke	6^{2}	2

Second round
1	(France) M Pierce	4	4
Q	(Italy) G Di Natale	6	6
WC	(Croatia) I Majoli	6	5	7^{7}
7	(United States) K Brandi	3	7	6^{1}
3	(Japan) A Sugiyama	2	4
(Colombia) F Zuluaga	6	6
(Canada) M Drake	2	0
(Sweden) Å Carlsson	6	6

Quarterfinals
Q	(Italy) G Di Natale	1	0^{r}
WC	(Croatia) I Majoli	6	1
(Colombia) F Zuluaga	6	6
(Sweden) Å Carlsson	2	4

Semifinals
WC	(Croatia) I Majoli	3	4
(Colombia) F Zuluaga	6	6

=== Bottom half ===
First round
8	(Spain) G León García	6	6
(United States) M Shaughnessy	0	1
LL	(United States) S Reeves	4	1
(Italy) R Grande	6	6
Q	(Spain) G Riera	6	6^{1}	6
(Slovakia) K Habšudová	3	7^{7}	4
(Spain) Á Montolio	5	6	6
4	(United States) L Raymond	7	3	0
6	(Argentina) P Suárez	6	6
(United States) E deLone	2	2
Q	(Spain) L Domínguez Lino	7^{7}	2	2
(Australia) N Pratt	6^{2}	6	6
WC	(Spain) V Ruano Pascual	4	6	6
Q	(Spain) A Medina Garrigues	6	3	2

Second round
8	(Spain) G León García	6	6
(Italy) R Grande	4	4
Q	(Spain) G Riera	2	2
(Spain) Á Montolio	6	6
6	(Argentina) P Suárez	7	0^{r}
(Australia) N Pratt	5	5
WC	(Spain) V Ruano Pascual	6	6
2	(United States) A Frazier	2	2

Quarterfinals
8	(Spain) G León García	6	6
(Spain) Á Montolio	4	3
(Australia) N Pratt	3	6	2
WC	(Spain) V Ruano Pascual	6	1	6

Semifinals
8	(Spain) G León García	6	6
WC	(Spain) V Ruano Pascual	2	0
