= 1999 WTA Madrid Open – Singles =

Singles
- 1999 WTA Madrid Open

Final
- Champion: (United States) Lindsay Davenport
- Runner-up: (Argentina) Paola Suárez
- Score: 6–1, 6–3

Details
- Draw: 30
- Seeds: 8

Events
Singles	Doubles
← 1998 ·	WTA Madrid Open	· 2000 →

The 1999 WTA Madrid Open singles was the singles event of the fourth edition of the Madrid Open, a WTA Tier III tournament held in Madrid, Spain and part of the European clay court season. Patty Schnyder was the defending champion but she was defeated in the second round by Paola Suárez.

First seed Lindsay Davenport won the title, defeating Suárez in the final.

== Seeds ==
The top two seeds received a bye to the second round.

1. (United States) Lindsay Davenport (champion)
2. (Switzerland) Patty Schnyder (second round)
3. (Belgium) Dominique Van Roost (withdrew)
4. (United States) Chanda Rubin (semifinals)
5. (Italy) Silvia Farina (quarterfinals)
6. (Spain) Magüi Serna (quarterfinals)
7. (United States) Amy Frazier (semifinals)
8. (Spain) Virginia Ruano Pascual (first round)
9. (Israel) Anna Smashnova (quarterfinals)

== Draw ==
=== Key ===
- Q = Qualifier
- WC = Wild card
- LL = Lucky loser
- Alt = Alternate
- ITF = ITF entry
- PR = Protected ranking
- SR = Special ranking
- SE = Special exempt
- JE = Junior exempt
- JR = Junior Accelerator Programme entrant
- CO = College Accelerator Programme entrant
- NG = Next Gen Accelerator Program entrant
- w/o = Walkover
- r = Retired
- d = Defaulted

=== Finals ===
Semifinals
1	(United States) Lindsay Davenport	6	6
7	(United States) Amy Frazier	0	2
4	(United States) Chanda Rubin	5	6	1
LL	(Argentina) Paola Suárez	7	2	6

Final
1	(United States) Lindsay Davenport	6	6
LL	(Argentina) Paola Suárez	1	3

=== Top half ===
First round
(Spain) G León García	6	6
(United States) J Chi	1	0
Q	(Australia) N Pratt	6	7
(Hungary) R Kuti-Kis	4	5
(Colombia) F Zuluaga	4	3
9	(Israel) A Smashnova	6	6
5	(Italy) S Farina	6	6
(Croatia) S Talaja	4	4
(Italy) R Grande	6	7
WC	(Spain) M Marrero	2	6
(Belarus) O Barabanschikova	6	6
(United States) K Po	3	3
(Spain) M Sánchez Lorenzo	3	6	5
7	(United States) A Frazier	6	2	7

Second round
1	(United States) L Davenport	2	6	6
(Spain) G León García	6	3	1
Q	(Australia) N Pratt	0	1
9	(Israel) A Smashnova	6	6
5	(Italy) S Farina	6	6
(Italy) R Grande	2	4
(Belarus) O Barabanschikova	2	2
7	(United States) A Frazier	6	6

Quarterfinals
1	(United States) L Davenport	6	6
9	(Israel) A Smashnova	1	3
5	(Italy) S Farina	6	6	4
7	(United States) A Frazier	7	3	6

Semifinals
1	(United States) L Davenport	6	6
7	(United States) A Frazier	0	2

=== Bottom half ===
First round
8	(Spain) V Ruano Pascual	6	4	4
(United States) T Snyder	3	6	6
(United States) M Shaughnessy	4	0
Q	(Switzerland) E Gagliardi	6	6
(Germany) M Weingärtner	5	6	6
(Puerto Rico) K Brandi	7	4	2
(United States) B Rippner	4	2
4	(United States) C Rubin	6	6
6	(Spain) M Serna	6	6
(Spain) C Rodríguez	3	1
Q	(Spain) G Riera	0	2
LL	(Spain) RM Andrés Rodríguez	6	6
LL	(Argentina) P Suárez	6	3	6
Q	(Romania) R Sandu	4	6	1

Second round
(United States) T Snyder	7	1	1
Q	(Switzerland) E Gagliardi	6	6	6
(Germany) M Weingärtner	1	4
4	(United States) C Rubin	6	6
6	(Spain) M Serna	6	3	6
LL	(Spain) RM Andrés Rodríguez	3	6	4
LL	(Argentina) P Suárez	6	6
2	(Switzerland) P Schnyder	2	0

Quarterfinals
Q	(Switzerland) E Gagliardi	0	2
4	(United States) C Rubin	6	6
6	(Spain) M Serna	4	2
LL	(Argentina) P Suárez	6	6

Semifinals
4	(United States) C Rubin	5	6	1
LL	(Argentina) P Suárez	7	2	6

== Qualifying ==
=== Seeds ===
1. (Switzerland) Emmanuelle Gagliardi (qualifier)
2. (Australia) Nicole Pratt (qualifier)
3. (Argentina) Mariana Díaz Oliva (first round)
4. n.a.
5. (Italy) Adriana Serra Zanetti (first round)
6. (Argentina) Paola Suárez (qualifying competition, lucky loser)
7. (Spain) Conchita Martínez Granados (second round, retired)
8. (Romania) Raluca Sandu (qualifier)
9. (Spain) Gisela Riera (qualifier)

=== Qualifiers ===
1. (Switzerland) Emmanuelle Gagliardi
2. (Spain) Gisela Riera
3. (Romania) Raluca Sandu
4. (Australia) Nicole Pratt

=== Lucky losers ===
1. (Argentina) Paola Suárez
2. (Spain) Rosa María Andrés Rodríguez

== Qualifying draw ==
=== Key ===
- Q = Qualifier
- WC = Wild card
- LL = Lucky loser
- Alt = Alternate
- ITF = ITF entry
- PR = Protected ranking
- SR = Special ranking
- SE = Special exempt
- JE = Junior exempt
- JR = Junior Accelerator Programme entrant
- CO = College Accelerator Programme entrant
- NG = Next Gen Accelerator Program entrant
- w/o = Walkover
- r = Retired
- d = Defaulted

=== First qualifier ===
First round
1	(Switzerland) Emmanuelle Gagliardi	6	6	6
(Czech Republic) Michaela Paštiková	4	7	3
(Italy) Maria Paola Zavagli	7	2	1
WC	(Spain) Anabel Medina Garrigues	5	6	6
(Spain) Mariam Ramón Climent	6	6
(Italy) Alice Canepa	2	3
WC	(Spain) María Nieto	0	0
7	(Spain) Conchita Martínez Granados	6	6

Second round
1	(Switzerland) Emmanuelle Gagliardi	7	6
WC	(Spain) Anabel Medina Garrigues	6	3
(Spain) Mariam Ramón Climent	6	4
7	(Spain) Conchita Martínez Granados	4	2^{r}

Qualifying competition
1	(Switzerland) Emmanuelle Gagliardi	6	6
(Spain) Mariam Ramón Climent	3	3

=== Second qualifier ===
First round
9	(Spain) Gisela Riera	4	6	7
(Spain) Alicia Ortuño	6	4	6
(Poland) Katarzyna Strączy	3	3
WC	(Spain) Ainhoa Goñi Blanco	6	6
(Paraguay) Larissa Schaerer	6	6
WC	(Spain) Virginia Romero Barrio	4	0
WC	(Ukraine) Julia Vakulenko	7	6	2
6	(Argentina) Paola Suárez	6	7	6

Second round
9	(Spain) Gisela Riera	6	6
WC	(Spain) Ainhoa Goñi Blanco	4	2
(Paraguay) Larissa Schaerer	1	5
6	(Argentina) Paola Suárez	6	7

Qualifying competition
9	(Spain) Gisela Riera	6	6
6	(Argentina) Paola Suárez	4	2

=== Third qualifier ===
First round
8	(Romania) Raluca Sandu	6	6
(United States) Katie Schlukebir	2	1
Alt	(Japan) Keiko Nagatomi	1	6
(Bulgaria) Svetlana Krivencheva	6	7
(Australia) Rachel McQuillan	7	7
(United Kingdom) Lucie Ahl	5	5
(Czech Republic) Ludmila Richterová	6	6
3	(Argentina) Mariana Díaz Oliva	4	3

Second round
8	(Romania) Raluca Sandu	3	6	6
(Bulgaria) Svetlana Krivencheva	6	3	2
(Australia) Rachel McQuillan	3	4
(Czech Republic) Ludmila Richterová	6	6

Qualifying competition
8	(Romania) Raluca Sandu	6	6
(Czech Republic) Ludmila Richterová	4	3

=== Fourth qualifier ===
First round
5	(Italy) Adriana Serra Zanetti	7	4	6
(United States) Debbie Graham	5	6	7
(Spain) Rosa María Andrés Rodríguez	6	6
(Argentina) María Fernanda Landa	4	0
(Italy) Germana Di Natale	3	6	6
(Australia) Bryanne Stewart	6	2	1
(Brazil) Vanessa Menga	6	4	2
2	(Australia) Nicole Pratt	3	6	6

Second round
(United States) Debbie Graham	4	4
(Spain) Rosa María Andrés Rodríguez	6	6
(Italy) Germana Di Natale	6	2
2	(Australia) Nicole Pratt	7	6

Qualifying competition
(Spain) Rosa María Andrés Rodríguez	2	2
2	(Australia) Nicole Pratt	6	6
