= 2000 WTA Tour =

Women's tennis circuit

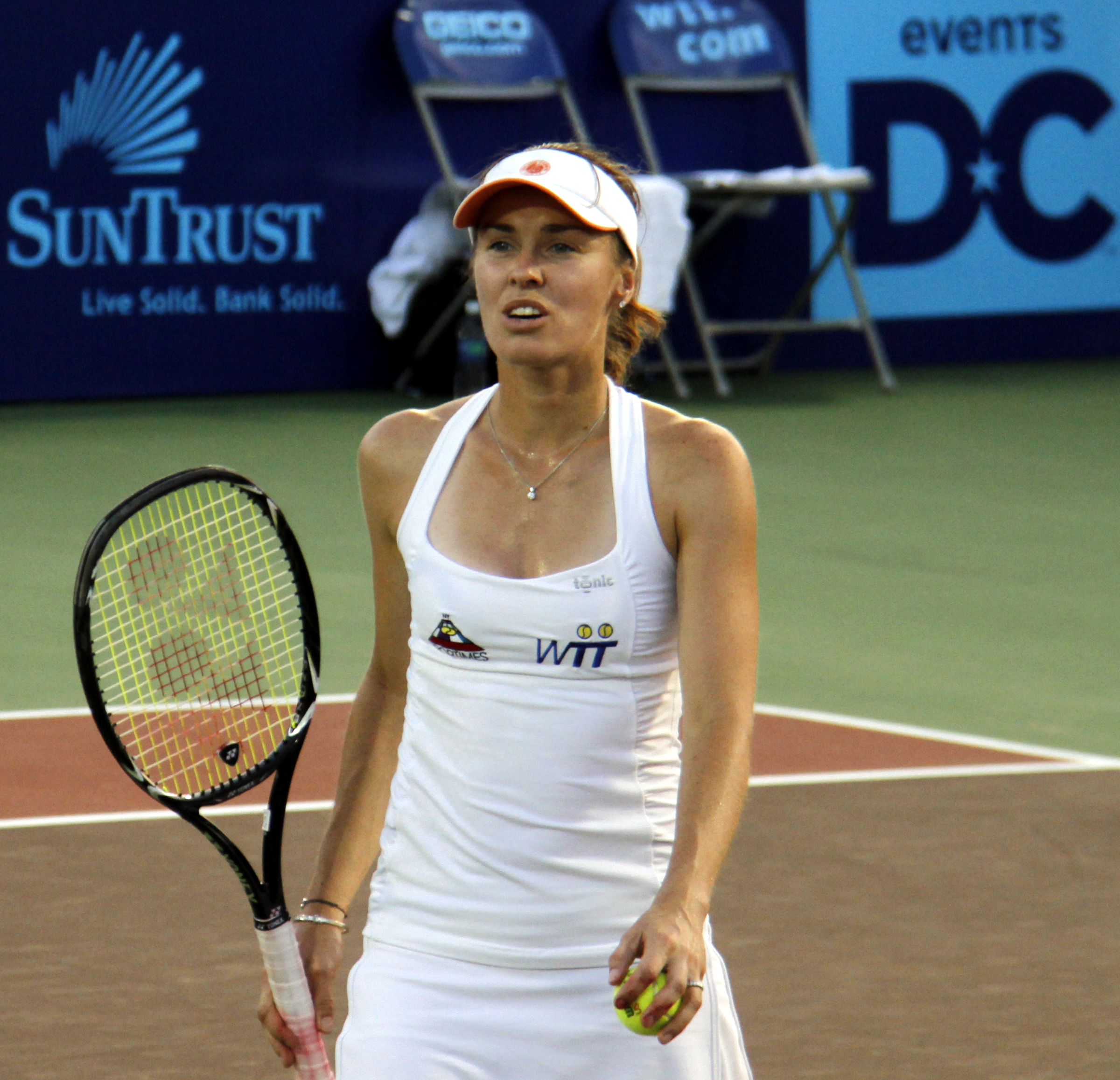
- Martina Hingis finished the year as WTA world No. 1 for the third time in her career, though Venus Williams was named the Player of the Year. Hingis won nine tournaments during the season, including the WTA Tour Championships, and finished runner-up at a major at the Australian Open. Williams won six singles tournaments during the season, including two majors at the Wimbledon Championships and the US Open, the gold medal at the Sydney Olympics, and a Tier I event.

Details
- Duration: January 1 – November 27, 2000
- Edition: 30th
- Tournaments: 58
- Categories: Grand Slam (4); WTA Championships; Summer Olympics; WTA Tier I (9); WTA Tier II (16); WTA Tier III (13); WTA Tier IV (14)

Achievements (singles)
- Most titles: (Switzerland) Martina Hingis (9)
- Most finals: (Switzerland) Martina Hingis (13)
- Prize money leader: (Switzerland) Martina Hingis (US$3,457,049)
- Points leader: (Switzerland) Martina Hingis (6,044)

Awards
- Player of the year: (United States) Venus Williams
- Doubles team of the year: (United States) Serena Williams (United States) Venus Williams
- Most improved player of the year: (Russia) Elena Dementieva
- Newcomer of the year: (Czech Republic) Dája Bedáňová
- Comeback player of the year: (Croatia) Iva Majoli

The 2000 Sanex WTA Tour was the 30th season since the founding of the Women's Tennis Association. It commenced on January 3, 2000, and concluded on November 13, 2000, after 58 events. For this season, a new event was added: the State Farm Classic in Scottsdale, Arizona, U.S. It also saw the return of the China Open which was moved to Shanghai, after last being held in Beijing in 1996.

Martina Hingis finished the season as the number one ranked player for the third time in four years, and second year in a row. However, this was the first year she finished number one without winning a Grand Slam women's singles title. Hingis led the titles list with nine throughout the season, including the prestigious WTA Tour Championships. Venus Williams won the most Grand Slam titles with two, and finished the year as the No. 3 player in the world. Williams also won the Olympic gold medal in Sydney that year, and was awarded the Player of the Year award by the WTA. Mary Pierce won her second Grand Slam title five years after her last, becoming the first Frenchwoman to win at home since Françoise Dürr in 1967. Lindsay Davenport also picked up her third and last Grand Slam title at the Australian Open.

In doubles competition, the Grand Slam titles were split between four teams: Lisa Raymond and Rennae Stubbs, Martina Hingis and Mary Pierce, Serena Williams and Venus Williams, and Julie Halard-Decugis and Ai Sugiyama. The Williams sisters also won the Olympic gold medal, and were thus awarded Doubles Team of the Year at the WTA Awards.

== Schedule ==
The table below shows the 2000 WTA Tour schedule.

Key

Grand Slam events
Summer Olympic Games
Year-end championships
Tier I events
Tier II events
Tier III events
Tier IV events
Team events

=== January ===
Week	Tournament	Champions	Runners-up	Semifinalists	Quarterfinalists
3 Jan	Hopman Cup; Perth, Australia; Hopman Cup; Hard (i) – 8 teams (RR)	South Africa; 3–0	Thailand	Round robin losers (Group A) Australia; Austria; Slovakia	Round robin losers (Group B) Sweden; United States; Belgium
3 Jan	Thalgo Hardcourts Championships; Gold Coast, Australia; Tier III event Hard – $170,000 – 30S/32Q/16D; Singles – Doubles	(Croatia) Silvija Talaja; 6–0, 0–6, 6–4	(Spain) Conchita Martínez	(France) Nathalie Dechy (Spain) Arantxa Sánchez Vicario	(Bulgaria) Magdalena Maleeva (Belgium) Sabine Appelmans (Switzerland) Patty Schnyder (Russia) Anna Kournikova
3 Jan	Thalgo Hardcourts Championships; Gold Coast, Australia; Tier III event Hard – $170,000 – 30S/32Q/16D; Singles – Doubles	(France) Julie Halard-Decugis (Russia) Anna Kournikova; 6–3, 6–0	(Belgium) Sabine Appelmans (Italy) Rita Grande	(France) Nathalie Dechy (Spain) Arantxa Sánchez Vicario	(Bulgaria) Magdalena Maleeva (Belgium) Sabine Appelmans (Switzerland) Patty Schnyder (Russia) Anna Kournikova
3 Jan	ASB Bank Classic; Auckland, New Zealand; Tier IV event Hard – $110,000 – 32S/32Q/16D; Singles – Doubles	(Luxembourg) Anne Kremer; 6–4, 6–4	(Zimbabwe) Cara Black	(Netherlands) Amanda Hopmans (United States) Meghann Shaughnessy	(Russia) Elena Likhovtseva (Switzerland) Miroslava Vavrinec (Israel) Anna Smashnova (Argentina) Paola Suárez
3 Jan	ASB Bank Classic; Auckland, New Zealand; Tier IV event Hard – $110,000 – 32S/32Q/16D; Singles – Doubles	(Zimbabwe) Cara Black (France) Alexandra Fusai; 3–6, 6–3, 6–4	(Austria) Barbara Schwartz (Austria) Patricia Wartusch	(Netherlands) Amanda Hopmans (United States) Meghann Shaughnessy	(Russia) Elena Likhovtseva (Switzerland) Miroslava Vavrinec (Israel) Anna Smashnova (Argentina) Paola Suárez
10 Jan	Adidas International; Sydney, Australia; Tier II event Hard – $460,000 – 28S/32Q/16D; Singles – Doubles	(France) Amélie Mauresmo; 7–6^{(7–2)}, 6–4	(United States) Lindsay Davenport	(Switzerland) Martina Hingis (Russia) Anna Kournikova	(Belgium) Dominique van Roost (France) Mary Pierce (United States) Alexandra Stevenson (Spain) Arantxa Sánchez Vicario
10 Jan	Adidas International; Sydney, Australia; Tier II event Hard – $460,000 – 28S/32Q/16D; Singles – Doubles	(France) Julie Halard-Decugis (Japan) Ai Sugiyama; 6–0, 6–3	(Switzerland) Martina Hingis (France) Mary Pierce	(Switzerland) Martina Hingis (Russia) Anna Kournikova	(Belgium) Dominique van Roost (France) Mary Pierce (United States) Alexandra Stevenson (Spain) Arantxa Sánchez Vicario
10 Jan	ANZ Tasmanian International; Hobart, Australia; Tier IV event Hard – $110,000 – 32S/32Q/16D; Singles – Doubles	(Belgium) Kim Clijsters; 2–6, 6–2, 6–2	(United States) Chanda Rubin	(United States) Amy Frazier (Venezuela) María Vento	(Romania) Cătălina Cristea (Belgium) Justine Henin (Canada) Maureen Drake (France) Sarah Pitkowski
10 Jan	ANZ Tasmanian International; Hobart, Australia; Tier IV event Hard – $110,000 – 32S/32Q/16D; Singles – Doubles	(Italy) Rita Grande (France) Émilie Loit; 6–2, 2–6, 6–3	(Belgium) Kim Clijsters (Australia) Alicia Molik	(United States) Amy Frazier (Venezuela) María Vento	(Romania) Cătălina Cristea (Belgium) Justine Henin (Canada) Maureen Drake (France) Sarah Pitkowski
17 Jan; 24 Jan	Australian Open; Melbourne, Australia; Grand Slam; Hard – $3,156,711 – 128S/96Q/64D/32X; Singles – Doubles – Mixed doubles	(United States) Lindsay Davenport; 6–1, 7–5	(Switzerland) Martina Hingis	(Spain) Conchita Martínez (United States) Jennifer Capriati	(Spain) Arantxa Sánchez Vicario (Russia) Elena Likhovtseva (Japan) Ai Sugiyama (France) Julie Halard-Decugis
17 Jan; 24 Jan	Australian Open; Melbourne, Australia; Grand Slam; Hard – $3,156,711 – 128S/96Q/64D/32X; Singles – Doubles – Mixed doubles	(United States) Lisa Raymond (Australia) Rennae Stubbs; 6–4, 5–7, 6–4	(Switzerland) Martina Hingis (France) Mary Pierce	(Spain) Conchita Martínez (United States) Jennifer Capriati	(Spain) Arantxa Sánchez Vicario (Russia) Elena Likhovtseva (Japan) Ai Sugiyama (France) Julie Halard-Decugis
17 Jan; 24 Jan	Australian Open; Melbourne, Australia; Grand Slam; Hard – $3,156,711 – 128S/96Q/64D/32X; Singles – Doubles – Mixed doubles	(United States) Jared Palmer (Australia) Rennae Stubbs; 7–5, 7–6^{(7–3)}	(Australia) Todd Woodbridge (Spain) Arantxa Sánchez Vicario	(Spain) Conchita Martínez (United States) Jennifer Capriati	(Spain) Arantxa Sánchez Vicario (Russia) Elena Likhovtseva (Japan) Ai Sugiyama (France) Julie Halard-Decugis
31 Jan	Toray Pan Pacific Open; Tokyo, Japan; Tier I event Carpet (i) – $1,080,000 – 28S/32Q/16D; Singles – Doubles	(Switzerland) Martina Hingis; 6–3, 7–5	(France) Sandrine Testud	(United States) Chanda Rubin (Slovenia) Katarina Srebotnik	(Russia) Anna Kournikova (South Africa) Amanda Coetzer (France) Nathalie Tauziat (United States) Lilia Osterloh
31 Jan	Toray Pan Pacific Open; Tokyo, Japan; Tier I event Carpet (i) – $1,080,000 – 28S/32Q/16D; Singles – Doubles	(Switzerland) Martina Hingis (France) Mary Pierce; 6–4, 6–1	(France) Alexandra Fusai (France) Nathalie Tauziat	(United States) Chanda Rubin (Slovenia) Katarina Srebotnik	(Russia) Anna Kournikova (South Africa) Amanda Coetzer (France) Nathalie Tauziat (United States) Lilia Osterloh

=== February ===
Week	Tournament	Champions	Runners-up	Semifinalists	Quarterfinalists
7 Feb	Open Gaz de France; Paris, France; Tier II event Carpet (i) – $535,000 – 28S/32Q/16D; Singles – Doubles	(France) Nathalie Tauziat; 7–5, 6–2	(United States) Serena Williams	(France) Julie Halard-Decugis (Russia) Anna Kournikova	(France) Sarah Pitkowski (France) Nathalie Dechy (Romania) Irina Spîrlea (France) Anne-Gaëlle Sidot
7 Feb	Open Gaz de France; Paris, France; Tier II event Carpet (i) – $535,000 – 28S/32Q/16D; Singles – Doubles	(France) Julie Halard-Decugis (France) Sandrine Testud; 3–6, 6–3, 6–4	(Sweden) Åsa Carlsson (France) Émilie Loit	(France) Julie Halard-Decugis (Russia) Anna Kournikova	(France) Sarah Pitkowski (France) Nathalie Dechy (Romania) Irina Spîrlea (France) Anne-Gaëlle Sidot
7 Feb	Copa Colsanitas; Bogotá, Colombia; Tier IV event Clay – $140,000 – 32S/32Q/16D; Singles – Doubles	(Austria) Patricia Wartusch; 4–6, 6–1, 6–4	(Italy) Tathiana Garbin	(Austria) Sylvia Plischke (Hungary) Rita Kuti-Kis	(Belarus) Olga Barabanschikova (Argentina) Paola Suárez (Spain) Nuria Llagostera (United States) Meghann Shaughnessy
7 Feb	Copa Colsanitas; Bogotá, Colombia; Tier IV event Clay – $140,000 – 32S/32Q/16D; Singles – Doubles	(Argentina) Laura Montalvo (Argentina) Paola Suárez; 6–4, 6–2	(Hungary) Rita Kuti-Kis (Hungary) Petra Mandula	(Austria) Sylvia Plischke (Hungary) Rita Kuti-Kis	(Belarus) Olga Barabanschikova (Argentina) Paola Suárez (Spain) Nuria Llagostera (United States) Meghann Shaughnessy
14 Feb	Faber Grand Prix; Hanover, Germany; Tier II event Hard (i) – $535,000 – 28S/32Q/16D; Singles – Doubles	(United States) Serena Williams; 6–1, 6–1	(Czech Republic) Denisa Chládková	(France) Amélie Mauresmo (France) Anne-Gaëlle Sidot	(Switzerland) Patty Schnyder (Israel) Anna Smashnova (Luxembourg) Anne Kremer (Netherlands) Kristie Boogert
14 Feb	Faber Grand Prix; Hanover, Germany; Tier II event Hard (i) – $535,000 – 28S/32Q/16D; Singles – Doubles	(Sweden) Åsa Carlsson (Belarus) Natasha Zvereva; 6–3, 6–4	(Italy) Silvia Farina Elia (Slovakia) Karina Habšudová	(France) Amélie Mauresmo (France) Anne-Gaëlle Sidot	(Switzerland) Patty Schnyder (Israel) Anna Smashnova (Luxembourg) Anne Kremer (Netherlands) Kristie Boogert
14 Feb	WTA Brasil Open; São Paulo, Brazil; Tier IV event Clay – $140,000 – 32S/32Q/16D; Singles – Doubles	(Hungary) Rita Kuti-Kis; 4–6, 6–4, 7–5	(Argentina) Paola Suárez	(South Africa) Joannette Kruger (Switzerland) Emmanuelle Gagliardi	(Austria) Sylvia Plischke (Spain) Cristina Torrens Valero (Germany) Anca Barna (Austria) Patricia Wartusch
14 Feb	WTA Brasil Open; São Paulo, Brazil; Tier IV event Clay – $140,000 – 32S/32Q/16D; Singles – Doubles	(Argentina) Laura Montalvo (Argentina) Paola Suárez; 5–7, 6–4, 6–3	(Slovakia) Janette Husárová (Argentina) Florencia Labat	(South Africa) Joannette Kruger (Switzerland) Emmanuelle Gagliardi	(Austria) Sylvia Plischke (Spain) Cristina Torrens Valero (Germany) Anca Barna (Austria) Patricia Wartusch
21 Feb	IGA Superthrift Classic; Oklahoma City, United States; Tier III event Hard (i) – $170,000 – 30S/32Q/16D; Singles – Doubles	(United States) Monica Seles; 6–1, 7–6^{(7–3)}	(France) Nathalie Dechy	(Italy) Rita Grande (South Africa) Amanda Coetzer	(Russia) Tatiana Panova (United States) Amy Frazier (United States) Lisa Raymond (France) Sarah Pitkowski
21 Feb	IGA Superthrift Classic; Oklahoma City, United States; Tier III event Hard (i) – $170,000 – 30S/32Q/16D; Singles – Doubles	(United States) Corina Morariu (United States) Kimberly Po; 6–4, 4–6, 6–2	(Thailand) Tamarine Tanasugarn (Ukraine) Elena Tatarkova	(Italy) Rita Grande (South Africa) Amanda Coetzer	(Russia) Tatiana Panova (United States) Amy Frazier (United States) Lisa Raymond (France) Sarah Pitkowski
28 Feb	State Farm Classic; Scottsdale, United States; Tier II event Hard – $535,000 – 28S/32Q/16D; Singles – Doubles	(Switzerland) Martina Hingis vs (United States) Lindsay Davenport (cancelled due to rain)		(France) Mary Pierce (Russia) Anna Kournikova	(France) Sandrine Testud (France) Nathalie Dechy (Japan) Ai Sugiyama (United States) Monica Seles
28 Feb	State Farm Classic; Scottsdale, United States; Tier II event Hard – $535,000 – 28S/32Q/16D; Singles – Doubles	(Zimbabwe) Cara Black / (Kazakhstan) Irina Selyutina vs N/A (other semifinal not played due to rain)		(France) Mary Pierce (Russia) Anna Kournikova	(France) Sandrine Testud (France) Nathalie Dechy (Japan) Ai Sugiyama (United States) Monica Seles

=== March ===
Week	Tournament	Champions	Runners-up	Semifinalists	Quarterfinalists
6 Mar	Tennis Masters Series; Indian Wells, United States; Tier I event Hard – $2,000,000 – 80S/32Q/32D; Singles – Doubles	(United States) Lindsay Davenport; 4–6, 6–4, 6–0	(Switzerland) Martina Hingis	(France) Mary Pierce (Russia) Elena Dementieva	(United States) Monica Seles (United States) Serena Williams (United States) Chanda Rubin (Spain) Conchita Martínez
6 Mar	Tennis Masters Series; Indian Wells, United States; Tier I event Hard – $2,000,000 – 80S/32Q/32D; Singles – Doubles	(United States) Lindsay Davenport (United States) Corina Morariu; 6–2, 6–3	(Russia) Anna Kournikova (Belarus) Natasha Zvereva	(France) Mary Pierce (Russia) Elena Dementieva	(United States) Monica Seles (United States) Serena Williams (United States) Chanda Rubin (Spain) Conchita Martínez
20 Mar	Ericsson Open; Key Biscayne, United States; Tier I event Hard – $2,525,000 – 96S/64Q/48D; Singles – Doubles	(Switzerland) Martina Hingis; 6–3, 6–2	(United States) Lindsay Davenport	(United States) Monica Seles (France) Sandrine Testud	(South Africa) Amanda Coetzer (United States) Amy Frazier (United States) Jennifer Capriati (Russia) Nadejda Petrova
20 Mar	Ericsson Open; Key Biscayne, United States; Tier I event Hard – $2,525,000 – 96S/64Q/48D; Singles – Doubles	(France) Julie Halard-Decugis (Japan) Ai Sugiyama; 4–6, 7–5, 6–4	(United States) Nicole Arendt (Netherlands) Manon Bollegraf	(United States) Monica Seles (France) Sandrine Testud	(South Africa) Amanda Coetzer (United States) Amy Frazier (United States) Jennifer Capriati (Russia) Nadejda Petrova

=== April ===
Week	Tournament	Champions	Runners-up	Semifinalists	Quarterfinalists
10 Apr	Bausch & Lomb Championships; Amelia Island, United States; Tier II event $535,000 – clay (green) – 56S/32Q/28D; Singles – Doubles	(United States) Monica Seles; 6–3, 6–2	(Spain) Conchita Martínez	(Russia) Elena Likhovtseva (Argentina) Paola Suárez	(France) Mary Pierce (Austria) Barbara Schett (Spain) Arantxa Sánchez Vicario (Russia) Anna Kournikova
10 Apr	Bausch & Lomb Championships; Amelia Island, United States; Tier II event $535,000 – clay (green) – 56S/32Q/28D; Singles – Doubles	Doubles semifinals cancelled due to rain		(Russia) Elena Likhovtseva (Argentina) Paola Suárez	(France) Mary Pierce (Austria) Barbara Schett (Spain) Arantxa Sánchez Vicario (Russia) Anna Kournikova
10 Apr	Estoril Open; Oeiras, Portugal; Tier IV event $140,000 – clay– 32S/32Q/16D; Singles – Doubles	(Germany) Anke Huber; 6–2, 1–6, 7–5	(France) Nathalie Dechy	(Italy) Tathiana Garbin (Italy) Silvia Farina Elia	(Spain) Cristina Torrens Valero (Hungary) Rita Kuti-Kis (Switzerland) Miroslava Vavrinec (Spain) Ángeles Montolio
10 Apr	Estoril Open; Oeiras, Portugal; Tier IV event $140,000 – clay– 32S/32Q/16D; Singles – Doubles	(Slovenia) Tina Križan (Slovenia) Katarina Srebotnik; 6–0, 7–6^{(11–9)}	(Netherlands) Amanda Hopmans (Spain) Cristina Torrens Valero	(Italy) Tathiana Garbin (Italy) Silvia Farina Elia	(Spain) Cristina Torrens Valero (Hungary) Rita Kuti-Kis (Switzerland) Miroslava Vavrinec (Spain) Ángeles Montolio
17 Apr	Family Circle Cup; Hilton Head Island, United States; Tier I event $1,080,000 – clay (green) – 56S/16Q/28D; Singles – Doubles	(France) Mary Pierce; 6–1, 6–0	(Spain) Arantxa Sánchez Vicario	(United States) Monica Seles (Spain) Conchita Martínez	(Australia) Jelena Dokić (Romania) Ruxandra Dragomir (South Africa) Amanda Coetzer (Canada) Jana Nejedly
17 Apr	Family Circle Cup; Hilton Head Island, United States; Tier I event $1,080,000 – clay (green) – 56S/16Q/28D; Singles – Doubles	(Spain) Virginia Ruano Pascual (Argentina) Paola Suárez; 7–5, 6–3	(Spain) Conchita Martínez (Argentina) Patricia Tarabini	(United States) Monica Seles (Spain) Conchita Martínez	(Australia) Jelena Dokić (Romania) Ruxandra Dragomir (South Africa) Amanda Coetzer (Canada) Jana Nejedly
17 Apr	Westel 900 Open; Budapest, Hungary; Tier IV event $140,000 – clay– 32S/32Q/16D; Singles – Doubles	(Italy) Tathiana Garbin; 6–2, 7–6^{(7–4)}	(Netherlands) Kristie Boogert	(Spain) Ángeles Montolio (France) Sarah Pitkowski	(Hungary) Katalin Marosi-Aracama (Switzerland) Miroslava Vavrinec (Belarus) Olga Barabanschikova (Spain) María Sánchez Lorenzo
17 Apr	Westel 900 Open; Budapest, Hungary; Tier IV event $140,000 – clay– 32S/32Q/16D; Singles – Doubles	(Bulgaria) Lubomira Bacheva (Spain) Cristina Torrens Valero; 6–0, 6–2	(Croatia) Jelena Kostanić (Federal Republic of Yugoslavia) Sandra Načuk	(Spain) Ángeles Montolio (France) Sarah Pitkowski	(Hungary) Katalin Marosi-Aracama (Switzerland) Miroslava Vavrinec (Belarus) Olga Barabanschikova (Spain) María Sánchez Lorenzo
24 Apr	Fed Cup: Round robin Bari, Italy – clay(Group A); Bratislava, Slovakia – hard (i) (Group B); Moscow, Russia – (Carpet) (i) (Group C)	Advance to Knockout Stage Spain; Czech Republic; Belgium	Round robin losers (Group A) Germany; Italy; Croatia	Round robin losers (Group B) Switzerland; Austria; Slovakia	Round robin losers (Group C) France; Russia; Austria

=== May ===
Week	Tournament	Champions	Runners-up	Semifinalists	Quarterfinalists
1 May	Betty Barclay Cup; Hamburg, Germany; Tier II event $535,000 – clay– 28S/32Q/16D; Singles – Doubles	(Switzerland) Martina Hingis; 6–3, 6–3	(Spain) Arantxa Sánchez Vicario	(Germany) Anke Huber (South Africa) Amanda Coetzer	(Russia) Anna Kournikova (Spain) Conchita Martínez (Germany) Andrea Glass (United States) Venus Williams
1 May	Betty Barclay Cup; Hamburg, Germany; Tier II event $535,000 – clay– 28S/32Q/16D; Singles – Doubles	(Russia) Anna Kournikova (Belarus) Natasha Zvereva; 6–7^{(5–7)}, 6–2, 6–4	(United States) Nicole Arendt (Netherlands) Manon Bollegraf	(Germany) Anke Huber (South Africa) Amanda Coetzer	(Russia) Anna Kournikova (Spain) Conchita Martínez (Germany) Andrea Glass (United States) Venus Williams
1 May	Croatian Bol Ladies Open; Bol, Croatia; Tier III event $170,000 – clay– 30S/32Q/16D; Singles – Doubles	(Slovenia) Tina Pisnik; 7–6^{(7–4)}, 7–6^{(7–2)}	(France) Amélie Mauresmo	(Spain) Gala León García (Spain) María Sánchez Lorenzo	(Argentina) Paola Suárez (United States) Corina Morariu (Spain) Ángeles Montolio (France) Sandrine Testud
1 May	Croatian Bol Ladies Open; Bol, Croatia; Tier III event $170,000 – clay– 30S/32Q/16D; Singles – Doubles	(France) Julie Halard-Decugis (United States) Corina Morariu; 6–2, 6–2	(Slovenia) Tina Križan (Slovenia) Katarina Srebotnik	(Spain) Gala León García (Spain) María Sánchez Lorenzo	(Argentina) Paola Suárez (United States) Corina Morariu (Spain) Ángeles Montolio (France) Sandrine Testud
8 May	German Open; Berlin, Germany; Tier I event $1,080,000 – clay– 56S/32Q/28D; Singles – Doubles	(Spain) Conchita Martínez; 6–1, 6–2	(South Africa) Amanda Coetzer	(Switzerland) Martina Hingis (South Africa) Joannette Kruger	(France) Sandrine Testud (Spain) Gala León García (Germany) Anke Huber (Russia) Elena Dementieva
8 May	German Open; Berlin, Germany; Tier I event $1,080,000 – clay– 56S/32Q/28D; Singles – Doubles	(Spain) Conchita Martínez (Spain) Arantxa Sánchez Vicario; 3–6, 6–2, 7–6^{(9–7)}	(South Africa) Amanda Coetzer (United States) Corina Morariu	(Switzerland) Martina Hingis (South Africa) Joannette Kruger	(France) Sandrine Testud (Spain) Gala León García (Germany) Anke Huber (Russia) Elena Dementieva
8 May	Warsaw Cup by Heros; Warsaw, Poland; Tier IV event $110,000 – clay– 32S/32Q/16D; Singles – Doubles	(Slovakia) Henrieta Nagyová; 2–6, 6–4, 7–5	(Netherlands) Amanda Hopmans	(United States) Jennifer Hopkins (Netherlands) Miriam Oremans	(Spain) Cristina Torrens Valero (Italy) Tathiana Garbin (Belarus) Olga Barabanschikova (Germany) Jana Kandarr
8 May	Warsaw Cup by Heros; Warsaw, Poland; Tier IV event $110,000 – clay– 32S/32Q/16D; Singles – Doubles	(Italy) Tathiana Garbin (Slovakia) Janette Husárová; 6–3, 6–1	(Uzbekistan) Iroda Tulyaganova (Ukraine) Anna Zaporozhanova	(United States) Jennifer Hopkins (Netherlands) Miriam Oremans	(Spain) Cristina Torrens Valero (Italy) Tathiana Garbin (Belarus) Olga Barabanschikova (Germany) Jana Kandarr
15 May	Italian Open; Rome, Italy; Tier I event $1,080,000 – clay– 56S/32Q/28D; Singles – Doubles	(United States) Monica Seles; 6–2, 7–6^{(7–4)}	(France) Amélie Mauresmo	(United States) Corina Morariu (Colombia) Fabiola Zuluaga	(Italy) Giulia Casoni (Australia) Jelena Dokić (Spain) Arantxa Sánchez Vicario (France) Nathalie Tauziat
15 May	Italian Open; Rome, Italy; Tier I event $1,080,000 – clay– 56S/32Q/28D; Singles – Doubles	(United States) Lisa Raymond (Australia) Rennae Stubbs; 6–3, 4–6, 6–3	(Spain) Arantxa Sánchez Vicario (Spain) Magüi Serna	(United States) Corina Morariu (Colombia) Fabiola Zuluaga	(Italy) Giulia Casoni (Australia) Jelena Dokić (Spain) Arantxa Sánchez Vicario (France) Nathalie Tauziat
15 May	Mexx Benelux Open; Antwerp, Belgium; Tier IV event $140,000 – clay– 32S/32Q/16D; Singles – Doubles	(South Africa) Amanda Coetzer; 4–6, 6–2, 6–3	(Spain) Cristina Torrens Valero	(Belgium) Laurence Courtois (Croatia) Jelena Kostanić	(United States) Meghann Shaughnessy (Bulgaria) Lubomira Bacheva (Spain) Ángeles Montolio (United States) Jennifer Hopkins
15 May	Mexx Benelux Open; Antwerp, Belgium; Tier IV event $140,000 – clay– 32S/32Q/16D; Singles – Doubles	(Belgium) Sabine Appelmans (Belgium) Kim Clijsters; 6–1, 6–1	(United States) Jennifer Hopkins (Slovenia) Petra Rampre	(Belgium) Laurence Courtois (Croatia) Jelena Kostanić	(United States) Meghann Shaughnessy (Bulgaria) Lubomira Bacheva (Spain) Ángeles Montolio (United States) Jennifer Hopkins
22 May	Internationaux de Strasbourg; Strasbourg, France; Tier III event $170,000 – clay– 30S/32Q/16D; Singles – Doubles	(Croatia) Silvija Talaja; 7–5, 4–6, 6–3	(Hungary) Rita Kuti-Kis	(France) Nathalie Dechy (Israel) Anna Smashnova	(France) Nathalie Tauziat (United States) Corina Morariu (United States) Lilia Osterloh (Slovakia) Daniela Hantuchová
22 May	Internationaux de Strasbourg; Strasbourg, France; Tier III event $170,000 – clay– 30S/32Q/16D; Singles – Doubles	(Canada) Sonya Jeyaseelan (Argentina) Florencia Labat; 6–4, 6–3	(South Africa) Kim Grant (Venezuela) María Vento	(France) Nathalie Dechy (Israel) Anna Smashnova	(France) Nathalie Tauziat (United States) Corina Morariu (United States) Lilia Osterloh (Slovakia) Daniela Hantuchová
22 May	Open de España Villa de Madrid; Madrid, Spain; Tier III event $170,000 – clay– 30S/32Q/16D; Singles – Doubles	(Spain) Gala León García; 4–6, 6–2, 6–2	(Colombia) Fabiola Zuluaga	(Croatia) Iva Majoli (Spain) Virginia Ruano Pascual	(Italy) Germana Di Natale (Sweden) Åsa Carlsson (Spain) Ángeles Montolio (Australia) Nicole Pratt
22 May	Open de España Villa de Madrid; Madrid, Spain; Tier III event $170,000 – clay– 30S/32Q/16D; Singles – Doubles	(United States) Lisa Raymond (Australia) Rennae Stubbs; 6–1, 6–3	(Spain) Gala León García (Spain) María Sánchez Lorenzo	(Croatia) Iva Majoli (Spain) Virginia Ruano Pascual	(Italy) Germana Di Natale (Sweden) Åsa Carlsson (Spain) Ángeles Montolio (Australia) Nicole Pratt
29 May; 5 Jun	French Open; Paris, France; Grand Slam; Clay – $4,141,085 – 128S/96Q/64D/32X; Singles – Doubles – Mixed doubles	(France) Mary Pierce; 6–2, 7–5	(Spain) Conchita Martínez	(Switzerland) Martina Hingis (Spain) Arantxa Sánchez Vicario	(United States) Chanda Rubin (United States) Monica Seles (United States) Venus Williams (Spain) Marta Marrero
29 May; 5 Jun	French Open; Paris, France; Grand Slam; Clay – $4,141,085 – 128S/96Q/64D/32X; Singles – Doubles – Mixed doubles	(Switzerland) Martina Hingis (France) Mary Pierce; 6–2, 6–4	(Spain) Virginia Ruano Pascual (Argentina) Paola Suárez	(Switzerland) Martina Hingis (Spain) Arantxa Sánchez Vicario	(United States) Chanda Rubin (United States) Monica Seles (United States) Venus Williams (Spain) Marta Marrero
29 May; 5 Jun	French Open; Paris, France; Grand Slam; Clay – $4,141,085 – 128S/96Q/64D/32X; Singles – Doubles – Mixed doubles	(South Africa) David Adams (South Africa) Mariaan de Swardt; 6–3, 3–6, 6–3	(Australia) Todd Woodbridge (Australia) Rennae Stubbs	(Switzerland) Martina Hingis (Spain) Arantxa Sánchez Vicario	(United States) Chanda Rubin (United States) Monica Seles (United States) Venus Williams (Spain) Marta Marrero

=== June ===
Week	Tournament	Champions	Runners-up	Semifinalists	Quarterfinalists
12 Jun	DFS Classic; Birmingham, Great Britain; Tier III event Grass – $170,000 – 56S/32Q/16D; Singles – Doubles	(United States) Lisa Raymond; 6–2, 6–7^{(7–9)}, 6–4	(Thailand) Tamarine Tanasugarn	(France) Nathalie Tauziat (Zimbabwe) Cara Black	(France) Anne-Gaëlle Sidot (United States) Jennifer Capriati (United States) Kristina Brandi (France) Julie Halard-Decugis
12 Jun	DFS Classic; Birmingham, Great Britain; Tier III event Grass – $170,000 – 56S/32Q/16D; Singles – Doubles	(Australia) Rachel McQuillan (Australia) Lisa McShea; 6–3, 7–6^{(7–5)}	(Zimbabwe) Cara Black (Kazakhstan) Irina Selyutina	(France) Nathalie Tauziat (Zimbabwe) Cara Black	(France) Anne-Gaëlle Sidot (United States) Jennifer Capriati (United States) Kristina Brandi (France) Julie Halard-Decugis
12 Jun	Tashkent Open; Tashkent, Uzbekistan; Tier IV event Hard – $140,000 – 32S/32Q/16D; Singles – Doubles	(Uzbekistan) Iroda Tulyaganova; 6–3, 2–6, 6–3	(Italy) Francesca Schiavone	(China) Yi Jing-Qian (France) Sarah Pitkowski	(Belarus) Tatiana Poutchek (Israel) Tzipora Obziler (Russia) Elena Bovina (Ukraine) Anna Zaporozhanova
12 Jun	Tashkent Open; Tashkent, Uzbekistan; Tier IV event Hard – $140,000 – 32S/32Q/16D; Singles – Doubles	(China) Li Na (China) Li Ting; 3–6, 6–2, 6–4	(Uzbekistan) Iroda Tulyaganova (Ukraine) Anna Zaporozhanova	(China) Yi Jing-Qian (France) Sarah Pitkowski	(Belarus) Tatiana Poutchek (Israel) Tzipora Obziler (Russia) Elena Bovina (Ukraine) Anna Zaporozhanova
19 Jun	Direct Line Championships; Eastbourne, Great Britain; Tier II event Grass – $535,000 – 28S/32Q/16D; Singles – Doubles	(France) Julie Halard-Decugis; 7–6^{(7–4)}, 6–4	(Belgium) Dominique van Roost	(Luxembourg) Anne Kremer (United States) Chanda Rubin	(United States) Lindsay Davenport (South Africa) Amanda Coetzer (Russia) Anna Kournikova (France) Nathalie Tauziat
19 Jun	Direct Line Championships; Eastbourne, Great Britain; Tier II event Grass – $535,000 – 28S/32Q/16D; Singles – Doubles	(Japan) Ai Sugiyama (France) Nathalie Tauziat; 2–6, 6–3, 7–6^{(7–3)}	(United States) Lisa Raymond (Australia) Rennae Stubbs	(Luxembourg) Anne Kremer (United States) Chanda Rubin	(United States) Lindsay Davenport (South Africa) Amanda Coetzer (Russia) Anna Kournikova (France) Nathalie Tauziat
19 Jun	Heineken Trophy 's-Hertogenbosch, Netherlands; Tier III event Grass – $170,000 – 30S/16D; Singles – Doubles	(Switzerland) Martina Hingis; 6–2, 3–0 ret.	(Romania) Ruxandra Dragomir	(United States) Jennifer Capriati (United States) Kristina Brandi	(Zimbabwe) Cara Black (Switzerland) Patty Schnyder (Australia) Nicole Pratt (France) Sandrine Testud
19 Jun	Heineken Trophy 's-Hertogenbosch, Netherlands; Tier III event Grass – $170,000 – 30S/16D; Singles – Doubles	(United States) Erika deLone (Australia) Nicole Pratt; 7–6^{(7–4)}, 4–3 ret.	(Australia) Catherine Barclay (Slovakia) Karina Habšudová	(United States) Jennifer Capriati (United States) Kristina Brandi	(Zimbabwe) Cara Black (Switzerland) Patty Schnyder (Australia) Nicole Pratt (France) Sandrine Testud
26 Jun; 3 Jul	Wimbledon Championships; London, Great Britain; Grand Slam; Grass – $5,235,332 – 128S/96Q/64D/32X; Singles – Doubles – Mixed doubles	(United States) Venus Williams; 6–3, 7–6^{(7–3)}	(United States) Lindsay Davenport	(United States) Serena Williams (Australia) Jelena Dokić	(Switzerland) Martina Hingis (United States) Lisa Raymond (Spain) Magüi Serna (United States) Monica Seles
26 Jun; 3 Jul	Wimbledon Championships; London, Great Britain; Grand Slam; Grass – $5,235,332 – 128S/96Q/64D/32X; Singles – Doubles – Mixed doubles	(United States) Serena Williams (United States) Venus Williams; 6–3, 6–2	(France) Julie Halard-Decugis (Japan) Ai Sugiyama	(United States) Serena Williams (Australia) Jelena Dokić	(Switzerland) Martina Hingis (United States) Lisa Raymond (Spain) Magüi Serna (United States) Monica Seles
26 Jun; 3 Jul	Wimbledon Championships; London, Great Britain; Grand Slam; Grass – $5,235,332 – 128S/96Q/64D/32X; Singles – Doubles – Mixed doubles	(United States) Donald Johnson (United States) Kimberly Po; 6–4, 7–6^{(7–3)}	(Australia) Lleyton Hewitt (Belgium) Kim Clijsters	(United States) Serena Williams (Australia) Jelena Dokić	(Switzerland) Martina Hingis (United States) Lisa Raymond (Spain) Magüi Serna (United States) Monica Seles

=== July ===
Week	Tournament	Champions	Runners-up	Semifinalists	Quarterfinalists
10 Jul	Uniqa Grand Prix; Klagenfurt, Austria; Tier III event Clay – $170,000 – 30S/32Q/16D; Singles – Doubles	(Austria) Barbara Schett; 5–7, 6–4, 6–4	(Switzerland) Patty Schnyder	(Spain) Ángeles Montolio (Czech Republic) Adriana Gerši	(South Africa) Joannette Kruger (Bulgaria) Magdalena Maleeva (Belarus) Natasha Zvereva (Spain) Gala León García
10 Jul	Uniqa Grand Prix; Klagenfurt, Austria; Tier III event Clay – $170,000 – 30S/32Q/16D; Singles – Doubles	(Argentina) Laura Montalvo (Argentina) Paola Suárez; 7–6^{(7–5)}, 6–1	(Austria) Barbara Schett (Switzerland) Patty Schnyder	(Spain) Ángeles Montolio (Czech Republic) Adriana Gerši	(South Africa) Joannette Kruger (Bulgaria) Magdalena Maleeva (Belarus) Natasha Zvereva (Spain) Gala León García
10 Jul	Internazionali Femminili di Palermo; Palermo, Italy; Tier IV event Clay – $140,000 – 32S/32Q/16D; Singles – Doubles	(Slovakia) Henrieta Nagyová; 6–3, 7–5	(Bulgaria) Pavlina Nola	(Italy) Silvia Farina Elia (Israel) Anna Smashnova	(Argentina) Mariana Díaz Oliva (Belgium) Justine Henin (Slovakia) Janette Husárová (Italy) Gloria Pizzichini
10 Jul	Internazionali Femminili di Palermo; Palermo, Italy; Tier IV event Clay – $140,000 – 32S/32Q/16D; Singles – Doubles	(Italy) Silvia Farina Elia (Italy) Rita Grande; 6–4, 0–6, 7–6^{(8–6)}	(Romania) Ruxandra Dragomir (Spain) Virginia Ruano Pascual	(Italy) Silvia Farina Elia (Israel) Anna Smashnova	(Argentina) Mariana Díaz Oliva (Belgium) Justine Henin (Slovakia) Janette Husárová (Italy) Gloria Pizzichini
17 Jul	Idea Prokom Open; Sopot, Poland; Tier III event Clay – $170,000 – 30S/32Q/16D; Singles – Doubles	(Germany) Anke Huber; 7–6^{(7–4)}, 6–3	(Spain) Gala León García	(Argentina) Paola Suárez (Russia) Anastasia Myskina	(Spain) Conchita Martínez (Switzerland) Patty Schnyder (Austria) Barbara Schett (Czech Republic) Květa Hrdličková
17 Jul	Idea Prokom Open; Sopot, Poland; Tier III event Clay – $170,000 – 30S/32Q/16D; Singles – Doubles	(Spain) Virginia Ruano Pascual (Argentina) Paola Suárez; 7–5, 6–1	(Sweden) Åsa Carlsson (Italy) Rita Grande	(Argentina) Paola Suárez (Russia) Anastasia Myskina	(Spain) Conchita Martínez (Switzerland) Patty Schnyder (Austria) Barbara Schett (Czech Republic) Květa Hrdličková
17 Jul	Sanex Trophy; Knokke-Heist, Belgium; Tier IV event Clay – $110,000 – 32S/32Q/16D; Singles – Doubles	(Israel) Anna Smashnova; 6–2, 7–5	(Belgium) Dominique van Roost	(Spain) Magüi Serna (Spain) Marta Marrero	(Madagascar) Dally Randriantefy (Austria) Patricia Wartusch (France) Sarah Pitkowski (Belgium) Sabine Appelmans
17 Jul	Sanex Trophy; Knokke-Heist, Belgium; Tier IV event Clay – $110,000 – 32S/32Q/16D; Singles – Doubles	(Italy) Giulia Casoni (Uzbekistan) Iroda Tulyaganova; 2–6, 6–4, 6–4	(Australia) Catherine Barclay (Denmark) Eva Dyrberg	(Spain) Magüi Serna (Spain) Marta Marrero	(Madagascar) Dally Randriantefy (Austria) Patricia Wartusch (France) Sarah Pitkowski (Belgium) Sabine Appelmans
24 Jul	Bank of the West Classic; Stanford, United States; Tier II event Hard – $535,000 – 28S/32Q/16D; Singles – Doubles	(United States) Venus Williams; 6–1, 6–4	(United States) Lindsay Davenport	(United States) Monica Seles (Russia) Anna Kournikova	(United States) Chanda Rubin (Zimbabwe) Cara Black (France) Sandrine Testud (United States) Amy Frazier
24 Jul	Bank of the West Classic; Stanford, United States; Tier II event Hard – $535,000 – 28S/32Q/16D; Singles – Doubles	(United States) Chanda Rubin (France) Sandrine Testud; 6–4, 6–4	(Zimbabwe) Cara Black (United States) Amy Frazier	(United States) Monica Seles (Russia) Anna Kournikova	(United States) Chanda Rubin (Zimbabwe) Cara Black (France) Sandrine Testud (United States) Amy Frazier
31 Jul	Acura Classic; San Diego, United States; Tier II event Hard – $535,000 – 28S/32Q/16D; Singles – Doubles	(United States) Venus Williams; 6–0, 6–7^{(3–7)}, 6–3	(United States) Monica Seles	(United States) Amy Frazier (Russia) Anna Kournikova	(Switzerland) Martina Hingis (Spain) Conchita Martínez (France) Sandrine Testud (France) Nathalie Tauziat
31 Jul	Acura Classic; San Diego, United States; Tier II event Hard – $535,000 – 28S/32Q/16D; Singles – Doubles	(United States) Lisa Raymond (Australia) Rennae Stubbs; 4–6, 6–3, 7–6^{(8–6)}	(United States) Lindsay Davenport (Russia) Anna Kournikova	(United States) Amy Frazier (Russia) Anna Kournikova	(Switzerland) Martina Hingis (Spain) Conchita Martínez (France) Sandrine Testud (France) Nathalie Tauziat

=== August ===
Week	Tournament	Champions	Runners-up	Semifinalists	Quarterfinalists
7 Aug	estyle.com Classic; Manhattan Beach, United States; Tier II event Hard – $535,000 – 32S/32Q/16D; Singles – Doubles	(United States) Serena Williams; 4–6, 6–4, 7–6^{(7–1)}	(United States) Lindsay Davenport	(Switzerland) Martina Hingis (Russia) Elena Dementieva	(United States) Amy Frazier (Spain) Conchita Martínez (United States) Lisa Raymond (France) Sandrine Testud
7 Aug	estyle.com Classic; Manhattan Beach, United States; Tier II event Hard – $535,000 – 32S/32Q/16D; Singles – Doubles	(Belgium) Els Callens (Belgium) Dominique van Roost; 6–2, 7–5	(United States) Kimberly Po (France) Anne-Gaëlle Sidot	(Switzerland) Martina Hingis (Russia) Elena Dementieva	(United States) Amy Frazier (Spain) Conchita Martínez (United States) Lisa Raymond (France) Sandrine Testud
14 Aug	du Maurier Open; Montreal, Canada; Tier I event Hard – $1,080,000 – 56S/32Q/28D; Singles – Doubles	(Switzerland) Martina Hingis; 0–6, 6–3, 3–0 retired.	(United States) Serena Williams	(Spain) Conchita Martínez (Spain) Arantxa Sánchez Vicario	(France) Sandrine Testud (Luxembourg) Anne Kremer (United States) Amy Frazier (Bulgaria) Magdalena Maleeva
14 Aug	du Maurier Open; Montreal, Canada; Tier I event Hard – $1,080,000 – 56S/32Q/28D; Singles – Doubles	(Switzerland) Martina Hingis (France) Nathalie Tauziat; 6–3, 3–6, 6–4	(France) Julie Halard-Decugis (Japan) Ai Sugiyama	(Spain) Conchita Martínez (Spain) Arantxa Sánchez Vicario	(France) Sandrine Testud (Luxembourg) Anne Kremer (United States) Amy Frazier (Bulgaria) Magdalena Maleeva
21 Aug	Pilot Pen Tennis; New Haven, United States; Tier II event Hard – $535,000 – 28S/32Q/16D; Singles – Doubles	(United States) Venus Williams; 6–2, 6–4	(United States) Monica Seles	(South Africa) Amanda Coetzer (France) Nathalie Tauziat	(Switzerland) Patty Schnyder (Germany) Anke Huber (Belgium) Kim Clijsters (Belgium) Dominique van Roost
21 Aug	Pilot Pen Tennis; New Haven, United States; Tier II event Hard – $535,000 – 28S/32Q/16D; Singles – Doubles	(France) Julie Halard-Decugis (Japan) Ai Sugiyama; 6–4, 5–7, 6–2	(Spain) Virginia Ruano Pascual (Argentina) Paola Suárez	(South Africa) Amanda Coetzer (France) Nathalie Tauziat	(Switzerland) Patty Schnyder (Germany) Anke Huber (Belgium) Kim Clijsters (Belgium) Dominique van Roost
28 Aug; 4 Sep	US Open; New York City, United States; Grand Slam; Hard – $6,467,000 – 128S/96Q/64D/32X; Singles – Doubles – Mixed doubles	(United States) Venus Williams; 6–4, 7–5	(United States) Lindsay Davenport	(Switzerland) Martina Hingis (Russia) Elena Dementieva	(United States) Monica Seles (France) Nathalie Tauziat (Germany) Anke Huber (United States) Serena Williams
28 Aug; 4 Sep	US Open; New York City, United States; Grand Slam; Hard – $6,467,000 – 128S/96Q/64D/32X; Singles – Doubles – Mixed doubles	(France) Julie Halard-Decugis (Japan) Ai Sugiyama; 6–0, 1–6, 6–1	(Zimbabwe) Cara Black (Russia) Elena Likhovtseva	(Switzerland) Martina Hingis (Russia) Elena Dementieva	(United States) Monica Seles (France) Nathalie Tauziat (Germany) Anke Huber (United States) Serena Williams
28 Aug; 4 Sep	US Open; New York City, United States; Grand Slam; Hard – $6,467,000 – 128S/96Q/64D/32X; Singles – Doubles – Mixed doubles	(United States) Jared Palmer (Spain) Arantxa Sánchez Vicario; 6–4, 6–3	(Belarus) Max Mirnyi (Russia) Anna Kournikova	(Switzerland) Martina Hingis (Russia) Elena Dementieva	(United States) Monica Seles (France) Nathalie Tauziat (Germany) Anke Huber (United States) Serena Williams

=== September ===
Week	Tournament	Champions	Runners-up	Semifinalists		Quarterfinalists
18 Sep	Sydney Olympics; Sydney, Australia $0 – hard – 64S/31D; Singles – Doubles	Gold	Silver	Bronze	Fourth place	(South Africa) Amanda Coetzer (Austria) Barbara Schett (Belgium) Dominique van Roost (Spain) Arantxa Sánchez Vicario
18 Sep	Sydney Olympics; Sydney, Australia $0 – hard – 64S/31D; Singles – Doubles	(United States) Venus Williams; 6–2, 6–4	(Russia) Elena Dementieva	(United States) Monica Seles; 6–1, 6–4	(Australia) Jelena Dokić	(South Africa) Amanda Coetzer (Austria) Barbara Schett (Belgium) Dominique van Roost (Spain) Arantxa Sánchez Vicario
18 Sep	Sydney Olympics; Sydney, Australia $0 – hard – 64S/31D; Singles – Doubles	(United States) Serena Williams (United States) Venus Williams; 6–1, 6–1	(Netherlands) Kristie Boogert (Netherlands) Miriam Oremans	(Belgium) Els Callens (Belgium) Dominique van Roost; 4–6, 6–4, 6–1	(Belarus) Olga Barabanschikova (Belarus) Natalia Zvereva	(South Africa) Amanda Coetzer (Austria) Barbara Schett (Belgium) Dominique van Roost (Spain) Arantxa Sánchez Vicario
25 Sep	SEAT Open; Kockelscheuer, Luxembourg; Tier III event Hard (i) – $170,000 – 30S/32Q/16D; Singles – Doubles	(United States) Jennifer Capriati; 4–6, 6–1, 6–4	(Bulgaria) Magdalena Maleeva	(Germany) Barbara Rittner (Russia) Anna Kournikova		(Slovakia) Daniela Hantuchová (France) Anne-Gaëlle Sidot (Switzerland) Patty Schnyder (Belgium) Kim Clijsters
25 Sep	SEAT Open; Kockelscheuer, Luxembourg; Tier III event Hard (i) – $170,000 – 30S/32Q/16D; Singles – Doubles	(France) Alexandra Fusai (France) Nathalie Tauziat; 6–3, 7–6(0)	(Bulgaria) Lubomira Bacheva (Spain) Cristina Torrens Valero	(Germany) Barbara Rittner (Russia) Anna Kournikova		(Slovakia) Daniela Hantuchová (France) Anne-Gaëlle Sidot (Switzerland) Patty Schnyder (Belgium) Kim Clijsters

=== October ===
Week	Tournament	Champions	Runners-up	Semifinalists	Quarterfinalists
2 Oct	Toyota Princess Cup; Tokyo, Japan; Tier II event Hard – $535,000 – 28S/32Q/16D; Singles – Doubles	(United States) Serena Williams; 7–5, 6–1	(France) Julie Halard-Decugis	(United States) Monica Seles (Czech Republic) Dája Bedáňová	(Japan) Shinobu Asagoe (United States) Kristina Brandi (United States) Amy Frazier (Australia) Jelena Dokić
2 Oct	Toyota Princess Cup; Tokyo, Japan; Tier II event Hard – $535,000 – 28S/32Q/16D; Singles – Doubles	(France) Julie Halard-Decugis (Japan) Ai Sugiyama; 6–0, 6–2	(Japan) Nana Miyagi (Argentina) Paola Suárez	(United States) Monica Seles (Czech Republic) Dája Bedáňová	(Japan) Shinobu Asagoe (United States) Kristina Brandi (United States) Amy Frazier (Australia) Jelena Dokić
2 Oct	Porsche Grand Prix; Filderstadt, Germany; Tier II event Hard (i) – $535,000 – 28S/32Q/16D; Singles – Doubles	(Switzerland) Martina Hingis; 6–0, 6–3	(Belgium) Kim Clijsters	(Spain) Arantxa Sánchez Vicario (France) Nathalie Tauziat	(Belgium) Dominique van Roost (South Africa) Amanda Coetzer (France) Anne-Gaëlle Sidot (Spain) Conchita Martínez
2 Oct	Porsche Grand Prix; Filderstadt, Germany; Tier II event Hard (i) – $535,000 – 28S/32Q/16D; Singles – Doubles	(Switzerland) Martina Hingis (Russia) Anna Kournikova; 6–4, 6–2	(Spain) Arantxa Sánchez Vicario (Austria) Barbara Schett	(Spain) Arantxa Sánchez Vicario (France) Nathalie Tauziat	(Belgium) Dominique van Roost (South Africa) Amanda Coetzer (France) Anne-Gaëlle Sidot (Spain) Conchita Martínez
9 Oct	Swisscom Challenge; Zürich, Switzerland; Tier I event Carpet (i) – $1,080,000 – 28S/32Q/16D; Singles – Doubles	(Switzerland) Martina Hingis; 6–4, 4–6, 7–5	(United States) Lindsay Davenport	(United States) Jennifer Capriati (Austria) Barbara Schett	(Russia) Anastasia Myskina (Russia) Anna Kournikova (France) Nathalie Tauziat (United States) Chanda Rubin
9 Oct	Swisscom Challenge; Zürich, Switzerland; Tier I event Carpet (i) – $1,080,000 – 28S/32Q/16D; Singles – Doubles	(Switzerland) Martina Hingis (Russia) Anna Kournikova; 6–3, 6–4	(United States) Kimberly Po (France) Anne-Gaëlle Sidot	(United States) Jennifer Capriati (Austria) Barbara Schett	(Russia) Anastasia Myskina (Russia) Anna Kournikova (France) Nathalie Tauziat (United States) Chanda Rubin
9 Oct	Japan Open; Tokyo, Japan; Tier III event Hard – $170,000 – 30S/32Q/16D	(France) Julie Halard-Decugis; 5–7, 7–5, 6–4	(United States) Amy Frazier	(Thailand) Tamarine Tanasugarn (South Africa) Joannette Kruger	(Switzerland) Miroslava Vavrinec (United States) Tara Snyder (Chinese Taipei) Janet Lee (Austria) Sylvia Plischke
9 Oct	Japan Open; Tokyo, Japan; Tier III event Hard – $170,000 – 30S/32Q/16D	(France) Julie Halard-Decugis (United States) Corina Morariu; 6–1, 6–2	(Slovenia) Tina Križan (Slovenia) Katarina Srebotnik	(Thailand) Tamarine Tanasugarn (South Africa) Joannette Kruger	(Switzerland) Miroslava Vavrinec (United States) Tara Snyder (Chinese Taipei) Janet Lee (Austria) Sylvia Plischke
16 Oct	Generali Open; Linz, Austria; Tier II event Hard (i) – $535,000 – 28S/32Q/16D; Singles – Doubles	(United States) Lindsay Davenport; 6–4, 3–6, 6–2	(United States) Venus Williams	(Czech Republic) Květa Hrdličková (United States) Chanda Rubin	(Austria) Barbara Schett (France) Nathalie Tauziat (Slovakia) Henrieta Nagyová (Russia) Elena Likhovtseva
16 Oct	Generali Open; Linz, Austria; Tier II event Hard (i) – $535,000 – 28S/32Q/16D; Singles – Doubles	(France) Amélie Mauresmo (United States) Chanda Rubin; 6–4, 6–4	(Japan) Ai Sugiyama (France) Nathalie Tauziat	(Czech Republic) Květa Hrdličková (United States) Chanda Rubin	(Austria) Barbara Schett (France) Nathalie Tauziat (Slovakia) Henrieta Nagyová (Russia) Elena Likhovtseva
16 Oct	Heineken Open; Shanghai, China; Tier IV event Hard – $140,000 – 32S/26Q/16D	(United States) Meghann Shaughnessy; 7–6^{(7–2)}, 7–5	(Uzbekistan) Iroda Tulyaganova	(Bulgaria) Pavlina Nola (Thailand) Tamarine Tanasugarn	(United States) Kristina Brandi (Japan) Saori Obata (Israel) Anna Smashnova (Australia) Jelena Dokić
16 Oct	Heineken Open; Shanghai, China; Tier IV event Hard – $140,000 – 32S/26Q/16D	(United States) Lilia Osterloh (Thailand) Tamarine Tanasugarn; 7–5, 6–1	(Italy) Rita Grande (United States) Meghann Shaughnessy	(Bulgaria) Pavlina Nola (Thailand) Tamarine Tanasugarn	(United States) Kristina Brandi (Japan) Saori Obata (Israel) Anna Smashnova (Australia) Jelena Dokić
23 Oct	Kremlin Cup; Moscow, Russia; Tier I event Carpet (i) – $1,080,000 – 28S/32Q/16D; Singles – Doubles	(Switzerland) Martina Hingis; 6–3, 6–1	(Russia) Anna Kournikova	(France) Amélie Mauresmo (France) Nathalie Tauziat	(Russia) Elena Dementieva (Bulgaria) Magdalena Maleeva (Russia) Tatiana Panova (Austria) Barbara Schett
23 Oct	Kremlin Cup; Moscow, Russia; Tier I event Carpet (i) – $1,080,000 – 28S/32Q/16D; Singles – Doubles	(France) Julie Halard-Decugis (Japan) Ai Sugiyama; 4–6, 6–4, 7–6^{(7–5)}	(Switzerland) Martina Hingis (Russia) Anna Kournikova	(France) Amélie Mauresmo (France) Nathalie Tauziat	(Russia) Elena Dementieva (Bulgaria) Magdalena Maleeva (Russia) Tatiana Panova (Austria) Barbara Schett
23 Oct	EuroTel Slovak Indoor; Bratislava, Slovakia; Tier IV event Hard (i) – $110,000 – 32S/32Q/16D; Singles – Doubles	(Czech Republic) Dája Bedáňová; 6–1, 5–7, 6–3	(Netherlands) Miriam Oremans	(Czech Republic) Denisa Chládková (Slovakia) Karina Habšudová	(France) Anne-Gaëlle Sidot (Austria) Sylvia Plischke (Belgium) Justine Henin (Slovakia) Henrieta Nagyová
23 Oct	EuroTel Slovak Indoor; Bratislava, Slovakia; Tier IV event Hard (i) – $110,000 – 32S/32Q/16D; Singles – Doubles	(Slovakia) Karina Habšudová (Slovakia) Daniela Hantuchová; Walkover	(Hungary) Petra Mandula (Austria) Patricia Wartusch	(Czech Republic) Denisa Chládková (Slovakia) Karina Habšudová	(France) Anne-Gaëlle Sidot (Austria) Sylvia Plischke (Belgium) Justine Henin (Slovakia) Henrieta Nagyová
30 Oct	Sparkassen Cup; Leipzig, Germany; Tier II event Hard (i) – $535,000 – 28S/32Q/16D; Singles – Doubles	(Belgium) Kim Clijsters; 7–6^{(8–6)}, 4–6, 6–4	(Russia) Elena Likhovtseva	(France) Nathalie Tauziat (Russia) Anna Kournikova	(Austria) Barbara Schett (Russia) Elena Dementieva (Bulgaria) Magdalena Maleeva (Australia) Jelena Dokić
30 Oct	Sparkassen Cup; Leipzig, Germany; Tier II event Hard (i) – $535,000 – 28S/32Q/16D; Singles – Doubles	(Spain) Arantxa Sánchez Vicario (France) Anne-Gaëlle Sidot; 6–7^{(6–8)}, 7–5, 6–3	(Belgium) Kim Clijsters (Belgium) Laurence Courtois	(France) Nathalie Tauziat (Russia) Anna Kournikova	(Austria) Barbara Schett (Russia) Elena Dementieva (Bulgaria) Magdalena Maleeva (Australia) Jelena Dokić
30 Oct	Bell Challenge; Quebec City, Canada; Tier III event Carpet (i) – $170,000 – 30S/32Q/16D; Singles – Doubles	(United States) Chanda Rubin; 6–4, 6–2	(United States) Jennifer Capriati	(United States) Amy Frazier (United States) Meilen Tu	(Canada) Sonya Jeyaseelan (Venezuela) María Vento (Belarus) Tatiana Poutchek (Colombia) Fabiola Zuluaga
30 Oct	Bell Challenge; Quebec City, Canada; Tier III event Carpet (i) – $170,000 – 30S/32Q/16D; Singles – Doubles	(Australia) Nicole Pratt (United States) Meghann Shaughnessy; 6–3, 6–4	(Belgium) Els Callens (United States) Kimberly Po	(United States) Amy Frazier (United States) Meilen Tu	(Canada) Sonya Jeyaseelan (Venezuela) María Vento (Belarus) Tatiana Poutchek (Colombia) Fabiola Zuluaga

=== November ===
Week	Tournament	Champions	Runners-up	Semifinalists	Quarterfinalists
6 Nov	Advanta Championships; Philadelphia, United States; Tier II event Hard – $535,000 – 28S/32Q/16D; Singles – Doubles	(United States) Lindsay Davenport; 7–6^{(9–7)}, 6–4	(Switzerland) Martina Hingis	(France) Nathalie Tauziat (Spain) Conchita Martínez	(Russia) Anna Kournikova (France) Julie Halard-Decugis (United States) Holly Parkinson (South Africa) Amanda Coetzer
6 Nov	Advanta Championships; Philadelphia, United States; Tier II event Hard – $535,000 – 28S/32Q/16D; Singles – Doubles	(Switzerland) Martina Hingis (Russia) Anna Kournikova; 6–2, 7–5	(United States) Lisa Raymond (Australia) Rennae Stubbs	(France) Nathalie Tauziat (Spain) Conchita Martínez	(Russia) Anna Kournikova (France) Julie Halard-Decugis (United States) Holly Parkinson (South Africa) Amanda Coetzer
6 Nov	Wismilak International; Kuala Lumpur, Malaysia; Tier III event Hard – $170,000 – 30S/31Q/16D; Singles – Doubles	(Slovakia) Henrieta Nagyová; 6–4, 6–2	(Croatia) Iva Majoli	(Thailand) Tamarine Tanasugarn (Russia) Tatiana Panova	(United States) Corina Morariu (South Africa) Joannette Kruger (Slovakia) Martina Suchá (Bulgaria) Pavlina Nola
6 Nov	Wismilak International; Kuala Lumpur, Malaysia; Tier III event Hard – $170,000 – 30S/31Q/16D; Singles – Doubles	(Slovakia) Henrieta Nagyová (Austria) Sylvia Plischke; 6–4, 7–6^{(7–4)}	(South Africa) Liezel Horn (Canada) Vanessa Webb	(Thailand) Tamarine Tanasugarn (Russia) Tatiana Panova	(United States) Corina Morariu (South Africa) Joannette Kruger (Slovakia) Martina Suchá (Bulgaria) Pavlina Nola
13 Nov	Chase Championships; New York City, United States; Year-end Championship; Carpet (i) – $2,000,000 – 16S/8D; Singles – Doubles	(Switzerland) Martina Hingis; 6–7^{(5–7)}, 6–4, 6–4	(United States) Monica Seles	(Russia) Anna Kournikova (Russia) Elena Dementieva	(France) Nathalie Tauziat (Spain) Conchita Martínez (South Africa) Amanda Coetzer (Belgium) Kim Clijsters
13 Nov	Chase Championships; New York City, United States; Year-end Championship; Carpet (i) – $2,000,000 – 16S/8D; Singles – Doubles	(Switzerland) Martina Hingis (Russia) Anna Kournikova; 6–2, 6–3	(United States) Nicole Arendt (Netherlands) Manon Bollegraf	(Russia) Anna Kournikova (Russia) Elena Dementieva	(France) Nathalie Tauziat (Spain) Conchita Martínez (South Africa) Amanda Coetzer (Belgium) Kim Clijsters
13 Nov	Volvo Women's Open; Pattaya, Thailand; Tier IV event Hard – $110,000 – 32S/32Q/16D; Singles – Doubles	(Luxembourg) Anne Kremer; 6–1, 6–4	(Russia) Tatiana Panova	(Slovakia) Henrieta Nagyová (Belarus) Nadejda Ostrovskaya	(Italy) Silvia Farina Elia (Canada) Vanessa Webb (South Africa) Joannette Kruger (Thailand) Tamarine Tanasugarn
13 Nov	Volvo Women's Open; Pattaya, Thailand; Tier IV event Hard – $110,000 – 32S/32Q/16D; Singles – Doubles	(Indonesia) Yayuk Basuki (Netherlands) Caroline Vis; 6–3, 6–3	(Slovenia) Tina Križan (Slovenia) Katarina Srebotnik	(Slovakia) Henrieta Nagyová (Belarus) Nadejda Ostrovskaya	(Italy) Silvia Farina Elia (Canada) Vanessa Webb (South Africa) Joannette Kruger (Thailand) Tamarine Tanasugarn
20 Nov	Fed Cup: Final; Bari, Italy – clay	United States; 5–0	Spain	Belgium 1–2; Czech Republic 1–2	

== Rankings ==
Below are the 2000 WTA year-end rankings:

No	Player Name	Nation	Points	1999	Change
1	Martina Hingis	SUI	6,044	1	=
2	Lindsay Davenport	USA	5,021	2	=
3	Venus Williams	USA	3,694	3	=
4	Monica Seles	USA	3,255	6	+2
5	Conchita Martínez	ESP	2,752	15	+10
6	Serena Williams	USA	2,306	4	-2
7	Mary Pierce	FRA	2,162	5	-2
8	Arantxa Sánchez Vicario	ESP	2,131	17	+9
9	Anna Kournikova	RUS	2,098	12	+3
10	Nathalie Tauziat	FRA	1,918	7	-3
11	Elena Dementieva	RUS	1,773	62	+51
12	Amanda Coetzer	RSA	1,752	11	-1
13	Chanda Rubin	USA	1,722	22	+9
14	Jennifer Capriati	USA	1,663	23	+9
15	Julie Halard-Decugis	FRA	1,435	9	-6
16	Amélie Mauresmo	FRA	1,426	10	-6
17	Sandrine Testud	FRA	1,413	13	-4
18	Kim Clijsters	BEL	1,398	47	+29
19	Anke Huber	GER	1,369	16	-3
20	Amy Frazier	USA	1,254	19	-1

=== Number 1 ranking ===
Holder	Date gained	Date forfeited
Martina Hingis (SUI)	Year-end 1999	2 April 2000
Lindsay Davenport (USA)	3 April 2000	7 May 2000
Martina Hingis (SUI)	8 May 2000	14 May 2000
Lindsay Davenport (USA)	15 May 2000	21 May 2000
Martina Hingis (SUI)	22 May 2000	Year-end 2000

== Statistics ==
List of players and titles won, last name alphabetically:

- (Switzerland) Martina Hingis – Tokyo, Miami, Hamburg, 's-Hertogenbosch, Montreal, Filderstadt, Zurich, Moscow and WTA Tour Championships (9)
- (United States) Venus Williams – Wimbledon, Stanford, San Diego, New Haven, U.S. Open and Sydney Olympics (6)
- (United States) Lindsay Davenport – Australian Open, Indian Wells, Linz and Philadelphia (4)
- (Slovakia) Henrieta Nagyová – Warsaw, Palermo and Kuala Lumpur (3)
- (United States) Monica Seles – Oklahoma City, Amelia Island and Rome (3)
- (United States) Serena Williams – Hanover, Los Angeles and Tokyo Cup (3)
- (Belgium) Kim Clijsters – Hobart and Leipzig (2)
- (France) Julie Halard-Decugis – Eastbourne and Tokyo Open (2)
- (Germany) Anke Huber – Estoril and Sopot (2)
- (Luxembourg) Anne Kremer – Auckland and Pattaya City (2)
- (France) Mary Pierce – Hilton Head and French Open (2)
- (Croatia) Silvija Talaja – Gold Coast and Strasbourg (2)
- (Czech Republic) Dája Bedáňová – Bratislava (1)
- (United States) Jennifer Capriati – Luxembourg (1)
- (South Africa) Amanda Coetzer – Antwerp (1)
- (Italy) Tathiana Garbin – Budapest (1)
- (Hungary) Rita Kuti-Kis – São Paulo (1)
- (Spain) Gala León García – Madrid (1)
- (Spain) Conchita Martínez – Berlin (1)
- (France) Amélie Mauresmo – Sydney (1)
- (Slovenia) Tina Pisnik – Bol (1)
- (United States) Lisa Raymond – Birmingham (1)
- (United States) Chanda Rubin – Quebec City (1)
- (Austria) Barbara Schett – Klagenfurt (1)
- (United States) Meghann Shaughnessy – Shanghai (1)
- (Israel) Anna Smashnova – Knokke-Heist (1)
- (France) Nathalie Tauziat – Paris (1)
- (Uzbekistan) Iroda Tulyaganova – Tashkent (1)
- (Austria) Patricia Wartusch – Bogotá (1)

The following players won their first title:

- (Croatia) Silvija Talaja – Gold Coast
- (Luxembourg) Anne Kremer – Auckland
- (Austria) Patricia Wartusch – Bogotá
- (Hungary) Rita Kuti-Kis – São Paulo
- (Italy) Tathiana Garbin – Budapest
- (Croatia) Tina Pisnik – Bol
- (Spain) Gala León García – Madrid
- (Uzbekistan) Iroda Tulyaganova – Tashkent
- (United States) Meghann Shaughnessy – Shanghai
- (Czech Republic) Dája Bedáňová – Bratislava

Titles won by nation:

- United States – 20 (Australian Open, Hanover, Oklahoma City, Indian Wells, Amelia Island, Rome, Birmingham, Wimbledon, Stanford, San Diego, Los Angeles, New Haven, U.S. Open, Sydney Olympics, Luxembourg, Tokyo Cup, Linz, Shanghai, Quebec City and Philadelphia)
- Switzerland – 9 (Tokyo, Miami, Hamburg, 's-Hertogenbosch, Montreal, Filderstadt, Zurich, Moscow and WTA Tour Championships)
- France – 6 (Sydney, Paris, Hilton Head, French Open, Eastbourne and Tokyo Open)
- Slovakia – 3 (Warsaw, Palermo and Kuala Lumpur)
- Austria – 2 (Bogotá and Klagenfurt)
- Belgium – 2 (Hobart and Leipzig)
- Croatia – 2 (Gold Coast and Strasbourg)
- Germany – 2 (Estoril and Sopot)
- Luxembourg – 2 (Auckland and Pattaya City)
- Spain – 2 (Berlin and Madrid)
- Czech Republic – 1 (Bratislava)
- Hungary – 1 (São Paulo)
- Israel – 1 (Knokke-Heist)
- Italy – 1 (Budapest)
- South Africa – 1 (Antwerp)
- Slovenia – 1 (Bol)
- Uzbekistan – 1 (Tashkent)

== See also ==
- 2000 ATP Tour
- WTA Tour
- List of female tennis players
- List of tennis tournaments
