= 2000 Open de España Villa de Madrid =

- Date: 22–27 May 2000
- Edition: 5th
- Category: WTA Tier III
- Draw: 32S / 16D
- Prize money: US$ 170,000
- Surface: Clay / outdoor
- Location: Madrid, Spain
- Venue: Club de Campo Villa de Madrid

Champions

Singles
- (Spain) Gala León García

Doubles
- (United States) Lisa Raymond / (Australia) Rennae Stubbs
← 1999 ·	WTA Madrid Open	· 2001 →

The 2000 Open de España Villa de Madrid (also known as the WTA Madrid Open or Trofeo Volkswagen for sponsorship reasons) was a professional women's tennis tournament played on outdoor clay courts at the Club de Campo Villa de Madrid in Madrid, Spain from 22–27 May 2000. It was the fifth edition of the event on the WTA Tour. It was classified as a Tier III event on the 2000 WTA Tour. Eighth-seeded Gala León García won the singles title.

== Finals ==
=== Singles ===
- (Spain) Gala León García defeated (Colombia) Fabiola Zuluaga, 4–6, 6–2, 6–2

=== Doubles ===
- (United States) Lisa Raymond / (Australia) Rennae Stubbs defeated (Spain) Gala León García / (Spain) María Sánchez Lorenzo, 6–1, 6–3

== Points and prize money ==
=== Point distribution ===
Event	W	F	SF	QF	Round of 16	Round of 32	Q	Q2	Q1
Singles	140	98	63	35	18	1	?		
Doubles	140	98	63	35	1	—			

=== Prize money ===
Event	W	F	SF	QF	Round of 16	Round of 32	Q	Q2	Q1
Singles	$27,000	$13,500	$6,700	$3,700	$2,100	$1,300	?		
Doubles	$8,000	$4,450	$3,000	$1,500	$750	—			

== Singles main draw entrants ==
=== Seeds ===
Country	Player	Rank^{1}	Seed
FRA	Mary Pierce	5	1
USA	Amy Frazier	19	2
JPN	Ai Sugiyama	20	3
USA	Lisa Raymond	27	4
AUT	Sylvia Plischke	29	5
ARG	Paola Suárez	33	6
USA	Kristina Brandi	39	7
ESP	Gala León García	41	8

^{1}: Rankings are as of May 15, 2000.

=== Other entrants ===
The following players received wildcards into the main draw:

- (Croatia) Iva Majoli
- (Spain) Virginia Ruano Pascual

The following players received entry from the qualifying draw:

- (Spain) Lourdes Domínguez Lino
- (Italy) Germana Di Natale
- (Spain) Anabel Medina Garrigues
- (Spain) Gisela Riera

The following player received entry as a lucky loser:

- (United States) Samantha Reeves

=== Retirements ===
- (Italy) Germana Di Natale
- (Argentina) Paola Suárez

== Doubles main draw entrants ==
=== Seeds ===
Country	Player	Country	Player	Rank^{1}	Seed
USA	Lisa Raymond	AUS	Rennae Stubbs	7	1
SLO	Katarina Srebotnik	JPN	Ai Sugiyama	37	2
~~ESP~~	~~Virginia Ruano Pascual~~	~~ARG~~	~~Paola Suárez~~	~~46~~	~~3~~
SWE	Åsa Carlsson	USA	Kimberly Po	62	4

^{1}: Rankings are as of May 15, 2000.

=== Other entrants ===
The following pair received wildcards into the doubles main draw:

- (South Africa) Mariaan de Swardt / (United States) Martina Navratilova

The following pair received entry as alternates:

- (Spain) Ana Salas Lozano / (Spain) Elena Salvador

=== Withdrawals ===
Before the tournament

- (Spain) Paula García / (Republic of Ireland) Kelly Liggan →replaced by Ana Salas Lozano / Elena Salvador

During the tournament

- (Slovakia) Henrieta Nagyova / (Spain) Magüi Serna
- (Spain) Virginia Ruano Pascual / (Argentina) Paola Suárez
