= 2000 Open de España Villa de Madrid – Doubles =

Doubles
- 2000 Open de España Villa de Madrid

Final
- Champions: (United States) Lisa Raymond (Australia) Rennae Stubbs
- Runners-up: (Spain) Gala León García (Spain) María Sánchez Lorenzo
- Score: 6–1, 6–3

Details
- Draw: 16
- Seeds: 4

Events
Singles	Doubles
← 1999 ·	WTA Madrid Open	· 2001 →

Virginia Ruano Pascual and Paola Suárez were the defending champions, but had to withdraw before the start of the tournament.

Lisa Raymond and Rennae Stubbs won the title by defeating Gala León García and María Sánchez Lorenzo 6–1, 6–3 in the final. It was the 17th title for Raymond and the 23rd title for Stubbs, in their respective doubles careers. It was also the 3rd title for the pair in the season, after their wins in the Australian Open and Rome.

== Seeds ==
1. (United States) Lisa Raymond / (Australia) Rennae Stubbs (champions)
2. (Slovenia) Katarina Srebotnik / (Japan) Ai Sugiyama (semifinals)
3. (Spain) ~~Virginia Ruano Pascual~~ / (Argentina) ~~Paola Suárez~~ (withdrew)
4. (Sweden) Åsa Carlsson / (United States) Kimberly Po (semifinals)

== Draw ==
Key

- Q = Qualifier
- WC = Wild card
- LL = Lucky loser
- Alt = Alternate
- ITF = ITF entry
- PR = Protected ranking
- SR = Special ranking
- SE = Special exempt
- JE = Junior exempt
- JR = Junior Accelerator Programme entrant
- CO = College Accelerator Programme entrant
- NG = Next Gen Accelerator Program entrant
- w/o = Walkover
- r = Retired
- d = Defaulted

=== Draw ===
First round
1	(United States) L Raymond (Australia) R Stubbs	6	6
(Czech Republic) L Cenková (Poland) K Strączy	0	1
(Australia) A Grahame (Slovenia) T Hergold	2	3
(United States) E deLone (Australia) N Pratt	6	6
4	(Sweden) Å Carlsson (United States) K Po	4	7^{7}	6
(United States) A Frazier (United States) K Schlukebir	6	6^{0}	1
(Italy) R Grande (Slovakia) K Habšudová	w	/	o
(Slovakia) H Nagyová (Spain) M Serna
(Japan) R Hiraki (United States) M Shaughnessy	3	5
WC	(South Africa) M de Swardt (United States) M Navratilova	6	7
(Spain) G León García (Spain) M Sánchez Lorenzo	w	/	o
3	(Spain) V Ruano Pascual (Argentina) P Suárez
(United States) M Mazzotta (Colombia) F Zuluaga	6	6
(Canada) M Drake (Austria) S Plischke	4	3
Alt	(Spain) A Salas Lozano (Spain) E Salvador	1	0
2	(Slovenia) K Srebotnik (Japan) A Sugiyama	6	6

Quarterfinals
1	(United States) L Raymond (Australia) R Stubbs	6	6
(United States) E deLone (Australia) N Pratt	2	1
4	(Sweden) Å Carlsson (United States) K Po	6	6
(Italy) R Grande (Slovakia) K Habšudová	4	3
WC	(South Africa) M de Swardt (United States) M Navratilova	3	6^{5}
(Spain) G León García (Spain) M Sánchez Lorenzo	6	7^{7}
(United States) M Mazzotta (Colombia) F Zuluaga	1	0
2	(Slovenia) K Srebotnik (Japan) A Sugiyama	6	6

Semifinals
1	(United States) L Raymond (Australia) R Stubbs	7^{7}	7^{7}
4	(Sweden) Å Carlsson (United States) K Po	6^{2}	6^{3}
(Spain) G León García (Spain) M Sánchez Lorenzo	3	6	6
2	(Slovenia) K Srebotnik (Japan) A Sugiyama	6	2	3

Final
1	(United States) L Raymond (Australia) R Stubbs	6	6
(Spain) G León García (Spain) M Sánchez Lorenzo	1	3
