= 1999 WTA Madrid Open =

- Date: 17–23 May
- Edition: 4th
- Category: Tier III
- Draw: 30S / 16D
- Prize money: $180,000
- Surface: Clay / outdoor
- Location: Madrid, Spain
- Venue: Club de Tenis Chamartín

Champions

Singles
- (United States) Lindsay Davenport

Doubles
- (Spain) Virginia Ruano Pascual / (Argentina) Paola Suárez
← 1998 ·	WTA Madrid Open	· 2000 →

The 1999 WTA Madrid Open, also known by its sponsored name Open Páginas Amarillas, was a women's tennis tournament played on outdoor clay courts in Madrid, Spain that was part of Tier III of the 1999 WTA Tour. The tournament was held from 17 May through 23 May 1999. First-seeded Lindsay Davenport won the singles title.

== Finals ==
=== Singles ===
(United States) Lindsay Davenport defeated (Argentina) Paola Suárez, 6–1, 6–3

- It was Davenport's 2nd title of the year and the 45th of her career.

=== Doubles ===
(Spain) Virginia Ruano Pascual / (Argentina) Paola Suárez defeated (Argentina) María Fernanda Landa / (Germany) Marlene Weingärtner, 6–2, 0–6, 6–0

== Entrants ==
=== Seeds ===
Country	Player	Rank	Seed
USA	Lindsay Davenport	2	1
SUI	Patty Schnyder	12	2
USA	Chanda Rubin	23	4
ITA	Silvia Farina	25	5
ESP	Magüi Serna	26	6
USA	Amy Frazier	30	7
ESP	Virginia Ruano Pascual	37	8
ISR	Anna Smashnova	39	9

=== Other entrants ===
The following players received wildcards into the singles main draw:

- (Spain) Marta Marrero
- (Colombia) Carolina Rodríguez

The following players received wildcards into the doubles main draw:

- (Italy) Silvia Farina / (Spain) Magüi Serna

The following players received entry from the singles qualifying draw:

- (Australia) Nicole Pratt
- (Switzerland) Emmanuelle Gagliardi
- (Spain) Gisela Riera
- (Romania) Raluca Sandu

The following players received entry as lucky losers:

- (Spain) Rosa María Andrés Rodríguez
- (Argentina) Paola Suárez

The following players received entry from the doubles qualifying draw:

- (Croatia) Silvija Talaja / (Federal Republic of Yugoslavia) Dragana Zarić
