= 1999 WTA Madrid Open – Doubles =

Doubles
- 1999 WTA Madrid Open

Final
- Champions: (Spain) Virginia Ruano Pascual (Argentina) Paola Suárez
- Runners-up: (Argentina) María Fernanda Landa (Germany) Marlene Weingärtner
- Score: 6–2, 0–6, 6–0

Details
- Draw: 16
- Seeds: 4

Events
Singles	Doubles
← 1998 ·	WTA Madrid Open	· 2000 →

The 1999 WTA Madrid Open doubles was the doubles event of the fourth edition of the Internationaux de Strasbourg, a WTA Tier III tournament held in Madrid, Spain and part of the European clay court season. Florencia Labat and Dominique Van Roost were the reigning champions, but they did not compete this year.

Virginia Ruano Pascual and Paola Suárez won the title, defeating Marlene Weingärtner and Labat's and Suárez's compatriot María Fernanda Landa in the final, 6–2, 0–6, 6–0.

== Seeds ==
1. (United States) Kimberly Po / (Switzerland) Patty Schnyder (first round)
2. (Spain) Virginia Ruano Pascual / (Argentina) Paola Suárez (champions)
3. (United States) Debbie Graham / (Argentina) Laura Montalvo (semifinals)
4. (United States) Katrina Adams / (United States) Chanda Rubin (quarterfinals)

== Draw ==
=== Key ===
- Q = Qualifier
- WC = Wild card
- LL = Lucky loser
- Alt = Alternate
- ITF = ITF entry
- PR = Protected ranking
- SR = Special ranking
- SE = Special exempt
- JE = Junior exempt
- JR = Junior Accelerator Programme entrant
- CO = College Accelerator Programme entrant
- NG = Next Gen Accelerator Program entrant
- w/o = Walkover
- r = Retired
- d = Defaulted

First round
1	(United States) K Po (Switzerland) P Schnyder	6	5	0
(Australia) R McQuillan (Australia) N Pratt	4	7	6
(Australia) L Pleming (France) C Tanvier	6	6
(Bulgaria) S Krivencheva (United Kingdom) L Woodroffe	4	3
4	(United States) K Adams (United States) C Rubin	6	6
(Spain) G León García (Germany) C Singer	4	0
(Italy) A Canepa (Spain) A Ortuño	5	2
(Argentina) M-F Landa (Germany) M Weingärtner	7	6
(United Kingdom) H Crook (United Kingdom) V Davies	3	2
(Ukraine) O Lugina (Croatia) M Murić	6	6
(United States) A Frazier (United States) K Schlukebir	4	4
3	(United States) D Graham (Argentina) L Montalvo	6	6
WC	(Italy) S Farina (Spain) M Serna	7^{7}	6
(Australia) T Musgrave (Australia) B Stewart	6^{4}	4
Q	(Croatia) S Talaja (Federal Republic of Yugoslavia) D Zarić	3	6^{1}
2	(Spain) V Ruano Pascual (Argentina) P Suárez	6	7^{7}

Quarterfinals
(Australia) R McQuillan (Australia) N Pratt	6	6^{6}	6
(Australia) L Pleming (France) C Tanvier	3	7^{8}	4
4	(United States) K Adams (United States) C Rubin	6	5	6
(Argentina) M-F Landa (Germany) M Weingärtner	4	7	4
(Ukraine) O Lugina (Croatia) M Murić	6	3	2
3	(United States) D Graham (Argentina) L Montalvo	4	6	6
WC	(Italy) S Farina (Spain) M Serna	2	3
2	(Spain) V Ruano Pascual (Argentina) P Suárez	6	6

Semifinals
(Australia) R McQuillan (Australia) N Pratt	6^{5}	5
(Argentina) M-F Landa (Germany) M Weingärtner	7^{7}	7
3	(United States) D Graham (Argentina) L Montalvo	4	3
2	(Spain) V Ruano Pascual (Argentina) P Suárez	6	6

Final
(Argentina) M-F Landa (Germany) M Weingärtner	2	6	0
2	(Spain) V Ruano Pascual (Argentina) P Suárez	6	0	6

== Qualifying ==
=== Seeds ===
1. (Switzerland) Emmanuelle Gagliardi / (Italy) Adriana Serra Zanetti (second round)
2. (Japan) Keiko Ishida / (Japan) Keiko Nagatomi (second round)

=== Qualifiers ===
1. (Croatia) Silvija Talaja / (Federal Republic of Yugoslavia) Dragana Zarić

== Qualifying draw ==
=== Key ===
- Q = Qualifier
- WC = Wild card
- LL = Lucky loser
- Alt = Alternate
- ITF = ITF entry
- PR = Protected ranking
- SR = Special ranking
- SE = Special exempt
- JE = Junior exempt
- JR = Junior Accelerator Programme entrant
- CO = College Accelerator Programme entrant
- NG = Next Gen Accelerator Program entrant
- w/o = Walkover
- r = Retired
- d = Defaulted

First round
1	(Switzerland) Emmanuelle Gagliardi (Italy) Adriana Serra Zanetti
Bye
(United States) Brie Rippner (United States) Tara Snyder	2
(Czech Republic) Ludmila Richterová (United States) Meghann Shaughnessy	8
WC	(Spain) Marta Marrero (Spain) Anabel Medina Garrigues	4
(Croatia) Silvija Talaja (Federal Republic of Yugoslavia) Dragana Zarić	8
Bye
2	(Japan) Keiko Ishida (Japan) Keiko Nagatomi

Second round
1	(Switzerland) Emmanuelle Gagliardi (Italy) Adriana Serra Zanetti	5
(Czech Republic) Ludmila Richterová (United States) Meghann Shaughnessy	8
(Croatia) Silvija Talaja (Federal Republic of Yugoslavia) Dragana Zarić	8
2	(Japan) Keiko Ishida (Japan) Keiko Nagatomi	5

Qualifying competition
(Czech Republic) Ludmila Richterová (United States) Meghann Shaughnessy	2
(Croatia) Silvija Talaja (Federal Republic of Yugoslavia) Dragana Zarić	8
