= 2000 Uniqa Grand Prix =

- Date: 10–16 July
- Edition: 30th
- Category: Tier III Series
- Draw: 32S / 16D
- Prize money: $170,000
- Surface: Clay / outdoor
- Location: Klagenfurt, Austria
- Venue: Tenniscentrum Sportunion

Champions

Singles
- (Austria) Barbara Schett

Doubles
- (Argentina) Laura Montalvo / (Argentina) Paola Suárez
- WTA Austrian Open

The 2000 Uniqa Grand Prix was a women's tennis tournament played on outdoor clay courts that was part of the Tier IV Series of the 2000 WTA Tour. It was the 30th edition of the Austrian Open and took place at the Tenniscentrum Sportunion in Klagenfurt, Austria, from 10 July until 16 July 2000. First-seeded Barbara Schett won the singles title.

== Finals ==
=== Singles ===
(Austria) Barbara Schett defeated (Switzerland) Patty Schnyder, 5–7, 6–4, 6–4

- It was Schett's only singles title of the year and the 3rd and last of her career.

=== Doubles ===
(Argentina) Laura Montalvo / (Argentina) Paola Suárez defeated (Austria) Barbara Schett / (Switzerland) Patty Schnyder, 7–6^{(7–5)}, 6–1
