= Ángeles Montolio =

Spanish tennis player (born 1975)

- Country (sports): Spain
- Born: 6 August 1975 (age 50) Barcelona
- Height: 1.57 m (5 ft 2 in)
- Turned pro: February 1990
- Retired: 2003
- Plays: Right (two-handed backhand)
- Prize money: $720,661

Singles
- Career record: 276–200
- Career titles: 3 WTA, 12 ITF
- Highest ranking: No. 22 (25 February 2002)

Grand Slam singles results
- Australian Open: 2R (2000)
- French Open: 2R (2000, 2001)
- Wimbledon: 3R (2001)
- US Open: 3R (1999, 2001)

Doubles
- Career record: 46–54
- Career titles: 0 WTA, 1 ITF
- Highest ranking: No. 114 (21 April 1997)

Grand Slam doubles results
- Australian Open: 2R (1997)

Team competitions
- Fed Cup: 2–1

Ángeles Montolio (born 6 August 1975) is a former tennis player from Spain.

Montolio reached a career-high ranking of world No. 22 in February 2002, and won three WTA Tour titles at the 2001 Estoril Open, 2001 Croatian Bol Ladies Open and 2002 Porto Open, as well as reaching the finals of the 1999 Palermo Open and Madrid Open. Her best results in Grand Slam tournaments were appearances in the third round of the Wimbledon Championships in 2001, and of the US Open in 1999 and 2001.

As a junior, she won the 1993 Orange Bowl for over-18s.

== WTA career finals ==
=== Singles: 5 (3 titles, 2 runner-ups) ===
Winner – Legend
Tier I
Tier II
Tier III (1–1)
Tier IV & V (2–1)

Result	W–L	Date	Tournament	Surface	Opponent	Score
Loss	0–1	Jul 1999	Palermo, Italy	Clay	(Russia) Anastasia Myskina	6–3, 6–7^{(3–7)}, 2–6
Win	1–1	Apr 2001	Estoril, Portugal	Clay	(Russia) Elena Bovina	3–6, 6–3, 6–2
Win	2–1	May 2001	Bol, Croatia	Clay	(Argentina) Mariana Díaz Oliva	3–6, 6–2, 6–4
Loss	2–2	May 2001	Madrid, Spain	Clay	(Spain) Arantxa Sánchez Vicario	5–7, 0–6
Win	3–2	Apr 2002	Porto, Portugal	Clay	(Spain) Magüi Serna	6–1, 2–6, 7–5

== ITF Circuit finals ==
$75,000 tournaments
$50,000 tournaments
$25,000 tournaments
$10,000 tournaments

=== Singles (12–6) ===
Result	No.	Date	Tournament	Surface	Opponent	Score
Loss	1.	2 May 1993	Lerida, Spain	Clay	(Spain) Rosa Maria Llaneras	6–7^{(3)}, 6–3, 1–6
Loss	2.	9 May 1993	Balaguer, Spain	Clay	(France) Caroline Toyre	7–6^{(5)}, 6–7^{(5)}, 4–6
Win	1.	10 May 1993	Barcelona, Spain	Clay	(Spain) Mariam Ramón Climent	7–6^{(3)}, 6–4
Loss	3.	17 May 1993	Tortosa, Spain	Clay	(Spain) María Sánchez Lorenzo	2–6, 5–7
Win	2.	21 February 1994	Valencia, Spain	Clay	(Portugal) Sofia Prazeres	6–3, 6–0
Loss	4.	28 February 1994	Madrid, Spain	Clay	(France) Sarah Pitkowski-Malcor	4–6, 3–6
Win	3.	5 June 1994	Hebron, Spain	Hard	(Spain) Cristina Torrens Valero	6–3, 6–2
Win	4.	12 June 1995	Hebron, Spain	Clay	(Italy) Federica Fortuni	7–6^{(5)}, 6–7^{(3)}, 6–4
Win	5.	13 July 1998	Getxo, Spain	Clay	(Hungary) Kira Nagy	7–6^{(4)}, 7–6^{(5)}
Win	6.	5 October 1998	Girona, Spain	Clay	(Spain) Marta Marrero	6–4, 6–1
Win	7.	1 February 1999	Mallorca, Spain	Clay	(Spain) Gisela Riera	6–0, 6–3
Win	8.	14 February 1999	Mallorca, Spain	Clay	(France) Emmanuelle Curutchet	6–3, 6–7^{(7)}, 6–1
Loss	5.	29 March 1999	Pontevedra, Spain	Hard	(Spain) Anabel Medina Garrigues	1–6, 2–6
Win	9.	9 May 1999	Athens, Greece	Clay	(Spain) Laura Pena	6–0, 6–2
Win	10.	16 May 1999	Edinburgh, UK	Clay	(Austria) Patricia Wartusch	6–3, 6–4
Win	11.	20 June 1999	Marseille, France	Clay	(Spain) Cristina Torrens Valero	6–4, 7–5
Loss	6.	27 June 1999	Gorizia, Italy	Clay	(Russia) Anastasia Myskina	1–6, 3–6
Win	12.	12 June 2000	Marseille, France	Clay	(Spain) Anabel Medina Garrigues	6–2, 6–7^{(4)}, 6–4

=== Doubles (1–3) ===
Result	No.	Date	Tournament	Surface	Partner	Opponents	Score
Loss	1.	3 May 1993	Balaguer, Spain	Clay	(Spain) Yolanda Clemot	(Australia) Melissa Beadman (Brazil) Vanessa Menga	2–6, 2–6
Loss	2.	20 February 1995	Valencia, Spain	Clay	(Spain) Estefanía Bottini	(Czech Republic) Petra Raclavská (Czech Republic) Kateřina Šišková	6–4, 3–6, 5–7
Loss	3.	10 June 1996	Budapest, Hungary	Clay	(Colombia) Fabiola Zuluaga	(Hungary) Virág Csurgó (Hungary) Nóra Köves	7–5, 5–7, 2–6
Win	1.	14 February 1999	Mallorca, Spain	Clay	(Argentina) María Fernanda Landa	(France) Emmanuelle Curutchet (Republic of Ireland) Kelly Liggan	2–6, 6–4, 7–6

== Grand Slam singles performance timeline ==
Key
W	F	SF	QF	#R	RR	Q#	DNQ	A	NH

(W) winner; (F) finalist; (SF) semifinalist; (QF) quarterfinalist; (#R) rounds 4, 3, 2, 1; (RR) round-robin stage; (Q#) qualification round; (DNQ) did not qualify; (A) absent; (NH) not held; (SR) strike rate (events won / competed); (W–L) win–loss record.

Tournament	1994	1995	1996	1997	1998	1999	2000	2001	2002	2003	W–L
Australian Open	A	1R	A	1R	A	A	2R	1R	1R	Q1	1–5
French Open	1R	Q1	1R	1R	A	Q2	2R	2R	1R	A	2–6
Wimbledon	A	A	1R	A	A	A	1R	3R	1R	A	2–4
US Open	1R	Q1	1R	A	A	3R	1R	3R	1R	A	4–6
Win–loss	0–2	0–1	0–3	0–2	0–0	2–1	2–4	5–4	0–4	0–0	9–21

Sporting positions
Preceded by (Slovenia) Barbara Mulej	Orange Bowl Girls' Singles Champion; Category: 18 and under 1993	Succeeded by (Spain) Mariam Ramón
