= 2001 Open de España Villa de Madrid =

- Date: 22–27 May 2001
- Edition: 6th
- Category: WTA Tier III
- Draw: 32S / 16D
- Prize money: $ 170,000
- Surface: Clay / outdoor
- Location: Madrid, Spain
- Venue: Club de Campo Villa de Madrid

Champions

Singles
- (Spain) Arantxa Sánchez Vicario

Doubles
- (Spain) Virginia Ruano Pascual / (Argentina) Paola Suárez
- WTA Madrid Open

The 2001 Open de España Villa de Madrid, also known as the WTA Madrid Open, was a professional women's tennis tournament played on outdoor clay courts at the Club de Campo Villa de Madrid in Madrid, Spain from 21 May until 26 May 2001. It was the sixth edition of the tournament and was classified as a Tier III event on the 2001 WTA Tour. Second-seeded Arantxa Sánchez Vicario won the singles title and earned $27,000 first-prize money.

== Finals ==
=== Singles ===
(Spain) Arantxa Sánchez Vicario defeated (Spain) Ángeles Montolio, 7–5, 6–0

- It was Sánchez Vicario' s second and last singles title of the year and the 29th and last of her career.

=== Doubles ===
(Spain) Virginia Ruano Pascual / (Argentina) Paola Suárez defeated (United States) Lisa Raymond / (Australia) Rennae Stubbs, 7–5, 2–6, 7–6^{(7–4)}

== Prize money ==
Event	W	F	SF	QF	Round of 16	Round of 32	Q	Q2	Q1
Singles	$27,000	$14,500	$7,500	$4,000	$2,200	$1,300	?		
Doubles	$8,000	$4,250	$2,250	$1,225	$650	—N/a			
