= Rita Grande =

Italian tennis player

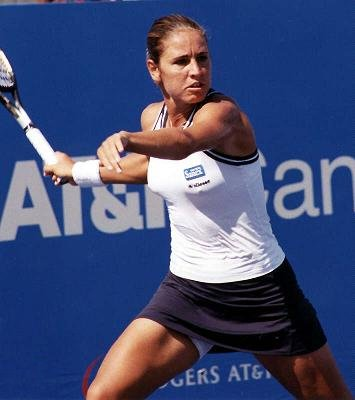
- Country (sports): Italy
- Residence: Rivoli
- Born: 23 March 1975 (age 51) Naples
- Height: 1.77 m (5 ft 10 in)
- Turned pro: 1990
- Retired: 2005
- Plays: Right-handed (two-handed backhand)
- Prize money: US$ 1,858,558

Singles
- Career record: 336–332
- Career titles: 3 WTA, 1 ITF
- Highest ranking: No. 24 (5 November 2001)

Grand Slam singles results
- Australian Open: 4R (2001, 2002)
- French Open: 4R (2001)
- Wimbledon: 4R (2004)
- US Open: 4R (1996)

Doubles
- Career record: 198–239
- Career titles: 5 WTA, 3 ITF
- Highest ranking: No. 26 (28 May 2001)

Grand Slam doubles results
- Australian Open: QF (2001)
- French Open: QF (1999, 2002)
- Wimbledon: 3R (1997, 1998)
- US Open: 3R (1996, 2004)

Rita Grande (born 23 March 1975) is a former tennis player from Italy.

During her career, Grande won three singles titles and five doubles titles on the WTA Tour. She also won one singles title and three doubles titles on the ITF Women's Circuit. On 5 November 2001, she reached her best singles ranking of world No. 24. On 28 May 2001, she peaked at No. 26 in the doubles rankings.

She played the round of 16 in singles at least once in each of the Grand Slam championships, including twice consecutively at the Australian Open, in 2001 and 2002.

Following a bad elbow injury that kept her away from competition for about ten months, Rita Grande retired from professional sport in October 2005.

== WTA career finals ==
Legend
Grand Slam tournaments
Tier I
Tier II
Tier III
Tier IV & V (3–1)

=== Singles: 4 (3 titles, 1 runner-up) ===
Result	No.	Date	Tournament	Surface	Opponent	Score
Loss	1.	Jan 1999	Hobart International, Australia	Hard	(United States) Chanda Rubin	2–6, 3–6
Win	2.	Jan 2001	Hobart International, Australia	Hard	(United States) Jennifer Hopkins	0–6, 6–3, 6–3
Win	3.	Oct 2001	Bratislava Open, Slovakia	Carpet (i)	(Slovakia) Martina Suchá	6–1, 6–1
Win	4.	Mar 2003	Morocco Open	Clay	(Italy) Antonella Serra Zanetti	6–2, 4–6, 6–1

=== Doubles: 12 (5 titles, 7 runner-ups) ===
Result	No.	Date	Tournament	Surface	Partner	Opponents	Score
Loss	1.	May 1990	Taranto Trophy, Italy	Clay	(Italy) Silvia Farina Elia	(Soviet Union) Elena Brioukhovets (Soviet Union) Eugenia Maniokova	6–7, 1–6
Loss	2.	Feb 1997	Paris Indoor, France	Hard (i)	(France) Alexandra Fusai	(Czech Republic) Jana Novotná (Switzerland) Martina Hingis	3–6, 0–6
Winner	3.	Jun 1999	Rosmalen Open, Netherlands	Grass	(Italy) Silvia Farina Elia	(Zimbabwe) Cara Black (Netherlands) Kristie Boogert	7–5, 7–6
Loss	4.	Jan 2000	Australian Women's Hardcourts	Hard	(Belgium) Sabine Appelmans	(France) Julie Halard-Decugis (Russia) Anna Kournikova	3–6, 0–6
Win	5.	Jan 2000	Hobart International, Australia	Hard	(France) Émilie Loit	(Belgium) Kim Clijsters (Australia) Alicia Molik	6–2, 2–6, 6–3
Win	6.	Jul 2000	Palermo International, Italy	Clay	(Italy) Silvia Farina Elia	(Romania) Ruxandra Dragomir (Spain) Virginia Ruano Pascual	6–4, 0–6, 7–6^{(8–6)}
Loss	7.	July 2000	Warsaw Open, Poland	Clay	(Sweden) Åsa Carlsson	(Spain) Virginia Ruano Pascual (Argentina) Paola Suárez	5–7, 1–6
Loss	8.	Oct 2000	China Open	Hard (i)	(United States) Meghann Shaughnessy	(United States) Lilia Osterloh (Thailand) Tamarine Tanasugarn	5–7, 1–6
Win	9.	Jan 2001	Auckland Open, New Zealand	Hard	(France) Alexandra Fusai	(Switzerland) Emmanuelle Gagliardi (Austria) Barbara Schett	7–6^{(9–7)}, 6–3
Loss	10.	Apr 2001	Porto Open, Portugal	Clay	(France) Alexandra Fusai	(Spain) María José Martínez Sánchez (Spain) Anabel Medina Garrigues	1–6, 7–6^{(7–5)}, 5–7
Win	11.	Jan 2002	Hobart International, Australia	Hard	(Italy) Tathiana Garbin	(Australia) Catherine Barclay (Australia) Christina Wheeler	6–2, 7–6^{(7–3)}
Loss	12.	May 2003	Madrid Open, Spain	Clay	(Indonesia) Angelique Widjaja	(South Africa) Liezel Huber (United States) Jill Craybas	4–6, 6–7^{(6–8)}

== ITF finals ==
$100,000 tournaments
$75,000 tournaments
$50,000 tournaments
$25,000 tournaments
$10,000 tournaments

=== Singles: 3 (1–2) ===
Result	No.	Date	Tournament	Surface	Opponent	Score
Loss	1.	29 March 1993	ITF Moulins, France	Hard	(Slovakia) Katarína Studeníková	2–6, 2–6
Loss	2.	10 May 1993	ITF Putignato, Italy	Hard	(Italy) Laura Garrone	6–2, 3–6, 1–6
Win	3.	1 November 1993	ITF Vilamoura, Portugal	Hard	(Germany) Anca Barna	6–0, 6–2

=== Doubles: 4 (3–1) ===
Result	No.	Date	Tournament	Surface	Partner	Opponents	Score
Win	1.	3 August 1992	ITF Nicolosi, Italy	Clay	(Italy) Laura Lapi	(Italy) Emanuela Brusati (Italy) Germana Di Natale	6–4, 6–2
Win	2.	24 March 1993	ITF Reims, France	Clay	(Italy) Marzia Grossi	(Moldova) Svetlana Komleva (Ukraine) Olga Lugina	6–4, 6–4
Win	3.	13 June 1994	ITF Sezze, Italy	Clay	(Italy) Laura Garrone	(Argentina) Laura Montalvo (Spain) Silvia Ramón-Cortés	6–4, 6–4
Loss	4.	11 October 1999	ITF Bordeaux, France	Hard (i)	(France) Alexandra Fusai	(France) Émilie Loit (Sweden) Åsa Carlsson	2–6, 6–7^{(5)}

== Best Grand Slam results details ==
=== Singles ===
	Australian Open	
2001 Australian Open
Round	Opponent	Score
1R	(Spain) Gala León García	6–2, 7–6^{(7–2)}
2R	(United States) Amy Frazier (16)	6–4, 6–1
3R	(Australia) Evie Dominikovic (WC)	6–3, 6–4
4R	(Switzerland) Martina Hingis (1)	0–6, 3–6
2002 Australian Open (20th Seed)
Round	Opponent	Score
1R	(Argentina) Clarisa Fernández (Q)	7–6^{(7–4)}, 6–4
2R	(Netherlands) Kristie Boogert (Q)	7–6^{(7–4)}, 7–5
3R	(Uzbekistan) Iroda Tulyaganova (16)	6–3, 5–7, 6–4
4R	(United States) Jennifer Capriati (1)	3–6, 6–7^{(9–11)}

	French Open	
2001 French Open
Round	Opponent	Score
1R	(Croatia) Iva Majoli	1–6, 6–4, 6–2
2R	(Germany) Jana Kandarr	6–2, 6–4
3R	(Spain) Cristina Torrens Valero	6–3, 6–1
4R	(Hungary) Petra Mandula (Q)	2–6, 3–6

	Wimbledon Championships	
2004 Wimbledon
Round	Opponent	Score
1R	(Italy) Mara Santangelo	7–5, 7–5
2R	(Spain) Arantxa Parra Santonja	5–7, 6–2, 6–3
3R	(France) Virginie Razzano (Q)	6–4, 4–6, 6–3
4R	(Argentina) Paola Suárez (9)	6–4, 0–6, 2–6

	US Open	
1996 US Open
Round	Opponent	Score
1R	(France) Alexia Dechaume-Balleret	6–3, 6–0
2R	(Slovenia) Tina Križan (LL)	6–2, 6–0
3R	(Belgium) Els Callens	7–5, 6–1
4R	(Austria) Judith Wiesner	0–6, 3–6

=== Doubles ===
	Australian Open	
2001 Australian Open (9th Seed)
with (France) Alexandra Fusai
Round	Opponents	Score
1R	(Bulgaria) Lubomira Bacheva / (Spain) Cristina Torrens Valero	6–4, 6–2
2R	(Chinese Taipei) Janet Lee / (Indonesia) Wynne Prakusya	1–6, 6–1, 6–1
3R	(Australia) Rachel McQuillan / (Australia) Lisa McShea	7–5, 4–6, 6–4
QF	(United States) Nicole Arendt / (Japan) Ai Sugiyama (2)	5–7, 3–6

	French Open	
1999 French Open
with (Belgium) Els Callens
Round	Opponents	Score
1R	(Germany) Christina Singer / (Czech Republic) Helena Vildová	6–4, 6–2
2R	(Australia) Alicia Molik / (United States) Corina Morariu	0–6, 6–4, 6–2
3R	(Belgium) Laurence Courtois / (United States) Meghann Shaughnessy	7–6^{(7–3)}, 7–6^{(9–7)}
QF	(United States) Serena Williams / (United States) Venus Williams (9)	0–6, 5–7
2002 French Open
with (Switzerland) Patty Schnyder
Round	Opponents	Score
1R	(Czech Republic) Lenka Němečková / (Romania) Andreea Vanc	6–7^{(4–7)}, 6–3, 6–3
2R	(South Africa) Amanda Coetzer / (United States) Lori McNeil (13)	4–6, 6–3, 7–5
3R	(Slovenia) Maja Matevžič / (Serbia and Montenegro) Dragana Zarić	6–3, 6–3
QF	(United States) Nicole Arendt / (South Africa) Liezel Huber (9)	4–6, 6–7^{(6–8)}

	Wimbledon Championships	
1997 Wimbledon (13th Seed)
with (France) Alexandra Fusai
Round	Opponents	Score
1R	(Argentina) Mercedes Paz / (France) Anne-Gaëlle Sidot	6–3, 6–0
2R	(United Kingdom) Shirli-Ann Siddall / (United Kingdom) Amanda Wainwright (WC)	2–6, 6–1, 6–3
3R	(United States) Lindsay Davenport / (Czech Republic) Jana Novotná (3)	1–6, 1–6
1998 Wimbledon
with (United States) Ginger Helgeson-Nielsen
Round	Opponents	Score
1R	(Belgium) Sabine Appelmans / (Netherlands) Miriam Oremans (13)	5–7, 6–1, 9–7
2R	(South Korea) Kim Eun-ha / (Japan) Miho Saeki	6–3, 6–3
3R	(United States) Lisa Raymond / (Australia) Rennae Stubbs (7)	7–5, 0–6, 3–6

	US Open	
1996 US Open
with (Russia) Elena Makarova
Round	Opponents	Score
1R	(Slovenia) Tina Križan / (Greece) Christína Papadáki	6–3, 7–6
2R	(Argentina) Laura Montalvo / (Germany) Barbara Rittner	6–2, 7–6
3R	(Canada) Patricia Hy-Boulais / (South Africa) Rosalyn Fairbank	1–6, 1–6
2004 US Open
with (Italy) Flavia Pennetta
Round	Opponents	Score
1R	(Czech Republic) Denisa Chládková / (Czech Republic) Libuše Průšová	6–1, 7–5
2R	(Italy) Silvia Farina Elia / (Italy) Francesca Schiavone (14)	6–4, 6–3
3R	(Russia) Svetlana Kuznetsova / (Russia) Elena Likhovtseva (2)	2–6 ret.

== Head-to-head records ==
- Lindsay Davenport 0-2
- Martina Hingis 0-3
- Dominique Monami 1-3
- Dinara Safina 0-1
