= WTA Madrid Open (tennis) =

Madrid Open

Defunct tennis tournament
- Tour: WTA Tour (Tier II) (1996); WTA Tour (Tier III) (1997–2003)
- Founded: 1996
- Abolished: 2003
- Editions: 8
- Location: Madrid, Spain
- Venue: Club de Tenis Chamartín (1996–98); Club de Campo Villa de Madrid (1999–2003)
- Surface: Clay

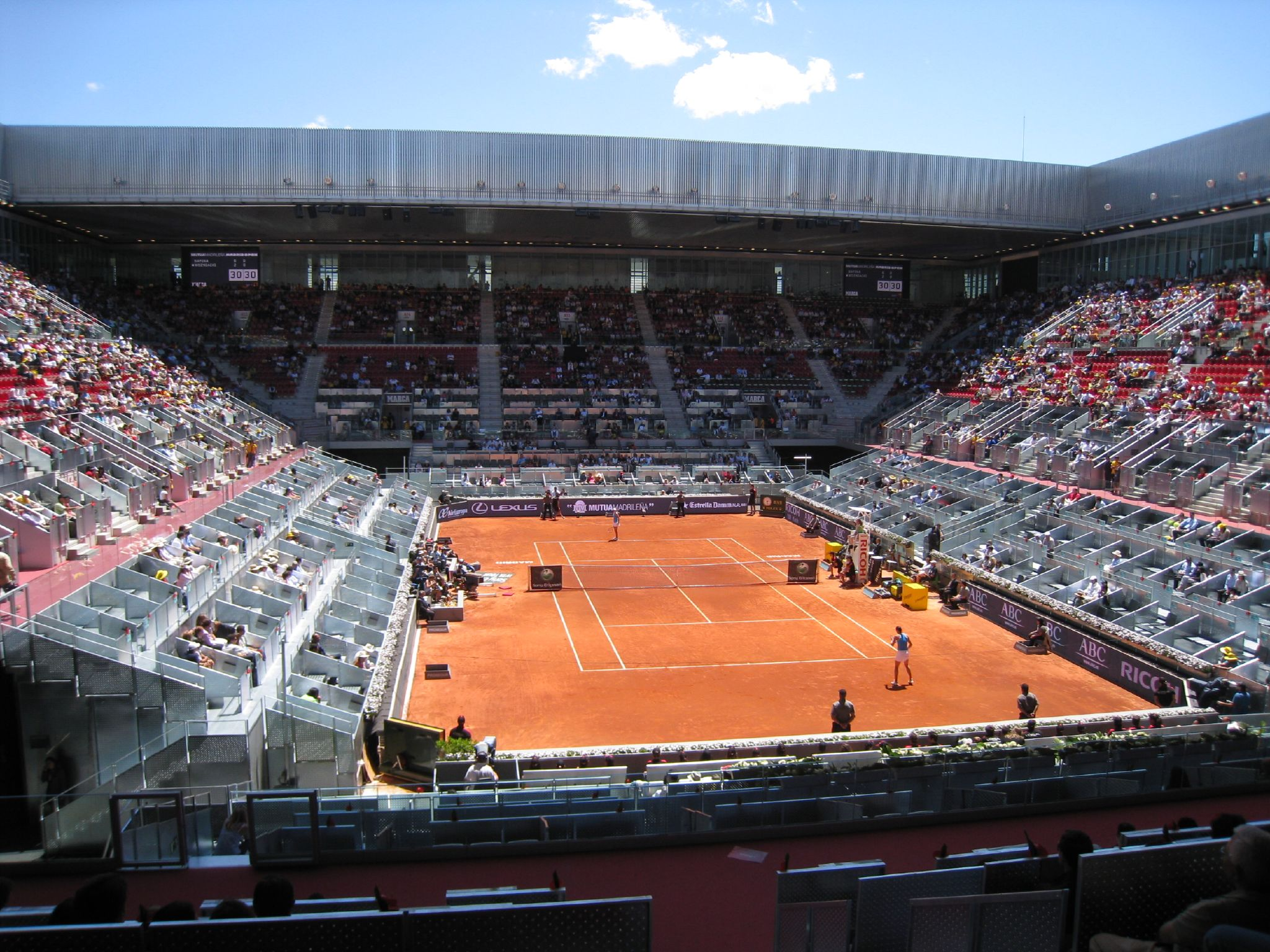

The Madrid Open is a defunct tennis tournament on the WTA Tour, held between 1996 and 2003. It replaced the International Championships of Spain (held in Barcelona) during these years, before a new tournament was started in Barcelona in 2007. It was a Tier II event in 1996 but was lowered to Tier III from 1997 onwards until it finished in 2003.

Jana Novotná was the most successful player at the event, winning the singles title in 1996 and 1997. Monica Seles and Chanda Rubin also reached the final on two occasions, each winning the title once.

== Champions ==
=== Singles ===
| Year | Champions | Runners-up | Score |
|---|---|---|---|
↓ Tier II tournament ↓
| 1996 | (Czech Republic) Jana Novotná | (Bulgaria) Magdalena Maleeva | 4–6, 6–4, 6–3 |
↓ Tier III tournament ↓
| 1997 | (Czech Republic) Jana Novotná | (United States) Monica Seles | 7–5, 6–1 |
| 1998 | (Switzerland) Patty Schnyder | (Belgium) Dominique Monami | 3–6, 6–4, 6–0 |
| 1999 | (United States) Lindsay Davenport | (Argentina) Paola Suárez | 6–1, 6–3 |
| 2000 | (Spain) Gala León García | (Colombia) Fabiola Zuluaga | 4–6, 6–2, 6–2 |
| 2001 | (Spain) Arantxa Sánchez Vicario | (Spain) Ángeles Montolio | 7–5, 6–0 |
| 2002 | (United States) Monica Seles | (United States) Chanda Rubin | 6–4, 6–2 |
| 2003 | (United States) Chanda Rubin | (Spain) María Sánchez Lorenzo | 6–4, 5–7, 6–4 |

=== Doubles ===
| Year | Champions | Runners-up | Score |
|---|---|---|---|
↓ Tier II tournament ↓
| 1996 | (Czech Republic) Jana Novotná (Spain) Arantxa Sánchez Vicario | (Belgium) Sabine Appelmans (Netherlands) Miriam Oremans | 7–6, 6–2 |
↓ Tier III tournament ↓
| 1997 | (United States) Mary Joe Fernandez (Spain) Arantxa Sánchez Vicario | (Argentina) Inés Gorrochategui (Romania) Irina Spîrlea | 6–3, 6–2 |
| 1998 | (Argentina) Florencia Labat (Belgium) Dominique Monami | (Australia) Rachel McQuillan (Australia) Nicole Pratt | 6–3, 6–1 |
| 1999 | (Spain) Virginia Ruano Pascual (Argentina) Paola Suárez | (Argentina) María Fernanda Landa (Germany) Marlene Weingärtner | 6–2, 0–6, 6–0 |
| 2000 | (United States) Lisa Raymond (Australia) Rennae Stubbs | (Spain) Gala León García (Spain) María Sánchez Lorenzo | 6–1, 6–3 |
| 2001 | (Spain) Virginia Ruano Pascual (Argentina) Paola Suárez | (United States) Lisa Raymond (Australia) Rennae Stubbs | 7–5, 2–6, 7–6 |
| 2002 | (United States) Martina Navratilova (Belarus) Natasha Zvereva | (Paraguay) Rossana de los Ríos (Spain) Arantxa Sánchez Vicario | 6–2, 6–3 |
| 2003 | (United States) Jill Craybas (South Africa) Liezel Huber | (Italy) Rita Grande (Indonesia) Angelique Widjaja | 6–4, 7–6 |

== See also ==
- Spanish Open
- Madrid Open
- Madrid Tennis Grand Prix
- List of tennis tournaments
