= Germana Di Natale =

Italian tennis player

- Country (sports): Italy
- Born: 2 April 1974 (age 52) Rome, Italy
- Height: 1.70 m (5 ft 7 in)
- Plays: Right-handed
- Prize money: $86,385

Singles
- Career record: 152–177
- Career titles: 1 ITF
- Highest ranking: No. 149 (12 June 2000)

Doubles
- Career record: 55–68
- Career titles: 4 ITF
- Highest ranking: No. 314 (25 July 1994)
Medal record
Representing Italy
Summer Universiade
Bronze medal – third place	1997 Catania	Singles

Germana Di Natale (born 2 April 1974) is a former professional tennis player from Italy.

== Biography ==
A right-handed player, Di Natale started playing tennis at the age of ten and began touring in the early 1990s.

Di Natale was a singles bronze medalist at the 1997 Summer Universiade.

As a professional player, she is most noted for her quarterfinal appearance as a qualifier at the 2000 WTA Madrid Open, where she had a win over the top seed Mary Pierce en route. Starting the tournament with a ranking of 258, she upset the world's sixth-ranked player, Pierce, with a straight-sets second-round win. In the quarterfinals, she had to retire hurt while trailing Iva Majoli by a set due to an injury to her right arm.

During her career, she competed in the qualifying draws of all four Grand Slam tournaments.

== ITF finals ==
=== Singles (1–2) ===
$100,000 tournaments
$75,000 tournaments
$50,000 tournaments
$25,000 tournaments
$10,000 tournaments

Result	No.	Date	Tournament	Surface	Opponent	Score
Loss	1.	24 January 1994	Pontevedra, Spain	Carpet	(Spain) Paula Hermida	6–7, 6–3, 2–6
Win	1.	12 May 1996	Le Touquet, France	Clay	(Belgium) Patty Van Acker	6–3, 7–6
Loss	2.	20 April 1997	Angilli, Italy	Clay	(Romania) Oana Elena Golimbioschi	5–7, 2–6

=== Doubles (4–5) ===
Result	No.	Date	Tournament	Surface	Partner	Opponents	Score
Loss	1.	3 August 1992	Nicolosi, Italy	Clay	(Italy) Emanuela Brusati	(Italy) Rita Grande (Italy) Laura Lapi	4–6, 2–6
Loss	2.	2 August 1993	Dublin, Ireland	Clay	(France) Vanina Casanova	(Argentina) Mariana Díaz Oliva (Argentina) Valentina Solari	6–4, 3–6, 2–6
Loss	3.	30 August 1993	Massa, Italy	Clay	(Italy) Giulia Toschi	(Italy) Alice Canepa (Italy) Giulia Casoni	6–7, 1–6
Win	1.	17 January 1994	Orense, Spain	Carpet	(Slovakia) Patrícia Marková	(Netherlands) Stephanie Gomperts (Netherlands) Nathalie Thijssen	7–5, 6–3
Win	2.	19 June 1995	Elvas, Portugal	Hard	(Portugal) Joana Pedroso	(United States) Bonnie Bleecker (Portugal) Manuela Costa	5–7, 7–5, 6–3
Loss	4.	22 April 1996	Bari, Italy	Clay	(Romania) Andreea Vanc	(Czech Republic) Jana Macurová (Czech Republic) Olga Vymetálková	4–6, 6–4, 5–7
Win	3.	30 March 1997	Dinard, France	Clay	(Italy) Federica Fortuni	(France) Magalie Lamarre (Sweden) Anna-Karin Svensson	6–4, 7–5
Win	4.	4 February 2001	Mallorca, Spain	Clay	(Romania) Andreea Vanc	(Russia) Raissa Gourevitch (Russia) Dinara Safina	7–5, 3–6, 6–4
Loss	5.	25 March 2001	Cholet, France	Clay (i)	(Greece) Eleni Daniilidou	(Ukraine) Yuliya Beygelzimer (Australia) Anastasia Rodionova	1–6, 6–7^{(7–5)}
