= María Sánchez Lorenzo =

Spanish tennis player (born 1977)

- Country (sports): Spain
- Residence: Barcelona, Spain
- Born: 7 November 1977 (age 47); Salamanca, Spain
- Height: 1.71 m (5 ft 7 in)
- Turned pro: 1994
- Retired: 2006
- Plays: Right (two-handed both sides)
- Prize money: $1,268,365

Singles
- Career record: 308–283
- Career titles: 1 WTA, 9 ITF
- Highest ranking: No. 33 (5 April 2004)

Grand Slam singles results
- Australian Open: 4R (1999)
- French Open: 3R (1999, 2003)
- Wimbledon: 3R (1999)
- US Open: 3R (2003)

Doubles
- Career record: 44–59
- Career titles: 1 ITF
- Highest ranking: No. 78 (19 June 2006)

Grand Slam doubles results
- Australian Open: 2R (2006)
- French Open: 2R (2006)
- Wimbledon: 2R (2005, 2006)
- US Open: 1R (2006)

Team competitions
- Fed Cup: 3–7

María Antonia Sánchez Lorenzo (born 7 November 1977) is a former professional tennis player from Spain.

Her highest WTA ranking has been world No. 33, a position she achieved in April 2004.

She played two-handed on both sides, and her favourite surface was the hardcourt, unusual for a Spanish tennis player.

At the 2005 French Open, Lorenzo defeated reigning champion Anastasia Myskina in three sets in the first round, which became the first time the reigning champ of the French Open lost in the first round.

== WTA career finals ==
=== Singles: 3 (1 title, 2 runner-ups) ===
Legend
Tier I (0–0)
Tier II (0–0)
Tier III (0–2)
Tier IV & V (1–0)

Result	W-L	Date	Tournament	Surface	Opponent	Score
Win	1–0	Aug 1999	Knokke-Heist, Belgium	Clay	(Czech Republic) Denisa Chládková	6–7, 6–4, 6–2
Loss	1–1	May 2003	Madrid, Spain	Clay	(United States) Chanda Rubin	4–6, 7–5, 4–6
Loss	1–2	Feb 2004	Bogotá, Colombia	Clay	(Colombia) Fabiola Zuluaga	6–3, 4–6, 2–6

=== Doubles: 3 (3 runner-ups) ===
Legend
Tier I (0–0)
Tier II (0–0)
Tier III (0–2)
Tier IV & V (0–1)

Result	W-L	Date	Tournament	Surface	Partner	Opponents	Score
Loss	0–1	Jul 1999	Sopot, Poland	Clay	(Spain) Gala León García	(Argentina) Laura Montalvo (Argentina) Paola Suárez	4–6, 3–6
Loss	0–2	May 2000	Madrid, Spain	Clay	(Spain) Gala León García	(United States) Lisa Raymond (Australia) Rennae Stubbs	1–6, 3–6
Loss	0–3	May 2006	Estoril, Portugal	Clay	(Argentina) Gisela Dulko	(China) Li Ting (China) Sun Tiantian	2–6, 2–6

== Performance timeline ==
Key
W	F	SF	QF	#R	RR	Q#	DNQ	A	NH

(W) winner; (F) finalist; (SF) semifinalist; (QF) quarterfinalist; (#R) rounds 4, 3, 2, 1; (RR) round-robin stage; (Q#) qualification round; (DNQ) did not qualify; (A) absent; (NH) not held; (SR) strike rate (events won / competed); (W–L) win–loss record.

Tournament	1996	1997	1998	1999	2000	2001	2002	2003	2004	2005	2006	W–L
Australian Open	2R	1R	1R	4R	1R	1R	A	1R	1R	1R	3R	6–10
French Open	2R	A	1R	3R	1R	1R	A	3R	2R	2R	1R	7–9
Wimbledon	1R	2R	1R	3R	1R	A	1R	1R	2R	2R	1R	5–10
US Open	1R	1R	1R	2R	2R	A	A	3R	1R	2R	1R	5–9
Win–loss	2–4	1–3	0–4	8–4	1–4	0–2	0–1	4–4	2–4	3–4	2–4	23–38
Year-end ranking	117	53	71	41	99	215	110	42	52	83	137	

== ITF Circuit finals ==
$100,000 tournaments
$75,000 tournaments
$50,000 tournaments
$25,000 tournaments
$10,000 tournaments

=== Singles (9–3) ===
Result	No.	Date	Tournament	Surface	Opponent	Score
Win	1.	17 May 1993	ITF Tortosa, Spain	Clay	(Spain) Ángeles Montolio	6–2, 7–5
Win	2.	27 June 1994	ITF Cáceres, Spain	Clay	(France) Nathalie Herreman	6–4, 6–4
Loss	3.	24 July 1995	ITF Valladolid, Spain	Clay	(Germany) Claudia Porwik	4–6, 2–6
Win	4.	23 February 1997	ITF Redbridge, United Kingdom	Hard (i)	(Ukraine) Elena Tatarkova	6–1, 6–4
Win	5.	7 April 1997	ITF Athens, Greece	Hard (i)	(Portugal) Sofia Prazeres	6–7^{(7)}, 6–1, 7–6^{(4)}
Win	6.	10 August 1998	ITF Bratislava, Slovakia	Clay	(Czech Republic) Radka Bobková	3–6, 6–2, 6–2
Win	7.	14 September 1998	ITF Bordeaux, France	Clay	(Hungary) Rita Kuti-Kis	6–1, 6–4
Win	8.	15 May 2000	ITF Porto, Portugal	Clay	(Spain) Virginia Ruano Pascual	6–4, 4–6, 6–3
Win	9.	18 March 2002	ITF Juarez, Mexico	Clay	(Austria) Evelyn Fauth	4–6, 6–2, 6–1
Win	10.	29 March 2002	ITF San Luis Potosí, Mexico	Clay	(Hungary) Melinda Czink	7–5, 7–5
Loss	11.	7 July 2002	ITF Orbetello, Italy	Clay	(Russia) Evgenia Kulikovskaya	1–6, 5–7
Loss	12.	8 October 2005	Barcelona Ladies Open, Spain	Clay	(Czech Republic) Kateřina Böhmová	6–3, 3–6, 5–7

=== Doubles (1–2) ===
Result	No.	Date	Tournament	Surface	Partner	Opponents	Score
Loss	1.	27 June 1994	ITF Cáceres, Spain	Hard	(Spain) Mariam Ramón Climent	(Spain) Gala León García (Spain) Janet Souto	6–4, 2–6, 1–6
Loss	2.	11 September 2000	ITF Bordeaux, France	Clay	(Spain) Lourdes Domínguez Lino	(France) Virginie Razzano (Austria) Melanie Schnell	6–2, 5–7, 3–6
Win	3.	7 October 2005	Barcelona Ladies Open, Spain	Clay	(Spain) Lourdes Domínguez Lino	(Spain) Conchita Martínez Granados (Spain) María José Martínez Sánchez	7–5, 6–7^{(4)}, 7–6^{(3)}

== Top 10 wins ==
Season	2005	Total
Wins	1	1

#	Player	Rank	Event	Surface	Rd	Score
2005
1.	(Russia) Anastasia Myskina	No. 6	French Open	Clay	1R	6–4, 4–6, 6–0
