= Gala León García =

Spanish tennis player (born 1973)

- Country (sports): Spain
- Residence: Barcelona, Spain
- Born: 23 December 1973 (age 52) Madrid, Spain
- Height: 1.63 m (5 ft 4 in)
- Turned pro: 1990
- Retired: 2004
- Plays: Left-handed (one-handed backhand)
- Prize money: US$ 1,053,309

Singles
- Career record: 277–224
- Career titles: 1 WTA, 6 ITF
- Highest ranking: No. 27 (25 September 2000)

Grand Slam singles results
- Australian Open: 1R (1997, 1998, 1999, 2000, 2001, 2002, 2004)
- French Open: 4R (1996, 1999)
- Wimbledon: 3R (1997)
- US Open: 3R (1998)

Doubles
- Career record: 77–73
- Career titles: 2 ITF
- Highest ranking: No. 107 (12 June 2000)

Grand Slam doubles results
- Australian Open: 1R (2001)
- Wimbledon: Q1 (1996)
- US Open: 2R (1995)

Gala León García (born 23 December 1973) is a former professional tennis player from Spain. On 21 September 2014, she was announced as the new Davis Cup captain for the Spanish national men's tennis team.

== WTA Tour finals ==
=== Singles: 5 (1 title, 4 runner-ups) ===
Legend
Tier I
Tier II
Tier III (1–2)
Tier IV & V (0–2)

Result	W/L	Date	Tournament	Surface	Opponent	Score
Loss	0–1	Jul 1998	Maria Lankowitz, Austria	Clay	(Switzerland) Patty Schnyder	2–6, 6–4, 3–6
Win	1–1	May 2000	Madrid, Spain	Clay	(Colombia) Fabiola Zuluaga	4–6, 6–2, 6–2
Loss	1–2	Jul 2000	Sopot, Poland	Clay	(Germany) Anke Huber	6–7^{(4–7)}, 3–6
Loss	1–3	Jul 2001	Knokke-Heist, Belgium	Clay	(Uzbekistan) Iroda Tulyaganova	2–6, 3–6
Loss	1–4	Jul 2001	Sopot, Poland	Clay	(Spain) Cristina Torrens Valero	2–6, 2–6

=== Doubles: 2 (runner-ups) ===
Legend
Tier III (0–2)
Tier IV & V

Result	W/L	Date	Tournament	Surface	Partner	Opponents	Score
Loss	0–1	Jul 1999	Sopot, Poland	Clay	(Spain) María Sánchez Lorenzo	(Argentina) Laura Montalvo (Argentina) Paola Suárez	4–6, 3–6
Loss	0–2	May 2000	Madrid, Spain	Clay	(Spain) María Sánchez Lorenzo	(United States) Lisa Raymond (Australia) Rennae Stubbs	1–6, 3–6

== ITF Circuit finals ==
Legend
$75,000 tournaments
$50,000 tournaments
$25,000 tournaments
$10,000 tournaments

=== Singles: 11 (6–5) ===
Result	No.	Date	Tournament	Surface	Opponent	Score
Win	1.	8 February 1993	ITF Faro, Portugal	Hard	(Portugal) Sofia Prazeres	6–3, 6–3
Loss	2.	15 March 1993	ITF Zaragoza, Spain	Clay	(Netherlands) Chantal Reuter	3–6, 6–4, 3–6
Win	3.	22 March 1993	ITF Madrid, Spain	Hard	(Czech Republic) Lenka Němečková	6–3, 6–4
Loss	4.	28 March 1994	ITF Alicante, Spain	Clay	(China) Yi Jingqian	6–7^{(2)}, 7–6^{(7)}, 2–6
Win	5.	22 May 1995	ITF Barcelona, Spain	Hard	(Belarus) Vera Zhukovets	6–0, 6–0
Win	6.	10 July 1995	ITF Vigo, Spain	Hard	(Spain) Estefanía Bottini	6–0, 6–1
Win	7.	17 July 1995	ITF Getxo, Spain	Clay	(Greece) Christína Papadáki	6–3, 6–4
Loss	8.	13 May 1996	ITF Athens, Greece	Clay	(Spain) Cristina Torrens Valero	4–6, 4–6
Win	9.	9 June 1997	ITF Budapest, Hungary	Clay	(Argentina) Mariana Díaz Oliva	7–5, 6–2
Loss	10.	11 August 1997	ITF Bratislava, Slovakia	Clay	(Slovakia) Henrieta Nagyová	4–6, 0–6
Loss	11.	8 September 2003	Open Denain, France	Clay	(Spain) Anabel Medina Garrigues	4–6, 0–6

=== Doubles: 8 (2–6) ===
Result	No.	Date	Tournament	Surface	Partner	Opponents	Score
Loss	1.	May 1992	ITF Barcelona, Spain	Hard	(Spain) Rosa Bielsa	(Argentina) Paola Suárez (Argentina) Pamela Zingman	4–6, 2–6
Loss	2.	Mar 1993	ITF Zaragoza, Spain	Hard	(Spain) Silvia Ramón-Cortés	(Czech Republic) Dominika Gorecká (Czech Republic) Lenka Němečková	4–6, 1–6
Loss	3.	Nov 1993	ITF Vilamoura, Portugal	Hard	(Spain) Ana Segura	(Poland) Magdalena Feistel (Poland) Katharzyna Teodorowicz	6–7, 2–6
Loss	4.	Feb 1994	Open de Valencia, Spain	Clay	(Spain) Janet Souto	(Netherlands) Seda Noorlander (Netherlands) Hanneke Ketelaars	4–6, 4–6
Win	1.	Jun 1994	ITF Cáceres, Spain	Hard	(Spain) Janet Souto	(Spain) Mariam Ramón Climent (Spain) María Sánchez Lorenzo	4–6, 6–2, 6–1
Loss	5.	Sep 1997	ITF Mollerusa, Spain	Clay	(Spain) Marta Cano	(Spain) Patricia Aznar (Spain) Paula Hermida	7–5, 3–6, 3–6
Win	2.	Oct 2002	ITF Girona, Spain	Clay	(Bulgaria) Lubomira Bacheva	(Italy) Flavia Pennetta (Romania) Andreea Ehritt-Vanc	6–4, 6–3
Loss	6.	Sep 2003	ITF Fano, Italy	Clay	(Argentina) María Emilia Salerni	(Spain) Conchita Martínez Granados (Italy) Giulia Casoni	3–6, 3–6

== Grand Slam singles performance timeline ==
Key
W	F	SF	QF	#R	RR	Q#	DNQ	A	NH

(W) winner; (F) finalist; (SF) semifinalist; (QF) quarterfinalist; (#R) rounds 4, 3, 2, 1; (RR) round-robin stage; (Q#) qualification round; (DNQ) did not qualify; (A) absent; (NH) not held; (SR) strike rate (events won / competed); (W–L) win–loss record.

Tournament	1996	1997	1998	1999	2000	2001	2002	2003	2004	W–L
Australian Open	A	1R	1R	1R	1R	1R	1R	A	1R	0–7
French Open	4R	1R	3R	4R	2R	1R	1R	2R	2R	11–9
Wimbledon	1R	3R	1R	1R	2R	1R	1R	1R	1R	3–9
US Open	1R	2R	3R	2R	1R	2R	1R	1R	A	5–8
Win–loss	3–3	3–4	4–4	4–4	2–4	1–4	0–4	1–3	1–3	19–33
