= 1999 Toyota Princess Cup – Doubles =

Doubles
- 1999 Toyota Princess Cup

Final
- Champions: (Spain) Conchita Martínez (Argentina) Patricia Tarabini
- Runners-up: (South Africa) Amanda Coetzer (Australia) Jelena Dokic
- Score: 6–7^{(5–7)}, 6–4, 6–2

Details
- Draw: 16
- Seeds: 4

Events
Singles	Doubles
← 1998 ·	Toyota Princess Cup	· 2000 →

The 1999 Toyota Princess Cup doubles was the tennis doubles event of the third edition of the first hardcourt tournament after the US Open. Anna Kournikova and Monica Seles were the reigning champions, but neither competed this time.

Conchita Martínez and Patricia Tarabini won their second event of the year, defeating Amanda Coetzer and Jelena Dokic in the final.

== Seeds ==
1. (United States) Lindsay Davenport / (United States) Corina Morariu (quarterfinals)
2. (Spain) Conchita Martínez / (Argentina) Patricia Tarabini (champions)
3. (United States) Lori McNeil / (United States) Kimberly Po (semifinals)
4. (France) Julie Halard-Decugis / (France) Amélie Mauresmo (quarterfinals)

== Draw ==
=== Key ===
- Q = Qualifier
- WC = Wild card
- LL = Lucky loser
- Alt = Alternate
- ITF = ITF entry
- PR = Protected ranking
- SR = Special ranking
- SE = Special exempt
- JE = Junior exempt
- JR = Junior Accelerator Programme entrant
- CO = College Accelerator Programme entrant
- NG = Next Gen Accelerator Program entrant
- w/o = Walkover
- r = Retired
- d = Defaulted

First round
1	(United States) L Davenport (United States) C Morariu	6	6
(Japan) S Asagoe (Japan) A Sugiyama	2	1
(Canada) M Drake (Thailand) T Tanasugarn	2	4
(South Africa) A Coetzer (Australia) J Dokic	6	6
3	(United States) L McNeil (United States) K Po	6	6
(South Korea) S-h Park (United States) M Tu	2	3
Q	(Japan) H Inoue (Japan) M Inoue	6	6^{7}	6
(Belarus) O Barabanschikova (Croatia) S Talaja	4	7^{9}	2
(Japan) M Saeki (Japan) Y Yoshida	6	7
(United States) J Chi (United States) A Frazier	2	5
(Australia) C Barclay (Australia) N Pratt	3	4
4	(France) J Halard-Decugis (France) A Mauresmo	6	6
(Canada) R Kolbovic (Canada) V Webb	3	6	6
(Australia) K-A Guse (Japan) R Hiraki	6	4	4
WC	(United States) T Snyder (United States) M Viele	2	1
2	(Spain) C Martínez (Argentina) P Tarabini	6	6

Quarterfinals
1	(United States) L Davenport (United States) C Morariu	4	6	6^{5}
(South Africa) A Coetzer (Australia) J Dokic	6	0	7^{7}
3	(United States) L McNeil (United States) K Po	6	6
Q	(Japan) H Inoue (Japan) M Inoue	3	2
(Japan) M Saeki (Japan) Y Yoshida	7	6
4	(France) J Halard-Decugis (France) A Mauresmo	5	4
(Canada) R Kolbovic (Canada) V Webb	4	6^{4}
2	(Spain) C Martínez (Argentina) P Tarabini	6	7^{7}

Semifinals
(South Africa) A Coetzer (Australia) J Dokic	3	7	7
3	(United States) L McNeil (United States) K Po	6	5	5
WC	(Japan) M Saeki (Japan) Y Yoshida	6^{2}	3
2	(Spain) C Martínez (Argentina) P Tarabini	7^{5}	6

Final
(South Africa) A Coetzer (Australia) J Dokic	7^{7}	4	2
2	(Spain) C Martínez (Argentina) P Tarabini	6^{7}	6	6

== Qualifying ==
=== Seeds ===
1. (Japan) Tomoe Hotta / (Japan) Hiroko Mochizuki (first round)
2. (Slovenia) Petra Rampre / (United States) Tracy Singian (first round)

=== Qualifiers ===
1. (Japan) Haruka Inoue / (Japan) Maiko Inoue

== Qualifying draw ==
=== Key ===
- Q = Qualifier
- WC = Wild card
- LL = Lucky loser
- Alt = Alternate
- ITF = ITF entry
- PR = Protected ranking
- SR = Special ranking
- SE = Special exempt
- JE = Junior exempt
- JR = Junior Accelerator Programme entrant
- CO = College Accelerator Programme entrant
- NG = Next Gen Accelerator Program entrant
- w/o = Walkover
- r = Retired
- d = Defaulted

First round
1	(Japan) Tomoe Hotta (Japan) Hiroko Mochizuki	5
(Japan) Haruka Inoue (Japan) Maiko Inoue	8
(Japan) Riei Otakeyama (Japan) Yoshiko Sasano	9
(Japan) Kaori Aoyama (Japan) Rika Fujiwara	7
WC	(Japan) Azusa Konishi (Japan) Remi Uda	0
(Uzbekistan) Iroda Tulyaganova (Switzerland) Miroslava Vavrinec	8
(Japan) Shiho Hisamatsu (Germany) Marketa Kochta	8
2	(Slovenia) Petra Rampre (United States) Tracy Singian	2

Second round
(Japan) Haruka Inoue (Japan) Maiko Inoue	8
(Japan) Riei Otakeyama (Japan) Yoshiko Sasano	3
(Uzbekistan) Iroda Tulyaganova (Switzerland) Miroslava Vavrinec	8
(Japan) Shiho Hisamatsu (Germany) Marketa Kochta	3

Qualifying competition
(Japan) Haruka Inoue (Japan) Maiko Inoue	8
(Uzbekistan) Iroda Tulyaganova (Switzerland) Miroslava Vavrinec	4
