= 1999 Toyota Princess Cup – Singles =

Singles
- 1999 Toyota Princess Cup

Final
- Champion: (United States) Lindsay Davenport
- Runner-up: (United States) Monica Seles
- Score: 7–5, 7–6^{(7–1)}

Details
- Draw: 28
- Seeds: 8

Events
Singles	Doubles
← 1998 ·	Toyota Princess Cup	· 2000 →

The 1999 Toyota Princess Cup singles was the tennis singles event of the third edition of the first hardcourt tournament after the US Open. Monica Seles was the two-time defending champion, but was defeated by Lindsay Davenport in the final to win the title.

== Seeds ==
1. (United States) Lindsay Davenport (champion)
2. (United States) Monica Seles (final)
3. (France) Julie Halard-Decugis (quarterfinals)
4. (South Africa) Amanda Coetzer (quarterfinals)
5. (France) Amélie Mauresmo (quarterfinals)
6. (Spain) Conchita Martínez (quarterfinals)
7. (United States) Amy Frazier (semifinals)
8. (Japan) Ai Sugiyama (semifinals)

== Draw ==
=== Key ===
- Q = Qualifier
- WC = Wild card
- LL = Lucky loser
- Alt = Alternate
- ITF = ITF entry
- PR = Protected ranking
- SR = Special ranking
- SE = Special exempt
- JE = Junior exempt
- JR = Junior Accelerator Programme entrant
- CO = College Accelerator Programme entrant
- NG = Next Gen Accelerator Program entrant
- w/o = Walkover
- r = Retired
- d = Defaulted

=== Finals ===
Semifinals
1	(United States) Lindsay Davenport	6	6
7	(United States) Amy Frazier	2	1
8	(Japan) Ai Sugiyama	3	6^{3}
2	(United States) Monica Seles	6	7^{7}

Final
1	(United States) Lindsay Davenport	7	7^{7}
2	(United States) Monica Seles	5	6^{1}

=== Top half ===
First round
(United States) C Morariu	6	5	1
(Israel) A Smashnova	2	7	6
Q	(Japan) S Asagoe	6	6
Q	(Canada) V Webb	4	1
LL	(United States) T Singian	6	3	1
5	(France) A Mauresmo	2	6	6
(Belarus) O Barabanschikova	4	2
(Canada) M Drake	6	6
(Croatia) S Talaja	6^{4}	6	3
Q	(Japan) Y Yoshida	7^{7}	4	6
LL	(South Korea) S-h Park	1	4
7	(United States) A Frazier	6	6

Second round
1	(United States) L Davenport	6	6
(Israel) A Smashnova	0	1
Q	(Japan) S Asagoe	2	5
5	(France) A Mauresmo	6	7
4	(South Africa) A Coetzer	4	6	6
(Canada) M Drake	6	3	4
Q	(Japan) Y Yoshida	3	2
7	(United States) A Frazier	6	6

Quarterfinals
1	(United States) L Davenport	6	6
5	(France) A Mauresmo	1	1
4	(South Africa) A Coetzer	0	4
7	(United States) A Frazier	6	6

Semifinals
1	(United States) L Davenport	6	6
7	(United States) A Frazier	2	1

=== Bottom half ===
First round
8	(Japan) A Sugiyama	6	6
(Thailand) T Tanasugarn	3	3
WC	(United States) M Viele	3	1
(United States) J Chi	6	6
(Australia) N Pratt	6	7
(United States) M Tu	3	5
6	(Spain) C Martínez	6	6
(Australia) J Dokic	3	2
WC	(Japan) M Saeki	1	1
(Russia) T Panova	6	6
(United States) T Snyder	1	1
Q	(Switzerland) M Vavrinec	6	6

Second round
8	(Japan) A Sugiyama	6	6
(United States) J Chi	2	4
(Australia) N Pratt	1	0
3	(France) J Halard-Decugis	6	6
6	(Spain) C Martínez	6	6
(Russia) T Panova	1	1
Q	(Switzerland) M Vavrinec	2	0
2	(United States) M Seles	6	6

Quarterfinals
8	(Japan) A Sugiyama	6	7
3	(France) J Halard-Decugis	2	5
6	(Spain) C Martínez	2	0
2	(United States) M Seles	6	6

Semifinals
8	(Japan) A Sugiyama	3	6^{3}
2	(United States) M Seles	6	7^{7}

== Qualifying ==
=== Seeds ===
1. (Switzerland) Miroslava Vavrinec (Qualifier)
2. (Australia) Kerry-Anne Guse (first round)
3. (Japan) Shinobu Asagoe (Qualifier)
4. (Japan) Yuka Yoshida (Qualifier)
5. (Canada) Renata Kolbovic (second round)
6. (Canada) Vanessa Webb (Qualifier)
7. (Slovenia) Petra Rampre (second round)
8. (United States) Tracy Singian (qualifying competition)

=== Qualifiers ===
1. (Switzerland) Miroslava Vavrinec
2. (Japan) Shinobu Asagoe
3. (Japan) Yuka Yoshida
4. (Canada) Vanessa Webb

=== Lucky losers ===
1. (United States) Tracy Singian
2. (South Korea) Park Sung-hee

== Qualifying draw ==
=== Key ===
- Q = Qualifier
- WC = Wild card
- LL = Lucky loser
- Alt = Alternate
- ITF = ITF entry
- PR = Protected ranking
- SR = Special ranking
- SE = Special exempt
- JE = Junior exempt
- JR = Junior Accelerator Programme entrant
- CO = College Accelerator Programme entrant
- NG = Next Gen Accelerator Program entrant
- w/o = Walkover
- r = Retired
- d = Defaulted

=== First qualifier ===
First round
1	(Switzerland) Miroslava Vavrinec	6	6
Alt	(Germany) Catherine Turinsky	3	2
(Japan) Madoka Kuki	6	6
WC	(Japan) Azusa Konishi	1	2
(South Korea) Park Sung-hee	6	6
(Japan) Maiko Inoue	3	0
(Japan) Tomoe Hotta	2	1
7	(Slovenia) Petra Rampre	6	6

Second round
1	(Switzerland) Miroslava Vavrinec	6	6
(Japan) Madoka Kuki	3	3
(South Korea) Park Sung-hee	3	6	6
7	(Slovenia) Petra Rampre	6	1	1

Qualifying competition
1	(Switzerland) Miroslava Vavrinec	6	7
(South Korea) Park Sung-hee	1	5

=== Second qualifier ===
First round
3	(Japan) Shinobu Asagoe	6	6
(Uzbekistan) Iroda Tulyaganova	0	2
(Australia) Catherine Barclay	4	1
(Germany) Vanessa Henke	6	6
(South Korea) Kim Eun-ha	6^{2}	1
(Japan) Haruka Inoue	7^{7}	6
WC	(Japan) Remi Uda	2	3
5	(Canada) Renata Kolbovic	6	6

Second round
3	(Japan) Shinobu Asagoe	7	6
(Germany) Vanessa Henke	5	3
(Japan) Haruka Inoue	2	6	6
5	(Canada) Renata Kolbovic	6	3	2

Qualifying competition
3	(Japan) Shinobu Asagoe	2	7^{7}	7
(Japan) Haruka Inoue	6	6^{2}	5

=== Third qualifier ===
First round
8	(United States) Tracy Singian	6	7
(Japan) Hiroko Mochizuki	3	5
WC	(Japan) Rika Fujiwara	6^{7}	6	6
WC	(Japan) Kaori Aoyama	7^{9}	3	2
(Japan) Akiko Morigami	5	4
(South Korea) Cho Yoon-jeong	7	6
(Japan) Miyako Ataka	0	1
4	(Japan) Yuka Yoshida	6	6

Second round
8	(United States) Tracy Singian	6	6
WC	(Japan) Rika Fujiwara	3	3
(South Korea) Cho Yoon-jeong	1	1
4	(Japan) Yuka Yoshida	6	6

Qualifying competition
8	(United States) Tracy Singian	4	3
4	(Japan) Yuka Yoshida	6	6

=== Fourth qualifier ===
First round
6	(Canada) Vanessa Webb	6	6
(Japan) Yoshiko Sasano	1	3
(Germany) Marketa Kochta	6	6
(Japan) Keiko Nagatomi	0	3
(Japan) Riei Otakeyama	7^{7}	6
(Japan) Rika Hiraki	6^{3}	4
(Japan) Shiho Hisamatsu	6^{7}	6	6
2	(Australia) Kerry-Anne Guse	7^{9}	3	4

Second round
6	(Canada) Vanessa Webb	1	6	6
(Germany) Marketa Kochta	6	1	3
(Japan) Riei Otakeyama	6	3	3
(Japan) Shiho Hisamatsu	4	6	6

Qualifying competition
6	(Canada) Vanessa Webb	6	6
(Japan) Shiho Hisamatsu	2	1
