= 2000 Mexx Benelux Open – Singles =

Singles
- 2000 Mexx Benelux Open

Final
- Champion: (South Africa) Amanda Coetzer
- Runner-up: (Spain) Cristina Torrens Valero
- Score: 4–6, 6–2, 6–3

Details
- Draw: 32 (2WC/4Q/1LL)
- Seeds: 8

Events
Singles	Doubles
← 1999 ·	Belgian Open	· 2001 →

Justine Henin was the defending champion, and did not compete this year.

Amanda Coetzer won the title by defeating Cristina Torrens Valero 4–6, 6–2, 6–3 in the final.

== Seeds ==
1. (South Africa) Amanda Coetzer (champion)
2. (Belgium) Sabine Appelmans (quarterfinals)
3. (Belgium) Kim Clijsters (second round)
4. (Spain) Ángeles Montolio (quarterfinals)
5. (Slovakia) Karina Habšudová (second round)
6. (Sweden) Åsa Carlsson (second round)
7. (Canada) Jana Nejedly (quarterfinals)
8. (United States) Meghann Shaughnessy (quarterfinals)

== Draw ==
Key

- Q = Qualifier
- WC = Wild card
- LL = Lucky loser
- Alt = Alternate
- ITF = ITF entry
- PR = Protected ranking
- SR = Special ranking
- SE = Special exempt
- JE = Junior exempt
- JR = Junior Accelerator Programme entrant
- CO = College Accelerator Programme entrant
- NG = Next Gen Accelerator Program entrant
- w/o = Walkover
- r = Retired
- d = Defaulted

=== Finals ===
Semifinals
1	(South Africa) Amanda Coetzer	6	6
(Belgium) Laurence Courtois	0	3
(Croatia) Jelena Kostanić	4	2
(Spain) Cristina Torrens Valero	6	6

Final
1	(South Africa) Amanda Coetzer	4	6	6
(Spain) Cristina Torrens Valero	6	2	3

=== Top half ===
First round
1	(South Africa) A Coetzer	7	6
(Belgium) E Callens	5	2
(Switzerland) M Vavrinec	7	7^{8}
LL	(Ukraine) T Kovalchuk	5	6^{6}
Q	(Czech Republic) M Paštiková	1	6	6
(Federal Republic of Yugoslavia) S Načuk	6	2	4
(Germany) M Babel	6	2	4
8	(United States) M Shaughnessy	1	6	6
3	(Belgium) K Clijsters	7^{8}	6
(Slovakia) D Hantuchová	6^{6}	1
(Germany) B Rittner	6^{6}	2
(Bulgaria) L Bacheva	7^{8}	6
(Belgium) L Courtois	1	6	6
Q	(Czech Republic) L Průšová	6	3	3
(United States) H Parkinson	5	7^{7}	1
5	(Slovakia) K Habšudová	7	6^{4}	6

Second round
1	(South Africa) A Coetzer	6	6
(Switzerland) M Vavrinec	1	2
Q	(Czech Republic) M Paštiková	5	5
8	(United States) M Shaughnessy	7	7
3	(Belgium) K Clijsters	2	2
(Bulgaria) L Bacheva	6	6
(Belgium) L Courtois	6	6
5	(Slovakia) K Habšudová	0	2

Quarterfinals
1	(South Africa) A Coetzer	6	6
8	(United States) M Shaughnessy	1	3
(Bulgaria) L Bacheva	7^{7}	3	4
(Belgium) L Courtois	6^{3}	6	6

Semifinals
1	(South Africa) A Coetzer	6	6
(Belgium) L Courtois	0	3

=== Bottom half ===
First round
6	(Sweden) Å Carlsson	4	7	6
(Canada) S Jeyaseelan	6	5	2
(Croatia) J Kostanić	7	6
(United States) B Rippner	5	2
Q	(United States) T Almeda-Singian	6	3	7
WC	(Belgium) P Van Acker	4	6	5
WC	(Netherlands) M Gerards	4	2
4	(Spain) Á Montolio	6	6
7	(Canada) N Nejedly	3	4
(France) A Cocheteux	6	6
(United States) J Hopkins	6	6
(Slovakia) H Nagyová	3	2
(Spain) C Torrens Valero	6	7
Q	(Slovenia) P Rampre	2	5
(Czech Republic) S Kleinová	2	6	4
2	(Belgium) S Appelmans	6	1	6

Second round
6	(Sweden) Å Carlsson	3	2
(Croatia) J Kostanić	6	6
Q	(United States) T Almeda-Singian	3	2
4	(Spain) Á Montolio	6	6
(France) A Cocheteux
(United States) J Hopkins	w/o
(Spain) C Torrens Valero	3	7^{7}	6
2	(Belgium) S Appelmans	6	6^{4}	4

Quarterfinals
(Croatia) J Kostanić	7^{7}	7^{7}
4	(Spain) Á Montolio	6^{5}	6^{5}
(United States) J Hopkins	6	4	4
(Spain) C Torrens Valero	0	6	6

Semifinals
(Croatia) J Kostanić	4	2
(Spain) C Torrens Valero	6	6
