= 2000 Mexx Benelux Open – Doubles =

Doubles
- 2000 Mexx Benelux Open

Final
- Champions: (Belgium) Sabine Appelmans (Belgium) Kim Clijsters
- Runners-up: (United States) Jennifer Hopkins (Slovenia) Petra Rampre
- Score: 6–1, 6–1

Details
- Draw: 16 (1WC/1Q/1LL)
- Seeds: 4

Events
| Singles | Doubles |
| ← 1999 · | Belgian Open | · 2001 → |

Laura Golarsa and Katarina Srebotnik were the defending champions, but none competed this year. Golarsa was injured and couldn't play in the entire season, while Srebotnik competed in the Fed Cup at the same week.

Sabine Appelmans and Kim Clijsters won the title by defeating Jennifer Hopkins and Petra Rampre 6–1, 6–1 in the final.

== Seeds ==
1. (Sweden) Åsa Carlsson / (Canada) Sonya Jeyaseelan (semifinals)
2. (Belgium) Els Callens / (Slovakia) Karina Habšudová (quarterfinals)
3. (Germany) Barbara Rittner / (United States) Meghann Shaughnessy (first round)
4. (Croatia) Jelena Kostanić / (Federal Republic of Yugoslavia) Sandra Načuk (first round)

== Draw ==
Key

- Q = Qualifier
- WC = Wild card
- LL = Lucky loser
- Alt = Alternate
- ITF = ITF entry
- PR = Protected ranking
- SR = Special ranking
- SE = Special exempt
- JE = Junior exempt
- JR = Junior Accelerator Programme entrant
- CO = College Accelerator Programme entrant
- NG = Next Gen Accelerator Program entrant
- w/o = Walkover
- r = Retired
- d = Defaulted

=== Draw ===
First round
1 | (Sweden) Å Carlsson (Canada) S Jeyaseelan | 6 | 2 | 7^{8}
(United States) T Almeda-Singian (Canada) R Kolvobic | 3 | 6 | 6^{6}
WC | (Netherlands) D Haak (Netherlands) A van den Hurk | 3 | 7 | 5
(United States) H Parkinson (United States) B Rippner | 6 | 5 | 7
4 | (Croatia) J Kostanić (Federal Republic of Yugoslavia) S Načuk | 3 | 3
(United States) J Hopkins (Slovenia) P Rampre | 6 | 6
Q | (Ukraine) T Kovalchuk (Germany) S Schmidle | 6 | 6
(South Africa) K Grant (United States) R Jensen | 3 | 3
(Bulgaria) L Bacheva (Uzbekistan) I Tulyaganova | 7 | 6
(Slovakia) D Hantuchová (Slovakia) H Nagyová | 5 | 0
(France) C Dhenin (France) S Schoeffel | 4 | 6 | 6
3 | (Germany) B Rittner (United States) M Shaughnessy | 6 | 2 | 1
(Czech Republic) S Kleinová (Czech Republic) M Paštiková | 4 | 3
(Belgium) S Appelmans (Belgium) K Clijsters | 6 | 6
LL | (Belgium) E Clijsters (Belgium) C Maes | 1 | 1
2 | (Belgium) E Callens (Slovakia) K Habšudová | 6 | 6

Quarterfinals
1 | (Sweden) Å Carlsson (Canada) S Jeyaseelan | 6 | 1 | 6
(United States) H Parkinson (United States) B Rippner | 2 | 6 | 3
(United States) J Hopkins (Slovenia) P Rampre | 7 | 7
Q | (Ukraine) T Kovalchuk (Germany) S Schmidle | 5 | 5
(Bulgaria) L Bacheva (Uzbekistan) I Tulyaganova | 6 | 6
(France) C Dhenin (France) S Schoeffel | 3 | 4
(Belgium) S Appelmans (Belgium) K Clijsters | 6 | 6
2 | (Belgium) E Callens (Slovakia) K Habšudová | 3 | 4

Semifinals
1 | (Sweden) Å Carlsson (Canada) S Jeyaseelan | 3 | 7^{7} | 3
(United States) J Hopkins (Slovenia) P Rampre | 6 | 6^{5} | 6
(Bulgaria) L Bacheva (Uzbekistan) I Tulyaganova
(Belgium) S Appelmans (Belgium) K Clijsters | w/o

Final
(United States) J Hopkins (Slovenia) P Rampre | 1 | 1
(Belgium) S Appelmans (Belgium) K Clijsters | 6 | 6
