= 1999 Toyota Princess Cup =

- Date: 20–26 September
- Edition: 3rd
- Category: Tier II
- Draw: 28S / 16D
- Prize money: $520,000
- Surface: Hard / outdoor
- Location: Tokyo, Japan

Champions

Singles
- (United States) Lindsay Davenport

Doubles
- (Spain) Conchita Martínez / (Argentina) Patricia Tarabini
← 1998 ·	Toyota Princess Cup	· 2000 →

The 1999 Toyota Princess Cup was a women's tennis tournament played on outdoor hard courts in Tokyo, Japan. It was part of Tier II of the 1999 WTA Tour. It was the third edition of the tournament and was held from 20 September through 26 September 1999. First-seeded Lindsay Davenport won the singles title and earned $80,000 first-prize money.

== Finals ==
=== Singles ===
(United States) Lindsay Davenport defeated (United States) Monica Seles, 7–5, 7–6^{(7–1)}

- This was Davenport's fifth singles title of the year and the 24th of her career.

=== Doubles ===
(Spain) Conchita Martínez / (Argentina) Patricia Tarabini defeated (South Africa) Amanda Coetzer / (Australia) Jelena Dokić, 6–7^{(7–9)}, 6–4, 6–2

== Entrants ==
=== Seeds ===
Country	Player	Rank	Seed
USA	Lindsay Davenport	2	1
USA	Monica Seles	5	2
FRA	Julie Halard-Decugis	8	3
RSA	Amanda Coetzer	9	4
FRA	Amélie Mauresmo	14	5
ESP	Conchita Martínez	16	6
USA	Amy Frazier	22	7
JPN	Ai Sugiyama	28	8

=== Other entrants ===
The following players received wildcards into the singles main draw:

- (United States) Monique Viele
- (Japan) Miho Saeki

The following players received wildcards into the doubles main draw:

- (United States) Tara Snyder / (United States) Monique Viele

The following players received entry from the singles qualifying draw:

- (Japan) Shinobu Asagoe
- (Canada) Vanessa Webb
- (Japan) Yuka Yoshida
- (Switzerland) Miroslava Vavrinec

The following players received entry as lucky losers:

- (United States) Tracy Singian
- (South Korea) Park Sung-hee

The following players received entry from the doubles qualifying draw:

- (Japan) Haruka Inoue / (Japan) Maiko Inoue
