= 2002 Toyota Princess Cup – Singles =

Singles
- 2002 Toyota Princess Cup

Final
- Champion: (United States) Serena Williams
- Runner-up: (Belgium) Kim Clijsters
- Score: 2–6, 6–3, 6–3

Details
- Draw: 28 (4WC/3Q)
- Seeds: 8

Events
Singles	Doubles
← 2001 ·	Toyota Princess Cup

Jelena Dokic was the defending champion, but lost in semifinals to Kim Clijsters.

Serena Williams won the title by defeating Kim Clijsters 2–6, 6–3, 6–3 in the final.

== Seeds ==
The first four seeds received a bye into the second round.

1. (United States) Serena Williams (champion)
2. (Federal Republic of Yugoslavia) Jelena Dokic (semifinals)
3. (Belgium) Kim Clijsters (final)
4. (Israel) Anna Smashnova (second round)
5. (Japan) Ai Sugiyama (second round)
6. (Russia) Tatiana Panova (quarterfinals)
7. (Thailand) Tamarine Tanasugarn (quarterfinals)
8. (Spain) Arantxa Sánchez Vicario (second round)

== Draw ==
=== Key ===
- Q = Qualifier
- WC = Wild card
- LL = Lucky loser
- Alt = Alternate
- SE = Special exempt
- PR = Protected ranking
- ITF = ITF entry
- JE = Junior exempt
- w/o = Walkover
- r = Retired
- d = Defaulted
- SR = Special ranking

=== Finals ===
Semifinals
1	(United States) Serena Williams	7^{7}	6
(United States) Amy Frazier	6^{0}	3
3	(Belgium) Kim Clijsters	5	6	6
2	(Federal Republic of Yugoslavia) Jelena Dokic	7	2	3

Final
1	(United States) Serena Williams	2	6	6
3	(Belgium) Kim Clijsters	6	3	3

=== Top half ===
First round
WC	(Japan) S Obata	4	7	3
(Austria) P Wartusch	6	5	6
WC	(Spain) G León García	3	6^{4}
(Australia) N Pratt	6	7^{7}
WC	(Japan) S Asagoe	4	1
5	(Japan) A Sugiyama	6	6
(United States) A Frazier	4	6	6
(Switzerland) E Gagliardi	6	4	2
Q	(Australia) A Molik	6	6
(Spain) C Torrens Valero	4	2
(Slovakia) H Nagyová	2	6	4
6	(Russia) T Panova	6	1	6

Second round
1	(United States) S Williams	6	6
(Austria) P Wartusch	0	2
(Australia) N Pratt	6	4	6
5	(Japan) A Sugiyama	3	6	3
4	(Israel) A Smashnova	4	3
(United States) A Frazier	6	6
Q	(Australia) A Molik	5	4
6	(Russia) T Panova	7	6

Quarterfinals
1	(United States) S Williams	6	6
(Australia) N Pratt	1	0
(United States) A Frazier	2	6	6
6	(Russia) T Panova	6	1	4

Semifinals
1	(United States) S Williams	7^{7}	6
(United States) A Frazier	6^{0}	3

=== Bottom half ===
First round
8	(Spain) A Sánchez Vicario	6	6
(Slovenia) M Matevžič	2	0
(Spain) C Martínez	2	6	2
(Russia) E Likhovtseva	6	4	6
(Slovenia) T Pisnik	0^{r}
Q	(Russia) S Kuznetsova	5
7	(Thailand) T Tanasugarn	6	7^{7}
(Italy) Ad Serra Zanetti	2	6^{3}
Q	(Hungary) P Mandula	5	2
(Argentina) C Fernández	7	6
Q	(Croatia) S Talaja	3	4
(Russia) L Krasnoroutskaya	6	6

Second round
8	(Spain) A Sánchez Vicario	2	7^{7}	4
(Russia) E Likhovtseva	6	6^{1}	6
Q	(Russia) S Kuznetsova	4	6	5
3	(Belgium) K Clijsters	6	0	7
7	(Thailand) T Tanasugarn	6	6
(Argentina) C Fernández	4	4
(Russia) L Krasnoroutskaya	2	6^{5}
2	(Federal Republic of Yugoslavia) J Dokic	6	7^{7}

Quarterfinals
(Russia) E Likhovtseva	2	2
3	(Belgium) K Clijsters	6	6
7	(Thailand) T Tanasugarn	3	1
2	(Federal Republic of Yugoslavia) J Dokic	6	6

Semifinals
3	(Belgium) K Clijsters	5	6	6
2	(Federal Republic of Yugoslavia) J Dokic	7	2	3
