= 1999 Flanders Women's Open – Doubles =

Doubles
- 1999 Flanders Women's Open

Final
- Champions: (Italy) Laura Golarsa (Slovenia) Katarina Srebotnik
- Runners-up: (Australia) Louise Pleming (United States) Meghann Shaughnessy
- Score: 6–4, 6–2

Details
- Draw: 16
- Seeds: 4

Events
Singles	Doubles
← 1993 ·	Belgian Open	· 2000 →

The 1999 Belgian Open doubles was the doubles event of the sixth edition of the Belgian Open; a WTA Tier IV tournament and the most prestigious women's tennis tournament held in Belgium on clay. The tournament had not occurred since 1993, when it was won by Radka Bobková and María José Gaidano. They did not compete this year.

Laura Golarsa and Katarina Srebotnik won the tournament without losing a set, defeating Louise Pleming and Meghann Shaughnessy in the final.

== Seeds ==
1. (Belgium) Els Callens / (France) Alexia Dechaume-Balleret (first round)
2. (Belarus) Olga Barabanschikova / (Kazakhstan) Irina Selyutina (first round)
3. (Romania) ~~Cătălina Cristea~~ / (Italy) ~~Rita Grande~~ (withdrew)
4. (Netherlands) Seda Noorlander / (Greece) Christína Papadáki (quarterfinals)

== Draw ==
=== Key ===
- Q = Qualifier
- WC = Wild card
- LL = Lucky loser
- Alt = Alternate
- ITF = ITF entry
- PR = Protected ranking
- SR = Special ranking
- SE = Special exempt
- JE = Junior exempt
- JR = Junior Accelerator Programme entrant
- CO = College Accelerator Programme entrant
- NG = Next Gen Accelerator Program entrant
- w/o = Walkover
- r = Retired
- d = Defaulted

First round
1	(Belgium) E Callens (France) A Dechaume-Balleret	4	1
(Czech Republic) E Martincová (Germany) E Wagner	6	6
(Italy) L Golarsa (Slovenia) K Srebotnik	6	6
(Chinese Taipei) J Lee (United States) K Schlukebir	4	3
4	(Netherlands) S Noorlander (Greece) C Papadáki	3	7	6
(Czech Republic) M Nekvapilová (Czech Republic) H Šromová	6	5	3
Q	(United States) J Chi (United States) M Tu	6	5	3
WC	(Belgium) J Henin (Luxembourg) A Kremer	2	7	6
(Australia) L Pleming (United States) M Shaughnessy	7^{7}	6
(Spain) RM Andrés Rodríguez (Paraguay) L Schaerer	6^{5}	2
(Brazil) V Menga (Japan) M Saeki	5	4
LL	(Belgium) K Clijsters (India) N Vaidyanathan	7	6
(Japan) K Ishida (Japan) K Nagatomi	6	3	6
(Bulgaria) L Bacheva (Germany) K Freye	3	6	3
(France) A Cocheteux (France) S Pitkowski	7	6
2	(Belarus) O Barabanschikova (Kazakhstan) I Selyutina	5	2

Quarterfinals
(Czech Republic) E Martincová (Germany) E Wagner	2	6^{2}
(Italy) L Golarsa (Slovenia) K Srebotnik	6	7^{7}
4	(Netherlands) S Noorlander (Greece) C Papadáki	6	2	4
WC	(Belgium) J Henin (Luxembourg) A Kremer	2	6	6
(Australia) L Pleming (United States) M Shaughnessy	1	6	6
LL	(Belgium) K Clijsters (India) N Vaidyanathan	6	4	2
(Japan) K Ishida (Japan) K Nagatomi	2	4
(France) A Cocheteux (France) S Pitkowski	6	6

Semifinals
(Italy) L Golarsa (Slovenia) K Srebotnik	6	6
WC	(Belgium) J Henin (Luxembourg) A Kremer	4	1
(Australia) L Pleming (United States) M Shaughnessy	7^{7}	4	7
(France) A Cocheteux (France) S Pitkowski	6^{4}	6	5

Final
(Italy) L Golarsa (Slovenia) K Srebotnik	6	6
(Australia) L Pleming (United States) M Shaughnessy	4	2

== Qualifying ==
=== Seeds ===
1. (United States) Jane Chi / (United States) Meilen Tu (Qualifiers)
2. (Belgium) Kim Clijsters / (India) Nirupama Vaidyanathan (qualifying competition, withdrew, lucky losers)

=== Qualifiers ===
1. (United States) Jane Chi / (United States) Meilen Tu

=== Lucky losers ===
1. (Belgium) Kim Clijsters / (India) Nirupama Vaidyanathan

== Qualifying draw ==
First round
1	(United States) Jane Chi (United States) Meilen Tu	w/o
(Puerto Rico) Kristina Brandi (France) Catherine Tanvier
(United States) Jill Craybas (Venezuela) María Vento	1
2	(Belgium) Kim Clijsters (India) Nirupama Vaidyanathan	8

Qualifying competition
1	(United States) Jane Chi (United States) Meilen Tu	w/o
2	(Belgium) Kim Clijsters (India) Nirupama Vaidyanathan
