= 2001 TennisCup Vlaanderen – Doubles =

Doubles
- 2001 TennisCup Vlaanderen

Final
- Champions: (Belgium) Els Callens (Spain) Virginia Ruano Pascual
- Runners-up: (Netherlands) Kristie Boogert (Netherlands) Miriam Oremans
- Score: 6–3, 3–6, 6–4

Details
- Draw: 16 (1WC/1Q)
- Seeds: 4

Events
Singles	Doubles
← 2000 ·	Belgian Open	· 2002 →

Sabine Appelmans and Kim Clijsters were the defending champions, but none competed this year. Clijsters chose to compete at Rome in the same week, losing in the second round in singles and in the first round in doubles (with Magüi Serna).

Els Callens and Virginia Ruano Pascual won the title by defeating Kristie Boogert and Miriam Oremans 6–3, 3–6, 6–4 in the final.

== Seeds ==
1. (Belgium) Els Callens / (Spain) Virginia Ruano Pascual (champions)
2. (Netherlands) Kristie Boogert / (Netherlands) Miriam Oremans (final)
3. (Chinese Taipei) Janet Lee / (Uzbekistan) Iroda Tulyaganova (semifinals)
4. (Belgium) Laurence Courtois / (Ukraine) Elena Tatarkova (quarterfinals)

== Draw ==
=== Key ===
- Q = Qualifier
- WC = Wild card
- LL = Lucky loser
- Alt = Alternate
- SE = Special exempt
- PR = Protected ranking
- ITF = ITF entry
- JE = Junior exempt
- w/o = Walkover
- r = Retired
- d = Defaulted
- SR = Special ranking

=== Draw ===
First round
1	(Belgium) E Callens (Spain) V Ruano Pascual	6	6
(Australia) E Dominikovic (Canada) R Kolbovic	4	4
(Spain) E Bes (Czech Republic) E Martincová	6	7
(Germany) V Henke (Bulgaria) S Krivencheva	2	5
4	(Belgium) L Courtois (Ukraine) E Tatarkova	6	6
(United States) S Reeves (Spain) G Riera	4	2
(Ukraine) T Perebiynis (Belarus) T Poutchek	6	6
(Germany) A Glass (Slovenia) T Pisnik	2	1
(South Africa) K Grant (Australia) T Musgrave	2	3
(France) C Dhenin (France) S Foretz	6	6
(Spain) M Ramón Climent (Spain) M Sánchez Lorenzo	2	5
3	(Chinese Taipei) J Lee (Uzbekistan) I Tulyaganova	6	7
WC	(Belgium) E Clijsters (Belgium) C Maes	5	1
(Croatia) J Kostanić (Austria) S Plischke	7	6
Q	(Greece) E Daniilidou (Germany) C Schneider	5	6^{7}
2	(Netherlands) K Boogert (Netherlands) M Oremans	7	7^{9}

Quarterfinals
1	(Belgium) E Callens (Spain) V Ruano Pascual	6	6
(Spain) E Bes (Czech Republic) E Martincová	1	3
4	(Belgium) L Courtois (Ukraine) E Tatarkova	3	4
(Ukraine) T Perebiynis (Belarus) T Poutchek	6	6
(France) C Dhenin (France) S Foretz	3	7	5
3	(Chinese Taipei) J Lee (Uzbekistan) I Tulyaganova	6	5	7
(Croatia) J Kostanić (Austria) S Plischke	4	3
2	(Netherlands) K Boogert (Netherlands) M Oremans	6	6

Semifinals
1	(Belgium) E Callens (Spain) V Ruano Pascual	6	7
(Ukraine) T Perebiynis (Belarus) T Poutchek	4	5
3	(Chinese Taipei) J Lee (Uzbekistan) I Tulyaganova	1	2
2	(Netherlands) K Boogert (Netherlands) M Oremans	6	6

Final
1	(Belgium) E Callens (Spain) V Ruano Pascual	6	3	6
2	(Netherlands) K Boogert (Netherlands) M Oremans	3	6	4
