= 1998 Toyota Princess Cup – Singles =

Singles
- 1998 Toyota Princess Cup
- 1997 Champion: (United States) Monica Seles

Final
- Champion: (United States) Monica Seles
- Runner-up: (Spain) Arantxa Sánchez Vicario
- Score: 4–6, 6–3, 6–4

Events
Singles	Doubles
← 1997 ·	Toyota Princess Cup	· 1999 →

Monica Seles was the defending champion and won in the final 4–6, 6–3, 6–4 against Arantxa Sánchez Vicario.

== Seeds ==
A champion seed is indicated in bold text while text in italics indicates the round in which that seed was eliminated. The top four seeds received a bye to the second round.

1. (Spain) Arantxa Sánchez Vicario (final)
2. (United States) **Monica Seles (champion)**
3. (South Africa) Amanda Coetzer (second round)
4. (Belgium) Dominique Van Roost (second round)
5. (Russia) Anna Kournikova (quarterfinals)
6. (United States) Lisa Raymond (first round)
7. (Germany) Anke Huber (semifinals)
8. (Slovakia) Henrieta Nagyová (second round)

== Draw ==
=== Key ===
- Q = Qualifier
- WC = Wild card
- LL = Lucky loser
- Alt = Alternate
- SE = Special exempt
- PR = Protected ranking
- ITF = ITF entry
- JE = Junior exempt
- w/o = Walkover
- r = Retired
- d = Defaulted
- SR = Special ranking

=== Final ===
Final
1	(Spain) Arantxa Sánchez Vicario	**6**	3	4
2	(United States) **Monica Seles**	4	**6**	**6**

=== Section 1 ===
First round
(Russia) **E Likhovtseva**	**6**	**6**
(Slovakia) J Husárová	3	4
(Chinese Taipei) **S-T Wang**	**6**	**6**
Q	(Japan) H Inoue	0	4
(Czech Republic) A Gerši	2	1
5	(Russia) **A Kournikova**	**6**	**6**
(Belarus) **O Barabanschikova**	3	**6**	**6**
WC	(Japan) M Saeki	**6**	3	3
(China) **F Li**	**6**	**6**
Q	(South Korea) M-R Jeon	2	0
Q	(Japan) N Kijimuta	3	**6**	0
7	(Germany) **A Huber**	**6**	3	**6**

Second round
1	(Spain) **A Sánchez Vicario**	**6**	**6**
(Russia) E Likhovtseva	0	4
(Chinese Taipei) S-T Wang	0	4
5	(Russia) **A Kournikova**	**6**	**6**
4	(Belgium) D Van Roost	**6**	3	5
(Belarus) **O Barabanschikova**	3	**6**	**7**
(China) F Li	5	3
7	(Germany) **A Huber**	**7**	**6**

Quarterfinals
1	(Spain) **A Sánchez Vicario**	**6**	**6**
5	(Russia) A Kournikova	3	2
(Belarus) O Barabanschikova	3	1
7	(Germany) **A Huber**	**6**	**6**

Semifinals
1	(Spain) **A Sánchez Vicario**	**6**	3	**6**
7	(Germany) A Huber	1	**6**	3

=== Section 2 ===
First round
8	(Slovakia) **H Nagyová**	**7**	**6**
Q	(Chinese Taipei) J Lee	5	1
WC	(Japan) Y Yoshida	4	3
(Thailand) **T Tanasugarn**	**6**	**6**
(United States) **A Frazier**	**6**	**6**
(Croatia) M Lučić	2	3
6	(United States) L Raymond	6	5
(United States) **M J Fernández**	**7**	**7**
(France) **J Halard-Decugis**	**6**	**6**
(United States) K Po	0	3
(Israel) A Smashnova	1	2
(Japan) **N Sawamatsu**	**6**	**6**

Second round
8	(Slovakia) H Nagyová	4	6
(Thailand) **T Tanasugarn**	**6**	**7**
(United States) **A Frazier**	0	**6**	**6**
3	(South Africa) A Coetzer	**6**	3	2
(United States) M J Fernández	1	3
(France) **J Halard-Decugis**	**6**	**6**
(Japan) N Sawamatsu	3	**6**	3
2	(United States) **M Seles**	**6**	3	**6**

Quarterfinals
(Thailand) **T Tanasugarn**	**6**	**6**
(United States) A Frazier	1	3
(France) J Halard-Decugis	2	1
2	(United States) **M Seles**	**6**	**6**

Semifinals
(Thailand) T Tanasugarn	1	4
2	(United States) **M Seles**	**6**	**6**
