= 2001 TennisCup Vlaanderen – Singles =

Singles
- 2001 TennisCup Vlaanderen

Final
- Champion: (Germany) Barbara Rittner
- Runner-up: (Czech Republic) Klára Koukalová
- Score: 6–3, 6–2

Details
- Draw: 32 (2WC/4Q)
- Seeds: 8

Events
Singles	Doubles
← 2000 ·	Belgian Open	· 2002 →

Amanda Coetzer was the defending champion, but did not compete this year.

Barbara Rittner won the title by defeating Klára Koukalová 6–3, 6–2 in the final.

== Seeds ==
1. (Thailand) Tamarine Tanasugarn (first round)
2. (United States) Jennifer Hopkins (first round)
3. (Spain) Cristina Torrens Valero (first round)
4. (Israel) Anna Smashnova (quarterfinals)
5. (Germany) Barbara Rittner (champion)
6. (Uzbekistan) Iroda Tulyaganova (first round)
7. (New Zealand) Pavlina Nola (first round)
8. (Spain) Virginia Ruano Pascual (quarterfinals)

== Draw ==
=== Key ===
- Q = Qualifier
- WC = Wild card
- LL = Lucky loser
- Alt = Alternate
- SE = Special exempt
- PR = Protected ranking
- ITF = ITF entry
- JE = Junior exempt
- w/o = Walkover
- r = Retired
- d = Defaulted
- SR = Special ranking

=== Finals ===
Semifinals
Q	(Czech Republic) Klára Koukalová	3	6	6
Q	(Spain) Eva Bes	6	4	1
5	(Germany) Barbara Rittner	6	6
(Spain) Anabel Medina Garrigues	0	2

Final
Q	(Czech Republic) Klára Koukalová	3	2
5	(Germany) Barbara Rittner	6	6

=== Top half ===
First round
1	(Thailand) T Tanasugarn	4	6	5
Q	(Ukraine) T Perebiynis	6	4	7
Q	(Czech Republic) K Koukalová	6	6
(Belarus) T Poutchek	4	1
WC	(Belgium) L Courtois	7^{7}	5	6
Q	(Czech Republic) A Vašková	6^{2}	7	1
(Switzerland) M Vavrinec	6	6
6	(Uzbekistan) I Tulyaganova	2	3
3	(Spain) C Torrens Valero	4	0
(Netherlands) K Boogert	6	6
(France) S Pitkowski	3	6	6^{3}
Q	(Spain) E Bes	6	1	7^{7}
(Germany) A Glass	4	6	5
(Spain) MJ Martínez Sánchez	6	2	7
WC	(Belgium) E Callens	6	6
7	(New Zealand) P Nola	0	2

Second round
Q	(Ukraine) T Perebiynis	6	3	0
Q	(Czech Republic) K Koukalová	3	6	6
WC	(Belgium) L Courtois	3	7^{7}	6
(Switzerland) M Vavrinec	6	6^{5}	2
(Netherlands) K Boogert	3	6	4
Q	(Spain) E Bes	6	4	6
(Spain) MJ Martínez Sánchez	6	6
WC	(Belgium) E Callens	3	4

Quarterfinals
Q	(Czech Republic) K Koukalová	6	5	6
WC	(Belgium) L Courtois	4	7	2
Q	(Spain) E Bes	6	6
(Spain) MJ Martínez Sánchez	3	3

Semifinals
Q	(Czech Republic) K Koukalová	3	6	6
Q	(Spain) E Bes	6	4	1

=== Bottom half ===
First round
5	(Germany) B Rittner	7^{8}	6
(Slovakia) Ľ Cervanová	6^{6}	1
(Australia) E Dominikovic	2	1
(Bulgaria) L Bacheva	6	6
(Netherlands) M Oremans	6	6
(Canada) J Nejedly	3	0
(Slovenia) T Pisnik	3	1
4	(Israel) A Smashnova	6	6
8	(Spain) V Ruano Pascual	6	7^{7}
(Spain) M Sánchez Lorenzo	1	6^{2}
(South Korea) E-h Kim	0	2
(Czech Republic) A Gerši	6	6
(Austria) S Plischke	4	6	2
(France) É Loit	6	1	6
(Spain) A Medina Garrigues	6	6
2	(United States) J Hopkins	3	1

Second round
5	(Germany) B Rittner	6	7^{7}
(Bulgaria) L Bacheva	2	6^{2}
(Netherlands) M Oremans	2	0
4	(Israel) A Smashnova	6	6
8	(Spain) V Ruano Pascual	6	6
(Czech Republic) A Gerši	3	4
(France) É Loit	4	1
(Spain) A Medina Garrigues	6	6

Quarterfinals
5	(Germany) B Rittner	7	5	6
4	(Israel) A Smashnova	5	7	2
8	(Spain) V Ruano Pascual	6	3	4
(Spain) A Medina Garrigues	2	6	6

Semifinals
5	(Germany) B Rittner	6	6
(Spain) A Medina Garrigues	0	2
