= 2000 Toyota Princess Cup – Singles =

Singles
- 2000 Toyota Princess Cup

Final
- Champion: (United States) Serena Williams
- Runner-up: (France) Julie Halard-Decugis
- Score: 7–5, 6–1

Details
- Draw: 28 (3WC/4Q)
- Seeds: 8

Events
Singles	Doubles
← 1999 ·	Toyota Princess Cup	· 2001 →

Lindsay Davenport was the defending champion, but did not compete this year.

Serena Williams won the title by defeating Julie Halard-Decugis 7–5, 6–1 in the final.

== Seeds ==
The first four seeds received a bye into the second round.

1. (United States) Monica Seles (semifinals, retired)
2. (United States) Serena Williams (champion)
3. (France) Amélie Mauresmo (quarterfinals)
4. (France) Julie Halard-Decugis (final)
5. (United States) Amy Frazier (quarterfinals)
6. (United States) Kristina Brandi (quarterfinals)
7. (Japan) Ai Sugiyama (second round)
8. (Australia) Jelena Dokic (quarterfinals)

== Draw ==
=== Key ===
- Q = Qualifier
- WC = Wild card
- LL = Lucky loser
- Alt = Alternate
- SE = Special exempt
- PR = Protected ranking
- ITF = ITF entry
- JE = Junior exempt
- w/o = Walkover
- r = Retired
- d = Defaulted
- SR = Special ranking

=== Finals ===
Semifinals
1	(United States) Monica Seles	4	3^{r}
4	(France) Julie Halard-Decugis	6	4
Q	(Czech Republic) Dája Bedáňová	1	4
2	(United States) Serena Williams	6	6

Final
4	(France) Julie Halard-Decugis	5	1
2	(United States) Serena Williams	7	6

=== Top half ===
First round
(Hungary) R Kuti-Kis	4	2
Q	(Switzerland) M Vavrinec	6	6
Q	(Japan) Y Yoshida	2	6	1
WC	(Japan) S Asagoe	6	3	6
WC	(United States) A Stevenson	3	3
7	(Japan) A Sugiyama	6	6
(Italy) T Garbin	4	3
(Australia) N Pratt	6	6
Q	(South Africa) J Kruger	6^{1}	6	4
(United States) C Morariu	7^{7}	2	6
(Austria) S Plischke	3	4
6	(United States) K Brandi	6	6

Second round
1	(United States) M Seles	6	6
Q	(Switzerland) M Vavrinec	4	4
WC	(Japan) S Asagoe	6	7
7	(Japan) A Sugiyama	3	5
4	(France) J Halard-Decugis	6	6
(Australia) N Pratt	1	3
(United States) C Morariu	6	5	2
6	(United States) K Brandi	2	7	6

Quarterfinals
1	(United States) M Seles	6	6
WC	(Japan) S Asagoe	3	4
4	(France) J Halard-Decugis	1	6	6
6	(United States) K Brandi	6	1	4

Semifinals
1	(United States) M Seles	4	3^{r}
4	(France) J Halard-Decugis	6	4

=== Bottom half ===
First round
5	(United States) A Frazier	6	6
(Colombia) F Zuluaga	2	1
(Spain) Á Montolio	7	5	7^{11}
(United States) L Osterloh	5	7	6^{9}
(Israel) A Smashnova	4	1
Q	(Czech Republic) D Bedáňová	6	6
8	(Australia) J Dokic	6	6
(United States) M Shaughnessy	4	2
(Italy) R Grande	3	4
WC	(Russia) L Krasnoroutskaya	6	6
(Argentina) P Suárez	3	6^{8}
(Thailand) T Tanasugarn	6	7^{10}

Second round
5	(United States) A Frazier	6	6
(Spain) Á Montolio	0	1
Q	(Czech Republic) D Bedáňová	5	6	6
3	(France) A Mauresmo	7	3	3
8	(Australia) J Dokic	6	7^{7}
WC	(Russia) L Krasnoroutskaya	4	6^{1}
(Thailand) T Tanasugarn	1	4
2	(United States) S Williams	6	6

Quarterfinals
5	(United States) A Frazier	7	6^{0}	2
Q	(Czech Republic) D Bedáňová	5	7^{7}	6
8	(Australia) J Dokic	3	4
2	(United States) S Williams	6	6

Semifinals
Q	(Czech Republic) D Bedáňová	1	4
2	(United States) S Williams	6	6
