= 2000 Toyota Princess Cup – Doubles =

Doubles
- 2000 Toyota Princess Cup

Final
- Champions: (France) Julie Halard-Decugis (Japan) Ai Sugiyama
- Runners-up: (Japan) Nana Miyagi (Argentina) Paola Suárez
- Score: 6–0, 6–2

Details
- Draw: 16
- Seeds: 4

Events
Singles	Doubles
← 1999 ·	Toyota Princess Cup	· 2001 →

Conchita Martínez and Patricia Tarabini were the defending champions, but none competed this year.

Julie Halard-Decugis and Ai Sugiyama won the title by defeating Nana Miyagi and Paola Suárez 6–0, 6–2 in the final.

== Seeds ==
1. (France) Julie Halard-Decugis / (Japan) Ai Sugiyama (champions)
2. (Japan) Nana Miyagi / (Argentina) Paola Suárez (final)
3. (Slovenia) Tina Križan / (Slovenia) Katarina Srebotnik (first round)
4. (Australia) Jelena Dokic / (United States) Corina Morariu (semifinals)

== Draw ==
Key

- Q = Qualifier
- WC = Wild card
- LL = Lucky loser
- Alt = Alternate
- ITF = ITF entry
- PR = Protected ranking
- SR = Special ranking
- SE = Special exempt
- JE = Junior exempt
- JR = Junior Accelerator Programme entrant
- CO = College Accelerator Programme entrant
- NG = Next Gen Accelerator Program entrant
- w/o = Walkover
- r = Retired
- d = Defaulted

=== Draw ===
First round
1	(France) J Halard-Decugis (Japan) A Sugiyama	7	7^{7}
(United States) L Osterloh (United States) A Stevenson	5	6^{0}
(France) A Mauresmo (Australia) N Pratt	6	7^{7}
(Australia) A Ellwood (Japan) R Hiraki	1	6^{3}
3	(Slovenia) T Križan (Slovenia) K Srebotnik	4	6	5
(Indonesia) Y Basuki (Thailand) T Tanasugarn	6	3	7
(Italy) T Garbin (Slovakia) J Husárová	6	6
(United States) A Frazier (United States) K Schlukebir	4	0
(United States) M Navratilova (United States) M Seles	6	7^{7}
(Italy) R Grande (United States) M Shaughnessy	1	6^{4}
WC	(Japan) S Asagoe (Japan) Y Yoshida	5	6	1
4	(Australia) J Dokic (United States) C Morariu	7	1	6
Q	(Chinese Taipei) J Lee (Indonesia) W Prakusya	4	6	7
(South Africa) N de Villiers (Australia) B Stewart	6	3	5
(United States) T Snyder (Canada) V Webb	1	4
2	(Japan) N Miyagi (Argentina) P Suárez	6	6

Quarterfinals
1	(France) J Halard-Decugis (Japan) A Sugiyama	4	7	6
(France) A Mauresmo (Australia) N Pratt	6	5	1
(Indonesia) Y Basuki (Thailand) T Tanasugarn	3	2
(Italy) T Garbin (Slovakia) J Husárová	6	6
(United States) M Navratilova (United States) M Seles	6^{5}	2
4	(Australia) J Dokic (United States) C Morariu	7^{7}	6
Q	(Chinese Taipei) J Lee (Indonesia) W Prakusya	3	4
2	(Japan) N Miyagi (Argentina) P Suárez	6	6

Semifinals
1	(France) J Halard-Decugis (Japan) A Sugiyama	6	7
(Italy) T Garbin (Slovakia) J Husárová	1	5
4	(Australia) J Dokic (United States) C Morariu	7	5	3
2	(Japan) N Miyagi (Argentina) P Suárez	5	7	6

Final
1	(France) J Halard-Decugis (Japan) A Sugiyama	6	6
2	(Japan) N Miyagi (Argentina) P Suárez	0	2
