= 1997 Toyota Princess Cup – Singles =

Singles
- 1997 Toyota Princess Cup

Final
- Champion: (United States) Monica Seles
- Runner-up: (Spain) Arantxa Sánchez Vicario
- Score: 6–1, 3–6, 7–6

Details
- Draw: 28
- Seeds: 8

Events
Singles	Doubles
Toyota Princess Cup	· 1998 →

Monica Seles won in the final 6–1, 3–6, 7–6 against Arantxa Sánchez Vicario.

== Seeds ==
A champion seed is indicated in bold text while text in italics indicates the round in which that seed was eliminated. The top four seeds received a bye to the second round.

1. (United States) **Monica Seles (champion)**
2. (Spain) Arantxa Sánchez Vicario (final)
3. (Spain) Conchita Martínez (quarterfinals)
4. (United States) Kimberly Po (quarterfinals)
5. (Indonesia) Yayuk Basuki (semifinals)
6. n/a
7. (Switzerland) Patty Schnyder (first round)
8. (Belarus) Natasha Zvereva (quarterfinals)
9. (Slovakia) Henrieta Nagyová (first round)

== Draw ==
=== Key ===
- Q = Qualifier
- WC = Wild card
- LL = Lucky loser
- Alt = Alternate
- ITF = ITF entry
- PR = Protected ranking
- SR = Special ranking
- SE = Special exempt
- JE = Junior exempt
- JR = Junior Accelerator Programme entrant
- CO = College Accelerator Programme entrant
- NG = Next Gen Accelerator Program entrant
- w/o = Walkover
- r = Retired
- d = Defaulted

=== Final ===
Final
1	(United States) **Monica Seles**	**6**	3	**7**
2	(Spain) Arantxa Sánchez Vicario	1	**6**	6

=== Section 1 ===
First round
(Bulgaria) M Maleeva	**6**	4	2
(Thailand) **T Tanasugarn**	0	**6**	**6**
(Japan) **A Sugiyama**	**6**	**6**
(Australia) A Ellwood	3	2
(France) J Halard-Decugis	**6**	3	2
8	(Belarus) **N Zvereva**	4	**6**	**6**
(Chinese Taipei) **S-T Wang**	4	**6**	**6**
(Japan) N Kijimuta	**6**	3	1
Q	(Japan) **M Endo**	**6**	**7**
(Spain) C Torrens Valero	4	5
(Japan) **N Sawamatsu**	2	**6**	**6**
9	(Slovakia) H Nagyová	**6**	4	1

Second round
1	(United States) **M Seles**	**6**	**6**
(Thailand) T Tanasugarn	1	4
(Japan) A Sugiyama	2	3
8	(Belarus) **N Zvereva**	**6**	**6**
3	(Spain) **C Martínez**	**6**	**6**
(Chinese Taipei) S-T Wang	1	3
Q	(Japan) M Endo	**6**	4	2
(Japan) **N Sawamatsu**	3	**6**	**6**

Quarterfinals
1	(United States) **M Seles**	**6**	**6**
8	(Belarus) N Zvereva	1	0
3	(Spain) C Martínez	6	4
(Japan) **N Sawamatsu**	**7**	**6**

Semifinals
1	(United States) **M Seles**	**6**	**6**
(Japan) N Sawamatsu	3	1

=== Section 2 ===
First round
5	(Indonesia) **Y Basuki**	**7**	**7**
(France) S Pitkowski	5	6
LL	(Japan) H Inoue	4	4
WC	(Japan) **M Saeki**	**6**	**6**
(Japan) Y Yoshida	4	1
WC	(Japan) **R Hiraki**	**6**	**6**
7	(Switzerland) P Schnyder	4	0
Q	(Venezuela) **M Vento**	**6**	**6**
(Spain) M Serna	5	5
Q	(China) **F Li**	**7**	**7**
(United States) C Rubin	4	3
Q	(Japan) **S Asagoe**	**6**	**6**

Second round
5	(Indonesia) **Y Basuki**	6	**6**	**6**
WC	(Japan) M Saeki	**7**	4	2
WC	(Japan) R Hiraki	**6**	6	3
4	(United States) **K Po**	3	**7**	**6**
Q	(Venezuela) M Vento	5	2
Q	(China) **F Li**	**7**	**6**
Q	(Japan) S Asagoe	0	0
2	(Spain) **A Sánchez Vicario**	**6**	**6**

Quarterfinals
5	(Indonesia) **Y Basuki**	**7**	**6**
4	(United States) K Po	5	3
Q	(China) F Li	3	5
2	(Spain) **A Sánchez Vicario**	**6**	**7**

Semifinals
5	(Indonesia) Y Basuki	**6**	6	4
2	(Spain) **A Sánchez Vicario**	1	**7**	**6**
