= 1997 Toyota Princess Cup – Doubles =

Doubles
- 1997 Toyota Princess Cup

Final
- Champions: (United States) Monica Seles (Japan) Ai Sugiyama
- Runners-up: (France) Julie Halard-Decugis (United States) Chanda Rubin
- Score: 6–1, 6–0

Details
- Draw: 16
- Seeds: 4

Events
Singles	Doubles
Toyota Princess Cup	· 1998 →

Monica Seles and Ai Sugiyama won in the final 6–1, 6–0 against Julie Halard-Decugis and Chanda Rubin.

== Seeds ==
Champion seeds are indicated in bold text while text in italics indicates the round in which those seeds were eliminated.

1. (United States) Gigi Fernández / (Belarus) Natasha Zvereva (first round)
2. (Indonesia) Yayuk Basuki / (Spain) Arantxa Sánchez Vicario (first round)
3. (Japan) Naoko Kijimuta / (Japan) Nana Miyagi (semifinals)
4. (Spain) Conchita Martínez / (Argentina) Patricia Tarabini (quarterfinals)

== Draw ==
=== Key ===
- Q = Qualifier
- WC = Wild card
- LL = Lucky loser
- Alt = Alternate
- ITF = ITF entry
- PR = Protected ranking
- SR = Special ranking
- SE = Special exempt
- JE = Junior exempt
- JR = Junior Accelerator Programme entrant
- CO = College Accelerator Programme entrant
- NG = Next Gen Accelerator Program entrant
- w/o = Walkover
- r = Retired
- d = Defaulted

First round
1	(United States) G Fernández (Belarus) N Zvereva	**6**	1	5
(South Korea) **S-H Park** (Chinese Taipei) **S-T Wang**	2	**6**	**7**
(Slovakia) **H Nagyová** (Switzerland) **P Schnyder**	**6**	**7**
(Japan) K Nagatomi (Japan) S Obata	4	5
4	(Spain) **C Martínez** (Argentina) **P Tarabini**	**6**	**6**
(United States) E deLone (Australia) N Pratt	2	1
(France) **J Halard-Decugis** (United States) **C Rubin**	**6**	**6**
WC	(Bulgaria) M Maleeva (Japan) N Sawamatsu	4	4
(Japan) S Asagoe (Japan) M Endo	2	3
(Japan) **R Hiraki** (United States) **K Po**	**6**	**6**
(Canada) M Drake (Japan) K Takuma	3	1
3	(Japan) **N Kijimuta** (Japan) **N Miyagi**	**6**	**6**
(Australia) **A Ellwood** (Thailand) **T Tanasugarn**	**6**	**6**
(Japan) M Saeki (Japan) Y Yoshida	1	4
(United States) **M Seles** (Japan) **A Sugiyama**	**6**	**6**
2	(Indonesia) Y Basuki (Spain) A Sánchez Vicario	4	4

Quarterfinals
(South Korea) **S-H Park** (Chinese Taipei) **S-T Wang**	**6**	**7**
(Slovakia) H Nagyová (Switzerland) P Schnyder	3	5
4	(Spain) C Martínez (Argentina) P Tarabini	5	3
(France) **J Halard-Decugis** (United States) **C Rubin**	**7**	**6**
(Japan) R Hiraki (United States) K Po	**6**	6	2
3	(Japan) **N Kijimuta** (Japan) **N Miyagi**	2	**7**	**6**
(Australia) A Ellwood (Thailand) T Tanasugarn	**6**	3	2
(United States) **M Seles** (Japan) **A Sugiyama**	1	**6**	**6**

Semifinals
(South Korea) S-H Park (Chinese Taipei) S-T Wang	**6**	3	3
(France) **J Halard-Decugis** (United States) **C Rubin**	2	**6**	**6**
3	(Japan) N Kijimuta (Japan) N Miyagi	6	2
(United States) **M Seles** (Japan) **A Sugiyama**	**7**	**6**

Final
(France) Julie Halard-Decugis (United States) Chanda Rubin	1	0
(United States) **Monica Seles** (Japan) **Ai Sugiyama**	**6**	**6**
