= 2001 Toyota Princess Cup – Singles =

Singles
- 2001 Toyota Princess Cup

Final
- Champion: (Federal Republic of Yugoslavia) Jelena Dokic
- Runner-up: (Spain) Arantxa Sánchez Vicario
- Score: 6–4, 6–2

Details
- Draw: 28 (2WC/4Q/1LL)
- Seeds: 8

Events
Singles	Doubles
← 2000 ·	Toyota Princess Cup	· 2002 →

Serena Williams was the defending champion, but did not compete this year.

Jelena Dokic won the title by defeating Arantxa Sánchez Vicario 6–4, 6–2 in the final.

== Seeds ==
The first four seeds received a bye into the second round.

1. (Belgium) Kim Clijsters (semifinals)
2. (United States) ~~Monica Seles~~ (withdrew)
3. (Federal Republic of Yugoslavia) Jelena Dokic (champion)
4. (France) Sandrine Testud (quarterfinals)
5. (Spain) Arantxa Sánchez Vicario (final)
6. (Uzbekistan) Iroda Tulyaganova (first round)
7. (Thailand) Tamarine Tanasugarn (quarterfinals)
8. (Spain) Cristina Torrens Valero (first round)

== Draw ==
=== Key ===
- Q = Qualifier
- WC = Wild card
- LL = Lucky loser
- Alt = Alternate
- ITF = ITF entry
- PR = Protected ranking
- SR = Special ranking
- SE = Special exempt
- JE = Junior exempt
- JR = Junior Accelerator Programme entrant
- CO = College Accelerator Programme entrant
- NG = Next Gen Accelerator Program entrant
- w/o = Walkover
- r = Retired
- d = Defaulted

=== Finals ===
Semifinals
1	(Belgium) Kim Clijsters	5	4
3	(Federal Republic of Yugoslavia) Jelena Dokic	7	6
5	(Spain) Arantxa Sánchez Vicario	6	7
(Spain) Gala León García	3	5

Final
3	(Federal Republic of Yugoslavia) Jelena Dokic	6	6
5	(Spain) Arantxa Sánchez Vicario	4	2

=== Top half ===
First round
WC	(Japan) R Fujiwara	3	2
(Zimbabwe) C Black	6	6
(Germany) M Weingärtner	1	0
(Australia) N Pratt	6	6
(Italy) R Grande	6^{2}	4
7	(Thailand) T Tanasugarn	7^{7}	6
(Russia) L Krasnoroutskaya	6	6
(Argentina) M Díaz Oliva	4	0
(United States) M Tu	6	6
(Australia) R McQuillan	2	2
Q	(South Africa) L Huber	6	6
6	(Uzbekistan) I Tulyaganova	4	1

Second round
1	(Belgium) K Clijsters	6	6
(Zimbabwe) C Black	0	3
(Australia) N Pratt	3	6	2
7	(Thailand) T Tanasugarn	6	3	6
3	(Federal Republic of Yugoslavia) J Dokic	6	6
(Russia) L Krasnoroutskaya	4	4
(United States) M Tu	6^{6}	6	7
Q	(South Africa) L Huber	7^{8}	1	5

Quarterfinals
1	(Belgium) K Clijsters	6	6
7	(Thailand) T Tanasugarn	3	1
3	(Federal Republic of Yugoslavia) J Dokic	6	6
(United States) M Tu	2	2

Semifinals
1	(Belgium) K Clijsters	5	4
3	(Federal Republic of Yugoslavia) J Dokic	7	6

=== Bottom half ===
First round
5	(Spain) A Sánchez Vicario	6	6
(Australia) E Dominikovic	1	2
(Japan) S Asagoe	6	6^{2}	3
Q	(Croatia) S Talaja	4	7^{7}	6
Q	(Japan) S Hisamatsu	1	4
WC	(Japan) S Obata	6	6
8	(Spain) C Torrens Valero	1	2
(Japan) A Sugiyama	6	6
(South Africa) J Kruger	7	3	6
(Australia) A Molik	5	6	2
(Spain) G León García	6	2	6
LL	(Chinese Taipei) J Lee	4	6	2

Second round
5	(Spain) A Sánchez Vicario	6	6^{4}	7^{9}
Q	(Croatia) S Talaja	4	7^{7}	6^{7}
WC	(Japan) S Obata	2	7^{7}	1
4	(France) S Testud	6	6^{4}	6
(Japan) A Sugiyama	3	6	7^{7}
(South Africa) J Kruger	6	4	6^{4}
(Spain) G León García	6	3	6
Q	(Japan) M Saeki	2	6	2

Quarterfinals
5	(Spain) A Sánchez Vicario	6	1	7^{7}
4	(France) S Testud	3	6	6^{5}
(Japan) A Sugiyama	4	3
(Spain) G León García	6	6

Semifinals
5	(Spain) A Sánchez Vicario	6	7
(Spain) G León García	3	5
