= 2000 Mexx Benelux Open =

- Date: 15–21 May 2000
- Edition: 7th
- Category: Tier IV
- Draw: 32S / 16D
- Prize money: $140,000
- Surface: Clay / outdoor
- Location: Antwerp, Belgium

Champions

Singles
- (South Africa) Amanda Coetzer

Doubles
- (Belgium) Sabine Appelmans / (Belgium) Kim Clijsters
| ← 1999 · | Belgian Open | · 2001 → |

The 2000 Mexx Benelux Open was a women's tennis tournament played on outdoor clay courts in Antwerp, Belgium that was part of the Tier IV category of the 2000 WTA Tour. It was the seventh edition of the tournament and was held from 15 May until 21 May 2000. First-seeded Amanda Coetzer won the singles title and the accompanying $22,000 first-prize money.

== Finals ==
=== Singles ===
(South Africa) Amanda Coetzer defeated (Spain) Cristina Torrens Valero, 4–6, 6–2, 6–3

- It was Coetzer's first singles title of the year and the 7th of her career.

=== Doubles ===
(Belgium) Sabine Appelmans / (Belgium) Kim Clijsters defeated (United States) Jennifer Hopkins / (Slovenia) Petra Rampre, 6–1, 6–1
