= 1997 Toyota Princess Cup =

- Date: 15–21 September
- Edition: 1st
- Category: Tier II
- Draw: 28S / 16D
- Prize money: $450,000
- Surface: Hard / outdoor
- Location: Tokyo, Japan
- Venue: Ariake Coliseum

Champions

Singles
- (United States) Monica Seles

Doubles
- (United States) Monica Seles / (Japan) Ai Sugiyama
Toyota Princess Cup	· 1998 →

The 1997 Toyota Princess Cup was a women's tennis tournament played on outdoor hard courts at the Ariake Coliseum in Tokyo, Japan that was part of the Tier II category of the 1997 WTA Tour. It was the inaugural edition of the tournament and was held from 15 September through 21 September 1997. First-seeded Monica Seles won the singles title.

== Finals ==
=== Singles ===
(United States) Monica Seles defeated (Spain) Arantxa Sánchez Vicario 6–1, 3–6, 7–6^{(7–5)}

- It was Seles' 3rd singles title of the year and the 41st of her career.

=== Doubles ===
(United States) Monica Seles / (Japan) Ai Sugiyama defeated (France) Julie Halard-Decugis / (United States) Chanda Rubin 6–1, 6–0

- It was Seles' only doubles title of the year and the 5th of her career. It was Sugiyama's only doubles title of the year and the 4th of her career.
