= 1998 Toyota Princess Cup – Doubles =

Tennis championship

Doubles
- 1998 Toyota Princess Cup
- 1997 Champions: (United States) Monica Seles (Japan) Ai Sugiyama

Final
- Champions: (Russia) Anna Kournikova (United States) Monica Seles
- Runners-up: (United States) Mary Joe Fernández (Spain) Arantxa Sánchez Vicario
- Score: 6–4, 6–4

Events
Singles	Doubles
← 1997 ·	Toyota Princess Cup	· 1999 →

Monica Seles and Ai Sugiyama were the defending champions but only Seles competed that year with Anna Kournikova.

Kournikova and Seles won in the final 6–4, 6–4 against Mary Joe Fernández and Arantxa Sánchez Vicario.

== Seeds ==
Champion seeds are indicated in bold text while text in italics indicates the round in which those seeds were eliminated.

1. (United States) Lisa Raymond / (Australia) Rennae Stubbs (semifinals)
2. (France) Julie Halard-Decugis / (Croatia) Mirjana Lučić (quarterfinals)
3. (Australia) Kerry-Anne Guse / (South Korea) Sung-Hee Park (quarterfinals)
4. (Russia) **Anna Kournikova** / (United States) **Monica Seles (champions)**

== Draw ==
=== Key ===
- Q = Qualifier
- WC = Wild card
- LL = Lucky loser
- Alt = Alternate
- SE = Special exempt
- PR = Protected ranking
- ITF = ITF entry
- JE = Junior exempt
- w/o = Walkover
- r = Retired
- d = Defaulted
- SR = Special ranking

First round
1	(United States) **L Raymond** (Australia) **R Stubbs**	**7**	**7**
(Slovakia) J Husárová (Belgium) D Van Roost	5	5
(South Korea) E-H Kim (Thailand) B Sangaram	2	0
(Belarus) **O Barabanschikova** (Slovakia) **H Nagyová**	**6**	**6**
4	(Russia) **A Kournikova** (United States) **M Seles**	**6**	**6**
(South Africa) A Coetzer (Germany) A Huber	1	3
(Japan) R Hiraki (Japan) N Kijimuta	**7**	4	4
(Australia) **L McShea** (United States) **K Po**	6	**6**	**6**
(Chinese Taipei) J Lee (Chinese Taipei) S-T Wang	1	3
(Russia) **E Likhovtseva** (Thailand) **T Tanasugarn**	**6**	**6**
WC	(Japan) H Inoue (Japan) M Inoue	1	6
3	(Australia) **K-A Guse** (South Korea) **S-H Park**	**6**	**7**
(United States) **M J Fernández** (Spain) **A Sánchez Vicario**	**6**	**7**
Q	(United States) J Chi (United States) A Frazier	1	6
(Japan) M Saeki (Japan) Y Yoshida	2	3
2	(France) **J Halard-Decugis** (Croatia) **M Lučić**	**6**	**6**

Quarterfinals
1	(United States) **L Raymond** (Australia) **R Stubbs**	**6**	**6**
(Belarus) O Barabanschikova (Slovakia) H Nagyová	3	2
4	(Russia) **A Kournikova** (United States) **M Seles**	**6**	**6**
(Australia) L McShea (United States) K Po	2	0
(Russia) **E Likhovtseva** (Thailand) **T Tanasugarn**	**6**	**6**
3	(Australia) K-A Guse (South Korea) S-H Park	2	3
(United States) **M J Fernández** (Spain) **A Sánchez Vicario**	**w/o**
2	(France) J Halard-Decugis (Croatia) M Lučić

Semifinals
1	(United States) L Raymond (Australia) R Stubbs	6	3
4	(Russia) **A Kournikova** (United States) **M Seles**	**7**	**6**
(Russia) E Likhovtseva (Thailand) T Tanasugarn	4	1
(United States) **M J Fernández** (Spain) **A Sánchez Vicario**	**6**	**6**

Final
4	(Russia) **Anna Kournikova** (United States) **Monica Seles**	**6**	**6**
(United States) Mary Joe Fernández (Spain) Arantxa Sánchez Vicario	4	4
