= 2001 Toyota Princess Cup – Doubles =

Doubles
- 2001 Toyota Princess Cup

Final
- Champions: (Zimbabwe) Cara Black (South Africa) Liezel Huber
- Runners-up: (Belgium) Kim Clijsters (Japan) Ai Sugiyama
- Score: 6–1, 6–3

Details
- Draw: 16 (1WC/1Q)
- Seeds: 4

Events
Singles	Doubles
← 2000 ·	Toyota Princess Cup	· 2002 →

Julie Halard-Decugis and Ai Sugiyama were the defending champions, but Halard-Decugis retired from professional tennis at the end of the 2000 season.

Sugiyama teamed up with Kim Clijsters and lost in the final to Cara Black and Liezel Huber, with a score of 6–1, 6–3. It was the first ever participation for Black and Huber as a team, as well as their first title.

== Seeds ==
1. (Belgium) Kim Clijsters / (Japan) Ai Sugiyama (final)
2. (Zimbabwe) Cara Black / (South Africa) Liezel Huber (champions)
3. (France) Alexandra Fusai / (Italy) Rita Grande (semifinals)
4. (United States) Martina Navratilova / (Spain) Arantxa Sánchez Vicario (quarterfinals)

== Draw ==
=== Key ===
- Q = Qualifier
- WC = Wild card
- LL = Lucky loser
- Alt = Alternate
- SE = Special exempt
- PR = Protected ranking
- ITF = ITF entry
- JE = Junior exempt
- w/o = Walkover
- r = Retired
- d = Defaulted
- SR = Special ranking

=== Draw ===
First round
1	(Belgium) K Clijsters (Japan) A Sugiyama	6	6
(Argentina) M Díaz Oliva (Spain) C Torrens Valero	2	0
WC	(Japan) A Morigami (Japan) M Saeki	1	7^{7}	6
(Japan) S Asagoe (Japan) Y Yoshida	6	6^{4}	4
3	(France) A Fusai (Italy) R Grande	7	6
(Australia) A Molik (Australia) N Pratt	5	2
(Australia) E Dominikovic (Germany) M Weingärtner	3	6	6
(Russia) L Krasnoroutskaya (United States) M Tu	6	2	3
(Chinese Taipei) J Lee (Australia) R McQuillan	6^{3}	7	7
Q	(Japan) R Fujiwara (South Korea) M-r Jeon	7^{7}	5	5
(Japan) R Hiraki (Uzbekistan) I Tulyaganova	5	7	1
4	(United States) M Navratilova (Spain) A Sánchez Vicario	7	5	6
(Paraguay) R de los Ríos (South Africa) J Kruger	2	6	7
(United States) E deLone (Australia) A Ellwood	6	3	5
(Japan) H Inoue (Japan) M Inoue	4	1
2	(Zimbabwe) C Black (South Africa) L Huber	6	6

Quarterfinals
1	(Belgium) K Clijsters (Japan) A Sugiyama	6	6
WC	(Japan) A Morigami (Japan) M Saeki	1	4
3	(France) A Fusai (Italy) R Grande	6	7
(Australia) E Dominikovic (Germany) M Weingärtner	2	5
(Chinese Taipei) J Lee (Australia) R McQuillan	4	6	7^{7}
4	(United States) M Navratilova (Spain) A Sánchez Vicario	6	3	6^{4}
(Paraguay) R de los Ríos (South Africa) J Kruger	0	4
2	(Zimbabwe) C Black (South Africa) L Huber	6	6

Semifinals
1	(Belgium) K Clijsters (Japan) A Sugiyama	6	4	6
3	(France) A Fusai (Italy) R Grande	4	6	3
(Chinese Taipei) J Lee (Australia) R McQuillan	1	3
2	(Zimbabwe) C Black (South Africa) L Huber	6	6

Final
1	(Belgium) K Clijsters (Japan) A Sugiyama	1	3
2	(Zimbabwe) C Black (South Africa) L Huber	6	6
