= 2002 Toyota Princess Cup – Doubles =

Doubles
- 2002 Toyota Princess Cup

Final
- Champions: (Russia) Svetlana Kuznetsova (Spain) Arantxa Sánchez Vicario
- Runners-up: (Hungary) Petra Mandula (Austria) Patricia Wartusch
- Score: 6–2, 6–4

Details
- Draw: 16 (2WC/1Q)
- Seeds: 4

Events
Singles	Doubles
← 2001 ·	Toyota Princess Cup

Cara Black and Liezel Huber were the defending champions, but Huber did not compete this year. Black teamed up with Elena Likhovtseva and lost in semifinals to tournament winners Svetlana Kuznetsova and Arantxa Sánchez Vicario.

Kuznetsova and Sánchez Vicario defeated Petra Mandula and Patricia Wartusch 6–2, 6–4 in the final.

== Seeds ==
1. (Zimbabwe) Cara Black / (Russia) Elena Likhovtseva (semifinals)
2. (Belgium) Kim Clijsters / (Federal Republic of Yugoslavia) Jelena Dokic (first round)
3. (Spain) Conchita Martínez / (Australia) Nicole Pratt (first round)
4. (Chinese Taipei) Janet Lee / (Indonesia) Wynne Prakusya (semifinals)

== Draw ==
=== Key ===
- Q = Qualifier
- WC = Wild card
- LL = Lucky loser
- Alt = Alternate
- SE = Special exempt
- PR = Protected ranking
- ITF = ITF entry
- JE = Junior exempt
- w/o = Walkover
- r = Retired
- d = Defaulted
- SR = Special ranking

=== Draw ===
First round
1	(Zimbabwe) C Black (Russia) E Likhovtseva	6
WC	(Japan) K Date (Japan) M Saeki	3	r
(Japan) A Sugiyama (Belarus) N Zvereva	6	6
(Australia) E Dominikovic (United States) K Schlukebir	1	4
3	(Spain) C Martínez (Australia) N Pratt	1	6	3
WC	(United States) M Navratilova (United States) S Williams	6	4	6
Q	(Japan) R Hiraki (Croatia) J Kostanić	6	1	2
(Russia) S Kuznetsova (Spain) A Sánchez Vicario	3	6	6
(Japan) S Asagoe (Indonesia) A Widjaja	4	4
(United States) C Morariu (United States) K Po-Messerli	6	6
(Switzerland) E Gagliardi (Slovakia) H Nagyová	3	4
4	(Chinese Taipei) J Lee (Indonesia) W Prakusya	6	6
(Argentina) C Fernández (Argentina) P Tarabini	6	2	5
(South Africa) N de Villiers (Australia) T Musgrave	4	6	7
(Hungary) P Mandula (Austria) P Wartusch	7	6
2	(Belgium) K Clijsters (Federal Republic of Yugoslavia) J Dokic	5	4

Quarterfinals
1	(Zimbabwe) C Black (Russia) E Likhovtseva	6	6
(Japan) A Sugiyama (Belarus) N Zvereva	4	2
WC	(United States) M Navratilova (United States) S Williams	5	4
(Russia) S Kuznetsova (Spain) A Sánchez Vicario	7	6
(United States) C Morariu (United States) K Po-Messerli	6^{5}	4
4	(Chinese Taipei) J Lee (Indonesia) W Prakusya	7^{7}	6
(South Africa) N de Villiers (Australia) T Musgrave	4	3
(Hungary) P Mandula (Austria) P Wartusch	6	6

Semifinals
1	(Zimbabwe) C Black (Russia) E Likhovtseva	6^{4}	6	4
(Russia) S Kuznetsova (Spain) A Sánchez Vicario	7^{7}	4	6
4	(Chinese Taipei) J Lee (Indonesia) W Prakusya	7^{7}	3	4
(Hungary) P Mandula (Austria) P Wartusch	6^{4}	6	6

Final
(Russia) S Kuznetsova (Spain) A Sánchez Vicario	6	6
(Hungary) P Mandula (Austria) P Wartusch	2	4
