= 2000 Toyota Princess Cup =

- Date: 2–8 October
- Edition: 4th
- Category: Tier II
- Draw: 28S / 16D
- Prize money: $535,000
- Surface: Hard / outdoor
- Location: Tokyo, Japan

Champions

Singles
- (United States) Serena Williams

Doubles
- (France) Julie Halard-Decugis / (Japan) Ai Sugiyama
← 1999 ·	Toyota Princess Cup	· 2001 →

The 2000 Toyota Princess Cup was a women's tennis tournament played on outdoor hard courts in Tokyo, Japan. It was part of Tier II of the 2000 WTA Tour. It was the fourth edition of the tournament and was held from 2 October through 8 October 2000. Second-seeded Serena Williams won the singles title and earned $87,000 first-prize money.

== Finals ==
=== Singles ===
(United States) Serena Williams defeated (France) Julie Halard-Decugis, 7–5, 6–1

- This was Williams' 3rd singles title of the year and the 8th of her career.

=== Doubles ===
(France) Julie Halard-Decugis / (Japan) Ai Sugiyama defeated (Japan) Nana Miyagi / (Argentina) Paola Suárez, 6–0, 6–2
