= 1999 Flanders Women's Open =

- Date: 10–16 May
- Edition: 6th
- Category: Tier IV
- Draw: 32S / 16D
- Prize money: $112,500
- Surface: Clay / outdoor
- Location: Antwerp, Belgium

Champions

Singles
- (Belgium) Justine Henin

Doubles
- (Italy) Laura Golarsa / (Slovenia) Katarina Srebotnik
← 1993 ·	Belgian Open	· 2000 →

The 1999 Flanders Women's Open was a women's tennis tournament played on outdoor clay courts in Antwerp, Belgium that was part of the Tier IV category of the 1999 WTA Tour. It was the sixth edition of the tournament and was held from 10 May until 16 May 1999. Unseeded Justine Henin, who entered on a wildcard, won the singles title and the accompanying $16,000 first-prize money.

== Finals ==
=== Singles ===
(Belgium) Justine Henin defeated (France) Sarah Pitkowski, 6–1, 6–2

- This was future World No. 1 Henin's first WTA title.

=== Doubles ===
(Italy) Laura Golarsa / (Slovenia) Katarina Srebotnik defeated (Australia) Louise Pleming / (United States) Meghann Shaughnessy, 6–4, 6–2

== Entrants ==
=== Seeds ===
Country	Player	Rank	Seed
FRA	Sarah Pitkowski	35	1
LUX	Anne Kremer	40	2
NED	Miriam Oremans	48	3
FRA	Alexia Dechaume-Balleret	52	4
ITA	Rita Grande	53	5
FRA	Amélie Cocheteux	55	6
PUR	Kristina Brandi	58	7
USA	Jane Chi	64	8

=== Other entrants ===
The following players received wildcards into the singles main draw:

- (Belgium) Justine Henin
- (Belgium) Laurence Courtois

The following players received wildcards into the doubles main draw:

- (Belgium) Justine Henin / (Luxembourg) Anne Kremer

The following players received entry from the singles qualifying draw:

- (Austria) Marion Maruska
- (Chinese Taipei) Janet Lee
- (Spain) Gisela Riera
- (Bulgaria) Lubomira Bacheva

The following players received entry as lucky losers:

- (United States) Meilen Tu
- (Belgium) Kim Clijsters

The following players received entry from the doubles qualifying draw:

- (United States) Jane Chi / (United States) Meilen Tu

The following players received entry as lucky losers:

- (Belgium) Kim Clijsters / (India) Nirupama Vaidyanathan
