= 1978 Belgian International Championships =

- Date: 12–18 June
- Edition: 7th
- Category: Grand Prix
- Draw: 32S / 16D
- Prize money: $50,000
- Surface: Clay / outdoor
- Location: Brussels, Belgium
- Venue: Leopold Club

Champions

Singles
- (West Germany) Werner Zirngibl

Doubles
- (Italy) Antonio Zugarelli / (France) Jean-Louis Haillet
← 1977 ·	Belgian International Championships	· 1979 →

The 1978 Belgian International Championships was a men's tennis tournament staged at the Leopold Club in Brussels, Belgium that was part of the Grand Prix circuit. The tournament was played on outdoor clay courts and was held from 12 June until 18 June 1978. It was the seventh edition of the tournament and unseeded Werner Zirngibl, who entered the competition as a qualifier, won the singles title.

== Finals ==
=== Singles ===
(West Germany) Werner Zirngibl defeated (Argentina) Ricardo Cano 1–6, 6–3, 6–4, 6–3

- It was Zirngib's only singles title of his career.

=== Doubles ===
(Italy) Antonio Zugarelli / (France) Jean-Louis Haillet defeated (New Zealand) Onny Parun / (Czechoslovakia) Vladimír Zedník 6–3, 4–6, 7–5
