= 2001 TennisCup Vlaanderen =

- Date: 14–20 May
- Edition: 8th
- Category: Tier V
- Draw: 32S / 16D
- Prize money: $110,000
- Surface: Clay / outdoor
- Location: Antwerp, Belgium

Champions

Singles
- (Germany) Barbara Rittner

Doubles
- (Belgium) Els Callens / (Spain) Virginia Ruano Pascual
← 2000 ·	Belgian Open	· 2002 →

The 2001 TennisCup Vlaanderen was a women's tennis tournament played on outdoor clay courts in Antwerp, Belgium that was part of the Tier V category of the 2001 WTA Tour. It was the eighth edition of the tournament and was held from 14 May until 20 May 2001. Fifth-seeded Barbara Rittner won the singles title and the accompanying $16,000 first-prize money.

== Finals ==
=== Singles ===
(Germany) Barbara Rittner defeated (Czech Republic) Klára Koukalová, 6–3, 6–2

- It was Rittner's 1st singles title of the year and the 2nd and last of her career.

=== Doubles ===
(Belgium) Els Callens / (Spain) Virginia Ruano Pascual defeated (Netherlands) Kristie Boogert / (Netherlands) Miriam Oremans, 6–3, 3–6, 6–4
