= 1972 Belgian Open Championships =

- Date: 8–14 May
- Edition: 6th
- Category: Grand Prix (Group C)
- Draw: 32S / 16D
- Prize money: $25,000
- Surface: Clay / outdoor
- Location: Brussels, Belgium
- Venue: Leopold Club

Champions

Singles
- (Spain) Manuel Orantes

Doubles
- (Spain) Manuel Orantes / (Spain) Juan Gisbert Sr.
← 1971 ·	Belgian Open Championships	· 1977 →

The 1972 Belgian Open Championships was a men's tennis tournament staged at the Leopold Club in Brussels, Belgium that was part of the Grand Prix circuit and categorized as a Group C event. The tournament was played on outdoor clay courts and was held from 8 May until 4 May 1972. It was the sixth edition of the tournament and Manuel Orantes won the singles title.

== Finals ==
=== Singles ===
(Spain) Manuel Orantes defeated (Spain) Andrés Gimeno 6–4, 6–1, 2–6, 7–5

- It was Orantes' 3rd singles title of the year and the 8th of his career in the Open Era.

=== Doubles ===
(Spain) Manuel Orantes / (Spain) Juan Gisbert Sr. and (Chile) Patricio Cornejo / (Chile) Jaime Fillol 9–7, 6–3
