= 1977 Belgian International Championships =

- Date: 6–12 June
- Edition: 6th
- Category: Grand Prix (Two star)
- Draw: 48S / 24D
- Prize money: $75,000
- Surface: Clay / outdoor
- Location: Brussels, Belgium
- Venue: Leopold Club

Champions

Singles
- (United States) Harold Solomon

Doubles
- (Socialist Federal Republic of Yugoslavia) Željko Franulović / (Socialist Federal Republic of Yugoslavia) Nikola Pilić (Czechoslovakia) František Pála / (Hungary) Balázs Taróczy
← 1972 ·	Belgian International Championships	· 1978 →

The 1977 Belgian International Championships was a men's tennis tournament staged at the Leopold Club in Brussels, Belgium that was part of the Grand Prix circuit and categorized as a Two star event. The tournament was played on outdoor clay courts and was held from 6 June until 12 June 1977. It was the sixth edition of the tournament and first-seeded Harold Solomon won the singles title.

== Finals ==
=== Singles ===
(United States) Harold Solomon defeated (West Germany) Karl Meiler 7–5, 3–6, 2–6, 6–3, 6–4

- It was Solomon's 1st singles title of the year and the 11th of his career.

=== Doubles ===
(Socialist Federal Republic of Yugoslavia) Željko Franulović / (Socialist Federal Republic of Yugoslavia) Nikola Pilić and (Czechoslovakia) František Pála / (Hungary) Balázs Taróczy final not played, title shared
