= 2002 Toyota Princess Cup =

- Date: 16–22 September
- Edition: 6th
- Category: Tier II
- Draw: 28S / 16D
- Prize money: $585,000
- Surface: Hard / outdoor
- Location: Tokyo, Japan
- Venue: Ariake Colosseum

Champions

Singles
- (United States) Serena Williams

Doubles
- (Russia) Svetlana Kuznetsova (Spain) Arantxa Sánchez Vicario
- Toyota Princess Cup

The 2002 Toyota Princess Cup was a women's tennis tournament played on outdoor hard courts at the Ariake Colosseum in Tokyo, Japan. It was part of Tier II of the 2002 WTA Tour. It was the sixth and last edition of the tournament and was held from 16 September through 22 September 2002. First-seeded Serena Williams won the singles title and earned $93,000 first-prize money.

== Finals ==
=== Singles ===
(United States) Serena Williams defeated (Belgium) Kim Clijsters, 2–6, 6–3, 6–3

- This was William' 7th singles title of the year and the 18th of her career.

=== Doubles ===
(Russia) Svetlana Kuznetsova / (Spain) Arantxa Sánchez Vicario defeated (Hungary) Petra Mandula / (Austria) Patricia Wartusch, 6–2, 6–4
