= 1980 Belgian International Championships =

Tennis tournament

- Date: 9–15 June
- Edition: 9th
- Category: Grand Prix
- Draw: 32S / 16D
- Prize money: $50,000
- Surface: Clay / outdoor
- Location: Brussels, Belgium
- Venue: Leopold Club

Champions

Singles
- (Australia) Peter McNamara

Doubles
- (Belgium) Thierry Stevaux / (United States) Steve Krulevitz
← 1979 ·	Belgian International Championships	· 1981 →

The 1980 Belgian International Championships was a men's tennis tournament staged at the Leopold Club in Brussels, Belgium that was part of the Grand Prix circuit. The tournament was played on outdoor clay courts and was held from 9 June until 15 June 1980. It was the ninth edition of the tournament and third-seeded Peter McNamara won the singles title.

== Finals ==
=== Singles ===
(Australia) Peter McNamara defeated (Hungary) Balázs Taróczy 7–6, 6–3, 6–0

- It was McNamara's 1st singles title of the year and the 2nd of his career.

=== Doubles ===
(Belgium) Thierry Stevaux / (United States) Steve Krulevitz defeated (United States) Eric Fromm / (United States) Cary Leeds 6–3, 7–5
