= 1981 Belgian International Championships =

- Date: 8–14 June
- Edition: 10th
- Category: Grand Prix
- Draw: 32S / 16D
- Prize money: $50,000
- Surface: Clay / outdoor
- Location: Brussels, Belgium
- Venue: Leopold Club

Champions

Singles
- (Socialist Federal Republic of Yugoslavia) Marko Ostoja

Doubles
- (Argentina) Ricardo Cano / (Venezuela) Andrés Gómez
← 1980 ·	Belgian International Championships

The 1981 Belgian International Championships was a men's tennis tournament staged at the Leopold Club in Brussels, Belgium that was part of the Grand Prix circuit. The tournament was played on outdoor clay courts and was held from 8 June until 14 June 1981. It was the tenth and last edition of the tournament and third-seeded Marko Ostoja won the singles title.

== Finals ==
=== Singles ===
(Socialist Federal Republic of Yugoslavia) Marko Ostoja defeated (Ecuador) Ricardo Ycaza 4–6, 6–4, 7–5

- It was Ostoja's only singles title of his career.

=== Doubles ===
(Argentina) Ricardo Cano / (Venezuela) Andrés Gómez defeated (Brazil) Carlos Kirmayr / (Brazil) Cássio Motta 6–2, 6–2
