= 1971 Belgian Open Championships =

- Date: 17–23 May
- Edition: 5th
- Category: Grand Prix (Group B)
- Draw: 32S / 16D
- Prize money: $25,000
- Surface: Clay / outdoor
- Location: Brussels, Belgium
- Venue: Leopold Club

Champions

Singles
- (South Africa) Cliff Drysdale

Doubles
- (Netherlands) Tom Okker / (United States) Marty Riessen (Romania) Ilie Năstase / (Romania) Ion Țiriac
← 1970 ·	Belgian Open Championships	· 1972 →

The 1971 Belgian Open Championships was a men's tennis tournament staged at the Leopold Club in Brussels, Belgium that was part of the Grand Prix circuit and categorized as a Group B event. The tournament was played on outdoor clay courts and was held from 17 May until 23 May 1971. It was the fifth edition of the tournament and Cliff Drysdale won the singles title.

== Finals ==
=== Singles ===
(South Africa) Cliff Drysdale defeated (Romania) Ilie Năstase 6–0, 6–1, 7–5

- It was Drysdale's 2nd singles title of the year and the 3rd of his career in the Open Era.

=== Doubles ===
(United States) Marty Riessen / (Netherlands) Tom Okker and (Romania) Ilie Năstase / (Romania) Ion Țiriac divided
