= 1979 Belgian International Championships =

- Date: 11–17 June
- Edition: 8th
- Category: Grand Prix
- Draw: 32S / 16D
- Prize money: $50,000
- Surface: Clay / outdoor
- Location: Brussels, Belgium
- Venue: Leopold Club

Champions

Singles
- (Hungary) Balázs Taróczy

Doubles
- (United States) Billy Martin / (Australia) Peter McNamara
← 1978 ·	Belgian International Championships	· 1980 →

The 1979 Belgian International Championships was a men's tennis tournament staged at the Leopold Club in Brussels, Belgium that was part of the Grand Prix circuit. The tournament was played on outdoor clay courts and was held from 11 June until 17 June 1979. It was the eighth edition of the tournament and second-seeded Balázs Taróczy won the singles title.

== Finals ==
=== Singles ===
(Hungary) Balázs Taróczy defeated (Czechoslovakia) Ivan Lendl 6–1, 1–6, 6–3

- It was Taróczy's 1st singles title of the year and the 5th of his career.

=== Doubles ===
(United States) Billy Martin / (Australia) Peter McNamara defeated (Brazil) Carlos Kirmayr / (Hungary) Balázs Taróczy 5–7, 7–5, 6–4
