= 2001 Toyota Princess Cup =

- Date: 17–23 September
- Edition: 5th
- Category: Tier II
- Draw: 28S / 16D
- Prize money: $565,000
- Surface: Hard / outdoor
- Location: Tokyo, Japan
- Venue: Ariake Colosseum

Champions

Singles
- (Federal Republic of Yugoslavia) Jelena Dokić

Doubles
- (Zimbabwe) Cara Black / (South Africa) Liezel Huber
- Toyota Princess Cup

The 2001 Toyota Princess Cup was a women's tennis tournament played on outdoor hard courts at the Ariake Colosseum in Tokyo, Japan. It was part of Tier II of the 2001 WTA Tour. It was the fifth edition of the tournament and was held from 17 September through 23 September 2001.Third-seeded Jelena Dokić won the singles title and earned $90,000 first-prize money.

== Finals ==
=== Singles ===
(Federal Republic of Yugoslavia) Jelena Dokić defeated (Spain) Arantxa Sánchez Vicario, 6–4, 6–2

- This was Dokić' 2nd singles title of the year and of her career.

=== Doubles ===
(Zimbabwe) Cara Black / (South Africa) Liezel Huber defeated (Belgium) Kim Clijsters / (Japan) Ai Sugiyama, 6–1, 6–3
