= 1999 Flanders Women's Open – Singles =

Singles
- 1999 Belgian Open

Final
- Champion: (Belgium) Justine Henin
- Runner-up: (France) Sarah Pitkowski
- Score: 6–1, 6–2

Details
- Draw: 32
- Seeds: 8

Events
Singles	Doubles
← 1998 ·	Belgian Open	· 2000 →

The 1999 Belgian Open singles was the singles event of the sixth edition of the Belgian Open; a WTA Tier IV tournament and one of the most prestigious women's tennis tournament held in Belgium. The tournament had not occurred since 1993, where it was won by Radka Bobková. She did not compete this year.

Wildcard and World No. 178 Justine Henin won her first WTA title, defeating first seed Sarah Pitkowski in the final, 6–1, 6–2. This was also the first WTA tour tournament that Henin competed in, making her the fifth woman ever to win their debut WTA event.

== Seeds ==
1. (France) Sarah Pitkowski (final)
2. (Luxembourg) Anne Kremer (second round)
3. (Netherlands) Miriam Oremans (first round)
4. (France) Alexia Dechaume-Balleret (first round)
5. (Italy) Rita Grande (first round, retired)
6. (France) Amélie Cocheteux (second round)
7. (Puerto Rico) Kristina Brandi (first round)
8. (United States) Jane Chi (second round)

== Draw ==
=== Key ===
- Q = Qualifier
- WC = Wild card
- LL = Lucky loser
- Alt = Alternate
- SE = Special exempt
- PR = Protected ranking
- ITF = ITF entry
- JE = Junior exempt
- w/o = Walkover
- r = Retired
- d = Defaulted
- SR = Special ranking

=== Finals ===
Semifinals
1	(France) Sarah Pitkowski	6	6
(Belgium) Els Callens	4	4
WC	(Belgium) Justine Henin	7	6
(Netherlands) Kristie Boogert	5	4

Final
1	(France) Sarah Pitkowski	1	2
WC	(Belgium) Justine Henin	6	6

=== Top half ===
First round
1	(France) S Pitkowski	6	6
LL	(United States) M Tu	3	1
Q	(Austria) M Maruska	3	4
(Hungary) R Kuti-Kis	6	6
LL	(Belgium) K Clijsters	6	6
(Japan) M Saeki	2	1
(Germany) E Wagner	6	3
5	(Italy) R Grande	3	1	r
4	(France) A Dechaume-Balleret	1	6	1
(Belgium) E Callens	6	3	6
(Venezuela) M Vento	6	1	5
(Bulgaria) M Maleeva	1	6	7
(Sweden) Å Carlsson	6	6
Q	(Chinese Taipei) J Lee	2	4
Q	(Spain) G Riera	5	7^{8}	4
8	(United States) J Chi	7	6^{6}	6

Second round
1	(France) S Pitkowski	6	6
(Hungary) R Kuti-Kis	2	1
LL	(Belgium) K Clijsters	6	6
(Germany) E Wagner	2	2
(Belgium) E Callens	2	6	6
(Bulgaria) M Maleeva	6	3	2
(Sweden) Å Carlsson	2	6	6
8	(United States) J Chi	6	2	4

Quarterfinals
1	(France) S Pitkowski	3	7	6
LL	(Belgium) K Clijsters	6	5	1
(Belgium) E Callens	6	6
(Sweden) Å Carlsson	3	1

Semifinals
1	(France) S Pitkowski	6	6
(Belgium) E Callens	4	4

=== Bottom half ===
First round
6	(France) A Cocheteux	6	6
(United States) M Shaughnessy	4	4
Q	(Bulgaria) L Bacheva	2	1
WC	(Belgium) J Henin	6	6
(Romania) C Cristea	2	0
WC	(Belgium) L Courtois	6	6
(Belarus) O Barabanschikova	6^{4}	6	6
3	(Netherlands) M Oremans	7^{7}	1	1
7	(Puerto Rico) K Brandi	1	2	r
(Slovenia) K Srebotnik	6	3
(Belgium) S Appelmans	6	6
(Italy) L Golarsa	4	2
(Netherlands) K Boogert	7^{7}	7^{7}
(Netherlands) S Noorlander	6^{4}	6^{4}
(Greece) C Papadáki	6^{6}	7	4
2	(Luxembourg) A Kremer	7^{8}	5	6

Second round
6	(France) A Cocheteux	7	3	1
WC	(Belgium) J Henin	5	6	6
WC	(Belgium) L Courtois	2	2
(Belarus) O Barabanschikova	6	6
(Slovenia) K Srebotnik	3	2
(Belgium) S Appelmans	6	6
(Netherlands) K Boogert	6	7^{7}
2	(Luxembourg) A Kremer	2	6^{5}

Quarterfinals
WC	(Belgium) J Henin	7^{7}	6
(Belarus) O Barabanschikova	6^{3}	2
(Belgium) S Appelmans	7^{8}	6^{2}	6^{0}
(Netherlands) K Boogert	6^{6}	7^{7}	7^{7}

Semifinals
WC	(Belgium) J Henin	7	6
(Netherlands) K Boogert	5	4

== Qualifying ==
=== Seeds ===
1. (Chinese Taipei) Janet Lee (qualifier)
2. (Slovakia) Katarína Studeníková (second round)
3. (Bulgaria) Lubomira Bacheva (qualifier)
4. (United States) Meilen Tu (qualifying competition, lucky loser)
5. (United States) Jill Craybas (first round)
6. (Austria) Marion Maruska (qualifier)
7. (Belgium) Patty Van Acker (second round)
8. (Spain) Gisela Riera (qualifier)

=== Qualifiers ===
1. (Chinese Taipei) Janet Lee
2. (Bulgaria) Lubomira Bacheva
3. (Austria) Marion Maruska
4. (Spain) Gisela Riera

=== Lucky losers ===
1. (Belgium) Kim Clijsters
2. (United States) Meilen Tu

== Qualifying draw ==
=== Key ===
- Q = Qualifier
- WC = Wild card
- LL = Lucky loser
- Alt = Alternate
- SE = Special exempt
- PR = Protected ranking
- ITF = ITF entry
- JE = Junior exempt
- w/o = Walkover
- r = Retired
- d = Defaulted
- SR = Special ranking

=== First qualifier ===
First round
1	(Chinese Taipei) Janet Lee	w/o
(Czech Republic) Eva Martincová
(Poland) Katarzyna Strączy	2	7	6
(Belgium) Evy Last	6	5	4
WC	(Belgium) Stephanie Devillé	2	2
(Belgium) Kim Clijsters	6	6
(Czech Republic) Milena Nekvapilová	4	1
7	(Belgium) Patty Van Acker	6	6

Second round
1	(Chinese Taipei) Janet Lee	6	6
(Poland) Katarzyna Strączy	4	1
(Belgium) Kim Clijsters	6	6
7	(Belgium) Patty Van Acker	0	4

Qualifying competition
1	(Chinese Taipei) Janet Lee	3	7	6
(Belgium) Kim Clijsters	6	5	4

=== Second qualifier ===
First round
3	(Bulgaria) Lubomira Bacheva	6	6
(United States) Katie Schlukebir	1	0
(India) Nirupama Vaidyanathan	3	6	3
(Spain) Rosa María Andrés Rodríguez	6	4	6
(United Kingdom) Monica Massarella	0	0
(Paraguay) Larissa Schaerer	6	6
(Czech Republic) Hana Šromová	6	2	6
5	(United States) Jill Craybas	3	6	2

Second round
3	(Bulgaria) Lubomira Bacheva	6	6
(Spain) Rosa María Andrés Rodríguez	1	3
(Paraguay) Larissa Schaerer	2	7	6^{6}
(Czech Republic) Hana Šromová	6	5	7^{8}

Qualifying competition
3	(Bulgaria) Lubomira Bacheva	6	7
(Czech Republic) Hana Šromová	4	5

=== Third qualifier ===
First round
6	(Austria) Marion Maruska	6	6
(Germany) Susi Lohrmann	2	4
(Brazil) Vanessa Menga	4	2
(Italy) Antonella Serra Zanetti	6	6
(Australia) Louise Pleming	6	7
WC	(Belgium) Evy de Mesmaecker	3	5
(Slovenia) Tina Pisnik
4	(United States) Meilen Tu	w/o

Second round
6	(Austria) Marion Maruska	6	7^{7}
(Italy) Antonella Serra Zanetti	3	6^{4}
(Australia) Louise Pleming	2	0
4	(United States) Meilen Tu	6	6

Qualifying competition
6	(Austria) Marion Maruska	1	6	6
4	(United States) Meilen Tu	6	2	4

=== Fourth qualifier ===
First round
8	(Spain) Gisela Riera	6	6
(Germany) Heike Thoms	2	2
(Kazakhstan) Irina Selyutina
(Germany) Christiane Hoppmann	w/o
(Germany) Camilla Kremer	6	6
WC	(Germany) Denise Hofer	3	1
WC	(Germany) Adriana Jerabek	4	1
2	(Slovakia) Katarína Studeníková	6	6

Second round
8	(Spain) Gisela Riera	7	6
(Germany) Christiane Hoppmann	5	4
(Germany) Camilla Kremer	6	6
2	(Slovakia) Katarína Studeníková	2	2

Qualifying competition
8	(Spain) Gisela Riera	6	6
(Germany) Camilla Kremer	3	1
