= Monique Viele =

American tennis player

- Country (sports): United States
- Born: October 6, 1984 (age 42)
- Turned pro: 1999
- Retired: 2002
- Plays: Right-handed (two-handed backhand)

Singles
- Career record: 12–23
- Highest ranking: No. 817 (October 9, 2000)

Monique Viele (born October 6, 1984) is a retired tennis player from the United States.

In her singles career, Viele was ranked as high as 817 (October 9, 2000). Viele began her professional career on September 22, 1999, when she lost to Jane Chi 6–3, 6–1 in the 1999 Tokyo Princess Cup. Before the beginning her professional career, Viele threatened to challenge the Capriati Rule Age Eligibility Rule in court, which limited female tennis players from turning pro before the age of 15. However, the Women's Tennis Association amended its rules on age eligibility in order to allow 14 year old players to play at one match. Thus at age 14 years 11 months in 1999, Viele played her first WTA match. Viele's last tennis match came on September 17, 2001.

Viele originally was managed by I.M.G. from 1993 to 1999 and was subsequently managed by Donald Trump's group, T Management, and subsequently Trump himself from 1999 to 2002. She also spent time training at club grounds of Mar-a-Lago. With Trump's guidance and representation, Viele signed endorsement deals with Fila and Yonex.

Viele has been in several media publications, including a chapter about her career in Rick Macci's Macci Magic, Sports Illustrated, a Discovery Channel special titled The Ultimate Athlete, and an L’Equipe article
