= 1998 Toyota Princess Cup =

- Date: 21–27 September
- Edition: 2nd
- Category: Tier II
- Draw: 28S / 16D
- Prize money: $450,000
- Surface: Hard / outdoor
- Location: Tokyo, Japan
- Venue: Ariake Coliseum

Champions

Singles
- (United States) Monica Seles

Doubles
- (Russia) Anna Kournikova / (United States) Monica Seles
- Toyota Princess Cup

The 1998 Toyota Princess Cup was a women's tennis tournament played on outdoor hard courts at the Ariake Coliseum in Tokyo, Japan that was part of Tier II of the 1998 WTA Tour. It was the second edition of the tournament and was held from 21 September through 27 September 1998. Second-seeded Monica Seles won the singles title and earned $79,000 first-prize money.

== Finals ==
=== Singles ===
(United States) Monica Seles defeated (Spain) Arantxa Sánchez Vicario 4–6, 6–3, 6–4

- It was Seles' 2nd singles title of the year and the 43rd of her career.

=== doubles ===
(Russia) Anna Kournikova / (United States) Monica Seles defeated (United States) Mary Joe Fernández / (Spain) Arantxa Sánchez Vicario 6–4, 6–4

- It was Kournikova's only title of the year and the 1st of her career. It was Seles' 3rd title of the year and the 49th of her career.
