= Tracy Almeda-Singian =

American tennis player

- Full name: Jennifer Tracy; Almeda-Singian
- Country (sports): United States
- Born: October 6, 1979 (age 47) New York City, U.S.
- Plays: Right-handed
- Prize money: $118,746

Singles
- Career record: 104–156
- Highest ranking: No. 159 (August 7, 2000)

Grand Slam singles results
- US Open: 1R (1999, 2000)

Doubles
- Career record: 21–50
- Highest ranking: No. 218 (July 19, 1999)

Jennifer Tracy Almeda-Singian (born October 6, 1979) is a former professional tennis player from the United States.

== Biography ==
Almeda-Singian was born in New York City and is of Filipino descent. At the age of four she moved to New Jersey where she first started to play tennis. Later training in Orlando, she made her WTA Tour debut in the main doubles draw of Indian Wells in 1996, partnering Alexandra Stevenson.

She competed in the qualifying draw of all four grand slam tournaments during her career, once successfully, at the 1999 US Open. Her only other grand slam main draw appearance came as a wildcard at the 2000 US Open and she was beaten in the first round by sixth seed Monica Seles.

On the WTA Tour her best performances were in 2000, when she made the second round of tournaments in Amelia Island and Antwerp.

== ITF finals ==
$50,000 tournaments
$25,000 tournaments
$10,000 tournaments

=== Singles (1–2) ===
Result	No.	Date	Tournament	Surface	Opponent	Score
Win	1.	15 June 1997	Bossonnens, Switzerland	Clay	(Switzerland) Caecilia Charbonnier	6–4, 6–4
Loss	1.	24 May 1998	Spartanburg, United States	Clay	(Greece) Christína Papadáki	3–6, 0–6
Loss	2.	23 July 2000	Mahwah, United States	Hard	(United States) Sandra Cacic	2–6, 7–6^{(6)}, 5–7

=== Doubles (0–3) ===
Result	No.	Date	Tournament	Surface	Partner	Opponents	Score
Loss	1.	14 June 1998	Hilton Head, United States	Hard	(United States) Holly Parkinson	(United States) Sandy Sureephong (Canada) Vanessa Webb	2–6, 6–7^{(4)}
Loss	2.	17 May 1999	Jackson, United States	Clay	(Canada) Renata Kolbovic	(United States) Julie Steven (United States) Lindsay Lee-Waters	6–4, 5–7, 2–6
Loss	3.	20 June 1999	Grado, Italy	Clay	(Italy) Flavia Pennetta	(France) Lea Ghirardi (France) Noëlle van Lottum	6–1, 4–6, 4–6
