= Belgian Open (tennis) =

Defunct tennis tournament
- Tour: ILTF (1913-1969) men ILTF (1913-1972) women ILTF Grand Prix Circuit (men); WTA Tour (women)
- Founded: 1897; 129 years ago
- Abolished: 1981; 45 years ago (men); 2001; 25 years ago (women)
- Location: Brussels (1899-1981, 1988-89); Knokke (1987); Waregem (1992); Liège (1993); Antwerp (1999-2001)
- Category: Tier IV (1993, 1999, 2000, 2002); Tier V (1992, 2001)
- Surface: Clay / outdoor

The Belgian Open or Belgian International was a tennis tournament founded in 1899 as a combined men's and women's clay court tennis tournament.

The tournament was staged as a joint event until 1971 when the women's event was discontinued, the men's event continued under the brand name Belgian Open Championships, then later was known as the Belgian International Championships until 1981 when it was discontinued. In 1987 the tournament was revived as a women's only event also known as the Benelux Open (for sponsorship reasons) that ran annually to 2001 when it was abolished.

== History ==
Originally called the Belgian International Championships it first established in 1899. The championships were not staged during World War I or World War II. In the pre-open era the event was often reported in Belgian press as the Brussels International, or International of the tennis club in Brussels it was held at. It was an ILTF-sanctioned event from 1897 until 1969. In 1968 the event was re branded as the Belgian Open Championships until 1970. In 1971 the women's event was discontinued, however the men's event carried on under the new brand name Belgian Open through till 1981 when it was discontinued. In 1970 the men's tournament was an ILTF-sanctioned independent event, then it joined the Grand Prix tennis circuit until 1972, before going back on to the previous circuit until 1976. Between 1977 and 1981 it was graded as Grand Prix event until the men's event ended.

The women's original tournament was part of the 1970 1970 ILTF Women's Tennis Circuit, and the 1971 ILTF Women's Tennis Circuit when that event was ended. In 1987 the tournament was revived as a women's event as part of the Virginia Slims World Championship Series tennis over three different periods during 1987–2002. The competition took place in July during 1987–1989 and 2002, and in May during 1992–1993 and 1999–2001. 2000 and 2001 it was sponsored by Dutch clothing chain Mexx and renamed the Benelux Open. The competition was played on outdoor clay courts.

The tournament was a Tier V event in 1992 and 2001, and a Tier IV event in 1993, 1999, 2000 and 2002. Only one Belgian woman won the singles event; the then little-known Justine Henin, aged 16 in 1999. However, Sabine Appelmans, Kim Clijsters and Els Callens all won the doubles event.

== Finals ==
=== Men's singles ===
(incomplete roll)
In 1930 two editions of the men's event were held one in June denoted as (*), the other in September denoted as (**).

Year	Champions	Runners-up	Score
1899	(United Kingdom) Herbert Roper Barrett	(Belgium) Paul de Borman	6–2, 6–0, 6–2
1900	(United Kingdom) Herbert Roper Barrett (2)	(Belgium) Paul de Borman	6–3, 6–3, 6–2
1901	(United Kingdom) Herbert Roper Barrett (3)	(Belgium) Willie Lemaire de Warzeé	6–1, 6–2, 6–4
1902	(United Kingdom) Herbert Roper Barrett (4)	(Belgium) Paul de Borman	6–3, 7–5, 7–5
1903	(United Kingdom) Herbert Roper Barrett (5)	(Belgium) Paul de Borman	6–4, 6–3, 3–6, 6–3
1905	(Belgium) Paul de Borman	(United Kingdom) Herbert Roper Barrett	4–6, 6–1, 8–6, 6–0
1906	(United Kingdom) Herbert Roper Barrett (6)	(Belgium) Willie Lemaire de Warzeé	6–2, 6–2, 6–4
1910	(New Zealand) Anthony Wilding	(Belgium) Réginald Storms	6–0, 6–1, 4–3, rtd.
1912	(Belgium) Georges Watson	(Belgium) Willie Lemaire de Warzeé	6–2, 6–1, 6–1
1913	(Belgium) Paul de Borman (2)	(Belgium) Georges Watson	6–3, 3–6, 1–6, 6–4, 6–3
1914	(Belgium) Jean Washer	(Belgium) Willie Lemaire de Warzeé	6–4, 6–3, 6–1
1915-1919	Not held (due to World War I)		
1920	(Belgium) Jean Washer (2)	(Netherlands) Gerard Scheurleer	6–0, 6–2, 6–3
1921	(Netherlands) Arthur Diemer Kool	(United States) Amos Niven Wilder	6–1, 8–6, 6–2
1925	(Belgium) Jean Washer (3)	(Belgium) André Laloux	6–2, 6–0, 6–3
1930 *	(France) Jean Borotra	(France) Henri Cochet	4–6, 6–3, 6–4, 4–6, 8–6
1930 **	(Austria) Franz Matejka	(France) Jean Lesueur	6–1, 6–2, 6–3
1932	(France) André Martin-Legeay	(France) Pierre Goldschmidt	6–1, 7–5
1934	(Belgium) André Lacroix	(Belgium) Pierre Geelhand de Merxem	6–1, 6–3, 6–2
1935	(United Kingdom) Fred Perry	(Austria) Hermann Artens	6–3, 9–7, 6–3
1936	(Belgium) André Lacroix (2)	(Belgium) Jack Van den Eynde	1–6, 6–2, 6–4
1937	(France) Patrick Tiberghien	(Netherlands) Hans van Swol	6–3, 6–4
1940-1946	Not held (due to World War II)		
1947	(Belgium) Jacques Peten	(Egypt) Andre Najar	6–2, 6–4, 6–2
1948	(United States) Frank Parker	(United States) Budge Patty	6–1, 1–6, 3–6, 6–1, 6–2
1949	(France) Bernard Destremau	(Socialist Federal Republic of Yugoslavia) Franjo Punčec	1–1, rtd.
1950	(Belgium) Pierre Geelhand de Merxem	(France) Jacques Sanglier	6–3, 5–7, 6–1
1951	(South Africa) Eric Sturgess	(Egypt) Jaroslav Drobný	6–0, 6–1, 6–0
1952	(Australia) Ken McGregor	(United States) Tony Trabert	6–4, 6–2, 5–7, 2–6, 6–4
1954	(Canada) Lorne Main	(United States) Irvin Dorfman	6–2, 1–6, 6–3, 6–4
1955	(Australia) Mervyn Rose	(Belgium) Philippe Washer	7–5, 6–1
1956	(Belgium) Jacques Brichant	(Sweden) Ulf Schmidt	6–3, 6–1
1957	(Belgium) Jacques Brichant (2)	(Austria) Ladislav Legenstein	6–4, 6–2, 5–7, 2–6, 6–4
1958	(Belgium) Jacques Brichant (3)	(Sweden) Ulf Schmidt	6–2, 8–6
1959	(Belgium) Jacques Brichant (4)	(Mexico) Antonio Palafox	8–6, 6–2, 6–1
1960	(United Kingdom) Billy Knight	(Belgium) Jacques Brichant	9–7, 6–4
1961	(Belgium) Jacques Brichant (5)	(Mexico) Mario Llamas	6–3, 6–8, 6–4
1962	(Belgium) Jacques Brichant (6)	(India) Ramanathan Krishnan	6–2, 6–4
1963	(India) Ramanathan Krishnan	(Italy) Nicola Pietrangeli	6–1, 1–6, 6–2
1964	(France) Michel Leclercq	(France) Alain Bresson	6–3, 6–2, 6–4
1965	(Australia) Ken Fletcher	(Brazil) José Edison Mandarino	11–9, 4–6, 6–2
1966	(Netherlands) Tom Okker	(Australia) Bob Carmichael	8–10, 6–3, 6–3
1967	(Netherlands) Tom Okker (2)	(Australia) Jim Moore	6–2, 6–2, 6–0
1968	(Czechoslovakia) Štěpán Koudelka	(United States) Steve Tidball	1–6, 6–1, 6–2
↓ Open Era ↓
1969	(Netherlands) Tom Okker (3)	(Socialist Federal Republic of Yugoslavia) Željko Franulović	6–4, 1–6, 6–2, 6–2
1970	(Netherlands) Tom Okker (4)	(Romania) Ilie Năstase	6–3, 6–4, 0–6, 4–6, 6–4
1971	(South Africa) Cliff Drysdale	(Romania) Ilie Năstase	6–0, 6–1, 7–5
1972	(Spain) Manuel Orantes	(Spain) Andrés Gimeno	6–4, 6–1, 2–6, 7–5
1973-1976	Not held		
1977	(United States) Harold Solomon	(West Germany) Karl Meiler	7–5, 3–6, 2–6, 6–3, 6–4
1978	(West Germany) Werner Zirngibl	(Argentina) Ricardo Cano	1–6, 6–3, 6–4, 6–3
1979	(Hungary) Balázs Taróczy	(Czechoslovakia) Ivan Lendl	6–1, 1–6, 6–3
1980	(Australia) Peter McNamara	(Hungary) Balázs Taróczy	7–6, 6–3, 6–0
1981	(Socialist Federal Republic of Yugoslavia) Marko Ostoja	(Ecuador) Ricardo Ycaza	4–6, 6–4, 7–5

=== Men's doubles ===
Year	Champions	Runners-up	Score
1971	Not finished		
1972	(Spain) Juan Gisbert Sr. (Spain) Manuel Orantes	(Chile) Patricio Cornejo (Chile) Jaime Fillol	9–7, 6–3
1977	Not finished		
1978	(France) Jean-Louis Haillet (Italy) Antonio Zugarelli	(New Zealand) Onny Parun (Czech Republic) Vladimír Zedník	6–3, 4–6, 7–5
1979	(United States) Billy Martin (Australia) Peter McNamara	(Brazil) Carlos Kirmayr (Hungary) Balázs Taróczy	5–7, 7–5, 6–4
1980	(United States) Steve Krulevitz (Belgium) Thierry Stevaux	(United States) Eric Fromm (United States) Cary Leeds	6–3, 7–5
1981	(Argentina) Ricardo Cano (Ecuador) Andrés Gómez	(Brazil) Carlos Kirmayr (Brazil) Cássio Motta	6–2, 6–2

=== Women's singles ===
(incomplete roll)

Year	Champion	Runner-up	Score
1897	(Netherlands) Mlle van Lennep	(Netherlands) Mlle van Aken	6–1, 6–1
1899	(Belgium) Marie-Rose Trasenster	(Belgium) Alice Blanpain Comblen	7–5, 4–6, 8–6
1900	(Belgium) Alice Blanpain Comblen	(Belgium) Marie-Rose Trasenster	7–9, 7–5, 9–7
1901	(Belgium) Marie-Rose Trasenster (2)	(Belgium) Mme Everaerts	6–2, 6–2
1902	(United Kingdom) Mildred Coles	(United Kingdom) Mabel Squire	divided title
1903	(Belgium) Jeanne Chazal	(Netherlands) Digna Mijer van Lennep	6–3, 6–0
1904	(United States) Vera Warden	(Germany) Ilse Seligman	6–3, 6–4
1905	(Belgium) Jeanne Chazal (2)	(Belgium) Marie-Rose Trasenster	6–0, 7–5
1906	(Belgium) Marie Dufrénoy	(Belgium) Jeanne Chazal	6–3, 2–6, 6–4
1907	(United Kingdom) Mildred Coles (2)	(Belgium) Marie Dufrénoy	6–3, 11–9
1908	(Belgium) Marie Dufrénoy (2)	(United Kingdom) Mildred Coles	4–6, 6–4, 7–5
1909	(United Kingdom) Mildred Coles (3)	(Belgium) Geneviève de Mot	6–4, 6–3
1910	(Belgium) Jeanne Liebrechts	(United Kingdom) Betty F.B. N. Quicke	2–6, 10–8, 6–2
1911	(Belgium) Anne de Borman	(Belgium) Jeanne Liebrechts	6–4, 6–3
1912	(Belgium) Anne de Borman (2)	(Belgium) Geneviève de Mot	6–4, 6–3
1913	(Belgium) Anne de Borman (3)	(Belgium) Marguerite Leguerrier	6–3, 6–2
1914	(Belgium) Jeanne Liebrechts	(Belgium) Anne de Borman	6–4, 6–4
1915-1919	Not held (due to World War I)		
1920	(Belgium) Anne de Borman (4)	(Belgium) Marie Storms	11–13, 6–4, 6–4
1921	(Belgium) Marie Storms	(Belgium) Mlle de Spirlet	6–2, 6–0
1930	(France) Simonne Mathieu	(United Kingdom) Elsa McAlpin Haylock	1–6, 6–1, 8–6
1931	(United Kingdom) Susan Noel	(Belgium) Marguerite du Monceau	6–2, 6–2
1932	(Belgium) Josane Sigart	(Spain) Lili de Alvarez	6–0, 2–6, 12–10
1934	(Belgium) Nelly Adamson	(Belgium) Marguerite du Monceau	5–7, 6–0, 6–3
1935	(Denmark) Hilde Krahwinkel Sperling	(France) Simonne Mathieu	7–5, 6–3
1936	(France) Sylvia Aubert	(United Kingdom) Susan Noel	7–5, 6–4
1937	(Belgium) Nadine De Bary	(Belgium) Sole	0–6, 6–4, 6–4
1939	(Belgium) Yvonne Hoyaux	(United Kingdom) Susan Noel	6–4, 3–6, 6–4
1940-1946	Not held (due to World War II)		
1947	(Belgium) Myriam de Borman	(Belgium) Josane de Meulemeester	12–10, 6–4
1948	(United States) Pat Canning Todd	(Hungary) Zsuzsa Körmöczy	6–2, 6–2
1949	(Belgium) Myriam de Borman	(Netherlands) Nel Hermsen	6–4, 6–1
1950	(Netherlands) Nel Hermsen	(France) Myrtil Dubois-Brunarius	6–3, 6–1
1951	(United States) Barbara Scofield Davidson	(Belgium) Christiane Mercelis	6–3, 6–0
1952	(United Kingdom) Angela Mortimer	(United Kingdom) Patricia Harrison	6–3, 6–4
1954	(Mexico) Melita Ramirez	(United States) Dorothy Watman Levine	6–3, 6–4
1955	(Italy) Lea Pericoli	(Belgium) Christiane Mercelis	6–3, 6–3
1956	Unknown		
1957	(South Africa) Heather Brewer-Segal	(Belgium) Christiane Mercelis	3–6, 6–4, 6–1
1958	(United States) Dottie Head Knode	(Belgium) Christiane Mercelis	6–1, 6–2
1959	(Belgium) Christiane Mercelis (2)	(Chile) Alice Heegewalt	6–2, 6–1
1960	(Belgium) Christiane Mercelis (3)	(Australia) Norma Marsh	4–6, 6–4, 6–3
1961	(Belgium) Christiane Mercelis (4)	(Spain) Carmen Hernandez-Coronado	6–2, 6–4
1962-1963	No international event held		
1964	(Belgium) Christiane Mercelis (5)	(France) Jacqueline Kermina	6–1, 6–4
1965	(United States) Julie Heldman	(Australia) Gail Sherriff	9–7, 6–1
1966	(Australia) Judy Tegart	(Australia) Gail Sherriff	6–4, 6–4
1967	(Australia) Gail Sherriff	(Belgium) Ingrid Loeys	4–6, 7–5, 6–1
1968	(Australia) Judy Tegart (2)	(Australia) Gail Sherriff	6–3, 7–5
↓ Open Era ↓
1969	(United Kingdom) Ann Haydon Jones	(United States) Rosie Casals	6–4, 6–0
1970	(United States) Julie Heldman (2)	(United States) Peaches Bartkowicz	6–1, 6–2
1971-1986	Not held		
1987	(United States) Kathleen Horvath	(West Germany) Bettina Bunge	6–1, 7–6
1988	(Spain) Arantxa Sánchez Vicario	(Italy) Raffaella Reggi	6–0, 7–5
1989	(Czechoslovakia) Radka Zrubáková	(Argentina) Mercedes Paz	7–6, 6–4
1990-1991	Not held		
1992	(Germany) Wiltrud Probst	(Germany) Meike Babel	6–2, 6–3
1993	(Czech Republic) Radka Bobková	(Austria) Karin Kschwendt	6–3, 4–6, 6–2
1994-1998	Not held		
1999	(Belgium) Justine Henin	(France) Sarah Pitkowski	6–1, 6–2
2000	(South Africa) Amanda Coetzer	(Spain) Cristina Torrens Valero	4–6, 6–2, 6–3
2001	(Germany) Barbara Rittner	(Czech Republic) Klára Zakopalová	6–3, 6–2

=== Women's doubles ===
Year	Champions	Runners-up	Score
1987	(West Germany) Bettina Bunge (Bulgaria) Manuela Maleeva	(United States) Kathleen Horvath (Netherlands) Marcella Mesker	4–6, 6–4, 6–4
1988	(Argentina) Mercedes Paz (Denmark) Tine Scheuer-Larsen	(Bulgaria) Katerina Maleeva (Italy) Raffaella Reggi	7–6, 6–1
1989	(Netherlands) Manon Bollegraf (Argentina) Mercedes Paz	(Netherlands) Carin Bakkum (Netherlands) Simone Schilder	6–1, 6–2
1990-1991	Not held		
1992	(Netherlands) Manon Bollegraf (Netherlands) Caroline Vis	(Soviet Union) Elena Brioukhovets (Czechoslovakia) Petra Langrová	6–4, 6–3
1993	(Czech Republic) Radka Bobková (Argentina) María José Gaidano	(Belgium) Ann Devries (Belgium) Dominique Monami	6–4, 2–6, 7–6
1994-98	Not held		
1999	(Italy) Laura Golarsa (Slovenia) Katarina Srebotnik	(Australia) Louise Pleming (United States) Meghann Shaughnessy	6–4, 6–2
2000	(Belgium) Sabine Appelmans (Belgium) Kim Clijsters	(United States) Jennifer Hopkins (Slovenia) Petra Rampre	6–1, 6–1
2001	(Belgium) Els Callens (Spain) Virginia Ruano Pascual	(Netherlands) Kristie Boogert (Netherlands) Miriam Oremans	6–3, 3–6, 6–4

== See also ==
- Diamond Games – women's tournament (2002–2008, 2015)
- Category:National and multi-national tennis tournaments
