= Toyota Princess Cup =

Defunct tennis tournament
- Tour: Women's Tennis Association
- Founded: 1997
- Abolished: 2002
- Editions: 6
- Location: Tokyo, Japan
- Category: Tier II
- Surface: Hard / outdoor

The Toyota Princess Cup was a WTA Tour affiliated women's tennis tournament held annually from 1997 to 2002. It was played in Tokyo, Japan and was categorized as a Tier II event.

Competitors played their matches on outdoor hardcourts. Monica Seles and Serena Williams each won the event twice, with Seles collecting a further two titles in the doubles event. Ai Sugiyama was the only winner from Japan, with her two triumphs coming in the doubles in 1997 and 2000.

== Prize money ==
These were the total prize funds for each tournament.

Year	Prize money
1997–98	$450,000
1999	$520,000
2000	$535,000
2001	$565,000
2002	$585,000

== Results ==
=== Singles ===
Year	Champion	Runner-up	Score
1997	(United States) Monica Seles	(Spain) Arantxa Sánchez Vicario	6–1, 3–6, 7–6
1998	(United States) Monica Seles	(Spain) Arantxa Sánchez Vicario	4–6, 6–3, 6–4
1999	(United States) Lindsay Davenport	(United States) Monica Seles	7–5, 7–6
2000	(United States) Serena Williams	(France) Julie Halard-Decugis	7–5, 6–1
2001	(Federal Republic of Yugoslavia) Jelena Dokić	(Spain) Arantxa Sánchez Vicario	6–4, 6–2
2002	(United States) Serena Williams	(Belgium) Kim Clijsters	2–6, 6–3, 6–3

=== Doubles ===
Year	Champions	Runners-up	Score
1997	(United States) Monica Seles (Empire of Japan) Ai Sugiyama	(France) Julie Halard-Decugis (United States) Chanda Rubin	6–1, 6–0
1998	(Russia) Anna Kournikova (United States) Monica Seles	(United States) Mary Joe Fernández (Spain) Arantxa Sánchez Vicario	6–4, 6–4
1999	(Spain) Conchita Martínez (Argentina) Patricia Tarabini	(South Africa) Amanda Coetzer (Federal Republic of Yugoslavia) Jelena Dokić	6–7, 6–4, 6–2
2000	(France) Julie Halard-Decugis (Japan) Ai Sugiyama	(Japan) Nana Miyagi (Argentina) Paola Suárez	6–0, 6–2
2001	(Zimbabwe) Cara Black (South Africa) Liezel Huber	(Belgium) Kim Clijsters (Japan) Ai Sugiyama	6–1, 6–3
2002	(Spain) Arantxa Sánchez Vicario (Russia) Svetlana Kuznetsova	(Hungary) Petra Mandula (Austria) Patricia Wartusch	6–2, 6–4
