= 2001 Internationaux de Tennis Feminin Nice =

- Date: 12–18 February
- Edition: 1st
- Category: Tier II
- Draw: 28S /16D
- Prize money: $565,000
- Surface: hard, indoor
- Location: Nice, France

Champions

Singles
- (France) Amélie Mauresmo

Doubles
- (France) Émilie Loit / (France) Anne-Gaëlle Sidot
| Internationaux de Tennis Feminin Nice |

The 2001 Internationaux de Tennis Feminin Nice was a women's tennis tournament played on indoor hard courts in Nice, France, and was part of Tier II of the 2001 WTA Tour. It was the inaugural edition of the tournament and ran from 12 February until 18 February 2001. Seventh-seeded Amélie Mauresmo won the singles title and earned $90,000 first-prize money.

== Finals ==
=== Singles ===
(France) Amélie Mauresmo defeated (Bulgaria) Magdalena Maleeva 6–2, 6–0

- It was Mauresmo's 2nd title of the year and the 5th of her career.

=== Doubles ===
(France) Émilie Loit / (France) Anne-Gaëlle Sidot defeated (United States) Kimberly Po / (France) Nathalie Tauziat 1–6, 6–2, 6–0

- It was Loit's only title of the year and the 3rd of her career. It was Sidot's only title of the year and the 2nd of her career.
