= 2000 estyle.com Classic =

- Date: August 7–13
- Edition: 27th
- Category: Tier II
- Draw: 28S / 16D
- Prize money: $535,000
- Surface: Hard / outdoor
- Location: Manhattan Beach, California, U.S.

Champions

Singles
- (United States) Serena Williams

Doubles
- (Belgium) Els Callens / (Belgium) Dominique Van Roost
← 1999 ·	WTA Los Angeles	· 2001 →

The 2000 estyle.com Classic was a women's tennis tournament played on outdoor hard courts. It was part of the Tier II category of the 2000 WTA Tour. It was the 27th edition of the tournament and took place in Manhattan Beach, California, United States, from August 7 through August 13, 2000. Fifth-seeded Serena Williams won the singles title and earned $87,000 first-prize money.

== Finals ==
=== Singles ===
(United States) Serena Williams defeated (United States) Lindsay Davenport, 4–6, 6–4, 7–6^{(7–1)}

- It was the 2nd title in the season for Williams and the 7th title in her singles career.

=== Doubles ===
(Belgium) Els Callens / (Belgium) Dominique Van Roost defeated (United States) Kimberly Po / (France) Anne-Gaëlle Sidot, 6–2, 7–5

- It was the 4th title for Callens and the 4th title for Van Roost in their respective doubles careers.
