= 2001 estyle.com Classic =

- Date: August 6–12
- Edition: 28th
- Category: Tier II
- Draw: 48S / 16D
- Prize money: $565,000
- Surface: Hard / outdoor
- Location: Manhattan Beach, California, U.S.

Champions

Singles
- (United States) Lindsay Davenport

Doubles
- (United States) Kimberly Po / (France) Nathalie Tauziat
← 2000 ·	WTA Los Angeles	· 2002 →

The 2001 estyle.com Classic was a women's tennis tournament played on outdoor hard courts. It was part of the 2001 WTA Tour. It was the 28th edition of the tournament and took place in Manhattan Beach, California, United States, from August 6 through August 12, 2001. Second-seeded Lindsay Davenport won the singles title and earned $90,000 first-prize money.

== Finals ==
=== Singles ===
(United States) Lindsay Davenport defeated (United States) Monica Seles, 6–3, 7–5

- It was Davenport's 4th singles title of the year and the 34th of her career.

=== Doubles ===
(United States) Kimberly Po-Messerli / (France) Nathalie Tauziat defeated (United States) Nicole Arendt / (Netherlands) Caroline Vis, 6–3, 7–5
