= 2001 Internationaux de Tennis Feminin Nice – Singles =

Singles
- 2001 Internationaux de Tennis Feminin Nice

Final
- Champion: (France) Amélie Mauresmo
- Runner-up: (Bulgaria) Magdalena Maleeva
- Score: 6–2, 6–0

Events
Singles	Doubles
← 2000 ·	Internationaux de Tennis Feminin Nice	· 2002 →

Amélie Mauresmo won in the final 6–2, 6–0 against Magdalena Maleeva.

== Seeds ==
A champion seed is indicated in bold text while text in italics indicates the round in which that seed was eliminated. The top four seeds received a bye to the second round.

1. (United States) Venus Williams (semifinals)
2. (Spain) Conchita Martínez (second round)
3. (France) Nathalie Tauziat (second round)
4. (Russia) Elena Dementieva (quarterfinals)
5. (Germany) Anke Huber (semifinals)
6. (United States) Amy Frazier (first round)
7. (France) **Amélie Mauresmo (champion)**
8. (Belgium) Justine Henin (second round)

== Draw ==
=== Key ===
- Q = Qualifier
- WC = Wild card
- LL = Lucky loser
- Alt = Alternate
- SE = Special exempt
- PR = Protected ranking
- ITF = ITF entry
- JE = Junior exempt
- w/o = Walkover
- r = Retired
- d = Defaulted
- SR = Special ranking

=== Final ===
Final
	(Bulgaria) Magdalena Maleeva	2	0
7	(France) **Amélie Mauresmo**	**6**	**6**

=== Top half ===
First round
Q	(Croatia) M Palaveršić	3	3
(France) **A-G Sidot**	**6**	**6**
(Spain) **M Serna**	**6**	4	**6**
WC	(France) É Loit	3	**6**	2
(United States) **M Tu**	**6**	3	**6**
6	(United States) A Frazier	2	**6**	0
Q	(France) **C Pin**	3	**6**	**7**
(Russia) T Panova	**6**	1	5
(Switzerland) P Schnyder	3	**7**	3
(Bulgaria) **M Maleeva**	**6**	5	**6**
Q	(Slovakia) K Habšudová	4	3
8	(Belgium) **J Henin**	**6**	**6**

Second round
1	(United States) **V Williams**	**7^{7}**	**7^{8}**
(France) A-G Sidot	6^{3}	6^{6}
(Spain) M Serna	4	**7^{9}**	5
(United States) **M Tu**	**6**	6^{7}	**7**
4	(Russia) **E Dementieva**	**6**	**6**
Q	(France) C Pin	3	4
(Bulgaria) **M Maleeva**	**7^{7}**	4	**6**
8	(Belgium) J Henin	6^{3}	**6**	4

Quarterfinals
1	(United States) **V Williams**	**6**	**7^{7}**
(United States) M Tu	4	6^{2}
4	(Russia) E Dementieva	3	3
(Bulgaria) **M Maleeva**	**6**	**6**

Semifinals
1	(United States) V Williams	6^{8}	4
(Bulgaria) **M Maleeva**	**7^{10}**	**6**

=== Bottom half ===
First round
7	(France) **A Mauresmo**	**6**	**6**
(Sweden) Å Carlsson	1	3
(Israel) A Smashnova	**7**	2	4
(Czech Republic) **K Hrdličková**	5	**6**	**6**
(Canada) S Jeyaseelan	0	4
(Luxembourg) **A Kremer**	**6**	**6**
5	(Germany) **A Huber**	**6**	**6**
(Czech Republic) D Chládková	4	2
Q	(Germany) A Barna	0	3
(France) **N Dechy**	**6**	**6**
(Italy) **S Farina Elia**	3	**6**	**6**
WC	(France) S Pitkowski	**6**	4	3

Second round
7	(France) **A Mauresmo**	**6**	**6**
(Czech Republic) K Hrdličková	2	2
(Luxembourg) **A Kremer**	**6**	**6**
3	(France) N Tauziat	3	4
5	(Germany) **A Huber**	**6**	4	**6**
(France) N Dechy	2	**6**	3
(Italy) **S Farina Elia**	**6**	**6**
WC/2	(Spain) C Martínez	2	2

Quarterfinals
7	(France) **A Mauresmo**	**6**	**6**
(Luxembourg) A Kremer	2	3
5	(Germany) **A Huber**	**6**	**6**
(Italy) S Farina Elia	2	2

Semifinals
7	(France) **A Mauresmo**	2	**6**	**6**
5	(Germany) A Huber	**6**	1	1
