= 1999 Acura Classic =

- Date: August 9–15
- Edition: 26th
- Category: Tier II
- Draw: 28S / 16D
- Prize money: $520,000
- Surface: Hard / outdoor
- Location: Manhattan Beach, California, U.S.
- Venue: Manhattan Country Club

Champions

Singles
- (United States) Serena Williams

Doubles
- (Spain) Arantxa Sánchez Vicario / (Latvia) Larisa Neiland
| ← 1998 · | Acura Classic | · 2000 → |

The 1999 Acura Classic was a women's tennis tournament played on outdoor hard courts that was part of the Tier II category of the 1999 WTA Tour. It was the 26th edition of the tournament and took place at the Manhattan Country Club in Manhattan Beach, California, United States, from August 9 through August 15, 1999. Sixth-seeded Serena Williams won the singles title.

== Finals ==
=== Singles ===
(United States) Serena Williams defeated (France) Julie Halard-Decugis, 6–1, 6–4

- It was Williams' 3rd singles title of the year and of her career.

=== Doubles ===
(Spain) Arantxa Sánchez Vicario / (Latvia) Larisa Neiland defeated (United States) Lisa Raymond / (Australia) Rennae Stubbs, 6–2, 6–7^{(5–7)}, 6–0

== Entrants ==
=== Seeds ===
- Rankings per 2nd of August 1999

| Country | Player | Rank | Seed |
|---|---|---|---|
| USA | Lindsay Davenport | 1 | 1 |
| SUI | Martina Hingis | 2 | 2 |
| FRA | Mary Pierce | 6 | 3 |
| ESP | Arantxa Sánchez Vicario | 8 | 4 |
| FRA | Nathalie Tauziat | 10 | 5 |
| USA | Serena Williams | 11 | 6 |
| AUT | Barbara Schett | 13 | 7 |
| FRA | Sandrine Testud | 14 | 8 |

=== Other entrants ===
The following players received wildcards into the singles main draw:

- (United States) Alexandra Stevenson
- (United States) Corina Morariu
- (Croatia) Iva Majoli

The following players received wildcards into the doubles main draw:

- (France) Julie Halard-Decugis / (Croatia) Mirjana Lučić

The following players received entry from the singles qualifying draw:

- (Spain) Magüi Serna
- (Luxembourg) Anne Kremer
- (Argentina) Inés Gorrochategui
- (United States) Lisa Raymond

The following players received entry from the doubles qualifying draw:

- (Belgium) Els Callens / (United States) Debbie Graham

The following players received entry to the doubles division as lucky losers:

- (Romania) Cătălina Cristea / (Romania) Ruxandra Dragomir
