= 2001 Internationaux de Tennis Feminin Nice – Doubles =

Doubles
- 2001 Internationaux de Tennis Feminin Nice

Final
- Champions: (France) Émilie Loit (France) Anne-Gaëlle Sidot
- Runners-up: (United States) Kimberly Po (France) Nathalie Tauziat
- Score: 1–6, 6–2, 6–0

Events
Singles	Doubles
← 2000 ·	Internationaux de Tennis Feminin Nice	· 2002 →

Émilie Loit and Anne-Gaëlle Sidot won in the final 1–6, 6–2, 6–0 against Kimberly Po and Nathalie Tauziat.

== Seeds ==
Champion seeds are indicated in bold text while text in italics indicates the round in which those seeds were eliminated.

1. (United States) Kimberly Po / (France) Nathalie Tauziat (final)
2. (France) **Émilie Loit** / (France) **Anne-Gaëlle Sidot (champions)**
3. (Switzerland) Patty Schnyder / (Spain) Magüi Serna (first round)
4. (Slovakia) Karina Habšudová / (Canada) Sonya Jeyaseelan (semifinals)

== Draw ==
=== Key ===
- Q = Qualifier
- WC = Wild card
- LL = Lucky loser
- Alt = Alternate
- SE = Special exempt
- PR = Protected ranking
- ITF = ITF entry
- JE = Junior exempt
- w/o = Walkover
- r = Retired
- d = Defaulted
- SR = Special ranking

First round
1	(United States) **K Po** (France) **N Tauziat**	**6**	**6**
WC	(France) S Cohen-Aloro (France) S Foretz	2	2
(France) **C Dhenin** (United States) **M Tu**	**6**	**6**
(Italy) A Canepa (Japan) R Hiraki	3	4
4	(Slovakia) **K Habšudová** (Canada) **S Jeyaseelan**	**6**	**1**
(Spain) M Ramón (Spain) G Riera	0	0	r
(Spain) E Bes (Netherlands) S Noorlander	3	2
(Spain) **A Medina Garrigues** (Argentina) **P Tarabini**	**6**	**6**
Q	(France) A-L Heitz (France) É Le Bescond	4	3
(Sweden) **Å Carlsson** (Bulgaria) **M Maleeva**	**6**	**6**
(Germany) **A Huber** (Germany) **B Lamade**	**6**	4	**6**
3	(Switzerland) P Schnyder (Spain) M Serna	3	**6**	4
(Germany) V Henke (Croatia) M Palaveršić	1	3
(Czech Republic) **R Bobková** (Czech Republic) **E Melicharová**	**6**	**6**
(Belgium) J Henin (France) A Mauresmo	3	**7**	1
2	(France) **É Loit** (France) **A-G Sidot**	**6**	5	**6**

Quarterfinals
1	(United States) **K Po** (France) **N Tauziat**	**6**	**6**
(France) C Dhenin (United States) M Tu	0	1
4	(Slovakia) **K Habšudová** (Canada) **S Jeyaseelan**	**6**	4	**6**
(Spain) A Medina Garrigues (Argentina) P Tarabini	3	**6**	3
(Sweden) **Å Carlsson** (Bulgaria) **M Maleeva**	**w/o**
(Germany) A Huber (Germany) B Lamade
(Czech Republic) R Bobková (Czech Republic) E Melicharová	0	3
2	(France) **É Loit** (France) **A-G Sidot**	**6**	**6**

Semifinals
1	(United States) **K Po** (France) **N Tauziat**	**7**	**7**
4	(Slovakia) K Habšudová (Canada) S Jeyaseelan	5	5
(Sweden) Å Carlsson (Bulgaria) M Maleeva	4	2
2	(France) **É Loit** (France) **A-G Sidot**	**6**	**6**

Final
1	(United States) Kimberly Po (France) Nathalie Tauziat	**6**	2	0
2	(France) **Émilie Loit** (France) **Anne-Gaëlle Sidot**	1	**6**	**6**
