= 2000 Acura Classic =

- Date: July 31 – August 6
- Edition: 22nd
- Category: Tier II
- Draw: 28S / 16D
- Prize money: $535,000
- Surface: Hard / outdoor
- Location: San Diego, California, U.S.

Champions

Singles
- (United States) Venus Williams

Doubles
- (United States) Lisa Raymond / (Australia) Rennae Stubbs
- Southern California Open

The 2000 Acura Classic was a women's tennis tournament played on outdoor hard courts in San Diego in the United States. It was part of Tier II of the 2000 WTA Tour. The tournament was held from July 31 through August 6, 2000. Third-seeded Venus Williams won the singles title.

== Finals ==
=== Singles ===
(United States) Venus Williams defeated (United States) Monica Seles, 6–0, 6–7, 6–3

- It was Williams's 3rd singles title of the year and the 12th of her career.

=== Doubles ===
(United States) Lisa Raymond / (Australia) Rennae Stubbs defeated (United States) Lindsay Davenport / (Russia) Anna Kournikova, 4–6, 6–3, 7–6

- It was Raymond's 4th title of the year and the 22nd of her career. It was Stubbs's 4th title of the year and the 25th of her career.
