= 2002 JPMorgan Chase Open =

- Date: August 5–11
- Edition: 29th
- Category: Tier II
- Draw: 48S / 16D
- Prize money: $635,000
- Surface: Hard / outdoor
- Location: Manhattan Beach, California, U.S.

Champions

Singles
- (United States) Chanda Rubin

Doubles
- (Belgium) Kim Clijsters / (Federal Republic of Yugoslavia) Jelena Dokić
← 2001 ·	WTA Los Angeles	· 2003 →

The 2002 JPMorgan Chase Open was a women's tennis tournament played on outdoor hard courts. It was part of the 2002 WTA Tour. It was the 29th edition of the tournament and took place in Manhattan Beach, California, United States, from August 5 through August 11, 2002. Twelfth-seeded Chanda Rubin won the singles title and earned $93,000 first-prize money.

== Finals ==
=== Singles ===
(United States) Chanda Rubin defeated (United States) Lindsay Davenport, 5–7, 7–6^{(7–5)}, 6–3

=== Doubles ===
(Belgium) Kim Clijsters / (Federal Republic of Yugoslavia) Jelena Dokić defeated (Slovakia) Daniela Hantuchová / (Japan) Ai Sugiyama, 6–3, 6–3
