= 2000 estyle.com Classic – Doubles =

Doubles
- 2000 estyle.com Classic

Final
- Champions: (Belgium) Els Callens (Belgium) Dominique Van Roost
- Runners-up: (United States) Kimberly Po (France) Anne-Gaëlle Sidot
- Score: 6–2, 7–5

Details
- Draw: 16
- Seeds: 4

Events
Singles	Doubles
← 1999 ·	LA Women's Tennis Championships	· 2001 →

Arantxa Sánchez Vicario and Larisa Neiland were the defending champions, but Neiland did not compete this year as she retired from professional tennis during this season. Sánchez Vicario teamed up with Barbara Schett and lost in quarterfinals to Kimberly Po and Anne-Gaëlle Sidot.

Els Callens and Dominique Van Roost won the title by defeating Kimberly Po and Anne-Gaëlle Sidot 6–2, 7–5 in the final.

== Seeds ==
1. (United States) Lisa Raymond / (Australia) Rennae Stubbs (quarterfinals)
2. (France) Julie Halard-Decugis / (Japan) Ai Sugiyama (first round)
3. (Switzerland) Martina Hingis / (France) Nathalie Tauziat (quarterfinals)
4. (Spain) Arantxa Sánchez Vicario / (Austria) Barbara Schett (quarterfinals)

== Draw ==
=== Key ===
- Q = Qualifier
- WC = Wild card
- LL = Lucky loser
- Alt = Alternate
- SE = Special exempt
- PR = Protected ranking
- ITF = ITF entry
- JE = Junior exempt
- w/o = Walkover
- r = Retired
- d = Defaulted
- SR = Special ranking

=== Draw ===
First round
1	(United States) L Raymond (Australia) R Stubbs	5	6	6
(South Africa) L Horn (Argentina) L Montalvo	7	1	2
(United States) N Arendt (Netherlands) M Bollegraf	7^{7}	6
Q	(France) N Dechy (Russia) N Petrova	6^{1}	4
3	(Switzerland) M Hingis (France) N Tauziat	6	6
(Spain) C Martínez (Argentina) P Tarabini	2	1
WC	(United States) L Osterloh (United States) A Stevenson	2	6	0
(Belgium) E Callens (Belgium) D Van Roost	6	2	6
(South Africa) S De Beer (Japan) N Miyagi	7^{7}	5	4
(United States) K Po (France) A-G Sidot	6^{4}	7	6
(United States) A Frazier (Netherlands) C Vis	2	3
4	(Spain) A Sánchez Vicario (Austria) B Schett	6	6
(Slovakia) K Habšudová (Romania) R Dragomir	4	2
(Zimbabwe) C Black (Russia) E Likhovtseva	6	6
(Slovenia) T Križan (Kazakhstan) I Selyutina	6	7
2	(France) J Halard-Decugis (Japan) A Sugiyama	3	5

Quarterfinals
1	(United States) L Raymond (Australia) R Stubbs	4	4
(United States) N Arendt (Netherlands) M Bollegraf	6	6
3	(Switzerland) M Hingis (France) N Tauziat	3	5
(Belgium) E Callens (Belgium) D Van Roost	6	7
(United States) K Po (France) A-G Sidot	6	4	6
4	(Spain) A Sánchez Vicario (Austria) B Schett	4	6	4
(Zimbabwe) C Black (Russia) E Likhovtseva	6	2	6^{5}
(Slovenia) T Križan (Kazakhstan) I Selyutina	4	6	7^{7}

Semifinals
(United States) N Arendt (Netherlands) M Bollegraf	6^{0}	0
(Belgium) E Callens (Belgium) D Van Roost	7^{7}	6
(United States) K Po (France) A-G Sidot	6	7
(Slovenia) T Križan (Kazakhstan) I Selyutina	1	5

Final
(Belgium) E Callens (Belgium) D Van Roost	6	7
(United States) K Po (France) A-G Sidot	2	5
