= 2002 JPMorgan Chase Open – Doubles =

Doubles
- 2002 JPMorgan Chase Open

Final
- Champions: (Belgium) Kim Clijsters (Federal Republic of Yugoslavia) Jelena Dokic
- Runners-up: (Slovakia) Daniela Hantuchová (Japan) Ai Sugiyama
- Score: 6–3, 6–3

Details
- Draw: 16
- Seeds: 4

Events
Singles	Doubles
← 2001 ·	LA Women's Tennis Championships	· 2003 →

Kimberly Po-Messerli and Nathalie Tauziat were the defending champions, but Tauziat did not compete this year. Po-Messerli teamed up with Corina Morariu and lost in semifinals to tournament winners Kim Clijsters and Jelena Dokic.

Clijsters and Dokic defeated Daniela Hantuchová and Ai Sugiyama 6–3, 6–3 in the final. It was the 3rd title for Clijsters and the 3rd title for Dokic in their respective doubles careers. It was also the 1st and only title for both players as a pair.

== Seeds ==
1. (Zimbabwe) Cara Black / (Russia) Elena Likhovtseva (quarterfinals)
2. (Slovakia) Daniela Hantuchová / (Japan) Ai Sugiyama (final)
3. (Russia) Elena Dementieva / (Slovakia) Janette Husárová (quarterfinals, withdrew)
4. (Slovenia) Tina Križan / (Slovenia) Katarina Srebotnik (first round)

== Draw ==
=== Key ===
- Q = Qualifier
- WC = Wild card
- LL = Lucky loser
- Alt = Alternate
- SE = Special exempt
- PR = Protected ranking
- ITF = ITF entry
- JE = Junior exempt
- w/o = Walkover
- r = Retired
- d = Defaulted
- SR = Special ranking

=== Draw ===
First round
1	(Zimbabwe) C Black (Russia) L Likhovtseva	6	6
(Chinese Taipei) J Lee (Indonesia) W Prakusya	3	2
WC	(Belgium) K Clijsters (Federal Republic of Yugoslavia) J Dokic	6	6
(Italy) R Grande (Argentina) P Tarabini	1	2
4	(Slovenia) T Križan (Slovenia) K Srebotnik	2	1
(United States) C Morariu (United States) K Po-Messerli	6	6
(United States) C Rubin (Belarus) N Zvereva	6	7
(Austria) B Schett (Ukraine) E Tatarkova	4	5
(South Africa) L Huber (United States) M Navratilova	6	3	7^{10}
(Argentina) P Suárez (Uzbekistan) I Tulyaganova	4	6	6^{8}
Q	(France) N Dechy (United States) M Tu	1	7^{7}	4
3	(Russia) E Dementieva (Slovakia) J Husárová	6	6^{4}	6
(Spain) M Serna (United States) M Shaughnessy	6	7
(South Africa) A Coetzer (United States) L McNeil	4	5
WC	(Czech Republic) D Bedáňová (Bulgaria) M Maleeva	1	4
2	(Slovakia) D Hantuchová (Japan) A Sugiyama	6	6

Quarterfinals
1	(Zimbabwe) C Black (Russia) L Likhovtseva	4	1
WC	(Belgium) K Clijsters (Federal Republic of Yugoslavia) J Dokic	6	6
(United States) C Morariu (United States) K Po-Messerli	7^{7}	0	6
(United States) C Rubin (Belarus) N Zvereva	6^{5}	6	1
(South Africa) L Huber (United States) M Navratilova	w/o
3	(Russia) E Dementieva (Slovakia) J Husárová
(Spain) M Serna (United States) M Shaughnessy	6	3	0
2	(Slovakia) D Hantuchová (Japan) A Sugiyama	2	6	6

Semifinals
WC	(Belgium) K Clijsters (Federal Republic of Yugoslavia) J Dokic	6	4	6
(United States) C Morariu (United States) K Po-Messerli	3	6	4
(South Africa) L Huber (United States) M Navratilova	4	0
2	(Slovakia) D Hantuchová (Japan) A Sugiyama	6	6

Final
WC	(Belgium) K Clijsters (Federal Republic of Yugoslavia) J Dokic	6	6
2	(Slovakia) D Hantuchová (Japan) A Sugiyama	3	3
