= 1999 Acura Classic – Singles =

Singles
- 1999 Acura Classic

Final
- Champion: (United States) Serena Williams
- Runner-up: (France) Julie Halard-Decugis
- Score: 6–1, 6–4

Details
- Draw: 28
- Seeds: 8

Events
Singles	Doubles
← 1998 ·	WTA Los Angeles	· 2000 →

The 1999 Acura Classic singles was the singles event of the twentieth edition of the third tournament in the US Open Series.

Lindsay Davenport was the defending champion, but she was defeated in the semifinals by Julie Halard-Decugis. Serena Williams then defeated Halard-Decugis in the final to win the title.

== Seeds ==
1. (United States) Lindsay Davenport (semifinals)
2. (Switzerland) Martina Hingis (semifinals)
3. (France) Mary Pierce (quarterfinals)
4. (Spain) Arantxa Sánchez Vicario (quarterfinals)
5. (France) Nathalie Tauziat (first round)
6. (United States) Serena Williams (champion)
7. (Austria) Barbara Schett (quarterfinals, retired)
8. (France) Sandrine Testud (first round)

== Draw ==
=== Key ===
- Q = Qualifier
- WC = Wild card
- LL = Lucky loser
- Alt = Alternate
- SE = Special exempt
- PR = Protected ranking
- ITF = ITF entry
- JE = Junior exempt
- w/o = Walkover
- r = Retired
- d = Defaulted
- SR = Special ranking

=== Finals ===
Semifinals
1	(United States) Lindsay Davenport	3	5
(France) Julie Halard-Decugis	6	7
6	(United States) Serena Williams	6	7
2	(Switzerland) Martina Hingis	3	5

Final
(France) Julie Halard-Decugis	1	4
6	(United States) Serena Williams	6	6

=== Top half ===
First round
WC	(United States) A Stevenson	4	4
(Germany) A Huber	6	6
(Spain) C Martínez	6	6
(Austria) S Plischke	3	3
WC	(United States) C Morariu	6	6
8	(France) S Testud	1	3
(Japan) A Sugiyama	6	6
(France) N Dechy	2	3
WC	(Croatia) I Majoli	1	4
(France) J Halard-Decugis	6	6
(United States) A Frazier	3	7	6
5	(France) N Tauziat	6	5	2

Second round
1	(United States) L Davenport	6	6
(Germany) A Huber	2	2
(Spain) C Martínez	7	6
WC	(United States) C Morariu	5	2
3	(France) M Pierce	6	7
(Japan) A Sugiyama	2	5
(France) J Halard-Decugis	7^{7}	7
(United States) A Frazier	6^{5}	5

Quarterfinals
1	(United States) L Davenport	6^{7}	6	6
(Spain) C Martínez	7^{9}	3	2
3	(France) M Pierce	5	2
(France) J Halard-Decugis	7	6

Semifinals
1	(United States) L Davenport	3	5
(France) J Halard-Decugis	6	7

=== Bottom half ===
First round
6	(United States) S Williams	4	6	6
(Russia) E Likhovtseva	6	3	1
(Switzerland) P Schnyder	6	6
Q	(Spain) M Serna	3	4
(Romania) R Dragomir	2	7^{10}	6
Q	(Luxembourg) A Kremer	6	6^{8}	2
7	(Austria) B Schett	6	6
Q	(Argentina) I Gorrochategui	3	2
(Romania) I Spîrlea	4	7^{9}	5
(Belarus) N Zvereva	6	6^{7}	7
(Croatia) M Lučić	3	1
Q	(United States) L Raymond	6	6

Second round
6	(United States) S Williams	6	6
(Switzerland) P Schnyder	3	1
(Romania) R Dragomir	3	1
4	(Spain) A Sánchez Vicario	6	6
7	(Austria) B Schett	2	4
(Belarus) N Zvereva	6	2^{r}
Q	(United States) L Raymond	1	6	3
2	(Switzerland) M Hingis	6	4	6

Quarterfinals
6	(United States) S Williams	6	6
4	(Spain) A Sánchez Vicario	2	3
7	(Austria) B Schett	7^{9}	3	3
2	(Switzerland) M Hingis	6^{7}	6	6

Semifinals
6	(United States) S Williams	6	7
2	(Switzerland) M Hingis	3	5

== Qualifying ==
=== Seeds ===
1. (United States) Lisa Raymond (Qualifier)
2. (Luxembourg) Anne Kremer (Qualifier)
3. (Spain) Magüi Serna (Qualifier)
4. (Zimbabwe) Cara Black (first round)
5. (Puerto Rico) Kristina Brandi (second round)
6. (Colombia) Fabiola Zuluaga (second round)
7. (France) Anne-Gaëlle Sidot (qualifying competition)
8. (Slovenia) Katarina Srebotnik (first round)

=== Qualifiers ===
1. (United States) Lisa Raymond
2. (Spain) Magüi Serna
3. (Argentina) Inés Gorrochategui
4. (Luxembourg) Anne Kremer

== Qualifying draw ==
=== Key ===
- Q = Qualifier
- WC = Wild card
- LL = Lucky loser
- Alt = Alternate
- SE = Special exempt
- PR = Protected ranking
- ITF = ITF entry
- JE = Junior exempt
- w/o = Walkover
- r = Retired
- d = Defaulted
- SR = Special ranking

=== First qualifier ===
First round
1	(United States) Lisa Raymond	6	6
WC	(Canada) Vanessa Webb	0	3
(Russia) Elena Dementieva	6	6
(Greece) Christína Papadáki	4	3
(Bulgaria) Pavlina Stoyanova	6	6
(Australia) Alicia Molik	4	4
(Romania) Cătălina Cristea	2	1
7	(France) Anne-Gaëlle Sidot	6	6

Second round
1	(United States) Lisa Raymond	6	7^{7}
(Russia) Elena Dementieva	1	6^{4}
(Bulgaria) Pavlina Stoyanova	7	3	4
7	(France) Anne-Gaëlle Sidot	5	6	6

Qualifying competition
1	(United States) Lisa Raymond	6	6
7	(France) Anne-Gaëlle Sidot	2	2

=== Second qualifier ===
First round
3	(Spain) Magüi Serna	6	6
WC	(United States) Meghann Shaughnessy	3	4
(Italy) Adriana Serra Zanetti	5	7^{7}	7
(Australia) Nicole Pratt	7	6^{0}	5
(United States) Kimberly Po	6	6
(United States) Jane Chi	1	2
WC	(India) Nirupama Vaidyanathan	1	2
5	(Puerto Rico) Kristina Brandi	6	6

Second round
3	(Spain) Magüi Serna	6	6
(Italy) Adriana Serra Zanetti	3	4
(United States) Kimberly Po	7	6
5	(Puerto Rico) Kristina Brandi	5	2

Qualifying competition
3	(Spain) Magüi Serna	6	4	6
(United States) Kimberly Po	4	6	4

=== Third qualifier ===
First round
6	(Colombia) Fabiola Zuluaga	6	6
(Belgium) Els Callens	0	0
(Argentina) Inés Gorrochategui	6	6
WC	(United States) Jennifer Hopkins	1	3
(Chinese Taipei) Janet Lee	2	4
(Ukraine) Elena Tatarkova	6	6
(Canada) Jana Nejedly	7	6
4	(Zimbabwe) Cara Black	5	2

Second round
6	(Colombia) Fabiola Zuluaga	5	3
(Argentina) Inés Gorrochategui	7	6
(Ukraine) Elena Tatarkova	2	2
(Canada) Jana Nejedly	6	6

Qualifying competition
(Argentina) Inés Gorrochategui	5	6	6
(Canada) Jana Nejedly	7	2	4

=== Fourth qualifier ===
First round
6	(Slovenia) Katarina Srebotnik	4	6^{2}
(United States) Meilen Tu	6	7^{7}
(Latvia) Larisa Neiland	4	7	6
WC	(United States) Sarah Taylor	6	5	1
(Russia) Tatiana Panova	7^{7}	3	6
(Germany) Marlene Weingärtner	6^{3}	6	0
(United States) Jolene Watanabe	4	2
2	(Luxembourg) Anne Kremer	6	6

Second round
(United States) Meilen Tu	2	1
(Latvia) Larisa Neiland	6	6
(Russia) Tatiana Panova	4	6^{5}
2	(Luxembourg) Anne Kremer	6	7^{7}

Qualifying competition
(Latvia) Larisa Neiland	1	1^{r}
2	(Luxembourg) Anne Kremer	6	4
