= 2001 estyle.com Classic – Singles =

Singles
- 2001 estyle.com Classic

Final
- Champion: (United States) Lindsay Davenport
- Runner-up: (United States) Monica Seles
- Score: 6–3, 7–5

Details
- Draw: 48 (3WC/4Q/2LL)
- Seeds: 16

Events
Singles	Doubles
← 2000 ·	LA Women's Tennis Championships	· 2002 →

Serena Williams was the defending champion, but lost in the quarterfinals to Monica Seles.

Lindsay Davenport won the title by defeating Seles 6–3, 7–5 in the final.

== Seeds ==
All seeds received a bye into the second round.

1. (Switzerland) Martina Hingis (semifinals)
2. (United States) Lindsay Davenport (champion)
3. (Belgium) Kim Clijsters (quarterfinals)
4. (United States) Serena Williams (quarterfinals)
5. (France) Nathalie Tauziat (semifinals)
6. (United States) Monica Seles (final)
7. (Russia) Elena Dementieva (quarterfinals)
8. (Russia) ~~Anna Kournikova~~ (withdrew)
9. (Spain) Arantxa Sánchez Vicario (second round)
10. (France) Sandrine Testud (third round)
11. (Federal Republic of Yugoslavia) Jelena Dokic (third round)
12. (United States) Amy Frazier (quarterfinals)
13. (Austria) Barbara Schett (second round)
14. (Uzbekistan) Iroda Tulyaganova (second round)
15. (Russia) Elena Likhovtseva (third round)
16. (United States) Chanda Rubin (second round)

== Draw ==
=== Key ===
- Q = Qualifier
- WC = Wild card
- LL = Lucky loser
- Alt = Alternate
- SE = Special exempt
- PR = Protected ranking
- ITF = ITF entry
- JE = Junior exempt
- w/o = Walkover
- r = Retired
- d = Defaulted
- SR = Special ranking

=== Finals ===
Quarterfinals
1	(Switzerland) Martina Hingis	6	6
12	(United States) Amy Frazier	2	3
4	(United States) Serena Williams	2	6	6^{2}
6	(United States) Monica Seles	6	3	7^{7}
5	(France) Nathalie Tauziat	6	6
3	(Belgium) Kim Clijsters	4	2
7	(Russia) Elena Dementieva	7	4	2
2	(United States) Lindsay Davenport	5	6	6

Semifinals
1	(Switzerland) Martina Hingis	3	6	4
6	(United States) Monica Seles	6	1	6
5	(France) Nathalie Tauziat	1	2
2	(United States) Lindsay Davenport	6	6

Final
6	(United States) Monica Seles	3	5
2	(United States) Lindsay Davenport	6	7

=== Top half ===
==== Section 1 ====
First round
(Germany) J Kandarr	4	0
(United States) L Osterloh	6	6
(Italy) T Garbin	0	1
(Australia) E Dominikovic	6	6
LL	(New Zealand) P Nola	2	2
(Slovakia) J Husárová	6	6
(Russia) T Panova	1	7	1
(Italy) R Grande	6	5	6

Second round
1	(Switzerland) M Hingis	6	7
(United States) L Osterloh	2	5
(Australia) E Dominikovic	1	3
15	(Russia) E Likhovtseva	6	6
12	(United States) A Frazier	7^{7}	6
(Slovakia) J Husárová	6^{5}	4
(Italy) R Grande	6^{4}	2
LL	(Indonesia) W Prakusya	7^{7}	6

Third round
1	(Switzerland) M Hingis	6	6
15	(Russia) E Likhovtseva	0	3
12	(United States) A Frazier	7	6
LL	(Indonesia) W Prakusya	5	3

Quarterfinals
1	(Switzerland) M Hingis	6	6
12	(United States) A Frazier	2	3

==== Section 2 ====
First round
(United States) J Hopkins	7	6
(Tunisia) S Sfar	5	1
(Australia) N Pratt	6	6
(Japan) S Asagoe	3	3
(United States) M Tu	4	2
(Luxembourg) A Kremer	6	6
WC	(United States) CA Avants	7	3	1
Q	(United States) M Irvin	5	6	6

Second round
4	(United States) S Williams	7	6
(United States) J Hopkins	5	3
(Australia) N Pratt	6	6
14	(Uzbekistan) I Tulyaganova	4	1
10	(France) S Testud	6	6
(Luxembourg) A Kremer	2	3
Q	(United States) M Irvin	3	2
6	(United States) M Seles	6	6

Third round
4	(United States) S Williams	6	6
(Australia) N Pratt	3	3
10	(France) S Testud	6	6^{5}	4
6	(United States) M Seles	3	7^{7}	6

Quarterfinals
4	(United States) S Williams	2	6	6^{2}
6	(United States) M Seles	6	3	7^{7}

=== Bottom half ===
==== Section 3 ====
First round
Q	(United States) A Stevenson	1	1^{r}
(Thailand) T Tanasugarn	6	4
(Germany) M Weingärtner	7	5	6
(Russia) E Bovina	5	7	3
(Australia) A Molik	6	6
WC	(Croatia) M Lučić	2	4
(Japan) A Sugiyama	7	1	2
(Zimbabwe) C Black	5	6	6

Second round
5	(France) N Tauziat	6	7^{7}
(Thailand) T Tanasugarn	3	6^{1}
(Germany) M Weingärtner	2	1
11	(Federal Republic of Yugoslavia) J Dokic	6	6
16	(United States) C Rubin	1	6^{4}
(Australia) A Molik	6	7^{7}
(Zimbabwe) C Black	6	3	1
3	(Belgium) K Clijsters	4	6	6

Third round
5	(France) N Tauziat	6	0	6
11	(Federal Republic of Yugoslavia) J Dokic	0	6	2
(Australia) A Molik	6^{3}	3
3	(Belgium) K Clijsters	7^{7}	6

Quarterfinals
5	(France) N Tauziat	6	6
3	(Belgium) K Clijsters	4	2

==== Section 4 ====
First round
(United States) K Brandi	1	6	6
Q	(Japan) R Fujiwara	6	3	1
(France) AG Sidot	6	2	4
WC	(France) V Razzano	3	6	6
(Czech Republic) D Bedáňová	6	3	6
Q	(Chinese Taipei) J Lee	4	6	2
(Argentina) M Díaz Oliva	1	4
(Russia) N Petrova	6	6

Second round
7	(Russia) E Dementieva	w/o
(United States) K Brandi
WC	(France) V Razzano	3	6	6
9	(Spain) A Sánchez Vicario	6	1	4
13	(Austria) B Schett	4	2
(Czech Republic) D Bedáňová	6	6
(Russia) N Petrova	6^{3}	6^{3}
2	(United States) L Davenport	7^{7}	7^{7}

Third round
7	(Russia) E Dementieva	6	6
WC	(France) V Razzano	4	4
(Czech Republic) D Bedáňová	3	3
2	(United States) L Davenport	6	6

Quarterfinals
7	(Russia) E Dementieva	7	4	2
2	(United States) L Davenport	5	6	6
