= 2000 estyle.com Classic – Singles =

Singles
- 2000 estyle.com Classic

Final
- Champion: (United States) Serena Williams
- Runner-up: (United States) Lindsay Davenport
- Score: 4–6, 6–4, 7–6^{(7–1)}

Details
- Draw: 28
- Seeds: 8

Events
Singles	Doubles
← 1999 ·	LA Women's Tennis Championships	· 2001 →

Serena Williams was the defending champion and successfully defended her title by defeating Lindsay Davenport 4–6, 6–4, 7–6^{(7–1)} in the final.

== Seeds ==
The first four seeds received a bye into the second round.

1. (Switzerland) Martina Hingis (semifinals)
2. (United States) Lindsay Davenport (final)
3. (United States) ~~Monica Seles~~ (withdrew due to a left forearm strain)
4. (Spain) Conchita Martínez (quarterfinals)
5. (United States) Serena Williams (champion)
6. (France) Nathalie Tauziat (first round)
7. (Spain) Arantxa Sánchez Vicario (second round)
8. (France) Sandrine Testud (quarterfinals)

== Draw ==
=== Key ===
- Q = Qualifier
- WC = Wild card
- LL = Lucky loser
- Alt = Alternate
- SE = Special exempt
- PR = Protected ranking
- ITF = ITF entry
- JE = Junior exempt
- w/o = Walkover
- r = Retired
- d = Defaulted
- SR = Special ranking

=== Finals ===
Semifinals
1	(Switzerland) Martina Hingis	6	2	3
5	(United States) Serena Williams	4	6	6
(Russia) Elena Dementieva	4	4
2	(United States) Lindsay Davenport	6	6

Final
5	(United States) Serena Williams	4	6	7^{7}
2	(United States) Lindsay Davenport	6	4	6^{1}

=== Top half ===
First round
(United States) C Rubin	6	6
(France) J Halard-Decugis	2	1
(United States) A Frazier	7^{8}	6
Q	(Germany) M Weingärtner	6^{6}	2
(Austria) B Schett	4	1
7	(Spain) A Sánchez Vicario	6	6
WC	(United States) A Stevenson	4	6	6
(Croatia) S Talaja	6	4	2
(Spain) M Serna	7^{8}	3	5
Q	(Thailand) T Tanasugarn	6^{6}	6	7
(Romania) R Dragomir	0	1
5	(United States) S Williams	6	6

Second round
1	(Switzerland) M Hingis	5	7	6
(United States) C Rubin	7	5	1
(United States) A Frazier	6	3	6
7	(Spain) A Sánchez Vicario	3	6	3
4	(Spain) C Martínez	6	7^{7}
WC	(United States) A Stevenson	4	6^{2}
Q	(Thailand) T Tanasugarn	2	2
5	(United States) S Williams	6	6

Quarterfinals
1	(Switzerland) M Hingis	6	6
(United States) A Frazier	2	1
4	(Spain) C Martínez	2	6	2
5	(United States) S Williams	6	4	6

Semifinals
1	(Switzerland) M Hingis	6	2	3
5	(United States) S Williams	4	6	6

=== Bottom half ===
First round
6	(France) N Tauziat	3	4
Q	(Czech Republic) D Bedáňová	6	6
WC	(Croatia) M Lučić	3	3
(United States) L Raymond	6	6
(France) N Dechy	4	6	4
(Russia) E Dementieva	6	4	6
8	(France) S Testud	6	6
(Russia) E Likhovtseva	2	4
(Belgium) D van Roost	6	6
Q	(Russia) T Panova	1	2
(Japan) A Sugiyama	3	4
(France) A-G Sidot	6	6

Second round
Q	(Czech Republic) D Bedáňová	4	4
(United States) L Raymond	6	6
(Russia) E Dementieva	6	6
LL	(United States) K Brandi	4	1
8	(France) S Testud	6	3	7
(Belgium) D van Roost	2	6	5
(France) A-G Sidot	6^{0}	7^{7}	2
2	(United States) L Davenport	7^{7}	6^{4}	6

Quarterfinals
(United States) L Raymond	6	1	4
(Russia) E Dementieva	2	6	6
8	(France) S Testud	4	2
2	(United States) L Davenport	6	6

Semifinals
(Russia) E Dementieva	4	4
2	(United States) L Davenport	6	6
