= 1999 Acura Classic – Doubles =

Doubles
- 1999 Acura Classic

Final
- Champions: (Spain) Arantxa Sánchez Vicario (Latvia) Larisa Neiland
- Runners-up: (United States) Lisa Raymond (Australia) Rennae Stubbs
- Score: 6–2, 6–7^{(5–7)}, 6–0

Details
- Draw: 16
- Seeds: 4

Events
Singles	Doubles
← 1998 ·	WTA Los Angeles	· 2000 →

The 1999 Acura Classic doubles was the doubles event of the twentieth edition of the third tournament in the US Open Series. Martina Hingis and Natasha Zvereva were the reigning champions but Hingis did not compete this year. Zvereva partnered Mary Pierce – they were defeated in the first round by Cara Black and Irina Selyutina.

Arantxa Sánchez Vicario and Larisa Neiland won the title, defeating third seeds Lisa Raymond and Rennae Stubbs in the final.

== Seeds ==
1. (France) Alexandra Fusai / (France) Nathalie Tauziat (first round)
2. (Russia) Elena Likhovtseva / (Japan) Ai Sugiyama (first round)
3. (United States) Lisa Raymond / (Australia) Rennae Stubbs (final)
4. (United States) Serena Williams / (United States) Venus Williams (withdrew)

== Draw ==
=== Key ===
- Q = Qualifier
- WC = Wild card
- LL = Lucky loser
- Alt = Alternate
- SE = Special exempt
- PR = Protected ranking
- ITF = ITF entry
- JE = Junior exempt
- w/o = Walkover
- r = Retired
- d = Defaulted
- SR = Special ranking

First round
1	(France) A Fusai (France) N Tauziat	2	2
(Argentina) I Gorrochategui (Ukraine) E Tatarkova	6	6
(United States) N Arendt (Netherlands) M Bollegraf	3	7	1
(United States) K Po (France) A-G Sidot	6	5	6
3	(United States) L Raymond (Australia) R Stubbs	6	6
Q	(Belgium) E Callens (United States) D Graham	1	1
(Zimbabwe) C Black (Kazakhstan) I Selyutina	7^{7}	6
(France) M Pierce (Belarus) N Zvereva	6^{4}	4
(Austria) B Schett (Switzerland) P Schnyder	4	0
WC	(France) J Halard-Decugis (Croatia) M Lučić	6	6
(Argentina) P Tarabini (France) S Testud	6	6
LL	(Romania) C Cristea (Romania) R Dragomir	1	1
(Latvia) L Neiland (Spain) A Sánchez Vicario	1	6	6
(Slovenia) T Križan (Slovenia) K Srebotnik	6	2	1
(Romania) I Spîrlea (Netherlands) C Vis	6	6
2	(Russia) E Likhovtseva (Japan) A Sugiyama	3	2

Quarterfinals
(Argentina) I Gorrochategui (Ukraine) E Tatarkova	6	6^{5}	3
(United States) K Po (France) A-G Sidot	2	7^{7}	6
3	(United States) L Raymond (Australia) R Stubbs	6	7
(Zimbabwe) C Black (Kazakhstan) I Selyutina	1	5
WC	(France) J Halard-Decugis (Croatia) M Lučić	6	6
(Argentina) P Tarabini (France) S Testud	3	3
(Latvia) L Neiland (Spain) A Sánchez Vicario	6	6
(Romania) I Spîrlea (Netherlands) C Vis	4	2

Semifinals
(United States) K Po (France) A-G Sidot	0	6	1
3	(United States) L Raymond (Australia) R Stubbs	6	3	6
WC	(France) J Halard-Decugis (Croatia) M Lučić	2	5
(Latvia) L Neiland (Spain) A Sánchez Vicario	6	7

Final
3	(United States) L Raymond (Australia) R Stubbs	2	7^{7}	0
(Latvia) L Neiland (Spain) A Sánchez Vicario	6	6^{5}	6

== Qualifying ==
=== Seeds ===
1. (Romania) Cătălina Cristea / (Romania) Ruxandra Dragomir (qualifying competition, lucky loser)
2. (Belgium) Els Callens / (United States) Debbie Graham (qualifiers)

=== Qualifiers ===
1. (Belgium) Els Callens / (United States) Debbie Graham

== Qualifying draw ==
=== Key ===
- Q = Qualifier
- WC = Wild card
- LL = Lucky loser
- Alt = Alternate
- SE = Special exempt
- PR = Protected ranking
- ITF = ITF entry
- JE = Junior exempt
- w/o = Walkover
- r = Retired
- d = Defaulted
- SR = Special ranking

First round
1	(Romania) Cătălina Cristea (Romania) Ruxandra Dragomir	8
(Canada) Vanessa Webb (Germany) Marlene Weingärtner	4
(Australia) Kerry-Anne Guse (Australia) Kristine Kunce	8
(Germany) Julia Abe (South Africa) Esmé de Villiers	4
WC	(United States) Lori McNeil (United States) Alexandra Stevenson	8
(Greece) Christína Papadáki (United States) Laurie Fleming	4
(Japan) Nana Miyagi (United States) Linda Wild	4
2	(Belgium) Els Callens (United States) Debbie Graham	8

Second round
1	(Romania) Cătălina Cristea (Romania) Ruxandra Dragomir	8
(Australia) Kerry-Anne Guse (Australia) Kristine Kunce	4
WC	(United States) Lori McNeil (United States) Alexandra Stevenson	4
2	(Belgium) Els Callens (United States) Debbie Graham	8

Qualifying competition
1	(Romania) Cătălina Cristea (Romania) Ruxandra Dragomir	4
2	(Belgium) Els Callens (United States) Debbie Graham	8
