= 2001 estyle.com Classic – Doubles =

Doubles
- 2001 estyle.com Classic

Final
- Champions: (United States) Kimberly Po-Messerli (France) Nathalie Tauziat
- Runners-up: (United States) Nicole Arendt (Netherlands) Caroline Vis
- Score: 6–3, 7–5

Details
- Draw: 16 (1WC/1Q/1LL)
- Seeds: 4

Events
Singles	Doubles
← 2000 ·	LA Women's Tennis Championships	· 2002 →

Els Callens and Dominique Van Roost were the defending champions, but Van Roost did not compete this year. Callens teamed up with Chanda Rubin and lost in the semifinals to Kimberly Po-Messerli and Nathalie Tauziat.

Po-Messerli and Tauziat won the title by defeating Nicole Arendt and Caroline Vis 6–3, 7–5 in the final.

== Seeds ==
1. (Switzerland) ~~Martina Hingis~~ / (Russia) ~~Anna Kournikova~~ (withdrew)
2. (Zimbabwe) Cara Black / (Russia) Elena Likhovtseva (quarterfinals)
3. (United States) Kimberly Po-Messerli / (France) Nathalie Tauziat (champions)
4. (Belgium) Kim Clijsters / (Japan) Ai Sugiyama (first round)

== Draw ==
=== Key ===
- Q = Qualifier
- WC = Wild card
- LL = Lucky loser
- Alt = Alternate
- SE = Special exempt
- PR = Protected ranking
- ITF = ITF entry
- JE = Junior exempt
- w/o = Walkover
- r = Retired
- d = Defaulted
- SR = Special ranking

=== Draw ===
First round
(Spain) A Sánchez Vicario (Austria) B Schett	6	6
(France) A Fusai (Italy) R Grande	4	2
Q	(Japan) R Hiraki (Australia) A Molik	w/o
(Italy) T Garbin (Slovakia) J Husárová
4	(Belgium) K Clijsters (Japan) A Sugiyama	3	4
(United States) N Arendt (Netherlands) C Vis	6	6
(Federal Republic of Yugoslavia) J Dokic (France) AG Sidot	6	6
(Slovenia) T Križan (Slovenia) K Srebotnik	1	4
(South Africa) L Huber (Argentina) L Montalvo	6	6
(Chinese Taipei) J Lee (Indonesia) W Prakusya	3	4
LL	(United States) A Bradshaw (United States) J Hopkins	1	1
3	(United States) K Po-Messerli (France) N Tauziat	6	6
(Belgium) E Callens (United States) C Rubin	7^{7}	6
WC	(Russia) E Bovina (Croatia) M Lučić	6^{5}	4
(United States) K Schlukebir (Argentina) P Tarabini	3	1
2	(Zimbabwe) C Black (Russia) E Likhovtseva	6	6

Quarterfinals
(Spain) A Sánchez Vicario (Austria) B Schett	6	4	7^{7}
Q	(Japan) R Hiraki (Australia) A Molik	0	6	6^{5}
(United States) N Arendt (Netherlands) C Vis	5	6	7^{8}
(Federal Republic of Yugoslavia) J Dokic (France) AG Sidot	7	3	6^{6}
(South Africa) L Huber (Argentina) L Montalvo	4	4
3	(United States) K Po-Messerli (France) N Tauziat	6	6
(Belgium) E Callens (United States) C Rubin	6	6
2	(Zimbabwe) C Black (Russia) E Likhovtseva	4	2

Semifinals
(Spain) A Sánchez Vicario (Austria) B Schett	4	6	3
(United States) N Arendt (Netherlands) C Vis	6	1	6
3	(United States) K Po-Messerli (France) N Tauziat	6	3	7^{11}
(Belgium) E Callens (United States) C Rubin	1	6	6^{9}

Final
(United States) N Arendt (Netherlands) C Vis	3	5
3	(United States) K Po-Messerli (France) N Tauziat	6	7
