= 2000 Acura Classic – Doubles =

Doubles
- 2000 Acura Classic

Final
- Champions: (United States) Lisa Raymond (Australia) Rennae Stubbs
- Runners-up: (United States) Lindsay Davenport (Russia) Anna Kournikova
- Score: 4–6, 6–3, 7–6^{(8–6)}

Details
- Draw: 16
- Seeds: 4

Events
Singles	Doubles
- Acura Classic

Lindsay Davenport and Corina Morariu were the defending champions, but Morariu did not compete this year. Davenport teamed up with Anna Kournikova; they ended as runners-up.

Lisa Raymond and Rennae Stubbs won the title by defeating Davenport and Kournikova 4–6, 6–3, 7–6^{(8–6)} in the final. It was the 18th title for Raymond and the 24th title for Stubbs in their respective doubles careers. It was also the 4th title for the pair during the season, after their wins in the Australian Open, Rome and Madrid.

== Seeds ==
1. (United States) Lisa Raymond / (Australia) Rennae Stubbs (champions)
2. (United States) Lindsay Davenport / (Russia) Anna Kournikova (final)
3. (United States) Chanda Rubin / (France) Sandrine Testud (semifinals)
4. (Zimbabwe) Cara Black / (Russia) Elena Likhovtseva (semifinals)

== Draw ==
Key

- Q = Qualifier
- WC = Wild card
- LL = Lucky loser
- Alt = Alternate
- ITF = ITF entry
- PR = Protected ranking
- SR = Special ranking
- SE = Special exempt
- JE = Junior exempt
- JR = Junior Accelerator Programme entrant
- CO = College Accelerator Programme entrant
- NG = Next Gen Accelerator Program entrant
- w/o = Walkover
- r = Retired
- d = Defaulted

=== Draw ===
First round
1	(United States) L Raymond (Australia) R Stubbs	6	6
WC	(United States) L Osterloh (United States) A Stevenson	2	4
(United States) E deLone (Australia) N Pratt	0	4
(United States) K Po (France) A-G Sidot	6	6
3	(United States) C Rubin (France) S Testud	6	6
(Belarus) O Barabanschikova (Argentina) P Tarabini	0	2
(Belgium) K Clijsters (Japan) A Sugiyama	6	4	7^{7}
(Slovenia) T Križan (Austria) B Schett	2	6	6^{4}
(United States) N Arendt (Netherlands) M Bollegraf	5	6	5
(South Africa) A Coetzer (United States) L McNeil	7	3	7
(Belgium) D van Roost (Netherlands) C Vis	4	6^{4}
4	(Zimbabwe) C Black (Russia) E Likhovtseva	6	7^{7}
(United States) J Capriati (United States) A Frazier	4	6	6
(France) N Dechy (France) N Tauziat	6	3	3
Q	(South Africa) K Grant (Russia) N Petrova	2	0
2	(United States) L Davenport (Russia) A Kournikova	6	6

Quarterfinals
1	(United States) L Raymond (Australia) R Stubbs	6^{4}	6	6
(United States) K Po (France) A-G Sidot	7^{7}	4	4
3	(United States) C Rubin (France) S Testud	3	6	6
(Belgium) K Clijsters (Japan) A Sugiyama	6	2	3
(South Africa) A Coetzer (United States) L McNeil	3	6^{3}
4	(Zimbabwe) C Black (Russia) E Likhovtseva	6	7^{7}
(United States) J Capriati (United States) A Frazier	4	2
2	(United States) L Davenport (Russia) A Kournikova	6	6

Semifinals
1	(United States) L Raymond (Australia) R Stubbs	6^{4}	6	6
3	(United States) C Rubin (France) S Testud	7^{7}	4	3
4	(Zimbabwe) C Black (Russia) E Likhovtseva	2	6	1
2	(United States) L Davenport (Russia) A Kournikova	6	2	6

Final
1	(United States) L Raymond (Australia) R Stubbs	4	6	7^{8}
2	(United States) L Davenport (Russia) A Kournikova	6	3	6^{6}
