= 2000 Acura Classic – Singles =

Singles
- 2000 Acura Classic

Final
- Champion: (United States) Venus Williams
- Runner-up: (United States) Monica Seles
- Score: 6–0, 6–7^{(3–7)}, 6–3

Details
- Draw: 28
- Seeds: 8

Events
Singles	Doubles
- Acura Classic

Serena Williams was the defending champion, but did not compete this year.

Venus Williams won the title by defeating Monica Seles 6–0, 6–7^{(3–7)}, 6–3 in the final. It was the 3rd title for Williams in the season and the 12th title in her career.

== Seeds ==
The first four seeds received a bye into the second round.

1. (Switzerland) Martina Hingis (quarterfinals)
2. (United States) Lindsay Davenport (second round)
3. (United States) Venus Williams (champion)
4. (United States) Monica Seles (final)
5. (Spain) Conchita Martínez (quarterfinals)
6. (France) Nathalie Tauziat (quarterfinals)
7. (Germany) Anke Huber (first round)
8. (France) Sandrine Testud (quarterfinals)

== Draw ==
Key

- Q = Qualifier
- WC = Wild card
- LL = Lucky loser
- Alt = Alternate
- ITF = ITF entry
- PR = Protected ranking
- SR = Special ranking
- SE = Special exempt
- JE = Junior exempt
- JR = Junior Accelerator Programme entrant
- CO = College Accelerator Programme entrant
- NG = Next Gen Accelerator Program entrant
- w/o = Walkover
- r = Retired
- d = Defaulted

=== Finals ===
Semifinals
(United States) Amy Frazier	2	3
3	(United States) Venus Williams	6	6
4	(United States) Monica Seles	6	7^{7}
(Russia) Anna Kournikova	3	6^{2}

Final
3	(United States) Venus Williams	6	6^{3}	6
4	(United States) Monica Seles	0	7^{7}	3

=== Top half ===
First round
(Belgium) D Van Roost	6	7^{7}
(Japan) A Sugiyama	2	6^{4}
(France) N Dechy	4	6	6
(France) A-G Sidot	6	4	2
(United States) A Frazier	6	7^{7}
7	(Germany) A Huber	0	6^{3}
(South Africa) A Coetzer	4	7	6
(United States) L Raymond	6	5	1
WC	(Colombia) F Zuluaga	2	6	2
Q	(Australia) N Pratt	6	4	6
WC	(Belgium) K Clijsters	3	4
5	(Spain) C Martínez	6	6

Second round
1	(Switzerland) M Hingis	6	7^{7}
(Belgium) D Van Roost	2	6^{2}
(France) N Dechy	3	6	1
(United States) A Frazier	6	3	6
3	(United States) V Williams	6	6
(South Africa) A Coetzer	0	4
Q	(Australia) N Pratt	6	0	3
5	(Spain) C Martínez	4	6	6

Quarterfinals
1	(Switzerland) M Hingis	3	3
(United States) A Frazier	6	6
3	(United States) V Williams	6	6
5	(Spain) C Martínez	3	0

Semifinals
(United States) A Frazier	2	3
3	(United States) V Williams	6	6

=== Bottom half ===
First round
8	(France) S Testud	3	7	6
(United States) C Rubin	6	5	2
(Austria) B Schett	6	4	5
Q	(Russia) T Panova	4	6	7
Q	(United States) M Tu	6	2	6
(Russia) E Dementieva	2	6	3
6	(France) N Tauziat	6	6
Q	(Luxembourg) A Kremer	4	3
(United States) J Capriati	4	0
(Russia) E Likhovtseva	6	6
WC	(United States) A Stevenson	2	3
(Russia) A Kournikova	6	6

Second round
8	(France) S Testud	6	6
Q	(Russia) T Panova	2	3
Q	(United States) M Tu	5	5
4	(United States) M Seles	7	7
6	(France) N Tauziat	6	6
(Russia) E Likhovtseva	1	2
(Russia) A Kournikova	2	6	7
2	(United States) L Davenport	6	4	5

Quarterfinals
8	(France) S Testud	6	2	6^{5}
4	(United States) M Seles	4	6	7^{7}
6	(France) N Tauziat	6	4	5
(Russia) A Kournikova	2	6	7

Semifinals
4	(United States) M Seles	6	7^{7}
(Russia) A Kournikova	3	6^{2}
