= 2002 JPMorgan Chase Open – Singles =

Singles
- 2002 JPMorgan Chase Open

Final
- Champion: (United States) Chanda Rubin
- Runner-up: (United States) Lindsay Davenport
- Score: 5–7, 7–6^{(7–5)}, 6–3

Details
- Draw: 48
- Seeds: 16

Events
Singles	Doubles
- LA Women's Tennis Championships

Lindsay Davenport was the defending champion, but lost against Chanda Rubin in the final, 5–7, 7–6^{(7–5)}, 6–3.

It was the second title for Rubin in the season and the fifth title in her career.

== Seeds ==
All seeds received a bye into the second round.

1. (United States) Serena Williams (quarterfinals)
2. (United States) Jennifer Capriati (quarterfinals)
3. (United States) Lindsay Davenport (final)
4. (Federal Republic of Yugoslavia) Jelena Dokic (semifinals)
5. (Belgium) Kim Clijsters (second round)
6. (Slovakia) Daniela Hantuchová (second round)
7. (Russia) Elena Dementieva (second round)
8. (Czech Republic) Dája Bedáňová (third round)
9. (Bulgaria) Magdalena Maleeva (second round)
10. (Luxembourg) Anne Kremer (third round)
11. (Israel) Anna Smashnova (second round)
12. (United States) Chanda Rubin (champion)
13. (Russia) Tatiana Panova (third round)
14. (United States) Meghann Shaughnessy (second round)
15. (France) Nathalie Dechy (third round)
16. (Thailand) Tamarine Tanasugarn (third round)

== Draw ==
Key

- Q = Qualifier
- WC = Wild card
- LL = Lucky loser
- Alt = Alternate
- ITF = ITF entry
- PR = Protected ranking
- SR = Special ranking
- SE = Special exempt
- JE = Junior exempt
- JR = Junior Accelerator Programme entrant
- CO = College Accelerator Programme entrant
- NG = Next Gen Accelerator Program entrant
- w/o = Walkover
- r = Retired
- d = Defaulted

=== Finals ===
Quarterfinals
1	(United States) Serena Williams	2	6	5
12	(United States) Chanda Rubin	6	4	7
4	(Federal Republic of Yugoslavia) Jelena Dokic	6	6
(Italy) Rita Grande	4	1
(Greece) Eleni Daniilidou	6^{2}	2
PR/3	(United States) Lindsay Davenport	7^{7}	6
(Japan) Ai Sugiyama	6	6
2	(United States) Jennifer Capriati	3	3

Semifinals
12	(United States) Chanda Rubin	6	6
4	(Federal Republic of Yugoslavia) Jelena Dokic	0	2
PR/3	(United States) Lindsay Davenport	6	6
(Japan) Ai Sugiyama	3	4

Final
12	(United States) Chanda Rubin	5	7^{7}	6
PR/3	(United States) Lindsay Davenport	7	6^{5}	3

=== Top half ===
==== Section 1 ====
First round
Q	(Indonesia) A Widjaja	1	6^{0}
PR	(Russia) L Krasnoroutskaya	6	7^{7}
(Uzbekistan) I Tulyaganova	3	6	7
(Italy) Ad Serra Zanetti	6	3	5
Q	(Germany) G Arn	0	3
Q	(United States) M Irvin	6	6
(Russia) E Likhovtseva	4	6^{6}
(United States) A Stevenson	6	7^{8}

Second round
1	(United States) S Williams	6	6
PR	(Russia) L Krasnoroutskaya	4	2
(Uzbekistan) I Tulyaganova	4	2
15	(France) N Dechy	6	6
12	(United States) C Rubin	6	3	6
Q	(United States) M Irvin	1	6	2
(United States) A Stevenson	3	2
8	(Czech Republic) D Bedáňová	6	6

Third round
1	(United States) S Williams	6	6
15	(France) N Dechy	2	1
12	(United States) C Rubin	6	6
8	(Czech Republic) D Bedáňová	2	1

Quarterfinals
1	(United States) S Williams	2	6	5
12	(United States) C Rubin	6	4	7

==== Section 2 ====
First round
WC	(China) S Peng	6	2	5
(Slovenia) T Pisnik	2	6	7
(Slovakia) J Husárová	4	6	6
(Spain) M Serna	6	1	3
(Italy) R Grande	6	6
(Australia) A Molik	4	2
(Argentina) P Suárez	2	6	1
(Slovenia) K Srebotnik	6	4	6

Second round
4	(Federal Republic of Yugoslavia) J Dokic	6	6
(Slovenia) T Pisnik	3	2
(Slovakia) J Husárová	6	6
14	(United States) M Shaughnessy	4	4
9	(Bulgaria) M Maleeva	6	0	3
(Italy) R Grande	4	6	6
(Slovenia) K Srebotnik	6	2	6
5	(Belgium) K Clijsters	4	6	4

Third round
4	(Federal Republic of Yugoslavia) J Dokic	4
(Slovakia) J Husárová	0^{r}
(Italy) R Grande	6	6
(Slovenia) K Srebotnik	2	1

Quarterfinals
4	(Federal Republic of Yugoslavia) J Dokic	6	6
(Italy) R Grande	4	1

=== Bottom half ===
==== Section 3 ====
First round
(Australia) N Pratt	4	4
(Greece) E Daniilidou	6	6
(Switzerland) M-G Mikaelian	3	6	7
WC	(United States) C Morariu	6	3	5
(United States) M Tu	6	7^{7}
(Belarus) T Poutchek	2	6^{2}
(Italy) F Schiavone	3	1
WC	(Russia) E Bovina	6	6

Second round
6	(Slovakia) D Hantuchová	4	2
(Greece) E Daniilidou	6	6
(Switzerland) M-G Mikaelian	2	2
10	(Luxembourg) A Kremer	6	6
13	(Russia) T Panova	6	6
(United States) M Tu	2	4
WC	(Russia) E Bovina	2	7^{7}	3
PR/3	(United States) L Davenport	6	6^{3}	6

Third round
(Greece) E Daniilidou	6	7
10	(Luxembourg) A Kremer	0	5
13	(Russia) T Panova	2	4
PR/3	(United States) L Davenport	6	6

Quarterfinals
(Greece) E Daniilidou	6^{2}	2
PR/3	(United States) L Davenport	7^{7}	6

==== Section 4 ====
First round
(Japan) A Sugiyama	6	6
(Slovakia) H Nagyová	4	3
(South Africa) A Coetzer	6	6
WC	(Federal Republic of Yugoslavia) J Janković	2	2
Q	(United States) A Frazier	6	6
(Austria) B Schett	4	4
(Switzerland) E Gagliardi	6	6
PR	(Colombia) F Zuluaga	0	2

Second round
7	(Russia) E Dementieva	2	7^{7}	5
(Japan) A Sugiyama	6	6^{5}	7
(South Africa) A Coetzer	6	6
11	(Israel) A Smashnova	0	2
16	(Thailand) T Tanasugarn	3	7^{9}	6
Q	(United States) A Frazier	6	6^{7}	1
(Switzerland) E Gagliardi	1	2
2	(United States) J Capriati	6	6

Third round
(Japan) A Sugiyama	6	7^{7}
(South Africa) A Coetzer	1	6^{4}
16	(Thailand) T Tanasugarn	3	7^{7}	2
2	(United States) J Capriati	6	6^{3}	6

Quarterfinals
(Japan) A Sugiyama	6	6
2	(United States) J Capriati	3	3
