= Émilie Loit =

French tennis player

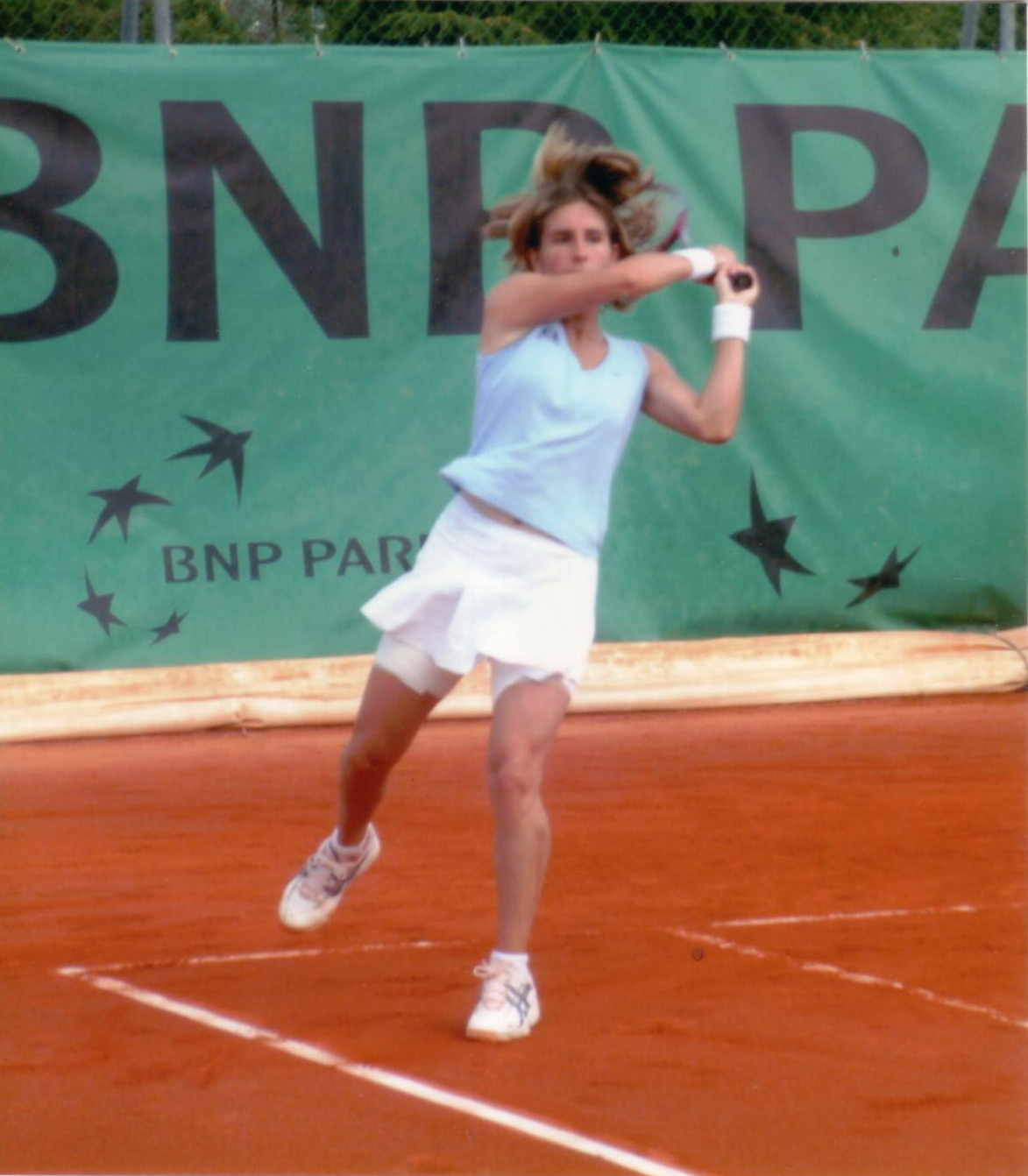
- Country (sports): France
- Residence: Boulogne-Billancourt, France
- Born: 9 June 1979 (age 47) Cherbourg, France
- Height: 1.67 m (5 ft 6 in)
- Turned pro: 1994
- Retired: 2009
- Plays: Left-handed (two-handed backhand)
- Prize money: $2,121,660

Singles
- Career record: 371–295
- Career titles: 3
- Highest ranking: No. 27 (19 April 2004)

Grand Slam singles results
- Australian Open: 4R (1999)
- French Open: 3R (2000, 2002, 2005, 2008)
- Wimbledon: 3R (2003)
- US Open: 3R (2003)

Doubles
- Career record: 265–175
- Career titles: 16
- Highest ranking: No. 15 (10 November 2003)

Grand Slam doubles results
- Australian Open: 3R (2003, 2006)
- French Open: QF (2003, 2005)
- Wimbledon: QF (2004)
- US Open: QF (1998)

Team competitions
- Fed Cup: W (2003)

Émilie Loit (French pronunciation: [emili lwa]; born 9 June 1979) is a former tennis player from France.

Her three career singles titles, all on clay, included Estoril and Casablanca both in 2004, and Acapulco in 2007. She also won 16 doubles titles on the WTA Tour. Her highest rankings were No. 27 in singles and No. 15 in doubles.

On 24 May 2009, right after losing her first-round match at the French Open, she announced her retiring from professional tennis by the end of the tournament.

In summer 2011, she gave birth to a son, Mathias Loit.

== WTA Tour finals ==
=== Singles: 3 (3 titles) ===
Legend
Tier I
Tier II
Tier III, IV & V (3–0)

Result	No.	Date	Championship	Surface	Opponent	Score
Win	1.	Apr 2004	Morocco Open	Clay	(Slovakia) Ľudmila Cervanová	6–2, 6–2
Win	2.	Apr 2004	Portugal Open	Clay	(Czech Republic) Iveta Benešová	7–5, 7–6^{(7–1)}
Win	3.	Mar 2007	Mexican Open	Clay	(Italy) Flavia Pennetta	7–6^{(7–0)}, 6–4

=== Doubles: 26 (16 titles, 10 runner-ups) ===
Legend
Tier I
Tier II (4–5)
Tier III, IV & V (12–5)

Result	No.	Date	Tournament	Surface	Partner	Opponent	Score
Loss	1.	Jan 1999	Hobart International, Australia	Hard	(France) Alexia Dechaume-Balleret	(South Africa) Mariaan de Swardt (Ukraine) Elena Tatarkova	1–6, 2–6
Win	1.	Nov 1999	Pattaya Open, Thailand	Hard	(Sweden) Åsa Carlsson	(Russia) Evgenia Koulikovskaya (Austria) Patricia Wartusch	6–1, 6–4
Win	2.	Jan 2000	Hobart International, Australia	Hard	(Italy) Rita Grande	(Belgium) Kim Clijsters (Australia) Alicia Molik	6–2, 2–6, 6–3
Loss	2.	Feb 2000	Paris Indoors, France	Carpet (i)	(Sweden) Åsa Carlsson	(France) Julie Halard-Decugis (France) Sandrine Testud	6–3, 3–6, 4–6
Win	3.	Feb 2001	Internationaux de Nice, France	Carpet (i)	(France) Anne-Gaëlle Sidot	(United States) Kimberly Po (France) Nathalie Tauziat	1–6, 6–2, 6–0
Win	4.	Apr 2002	Budapest Grand Prix, Hungary	Clay	(Australia) Catherine Barclay	(Russia) Elena Bovina (Hungary) Zsófia Gubacsi	4–6, 6–3, 6–3
Loss	3.	Sep 2002	Bahia Open, Brazil	Hard	(Paraguay) Rossana de los Ríos	(Spain) Virginia Ruano Pascual (Argentina) Paola Suárez	4–6, 1–6
Loss	4.	Dec 2002	Gold Coast Hardcourts, Australia	Hard	(France) Nathalie Dechy	(Russia) Svetlana Kuznetsova (United States) Martina Navratilova	4–6, 4–6
Win	5.	Jan 2003	Canberra International, Australia	Hard	(Italy) Tathiana Garbin	(Czech Republic) Dája Bedáňová (Russia) Dinara Safina	6–3, 3–6, 6–4
Loss	5.	Feb 2003	Diamond Games Antwerp, Belgium	Carpet (i)	(France) Nathalie Dechy	(Belgium) Kim Clijsters (Japan) Ai Sugiyama	2–6, 0–6
Win	6.	Mar 2003	Abierto Mexicano Acapulco, Mexico	Clay	(Sweden) Åsa Svensson	(Hungary) Petra Mandula (Austria) Patricia Wartusch	6–3, 6–1
Loss	6.	Sep 2003	Bali International, Indonesia	Hard	(Australia) Nicole Pratt	(Indonesia) Angelique Widjaja (Venezuela) María Vento-Kabchi	5–7, 2–6
Win	7.	Sep 2003	Shanghai Open, China	Hard	(Australia) Nicole Pratt	(Japan) Ai Sugiyama (Thailand) Tamarine Tanasugarn	6–3, 6–3
Win	8.	Apr 2004	Casablanca Grand Prix, Morocco	Clay	(France) Marion Bartoli	(Belgium) Els Callens (Slovenia) Katarina Srebotnik	6–4, 6–2
Win	9.	May 2005	Rabat Grand Prix, Morocco	Clay	(Czech Republic) Barbora Strýcová	(Spain) Lourdes Domínguez Lino (Spain) Nuria Llagostera Vives	3–6, 7–6^{(8–6)}, 7–5
Win	10.	May 2005	Prague Open, Czech Republic	Clay	(Australia) Nicole Pratt	(Croatia) Jelena Kostanić (Czech Republic) Barbora Strýcová	6–7^{(6–8)}, 6–4, 6–4
Win	11.	Aug 2005	Nordic Light Open, Sweden	Hard	(Slovenia) Katarina Srebotnik	(Czech Republic) Eva Birnerová (Italy) Mara Santangelo	6–4, 6–3
Win	12.	Aug 2005	Budapest Grand Prix, Hungary	Clay	(Slovenia) Katarina Srebotnik	(Spain) Lourdes Domínguez Lino (Spain) Marta Marrero	6–1, 3–6, 6–2
Win	13.	Oct 2005	Tashkent Open, Uzbekistan	Hard	(Italy) Maria Elena Camerin	(Russia) Anastasia Rodionova (Russia) Galina Voskoboeva	6–3, 6–0
Win	14.	Oct 2005	Gaz de France Hasselt, Belgium	Hard (i)	(Slovenia) Katarina Srebotnik	(Netherlands) Michaëlla Krajicek (Hungary) Ágnes Szávay	6–3, 6–4
Loss	7.	Jan 2006	Auckland Open, New Zealand	Hard	(Czech Republic) Barbora Strýcová	(Russia) Elena Likhovtseva (Russia) Vera Zvonareva	3–6, 4–6
Win	15.	Jan 2006	Hobart International, Australia	Hard	(Australia) Nicole Pratt	(United States) Jill Craybas (Croatia) Jelena Kostanić	6–2, 6–1
Win	16.	Feb 2006	Paris Indoors, France	Carpet (i)	(Czech Republic) Květa Peschke	(Zimbabwe) Cara Black (Australia) Rennae Stubbs	7–6^{(7–5)}, 6–4
Loss	8.	Mar 2006	Acapulco Grand Prix, Mexico	Clay	(Japan) Shinobu Asagoe	(Germany) Anna-Lena Grönefeld (United States) Meghann Shaughnessy	1–6, 3–6
Loss	9.	Sep 2006	Portorož Open, Slovenia	Hard	(Czech Republic) Eva Birnerová	(Czech Republic) Lucie Hradecká (Czech Republic) Renata Voráčová	w/o
Loss	10.	Mar 2007	Acapulco Grand Prix, Mexico	Clay	(Australia) Nicole Pratt	(Spain) Arantxa Parra Santonja (Spain) Lourdes Domínguez Lino	3–6, 3–6

== ITF Circuit finals ==
$75,000 tournaments
$50,000 tournaments
$25,000 tournaments
$10,000 tournaments

=== Singles (7–5) ===
Result	No.	Date	Tournament	Surface	Opponent	Score
Loss	1.	26 November 1995	ITF Le Havre, France	Clay (i)	(Tunisia) Selima Sfar	6–0, 3–6, 4–6
Loss	2.	7 October 1996	Open de Saint-Raphaël, France	Hard (i)	(Germany) Susi Lohrmann	7–5, 2–6, 0–6
Win	1.	2 February 1997	ITF Dinan, France	Clay (i)	(France) Emmanuelle Curutchet	6–2, 7–6
Win	2.	11 May 1997	ITF Gelos, France	Clay	(France) Karolina Jagieniak	6–4, 6–2
Win	3.	1 February 1998	ITF Dinan, France	Clay (i)	(France) Élodie Le Bescond	6–1, 6–1
Win	4.	17 September 2000	ITF Bordeaux, France	Clay	(Bulgaria) Lubomira Bacheva	7–5, 6–2
Loss	3.	14 October 2001	ITF Poitiers, France	Clay	(Hungary) Petra Mandula	5–7, 6–2, 1–6
Win	5.	14 April 2002	ITF Dinan, France	Clay (i)	(Czech Republic) Zuzana Ondrášková	6–2, 7–5
Win	6.	5 May 2002	Open de Cagnes-sur-Mer, France	Clay	(Czech Republic) Alena Vašková	7–5, 3–6, 6–4
Loss	4.	16 June 2002	Open de Marseille, France	Clay	(Spain) Conchita Martínez Granados	2–6, 6–3, 5–7
Loss	5.	19 September 2004	ITF Bordeaux, France	Clay	(France) Virginie Razzano	7–5, 6–2
Win	7.	16 October 2005	Open de Touraine, France	Hard (i)	(Croatia) Jelena Kostanić	6–2, 6–1

=== Doubles (5–6) ===
Result	No.	Date	Location	Surface	Partner	Opponents	Score
Loss	1.	2 February 1997	Dinan, France	Hard	(France) Laëtitia Sanchez	(France) Sophie Georges (France) Cécile de Winne	5–7, 2–6
Win	1.	12 April 1998	Estoril, Portugal	Clay	(France) Caroline Dhenin	(Czech Republic) Radka Bobková (Germany) Caroline Schneider	6–2, 6–3
Loss	2.	18 October 1998	Southampton, England	Carpet (i)	(France) Amélie Cocheteux	(Belgium) Els Callens (Belgium) Laurence Courtois	2–6, 2–6
Loss	3.	25 October 1998	Joué-lès-Tours, France	Hard (i)	(France) Amélie Cocheteux	(Czech Republic) Lenka Cenková (Czech Republic) Eva Martincová	6–3, 4–6, 5–7
Loss	4.	6 December 1998	Cergy-Pontoise, France	Hard (i)	(France) Caroline Dhenin	(Netherlands) Kristie Boogert (France) Anne-Gaëlle Sidot	5–7, 2–6
Win	2.	19 September 1999	Bordeaux, France	Clay	(Sweden) Åsa Carlsson	(Bulgaria) Lubomira Bacheva (Spain) Cristina Torrens Valero	6–2, 7–6^{(7–1)}
Win	3.	11 October 1999	Bordeaux, France	Hard (i)	(Sweden) Åsa Carlsson	(France) Alexandra Fusai (Italy) Rita Grande	6–2, 7–6^{(7–5)}
Loss	5.	20 August 2000	Bronx Open, United States	Hard	(France) Alexandra Fusai	(South Africa) Surina De Beer (Japan) Nana Miyagi	7–5, 4–6, 4–6
Win	4.	9 September 2001	Open Denain, France	Clay	(Kazakhstan) Irina Selyutina	(Netherlands) Debby Haak (Netherlands) Jolanda Mens	6–1, 6–3
Win	5.	14 April 2002	ITF Dinan, France	Clay (i)	(France) Caroline Dhenin	(Ukraine) Yuliya Beygelzimer (Belgium) Patty Van Acker	6–3, 6–1
Loss	6.	3 November 2002	ITF Poitiers, France	Hard (i)	(France) Caroline Dhenin	(Bulgaria) Lubomira Bacheva (Russia) Evgenia Kulikovskaya	w/o
