= Internationaux de Tennis Feminin Nice =

Defunct tennis tournament
- Event name: Internationaux de Tennis Feminin Nice (2001)
- Tour: WTA Tour (2001)
- Founded: 2001
- Abolished: 2001
- Surface: Hard (2001)

The Internationaux de Tennis Feminin Nice is a defunct WTA Tour affiliated tennis tournament played in 2001. It was held in Nice in France and played on indoor hard courts.

== Results ==
=== Singles ===
Year	Champion	Runner-up	Score
2001	(France) Amélie Mauresmo	(Bulgaria) Magdalena Maleeva	6–2, 6–0

=== Doubles ===
Year	Champions	Runner-ups	Score
2001	(France) Émilie Loit (France) Anne-Gaëlle Sidot	(United States) Kimberly Po (France) Nathalie Tauziat	1–6, 6–2, 6–0
