= WTA Tier II tournaments =

Tennis tournament category 1988–2008

The WTA Tier II tournaments were Women's Tennis Association second-level tennis tournaments held from 1990 until the end of the 2008 season. The line-up of events varied over the years, with tournaments being promoted, demoted or cancelled.

From 2009 WTA Tour, WTA changed tournament categories, so that the majority of Tier I and Tier II tournaments from the previous season were in one category, the WTA Premier Tournaments.

== Events ==
Tournament	Also currently known as	City/Cities	Country	Court surface	Tier II from	Years
Amelia Island	MPS Group Championships	Ponte Vedra Beach	United States	Clay	1990–2008	1980–2008
Boca Raton	Virginia Slims of Florida	Boca Raton (1987-92); Delray Beach (1993-95)	United States	Clay (1984); Hard (1985–95)	1990; 1993–1995	1984–1995
Houston	Virginia Slims of Houston	Houston, Texas	United States	Clay	1990–1995	1970–1995
Los Angeles	LA Women's Tennis Championships formerly East West Bank Classic	Manhattan Beach (1983-2002); Carson (2003-09)	United States	Hard	1990–2008	1971–2008
Brighton	Brighton International	Brighton	United Kingdom	Carpet	1990–2000	1978–2000
Eastbourne	Aegon International formerly International Women's Open	Eastbourne	United Kingdom	Grass	1990–2008	1974–2008
Hamburg	Betty Barclay Cup	Hamburg	Germany	Clay	1990–2002	1982–1983; 1987–2002
Indian Wells	BNP Paribas Open formerly Pacific Life Open	Indian Wells	United States	Hard	1990–1996	1974–2008
Tokyo (Nicherei)	Nichirei International Championships	Tokyo	Japan	Carpet (1990); Hard (1991-96)	1990–1996	1990–1996
Tokyo (Pan Pacific)	Toray Pan Pacific Open	Tokyo	Japan	Hard	1990–1992	1984–2008
Stanford	Bank of the West Classic	Stanford	United States	Hard	1990–2008	1971–2008
Stuttgart	Porsche Tennis Grand Prix	Filderstadt (1978-2005); Stuttgart (2006-2008)	Germany	Clay (i)	1990–2008	1978–2008
Philadelphia	Advanta Championships of Philadelphia formerly Virginia Slims of Philadelphia	Philadelphia	United States	Carpet (1991-2000); Hard (i) (2003-05)	1991–1992; 1996–2005	1971–2005
Chicago	Ameritech Cup formerly Virginia Slims of Chicago	Chicago	United States	Carpet	1991–1997	1971–1997
Barcelona	Spanish Open	Barcelona (1993-95); Madrid (1996-97)	Spain	Clay	1993–1997	1993–1997
Paris	Open GDF Suez	Paris	France	Hard (i)	1993–2008	1993–2008
Leipzig	Sparkassen Cup	Leipzig	Germany	Carpet	1993–2003	1990–2003
Sydney	Medibank International Sydney	Sydney	Australia	Hard	1993–2008	1885–2008
Madrid	Madrid Open	Madrid	Spain	Clay	1996	1996–2003
New Haven	Pilot Pen Tennis	New Haven	United States	Hard	1997–2008	1948–2008
Tokyo (Princess)	Toyota Princess Cup	Tokyo	Japan	Hard	1997–2002	1997–2002
Linz	Generali Ladies Linz	Linz	Austria	Hard (i)	1998–2008	1987–2008
Scottsdale	State Farm Women's Tennis Classic	Scottsdale	United States	Hard	2000–2003	2000–2003
Dubai	Dubai Tennis Championships	Dubai	United Arab Emirates	Hard	2001–2008	1993–2008
Nice	Internationaux de Tennis Feminin Nice	Nice	France	Carpet	2001	2001
Antwerp	Proximus Diamond Games	Antwerp	Belgium	Hard (i)	2002–2008	2002–2008
Warsaw	Warsaw Open formerly J&S Cup	Warsaw	Poland	Clay	2003–2007	1995–2007
Beijing	China Open formerly Beijing Salem Open	Beijing	China	Hard	2004–2008	1993–2008
Doha	Qatar Total Open	Doha	Qatar	Hard	2004–2007	2001–2008
Luxembourg	BGL Luxembourg Open	Luxembourg City	Luxembourg	Hard (i)	2005–2007	1996–2008
Zürich	Zurich Open	Zürich	Switzerland	Hard (i)	2008	1993–2008
Bangalore	Bangalore Open	Hyderabad (2003–05); Bangalore (2006–2008)	India	Hard	2008	2003–2008

== Results ==
=== 1990 ===
Tournament	Winner	Runner-up	Score
Tokyo (Pan Pacific)	Steffi Graf	Arantxa Sánchez Vicario	6–1, 6–2
Washington	Martina Navratilova	Zina Garrison-Jackson	6–1, 6–0
Indian Wells	Martina Navratilova	Helena Suková	6–2, 5–7, 6–1
Boca Raton	Gabriela Sabatini	Jennifer Capriati	6–4, 7–5
Amelia Island	Steffi Graf	Arantxa Sánchez Vicario	6–1, 6–0
Hamburg	Steffi Graf	Arantxa Sánchez Vicario	5–7, 6–0, 6–1
Eastbourne	Martina Navratilova	Gretchen Magers	6–0, 6–2
Los Angeles	Monica Seles	Martina Navratilova	6–4, 3–6, 7–6^{(8–6)}
Tokyo (Nichirei)	Mary Joe Fernández	Amy Frazier	3–6, 6–2, 6–3
Zurich	Steffi Graf	Gabriela Sabatini	6–3, 6–2
Filderstadt	Mary Joe Fernández	Barbara Paulus	6–1, 6–3
Brighton	Steffi Graf	Helena Suková	7–5, 6–3
Oakland	Monica Seles	Martina Navratilova	6–3, 7–6^{(7–5)}
Worcester	Steffi Graf	Gabriela Sabatini	7–6, 6–3

=== 1991 ===
Tournament	Winner	Runner-up	Score
Tokyo (Pan Pacific)	Gabriela Sabatini	Martina Navratilova	2–6, 6–2, 6–4
Chicago	Martina Navratilova	Zina Garrison-Jackson	6–1, 6–2
Palm Springs	Martina Navratilova	Monica Seles	6–2, 7–6^{(8–6)}
Amelia Island	Gabriela Sabatini	Steffi Graf	7–5, 7–6^{(7–3)}
Houston	Monica Seles	Mary Joe Fernández	6–4, 6–3
Hamburg	Steffi Graf	Monica Seles	7–5, 6–7^{(4–7)}, 6–3
Eastbourne	Martina Navratilova	Arantxa Sánchez Vicario	6–4, 6–4
Los Angeles	Monica Seles	Kimiko Date	6–3, 6–1
Washington	Arantxa Sánchez Vicario	Katerina Maleeva	6–1, 5–7, 6–4
Tokyo (Nichirei)	Monica Seles	Mary Joe Fernández	6–1, 6–1
Zurich	Steffi Graf	Nathalie Tauziat	6–4, 6–4
Filderstadt	Anke Huber	Martina Navratilova	2–6, 6–2, 7–6^{(7–4)}
Brighton	Steffi Graf	Zina Garrison-Jackson	5–7, 6–4, 6–1
Oakland	Martina Navratilova	Monica Seles	6–3, 3–6, 6–3
Philadelphia	Monica Seles	Jennifer Capriati	7–5, 6–1

=== 1992 ===
Tournament	Winner	Runner-up	Score
Tokyo (Pan Pacific)	Gabriela Sabatini	Martina Navratilova	6–2, 4–6, 6–2
Essen	Monica Seles	Mary Joe Fernández	6–0, 6–3
Chicago	Martina Navratilova	Jana Novotná	7–6^{(7–4)}, 4–6, 7–5
Indian Wells	Monica Seles	Conchita Martínez	6–3, 6–1
Amelia Island	Gabriela Sabatini	Steffi Graf	6–2, 1–6, 6–3
Houston	Monica Seles	Zina Garrison-Jackson	6–4, 6–3
Hamburg	Steffi Graf	Arantxa Sánchez Vicario	7–6^{(7–5)}, 6–2
Eastbourne	Lori McNeil	Linda Harvey-Wild	6–4, 6–4
Los Angeles	Martina Navratilova	Monica Seles	6–4, 6–2
Tokyo (Nichirei)	Monica Seles	Gabriela Sabatini	6–2, 6–0
Zurich	Steffi Graf	Martina Navratilova	2–6, 7–5, 7–5
Filderstadt	Martina Navratilova	Gabriela Sabatini	7–6^{(7–1)}, 6–3
Brighton	Steffi Graf	Jana Novotná	4–6, 6–4, 7–6^{(7–3)}
Oakland	Monica Seles	Martina Navratilova	6–3, 6–4
Philadelphia	Steffi Graf	Arantxa Sánchez Vicario	6–3, 3–6, 6–1

=== 1993 ===
Tournament	Winner	Runner-up	Score
Sydney	Jennifer Capriati	Anke Huber	6–1, 6–4
Chicago	Monica Seles	Martina Navratilova	3–6, 6–2, 6–1
Paris	Martina Navratilova	Monica Seles	6–3, 4–6, 7–6^{(7–3)}
Indian Wells	Mary Joe Fernández	Amanda Coetzer	3–6, 6–1, 7–6^{(8–6)}
Delray Beach	Steffi Graf	Arantxa Sánchez Vicario	6–4, 6–3
Houston	Conchita Martínez	Sabine Hack	6–3, 6–2
Amelia Island	Arantxa Sánchez Vicario	Gabriela Sabatini	6–2, 5–7, 6–2
Barcelona	Arantxa Sánchez Vicario	Conchita Martínez	6–1, 6–4
Hamburg	Arantxa Sánchez Vicario	Steffi Graf	6–3, 6–3
Eastbourne	Martina Navratilova	Miriam Oremans	2–6, 6–2, 6–3
Stratton Mountain	Conchita Martínez	Zina Garrison-Jackson	6–3, 6–2
San Diego	Steffi Graf	Arantxa Sánchez Vicario	6–4, 4–6, 6–1
Los Angeles	Martina Navratilova	Arantxa Sánchez Vicario	7–5, 7–6^{(7–4)}
Tokyo (Nichirei)	Amanda Coetzer	Kimiko Date	6–3, 6–2
Leipzig	Steffi Graf	Jana Novotná	6–2, 6–0
Filderstadt	Mary Pierce	Natasha Zvereva	6–3, 6–3
Brighton	Jana Novotná	Anke Huber	6–2, 6–4,
Essen	Natalia Medvedeva	Conchita Martínez	6–7^{(4–7)}, 7–5, 6–4
Oakland	Martina Navratilova	Zina Garrison-Jackson	6–2, 7–6^{(7–1)}

=== 1994 ===
Tournament	Winner	Runner-up	Score
Sydney	Kimiko Date	Mary Joe Fernández	6–4, 6–2
Chicago	Natasha Zvereva	Chanda Rubin	6–3, 7–5
Paris	Martina Navratilova	Julie Halard	7–5, 6–3
Indian Wells	Steffi Graf	Amanda Coetzer	6–0, 6–4
Delray Beach	Steffi Graf	Arantxa Sánchez Vicario	6–3, 7–5
Houston	Sabine Hack	Mary Pierce	7–5, 6–4
Amelia Island	Arantxa Sánchez Vicario	Gabriela Sabatini	6–1, 6–4
Barcelona	Arantxa Sánchez Vicario	Iva Majoli	6–0, 6–2
Hamburg	Arantxa Sánchez Vicario	Steffi Graf	4–6, 7–6^{(7–3)}, 7–6^{(8–6)}
Eastbourne	Meredith McGrath	Linda Harvey-Wild	6–2, 6–4
Stratton Mountain	Conchita Martínez	Arantxa Sánchez Vicario	4–6, 6–3, 6–4
San Diego	Steffi Graf	Arantxa Sánchez Vicario	6–2, 6–1
Los Angeles	Amy Frazier	Ann Grossman	6–1, 6–3
Tokyo (Nichirei)	Arantxa Sánchez Vicario	Amy Frazier	6–1, 6–2
Leipzig	Jana Novotná	Mary Pierce	7–5, 6–1
Filderstadt	Anke Huber	Mary Pierce	6–4, 6–2
Brighton	Jana Novotná	Helena Suková	6–7^{(4–7)}, 6–3, 6–4
Essen	Jana Novotná	Iva Majoli	6–2, 6–4
Oakland	Arantxa Sánchez Vicario	Martina Navratilova	1–6, 7–6^{(7–5)}, 7–6^{(7–3)}

=== 1995 ===
Tournament	Winner	Runner-up	Score
Sydney	Gabriela Sabatini	Lindsay Davenport	6–3, 6–4
Chicago	Magdalena Maleeva	Lisa Raymond	7–5, 7–6^{(7–2)}
Paris	Steffi Graf	Mary Pierce	6–2, 6–2
Indian Wells	Mary Joe Fernández	Natasha Zvereva	6–4, 6–3
Delray Beach	Steffi Graf	Conchita Martínez	6–2, 6–4
Amelia Island	Conchita Martínez	Gabriela Sabatini	6–1, 6–4
Houston	Steffi Graf	Åsa Carlsson	6–1, 6–1
Barcelona	Arantxa Sánchez Vicario	Iva Majoli	5–7, 6–0, 6–2
Hamburg	Conchita Martínez	Martina Hingis	6–1, 6–0
Eastbourne	Nathalie Tauziat	Chanda Rubin	3–6, 6–0, 7–5
San Diego	Conchita Martínez	Lisa Raymond	6–2, 6–0
Los Angeles	Conchita Martínez	Chanda Rubin	4–6, 6–1, 6–3
Tokyo (Nichirei)	Mary Pierce	Arantxa Sánchez Vicario	6–3, 6–3
Leipzig	Anke Huber	Magdalena Maleeva	Walkover
Filderstadt	Iva Majoli	Gabriela Sabatini	6–4, 7–6^{(7–4)}
Brighton	Mary Joe Fernández	Amanda Coetzer	6–4, 7–5
Oakland	Magdalena Maleeva	Ai Sugiyama	6–3, 6–4

=== 1996 ===
Tournament	Winner	Runner-up	Score
Sydney	Monica Seles	Lindsay Davenport	4–6, 7–6, 6–3
Paris	Julie Halard-Decugis	Iva Majoli	7–5, 7–6^{(7–4)}
Essen	Iva Majoli	Jana Novotná	7–5, 1–6, 7–6^{(8–6)}
Indian Wells	Steffi Graf	Conchita Martínez	7–6^{(7–5)}, 7–6^{(7–5)}
Amelia Island	Irina Spîrlea	Mary Pierce	6–7^{(9–11)}, 6–4, 6–3
Hamburg	Arantxa Sánchez Vicario	Conchita Martínez	4–6, 7–6, 6–0
Madrid	Jana Novotná	Magdalena Maleeva	4–6, 6–4, 6–3
Eastbourne	Monica Seles	Mary Joe Fernández	6–0, 6–2
Los Angeles	Lindsay Davenport	Anke Huber	6–2, 6–3
San Diego	Kimiko Date	Arantxa Sánchez Vicario	3–6, 6–3, 6–0
Tokyo (Nichirei)	Monica Seles	Arantxa Sánchez Vicario	6–1, 6–4
Leipzig	Anke Huber	Iva Majoli	5–7, 6–3, 6–1
Filderstadt	Martina Hingis	Anke Huber	6–2, 3–6, 6–3
Chicago	Jana Novotná	Jennifer Capriati	6–4, 3–6, 6–1
Oakland	Martina Hingis	Monica Seles	6–2, 6–0
Philadelphia	Jana Novotná	Steffi Graf	6–4, Ret.

=== 1997 ===
Tournament	Winner	Runner-up	Score
Sydney	Martina Hingis	Jennifer Capriati	6–1, 5–7, 6–1
Paris	Martina Hingis	Anke Huber	6–3, 3–6, 6–3
Hanover	Iva Majoli	Jana Novotná	4–6, 7–6^{(7–2)}, 6–4
Amelia Island	Lindsay Davenport	Mary Pierce	6–2, 6–3
Hamburg	Iva Majoli	Ruxandra Dragomir	6–3, 6–2
Eastbourne	Cancelled Due To Rain		
Stanford	Martina Hingis	Conchita Martínez	6–0, 6–2
San Diego	Martina Hingis	Monica Seles	7–6^{(7–4)}, 6–4
Los Angeles	Monica Seles	Lindsay Davenport	5–7, 7–5, 6–4
Atlanta	Lindsay Davenport	Sandrine Testud	6–4, 6–1
Tokyo (Toyota)	Monica Seles	Arantxa Sánchez Vicario	6–1, 3–6, 7–6^{(7–5)}
Leipzig	Jana Novotná	Amanda Coetzer	6–2, 4–6, 6–3
Filderstadt	Martina Hingis	Lisa Raymond	6–4, 6–2
Chicago	Lindsay Davenport	Nathalie Tauziat	6–0, 7–5
Philadelphia	Martina Hingis	Lindsay Davenport	4–6, 6–3, 6–4

=== 1998 ===
Tournament	Winner	Runner-up	Score
Sydney	Arantxa Sánchez Vicario	Venus Williams	6–1, 6–3
Paris	Mary Pierce	Dominique Van Roost	6–3, 7–5
Hanover	Patty Schnyder	Jana Novotná	6–0, 2–6, 7–5
Linz	Jana Novotná	Dominique Van Roost	6–1, 7–6^{(7–2)}
Amelia Island	Mary Pierce	Conchita Martínez	6–7^{(8-10)}, 6–0, 6–2
Hamburg	Martina Hingis	Jana Novotná	6–3, 7–5
Eastbourne	Jana Novotná	Arantxa Sánchez Vicario	6–1, 7–5
Stanford	Lindsay Davenport	Venus Williams	6–4, 5–7, 6–4
San Diego	Lindsay Davenport	Mary Pierce	6–3, 6–1
Los Angeles	Lindsay Davenport	Martina Hingis	4–6, 6–4, 6–3
New Haven	Steffi Graf	Jana Novotná	6–4, 6–1
Tokyo (Toyota)	Monica Seles	Arantxa Sánchez Vicario	4–6, 6–3, 6–4
Filderstadt	Sandrine Testud	Lindsay Davenport	7–5, 6–3
Leipzig	Steffi Graf	Nathalie Tauziat	6–3, 6–4
Philadelphia	Steffi Graf	Lindsay Davenport	4–6, 6–3, 6–4

=== 1999 ===
Tournament	Winner	Runner-up	Score
Sydney	Lindsay Davenport	Martina Hingis	6–4, 6–3
Hanover	Jana Novotná	Venus Williams	6–4, 6–4
Paris	Serena Williams	Amélie Mauresmo	6–2, 3–6, 7–6^{(7–4)}
Amelia Island	Monica Seles	Ruxandra Dragomir	6–2, 6–3
Hamburg	Venus Williams	Mary Pierce	6–0, 6–3
Eastbourne	Natasha Zvereva	Nathalie Tauziat	0–6, 7–5, 6–3
Stanford	Lindsay Davenport	Venus Williams	7–6^{(7–1)}, 6–2
San Diego	Martina Hingis	Venus Williams	6–4, 6–0
Los Angeles	Serena Williams	Julie Halard-Decugis	6–1, 6–4
New Haven	Venus Williams	Lindsay Davenport	6–2, 7–5
Tokyo (Toyota)	Lindsay Davenport	Monica Seles	7–5, 6–1
Filderstadt	Martina Hingis	Mary Pierce	6–4, 6–1
Linz	Mary Pierce	Sandrine Testud	7–6^{(7–2)}, 6–1
Leipzig	Nathalie Tauziat	Květa Hrdličková	7–6^{(8–6)}, 4–6, 6–4
Philadelphia	Lindsay Davenport	Martina Hingis	6–3, 6–4

=== 2000 ===
Tournament	Winner	Runner-up	Score
Sydney	Amélie Mauresmo	Lindsay Davenport	7–6^{(7–2)}, 6–4
Paris	Nathalie Tauziat	Serena Williams	7–5, 6–2
Hanover	Serena Williams	Denisa Chládková	6–1, 6–1
Scottsdale	Cancelled Due To Rain		
Amelia Island	Monica Seles	Conchita Martínez	6–3, 6–2
Hamburg	Martina Hingis	Arantxa Sánchez Vicario	6–3, 6–3
Eastbourne	Julie Halard-Decugis	Dominique van Roost	7–6^{(7–4)}, 6–4
Stanford	Venus Williams	Lindsay Davenport	6–1, 6–4
San Diego	Venus Williams	Monica Seles	6–0, 6–7^{(3–7)}, 6–3
Los Angeles	Serena Williams	Lindsay Davenport	4–6, 6–4, 7–6^{(7–1)}
New Haven	Venus Williams	Monica Seles	6–2, 6–4
Tokyo (Toyota)	Serena Williams	Julie Halard-Decugis	7–5, 6–1
Filderstadt	Martina Hingis	Kim Clijsters	6–0, 6–3
Linz	Lindsay Davenport	Venus Williams	6–4, 3–6, 6–2
Leipzig	Kim Clijsters	Elena Likhovtseva	7–6^{(8–6)}, 4–6, 6–4
Philadelphia	Lindsay Davenport	Martina Hingis	7–6^{(9–7)}, 6–4

=== 2001 ===
Tournament	Winner	Runner-up	Score
Sydney	Martina Hingis	Lindsay Davenport	6–3, 4–6, 7–5
Paris	Amélie Mauresmo	Anke Huber	7–6^{(7–2)}, 6–1
Nice	Amélie Mauresmo	Magdalena Maleeva	6–2, 6–0
Dubai	Martina Hingis	Nathalie Tauziat	6–4, 6–4
Scottsdale	Lindsay Davenport	Meghann Shaughnessy	6–2, 6–3
Amelia Island	Amélie Mauresmo	Amanda Coetzer	6–4, 7–5
Hamburg	Venus Williams	Meghann Shaughnessy	6–3, 6–0
Eastbourne	Lindsay Davenport	Magüi Serna	6–2, 6–0
Stanford	Kim Clijsters	Lindsay Davenport	6–4, 6–7^{(5–7)}, 6–1
San Diego	Venus Williams	Monica Seles	6–2, 6–3
Los Angeles	Lindsay Davenport	Monica Seles	6–3, 7–5
New Haven	Venus Williams	Lindsay Davenport	7–6^{(8–6)}, 6–4
Bahia	Monica Seles	Jelena Dokić	6–3, 6–3
Tokyo (Toyota)	Jelena Dokić	Arantxa Sánchez Vicario	6–4, 6–2
Leipzig	Kim Clijsters	Magdalena Maleeva	6–1, 6–1
Filderstadt	Lindsay Davenport	Justine Henin	7–5, 6–4
Linz	Lindsay Davenport	Jelena Dokić	6–4, 6–1

=== 2002 ===
Tournament	Winner	Runner-up	Score
Sydney	Martina Hingis	Meghann Shaughnessy	6–2, 6–3
Paris	Venus Williams	Jelena Dokić	Walkover
Antwerp	Venus Williams	Justine Henin	6–3, 5–7, 6–3
Dubai	Amélie Mauresmo	Sandrine Testud	6–4, 7–6^{(7–3)}
Scottsdale	Serena Williams	Jennifer Capriati	6–2, 4–6, 6–4
Amelia Island	Venus Williams	Justine Henin	2–6, 7–5, 7–6^{(7–5)}
Hamburg	Kim Clijsters	Venus Williams	1–6, 6–3, 6–4
Eastbourne	Chanda Rubin	Anastasia Myskina	6–1, 6–3
Stanford	Venus Williams	Kim Clijsters	6–3, 6–3
San Diego	Venus Williams	Jelena Dokić	6–2, 6–2
Los Angeles	Chanda Rubin	Lindsay Davenport	5–7, 7–6^{(7–5)}, 6–3
New Haven	Venus Williams	Lindsay Davenport	7–5, 6–0
Bahia	Anastasia Myskina	Eleni Daniilidou	6–3, 0–6, 6–2
Tokyo (Toyota)	Serena Williams	Kim Clijsters	2–6, 6–3, 6–3
Leipzig	Serena Williams	Anastasia Myskina	6–3, 6–2
Filderstadt	Kim Clijsters	Daniela Hantuchová	4–6, 6–3, 6–4
Linz	Justine Henin	Alexandra Stevenson	6–3, 6–0

=== 2003 ===
Tournament	Winner	Runner-up	Score
Sydney	Kim Clijsters	Lindsay Davenport	6–7^{(5–7)}, 6–4, 7–5
Paris	Serena Williams	Amélie Mauresmo	6–3, 6–2
Antwerp	Venus Williams	Kim Clijsters	6–2, 6–4
Dubai	Justine Henin-Hardenne	Monica Seles	4–6, 7–6^{(7–4)}, 7–5
Scottsdale	Ai Sugiyama	Kim Clijsters	3–6, 7–5, 6–4
Amelia Island	Elena Dementieva	Lindsay Davenport	4–6, 7–5, 6–3
Warsaw	Amélie Mauresmo	Venus Williams	6–7^{(6–8)}, 6–0, 3–0 Ret.
Eastbourne	Chanda Rubin	Conchita Martínez	6–4, 3–6, 6–4
Stanford	Kim Clijsters	Jennifer Capriati	4–6, 6–4, 6–2
San Diego	Justine Henin-Hardenne	Kim Clijsters	3–6, 6–2, 6–3
Los Angeles	Kim Clijsters	Lindsay Davenport	6–1, 3–6, 6–1
New Haven	Jennifer Capriati	Lindsay Davenport	6–2, 4–0 Ret.
Shanghai	Elena Dementieva	Chanda Rubin	6–3, 7–6^{(8–6)}
Leipzig	Anastasia Myskina	Justine Henin-Hardenne	3–6, 6–3, 6–3
Filderstadt	Kim Clijsters	Justine Henin-Hardenne	5–7, 6–4, 6–2
Linz	Ai Sugiyama	Nadia Petrova	7–5, 6–4
Philadelphia	Amélie Mauresmo	Anastasia Myskina	5–7, 6–0, 6–2

=== 2004 ===
Tournament	Winner	Runner-up	Score
Sydney	Justine Henin-Hardenne	Amélie Mauresmo	6–4, 6–4
Paris	Kim Clijsters	Mary Pierce	6–2, 6–1
Antwerp	Kim Clijsters	Silvia Farina Elia	6–3, 6–0
Dubai	Justine Henin-Hardenne	Svetlana Kuznetsova	7–6^{(7–3)}, 6–3
Doha	Anastasia Myskina	Svetlana Kuznetsova	4–6, 6–4, 6–4
Amelia Island	Lindsay Davenport	Amélie Mauresmo	6–4, 6–4
Warsaw	Venus Williams	Svetlana Kuznetsova	6–1, 6–4
Eastbourne	Svetlana Kuznetsova	Daniela Hantuchová	2–6, 7–6^{(7–2)}, 6–4
Stanford	Lindsay Davenport	Venus Williams	7–6^{(7–4)}, 5–7, 7–6^{(7–4)}
Los Angeles	Lindsay Davenport	Serena Williams	6–1, 6–3
New Haven	Elena Bovina	Nathalie Dechy	6–2, 2–6, 7–5
Beijing	Serena Williams	Svetlana Kuznetsova	4–6, 7–5, 6–4
Stuttgart (Filderstadt)	Lindsay Davenport	Amélie Mauresmo	6–2, Ret.
Linz	Amélie Mauresmo	Elena Bovina	6–2, 6–0
Philadelphia	Amélie Mauresmo	Vera Zvonareva	3–6, 6–2, 6–2

=== 2005 ===
Tournament	Winner	Runner-up	Score
Sydney	Alicia Molik	Samantha Stosur	6–7^{(5–7)}, 6–4, 7–5
Paris	Dinara Safina	Amélie Mauresmo	6–4, 2–6, 6–3
Antwerp	Amélie Mauresmo	Venus Williams	4–6, 7–5, 6–4
Doha	Maria Sharapova	Alicia Molik	4–6, 6–1, 6–4
Dubai	Lindsay Davenport	Jelena Janković	7–5, 7–5
Amelia Island	Lindsay Davenport	Silvia Farina Elia	7–5, 7–5
Warsaw	Justine Henin-Hardenne	Svetlana Kuznetsova	3–6, 6–2, 7–5
Eastbourne	Kim Clijsters	Vera Dushevina	7–5, 6–0
Stanford	Kim Clijsters	Venus Williams	7–5, 6–2
Los Angeles	Kim Clijsters	Daniela Hantuchová	6–4, 6–1
New Haven	Lindsay Davenport	Amélie Mauresmo	6–4, 6–4
Beijing	Maria Kirilenko	Anna-Lena Grönefeld	6–3, 6–4
Luxembourg	Kim Clijsters	Anna-Lena Grönefeld	6–2, 6–4
Stuttgart	Lindsay Davenport	Amélie Mauresmo	6–2, 6–4
Linz	Nadia Petrova	Patty Schnyder	4–6, 6–3, 6–1
Philadelphia	Amélie Mauresmo	Elena Dementieva	7–5, 2–6, 7–5

=== 2006 ===
Tournament	Winner	Runner-up	Score
Sydney	Justine Henin-Hardenne	Francesca Schiavone	4–6, 4–6, 7–5
Paris	Amélie Mauresmo	Mary Pierce	6–1, 7–6^{(7–2)}
Antwerp	Amélie Mauresmo	Kim Clijsters	3–6, 6–3, 6–3
Dubai	Justine Henin-Hardenne	Maria Sharapova	7–5, 6–2
Doha	Nadia Petrova	Amélie Mauresmo	6–3, 7–5
Amelia Island	Nadia Petrova	Francesca Schiavone	6–4, 6–4
Warsaw	Kim Clijsters	Svetlana Kuznetsova	7–5, 6–2
Eastbourne	Justine Henin-Hardenne	Anastasia Myskina	4–6, 6–1, 7–6^{(7–5)}
Stanford	Kim Clijsters	Patty Schnyder	6–4, 6–2
Los Angeles	Elena Dementieva	Jelena Janković	6–3, 4–6, 6–4
New Haven	Justine Henin-Hardenne	Lindsay Davenport	6–1, 1–0 Ret.
Beijing	Svetlana Kuznetsova	Amélie Mauresmo	6–4, 6–0
Luxembourg	Alona Bondarenko	Francesca Schiavone	6–3, 6–2
Stuttgart	Nadia Petrova	Tatiana Golovin	6–3, 7–6^{(7–4)}
Linz	Maria Sharapova	Nadia Petrova	7–5, 6–2

=== 2007 ===
Tournament	Winner	Runner-up	Score
Sydney	Kim Clijsters	Jelena Janković	4–6, 7–6^{(7–1)}, 6–4
Paris	Nadia Petrova	Lucie Šafářová	4–6, 6–1, 6–4
Antwerp	Amélie Mauresmo	Kim Clijsters	6–4, 7–6^{(7–4)}
Dubai	Justine Henin	Amélie Mauresmo	6–4, 7–5
Doha	Justine Henin	Svetlana Kuznetsova	6–4, 6–2
Amelia Island	Tatiana Golovin	Nadia Petrova	6–2, 6–1
Warsaw	Justine Henin	Alona Bondarenko	6–1, 6–3
Eastbourne	Justine Henin	Amélie Mauresmo	7–5, 6–7^{(4–7)}, 7–6^{(7–2)}
Stanford	Anna Chakvetadze	Sania Mirza	6–3, 6–2
Los Angeles	Ana Ivanovic	Nadia Petrova	7–5, 6–4
New Haven	Svetlana Kuznetsova	Ágnes Szávay	4–6, 3–0 Ret.
Beijing	Ágnes Szávay	Jelena Janković	6–7^{(7–9)}, 7–5, 6–2
Luxembourg	Ana Ivanovic	Daniela Hantuchová	3–6, 6–4, 6–4
Stuttgart	Justine Henin	Tatiana Golovin	2–6, 6–2, 6–1
Linz	Daniela Hantuchová	Patty Schnyder	6–4, 6–2

=== 2008 ===
Tournament	Winner	Runner-up	Score
Sydney	Justine Henin	Svetlana Kuznetsova	4–6, 6–2, 6–4
Paris	Anna Chakvetadze	Ágnes Szávay	6–3, 2–6, 6–2
Antwerp	Justine Henin	Karin Knapp	6–3, 6–3
Dubai	Elena Dementieva	Svetlana Kuznetsova	4–6, 6–3, 6–2
Bangalore	Serena Williams	Patty Schnyder	7–5, 6–3
Amelia Island	Maria Sharapova	Dominika Cibulková	7–6^{(9–7)}, 6–3
Eastbourne	Agnieszka Radwańska	Nadia Petrova	6–4, 6–7^{(11–13)}, 6–4
Stanford	Aleksandra Wozniak	Marion Bartoli	7–5, 6–3
Los Angeles	Dinara Safina	Flavia Pennetta	6–4, 6–2
New Haven	Caroline Wozniacki	Anna Chakvetadze	3–6, 6–4, 6–1
Beijing	Jelena Janković	Svetlana Kuznetsova	6–3, 6–2
Stuttgart	Jelena Janković	Nadia Petrova	6–4, 6–3
Zurich	Venus Williams	Flavia Pennetta	6–4, 6–4
Linz	Ana Ivanovic	Vera Zvonareva	6–2, 6–1

== Singles Title Matrix ==
	1990	1991	1992	1993	1994	1995	1996	1997	1998	1999
Sydney	WTA Tier III			Capriati	Date	Sabatini	Seles	Hingis	Sánchez Vicario	Davenport
Tokyo (Pan Pacific)	Graf	Sabatini	Sabatini	WTA Tier I						
Paris	Not an event			Navratilova	Navratilova	Graf	Halard-Decugis	Hingis	Pierce	S. Williams
Essen/ Hanover	Not an event		Seles	Medvedeva	Novotná	Not an event	Majoli	Majoli	Schnyder	Novotná
Washington D.C.	Navratilova	Sánchez Vicario	Not an event							
Indian Wells/ Palm Springs	Navratilova	Navratilova	Seles	Fernández	Graf	Fernández	Graf	WTA Tier I		
Boca Raton/ Delray Beach	Sabatini	WTA Tier I		Graf	Graf	Graf	Not an event			
Amelia Island	Graf	Sabatini	Sabatini	Sánchez Vicario	Sánchez Vicario	Martínez	Spîrlea	Davenport	Pierce	Seles
Houston	WTA Tier III	Seles	Seles	Martínez	Hack	Graf	Not an event			
Barcelona/ Madrid	WTA Tier IV	WTA Tier III		Sánchez Vicario	Sánchez Vicario	Sánchez Vicario	Novotná	WTA Tier III		
Hamburg	Graf	Graf	Graf	Sánchez Vicario	Sánchez Vicario	Martínez	Sánchez Vicario	Majoli	Hingis	V. Williams
Eastbourne	Navratilova	Navratilova	McNeil	Navratilova	McGrath	Tauziat	Seles	Abandoned	Novotná	Zvereva
Oakland/ Stanford	Seles	Navratilova	Seles	Navratilova	Sánchez Vicario	Mag. Maleeva	Hingis	Hingis	Davenport	Davenport
San Diego	WTA Tier III			Graf	Graf	Martínez	Date	Hingis	Davenport	Hingis
Los Angeles	Seles	Seles	Navratilova	Navratilova	Frazier	Martínez	Davenport	Seles	Davenport	S. Williams
Stratton Mt./ Atlanta/ New Haven	WTA Tier III			Martínez	Martínez	Not an event		Davenport	Graf	V. Williams
Tokyo (Nichirei/ Princess)	Fernández	Seles	Seles	Coetzer	Sánchez Vicario	Pierce	Seles	Seles	Seles	Davenport
Filderstadt/ Stuttgart	Fernández	Huber	Navratilova	Pierce	Huber	Majoli	Hingis	Hingis	Testud	Hingis
Zurich	Graf	Graf	Graf	WTA Tier I						
Linz	ITF Women's Circuit	WTA Tier V		WTA Tier III					Novotná	Pierce
Leipzig	WTA Tier III			Graf	Novotná	Huber	Huber	Novotná	Graf	Tauziat
Brighton	Graf	Graf	Graf	Novotná	Novotná	Fernández	Not an event			
Chicago	WTA Tier I	Navratilova	Navratilova	Seles	Zvereva	Mag. Maleeva	Novotná	Davenport	Not an event	
Worcester	Graf	Not an event								
Philadelphia	Not an event	Seles	Graf	WTA Tier I			Novotná	Hingis	Graf	Davenport

	2000	2001	2002	2003	2004	2005	2006	2007	2008
Sydney	Mauresmo	Hingis	Hingis	Clijsters	Henin	Molik	Henin	Clijsters	Henin
Paris	Tauziat	Mauresmo	V. Williams	S. Williams	Clijsters	Safina	Mauresmo	Petrova	Chakvetadze
Hanover	S. Williams	Not an event							
Nice	Not an event	Mauresmo	Not an event						
Antwerp	Not an event		V. Williams	V. Williams	Clijsters	Mauresmo	Mauresmo	Mauresmo	Henin
Dubai	Not an event	Hingis	Mauresmo	Henin	Henin	Davenport	Henin	Henin	Dementieva
Doha	Not an event	WTA Tier III			Myskina	Sharapova	Petrova	Henin	WTA Tier I
Bangalore	Not an event			WTA Tier IV			WTA Tier III		S. Williams
Scottsdale	Abandoned	Davenport	S. Williams	Sugiyama	Not an event				
Amelia Island	Seles	Mauresmo	V. Williams	Dementieva	Davenport	Davenport	Petrova	Golovin	Sharapova
Hamburg	Hingis	V. Williams	Clijsters	Not an event					
Warsaw	WTA Tier IV	Not an event	WTA Tier III	Mauresmo	V. Williams	Henin	Clijsters	Henin	Not an event
Eastbourne	Halard-Decugis	Davenport	Rubin	Rubin	Kuznetsova	Clijsters	Henin	Henin	Radwańska
Stanford	V. Williams	Clijsters	V. Williams	Clijsters	Davenport	Clijsters	Clijsters	Chakvetadze	Wozniak
San Diego	V. Williams	V. Williams	V. Williams	Henin	WTA Tier I				Not an event
Los Angeles	S. Williams	Davenport	Rubin	Clijsters	Davenport	Clijsters	Dementieva	Ivanovic	Safina
New Haven	V. Williams	V. Williams	V. Williams	Capriati	Bovina	Davenport	Henin	Kuznetsova	Wozniacki
Bahia	WTA Tier IV	Seles	Myskina	Not an event					
Tokyo (Princess)	S. Williams	Dokić	S. Williams	Not an event					
Shanghai/ Beijing	WTA Tier IV			Dementieva	S. Williams	Kirilenko	Kuznetsova	Szávay	Janković
Luxembourg	WTA Tier III					Clijsters	Bondarenko	Ivanovic	WTA Tier III
Filderstadt/ Stuttgart	Hingis	Davenport	Clijsters	Clijsters	Davenport	Davenport	Petrova	Henin	Janković
Zurich	WTA Tier I								V. Williams
Linz	Davenport	Davenport	Henin	Sugiyama	Mauresmo	Petrova	Sharapova	Hantuchová	Ivanovic
Leipzig	Clijsters	Clijsters	S. Williams	Myskina	Not an event				
Philadelphia	Davenport	Not an event		Mauresmo	Mauresmo	Mauresmo	Not an event		
