= Kimberly Po =

American tennis player

- Full name: Kimberly Po-Messerli
- Country (sports): United States
- Residence: Rolling Hills, California, U.S.
- Born: October 20, 1971 (age 54) Los Angeles, California, U.S.
- Height: 5 ft 2 in (1.57 m)
- Turned pro: 1991
- Retired: 2002
- Plays: Right (two-handed backhand)
- Prize money: $1,926,618

Singles
- Career record: 200–180
- Career titles: 3 ITF
- Highest ranking: No. 14 (June 9, 1997)

Grand Slam singles results
- Australian Open: QF (1997)
- French Open: 3R (1993, 1997)
- Wimbledon: 2R (1992, 1994, 1996, 1998)
- US Open: 4R (1998)

Doubles
- Career record: 250–216
- Career titles: 5 WTA, 1 ITF
- Highest ranking: No. 6 (September 10, 2001)

Grand Slam doubles results
- Australian Open: 3R (2001)
- French Open: QF (2001)
- Wimbledon: SF (2001)
- US Open: F (2001)

Mixed doubles
- Career titles: 1

Grand Slam mixed doubles results
- Australian Open: QF (1999)
- French Open: QF (2000)
- Wimbledon: W (2000)
- US Open: F (1999)

Kimberly Po (born October 20, 1971) is a former professional tennis player from the United States.

In her career, she won the mixed doubles title at Wimbledon in 2000, partnering Donald Johnson. She also was a runner-up at the US Open in women's doubles in 2001, partnering Nathalie Tauziat, as well as at the 1999 US Open in mixed doubles, with Johnson. She has also been elected for the UCLA hall of fame in 2025

Po won six top-level doubles titles. Her career-high world rankings were world No. 6 in doubles (in 2001) and No. 14 in singles (in 1997). Her best singles performance at a Grand Slam event came at the 1997 Australian Open when she reached the quarterfinals before being knocked out by Amanda Coetzer.

Po married Oliver Messerli in 2001, and was known thereafter as Kimberly Po-Messerli.

== Grand Slam finals ==
=== Doubles: 1 (0–1) ===
Result	Year	Championship	Surface	Partner	Opponents	Score
Loss	2001	US Open	Hard	(France) Nathalie Tauziat	(United States) Lisa Raymond (Australia) Rennae Stubbs	6–2, 5–7, 7–5

=== Mixed: 2 (1–1) ===
Result	Year	Championship	Surface	Partner	Opponents	Score
Loss	1999	US Open	Hard	(United States) Donald Johnson	(Japan) Ai Sugiyama (India) Mahesh Bhupathi	6–4, 6–4
Win	2000	Wimbledon	Grass	(United States) Donald Johnson	(Belgium) Kim Clijsters (Australia) Lleyton Hewitt	6–4, 7–6^{(7–3)}

== WTA career finals ==
=== Doubles: 19 (5 titles, 14 runner-ups) ===
Legend
Grand Slam tournaments (0/1)
Tier I (1/1)
Tier II (1/6)
Tier III (3/6)
Tier IV & V (0/0)
Virginia Slims (0/0)

Result	No.	Date	Tournament	Surface	Partner	Opponents	Score
Loss	1.	Jan 1993	Brisbane	Hard	(United States) Shannan McCarthy	(Spain) Conchita Martínez (Latvia) Larisa Neiland	2–6, 2–6
Loss	2.	Feb 1993	Chicago	Carpet (i)	(United States) Amy Frazier	(United States) Katrina Adams (United States) Zina Garrison-Jackson	6–7^{(7–9)}, 3–6
Loss	3.	Apr 1996	Tokyo	Hard	(United States) Amy Frazier	(Japan) Kimiko Date (Japan) Ai Sugiyama	6–7^{(6–8)}, 7–6^{(8–6)}, 3–6
Loss	4.	Aug 1996	Los Angeles	Hard	(United States) Amy Frazier	(United States) Lindsay Davenport (Belarus) Natasha Zvereva	1–6, 4–6
Loss	5.	Oct 1996	Quebec City	Hard (i)	(United States) Amy Frazier	(United States) Debbie Graham (Netherlands) Brenda Schultz-McCarthy	1–6, 4–6
Loss	6.	Aug 1997	San Diego	Hard	(United States) Amy Frazier	(Switzerland) Martina Hingis (Spain) Arantxa Sánchez Vicario	3–6, 5–7
Win	1.	Sep 1998	Quebec City	Hard (i)	(United States) Lori McNeil	(United States) Chanda Rubin (France) Sandrine Testud	6–7^{(3–7)}, 7–5, 6–4
Win	2.	Apr 1999	Tokyo	Hard	(United States) Corina Morariu	(Australia) Kerry-Anne Guse (Australia) Catherine Barclay	6–3, 6–2
Win	3.	Feb 2000	Oklahoma City	Hard (i)	(United States) Corina Morariu	(Thailand) Tamarine Tanasugarn (Ukraine) Elena Tatarkova	6–4, 4–6, 6–2
Loss	7.	Aug 2000	Los Angeles	Hard	(France) Anne-Gaëlle Sidot	(Belgium) Els Callens (Belgium) Dominique Van Roost	2–6, 5–7
Loss	8.	Oct 2000	Zurich	Hard (i)	(France) Anne-Gaëlle Sidot	(Switzerland) Martina Hingis (Russia) Anna Kournikova	3–6, 4–6
Loss	9.	Nov 2000	Quebec City	Hard (i)	(Belgium) Els Callens	(United States) Meghann Shaughnessy (Australia) Nicole Pratt	3–6, 4–6
Loss	10.	Feb 2001	Paris	Carpet (i)	(France) Nathalie Tauziat	(Croatia) Iva Majoli (France) Virginie Razzano	3–6, 5–7
Loss	11.	Feb 2001	Nice	Carpet (i)	(France) Nathalie Tauziat	(France) Émilie Loit (France) Anne-Gaëlle Sidot	6–1, 2–6, 0–6
Loss	12.	Jun 2001	Birmingham	Grass	(France) Nathalie Tauziat	(Zimbabwe) Cara Black (Russia) Elena Likhovtseva	1–6, 2–6
Win	4.	Aug 2001	Los Angeles	Hard	(France) Nathalie Tauziat	(United States) Nicole Arendt (Netherlands) Caroline Vis	6–3, 7–5
Win	5.	Aug 2001	Toronto	Hard	(Australia) Nicole Pratt	(Slovenia) Tina Križan (Slovenia) Katarina Srebotnik	6–3, 6–1
Loss	13.	Aug 2001	US Open	Hard	(France) Nathalie Tauziat	(United States) Lisa Raymond (Australia) Rennae Stubbs	2–6, 7–5, 5–7
Loss	14.	Jun 2002	Birmingham	Grass	(France) Nathalie Tauziat	(Japan) Shinobu Asagoe (Belgium) Els Callens	4–6, 3–6

Awards
Preceded by (United States) Nicole Arendt	Karen Krantzcke Sportsmanship Award; 1994	Succeeded by (South Africa) Amanda Coetzer
