= 2000 Ericsson Open – Women's singles =

Women's singles
- 2000 Ericsson Open

Final
- Champion: (Switzerland) Martina Hingis
- Runner-up: (United States) Lindsay Davenport
- Score: 6–3, 6–2

Details
- Draw: 96 (8WC/8Q/1LL)
- Seeds: 32

Events
Singles	men	women
Doubles	men	women
- Miami Open

Martina Hingis defeated Lindsay Davenport in the final, 6–3, 6–2 to win the women's singles tennis title at the 2000 Miami Open. She did not lose a set, and lost only 21 games, en route to the title.

Venus Williams was the two-time defending champion, but did not participate this year due to a tendinitis.

== Seeds ==
A champion seed is indicated in bold text while text in italics indicates the round in which that seed was eliminated. All thirty-two seeds received a bye to the second round.

1. (Switzerland) **Martina Hingis (champion)**
2. (United States) Lindsay Davenport (final)
3. (France) Mary Pierce (second round)
4. (France) Nathalie Tauziat (third round)
5. (United States) Serena Williams (fourth round)
6. (Spain) Conchita Martínez (fourth round)
7. (United States) Monica Seles (semifinals)
8. (France) Julie Halard-Decugis (second round)
9. (Russia) Anna Kournikova (fourth round)
10. (Spain) Arantxa Sánchez Vicario (third round)
11. (Austria) Barbara Schett (second round)
12. (France) Sandrine Testud (semifinals)
13. (United States) Jennifer Capriati (quarterfinals)
14. (Germany) Anke Huber (third round)
15. (Russia) Elena Likhovtseva (fourth round)
16. (Belgium) Dominique Van Roost (third round, withdrew)
17. (Japan) Ai Sugiyama (third round)
18. (South Africa) Amanda Coetzer (quarterfinals)
19. (United States) Amy Frazier (quarterfinals)
20. (Romania) Ruxandra Dragomir (third round)
21. (France) Nathalie Dechy (fourth round)
22. (Croatia) Silvija Talaja (third round)
23. (Switzerland) Patty Schnyder (third round)
24. (United States) Chanda Rubin (third round)
25. (Belgium) Sabine Appelmans (fourth round)
26. (United States) Lisa Raymond (third round)
27. (Austria) Sylvia Plischke (third round)
28. (Belgium) Kim Clijsters (fourth round)
29. (France) Anne-Gaëlle Sidot (third round)
30. (United States) Corina Morariu (second round)
31. (Belarus) Natasha Zvereva (third round)
32. (France) Sarah Pitkowski (third round)

== Draw ==
Key

- Q = Qualifier
- WC = Wild card
- LL = Lucky loser
- Alt = Alternate
- ITF = ITF entry
- PR = Protected ranking
- SR = Special ranking
- SE = Special exempt
- JE = Junior exempt
- JR = Junior Accelerator Programme entrant
- CO = College Accelerator Programme entrant
- NG = Next Gen Accelerator Program entrant
- w/o = Walkover
- r = Retired
- d = Defaulted

=== Finals ===
Quarterfinals
1	(Switzerland) Martina Hingis	6	6
18	(South Africa) Amanda Coetzer	3	1
19	(United States) Amy Frazier	0	3
7	(United States) Monica Seles	6	6
13	(United States) Jennifer Capriati	3	4
12	(France) Sandrine Testud	6	6
(Russia) Nadia Petrova	2	1
2	(United States) Lindsay Davenport	6	6

Semifinals
1	(Switzerland) Martina Hingis	6	6
7	(United States) Monica Seles	0	0
12	(France) Sandrine Testud	1	7	6^{5}
2	(United States) Lindsay Davenport	6	6^{4}	7

Final
1	(Switzerland) Martina Hingis	6	6
2	(United States) Lindsay Davenport	3	2

=== Top half ===
==== Section 1 ====
First round
(Canada) M Drake	6	6
(Czech Republic) S Kleinová	3	2
(United States) K Brandi	6	6
WC	(United States) M Middleton	2	0
Q	(Russia) A Jidkova	3	3
(Thailand) T Tanasugarn	6	6
(Czech Republic) A Gerši	7	6
Q	(Czech Republic) L Němečková	5	1

Second round
1	(Switzerland) M Hingis	6	6
(Canada) M Drake	3	2
(United States) K Brandi	3	3
29	(France) A Sidot	6	6
28	(Belgium) K Clijsters	3	6	7
(Thailand) T Tanasugarn	6	3	5
(Czech Republic) A Gerši	7	4	6
11	(Austria) B Schett	6^{5}	6	1

Third round
1	(Switzerland) M Hingis	6	6
29	(France) A Sidot	0	3
28	(Belgium) K Clijsters	6	7
(Czech Republic) A Gerši	4	5

Fourth round
1	(Switzerland) M Hingis	6	6
28	(Belgium) K Clijsters	0	4

==== Section 2 ====
First round
WC	(United States) H Parkinson	4	6	7
(Poland) M Grzybowska	6	2	5
(Germany) M Weingärtner	3	0
WC	(Czech Republic) D Bedáňová	6	6
(Hungary) R Kuti-Kis	4	6	6
(Germany) A Glass	6	0	1
(Australia) J Dokić	6	6
Q	(Japan) N Miyagi	3	2

Second round
16	(Belgium) D Van Roost	6^{7}	6	6
WC	(United States) H Parkinson	7	1	0
WC	(Czech Republic) D Bedáňová	6	2	3
18	(South Africa) A Coetzer	4	6	6
23	(Switzerland) P Schnyder	7	7
(Hungary) R Kuti-Kis	6^{4}	5
(Australia) J Dokić	4	6	3
6	(Spain) C Martínez	6	3	6

Third round
16	(Belgium) D Van Roost
18	(South Africa) A Coetzer	w/o
23	(Switzerland) P Schnyder	5	4
6	(Spain) C Martínez	7	6

Fourth round
18	(South Africa) A Coetzer	6	6
6	(Spain) C Martínez	1	2

==== Section 3 ====
First round
(Belarus) O Barabanschikova	3	4
(United States) T Snyder	6	6
(South Africa) J Kruger	7	5	1
(Slovakia) K Habšudová	6^{5}	7	6
(Canada) S Jeyaseelan	2	6	2
(Spain) Á Montolio	6	3	6
Q	(Belarus) T Poutchek	6	6
(Netherlands) K Boogert	1	2

Second round
4	(France) N Tauziat	6	2	7
(United States) T Snyder	3	6	6^{6}
(Slovakia) K Habšudová	1	1
21	(France) N Dechy	6	6
19	(United States) A Frazier	6	6
(Spain) Á Montolio	3	1
Q	(Belarus) T Poutchek	2	2
14	(Germany) A Huber	6	6

Third round
4	(France) N Tauziat	4	2
21	(France) N Dechy	6	6
19	(United States) A Frazier	5	6	6
14	(Germany) A Huber	7	4	3

Fourth round
21	(France) N Dechy	3	5
19	(United States) A Frazier	6	7

==== Section 4 ====
First round
(Bulgaria) L Bacheva	5	4
WC	(United States) J Hopkins	7	6
(Slovenia) K Srebotnik	5	1
(Romania) I Spîrlea	7	6
(Czech Republic) D Chládková	6	7
Q	(Romania) C Cristea	3	5
WC	(United States) M Washington	3	6	1
(United States) L Osterloh	6	4	6

Second round
9	(Russia) A Kournikova	6	6
WC	(United States) J Hopkins	2	4
(Romania) I Spîrlea	3	4
31	(Belarus) N Zvereva	6	6
26	(United States) L Raymond	7	6
(Czech Republic) D Chládková	5	3
(United States) L Osterloh	2	1
7	(United States) M Seles	6	6

Third round
9	(Russia) A Kournikova	6	6
31	(Belarus) N Zvereva	1	4
26	(United States) L Raymond	3	2
7	(United States) M Seles	6	6

Fourth round
9	(Russia) A Kournikova	1	6	0
7	(United States) M Seles	6	3	6

=== Bottom half ===
==== Section 5 ====
First round
(Italy) R Grande	6^{4}	4
(Bulgaria) M Maleeva	7	6
(United States) E deLone	6	6
(Austria) P Wartusch	3	2
(France) A Cocheteux	3	6	7
(Argentina) P Suárez	6	4	5
WC	(United States) B Rippner	6	6^{4}	6
Q	(Belgium) E Callens	4	7	2

Second round
5	(United States) S Williams	6	6
(Bulgaria) M Maleeva	4	2
(United States) E deLone	2	6^{5}
17	(Japan) A Sugiyama	6	7
24	(United States) C Rubin	6	6
(France) A Cocheteux	2	2
WC	(United States) B Rippner	5	1
13	(United States) J Capriati	7	6

Third round
5	(United States) S Williams	6	6
17	(Japan) A Sugiyama	3	0
24	(United States) C Rubin	1	3
13	(United States) J Capriati	6	6

Fourth round
5	(United States) S Williams	6^{2}	6	3
13	(United States) J Capriati	7	1	6

==== Section 6 ====
First round
(Colombia) F Zuluaga	7	7
WC	(Croatia) I Majoli	6^{5}	5
LL	(Canada) J Nejedly	6	4	0
(Australia) N Pratt	3	6	6
(Zimbabwe) C Black	7	6
(Sweden) Å Carlsson	5	3
(Russia) E Dementieva	5	6	6
WC	(Slovakia) D Hantuchová	7	3	2

Second round
12	(France) S Testud	6	3	7
(Colombia) F Zuluaga	4	6	6^{9}
(Australia) N Pratt	5	5
27	(Austria) S Plischke	7	7
32	(France) S Pitkowski	6	6
(Zimbabwe) C Black	2	0
(Russia) E Dementieva	6	2
3	(France) M Pierce	3	1^{r}

Third round
12	(France) S Testud	6	6
27	(Austria) S Plischke	0	0
32	(France) S Pitkowski	2	2
(Russia) E Dementieva	6	6

Fourth round
12	(France) S Testud	5	6	6
(Russia) E Dementieva	7	4	4

==== Section 7 ====
First round
(Spain) M Serna	7	1	5
(Russia) N Petrova	6^{5}	6	7
(Russia) A Myskina	4	7	6
(United States) A Stevenson	6	5	4
(Italy) S Farina	6	7
(Spain) G León García	2	5
Q	(Canada) V Webb	6^{2}	1
(Spain) C Torrens Valero	7	6

Second round
8	(France) J Halard-Decugis	2	3
(Russia) N Petrova	6	6
(Russia) A Myskina	6	6
30	(United States) C Morariu	4	4
25	(Belgium) S Appelmans	7	6
(Italy) S Farina	6^{2}	3
(Spain) C Torrens Valero	6^{7}	2
10	(Spain) A Sánchez Vicario	7	6

Third round
(Russia) N Petrova	6	4	6
(Russia) A Myskina	1	6	0
25	(Belgium) S Appelmans	6	7
10	(Spain) A Sánchez Vicario	3	5

Fourth round
(Russia) N Petrova	6	6
25	(Belgium) S Appelmans	3	2

==== Section 8 ====
First round
Q	(Argentina) F Labat	2	3
(Spain) MA Sánchez Lorenzo	6	6
(Switzerland) E Gagliardi	4	2
(Russia) T Panova	6	6
(Israel) A Smashnova	4	1
(Slovenia) T Pisnik	6	6
(Croatia) M Lučić	6^{3}	2
(Luxembourg) A Kremer	7	6

Second round
15	(Russia) E Likhovtseva	6	6
(Spain) MA Sánchez Lorenzo	4	1
(Russia) T Panova	6	1	2
20	(Romania) R Dragomir	2	6	6
22	(Croatia) S Talaja	6	3	6
(Slovenia) T Pisnik	1	6	1
(Luxembourg) A Kremer	1	2
2	(United States) L Davenport	6	6

Third round
15	(Russia) E Likhovtseva	6	2	7
20	(Romania) R Dragomir	4	6	6^{5}
22	(Croatia) S Talaja	4	4
2	(United States) L Davenport	6	6

Fourth round
15	(Russia) E Likhovtseva	2	1
2	(United States) L Davenport	6	6

== Qualifying ==
=== Qualifying seeds ===
1. (Canada) Jana Nejedly (qualifying competition, lucky loser)
2. (United States) Meghann Shaughnessy (first round)
3. (United States) Marissa Irvin (first round)
4. (Italy) Tathiana Garbin (first round)
5. (Belgium) Els Callens (qualified)
6. (Croatia) Jelena Kostanić (second round)
7. (Belgium) Laurence Courtois (second round)
8. (Argentina) Florencia Labat (qualified)
9. (Federal Republic of Yugoslavia) Sandra Načuk (second round)
10. (Netherlands) Seda Noorlander (second round)
11. (Netherlands) Amanda Hopmans (second round)
12. (Venezuela) María Vento-Kabchi (qualifying competition)
13. (Russia) Alina Jidkova (qualified)
14. (Netherlands) Miriam Oremans (first round)
15. (Switzerland) Miroslava Vavrinec (first round)
16. (Argentina) Mariana Díaz Oliva (qualifying competition)

=== Qualifiers ===
1. (Japan) Nana Miyagi
2. (Czech Republic) Lenka Němečková
3. (Romania) Cătălina Cristea
4. (Canada) Vanessa Webb
5. (Argentina) Florencia Labat
6. (Belarus) Tatiana Poutchek
7. (Belgium) Els Callens
8. (Russia) Alina Jidkova

=== Lucky loser ===
1. (Canada) Jana Nejedly

=== Qualifying draw ===
==== First qualifier ====
First round
1	(Canada) Jana Nejedly	6	6
(Slovakia) Ľudmila Cervanová	3	4
(Australia) Alicia Molik	6	6^{3}	6
(Spain) Virginia Ruano Pascual	2	7^{7}	1
WC	(United States) Ashley Harkleroad	4	3
(Japan) Nana Miyagi	6	6
(Australia) Lisa McShea	1	3
10	(Netherlands) Seda Noorlander	6	6

Second round
1	(Canada) Jana Nejedly	6	7
(Australia) Alicia Molik	4	5
(Japan) Nana Miyagi	1	7^{7}	7
10	(Netherlands) Seda Noorlander	6	6^{3}	5

Qualifying competition
1	(Canada) Jana Nejedly	2	1
(Japan) Nana Miyagi	6	6

==== Second qualifier ====
First round
16	(Argentina) Mariana Díaz Oliva	6	6
WC	(Argentina) Clarisa Fernández	4	4
(Japan) Shinobu Asagoe	6	6
(Italy) Francesca Lubiani	4	4
(Czech Republic) Lenka Němečková	6	2	7^{7}
WC	(Spain) María José Martínez Sánchez	3	6	6^{5}
(Israel) Hila Rosen	1	2
7	(Belgium) Laurence Courtois	6	6

Second round
16	(Argentina) Mariana Díaz Oliva	6	7
(Japan) Shinobu Asagoe	2	5
(Czech Republic) Lenka Němečková	6	6
7	(Belgium) Laurence Courtois	1	3

Qualifying competition
16	(Argentina) Mariana Díaz Oliva	1	4
(Czech Republic) Lenka Němečková	6	6

==== Third qualifier ====
First round
4	(Italy) Tathiana Garbin	4	6^{5}
(United States) Samantha Reeves	6	7^{7}
WC	(United States) Bethanie Mattek	1	2
(Germany) Anca Barna	6	6
(Romania) Cătălina Cristea	7^{7}	3	6
(Bulgaria) Pavlina Nola	6^{3}	6	2
WC	(United States) Candice Fuchs	0	1
11	(Netherlands) Amanda Hopmans	6	6

Second round
(United States) Samantha Reeves	1	3
(Germany) Anca Barna	6	6
(Romania) Cătălina Cristea	6	1	6
11	(Netherlands) Amanda Hopmans	1	6	3

Qualifying competition
(Germany) Anca Barna	2	6^{5}
(Romania) Cătălina Cristea	6	7^{7}

==== Fourth qualifier ====
First round
14	(Netherlands) Miriam Oremans	4	3
(Austria) Karin Kschwendt	6	6
(Hungary) Katalin Marosi	6	6
(France) Laurence Andretto	4	2
(Canada) Vanessa Webb	6	4	6
(Japan) Yuka Yoshida	3	6	4
(Spain) Nuria Llagostera Vives	7	5	0
8	(Croatia) Jelena Kostanić	5	7	6

Second round
(Austria) Karin Kschwendt	1	3
(Hungary) Katalin Marosi	6	6
(Canada) Vanessa Webb	6	4	6
8	(Croatia) Jelena Kostanić	2	6	3

Qualifying competition
(Hungary) Katalin Marosi	7	5	3
(Canada) Vanessa Webb	5	7	6

==== Fifth qualifier ====
First round
8	(Argentina) Florencia Labat	6	6
Alt	(South Africa) Surina De Beer	0	3
(United Kingdom) Julie Pullin	6	6
(Australia) Evie Dominikovic	4	3
(Italy) Giulia Casoni	3	6^{3}
(United States) Janet Lee	6	7^{7}
WC	(France) Karolina Jagieniak	1	6	6
15	(Switzerland) Miroslava Vavrinec	6	3	4

Second round
8	(Argentina) Florencia Labat	6	6
(United Kingdom) Julie Pullin	2	2
(United States) Janet Lee	6	6
WC	(France) Karolina Jagieniak	1	4

Qualifying competition
8	(Argentina) Florencia Labat	7^{7}	6
(United States) Janet Lee	6^{1}	2

==== Sixth qualifier ====
First round
9	(Federal Republic of Yugoslavia) Sandra Načuk	6	6
(United Kingdom) Louise Latimer	1	2
(Belarus) Tatiana Poutchek	6	6
(Slovenia) Tina Križan	4	2
WC	(United States) Ansley Cargill	4	6	6
(Kazakhstan) Irina Selyutina	6	4	4
(Italy) Francesca Schiavone	7^{7}	2	6
3	(United States) Marissa Irvin	6^{4}	6	1

Second round
9	(Federal Republic of Yugoslavia) Sandra Načuk	4	2
(Belarus) Tatiana Poutchek	6	6
WC	(United States) Ansley Cargill	6	3	4
(Italy) Francesca Schiavone	4	6	6

Qualifying competition
(Belarus) Tatiana Poutchek	6	7^{7}
(Italy) Francesca Schiavone	0	6^{4}

==== Seventh qualifier ====
First round
5	(Belgium) Els Callens	6	6
(United States) Jolene Watanabe	0	1
(Italy) Adriana Serra Zanetti	3	6	6
(Spain) Rosa María Andrés Rodríguez	6	0	4
(United States) Meilen Tu	6	6^{4}	6
WC	(United States) Sandra Cacic	2	7^{7}	2
(Mexico) Angélica Gavaldón	6^{6}	4
12	(Venezuela) María Vento-Kabchi	7^{8}	6

Second round
5	(Belgium) Els Callens	6	4	6
(Italy) Adriana Serra Zanetti	3	6	4
(United States) Meilen Tu	6^{4}	3
12	(Venezuela) María Vento-Kabchi	7^{7}	6

Qualifying competition
5	(Belgium) Els Callens	6	7
12	(Venezuela) María Vento-Kabchi	4	5

==== Eighth qualifier ====
First round
13	(Russia) Alina Jidkova	3	6	6
(Germany) Julia Abe	6	4	2
(Germany) Angelika Bachmann	2	4
(Australia) Annabel Ellwood	6	6
(Germany) Elena Wagner	6	6
(Slovakia) Martina Suchá	1	1
(Russia) Lina Krasnoroutskaya	6	6
2	(United States) Meghann Shaughnessy	4	2

Second round
13	(Russia) Alina Jidkova	3	7^{12}	6
(Australia) Annabel Ellwood	6	6^{10}	3
(Germany) Elena Wagner	2	2
(Russia) Lina Krasnoroutskaya	6	6

Qualifying competition
13	(Russia) Alina Jidkova	7^{7}	6
(Russia) Lina Krasnoroutskaya	6^{2}	4
