= 2001 ANZ Tasmanian International – Doubles =

Doubles
- 2001 ANZ Tasmanian International

Final
- Champions: (Zimbabwe) Cara Black (Russia) Elena Likhovtseva
- Runners-up: (Romania) Ruxandra Dragomir (Spain) Virginia Ruano Pascual
- Score: 6–4, 6–1

Events
Singles	Doubles
← 2000 ·	ANZ Tasmanian International	· 2002 →

Rita Grande and Émilie Loit were the defending champions but only Grande competed that year with Emmanuelle Gagliardi.

Gagliardi and Grande lost in the quarterfinals to Els Callens and Anne-Gaëlle Sidot.

Cara Black and Elena Likhovtseva won in the final 6–4, 6–1 against Ruxandra Dragomir and Virginia Ruano Pascual.

== Seeds ==
Champion seeds are indicated in bold text while text in italics indicates the round in which those seeds were eliminated.

1. (Zimbabwe) **Cara Black** / (Russia) **Elena Likhovtseva (champions)**
2. (Belgium) Els Callens / (France) Anne-Gaëlle Sidot (semifinals)
3. (Romania) Ruxandra Dragomir / (Spain) Virginia Ruano Pascual (final)
4. (United States) Amy Frazier / (United States) Katie Schlukebir (quarterfinals)

== Draw ==
=== Key ===
- Q = Qualifier
- WC = Wild card
- LL = Lucky loser
- Alt = Alternate
- SE = Special exempt
- PR = Protected ranking
- ITF = ITF entry
- JE = Junior exempt
- w/o = Walkover
- r = Retired
- d = Defaulted
- SR = Special ranking

First round
1	(Zimbabwe) **C Black** (Russia) **E Likhovtseva**	**6**	**6**
(Hungary) K Marosi-Aracama (Uzbekistan) I Tulyaganova	2	3
Q	(Japan) **R Fujiwara** (France) **S Pitkowski**	0	**7^{7}**	**6**
(South Africa) K Grant (United States) H Parkinson	**6**	6^{5}	2
4	(United States) **A Frazier** (United States) **K Schlukebir**	**6**	**6**
WC	(United States) A Augustus (Australia) A Jensen	2	1
(Russia) **A Jidkova** (Belarus) **T Poutchek**	**6**	**7**
LL	(United States) K Brandi (Paraguay) R de los Ríos	3	5
(Australia) **R McQuillan** (Australia) **C Wheeler**	**6**	**6**
(United States) J Hopkins (Germany) C Schneider	2	0
(Japan) M Inoue (Japan) S Obata	3	2
3	(Romania) **R Dragomir** (Spain) **V Ruano Pascual**	**6**	**6**
(Switzerland) **E Gagliardi** (Italy) **R Grande**	**6**	**6**
(Netherlands) Y Basting (Netherlands) A Hopmans	3	3
(Spain) N Llagostera (Spain) M Ramón	5	**6**	2
2	(Belgium) **E Callens** (France) **A-G Sidot**	**7**	2	**6**

Quarterfinals
1	(Zimbabwe) **C Black** (Russia) **E Likhovtseva**	**6**	**6**
Q	(Japan) R Fujiwara (France) S Pitkowski	4	2
4	(United States) A Frazier (United States) K Schlukebir	1	5
(Russia) **A Jidkova** (Belarus) **T Poutchek**	**6**	**7**
(Australia) R McQuillan (Australia) C Wheeler	2	**6**	3
3	(Romania) **R Dragomir** (Spain) **V Ruano Pascual**	**6**	1	**6**
(Switzerland) E Gagliardi (Italy) R Grande	6^{3}	5	r
2	(Belgium) **E Callens** (France) **A-G Sidot**	**7^{7}**	**5**

Semifinals
1	(Zimbabwe) **C Black** (Russia) **E Likhovtseva**	**6**	**6**
(Russia) A Jidkova (Belarus) T Poutchek	2	4
3	(Romania) **R Dragomir** (Spain) **V Ruano Pascual**	2	**6**	**7**
2	(Belgium) E Callens (France) A-G Sidot	**6**	3	5

Final
1	(Zimbabwe) **Cara Black** (Russia) **Elena Likhovtseva**	**6**	**6**
3	(Romania) Ruxandra Dragomir (Spain) Virginia Ruano Pascual	4	1

== Qualifying ==
=== Seeds ===
Both seeded teams received byes to the second round.

1. (Japan) **Rika Fujiwara** / (France) **Sarah Pitkowski (Qualifiers)**
2. (Spain) Marta Marrero / (Spain) Anabel Medina Garrigues (second round)

=== Qualifiers ===
1. **(Japan) Rika Fujiwara / (France) Sarah Pitkowski**

=== Lucky losers ===
1. **(United States) Kristina Brandi / (Paraguay) Rossana de los Ríos**

==== Draw ====
- NB: The first two rounds used the pro set format.

First round		Second round			Final round
		1	(Japan) **Rika Fujiwara** (France) **Sarah Pitkowski**	**8**
			(Australia) Melissa Dowse (Australia) Cindy Watson	6
					1	(Japan) **Rika Fujiwara** (France) **Sarah Pitkowski**	**7^{7}**	**6**
(United States) **Kristina Brandi** (Paraguay) **Rossana de los Ríos**	**8**					(United States) Kristina Brandi (Paraguay) Rossana de los Ríos	6^{5}	4
(Canada) Jana Nejedly (Switzerland) Miroslava Vavrinec	5		(United States) **Kristina Brandi** (Paraguay) **Rossana de los Ríos**	**8**
		2	(Spain) Marta Marrero (Spain) Anabel Medina Garrigues	6
