= 2001 ANZ Tasmanian International – Singles =

Singles
- 2001 ANZ Tasmanian International

Final
- Champion: (Italy) Rita Grande
- Runner-up: (United States) Jennifer Hopkins
- Score: 0–6, 6–3, 6–3

Details
- Draw: 32
- Seeds: 8

Events
Singles	Doubles
← 2000 ·	ANZ Tasmanian International	· 2002 →

Kim Clijsters was the defending champion but did not compete that year.

Rita Grande won in the final 0–6, 6–3, 6–3 against Jennifer Hopkins.

== Seeds ==
A champion seed is indicated in bold text while text in italics indicates the round in which that seed was eliminated.

1. (United States) Amy Frazier (quarterfinals)
2. (Russia) Elena Likhovtseva (quarterfinals)
3. (United States) Kristina Brandi (quarterfinals)
4. (France) Anne-Gaëlle Sidot (quarterfinals)
5. (Zimbabwe) Cara Black (semifinals)
6. (Romania) Ruxandra Dragomir (semifinals)
7. (Israel) Anna Smashnova (second round)
8. (France) Sarah Pitkowski (first round)

== Draw ==
=== Key ===
- Q = Qualifier
- WC = Wild card
- LL = Lucky loser
- Alt = Alternate
- SE = Special exempt
- PR = Protected ranking
- ITF = ITF entry
- JE = Junior exempt
- w/o = Walkover
- r = Retired
- d = Defaulted
- SR = Special ranking

First round
1	(United States) **A Frazier**	**6**	**6**
(Germany) M Weingärtner	3	4
(Switzerland) **M Vavrinec**	**6**	**7^{7}**
(Russia) A Jidkova	2	6^{4}
WC	(Australia) R McQuillan	2	2
(Italy) **R Grande**	**6**	**6**
Q	(Japan) S Obata	6^{13}	2
7	(Israel) **A Smashnova**	**7^{15}**	**6**
4	(France) **A-G Sidot**	**6**	**7**
LL	(Netherlands) A Hopmans	2	5
(Bulgaria) **P Nola**	**6**	**6**
(Poland) M Grzybowska	2	4
Q	(Spain) A Medina Garrigues	5	**6**	4
(Paraguay) **R de los Ríos**	**7**	4	**6**
(Belarus) O Barabanschikova	3	2
6	(Romania) **R Dragomir**	**6**	**6**
8	(France) S Pitkowski	**6**	4	2
Q	(France) **S Foretz**	4	**6**	**6**
WC	(Australia) L McShea	1	4
(United States) **J Hopkins**	**6**	**6**
(Spain) V Ruano Pascual	4	6^{4}
(Belarus) **T Poutchek**	**6**	**7^{7}**
(Uzbekistan) I Tulyaganova	1	2
3	(United States) **K Brandi**	**6**	**6**
5	(Zimbabwe) **C Black**	**7**	**6**
(Spain) M Marrero	5	0
(Austria) P Wartusch	3	4
Q	(Slovenia) **K Srebotnik**	**6**	**6**
(Canada) J Nejedly	2	3
(United States) **H Parkinson**	**6**	**6**
(Hungary) K Marosi-Aracama	1	5
2	(Russia) **E Likhovtseva**	**6**	**7**

Second round
1	(United States) **A Frazier**	**7^{7}**	**7**
(Switzerland) M Vavrinec	6^{3}	5
(Italy) **R Grande**	5	**6**	**7**
7	(Israel) A Smashnova	**7**	3	5
4	(France) **A-G Sidot**	**6**	**6**
(Bulgaria) P Nola	3	1
(Paraguay) R de los Ríos	5	3
6	(Romania) **R Dragomir**	**7**	**6**
Q	(France) S Foretz	3	2
(United States) **J Hopkins**	**6**	**6**
(Belarus) T Poutchek	2	6^{5}
3	(United States) **K Brandi**	**6**	**7^{7}**
5	(Zimbabwe) **C Black**	**6**	**7**
Q	(Slovenia) K Srebotnik	2	5
(United States) H Parkinson	4	2
2	(Russia) **E Likhovtseva**	**6**	**6**

Quarterfinals
1	(United States) A Frazier	4	3
(Italy) **R Grande**	**6**	**6**
4	(France) A-G Sidot	1	**7**	3
6	(Romania) **R Dragomir**	**6**	5	**6**
(United States) **J Hopkins**	**3**
3	(United States) K Brandi	1	r
5	(Zimbabwe) **C Black**	1	**6**	**6**
2	(Russia) E Likhovtseva	**6**	4	4

Semifinals
(Italy) **R Grande**	**6**	**6**
6	(Romania) R Dragomir	1	3
(United States) **J Hopkins**	**6**	**6**
5	(Zimbabwe) C Black	3	4

Final
(Italy) **Rita Grande**	0	**6**	**6**
(United States) Jennifer Hopkins	**6**	3	3

== Qualifying ==
=== Seeds ===
1. (Belgium) Els Callens (first round)
2. (Netherlands) Amanda Hopmans (final round)
3. (Netherlands) Yvette Basting (final round)
4. (Spain) **Anabel Medina Garrigues (Qualifier)**

=== Qualifiers ===
1. **(Japan) Saori Obata**
2. **(Slovenia) Katarina Srebotnik**
3. **(France) Stéphanie Foretz**
4. **(Spain) Anabel Medina Garrigues**

== Draw ==
=== First qualifier ===
First round
1	(Belgium) Els Callens	2	4
(France) **Laurence Andretto**	**6**	**6**
WC	(Australia) Cindy Watson	4	3
(Japan) **Saori Obata**	**6**	**6**

Final Round
(France) Laurence Andretto	1	5
(Japan) **Saori Obata**	**6**	**7**

=== Second qualifier ===
First round
2	(Netherlands) **Amanda Hopmans**	**7^{7}**	4	**7^{7}**
(Australia) Christina Wheeler	6^{2}	**6**	6^{4}
(Spain) Mariam Ramón Climent	5	2
(Slovenia) **Katarina Srebotnik**	**7**	**6**

Final Round
2	(Netherlands) Amanda Hopmans	**6**	2	1
(Slovenia) **Katarina Srebotnik**	2	**6**	**6**

=== Third qualifier ===
First round
3	(Netherlands) **Yvette Basting**	**6**	**6**
(Romania) Cătălina Cristea	3	3
(Spain) Nuria Llagostera	5	1
(France) **Stéphanie Foretz**	**7**	**6**

Final Round
3	(Netherlands) Yvette Basting	4	4
(France) **Stéphanie Foretz**	**6**	**6**

=== Fourth qualifier ===
First round
4	(Spain) **Anabel Medina Garrigues**	2	**6**	**6**
(Venezuela) Milagros Sequera	**6**	3	1
(Bulgaria) Antoaneta Pandjerova	3	1
WC	(Australia) **Melissa Dowse**	**6**	**6**

Final Round
4	(Spain) **Anabel Medina Garrigues**	**7^{7}**	**6**
WC	(Australia) Melissa Dowse	6^{5}	3
