= 2000 ANZ Tasmanian International – Singles =

Singles
- 2000 ANZ Tasmanian International

Final
- Champion: (Belgium) Kim Clijsters
- Runner-up: (United States) Chanda Rubin
- Score: 2–6, 6–2, 6–2

Details
- Draw: 32
- Seeds: 8

Events
Singles	Doubles
← 1999 ·	Hobart International	· 2001 →

Chanda Rubin was the defending champion, but lost in the final to Kim Clijsters who won by 2–6, 6–2, 6–2 score.

== Seeds ==
1. (United States) Amy Frazier (semifinals)
2. (Romania) Ruxandra Dragomir (first round)
3. (Switzerland) Patty Schnyder (second round)
4. (United States) Chanda Rubin (final)
5. (France) Nathalie Dechy (first round, retired)
6. (Slovakia) Henrieta Nagyová (first round)
7. (Austria) Sylvia Plischke (second round)
8. (France) Sarah Pitkowski (quarterfinals)

== Draw ==
=== Key ===
- Q = Qualifier
- WC = Wild card
- LL = Lucky loser
- Alt = Alternate
- ITF = ITF entry
- PR = Protected ranking
- SR = Special ranking
- SE = Special exempt
- JE = Junior exempt
- JR = Junior Accelerator Programme entrant
- CO = College Accelerator Programme entrant
- NG = Next Gen Accelerator Program entrant
- w/o = Walkover
- r = Retired
- d = Defaulted

=== Finals ===
Semifinals
1	(United States) Amy Frazier	2	1
4	(United States) Chanda Rubin	6	6
(Venezuela) María Vento	3	2
(Belgium) Kim Clijsters	6	6

Final
4	(United States) Chanda Rubin	6	2	2
(Belgium) Kim Clijsters	2	6	6

=== Top half ===
First round
1	(United States) A Frazier	6	6
(Russia) T Panova	4	4
(United States) H Parkinson	6	6
(Spain) C Torrens Valero	3	2
(Spain) G León García	3	7^{7}	6
(Australia) A Molik	6	6^{3}	2
(Romania) C Cristea	2	2
5	(France) N Dechy	6	3^{r}
4	(United States) C Rubin	6	6^{3}	6
(Australia) N Pratt	2	7^{7}	3
(Zimbabwe) C Black	3	7	6
(Spain) M Sánchez Lorenzo	6	5	2
(Belgium) J Henin	6	4	6
(Colombia) F Zuluaga	4	6	2
(Czech Republic) K Hrdličková	2	3
7	(Austria) S Plischke	6	6

Second round
1	(United States) A Frazier	3	6	6
(United States) H Parkinson	6	0	4
(Spain) G León García	6^{4}	5
(Romania) C Cristea	7^{7}	7
4	(United States) C Rubin	3	7	6
(Zimbabwe) C Black	6	5	3
(Belgium) J Henin	6	6
7	(Austria) S Plischke	3	1

Quarterfinals
1	(United States) A Frazier	6	5	6
(Romania) C Cristea	3	7	3
4	(United States) C Rubin	7	0	6
(Belgium) J Henin	5	6	2

Semifinals
1	(United States) A Frazier	2	1
4	(United States) C Rubin	6	6

=== Bottom half ===
First round
6	(Slovakia) H Nagyová	6^{4}	6	2
(United States) K Brandi	7^{7}	3	6
(Canada) M Drake	6	6^{3}	7^{10}
(Bulgaria) Mg Maleeva	4	7^{7}	6^{8}
(Venezuela) M Vento	6	7
(Italy) R Grande	3	5
(Spain) Á Montolio	3	3
3	(Switzerland) P Schnyder	6	6
8	(France) S Pitkowski	4	6	6
(Austria) B Schwartz	6	4	1
(Israel) A Smashnova	2	7	6
(France) A Cocheteux	6	5	1
WC	(Australia) A Ellwood	4	4
LL	(Netherlands) M Oremans	6	6
(Belgium) K Clijsters	4	6	6
2	(Romania) R Dragomir	6	1	2

Second round
(United States) K Brandi	4	2
(Canada) M Drake	6	6
(Venezuela) M Vento	7^{8}	6
3	(Switzerland) P Schnyder	6^{6}	4
8	(France) S Pitkowski	4	7	7
(Israel) A Smashnova	6	5	5
LL	(Netherlands) M Oremans	2	4
(Belgium) K Clijsters	6	6

Quarterfinals
(Canada) M Drake	3	2
(Venezuela) M Vento	6	6
8	(France) S Pitkowski	5	1
(Belgium) K Clijsters	7	6

Semifinals
(Venezuela) M Vento	3	2
(Belgium) K Clijsters	6	6
