= 1999 ANZ Tasmanian International – Singles =

Singles
- 1999 ANZ Tasmanian International

Final
- Champion: (United States) Chanda Rubin
- Runner-up: (Italy) Rita Grande
- Score: 6–2, 6–3

Details
- Draw: 32
- Seeds: 8

Events
Singles	Doubles
← 1998 ·	ANZ Tasmanian International	· 2000 →

The 1999 ANZ Tasmanian International singles was the singles event of the sixth edition of the ANZ Tasmanian International. Patty Schnyder was the reigning champion but did not compete that year.

Chanda Rubin won in the final 6–2, 6–3 against Rita Grande.

== Seeds ==
1. (France) Julie Halard-Decugis (semifinals, withdrew)
2. (United States) Corina Morariu (first round, retired)
3. (Spain) Virginia Ruano Pascual (quarterfinals)
4. (France) Sarah Pitkowski (quarterfinals)
5. (United States) Chanda Rubin (champion)
6. (South Africa) Mariaan de Swardt (first round)
7. (Romania) Ruxandra Dragomir (second round)
8. (China) Li Fang (second round)

== Draw ==
=== Key ===
- Q = Qualifier
- WC = Wild card
- LL = Lucky loser
- Alt = Alternate
- ITF = ITF entry
- PR = Protected ranking
- SR = Special ranking
- SE = Special exempt
- JE = Junior exempt
- JR = Junior Accelerator Programme entrant
- CO = College Accelerator Programme entrant
- NG = Next Gen Accelerator Program entrant
- w/o = Walkover
- r = Retired
- d = Defaulted

=== Finals ===
Semifinals
1	(France) Julie Halard-Decugis
5	(United States) Chanda Rubin	w/o
(Italy) Rita Grande	6	7
(United States) Amy Frazier	3	5

Final
5	(United States) Chanda Rubin	6	6
(Italy) Rita Grande	2	3

=== Top half ===
First round
1	(France) J Halard-Decugis	6	6
(Germany) E Wagner	0	3
(Ukraine) E Tatarkova	6	7^{7}
Q	(Belgium) E Callens	4	6^{2}
LL	(Puerto Rico) K Brandi	2	0^{r}
(Zimbabwe) C Black	6	1
(Romania) C Cristea	2	3
8	(China) F Li	6	6
4	(France) S Pitkowski	6	6
Q	(Japan) N Miyagi	4	4
(Israel) A Smashnova	6	3	6
(Spain) G León García	2	6	4
Q	(United States) S Reeves	6	7
(France) A Dechaume-Balleret	4	5
(Chinese Taipei) S-t Wang	5	2
5	(United States) C Rubin	7	6

Second round
1	(France) J Halard-Decugis	6	6
(Ukraine) E Tatarkova	3	4
(Zimbabwe) C Black	6	6
8	(China) F Li	3	3
4	(France) S Pitkowski	6	4	6
(Israel) A Smashnova	2	6	1
Q	(United States) S Reeves	1	1
5	(United States) C Rubin	6	6

Quarterfinals
1	(France) J Halard-Decugis	3	7	7
(Zimbabwe) C Black	6	5	5
4	(France) S Pitkowski	6	1	4
5	(United States) C Rubin	4	6	6

Semifinals
1	(France) J Halard-Decugis
5	(United States) C Rubin	w/o

=== Bottom half ===
First round
7	(Romania) R Dragomir	6	3	6
(Czech Republic) K Hrdličková	3	6	3
(Argentina) F Labat	6	2	4
(Italy) R Grande	1	6	6
WC	(Australia) A Ellwood	6^{3}	1
Q	(Canada) M Drake	7^{7}	6
(United Kingdom) S Smith	2	2
3	(Spain) V Ruano Pascual	6	6
6	(South Africa) M de Swardt	5	4
(France) N Dechy	7	6
(Venezuela) M Vento	1	1
(Netherlands) M Oremans	6	6
(United States) A Frazier	6	6
(France) A-G Sidot	1	3
WC	(Australia) N Pratt	5
2	(United States) C Morariu	2^{r}

Second round
7	(Romania) R Dragomir	1	3
(Italy) R Grande	6	6
Q	(Canada) M Drake	5	6	2
3	(Spain) V Ruano Pascual	7	4	6
(France) N Dechy	6	6
(Netherlands) M Oremans	4	0
(United States) A Frazier	6	3	6
WC	(Australia) N Pratt	1	6	4

Quarterfinals
(Italy) R Grande	6	5
3	(Spain) V Ruano Pascual	2	1^{r}
(France) N Dechy	3	1
(United States) A Frazier	6	6

Semifinals
(Italy) R Grande	6	7
(United States) A Frazier	3	5

== Qualifying ==
=== Seeds ===
1. (Puerto Rico) Kristina Brandi (qualifying competition, lucky loser)
2. (Canada) Jana Nejedly (qualifying competition)
3. (Netherlands) Kristie Boogert (second round)
4. (Bulgaria) Pavlina Stoyanova (first round)
5. (France) Émilie Loit (second round)
6. (Belgium) Els Callens (qualifier)
7. (Japan) Yuka Yoshida (second round)
8. (United States) Karin Miller (first round)

=== Qualifiers ===
1. (United States) Samantha Reeves
2. (Japan) Nana Miyagi
3. (Canada) Maureen Drake
4. (Belgium) Els Callens

=== Lucky losers ===
1. (Puerto Rico) Kristina Brandi

== Qualifying draw ==
=== Key ===
- Q = Qualifier
- WC = Wild card
- LL = Lucky loser
- Alt = Alternate
- ITF = ITF entry
- PR = Protected ranking
- SR = Special ranking
- SE = Special exempt
- JE = Junior exempt
- JR = Junior Accelerator Programme entrant
- CO = College Accelerator Programme entrant
- NG = Next Gen Accelerator Program entrant
- w/o = Walkover
- r = Retired
- d = Defaulted

=== First qualifier ===
First round
1	(Puerto Rico) Kristina Brandi	6	6
(Austria) Patricia Wartusch	2	3
(Poland) Aleksandra Olsza	6	3
(Belgium) Laurence Courtois	1	0^{r}
(United States) Samantha Reeves	4	7^{7}	6
(France) Lea Ghirardi	6	6^{3}	2
(Czech Republic) Lenka Němečková	4	6^{4}
5	(France) Émilie Loit	6	7^{7}

Second round
1	(Puerto Rico) Kristina Brandi	6	6
(Poland) Aleksandra Olsza	3	2
(United States) Samantha Reeves	7^{7}	7
5	(France) Émilie Loit	6^{3}	5

Qualifying competition
1	(Puerto Rico) Kristina Brandi	6	3	3
(United States) Samantha Reeves	2	6	6

=== Second qualifier ===
First round
3	(Netherlands) Kristie Boogert	6	7
(Slovenia) Tina Križan	4	5
(Italy) Gloria Pizzichini	4	4
(United States) Alexandra Stevenson	6	6
(Japan) Nana Miyagi	6	6
(United States) Lilia Osterloh	3	3
(United States) Brie Rippner	6	6
8	(United States) Karin Miller	3	3

Second round
3	(Netherlands) Kristie Boogert	3	7^{7}	1
(United States) Alexandra Stevenson	6	6^{5}	6
(Japan) Nana Miyagi	6	1	6
(United States) Brie Rippner	4	6	1

Qualifying competition
(United States) Alexandra Stevenson	4	1
(Japan) Nana Miyagi	6	6

=== Third qualifier ===
First round
7	(Japan) Yuka Yoshida	6	6
WC	(Australia) Danielle Jones	1	1
(United States) Jolene Watanabe	6	6
(Spain) Conchita Martínez Granados	1	0
(Germany) Julia Abe	6	3	4
(Hungary) Rita Kuti-Kis	4	6	6
(Canada) Maureen Drake	6	6
4	(Bulgaria) Pavlina Stoyanova	1	1

Second round
7	(Japan) Yuka Yoshida	6^{4}	6	3
(United States) Jolene Watanabe	7^{7}	2	6
(Hungary) Rita Kuti-Kis	4	7^{7}	2
(Canada) Maureen Drake	6	6^{5}	6

Qualifying competition
(United States) Jolene Watanabe	4	7	3
(Canada) Maureen Drake	6	5	6

=== Fourth qualifier ===
First round
6	(Belgium) Els Callens	7^{8}	6
(Austria) Barbara Schwartz	6^{6}	4
(Greece) Christína Papadáki	4	1
(Italy) Francesca Lubiani	6	6
WC	(Australia) Amanda Grahame	3	2
WC	(Australia) Cindy Watson	6	6
WC	(Australia) Lisa McShea	1	2
2	(Canada) Jana Nejedly	6	6

Second round
6	(Belgium) Els Callens	5	6	6
(Italy) Francesca Lubiani	7	1	4
WC	(Australia) Cindy Watson	5	6	4
2	(Canada) Jana Nejedly	7	4	6

Qualifying competition
6	(Belgium) Els Callens	6	6
2	(Canada) Jana Nejedly	3	2
