= 2002 ANZ Tasmanian International – Doubles =

Doubles
- 2002 ANZ Tasmanian International

Final
- Champions: (Italy) Tathiana Garbin (Italy) Rita Grande
- Runners-up: (Australia) Catherine Barclay (Australia) Christina Wheeler
- Score: 6–2, 7–6^{(7–3)}

Events
| Singles | Doubles |
| ← 2001 · | Hobart International | · 2003 → |

Cara Black and Elena Likhovtseva were the defending champions, but Likhovtseva chose to compete at Canberra during the same week. Black teamed up with Nicole Pratt and were forced to withdraw at the quarterfinals.

Tathiana Garbin and Rita Grande won the title by defeating Catherine Barclay and Christina Wheeler 6–2, 7–6^{(7–3)} in the final.

== Seeds ==
1. (Spain) Virginia Ruano Pascual / (Argentina) Paola Suárez (semifinals)
2. (Zimbabwe) Cara Black / (Australia) Nicole Pratt (quarterfinals, withdrew)
3. (Italy) Tathiana Garbin / (Italy) Rita Grande (champions)
4. (Spain) María José Martínez Sánchez / (Spain) Anabel Medina Garrigues (quarterfinals)

== Draw ==
=== Key ===
- Q = Qualifier
- WC = Wild card
- LL = Lucky loser
- Alt = Alternate
- SE = Special exempt
- PR = Protected ranking
- ITF = ITF entry
- JE = Junior exempt
- w/o = Walkover
- r = Retired
- d = Defaulted
- SR = Special ranking

=== Draw ===
First round
1 | (Spain) V Ruano Pascual (Argentina) P Suárez | 7 | 6
(Switzerland) E Gagliardi (United States) M Tu | 5 | 3
(Australia) S Stone (Australia) S Stosur | w/o
(Slovakia) E Fislová (Slovakia) Ľ Kurhajcová
4 | (Spain) MJ Martínez Sánchez (Spain) A Medina Garrigues | 6 | 6
(Argentina) M Díaz Oliva (Argentina) E Krauth | 1 | 3
WC | (Australia) C Barclay (Australia) C Wheeler | 6 | 6
(Germany) B Lamade (Germany) M Müller | 1 | 1
(Russia) A Jidkova (Ukraine) T Poutchek | 7 | 7^{8}
(United States) K Brandi (South Africa) N Grandin | 5 | 6^{6}
(Germany) A Glass (United States) J Hopkins | 4 | 3
3 | (Italy) T Garbin (Italy) R Grande | 6 | 6
(South Africa) K Grant (United States) A Spears | 6 | 5 | 4
(United States) A Frazier (Slovakia) J Husárová | 0 | 7 | 6
(South Africa) J Kruger (Spain) M Marrero | 5 | 2
2 | (Zimbabwe) C Black (Australia) N Pratt | 7 | 6

Quarterfinals
1 | (Spain) V Ruano Pascual (Argentina) P Suárez | 6 | 6
(Australia) S Stone (Australia) S Stosur | 2 | 2
4 | (Spain) MJ Martínez Sánchez (Spain) A Medina Garrigues | 6 | 3 | 3
WC | (Australia) C Barclay (Australia) C Wheeler | 2 | 6 | 6
(Russia) A Jidkova (Ukraine) T Poutchek | 1 | 2
3 | (Italy) T Garbin (Italy) R Grande | 6 | 6
(United States) A Frazier (Slovakia) J Husárová | w/o
2 | (Zimbabwe) C Black (Australia) N Pratt

Semifinals
1 | (Spain) V Ruano Pascual (Argentina) P Suárez | 4 | 2
WC | (Australia) C Barclay (Australia) C Wheeler | 6 | 6
3 | (Italy) T Garbin (Italy) R Grande | 3 | 6 | 7
(United States) A Frazier (Slovakia) J Husárová | 6 | 3 | 5

Final
WC | (Australia) C Barclay (Australia) C Wheeler | 2 | 6^{3}
3 | (Italy) T Garbin (Italy) R Grande | 6 | 7^{7}
