= 1999 ANZ Tasmanian International =

- Date: 10–16 January
- Edition: 6th
- Category: Tier IVb
- Draw: 32S / 16D
- Prize money: $110,000
- Surface: Hard / outdoor
- Location: Hobart, Australia
- Venue: Hobart International Tennis Centre

Champions

Singles
- (United States) Chanda Rubin

Doubles
- (South Africa) Mariaan de Swardt (Ukraine) Elena Tatarkova
← 1998 ·	Hobart International	· 2000 →

The 1999 ANZ Tasmanian International was a women's tennis tournament played on outdoor hard courts at the Hobart International Tennis Centre in Hobart in Australia that was part of Tier IVb of the 1999 WTA Tour. It was the sixth edition of the tournament and was held from 10 through 16 January 1999.

Heading into the tournament, Swiss player Patty Schnyder was the reigning champion but she didn't defend her singles title due to her playing in Sydney in that same week. In the singles final, Fifth-seeded Chanda Rubin won the title in straight sets over unseeded Italian player, Rita Grande and earned $16,000 first-prize money.

== Finals ==
=== Singles ===
(United States) Chanda Rubin defeated (Italy) Rita Grande 6–2, 6–3

- It was Rubin's only singles title of the year and the 2nd of her career.

=== Doubles ===
(South Africa) Mariaan de Swardt / (Ukraine) Elena Tatarkova defeated (France) Alexia Dechaume-Balleret / (France) Émilie Loit 6–1, 6–2

== Entrants ==
=== Seeds ===
- Ranking date: 4 January 1999.

Country	Player	Rank	Seed
FRA	Julie Halard-Decugis	22	1
USA	Corina Morariu	31	2
ESP	Virginia Ruano Pascual	32	3
FRA	Sarah Pitkowski	33	4
USA	Chanda Rubin	35	5
RSA	Mariaan de Swardt	36	6
ROU	Ruxandra Dragomir	38	7
CHN	Li Fang	40	8

=== Other entrants ===
The following players received wildcards into the singles main draw:

- (Australia) Annabel Ellwood
- (Australia) Nicole Pratt

The following players received wildcards into the doubles main draw:

- (Australia) Annabel Ellwood / (Australia) Nicole Pratt

The following players received entry from the singles qualifying draw:

- (Belgium) Els Callens
- (Japan) Nana Miyagi
- (United States) Samantha Reeves
- (Canada) Maureen Drake

The following player received entry as a lucky loser:

- (Puerto Rico) Kristina Brandi

The following players received entry from the doubles qualifying draw:

- (United States) Lilia Osterloh / (United States) Mashona Washington

The following players received entry as a lucky loser:

- (Czech Republic) Květa Hrdličková / (Slovenia) Tina Križan
