= 2001 Dubai Duty Free Women's Open – Doubles =

Doubles
- 2001 Dubai Tennis Championships and the Dubai Duty Free Women's Open

Final
- Champions: (Indonesia) Yayuk Basuki (Netherlands) Caroline Vis
- Runners-up: (Sweden) Åsa Carlsson (Slovakia) Karina Habšudová
- Score: 6–0, 4–6, 6–2

Events
Singles	men	women
Doubles	men	women
- Dubai Tennis Championships Dubai Duty Free Women's Open

Yayuk Basuki and Caroline Vis won in the final 6–0, 4–6, 6–2 against Åsa Carlsson and Karina Habšudová.

== Seeds ==
Champion seeds are indicated in bold text while text in italics indicates the round in which those seeds were eliminated.

1. (Spain) Arantxa Sánchez-Vicario / (France) Nathalie Tauziat (semifinals)
2. (France) Mary Pierce / (Austria) Barbara Schett (quarterfinals)
3. (France) Alexandra Fusai / (Italy) Rita Grande (semifinals)
4. (Sweden) Åsa Carlsson / (Slovakia) Karina Habšudová (final)

== Draw ==
Key

- Q = Qualifier
- WC = Wild card
- LL = Lucky loser
- Alt = Alternate
- ITF = ITF entry
- PR = Protected ranking
- SR = Special ranking
- SE = Special exempt
- JE = Junior exempt
- JR = Junior Accelerator Programme entrant
- CO = College Accelerator Programme entrant
- NG = Next Gen Accelerator Program entrant
- w/o = Walkover
- r = Retired
- d = Defaulted

First round
1	(Spain) **A Sánchez-Vicario** (France) **N Tauziat**	**6**	**6**
WC	(United States) H Parkinson (India) N Vaidyanathan	2	4
Q	(Germany) **B Rittner** (Germany) **M Weingärtner**	**6**	**7^{7}**
(Federal Republic of Yugoslavia) S Načuk (Belarus) N Ostrovskaya	2	6^{4}
4	(Sweden) **Å Carlsson** (Slovakia) **K Habšudová**	**6**	**6**
LL	(Paraguay) R de los Ríos (France) S Pitkowski	1	2
(Bulgaria) **L Bacheva** (Austria) **M Maruska**	**7^{7}**	**7^{7}**
LL	(Morocco) B Mouhtassine (Tunisia) S Sfar	6^{2}	6^{2}
(Russia) **L Krasnoroutskaya** (Uzbekistan) **I Tulyaganova**	**6**	**7^{11}**
(Australia) A Molik (Kazakhstan) I Selyutina	1	6^{9}
(Belarus) T Poutchek (Germany) C Schneider	6^{4}	6^{3}
3	(France) **A Fusai** (Italy) **R Grande**	**7^{7}**	**7^{7}**
(South Africa) N de Villiers (Australia) A Ellwood	1	1
(Indonesia) **Y Basuki** (Netherlands) **C Vis**	**6**	**6**
(South Africa) K Grant (Australia) R McQuillan	3	4
2	(France) **M Pierce** (Austria) **B Schett**	**6**	**6**

Quarterfinals
1	(Spain) **A Sánchez-Vicario** (France) **N Tauziat**	**6**	1	**6**
Q	(Germany) B Rittner (Germany) M Weingärtner	2	**6**	3
4	(Sweden) **Å Carlsson** (Slovakia) **K Habšudová**	**7^{9}**	**6**
(Bulgaria) L Bacheva (Austria) M Maruska	6^{7}	3
(Russia) L Krasnoroutskaya (Uzbekistan) I Tulyaganova	**7^{7}**	3	2
3	(France) **A Fusai** (Italy) **R Grande**	6^{3}	**6**	**6**
(Indonesia) **Y Basuki** (Netherlands) **C Vis**	**6**
2	(France) M Pierce (Austria) B Schett	1	r

Semifinals
1	(Spain) A Sánchez-Vicario (France) N Tauziat	4	3
4	(Sweden) **Å Carlsson** (Slovakia) **K Habšudová**	**6**	**6**
3	(France) A Fusai (Italy) R Grande	2	**6**	3
(Indonesia) **Y Basuki** (Netherlands) **C Vis**	**6**	4	**6**

Final
4	(Sweden) Åsa Carlsson (Slovakia) Karina Habšudová	0	**6**	2
(Indonesia) **Yayuk Basuki** (Netherlands) **Caroline Vis**	**6**	4	**6**
