= 2002 ANZ Tasmanian International – Singles =

Singles
- 2002 ANZ Tasmanian International

Final
- Champion: (Slovakia) Martina Suchá
- Runner-up: (Spain) Anabel Medina Garrigues
- Score: 7–6^{(9–7)}, 6–1

Details
- Draw: 32 (2WC/4Q/2LL)
- Seeds: 8

Events
Singles	Doubles
← 2001 ·	Hobart International	· 2003 →

Rita Grande was the defending champion, but lost in the quarterfinals to Anabel Medina Garrigues.

Martina Suchá won the title by defeating Medina Garrigues 7–6^{(9–7)}, 6–1 in the final.

== Seeds ==
1. (Italy) Rita Grande (quarterfinals)
2. (Argentina) Paola Suárez (second round)
3. (Russia) ~~Nadia Petrova~~ (withdrew)
4. (Spain) Gala León García (first round)
5. (United States) Meilen Tu (quarterfinals)
6. (South Africa) Joannette Kruger (first round)
7. (United States) Amy Frazier (semifinals)
8. (Australia) Nicole Pratt (semifinals)
9. (Argentina) Mariana Díaz Oliva (first round)

== Draw ==
=== Key ===
- Q = Qualifier
- WC = Wild card
- LL = Lucky loser
- Alt = Alternate
- ITF = ITF entry
- PR = Protected ranking
- SR = Special ranking
- SE = Special exempt
- JE = Junior exempt
- JR = Junior Accelerator Programme entrant
- CO = College Accelerator Programme entrant
- NG = Next Gen Accelerator Program entrant
- w/o = Walkover
- r = Retired
- d = Defaulted

=== Finals ===
Semifinals
(Spain) Anabel Medina Garrigues	6	3	6
7	(United States) Amy Frazier	2	6	4
8	(Australia) Nicole Pratt	6	4	4
(Slovakia) Martina Suchá	1	6	6

Final
(Spain) Anabel Medina Garrigues	6^{7}	1
(Slovakia) Martina Suchá	7^{9}	6

=== Top half ===
First round
1	(Italy) R Grande	6	6
(Hungary) R Kuti-Kis	4	3
WC	(Australia) C Wheeler	1	7	3
LL	(Austria) B Schwartz	6	5	6
WC	(France) M Pierce	6	6
(United States) K Brandi	0	3
(Spain) A Medina Garrigues	6	6
9	(Argentina) M Díaz Oliva	2	2
4	(Spain) G León García	6^{3}	5
(Spain) M Marrero	7^{7}	7
(Germany) A Rösch	2	4
(Slovakia) J Husárová	6	6
(United States) M Irvin	2	4
(Switzerland) E Gagliardi	6	6
LL	(France) C Beigbeder	3	2
7	(United States) A Frazier	6	6

Second round
1	(Italy) R Grande	6	5	6
LL	(Austria) B Schwartz	4	7	4
WC	(France) M Pierce	5	4
(Spain) A Medina Garrigues	7	6
(Spain) M Marrero	2	0
(Slovakia) J Husárová	6	6
(Switzerland) E Gagliardi	6^{5}	4
7	(United States) A Frazier	7^{7}	6

Quarterfinals
1	(Italy) R Grande	2	2
(Spain) A Medina Garrigues	6	6
(Slovakia) J Husárová	2	7	2
7	(United States) A Frazier	6	5	6

Semifinals
(Spain) A Medina Garrigues	6	3	6
7	(United States) A Frazier	2	6	4

=== Bottom half ===
First round
8	(Australia) N Pratt	6	6
(France) V Razzano	2	3
(United States) J Hopkins	6	6
(Germany) B Lamade	1	1
Q	(Slovakia) L Dlhopolcová	3	6^{6}
Q	(France) S Foretz	6	7^{8}
(Zimbabwe) C Black	4	3
5	(United States) M Tu	6	6
6	(South Africa) J Kruger	3	6^{3}
Q	(Germany) M Müller	6	7^{7}
(Slovakia) M Suchá	4	7^{11}	6
(Spain) V Ruano Pascual	6	6^{9}	2
(Ukraine) T Poutchek	5	2
(Russia) A Jidkova	7	6
Q	(Ukraine) E Tatarkova	3	3
2	(Argentina) P Suárez	6	6

Second round
8	(Australia) N Pratt	6	6
(United States) J Hopkins	1	3
Q	(France) S Foretz	5	0
5	(United States) M Tu	7	6
Q	(Germany) M Müller	5	4
(Slovakia) M Suchá	7	6
(Russia) A Jidkova	1	6	6
2	(Argentina) P Suárez	6	1	2

Quarterfinals
8	(Australia) N Pratt	6	7^{7}
5	(United States) M Tu	4	6^{3}
(Slovakia) M Suchá	1	7	6
(Russia) A Jidkova	6	5	4

Semifinals
8	(Australia) N Pratt	6	4	4
(Slovakia) M Suchá	1	6	6
