= 2001 ANZ Tasmanian International =

- Date: 7–13 January
- Edition: 8th
- Category: Tier V
- Draw: 32S / 16D
- Prize money: $110,000
- Surface: Hard / Outdoor
- Location: Hobart, Australia
- Venue: Hobart International Tennis Centre

Champions

Singles
- (Italy) Rita Grande

Doubles
- (Zimbabwe) Cara Black / (Russia) Elena Likhovtseva
← 2000 ·	Hobart International	· 2002 →

The 2001 ANZ Tasmanian International was a women's tennis tournament played on outdoor hard courts at the Hobart International Tennis Centre in Hobart, [Australia and was part of Tier V of the 2001 WTA Tour. It was the eighth edition of the tournament and ran from 7 January until 13 January 2001. Unseeded Rita Grande won the singles title and earned $16,000 first-prize money.

== Finals ==
=== Singles ===
(Italy) Rita Grande defeated (United States) Jennifer Hopkins 0–6, 6–3, 6–3

- It was Grande's 2nd title of the year and the 5th of her career.

=== Doubles ===
(Zimbabwe) Cara Black / (Russia) Elena Likhovtseva defeated (Romania) Ruxandra Dragomir / (Spain) Virginia Ruano Pascual 6–4, 6–1

- It was Black's 1st title of the year and the 2nd of her career. It was Likhovtseva's 1st title of the year and the 10th of her career.

== Entrants ==
=== Seeds ===
Country	Player	Rank^{1}	Seed
USA	Amy Frazier	20	1
RUS	Elena Likhovtseva	21	2
USA	Kristina Brandi	27	3
FRA	Anne-Gaëlle Sidot	35	4
ZIM	Cara Black	41	5
ROM	Ruxandra Dragomir	44	6
ISR	Anna Smashnova	46	7
FRA	Sarah Pitkowski	65	8

- Rankings are as of 1 January 2001.

=== Other entrants ===
The following players received wildcards into the singles main draw:

- (Australia) Rachel McQuillan
- (Australia) Lisa McShea

The following players received entry from the qualifying draw:

- (Japan) Saori Obata
- (Slovenia) Katarina Srebotnik
- (France) Stéphanie Foretz
- (Spain) Anabel Medina Garrigues
