= 2001 Dubai Duty Free Women's Open – Singles =

Singles
- 2001 Dubai Tennis Championships and the Dubai Duty Free Women's Open

Final
- Champion: (Switzerland) Martina Hingis
- Runner-up: (France) Nathalie Tauziat
- Score: 6–4, 6–4

Details
- Draw: 28
- Seeds: 8

Events
Singles	men	women
Doubles	men	women
- Dubai Tennis Championships Dubai Duty Free Women's Open

Martina Hingis won in the final 6–4, 6–4 against Nathalie Tauziat.

== Seeds ==
A champion seed is indicated in bold text while text in italics indicates the round in which that seed was eliminated. The top four seeds received a bye to the second round.

1. (Switzerland) **Martina Hingis (champion)**
2. (France) Mary Pierce (quarterfinals)
3. (France) Nathalie Tauziat (final)
4. (Spain) Arantxa Sánchez-Vicario (second round)
5. (France) Sandrine Testud (quarterfinals)
6. (Austria) Barbara Schett (second round)
7. (Thailand) Tamarine Tanasugarn (semifinals)
8. (Slovakia) Henrieta Nagyová (second round)

== Draw ==
Key

- Q = Qualifier
- WC = Wild card
- LL = Lucky loser
- Alt = Alternate
- ITF = ITF entry
- PR = Protected ranking
- SR = Special ranking
- SE = Special exempt
- JE = Junior exempt
- JR = Junior Accelerator Programme entrant
- CO = College Accelerator Programme entrant
- NG = Next Gen Accelerator Program entrant
- w/o = Walkover
- r = Retired
- d = Defaulted

=== Final ===
Final
1	(Switzerland) **Martina Hingis**	**6**	**6**
3	(France) Nathalie Tauziat	4	4

=== Top half ===
First round
(South Africa) **J Kruger**	**4**
(Croatia) I Majoli	0	r
(Netherlands) **M Oremans**	**6**	5	**7^{8}**
Q	(Australia) A Molik	3	**7**	6^{6}
(France) S Pitkowski	3	2
5	(France) **S Testud**	**6**	**6**
Q	(Russia) **L Krasnoroutskaya**	**6**	**4**
(Netherlands) K Boogert	0	1	r
(Germany) **M Weingärtner**	**6**	**6**
(Sweden) Å Carlsson	2	3
(Bulgaria) P Nola	3	**6**	1
7	(Thailand) **T Tanasugarn**	**6**	1	**6**

Second round
1	(Switzerland) **M Hingis**	**6**	**6**
(South Africa) J Kruger	2	1
(Netherlands) M Oremans	3	4
5	(France) **S Testud**	**6**	**6**
4	(Spain) A Sánchez-Vicario	3	**7**	3
Q	(Russia) **L Krasnoroutskaya**	**6**	5	**6**
(Germany) M Weingärtner	3	**7^{7}**	4
7	(Thailand) **T Tanasugarn**	**6**	6^{5}	**6**

Quarterfinals
1	(Switzerland) **M Hingis**	**6**	5	**6**
5	(France) S Testud	3	**7**	4
Q	(Russia) L Krasnoroutskaya	6^{1}	3
7	(Thailand) **T Tanasugarn**	**7^{7}**	**6**

Semifinals
1	(Switzerland) **M Hingis**	**7^{8}**	**6**
7	(Thailand) T Tanasugarn	6^{6}	1

=== Bottom half ===
First round
6	(Austria) **B Schett**	**6**	**6**
WC	(Morocco) B Mouhtassine	4	1
(Croatia) S Talaja	1	3
WC	(Tunisia) **S Sfar**	**6**	**6**
(Italy) **R Grande**	**6**	**6**
(Czech Republic) A Gerši	2	1
8	(Slovakia) **H Nagyová**	**6**	**6**
(Belarus) O Barabanschikova	4	2
Q	(Australia) **R McQuillan**	**6**	**6**
Q	(United States) H Parkinson	2	3
(Paraguay) R de los Ríos	2	4
(Uzbekistan) **I Tulyaganova**	**6**	**6**

Second round
6	(Austria) B Schett	6^{5}	**6**	5
WC	(Tunisia) **S Sfar**	**7^{7}**	2	**7**
(Italy) R Grande	**6**	4	3
3	(France) **N Tauziat**	2	**6**	**6**
8	(Slovakia) H Nagyová	1	4
Q	(Australia) **R McQuillan**	**6**	**6**
(Uzbekistan) I Tulyaganova	6^{4}	4
2	(France) **M Pierce**	**7^{7}**	**6**

Quarterfinals
WC	(Tunisia) S Sfar	6^{3}	**7**	3
3	(France) **N Tauziat**	**7^{7}**	5	**6**
Q	(Australia) **R McQuillan**	**6**	**6**
2	(France) M Pierce	3	1

Semifinals
3	(France) **N Tauziat**	**7^{7}**	**6**
Q	(Australia) R McQuillan	6^{5}	4
