= 1999 ANZ Tasmanian International – Doubles =

Doubles
- 1999 ANZ Tasmanian International

Final
- Champions: (South Africa) Mariaan de Swardt (Ukraine) Elena Tatarkova
- Runners-up: (France) Alexia Dechaume-Balleret (France) Émilie Loit
- Score: 6–1, 6–2

Events
Singles	Doubles
← 1998 ·	ANZ Tasmanian International	· 2000 →

The 1999 ANZ Tasmanian International doubles was the doubles event of the sixth edition of the ANZ Tasmanian International. Virginia Ruano Pascual and Paola Suárez were the reigning champions but only Ruano Pascual competed that year with Florencia Labat. Labat and Ruano Pascual lost in the first round to Nannie de Villiers and Eva Melicharová.

Mariaan de Swardt and Elena Tatarkova won in the final 6–1, 6–2 against Alexia Dechaume-Balleret and Émilie Loit.

== Seeds ==
1. (South Africa) Mariaan de Swardt / (Ukraine) Elena Tatarkova (champions)
2. (Belgium) Els Callens / (France) Julie Halard-Decugis (semifinals)
3. (Argentina) Florencia Labat / (Spain) Virginia Ruano Pascual (first round)
4. (Belgium) Sabine Appelmans / (Netherlands) Miriam Oremans (withdrew)

== Draw ==
=== Key ===
- Q = Qualifier
- WC = Wild card
- LL = Lucky loser
- Alt = Alternate
- ITF = ITF entry
- PR = Protected ranking
- SR = Special ranking
- SE = Special exempt
- JE = Junior exempt
- JR = Junior Accelerator Programme entrant
- CO = College Accelerator Programme entrant
- NG = Next Gen Accelerator Program entrant
- w/o = Walkover
- r = Retired
- d = Defaulted

First round
1	(South Africa) M de Swardt (Ukraine) E Tatarkova	6	6
(Italy) R Grande (Germany) E Wagner	1	4
(Zimbabwe) C Black (Kazakhstan) I Selyutina	6	3	6
Q	(United States) L Osterloh (United States) M Washington	2	6	2
3	(Argentina) F Labat (Spain) V Ruano Pascual	6^{2}	7^{7}	3
(South Africa) N de Villiers (Czech Republic) E Melicharová	7^{7}	6^{4}	6
(Germany) C Singer (Czech Republic) H Vildová	4	5
(United States) S Reeves (France) A-G Sidot	6	7
(France) A Dechaume-Balleret (France) É Loit	4	6	7
WC	(Australia) A Ellwood (Australia) N Pratt	6	2	5
(Japan) N Miyagi (Japan) Y Yoshida	3	2
LL	(Czech Republic) K Hrdličková (Slovenia) T Križan	6	6
(Romania) C Cristea (Romania) R Dragomir	3	6	6
(United States) A Frazier (Bulgaria) P Stoyanova	6	4	4
(South Korea) S-h Park (Chinese Taipei) S-t Wang	6	1	2
2	(Belgium) E Callens (France) J Halard-Decugis	3	6	6

Quarterfinals
1	(South Africa) M de Swardt (Ukraine) E Tatarkova	6	6
(Zimbabwe) C Black (Kazakhstan) I Selyutina	4	4
(South Africa) N de Villiers (Czech Republic) E Melicharová	7	7^{7}
(United States) S Reeves (France) A-G Sidot	5	6^{0}
(France) A Dechaume-Balleret (France) É Loit	6	6
LL	(Czech Republic) K Hrdličková (Slovenia) T Križan	3	4
(Romania) C Cristea (Romania) R Dragomir	5	6	4
2	(Belgium) E Callens (France) J Halard-Decugis	7	4	6

Semifinals
1	(South Africa) M de Swardt (Ukraine) E Tatarkova	6	3	6
(South Africa) N de Villiers (Czech Republic) E Melicharová	2	6	3
(France) A Dechaume-Balleret (France) É Loit	w/o
2	(Belgium) E Callens (France) J Halard-Decugis

Final
1	(South Africa) M de Swardt (Ukraine) E Tatarkova	6	6
(France) A Dechaume-Balleret (France) É Loit	1	2

== Qualifying ==
=== Seeds ===
1. (Czech Republic) Květa Hrdličková / (Slovenia) Tina Križan (qualifying competition, lucky loser)
2. (United States) Lilia Osterloh / (United States) Mashona Washington (qualifiers)

=== Qualifiers ===
1. (United States) Lilia Osterloh / (United States) Mashona Washington

=== Lucky losers ===
1. ' (Czech Republic) Květa Hrdličková / (Slovenia) Tina Križan

== Qualifying draw ==
=== Key ===
- Q = Qualifier
- WC = Wild card
- LL = Lucky loser
- Alt = Alternate
- ITF = ITF entry
- PR = Protected ranking
- SR = Special ranking
- SE = Special exempt
- JE = Junior exempt
- JR = Junior Accelerator Programme entrant
- CO = College Accelerator Programme entrant
- NG = Next Gen Accelerator Program entrant
- w/o = Walkover
- r = Retired
- d = Defaulted

First round
1	(Czech Republic) Květa Hrdličková (Slovenia) Tina Križan	8
(Poland) Aleksandra Olsza (Italy) Gloria Pizzichini	4
(United States) Brie Rippner (United Kingdom) Samantha Smith	8
(Australia) Amanda Grahame (Australia) Danielle Jones	6
(United States) Karin Miller (Indonesia) Wynne Prakusya	8
(Italy) Tathiana Garbin (Spain) Conchita Martínez Granados	2
(France) Nathalie Dechy (France) Sarah Pitkowski	4
2	(United States) Lilia Osterloh (United States) Mashona Washington	8

Second round
1	(Czech Republic) Květa Hrdličková (Slovenia) Tina Križan	8
(United States) Brie Rippner (United Kingdom) Samantha Smith	4
(United States) Karin Miller (Indonesia) Wynne Prakusya	2
2	(United States) Lilia Osterloh (United States) Mashona Washington	8

Qualifying competition
1	(Czech Republic) Květa Hrdličková (Slovenia) Tina Križan	4
2	(United States) Lilia Osterloh (United States) Mashona Washington	8
