= 2001 Dubai Tennis Championships – Doubles =

Doubles
- 2001 Dubai Tennis Championships and the Dubai Duty Free Women's Open

Final
- Champions: (Australia) Joshua Eagle (Australia) Sandon Stolle
- Runners-up: (Canada) Daniel Nestor (Federal Republic of Yugoslavia) Nenad Zimonjić
- Score: 6–4, 6–4

Details
- Draw: 16
- Seeds: 4

Events
Singles	men	women
Doubles	men	women
- Dubai Tennis Championships Dubai Duty Free Women's Open

Jiří Novák and David Rikl were the defending champions but lost in the quarterfinals to Tomáš Cibulec and Leoš Friedl.

Joshua Eagle and Sandon Stolle won in the final 6–4, 6–4 against Daniel Nestor and Nenad Zimonjić.

== Seeds ==
1. (Russia) Yevgeny Kafelnikov / (Belarus) Max Mirnyi (semifinals)
2. (Czech Republic) Jiří Novák / (Czech Republic) David Rikl (quarterfinals)
3. (Australia) Joshua Eagle / (Australia) Sandon Stolle (champions)
4. (Canada) Daniel Nestor / (Federal Republic of Yugoslavia) Nenad Zimonjić (final)

== Draw ==
Key

- Q = Qualifier
- WC = Wild card
- LL = Lucky loser
- Alt = Alternate
- ITF = ITF entry
- PR = Protected ranking
- SR = Special ranking
- SE = Special exempt
- JE = Junior exempt
- JR = Junior Accelerator Programme entrant
- CO = College Accelerator Programme entrant
- NG = Next Gen Accelerator Program entrant
- w/o = Walkover
- r = Retired
- d = Defaulted

First round
1	(Russia) Y Kafelnikov (Belarus) M Mirnyi	6^{5}	6	7^{7}
(France) J Boutter (Czech Republic) C Suk	7^{7}	4	6^{3}
WC	(Spain) À Corretja (Germany) N Kiefer	5	6	6^{9}
(India) M Bhupathi (India) L Paes	7	2	7^{11}
3	(Australia) J Eagle (Australia) S Stolle	6	7^{7}
Q	(South Africa) M Barnard (Russia) A Olhovskiy	2	6^{5}
(South Africa) C Haggard (Belgium) T Vanhoudt	7^{7}	6^{3}	6
(Australia) M Hill (United States) J Tarango	6^{5}	7^{7}	3
WC	(Sweden) J Björkman (Australia) P Rafter	6^{3}	6	6^{2}
(Slovakia) D Hrbatý (Germany) D Prinosil	7^{7}	1	7^{7}
(Zimbabwe) W Black (Zimbabwe) K Ullyett	6^{5}	2
4	(Canada) D Nestor (Federal Republic of Yugoslavia) N Zimonjić	7^{7}	6
(Czech Republic) T Cibulec (Czech Republic) L Friedl	4	6	6
WC	(Netherlands) S Groen (Russia) M Safin	6	4	3
(Czech Republic) P Pála (Czech Republic) P Vízner	4	2
2	(Czech Republic) J Novák (Czech Republic) D Rikl	6	6

Quarterfinals
1	(Russia) Y Kafelnikov (Belarus) M Mirnyi	4	6	7
(India) M Bhupathi (India) L Paes	6	3	5
3	(Australia) J Eagle (Australia) S Stolle	6	6
(South Africa) C Haggard (Belgium) T Vanhoudt	1	3
(Slovakia) D Hrbatý (Germany) D Prinosil	6	6^{6}	2
4	(Canada) D Nestor (Federal Republic of Yugoslavia) N Zimonjić	4	7^{8}	6
(Czech Republic) T Cibulec (Czech Republic) L Friedl	6	7^{7}
2	(Czech Republic) J Novák (Czech Republic) D Rikl	3	6^{4}

Semifinals
1	(Russia) Y Kafelnikov (Belarus) M Mirnyi	3	3
3	(Australia) J Eagle (Australia) S Stolle	6	6
4	(Canada) D Nestor (Federal Republic of Yugoslavia) N Zimonjić	7^{7}	6^{6}	6
(Czech Republic) T Cibulec (Czech Republic) L Friedl	6^{5}	7^{8}	3

Final
3	(Australia) J Eagle (Australia) S Stolle	6	6
4	(Canada) D Nestor (Federal Republic of Yugoslavia) N Zimonjić	4	4
