= 2000 ANZ Tasmanian International =

- Date: 9 – 15 January
- Edition: 7th
- Category: Tier IVb
- Draw: 32S / 16D
- Prize money: $110,000
- Surface: Hard / outdoor
- Location: Hobart, Australia
- Venue: Hobart International Tennis Centre

Champions

Singles
- (Belgium) Kim Clijsters

Doubles
- (Italy) Rita Grande / (France) Émilie Loit
← 1999 ·	Hobart International	· 2001 →

The 2000 ANZ Tasmanian International was a women's tennis tournament played on outdoor hard courts at the Hobart International Tennis Centre in Hobart in Australia that was part of Tier IVb of the 2000 WTA Tour. It was the seventh edition of the tournament and was held from 9 January until 15 January 2000. Unseeded Kim Clijsters won the singles title and earned $16,000 first-prize money.

== Finals ==
=== Singles ===
(Belgium) Kim Clijsters defeated (United States) Chanda Rubin 2–6, 6–2, 6–2

- It was Clijsters' 1st singles title of the year and the 2nd of her career.

=== Doubles ===
(Italy) Rita Grande / (France) Émilie Loit defeated (Belgium) Kim Clijsters / (Australia) Alicia Molik 6–2, 2–6, 6–3
