= 2000 ANZ Tasmanian International – Doubles =

Doubles
- 2000 ANZ Tasmanian International

Final
- Champions: (Italy) Rita Grande (France) Émilie Loit
- Runners-up: (Belgium) Kim Clijsters (Australia) Alicia Molik
- Score: 6–2, 2–6, 6–3

Details
- Draw: 16
- Seeds: 4

Events
Singles	Doubles
← 1999 ·	Hobart International	· 2001 →

Mariaan de Swardt and Elena Tatarkova were the defending champions, but none competed this year.

Rita Grande and Émilie Loit won the title by defeating Kim Clijsters and Alicia Molik 6–2, 2–6, 6–3 in the final.

== Seeds ==
1. (Zimbabwe) Cara Black / (United States) Debbie Graham (first round)
2. (Romania) Cătălina Cristea / (Romania) Ruxandra Dragomir (quarterfinals)
3. (Belgium) Els Callens / (Slovenia) Katarina Srebotnik (semifinals)
4. (Italy) Rita Grande / (France) Émilie Loit (champions)

== Draw ==
Key

- Q = Qualifier
- WC = Wild card
- LL = Lucky loser
- Alt = Alternate
- ITF = ITF entry
- PR = Protected ranking
- SR = Special ranking
- SE = Special exempt
- JE = Junior exempt
- JR = Junior Accelerator Programme entrant
- CO = College Accelerator Programme entrant
- NG = Next Gen Accelerator Program entrant
- w/o = Walkover
- r = Retired
- d = Defaulted

=== Draw ===
First round
1	(Zimbabwe) C Black (United States) D Graham	2	7^{7}	3
(United States) A Frazier (United States) K Schlukebir	6	6^{1}	6
(South Africa) N de Villiers (Australia) L McShea	4	4
(Netherlands) K Boogert (Netherlands) M Oremans	6	6
4	(Italy) R Grande (France) É Loit	6	7^{7}
Q	(Canada) M Drake (Russia) T Panova	3	6^{4}
(United States) E deLone (Australia) N Pratt	4	6	6
(France) A Cocheteux (Czech Republic) L Němečková	6	4	3
(Australia) A Ellwood (Croatia) J Kostanić	3	6	6
(Austria) B Schwartz (Austria) P Wartusch	6	4	3
WC	(Australia) A Grahame (Austria) S Plischke	6^{2}	5
3	(Belgium) E Callens (Slovenia) K Srebotnik	7^{7}	7
(Netherlands) A Hopmans (United States) M Shaughnessy	5	4
(Belgium) K Clijsters (Australia) A Molik	7	6
(Spain) A Ortuño (Spain) C Torrens Valero	3	4
2	(Romania) C Cristea (Romania) R Dragomir	6	6

Quarterfinals
(United States) A Frazier (United States) K Schlukebir	7^{7}	6
(Netherlands) K Boogert (Netherlands) M Oremans	6^{4}	4
4	(Italy) R Grande (France) É Loit	6	4	7^{7}
(United States) E deLone (Australia) N Pratt	2	6	6^{4}
(Australia) A Ellwood (Croatia) J Kostanić	0	2
3	(Belgium) E Callens (Slovenia) K Srebotnik	6	6
(Belgium) K Clijsters (Australia) A Molik	6	6
2	(Romania) C Cristea (Romania) R Dragomir	2	2

Semifinals
(United States) A Frazier (United States) K Schlukebir	6^{6}	3
4	(Italy) R Grande (France) É Loit	7^{8}	6
3	(Belgium) E Callens (Slovenia) K Srebotnik	6^{4}	7	2
(Belgium) K Clijsters (Australia) A Molik	7^{7}	5	6

Final
4	(Italy) R Grande (France) É Loit	6	2	6
(Belgium) K Clijsters (Australia) A Molik	2	6	3
