= 2001 Dubai Tennis Championships – Singles =

Singles
- 2001 Dubai Tennis Championships and the Dubai Duty Free Women's Open

Final
- Champion: (Spain) Juan Carlos Ferrero
- Runner-up: (Russia) Marat Safin
- Score: 6–2, 3–1 (Safin retired)

Details
- Draw: 32
- Seeds: 8

Events
Singles	men	women
Doubles	men	women
- Dubai Tennis Championships Dubai Duty Free Women's Open

Nicolas Kiefer was the defending champion, but lost in the first round to Patrick Rafter.

Juan Carlos Ferrero won the final 6–2, 3–1 after Marat Safin was forced to retire.

== Seeds ==
A champion seed is indicated in bold text while text in italics indicates the round in which that seed was eliminated.

1. (Russia) Marat Safin (final, retired because of a back injury)
2. (Sweden) Magnus Norman (quarterfinals)
3. (Russia) Yevgeny Kafelnikov (second round)
4. (Spain) Àlex Corretja (first round)
5. (Australia) Patrick Rafter (second round)
6. (Slovakia) Dominik Hrbatý (semifinals)
7. (Spain) **Juan Carlos Ferrero (champion)**
8. (France) Cédric Pioline (first round)

== Draw ==
Key

- Q = Qualifier
- WC = Wild card
- LL = Lucky loser
- Alt = Alternate
- ITF = ITF entry
- PR = Protected ranking
- SR = Special ranking
- SE = Special exempt
- JE = Junior exempt
- JR = Junior Accelerator Programme entrant
- CO = College Accelerator Programme entrant
- NG = Next Gen Accelerator Program entrant
- w/o = Walkover
- r = Retired
- d = Defaulted

First round
1	(Russia) **M Safin**	**7**	**6**
(Germany) D Prinosil	5	2
(France) **J Boutter**	**7**	1	**6**
WC	(Australia) J Eagle	5	**6**	1
(Ukraine) **A Medvedev**	**6**	**7^{13}**
Q	(Canada) D Nestor	3	6^{11}
(Germany) N Kiefer	2	4
5	(Australia) **P Rafter**	**6**	**6**
3	(Russia) **Y Kafelnikov**	**7^{7}**	**6**
(Czech Republic) C Doseděl	6^{3}	2
(Germany) R Schüttler	2	1
(Sweden) **T Johansson**	**6**	**6**
(Australia) A Ilie	4	3
(Belarus) **V Voltchkov**	**6**	**6**
(Belarus) **M Mirnyi**	**7^{10}**	**7**
8	(France) C Pioline	6^{8}	5
6	(Slovakia) **D Hrbatý**	**6**	6^{7}	**7^{7}**
Q	(Germany) T Behrend	4	**7^{9}**	6^{5}
(France) J Golmard	3	r
(Czech Republic) **B Ulihrach**	**6**
(France) **N Escudé**	4	**6**	**7^{7}**
WC	(Slovakia) K Kučera	**6**	4	6^{2}
Q	(Germany) **L Burgsmüller**	**6**	**6**
4	(Spain) À Corretja	4	2
7	(Spain) **J C Ferrero**	**6**	**6**
(Sweden) J Björkman	4	3
(Czech Republic) **J Novák**	**6**	**6**
(Italy) G Pozzi	4	1
(Romania) **A Pavel**	**6**	**6**
WC	(United Arab Emirates) O Bahrouzyan	1	2
Q	(United States) J Tarango	4	4
2	(Sweden) **M Norman**	**6**	**6**

Second round
1	(Russia) **M Safin**	**7**	**7^{7}**
(France) J Boutter	5	6^{5}
(Ukraine) **A Medvedev**	**7^{7}**	4	**6**
5	(Australia) P Rafter	6^{1}	**6**	1
3	(Russia) Y Kafelnikov	6^{4}	5
(Sweden) **T Johansson**	**7^{7}**	**7**
(Belarus) V Voltchkov	1	4
(Belarus) **M Mirnyi**	**6**	**6**
6	(Slovakia) **D Hrbatý**	5	**7^{7}**	**6**
(Czech Republic) B Ulihrach	**7**	6^{3}	3
(France) N Escudé	2	r
Q	(Germany) **L Burgsmüller**	**6**
7	(Spain) **J C Ferrero**	**6**	**6**
(Czech Republic) J Novák	3	4
(Romania) A Pavel	**6**	3	6^{2}
2	(Sweden) **M Norman**	1	**6**	**7^{7}**

Quarterfinals
1	(Russia) **M Safin**	**6**	**6**
(Ukraine) A Medvedev	1	2
(Sweden) **T Johansson**	**6**	**6**
(Belarus) M Mirnyi	4	4
6	(Slovakia) **D Hrbatý**	**7**	**6**
Q	(Germany) L Burgsmüller	5	4
7	(Spain) **J C Ferrero**	**6**	4	**6**
2	(Sweden) M Norman	2	**6**	4

Semifinals
1	(Russia) **M Safin**	6^{0}	**7^{7}**	**6**
(Sweden) T Johansson	**7^{7}**	6^{4}	3
6	(Slovakia) D Hrbatý	**7**	6^{4}	3
7	(Spain) **J C Ferrero**	5	**7^{7}**	**6**

Final
1	(Russia) Marat Safin	2	1^{r}
7	(Spain) **J C Ferrero**	**6**	3
