= 2002 ANZ Tasmanian International =

- Date: 6 – 12 January
- Edition: 9th
- Category: Tier V
- Draw: 32S / 16D
- Prize money: $110,000
- Surface: Hard / Outdoor
- Location: Hobart, Australia
- Venue: Hobart International Tennis Centre

Champions

Singles
- (Slovakia) Martina Suchá

Doubles
- (Italy) Tathiana Garbin / (Italy) Rita Grande
← 2001 ·	Hobart International	· 2003 →

The 2002 ANZ Tasmanian International was a women's tennis tournament played on outdoor hard courts at the Hobart International Tennis Centre in Hobart, Australia and was part of Tier V of the 2002 WTA Tour. It was the ninth edition of the tournament and ran from 6 January until 12 January 2002. Unseeded Martina Suchá won the singles title and earned $16,000 first-prize money.

== Finals ==
=== Singles ===
(Slovakia) Martina Suchá defeated (Spain) Anabel Medina Garrigues 7–6^{(9–7)}, 6–1

- It was Suchá's first title of her career.

=== Doubles ===
(Italy) Tathiana Garbin / (Italy) Rita Grande defeated (Australia) Catherine Barclay / (Australia) Christina Wheeler 6–2, 7–6^{(7–3)}
