= 2001 Dubai Tennis Championships and Duty Free Women's Open =

2001 Dubai Tennis Championships and Dubai Duty Free Women's Open
- Date: February 26 – March 4 (men); February 19 – February 24 (women)
- Edition: 8th (men) / 1st (women)
- Surface: Hard / outdoor
- Location: Dubai, United Arab Emirates
- Venue: Aviation Club Tennis Centre

Champions

Men's singles
- (Spain) Juan Carlos Ferrero

Women's singles
- (Switzerland) Martina Hingis

Men's doubles
- (Australia) Joshua Eagle / (Australia) Sandon Stolle

Women's doubles
- (Indonesia) Yayuk Basuki / (Netherlands) Caroline Vis
- Dubai Tennis Championships Dubai Duty Free Women's Open

The 2001 Dubai Tennis Championships and Dubai Duty Free Women's Open were tennis tournaments played on outdoor hard courts at the Aviation Club Tennis Centre in Dubai in the United Arab Emirates that were part of the International Series Gold of the 2001 ATP Tour and of Tier II of the 2001 WTA Tour. The men's tournament was held from February 26 through March 4, 2001 while the women's tournament was held from February 19 through February 24, 2001. Juan Carlos Ferrero and Martina Hingis won the singles titles.

== Finals ==
=== Men's singles ===
(Spain) Juan Carlos Ferrero defeated (Russia) Marat Safin 6–2, 3–1 (Safin retired)

- It was Ferrero's 1st title of the year and the 2nd of his career.

=== Women's singles ===
(Switzerland) Martina Hingis defeated (France) Nathalie Tauziat 6–4, 6–4

- It was Hingis' 3rd title of the year and the 70th of her career.

=== Men's doubles ===
(Australia) Joshua Eagle / (Australia) Sandon Stolle defeated (Canada) Daniel Nestor / (Federal Republic of Yugoslavia) Nenad Zimonjić 6–4, 6–4

- It was Eagle's only title of the year and the 2nd of his career. It was Stolle's 2nd title of the year and the 18th of his career.

=== Women's doubles ===
(Indonesia) Yayuk Basuki / (Netherlands) Caroline Vis defeated (Sweden) Åsa Carlsson / (Slovakia) Karina Habšudová 6–0, 4–6, 6–2

- It was Basuki's only title of the year and the 15th of her career. It was Vis' only title of the year and the 9th of her career.
