= Jana Nejedly =

Czech-born Canadian tennis player

- Country (sports): Canada
- Residence: Naples, Florida, U.S.
- Born: June 9, 1974 (age 51) Prague, Czechoslovakia
- Height: 1.75 m (5 ft 9 in)
- Turned pro: February 3, 1994
- Retired: 2003
- Plays: Right-handed (two-handed backhand)
- Prize money: $630,096

Singles
- Career record: 318–265
- Career titles: 0 WTA, 8 ITF
- Highest ranking: No. 64 (October 2, 2000)

Grand Slam singles results
- Australian Open: 3R (1999)
- French Open: 2R (1999)
- Wimbledon: 2R (1995)
- US Open: 3R (2001)

Other tournaments
- Olympic Games: 1R (1996)

Doubles
- Career record: 23–60
- Career titles: 0
- Highest ranking: No. 227 (August 12, 1996)

Team competitions
- Fed Cup: 20–6

Jana Nejedly (born June 9, 1974 as Jana Nejedlá) is a Czech-born Canadian former professional tennis player. Her highest WTA singles ranking is 64th, which she reached on October 2, 2000.

Born in Prague and raised in Vancouver, Nejedly resided in Toronto, Boston, and Naples, Florida at different times. Nejedly retired in 2003 but had a brief return in 2012. She would finally retire for the last time that July.

== ITF Circuit finals ==
$50,000 tournaments
$25,000 tournaments
$10,000 tournaments

=== Singles: 12 (8–4) ===
Outcome	No.	Date	Tournament	Surface	Opponent	Score
Runner-up	1.	22 June 1992	ITF Greensboro, United States	Clay	(United States) Susan Sommerville	1–6, 1–6
Winner	2.	31 August 1992	ITF Toluca, Mexico	Hard	(Czechoslovakia) Nora Kovařčíková	6–4, 6–4
Runner-up	3.	26 April 1993	ITF Acapulco, Mexico	Clay	(United States) Jolene Watanabe	4–6, 2–6
Runner-up	4.	26 June 1994	ITF Hilton Head Island, United States	Clay	(United States) Karin Miller	4–6, 6–3, 0–6
Winner	5.	6 October 1996	ITF Puerto Vallarta, United States	Hard	(Venezuela) María Vento-Kabchi	7–6, 6–4
Winner	6.	23 June 1997	ITF Greenwood, United States	Hard	(United States) Holly Parkinson	7–5, 6–3
Winner	7.	21 September 1998	ITF Seattle, United States	Hard	(United States) Lilia Osterloh	6–1, 6–3
Winner	8.	11 July 1999	ITF Edmonton, Canada	Hard	(Canada) Renata Kolbovic	2–6, 6–3, 6–3
Runner-up	9.	19 September 1999	ITF Hopewell, United States	Hard	(China) Li Fang	0–6, 4–6
Winner	10.	12 January 2003	ITF Tallahassee, United States	Hard	(Canada) Mélanie Marois	6–4, 6–0
Winner	11.	18 March 2003	ITF Redding, United States	Hard	(China) Zheng Jie	7–5, 7–6
Winner	12.	25 March 2003	ITF Atlanta, United States	Hard	(United States) Jennifer Hopkins	6–2, 7–5
