= Holly Parkinson =

American tennis player (born 1979)

- Full name: Holly Parkinson-Hasler
- Country (sports): United States
- Born: February 10, 1979 (age 47) Bethesda, Maryland, U.S.
- Plays: Right-handed
- Prize money: $186,323

Singles
- Career titles: 0 WTA, 6 ITF
- Highest ranking: No. 85 (November 13, 2000)

Grand Slam singles results
- Australian Open: 2R (2001)
- French Open: 1R (2000)
- Wimbledon: 1R (2000)
- US Open: 1R (2000)

Doubles
- Highest ranking: No. 168 (June 12, 2000)

Holly Parkinson-Hasler (born February 10, 1979) is a former professional tennis player from the United States.

== Biography ==
Parkinson is originally from Bethesda, Maryland, the second oldest of seven children. Her father is an orthopedic surgeon and gulf war veteran. She began playing tennis at the age of eight and went to school at Westfield HS in Houston. Raised as a Mormon, she attended Brigham Young University in Utah.

A right-handed player, Parkinson won six ITF circuit singles titles between 1997 and 1999, then began competing in the main draw of WTA Tour events. Her best performance came at the Advanta Championships of Philadelphia in 2000 where she made the quarter-finals as a lucky loser. After beating Kristina Brandi in the first round, she received a walkover against Chanda Rubin, before being eliminated by third seed Conchita Martínez.

She featured in the main draw of all four grand slam events during her career. After falling in the final round of qualifying at the 2000 Australian Open, Parkinson received direct entry into the main draw of the other three grand slam tournaments that year courtesy of her ranking, which peaked at 85 in the world in November. At the 2000 US Open she lost in the opening round to Anna Kournikova, in a match that was played in the night session on Arthur Ashe Stadium. Her only win in a grand slam main draw came at the 2001 Australian Open where she defeated Spain's Ángeles Montolio, then lost a three-set match to local wildcard Evie Dominikovic.

== ITF singles titles ==
No.	Date	Category	Tournament	Surface	Opponent	Score
1.	June, 1997	$10,000	El Paso, US	Hard	(United States) Samantha Reeves	3–6, 6–4, 6–2
2.	June, 1997	$10,000	Little Rock, US	Hard	(United States) Samantha Reeves	6–3, 6–1
3.	June, 1998	$10,000	Hilton Head Island, US	Hard	(Canada) Renata Kolbovic	3–6, 6–4, 6–4
4.	January, 1999	$10,000	San Antonio, US	Hard	(Russia) Alina Jidkova	3–6, 6–4, 6–3
5.	November, 1999	$25,000	Mount Gambier, Australia	Hard	(Kazakhstan) Irina Selyutina	6–4, 6–0
6.	December, 1999	$25,000	Port Pirie, Australia	Hard	(Australia) Kerry-Ann Guse	6–3, 6–4
