= Jennifer Hopkins =

American tennis player

Jennifer Dent
- Country (sports): United States
- Residence: Grapevine, Texas, U.S.
- Born: February 10, 1981 (age 44) Kansas City, Missouri, U.S.
- Height: 5 ft 7 in (1.70 m)
- Turned pro: 1999
- Retired: 2005
- Plays: Right-handed (two-handed backhand)
- Prize money: US$ 644,372

Singles
- Career record: 226–203
- Career titles: 7 ITF
- Highest ranking: No. 52 (September 24, 2001)

Grand Slam singles results
- Australian Open: 2R (2002)
- French Open: 1R (2000, 2001, 2002)
- Wimbledon: 2R (2004)
- US Open: 2R (2001)

Doubles
- Career record: 102–118
- Career titles: 1 WTA, 5 ITF
- Highest ranking: No. 55 (August 15, 2005)

Jennifer Dent (born February 10, 1981, as Jennifer Hopkins) is an American former professional tennis player.

== Career ==
She won seven singles titles on the ITF Women's Circuit in her career and nearly cracked the top 50. In 2001, she reached her only WTA Tour singles final in Hobart (which she lost to Italian Rita Grande). In 2003, she played some ITF Circuit events, reaching the final in Atlanta and the semifinals at Dothan. In 2002, she won her only WTA doubles title at Strasbourg, partnering with Jelena Kostanić. However, she has never gone beyond the second round in any of the four major tournaments that make up the Grand Slam. She last played in an ITF tournament in October 2005 in Bangkok.

== Personal life ==
Jennifer married Taylor Dent on December 8, 2006, in Sarasota, Florida. On January 26, 2010, she gave birth to a baby boy named Declan James Phillip Dent. Hopkins and Dent currently reside in Grapevine, Texas. Jennifer, along with Taylor's father, Phil Dent, are opening The Dent Tennis Academy located at The Birch Racquet and Lawn Club
