= Sarah Pitkowski-Malcor =

French tennis player

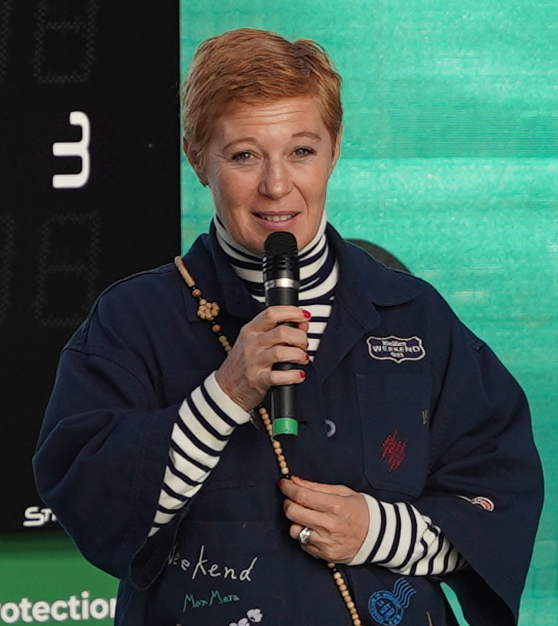
- Country (sports): France
- Residence: Paris
- Born: 13 November 1975 (age 50) Seclin, France
- Height: 1.59 m (5 ft 2 1/2 in)
- Turned pro: 1993
- Retired: 2001
- Plays: Right (two-handed backhand)
- Prize money: $823,787

Singles
- Career record: 278–198
- Career titles: 1 WTA, 10 ITF
- Highest ranking: No. 29 (1 November 1999)

Grand Slam singles results
- Australian Open: 2R (1995, 2001)
- French Open: 3R (1996)
- Wimbledon: 3R (1999, 2000)
- US Open: 3R (1998)

Doubles
- Career record: 52–101
- Career titles: 1 ITF
- Highest ranking: No. 101 (5 August 1996)

Grand Slam doubles results
- Australian Open: 1R (1996, 1997)
- French Open: 2R (1996, 1998)
- Wimbledon: 1R (1996)
- US Open: 2R (1996)

Sarah Pitkowski-Malcor (born 13 November 1975) is a former professional tennis player from France. Her career-high singles ranking is world No. 29, which she achieved on 1 November 1999.

Pitkowski won her only career singles final in Budapest in the spring of 1999, where she beat Cristina Torrens Valero in the final. She was also the runner-up at the WTA Tour tournament in Antwerp in the same year, where she lost to Justine Henin. She has won a total of ten singles titles on the ITF Women's Circuit but never advanced beyond the third round of any Grand Slam event in singles competition. She represented France in the first round of the Fed Cup in 1998 as a rookie, and saved the defending champions from losing to Belgium by defeating Sabine Appelmans 4–6, 6–4, 6–1.

Pitkowski married the French professional tennis player Olivier Malcor, who has served as a coach for Nicolas Mahut, on 7 July 2001. The couple have a son.

== WTA Tour finals ==
=== Singles: 2 (1 title, 1 runner-up) ===
Legend
Tier I (0–0)
Tier II (0–0)
Tier III (0–0)
Tier IV (1–1)

Result	No.	Date	Tournament	Surface	Opponent	Score
Win	1.	Apr 1999	Budapest Grand Prix, Hungary	Clay	(Spain) Cristina Torrens Valero	6–2, 6–2
Loss	2.	May 1999	Belgian Open, Antwerp	Clay	(Belgium) Justine Henin	1–6, 2–6

== Grand Slam singles performance timeline ==
Key
W	F	SF	QF	#R	RR	Q#	DNQ	A	NH

(W) winner; (F) finalist; (SF) semifinalist; (QF) quarterfinalist; (#R) rounds 4, 3, 2, 1; (RR) round-robin stage; (Q#) qualification round; (DNQ) did not qualify; (A) absent; (NH) not held; (SR) strike rate (events won / competed); (W–L) win–loss record.

Tournament	1993	1994	1995	1996	1997	1998	1999	2000	2001	Career W–L
Australian Open	A	A	2R	1R	1R	1R	1R	1R	2R	2–7
French Open	1R	A	2R	3R	2R	1R	1R	1R	1R	4–8
Wimbledon	A	A	1R	A	2R	1R	3R	3R	1R	5–6
US Open	A	A	1R	2R	2R	3R	2R	1R	A	5–6
Win–loss	0–1	0–0	2–4	3–3	3–4	2–4	3–4	2–4	1–3	16–27

== ITF Circuit finals ==
$50,000 tournaments
$25,000 tournaments
$10,000 tournaments

=== Singles (10–4) ===
Result	No.	Date	Tournament	Surface	Opponent	Score
Win	1.	10 February 1992	ITF Swindon, United Kingdom	Carpet (i)	(Belgium) Caroline Wuillot	6–2, 6–4
Loss	2.	17 February 1992	ITF Reims, France	Carpet (i)	(Belgium) Caroline Wuillot	4–6, 1–6
Loss	3.	27 April 1992	ITF Lerida, Spain	Clay	(Argentina) Paola Suárez	6–4, 4–6, 1–6
Win	4.	26 October 1992	ITF Madeira, Portugal	Hard	(France) Angelique Olivier	6–3, 3–6, 6–1
Loss	5.	30 November 1992	ITF Le Havre, France	Clay (i)	(Romania) Ruxandra Dragomir	6–7, 5–7
Loss	6.	1 March 1993	ITF Cascais, Portugal	Clay	(Italy) Ginevra Mugnaini	2–6, 4–6
Win	7.	7 June 1993	ITF Caserta, Italy	Clay	(Paraguay) Rossana de los Ríos	7–5, 6–3
Win	8.	28 February 1994	ITF Madrid, Spain	Clay	(Spain) Ángeles Montolio	6–4, 6–3
Win	9.	28 March 1994	ITF Moulins, France	Hard (i)	(France) Angelique Olivier	7–5, 6–4
Win	10.	14 August 1995	ITF Koksijde, Belgium	Clay	(Spain) Magüi Serna	6–1, 6–3
Win	11.	4 December 1995	ITF Cergy-Pontoise, France	Hard (i)	(Madagascar) Dally Randriantefy	5–7, 6–1, 6–2
Win	12.	23 March 1997	ITF Reims, France	Clay (i)	(Bulgaria) Svetlana Krivencheva	7–5, 6–1
Win	13.	23 August 1998	Bronx Open, United States	Hard	(Zimbabwe) Cara Black	6–3, 7–5
Win	14.	6 December 1998	ITF Cergy-Pontoise, France	Hard (i)	(France) Nathalie Dechy	7–5, 3–6, 7–6^{(7–4)}

=== Doubles (1–1) ===
Result	No.	Date	Tournament	Surface	Partner	Opponents	Score
Loss	1.	23 August 1998	Bronx Open, United States	Hard	(Greece) Christína Papadáki	(United Kingdom) Julie Pullin (United Kingdom) Lorna Woodroffe	3–6, 1–6
Win	2.	30 July 2001	Open Saint-Gaudens, France	Clay	(Kazakhstan) Irina Selyutina	(Spain) Lourdes Domínguez Lino (Spain) Gisela Riera	6–2, 6–3
