= Kristina Brandi =

Puerto Rican tennis player

- Country (sports): Puerto Rico
- Born: March 29, 1977 (age 48) San Juan, Puerto Rico
- Turned pro: 1995
- Retired: 2007
- Plays: Right-handed
- Prize money: $1,248,528

Singles
- Career record: 441–333
- Career titles: 1 WTA, 16 ITF
- Highest ranking: No. 27 (December 4, 2000)

Grand Slam singles results
- Australian Open: 4R (2000)
- French Open: 2R (2000, 2005)
- Wimbledon: 4R (2000)
- US Open: 2R (1996, 2000, 2004)

Other tournaments
- Olympic Games: 2R (2004)

Doubles
- Career record: 48–86
- Career titles: 1 ITF
- Highest ranking: No. 246 (June 19, 1995)

Grand Slam doubles results
- Australian Open: 2R (2006)
- French Open: 1R (2005)
- Wimbledon: 1R (2005)
- US Open: 1R (1999, 2005)
Medal record
Pan American Games
| Silver medal – second place | 2003 Santo Domingo | Doubles |
| Bronze medal – third place | 2003 Santo Domingo | Singles |

Kristina Brandi (born March 29, 1977) is a Puerto Rican former tennis player. She was the first tennis player representing Puerto Rico to win a singles match in an Olympic tennis tournament.

Some of Brandi's career highlights: She achieved her best ranking in singles of number 27 on 4 December 2000, and her highest rank for doubles of number 246 in June 1995. Brandi won one career singles title, in 1999 on grass at 's Hertogenbosch in the Netherlands.

== Career ==
=== Early years ===
Brandi was born and raised in San Juan, Puerto Rico, where she became interested in the sport of tennis at an early age. She made her professional debut in 1995 when she was 17 years old. Her father is Joe Brandi, who coached Pete Sampras.

=== USTA Circuit ===
In 2003, Brandi won the most titles of any woman on the "USTA Circuit". She took home trophies from six events. Brandi was a member of the 2003 Puerto Rican Fed Cup team where she captured the singles championship at the $75k event in Albuquerque, New Mexico, plus the $50k event in Troy, Alabama and the $25k event in Peachtree City, Georgia.

=== 2004 Olympics ===
Brandi represented Puerto Rico in the 2004 Summer Olympics in Athens, Greece. She became the first tennis player representing Puerto Rico to win a singles match in an Olympic tournament when she beat Jelena Kostanić from Croatia (7–5, 6–1). She lost in the second round to Russian Anastasia Myskina.

=== Later years ===
Kristina Brandi resides in Tampa, Florida and continued to be active on the WTA Tour for many years after the 2004 Olympic Games.

Brandi defended her ITF-Surbiton title, defeating Laura Granville from the U.S. Brandi's grass-court season for 2006 at the WTA Tour level included the main draw of the Birmingham tournament, as well as the qualifying tournament at Eastbourne, before heading to compete in the Wimbledon Championships main draw.

Brandi, who has since retired, is the niece of Andy Brandi who played for the Trinity Tigers men's tennis team in NCAA Division I competition.

== WTA career finals ==
=== Singles: 1 (1 title) ===
| Result | Date | Tier | Tournament | Surface | Opponent | Score |
|---|---|---|---|---|---|---|
| Win | 20 June 1999 | Tier III | Rosmalen Championships, Netherlands | Grass | (Croatia) Silvija Talaja | 6–0, 3–6, 6–1 |

== ITF Circuit finals ==
=== Singles: 25 (16 titles, 9 runner-ups) ===
| Legend $100,000 tournaments $75,000 tournaments $50,000 tournaments $25,000 tournaments $10,000 tournaments | Finals by surface Hard (13–8) Clay (0–0) Grass (3–1) Carpet (0–0) |

| Result | No. | Date | Tournament | Surface | Opponent | Score |
|---|---|---|---|---|---|---|
| Win | 1. | 4 July 1994 | ITF Indianapolis, United States | Hard | (United States) Mashona Washington | 6–1, 6–3 |
| Loss | 2. | 25 July 1994 | ITF Roanoke, United States | Hard | (Japan) Keiko Nagatomi | 6–7, 3–6 |
| Loss | 3. | 9 October 1995 | ITF Sedona, United States | Hard | (United States) Tami Whitlinger | 4–6, 4–6 |
| Loss | 4. | 6 April 1997 | ITF Phoenix, United States | Hard | (China) Li Fang | 1–6, 2–6 |
| Win | 5. | 26 January 1998 | ITF Clearwater, United States | Hard | (United States) Mashona Washington | 6–1, 6–2 |
| Win | 6. | 5 April 1998 | ITF Phoenix, United States | Hard | (United States) Lilia Osterloh | 6–0, 6–4 |
| Win | 7. | 20 July 1998 | ITF Peachtree City, United States | Hard | (Luxembourg) Anne Kremer | 6–3, 6–3 |
| Loss | 8. | 2 August 1998 | ITF Salt Lake City, United States | Hard | (South Africa) Mariaan de Swardt | 2–6, 2–6 |
| Win | 9. | 1 November 1998 | ITF Austin, United States | Hard | (United States) Meilen Tu | 3–6, 6–3, 6–4 |
| Win | 10. | 1 August 1999 | ITF Salt Lake City, United States | Hard | (China) Li Fang | 6–4, 6–3 |
| Loss | 11. | 30 April 2000 | ITF Sarasota, United States | Hard | (United States) Meghann Shaughnessy | 1–6, 3–6 |
| Loss | 12. | 4 June 2001 | ITF Surbiton, United Kingdom | Grass | (Japan) Rika Fujiwara | 3–6, 3–6 |
| Win | 13. | 13 May 2003 | ITF Charlottesville, United States | Clay | (Australia) Christina Wheeler | 4–6, 6–4, 6–2 |
| Win | 14. | 8 June 2003 | ITF Surbiton, United Kingdom | Grass | (South Korea) Cho Yoon-jeong | 6–1, 6–3 |
| Win | 15. | 8 July 2003 | ITF College Park, United States | Hard | (Russia) Lioudmila Skavronskaia | 6–1, 6–1 |
| Win | 16. | 28 July 2003 | ITF Louisville, United States | Hard | (United States) Shenay Perry | 3–6, 6–4, 6–4 |
| Win | 17. | 14 September 2003 | ITF Peachtree City, United States | Hard | (United States) Allison Bradshaw | 6–0, 6–1 |
| Win | 18. | 22 September 2003 | ITF Albuquerque, United States | Hard | (Venezuela) Milagros Sequera | 6–2, 6–2 |
| Win | 19. | 5 October 2003 | ITF Troy, United States | Hard | (Italy) Maria Elena Camerin | 7–6^{(7)}, 6–3 |
| Loss | 20. | 19 October 2003 | ITF Sedona, United States | Hard | (Puerto Rico) Samantha Reeves | 5–7, 6–1, 4–6 |
| Win | 21. | 4 June 2005 | ITF Surbiton, United Kingdom | Grass | (United States) Laura Granville | 6–3, 6–1 |
| Loss | 22. | 2 October 2005 | ITF Ashland, United States | Hard | (Thailand) Napaporn Tongsalee | 4–6, 6–2, 4–6 |
| Win | 23. | 16 October 2005 | ITF San Francisco, United States | Hard | (United States) Lilia Osterloh | 5–7, 6–4, 6–4 |
| Win | 24. | 10 June 2006 | ITF Surbiton, United Kingdom | Grass | (United States) Laura Granville | 7–5, 6–0 |
| Loss | 25. | 19 September 2006 | ITF Albuquerque, United States | Hard | Ahsha Rolle | 2–6, 4–6 |

=== Doubles: 6 (1 title, 5 runner-ups) ===
$100,000 tournaments
$75,000 tournaments
$50,000 tournaments
$25,000 tournaments
$10,000 tournaments

| Result | No. | Date | Tournament | Surface | Partner | Opponents | Score |
|---|---|---|---|---|---|---|---|
| Loss | 1. | 20 June 1994 | ITF Hilton Head, United States | Clay | (United States) Karin Miller | (United States) Angela Lettiere (United States) Stacy Sheppard | 6–4, 2–6, 6–7 |
| Win | 2. | 4 July 1994 | ITF Indianapolis, United States | Hard | (United States) Karin Miller | (United States) Angela Lettiere (Russia) Vera Vitels | 6–2, 4–6, 7–6 |
| Loss | 3. | 25 July 1994 | ITF Roanoke, United States | Hard | (United States) Karin Miller | (Australia) Gail Biggs (New Zealand) Claudine Toleafoa | 6–4, 3–6, 5–7 |
| Loss | 4. | 1 February 1998 | ITF Clearwater, United States | Hard | (United States) Karin Miller | (Canada) Maureen Drake (Canada) Renata Kolbovic | 6–4, 3–6, 4–6 |
| Loss | 5. | 10 September 2002 | ITF Peachtree City, United States | Hard | (United States) Allison Baker | (United States) Jennifer Russell (Australia) Christina Wheeler | 2–6, 6–7^{(3)} |
| Loss | 6. | 8 July 2003 | ITF College Park, United States | Hard | (South Africa) Kim Grant | (United States) Jennifer Russell (Australia) Lisa McShea | 2–6, 6–4, 5–7 |

== See also ==
- List of Puerto Ricans
- Corsican immigration to Puerto Rico
- History of women in Puerto Rico
- Sports in Puerto Rico
