= 2000 IGA SuperThrift Tennis Classic =

Women's indoor tennis tournament

- Date: February 21–27
- Edition: 15th
- Category: Tier III
- Draw: 30S / 16D
- Prize money: $170,000
- Surface: Carpet (Supreme) / indoor
- Location: Oklahoma City, OK, U.S.
- Venue: The Greens Country Club

Champions

Singles
- (United States) Monica Seles

Doubles
- (United States) Corina Morariu / (United States) Kimberly Po
← 1999 ·	IGA SuperThrift Tennis Classic	· 2001 →

The 2000 IGA SuperThrift Tennis Classic was a women's tennis tournament played on indoor carpet courts at The Greens Country Club in Oklahoma City, Oklahoma in the United States that was part of the Tier III category of the 2000 WTA Tour. It was the 15th edition of the tournament and was held from February 21 through February 27, 2000. Second-seeded Monica Seles won the singles title and earned $27,000 first-prize money.

== Finals ==
=== Singles ===
(United States) Monica Seles defeated (France) Nathalie Dechy, 6–1, 7–6^{(7–3)}

- It was Seles' 1st singles title of the year and the 45th of her career.

=== Doubles ===
(United States) Corina Morariu / (United States) Kimberly Po defeated (Thailand) Tamarine Tanasugarn / (Ukraine) Elena Tatarkova, 6–4, 4–6, 6–2
