= 1999 IGA SuperThrift Tennis Classic – Doubles =

Doubles
- 1999 IGA SuperThrift Tennis Classic

Final
- Champions: (United States) Lisa Raymond (Australia) Rennae Stubbs
- Runners-up: (South Africa) Amanda Coetzer (South Africa) Jessica Steck
- Score: 6–3, 6–4

Details
- Draw: 16
- Seeds: 4

Events
Singles	Doubles
← 1998 ·	U.S. National Indoor Championships	· 2000 →

The 1999 IGA SuperThrift Classic doubles was the doubles event of the fourteenth edition of the IGA SuperThrift Classic; a WTA Tier III tournament held in Oklahoma City, United States. Serena Williams and Venus Williams were the reigning champions but did not compete that year.

Lisa Raymond and Rennae Stubbs won in the final 6–3, 6–4 against Amanda Coetzer and Jessica Steck.

== Seeds ==
1. (United States) Lisa Raymond / (Australia) Rennae Stubbs (champions)
2. (South Africa) Mariaan de Swardt / (Russia) Anna Kournikova (semifinals, withdrew)
3. (United States) Katrina Adams / (United States) Debbie Graham (first round)
4. (Australia) Kristine Kunce / (United States) Kimberly Po (quarterfinals)

== Draw ==
=== Key ===
- Q = Qualifier
- WC = Wild card
- LL = Lucky loser
- Alt = Alternate
- ITF = ITF entry
- PR = Protected ranking
- SR = Special ranking
- SE = Special exempt
- JE = Junior exempt
- JR = Junior Accelerator Programme entrant
- CO = College Accelerator Programme entrant
- NG = Next Gen Accelerator Program entrant
- w/o = Walkover
- r = Retired
- d = Defaulted

First round
1	(United States) L Raymond (Australia) R Stubbs	6	6
(United States) E deLone (Germany) E Wagner	1	3
(Japan) M Saeki (Japan) Y Yoshida	1	6	7
(United States) A Frazier (United States) K Schlukebir	6	4	5
3	(United States) K Adams (United States) D Graham	3	5
(United States) L McNeil (United States) L Wild	6	7
(United States) C Rubin (United States) M Washington	6	7
(South Africa) N de Villiers (South Africa) L Horn	4	5
(Netherlands) K Boogert (France) A Dechaume-Balleret	3	6^{6}
WC	(South Africa) A Coetzer (South Africa) J Steck	6	7^{8}
(Romania) C Cristea (Australia) A Molik	5	1
4	(Australia) K Kunce (United States) K Po	7	6
(Belarus) O Barabanschikova (Zimbabwe) C Black	3	6	6
(Japan) N Miyagi (Australia) N Pratt	6	4	4
Q	(Australia) A Ellwood (United States) B Rippner	3	4
2	(South Africa) M de Swardt (Russia) A Kournikova	6	6

Quarterfinals
1	(United States) L Raymond (Australia) R Stubbs	6	6
(Japan) M Saeki (Japan) Y Yoshida	4	4
(United States) L McNeil (United States) L Wild	6	7^{9}
(United States) C Rubin (United States) M Washington	3	6^{7}
WC	(South Africa) A Coetzer (South Africa) J Steck	6	3	7
4	(Australia) K Kunce (United States) K Po	3	6	5
(Belarus) O Barabanschikova (Zimbabwe) C Black	1	4
2	(South Africa) M de Swardt (Russia) A Kournikova	6	6

Semifinals
1	(United States) L Raymond (Australia) R Stubbs	6	6
(United States) L McNeil (United States) L Wild	2	2
WC	(South Africa) A Coetzer (South Africa) J Steck	w/o
2	(South Africa) M de Swardt (Russia) A Kournikova

Final
1	(United States) L Raymond (Australia) R Stubbs	6	6
WC	(South Africa) A Coetzer (South Africa) J Steck	3	4

== Qualifying ==
=== Seeds ===
1. (United States) Sandra Cacic / (Poland) Aleksandra Olsza (qualifying competition)
2. (South Africa) Kim Grant / (United States) Lilia Osterloh (second round)

=== Qualifiers ===
1. (Australia) Annabel Ellwood / (United States) Brie Rippner

== Qualifying draw ==
=== Key ===
- Q = Qualifier
- WC = Wild card
- LL = Lucky loser
- Alt = Alternate
- ITF = ITF entry
- PR = Protected ranking
- SR = Special ranking
- SE = Special exempt
- JE = Junior exempt
- JR = Junior Accelerator Programme entrant
- CO = College Accelerator Programme entrant
- NG = Next Gen Accelerator Program entrant
- w/o = Walkover
- r = Retired
- d = Defaulted

First round
1	(United States) Sandra Cacic (Poland) Aleksandra Olsza
Bye
(United States) Tara Snyder (United States) Alexandra Stevenson
Bye
(Australia) Annabel Ellwood (United States) Brie Rippner	8
(United States) Tracy Singian (United States) Jackie Trail	4
Bye
2	(South Africa) Kim Grant (United States) Lilia Osterloh

Second round
1	(United States) Sandra Cacic (Poland) Aleksandra Olsza	6
(United States) Tara Snyder (United States) Alexandra Stevenson	3^{r}
(Australia) Annabel Ellwood (United States) Brie Rippner	8
2	(South Africa) Kim Grant (United States) Lilia Osterloh	6

Qualifying competition
1	(United States) Sandra Cacic (Poland) Aleksandra Olsza	7
(Australia) Annabel Ellwood (United States) Brie Rippner	9
