= 1999 IGA SuperThrift Tennis Classic – Singles =

Singles
- 1999 IGA SuperThrift Tennis Classic

Final
- Champion: (United States) Venus Williams
- Runner-up: (South Africa) Amanda Coetzer
- Score: 6–4, 6–0

Details
- Draw: 30
- Seeds: 8

Events
Singles	Doubles
← 1998 ·	U.S. National Indoor Championships	· 2000 →

The 1999 IGA SuperThrift Classic singles was the singles event of the fourteenth edition of the IGA SuperThrift Classic; a WTA Tier III tournament held in Oklahoma City, United States. First-seded Venus Williams was the defending champion and won in the final 6–4, 6–0 against third-seeded Amanda Coetzer.

== Seeds ==
The top two seeds received a bye to the second round.

1. (United States) Venus Williams (champion)
2. (Russia) Anna Kournikova (semifinals)
3. (South Africa) Amanda Coetzer (final)
4. (United States) Lisa Raymond (first round)
5. (United States) Chanda Rubin (quarterfinals)
6. (United States) Amy Frazier (first round)
7. (South Africa) Mariaan de Swardt (first round)
8. (United States) Tara Snyder (first round)

== Draw ==
=== Key ===
- Q = Qualifier
- WC = Wild card
- LL = Lucky loser
- Alt = Alternate
- SE = Special exempt
- PR = Protected ranking
- ITF = ITF entry
- JE = Junior exempt
- w/o = Walkover
- r = Retired
- d = Defaulted
- SR = Special ranking

=== Finals ===
Semifinals
1	(United States) Venus Williams	6	6
Q	(United States) Lilia Osterloh	2	3
3	(South Africa) Amanda Coetzer	6	6
2	(Russia) Anna Kournikova	4	2

Final
1	(United States) Venus Williams	6	6
3	(South Africa) Amanda Coetzer	4	0

=== Top half ===
First round
(Netherlands) K Boogert	4	2
(United States) K Po	6	6
(Belarus) O Barabanschikova	6	1	2
(Russia) T Panova	3	6	6
WC	(United States) A Stevenson	7	7^{7}
7	(South Africa) M de Swardt	5	6^{5}
4	(United States) L Raymond	6	2	2
Q	(United States) L Osterloh	2	6	6
WC	(United States) L McNeil	5	4
(Japan) M Saeki	7	6
Q	(United States) M Washington	7^{7}	6
(Romania) C Cristea	6^{4}	4
(United States) J Chi	3	7^{9}	7
6	(United States) A Frazier	6	6^{7}	5

Second round
1	(United States) V Williams	6	7^{7}
(United States) K Po	1	6^{3}
(Russia) T Panova	6	6^{4}	5
WC	(United States) A Stevenson	2	7^{7}	7
Q	(United States) L Osterloh	6	6
(Japan) M Saeki	4	3
Q	(United States) M Washington	6^{6}	3
(United States) J Chi	7^{8}	6

Quarterfinals
1	(United States) V Williams	7	6
WC	(United States) A Stevenson	5	3
Q	(United States) L Osterloh	3	6	6
(United States) J Chi	6	4	4

Semifinals
1	(United States) V Williams	6	6
Q	(United States) L Osterloh	2	3

=== Bottom half ===
First round
8	(United States) T Snyder	3	2
(Zimbabwe) C Black	6	6
(France) A Dechaume-Balleret	7	6
(Luxembourg) A Kremer	5	4
(Canada) J Nejedly	4	2
(Germany) E Wagner	6	6
Q	(Japan) N Miyagi	6	6^{4}	4
3	(South Africa) A Coetzer	4	7^{7}	6
5	(United States) C Rubin	6	7^{7}
(United Kingdom) S Smith	3	6^{2}
(United States) M Shaughnessy	3	6^{6}
Q	(Australia) N Pratt	6	7^{8}
(Puerto Rico) K Brandi	7^{7}	6
(Spain) M Sánchez Lorenzo	6^{3}	2

Second round
(Zimbabwe) C Black	7^{7}	7^{7}
(France) A Dechaume-Balleret	6^{5}	6^{5}
(Germany) E Wagner	1	3
3	(South Africa) A Coetzer	6	6
5	(United States) C Rubin	6	6
Q	(Australia) N Pratt	3	2
(Puerto Rico) K Brandi	3	1
2	(Russia) A Kournikova	6	6

Quarterfinals
(Zimbabwe) C Black	3	7^{7}	3
3	(South Africa) A Coetzer	6	6^{5}	6
5	(United States) C Rubin	5	6	3
2	(Russia) A Kournikova	7	0	6

Semifinals
3	(South Africa) A Coetzer	6	6
2	(Russia) A Kournikova	4	2

== Qualifying ==
=== Seeds ===
1. (United States) Brie Rippner (qualifying competition)
2. (Australia) Nicole Pratt (Qualifier)
3. (United States) Sandra Cacic (first round)
4. (Bulgaria) Pavlina Stoyanova (first round)
5. (United States) Jolene Watanabe (second round)
6. (United States) Karin Miller (first round)
7. (Poland) Aleksandra Olsza (first round)
8. (Japan) Nana Miyagi (Qualifier)

=== Qualifiers ===
1. (United States) Lilia Osterloh
2. (United States) Mashona Washington
3. (Japan) Nana Miyagi
4. (Australia) Nicole Pratt

== Qualifying draw ==
=== Key ===
- Q = Qualifier
- WC = Wild card
- LL = Lucky loser
- Alt = Alternate
- SE = Special exempt
- PR = Protected ranking
- ITF = ITF entry
- JE = Junior exempt
- w/o = Walkover
- r = Retired
- d = Defaulted
- SR = Special ranking

=== First qualifier ===
First round
1	(United States) Brie Rippner	6	6
(United States) Aurandrea Narváez	0	1
(Japan) Yuka Yoshida	7	6
(United States) Katie Schlukebir	5	4
(United States) Tracy Singian	6	6
(South Africa) Kim Grant	4	4
(United States) Lilia Osterloh	6	6
7	(Poland) Aleksandra Olsza	2	1

Second round
1	(United States) Brie Rippner	6	6
(Japan) Yuka Yoshida	3	4
(United States) Tracy Singian	1	1
(United States) Lilia Osterloh	6	6

Qualifying competition
1	(United States) Brie Rippner	6^{4}	2
(United States) Lilia Osterloh	7^{7}	6

=== Second qualifier ===
First round
4	(Bulgaria) Pavlina Stoyanova	2	3
(United States) Mashona Washington	6	6
(United States) Meilen Tu	6	6
(Australia) Annabel Ellwood	4	3
(Italy) Francesca Lubiani	6^{4}	6	2
(Australia) Kristine Kunce	7^{7}	3	6
(South Africa) Esmé de Villiers	2	1
5	(United States) Jolene Watanabe	6	6

Second round
(United States) Mashona Washington	2	6	6
(United States) Meilen Tu	6	1	3
(Australia) Kristine Kunce	3	6	6
5	(United States) Jolene Watanabe	6	2	4

Qualifying competition
(United States) Mashona Washington	4	6	6
(Australia) Kristine Kunce	6	1	1

=== Third qualifier ===
First round
8	(Japan) Nana Miyagi	6	7
(United States) Jill Craybas	3	5
(United States) Jennifer Hopkins	7^{7}	6
(Australia) Jelena Dokić	6^{4}	4
(Israel) Hila Rosen	1	6	6
(United States) Julie Scott	6	4	2
(United States) Jackie Trail	6	7^{8}
3	(United States) Sandra Cacic	2	6^{6}

Second round
8	(Japan) Nana Miyagi	7	6
(United States) Jennifer Hopkins	5	2
(Israel) Hila Rosen	6	6
(United States) Jackie Trail	4	4

Qualifying competition
8	(Japan) Nana Miyagi	6	4	6
(Israel) Hila Rosen	4	6	0

=== Fourth qualifier ===
First round
6	(United States) Karin Miller	5	1
(United States) Erika deLone	7	6
(United States) Linda Wild	6	6^{8}	6
(United States) Debbie Graham	4	7^{10}	3
(United States) Katrina Nimmers	6	7^{7}
(United States) Megan Russell	4	6^{4}
(Australia) Alicia Molik	2	1
2	(Australia) Nicole Pratt	6	6

Second round
(United States) Erika deLone	5	1
(United States) Linda Wild	7	6
(United States) Katrina Nimmers	0	0
2	(Australia) Nicole Pratt	6	6

Qualifying competition
(United States) Linda Wild	1	2
2	(Australia) Nicole Pratt	6	6
