= 2002 Kroger St. Jude International – Women's singles =

Women's singles
- 2002 Kroger St. Jude International

Final
- Champion: (United States) Lisa Raymond
- Runner-up: (United States) Alexandra Stevenson
- Score: 4–6, 6–3, 7–6^{(11–9)}

Details
- Draw: 30
- Seeds: 8

Events
Singles	men	women
Doubles	men	women
← 2001 ·	U.S. National Indoor Championships	· 2003 →

Monica Seles was the reigning champion but did not compete this year, as she decided to play in Dubai in the same week.

Lisa Raymond won the title by defeating Alexandra Stevenson 4–6, 6–3, 7–6^{(11–9)} in the final.

== Seeds ==
The first two seeds received a bye into the second round.

1. (South Africa) Amanda Coetzer (second round)
2. (United States) Lisa Raymond (champion)
3. (Japan) Ai Sugiyama (semifinals)
4. (United States) Alexandra Stevenson (final)
5. (Italy) Adriana Serra Zanetti (quarterfinals)
6. (United States) ~~Meilen Tu~~ (withdrew)
7. (United States) Jennifer Hopkins (second round)
8. (United States) Marissa Irvin (first round)
9. (Kazakhstan) Irina Selyutina (second round, withdrew)

== Draw ==
=== Key ===
- Q = Qualifier
- WC = Wild card
- LL = Lucky loser
- Alt = Alternate
- SE = Special exempt
- PR = Protected ranking
- ITF = ITF entry
- JE = Junior exempt
- w/o = Walkover
- r = Retired
- d = Defaulted
- SR = Special ranking

=== Finals ===
Semifinals
(Russia) Alina Jidkova	1	2
4	(United States) Alexandra Stevenson	6	6
3	(Japan) Ai Sugiyama	2	1
2	(United States) Lisa Raymond	6	6

Finals
4	(United States) Alexandra Stevenson	6	3	6^{9}
2	(United States) Lisa Raymond	4	6	7^{11}

=== Top half ===
First round
(Russia) A Jidkova	6	3	6
(United States) S Reeves	2	6	2
(Canada) J Nejedly	7^{7}	6
(Netherlands) S Noorlander	6^{3}	2
(Germany) A Glass	4	4
7	(United States) J Hopkins	6	6
4	(United States) A Stevenson	7^{7}	4	7^{7}
Q	(Russia) V Zvonareva	6^{4}	6	6^{5}
(South Korea) Y-j Cho	6	7^{7}
(United States) S Taylor	3	6^{5}
(Croatia) S Talaja	6	6
(Indonesia) W Prakusya	0	1
WC	(United States) N Pitts	4	2
9	(Kazakhstan) I Selyutina	6	6

Second round
1	(South Africa) A Coetzer	3	6^{5}
(Russia) A Jidkova	6	7^{7}
(Canada) J Nejedly	6	4	6
7	(United States) J Hopkins	4	6	1
4	(United States) A Stevenson	6	4	6
(South Korea) Y-j Cho	2	6	3
(Croatia) S Talaja	w/o
9	(Kazakhstan) I Selyutina

Quarterfinals
(Russia) A Jidkova	7^{7}	6
(Canada) J Nejedly	6^{5}	2
4	(United States) A Stevenson	6	4	6
(Croatia) S Talaja	1	6	2

Semifinals
(Russia) A Jidkova	1	2
4	(United States) A Stevenson	6	6

=== Bottom half ===
First round
5	(Italy) Ad Serra Zanetti	6	3	6
WC	(Croatia) M Lučić	0	6	2
Q	(Italy) An Serra Zanetti	2	4
LL	(United States) E deLone	6	6
(Italy) F Pennetta	4	2
Q	(Japan) S Asagoe	6	6
(Japan) S Obata	6^{6}	4
3	(Japan) A Sugiyama	7^{8}	6
8	(United States) M Irvin	4	4
(Hungary) A Kapros	6	6
(United States) J Craybas	6	2	6
(Germany) A Barna	4	6	4
Q	(Canada) MÈ Pelletier	3	6	0
(Hungary) Z Gubacsi	6	3	6

Second round
5	(Italy) Ad Serra Zanetti	6^{3}	6	6
LL	(United States) E deLone	7^{7}	3	4
Q	(Japan) S Asagoe	2	6^{3}
3	(Japan) A Sugiyama	6	7^{7}
(Hungary) A Kapros	6	4	4
(United States) J Craybas	2	6	6
(Hungary) Z Gubacsi	1	1
2	(United States) L Raymond	6	6

Quarterfinals
5	(Italy) Ad Serra Zanetti	0	4
3	(Japan) A Sugiyama	6	6
(United States) J Craybas	4	4
2	(United States) L Raymond	6	6

Semifinals
3	(Japan) A Sugiyama	2	1
2	(United States) L Raymond	6	6
