= 2002 Kroger St. Jude International – Women's doubles =

Women's doubles
- 2002 Kroger St. Jude International

Final
- Champions: (Japan) Ai Sugiyama (Ukraine) Elena Tatarkova
- Runners-up: (United States) Melissa Middleton (United States) Brie Rippner
- Score: 6–4, 2–6, 6–0

Details
- Draw: 16
- Seeds: 4

Events
Singles	men	women
Doubles	men	women
← 2001 ·	U.S. National Indoor Championships	· 2003 →

Amanda Coetzer and Lori McNeil were the defending champions, but McNeil did not compete this year. Coetzer teamed up with Jessica Steck and lost in first round to sisters Adriana Serra Zanetti and Antonella Serra Zanetti.

Ai Sugiyama and Elena Tatarkova won the title by defeating Melissa Middleton and Brie Rippner 6–4, 2–6, 6–0 in the final.

== Seeds ==
1. (Japan) Ai Sugiyama / (Ukraine) Elena Tatarkova (champions)
2. (Chinese Taipei) Janet Lee / (Indonesia) Wynne Prakusya (semifinals)
3. (South Africa) Nannie de Villiers / (Kazakhstan) Irina Selyutina (first round)
4. (Japan) Rika Hiraki / (Japan) Nana Miyagi (first round)

== Draw ==
=== Key ===
- Q = Qualifier
- WC = Wild card
- LL = Lucky loser
- Alt = Alternate
- SE = Special exempt
- PR = Protected ranking
- ITF = ITF entry
- JE = Junior exempt
- w/o = Walkover
- r = Retired
- d = Defaulted
- SR = Special ranking

=== Draw ===
First round
1	(Japan) A Sugiyama (Ukraine) E Tatarkova	6	4	6
Q	(United States) J Craybas (United States) J Hopkins	1	6	1
(South Africa) A Coetzer (South Africa) J Steck	1	4
(Italy) Ad Serra Zanetti (Italy) An Serra Zanetti	6	6
4	(Japan) R Hiraki (Japan) N Miyagi	4	4
(United States) E deLone (United States) K Schlukebir	6	6
(Russia) A Jidkova (Australia) B Stewart	6	2	4
(United States) M Irvin (United States) A Stevenson	1	6	6
WC	(Croatia) M Lučić (Canada) MÈ Pelletier	4	6^{5}
(United States) M Middleton (United States) B Rippner	6	7^{7}
(Germany) A Glass (United States) S Reeves	7^{7}	6
3	(South Africa) N de Villiers (Kazakhstan) I Selyutina	6^{3}	3
(Japan) S Asagoe (Bulgaria) S Krivencheva	3	4
(Netherlands) A Hopmans (Ukraine) T Perebiynis	6	6
(Australia) C Barclay (Australia) C Wheeler	6	5	3
2	(Chinese Taipei) J Lee (Indonesia) W Prakusya	3	7	6

Quarterfinals
1	(Japan) A Sugiyama (Ukraine) E Tatarkova	6	6
(Italy) Ad Serra Zanetti (Italy) An Serra Zanetti	1	2
(United States) E deLone (United States) K Schlukebir	4	4
(United States) M Irvin (United States) A Stevenson	6	6
(United States) M Middleton (United States) B Rippner	6	7^{7}
(Germany) A Glass (United States) S Reeves	2	6^{2}
(Netherlands) A Hopmans (Ukraine) T Perebiynis	3	7	2
2	(Chinese Taipei) J Lee (Indonesia) W Prakusya	6	5	6

Semifinals
1	(Japan) A Sugiyama (Ukraine) E Tatarkova	6	6
(United States) M Irvin (United States) A Stevenson	4	4
(United States) M Middleton (United States) B Rippner	6	6^{9}	6
2	(Chinese Taipei) J Lee (Indonesia) W Prakusya	4	7^{11}	3

Final
1	(Japan) A Sugiyama (Ukraine) E Tatarkova	6	2	6
(United States) M Middleton (United States) B Rippner	4	6	0
