= 2001 IGA U.S. Indoor Championships – Singles =

Singles
- 2001 IGA U.S. Indoor Championships
- 2000 Champion: (United States) Monica Seles

Final
- Champion: (United States) Monica Seles
- Runner-up: (United States) Jennifer Capriati
- Score: 6–3, 5–7, 6–2

Details
- Draw: 30
- Seeds: 8

Events
Singles	Doubles
← 2000 ·	IGA U.S. Indoor Championships	· 2002 →

Monica Seles was the defending champion and won in the final 6–3, 5–7, 6–2 against Jennifer Capriati.

== Seeds ==
A champion seed is indicated in bold text while text in italics indicates the round in which that seed was eliminated. The top two seeds received a bye to the second round.

1. (United States) **Monica Seles (champion)**
2. (United States) Jennifer Capriati (final)
3. (South Africa) Amanda Coetzer (second round)
4. (United States) Amy Frazier (first round)
5. (United States) Lisa Raymond (quarterfinals)
6. (Japan) Ai Sugiyama (first round)
7. (Zimbabwe) Cara Black (first round)
8. (Puerto Rico) Kristina Brandi (withdrew)

== Draw ==
=== Key ===
- Q = Qualifier
- WC = Wild card
- LL = Lucky loser
- Alt = Alternate
- SE = Special exempt
- PR = Protected ranking
- ITF = ITF entry
- JE = Junior exempt
- w/o = Walkover
- r = Retired
- d = Defaulted
- SR = Special ranking

=== Final ===
Final
1	(United States) **Monica Seles**	**6**	5	**6**
2	(United States) Jennifer Capriati	3	**7**	2

=== Section 1 ===
First round
(United States) **J Hopkins**	**6**	**6**
LL	(Indonesia) W Prakusya	3	4
(United States) **A Stevenson**	**6**	**6**
(United States) M Irvin	4	2
(Germany) **J Kandarr**	1	**7**	**7**
6	(Japan) A Sugiyama	**6**	5	5
4	(United States) A Frazier	1	**6**	6^{3}
Q	(United States) **S Cacic**	**6**	3	**7^{7}**
Q	(United States) J Craybas	6^{2}	4
(United States) **L Osterloh**	**7^{7}**	**6**
(Japan) **S Asagoe**	**6**	**6**
(Netherlands) Y Basting	2	4
WC	(United States) **A Bradshaw**	4	**7**	**6**
LL	(United States) E deLone	**6**	5	4

Second round
1	(United States) **M Seles**	**7^{7}**	**6**
(United States) J Hopkins	6^{1}	3
(United States) **A Stevenson**	**6**	**7^{9}**
(Germany) J Kandarr	3	6^{7}
Q	(United States) S Cacic	3	2
(United States) **L Osterloh**	**6**	**6**
(Japan) **S Asagoe**	3	**6**	**7^{8}**
WC	(United States) A Bradshaw	**6**	3	6^{6}

Quarterfinals
1	(United States) **M Seles**	**6**	**6**
(United States) A Stevenson	3	4
(United States) L Osterloh	4	1
(Japan) **S Asagoe**	**6**	**6**

Semifinals
1	(United States) **M Seles**	6^{5}	**6**	**6**
(Japan) S Asagoe	**7^{7}**	2	2

=== Section 2 ===
First round
7	(Zimbabwe) C Black	2	**6**	3
Q	(Hungary) **A Kapros**	**6**	2	**6**
(China) F Li	2	0
(Canada) **J Nejedly**	**6**	**6**
(Slovakia) **D Hantuchová**	**6**	**6**
WC	(United States) T Snyder	3	4
(Australia) N Pratt	1	6^{1}
3	(South Africa) **A Coetzer**	**6**	**7^{7}**
5	(United States) **L Raymond**	**6**	**6**
(Russia) A Jidkova	2	2
Q	(Canada) R Kolbovic	1	3
LL	(United States) **D Buth**	**6**	**6**
(Venezuela) **M Vento**	**6**	1	**6**
(Italy) G Casoni	3	**6**	1

Second round
Q	(Hungary) **A Kapros**	4	**6**	**7^{7}**
(Canada) J Nejedly	**6**	1	6^{5}
(Slovakia) **D Hantuchová**	**7^{7}**	3	**6**
3	(South Africa) A Coetzer	6^{0}	**6**	0
5	(United States) **L Raymond**	**6**	**6**
LL	(United States) D Buth	3	0
(Venezuela) M Vento	2	1
2	(United States) **J Capriati**	**6**	**6**

Quarterfinals
Q	(Hungary) A Kapros	4	4
(Slovakia) **D Hantuchová**	**6**	**6**
5	(United States) L Raymond	4	**6**	4
2	(United States) **J Capriati**	**6**	3	**6**

Semifinals
(Slovakia) D Hantuchová	4	**6**	2
2	(United States) **J Capriati**	**6**	3	**6**
