= 2001 IGA U.S. Indoor Championships =

- Date: February 18–25
- Edition: 16th
- Category: Tier III
- Draw: 30S / 16D
- Prize money: $170,000
- Location: Oklahoma City, OK, U.S.

Champions

Singles
- (United States) Monica Seles

Doubles
- (South Africa) Amanda Coetzer / (United States) Lori McNeil
← 2000 ·	IGA U.S. Indoor Championships	· 2002 →

The 2001 IGA U.S. Indoor Championships was a women's tennis tournament played on indoor hard courts in Oklahoma City, Oklahoma in the United States and was part of Tier III of the 2001 WTA Tour. It was the 16th edition of the tournament ran from February 18 through February 25, 2001. First-seeded Monica Seles won her second consecutive singles title at the event.

== Finals ==
=== Singles ===
(United States) Monica Seles defeated (United States) Jennifer Capriati 6–3, 5–7, 6–2

- It was Seles' 1st title of the year and the 50th singles title of her career.

=== Doubles ===
(South Africa) Amanda Coetzer / (United States) Lori McNeil defeated (Chinese Taipei) Janet Lee / (Indonesia) Wynne Prakusya 6–3, 2–6, 6–0

- It was Coetzer's 1st title of the year and the 15th of her career. It was McNeil's 1st title of the year and the 41st of her career.
