= 2001 IGA U.S. Indoor Championships – Doubles =

Doubles
- 2001 IGA U.S. Indoor Championships

Final
- Champions: (South Africa) Amanda Coetzer (United States) Lori McNeil
- Runners-up: (Chinese Taipei) Janet Lee (Indonesia) Wynne Prakusya
- Score: 6–3, 2–6, 6–0

Details
- Draw: 16
- Seeds: 4

Events
Singles	Doubles
← 2000 ·	IGA U.S. Indoor Championships	· 2002 →

Corina Morariu and Kimberly Po were the reigning champions but did not compete that year.

Amanda Coetzer and Lori McNeil won in the final 6–3, 2–6, 6–0 against Janet Lee and Wynne Prakusya.

== Seeds ==
Champion seeds are indicated in bold text while text in italics indicates the round in which those seeds were eliminated.

1. (United States) Lisa Raymond / (Australia) Rennae Stubbs (semifinals)
2. (Zimbabwe) Cara Black / (Australia) Nicole Pratt (semifinals)
3. (Japan) Ai Sugiyama / (Japan) Yuka Yoshida (first round)
4. (South Africa) **Amanda Coetzer** / (United States) **Lori McNeil (champions)**

== Draw ==
=== Key ===
- Q = Qualifier
- WC = Wild card
- LL = Lucky loser
- Alt = Alternate
- SE = Special exempt
- PR = Protected ranking
- ITF = ITF entry
- JE = Junior exempt
- w/o = Walkover
- r = Retired
- d = Defaulted
- SR = Special ranking

First round
1	(United States) **L Raymond** (Australia) **R Stubbs**	**6**	**6**
(United States) L Osterloh (United States) A Stevenson	0	3
(United States) S Cacic (Canada) R Kolbovic	0	1
(United States) **D Buth** (Russia) **A Jidkova**	**6**	**6**
3	(Japan) A Sugiyama (Japan) Y Yoshida	3	6^{3}
(Chinese Taipei) **J Lee** (Indonesia) **W Prakusya**	**6**	**7^{7}**
(Netherlands) **Y Basting** (Slovakia) **D Hantuchová**	**6**	6^{9}	**6**
(Italy) G Casoni (Australia) E Dominikovic	3	**7^{11}**	4
(Japan) **H Inoue** (Japan) **M Inoue**	**6**	**6**
(United States) A Frazier (United States) K Schlukebir	4	2
(United States) E deLone (Ukraine) E Tatarkova	3	**6**	2
4	(South Africa) **A Coetzer** (United States) **L McNeil**	**6**	2	**6**
Q	(United States) **J Craybas** (United States) **S Taylor**	2	**7**	**6**
(South Africa) N Grandin (South Africa) N Rencken	**6**	5	4
WC	(United States) K Brandi (United States) M Washington	4	4
2	(Zimbabwe) **C Black** (Australia) **N Pratt**	**6**	**6**

Quarterfinals
1	(United States) **L Raymond** (Australia) **R Stubbs**	**6**	**6**
(United States) D Buth (Russia) A Jidkova	3	1
(Chinese Taipei) **J Lee** (Indonesia) **W Prakusya**	**6**	**7**
(Netherlands) Y Basting (Slovakia) D Hantuchová	2	5
(Japan) H Inoue (Japan) M Inoue	5	1
4	(South Africa) **A Coetzer** (United States) **L McNeil**	**7**	**6**
Q	(United States) J Craybas (United States) S Taylor	1	0
2	(Zimbabwe) **C Black** (Australia) **N Pratt**	**6**	**6**

Semifinals
1	(United States) L Raymond (Australia) R Stubbs	4	4
(Chinese Taipei) **J Lee** (Indonesia) **W Prakusya**	**6**	**6**
4	(South Africa) **A Coetzer** (United States) **L McNeil**	4	**7^{7}**	**6**
2	(Zimbabwe) C Black (Australia) N Pratt	**6**	6^{3}	4

Final
(Chinese Taipei) Janet Lee (Indonesia) Wynne Prakusya	3	**6**	0
4	(South Africa) **Amanda Coetzer** (United States) **Lori McNeil**	**6**	2	**6**
