= 2002 Kroger St. Jude International =

- Date: February 17–24
- Edition: 32nd (men) / 1st (women)
- Surface: Hard / indoor
- Location: Memphis, Tennessee, U.S.
- Venue: Racquet Club of Memphis

Champions

Men's singles
- (United States) Andy Roddick

Women's singles
- (United States) Lisa Raymond

Men's doubles
- (United States) Brian MacPhie / (Federal Republic of Yugoslavia) Nenad Zimonjić

Women's doubles
- (Japan) Ai Sugiyama / (Ukraine) Elena Tatarkova
← 2001 ·	U.S. National Indoor Championships	· 2003 →

The 2002 Kroger St. Jude International was a tennis tournament played on indoor hard courts at the Racquet Club of Memphis in Memphis, Tennessee in the United States that was part of the International Series Gold of the 2002 ATP Tour and of Tier III of the 2002 WTA Tour. The tournament ran from February 17 through February 24, 2002. Andy Roddick and Lisa Raymond won the singles titles.

== Finals ==
=== Men's singles ===
(United States) Andy Roddick defeated (United States) James Blake 6–4, 3–6, 7–5

- It was Roddick's 1st title of the year and the 5th of his career.

=== Women's singles ===
(United States) Lisa Raymond defeated (United States) Alexandra Stevenson 4–6, 6–3, 7–6^{(11–9)}

- It was Raymond's 2nd title of the year and the 33rd of her career.

=== Men's doubles ===
(United States) Brian MacPhie / (Federal Republic of Yugoslavia) Nenad Zimonjić defeated (United States) Bob Bryan / (United States) Mike Bryan 6–3, 3–6, [10–4]

- It was MacPhie's only title of the year and the 5th of his career. It was Zimonjić's only title of the year and the 5th of his career.

=== Women's doubles ===
(Japan) Ai Sugiyama / (Ukraine) Elena Tatarkova defeated (United States) Melissa Middleton / (United States) Brie Rippner 6–4, 2–6, 6–0

- It was Sugiyama's only title of the year and the 24th of her career. It was Tatarkova's only title of the year and the 2nd of her career.
