= 2001 Kroger St. Jude International – Doubles =

Doubles
- 2001 Kroger St. Jude International

Final
- Champions: (United States) Bob Bryan (United States) Mike Bryan
- Runners-up: (United States) Alex O'Brien (United States) Jonathan Stark
- Score: 6–3, 7–6^{(7–3)}

Details
- Draw: 24
- Seeds: 8

Events
Singles	Doubles
- U.S. National Indoor Championships

Justin Gimelstob and Sébastien Lareau were the defending champions but only Gimelstob competed that year with Jared Palmer.

Gimelstob and Palmer lost in the second round to Tommy Haas and Glenn Weiner.

Bob Bryan and Mike Bryan won their first ATP doubles final 6–3, 7–6^{(7–3)} against Alex O'Brien and Jonathan Stark.

== Seeds ==
All eight seeded teams received byes to the second round.

1. (United States) Justin Gimelstob / (United States) Jared Palmer (second round)
2. (The Bahamas) Mark Knowles / (United States) Brian MacPhie (semifinals)
3. (United States) Alex O'Brien / (United States) Jonathan Stark (final)
4. (United States) Bob Bryan / (United States) Mike Bryan (champions)
5. (Australia) David Macpherson / (South Africa) Grant Stafford (quarterfinals)
6. (Japan) Thomas Shimada / (United States) Jack Waite (quarterfinals)
7. (Sweden) Johan Landsberg / (South Africa) Myles Wakefield (quarterfinals)
8. (Spain) Juan Balcells / (Ecuador) Nicolás Lapentti (quarterfinals)

== Draw ==
Key

- Q = Qualifier
- WC = Wild card
- LL = Lucky loser
- Alt = Alternate
- ITF = ITF entry
- PR = Protected ranking
- SR = Special ranking
- SE = Special exempt
- JE = Junior exempt
- JR = Junior Accelerator Programme entrant
- CO = College Accelerator Programme entrant
- NG = Next Gen Accelerator Program entrant
- w/o = Walkover
- r = Retired
- d = Defaulted

=== Final ===
Semifinals

Final

WC
- (Germany) Tommy Haas
- (United States) Glenn Weiner
4
5

4
- (United States) Bob Bryan
- (United States) Mike Bryan
6
7

4
- (United States) Bob Bryan
- (United States) Mike Bryan
6
7^{7}

3
- (United States) Alex O'Brien
- (United States) Jonathan Stark
3
6^{3}

3
- (United States) Alex O'Brien
- (United States) Jonathan Stark
4
7
6

2
- (The Bahamas) Mark Knowles
- (United States) Brian MacPhie
6
5
4

=== Top half ===
First round

Second round

Quarterfinals

Semifinals

1
- (United States) J Gimelstob
- (United States) J Palmer
3
4

WC
- (Germany) T Haas
- (United States) G Weiner
6
7^{7}

WC
- (Germany) T Haas
- (United States) G Weiner
6
6

- (United States) K Kim
- (South Korea) H-T Lee
3
6^{3}

WC
- (Germany) T Haas
- (United States) G Weiner
4
6
6

- (Australia) W Arthurs
- (Australia) B Ellwood
6
6

8
- (Spain) J Balcells
- (Ecuador) N Lapentti
6
4
3

WC
- (United States) L Jensen
- (United States) M Jensen
2
3

- (Australia) W Arthurs
- (Australia) B Ellwood
4
4

8
- (Spain) J Balcells
- (Ecuador) N Lapentti
6
6

WC
- (Germany) T Haas
- (United States) G Weiner
4
5

4
- (United States) B Bryan
- (United States) M Bryan
6
7

4
- (United States) B Bryan
- (United States) M Bryan
7^{7}
6

- (Italy) A Gaudenzi
- (Croatia) G Ivanišević
6
6

- (Italy) A Gaudenzi
- (Croatia) G Ivanišević
6^{4}
2

WC
- (United States) J-M Gambill
- (United States) T Gambill
2
2

4
- (United States) B Bryan
- (United States) M Bryan
6
7^{7}

Q
- (Switzerland) G Bastl
- (Italy) D Sanguinetti
1
6
4

6
- (Japan) T Shimada
- (United States) J Waite
4
6^{4}

- (South Africa) P Rosner
- (South Africa) J Weir-Smith
6
0
6

- (South Africa) P Rosner
- (South Africa) J Weir-Smith
6
3
6^{4}

6
- (Japan) T Shimada
- (United States) J Waite
4
6
7^{7}

=== Bottom half ===
First round

Second round

Quarterfinals

Semifinals

7
- (Sweden) J Landsberg
- (South Africa) M Wakefield
3
6
6

WC
- (United States) J Blake
- (United States) A Roddick
6
4
6

WC
- (United States) J Blake
- (United States) A Roddick
6
3
4

- (South Africa) N Godwin
- (United States) C Woodruff
4
6
3

7
- (Sweden) J Landsberg
- (South Africa) M Wakefield
5
6^{6}

- (Israel) H Levy
- (Brazil) A Sá
6
4
6

3
- (United States) A O'Brien
- (United States) J Stark
7
7^{8}

- (United States) P Goldstein
- (United States) J Thomas
4
6
4

- (Israel) H Levy
- (Brazil) A Sá
2
3

3
- (United States) A O'Brien
- (United States) J Stark
6
6

3
- (United States) A O'Brien
- (United States) J Stark
4
7
6

2
- (The Bahamas) M Knowles
- (United States) B MacPhie
6
5
4

5
- (Australia) D Macpherson
- (South Africa) G Stafford
6
6

- (Australia) A Kratzmann
- (Italy) L Tieleman
6^{2}
7^{7}
6

- (Australia) A Kratzmann
- (Italy) L Tieleman
2
2

- (United States) D Bowen
- (United States) M Sprengelmeyer
7^{7}
6^{5}
4

5
- (Australia) D Macpherson
- (South Africa) G Stafford
4
3

- (Spain) E Benfele Álvarez
- (Russia) A Stoliarov
6
7^{7}

2
- (The Bahamas) M Knowles
- (United States) B MacPhie
6
6

- (South Africa) B Haygarth
- (South Africa) M Ondruska
3
6^{4}

- (Spain) E Benfele Álvarez
- (Russia) A Stoliarov
3
3

2
- (The Bahamas) M Knowles
- (United States) B MacPhie
6
6
