= 1999 IGA SuperThrift Tennis Classic =

- Date: February 22–28
- Edition: 14th
- Category: Tier III
- Draw: 30S / 16D
- Prize money: $180,000
- Surface: Hard / indoor
- Location: Oklahoma City, OK, U.S.

Champions

Singles
- (United States) Venus Williams

Doubles
- (United States) Lisa Raymond / (Australia) Rennae Stubbs
- IGA SuperThrift Tennis Classic

The 1999 IGA SuperThrift Tennis Classic was a women's tennis tournament played on indoor hard courts at The Greens Country Club in Oklahoma City, Oklahoma in the United States that was part of Tier III of the 1999 WTA Tour. It was the 14th edition of the tournament and was held from February 22 through February 28, 1999. First-seeded Venus Williams won her second consecutive singles title at the event and earned $27,000 first-prize money. On the same day her sister Serena won the Open Gaz de France tournament, making them the first sisters to win WTA events in the same week.

== Finals ==
=== Singles ===
(United States) Venus Williams defeated (South Africa) Amanda Coetzer, 6–4, 6–0

- It was Williams' 2nd singles title of the year and the 4th of her career.

=== Doubles ===
(United States) Lisa Raymond / (Australia) Rennae Stubbs defeated (South Africa) Amanda Coetzer / (South Africa) Jessica Steck, 6–3, 6–4

== Entrants ==
=== Seeds ===
Country	Player	Rank	Seed
USA	Venus Williams	5	1
RUS	Anna Kournikova	13	2
RSA	Amanda Coetzer	10	3
USA	Lisa Raymond	27	4
USA	Chanda Rubin	28	5
USA	Amy Frazier	32	6
RSA	Mariaan de Swardt	33	7
USA	Tara Snyder	36	8

=== Other entrants ===
The following players received wildcards into the singles main draw:

- (United States) Alexandra Stevenson
- (United States) Lori McNeil

The following players received wildcards into the doubles main draw:

- (South Africa) Amanda Coetzer / (South Africa) Jessica Steck

The following players received entry from the singles qualifying draw:

- (United States) Lilia Osterloh
- (United States) Mashona Washington
- (Japan) Nana Miyagi
- (Australia) Nicole Pratt

The following players received entry from the doubles qualifying draw:

- (Australia) Annabel Ellwood / (United States) Brie Rippner
