= 2001 Kroger St. Jude International – Singles =

Singles
- 2001 Kroger St. Jude International

Final
- Champion: (Australia) Mark Philippoussis
- Runner-up: (Italy) Davide Sanguinetti
- Score: 6–3, 6–7^{(5–7)}, 6–3

Details
- Draw: 48
- Seeds: 16

Events
Singles	Doubles
← 2000 ·	U.S. National Indoor Championships	· 2002 →

Magnus Larsson was the defending champion but did not compete that year.

Mark Philippoussis won in the final 6–3, 6–7^{(5–7)}, 6–3 against Davide Sanguinetti.

== Seeds ==
A champion seed is indicated in bold text while text in italics indicates the round in which that seed was eliminated. All sixteen seeds received a bye to the second round.

1. (United States) Pete Sampras (second round)
2. (Australia) **Mark Philippoussis (champion)**
3. (Germany) Tommy Haas (semifinals)
4. (Ecuador) Nicolás Lapentti (second round)
5. (United States) Jan-Michael Gambill (quarterfinals)
6. (United States) Michael Chang (third round)
7. (United Kingdom) Greg Rusedski (second round)
8. (Israel) Harel Levy (third round)
9. (Italy) Davide Sanguinetti (final)
10. (Australia) Wayne Arthurs (second round)
11. (Spain) Juan Balcells (third round)
12. (Australia) Jason Stoltenberg (quarterfinals)
13. (Switzerland) Michel Kratochvil (second round)
14. (United States) Paul Goldstein (third round)
15. (South Korea) Hyung-Taik Lee (second round)
16. (Sweden) Magnus Gustafsson (third round)

== Draw ==
=== Key ===
- Q = Qualifier
- WC = Wild card
- LL = Lucky loser
- Alt = Alternate
- SE = Special exempt
- PR = Protected ranking
- ITF = ITF entry
- JE = Junior exempt
- w/o = Walkover
- r = Retired
- d = Defaulted
- SR = Special ranking

=== Finals ===
Semifinals
9	(Italy) **Davide Sanguinetti**	**7^{7}**	**6**
(Canada) Sébastien Lareau	6^{1}	3
3	(Germany) Tommy Haas	6^{5}	6^{5}
2	(Australia) **Mark Philippoussis**	**7^{7}**	**7^{7}**

Final
9	(Italy) Davide Sanguinetti	3	**7^{7}**	3
2	(Australia) **Mark Philippoussis**	**6**	6^{5}	**6**

=== Top half ===
==== Section 1 ====
First round
(France) S Huet	1	6^{1}
(United States) **C Woodruff**	**6**	**7^{7}**
WC	(Croatia) **G Ivanišević**	**6**	**6**
(Armenia) S Sargsian	2	4
(Germany) **M Hantschk**	2	**7^{7}**	**7**
(Czech Republic) T Zíb	**6**	6^{5}	5
Q	(United States) **V Spadea**	4	**6**	**6**
(South Africa) N Godwin	**6**	3	2

Second round
WC/1	(United States) P Sampras	6^{4}	2
(United States) **C Woodruff**	**7^{7}**	**6**
WC	(Croatia) **G Ivanišević**	**6**	5	**6**
13	(Switzerland) M Kratochvil	4	**7**	4
9	(Italy) **D Sanguinetti**	**6**	**6**
(Germany) M Hantschk	4	4
Q	(United States) V Spadea	3	2
6	(United States) **M Chang**	**6**	**6**

Third round
(United States) **C Woodruff**	**6**	**7^{7}**
WC	(Croatia) G Ivanišević	3	6^{3}
9	(Italy) **D Sanguinetti**	**6**	**6**
6	(United States) M Chang	2	3

Quarterfinals
(United States) C Woodruff	2	**6**	3
9	(Italy) **D Sanguinetti**	**6**	3	**6**

==== Section 2 ====
First round
(Netherlands) E Kempes	4	6^{4}
(Canada) **S Lareau**	**6**	**7^{7}**
Q	(Australia) **S Draper**	**6**	**6**
(United States) C Mamiit	4	0
(Chile) **F González**	**6**	**7^{9}**
Q	(Sweden) F Jonsson	4	6^{7}
(Italy) A Gaudenzi	**7^{7}**	6^{4}	6^{5}
(Russia) **M Youzhny**	6^{5}	**7^{7}**	**7^{7}**

Second round
4	(Ecuador) N Lapentti	**6**	3	6^{2}
(Canada) **S Lareau**	4	**6**	**7^{7}**
Q	(Australia) **S Draper**	**7^{10}**	**6**
15	(South Korea) H-T Lee	6^{8}	2
12	(Australia) **J Stoltenberg**	4	**6**	**6**
(Chile) F González	**6**	2	3
(Russia) M Youzhny	3	6^{3}
8	(Israel) **H Levy**	**6**	**7^{7}**

Third round
(Canada) **S Lareau**	**6**	3	**6**
Q	(Australia) S Draper	2	**6**	4
12	(Australia) **J Stoltenberg**	**6**	6^{6}	**6**
8	(Israel) H Levy	4	**7^{8}**	3

Quarterfinals
(Canada) **S Lareau**	**7^{8}**	**6**
12	(Australia) J Stoltenberg	6^{6}	4

=== Bottom half ===
==== Section 3 ====
First round
(Germany) C Vinck	3	6^{4}
(Belgium) **X Malisse**	**6**	**7^{7}**
(Russia) **A Stoliarov**	**7**	**6**
(Spain) E Benfele Álvarez	5	4
(Romania) **A Voinea**	**7^{7}**	**6**
(France) C Saulnier	6^{5}	2
WC	(United States) **A Roddick**	**6**	**7**
(France) A Dupuis	4	5

Second round
5	(United States) **J-M Gambill**	**7^{7}**	**6**
(Belgium) X Malisse	6^{2}	3
(Russia) A Stoliarov	5	3
11	(Spain) **J Balcells**	**7**	**6**
14	(United States) **P Goldstein**	**6**	**6**
(Romania) A Voinea	0	2
WC	(United States) A Roddick	**7^{7}**	0	4
3	(Germany) **T Haas**	6^{5}	**6**	**6**

Third round
5	(United States) **J-M Gambill**	**6**	**7**
11	(Spain) J Balcells	0	5
14	(United States) P Goldstein	3	4
3	(Germany) **T Haas**	**6**	**6**

Quarterfinals
5	(United States) J-M Gambill	4	2
3	(Germany) **T Haas**	**6**	**6**

==== Section 4 ====
First round
Q	(United States) K Kim	2	4
Q	(Russia) **D Tursunov**	**6**	**6**
(Switzerland) **G Bastl**	1	**7^{7}**	**6**
(United States) J Gimelstob	**6**	6^{4}	2
(Thailand) P Srichaphan	**7^{7}**	3	4
WC	(United States) **M Fish**	6^{5}	**6**	**6**
Q	(Spain) **J A Viloca**	**6**	**6**
(Brazil) A Sá	1	4

Second round
7	(United Kingdom) G Rusedski	6^{4}	**6**	3
Q	(Russia) **D Tursunov**	**7^{7}**	3	**6**
(Switzerland) **G Bastl**	**7^{7}**	**7^{7}**
10	(Australia) W Arthurs	6^{4}	6^{2}
16	(Sweden) **M Gustafsson**	1	**7**	**6**
WC	(United States) M Fish	**6**	5	4
Q	(Spain) J A Viloca	2	5
2	(Australia) **M Philippoussis**	**6**	**7**

Third round
Q	(Russia) **D Tursunov**	**6**	**7^{7}**
(Switzerland) G Bastl	3	6^{4}
16	(Sweden) M Gustafsson	3	5
2	(Australia) **M Philippoussis**	**6**	**7**

Quarterfinals
Q	(Russia) D Tursunov	3	2
2	(Australia) **M Philippoussis**	**6**	**6**
