= 2002 Kroger St. Jude International – Men's doubles =

Men's doubles
- 2002 Kroger St. Jude International

Final
- Champions: (United States) Brian MacPhie (Federal Republic of Yugoslavia) Nenad Zimonjić
- Runners-up: (United States) Bob Bryan (United States) Mike Bryan
- Score: 6–3, 3–6, [10–4]

Details
- Draw: 16
- Seeds: 4

Events
Singles	men	women
Doubles	men	women
- U.S. National Indoor Championships

Bob Bryan and Mike Bryan were the defending champions but lost in the final 6–3, 3–6, [10–4] against Brian MacPhie and Nenad Zimonjić.

== Seeds ==
1. (India) Mahesh Bhupathi / (India) Leander Paes (quarterfinals)
2. (South Africa) Ellis Ferreira / (United States) Rick Leach (semifinals)
3. (United States) Bob Bryan / (United States) Mike Bryan (final)
4. (United States) Brian MacPhie / (Federal Republic of Yugoslavia) Nenad Zimonjić (champions)

== Draw ==
Key

- Q = Qualifier
- WC = Wild card
- LL = Lucky loser
- Alt = Alternate
- ITF = ITF entry
- PR = Protected ranking
- SR = Special ranking
- SE = Special exempt
- JE = Junior exempt
- JR = Junior Accelerator Programme entrant
- CO = College Accelerator Programme entrant
- NG = Next Gen Accelerator Program entrant
- w/o = Walkover
- r = Retired
- d = Defaulted

First round
1	(India) M Bhupathi (India) L Paes	7^{7}	2	[11]
(Sweden) J Björkman (United States) J Gimelstob	6^{5}	6	[9]
(Australia) T Crichton (France) M Llodra	3	6^{5}
(United States) J-M Gambill (United States) A Roddick	6	7^{7}
3	(United States) B Bryan (United States) M Bryan	6	6
WC	(United States) M Fish (United States) J Morrison	2	3
(Belgium) X Malisse (Armenia) S Sargsian	7^{9}	6
WC	(Germany) T Haas (United States) G Weiner	6^{7}	4
(Czech Republic) L Friedl (Czech Republic) P Luxa	2	3
(Japan) T Shimada (Brazil) A Sá	6	6
(South Africa) M Barnard (South Africa) R Koenig	6^{5}	6	[8]
4	(United States) B MacPhie (Federal Republic of Yugoslavia) N Zimonjić	7^{7}	4	[10]
WC	(United States) J Blake (United States) T Martin	6	6
(Australia) W Arthurs (Czech Republic) M Damm	4	3
(Australia) A Florent (Australia) D Macpherson	2	2
2	(South Africa) E Ferreira (United States) R Leach	6	6

Quarterfinals
1	(India) M Bhupathi (India) L Paes	6^{4}	4
(United States) J-M Gambill (United States) A Roddick	7^{7}	6
3	(United States) B Bryan (United States) M Bryan	6	6^{3}	[10]
(Belgium) X Malisse (Armenia) S Sargsian	3	7^{7}	[4]
(Japan) T Shimada (Brazil) A Sá	3	3
4	(United States) B MacPhie (Federal Republic of Yugoslavia) N Zimonjić	6	6
WC	(United States) J Blake (United States) T Martin	6	3	[9]
2	(South Africa) E Ferreira (United States) R Leach	3	6	[11]

Semifinals
(United States) J-M Gambill (United States) A Roddick	3	7^{7}	[4]
3	(United States) B Bryan (United States) M Bryan	6	6^{5}	[10]
4	(United States) B MacPhie (Federal Republic of Yugoslavia) N Zimonjić	6	6
2	(South Africa) E Ferreira (United States) R Leach	3	0

Final
3	(United States) B Bryan (United States) M Bryan	3	6	[4]
4	(United States) B MacPhie (Federal Republic of Yugoslavia) N Zimonjić	6	3	[10]
