= 2002 Kroger St. Jude International – Men's singles =

Men's singles
- 2002 Kroger St. Jude International

Final
- Champion: (United States) Andy Roddick
- Runner-up: (United States) James Blake
- Score: 6–4, 3–6, 7–5

Details
- Draw: 32
- Seeds: 8

Events
Singles	men	women
Doubles	men	women
← 2001 ·	U.S. National Indoor Championships	· 2003 →

Mark Philippoussis was the defending champion but lost in the first round to Jonas Björkman.

Andy Roddick won in the final 6–4, 3–6, 7–5 against James Blake.

== Seeds ==
A champion seed is indicated in bold text while text in italics indicates the round in which that seed was eliminated.

1. (Germany) Tommy Haas (quarterfinals)
2. (United States) **Andy Roddick (champion)**
3. (United States) Jan-Michael Gambill (semifinals)
4. (Belgium) Xavier Malisse (semifinals)
5. (Germany) Rainer Schüttler (quarterfinals)
6. (Sweden) Jonas Björkman (second round)
7. (Italy) Davide Sanguinetti (second round)
8. (United States) James Blake (final)

== Draw ==
=== Key ===
- Q = Qualifier
- WC = Wild card
- LL = Lucky loser
- Alt = Alternate
- SE = Special exempt
- PR = Protected ranking
- ITF = ITF entry
- JE = Junior exempt
- w/o = Walkover
- r = Retired
- d = Defaulted
- SR = Special ranking

First round
1	(Germany) **T Haas**	**6**	5	**6**
(Czech Republic) J Vacek	3	**7**	4
Q	(United States) **J Gimelstob**	**6**	**7^{7}**
WC	(United States) M Fish	3	6^{4}
WC	(United States) **T Dent**	**7^{7}**	**6**
WC	(United States) R Ginepri	6^{5}	4
(United States) M Chang	4	4
8	(United States) **J Blake**	**6**	**6**
3	(United States) **J-M Gambill**	**6**	**7**
(Russia) N Davydenko	1	5
Q	(United States) **P Goldstein**	6^{4}	**6**	**7^{7}**
(Australia) W Arthurs	**7^{7}**	3	6^{5}
(Thailand) P Srichaphan	**7^{7}**	4	4
Q	(United States) **J Morrison**	6^{5}	**6**	**6**
(France) M Llodra	**6**	3	6^{4}
5	(Germany) **R Schüttler**	3	**6**	**7^{7}**
7	(Italy) **D Sanguinetti**	**6**	**6**
(Paraguay) R Delgado	2	2
Q	(United States) J Salzenstein	6^{8}	6^{7}
(United States) **T Martin**	**7^{10}**	**7^{9}**
(Czech Republic) **M Damm**	**6**	**7^{7}**
(Denmark) K Pless	4	6^{5}
(Spain) J Balcells	6^{2}	4
4	(Belgium) **X Malisse**	**7^{7}**	**6**
6	(Sweden) **J Björkman**	**7^{8}**	**7^{7}**
(Australia) M Philippoussis	6^{6}	6^{1}
(Belgium) C Rochus	2	3
(Armenia) **S Sargsian**	**6**	**6**
(Brazil) **A Sá**	**6**	**6**
(Australia) A Ilie	2	0
(Germany) L Burgsmüller	2	3
2	(United States) **A Roddick**	**6**	**6**

Second round
1	(Germany) **T Haas**	**7^{9}**	**6**
Q	(United States) J Gimelstob	6^{7}	2
WC	(United States) T Dent	**6**	4	3
8	(United States) **J Blake**	2	**6**	**6**
3	(United States) **J-M Gambill**	4	**6**	**6**
Q	(United States) P Goldstein	**6**	2	0
Q	(United States) J Morrison	4	5
5	(Germany) **R Schüttler**	**6**	**7**
7	(Italy) D Sanguinetti	5	6^{2}
(United States) **T Martin**	**7**	**7^{7}**
(Czech Republic) M Damm	2	4
4	(Belgium) **X Malisse**	**6**	**6**
6	(Sweden) J Björkman	**6**	3	6^{8}
(Armenia) **S Sargsian**	1	**6**	**7^{10}**
(Brazil) A Sá	**7**	4	3
2	(United States) **A Roddick**	5	**6**	**6**

Quarterfinals
1	(Germany) T Haas	3	1
8	(United States) **J Blake**	**6**	**6**
3	(United States) **J-M Gambill**	**6**	4	**7^{7}**
5	(Germany) R Schüttler	3	**6**	6^{2}
(United States) T Martin	6^{5}	**6**	5
4	(Belgium) **X Malisse**	**7^{7}**	3	**7**
(Armenia) S Sargsian	3	4
2	(United States) **A Roddick**	**6**	**6**

Semifinals
8	(United States) **J Blake**	**6**	**7^{10}**
3	(United States) J-M Gambill	4	6^{8}
4	(Belgium) X Malisse	**7^{7}**	3	3
2	(United States) **A Roddick**	6^{5}	**6**	**6**

Final
8	(United States) James Blake	4	**6**	5
2	(United States) **Andy Roddick**	**6**	3	**7**
