= Nicole Pitts =

American tennis player

- Country (sports): United States
- Born: November 3, 1986 (age 39)
- Height: 5 ft 10 in (178 cm)

Singles
- Highest ranking: No. 584 (August 5, 2002)

Doubles
- Highest ranking: No. 494 (March 7, 2005)

Nicole Pitts (born November 3, 1986) is an American former child actress and former professional tennis player.

As a child, she appeared in Mickey's Fun Songs: Let's Go to the Circus.

Pitts, a Junior Orange Bowl (14s) champion in 2000, turned professional as a teenager. She made a WTA Tour main draw appearance at the 2002 Kroger St. Jude International in Memphis, where she was beaten in the first round by the ninth-seeded Irina Selyutina. With a wrist injury ending her career early, Pitts attended medical school in Tennessee and now works as a pediatric sports medicine physician.

== Personal life ==
Pitts is a half sister of tennis players Hurricane Tyra Black and Tornado Alicia Black, from her mother Gayal's marriage to their father Sylvester "Sly" Black, a former hitting coach of Nicole.
