= Melissa Middleton =

American tennis player

- Country (sports): United States
- Born: June 6, 1982 (age 42); Houston, Texas
- Height: 5 ft 7 in (170 cm)
- Plays: Right-handed
- Prize money: $69,588

Singles
- Career record: 94–84
- Highest ranking: No. 225 (September 13, 1999)

Grand Slam singles results
- US Open: 1R (1999)

Doubles
- Career record: 30–37
- Career titles: 2 ITF / 0 WTA
- Highest ranking: No. 116 (February 25, 2002)

Melissa Middleton (born June 6, 1982) is an American former professional tennis player.

Middleton, a right-handed player, was born and raised in Houston, Texas. A successful player in junior tennis, she won both the Easter Bowl and USTA National Clay Court Championships as an under 16 in 1996.

On the professional tour, Middleton reached a career best singles ranking of 225. In 1999 she featured as a wildcard in the US Open main draw and reached the second round of the Lipton Championships, with a first round win over Lori McNeil. As a doubles player she made it to 116 in the world and was a WTA Tour finalist in Memphis in 2002.

== WTA Tour finals ==
=== Doubles: 1 (runner-up) ===
Result	Date	Tournament	Tier	Surface	Partner	Opponents	Score
Loss	Feb 2002	Memphis, United States	Tier III	Hard	(United States) Brie Rippner	(Japan) Ai Sugiyama (Ukraine) Elena Tatarkova	4–6, 6–2, 0–6

== ITF finals ==
Legend
$75,000 tournaments
$50,000 tournaments
$40,000 tournaments
$25,000 tournaments
$10,000 tournaments

=== Doubles (2–3) ===
Outcome	No.	Date	Tournament	Surface	Partner	Opponents	Score
Runner-up	1.	January 15, 2001	Boca Raton, US	Hard	(United States) Jacqueline Trail	(Russia) Evgenia Kulikovskaya (United States) Jolene Watanabe	1–6, 0–6
Runner-up	2.	March 5, 2001	Saltillo, Mexico	Hard	(United States) Courtenay Chapman	(Spain) Conchita Martínez Granados (Argentina) Melisa Arévalo	6–7^{(3)}, 6–0, 1–6
Winner	1.	April 29, 2001	Sarasota, US	Clay	(India) Nirupama Sanjeev	(Chinese Taipei) Janet Lee (United States) Samantha Reeves	6–4, 6–2
Winner	2.	January 27, 2002	Fullerton, US	Hard	(United States) Brie Rippner	(Netherlands) Amanda Hopmans (Italy) Giulia Casoni	2–6, 6–4, 7–5
Runner-up	3.	February 3, 2002	Rockford, US	Hard (i)	(United States) Brie Rippner	(Netherlands) Amanda Hopmans (Italy) Giulia Casoni	4–6, ret.
