= 2001 Kroger St. Jude International =

- Date: February 19–25
- Edition: 31st
- Category: International Series Gold
- Prize money: $700,000
- Surface: Hard / indoor
- Location: Memphis, Tennessee, U.S.
- Venue: Racquet Club of Memphis

Champions

Singles
- (Australia) Mark Philippoussis

Doubles
- (United States) Bob Bryan / (United States) Mike Bryan
- U.S. National Indoor Championships

The 2001 Kroger St. Jude International was a men's tennis tournament played on indoor hard courts at the Racquet Club of Memphis in Memphis, Tennessee in the United States that was part of the International Series Gold of the 2001 ATP Tour. It was the 31st edition of the tournament and was held from February 19 through February 25, 2001. Second-seeded Mark Philippoussis won the singles title.

== Finals ==
=== Singles ===
(Australia) Mark Philippoussis defeated (Italy) Davide Sanguinetti 6–3, 6–7^{(5–7)}, 6–3

- It was Philippoussis' only title of the year and the 12th of his career.

=== Doubles ===
(United States) Bob Bryan / (United States) Mike Bryan defeated (United States) Alex O'Brien / (United States) Jonathan Stark 6–3, 7–6^{(7–3)}

- It was Bob Bryan's 1st title of the year and the 1st of his career. It was Mike Bryan's 1st title of the year and the 1st of his career.
