= 2000 IGA SuperThrift Tennis Classic – Doubles =

Doubles
- 2000 IGA SuperThrift Tennis Classic

Final
- Champions: (United States) Corina Morariu (United States) Kimberly Po
- Runners-up: (Thailand) Tamarine Tanasugarn (Ukraine) Elena Tatarkova
- Score: 6–4, 4–6, 6–2

Details
- Draw: 16
- Seeds: 4

Events
Singles	Doubles
- U.S. National Indoor Tennis Championships

Lisa Raymond and Rennae Stubbs were the reigning champions, but neither competed this year. Raymond entered the tournament, but decided to focus on the singles competition.

Corina Morariu and Kimberly Po won the title by defeating Tamarine Tanasugarn and Elena Tatarkova 6–4, 4–6, 6–2 in the final.

== Seeds ==
1. (United States) Corina Morariu / (United States) Kimberly Po (champions)
2. (Zimbabwe) Cara Black / (Kazakhstan) Irina Selyutina (semifinals)
3. (Italy) Rita Grande / (France) Émilie Loit (quarterfinals)
4. (United States) Debbie Graham / (Japan) Nana Miyagi (first round)

== Draw ==
Key

- Q = Qualifier
- WC = Wild card
- LL = Lucky loser
- Alt = Alternate
- ITF = ITF entry
- PR = Protected ranking
- SR = Special ranking
- SE = Special exempt
- JE = Junior exempt
- JR = Junior Accelerator Programme entrant
- CO = College Accelerator Programme entrant
- NG = Next Gen Accelerator Program entrant
- w/o = Walkover
- r = Retired
- d = Defaulted

=== Draw ===
First round
1	(United States) C Morariu (United States) K Po	6	6
(France) N Dechy (Russia) E Kulikovskaya	0	0
(United States) E deLone (Australia) N Pratt	6	7
WC	(United States) J Hopkins (United States) K Miller	3	5
3	(Italy) R Grande (France) É Loit	6	6
(South Africa) N de Villiers (South Africa) K Grant	3	1
(Japan) R Hiraki (Japan) Y Yoshida	7	7
Q	(Japan) S Asagoe (Russia) A Jidkova	5	2
LL	(Bulgaria) L Bacheva (France) S Pitkowski	1	2
(Thailand) T Tanasugarn (Ukraine) E Tatarkova	6	6
(South Africa) A Coetzer (United States) L McNeil	6	6
4	(United States) D Graham (Japan) N Miyagi	4	1
(United States) L Osterloh (South Africa) J Steck	5	6^{2}
(United States) T Snyder (Canada) V Webb	7	7^{7}
(Canada) R Kolbovic (United States) S Reeves	0	1
2	(Zimbabwe) C Black (Kazakhstan) I Selyutina	6	6

Quarterfinals
1	(United States) C Morariu (United States) K Po	3	6	6
(United States) E deLone (Australia) N Pratt	6	1	3
3	(Italy) R Grande (France) É Loit	4	2
(Japan) R Hiraki (Japan) Y Yoshida	6	6
(Thailand) T Tanasugarn (Ukraine) E Tatarkova	7^{7}	5	6
(South Africa) A Coetzer (United States) L McNeil	6^{5}	7	3
(United States) T Snyder (Canada) V Webb	2	3
2	(Zimbabwe) C Black (Kazakhstan) I Selyutina	6	6

Semifinals
1	(United States) C Morariu (United States) K Po	7	6
(Japan) R Hiraki (Japan) Y Yoshida	5	3
(Thailand) T Tanasugarn (Ukraine) E Tatarkova	6	6
2	(Zimbabwe) C Black (Kazakhstan) I Selyutina	3	4

Final
1	(United States) C Morariu (United States) K Po	6	4	6
(Thailand) T Tanasugarn (Ukraine) E Tatarkova	4	6	2
