= 2000 IGA SuperThrift Tennis Classic – Singles =

Singles
- 2000 IGA SuperThrift Tennis Classic

Final
- Champion: (United States) Monica Seles
- Runner-up: (France) Nathalie Dechy
- Score: 6–1, 7–6^{(7–3)}

Details
- Draw: 30
- Seeds: 8

Events
Singles	Doubles
- U.S. National Indoor Tennis Championships

Venus Williams was the reigning champion, but did not compete this year due to a tendinitis in her left wrist.

Monica Seles won the title by defeating Nathalie Dechy 6–1, 7–6^{(7–3)} in the final.

== Seeds ==
The top two seeds received a bye to the second round.

1. (France) ~~Julie Halard-Decugis~~ (withdrew)
2. (United States) Monica Seles (champion)
3. (South Africa) Amanda Coetzer (semifinals)
4. (United States) Amy Frazier (quarterfinals)
5. (France) Nathalie Dechy (final)
6. (United States) Lisa Raymond (quarterfinals)
7. (Austria) Sylvia Plischke (second round)
8. (France) Sarah Pitkowski (quarterfinals)

== Draw ==
Key

- Q = Qualifier
- WC = Wild card
- LL = Lucky loser
- Alt = Alternate
- ITF = ITF entry
- PR = Protected ranking
- SR = Special ranking
- SE = Special exempt
- JE = Junior exempt
- JR = Junior Accelerator Programme entrant
- CO = College Accelerator Programme entrant
- NG = Next Gen Accelerator Program entrant
- w/o = Walkover
- r = Retired
- d = Defaulted

=== Finals ===
Semifinals
(Italy) Rita Grande	4	2
5	(France) Nathalie Dechy	6	6
3	(South Africa) Amanda Coetzer	1	2
2	(United States) Monica Seles	6	6

Final
5	(France) Nathalie Dechy	1	6^{3}
2	(United States) Monica Seles	6	7^{7}

=== Top half ===
First round
(Italy) R Grande	6	7^{7}
WC	(United States) K Po	3	6^{5}
(United States) E deLone	1	4
(Russia) T Panova	6	6
(United States) A Stevenson	1	4
7	(Austria) S Plischke	6	6
4	(United States) A Frazier	4	6	6
(United States) L Osterloh	6	2	3
(Chinese Taipei) J Lee	6	3	6^{2}
Q	(United States) M Washington	4	6	7^{7}
LL	(Canada) V Webb	2	3
(Australia) N Pratt	6	6
WC	(Australia) A Molik	5	0
5	(France) N Dechy	7	6

Second round
LL	(United States) M Tu	4	6	2
(Italy) R Grande	6	3	6
(Russia) T Panova	3	6	6
7	(Austria) S Plischke	6	2	3
4	(United States) A Frazier	6	6
Q	(United States) M Washington	1	4
(Australia) N Pratt	4	3
5	(France) N Dechy	6	6

Quarterfinals
(Italy) R Grande	4	6	6
(Russia) T Panova	6	3	4
4	(United States) A Frazier	4	5
5	(France) N Dechy	6	7

Semifinals
(Italy) R Grande	4	2
5	(France) N Dechy	6	6

=== Bottom half ===
First round
6	(United States) L Raymond	6	6^{5}	7^{7}
(Zimbabwe) C Black	3	7^{7}	6^{4}
(United States) K Brandi	4	6	0
(United States) C Morariu	6	4	6
(Thailand) T Tanasugarn	6	6
(United States) T Snyder	3	1
(Russia) A Myskina	5	2
3	(South Africa) A Coetzer	7	6
8	(France) S Pitkowski	6	6^{7}	6
(Bulgaria) L Bacheva	3	7^{9}	1
Q	(Japan) S Asagoe	4	3
Q	(Slovakia) D Hantuchová	6	6
(Italy) F Lubiani	6	6
(Canada) J Nejedly	3	2

Second round
6	(United States) L Raymond	2	6	6
(United States) C Morariu	6	0	3
(Thailand) T Tanasugarn	6^{2}	6^{4}
3	(South Africa) A Coetzer	7^{7}	7^{7}
8	(France) S Pitkowski	6	6
Q	(Slovakia) D Hantuchová	2	3
(Italy) F Lubiani	3	3
2	(United States) M Seles	6	6

Quarterfinals
6	(United States) L Raymond	6	4	6^{4}
3	(South Africa) A Coetzer	2	6	7^{7}
8	(France) S Pitkowski	0	0
2	(United States) M Seles	6	6

Semifinals
3	(South Africa) A Coetzer	1	2
2	(United States) M Seles	6	6
