= Nathalie Dechy =

French tennis player (born 1979)

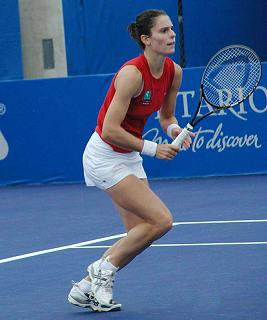
- Country (sports): France
- Residence: Tournai, Belgium
- Born: 21 February 1979 (age 47) Les Abymes, Guadeloupe
- Height: 1.78 m (5 ft 10 in)
- Turned pro: 1995
- Retired: 21 July 2009
- Plays: Right (two-handed backhand)
- Prize money: $4,281,064

Singles
- Career record: 430–340
- Career titles: 1 WTA, 1 ITF
- Highest ranking: No. 11 (9 January 2006)

Grand Slam singles results
- Australian Open: SF (2005)
- French Open: 3R (1998, 1999, 2001, 2002, 2003, 2005, 2006)
- Wimbledon: 4R (1999, 2005)
- US Open: 4R (1998, 2005)

Doubles
- Career record: 191–181
- Career titles: 7 WTA, 1 ITF
- Highest ranking: No. 8 (21 May 2007)

Grand Slam doubles results
- Australian Open: SF (2009)
- French Open: QF (2000, 2003, 2006)
- Wimbledon: SF (2008)
- US Open: W (2006, 2007)

Grand Slam mixed doubles results
- French Open: W (2007)

Team competitions
- Fed Cup: W (2003)

Nathalie Dechy (born 21 February 1979) is a former professional tennis player from France.

== Personal life ==
Dechy was born to a father from continental France and a Canadian mother from the Eastern Townships of Quebec. She holds dual French-Canadian citizenship. On 25 January 2010 she gave birth to a son.

== Career ==
Dechy is a three-time doubles Grand Slam champion, winning the 2006 US Open women's doubles title with Vera Zvonareva, the 2007 French Open mixed doubles title with Andy Ram, and the 2007 US Open women's doubles title with Dinara Safina. Her biggest singles achievement is reaching the semifinals of the 2005 Australian Open.

At the 2008 Wimbledon Championships, she faced world No. 1 and reigning French Open champion, Ana Ivanovic. She had a match point during the second set, before losing in the super-tiebreak, 7–6, 6–7, 8–10.

Since 2015, Nathalie Dechy has been the director of the Biarritz Tennis Tournament, a women's tennis event organized every year by the Quarterback agency at Biarritz Olympic Tennis. It is part of the ITF Circuit and has $80,000 in prize money.

== Grand Slam singles performance timeline ==
Key
W	F	SF	QF	#R	RR	Q#	DNQ	A	NH

(W) winner; (F) finalist; (SF) semifinalist; (QF) quarterfinalist; (#R) rounds 4, 3, 2, 1; (RR) round-robin stage; (Q#) qualification round; (DNQ) did not qualify; (A) absent; (NH) not held; (SR) strike rate (events won / competed); (W–L) win–loss record.

Tournament	1994	1995	1996	1997	1998	1999	2000	2001	2002	2003	2004	2005	2006	2007	2008	2009
Australian Open	A	A	A	1R	1R	1R	1R	1R	3R	3R	4R	SF	1R	1R	1R	2R
French Open	A	1R	2R	1R	3R	3R	1R	3R	3R	3R	1R	3R	3R	2R	2R	1R
Wimbledon	A	A	1R	2R	1R	4R	3R	2R	3R	3R	3R	4R	1R	1R	2R	1R
US Open	A	A	2R	2R	4R	1R	2R	2R	3R	2R	3R	4R	1R	1R	1R	A
Year-end ranking	586	294	84	90	48	25	27	44	20	29	21	12	51	69	72	n/a

== Grand Slam tournament finals ==
=== Doubles: 2 (2 titles) ===
Result	Year	Championship	Surface	Partner	Opponents	Score
Win	2006	US Open	Hard	(Russia) Vera Zvonareva	(Slovenia) Katarina Srebotnik (Russia) Dinara Safina	7–6^{(7–5)}, 7–5
Win	2007	US Open	Hard	(Russia) Dinara Safina	(Chinese Taipei) Chan Yung-jan (Chinese Taipei) Chuang Chia-jung	6–4, 6–2

=== Mixed doubles: 2 (1 title, 1 runner-up) ===
Result	Year	Championship	Surface	Partner	Opponents	Score
Win	2007	French Open	Clay	(Israel) Andy Ram	(Slovenia) Katarina Srebotnik (Serbia) Nenad Zimonjić	7–5, 6–3
Loss	2009	Australian Open	Hard	(Israel) Andy Ram	(India) Sania Mirza (India) Mahesh Bhupathi	3–6, 1–6

== WTA Tour finals ==
=== Singles: 5 (1 title, 4 runner-ups) ===
Result	W/L	Date	Tournament	Surface	Opponent	Score
Loss	0–1	Feb 2000	National Indoors, United States	Hard (i)	(United States) Monica Seles	1–6, 6–7^{(3–7)}
Loss	0–2	Apr 2000	Estoril Open, Portugal	Clay	(Germany) Anke Huber	2–6, 6–1, 5–7
Win	1–2	Jan 2003	Australian Hardcourts	Hard	(Switzerland) Marie-Gaïané Mikaelian	6–3, 3–6, 6–3
Loss	1–3	Aug 2004	New Haven Open, United States	Hard	(Russia) Elena Bovina	2–6, 6–2, 5–7
Loss	1–4	Aug 2008	Cincinnati Masters, United States	Hard	(Russia) Nadia Petrova	2–6, 1–6

=== Doubles: 14 (7 titles, 7 runner-ups) ===
Result	W/L	Date	Tournament	Surface	Partner	Opponents	Score
Loss	0–1	Oct 2001	Bratislava Open, Slovakia	Hard (i)	(United States) Meilen Tu	(Russia) Elena Bovina (Czech Republic) Dája Bedáňová	3–6, 4–6
Win	1–1	Feb 2002	Paris Indoors, France	Carpet (i)	(United States) Meilen Tu	(Russia) Elena Dementieva (Slovakia) Janette Husárová	w/o
Loss	1–2	Feb 2002	Antwerp Open, Belgium	Hard (i)	(United States) Meilen Tu	(Bulgaria) Magdalena Maleeva (Switzerland) Patty Schnyder	3–6, 7–6^{(3)}, 3–6
Loss	1–3	Oct 2002	Bratislava Open, Slovakia	Hard (i)	(United States) Meilen Tu	(Slovenia) Maja Matevžič (Slovakia) Henrieta Nagyová	4–6, 0–6
Loss	1–4	Dec 2002	Australian Hardcourts	Hard	(France) Émilie Loit	(Russia) Svetlana Kuznetsova (United States) Martina Navratilova	4–6, 4–6
Loss	1–5	Feb 2003	Antwerp Open, Belgium	Carpet (i)	(France) Émilie Loit	(Belgium) Kim Clijsters (Japan) Ai Sugiyama	2–6, 0–6
Loss	1–6	Oct 2004	Linz Open, Austria	Hard (i)	(Switzerland) Patty Schnyder	(Slovakia) Janette Husárová (Russia) Elena Likhovtseva	2–6, 5–7
Win	2–6	Sep 2006	US Open, United States	Hard	(Russia) Vera Zvonareva	(Russia) Dinara Safina (Slovenia) Katarina Srebotnik	7–6^{(5)}, 7–5
Win	3–6	May 2007	Rome Masters, Italy	Clay	(Italy) Mara Santangelo	(Italy) Tathiana Garbin (Italy) Roberta Vinci	6–4, 6–1
Win	4–6	Sep 2007	US Open	Hard	(Russia) Dinara Safina	(Chinese Taipei) Chan Yung-jan (Chinese Taipei) Chuang Chia-jung	6–4, 6–2
Win	5–6	Jan 2009	Auckland Open, New Zealand	Hard	(Italy) Mara Santangelo	(Spain) Nuria Llagostera Vives (Spain) Arantxa Parra Santonja	4–6, 7–6^{(3)}, [12–10]
Loss	5–7	Jan 2009	Sydney International, Australia	Hard	(Australia) Casey Dellacqua	(Chinese Taipei) Hsieh Su-wei (China) Peng Shuai	0–6, 1–6
Win	6–7	Mar 2009	Monterrey Open, Mexico	Hard	(Italy) Mara Santangelo	(Czech Republic) Iveta Benešová (Czech Republic) Barbora Záhlavová-Strýcová	6–3, 6–4
Win	7–7	May 2009	Strasbourg Open, France	Clay	(Italy) Mara Santangelo	(France) Claire Feuerstein (France) Stéphanie Foretz	6–0, 6–1

== ITF Circuit finals ==
=== Singles (1–2) ===
$50,000 tournaments
$25,000 tournaments
$10,000 tournaments

Result	No.	Date	Tournament	Surface	Opponent	Score
Loss	1.	9 May 1994	ITF Mollet, Spain	Clay	(Spain) Mariam Ramón Climent	0–6, 0–6
Win	2.	14 December 1997	ITF Bad Gögging, Germany	Carpet (i)	(Belgium) Els Callens	6–4, 6–1
Loss	3.	6 December 1998	ITF Cergy-Pontoise, France	Hard (i)	(France) Sarah Pitkowski-Malcor	5–7, 6–3, 6–7^{(4)}

=== Doubles (1–1) ===
Result	No.	Date	Tournament	Surface	Partner	Opponents	Score
Win	1.	20 March 1995	ITF Moulins, France	Hard (i)	(France) Catherine Tanvier	(Mexico) Jessica Fernández (Australia) Aarthi Venkatesan	6–1, 6–3
Loss	2.	29 March 1997	ITF Woodlands, United States	Hard	(France) Lea Ghirardi	(Belgium) Els Callens (South Africa) Liezel Horn	4–6, 2–6
