= Brie Rippner =

American tennis player (born 1980)

- Full name: Aubrie Rippner
- Country (sports): United States
- Born: January 21, 1980 (age 45); Los Angeles, California, United States
- Height: 1.75 m (5 ft 9 in)
- Turned pro: 1995
- Retired: 2003
- Prize money: $382,708

Singles
- Career record: 154–119
- Career titles: 4 ITF
- Highest ranking: No. 57 (August 16, 1999)

Grand Slam singles results
- Australian Open: 2R (1999)
- French Open: 1R (1999)
- Wimbledon: 3R (2000)
- US Open: 2R (1997, 1998)

Doubles
- Career record: 62–53
- Career titles: 7 ITF
- Highest ranking: No. 92 (December 9, 2002)

Grand Slam doubles results
- Australian Open: 1R (2003)
- French Open: —
- Wimbledon: 1R (1998)
- US Open: 1R (1999, 2002)

Aubrie "Brie" Rippner (born January 21, 1980) is an American retired tennis player.

Rippner won four singles and seven doubles titles on the ITF circuit in her career. On August 16, 1999, she reached her best singles ranking of world number 57. On December 9, 2002, she peaked at world number 92 in the doubles rankings.

== WTA Tour finals ==
=== Doubles (0-1) ===
Result	Date	Tournament	Tier	Surface	Partner	Opponents	Score
Loss	Feb 2002	Memphis, U.S.	Tier III	Hard	(United States) Melissa Middleton	(Japan) Ai Sugiyama (Ukraine) Elena Tatarkova	4–6, 6–2, 0–6

== Junior Grand Slam finals ==
=== Girls' singles ===
Outcome	Year	Championship	Surface	Opponent	Score
Runner-up	1997	Wimbledon	Grass	(Zimbabwe) Cara Black	3–6, 5–7
