= Jelena Dokic career statistics =

Career finals
Discipline	Type	Won	Lost	Total
Singles	Grand Slam	–	–	–
Singles	Summer Olympics	–	–	–
Singles	WTA Finals (Note: Formerly known as: Virginia Slims Championships (until 1995); WTA Tour Championships (until 2014))	–	–	–
Singles	WTA 1000 (Note: Formerly known as: Category 4 & 5 & 6 (until 1990); Tier I (until 2009); WTA Premier Mandatory and 5 (until 2021))	2	2	4
Singles	WTA 500 (Note: Formerly known as: Category 3 (until 1990); Tier II (until 2009); WTA Premier (until 2021))	1	4	5
Singles	WTA 250 (Note: Formerly known as: Category 1 & 2 (until 1990); Tier III & IV & V (until 2009); WTA International (until 2021))	3	2	5
Singles	Total	6	8	14
Doubles	Grand Slam	0	1	1
Doubles	Summer Olympics	–	–	–
Doubles	WTA Finals	–	–	–
Doubles	WTA 1000	0	3	3
Doubles	WTA 500	3	2	5
Doubles	WTA 250	1	0	1
Doubles	Total	4	6	10
Total		10	14	24

This is a list of the main career statistics of Australian professional tennis player Jelena Dokic.

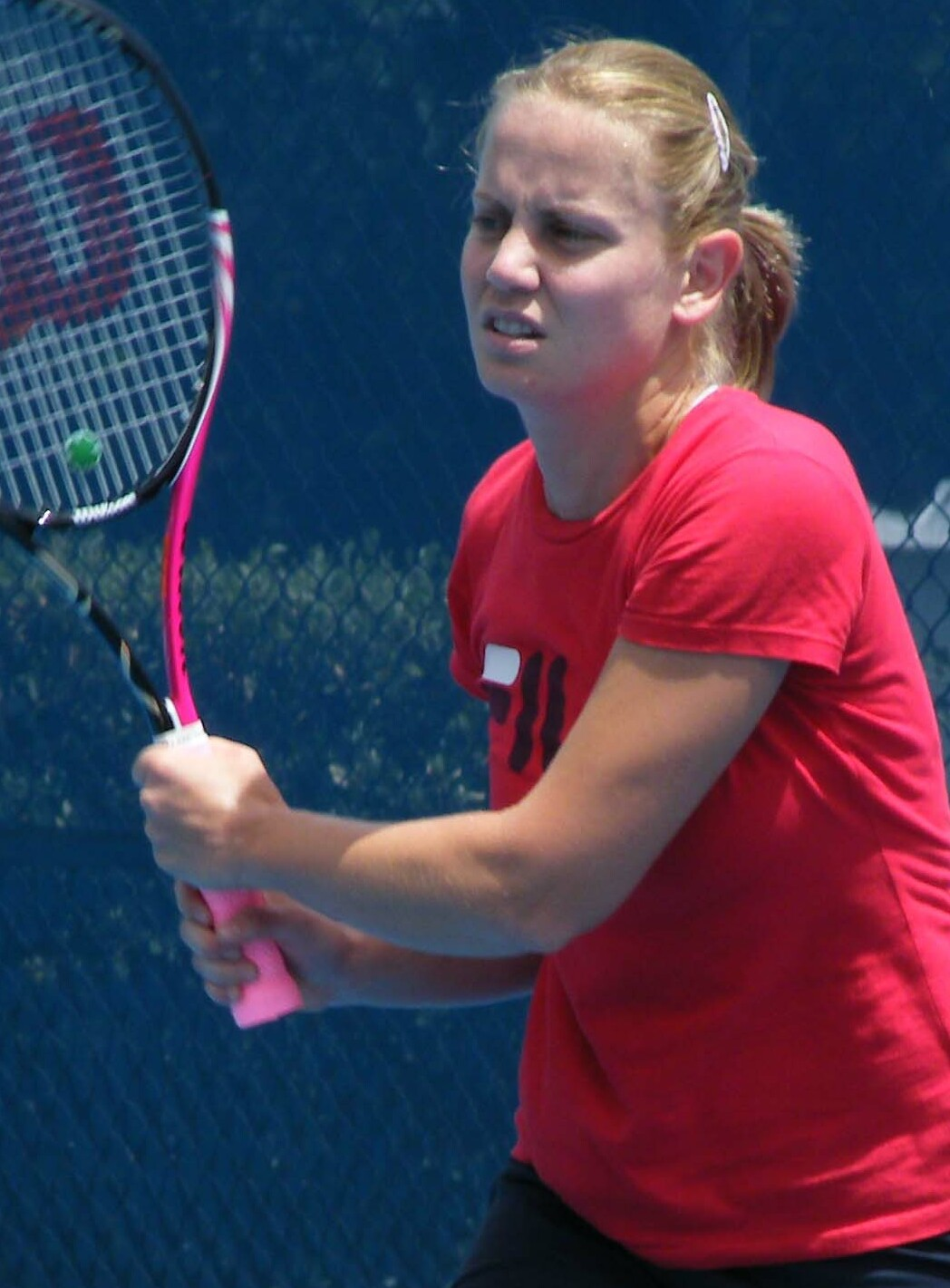
Dokic in 2011

== Performance timelines ==
Key
W	F	SF	QF	#R	RR	Q#	P#	DNQ	A	Z#	PO	G	S	B	NMS	NTI	P	NH

(W) winner; (F) finalist; (SF) semifinalist; (QF) quarterfinalist; (#R) rounds 4, 3, 2, 1; (RR) round-robin stage; (Q#) qualification round; (P#) preliminary round; (DNQ) did not qualify; (A) absent; (Z#) Davis/Fed Cup Zonal Group (with number indication) or (PO) play-off; (G) gold, (S) silver or (B) bronze Olympic/Paralympic medal; (NMS) not a Masters tournament; (NTI) not a Tier I tournament; (P) postponed; (NH) not held; (SR) strike rate (events won / competed); (W–L) win–loss record.

=== Singles ===
	Australia				FR Yugoslavia					Australia								
Tournament	1997	1998	1999	2000	2001	2002	2003	2004	2005	2006	2007	2008	2009	2010	2011	2012	SR	W–L
Grand Slam tournaments
Australian Open	A	A	3R	1R	1R	A	A	A	A	1R	A	Q2	QF	1R	2R	2R	0 / 8	8–8
French Open	A	A	1R	2R	3R	QF	2R	1R	A	A	A	A	2R	1R	1R	A	0 / 9	9–9
Wimbledon	A	A	QF	SF	4R	4R	3R	1R	A	Q1	A	A	1R	Q2	1R	A	0 / 8	17–8
US Open	A	A	1R	4R	4R	2R	2R	1R	A	A	A	A	1R	Q1	2R	A	0 / 8	9–8
Win–loss	0–0	0–0	6–4	9–4	8–4	8–3	4–3	0–3	0–0	0–1	0–0	0–0	5–4	0–2	2–4	1–1	0 / 33	43–33
National representation
Summer Olympics	Not Held			4th	Not Held			A	Not Held			A	Not Held			A	0 / 1	4–2
Year-end championships
WTA Finals	A	A	A	A	QF	QF	A	A	A	A	A	A	A	A	A	A	0 / 2	2–2
WTA 1000 + former^{†} tournaments
Dubai / Qatar Open (Note: The first Premier 5 event of the year has switched back and forth between the Dubai Tennis Championships and the Qatar Ladies Open since 2009. Dubai was classified as a Premier 5 event from 2009 to 2011 before being succeeded by Doha for the 2012–2014 period. In 2015, Dubai regained its Premier 5 status while Doha was demoted to Premier status. The Premier 5 tournaments were reclassified as WTA 1000 tournaments in 2021.)	Not Held				Premier							A	A	A	1R	NP5	0 / 1	0–1
Indian Wells Open	A	A	A	3R	A	3R	2R	2R	Q2	A	A	A	1R	1R	A	1R	0 / 8	3–8
Miami Open	A	A	A	2R	QF	3R	QF	4R	A	A	A	A	2R	A	1R	1R	0 / 8	10–8
Berlin / Madrid Open (Note: In 2009, the German Open was replaced by the Madrid Open. The Premier Mandatory tournaments were reclassified as WTA 1000 tournaments in 2021.)	A	A	A	A	2R	3R	3R	1R	A	A	A	A	A	A	A	A	0 / 4	3–4
Italian Open	A	A	A	QF	W	3R	1R	1R	A	A	A	A	A	A	A	A	1 / 5	10–4
Canadian Open	A	A	2R	1R	3R	SF	3R	A	A	A	A	A	A	A	1R	A	0 / 6	7–6
Cincinnati Open	Not Held							Tier III					A	A	A	A	0 / 0	0–0
Pan Pacific Open	A	A	A	A	A	2R	QF	SF	A	A	A	A	A	A	A	A	0 / 3	4–3
China Open	Not Held							Tier II					A	A	A	A	0 / 0	0–0
Charleston Open	A	A	A	QF	1R	2R	QF	2R	A	A	A	A	Premier				0 / 5	6–5
Kremlin Cup	A	A	A	1R	W	2R	1R	A	A	A	A	A	Premier				1 / 4	5–3
Zurich Open	A	A	A	2R	F	2R	F	A	A	A	A	T2	Not Held				0 / 4	9–4
Career statistics
Tournament	1997	1998	1999	2000	2001	2002	2003	2004	2005	2006	2007	2008	2009	2010	2011	2012	SR	W–L
Tournaments	3	2	16	21	26	29	30	16	10	8	1	13	15	18	19		221	
Titles	0	0	0	0	3	2	0	0	0	0	0	0	0	0	1		6	
Finals	0	0	0	0	6	5	1	0	0	0	0	0	0	0	2		14	
Hard win–loss	8–3	3–1	4–6	15–13	26–11	19–10	15–14	2–6	2–3	0–2	0–0	5–2	15–6	10–9	16–13			140–99
Clay win–loss	0–0	0–0	7–6	9–4	16–8	20–7	8–9	1–5	10–7	7–4	0–1	29–7	0–0	15–5	1–3			123–66
Grass win–loss	0–0	7–1	9–2	6–2	6–3	8–2	2–2	0–3	0–0	0–1	0–0	0–0	1–0	1–1	4–2			43–19
Carpet win–loss	0–0	0–0	1–2	5–2	5–1	6–7	3–5	3–2	0–0	3–1	0–0	1–1	0–0	0–0	0–0			27–21
Overall win–loss	8–3	10–2	21–16	35–21	53–23	53–26	28–30	6–16	12–10	10–8	0–1	35–10	27–13	26–15	21–18			345–212
Year-end ranking	None	341	43	26	8	9	15	125	349	617	None	179	56	137	66	259		

=== Doubles ===
	Australia		Yugoslavia		Australia						
Tournament	1999	2000	2001	2003	2009	2010	2011	2012	2014	SR	W–L
Australian Open	3R	3R	2R	A	A	1R	1R	1R	1R	0 / 7	5–7
French Open	A	3R	F	3R	2R	A	1R	A	A	0 / 5	10–5
Wimbledon	3R	3R	3R	2R	A	A	1R	A	A	0 / 5	7–5
US Open	1R	2R	2R	1R	A	A	1R	A	A	0 / 5	2–5
Win–loss	4–3	7–4	9–4	3–3	1–1	0–1	0–4	0–1	0–1	0 / 22	24–22

== Grand Slam tournament finals ==
=== Doubles: 1 (runner-up) ===
Result	Year	Tournament	Surface	Partner	Opponents	Score
Loss	2001	French Open	Clay	(Spain) Conchita Martínez	(Spain) Virginia Ruano Pascual (Argentina) Paola Suárez	2–6, 1–6

== Other significant finals ==
=== WTA 1000 tournaments ===
==== Singles: 4 (2 titles, 2 runner-ups) ====
Result	Year	Tournament	Surface	Opponent	Score
Win	2001	Italian Open	Clay	(France) Amélie Mauresmo	7–6^{(7–3)}, 6–1
Win	2001	Kremlin Cup	Carpet (i)	(Russia) Elena Dementieva	6–3, 6–3
Loss	2001	Zurich Open	Carpet (i)	(United States) Lindsay Davenport	3–6, 1–6
Loss	2003	Zurich Open	Carpet (i)	(Belgium) Justine Henin	0–6, 4–6

==== Doubles: 3 runner-ups ====
Result	Year	Tournament	Surface	Partner	Opponents	Score
Loss	2002	Kremlin Cup	Carpet (i)	(Russia) Nadia Petrova	(Russia) Elena Dementieva (Slovakia) Janette Husárová	6–2, 3–6, 6–7^{(7–9)}
Loss	2002	Zurich Open	Hard (i)	(Russia) Nadia Petrova	(Russia) Elena Bovina (Belgium) Justine Henin	2–6, 6–7^{(2–7)}
Loss	2003	Italian Open	Clay	(Russia) Nadia Petrova	(Russia) Svetlana Kuznetsova (United States) Martina Navratilova	4–6, 7–5, 2–6

=== Summer Olympics ===
==== Singles: (4th place) ====
Result	Year	Tournament	Surface	Opponent	Score
4th place	2000	Sydney Olympics, Australia	Hard	(United States) Monica Seles	1–6, 4–6

== WTA Tour finals ==
=== Singles: 14 (6 titles, 8 runner-ups) ===
Legend WTA 1000 (Tier I) (2–2) WTA 500 (Tier II) (1–4) WTA 250 (Tier III / Tier IV / International) (3–2)	Finals by surface Hard (2–3) Grass (1–1) Clay (2–1) Carpet (1–3)

Result	W–L	Date	Tournament	Tier	Surface	Opponent	Score
Win	1–0	May 2001	Italian Open, Italy	Tier I	Clay	(France) Amélie Mauresmo	7–6^{(7–3)}, 6–1
Loss	1–1	Sep 2001	Brasil Tennis Cup, Brazil	Tier II	Hard	(United States) Monica Seles	3–6, 3–6
Win	2–1	Sep 2001	Tokyo Cup, Japan	Tier II	Hard	(Spain) Arantxa Sánchez Vicario	6–4, 6–2
Win	3–1	Oct 2001	Kremlin Cup, Russia	Tier I	Carpet (i)	(Russia) Elena Dementieva	6–3, 6–3
Loss	3–2	Oct 2001	Zurich Open, Switzerland	Tier I	Carpet (i)	(United States) Lindsay Davenport	3–6, 1–6
Loss	3–3	Oct 2001	Linz Open, Austria	Tier II	Hard (i)	(United States) Lindsay Davenport	4–6, 1–6
Loss	3–4	Feb 2002	Paris Indoors, France	Tier II	Carpet (i)	(United States) Venus Williams	w/o
Win	4–4	Apr 2002	Sarasota Classic, US	Tier IV	Clay	(Russia) Tatiana Panova	6–2, 6–2
Loss	4–5	May 2002	Internationaux de Strasbourg, France	Tier III	Clay	(Italy) Silvia Farina Elia	4–6, 6–3, 3–6
Win	5–5	Jun 2002	Birmingham Classic, UK	Tier III	Grass	(Russia) Anastasia Myskina	6–2, 6–3
Loss	5–6	Jul 2002	San Diego Open, US	Tier II	Hard	(United States) Venus Williams	2–6, 2–6
Loss	5–7	Oct 2003	Zurich Open, Switzerland	Tier I	Carpet (i)	(Belgium) Justine Henin	0–6, 4–6
Win	6–7	Mar 2011	Malaysian Open, Malaysia	International	Hard	(Czech Republic) Lucie Šafářová	2–6, 7–6^{(11–9)}, 6–4
Loss	6–8	Jun 2011	Rosmalen Open, Netherlands	International	Grass	(Italy) Roberta Vinci	7–6^{(9–7)}, 3–6, 5–7

=== Doubles: 10 (4 titles, 6 runner-ups) ===
Legend Grand Slam (0–1) WTA 1000 (Tier I) (0–3) WTA 500 (Tier II) (3–2) WTA 250 (Tier IV) (1–0)	Finals by surface Hard (2–3) Clay (1–2) Carpet (1–1)

Result	W–L	Date	Tournament	Tier	Surface	Partner	Opponent	Score
Loss	0–1	Sep 1999	Tokyo Cup, Japan	Tier II	Hard	(South Africa) Amanda Coetzer	(Spain) Conchita Martínez (Argentina) Patricia Tarabini	7–6^{(7–5)}, 4–6, 2–6
Loss	0–2	May 2001	French Open, France	Grand Slam	Clay	(Spain) Conchita Martínez	(Spain) Virginia Ruano Pascual (Argentina) Paola Suárez	2–6, 1–6
Loss	0–3	Aug 2001	Connecticut Open, US	Tier II	Hard	(Russia) Nadia Petrova	(Zimbabwe) Cara Black (Russia) Elena Likhovtseva	0–6, 6–3, 2–6
Win	1–3	Oct 2001	Linz Open, Austria	Tier II	Hard (i)	(Russia) Nadia Petrova	(Belgium) Els Callens (United States) Chanda Rubin	6–1, 6–4
Win	2–3	Apr 2002	Sarasota Classic, US	Tier IV	Clay	(Russia) Elena Likhovtseva	(Belgium) Els Callens (Spain) Conchita Martínez	6–7^{(5–7)}, 6–3, 6–3
Win	3–3	Aug 2002	LA Championships, US	Tier II	Hard	(Belgium) Kim Clijsters	(Slovakia) Daniela Hantuchová (Japan) Ai Sugiyama	6–3, 6–3
Loss	3–4	Sep 2002	Kremlin Cup, Russia	Tier I	Carpet (i)	(Russia) Nadia Petrova	(Russia) Elena Dementieva (Slovakia) Janette Husárová	6–2, 3–6, 6–7^{(7–9)}
Loss	3–5	Oct 2002	Zurich Open, Switzerland	Tier I	Hard (i)	(Russia) Nadia Petrova	(Russia) Elena Bovina (Belgium) Justine Henin	2–6, 6–7^{(2–7)}
Win	4–5	Oct 2002	Linz Open, Austria (2)	Tier II	Carpet (i)	(Russia) Nadia Petrova	(Japan) Rika Fujiwara (Japan) Ai Sugiyama	6–3, 6–2
Loss	4–6	May 2003	Italian Open, Italy	Tier I	Clay	(Russia) Nadia Petrova	(Russia) Svetlana Kuznetsova (United States) Martina Navratilova	4–6, 7–5, 2–6

== ITF Circuit finals ==
=== Singles: 10 (8 titles, 2 runner-ups) ===
Legend 100K tournaments (2–0) 75K tournaments (2–0) 50K tournaments (1–1) 25K tournaments (3–1)	Finals by surface Hard (3–1) Clay (5–0) Grass (0–1)

Result	W–L	Date	Tournament	Tier	Surface	Opponent	Score
Loss	0–1	Oct 1998	ITF Saga, Japan	25K	Grass	(Australia) Alicia Molik	4–6, 3–6
Win	1–1	May 2008	ITF Florence, Italy	25K	Clay	(Czech Republic) Lucie Hradecká	6–1, 6–3
Win	2–1	May 2008	ITF Caserta, Italy	25K	Clay	(Austria) Patricia Mayr	6–3, 6–1
Win	3–1	Jul 2008	ITF Darmstadt, Germany	25K	Clay	(Netherlands) Michelle Gerards	6–0, 6–0
Win	4–1	Oct 2009	ITF Athens, Greece	100K	Hard	(Greece) Eleni Daniilidou	6–2, 6–1
Loss	4–2	Oct 2009	Open de Touraine, France	50K	Hard	(Sweden) Sofia Arvidsson	2–6, 6–7^{(7–9)}
Win	5–2	Nov 2009	Internationaux de Poitiers, France	100K	Hard	(Sweden) Sofia Arvidsson	6–4, 6–4
Win	6–2	Jul 2010	Open Contrexéville, France	50K	Clay	(France) Olivia Sanchez	4–6, 6–3, 6–1
Win	7–2	Aug 2010	Bucharest Ladies Open, Romania	75K	Clay	(Czech Republic) Zuzana Ondrášková	3–6, 6–1, 7–6^{(7–3)}
Win	8–2	Aug 2010	Vancouver Open, Canada	75K	Hard	(France) Virginie Razzano	6–1, 6–4

=== Doubles: 1 runner-up ===
Legend 50K tournaments (0–1)	Finals by surface Clay (0–1)

Result	Date	Tournament	Tier	Surface	Partner	Opponents	Score
Loss	Jul 2010	Open Contrexéville, France	50K	Clay	(Canada) Sharon Fichman	(Russia) Nina Bratchikova (Russia) Ekaterina Ivanova	6–4, 4–6, [3–10]

== Hopman Cup final ==
Result	W–L	Date	Location	Surface	Partner	Opponents	Score
Win	1.	Jan 1999	Perth, Western Australia	Hard	(Australia) Mark Philippoussis	(Sweden) Åsa Carlsson (Sweden) Jonas Björkman	2–1

=== Exhibition ===
==== Singles: 1 win ====
Result	W–L	Date	Tournament	Surface	Opponent	Score
Win	1.	Jan 2001	Hong Kong Tennis Classic	Hard	(Russia) Anna Kournikova	7–6^{(7–3)}, 6–3

== WTA Tour career earnings ==
Year	Grand Slam titles	WTA titles	Total titles	Earnings ($)	Money list rank
1998	0	0	0	3,125	564
1999	0	0	0	160,424	54
2000	0	0	0	429,880	22
2001	0	3	3	1,169,716	7
2002	0	2	2	918,633	10
2003	0	0	0	824,798	13
2004	0	0	0	225,850	53
2005–08	0	0	0	58,008	n/a
2009	0	0	0	271,939	73
2010	0	0	0	101,126	139
2011	0	1	1	232,177	76
Career	0	6	6	4,395,676	59

Notes

- Grand Slam titles, WTA titles, Total titles – Includes singles, doubles and mixed doubles titles.

== Wins against top 10 players ==
- Dokic has a 13–51 record against players who were, at the time the match was played, ranked in the top 10.

No.	Player	Rk	Event	Surface	Rd	Score	Rk	Years	Ref
1	(Switzerland) Martina Hingis	1	Wimbledon Championships, UK	Grass	1R	6–2, 6–0	129	1999	
2	(France) Mary Pierce	7	Wimbledon Championships, UK	Grass	4R	6–4, 6–3	129	1999	
3	(United States) Venus Williams	4	Italian Open, Italy	Clay	3R	6–1, 6–2	37	2000	
4	(South Africa) Amanda Coetzer	8	Miami Open, US	Hard	4R	6–3, 7–5	28	2001	
5	(France) Amélie Mauresmo	6	Italian Open, Italy	Clay	F	7–6^{(7–3)}, 6–1	23	2001	
6	(Belgium) Kim Clijsters	5	Tokyo Open, Japan	Hard	SF	7–5, 6–4	11	2001	
7	(United States) Monica Seles	10	Paris Open, France	Carpet	SF	6–3, 3–6, 6–4	9	2002	
8	(Belgium) Justine Henin	8	Hamburg Open, Germany	Clay	QF	7–6^{(7–3)}, 7–6^{(7–3)}	9	2002	
9	(United States) Jennifer Capriati	3	San Diego Open, US	Hard	QF	2–6, 6–2, 6–4	5	2002	
10	(Switzerland) Martina Hingis	8	Canadian Open, Canada	Hard	QF	6–4, 6–3	5	2002	
11	(Belgium) Kim Clijsters	1	Zurich Open, Switzerland	Hard	SF	1–6, 6–3, 6–4	25	2003	
12	(Italy) Francesca Schiavone	5	Malaysian Open, Malaysia	Hard	1R	2–6, 7–6^{(7–1)}, 6–4	91	2011	

- Key: (Rk) first use, opponent rank; (Rd) round; (Rk) 2nd use, player rank; (Ref) reference; (F) final; (SF) semifinal; (QF) quarterfinal; (#R) rounds 4, 3, 2, 1; (RR) round-robin stage

== Awards ==
1998

- ITF World Junior Champions

2001

- Sportswoman of The Year by Olympic Committee of Yugoslavia
