= 2001 Pilot Pen Tennis – Singles =

Singles
- 2001 Pilot Pen Tennis

Final
- Champion: (United States) Venus Williams
- Runner-up: (United States) Lindsay Davenport
- Score: 7–6^{(8–6)}, 6–4

Details
- Draw: 28 (3WC/6Q)
- Seeds: 8

Events
Singles	Doubles
← 2000 ·	Connecticut Open	· 2002 →

Venus Williams was the two-time defending champion and successfully defended her title, by defeating Lindsay Davenport 7–6^{(8–6)}, 6–4 in the final.

== Seeds ==
The first four seeds received a bye into the second round.

1. (United States) Lindsay Davenport (final)
2. (United States) Jennifer Capriati (semifinals)
3. (United States) Venus Williams (champion)
4. (Belgium) Kim Clijsters (semifinals, withdrew due to a right quadriceps strain)
5. (Belgium) Justine Henin (quarterfinals)
6. (France) Amélie Mauresmo (quarterfinals)
7. (France) Nathalie Tauziat (quarterfinals)
8. (Russia) Elena Dementieva (first round)

== Draw ==
=== Key ===
- Q = Qualifier
- WC = Wild card
- LL = Lucky loser
- Alt = Alternate
- SE = Special exempt
- PR = Protected ranking
- ITF = ITF entry
- JE = Junior exempt
- w/o = Walkover
- r = Retired
- d = Defaulted
- SR = Special ranking

=== Finals ===
Semifinals
1	(United States) Lindsay Davenport	w/o
4	(Belgium) Kim Clijsters
3/WC	(United States) Venus Williams	6	7^{7}
2	(United States) Jennifer Capriati	4	6^{1}

Final
1	(United States) Lindsay Davenport	6^{6}	4
3/WC	(United States) Venus Williams	7^{8}	6

=== Top half ===
First round
Q	(Russia) A Myskina	6	7
(South Africa) A Coetzer	3	5
(Italy) S Farina Elia	1	2
(Slovakia) H Nagyová	6	6
(Bulgaria) M Maleeva	3	4
6	(France) A Mauresmo	6	6
(Argentina) P Suárez	6^{4}	2
WC	(Spain) A Sánchez Vicario	7^{7}	6
Q	(Czech Republic) K Hrdličková	1	6	6
Q	(Czech Republic) D Bedáňová	6	3	2
(United States) M Shaughnessy	2	6	5
7	(France) N Tauziat	6	2	7

Second round
1	(United States) L Davenport	6	6
Q	(Russia) A Myskina	2	1
(Slovakia) H Nagyová	6^{14}	3
6	(France) A Mauresmo	7^{16}	6
4	(Belgium) K Clijsters	6	6
WC	(Spain) A Sánchez Vicario	1	4
Q	(Czech Republic) K Hrdličková	1	6^{3}
7	(France) N Tauziat	6	7^{7}

Quarterfinals
1	(United States) L Davenport	6	6
6	(France) A Mauresmo	4	4
4	(Belgium) K Clijsters	6	6
7	(France) N Tauziat	2	2

Semifinals
1	(United States) L Davenport	w/o
4	(Belgium) K Clijsters

=== Bottom half ===
First round
5	(Belgium) J Henin	6	6
Q	(Sweden) Å Carlsson	2	3
Q	(France) N Dechy	6^{6}	4
(Austria) B Schett	7^{8}	6
(France) S Testud	6	6
WC	(United States) L Granville	4	3
8	(Russia) E Dementieva	6	5	4
(Federal Republic of Yugoslavia) J Dokic	4	7	6
(United States) L Raymond	6	6
Q	(France) V Razzano	1	2
(Spain) M Serna	2	2
(Germany) A Huber	6	6

Second round
5	(Belgium) J Henin	6	6
(Austria) B Schett	3	2
(France) S Testud	6^{5}	3
3/WC	(United States) V Williams	7^{7}	6
(Federal Republic of Yugoslavia) J Dokic	6	6
(United States) L Raymond	3	0
(Germany) A Huber	6	3	2
2	(United States) J Capriati	0	6	6

Quarterfinals
5	(Belgium) J Henin	3	7	2
3/WC	(United States) V Williams	6	5	6
(Federal Republic of Yugoslavia) J Dokic	4	3
2	(United States) J Capriati	6	6

Semifinals
3/WC	(United States) V Williams	6	7^{7}
2	(United States) J Capriati	4	6^{1}
