= 2011 Malaysian Open =

- Date: 28 February – 6 March
- Edition: 2nd
- Category: WTA International
- Draw: 32S / 16D
- Prize money: $220,000
- Surface: Hard / outdoor
- Location: Kuala Lumpur, Malaysia

Champions

Singles
- (Australia) Jelena Dokić

Doubles
- (Russia) Dinara Safina / (Kazakhstan) Galina Voskoboeva
- Malaysian Open

The 2011 BMW Malaysian Open was a tennis tournament played on outdoor hard courts. It was the second edition of the Malaysian Open and was an International tournament on the 2011 WTA Tour. This was also the first edition of the tournament to be sponsored by BMW. The tournament took place from 28 February through 6 March 2011 at the Bukit Kiara Equestrian and Country Resort.

The event was headlined by the participation of world No. 5 and French Open reigning champion Francesca Schiavone, World No. 15 Marion Bartoli, former world No. 1 Dinara Safina, the defending champion and world No. 22, Alisa Kleybanova and world No. 30 Lucie Šafářová among others. Unseeded Jelena Dokić won the singles title.

== Finals ==
=== Singles ===
(Australia) Jelena Dokić defeated (Czech Republic) Lucie Šafářová, 2–6, 7–6^{(11–9)}, 6–4.

- It was Dokić's only singles title of the year, and the sixth of her career. It was her first title since winning Birmingham in 2002.

=== Doubles ===
(Russia) Dinara Safina / (Kazakhstan) Galina Voskoboeva defeated (Thailand) Noppawan Lertcheewakarn / (Australia) Jessica Moore, 7–5, 2–6, [10–5].

== Entrants ==
=== Seeds ===
Country	Player	Ranking^{1}	Seeding
ITA	Francesca Schiavone	5	1
FRA	Marion Bartoli	18	2
RUS	Alisa Kleybanova	20	3
AUS	Jarmila Groth	31	4
CZE	Lucie Šafářová	35	5
JPN	Ayumi Morita	48	6
JPN	Kimiko Date-Krumm	53	7
SRB	Bojana Jovanovski	55	8

- ^{1} Rankings as of February 21, 2011.

=== Other entrants ===
The following players received wildcards into the main draw:

- (Australia) Jarmila Groth
- (Poland) Urszula Radwańska
- (Italy) Francesca Schiavone

The following players received entry from the qualifying draw:

- (Luxembourg) Anne Kremer
- (China) Lu Jingjing
- (Ukraine) Tetiana Luzhanska
- (China) Sun Shengnan
