= 2003 Sarasota Clay Court Classic =

- Date: March 31 – April 6
- Edition: 2nd
- Category: Tier IV
- Draw: 32S / 16D
- Prize money: $140,000
- Surface: Clay (green) / outdoor
- Location: Sarasota, Florida, U.S.

Champions

Singles
- (Russia) Anastasia Myskina

Doubles
- (South Africa) Liezel Huber / (United States) Martina Navratilova
← 2002 ·	Sarasota Clay Court Classic

The 2003 Sarasota Clay Court Classic was a women's tennis event played on outdoor green clay courts in Sarasota, Florida in the United States that was part of the Tier IV category on the 2003 WTA Tour. It was the second and last edition of the tournament and was held from March 31 through April 6, 2003. Second-seeded Anastasia Myskina won the singles title.

== Finals ==
=== Singles ===
(Russia) Anastasia Myskina defeated (Australia) Alicia Molik, 6–4, 6–1

- It was Myskina's 2nd singles title of the year and the 4th of her career.

=== Doubles ===
(South Africa) Liezel Huber / (United States) Martina Navratilova defeated (Japan) Shinobu Asagoe / (Japan) Nana Miyagi, 7–6^{(10–8)}, 6–3
