= 2001 Italian Open – Men's singles =

Men's singles
- 2001 Italian Open

Final
- Champion: (Spain) Juan Carlos Ferrero
- Runner-up: (Brazil) Gustavo Kuerten
- Score: 3–6, 6–1, 2–6, 6–4, 6–2

Details
- Draw: 64 (4WC/8Q)
- Seeds: 16

Events
Singles	men	women
Doubles	men	women
← 2000 ·	Italian Open	· 2002 →

Juan Carlos Ferrero defeated Gustavo Kuerten in the final, 3–6, 6–1, 2–6, 6–4, 6–2 to win the men's singles tennis title at the 2001 Italian Open.

Magnus Norman was the defending champion, but lost in the first round to Vincenzo Santopadre.

== Seeds ==
1. (Brazil) Gustavo Kuerten (final)
2. (Russia) Marat Safin (second round)
3. (United States) Andre Agassi (first round)
4. (United States) Pete Sampras (first round)
5. (Sweden) Magnus Norman (first round)
6. (Russia) Yevgeny Kafelnikov (second round)
7. (Australia) Lleyton Hewitt (third round)
8. (Spain) Juan Carlos Ferrero (champion)
9. (United Kingdom) Tim Henman (second round)
10. (Spain) Àlex Corretja (quarterfinals)
11. (France) Arnaud Clément (first round)
12. (France) Sébastien Grosjean (third round)
13. (Sweden) Thomas Enqvist (second round)
14. (United States) Jan-Michael Gambill (first round)
15. (Argentina) Franco Squillari (third round)
16. (Slovakia) Dominik Hrbatý (first round)

== Draw ==
=== Key ===
- Q = Qualifier
- WC = Wild card
- LL = Lucky loser
- Alt = Alternate
- ITF = ITF entry
- PR = Protected ranking
- SR = Special ranking
- SE = Special exempt
- JE = Junior exempt
- JR = Junior Accelerator Programme entrant
- CO = College Accelerator Programme entrant
- NG = Next Gen Accelerator Program entrant
- w/o = Walkover
- r = Retired
- d = Defaulted

=== Finals ===
Semifinals
1	(Brazil) Gustavo Kuerten	6	6
(Sweden) Andreas Vinciguerra	2	4
(Ecuador) Nicolás Lapentti	3	3
8	(Spain) Juan Carlos Ferrero	6	6

Final
1	(Brazil) Gustavo Kuerten	6	1	6	4	2
8	(Spain) Juan Carlos Ferrero	3	6	2	6	6

=== Top half ===
==== Section 1 ====
First round
1	(Brazil) G Kuerten	6^{4}	7	6
Q	(Croatia) I Ljubičić	7^{7}	5	4
(Spain) F Vicente	4	5
(United States) M Chang	6	7
Q	(Romania) A Voinea	3	4
(France) F Santoro	6	6
(Belarus) M Mirnyi	1	6^{5}
15	(Argentina) F Squillari	6	7^{7}
10	(Spain) À Corretja	5	7	6
(Spain) C Moyá	7	5	1
(France) N Escudé	6^{5}	4
Q	(Spain) A Portas	7^{7}	6
(Germany) T Haas	7	6
(Ukraine) A Medvedev	5	3
(Czech Republic) B Ulihrach	1	6	5
7	(Australia) L Hewitt	6	2	7

Second round
1	(Brazil) G Kuerten	6	6
(United States) M Chang	1	1
(France) F Santoro	4	0
15	(Argentina) F Squillari	6	6
10	(Spain) À Corretja	6^{4}	6	6
Q	(Spain) A Portas	7^{7}	2	4
(Germany) T Haas	5	3
7	(Australia) L Hewitt	7	6

Third round
1	(Brazil) G Kuerten	6	6
15	(Argentina) F Squillari	1	2
10	(Spain) À Corretja	7^{7}	6
7	(Australia) L Hewitt	6^{2}	4

Quarterfinals
1	(Brazil) G Kuerten	6	6
10	(Spain) À Corretja	2	3

==== Section 2 ====
First round
4	(United States) P Sampras	5	6	4
(Israel) H Levy	7	2	6
(Spain) F Clavet	6	6
(Germany) R Schüttler	1	2
(Germany) N Kiefer	6	6
(France) C Pioline	3	0
(Italy) G Pozzi	2	1
13	(Sweden) T Enqvist	6	6
12	(France) S Grosjean	6	6
(Australia) A Ilie	4	2
Q	(Spain) S Bruguera	7^{7}	7^{7}
WC	(Italy) F Volandri	6^{2}	6^{3}
(Sweden) A Vinciguerra	6	6
Q	(Brazil) F Meligeni	2	0
WC	(Italy) V Santopadre	6	6
5	(Sweden) M Norman	4	3

Second round
(Israel) H Levy	6	7^{8}
(Spain) F Clavet	4	6^{6}
(Germany) N Kiefer	7^{7}	4	6
13	(Sweden) T Enqvist	6^{4}	6	3
12	(France) S Grosjean	7	3	7
Q	(Spain) S Bruguera	5	6	5
(Sweden) A Vinciguerra	3	7	6
WC	(Italy) V Santopadre	6	5	3

Third round
(Israel) H Levy	6	6
(Germany) N Kiefer	2	4
12	(France) S Grosjean	2	3
(Sweden) A Vinciguerra	6	6

Quarterfinals
(Israel) H Levy	6^{7}	2
(Sweden) A Vinciguerra	7^{9}	6

=== Bottom half ===
==== Section 3 ====
First round
6	(Russia) Y Kafelnikov	7	3
(Romania) A Pavel	5	1	r
Q	(Spain) J Díaz	6	6
(Argentina) M Puerta	1	2
(Belarus) V Voltchkov	2	3
(Morocco) H Arazi	6	6
WC	(Italy) F Luzzi	6	1	6
11	(France) A Clément	2	6	3
14	(United States) J-M Gambill	5	4
(Argentina) G Coria	7	6
(Ecuador) N Lapentti	6	6
(Argentina) G Gaudio	3	2
Q	(Spain) F Mantilla	6	7^{7}
WC	(Italy) M Navarra	3	6^{5}
(Spain) Á Calatrava	6	6
3	(United States) A Agassi	3	3

Second round
6	(Russia) Y Kafelnikov	6^{3}	6	5
Q	(Spain) J Díaz	7^{7}	1	7
(Morocco) H Arazi	3	6^{4}
WC	(Italy) F Luzzi	6	7^{7}
(Argentina) G Coria	6	3	5
(Ecuador) N Lapentti	3	6	7
Q	(Spain) F Mantilla	3	6	7^{7}
(Spain) Á Calatrava	6	3	6^{3}

Third round
Q	(Spain) J Díaz	6	6
WC	(Italy) F Luzzi	3	1
(Ecuador) N Lapentti	6	2	7^{7}
Q	(Spain) F Mantilla	3	6	6^{4}

Quarterfinals
Q	(Spain) J Díaz	6	1	2
(Ecuador) N Lapentti	3	6	6

==== Section 4 ====
First round
8	(Spain) J C Ferrero	6	7
(Netherlands) S Schalken	3	5
(Italy) D Sanguinetti	6	3	4
(Chile) M Ríos	4	6	6
(United States) T Martin	3	3
Q	(France) J Boutter	6	6
(Spain) A Costa	2	6	1
9	(United Kingdom) T Henman	6	3	6
16	(Slovakia) D Hrbatý	2	4
(South Africa) W Ferreira	6	6
(United Kingdom) G Rusedski	6	6
(Germany) D Prinosil	3	2
(Switzerland) R Federer	7^{7}	4	7^{7}
(Sweden) T Johansson	6^{3}	6	6^{5}
(Sweden) J Björkman	2	6	5
2	(Russia) M Safin	6	3	7

Second round
8	(Spain) J C Ferrero	6	6
(Chile) M Ríos	1	3
Q	(France) J Boutter	2	6	6
9	(United Kingdom) T Henman	6	3	4
(South Africa) W Ferreira	6	6
(United Kingdom) G Rusedski	4	4
(Switzerland) R Federer	4	6	7^{7}
2	(Russia) M Safin	6	4	6^{5}

Third round
8	(Spain) J C Ferrero	6	6
Q	(France) J Boutter	3	2
(South Africa) W Ferreira	7^{7}	6
(Switzerland) R Federer	6^{4}	2

Quarterfinals
8	(Spain) J C Ferrero	6	6
(South Africa) W Ferreira	0	2

== Qualifying ==
=== Qualifying seeds ===
1. (Spain) Albert Portas (qualified)
2. (France) Arnaud Di Pasquale (qualifying competition)
3. (Australia) Wayne Arthurs (qualifying competition)
4. (Spain) Galo Blanco (first round)
5. (Spain) Sergi Bruguera (qualified)
6. (Croatia) Ivan Ljubičić (qualified)
7. (Russia) Mikhail Youzhny (qualifying competition)
8. (Argentina) Mariano Zabaleta (qualifying competition)
9. (Argentina) Agustín Calleri (qualifying competition)
10. (Spain) Félix Mantilla (qualified)
11. (France) Julien Boutter (qualified)
12. (Spain) Tommy Robredo (first round)
13. (Austria) Markus Hipfl (first round)
14. (Russia) Andrei Stoliarov (first round)
15. (Brazil) Fernando Meligeni (qualified)
16. (Germany) Lars Burgsmüller (qualifying competition)

=== Qualifiers ===
1. (Spain) Albert Portas
2. (Romania) Adrian Voinea
3. (Brazil) Fernando Meligeni
4. (Spain) Jacobo Díaz
5. (Spain) Sergi Bruguera
6. (Croatia) Ivan Ljubičić
7. (France) Julien Boutter
8. (Spain) Félix Mantilla

=== Qualifying draw ===
==== First qualifier ====
First round
1	(Spain) Albert Portas	6	6
WC	(Italy) Daniele Bracciali	2	4
(Italy) Andrea Gaudenzi	6	6
14	(Russia) Andrei Stoliarov	0	3

Qualifying competition
1	(Spain) Albert Portas	6	7
(Italy) Andrea Gaudenzi	2	5

==== Second qualifier ====
First round
2	(France) Arnaud Di Pasquale	6	6
WC	(Croatia) Goran Ivanišević	4	3
(Romania) Adrian Voinea	6	3	7^{7}
12	(Spain) Tommy Robredo	4	6	6^{2}

Qualifying competition
2	(France) Arnaud Di Pasquale	1	6^{5}
(Romania) Adrian Voinea	6	7^{7}

==== Third qualifier ====
First round
3	(Australia) Wayne Arthurs	4	6	7^{7}
(Morocco) Karim Alami	6	2	6^{5}
WC	(Italy) Stefano Galvani	1	0
15	(Brazil) Fernando Meligeni	6	6

Qualifying competition
3	(Australia) Wayne Arthurs	6^{9}	6	1
15	(Brazil) Fernando Meligeni	7^{11}	4	6

==== Fourth qualifier ====
First round
4	(Spain) Galo Blanco	4	1
(Spain) Jacobo Díaz	6	6
(Spain) Germán Puentes	6	6
13	(Austria) Markus Hipfl	4	4

Qualifying competition
(Spain) Jacobo Díaz	6^{3}	7	6
(Spain) Germán Puentes	7^{7}	5	4

==== Fifth qualifier ====
First round
5	(Spain) Sergi Bruguera	2	6	6
(Germany) Markus Hantschk	6	2	1
(United States) Jeff Tarango	2	3
16	(Germany) Lars Burgsmüller	6	6

Qualifying competition
5	(Spain) Sergi Bruguera	6	6
16	(Germany) Lars Burgsmüller	1	2

==== Sixth qualifier ====
First round
6	(Croatia) Ivan Ljubičić	7^{7}	6
(Germany) Daniel Elsner	6^{0}	4
(Germany) Christian Vinck	6^{3}	2
9	(Argentina) Agustín Calleri	7^{7}	6

Qualifying competition
6	(Croatia) Ivan Ljubičić	6	6
9	(Argentina) Agustín Calleri	3	4

==== Seventh qualifier ====
First round
7	(Russia) Mikhail Youzhny	6	6
(United States) Bob Bryan	2	4
(Armenia) Sargis Sargsian	3	6	1
11	(France) Julien Boutter	6	1	6

Qualifying competition
7	(Russia) Mikhail Youzhny	1	1
11	(France) Julien Boutter	6	6

==== Eighth qualifier ====
First round
8	(Argentina) Mariano Zabaleta	7^{7}	7
WC	(Italy) Marco Meneschincheri	6^{3}	5
(Russia) Nikolay Davydenko	0	2
10	(Spain) Félix Mantilla	6	6

Qualifying competition
8	(Argentina) Mariano Zabaleta	2	6	3
10	(Spain) Félix Mantilla	6	1	6
