= 2002 Sarasota Clay Court Classic =

- Date: April 1–7
- Edition: 1st
- Category: Tier IV
- Draw: 32S / 16D
- Prize money: $140,000
- Surface: Clay (green) / outdoor
- Location: Sarasota, Florida, U.S.

Champions

Singles
- (Federal Republic of Yugoslavia) Jelena Dokic

Doubles
- (Federal Republic of Yugoslavia) Jelena Dokic / (Russia) Elena Likhovtseva
Sarasota Clay Court Classic	· 2003 →

The 2002 Sarasota Clay Court Classic was a women's tennis event played on outdoor green clay courts in Sarasota, Florida in the United States that was part of the Tier IV category on the 2002 WTA Tour. It was the inaugural edition of the tournament and was held from April 1 through April 7, 2002. First-seeded Jelena Dokić won the singles title.

== Finals ==
=== Singles ===
(Federal Republic of Yugoslavia) Jelena Dokic defeated (Russia) Tatiana Panova, 6–2, 6–2

- It was Dokić' 1st singles title of the year and the 4th of her career.

=== Doubles ===
(Federal Republic of Yugoslavia) Jelena Dokic / (Russia) Elena Likhovtseva defeated (Belgium) Els Callens / (Spain) Conchita Martínez, 6–7^{(5–7)}, 6–3, 6–3
