= 2001 Italian Open – Men's doubles =

Men's doubles
- 2001 Italian Open

Final
- Champions: (South Africa) Wayne Ferreira (Russia) Yevgeny Kafelnikov
- Runners-up: (Canada) Daniel Nestor (Australia) Sandon Stolle
- Score: 6–4, 7–6^{(8–6)}

Events
| Singles | men | women |
| Doubles | men | women |
| ← 2000 · | Italian Open | · 2002 → |

Martin Damm and Dominik Hrbatý were the defending champions but only Hrbatý competed that year with Jeff Tarango.

Hrbatý and Tarango lost in the first round to Mosé Navarra and Vincenzo Santopadre.

Wayne Ferreira and Yevgeny Kafelnikov won in the final 6–4, 7–6^{(8–6)} against Daniel Nestor and Sandon Stolle.

== Seeds ==
1. (Canada) Daniel Nestor / (Australia) Sandon Stolle (final)
2. (Czech Republic) Jiří Novák / (Czech Republic) David Rikl (second round)
3. (Australia) Joshua Eagle / (Australia) Andrew Florent (first round)
4. (South Africa) Ellis Ferreira / (United States) Donald Johnson (quarterfinals)
5. (South Africa) Wayne Ferreira / (Russia) Yevgeny Kafelnikov (champions)
6. (Belarus) ~~Max Mirnyi / (Germany) David Prinosil~~ (withdrew)
7. (Australia) Wayne Arthurs / (Federal Republic of Yugoslavia) Nenad Zimonjić (first round)
8. (Sweden) Jonas Björkman / (Switzerland) Roger Federer (first round)

== Draw ==
=== Key ===
- Q = Qualifier
- WC = Wild card
- LL = Lucky loser
- Alt = Alternate
- ITF = ITF entry
- PR = Protected ranking
- SR = Special ranking
- SE = Special exempt
- JE = Junior exempt
- JR = Junior Accelerator Programme entrant
- CO = College Accelerator Programme entrant
- NG = Next Gen Accelerator Program entrant
- w/o = Walkover
- r = Retired
- d = Defaulted

=== Final ===
Semifinals
1 | (Canada) Daniel Nestor (Australia) Sandon Stolle | 6 | 6
(Czech Republic) Petr Pála (Czech Republic) Pavel Vízner | 2 | 3
(Argentina) Lucas Arnold (Czech Republic) Cyril Suk | 6^{2} | 3
5 | (South Africa) Wayne Ferreira (Russia) Yevgeny Kafelnikov | 7^{7} | 6

Final
1 | (Canada) Daniel Nestor (Australia) Sandon Stolle | 4 | 6^{6}
5 | (South Africa) Wayne Ferreira (Russia) Yevgeny Kafelnikov | 6 | 7^{8}

=== Top half ===
First round
1 | (Canada) D Nestor (Australia) S Stolle | 6 | 6
(United States) J-M Gambill (United States) S Humphries | 3 | 2
(Zimbabwe) W Black (Zimbabwe) K Ullyett | 6 | 4 | 2
(Japan) T Shimada (South Africa) M Wakefield | 4 | 6 | 6
(Spain) T Carbonell (Australia) M Hill | 3 | 4
(Argentina) P Albano (Australia) D Macpherson | 6 | 6
(United States) B Bryan (United States) M Bryan | 2 | 6 | 6
8 | (Sweden) J Björkman (Switzerland) R Federer | 6 | 3 | 0
3 | (Australia) J Eagle (Australia) A Florent | 4 | 7^{7} | 2
WC | (France) A Clément (France) S Grosjean | 6 | 6^{3} | 6
WC | (Italy) D Bracciali (Italy) F Luzzi | 1 | 0^{r}
(Argentina) G Etlis (Russia) A Olhovskiy | 6 | 2
Q | (Spain) J C Ferrero (Sweden) A Vinciguerra | 2 | 4
(Czech Republic) P Pála (Czech Republic) P Vízner | 6 | 6
WC | (Sweden) T Johansson (Sweden) M Norman | 3 | 2
LL | (Argentina) M Hood (Argentina) S Prieto | 6 | 6

Second round
1 | (Canada) D Nestor (Australia) S Stolle | 7^{9} | 6
(Japan) T Shimada (South Africa) M Wakefield | 6^{7} | 4
(Argentina) P Albano (Australia) D Macpherson | 3 | 6 | 1
(United States) B Bryan (United States) M Bryan | 6 | 4 | 6
WC | (France) A Clément (France) S Grosjean | 3 | 5
(Argentina) G Etlis (Russia) A Olhovskiy | 6 | 7
(Czech Republic) P Pála (Czech Republic) P Vízner | 4 | 6 | 6
LL | (Argentina) M Hood (Argentina) S Prieto | 6 | 4 | 3

Quarterfinals
1 | (Canada) D Nestor (Australia) S Stolle | 6 | 7^{7}
(United States) B Bryan (United States) M Bryan | 2 | 6^{1}
(Argentina) G Etlis (Russia) A Olhovskiy | 5 | 4
(Czech Republic) P Pála (Czech Republic) P Vízner | 7 | 6

Semifinals
1 | (Canada) D Nestor (Australia) S Stolle | 6 | 6
(Czech Republic) P Pála (Czech Republic) P Vízner | 2 | 3

=== Bottom half ===
First round
7 | (Australia) W Arthurs (Federal Republic of Yugoslavia) N Zimonjić | 7^{7} | 3 | 6^{5}
Q | (Sweden) S Aspelin (Germany) M-K Goellner | 6^{5} | 6 | 7^{7}
(Argentina) L Arnold (Czech Republic) C Suk | 6 | 6
WC | (Italy) G Galimberti (Italy) E Grossi | 4 | 3
(The Bahamas) M Knowles (United States) A O'Brien | 4 | 6 | 0
(Brazil) J Oncins (Argentina) D Orsanic | 6 | 2 | 6
(South Africa) C Haggard (Belgium) T Vanhoudt | 3 | 5
4 | (South Africa) E Ferreira (United States) D Johnson | 6 | 7
5 | (South Africa) W Ferreira (Russia) Y Kafelnikov | 6 | 6
(South Africa) D Adams (Argentina) M García | 2 | 4
WC | (Italy) M Navarra (Italy) V Santopadre | 6 | 6
(Slovakia) D Hrbatý (United States) J Tarango | 4 | 4
(India) M Bhupathi (India) L Paes | 6 | 6^{5} | 5
WC | (United States) A Agassi (Australia) L Hewitt | 2 | 7^{7} | 7
(Australia) A Kratzmann (France) F Santoro | 4 | 4
2 | (Czech Republic) J Novák (Czech Republic) D Rikl | 6 | 6

Second round
Q | (Sweden) S Aspelin (Germany) M-K Goellner | 2 | 6^{5}
(Argentina) L Arnold (Czech Republic) C Suk | 6 | 7^{7}
(Brazil) J Oncins (Argentina) D Orsanic | 2 | 6 | 5
4 | (South Africa) E Ferreira (United States) D Johnson | 6 | 4 | 7
5 | (South Africa) W Ferreira (Russia) Y Kafelnikov | 6 | 2 | 6
WC | (Italy) M Navarra (Italy) V Santopadre | 3 | 6 | 1
WC | (United States) A Agassi (Australia) L Hewitt | 6 | 6^{4} | 6
2 | (Czech Republic) J Novák (Czech Republic) D Rikl | 4 | 7^{7} | 4

Quarterfinals
(Argentina) L Arnold (Czech Republic) C Suk | 6 | 6
4 | (South Africa) E Ferreira (United States) D Johnson | 4 | 4
5 | (South Africa) W Ferreira (Russia) Y Kafelnikov | 3 | 7^{7} | 6
WC | (United States) A Agassi (Australia) L Hewitt | 6 | 6^{3} | 1

Semifinals
(Argentina) L Arnold (Czech Republic) C Suk | 6^{2} | 3
5 | (South Africa) W Ferreira (Russia) Y Kafelnikov | 7^{7} | 6
