= 2001 Italian Open (tennis) =

- Date: 7–13 May (men); 14–20 May (women)
- Edition: 58th
- Surface: Clay / outdoor
- Location: Rome, Italy
- Venue: Foro Italico

Champions

Men's singles
- (Spain) Juan Carlos Ferrero

Women's singles
- (Federal Republic of Yugoslavia) Jelena Dokić

Men's doubles
- (South Africa) Wayne Ferreira / (Russia) Yevgeny Kafelnikov

Women's doubles
- (Zimbabwe) Cara Black / (Russia) Elena Likhovtseva
← 2000 ·	Italian Open	· 2002 →

The 2001 Italian Open also known as 2001 Rome Masters was a tennis tournament played on outdoor clay courts. It was the 58th edition of the Italian Open and was part of the Tennis Masters Series of the 2001 ATP Tour and of Tier I of the 2001 WTA Tour. Both the men's and women's events took place at the Foro Italico in Rome in Italy. The men's tournament was played from 7 May through 13 May 2001 while the women's tournament was played from 14 May through 20 May 2001.

== Finals ==
=== Men's singles ===
(Spain) Juan Carlos Ferrero defeated (Brazil) Gustavo Kuerten 3–6, 6–1, 2–6, 6–4, 6–2

- It was Ferrero's 4th title of the year and the 5th of his career. It was his 1st Masters title.

=== Women's singles ===
(Federal Republic of Yugoslavia) Jelena Dokić defeated (France) Amélie Mauresmo 7–6^{(7–3)}, 6–1

- It was Dokić's 1st title of her career.

=== Men's doubles ===
(South Africa) Wayne Ferreira / (Russia) Yevgeny Kafelnikov defeated (Canada) Daniel Nestor / (Australia) Sandon Stolle 6–4, 7–6^{(8–6)}

- It was Ferreira's 2nd title of the year and the 24th of his career. It was Kafelnikov's 3rd title of the year and the 46th of his career.

=== Women's doubles ===
(Zimbabwe) Cara Black / (Russia) Elena Likhovtseva defeated (Argentina) Paola Suárez / (Argentina) Patricia Tarabini 6–1, 6–1

- It was Black's 3rd title of the year and the 4th of her career. It was Likhovtseva's 3rd title of the year and the 12th of her career.
