= 2000 Italian Open – Women's doubles =

Women's doubles
- 2000 Italian Open

Final
- Champions: (United States) Lisa Raymond (Australia) Rennae Stubbs
- Runners-up: (Spain) Arantxa Sánchez Vicario (Spain) Magüi Serna
- Score: 6–3, 4–6, 6–2

Events
Singles	men	women
Doubles	men	women
← 1999 ·	Italian Open	· 2001 →

Martina Hingis and Anna Kournikova were the defending champions, but none of them competed this year.

Lisa Raymond and Rennae Stubbs won the title by defeating Arantxa Sánchez Vicario and Magüi Serna 6–3, 4–6, 6–2 in the final. It was the 16th title for Raymond and the 22nd title for Stubbs in their respective doubles careers. It was also the 2nd title for the pair during the season, after their win in the Australian Open.

== Seeds ==
The first four seeds received a bye into the second round.

1. (United States) Lindsay Davenport / (United States) Corina Morariu (quarterfinals, withdrew)
2. (United States) Lisa Raymond / (Australia) Rennae Stubbs (champions)
3. (France) Julie Halard-Decugis / (Japan) Ai Sugiyama (quarterfinals)
4. (France) Alexandra Fusai / (France) Nathalie Tauziat (second round)
5. (United States) Chanda Rubin / (France) Sandrine Testud (second round)
6. (Russia) Elena Likhovtseva / (Netherlands) Caroline Vis (first round)
7. (United States) Kimberly Po / (France) Anne-Gaëlle Sidot (second round)
8. (United States) Nicole Arendt / (Netherlands) Manon Bollegraf (first round)

== Draw ==
=== Key ===
- Q = Qualifier
- WC = Wild card
- LL = Lucky loser
- Alt = Alternate
- ITF = ITF entry
- PR = Protected ranking
- SR = Special ranking
- SE = Special exempt
- JE = Junior exempt
- JR = Junior Accelerator Programme entrant
- CO = College Accelerator Programme entrant
- NG = Next Gen Accelerator Program entrant
- w/o = Walkover
- r = Retired
- d = Defaulted

=== Finals ===
Semifinals
(Spain) Arantxa Sánchez Vicario (Spain) Magüi Serna	4	6	6
(France) Amélie Mauresmo (Belarus) Natasha Zvereva	6	2	3
(Romania) Cătălina Cristea (Romania) Ruxandra Dragomir	6	6^{4}	2
2	(United States) Lisa Raymond (Australia) Rennae Stubbs	4	7^{7}	6

Final
(Spain) Arantxa Sánchez Vicario (Spain) Magüi Serna	3	6	2
2	(United States) Lisa Raymond (Australia) Rennae Stubbs	6	4	6

=== Top half ===
First round
(Italy) A Canepa (Italy) G Casoni	6	6
(Australia) J Dokic (Slovenia) T Pisnik	4	4
(Spain) A Sánchez Vicario (Spain) M Serna	6	7^{7}
(United States) T Snyder (United States) A Stevenson	0	6^{3}
(Austria) K Kschwendt (Germany) C Schneider	2	0
7	(United States) K Po (France) A-G Sidot	6	6
(Australia) A Ellwood (Japan) R Hiraki	2	6^{2}
WC	(Italy) F Pennetta (Italy) R Vinci	6	7^{7}
(Italy) T Garbin (Slovakia) J Husárová	6^{4}	4
(France) A Mauresmo (Belarus) N Zvereva	7^{7}	6
(United States) E deLone (Australia) N Pratt	6^{4}	1
5	(United States) C Rubin (France) S Testud	7^{7}	6

Second round
1	(United States) L Davenport (United States) C Morariu	6	6
(Italy) A Canepa (Italy) G Casoni	2	0
(Spain) A Sánchez Vicario (Spain) M Serna	6	6
7	(United States) K Po (France) A-G Sidot	1	3
4	(France) A Fusai (France) N Tauziat	3	4
WC	(Italy) F Pennetta (Italy) R Vinci	6	6
(France) A Mauresmo (Belarus) N Zvereva	7^{8}	7^{7}
5	(United States) C Rubin (France) S Testud	6^{6}	6^{5}

Quarterfinals
1	(United States) L Davenport (United States) C Morariu
(Spain) A Sánchez Vicario (Spain) M Serna	w/o
WC	(Italy) F Pennetta (Italy) R Vinci	5	4
(France) A Mauresmo (Belarus) N Zvereva	7	6

Semifinals
(Spain) A Sánchez Vicario (Spain) M Serna	4	6	6
(France) A Mauresmo (Belarus) N Zvereva	6	2	3

=== Bottom half ===
First round
6	(Russia) E Likhovtseva (Netherlands) C Vis	5	3
(Romania) C Cristea (Romania) R Dragomir	7	6
(United States) L Osterloh (United States) K Schlukebir	7^{7}	6
WC	(Italy) L Dell'Angelo (Italy) F Schiavone	6^{4}	4
(Italy) S Farina (Italy) R Grande	7^{7}	6^{4}	4
Q	(Canada) M Drake (Bulgaria) S Krivencheva	6^{1}	7^{7}	6
8	(United States) N Arendt (Netherlands) M Bollegraf	4	6	3
(Germany) A Huber (United States) M Seles	6	3	6
(Zimbabwe) C Black (Kazakhstan) I Selyutina	6	6
(Argentina) F Labat (Argentina) L Montalvo	3	2
(Czech Republic) E Martincová (Australia) B Stewart	3	4
(Czech Republic) K Hrdličková (Switzerland) P Schnyder	6	6

Second round
(Romania) C Cristea (Romania) R Dragomir	1	6	6
(United States) L Osterloh (United States) K Schlukebir	6	0	0
Q	(Canada) M Drake (Bulgaria) S Krivencheva	6^{6}	3
3	(France) J Halard-Decugis (Japan) A Sugiyama	7^{8}	6
(Germany) A Huber (United States) M Seles	4	6	6
(Zimbabwe) C Black (Kazakhstan) I Selyutina	6	0	1
(Czech Republic) K Hrdličková (Switzerland) P Schnyder	5	2
2	(United States) L Raymond (Australia) R Stubbs	7	6

Quarterfinals
(Romania) C Cristea (Romania) R Dragomir	6	3	6
3	(France) J Halard-Decugis (Japan) A Sugiyama	4	6	2
(Germany) A Huber (United States) M Seles
2	(United States) L Raymond (Australia) R Stubbs	w/o

Semifinals
(Romania) C Cristea (Romania) R Dragomir	6	6^{4}	2
2	(United States) L Raymond (Australia) R Stubbs	4	7^{7}	6
