= 2002 Pilot Pen Tennis – Doubles =

Doubles
- 2002 Pilot Pen Tennis

Final
- Champions: (Slovakia) Daniela Hantuchová (Spain) Arantxa Sánchez Vicario
- Runners-up: (Italy) Tathiana Garbin (Slovakia) Janette Husárová
- Score: 6–3, 1–6, 7–5

Details
- Draw: 16 (2WC/1Q)
- Seeds: 4

Events
Singles	Doubles
← 2001 ·	Pilot Pen Tennis	· 2003 →

Cara Black and Elena Likhovtseva were the defending champions, but were forced to withdraw in their semifinals match.

Daniela Hantuchová and Arantxa Sánchez Vicario won the title by defeating Tathiana Garbin and Janette Husárová 6–3, 1–6, 7–5 in the final.

== Seeds ==
1. (United States) Lisa Raymond / (Australia) Rennae Stubbs (first round)
2. (Spain) Virginia Ruano Pascual / (Argentina) Paola Suárez (semifinals)
3. (Zimbabwe) Cara Black / (Russia) Elena Likhovtseva (semifinals, withdrew)
4. (Slovakia) Daniela Hantuchová / (Spain) Arantxa Sánchez Vicario (champions)

== Draw ==
=== Key ===
- Q = Qualifier
- WC = Wild card
- LL = Lucky loser
- Alt = Alternate
- SE = Special exempt
- PR = Protected ranking
- ITF = ITF entry
- JE = Junior exempt
- w/o = Walkover
- r = Retired
- d = Defaulted
- SR = Special ranking

=== Draw ===
First round
1	(United States) L Raymond (Australia) R Stubbs	4	6^{2}
(Italy) T Garbin (Slovakia) J Husárová	6	7^{7}
(Belgium) E Callens (Russia) N Petrova	3	3
(South Africa) N de Villiers (Belarus) N Zvereva	6	6
3	(Zimbabwe) C Black (Russia) E Likhovtseva	6	6
(Australia) N Pratt (Sweden) Å Svensson	4	0
(Slovenia) T Križan (Slovenia) K Srebotnik	6	6
(Italy) R Grande (Argentina) P Tarabini	3	4
(Italy) S Farina Elia (Austria) B Schett	6	7
Q	(Indonesia) W Prakusya (Indonesia) A Widjaja	1	5
(Spain) C Martínez (Spain) M Serna	3	2
4	(Slovakia) D Hantuchová (Spain) A Sánchez Vicario	6	6
WC	(France) A Mauresmo (Switzerland) P Schnyder	6	1	6
WC	(United States) M Navratilova (Uzbekistan) I Tulyaganova	4	6	4
(Czech Republic) D Bedáňová (Russia) E Bovina	4	6	5
2	(Spain) V Ruano Pascual (Argentina) P Suárez	6	4	7

Quarterfinals
(Italy) T Garbin (Slovakia) J Husárová	7	7
(South Africa) N de Villiers (Belarus) N Zvereva	5	5
3	(Zimbabwe) C Black (Russia) E Likhovtseva	6	6
(Slovenia) T Križan (Slovenia) K Srebotnik	4	2
(Italy) S Farina Elia (Austria) B Schett	2	7	4
4	(Slovakia) D Hantuchová (Spain) A Sánchez Vicario	6	5	6
WC	(France) A Mauresmo (Switzerland) P Schnyder
2	(Spain) V Ruano Pascual (Argentina) P Suárez	w/o

Semifinals
(Italy) T Garbin (Slovakia) J Husárová	w/o
3	(Zimbabwe) C Black (Russia) E Likhovtseva
4	(Slovakia) D Hantuchová (Spain) A Sánchez Vicario	6	6
2	(Spain) V Ruano Pascual (Argentina) P Suárez	2	2

Final
(Italy) T Garbin (Slovakia) J Husárová	3	6	5
4	(Slovakia) D Hantuchová (Spain) A Sánchez Vicario	6	1	7
