= 2000 Pilot Pen Tennis – Doubles =

Doubles
- 2000 Pilot Pen Tennis

Final
- Champions: (France) Julie Halard-Decugis (Japan) Ai Sugiyama
- Runners-up: (Spain) Virginia Ruano Pascual (Argentina) Paola Suárez
- Score: 6–4, 5–7, 6–2

Details
- Draw: 16
- Seeds: 4

Events
Singles	Doubles
← 1999 ·	Pilot Pen Tennis	· 2001 →

Lisa Raymond and Rennae Stubbs were the defending champions, but lost in semifinals to Virginia Ruano Pascual and Paola Suárez.

Julie Halard-Decugis and Ai Sugiyama won the title by defeating Virginia Ruano Pascual and Paola Suárez 6–4, 5–7, 6–2 in the final.

== Seeds ==
1. (United States) Lisa Raymond / (Australia) Rennae Stubbs (semifinals)
2. (France) Julie Halard-Decugis / (Japan) Ai Sugiyama (champions)
3. (Spain) Virginia Ruano Pascual / (Argentina) Paola Suárez (final)
4. (Zimbabwe) Cara Black / (Russia) Elena Likhovtseva (first round)

== Draw ==
Key

- Q = Qualifier
- WC = Wild card
- LL = Lucky loser
- Alt = Alternate
- ITF = ITF entry
- PR = Protected ranking
- SR = Special ranking
- SE = Special exempt
- JE = Junior exempt
- JR = Junior Accelerator Programme entrant
- CO = College Accelerator Programme entrant
- NG = Next Gen Accelerator Program entrant
- w/o = Walkover
- r = Retired
- d = Defaulted

=== Draw ===
First round
1	(United States) L Raymond (Australia) R Stubbs	6	6
(Belgium) E Callens (Belgium) D van Roost	2	3
Q	(Russia) A Myskina (Slovenia) T Pisnik	6	7^{7}
(United States) E deLone (Australia) N Pratt	3	6^{5}
3	(Spain) V Ruano Pascual (Argentina) P Suárez	6	7
(Netherlands) K Boogert (Netherlands) M Oremans	4	5
(Australia) J Dokic (Croatia) J Kostanić	4	6	5
(South Africa) L Horn (Argentina) L Montalvo	6	3	7
(Czech Republic) K Hrdličková (Switzerland) P Schnyder	6	6
(Belgium) S Appelmans (United States) K Po	2	1
WC	(United States) M Navratilova (Slovenia) K Srebotnik	6	6
4	(Zimbabwe) C Black (Russia) E Likhovtseva	1	4
(Romania) C Cristea (Romania) R Dragomir	7	2	6
(Italy) R Grande (Slovakia) K Habšudová	5	6	2
(Sweden) Å Carlsson (Canada) S Jeyaseelan	3	3
2	(France) J Halard-Decugis (Japan) A Sugiyama	6	6

Quarterfinals
1	(United States) L Raymond (Australia) R Stubbs	7^{7}	4	6
Q	(Russia) A Myskina (Slovenia) T Pisnik	6^{5}	6	0
3	(Spain) V Ruano Pascual (Argentina) P Suárez	6	3	6
(South Africa) L Horn (Argentina) L Montalvo	4	6	3
(Czech Republic) K Hrdličková (Switzerland) P Schnyder	4	0
WC	(United States) M Navratilova (Slovenia) K Srebotnik	6	6
(Romania) C Cristea (Romania) R Dragomir	6^{6}	2
2	(France) J Halard-Decugis (Japan) A Sugiyama	7^{8}	6

Semifinals
1	(United States) L Raymond (Australia) R Stubbs	4	4
3	(Spain) V Ruano Pascual (Argentina) P Suárez	6	6
WC	(United States) M Navratilova (Slovenia) K Srebotnik	3	2
2	(France) J Halard-Decugis (Japan) A Sugiyama	6	6

Final
3	(Spain) V Ruano Pascual (Argentina) P Suárez	4	7	2
2	(France) J Halard-Decugis (Japan) A Sugiyama	6	5	6
