= 2001 Italian Open – Women's doubles =

Women's doubles
- 2001 Italian Open

Final
- Champions: (Zimbabwe) Cara Black (Russia) Elena Likhovtseva
- Runners-up: (Argentina) Paola Suárez (Argentina) Patricia Tarabini
- Score: 6–1, 6–1

Events
Singles	men	women
Doubles	men	women
← 2000 ·	Italian Open	· 2002 →

2001 Italian Open women's doubles took place May 14–20, 2001.

Lisa Raymond and Rennae Stubbs were the reigning champions. They did not defend their title.

Cara Black and Elena Likhovtseva won in the final 6–1, 6–1 against Paola Suárez and Patricia Tarabini.

== Seeds ==
1. (Zimbabwe) Cara Black / (Russia) Elena Likhovtseva (champions)
2. (France) Anne-Gaëlle Sidot / (France) Sandrine Testud (second round)
3. (France) Mary Pierce / (Japan) Ai Sugiyama (quarterfinals)
4. (United States) Nicole Arendt / (Netherlands) Caroline Vis (second round)
5. (Argentina) Paola Suárez / (Argentina) Patricia Tarabini (final)
6. (France) Alexandra Fusai / (Italy) Rita Grande (first round)
7. (Italy) ~~Tathiana Garbin~~ / (Slovakia) ~~Janette Husárová~~ (withdrew)
8. (United States) Martina Navratilova / (Spain) Arantxa Sánchez Vicario (second round)

== Draw ==
=== Key ===
- Q = Qualifier
- WC = Wild card
- LL = Lucky loser
- Alt = Alternate
- ITF = ITF entry
- PR = Protected ranking
- SR = Special ranking
- SE = Special exempt
- JE = Junior exempt
- JR = Junior Accelerator Programme entrant
- CO = College Accelerator Programme entrant
- NG = Next Gen Accelerator Program entrant
- w/o = Walkover
- r = Retired
- d = Defaulted

=== Finals ===
Semifinals
1	(Zimbabwe) Cara Black (Russia) Elena Likhovtseva	6	6
(Federal Republic of Yugoslavia) Jelena Dokic (Spain) Conchita Martínez	2	4
Q	(Slovakia) Daniela Hantuchová (Slovakia) Henrieta Nagyová	4	4
5	(Argentina) Paola Suárez (Argentina) Patricia Tarabini	6	6

Final
1	(Zimbabwe) Cara Black (Russia) Elena Likhovtseva	6	6
5	(Argentina) Paola Suárez (Argentina) Patricia Tarabini	1	1

=== Top half ===
First round
(Romania) R Dragomir-Ilie (Italy) S Farina Elia	1	4
(Germany) B Lamade (Switzerland) P Schnyder	6	6
(Slovakia) K Habšudová (Canada) S Jeyaseelan	7^{7}	6
(Belgium) K Clijsters (Spain) M Serna	6^{5}	2
(South Africa) L Huber (Argentina) L Montalvo	7^{7}	6
LL	(Slovenia) M Matevžič (Romania) A Vanc	6^{5}	0
(Federal Republic of Yugoslavia) J Dokic (Spain) C Martínez	6	6
WC	(Italy) Ad Serra Zanetti (Italy) An Serra Zanetti	3	4
(Italy) G Casoni (Italy) R Vinci	5	6	3
(Croatia) I Majoli (Austria) B Schett	7	1	6
(United States) E deLone (Argentina) ME Salerni	6	5	6
6	(France) A Fusai (Italy) R Grande	4	7	3

Second round
1	(Zimbabwe) C Black (Russia) E Likhovtseva	6	6
(Germany) B Lamade (Switzerland) P Schnyder	0	2
(Slovakia) K Habšudová (Canada) S Jeyaseelan	1	4
(South Africa) L Huber (Argentina) L Montalvo	6	6
4	(United States) N Arendt (Netherlands) C Vis	5	5
(Federal Republic of Yugoslavia) J Dokic (Spain) C Martínez	7	7
(Croatia) I Majoli (Austria) B Schett	2	6	3
(United States) E deLone (Argentina) ME Salerni	6	4	6

Quarterfinals
1	(Zimbabwe) C Black (Russia) E Likhovtseva	6	6
(South Africa) L Huber (Argentina) L Montalvo	3	1
(Federal Republic of Yugoslavia) J Dokic (Spain) C Martínez	6	6
(United States) E deLone (Argentina) ME Salerni	0	3

Semifinals
1	(Zimbabwe) C Black (Russia) E Likhovtseva	6	6
(Federal Republic of Yugoslavia) J Dokic (Spain) C Martínez	2	4

=== Bottom half ===
First round
8	(United States) M Navratilova (Spain) A Sánchez Vicario	7^{7}	2	6
(France) N Dechy (France) N Tauziat	6^{3}	6	3
Q	(Slovakia) D Hantuchová (Slovakia) H Nagyová	6	6
(Australia) K-A Guse (Australia) A Molik	4	3
(United States) D Graham (Germany) M Weingärtner	2	6	4
WC	(Italy) G Pizzichini (Italy) MP Zavagli	6	4	6
5	(Argentina) P Suárez (Argentina) P Tarabini	6	7^{7}
(Sweden) Å Carlsson (Australia) N Pratt	1	6^{5}
(Argentina) M Díaz Oliva (Slovenia) P Rampre	6	2	4
(Switzerland) E Gagliardi (Kazakhstan) I Selyutina	4	6	6
(South Africa) N de Villiers (Australia) A Ellwood	0	7^{7}	3
(United States) L Osterloh (United States) K Schlukebir	6	6^{5}	6

Second round
8	(United States) M Navratilova (Spain) A Sánchez Vicario	6^{4}	5
Q	(Slovakia) D Hantuchová (Slovakia) H Nagyová	7^{7}	7
WC	(Italy) G Pizzichini (Italy) MP Zavagli	5	4
3	(France) M Pierce (Japan) A Sugiyama	7	6
5	(Argentina) P Suárez (Argentina) P Tarabini	6	6
(Switzerland) E Gagliardi (Kazakhstan) I Selyutina	2	3
(United States) L Osterloh (United States) K Schlukebir	6	4	6
2	(France) A-G Sidot (France) S Testud	2	6	4

Quarterfinals
Q	(Slovakia) D Hantuchová (Slovakia) H Nagyová	6	6
3	(France) M Pierce (Japan) A Sugiyama	1	3
5	(Argentina) P Suárez (Argentina) P Tarabini	6	6
(United States) L Osterloh (United States) K Schlukebir	3	1

Semifinals
Q	(Slovakia) D Hantuchová (Slovakia) H Nagyová	4	4
5	(Argentina) P Suárez (Argentina) P Tarabini	6	6
