= 2002 Pilot Pen Tennis =

- Date: August 19–24
- Edition: 20th
- Category: Tier II
- Draw: 28S / 16D
- Prize money: USD 585,000
- Surface: Hard / outdoor
- Location: New Haven, Connecticut, U.S.
- Venue: Cullman-Heyman Tennis Center

Champions

Singles
- (United States) Venus Williams

Doubles
- (Slovakia) Daniela Hantuchová (Spain) Arantxa Sánchez Vicario
← 2001 ·	Connecticut Open	· 2003 →

The 2002 Pilot Pen Tennis was a women's tennis tournament played on outdoor hard courts. It was the 20th edition of the Pilot Pen Tennis and was part of the Tier II Series of the 2002 WTA Tour. It took place at the Cullman-Heyman Tennis Center in New Haven, United States, from August 19 through August 24, 2002. First-seeded Venus Williams won the singles title, her fourth consecutive at the event, and earned $93,000 first-prize money as well as 195 ranking points.

== Finals ==
=== Singles ===
(United States) Venus Williams defeated (United States) Lindsay Davenport 7–5, 6–0

- It was Williams' 7th singles title of the year and the 28th of her career.

=== Doubles ===
(Slovakia) Daniela Hantuchová / (Spain) Arantxa Sánchez Vicario defeated (Italy) Tathiana Garbin / (Slovakia) Janette Husárová 6–3, 1–6, 7–5
