= 2000 Italian Open (tennis) =

- Date: 8–14 May (men); 15–21 May (women)
- Edition: 57th
- Surface: Clay / outdoor
- Location: Rome, Italy
- Venue: Foro Italico

Champions

Men's singles
- (Sweden) Magnus Norman

Women's singles
- (United States) Monica Seles

Men's doubles
- (Czech Republic) Martin Damm / (Slovakia) Dominik Hrbatý

Women's doubles
- (United States) Lisa Raymond / (Australia) Rennae Stubbs
← 1999 ·	Italian Open	· 2001 →

The 2000 Italian Open was a tennis tournament played on outdoor clay courts. It was the 57th edition of the Italian Open, and was part of the ATP Masters Series of the 2000 ATP Tour, and of the Tier I Series of the 2000 WTA Tour. Both the men's and the women's events took place at the Foro Italico in Rome, Italy. The men's tournament was played from May 8 through May 14, 2000 and the women's tournament was played from May 15 through May 21, 2000.

== Finals ==
=== Men's singles ===
(Sweden) Magnus Norman defeated (Brazil) Gustavo Kuerten 6–3, 4–6, 6–4, 6–4

- It was Magnus Norman's 2nd title of the year and his 9th overall. It was his 1st Masters title.

=== Women's singles ===
(United States) Monica Seles defeated (France) Amélie Mauresmo 6–2, 7–6

- It was Monica Seles' 3rd title of the year and her 47th overall. It was her 1st Tier I title of the year and her 9th overall.

=== Men's doubles ===
(Czech Republic) Martin Damm / (Slovakia) Dominik Hrbatý defeated (South Africa) Wayne Ferreira / (Russia) Yevgeny Kafelnikov 6–4, 3–6, 6–4

=== Women's doubles ===
(United States) Lisa Raymond / (Australia) Rennae Stubbs defeated (Spain) Arantxa Sánchez Vicario / (Spain) Magüi Serna 6–3, 4–6, 6–2
