= 2003 Sarasota Clay Court Classic – Singles =

Singles
- 2003 Sarasota Clay Court Classic

Final
- Champion: (Russia) Anastasia Myskina
- Runner-up: (Australia) Alicia Molik
- Score: 6–4, 6–1

Details
- Draw: 32
- Seeds: 8

Events
Singles	Doubles
← 2002 ·	Sarasota Clay Court Classic

Jelena Dokić was the defending champion, but lost in the first round to Paola Suárez.

Anastasia Myskina won the title, defeating Alicia Molik in the final in straight sets.

== Draw ==
=== Seeds ===
1. (Socialist Federal Republic of Yugoslavia) Jelena Dokić (first round)
2. (Russia) Anastasia Myskina (champion)
3. (Switzerland) Patty Schnyder (first round)
4. (Japan) Ai Sugiyama (first round)
5. (Russia) Elena Dementieva (quarterfinals)
6. (Israel) Anna Pistolesi (second round)
7. (France) Nathalie Dechy (semifinals)
8. (Russia) Tatiana Panova (first round)

=== Key ===
- Q = Qualifier
- WC = Wild card
- LL = Lucky loser
- Alt = Alternate
- SE = Special exempt
- PR = Protected ranking
- ITF = ITF entry
- JE = Junior exempt
- w/o = Walkover
- r = Retired
- d = Defaulted
- SR = Special ranking

=== Finals ===
Semifinals
(Croatia) Iva Majoli	3	4
Q	(Australia) Alicia Molik	6	6
7	(France) Nathalie Dechy	2	4
2	(Russia) Anastasia Myskina	6	6

Final
Q	(Australia) Alicia Molik	4	1
2	(Russia) Anastasia Myskina	6	6

=== Top half ===
First round
1	(Socialist Federal Republic of Yugoslavia) J Dokić	3	3
(Argentina) P Suárez	6	6
WC	(United States) J Hopkins	6^{0}	6	6^{5}
(Slovenia) M Matevžič	7	3	7
(Croatia) I Majoli	6	4	6
WC	(Russia) A Kournikova	4	6	4
(Uzbekistan) I Tulyaganova	6	7
8	(Russia) T Panova	3	5
4	(Japan) A Sugiyama	2	5
(Spain) C Martínez	6	7
Q	(Australia) A Molik	2	6	6
(Austria) B Schett	6	1	1
(Canada) M Drake	4	6	4
(Argentina) C Fernández	6	2	6
Q	(Russia) L Krasnoroutskaia	1	6	2
6	(Israel) A Pistolesi	6	1	6

Second round
(Argentina) P Suárez	3	6	6
(Slovenia) M Matevžič	6	2	0
(Croatia) I Majoli	5	6	7
(Uzbekistan) I Tulyaganova	7	0	5
(Spain) C Martínez	2	1
Q	(Australia) A Molik	6	6
(Argentina) C Fernández	6	4	6
6	(Israel) A Pistolesi	3	6	4

Quarterfinals
(Argentina) P Suárez	6	3	2
(Croatia) I Majoli	4	6	6
Q	(Australia) A Molik	6	4
(Argentina) C Fernández	3	3	r

Semifinals
(Croatia) I Majoli	3	4
Q	(Australia) A Molik	6	6

=== Bottom half ===
First round
7	(France) N Dechy	6	6
(Czech Republic) D Chládková	4	2
(Switzerland) M-G Mikaelian	3	6	6
(Czech Republic) D Bedáňová	6	4	2
(United States) S Perry	6^{2}	2
(Thailand) T Tanasugarn	7	6
WC	(United States) A Cargill	6	2	6
3	(Switzerland) P Schnyder	4	6	4
5	(Russia) E Dementieva	3	6	6
(Slovenia) T Pisnik	6	4	1
Q	(France) M Bartoli	4	2
(France) M Pierce	6	6
Q	(Russia) N Petrova	6	6
(Russia) E Likhovtseva	4	3
(France) É Loit	0	3
2	(Russia) A Myskina	6	6

Second round
7	(France) N Dechy	6	6^{3}	6
(Switzerland) M-G Mikaelian	2	7	4
(Thailand) T Tanasugarn	1	6	4
WC	(United States) A Cargill	6	4	6
5	(Russia) E Dementieva	3	6	6
(France) M Pierce	6	1	2
Q	(Russia) N Petrova	7	4	0^{r}
2	(Russia) A Myskina	5	6	1

Quarterfinals
7	(France) N Dechy	6	6
WC	(United States) A Cargill	3	4
5	(Russia) E Dementieva	2	6	1
2	(Russia) A Myskina	6	3	6

Semifinals
7	(France) N Dechy	2	4
2	(Russia) A Myskina	6	6
