= 2002 Pilot Pen Tennis – Singles =

Singles
- 2002 Pilot Pen Tennis

Final
- Champion: (United States) Venus Williams
- Runner-up: (United States) Lindsay Davenport
- Score: 7–5, 6–0

Details
- Draw: 28 (3WC/6Q/1LL)
- Seeds: 8

Events
Singles	Doubles
- Pilot Pen Tennis

Venus Williams was the three-time defending champion and successfully defended her title by defeating Lindsay Davenport 7–5, 6–0 in the final. The final was a rematch of the prior year, where Williams also won in two sets. Williams did not lose a set for the third time out of four titles.

== Seeds ==
The first four seeds received a bye into the second round.

1. (United States) Venus Williams (champion)
2. (United States) Lindsay Davenport (final)
3. (Federal Republic of Yugoslavia) ~~Jelena Dokic~~ (withdrew)
4. (Belgium) Justine Henin (second round)
5. (Switzerland) Martina Hingis (quarterfinals)
6. (France) Amélie Mauresmo (quarterfinals)
7. (Slovakia) Daniela Hantuchová (semifinals)
8. (Russia) Elena Dementieva (first round)

== Draw ==
Key

- Q = Qualifier
- WC = Wild card
- LL = Lucky loser
- Alt = Alternate
- ITF = ITF entry
- PR = Protected ranking
- SR = Special ranking
- SE = Special exempt
- JE = Junior exempt
- JR = Junior Accelerator Programme entrant
- CO = College Accelerator Programme entrant
- NG = Next Gen Accelerator Program entrant
- w/o = Walkover
- r = Retired
- d = Defaulted

=== Finals ===
Semifinals
1	(United States) Venus Williams	6	6
7	(Slovakia) Daniela Hantuchová	3	3
(Russia) Anastasia Myskina	2	2
2	(United States) Lindsay Davenport	6	6

Final
1	(United States) Venus Williams	7	6
2	(United States) Lindsay Davenport	5	0

=== Top half ===
First round
(Thailand) T Tanasugarn	6	2	5
(United States) M Shaughnessy	4	6	7
(Czech Republic) D Bedáňová	6	4	1
Q	(United States) L Granville	3	6	6
Q	(Germany) A Rösch	6	1	6
8	(Russia) E Dementieva	3	6	3
Q	(Spain) M Marrero	4	1
(Switzerland) P Schnyder	6	6
(Italy) S Farina Elia	6	4	6^{2}
(Croatia) I Majoli	4	6	7^{7}
Q	(United States) J Hopkins	3	4
7	(Slovakia) D Hantuchová	6	6

Second round
1	(United States) V Williams	6	6
(United States) M Shaughnessy	2	4
Q	(United States) L Granville	7	6
Q	(Germany) A Rösch	5	2
LL	(Slovakia) M Suchá	6	3	3
(Switzerland) P Schnyder	2	6	6
(Croatia) I Majoli	6	4	1
7	(Slovakia) D Hantuchová	4	6	6

Quarterfinals
1	(United States) V Williams	6	6
Q	(United States) L Granville	2	1
(Switzerland) P Schnyder	4	3
7	(Slovakia) D Hantuchová	6	6

Semifinals
1	(United States) V Williams	6	6
7	(Slovakia) D Hantuchová	3	3

=== Bottom half ===
First round
5	(Switzerland) M Hingis	6	6
(Israel) A Smashnova	4	4
WC	(United States) A Stevenson	6	7
Q	(Croatia) J Kostanić	3	5
(Russia) A Myskina	6	6
WC	(Spain) C Martínez	1	4
6	(France) A Mauresmo	6	6
(Russia) T Panova	2	2
Q	(Russia) E Bovina	4	6	6
WC	(United States) L Raymond	6	1	2
(Uzbekistan) I Tulyaganova	7^{7}	6
(Spain) A Sánchez Vicario	6^{5}	3

Second round
5	(Switzerland) M Hingis	7	6
WC	(United States) A Stevenson	5	4
(Russia) A Myskina	7^{7}	6
4	(Belgium) J Henin	6^{2}	2
6	(France) A Mauresmo	6	4	7^{7}
Q	(Russia) E Bovina	4	6	6^{1}
(Uzbekistan) I Tulyaganova	4	6^{3}
2	(United States) L Davenport	6	7^{7}

Quarterfinals
5	(Switzerland) M Hingis	7^{7}	4	0
(Russia) A Myskina	6^{2}	6	6
6	(France) A Mauresmo	6^{7}	3
2	(United States) L Davenport	7^{9}	6

Semifinals
(Russia) A Myskina	2	2
2	(United States) L Davenport	6	6
