= 2011 Malaysian Open – Doubles =

Doubles
- 2011 Malaysian Open

Final
- Champions: (Russia) Dinara Safina (Kazakhstan) Galina Voskoboeva
- Runners-up: (Thailand) Noppawan Lertcheewakarn (Australia) Jessica Moore
- Score: 7–5, 2–6, [10–5]

Details
- Draw: 16
- Seeds: 4

Events
Singles	Doubles
← 2010 ·	Malaysian Open	· 2012 →

Chan Yung-jan and Zheng Jie were the defending champions, but both chose not to participate.
Dinara Safina and Galina Voskoboeva won in the final against Noppawan Lertcheewakarn and Jessica Moore, 7–5, 2–6, [10–5].

== Seeds ==
1. (Netherlands) Michaëlla Krajicek / (Germany) Tatjana Malek (first round)
2. (Italy) Alberta Brianti / (China) Zhang Shuai (Quarterfinal)
3. (Australia) Jarmila Groth / (Czech Republic) Lucie Šafářová (first round)
4. (Italy) Maria Elena Camerin / (Belarus) Darya Kustova (Quarterfinal)

== Draw ==
=== Key ===
- Q = Qualifier
- WC = Wild card
- LL = Lucky loser
- Alt = Alternate
- SE = Special exempt
- PR = Protected ranking
- ITF = ITF entry
- JE = Junior exempt
- w/o = Walkover
- r = Retired
- d = Defaulted
- SR = Special ranking

=== Draw ===
First round
1	(Netherlands) M Krajicek (Germany) T Malek	3	4
(Japan) S Aoyama (Chinese Taipei) C-w Chan	6	6
(Japan) A Nakamura (Japan) E Sema	1	4
(Russia) E Bovina (Russia) N Bratchikova	6	6
4	(Italy) ME Camerin (Belarus) D Kustova	6	6
(China) X Han (Russia) E Ivanova	2	4
WC	(Indonesia) J Rompies (Indonesia) L Tananta	4	4
WC	(Russia) D Safina (Kazakhstan) G Voskoboeva	6	6
(Turkey) Ç Büyükakçay (Kyrgyzstan) K Palkina	6	1	[3]
(Thailand) N Lertcheewakarn (Australia) J Moore	4	6	[10]
(Chinese Taipei) K-c Chang (Poland) U Radwańska	6	6
3	(Australia) J Groth (Czech Republic) L Šafářová	2	3
(Indonesia) Y Basuki (Ukraine) T Luzhanska	7	2	[7]
(China) J Lu (China) Y Xu	6^{2}	6	[10]
(China) W Liu (China) S Sun	6	3	[8]
2	(Italy) A Brianti (China) S Zhang	0	6	[10]

Quarterfinals
(Japan) S Aoyama (Chinese Taipei) C-w Chan	5	6	[10]
(Russia) E Bovina (Russia) N Bratchikova	7	3	[3]
4	(Italy) ME Camerin (Belarus) D Kustova	6^{1}	6	[4]
WC	(Russia) D Safina (Kazakhstan) G Voskoboeva	7	4	[10]
(Thailand) N Lertcheewakarn (Australia) J Moore	6	6
(Chinese Taipei) K-c Chang (Poland) U Radwańska	2	4
(China) J Lu (China) Y Xu	6	6
2	(Italy) A Brianti (China) S Zhang	4	2

Semifinals
(Japan) S Aoyama (Chinese Taipei) C-w Chan	5	4
WC	(Russia) D Safina (Kazakhstan) G Voskoboeva	7	6
(Thailand) N Lertcheewakarn (Australia) J Moore	7	1	[10]
(China) J Lu (China) Y Xu	6^{3}	6	[3]

Final
WC	(Russia) D Safina (Kazakhstan) G Voskoboeva	7	2	[10]
(Thailand) N Lertcheewakarn (Australia) J Moore	5	6	[5]
