= 2001 Pilot Pen Tennis =

- Date: August 19–25
- Edition: 19th
- Category: Tier II
- Draw: 28S / 16D
- Prize money: USD 565,000
- Surface: Hard / outdoor
- Location: New Haven, Connecticut, U.S.
- Venue: Cullman-Heyman Tennis Center

Champions

Singles
- (United States) Venus Williams

Doubles
- (Zimbabwe) Cara Black (Russia) Elena Likhovtseva
← 2000 ·	Connecticut Open	· 2002 →

The 2001 Pilot Pen Tennis was a women's tennis tournament played on outdoor hard courts. It was the 19th edition of the Pilot Pen Tennis and was part of the Tier II Series of the 2001 WTA Tour. It took place at the Cullman-Heyman Tennis Center in New Haven, United States, from August 19 through August 25, 2001. Third-seeded Venus Williams won the singles title, her third consecutive at the event, and earned $90,000 first-prize money as well as 200 ranking points.

== Finals ==
=== Singles ===
- (United States) Venus Williams defeated (United States) Lindsay Davenport 7–6^{(8–6)}, 6–4

=== Doubles ===
- (Zimbabwe) Cara Black / (Russia) Elena Likhovtseva defeated (Federal Republic of Yugoslavia) Jelena Dokić / (Russia) Nadia Petrova 6–0, 3–6, 6–2
