= 2003 Sarasota Clay Court Classic – Doubles =

Doubles
- 2003 Sarasota Clay Court Classic

Final
- Champion: (South Africa) Liezel Huber; (United States) Martina Navratilova
- Runner-up: (Japan) Shinobu Asagoe; (Japan) Nana Miyagi
- Score: 7–6^{(10–8)}, 6–3

Events
Singles	Doubles
← 2002 ·	Sarasota Clay Court Classic

Jelena Dokić and Elena Likhovtseva were the defending champions, but Likhovtseva chose not to compete in 2003. Dokić played with Nadia Petrova, but lost in the quarterfinals.

Liezel Huber and Martina Navratilova won the title.

== Results ==
=== Seeds ===
1. (Socialist Federal Republic of Yugoslavia) Jelena Dokić / (Russia) Nadia Petrova (quarterfinals)
2. (South Africa) Liezel Huber / (United States) Martina Navratilova (champions)
3. (Austria) Barbara Schett / (Switzerland) Patty Schnyder (semifinals)
4. (Belgium) Els Callens / (France) Émilie Loit (semifinals)

=== Key ===
- Q = Qualifier
- WC = Wild card
- LL = Lucky loser
- Alt = Alternate
- SE = Special exempt
- PR = Protected ranking
- ITF = ITF entry
- JE = Junior exempt
- w/o = Walkover
- r = Retired
- d = Defaulted
- SR = Special ranking

=== Draw ===
First round

Quarterfinals

Semifinals

Final

1
- (Socialist Federal Republic of Yugoslavia) J Dokić
- (Russia) N Petrova
6
6

- (Japan) R Fujiwara
- (United States) J Hopkins
3
1

1
- (Socialist Federal Republic of Yugoslavia) J Dokić
- (Russia) N Petrova

- (Russia) A Jidkova
- (Venezuela) M Vento-Kabchi
2
4

- (Japan) S Asagoe
- (Japan) N Miyagi
w/o

- (Japan) S Asagoe
- (Japan) N Miyagi
6
6

- (Japan) S Asagoe
- (Japan) N Miyagi
7
2
6

3
- (Austria) B Schett
- (Switzerland) P Schnyder
4
6
7

3
- (Austria) B Schett
- (Switzerland) P Schnyder
5
6
4

WC
- (Russia) A Myskina
- (Kazakhstan) I Selyutina
6
1
5

3
- (Austria) B Schett
- (Switzerland) P Schnyder
7
1
6

- (Japan) A Morigami
- (Japan) A Sugiyama
4
6
4

- (Italy) T Garbin
- (Slovenia) M Matevžič
6^{5}
6
1

- (Italy) T Garbin
- (Slovenia) M Matevžič
6
1
6

- (Japan) S Asagoe
- (Japan) N Miyagi
6^{8}
3

- (France) M Baroli
- (Australia) E Dominikovic
6
4
6

2
- (South Africa) L Huber
- (United States) M Navratilova
7
6

- (Russia) E Dementieva
- (Russia) L Krasnoroutskaia
1
6
3

- (France) M Baroli
- (Australia) E Dominikovic
4
4

WC
- (United States) J Craybas
- (United States) B Mattek
0
3

4
- (Belgium) E Callens
- (France) É Loit
6
6

4
- (Belgium) E Callens
- (France) É Loit
6
6

4
- (Belgium) E Callens
- (France) É Loit
1
7
6^{2}

- (Argentina) P Tarabini
- (Netherlands) C Vis
2
6
7

2
- (South Africa) L Huber
- (United States) M Navratilova
6
6^{3}
7

- (Czech Republic) D Bedáňová
- (Uzbekistan) I Tulyaganova
6
4
6^{6}

- (Argentina) P Tarabini
- (Netherlands) C Vis
6
2
2

Q
- (United States) S Reeves
- (Venezuela) M Sequera
6
1
5

2
- (South Africa) L Huber
- (United States) M Navratilova
3
6
6

2
- (South Africa) L Huber
- (United States) M Navratilova
1
6
7
