= 2001 Pilot Pen Tennis – Doubles =

Doubles
- 2001 Pilot Pen Tennis

Final
- Champions: (Zimbabwe) Cara Black (Russia) Elena Likhovtseva
- Runners-up: (Federal Republic of Yugoslavia) Jelena Dokic (Russia) Nadia Petrova
- Score: 6–0, 3–6, 6–2

Events
Singles	Doubles
← 2000 ·	Connecticut Open	· 2002 →

Julie Halard-Decugis and Ai Sugiyama were the defending champions, but none competed this year.

Cara Black and Elena Likhovtseva won the title by defeating Jelena Dokic and Nadia Petrova 6–0, 3–6, 6–2 in the final.

== Seeds ==
1. (Spain) Virginia Ruano Pascual / (Argentina) Paola Suárez (first round)
2. (Zimbabwe) Cara Black / (Russia) Elena Likhovtseva (champions)
3. (United States) Kimberly Po-Messerli / (France) Nathalie Tauziat (quarterfinals)
4. (Spain) María José Martínez Sánchez / (Spain) Anabel Medina Garrigues (first round)

== Draw ==
=== Key ===
- Q = Qualifier
- WC = Wild card
- LL = Lucky loser
- Alt = Alternate
- SE = Special exempt
- PR = Protected ranking
- ITF = ITF entry
- JE = Junior exempt
- w/o = Walkover
- r = Retired
- d = Defaulted
- SR = Special ranking

=== Draw ===
First round
1	(Spain) V Ruano Pascual (Argentina) P Suárez	5	3
(Italy) S Farina Elia (Netherlands) M Oremans	7	6
(Spain) M Serna (Argentina) P Tarabini	4	4
(Croatia) I Majoli (Slovakia) H Nagyová	6	6
4	(Spain) MJ Martínez Sánchez (Spain) A Medina Garrigues	1	4
(Federal Republic of Yugoslavia) J Dokic (Russia) N Petrova	6	6
(Italy) R Grande (Slovakia) K Habšudová	4	2
(Indonesia) W Prakusya (Germany) B Rittner	6	6
(South Africa) L Huber (Argentina) L Montalvo	6	6
(Slovakia) D Hantuchová (Spain) A Sánchez Vicario	1	2
Q	(Russia) E Dementieva (Russia) A Myskina	2	2
3	(United States) K Po-Messerli (France) N Tauziat	6	6
(France) É Loit (France) AG Sidot	6	6
WC	(United States) A Bradshaw (United States) J Hopkins	0	4
(Slovenia) T Križan (Australia) N Pratt	3	2
2	(Zimbabwe) C Black (Russia) E Likhovtseva	6	6

Quarterfinals
(Italy) S Farina Elia (Netherlands) M Oremans	7	6
(Croatia) I Majoli (Slovakia) H Nagyová	5	4
(Federal Republic of Yugoslavia) J Dokic (Russia) N Petrova	6	7
(Indonesia) W Prakusya (Germany) B Rittner	3	5
(South Africa) L Huber (Argentina) L Montalvo	6	6
3	(United States) K Po-Messerli (France) N Tauziat	1	2
(France) É Loit (France) AG Sidot	2	4
2	(Zimbabwe) C Black (Russia) E Likhovtseva	6	6

Semifinals
(Italy) S Farina Elia (Netherlands) M Oremans	3	6^{1}
(Federal Republic of Yugoslavia) J Dokic (Russia) N Petrova	6	7^{7}
(South Africa) L Huber (Argentina) L Montalvo	4	3
2	(Zimbabwe) C Black (Russia) E Likhovtseva	6	6

Final
(Federal Republic of Yugoslavia) J Dokic (Russia) N Petrova	0	6	2
2	(Zimbabwe) C Black (Russia) E Likhovtseva	6	3	6
