= 2000 Pilot Pen Tennis =

Women's tennis tournament

- Date: August 20–26
- Edition: 18th
- Category: Tier II
- Draw: 28S / 16D / 48QS / 8QD
- Prize money: USD535,000
- Surface: Hard, outdoor
- Location: New Haven, Connecticut, US
- Venue: Cullman-Heyman Tennis Center

Champions

Singles
- (United States) Venus Williams

Doubles
- (France) Julie Halard-Decugis / (Japan) Ai Sugiyama
- Connecticut Open

The 2000 Pilot Pen Tennis was a women's tennis tournament played on outdoor hard courts. It was the 18th edition of the Pilot Pen Tennis, and is part of the Tier II Series of the 2000 WTA Tour. It took place at the Cullman-Heyman Tennis Center in New Haven, Connecticut in the United States, from August 20 through August 26, 2000. First-seeded Venus Williams won the singles title.

== Finals ==
=== Singles ===
- (United States) Venus Williams defeated (United States) Monica Seles, 6–2, 6–4.

It was the 4th title for Williams in the season and the 13th title on her singles career. It was also her 2nd title in New Haven.

=== Doubles ===
- (France) Julie Halard-Decugis / (Japan) Ai Sugiyama defeated (Spain) Virginia Ruano Pascual / (Argentina) Paola Suárez, 6–4, 5–7, 6–2.

It was the 11th title for Halard-Decugis and the 14th title for Sugiyama in their respective doubles careers. It was also the 3rd title for the pair during the season, after their wins in Sydney and Miami.
