= 2001 Italian Open – Women's singles =

Women's singles
- 2001 Italian Open

Final
- Champion: (Federal Republic of Yugoslavia) Jelena Dokic
- Runner-up: (France) Amélie Mauresmo
- Score: 7–6^{(7–3)}, 6–1

Details
- Draw: 56
- Seeds: 16

Events
| Singles | men | women |
| Doubles | men | women |
| ← 2000 · | Italian Open | · 2002 → |

Jelena Dokic defeated Amélie Mauresmo in the final, 7–6^{(7–3)}, 6–1 to win the women's singles tennis title at the 2001 Italian Open.

Monica Seles was the reigning champion, but did not compete this year.

== Seeds ==
1. (Switzerland) Martina Hingis (semifinals)
2. (United States) Jennifer Capriati (second round)
3. (Spain) Conchita Martínez (semifinals)
4. (France) Amélie Mauresmo (final)
5. (France) Nathalie Tauziat (second round)
6. (Belgium) Kim Clijsters (second round)
7. (Spain) Arantxa Sánchez Vicario (quarterfinals)
8. (Bulgaria) Magdalena Maleeva (second round)
9. (Germany) Anke Huber (first round)
10. (France) Mary Pierce (first round)
11. (Belgium) ~~Justine Henin~~ (withdrew)
12. (France) Sandrine Testud (first round)
13. (United States) Meghann Shaughnessy (second round, withdrew)
14. (Federal Republic of Yugoslavia) Jelena Dokic (champion)
15. (Austria) Barbara Schett (first round)
16. (Spain) Magüi Serna (first round)
17. (Argentina) Paola Suárez (quarterfinals)

== Draw ==
=== Key ===
- Q = Qualifier
- WC = Wild card
- LL = Lucky loser
- Alt = Alternate
- ITF = ITF entry
- PR = Protected ranking
- SR = Special ranking
- SE = Special exempt
- JE = Junior exempt
- JR = Junior Accelerator Programme entrant
- CO = College Accelerator Programme entrant
- NG = Next Gen Accelerator Program entrant
- w/o = Walkover
- r = Retired
- d = Defaulted

=== Finals ===
Semifinals
1 | (Switzerland) Martina Hingis | 4 | 6^{5}
4 | (France) Amélie Mauresmo | 6 | 7^{7}
3 | (Spain) Conchita Martínez | 3 | 2
14 | (Federal Republic of Yugoslavia) Jelena Dokic | 6 | 6

Final
4 | (France) Amélie Mauresmo | 6^{3} | 1
14 | (Federal Republic of Yugoslavia) Jelena Dokic | 7^{7} | 6

=== Top half ===
==== Section 1 ====
First round
Q | (United States) J Craybas | 6 | 5 | 3
(Russia) T Panova | 3 | 7 | 6
WC | (Italy) ME Camerin | 6 | 6
(Argentina) M Díaz Oliva | 2 | 3
(Russia) E Likhovtseva | 6 | 6
15 | (Austria) B Schett | 2 | 4
9 | (Germany) A Huber | 2 | 3
(Russia) L Krasnoroutskaya | 6 | 6
(Germany) J Kandarr | 4 | 6^{1}
LL | (Spain) N Llagostera Vives | 6 | 7^{7}
(Romania) R Dragomir-Ilie | 6^{3} | 5
Q | (Germany) B Lamade | 7^{7} | 7

Second round
1 | (Switzerland) M Hingis | 6 | 6
(Russia) T Panova | 2 | 3
WC | (Italy) ME Camerin | 1 | 4
(Russia) E Likhovtseva | 6 | 6
(Russia) L Krasnoroutskaya | 6 | 6
LL | (Spain) N Llagostera Vives | 2 | 4
Q | (Germany) B Lamade | 2 | 3
7 | (Spain) A Sánchez Vicario | 6 | 6

Third round
1 | (Switzerland) M Hingis | 6 | 6
(Russia) E Likhovtseva | 4 | 3
(Russia) L Krasnoroutskaya | 1 | 2
7 | (Spain) A Sánchez Vicario | 6 | 6

Quarterfinals
1 | (Switzerland) M Hingis | 6 | 6
7 | (Spain) A Sánchez Vicario | 3 | 1

==== Section 2 ====
First round
LL | (Paraguay) R de los Ríos | 4 | 5
(Spain) Á Montolio | 6 | 7
WC | (Italy) A Serra Zanetti | 7^{7} | 2 | 4
Q | (Slovakia) D Hantuchová | 6^{3} | 6 | 6
(Slovakia) H Nagyová | 2 | 6 | 6
16 | (Spain) M Serna | 6 | 3 | 2
17 | (Argentina) P Suárez | 3 | 6 | 6
(Zimbabwe) C Black | 6 | 4 | 3
(France) N Dechy | 6 | 0 | 0
(Luxembourg) A Kremer | 4 | 6 | 6
Q | (Switzerland) E Gagliardi | 6 | 6
(United States) K Brandi | 4 | 4

Second round
4 | (France) A Mauresmo | 7^{9} | 6
(Spain) Á Montolio | 6^{7} | 3
Q | (Slovakia) D Hantuchová | 6 | 6
(Slovakia) H Nagyová | 0 | 1
17 | (Argentina) P Suárez | 5 | 6 | 7^{7}
(Luxembourg) A Kremer | 7 | 1 | 6^{1}
Q | (Switzerland) E Gagliardi | 3 | 6 | 6
6 | (Belgium) K Clijsters | 6 | 2 | 3

Third round
4 | (France) A Mauresmo | 6 | 3 | 6
Q | (Slovakia) D Hantuchová | 2 | 6 | 3
17 | (Argentina) P Suárez | 6 | 6
Q | (Switzerland) E Gagliardi | 4 | 2

Quarterfinals
4 | (France) A Mauresmo | 6 | 7
17 | (Argentina) P Suárez | 4 | 5

=== Bottom half ===
==== Section 3 ====
First round
(Japan) A Sugiyama | 4 | 0
Q | (Italy) F Schiavone | 6 | 6
LL | (Czech Republic) S Kleinová | 6 | 2 | 0
(United States) L Osterloh | 3 | 6 | 6
(Russia) N Petrova | 6 | 6
10 | (France) M Pierce | 2 | 4
13 | (United States) M Shaughnessy | 6 | 1 | 6
(Italy) R Grande | 2 | 6 | 1
(Czech Republic) D Chládková | 6 | 6
(Germany) M Weingärtner | 4 | 1
(France) A-G Sidot | 3 | 6 | 3
Q | (Slovakia) J Husárová | 6 | 1 | 6

Second round
8 | (Bulgaria) M Maleeva | 3 | 6 | 6^{1}
Q | (Italy) F Schiavone | 6 | 4 | 7^{7}
(United States) L Osterloh | 5 | 0
(Russia) N Petrova | 7 | 6
13 | (United States) M Shaughnessy
(Czech Republic) D Chládková | w/o
Q | (Slovakia) J Husárová | 2 | 1
3 | (Spain) C Martínez | 6 | 6

Third round
Q | (Italy) F Schiavone | 7 | 6
(Russia) N Petrova | 5 | 4
(Czech Republic) D Chládková | 0 | 1
3 | (Spain) C Martínez | 6 | 6

Quarterfinals
Q | (Italy) F Schiavone | 2 | 3
3 | (Spain) C Martínez | 6 | 6

==== Section 4 ====
First round
(South Africa) J Kruger | 6 | 6
WC | (Italy) G Casoni | 4 | 1
Q | (Russia) A Myskina | 4 | 4
(Spain) G León García | 6 | 6
(Italy) S Farina Elia | 6 | 1 | 6
12 | (France) S Testud | 1 | 6 | 3
14 | (Federal Republic of Yugoslavia) J Dokic | 6 | 6
Q | (Sweden) Å Carlsson | 3 | 2
(Switzerland) P Schnyder | 4 | 7 | 0
(Italy) T Garbin | 6 | 5 | 0^{r}
(Croatia) I Majoli | 4 | 4
(Hungary) R Kuti-Kis | 6 | 6

Second round
5 | (France) N Tauziat | 7 | 3 | 4
(South Africa) J Kruger | 5 | 6 | 6
(Spain) G León García | 7^{10} | 6
(Italy) S Farina Elia | 6^{8} | 2
14 | (Federal Republic of Yugoslavia) J Dokic | 6 | 3 | 6
(Switzerland) P Schnyder | 2 | 6 | 4
(Hungary) R Kuti-Kis | 1 | 6 | 7^{7}
2 | (United States) J Capriati | 6 | 2 | 6^{5}

Third round
(South Africa) J Kruger | 2 | 6 | 6
(Spain) G León García | 6 | 4 | 4
14 | (Federal Republic of Yugoslavia) J Dokic | 6 | 6
(Hungary) R Kuti-Kis | 3 | 3

Quarterfinals
(South Africa) J Kruger | 2 | 6^{5}
14 | (Federal Republic of Yugoslavia) J Dokic | 6 | 7^{7}
