= 2002 Sarasota Clay Court Classic – Doubles =

Doubles
- 2002 Sarasota Clay Court Classic

Final
- Champions: (Federal Republic of Yugoslavia) Jelena Dokic (Russia) Elena Likhovtseva
- Runners-up: (Belgium) Els Callens (Spain) Conchita Martínez
- Score: 6–7^{(5–7)}, 6–3, 6–3

Details
- Draw: 16 (2WC/1Q/1LL)
- Seeds: 4

Events
Singles	Doubles
Sarasota Clay Court Classic	· 2003 →

In the inaugural edition of the tournament, Jelena Dokic and Elena Likhovtseva won the title by defeating Els Callens and Conchita Martínez 6–7^{(5–7)}, 6–3, 6–3 in the final.

== Seeds ==
1. (Spain) Virginia Ruano Pascual / (Argentina) Paola Suárez (semifinals, withdrew)
2. (Federal Republic of Yugoslavia) Jelena Dokic / (Russia) Elena Likhovtseva (champions)
3. (Belgium) Els Callens / (Spain) Conchita Martínez (final)
4. (United States) Nicole Arendt / (South Africa) Liezel Huber (quarterfinals)

== Draw ==
=== Key ===
- Q = Qualifier
- WC = Wild card
- LL = Lucky loser
- Alt = Alternate
- SE = Special exempt
- PR = Protected ranking
- ITF = ITF entry
- JE = Junior exempt
- w/o = Walkover
- r = Retired
- d = Defaulted
- SR = Special ranking

=== Draw ===
First round
1	(Spain) V Ruano Pascual (Argentina) P Suárez	6	6
LL	(Germany) B Lamade (Australia) A Molik	2	2
(Japan) A Sugiyama (Ukraine) E Tatarkova	6	6
(Slovakia) H Nagyová (Switzerland) P Schnyder	2	3
3	(Belgium) E Callens (Spain) C Martínez	6	6
(Australia) E Dominikovic (Italy) T Garbin	2	1
(Russia) E Dementieva (Slovakia) J Husárová	6	6
(Sweden) Å Svensson (Argentina) P Tarabini	4	1
WC	(Paraguay) R de los Ríos (Spain) A Sánchez Vicario	2	6	6
Q	(Japan) R Hiraki (Japan) N Miyagi	6	2	4
(France) A Fusai (Netherlands) C Vis	2	6	3
4	(United States) N Arendt (South Africa) L Huber	6	4	6
(Chinese Taipei) J Lee (Indonesia) W Prakusya	1	2
(Argentina) L Montalvo (Argentina) ME Salerni	6	6
WC	(Australia) R McQuillan (United States) K Schlukebir	6	6^{5}	3
2	(Federal Republic of Yugoslavia) J Dokic (Russia) E Likhovtseva	2	7^{7}	6

Quarterfinals
1	(Spain) V Ruano Pascual (Argentina) P Suárez	6	6
(Japan) A Sugiyama (Ukraine) E Tatarkova	0	2
3	(Belgium) E Callens (Spain) C Martínez	7	7^{7}
(Russia) E Dementieva (Slovakia) J Husárová	5	6^{1}
WC	(Paraguay) R de los Ríos (Spain) A Sánchez Vicario	6	6
4	(United States) N Arendt (South Africa) L Huber	2	2
(Argentina) L Montalvo (Argentina) ME Salerni	3	6	4
2	(Federal Republic of Yugoslavia) J Dokic (Russia) E Likhovtseva	6	4	6

Semifinals
1	(Spain) V Ruano Pascual (Argentina) P Suárez
3	(Belgium) E Callens (Spain) C Martínez	w/o
WC	(Paraguay) R de los Ríos (Spain) A Sánchez Vicario	3	6	3
2	(Federal Republic of Yugoslavia) J Dokic (Russia) E Likhovtseva	6	4	6

Final
3	(Belgium) E Callens (Spain) C Martínez	7^{7}	3	3
2	(Federal Republic of Yugoslavia) J Dokic (Russia) E Likhovtseva	6^{5}	6	6
