= 2000 Pilot Pen Tennis – Singles =

Singles
- 2000 Pilot Pen Tennis

Final
- Champion: (United States) Venus Williams
- Runner-up: (United States) Monica Seles
- Score: 6–2, 6–4

Details
- Draw: 28
- Seeds: 8

Events
| Singles | Doubles |
- Pilot Pen Tennis

Venus Williams was the defending champion and successfully defended her title by defeating Monica Seles 6–2, 6–4 in the final. Williams did not lose a set in the tournament for the second straight year.

== Seeds ==
The first four seeds received a bye into the second round.

1. (United States) Venus Williams (champion)
2. (United States) Monica Seles (final)
3. (France) Nathalie Tauziat (semifinals)
4. (Germany) Anke Huber (quarterfinals)
5. (South Africa) Amanda Coetzer (semifinals)
6. (Belgium) Dominique van Roost (quarterfinals)
7. (Austria) Barbara Schett (first round)
8. (France) Julie Halard-Decugis (first round)

== Draw ==
Key

- Q = Qualifier
- WC = Wild card
- LL = Lucky loser
- Alt = Alternate
- ITF = ITF entry
- PR = Protected ranking
- SR = Special ranking
- SE = Special exempt
- JE = Junior exempt
- JR = Junior Accelerator Programme entrant
- CO = College Accelerator Programme entrant
- NG = Next Gen Accelerator Program entrant
- w/o = Walkover
- r = Retired
- d = Defaulted

=== Finals ===
Semifinals
1 | (United States) Venus Williams | 6 | 6
5 | (South Africa) Amanda Coetzer | 3 | 4
3 | (France) Nathalie Tauziat | 6 | 2 | 1
2 | (United States) Monica Seles | 2 | 6 | 6

Final
1 | (United States) Venus Williams | 6 | 6
2 | (United States) Monica Seles | 2 | 4

=== Top half ===
First round
Q | (Italy) T Garbin | 1 | 3
(Russia) E Likhovtseva | 6 | 6
(Australia) J Dokic | 4 | 3
(Russia) E Dementieva | 6 | 6
(Switzerland) P Schnyder | 6 | 7^{7}
8 | (France) J Halard-Decugis | 3 | 6^{5}
Q | (Germany) J Kandarr | 4 | 4
(Japan) A Sugiyama | 6 | 6
(Belgium) S Appelmans | 2 | 4
Q | (Belgium) J Henin | 6 | 6
Q | (Slovakia) K Habšudová | 6^{2} | 4
5 | (South Africa) A Coetzer | 7^{7} | 6

Second round
1 | (United States) V Williams | 6 | 7
(Russia) E Likhovtseva | 3 | 5
(Russia) E Dementieva | 6 | 5 | 3
(Switzerland) P Schnyder | 1 | 7 | 6
4 | (Germany) A Huber | 4 | 7 | 6
(Japan) A Sugiyama | 6 | 5 | 2
Q | (Belgium) J Henin | 2 | 6 | 1
5 | (South Africa) A Coetzer | 6 | 4 | 6

Quarterfinals
1 | (United States) V Williams | 6 | 6
(Switzerland) P Schnyder | 4 | 2
4 | (Germany) A Huber | 6^{3} | 1
5 | (South Africa) A Coetzer | 7^{7} | 6

Semifinals
1 | (United States) V Williams | 6 | 6
5 | (South Africa) A Coetzer | 3 | 4

=== Bottom half ===
First round
7 | (Austria) B Schett | 6 | 6^{1} | 2
(Belgium) K Clijsters | 4 | 7^{7} | 6
(Colombia) F Zuluaga | 7 | 6
Q | (United States) M Tu | 5 | 1
WC | (United States) M Shaughnessy | 6 | 6
(Romania) R Dragomir | 4 | 1
6 | (Belgium) D van Roost | 7^{7} | 6
WC | (Bulgaria) M Maleeva | 6^{2} | 4
(Croatia) S Talaja | 6 | 5 | 6
(France) A-G Sidot | 2 | 7 | 2
Q | (Luxembourg) A Kremer | 6^{3} | 1
WC | (United States) K Brandi | 7^{7} | 6

Second round
(Belgium) K Clijsters | 6 | 6
(Colombia) F Zuluaga | 1 | 1
WC | (United States) M Shaughnessy | 1 | 6 | 4
3 | (France) N Tauziat | 6 | 4 | 6
6 | (Belgium) D van Roost | 6 | 7
(Croatia) S Talaja | 3 | 5
WC | (United States) K Brandi | 2 | 3
2 | (United States) M Seles | 6 | 6

Quarterfinals
(Belgium) K Clijsters | 2 | 4
3 | (France) N Tauziat | 6 | 6
6 | (Belgium) D van Roost | 1 | 2
2 | (United States) M Seles | 6 | 6

Semifinals
3 | (France) N Tauziat | 6 | 2 | 1
2 | (United States) M Seles | 2 | 6 | 6
