= 2000 Italian Open – Men's singles =

Men's singles
- 2000 Italian Open

Final
- Champion: (Sweden) Magnus Norman
- Runner-up: (Brazil) Gustavo Kuerten
- Score: 6–3, 4–6, 6–4, 6–4

Details
- Draw: 64
- Seeds: 16

Events
Singles	men	women
Doubles	men	women
- Italian Open

Magnus Norman defeated the defending champion Gustavo Kuerten in the final, 6–3, 4–6, 6–4, 6–4 to win the men's singles tennis title at the 2000 Italian Open.

== Seeds ==
1. (United States) Andre Agassi (third round)
2. (Russia) Yevgeny Kafelnikov (second round)
3. (Sweden) Magnus Norman (champion)
4. (Brazil) Gustavo Kuerten (final)
5. (France) Cédric Pioline (second round)
6. (Ecuador) Nicolás Lapentti (second round)
7. (Sweden) Thomas Enqvist (third round)
8. (United Kingdom) Tim Henman (second round)
9. (Australia) Lleyton Hewitt (semifinals)
10. (Spain) Álex Corretja (semifinals)
11. (Chile) Marcelo Ríos (first round)
12. (Australia) Patrick Rafter (first round)
13. (United Kingdom) Greg Rusedski (first round)
14. (Morocco) Younes El Aynaoui (third round)
15. (Slovakia) Dominik Hrbatý (quarterfinals)
16. (Spain) Juan Carlos Ferrero (third round)

== Draw ==
Key

- Q = Qualifier
- WC = Wild card
- LL = Lucky loser
- Alt = Alternate
- ITF = ITF entry
- PR = Protected ranking
- SR = Special ranking
- SE = Special exempt
- JE = Junior exempt
- JR = Junior Accelerator Programme entrant
- CO = College Accelerator Programme entrant
- NG = Next Gen Accelerator Program entrant
- w/o = Walkover
- r = Retired
- d = Defaulted

=== Finals ===
Semifinals
10	(Spain) Álex Corretja	4	2
4	(Brazil) Gustavo Kuerten	6	6
3	(Sweden) Magnus Norman	6	6
9	(Australia) Lleyton Hewitt	3	0

Final
4	(Brazil) Gustavo Kuerten	3	6	4	4
3	(Sweden) Magnus Norman	6	4	6	6

=== Top half ===
==== Section 1 ====
First round
1	(United States) A Agassi	6	7^{7}
(United States) T Martin	2	6^{4}
Q	(Argentina) G Gaudio	6	7
(Brazil) F Meligeni	1	5
(Czech Republic) S Doseděl	6	3	4
(Argentina) F Squillari	2	6	6
Q	(United States) J Tarango	4	1
15	(Slovakia) D Hrbatý	6	6
10	(Spain) Á Corretja	6	4	7^{7}
(Slovakia) K Kučera	2	6	6^{5}
(Germany) T Haas	6^{5}	6^{2}
(Czech Republic) J Novák	7^{7}	7^{7}
WC	(Italy) L Tieleman	5	3
(France) F Santoro	7	6
(Zimbabwe) B Black	6^{5}	4
8	(United Kingdom) T Henman	7^{7}	6

Second round
1	(United States) A Agassi	6	6
Q	(Argentina) G Gaudio	1	4
(Argentina) F Squillari	4	6^{3}
15	(Slovakia) D Hrbatý	6	7^{7}
10	(Spain) Á Corretja	6	7^{7}
(Czech Republic) J Novák	3	6^{4}
(France) F Santoro	7^{7}	4	6
8	(United Kingdom) T Henman	6^{5}	6	4

Third round
1	(United States) A Agassi	4	4
15	(Slovakia) D Hrbatý	6	6
10	(Spain) Á Corretja	6	6
(France) F Santoro	2	3

Quarterfinals
15	(Slovakia) D Hrbatý	1	6^{5}
10	(Spain) Á Corretja	6	7^{7}

==== Section 2 ====
First round
4	(Brazil) G Kuerten	6	6
(France) J Golmard	4	1
(Australia) M Philippoussis	6	1	7^{7}
(Switzerland) M Rosset	3	6	6^{2}
(Netherlands) R Krajicek	4	4
(Argentina) M Zabaleta	6	6
(United States) V Spadea	2	3
14	(Morocco) Y El Aynaoui	6	6
12	(Australia) P Rafter	6	4	3
Q	(Czech Republic) B Ulihrach	3	6	6
Q	(Spain) A Portas	2	3
(Spain) Á Costa	6	6
Q	(Croatia) G Ivanišević	4	6	5
(Spain) F Clavet	6	3	7
(Sweden) T Johansson	4	5
6	(Ecuador) N Lapentti	6	7

Second round
4	(Brazil) G Kuerten	6	6
(Australia) M Philippoussis	2	2
(Argentina) M Zabaleta	6	6^{2}	6^{6}
14	(Morocco) Y El Aynaoui	3	7^{7}	7^{8}
Q	(Czech Republic) B Ulihrach	1	2
(Spain) Á Costa	6	6
(Spain) F Clavet	7	6
6	(Ecuador) N Lapentti	5	4

Third round
4	(Brazil) G Kuerten	w/o
14	(Morocco) Y El Aynaoui
(Spain) Á Costa	6	6
(Spain) F Clavet	3	2

Quarterfinals
4	(Brazil) G Kuerten	6	7
(Spain) Á Costa	4	5

=== Bottom half ===
==== Section 3 ====
First round
5	(France) C Pioline	6	6
(United States) C Woodruff	1	1
(France) N Escudé	1	6	3
Q	(Romania) A Pavel	6	4	6
Q	(Argentina) J I Chela	3	3
(Spain) F Mantilla	6	6
(Russia) M Safin	6	6
11	(Chile) M Ríos	1	4
13	(United Kingdom) G Rusedski	3	1
(Spain) F Vicente	6	6
(Ukraine) A Medvedev	3	6	7
(Switzerland) R Federer	6	3	5
Q	(Norway) C Ruud	3	1
(Spain) C Moyà	6	6
(France) S Grosjean	3	6^{2}
3	(Sweden) M Norman	6	7^{7}

Second round
5	(France) C Pioline	6	1	6^{5}
Q	(Romania) A Pavel	3	6	7^{7}
(Spain) F Mantilla	7	6^{5}	6
(Russia) M Safin	5	7^{7}	3
(Spain) F Vicente	2	5
(Ukraine) A Medvedev	6	7
(Spain) C Moyà	4	2
3	(Sweden) M Norman	6	6

Third round
Q	(Romania) A Pavel	4	2
(Spain) F Mantilla	6	6
(Ukraine) A Medvedev	6^{4}	1
3	(Sweden) M Norman	7^{7}	6

Quarterfinals
(Spain) F Mantilla	4	3
3	(Sweden) M Norman	6	6

==== Section 4 ====
First round
7	(Sweden) T Enqvist	6	6
(Czech Republic) D Vacek	1	2
(South Africa) W Ferreira	6	2	6^{5}
(United States) M Chang	4	6	7^{7}
(France) A di Pasquale	6	6
(Morocco) K Alami	3	2
(Austria) S Koubek	4	2
9	(Australia) L Hewitt	6	6
16	(Spain) J C Ferrero	6	6^{5}	7
WC	(Italy) D Sanguinetti	4	7^{7}	5
(Morocco) H Arazi	6	6
(Netherlands) S Schalken	3	2
(Argentina) M Puerta	6	6
WC	(Italy) R Furlan	2	3
WC	(Italy) A Gaudenzi	3	6	5
2	(Russia) Y Kafelnikov	6	2	7

Second round
7	(Sweden) T Enqvist	2	6	6
(United States) M Chang	6	4	2
(France) A di Pasquale	3	7^{8}	4
9	(Australia) L Hewitt	6	6^{6}	6
16	(Spain) J C Ferrero	7^{7}	6
(Morocco) H Arazi	6^{3}	3
(Argentina) M Puerta	6	6
2	(Russia) Y Kafelnikov	4	4

Third round
7	(Sweden) T Enqvist	6^{6}	6	3
9	(Australia) L Hewitt	7^{8}	2	6
16	(Spain) J C Ferrero	6^{5}	6	4
(Argentina) M Puerta	7^{7}	3	6

Quarterfinals
9	(Australia) L Hewitt	6	3	6
(Argentina) M Puerta	3	6	1
