= 2000 Italian Open – Women's singles =

Women's singles
- 2000 Italian Open

Final
- Champion: (United States) Monica Seles
- Runner-up: (France) Amélie Mauresmo
- Score: 6–2, 7–6^{(7–4)}

Details
- Draw: 56
- Seeds: 16

Events
Singles	men	women
Doubles	men	women
← 1999 ·	Italian Open	· 2001 →

Monica Seles defeated Amélie Mauresmo in the final, 6–2, 7–6^{(7–4)} to win the women's singles tennis title at the 2000 Italian Open. It was her third title of the year, and the 47th of her career.

Venus Williams was the defending champion, but lost in the third round to Jelena Dokic.

== Seeds ==
The first eight seeds received a bye into the second round.

1. (United States) Lindsay Davenport (third round, withdrew)
2. (France) Nathalie Tauziat (quarterfinals)
3. (United States) Venus Williams (third round)
4. (France) Mary Pierce (third round)
5. (United States) Monica Seles (champion)
6. (Spain) Arantxa Sánchez Vicario (quarterfinals)
7. (France) Julie Halard-Decugis (second round)
8. (France) Sandrine Testud (second round)
9. (Germany) Anke Huber (second round)
10. (United States) Jennifer Capriati (first round)
11. (Russia) Elena Likhovtseva (first round)
12. (France) Amélie Mauresmo (final)
13. (Japan) Ai Sugiyama (second round)
14. (France) Nathalie Dechy (first round)
15. (Belgium) Dominique van Roost (second round)
16. (Croatia) Silvija Talaja (first round)

== Draw ==
=== Key ===
- Q = Qualifier
- WC = Wild card
- LL = Lucky loser
- Alt = Alternate
- ITF = ITF entry
- PR = Protected ranking
- SR = Special ranking
- SE = Special exempt
- JE = Junior exempt
- JR = Junior Accelerator Programme entrant
- CO = College Accelerator Programme entrant
- NG = Next Gen Accelerator Program entrant
- w/o = Walkover
- r = Retired
- d = Defaulted

=== Finals ===
Quarterfinals
WC	(Italy) Giulia Casoni	6	4	5
(United States) Corina Morariu	3	6	7
(Australia) Jelena Dokic	1	6	3
5	(United States) Monica Seles	6	3	6
6	(Spain) Arantxa Sánchez Vicario	1	7	4
12	(France) Amélie Mauresmo	6	5	6
Q	(Colombia) Fabiola Zuluaga	3	6	6
2	(France) Nathalie Tauziat	6	0	4

Semifinals
(United States) Corina Morariu	3	1
5	(United States) Monica Seles	6	6
12	(France) Amélie Mauresmo	6	6
Q	(Colombia) Fabiola Zuluaga	1	2

Final
5	(United States) Monica Seles	6	7^{7}
12	(France) Amélie Mauresmo	2	6^{4}

=== Top half ===
==== Section 1 ====
First round
(Russia) E Dementieva	7^{7}	6
Q	(United States) L Osterloh	6^{2}	1
WC	(Italy) G Casoni	3	7	6
Q	(Canada) M Drake	6	5	4
(Romania) I Spîrlea	2	3
15	(Belgium) D van Roost	6	6
11	(Russia) E Likhovtseva	2	1
(United States) K Brandi	6	6
(Italy) R Grande	6	6
(Croatia) M Lučić	4	0
(United States) C Morariu	6	3	7
Q	(Romania) C Cristea	3	6	5

Second round
1	(United States) L Davenport	6	6
(Russia) E Dementieva	3	2
WC	(Italy) G Casoni	7^{8}	6
15	(Belgium) D van Roost	6^{6}	0
(United States) K Brandi	4	5
(Italy) R Grande	6	7
(United States) C Morariu	7	4	6
8	(France) S Testud	5	6	3

Third round
1	(United States) L Davenport
WC	(Italy) G Casoni	w/o
(Italy) R Grande	1	4
(United States) C Morariu	6	6

Quarterfinals
WC	(Italy) G Casoni	6	4	5
(United States) C Morariu	3	6	7

==== Section 2 ====
First round
(Spain) M Serna	0	2
(United States) C Rubin	6	6
(Russia) T Panova	6	6
(United States) A Stevenson	0	2
(Australia) J Dokic	6	4	6
14	(France) N Dechy	1	6	3
10	(United States) J Capriati	3	5
(France) A-G Sidot	6	7
(Italy) S Farina	2	4
(United States) L Raymond	6	6
(Bulgaria) M Maleeva	6	6
(France) S Pitkowski	4	4

Second round
3	(United States) V Williams	6	6
(United States) C Rubin	1	2
(Russia) T Panova	3	1
(Australia) J Dokic	6	6
(France) A-G Sidot	6	3	6
(United States) L Raymond	4	6	3
(Bulgaria) M Maleeva	5	1
5	(United States) M Seles	7	6

Third round
3	(United States) V Williams	1	2
(Australia) J Dokic	6	6
(France) A-G Sidot	6	1	1
5	(United States) M Seles	3	6	6

Quarterfinals
(Australia) J Dokic	1	6	3
5	(United States) M Seles	6	3	6

=== Bottom half ===
==== Section 3 ====
First round
WC	(Italy) F Schiavone	5	6	2
Q	(Bulgaria) P Nola	7	3	6
(Switzerland) P Schnyder	4	6	4
(Czech Republic) D Chládková	6	4	6
(South Africa) J Kruger	2	3
13	(Japan) A Sugiyama	6	6
12	(France) A Mauresmo	6	6
(Spain) G León García	1	3
(Czech Republic) K Hrdličková	6	6
LL	(Slovenia) T Pisnik	2	2
Q	(Russia) L Krasnoroutskaya	2	6	1
LL	(Germany) M Weingärtner	6	2	6

Second round
6	(Spain) A Sánchez Vicario	6	6
Q	(Bulgaria) P Nola	3	1
(Czech Republic) D Chládková	4	6	7^{7}
13	(Japan) A Sugiyama	6	3	6^{4}
12	(France) A Mauresmo	6	6
(Czech Republic) K Hrdličková	0	2
LL	(Germany) M Weingärtner	5	3
4	(France) M Pierce	7	6

Third round
6	(Spain) A Sánchez Vicario	6	6
(Czech Republic) D Chládková	1	4
12	(France) A Mauresmo	6	6
4	(France) M Pierce	3	4

Quarterfinals
6	(Spain) A Sánchez Vicario	1	7	4
12	(France) A Mauresmo	6	5	6

==== Section 4 ====
First round
(Zimbabwe) C Black	6	3	1
(Romania) R Dragomir	1	6	6
Q	(Czech Republic) E Martincová	6	6
Q	(France) A Fusai	2	3
Q	(Colombia) F Zuluaga	6	6
16	(Croatia) S Talaja	2	3
9	(Germany) A Huber	6	7
(Belarus) N Zvereva	4	5
(Switzerland) E Gagliardi	6	2	6^{1}
(Poland) M Grzybowska	4	6	7^{7}
(Australia) N Pratt	6^{4}	1
WC	(Italy) T Garbin	7^{7}	6

Second round
7	(France) J Halard-Decugis	6	6
(Romania) R Dragomir	4	0
Q	(Czech Republic) E Martincová	0	7^{7}	3
Q	(Colombia) F Zuluaga	6	6^{2}	6
9	(Germany) A Huber	4	1
(Poland) M Grzybowska	6	6
WC	(Italy) T Garbin	7	2	4
2	(France) N Tauziat	5	6	6

Third round
7	(France) J Halard-Decugis	3	6	2
Q	(Colombia) F Zuluaga	6	4	6
(Poland) M Grzybowska	3	6	6^{4}
2	(France) N Tauziat	6	4	7^{7}

Quarterfinals
Q	(Colombia) F Zuluaga	3	6	6
2	(France) N Tauziat	6	0	4
