= 2002 Sarasota Clay Court Classic – Singles =

Singles
- 2002 Sarasota Clay Court Classic

Final
- Champion: (Federal Republic of Yugoslavia) Jelena Dokic
- Runner-up: (Russia) Tatiana Panova
- Score: 6–2, 6–2

Details
- Draw: 32 (2WC/4Q/2LL)
- Seeds: 10

Events
Singles	Doubles
Sarasota Clay Court Classic	· 2003 →

In the inaugural edition of the tournament, Jelena Dokic won the title by defeating Tatiana Panova 6–2, 6–2 in the final.

== Seeds ==
1. (Federal Republic of Yugoslavia) Jelena Dokic (champion)
2. (United States) Meghann Shaughnessy (semifinals)
3. (Spain) Arantxa Sánchez Vicario (first round)
4. (Thailand) Tamarine Tanasugarn (first round)
5. (Uzbekistan) ~~Iroda Tulyaganova~~ (withdrew)
6. (Czech Republic) Dája Bedáňová (second round, withdrew)
7. (Japan) Ai Sugiyama (first round)
8. (Luxembourg) ~~Anne Kremer~~ (withdrew)
9. (Slovakia) Henrieta Nagyová (second round)
10. (Russia) Tatiana Panova (final)

== Draw ==
=== Key ===
- Q = Qualifier
- WC = Wild card
- LL = Lucky loser
- Alt = Alternate
- SE = Special exempt
- PR = Protected ranking
- ITF = ITF entry
- JE = Junior exempt
- w/o = Walkover
- r = Retired
- d = Defaulted
- SR = Special ranking

=== Finals ===
Semifinals
1	(Federal Republic of Yugoslavia) Jelena Dokic	6	0
LL	(France) Virginie Razzano	3	1^{r}
10	(Russia) Tatiana Panova	7^{11}	6
2	(United States) Meghann Shaughnessy	6^{9}	4

Final
1	(Federal Republic of Yugoslavia) Jelena Dokic	6	6
10	(Russia) Tatiana Panova	2	2

=== Top half ===
First round
1	(Federal Republic of Yugoslavia) J Dokic	6	7
(Spain) C Martínez	2	5
(Russia) E Likhovtseva	2	2
Q	(Israel) A Smashnova	6	6
(Switzerland) P Schnyder	6	6
(United States) L Osterloh	0	1
(Belgium) E Callens	5	4
9	(Slovakia) H Nagyová	7	6
4	(Thailand) T Tanasugarn	1	3
(Spain) V Ruano Pascual	6	6
LL	(France) V Razzano	6	6
(France) N Dechy	3	4
(Argentina) P Suárez	6	6
LL	(United States) M Irvin	2	0
(Colombia) F Zuluaga	4	6	2
6	(Czech Republic) D Bedáňová	6	2	6

Second round
1	(Federal Republic of Yugoslavia) J Dokic	6	6
Q	(Israel) A Smashnova	1	0
(Switzerland) P Schnyder	6	3	6
9	(Slovakia) H Nagyová	2	6	2
(Spain) V Ruano Pascual	3	7	2
LL	(France) V Razzano	6	5	6
(Argentina) P Suárez	w/o
6	(Czech Republic) D Bedáňová

Quarterfinals
1	(Federal Republic of Yugoslavia) J Dokic	6	7
(Switzerland) P Schnyder	1	5
LL	(France) V Razzano	6	4	6
(Argentina) P Suárez	2	6	4

Semifinals
1	(Federal Republic of Yugoslavia) J Dokic	6	0
LL	(France) V Razzano	3	1^{r}

=== Bottom half ===
First round
10	(Russia) T Panova	6	3	6
Q	(United States) J Craybas	1	6	2
(Spain) G León García	6	6^{2}	6
(Croatia) I Majoli	3	7^{7}	4
(Australia) A Molik	6	6
Q	(United States) M Washington	4	4
(Slovakia) J Husárová	6	6
3	(Spain) A Sánchez Vicario	4	1
7	(Japan) A Sugiyama	3	3
WC	(France) M Pierce	6	6
(Russia) A Myskina	7^{7}	6
Q	(Russia) A Jidkova	6^{5}	2
(Germany) M Weingärtner	6	6
(Paraguay) R de los Ríos	3	2
WC	(United States) J Hopkins	6	5	5
2	(United States) M Shaughnessy	3	7	7

Second round
10	(Russia) T Panova	6	6
(Spain) G León García	4	2
(Australia) A Molik	6	0	2
(Slovakia) J Husárová	3	6	6
WC	(France) M Pierce	4	6	6^{4}
(Russia) A Myskina	6	3	7^{7}
(Germany) M Weingärtner	2	3
2	(United States) M Shaughnessy	6	6

Quarterfinals
10	(Russia) T Panova	6	4	6
(Slovakia) J Husárová	4	6	1
(Russia) A Myskina	6	6^{6}	4
2	(United States) M Shaughnessy	3	7^{8}	6

Semifinals
10	(Russia) T Panova	7^{11}	6
2	(United States) M Shaughnessy	6^{9}	4
