= 2000 Italian Open – Men's doubles =

Men's doubles
- 2000 Italian Open

Final
- Champions: (Czech Republic) Martin Damm (Slovakia) Dominik Hrbatý
- Runners-up: (South Africa) Wayne Ferreira (Russia) Yevgeny Kafelnikov
- Score: 6–4, 3–6, 6–4

Events
Singles	men	women
Doubles	men	women
- Italian Open

Ellis Ferreira and Rick Leach were the defending champions, but lost in second round to Simon Aspelin and Jaime Oncins

Martin Damm and Dominik Hrbatý won the title by defeating Wayne Ferreira and Yevgeny Kafelnikov 6–4, 3–6, 6–4 in the final. It was the 17th title for Damm and the 1st title for Hrbatý in their respective doubles careers.

== Seeds ==
1. (United States) Alex O'Brien / (United States) Jared Palmer (quarterfinals)
2. (South Africa) Ellis Ferreira / (United States) Rick Leach (second round)
3. (Netherlands) Paul Haarhuis / (Australia) Sandon Stolle (quarterfinals)
4. (Sweden) Jonas Björkman / (Zimbabwe) Byron Black (quarterfinals)
5. (South Africa) David Adams / (South Africa) John-Laffnie de Jager (first round)
6. (South Africa) Wayne Ferreira / (Russia) Yevgeny Kafelnikov (final)
7. (Czech Republic) Jiří Novák / (Czech Republic) David Rikl (first round)
8. (India) Mahesh Bhupathi / (The Bahamas) Mark Knowles (first round)

== Draw ==
Key

- Q = Qualifier
- WC = Wild card
- LL = Lucky loser
- Alt = Alternate
- ITF = ITF entry
- PR = Protected ranking
- SR = Special ranking
- SE = Special exempt
- JE = Junior exempt
- JR = Junior Accelerator Programme entrant
- CO = College Accelerator Programme entrant
- NG = Next Gen Accelerator Program entrant
- w/o = Walkover
- r = Retired
- d = Defaulted

=== Finals ===
Semifinals
(Czech Republic) Martin Damm (Slovakia) Dominik Hrbatý	3	7	6
WC	(Ecuador) Nicolás Lapentti (Chile) Marcelo Ríos	6	5	3
6	(South Africa) Wayne Ferreira (Russia) Yevgeny Kafelnikov	7^{8}	6
WC	(Italy) Massimo Bertolini (Italy) Cristian Brandi	6^{6}	3

Final
(Czech Republic) Martin Damm (Slovakia) Dominik Hrbatý	6	4	6
6	(South Africa) Wayne Ferreira (Russia) Yevgeny Kafelnikov	4	6	3

=== Top half ===
First round
1	(United States) A O'Brien (United States) J Palmer	1	7^{7}	6
(United States) J-M Gambill (United States) S Humphries	6	6^{3}	2
(North Macedonia) A Kitinov (Czech Republic) D Vacek	2	5
(South Africa) P Norval (Argentina) D Orsanic	6	7
(Argentina) L Arnold Ker (Argentina) M García	6	5	2
Q	(Sweden) T Johansson (Sweden) M Norman	4	7	6
(Czech Republic) M Damm (Slovakia) D Hrbatý	7^{7}	7
8	(India) M Bhupathi (The Bahamas) M Knowles	6^{2}	5
3	(Netherlands) P Haarhuis (Australia) S Stolle	6	2	6
(South Africa) R Koenig (Russia) A Olhovskiy	3	6	4
(Sweden) N Kulti (Sweden) M Tillström	6	6
(United States) P Galbraith (United States) B MacPhie	2	4
(Spain) T Carbonell (United States) D Johnson	6	7^{7}
(Sweden) P Nyborg (Belgium) T Vanhoudt	4	6^{3}
WC	(Ecuador) N Lapentti (Chile) M Ríos	6	6
5	(South Africa) D Adams (South Africa) J-L de Jager	4	4

Second round
1	(United States) A O'Brien (United States) J Palmer	7	6
(South Africa) P Norval (Argentina) D Orsanic	5	2
Q	(Sweden) T Johansson (Sweden) M Norman	4	3
(Czech Republic) M Damm (Slovakia) D Hrbatý	6	6
3	(Netherlands) P Haarhuis (Australia) S Stolle	4	7	6
(Sweden) N Kulti (Sweden) M Tillström	6	5	1
(Spain) T Carbonell (United States) D Johnson	6^{3}	7^{7}	4
WC	(Ecuador) N Lapentti (Chile) M Ríos	7^{7}	6^{4}	6

Quarterfinals
1	(United States) A O'Brien (United States) J Palmer	4	2
(Czech Republic) M Damm (Slovakia) D Hrbatý	6	6
3	(Netherlands) P Haarhuis (Australia) S Stolle	4	0
WC	(Ecuador) N Lapentti (Chile) M Ríos	6	6

Semifinals
(Czech Republic) M Damm (Slovakia) D Hrbatý	3	7	6
WC	(Ecuador) N Lapentti (Chile) M Ríos	6	5	3

=== Bottom half ===
First round
6	(South Africa) W Ferreira (Russia) Y Kafelnikov	6	6
(France) O Delaître (France) F Santoro	4	4
(Australia) J Eagle (Australia) A Florent	6	7^{7}
(Zimbabwe) W Black (Australia) A Kratzmann	3	6^{5}
WC	(Australia) L Hewitt (Australia) M Woodforde	7^{7}	7^{7}
WC	(Italy) S Pescosolido (Italy) V Santopadre	6^{3}	6^{4}
(Croatia) G Ivanišević (United States) J Tarango	4	6^{2}
4	(Sweden) J Björkman (Zimbabwe) B Black	6	7^{7}
7	(Czech Republic) J Novák (Czech Republic) D Rikl	3	6	2
WC	(Italy) M Bertolini (Italy) C Brandi	6	3	6
(Belarus) M Mirnyi (Canada) D Nestor	1	3
WC	(Italy) A Gaudenzi (Italy) D Nargiso	6	6
(Sweden) S Aspelin (Brazil) J Oncins	6	6
Q	(France) A Clément (France) S Grosjean	4	1
(Brazil) G Kuerten (Brazil) A Prieto	6^{7}	5
2	(South Africa) E Ferreira (United States) R Leach	7^{9}	7

Second round
6	(South Africa) W Ferreira (Russia) Y Kafelnikov	6	6
(Australia) J Eagle (Australia) A Florent	4	3
WC	(Australia) L Hewitt (Australia) M Woodforde	3	7^{7}	3
4	(Sweden) J Björkman (Zimbabwe) B Black	6	6^{2}	6
WC	(Italy) M Bertolini (Italy) C Brandi	7	7
WC	(Italy) A Gaudenzi (Italy) D Nargiso	5	5
(Sweden) S Aspelin (Brazil) J Oncins	7	6
2	(South Africa) E Ferreira (United States) R Leach	5	4

Quarterfinals
6	(South Africa) W Ferreira (Russia) Y Kafelnikov	6	6
4	(Sweden) J Björkman (Zimbabwe) B Black	2	4
WC	(Italy) M Bertolini (Italy) C Brandi	7^{7}	7^{7}
(Sweden) S Aspelin (Brazil) J Oncins	6^{2}	6^{5}

Semifinals
6	(South Africa) W Ferreira (Russia) Y Kafelnikov	7^{8}	6
WC	(Italy) M Bertolini (Italy) C Brandi	6^{6}	3
