= 2011 Malaysian Open – Singles =

Singles
- 2011 Malaysian Open

Final
- Champion: (Australia) Jelena Dokić
- Runner-up: (Czech Republic) Lucie Šafářová
- Score: 2–6, 7–6^{(11–9)}, 6–4

Details
- Draw: 32
- Seeds: 8

Events
Singles	Doubles
- Malaysian Open

Alisa Kleybanova was the defending champion, but she lost to Michaëlla Krajicek in the second round.

Jelena Dokić claimed the title, defeating fifth seed Lucie Šafářová 2–6, 7–6^{(11–9)}, 6–4 in the final. Dokić won her first title in nine years, sixth & the last title in her career.

== Seeds ==
1. (Italy) Francesca Schiavone (first round)
2. (France) Marion Bartoli (quarterfinals)
3. (Russia) Alisa Kleybanova (second round)
4. (Australia) Jarmila Groth (semifinals)
5. (Czech Republic) Lucie Šafářová (final)
6. (Japan) Ayumi Morita (quarterfinals)
7. (Japan) Kimiko Date-Krumm (first round)
8. (Serbia) Bojana Jovanovski (quarterfinals)

== Draw ==
Key

- Q = Qualifier
- WC = Wild card
- LL = Lucky loser
- Alt = Alternate
- ITF = ITF entry
- PR = Protected ranking
- SR = Special ranking
- SE = Special exempt
- JE = Junior exempt
- JR = Junior Accelerator Programme entrant
- CO = College Accelerator Programme entrant
- NG = Next Gen Accelerator Program entrant
- w/o = Walkover
- r = Retired
- d = Defaulted

=== Finals ===
Semifinals
(Australia) Jelena Dokić	6	6
(Netherlands) Michaëlla Krajicek	2	3
4/WC	(Australia) Jarmila Groth	2	6	3
5	(Czech Republic) Lucie Šafářová	6	3	6

Final
(Australia) Jelena Dokić	2	7^{11}	6
5	(Czech Republic) Lucie Šafářová	6	6^{9}	4

=== Top half ===
First round
1/WC	(Italy) F Schiavone	6	6^{1}	4
(Australia) J Dokić	2	7^{7}	6
(Japan) K Nara	6	6
(Russia) E Bovina	3	3
(Japan) J Namigata	1	3
WC	(Poland) U Radwańska	6	6
(Thailand) T Tanasugarn	0	1
8	(Serbia) B Jovanovski	6	6
3	(Russia) A Kleybanova	6	6
Q	(China) J Lu	1	1
(Germany) T Malek	3	2
(Netherlands) M Krajicek	6	6
(Italy) A Brianti	4	6	2
(Thailand) N Lertcheewakarn	6	2	6
Q	(Luxembourg) A Kremer	4	6	7^{7}
7	(Japan) K Date-Krumm	6	2	6^{5}

Second round
(Australia) J Dokić	3	7^{8}	6
(Japan) K Nara	6	6^{6}	2
WC	(Poland) U Radwańska	6	5	4
8	(Serbia) B Jovanovski	1	7	6
3	(Russia) A Kleybanova	6	4	3
(Netherlands) M Krajicek	3	6	6
(Thailand) N Lertcheewakarn	6^{4}	3
Q	(Luxembourg) A Kremer	7^{7}	6

Quarterfinals
(Australia) J Dokić	7^{7}	6
8	(Serbia) B Jovanovski	6^{4}	2
(Netherlands) M Krajicek	6	6
Q	(Luxembourg) A Kremer	2	3

Semifinals
(Australia) J Dokić	6	6
(Netherlands) M Krajicek	2	3

=== Bottom half ===
First round
6	(Japan) A Morita	6	6
(Belarus) D Kustova	2	0
(Chinese Taipei) K-c Chang	4	7^{7}	4
(China) S Zhang	6	6^{3}	6
Q	(Ukraine) T Luzhanska	2	3
(Japan) M Doi	6	6
Q	(China) S Sun	6^{2}	3
4/WC	(Australia) J Groth	7^{7}	6
5	(Czech Republic) L Šafářová	7	6
(Kazakhstan) Z Diyas	5	1
(China) X Han	2	0
(Russia) D Safina	6	6
(Russia) N Bratchikova	3	6	4
(Russia) E Ivanova	6	4	6
(Italy) ME Camerin	0	1
2	(France) M Bartoli	6	6

Second round
6	(Japan) A Morita	6	6
(China) S Zhang	0	4
(Japan) M Doi	6^{6}	3
4/WC	(Australia) J Groth	7^{8}	6
5	(Czech Republic) L Šafářová	6	4	6
(Russia) D Safina	3	6	3
(Russia) E Ivanova	2	1
2	(France) M Bartoli	6	6

Quarterfinals
6	(Japan) A Morita	5	6	5
4/WC	(Australia) J Groth	7	3	7
5	(Czech Republic) L Šafářová	6	6
2	(France) M Bartoli	1	4

Semifinals
4/WC	(Australia) J Groth	2	6	3
5	(Czech Republic) L Šafářová	6	3	6
