= Sarasota Clay Court Classic =

Defunct tennis tournament
- Founded: 2002
- Abolished: 2003
- Editions: 2
- Location: Sarasota; United States
- Category: Tier IV
- Surface: Green Clay / outdoors
- Draw: 32M/32Q/16D
- Prize money: $140,000

The Sarasota Clay Court Classic was a tennis tournament held in Sarasota, Florida, United States. Held in 2002 and 2003, this WTA Tour event was a Tier IV-tournament and was played on outdoor green clay courts.

== Past finals ==
=== Singles ===
Year	Champions	Runners-up	Score
2002	(Federal Republic of Yugoslavia) Jelena Dokić	(Russia) Tatiana Panova	6–2, 6–2
2003	(Russia) Anastasia Myskina	(Australia) Alicia Molik	6–4, 6–1

=== Doubles ===
Year	Champions	Runners-up	Score
2002	(Federal Republic of Yugoslavia) Jelena Dokić (Russia) Elena Likhovtseva	(Belgium) Els Callens (Spain) Conchita Martínez	6–7^{(5–7)}, 6–3, 6–3
2003	(South Africa) Liezel Huber (United States) Martina Navratilova	(Japan) Shinobu Asagoe (Japan) Nana Miyagi	7–6^{(10–8)}, 6–3

== See also ==
- List of tennis tournaments
