= 2001 WTA Tour =

Women's tennis circuit

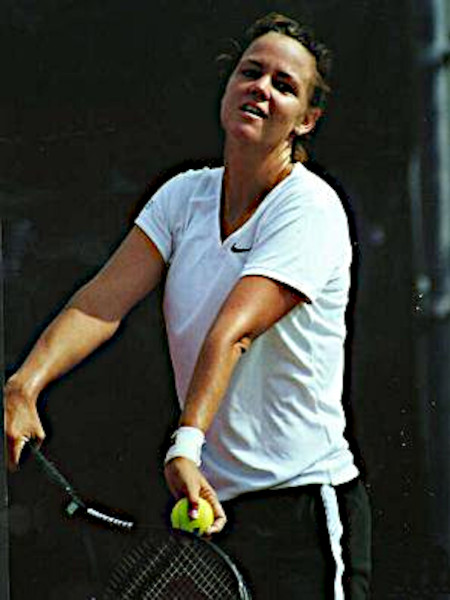
- Lindsay Davenport finished the year as WTA world No. 1 for the second time in her career, though Jennifer Capriati was named the Player of the Year. Davenport won seven tournaments during the season, including two Tier I events. Capriati won three tournaments during the season, including two majors at the Australian Open and the French Open, as well as a Tier I event.

Details
- Duration: December 30, 2000 – November 11, 2001
- Edition: 31st
- Tournaments: 63
- Categories: Grand Slam (4); WTA Championships; WTA Tier I (9); WTA Tier II (17); WTA Tier III (17); WTA Tier IV (7); WTA Tier V (8)

Achievements (singles)
- Most titles: (United States) Lindsay Davenport (7)
- Most finals: (United States) Lindsay Davenport (11)
- Prize money leader: (United States) Venus Williams (US$2,662,610)
- Points leader: (United States) Lindsay Davenport (4,902)

Awards
- Player of the year: (United States) Jennifer Capriati
- Doubles team of the year: (United States) Lisa Raymond (Australia) Rennae Stubbs
- Most improved player of the year: (Belgium) Justine Henin
- Newcomer of the year: (Slovakia) Daniela Hantuchová
- Comeback player of the year: (Austria) Barbara Schwartz

The WTA Tour is the elite tour for professional women's tennis organised by the Women's Tennis Association (WTA). The WTA Tour includes the four Grand Slam tournaments, the WTA Tour Championships and the WTA Tier I, Tier II, Tier III, Tier IV and Tier V events. ITF tournaments are not part of the WTA Tour, although they award points for the WTA World Ranking.

== Season summary ==
=== Singles ===
The year-end number one in 2000 and thus the No. 1 player as 2001 begun, Martina Hingis started the new season off well by winning the title at the Adidas International over nemesis Lindsay Davenport. The two looked like they might meet again in the Australian Open final: Hingis beat Venus Williams in her semifinal, but Davenport was then surprised by a resurgent Jennifer Capriati, who was enjoying a dream run to her first Grand Slam final. Going against the odds, Capriati also scalped Hingis to win her first ever Slam title and re-entered the top 10 in the rankings after a near-eight year absence, a record gap.

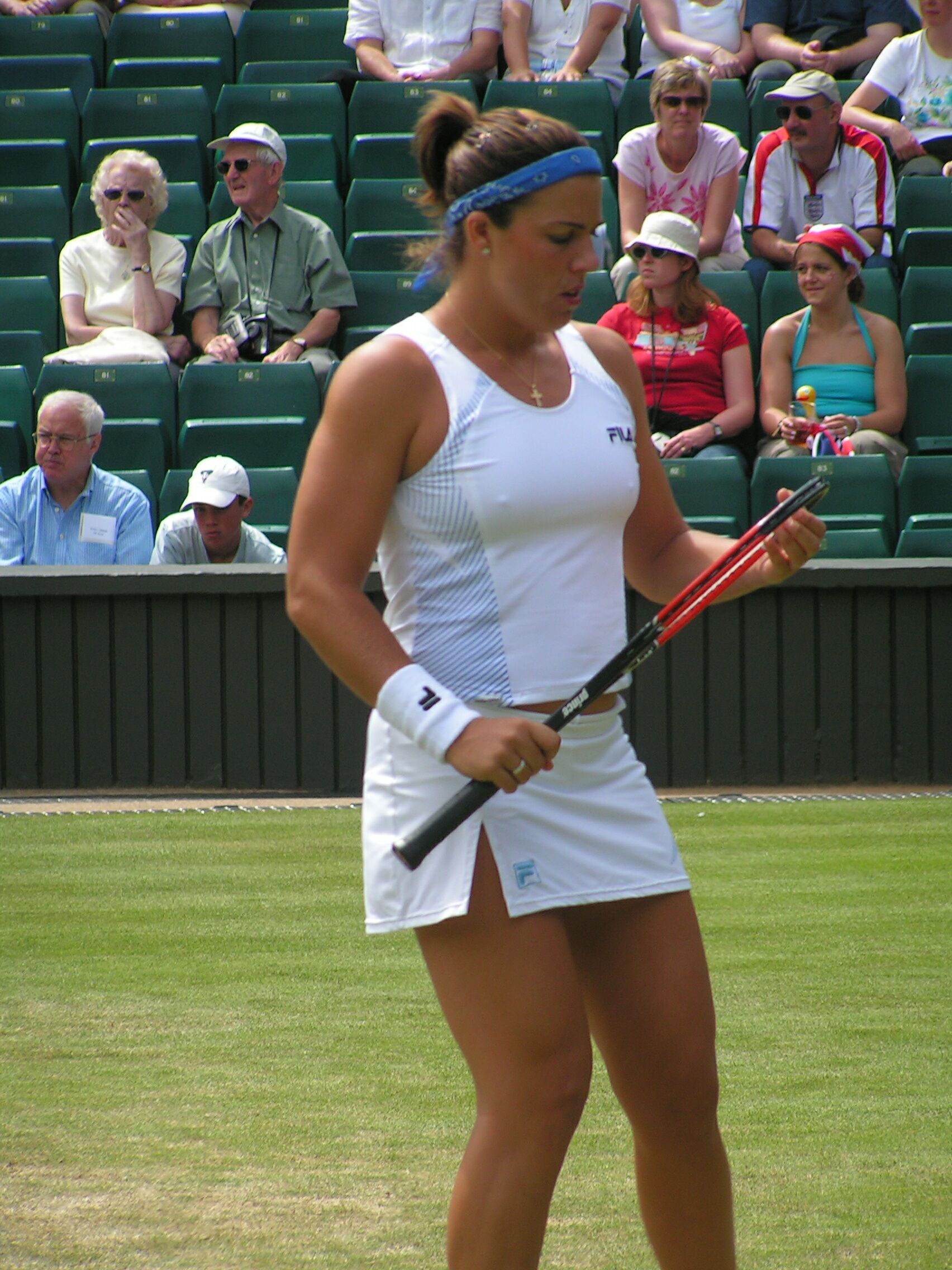
Jennifer Capriati topped her comeback with her first and second Grand Slam titles during 2001, and a brief stay at No. 1 in October.

Despite neither claiming the Australian Open, Hingis and Davenport continued to dominate proceedings for the rest of January and February. The two met again at the Toray Pan Pacific Open, with Davenport triumphing this time to win the title. Hingis won the inaugural events in the Middle East, the Qatar Total FinaElf Open and the Dubai Duty Free Women's Open, while Davenport was also victorious at the State Farm Classic. Meanwhile, Amélie Mauresmo claimed both titles in her home country of France, winning at the Open Gaz de France and the Internationaux de Tennis Feminin Nice; and Monica Seles provided a notable victory over in-form Capriati in the IGA US Indoors final.

The Pacific Life Open saw an all-teen battle commence in its championship match, with 19-year-old Serena Williams reclaiming the title she first won in 1999 by beating 17-year-old Kim Clijsters in the final. Serena's older sister, Venus, responded by winning March's other big title, the Ericsson Open, surviving a nail-biter against Australian Open champion Capriati.

As the clay court season begun in April, Mauresmo continued to enjoy a strong run of form to win her third straight title on the green clay courts of the Bausch & Lomb Championships. Her 16-match win streak, however, was stopped by Hingis in the quarterfinals of the Family Circle Cup—a tournament that saw Capriati win her first Tier I title since the Canadian Open in 1991, defeating Hingis in three sets.

Moving on to the red clay courts, Venus Williams showed devastating form at the Betty Barclay Cup, losing just 12 games en route to the title. Mauresmo once again posted impressive results, taking down Hingis and Capriati to win the Eurocard German Open, and making the final at the Italian Open—only being stopped by Yugoslav teenager Jelena Dokić who was enjoying a career best week to win her first ever singles title.

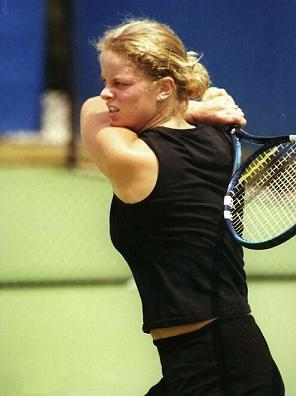
Kim Clijsters finished the year at No. 5 in the world after a breakthrough year, including making her first Slam final.

The French Open provided shocks from early on, with clay court standouts and favourites Mauresmo and Venus Williams both crashing out in the first round. The two upsets blew the bottom half of the draw wide open, allowing Kim Clijsters to reach her first major final, knocking out compatriot Justine Henin in the first all-Belgian semifinal in Grand Slam history. Over on the top half, things went more to plan, with Capriati and Hingis setting up a rematch of that year's Australian Open final. Capriati eased through that, but the final proved to be the bigger challenge. After being two points from defeat on numerous occasions, she eventually triumphed over Clijsters in a 12–10 third set to continue her faultless 14–0 record in Grand Slam play that year.

Wimbledon also opened with an upset: World No. 1 Hingis crashed out in straight sets against Virginia Ruano Pascual, repeating her first round exit of 1999. Lindsay Davenport had returned to action on the grass after missing the entire clay season due to a right knee bone bruise, and instantly established herself as a threat with a title run at the Britannic Asset Championships. She easily advanced to the semifinals, before losing in a rematch of the 2000 final to Venus Williams. On the other side of the draw, Henin snapped Capriati's Grand Slam win streak to become the second straight Belgian player to compete in a major final. However, like Clijsters before her, she went down to the favourite, Williams, who became only the fourth woman in the Open era to win consecutive Wimbledon titles whilst winning her third Grand Slam overall.

Americans players dominated their home turf during the summer hard court swing, with Venus Williams proving to be the standout player for the second straight year. Despite losing to Meghann Shaughnessy at the Bank of the West Classic, she won two events: the Acura Classic and Pilot Pen Tennis, allowing her to head into her US Open title defence on a 9-match winning streak. Davenport also stamped herself as a major contender with a 13–3 win–loss record during the American hard court tournaments, including a title at the estyle.com Classic. Meanwhile, Serena Williams won the other big US Open warm-up tournament, the Rogers AT&T Cup.

Lindsay Davenport won a tour-leading seven titles and finished the year as the No. 1 ranked player.

That year's US Open provided the first ever all-Williams final between sisters Venus and Serena, after both upset the world's top two players in their respective semifinals, Hingis and Capriati. In a historic final that was the first woman's final to be played in prime time, Venus beat her little sister to defend her title and repeat the Wimbledon-US Open double she also did the previous year. It was the first all-sister final at a Grand Slam event since the 1884 Wimbledon Championships, between the Watson sisters, Maud and Lilian.

Davenport proved to be the standout player during the indoor season, winning three tournaments in consecutive weeks: the Porsche Tennis Grand Prix, the Swisscom Challenge and the Generali Ladies Linz, repeating the achievement she also did in 1998. Also performing well were Dokić, who won two titles at the AIG Japan Open and the Kremlin Cup, just two results that capped off her breakthrough season with a rise into the top 10 in the world; and Seles, who finished her season with a 13-match winning streak. Meanwhile, World No. 579 Angelique Widjaja became the lowest-ranked player ever to win a Tour title at the place of her home tournament, the Wismilak International. Off-court, tour stalwarts Nathalie Tauziat and Anke Huber both announced their retirements from singles play.

Elsewhere, Capriati ascended to the No. 1 ranking for the first time in her career on October 15 after an injury caused Hingis to be unable to defend her points from the previous year. Hingis, who had held the No. 1 ranking for the entire season to that point, was also forced to withdraw from the Sanex Championships.

That year's Sanex Championships was also missing Venus Williams, who had to withdraw with a wrist injury. In her absence, sister Serena won the title despite not playing since her U.S. Open final loss to Venus, becoming the first player to win the year-ending championship in their debut appearance. Davenport made the final, but had to default to Williams due to a bone bruise. Nevertheless, with Capriati's quarterfinal loss to Sandrine Testud, Davenport's final appearance was enough for her to gain the No. 1 ranking by just 10 points, her second time in the year-end No. 1 position following 1998.

== Schedule ==
The table below shows the 2001 WTA Tour schedule.

Key

Grand Slam events
Year-end championships
Tier I events
Tier II events
Tier III events
Tier IV and V events
Team events

=== January ===
Week	Tournament	Champions	Runners-up	Semifinalists	Quarterfinalists
1 Jan	Hopman Cup; Perth, Australia; Hopman Cup; Hard (i) – 8 teams (RR)	Switzerland; 2–1	United States	Round robin losers (Group A) South Africa; Thailand; Australia	Round robin losers (Group B) Russia; Slovakia; Belgium
1 Jan	Thalgo Australian Women's Hardcourts; Gold Coast, Australia; Tier III event Hard – $170,000 – 30S/32Q/16D; Singles – Doubles	(Belgium) Justine Henin; 7–6^{(7–5)}, 6–4	(Italy) Silvia Farina Elia	(United States) Meghann Shaughnessy (Switzerland) Patty Schnyder	(Spain) Conchita Martínez (South Africa) Joannette Kruger (Croatia) Silvija Talaja (Germany) Andrea Glass
1 Jan	Thalgo Australian Women's Hardcourts; Gold Coast, Australia; Tier III event Hard – $170,000 – 30S/32Q/16D; Singles – Doubles	(Italy) Giulia Casoni (Slovakia) Janette Husárová; 7–6^{(11–9)}, 7–5	(United States) Katie Schlukebir (United States) Meghann Shaughnessy	(United States) Meghann Shaughnessy (Switzerland) Patty Schnyder	(Spain) Conchita Martínez (South Africa) Joannette Kruger (Croatia) Silvija Talaja (Germany) Andrea Glass
1 Jan	ASB Bank Classic; Auckland, New Zealand; Tier V event Hard – $110,000 – 32S/32Q/16D; Singles – Doubles	(United States) Meilen Tu; 7–6^{(12–10)}, 6–2	(Argentina) Paola Suárez	(Italy) Francesca Schiavone (Germany) Marlene Weingärtner	(Zimbabwe) Cara Black (United States) Lilia Osterloh (Luxembourg) Anne Kremer (United States) Allison Bradshaw
1 Jan	ASB Bank Classic; Auckland, New Zealand; Tier V event Hard – $110,000 – 32S/32Q/16D; Singles – Doubles	(France) Alexandra Fusai (Italy) Rita Grande; 7–6^{(7–4)}, 6–3	(Switzerland) Emmanuelle Gagliardi (Austria) Barbara Schett	(Italy) Francesca Schiavone (Germany) Marlene Weingärtner	(Zimbabwe) Cara Black (United States) Lilia Osterloh (Luxembourg) Anne Kremer (United States) Allison Bradshaw
8 Jan	Adidas International; Sydney, Australia; Tier II event Hard – $565,000 – 28S/32Q/16D; Singles – Doubles	(Switzerland) Martina Hingis; 6–3, 4–6, 7–5	(United States) Lindsay Davenport	(Spain) Conchita Martínez (France) Amélie Mauresmo	(United States) Serena Williams (United States) Corina Morariu (United States) Monica Seles (United States) Lisa Raymond
8 Jan	Adidas International; Sydney, Australia; Tier II event Hard – $565,000 – 28S/32Q/16D; Singles – Doubles	(Russia) Anna Kournikova (Austria) Barbara Schett; 6–2, 7–5	(United States) Lisa Raymond (Australia) Rennae Stubbs	(Spain) Conchita Martínez (France) Amélie Mauresmo	(United States) Serena Williams (United States) Corina Morariu (United States) Monica Seles (United States) Lisa Raymond
8 Jan	Canberra International; Canberra, Australia; Tier III event Hard – $170,000 – 30S/32Q/16D; Singles – Doubles	(Belgium) Justine Henin; 6–2, 6–2	(France) Sandrine Testud	(France) Mary Pierce (France) Nathalie Dechy	(South Africa) Joannette Kruger (Japan) Ai Sugiyama (United States) Chanda Rubin (Russia) Elena Dementieva
8 Jan	Canberra International; Canberra, Australia; Tier III event Hard – $170,000 – 30S/32Q/16D; Singles – Doubles	(United States) Nicole Arendt (Japan) Ai Sugiyama; 6–4, 7–6^{(7–2)}	(South Africa) Nannie de Villiers (Australia) Annabel Ellwood	(France) Mary Pierce (France) Nathalie Dechy	(South Africa) Joannette Kruger (Japan) Ai Sugiyama (United States) Chanda Rubin (Russia) Elena Dementieva
8 Jan	ANZ Tasmanian International; Hobart, Australia; Tier V event Hard – $110,000 – 32S/32Q/16D; Singles – Doubles	(Italy) Rita Grande; 0–6, 6–3, 6–3	(United States) Jennifer Hopkins	(Romania) Ruxandra Dragomir (Zimbabwe) Cara Black	(United States) Amy Frazier (France) Anne-Gaëlle Sidot (United States) Kristina Brandi (Russia) Elena Likhovtseva
8 Jan	ANZ Tasmanian International; Hobart, Australia; Tier V event Hard – $110,000 – 32S/32Q/16D; Singles – Doubles	(Zimbabwe) Cara Black (Russia) Elena Likhovtseva; 6–4, 6–1	(Romania) Ruxandra Dragomir (Spain) Virginia Ruano Pascual	(Romania) Ruxandra Dragomir (Zimbabwe) Cara Black	(United States) Amy Frazier (France) Anne-Gaëlle Sidot (United States) Kristina Brandi (Russia) Elena Likhovtseva
15 Jan; 22 Jan	Australian Open; Melbourne, Australia; Grand Slam; Hard – $3,569,290 – 128S/96Q/64D/32X; Singles – Doubles – Mixed doubles	(United States) Jennifer Capriati; 6–4, 6–3	(Switzerland) Martina Hingis	(United States) Venus Williams (United States) Lindsay Davenport	(United States) Serena Williams (South Africa) Amanda Coetzer (United States) Monica Seles (Russia) Anna Kournikova
15 Jan; 22 Jan	Australian Open; Melbourne, Australia; Grand Slam; Hard – $3,569,290 – 128S/96Q/64D/32X; Singles – Doubles – Mixed doubles	(United States) Serena Williams (United States) Venus Williams; 6–2, 4–6, 6–4	(United States) Lindsay Davenport (United States) Corina Morariu	(United States) Venus Williams (United States) Lindsay Davenport	(United States) Serena Williams (South Africa) Amanda Coetzer (United States) Monica Seles (Russia) Anna Kournikova
15 Jan; 22 Jan	Australian Open; Melbourne, Australia; Grand Slam; Hard – $3,569,290 – 128S/96Q/64D/32X; Singles – Doubles – Mixed doubles	(South Africa) Ellis Ferreira (United States) Corina Morariu; 6–1, 6–3	(Australia) Joshua Eagle (Austria) Barbara Schett	(United States) Venus Williams (United States) Lindsay Davenport	(United States) Serena Williams (South Africa) Amanda Coetzer (United States) Monica Seles (Russia) Anna Kournikova
29 Jan	Toray Pan Pacific Open; Tokyo, Japan; Tier I event Carpet (i) – $1,188,000 – 28S/32Q/16D; Singles – Doubles	(United States) Lindsay Davenport; 6–7^{(4–7)}, 6–4, 6–2	(Switzerland) Martina Hingis	(Bulgaria) Magdalena Maleeva (Russia) Anna Kournikova	(Japan) Ai Sugiyama (Japan) Shinobu Asagoe (France) Anne-Gaëlle Sidot (Croatia) Iva Majoli
29 Jan	Toray Pan Pacific Open; Tokyo, Japan; Tier I event Carpet (i) – $1,188,000 – 28S/32Q/16D; Singles – Doubles	(United States) Lisa Raymond (Australia) Rennae Stubbs; 7–6^{(7–5)}, 2–6, 7–6^{(8–6)}	(Russia) Anna Kournikova (Uzbekistan) Iroda Tulyaganova	(Bulgaria) Magdalena Maleeva (Russia) Anna Kournikova	(Japan) Ai Sugiyama (Japan) Shinobu Asagoe (France) Anne-Gaëlle Sidot (Croatia) Iva Majoli

=== February ===
Week	Tournament	Champions	Runners-up	Semifinalists	Quarterfinalists
5 Feb	Open Gaz de France; Paris, France; Tier II event Hard (i) – $565,000 – 28S/32Q/16D; Singles – Doubles	(France) Amélie Mauresmo; 7–6^{(7–2)}, 6–1	(Germany) Anke Huber	(Bulgaria) Magdalena Maleeva (France) Nathalie Tauziat	(Luxembourg) Anne Kremer (United States) Meghann Shaughnessy (United States) Amy Frazier (Russia) Anna Kournikova
5 Feb	Open Gaz de France; Paris, France; Tier II event Hard (i) – $565,000 – 28S/32Q/16D; Singles – Doubles	(Croatia) Iva Majoli (France) Virginie Razzano; 6–3, 7–5	(United States) Kimberly Po-Messerli (France) Nathalie Tauziat	(Bulgaria) Magdalena Maleeva (France) Nathalie Tauziat	(Luxembourg) Anne Kremer (United States) Meghann Shaughnessy (United States) Amy Frazier (Russia) Anna Kournikova
12 Feb	Internationaux de Tennis Feminin Nice; Nice, France; Tier II event Hard (i) – $565,000 – 28S/32Q/16D; Singles – Doubles	(France) Amélie Mauresmo; 6–2, 6–0	(Bulgaria) Magdalena Maleeva	(United States) Venus Williams (Germany) Anke Huber	(United States) Meilen Tu (Russia) Elena Dementieva (Luxembourg) Anne Kremer (Italy) Silvia Farina Elia
12 Feb	Internationaux de Tennis Feminin Nice; Nice, France; Tier II event Hard (i) – $565,000 – 28S/32Q/16D; Singles – Doubles	(France) Émilie Loit (France) Anne-Gaëlle Sidot; 1–6, 6–2, 6–0	(United States) Kimberly Po-Messerli (France) Nathalie Tauziat	(United States) Venus Williams (Germany) Anke Huber	(United States) Meilen Tu (Russia) Elena Dementieva (Luxembourg) Anne Kremer (Italy) Silvia Farina Elia
12 Feb	Qatar Total Fina Elf Open; Doha, Qatar; Tier III event Hard – $170,000 – 30S/32Q/16D; Singles – Doubles	(Switzerland) Martina Hingis; 6–3, 6–2	(France) Sandrine Testud	(Austria) Barbara Schett (Czech Republic) Adriana Gerši	(South Africa) Joannette Kruger (Russia) Lina Krasnoroutskaya (Slovakia) Henrieta Nagyová (Netherlands) Kristie Boogert
12 Feb	Qatar Total Fina Elf Open; Doha, Qatar; Tier III event Hard – $170,000 – 30S/32Q/16D; Singles – Doubles	(France) Sandrine Testud (Italy) Roberta Vinci; 7–5, 7–6^{(7–4)}	(Netherlands) Kristie Boogert (Netherlands) Miriam Oremans	(Austria) Barbara Schett (Czech Republic) Adriana Gerši	(South Africa) Joannette Kruger (Russia) Lina Krasnoroutskaya (Slovakia) Henrieta Nagyová (Netherlands) Kristie Boogert
19 Feb	Dubai Tennis Championships; Dubai, United Arab Emirates; Tier II event Hard – $565,000 – 28S/32Q/16D; Singles – Doubles	(Switzerland) Martina Hingis; 6–4, 6–4	(France) Nathalie Tauziat	(Thailand) Tamarine Tanasugarn (Australia) Rachel McQuillan	(France) Sandrine Testud (Russia) Lina Krasnoroutskaya (Tunisia) Selima Sfar (France) Mary Pierce
19 Feb	Dubai Tennis Championships; Dubai, United Arab Emirates; Tier II event Hard – $565,000 – 28S/32Q/16D; Singles – Doubles	(Indonesia) Yayuk Basuki (Netherlands) Caroline Vis; 6–0, 4–6, 6–2	(Sweden) Åsa Carlsson (Slovakia) Karina Habšudová	(Thailand) Tamarine Tanasugarn (Australia) Rachel McQuillan	(France) Sandrine Testud (Russia) Lina Krasnoroutskaya (Tunisia) Selima Sfar (France) Mary Pierce
19 Feb	Copa Colsanitas; Bogotá, Colombia; Tier III event Clay – $170,000 – 30S/32Q/16D; Singles – Doubles	(Argentina) Paola Suárez; 6–2, 6–4	(Hungary) Rita Kuti-Kis	(Argentina) Mariana Díaz Oliva (Spain) Cristina Torrens Valero	(Czech Republic) Eva Martincová (Spain) María José Martínez Sánchez (Hungary) Katalin Marosi-Aracama (Colombia) Catalina Castaño
19 Feb	Copa Colsanitas; Bogotá, Colombia; Tier III event Clay – $170,000 – 30S/32Q/16D; Singles – Doubles	(Italy) Tathiana Garbin (Slovakia) Janette Husárová; 6–4, 2–6, 6–4	(Argentina) Laura Montalvo (Argentina) Paola Suárez	(Argentina) Mariana Díaz Oliva (Spain) Cristina Torrens Valero	(Czech Republic) Eva Martincová (Spain) María José Martínez Sánchez (Hungary) Katalin Marosi-Aracama (Colombia) Catalina Castaño
19 Feb	IGA US Indoors; Oklahoma City, United States; Tier III event Hard (i) – $170,000 – 30S/32Q/16D; Singles – Doubles	(United States) Monica Seles; 6–3, 5–7, 6–2	(United States) Jennifer Capriati	(Japan) Shinobu Asagoe (Slovakia) Daniela Hantuchová	(United States) Alexandra Stevenson (United States) Lilia Osterloh (Hungary) Anikó Kapros (United States) Lisa Raymond
19 Feb	IGA US Indoors; Oklahoma City, United States; Tier III event Hard (i) – $170,000 – 30S/32Q/16D; Singles – Doubles	(South Africa) Amanda Coetzer (United States) Lori McNeil; 6–3, 2–6, 6–0	(Chinese Taipei) Janet Lee (Indonesia) Wynne Prakusya	(Japan) Shinobu Asagoe (Slovakia) Daniela Hantuchová	(United States) Alexandra Stevenson (United States) Lilia Osterloh (Hungary) Anikó Kapros (United States) Lisa Raymond
26 Feb	State Farm Classic; Scottsdale, United States; Tier II event Hard – $565,000 – 28S/32Q/16D; Singles – Doubles	(United States) Lindsay Davenport; 6–2, 6–3	(United States) Meghann Shaughnessy	(United States) Jennifer Capriati (United States) Monica Seles	(United States) Lisa Raymond (Slovenia) Tina Pisnik (Belgium) Kim Clijsters (Spain) Magüi Serna
26 Feb	State Farm Classic; Scottsdale, United States; Tier II event Hard – $565,000 – 28S/32Q/16D; Singles – Doubles	(United States) Lisa Raymond (Australia) Rennae Stubbs; Walkover	(Belgium) Kim Clijsters (United States) Meghann Shaughnessy	(United States) Jennifer Capriati (United States) Monica Seles	(United States) Lisa Raymond (Slovenia) Tina Pisnik (Belgium) Kim Clijsters (Spain) Magüi Serna
26 Feb	Abierto Mexicano Pegaso; Acapulco, Mexico; Tier III event Clay – $170,000 – 30S/32Q/16D; Singles – Doubles	(South Africa) Amanda Coetzer; 2–6, 6–1, 6–2	(Russia) Elena Dementieva	(Argentina) Paola Suárez (Spain) Nuria Llagostera Vives	(Hungary) Rita Kuti-Kis (Spain) Ángeles Montolio (Argentina) Mariana Díaz Oliva (United States) Corina Morariu
26 Feb	Abierto Mexicano Pegaso; Acapulco, Mexico; Tier III event Clay – $170,000 – 30S/32Q/16D; Singles – Doubles	(Spain) María José Martínez Sánchez (Spain) Anabel Medina Garrigues; 6–4, 6–7^{(5–7)}, 7–5	(Spain) Virginia Ruano Pascual (Argentina) Paola Suárez	(Argentina) Paola Suárez (Spain) Nuria Llagostera Vives	(Hungary) Rita Kuti-Kis (Spain) Ángeles Montolio (Argentina) Mariana Díaz Oliva (United States) Corina Morariu

=== March ===
Week	Tournament	Champions	Runners-up	Semifinalists	Quarterfinalists
5 Mar; 12 Mar	Pacific Life Open; Indian Wells, United States; Tier I event Hard – $2,000,000 – 96S/48Q/32D; Singles – Doubles	(United States) Serena Williams; 4–6, 6–4, 6–2	(Belgium) Kim Clijsters	(Switzerland) Martina Hingis (United States) Venus Williams	(Italy) Silvia Farina Elia (Russia) Elena Bovina (Russia) Elena Dementieva (United States) Lindsay Davenport
5 Mar; 12 Mar	Pacific Life Open; Indian Wells, United States; Tier I event Hard – $2,000,000 – 96S/48Q/32D; Singles – Doubles	(United States) Nicole Arendt (Japan) Ai Sugiyama; 6–4, 6–4	(Spain) Virginia Ruano Pascual (Argentina) Paola Suárez	(Switzerland) Martina Hingis (United States) Venus Williams	(Italy) Silvia Farina Elia (Russia) Elena Bovina (Russia) Elena Dementieva (United States) Lindsay Davenport
19 Mar; 26 Mar	Ericsson Open; Key Biscayne, United States; Tier I event Hard – $2,720,000 – 96S/48Q/32D; Singles – Doubles	(United States) Venus Williams; 4–6, 6–1, 7–6^{(7–4)}	(United States) Jennifer Capriati	(Switzerland) Martina Hingis (Russia) Elena Dementieva	(Germany) Anke Huber (Federal Republic of Yugoslavia) Jelena Dokić (United States) Serena Williams (United States) Lindsay Davenport
19 Mar; 26 Mar	Ericsson Open; Key Biscayne, United States; Tier I event Hard – $2,720,000 – 96S/48Q/32D; Singles – Doubles	(Spain) Arantxa Sánchez Vicario (France) Nathalie Tauziat; 6–0, 6–4	(United States) Lisa Raymond (Australia) Rennae Stubbs	(Switzerland) Martina Hingis (Russia) Elena Dementieva	(Germany) Anke Huber (Federal Republic of Yugoslavia) Jelena Dokić (United States) Serena Williams (United States) Lindsay Davenport

=== April ===
Week	Tournament	Champions	Runners-up	Semifinalists	Quarterfinalists
2 Apr	Porto Open; Porto, Portugal; Tier IV event Clay – $140,000 – 32S/32Q/16D; Singles – Doubles	(Spain) Arantxa Sánchez Vicario; 6–3, 6–1	(Spain) Magüi Serna	(Italy) Silvia Farina Elia (Croatia) Silvija Talaja	(Hungary) Petra Mandula (Slovakia) Ľudmila Cervanová (Hungary) Rita Kuti-Kis (Bulgaria) Lubomira Bacheva
2 Apr	Porto Open; Porto, Portugal; Tier IV event Clay – $140,000 – 32S/32Q/16D; Singles – Doubles	(Spain) María José Martínez Sánchez (Spain) Anabel Medina Garrigues; 6–1, 6–7^{(5–7)}, 7–5	(France) Alexandra Fusai (Italy) Rita Grande	(Italy) Silvia Farina Elia (Croatia) Silvija Talaja	(Hungary) Petra Mandula (Slovakia) Ľudmila Cervanová (Hungary) Rita Kuti-Kis (Bulgaria) Lubomira Bacheva
9 Apr	Bausch & Lomb Championships; Amelia Island, United States; Tier II event Clay – $565,000 (green) – 56S/16Q/16D; Singles – Doubles	(France) Amélie Mauresmo; 6–4, 7–5	(South Africa) Amanda Coetzer	(Spain) Arantxa Sánchez Vicario (Russia) Nadia Petrova	(Switzerland) Martina Hingis (Russia) Elena Dementieva (United States) Meghann Shaughnessy (Italy) Silvia Farina Elia
9 Apr	Bausch & Lomb Championships; Amelia Island, United States; Tier II event Clay – $565,000 (green) – 56S/16Q/16D; Singles – Doubles	(Spain) Conchita Martínez (Argentina) Patricia Tarabini; 6–4, 6–2	(United States) Martina Navratilova (Spain) Arantxa Sánchez Vicario	(Spain) Arantxa Sánchez Vicario (Russia) Nadia Petrova	(Switzerland) Martina Hingis (Russia) Elena Dementieva (United States) Meghann Shaughnessy (Italy) Silvia Farina Elia
9 Apr	Estoril Open; Oeiras, Portugal; Tier IV event Clay – $140,000 – 32S/32Q/16D; Singles – Doubles	(Spain) Ángeles Montolio; 3–6, 6–3, 6–2	(Russia) Elena Bovina	(Belgium) Justine Henin (Germany) Jana Kandarr	(Italy) Rita Grande (Italy) Francesca Schiavone (Slovenia) Tina Pisnik (Italy) Tathiana Garbin
9 Apr	Estoril Open; Oeiras, Portugal; Tier IV event Clay – $140,000 – 32S/32Q/16D; Singles – Doubles	(Czech Republic) Květa Hrdličková (Germany) Barbara Rittner; 3–6, 7–5, 6–1	(Slovenia) Tina Križan (Slovenia) Katarina Srebotnik	(Belgium) Justine Henin (Germany) Jana Kandarr	(Italy) Rita Grande (Italy) Francesca Schiavone (Slovenia) Tina Pisnik (Italy) Tathiana Garbin
16 Apr	Family Circle Cup; Charleston, United States; Tier I event Clay – $1,200,000 (green) – 56S/32Q/28D; Singles – Doubles	(United States) Jennifer Capriati; 6–0, 4–6, 6–4	(Switzerland) Martina Hingis	(Spain) Conchita Martínez (Germany) Marlene Weingärtner	(France) Amélie Mauresmo (United States) Amy Frazier (South Africa) Amanda Coetzer (Russia) Elena Likhovtseva
16 Apr	Family Circle Cup; Charleston, United States; Tier I event Clay – $1,200,000 (green) – 56S/32Q/28D; Singles – Doubles	(United States) Lisa Raymond (Australia) Rennae Stubbs; 5–7, 7–6^{(7–5)}, 6–3	(Spain) Virginia Ruano Pascual (Argentina) Paola Suárez	(Spain) Conchita Martínez (Germany) Marlene Weingärtner	(France) Amélie Mauresmo (United States) Amy Frazier (South Africa) Amanda Coetzer (Russia) Elena Likhovtseva
16 Apr	Colortex Budapest Grand Prix; Budapest, Hungary; Tier V event Clay – $110,000 – 32S/32Q/16D; Singles – Doubles	(Bulgaria) Magdalena Maleeva; 3–6, 6–2, 6–4	(Luxembourg) Anne Kremer	(Spain) Cristina Torrens Valero (Hungary) Anikó Kapros	(Italy) Francesca Schiavone (Spain) Ángeles Montolio (France) Émilie Loit (Hungary) Petra Mandula
16 Apr	Colortex Budapest Grand Prix; Budapest, Hungary; Tier V event Clay – $110,000 – 32S/32Q/16D; Singles – Doubles	(Italy) Tathiana Garbin (Slovakia) Janette Husárová; 6–1, 6–3	(Hungary) Zsófia Gubacsi (Federal Republic of Yugoslavia) Dragana Zarić	(Spain) Cristina Torrens Valero (Hungary) Anikó Kapros	(Italy) Francesca Schiavone (Spain) Ángeles Montolio (France) Émilie Loit (Hungary) Petra Mandula
30 Apr	Betty Barclay Cup; Hamburg, Germany; Tier II event Clay – $565,000 – 28S/32Q/16D; Singles – Doubles	(United States) Venus Williams; 6–3, 6–0	(United States) Meghann Shaughnessy	(Federal Republic of Yugoslavia) Jelena Dokić (South Africa) Amanda Coetzer	(Italy) Silvia Farina Elia (Spain) Arantxa Sánchez Vicario (Switzerland) Patty Schnyder (Belgium) Justine Henin
30 Apr	Betty Barclay Cup; Hamburg, Germany; Tier II event Clay – $565,000 – 28S/32Q/16D; Singles – Doubles	(Zimbabwe) Cara Black (Russia) Elena Likhovtseva; 6–2, 4–6, 6–2	(Czech Republic) Květa Hrdličková (Germany) Barbara Rittner	(Federal Republic of Yugoslavia) Jelena Dokić (South Africa) Amanda Coetzer	(Italy) Silvia Farina Elia (Spain) Arantxa Sánchez Vicario (Switzerland) Patty Schnyder (Belgium) Justine Henin
30 Apr	Croatian Bol Ladies Open; Bol, Croatia; Tier III event Clay – $170,000 – 30S/32Q/16D; Singles – Doubles	(Spain) Ángeles Montolio; 3–6, 6–2, 6–4	(Argentina) Mariana Díaz Oliva	(Belgium) Kim Clijsters (France) Sandrine Testud	(New Zealand) Pavlina Nola (Israel) Anna Smashnova (Slovenia) Tina Pisnik (Germany) Marlene Weingärtner
30 Apr	Croatian Bol Ladies Open; Bol, Croatia; Tier III event Clay – $170,000 – 30S/32Q/16D; Singles – Doubles	(Spain) María José Martínez Sánchez (Spain) Anabel Medina Garrigues; 7–5, 6–4	(Russia) Nadia Petrova (Slovenia) Tina Pisnik	(Belgium) Kim Clijsters (France) Sandrine Testud	(New Zealand) Pavlina Nola (Israel) Anna Smashnova (Slovenia) Tina Pisnik (Germany) Marlene Weingärtner

=== May ===
Week	Tournament	Champions	Runners-up	Semifinalists	Quarterfinalists
7 May	Eurocard German Open; Berlin, Germany; Tier I event Clay – $1,185,000 – 56S/32Q/28D; Singles – Doubles	(France) Amélie Mauresmo; 6–4, 2–6, 6–3	(United States) Jennifer Capriati	(Switzerland) Martina Hingis (Belgium) Justine Henin	(Spain) Arantxa Sánchez Vicario (South Africa) Amanda Coetzer (Spain) Conchita Martínez (Germany) Miriam Schnitzer
7 May	Eurocard German Open; Berlin, Germany; Tier I event Clay – $1,185,000 – 56S/32Q/28D; Singles – Doubles	(Belgium) Els Callens (United States) Meghann Shaughnessy; 6–4, 6–3	(Zimbabwe) Cara Black (Russia) Elena Likhovtseva	(Switzerland) Martina Hingis (Belgium) Justine Henin	(Spain) Arantxa Sánchez Vicario (South Africa) Amanda Coetzer (Spain) Conchita Martínez (Germany) Miriam Schnitzer
14 May	Italian Open; Rome, Italy; Tier I event Clay – $1,200,000 – 56S/48Q/28D; Singles – Doubles	(Federal Republic of Yugoslavia) Jelena Dokić; 7–6^{(7–3)}, 6–1	(France) Amélie Mauresmo	(Switzerland) Martina Hingis (Spain) Conchita Martínez	(Spain) Arantxa Sánchez Vicario (Argentina) Paola Suárez (Italy) Francesca Schiavone (South Africa) Joannette Kruger
14 May	Italian Open; Rome, Italy; Tier I event Clay – $1,200,000 – 56S/48Q/28D; Singles – Doubles	(Zimbabwe) Cara Black (Russia) Elena Likhovtseva; 6–1, 6–1	(Argentina) Paola Suárez (Argentina) Patricia Tarabini	(Switzerland) Martina Hingis (Spain) Conchita Martínez	(Spain) Arantxa Sánchez Vicario (Argentina) Paola Suárez (Italy) Francesca Schiavone (South Africa) Joannette Kruger
14 May	TennisCup Vlaanderen; Antwerp, Belgium; Tier V event Clay – $110,000 – 32S/32Q/16D; Singles – Doubles	(Germany) Barbara Rittner; 6–3, 6–2	(Czech Republic) Klára Koukalová	(Spain) Eva Bes (Spain) Anabel Medina Garrigues	(Belgium) Laurence Courtois (Spain) María José Martínez Sánchez (Israel) Anna Smashnova (Spain) Virginia Ruano Pascual
14 May	TennisCup Vlaanderen; Antwerp, Belgium; Tier V event Clay – $110,000 – 32S/32Q/16D; Singles – Doubles	(Belgium) Els Callens (Spain) Virginia Ruano Pascual; 6–3, 3–6, 6–4	(Netherlands) Kristie Boogert (Netherlands) Miriam Oremans	(Spain) Eva Bes (Spain) Anabel Medina Garrigues	(Belgium) Laurence Courtois (Spain) María José Martínez Sánchez (Israel) Anna Smashnova (Spain) Virginia Ruano Pascual
21 May	Internationaux de Strasbourg; Strasbourg, France; Tier III event Clay – $170,000 – 30S/32Q/16D; Singles – Doubles	(Italy) Silvia Farina Elia; 7–5, 0–6, 6–4	(Germany) Anke Huber	(France) Céline Beigbeder (France) Nathalie Tauziat	(Japan) Ai Sugiyama (Hungary) Rita Kuti-Kis (Uzbekistan) Iroda Tulyaganova (United States) Meghann Shaughnessy
21 May	Internationaux de Strasbourg; Strasbourg, France; Tier III event Clay – $170,000 – 30S/32Q/16D; Singles – Doubles	(Italy) Silvia Farina Elia (Uzbekistan) Iroda Tulyaganova; 6–1, 7–6^{(7–0)}	(South Africa) Amanda Coetzer (United States) Lori McNeil	(France) Céline Beigbeder (France) Nathalie Tauziat	(Japan) Ai Sugiyama (Hungary) Rita Kuti-Kis (Uzbekistan) Iroda Tulyaganova (United States) Meghann Shaughnessy
21 May	Open de España Villa de Madrid; Madrid, Spain; Tier III event Clay – $170,000 – 30S/32Q/16D; Singles – Doubles	(Spain) Arantxa Sánchez Vicario; 7–5, 6–0	(Spain) Ángeles Montolio	(Spain) Anabel Medina Garrigues (Spain) María José Martínez Sánchez	(Paraguay) Rossana de los Ríos (Spain) Magüi Serna (France) Sandrine Testud (United States) Lisa Raymond
21 May	Open de España Villa de Madrid; Madrid, Spain; Tier III event Clay – $170,000 – 30S/32Q/16D; Singles – Doubles	(Spain) Virginia Ruano Pascual (Argentina) Paola Suárez; 7–5, 2–6, 7–6^{(7–4)}	(United States) Lisa Raymond (Australia) Rennae Stubbs	(Spain) Anabel Medina Garrigues (Spain) María José Martínez Sánchez	(Paraguay) Rossana de los Ríos (Spain) Magüi Serna (France) Sandrine Testud (United States) Lisa Raymond
28 May; 4 June	French Open; Paris, France; Grand Slam; Clay – $3,745,147 – 128S/96Q/64D/32X; Singles – Doubles – Mixed doubles	(United States) Jennifer Capriati; 1–6, 6–4, 12–10	(Belgium) Kim Clijsters	(Switzerland) Martina Hingis (Belgium) Justine Henin	(Italy) Francesca Schiavone (United States) Serena Williams (Hungary) Petra Mandula (Russia) Lina Krasnoroutskaya
28 May; 4 June	French Open; Paris, France; Grand Slam; Clay – $3,745,147 – 128S/96Q/64D/32X; Singles – Doubles – Mixed doubles	(Spain) Virginia Ruano Pascual (Argentina) Paola Suárez; 6–2, 6–1	(Federal Republic of Yugoslavia) Jelena Dokić (Spain) Conchita Martínez	(Switzerland) Martina Hingis (Belgium) Justine Henin	(Italy) Francesca Schiavone (United States) Serena Williams (Hungary) Petra Mandula (Russia) Lina Krasnoroutskaya
28 May; 4 June	French Open; Paris, France; Grand Slam; Clay – $3,745,147 – 128S/96Q/64D/32X; Singles – Doubles – Mixed doubles	(Spain) Tomás Carbonell (Spain) Virginia Ruano Pascual; 7–5, 6–3	(Brazil) Jaime Oncins (Argentina) Paola Suárez	(Switzerland) Martina Hingis (Belgium) Justine Henin	(Italy) Francesca Schiavone (United States) Serena Williams (Hungary) Petra Mandula (Russia) Lina Krasnoroutskaya

=== June ===
Week	Tournament	Champions	Runners-up	Semifinalists	Quarterfinalists
11 Jun	DFS Classic; Birmingham, Great Britain; Tier III event Grass – $170,000 – 56S/32Q/16D; Singles – Doubles	(France) Nathalie Tauziat; 6–3, 7–5	(Netherlands) Miriam Oremans	(United States) Lisa Raymond (Slovakia) Daniela Hantuchová	(Luxembourg) Anne Kremer (Russia) Elena Likhovtseva (France) Virginie Razzano (United States) Kristina Brandi
11 Jun	DFS Classic; Birmingham, Great Britain; Tier III event Grass – $170,000 – 56S/32Q/16D; Singles – Doubles	(Zimbabwe) Cara Black (Russia) Elena Likhovtseva; 6–1, 6–1	(United States) Kimberly Po-Messerli (France) Nathalie Tauziat	(United States) Lisa Raymond (Slovakia) Daniela Hantuchová	(Luxembourg) Anne Kremer (Russia) Elena Likhovtseva (France) Virginie Razzano (United States) Kristina Brandi
11 Jun	Tashkent Open; Tashkent, Uzbekistan; Tier IV event Hard – $140,000 – 32S/32Q/16D; Singles – Doubles	(Germany) Bianka Lamade; 6–3, 2–6, 6–2	(Netherlands) Seda Noorlander	(Switzerland) Marie-Gayanay Mikaelian (Spain) Cristina Torrens Valero	(Indonesia) Wynne Prakusya (Czech Republic) Alena Vašková (Uzbekistan) Iroda Tulyaganova (Chinese Taipei) Janet Lee
11 Jun	Tashkent Open; Tashkent, Uzbekistan; Tier IV event Hard – $140,000 – 32S/32Q/16D; Singles – Doubles	(Hungary) Petra Mandula (Austria) Patricia Wartusch; 6–1, 6–4	(Ukraine) Tatiana Perebiynis (Belarus) Tatiana Poutchek	(Switzerland) Marie-Gayanay Mikaelian (Spain) Cristina Torrens Valero	(Indonesia) Wynne Prakusya (Czech Republic) Alena Vašková (Uzbekistan) Iroda Tulyaganova (Chinese Taipei) Janet Lee
18 Jun	Britannic Asset Championships; Eastbourne, Great Britain; Tier II event Grass – $565,000 – 28S/32Q/16D; Singles – Doubles	(United States) Lindsay Davenport; 6–2, 6–0	(Spain) Magüi Serna	(United States) Chanda Rubin (Russia) Elena Likhovtseva	(Italy) Silvia Farina Elia (United States) Lisa Raymond (United States) Meghann Shaughnessy (Thailand) Tamarine Tanasugarn
18 Jun	Britannic Asset Championships; Eastbourne, Great Britain; Tier II event Grass – $565,000 – 28S/32Q/16D; Singles – Doubles	(United States) Lisa Raymond (Australia) Rennae Stubbs; 6–2, 6–2	(Zimbabwe) Cara Black (Russia) Elena Likhovtseva	(United States) Chanda Rubin (Russia) Elena Likhovtseva	(Italy) Silvia Farina Elia (United States) Lisa Raymond (United States) Meghann Shaughnessy (Thailand) Tamarine Tanasugarn
18 Jun	Heineken Trophy 's-Hertogenbosch, Netherlands; Tier III event Grass – $170,000 – 30S/16D; Singles – Doubles	(Belgium) Justine Henin; 6–4, 3–6, 6–3	(Belgium) Kim Clijsters	(Federal Republic of Yugoslavia) Jelena Dokić (Uzbekistan) Iroda Tulyaganova	(United States) Kristina Brandi (Slovakia) Henrieta Nagyová (Russia) Tatiana Panova (Russia) Elena Bovina
18 Jun	Heineken Trophy 's-Hertogenbosch, Netherlands; Tier III event Grass – $170,000 – 30S/16D; Singles – Doubles	(Romania) Ruxandra Dragomir Ilie (Russia) Nadia Petrova; 7–6^{(7–5)}, 6–7^{(5–7)}, 6–4	(Belgium) Kim Clijsters (Netherlands) Miriam Oremans	(Federal Republic of Yugoslavia) Jelena Dokić (Uzbekistan) Iroda Tulyaganova	(United States) Kristina Brandi (Slovakia) Henrieta Nagyová (Russia) Tatiana Panova (Russia) Elena Bovina
25 Jun; 2 Jul	Wimbledon Championships; London, Great Britain; Grand Slam; Grass – $4,545,319 – 128S/96Q/64D/32X; Singles – Doubles – Mixed doubles	(United States) Venus Williams; 6–1, 3–6, 6–0	(Belgium) Justine Henin	(United States) Jennifer Capriati (United States) Lindsay Davenport	(Spain) Conchita Martínez (United States) Serena Williams (Belgium) Kim Clijsters (France) Nathalie Tauziat
25 Jun; 2 Jul	Wimbledon Championships; London, Great Britain; Grand Slam; Grass – $4,545,319 – 128S/96Q/64D/32X; Singles – Doubles – Mixed doubles	(United States) Lisa Raymond (Australia) Rennae Stubbs; 6–4, 6–3	(Belgium) Kim Clijsters (Japan) Ai Sugiyama	(United States) Jennifer Capriati (United States) Lindsay Davenport	(Spain) Conchita Martínez (United States) Serena Williams (Belgium) Kim Clijsters (France) Nathalie Tauziat
25 Jun; 2 Jul	Wimbledon Championships; London, Great Britain; Grand Slam; Grass – $4,545,319 – 128S/96Q/64D/32X; Singles – Doubles – Mixed doubles	(Czech Republic) Leoš Friedl (Slovakia) Daniela Hantuchová; 4–6, 6–3, 6–2	(United States) Mike Bryan (Zimbabwe) Cara Black	(United States) Jennifer Capriati (United States) Lindsay Davenport	(Spain) Conchita Martínez (United States) Serena Williams (Belgium) Kim Clijsters (France) Nathalie Tauziat

=== July ===
Week	Tournament	Champions	Runners-up	Semifinalists	Quarterfinalists
9 Jul	Uniqa Grand Prix; Vienna, Austria; Tier III event Clay – $300,000 – 30S/32Q/16D; Singles – Doubles	(Uzbekistan) Iroda Tulyaganova; 6–3, 6–2	(Switzerland) Patty Schnyder	(Argentina) Paola Suárez (Croatia) Jelena Kostanić	(Spain) Marta Marrero (Austria) Barbara Schett (Germany) Anke Huber (Israel) Anna Smashnova
9 Jul	Uniqa Grand Prix; Vienna, Austria; Tier III event Clay – $300,000 – 30S/32Q/16D; Singles – Doubles	(Argentina) Paola Suárez (Argentina) Patricia Tarabini; 6–4, 6–2	(Germany) Vanessa Henke (Czech Republic) Lenka Němečková	(Argentina) Paola Suárez (Croatia) Jelena Kostanić	(Spain) Marta Marrero (Austria) Barbara Schett (Germany) Anke Huber (Israel) Anna Smashnova
9 Jul	Internazionali Femminili di Palermo; Palermo, Italy; Tier V event Clay – $110,000 – 32S/28Q/16D; Singles – Doubles	(Spain) Anabel Medina Garrigues; 6–4, 6–4	(Spain) Cristina Torrens Valero	(Spain) Gala León García (Sweden) Åsa Carlsson	(Spain) Magüi Serna (Italy) Tathiana Garbin (Italy) Francesca Schiavone (Russia) Tatiana Panova
9 Jul	Internazionali Femminili di Palermo; Palermo, Italy; Tier V event Clay – $110,000 – 32S/28Q/16D; Singles – Doubles	(Italy) Tathiana Garbin (Slovakia) Janette Husárová; 4–6, 6–2, 6–4	(Spain) María José Martínez Sánchez (Spain) Anabel Medina Garrigues	(Spain) Gala León García (Sweden) Åsa Carlsson	(Spain) Magüi Serna (Italy) Tathiana Garbin (Italy) Francesca Schiavone (Russia) Tatiana Panova
16 Jul	Sanex Trophy; Knokke-Heist, Belgium; Tier IV event Clay – $150,000 – 32S/32Q/16D; Singles – Doubles	(Uzbekistan) Iroda Tulyaganova; 6–2, 6–3	(Spain) Gala León García	(Belgium) Kim Clijsters (Spain) Marta Marrero	(Spain) Magüi Serna (Spain) Ángeles Montolio (Spain) Cristina Torrens Valero (Paraguay) Rossana de los Ríos
16 Jul	Sanex Trophy; Knokke-Heist, Belgium; Tier IV event Clay – $150,000 – 32S/32Q/16D; Singles – Doubles	(Spain) Virginia Ruano Pascual (Spain) Magüi Serna; 6–4, 6–3	(Romania) Ruxandra Dragomir Ilie (Romania) Andreea Ehritt-Vanc	(Belgium) Kim Clijsters (Spain) Marta Marrero	(Spain) Magüi Serna (Spain) Ángeles Montolio (Spain) Cristina Torrens Valero (Paraguay) Rossana de los Ríos
23 Jul	Bank of the West Classic; Stanford, United States; Tier II event Hard – $565,000 – 28S/32Q/16D; Singles – Doubles	(Belgium) Kim Clijsters; 6–4, 6–7^{(5–7)}, 6–1	(United States) Lindsay Davenport	(United States) Meghann Shaughnessy (United States) Monica Seles	(United States) Venus Williams (United States) Chanda Rubin (United States) Lilia Osterloh (Germany) Jana Kandarr
23 Jul	Bank of the West Classic; Stanford, United States; Tier II event Hard – $565,000 – 28S/32Q/16D; Singles – Doubles	(Chinese Taipei) Janet Lee (Indonesia) Wynne Prakusya; 3–6, 6–3, 6–3	(United States) Nicole Arendt (Netherlands) Caroline Vis	(United States) Meghann Shaughnessy (United States) Monica Seles	(United States) Venus Williams (United States) Chanda Rubin (United States) Lilia Osterloh (Germany) Jana Kandarr
23 Jul	Idea Prokom Open; Sopot, Poland; Tier III event Clay – $170,000 – 30S/32Q/16D; Singles – Doubles	(Spain) Cristina Torrens Valero; 6–2, 6–2	(Spain) Gala León García	(Federal Republic of Yugoslavia) Jelena Dokić (Italy) Silvia Farina Elia	(Germany) Anke Huber (Argentina) Mariana Díaz Oliva (Slovakia) Henrieta Nagyová (Belarus) Tatiana Poutchek
23 Jul	Idea Prokom Open; Sopot, Poland; Tier III event Clay – $170,000 – 30S/32Q/16D; Singles – Doubles	(South Africa) Joannette Kruger (Italy) Francesca Schiavone; 6–4, 6–0	(Ukraine) Tatiana Perebiynis (Russia) Anastasia Rodionova	(Federal Republic of Yugoslavia) Jelena Dokić (Italy) Silvia Farina Elia	(Germany) Anke Huber (Argentina) Mariana Díaz Oliva (Slovakia) Henrieta Nagyová (Belarus) Tatiana Poutchek
23 Jul	GP SAR La Princesse Lalla Meryem; Casablanca, Morocco; Tier V event Clay – $110,000 – 32S/26Q/16D; Singles – Doubles	(Hungary) Zsófia Gubacsi; 1–6, 6–3, 7–6^{(7–5)}	(Italy) Maria Elena Camerin	(France) Émilie Loit (Hungary) Anikó Kapros	(Slovakia) Martina Suchá (Germany) Anca Barna (Czech Republic) Lenka Němečková (Argentina) María Emilia Salerni
23 Jul	GP SAR La Princesse Lalla Meryem; Casablanca, Morocco; Tier V event Clay – $110,000 – 32S/26Q/16D; Singles – Doubles	(Bulgaria) Lubomira Bacheva (Sweden) Åsa Carlsson; 6–3, 6–7^{(4–7)}, 6–1	(Spain) María José Martínez Sánchez (Argentina) María Emilia Salerni	(France) Émilie Loit (Hungary) Anikó Kapros	(Slovakia) Martina Suchá (Germany) Anca Barna (Czech Republic) Lenka Němečková (Argentina) María Emilia Salerni
30 Jul	Acura Classic; San Diego, United States; Tier II event Hard – $750,000 – 56S/16Q/16D; Singles – Doubles	(United States) Venus Williams; 6–2, 6–3	(United States) Monica Seles	(Switzerland) Martina Hingis (United States) Lindsay Davenport	(Japan) Ai Sugiyama (United States) Jennifer Capriati (France) Sandrine Testud (France) Nathalie Tauziat
30 Jul	Acura Classic; San Diego, United States; Tier II event Hard – $750,000 – 56S/16Q/16D; Singles – Doubles	(Zimbabwe) Cara Black (Russia) Elena Likhovtseva; 6–4, 1–6, 6–4	(Switzerland) Martina Hingis (Russia) Anna Kournikova	(Switzerland) Martina Hingis (United States) Lindsay Davenport	(Japan) Ai Sugiyama (United States) Jennifer Capriati (France) Sandrine Testud (France) Nathalie Tauziat
30 Jul	PreCon Open; Basel, Switzerland; Tier IV event Clay – $140,000 – 32S/32Q/16D; Singles – Doubles	(Czech Republic) Adriana Gerši; 6–4, 6–1	(Switzerland) Marie-Gayanay Mikaelian	(Israel) Anna Smashnova (Spain) Cristina Torrens Valero	(Slovakia) Daniela Hantuchová (Germany) Bianka Lamade (Germany) Martina Müller (Germany) Gréta Arn
30 Jul	PreCon Open; Basel, Switzerland; Tier IV event Clay – $140,000 – 32S/32Q/16D; Singles – Doubles	(Spain) María José Martínez Sánchez (Spain) Anabel Medina Garrigues; 6–2, 7–5	(South Africa) Joannette Kruger (Spain) Marta Marrero	(Israel) Anna Smashnova (Spain) Cristina Torrens Valero	(Slovakia) Daniela Hantuchová (Germany) Bianka Lamade (Germany) Martina Müller (Germany) Gréta Arn

=== August ===
Week	Tournament	Champions	Runners-up	Semifinalists	Quarterfinalists
6 Aug	estyle.com Classic; Manhattan Beach, United States; Tier II event Hard – $565,000 – 56S/16Q/16D; Singles – Doubles	(United States) Lindsay Davenport; 6–3, 7–5	(United States) Monica Seles	(Switzerland) Martina Hingis (France) Nathalie Tauziat	(United States) Amy Frazier (United States) Serena Williams (Belgium) Kim Clijsters (Russia) Elena Dementieva
6 Aug	estyle.com Classic; Manhattan Beach, United States; Tier II event Hard – $565,000 – 56S/16Q/16D; Singles – Doubles	(United States) Kimberly Po-Messerli (France) Nathalie Tauziat; 6–3, 7–5	(United States) Nicole Arendt (Netherlands) Caroline Vis	(Switzerland) Martina Hingis (France) Nathalie Tauziat	(United States) Amy Frazier (United States) Serena Williams (Belgium) Kim Clijsters (Russia) Elena Dementieva
13 Aug	Rogers AT&T Cup; Toronto, Canada; Tier I event Hard – $1,200,000 – 56S/32Q/28D; Singles – Doubles	(United States) Serena Williams; 6–1, 6–7^{(7–9)}, 6–3	(United States) Jennifer Capriati	(Germany) Anke Huber (United States) Monica Seles	(United States) Meghann Shaughnessy (United States) Jennifer Hopkins (France) Sandrine Testud (Belgium) Justine Henin
13 Aug	Rogers AT&T Cup; Toronto, Canada; Tier I event Hard – $1,200,000 – 56S/32Q/28D; Singles – Doubles	(United States) Kimberly Po-Messerli (Australia) Nicole Pratt; 6–3, 6–1	(Slovenia) Tina Križan (Slovenia) Katarina Srebotnik	(Germany) Anke Huber (United States) Monica Seles	(United States) Meghann Shaughnessy (United States) Jennifer Hopkins (France) Sandrine Testud (Belgium) Justine Henin
20 Aug	Pilot Pen Tennis; New Haven, United States; Tier II event Hard – $565,000 – 28S/32Q/16D; Singles – Doubles	(United States) Venus Williams; 7–6^{(8–6)}, 6–4	(United States) Lindsay Davenport	(Belgium) Kim Clijsters (United States) Jennifer Capriati	(France) Amélie Mauresmo (France) Nathalie Tauziat (Belgium) Justine Henin (Federal Republic of Yugoslavia) Jelena Dokić
20 Aug	Pilot Pen Tennis; New Haven, United States; Tier II event Hard – $565,000 – 28S/32Q/16D; Singles – Doubles	(Zimbabwe) Cara Black (Russia) Elena Likhovtseva; 6–0, 3–6, 6–2	(Federal Republic of Yugoslavia) Jelena Dokić (Russia) Nadia Petrova	(Belgium) Kim Clijsters (United States) Jennifer Capriati	(France) Amélie Mauresmo (France) Nathalie Tauziat (Belgium) Justine Henin (Federal Republic of Yugoslavia) Jelena Dokić
27 Aug; 3 Sep	US Open; New York City, United States; Grand Slam; Hard – $6,628,000 – 128S/128Q/64D/32X; Singles – Doubles – Mixed doubles	(United States) Venus Williams; 6–2, 6–4	(United States) Serena Williams	(Switzerland) Martina Hingis (United States) Jennifer Capriati	(Czech Republic) Dája Bedáňová (United States) Lindsay Davenport (Belgium) Kim Clijsters (France) Amélie Mauresmo
27 Aug; 3 Sep	US Open; New York City, United States; Grand Slam; Hard – $6,628,000 – 128S/128Q/64D/32X; Singles – Doubles – Mixed doubles	(United States) Lisa Raymond (Australia) Rennae Stubbs; 6–2, 5–7, 7–5	(United States) Kimberly Po-Messerli (France) Nathalie Tauziat	(Switzerland) Martina Hingis (United States) Jennifer Capriati	(Czech Republic) Dája Bedáňová (United States) Lindsay Davenport (Belgium) Kim Clijsters (France) Amélie Mauresmo
27 Aug; 3 Sep	US Open; New York City, United States; Grand Slam; Hard – $6,628,000 – 128S/128Q/64D/32X; Singles – Doubles – Mixed doubles	(Australia) Todd Woodbridge (Australia) Rennae Stubbs; 6–4, 5–7, [11–9]	(India) Leander Paes (United States) Lisa Raymond	(Switzerland) Martina Hingis (United States) Jennifer Capriati	(Czech Republic) Dája Bedáňová (United States) Lindsay Davenport (Belgium) Kim Clijsters (France) Amélie Mauresmo

=== September ===
Week	Tournament	Champions	Runners-up	Semifinalists	Quarterfinalists
10 Sep	Brasil Open; Bahia, Brazil; Tier II event Hard – $625,000 – 28S/32Q/16D; Singles – Doubles	(United States) Monica Seles; 6–3, 6–3	(Federal Republic of Yugoslavia) Jelena Dokić	(Slovakia) Henrieta Nagyová (Paraguay) Rossana de los Ríos	(Russia) Tatiana Panova (South Africa) Amanda Coetzer (Italy) Silvia Farina Elia (United States) Samantha Reeves
10 Sep	Brasil Open; Bahia, Brazil; Tier II event Hard – $625,000 – 28S/32Q/16D; Singles – Doubles	(South Africa) Amanda Coetzer (United States) Lori McNeil; 6–7^{(8–10)}, 6–2, 6–4	(United States) Nicole Arendt (Argentina) Patricia Tarabini	(Slovakia) Henrieta Nagyová (Paraguay) Rossana de los Ríos	(Russia) Tatiana Panova (South Africa) Amanda Coetzer (Italy) Silvia Farina Elia (United States) Samantha Reeves
10 Sep	Big Island Championships; Waikoloa, United States; Tier IV event Hard – $140,000 – 32S/19Q/16D; Singles – Doubles	(France) Sandrine Testud; 6–3, 2–0 ret.	(Belgium) Justine Henin	(United States) Lisa Raymond (United States) Marissa Irvin	(United States) Jill Craybas (United States) Lilia Osterloh (United States) Meilen Tu (Russia) Alina Jidkova
10 Sep	Big Island Championships; Waikoloa, United States; Tier IV event Hard – $140,000 – 32S/19Q/16D; Singles – Doubles	(Slovenia) Tina Križan (Slovenia) Katarina Srebotnik; 6–2, 6–3	(Belgium) Els Callens (Australia) Nicole Pratt	(United States) Lisa Raymond (United States) Marissa Irvin	(United States) Jill Craybas (United States) Lilia Osterloh (United States) Meilen Tu (Russia) Alina Jidkova
17 Sep	Toyota Princess Cup; Tokyo, Japan; Tier II event Hard – $565,000 – 28S/32Q/16D; Singles – Doubles	(Federal Republic of Yugoslavia) Jelena Dokić; 6–4, 6–2	(Spain) Arantxa Sánchez Vicario	(Belgium) Kim Clijsters (Spain) Gala León García	(Thailand) Tamarine Tanasugarn (United States) Meilen Tu (France) Sandrine Testud (Japan) Ai Sugiyama
17 Sep	Toyota Princess Cup; Tokyo, Japan; Tier II event Hard – $565,000 – 28S/32Q/16D; Singles – Doubles	(Zimbabwe) Cara Black (South Africa) Liezel Huber; 6–1, 6–3	(Belgium) Kim Clijsters (Japan) Ai Sugiyama	(Belgium) Kim Clijsters (Spain) Gala León García	(Thailand) Tamarine Tanasugarn (United States) Meilen Tu (France) Sandrine Testud (Japan) Ai Sugiyama
17 Sep	Bell Challenge; Quebec City, Canada; Tier III event Carpet (i) – $170,000 – 30S/32Q/16D; Singles – Doubles	(United States) Meghann Shaughnessy; 6–1, 6–3	(Croatia) Iva Majoli	(Luxembourg) Anne Kremer (Slovakia) Martina Suchá	(United States) Alexandra Stevenson (Canada) Jana Nejedly (United States) Jennifer Hopkins (United States) Samantha Reeves
17 Sep	Bell Challenge; Quebec City, Canada; Tier III event Carpet (i) – $170,000 – 30S/32Q/16D; Singles – Doubles	(United States) Samantha Reeves (Italy) Adriana Serra Zanetti; 7–5, 4–6, 6–3	(Czech Republic) Klára Koukalová (Czech Republic) Alena Vašková	(Luxembourg) Anne Kremer (Slovakia) Martina Suchá	(United States) Alexandra Stevenson (Canada) Jana Nejedly (United States) Jennifer Hopkins (United States) Samantha Reeves
24 Sep	Sparkassen Cup; Leipzig, Germany; Tier II event Hard (i) – $565,000 – 28S/32Q/16D; Singles – Doubles	(Belgium) Kim Clijsters; 6–1, 6–1	(Bulgaria) Magdalena Maleeva	(Russia) Elena Dementieva (France) Nathalie Tauziat	(Italy) Silvia Farina Elia (Slovakia) Daniela Hantuchová (Russia) Anastasia Myskina (Luxembourg) Anne Kremer
24 Sep	Sparkassen Cup; Leipzig, Germany; Tier II event Hard (i) – $565,000 – 28S/32Q/16D; Singles – Doubles	(Russia) Elena Likhovtseva (France) Nathalie Tauziat; 6–4, 6–2	(Czech Republic) Květa Hrdličková (Germany) Barbara Rittner	(Russia) Elena Dementieva (France) Nathalie Tauziat	(Italy) Silvia Farina Elia (Slovakia) Daniela Hantuchová (Russia) Anastasia Myskina (Luxembourg) Anne Kremer
24 Sep	Wismilak International; Bali, Indonesia; Tier III event Hard – $170,000 – 30S/26Q/16D; Singles – Doubles	(Indonesia) Angelique Widjaja; 7–6^{(7–2)}, 7–6^{(7–4)}	(South Africa) Joannette Kruger	(Spain) Arantxa Sánchez Vicario (Chinese Taipei) Hsieh Su-wei	(Italy) Rita Grande (Slovenia) Tina Pisnik (Japan) Shinobu Asagoe (Thailand) Tamarine Tanasugarn
24 Sep	Wismilak International; Bali, Indonesia; Tier III event Hard – $170,000 – 30S/26Q/16D; Singles – Doubles	(Australia) Evie Dominikovic (Thailand) Tamarine Tanasugarn; 6–7^{(4–7)}, 6–2, 6–3	(Chinese Taipei) Janet Lee (Indonesia) Wynne Prakusya	(Spain) Arantxa Sánchez Vicario (Chinese Taipei) Hsieh Su-wei	(Italy) Rita Grande (Slovenia) Tina Pisnik (Japan) Shinobu Asagoe (Thailand) Tamarine Tanasugarn

=== October ===
Week	Tournament	Champions	Runners-up	Semifinalists	Quarterfinalists
1 Oct	Kremlin Cup; Moscow, Russia; Tier I event Carpet (i) – $1,185,000 – 28S/32Q/16D; Singles – Doubles	(Federal Republic of Yugoslavia) Jelena Dokić; 6–3, 6–3	(Russia) Elena Dementieva	(Russia) Anastasia Myskina (Italy) Silvia Farina Elia	(Switzerland) Martina Hingis (Austria) Barbara Schett (Italy) Francesca Schiavone (Czech Republic) Dája Bedáňová
1 Oct	Kremlin Cup; Moscow, Russia; Tier I event Carpet (i) – $1,185,000 – 28S/32Q/16D; Singles – Doubles	(Switzerland) Martina Hingis (Russia) Anna Kournikova; 7–6^{(7–1)}, 6–3	(Russia) Elena Dementieva (Russia) Lina Krasnoroutskaya	(Russia) Anastasia Myskina (Italy) Silvia Farina Elia	(Switzerland) Martina Hingis (Austria) Barbara Schett (Italy) Francesca Schiavone (Czech Republic) Dája Bedáňová
1 Oct	AIG Japan Open; Tokyo, Japan; Tier III event Hard – $170,000 – 30S/32Q/16D; Singles – Doubles	(United States) Monica Seles; 6–3, 6–2	(Thailand) Tamarine Tanasugarn	(Japan) Ai Sugiyama (South Africa) Joannette Kruger	(Italy) Rita Grande (New Zealand) Pavlina Nola (Switzerland) Emmanuelle Gagliardi (Japan) Saori Obata
1 Oct	AIG Japan Open; Tokyo, Japan; Tier III event Hard – $170,000 – 30S/32Q/16D; Singles – Doubles	(South Africa) Liezel Huber (Australia) Rachel McQuillan; 6–2, 6–0	(Chinese Taipei) Janet Lee (Indonesia) Wynne Prakusya	(Japan) Ai Sugiyama (South Africa) Joannette Kruger	(Italy) Rita Grande (New Zealand) Pavlina Nola (Switzerland) Emmanuelle Gagliardi (Japan) Saori Obata
8 Oct	Porsche Tennis Grand Prix; Filderstadt, Germany; Tier II event Hard (i) – $565,000 – 28S/32Q/16D; Singles – Doubles	(United States) Lindsay Davenport; 7–5, 6–4	(Belgium) Justine Henin	(Switzerland) Martina Hingis (France) Sandrine Testud	(Russia) Tatiana Panova (France) Amélie Mauresmo (Germany) Anke Huber (United States) Jennifer Capriati
8 Oct	Porsche Tennis Grand Prix; Filderstadt, Germany; Tier II event Hard (i) – $565,000 – 28S/32Q/16D; Singles – Doubles	(United States) Lindsay Davenport (United States) Lisa Raymond; 6–4, 6–7^{(4–7)}, 7–5	(Belgium) Justine Henin (United States) Meghann Shaughnessy	(Switzerland) Martina Hingis (France) Sandrine Testud	(Russia) Tatiana Panova (France) Amélie Mauresmo (Germany) Anke Huber (United States) Jennifer Capriati
8 Oct	Kiwi Open; Shanghai, China; Tier IV event Hard – $140,000 – 32S/30Q/16D; Singles – Doubles	(United States) Monica Seles; 6–2, 6–3	(Australia) Nicole Pratt	(Australia) Alicia Molik (Italy) Rita Grande	(France) Stéphanie Foretz (South Korea) Cho Yoon-jeong (Japan) Ai Sugiyama (Chinese Taipei) Janet Lee
8 Oct	Kiwi Open; Shanghai, China; Tier IV event Hard – $140,000 – 32S/30Q/16D; Singles – Doubles	(South Africa) Liezel Huber (Czech Republic) Lenka Němečková; 6–0, 7–5	(Australia) Evie Dominikovic (Thailand) Tamarine Tanasugarn	(Australia) Alicia Molik (Italy) Rita Grande	(France) Stéphanie Foretz (South Korea) Cho Yoon-jeong (Japan) Ai Sugiyama (Chinese Taipei) Janet Lee
15 Oct	Swisscom Challenge; Zürich, Switzerland; Tier I event Carpet (i) – $1,185,000 – 28S/32Q/16D; Singles – Doubles	(United States) Lindsay Davenport; 6–3, 6–1	(Federal Republic of Yugoslavia) Jelena Dokić	(France) Nathalie Tauziat (United States) Jennifer Capriati	(France) Sandrine Testud (Italy) Silvia Farina Elia (Slovakia) Daniela Hantuchová (Switzerland) Marie-Gayanay Mikaelian
15 Oct	Swisscom Challenge; Zürich, Switzerland; Tier I event Carpet (i) – $1,185,000 – 28S/32Q/16D; Singles – Doubles	(United States) Lindsay Davenport (United States) Lisa Raymond; 6–3, 2–6, 6–2	(France) Sandrine Testud (Italy) Roberta Vinci	(France) Nathalie Tauziat (United States) Jennifer Capriati	(France) Sandrine Testud (Italy) Silvia Farina Elia (Slovakia) Daniela Hantuchová (Switzerland) Marie-Gayanay Mikaelian
15 Oct	EuroTel Slovak Indoors; Bratislava, Slovakia; Tier V event Hard (i) – $110,000 – 32S/32Q/16D; Singles – Doubles	(Italy) Rita Grande; 6–1, 6–1	(Slovakia) Martina Suchá	(Italy) Adriana Serra Zanetti (Slovakia) Ľudmila Cervanová	(United States) Lilia Osterloh (Czech Republic) Květa Hrdličková (Germany) Bianka Lamade (Luxembourg) Anne Kremer
15 Oct	EuroTel Slovak Indoors; Bratislava, Slovakia; Tier V event Hard (i) – $110,000 – 32S/32Q/16D; Singles – Doubles	(Czech Republic) Dája Bedáňová (Russia) Elena Bovina; 6–3, 6–4	(France) Nathalie Dechy (United States) Meilen Tu	(Italy) Adriana Serra Zanetti (Slovakia) Ľudmila Cervanová	(United States) Lilia Osterloh (Czech Republic) Květa Hrdličková (Germany) Bianka Lamade (Luxembourg) Anne Kremer
22 Oct	Generali Ladies Linz; Linz, Austria; Tier II event Hard (i) – $565,000 – 28S/32Q/16D; Singles – Doubles	(United States) Lindsay Davenport; 6–4, 6–1	(Federal Republic of Yugoslavia) Jelena Dokić	(Bulgaria) Magdalena Maleeva (Uzbekistan) Iroda Tulyaganova	(France) Sandrine Testud (United States) Chanda Rubin (United States) Alexandra Stevenson (Russia) Tatiana Panova
22 Oct	Generali Ladies Linz; Linz, Austria; Tier II event Hard (i) – $565,000 – 28S/32Q/16D; Singles – Doubles	(Federal Republic of Yugoslavia) Jelena Dokić (Russia) Nadia Petrova; 6–1, 6–4	(Belgium) Els Callens (United States) Chanda Rubin	(Bulgaria) Magdalena Maleeva (Uzbekistan) Iroda Tulyaganova	(France) Sandrine Testud (United States) Chanda Rubin (United States) Alexandra Stevenson (Russia) Tatiana Panova
22 Oct	SEAT Open; Kockelscheuer, Luxembourg; Tier III event Hard (i) – $170,000 – 30S/32Q/16D; Singles – Doubles	(Belgium) Kim Clijsters; 6–2, 6–2	(United States) Lisa Raymond	(South Africa) Amanda Coetzer (Slovenia) Tina Pisnik	(Russia) Anna Kournikova (Czech Republic) Květa Hrdličková (Germany) Anke Huber (United States) Meilen Tu
22 Oct	SEAT Open; Kockelscheuer, Luxembourg; Tier III event Hard (i) – $170,000 – 30S/32Q/16D; Singles – Doubles	(Russia) Elena Bovina (Slovakia) Daniela Hantuchová; 6–3, 6–3	(Germany) Bianka Lamade (Switzerland) Patty Schnyder	(South Africa) Amanda Coetzer (Slovenia) Tina Pisnik	(Russia) Anna Kournikova (Czech Republic) Květa Hrdličková (Germany) Anke Huber (United States) Meilen Tu
29 Oct	Sanex Championships; Munich, Germany; Year-end Championship; Hard (i) – $3,000,000 – 16S/8D; Singles – Doubles	(United States) Serena Williams; Walkover	(United States) Lindsay Davenport	(France) Sandrine Testud (Belgium) Kim Clijsters	(United States) Jennifer Capriati (Belgium) Justine Henin (Spain) Arantxa Sánchez Vicario (Federal Republic of Yugoslavia) Jelena Dokić
29 Oct	Sanex Championships; Munich, Germany; Year-end Championship; Hard (i) – $3,000,000 – 16S/8D; Singles – Doubles	(United States) Lisa Raymond (Australia) Rennae Stubbs; 7–5, 3–6, 6–3	(Zimbabwe) Cara Black (Russia) Elena Likhovtseva	(France) Sandrine Testud (Belgium) Kim Clijsters	(United States) Jennifer Capriati (Belgium) Justine Henin (Spain) Arantxa Sánchez Vicario (Federal Republic of Yugoslavia) Jelena Dokić

=== November ===
Week	Tournament	Champions	Runners-up	Semifinalists	Quarterfinalists
5 Nov	Volvo Women's Open; Pattaya, Thailand; Tier V event Hard – $110,000 – 32S/25Q/16D; Singles – Doubles	(Switzerland) Patty Schnyder; 6–0, 6–4	(Slovakia) Henrieta Nagyová	(Paraguay) Rossana de los Ríos (Belarus) Tatiana Poutchek	(Chinese Taipei) Hsieh Su-wei (Luxembourg) Anne Kremer (Russia) Tatiana Panova (South Africa) Liezel Huber
5 Nov	Volvo Women's Open; Pattaya, Thailand; Tier V event Hard – $110,000 – 32S/25Q/16D; Singles – Doubles	(Sweden) Åsa Svensson (Uzbekistan) Iroda Tulyaganova; 4–6, 6–3, 6–3	(South Africa) Liezel Huber (Indonesia) Wynne Prakusya	(Paraguay) Rossana de los Ríos (Belarus) Tatiana Poutchek	(Chinese Taipei) Hsieh Su-wei (Luxembourg) Anne Kremer (Russia) Tatiana Panova (South Africa) Liezel Huber
5 Nov	Fed Cup; Madrid, Spain; Clay (i) – 8 teams (RR)	Belgium; 2–1	Russia	Round robin losers (Group A) France; Russia; Czech Republic	Round robin losers (Group B) Spain; Germany; Australia

== Statistics ==
List of players and titles won, last name alphabetically:

- (United States) Lindsay Davenport – Tokyo Pan Pacific, Scottsdale, Eastbourne, Manhattan Beach, Filderstadt, Zurich and Linz (7)
- (United States) Venus Williams – Miami, Hamburg, Wimbledon, San Diego, New Haven and U.S. Open (6)
- (France) Amélie Mauresmo – Paris, Nice, Amelia Island and Berlin (4)
- (United States) Monica Seles – Oklahoma City, Bahia, Tokyo Japan Open and Shanghai (4)
- (United States) Jennifer Capriati – Australian Open, Charleston and French Open (3)
- (Belgium) Kim Clijsters – Stanford, Leipzig and Luxembourg (3)
- (Federal Republic of Yugoslavia) Jelena Dokić – Rome, Tokyo Princess Cup and Moscow (3)
- (Belgium) Justine Henin – Gold Coast, Canberra and 's-Hertogenbosch (3)
- (Switzerland) Martina Hingis – Sydney, Doha and Dubai (3)
- (United States) Serena Williams – Indian Wells, Toronto and Munich Championships (3)
- (Italy) Rita Grande – Hobart and Bratislava (2)
- (Spain) Ángeles Montolio – Estoril and Bol (2)
- (Uzbekistan) Iroda Tulyaganova – Vienna and Knokke-Heist (2)
- (Spain) Arantxa Sánchez Vicario – Porto and Madrid (2)
- (South Africa) Amanda Coetzer – Acapulco (1)
- (Italy) Silvia Farina Elia – Strasbourg (1)
- (Czech Republic) Adriana Gerši – Basel (1)
- (Hungary) Zsófia Gubacsi – Casablanca (1)
- (Germany) Bianka Lamade – Tashkent (1)
- (Bulgaria) Magdalena Maleeva – Budapest (1)
- (Spain) Anabel Medina Garrigues – Palermo (1)
- (Germany) Barbara Rittner – Antwerp (1)
- (Switzerland) Patty Schnyder – Pattaya (1)
- (United States) Meghann Shaughnessy – Quebec City (1)
- (Argentina) Paola Suárez – Bogotá (1)
- (France) Nathalie Tauziat – Birmingham (1)
- (France) Sandrine Testud – Waikoloa (1)
- (Spain) Cristina Torrens Valero – Sopot (1)
- (United States) Meilen Tu – Auckland (1)
- (Indonesia) Angelique Widjaja – Bali (1)

The following players won their first title:

- (United States) Meilen Tu – Auckland
- (Italy) Rita Grande – Hobart
- (Spain) Ángeles Montolio – Estoril
- (Federal Republic of Yugoslavia) Jelena Dokić – Rome
- (Italy) Silvia Farina Elia – Strasbourg
- (Germany) Bianka Lamade – Tashkent
- (Spain) Anabel Medina Garrigues – Palermo
- (Hungary) Zsófia Gubacsi – Casablanca
- (Czech Republic) Adriana Gerši – Basel
- (Indonesia) Angelique Widjaja – Bali

Titles won by nation:

- United States – 25 (Auckland, Australian Open, Tokyo Pan Pacific, Oklahoma City, Scottsdale, Indian Wells, Miami, Charleston, Hamburg, French Open, Eastbourne, Wimbledon, San Diego, Manhattan Beach, Toronto, New Haven, U.S. Open, Bahia, Quebec City, Tokyo Japan Open, Filderstadt, Shanghai, Zurich, Linz and Munich Championships)
- Belgium – 6 (Gold Coast, Canberra, 's-Hertogenbosch, Stanford, Leipzig and Luxembourg)
- France – 6 (Paris, Nice, Amelia Island, Berlin, Birmingham and Waikoloa)
- Spain – 6 (Porto, Estoril, Bol, Madrid, Palermo and Sopot)
- Switzerland – 4 (Sydney, Doha, Dubai and Pattaya)
- Italy – 3 (Hobart, Strasbourg and Bratislava)
- Yugoslavia – 3 (Rome, Tokyo Princess Cup and Moscow)
- Germany – 2 (Antwerp and Tashkent)
- Uzbekistan – 2 (Vienna and Knokke-Heist)
- Argentina – 1 (Bogotá)
- Bulgaria – 1 (Budapest)
- Czech Republic – 1 (Basel)
- Hungary – 1 (Casablanca)
- Indonesia – 1 (Indonesia)
- South Africa – 1 (Acapulco)

== Rankings ==
Below are the 2001 WTA year-end rankings in both singles and doubles competition:

Singles Year-end Ranking
No	Player Name	Nation	Points	2000	Change
1	Lindsay Davenport	USA	4,902	2	+1
2	Jennifer Capriati	USA	4,892	14	+12
3	Venus Williams	USA	4,128	3	=
4	Martina Hingis	SUI	3,944	1	-3
5	Kim Clijsters	BEL	3,265	18	+13
6	Serena Williams	USA	3,004	6	=
7	Justine Henin	BEL	2,989	48	+41
8	Jelena Dokić	YUG	2,780	26	+18
9	Amélie Mauresmo	FRA	2,765	16	+7
10	Monica Seles	USA	2,306	4	-6
11	Sandrine Testud	FRA	2,056	17	+6
12	Meghann Shaughnessy	USA	1,833	39	+27
13	Nathalie Tauziat	FRA	1,754	10	-3
14	Silvia Farina Elia	ITA	1,738	63	+49
15	Elena Dementieva	RUS	1,576	11	-4
16	Magdalena Maleeva	BUL	1,571	22	+6
17	Arantxa Sánchez Vicario	ESP	1,548	8	-9
18	Anke Huber	GER	1,444	19	+1
19	Amanda Coetzer	RSA	1,426	12	-7
20	Iroda Tulyaganova	UZB	1,295	75	+55

Doubles Year-end Ranking
No	Player Name	Nation	Points	2000	Change
1	Lisa Raymond	USA	4,098	5	+4
2	Rennae Stubbs	AUS	3,712	5	+3
3	Cara Black	ZIM	2,614	14	+11
4	Elena Likhovtseva	RUS	2,605	18	+14
5	Nathalie Tauziat	FRA	2,535	9	+4
6	Paola Suárez	ARG	2,512	7	+1
7	Kimberly Po-Messerli	USA	2,364	20	+13
8	Virginia Ruano Pascual	ESP	2,344	10	+2
9	Ai Sugiyama	JPN	2,018	1	-8
10	Nicole Arendt	USA	1,796	11	+1
11	Arantxa Sánchez Vicario	ESP	1,790	16	+5
12	Jelena Dokić	YUG	1,710	50	+38
13	Sandrine Testud	FRA	1,578	22	+9
14	Meghann Shaughnessy	USA	1,476	35	+21
15	Kim Clijsters	BEL	1,357	47	+32
16	Els Callens	BEL	1,335	15	-1
17	Amanda Coetzer	RSA	1,312	26	+9
18	Barbara Schett	AUT	1,293	13	-5
19	Conchita Martínez	ESP	1,265	27	+8
20	Katarina Srebotnik	SLO	1,256	34	+14

=== Points distribution ===
Category	W	F	SF	QF	R16	R32	R64	R128	Q	Q3	Q2	Q1
Grand Slam (S)	520	364	234	130	72	44	26	2	22	18	10	2
Grand Slam (D)	520	364	234	130	72	44	2	–	17	–	–	–
WTA Championships (S)	390	273	175	97	54	–	–	–	–	–	–	–
WTA Championships (D)	390	273	175	97	–	–	–	–	–	–	–	–
Tier I (96S)	260	182	117	65	36	22	13	1	9	–	5	1
Tier I (56S)	260	182	117	65	36	22	1	–	9	–	5	1
Tier I (28S)	260	182	117	65	36	1	–	–	16	9	5	1
Tier I (28/32D)	260	182	117	65	36	1	–	–	16	–	–	–
Tier I (16D)	260	182	117	65	1	–	–	–	16	–	–	–
Tier II (56S)	200	140	90	50	26	14	1	–	7	–	4	1
Tier II (28S)	200	140	90	50	26	1	–	–	12	7	4	1
Tier II (16D)	200	140	90	50	1	–	–	–	12	–	–	–
Tier III (56S)	155	110	71	39	20	11	1	–	5	–	3	1
Tier III (30S)	155	110	71	39	20	1	–	–	9	5	3	1
Tier III (16D)	155	110	71	39	1	–	–	–	10	–	–	–
Tier IV (S)	140	98	63	35	18	1	–	–	8	5	3	1
Tier IV (D)	140	98	63	35	1	–	–	–	9	–	–	–
Tier V (S)	80	56	36	20	10	1	–	–	4.5	3	2	1
Tier V (D)	80	56	36	20	1	–	–	–	5	–	–	–

== See also ==
- 2001 ATP Tour
- WTA Tour
- List of female tennis players
- List of tennis tournaments
