= 1999 Wismilak International – Singles =

Singles
- 1999 Wismilak International

Final
- Champion: (Sweden) Åsa Carlsson
- Runner-up: (United States) Erika deLone
- Score: 6–2, 6–4

Details
- Draw: 30
- Seeds: 8

Events
Singles	Doubles
← 1998 ·	Wismilak International	· 2000 →

The 1999 Wismilak International singles was the singles event of the fifth edition of the most prestigious women's tennis tournament held in Southeast Asia. It was not played the previous year, so there was no defending champion.

Swede Åsa Carlsson won in the final, 6–2, 6–4, against Erika deLone, to win her first WTA title.

== Seeds ==
1. (France) Sarah Pitkowski (second round)
2. (Austria) Sylvia Plischke (second round)
3. (Croatia) Silvija Talaja (second round)
4. (Luxembourg) Anne Kremer (first round)
5. (Russia) Tatiana Panova (first round)
6. (Puerto Rico) Kristina Brandi (quarterfinals)
7. (Australia) Nicole Pratt (second round)
8. (Slovenia) Katarina Srebotnik (first round)

== Draw ==
=== Key ===
- Q = Qualifier
- WC = Wild card
- LL = Lucky loser
- Alt = Alternate
- SE = Special exempt
- PR = Protected ranking
- ITF = ITF entry
- JE = Junior exempt
- w/o = Walkover
- r = Retired
- d = Defaulted
- SR = Special ranking

=== Finals ===
Semifinals
(Sweden) Åsa Carlsson	7^{7}	7
WC	(South Africa) Joannette Kruger	6^{5}	5
(United States) Erika deLone	6	6
(Italy) Rita Grande	2	3

Final
(Sweden) Åsa Carlsson	6	6
(United States) Erika deLone	2	4

=== Top half ===
First round
(Russia) A Myskina	6	7
(Czech Republic) A Gerši	3	5
(Sweden) Å Carlsson	6	6
Q	(Australia) A Ellwood	2	4
WC	(Indonesia) W Prakusya	6	7
8	(Slovenia) K Srebotnik	3	5
3	(Croatia) S Talaja	7^{7}	6
Q	(Hungary) K Marosi	6^{3}	1
WC	(South Africa) J Kruger	6	4	6
(France) É Loit	3	6	4
(Belarus) O Barabanschikova	4	6	6
(Austria) P Wartusch	6	2	3
WC	(Slovenia) T Križan	2	6^{4}
6	(Puerto Rico) K Brandi	6	7^{7}

Second round
1	(France) S Pitkowski	6	1	5
(Russia) A Myskina	2	6	7
(Sweden) Å Carlsson	6	6
WC	(Indonesia) W Prakusya	3	0
3	(Croatia) S Talaja	7	3	0
WC	(South Africa) J Kruger	5	6	6
(Belarus) O Barabanschikova	6	3	4
6	(Puerto Rico) K Brandi	1	6	6

Quarterfinals
(Russia) A Myskina	7^{9}	1	1
(Sweden) Å Carlsson	6^{7}	6	6
WC	(South Africa) J Kruger	5	6	6
6	(Puerto Rico) K Brandi	7	4	1

Semifinals
(Sweden) Å Carlsson	7^{7}	7
WC	(South Africa) J Kruger	6^{5}	5

=== Bottom half ===
First round
5	(Russia) T Panova	1	3
(Belgium) L Courtois	6	6
Q	(Croatia) J Kostanić	4	6	3
(France) A Cocheteux	6	1	6
(Australia) A Molik	6	4	6
(Hungary) P Mandula	4	6	3
(United States) E deLone	6	2
4	(Luxembourg) A Kremer	2	1^{r}
7	(Australia) N Pratt	7^{7}	6
(Poland) M Grzybowska	6^{4}	4
(Thailand) T Tanasugarn	7^{7}	6
Q	(Chinese Taipei) J Lee	6^{4}	4
(Slovenia) T Pisnik	6	5	5
(Italy) R Grande	1	7	7

Second round
(Belgium) L Courtois	6^{3}	6^{4}
(France) A Cocheteux	7^{7}	7^{7}
(Australia) A Molik	3	4
(United States) E deLone	6	6
7	(Australia) N Pratt	3	6	5
(Thailand) T Tanasugarn	6	4	7
(Italy) R Grande	6	6
2	(Austria) S Plischke	1	3

Quarterfinals
(France) A Cocheteux	1	0
(United States) E deLone	6	6
(Thailand) T Tanasugarn	6	2	3
(Italy) R Grande	0	6	6

Semifinals
(United States) E deLone	6	6
(Italy) R Grande	2	3

== Qualifying ==
=== Seeds ===
1. (Bulgaria) Magdalena Maleeva (second round)
2. (Japan) Yuka Yoshida (second round)
3. (Slovakia) Ľudmila Cervanová (second round)
4. (Croatia) Jelena Kostanić (Qualifier)
5. (Switzerland) Miroslava Vavrinec (first round)
6. (Chinese Taipei) Janet Lee (Qualifier)
7. (Australia) Annabel Ellwood (Qualifier)
8. (Italy) Tathiana Garbin (first round)

=== Qualifiers ===
1. (Australia) Annabel Ellwood
2. (Hungary) Katalin Marosi
3. (Croatia) Jelena Kostanić
4. (Chinese Taipei) Janet Lee

== Qualifying draw ==
=== Key ===
- Q = Qualifier
- WC = Wild card
- LL = Lucky loser
- Alt = Alternate
- SE = Special exempt
- PR = Protected ranking
- ITF = ITF entry
- JE = Junior exempt
- w/o = Walkover
- r = Retired
- d = Defaulted
- SR = Special ranking

=== First qualifier ===
First round
1	(Bulgaria) Magdalena Maleeva	6	6
(Belgium) Daphne van de Zande	4	1
Alt	(Australia) Mireille Dittmann	3	6	2
(India) Nirupama Vaidyanathan	6	4	6
(Austria) Marion Maruska	4	6	7
(China) Yi Jing-Qian	6	0	5
(Uzbekistan) Iroda Tulyaganova	6^{4}	6	4
7	(Australia) Annabel Ellwood	7^{7}	3	6

Second round
1	(Bulgaria) Magdalena Maleeva	6	4	4
(India) Nirupama Vaidyanathan	4	6	6
(Austria) Marion Maruska	1	0^{r}
7	(Australia) Annabel Ellwood	6	1

Qualifying competition
(India) Nirupama Vaidyanathan	1	5
7	(Australia) Annabel Ellwood	6	7

=== Second qualifier ===
First round
3	(Slovakia) Ľudmila Cervanová	5	6	6
WC	(Japan) Riei Otakeyama	7	2	1
(Romania) Raluca Sandu	6	6
(Hungary) Virág Csurgó	3	2
(Romania) Andreea Vanc	1	3
(Hungary) Zsófia Gubacsi	6	6
(Hungary) Katalin Marosi	6	6
5	(Switzerland) Miroslava Vavrinec	3	3

Second round
3	(Slovakia) Ľudmila Cervanová	4	4
(Romania) Raluca Sandu	6	6
(Hungary) Zsófia Gubacsi	1	3
(Hungary) Katalin Marosi	6	6

Qualifying competition
(Romania) Raluca Sandu	0	5
(Hungary) Katalin Marosi	6	7

=== Third qualifier ===
First round
8	(Italy) Tathiana Garbin	3	3
(Japan) Rika Hiraki	6	6
(Slovakia) Martina Suchá	6	6^{7}	6
(France) Stéphanie Foretz	4	7^{9}	4
(Austria) Evelyn Fauth	1	6	4
WC	(United States) Julie Scott	6	1	6
Alt	(Japan) Yoshiko Sasano	1	1
4	(Croatia) Jelena Kostanić	6	6

Second round
(Japan) Rika Hiraki	3	4
(Slovakia) Martina Suchá	6	6
WC	(United States) Julie Scott	2	4
4	(Croatia) Jelena Kostanić	6	6

Qualifying competition
(Slovakia) Martina Suchá	3	3
(Croatia) Jelena Kostanić	6	6

=== Fourth qualifier ===
First round
6	(Chinese Taipei) Janet Lee	6	6
WC	(Indonesia) Wukirasih Sawondari	3	3
(South Korea) Cho Yoon-jeong	6	6
WC	(Thailand) Benjamas Sangaram	4	1
(United States) Holly Parkinson	6^{8}	6	6
Alt	(United States) Wendy Fix	7^{10}	1	3
(United States) Brandis Braverman	1	1
2	(Japan) Yuka Yoshida	6	6

Second round
(Chinese Taipei) Janet Lee	7	2	6
(South Korea) Cho Yoon-jeong	5	6	3
(United States) Holly Parkinson	7	6
2	(Japan) Yuka Yoshida	5	3

Qualifying competition
(Chinese Taipei) Janet Lee	4	7	6
(United States) Holly Parkinson	6	5	4
