= 1999 Wismilak International – Doubles =

Doubles
- 1999 Wismilak International

Final
- Champions: (Croatia) Jelena Kostanić (Slovenia) Tina Pisnik
- Runners-up: (Japan) Rika Hiraki (Japan) Yuka Yoshida
- Score: 3–6, 6–2, 6–4

Details
- Draw: 16
- Seeds: 4

Events
| Singles | Doubles |
| ← 1997 · | Wismilak International | · 2000 → |

The 1999 Wismilak International doubles was the doubles event of the fifth edition of the most prestigious women's tennis tournament held in Southeast Asia. It was not played the previous year, so there was no defending champion.

Jelena Kostanić and Tina Pisnik won in the final, 3–6, 6–2, 6–4, against Japanese Rika Hiraki and Yuka Yoshida, to win their respective second and first WTA Tour titles.

== Seeds ==
1. (Slovenia) Tina Križan / (Austria) Patricia Wartusch (first round)
2. (Belgium) Laurence Courtois / (Australia) Alicia Molik (semifinals)
3. (Japan) Rika Hiraki / (Japan) Yuka Yoshida (final)
4. (Croatia) Jelena Kostanić / (Slovenia) Tina Pisnik (champions)

== Draw ==
=== Key ===
- Q = Qualifier
- WC = Wild card
- LL = Lucky loser
- Alt = Alternate
- SE = Special exempt
- PR = Protected ranking
- ITF = ITF entry
- JE = Junior exempt
- w/o = Walkover
- r = Retired
- d = Defaulted
- SR = Special ranking

First round
1 | (Slovenia) T Križan (Austria) P Wartusch | 1 | 2
(United States) W Fix (United States) J Scott | 6 | 6
WC | (Russia) A Myskina (France) S Pitkowski | 3 | 7 | 6
(South Korea) Y-j Cho (Czech Republic) M Maštalířová | 6 | 5 | 3
3 | (Japan) R Hiraki (Japan) Y Yoshida | 6 | 6
Q | (Austria) E Fauth (Switzerland) M Vavrinec | 2 | 3
(France) A Cocheteux (Slovakia) J Husárová | 6 | 6
(Belarus) O Barabanschikova (Australia) N Pratt | 2 | 3
(United States) H Parkinson (India) N Vaidyanathan | 6 | 4 | 5
(Italy) R Grande (Austria) S Plischke | 2 | 6 | 7
(Germany) C Schneider (Croatia) S Talaja | 6^{2} | 7^{9} | 1
4 | (Croatia) J Kostanić (Slovenia) T Pisnik | 7^{7} | 6^{7} | 6
(Italy) T Garbin (Romania) A Vanc | 6 | 6
(Poland) M Grzybowska (Thailand) T Tanasugarn | 0 | 1
(Hungary) V Csurgó (Hungary) K Marosi | 2 | 1
2 | (Belgium) L Courtois (Australia) A Molik | 6 | 6

Quarterfinals
(United States) W Fix (United States) J Scott | 7 | 3 | 0
WC | (Russia) A Myskina (France) S Pitkowski | 5 | 6 | 6
3 | (Japan) R Hiraki (Japan) Y Yoshida | 6 | 7^{7}
(France) A Cocheteux (Slovakia) J Husárová | 2 | 6^{1}
(Italy) R Grande (Austria) S Plischke | 6^{1} | 4
4 | (Croatia) J Kostanić (Slovenia) T Pisnik | 7^{7} | 6
(Italy) T Garbin (Romania) A Vanc | 2 | 7^{9} | 2
2 | (Belgium) L Courtois (Australia) A Molik | 6 | 6^{7} | 6

Semifinals
WC | (Russia) A Myskina (France) S Pitkowski | 2 | 3
3 | (Japan) R Hiraki (Japan) Y Yoshida | 6 | 6
4 | (Croatia) J Kostanić (Slovenia) T Pisnik | 0 | 7^{7} | 7
2 | (Belgium) L Courtois (Australia) A Molik | 6 | 6^{3} | 5

Final
3 | (Japan) R Hiraki (Japan) Y Yoshida | 6 | 2 | 4
4 | (Croatia) J Kostanić (Slovenia) T Pisnik | 3 | 6 | 6

== Qualifying ==
=== Seeds ===
1. (South Korea) Cho Yoon-jeong / (Czech Republic) Monika Maštalířová (qualifying competition)
2. (Romania) Raluca Sandu / (Uzbekistan) Iroda Tulyaganova (first round)

=== Qualifiers ===
1. (Austria) Evelyn Fauth / (Switzerland) Miroslava Vavrinec

== Qualifying draw ==
=== Key ===
- Q = Qualifier
- WC = Wild card
- LL = Lucky loser
- Alt = Alternate
- SE = Special exempt
- PR = Protected ranking
- ITF = ITF entry
- JE = Junior exempt
- w/o = Walkover
- r = Retired
- d = Defaulted
- SR = Special ranking

First round
1 | (South Korea) Cho Yoon-jeong (Czech Republic) Monika Maštalířová | 9
(Indonesia) Wukirasih Sawondari (Belgium) Daphne van de Zande | 8
(Japan) Riei Otakeyama (Japan) Yoshiko Sasano | 5
(Indonesia) Wynne Prakusya (Thailand) Benjamas Sangaram | 8
(Chinese Taipei) Chen Yu-an (Chinese Taipei) Weng Tzu-ting | 3
(Luxembourg) Anne Kremer (South Africa) Joannette Kruger | 8
(Austria) Evelyn Fauth (Switzerland) Miroslava Vavrinec | 8
2 | (Romania) Raluca Sandu (Uzbekistan) Iroda Tulyaganova | 1

Second round
1 | (South Korea) Cho Yoon-jeong (Czech Republic) Monika Maštalířová | 8
(Indonesia) Wynne Prakusya (Thailand) Benjamas Sangaram | 2
(Luxembourg) Anne Kremer (South Africa) Joannette Kruger | 7
(Austria) Evelyn Fauth (Switzerland) Miroslava Vavrinec | 9

Qualifying competition
1 | (South Korea) Cho Yoon-jeong (Czech Republic) Monika Maštalířová | 6
(Austria) Evelyn Fauth (Switzerland) Miroslava Vavrinec | 8
