= 2001 Wismilak International – Doubles =

Doubles
- 2001 Wismilak International

Final
- Champions: (Australia) Evie Dominikovic (Thailand) Tamarine Tanasugarn
- Runners-up: (Chinese Taipei) Janet Lee (Indonesia) Wynne Prakusya
- Score: 6–7^{(4–7)}, 6–2, 6–3

Events
Singles	Doubles
← 2000 ·	Wismilak International	· 2002 →

Henrieta Nagyová and Sylvia Plischke were the defending champions, but none competed this year. Nagyová chose to compete at Leipzig during the same week.

Evie Dominikovic and Tamarine Tanasugarn won the title by defeating Janet Lee and Wynne Prakusya 6–7^{(4–7)}, 6–2, 6–3 in the final.

== Seeds ==
1. (France) Alexandra Fusai / (Italy) Rita Grande (first round)
2. (Chinese Taipei) Janet Lee / (Indonesia) Wynne Prakusya (final)
3. (Indonesia) Yayuk Basuki / (Spain) Arantxa Sánchez Vicario (semifinals)
4. (South Africa) Liezel Huber / (Australia) Rachel McQuillan (first round)

== Draw ==
=== Key ===
- Q = Qualifier
- WC = Wild card
- LL = Lucky loser
- Alt = Alternate
- SE = Special exempt
- PR = Protected ranking
- ITF = ITF entry
- JE = Junior exempt
- w/o = Walkover
- r = Retired
- d = Defaulted
- SR = Special ranking

=== Draw ===
First round
1	(France) A Fusai (Italy) R Grande	7^{7}	5	1
(Australia) E Dominikovic (Thailand) T Tanasugarn	6^{4}	7	6
(Australia) M Dittmann (Japan) Keiko Tameishi	w/o
(South Korea) Y-j Cho (South Korea) M-r Jeon
4	(South Africa) L Huber (Australia) R McQuillan	6	1	6^{3}
(Switzerland) E Gagliardi (United States) M Tu	3	6	7^{7}
(United States) T Almeda-Singian (Indonesia) A Widjaja	4
(Paraguay) R de los Ríos (South Africa) J Kruger	0^{r}
(Argentina) M Díaz Oliva (Germany) M Weingärtner	7	6
WC	(Chinese Taipei) S-w Hsieh (Indonesia) R Tedjakusuma	5	4
(Australia) A Ellwood (Japan) H Inoue	1	4
3	(Indonesia) Y Basuki (Spain) A Sánchez Vicario	6	6
Q	(China) N Liu (China) JQ Yi	2	2
(Australia) A Molik (Australia) N Pratt	6	6
(Japan) S Asagoe (Slovenia) T Pisnik	4	7^{7}	2
2	(Chinese Taipei) J Lee (Indonesia) W Prakusya	6	6^{2}	6

Quarterfinals
(Australia) E Dominikovic (Thailand) T Tanasugarn	6	6
(Australia) M Dittmann (Japan) Keiko Tameishi	2	1
(Switzerland) E Gagliardi (United States) M Tu	6	6
(United States) T Almeda-Singian (Indonesia) A Widjaja	2	2
(Argentina) M Díaz Oliva (Germany) M Weingärtner
3	(Indonesia) Y Basuki (Spain) A Sánchez Vicario	w/o
(Australia) A Molik (Australia) N Pratt
2	(Chinese Taipei) J Lee (Indonesia) W Prakusya	w/o

Semifinals
(Australia) E Dominikovic (Thailand) T Tanasugarn	6^{4}	6	6
(Switzerland) E Gagliardi (United States) M Tu	7^{7}	3	4
3	(Indonesia) Y Basuki (Spain) A Sánchez Vicario	2	3
2	(Chinese Taipei) J Lee (Indonesia) W Prakusya	6	6

Final
(Australia) E Dominikovic (Thailand) T Tanasugarn	6^{4}	6	6
2	(Chinese Taipei) J Lee (Indonesia) W Prakusya	7^{7}	2	3
