= 2001 Wismilak International =

Tennis tournament in Bali, Indonesia

- Date: 24–30 September
- Edition: 7th
- Category: Tier III
- Draw: 30S / 16D
- Prize money: $170,000
- Surface: Hard / outdoor
- Location: Bali, Indonesia

Champions

Singles
- (Indonesia) Angelique Widjaja

Doubles
- (Australia) Evie Dominikovic / (Thailand) Tamarine Tanasugarn
- Wismilak International

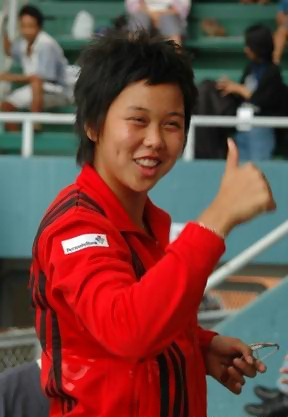
Indonesian tennis player Angelique Widjaja

The 2001 Wismilak International was a women's tennis tournament played on outdoor hard courts in Bali, Indonesia that was part of the Tier III category of the 2001 WTA Tour. It was the seventh edition of the tournament and was held from 24 September through 30 September 2001. Unseeded Angelique Widjaja, who played her first WTA tour event and entered on a wildcard, won the singles title and earned $27,000 first-prize money.

== Finals ==
=== Singles ===
(Indonesia) Angelique Widjaja defeated (South Africa) Joannette Kruger, 7–6^{(7–2)}, 7–6^{(7–4)}

- It was Widjaja's first singles title of her career.

=== Doubles ===
(Australia) Evie Dominikovic / (Thailand) Tamarine Tanasugarn defeated (Chinese Taipei) Janet Lee / (Indonesia) Wynne Prakusya, 6–7^{(4–7)}, 6–2, 6–3
