= 1999 Wismilak International =

- Date: 8–14 November
- Edition: 5th
- Category: Tier III
- Draw: 30S / 16D
- Prize money: $180,000
- Surface: Hard / outdoor
- Location: Kuala Lumpur, Malaysia

Champions

Singles
- (Sweden) Åsa Carlsson

Doubles
- (Croatia) Jelena Kostanić / (Slovenia) Tina Pisnik
← 1997 ·	Wismilak International	· 2000 →

The 1999 Wismilak International was a women's tennis tournament played on outdoor hard courts in Kuala Lumpur, Malaysia that was part of the Tier III category of the 1999 WTA Tour. It was the fifth edition of the tournament and was held from 8 November through 14 November 1999. Unseeded Åsa Carlsson won the singles title and earned $27,000 first-prize money.

== Finals ==
=== Singles ===
(Sweden) Åsa Carlsson defeated (United States) Erika deLone, 6–2, 6–4

- This was Carlsson's first WTA title of her career.

=== Doubles ===
(Croatia) Jelena Kostanić / (Slovenia) Tina Pisnik defeated (Japan) Rika Hiraki / (Japan) Yuka Yoshida, 3–6, 6–2, 6–4

== Entrants ==
=== Seeds ===
Country	Player	Rank	Seed
FRA	Sarah Pitkowski	33	1
AUT	Sylvia Plischke	36	2
CRO	Silvija Talaja	31	3
LUX	Anne Kremer	39	4
RUS	Tatiana Panova	44	5
PUR	Kristina Brandi	56	6
AUS	Nicole Pratt	58	7
SLO	Katarina Srebotnik	62	8

=== Other entrants ===
The following players received wildcards into the singles main draw:

- (Indonesia) Wynne Prakusya
- (South Africa) Joannette Kruger
- (Slovenia) Tina Križan

The following players received wildcards into the doubles main draw:

- (Russia) Anastasia Myskina / (France) Sarah Pitkowski

The following players received entry from the singles qualifying draw:

- (Australia) Annabel Ellwood
- (Hungary) Katalin Marosi
- (Croatia) Jelena Kostanić
- (Chinese Taipei) Janet Lee

The following players received entry from the doubles qualifying draw:

- (Austria) Evelyn Fauth / (Switzerland) Miroslava Vavrinec
