= 2001 Acura Classic – Singles =

Singles
- 2001 Acura Classic

Final
- Champion: (United States) Venus Williams
- Runner-up: (United States) Monica Seles
- Score: 6–2, 6–3

Details
- Draw: 48
- Seeds: 16

Events
Singles	Doubles
- Southern California Open

Venus Williams was the defending champion and successfully defended her title, by defeating Monica Seles 6–2, 6–3 in the final.

== Seeds ==
All seeds received a bye into the second round.

1. (Switzerland) Martina Hingis (semifinals)
2. (United States) Venus Williams (champion)
3. (United States) Jennifer Capriati (quarterfinals)
4. (United States) Lindsay Davenport (semifinals)
5. (Belgium) Kim Clijsters (second round)
6. (France) Nathalie Tauziat (quarterfinals)
7. (United States) Monica Seles (final)
8. (Russia) Elena Dementieva (third round)
9. (Russia) Anna Kournikova (second round)
10. (Bulgaria) Magdalena Maleeva (third round)
11. (United States) Meghann Shaughnessy (third round)
12. (France) Sandrine Testud (quarterfinals)
13. (Spain) Arantxa Sánchez Vicario (second round)
14. (United States) Amy Frazier (second round)
15. (Federal Republic of Yugoslavia) Jelena Dokic (third round)
16. (Austria) Barbara Schett (third round)

== Draw ==
Key

- Q = Qualifier
- WC = Wild card
- LL = Lucky loser
- Alt = Alternate
- ITF = ITF entry
- PR = Protected ranking
- SR = Special ranking
- SE = Special exempt
- JE = Junior exempt
- JR = Junior Accelerator Programme entrant
- CO = College Accelerator Programme entrant
- NG = Next Gen Accelerator Program entrant
- w/o = Walkover
- r = Retired
- d = Defaulted

=== Finals ===
Quarterfinals
1	(Switzerland) Martina Hingis	6	6
(Japan) Ai Sugiyama	3	4
3	(United States) Jennifer Capriati	3	3
7	(United States) Monica Seles	6	6
12	(France) Sandrine Testud	2	7	6^{5}
4	(United States) Lindsay Davenport	6	5	7^{7}
6	(France) Nathalie Tauziat	2	2
2	(United States) Venus Williams	6	6

Semifinals
1	(Switzerland) Martina Hingis	3	4
7	(United States) Monica Seles	6	6
4	(United States) Lindsay Davenport	2	5
2	(United States) Venus Williams	6	7

Final
7	(United States) Monica Seles	2	3
2	(United States) Venus Williams	6	6

=== Top half ===
==== Section 1 ====
First round
LL	(France) V Razzano	6	2	0
(United States) L Osterloh	3	6	6
Q	(United States) A Stevenson	7^{7}	6
(United States) K Brandi	6^{5}	0
(Australia) N Pratt	6	6
(New Zealand) P Nola	3	2
(Thailand) T Tanasugarn	6	6^{3}	2
(Japan) A Sugiyama	4	7^{7}	6

Second round
1	(Switzerland) M Hingis	6	6
(United States) L Osterloh	1	4
Q	(United States) A Stevenson	6	5	6
14	(United States) A Frazier	1	7	4
9	(Russia) A Kournikova	7^{7}	1	3
(Australia) N Pratt	6^{1}	6	6
(Japan) A Sugiyama	6	6
5	(Belgium) K Clijsters	3	3

Third round
1	(Switzerland) M Hingis	6	6
Q	(United States) A Stevenson	1	3
(Australia) N Pratt	3	1^{r}
(Japan) A Sugiyama	6	4

Quarterfinals
1	(Switzerland) M Hingis	6	6
(Japan) A Sugiyama	3	4

==== Section 2 ====
First round
(Japan) S Asagoe	6	6
(France) A-G Sidot	2	3
(Slovakia) J Husárová	4	4
(Germany) J Kandarr	6	6
(Zimbabwe) C Black	2	1
(Luxembourg) A Kremer	6	6
(Australia) E Dominikovic	7^{7}	7
Q	(Tunisia) S Sfar	6^{5}	5

Second round
3	(United States) J Capriati	6	6
(Japan) S Asagoe	1	1
(Germany) J Kandarr	6^{1}	5
15	(Federal Republic of Yugoslavia) J Dokic	7^{7}	7
11	(United States) M Shaughnessy	6^{4}	6	6
(Luxembourg) A Kremer	7^{7}	2	1
(Australia) E Dominikovic	3	4
7	(United States) M Seles	6	6

Third round
3	(United States) J Capriati	6	6
15	(Federal Republic of Yugoslavia) J Dokic	4	2
11	(United States) M Shaughnessy	4	1
7	(United States) M Seles	6	6

Quarterfinals
3	(United States) J Capriati	3	3
7	(United States) M Seles	6	6

=== Bottom half ===
==== Section 3 ====
First round
(Germany) M Weingärtner	7^{7}	1	7^{7}
(Uzbekistan) I Tulyaganova	6^{4}	6	6^{2}
(Italy) R Grande	3	6	6
(United States) M Tu	6	3	2
(Russia) T Panova	0	3
(United States) C Rubin	6	6
WC	(United States) Kim Anh Nguyen	2	3
Q	(United States) S Cacic	6	6

Second round
8	(Russia) E Dementieva	6	6
(Germany) M Weingärtner	3	3
(Italy) R Grande	4	5
12	(France) S Testud	6	7
16	(Austria) B Schett	7^{7}	6
(United States) C Rubin	6^{4}	4
Q	(United States) S Cacic	3	3
4	(United States) L Davenport	6	6

Third round
8	(Russia) E Dementieva	2	4
12	(France) S Testud	6	6
16	(Austria) B Schett	1	5
4	(United States) L Davenport	6	7

Quarterfinals
12	(France) S Testud	2	7	6^{5}
4	(United States) L Davenport	6	5	7^{7}

==== Section 4 ====
First round
(Russia) N Petrova	5
(Italy) T Garbin	2^{r}
Q	(United States) J Hopkins	6	1	4
WC	(United States) A Bradshaw	1	6	6
(Czech Republic) D Bedáňová	6	6
WC	(France) A Fusai	0	2
(Russia) E Likhovtseva	5	3^{r}
(Russia) E Bovina	7	5

Second round
6	(France) N Tauziat	7^{7}	7^{7}
(Russia) N Petrova	6^{4}	6^{5}
WC	(United States) A Bradshaw	1	5
10	(Bulgaria) M Maleeva	6	7
13	(Spain) A Sánchez Vicario	1	4
(Czech Republic) D Bedáňová	6	6
(Russia) E Bovina	1	2
2	(United States) V Williams	6	6

Third round
6	(France) N Tauziat	6	5	6
10	(Bulgaria) M Maleeva	2	7	2
(Czech Republic) D Bedáňová	1	3
2	(United States) V Williams	6	6

Quarterfinals
6	(France) N Tauziat	2	2
2	(United States) V Williams	6	6
