= 2001 Wismilak International – Singles =

Singles
- 2001 Wismilak International

Final
- Champion: (Indonesia) Angelique Widjaja
- Runner-up: (South Africa) Joannette Kruger
- Score: 7–6^{(7–2)}, 7–6^{(7–4)}

Details
- Draw: 30
- Seeds: 8

Events
Singles	Doubles
- Wismilak International

Henrieta Nagyová was the defending champion, but decided to play in the Sparkassen Cup instead.

Angelique Widjaja won the title in her first WTA tournament she was playing in, becoming the lowest ranked player ever to win a WTA title since the computerized rankings began in 1975.

== Draw ==
=== Seeds ===
1. (Spain) Arantxa Sánchez Vicario (semifinals)
2. (Thailand) Tamarine Tanasugarn (quarterfinals)
3. (Germany) Marlene Weingärtner (first round)
4. (United States) ~~Meilen Tu~~ (withdrew)
5. (Italy) Rita Grande (quarterfinals)
6. (Argentina) Mariana Díaz Oliva (first round)
7. (Paraguay) Rossana de los Ríos (first round)
8. (South Africa) Joannette Kruger (final)

Key

- Q = Qualifier
- WC = Wild card
- LL = Lucky loser
- Alt = Alternate
- ITF = ITF entry
- PR = Protected ranking
- SR = Special ranking
- SE = Special exempt
- JE = Junior exempt
- JR = Junior Accelerator Programme entrant
- CO = College Accelerator Programme entrant
- NG = Next Gen Accelerator Program entrant
- w/o = Walkover
- r = Retired
- d = Defaulted

=== Final ===
Semifinals
1	(Spain) Arantxa Sánchez Vicario	2	6	3
8	(South Africa) Joannette Kruger	6	4	6
Q	(Chinese Taipei) Hsieh Su-wei	4	6	6^{3}
WC	(Indonesia) Angelique Widjaja	6	4	7

Final
8	(South Africa) Joannette Kruger	6^{2}	6^{4}
WC	(Indonesia) Angelique Widjaja	7	7

=== Section 1 ===
First round
(Slovakia) Ľ Cervanová	1	7	4
(Chinese Taipei) J Lee	6	6^{4}	6
(China) J-Q Yi	0	6	7
(Australia) N Pratt	6	3	5
(South Korea) Y-J Cho	4	3
5	(Italy) R Grande	6	6
3	(Germany) M Weingärtner	6^{5}	6	4
(Slovenia) T Pisnik	7	3	6
(Australia) A Ellwood	6	1	0
(Italy) R Vinci	2	6	6
(Switzerland) E Gagliardi	6	3	6^{3}
(Australia) E Dominikovic	1	6	7
LL	(United States) T Almeda-Singian	3	2
8	(South Africa) J Kruger	6	6

Second round
1	(Spain) A Sánchez Vicario	6	6
(Chinese Taipei) J Lee	1	3
(China) J-Q Yi	4	1
5	(Italy) R Grande	6	6
(Slovenia) T Pisnik	6	6
(Italy) R Vinci	3	2
(Australia) E Dominikovic	4	4
8	(South Africa) J Kruger	6	6

Quarterfinals
1	(Spain) A Sánchez Vicario	6^{5}	6	6
5	(Italy) R Grande	7	4	3
(Slovenia) T Pisnik	6	2	6^{5}
8	(South Africa) J Kruger	2	6	7

Semifinals
1	(Spain) A Sánchez Vicario	2	6	3
8	(South Africa) J Kruger	6	4	6

=== Section 2 ===
First round
6	(Argentina) M Díaz Oliva	6	3	3
(Japan) S Asagoe	4	6	6
(Indonesia) W Prakusya	6	6
(Hungary) Z Gubacsi	1	2
Q	(Japan) H Inoue	1	3
(Australia) R McQuillan	6	6
Q	(Australia) M Dittmann	2	2
Q	(Chinese Taipei) S-w Hsieh	6	6
7	(Paraguay) R de los Ríos	4	6	4
(Australia) A Molik	6	3	6
WC	(Indonesia) A Widjaja	6	7
Q	(China) N Liu	2	6^{7}
(France) A Fusai	6	6
WC	(Indonesia) R Tedjakusuma	0	2

Second round
(Japan) S Asagoe	7	2	6
(Indonesia) W Prakusya	6^{2}	6	3
(Australia) R McQuillan	5	6	3
Q	(Chinese Taipei) S-w Hsieh	7	2	6
(Australia) A Molik	0	r
WC	(Indonesia) A Widjaja	3
(France) A Fusai	3	2
2	(Thailand) T Tanasugarn	6	6

Quarterfinals
(Japan) S Asagoe	1	4
Q	(Chinese Taipei) S-w Hsieh	6	6
WC	(Indonesia) A Widjaja	2	7	6
2	(Thailand) T Tanasugarn	6	5	2

Semifinals
Q	(Chinese Taipei) S-w Hsieh	4	6	6^{3}
WC	(Indonesia) A Widjaja	6	4	7
