= 2001 Acura Classic =

- Date: July 30 – August 5
- Edition: 23rd
- Category: Tier II
- Draw: 48S / 16D
- Prize money: $750,000
- Surface: Hard / outdoor
- Location: San Diego, California, U.S.

Champions

Singles
- (United States) Venus Williams

Doubles
- (Zimbabwe) Cara Black / (Russia) Elena Likhovtseva
- Southern California Open

The 2001 Acura Classic was a women's tennis tournament played on outdoor hard courts in San Diego in the United States. It was part of Tier II of the 2001 WTA Tour. It was the 23rd edition of the tournament and was held from July 30 through August 5, 2001. Second-seeded Venus Williams won her second consecutive singles title at the event and earned $125,000 first-prize money.

== Finals ==
=== Singles ===
(United States) Venus Williams defeated (United States) Monica Seles, 6–2, 6–3

- It was Williams's 4th singles title of the year and the 19th of her career.

=== Doubles ===
(Zimbabwe) Cara Black / (Russia) Elena Likhovtseva defeated (Switzerland) Martina Hingis / (Russia) Anna Kournikova, 6–4, 1–6, 6–4

- It was Black's 5th title of the year and the 6th of her career. It was Likhovtseva's 5th title of the year and the 14th of her career.
