= 2001 Tashkent Open =

- Date: 11–17 June
- Edition: 3rd
- Category: Tier IV
- Draw: 32S / 16D
- Prize money: $140,000
- Surface: Hard / outdoor
- Location: Tashkent, Uzbekistan
- Venue: Tashkent Tennis Center

Champions

Singles
- (Germany) Bianka Lamade

Doubles
- (Hungary) Petra Mandula / (Austria) Patricia Wartusch
- Tashkent Open

The 2001 Tashkent Open was a women's tennis tournament played on hard courts at the Tashkent Tennis Center in Tashkent, Uzbekistan that was part of the Tier IV category of the 2001 WTA Tour. It was the third edition of the tournament and was held from 11 June through 17 June 2001. Sixth-seeded Bianka Lamade won the singles title and earned $22,000 first-prize money.

== Finals ==
=== Singles ===
(Germany) Bianka Lamade defeated (Netherlands) Seda Noorlander, 6–3, 2–6, 6–2

- It was Lamade's only singles title of her career.

=== Doubles ===
(Hungary) Petra Mandula / (Austria) Patricia Wartusch defeated (Ukraine) Tatiana Perebiynis / (Belarus) Tatiana Poutchek, 6–1, 6–4
