= 2001 Acura Classic – Doubles =

Doubles
- 2001 Acura Classic

Final
- Champions: (Zimbabwe) Cara Black (Russia) Elena Likhovtseva
- Runners-up: (Switzerland) Martina Hingis (Russia) Anna Kournikova
- Score: 6–4, 1–6, 6–4

Details
- Draw: 16
- Seeds: 4

Events
| Singles | Doubles |
- Southern California Open

Lisa Raymond and Rennae Stubbs were the defending champions, but none competed this year.

Cara Black and Elena Likhovtseva won the title by defeating Martina Hingis and Anna Kournikova 6–4, 1–6, 6–4 in the final.

== Seeds ==
1. (Switzerland) Martina Hingis / (Russia) Anna Kournikova (final)
2. (Zimbabwe) Cara Black / (Russia) Elena Likhovtseva (champions)
3. (United States) Kimberly Po-Messerli / (France) Nathalie Tauziat (first round)
4. (Belgium) Kim Clijsters / (Japan) Ai Sugiyama (semifinals)

== Draw ==
Key

- Q = Qualifier
- WC = Wild card
- LL = Lucky loser
- Alt = Alternate
- ITF = ITF entry
- PR = Protected ranking
- SR = Special ranking
- SE = Special exempt
- JE = Junior exempt
- JR = Junior Accelerator Programme entrant
- CO = College Accelerator Programme entrant
- NG = Next Gen Accelerator Program entrant
- w/o = Walkover
- r = Retired
- d = Defaulted

=== Draw ===
First round
1 | (Switzerland) M Hingis (Russia) A Kournikova | 6 | 6
(South Africa) L Huber (Argentina) L Montalvo | 1 | 1
(France) A Fusai (Italy) R Grande | 6 | 6
(United States) A Frazier (United States) K Schlukebir | 2 | 2
3 | (United States) K Po-Messerli (France) N Tauziat | 4 | 6^{3}
(United States) J Capriati (Spain) A Sánchez Vicario | 6 | 7^{7}
(Italy) T Garbin (Slovakia) J Husárová | 6 | 6
(Bulgaria) M Maleeva (France) A-G Sidot | 2 | 2
(Federal Republic of Yugoslavia) J Dokic (Argentina) P Tarabini | 6^{6} | 7^{7} | 7^{7}
(Slovenia) T Križan (Australia) N Pratt | 7^{8} | 6^{4} | 6^{0}
(United States) N Arendt (Netherlands) C Vis | 5 | 7^{7} | 4
4 | (Belgium) K Clijsters (Japan) A Sugiyama | 7 | 6^{4} | 6
Q | (Russia) E Bovina (Uzbekistan) I Tulyaganova | 7 | 2 | 3
WC | (Czech Republic) D Bedáňová (United States) A Stevenson | 5 | 6 | 6
(United States) C Rubin (France) S Testud | 5 | 6^{7}
2 | (Zimbabwe) C Black (Russia) E Likhovtseva | 7 | 7^{9}

Quarterfinals
1 | (Switzerland) M Hingis (Russia) A Kournikova | 6 | 7^{7}
(France) A Fusai (Italy) R Grande | 3 | 6^{1}
(United States) J Capriati (Spain) A Sánchez Vicario | 6
(Italy) T Garbin (Slovakia) J Husárová | 1 | r
(Federal Republic of Yugoslavia) J Dokic (Argentina) P Tarabini | 3 | 1
4 | (Belgium) K Clijsters (Japan) A Sugiyama | 6 | 6
WC | (Czech Republic) D Bedáňová (United States) A Stevenson | 4 | 2
2 | (Zimbabwe) C Black (Russia) E Likhovtseva | 6 | 6

Semifinals
1 | (Switzerland) M Hingis (Russia) A Kournikova | 6 | 5 | 6
(United States) J Capriati (Spain) A Sánchez Vicario | 2 | 7 | 3
4 | (Belgium) K Clijsters (Japan) A Sugiyama | 6 | 5 | 6^{2}
2 | (Zimbabwe) C Black (Russia) E Likhovtseva | 4 | 7 | 7^{7}

Final
1 | (Switzerland) M Hingis (Russia) A Kournikova | 4 | 6 | 4
2 | (Zimbabwe) C Black (Russia) E Likhovtseva | 6 | 1 | 6
