= 2000 Wismilak International =

- Date: 6–12 November
- Edition: 6th
- Category: Tier III
- Draw: 30S / 16D
- Prize money: $170,000
- Surface: Hard / outdoor
- Location: Kuala Lumpur, Malaysia

Champions

Singles
- (Slovakia) Henrieta Nagyová

Doubles
- (Slovakia) Henrieta Nagyová / (Austria) Sylvia Plischke
← 1999 ·	Wismilak International	· 2001 →

The 2000 Wismilak International was a women's tennis tournament played on outdoor hard courts in Kuala Lumpur, Malaysia that was part of the Tier III category of the 2000 WTA Tour. It was the sixth edition of the tournament and was held from 6 November through 12 November 2000. Unseeded Henrieta Nagyová won the singles title and earned $27,573 first-prize money.

== Finals ==
=== Singles ===
(Slovakia) Henrieta Nagyová defeated (Croatia) Iva Majoli, 6–4, 6–2

- It was Nagyová's 3rd singles title of the year and the 8th of her career.

=== Doubles ===
(Slovakia) Henrieta Nagyová / (Austria) Sylvia Plischke defeated (South Africa) Liezel Horn / (Canada) Vanessa Webb, 6–4, 7–6^{(7–4)}
