= Evie Dominikovic =

Australian tennis player

- Country (sports): Australia
- Residence: Sydney
- Born: 29 May 1980 (age 46) Sydney
- Height: 1.73 m (5 ft 8 in)
- Turned pro: 1 February 1997
- Retired: 17 January 2007
- Plays: Right (two-handed backhand)
- Prize money: $638,461

Singles
- Career record: 290–212
- Career titles: 0 WTA, 12 ITF
- Highest ranking: No. 64 (10 September 2001)

Grand Slam singles results
- Australian Open: 3R (2001, 2003)
- French Open: 3R (2002)
- Wimbledon: 1R (2001–03, 2005)
- US Open: 2R (2001)

Doubles
- Career record: 180–144
- Career titles: 1 WTA, 15 ITF
- Highest ranking: No. 52 (5 August 2002)

Grand Slam doubles results
- Australian Open: 2R (2001)
- French Open: 2R (2002–05)
- Wimbledon: 2R (2002)
- US Open: 3R (2001)

Evie Dominikovic (Croatian: Evie Dominiković, pronounced [dominǐːkoʋitɕ, domǐni-]; born 29 May 1980) is a retired Australian tennis player. Her younger sister (by seven years) is the fellow former tennis player Daniella Dominikovic (later Daniella Jeflea). Evie Dominikovic also has a child, her son is Joseph Ivisic.

She turned professional in 1997. Her best Grand Slam performance came at the 2001 Australian Open and at the 2002 French Open where she reached the third round.

Her best singles ranking was 64, achieved in September 2001. Dominikovic also played women's doubles; her best doubles ranking was 52, reached in August 2002. In her career, she won one doubles title on the WTA Tour, as well as 12 singles and 15 doubles titles on the ITF Circuit.

== WTA Tour finals ==
=== Doubles: 2 (1 title, 1 runner-up) ===
Winner – Legend
Grand Slam tournaments
Tier I (0–0)
Tier II (0–0)
Tier III, IV & V (1–1)

Result	Date	Tournament	Surface	Partner	Opponents	Score
Win	Sep 2001	Bali Classic, Indonesia	Hard	(Thailand) Tamarine Tanasugarn	(Chinese Taipei) Janet Lee (Indonesia) Wynne Prakusya	7–6^{(7–1)}, 6–4
Loss	Oct 2001	China Open, Shanghai	Hard	(Thailand) Tamarine Tanasugarn	(Czech Republic) Lenka Němečková (South Africa) Liezel Huber	6–0, 7–5

== ITF Circuit finals ==
Legend
$75,000 tournaments
$50,000 tournaments
$25,000 tournaments
$10,000 tournaments

=== Singles (12–8) ===
Result	No.	Date	Tournament	Surface	Opponent	Score
Loss	1.	9 December 1996	ITF Sanctuary Cove, Australia	Hard	(Australia) Annabel Ellwood	6–3, 6–3
Loss	2.	10 March 1997	ITF Canberra, Australia	Grass	(Australia) Jane Taylor	5–7, 6–4, 4–6
Win	1.	24 March 1997	ITF Corowa, Australia	Grass	(Australia) Jane Taylor	6–4, 6–2
Loss	3.	21 April 1997	ITF Dalby, Australia	Hard	(South Africa) Nannie de Villiers	5–7, 6–7
Win	2.	28 April 1997	ITF Kooralbyn, Australia	Hard	(South Africa) Nannie de Villiers	6–2, 6–4
Win	3.	14 March 1999	ITF Biel, Switzerland	Hard (i)	(Bulgaria) Lubomira Bacheva	6–4, 6–7^{(2)}, 6–2
Loss	4.	16 October 2000	ITF Brisbane, Australia	Hard	(Australia) Rachel McQuillan	4–5, 2–4, 4–2, 2–4
Win	4.	23 October 2000	ITF Dalby, Australia	Hard	(Australia) Rachel McQuillan	6–2, 7–5
Win	5.	30 October 2000	ITF Gold Coast, Australia	Hard	(Australia) Rachel McQuillan	6–2, 6–4
Win	6.	13 November 2000	ITF Port Pirie, Australia	Hard	(Australia) Christina Wheeler	6–4, 6–4
Win	7.	3 December 2000	ITF Mount Gambier, Australia	Hard	(Australia) Rachel McQuillan	6–2, 6–1
Win	8.	21 October 2002	ITF Rockhampton, Australia	Hard	(Australia) Samantha Stosur	6–1, 6–3
Loss	5.	28 October 2002	ITF Dalby, Australia	Hard	(Australia) Rachel McQuillan	4–6, 7–6, 5–7
Loss	6.	17 November 2002	ITF Port Pirie, Australia	Hard	(South Africa) Natalie Grandin	3–6, 2–6
Loss	7.	19 July 2004	ITF Les Contamines, France	Hard	(Czech Republic) Hana Šromová	4–6, 1–6
Loss	8.	27 September 2004	ITF Canberra, Australia	Clay	(Australia) Jaslyn Hewitt	6–1, 3–6, 5–7
Win	9.	11 October 2004	ITF Rockhampton, Australia	Hard	(United States) Sunitha Rao	6–0, 2–0 ret.
Win	10.	18 October 2004	ITF Mackay, Australia	Hard	(United States) Sunitha Rao	7–5, 6–3
Win	11.	15 November 2004	ITF Nuriootpa, Australia	Hard	(South Korea) Cho Yoon-jeong	6–4, 5–7, 6–4
Win	12.	22 November 2004	ITF Mount Gambier, Australia	Hard	(South Korea) Cho Yoon-jeong	7–5, 6–3

=== Doubles (15–13) ===
Result	No.	Date	Tournament	Surface	Partner	Opponents	Score
Loss	1.	24 March 1997	ITF Warrnambool, Australia	Grass	(Australia) Amanda Grahame	(United Kingdom) Lorna Woodroffe (United Kingdom) Joanne Ward	6–4, 4–6, 2–6
Loss	2.	11 October 1998	ITF Saga, Japan	Grass	(Australia) Bryanne Stewart	(Australia) Catherine Barclay (Australia) Alicia Molik	6–7^{(3)}, 4–6
Win	1.	8 May 1999	ITF Athens, Greece	Clay	(Australia) Bryanne Stewart	(South Africa) Surina De Beer (Romania) Magda Mihalache	7–5, 6–4
Loss	3.	27 June 1999	ITF Velp, Netherlands	Clay	(Netherlands) Jolanda Mens	(Netherlands) Natasha Galouza (Hungary) Katalin Miskolczi	3–6, 5–7
Win	2.	28 February 2000	ITF Bendigo, Australia	Hard	(Australia) Amanda Grahame	(Australia) Trudi Musgrave (Australia) Bryanne Stewart	6–4, 6–1
Loss	4.	23 April 2000	ITF Fresno, United States	Hard	(Australia) Amanda Grahame	(Australia) Rachel McQuillan (Australia) Lisa McShea	4–6, 4–6
Loss	5.	30 April 2000	ITF Sarasota, US	Hard	(Australia) Amanda Grahame	(United States) Sandra Cacic (United States) Meghann Shaughnessy	4–6, 2–6
Win	3.	17 July 2000	ITF Mahwah, US	Hard	(India) Nirupama Sanjeev	(Australia) Lisa McShea (Kazakhstan) Irina Selyutina	6–4, 6–4
Loss	6.	3 December 2000	ITF Mount Gambier, Australia	Hard	(Australia) Amanda Grahame	(South Africa) Nannie de Villiers (Australia) Annabel Ellwood	2–6, 2–6
Loss	7.	10 December 2000	ITF Port Pirie, Australia	Hard	(Australia) Amanda Grahame	(South Africa) Nannie de Villiers (Australia) Annabel Ellwood	6–3, 2–6, 4–6
Win	4.	19 November 2001	ITF Nuriootpa, Australia	Hard	(Australia) Samantha Stosur	(Australia) Catherine Barclay (Australia) Christina Wheeler	6–1, 6–7^{(5)}, 6–4
Win	5.	26 November 2001	ITF Mount Gambier, Australia	Hard	(Australia) Samantha Stosur	(Australia) Amanda Grahame (Australia) Cindy Watson	6–4, 6–4
Win	6.	1 May 2002	Kangaroo Cup, Japan	Grass	(South Korea) Cho Yoon-jeong	(Japan) Shinobu Asagoe (Japan) Rika Fujiwara	6–2, 6–2
Win	7.	21 October 2002	ITF Rockhampton, Australia	Hard	(Australia) Bryanne Stewart	(Australia) Sarah Stone (Australia) Samantha Stosur	7–5, 4–6, 7–5
Loss	8.	28 October 2002	ITF Dalby, Australia	Hard	(Australia) Bryanne Stewart	(Australia) Sarah Stone (Australia) Samantha Stosur	3–6, 3–6
Win	8.	18 November 2002	ITF Nuriootpa, Australia	Hard	(Australia) Rachel McQuillan	(United States) Amanda Augustus (United States) Gabriela Lastra	7–5, 6–3
Win	9.	25 November 2002	ITF Mount Gambier, Australia	Hard	(Australia) Daniella Jeflea	(United Kingdom) Jane O'Donoghue (South Africa) Chanelle Scheepers	w/o
Win	10.	13 October 2003	ITF Mackay, Australia	Hard	(Australia) Bryanne Stewart	(Australia) Trudi Musgrave (United States) Abigail Spears	w/o
Win	11.	1 November 2003	ITF Dalby, Australia	Hard	(Australia) Casey Dellacqua	(United States) Elizabeth Schmidt (Netherlands) Anousjka van Exel	6–7^{(8)}, 6–2, 6–1
Win	12.	30 April 2004	ITF Mostar, Bosnia and Herzegovina	Clay	(Croatia) Nadja Pavić	(Serbia and Montenegro) Borka Majstorović (Croatia) Nika Ožegović	6–4, 6–1
Loss	9.	24 July 2004	ITF Les Contamines, France	Hard	(Hungary) Rita Kuti-Kis	(Czech Republic) Gabriela Chmelinová (France) Caroline Dhenin	4–6, 3–6
Loss	10.	26 July 2004	ITF Pétange, Luxembourg	Clay	(Russia) Gulnara Fattakhetdinova	(Slovakia) Eva Fislová (Slovakia) Stanislava Hrozenská	4–6, 3–6
Win	13.	24 September 2004	ITF Canberra, Australia	Clay	(Australia) Daniela Jeflea	(Australia) Mireille Dittmann (Australia) Cindy Watson	6–3, 6–1
Win	14.	11 October 2004	ITF Mackay, Australia	Hard	(Australia) Daniela Jeflea	(Australia) Monique Adamczak (Australia) Nicole Kriz	w/o
Win	15.	18 October 2004	ITF Rockhampton, Australia	Hard	(Australia) Daniela Jeflea	(Australia) Casey Dellacqua (Australia) Nicole Sewell	7–5, 6–2
Loss	11.	8 November 2004	ITF Port Pirie, Australia	Hard	(Australia) Daniela Jeflea	(Australia) Casey Dellacqua (United States) Sunitha Rao	6–4, 3–6, 6–7^{(6)}
Loss	12.	15 November 2004	ITF Nuriootpa, Australia	Hard	(Australia) Daniela Jeflea	(South Korea) Cho Yoon-jeong (South Korea) Kim Jin-hee	5–7, 2–6
Loss	13.	9 October 2006	ITF Melbourne, Australia	Hard	(Australia) Daniela Jeflea	(Australia) Casey Dellacqua (United States) Sunitha Rao	3–6, 2–6
