= Joannette Kruger =

South African tennis player

- Country (sports): South Africa
- Residence: Benoni, South Africa
- Born: 3 September 1973 (age 52) Johannesburg, South Africa
- Height: 1.79 m (5 ft 10 1/2 in)
- Turned pro: 1989
- Retired: 2003
- Plays: Right-handed (two handed-backhand)
- Prize money: $1,083,908

Singles
- Career record: 257–226
- Career titles: 2 WTA, 4 ITF
- Highest ranking: No. 21 (4 May 1998)

Grand Slam singles results
- Australian Open: 3R (1998)
- French Open: 3R (1994)
- Wimbledon: 2R (1997)
- US Open: 4R (1997)

Doubles
- Career record: 65–111
- Career titles: 1 WTA
- Highest ranking: No. 91 (29 April 2002)

Grand Slam doubles results
- Australian Open: 2R (1995)
- French Open: 2R (1995)
- Wimbledon: 1R (1995)
- US Open: 1R (1994-96, 2001, 2003)

Joannette Kruger (born 3 September 1973) is a former professional tennis player from Johannesburg, South Africa. Her career-high in singles is No. 21 in the world, a ranking she achieved on 4 May 1998.

Kruger turned professional in 1989, but it was not until 1992 that she finally broke into the world's top 100. In 1995, she had her breakout season winning her first WTA Tour title in San Juan where she beat Kyoko Nagatsuka in the final. She also recorded her first two top ten wins over Anke Huber and Lindsay Davenport.

After an injury-plagued 1996 season, she won her second career title in 1997 in Prague, Czech Republic by defeating Marion Maruska in the final. Other highlights included the quarterfinals of the Tier I in Rome, defeating Brenda Schultz-McCarthy and Karina Habšudová en route, both top twenty players, and reaching the fourth round of a Grand Slam for the first time at the US Open, beating Barbara Paulus in the first round.

She continued her success in 1998, reaching her third WTA Tour final at Oklahoma City, beating Serena Williams in the quarterfinals but losing to her sister Venus Williams in the final. Her win over Serena was the most lopsided defeat of Williams' career, losing just two games (only Annie Miller of the US finished with such a scoreline in Quebec City in 1995). At the Indian Wells Open, she upset Amanda Coetzer for the first top five win of her career. On 4 May 1998, she reached her career high of No. 21.

At the Qatar Telecom German Open in 2000, she achieved the biggest win of her career by taking down world number three Nathalie Tauziat with the loss of just two games and then went on to make her first Tier I semifinal. The following year she reached her fourth WTA Tour final at the Wismilak International, beating Grand Slam champion Arantxa Sánchez Vicario in semifinals before losing to Angelique Widjaja. She also reached two doubles finals in this year, winning Sopot with Francesca Schiavone and finishing runner-up at Basel with Marta Marrero.

Kruger's last year on the Tour was in 2003, where she used a special ranking. She went 0–5 during this year with her last match being a 6–2, 6–1 loss to Jennifer Capriati at the French Open.

== WTA career finals ==
=== Singles: 4 (2 titles, 2 runner-ups) ===
Legend
Tier I
Tier II
Tier III (1–2)
Tier IV & V (1–0)

| Result | W/L | Date | Tournament | Surface | Opponent | Score |
|---|---|---|---|---|---|---|
| Win | 1–1 | Mar 1995 | Puerto Rico Open | Hard | (Japan) Kyōko Nagatsuka | 7–6^{(7–5)}, 6–3 |
| Win | 2–0 | Jul 1997 | Prague Open | Clay | (Austria) Marion Maruska | 6–1, 6–1 |
| Loss | 2–1 | Feb 1998 | Cellular South Cup, U.S. | Hard | (United States) Venus Williams | 3–6, 2–6 |
| Loss | 2–2 | Sep 2001 | Bali Classic, Indonesia | Hard | (Indonesia) Angelique Widjaja | 6–7^{(2–7)}, 6–7^{(4–7)} |

=== Doubles: 3 (1 title, 2 runner-ups) ===
| Result | W/L | Date | Tournament | Surface | Partner | Opponents | Score |
|---|---|---|---|---|---|---|---|
| Loss | 0–1 | May 1998 | Bol Ladies Open, Croatia | Clay | (Croatia) Mirjana Lučić-Baroni | (Argentina) Laura Montalvo (Argentina) Paola Suárez | w/o |
| Win | 1–1 | Jul 2001 | Polish Open | Clay | (Italy) Francesca Schiavone | (Ukraine) Yulia Beygelzimer (Russia) Anastasia Rodionova | 6–4, 6–0 |
| Loss | 1–2 | Aug 2001 | Swiss Indoors | Clay | (Spain) Marta Marrero | (Spain) María José Martínez Sánchez (Spain) Anabel Medina Garrigues | 6–7^{(5–7)}, 2–6 |

== ITF Circuit finals ==
$25,000 tournaments
$10,000 tournaments

=== Singles: 5 (4–1) ===
| Result | No. | Date | Tournament | Surface | Opponent | Score |
|---|---|---|---|---|---|---|
| Loss | 1. | 6 November 1989 | Haifa, Israel | Hard | (Israel) Yael Segal | 0–6, 4–6 |
| Win | 1. | 14 May 1990 | Bournemouth, United Kingdom | Clay | (Italy) Anna Benzon | 7–6, 6–1 |
| Win | 2. | 11 May 1992 | Bournemouth, United Kingdom | Hard | (Netherlands) Amy van Buuren | 6–2, 6–2 |
| Win | 3. | 14 June 1992 | Modena, Italy | Clay | (France) Alexandra Fusai | 6–4, 6–3 |
| Win | 4. | 5 July 1992 | Stuttgart, Germany | Clay | (Bulgaria) Lubomira Bacheva | 6–1, 6–0 |

=== Doubles: 1 (0–1) ===
| Result | No. | Date | Tournament | Surface | Partner | Opponents | Score |
|---|---|---|---|---|---|---|---|
| Loss | 1. | 4 August 1992 | Stuttgart, Germany | Clay | (Bulgaria) Elena Pampoulova | (Czechoslovakia) Eva Martincová (Czechoslovakia) Pavlína Rajzlová | 4–6, 0–6 |

== Best Grand Slam results details ==
| | Australian Open | |
1998 Australian Open
| Round | Opponent | Score |
|---|---|---|
| 1R | (Mexico) Angélica Gavaldón | 6–0, 2–0 ret. |
| 2R | (Canada) Sonya Jeyaseelan | 6–3, 6–2 |
| 3R | (Germany) Anke Huber (10) | 7–6^{(7–4)}, 3–6, 2–6 |

| | French Open | |
1994 French Open
| Round | Opponent | Score |
|---|---|---|
| 1R | (Russia) Eugenia Maniokova | 4–6, 6–0, 6–3 |
| 2R | (Slovakia) Radka Zrubáková (Q) | 4–6, 7–5, 6–3 |
| 3R | (Germany) Steffi Graf (1) | 0–6, 6–4, 2–6 |

| | Wimbledon Championships | |
1997 Wimbledon
| Round | Opponent | Score |
|---|---|---|
| 1R | (Belgium) Stephanie Devillé | 7–6^{(7–3)}, 6–3 |
| 2R | (Germany) Anke Huber (7) | 2–6, 0–6 |

| | US Open | |
1997 US Open
| Round | Opponent | Score |
|---|---|---|
| 1R | (Austria) Barbara Paulus (14) | 6–1, 6–7, 6–1 |
| 2R | (Slovakia) Henrieta Nagyová | 6–4, 7–6 |
| 3R | (Thailand) Tamarine Tanasugarn | 6–7, 7–5, 6–4 |
| 4R | (United States) Venus Williams | 2–6, 3–6 |

| Preceded by (United States) Katrina Adams | WTA Player Service; 1998 | Succeeded by (Australia) Nicole Pratt |
