= 2002 Volvo Women's Open =

- Date: 4–10 November
- Edition: 12th
- Category: Tier V
- Draw: 32S / 16D
- Prize money: $110,000
- Surface: Hard / outdoor
- Location: Pattaya, Thailand

Champions

Singles
- (Indonesia) Angelique Widjaja

Doubles
- (Republic of Ireland) Kelly Liggan / (Czechoslovakia) Renata Voráčová
- Pattaya Women's Open

The 2002 Volvo Women's Open was a women's tennis tournament played on outdoor hard courts in Pattaya, Thailand. It was part of Tier V of the 2002 WTA Tour. It was the 12th edition of the tournament and was held from 4 November through 10 November 2002. Unseeded Angelique Widjaja won the singles title and earned $16,000 first-prize money.

== Finals ==
=== Singles ===
(Indonesia) Angelique Widjaja defeated (South Korea) Cho Yoon-jeong, 6–2, 6–4

- This was Widjaja's 1st singles title of the year and the 2nd of her career.

=== Doubles ===
(Republic of Ireland) Kelly Liggan / (Czechoslovakia) Renata Voráčová defeated (Russia) Lina Krasnoroutskaya / (Russia) Tatiana Panova, 7–5, 7–6^{(9–7)}
