= 2002 Volvo Women's Open – Singles =

Singles
- 2002 Volvo Women's Open

Final
- Champion: (Indonesia) Angelique Widjaja
- Runner-up: (South Korea) Cho Yoon-jeong
- Score: 6–2, 6–4

Details
- Draw: 32 (4Q/3WC/1LL)
- Seeds: 8

Events
Singles	Doubles
← 2001 ·	Thailand Open	· 2003 →

Patty Schnyder was the defending champion, but did not compete this year.

17-year old Angelique Widjaja won the title by defeating Cho Yoon-jeong 6–2, 6–4 in the final.

== Seeds ==
1. (Russia) Tatiana Panova (semifinals)
2. (Thailand) Tamarine Tanasugarn (quarterfinals)
3. (Slovakia) Henrieta Nagyová (first round)
4. (Germany) Anca Barna (first round)
5. (Slovakia) Martina Suchá (first round)
6. (Italy) Adriana Serra Zanetti (quarterfinals)
7. (Czech Republic) Denisa Chládková (second round)
8. (Croatia) Silvija Talaja (quarterfinals)

== Draw ==
=== Key ===
- Q = Qualifier
- WC = Wild card
- LL = Lucky loser
- Alt = Alternate
- SE = Special exempt
- PR = Protected ranking
- ITF = ITF entry
- JE = Junior exempt
- w/o = Walkover
- r = Retired
- d = Defaulted
- SR = Special ranking

=== Finals ===
Semifinals
1	(Russia) Tatiana Panova	6	1	3
(Indonesia) Angelique Widjaja	2	6	6
WC	(Russia) Lina Krasnoroutskaya	4	6^{3}
(South Korea) Cho Yoon-jeong	6	7^{7}

Final
(Indonesia) Angelique Widjaja	6	6
(South Korea) Cho Yoon-jeong	2	4

=== Top half ===
First round
1	(Russia) T Panova	6	6
Q	(Russia) M Kirilenko	1	0
(Belarus) T Poutchek	6	6
(Hungary) Z Gubacsi	0	2
(Slovakia) Ľ Cervanová	6	1	7
WC	(Thailand) S Viratprasert	3	6	5
(Japan) S Obata	6^{4}	5
6	(Italy) Ad Serra Zanetti	7^{7}	7
4	(Germany) An Barna	6	3	2
(Russia) A Rodionova	4	6	6
Q	(Russia) O Kalyuzhnaya	3	1
(Japan) S Asagoe	6	6
LL	(Czech Republic) S Kleinová	6	6
WC	(Ukraine) J Vakulenko	3	3
(Indonesia) A Widjaja	6	6
5	(Slovakia) M Suchá	1	1

Second round
1	(Russia) T Panova	6	6
(Belarus) T Poutchek	4	1
(Slovakia) Ľ Cervanová	5	4
6	(Italy) Ad Serra Zanetti	7	6
(Russia) A Rodionova	6	2	3
(Japan) S Asagoe	4	6	6
LL	(Czech Republic) S Kleinová	4	1
(Indonesia) A Widjaja	6	6

Quarterfinals
1	(Russia) T Panova	7	7
6	(Italy) Ad Serra Zanetti	5	5
(Japan) S Asagoe	6	5	4
(Indonesia) A Widjaja	3	7	6

Semifinals
1	(Russia) T Panova	6	1	3
(Indonesia) A Widjaja	2	6	6

=== Bottom half ===
First round
8	(Croatia) S Talaja	2	7^{7}	6
(Slovakia) Ľ Kurhajcová	6	6^{2}	4
Q	(France) S Cohen-Aloro	6	7
Q	(Ukraine) Y Fedak	1	5
(Poland) M Grzybowska	3	6	6
(Czech Republic) L Průšová	6	2	2
WC	(Russia) L Krasnoroutskaya	7^{7}	6
3	(Slovakia) H Nagyová	6^{5}	2
7	(Czech Republic) D Chládková	6	6
(Australia) A Molik	3	2
(South Korea) Y-j Cho	7^{7}	6
(Germany) M Weingärtner	6^{4}	2
(Japan) A Morigami	7	6
(Czech Republic) R Voráčová	5	4
(Paraguay) R de los Ríos	5	1
2	(Thailand) T Tanasugarn	7	6

Second round
8	(Croatia) S Talaja	6	3	6
Q	(France) S Cohen-Aloro	3	6	1
(Poland) M Grzybowska	1	3
WC	(Russia) L Krasnoroutskaya	6	6
7	(Czech Republic) D Chládková	3	6^{6}
(South Korea) Y-j Cho	6	7^{8}
(Japan) A Morigami	5	6^{6}
2	(Thailand) T Tanasugarn	7	7^{8}

Quarterfinals
8	(Croatia) S Talaja	3	2
WC	(Russia) L Krasnoroutskaya	6	6
(South Korea) Y-j Cho	6	6
2	(Thailand) T Tanasugarn	4	2

Semifinals
WC	(Russia) L Krasnoroutskaya	4	6^{3}
(South Korea) Y-j Cho	6	7^{7}
