= 1999 SEAT Open Luxembourg – Doubles =

Doubles
- 1999 SEAT Open Luxembourg

Final
- Champions: (Romania) Irina Spîrlea (Netherlands) Caroline Vis
- Runners-up: (Slovenia) Katarina Srebotnik (Slovenia) Tina Križan
- Score: 6–1, 6–2

Details
- Draw: 16
- Seeds: 4

Events
Singles	Doubles
← 1998 ·	Luxembourg Open	· 2000 →

The 1999 SEAT Open Luxembourg doubles was the doubles event of the ninth edition of the most prestigious women's tennis tournament held in Luxembourg. Elena Likhovtseva and Ai Sugiyama were the reigning champions but they did not compete in this year.

Irina Spîrlea and Caroline Vis won the title, defeating Slovenians Katarina Srebotnik and Tina Križan in the final.

== Seeds ==
1. (Romania) Irina Spîrlea / (Netherlands) Caroline Vis (champions)
2. (Slovenia) Tina Križan / (Slovenia) Katarina Srebotnik (final)
3. (Belgium) Els Callens / (Belgium) Dominique Van Roost (first round)
4. (Belgium) Laurence Courtois / (Germany) Anke Huber (semifinals)

== Draw ==
=== Key ===
- Q = Qualifier
- WC = Wild card
- LL = Lucky loser
- Alt = Alternate
- ITF = ITF entry
- PR = Protected ranking
- SR = Special ranking
- SE = Special exempt
- JE = Junior exempt
- JR = Junior Accelerator Programme entrant
- CO = College Accelerator Programme entrant
- NG = Next Gen Accelerator Program entrant
- w/o = Walkover
- r = Retired
- d = Defaulted

First round
1	(Romania) I Spîrlea (Netherlands) C Vis	6	6
(Italy) R Grande (Czech Republic) M Maštalířová	3	4
(United Kingdom) A Barnes (Russia) L Krasnoroutskaya	6^{6}	5
(Croatia) J Kostanić (Slovenia) T Pisnik	7^{8}	7
3	(Belgium) E Callens (Belgium) D Van Roost	2	3
(Czech Republic) K Hrdličková (Germany) B Rittner	6	6
(Austria) S Plischke (Germany) M Weingärtner	4	5
(Netherlands) M Oremans (France) A-G Sidot	6	7
(Belgium) K Clijsters (Belgium) J Henin
(Germany) J Kandarr (France) S Pitkowski	w/o
(Germany) A Bachmann (Germany) K Freye	1	0
4	(Belgium) L Courtois (Germany) A Huber	6	6
(United Kingdom) K Cross (United Kingdom) L Woodroffe	6	6
WC	(Luxembourg) C Schaul (Luxembourg) F Thill	0	1
(Belgium) S Appelmans (Luxembourg) A Kremer	6^{5}	6	4
2	(Slovenia) T Križan (Slovenia) K Srebotnik	7^{7}	3	6

Quarterfinals
1	(Romania) I Spîrlea (Netherlands) C Vis	6	7^{7}
(Croatia) J Kostanić (Slovenia) T Pisnik	3	6^{5}
(Czech Republic) K Hrdličková (Germany) B Rittner	6	4	0
(Netherlands) M Oremans (France) A-G Sidot	4	6	6
(Germany) J Kandarr (France) S Pitkowski	1	0
4	(Belgium) L Courtois (Germany) A Huber	6	6
(United Kingdom) K Cross (United Kingdom) L Woodroffe
2	(Slovenia) T Križan (Slovenia) K Srebotnik	w/o

Semifinals
1	(Romania) I Spîrlea (Netherlands) C Vis	7	6
(Netherlands) M Oremans (France) A-G Sidot	5	3
4	(Belgium) L Courtois (Germany) A Huber	1	6	3
2	(Slovenia) T Križan (Slovenia) K Srebotnik	6	3	6

Final
1	(Romania) I Spîrlea (Netherlands) C Vis	6	6
2	(Slovenia) T Križan (Slovenia) K Srebotnik	1	2
