= 1998 Volvo Women's Open – Singles =

Singles
- 1998 Volvo Women's Open

Final
- Champion: (France) Julie Halard-Decugis
- Runner-up: (China) Fang Li
- Score: 6–1, 6–2

Details
- Draw: 32
- Seeds: 8

Events
Singles	Doubles
- Thailand Open

Henrieta Nagyová was the defending champion but lost in the first round to Silvija Talaja.

Julie Halard-Decugis won in the final 6–1, 6–2 against Fang Li.

== Seeds ==
A champion seed is indicated in bold text while text in italics indicates the round in which that seed was eliminated.

1. (Slovakia) Henrieta Nagyová (first round)
2. (France) **Julie Halard-Decugis (champion)**
3. (Thailand) Tamarine Tanasugarn (quarterfinals)
4. (Austria) Sylvia Plischke (first round)
5. (China) Li Fang (final)
6. (Israel) Anna Smashnova (first round)
7. (Belarus) Olga Barabanschikova (quarterfinals)
8. (Chinese Taipei) Wang Shi-ting (quarterfinals)

== Draw ==
Key

- Q = Qualifier
- WC = Wild card
- LL = Lucky loser
- Alt = Alternate
- ITF = ITF entry
- PR = Protected ranking
- SR = Special ranking
- SE = Special exempt
- JE = Junior exempt
- JR = Junior Accelerator Programme entrant
- CO = College Accelerator Programme entrant
- NG = Next Gen Accelerator Program entrant
- w/o = Walkover
- r = Retired
- d = Defaulted

First round
1	(Slovakia) H Nagyová	3	**6**	6
(Croatia) **S Talaja**	**6**	2	**7**
(Japan) H Inoue	**7**	4	3
Q	(China) **D Ding**	5	**6**	**6**
(Germany) **M Weingärtner**	**6**	**6**
Q	(Japan) S Asagoe	1	3
(Russia) T Panova	2	**6**	2
7	(Belarus) **O Barabanschikova**	**6**	1	**6**
3	(Thailand) **T Tanasugarn**	**7**	**6**
(Romania) R Sandu	5	3
WC	(Thailand) B Sangaram	2	1
(Chinese Taipei) **J Lee**	**6**	**6**
(Japan) **M Saeki**	**6**	**6**
(Czech Republic) S Kleinová	4	3
(Poland) A Olsza	1	3
5	(China) **F Li**	**6**	**6**
6	(Israel) A Smashnova	4	4
(Belgium) **L Courtois**	**6**	**6**
(Belgium) E Callens	4	**6**	2
(Puerto Rico) **K Brandi**	**6**	4	**6**
Q	(Japan) R Otakeyama	5	**6**	3
(Czech Republic) **A Gerši**	**7**	4	**6**
(United States) **M Tu**	**6**	**6**
4	(Austria) S Plischke	3	3
8	(Chinese Taipei) **S-T Wang**	**6**	**6**
WC	(Thailand) O Wongkamalasai	3	0
(South Africa) L Horn	**7**	2	3
(Japan) **Y Yoshida**	6	**6**	**6**
(Australia) **N Pratt**	3	**6**	**6**
(Czech Republic) D Chládková	**6**	0	0
Q	(Australia) J Dokić	6	**6**	3
2	(France) **J Halard-Decugis**	**7**	4	**6**

Second round
(Croatia) **S Talaja**	**6**	**6**
Q	(China) D Ding	4	0
(Germany) M Weingärtner	3	0	r
7	(Belarus) **O Barabanschikova**	**6**	**5**
3	(Thailand) **T Tanasugarn**	**6**	**7**
(Chinese Taipei) J Lee	2	5
(Japan) M Saeki	2	0
5	(China) **F Li**	**6**	**6**
(Belgium) L Courtois	**7**	4	3
(Puerto Rico) **K Brandi**	5	**6**	**6**
(Czech Republic) A Gerši	4	**6**	4
(United States) **M Tu**	**6**	4	**6**
8	(Chinese Taipei) **S-T Wang**	**6**	**7**
(Japan) Y Yoshida	2	5
(Australia) N Pratt	1	5
2	(France) **J Halard-Decugis**	**6**	**7**

Quarterfinals
(Croatia) **S Talaja**	**6**	**6**
7	(Belarus) O Barabanschikova	4	1
3	(Thailand) T Tanasugarn	6	4
5	(China) **F Li**	**7**	**6**
(Puerto Rico) **K Brandi**	**6**	**6**
(United States) M Tu	3	3
8	(Chinese Taipei) S-T Wang	**7**	2	0
2	(France) **J Halard-Decugis**	5	**6**	**6**

Semifinals
(Croatia) S Talaja	3	3
5	(China) **F Li**	**6**	**6**
(Puerto Rico) K Brandi	0	1
2	(France) **J Halard-Decugis**	**6**	**6**

Final
5	(China) Li Fang	1	2
2	(France) **J Halard-Decugis**	**6**	**6**
