= 1999 Pattaya Women's Open =

- Date: 15–21 November
- Edition: 9th
- Category: Tier IV
- Draw: 32S / 16D
- Prize money: $112,500
- Surface: Hard / outdoor
- Location: Pattaya, Thailand

Champions

Singles
- (Bulgaria) Magdalena Maleeva

Doubles
- (France) Émilie Loit / (Sweden) Åsa Carlsson
| ← 1998 · | Pattaya Women's Open | · 2000 → |

The 1999 Pattaya Women's Open, also known as the Volvo Women's Open, was a women's tennis tournament played on outdoor hard courts in Pattaya, Thailand. It was part of Tier IV of the 1999 WTA Tour. It was the 9th edition of the tournament and was held from 15 November through 22 November 1999, making it the final tournament of the year. Qualifier Magdalena Maleeva won the singles title.

== Finals ==
=== Singles ===
(Bulgaria) Magdalena Maleeva defeated (Luxembourg) Anne Kremer, 4–6, 6–1, 6–2

- This was Maleeva's seventh WTA title and her first since 1995.

=== Doubles ===
(France) Émilie Loit / (Sweden) Åsa Carlsson defeated (Russia) Evgenia Koulikovskaya / (Austria) Patricia Wartusch, 6–1, 6–4

== Entrants ==
=== Seeds ===
| Country | Player | Rank | Seed |
|---|---|---|---|
| CRO | Silvija Talaja | 31 | 1 |
| FRA | Sarah Pitkowski | 33 | 2 |
| AUT | Sylvia Plischke | 36 | 3 |
| LUX | Anne Kremer | 39 | 4 |
| RUS | Tatiana Panova | 44 | 5 |
| PUR | Kristina Brandi | 55 | 6 |
| CZE | Denisa Chládková | 59 | 7 |
| AUS | Nicole Pratt | 58 | 8 |

=== Other entrants ===
The following players received wildcards into the singles main draw:

- (Sweden) Åsa Carlsson
- (Thailand) Benjamas Sangaram
- (South Africa) Joannette Kruger

The following players received wildcards into the doubles main draw:

- (Thailand) Benjamas Sangaram / (Uzbekistan) Iroda Tulyaganova

The following players received entry from the singles qualifying draw:

- (Uzbekistan) Iroda Tulyaganova
- (Slovenia) Tina Križan
- (Bulgaria) Magdalena Maleeva
- (Belarus) Olga Barabanschikova

The following players received entry from the doubles qualifying draw:

- (Chinese Taipei) Janet Lee / (Indonesia) Wynne Prakusya
