= 1999 Pattaya Women's Open – Singles =

Singles
- 1999 Pattaya Women's Open

Final
- Champion: (Bulgaria) Magdalena Maleeva
- Runner-up: (Luxembourg) Anne Kremer
- Score: 4–6, 6–1, 6–2

Details
- Draw: 32
- Seeds: 8

Events
Singles	Doubles
← 1998 ·	Pattaya Women's Open	· 2000 →

The 1999 Pattaya Women's Open singles was the tennis singles event of the tenth edition of the most prestigious tournament in Thailand. Qualifier and former World No. 4 Magdalena Maleeva won the title, defeating Anne Kremer in the final to claim her first in four years.

== Seeds ==
1. (Croatia) Silvija Talaja (semifinals)
2. (France) Sarah Pitkowski (first round)
3. (Austria) Sylvia Plischke (second round)
4. (Luxembourg) Anne Kremer (final)
5. (Russia) Tatiana Panova (second round)
6. (Puerto Rico) Kristina Brandi (second round)
7. (Czech Republic) Denisa Chládková (semifinals)
8. (Australia) Nicole Pratt (quarterfinals)

== Draw ==
=== Key ===
- Q = Qualifier
- WC = Wild card
- LL = Lucky loser
- Alt = Alternate
- SE = Special exempt
- PR = Protected ranking
- ITF = ITF entry
- JE = Junior exempt
- w/o = Walkover
- r = Retired
- d = Defaulted
- SR = Special ranking

=== Finals ===
Semifinals
1	(Croatia) Silvija Talaja	6	6^{2}	2
4	(Luxembourg) Anne Kremer	4	7^{7}	6
7	(Czech Republic) Denisa Chládková	6^{4}	2
Q	(Bulgaria) Magdalena Maleeva	7^{7}	6

Final
4	(Luxembourg) Anne Kremer	6	1	2
Q	(Bulgaria) Magdalena Maleeva	4	6	6

=== Top half ===
First round
1	(Croatia) S Talaja	7	6
(Austria) P Wartusch	5	3
(Australia) A Molik	6	2	4
(Czech Republic) S Kleinová	2	6	6
(Belgium) L Courtois	3	6	3
(Hungary) K Marosi	6	0	6
Q	(Uzbekistan) I Tulyaganova	0	2
8	(Australia) N Pratt	6	6
4	(Luxembourg) A Kremer	4	6	7
(Thailand) T Tanasugarn	6	3	5
(Slovenia) T Pisnik	1	0^{r}
(France) A Cocheteux	6	1
WC	(Sweden) Å Carlsson	4	6	6
WC	(Thailand) B Sangaram	6	2	4
(Netherlands) K Boogert	6	3	3
7	(Puerto Rico) K Brandi	1	6	6

Second round
1	(Croatia) S Talaja	6	6
(Czech Republic) S Kleinová	4	1
(Hungary) K Marosi	7	3	3
8	(Australia) N Pratt	5	6	6
4	(Luxembourg) A Kremer	6	6
(France) A Cocheteux	1	2
WC	(Sweden) Å Carlsson	2	6	6
7	(Puerto Rico) K Brandi	6	2	3

Quarterfinals
1	(Croatia) S Talaja	6	6
8	(Australia) N Pratt	0	2
4	(Luxembourg) A Kremer	6	7^{10}
WC	(Sweden) Å Carlsson	3	6^{8}

Semifinals
1	(Croatia) S Talaja	6	6^{2}	2
4	(Luxembourg) A Kremer	4	7^{7}	6

=== Bottom half ===
First round
7	(Czech Republic) D Chládková	6	6
(China) J-Q Yi	4	4
Q	(Slovenia) T Križan	2	6	6^{5}
(United States) E deLone	6	3	7^{7}
(France) É Loit	6^{6}	2
WC	(South Africa) J Kruger	7^{8}	6
(Czech Republic) A Gerši	4	1
3	(Austria) S Plischke	6	6
5	(Russia) T Panova	6	6
(Slovenia) K Srebotnik	1	2
Q	(Bulgaria) M Maleeva	6	6
(Poland) M Grzybowska	1	0
Q	(Belarus) O Barabanschikova	6^{5}	3
(Italy) R Grande	7^{7}	6
(Russia) A Myskina	2	7^{9}	3
2	(France) S Pitkowski	6	6^{7}	6

Second round
7	(Czech Republic) D Chládková	w/o
(United States) E deLone
WC	(South Africa) J Kruger	2	6	6
3	(Austria) S Plischke	6	2	2
5	(Russia) T Panova	2	6	6^{6}
Q	(Bulgaria) M Maleeva	6	3	7^{8}
(Italy) R Grande	6	7
2	(France) S Pitkowski	2	5

Quarterfinals
7	(Czech Republic) D Chládková	7^{7}	6
WC	(South Africa) J Kruger	6^{2}	1
Q	(Bulgaria) M Maleeva	7	6
(Italy) R Grande	5	1

Semifinals
7	(Czech Republic) D Chládková	5	1
Q	(Bulgaria) M Maleeva	7	6

== Qualifying ==
=== Seeds ===
1. (Belarus) Olga Barabanschikova (Qualifier)
2. (Chinese Taipei) Janet Lee (second round)
3. replaced by (Japan) Yoshiko Sasano (first round)
4. (Switzerland) Miroslava Vavrinec (first round)
5. (Slovakia) Ľudmila Cervanová (second round)
6. (Australia) Annabel Ellwood (first round)
7. (Italy) Tathiana Garbin (first round)
8. (Bulgaria) Magdalena Maleeva (Qualifier)

=== Qualifiers ===
1. (Belarus) Olga Barabanschikova
2. (Slovenia) Tina Križan
3. (Bulgaria) Magdalena Maleeva
4. (Uzbekistan) Iroda Tulyaganova

== Qualifying draw ==
=== Key ===
- Q = Qualifier
- WC = Wild card
- LL = Lucky loser
- Alt = Alternate
- SE = Special exempt
- PR = Protected ranking
- ITF = ITF entry
- JE = Junior exempt
- w/o = Walkover
- r = Retired
- d = Defaulted
- SR = Special ranking

=== First qualifier ===
First round
1	(Belarus) Olga Barabanschikova	6	6
(Romania) Raluca Sandu	4	3
(Ukraine) Tatiana Kovalchuk	4	2
(India) Nirupama Vaidyanathan	6	6
WC	(Thailand) Orawan Wongkamalasai	5	3
(Russia) Eugenia Kulikovskaya	7	6
(Indonesia) Wynne Prakusya	6	6
6	(Australia) Annabel Ellwood	3	3

Second round
1	(Belarus) Olga Barabanschikova	6	5	7
(India) Nirupama Vaidyanathan	2	7	5
(Russia) Eugenia Kulikovskaya	0	5
(Indonesia) Wynne Prakusya	6	7

Qualifying competition
1	(Belarus) Olga Barabanschikova	6	7
(Indonesia) Wynne Prakusya	3	5

=== Second qualifier ===
First round
Alt	(Japan) Yoshiko Sasano	6^{4}	4
(Hungary) Zsófia Gubacsi	7^{7}	6
(Romania) Andreea Vanc	3	0
(Canada) Vanessa Webb	6	6
(Slovakia) Martina Suchá	6	2
(Slovakia) Janette Husárová	1	2^{r}
(Slovenia) Tina Križan	7	4	7
7	(Italy) Tathiana Garbin	5	6	5

Second round
(Hungary) Zsófia Gubacsi	6^{7}	7	7^{7}
(Canada) Vanessa Webb	7^{9}	5	6^{3}
(Slovakia) Martina Suchá	2	3
(Slovenia) Tina Križan	6	6

Qualifying competition
(Hungary) Zsófia Gubacsi	3	5
(Slovenia) Tina Križan	6	7

=== Third qualifier ===
First round
8	(Bulgaria) Magdalena Maleeva	6^{7}	6	7^{7}
(Czech Republic) Nikola Hübnerová	7^{9}	0	6^{2}
WC	(Thailand) Napaporn Tongsalee	1	6	4
WC	(Thailand) Monthika Anuchan	6	2	6
(Japan) Riei Otakeyama	5	2
(France) Stéphanie Foretz	7	6
(United States) Linda Wild	6	6
7	(Switzerland) Miroslava Vavrinec	4	2

Second round
8	(Bulgaria) Magdalena Maleeva	6	6
WC	(Thailand) Monthika Anuchan	1	4
(France) Stéphanie Foretz	4	6	4
(United States) Linda Wild	6	1	1^{r}

Qualifying competition
8	(Bulgaria) Magdalena Maleeva	6	6
(France) Stéphanie Foretz	4	0

=== Fourth qualifier ===
First round
5	(Slovakia) Ľudmila Cervanová	6	3	6
(Austria) Marion Maruska	2	6	0
(Austria) Evelyn Fauth	2	2
(South Korea) Cho Yoon-jeong	6	6
(Uzbekistan) Iroda Tulyaganova	6	6
(Thailand) Suchanun Viratprasert	2	0
(Belgium) Daphne van de Zande	4	4
2	(Chinese Taipei) Janet Lee	6	6

Second round
5	(Slovakia) Ľudmila Cervanová	3	1
(South Korea) Cho Yoon-jeong	6	6
(Uzbekistan) Iroda Tulyaganova	6	6
2	(Chinese Taipei) Janet Lee	3	4

Qualifying competition
(South Korea) Cho Yoon-jeong	1	3
(Uzbekistan) Iroda Tulyaganova	6	6
