= 2001 Volvo Women's Open – Doubles =

Doubles
- 2001 Volvo Women's Open

Final
- Champions: (Sweden) Åsa Carlsson (Uzbekistan) Iroda Tulyaganova
- Runners-up: (South Africa) Liezel Huber (Indonesia) Wynne Prakusya
- Score: 4–6, 6–3, 6–3

Details
- Draw: 16 (1Q/1WC)
- Seeds: 4

Events
Singles	Doubles
← 2000 ·	Thailand Open	· 2002 →

Yayuk Basuki and Caroline Vis were the defending champions, but Vis did not compete this year. Basuki teamed up with Tamarine Tanasugarn and lost in semifinals to tournament winners Åsa Carlsson and Iroda Tulyaganova.

Carlsson and Tulyaganova won the title by defeating Liezel Huber and Wynne Prakusya 4–6, 6–3, 6–3 in the final.

== Seeds ==
1. (South Africa) Liezel Huber / (Indonesia) Wynne Prakusya (final)
2. (Sweden) Åsa Carlsson / (Uzbekistan) Iroda Tulyaganova (champions)
3. (Slovakia) Henrieta Nagyová / (Switzerland) Patty Schnyder (quarterfinals)
4. (Hungary) Petra Mandula / (Austria) Patricia Wartusch (first round)

== Draw ==
=== Key ===
- Q = Qualifier
- WC = Wild card
- LL = Lucky loser
- Alt = Alternate
- SE = Special exempt
- PR = Protected ranking
- ITF = ITF entry
- JE = Junior exempt
- w/o = Walkover
- r = Retired
- d = Defaulted
- SR = Special ranking

=== Draw ===
First round
1	(South Africa) L Huber (Indonesia) W Prakusya	6	6
(Australia) C Barclay (Denmark) E Dyrberg	2	2
(South Korea) Y-j Choi (Hungary) Z Gubacsi	0	2
(Russia) E Kulikovskaya (Croatia) S Talaja	6	6
4	(Hungary) P Mandula (Austria) P Wartusch	4	6^{4}
(South Korea) M-r Jeon (South Korea) E-h Kim	6	7^{7}
(Russia) G Fokina (Belarus) N Ostrovskaya	6	6
(Russia) A Rodionova (Germany) C Schneider	1	3
Q	(Chinese Taipei) S-w Hsieh (Hong Kong) K-p Tong	3	2
(Indonesia) Y Basuki (Thailand) T Tanasugarn	6	6
(Paraguay) R de los Ríos (Romania) A Vanc	6	1	3
3	(Slovakia) H Nagyová (Switzerland) P Schnyder	3	6	6
(Russia) T Panova (Belarus) T Poutchek	6	5	6
(Greece) E Daniilidou (Luxembourg) A Kremer	2	7	4
WC	(Thailand) M Thangphong (Thailand) N Tongsalee	2	0
2	(Sweden) Å Carlsson (Uzbekistan) I Tulyaganova	6	6

Quarterfinals
1	(South Africa) L Huber (Indonesia) W Prakusya	6	6
(Russia) E Kulikovskaya (Croatia) S Talaja	1	3
(South Korea) M-r Jeon (South Korea) E-h Kim	6	7^{7}
(Russia) G Fokina (Belarus) N Ostrovskaya	4	6^{3}
(Indonesia) Y Basuki (Thailand) T Tanasugarn	6	6
3	(Slovakia) H Nagyová (Switzerland) P Schnyder	4	2
(Russia) T Panova (Belarus) T Poutchek	6	6^{4}	4
2	(Sweden) Å Carlsson (Uzbekistan) I Tulyaganova	4	7^{7}	6

Semifinals
1	(South Africa) L Huber (Indonesia) W Prakusya	6	6
(South Korea) M-r Jeon (South Korea) E-h Kim	0	2
(Indonesia) Y Basuki (Thailand) T Tanasugarn	6	5	1
2	(Sweden) Å Carlsson (Uzbekistan) I Tulyaganova	3	7	6

Final
1	(South Africa) L Huber (Indonesia) W Prakusya	6	3	3
2	(Sweden) Å Carlsson (Uzbekistan) I Tulyaganova	4	6	6
