= 1998 Volvo Women's Open – Doubles =

Doubles
- 1998 Volvo Women's Open

Final
- Champions: (Belgium) Els Callens (France) Julie Halard-Decugis
- Runners-up: (Japan) Rika Hiraki (Poland) Aleksandra Olsza
- Score: 3–6, 6–2, 6–2

Details
- Draw: 16 (1Q)
- Seeds: 4

Events
Singles	Doubles
← 1997 ·	Thailand Open	· 1999 →

Kristine Kunce and Corina Morariu were the defending champions but only Kunce competed that year with Nicole Pratt.

Kunce and Pratt lost in the quarterfinals to Rika Hiraki and Aleksandra Olsza.

Els Callens and Julie Halard-Decugis won in the final 3–6, 6–2, 6–2 against Hiraki and Olsza.

== Seeds ==
Champion seeds are indicated in bold text while text in italics indicates the round in which those seeds were eliminated.

1. (Belgium) **Els Callens** / (France) **Julie Halard-Decugis (champions)**
2. (Australia) Kristine Kunce / (Australia) Nicole Pratt (quarterfinals)
3. (Japan) Miho Saeki / (Japan) Yuka Yoshida (semifinals)
4. (South Africa) Liezel Horn / (United States) Katie Schlukebir (semifinals)

== Draw ==
=== Key ===
- Q = Qualifier
- WC = Wild card
- LL = Lucky loser
- Alt = Alternate
- SE = Special exempt
- PR = Protected ranking
- ITF = ITF entry
- JE = Junior exempt
- w/o = Walkover
- r = Retired
- d = Defaulted
- SR = Special ranking

First round
1	(Belgium) **E Callens** (France) **J Halard-Decugis**	**6**	**7**
(China) D Ding (China) F Li	4	6
(Japan) **S Asagoe** (Thailand) **B Sangaram**	5	**7**	**7**
(Belarus) O Barabanschikova (Australia) L Pleming	**7**	6	5
4	(South Africa) **L Horn** (United States) **K Schlukebir**	**7**	1	**6**
(Belgium) L Courtois (Thailand) T Tanasugarn	5	**6**	2
(Puerto Rico) K Brandi (United States) T Singian	**7**	3	1
Q	(China) **L-L Chen** (China) **T Li**	5	**6**	**6**
(Thailand) S Duangchan (Romania) R Sandu	6	3
(China) **L Li** (China) **J-Q Yi**	**7**	**6**
(Chinese Taipei) J Lee (Chinese Taipei) S-T Wang	3	3
3	(Japan) **M Saeki** (Japan) **Y Yoshida**	**6**	**6**
(Japan) **R Hiraki** (Poland) **A Olsza**	1	**6**	**6**
(United States) M Tu (Germany) M Weingärtner	**6**	4	4
(Austria) S Plischke (Germany) C Singer	3	2
2	(Australia) **K Kunce** (Australia) **N Pratt**	**6**	**6**

Quarterfinals
1	(Belgium) **E Callens** (France) **J Halard-Decugis**	**6**	**6**
(Japan) S Asagoe (Thailand) B Sangaram	3	1
4	(South Africa) **L Horn** (United States) **K Schlukebir**	**6**	**6**
Q	(China) L-L Chen (China) T Li	4	3
(China) L Li (China) J-Q Yi	**7**	2	4
3	(Japan) **M Saeki** (Japan) **Y Yoshida**	5	**6**	**6**
(Japan) **R Hiraki** (Poland) **A Olsza**	**7**	**6**
2	(Australia) K Kunce (Australia) N Pratt	5	2

Semifinals
1	(Belgium) **E Callens** (France) **J Halard-Decugis**	**6**	**6**
4	(South Africa) L Horn (United States) K Schlukebir	1	4
3	(Japan) M Saeki (Japan) Y Yoshida	0	**6**	4
(Japan) **R Hiraki** (Poland) **A Olsza**	**6**	4	**6**

Final
1	(Belgium) **Els Callens** (France) **Julie Halard-Decugis**	3	**6**	**6**
(Japan) Rika Hiraki (Poland) Aleksandra Olsza	**6**	2	2
