= 2001 Volvo Women's Open – Singles =

Singles
- 2001 Volvo Women's Open

Final
- Champion: (Switzerland) Patty Schnyder
- Runner-up: (Slovakia) Henrieta Nagyová
- Score: 6–0, 6–4

Details
- Draw: 32 (2WC/4Q/1LL)
- Seeds: 8

Events
Singles	Doubles
← 2000 ·	Thailand Open	· 2002 →

Anne Kremer was the defending champion, but lost in quarterfinals to tournament winner Patty Schnyder.

Schnyder won the title by defeating Henrieta Nagyová 6–0, 6–4 in the final.

== Seeds ==
1. (Uzbekistan) Iroda Tulyaganova (first round)
2. (Slovakia) Henrieta Nagyová (final)
3. (Thailand) Tamarine Tanasugarn (first round)
4. (Luxembourg) Anne Kremer (quarterfinals)
5. (Russia) Tatiana Panova (quarterfinals)
6. (Japan) Ai Sugiyama (second round)
7. (Switzerland) Patty Schnyder (champion)
8. (Paraguay) Rossana de los Ríos (semifinals)

== Draw ==
=== Key ===
- Q = Qualifier
- WC = Wild card
- LL = Lucky loser
- Alt = Alternate
- SE = Special exempt
- PR = Protected ranking
- ITF = ITF entry
- JE = Junior exempt
- w/o = Walkover
- r = Retired
- d = Defaulted
- SR = Special ranking

=== Finals ===
Semifinals
8	(Paraguay) Rossana de los Ríos	5	6	3
7	(Switzerland) Patty Schnyder	7	0	6
(Belarus) Tatiana Poutchek	2	2
2/WC	(Slovakia) Henrieta Nagyová	6	6

Final
7	(Switzerland) Patty Schnyder	6	6
2/WC	(Slovakia) Henrieta Nagyová	0	4

=== Top half ===
First round
1	(Uzbekistan) I Tulyaganova	4	6^{2}
(Ukraine) J Vakulenko	6	7^{7}
Q	(Chinese Taipei) S-w Hsieh	6^{3}	7	6
(South Korea) Y-j Cho	7^{7}	5	4
(Sweden) Å Carlsson	3	2
(Indonesia) W Prakusya	6	6
(Hungary) P Mandula	4	2
8	(Paraguay) R de los Ríos	6	6
4	(Luxembourg) A Kremer	6	4	7^{8}
(Belarus) N Ostrovskaya	3	6	6^{6}
(Slovakia) M Suchá	6	4	6
(New Zealand) P Nola	2	6	3
(Denmark) E Dyrberg	3	6	7^{7}
Q	(Slovakia) L Dlhopolcová	6	0	6^{3}
(France) É Loit	5	1
7	(Switzerland) P Schnyder	7	6

Second round
(Ukraine) J Vakulenko	5	6	2
Q	(Chinese Taipei) S-w Hsieh	7	1	6
(Indonesia) W Prakusya	2	6^{4}
8	(Paraguay) R de los Ríos	6	7^{7}
4	(Luxembourg) A Kremer	6	7
(Slovakia) M Suchá	2	5
(Denmark) E Dyrberg	3	4
7	(Switzerland) P Schnyder	6	6

Quarterfinals
Q	(Chinese Taipei) S-w Hsieh	6	3	4
8	(Paraguay) R de los Ríos	1	6	6
4	(Luxembourg) A Kremer	3	4
7	(Switzerland) P Schnyder	6	6

Semifinals
8	(Paraguay) R de los Ríos	5	6	3
7	(Switzerland) P Schnyder	7	0	6

=== Bottom half ===
First round
5	(Russia) T Panova	6	7^{7}
LL	(Russia) E Kulikovskaya	4	6^{3}
Q	(South Korea) E-h Kim	4	6	5
(Czech Republic) S Kleinová	6	3	7
(Japan) S Obata	6	6
(Greece) E Daniilidou	2	4
(Belarus) T Poutchek	3	6	6
3	(Thailand) T Tanasugarn	6	3	2
6	(Japan) A Sugiyama	5	6	6
(Croatia) S Talaja	7	3	3
(Czech Republic) A Gerši	3	1
Q	(South Africa) L Huber	6	6
WC	(Thailand) M Tangphong	1	4
(Hungary) Z Gubacsi	6	6
(Croatia) J Kostanić	4	6	2
2/WC	(Slovakia) H Nagyová	6	0	6

Second round
5	(Russia) T Panova	7	1
(Czech Republic) S Kleinová	5	1^{r}
(Japan) S Obata	5	5
(Belarus) T Poutchek	7	7
6	(Japan) A Sugiyama	5	2
Q	(South Africa) L Huber	7	6
(Hungary) Z Gubacsi	2	0
2/WC	(Slovakia) H Nagyová	6	6

Quarterfinals
5	(Russia) T Panova	2	3
(Belarus) T Poutchek	6	6
Q	(South Africa) L Huber	4	3
2/WC	(Slovakia) H Nagyová	6	6

Semifinals
(Belarus) T Poutchek	2	2
2/WC	(Slovakia) H Nagyová	6	6
