= 2002 ASB Bank Classic – Doubles =

Doubles
- 2002 ASB Bank Classic

Final
- Champions: (United States) Nicole Arendt (South Africa) Liezel Huber
- Runners-up: (Czech Republic) Květa Hrdličková (Slovakia) Henrieta Nagyová
- Score: 7–5, 6–4

Details
- Draw: 16 (1WC/1Q)
- Seeds: 4

Events
Singles	Doubles
- WTA Auckland Open

Alexandra Fusai and Rita Grande were the defending champions, but none competed this year. Grande chose to compete at Gold Coast during the same week.

Nicole Arendt and Liezel Huber won the title by defeating Květa Hrdličková and Henrieta Nagyová 7–5, 6–4 in the final.

== Seeds ==
1. (United States) Nicole Arendt / (South Africa) Liezel Huber (champions)
2. (Spain) María José Martínez Sánchez / (Spain) Anabel Medina Garrigues (semifinals)
3. (Argentina) María Emilia Salerni / (Argentina) Patricia Tarabini (quarterfinals)
4. (Czech Republic) Květa Hrdličková / (Slovakia) Henrieta Nagyová (final)

== Draw ==
Key

- Q = Qualifier
- WC = Wild card
- LL = Lucky loser
- Alt = Alternate
- ITF = ITF entry
- PR = Protected ranking
- SR = Special ranking
- SE = Special exempt
- JE = Junior exempt
- JR = Junior Accelerator Programme entrant
- CO = College Accelerator Programme entrant
- NG = Next Gen Accelerator Program entrant
- w/o = Walkover
- r = Retired
- d = Defaulted

=== Draw ===
First round
1	(United States) N Arendt (South Africa) L Huber	4	7	6
(United States) A Augustus (United States) J Embry	6	5	2
(Slovakia) J Husárová (Slovenia) M Matevžič	6	7^{7}
(Russia) A Jidkova (Romania) A Vanc	4	6^{2}
3	(Argentina) ME Salerni (Argentina) P Tarabini	6	6
(Argentina) M Díaz Oliva (United Kingdom) J Pullin	1	3
(Australia) R McQuillan (Australia) T Musgrave	6	3	6^{6}
(Russia) T Panova (Belarus) T Poutchek	4	6	7^{8}
Q	(Russia) A Rodionova (Germany) C Schneider	7	2	3
(South Africa) K Grant (United States) A Spears	5	6	6
(Spain) C Martínez (Austria) B Schwartz	3	3
4	(Czech Republic) K Hrdličková (Slovakia) H Nagyová	6	6
(Switzerland) E Gagliardi (United States) M Tu	6	7
WC	(Brazil) J Cortez (New Zealand) S Stephens	4	5
(Argentina) C Fernández (United States) A Frazier	7^{7}	6^{4}	4
2	(Spain) MJ Martínez Sánchez (Spain) A Medina Garrigues	6^{4}	7^{7}	6

Quarterfinals
1	(United States) N Arendt (South Africa) L Huber	6	6
(Slovakia) J Husárová (Slovenia) M Matevžič	3	0
3	(Argentina) ME Salerni (Argentina) P Tarabini	5	6	4
(Russia) T Panova (Belarus) T Poutchek	7	3	6
(South Africa) K Grant (United States) A Spears	2	5
4	(Czech Republic) K Hrdličková (Slovakia) H Nagyová	6	7
(Switzerland) E Gagliardi (United States) M Tu	2	1
2	(Spain) MJ Martínez Sánchez (Spain) A Medina Garrigues	6	6

Semifinals
1	(United States) N Arendt (South Africa) L Huber	6	6
(Russia) T Panova (Belarus) T Poutchek	2	3
4	(Czech Republic) K Hrdličková (Slovakia) H Nagyová	6	6
2	(Spain) MJ Martínez Sánchez (Spain) A Medina Garrigues	4	2

Final
1	(United States) N Arendt (South Africa) L Huber	7	6
4	(Czech Republic) K Hrdličková (Slovakia) H Nagyová	5	4
