= 2000 SEAT Open =

- Date: 25 September – 1 October
- Edition: 5th
- Category: Tier III
- Draw: 30S / 16D
- Prize money: $170,000
- Surface: Carpet / indoor
- Location: Kockelscheuer, Luxembourg

Champions

Singles
- (United States) Jennifer Capriati

Doubles
- (France) Alexandra Fusai / (France) Nathalie Tauziat
← 1999 ·	Luxembourg Open	· 2001 →

The 2000 SEAT Open was a women's tennis tournament played on indoor carpet courts in Kockelscheuer, Luxembourg which was part of Tier III of the 2000 WTA Tour. It was the 5th edition of the tournament and was held from 25 September until 1 October 2000. Third-seeded Jennifer Capriati won the singles title and earned $27,000 first-prize money.

== Finals ==
=== Singles ===
(United States) Jennifer Capriati defeated (Bulgaria) Magdalena Maleeva, 4–6, 6–1, 6–4

- This was Capriati's first singles title of the year and the 9th of her career.

=== Doubles ===
(France) Alexandra Fusai / (France) Nathalie Tauziat defeated (Bulgaria) Lubomira Bacheva / (Spain) Cristina Torrens Valero, 6–3, 7–6^{(7–0)}
