= 2002 SEAT Open =

- Date: 21–27 October
- Edition: 7th
- Category: Tier III
- Draw: 30S / 16D
- Prize money: $225,000
- Surface: Hard / indoor
- Location: Kockelscheuer, Luxembourg

Champions

Singles
- (Belgium) Kim Clijsters

Doubles
- (Belgium) Kim Clijsters / (Slovakia) Janette Husárová
← 2001 ·	Luxembourg Open	· 2003 →

The 2002 SEAT Open was a women's tennis tournament played on indoor hard courts in Kockelscheuer, Luxembourg which was part of Tier III of the 2002 WTA Tour. It was the 7th edition of the tournament and was held from 21 October until 27 October 2002. First-seeded Kim Clijsters won the singles title, her second consecutive title at the event and third in total, and earned $35,000 first-prize money.

== Finals ==
=== Singles ===
(Belgium) Kim Clijsters defeated (Bulgaria) Magdalena Maleeva, 6–1, 6–2

- This was Clijsters' 3rd singles title of the year and the 9th of her career.

=== Doubles ===
(Belgium) Kim Clijsters / (Slovakia) Janette Husárová defeated (Czech Republic) Květa Peschke / (Germany) Barbara Rittner, 4–6, 6–3, 7–5
