= 2003 Acura Classic – Doubles =

Doubles
- 2003 Acura Classic

Final
- Champions: (Belgium) Kim Clijsters (Japan) Ai Sugiyama
- Runners-up: (United States) Lindsay Davenport (United States) Lisa Raymond
- Score: 6–4, 7–5

Details
- Draw: 16 (2WC/1Q)
- Seeds: 4

Events
Singles	Doubles
- Southern California Open

Elena Dementieva and Janette Husárová were the defending champions, but both players competed in this edition with different partners. Dementieva teamed up with Lina Krasnoroutskaya, while Husárová teamed up with Conchita Martínez. Both teams were eliminated by Virginia Ruano Pascual and Paola Suárez in the first round and quarterfinals, respectively.

Kim Clijsters and Ai Sugiyama won the title by defeating Lindsay Davenport and Lisa Raymond 6–4, 7–5 in the final.

== Seeds ==
1. (Spain) Virginia Ruano Pascual / (Argentina) Paola Suárez (semifinals)
2. (Belgium) Kim Clijsters / (Japan) Ai Sugiyama (champions)
3. (United States) Lindsay Davenport / (United States) Lisa Raymond (final)
4. (Zimbabwe) Cara Black / (Russia) Elena Likhovtseva (semifinals)

== Draw ==
Key

- Q = Qualifier
- WC = Wild card
- LL = Lucky loser
- Alt = Alternate
- ITF = ITF entry
- PR = Protected ranking
- SR = Special ranking
- SE = Special exempt
- JE = Junior exempt
- JR = Junior Accelerator Programme entrant
- CO = College Accelerator Programme entrant
- NG = Next Gen Accelerator Program entrant
- w/o = Walkover
- r = Retired
- d = Defaulted

=== Draw ===
First round
1	(Spain) V Ruano Pascual (Argentina) P Suárez	7^{7}	6
(Russia) E Dementieva (Russia) L Krasnoroutskaya	6^{4}	2
(Slovakia) J Husárová (Spain) C Martínez	6	3	6
(Russia) N Petrova (Slovenia) K Srebotnik	3	6	3
3	(United States) L Davenport (United States) L Raymond	6	6
WC	(Argentina) P Tarabini (Netherlands) C Vis	2	1
(Slovenia) T Križan (United States) M Tu	3	3
(South Africa) L Huber (Bulgaria) M Maleeva	6	6
Q	(Italy) S Farina Elia (Austria) B Schett	2	0
(Russia) S Kuznetsova (United States) M Navratilova	6	6
(Federal Republic of Yugoslavia) J Dokic (United States) M Shaughnessy	6	2	1
4	(Zimbabwe) C Black (Russia) E Likhovtseva	3	6	6
WC	(France) M Pierce (Australia) R Stubbs	7	6
(Slovakia) D Hantuchová (United States) C Rubin	5	3
(Venezuela) M Vento-Kabchi (Indonesia) A Widjaja	4	1
2	(Belgium) K Clijsters (Japan) A Sugiyama	6	6

Quarterfinals
1	(Spain) V Ruano Pascual (Argentina) P Suárez	6	6
(Slovakia) J Husárová (Spain) C Martínez	1	1
3	(United States) L Davenport (United States) L Raymond	6	6
(South Africa) L Huber (Bulgaria) M Maleeva	2	1
(Russia) S Kuznetsova (United States) M Navratilova	6	5	1
4	(Zimbabwe) C Black (Russia) E Likhovtseva	3	7	6
WC	(France) M Pierce (Australia) R Stubbs	6	4	3
2	(Belgium) K Clijsters (Japan) A Sugiyama	0	6	6

Semifinals
1	(Spain) V Ruano Pascual (Argentina) P Suárez	6	6^{3}	3
3	(United States) L Davenport (United States) L Raymond	4	7^{7}	6
4	(Zimbabwe) C Black (Russia) E Likhovtseva	1	3
2	(Belgium) K Clijsters (Japan) A Sugiyama	6	6

Final
3	(United States) L Davenport (United States) L Raymond	4	5
2	(Belgium) K Clijsters (Japan) A Sugiyama	6	7
