= 2003 Acura Classic – Singles =

Singles
- 2003 Acura Classic

Final
- Champion: (Belgium) Justine Henin-Hardenne
- Runner-up: (Belgium) Kim Clijsters
- Score: 3–6, 6–2, 6–3

Details
- Draw: 48 (4WC/4Q/3LL)
- Seeds: 16

Events
| Singles | Doubles |
- Southern California Open

Venus Williams was the defending champion, but did not compete this year.

Justine Henin-Hardenne won the title by defeating Kim Clijsters 3–6, 6–2, 6–3 in the final.

== Seeds ==
All seeds received a bye into the second round.

1. (United States) ~~Serena Williams~~ (withdrew due to a left quadriceps strain)
2. (Belgium) Kim Clijsters (final)
3. (Belgium) Justine Henin-Hardenne (champion)
4. (United States) Lindsay Davenport (semifinals)
5. (United States) Jennifer Capriati (second round, retired)
6. (United States) Chanda Rubin (quarterfinals)
7. (Slovakia) Daniela Hantuchová (third round)
8. (Japan) Ai Sugiyama (second round)
9. (Federal Republic of Yugoslavia) Jelena Dokic (third round)
10. (Bulgaria) Magdalena Maleeva (third round)
11. (Spain) Conchita Martínez (second round)
12. (South Africa) Amanda Coetzer (second round)
13. (Russia) Elena Dementieva (third round)
14. (United States) Meghann Shaughnessy (second round)
15. (Italy) Silvia Farina Elia (second round)
16. (Russia) Elena Bovina (third round)

== Draw ==
Key

- Q = Qualifier
- WC = Wild card
- LL = Lucky loser
- Alt = Alternate
- ITF = ITF entry
- PR = Protected ranking
- SR = Special ranking
- SE = Special exempt
- JE = Junior exempt
- JR = Junior Accelerator Programme entrant
- CO = College Accelerator Programme entrant
- NG = Next Gen Accelerator Program entrant
- w/o = Walkover
- r = Retired
- d = Defaulted

=== Finals ===
Quarterfinals
(Russia) Svetlana Kuznetsova | 6 | 6
(Russia) Elena Likhovtseva | 2 | 3
3 | (Belgium) Justine Henin-Hardenne | 6 | 6
(Russia) Nadia Petrova | 0 | 2
6 | (United States) Chanda Rubin | 3 | 3
4 | (United States) Lindsay Davenport | 6 | 6
(United States) Lisa Raymond | 2 | 2
2 | (Belgium) Kim Clijsters | 6 | 6

Semifinals
(Russia) Svetlana Kuznetsova | 1 | 3
3 | (Belgium) Justine Henin-Hardenne | 6 | 6
4 | (United States) Lindsay Davenport | 3 | 3
2 | (Belgium) Kim Clijsters | 6 | 6

Final
3 | (Belgium) Justine Henin-Hardenne | 3 | 6 | 6
2 | (Belgium) Kim Clijsters | 6 | 2 | 3

=== Top half ===
==== Section 1 ====
First round
(Russia) S Kuznetsova | 6 | 6
WC | (United States) Leslie Koffi | 2 | 1
LL | (Australia) N Pratt | 6 | 4 | 6
(Thailand) T Tanasugarn | 3 | 6 | 4
(Australia) A Molik | 4 | 6 | 6
WC | (United States) A Haynes | 6 | 2 | 1
(Russia) E Likhovtseva | 6 | 6
Q | (Japan) S Asagoe | 3 | 1

Second round
LL | (United States) M Tu | 3 | 6 | 6^{3}
(Russia) S Kuznetsova | 6 | 4 | 7^{7}
LL | (Australia) N Pratt | 6 | 3 | 2
16 | (Russia) E Bovina | 4 | 6 | 6
10 | (Bulgaria) M Maleeva | 6 | 6
(Australia) A Molik | 1 | 3
(Russia) E Likhovtseva | 4
5 | (United States) J Capriati | 1^{r}

Third round
(Russia) S Kuznetsova | 7^{7} | 6
16 | (Russia) E Bovina | 6^{4} | 2
10 | (Bulgaria) M Maleeva | 4 | 3
(Russia) E Likhovtseva | 6 | 6

Quarterfinals
(Russia) S Kuznetsova | 6 | 6
(Russia) E Likhovtseva | 2 | 3

==== Section 2 ====
First round
(Italy) R Grande | 5 | 3
(Greece) E Daniilidou | 7 | 6
WC | (Slovakia) J Husárová | 5 | 1
(Italy) F Schiavone | 7 | 6
(Russia) N Petrova | 6 | 3
(Switzerland) MG Mikaelian | 1 | 0^{r}
(Slovenia) K Srebotnik | 6 | 6
(South Korea) Y-j Cho | 3 | 0

Second round
3 | (Belgium) J Henin-Hardenne | 6 | 6
(Greece) E Daniilidou | 1 | 1
(Italy) F Schiavone | 6^{6} | 2
13 | (Russia) E Dementieva | 7^{8} | 6
12 | (South Africa) A Coetzer | 3 | 3
(Russia) N Petrova | 6 | 6
(Slovenia) K Srebotnik | 6 | 5 | 6^{6}
7 | (Slovakia) D Hantuchová | 3 | 7 | 7^{8}

Third round
3 | (Belgium) J Henin-Hardenne | 4 | 6 | 6
13 | (Russia) E Dementieva | 6 | 4 | 1
(Russia) N Petrova | 6 | 6
7 | (Slovakia) D Hantuchová | 1 | 3

Quarterfinals
3 | (Belgium) J Henin-Hardenne | 6 | 6
(Russia) N Petrova | 0 | 2

=== Bottom half ===
==== Section 3 ====
First round
(Slovenia) T Pisnik | 6 | 3 | 7
(Argentina) P Suárez | 2 | 6 | 5
(Spain) M Serna | 6 | 6
(United States) L Granville | 3 | 3
(Russia) L Krasnoroutskaya | 6 | 6
LL | (Japan) S Obata | 4 | 3
(Spain) M Sánchez Lorenzo | 5 | 6^{3}
(United States) A Frazier | 7 | 7^{7}

Second round
6 | (United States) C Rubin | 7 | 6
(Slovenia) T Pisnik | 5 | 0
(Spain) M Serna | 6 | 2 | 3
9 | (Federal Republic of Yugoslavia) J Dokic | 2 | 6 | 6
15 | (Italy) S Farina Elia | 2 | 2
(Russia) L Krasnoroutskaya | 6 | 6
(United States) A Frazier | 3 | 1
4 | (United States) L Davenport | 6 | 6

Third round
6 | (United States) C Rubin | 1 | 6 | 6
9 | (Federal Republic of Yugoslavia) J Dokic | 6 | 3 | 4
(Russia) L Krasnoroutskaya | 0 | 6^{2}
4 | (United States) L Davenport | 6 | 7^{7}

Quarterfinals
6 | (United States) C Rubin | 3 | 3
4 | (United States) L Davenport | 6 | 6

==== Section 4 ====
First round
(Austria) B Schett | 4 | 6 | 5
(United States) L Raymond | 6 | 2 | 7
WC | (France) M Pierce | 6 | 6
Q | (France) V Razzano | 1 | 3
(France) M Bartoli | 7^{7} | 6
Q | (United States) M Irvin | 6^{2} | 4
Q | (Russia) A Jidkova | 6 | 2 | 4
(Spain) V Ruano Pascual | 2 | 6 | 6

Second round
8 | (Japan) A Sugiyama | 0 | 6 | 4
(United States) L Raymond | 6 | 2 | 6
WC | (France) M Pierce | 6 | 6
11 | (Spain) C Martínez | 1 | 3
14 | (United States) M Shaughnessy | 6 | 6^{5} | 5
(France) M Bartoli | 3 | 7^{7} | 7
(Spain) V Ruano Pascual | 2 | 0
2 | (Belgium) K Clijsters | 6 | 6

Third round
(United States) L Raymond | 7^{7} | 6
WC | (France) M Pierce | 6^{5} | 4
(France) M Bartoli | 1 | 1
2 | (Belgium) K Clijsters | 6 | 6

Quarterfinals
(United States) L Raymond | 2 | 2
2 | (Belgium) K Clijsters | 6 | 6
