= 1999 SEAT Open Luxembourg – Singles =

Singles
- 1999 SEAT Open Luxembourg

Final
- Champion: (Belgium) Kim Clijsters
- Runner-up: (Belgium) Dominique Van Roost
- Score: 6–2, 6–2

Details
- Draw: 30
- Seeds: 8

Events
Singles	Doubles
- Luxembourg Open

The 1999 SEAT Open Luxembourg singles was the singles event of the ninth edition of the most prestigious women's tennis tournament held in Luxembourg. Mary Pierce was the reigning champion but she did not compete in this year.

Qualifier Kim Clijsters won in the final, 6–2, 6–2, against top playing seed Dominique Van Roost, to win her first WTA title.

== Seeds ==
1. (United States) Serena Williams (withdrew due to exhaustion)
2. (Belgium) Dominique Van Roost (final)
3. (Czech Republic) Jana Novotná (first round)
4. (Romania) Irina Spîrlea (first round)
5. (Germany) Anke Huber (second round)
6. (Italy) Silvia Farina (quarterfinals)
7. (Austria) Sylvia Plischke (first round)
8. (Luxembourg) Anne Kremer (first round)

== Draw ==
Key

- Q = Qualifier
- WC = Wild card
- LL = Lucky loser
- Alt = Alternate
- ITF = ITF entry
- PR = Protected ranking
- SR = Special ranking
- SE = Special exempt
- JE = Junior exempt
- JR = Junior Accelerator Programme entrant
- CO = College Accelerator Programme entrant
- NG = Next Gen Accelerator Program entrant
- w/o = Walkover
- r = Retired
- d = Defaulted

=== Finals ===
Semifinals
Q	(Belgium) Kim Clijsters	6	6^{7}	6
(Belgium) Sabine Appelmans	2	7^{9}	1
WC	(Russia) Lina Krasnoroutskaya	7	3	1
2	(Belgium) Dominique Van Roost	5	6	6

Final
Q	(Belgium) Kim Clijsters	6	6
2	(Belgium) Dominique Van Roost	2	2

=== Top half ===
First round
(Austria) B Schwartz	6	6^{7}	6
(Spain) M Serna	3	7^{9}	3
Q	(Belgium) K Clijsters	6	6
(Slovenia) K Srebotnik	1	1
(Germany) M Weingärtner	0	0^{r}
5	(Germany) A Huber	6	5
4	(Romania) I Spîrlea	5	6^{3}
(Belgium) S Appelmans	7	7^{7}
(Belgium) L Courtois	5	5
(Czech Republic) D Chládková	7	7
WC	(Belgium) J Henin	6	6
(Czech Republic) K Hrdličková	2	2
Q	(Croatia) J Kostanić	6	6
7	(Austria) S Plischke	2	2

Second round
LL	(Belgium) E Callens	7^{8}	6
(Austria) B Schwartz	6^{6}	3
Q	(Belgium) K Clijsters	6	6
5	(Germany) A Huber	1	4
(Belgium) S Appelmans	6	6
(Czech Republic) D Chládková	3	4
WC	(Belgium) J Henin	6	2	6
Q	(Croatia) J Kostanić	0	6	1

Quarterfinals
LL	(Belgium) E Callens	4	4
Q	(Belgium) K Clijsters	6	6
(Belgium) S Appelmans	6	6
WC	(Belgium) J Henin	4	3

Semifinals
Q	(Belgium) K Clijsters	6	6^{7}	6
(Belgium) S Appelmans	2	7^{9}	1

=== Bottom half ===
First round
6	(Italy) S Farina	6	6
WC	(Netherlands) M Oremans	4	2
(Germany) B Rittner	5	4
(France) S Pitkowski	7	6
WC	(Russia) L Krasnoroutskaya	6	6
(Ukraine) E Tatarkova	3	1
Q	(Bulgaria) M Maleeva	6	6^{7}	6
3	(Czech Republic) J Novotná	1	7^{9}	3
8	(Luxembourg) A Kremer	4	4
(Italy) R Grande	6	6
Q	(Slovenia) T Pisnik	6	6
(France) A Dechaume-Balleret	2	3
(Spain) C Torrens Valero	3	3
(France) A-G Sidot	6	6

Second round
6	(Italy) S Farina	6	6
(France) S Pitkowski	1	4
WC	(Russia) L Krasnoroutskaya	1	7	6
Q	(Bulgaria) M Maleeva	6	5	2
(Italy) R Grande	6	5	3
Q	(Slovenia) T Pisnik	3	7	6
(France) A-G Sidot	6	4	4
2	(Belgium) D Van Roost	4	6	6

Quarterfinals
6	(Italy) S Farina	6	3	3
WC	(Russia) L Krasnoroutskaya	0	6	6
Q	(Slovenia) T Pisnik	5	3
2	(Belgium) D Van Roost	7	6

Semifinals
WC	(Russia) L Krasnoroutskaya	7	3	1
2	(Belgium) D Van Roost	5	6	6

== Qualifying ==
=== Seeds ===
1. (Czech Republic) Adriana Gerši (second round)
2. (Netherlands) Miriam Oremans (first round)
3. n.a.
4. (Belgium) Kim Clijsters (qualifier)
5. (Belgium) Els Callens (qualifying competition, lucky loser)
6. (Slovenia) Tina Pisnik (qualifier)
7. (Croatia) Jelena Kostanić (qualifier)
8. n.a.
9. (Slovenia) Tina Križan (second round)
10. (Romania) Raluca Sandu (first round)

=== Qualifiers ===
1. (Bulgaria) Magdalena Maleeva
2. (Belgium) Kim Clijsters
3. (Croatia) Jelena Kostanić
4. (Slovenia) Tina Pisnik

== Qualifying draw ==
Key

- Q = Qualifier
- WC = Wild card
- LL = Lucky loser
- Alt = Alternate
- ITF = ITF entry
- PR = Protected ranking
- SR = Special ranking
- SE = Special exempt
- JE = Junior exempt
- JR = Junior Accelerator Programme entrant
- CO = College Accelerator Programme entrant
- NG = Next Gen Accelerator Program entrant
- w/o = Walkover
- r = Retired
- d = Defaulted

=== First qualifier ===
First round
1	(Czech Republic) Adriana Gerši	6	6
(Germany) Denise Hofer	3	2
WC	(Bulgaria) Magdalena Maleeva	6	6
(Germany) Jana Kandarr	1	2
(Poland) Agnieszka Abram	6	6
WC	(Luxembourg) Fabienne Thill	3	4
(Austria) Sybille Bammer	4	2
5	(Belgium) Els Callens	6	6

Second round
1	(Czech Republic) Adriana Gerši	6	1	3
WC	(Bulgaria) Magdalena Maleeva	3	6	6
(Poland) Agnieszka Abram	1	0
5	(Belgium) Els Callens	6	6

Qualifying competition
WC	(Bulgaria) Magdalena Maleeva	6	6
5	(Belgium) Els Callens	4	4

=== Second qualifier ===
First round
4	(Belgium) Kim Clijsters	6	6
(Germany) Lisa Fritz	2	1
(France) Sophie Lefèvre	2	4
WC	(Luxembourg) Claudine Schaul	6	6
(United States) Linda Wild	6	6
(Germany) Miriam Schnitzer	3	2
(Belgium) Daphne van de Zande	4	2
9	(Slovenia) Tina Križan	6	6

Second round
4	(Belgium) Kim Clijsters	6	6
WC	(Luxembourg) Claudine Schaul	2	1
(United States) Linda Wild	6	6
9	(Slovenia) Tina Križan	4	3

Qualifying competition
4	(Belgium) Kim Clijsters	6	6
(United States) Linda Wild	1	1

=== Third qualifier ===
First round
7	(Croatia) Jelena Kostanić	6	6
(France) Laurence Andretto	2	4
WC	(United Kingdom) Alice Barnes	4	4
(Germany) Angelika Bachmann	6	6
(United Kingdom) Lorna Woodroffe	6	4	2
(France) Lea Ghirardi	2	6	6
(Germany) Kirstin Freye	6	6
10	(Romania) Raluca Sandu	1	0

Second round
7	(Croatia) Jelena Kostanić	6	7
(Germany) Angelika Bachmann	1	5
(France) Lea Ghirardi	6	3	4
(Germany) Kirstin Freye	4	6	6

Qualifying competition
7	(Croatia) Jelena Kostanić	6	2
(Germany) Kirstin Freye	2	0^{r}

=== Fourth qualifier ===
First round
6	(Slovenia) Tina Pisnik	6	6
(Czech Republic) Renata Kučerová	4	4
WC	(United Kingdom) Karen Cross	5	7	1
(Belgium) Patty Van Acker	7	5	6
(Germany) Martina Müller	6	7
(Spain) Ana Salas Lozano	3	5
(France) Alexandra Fusai	6	6
2	(Netherlands) Amanda Hopmans	3	1

Second round
6	(Slovenia) Tina Pisnik	6	6
(Belgium) Patty Van Acker	4	3
(Germany) Martina Müller	1	2
(France) Alexandra Fusai	6	6

Qualifying competition
6	(Slovenia) Tina Pisnik	1	6	6
(France) Alexandra Fusai	6	1	4
