= 2000 SEAT Open – Singles =

Singles
- 2000 SEAT Open

Final
- Champion: (United States) Jennifer Capriati
- Runner-up: (Bulgaria) Magdalena Maleeva
- Score: 4–6, 6–1, 6–4

Details
- Draw: 30 (3WC/4Q/2LL)
- Seeds: 8

Events
Singles	Doubles
← 1999 ·	Luxembourg Open	· 2001 →

Kim Clijsters was the defending champion, but lost in the quarterfinals to Anna Kournikova.

Jennifer Capriati won the title by defeating Magdalena Maleeva 4–6, 6–1, 6–4 in the final.

== Seeds ==
The first two seeds received a bye into the second round.

1. (France) Nathalie Tauziat (second round)
2. (Russia) Anna Kournikova (semifinals)
3. (United States) Jennifer Capriati (champion)
4. (Switzerland) Patty Schnyder (quarterfinals)
5. (Belgium) Kim Clijsters (quarterfinals)
6. (France) Anne-Gaëlle Sidot (quarterfinals)
7. (Bulgaria) Magdalena Maleeva (final)
8. (Belgium) Justine Henin (second round)

== Draw ==
=== Key ===
- Q = Qualifier
- WC = Wild card
- LL = Lucky loser
- Alt = Alternate
- SE = Special exempt
- PR = Protected ranking
- ITF = ITF entry
- JE = Junior exempt
- w/o = Walkover
- r = Retired
- d = Defaulted
- SR = Special ranking

=== Finals ===
Semifinals
WC	(Germany) Barbara Rittner	4	6	2
3	(United States) Jennifer Capriati	6	2	6
7	(Bulgaria) Magdalena Maleeva	6	6
2	(Russia) Anna Kournikova	2	4

Final
3	(United States) Jennifer Capriati	4	6	6
7	(Bulgaria) Magdalena Maleeva	6	1	4

=== Top half ===
First round
WC	(France) V Razzano	6	4	2
(Slovakia) D Hantuchová	1	6	6
(Sweden) Å Carlsson	4	2
WC	(Germany) B Rittner	6	6
(Spain) C Torrens Valero	2	6^{5}
8	(Belgium) J Henin	6	7^{7}
3	(United States) J Capriati	6	6
(Croatia) J Kostanić	4	2
(United States) E deLone	6^{6}	3
(Spain) M Sánchez Lorenzo	7^{8}	6
(Switzerland) E Gagliardi	3	5
(Bulgaria) L Bacheva	6	7
Q	(United Kingdom) L Latimer	1	4
6	(France) AG Sidot	6	6

Second round
1	(France) N Tauziat	6	3	4
(Slovakia) D Hantuchová	2	6	6
WC	(Germany) B Rittner	4	6	6
8	(Belgium) J Henin	6	2	3
3	(United States) J Capriati	6	7
(Spain) M Sánchez Lorenzo	2	5
(Bulgaria) L Bacheva	3	1
6	(France) AG Sidot	6	6

Quarterfinals
(Slovakia) D Hantuchová	7^{7}	1	2
WC	(Germany) B Rittner	6^{2}	6	6
3	(United States) J Capriati	7	6^{6}	6
6	(France) AG Sidot	5	7^{8}	3

Semifinals
WC	(Germany) B Rittner	4	6	2
3	(United States) J Capriati	6	2	6

=== Bottom half ===
First round
7	(Bulgaria) M Maleeva	6	6
LL	(Romania) C Cristea	2	2
(United States) A Stevenson	7^{8}	5	2
(Slovakia) M Suchá	6^{6}	7	6
LL	(France) A Cocheteux	6	0	4
Q	(France) A Fusai	4	6	6
(United States) J Hopkins	1	2
4	(Switzerland) P Schnyder	6	6
5	(Belgium) K Clijsters	6	1	7
(Czech Republic) D Chládková	4	6	5
WC	(Luxembourg) C Schaul	7	6
Q	(Belarus) T Poutchek	5	4
Q	(Netherlands) Y Basting	2	6	2
(Russia) N Petrova	6	4	6

Second round
7	(Bulgaria) M Maleeva	6	6
(Slovakia) M Suchá	3	4
Q	(France) A Fusai	1	1
4	(Switzerland) P Schnyder	6	6
5	(Belgium) K Clijsters	6	6
WC	(Luxembourg) C Schaul	2	4
(Russia) N Petrova	6	5	1^{r}
2	(Russia) A Kournikova	1	7	4

Quarterfinals
7	(Bulgaria) M Maleeva	6	5	7^{9}
4	(Switzerland) P Schnyder	3	7	6^{7}
5	(Belgium) K Clijsters	7^{7}	3	1
2	(Russia) A Kournikova	6^{1}	6	6

Semifinals
7	(Bulgaria) M Maleeva	6	6
2	(Russia) A Kournikova	2	4
