= 2001 Volvo Women's Open =

- Date: 5–11 November
- Edition: 11th
- Category: Tier V
- Draw: 32S / 16D
- Prize money: $110,000
- Surface: Hard / outdoor
- Location: Pattaya, Thailand

Champions

Singles
- (Switzerland) Patty Schnyder

Doubles
- (Sweden) Åsa Svensson / (Uzbekistan) Iroda Tulyaganova
- Pattaya Women's Open

The 2001 Volvo Women's Open was a women's tennis tournament played on outdoor hard courts in Pattaya, Thailand. It was part of Tier V of the 2001 WTA Tour. It was the 11th edition of the tournament and was held from 5 November through 11 November 2001. Seventh-seeded Patty Schnyder won the singles title and earned $16,000 first-prize money.

== Finals ==
=== Singles ===
(Switzerland) Patty Schnyder defeated (Slovakia) Henrieta Nagyová, 6–0, 6–4

- This was Schnyder's 1st singles title of the year and the 7th of her career.

=== Doubles ===
(Sweden) Åsa Carlsson / (Uzbekistan) Iroda Tulyaganova defeated (South Africa) Liezel Huber / (Indonesia) Wynne Prakusya, 4–6, 6–3, 6–3
