= 2002 ASB Bank Classic – Singles =

Singles
- 2002 ASB Bank Classic

Final
- Champion: (Israel) Anna Smashnova
- Runner-up: (Russia) Tatiana Panova
- Score: 6–2, 6–2

Details
- Draw: 32 (2WC/4Q)
- Seeds: 8

Events
Singles	Doubles
- WTA Auckland Open

Meilen Tu was the defending champion, but lost in the first round to Selima Sfar.

Anna Smashnova won the title by defeating Tatiana Panova 6–2, 6–2 in the final.

== Seeds ==
1. (Spain) Ángeles Montolio (first round)
2. (Slovakia) Henrieta Nagyová (second round)
3. (Luxembourg) Anne Kremer (quarterfinals)
4. (Spain) Conchita Martínez (first round)
5. (Russia) Tatiana Panova (final)
6. (United States) Meilen Tu (first round)
7. (United States) Amy Frazier (second round)
8. (Argentina) Mariana Díaz Oliva (first round)

== Draw ==
Key

- Q = Qualifier
- WC = Wild card
- LL = Lucky loser
- Alt = Alternate
- ITF = ITF entry
- PR = Protected ranking
- SR = Special ranking
- SE = Special exempt
- JE = Junior exempt
- JR = Junior Accelerator Programme entrant
- CO = College Accelerator Programme entrant
- NG = Next Gen Accelerator Program entrant
- w/o = Walkover
- r = Retired
- d = Defaulted

=== Finals ===
Semifinals
(Israel) Anna Smashnova	6	6
(Russia) Anna Kournikova	1	4
5	(Russia) Tatiana Panova	6	6
Q	(Croatia) Silvija Talaja	3	2

Final
(Israel) Anna Smashnova	6	6
5	(Russia) Tatiana Panova	2	2

=== Top half ===
First round
1	(Spain) Á Montolio	3	1
(Russia) A Jidkova	6	6
(Israel) A Smashnova	6	6
(Australia) R McQuillan	4	1
(Spain) A Medina Garrigues	6	6
(Japan) M Saeki	0	1
(Tunisia) S Sfar	6	6
6	(United States) M Tu	3	2
4	(Spain) C Martínez	6^{5}	3
(United States) K Brandi	7^{7}	6
(Slovakia) J Husárová	1	1
(Switzerland) E Gagliardi	6	6
(Russia) A Kournikova	7^{8}	6
(Zimbabwe) C Black	6^{6}	2
(Slovakia) M Suchá	6	1	0
7	(United States) A Frazier	3	6	6

Second round
(Russia) A Jidkova	5	1
(Israel) A Smashnova	7	6
(Spain) A Medina Garrigues	6	7
(Tunisia) S Sfar	3	5
(United States) K Brandi	6	2	3
(Switzerland) E Gagliardi	2	6	6
(Russia) A Kournikova	6	6
7	(United States) A Frazier	4	1

Quarterfinals
(Israel) A Smashnova	6	6
(Spain) A Medina Garrigues	2	2
(Switzerland) E Gagliardi	6	4	5
(Russia) A Kournikova	2	6	7

Semifinals
(Israel) A Smashnova	6	6
(Russia) A Kournikova	1	4

=== Bottom half ===
First round
5	(Russia) T Panova	7^{7}	6
Q	(Netherlands) S Noorlander	6^{4}	3
(Venezuela) M Sequera	2	7^{7}	0
(United States) J Hopkins	6	6^{5}	6
Q	(Austria) B Schwartz	6	6
WC	(New Zealand) S Stephens	2	1
WC	(New Zealand) P Nola	2	3
3	(Luxembourg) A Kremer	6	6
8	(Argentina) M Díaz Oliva	6^{5}	5
Q	(Croatia) S Talaja	7^{7}	7
(Slovenia) M Matevžič	2	6	6
(Italy) Ad Serra Zanetti	6	3	4
(Belarus) T Poutchek	6	6
Q	(Canada) MÈ Pelletier	2	1
(Czech Republic) K Hrdličková	5	2
2	(Slovakia) H Negyová	7	6

Second round
5	(Russia) T Panova	6	6
(United States) J Hopkins	4	2
Q	(Austria) B Schwartz	2	4
3	(Luxembourg) A Kremer	6	6
Q	(Croatia) S Talaja	6	3	6
(Slovenia) M Matevžič	4	6	2
(Belarus) T Poutchek	7	6
2	(Slovakia) H Negyová	5	3

Quarterfinals
5	(Russia) T Panova	7^{9}	7
3	(Luxembourg) A Kremer	6^{7}	5
Q	(Croatia) S Talaja	6	7
(Belarus) T Poutchek	4	5

Semifinals
5	(Russia) T Panova	6	6
Q	(Croatia) S Talaja	3	2
