= 2001 SEAT Open – Doubles =

Doubles
- 2001 SEAT Open

Final
- Champions: (Russia) Elena Bovina (Slovakia) Daniela Hantuchová
- Runners-up: (Germany) Bianka Lamade (Switzerland) Patty Schnyder
- Score: 6–3, 6–3

Details
- Draw: 16 (1WC/1Q)
- Seeds: 4

Events
Singles	Doubles
← 2000 ·	Luxembourg Open	· 2002 →

Alexandra Fusai and Nathalie Tauziat were the defending champions, but Tauziat did not compete this year. Fusai teamed up with Rita Grande and lost in the first round to Anne Kremer and Virginie Razzano.

Elena Bovina and Daniela Hantuchová won the title by defeating Bianka Lamade and Patty Schnyder 6–3, 6–3 in the final.

== Seeds ==
1. (France) Alexandra Fusai / (Italy) Rita Grande (first round)
2. (South Africa) Amanda Coetzer / (United States) Lori McNeil (quarterfinals)
3. (Czech Republic) Květa Hrdličková / (Germany) Barbara Rittner (semifinals)
4. (Netherlands) Kristie Boogert / (Netherlands) Miriam Oremans (first round)

== Draw ==
Key

- Q = Qualifier
- WC = Wild card
- LL = Lucky loser
- Alt = Alternate
- ITF = ITF entry
- PR = Protected ranking
- SR = Special ranking
- SE = Special exempt
- JE = Junior exempt
- JR = Junior Accelerator Programme entrant
- CO = College Accelerator Programme entrant
- NG = Next Gen Accelerator Program entrant
- w/o = Walkover
- r = Retired
- d = Defaulted

=== Draw ===
First round
1	(France) A Fusai (Italy) R Grande	6^{5}	3
WC	(Luxembourg) A Kremer (France) V Razzano	7^{7}	6
(Spain) M Marrero (Spain) A Medina Garrigues	6	6
(Japan) R Fujiwara (Venezuela) M Vento-Kabchi	2	2
4	(Netherlands) K Boogert (Netherlands) M Oremans	4	7	6^{5}
(Germany) B Lamade (Switzerland) P Schnyder	6	5	7^{7}
(Argentina) ME Salerni (Argentina) P Tarabini	5	1
(France) N Dechy (United States) M Tu	7	6
Q	(South Africa) N Grandin (United States) A Spears	1	6	6
(United States) L Osterloh (Germany) C Schneider	6	2	0
(Belgium) L Courtois (Germany) A Glass	6^{2}	1
3	(Czech Republic) K Hrdličková (Germany) B Rittner	7^{7}	6
(Bulgaria) L Bacheva (Greece) E Daniilidou	3	5
(Russia) E Bovina (Slovakia) D Hantuchová	6	7
(Belarus) T Poutchek (Russia) A Rodionova	5	0
2	(South Africa) A Coetzer (United States) L McNeil	7	6

Quarterfinals
WC	(Luxembourg) A Kremer (France) V Razzano	4	6	6^{2}
(Spain) M Marrero (Spain) A Medina Garrigues	6	4	7^{7}
(Germany) B Lamade (Switzerland) P Schnyder	6	6
(France) N Dechy (United States) M Tu	4	3
Q	(South Africa) N Grandin (United States) A Spears	4	3
3	(Czech Republic) K Hrdličková (Germany) B Rittner	6	6
(Russia) E Bovina (Slovakia) D Hantuchová	4	6	7
2	(South Africa) A Coetzer (United States) L McNeil	6	3	5

Semifinals
(Spain) M Marrero (Spain) A Medina Garrigues	5	3
(Germany) B Lamade (Switzerland) P Schnyder	7	6
3	(Czech Republic) K Hrdličková (Germany) B Rittner	5	5
(Russia) E Bovina (Slovakia) D Hantuchová	7	7

Final
(Germany) B Lamade (Switzerland) P Schnyder	3	3
(Russia) E Bovina (Slovakia) D Hantuchová	6	6
