= 2002 SEAT Open – Doubles =

Doubles
- 2002 SEAT Open

Final
- Champions: (Belgium) Kim Clijsters (Slovakia) Janette Husárová
- Runners-up: (Czech Republic) Květa Hrdličková (Germany) Barbara Rittner
- Score: 4–6, 6–3, 7–5

Details
- Draw: 16 (1WC/1Q/1LL)
- Seeds: 4

Events
| Singles | Doubles |
| ← 2001 · | Luxembourg Open | · 2003 → |

Elena Bovina and Daniela Hantuchová were the defending champions, but none competed this year. Bovina decided to focus on the singles tournament, while Hantuchová competed in Linz at the same week.

Kim Clijsters and Janette Husárová won the title by defeating Květa Hrdličková and Barbara Rittner 4–6, 6–3, 7–5 in the final.

== Seeds ==
1. (Zimbabwe) ~~Cara Black~~ / (Russia) ~~Elena Likhovtseva~~ (withdrew)
2. (Belgium) Kim Clijsters / (Slovakia) Janette Husárová (champions)
3. (France) Nathalie Dechy / (United States) Meilen Tu (first round, retired)
4. (Slovenia) Tina Križan / (Slovenia) Katarina Srebotnik (semifinals)

== Draw ==
Key

- Q = Qualifier
- WC = Wild card
- LL = Lucky loser
- Alt = Alternate
- ITF = ITF entry
- PR = Protected ranking
- SR = Special ranking
- SE = Special exempt
- JE = Junior exempt
- JR = Junior Accelerator Programme entrant
- CO = College Accelerator Programme entrant
- NG = Next Gen Accelerator Program entrant
- w/o = Walkover
- r = Retired
- d = Defaulted

=== Draw ===
First round
LL | (Bulgaria) L Bacheva (Hungary) Z Gubacsi | 1 | 6 | 3
(Germany) K Freye (Italy) Ad Serra Zanetti | 6 | 4 | 6
(Netherlands) K Boogert (Spain) M Serna | 6 | 6
(United States) J Hopkins (Australia) A Molik | 2 | 2
3 | (France) N Dechy (United States) M Tu | 3 | 3^{r}
(Australia) C Barclay (Germany) M Müller | 6 | 0
(Czech Republic) K Hrdličková (Germany) B Rittner | 6 | 6
WC | (Luxembourg) A Kremer (France) V Razzano | 4 | 3
(Switzerland) E Gagliardi (Slovakia) H Nagyová
Q | (United States) L Osterloh (Germany) C Schneider | w/o
(Russia) G Fokina (Germany) A Glass | 0 | 3
4 | (Slovenia) T Križan (Slovenia) K Srebotnik | 6 | 6
(South Africa) K Grant (Argentina) ME Salerni | 4 | 4
(Italy) R Grande (Bulgaria) M Maleeva | 6 | 6
(France) A Fusai (France) É Loit | 6^{9} | 1
2 | (Belgium) K Clijsters (Slovakia) J Husárová | 7^{11} | 6

Quarterfinals
(Germany) K Freye (Italy) Ad Serra Zanetti | 2 | 1
(Netherlands) K Boogert (Spain) M Serna | 6 | 6
(Australia) C Barclay (Germany) M Müller | 2 | 2
(Czech Republic) K Hrdličková (Germany) B Rittner | 6 | 6
Q | (United States) L Osterloh (Germany) C Schneider | 0 | 1
4 | (Slovenia) T Križan (Slovenia) K Srebotnik | 6 | 6
(Italy) R Grande (Bulgaria) M Maleeva | 3 | 3
2 | (Belgium) K Clijsters (Slovakia) J Husárová | 6 | 6

Semifinals
(Netherlands) K Boogert (Spain) M Serna | 4 | 6 | 2
(Czech Republic) K Hrdličková (Germany) B Rittner | 6 | 3 | 6
4 | (Slovenia) T Križan (Slovenia) K Srebotnik | 1 | 1
2 | (Belgium) K Clijsters (Slovakia) J Husárová | 6 | 6

Final
(Czech Republic) K Hrdličková (Germany) B Rittner | 6 | 3 | 5
2 | (Belgium) K Clijsters (Slovakia) J Husárová | 4 | 6 | 7
