= 2002 SEAT Open – Singles =

Singles
- 2002 SEAT Open

Final
- Champion: (Belgium) Kim Clijsters
- Runner-up: (Bulgaria) Magdalena Maleeva
- Score: 6–1, 6–2

Details
- Draw: 30 (4WC/3Q/1LL)
- Seeds: 8

Events
Singles	Doubles
← 2001 ·	Luxembourg Open	· 2003 →

Kim Clijsters was the defending champion and successfully defended her title, by defeating Magdalena Maleeva 6–1, 6–2 in the final.

== Seeds ==
The first two seeds received a bye into the second round.

1. (Belgium) Kim Clijsters (champion)
2. (Bulgaria) Magdalena Maleeva (final)
3. (South Africa) Amanda Coetzer (second round)
4. (France) Nathalie Dechy (first round, retired)
5. (United States) Lisa Raymond (second round)
6. (Luxembourg) Anne Kremer (second round)
7. (Russia) Elena Bovina (quarterfinals)
8. (Slovakia) Janette Husárová (quarterfinals)

== Draw ==
Key

- Q = Qualifier
- WC = Wild card
- LL = Lucky loser
- Alt = Alternate
- ITF = ITF entry
- PR = Protected ranking
- SR = Special ranking
- SE = Special exempt
- JE = Junior exempt
- JR = Junior Accelerator Programme entrant
- CO = College Accelerator Programme entrant
- NG = Next Gen Accelerator Program entrant
- w/o = Walkover
- r = Retired
- d = Defaulted

=== Finals ===
Semifinals
1	(Belgium) Kim Clijsters	6	6
LL	(France) Virginie Razzano	3	0
(Slovenia) Katarina Srebotnik	5	6	3
2	(Bulgaria) Magdalena Maleeva	7	4	6

Final
1	(Belgium) Kim Clijsters	6	6
2	(Bulgaria) Magdalena Maleeva	1	2

=== Top half ===
First round
(Canada) MÈ Pelletier	3	6	4
Q	(Spain) M Serna	6	4	6
(Spain) A Sánchez Vicario	3	1
(United States) L Granville	6	6
WC	(Argentina) ME Salerni	5	3
6	(Luxembourg) A Kremer	7	6
3	(South Africa) A Coetzer	6	7^{7}
Q	(France) S Cohen-Aloro	4	6^{4}
WC	(Germany) B Rittner	6^{6}	1
LL	(France) V Razzano	7^{8}	6
(Italy) R Grande	2	3
(Russia) V Zvonareva	6	6
Q	(France) É Loit	3	1
8	(Slovakia) J Husárová	6	6

Second round
1	(Belgium) K Clijsters	6	6
Q	(Spain) M Serna	3	1
(United States) L Granville	6	7^{7}
6	(Luxembourg) A Kremer	2	6^{2}
3	(South Africa) A Coetzer	3	0
LL	(France) V Razzano	6	6
(Russia) V Zvonareva	2	3
8	(Slovakia) J Husárová	6	6

Quarterfinals
1	(Belgium) K Clijsters	6	6
(United States) L Granville	0	4
LL	(France) V Razzano	7^{8}	6
8	(Slovakia) J Husárová	6^{6}	1

Semifinals
1	(Belgium) K Clijsters	6	6
LL	(France) V Razzano	3	0

=== Bottom half ===
First round
5	(United States) L Raymond	7	6
(Belarus) N Ostrovskaya	5	4
(Slovenia) T Pisnik	6	4
(Slovakia) H Nagyová	1	1^{r}
(Zimbabwe) C Black	6	1	2
Q	(Italy) An Serra Zanetti	3	6	6
(Slovenia) K Srebotnik	1	6	0
4	(France) N Dechy	6	4	0^{r}
7	(Russia) E Bovina	7^{7}	6
(Switzerland) E Gagliardi	6^{5}	1
(Italy) Ad Serra Zanetti	6	3	1
(United States) A Frazier	3	6	6
(Russia) E Likhovtseva	2^{r}
WC	(Luxembourg) C Schaul	5

Second round
5	(United States) L Raymond	6^{4}	2
(Slovenia) T Pisnik	7^{7}	6
Q	(Italy) An Serra Zanetti	4	2
(Slovenia) K Srebotnik	6	6
7	(Russia) E Bovina	7^{7}	7
(United States) A Frazier	6^{5}	5
WC	(Luxembourg) C Schaul	3	5
2	(Bulgaria) M Maleeva	6	7

Quarterfinals
(Slovenia) T Pisnik	4	3
(Slovenia) K Srebotnik	6	6
7	(Russia) E Bovina	3	6	3
2	(Bulgaria) M Maleeva	6	4	6

Semifinals
(Slovenia) K Srebotnik	5	6	3
2	(Bulgaria) M Maleeva	7	4	6
