= 2001 SEAT Open – Singles =

Singles
- 2001 SEAT Open

Final
- Champion: (Belgium) Kim Clijsters
- Runner-up: (United States) Lisa Raymond
- Score: 6–2, 6–2

Details
- Draw: 30 (2WC/4Q)
- Seeds: 8

Events
Singles	Doubles
← 2000 ·	Luxembourg Open	· 2002 →

Jennifer Capriati was the defending champion, but decided to rest in order to compete in the WTA Tour Championships.

Kim Clijsters won the title by defeating Lisa Raymond 6–2, 6–2 in the final.

== Seeds ==
The first two seeds received a bye into the second round.

1. (Belgium) Kim Clijsters (champion)
2. (Italy) Silvia Farina Elia (second round)
3. (South Africa) Amanda Coetzer (semifinals)
4. (Germany) Anke Huber (quarterfinals)
5. (Russia) Anna Kournikova (quarterfinals)
6. (United States) Lisa Raymond (final)
7. (Luxembourg) Anne Kremer (first round)
8. (Italy) Francesca Schiavone (first round)

== Draw ==
Key

- Q = Qualifier
- WC = Wild card
- LL = Lucky loser
- Alt = Alternate
- ITF = ITF entry
- PR = Protected ranking
- SR = Special ranking
- SE = Special exempt
- JE = Junior exempt
- JR = Junior Accelerator Programme entrant
- CO = College Accelerator Programme entrant
- NG = Next Gen Accelerator Program entrant
- w/o = Walkover
- r = Retired
- d = Defaulted

=== Finals ===
Semifinals
1	(Belgium) Kim Clijsters	6	6
3	(South Africa) Amanda Coetzer	3	4
6	(United States) Lisa Raymond	6	6
Q	(Slovenia) Tina Pisnik	2	0

Final
1	(Belgium) Kim Clijsters	6	6
6	(United States) Lisa Raymond	2	2

=== Top half ===
First round
Q	(Belarus) T Poutchek	1	2
(Italy) R Grande	6	6
Q	(Germany) A Glass	4	3
(Slovakia) D Hantuchová	6	6
(Germany) J Kandarr	4	5
5	(Russia) A Kournikova	6	7
3	(South Africa) A Coetzer	6	6
(Germany) B Rittner	2	2
(Spain) G León García	6^{7}	0
(Switzerland) P Schnyder	7^{9}	6
(Czech Republic) K Hrdličková	6	6
(United States) L Osterloh	2	2
(Bulgaria) L Bacheva	7^{7}	6
8	(Italy) F Schiavone	6^{4}	2

Second round
1	(Belgium) K Clijsters	6	6
(Italy) R Grande	3	2
(Slovakia) D Hantuchová	1	6^{4}
5	(Russia) A Kournikova	6	7^{7}
3	(South Africa) A Coetzer	6	3	6
(Switzerland) P Schnyder	4	6	1
(Czech Republic) K Hrdličková	7^{7}	6
(Bulgaria) L Bacheva	6^{3}	3

Quarterfinals
1	(Belgium) K Clijsters	7	7^{7}
5	(Russia) A Kournikova	5	6^{2}
3	(South Africa) A Coetzer	3	7^{7}	7^{7}
(Czech Republic) K Hrdličková	6	6^{2}	6^{3}

Semifinals
1	(Belgium) K Clijsters	6	6
3	(South Africa) A Coetzer	3	4

=== Bottom half ===
First round
6	(United States) L Raymond	6	2	6
(Spain) M Marrero	2	6	4
Q	(Argentina) ME Salerni	6^{6}	2
(Spain) A Medina Garrigues	7^{8}	6
(Zimbabwe) C Black	6	6
(Russia) E Bovina	4	0
(France) N Dechy	1	3
4	(Germany) A Huber	6	6
7	(Luxembourg) A Kremer	3	3
(United States) M Tu	6	6
WC	(France) V Razzano	2	6	4
(United States) J Hopkins	6	4	6
Q	(Slovenia) T Pisnik	6	6^{9}	6
WC	(Luxembourg) C Schaul	2	7^{11}	1

Second round
6	(United States) L Raymond	6	2	6
(Spain) A Medina Garrigues	3	6	4
(Zimbabwe) C Black	1	1
4	(Germany) A Huber	6	6
(United States) M Tu	6	3	6
(United States) J Hopkins	4	6	3
Q	(Slovenia) T Pisnik	3	6	7^{7}
2	(Italy) S Farina Elia	6	3	6^{0}

Quarterfinals
6	(United States) L Raymond	7^{7}	6
4	(Germany) A Huber	6^{5}	4
(United States) M Tu	6^{1}	6^{5}
Q	(Slovenia) T Pisnik	7^{7}	7^{7}

Semifinals
6	(United States) L Raymond	6	6
Q	(Slovenia) T Pisnik	2	0
