= 2000 SEAT Open – Doubles =

Doubles
- 2000 SEAT Open

Final
- Champions: (France) Alexandra Fusai (France) Nathalie Tauziat
- Runners-up: (Bulgaria) Lubomira Bacheva (Spain) Cristina Torrens Valero
- Score: 6–3, 7–6^{(7–0)}

Details
- Draw: 16 (1WC/1Q/1LL)
- Seeds: 4

Events
Singles	Doubles
← 1999 ·	Luxembourg Open	· 2001 →

Irina Spîrlea and Caroline Vis were the defending champions, but Spîrlea did not compete this year. Vis teamed up with Cătălina Cristea and lost in the first round to Lubomira Bacheva and Cristina Torrens Valero.

Alexandra Fusai and Nathalie Tauziat won the title by defeating Bacheva and Torrens-Valero 6–3, 7–6^{(7–0)} in the final.

== Seeds ==
1. (France) Alexandra Fusai / (France) Nathalie Tauziat (champions)
2. (United States) Kimberly Po / (France) Anne-Gaëlle Sidot (first round)
3. (Romania) Cătălina Cristea / (Netherlands) Caroline Vis (first round)
4. (Belgium) Kim Clijsters / (Belgium) Laurence Courtois (first round, withdrew)

== Draw ==
=== Key ===
- Q = Qualifier
- WC = Wild card
- LL = Lucky loser
- Alt = Alternate
- SE = Special exempt
- PR = Protected ranking
- ITF = ITF entry
- JE = Junior exempt
- w/o = Walkover
- r = Retired
- d = Defaulted
- SR = Special ranking

=== Draw ===
First round
1	(France) A Fusai (France) N Tauziat	6	6
(Germany) B Rittner (Switzerland) P Schnyder	2	1
Q	(Luxembourg) C Schaul (Czech Republic) M Zděnovcová	6	3	7^{7}
WC	(Austria) K Schwendt (France) V Razzano	4	6	6^{3}
4	(Belgium) K Clijsters (Belgium) L Courtois
(Germany) A Glass (Germany) B Lamade	w/o
LL	(Netherlands) Y Basting (Germany) M Buric	6^{5}	6	3
(United States) E deLone (Croatia) J Kostanić	7^{7}	3	6
(Federal Republic of Yugoslavia) S Načuk (France) S Pitkowski	1^{r}
(Spain) M Sánchez Lorenzo (Germany) C Schneider	3
(Bulgaria) L Bacheva (Spain) C Torrens Valero	7^{7}	6
3	(Romania) C Cristea (Netherlands) C Vis	6^{4}	4
(Germany) A Bachmann (Germany) J Wöhr	1	4
(United States) J Hopkins (Belarus) T Poutchek	6	6
(Sweden) Å Carlsson (Bulgaria) M Maleeva	7^{7}	6
2	(United States) K Po (France) AG Sidot	6^{5}	2

Quarterfinals
1	(France) A Fusai (France) N Tauziat	6	6
Q	(Luxembourg) C Schaul (Czech Republic) M Zděnovcová	1	4
(Germany) A Glass (Germany) B Lamade	6^{3}	6^{5}
(United States) E deLone (Croatia) J Kostanić	7^{7}	7^{7}
(Spain) M Sánchez Lorenzo (Germany) C Schneider	7	3	1
(Bulgaria) L Bacheva (Spain) C Torrens Valero	5	6	6
(United States) J Hopkins (Belarus) T Poutchek	2	0
(Sweden) Å Carlsson (Bulgaria) M Maleeva	6	6

Semifinals
1	(France) A Fusai (France) N Tauziat	6	6
(United States) E deLone (Croatia) J Kostanić	1	2
(Bulgaria) L Bacheva (Spain) C Torrens Valero	w/o
(Sweden) Å Carlsson (Bulgaria) M Maleeva

Final
1	(France) A Fusai (France) N Tauziat	6	7^{7}
(Bulgaria) L Bacheva (Spain) C Torrens Valero	3	6^{0}
