= 2000 Volvo Women's Open – Doubles =

Doubles
- 2000 Volvo Women's Open

Final
- Champions: (Indonesia) Yayuk Basuki (Netherlands) Caroline Vis
- Runners-up: (Slovenia) Tina Križan (Slovenia) Katarina Srebotnik
- Score: 6–3, 6–3

Details
- Draw: 16 (1Q/1WC)
- Seeds: 4

Events
Singles	Doubles
← 1999 ·	Thailand Open	· 2001 →

Émilie Loit and Åsa Carlsson were the defending champions, but Loit did not compete this year. Carlsson teamed up with Silvia Farina Elia and lost in the semifinals to Yayuk Basuki and Caroline Vis.

Basuki and Vis won the title by defeating Tina Križan and Katarina Srebotnik 6–3, 6–3 in the final.

== Seeds ==
1. (Slovenia) Tina Križan / (Slovenia) Katarina Srebotnik (final)
2. (Sweden) Åsa Carlsson / (Italy) Silvia Farina Elia (semifinals)
3. (Japan) Rika Hiraki / (Japan) Yuka Yoshida (quarterfinals)
4. (China) Li Na / (China) Li Ting (first round)

== Draw ==
=== Key ===
- Q = Qualifier
- WC = Wild card
- LL = Lucky loser
- Alt = Alternate
- SE = Special exempt
- PR = Protected ranking
- ITF = ITF entry
- JE = Junior exempt
- w/o = Walkover
- r = Retired
- d = Defaulted
- SR = Special ranking

=== Draw ===
First round
1	(Slovenia) T Križan (Slovenia) K Srebotnik	6	7
Q	(United States) A Augustus (Australia) A Jensen	2	5
(South Africa) L Horn (Canada) V Webb	7^{7}	6
(Australia) T Musgrave (Australia) B Stewart	6^{2}	0
4	(China) N Li (China) T Li	2	6	3
(Russia) E Kulikovskaya (Russia) A Myskina	6	0	6
(Hungary) P Mandula (Austria) P Wartusch	7	6
(Germany) A Bachmann (Denmark) E Dyrberg	5	3
(Indonesia) Y Basuki (Netherlands) C Vis	7^{7}	6
(Czech Republic) R Bobková (Indonesia) W Prakusya	6^{3}	2
WC	(Croatia) I Majoli (Thailand) B Sangaram	6	5	5
3	(Japan) R Hiraki (Japan) Y Yoshida	4	7	7
(Germany) J Kandarr (Croatia) J Kostanić	3	6	3
(Spain) A Ortuño (Austria) S Plischke	6	3	6
(Uzbekistan) I Tulyaganova (Ukraine) A Zaporozhanova	4	6	2
2	(Sweden) Å Carlsson (Italy) S Farina Elia	6	4	6

Quarterfinals
1	(Slovenia) T Križan (Slovenia) K Srebotnik	6	6
(South Africa) L Horn (Canada) V Webb	0	3
(Russia) E Kulikovskaya (Russia) A Myskina	5	4
(Hungary) P Mandula (Austria) P Wartusch	7	6
(Indonesia) Y Basuki (Netherlands) C Vis	7^{8}	7
3	(Japan) R Hiraki (Japan) Y Yoshida	6^{6}	5
(Spain) A Ortuño (Austria) S Plischke	2	4
2	(Sweden) Å Carlsson (Italy) S Farina Elia	6	6

Semifinals
1	(Slovenia) T Križan (Slovenia) K Srebotnik	6	6
(Hungary) P Mandula (Austria) P Wartusch	2	4
(Indonesia) Y Basuki (Netherlands) C Vis	6	6
2	(Sweden) Å Carlsson (Italy) S Farina Elia	3	2

Final
1	(Slovenia) T Križan (Slovenia) K Srebotnik	3	3
(Indonesia) Y Basuki (Netherlands) C Vis	6	6
