= 2000 Volvo Women's Open – Singles =

Singles
- 2000 Volvo Women's Open

Final
- Champion: (Luxembourg) Anne Kremer
- Runner-up: (Russia) Tatiana Panova
- Score: 6–1, 6–4

Details
- Draw: 32 (2WC/4Q/1LL)
- Seeds: 8

Events
Singles	Doubles
← 1999 ·	Thailand Open	· 2001 →

Magdalena Maleeva was the defending champion, but did not compete this year.

Anne Kremer won the title by defeating Tatiana Panova 6–1, 6–4 in the final.

== Seeds ==
1. (Croatia) Silvija Talaja (first round)
2. (Thailand) Tamarine Tanasugarn (quarterfinals)
3. (Luxembourg) Anne Kremer (champion)
4. (Russia) Tatiana Panova (final)
5. (Sweden) Åsa Carlsson (first round)
6. (Russia) Anastasia Myskina (first round)
7. (Austria) Sylvia Plischke (first round)
8. (South Africa) Joannette Kruger (quarterfinals)

== Draw ==
=== Key ===
- Q = Qualifier
- WC = Wild card
- LL = Lucky loser
- Alt = Alternate
- SE = Special exempt
- PR = Protected ranking
- ITF = ITF entry
- JE = Junior exempt
- w/o = Walkover
- r = Retired
- d = Defaulted
- SR = Special ranking

=== Finals ===
Semifinals
(Slovakia) Henrieta Nagyová
4	(Russia) Tatiana Panova	w/o
3	(Luxembourg) Anne Kremer	6	6
(Belarus) Nadejda Ostrovskaya	4	1

Final
4	(Russia) Tatiana Panova	1	4
3	(Luxembourg) Anne Kremer	6	6

=== Top half ===
First round
1	(Croatia) S Talaja	2	1
(Italy) S Farina Elia	6	6
(Germany) M Weingärtner	7	6
(Czech Republic) A Gerši	5	2
(Czech Republic) R Bobková	3	6	3
(Austria) P Wartusch	6	1	6
(Slovakia) H Nagyová	6	6
7	(Austria) S Plischke	3	2
4	(Russia) T Panova	7^{3}	6
(Canada) J Nejedly	6	1
(Belarus) O Barabanschikova	6	4	3
(Czech Republic) S Kleinová	1	6	6
(Canada) V Webb	6	0	6
(China) L Fang	4	6	1
Q	(South Korea) C Yoon-jeong	6	6
(Sweden) Å Svensson	2	1

Second round
(Italy) S Farina Elia	6	6
(Germany) M Weingärtner	3	1
(Austria) P Wartusch	2	'6	4
(Slovakia) H Nagyová	6	4	6
4	(Russia) T Panova	6	6
(Czech Republic) S Kleinová	1	2
(Canada) V Webb	3	7^{6}	6
Q	(South Korea) C Yoon-jeong	6	6	4

Quarterfinals
(Italy) S Farina Elia	3	4
(Slovakia) H Nagyová	6	6
4	(Russia) T Panova	6	6
(Canada) V Webb	2	3

Semifinals
(Slovakia) H Nagyová
4	(Russia) T Panova	w/o

=== Bottom half ===
First round
8	(South Africa) J Kruger	6	6
WC	(Thailand) B Sangaram	2	3
(United States) C Morariu
Q	(Slovenia) K Srebotnik	w/o
Q	(Argentina) M Emilia Salerni	1	6	1
Q	(Croatia) J Kostanić	6	3	6
(China) Y Jing-Qian	3	2
3	(Luxembourg) A Kremer	6	6
6	(Russia) A Myskina	7	0	4
(Belarus) N Ostrovskaya	5	6	6
(Spain) A Medina Garrigues	5	6
(Indonesia) Y Basuki	7	7^{2}
LL	(Uzbekistan) I Tulyaganova	5	4
WC	(Croatia) I Majoli	7	6
(Germany) J Kandarr	3	1
2	(Thailand) T Tanasugarn	6	6

Second round
8	(South Africa) J Kruger	6	4	6
Q	(Slovenia) K Srebotnik	4	6	2
Q	(Croatia) J Kostanić	3	2
3	(Luxembourg) A Kremer	6	6
(Belarus) N Ostrovskaya	6	6
(Indonesia) Y Basuki	4	2
WC	(Croatia) I Majoli	4	3
2	(Thailand) T Tanasugarn	6	6

Quarterfinals
8	(South Africa) J Kruger	4	1
3	(Luxembourg) A Kremer	6	6
(Belarus) N Ostrovskaya	7^{5}	6
2	(Thailand) T Tanasugarn	6	4

Semifinals
3	(Luxembourg) A Kremer	6	6
(Belarus) N Ostrovskaya	4	1
