= 2000 Volvo Women's Open =

- Date: 13–19 November
- Edition: 10th
- Category: Tier IVb
- Draw: 32S / 16D
- Prize money: $110,000
- Surface: Hard / outdoor
- Location: Pattaya, Thailand

Champions

Singles
- (Luxembourg) Anne Kremer

Doubles
- (Indonesia) Yayuk Basuki / (Netherlands) Caroline Vis
- Pattaya Women's Open

The 2000 Volvo Women's Open was a women's tennis tournament played on outdoor hard courts in Pattaya, Thailand. It was part of Tier IVb of the 2000 WTA Tour. It was the 10th edition of the tournament and was held from 13 November through 19 November 2000. Third-seeded Anne Kremer won the singles title and earned $18,000 first-prize money.

== Finals ==
=== Singles ===
(Luxembourg) Anne Kremer defeated (Russia) Tatiana Panova, 6–1, 6–4

- This was Kremer's second singles title of the year and of her career.

=== Doubles ===
(Indonesia) Yayuk Basuki / (Netherlands) Caroline Vis defeated (Slovenia) Tina Križan / (Slovenia) Katarina Srebotnik, 6–3, 6–3
