= 2003 Acura Classic =

- Date: July 28 – August 3
- Edition: 25th
- Category: Tier II
- Draw: 48S / 16D
- Prize money: $1,000,000
- Surface: Hard / outdoor
- Location: San Diego, California, U.S.

Champions

Singles
- (Belgium) Justine Henin-Hardenne

Doubles
- (Belgium) Kim Clijsters / (Japan) Ai Sugiyama
- Southern California Open

The 2003 Acura Classic was a women's tennis tournament played on outdoor hard courts in San Diego in the United States. It was part of Tier II of the 2003 WTA Tour. It was the 25th edition of the tournament and was held from July 28 through August 3, 2003. Third-seeded Justine Henin-Hardenne won her third consecutive singles title at the event and earned $148,000 first-prize money as well as 220 ranking points.

== Finals ==
=== Singles ===
(Belgium) Justine Henin-Hardenne defeated (Belgium) Kim Clijsters, 3–6, 6–2, 6–3

- It was Henin-Hardenne's 5th singles title of the year and the 11th of her career.

=== Doubles ===
(Belgium) Kim Clijsters / (Japan) Ai Sugiyama defeated (United States) Lindsay Davenport / (United States) Lisa Raymond, 6–4, 7–5

- It was Clijsters's 6th title of the year and the 25th of her career. It was Sugiyama's 6th title of the year and the 30th of her career.
