= 2002 ASB Bank Classic =

- Date: 31 December – 5 January
- Edition: 17th
- Category: Tier IV
- Draw: 32S / 16D
- Prize money: $140,000
- Surface: Hard / Outdoor
- Location: Auckland, New Zealand
- Venue: ASB Tennis Centre

Champions

Singles
- (Israel) Anna Smashnova

Doubles
- (United States) Nicole Arendt / (South Africa) Liezel Huber
← 2001 ·	WTA Auckland Open	· 2003 →

The 2002 ASB Bank Classic was a women's tennis tournament played on outdoor hard courts at the ASB Tennis Centre in Auckland, New Zealand, and was part of Tier IV of the 2002 WTA Tour. It was the 17th edition of the tournament and was held from 31 December 2001 until 5 January 2002. Unseeded Anna Smashnova won the singles title and earned $22,000 first-prize money.

== Finals ==
=== Singles ===
(Israel) Anna Smashnova defeated (Russia) Tatiana Panova 6–2, 6–2

- It was Smashnova's 1st singles title of the year and the 3rd of her career.

=== Doubles ===
(United States) Nicole Arendt / (South Africa) Liezel Huber defeated (Czech Republic) Květa Hrdličková / (Slovakia) Henrieta Nagyová 7–5, 6–4

== See also ==
- 2002 Heineken Open – men's tournament
