= 1999 Pattaya Women's Open – Doubles =

Doubles
- 1999 Pattaya Women's Open

Final
- Champions: (France) Émilie Loit (Sweden) Åsa Carlsson
- Runners-up: (Russia) Evgenia Koulikovskaya (Austria) Patricia Wartusch
- Score: 6–1, 6–4

Details
- Draw: 16 (1Q/1WC)
- Seeds: 4

Events
Singles	Doubles
← 1998 ·	Pattaya Women's Open	· 2000 →

The 1999 Pattaya Women's Open doubles was the tennis doubles event of the first edition of the most prestigious tournament in Thailand. Émilie Loit and Åsa Carlsson won the title, in what was both players' first WTA doubles title, over Evgenia Koulikovskaya and Patricia Wartusch.

== Seeds ==
1. (Slovenia) Tina Križan / (Japan) Yuka Yoshida (second round)
2. (France) Émilie Loit / (Sweden) Åsa Carlsson (champions)
3. (Belgium) Laurence Courtois / (Australia) Alicia Molik (semifinals)
4. (Italy) Rita Grande / (United States) Linda Wild (first round)

== Draw ==
=== Key ===
- Q = Qualifier
- WC = Wild card
- LL = Lucky loser
- Alt = Alternate
- SE = Special exempt
- PR = Protected ranking
- ITF = ITF entry
- JE = Junior exempt
- w/o = Walkover
- r = Retired
- d = Defaulted
- SR = Special ranking

First round
1	(Slovenia) T Križan (Japan) Y Yoshida	6	3	7^{10}
WC	(Thailand) B Sangaram (Uzbekistan) I Tulyaganova	1	6	6^{8}
Q	(Chinese Taipei) J Lee (Indonesia) W Prakusya	6	6^{4}	2
(France) A Cocheteux (Slovakia) J Husárová	2	7^{7}	6
4	(Italy) R Grande (United States) L Wild	6	1	1
(Poland) M Grzybowska (Thailand) T Tanasugarn	2	6	6
(Russia) E Koulikovskaya (Austria) P Wartusch	6	6
(Belarus) O Barabanschikova (Australia) N Pratt	2	4
(Germany) C Schneider (Canada) V Webb	2	6	4
(Hungary) V Csurgó (Hungary) K Marosi	6	3	6
(Italy) T Garbin (Romania) A Vanc	3	6	1
3	(Belgium) L Courtois (Australia) A Molik	6	3	6
(Croatia) J Kostanić (Slovenia) T Pisnik	2	6
(United States) E deLone (Australia) A Ellwood	6	1	r
(Netherlands) K Boogert (Luxembourg) A Kremer	1	6	3
2	(France) É Loit (Sweden) Å Carlsson	6	2	6

Quarterfinals
1	(Slovenia) T Križan (Japan) Y Yoshida	2	4
(France) A Cocheteux (Slovakia) J Husárová	6	6
(Poland) M Grzybowska (Thailand) T Tanasugarn	3	6	1
(Russia) E Koulikovskaya (Austria) P Wartusch	6	2	6
(Hungary) V Csurgó (Hungary) K Marosi	4	6	3
3	(Belgium) L Courtois (Australia) A Molik	6	4	6
(Croatia) J Kostanić (Slovenia) T Pisnik	6	2	4
2	(France) É Loit (Sweden) Å Carlsson	4	6	6

Semifinals
(France) A Cocheteux (Slovakia) J Husárová
(Russia) E Koulikovskaya (Austria) P Wartusch	w/o
3	(Belgium) L Courtois (Australia) A Molik	6	2	4
2	(France) É Loit (Sweden) Å Carlsson	4	6	6

Final
(Russia) E Koulikovskaya (Austria) P Wartusch	1	4
2	(France) É Loit (Sweden) Å Carlsson	6	6

== Qualifying ==
=== Seeds ===
1. (Austria) Marion Maruska / (India) Nirupama Vaidyanathan (first round)
2. (South Africa) Kim Grant / (China) Yi Jing-Qian (first round)

=== Qualifiers ===
1. (Chinese Taipei) Janet Lee / (Indonesia) Wynne Prakusya

== Qualifying draw ==
=== Key ===
- Q = Qualifier
- WC = Wild card
- LL = Lucky loser
- Alt = Alternate
- SE = Special exempt
- PR = Protected ranking
- ITF = ITF entry
- JE = Junior exempt
- w/o = Walkover
- r = Retired
- d = Defaulted
- SR = Special ranking

First round
1	(Austria) Marion Maruska (India) Nirupama Vaidyanathan	5
(Russia) Anastasia Myskina (France) Sarah Pitkowski	8
(Japan) Riei Otakeyama (Japan) Yoshiko Sasano	3
(Slovakia) Ľudmila Cervanová (Hungary) Zsófia Gubacsi	8
(Chinese Taipei) Janet Lee (Indonesia) Wynne Prakusya	9
WC	(Thailand) Monthika Anuchan (Thailand) Orawan Wongkamalasai	8
(Czech Republic) Sandra Kleinová (Austria) Sylvia Plischke	8
2	(South Africa) Kim Grant (China) Yi Jing-Qian	3

Second round
(Russia) Anastasia Myskina (France) Sarah Pitkowski	8
(Slovakia) Ľudmila Cervanová (Hungary) Zsófia Gubacsi	5
(Chinese Taipei) Janet Lee (Indonesia) Wynne Prakusya	8
(Czech Republic) Sandra Kleinová (Austria) Sylvia Plischke	6

Qualifying competition
(Russia) Anastasia Myskina (France) Sarah Pitkowski	3
(Chinese Taipei) Janet Lee (Indonesia) Wynne Prakusya	8
