= Kelly Liggan =

Irish tennis player (born 1979)

- Country (sports): Ireland
- Residence: Marbella, Spain
- Born: 5 February 1979 (age 47) Spain
- Retired: 2010
- Plays: Right-handed (two-handed backhand)
- Prize money: $238,274

Singles
- Career record: 290–363
- Career titles: 0 WTA, 4 ITF
- Highest ranking: No. 181 (15 September 2003)

Grand Slam singles results
- Australian Open: Q3 (2001)
- French Open: Q1 (2001, 2004, 2007)
- Wimbledon: Q1 (2002, 2003, 2007)
- US Open: Q3 (2003)

Doubles
- Career record: 145–186
- Career titles: 1 WTA, 7 ITF
- Highest ranking: No. 113 (15 September 2003)

Kelly Liggan (born 5 February 1979) is a retired tennis player from Ireland.

Liggan resides in Marbella, Spain, but she played tennis for Ireland. She had some success on the ITF Women's Circuit winning several titles in both singles and doubles, and in 2002, she won her sole WTA Tour doubles title.

Liggan had two Grand Slam doubles main-draw appearances. She reached the second round at the 2003 US Open and 2004 Wimbledon Championships. She also had several WTA Tour main-draw appearances; however, she never reached a quarterfinal.

Due to nagging injuries, Kelly retired in 2010.

== WTA Tour finals ==
=== Doubles: 1 (title) ===
Result	Date	Tournament	Surface	Partner	Opponents	Score
Win	Nov 2002	Pattaya Open, Thailand	Hard	(Czech Republic) Renata Voráčová	(Russia) Lina Krasnoroutskaya (Russia) Tatiana Panova	7–5, 7–6^{(9–7)}

== ITF Circuit finals ==
$50,000 tournaments
$25,000 tournaments
$10,000 tournaments

=== Singles (4–4) ===
Result	No.	Date	Tournament	Surface	Opponent	Score
Loss	1.	17 May 1999	Elvas, Portugal	Hard	(Argentina) Erica Krauth	1–6, 5–7
Win	1.	25 June 2000	Montreal, Canada	Hard	(United States) Jennifer Embry	6–3, 6–2
Win	2.	2 July 2000	Lachine, Canada	Clay	(Japan) Remi Tezuka	7–5, 6–0
Loss	2.	8 July 2002	Felixstowe, UK	Grass	(United Kingdom) Elena Baltacha	6–4, 2–6, 3–6
Loss	3.	6 June 2006	Madrid, Spain	Hard	(Spain) María José Martínez Sánchez	6–7, 3–6
Win	3.	6 August 2006	Vigo, Spain	Hard	(France) Laura Thorpe	6–1, 6–3
Win	4.	13 August 2006	Coimbra, Portugal	Hard	(Romania) Monica Niculescu	6–0, 7–6^{(9–7)}
Loss	4.	10 July 2007	Boston, United States	Hard	(United States) Varvara Lepchenko	2–6, 7–5, 0–5 ret.

=== Doubles (7–13) ===
Result	No.	Date	Tournament	Surface	Partner	Opponents	Score
Loss	1.	23 June 1997	Manaus, Brazil	Hard	(Germany) Caroline Germar	(United Kingdom) Joanne Moore (Colombia) Ximena Rodríguez	0–6, 2–6
Loss	2.	18 May 1998	Azeméis, Portugal	Hard	(Kazakhstan) Irina Selyutina	(Portugal) Cristina Correia (Brazil) Bruna Colósio	2–6, 4–6
Win	1.	3 August 1998	Périgueux, France	Clay	(Spain) Paula García	(France) Samantha Schoeffel (France) Stéphanie Testard	3–6, 6–3, 7–6^{(7–3)}
Loss	3.	10 August 1998	Open Saint-Gaudens, France	Clay	(Spain) Paula García	(France) Sylvie Sallaberry (France) Aurélie Védy	3–6, 6–7^{(5–7)}
Loss	4.	7 December 1998	Mallorca, Spain	Clay	(Spain) Paula García	(Italy) Katia Altilia (Italy) Giulia Casoni	3–6, 6–7^{(4–7)}
Loss	5.	8 February 1999	Mallorca, Spain	Clay	(France) Emmanuelle Curutchet	(Argentina) María Fernanda Landa (Spain) Ángeles Montolio	6–2, 4–6, 6–7^{(4–7)}
Win	2.	24 May 1999	Guimarães, Portugal	Hard	(Israel) Tzipora Obziler	(Italy) Sabina Da Ponte (Colombia) Giana Gutiérrez	6–3, 6–1
Win	3.	31 May 1999	Azeméis, Portugal	Hard	(Israel) Tzipora Obziler	(Colombia) Mariana Mesa (Argentina) Jorgelina Torti	6–4, 4–6, 7–6^{(8–6)}
Loss	6.	9 October 2000	Mexico City, Mexico	Hard	(Germany) Kirstin Freye	(Brazil) Joana Cortez (Brazil) Vanessa Menga	3–5, 4–5^{(4–6)}, 0–4
Loss	7.	30 October 2000	Hayward, United States	Hard	(Venezuela) Milagros Sequera	(Japan) Nana Smith (India) Nirupama Sanjeev	2–4, 2–4
Loss	8.	5 March 2001	Ortisei, Italy	Hard (i)	(Russia) Ekaterina Kozhokina	(Germany) Angelika Bachmann (Denmark) Eva Dyrberg	6–3, 4–6, 2–6
Loss	9.	12 November 2001	Mexico City, Mexico	Hard	(Czech Republic) Renata Voráčová	(United States) Amanda Augustus (United States) Jennifer Russell	6–7^{(5–7)}, 6–2, 6–7^{(5–7)}
Win	4.	6 May 2002	Edinburgh, UK	Clay	(Spain) Conchita Martínez Granados	(United Kingdom) Victoria Davies (Czech Republic) Eva Martincová	5–7, 6–0, 6–1
Win	5.	22 July 2002	Pamplona, Spain	Hard (i)	(United Kingdom) Elena Baltacha	(Republic of Ireland) Yvonne Doyle (Netherlands) Susanne Trik	6–7^{(6–8)}, 7–6^{(7–1)}, 6–3
Loss	10.	14 July 2003	Oyster Bay, United States	Hard	(United States) Ansley Cargill	(United States) Jennifer Russell (United States) Jessica Lehnhoff	2–6, 3–6
Loss	11.	5 September 2005	Madrid, Spain	Hard	(Netherlands) Seda Noorlander	(Slovenia) Andreja Klepač (Croatia) Nika Ožegović	3–6, 3–6
Loss	12.	12 October 2005	Jersey, United Kingdom	Hard (i)	(Belarus) Nadejda Ostrovskaya	(Czech Republic) Veronika Chvojková (Slovakia) Stanislava Hrozenská	6–4, 2–6, 5–7
Loss	13.	18 October 2005	Mexico City, Mexico	Hard	(Argentina) Soledad Esperón	(Argentina) María José Argeri (Brazil) Letícia Sobral	6–7^{(2–7)}, 6–2, 0–6
Win	6.	25 October 2005	Mexico City, Mexico	Hard	(Argentina) Soledad Esperón	(Cuba) Yamile Fors Guerra (Cuba) Yanet Núñez Mojarena	1–6, 6–4, 6–3
Win	7.	28 February 2006	Clearwater, United States	Hard	(Lithuania) Lina Stančiūtė	(South Africa) Natalie Grandin (South Africa) Chanelle Scheepers	6–3, 6–1
