= Ding Ding (tennis) =

Chinese tennis player

- Country (sports): China
- Born: 17 August 1977 (age 49)
- Prize money: $32,970

Singles
- Career record: 90–63
- Career titles: 2 ITF
- Highest ranking: No. 228 (23 November 1998)

Doubles
- Career record: 53–46
- Career titles: 3 ITF
- Highest ranking: No. 255 (3 August 1998)
Medal record
Representing China
Summer Universiade
| Bronze medal – third place | 1999 Palma de Mallorca | Mixed doubles |

Ding Ding (born 17 August 1977) is a former professional tennis player from China.

Ding played in three Fed Cup ties for China in 1999, which included a win over former world No. 57, Park Sung-hee.

On the professional tour she had a best singles ranking of No. 228 in the world and made the round of 16 at the 1998 Volvo Women's Open in Pattaya, playing as a qualifier.

== ITF finals ==
$25,000 tournaments
$10,000 tournaments

=== Singles (2–4) ===
| Result | No. | Date | Tournament | Surface | Opponent | Score |
|---|---|---|---|---|---|---|
| Win | 1. | 2 March 1998 | New Delhi, India | Hard | (China) Qin Yang | 6–1, 7–5 |
| Loss | 2. | 21 June 1998 | Mount Pleasant, United States | Hard | (Canada) Vanessa Webb | 6–4, 6–7, 2–6 |
| Loss | 3. | 19 July 1998 | Qing Dao, China | Hard | (China) Yi Jing-Qian | 2–6, 3–6 |
| Loss | 4. | 2 April 2000 | Nanjing, China | Hard | (China) Li Na | 2–6, 2–6 |
| Loss | 5. | 17 September 2000 | Hohhot, China | Hard | (China) Sun Tiantian | 4–6, 3–6 |
| Win | 6. | 10 June 2001 | Hohhot, China | Hard | (China) Zheng Jie | 7–5, 3–6, 6–3 |

=== Doubles (3–4) ===
| Result | No. | Date | Tournament | Surface | Partner | Opponents | Score |
|---|---|---|---|---|---|---|---|
| Loss | 1. | 10 August 1997 | Catania, Italy | Clay | (China) Ni Wei | (Italy) Giulia Casoni (Italy) Sabina Da Ponte | 4–6, 2–6 |
| Win | 2. | 10 November 1997 | Manila, Philippines | Hard | (China) Li Ting | (Malaysia) Khoo Chin-bee (Chinese Taipei) Weng Tzu-ting | 7–5, 6–3 |
| Win | 3. | 2 March 1998 | New Delhi, India | Hard | (China) Li Ting | (Japan) Motoe Uchida (China) Qin Yang | 6–3, 6–2 |
| Loss | 4. | 10 May 1998 | Seoul, South Korea | Clay | (China) Li Ting | (South Korea) Cho Yoon-jeong (South Korea) Park Sung-hee | 1–6, 6–3, 2–6 |
| Loss | 5. | 2 April 2000 | Nanjing, China | Hard | (China) Lin Ya-ming | (China) Li Na (China) Li Ting | 1–6, 6–7^{(3–7)} |
| Win | 6. | 23 April 2000 | Dalian, China | Hard | (China) Li Na | (South Korea) Chang Kyung-mi (China) Satoko Kurioka | 7–5, 6–3 |
| Loss | 7. | 17 September 2000 | Hohhot, China | Hard | (China) Tang Yan | (China) Sun Tiantian (China) Chen Yan | 0–6, 3–6 |

== See also ==
- List of China Fed Cup team representatives
