= 1999 SEAT Open =

1999 SEAT Open Luxembourg
- Date: 20–26 September
- Edition: 4th
- Category: Tier III
- Draw: 30S / 16D
- Prize money: $180,000
- Surface: Carpet / indoor
- Venue: Kockelscheuer, Luxembourg

Champions

Singles
- (Belgium) Kim Clijsters

Doubles
- (Romania) Irina Spîrlea / (Netherlands) Caroline Vis
← 1998 ·	Luxembourg Open	· 2000 →

The 1999 SEAT Open was a women's tennis tournament played on indoor carpet courts in Kockelscheuer, Luxembourg which was part of Tier III of the 1999 WTA Tour. It was the fourth edition of the tournament and was held from 20 September until 26 September 1999. Qualifier Kim Clijsters won the singles title and earned $27,000 first-prize money.

== Finals ==
=== Singles ===
(Belgium) Kim Clijsters defeated (Belgium) Dominique Van Roost, 6–2, 6–2

- This was Clijsters' first singles title of her career.

=== Doubles ===
(Romania) Irina Spîrlea / (Netherlands) Caroline Vis defeated (Slovenia) Tina Križan / (Slovenia) Katarina Srebotnik, 6–1, 6–2

== Entrants ==
=== Seeds ===
Country	Player	Rank	Seed
USA	Serena Williams	4	1
BEL	Dominique Van Roost	13	2
CZE	Jana Novotná	18	3
ROU	Irina Spîrlea	19	4
GER	Anke Huber	20	5
ITA	Silvia Farina Elia	26	6
AUT	Sylvia Plischke	29	7
LUX	Anne Kremer	32	8

=== Other entrants ===
The following players received wildcards into the singles main draw:

- (Belgium) Justine Henin
- (Netherlands) Miriam Oremans
- (Russia) Lina Krasnoroutskaya

The following players received wildcards into the doubles main draw:

- (Luxembourg) Claudine Schaul / (Luxembourg) Fabienne Thill

The following players received entry from the singles qualifying draw:

- (Belgium) Kim Clijsters
- (Croatia) Jelena Kostanić
- (Bulgaria) Magdalena Maleeva
- (Slovenia) Tina Pisnik

The following players received entry as lucky losers:

- (Belgium) Els Callens
