= 2002 Volvo Women's Open – Doubles =

Doubles
- 2002 Volvo Women's Open

Final
- Champions: (Republic of Ireland) Kelly Liggan (Czech Republic) Renata Voráčová
- Runners-up: (Russia) Lina Krasnoroutskaya (Russia) Tatiana Panova
- Score: 7–5, 7–6^{(9–7)}

Details
- Draw: 16 (1Q/1WC)
- Seeds: 4

Events
Singles	Doubles
- Thailand Open

Åsa Carlsson and Iroda Tulyaganova were the defending champions, but none competed this year.

Kelly Liggan and Renata Voráčová won the title by defeating Lina Krasnoroutskaya and Tatiana Panova 7–5, 7–6^{(9–7)} in the final.

== Seeds ==
1. (Japan) Shinobu Asagoe / (Australia) Trudi Musgrave (first round)
2. (Paraguay) Rossana de los Ríos / (Belarus) Tatiana Poutchek (first round)
3. (Australia) Alicia Molik / (Italy) Adriana Serra Zanetti (quarterfinals)
4. (Russia) Galina Fokina / (Russia) Anastasia Rodionova (first round)

== Draw ==
Key

- Q = Qualifier
- WC = Wild card
- LL = Lucky loser
- Alt = Alternate
- ITF = ITF entry
- PR = Protected ranking
- SR = Special ranking
- SE = Special exempt
- JE = Junior exempt
- JR = Junior Accelerator Programme entrant
- CO = College Accelerator Programme entrant
- NG = Next Gen Accelerator Program entrant
- w/o = Walkover
- r = Retired
- d = Defaulted

=== Draw ===
First round
1	(Japan) S Asagoe (Australia) T Musgrave	6^{4}	4
(Russia) L Krasnoroutskaya (Russia) T Panova	7^{7}	6
(Ukraine) Y Fedak (Russia) E Kozhokina	6	6
(Thailand) W Choptang (Thailand) S Viratprasert	1	4
3	(Australia) A Molik (Italy) Ad Serra Zanetti	6	1
(Germany) An Barna (France) S Cohen-Aloro	3	0^{r}
(Croatia) S Talaja (Germany) M Weingärtner	6	6
Q	(Armenia) L Nikoyan (Ukraine) J Vakulenko	2	2
(South Korea) Y-j Cho (South Korea) M-r Jeon	6	6
WC	(Thailand) M Thangphong (Thailand) T Vitayaviroj	1	0
(Republic of Ireland) K Liggan (Czech Republic) R Voráčová	6	7^{7}
4	(Russia) G Fokina (Russia) A Rodionova	3	6^{2}
(Hungary) Z Gubacsi (Slovakia) L Bacheva	6	2	4
(Czech Republic) Z Hejdová (Czech Republic) L Průšová	2	6	6
(Thailand) T Tanasugarn (Indonesia) A Widjaja	7	6
2	(Paraguay) R de los Ríos (Belarus) T Panova	5	1

Quarterfinals
(Russia) L Krasnoroutskaya (Russia) T Panova	6	6
(Ukraine) Y Fedak (Russia) E Kozhokina	2	3
3	(Australia) A Molik (Italy) Ad Serra Zanetti	2	4
(Croatia) S Talaja (Germany) M Weingärtner	6	6
(South Korea) Y-j Cho (South Korea) M-r Jeon	2	6^{3}
(Republic of Ireland) K Liggan (Czech Republic) R Voráčová	6	7^{7}
(Czech Republic) Z Hejdová (Czech Republic) L Průšová	6^{4}	5
(Thailand) T Tanasugarn (Indonesia) A Widjaja	7^{7}	7

Semifinals
(Russia) L Krasnoroutskaya (Russia) T Panova	7^{8}	6
(Croatia) S Talaja (Germany) M Weingärtner	6^{6}	2
(Republic of Ireland) K Liggan (Czech Republic) R Voráčová	6	6
(Thailand) T Tanasugarn (Indonesia) A Widjaja	3	3

Final
(Russia) L Krasnoroutskaya (Russia) T Panova	5	6^{7}
(Republic of Ireland) K Liggan (Czech Republic) R Voráčová	7	7^{9}
