= 1998 Volvo Women's Open =

- Date: 16–22 November
- Edition: 8th
- Category: Tier IV
- Draw: 32S / 16D
- Prize money: $107,500
- Surface: Hard / outdoor
- Location: Pattaya, Thailand

Champions

Singles
- (France) Julie Halard-Decugis

Doubles
- (Belgium) Els Callens / (France) Julie Halard-Decugis
← 1997 ·	Volvo Women's Open	· 1999 →

The 1998 Volvo Women's Open was a women's tennis tournament played on outdoor hard courts in Pattaya, Thailand that was part of Tier IV of the 1998 WTA Tour. It was the eighth edition of the tournament and was held from 16 November through 22 November 1998. Second-seeded Julie Halard-Decugis won the singles title and earned $17,700 first-prize money.

== Finals ==
=== Singles ===
(France) Julie Halard-Decugis defeated (China) Fang Li 6–1, 6–2

- It was Halard-Decugis' 3rd title of the year and the 12th of her career.

=== Doubles ===
(Belgium) Els Callens / (France) Julie Halard-Decugis defeated (Japan) Rika Hiraki / (Poland) Aleksandra Olsza 3–6, 6–2, 6–2

- It was Callens' 2nd title of the year and the 3rd of her career. It was Halard-Decugis' 4th title of the year and the 13th of her career.
