= 2001 SEAT Open =

- Date: 22–28 October
- Edition: 6th
- Category: Tier III
- Draw: 30S / 16D
- Prize money: $170,000
- Surface: Hard / indoor
- Location: Kockelscheuer, Luxembourg

Champions

Singles
- (Belgium) Kim Clijsters

Doubles
- (Russia) Elena Bovina / (Slovakia) Daniela Hantuchová
- Luxembourg Open

The 2001 SEAT Open was a women's tennis tournament played on indoor hard courts in Kockelscheuer, Luxembourg which was part of Tier III of the 2001 WTA Tour. It was the 6th edition of the tournament and was held from 22 October until 28 October 2001. First-seeded Kim Clijsters won the singles title, her second at the event after 1999, and earned $27,000 first-prize money.

== Finals ==
=== Singles ===
(Belgium) Kim Clijsters defeated (United States) Lisa Raymond, 6–2, 6–2

- This was Clijsters' 3rd singles title of the year and the 6th of her career.

=== Doubles ===
(Russia) Elena Bovina / (Slovakia) Daniela Hantuchová defeated (Germany) Bianka Lamade / (Switzerland) Patty Schnyder, 6–3, 6–3
