= Lina Krasnoroutskaya =

Russian tennis player

Lina Krasnoroutskaya Лина Красноруцкая
- Full name: Lina Vladimirovna Krasnoroutskaya
- Country (sports): Russia
- Residence: Obninsk, Russia
- Born: 29 April 1984 (age 41) Obninsk, Russian SFSR, Soviet Union
- Height: 1.74 m (5 ft 8 1/2 in)
- Turned pro: 1999
- Retired: 2005
- Plays: Right-handed (two-handed backhand)
- Prize money: $947,916

Singles
- Career record: 131–83
- Career titles: 1 ITF
- Highest ranking: No. 25 (19 January 2004)

Grand Slam singles results
- Australian Open: 3R (2004)
- French Open: QF (2001)
- Wimbledon: 4R (2001)
- US Open: 2R (2001)

Doubles
- Career record: 60–54
- Career titles: 1 WTA
- Highest ranking: No. 22 (2 February 2004)

Grand Slam doubles results
- Australian Open: 2R (2004)
- French Open: 2R (2003)
- Wimbledon: SF (2003)
- US Open: 3R (2001, 2003)

Grand Slam mixed doubles results
- Australian Open: 1R (2004)
- US Open: F (2003)

Team competitions
- Fed Cup: 0–1

Lina Vladimirovna Krasnoroutskaya (Russian: Лина Владимировна Красноруцкая; born 29 April 1984) is a retired tennis player. She is a former junior world No. 1 (1999), and in addition, she won the US Open junior title. Krasnoroutskaya, however, had a career blighted by injury.

== Early life ==
Krasnoroutskaya was born in the Crimean city of Kerch to Vladimir and Marina, the former being also her tennis coach. She also has interest is windsurfing. While growing up, she admired Andre Agassi because of his positive attitude.

== Junior career ==
In January 1998, Krasnorutskaya won Les Petits As, an unofficial world championship for U14 players. She kept dominating the U14 circuit in the Tennis Europe Junior Tour throughout the rest of the year as she successfully defended all three of her 1997 titles; in Geneva, Arezzo, and Moscow; and then reached the final of the European Junior Championships in both singles and doubles, beating Scarlett Werner in the former, while losing the latter paired with Galina Fokina.

In that same year, and despite still being only 14, she began competing in the U16 circuit and won titles in Louvain-la-Neuve, La Hulpe, and Baden-Baden. She ended the 1998 season as the No. 1, thus becoming the first player in the history of the Tennis Europe U14 circuit to successfully defend a year-end No. 1 position (1997 and 1998).

She also had a successful run on the ITF Junior Circuit, where she also dominated, winning the Girls' U.S. Open, ending the year as the No. 1 junior in the world.

== Professional career ==
She turned pro in the following year, in 1999, and in her first WTA Tour tournament in Luxembourg, she reached the semi-finals with a series of remarkable comebacks over Magdalena Maleeva (trailed 6–3, 5–2) and Silvia Farina (trailed 6–0, 3–1). She then won her first and only victory in singles in a senior tournament, an ITF tournament in San Severo, Italy, beating Oana Elena Golimbioschi in the final, 6–3, 6–0. She was ranked No. 163 in her first season-ending ranking.

After a successful year in 2001, when she reached the quarterfinals at Roland Garros (seventh youngest player ever to do so) and the Wimbledon Championships last 16, as the world No. 34, she was badly injured at the 2002 Australian Open when she obtained an invite from Hong Kong Tennis Patrons' Association to play the Hong Kong Ladies Challenge after. She was not effectively back until February 2003 when she climbed back up the rankings (reached 25th) after wins over Monica Seles, Elena Bovina, Nadia Petrova and then-world No. 1, Kim Clijsters.

However, a shoulder injury at the end of 2003, then a liver condition in 2004, followed by stomach problems at the start of 2005 meant that she had considered (March 2005) whether to continue on the pro tour. In June 2005, she announced she would be returning, but that the return would be delayed until after the birth of her first baby in November 2005.

Despite her injuries, she has earned almost $1 million in prize money, has represented her country at both junior and senior level, reached a WTA Tier I final in Canada (2003), a semifinal appearance at Wimbledon in the doubles with Elena Dementieva (having beaten the Williams sisters on centre court in the third round) and runner-up at the US Open in 2003 in the mixed-doubles with Daniel Nestor, who had three match points.

She is a commentator on Russian TV, for NTV Plus.

== Grand Slam finals ==
=== Mixed doubles: 1 runner-up ===
Result	Year	Championship	Surface	Partner	Opponents	Score
Loss	2003	US Open	Hard	(Canada) Daniel Nestor	(Slovenia) Katarina Srebotnik (United States) Bob Bryan	5–7, 7–5, [10–5]

== WTA career finals ==
=== Singles: 1 runner-up ===
Result	Date	Tournament	Tier	Surface	Opponent	Score
Loss	Aug 2003	Canada Masters, Toronto	Tier I	Hard	(Belgium) Justine Henin-Hardenne	1–6, 0–6

=== Doubles: 3 (1–2) ===
Legend Grand Slam (0–0) Tier I (0–1) Tier II (0–0) Tier III, IV & V (1–1)	Finals by surface Hard (0–1) Grass (1–0) Clay (0–0) Carpet (0–1)

Result	No.	Date	Tournament	Surface	Partner	Opponents	Score
Loss	1.	Oct 2001	Kremlin Cup, Russia	Carpet (i)	(Russia) Elena Dementieva	(Russia) Anna Kournikova (Switzerland) Martina Hingis	7–6^{(7–1)}, 6–3
Loss	2.	Nov 2002	Pattaya Open, Thailand	Hard	(Russia) Tatiana Panova	(Republic of Ireland) Kelly Liggan (Czech Republic) Renata Voráčová	5–7, 6–7^{(7–9)}
Win	1.	Jun 2003	Rosmalen Open, Netherlands	Grass	(Russia) Elena Dementieva	(Russia) Nadia Petrova (France) Mary Pierce	2–6, 6–3, 6–4

== ITF finals ==
=== Singles (1–0) ===
Legend
$100,000 tournaments
$75,000 tournaments
$50,000 tournaments
$25,000 tournaments
$10,000 tournaments

Result	No.	Date	Tournament	Surface	Opponent	Score
Win	1.	12 April 1999	ITF San Severo, Italy	Clay	(Romania) Oana Elena Golimbioschi	6–3, 6–0

=== Doubles (0–2) ===
Result	No.	Date	Tournament	Surface	Partner	Opponents	Score
Loss	1.	5 April 1999	ITF Cerignola, Italy	Clay	(Russia) Irina Kornienko	(United Kingdom) Jasmine Choudhury (United Kingdom) Lizzie Jelfs	5–7, 5–7
Loss	2.	3 December 2002	ITF Boynton Beach, United States	Clay	(Russia) Alina Jidkova	(Hungary) Katalin Marosi (United States) Samantha Reeves	2–6, 6–7

== Grand Slam singles performance timeline ==
Key
W	F	SF	QF	#R	RR	Q#	DNQ	A	NH

(W) winner; (F) finalist; (SF) semifinalist; (QF) quarterfinalist; (#R) rounds 4, 3, 2, 1; (RR) round-robin stage; (Q#) qualification round; (DNQ) did not qualify; (A) absent; (NH) not held; (SR) strike rate (events won / competed); (W–L) win–loss record.

Tournament	2000	2001	2002	2003	2004	2005	W-L
Australian Open	1R	1R	1R	Q3	3R	Q3	2–4
French Open	1R	QF	A	2R	A	A	5–3
Wimbledon	1R	4R	A	2R	1R	A	4–4
US Open	1R	2R	A	1R	A	A	1–3
Win–loss	0–4	8–4	0–1	2–3	2–2	N/A	12–14
