= Tatiana Panova =

Russian tennis player

- Country (sports): Russia
- Residence: Moscow
- Born: 13 August 1976 (age 49) Moscow, Soviet Union
- Height: 1.54 m (5 ft 1/2 in)
- Turned pro: 1994
- Retired: 2006
- Plays: Right-handed (two-handed backhand)
- Prize money: $1,561,661

Singles
- Career record: 344–303
- Career titles: 6 ITF
- Highest ranking: No. 20 (23 September 2002)

Grand Slam singles results
- Australian Open: 3R (2003, 2005)
- French Open: 3R (2002)
- Wimbledon: 3R (1999, 2001, 2002, 2004)
- US Open: 3R (2002)

Doubles
- Career record: 40–74
- Career titles: 0
- Highest ranking: No. 75 (27 January 2003)

Grand Slam doubles results
- Australian Open: 1R (2002, 2003, 2004)
- Wimbledon: 1R (2002)
- US Open: 1R (2002)

Tatiana Urayevna Panova (Russian: Татьяна Юрьевна Панова; born 13 August 1976) is a Russian, former top 20 tennis player. On 23 September 2002, she reached her career-high singles ranking, when she peaked at world No. 20, while, on 27 January 2003 she reached her career-high doubles ranking, when she peaked at world No. 75.

== Career ==
2002 was the first year that Panova really jumped into the spotlight, reaching finals in Auckland and Sarasota early in the season. That year she also reached quarterfinals of Miami Open by beating Arantxa Sánchez Vicario in straight sets. She reached the third round of Roland Garros, Wimbledon, and at the US Open, defeating Mirjana Lučić and Anna Kournikova along the way. Martina Navratilova, at age 45, beat her at Eastbourne, in her first singles match in eight years.

Panova was a strong member of the Russian Fed Cup team, going 12–3 throughout her career.

== WTA career finals ==
=== Singles: 3 (3 runner-ups) ===
Legend
Tier I (0–0)
Tier II (0–0)
Tier III (0–0)
Tier IV & V (0–3)

Result	No.	Date	Tournament	Surface	Opponent	Score
Loss	1.	Nov 2000	Pattaya, Thailand	Hard	(Luxembourg) Anne Kremer	1–6, 4–6
Loss	2.	Jan 2002	Auckland, New Zealand	Hard	(Israel) Anna Smashnova	2–6, 2–6
Loss	3.	Apr 2002	Sarasota, United States	Clay	(Federal Republic of Yugoslavia) Jelena Dokic	2–6, 2–6

=== Doubles: 1 (1 runner-up) ===
Legend
Tier I (0–0)
Tier II (0–0)
Tier III (0–0)
Tier IV & V (0–1)

Result	No.	Date	Tournament	Surface	Partner	Opponents	Score
Loss	1.	Nov 2002	Pattaya Open, Thailand	Hard	(Russia) Lina Krasnoroutskaya	(Republic of Ireland) Kelly Liggan (Czech Republic) Renata Voráčová	5–7, 6–7^{(7–9)}

== ITF Circuit finals ==
$100,000 tournaments
$75,000 tournaments
$50,000 tournaments
$25,000 tournaments
$10,000 tournaments

=== Singles: 8 (6–2) ===
Result	No.	Date	Tournament	Surface	Opponent	Score
Win	1.	26 October 1992	ITF Šiauliai, Lithuania	Hard (i)	(Ukraine) Natalia Biletskaya	6–2, 3–6, 6–1
Win	2.	10 January 1994	ITF Mission, United States	Hard	(United States) Ania Bleszynski	6–1, 6–1
Loss	1.	24 January 1994	ITF Austin, United States	Hard	(Federal Republic of Yugoslavia) Tatjana Ječmenica	4–6, 7–6^{(11–9)}, 6–7^{(6–8)}
Win	3.	4 July 1994	ITF Felixstowe, United Kingdom	Gras	(Spain) Magüi Serna	5–7, 6–3, 6–3
Win	4.	18 July 1994	ITF Rheda-Wiedenbrück, Germany	Clay	(Netherlands) Linda Niemantsverdriet	6–0, 6–3
Win	5.	29 August 1994	ITF İstanbul, Turkey	Hard	(Spain) Noelia Pérez Peñate	6–2, 6–2
Loss	2.	13 November 1995	ITF Bad Gögging, Germany	Carpet (i)	(Poland) Magdalena Feistel	6–1, 4–6, 3–6
Win	6.	8 September 1997	ITF Samara, Russia	Carpet (i)	(Czech Republic) Lenka Cenková	6–0, 6–2

=== Doubles: 1 (0–1) ===
Result	No.	Date	Tournament	Surface	Partner	Opponents	Score
Loss	1.	1 December 2003	ITF Palm Beach, United States	Clay	(Russia) Alina Jidkova	(Hungary) Melinda Czink (Argentina) Erica Krauth	1–6, 2–6

== Head-to-head record ==
- Arantxa Sánchez Vicario 1–0
- Lindsay Davenport 0–5
- Martina Hingis 0–5
- Kim Clijsters 0–2
- Justine Henin 0–1
- Venus Williams 0–2
- Serena Williams 0–2
- Daniela Hantuchová 0–2
- Martina Navratilova 0–1
- Jelena Janković 2–0
- Amélie Mauresmo 0–7
- Monica Seles 0–2
- Nadia Petrova 1–1
- Julia Vakulenko 0–1
- Anna Kournikova 1–2
- Janette Husárová 5–0
- Elena Dementieva 3–1
