= 2002 WTA Tour =

Women's tennis circuit

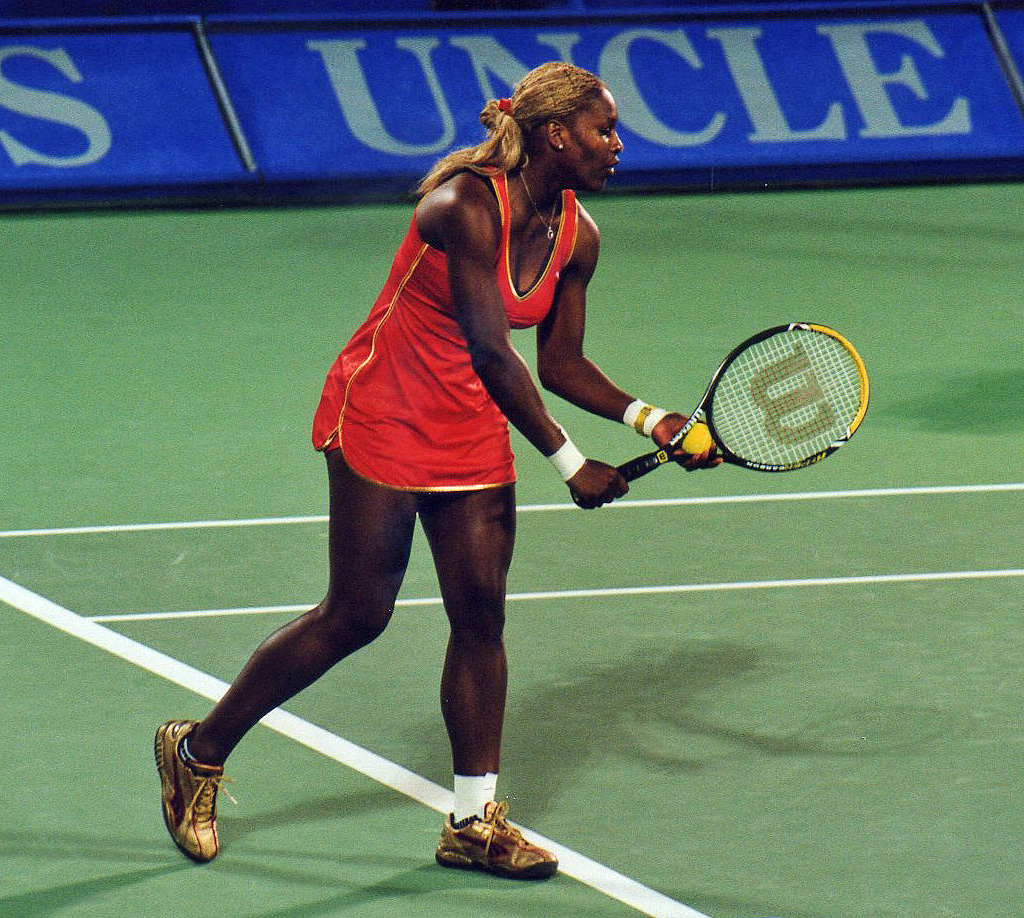
- Serena Williams finished the year as world No. 1 for the first time in her career. She won eight tournaments during the season, including three majors at the French Open, the Wimbledon Championships, and the US Open. She also won two Tier I events.

Details
- Duration: December 29, 2001 – November 11, 2002
- Edition: 32nd
- Tournaments: 64
- Categories: Grand Slam (4); WTA Championships; WTA Tier I (9); WTA Tier II (17); WTA Tier III (17); WTA Tier IV (9); WTA Tier V (7)

Achievements (singles)
- Most titles: (United States) Serena Williams (8)
- Most finals: (United States) Venus Williams (11)
- Prize money leader: (United States) Serena Williams ($3,935,668)
- Points leader: (United States) Serena Williams (6,080)

Awards
- Player of the year: (United States) Serena Williams
- Doubles team of the year: (Spain) Virginia Ruano Pascual (Argentina) Paola Suárez
- Most improved player of the year: (Slovakia) Daniela Hantuchová
- Newcomer of the year: (Russia) Svetlana Kuznetsova
- Comeback player of the year: (United States) Corina Morariu

The 2002 Sanex WTA Tour was the elite professional tennis circuit organized by the Women's Tennis Association (WTA) for the 2002 tennis season. The WTA Tour calendar comprised the Grand Slam tournaments (supervised by the International Tennis Federation (ITF)), the WTA Tier I-V Events, the Fed Cup (organized by the ITF) and the year-end championships.

New tournaments created for the 2002 season included the Proximus Diamond Games in Antwerp, Belgium; a new green clay event, the Sarasota Clay Court Classic, in Sarasota, U.S.; and the Nordea Nordic Light Open held in Espoo, Finland. Another new tournament was created to be held in Aarhus, Denmark, but was later cancelled. Also, the French Community Championships moved cities from Knokke-Heist to Brussels, and the Kroger St. Jude Championship was moved from Oklahoma City, U.S. to a new location in Memphis.

== Season summary ==
Serena Williams was the outright player of the year, ascending to No. 1 for the first time in July and holding it for the rest of that season. She missed the Australian Open due to injury, having won her second, third and fourth Grand Slam singles titles at the French Open, Wimbledon, and the US Open, beating her sister Venus in all three finals. This would lead to her non-calendar Grand Slam (dubbed the "Serena Slam") which she would complete at the Australian Open the following year. Her win–loss record for the year was 56–5. Venus also ascended to the No. 1 ranking in February, and finished the season at No. 2. Jennifer Capriati defended her Australian Open title to win her third Grand Slam title, after the two she won in 2001.

Virginia Ruano Pascual and Paola Suárez were the doubles team of the year, and finished the season as the top 2 on the individual rankings. Their titles at the French Open and the U.S. Open represented their second and third Slam titles together. The Williams sisters won their fifth Grand Slam doubles title together at Wimbledon, and Martina Hingis and Anna Kournikova won their second doubles title together at the Australian Open, with it being Hingis' 9th overall.

Former No. 1 Arantxa Sánchez Vicario announced her retirement at the end of the season, although she returned in 2004 to play doubles tournaments.

== Schedule ==
The table below shows the 2002 WTA Tour schedule.

Key

Grand Slam events
Year-end championships
Tier I events
Tier II events
Tier III events
Tier IV and V events
Team events

=== January ===
Week	Tournament	Champions	Runners-up	Semifinalists	Quarterfinalists
31 Dec	Hopman Cup; Perth, Australia; Hopman Cup; Hard (i) – 8 teams (RR)	Spain; 2–1	United States	Round robin losers (Group A) Australia; Switzerland; Argentina	Round robin losers (Group B) Italy; Belgium; France
31 Dec	Brisbane International; Gold Coast, Australia; Tier III event Hard – $170,000 – 30S/32Q/16D; Singles – Doubles	(United States) Venus Williams; 7–5, 6–2	(Belgium) Justine Henin	(Russia) Nadia Petrova (Czech Republic) Dája Bedáňová	(Japan) Ai Sugiyama (Italy) Silvia Farina Elia (Slovenia) Tina Pisnik (Germany) Anca Barna
31 Dec	Brisbane International; Gold Coast, Australia; Tier III event Hard – $170,000 – 30S/32Q/16D; Singles – Doubles	(Belgium) Justine Henin (United States) Meghann Shaughnessy; 6–1, 7–6^{(8–6)}	(Netherlands) Miriam Oremans (Sweden) Åsa Svensson	(Russia) Nadia Petrova (Czech Republic) Dája Bedáňová	(Japan) Ai Sugiyama (Italy) Silvia Farina Elia (Slovenia) Tina Pisnik (Germany) Anca Barna
31 Dec	ASB Bank Classic; Auckland, New Zealand; Tier IV event Hard – $140,000 – 32S/32Q/16D; Singles – Doubles	(Israel) Anna Smashnova; 6–2, 6–2	(Russia) Tatiana Panova	(Russia) Anna Kournikova (Croatia) Silvija Talaja	(Spain) Anabel Medina Garrigues (Switzerland) Emmanuelle Gagliardi (Luxembourg) Anne Kremer (Belarus) Tatiana Poutchek
31 Dec	ASB Bank Classic; Auckland, New Zealand; Tier IV event Hard – $140,000 – 32S/32Q/16D; Singles – Doubles	(United States) Nicole Arendt (South Africa) Liezel Huber; 7–5, 6–4	(Czech Republic) Květa Hrdličková (Slovakia) Henrieta Nagyová	(Russia) Anna Kournikova (Croatia) Silvija Talaja	(Spain) Anabel Medina Garrigues (Switzerland) Emmanuelle Gagliardi (Luxembourg) Anne Kremer (Belarus) Tatiana Poutchek
7 Jan	Sydney International; Sydney, Australia; Tier II event Hard – $585,000 – 28S/32Q/16D; Singles – Doubles	(Switzerland) Martina Hingis; 6–2, 6–3	(United States) Meghann Shaughnessy	(United States) Serena Williams (Belgium) Kim Clijsters	(United States) Alexandra Stevenson (France) Amélie Mauresmo (Belgium) Justine Henin (France) Sandrine Testud
7 Jan	Sydney International; Sydney, Australia; Tier II event Hard – $585,000 – 28S/32Q/16D; Singles – Doubles	(United States) Lisa Raymond (Australia) Rennae Stubbs; Walkover	(Switzerland) Martina Hingis (Russia) Anna Kournikova	(United States) Serena Williams (Belgium) Kim Clijsters	(United States) Alexandra Stevenson (France) Amélie Mauresmo (Belgium) Justine Henin (France) Sandrine Testud
7 Jan	Tasmanian International; Hobart, Australia; Tier V event Hard – $110,000 – 32S/32Q/16D; Singles – Doubles	(Slovakia) Martina Suchá; 7–6^{(9–7)}, 6–1	(Spain) Anabel Medina Garrigues	(United States) Amy Frazier (Australia) Nicole Pratt	(Italy) Rita Grande (Slovakia) Janette Husárová (United States) Meilen Tu (Russia) Alina Jidkova
7 Jan	Tasmanian International; Hobart, Australia; Tier V event Hard – $110,000 – 32S/32Q/16D; Singles – Doubles	(Italy) Tathiana Garbin (Italy) Rita Grande; 6–2, 7–6^{(7–3)}	(Australia) Catherine Barclay (Australia) Christina Wheeler	(United States) Amy Frazier (Australia) Nicole Pratt	(Italy) Rita Grande (Slovakia) Janette Husárová (United States) Meilen Tu (Russia) Alina Jidkova
7 Jan	Canberra Women's Classic; Canberra, Australia; Tier V event Hard – $110,000 – 32S/32Q/16D; Singles – Doubles	(Israel) Anna Smashnova; 7–5, 7–6^{(7–2)}	(Thailand) Tamarine Tanasugarn	(United States) Lilia Osterloh (Australia) Amanda Grahame	(Switzerland) Patty Schnyder (France) Nathalie Dechy (France) Émilie Loit (Hungary) Petra Mandula
7 Jan	Canberra Women's Classic; Canberra, Australia; Tier V event Hard – $110,000 – 32S/32Q/16D; Singles – Doubles	(South Africa) Nannie de Villiers (Kazakhstan) Irina Selyutina; 6–2, 6–3	(United States) Samantha Reeves (Italy) Adriana Serra Zanetti	(United States) Lilia Osterloh (Australia) Amanda Grahame	(Switzerland) Patty Schnyder (France) Nathalie Dechy (France) Émilie Loit (Hungary) Petra Mandula
14 Jan; 21 Jan	Australian Open; Melbourne, Australia; Grand Slam; Hard – $3,818,613 – 128S/96Q/64D/32X; Singles – Doubles – Mixed doubles	(United States) Jennifer Capriati; 4–6, 7–6^{(9–7)}, 6–2	(Switzerland) Martina Hingis	(Belgium) Kim Clijsters (United States) Monica Seles	(France) Amélie Mauresmo (Belgium) Justine Henin (Italy) Adriana Serra Zanetti (United States) Venus Williams
14 Jan; 21 Jan	Australian Open; Melbourne, Australia; Grand Slam; Hard – $3,818,613 – 128S/96Q/64D/32X; Singles – Doubles – Mixed doubles	(Switzerland) Martina Hingis (Russia) Anna Kournikova; 6–2, 6–7^{(4–7)}, 6–1	(Spain) Arantxa Sánchez Vicario (Slovakia) Daniela Hantuchová	(Belgium) Kim Clijsters (United States) Monica Seles	(France) Amélie Mauresmo (Belgium) Justine Henin (Italy) Adriana Serra Zanetti (United States) Venus Williams
14 Jan; 21 Jan	Australian Open; Melbourne, Australia; Grand Slam; Hard – $3,818,613 – 128S/96Q/64D/32X; Singles – Doubles – Mixed doubles	(Zimbabwe) Kevin Ullyett (Slovakia) Daniela Hantuchová; 6–3, 6–2	(Argentina) Gastón Etlis (Argentina) Paola Suárez	(Belgium) Kim Clijsters (United States) Monica Seles	(France) Amélie Mauresmo (Belgium) Justine Henin (Italy) Adriana Serra Zanetti (United States) Venus Williams
28 Jan	Pan Pacific Open; Tokyo, Japan; Tier I event Carpet (i) – $1,224,000 – 28S/32Q/16D; Singles – Doubles	(Switzerland) Martina Hingis; 7–6^{(8–6)}, 4–6, 6–3	(United States) Monica Seles	(Italy) Silvia Farina Elia (Russia) Anna Kournikova	(Thailand) Tamarine Tanasugarn (France) Sandrine Testud (United States) Alexandra Stevenson (Luxembourg) Anne Kremer
28 Jan	Pan Pacific Open; Tokyo, Japan; Tier I event Carpet (i) – $1,224,000 – 28S/32Q/16D; Singles – Doubles	(United States) Lisa Raymond (Australia) Rennae Stubbs; 6–1, 6–1	(Belgium) Els Callens (Italy) Roberta Vinci	(Italy) Silvia Farina Elia (Russia) Anna Kournikova	(Thailand) Tamarine Tanasugarn (France) Sandrine Testud (United States) Alexandra Stevenson (Luxembourg) Anne Kremer

=== February ===
Week	Tournament	Champions	Runners-up	Semifinalists	Quarterfinalists
4 Feb	Open GDF Suez; Paris, France; Tier II event Hard (i) – $585,000 – 28S/32Q/16D; Singles – Doubles	(United States) Venus Williams; Walkover	(Federal Republic of Yugoslavia) Jelena Dokić	(France) Amélie Mauresmo (United States) Monica Seles	(Italy) Silvia Farina Elia (Italy) Francesca Schiavone (Russia) Elena Dementieva (Belgium) Justine Henin
4 Feb	Open GDF Suez; Paris, France; Tier II event Hard (i) – $585,000 – 28S/32Q/16D; Singles – Doubles	(France) Nathalie Dechy (United States) Meilen Tu; Walkover	(Russia) Elena Dementieva (Slovakia) Janette Husárová	(France) Amélie Mauresmo (United States) Monica Seles	(Italy) Silvia Farina Elia (Italy) Francesca Schiavone (Russia) Elena Dementieva (Belgium) Justine Henin
11 Feb	Diamond Games; Antwerp, Belgium; Tier II event Hard (i) – $585,000 – 28S/32Q/16D; Singles – Doubles	(United States) Venus Williams; 6–3, 5–7, 6–3	(Belgium) Justine Henin	(France) Amélie Mauresmo (Switzerland) Patty Schnyder	(Italy) Silvia Farina Elia (Czech Republic) Dája Bedáňová (Denmark) Eva Dyrberg (Bulgaria) Magdalena Maleeva
11 Feb	Diamond Games; Antwerp, Belgium; Tier II event Hard (i) – $585,000 – 28S/32Q/16D; Singles – Doubles	(Bulgaria) Magdalena Maleeva (Switzerland) Patty Schnyder; 6–3, 6–7^{(3–7)}, 6–3	(France) Nathalie Dechy (United States) Meilen Tu	(France) Amélie Mauresmo (Switzerland) Patty Schnyder	(Italy) Silvia Farina Elia (Czech Republic) Dája Bedáňová (Denmark) Eva Dyrberg (Bulgaria) Magdalena Maleeva
11 Feb	Qatar Open; Doha, Qatar; Tier III event Hard – $170,000 – 30S/32Q/16D; Singles – Doubles	(United States) Monica Seles; 7–6^{(8–6)}, 6–3	(Thailand) Tamarine Tanasugarn	(Australia) Alicia Molik (Slovakia) Janette Husárová	(Australia) Nicole Pratt (Italy) Tathiana Garbin (Slovenia) Maja Matevžič (Russia) Anastasia Myskina
11 Feb	Qatar Open; Doha, Qatar; Tier III event Hard – $170,000 – 30S/32Q/16D; Singles – Doubles	(Slovakia) Janette Husárová (Spain) Arantxa Sánchez Vicario; 6–3, 6–3	(France) Alexandra Fusai (Netherlands) Caroline Vis	(Australia) Alicia Molik (Slovakia) Janette Husárová	(Australia) Nicole Pratt (Italy) Tathiana Garbin (Slovenia) Maja Matevžič (Russia) Anastasia Myskina
18 Feb	Dubai Tennis Championships; Dubai, United Arab Emirates; Tier II event Hard – $585,000 – 28S/32Q/16D; Singles – Doubles	(France) Amélie Mauresmo; 6–4, 7–6^{(7–3)}	(France) Sandrine Testud	(United States) Venus Williams (United States) Monica Seles	(Russia) Anastasia Myskina (Thailand) Tamarine Tanasugarn (Slovenia) Tina Pisnik (Spain) Ángeles Montolio
18 Feb	Dubai Tennis Championships; Dubai, United Arab Emirates; Tier II event Hard – $585,000 – 28S/32Q/16D; Singles – Doubles	(Germany) Barbara Rittner (Venezuela) María Vento-Kabchi; 6–3, 6–2	(France) Sandrine Testud (Italy) Roberta Vinci	(United States) Venus Williams (United States) Monica Seles	(Russia) Anastasia Myskina (Thailand) Tamarine Tanasugarn (Slovenia) Tina Pisnik (Spain) Ángeles Montolio
18 Feb	U.S. National Indoor Tennis Championships; Memphis, United States; Tier III event Hard (i) – $170,000 – 30S/32Q/16D; Singles – Doubles	(United States) Lisa Raymond; 4–6, 6–3, 7–6^{(11–9)}	(United States) Alexandra Stevenson	(Russia) Alina Jidkova (Japan) Ai Sugiyama	(Canada) Jana Nejedly (Croatia) Silvija Talaja (Italy) Adriana Serra Zanetti (United States) Jill Craybas
18 Feb	U.S. National Indoor Tennis Championships; Memphis, United States; Tier III event Hard (i) – $170,000 – 30S/32Q/16D; Singles – Doubles	(Japan) Ai Sugiyama (Ukraine) Elena Tatarkova; 6–4, 2–6, 6–0	(United States) Melissa Middleton (United States) Brie Rippner	(Russia) Alina Jidkova (Japan) Ai Sugiyama	(Canada) Jana Nejedly (Croatia) Silvija Talaja (Italy) Adriana Serra Zanetti (United States) Jill Craybas
18 Feb	Copa Colsanitas; Bogotá, Colombia; Tier III event Clay – $170,000 – 30S/29Q/16D; Singles – Doubles	(Colombia) Fabiola Zuluaga; 6–1, 6–4	(Slovenia) Katarina Srebotnik	(Spain) Cristina Torrens Valero (Colombia) Catalina Castaño	(Paraguay) Rossana de los Ríos (Argentina) Paola Suárez (France) Céline Beigbeder (Argentina) María Emilia Salerni
18 Feb	Copa Colsanitas; Bogotá, Colombia; Tier III event Clay – $170,000 – 30S/29Q/16D; Singles – Doubles	(Spain) Virginia Ruano Pascual (Argentina) Paola Suárez; 6–2, 6–1	(Slovenia) Tina Križan (Slovenia) Katarina Srebotnik	(Spain) Cristina Torrens Valero (Colombia) Catalina Castaño	(Paraguay) Rossana de los Ríos (Argentina) Paola Suárez (France) Céline Beigbeder (Argentina) María Emilia Salerni
25 Feb	State Farm Women's Tennis Classic; Scottsdale, United States; Tier II event Hard – $585,000 – 28S/32Q/16D; Singles – Doubles	(United States) Serena Williams; 6–2, 4–6, 6–4	(United States) Jennifer Capriati	(France) Nathalie Dechy (Switzerland) Martina Hingis	(Austria) Barbara Schett (Italy) Francesca Schiavone (Australia) Nicole Pratt (Czech Republic) Dája Bedáňová
25 Feb	State Farm Women's Tennis Classic; Scottsdale, United States; Tier II event Hard – $585,000 – 28S/32Q/16D; Singles – Doubles	(United States) Lisa Raymond (Australia) Rennae Stubbs; 6–3, 5–7, 7–6^{(7–4)}	(Zimbabwe) Cara Black (Russia) Elena Likhovtseva	(France) Nathalie Dechy (Switzerland) Martina Hingis	(Austria) Barbara Schett (Italy) Francesca Schiavone (Australia) Nicole Pratt (Czech Republic) Dája Bedáňová
25 Feb	Mexican Open; Acapulco, Mexico; Tier III event Clay – $200,000 – 30S/32Q/16D; Singles – Doubles	(Slovenia) Katarina Srebotnik; 6–7^{(1–7)}, 6–4, 6–2	(Argentina) Paola Suárez	(Russia) Elena Dementieva (Russia) Anna Kournikova	(France) Émilie Loit (South Africa) Amanda Coetzer (Spain) Cristina Torrens Valero (Slovakia) Janette Husárová
25 Feb	Mexican Open; Acapulco, Mexico; Tier III event Clay – $200,000 – 30S/32Q/16D; Singles – Doubles	(Spain) Virginia Ruano Pascual (Argentina) Paola Suárez; 7–5, 6–1	(Slovenia) Tina Križan (Slovenia) Katarina Srebotnik	(Russia) Elena Dementieva (Russia) Anna Kournikova	(France) Émilie Loit (South Africa) Amanda Coetzer (Spain) Cristina Torrens Valero (Slovakia) Janette Husárová

=== March ===
Week	Tournament	Champions	Runners-up	Semifinalists	Quarterfinalists
4 Mar; 11 Mar	Pacific Life Open; Indian Wells, United States; Tier I event Hard – $2,100,000 – 96S/48Q/32D; Singles – Doubles	(Slovakia) Daniela Hantuchová; 6–3, 6–4	(Switzerland) Martina Hingis	(Switzerland) Emmanuelle Gagliardi (United States) Monica Seles	(Israel) Anna Smashnova (United States) Lisa Raymond (South Africa) Amanda Coetzer (Spain) Arantxa Sánchez Vicario
4 Mar; 11 Mar	Pacific Life Open; Indian Wells, United States; Tier I event Hard – $2,100,000 – 96S/48Q/32D; Singles – Doubles	(United States) Lisa Raymond (Australia) Rennae Stubbs; 7–5, 6–0	(Russia) Elena Dementieva (Slovakia) Janette Husárová	(Switzerland) Emmanuelle Gagliardi (United States) Monica Seles	(Israel) Anna Smashnova (United States) Lisa Raymond (South Africa) Amanda Coetzer (Spain) Arantxa Sánchez Vicario
18 Mar; 25 Mar	NASDAQ-100 Open; Key Biscayne, United States; Tier I event Hard – $2,860,000 – 96S/48Q/32D; Singles – Doubles	(United States) Serena Williams; 7–5, 7–6^{(7–4)}	(United States) Jennifer Capriati	(United States) Monica Seles (United States) Venus Williams	(Russia) Tatiana Panova (Belgium) Kim Clijsters (Switzerland) Martina Hingis (Russia) Elena Dementieva
18 Mar; 25 Mar	NASDAQ-100 Open; Key Biscayne, United States; Tier I event Hard – $2,860,000 – 96S/48Q/32D; Singles – Doubles	(United States) Lisa Raymond (Australia) Rennae Stubbs; 7–6^{(7–4)}, 6–7^{(4–7)}, 6–3	(Spain) Virginia Ruano Pascual (Argentina) Paola Suárez	(United States) Monica Seles (United States) Venus Williams	(Russia) Tatiana Panova (Belgium) Kim Clijsters (Switzerland) Martina Hingis (Russia) Elena Dementieva

=== April ===
Week	Tournament	Champions	Runners-up	Semifinalists	Quarterfinalists
1 Apr	Porto Open; Porto, Portugal; Tier IV event Clay – $140,000 – 32S/28Q/16D; Singles – Doubles	(Spain) Ángeles Montolio; 6–1, 2–6, 7–5	(Spain) Magüi Serna	(Slovenia) Maja Matevžič (Hungary) Zsófia Gubacsi	(Greece) Eleni Daniilidou (Croatia) Jelena Kostanić (Slovakia) Ľudmila Cervanová (Zimbabwe) Cara Black
1 Apr	Porto Open; Porto, Portugal; Tier IV event Clay – $140,000 – 32S/28Q/16D; Singles – Doubles	(Zimbabwe) Cara Black (Kazakhstan) Irina Selyutina; 7–6^{(8–6)}, 6–4	(Netherlands) Kristie Boogert (Spain) Magüi Serna	(Slovenia) Maja Matevžič (Hungary) Zsófia Gubacsi	(Greece) Eleni Daniilidou (Croatia) Jelena Kostanić (Slovakia) Ľudmila Cervanová (Zimbabwe) Cara Black
1 Apr	Sarasota Clay Court Classic; Sarasota, United States; Tier IV event Clay – $140,000 (green) – 32S/32Q/16D; Singles – Doubles	(Federal Republic of Yugoslavia) Jelena Dokić; 6–2, 6–2	(Russia) Tatiana Panova	(France) Virginie Razzano (United States) Meghann Shaughnessy	(Switzerland) Patty Schnyder (Argentina) Paola Suárez (Slovakia) Janette Husárová (Russia) Anastasia Myskina
1 Apr	Sarasota Clay Court Classic; Sarasota, United States; Tier IV event Clay – $140,000 (green) – 32S/32Q/16D; Singles – Doubles	(Federal Republic of Yugoslavia) Jelena Dokić (Russia) Elena Likhovtseva; 6–7^{(5–7)}, 6–3, 6–3	(Belgium) Els Callens (Spain) Conchita Martínez	(France) Virginie Razzano (United States) Meghann Shaughnessy	(Switzerland) Patty Schnyder (Argentina) Paola Suárez (Slovakia) Janette Husárová (Russia) Anastasia Myskina
8 Apr	Bausch & Lomb Championships; Amelia Island, United States; Tier II event Clay – $585,000 (green) – 56S/32Q/16D; Singles – Doubles	(United States) Venus Williams; 2–6, 7–5, 7–6^{(7–5)}	(Belgium) Justine Henin	(Luxembourg) Anne Kremer (Federal Republic of Yugoslavia) Jelena Dokić	(Argentina) Paola Suárez (France) Sandrine Testud (Russia) Elena Dementieva (Italy) Silvia Farina Elia
8 Apr	Bausch & Lomb Championships; Amelia Island, United States; Tier II event Clay – $585,000 (green) – 56S/32Q/16D; Singles – Doubles	(Slovakia) Daniela Hantuchová (Spain) Arantxa Sánchez Vicario; 6–4, 6–2	(Argentina) María Emilia Salerni (Sweden) Åsa Svensson	(Luxembourg) Anne Kremer (Federal Republic of Yugoslavia) Jelena Dokić	(Argentina) Paola Suárez (France) Sandrine Testud (Russia) Elena Dementieva (Italy) Silvia Farina Elia
8 Apr	Estoril Open; Oeiras, Portugal; Tier IV event Clay – $140,000 – 32S/32Q/16D; Singles – Doubles	(Spain) Magüi Serna; 6–4, 6–2	(Germany) Anca Barna	(Russia) Dinara Safina (Russia) Elena Bovina	(Spain) Ángeles Montolio (Slovenia) Maja Matevžič (Slovenia) Tina Pisnik (Spain) Lourdes Domínguez Lino
8 Apr	Estoril Open; Oeiras, Portugal; Tier IV event Clay – $140,000 – 32S/32Q/16D; Singles – Doubles	(Russia) Elena Bovina (Hungary) Zsófia Gubacsi; 6–3, 6–1	(Germany) Barbara Rittner (Venezuela) María Vento-Kabchi	(Russia) Dinara Safina (Russia) Elena Bovina	(Spain) Ángeles Montolio (Slovenia) Maja Matevžič (Slovenia) Tina Pisnik (Spain) Lourdes Domínguez Lino
15 Apr	Family Circle Cup; Charleston, United States; Tier I event Clay – $1,224,000 (green) – 56S/32Q/28D; Singles – Doubles	(Croatia) Iva Majoli; 7–6^{(7–5)}, 6–4	(Switzerland) Patty Schnyder	(United States) Jennifer Capriati (France) Sandrine Testud	(Russia) Anastasia Myskina (United States) Serena Williams (South Africa) Amanda Coetzer (France) Stéphanie Foretz
15 Apr	Family Circle Cup; Charleston, United States; Tier I event Clay – $1,224,000 (green) – 56S/32Q/28D; Singles – Doubles	(United States) Lisa Raymond (Australia) Rennae Stubbs; 6–4, 3–6, 7–6^{(7–4)}	(France) Alexandra Fusai (Netherlands) Caroline Vis	(United States) Jennifer Capriati (France) Sandrine Testud	(Russia) Anastasia Myskina (United States) Serena Williams (South Africa) Amanda Coetzer (France) Stéphanie Foretz
15 Apr	Budapest Grand Prix; Budapest, Hungary; Tier V event Clay – $110,000 – 32S/32Q/16D; Singles – Doubles	(Germany) Martina Müller; 6–2, 3–6, 6–4	(Switzerland) Myriam Casanova	(Belarus) Tatiana Poutchek (Greece) Eleni Daniilidou	(Slovakia) Martina Suchá (Zimbabwe) Cara Black (Hungary) Rita Kuti-Kis (Bulgaria) Lubomira Bacheva
15 Apr	Budapest Grand Prix; Budapest, Hungary; Tier V event Clay – $110,000 – 32S/32Q/16D; Singles – Doubles	(Australia) Catherine Barclay (France) Émilie Loit; 4–6, 6–3, 6–3	(Russia) Elena Bovina (Hungary) Zsófia Gubacsi	(Belarus) Tatiana Poutchek (Greece) Eleni Daniilidou	(Slovakia) Martina Suchá (Zimbabwe) Cara Black (Hungary) Rita Kuti-Kis (Bulgaria) Lubomira Bacheva
22 Apr	Fed Cup: First Round; Brussels, Belgium, Clay (i); Milan, Italy, Clay; Bratislava, Slovakia, Clay; Buenos Aires, Argentina, Clay; Charlotte, United States, Clay; Bol, Croatia, Clay; Almería, Spain, Clay; Dresden, Germany, Clay	First round winners Belgium 3–1; Italy 5–0; Slovakia 3–2; France 3–2; Austria 3–2; Croatia 3–2; Spain 4–1; Germany 3–2	First round losers Australia; Sweden; Switzerland; Argentina; United States; Czech Republic; Hungary; Russia		
29 Apr	Betty Barclay Cup; Hamburg, Germany; Tier II event Clay – $585,000 – 28S/32Q/16D; Singles – Doubles	(Belgium) Kim Clijsters; 1–6, 6–3, 6–4	(United States) Venus Williams	(Switzerland) Martina Hingis (Federal Republic of Yugoslavia) Jelena Dokić	(Spain) Arantxa Sánchez Vicario (Slovakia) Daniela Hantuchová (Belgium) Justine Henin (Austria) Barbara Schett
29 Apr	Betty Barclay Cup; Hamburg, Germany; Tier II event Clay – $585,000 – 28S/32Q/16D; Singles – Doubles	(Switzerland) Martina Hingis (Austria) Barbara Schett; 6–1, 6–1	(Slovakia) Daniela Hantuchová (Spain) Arantxa Sánchez Vicario	(Switzerland) Martina Hingis (Federal Republic of Yugoslavia) Jelena Dokić	(Spain) Arantxa Sánchez Vicario (Slovakia) Daniela Hantuchová (Belgium) Justine Henin (Austria) Barbara Schett
29 Apr	Croatian Bol Ladies Open; Bol, Croatia; Tier III event Clay – $170,000 – 30S/32Q/16D; Singles – Doubles	(Sweden) Åsa Svensson; 6–3, 4–6, 6–1	(Croatia) Iva Majoli	(Italy) Tathiana Garbin (Czech Republic) Libuše Průšová	(Russia) Elena Dementieva (Slovenia) Tina Pisnik (Russia) Vera Zvonareva (Argentina) Mariana Díaz Oliva
29 Apr	Croatian Bol Ladies Open; Bol, Croatia; Tier III event Clay – $170,000 – 30S/32Q/16D; Singles – Doubles	(Italy) Tathiana Garbin (Indonesia) Angelique Widjaja; 7–5, 3–6, 6–4	(Russia) Elena Bovina (Slovakia) Henrieta Nagyová	(Italy) Tathiana Garbin (Czech Republic) Libuše Průšová	(Russia) Elena Dementieva (Slovenia) Tina Pisnik (Russia) Vera Zvonareva (Argentina) Mariana Díaz Oliva

=== May ===
Week	Tournament	Champions	Runners-up	Semifinalists	Quarterfinalists
6 May	Eurocard German Open; Berlin, Germany; Tier I event Clay – $1,224,000 – 56S/32Q/28D; Singles – Doubles	(Belgium) Justine Henin; 6–2, 1–6, 7–6^{(7–5)}	(United States) Serena Williams	(United States) Jennifer Capriati (Israel) Anna Smashnova	(France) Sandrine Testud (France) Nathalie Dechy (France) Amélie Mauresmo (Slovakia) Daniela Hantuchová
6 May	Eurocard German Open; Berlin, Germany; Tier I event Clay – $1,224,000 – 56S/32Q/28D; Singles – Doubles	(Russia) Elena Dementieva (Slovakia) Janette Husárová; 0–6, 7–6^{(7–3)}, 6–2	(Slovakia) Daniela Hantuchová (Spain) Arantxa Sánchez Vicario	(United States) Jennifer Capriati (Israel) Anna Smashnova	(France) Sandrine Testud (France) Nathalie Dechy (France) Amélie Mauresmo (Slovakia) Daniela Hantuchová
6 May	J&S Cup; Warsaw, Poland; Tier III event Clay – $170,000 – 32S/32Q/16D; Singles – Doubles	(Russia) Elena Bovina; 6–3, 6–1	(Slovakia) Henrieta Nagyová	(Russia) Vera Zvonareva (Croatia) Silvija Talaja	(Spain) Virginia Ruano Pascual (Tunisia) Selima Sfar (Russia) Svetlana Kuznetsova (Slovakia) Ľudmila Cervanová
6 May	J&S Cup; Warsaw, Poland; Tier III event Clay – $170,000 – 32S/32Q/16D; Singles – Doubles	(Croatia) Jelena Kostanić (Slovakia) Henrieta Nagyová; 6–1, 6–1	(Russia) Evgenia Kulikovskaya (Croatia) Silvija Talaja	(Russia) Vera Zvonareva (Croatia) Silvija Talaja	(Spain) Virginia Ruano Pascual (Tunisia) Selima Sfar (Russia) Svetlana Kuznetsova (Slovakia) Ľudmila Cervanová
13 May	Italian Open; Rome, Italy; Tier I event Clay – $1,224,000 – 56S/48Q/28D; Singles – Doubles	(United States) Serena Williams; 7–6^{(8–6)}, 6–4	(Belgium) Justine Henin	(Belgium) Kim Clijsters (United States) Jennifer Capriati	(Spain) Virginia Ruano Pascual (France) Sandrine Testud (Russia) Anastasia Myskina (France) Amélie Mauresmo
13 May	Italian Open; Rome, Italy; Tier I event Clay – $1,224,000 – 56S/48Q/28D; Singles – Doubles	(Spain) Virginia Ruano Pascual (Argentina) Paola Suárez; 6–3, 6–4	(Spain) Conchita Martínez (Argentina) Patricia Tarabini	(Belgium) Kim Clijsters (United States) Jennifer Capriati	(Spain) Virginia Ruano Pascual (France) Sandrine Testud (Russia) Anastasia Myskina (France) Amélie Mauresmo
20 May	Open de España; Madrid, Spain; Tier III event Clay – $170,000 – 30S/32Q/16D; Singles – Doubles	(United States) Monica Seles; 6–4, 6–2	(United States) Chanda Rubin	(Argentina) Paola Suárez (Colombia) Fabiola Zuluaga	(Israel) Anna Smashnova (Argentina) Clarisa Fernández (France) Émilie Loit (Spain) Magüi Serna
20 May	Open de España; Madrid, Spain; Tier III event Clay – $170,000 – 30S/32Q/16D; Singles – Doubles	(United States) Martina Navratilova (Belarus) Natasha Zvereva; 6–2, 6–3	(Paraguay) Rossana de los Ríos (Spain) Arantxa Sánchez Vicario	(Argentina) Paola Suárez (Colombia) Fabiola Zuluaga	(Israel) Anna Smashnova (Argentina) Clarisa Fernández (France) Émilie Loit (Spain) Magüi Serna
20 May	Internationaux de Strasbourg; Strasbourg, France; Tier III event Clay – $170,000 – 30S/32Q/16D; Singles – Doubles	(Italy) Silvia Farina Elia; 6–4, 3–6, 6–3	(Federal Republic of Yugoslavia) Jelena Dokić	(United States) Meghann Shaughnessy (Bulgaria) Magdalena Maleeva	(Croatia) Jelena Kostanić (Switzerland) Emmanuelle Gagliardi (Austria) Barbara Schwartz (United States) Lisa Raymond
20 May	Internationaux de Strasbourg; Strasbourg, France; Tier III event Clay – $170,000 – 30S/32Q/16D; Singles – Doubles	(United States) Jennifer Hopkins (Croatia) Jelena Kostanić; 0–6, 6–4, 6–4	(France) Caroline Dhenin (Slovenia) Maja Matevžič	(United States) Meghann Shaughnessy (Bulgaria) Magdalena Maleeva	(Croatia) Jelena Kostanić (Switzerland) Emmanuelle Gagliardi (Austria) Barbara Schwartz (United States) Lisa Raymond
27 May; 3 Jun	French Open; Paris, France; Grand Slam; Clay – $4,664,160 – 128S/96Q/64D/32X; Singles – Doubles – Mixed doubles	(United States) Serena Williams; 7–5, 6–3	(United States) Venus Williams	(United States) Jennifer Capriati (Argentina) Clarisa Fernández	(Federal Republic of Yugoslavia) Jelena Dokić (France) Mary Pierce (Argentina) Paola Suárez (United States) Monica Seles
27 May; 3 Jun	French Open; Paris, France; Grand Slam; Clay – $4,664,160 – 128S/96Q/64D/32X; Singles – Doubles – Mixed doubles	(Spain) Virginia Ruano Pascual (Argentina) Paola Suárez; 6–4, 6–2	(United States) Lisa Raymond (Australia) Rennae Stubbs	(United States) Jennifer Capriati (Argentina) Clarisa Fernández	(Federal Republic of Yugoslavia) Jelena Dokić (France) Mary Pierce (Argentina) Paola Suárez (United States) Monica Seles
27 May; 3 Jun	French Open; Paris, France; Grand Slam; Clay – $4,664,160 – 128S/96Q/64D/32X; Singles – Doubles – Mixed doubles	(Zimbabwe) Wayne Black (Zimbabwe) Cara Black; 6–3, 6–3	(The Bahamas) Mark Knowles (Russia) Elena Bovina	(United States) Jennifer Capriati (Argentina) Clarisa Fernández	(Federal Republic of Yugoslavia) Jelena Dokić (France) Mary Pierce (Argentina) Paola Suárez (United States) Monica Seles

=== June ===
Week	Tournament	Champions	Runners-up	Semifinalists	Quarterfinalists
10 Jun	DFS Classic; Birmingham, Great Britain; Tier III event Grass – $170,000 – 56S/32Q/16D; Singles – Doubles	(Federal Republic of Yugoslavia) Jelena Dokić; 6–2, 6–3	(Russia) Anastasia Myskina	(United States) Lisa Raymond (Australia) Nicole Pratt	(Greece) Eleni Daniilidou (Argentina) Clarisa Fernández (Bulgaria) Magdalena Maleeva (Luxembourg) Anne Kremer
10 Jun	DFS Classic; Birmingham, Great Britain; Tier III event Grass – $170,000 – 56S/32Q/16D; Singles – Doubles	(Japan) Shinobu Asagoe (Belgium) Els Callens; 6–4, 6–3	(United States) Kimberly Po-Messerli (France) Nathalie Tauziat	(United States) Lisa Raymond (Australia) Nicole Pratt	(Greece) Eleni Daniilidou (Argentina) Clarisa Fernández (Bulgaria) Magdalena Maleeva (Luxembourg) Anne Kremer
10 Jun	Wien Energie Grand Prix; Vienna, Austria; Tier III event Clay – $170,000 – 30S/32Q/16D; Singles – Doubles	(Israel) Anna Smashnova; 6–4, 6–1	(Uzbekistan) Iroda Tulyaganova	(Austria) Patricia Wartusch (Hungary) Petra Mandula	(Spain) Cristina Torrens Valero (Switzerland) Patty Schnyder (Austria) Barbara Schett (Croatia) Iva Majoli
10 Jun	Wien Energie Grand Prix; Vienna, Austria; Tier III event Clay – $170,000 – 30S/32Q/16D; Singles – Doubles	(Hungary) Petra Mandula (Austria) Patricia Wartusch; 6–2, 6–4	(Austria) Barbara Schwartz (Germany) Jasmin Wöhr	(Austria) Patricia Wartusch (Hungary) Petra Mandula	(Spain) Cristina Torrens Valero (Switzerland) Patty Schnyder (Austria) Barbara Schett (Croatia) Iva Majoli
10 Jun	Tashkent Open; Tashkent, Uzbekistan; Tier IV event Hard – $140,000 – 32S/32Q/16D; Singles – Doubles	(Switzerland) Marie-Gayanay Mikaelian; 6–4, 6–4	(Belarus) Tatiana Poutchek	(Italy) Tathiana Garbin (Italy) Roberta Vinci	(Belarus) Nadejda Ostrovskaya (Italy) Maria Elena Camerin (Ukraine) Tatiana Perebiynis (Russia) Lioudmila Skavronskaia
10 Jun	Tashkent Open; Tashkent, Uzbekistan; Tier IV event Hard – $140,000 – 32S/32Q/16D; Singles – Doubles	(Ukraine) Tatiana Perebiynis (Belarus) Tatiana Poutchek; 7–5, 6–2	(Germany) Mia Buric (Russia) Galina Fokina	(Italy) Tathiana Garbin (Italy) Roberta Vinci	(Belarus) Nadejda Ostrovskaya (Italy) Maria Elena Camerin (Ukraine) Tatiana Perebiynis (Russia) Lioudmila Skavronskaia
17 Jun	Britannic Asset Management Champ's; Eastbourne, Great Britain; Tier II event Grass – $585,000 – 28S/32Q/16D; Singles – Doubles	(United States) Chanda Rubin; 6–1, 6–3	(Russia) Anastasia Myskina	(Czech Republic) Dája Bedáňová (Slovakia) Daniela Hantuchová	(United States) Meghann Shaughnessy (Italy) Silvia Farina Elia (United States) Amy Frazier (Luxembourg) Anne Kremer
17 Jun	Britannic Asset Management Champ's; Eastbourne, Great Britain; Tier II event Grass – $585,000 – 28S/32Q/16D; Singles – Doubles	(United States) Lisa Raymond (Australia) Rennae Stubbs; 6–7^{(5–7)}, 7–6^{(8–6)}, 6–2	(Zimbabwe) Cara Black (Russia) Elena Likhovtseva	(Czech Republic) Dája Bedáňová (Slovakia) Daniela Hantuchová	(United States) Meghann Shaughnessy (Italy) Silvia Farina Elia (United States) Amy Frazier (Luxembourg) Anne Kremer
17 Jun	Ordina Open 's-Hertogenbosch, Netherlands; Tier III event Grass – $170,000 – 30S/16D; Singles – Doubles	(Greece) Eleni Daniilidou; 3–6, 6–2, 6–3	(Russia) Elena Dementieva	(Slovenia) Tina Pisnik (Belgium) Justine Henin	(Belgium) Kim Clijsters (Bulgaria) Magdalena Maleeva (France) Amélie Mauresmo (Russia) Elena Bovina
17 Jun	Ordina Open 's-Hertogenbosch, Netherlands; Tier III event Grass – $170,000 – 30S/16D; Singles – Doubles	(Australia) Catherine Barclay (Germany) Martina Müller; 6–4, 7–5	(Germany) Bianka Lamade (Bulgaria) Magdalena Maleeva	(Slovenia) Tina Pisnik (Belgium) Justine Henin	(Belgium) Kim Clijsters (Bulgaria) Magdalena Maleeva (France) Amélie Mauresmo (Russia) Elena Bovina
24 Jun; 1 Jul	Wimbledon Championships; London, Great Britain; Grand Slam; Grass – $4,448,330 – 128S/96Q/64D/32X; Singles – Doubles – Mixed doubles	(United States) Serena Williams; 7–6^{(7–4)}, 6–3	(United States) Venus Williams	(Belgium) Justine Henin (France) Amélie Mauresmo	(Russia) Elena Likhovtseva (United States) Monica Seles (United States) Jennifer Capriati (Slovakia) Daniela Hantuchová
24 Jun; 1 Jul	Wimbledon Championships; London, Great Britain; Grand Slam; Grass – $4,448,330 – 128S/96Q/64D/32X; Singles – Doubles – Mixed doubles	(United States) Serena Williams (United States) Venus Williams; 6–2, 7–5	(Spain) Virginia Ruano Pascual (Argentina) Paola Suárez	(Belgium) Justine Henin (France) Amélie Mauresmo	(Russia) Elena Likhovtseva (United States) Monica Seles (United States) Jennifer Capriati (Slovakia) Daniela Hantuchová
24 Jun; 1 Jul	Wimbledon Championships; London, Great Britain; Grand Slam; Grass – $4,448,330 – 128S/96Q/64D/32X; Singles – Doubles – Mixed doubles	(India) Mahesh Bhupathi (Russia) Elena Likhovtseva; 6–2, 1–6, 6–1	(Zimbabwe) Kevin Ullyett (Slovakia) Daniela Hantuchová	(Belgium) Justine Henin (France) Amélie Mauresmo	(Russia) Elena Likhovtseva (United States) Monica Seles (United States) Jennifer Capriati (Slovakia) Daniela Hantuchová

=== July ===
Week	Tournament	Champions	Runners-up	Semifinalists	Quarterfinalists
8 Jul	French Community Championships; Brussels, Belgium; Tier IV event Clay – $140,000 – 32S/29Q/16D; Singles – Doubles	(Switzerland) Myriam Casanova; 4–6, 6–2, 6–1	(Spain) Arantxa Sánchez Vicario	(France) Émilie Loit (Spain) Virginia Ruano Pascual	(Spain) Magüi Serna (Austria) Barbara Schwartz (Germany) Martina Müller (Austria) Barbara Schett
8 Jul	French Community Championships; Brussels, Belgium; Tier IV event Clay – $140,000 – 32S/29Q/16D; Singles – Doubles	(Austria) Barbara Schwartz (Germany) Jasmin Wöhr; 6–2, 0–6, 6–4	(Italy) Tathiana Garbin (Spain) Arantxa Sánchez Vicario	(France) Émilie Loit (Spain) Virginia Ruano Pascual	(Spain) Magüi Serna (Austria) Barbara Schwartz (Germany) Martina Müller (Austria) Barbara Schett
8 Jul	GP SAR La Princesse Lalla Meryem; Casablanca, Morocco; Tier V event Clay – $110,000 – 32S/32Q/16D; Singles – Doubles	(Austria) Patricia Wartusch; 5–7, 6–3, 6–3	(Czech Republic) Klára Koukalová	(Russia) Svetlana Kuznetsova (Argentina) Gisela Dulko	(Italy) Maria Elena Camerin (Slovakia) Ľudmila Cervanová (Hungary) Petra Mandula (Hungary) Zsófia Gubacsi
8 Jul	GP SAR La Princesse Lalla Meryem; Casablanca, Morocco; Tier V event Clay – $110,000 – 32S/32Q/16D; Singles – Doubles	(Hungary) Petra Mandula (Austria) Patricia Wartusch; 6–2, 6–1	(Argentina) Gisela Dulko (Spain) Conchita Martínez Granados	(Russia) Svetlana Kuznetsova (Argentina) Gisela Dulko	(Italy) Maria Elena Camerin (Slovakia) Ľudmila Cervanová (Hungary) Petra Mandula (Hungary) Zsófia Gubacsi
8 Jul	Internazionali Femminili di Palermo; Palermo, Italy; Tier V event Clay – $110,000 – 32S/27Q/16D; Singles – Doubles	(Argentina) Mariana Díaz Oliva; 6–7^{(6–8)}, 6–1, 6–3	(Russia) Vera Zvonareva	(Argentina) Paola Suárez (Slovakia) Henrieta Nagyová	(France) Céline Beigbeder (Russia) Ekaterina Sysoeva (Bulgaria) Lubomira Bacheva (Belarus) Nadejda Ostrovskaya
8 Jul	Internazionali Femminili di Palermo; Palermo, Italy; Tier V event Clay – $110,000 – 32S/27Q/16D; Singles – Doubles	(Russia) Evgenia Kulikovskaya (Russia) Ekaterina Sysoeva; 6–4, 6–3	(Bulgaria) Lubomira Bacheva (Germany) Angelika Rösch	(Argentina) Paola Suárez (Slovakia) Henrieta Nagyová	(France) Céline Beigbeder (Russia) Ekaterina Sysoeva (Bulgaria) Lubomira Bacheva (Belarus) Nadejda Ostrovskaya
15 Jul	Fed Cup: Quarterfinal; Bologna, Italy, Clay; Bratislava, Slovakia, Carpet (i); Pörtschach, Austria, Clay; Capdepera, Spain, Clay	Quarterfinal winners Italy 4–1; Slovakia 4–1; Austria 4–1; Spain 5–0	Quarterfinal losers Belgium; France; Croatia; Germany		
22 Jul	Bank of the West Classic; Stanford, United States; Tier II event Hard – $585,000 – 28S/32Q/16D; Singles – Doubles	(United States) Venus Williams; 6–3, 6–3	(Belgium) Kim Clijsters	(United States) Lisa Raymond (United States) Lindsay Davenport	(Russia) Anna Kournikova (United States) Monica Seles (Serbia and Montenegro) Jelena Janković (Federal Republic of Yugoslavia) Jelena Dokić
22 Jul	Bank of the West Classic; Stanford, United States; Tier II event Hard – $585,000 – 28S/32Q/16D; Singles – Doubles	(United States) Lisa Raymond (Australia) Rennae Stubbs; 6–1, 6–1	(Slovakia) Janette Husárová (Spain) Conchita Martínez	(United States) Lisa Raymond (United States) Lindsay Davenport	(Russia) Anna Kournikova (United States) Monica Seles (Serbia and Montenegro) Jelena Janković (Federal Republic of Yugoslavia) Jelena Dokić
22 Jul	Idea Prokom Open; Sopot, Poland; Tier III event Clay – $300,000 – 30S/32Q/16D; Singles – Doubles	(Russia) Dinara Safina; 6–3, 4–0 retired	(Slovakia) Henrieta Nagyová	(Italy) Tathiana Garbin (Russia) Vera Zvonareva	(Germany) Barbara Rittner (Spain) Arantxa Sánchez Vicario (Spain) Virginia Ruano Pascual (Spain) Magüi Serna
22 Jul	Idea Prokom Open; Sopot, Poland; Tier III event Clay – $300,000 – 30S/32Q/16D; Singles – Doubles	(Russia) Svetlana Kuznetsova (Spain) Arantxa Sánchez Vicario; 6–2, 6–2	(Russia) Evgenia Kulikovskaya (Russia) Ekaterina Sysoeva	(Italy) Tathiana Garbin (Russia) Vera Zvonareva	(Germany) Barbara Rittner (Spain) Arantxa Sánchez Vicario (Spain) Virginia Ruano Pascual (Spain) Magüi Serna
29 Jul	Acura Classic; San Diego, United States; Tier II event Hard – $775,000 – 56S/16Q/16D; Singles – Doubles	(United States) Venus Williams; 6–2, 6–2	(Federal Republic of Yugoslavia) Jelena Dokić	(United States) Lindsay Davenport (Russia) Anna Kournikova	(Belgium) Kim Clijsters (Japan) Ai Sugiyama (Israel) Anna Smashnova (United States) Jennifer Capriati
29 Jul	Acura Classic; San Diego, United States; Tier II event Hard – $775,000 – 56S/16Q/16D; Singles – Doubles	(Russia) Elena Dementieva (Slovakia) Janette Husárová; 6–2, 6–4	(Slovakia) Daniela Hantuchová (Japan) Ai Sugiyama	(United States) Lindsay Davenport (Russia) Anna Kournikova	(Belgium) Kim Clijsters (Japan) Ai Sugiyama (Israel) Anna Smashnova (United States) Jennifer Capriati

=== August ===
Week	Tournament	Champions	Runners-up	Semifinalists	Quarterfinalists
5 Aug	JPMorgan Chase Open; Manhattan Beach, United States; Tier II event Hard – $585,000 – 56S/16Q/16D; Singles – Doubles	(United States) Chanda Rubin; 5–7, 7–6^{(7–5)}, 6–3	(United States) Lindsay Davenport	(Federal Republic of Yugoslavia) Jelena Dokić (Japan) Ai Sugiyama	(United States) Serena Williams (Italy) Rita Grande (Greece) Eleni Daniilidou (United States) Jennifer Capriati
5 Aug	JPMorgan Chase Open; Manhattan Beach, United States; Tier II event Hard – $585,000 – 56S/16Q/16D; Singles – Doubles	(Belgium) Kim Clijsters (Federal Republic of Yugoslavia) Jelena Dokić; 6–3, 6–3	(Slovakia) Daniela Hantuchová (Japan) Ai Sugiyama	(Federal Republic of Yugoslavia) Jelena Dokić (Japan) Ai Sugiyama	(United States) Serena Williams (Italy) Rita Grande (Greece) Eleni Daniilidou (United States) Jennifer Capriati
5 Aug	Nordea Nordic Light Open; Espoo, Finland; Tier IV event Clay – $140,000 – 32S/32Q/16D; Singles – Doubles	(Russia) Svetlana Kuznetsova; 0–6, 6–3, 7–6^{(7–2)}	(Czech Republic) Denisa Chládková	(Austria) Patricia Wartusch (Slovakia) Martina Suchá	(Sweden) Åsa Svensson (Hungary) Petra Mandula (Switzerland) Patty Schnyder (Spain) Gala León García
5 Aug	Nordea Nordic Light Open; Espoo, Finland; Tier IV event Clay – $140,000 – 32S/32Q/16D; Singles – Doubles	(Russia) Svetlana Kuznetsova (Spain) Arantxa Sánchez Vicario; 6–3, 6–7^{(5–7)}, 6–3	(Spain) Eva Bes-Ostariz (Spain) María José Martínez Sánchez	(Austria) Patricia Wartusch (Slovakia) Martina Suchá	(Sweden) Åsa Svensson (Hungary) Petra Mandula (Switzerland) Patty Schnyder (Spain) Gala León García
12 Aug	Rogers AT&T Cup; Montreal, Canada; Tier I event Hard – $1,224,000 – 56S/32Q/28D; Singles – Doubles	(France) Amélie Mauresmo; 6–4, 6–1	(United States) Jennifer Capriati	(Slovakia) Daniela Hantuchová (Federal Republic of Yugoslavia) Jelena Dokić	(Colombia) Fabiola Zuluaga (Austria) Barbara Schett (Switzerland) Martina Hingis (Belgium) Justine Henin
12 Aug	Rogers AT&T Cup; Montreal, Canada; Tier I event Hard – $1,224,000 – 56S/32Q/28D; Singles – Doubles	(Spain) Virginia Ruano Pascual (Argentina) Paola Suárez; 6–4, 7–6^{(7–4)}	(Japan) Rika Fujiwara (Japan) Ai Sugiyama	(Slovakia) Daniela Hantuchová (Federal Republic of Yugoslavia) Jelena Dokić	(Colombia) Fabiola Zuluaga (Austria) Barbara Schett (Switzerland) Martina Hingis (Belgium) Justine Henin
19 Aug	Pilot Pen Tennis; New Haven, United States; Tier II event Hard – $585,000 – 28S/32Q/16D; Singles – Doubles	(United States) Venus Williams; 7–5, 6–0	(United States) Lindsay Davenport	(Slovakia) Daniela Hantuchová (Russia) Anastasia Myskina	(United States) Laura Granville (Switzerland) Patty Schnyder (Switzerland) Martina Hingis (France) Amélie Mauresmo
19 Aug	Pilot Pen Tennis; New Haven, United States; Tier II event Hard – $585,000 – 28S/32Q/16D; Singles – Doubles	(Slovakia) Daniela Hantuchová (Spain) Arantxa Sánchez Vicario; 6–3, 1–6, 7–5	(Italy) Tathiana Garbin (Slovakia) Janette Husárová	(Slovakia) Daniela Hantuchová (Russia) Anastasia Myskina	(United States) Laura Granville (Switzerland) Patty Schnyder (Switzerland) Martina Hingis (France) Amélie Mauresmo
26 Aug; 2 Sep	U.S. Open; New York City, United States; Grand Slam; Hard – $6,261,690 – 128S/128Q/64D/32X; Singles – Doubles – Mixed doubles	(United States) Serena Williams; 6–4, 6–3	(United States) Venus Williams	(United States) Lindsay Davenport (France) Amélie Mauresmo	(Slovakia) Daniela Hantuchová (Russia) Elena Bovina (United States) Jennifer Capriati (United States) Monica Seles
26 Aug; 2 Sep	U.S. Open; New York City, United States; Grand Slam; Hard – $6,261,690 – 128S/128Q/64D/32X; Singles – Doubles – Mixed doubles	(Spain) Virginia Ruano Pascual (Argentina) Paola Suárez; 6–2, 6–1	(Russia) Elena Dementieva (Slovakia) Janette Husárová	(United States) Lindsay Davenport (France) Amélie Mauresmo	(Slovakia) Daniela Hantuchová (Russia) Elena Bovina (United States) Jennifer Capriati (United States) Monica Seles
26 Aug; 2 Sep	U.S. Open; New York City, United States; Grand Slam; Hard – $6,261,690 – 128S/128Q/64D/32X; Singles – Doubles – Mixed doubles	(United States) Mike Bryan (United States) Lisa Raymond; 7–6^{(11–9)}, 7–6^{(7–1)}	(United States) Bob Bryan (Slovenia) Katarina Srebotnik	(United States) Lindsay Davenport (France) Amélie Mauresmo	(Slovakia) Daniela Hantuchová (Russia) Elena Bovina (United States) Jennifer Capriati (United States) Monica Seles

=== September ===
Week	Tournament	Champions	Runners-up	Semifinalists	Quarterfinalists
9 Sep	Brasil Open; Bahia, Brasil; Tier II event Hard – $650,000 – 28S/32Q/16D; Singles – Doubles	(Russia) Anastasia Myskina; 6–3, 0–6, 6–2	(Greece) Eleni Daniilidou	(Federal Republic of Yugoslavia) Jelena Dokić (United States) Monica Seles	(South Africa) Amanda Coetzer (Slovenia) Maja Matevžič (Switzerland) Patty Schnyder (Slovakia) Henrieta Nagyová
9 Sep	Brasil Open; Bahia, Brasil; Tier II event Hard – $650,000 – 28S/32Q/16D; Singles – Doubles	(Spain) Virginia Ruano Pascual (Argentina) Paola Suárez; 6–4, 6–1	(France) Émilie Loit (Paraguay) Rossana de los Ríos	(Federal Republic of Yugoslavia) Jelena Dokić (United States) Monica Seles	(South Africa) Amanda Coetzer (Slovenia) Maja Matevžič (Switzerland) Patty Schnyder (Slovakia) Henrieta Nagyová
9 Sep	SVW Polo Open; Shanghai, China; Tier IV event Hard – $140,000 – 32S/32Q/16D; Singles – Doubles	(Israel) Anna Smashnova; 6–2, 6–3	(Russia) Anna Kournikova	(Indonesia) Angelique Widjaja (Japan) Ai Sugiyama	(Japan) Miho Saeki (Argentina) Clarisa Fernández (Croatia) Jelena Kostanić (Italy) Adriana Serra Zanetti
9 Sep	SVW Polo Open; Shanghai, China; Tier IV event Hard – $140,000 – 32S/32Q/16D; Singles – Doubles	(Russia) Anna Kournikova (Chinese Taipei) Janet Lee; 7–5, 6–3	(Japan) Rika Fujiwara (Japan) Ai Sugiyama	(Indonesia) Angelique Widjaja (Japan) Ai Sugiyama	(Japan) Miho Saeki (Argentina) Clarisa Fernández (Croatia) Jelena Kostanić (Italy) Adriana Serra Zanetti
9 Sep	Big Island Championships; Waikoloa, United States; Tier IV event Hard – $140,000 – 32S/22Q/16D; Singles – Doubles	(Zimbabwe) Cara Black; 7–6^{(7–1)}, 6–4	(United States) Lisa Raymond	(Spain) Gala León García (Belgium) Els Callens	(United States) Jill Craybas (Russia) Elena Likhovtseva (United States) Samantha Reeves (Spain) Conchita Martínez
9 Sep	Big Island Championships; Waikoloa, United States; Tier IV event Hard – $140,000 – 32S/22Q/16D; Singles – Doubles	(United States) Meilen Tu (Venezuela) María Vento-Kabchi; 1–6, 6–2, 6–3	(South Africa) Nannie de Villiers (Kazakhstan) Irina Selyutina	(Spain) Gala León García (Belgium) Els Callens	(United States) Jill Craybas (Russia) Elena Likhovtseva (United States) Samantha Reeves (Spain) Conchita Martínez
16 Sep	Toyota Princess Cup; Tokyo, Japan; Tier II event Hard – $585,000 – 28S/32Q/16D; Singles – Doubles	(United States) Serena Williams; 2–6, 6–3, 6–3	(Belgium) Kim Clijsters	(United States) Amy Frazier (Federal Republic of Yugoslavia) Jelena Dokić	(Australia) Nicole Pratt (Russia) Tatiana Panova (Russia) Elena Likhovtseva (Thailand) Tamarine Tanasugarn
16 Sep	Toyota Princess Cup; Tokyo, Japan; Tier II event Hard – $585,000 – 28S/32Q/16D; Singles – Doubles	(Russia) Svetlana Kuznetsova (Spain) Arantxa Sánchez Vicario; 6–2, 6–4	(Hungary) Petra Mandula (Austria) Patricia Wartusch	(United States) Amy Frazier (Federal Republic of Yugoslavia) Jelena Dokić	(Australia) Nicole Pratt (Russia) Tatiana Panova (Russia) Elena Likhovtseva (Thailand) Tamarine Tanasugarn
16 Sep	Bell Challenge; Quebec City, Canada; Tier III event Carpet (i) – $170,000 – 30S/32Q/16D; Singles – Doubles	(Russia) Elena Bovina; 6–3, 6–4	(Switzerland) Marie-Gayanay Mikaelian	(Italy) Silvia Farina Elia (Russia) Anastasia Rodionova	(United States) Alexandra Stevenson (Bulgaria) Magdalena Maleeva (Germany) Marlene Weingärtner (Germany) Angelika Rösch
16 Sep	Bell Challenge; Quebec City, Canada; Tier III event Carpet (i) – $170,000 – 30S/32Q/16D; Singles – Doubles	(United States) Samantha Reeves (South Africa) Jessica Steck; 4–6, 6–3, 7–5	(Argentina) María Emilia Salerni (Colombia) Fabiola Zuluaga	(Italy) Silvia Farina Elia (Russia) Anastasia Rodionova	(United States) Alexandra Stevenson (Bulgaria) Magdalena Maleeva (Germany) Marlene Weingärtner (Germany) Angelika Rösch
23 Sep	Sparkassen Cup; Leipzig, Germany; Tier II event Hard (i) – $585,000 – 28S/32Q/16D; Singles – Doubles	(United States) Serena Williams; 6–3, 6–2	(Russia) Anastasia Myskina	(Belgium) Justine Henin (Belgium) Kim Clijsters	(Slovakia) Janette Husárová (Slovakia) Daniela Hantuchová (Germany) Barbara Rittner (United States) Meghann Shaughnessy
23 Sep	Sparkassen Cup; Leipzig, Germany; Tier II event Hard (i) – $585,000 – 28S/32Q/16D; Singles – Doubles	(United States) Alexandra Stevenson (United States) Serena Williams; 6–3, 7–5	(Slovakia) Janette Husárová (Argentina) Paola Suárez	(Belgium) Justine Henin (Belgium) Kim Clijsters	(Slovakia) Janette Husárová (Slovakia) Daniela Hantuchová (Germany) Barbara Rittner (United States) Meghann Shaughnessy
23 Sep	Wismilak International; Bali, Indonesia; Tier III event Hard – $225,000 – 30S/32Q/16D; Singles – Doubles	(Russia) Svetlana Kuznetsova; 3–6, 7–6^{(7–4)}, 7–5	(Spain) Conchita Martínez	(United States) Sarah Taylor (Spain) Arantxa Sánchez Vicario	(Paraguay) Rossana de los Ríos (Spain) Marta Marrero (Russia) Lina Krasnoroutskaya (Japan) Saori Obata
23 Sep	Wismilak International; Bali, Indonesia; Tier III event Hard – $225,000 – 30S/32Q/16D; Singles – Doubles	(Zimbabwe) Cara Black (Spain) Virginia Ruano Pascual; 6–2, 6–3	(Russia) Svetlana Kuznetsova (Spain) Arantxa Sánchez Vicario	(United States) Sarah Taylor (Spain) Arantxa Sánchez Vicario	(Paraguay) Rossana de los Ríos (Spain) Marta Marrero (Russia) Lina Krasnoroutskaya (Japan) Saori Obata
30 Sep	Kremlin Cup; Moscow, Russia; Tier I event Carpet (i) – $1,224,000 – 28S/32Q/16D; Singles – Doubles	(Bulgaria) Magdalena Maleeva; 5–7, 6–3, 7–6^{(7–4)}	(United States) Lindsay Davenport	(France) Amélie Mauresmo (South Africa) Amanda Coetzer	(France) Nathalie Dechy (Slovenia) Maja Matevžič (Russia) Nadia Petrova (Russia) Elena Bovina
30 Sep	Kremlin Cup; Moscow, Russia; Tier I event Carpet (i) – $1,224,000 – 28S/32Q/16D; Singles – Doubles	(Russia) Elena Dementieva (Slovakia) Janette Husárová; 2–6, 6–3, 7–6^{(9–7)}	(Federal Republic of Yugoslavia) Jelena Dokić (Russia) Nadia Petrova	(France) Amélie Mauresmo (South Africa) Amanda Coetzer	(France) Nathalie Dechy (Slovenia) Maja Matevžič (Russia) Nadia Petrova (Russia) Elena Bovina
30 Sep	AIG Japan Open; Tokyo, Japan; Tier III event Hard – $170,000 – 30S/32Q/16D; Singles – Doubles	(United States) Jill Craybas; 2–6, 6–4, 6–4	(Croatia) Silvija Talaja	(United States) Sarah Taylor (Thailand) Tamarine Tanasugarn	(Japan) Ai Sugiyama (Japan) Yuka Yoshida (Croatia) Jelena Kostanić (Australia) Alicia Molik
30 Sep	AIG Japan Open; Tokyo, Japan; Tier III event Hard – $170,000 – 30S/32Q/16D; Singles – Doubles	(Japan) Shinobu Asagoe (Japan) Nana Miyagi; 6–4, 4–6, 6–4	(Russia) Svetlana Kuznetsova (Spain) Arantxa Sánchez Vicario	(United States) Sarah Taylor (Thailand) Tamarine Tanasugarn	(Japan) Ai Sugiyama (Japan) Yuka Yoshida (Croatia) Jelena Kostanić (Australia) Alicia Molik

=== October ===
Week	Tournament	Champions	Runners-up	Semifinalists	Quarterfinalists
7 Oct	Porsche Tennis Grand Prix; Filderstadt, Germany; Tier II event Hard (i) – $625,000 – 28S/32Q/16D; Singles – Doubles	(Belgium) Kim Clijsters; 4–6, 6–3, 6–4	(Slovakia) Daniela Hantuchová	(Russia) Elena Dementieva (France) Amélie Mauresmo	(United States) Alexandra Stevenson (Switzerland) Myriam Casanova (Russia) Tatiana Panova (United States) Lindsay Davenport
7 Oct	Porsche Tennis Grand Prix; Filderstadt, Germany; Tier II event Hard (i) – $625,000 – 28S/32Q/16D; Singles – Doubles	(United States) Lindsay Davenport (United States) Lisa Raymond; 6–2, 6–4	(United States) Meghann Shaughnessy (Argentina) Paola Suárez	(Russia) Elena Dementieva (France) Amélie Mauresmo	(United States) Alexandra Stevenson (Switzerland) Myriam Casanova (Russia) Tatiana Panova (United States) Lindsay Davenport
14 Oct	Swisscom Challenge; Zürich, Switzerland; Tier I event Hard (i) – $1,224,000 – 28S/32Q/16D; Singles – Doubles	(Switzerland) Patty Schnyder; 6–7^{(5–7)}, 7–6^{(10–8)}, 6–3	(United States) Lindsay Davenport	(Spain) Conchita Martínez (Belgium) Justine Henin	(United States) Alexandra Stevenson (Slovakia) Daniela Hantuchová (Switzerland) Marie-Gaïané Mikaelian (Belgium) Kim Clijsters
14 Oct	Swisscom Challenge; Zürich, Switzerland; Tier I event Hard (i) – $1,224,000 – 28S/32Q/16D; Singles – Doubles	(Russia) Elena Bovina (Belgium) Justine Henin; 6–2, 7–6^{(7–2)}	(Federal Republic of Yugoslavia) Jelena Dokić (Russia) Nadia Petrova	(Spain) Conchita Martínez (Belgium) Justine Henin	(United States) Alexandra Stevenson (Slovakia) Daniela Hantuchová (Switzerland) Marie-Gaïané Mikaelian (Belgium) Kim Clijsters
14 Oct	VUB Open; Bratislava, Slovakia; Tier V event Hard (i) – $110,000 – 32S/32Q/16D; Singles – Doubles	(Slovenia) Maja Matevžič; 6–0, 6–1	(Czech Republic) Iveta Benešová	(France) Nathalie Dechy (Italy) Rita Grande	(Slovakia) Ľubomíra Kurhajcová (Slovakia) Eva Fislová (France) Émilie Loit (Paraguay) Rossana de los Ríos
14 Oct	VUB Open; Bratislava, Slovakia; Tier V event Hard (i) – $110,000 – 32S/32Q/16D; Singles – Doubles	(Slovenia) Maja Matevžič (Slovakia) Henrieta Nagyová; 6–4, 6–0	(France) Nathalie Dechy (United States) Meilen Tu	(France) Nathalie Dechy (Italy) Rita Grande	(Slovakia) Ľubomíra Kurhajcová (Slovakia) Eva Fislová (France) Émilie Loit (Paraguay) Rossana de los Ríos
21 Oct	Generali Ladies Linz; Linz, Austria; Tier II event Hard (i) – $585,000 – 28S/32Q/16D; Singles – Doubles	(Belgium) Justine Henin; 6–3, 6–0	(United States) Alexandra Stevenson	(Slovakia) Daniela Hantuchová (United States) Chanda Rubin	(United States) Jennifer Capriati (Israel) Anna Smashnova (Italy) Silvia Farina Elia (Federal Republic of Yugoslavia) Jelena Dokić
21 Oct	Generali Ladies Linz; Linz, Austria; Tier II event Hard (i) – $585,000 – 28S/32Q/16D; Singles – Doubles	(Federal Republic of Yugoslavia) Jelena Dokić (Russia) Nadia Petrova; 6–3, 6–2	(Japan) Rika Fujiwara (Japan) Ai Sugiyama	(Slovakia) Daniela Hantuchová (United States) Chanda Rubin	(United States) Jennifer Capriati (Israel) Anna Smashnova (Italy) Silvia Farina Elia (Federal Republic of Yugoslavia) Jelena Dokić
21 Oct	SEAT Open Luxembourg; Kockelscheuer, Luxembourg; Tier III event Hard (i) – $225,000 – 30S/32Q/16D; Singles – Doubles	(Belgium) Kim Clijsters; 6–1, 6–2	(Bulgaria) Magdalena Maleeva	(France) Virginie Razzano (Slovenia) Katarina Srebotnik	(United States) Laura Granville (Slovakia) Janette Husárová (Slovenia) Tina Pisnik (Russia) Elena Bovina
21 Oct	SEAT Open Luxembourg; Kockelscheuer, Luxembourg; Tier III event Hard (i) – $225,000 – 30S/32Q/16D; Singles – Doubles	(Belgium) Kim Clijsters (Slovakia) Janette Husárová; 4–6, 6–3, 7–5	(Czech Republic) Květa Peschke (Germany) Barbara Rittner	(France) Virginie Razzano (Slovenia) Katarina Srebotnik	(United States) Laura Granville (Slovakia) Janette Husárová (Slovenia) Tina Pisnik (Russia) Elena Bovina
28 Oct	Fed Cup: Final; Las Palmas, Spain, Hard (i)	Slovakia; 2–1	Spain	Italy 1–3; Austria 2–3	

=== November ===
Week	Tournament	Champions	Runners-up	Semifinalists	Quarterfinalists
4 Nov	WTA Tour Championships; Los Angeles, United States; Year-end Championship; Hard (i) – $3,000,000 – 16S/8D; Singles – Doubles	(Belgium) Kim Clijsters; 7–5, 6–3	(United States) Serena Williams	(United States) Jennifer Capriati (United States) Venus Williams	(Federal Republic of Yugoslavia) Jelena Dokić (Bulgaria) Magdalena Maleeva (Belgium) Justine Henin (United States) Monica Seles
4 Nov	WTA Tour Championships; Los Angeles, United States; Year-end Championship; Hard (i) – $3,000,000 – 16S/8D; Singles – Doubles	(Russia) Elena Dementieva (Slovakia) Janette Husárová; 4–6, 6–4, 6–3	(Zimbabwe) Cara Black (Russia) Elena Likhovtseva	(United States) Jennifer Capriati (United States) Venus Williams	(Federal Republic of Yugoslavia) Jelena Dokić (Bulgaria) Magdalena Maleeva (Belgium) Justine Henin (United States) Monica Seles
4 Nov	Volvo Women's Open; Pattaya, Thailand; Tier V event Hard – $110,000 – 32S/28Q/16D; Singles – Doubles	(Indonesia) Angelique Widjaja; 6–2, 6–4	(South Korea) Cho Yoon-jeong	(Russia) Tatiana Panova (Russia) Lina Krasnoroutskaya	(Italy) Adriana Serra Zanetti (Japan) Shinobu Asagoe (Croatia) Silvija Talaja (Thailand) Tamarine Tanasugarn
4 Nov	Volvo Women's Open; Pattaya, Thailand; Tier V event Hard – $110,000 – 32S/28Q/16D; Singles – Doubles	(Republic of Ireland) Kelly Liggan (Czech Republic) Renata Voráčová; 7–5, 7–6^{(9–7)}	(Russia) Lina Krasnoroutskaya (Russia) Tatiana Panova	(Russia) Tatiana Panova (Russia) Lina Krasnoroutskaya	(Italy) Adriana Serra Zanetti (Japan) Shinobu Asagoe (Croatia) Silvija Talaja (Thailand) Tamarine Tanasugarn

== Rankings ==
Below are the 2002 WTA year-end rankings in both singles and doubles competition:

=== Singles ===
Singles Year-end Ranking
No	Player Name	Nation	Points	2001	Change
1	Serena Williams	USA	6,080	6	+5
2	Venus Williams	USA	5,140	3	+1
3	Jennifer Capriati	USA	3,796	2	-1
4	Kim Clijsters	BEL	3,557	5	+1
5	Justine Henin	BEL	3,218	7	+2
6	Amélie Mauresmo	FRA	3,068	9	+3
7	Monica Seles	USA	2,952	10	+3
8	Daniela Hantuchová	SVK	2,668	38	+30
9	Jelena Dokić	YUG	2,506	8	-1
10	Martina Hingis	SUI	2,348	4	-6
11	Anastasia Myskina	RUS	1,908	59	+48
12	Lindsay Davenport	USA	1,795	1	-11
13	Chanda Rubin	USA	1,752	54	+41
14	Magdalena Maleeva	BUL	1,701	16	+2
15	Patty Schnyder	SUI	1,644	37	+22
16	Anna Smashnova	ISR	1,617	87	+71
17	Silvia Farina Elia	ITA	1,596	14	-3
18	Alexandra Stevenson	USA	1,444	60	+42
19	Elena Dementieva	RUS	1,426	15	-4
20	Nathalie Dechy	FRA	1,295	44	+24

==== Number 1 ranking ====
Holder	Date gained	Date forfeited
Lindsay Davenport (USA)	Year-End 2001	13 January 2002
Jennifer Capriati (USA)	14 January 2002	24 February 2002
Venus Williams (USA)	25 February 2002	17 March 2002
Jennifer Capriati (USA)	18 March 2002	21 April 2002
Venus Williams (USA)	22 April 2002	19 May 2002
Jennifer Capriati (USA)	20 May 2002	9 June 2002
Venus Williams (USA)	10 June 2002	7 July 2002
Serena Williams (USA)	8 July 2002	Year-End 2002

=== Doubles ===
Doubles Year-end Ranking
No	Player Name	Nation	Points	2001	Change
1	Paola Suárez	ARG	3,863	6	+5
2	Virginia Ruano Pascual	ESP	3,822	8	+6
3	Lisa Raymond	USA	3,360	1	-2
4	Rennae Stubbs	AUS	3,304	4	=
5	Janette Husárová	SVK	3,107	28	+23
6	Elena Dementieva	RUS	2,765	98	+92
7	Arantxa Sánchez Vicario	ESP	2,256	11	+4
8	Daniela Hantuchová	SVK	2,344	56	+48
9	Cara Black	ZIM	2,085	3	-6
10	Elena Likhovtseva	RUS	2,043	4	-6
11	Anna Kournikova	RUS	1,992	26	+15
12	Ai Sugiyama	JPN	1,912	9	-3
13	Rika Fujiwara	JPN	1,725	135	+122
14	Jelena Dokić	YUG	1,615	12	-2
15	Martina Hingis	SUI	1,504	30	+15
16	Conchita Martínez	ESP	1,372	19	+3
17	Meghann Shaughnessy	USA	1,371	14	-3
18	Liezel Huber	RSA	1,302	21	+3
19	Nicole Arendt	USA	1,232	10	-9
20	Kimberly Po-Messerli	USA	1,153	7	-13

==== Number 1 ranking ====
Holder	Date gained	Date forfeited
Lisa Raymond (USA)	Year-End 2001	8 September 2002
Paola Suárez (ARG)	9 September 2002	Year-End 2002

=== Points distribution ===
Category	W	F	SF	QF	R16	R32	R64	R128	Q	Q3	Q2	Q1
Grand Slam (S)	650	456	292	162	90	56	32	2	26	21	12.5	2
Grand Slam (D)	650	456	292	162	90	56	2	–	22	–	–	–
WTA Championships (S)	485	340	218	121	67	–	–	–	–	–	–	–
WTA Championships (D)	485	340	218	121	–	–	–	–	–	–	–	–
Tier I $2,000,000 (S)	325	228	146	81	45	28	16	1	11	–	6.25	1
Tier I $2,000,000 (D)	325	228	146	81	45	1	–	–	20	–	–	–
Tier I $1,224,000 (56S)	275	193	124	69	38	23	1	–	9.5	–	5.25	1
Tier I $1,224,000 (28S)	275	193	124	69	38	1	–	–	17	9.5	5.25	1
Tier I $1,224,000 (28D)	275	193	124	69	38	1	–	–	17	–	–	–
Tier I $1,224,000 (16D)	275	193	124	69	1	–	–	–	17	–	–	–
Tier II $650,000 (56S)	220	154	99	55	29	15	1	–	7.75	–	4.5	1
Tier II $650,000 (28S)	220	154	99	55	29	1	–	–	13.25	7.75	4.5	1
Tier II $650,000 (16D)	220	154	99	55	1	–	–	–	13	–	–	–
Tier II $585,000 (56S)	195	137	88	49	25	14	1	–	6.75	–	4	1
Tier II $585,000 (28S)	195	137	88	49	25	1	–	–	11.75	6.75	4	1
Tier II $585,000 (16D)	195	137	88	49	1	–	–	–	11.75	–	–	–
Tier III $225,000 (30S)	145	103	66	37	19	1	–	–	4.5	–	2.75	1
Tier III $225,000 (16D)	145	103	66	37	1	–	–	–	–	–	–	–
Tier III $170,000 (56S)	120	85	55	30	16	9	1	–	3.75	–	2.25	1
Tier III $170,000 (30S)	120	85	55	30	16	1	–	–	7.25	3.75	2.25	1
Tier III $170,000 (16D)	120	85	55	30	1	–	–	–	7.5	–	–	–
Tier IV $140,000 (S)	95	67	43	24	12	1	–	–	5.5	3.5	2	1
Tier IV $140,000 (D)	95	67	43	24	1	–	–	–	6.25	–	–	–
Tier V $110,000 (S)	80	56	36	20	10	1	–	–	4.5	3	2	1
Tier V $110,000 (D)	80	56	36	20	1	–	–	–	5	–	–	–

== Statistics ==
List of players and titles won, last name alphabetically:

- (United States) Serena Williams – Scottsdale, Miami, Rome, French Open, Wimbledon, U.S. Open, Tokyo Princess Cup and Leipzig (8)
- (United States) Venus Williams – Gold Coast, Paris, Antwerp, Amelia Island, Stanford, San Diego and New Haven (7)
- (Belgium) Kim Clijsters – Hamburg, Filderstadt, Luxembourg and WTA Tour Championships (4)
- (Israel) Anna Smashnova – Auckland, Canberra, Vienna and Shanghai (4)
- (Russia) Elena Bovina – Warsaw and Quebec City (2)
- (Federal Republic of Yugoslavia) Jelena Dokić – Sarasota and Birmingham (2)
- (Belgium) Justine Henin – Berlin and Linz (2)
- (Switzerland) Martina Hingis – Sydney and Tokyo Pan Pacific (2)
- (Russia) Svetlana Kuznetsova – Espoo and Bali (2)
- (France) Amélie Mauresmo – Dubai and Montreal (2)
- (United States) Chanda Rubin – Eastbourne and Los Angeles (2)
- (United States) Monica Seles – Doha and Madrid (2)
- (Zimbabwe) Cara Black – Waikoloa (1)
- (United States) Jennifer Capriati – Australian Open (1)
- (Switzerland) Myriam Casanova – Brussels (1)
- (United States) Jill Craybas – Tokyo Japan Open (1)
- (Greece) Eleni Daniilidou – 's-Hertogenbosch (1)
- (Argentina) Mariana Díaz Oliva – Palermo (1)
- (Italy) Silvia Farina Elia – Strasbourg (1)
- (Switzerland) Marie-Gayanay Mikaelian – Tashkent (1)
- (Slovakia) Daniela Hantuchová – Indian Wells (1)
- (Croatia) Iva Majoli – Charleston (1)
- (Bulgaria) Magdalena Maleeva – Moscow (1)
- (Slovenia) Maja Matevžič – Bratislava (1)
- (Spain) Ángeles Montolio – Porto (1)
- (Germany) Martina Müller – Budapest (1)
- (Russia) Anastasia Myskina – Bahia (1)
- (United States) Lisa Raymond – Memphis (1)
- (Russia) Dinara Safina – Sopot (1)
- (Switzerland) Patty Schnyder – Zurich (1)
- (Spain) Magüi Serna – Estoril (1)
- (Slovenia) Katarina Srebotnik – Acapulco (1)
- (Slovakia) Martina Suchá – Hobart (1)
- (Sweden) Åsa Svensson – Bol (1)
- (Austria) Patricia Wartusch – Casablanca (1)
- (Indonesia) Angelique Widjaja – Pattaya City (1)
- (Colombia) Fabiola Zuluaga – Bogotá (1)

The following players won their first title:

- (Slovakia) Martina Suchá – Hobart
- (Slovakia) Daniela Hantuchová – Indian Wells
- (Spain) Magüi Serna – Estoril
- (Germany) Martina Müller – Budapest
- (Russia) Elena Bovina – Warsaw
- (Switzerland) Marie-Gayanay Mikaelian – Tashkent
- (Greece) Eleni Daniilidou – 's-Hertogenbosch
- (Switzerland) Myriam Casanova – Brussels
- (Argentina) Mariana Díaz Oliva – Palermo
- (Russia) Dinara Safina – Sopot
- (Russia) Svetlana Kuznetsova – Espoo
- (Zimbabwe) Cara Black – Waikoloa
- (United States) Jill Craybas – Tokyo Japan Open
- (Slovenia) Maja Matevžič – Bratislava

Titles won by nation:

- United States – 22 (Gold Coast, Australian Open, Paris, Antwerp, Doha, Memphis, Scottsdale, Miami, Amelia Island, Rome, Madrid, French Open, Eastbourne, Wimbledon, Stanford, San Diego, Los Angeles, New Haven, U.S. Open, Tokyo Princess Cup, Leipzig and Tokyo Japan Open)
- Belgium – 6 (Hamburg, Berlin, Filderstadt, Linz, Luxembourg and WTA Tour Championships)
- Russia – 6 (Warsaw, Sopot, Espoo, Bahia, Quebec City and Bali)
- Switzerland – 5 (Sydney, Tokyo Pan Pacific, Tashkent, Brussels and Zurich)
- Israel – 4 (Auckland, Canberra, Vienna and Shanghai)
- Spain – 2 (Porto and Estoril)
- France – 2 (Dubai and Montreal)
- Slovenia – 2 (Acapulco and Bratislava)
- Slovakia – 2 (Hobart and Indian Wells)
- FR Yugoslavia – 2 (Sarasota and Birmingham)
- Argentina – 1 (Palermo)
- Austria – 1 (Casablanca)
- Bulgaria – 1 (Moscow)
- Colombia – 1 (Bogotá)
- Croatia – 1 (Charleston)
- Germany – 1 (Budapest)
- Greece – 1 ('s-Hertogenbosch)
- Indonesia – 1 (Pattaya City)
- Italy – 1 (Strasbourg)
- Sweden – 1 (Bol)
- Zimbabwe – 1 (Waikoloa)

== See also ==
- 2002 ATP Tour
- WTA Tour
- List of female tennis players
- List of tennis tournaments
