= 2002 Wismilak International =

- Date: 23–29 September
- Edition: 8th
- Category: Tier III
- Draw: 30S / 16D
- Prize money: $225,000
- Surface: Hard / outdoor
- Location: Bali, Indonesia

Champions

Singles
- (Russia) Svetlana Kuznetsova

Doubles
- (Zimbabwe) Cara Black / (Spain) Virginia Ruano Pascual
- Wismilak International

The 2002 Wismilak International was a women's tennis tournament played on outdoor hard courts in Bali, Indonesia that was part of the Tier III category of the 2002 WTA Tour. It was the eighth edition of the tournament and was held from 23 September through 29 September 2002. Unseeded Svetlana Kuznetsova won the singles title and earned $35,000 first-prize money.

== Finals ==
=== Singles ===
- (Russia) Svetlana Kuznetsova defeated (Spain) Conchita Martínez, 3–6, 7–6^{(7–4)}, 7–5

This was Kuznetsova's second WTA Tour singles title, and her second of the year.

=== Doubles ===
- (Zimbabwe) Cara Black / (Spain) Virginia Ruano Pascual defeated (Russia) Svetlana Kuznetsova / (Spain) Arantxa Sánchez Vicario, 6–2, 6–3

This was Black's 10th WTA Tour doubles title, and second of the year, and was Pascual's 15th WTA Tour singles title, and sixth of the year. This was their first and only WTA Tour title won together as a pair.

== Singles main draw entrants ==
=== Seeds ===
Country	Player	Rank	Seed
THA	Tamarine Tanasugarn	28	1
ESP	Arantxa Sánchez Vicario	34	2
ARG	Clarisa Fernández	35	3
AUS	Nicole Pratt	46	4
ITA	Adriana Serra Zanetti	49	5
ZIM	Cara Black	51	6
SUI	Emmanuelle Gagliardi	52	7
ESP	Conchita Martínez	54	8

Rankings are as of 16 September 2002.

=== Other entrants ===
The following players received wildcards into the singles main draw:

- (Spain) Gala León García
- (Russia) Maria Kirilenko
- (France) Virginie Razzano

The following players received entry from the qualifying draw:

- (Republic of Ireland) Kelly Liggan
- (Japan) Akiko Morigami
- (Italy) Antonella Serra Zanetti
- (United States) Sarah Taylor

The following player received entry as a lucky loser:

- (Australia) Evie Dominikovic

=== Withdrawals ===
- (France) Mary Pierce → replaced by (Russia) Lina Krasnoroutskaya
- (Slovenia) Tina Pisnik → replaced by (Australia) Alicia Molik
- (Germany) Angelika Rösch → replaced by (Australia) Evie Dominikovic

== Doubles main draw entrants ==
=== Seeds ===
Country	Player	Country	Player	Player 1 Rank	Player 2 Rank	Seed
ZIM	Cara Black	ESP	Virginia Ruano Pascual	11	2	1
ESP	Conchita Martínez	ARG	Patricia Tarabini	21	41	2
RUS	Svetlana Kuznetsova	ESP	Arantxa Sánchez Vicario	76	9	3
INA	Wynne Prakusya	INA	Angelique Widjaja	30	87	4

Rankings are as of 10 October 2003

=== Other entrants ===
The following pair received wildcards into the doubles main draw:

- (Indonesia) Liza Andriyani / (Indonesia) Wukirasih Sawondari

The following pair received entry from the qualifying draw:

- (France) Virginie Razzano / (Croatia) Silvija Talaja
