= 2002 Acura Classic – Singles =

Singles
- 2002 Acura Classic

Final
- Champion: (United States) Venus Williams
- Runner-up: (Federal Republic of Yugoslavia) Jelena Dokic
- Score: 6–2, 6–2

Details
- Draw: 48
- Seeds: 16

Events
Singles	Doubles
- Acura Classic

Venus Williams was the defending champion and successfully defended her title by defeating Jelena Dokic 6–2, 6–2 in the final.

== Seeds ==
All seeds received a bye into the second round.

1. (United States) Venus Williams (champion)
2. (United States) Jennifer Capriati (quarterfinals)
3. (United States) Lindsay Davenport (semifinals)
4. (United States) ~~Monica Seles~~ (withdrew)
5. (Belgium) Kim Clijsters (quarterfinals)
6. (Federal Republic of Yugoslavia) Jelena Dokic (final)
7. (Slovakia) Daniela Hantuchová (second round)
8. (Russia) Elena Dementieva (third round)
9. (Russia) Anastasia Myskina (third round)
10. (Bulgaria) Magdalena Maleeva (quarterfinals)
11. (Czech Republic) Dája Bedáňová (second round)
12. (Israel) Anna Smashnova (quarterfinals)
13. (United States) Meghann Shaughnessy (third round)
14. (United States) Chanda Rubin (third round)
15. (Luxembourg) Anne Kremer (third round)
16. (Russia) Tatiana Panova (second round)

== Draw ==
Key

- Q = Qualifier
- WC = Wild card
- LL = Lucky loser
- Alt = Alternate
- ITF = ITF entry
- PR = Protected ranking
- SR = Special ranking
- SE = Special exempt
- JE = Junior exempt
- JR = Junior Accelerator Programme entrant
- CO = College Accelerator Programme entrant
- NG = Next Gen Accelerator Program entrant
- w/o = Walkover
- r = Retired
- d = Defaulted

=== Finals ===
Quarterfinals
1	(United States) Venus Williams	6	5	6
5	(Belgium) Kim Clijsters	3	7	4
3/PR	(United States) Lindsay Davenport	6	6
(Japan) Ai Sugiyama	1	1
12	(Israel) Anna Smashnova	6	3	4
(Russia) Anna Kournikova	1	6	6
6	(Federal Republic of Yugoslavia) Jelena Dokic	2	6	6
2	(United States) Jennifer Capriati	6	2	4

Semifinals
1	(United States) Venus Williams	6	6
3/PR	(United States) Lindsay Davenport	2	1
(Russia) Anna Kournikova	7^{8}	6^{2}	0
6	(Federal Republic of Yugoslavia) Jelena Dokic	6^{6}	7^{7}	6

Final
1	(United States) Venus Williams	6	6
6	(Federal Republic of Yugoslavia) Jelena Dokic	2	2

=== Top half ===
==== Section 1 ====
First round
(Italy) A Serra Zanetti	3	1
(Slovakia) J Husárová	6	6
Q	(Germany) G Arn	3	6	6
WC	(France) M Pierce	6	3	4
(Slovenia) T Pisnik	7	2	0
(France) N Dechy	5	6	6
(Greece) E Daniilidou	6	6
(Switzerland) E Gagliardi	2	1

Second round
1	(United States) V Williams	6	6
(Slovakia) J Husárová	4	1
Q	(Germany) G Arn	7	3	0
15	(Luxembourg) A Kremer	5	6	6
10	(Bulgaria) M Maleeva	7	7
(France) N Dechy	5	5
(Greece) E Daniilidou	3	1
5	(Belgium) K Clijsters	6	6

Third round
1	(United States) V Williams	6	6
15	(Luxembourg) A Kremer	3	2
10	(Bulgaria) M Maleeva	3	3
5	(Belgium) K Clijsters	6	6

Quarterfinals
1	(United States) V Williams	6	5	6
5	(Belgium) K Clijsters	3	7	4

==== Section 2 ====
First round
(Uzbekistan) I Tulyaganova	4	3
(Switzerland) MG Mikaelian	6	6
Q	(United States) S Taylor	2	2
(South Africa) A Coetzer	6	6
(Slovenia) K Srebotnik	6	6
WC	(United States) A Bradshaw	2	4
(United States) L Raymond	5	0
(Japan) A Sugiyama	7	6

Second round
3/PR	(United States) L Davenport	6	6
(Switzerland) MG Mikaelian	3	0
(South Africa) A Coetzer	1	1
14	(United States) C Rubin	6	6
11	(Czech Republic) D Bedáňová	4	6	2
(Slovenia) K Srebotnik	6	3	6
(Japan) A Sugiyama	6	1	7
7	(Slovakia) D Hantuchová	4	6	5

Third round
3/PR	(United States) L Davenport	6	2	6
14	(United States) C Rubin	2	6	1
(Slovenia) K Srebotnik	4	6^{4}
(Japan) A Sugiyama	6	7^{7}

Quarterfinals
3/PR	(United States) L Davenport	6	6
(Japan) A Sugiyama	1	1

=== Bottom half ===
==== Section 3 ====
First round
Q	(Indonesia) W Prakusya	6^{3}	0
(Argentina) P Suárez	7^{7}	6
(United States) A Frazier	3	4
(United States) M Irvin	6	6
(Russia) E Likhovtseva	2	7^{7}	2
WC	(Spain) C Martínez	6	6^{2}	6
(United States) A Stevenson	0	1
(Russia) A Kournikova	6	6

Second round
8	(Russia) E Dementieva	6	6
(Argentina) P Suárez	4	2
(United States) M Irvin	7	1	1
12	(Israel) A Smashnova	5	6	6
16	(Russia) T Panova	7	2	6^{4}
WC	(Spain) C Martínez	5	6	7^{7}
(Russia) A Kournikova	6	6
LL	(United States) J Hopkins	2	4

Third round
8	(Russia) E Dementieva	2	7	6^{2}
12	(Israel) A Smashnova	6	5	7^{7}
WC	(Spain) C Martínez	6	2	1
(Russia) A Kournikova	1	6	6

Quarterfinals
12	(Israel) A Smashnova	6	3	4
(Russia) A Kournikova	1	6	6

==== Section 4 ====
First round
(Spain) G León García	6	6
(Australia) A Molik	3	2
(Thailand) T Tanasugarn	3	2
(Italy) F Schiavone	6	6
Q	(Zimbabwe) C Black	5	3
(United States) M Tu	7	6
(Italy) R Grande	1	6^{4}
WC	(United States) A Harkleroad	6	7^{7}

Second round
6	(Federal Republic of Yugoslavia) J Dokic	6	7
(Spain) G León García	2	5
(Italy) F Schiavone	6	3	4
9	(Russia) A Myskina	1	6	6
13	(United States) M Shaughnessy	6	6
(United States) M Tu	1	2
WC	(United States) A Harkleroad	0	3
2	(United States) J Capriati	6	6

Third round
6	(Federal Republic of Yugoslavia) J Dokic	6	6
9	(Russia) A Myskina	4	3
13	(United States) M Shaughnessy	4	1
2	(United States) J Capriati	6	6

Quarterfinals
6	(Federal Republic of Yugoslavia) J Dokic	2	6	6
2	(United States) J Capriati	6	2	4
