= 2002 French Community Championships =

- Date: 8–14 July
- Edition: 9th
- Category: Tier IV
- Draw: 32S / 16D
- Prize money: $140,000
- Surface: Clay / outdoor
- Location: Brussels, Belgium

Champions

Singles
- (Switzerland) Myriam Casanova

Doubles
- (Austria) Barbara Schwartz / (Germany) Jasmin Wöhr
- WTA Knokke-Heist

The 2002 French Community Championships was a women's tennis tournament played on outdoor clay courts in Brussels, Belgium that was part of the Tier IV category of the 2002 WTA Tour. It was the ninth and last edition of the tournament and was held from 8 July until 14 July 2002. Unseeded Myriam Casanova won the singles title and the accompanying $22,000 first-prize money.

== Finals ==
=== Singles ===
(Switzerland) Myriam Casanova defeated (Spain) Arantxa Sánchez Vicario, 4–6, 6–2, 6–1

- It was Casanova's only singles title of her career.

=== Doubles ===
(Austria) Barbara Schwartz / (Germany) Jasmin Wöhr defeated (Italy) Tathiana Garbin / (Spain) Arantxa Sánchez Vicario, 6–2, 0–6, 6–4
