= 2002 Acura Classic =

- Date: July 29 – August 4
- Edition: 24th
- Category: Tier II
- Draw: 56S / 16D
- Prize money: $775,000
- Surface: Hard / outdoor
- Location: San Diego, California, U.S.

Champions

Singles
- (United States) Venus Williams

Doubles
- (Russia) Elena Dementieva / (Slovakia) Janette Husárová
- Southern California Open

The 2002 Acura Classic was a women's tennis tournament played on outdoor hard courts in San Diego in the United States. It was part of Tier II of the 2002 WTA Tour. It was the 24th edition of the tournament and was held from July 29 through August 4, 2002. First-seeded Venus Williams won her third consecutive singles title at the event and earned $115,000 first-prize money as well as 220 ranking points.

== Finals ==
=== Singles ===
(United States) Venus Williams defeated (Australia) Jelena Dokić, 6–2, 6–2

- It was Williams's 5th singles title of the year and the 27th of her career.

=== Doubles ===
(Russia) Elena Dementieva / (Slovakia) Janette Husárová defeated (Slovakia) Daniela Hantuchová / (Japan) Ai Sugiyama, 6–2, 6–4

- It was Dementieva's 2nd title of her career. It was Husárová's 3rd title of the year and the 12th of her career.
