= 2002 State Farm Women's Tennis Classic =

- Date: February 25 – March 3
- Edition: 3rd
- Category: Tier II
- Draw: 28S / 16D
- Prize money: $585,000
- Surface: Hard / outdoor
- Location: Scottsdale, Arizona . U.S.

Champions

Singles
- (United States) Serena Williams

Doubles
- (United States) Lisa Raymond / (Australia) Rennae Stubbs
← 2001 ·	State Farm Women's Tennis Classic	· 2003 →

The 2002 State Farm Women's Tennis Classic was a women's tennis tournament played on outdoor hard courts in Scottsdale, Arizona, United States that was part of the Tier II category of the 2002 WTA Tour. It was the third edition of the tournament and ran from February 26 through March 3, 2002. Third-seeded Serena Williams won the singles title and earned $93,000 first-prize money.

== Finals ==
=== Singles ===
(United States) Serena Williams defeated (United States) Jennifer Capriati 6–2, 4–6, 6–4

- It was Williams' 1st singles title of the year and the 12th of her career.

=== Doubles ===
(United States) Lisa Raymond / (Australia) Rennae Stubbs defeated (Zimbabwe) Cara Black / (Russia) Elena Likhovtseva 6–3, 5–7, 7–6
