= 2002 Qatar TotalFinaElf Open =

- Date: 11–17 February
- Edition: 2nd
- Category: Tier III
- Draw: 30S / 16D
- Prize money: $170,000
- Surface: Hard / outdoor
- Location: Doha, Qatar
- Venue: Khalifa International Tennis Complex

Champions

Singles
- (Switzerland) Monica Seles

Doubles
- (Slovakia) Janette Husárová / (Spain) Arantxa Sánchez Vicario
- WTA Qatar Open

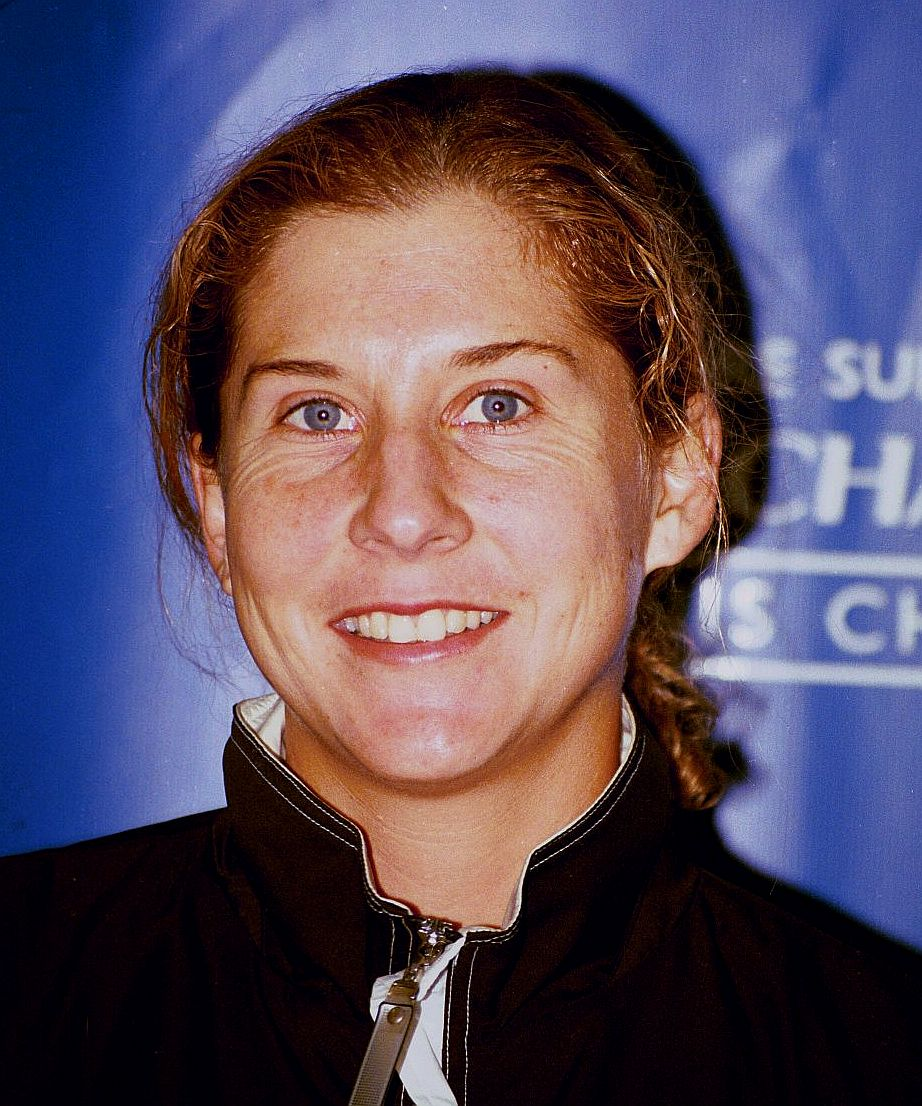

The 2002 Qatar TotalFinaElf Open was a women's tennis tournament played on outdoor hard courts at the Khalifa International Tennis Complex in Doha in Qatar and was part of the Tier III category of the 2002 WTA Tour. It was the second edition of the tournament and was held from 11 February through 17 February 2002. First-seeded Monica Seles won the singles title and earned $27,000 first-prize money.

== Finals ==
=== Singles ===
(United States) Monica Seles defeated (Thailand) Tamarine Tanasugarn 7–6^{(8–6)}, 6–3

- It was Seles' 1st singles title of the year and the 52nd of her career.

=== Doubles ===
(Slovakia) Janette Husárová / (Spain) Arantxa Sánchez Vicario defeated (France) Alexandra Fusai / (Netherlands) Caroline Vis 6–3, 6–3

- It was Husárová's 1st doubles title of the year and the 10th of her career. It was Sánchez Vicario's 1st doubles title of the year and the 63rd of her career.
