= 2002 Wismilak International – Singles =

Singles
- 2002 Wismilak International

Final
- Champion: (Russia) Svetlana Kuznetsova
- Runner-up: (Spain) Conchita Martínez
- Score: 3–6, 7–6^{(7–4)}, 7–5

Details
- Draw: 30
- Seeds: 8

Events
Singles	Doubles
← 2001 ·	Commonwealth Bank Tennis Classic	· 2003 →

Angelique Widjaja was the defending champion, however she was defeated in the first round by Marta Marrero.

Svetlana Kuznetsova won the title, defeating Conchita Martínez in the final, 3–6, 7–6^{(7–4)}, 7–5.

== Seeds ==
The top two seeds who played received a bye into the second round.

1. (Thailand) Tamarine Tanasugarn (second round)
2. (Spain) Arantxa Sánchez Vicario (semifinal)
3. (Argentina) Clarisa Fernández (first round)
4. (Australia) Nicole Pratt (second round)
5. (Italy) Adriana Serra Zanetti (first round)
6. (Zimbabwe) Cara Black (first round)
7. (Switzerland) Emmanuelle Gagliardi (second round)
8. (Spain) Conchita Martínez (final)

== Draw ==
=== Key ===
- Q = Qualifier
- WC = Wild card
- LL = Lucky loser
- Alt = Alternate
- SE = Special exempt
- PR = Protected ranking
- ITF = ITF entry
- JE = Junior exempt
- w/o = Walkover
- r = Retired
- d = Defaulted
- SR = Special ranking

=== Finals ===
Semifinals
8	(Spain) Conchita Martínez	6	6
Q	(United States) Sarah Taylor	0	3
(Russia) Svetlana Kuznetsova	7	6
2	(Spain) Arantxa Sánchez Vicario	5	4

Finals
8	(Spain) Conchita Martínez	6	6^{4}	5
(Russia) Svetlana Kuznetsova	3	7^{7}	7

=== Top half ===
First round
(Paraguay) R de los Ríos	6	7^{7}
Q	(Japan) A Morgiami	3	6^{3}
(Indonesia) W Prakusya	7	6
WC	(Spain) G León García	5	3
(Croatia) J Kostanić	2	4
8	(Spain) C Martínez	6	6
4	(Australia) N Pratt	6	6
WC	(Russia) M Kirilenko	2	4
(Indonesia) A Widjaja	4	3
(Spain) M Marrero	6	6
(Spain) C Torrens Valero	2	4
(United States) C Morariu	6	6
Q	(United States) S Taylor	6	7
5	(Italy) Ad Serra Zanetti	2	5

Second round
1	(Thailand) T Tanasugarn	6	4	2
(Paraguay) R de los Ríos	2	6	6
(Indonesia) W Prakusya	3	6	1
8	(Spain) C Martínez	6	3	6
4	(Australia) N Pratt	5	3
(Spain) M Marrero	7	6
(United States) C Morariu	2	2^{r}
Q	(United States) S Taylor	6	1

Quarterfinals
(Paraguay) R de los Ríos	1	3
8	(Spain) C Martínez	6	6
(Spain) M Marrero	3	5
Q	(United States) S Taylor	6	7

Semifinals
8	(Spain) C Martínez	6	6
Q	(United States) S Taylor	0	3

=== Bottom half ===
First round
6	(Zimbabwe) C Black	6	2	6^{5}
(Russia) L Krasanoroutskaya	2	6	7^{7}
(Croatia) S Talaja	6^{4}	6	3
Q	(Italy) An Serra Zanetti	7^{7}	1	6
(Russia) S Kuznetsova	6	6
(Australia) A Molik	2	4
WC	(France) V Razzano	6	6
3	(Argentina) C Fernández	3	3
7	(Switzerland) E Gagliardi	7^{7}	5	6
Q	(Republic of Ireland) K Liggan	6^{3}	7	4
(Japan) S Obata	7	6
(United States) J Craybas	5	3
LL	(Australia) E Dominikovic	2	0
(Spain) V Ruano Pascual	6	6

Second round
(Russia) L Krasnoroutskaya	6	7
Q	(Italy) An Serra Zanetti	1	5
(Russia) S Kuznetsova	7^{9}	4	6
WC	(France) V Razzano	6^{7}	6	2
7	(Switzerland) E Gagliardi	2	5
(Japan) S Obata	6	7
(Spain) V Ruano Pascual	2	6^{6}
2	(Spain) A Sánchez Vicario	6	7^{8}

Quarterfinals
(Russia) L Krasnoroutskaya	3	0^{r}
(Russia) S Kuznetsova	6	0
(Japan) S Obata	3	6	0
2	(Spain) A Sánchez Vicario	6	4	6

Semifinals
(Russia) S Kuznetsova	7	6
2	(Spain) A Sánchez Vicario	5	4

== Qualifying ==
=== Seeds ===
1. (Italy) Antonella Serra Zanetti (qualified)
2. (United States) Sarah Taylor (qualified)
3. (Australia) Evie Dominikovic (qualifying competition; Lucky loser)
4. (Japan) Akiko Morigami (qualified)
5. (United States) Ansley Cargill (qualifying competition)
6. (Canada) Vanessa Webb (second round)
7. (Slovakia) Zuzana Kučová (second round)
8. (Australia) Amanda Grahame (qualifying competition)

=== Qualifiers ===
1. (Italy) Antonella Serra Zanetti
2. (United States) Sarah Taylor
3. (Republic of Ireland) Kelly Liggan
4. (Japan) Akiko Morigami

=== Lucky loser ===
1. (Australia) Evie Dominikovic

=== Draw ===
==== First qualifier ====
First round
1	(Italy) Antonella Serra Zanetti	6	6
(United States) Amanda Augustus	0	2
(Sweden) Helena Ejeson	6^{1}	6	7
(Japan) Yumiko Kitamura	7^{7}	1	5
(Australia) Trudi Musgrave	6	6
(Australia) Michelle Summerside	2	1
(Japan) Ayami Takase	0	2
5	(United States) Ansley Cargill	6	6

Second round
1	(Italy) Antonella Serra Zanetti	3	6	6
(Sweden) Helena Ejeson	6	1	3
(United States) Trudi Musgrave	6	0	3
5	(United States) Ansley Cargill	3	6	6

Qualifying competition
1	(Italy) Antonella Serra Zanetti	6	6
5	(United States) Ansley Cargill	4	4

==== Second qualifier ====
First round
2	(United States) Sarah Taylor	6	6
(United States) Katie Schlukebir	1	1
(South Korea) Chang Kyung-mi	6	6
(Indonesia) Diana Julianto	0	2
(Indonesia) Wukirasih Sawondari	2	6^{9}
(Poland) Joanna Sakowicz	6	7^{11}
(Australia) Tiffany Welford	0	7^{7}	3
7	(Slovakia) Zuzana Kučová	6	6^{2}	6

Second round
2	(United States) Sarah Taylor	6	6
(South Korea) Chang Kyung-mi	0	2
(Poland) Joanna Sakowicz	6	6
7	(Slovakia) Zuzana Kučová	2	4

Qualifying competition
2	(United States) Sarah Taylor	6	6
(Poland) Joanna Sakowicz	2	1

==== Third qualifier ====
First round
3	(Australia) Evie Dominikovic	6	6
(Latvia) Līga Dekmeijere	3	2
(South Korea) Kim Jin-hee	2	6	2
(Indonesia) Liza Andriyani	6	1	6
(Australia) Mirielle Dittmann	3	2
(Republic of Ireland) Kelly Liggan	6	6
(Japan) Rika Hiraki	1	2
6	(Canada) Vanessa Webb	6	6

Second round
3	(Australia) Evie Dominikovic	7^{7}	6
(Indonesia) Liza Andriyani	6^{1}	3
(Republic of Ireland) Kelly Liggan	6	7
6	(Canada) Vanessa Webb	4	5

Qualifying competition
3	(Australia) Evie Dominikovic	0	4
(Republic of Ireland) Kelly Liggan	6	6

==== Fourth qualifier ====
First round
4	(Japan) Akiko Morigami	6	6
(Thailand) Prariyawan Ratanakrong	0	1
(Russia) Olga Kalyuzhnaya	6	6
WC	(Indonesia) Sandy Gumulya	1	2
WC	(Czech Republic) Kateřina Böhmová	4	4
(Canada) Renata Kolbovic	6	6
(Australia) Jenny Belobrajdic	1	3
8	(Australia) Amanda Grahame	6	6

Second round
4	(Japan) Akiko Morigami	4	6	6
(Russia) Olga Kalyuzhnaya	6	4	3
(Canada) Renata Kolbovic	3	4
8	(Australia) Amanda Grahame	6	6

Qualifying competition
4	(Japan) Akiko Morigami	6	6
8	(Australia) Amanda Grahame	2	3
