= 2002 Acura Classic – Doubles =

Doubles
- 2002 Acura Classic

Final
- Champions: (Russia) Elena Dementieva (Slovakia) Janette Husárová
- Runners-up: (Slovakia) Daniela Hantuchová (Japan) Ai Sugiyama
- Score: 6–2, 6–4

Details
- Draw: 16
- Seeds: 4

Events
Singles	Doubles
- Acura Classic

Cara Black and Elena Likhovtseva were the defending champions, but lost in semifinals to tournament winners Elena Dementieva and Janette Husárová

Dementieva and Husárová defeated Daniela Hantuchová and Ai Sugiyama 6–2, 6–4 in the final.

== Seeds ==
1. (United States) Lisa Raymond / (Australia) Rennae Stubbs (quarterfinals)
2. (Zimbabwe) Cara Black / (Russia) Elena Likhovtseva (semifinals)
3. (Slovakia) Daniela Hantuchová / (Japan) Ai Sugiyama (final)
4. (Russia) Elena Dementieva / (Slovakia) Janette Husárová (champions)

== Draw ==
Key

- Q = Qualifier
- WC = Wild card
- LL = Lucky loser
- Alt = Alternate
- ITF = ITF entry
- PR = Protected ranking
- SR = Special ranking
- SE = Special exempt
- JE = Junior exempt
- JR = Junior Accelerator Programme entrant
- CO = College Accelerator Programme entrant
- NG = Next Gen Accelerator Program entrant
- w/o = Walkover
- r = Retired
- d = Defaulted

=== Draw ===
First round
1	(United States) L Raymond (Australia) R Stubbs	6	6
(Slovenia) T Križan (Slovenia) K Srebotnik	4	3
(France) A Fusai (Netherlands) C Vis	4	4
(Argentina) P Suárez (Uzbekistan) I Tulyaganova	6	6
3	(Slovakia) D Hantuchová (Japan) A Sugiyama	6	6^{8}	6
(France) N Dechy (United States) M Tu	2	7^{10}	4
WC	(United States) C Morariu (United States) K Po-Messerli	2	6	5
(United States) C Rubin (United States) M Shaughnessy	6	3	7
(Italy) R Grande (Argentina) P Tarabini	4	5
Q	(Russia) T Panova (Venezuela) M Vento-Kabchi	6	7
(Belgium) K Clijsters (Federal Republic of Yugoslavia) J Dokic	6^{4}	6	4
4	(Russia) E Dementieva (Slovakia) J Husárová	7^{7}	4	6
(South Africa) A Coetzer (United States) L McNeil	6	1	6
(Chinese Taipei) J Lee (Indonesia) W Prakusya	4	6	4
(Spain) C Martínez (France) M Pierce	1	1
2	(Zimbabwe) C Black (Russia) E Likhovtseva	6	6

Quarterfinals
1	(United States) L Raymond (Australia) R Stubbs	4	4
(Argentina) P Suárez (Uzbekistan) I Tulyaganova	6	6
3	(Slovakia) D Hantuchová (Japan) A Sugiyama	7^{7}	2	6
(United States) C Rubin (United States) M Shaughnessy	6^{5}	6	2
Q	(Russia) T Panova (Venezuela) M Vento-Kabchi	6^{4}	1
4	(Russia) E Dementieva (Slovakia) J Husárová	7^{7}	6
(South Africa) A Coetzer (United States) L McNeil	2	2
2	(Zimbabwe) C Black (Russia) E Likhovtseva	6	6

Semifinals
(Argentina) P Suárez (Uzbekistan) I Tulyaganova	4	3
3	(Slovakia) D Hantuchová (Japan) A Sugiyama	6	6
4	(Russia) E Dementieva (Slovakia) J Husárová	6	6
2	(Zimbabwe) C Black (Russia) E Likhovtseva	3	4

Final
3	(Slovakia) D Hantuchová (Japan) A Sugiyama	2	4
4	(Russia) E Dementieva (Slovakia) J Husárová	6	6
