= 2002 Wismilak International – Doubles =

Doubles
- 2002 Wismilak International

Final
- Champions: (Zimbabwe) Cara Black (Spain) Virginia Ruano Pascual
- Runners-up: (Russia) Svetlana Kuznetsova (Spain) Arantxa Sánchez Vicario
- Score: 6–2, 6–3

Details
- Draw: 16 (1WC/1Q)
- Seeds: 4

Events
Singles	Doubles
- Commonwealth Bank Tennis Classic

Evie Dominikovic and Tamarine Tanasugarn were the defending champions, but Tanasugarn did not compete this year to prioritize the singles tournament. Dominikovic teamed up with Katie Schlukebir and lost in the first round to Cara Black and Virginia Ruano Pascual.

Black and Ruano Pascual won the title by defeating Svetlana Kuznetsova and Arantxa Sánchez Vicario 6–2, 6–3 in the final.

== Seeds ==
1. (Zimbabwe) Cara Black / (Spain) Virginia Ruano Pascual (champions)
2. (Spain) Conchita Martínez / (Argentina) Patricia Tarabini (semifinals, withdrew)
3. (Russia) Svetlana Kuznetsova / (Spain) Arantxa Sánchez Vicario (final)
4. (Indonesia) Wynne Prakusya / (Indonesia) Angelique Widjaja (first round)

== Draw ==
Key

- Q = Qualifier
- WC = Wild card
- LL = Lucky loser
- Alt = Alternate
- ITF = ITF entry
- PR = Protected ranking
- SR = Special ranking
- SE = Special exempt
- JE = Junior exempt
- JR = Junior Accelerator Programme entrant
- CO = College Accelerator Programme entrant
- NG = Next Gen Accelerator Program entrant
- w/o = Walkover
- r = Retired
- d = Defaulted

=== Draw ===
First round
1	(Zimbabwe) C Black (Spain) V Ruano Pascual	3	6	6
(Australia) E Dominikovic (United States) K Schlukebir	6	1	0
(Croatia) J Kostanić (Canada) V Webb	6	1	6
(Japan) R Hiraki (Paraguay) R de los Ríos	2	6	2
4	(Indonesia) W Prakusya (Indonesia) A Widjaja	2	6	5
(United States) A Cargill (Republic of Ireland) K Liggan	6	3	7
Q	(France) V Razzano (Croatia) S Talaja	6	6
(Italy) Ad Serra Zanetti (Italy) An Serra Zanetti	4	0
(Argentina) C Fernández (Switzerland) E Gagliardi	4	4
(United States) C Morariu (Australia) N Pratt	6	6
WC	(Indonesia) L Andriyani (Indonesia) W Sawondari	3	7	4
3	(Russia) S Kuznetsova (Spain) A Sánchez Vicario	6	5	6
(Russia) L Krasnoroutskaya (Australia) T Musgrave	3	6	4
(Spain) M Marrero (Australia) A Molik	6	2	6
(United States) A Augustus (Canada) R Kolbovic	1	5
2	(Spain) C Martínez (Argentina) P Tarabini	6	7

Quarterfinals
1	(Zimbabwe) C Black (Spain) V Ruano Pascual	6	7^{7}
(Croatia) J Kostanić (Canada) V Webb	3	6^{5}
(United States) A Cargill (Republic of Ireland) K Liggan	6	6
Q	(France) V Razzano (Croatia) S Talaja	1	3
(United States) C Morariu (Australia) N Pratt	3	0^{r}
3	(Russia) S Kuznetsova (Spain) A Sánchez Vicario	6	3
(Spain) M Marrero (Australia) A Molik	4	6	2
2	(Spain) C Martínez (Argentina) P Tarabini	6	4	6

Semifinals
1	(Zimbabwe) C Black (Spain) V Ruano Pascual	6	6
(United States) A Cargill (Republic of Ireland) K Liggan	3	3
3	(Russia) S Kuznetsova (Spain) A Sánchez Vicario	w/o
2	(Spain) C Martínez (Argentina) P Tarabini

Final
1	(Zimbabwe) C Black (Spain) V Ruano Pascual	6	6
3	(Russia) S Kuznetsova (Spain) A Sánchez Vicario	2	3
