= 2002 State Farm Women's Tennis Classic – Singles =

Tennis tournament

Singles
- 2002 State Farm Women's Tennis Classic

Final
- Champion: (United States) Serena Williams
- Runner-up: (United States) Jennifer Capriati
- Score: 6–2, 4–6, 6–4

Details
- Draw: 28
- Seeds: 8

Events
Singles	Doubles
- State Farm Women's Tennis Classic

Serena Williams won the title by defeating Jennifer Capriati 6–2, 4–6, 6–4 in the final.

== Seeds ==
The first four seeds received a bye into the second round.

1. (United States) Jennifer Capriati (final)
2. (Switzerland) Martina Hingis (semifinals)
3. (United States) Serena Williams (champion)
4. (United States) Meghann Shaughnessy (second round)
5. (United States) Lisa Raymond (first round)
6. (Austria) Barbara Schett (quarterfinals)
7. (Italy) Francesca Schiavone (quarterfinals)
8. (Czech Republic) Dája Bedáňová (quarterfinals)

== Draw ==
Key

- Q = Qualifier
- WC = Wild card
- LL = Lucky loser
- Alt = Alternate
- ITF = ITF entry
- PR = Protected ranking
- SR = Special ranking
- SE = Special exempt
- JE = Junior exempt
- JR = Junior Accelerator Programme entrant
- CO = College Accelerator Programme entrant
- NG = Next Gen Accelerator Program entrant
- w/o = Walkover
- r = Retired
- d = Defaulted

=== Finals ===
Semifinals
1	(United States) Jennifer Capriati	6	6
(France) Nathalie Dechy	2	3
3	(United States) Serena Williams	6	3	6
2	(Switzerland) Martina Hingis	1	6	4

Finals
1	(United States) Jennifer Capriati	2	6	4
3	(United States) Serena Williams	6	4	6

=== Top half ===
First round
(United States) A Stevenson	1	6	6
(United States) A Frazier	6	4	4
(Slovenia) T Pisnik	6	6
WC	(Argentina) G Dulko	2	3
Q	(Federal Republic of Yugoslavia) J Janković	3	6^{5}
6	(Austria) B Schett	6	7^{7}
(United States) J Hopkins	2	6	0
(France) N Dechy	6	4	6
(Russia) T Panova	6	6
(Spain) M Serna	1	2
(Russia) E Likhovtseva	4	3
7	(Italy) F Schiavone	6	6

Second round
1	(United States) J Capriati	6	6
(United States) A Stevenson	4	4
(Slovenia) T Pisnik	6	3	5
6	(Austria) B Schett	4	6	7
4	(United States) M Shaughnessy	5	2
(France) N Dechy	7	6
(Russia) T Panova	6^{5}	6	2
7	(Italy) F Schiavone	7^{7}	1	6

Quarterfinals
1	(United States) J Capriati	7	6
6	(Austria) B Schett	5	3
(France) N Dechy	7^{7}	6
7	(Italy) F Schiavone	6^{5}	4

Semifinals
1	(United States) J Capriati	6	6
(France) N Dechy	2	3

=== Bottom half ===
First round
5	(United States) L Raymond	6^{3}	0
(Japan) A Sugiyama	7^{7}	6
(United States) M Tu	3	2
(Australia) N Pratt	6	6
(United States) L Osterloh	2	2
Q	(Russia) A Jidkova	6	6
8	(Czech Republic) D Bedáňová	7	4	7
WC	(Russia) E Bovina	5	6	5
Q	(Croatia) S Talaja	7	6
(Italy) Ad Serra Zanetti	5	2
Q	(France) S Foretz	6	6
(Spain) M Marrero	2	1

Second round
(Japan) A Sugiyama	2	1
(Australia) N Pratt	6	6
Q	(Russia) A Jidkova	3	3
3	(United States) S Williams	6	6
8	(Czech Republic) D Bedáňová	6	6
Q	(Croatia) S Talaja	2	3
Q	(France) S Foretz	2	4
2	(Switzerland) M Hingis	6	6

Quarterfinals
(Australia) N Pratt	2	5
3	(United States) S Williams	6	7
8	(Czech Republic) D Bedáňová	4	6	3
2	(Switzerland) M Hingis	6	0	6

Semifinals
3	(United States) S Williams	6	3	6
2	(Switzerland) M Hingis	1	6	4
