= 2002 French Community Championships – Doubles =

Doubles
- 2002 French Community Championships

Final
- Champions: (Austria) Barbara Schwartz (Germany) Jasmin Wöhr
- Runners-up: (Italy) Tathiana Garbin (Spain) Arantxa Sánchez Vicario
- Score: 6–2, 0–6, 6–4

Details
- Draw: 16
- Seeds: 4

Events
Singles	Doubles
← 2001 ·	WTA Knokke-Heist

Virginia Ruano Pascual and Magüi Serna were the defending champions, but lost in the semifinals to tournament winners Barbara Schwartz and Jasmin Wöhr.

Schwartz and Wöhr won the title by defeating Tathiana Garbin and Arantxa Sánchez Vicario 6–2, 0–6, 6–4 in the final.

== Seeds ==
1. (Spain) Virginia Ruano Pascual / (Spain) Magüi Serna (semifinals)
2. (Belgium) Els Callens / (Austria) Barbara Schett (semifinals)
3. (Italy) Tathiana Garbin / (Spain) Arantxa Sánchez Vicario (final)
4. (Spain) Marta Marrero / (Belarus) Tatiana Poutchek (quarterfinals)

== Draw ==
=== Key ===
- Q = Qualifier
- WC = Wild card
- LL = Lucky loser
- Alt = Alternate
- ITF = ITF entry
- PR = Protected ranking
- SR = Special ranking
- SE = Special exempt
- JE = Junior exempt
- JR = Junior Accelerator Programme entrant
- CO = College Accelerator Programme entrant
- NG = Next Gen Accelerator Program entrant
- w/o = Walkover
- r = Retired
- d = Defaulted

=== Draw ===
First round
1	(Spain) V Ruano Pascual (Spain) M Serna	1^{30}
(France) C Dhenin (Czech Republic) E Martincová	1^{0}	r
(Germany) M Kučerová (New Zealand) S Stephens	1	6	6
(Argentina) N Gussoni (Croatia) S Talaja	6	0	3
4	(Spain) M Marrero (Belarus) T Poutchek	6	6
(Belgium) L Courtois (Belgium) C Maes	2	3
(Germany) Ad Barna (Germany) An Barna	5	7	4
(Austria) B Schwartz (Germany) J Wöhr	7	5	6
(Australia) C Barclay (France) É Loit	4	6	6
WC	(Switzerland) M Casanova (Belgium) E Clijsters	6	3	3
(Estonia) M Ani (Spain) M Ramón Climent	6	1	2
3	(Italy) T Garbin (Spain) A Sánchez Vicario	3	6	6
(Denmark) E Dyrberg (Germany) C Schneider	2	2
(Germany) M Müller (Germany) B Rittner	6	6
Q	(Spain) G León García (Spain) C Torrens Valero	4	4
2	(Belgium) E Callens (Austria) B Schett	6	6

Quarterfinals
1	(Spain) V Ruano Pascual (Spain) M Serna	6	6
(Germany) M Kučerová (New Zealand) S Stephens	4	3
4	(Spain) M Marrero (Belarus) T Poutchek	2	2
(Austria) B Schwartz (Germany) J Wöhr	6	6
(Australia) C Barclay (France) É Loit
3	(Italy) T Garbin (Spain) A Sánchez Vicario	w/o
(Germany) M Müller (Germany) B Rittner	3	3
2	(Belgium) E Callens (Austria) B Schett	6	6

Semifinals
1	(Spain) V Ruano Pascual (Spain) M Serna	4	7	2
(Austria) B Schwartz (Germany) J Wöhr	6	5	6
3	(Italy) T Garbin (Spain) A Sánchez Vicario	7^{7}	6
2	(Belgium) E Callens (Austria) B Schett	6^{4}	3

Final
(Austria) B Schwartz (Germany) J Wöhr	6	0	6
3	(Italy) T Garbin (Spain) A Sánchez Vicario	2	6	4
