= 2002 French Community Championships – Singles =

Singles
- 2002 French Community Championships

Final
- Champion: (Switzerland) Myriam Casanova
- Runner-up: (Spain) Arantxa Sánchez Vicario
- Score: 4–6, 6–2, 6–1

Details
- Draw: 32 (2WC/4Q)
- Seeds: 8

Events
Singles	Doubles
← 2001 ·	WTA Knokke-Heist

Iroda Tulyaganova was the defending champions, but did not compete this year.

Myriam Casanova won the title by defeating Arantxa Sánchez Vicario 4–6, 6–2, 6–1 in the final.

== Seeds ==
1. (Spain) Arantxa Sánchez Vicario (final)
2. (Austria) Barbara Schett (quarterfinals)
3. (Spain) Cristina Torrens Valero (first round)
4. (Slovakia) Martina Suchá (first round)
5. (Spain) Magüi Serna (quarterfinals)
6. (Spain) Virginia Ruano Pascual (semifinals)
7. (Germany) Martina Müller (quarterfinals)
8. (France) Émilie Loit (semifinals, retired due to a left shoulder injury)

== Draw ==
=== Key ===
- Q = Qualifier
- WC = Wild card
- LL = Lucky loser
- Alt = Alternate
- SE = Special exempt
- PR = Protected ranking
- ITF = ITF entry
- JE = Junior exempt
- w/o = Walkover
- r = Retired
- d = Defaulted
- SR = Special ranking

=== Finals ===
Semifinals
1	(Spain) Arantxa Sánchez Vicario	6
8	(France) Émilie Loit	4	r
WC	(Switzerland) Myriam Casanova	6	3	6
6	(Spain) Virginia Ruano Pascual	2	6	2

Final
1	(Spain) Arantxa Sánchez Vicario	6	2	1
WC	(Switzerland) Myriam Casanova	4	6	6

=== Top half ===
First round
1	(Spain) A Sánchez Vicario	6	3	6
(Czech Republic) D Chládková	3	6	0
(Spain) G León García	6	2	6
(Germany) B Rittner	2	6	4
(Netherlands) K Boogert	7	6
Q	(Spain) M Ramón Climent	5	3
(Italy) T Garbin	4	6	4
5	(Spain) M Serna	6	3	6
4	(Slovakia) M Suchá	4	6	4
(Austria) B Schwartz	6	0	6
Q	(Germany) S Klaschka	2	2
(Denmark) E Dyrberg	6	6
(France) V Razzano	5	7^{7}	2
(Estonia) M Ani	7	6^{5}	6
(Estonia) K Kanepi	3	0
8	(France) É Loit	6	6

Second round
1	(Spain) A Sánchez Vicario	6	6
(Spain) G León García	2	3
(Netherlands) K Boogert	3	3
5	(Spain) M Serna	6	6
(Austria) B Schwartz	7	6
(Denmark) E Dyrberg	5	4
(Estonia) M Ani	3	2
8	(France) É Loit	6	6

Quarterfinals
1	(Spain) A Sánchez Vicario	3	6	6
5	(Spain) M Serna	6	2	2
(Austria) B Schwartz	6	5	3
8	(France) É Loit	4	7	6

Semifinals
1	(Spain) A Sánchez Vicario	6
8	(France) É Loit	4	r

=== Bottom half ===
First round
7	(Germany) M Müller	6	6
WC	(Belgium) E Clijsters	4	2
(Belgium) E Callens	6	6
(Spain) M Marrero	1	2
(Germany) A Barna	6	2	7^{9}
Q	(Sweden) S Arvidsson	2	6	6^{7}
WC	(Switzerland) M Casanova	7^{7}	6
3	(Spain) C Torrens Valero	6^{5}	2
6	(Spain) V Ruano Pascual	5	7	6
(Belgium) D van de Zande	7	5	2
(Hungary) A Kapros	5	1
(Croatia) S Talaja	7	6
(Czech Republic) L Průšová	6	6
(Belarus) T Poutchek	3	1
Q	(Czech Republic) J Hlaváčková	3	4
2	(Austria) B Schett	6	6

Second round
7	(Germany) M Müller	6	3	6
(Belgium) E Callens	4	6	2
(Germany) A Barna	4	4
WC	(Switzerland) M Casanova	6	6
6	(Spain) V Ruano Pascual	6	6
(Croatia) S Talaja	2	1
(Czech Republic) L Průšová	4	0
2	(Austria) B Schett	6	6

Quarterfinals
7	(Germany) M Müller	4	5
WC	(Switzerland) M Casanova	6	7
6	(Spain) V Ruano Pascual	6	3	6
2	(Austria) B Schett	4	6	1

Semifinals
WC	(Switzerland) M Casanova	6	3	6
6	(Spain) V Ruano Pascual	2	6	2
