= 2002 State Farm Women's Tennis Classic – Doubles =

Tennis tournament

Doubles
- 2002 State Farm Women's Tennis Classic

Final
- Champions: (United States) Lisa Raymond (Australia) Rennae Stubbs
- Runners-up: (Zimbabwe) Cara Black (Russia) Elena Likhovtseva
- Score: 6–3, 5–7, 7–6^{(7–4)}

Details
- Draw: 16
- Seeds: 4

Events
Singles	Doubles
- State Farm Women's Tennis Classic

Lisa Raymond and Rennae Stubbs were the defending champions and successfully defended their title, by defeating Cara Black and Elena Likhovtseva 6–3, 5–7, 7–6^{(7–4)} in the final.

== Seeds ==
1. (United States) Lisa Raymond / (Australia) Rennae Stubbs (champions)
2. (Zimbabwe) Cara Black / (Russia) Elena Likhovtseva (final)
3. (United States) Kimberly Po-Messerli / (Australia) Nicole Pratt (semifinals)
4. (Netherlands) Miriam Oremans / (Japan) Ai Sugiyama (semifinals)

== Draw ==
Key

- Q = Qualifier
- WC = Wild card
- LL = Lucky loser
- Alt = Alternate
- ITF = ITF entry
- PR = Protected ranking
- SR = Special ranking
- SE = Special exempt
- JE = Junior exempt
- JR = Junior Accelerator Programme entrant
- CO = College Accelerator Programme entrant
- NG = Next Gen Accelerator Program entrant
- w/o = Walkover
- r = Retired
- d = Defaulted

=== Draw ===
First round
1	(United States) L Raymond (Australia) R Stubbs	6	6^{7}	7
(Czech Republic) D Bedáňová (Russia) E Bovina	4	7^{9}	5
(South Africa) N de Villiers (Kazakhstan) I Selyutina	4	6	4
(Chinese Taipei) J Lee (Indonesia) W Prakusya	6	3	6
3	(United States) K Po-Messerli (Australia) N Pratt	6	6
(United States) E deLone (United States) S Reeves	2	1
WC	(Russia) A Jidkova (United States) L Osterloh	5	5
(Slovenia) T Pisnik (United States) K Schlukebir	7	7
Q	(United States) M Irvin (United States) A Stevenson	4	3
(France) N Dechy (United States) M Tu	6	6
(United States) A Frazier (Italy) F Schiavone	6	4	1
4	(Netherlands) M Oremans (Japan) A Sugiyama	3	6	6
(Austria) B Schett (Spain) M Serna	4	2
(Spain) M Marrero (Spain) MJ Martínez Sánchez	6	6
(South Africa) K Grant (Australia) R McQuillan	2	5
2	(Zimbabwe) C Black (Russia) E Likhovtseva	6	7

Quarterfinals
1	(United States) L Raymond (Australia) R Stubbs	6	6
(Chinese Taipei) J Lee (Indonesia) W Prakusya	0	3
3	(United States) K Po-Messerli (Australia) N Pratt	7^{7}	6
(Slovenia) T Pisnik (United States) K Schlukebir	6^{3}	1
(France) N Dechy (United States) M Tu	6	2	4
4	(Netherlands) M Oremans (Japan) A Sugiyama	2	6	6
(Spain) M Marrero (Spain) MJ Martínez Sánchez	3	6^{4}
2	(Zimbabwe) C Black (Russia) E Likhovtseva	6	7^{7}

Semifinals
1	(United States) L Raymond (Australia) R Stubbs	6	6
3	(United States) K Po-Messerli (Australia) N Pratt	3	3
4	(Netherlands) M Oremans (Japan) A Sugiyama	4	6^{1}
2	(Zimbabwe) C Black (Russia) E Likhovtseva	6	7^{7}

Final
1	(United States) L Raymond (Australia) R Stubbs	6	5	7^{7}
2	(Zimbabwe) C Black (Russia) E Likhovtseva	3	7	6^{4}
