= Sarah Taylor (tennis) =

American tennis player and coach

- Country (sports): United States
- Residence: Bradenton, Florida, U.S.
- Born: November 6, 1981 (age 44) New York City, U.S.
- Height: 1.75 m (5 ft 9 in)
- Turned pro: 2001
- Retired: 2005
- Plays: Right-handed (two-handed backhand)
- Prize money: $294,946

Singles
- Career record: 177–153
- Career titles: 0 WTA, 6 ITF
- Highest ranking: No. 68 March 31, 2003

Grand Slam singles results
- Australian Open: 1R (2003)
- French Open: 1R (2003)
- US Open: 2R (2001)

Doubles
- Career record: 33–48
- Career titles: 0
- Highest ranking: No. 179 July 9, 2001
Medal record
Women's Tennis
Pan American Games
Silver medal – second place	2003 Santo Domingo	Singles

Sarah Taylor (born November 6, 1981) is a tennis coach and former professional American tennis player from New York City. Her highest ranking was World No. 68 on March 31, 2003.

Taylor made her debut in a Grand Slam tournament at the 2001 US Open where she beat World No. 41 Marlene Weingärtner in the first round.

She won the silver medal at the 2003 Pan American Games, losing the final to Milagros Sequera 7–5, 4–6, 6–1.

== Family background ==
Sarah's mother, Sally, is a paralegal who was a nationally ranked junior player (No. 6 in girls 14s, No. 1 in doubles). She has two older brothers, Jeff, who played college tennis at the University of California at Berkeley, Vanderbilt University, and professional tennis on the ITF Men's professional Circuit, and Robert, who played at the University of Colorado. She moved from Raleigh, North Carolina to Bradenton, Florida in 1994 to attend the Nick Bollettieri Tennis Academy.

== Results ==
=== 2002 ===
In addition to a 1998 title, captured an ITF Circuit singles title three years consecutively, most recently at ITF/Fullerton-USA, by passing top seed Irvin in QF; at Nasdaq in Miami, as world No. 118, received WC spot but was forced to ret. 1r against fellow WC Gisela Dulko at 1–4 due to a stomach virus; qualified for Strasbourg and won 1r over Pullin before falling to No. 2 seed and eventual champion Silvia Farina Elia; top seeded, won fifth title on ITF Circuit and second of year at ITF/College Park-USA; as Canadian Open qualifier, d. WC Nejedly before falling to former world No. 1 Jennifer Capriati; ranking moved up to No. 102; received a WC into second US Open, falling to qualifier Fabiola Zuluaga 1r; at Hawaii, ret. in 2r with a left foot sprain; career-first SF appearance came in Bali (as a qualifier), d. No. 5 seed Ad. Serra Zanetti, Morariu and Marrero before falling to former world No. 2 Conchita Martínez; cracked Top 100 at No. 87; at Tokyo (Japan Open), reached second SF in as many weeks with an upset of former world No. 1 Sanchez-Vicario in 2r; ranking reached No. 77

=== 2003 ===
In 2003, she made her debut at the Australian Open, her first Grand Slam event outside of the United States, losing in the first round to No. 16 seed Nathalie Dechy). She reached the fourth round at the Nasdaq-100 Open in Miami as a wildcard, upsetting No. 11 seed Anastasia Myskina in her opening match, following a bye in the first round, and No. 17 seed Ai Sugiyama, losing to former world No. 1 Jennifer Capriati, the No. 6 seed; following Miami, her ranking rose from No. 85 to No. 68. She retired in the first round at Madrid vs. No. 5 seed Paola Suárez with the score 6–2, 3–0 to Suarez due to a right wrist sprain (a recurring injury); Her Roland Garros debut ended with a first round loss to qualifier Sandra Kleinová. She then lost in the first round at the US Open to No. 12 seed Conchita Martínez, thus failing to win a Grand Slam match during her 2003 season. At Quebec City, after she had lost to Gisela Dulko in the first round of the singles, she was forced to retire in the first round of the doubles, partnering Allison Baker, due to a sprained right ankle.

=== 2005 ===
She won her sixth career pro singles title at $10K ITF/Evansville, IN-USA, defeating Kristi Miller in the final in straight sets 7–6, 6–1.

== Post-retirement ==
After retiring in 2005, Taylor attended the University of North Carolina while working at the Hollow Rock Racquet Club in Durham, North Carolina. In October 2009, she became a coach at the United States Tennis Association. She then received her PhD in Experimental Psychology from Ohio University in 2017, and was an Assistant Professor of Psychology at Ohio Wesleyan University from 2018-2021. In 2021 she accepted a position at Lake Forest Academy, where she currently is the Science Department Chair and teaches AP Psychology.
