= 1999 Nokia Cup – Singles =

Singles
- 1999 Nokia Cup

Final
- Champion: (Slovakia) Henrieta Nagyová
- Runner-up: (Italy) Silvia Farina
- Score: 7–6^{(7–2)}, 6–4

Details
- Draw: 32
- Seeds: 8

Events
Singles	Doubles
- Nokia Cup

The 1999 Nokia Cup was a WTA Tier IV tournament held in Prostějov, Czech Republic, and the only edition of the Nokia Cup. Slovak Henrieta Nagyová won in the final 7–6^{(7–2)}, 6–4 against Silvia Farina.

== Seeds ==
1. (France) Nathalie Tauziat (first round)
2. (Belgium) Dominique Van Roost (second round, retired)
3. (Italy) Silvia Farina (final)
4. (Slovakia) Henrieta Nagyová (champion)
5. (France) Alexandra Fusai (second round)
6. (Spain) María Sánchez Lorenzo (first round)
7. (Romania) Ruxandra Dragomir (second round)
8. (France) Nathalie Dechy (quarterfinals)

== Draw ==
Key

- Q = Qualifier
- WC = Wild card
- LL = Lucky loser
- Alt = Alternate
- ITF = ITF entry
- PR = Protected ranking
- SR = Special ranking
- SE = Special exempt
- JE = Junior exempt
- JR = Junior Accelerator Programme entrant
- CO = College Accelerator Programme entrant
- NG = Next Gen Accelerator Program entrant
- w/o = Walkover
- r = Retired
- d = Defaulted

=== Finals ===
Semifinals
(France) Alexia Dechaume-Balleret	3	3
3	(Italy) Silvia Farina	6	6
4	(Slovakia) Henrieta Nagyová	6	6
Q	(Netherlands) Amanda Hopmans	3	3

Final
3	(Italy) Silvia Farina	6^{2}	4
4	(Slovakia) Henrieta Nagyová	7^{7}	6

=== Top half ===
First round
1	(France) N Tauziat	0	6^{5}
(France) A Cocheteux	6	7^{7}
LL	(Slovakia) K Studeníková	6	6
(Czech Republic) A Gerši	4	3
(France) A Dechaume-Balleret	6	4	6
(Romania) C Cristea	3	6	3
(Belarus) O Barabanschikova	6	3	3
5	(France) A Fusai	4	6	6
3	(Italy) S Farina	6	6
(Sweden) Å Carlsson	2	3
(Germany) E Wagner	2	0
Q	(Czech Republic) D Chládková	6	6
(Italy) L Golarsa	4	6	6
(France) A-G Sidot	6	4	2
WC	(Czech Republic) M Paštiková	1	3
8	(France) N Dechy	6	6

Second round
(France) A Cocheteux	w/o
LL	(Slovakia) K Studeníková
(France) A Dechaume-Balleret	7	7
5	(France) A Fusai	5	5
3	(Italy) S Farina	6	6
Q	(Czech Republic) D Chládková	2	2
(Italy) L Golarsa	1	3
8	(France) N Dechy	6	6

Quarterfinals
(France) A Cocheteux	2	3
(France) A Dechaume-Balleret	6	6
3	(Italy) S Farina	6	6
8	(France) N Dechy	4	1

Semifinals
(France) A Dechaume-Balleret	3	3
3	(Italy) S Farina	6	6

=== Bottom half ===
First round
6	(Spain) M Sánchez Lorenzo	0	5
WC	(Czech Republic) L Němečková	6	7
(Germany) B Rittner	7^{7}	5	6
(Slovakia) K Habšudová	6^{1}	7	3
(Germany) M Weingärtner	7	4	3
(United States) M Shaughnessy	5	6	6
(Canada) J Nejedly	2	7^{7}	3
4	(Slovakia) H Nagyová	6	6^{3}	6
7	(Romania) R Dragomir	6	3	6
(Czech Republic) K Hrdličková	3	6	4
(Germany) J Kandarr	4	3
Q	(Germany) J Abe	6	6
(Romania) R Sandu	6	3	2
Q	(Netherlands) A Hopmans	4	6	6
Q	(Germany) A Barna	4	5
2	(Belgium) D Van Roost	6	7

Second round
WC	(Czech Republic) L Němečková	5	6	6
(Germany) B Rittner	7	1	4
(United States) M Shaughnessy	3	4
4	(Slovakia) H Nagyová	6	6
7	(Romania) R Dragomir	4	4
Q	(Germany) J Abe	6	6
Q	(Netherlands) A Hopmans	6	2	5
2	(Belgium) D Van Roost	4	6	2^{r}

Quarterfinals
WC	(Czech Republic) L Němečková	5	2
4	(Slovakia) H Nagyová	7	6
Q	(Germany) J Abe	4	6	4
Q	(Netherlands) A Hopmans	6	4	6

Semifinals
4	(Slovakia) H Nagyová	6	6
Q	(Netherlands) A Hopmans	3	3

== Qualifying ==
=== Seeds ===
1. (Slovakia) Katarína Studeníková (qualifying competition, lucky loser)
2. (Russia) Eugenia Kulikovskaya (first round)
3. (Austria) Barbara Schwartz (first round)
4. (Poland) Aleksandra Olsza (second round)
5. (Germany) Miriam Schnitzer (first round)
6. (Austria) Patricia Wartusch (second round)
7. (Netherlands) Amanda Hopmans (qualifier)
8. (Federal Republic of Yugoslavia) Sandra Naćuk (first round)

=== Qualifiers ===
1. (Netherlands) Amanda Hopmans
2. (Germany) Julia Abe
3. (Czech Republic) Denisa Chládková
4. (Germany) Anca Barna

=== Lucky loser ===
1. (Slovakia) Katarína Studeníková

== Qualifying draw ==
Key

- Q = Qualifier
- WC = Wild card
- LL = Lucky loser
- Alt = Alternate
- ITF = ITF entry
- PR = Protected ranking
- SR = Special ranking
- SE = Special exempt
- JE = Junior exempt
- JR = Junior Accelerator Programme entrant
- CO = College Accelerator Programme entrant
- NG = Next Gen Accelerator Program entrant
- w/o = Walkover
- r = Retired
- d = Defaulted

=== First qualifier ===
First round
1	(Slovakia) Katarína Studeníková	6	6
WC	(Czech Republic) Libuše Průšová	3	0
(United Kingdom) Joanne Ward	4	5
(Germany) Syna Schmidle	6	7
(Austria) Karin Kschwendt	7^{9}	7
(Slovakia) Martina Suchá	6^{7}	5
(Germany) Sandra Klösel	6^{1}	5
7	(Netherlands) Amanda Hopmans	7^{7}	7

Second round
1	(Slovakia) Katarína Studeníková	6	6
(Germany) Syna Schmidle	2	3
(Austria) Karin Kschwendt	2	1
7	(Netherlands) Amanda Hopmans	6	6

Qualifying competition
1	(Slovakia) Katarína Studeníková	6	2	6
7	(Netherlands) Amanda Hopmans	3	6	1

=== Second qualifier ===
First round
4	(Poland) Aleksandra Olsza	6	3	7
WC	(Czech Republic) Veronika Raimrová	4	6	5
(Austria) Marion Maruska	2	4
(Germany) Julia Abe	6	6
(Slovakia) Janette Husárová	2	6	6
(Czech Republic) Zuzana Ondrášková	6	2	1
WC	(Czech Republic) Veronika Čtvrtníčková	1	3
6	(Austria) Patricia Wartusch	6	6

Second round
4	(Poland) Aleksandra Olsza	5	5
(Germany) Julia Abe	7	7
(Slovakia) Janette Husárová	7^{7}	6
6	(Austria) Patricia Wartusch	6^{1}	2

Qualifying competition
(Germany) Julia Abe	6	7
(Slovakia) Janette Husárová	1	5

=== Third qualifier ===
First round
8	(Federal Republic of Yugoslavia) Sandra Naćuk	3	6	3
(United States) Linda Wild	6	4	6
WC	(Czech Republic) Dája Bedáňová	3	6	6
(Czech Republic) Alena Vašková	6	2	3
(United Kingdom) Julie Pullin	0	3
(Czech Republic) Sandra Kleinová	6	6
(Czech Republic) Denisa Chládková	6	6
3	(Austria) Barbara Schwartz	4	4

Second round
(United States) Linda Wild	6	4	1
WC	(Czech Republic) Dája Bedáňová	4	6	6
(Czech Republic) Sandra Kleinová	1	1
(Czech Republic) Denisa Chládková	6	6

Qualifying competition
WC	(Czech Republic) Dája Bedáňová	4	7	6^{5}
(Czech Republic) Denisa Chládková	6	5	7^{7}

=== Fourth qualifier ===
First round
5	(Germany) Miriam Schnitzer	1	6	3
(Austria) Sybille Bammer	6	1	6
(Germany) Anca Barna	6	6
(Austria) Sandra Dopfer	2	3
(Belgium) Laurence Courtois	7^{7}	5	4
(Hungary) Petra Mandula	6^{5}	7	6
(Russia) Elena Dementieva	6	6
2	(Russia) Eugenia Kulikovskaya	1	2

Second round
(Austria) Sybille Bammer	6^{4}	4
(Germany) Anca Barna	7^{7}	6
(Hungary) Petra Mandula	2	6	4
(Russia) Elena Dementieva	6	4	6

Qualifying competition
(Germany) Anca Barna	6	4	6
(Russia) Elena Dementieva	4	6	4
