= 1997 ASB Classic – Singles =

Singles
- 1997 ASB Classic
- 1996 Champion: (United States) Sandra Cacic

Final
- Champion: (Austria) Marion Maruska
- Runner-up: (Austria) Judith Wiesner
- Score: 6–3, 6–1.

Details
- Draw: 32
- Seeds: 8

Events
Singles	Doubles
← 1996 ·	WTA Auckland Open	· 1998 →

Sandra Cacic was the defending champion but lost in the quarterfinals to Tamarine Tanasugarn.

Marion Maruska won in the final 6–3, 6–1 against Judith Wiesner.

== Seeds ==
A champion seed is indicated in bold text while text in italics indicates the round in which that seed was eliminated.

1. (Germany) Anke Huber (quarterfinals)
2. (Austria) Judith Wiesner (final)
3. (United States) Linda Wild (second round)
4. (Austria) Barbara Schett (first round)
5. (Argentina) Florencia Labat (second round)
6. (Belgium) Dominique Van Roost (first round)
7. (Austria) Karin Kschwendt (first round)
8. (France) Alexandra Fusai (first round)

== Draw ==
=== Key ===
- Q = Qualifier
- WC = Wild card
- LL = Lucky loser
- Alt = Alternate
- ITF = ITF entry
- PR = Protected ranking
- SR = Special ranking
- SE = Special exempt
- JE = Junior exempt
- JR = Junior Accelerator Programme entrant
- CO = College Accelerator Programme entrant
- NG = Next Gen Accelerator Program entrant
- w/o = Walkover
- r = Retired
- d = Defaulted

First round
1	(Germany) **A Huber**	**6**	**6**
(Italy) F Lubiani	3	3
(United States) **A Grossman**	**7**	4	**2**
(Belgium) S Devillé	5	**6**	1/r
Q	(Austria) **M Maruska**	**6**	**6**
WC	(New Zealand) R Hudson	0	2
(Spain) G León García	4	4
5	(Argentina) **F Labat**	**6**	**6**
3	(United States) **L Wild**	2	**6**	**6**
(Madagascar) D Randriantefy	**6**	4	3
(Argentina) I Gorrochategui	3	5
(United States) **S Cacic**	**6**	**7**
Q	(Italy) **L Golarsa**	**6**	**7**
(United States) L Lee	1	6
(Thailand) **T Tanasugarn**	**6**	**6**
8	(France) A Fusai	2	2
6	(Belgium) D Van Roost	3	**6**	2
Q	(Japan) **R Hiraki**	**6**	0	**6**
(Slovakia) **J Husárová**	**6**	**6**
(Spain) C Torrens Valero	2	2
(Germany) **E Wagner**	**6**	2	**6**
Q	(Japan) Y Yoshida	1	**6**	4
WC	(Germany) **M Weingärtner**	**6**	**6**
4	(Austria) B Schett	0	4
7	(Austria) K Kschwendt	6	5
(France) **A D-Balleret**	**7**	**7**
(Canada) **P Hy-Boulais**	5	**7**	**7**
(United States) J Watanabe	**7**	5	5
(Poland) A Olsza	2	2
(France) **S Pitkowski**	**6**	**6**
(United States) G Helgeson-Nielsen	1	3
2	(Austria) **J Wiesner**	**6**	**6**

Second round
1	(Germany) **A Huber**	**6**	**6**
(United States) A Grossman	4	2
Q	(Austria) **M Maruska**	6	**6**	**6**
5	(Argentina) F Labat	**7**	0	3
3	(United States) L Wild	4	5
(United States) **S Cacic**	**6**	**7**
Q	(Italy) L Golarsa	2	3
(Thailand) **T Tanasugarn**	**6**	**6**
Q	(Japan) **R Hiraki**	2	**6**	**6**
(Slovakia) J Husárová	**6**	1	4
(Germany) **E Wagner**	**6**	**6**
WC	(Germany) M Weingärtner	2	2
(France) **A D-Balleret**	**6**	**6**
(Canada) P Hy-Boulais	1	1
(France) S Pitkowski	2	1
2	(Austria) **J Wiesner**	**6**	**6**

Quarterfinals
1	(Germany) A Huber	4	**6**	2
Q	(Austria) **M Maruska**	**6**	2	**6**
(United States) S Cacic	**6**	4	4
(Thailand) **T Tanasugarn**	3	**6**	**6**
Q	(Japan) R Hiraki	3	**6**	4
(Germany) **E Wagner**	**6**	0	**6**
(France) A D-Balleret	4	6
2	(Austria) **J Wiesner**	**6**	**7**

Semifinals
Q	(Austria) **M Maruska**	3	**6**	**6**
(Thailand) T Tanasugarn	**6**	3	3
(Germany) E Wagner	2	1
2	(Austria) **J Wiesner**	**6**	**6**

Final
Q	(Austria) **Marion Maruska**	**6**	**6**
2	(Austria) Judith Wiesner	3	1
