= 2001 ASB Classic – Singles =

Singles
- 2001 ASB Classic
- 2000 Champion: (Luxembourg) Anne Kremer

Final
- Champion: (United States) Meilen Tu
- Runner-up: (Argentina) Paola Suárez
- Score: 7–6^{(12–10)}, 6–2

Details
- Draw: 32
- Seeds: 8

Events
Singles	Doubles
← 2000 ·	WTA Auckland Open	· 2002 →

Anne Kremer was the defending champion but lost in the quarterfinals to Marlene Weingärtner.

Meilen Tu won in the final 7–6 (12–10), 6–2 against Paola Suárez.

== Seeds ==
A champion seed is indicated in bold text while text in italics indicates the round in which that seed was eliminated.

1. (France) Sandrine Testud (first round)
2. (Austria) Barbara Schett (second round)
3. (France) Nathalie Dechy (first round)
4. (United States) Kristina Brandi (first round)
5. (Luxembourg) Anne Kremer (quarterfinals)
6. (Argentina) Paola Suárez (final)
7. (Zimbabwe) Cara Black (quarterfinals)
8. (United States) Lilia Osterloh (quarterfinals)

== Draw ==
=== Key ===
- Q = Qualifier
- WC = Wild card
- LL = Lucky loser
- Alt = Alternate
- SE = Special exempt
- PR = Protected ranking
- ITF = ITF entry
- JE = Junior exempt
- w/o = Walkover
- r = Retired
- d = Defaulted
- SR = Special ranking

First round
1	(France) S Testud	1	5
Q	(United States) **J Craybas**	**6**	**7**
(Italy) **F Schiavone**	2	**6**	**6**
(Italy) R Grande	**6**	3	2
(France) É Loit	**7^{7}**	4	1
(Japan) **S Asagoe**	6^{4}	**6**	**6**
(United States) H Parkinson	**6**	5	4
7	(Zimbabwe) **C Black**	4	**7**	**6**
4	(United States) K Brandi	**7**	4	1
(United States) **M Tu**	5	**6**	**6**
WC	(Argentina) **M E Salerni**	**6**	**6**
(France) S Pitkowski	4	4
(Spain) C Torrens Valero	**6**	4	2
(Netherlands) **A Hopmans**	3	**6**	**6**
Q	(Slovakia) L Dlhopolcová	5	2
8	(United States) **L Osterloh**	**7**	**6**
5	(Luxembourg) **A Kremer**	**6**	**6**
(Switzerland) E Gagliardi	2	0
(United States) J Hopkins	2	**6**	2
(United States) **C Morariu**	**6**	3	**6**
(Israel) **A Smashnova**	4	**6**	**7**
(Switzerland) M Vavrinec	**6**	2	5
(Germany) **M Weingärtner**	**7^{7}**	4	**6**
3	(France) N Dechy	6^{5}	**6**	0
6	(Argentina) **P Suárez**	**6**	6^{3}	**6**
(Canada) J Nejedly	1	**7^{7}**	3
Q	(France) A Fusai	2	1
(Bulgaria) **P Nola**	**6**	**6**
Q	(United States) **A Bradshaw**	**6**	2	**6**
(Netherlands) Y Basting	4	**6**	4
WC	(New Zealand) L Baker	1	4
2	(Austria) **B Schett**	**6**	**6**

Second round
Q	(United States) J Craybas	5	3
(Italy) **F Schiavone**	**7**	**6**
(Japan) S Asagoe	1	2
7	(Zimbabwe) **C Black**	**6**	**6**
(United States) **M Tu**	**6**	**6**
WC	(Argentina) M E Salerni	2	4
(Netherlands) A Hopmans	2	3
8	(United States) **L Osterloh**	**6**	**6**
5	(Luxembourg) **A Kremer**	1	**7^{8}**	**6**
(United States) C Morariu	**6**	6^{6}	2
(Israel) A Smashnova	2	3
(Germany) **M Weingärtner**	**6**	**6**
6	(Argentina) **P Suárez**	**6**	**6**
(Bulgaria) P Nola	2	0
Q	(United States) **A Bradshaw**	**7^{7}**	3	**6**
2	(Austria) B Schett	6^{1}	**6**	4

Quarterfinals
(Italy) **F Schiavone**	**7^{7}**	**6**
7	(Zimbabwe) C Black	6^{5}	4
(United States) **M Tu**	2	**7^{7}**	**6**
8	(United States) L Osterloh	**6**	6^{1}	4
5	(Luxembourg) A Kremer	1	4
(Germany) **M Weingärtner**	**6**	**6**
6	(Argentina) **P Suárez**	**6**	**6**
Q	(United States) A Bradshaw	3	4

Semifinals
(Italy) F Schiavone	6^{6}	5
(United States) **M Tu**	**7^{8}**	**7**
(Germany) M Weingärtner	5	1
6	(Argentina) **P Suárez**	**7**	**6**

Final
(United States) **Meilen Tu**	**7^{12}**	**6**
6	(Argentina) Paola Suárez	6^{10}	2

== Qualifying ==
=== Seeds ===
The top three seeds received a bye to the second round.

1. (United Kingdom) Louise Latimer (second round)
2. (Argentina) Mariana Díaz Oliva (final round)
3. (Slovenia) Katarina Srebotnik (final round)
4. (Japan) Yuka Yoshida (final round)
5. (United States) **Allison Bradshaw (Qualifier)**
6. (Venezuela) Milagros Sequera (second round)
7. (France) **Alexandra Fusai (Qualifier)**
8. (United States) **Jill Craybas (Qualifier)**

=== Qualifiers ===
1. **(Czech Republic) Lenka Dlhopolcová**
2. **(United States) Jill Craybas**
3. **(France) Alexandra Fusai**
4. **(United States) Allison Bradshaw**

=== Draw ===
==== First qualifier ====
First round
(New Zealand) Ilke Gers	**6**	2	0
(Japan) **Rika Fujiwara**	3	**6**	**6**
(Slovakia) **Lenka Dlhopolcova**	**6**	**6**
(Slovenia) Tina Križan	1	2
WC	(New Zealand) Tracey O'Connor	5	4
6	(Venezuela) **Milagros Sequera**	**7**	**6**

Second round
1	(United Kingdom) Louise Latimer	4	2
(Japan) **Rika Fujiwara**	**6**	**6**
(Slovakia) **Lenka Dlhopolcova**	**6**	**6**
6	(Venezuela) Milagros Sequera	4	1

Final Round
(Japan) Rika Fujiwara	**6**	3	4
(Slovakia) **Lenka Dlhopolcova**	4	**6**	**6**

==== Second qualifier ====
First round
(Germany) **Angelika Bachmann**	**6**	**6**
(United Kingdom) Lucie Ahl	4	1
(Germany) **Vanessa Henke**	**6**	**6**
(Austria) Marion Maruska	2	4
(New Zealand) Rachel Dive	0	2
8	(United States) **Jill Craybas**	**6**	**6**

Second round
2	(Argentina) **Mariana Díaz Oliva**	**6**	**6**
(Germany) Angelika Bachmann	1	0
(Germany) Vanessa Henke	2	2
8	(United States) **Jill Craybas**	**6**	**6**

Final Round
2	(Argentina) Mariana Díaz Oliva	4	1
8	(United States) **Jill Craybas**	**6**	**6**

==== Third qualifier ====
First round
(United States) Sarah Taylor	**6**	4	5
(South Africa) **Liezel Horn**	4	**6**	**7**
(Germany) Caroline Schneider	4	1
(Tunisia) **Selima Sfar**	**6**	**6**
(Croatia) Antonia Matic	4	1
7	(France) **Alexandra Fusai**	**6**	**6**

Second round
3	(Slovenia) **Katarina Srebotnik**	**6**	2	**6**
(South Africa) Liezel Horn	2	**6**	1
(Tunisia) Selima Sfar	2	4
7	(France) **Alexandra Fusai**	**6**	**6**

Final Round
3	(Slovenia) Katarina Srebotnik	5	3
7	(France) **Alexandra Fusai**	**7**	**6**

==== Fourth qualifier ====
First round
4	(Japan) **Yuka Yoshida**	**6**	**6**
(New Zealand) Shelley Stephens	3	4
(New Zealand) Tanja Markovic	0	0
(France) **Stéphanie Foretz**	**6**	**6**
(Australia) Amy Jensen	5	3
(United States) **Amanda Augustus**	**7**	**6**
(South Africa) Kim Grant	4	1
5	(United States) **Allison Bradshaw**	**6**	**6**

Second round
4	(Japan) **Yuka Yoshida**	**6**	**6**
(France) Stéphanie Foretz	3	3
(United States) Amanda Augustus	1	0
5	(United States) **Allison Bradshaw**	**6**	**6**

Final Round
4	(Japan) Yuka Yoshida	4	4
5	(United States) **Allison Bradshaw**	**6**	**6**
