= 1999 ASB Classic – Singles =

Singles
- 1999 ASB Classic

Final
- Champion: (France) Julie Halard-Decugis
- Runner-up: (Belgium) Dominique Van Roost
- Score: 6–4, 6–1

Details
- Draw: 32
- Seeds: 8

Events
Singles	Doubles
← 1998 ·	WTA Auckland Open	· 2000 →

The 1999 ASB Classic singles was the singles event of the fourteenth edition of the ASB Classic; a WTA Tier IV tournament and the most prestigious women's tennis tournament held in New Zealand. Dominique Van Roost was the defending champion but lost in the final 6–4, 6–1 against Julie Halard-Decugis.

== Seeds ==
1. (Belgium) Dominique Van Roost (final)
2. (Italy) Silvia Farina (semifinals)
3. (France) Julie Halard-Decugis (champion)
4. (Austria) Barbara Schett (semifinals)
5. (United States) Lisa Raymond (quarterfinals)
6. (United States) Tara Snyder (second round)
7. (United States) Chanda Rubin (quarterfinals)
8. (Venezuela) María Vento (second round)

== Draw ==
=== Key ===
- Q = Qualifier
- WC = Wild card
- LL = Lucky loser
- Alt = Alternate
- SE = Special exempt
- PR = Protected ranking
- ITF = ITF entry
- JE = Junior exempt
- w/o = Walkover
- r = Retired
- d = Defaulted
- SR = Special ranking

=== Finals ===
Semifinals
1	(Belgium) Dominique Van Roost	3	6	6
4	(Austria) Barbara Schett	6	1	0
3	(France) Julie Halard-Decugis	7^{7}	6
2	(Italy) Silvia Farina	6^{5}	1

Final
1	(Belgium) Dominique Van Roost	4	1
3	(France) Julie Halard-Decugis	6	6

=== Top half ===
First round
1	(Belgium) D Van Roost	7	6
(Italy) R Grande	5	0
(Netherlands) M Oremans	3	4
WC	(New Zealand) L Baker	6	6
Q	(France) É Loit	1	2
(Puerto Rico) K Brandi	6	6
(Germany) M Weingärtner	7	0	0
8	(Venezuela) M Vento	5	6	6
4	(Austria) B Schett	6	6
(Germany) E Wagner	1	0
Q	(Kazakhstan) I Selyutina	6^{4}	3
(United States) S Cacic	7^{7}	6
Q	(Japan) M Saeki	6	6
(Romania) C Cristea	2	1
(France) A Dechaume-Balleret	6	5	4
5	(United States) L Raymond	4	7	6

Second round
1	(Belgium) D Van Roost	6	6
WC	(New Zealand) L Baker	2	2
(Puerto Rico) K Brandi	4	6	6
8	(Venezuela) M Vento	6	3	4
4	(Austria) B Schett	6	6
(United States) S Cacic	4	2
Q	(Japan) M Saeki	4	6	4
5	(United States) L Raymond	6	3	6

Quarterfinals
1	(Belgium) D Van Roost	6	6
(Puerto Rico) K Brandi	4	0
4	(Austria) B Schett	6	6
5	(United States) L Raymond	1	1

Semifinals
1	(Belgium) D Van Roost	3	6	6
4	(Austria) B Schett	6	1	0

=== Bottom half ===
First round
6	(United States) T Snyder	6	6^{1}	6
Q	(United States) M Tu	4	7^{7}	1
(Spain) M Sánchez Lorenzo	3	6	6
(Luxembourg) A Kremer	6	3	4
(Argentina) F Labat	6	6
WC	(New Zealand) R Hudson	3	2
(Canada) J Nejedly	3	3
3	(France) J Halard-Decugis	6	6
7	(United States) C Rubin	7^{7}	3	6
(United States) MJ Fernández	6^{1}	6	2
(United Kingdom) S Smith	3	6^{2}
(Netherlands) K Boogert	6	7^{7}
(United States) M Shaughnessy	6	6
(Italy) L Golarsa	1	4
(Germany) A Glass	4	5
2	(Italy) S Farina	6	7

Second round
6	(United States) T Snyder	0	4
(Spain) M Sánchez Lorenzo	6	6
(Argentina) F Labat	0	2
3	(France) J Halard-Decugis	6	6
7	(United States) C Rubin	6	7
(Netherlands) K Boogert	4	5
(United States) M Shaughnessy	4	2
2	(Italy) S Farina	6	6

Quarterfinals
(Spain) M Sánchez Lorenzo	2	3	r
3	(France) J Halard-Decugis	6	4
7	(United States) C Rubin	3	6	5
2	(Italy) S Farina	6	4	7

Semifinals
3	(France) J Halard-Decugis	7^{7}	6
2	(Italy) S Farina	6^{5}	1

== Qualifying ==
=== Seeds ===
1. (Japan) Miho Saeki (Qualifier)
2. (Bulgaria) Pavlina Stoyanova (first round)
3. (France) Émilie Loit (Qualifier)
4. (Belgium) Els Callens (qualifying competition)
5. (Japan) Yuka Yoshida (second round)
6. (United States) Karin Miller (second round)
7. (Slovenia) Katarina Srebotnik (first round)
8. (Netherlands) Seda Noorlander (second round)

=== Qualifiers ===
1. (Japan) Miho Saeki
2. (United States) Meilen Tu
3. (France) Émilie Loit
4. (Kazakhstan) Irina Selyutina

== Qualifying draw ==
=== Key ===
- Q = Qualifier
- WC = Wild card
- LL = Lucky loser
- Alt = Alternate
- SE = Special exempt
- PR = Protected ranking
- ITF = ITF entry
- JE = Junior exempt
- w/o = Walkover
- r = Retired
- d = Defaulted
- SR = Special ranking

=== First qualifier ===
First round
1	(Japan) Miho Saeki	6	6
(New Zealand) Shelley Stephens	0	0
(Germany) Julia Abe	6	6
(Australia) Rennae Stubbs	4	4
(United States) Tracy Singian	6	6
(Uzbekistan) Irina Yarikova	4	4
(United Kingdom) Julie Pullin	2	6	6
7	(Slovenia) Katarina Srebotnik	6	2	2

Second round
1	(Japan) Miho Saeki	7^{8}	7
(Germany) Julia Abe	6^{6}	5
(United States) Tracy Singian	4	5
(United Kingdom) Julie Pullin	6	7

Qualifying competition
(Japan) Miho Saeki	7^{7}	6^{3}	6
(United Kingdom) Julie Pullin	6^{5}	7^{7}	3

=== Second qualifier ===
First round
4	(Belgium) Els Callens	6	7^{7}
(United States) Jill Craybas	4	6^{4}
WC	(United Kingdom) Helen Reesby
(United States) Lilia Osterloh	w/o
(United States) Jackie Trail	7	1	3
(United States) Meilen Tu	5	6	6
(New Zealand) Nicola Kaiwai	1	0
6	(United States) Karin Miller	6	6

Second round
4	(Belgium) Els Callens	4	6	6
(United States) Lilia Osterloh	6	2	3
(United States) Meilen Tu	7	6
6	(United States) Karin Miller	5	2

Qualifying competition
4	(Belgium) Els Callens	6	3	5
(United States) Meilen Tu	3	6	7

=== Third qualifier ===
First round
5	(Japan) Yuka Yoshida	1	6	6
(United Kingdom) Louise Latimer	6	0	2
(United Kingdom) Lucie Ahl	4	2
(Austria) Barbara Schwartz	6	6
(New Zealand) Niki Tippins	7	7
(United Kingdom) Karen Cross	5	5
(Canada) Martina Nejedly	2	1
3	(France) Émilie Loit	6	6

Second round
5	(Japan) Yuka Yoshida	4	2
(Austria) Barbara Schwartz	6	6
(New Zealand) Niki Tippins	0	1
3	(France) Émilie Loit	6	6

Qualifying competition
(Austria) Barbara Schwartz	3	2
3	(France) Émilie Loit	6	6

=== Fourth qualifier ===
First round
8	(Netherlands) Seda Noorlander	6	6
(United States) Katie Schlukebir	4	3
(South Africa) Surina de Beer	7^{7}	5	0
(Kazakhstan) Irina Selyutina	6^{3}	7	6
(Germany) Anca Barna	6	6
(Australia) Danielle Jones	1	1
(Canada) Vanessa Webb	6	6
2	(Bulgaria) Pavlina Stoyanova	4	4

Second round
8	(Netherlands) Seda Noorlander	6	6^{6}	3
(Kazakhstan) Irina Selyutina	1	7^{8}	6
(Germany) Anca Barna	4	1
(Canada) Vanessa Webb	6	6

Qualifying competition
(Kazakhstan) Irina Selyutina	3	6	6
(Canada) Vanessa Webb	6	2	3
