= 1996 Amway Classic – Doubles =

Doubles
- 1996 Amway Classic

Final
- Champions: (Belgium) Els Callens (France) Julie Halard-Decugis
- Runners-up: (Canada) Jill Hetherington (Australia) Kristine Radford
- Score: 6–1, 6–0

Details
- Draw: 16
- Seeds: 4

Events
Singles	Doubles
← 1995 ·	WTA Auckland Open	· 1997 →

Jill Hetherington and Elna Reinach were the defending champions but only Hetherington competed that year with Kristine Radford.

Hetherington and Radford lost in the final 6–1, 6–0 against Els Callens and Julie Halard-Decugis.

== Seeds ==
Champion seeds are indicated in bold text while text in italics indicates the round in which those seeds were eliminated.

1. (Romania) Irina Spîrlea / (United States) Linda Wild (first round)
2. (Argentina) Patricia Tarabini / (Netherlands) Caroline Vis (first round)
3. (Canada) Jill Hetherington / (Australia) Kristine Radford (final)
4. (Belgium) **Els Callens** / (France) **Julie Halard-Decugis (champions)**

== Draw ==
=== Key ===
- Q = Qualifier
- WC = Wild card
- LL = Lucky loser
- Alt = Alternate
- ITF = ITF entry
- PR = Protected ranking
- SR = Special ranking
- SE = Special exempt
- JE = Junior exempt
- JR = Junior Accelerator Programme entrant
- CO = College Accelerator Programme entrant
- NG = Next Gen Accelerator Program entrant
- w/o = Walkover
- r = Retired
- d = Defaulted

First round
1	(Romania) I Spîrlea (United States) L Wild	6	3
(United States) **P Shriver** (Australia) **E Smylie**	**7**	**6**
(Japan) **R Hiraki** (Canada) **P Hy-Boulais**	**6**	**6**
(Belgium) L Courtois (Belgium) N Feber	4	4
4	(Belgium) **E Callens** (France) **J Halard-Decugis**	**6**	**6**
(Sweden) M Lindström (Sweden) M Strandlund	3	3
WC	(New Zealand) T King (New Zealand) C Toleafoa	3	0
(Japan) **K Nagatsuka** (Japan) **A Sugiyama**	**6**	**6**
(Italy) **S Farina** (Italy) **L Golarsa**	**6**	**6**
(Argentina) M Paz (Canada) R Simpson	3	4
(Australia) R McQuillan (Germany) C Porwik	6	1
3	(Canada) **J Hetherington** (Australia) **K Radford**	**7**	**6**
Q	(Finland) **N Dahlman** (United Kingdom) **C Wood**	**6**	**6**
(Romania) R Dragomir (United States) S Stafford	3	1
(France) **A Fusai** (Germany) **K Kschwendt**	**7**	**6**
2	(Argentina) P Tarabini (Netherlands) C Vis	6	3

Quarterfinals
(United States) P Shriver (Australia) E Smylie	3	4
(Japan) **R Hiraki** (Canada) **P Hy-Boulais**	**6**	**6**
4	(Belgium) **E Callens** (France) **J Halard-Decugis**	**6**	2	**6**
(Japan) K Nagatsuka (Japan) A Sugiyama	3	**6**	2
(Italy) S Farina (Italy) L Golarsa	6	3
3	(Canada) **J Hetherington** (Australia) **K Radford**	**7**	**6**
Q	(Finland) N Dahlman (United Kingdom) C Wood	5	**6**	3
(France) **A Fusai** (Germany) **K Kschwendt**	**7**	3	**6**

Semifinals
(Japan) R Hiraki (Canada) P Hy-Boulais	1	3
4	(Belgium) **E Callens** (France) **J Halard-Decugis**	**6**	**6**
3	(Canada) **J Hetherington** (Australia) **K Radford**	**6**	**6**
(France) A Fusai (Germany) K Kschwendt	3	2

Final
4	(Belgium) **Els Callens** (France) **Julie Halard-Decugis**	**6**	**6**
3	(Canada) Jill Hetherington (Australia) Kristine Radford	1	0
