= 2000 ASB Classic =

- Date: 3–8 January
- Edition: 15th
- Category: Tier IVb
- Draw: 32S / 16D
- Prize money: $110,000
- Surface: Hard / outdoor
- Location: Auckland, New Zealand
- Venue: ASB Tennis Centre

Champions

Singles
- (Luxembourg) Anne Kremer

Doubles
- (Zimbabwe) Cara Black / (France) Alexandra Fusai
← 1999 ·	WTA Auckland Open	· 2001 →

The 2000 ASB Classic was a women's tennis tournament played on outdoor hard courts at the ASB Tennis Centre in Auckland, New Zealand, that was part of Tier IVb of the 2000 WTA Tour. It was the 15th edition of the tournament and was held from 3 January until 8 January 2000. Second-seeded Anne Kremer won the singles title and earned $16,000 first-prize money.

== Finals ==
=== Singles ===
(Luxembourg) Anne Kremer defeated (Zimbabwe) Cara Black, 6–4, 6–4

- It was Kremer' 1st title of her career.

=== Doubles ===
(Zimbabwe) Cara Black / (France) Alexandra Fusai defeated (Austria) Barbara Schwartz / (Austria) Patricia Wartusch, 3–6, 6–3, 6–4

== Prize money ==
Event	W	F	SF	QF	Round of 16	Round of 32
Singles	$16,000	$8,000	$4,400	$2,500	$1,400	$850

Total prize money for the tournament was $110,000.

== See also ==
- 2000 Heineken Open – men's tournament
