= 1998 ASB Classic – Singles =

Singles
- 1998 ASB Classic
- 1997 Champion: (Austria) Marion Maruska

Final
- Champion: (Belgium) Dominique Van Roost
- Runner-up: (Italy) Silvia Farina
- Score: 4–6, 7–6, 7–5

Details
- Draw: 32
- Seeds: 8

Events
Singles	Doubles
← 1997 ·	WTA Auckland Open	· 1999 →

Marion Maruska was the defending champion but lost in the first round to Meike Babel.

Dominique Van Roost won in the final 4–6, 7–6, 7–5 against Silvia Farina.

== Seeds ==
A champion seed is indicated in bold text while text in italics indicates the round in which that seed was eliminated.

1. (France) Sandrine Testud (semifinals)
2. (United States) Lisa Raymond (quarterfinals)
3. (Belgium) **Dominique Van Roost (champion)**
4. (Austria) Barbara Schett (first round)
5. (Czech Republic) Sandra Kleinová (first round)
6. (Italy) Silvia Farina (final)
7. (Thailand) Tamarine Tanasugarn (quarterfinals)
8. (Austria) Marion Maruska (first round)

== Draw ==
=== Key ===
- Q = Qualifier
- WC = Wild card
- LL = Lucky loser
- Alt = Alternate
- SE = Special exempt
- PR = Protected ranking
- ITF = ITF entry
- JE = Junior exempt
- w/o = Walkover
- r = Retired
- d = Defaulted
- SR = Special ranking

First round
1	(France) **S Testud**	**7**	2	**6**
(United States) M Tu	5	**6**	1
Q	(United States) G Helgeson-Nielsen	6	**7**	4
(Slovakia) **J Husárová**	**7**	5	**6**
(United States) **S Cacic**	4	**6**	**6**
LL	(Czech Republic) A Gerši	**6**	3	3
(Germany) **M Babel**	**6**	**6**
8	(Austria) M Maruska	1	3
4	(Austria) B Schett	0	5
WC	(France) **J Halard-Decugis**	**6**	**7**
(Romania) **C Cristea**	**7**	4	**6**
Q	(United States) S Reeves	6	**6**	3
Q	(Austria) **B Schwartz**	**6**	**6**
(Puerto Rico) K Brandi	2	0
(France) A D-Balleret	**6**	2	2
6	(Italy) **S Farina**	1	**6**	**6**
7	(Thailand) **T Tanasugarn**	4	**6**	**6**
(China) F Li	**6**	4	2
(Japan) **Y Yoshida**	**7**	**6**
(Netherlands) K Boogert	6	1
(Italy) L Golarsa	1	**6**	1
(Czech Republic) **L Němečková**	**6**	2	**6**
(Italy) F Lubiani	3	3
3	(Belgium) **D Van Roost**	**6**	**6**
5	(Czech Republic) S Kleinová	4	4
(Spain) **C Torrens Valero**	**6**	**6**
(Japan) M Saeki	4	4
Q	(United States) **A Miller**	**6**	**6**
WC	(New Zealand) **R Hudson**	**6**	4	**6**
(Japan) R Hiraki	3	**6**	3
(Germany) B Rittner	4	**6**	4
2	(United States) **L Raymond**	**6**	3	**6**

Second round
1	(France) **S Testud**	**6**	**6**
(Slovakia) J Husárová	2	0
(United States) **S Cacic**	**w/o**
(Germany) M Babel
WC	(France) **J Halard-Decugis**	**6**	**7**
(Romania) C Cristea	2	5
Q	(Austria) B Schwartz	**6**	3	1
6	(Italy) **S Farina**	3	**6**	**6**
7	(Thailand) **T Tanasugarn**	**7**	**7**
(Japan) Y Yoshida	5	6
(Czech Republic) L Němečková	0	4
3	(Belgium) **D Van Roost**	**6**	**6**
(Spain) C Torrens Valero	5	5
Q	(United States) **A Miller**	**7**	**7**
WC	(New Zealand) R Hudson	4	4
2	(United States) **L Raymond**	**6**	**6**

Quarterfinals
1	(France) **S Testud**	**6**	**6**
(United States) S Cacic	2	2
WC	(France) J Halard-Decugis	4	3
6	(Italy) **S Farina**	**6**	**6**
7	(Thailand) T Tanasugarn	0	3
3	(Belgium) **D Van Roost**	**6**	**6**
Q	(United States) **A Miller**	**7**	**1**
2	(United States) L Raymond	5	0	r

Semifinals
1	(France) S Testud	2	6
6	(Italy) **S Farina**	**6**	**7**
3	(Belgium) **D Van Roost**	**6**	**6**
Q	(United States) A Miller	2	3

Final
6	(Italy) Silvia Farina	**6**	6	5
3	(Belgium) **D Van Roost**	4	**7**	**7**
