= 1999 ASB Classic – Doubles =

Doubles
- 1999 ASB Classic

Final
- Champions: (Italy) Silvia Farina (Austria) Barbara Schett
- Runners-up: (Netherlands) Seda Noorlander (Germany) Marlene Weingärtner
- Score: 6–2, 7–6^{(7–2)}

Details
- Draw: 16
- Seeds: 4

Events
Singles	Doubles
← 1998 ·	WTA Auckland Open	· 2000 →

The 1999 ASB Classic doubles was the doubles event of the fourteenth edition of the ASB Classic; a WTA Tier IV tournament and the most prestigious women's tennis tournament held in New Zealand. Nana Miyagi and Tamarine Tanasugarn were the reigning champions but did not compete that year.

Silvia Farina and Barbara Schett lost in the final 6–2, 7–6^{(7–2)} against Seda Noorlander and Marlene Weingärtner.

== Seeds ==
1. (Netherlands) Miriam Oremans / (United States) Chanda Rubin (first round)
2. (Belgium) Els Callens / (France) Julie Halard-Decugis (first round)
3. (Italy) Silvia Farina / (Austria) Barbara Schett (champions)
4. (Argentina) Florencia Labat / (Belgium) Dominique Van Roost (first round)

== Draw ==
=== Key ===
- Q = Qualifier
- WC = Wild card
- LL = Lucky loser
- Alt = Alternate
- ITF = ITF entry
- PR = Protected ranking
- SR = Special ranking
- SE = Special exempt
- JE = Junior exempt
- JR = Junior Accelerator Programme entrant
- CO = College Accelerator Programme entrant
- NG = Next Gen Accelerator Program entrant
- w/o = Walkover
- r = Retired
- d = Defaulted

First round
1	(Netherlands) M Oremans (United States) C Rubin	6^{4}	6	4
(Netherlands) S Noorlander (Germany) M Weingärtner	7^{7}	4	6
(United Kingdom) S Smith (United Kingdom) V Webb	2	6^{6}
(United States) L Osterloh (United States) K Schlukebir	6	7^{8}
4	(Argentina) F Labat (Belgium) D Van Roost	6	3	4
(United States) S Cacic (United States) MJ Fernández	4	6	6
(Bulgaria) P Stoyanova (Germany) E Wagner	3	0
(France) A Dechaume-Balleret (France) É Loit	6	6
(Australia) D Jones (United States) M Tu	4	0
(South Africa) S de Beer (Kazakhstan) I Selyutina	6	6
(Romania) C Cristea (Italy) R Grande	6^{4}	1
3	(Italy) S Farina (Austria) B Schett	7^{7}	6
Q	(Germany) A Barna (United States) K Miller	7	6
WC	(New Zealand) L Baker (New Zealand) R Hudson	5	3
(Japan) M Saeki (Japan) Y Yoshida	7^{7}	2	6
2	(Belgium) E Callens (France) J Halard-Decugis	6^{4}	6	1

Quarterfinals
(Netherlands) S Noorlander (Germany) M Weingärtner	6	1	6
(United States) L Osterloh (United States) K Schlukebir	1	6	4
(United States) S Cacic (United States) MJ Fernández	7^{7}	4	6
(France) A Dechaume-Balleret (France) É Loit	6^{4}	6	2
(South Africa) S de Beer (Kazakhstan) I Selyutina
3	(Italy) S Farina (Austria) B Schett	w/o
Q	(Germany) A Barna (United States) K Miller	6	6
(Japan) M Saeki (Japan) Y Yoshida	4	2

Semifinals
(Netherlands) S Noorlander (Germany) M Weingärtner	7^{7}	6
(United States) S Cacic (United States) MJ Fernández	6^{3}	0
3	(Italy) S Farina (Austria) B Schett	6	6
Q	(Germany) A Barna (United States) K Miller	4	2

Final
(Netherlands) S Noorlander (Germany) M Weingärtner	2	6^{2}
3	(Italy) S Farina (Austria) B Schett	6	7^{7}

== Qualifying ==
=== Seeds ===
1. (Germany) Anca Barna / (United States) Karin Miller (Qualifiers)
2. (United Kingdom) Lucie Ahl / (United Kingdom) Karen Cross (second round)

=== Qualifiers ===
1. (Germany) Anca Barna / (United States) Karin Miller

== Qualifying draw ==
=== Key ===
- Q = Qualifier
- WC = Wild card
- LL = Lucky loser
- Alt = Alternate
- ITF = ITF entry
- PR = Protected ranking
- SR = Special ranking
- SE = Special exempt
- JE = Junior exempt
- JR = Junior Accelerator Programme entrant
- CO = College Accelerator Programme entrant
- NG = Next Gen Accelerator Program entrant
- w/o = Walkover
- r = Retired
- d = Defaulted

First round
1	(Germany) Anca Barna (United States) Karin Miller
Bye
(United States) Tracy Singian (United States) Jackie Trail	8
(Germany) Julia Abe (Austria) Barbara Schwartz	6
(United States) Jill Craybas (Luxembourg) Anne Kremer	8
(Puerto Rico) Kristina Brandi (United States) Meghann Shaughnessy	5
(New Zealand) Shelley Stephens (New Zealand) Niki Tippins	8
2	(United Kingdom) Lucie Ahl (United Kingdom) Karen Cross	9

Second round
1	(Germany) Anca Barna (United States) Karin Miller	8
(United States) Tracy Singian (United States) Jackie Trail	4
(United States) Jill Craybas (Luxembourg) Anne Kremer	8
2	(United Kingdom) Lucie Ahl (United Kingdom) Karen Cross	6

Qualifying competition
1	(Germany) Anca Barna (United States) Karin Miller	8
(United States) Jill Craybas (Luxembourg) Anne Kremer	1
