= 1999 ASB Classic =

Women's tennis tournament

- Date: 4–9 January
- Edition: 14th
- Category: Tier IVb
- Draw: 32S / 16D
- Prize money: $112,500
- Surface: Hard / outdoor
- Location: Auckland, New Zealand
- Venue: ASB Tennis Centre

Champions

Singles
- (France) Julie Halard-Decugis

Doubles
- (Italy) Silvia Farina / (Austria) Barbara Schett
← 1998 ·	WTA Auckland Open	· 2000 →

The 1999 ASB Classic was a women's tennis tournament played on outdoor hard courts at the ASB Tennis Centre in Auckland in New Zealand that was part of Tier IVb of the 1999 WTA Tour. The tournament was held from 4 January until 9 January 1999. Third-seeded Julie Halard-Decugis won the singles title and earned $16,000 first-prize money.

== Finals ==
=== Singles ===
(France) Julie Halard-Decugis defeated (Belgium) Dominique Van Roost, 6–4, 6–1

- It was Halard-Decugis' 1st title of the year and the 14th of her career.

=== Doubles ===
(Italy) Silvia Farina / (Austria) Barbara Schett defeated (Netherlands) Seda Noorlander / (Germany) Marlene Weingärtner, 6–2, 7–6^{(7–2)}

== Prize money ==
Event	W	F	SF	QF	Round of 16	Round of 32
Singles	$16,000	$8,000	$4,400	$2,500	$1,400	$850

Total prize money for the tournament was $112,500.

== Entrants ==
=== Seeds ===
Country	Player	Rank	Seed
BEL	Dominique Van Roost	12	1
ITA	Silvia Farina	19	2
FRA	Julie Halard-Decugis	22	3
AUT	Barbara Schett	23	4
USA	Lisa Raymond	27	5
USA	Tara Snyder	34	6
USA	Chanda Rubin	35	7
VEN	María Vento	43	8

=== Other entrants ===
The following players received wildcards into the singles main draw:

- (New Zealand) Leanne Baker
- (New Zealand) Rewa Hudson

The following players received wildcards into the doubles main draw:

- (New Zealand) Leanne Baker / (New Zealand) Rewa Hudson

The following players received entry from the singles qualifying draw:

- (France) Émilie Loit
- (Kazakhstan) Irina Selyutina
- (Japan) Miho Saeki
- (United States) Meilen Tu

The following players received entry from the doubles qualifying draw:

- (Germany) Anca Barna / (United States) Karin Miller

== See also ==
- 1999 Heineken Open – men's tournament
