= 1997 ASB Classic – Doubles =

Doubles
- 1997 ASB Classic

Final
- Champions: (Slovakia) Janette Husárová (Belgium) Dominique Van Roost
- Runners-up: (Poland) Aleksandra Olsza (Germany) Elena Wagner
- Score: 6–2, 6–7, 6–3

Details
- Draw: 16
- Seeds: 4

Events
Singles	Doubles
← 1996 ·	WTA Auckland Open	· 1998 →

Els Callens and Julie Halard-Decugis were the defending champions but did not compete that year.

Janette Husárová and Dominique Van Roost won in the final 6–2, 6–7, 6–3 against Aleksandra Olsza and Elena Pampoulova.

== Seeds ==
Champion seeds are indicated in bold text while text in italics indicates the round in which those seeds were eliminated.

1. (Japan) Rika Hiraki / (South Korea) Sung-Hee Park (quarterfinals)
2. (France) Alexandra Fusai / (Argentina) Mercedes Paz (semifinals)
3. (Canada) Sonya Jeyaseelan / (Canada) Rene Simpson (quarterfinals)
4. (Italy) Laura Golarsa / (Canada) Patricia Hy-Boulais (first round)

== Draw ==
=== Key ===
- Q = Qualifier
- WC = Wild card
- LL = Lucky loser
- Alt = Alternate
- ITF = ITF entry
- PR = Protected ranking
- SR = Special ranking
- SE = Special exempt
- JE = Junior exempt
- JR = Junior Accelerator Programme entrant
- CO = College Accelerator Programme entrant
- NG = Next Gen Accelerator Program entrant
- w/o = Walkover
- r = Retired
- d = Defaulted

First round
1	(Japan) **R Hiraki** (South Korea) **S-H Park**	**7**	**7**
(Austria) K Kschwendt (Austria) B Schett	5	6
(Netherlands) S Noorlander (France) S Pitkowski	2	4
(Slovakia) **J Husárová** (Belgium) **D Van Roost**	**6**	**6**
3	(Canada) **S Jeyaseelan** (Canada) **R Simpson**	3	**6**	**6**
(United States) L Lee (Germany) C Schneider	**6**	2	3
LL	(Austria) M Maruska (Israel) H Rosen	3	5
(Germany) **A Huber** (United States) **L Wild**	**6**	**7**
(Australia) **D Jones** (Thailand) **T Tanasugarn**	**w/o**
(United States) A Grossman (Argentina) F Labat
(Poland) **A Olsza** (Germany) **E Wagner**	**7**	2	**6**
4	(Italy) L Golarsa (Canada) P Hy-Boulais	6	**6**	4
(Belgium) **N Feber** (United States) **G Helgeson-Nielsen**	**6**	**6**
Q	(Japan) Y Hosoki (Germany) M Weingärtner	3	4
(Georgia (country)) N Louarsabishvili (United States) M Tu	**6**	2	4
2	(France) **A Fusai** (Argentina) **M Paz**	4	**6**	**6**

Quarterfinals
1	(Japan) R Hiraki (South Korea) S-H Park	6	3
(Slovakia) **J Husárová** (Belgium) **D Van Roost**	**7**	**6**
3	(Canada) S Jeyaseelan (Canada) R Simpson	3	2
(Germany) **A Huber** (United States) **L Wild**	**6**	**6**
(Australia) D Jones (Thailand) T Tanasugarn	4	2
(Poland) **A Olsza** (Germany) **E Wagner**	**6**	**6**
(Belgium) N Feber (United States) G Helgeson-Nielsen	3	5
2	(France) **A Fusai** (Argentina) **M Paz**	**6**	**7**

Semifinals
(Slovakia) **J Husárová** (Belgium) **D Van Roost**	**6**	4	**6**
(Germany) A Huber (United States) L Wild	4	**6**	2
(Poland) A Olsza (Germany) E Wagner	4	**6**	**7**
2	(France) A Fusai (Argentina) M Paz	**6**	1	5

Final
(Slovakia) **Janette Husárová** (Belgium) **Dominique Van Roost**	**6**	6	**6**
(Poland) Aleksandra Olsza (Germany) Elena Wagner	2	**7**	3
