= 2001 ASB Classic – Doubles =

Doubles
- 2001 ASB Classic

Final
- Champions: (France) Alexandra Fusai (Italy) Rita Grande
- Runners-up: (Switzerland) Emmanuelle Gagliardi (Austria) Barbara Schett
- Score: 7–6^{(7–4)}, 6–3

Details
- Draw: 16
- Seeds: 4

Events
| Singles | Doubles |
| ← 2000 · | WTA Auckland Open | · 2002 → |

Cara Black and Alexandra Fusai were the defending champions but they competed with different partners that year, Black with Sandrine Testud and Fusai with Rita Grande.

Black and Testud lost in the semifinals to Emmanuelle Gagliardi and Barbara Schett.

Fusai and Grande won in the final 7–6^{(7–4)}, 6–3 against Gagliardi and Schett.

== Seeds ==
Champion seeds are indicated in bold text while text in italics indicates the round in which those seeds were eliminated.

1. (Zimbabwe) Cara Black / (France) Sandrine Testud (semifinals)
2. (South Africa) Liezel Horn / (Argentina) Paola Suárez (semifinals)
3. (France) **Alexandra Fusai** / (Italy) **Rita Grande (champions)**
4. (Slovenia) Tina Križan / (Slovenia) Katarina Srebotnik (quarterfinals)

== Draw ==
=== Key ===
- Q = Qualifier
- WC = Wild card
- LL = Lucky loser
- Alt = Alternate
- SE = Special exempt
- PR = Protected ranking
- ITF = ITF entry
- JE = Junior exempt
- w/o = Walkover
- r = Retired
- d = Defaulted
- SR = Special ranking

First round
1 | (Zimbabwe) **C Black** (France) **S Testud** | **7^{7}** | **6**
(Netherlands) Y Basting (Germany) C Schneider | 6^{2} | 1
(United States) A Bradshaw (United States) J Hopkins | 3 | 6^{6}
(South Africa) **K Grant** (Austria) **M Maruska** | **6** | **7^{8}**
4 | (Slovenia) **T Križan** (Slovenia) **K Srebotnik** | **6** | **6**
(United States) H Parkinson (Venezuela) M Sequera | 3 | 1
(Argentina) M E Salerni (New Zealand) S Stephens | 1 | 2
(Switzerland) **E Gagliardi** (Austria) **B Schett** | **6** | **6**
(Germany) A Bachmann (Argentina) M Díaz Oliva | 3 | 4
(France) **N Dechy** (France) **É Loit** | **6** | **6**
Q | (Japan) H Inoue (Japan) M Inoue | 4 | **6** | 2
3 | (France) **A Fusai** (Italy) **R Grande** | **6** | 2 | **6**
WC | (New Zealand) L Baker (Bulgaria) P Nola | **6** | 2 | 2
(Japan) **S Asagoe** (Japan) **Y Yoshida** | 4 | **6** | **6**
(United States) L Osterloh (United States) M Tu | 2 | 1
2 | (South Africa) **L Horn** (Argentina) **P Suárez** | **6** | **6**

Quarterfinals
1 | (Zimbabwe) **C Black** (France) **S Testud** | **7** | **6**
(South Africa) K Grant (Austria) M Maruska | 5 | 4
4 | (Slovenia) T Križan (Slovenia) K Srebotnik | **6** | 2 | 2
(Switzerland) **E Gagliardi** (Austria) **B Schett** | 2 | **6** | **6**
(France) N Dechy (France) É Loit | 1 | 5
3 | (France) **A Fusai** (Italy) **R Grande** | **6** | **7**
(Japan) S Asagoe (Japan) Y Yoshida | 2 | 6^{3}
2 | (South Africa) **L Horn** (Argentina) **P Suárez** | **6** | **7^{7}**

Semifinals
1 | (Zimbabwe) C Black (France) S Testud | 2 | 3
(Switzerland) **E Gagliardi** (Austria) **B Schett** | **6** | **6**
3 | (France) **A Fusai** (Italy) **R Grande** | 2 | **7^{7}** | **6**
2 | (South Africa) L Horn (Argentina) P Suárez | **6** | 6^{4} | 4

Final
(Switzerland) Emmanuelle Gagliardi (Austria) Barbara Schett | 6^{4} | 3
3 | (France) **Alexandra Fusai** (Italy) **Rita Grande** | **7^{7}** | **6**

== Qualifying ==
=== Seeds ===
1. (United States) Amanda Augustus / (Australia) Amy Jensen (second round)
2. (Japan) **Haruka Inoue** / (Japan) **Maiko Inoue (Qualifiers)**

=== Qualifiers ===
1. **(Japan) Haruka Inoue / (Japan) Maiko Inoue**

==== Draw ====
- NB: The first two rounds used the pro set format.

First round
1 | (United States) **Amanda Augustus** (Australia) **Amy Jensen** | **8**
(France) Stéphanie Foretz (Japan) Rika Fujiwara | 4
WC | (New Zealand) Ilke Gers (New Zealand) Tracey O'Connor | 8^{1}
(Italy) **Francesca Schiavone** (Germany) **Marlene Weingärtner** | **9^{7}**
(Tunisia) **Selima Sfar** (United Kingdom) **Joanne Ward** | **9**
(Luxembourg) Anne Kremer (France) Sarah Pitkowski | 7
(United States) Jill Craybas (United States) Sarah Taylor | 3
2 | (Japan) **Haruka Inoue** (Japan) **Maiko Inoue** | **8**

Second round
1 | (United States) Amanda Augustus (Australia) Amy Jensen | 4
(Italy) **Francesca Schiavone** (Germany) **Marlene Weingärtner** | **8**
(Tunisia) Selima Sfar (United Kingdom) Joanne Ward | 7^{r}
2 | (Japan) **Haruka Inoue** (Japan) **Maiko Inoue** | 4

Final Round
(Italy) Francesca Schiavone (Germany) Marlene Weingärtner | 1 | 2
2 | (Japan) **Haruka Inoue** (Japan) **Maiko Inoue** | **6** | **6**
