= 1996 Amway Classic – Singles =

Singles
- 1996 Amway Classic
- 1995 Champion: (Australia) Nicole Bradtke

Final
- Champion: (United States) Sandra Cacic
- Runner-up: (Austria) Barbara Paulus
- Score: 6–3, 1–6, 6–4

Details
- Draw: 32
- Seeds: 8

Events
Singles	Doubles
← 1995 ·	WTA Auckland Open	· 1997 →

Nicole Bradtke was the defending champion but did not compete that year.

Sandra Cacic won in the final 6–3, 1–6, 6–4 against Barbara Paulus.

== Seeds ==
A champion seed is indicated in bold text while text in italics indicates the round in which that seed was eliminated.

1. (Romania) Irina Spîrlea (first round)
2. (Austria) Barbara Paulus (final)
3. (Austria) Judith Wiesner (first round)
4. (South Africa) Joannette Kruger (second round)
5. (Mexico) Angélica Gavaldón (first round)
6. (Japan) Kyoko Nagatsuka (first round)
7. (Germany) Sabine Hack (quarterfinals)
8. (Chinese Taipei) Wang Shi-ting (first round)

== Draw ==
=== Key ===
- Q = Qualifier
- WC = Wild card
- LL = Lucky loser
- Alt = Alternate
- ITF = ITF entry
- PR = Protected ranking
- SR = Special ranking
- SE = Special exempt
- JE = Junior exempt
- JR = Junior Accelerator Programme entrant
- CO = College Accelerator Programme entrant
- NG = Next Gen Accelerator Program entrant
- w/o = Walkover
- r = Retired
- d = Defaulted

First round
1	(Romania) I Spîrlea	5	2
(France) **J Halard-Decugis**	**7**	**6**
(Belgium) **L Courtois**	2	**6**	**6**
(Czech Republic) L Richterová	**6**	4	4
(Germany) **J Kandarr**	1	**7**	**6**
(Belgium) E Callens	**6**	5	1
Q	(United States) **S Cacic**	**6**	**6**
6	(Japan) K Nagatsuka	2	1
4	(South Africa) **J Kruger**	5	**6**	**6**
(Canada) J Nejedly	**7**	2	4
(United States) L Wild	3	**6**	1
(Argentina) **F Labat**	**6**	1	**6**
(Italy) **S Farina**	6	**6**	**6**
Q	(Belgium) N Feber	**7**	2	2
(Canada) P Hy-Boulais	3	**6**	1
7	(Germany) **S Hack**	**6**	2	**6**
5	(Mexico) A Gavaldón	3	3
Q	(Germany) **A Glass**	**6**	**6**
(Israel) A Smashnova	1	**7**	1
Q	(China) **F Li**	**6**	6	**6**
(Italy) **R Grande**	**6**	**6**
WC	(New Zealand) C Toleafoa	3	3
(Japan) **A Sugiyama**	**6**	**6**
3	(Austria) J Wiesner	3	4
8	(Chinese Taipei) S-T Wang	2	**6**	4
(Germany) **K Kschwendt**	**6**	2	**6**
(United States) L Lee	3	1
(Australia) **R McQuillan**	**6**	**6**
WC	(United States) **P Shriver**	**6**	**6**
(Romania) R Dragomir	4	4
(Russia) E Likhovtseva	3	5
2	(Austria) **B Paulus**	**6**	**7**

Second round
(France) **J Halard-Decugis**	**7**	**6**
(Belgium) L Courtois	5	4
(Germany) J Kandarr	2	2
Q	(United States) **S Cacic**	**6**	**6**
4	(South Africa) J Kruger	2	4
(Argentina) **F Labat**	**6**	**6**
(Italy) S Farina	4	2
7	(Germany) **S Hack**	**6**	**6**
Q	(Germany) A Glass	**6**	4	6
Q	(China) **F Li**	2	**6**	**7**
(Italy) **R Grande**	**6**	**6**
(Japan) A Sugiyama	3	3
(Germany) **K Kschwendt**	**7**	**7**
(Australia) R McQuillan	6	5
WC	(United States) P Shriver	2	**6**	3
2	(Austria) **B Paulus**	**6**	3	**6**

Quarterfinals
(France) J Halard-Decugis	4	**6**	4
Q	(United States) **S Cacic**	**6**	4	**6**
(Argentina) **F Labat**	**6**	1	**7**
7	(Germany) S Hack	2	**6**	6
Q	(China) **F Li**	2	**7**	**6**
(Italy) R Grande	**6**	5	3
(Germany) K Kschwendt	2	2
2	(Austria) **B Paulus**	**6**	**6**

Semifinals
Q	(United States) **S Cacic**	**6**	**6**
(Argentina) F Labat	3	4
Q	(China) F Li	3	4
2	(Austria) **B Paulus**	**6**	**6**

Final
Q	(United States) **Sandra Cacic**	**6**	1	**6**
2	(Austria) Barbara Paulus	3	**6**	4
