= 2000 ASB Classic – Doubles =

Doubles
- 2000 ASB Classic

Final
- Champions: (Zimbabwe) Cara Black (France) Alexandra Fusai
- Runners-up: (Austria) Barbara Schwartz (Austria) Patricia Wartusch
- Score: 3–6, 6–3, 6–4

Details
- Draw: 16
- Seeds: 4

Events
Singles	Doubles
← 1999 ·	WTA Auckland Open	· 2001 →

Silvia Farina Elia and Barbara Schett were the reigning champions, but none competed this year. Schett represented Austria at the Hopman Cup in Perth, which was held at the same week.

Cara Black and Alexandra Fusai won the title by defeating Barbara Schwartz and Patricia Wartusch 3–6, 6–3, 6–4 in the final.

== Seeds ==
1. (Zimbabwe) Cara Black / (France) Alexandra Fusai (champions)
2. (Argentina) Florencia Labat / (Russia) Elena Likhovtseva (quarterfinals)
3. (Slovenia) Tina Križan / (Slovenia) Katarina Srebotnik (semifinals)
4. (Spain) Virginia Ruano Pascual / (Argentina) Paola Suárez (semifinals)

== Draw ==
=== Key ===
- Q = Qualifier
- WC = Wild card
- LL = Lucky loser
- Alt = Alternate
- ITF = ITF entry
- PR = Protected ranking
- SR = Special ranking
- SE = Special exempt
- JE = Junior exempt
- JR = Junior Accelerator Programme entrant
- CO = College Accelerator Programme entrant
- NG = Next Gen Accelerator Program entrant
- w/o = Walkover
- r = Retired
- d = Defaulted

=== Draw ===
First round
1	(Zimbabwe) C Black (France) A Fusai	6	6
WC	(New Zealand) L Baker (Slovenia) P Rampre	3	1
(Spain) M Sánchez Lorenzo (United States) M Shaughnessy	6	7
(Argentina) M Díaz Oliva (Canada) R Kolbovic	2	5
3	(Slovenia) T Križan (Slovenia) K Srebotnik	6	7^{7}
(Netherlands) A Hopmans (Netherlands) S Noorlander	3	6^{3}
(Canada) M Drake (United States) K Schlukebir	6^{2}	6	3
(Japan) S Asagoe (Japan) Y Yoshida	7^{7}	3	6
(Australia) C Barclay (Canada) V Webb	4	3
Q	(Germany) A Bachmann (Denmark) E Dyrberg	6	6
(Bulgaria) S Krivencheva (Spain) A Ortuño	0	3
4	(Spain) V Ruano Pascual (Argentina) P Suárez	6	6
(Austria) B Schwartz (Austria) P Wartusch	6	6
(Spain) E Bes (Spain) G Riera	3	2
(Romania) M Mihalache (Slovakia) Z Váleková	4	4
2	(Argentina) F Labat (Russia) E Likhovtseva	6	6

Quarterfinals
1	(Zimbabwe) C Black (France) A Fusai	6	6
(Spain) M Sánchez Lorenzo (United States) M Shaughnessy	4	4
3	(Slovenia) T Križan (Slovenia) K Srebotnik	6	6
(Japan) S Asagoe (Japan) Y Yoshida	4	3
Q	(Germany) A Bachmann (Denmark) E Dyrberg	4	1
4	(Spain) V Ruano Pascual (Argentina) P Suárez	6	6
(Austria) B Schwartz (Austria) P Wartusch	6	2	6
2	(Argentina) F Labat (Russia) E Likhovtseva	1	6	4

Semifinals
1	(Zimbabwe) C Black (France) A Fusai	6	7^{7}
3	(Slovenia) T Križan (Slovenia) K Srebotnik	2	6^{4}
4	(Spain) V Ruano Pascual (Argentina) P Suárez	3	2
(Austria) B Schwartz (Austria) P Wartusch	6	6

Final
1	(Zimbabwe) C Black (France) A Fusai	3	6	6
(Austria) B Schwartz (Austria) P Wartusch	6	3	4
