= 1998 ASB Classic – Doubles =

Doubles
- 1998 ASB Classic

Final
- Champions: (Japan) Nana Miyagi (Thailand) Tamarine Tanasugarn
- Runners-up: (France) Julie Halard-Decugis (Slovakia) Janette Husárová
- Score: 7–6, 6–4

Details
- Draw: 16
- Seeds: 4

Events
Singles	Doubles
← 1997 ·	WTA Auckland Open	· 1999 →

Janette Husárová and Dominique Van Roost were the defending champions but they competed with different partners that year, Husárová with Julie Halard-Decugis and Van Roost with Laura Golarsa.

Golarsa and Van Roost lost in the quarterfinals to Halard-Decugis and Husárová.

Halard-Decugis and Husárová lost in the final 7–6, 6–4 against Nana Miyagi and Tamarine Tanasugarn.

== Seeds ==
Champion seeds are indicated in bold text while text in italics indicates the round in which those seeds were eliminated.

1. (Japan) Rika Hiraki / (Argentina) Mercedes Paz (first round)
2. (Japan) **Nana Miyagi** / (Thailand) **Tamarine Tanasugarn (champions)**
3. (Belgium) Els Callens / (United States) Ginger Helgeson-Nielsen (quarterfinals)
4. (Italy) Silvia Farina / (Austria) Barbara Schett (semifinals)

== Draw ==
=== Key ===
- Q = Qualifier
- WC = Wild card
- LL = Lucky loser
- Alt = Alternate
- SE = Special exempt
- PR = Protected ranking
- ITF = ITF entry
- JE = Junior exempt
- w/o = Walkover
- r = Retired
- d = Defaulted
- SR = Special ranking

First round
1	(Japan) R Hiraki (Argentina) M Paz	3	**6**	3
(Italy) **L Golarsa** (Belgium) **D Van Roost**	**6**	4	**6**
(France) **J Halard-Decugis** (Slovakia) **J Husárová**	**6**	**6**
(Germany) B Rittner (Germany) E Wagner	3	3
4	(Italy) **S Farina** (Austria) **B Schett**	**7**	**6**
(Austria) K Kschwendt (Czech Republic) L Němečková	6	4
(Romania) **C Cristea** (South Korea) **E-H Kim**	**6**	**6**
Q	(Zimbabwe) C Black (India) N Vaidyanathan	3	4
(Slovenia) T Križan (Bulgaria) P Stoyanova	4	5
(South Africa) **N de Villiers** (Australia) **D Jones**	**6**	**7**
(Canada) P Hy-Boulais (Canada) S Jeyaseelan	2	2
3	(Belgium) **E Callens** (United States) **G Helgeson-Nielsen**	**6**	**6**
WC	(New Zealand) **L Baker** (New Zealand) **R Hudson**	**6**	**7**
(Hungary) K Marosi (Germany) C Schneider	2	5
(France) A Dechaume-Balleret (France) S Testud	3	1
2	(Japan) **N Miyagi** (Thailand) **T Tanasugarn**	**6**	**6**

Quarterfinals
(Italy) L Golarsa (Belgium) D Van Roost	3	3
(France) **J Halard-Decugis** (Slovakia) **J Husárová**	**6**	**6**
4	(Italy) **S Farina** (Austria) **B Schett**	**6**	**6**
(Romania) C Cristea (South Korea) E-H Kim	4	3
(South Africa) **N de Villiers** (Australia) **D Jones**	**5**
3	(Belgium) E Callens (United States) G Helgeson-Nielsen	3	r
WC	(New Zealand) L Baker (New Zealand) R Hudson	2	6
2	(Japan) **N Miyagi** (Thailand) **T Tanasugarn**	**6**	**7**

Semifinals
(France) **J Halard-Decugis** (Slovakia) **J Husárová**	1	**7**	**6**
4	(Italy) S Farina (Austria) B Schett	**6**	6	2
(South Africa) N de Villiers (Australia) D Jones	**6**	4	0
2	(Japan) **N Miyagi** (Thailand) **T Tanasugarn**	4	**6**	**6**

Final
(France) Julie Halard-Decugis (Slovakia) Janette Husárová	6	4
2	(Japan) **Nana Miyagi** (Thailand) **Tamarine Tanasugarn**	**7**	**6**
