= 1998 ASB Classic =

- Date: 5–10 January
- Edition: 13th
- Category: Tier IV
- Draw: 32S / 16D
- Prize money: $107,500
- Surface: Hard (Rebound Ace) / outdoor
- Location: Auckland, New Zealand
- Venue: ASB Tennis Centre

Champions

Singles
- (Belgium) Dominique Van Roost

Doubles
- (Japan) Nana Miyagi (Thailand) Tamarine Tanasugarn
← 1997 ·	WTA Auckland Open	· 1999 →

The 1998 ASB Classic was a women's tennis tournament played on outdoor hard courts at the ASB Tennis Centre in Auckland in New Zealand that was part of Tier IV of the 1998 WTA Tour. The tournament was held from 5 January until 10 January 1998. Third-seeded Dominique Van Roost won the singles title and earned $17,700 first-prize money.

== Finals ==
=== Singles ===
(Belgium) Dominique Van Roost defeated (Italy) Silvia Farina, 4–6, 7–6^{(11–9)}, 7–5

- It was Van Roost's 1st title of the year and the 6th of her career.

=== Doubles ===
(Japan) Nana Miyagi / (Thailand) Tamarine Tanasugarn defeated (France) Julie Halard-Decugis / (Slovakia) Janette Husárová, 7–6^{(7–1)}, 6–4

- It was Miyagi's 1st title of the year and the 8th of her career. It was Tanasugarn's only title of the year and the 1st of her career.

== Prize money ==
Event	W	F	SF	QF	Round of 16	Round of 32
Singles	$17,700	$8,350	$4,275	$2,150	$1,115	$700

== See also ==
- 1998 Heineken Open – men's tournament
