= 2000 Internationaux de Strasbourg – Doubles =

Doubles
- 2000 Internationaux de Strasbourg

Final
- Champions: (Canada) Sonya Jeyaseelan (Argentina) Florencia Labat
- Runners-up: (South Africa) Kim Grant (Venezuela) María Vento
- Score: 6–4, 6–3

Details
- Draw: 16 (1WC/1Q)
- Seeds: 4

Events
Singles	Doubles
← 1999 ·	Internationaux de Strasbourg	· 2001 →

Elena Likhovtseva and Ai Sugiyama were the defending champions, but Sugiyama chose to compete at Madrid during the same week. Likhovtseva teamed up with Corina Morariu and lost in the first round to Eva Martincová and Sandra Načuk.

Sonya Jeyaseelan and Florencia Labat won the title by defeating Kim Grant and María Vento 6–4, 6–3 in the final.

== Seeds ==
1. (Russia) Elena Likhovtseva / (United States) Corina Morariu (first round)
2. (France) Alexandra Fusai / (France) Nathalie Tauziat (quarterfinals)
3. (South Africa) Liezel Horn / (Argentina) Laura Montalvo (first round)
4. (Belgium) Els Callens / (Belgium) Dominique Van Roost (quarterfinals)

== Draw ==
=== Key ===
- Q = Qualifier
- WC = Wild card
- LL = Lucky loser
- Alt = Alternate
- SE = Special exempt
- PR = Protected ranking
- ITF = ITF entry
- JE = Junior exempt
- w/o = Walkover
- r = Retired
- d = Defaulted
- SR = Special ranking

=== Draw ===
First round
1	(Russia) E Likhovtseva (United States) C Morariu	6	1	6^{5}
(Czech Republic) E Martincová (Federal Republic of Yugoslavia) S Načuk	0	6	7^{7}
(South Africa) N de Villiers (Thailand) T Tanasugarn	6	6
WC	(France) S Foretz (France) V Razzano	2	3
3	(South Africa) L Horn (Argentina) L Montalvo	3	6	2
(Russia) N Petrova (United States) A Stevenson	6	3	6
Q	(South Africa) K Grant (Venezuela) M Vento	7	2	6
(Russia) A Jidkova (Germany) S Schmidle	5	6	1
(Canada) S Jeyaseelan (Argentina) F Labat	6	6
(Germany) J Wöhr (United Kingdom) L Woodroffe	4	2
(Australia) C Barclay (Canada) V Webb	6^{7}	5
4	(Belgium) E Callens (Belgium) D Van Roost	7^{9}	7
(United States) L Osterloh (United States) H Parkinson	2	0
(France) A Cocheteux (France) N Dechy	6	6
(South Africa) J Kruger (United States) T Snyder	2	1
2	(France) A Fusai (France) N Tauziat	6	6

Quarterfinals
(Czech Republic) E Martincová (Federal Republic of Yugoslavia) S Načuk	1	6	6
(South Africa) N de Villiers (Thailand) T Tanasugarn	6	3	4
(Russia) N Petrova (United States) A Stevenson	7	6^{1}	3
Q	(South Africa) K Grant (Venezuela) M Vento	5	7^{7}	6
(Canada) S Jeyaseelan (Argentina) F Labat	7	6
4	(Belgium) E Callens (Belgium) D Van Roost	5	4
(France) A Cocheteux (France) N Dechy	6	6
2	(France) A Fusai (France) N Tauziat	2	4

Semifinals
(Czech Republic) E Martincová (Federal Republic of Yugoslavia) S Načuk	3	6^{3}
Q	(South Africa) K Grant (Venezuela) M Vento	6	7^{7}
(Canada) S Jeyaseelan (Argentina) F Labat	6	4	7^{7}
(France) A Cocheteux (France) N Dechy	4	6	6^{5}

Final
Q	(South Africa) K Grant (Venezuela) M Vento	4	3
(Canada) S Jeyaseelan (Argentina) F Labat	6	6
