= 1999 Nokia Cup =

- Date: 8–14 February
- Edition: 1st
- Category: Tier IVb
- Draw: 32S / 16D
- Prize money: $112,500
- Surface: Carpet / indoor
- Location: Prostějov, Czech Republic

Champions

Singles
- (Slovakia) Henrieta Nagyová

Doubles
- (France) Alexandra Fusai / (France) Nathalie Tauziat
- Nokia Cup

The 1999 Nokia Cup was an indoor women's tennis tournament played on indoor carpet courts in Prostějov, Czech Republic. The tournament was one of the WTA Tier IV tournaments in the 1999 WTA Tour. It was the inaugural and only edition of the tournament and was held from 8 February until 14 February 1999. Fourth-seeded Henrieta Nagyová won the singles title.

== Finals ==
=== Singles ===
(Slovakia) Henrieta Nagyová defeated (Italy) Silvia Farina, 7–6^{(7–2)}, 6–4

- It was Nagyová's only title of the year and the 7th of her career.

=== Doubles ===
(France) Alexandra Fusai / (France) Nathalie Tauziat defeated (Czech Republic) Květa Hrdličková / (Czech Republic) Helena Vildová, 3–6, 6–2, 6–1

== Entrants ==
=== Seeds ===
Country	Player	Rank	Seed
FRA	Nathalie Tauziat	10	1
BEL	Dominique Van Roost	11	2
ITA	Silvia Farina	21	3
SVK	Henrieta Nagyová	30	4
FRA	Alexandra Fusai	38	5
ESP	María Sánchez Lorenzo	40	6
ROU	Ruxandra Dragomir	42	7
FRA	Nathalie Dechy	44	8

=== Other entrants ===
The following players received wildcards into the singles main draw:

- (Czech Republic) Michaela Paštiková
- (Czech Republic) Lenka Němečková

The following players received wildcards into the doubles main draw:

- (Slovakia) Henrieta Nagyová / (Czech Republic) Lenka Němečková

The following players received entry from the qualifying draw:

- (Czech Republic) Denisa Chládková
- (Germany) Julia Abe
- (Netherlands) Amanda Hopmans
- (Germany) Anca Barna

The following player received entry as a lucky loser:

- (Slovakia) Katarína Studeníková
