= 1999 Nokia Cup – Doubles =

Doubles
- 1999 Nokia Cup

Final
- Champions: (France) Alexandra Fusai (France) Nathalie Tauziat
- Runners-up: (Czech Republic) Květa Hrdličková (Czech Republic) Helena Vildová
- Score: 3–6, 6–2, 6–1

Details
- Draw: 16
- Seeds: 4

Events
Singles	Doubles
- Nokia Cup

The 1999 Nokia Cup was a WTA Tier IV tournament held in Prostějov, Czech Republic, and the only edition of the Nokia Cup. Frenchwomen Alexandra Fusai and Nathalie Tauziat won in the final 3–6, 6–2, 6–1 against home competitors Květa Hrdličková and Helena Vildová.

== Seeds ==
1. (France) Alexandra Fusai / (France) Nathalie Tauziat (champions)
2. (Italy) Silvia Farina / (Slovakia) Karina Habšudová (first round)
3. (Belgium) Laurence Courtois / (Belgium) Dominique Van Roost (semifinals, withdrew)
4. (Romania) Cătălina Cristea / (Romania) Ruxandra Dragomir (quarterfinals)

== Draw ==
Key

- Q = Qualifier
- WC = Wild card
- LL = Lucky loser
- Alt = Alternate
- ITF = ITF entry
- PR = Protected ranking
- SR = Special ranking
- SE = Special exempt
- JE = Junior exempt
- JR = Junior Accelerator Programme entrant
- CO = College Accelerator Programme entrant
- NG = Next Gen Accelerator Program entrant
- w/o = Walkover
- r = Retired
- d = Defaulted

First round
1	(France) A Fusai (France) N Tauziat	6^{4}	6	6
(France) A Dechaume-Balleret (Italy) L Golarsa	7^{7}	1	1
(Germany) A Barna (Germany) S Schmidle	3	1
(Slovakia) J Husárová (Poland) A Olsza	6	6
3	(Belgium) L Courtois (Belgium) D Van Roost	6	3	6
(United Kingdom) J Pullin (Austria) P Wartusch	3	6	2
(Belarus) O Barabanschikova (Germany) B Rittner	5	6	6
(Sweden) Å Carlsson (Czech Republic) E Melicharová	7	3	4
(Czech Republic) O Blahotová (Czech Republic) M Paštiková	1	2
(Czech Republic) K Hrdličková (Czech Republic) H Vildová	6	6
(Russia) E Kulikovskaya (Austria) K Kschwendt	2	0	r
4	(Romania) C Cristea (Romania) R Dragomir	6	3
(France) A-G Sidot (Germany) E Wagner	6	6
(France) A Cocheteux (Germany) M Weingärtner	4	2
WC	(Slovakia) H Nagyová (Czech Republic) L Němečková	5	6	6
2	(Italy) S Farina (Slovakia) K Habšudová	7	3	4

Quarterfinals
1	(France) A Fusai (France) N Tauziat	7^{7}	6
(Slovakia) J Husárová (Poland) A Olsza	6^{3}	3
3	(Belgium) L Courtois (Belgium) D Van Roost	w/o
(Belarus) O Barabanschikova (Germany) B Rittner
(Czech Republic) K Hrdličková (Czech Republic) H Vildová	6	6
4	(Romania) C Cristea (Romania) R Dragomir	1	4
(France) A-G Sidot (Germany) E Wagner	1	3
WC	(Slovakia) H Nagyová (Czech Republic) L Němečková	6	6

Semifinals
1	(France) A Fusai (France) N Tauziat	w/o
3	(Belgium) L Courtois (Belgium) D Van Roost
(Czech Republic) K Hrdličková (Czech Republic) H Vildová	7	6
WC	(Slovakia) H Nagyová (Czech Republic) L Němečková	5	4

Final
1	(France) A Fusai (France) N Tauziat	3	6	6
(Czech Republic) K Hrdličková (Czech Republic) H Vildová	6	2	1
