= 2000 ASB Classic – Singles =

Singles
- 2000 ASB Classic

Final
- Champion: (Luxembourg) Anne Kremer
- Runner-up: (Zimbabwe) Cara Black
- Score: 6–4, 6–4

Details
- Draw: 32
- Seeds: 8

Events
Singles	Doubles
← 1999 ·	WTA Auckland Open	· 2001 →

Julie Halard-Decugis was the reigning champion, but decided to compete in Gold Coast that same week.

Anne Kremer won the title by defeating Cara Black 6–4, 6–4 in the final.

== Seeds ==
1. (Russia) Elena Likhovtseva (quarterfinals)
2. (Luxembourg) Anne Kremer (champion)
3. (Spain) María Sánchez Lorenzo (first round)
4. (Austria) Barbara Schwartz (first round)
5. (Israel) Anna Smashnova (quarterfinals)
6. (Zimbabwe) Cara Black (final)
7. (United States) Kristina Brandi (first round)
8. (Canada) Maureen Drake (first round)

== Draw ==
=== Key ===
- Q = Qualifier
- WC = Wild card
- LL = Lucky loser
- Alt = Alternate
- ITF = ITF entry
- PR = Protected ranking
- SR = Special ranking
- SE = Special exempt
- JE = Junior exempt
- JR = Junior Accelerator Programme entrant
- CO = College Accelerator Programme entrant
- NG = Next Gen Accelerator Program entrant
- w/o = Walkover
- r = Retired
- d = Defaulted

=== Finals ===
Semifinals
6	(Zimbabwe) Cara Black	6	6
(Netherlands) Amanda Hopmans	3	3
(United States) Meghann Shaughnessy	3	3
2	(Luxembourg) Anne Kremer	6	6

Final
6	(Zimbabwe) Cara Black	4	4
2	(Luxembourg) Anne Kremer	6	6

=== Top half ===
First round
1	(Russia) E Likhovtseva	6	6
(Venezuela) M Vento	3	3
(Slovenia) K Srebotnik	6	6
(United States) B Rippner	4	2
(Austria) P Wartusch	6	1	3
(Canada) J Nejedly	1	6	6
(Netherlands) S Noorlander	0	1
6	(Zimbabwe) C Black	6	6
3	(Spain) M Sánchez Lorenzo	6^{6}	4
(Switzerland) M Vavrinec	7^{8}	6
(Germany) M Weingärtner	4	6^{3}
Q	(Spain) N Llagostera Vives	6	7^{7}
WC	(New Zealand) R Hudson	3	3
(Netherlands) A Hopmans	6	6
(France) É Loit	6	6
8	(Canada) M Drake	3	3

Second round
1	(Russia) E Likhovtseva	3	6	6
(Slovenia) K Srebotnik	6	0	4
(Canada) J Nejedly	1	6^{3}
6	(Zimbabwe) C Black	6	7^{7}
(Switzerland) M Vavrinec	6	0	6
Q	(Spain) N Llagostera Vives	2	6	3
(Netherlands) A Hopmans	0	6	6
(France) É Loit	6	3	3

Quarterfinals
1	(Russia) E Likhovtseva	3	5
6	(Zimbabwe) C Black	6	7
(Switzerland) M Vavrinec	6^{6}	2
(Netherlands) A Hopmans	7^{8}	6

Semifinals
6	(Zimbabwe) C Black	6	6
(Netherlands) A Hopmans	3	3

=== Bottom half ===
First round
5	(Israel) A Smashnova	6	6
(United States) M Tu	3	4
(Hungary) P Mandula	6	4	4
(Spain) V Ruano Pascual	3	6	6
(United States) M Shaughnessy	6^{3}	6	7^{7}
Q	(Argentina) F Labat	7^{7}	1	6^{3}
Q	(Canada) V Webb	6	5	6
4	(Austria) B Schwartz	1	7	4
7	(United States) K Brandi	1	1
(Argentina) P Suárez	6	6
(Bulgaria) L Bacheva	4	1
Q	(United States) J Craybas	6	6
(Argentina) M Díaz Oliva	6	6^{3}	7^{7}
(Bulgaria) P Nola	0	7^{7}	6^{4}
WC	(New Zealand) L Baker	1	6^{3}
2	(Luxembourg) A Kremer	6	7^{7}

Second round
5	(Israel) A Smashnova	5	7^{7}	7^{7}
(Spain) V Ruano Pascual	7	6^{2}	6^{3}
(United States) M Shaughnessy	7^{7}	6
Q	(Canada) V Webb	6^{4}	0
(Argentina) P Suárez	6	6
Q	(United States) J Craybas	2	2
(Argentina) M Díaz Oliva	6^{4}	1
2	(Luxembourg) A Kremer	7^{7}	6

Quarterfinals
5	(Israel) A Smashnova	4	2
(United States) M Shaughnessy	6	6
(Argentina) P Suárez	3	7	4
2	(Luxembourg) A Kremer	6	5	6

Semifinals
(United States) M Shaughnessy	3	3
2	(Luxembourg) A Kremer	6	6
