= 2001 ASB Classic =

- Date: 1–6 January
- Edition: 16th
- Category: Tier V
- Draw: 32S / 16D
- Prize money: $110,000
- Surface: Hard / outdoor
- Location: Auckland, New Zealand
- Venue: ASB Tennis Centre

Champions

Singles
- (United States) Meilen Tu

Doubles
- (France) Alexandra Fusai / (Italy) Rita Grande
← 2000 ·	WTA Auckland Open	· 2002 →

The 2001 ASB Classic was a women's tennis tournament played on outdoor hard courts at the ASB Tennis Centre in Auckland, New Zealand, and was part of Tier V of the 2001 WTA Tour. It was the 16th edition of the tournament and was held from 1 January until 6 January 2001. Unseeded Meilen Tu won the singles title and earned $16,000 first-prize money.

== Finals ==
=== Singles ===
(United States) Meilen Tu defeated (Argentina) Paola Suárez 7–6^{(12–10)}, 6–2

- It was Tu's only title of the year and the 1st of her career.

=== Doubles ===
(France) Alexandra Fusai / (Italy) Rita Grande defeated (Switzerland) Emmanuelle Gagliardi / (Austria) Barbara Schett 7–6^{(7–4)}, 6–3

- It was Fusai's only title of the year and the 12th of her career. It was Grande's 1st title of the year and the 4th of her career.

== WTA entrants ==
=== Seeds ===
Country	Player	Rank^{1}	Seed
FRA	Sandrine Testud	17	1
AUT	Barbara Schett	22	2
FRA	Nathalie Dechy	26	3
USA	Kristina Brandi	27	4
LUX	Anne Kremer	33	5
ARG	Paola Suárez	36	6
ZIM	Cara Black	41	7
USA	Lilia Osterloh	43	8

- Rankings are as of December 25, 2000.

=== Other entrants ===
The following players received wildcards into the singles main draw:

- (New Zealand) Leanne Baker
- (Argentina) María Emilia Salerni

The following players received entry from the qualifying draw:

- (Slovakia) Lenka Dlhopolcova
- (United States) Jill Craybas
- (France) Alexandra Fusai
- (United States) Allison Bradshaw

== See also ==
- 2001 Heineken Open – men's tournament
