= 2001 Internationaux de Strasbourg =

- Date: 21–26 May
- Edition: 15th
- Category: WTA Tier III
- Draw: 30S / 16D
- Prize money: $170,000
- Surface: Clay
- Location: Strasbourg, France
- Venue: Centre Sportif de Hautepierre

Champions

Singles
- (Italy) Silvia Farina Elia

Doubles
- (Italy) Silvia Farina Elia (Uzbekistan) Iroda Tulyaganova
- Internationaux de Strasbourg

The 2001 Internationaux de Strasbourg was a women's tennis tournament played on outdoor clay courts. It was the 15th edition of the Internationaux de Strasbourg, and was part of the Tier III Series of the 2001 WTA Tour. The tournament took place at the Centre Sportif de Hautepierre in Strasbourg, France, from 21 May until 26 May 2001. Eighth-seeded Silvia Farina Elia won the singles title and earned $27,000 first-prize money.

== Finals ==
=== Singles ===
(Italy) Silvia Farina Elia defeated (Germany) Anke Huber 7–5, 0–6, 6–4

- It was Farina Elia's first singles title of her career.

=== Doubles ===
(Italy) Silvia Farina Elia / (Uzbekistan) Iroda Tulyaganova defeated (South Africa) Amanda Coetzer / (United States) Lori McNeil 6–1, 7–6^{(7–0)}
