= 2000 Internationaux de Strasbourg =

- Date: 22–27 May
- Edition: 14th
- Category: WTA Tier III
- Draw: 30S / 16D
- Prize money: $170,000
- Surface: Clay
- Location: Strasbourg, France
- Venue: Centre Sportif de Hautepierre

Champions

Singles
- (Croatia) Silvija Talaja

Doubles
- (Canada) Sonya Jeyaseelan (Argentina) Florencia Labat
- Internationaux de Strasbourg

The 2000 Internationaux de Strasbourg was a women's tennis tournament played on outdoor clay courts. It was the 14th edition of the Internationaux de Strasbourg, and was part of the Tier III Series of the 2000 WTA Tour. The tournament took place at the Centre Sportif de Hautepierre in Strasbourg, France, from 22 May until 27 May 2000. Sixth-seeded Silvija Talaja won the singles title and earned $27,000 first-prize money.

== Finals ==
=== Singles ===
(Croatia) Silvija Talaja defeated (Hungary) Rita Kuti-Kis 7–5, 4–6, 6–3

- It was Talaja's second singles title of the year.

=== Doubles ===
(Canada) Sonya Jeyaseelan / (Argentina) Florencia Labat defeated (South Africa) Kim Grant / (Venezuela) María Vento 6–4, 6–3
