= 2001 Internationaux de Strasbourg – Doubles =

Doubles
- 2001 Internationaux de Strasbourg

Final
- Champions: (Italy) Silvia Farina Elia (Uzbekistan) Iroda Tulyaganova
- Runners-up: (South Africa) Amanda Coetzer (United States) Lori McNeil
- Score: 6–1, 7–6^{(7–0)}

Details
- Draw: 16 (1WC)
- Seeds: 4

Events
Singles	Doubles
← 2000 ·	Internationaux de Strasbourg	· 2002 →

Kim Grant and María Vento were the defending champions, but chose to compete this year with different partners. Grant teamed up with Nannie de Villiers and lost in the quarterfinals to Rika Hiraki and Alicia Molik, while Vento teamed up with Alicia Ortuño and also lost in the quarterfinals to Silvia Farina Elia and Iroda Tulyaganova.

Farina Elia and Tulyaganova won the title by defeating Amanda Coetzer and Lori McNeil 6–1, 7–6^{(7–0)} in the final.

== Seeds ==
1. (United States) Kimberly Po-Messerli / (France) Nathalie Tauziat (semifinals)
2. (France) Mary Pierce / (Japan) Ai Sugiyama (first round)
3. (South Africa) Amanda Coetzer / (United States) Lori McNeil (final)
4. (Italy) Silvia Farina Elia / (Uzbekistan) Iroda Tulyaganova (champions)

== Draw ==
=== Key ===
- Q = Qualifier
- WC = Wild card
- LL = Lucky loser
- Alt = Alternate
- SE = Special exempt
- PR = Protected ranking
- ITF = ITF entry
- JE = Junior exempt
- w/o = Walkover
- r = Retired
- d = Defaulted
- SR = Special ranking

=== Draw ===
First round
1	(United States) K Po-Messerli (France) N Tauziat	6	4	6
(Argentina) E Krauth (Argentina) V Krauth	4	6	4
(Germany) C Schneider (Thailand) T Tanasugarn	6	6
WC	(France) C Pin (France) S Pitkowski	0	3
4	(Italy) S Farina Elia (Uzbekistan) I Tulyaganova	6	7^{7}
(Romania) E Gallovits (Romania) M Mihalache	2	6^{5}
(United States) L Osterloh (Russia) N Petrova
(Spain) A Ortuño (Venezuela) M Vento	w/o
(Germany) M Müller (Luxembourg) C Schaul	6^{1}	6^{1}
(Canada) S Jeyaseelan (Australia) R McQuillan	7^{7}	7^{7}
(Australia) E Dominikovic (Bulgaria) S Krivencheva	6^{6}	6	2
3	(South Africa) A Coetzer (United States) L McNeil	7^{8}	4	6
(Japan) R Hiraki (Australia) A Molik	6	6
(United States) D Buth (United States) J Embry	3	3
(South Africa) N de Villiers (South Africa) K Grant	w/o
2	(France) M Pierce (Japan) A Sugiyama

Quarterfinals
1	(United States) K Po-Messerli (France) N Tauziat	6	6
(Germany) C Schneider (Thailand) T Tanasugarn	3	3
4	(Italy) S Farina Elia (Uzbekistan) I Tulyaganova	7	6
(Spain) A Ortuño (Venezuela) M Vento	5	4
(Canada) S Jeyaseelan (Australia) R McQuillan	6^{12}	2
3	(South Africa) A Coetzer (United States) L McNeil	7^{14}	6
(Japan) R Hiraki (Australia) A Molik	6^{9}	6	6
(South Africa) N de Villiers (South Africa) K Grant	7^{11}	3	4

Semifinals
1	(United States) K Po-Messerli (France) N Tauziat	7	3	2
4	(Italy) S Farina Elia (Uzbekistan) I Tulyaganova	5	6	6
3	(South Africa) A Coetzer (United States) L McNeil	6	6
(Japan) R Hiraki (Australia) A Molik	2	2

Final
4	(Italy) S Farina Elia (Uzbekistan) I Tulyaganova	6	7^{7}
3	(South Africa) A Coetzer (United States) L McNeil	1	6^{0}
