= 2001 Internationaux de Strasbourg – Singles =

Singles
- 2001 Internationaux de Strasbourg

Final
- Champion: (Italy) Silvia Farina Elia
- Runner-up: (Germany) Anke Huber
- Score: 7–5, 0–6, 6–4

Details
- Draw: 30 (2WC/4Q/3LL)
- Seeds: 8

Events
| Singles | Doubles |
| ← 2000 · | Internationaux de Strasbourg | · 2002 → |

Silvija Talaja was the defending champion, but lost in the first round to Anna Smashnova.

Silvia Farina Elia won the title by defeating Anke Huber 7–5, 0–6, 6–4 in the final.

== Seeds ==
The top two seeds received a bye to the second round.

1. (South Africa) Amanda Coetzer (second round)
2. (France) Nathalie Tauziat (semifinals)
3. (France) Mary Pierce (first round)
4. (Germany) Anke Huber (final)
5. (United States) Meghann Shaughnessy (quarterfinals)
6. (Federal Republic of Yugoslavia) ~~Jelena Dokic~~ (withdrew)
7. (Thailand) Tamarine Tanasugarn (first round)
8. (Italy) Silvia Farina Elia (champion)

== Draw ==
=== Key ===
- Q = Qualifier
- WC = Wild card
- LL = Lucky loser
- Alt = Alternate
- SE = Special exempt
- PR = Protected ranking
- ITF = ITF entry
- JE = Junior exempt
- w/o = Walkover
- r = Retired
- d = Defaulted
- SR = Special ranking

=== Finals ===
Semifinals
Q | (France) Céline Beigbeder | 1 | 3
4 | (Germany) Anke Huber | 6 | 6
8 | (Italy) Silvia Farina Elia | 3 | 6 | 6
2 | (France) Nathalie Tauziat | 6 | 4 | 0

Final
4 | (Germany) Anke Huber | 5 | 6 | 4
8 | (Italy) Silvia Farina Elia | 7 | 0 | 6

=== Top half ===
First round
(Japan) A Sugiyama | 6 | 4 | 6
(Italy) ME Camerin | 2 | 6 | 4
Q | (United States) S Cacic | 4 | 6^{2}
LL | (France) S Pitkowski | 6 | 7^{7}
Q | (France) C Beigbeder | 6 | 6
7 | (Thailand) T Tanasugarn | 3 | 2
4 | (Germany) A Huber | 7 | 6
LL | (Germany) M Müller | 5 | 1
WC | (Germany) B Lamade | 3 | 6 | 6
(Switzerland) P Schnyder | 6 | 2 | 3
(Australia) A Molik | 6 | 6
(France) AG Sidot | 3 | 2
(Hungary) R Kuti-Kis | 6 | 6
Q | (France) S Georges | 0 | 3

Second round
1 | (South Africa) A Coetzer | 4 | 4
(Japan) A Sugiyama | 6 | 6
LL | (France) S Pitkowski | 4 | 2
Q | (France) C Beigbeder | 6 | 6
4 | (Germany) A Huber | 6^{4} | 6 | 6
WC | (Germany) B Lamade | 7^{7} | 1 | 2
(Australia) A Molik | 1 | 3
(Hungary) R Kuti-Kis | 6 | 6

Quarterfinals
(Japan) A Sugiyama | 2 | 3
Q | (France) C Beigbeder | 6 | 6
4 | (Germany) A Huber | 6 | 6
(Hungary) R Kuti-Kis | 4 | 4

Semifinals
Q | (France) C Beigbeder | 1 | 3
4 | (Germany) A Huber | 6 | 6

=== Bottom half ===
First round
8 | (Italy) S Farina Elia | 2 | 6 | 7
(Australia) E Dominikovic | 6 | 4 | 5
(Croatia) S Talaja | 2 | 4
(Israel) A Smashnova | 6 | 6
(United States) L Osterloh | 6 | 6
LL | (Luxembourg) C Schaul | 4 | 1
(Uzbekistan) I Tulyaganova | 3 | 6 | 6
3 | (France) M Pierce | 6 | 3 | 1
5 | (United States) M Shaughnessy | 6 | 6
(Australia) R McQuillan | 2 | 2
Q | (Tunisia) S Sfar | 6 | 6
(Germany) J Kandarr | 2 | 1
(United States) M Tu | 6 | 3 | 6
WC | (France) É Loit | 3 | 6 | 3

Second round
8 | (Italy) S Farina Elia | 6 | 6
(Israel) A Smashnova | 1 | 4
(United States) L Osterloh | 6 | 5 | 2
(Uzbekistan) I Tulyaganova | 4 | 7 | 6
5 | (United States) M Shaughnessy | 6 | 6
Q | (Tunisia) S Sfar | 2 | 2
(United States) M Tu | 6 | 3 | 4
2 | (France) N Tauziat | 3 | 6 | 6

Quarterfinals
8 | (Italy) S Farina Elia | 6^{5} | 6 | 6
(Uzbekistan) I Tulyaganova | 7^{7} | 2 | 3
5 | (United States) M Shaughnessy | 7 | 6^{5} | 5
2 | (France) N Tauziat | 5 | 7^{7} | 7

Semifinals
8 | (Italy) S Farina Elia | 3 | 6 | 6
2 | (France) N Tauziat | 6 | 4 | 0
