= 1997 ASB Classic =

- Date: 30 December 1996 – 5 January
- Edition: 12th
- Category: Tier IV
- Draw: 32S / 16D
- Prize money: $107,500
- Surface: Hard / outdoor
- Location: Auckland, New Zealand
- Venue: ASB Tennis Centre

Champions

Singles
- (Austria) Marion Maruska

Doubles
- (Slovakia) Janette Husárová (Belgium) Dominique Van Roost
← 1996 ·	WTA Auckland Open	· 1998 →

The 1997 ASB Classic was a tennis tournament played on outdoor hard courts at the ASB Tennis Centre in Auckland in New Zealand that was part of Tier IV of the 1997 WTA Tour. The tournament was held from 30 December 1996 until 5 January 1997. Qualifier Marion Maruska won the singles title.

== Finals ==
=== Singles ===
(Austria) Marion Maruska defeated (Austria) Judith Wiesner 6–3, 6–1

- It was Maruska's only singles title of her career.

=== Doubles ===
(Slovakia) Janette Husárová / (Belgium) Dominique Van Roost defeated (Poland) Aleksandra Olsza / (Germany) Elena Wagner 6–2, 6–7^{(5–7)}, 6–3

- It was Husárová's only doubles title of the year and the 3rd of her career. It was Van Roost's only doubles title of the year and the 3rd of her career.

== See also ==
- 1997 BellSouth Open – men's tournament
