= 2000 Internationaux de Strasbourg – Singles =

Singles
- 2000 Internationaux de Strasbourg

Final
- Champion: (Croatia) Silvija Talaja
- Runner-up: (Hungary) Rita Kuti-Kis
- Score: 7–5, 4–6, 6–3

Details
- Draw: 30 (2WC/4Q/1LL)
- Seeds: 8

Events
Singles	Doubles
← 1999 ·	Internationaux de Strasbourg	· 2001 →

Jennifer Capriati was the defending champion, but lost in the second round to Rita Kuti-Kis.

Silvija Talaja won the title by defeating Kuti-Kis 7–5, 4–6, 6–3 in the final.

== Seeds ==
The first two seeds received a bye into the second round.

1. (France) Nathalie Tauziat (quarterfinals)
2. (United States) Jennifer Capriati (second round)
3. (Russia) Elena Likhovtseva (first round)
4. (France) Nathalie Dechy (semifinals)
5. (Belgium) Dominique Van Roost (first round)
6. (Croatia) Silvija Talaja (champion)
7. (France) Anne-Gaëlle Sidot (second round)
8. (Luxembourg) Anne Kremer (first round)

== Draw ==
=== Key ===
- Q = Qualifier
- WC = Wild card
- LL = Lucky loser
- Alt = Alternate
- SE = Special exempt
- PR = Protected ranking
- ITF = ITF entry
- JE = Junior exempt
- w/o = Walkover
- r = Retired
- d = Defaulted
- SR = Special ranking

=== Finals ===
Semifinals
6	(Croatia) Silvija Talaja	6	1	6
4	(France) Nathalie Dechy	1	6	3
(Israel) Anna Smashnova	6^{6}	4
(Hungary) Rita Kuti-Kis	7^{8}	6

Final
6	(Croatia) Silvija Talaja	7	4	6
(Hungary) Rita Kuti-Kis	5	6	3

=== Top half ===
First round
(Italy) T Garbin	7	6
WC	(France) S Foretz	5	1
WC	(South Africa) J Kruger	6	2	2
(Canada) J Nejedly	4	6	6
(United States) T Snyder	4	6	3
6	(Croatia) S Talaja	6	4	6
4	(France) N Dechy	6	6
Q	(United States) M Tu	4	2
(Russia) A Myskina	6	7
(Canada) S Jeyaseelan	1	5
(United States) C Morariu	6	6
(France) S Pitkowski	4	2
(Czech Republic) A Gerši	1	1
7	(France) AG Sidot	6	6

Second round
1	(France) N Tauziat	7^{7}	6
(Italy) T Garbin	6^{5}	2
(Canada) J Nejedly	6	2	1
6	(Croatia) S Talaja	3	6	6
4	(France) N Dechy	4	6	6
(Russia) A Myskina	6	2	2
(United States) C Morariu	4	6	6
7	(France) AG Sidot	6	4	0

Quarterfinals
1	(France) N Tauziat	5	2
6	(Croatia) S Talaja	7	6
4	(France) N Dechy	w/o
(United States) C Morariu

Semifinals
6	(Croatia) S Talaja	6	1	6
4	(France) N Dechy	1	6	3

=== Bottom half ===
First round
5	(Belgium) D Van Roost	0	4
(Israel) A Smashnova	6	6
(Belgium) E Callens	6	1	3
(Thailand) T Tanasugarn	3	6	6
(United States) A Stevenson	1	7^{7}	6
(France) A Cocheteux	6	6^{3}	2
Q	(United States) L Osterloh	6	4	6
3	(Russia) E Likhovtseva	3	6	3
8	(Luxembourg) A Kremer	3	6	2^{r}
(Russia) N Petrova	6	2	4
LL	(Slovakia) D Hantuchová	6	6
Q	(Uzbekistan) I Tulyaganova	4	4
(Hungary) R Kuti-Kis	6	6
Q	(France) S Erre	2	2

Second round
(Israel) A Smashnova	6	6
(Thailand) T Tanasugarn	4	2
(United States) A Stevenson	2	1
Q	(United States) L Osterloh	6	6
(Russia) N Petrova	6^{4}	2
LL	(Slovakia) D Hantuchová	7^{7}	6
(Hungary) R Kuti-Kis	6	7^{7}
2	(United States) J Capriati	1	6^{3}

Quarterfinals
(Israel) A Smashnova	7^{8}	6
Q	(United States) L Osterloh	6^{6}	4
LL	(Slovakia) D Hantuchová	4	4
(Hungary) R Kuti-Kis	6	6

Semifinals
(Israel) A Smashnova	6^{6}	4
(Hungary) R Kuti-Kis	7^{8}	6
