= 1996 Amway Classic =

Women's tennis tournament

- Date: 1–6 January
- Edition: 11th
- Category: Tier IV
- Draw: 32S / 16D
- Prize money: $107,500
- Surface: Hard / outdoor
- Location: Auckland, New Zealand
- Venue: ASB Tennis Centre

Champions

Singles
- (United States) Sandra Cacic

Doubles
- (Belgium) Els Callens / (France) Julie Halard-Decugis
← 1995 ·	WTA Auckland Open	· 1997 →

The 1996 Amway Classic was a women's tennis tournament played on outdoor Hard courts at the ASB Tennis Centre in Auckland in New Zealand that was part of Tier IV of the 1996 WTA Tour. It was the 11th edition of the tournament and was held from 1 January until 6 January 1996. Qualifier Sandra Cacic won the singles title.

== Finals ==
=== Singles ===
(United States) Sandra Cacic defeated (Austria) Barbara Paulus 6–3, 1–6, 6–4

- It was Cacic's only singles title of her career.

=== Doubles ===
(Belgium) Els Callens / (France) Julie Halard-Decugis defeated (Canada) Jill Hetherington / (Australia) Kristine Radford 6–1, 6–0

- It was Callens' only doubles title of the year and the 1st of her career. It was Halard-Decugis' only doubles title of the year and the 3rd of her career.

== See also ==
- 1996 BellSouth Open – men's tournament
