= Karin Miller =

American tennis player (born 1977)

- Country (sports): United States
- Born: December 10, 1977 (age 48) Trenton, New Jersey, U.S.
- Height: 1.55 m (5 ft 1 in)
- Plays: Right (two-handed backhand)
- Prize money: $175,843

Singles
- Career record: 205–177
- Career titles: 7 ITF
- Highest ranking: No. 100 (July 6, 1998)

Grand Slam singles results
- Australian Open: 1R (1999)
- Wimbledon: 1R (1998)
- US Open: 1R (1998)

Doubles
- Career record: 117–110
- Career titles: 2 ITF
- Highest ranking: No. 144 (October 18, 1999)

Karin Miller (born December 10, 1977) is a former professional tennis player from the United States.

== Biography ==
=== Early life ===
Born in Trenton, New Jersey, Miller grew up in the Hamilton Square section of Hamilton Township, Mercer County. She was coached by her father Russell growing up. The family moved to Florida in 1985, so Miller could attend the Bollettieri Academy. Small in stature, she stood at five foot one.

=== Tennis career ===
Miller, a right-handed baseliner, attended Duke University as a freshman, before turning professional in 1997.

She made her major main-draw debut at the 1998 Wimbledon Championships as a lucky loser from qualifying, losing her first-round match to Naoko Kijimuta in three sets. Having reached her career highest ranking of world No. 100 following Wimbledon, she made it directly into the main draws of the 1998 US Open and 1999 Australian Open.

At an ITF tournament in Bradenton in 2001, she recorded a win over a young Maria Sharapova. Miller won nine ITF titles (7 in singles) in her career, which ended in 2002.

Settling in Florida, she is the head tennis pro at the Boca Grande Club.

== ITF finals ==
Legend
$50,000 tournaments
$25,000 tournaments
$10,000 tournaments

=== Singles (7–1) ===
Result	No.	Date	Location	Surface	Opponent	Score
Win	1.	28 January 1996	Mission, United States	Hard	(Italy) Elena Savoldi	6–3, 7–5
Win	2.	4 August 1996	Roanoke, United States	Hard	(Argentina) María José Gaidano	1–6, 6–4, 6–0
Loss	1.	13 July 1997	Easton, United States	Hard	(South Africa) Nannie de Villiers	3–6, 3–6
Win	3.	20 July 1997	Clearwater, United States	Hard	(Canada) Maureen Drake	6–3, 7–6
Win	4.	3 August 1997	Lexington, United States	Hard	(South Africa) Liezel Horn	6–7, 6–1, 6–2
Win	5.	23 November 1997	Port Pirie, Australia	Hard	(United States) Jean Okada	4–6, 6–1, 7–6
Win	6.	22 November 1998	Port Pirie, Australia	Hard	(Canada) Vanessa Webb	6–2, 7–6
Win	7.	29 November 1998	Nuriootpa, Australia	Hard	(Australia) Amanda Grahame	6–2, 6–2

=== Doubles (2–7) ===
Result	No.	Date	Location	Surface	Partner	Opponents	Score
Loss	1.	12 July 1997	Easton, US	Hard	(United States) Marissa Catlin	(South Africa) Nannie de Villiers (Australia) Lisa McShea	0–6, 6–3, 2–6
Loss	2.	31 January 1998	Clearwater, US	Hard	(United States) Kristina Brandi	(Canada) Maureen Drake (Canada) Renata Kolbovic	6–4, 3–6, 4–6
Loss	3.	30 January 1999	Clearwater, US	Hard	(United States) Jean Okada	(Slovenia) Katarina Srebotnik (Slovakia) Zuzana Váleková	2–6, 0–6
Loss	4.	18 July 1999	Mahwah, US	Hard	(United States) Sandra Cacic	(United States) Dawn Buth (Canada) Vanessa Webb	4–6, 3–6
Loss	5.	20 May 2000	Jackson, US	Clay	(South Africa) Jessica Steck	(Brazil) Joana Cortez (Brazil) Miriam D'Agostini	4–6, 7–5, 1–6
Win	1.	10 June 2001	Hilton Head, US	Hard	(United States) Kirsty Blumberg	(South Korea) Choi Young-ja (South Korea) Jeon Mi-ra	6–4, 7–6^{(7–1)}
Loss	6.	24 June 2001	Easton, US	Hard	(United States) Kirsty Blumberg	(South Korea) Choi Young-ja (South Korea) Jeon Mi-ra	1–6, 1–6
Loss	7.	10 November 2001	Pittsburgh, US	Hard (i)	(United States) Mashona Washington	(United States) Lilia Osterloh (United States) Katie Schlukebir	1–6, 4–6
Win	2.	26 January 2002	Miami, US	Hard	(United States) Stephanie Mabry	(Hungary) Melinda Czink (Haiti) Neyssa Etienne	6–4, 6–7^{(5–7)}, 6–2
