= Barbara Schwartz (tennis) =

Austrian tennis player

- Country (sports): Austria
- Residence: Brunn am Gebirge, Austria
- Born: 27 January 1979 (age 46) Austria
- Height: 1.8 m (5 ft 11 in)
- Turned pro: 1999
- Retired: November 2006
- Plays: Left-handed
- Prize money: $510,141

Singles
- Career record: 198–142
- Career titles: 0 WTA, 6 ITF
- Highest ranking: No. 40 (8 November 1999)

Grand Slam singles results
- Australian Open: 3R (2003)
- French Open: QF (1999)
- Wimbledon: 3R (2001)
- US Open: 3R (2001)

Doubles
- Career record: 67–61
- Career titles: 2 WTA, 6 ITF
- Highest ranking: No. 106 (10 January 2000)

Team competitions
- Fed Cup: 9–8

Barbara Schwartz (German pronunciation: [Barbara ʃvarts]; born 27 January 1979) is an Austrian former professional tennis player.

She turned professional in 1995 at the age of 16, and reached a career-high WTA ranking of 40 in November 1999, after reaching the quarterfinals at the Roland Garros that year, her best performance in a Grand Slam event.

Schwartz was unranked on the computer at the end of 2005. She retired from the tour in November 2006.

== WTA career finals ==
=== Doubles: 4 (2 titles, 2 runner-ups) ===
Legend
Grand Slam tournaments
Tier I
Tier II
Tier III, IV & V (2–2)

Result	Date	Tournament	Surface	Partner	Opponents	Score
Loss	Jan 2000	Auckland Open, New Zealand	Hard	(Austria) Patricia Wartusch	(Zimbabwe) Cara Black (France) Alexandra Fusai	6–3, 3–6, 4–6
Loss	Jun 2002	Vienna Open, Austria	Clay	(Germany) Jasmin Wöhr	(Hungary) Petra Mandula (Austria) Patricia Wartusch	6–2, 0–6, 6–4
Win	Jul 2002	Brussels, Belgium	Clay	(Germany) Jasmin Wöhr	(Italy) Tathiana Garbin (Spain) Arantxa Sánchez Vicario	6–2, 0–6, 6–4
Win	Feb 2004	Copa Colsanitas, Colombia	Clay	(Germany) Jasmin Wöhr	(Spain) Anabel Medina Garrigues (Spain) Arantxa Parra Santonja	6–1, 6–3

== ITF finals ==
Legend
$100,000 tournaments
$75,000 tournaments
$50,000 tournaments
$25,000 tournaments
$10,000 tournaments

=== Singles (6–2) ===
Results	No.	Date	Tournament	Surface	Opponent	Score
Win	1.	8 May 1995	ITF Bossonnens, Switzerland	Clay	(Spain) Conchita Martínez Granados	3–6, 6–1, 6–3
Loss	2.	26 May 1996	ITF Novi Sad, Yugoslavia	Clay	(Slovenia) Barbara Mulej	5–7, 6–4, 4–6
Win	3.	24 August 1997	ITF Kyiv, Ukraine	Clay	(Argentina) María Fernanda Landa	6–3, 6–2
Loss	4.	29 September 1997	ITF Otočec, Slovenia	Clay	(Spain) Ana Alcázar	3–6, 2–6
Win	5.	2 November 1997	ITF Edinburgh, United Kingdom	Hard (i)	(Serbia and Montenegro) Sandra Načuk	3–6, 6–3, 6–4
Win	6.	12 April 1998	Estoril Open, Portugal	Clay	(Romania) Raluca Sandu	6–2, 6–3
Win	7.	15 November 1998	ITF Hull, United Kingdom	Hard (i)	(Italy) Francesca Lubiani	3–6, 6–3, 6–2
Win	8.	19 August 2001	Bronx Open, United States	Hard	(Germany) Martina Müller	5–7, 6–3, 7–6^{(7–3)}

=== Doubles (6–0) ===
Results	No.	Date	Tournament	Surface	Partner	Opponents	Score
Win	1.	27 November 1995	ITF Salzburg, Austria	Carpet (i)	(Austria) Evelyn Fauth	(Czech Republic) Milena Nekvapilová (Czech Republic) Sylva Nesvadbová	6–7^{(1–7)}, 7–6^{(8–6)}, 6–3
Win	2.	6 October 1996	ITF Lerida, Spain	Clay	(Germany) Kirstin Freye	(Netherlands) Amanda Hopmans (Belgium) Patty Van Acker	6–2, 6–1
Win	3.	17 November 1996	ITF Bad Gögging, Germany	Carpet (i)	(India) Nirupama Sanjeev	(Germany) Kirstin Freye (Germany) Silke Meier	6–4, 6–1
Win	4.	16 February 1997	ITF Rogaska Slatina, Slovenia	Carpet (i)	(Austria) Patricia Wartusch	(Israel) Hila Rosen (Serbia and Montenegro) Dragana Zarić	6–1, 6–4
Win	5.	15 November 1998	ITF Hull, United Kingdom	Hard (i)	(Germany) Jasmin Wöhr	(Italy) Francesca Lubiani (Italy) Maria Paola Zavagli	6–2, 6–3
Win	6.	7 July 2002	ITF Stuttgart, Germany	Clay	(Germany) Jasmin Wöhr	(Belarus) Darya Kustova (Slovenia) Petra Rampre	5–7, 6–4, 7–6^{(7–4)}
