= Marion Maruska =

Austrian tennis player

- Country (sports): Austria
- Residence: Hinterbrühl, Austria
- Born: 15 December 1972 (age 53) Mödling, Austria
- Height: 1.72 m (5 ft 7 1/2 in)
- Turned pro: 1992
- Retired: 2001
- Plays: Right-handed (two-handed backhand)
- Prize money: $342,007

Singles
- Career record: 231-208
- Career titles: 1 WTA, 4 ITF
- Highest ranking: No. 50 (6 October 1997)

Grand Slam singles results
- Australian Open: 1R (1992, 1998)
- French Open: 2R (1998)
- Wimbledon: 2R (1997)
- US Open: 1R (1991, 1997)

Doubles
- Career record: 66–94
- Career titles: 0 WTA, 3 ITF
- Highest ranking: No. 123 (24 July 2000)

Marion Maruska (born 15 December 1972) is an Austrian former tennis player. She turned professional in 1992 and reached her career-high singles ranking on October 6, 1997, when she became the No. 50 of the world.

1997 was Maruska's best year on the WTA Tour, highlighted by her first (and only) WTA title and another tour final amid a wave of inconsistent results. As the world No. 154, she won her debut WTA title at the ASB Classic held in Auckland, New Zealand. En route, she beat Anke Huber for her first top-ten win. At Wimbledon, she won her first ever Grand Slam main-draw match when she beat Adriana Gerši, before falling to recently crowned French Open champion Iva Majoli. At the ECM Prague Open, she made her second tour final, but this time failed to walk away with the title.

1998 was a poor year for Maruska in comparison. She reached the second round of the French Open but had few other results and fell out of the top 100, subsequently never reaching her level of one year ago again.

She played much of her career on the ITF circuit, where she won four singles titles and three doubles titles.

Maruska represented Austria in Fed Cup five times: 1997, 1997, and 2000–2002. She earned a 2–6 record in those ties.

In 2001, she played her last professional singles match, at the US Open, losing to Nathalie Viérin in the first round of qualifying. Her final career match, however, was a Fed Cup doubles loss to the American team of Lisa Raymond and Monica Seles.

== WTA career finals ==
=== Singles (1–1) ===
Grand Slam
Tier I
Tier II
Tier III
Tier IV-V (1-1)

Result	W/L	Date	Tournament	Surface	Opponent	Score
Win	1–0	Jan 1997	Auckland, New Zealand	Hard	(Austria) Judith Wiesner	6–3, 6–1
Loss	1–1	Jul 1997	Prague, Czech Republic	Clay	(South Africa) Joannette Kruger	1–6, 1–6

=== Doubles (0–1) ===
Grand Slam
Tier I
Tier II
Tier III
Tier IV-V (0-1)

Result	W/L	Date	Tournament	Surface	Partner	Opponents	Score
Loss	0–1	May 1997	Bol, Croatia	Clay	(Argentina) María José Gaidano	(Argentina) Laura Montalvo (Slovakia) Henrieta Nagyová	3–6, 1–6

== ITF finals ==
=== Singles (4–4) ===
$100,000 tournaments
$75,000 tournaments
$50,000 tournaments
$25,000 tournaments
$10,000 tournaments

Result	No.	Date	Tournament	Surface	Opponent	Score
Loss	1.	21 November 1988	Wels, Austria	Clay (i)	(Czech Republic) Eva Švíglerová	3–6, 1–6
Win	2.	4 March 1990	Wels, Austria	Clay	(Luxembourg) Karin Kschwendt	3–6, 6–1, 6–4
Win	3.	29 June 1992	Ronneby, Sweden	Clay	(Sweden) Åsa Carlsson	4–6, 6–1, 6–2
Loss	4.	7 February 1994	Sunderland, England	Carpet (i)	(Netherlands) Gaby Coorengel	2–6, 5–7
Loss	5.	20 February 1994	Newcastle, England	Carpet (i)	(Netherlands) Linda Niemantsverdriet	6–7, 4–6
Loss	6.	27 March 1995	Reims, France	Clay	(Italy) Flora Perfetti	4–6, 6–2, 5–7
Win	7.	17 April 1995	Plovdiv, Bulgaria	Clay	(South Africa) Mareze Joubert	6–0, 6–4
Win	8.	1 April 2001	Stone Mountain, United States	Hard	(Australia) Alicia Molik	6–3, 6–3

=== Doubles (3–2) ===
Result	No.	Date	Tournament	Surface	Partner	Opponents	Score
Win	1.	24 October 1988	Linz, Austria	Hard (i)	(Austria) Petra Ritter	(Switzerland) Cristina Casini (Poland) Katarzyna Nowak	6–3, 6–4
Win	2.	9 April 1989	Bari, Italy	Clay	(Bulgaria) Elena Pampoulova	(Hungary) Andrea Noszály (West Germany) Eva-Maria Schürhoff	w/o
Win	3.	16 June 1991	Mantua, Italy	Clay	(Spain) Virginia Ruano Pascual	(Japan) Yone Kamio (Japan) Hiromi Nagano	3–6, 6–4, 6–3
Loss	4.	11 February 1996	Mar del Plata, Argentina	Hard	(France) Noëlle van Lottum	(Argentina) Laura Montalvo (Argentina) Paola Suárez	3–6, 1–6
Loss	5.	10 October 1999	Albuquerque, United States	Hard	(India) Nirupama Sanjeev	(United States) Debbie Graham (Japan) Nana Smith	4–6, 5–7
