= Silvia Farina Elia =

Italian tennis player

Silvia Farina-Elia
- Country (sports): Italy
- Residence: Rome
- Born: 27 April 1972 (age 53) Milan
- Height: 1.72 m (5 ft 7 1/2 in)
- Turned pro: 1988
- Retired: 24 October 2005
- Plays: Right-handed (one-handed backhand)
- Prize money: $3,688,252

Singles
- Career record: 469–370
- Career titles: 3
- Highest ranking: No. 11 (20 May 2002)

Grand Slam singles results
- Australian Open: 4R (2004, 2005)
- French Open: 4R (2001, 2002)
- Wimbledon: QF (2003)
- US Open: 4R (2002)

Other tournaments
- Tour Finals: 1R (2001, 2002)
- Olympic Games: 3R (2000)

Doubles
- Career record: 269–255
- Career titles: 9
- Highest ranking: No. 24 (21 June 1999)

Grand Slam doubles results
- Australian Open: 3R (1997)
- French Open: QF (1994, 1998, 2004)
- Wimbledon: QF (1998, 1999)
- US Open: 3R (1994, 1999, 2005)

Other doubles tournaments
- Olympic Games: 2R (2004)

Silvia Farina-Elia (Italian pronunciation: [ˈsilvja faˈriːna eˈliːa]; born 27 April 1972) is a former professional tennis player from Italy. She won three WTA singles titles, reached the quarterfinals of the 2003 Wimbledon Championships and achieved a career-high singles ranking of world No. 11 in May 2002. Farina-Elia won her first ITF title at Caltagirone in 1991 and her first WTA tournament at Strasbourg in 2001. She made her debut Grand Slam appearance at the 1991 French Open and was coached by husband Francesco Elia, whom she married September 1999.

== Career ==
Farina-Elia made steady progression on the ITF circuit during the early 1990s and finished her first year in the top 100 in 1991. She completed her first victory over a top ten player (Gabriela Sabatini, Roland Garros) in 1994 and won her first doubles title the next year. In 1996, she represented Italy at the Atlanta Olympics. 1998 was considered her breakthrough year, reaching the final of four tournaments and in the process securing a place in the year end top 20. She was 26 at the time and thus considered a "late bloomer". She only reached one singles final in 1999 but made a greater impact in doubles, winning three tournaments.

In 2001, Farina-Elia won a belated first WTA Tour title, at the Internationaux de Strasbourg. She ended the year No. 14, what was to be her best year end finish and played in the WTA Tour Championships of 2001 and 2002. She consolidated the Strasbourg win with two more wins at the tournament. In 2003, she achieved her best Grand Slam result at the unlikely venue of Wimbledon, home of her least favourite surface, losing to Kim Clijsters, 7–5, 0–6, 1–6 in the quarterfinals.

Farina-Elia represented Italy at nine Federation Cups and also at three Olympics.

On Monday 24 October 2005, she announced her retirement from the tour due a recurrence of a shoulder injury, saying, "My body has given all it can."

== Personal life ==
Farina-Elia began playing tennis aged 10; introduced to the sport by her mother, who played recreationally. Her parents are both insurance agents, as is her sister, Olga. Her brother, Enrico, restores furniture. She married Francesco Elia on 22 September 1999 and described the prospect of life after tennis as "exciting".

== WTA career finals ==
=== Singles: 13 (3 titles, 10 runner-ups) ===
Legend
Grand Slam (0)
Tier I (0)
Tier II (0)
Tier III (3)
Tier IV-V (0)

Result	W-L	Date	Tournament	Date	Opponent	Score
Loss	0–1	Jul 1991	San Marino Open	Clay	(Italy) Katia Piccolini	2–6, 3–6
Loss	0–2	Jan 1998	Auckland, New Zealand	Hard	(Belgium) Dominique van Roost	6–4, 6–7^{(9–11)}, 5–7
Loss	0–3	Apr 1998	Budapest, Hungary	Clay	(Spain) Virginia Ruano Pascual	4–6, 6–6, 3–6
Loss	0–4	Jul 1998	Warsaw Open, Poland	Clay	(Spain) Conchita Martínez	0–6, 3–6
Loss	0–5	Nov 1998	Luxembourg Open	Carpet (i)	(France) Mary Pierce	0–6, 0–2 ret.
Loss	0–6	Feb 1999	Prostějov, Czech Republic	Carpet (i)	(Slovakia) Henrieta Nagyová	6–7^{(2–7)}, 4–6
Loss	0–7	Jan 2001	Gold Coast, Australia	Hard	(Belgium) Justine Henin	6–7^{(5–7)}, 4–6
Win	1–7	May 2001	Strasbourg, France	Clay	(Germany) Anke Huber	7–5, 0–6, 6–4
Win	2–7	May 2002	Strasbourg, France	Clay	(Federal Republic of Yugoslavia) Jelena Dokić	6–4, 3–6, 6–3
Win	3–7	May 2003	Strasbourg, France	Clay	(Croatia) Karolina Šprem	6–3, 4–6, 6–4
Loss	3–8	Jan 2004	Canberra, Australia	Hard	(Argentina) Paola Suárez	6–3, 4–6, 6–7^{(5–7)}
Loss	3–9	Feb 2004	Antwerp, Belgium	Hard (i)	(Belgium) Kim Clijsters	3–6, 0–6
Loss	3–10	Apr 2005	Amelia Island, United States	Clay	(United States) Lindsay Davenport	5–7, 5–7

=== Doubles: 17 (9 titles, 8 runner-ups) ===
Result	W-L	Date	Tournament	Surface	Partner	Opponents	Score
Loss	0–1	May 1990	Taranto Trophy, Italy	Clay	(Italy) Rita Grande	(Soviet Union) Elena Brioukhovets (Soviet Union) Eugenia Maniokova	6–7, 1–6
Loss	0–2	Jul 1993	Palermo, Italy	Clay	(Netherlands) Brenda Schultz	(Austria) Karin Kschwendt (Ukraine) Natalia Medvedeva	4–6, 6–7^{(4–7)}
Win	1–2	Jul 1995	Maria Lankowitz, Austria	Clay	(Hungary) Andrea Temesvári	(France) Alexandra Fusai (Germany) Wiltrud Probst	6–2, 6–2
Loss	1–3	Nov 1996	Kremlin Cup, Russia	Carpet (i)	(Austria) Barbara Schett	(Ukraine) Natalia Medvedeva (Latvia) Larisa Savchenko	6–7^{(5–7)}, 6–4, 1–6
Loss	1–4	Jan 1997	Gold Coast, Australia	Hard	(Romania) Ruxandra Dragomir	(Japan) Naoko Kijimuta (Japan) Nana Miyagi	7–6, 6–1
Win	2–4	Jul 1997	Palermo, Italy	Clay	(Austria) Barbara Schett	(Argentina) Florencia Labat (Argentina) Mercedes Paz	2–6, 6–1, 6–4
Win	3–4	Jul 1998	Prague, Czech Republic	Clay	(Czech Republic) Karina Habšudová	(Czech Republic) Květa Hrdličková (Czech Republic) Michaela Paštiková	2–6, 6–1, 6–2
Win	4–4	Jan 1999	Auckland, New Zealand	Hard	(Austria) Barbara Schett	(Netherlands) Seda Noorlander (Germany) Marlene Weingärtner	6–2, 7–6
Win	5–4	Jun 1999	Rosmalen Open, Netherlands	Grass	(Italy) Rita Grande	(Zimbabwe) Cara Black (Netherlands) Kristie Boogert	7–5, 7–6
Win	6–4	Jul 1999	Pörtschach, Austria	Clay	(Czech Republic) Karina Habšudová	(Ukraine) Olga Lugina (Argentina) Laura Montalvo	6–4, 6–4
Loss	6–5	Feb 2000	Hanover, Germany	Hard (i)	(Czech Republic) Karina Habšudová	(Sweden) Åsa Carlsson (Belarus) Natalia Zvereva	3–6, 4–6
Win	7–5	Jul 2000	Palermo, Italy	Clay	(Italy) Rita Grande	(Romania) Ruxandra Dragomir (Spain) Virginia Ruano Pascual	6–4, 0–6, 7–6^{(8–6)}
Win	8–5	May 2001	Strasbourg, France	Clay	(Uzbekistan) Iroda Tulyaganova	(South Africa) Amanda Coetzer (United States) Lori McNeil	6–1, 7–6^{(7–0)}
Loss	8–6	Oct 2003	Linz, Austria	Hard (i)	(France) Marion Bartoli	(South Africa) Liezel Huber (Japan) Ai Sugiyama	1–6, 6–7^{(6–8)}
Loss	8–7	Feb 2004	Paris, France	Hard	(Italy) Francesca Schiavone	(Austria) Barbara Schett (Switzerland) Patty Schnyder	3–6, 2–6
Win	9–7	May 2004	Warsaw, Poland	Clay	(Italy) Francesca Schiavone	(Argentina) Gisela Dulko (Argentina) Patricia Tarabini	3–6, 6–2, 6–1
Loss	9–8	Jan 2005	Gold Coast, Australia	Hard	(Italy) Maria Elena Camerin	(Russia) Elena Likhovtseva (Bulgaria) Magdalena Maleeva	6–3, 5–7, 6–1

== ITF finals ==
=== Singles (2–1) ===
Legend
$100,000 tournaments
$75,000 tournaments
$50,000 tournaments
$25,000 tournaments
$10,000 tournaments

Result	No.	Date	Tournament	Surface	Opponent	Score
Loss	1.	29 October 1990	ITF Putignano, Italy	Clay	(Italy) Nathalie Baudone	2–6, 4–6
Win	2.	24 June 1991	ITF Caltagirone, Italy	Clay	(Belgium) Ann Devries	7–5, 6–3
Win	3.	5 April 1993	ITF Limoges, France	Carpet (i)	(Belgium) Laurence Courtois	6–3, 6–3

=== Doubles (6–2) ===
Result	No	Date	Tournament	Surface	Partner	Opponents	Score
Win	1.	11 June 1990	ITF Modena, Italy	Hard	(Italy) Simona Isidori	(Netherlands) Heleen van den Berg (Netherlands) Miriam Oremans	6–2, 6–3
Win	2.	23 July 1990	ITF Milan, Italy	Hard	(Italy) Simona Isidori	(France) Nathalie Ballet (France) Agnes Romand	2–6, 6–1, 6–3
Win	3.	29 October 1990	ITF Putignano, Italy	Clay	(Italy) Nathalie Baudone	(Socialist Federal Republic of Yugoslavia) Darija Dešković (Socialist Federal Republic of Yugoslavia) Karin Lušnic	6–1, 6–1
Win	4.	24 June 1991	ITF Caltagiron, Italy	Hard	(Japan) Misumi Miyauchi	(France) Alexandra Fusai (France) Olivia Gravereaux	6–7, 6–4, 6–4
Win	5.	13 April 1992	ITF Salerno, Italy	Hard	(Italy) Linda Ferrando	(Australia) Kirrily Sharpe (Australia) Angie Woolcock	6–1, 6–4
Loss	6.	7 September 1992	ITF Arzachena, Italy	Clay	(Italy) Linda Ferrando	(Italy) Laura Garrone (Italy) Laura Golarsa	4–6, 6–4, 4–6
Win	7.	11 April 1993	ITF Limoges, France	Carpet (i)	(Bulgaria) Elena Pampoulova	(United States) Stephanie Reece (United States) Danielle Scott	6–2, 6–7^{(5)}, 6–2
Loss	8.	16 August 1993	ITF Arzachena, Italy	Clay	(Italy) Linda Ferrando	(Japan) Akiko Kijimuta (Japan) Naoko Kijimuta	0–6, 5–7

== Head-to-head record against players in the top 10 ==
Players who have been ranked world No. 1 are in boldface.

- Dominique Monami 1–4
- **Martina Hingis** 1–4
- **Lindsay Davenport** 1–7
- **Dinara Safina** 0–2
- **Arantxa Sánchez Vicario** 0–5
- **Serena Williams** 1–1
- **Maria Sharapova** 1–1
- **Justine Henin** 0–3
- **Kim Clijsters** 0–6
- **Amélie Mauresmo** 0–7
- **Jelena Janković** 2–1
- Elena Dementieva 1–3
- Iva Majoli 0–4
- Jana Novotná 1–5
- Anna Kournikova 3–4
- Flavia Pennetta 1–0
- Nadia Petrova 0–4
- Karina Habšudová 2-1
