= Alexandra Fusai =

French tennis player (born 1973)

- Country (sports): France
- Born: 22 November 1973 (age 52) Saint-Cloud, France
- Height: 1.76 m (5 ft 9 in)
- Turned pro: September 1989
- Retired: April 2003
- Plays: Right-handed (two-handed backhand)
- Prize money: $1,608,170

Singles
- Career record: 284–269
- Career titles: 6 ITF
- Highest ranking: No. 37 (26 October 1998)

Grand Slam singles results
- Australian Open: 3R (1996)
- French Open: 3R (1994, 1998)
- Wimbledon: 2R (1996, 1998)
- US Open: 3R (1997)

Doubles
- Career record: 300–225
- Career titles: 12 WTA, 2 ITF
- Highest ranking: No. 6 (14 September 1998)

Grand Slam doubles results
- Australian Open: QF (2001)
- French Open: SF (1997, 1999, 2000)
- Wimbledon: 3R (1997)
- US Open: QF (1997)

Team competitions
- Fed Cup: W (1997)

Alexandra Fusai (born 22 November 1973) is a former professional tennis player from France.

Fusai was born in Saint-Cloud, Hauts-de-Seine. Starting from September 1989 when she turned professional, Fusai played four tournaments (all of them part of the ITF Women's Circuit) on the international tennis circuit in 1989. She played right-handed and lived in Nantes during her career. She retired from the professional tennis circuit in April 2003 when she discovered that she was pregnant with her first child. Fusai's highest WTA rankings were No. 37 and No. 6 respectively, both attained in 1998. Her career prize money earnings reached the one million USD-mark in 1999.

Fusai won six singles titles on the ITF Women's Circuit. She reached her only career WTA Tour singles final in Warsaw in 1995, losing to Barbara Paulus of Austria in three sets. She was a losing singles quarterfinalist on six occasions and a losing singles semifinalist on three occasions in WTA tournaments. Fusai never advanced beyond the singles third round of the main draw of any Grand Slam tournament. She earned her career-best singles victory at the Italian Open in Rome in 1998 by beating world No. 3 Jana Novotná.

Fusai excelled as a doubles player. She achieved her best results in doubles competition in partnership with fellow Frenchwoman Nathalie Tauziat from 1997 to 2000. She was a losing quarterfinalist on four occasions and a losing semifinalist on three occasions in seven Grand Slam women's doubles tournaments; in five of those tournaments, her doubles partner was Tauziat. Fusai's doubles performances qualified her to play in the year-ending WTA Tour Championships in 1997, 1998, 1999, 2000. and 2001; her doubles partner was Tauziat in the 1997, 1998, 1999 and 2000 editions of the WTA Tour Championships. She and Tauziat were the runners-up there in 1997 and 1998. All in all, Fusai won a total of 12 WTA Tour doubles titles, eight of them with Tauziat. She was the doubles runner-up in WTA Tour tournaments on 21 occasions, eleven of them with Tauziat. Fusai was a losing doubles semifinalist in WTA tournaments on 27 occasions, excluding Grand Slam tournaments: 1992(1), 1993(1), 1994(1), 1995(2), 1996(1), 1997(3), 1998(4), 1999(4), 2000(3), 2001(6), 2003(1). Fusai had a career women's doubles win–loss record of 300–225 (260–192 for only main draw matches in WTA Tour tournaments).

Fusai achieved her best mixed-doubles result at the 2001 French Open; she was paired with Jérôme Golmard and they lost in the quarterfinals. Fusai was a member of the France Fed Cup team that won the title in 1997, winning all three World Group doubles matches that she played from the opening round (quarterfinals) against Japan to the final against the Netherlands. She also played for her country in the Fed Cup in 1994 and 1998. She had a Fed Cup career record of 1–1 in singles and 5–1 in doubles. However, Fusai did not play for her country in the Olympic Games.

Fusai married David Crochu on 13 July 2002. Their son Oscar was born on 7 December 2003, and their daughter Léna was born on 27 June 2007.

== WTA career finals ==
=== Singles (0–1) ===
Finals by surface
Grand Slam (0)
Tier I (1)
Tier II (3)
Tier III (3)
Tier IV & V (5)

Result	W/L	Date	Tournament	Surface	Opponent	Score
Loss	0–1	Sep 1995	Warsaw, Poland	Clay	(Austria) Barbara Paulus	6–7^{(4–7)}, 6–4, 1–6

=== Doubles (12–21) ===
Finals by surface
Grand Slam (0)
Tier I (0)
Tier II (0)
Tier III (0)
Tier IV & V (0)

Result	W/L	Date	Tournament	Surface	Partner	Opponents	Score
Loss	0–1	Jul 1994	Maria Lankowitz, Austria	Clay	(Slovakia) Karina Habšudová	(Italy) Sandra Cecchini (Argentina) Patricia Tarabini	5–7, 5–7
Loss	0–2	Nov 1994	Taipei, Taiwan	Hard	(Belgium) Nancy Feber	(Australia) Michelle Jaggard-Lai (Canada) Rene Simpson	0–6, 6–7^{(10–12)}
Loss	0–3	Jul 1995	Maria Lankowitz, Austria	Clay	(Germany) Wiltrud Probst	(Italy) Silvia Farina (Hungary) Andrea Temesvári	2–6, 2–6
Loss	0–4	May 1996	Bol, Croatia	Clay	(France) Alexia Dechaume	(Argentina) Laura Montalvo (Argentina) Paola Suárez	7–6, 3–6, 4–6
Loss	0–5	Sep 1996	Warsaw, Poland	Clay	(Italy) Laura Garrone	(Ukraine) Olga Lugina (Bulgaria) Elena Pampoulova	6–1, 4–6, 5–7
Win	1–5	Oct 1996	Surabaya, Indonesia	Hard	(Australia) Kerry-Anne Guse	(Slovenia) Tina Križan (France) Noëlle van Lottum	6–4, 6–4
Loss	1–6	Feb 1997	Paris, France	Carpet (i)	(Italy) Rita Grande	(Czech Republic) Jana Novotná (Switzerland) Martina Hingis	3–6, 0–6
Win	2–6	Feb 1997	Linz, Austria	Carpet (i)	(France) Nathalie Tauziat	(Czech Republic) Eva Melicharová (Czech Republic) Helena Vildová	4–6, 6–3, 6–1
Win	3–6	Apr 1997	Budapest, Hungary	Clay	(South Africa) Amanda Coetzer	(Czech Republic) Eva Martincová (Germany) Elena Wagner	6–3, 6–1
Loss	3–76	Aug 1997	Atlanta, US	Hard	(France) Nathalie Tauziat	(United States) Nicole Arendt (Netherlands) Manon Bollegraf	7–6^{(7–5)}, 3–6, 2–6
Loss	3–8	Oct 1997	Québec City, Canada	Carpet (i)	(France) Nathalie Tauziat	(United States) Lisa Raymond (Australia) Rennae Stubbs	4–6, 7–5, 5–7
Win	4–8	Nov 1997	Chicago, US	Carpet (i)	(France) Nathalie Tauziat	(United States) Lindsay Davenport (United States) Monica Seles	6–3, 6–2
Loss	4–9	Nov 1997	New York, US	Carpet (i)	(France) Nathalie Tauziat	(United States) Lindsay Davenport (Czech Republic) Jana Novotná	7–6^{(7–5)}, 3–6, 2–6
Win	5–9	Feb 1998	Linz, Austria	Carpet (i)	(France) Nathalie Tauziat	(Russia) Anna Kournikova (Latvia) Larisa Neiland	6–3, 3–6, 6–4
Loss	5–10	Mar 1998	Indian Wells, US	Hard	(France) Nathalie Tauziat	(United States) Lindsay Davenport (Belarus) Natasha Zvereva	4–6, 6–2, 4–6
Loss	5–11	May 1998	Berlin, Germany	Clay	(France) Nathalie Tauziat	(United States) Lindsay Davenport (Belarus) Natasha Zvereva	3–6, 0–6
Win	6–11	May 1998	Strasbourg, France	Clay	(France) Nathalie Tauziat	(Indonesia) Yayuk Basuki (Netherlands) Caroline Vis	6–4, 6–3
Loss	6–12	Aug 1998	San Diego, US	Hard	(France) Nathalie Tauziat	(United States) Lindsay Davenport (Belarus) Natasha Zvereva	2–6, 1–6
Win	7–12	Aug 1998	New Haven, US	Hard	(France) Nathalie Tauziat	(Czech Republic) Jana Novotná (South Africa) Mariaan de Swardt	6–1, 6–0
Loss	7–13	Nov 1998	New York, US	Carpet (i)	(France) Nathalie Tauziat	(United States) Lindsay Davenport (Belarus) Natasha Zvereva	7–6^{(8–6)}, 5–7, 3–6
Win	8–13	Feb 1999	Prostějov, Czech Republic	Carpet (i)	(France) Nathalie Tauziat	(Czech Republic) Květa Peschke (Czech Republic) Helena Vildová	3–6, 6–2, 6–1
Loss	8–14	Feb 1999	Hanover, Germany	Carpet (i)	(France) Nathalie Tauziat	(United States) Serena Williams (United States) Venus Williams	7–5, 2–6, 2–6
Loss	8–15	May 1999	Rome, Italy	Clay	(France) Nathalie Tauziat	(Switzerland) Martina Hingis (Russia) Anna Kournikova	2–6, 2–6
Win	9–15	May 1999	Berlin, Germany	Clay	(France) Nathalie Tauziat	(Czech Republic) Jana Novotná (Argentina) Patricia Tarabini	6–3, 7–5
Loss	9–16	May 1999	Strasbourg, France	Clay	(France) Nathalie Tauziat	(Russia) Elena Likhovtseva (Japan) Ai Sugiyama	6–2, 6–7^{(6–8)}, 1–6
Loss	9–17	Jun 1999	Birmingham, England	Grass	(Argentina) Inés Gorrochategui	(United States) Corina Morariu (Latvia) Larisa Neiland	4–6, 4–6
Win	10–17	Jan 2000	Auckland, New Zealand	Hard	(Zimbabwe) Cara Black	(Austria) Barbara Schwartz (Austria) Patricia Wartusch	3–6, 6–3, 6–4
Loss	10–18	Feb 2000	Tokyo, Japan	Carpet (i)	(France) Nathalie Tauziat	(Switzerland) Martina Hingis (France) Mary Pierce	4–6, 1–6
Win	11–18	Sep 2000	Luxembourg	Carpet (i)	(France) Nathalie Tauziat	(Bulgaria) Lubomira Bacheva (Spain) Cristina Torrens Valero	6–3, 7–6^{(7–0)}
Win	12–18	Jan 2001	Auckland, New Zealand	Hard	(Italy) Rita Grande	(Switzerland) Emmanuelle Gagliardi (Austria) Barbara Schett	7–6^{(7–4)}, 6–3
Loss	12–19	Apr 2001	Porto, Portugal	Clay	(Italy) Rita Grande	(Spain) María José Martínez Sánchez (Spain) Anabel Medina Garrigues	1–6, 7–6^{(7–5)}, 5–7
Loss	12–20	Feb 2002	Doha, Qatar	Hard	(Netherlands) Caroline Vis	(Slovakia) Janette Husárová (Spain) Arantxa Sánchez Vicario	3–6, 3–6
Loss	12–21	Apr 2002	Charleston, US	Clay	(Netherlands) Caroline Vis	(United States) Lisa Raymond (Australia) Rennae Stubbs	4–6, 6–3, 6–7^{(4–7)}

== ITF finals ==
=== Singles (6–2) ===
Legend
$75,000 tournaments
$50,000 tournaments
$25,000 tournaments
$10,000 tournaments

Result	No.	Date	Tournament	Surface	Opponent	Score
Loss	1.	19 March 1990	Granada, Spain	Hard	(Austria) Birgit Arming	1–6, 6–7
Win	2.	2 July 1990	Cherbourg, France	Clay	(Spain) María José Llorca	6–3, 2–6, 6–3
Win	3.	16 July 1990	Sezze, Italy	Clay	(France) Sophie Woorons	6–4, 6–3
Win	4.	8 April 1991	Limoges, France	Carpet	(Russia) Eugenia Maniokova	7–5, 5–7, 6–4
Loss	5.	14 June 1992	Modena, Italy	Clay	(South Africa) Joannette Kruger	4–6, 3–6
Win	6.	26 October 1992	Mount Gambier, Australia	Hard	(United States) Sandra Cacic	6–4, 6–2
Win	7.	23 November 1992	Nuriootpa, Australia	Hard	(Australia) Michelle Jaggard-Lai	7–6, 3–6, 6–3
Win	8.	8 May 1995	Szczecin, Poland	Clay	(Poland) Magdalena Grzybowska	7–5, 7–6

=== Doubles (2–7) ===
Result	No.	Date	Tournament	Surface	Partner	Opponents	Score
Loss	1.	2 July 1990	Cherbourg, France	Clay	(France) Olivia Gravereaux	(West Germany) Cora Linneman (Australia) Louise Pleming	4–6, 3–6
Loss	2.	24 June 1991	Caltagiron, Italy	Hard	(France) Olivia Gravereaux	(Italy) Silvia Farina Elia (Japan) Misumi Miyauchi	7–6, 4–6, 4–6
Loss	3.	14 June 1992	Modena, Italy	Clay	(Switzerland) Natalie Tschan	(Romania) Ruxandra Dragomir (Bulgaria) Elena Pampoulova	3–6, 6–7
Loss	4.	22 June 1992	Reggio Emilia, Italy	Clay	(France) Barbara Collet	(Romania) Ruxandra Dragomir (Switzerland) Natalie Tschan	6–3, 2–6, 1–6
Loss	5.	24 April 1995	Budapest, Hungary	Clay	(Australia) Kristin Godridge	(Czech Republic) Eva Melicharová (Czech Republic) Helena Vildová	3–6, 4–6
Win	6.	8 August 1999	Lexington, United States	Hard	(Argentina) Florencia Labat	(South Korea) Kim Eun-ha (United Kingdom) Julie Pullin	6–4, 6–1
Loss	7.	17 October 1999	Poitiers, France	Hard (i)	(Italy) Rita Grande	(France) Émilie Loit (Sweden) Åsa Carlsson	2–6, 6–7^{(5–7)}
Win	8.	20 February 2000	Redbridge, England	Hard (i)	(Slovenia) Tina Križan	(United Kingdom) Julie Pullin (United Kingdom) Lorna Woodroffe	7–6^{(7–4)}, 3–6, 7–6^{(7–1)}
Loss	9.	20 August 2000	Bronx, United States	Hard	(France) Émilie Loit	(South Africa) Surina De Beer (Japan) Nana Miyagi	7–5, 4–6, 4–6
