= 1999 WTA Tour Championships =

- Date: November 15–21
- Edition: 29th
- Category: Year-end championships
- Draw: 16S / 8D
- Prize money: $2,000,000
- Surface: Carpet / indoor
- Location: New York City, United States
- Venue: Madison Square Garden

Champions

Singles
- (United States) Lindsay Davenport

Doubles
- (Switzerland) Martina Hingis / (Russia) Anna Kournikova
- WTA Finals

The 1999 WTA Tour Championships, also known by its sponsored name The Chase Championships was a women's tennis tournament played on indoor carpet courts at the Madison Square Garden in New York City, New York in the United States. It was the 29th edition of the year-end singles championships, the 24th edition of the year-end doubles championships, and was part of the 1999 WTA Tour. The tournament was held from November 15 through November 21, 1999. Second-seeded Lindsay Davenport won the singles event and earned $500,000 first-prize money. The tournament discarded the best-of-five-set final which it had used since 1984 and reverted to a best-of-three-set final.

== Finals ==
=== Singles ===
(United States) Lindsay Davenport defeated (Switzerland) Martina Hingis, 6–4, 6–2.

- It was Davenport's 7th title of the year and the 26th of her career.

=== Doubles ===
(Switzerland) Martina Hingis / (Russia) Anna Kournikova defeated (Spain) Arantxa Sánchez Vicario / (Latvia) Larisa Neiland, 6–4, 6–4.

== Qualified players ==
=== Singles ===
| # | Players | Points | Tours |
|---|---|---|---|
| 1 | Martina Hingis (SUI) | 6,153 | 19(18) |
| 2 | Lindsay Davenport (USA) | 4,627 | 18 |
| 3 | Venus Williams (USA) | 4,125 | 16 |
| 4/inj | Serena Williams (USA) | 3,021 | 11 |
| ret | Steffi Graf (GER) | 3,000 | 11 |
| 5 | Mary Pierce (FRA) | 2,649 | 20(18) |
| inj | Monica Seles (USA) | 2,442 | 14 |
| 6 | Nathalie Tauziat (FRA) | 2,100 | 25(18) |
| 7 | Barbara Schett (AUT) | 2,086 | 22(18) |
| 8 | Julie Halard-Decugis (FRA) | 1,987 | 23(18) |
| 9 | Amélie Mauresmo (FRA) | 1,852 | 14 |
| 10 | Amanda Coetzer (RSA) | 1,816 | 24(18) |
| 11 | Anna Kournikova (RUS) | 1,642 | 19(18) |
| 12 | Sandrine Testud (FRA) | 1,642 | 25(18) |
| 13 | Dominique Van Roost (BEL) | 1,609 | 25(18) |
| 14 | Conchita Martínez (ESP) | 1,569 | 23(18) |
| 15 | Anke Huber (GER) | 1,452 | 25(18) |
| 16 | Arantxa Sánchez Vicario (ESP) | 1,435 | 18 |
| 17/Alt | Elena Likhovtseva (RUS) | 1,371 | 28(18) |
| DNQ | Amy Frazier (USA) | 1,301 | 20(18) |
| DNQ | Ruxandra Dragomir (ROU) | 1,296 | 23(18) |

== Race to the finals ==
Players with a gold background have enough points to qualify, while players with a blue background did not but could play as alternates. A brown background means a player qualified but was unable to play due to injury or retirement.

| Rank | Athlete | Points | | | | | | | | | | | | | | | | | | Total points | Tours |
| Rank | Athlete | 1 | 2 | 3 | 4 | 5 | 6 | 7 | 8 | 9 | 10 | 11 | 12 | 13 | 14 | 15 | 16 | 17 | 18 | Total points | Tours |
|---|---|---|---|---|---|---|---|---|---|---|---|---|---|---|---|---|---|---|---|---|---|
| 1 | (Switzerland) Martina Hingis | W 828 | F 662 | F 546 | W 429 | W 427 | W 394 | W 382 | W 356 | W 308 | F 243 | F 229 | W 200 | SF; 185 | SF; 167 | SF; 140 | QF; 102 | QF; 52 | R128; 2 | 5,654 | 18 |
| 2 | (United States) Lindsay Davenport | W 840 | SF; 516 | W 417 | SF; 380 | W 365 | W 318 | W 303 | F 201 | QF; 186 | W 179 | SF; 128 | SF; 128 | QF; 115 | QF; 73 | QF; 65 | R16; 27 | R32; 1 | | 4,242 | 17 |
| 3 | (United States) Venus Williams | W 483 | W 469 | W 426 | SF; 358 | W 345 | W 336 | F 298 | QF; 228 | F 206 | W 197 | QF; 196 | R16; 158 | SF; 125 | QF; 73 | R32; 1 | | | | 4,125 | 15 |
| 4 | (United States) Serena Williams | W 1,046 | W 468 | W 424 | W 418 | W 303 | R32; 98 | QF; 96 | QF; 79 | R32; 60 | R16; 28 | R16; 1 | | | | | | | | 3,021 | 11 |
| 5 | (Germany) Steffi Graf | W 1,064 | F 520 | F 283 | QF; 204 | SF; 186 | SF; 159 | SF; 121 | QF; 92 | QF; 86 | R16; 1 | | | | | | | | | 2,714 | 10 |
| 6 | (France) Mary Pierce | W 288 | F 283 | QF; 232 | F 229 | F 196 | QF; 190 | SF; 182 | SF; 175 | F 144 | SF; 133 | R16; 116 | QF; 88 | QF; 73 | QF; 65 | R16; 59 | QF; 39 | R64; 34 | R16; 1 | 2,529 | 19 |
| 7 | (United States) Monica Seles | SF; 430 | SF; 358 | W 286 | F 258 | QF; 226 | SF; 194 | F 167 | SF; 156 | R32; 68 | R16; 67 | R16; 59 | R16; 40 | R16; 1 | | | | | | 2,310 | 13 |
| 8 | (Austria) Barbara Schett | F 244 | R16; 226 | SF; 203 | QF; 196 | SF; 195 | QF; 120 | R16; 116 | QF; 112 | R32; 106 | QF; 93 | QF; 87 | QF; 81 | QF; 69 | SF; 59 | R16; 54 | R16; 49 | R16; 46 | R16; 30 | 2,131 | 22 |
| 9 | (France) Nathalie Tauziat | W 344 | W 270 | QF; 216 | SF; 210 | F 201 | F 132 | SF; 120 | R32; 84 | R16; 59 | QF; 54 | R16; 49 | R64; 42 | R16; 40 | R16; 40 | QF; 39 | R16; 36 | R16; 32 | R32; 1 | 1,976 | 24 |
| 10 | (France) Julie Halard-Decugis | F 285 | F 268 | W 234 | W 162 | R16; 112 | R16; 112 | QF; 103 | R32; 98 | F 95 | QF; 87 | QF; 80 | QF; 66 | SF; 60 | QF; 58 | R16; 41 | R32; 32 | R64; 30 | R32; 23 | 1,964 | 23 |
| 11 | (France) Amélie Mauresmo | F 766 | F 285 | SF; 172 | SF; 123 | W 110 | R16; 104 | QF; 97 | QF; 54 | R64; 46 | R16; 42 | R32; 32 | Q 19 | R32; 1 | R28; 1 | | | | | 1,852 | 14 |
| 12 | (South Africa) Amanda Coetzer | F 364 | SF; 155 | F 151 | SF; 128 | R16; 126 | QF; 126 | SF; 108 | QF; 88 | QF; 77 | QF; 73 | QF; 73 | R32; 68 | QF; 62 | QF; 60 | R16; 59 | R16; 38 | R16; 36 | R16; 24 | 1,846 | 24 |
| 13 | (Russia) Anna Kournikova | F 258 | SF; 216 | R16; 180 | SF; 138 | R16; 108 | R16; 100 | QF; 95 | QF; 90 | SF; 86 | QF; 75 | R16; 67 | R16; 59 | R16; 49 | R16; 34 | R16; 30 | R56; 1 | R56; 1 | R28; 1 | 1,589 | 18 |
| 14 | (France) Sandrine Testud | F 210 | SF; 187 | SF; 178 | R16; 140 | QF; 116 | QF; 93 | QF; 87 | QF; 85 | QF; 81 | QF; 73 | SF; 71 | R32; 68 | QF; 66 | R64; 49 | R64; 42 | R64; 34 | R64; 1 | R28; 1 | 1,589 | 24 |
| 15 | (Belgium) Dominique Van Roost | SF; 185 | QF; 166 | R16; 134 | SF; 128 | QF; 120 | F 117 | QF; 112 | F 95 | QF; 95 | R32; 80 | QF; 73 | R16; 49 | QF; 39 | R16; 36 | R16; 36 | R32; 24 | R16; 12 | R128; 2 | 1,511 | 24 |
| 16 | (Spain) Conchita Martínez | QF; 286 | W 191 | SF; 166 | R16; 134 | QF; 83 | QF; 75 | R16; 74 | R32; 68 | R32; 68 | QF; 68 | QF; 60 | R16; 56 | R16; 54 | R16; 50 | R16; 28 | R32; 26 | R32; 23 | R28; 1 | 1,516 | 22 |
| 17 | (Germany) Anke Huber | QF; 346 | SF; 156 | QF; 149 | SF; 130 | R64; 96 | QF; 90 | R16; 69 | R16; 59 | QF; 53 | R16; 50 | R16; 36 | R16; 36 | R16; 30 | R32; 30 | QF; 30 | R16; 26 | R16; 22 | R16; 18 | 1,434 | 25 |
| 18 | (Spain) Arantxa Sánchez Vicario | SF; 330 | SF; 190 | W 170 | R16; 154 | SF; 123 | QF; 98 | QF; 73 | QF; 65 | R16; 49 | R64; 46 | R16; 44 | R64; 34 | R64; 1 | R32; 1 | R16; 1 | R16; 1 | R28; 1 | | 1,381 | 17 |
| 19 | (Russia) Elena Likhovtseva | SF; 156 | QF; 151 | R16; 130 | F 127 | R32; 82 | R32; 82 | R16; 79 | QF; 75 | R16; 73 | R32; 68 | R16; 61 | QF; 56 | R16; 54 | R16; 46 | R16; 41 | R32; 30 | R16; 28 | R16; 22 | 1,371 | 28 |
| 20 | (United States) Amy Frazier | W 171 | SF; 155 | QF; 139 | SF; 137 | SF; 104 | R32; 90 | R64; 72 | R16; 69 | SF; 69 | R16; 61 | QF; 60 | SF; 58 | R64; 46 | R32; 32 | R32; 32 | R128; 2 | R56; 1 | R28; 1 | 1,301 | 20 |
| 21 | (Romania) Ruxandra Dragomir | SF; 254 | F 223 | SF; 183 | R16; 132 | R16; 71 | R32; 65 | R32; 60 | R64; 42 | R64; 42 | R16; 41 | R16; 36 | R32; 30 | R16; 28 | R32; 24 | R32; 23 | R16; 18 | R16; 18 | R56; 1 | 1,296 | 23 |
