= 1999 Porsche Tennis Grand Prix – Doubles =

Doubles
- 1999 Porsche Tennis Grand Prix

Final
- Champions: (United States) Chanda Rubin (France) Sandrine Testud
- Runners-up: (Spain) Arantxa Sánchez Vicario (Latvia) Larisa Neiland
- Score: 6–3, 6–4

Events
Singles	Doubles
← 1998 ·	Porsche Tennis Grand Prix	· 2000 →

The 1999 Porsche Tennis Grand Prix doubles was the tennis doubles event at the 1999 Porsche Tennis Grand Prix, the twenty-second edition of the most prestigious tournament in Baden-Württemberg. Lindsay Davenport and Natasha Zvereva were the defending champions, but they did not compete together this year. Davenport competed with Martina Hingis as the first seed, while Zvereva competed with Elena Tatarkova. Davenport and Hingis withdrew in the quarterfinals due to Davenport having a wrist injury, whilst Tatarkova and Zvereva were knocked out in the first round.

US Open finalists Chanda Rubin and Sandrine Testud won the title, defeating third seeds Arantxa Sánchez Vicario and Larisa Neiland.

== Seeds ==
1. (United States) Lindsay Davenport / (Switzerland) Martina Hingis (quarterfinals, withdrew due to Davenport wrist injury)
2. (Belarus) Natasha Zvereva / (Ukraine) Elena Tatarkova (first round)
3. (Spain) Arantxa Sánchez Vicario / (Latvia) Larisa Neiland (final)
4. (United States) Lisa Raymond / (Australia) Rennae Stubbs (semifinals)

== Draw ==
=== Key ===
- Q = Qualifier
- WC = Wild card
- LL = Lucky loser
- Alt = Alternate
- SE = Special exempt
- PR = Protected ranking
- ITF = ITF entry
- JE = Junior exempt
- w/o = Walkover
- r = Retired
- d = Defaulted
- SR = Special ranking

First round
1	(United States) L Davenport (Switzerland) M Hingis	7	6
(Netherlands) M Bollegraf (Argentina) P Tarabini	5	1
(United States) K Po (France) A-G Sidot	6	6
(South Africa) A Coetzer (Czech Republic) J Novotná	3	1
3	(Spain) A Sánchez Vicario (Latvia) L Neiland	5	6	7
(Belgium) L Courtois (Slovenia) T Križan	7	2	5
WC	(Germany) M Buric (Germany) A Huber	5	4
(Russia) E Likhovtseva (Slovenia) K Srebotnik	7	6
(Italy) S Farina Elia (Slovakia) K Habšudová	6	4	2
Q	(Czech Republic) K Hrdličková (Germany) B Rittner	4	6	6
(United States) MJ Fernández (France) M Pierce	6	3	1
4	(United States) L Raymond (Australia) R Stubbs	3	6	6
(France) A Fusai (France) N Tauziat	5	5
(United States) C Rubin (France) S Testud	7	7
(Romania) I Spîrlea (Netherlands) C Vis	6	3	7^{7}
2	(Belarus) N Zvereva (Ukraine) E Tatarkova	1	6	6^{5}

Quarterfinals
1	(United States) L Davenport (Switzerland) M Hingis
(United States) K Po (France) A-G Sidot	w/o
3	(Spain) A Sánchez Vicario (Latvia) L Neiland	6	6
(Russia) E Likhovtseva (Slovenia) K Srebotnik	2	1
Q	(Czech Republic) K Hrdličková (Germany) B Rittner	3	5
4	(United States) L Raymond (Australia) R Stubbs	6	7
(United States) C Rubin (France) S Testud	6	6
(Romania) I Spîrlea (Netherlands) C Vis	4	2

Semifinals
(United States) K Po (France) A-G Sidot	1	7^{9}	0
3	(Spain) A Sánchez Vicario (Latvia) L Neiland	6	6^{7}	6
4	(United States) L Raymond (Australia) R Stubbs	4	6	5
(United States) C Rubin (France) S Testud	6	4	7

Final
3	(Spain) A Sánchez Vicario (Latvia) L Neiland	3	4
(United States) C Rubin (France) S Testud	6	6

== Qualifying ==
=== Seeds ===
1. (Czech Republic) Květa Hrdličková / (Germany) Barbara Rittner (Qualifier)
2. (Belarus) Olga Barabanschikova / (Netherlands) Miriam Oremans (qualifying competition)

=== Qualifiers ===
1. (Czech Republic) Květa Hrdličková / (Germany) Barbara Rittner

== Qualifying draw ==
=== Key ===
- Q = Qualifier
- WC = Wild card
- LL = Lucky loser
- Alt = Alternate
- SE = Special exempt
- PR = Protected ranking
- ITF = ITF entry
- JE = Junior exempt
- w/o = Walkover
- r = Retired
- d = Defaulted
- SR = Special ranking

First round
1	(Czech Republic) Květa Hrdličková (Germany) Barbara Rittner	8
(Germany) Angelika Bachmann (Germany) Jasmin Wöhr	5
WC	(Germany) Sandra Klösel (Spain) Magüi Serna	6
2	(Belarus) Olga Barabanschikova (Netherlands) Miriam Oremans	8

Qualifying competition
1	(Czech Republic) Květa Hrdličková (Germany) Barbara Rittner	8
2	(Belarus) Olga Barabanschikova (Netherlands) Miriam Oremans	1
