= 1999 Pilot Pen Tennis – Singles =

Singles
- 1999 Pilot Pen Tennis

Final
- Champion: (United States) Venus Williams
- Runner-up: (United States) Lindsay Davenport
- Score: 6–2, 7–5

Details
- Draw: 28
- Seeds: 8

Events
Singles	Doubles
- Pilot Pen Tennis

The 1999 Pilot Pen Tennis singles was the singles event of the seventeenth edition of the final tournament in the US Open Series. Steffi Graf was the reigning champion, but had retired after the TIG Classic.

Venus Williams defeated Lindsay Davenport 6-2, 7-5 in the final to win her first New Haven title. Williams did not lose a set in the tournament.

== Seeds ==
1. (United States) Lindsay Davenport (final)
2. (United States) Venus Williams (champion)
3. (United States) Monica Seles (semifinals)
4. (Czech Republic) Jana Novotná (second round)
5. (South Africa) Amanda Coetzer (quarterfinals, retired)
6. (France) Julie Halard-Decugis (second round)
7. (France) Nathalie Tauziat (first round)
8. (France) Sandrine Testud (quarterfinals)

== Draw ==
Key

- Q = Qualifier
- WC = Wild card
- LL = Lucky loser
- Alt = Alternate
- ITF = ITF entry
- PR = Protected ranking
- SR = Special ranking
- SE = Special exempt
- JE = Junior exempt
- JR = Junior Accelerator Programme entrant
- CO = College Accelerator Programme entrant
- NG = Next Gen Accelerator Program entrant
- w/o = Walkover
- r = Retired
- d = Defaulted

=== Finals ===
Semifinals
1	(United States) Lindsay Davenport	4	6	6
(Romania) Ruxandra Dragomir	6	2	0
3	(United States) Monica Seles	1	3
2	(United States) Venus Williams	6	6

Final
1	(United States) Lindsay Davenport	2	5
2	(United States) Venus Williams	6	7

=== Top half ===
First round
(France) N Dechy	6	6
Q	(Russia) T Panova	1	3
Q	(Czech Republic) K Hrdličková	4	6	5
(France) A Mauresmo	6	3	7
(Germany) A Huber	6	6^{4}	2
6	(France) J Halard-Decugis	4	7^{7}	6
(Italy) S Farina	5	7^{9}	5
(Romania) R Dragomir	7	6^{7}	7
Q	(Spain) Á Montolio	6	4	2
Q	(Austria) B Schwartz	4	6	6
WC	(United States) T Snyder	6^{4}	3
8	(France) S Testud	7^{7}	6

Second round
1	(United States) L Davenport	6	6
(France) N Dechy	4	2
(France) A Mauresmo	6	6
6	(France) J Halard-Decugis	1	2
4	(Czech Republic) J Novotná	6^{5}	0
(Romania) R Dragomir	7^{7}	6
Q	(Austria) B Schwartz	4	2
8	(France) S Testud	6	6

Quarterfinals
1	(United States) L Davenport	6	6
(France) A Mauresmo	1	2
(Romania) R Dragomir	5	6	7
8	(France) S Testud	7	4	5

Semifinals
1	(United States) L Davenport	4	6	6
(Romania) R Dragomir	6	2	0

=== Bottom half ===
First round
5	(South Africa) A Coetzer	6	4	6
Q	(France) A Cocheteux	3	6	1
Q	(Belgium) S Appelmans	3	6	6
(Austria) S Plischke	6	1	4
(Russia) E Likhovtseva	4	7	7
(United States) L Raymond	6	5	5
7	(France) N Tauziat	6	3	3
(Slovakia) H Nagyová	3	6	6
WC	(United States) L Osterloh	3	3
Q	(Spain) M Serna	6	6
Q	(Spain) M Sánchez Lorenzo	6	5	6
(Belgium) D Van Roost	2	7	2

Second round
6	(South Africa) A Coetzer	5
Q	(Belgium) S Appelmans	4^{r}
(Russia) E Likhovtseva	0	6^{6}
3	(United States) M Seles	6	7^{8}
(Slovakia) H Nagyová	6^{5}	6	3
Q	(Spain) M Serna	7^{7}	3	6
Q	(Spain) M Sánchez Lorenzo	1	1
2	(United States) V Williams	6	6

Quarterfinals
6	(South Africa) A Coetzer	2	1
3	(United States) M Seles	6	6
Q	(Spain) M Serna	0	4
2	(United States) V Williams	6	6

Semifinals
3	(United States) M Seles	1	3
2	(United States) V Williams	6	6

== Qualifying ==
=== Seeds ===
1. (Luxembourg) Anne Kremer (qualifying competition)
2. (France) Sarah Pitkowski (second round)
3. (Spain) María Sánchez Lorenzo (Qualifier)
4. (Spain) Magüi Serna (Qualifier)
5. replaced by (United States) Melissa Mazzotta (qualifying competition)
6. (United States) Alexandra Stevenson (second round)
7. (Israel) Anna Smashnova (second round)
8. (Spain) Gala León García (second round)
9. (Colombia) Fabiola Zuluaga (second round)
10. (Spain) Cristina Torrens Valero (qualifying competition)
11. (Germany) Barbara Rittner (second round)
12. (Austria) Barbara Schwartz (Qualifier)
13. (Zimbabwe) Cara Black (qualifying competition)
14. (Slovenia) Katarina Srebotnik (second round)
15. (Argentina) Inés Gorrochategui (qualifying competition)
16. (Germany) Marlene Weingärtner (second round)

=== Qualifiers ===
1. (Russia) Tatiana Panova
2. (France) Amélie Cocheteux
3. (Spain) Magüi Serna
4. (Belgium) Sabine Appelmans
5. (Austria) Barbara Schwartz
6. (Spain) María Sánchez Lorenzo
7. (Czech Republic) Květa Hrdličková
8. (Spain) Ángeles Montolio

== Qualifying draw ==
Key

- Q = Qualifier
- WC = Wild card
- LL = Lucky loser
- Alt = Alternate
- ITF = ITF entry
- PR = Protected ranking
- SR = Special ranking
- SE = Special exempt
- JE = Junior exempt
- JR = Junior Accelerator Programme entrant
- CO = College Accelerator Programme entrant
- NG = Next Gen Accelerator Program entrant
- w/o = Walkover
- r = Retired
- d = Defaulted

=== First qualifier ===
First round			Second round				Qualifying competition
			1	(Luxembourg) Anne Kremer	6	4
(Paraguay) Larissa Schaerer	6	2		(Switzerland) Emmanuelle Gagliardi	0	1^{r}
(Switzerland) Emmanuelle Gagliardi	7	6					1	(Luxembourg) Anne Kremer	3	7	6
(United States) Meghann Shaughnessy	4	3						(Russia) Tatiana Panova	6	6	7
(Russia) Tatiana Panova	6	6		(Russia) Tatiana Panova	6	7
			11	(Germany) Barbara Rittner	4	5

=== Second qualifier ===
First round				Second round				Qualifying competition
				16	(Germany) Marlene Weingärtner	2	1
(France) Alexia Dechaume-Balleret	6	3	4		(Chinese Taipei) Janet Lee	6	6
(Chinese Taipei) Janet Lee	2	6	6					(Chinese Taipei) Janet Lee	6	2	4
(Australia) Alicia Molik	4	6	4					(France) Amélie Cocheteux	2	6	6
(France) Amélie Cocheteux	6	4	6		(France) Amélie Cocheteux	6	6
				6	(United States) Alexandra Stevenson	4	4

=== Third qualifier ===
First round				Second round					Qualifying competition
				4	(Spain) Magüi Serna	6	1	6
(Netherlands) Seda Noorlander					(United States) Meilen Tu	4	6	0
(United States) Meilen Tu	w/o								4	(Spain) Magüi Serna	6	6
(Czech Republic) Lenka Němečková	3	6	6						13	(Zimbabwe) Cara Black	4	3
(Slovakia) Katarína Studeníková	6	2	0		(Czech Republic) Lenka Němečková	6	6
				13	(Zimbabwe) Cara Black	4	4

=== Fourth qualifier ===
First round					Second round				Qualifying competition
					10	(Spain) Cristina Torrens Valero	w/o
	(Czech Republic) Denisa Chládková	6	6			(Czech Republic) Denisa Chládková
Alt	(United States) Tracy Singian	2	4						10	(Spain) Cristina Torrens Valero	3	6	6
	(Belgium) Sabine Appelmans	2	6	6						(Belgium) Sabine Appelmans	6	1	7
	(Australia) Kristine Kunce	6	1	1		(Belgium) Sabine Appelmans	7	6
					8	(Spain) Gala León García	5	2

=== Fifth qualifier ===
First round				Second round				Qualifying competition
				Alt	(United States) Melissa Mazzotta	6	6
WC	(United States) Linda Wild	6	6	WC	(United States) Linda Wild	4	3
WC	(United States) Jolene Watanabe	2	4					Alt	(United States) Melissa Mazzotta	0	0^{r}
	(France) Émilie Loit	6	6					12	(Austria) Barbara Schwartz	6	3
WC	(United States) Patty Murren	2	4		(France) Émilie Loit	2	3
				12	(Austria) Barbara Schwartz	6	6

=== Sixth qualifier ===
First round					Second round				Qualifying competition
					9	(Colombia) Fabiola Zuluaga	1	2
	(Czech Republic) Sandra Kleinová	3	7	6		(Czech Republic) Sandra Kleinová	6	6
WC	(United States) Jennifer Hopkins	6	6	3						(Czech Republic) Sandra Kleinová	4	4
	(Italy) Adriana Serra Zanetti	4	0						3	(Spain) María Sánchez Lorenzo	6	6
	(Netherlands) Miriam Oremans	6	6			(Netherlands) Miriam Oremans	4	4
					3	(Spain) María Sánchez Lorenzo	6	6

=== Seventh qualifier ===
First round			Second round					Qualifying competition
			7	(Israel) Anna Smashnova	1	7	3
(Spain) Virginia Ruano Pascual	4	2		(Czech Republic) Květa Hrdličková	6	6	6
(Czech Republic) Květa Hrdličková	6	6						(Czech Republic) Květa Hrdličková	6	7
(Hungary) Rita Kuti-Kis	2	6						(Australia) Nicole Pratt	4	5
(Australia) Nicole Pratt	6	7		(Australia) Nicole Pratt	6	1	6
			14	(Slovenia) Katarina Srebotnik	4	6	3

=== Eighth qualifier ===
First round				Second round					Qualifying competition
				15	(Argentina) Inés Gorrochategui	6	6	3
WC	(United States) Brandis Braverman	7	6	WC	(United States) Brandis Braverman	2	0
	(Poland) Magdalena Grzybowska	5	2						15	(Argentina) Inés Gorrochategui	3	6	3
	(Spain) Ángeles Montolio	7	6							(Spain) Ángeles Montolio	6	0	6
	(Italy) Rita Grande	6	2		(Spain) Ángeles Montolio	7	6
				2	(France) Sarah Pitkowski	5	1
