= 1999 TIG Classic – Doubles =

Doubles
- 1999 TIG Classic

Final
- Champions: (United States) Lindsay Davenport (United States) Corina Morariu
- Runners-up: (United States) Serena Williams (United States) Venus Williams
- Score: 6–4, 6–1

Details
- Draw: 16
- Seeds: 4

Events
Singles	Doubles
- TIG Classic

The 1999 TIG Classic doubles was the doubles event of the twentieth edition of the second tournament in the US Open Series.

Lindsay Davenport and Natasha Zvereva were the defending champions, but they did not compete together this year. Zvereva competed with Nathalie Tauziat, and Davenport competed with Corina Morariu; the two teams met in a semifinal match which Davenport and Morariu won. The Americans defeated the Williams sisters in the final to win the tournament. This tournament is notable for being the only doubles final the Williams sisters (as a pair) have lost in their career.

== Seeds ==
1. (France) Nathalie Tauziat / (Belarus) Natasha Zvereva (semifinals)
2. (Russia) Elena Likhovtseva / (Japan) Ai Sugiyama (semifinals)
3. (United States) Lindsay Davenport / (United States) Corina Morariu (champions)
4. (United States) Serena Williams / (United States) Venus Williams (final)

== Draw ==
Key

- Q = Qualifier
- WC = Wild card
- LL = Lucky loser
- Alt = Alternate
- ITF = ITF entry
- PR = Protected ranking
- SR = Special ranking
- SE = Special exempt
- JE = Junior exempt
- JR = Junior Accelerator Programme entrant
- CO = College Accelerator Programme entrant
- NG = Next Gen Accelerator Program entrant
- w/o = Walkover
- r = Retired
- d = Defaulted

First round
1	(France) N Tauziat (Belarus) N Zvereva	6	6
(Australia) A Molik (France) A-G Sidot	1	4
(Spain) C Martínez (Argentina) P Tarabini	2	6	7
(Austria) B Schett (Switzerland) P Schnyder	6	1	5
3	(United States) L Davenport (United States) C Morariu	6	2	6
(Germany) A Huber (Ukraine) E Tatarkova	3	6	2
Q	(Chinese Taipei) J Lee (Canada) V Webb	2	4
WC	(Croatia) I Majoli (Belgium) D Van Roost	6	6
(South Africa) A Coetzer (United States) K Po	5	6	5
(Zimbabwe) C Black (Romania) C Cristea	7	2	7
(Slovenia) T Križan (Slovenia) K Srebotnik	6	2	2
4	(United States) S Williams (United States) V Williams	1	6	6
(United States) D Graham (France) M Pierce	6	3	0
(Latvia) L Neiland (Spain) A Sánchez Vicario	1	6	6
WC	(Romania) I Spîrlea (Netherlands) C Vis	5	6	4
2	(Russia) E Likhovtseva (Japan) A Sugiyama	7	3	6

Quarterfinals
1	(France) N Tauziat (Belarus) N Zvereva	7^{7}	6
(Spain) C Martínez (Argentina) P Tarabini	6^{0}	1
3	(United States) L Davenport (United States) C Morariu	6	6
WC	(Croatia) I Majoli (Belgium) D Van Roost	3	3
(Zimbabwe) C Black (Romania) C Cristea	2	3
4	(United States) S Williams (United States) V Williams	6	6
(Latvia) L Neiland (Spain) A Sánchez Vicario	3	7^{9}	0
2	(Russia) E Likhovtseva (Japan) A Sugiyama	6	6^{7}	6

Semifinals
1	(France) N Tauziat (Belarus) N Zvereva	4	4
3	(United States) L Davenport (United States) C Morariu	6	6
4	(United States) S Williams (United States) V Williams	6	6
2	(Russia) E Likhovtseva (Japan) A Sugiyama	2	0

Final
3	(United States) L Davenport (United States) C Morariu	6	6
4	(United States) S Williams (United States) V Williams	4	1

== Qualifying ==
=== Seeds ===
1. (United States) Meghann Shaughnessy / (Bulgaria) Pavlina Stoyanova (second round)
2. (Chinese Taipei) Janet Lee / (Canada) Vanessa Webb (Qualifiers)

=== Qualifiers ===
1. (Chinese Taipei) Janet Lee / (Canada) Vanessa Webb

== Qualifying draw ==
Key

- Q = Qualifier
- WC = Wild card
- LL = Lucky loser
- Alt = Alternate
- ITF = ITF entry
- PR = Protected ranking
- SR = Special ranking
- SE = Special exempt
- JE = Junior exempt
- JR = Junior Accelerator Programme entrant
- CO = College Accelerator Programme entrant
- NG = Next Gen Accelerator Program entrant
- w/o = Walkover
- r = Retired
- d = Defaulted

First round
(United States) Allison Bradshaw (Mexico) Angélica Gavaldón
WC	(United States) Melissa Mazzotta (Colombia) Fabiola Zuluaga	w/o
(United States) Jane Chi (United States) Amy Frazier	8
(Luxembourg) Anne Kremer (United States) Meilen Tu	5

Second round
1	(United States) Meghann Shaughnessy (Bulgaria) Pavlina Stoyanova	3
WC	(United States) Melissa Mazzotta (Colombia) Fabiola Zuluaga	8
(United States) Jane Chi (United States) Amy Frazier	5
2	(Chinese Taipei) Janet Lee (Canada) Vanessa Webb	8

Qualifying competition
WC	(United States) Melissa Mazzotta (Colombia) Fabiola Zuluaga	4
2	(Chinese Taipei) Janet Lee (Canada) Vanessa Webb	8
