= 1999 Porsche Tennis Grand Prix – Singles =

Singles
- 1999 Porsche Tennis Grand Prix

Final
- Champion: (Switzerland) Martina Hingis
- Runner-up: (France) Mary Pierce
- Score: 6–4, 6–1

Details
- Draw: 28 (3WC / 4Q)
- Seeds: 8

Events
Singles	Doubles
← 1998 ·	Porsche Tennis Grand Prix	· 2000 →

Sandrine Testud was the defending champion, but was defeated by Martina Hingis in the semifinals.

Hingis went on to win the title, defeating Mary Pierce in the final 6–4, 6–1.

== Seeds ==
1. (Switzerland) Martina Hingis (champion)
2. (United States) Lindsay Davenport (quarterfinals, withdrew due to left wrist injury)
3. (United States) Serena Williams (second round)
4. (France) Mary Pierce (final)
5. (South Africa) Amanda Coetzer (first round)
6. (Austria) Barbara Schett (quarterfinals)
7. (France) Julie Halard-Decugis (first round)
8. (Belgium) Dominique Van Roost (second round)

== Draw ==
=== Key ===
- Q = Qualifier
- WC = Wild card
- LL = Lucky loser
- Alt = Alternate
- ITF = ITF entry
- PR = Protected ranking
- SR = Special ranking
- SE = Special exempt
- JE = Junior exempt
- JR = Junior Accelerator Programme entrant
- CO = College Accelerator Programme entrant
- NG = Next Gen Accelerator Program entrant
- w/o = Walkover
- r = Retired
- d = Defaulted

=== Finals ===
Semifinals
1	(Switzerland) Martina Hingis	6^{7}	6	6
(France) Sandrine Testud	7^{9}	2	4
4	(France) Mary Pierce	6	7^{7}
WC	(Germany) Anke Huber	1	6^{2}

Final
1	(Switzerland) Martina Hingis	6	6
4	(France) Mary Pierce	4	1

=== Top half ===
First round
WC	(United States) J Capriati	6	6
(Romania) I Spîrlea	4	1
(France) N Dechy	7^{7}	6
WC	(United States) MJ Fernández	6^{4}	1
LL	(Spain) M Serna	4	6^{4}
8	(Belgium) D Van Roost	6	7^{7}
(France) S Testud	6	6
(United States) C Rubin	3	2
(Spain) C Martínez	6	4	2
(United States) A Frazier	4	6	6
Q	(Belgium) S Appelmans	7^{7}	6
5	(South Africa) A Coetzer	6^{5}	2

Second round
1	(Switzerland) M Hingis	6	6
WC	(United States) J Capriati	4	0
(France) N Dechy	6	6
8	(Belgium) D Van Roost	3	2
3	(United States) S Williams	6	4	5
(France) S Testud	3	6	7
(United States) A Frazier	2	6
Q	(Belgium) S Appelmans	6	7

Quarterfinals
1	(Switzerland) M Hingis	6	6
(France) N Dechy	2	4
(France) S Testud	6	6
Q	(Belgium) S Appelmans	4	3

Semifinals
1	(Switzerland) M Hingis	6^{7}	6	6
(France) S Testud	7^{9}	2	4

=== Bottom half ===
First round
6	(Austria) B Schett	5	6	7
(France) N Tauziat	7	2	5
Q	(Russia) E Dementieva	6	7
Q	(United States) L Raymond	2	5
LL	(France) A-G Sidot	6^{4}	6	5
(Belarus) N Zvereva	7^{7}	2	7
7	(France) J Halard-Decugis	6	5	1
WC	(Germany) A Huber	4	7	6
(Russia) E Likhovtseva	6	6
(Spain) A Sánchez Vicario	1	4
(Czech Republic) J Novotná	3	4
Q	(Italy) S Farina Elia	6	6

Second round
6	(Austria) B Schett	6	6
Q	(Russia) E Dementieva	3	1
(Belarus) N Zvereva	6^{3}	7	4
4	(France) M Pierce	7^{7}	5	6
WC	(Germany) A Huber	6	6
(Russia) E Likhovtseva	4	3
Q	(Italy) S Farina Elia	0	1
2	(United States) L Davenport	6	6

Quarterfinals
6	(Austria) B Schett	6^{1}	6^{2}
4	(France) M Pierce	7^{7}	7^{7}
WC	(Germany) A Huber	w/o
2	(United States) L Davenport

Semifinals
4	(France) M Pierce	6	7^{7}
WC	(Germany) A Huber	1	6^{2}

== Qualifying ==
=== Seeds ===
1. (Romania) Ruxandra Dragomir (first round)
2. (Italy) Silvia Farina Elia (qualifier)
3. (France) Anne-Gaëlle Sidot (qualifying competition, lucky loser)
4. (Slovakia) Henrieta Nagyová (first round)
5. (United States) Lisa Raymond (qualifier)
6. (Spain) Magüi Serna (qualifying competition, lucky loser)
7. (Spain) María Sánchez Lorenzo (qualifying competition)
8. (Belgium) Sabine Appelmans (qualifier)

=== Qualifiers ===
1. (Belgium) Sabine Appelmans
2. (Russia) Elena Dementieva
3. (United States) Lisa Raymond
4. (Italy) Silvia Farina Elia

=== Lucky losers ===
1. (Spain) Magüi Serna
2. (France) Anne-Gaëlle Sidot

== Qualifying draw ==
=== Key ===
- Q = Qualifier
- WC = Wild card
- LL = Lucky loser
- Alt = Alternate
- ITF = ITF entry
- PR = Protected ranking
- SR = Special ranking
- SE = Special exempt
- JE = Junior exempt
- JR = Junior Accelerator Programme entrant
- CO = College Accelerator Programme entrant
- NG = Next Gen Accelerator Program entrant
- w/o = Walkover
- r = Retired
- d = Defaulted

=== First qualifier ===
First round
1	(Romania) Ruxandra Dragomir	0	2
(Bulgaria) Lubomira Bacheva	6	6
(Federal Republic of Yugoslavia) Sandra Naćuk	6	6
(Slovenia) Tina Križan	2	3
(Germany) Barbara Rittner	6	6
(Czech Republic) Sandra Kleinová	2	3
(Italy) Rita Grande	4	4
8	(Belgium) Sabine Appelmans	6	6

Second round
(Bulgaria) Lubomira Bacheva	4	6	6
(Federal Republic of Yugoslavia) Sandra Naćuk	6	2	4
(Germany) Barbara Rittner	5	2
8	(Belgium) Sabine Appelmans	7	6

Qualifying competition
(Bulgaria) Lubomira Bacheva	3	6^{7}
8	(Belgium) Sabine Appelmans	6	7^{9}

=== Second qualifier ===
First round
4	(Slovakia) Henrieta Nagyová	2	2
(Russia) Elena Dementieva	6	6
(United States) Kimberly Po	6	6
(Russia) Tatiana Panova	1	2
(Netherlands) Miriam Oremans	6^{7}	5
(Slovakia) Karina Habšudová	7^{9}	7
(Ukraine) Elena Tatarkova	2	4
6	(Spain) Magüi Serna	6	6

Second round
(Russia) Elena Dementieva	7^{7}	3	7
(United States) Kimberly Po	6^{3}	6	5
(Slovakia) Karina Habšudová	3	4
6	(Spain) Magüi Serna	6	6

Qualifying competition
(Russia) Elena Dementieva	6	5	7^{7}
6	(Spain) Magüi Serna	3	7	6^{3}

=== Third qualifier ===
First round
5	(United States) Lisa Raymond	6	6
WC	(Germany) Sandra Klösel	3	0
(Czech Republic) Květa Hrdličková	6	4	2
(Belarus) Olga Barabanschikova	0	6	6
(Germany) Angelika Bachmann	4	6	5
(Austria) Barbara Schwartz	6	3	7
(Germany) Marlene Weingärtner	5	3
3	(France) Anne-Gaëlle Sidot	7	6

Second round
5	(United States) Lisa Raymond	6	6
(Belarus) Olga Barabanschikova	4	3
(Austria) Barbara Schwartz	6	1	5
3	(France) Anne-Gaëlle Sidot	3	6	7

Qualifying competition
5	(United States) Lisa Raymond	6	7^{7}
3	(France) Anne-Gaëlle Sidot	2	6^{3}

=== Fourth qualifier ===
First round
7	(Spain) María Sánchez Lorenzo	7	1	6
(Czech Republic) Denisa Chládková	5	6	4
WC	(Germany) Jasmin Wöhr	6	4	2
WC	(Germany) Mia Buric	0	6	6
(Belgium) Laurence Courtois	6	6
(Slovenia) Katarina Srebotnik	2	2
WC	(Germany) Scarlett Werner	0	3
2	(Italy) Silvia Farina Elia	6	6

Second round
7	(Spain) María Sánchez Lorenzo	6	3	6
WC	(Germany) Mia Buric	1	6	4
(Belgium) Laurence Courtois	5	7^{9}	3
2	(Italy) Silvia Farina Elia	7	6^{7}	6

Qualifying competition
7	(Spain) María Sánchez Lorenzo	2	4
2	(Italy) Silvia Farina Elia	6	6
