= 1999 Bank of the West Classic – Singles =

Singles
- 1999 Bank of the West Classic

Final
- Champion: (United States) Lindsay Davenport
- Runner-up: (United States) Venus Williams
- Score: 7–6^{(7–1)}, 6–2

Details
- Draw: 28
- Seeds: 8

Events
Singles	Doubles
← 1998 ·	Bank of the West Classic	· 2000 →

The 1999 Bank of the West Classic singles was the singles event of the twenty-eighth edition of the first tournament in the US Open Series.

Lindsay Davenport and Venus Williams were the respective defending champion and runner-up, and they met in the final again. Davenport won for a second consecutive year to claim her twenty-third singles title.

== Seeds ==
1. (United States) Lindsay Davenport (champion)
2. (United States) Venus Williams (final)
3. (United States) Monica Seles (withdrew)
4. (South Africa) Amanda Coetzer (semifinals)
5. (Austria) Barbara Schett (second round)
6. (Russia) Anna Kournikova (quarterfinals)
7. (Belgium) Dominique Van Roost (first round)
8. (France) Sandrine Testud (quarterfinals)
9. (Spain) Conchita Martínez (first round)

== Draw ==
=== Key ===
- Q = Qualifier
- WC = Wild card
- LL = Lucky loser
- Alt = Alternate
- SE = Special exempt
- PR = Protected ranking
- ITF = ITF entry
- JE = Junior exempt
- w/o = Walkover
- r = Retired
- d = Defaulted
- SR = Special ranking

=== Finals ===
Semifinals
1	(United States) Lindsay Davenport	6	6
(United States) Amy Frazier	0	4
4	(South Africa) Amanda Coetzer	1	4
2	(United States) Venus Williams	6	6

Final
1	(United States) Lindsay Davenport	7^{7}	6
2	(United States) Venus Williams	6^{1}	2

=== Top half ===
First round
(Romania) I Spîrlea	4	4
(United States) C Rubin	6	6
Q	(France) A-G Sidot	1	4
(United States) C Morariu	6	6
(United States) J Capriati	5	6	6
9	(Spain) C Martínez	7	4	4
(United States) A Frazier	6	6
(Germany) A Huber	2	4
Q	(Colombia) F Zuluaga	3	6	6
Q	(Thailand) T Tanasugarn	6	4	3
(Luxembourg) A Kremer	6	1
7	(Belgium) D Van Roost	0	0	r

Second round
1	(United States) L Davenport	6	6^{7}	6
(United States) C Rubin	3	7^{9}	3
(United States) C Morariu	7	6
(United States) J Capriati	5	2
5	(Austria) B Schett	4	0
(United States) A Frazier	6	6
Q	(Colombia) F Zuluaga	2	4
(Luxembourg) A Kremer	6	6

Quarterfinals
1	(United States) L Davenport	6	6
(United States) C Morariu	3	3
(United States) A Frazier	7	6
(Luxembourg) A Kremer	5	0

Semifinals
1	(United States) L Davenport	6	6
(United States) A Frazier	0	4

=== Bottom half ===
First round
8	(France) S Testud	6	6
WC	(Croatia) I Majoli	1	1
(Russia) E Likhovtseva	3	5
(Switzerland) P Schnyder	6	7
(United States) L Raymond	3	6	6
(Zimbabwe) C Black	6	1	2
6	(Russia) A Kournikova	6	6
(Croatia) M Lučić	4	2
(United States) MJ Fernández	6	6
Q	(Canada) M Drake	2	2
LL	(United States) J Chi	3	1
(Slovenia) K Srebotnik	6	6

Second round
8	(France) S Testud	6	6
(Switzerland) P Schnyder	4	1
(United States) L Raymond	6	2	5
4	(South Africa) A Coetzer	4	6	7
6	(Russia) A Kournikova	6	6
(United States) MJ Fernández	4	4
(Slovenia) K Srebotnik	1	6^{3}
2	(United States) V Williams	6	7^{7}

Quarterfinals
8	(France) S Testud	6	5	2
4	(South Africa) A Coetzer	2	7	6
6	(Russia) A Kournikova	1	3
2	(United States) V Williams	6	6

Semifinals
4	(South Africa) A Coetzer	1	4
2	(United States) V Williams	6	6

== Qualifying ==
=== Seeds ===
1. (France) Anne-Gaëlle Sidot (qualifier)
2. (Colombia) Fabiola Zuluaga (qualifier)
3. (Canada) Maureen Drake (qualifier)
4. (Thailand) Tamarine Tanasugarn (qualifier)
5. (United States) Jane Chi (qualifying competition, lucky loser)
6. (United States) Kimberly Po (qualifying competition)
7. (United States) Meghann Shaughnessy (second round)
8. (Bulgaria) Pavlina Stoyanova (second round)

=== Qualifiers ===
1. (France) Anne-Gaëlle Sidot
2. (Thailand) Tamarine Tanasugarn
3. (Canada) Maureen Drake
4. (Colombia) Fabiola Zuluaga

=== Lucky loser ===
1. (United States) Jane Chi

== Qualifying draw ==
=== Key ===
- Q = Qualifier
- WC = Wild card
- LL = Lucky loser
- Alt = Alternate
- SE = Special exempt
- PR = Protected ranking
- ITF = ITF entry
- JE = Junior exempt
- w/o = Walkover
- r = Retired
- d = Defaulted
- SR = Special ranking

=== First qualifier ===
First round
(United States) Mashona Washington	5	6	6
WC	(United States) Candice Fuchs	7	1	2
(United States) Erika deLone
WC	(United States) Gabriela Lastra	w/o
(United States) Teryn Ashley	4	4
8	(Bulgaria) Pavlina Stoyanova	6	6

Second round
1	(France) Anne-Gaëlle Sidot	2	6	7
(United States) Mashona Washington	6	4	5
WC	(United States) Gabriela Lastra	7^{7}	6
8	(Bulgaria) Pavlina Stoyanova	6^{4}	2

Qualifying competition
1	(France) Anne-Gaëlle Sidot	7	6
WC	(United States) Gabriela Lastra	5	3

=== Second qualifier ===
First round
(United States) Jolene Watanabe	6	6
(Czech Republic) Nikola Hübnerová	2	2
(Romania) Cătălina Cristea	6	7
(United Kingdom) Monique Javer	1	5
(United States) Sandra Cacic	6	2	5
6	(United States) Kimberly Po	4	6	7

Second round
4	(Thailand) Tamarine Tanasugarn	6	3	6
(United States) Jolene Watanabe	1	6	2
(Romania) Cătălina Cristea	3	6	3
6	(United States) Kimberly Po	6	3	6

Qualifying competition
4	(Thailand) Tamarine Tanasugarn	6	6
6	(United States) Kimberly Po	3	1

=== Third qualifier ===
First round
7	(United States) Meghann Shaughnessy	7^{7}	6
(United States) Melissa Mazzotta	6^{1}	0
(United States) Meilen Tu	3	6	7^{7}
(Chinese Taipei) Janet Lee	6	4	6^{3}
(Slovenia) Tina Križan	6	6
(United States) Leslie Cavanaugh	0	1

Second round
7	(United States) Meghann Shaughnessy	6^{1}	4
(United States) Meilen Tu	7^{7}	6
(Slovenia) Tina Križan	6	3	3
3	(Canada) Maureen Drake	4	6	6

Qualifying competition
(United States) Meilen Tu	2	5
3	(Canada) Maureen Drake	6	7

=== Fourth qualifier ===
First round
5	(United States) Jane Chi	2	6	6
(Bulgaria) Magdalena Maleeva	6	3	1
(Japan) Rika Hiraki
(United States) Julie Smith	w/o
WC	(United States) Amanda Augustus	6^{3}	6	3
(Germany) Julia Abe	7^{7}	4	6

Second round
5	(United States) Jane Chi	6	6
(United States) Julie Smith	2	1
(Germany) Julia Abe	1	0
2	(Colombia) Fabiola Zuluaga	6	6

Qualifying competition
5	(United States) Jane Chi	2	5
2	(Colombia) Fabiola Zuluaga	6	7
