= 2007 Orange Prokom Open – Singles =

Singles
- 2007 Orange Prokom Open

Final
- Champion: (Spain) Tommy Robredo
- Runner-up: (Argentina) José Acasuso
- Score: 7–5, 6–0

Details
- Draw: 32 (4Q / 3WC)
- Seeds: 8

Events
Singles	Doubles
- Orange Prokom Open

Second-seeded Tommy Robredo defeated José Acasuso 7–5, 6–0 to win the 2007 Orange Prokom Open singles event.

== Seeds ==
1. (Russia) Nikolay Davydenko (second round, retired)
2. (Spain) Tommy Robredo (champion)
3. (Argentina) Juan Ignacio Chela (first round)
4. (Italy) Filippo Volandri (first round)
5. (Argentina) Agustín Calleri (first round)
6. (Spain) Nicolás Almagro (first round)
7. (Germany) Florian Mayer (quarterfinals)
8. (Italy) Potito Starace (first round)

== Draws ==
=== Key ===
- Q - Qualifier
- WC - Wild Card
- SE - Special Exempt
- LL - Lucky loser
- r - Retired

=== Finals ===
Semifinals
(Spain) A Montañés	1	2
(Argentina) J Acasuso	6	6
(France) G Simon	3	6^{4}
2	(Spain) T Robredo	6	7^{7}

Final
(Argentina) J Acasuso	5	0
2	(Spain) T Robredo	7	6

=== Top half ===
First round
1	(Russia) N Davydenko	6	6
SE	(Romania) A Pavel	3	4
(Argentina) M Vassallo Argüello	2	6	6
Q	(Argentina) M González	6	3	2
(Spain) A Montañés	6	6
(Argentina) D Hartfield	1	3
(Argentina) M Zabaleta	6	7
6	(Spain) N Almagro	3	5
3	(Argentina) JI Chela	1	2
(Argentina) S Roitman	6	6
(Argentina) J Acasuso	6	6
(Austria) W Eschauer	2	3
Q	(France) O Patience	7^{7}	6
WC	(Poland) D Olejniczak	6^{0}	4
LL	(Argentina) JP Brzezicki	3	3
7	(Germany) F Mayer	6	6

Second round
1	(Russia) N Davydenko	6	3	1^{r}
(Argentina) M Vassallo Argüello	2	6	2
(Spain) A Montañés	4	6	7
(Argentina) M Zabaleta	6	3	5
(Argentina) S Roitman	4	4
(Argentina) J Acasuso	6	6
Q	(France) O Patience	1	1
7	(Germany) F Mayer	6	6

Quarterfinals
(Argentina) M Vassallo Argüello	6	4	2
(Spain) A Montañés	2	6	6
(Argentina) J Acasuso	7^{7}	6
7	(Germany) F Mayer	6^{4}	3

Semifinals
(Spain) A Montañés	1	2
(Argentina) J Acasuso	6	6

=== Bottom half ===
First round
8	(Italy) P Starace	7^{7}	2	1^{r}
Q	(Serbia) B Pašanski	6^{4}	6	3
(France) G Simon	6	7^{8}
SE	(Serbia) V Troicki	0	6^{6}
(Ecuador) N Lapentti	0	4
(Russia) I Andreev	6	6
WC	(Poland) M Przysiężny	6	2	7
4	(Italy) F Volandri	4	6	5
5	(Argentina) A Calleri	6	6^{3}	5
(Austria) S Koubek	0	7^{7}	7
(Belgium) K Vliegen	6	6^{8}	6
(Peru) L Horna	2	7^{10}	3
(Chile) N Massú	7^{10}	6^{0}	4
Q	(Belgium) S Darcis	6^{8}	7^{7}	6
WC	(Poland) Ł Kubot	4	7	5
2	(Spain) T Robredo	6	5	7

Second round
Q	(Serbia) B Pašanski	4	6	3
(France) G Simon	6	4	6
(Russia) I Andreev	7	6
WC	(Poland) M Przysiężny	5	4
(Austria) S Koubek	6	3	6
(Belgium) K Vliegen	2	6	4
Q	(Belgium) S Darcis	6	0	5
2	(Spain) T Robredo	1	6	7

Quarterfinals
(France) G Simon	6	7
(Russia) I Andreev	4	5
(Austria) S Koubek	7	4	1
2	(Spain) T Robredo	5	6	6

Semifinals
(France) G Simon	3	6^{4}
2	(Spain) T Robredo	6	7^{7}
