= 1999 Bank of the West Classic – Doubles =

Doubles
- 1999 Bank of the West Classic

Final
- Champions: (United States) Lindsay Davenport (United States) Corina Morariu
- Runners-up: (Russia) Anna Kournikova (Russia) Elena Likhovtseva
- Score: 6–4, 6–4

Details
- Draw: 16
- Seeds: 4

Events
| Singles | Doubles |
| ← 1998 · | Bank of the West Classic | · 2000 → |

The 1999 Bank of the West Classic doubles was the doubles event of the twenty-eighth edition of the first tournament in the US Open Series.

Lindsay Davenport and Natasha Zvereva were the defending champions, but Zvereva did not compete this year. Davenport partnered up with Corina Morariu, and won her fifth Bank of the West Classic title in six years.

== Seeds ==
1. (Russia) Anna Kournikova / (Russia) Elena Likhovtseva (final)
2. (United States) Lindsay Davenport / (United States) Corina Morariu (champions)
3. (United States) Mary Joe Fernández / (United States) Lisa Raymond (semifinals)
4. (Romania) Irina Spîrlea / (Netherlands) Caroline Vis (first round)

== Draw ==
=== Key ===
- Q = Qualifier
- WC = Wild card
- LL = Lucky loser
- Alt = Alternate
- SE = Special exempt
- PR = Protected ranking
- ITF = ITF entry
- JE = Junior exempt
- w/o = Walkover
- r = Retired
- d = Defaulted
- SR = Special ranking

First round
1 | (Russia) A Kournikova (Russia) E Likhovtseva | 6^{9} | 6 | 7^{7}
(Romania) C Cristea (Germany) A Huber | 7^{11} | 4 | 6^{5}
Q | (Canada) M Drake (Australia) L Pleming | 4 | 6 | 4
(United States) A Frazier (United States) K Schlukebir | 6 | 2 | 6
4 | (Romania) I Spîrlea (Japan) C Vis | 1 | 6 | 2
(Zimbabwe) C Black (Australia) A Molik | 6 | 4 | 6
(Australia) K Kunce (France) A-G Sidot | 5 | 1
(South Africa) A Coetzer (United States) K Po | 7 | 6
(Austria) B Schett (Switzerland) P Schnyder | 2 | 1
(United States) C Rubin (France) S Testud | 6 | 6
(Slovenia) T Križan (Slovenia) K Srebotnik | 2 | 2
3 | (United States) MJ Fernández (United States) L Raymond | 6 | 6
(Thailand) T Tanasugarn (Ukraine) E Tatarkova | 6 | 6
(Spain) C Martínez (Argentina) P Tarabini | 4 | 4
WC | (Croatia) M Lučić (Latvia) L Neiland | 3 | 6 | 3
2 | (United States) L Davenport (United States) C Morariu | 6 | 3 | 6

Quarterfinals
1 | (Russia) A Kournikova (Russia) E Likhovtseva | 6 | 6
(United States) A Frazier (United States) K Schlukebir | 2 | 2
(Zimbabwe) C Black (Australia) A Molik | 4 | 2
(South Africa) A Coetzer (United States) K Po | 6 | 6
(United States) C Rubin (France) S Testud | 3 | 4
3 | (United States) MJ Fernández (United States) L Raymond | 6 | 6
(Thailand) T Tanasugarn (Ukraine) E Tatarkova | 2 | 1
2 | (United States) L Davenport (United States) C Morariu | 6 | 6

Semifinals
1 | (Russia) A Kournikova (Russia) E Likhovtseva | 6 | 6
(South Africa) A Coetzer (United States) K Po | 2 | 1
3 | (United States) MJ Fernández (United States) L Raymond | 6 | 4 | 3
2 | (United States) L Davenport (United States) C Morariu | 1 | 6 | 6

Final
1 | (Russia) A Kournikova (Russia) E Likhovtseva | 4 | 4
2 | (United States) L Davenport (United States) C Morariu | 6 | 6

== Qualifying ==
=== Seeds ===
1. (Canada) Maureen Drake / (Australia) Louise Pleming (Qualifiers)
2. (Chinese Taipei) Janet Lee / (Bulgaria) Pavlina Stoyanova (first round)

=== Qualifiers ===
1. (Canada) Maureen Drake / (Australia) Louise Pleming

== Qualifying draw ==
=== Key ===
- Q = Qualifier
- WC = Wild card
- LL = Lucky loser
- Alt = Alternate
- SE = Special exempt
- PR = Protected ranking
- ITF = ITF entry
- JE = Junior exempt
- w/o = Walkover
- r = Retired
- d = Defaulted
- SR = Special ranking

First round
1 | (Canada) Maureen Drake (Australia) Louise Pleming | 8
(South Africa) Kim Grant (United States) Mashona Washington | 6
(United States) Amanda Augustus (United States) Rebecca Jensen
(Luxembourg) Anne Kremer (United States) Meilen Tu | w/o
(United States) Jane Chi (United States) Jolene Watanabe | 0
(Czech Republic) Nikola Hübnerová (United States) Julie Smith | 8
WC | (United States) Melissa Mazzotta (Colombia) Fabiola Zuluaga | 8
2 | (Chinese Taipei) Janet Lee (Bulgaria) Pavlina Stoyanova | 4

Second round
1 | (Canada) Maureen Drake (Australia) Louise Pleming | 8
(Luxembourg) Anne Kremer (United States) Meilen Tu | 1
(Czech Republic) Nikola Hübnerová (United States) Julie Smith | 8
WC | (United States) Melissa Mazzotta (Colombia) Fabiola Zuluaga | 3

Qualifying competition
1 | (Canada) Maureen Drake (Australia) Louise Pleming | 8
(Czech Republic) Nikola Hübnerová (United States) Julie Smith | 6
