= 1999 Pilot Pen Tennis – Doubles =

Doubles
- 1999 Pilot Pen Tennis

Final
- Champions: (United States) Lisa Raymond (Australia) Rennae Stubbs
- Runners-up: (Russia) Elena Likhovtseva (Czech Republic) Jana Novotná
- Score: 7–6^{(7–1)}, 6–2

Details
- Draw: 16
- Seeds: 4

Events
Singles	Doubles
← 1998 ·	Pilot Pen Tennis	· 2000 →

The 1999 Pilot Pen Tennis doubles was the doubles event of the seventeenth edition of the final tournament in the US Open Series. Alexandra Fusai and Nathalie Tauziat were the reigning champions but Fusai did not compete this year. Tauziat played with Anne-Gaëlle Sidot as the fourth seed, and they were defeated in the first time by Kristine Kunce and Dominique Van Roost.

Lisa Raymond and Rennae Stubbs won the title, defeating third seeds Elena Likhovtseva and the previous year's finalist Jana Novotná in the final.

== Seeds ==
1. (Russia) Elena Likhovtseva / (Czech Republic) Jana Novotná (final)
2. (United States) Lisa Raymond / (Australia) Rennae Stubbs (champions)
3. (South Africa) Mariaan de Swardt / (Ukraine) Elena Tatarkova (quarterfinals)
4. (France) Anne-Gaëlle Sidot / (France) Nathalie Tauziat (first round)

== Draw ==
=== Key ===
- Q = Qualifier
- WC = Wild card
- LL = Lucky loser
- Alt = Alternate
- ITF = ITF entry
- PR = Protected ranking
- SR = Special ranking
- SE = Special exempt
- JE = Junior exempt
- JR = Junior Accelerator Programme entrant
- CO = College Accelerator Programme entrant
- NG = Next Gen Accelerator Program entrant
- w/o = Walkover
- r = Retired
- d = Defaulted

First round
1	(Russia) E Likhovtseva (Czech Republic) J Novotná	6	6
(Italy) R Grande (Australia) N Pratt	2	4
(France) J Halard-Decugis (Netherlands) M Oremans	6	3	6
(Italy) S Farina (Slovakia) K Habšudová	4	6	3
3	(South Africa) M de Swardt (Ukraine) E Tatarkova	6	4	6
(South Africa) A Coetzer (Argentina) I Gorrochategui	1	6	3
(Latvia) L Neiland (Slovenia) K Srebotnik	6	5	6
(France) A Dechaume-Balleret (France) É Loit	3	7	0
(Czech Republic) K Hrdličková (Germany) B Rittner	7	6
WC	(United States) T Snyder (United States) A Steveson	5	2
(Australia) K Kunce (Belgium) D Van Roost	4	6	6
4	(France) A-G Sidot (France) N Tauziat	6	3	4
(Hungary) R Kuti-Kis (Germany) M Weingärtner	6	0	6
(Zimbabwe) C Black (Australia) A Molik	4	6	4
(Spain) V Ruano Pascual (Argentina) P Suárez	3	5
2	(United States) L Raymond (Australia) R Stubbs	6	7

Quarterfinals
1	(Russia) E Likhovtseva (Czech Republic) J Novotná	w/o
(France) J Halard-Decugis (Netherlands) M Oremans
3	(South Africa) M de Swardt (Ukraine) E Tatarkova	2	6	4
(Latvia) L Neiland (Slovenia) K Srebotnik	6	4	6
(Czech Republic) K Hrdličková (Germany) B Rittner	6	6
(Australia) K Kunce (Belgium) D Van Roost	2	4
(Hungary) R Kuti-Kis (Germany) M Weingärtner	1	1
2	(United States) L Raymond (Australia) R Stubbs	6	6

Semifinals
1	(Russia) E Likhovtseva (Czech Republic) J Novotná	6	7^{9}
(Latvia) L Neiland (Slovenia) K Srebotnik	4	6^{7}
(Czech Republic) K Hrdličková (Germany) B Rittner	2	1
2	(United States) L Raymond (Australia) R Stubbs	6	6

Final
1	(Russia) E Likhovtseva (Czech Republic) J Novotná	6^{1}	2
2	(United States) L Raymond (Australia) R Stubbs	7^{7}	6
