= 2007 Orange Prokom Open – Doubles =

Doubles
- 2007 Orange Prokom Open

Final
- Champions: (Poland) Mariusz Fyrstenberg (Poland) Marcin Matkowski
- Runners-up: (Argentina) Martín García (Argentina) Sebastián Prieto
- Score: 6–1, 6–1

Details
- Draw: 16
- Seeds: 4

Events
Singles	Doubles
- Orange Prokom Open

František Čermák and Leoš Friedl were the defending champions, but chose not to defend their title.

Mariusz Fyrstenberg and Marcin Matkowski won the title defeating Martín García and Sebastián Prieto in the final, 6–1, 6–1.

== Seeds ==
1. (Poland) Mariusz Fyrstenberg / (Poland) Marcin Matkowski (champions)
2. (Argentina) Martín García / (Argentina) Sebastián Prieto (final)
3. (Poland) Łukasz Kubot / (Austria) Oliver Marach (semifinals)
4. (Czech Republic) Tomáš Cibulec / (Czech Republic) Petr Pála (first round)

== Draw ==
Key

- Q = Qualifier
- WC = Wild card
- LL = Lucky loser
- Alt = Alternate
- ITF = ITF entry
- PR = Protected ranking
- SR = Special ranking
- SE = Special exempt
- JE = Junior exempt
- JR = Junior Accelerator Programme entrant
- CO = College Accelerator Programme entrant
- NG = Next Gen Accelerator Program entrant
- w/o = Walkover
- r = Retired
- d = Defaulted

First round
1	(Poland) M Fyrstenberg (Poland) M Matkowski	7^{7}	6
(Sweden) R Lindstedt (Belgium) K Vliegen	6^{4}	4
WC	(Poland) D Olejniczak (Poland) M Przysiężny	7^{7}	3	[10]
WC	(Poland) A Chadaj (Poland) M Gawron	6^{3}	6	[8]
3	(Poland) Ł Kubot (Austria) O Marach	6	5	[10]
(Russia) I Andreev (Russia) Y Schukin	3	7	[8]
(Poland) T Bednarek (Czech Republic) D Škoch	6	7
(Argentina) JP Brzezicki (Argentina) A Calleri	2	5
(Switzerland) J-C Scherrer (Croatia) L Zovko	3	6	[10]
(Argentina) M González (Spain) A Montañés	6	1	[4]
(Argentina) G Gaudio (Chile) N Massú	6	6
4	(Czech Republic) T Cibulec (Czech Republic) P Pála	4	4
(United States) H Armando (Uruguay) P Cuevas	6	4	[10]
(Netherlands) J Smit (Netherlands) M van Haasteren	3	6	[7]
(Argentina) D Junqueira (Argentina) M Zabaleta	2	1
2	(Argentina) M García (Argentina) S Prieto	6	6

Quarterfinals
1	(Poland) M Fyrstenberg (Poland) M Matkowski	6	7^{7}
WC	(Poland) D Olejniczak (Poland) M Przysiężny	2	6^{5}
3	(Poland) Ł Kubot (Austria) O Marach	6	7^{7}
(Poland) T Bednarek (Czech Republic) D Škoch	1	6^{2}
(Switzerland) J-C Scherrer (Croatia) L Zovko	6	6
(Argentina) G Gaudio (Chile) N Massú	4	3
(United States) H Armando (Uruguay) P Cuevas	2	6^{4}
2	(Argentina) M García (Argentina) S Prieto	6	7^{7}

Semifinals
1	(Poland) M Fyrstenberg (Poland) M Matkowski	6	4	[10]
3	(Poland) Ł Kubot (Austria) O Marach	4	6	[8]
(Switzerland) J-C Scherrer (Croatia) L Zovko	3	4
2	(Argentina) M García (Argentina) S Prieto	6	6

Final
1	(Poland) M Fyrstenberg (Poland) M Matkowski	6	6
2	(Argentina) M García (Argentina) S Prieto	1	1
