= 2007 Orange Prokom Open =

- Date: 30 July – 6 August
- Edition: 10th
- Category: International Series
- Draw: 32S / 16D
- Prize money: € 425,250
- Surface: Clay / outdoor
- Location: Sopot, Poland

Champions

Singles
- (Spain) Tommy Robredo

Doubles
- (Poland) Mariusz Fyrstenberg / (Poland) Marcin Matkowski
← 2006 ·	Orange Prokom Open	· 2008 →

The 2007 Orange Prokom Open was the tenth edition of this men's tennis tournament and was played on outdoor clay courts. The tournament was part of the International Series of the 2007 ATP Tour. It took place in Sopot, Poland from 30 July through 6 August 2007. Tommy Robredo won the singles title.

== Betting controversy ==
Nikolay Davydenko, then world number 4, was questioned under suspicion of match fixing after his unexpected second round loss to world number 87 Martín Vassallo Argüello, 2–6, 6–3, 2–1 by retirement. Online betting company Betfair reported its suspicions to the game's governing body, the Association of Tennis Professionals, after irregular betting patterns occurred. Betfair took the unprecedented step of voiding all bets on the match, with came to a sum of around £3.6m, ten times the usual amount for a match at this level. Argüello's odds to win the match also rocketed early in the second set, despite being in a losing position. Davydenko retired with a foot injury and called the trainer out towards the end of the second set.

== Finals ==
=== Singles ===
(Spain) Tommy Robredo defeated (Argentina) José Acasuso, 7–5, 6–0

- It was Robredo's first title of the year and the fifth of his career.

=== Doubles ===
(Poland) Mariusz Fyrstenberg / (Poland) Marcin Matkowski defeated (Argentina) Martín García / (Argentina) Sebastián Prieto, 6–1, 6–1
