= 1999 TIG Classic – Singles =

Singles
- 1999 TIG Classic

Final
- Champion: (Switzerland) Martina Hingis
- Runner-up: (United States) Venus Williams
- Score: 6–4, 6–0

Details
- Draw: 28
- Seeds: 8

Events
Singles	Doubles
- Southern California Open

The 1999 TIG Classic singles was the singles event of the twentieth edition of the second tournament in the US Open Series.

Lindsay Davenport was the defending champion, but she was defeated in the semifinals by Venus Williams. Martina Hingis then defeated Williams in the final to claim her second San Diego title.

This tournament is notable for featuring the last match of 22 time grand slam champion Steffi Graf. Graf withdrew from her opening match against Amy Frazier early in the third set. She was struggling with her hamstring and thigh. After years of battling with injury woes, she officially retired from professional tennis soon after.

== Seeds ==
1. (United States) Lindsay Davenport (semifinals)
2. (Switzerland) Martina Hingis (champion)
3. (Germany) Steffi Graf (second round)
4. (United States) Venus Williams (final)
5. (France) Mary Pierce (first round)
6. (Spain) Arantxa Sánchez Vicario (second round)
7. (South Africa) Amanda Coetzer (semifinals)
8. (France) Nathalie Tauziat (first round)

== Draw ==
Key

- Q = Qualifier
- WC = Wild card
- LL = Lucky loser
- Alt = Alternate
- ITF = ITF entry
- PR = Protected ranking
- SR = Special ranking
- SE = Special exempt
- JE = Junior exempt
- JR = Junior Accelerator Programme entrant
- CO = College Accelerator Programme entrant
- NG = Next Gen Accelerator Program entrant
- w/o = Walkover
- r = Retired
- d = Defaulted

=== Finals ===
Semifinals
1	(United States) Lindsay Davenport	4	5
4	(United States) Venus Williams	6	7
7	(South Africa) Amanda Coetzer	1	2
2	(Switzerland) Martina Hingis	6	6

Final
4	(United States) Venus Williams	4	0
2	(Switzerland) Martina Hingis	6	6

=== Top half ===
First round
(Romania) I Spîrlea	6	6
(Austria) S Plischke	2	1
(Spain) C Martínez	4	3
(Austria) B Schett	6	6
Q	(Germany) A Huber	6	6
8	(France) N Tauziat	3	1
(Belarus) N Zvereva	6	6
Q	(Colombia) F Zuluaga	2	1
(France) A Mauresmo	4	0
(France) S Testud	6	6
(Russia) E Likhovtseva	2	6	4
6	(Spain) A Sánchez Vicario	6	1	6

Second round
1	(United States) L Davenport	6	6
(Romania) I Spîrlea	0	2
(Austria) B Schett	7	4	3
Q	(Germany) A Huber	5	6	6
4	(United States) V Williams	7	6
(Belarus) N Zvereva	5	1
(France) S Testud	6	7
6	(Spain) A Sánchez Vicario	2	5

Quarterfinals
1	(United States) L Davenport	7	7
Q	(Germany) A Huber	5	5
4	(United States) V Williams	7	6
(France) S Testud	5	1

Semifinals
1	(United States) L Davenport	4	5
4	(United States) V Williams	6	7

=== Bottom half ===
First round
7	(South Africa) A Coetzer	6^{7}	6	6
WC	(United States) L Raymond	7^{9}	1	1
Q	(United States) M Tu	2	6^{3}
(Russia) A Kournikova	6	7^{7}
(United States) A Frazier	6	7^{7}
(Switzerland) P Schnyder	4	6^{4}
5	(France) M Pierce	3	6	1
LL	(Japan) A Sugiyama	6	4	6
Q	(Canada) M Drake	3	5
(Belgium) D Van Roost	6	7
WC	(France) J Halard-Decugis	6^{3}	2
(United States) C Rubin	7^{7}	6

Second round
7	(South Africa) A Coetzer	6	1	6
(Russia) A Kournikova	0	6	1
(United States) A Frazier	4	7	2
3	(Germany) S Graf	6	5	1^{r}
LL	(Japan) A Sugiyama	2	4
(Belgium) D Van Roost	6	6
(United States) C Rubin	5	3
2	(Switzerland) M Hingis	7	6

Quarterfinals
7	(South Africa) A Coetzer	7	6
(United States) A Frazier	5	1
(Belgium) D Van Roost	2	4
2	(Switzerland) M Hingis	6	6

Semifinals
7	(South Africa) A Coetzer	1	2
2	(Switzerland) M Hingis	6	6

== Qualifying ==
=== Seeds ===
1. n.a.
2. (Germany) Anke Huber (qualifier)
3. (Japan) Ai Sugiyama (qualifying competition, lucky loser)
4. (Luxembourg) Anne Kremer (second round)
5. (United States) Corina Morariu (first round, withdrew)
6. (Puerto Rico) Kristina Brandi (first round, withdrew)
7. (Zimbabwe) Cara Black (second round)
8. (France) Anne-Gaëlle Sidot (qualifying competition)
9. (Colombia) Fabiola Zuluaga (qualifier)

=== Qualifiers ===
1. (Colombia) Fabiola Zuluaga
2. (Canada) Maureen Drake
3. (United States) Meilen Tu
4. (Germany) Anke Huber

=== Lucky loser ===
1. (Japan) Ai Sugiyama

== Qualifying draw ==
Key

- Q = Qualifier
- WC = Wild card
- LL = Lucky loser
- Alt = Alternate
- ITF = ITF entry
- PR = Protected ranking
- SR = Special ranking
- SE = Special exempt
- JE = Junior exempt
- JR = Junior Accelerator Programme entrant
- CO = College Accelerator Programme entrant
- NG = Next Gen Accelerator Program entrant
- w/o = Walkover
- r = Retired
- d = Defaulted

=== First qualifier ===
First round
9	(Colombia) Fabiola Zuluaga	7	7
(United States) Jane Chi	5	5
(Ukraine) Elena Tatarkova	6	6
(Latvia) Larisa Neiland	0	1
(Thailand) Tamarine Tanasugarn	6	6
(United States) Mashona Washington	2	4
WC	(Mexico) Angélica Gavaldón	w/o
6	(Puerto Rico) Kristina Brandi

Second round
9	(Colombia) Fabiola Zuluaga	1	6	6
(Ukraine) Elena Tatarkova	6	4	2
(Thailand) Tamarine Tanasugarn	1	6	2
WC	(Mexico) Angélica Gavaldón	6	3	6

Qualifying competition
9	(Colombia) Fabiola Zuluaga	6	6
WC	(Mexico) Angélica Gavaldón	3	1

=== Second qualifier ===
First round
4	(Luxembourg) Anne Kremer	6	6
(Bulgaria) Pavlina Stoyanova	4	2
(Canada) Maureen Drake	6	6
(United States) Melissa Mazzotta	0	0
(United States) Meghann Shaughnessy	6^{6}	4
(Slovenia) Katarina Srebotnik	7^{8}	6
(United States) Kimberly Po	6	0	3
7	(Zimbabwe) Cara Black	2	6	6

Second round
4	(Luxembourg) Anne Kremer	0	5
(Canada) Maureen Drake	6	7
(Slovenia) Katarina Srebotnik	6	6
7	(Zimbabwe) Cara Black	3	4

Qualifying competition
(Canada) Maureen Drake	6	3	6
(Slovenia) Katarina Srebotnik	4	6	4

=== Third qualifier ===
First round
5	(United States) Corina Morariu
(United States) Meilen Tu	w/o
(Canada) Martina Nejedly	2	1
(Romania) Cătălina Cristea	6	6
(Russia) Tatiana Panova	6	4	6
(Japan) Nana Miyagi	2	6	3
(Croatia) Iva Majoli	6	2	4
3	(Japan) Ai Sugiyama	4	6	6

Second round
(United States) Meilen Tu	6	6
(Romania) Cătălina Cristea	3	2
(Russia) Tatiana Panova	2	3
3	(Japan) Ai Sugiyama	6	6

Qualifying competition
(United States) Meilen Tu	3	7	6
3	(Japan) Ai Sugiyama	6	5	1

=== Fourth qualifier ===
First round
8	(France) Anne-Gaëlle Sidot	6	6
(Australia) Alicia Molik	2	3
(Germany) Julia Abe	6	6
(Slovenia) Tina Križan	1	4
(United States) Tu Dong	1	2
(Chinese Taipei) Janet Lee	6	6
WC	(United States) Allison Bradshaw	2	4
2	(Germany) Anke Huber	6	6

Second round
8	(France) Anne-Gaëlle Sidot	6	6
(Germany) Julia Abe	1	3
(Chinese Taipei) Janet Lee	3	6	4
2	(Germany) Anke Huber	6	2	6

Qualifying competition
8	(France) Anne-Gaëlle Sidot	6	6^{4}	4
2	(Germany) Anke Huber	3	7^{7}	6
