= 1999 Bank of the West Classic =

- Date: July 26 – August 1
- Edition: 28th
- Category: Tier II
- Draw: 32S/16D
- Prize money: $520,000
- Surface: Hard / outdoor
- Location: Stanford, California

Champions

Singles
- (United States) Lindsay Davenport

Doubles
- (United States) Lindsay Davenport / (United States) Corina Morariu
← 1998 ·	Bank of the West Classic	· 2000 →

The 1999 Bank of the West Classic was a women's tennis tournament played on outdoor hard courts in Stanford, California in the United States. It was part of Tier II of the 1999 WTA Tour. It was the 28th edition of the tournament and was held from July 26 through August 1, 1999. The singles title was won by Lindsay Davenport.

== Finals ==
=== Singles ===
(United States) Lindsay Davenport defeated (United States) Venus Williams, 7–6^{(7–1)}, 6–2

=== Doubles ===
(United States) Lindsay Davenport / (United States) Corina Morariu defeated (Russia) Anna Kournikova / (Russia) Elena Likhovtseva, 6–4, 6–4

== Entrants ==
=== Seeds ===
Country	Player	Rank	Seed
USA	Lindsay Davenport	1	1
USA	Venus Williams	4	2
RSA	Amanda Coetzer	9	4
AUT	Barbara Schett	12	5
RUS	Anna Kournikova	13	6
BEL	Dominique Van Roost	14	7
FRA	Sandrine Testud	17	8
ESP	Conchita Martínez	18	9

=== Other entrants ===
The following players received wildcards into the singles main draw:

- (Croatia) Iva Majoli

The following players received wildcards into the doubles main draw:

- (Croatia) Mirjana Lučić / (Latvia) Larisa Neiland

The following players received entry from the singles qualifying draw:

- (France) Anne-Gaëlle Sidot
- (Thailand) Tamarine Tanasugarn
- (Canada) Maureen Drake
- (Colombia) Fabiola Zuluaga

The following players received entry from the doubles qualifying draw:

- (Canada) Maureen Drake / (Australia) Louise Pleming
