= 1999 Prokom Polish Open =

- Date: 12–18 July
- Edition: 2nd
- Category: Tier III
- Draw: 30S / 16D
- Prize money: $180,000
- Surface: Clay / outdoor
- Location: Sopot, Poland

Champions

Singles
- (Spain) Conchita Martínez

Doubles
- (Argentina) Laura Montalvo / (Argentina) Paola Suárez
← 1998 ·	Prokom Polish Open	· 2000 →

The 1999 Prokom Polish Open was a women's tennis tournament played on outdoor clay courts in Sopot, Poland that was part of the Tier III category of the 1999 WTA Tour. It was the second edition of the Prokom Polish Open and took place from 12 July until 18 July 1999. Third-seeded Conchita Martínez won the singles title and earned $27,000 first-prize money.

== Finals ==
=== Singles ===
(Spain) Conchita Martínez defeated (Slovakia) Karina Habšudová, 6–1, 6–1

- It was Martínez's 31st singles career title and her only in 1999.

=== Doubles ===
(Argentina) Laura Montalvo / (Argentina) Paola Suárez defeated (Spain) Gala León García / (Spain) María Sánchez Lorenzo, 6–4, 6–3

== Entrants ==
=== Seeds ===
Country	Player	Rank	Seed
ESP	Arantxa Sánchez Vicario	8	1
FRA	Sandrine Testud	17	2
ESP	Conchita Martínez	18	3
BLR	Natasha Zvereva	22	4
ITA	Silvia Farina	23	5
SVK	Henrieta Nagyová	26	6
ISR	Anna Smashnova	39	7
ESP	Gala León García	49	8

=== Other entrants ===
The following players received wildcards into the singles main draw:

- (Poland) Aleksandra Olsza
- (Poland) Anna Żarska
- (Poland) Magdalena Grzybowska

The following players received wildcards into the doubles main draw:

- (Poland) Magdalena Grzybowska / (France) Amélie Cocheteux

The following players received entry from the singles qualifying draw:

- (Spain) Eva Bes
- (Slovakia) Ľudmila Cervanová
- (Federal Republic of Yugoslavia) Sandra Naćuk
- (Croatia) Jelena Kostanić

The following players received entry from the doubles qualifying draw:

- (Spain) Gala León García / (Spain) María Sánchez Lorenzo
