= 1999 Advanta Championships of Philadelphia – Singles =

Singles
- 1999 Advanta Championships of Philadelphia

Final
- Champion: (United States) Lindsay Davenport
- Runner-up: (Switzerland) Martina Hingis
- Score: 6–3, 6–4

Details
- Draw: 28
- Seeds: 8

Events
Singles	Doubles
- Advanta Championships of Philadelphia

The 1999 Advanta Championships of Philadelphia singles was the tennis singles event of the seventeenth edition of the Advanta Championships of Philadelphia; a WTA Tier II tournament held in Philadelphia. Steffi Graf was the defending champion but retired after Wimbledon earlier in the year.

After losing in last year's final, World No. 2 Lindsay Davenport won the title this year, defeating World No. 1 Martina Hingis, 6–3, 6–4.

== Seeds ==
The top four seeds received a bye to the second round.

1. (Switzerland) Martina Hingis (final)
2. (United States) Lindsay Davenport (champion)
3. (United States) Venus Williams (semifinals)
4. (France) Nathalie Tauziat (semifinals)
5. (France) Julie Halard-Decugis (quarterfinals)
6. (South Africa) Amanda Coetzer (quarterfinals)
7. (Belgium) Dominique Van Roost (second round)
8. (Russia) Anna Kournikova (first round)

== Draw ==
Key

- Q = Qualifier
- WC = Wild card
- LL = Lucky loser
- Alt = Alternate
- ITF = ITF entry
- PR = Protected ranking
- SR = Special ranking
- SE = Special exempt
- JE = Junior exempt
- JR = Junior Accelerator Programme entrant
- CO = College Accelerator Programme entrant
- NG = Next Gen Accelerator Program entrant
- w/o = Walkover
- r = Retired
- d = Defaulted

=== Finals ===
Semifinals
1	(Switzerland) Martina Hingis	6	6
4	(France) Nathalie Tauziat	4	2
3	(United States) Venus Williams	1	2
2	(United States) Lindsay Davenport	6	6

Final
1	(Switzerland) Martina Hingis	3	4
2	(United States) Lindsay Davenport	6	6

=== Top half ===
First round
(Israel) A Smashnova	4	4
(United States) C Rubin	6	6
(United States) A Frazier	6	6
Q	(United States) M Irvin	1	2
WC	(Belgium) J Henin	7	6
8	(Russia) A Kournikova	6	2
(United States) J Capriati	7	6
WC	(Belgium) K Clijsters	5	3
(Slovakia) H Nagyová	6	6
LL	(Netherlands) S Noorlander	0	3
(United States) L Raymond	4	7	6
6	(South Africa) A Coetzer	6	5	3

Second round
1	(Switzerland) M Hingis	6	6
(United States) C Rubin	3	0
(United States) A Frazier	7	6
WC	(Belgium) J Henin	5	4
4	(France) N Tauziat	6	3	7
(United States) J Capriati	4	6	5
(Slovakia) H Nagyová	6	3	3
(United States) L Raymond	2	6	6

Quarterfinals
1	(Switzerland) M Hingis	7	6
(United States) A Frazier	6	4
4	(France) N Tauziat	7	6
(United States) L Raymond	6	4

Semifinals
1	(Switzerland) M Hingis	6	6
4	(France) N Tauziat	4	2

=== Bottom half ===
First round
7	(Belgium) D Van Roost	6	6
(Russia) E Likhovtseva	1	2
Q	(United States) J Craybas	6	2
(France) S Testud	7	6
WC	(Zimbabwe) C Black	3	5
Q	(Czech Republic) D Bedáňová	6	7
5	(France) J Halard-Decugis	7	6
(Spain) C Martínez	5	2
(Romania) I Spîrlea	6	6	2
Q	(Venezuela) M Vento	3	7	6
(Germany) A Huber	5	6	1
(United States) A Stevenson	7	2	6

Second round
7	(Belgium) D Van Roost	4	4
(France) S Testud	6	6
WC	(Czech Republic) D Bedáňová	4	1
3	(United States) V Williams	6	6
5	(France) J Halard-Decugis	6	6
Q	(Venezuela) M Vento	1	4
(United States) A Stevenson	2	3
2	(United States) L Davenport	6	6

Quarterfinals
(France) S Testud	1	6
3	(United States) V Williams	6	7
5	(France) J Halard-Decugis	6	2	1
2	(United States) L Davenport	4	6	6

Semifinals
3	(United States) V Williams	1	2
2	(United States) L Davenport	6	6

== Qualifying ==
=== Seeds ===
1. (Canada) Maureen Drake (first round)
2. (Switzerland) Emmanuelle Gagliardi (first round)
3. (United States) Lilia Osterloh (first round)
4. (Netherlands) Seda Noorlander (qualifying competition, lucky loser)
5. replaced by (Canada) Aneta Soukup (first round)
6. (United States) Jolene Watanabe (first round)
7. (Bulgaria) Pavlina Stoyanova (qualifying competition)
8. (United States) Samantha Reeves (second round)

=== Qualifiers ===
1. (United States) Jill Craybas
2. (United States) Marissa Irvin
3. (Venezuela) María Vento
4. (Czech Republic) Dája Bedáňová

=== Lucky losers ===
1. (Netherlands) Seda Noorlander

== Qualifying draw ==
Key

- Q = Qualifier
- WC = Wild card
- LL = Lucky loser
- Alt = Alternate
- ITF = ITF entry
- PR = Protected ranking
- SR = Special ranking
- SE = Special exempt
- JE = Junior exempt
- JR = Junior Accelerator Programme entrant
- CO = College Accelerator Programme entrant
- NG = Next Gen Accelerator Program entrant
- w/o = Walkover
- r = Retired
- d = Defaulted

=== First qualifier ===
First round
1	(Canada) Maureen Drake	4	1
(United States) Jill Craybas	6	6
(United States) Kimberly Po	4	3
(Romania) Cătălina Cristea	6	6
(South Africa) Surina De Beer	3	4
(Italy) Francesca Lubiani	6	6
(Canada) Martina Nejedly	6	1	5
7	(Bulgaria) Pavlina Stoyanova	3	6	7

Second round
(United States) Jill Craybas	6	6
(Romania) Cătălina Cristea	1	4
(Italy) Francesca Lubiani	4	7	3
7	(Bulgaria) Pavlina Stoyanova	6	5	6

Qualifying competition
(United States) Jill Craybas	6	3	7
7	(Bulgaria) Pavlina Stoyanova	0	6	6

=== Second qualifier ===
First round
4	(Netherlands) Seda Noorlander	6	6
Alt	(South Africa) Kim Grant	4	4
(United States) Jacqueline Trail	3	6
(Canada) Sonya Jeyaseelan	6	7
(Japan) Nana Miyagi	6	6
WC	(United States) Bethanie Mattek	2	2
(United States) Marissa Irvin	6	6
Alt	(Canada) Aneta Soukup	2	3

Second round
4	(Netherlands) Seda Noorlander	0	6	7
(Canada) Sonya Jeyaseelan	6	4	6
(Japan) Nana Miyagi	3	4
(United States) Marissa Irvin	6	6

Qualifying competition
4	(Netherlands) Seda Noorlander	3	3
(United States) Marissa Irvin	6	6

=== Third qualifier ===
First round
6	(United States) Jolene Watanabe	3	2
(Venezuela) María Vento	6	6
(Australia) Rennae Stubbs	6	6
Alt	(United States) Sylvia Schenck	0	1
(Canada) Renata Kolbovic	6	6
Alt	(United States) Leslie Cavanaugh	1	1
(United States) Mashona Washington	6	7
3	(United States) Lilia Osterloh	1	6

Second round
(Venezuela) María Vento	6	6
(Australia) Rennae Stubbs	4	4
(Canada) Renata Kolbovic	4	7	3
(United States) Mashona Washington	6	6	6

Qualifying competition
(Venezuela) María Vento	6	6
(United States) Mashona Washington	3	0

=== Fourth qualifier ===
First round
8/WC	(United States) Samantha Reeves	6	6
WC	(United States) Candice Fuchs	1	0
(United States) Sandra Cacic	4	3
(Germany) Vanessa Henke	6	6
(Germany) Adriana Barna	1	5
(Czech Republic) Dája Bedáňová	6	7
(United States) Tracy Singian	6	7
2	(Switzerland) Emmanuelle Gagliardi	6	4

Second round
8/WC	(United States) Samantha Reeves	6	6	4
(Germany) Vanessa Henke	7	1	6
(Czech Republic) Dája Bedáňová	6	6
(United States) Tracy Singian	3	4

Qualifying competition
(Germany) Vanessa Henke	3	1
(Czech Republic) Dája Bedáňová	6	6
