= 1999 Porsche Tennis Grand Prix =

- Date: 4–10 October
- Edition: 22nd
- Category: Tier II
- Draw: 28S / 16D
- Prize money: $520,000
- Surface: Hard / Indoor
- Location: Filderstadt, Germany
- Venue: Filderstadt Tennis Club

Champions

Singles
- (Switzerland) Martina Hingis

Doubles
- (United States) Chanda Rubin / (France) Sandrine Testud
- Porsche Tennis Grand Prix

The 1999 Porsche Tennis Grand Prix was a women's tennis tournament played on indoor hard courts in Filderstadt, Germany. that was part of Tier II of the 1999 WTA Tour. It was the 22nd edition of the tournament and was held from 4 October until 10 October 1999. First seeded Martina Hingis won the singles title, her third at the event after 1996 and 1997, and earned $80,000 first prize money.

== Finals ==
=== Singles ===
(Switzerland) Martina Hingis defeated (France) Mary Pierce, 6–4, 6–1

- This was Hingis' seventh title of the year.

=== Doubles ===
(United States) Chanda Rubin / (France) Sandrine Testud defeated (Spain) Arantxa Sánchez Vicario / (Latvia) Larisa Neiland, 6–3, 6–4

== Entrants ==
=== Seeds ===
Country	Player	Rank	Seed
SUI	Martina Hingis	1	1
USA	Lindsay Davenport	2	2
USA	Serena Williams	4	3
FRA	Mary Pierce	6	4
RSA	Amanda Coetzer	7	5
AUT	Barbara Schett	8	6
FRA	Julie Halard-Decugis	9	7
BEL	Dominique Van Roost	10	8

=== Other entrants ===
The following players received wildcards into the singles main draw:

- (United States) Mary Joe Fernández
- (United States) Jennifer Capriati
- (Germany) Anke Huber

The following players received wildcards into the doubles main draw:

- (Germany) Mia Buric / (Germany) Anke Huber

The following players received entry from the singles qualifying draw:

- (Belgium) Sabine Appelmans
- (Russia) Elena Dementieva
- (United States) Lisa Raymond
- (Italy) Silvia Farina Elia

The following players received entry as lucky losers:

- (Spain) Magüi Serna
- (France) Anne-Gaëlle Sidot

The following players received entry from the doubles qualifying draw:

- (Czech Republic) Květa Hrdličková / (Germany) Barbara Rittner

== Prize money ==
Event	W	F	SF	QF	Round of 16	Round of 32
Singles	$80,000	$40,000	$20,000	$10,000	$7,000	$3,700
