= 1999 Advanta Championships of Philadelphia – Doubles =

Doubles
- 1999 Advanta Championships of Philadelphia

Final
- Champions: (United States) Lisa Raymond (Australia) Rennae Stubbs
- Runners-up: (United States) Chanda Rubin (France) Sandrine Testud
- Score: 6–1, 7–6

Details
- Draw: 16
- Seeds: 4

Events
Singles	Doubles
- Advanta Championships of Philadelphia

The 1999 Advanta Championships of Philadelphia doubles was the tennis doubles event of the seventeenth edition of the Advanta Championships of Philadelphia; a WTA Tier II tournament held in Philadelphia, Pennsylvania. Elena Likhovtseva and Ai Sugiyama were the reigning champions, but Sugiyama did not compete this year. Likhovtseva competed with Amanda Coetzer, but were defeated in the quarterfinals by Lisa Raymond and Rennae Stubbs.

Raymond and Stubbs went on to win the title, defeating Chanda Rubin and Sandrine Testud in the final, 6–1, 7–6.

== Seeds ==
1. (United States) Lindsay Davenport / (United States) Corina Morariu (semifinals, retired)
2. (United States) Lisa Raymond / (Australia) Rennae Stubbs (champions)
3. (France) Alexandra Fusai / (France) Nathalie Tauziat (quarterfinals)
4. (Romania) Irina Spîrlea / (Netherlands) Caroline Vis (quarterfinals)

== Draw ==
Key

- Q = Qualifier
- WC = Wild card
- LL = Lucky loser
- Alt = Alternate
- ITF = ITF entry
- PR = Protected ranking
- SR = Special ranking
- SE = Special exempt
- JE = Junior exempt
- JR = Junior Accelerator Programme entrant
- CO = College Accelerator Programme entrant
- NG = Next Gen Accelerator Program entrant
- w/o = Walkover
- r = Retired
- d = Defaulted

First round
1	(United States) L Davenport (United States) C Morariu	7	6
(United States) L McNeil (United States) K Po	5	1
(Germany) A Huber (Russia) A Kournikova	6	6
(Canada) S Jeyaseelan (Netherlands) S Noorlander	7	7
4	(Romania) I Spîrlea (Netherlands) C Vis	w/o
Q	(United States) S Cacic (United States) L Osterloh
(United States) L Lee (United States) M Shaughnessy	1	0
(United States) C Rubin (France) S Testud	6	6
WC	(Belgium) K Clijsters (Belgium) J Henin	6	0	0
(Zimbabwe) C Black (United States) D Graham	3	6	6
(Spain) C Martínez (Argentina) P Tarabini	3	0
3	(France) A Fusai (France) N Tauziat	6	6
(South Africa) S de Beer (Japan) N Miyagi	5	2
(South Africa) A Coetzer (Russia) E Likhovtseva	7	6
(United States) A Frazier (United States) K Schlukebir	2	7	5
2	(United States) L Raymond (Australia) R Stubbs	6	5	7

Quarterfinals
1	(United States) L Davenport (United States) C Morariu	6	6
(Canada) S Jeyaseelan (Netherlands) S Noorlander	2	1
(Romania) I Spîrlea (Netherlands) C Vis	6	3	2
(United States) C Rubin (France) S Testud	4	6	6
(Zimbabwe) C Black (United States) D Graham	6	6
3	(France) A Fusai (France) N Tauziat	1	3
(South Africa) A Coetzer (Russia) E Likhovtseva	3	2
2	(United States) L Raymond (Australia) R Stubbs	6	6

Semifinals
1	(United States) L Davenport (United States) C Morariu
(United States) C Rubin (France) S Testud	w/o
(Zimbabwe) C Black (United States) D Graham	3	6
2	(United States) L Raymond (Australia) R Stubbs	6	7

Final
(United States) C Rubin (France) S Testud	1	6^{2}
2	(United States) L Raymond (Australia) R Stubbs	6	7

== Qualifying ==
=== Seeds ===
1. (United States) Sandra Cacic / (United States) Lilia Osterloh (qualified)
2. (United States) Samantha Reeves / (United States) Mashona Washington (qualifying competition, withdrew)

=== Qualifiers ===
1. (United States) Sandra Cacic / (United States) Lilia Osterloh

== Qualifying draw ==
Key

- Q = Qualifier
- WC = Wild card
- LL = Lucky loser
- Alt = Alternate
- ITF = ITF entry
- PR = Protected ranking
- SR = Special ranking
- SE = Special exempt
- JE = Junior exempt
- JR = Junior Accelerator Programme entrant
- CO = College Accelerator Programme entrant
- NG = Next Gen Accelerator Program entrant
- w/o = Walkover
- r = Retired
- d = Defaulted

First round
1	(United States) Sandra Cacic (United States) Lilia Osterloh
Bye
(South Africa) Kim Grant (United States) Tracy Singian	w/o
(Germany) Adriana Barna (Germany) Vanessa Henke
(Canada) Maureen Drake (Russia) Lioudmila Skavronskaia	w/o
(Canada) Renata Kolbovic (Canada) Martina Nejedly
Bye
2	(United States) Samantha Reeves (United States) Mashona Washington

Second round
1	(United States) Sandra Cacic (United States) Lilia Osterloh	w/o
(South Africa) Kim Grant (United States) Tracy Singian
(Canada) Maureen Drake (Russia) Lioudmila Skavronskaia
2	(United States) Samantha Reeves (United States) Mashona Washington	w/o

Qualifying competition
1	(United States) Sandra Cacic (United States) Lilia Osterloh	w/o
2	(United States) Samantha Reeves (United States) Mashona Washington
