= 1999 Prokom Polish Open – Doubles =

Doubles
- 1999 Prokom Polish Open

Final
- Champions: (Argentina) Laura Montalvo (Argentina) Paola Suárez
- Runners-up: (Spain) Gala León García (Spain) María Sánchez Lorenzo
- Score: 6–4, 6–3

Details
- Draw: 16
- Seeds: 4

Events
Singles	Doubles
- Prokom Polish Open

The 1999 Orange Prokom Open doubles was the doubles event of the second edition of the first women's tennis tournament held in Poland. Květa Hrdličková and Helena Vildová were the defending champions, but Hrdličková did not compete this year. Vildová therefore competed with Eva Melicharová, and was defeated in the first round by third seeds Cătălina Cristea and Ruxandra Dragomir.

Second seeds Laura Montalvo and Paola Suárez won the tournament, defeating qualifiers Gala León García and María Sánchez Lorenzo in the final, 6–4, 6–3.

== Seeds ==
1. (Spain) Conchita Martínez / (Argentina) Patricia Tarabini (semifinals)
2. (Argentina) Laura Montalvo / (Argentina) Paola Suárez (champions)
3. (Romania) Cătălina Cristea / (Romania) Ruxandra Dragomir (quarterfinals)
4. (France) Alexia Dechaume-Balleret / (France) Émilie Loit (semifinals)

== Draw ==
Key

- Q = Qualifier
- WC = Wild card
- LL = Lucky loser
- Alt = Alternate
- ITF = ITF entry
- PR = Protected ranking
- SR = Special ranking
- SE = Special exempt
- JE = Junior exempt
- JR = Junior Accelerator Programme entrant
- CO = College Accelerator Programme entrant
- NG = Next Gen Accelerator Program entrant
- w/o = Walkover
- r = Retired
- d = Defaulted

First round
1	(Spain) C Martínez (Argentina) P Tarabini	6	6
(Belarus) O Barabanschikova (Germany) B Rittner	2	3
(Croatia) J Kostanić (Federal Republic of Yugoslavia) S Naćuk	7^{7}
(Czech Republic) E Martincová (Czech Republic) L Němečková	6^{4}	r
3	(Romania) C Cristea (Romania) R Dragomir	6	6
(Czech Republic) E Melicharová (Czech Republic) H Vildová	2	0
WC	(France) A Cocheteux (Poland) M Grzybowska	2	6	2
Q	(Spain) G León García (Spain) M Sánchez Lorenzo	6	2	6
(Austria) B Schwartz (United States) M Shaughnessy	6	7
(Spain) E Bes (Spain) M Ramon Climent	4	5
(Belgium) S Appelmans (France) S Testud	2	6	4
4	(France) A Dechaume-Balleret (France) É Loit	6	3	6
(Slovakia) K Habšudová (Slovakia) H Nagyová	3	6^{3}
(Australia) A Molik (Russia) N Petrova	6	7^{7}
(Poland) A Olsza (Slovenia) T Pisnik	6	1	3
2	(Argentina) L Montalvo (Argentina) P Suárez	2	6	6

Quarterfinals
1	(Spain) C Martínez (Argentina) P Tarabini	6	6
(Croatia) J Kostanić (Federal Republic of Yugoslavia) S Naćuk	3	1
3	(Romania) C Cristea (Romania) R Dragomir	1	4
Q	(Spain) G León García (Spain) M Sánchez Lorenzo	6	6
(Austria) B Schwartz (United States) M Shaughnessy	2	6	4
4	(France) A Dechaume-Balleret (France) É Loit	6	3	6
(Australia) A Molik (Russia) N Petrova	1	4
2	(Argentina) L Montalvo (Argentina) P Suárez	6	6

Semifinals
1	(Spain) C Martínez (Argentina) P Tarabini	5	7^{7}	2^{r}
Q	(Spain) G León García (Spain) M Sánchez Lorenzo	7	6^{4}	2
4	(France) A Dechaume-Balleret (France) É Loit	3	2
2	(Argentina) L Montalvo (Argentina) P Suárez	6	6

Final
Q	(Spain) G León García (Spain) M Sánchez Lorenzo	4	3
2	(Argentina) L Montalvo (Argentina) P Suárez	6	6

== Qualifying ==
=== Seeds ===
1. (Czech Republic) Milena Nekvapilová / (Czech Republic) Hana Šromová (qualifying competition)
2. (Czech Republic) Olga Blahotová / (Czech Republic) Sandra Kleinová (semifinals)

=== Qualifiers ===
1. (Spain) Gala León García / (Spain) María Sánchez Lorenzo

== Qualifying draw ==
Key

- Q = Qualifier
- WC = Wild card
- LL = Lucky loser
- Alt = Alternate
- ITF = ITF entry
- PR = Protected ranking
- SR = Special ranking
- SE = Special exempt
- JE = Junior exempt
- JR = Junior Accelerator Programme entrant
- CO = College Accelerator Programme entrant
- NG = Next Gen Accelerator Program entrant
- w/o = Walkover
- r = Retired
- d = Defaulted

First round
1	(Czech Republic) Milena Nekvapilová (Czech Republic) Hana Šromová	8
(Poland) Monika Gieczys (Russia) Tatiana Panova	4
(Poland) Agata Kurowska (Poland) Paulina Janus	4
(Poland) Anną Dolińską (Poland) Magdalena Marszałek	8
(Spain) Gala León García (Spain) María Sánchez Lorenzo	8
(Poland) Agnieszka Abram (Poland) Agata Cioroch	3
(Belarus) Nadejda Ostrovskaya (Israel) Anna Smashnova	4
2	(Czech Republic) Olga Blahotová (Czech Republic) Sandra Kleinová	8

Second round
1	(Czech Republic) Milena Nekvapilová (Czech Republic) Hana Šromová	8
(Poland) Anną Dolińską (Poland) Magdalena Marszałek	1
(Spain) Gala León García (Spain) María Sánchez Lorenzo	8
2	(Czech Republic) Olga Blahotová (Czech Republic) Sandra Kleinová	3

Qualifying competition
1	(Czech Republic) Milena Nekvapilová (Czech Republic) Hana Šromová	6
(Spain) Gala León García (Spain) María Sánchez Lorenzo	8
