= 1999 Toray Pan Pacific Open – Doubles =

Doubles
- 1999 Toray Pan Pacific Open

Final
- Champions: (United States) Lindsay Davenport (Belarus) Natasha Zvereva
- Runners-up: (Switzerland) Martina Hingis (Czech Republic) Jana Novotná
- Score: 6–2, 6–3

Events
Singles	Doubles
- Toray Pan Pacific Open

The 1999 Toray Pan Pacific Open doubles was the doubles event of the twenty-fourth edition of the Toray Pan Pacific Open Tennis Tournament, the first WTA Tier I tournament of the year. Martina Hingis and Mirjana Lučić were the defending champions but only Hingis competed that year with Jana Novotná.

Hingis and Novotná lost in the final 6–2, 6–3 against Lindsay Davenport and Natasha Zvereva.

== Seeds ==
1. (Switzerland) Martina Hingis / (Czech Republic) Jana Novotná (final)
2. (United States) Lindsay Davenport / (Belarus) Natasha Zvereva (champions)
3. (United States) Lisa Raymond / (Australia) Rennae Stubbs (quarterfinals)
4. (Russia) Elena Likhovtseva / (Japan) Ai Sugiyama (quarterfinals)

== Draw ==
Key

- Q = Qualifier
- WC = Wild card
- LL = Lucky loser
- Alt = Alternate
- ITF = ITF entry
- PR = Protected ranking
- SR = Special ranking
- SE = Special exempt
- JE = Junior exempt
- JR = Junior Accelerator Programme entrant
- CO = College Accelerator Programme entrant
- NG = Next Gen Accelerator Program entrant
- w/o = Walkover
- r = Retired
- d = Defaulted

First round
1	(Switzerland) M Hingis (Czech Republic) J Novotná	6	6
(Australia) C Barclay (Australia) K-A Guse	3	3
Q	(South Korea) S-h Park (Chinese Taipei) S-t Wang	1	0
WC	(Japan) M Saeki (Japan) Y Yoshida	6	6
3	(United States) L Raymond (Australia) R Stubbs	6	6
(Slovenia) T Križan (Japan) N Miyagi	3	1
(Belgium) E Callens (France) J Halard-Decugis	2	2
(South Africa) M de Swardt (Ukraine) E Tatarkova	6	6
(Argentina) P Tarabini (Netherlands) C Vis	6	7
(Croatia) I Majoli (Australia) N Pratt	1	5
(Australia) K Kunce (United States) K Po	3	3
4	(Russia) E Likhovtseva (Japan) A Sugiyama	6	6
(Russia) A Kournikova (United States) M Seles	7^{7}	6
(United States) K Adams (United States) D Graham	6^{2}	2
(Germany) A Huber (Latvia) L Neiland	2	2
2	(United States) L Davenport (Belarus) N Zvereva	6	6

Quarterfinals
1	(Switzerland) M Hingis (Czech Republic) J Novotná	6	5	6
WC	(Japan) M Saeki (Japan) Y Yoshida	3	7	4
3	(United States) L Raymond (Australia) R Stubbs	1	4
(South Africa) M de Swardt (Ukraine) E Tatarkova	6	6
(Argentina) P Tarabini (Netherlands) C Vis	3	6	6
4	(Russia) E Likhovtseva (Japan) A Sugiyama	6	3	3
(Russia) A Kournikova (United States) M Seles	4	4
2	(United States) L Davenport (Belarus) N Zvereva	6	6

Semifinals
1	(Switzerland) M Hingis (Czech Republic) J Novotná	6	6
(South Africa) M de Swardt (Ukraine) E Tatarkova	3	3
(Argentina) P Tarabini (Netherlands) C Vis	1	0
2	(United States) L Davenport (Belarus) N Zvereva	6	6

Final
1	(Switzerland) M Hingis (Czech Republic) J Novotná	2	3
2	(United States) L Davenport (Belarus) N Zvereva	6	6

== Qualifying ==
=== Seeds ===
1. (South Africa) Liezel Horn / (Austria) Karin Kschwendt (qualifying competition)
2. (Japan) Rika Hiraki / (Australia) Lisa McShea (first round)

=== Qualifiers ===
1. (South Korea) Park Sung-hee / (Chinese Taipei) Wang Shi-ting

== Qualifying draw ==
Key

- Q = Qualifier
- WC = Wild card
- LL = Lucky loser
- Alt = Alternate
- ITF = ITF entry
- PR = Protected ranking
- SR = Special ranking
- SE = Special exempt
- JE = Junior exempt
- JR = Junior Accelerator Programme entrant
- CO = College Accelerator Programme entrant
- NG = Next Gen Accelerator Program entrant
- w/o = Walkover
- r = Retired
- d = Defaulted

First round
1	(South Africa) Liezel Horn (Austria) Karin Kschwendt	9
(Japan) Keiko Ishida (Japan) Keiko Nagatomi	7
(South Korea) Cho Yoon-jeong (Japan) Shiho Hisamatsu	4
(Australia) Annabel Ellwood (United States) Samantha Reeves	8
(South Korea) Park Sung-hee (Chinese Taipei) Wang Shi-ting	8
(Japan) Hiroko Mochizuki (Japan) Ryoko Takemura	3
(Japan) Shinobu Asagoe (Austria) Sylvia Plischke	8
2	(Japan) Rika Hiraki (Australia) Lisa McShea	4

Second round
1	(South Africa) Liezel Horn (Austria) Karin Kschwendt	8
(Australia) Annabel Ellwood (United States) Samantha Reeves	5
(South Korea) Park Sung-hee (Chinese Taipei) Wang Shi-ting	8
(Japan) Shinobu Asagoe (Austria) Sylvia Plischke	2

Qualifying competition
1	(South Africa) Liezel Horn (Austria) Karin Kschwendt	8
(South Korea) Park Sung-hee (Chinese Taipei) Wang Shi-ting	9
