= 1999 Toray Pan Pacific Open – Singles =

Singles
- 1999 Toray Pan Pacific Open

Final
- Champion: (Switzerland) Martina Hingis
- Runner-up: (South Africa) Amanda Coetzer
- Score: 6–2, 6–1

Details
- Draw: 28 (4 Q / 3 WC )
- Seeds: 8

Events
Singles	Doubles
- Pan Pacific Open

Martina Hingis defeated Amanda Coetzer in the final, 6–2, 6–1 to win the singles tennis title at the 1999 Pan Pacific Open.

Lindsay Davenport was the defending champion, but lost in the quarterfinals to Coetzer.

== Seeds ==
The top four seeds received a bye to the second round.

1. (United States) Lindsay Davenport (quarterfinals)
2. (Switzerland) Martina Hingis (champion)
3. (Czech Republic) Jana Novotná (semifinals)
4. (United States) Monica Seles (semifinals)
5. (Germany) Steffi Graf (quarterfinals)
6. (Russia) Anna Kournikova (quarterfinals)
7. (South Africa) Amanda Coetzer (final)
8. (Belarus) Natasha Zvereva (quarterfinals)

== Draw ==
Key

- Q = Qualifier
- WC = Wild card
- LL = Lucky loser
- Alt = Alternate
- ITF = ITF entry
- PR = Protected ranking
- SR = Special ranking
- SE = Special exempt
- JE = Junior exempt
- JR = Junior Accelerator Programme entrant
- CO = College Accelerator Programme entrant
- NG = Next Gen Accelerator Program entrant
- w/o = Walkover
- r = Retired
- d = Defaulted

=== Final ===
Semifinals
7	(South Africa) Amanda Coetzer	6	6
4	(United States) Monica Seles	4	2
3	(Czech Republic) Jana Novotná	3	4
2	(Switzerland) Martina Hingis	6	6

Final
7	(South Africa) Amanda Coetzer	2	1
2	(Switzerland) Martina Hingis	6	6

=== Top half ===
First round
(Croatia) I Majoli	1	2
(United States) M J Fernández	6	6
(United States) K Po	3	1
Q	(Belgium) E Callens	6	6
(Spain) M Serna	2	1
7	(South Africa) A Coetzer	6	6
(France) S Pitkowski	3	6	6
Q	(Latvia) L Neiland	6	2	1
(France) J Halard-Decugis	2	1
WC	(Zimbabwe) C Black	6	6
(Germany) A Huber	6^{4}	0
6	(Russia) A Kournikova	7^{7}	6

Second round
1	(United States) L Davenport	6	6
(United States) M J Fernández	4	4
Q	(Belgium) E Callens	6	1	5
7	(South Africa) A Coetzer	2	6	7
4	(United States) M Seles	6	6
(France) S Pitkowski	1	3
WC	(Zimbabwe) C Black	2	3
6	(Russia) A Kournikova	6	6

Quarterfinals
1	(United States) L Davenport	6	4	3
7	(South Africa) A Coetzer	2	6	6
4	(United States) M Seles	7	6
6	(Russia) A Kournikova	5	3

Semifinals
7	(South Africa) A Coetzer	6	6
4	(United States) M Seles	4	2

=== Bottom half ===
First round
8	(Belarus) N Zvereva	6^{2}	6	6
(United States) T Snyder	7^{7}	2	4
(Austria) S Plischke	1	2
(United States) L Raymond	6	6
(South Africa) M de Swardt	6	6
WC	(Japan) M Saeki	3	4
5	(Germany) S Graf	6	6
Q	(United States) S Reeves	0	1
Q	(Ukraine) E Tatarkova	6	4	2
(Russia) E Likhovtseva	4	6	6
WC	(Chinese Taipei) S-t Wang	2	3
(Japan) A Sugiyama	6	6

Second round
8	(Belarus) N Zvereva	6	6
(United States) L Raymond	3	2
(South Africa) M de Swardt	2	2
3	(Czech Republic) J Novotná	6	6
5	(Germany) S Graf	4	7^{7}	6
(Russia) E Likhovtseva	6	6^{4}	2
(Japan) A Sugiyama	6	1	2
2	(Switzerland) M Hingis	3	6	6

Quarterfinals
8	(Belarus) N Zvereva	5	r
3	(Czech Republic) J Novotná	7
5	(Germany) S Graf	6	2	4
2	(Switzerland) M Hingis	3	6	6

Semifinals
3	(Czech Republic) J Novotná	3	4
2	(Switzerland) M Hingis	6	6

== Qualifying ==
=== Seeds ===
1. (Ukraine) Elena Tatarkova (Qualifier)
2. (Italy) Rita Grande (qualifying competition)
3. (Venezuela) María Vento (second round)
4. (United States) Meghann Shaughnessy (second round)
5. (Latvia) Larisa Neiland (Qualifier)
6. (Sweden) Åsa Carlsson (first round)
7. (Belgium) Els Callens (Qualifier)
8. (United States) Samantha Reeves (Qualifier)

=== Qualifiers ===
1. (Ukraine) Elena Tatarkova
2. (United States) Samantha Reeves
3. (Belgium) Els Callens
4. (Latvia) Larisa Neiland

== Qualifying draw ==
Key

- Q = Qualifier
- WC = Wild card
- LL = Lucky loser
- Alt = Alternate
- ITF = ITF entry
- PR = Protected ranking
- SR = Special ranking
- SE = Special exempt
- JE = Junior exempt
- JR = Junior Accelerator Programme entrant
- CO = College Accelerator Programme entrant
- NG = Next Gen Accelerator Program entrant
- w/o = Walkover
- r = Retired
- d = Defaulted

=== First qualifier ===
First round
1	(Ukraine) Elena Tatarkova	6	7
(Austria) Karin Kschwendt	4	5
(South Africa) Liezel Horn	4	2
(Australia) Nicole Pratt	6	6
(Slovenia) Tina Križan	2	6	6
(Japan) Yuka Yoshida	6	1	2
(Australia) Annabel Ellwood	2	6	7
6	(Sweden) Åsa Carlsson	6	1	5

Second round
1	(Ukraine) Elena Tatarkova	6	6
(Australia) Nicole Pratt	4	2
(Slovenia) Tina Križan	2	2
(Australia) Annabel Ellwood	6	6

Qualifying competition
1	(Ukraine) Elena Tatarkova	7^{8}	3	6
(Australia) Annabel Ellwood	6^{6}	6	1

=== Second qualifier ===
First round
4	(United States) Meghann Shaughnessy	6	7
(Australia) Lisa McShea	3	5
(Australia) Kerry-Anne Guse	0	7	6
(Japan) Haruka Inoue	6	5	4
(South Korea) Cho Yoon-jeong	6	1	6
(United States) Mashona Washington	3	6	1
WC	(Japan) Akiko Morigami	2	2
8	(United States) Samantha Reeves	6	6

Second round
4	(United States) Meghann Shaughnessy	4	6	1
(Australia) Kerry-Anne Guse	6	4	6
(South Korea) Cho Yoon-jeong	7^{7}	5	2
8	(United States) Samantha Reeves	6^{3}	7	6

Qualifying competition
(Australia) Kerry-Anne Guse	5	3
8	(United States) Samantha Reeves	7	6

=== Third qualifier ===
First round
7	(Belgium) Els Callens	6	5	6
(Japan) Saori Obata	1	7	1
(Spain) Alicia Ortuño	6	6
WC	(Japan) Seiko Okamoto	3	3
(Netherlands) Seda Noorlander	6	6
(South Korea) Park Sung-hee	2	2
(Japan) Shinobu Asagoe	4	4
3	(Venezuela) María Vento	6	6

Second round
7	(Belgium) Els Callens	6	6
(Spain) Alicia Ortuño	2	3
(Netherlands) Seda Noorlander	6	6
3	(Venezuela) María Vento	2	1

Qualifying competition
7	(Belgium) Els Callens	6	7^{7}
(Netherlands) Seda Noorlander	3	6^{5}

=== Fourth qualifier ===
First round
5	(Latvia) Larisa Neiland	6	6
WC	(Japan) Maiko Inoue	4	2
(Japan) Rika Hiraki	0	4
(United States) Meilen Tu	6	6
WC	(Japan) Rika Fujiwara	6	6
(Australia) Catherine Barclay	2	3
(South Korea) Kim Eun-ha	0	3
2	(Italy) Rita Grande	6	6

Second round
5	(Latvia) Larisa Neiland	7^{7}	2	6
(United States) Meilen Tu	6^{5}	6	4
WC	(Japan) Rika Fujiwara	3	0
2	(Italy) Rita Grande	6	6

Qualifying competition
5	(Latvia) Larisa Neiland	7^{7}	6
2	(Italy) Rita Grande	6^{1}	2
