= 1999 WTA Tour Championships – Doubles =

Doubles
- 1999 WTA Tour Championships

Final
- Champions: (Switzerland) Martina Hingis (Russia) Anna Kournikova
- Runners-up: (Latvia) Larisa Neiland (Spain) Arantxa Sánchez Vicario
- Score: 6–4, 6–4

Details
- Draw: 8
- Seeds: 4

Events
Singles	Doubles
← 1998 ·	WTA Tour Championships	· 2000 →

Martina Hingis and Anna Kournikova defeated Larisa Neiland and Arantxa Sánchez Vicario in the final, 6–4, 6–4 to win the doubles tennis title at the 1999 WTA Tour Championships.

Lindsay Davenport and Natasha Zvereva were the reigning champions, but only Davenport qualified this year partnering Corina Morariu. They were defeated in the semifinals by Neiland and Sánchez Vicario.

== Seeds ==
1. (Switzerland) Martina Hingis / (Russia) Anna Kournikova (champions)
2. (United States) Lindsay Davenport / (United States) Corina Morariu (semifinals)
3. (United States) Lisa Raymond / (Australia) Rennae Stubbs (semifinals)
4. (Latvia) Larisa Neiland / (Spain) Arantxa Sánchez Vicario (final)

== Draw ==
=== Key ===
- Q = Qualifier
- WC = Wild card
- LL = Lucky loser
- Alt = Alternate
- SE = Special exempt
- PR = Protected ranking
- ITF = ITF entry
- JE = Junior exempt
- w/o = Walkover
- r = Retired
- d = Defaulted
- SR = Special ranking

=== Finals ===
Quarterfinals
1	(Switzerland) Martina Hingis (Russia) Anna Kournikova	1	6	7
(France) Alexandra Fusai (France) Nathalie Tauziat	6	1	5
3	(United States) Lisa Raymond (Australia) Rennae Stubbs	6	6
(Russia) Elena Likhovtseva (Japan) Ai Sugiyama	3	3
(Romania) Irina Spîrlea (Netherlands) Caroline Vis	3	6	3
4	(Latvia) Larisa Neiland (Spain) Arantxa Sánchez Vicario	6	3	6
Alt	(Spain) Conchita Martínez (Argentina) Patricia Tarabini	0	5
2	(United States) Lindsay Davenport (United States) Corina Morariu	6	7

Semifinals
1	(Switzerland) Martina Hingis (Russia) Anna Kournikova	4	7^{7}	6
3	(United States) Lisa Raymond (Australia) Rennae Stubbs	6	6^{3}	0
4	(Latvia) Larisa Neiland (Spain) Arantxa Sánchez Vicario	7^{7}	7
2	(United States) Lindsay Davenport (United States) Corina Morariu	6^{4}	5

Final
1	(Switzerland) Martina Hingis (Russia) Anna Kournikova	6	6
4	(Latvia) Larisa Neiland (Spain) Arantxa Sánchez Vicario	4	4
