= 1999 Prokom Polish Open – Singles =

Singles
- 1999 Prokom Polish Open

Final
- Champion: (Spain) Conchita Martínez
- Runner-up: (Slovakia) Karina Habšudová
- Score: 6–1, 6–1

Details
- Draw: 30
- Seeds: 8

Events
Singles	Doubles
- Prokom Polish Open

The 1999 Orange Prokom Open singles was the singles event of the second edition of the most prestigious women's tennis tournament held in Poland. Henrieta Nagyová was the defending champion, and the sixth seed this year, but she retired 2–6, 1–4 down against Silvija Talaja.

Conchita Martínez won in the final, 6–1, 6–1, against Karina Habšudová, to win her 31st WTA title.

== Seeds ==
1. (Spain) Arantxa Sánchez Vicario (second round)
2. (France) Sandrine Testud (semifinals)
3. (Spain) Conchita Martínez (champion)
4. (Belarus) Natasha Zvereva (second round)
5. (Italy) Silvia Farina (second round)
6. (Slovakia) Henrieta Nagyová (second round, retired)
7. (Israel) Anna Smashnova (first round)
8. (Spain) Gala León García (quarterfinals)

== Draw ==
Key

- Q = Qualifier
- WC = Wild card
- LL = Lucky loser
- Alt = Alternate
- ITF = ITF entry
- PR = Protected ranking
- SR = Special ranking
- SE = Special exempt
- JE = Junior exempt
- JR = Junior Accelerator Programme entrant
- CO = College Accelerator Programme entrant
- NG = Next Gen Accelerator Program entrant
- w/o = Walkover
- r = Retired
- d = Defaulted

=== Finals ===
Semifinals
(Croatia) Silvija Talaja	3	1
(Slovakia) Karina Habšudová	6	6
3	(Spain) Conchita Martínez	6	6
2	(France) Sandrine Testud	3	3

Final
(Slovakia) Karina Habšudová	1	1
3	(Spain) Conchita Martínez	6	6

=== Top half ===
First round
(Germany) M Weingärtner	4	6	7
WC	(Poland) A Olsza	6	4	5
(Spain) M Sánchez Lorenzo	3	6	1
(Croatia) S Talaja	6	2	6
(Argentina) P Suárez	2	2
6	(Slovakia) H Nagyová	6	6
4	(Belarus) N Zvereva	6	6
(Czech Republic) D Chládková	4	3
Q	(Spain) E Bes	4	3
(Spain) C Torrens Valero	6	6
(Belgium) S Appelmans	6	6
(France) É Loit	1	4
(Slovakia) K Habšudová	7	6
7	(Israel) A Smashnova	5	2

Second round
1	(Spain) A Sánchez Vicario	4	4
(Germany) M Weingärtner	6	6
(Croatia) S Talaja	6	4
6	(Slovakia) H Nagyová	2	1	r
4	(Belarus) N Zvereva	3	4
(Spain) C Torrens Valero	6	6
(Belgium) S Appelmans	3	4
(Slovakia) K Habšudová	6	6

Quarterfinals
(Germany) M Weingärtner	4	2
(Croatia) S Talaja	6	6
(Spain) C Torrens Valero	6	6^{5}	2
(Slovakia) K Habšudová	4	7^{7}	6

Semifinals
(Croatia) S Talaja	3	1
(Slovakia) K Habšudová	6	6

=== Bottom half ===
First round
8	(Spain) G León García	6	6
WC	(Poland) A Żarska	1	4
(Germany) B Rittner	6	6
(Belarus) O Barabanschikova	1	0
WC	(Poland) M Grzybowska	2	6	6
(United States) M Shaughnessy	6	4	1
(Austria) B Schwartz	2	7^{7}	4
3	(Spain) C Martínez	6	6^{1}	6
5	(Italy) S Farina	6	6
(France) A Dechaume-Balleret	0	3
Q	(Slovakia) Ľ Cervanová	7	6
(France) A Cocheteux	5	0
Q	(Federal Republic of Yugoslavia) S Naćuk	6	6
Q	(Croatia) J Kostanić	3	4

Second round
8	(Spain) G León García	6	1	7
(Germany) B Rittner	0	6	5
WC	(Poland) M Grzybowska	1	1
3	(Spain) C Martínez	6	6
5	(Italy) S Farina	6	4	4
Q	(Slovakia) Ľ Cervanová	4	6	6
(Federal Republic of Yugoslavia) S Naćuk	2	6	2
2	(France) S Testud	6	2	6

Quarterfinals
8	(Spain) G León García	5	4
3	(Spain) C Martínez	7	6
Q	(Slovakia) Ľ Cervanová	6	3	5
2	(France) S Testud	4	6	7

Semifinals
3	(Spain) C Martínez	6	6
2	(France) S Testud	3	3

== Qualifying ==
=== Seeds ===
1. (Australia) Alicia Molik (first round)
2. (Federal Republic of Yugoslavia) Sandra Naćuk (Qualifier)
3. (Czech Republic) Sandra Kleinová (second round)
4. (Romania) Cătălina Cristea (qualifying competition)
5. (Slovakia) Ľudmila Cervanová (Qualifier)
6. (Romania) Raluca Sandu (first round)
7. (Slovakia) Katarína Studeníková (second round)
8. (Czech Republic) Lenka Němečková (second round, retired)

=== Qualifiers ===
1. (Spain) Eva Bes
2. (Croatia) Jelena Kostanić
3. (Slovakia) Ľudmila Cervanová
4. (Federal Republic of Yugoslavia) Sandra Naćuk

== Qualifying draw ==
Key

- Q = Qualifier
- WC = Wild card
- LL = Lucky loser
- Alt = Alternate
- ITF = ITF entry
- PR = Protected ranking
- SR = Special ranking
- SE = Special exempt
- JE = Junior exempt
- JR = Junior Accelerator Programme entrant
- CO = College Accelerator Programme entrant
- NG = Next Gen Accelerator Program entrant
- w/o = Walkover
- r = Retired
- d = Defaulted

=== First qualifier ===
First round
1	(Australia) Alicia Molik	6	6^{4}	1
(Czech Republic) Petra Kučová	2	7^{7}	6
(Czech Republic) Olga Blahotová	6	6
WC	(Poland) Agnieszka Abram	2	1
(Russia) Lina Krasnoroutskaya	1	5
(Spain) Eva Bes	6	7
(Czech Republic) Zuzana Hejdová	1	1
7	(Slovakia) Katarína Studeníková	6	6

Second round
(Czech Republic) Petra Kučová	6	6
(Czech Republic) Olga Blahotová	1	2
(Spain) Eva Bes	6	3	6
7	(Slovakia) Katarína Studeníková	4	6	3

Qualifying competition
(Czech Republic) Petra Kučová	1	2
(Spain) Eva Bes	6	6

=== Second qualifier ===
First round
3	(Czech Republic) Sandra Kleinová	1	7	6
(Belarus) Nadejda Ostrovskaya	6	5	3
WC	(Poland) Sylwia Rynarzewska	6	3	1
(Czech Republic) Hana Šromová	4	6	6
(Russia) Daria Panova	4	4
(Czech Republic) Renata Kučerová	6	6
(Croatia) Jelena Kostanić	7^{10}	6
6	(Romania) Raluca Sandu	6^{8}	4

Second round
3	(Czech Republic) Sandra Kleinová	2	3
(Czech Republic) Hana Šromová	6	6
(Czech Republic) Renata Kučerová	3	6	1
(Croatia) Jelena Kostanić	6	2	6

Qualifying competition
(Czech Republic) Hana Šromová	3	0
(Croatia) Jelena Kostanić	6	6

=== Third qualifier ===
First round
5	(Slovakia) Ľudmila Cervanová	6	6
(Czech Republic) Eva Martincová	2	2
(Czech Republic) Blanka Kumbárová	2	3
(Czech Republic) Milena Nekvapilová	6	6
(France) Stéphanie Foretz	7^{8}	6
(Austria) Marion Maruska	6^{6}	4
(Russia) Nadia Petrova	6	4	4
4	(Romania) Cătălina Cristea	2	6	6

Second round
5	(Slovakia) Ľudmila Cervanová	6	6
(Czech Republic) Milena Nekvapilová	3	1
(France) Stéphanie Foretz	6	1	4
4	(Romania) Cătălina Cristea	4	6	6

Qualifying competition
5	(Slovakia) Ľudmila Cervanová	6	6
4	(Romania) Cătălina Cristea	3	2

=== Fourth qualifier ===
First round
8	(Czech Republic) Lenka Němečková	6	6
(Germany) Veronika Martinek	0	3
(Spain) Mariam Ramón Climent	1	3
(Germany) Anca Barna	6	6
(Uzbekistan) Iroda Tulyaganova	7^{8}	1	3
(Slovenia) Tina Pisnik	6^{6}	6	6
(Slovakia) Martina Suchá	4	6	1
2	(Federal Republic of Yugoslavia) Sandra Naćuk	6	1	6

Second round
8	(Czech Republic) Lenka Němečková	6	5	0^{r}
(Germany) Anca Barna	3	7	3
(Slovenia) Tina Pisnik	6	2	6^{6}
2	(Federal Republic of Yugoslavia) Sandra Naćuk	2	6	7^{8}

Qualifying competition
(Germany) Anca Barna	1	2
2	(Federal Republic of Yugoslavia) Sandra Naćuk	6	6
