= 1999 TIG Classic =

- Date: August 2–8
- Edition: 21st
- Category: Tier II
- Draw: 28S / 16D
- Prize money: $520,000
- Surface: Hard / outdoor
- Location: San Diego, CA, United States

Champions

Singles
- (Switzerland) Martina Hingis

Doubles
- (United States) Lindsay Davenport / (United States) Corina Morariu
- Southern California Open

The 1999 TIG Classic was a women's tennis tournament played on outdoor hard courts in San Diego, California, United States. It was part of Tier II of the 1999 WTA Tour. It was the 21st edition of the tournament and was held from August 2 through August 8, 1999. Second-seeded Martina Hingis won the singles title and earned $80,000 first-prize money. This edition of the tournament is notable as the last event Steffi Graf participated in before announcing her retirement.

== Finals ==
=== Singles ===
(Switzerland) Martina Hingis defeated (United States) Venus Williams 6–4, 6–0

- It was Hingis' 5th singles title of the year and the 24th of her career.

=== Doubles ===
(United States) Lindsay Davenport / (United States) Corina Morariu defeated (United States) Serena Williams / (United States) Venus Williams 6–4, 6–1

== Entrants ==
=== Seeds ===
Country	Player	Rank	Seed
USA	Lindsay Davenport	1	1
SUI	Martina Hingis	2	2
GER	Steffi Graf	3	3
USA	Venus Williams	4	4
FRA	Mary Pierce	6	5
ESP	Arantxa Sánchez Vicario	8	6
RSA	Amanda Coetzer	9	7
FRA	Nathalie Tauziat	10	8

=== Other entrants ===
The following players received wildcards into the singles main draw:

- (United States) Lisa Raymond
- (France) Julie Halard-Decugis

The following players received wildcards into the doubles main draw:

- (Croatia) Iva Majoli / (Belgium) Dominique Van Roost

The following players received entry from the singles qualifying draw:

- (Colombia) Fabiola Zuluaga
- (Canada) Maureen Drake
- (United States) Meilen Tu
- (Germany) Anke Huber

The following players received entry from the doubles qualifying draw:

- (Chinese Taipei) Janet Lee / (Canada) Vanessa Webb
