= 1999 Toray Pan Pacific Open =

Women's tennis tournament

- Date: 2–7 February
- Edition: 27th
- Category: Tier I
- Draw: 28S / 16D
- Prize money: $1,000,000
- Surface: Carpet / indoor
- Location: Tokyo, Japan
- Venue: Tokyo Metropolitan Gymnasium

Champions

Singles
- (Switzerland) Martina Hingis

Doubles
- (United States) Lindsay Davenport / (Belarus) Natasha Zvereva
← 1998 ·	Pan Pacific Open	· 2000 →

The 1999 Toray Pan Pacific Open was a women's tennis tournament played on indoor carpet courts at the Tokyo Metropolitan Gymnasium in Tokyo, Japan that was part of Tier I of the 1999 WTA Tour. It was the 27th edition of the tournament and was held from 2 February through 7 February 1999. Second-seeded Martina Hingis won the singles title and earned $150,000 first-prize money.

== Finals ==
=== Singles ===
(Switzerland) Martina Hingis defeated (South Africa) Amanda Coetzer, 6–2, 6–1

- It was Hingis' 2nd singles title of the year and the 21st of her career.

=== Doubles ===
(United States) Lindsay Davenport / (Belarus) Natasha Zvereva defeated (Switzerland) Martina Hingis / (Czech Republic) Jana Novotná, 6–2, 6–3

== Entrants ==
=== Seeds ===
Country	Player	Rank	Seed
USA	Lindsay Davenport	1	1
SUI	Martina Hingis	2	2
CZE	Jana Novotná	3	3
USA	Monica Seles	4	4
GER	Steffi Graf	7	5
RUS	Anna Kournikova	12	6
RSA	Amanda Coetzer	15	7
BLR	Natasha Zvereva	17	8

=== Other entrants ===
The following players received wildcards into the singles main draw:

- (Zimbabwe) Cara Black
- (Japan) Miho Saeki
- (Chinese Taipei) Wang Shi-ting

The following players received wildcards into the doubles main draw:

- (Japan) Miho Saeki / (Japan) Yuka Yoshida

The following players received entry from the singles qualifying draw:

- (Belgium) Els Callens
- (Latvia) Larisa Neiland
- (United States) Samantha Reeves
- (Ukraine) Elena Tatarkova

The following players received entry from the doubles qualifying draw:

- (South Korea) Park Sung-hee / (Chinese Taipei) Wang Shi-ting
