= 1999 Pilot Pen Tennis =

- Date: August 22–28
- Edition: 17th
- Category: Tier II
- Draw: 28S / 16D
- Prize money: $520,000
- Surface: Hard / outdoor
- Location: New Haven, CT, United States

Champions

Singles
- (United States) Venus Williams

Doubles
- (United States) Lisa Raymond / (Australia) Rennae Stubbs
← 1998 ·	Pilot Pen Tennis	· 2000 →

The 1999 Pilot Pen Tennis was a women's tennis tournament played on outdoor hard courts in New Haven in the United States. It was part of Tier II of the 1999 WTA Tour. The tournament was held from August 22 through August 28, 1999. Second-seeded Venus Williams won the singles title, earning US$80,000 first prize money.

== Entrants ==
=== Seeds ===
- Ranking date 16 August 1999

Country	Player	Rank	Seed
USA	Lindsay Davenport	2	1
USA	Venus Williams	4	2
USA	Monica Seles	5	3
CZE	Jana Novotná	7	4
RSA	Amanda Coetzer	9	5
FRA	Julie Halard-Decugis	11	6
FRA	Nathalie Tauziat	12	7
FRA	Sandrine Testud	14	8

=== Other entrants ===
The following players received wildcards into the singles main draw:

- (United States) Tara Snyder
- (United States) Lilia Osterloh

The following players received wildcards into the doubles main draw:

- (United States) Tara Snyder / (United States) Alexandra Stevenson

The following players received entry from the singles qualifying draw:

- (Russia) Tatiana Panova
- (Czech Republic) Květa Hrdličková
- (Spain) Ángeles Montolio
- (Austria) Barbara Schwartz
- (France) Amélie Cocheteux
- (Belgium) Sabine Appelmans
- (Spain) Magüi Serna
- (Spain) María Sánchez Lorenzo

== Finals ==
=== Singles ===
(United States) Venus Williams defeated (United States) Lindsay Davenport, 6–2, 7–5

- This was Williams' fifth title of the year.

=== Doubles ===
(United States) Lisa Raymond / (Australia) Rennae Stubbs defeated (Russia) Elena Likhovtseva / (Czech Republic) Jana Novotná, 7–6^{(7–1)}, 6–2
