= 1999 Advanta Championships of Philadelphia =

Women's tennis tournament

- Date: November 8–14
- Edition: 17th
- Category: Tier II
- Draw: 28S /16D
- Prize money: $520,000
- Surface: Hard / indoor
- Location: Philadelphia, United States

Champions

Singles
- (United States) Lindsay Davenport

Doubles
- (United States) Lisa Raymond / (Australia) Rennae Stubbs
- Championships of Philadelphia

The 1999 Advanta Championships of Philadelphia was a women's tennis tournament played on indoor hard courts in Philadelphia, United States. It was part of Tier II of the 1999 WTA Tour. It was the 17th edition of the tournament and was held from November 8 through November 14, 1999. Second-seeded Lindsay Davenport won the singles title and earned $80,000 first-prize money.

== Finals ==
=== Singles ===
(United States) Lindsay Davenport defeated (Switzerland) Martina Hingis, 6–3, 6–4

- This was Davenport's twenty-fifth WTA title of her career, and sixth of the year.

=== Doubles ===
(United States) Lisa Raymond / (Australia) Rennae Stubbs defeated (United States) Chanda Rubin / (France) Sandrine Testud, 6–1, 7–6^{(7–2)}

== Entrants ==
=== Seeds ===
Country	Player	Rank	Seed
SUI	Martina Hingis	1	1
USA	Lindsay Davenport	2	2
USA	Venus Williams	3	3
FRA	Nathalie Tauziat	7	4
FRA	Julie Halard-Decugis	9	5
RSA	Amanda Coetzer	10	6
BEL	Dominique Van Roost	13	7
RUS	Anna Kournikova	12	8

=== Other entrants ===
The following players received wildcards into the singles main draw:

- (Belgium) Justine Henin
- (Belgium) Kim Clijsters
- (Zimbabwe) Cara Black

The following players received wildcards into the doubles main draw:

- (Belgium) Kim Clijsters / (Belgium) Justine Henin

The following players received entry from the singles qualifying draw:

- (United States) Jill Craybas
- (United States) Marissa Irvin
- (Venezuela) María Vento
- (Czech Republic) Dája Bedáňová

The following players received entry as lucky losers:

- (Netherlands) Seda Noorlander

The following players received entry from the doubles qualifying draw:

- (United States) Sandra Cacic / (United States) Lilia Osterloh
