= 1999 WTA German Open =

- Date: 10 – 16 May
- Edition: 88th
- Category: Tier I
- Draw: 56S / 28D
- Prize money: $1,050,000
- Surface: Clay / outdoor
- Location: Berlin, Germany
- Venue: Rot-Weiss Tennis Club

Champions

Singles
- (Switzerland) Martina Hingis

Doubles
- (France) Alexandra Fusai / (France) Nathalie Tauziat
- WTA German Open

The 1999 German Open was a women's tennis event that was played in Berlin, Germany from 10 May to 16 May 1999. It was the 88th edition of the tournament and one of two Tier I events that took place on outdoor red clay courts in the build-up to the second Grand Slam of the year, the French Open. First-seeded Martina Hingis won the singles title and earned $150,000 first-prize money.

== Finals ==
=== Singles ===
(Switzerland) Martina Hingis defeated (France) Julie Halard-Decugis, 6–0, 6–1

- It was Hingis' 4th title of the year and the 23rd of her career.

=== Doubles ===
(France) Alexandra Fusai / (France) Nathalie Tauziat defeated (Czech Republic) Jana Novotná / (Argentina) Patricia Tarabini, 6–3, 7–5

== Entrants ==
=== Seeds ===
- Ranking date 3 May 1999

Country	Player	Rank	Seed
SUI	Martina Hingis	1	1
CZE	Jana Novotná	4	2
GER	Steffi Graf	6	3
ESP	Arantxa Sánchez Vicario	7	4
FRA	Nathalie Tauziat	9	6
USA	Serena Williams	10	7
SUI	Patty Schnyder	12	8
RUS	Anna Kournikova	13	9
RSA	Amanda Coetzer	14	10
BEL	Dominique Van Roost	15	11
FRA	Amélie Mauresmo	16	12
ROU	Irina Spîrlea	17	13
ESP	Conchita Martínez	18	14
BLR	Natasha Zvereva	19	15
AUT	Barbara Schett	20	16

=== Other entrants ===
The following players received wildcards into the singles main draw:

- (Germany) Jana Kandarr
- (United States) Jennifer Capriati
- (Germany) Julia Abe

The following players received wildcards into the doubles main draw:

- (Germany) Anca Barna / (Germany) Marlene Weingärtner
- (Germany) Julia Abe / (Germany) Jana Kandarr

The following players received entry from the singles qualifying draw:

- (Italy) Germana Di Natale
- (Germany) Miriam Schnitzer
- (Germany) Sandra Klösel
- (Czech Republic) Sandra Kleinová
- (United States) Sandra Cacic
- (Germany) Anca Barna
- (Federal Republic of Yugoslavia) Sandra Načuk
- (Switzerland) Emmanuelle Gagliardi

The following players received entry as lucky losers:

- (Argentina) Mariana Díaz Oliva
- (Netherlands) Amanda Hopmans
- (Bulgaria) Pavlina Stoyanova
- (Argentina) Florencia Labat

The following players received entry from the doubles qualifying draw:

- (Italy) Germana Di Natale / (Italy) Flora Perfetti

The following players received entry as lucky losers:

- (United States) Brie Rippner / (United States) Tara Snyder
