= Orange Warsaw Open =

Defunct tennis tournament
- Location: Warsaw; Poland
- Venue: Warszawianka Courts
- Surface: Clay / outdoor
- Website: www.orangewarsawopen.pl
ATP Tour
- Category: ATP International Series (2001–2008)
- Draw: 32S/32Q/16D
- Prize money: €450,000
WTA Tour
- Category: WTA Tier IV (1998); WTA Tier III (1999–2004)
- Draw: 32S/32Q/16D

The Orange Warsaw Open (former Orange Prokom Open) was an annual men's tennis tournament played in Poland as part of the ATP Tour. The tournament was played on clay courts. The men's tournament began in 2001, when the San Marino Open moved to Sopot. Until 2007, the tournament was held in Sopot, before moving to Warsaw for 2008.

There was also a women's tournament on the same site. It was first organized in 1992 as a lower level competition. In 1998, the tournament became a Tier IV tournament on the WTA Tour. The next year, it moved up to Tier III. The women's tournament folded in 2004.

== Past finals ==
=== Men's singles ===
| Location | Year | Champion | Runner-up | Score |
|---|---|---|---|---|
| Sopot | 2001 | (Spain) Tommy Robredo | (Spain) Albert Portas | 1–6, 7–5, 7–6^{(7–2)} |
| Sopot | 2002 | (Argentina) José Acasuso | (Argentina) Franco Squillari | 2–6, 6–1, 6–3 |
| Sopot | 2003 | (Argentina) Guillermo Coria | (Spain) David Ferrer | 7–5, 6–1 |
| Sopot | 2004 | (Spain) Rafael Nadal | (Argentina) José Acasuso | 6–3, 6–4 |
| Sopot | 2005 | (France) Gaël Monfils | (Germany) Florian Mayer | 7–6^{(8–6)}, 4–6, 7–5 |
| Sopot | 2006 | (Russia) Nikolay Davydenko | (Germany) Florian Mayer | 7–6^{(7–5)}, 5–7, 6–4 |
| Sopot | 2007 | (Spain) Tommy Robredo | (Argentina) José Acasuso | 7–5, 6–0 |
| Warsaw | 2008 | (Russia) Nikolay Davydenko | (Spain) Tommy Robredo | 6–3, 6–3 |

=== Women's singles ===
| Location | Year | Champion | Runner-up | Score |
|---|---|---|---|---|
| Sopot | 1998 | (Slovakia) Henrieta Nagyová | (Germany) Elena Wagner | 6–3, 5–7, 6–1 |
| Sopot | 1999 | (Spain) Conchita Martínez | (Slovakia) Karina Habšudová | 6–1, 6–1 |
| Sopot | 2000 | (Germany) Anke Huber | (Spain) Gala León García | 7–6, 6–3 |
| Sopot | 2001 | (Spain) Cristina Torrens | (Spain) Gala León García | 6–2, 6–2 |
| Sopot | 2002 | (Russia) Dinara Safina | (Slovakia) Henrieta Nagyová | 6–3, 4–0 ret. |
| Sopot | 2003 | (Israel) Anna Smashnova | (Czech Republic) Klára Zakopalová | 6–2, 6–0 |
| Sopot | 2004 | (Italy) Flavia Pennetta | (Czech Republic) Klára Zakopalová | 7–5, 3–6, 6–3 |

=== Men's doubles ===
| Location | Year | Champions | Runners-up | Score |
|---|---|---|---|---|
| Sopot | 2001 | (Australia) Paul Hanley (Australia) Nathan Healey | (Georgia (country)) Irakli Labadze (Hungary) Attila Sávolt | 7–6^{(12–10)}, 6–2 |
| Sopot | 2002 | (Czech Republic) František Čermák (Czech Republic) Leoš Friedl | (South Africa) Jeff Coetzee (Australia) Nathan Healey | 7–5, 7–5 |
| Sopot | 2003 | (Poland) Mariusz Fyrstenberg (Poland) Marcin Matkowski | (Czech Republic) František Čermák (Czech Republic) Leoš Friedl | 6–4, 6–7^{(7–9)}, 6–3 |
| Sopot | 2004 | (Czech Republic) František Čermák (Czech Republic) Leoš Friedl | (Argentina) Martín García (Argentina) Sebastián Prieto | 2–6, 6–2, 6–3 |
| Sopot | 2005 | (Poland) Mariusz Fyrstenberg (Poland) Marcin Matkowski | (Argentina) Lucas Arnold Ker (Argentina) Sebastián Prieto | 7–6^{(9–7)}, 6–4 |
| Sopot | 2006 | (Czech Republic) František Čermák (Czech Republic) Leoš Friedl | (Argentina) Martín García (Argentina) Sebastián Prieto | 6–3, 7–5 |
| Sopot | 2007 | (Poland) Mariusz Fyrstenberg (Poland) Marcin Matkowski | (Argentina) Martín García (Argentina) Sebastián Prieto | 6–1, 6–1 |
| Warsaw | 2008 | (Poland) Mariusz Fyrstenberg (Poland) Marcin Matkowski | (Russia) Nikolay Davydenko (Kazakhstan) Yuri Schukin | 6–0, 3–6, [10–4] |

=== Women's doubles ===
| Location | Year | Champions | Runners-up | Score |
|---|---|---|---|---|
| Sopot | 1998 | (Czech Republic) Květa Peschke (Czech Republic) Helena Vildová | (Sweden) Åsa Carlsson (Netherlands) Seda Noorlander | 6–3, 6–2 |
| Sopot | 1999 | (Argentina) Laura Montalvo (Argentina) Paola Suárez | (Spain) Gala León García (Spain) María Sánchez Lorenzo | 6–4, 6–3 |
| Sopot | 2000 | (Spain) Virginia Ruano Pascual (Argentina) Paola Suárez | (Sweden) Åsa Carlsson (Italy) Rita Grande | 7–5, 6–1 |
| Sopot | 2001 | (South Africa) Joannette Kruger (Italy) Francesca Schiavone | (Ukraine) Yulia Beygelzimer (Russia) Anastasia Rodionova | 6–4, 6–0 |
| Sopot | 2002 | (Russia) Svetlana Kuznetsova (Spain) Arantxa Sánchez Vicario | (Russia) Evgenia Kulikovskaya (Russia) Ekaterina Sysoeva | 6–2, 6–2 |
| Sopot | 2003 | (Ukraine) Tatiana Perebiynis (Croatia) Silvija Talaja | (Estonia) Maret Ani (Czech Republic) Libuše Průšová | 6–4, 6–2 |
| Sopot | 2004 | (Spain) Nuria Llagostera Vives (Spain) Marta Marrero | (Poland) Klaudia Jans (Poland) Alicja Rosolska | 6–4, 6–3 |

== See also ==
- List of tennis tournaments
- Warsaw Open
- WTA Poland Open
- Katowice Open
