= Anne-Gaëlle Sidot =

French tennis player

- Country (sports): France
- Born: 24 July 1979 (age 46) Enghien-les-Bains, France
- Height: 1.72 m (5 ft 7 1/2 in)
- Turned pro: 1994
- Retired: 2002
- Plays: Left-handed (one-handed backhand)
- Prize money: US$1,236,925

Singles
- Career record: 215–174
- Career titles: 0 WTA, 7 ITF
- Highest ranking: No. 24 (14 August 2000)

Grand Slam singles results
- Australian Open: 3R (1998)
- French Open: 3R (2000)
- Wimbledon: 3R (2000)
- US Open: 3R (1996)

Doubles
- Career record: 112–125
- Career titles: 2 WTA, 3 ITF
- Highest ranking: No. 15 (9 July 2001)

Grand Slam doubles results
- Australian Open: 2R (1999-01)
- French Open: 3R (2000)
- Wimbledon: QF (1999)
- US Open: 3R (1998, 2000)

Team competitions
- Fed Cup: W (1997)

Anne-Gaëlle Sidot (born 24 July 1979) is a former professional tennis player from France.

== Career ==
Sidot turned professional in 1994. Her best Grand Slam singles performances were reaching the third round exactly once in each of the four Grand Slam tournaments. She won two WTA Tour doubles titles in Leipzig in 2000 and Nice in 2001, and was the runner-up in Los Angeles and Zürich in 2000. She also reached the quarterfinals of the 1999 Wimbledon women's doubles with Kristie Boogert of the Netherlands.

She represented her country in the Fed Cup in 1997, and retired from the tour in 2002.

== WTA career finals ==
=== Doubles 4 (2 titles, 2 runner-ups) ===
Legend
Tier I (0–1)
Tier II (2–1)
Tier III (0–0)
Tier IV & V (0–0)

Result	W/L	Date	Tournament	Surface	Partner	Opponents	Score
Loss	0–1	Aug 2000	Los Angeles, U.S.	Hard	(United States) Kimberly Po	(Belgium) Els Callens (Belgium) Dominique Van Roost	2–6, 5–7
Loss	0–2	Oct 2000	Zurich, Switzerland	Hard (i)	(United States) Kimberly Po	(Switzerland) Martina Hingis (Russia) Anna Kournikova	3–6, 4–6
Win	1–2	Nov 2000	Leipzig, Germany	Carpet (i)	(Spain) Arantxa Sánchez Vicario	(Belgium) Kim Clijsters (France) Laurence Courtois	6–7^{(6)}, 7–5, 6–3
Win	2–2	Feb 2001	Nice, France	Carpet (i)	(France) Émilie Loit	(United States) Kimberly Po (France) Nathalie Tauziat	1–6, 6–2, 6–0

== ITF Circuit finals ==
$100,000 tournaments
$75,000 tournaments
$50,000 tournaments
$25,000 tournaments
$10,000 tournaments

=== Singles (7–4) ===
Result	No.	Date	Tournament	Surface	Opponent	Score
Win	1.	1 August 1994	Casablanca, Morocco	Clay	(Greece) Christina Zachariadou	6–1, 7–5
Loss	2.	14 August 1994	Carthage, Tunisia	Clay	(Tunisia) Selima Sfar	7–5, 3–6, 4–6
Win	3.	3 October 1994	Nottingham, United Kingdom	Carpet (i)	(United Kingdom) Lucie Ahl	6–4, 6–2
Loss	4.	21 August 1995	Sochi, Russia	Clay	(United States) Corina Morariu	4–6, 6–4, 0–6
Win	5.	16 October 1995	Flensburg, Germany	Carpet (i)	(Slovakia) Katarína Studeníková	4–6, 6–4, 2–1 ret.
Win	6.	5 February 1996	Würzburg, Germany	Carpet (i)	(Netherlands) Stephanie Rottier	6–4, 6–1
Loss	7.	13 May 1996	Bordeaux, France	Clay	(Belgium) Stephanie Devillé	4–6, 5–7
Win	8.	14 October 1996	Cardiff, United Kingdom	Hard (i)	(Germany) Wiltrud Probst	6–1, 7–5
Win	9.	2 December 1996	Cergy-Pontoise, France	Hard (i)	(Italy) Flora Perfetti	6–2, 6–7^{(5)}, 6–1
Loss	10.	1 December 1997	Cergy-Pontoise, France	Hard (i)	(Italy) Laura Golarsa	6–4, 5–7, 6–7
Win	11.	18 October 1998	Southampton, United Kingdom	Carpet (i)	(France) Amélie Cocheteux	7–5, 6–4

=== Doubles (3–1) ===
Result	No.	Date	Tournament	Surface	Partner	Opponents	Score
Win	1.	19 May 1996	Bordeaux, France	Clay	(France) Karine Quentrec	(Belarus) Olga Barabanschikova (Italy) Alice Canepa	6–2, 6–3
Win	2.	20 October 1996	Cardiff, United Kingdom	Hard (i)	(Sweden) Maria Strandlund	(United Kingdom) Shirli-Ann Siddall (United Kingdom) Amanda Wainwright	6–3, 6–3
Loss	3.	7 December 1997	Cergy-Pontoise, France	Hard (i)	(France) Julie Halard-Decugis	(Netherlands) Kristie Boogert (Netherlands) Miriam Oremans	5–7, 4–6
Win	4.	6 December 1998	Cergy-Pontoise, France	Hard (i)	(Netherlands) Kristie Boogert	(France) Caroline Dhenin (France) Émilie Loit	7–5, 6–2
