= 1999 WTA Tour =

Women's tennis circuit

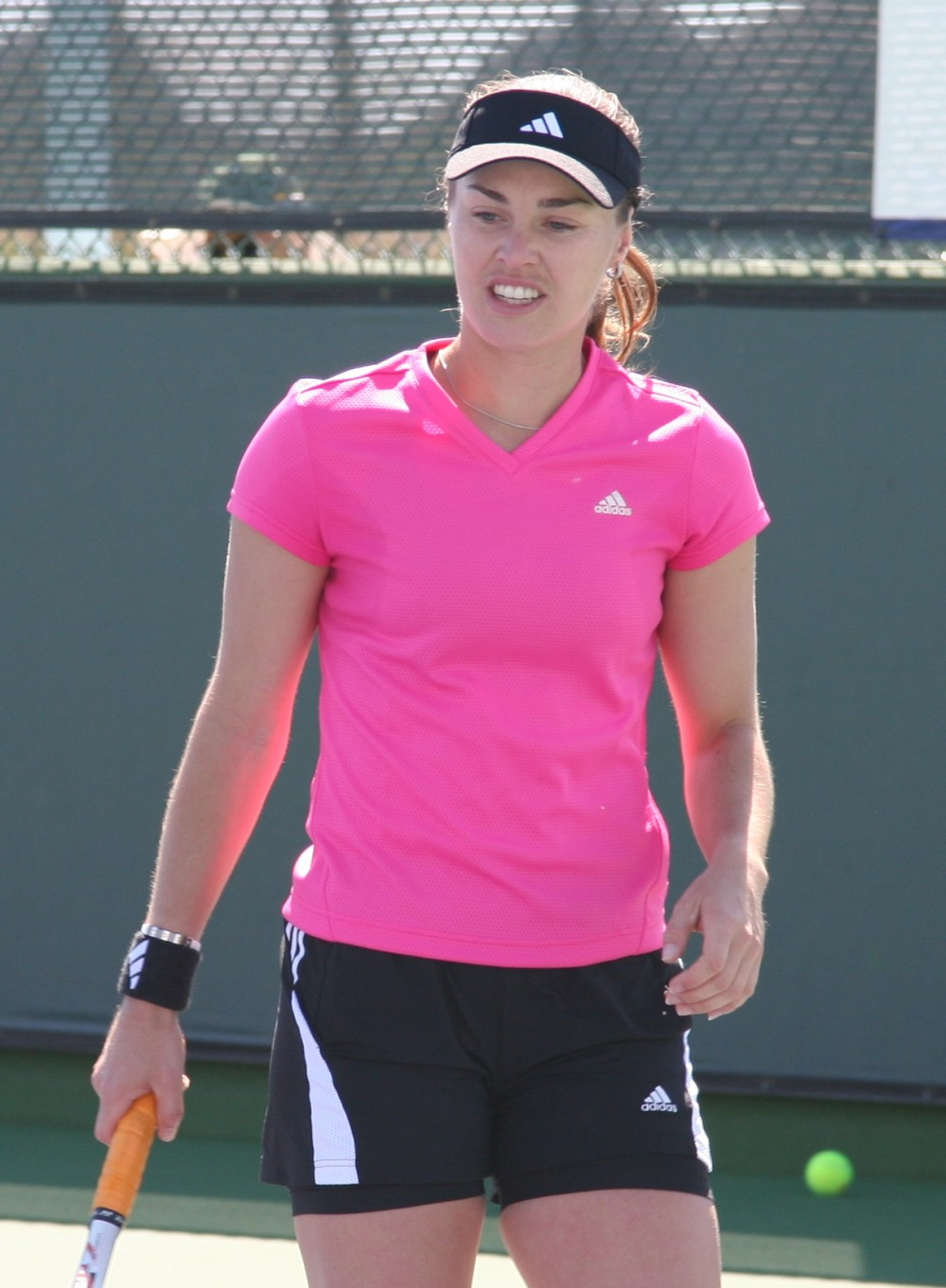
- Martina Hingis finished the year as WTA world No. 1 for the second time in her career, though Lindsay Davenport was named the Player of the Year. Hingis won seven tournaments during the season, including a major at the Australian Open. She also won four Tier I events and finished runner-up at two other majors, the French Open and the US Open. Davenport won seven tournaments during the season, including a major at the Wimbledon Championships, as well as the WTA Tour Championships.

Details
- Duration: January 2 – November 22, 1999
- Edition: 29th
- Tournaments: 58
- Categories: Grand Slam (4); WTA Championships; Grand Slam Cup; WTA Tier I (9); WTA Tier II (15); WTA Tier III (12); WTA Tier IV (16)

Achievements (singles)
- Most titles: (Switzerland) Martina Hingis (7) (United States) Lindsay Davenport (7)
- Most finals: (Switzerland) Martina Hingis (13)
- Prize money leader: (Switzerland) Martina Hingis (US$3,291,780)
- Points leader: (Switzerland) Martina Hingis (6,074)

Awards
- Player of the year: (United States) Lindsay Davenport
- Doubles team of the year: (Switzerland) Martina Hingis (Russia) Anna Kournikova
- Most improved player of the year: (United States) Serena Williams
- Newcomer of the year: (Belgium) Kim Clijsters
- Comeback player of the year: (Belgium) Sabine Appelmans

The WTA Tour is the elite tour for professional women's tennis organised by the Women's Tennis Association (WTA). The WTA Tour includes the four Grand Slam tournaments, the WTA Tour Championships and the WTA Tier I, Tier II, Tier III and Tier IV events. ITF tournaments are not part of the WTA Tour, although they award points for the WTA World Ranking.

== Schedule ==
This is the complete schedule of events on the 1999 WTA Tour. Player progression is documented from the quarterfinals stage.

=== Key ===
Grand Slam events
Year-end championships
WTA Tier I tournaments
WTA Tier II tournaments
WTA Tier III tournaments
WTA Tier IV tournaments
Team events

=== January ===
Week	Tournament	Champions	Runners-up	Semifinalists	Quarterfinalists
2 Jan	Hyundai Hopman Cup; Perth, Australia; ITF Mixed Teams Championships; Hard (i) – A$1,000,000 – 9 teams (RR)	Australia; 2–1	Sweden	Round robin (Group A) South Africa; France; Spain	Round robin (Group B) United States; Switzerland; Slovakia
2 Jan	Thalgo Australian Women's Hardcourts; Gold Coast, Australia; Tier III event Hard – $180,000 – 32S/32Q/16D; Singles – Doubles	(Switzerland) Patty Schnyder; 4–6, 7–6^{(7–5)}, 6–2	(France) Mary Pierce	(Romania) Irina Spîrlea (Japan) Ai Sugiyama	(France) Nathalie Dechy (Germany) Anke Huber (United States) Brie Rippner (Spain) Magüi Serna
2 Jan	Thalgo Australian Women's Hardcourts; Gold Coast, Australia; Tier III event Hard – $180,000 – 32S/32Q/16D; Singles – Doubles	(United States) Corina Morariu (Latvia) Larisa Neiland; 6–3, 6–3	(Australia) Kristine Kunce (Romania) Irina Spîrlea	(Romania) Irina Spîrlea (Japan) Ai Sugiyama	(France) Nathalie Dechy (Germany) Anke Huber (United States) Brie Rippner (Spain) Magüi Serna
2 Jan	ASB Classic; Auckland, New Zealand; Tier IV event Hard – $112,500 – 32S/32Q/16D; Singles – Doubles	(France) Julie Halard-Decugis; 6–4, 6–1	(Belgium) Dominique van Roost	(Austria) Barbara Schett (Italy) Silvia Farina	(United States) Kristina Brandi (United States) Lisa Raymond (Spain) María Sánchez Lorenzo (United States) Chanda Rubin
2 Jan	ASB Classic; Auckland, New Zealand; Tier IV event Hard – $112,500 – 32S/32Q/16D; Singles – Doubles	(Italy) Silvia Farina (Austria) Barbara Schett; 6–2, 7–6^{(7–2)}	(Netherlands) Seda Noorlander (Germany) Marlene Weingärtner	(Austria) Barbara Schett (Italy) Silvia Farina	(United States) Kristina Brandi (United States) Lisa Raymond (Spain) María Sánchez Lorenzo (United States) Chanda Rubin
11 Jan	Sydney International; Sydney, Australia; Tier II event Hard – $420,000 – 28S/32Q/16D; Singles – Doubles	(United States) Lindsay Davenport; 6–4, 6–3	(Switzerland) Martina Hingis	(Germany) Steffi Graf (Austria) Barbara Schett	(Switzerland) Patty Schnyder (United States) Venus Williams (Spain) Arantxa Sánchez Vicario (Belgium) Dominique van Roost
11 Jan	Sydney International; Sydney, Australia; Tier II event Hard – $420,000 – 28S/32Q/16D; Singles – Doubles	(Russia) Elena Likhovtseva (Japan) Ai Sugiyama; 6–3, 2–6, 6–0	(United States) Mary Joe Fernández (Germany) Anke Huber	(Germany) Steffi Graf (Austria) Barbara Schett	(Switzerland) Patty Schnyder (United States) Venus Williams (Spain) Arantxa Sánchez Vicario (Belgium) Dominique van Roost
11 Jan	ANZ Tasmanian International; Hobart, Australia; Tier IV event Hard – $112,500 – 32S/32Q/16D; Singles – Doubles	(United States) Chanda Rubin; 6–2, 6–3	(Italy) Rita Grande	(France) Julie Halard-Decugis (United States) Amy Frazier	(Zimbabwe) Cara Black (France) Sarah Pitkowski (Spain) Virginia Ruano Pascual (France) Nathalie Dechy
11 Jan	ANZ Tasmanian International; Hobart, Australia; Tier IV event Hard – $112,500 – 32S/32Q/16D; Singles – Doubles	(South Africa) Mariaan de Swardt (Ukraine) Elena Tatarkova; 6–1, 6–2	(France) Alexia Dechaume-Balleret (France) Émilie Loit	(France) Julie Halard-Decugis (United States) Amy Frazier	(Zimbabwe) Cara Black (France) Sarah Pitkowski (Spain) Virginia Ruano Pascual (France) Nathalie Dechy
18 Jan; 25 Jan	Australian Open; Melbourne, Australia; Grand Slam; Hard – $3,124,386 – 128S/96Q/64D/32X; Singles – Doubles – Mixed doubles	(Switzerland) Martina Hingis; 6–2, 6–3	(France) Amélie Mauresmo	(United States) Lindsay Davenport (United States) Monica Seles	(United States) Venus Williams (Belgium) Dominique van Roost (Germany) Steffi Graf (France) Mary Pierce
18 Jan; 25 Jan	Australian Open; Melbourne, Australia; Grand Slam; Hard – $3,124,386 – 128S/96Q/64D/32X; Singles – Doubles – Mixed doubles	(Switzerland) Martina Hingis (Russia) Anna Kournikova; 7–5, 6–3	(United States) Lindsay Davenport (Belarus) Natasha Zvereva	(United States) Lindsay Davenport (United States) Monica Seles	(United States) Venus Williams (Belgium) Dominique van Roost (Germany) Steffi Graf (France) Mary Pierce
18 Jan; 25 Jan	Australian Open; Melbourne, Australia; Grand Slam; Hard – $3,124,386 – 128S/96Q/64D/32X; Singles – Doubles – Mixed doubles	(South Africa) David Adams (South Africa) Mariaan de Swardt; 6–4, 4–6, 7–6^{(7–5)}	(Belarus) Max Mirnyi (United States) Serena Williams	(United States) Lindsay Davenport (United States) Monica Seles	(United States) Venus Williams (Belgium) Dominique van Roost (Germany) Steffi Graf (France) Mary Pierce

=== February ===
Week	Tournament	Champions	Runners-up	Semifinalists	Quarterfinalists
1 Feb	Toray Pan Pacific Open; Tokyo, Japan; Tier I event Carpet (i) – $1,050,000 – 28S/32Q/16D; Singles – Doubles	(Switzerland) Martina Hingis; 6–2, 6–1	(South Africa) Amanda Coetzer	(United States) Monica Seles (Czech Republic) Jana Novotná	(United States) Lindsay Davenport (Russia) Anna Kournikova (Belarus) Natasha Zvereva (Germany) Steffi Graf
1 Feb	Toray Pan Pacific Open; Tokyo, Japan; Tier I event Carpet (i) – $1,050,000 – 28S/32Q/16D; Singles – Doubles	(United States) Lindsay Davenport (Belarus) Natasha Zvereva; 6–2, 6–3	(Switzerland) Martina Hingis (Czech Republic) Jana Novotná	(United States) Monica Seles (Czech Republic) Jana Novotná	(United States) Lindsay Davenport (Russia) Anna Kournikova (Belarus) Natasha Zvereva (Germany) Steffi Graf
8 Feb	Nokia Cup; Prostějov, Czech Republic; Tier IV event Carpet (i) – $112,500 – 32S/32Q/16D; Singles – Doubles	(Slovakia) Henrieta Nagyová; 7–6^{(7–2)}, 6–4	(Italy) Silvia Farina	(France) Alexia Dechaume-Balleret (Netherlands) Amanda Hopmans	(France) Amélie Cocheteux (France) Nathalie Dechy (Czech Republic) Lenka Němečková (Germany) Julia Abe
8 Feb	Nokia Cup; Prostějov, Czech Republic; Tier IV event Carpet (i) – $112,500 – 32S/32Q/16D; Singles – Doubles	(France) Alexandra Fusai (France) Nathalie Tauziat; 3–6, 6–2, 6–1	(Czech Republic) Květa Hrdličková (Czech Republic) Helena Vildová	(France) Alexia Dechaume-Balleret (Netherlands) Amanda Hopmans	(France) Amélie Cocheteux (France) Nathalie Dechy (Czech Republic) Lenka Němečková (Germany) Julia Abe
15 Feb	Faber Grand Prix; Hanover, Germany; Tier II event Hard (i) – $450,000 – 28S/32Q/16D; Singles – Doubles	(Czech Republic) Jana Novotná; 6–4, 6–4	(United States) Venus Williams	(Russia) Elena Likhovtseva (Germany) Steffi Graf	(France) Sandrine Testud (Netherlands) Miriam Oremans (Austria) Barbara Schett (Germany) Barbara Rittner
15 Feb	Faber Grand Prix; Hanover, Germany; Tier II event Hard (i) – $450,000 – 28S/32Q/16D; Singles – Doubles	(United States) Serena Williams (United States) Venus Williams; 5–7, 6–2, 6–2	(France) Alexandra Fusai (France) Nathalie Tauziat	(Russia) Elena Likhovtseva (Germany) Steffi Graf	(France) Sandrine Testud (Netherlands) Miriam Oremans (Austria) Barbara Schett (Germany) Barbara Rittner
15 Feb	Copa Colsanitas; Bogotá, Colombia; Tier IV event Clay – $142,500 – 32S/32Q/16D; Singles – Doubles	(Colombia) Fabiola Zuluaga; 6–1, 6–3	(Greece) Christína Papadáki	(United States) Meghann Shaughnessy (Argentina) Paola Suárez	(China) Li Fang (Paraguay) Larissa Schaerer (Brazil) Vanessa Menga (Italy) Tathiana Garbin
15 Feb	Copa Colsanitas; Bogotá, Colombia; Tier IV event Clay – $142,500 – 32S/32Q/16D; Singles – Doubles	(Netherlands) Seda Noorlander (Greece) Christína Papadáki; 6–4, 7–6^{(7–5)}	(Argentina) Laura Montalvo (Argentina) Paola Suárez	(United States) Meghann Shaughnessy (Argentina) Paola Suárez	(China) Li Fang (Paraguay) Larissa Schaerer (Brazil) Vanessa Menga (Italy) Tathiana Garbin
22 Feb	Open Gaz de France; Paris, France; Tier II event Hard (i) – $520,000 – 28S/32Q/16D; Singles – Doubles	(United States) Serena Williams; 6–2, 3–6, 7–6^{(7–4)}	(France) Amélie Mauresmo	(Belgium) Dominique van Roost (France) Nathalie Dechy	(Switzerland) Martina Hingis (Russia) Elena Likhovtseva (France) Amélie Cocheteux (France) Julie Halard-Decugis
22 Feb	Open Gaz de France; Paris, France; Tier II event Hard (i) – $520,000 – 28S/32Q/16D; Singles – Doubles	(Romania) Irina Spîrlea (Netherlands) Caroline Vis; 7–5, 3–6, 6–3	(Russia) Elena Likhovtseva (Japan) Ai Sugiyama	(Belgium) Dominique van Roost (France) Nathalie Dechy	(Switzerland) Martina Hingis (Russia) Elena Likhovtseva (France) Amélie Cocheteux (France) Julie Halard-Decugis
22 Feb	IGA Superthrift Classic; Oklahoma City, United States; Tier III event Hard (i) – $180,000 – 30S/32Q/16D; Singles – Doubles	(United States) Venus Williams; 6–4, 6–0	(South Africa) Amanda Coetzer	(United States) Lilia Osterloh (Russia) Anna Kournikova	(United States) Alexandra Stevenson (United States) Jane Chi (Zimbabwe) Cara Black (United States) Chanda Rubin
22 Feb	IGA Superthrift Classic; Oklahoma City, United States; Tier III event Hard (i) – $180,000 – 30S/32Q/16D; Singles – Doubles	(United States) Lisa Raymond (Australia) Rennae Stubbs; 6–3, 6–4	(South Africa) Amanda Coetzer (South Africa) Jessica Steck	(United States) Lilia Osterloh (Russia) Anna Kournikova	(United States) Alexandra Stevenson (United States) Jane Chi (Zimbabwe) Cara Black (United States) Chanda Rubin

=== March ===
Week	Tournament	Champions	Runners-up	Semifinalists	Quarterfinalists
1 Mar; 8 Mar	Evert Cup; Indian Wells, United States; Tier I event Hard – $1,400,000 – 56S/32Q/28D; Singles – Doubles	(United States) Serena Williams; 6–3, 3–6, 7–5	(Germany) Steffi Graf	(United States) Chanda Rubin (France) Sandrine Testud	(Switzerland) Martina Hingis (Czech Republic) Jana Novotná (Slovakia) Henrieta Nagyová (France) Mary Pierce
1 Mar; 8 Mar	Evert Cup; Indian Wells, United States; Tier I event Hard – $1,400,000 – 56S/32Q/28D; Singles – Doubles	(Switzerland) Martina Hingis (Russia) Anna Kournikova; 6–2, 6–2	(United States) Mary Joe Fernández (Czech Republic) Jana Novotná	(United States) Chanda Rubin (France) Sandrine Testud	(Switzerland) Martina Hingis (Czech Republic) Jana Novotná (Slovakia) Henrieta Nagyová (France) Mary Pierce
15 Mar; 22 Mar	Lipton Championships; Key Biscayne, United States; Tier I event Hard – $2,075,000 – 96S/64Q/48D; Singles – Doubles	(United States) Venus Williams; 6–1, 4–6, 6–4	(United States) Serena Williams	(Switzerland) Martina Hingis (Germany) Steffi Graf	(Austria) Barbara Schett (South Africa) Amanda Coetzer (Czech Republic) Jana Novotná (United States) Lindsay Davenport
15 Mar; 22 Mar	Lipton Championships; Key Biscayne, United States; Tier I event Hard – $2,075,000 – 96S/64Q/48D; Singles – Doubles	(Switzerland) Martina Hingis (Czech Republic) Jana Novotná; 0–6, 6–4, 7–6^{(7–1)}	(United States) Mary Joe Fernández (United States) Monica Seles	(Switzerland) Martina Hingis (Germany) Steffi Graf	(Austria) Barbara Schett (South Africa) Amanda Coetzer (Czech Republic) Jana Novotná (United States) Lindsay Davenport
29 Mar	Family Circle Cup; Hilton Head Island, United States; Tier I event Clay – $1,050,000 (green) – 56S/32Q/28D; Singles – Doubles	(Switzerland) Martina Hingis; 6–4, 6–3	(Russia) Anna Kournikova	(Czech Republic) Jana Novotná (Switzerland) Patty Schnyder	(Belarus) Natasha Zvereva (Slovakia) Henrieta Nagyová (Germany) Andrea Glass (Russia) Elena Likhovtseva
29 Mar	Family Circle Cup; Hilton Head Island, United States; Tier I event Clay – $1,050,000 (green) – 56S/32Q/28D; Singles – Doubles	(Russia) Elena Likhovtseva (Czech Republic) Jana Novotná; 6–1, 6–4	(Austria) Barbara Schett (Switzerland) Patty Schnyder	(Czech Republic) Jana Novotná (Switzerland) Patty Schnyder	(Belarus) Natasha Zvereva (Slovakia) Henrieta Nagyová (Germany) Andrea Glass (Russia) Elena Likhovtseva

=== April ===
Week	Tournament	Champions	Runners-up	Semifinalists	Quarterfinalists
5 Apr	Bausch & Lomb Championships; Amelia Island, United States; Tier II event Clay – $520,000 (green) – 56S/32Q/28D; Singles – Doubles	(United States) Monica Seles; 6–2, 6–3	(Romania) Ruxandra Dragomir	(Russia) Anna Kournikova (Spain) Conchita Martínez	(Switzerland) Patty Schnyder (Colombia) Fabiola Zuluaga (France) Mary Pierce (South Africa) Amanda Coetzer
5 Apr	Bausch & Lomb Championships; Amelia Island, United States; Tier II event Clay – $520,000 (green) – 56S/32Q/28D; Singles – Doubles	(Spain) Conchita Martínez (Argentina) Patricia Tarabini; 7–5, 0–6, 6–4	(United States) Lisa Raymond (Australia) Rennae Stubbs	(Russia) Anna Kournikova (Spain) Conchita Martínez	(Switzerland) Patty Schnyder (Colombia) Fabiola Zuluaga (France) Mary Pierce (South Africa) Amanda Coetzer
5 Apr	Estoril Open; Oeiras, Portugal; Tier IV event Clay – $142,500 – 32S/32Q/16D; Singles – Doubles	(Slovenia) Katarina Srebotnik; 6–3, 6–1	(Hungary) Rita Kuti-Kis	(Argentina) Mariana Díaz Oliva (Bulgaria) Lubomira Bacheva	(Germany) Anca Barna (Luxembourg) Anne Kremer (Croatia) Silvija Talaja (Spain) Cristina Torrens Valero
5 Apr	Estoril Open; Oeiras, Portugal; Tier IV event Clay – $142,500 – 32S/32Q/16D; Singles – Doubles	(Spain) Alicia Ortuño (Spain) Cristina Torrens Valero; 7–6^{(7–4)}, 3–6, 6–3	(Hungary) Anna Földényi (Hungary) Rita Kuti-Kis	(Argentina) Mariana Díaz Oliva (Bulgaria) Lubomira Bacheva	(Germany) Anca Barna (Luxembourg) Anne Kremer (Croatia) Silvija Talaja (Spain) Cristina Torrens Valero
12 Apr	Japan Open; Tokyo, Japan; Tier III event Hard – $180,000 – 32S/32Q/16D; Singles – Doubles	(United States) Amy Frazier; 6–2, 6–2	(Japan) Ai Sugiyama	(United States) Jane Chi (United States) Corina Morariu	(Chinese Taipei) Janet Lee (Czech Republic) Sandra Kleinová (Chinese Taipei) Wang Shi-ting (United States) Meilen Tu
12 Apr	Japan Open; Tokyo, Japan; Tier III event Hard – $180,000 – 32S/32Q/16D; Singles – Doubles	(United States) Corina Morariu (United States) Kimberly Po; 6–3, 6–2	(Australia) Catherine Barclay (Australia) Kerry-Anne Guse	(United States) Jane Chi (United States) Corina Morariu	(Chinese Taipei) Janet Lee (Czech Republic) Sandra Kleinová (Chinese Taipei) Wang Shi-ting (United States) Meilen Tu
12 Apr	Fed Cup: Quarterfinals; Reggio Calabria, Italy – carpet (i); Raleigh, United States – clay Moscow, Russia – carpet (i); Zürich, Switzerland – carpet (i)	Quarterfinals Winners; Italy 3–2; United States 5–0; Russia 3–2; Slovakia 5–0	Quarterfinals Losers; Spain; Croatia; France; Switzerland		
19 Apr	Dreamland Egypt Classic; Cairo, Egypt; Tier III event Hard – $180,000 – 30S/32Q/16D; Singles – Doubles	(Spain) Arantxa Sánchez Vicario; 6–1, 6–0	(Romania) Irina Spîrlea	(Switzerland) Emmanuelle Gagliardi (Canada) Maureen Drake	(Australia) Jelena Dokić (Belgium) Laurence Courtois (Switzerland) Patty Schnyder (France) Mary Pierce
19 Apr	Dreamland Egypt Classic; Cairo, Egypt; Tier III event Hard – $180,000 – 30S/32Q/16D; Singles – Doubles	(Belgium) Laurence Courtois (Spain) Arantxa Sánchez Vicario; 5–7, 6–1, 7–6^{(7–3)}	(Romania) Irina Spîrlea (Netherlands) Caroline Vis	(Switzerland) Emmanuelle Gagliardi (Canada) Maureen Drake	(Australia) Jelena Dokić (Belgium) Laurence Courtois (Switzerland) Patty Schnyder (France) Mary Pierce
19 Apr	Westel 900 Budapest Open; Budapest, Hungary; Tier IV event Clay – $142,500 – 32S/32Q/16D; Singles – Doubles	(France) Sarah Pitkowski; 6–2, 6–2	(Spain) Cristina Torrens Valero	(Czech Republic) Denisa Chládková (Hungary) Rita Kuti-Kis	(Czech Republic) Eva Martincová (Netherlands) Amanda Hopmans (Czech Republic) Lenka Němečková (Russia) Evgenia Koulikovskaya
19 Apr	Westel 900 Budapest Open; Budapest, Hungary; Tier IV event Clay – $142,500 – 32S/32Q/16D; Singles – Doubles	(Russia) Evgenia Koulikovskaya (Federal Republic of Yugoslavia) Sandra Naćuk; 6–3, 6–4	(Argentina) Laura Montalvo (Spain) Virginia Ruano Pascual	(Czech Republic) Denisa Chládková (Hungary) Rita Kuti-Kis	(Czech Republic) Eva Martincová (Netherlands) Amanda Hopmans (Czech Republic) Lenka Němečková (Russia) Evgenia Koulikovskaya
26 Apr	Betty Barclay Cup; Hamburg, Germany; Tier II event Clay – $520,000 – 28S/32Q/16D; Singles – Doubles	(United States) Venus Williams; 6–0, 6–3	(France) Mary Pierce	(Austria) Barbara Schett (Spain) Arantxa Sánchez Vicario	(Czech Republic) Jana Novotná (Spain) Conchita Martínez (Italy) Silvia Farina (South Africa) Amanda Coetzer
26 Apr	Betty Barclay Cup; Hamburg, Germany; Tier II event Clay – $520,000 – 28S/32Q/16D; Singles – Doubles	(Spain) Arantxa Sánchez Vicario (Latvia) Larisa Neiland; 6–2, 6–1	(South Africa) Amanda Coetzer (Czech Republic) Jana Novotná	(Austria) Barbara Schett (Spain) Arantxa Sánchez Vicario	(Czech Republic) Jana Novotná (Spain) Conchita Martínez (Italy) Silvia Farina (South Africa) Amanda Coetzer
26 Apr	Croatian Bol Ladies Open; Bol, Croatia; Tier IV event Clay – $142,500 – 32S/32Q/16D; Singles – Doubles	(United States) Corina Morariu; 6–2, 6–0	(France) Julie Halard-Decugis	(France) Sarah Pitkowski (Spain) Conchita Martínez Granados	(Spain) Cristina Torrens Valero (Czech Republic) Sandra Kleinová (Czech Republic) Adriana Gerši (Croatia) Jelena Kostanić
26 Apr	Croatian Bol Ladies Open; Bol, Croatia; Tier IV event Clay – $142,500 – 32S/32Q/16D; Singles – Doubles	(Croatia) Jelena Kostanić (Czech Republic) Michaela Paštiková; 7–5, 6–7^{(1–7)}, 6–2	(United States) Meghann Shaughnessy (Romania) Andreea Vanc	(France) Sarah Pitkowski (Spain) Conchita Martínez Granados	(Spain) Cristina Torrens Valero (Czech Republic) Sandra Kleinová (Czech Republic) Adriana Gerši (Croatia) Jelena Kostanić

=== May ===
Week	Tournament	Champions	Runners-up	Semifinalists	Quarterfinalists
3 May	Italian Open; Rome, Italy; Tier I event Clay – $1,050,000 – 56S/32Q/28D; Singles – Doubles	(United States) Venus Williams; 6–4, 6–2	(France) Mary Pierce	(Switzerland) Martina Hingis (France) Amélie Mauresmo	(United States) Serena Williams (Belgium) Dominique van Roost (France) Sandrine Testud (Austria) Sylvia Plischke
3 May	Italian Open; Rome, Italy; Tier I event Clay – $1,050,000 – 56S/32Q/28D; Singles – Doubles	(Switzerland) Martina Hingis (Russia) Anna Kournikova; 6–2, 6–2	(France) Alexandra Fusai (France) Nathalie Tauziat	(Switzerland) Martina Hingis (France) Amélie Mauresmo	(United States) Serena Williams (Belgium) Dominique van Roost (France) Sandrine Testud (Austria) Sylvia Plischke
3 May	Warsaw Cup by Heros; Warsaw, Poland; Tier IV event Clay – $112,500 – 32S/32Q/16D; Singles – Doubles	(Spain) Cristina Torrens Valero; 7–5, 7–6^{(7–3)}	(Argentina) Inés Gorrochategui	(Croatia) Silvija Talaja (Slovenia) Tina Pisnik	(Belarus) Olga Barabanschikova (France) Amélie Cocheteux (Slovakia) Henrieta Nagyová (Australia) Jelena Dokić
3 May	Warsaw Cup by Heros; Warsaw, Poland; Tier IV event Clay – $112,500 – 32S/32Q/16D; Singles – Doubles	(Romania) Cătălina Cristea (Kazakhstan) Irina Selyutina; 6–1, 6–2	(France) Amélie Cocheteux (Slovakia) Janette Husárová	(Croatia) Silvija Talaja (Slovenia) Tina Pisnik	(Belarus) Olga Barabanschikova (France) Amélie Cocheteux (Slovakia) Henrieta Nagyová (Australia) Jelena Dokić
10 May	German Open; Berlin, Germany; Tier I event Clay – $1,050,000 – 56S/32Q/28D; Singles – Doubles	(Switzerland) Martina Hingis; 6–0, 6–1	(France) Julie Halard-Decugis	(Spain) Arantxa Sánchez Vicario (Romania) Ruxandra Dragomir	(Austria) Barbara Schett (United States) Serena Williams (Germany) Steffi Graf (Switzerland) Patty Schnyder
10 May	German Open; Berlin, Germany; Tier I event Clay – $1,050,000 – 56S/32Q/28D; Singles – Doubles	(France) Alexandra Fusai (France) Nathalie Tauziat; 6–3, 7–5	(Czech Republic) Jana Novotná (Argentina) Patricia Tarabini	(Spain) Arantxa Sánchez Vicario (Romania) Ruxandra Dragomir	(Austria) Barbara Schett (United States) Serena Williams (Germany) Steffi Graf (Switzerland) Patty Schnyder
10 May	Belgian Open; Antwerp, Belgium; Tier IV event Clay – $112,500 – 32S/32Q/16D; Singles – Doubles	(Belgium) Justine Henin; 6–1, 6–2	(France) Sarah Pitkowski	(Belgium) Els Callens (Netherlands) Kristie Boogert	(Belgium) Kim Clijsters (Sweden) Åsa Carlsson (Belarus) Olga Barabanschikova (Belgium) Sabine Appelmans
10 May	Belgian Open; Antwerp, Belgium; Tier IV event Clay – $112,500 – 32S/32Q/16D; Singles – Doubles	(Italy) Laura Golarsa (Slovenia) Katarina Srebotnik; 6–4, 6–2	(Australia) Louise Pleming (United States) Meghann Shaughnessy	(Belgium) Els Callens (Netherlands) Kristie Boogert	(Belgium) Kim Clijsters (Sweden) Åsa Carlsson (Belarus) Olga Barabanschikova (Belgium) Sabine Appelmans
17 May	Internationaux de Strasbourg; Strasbourg, France; Tier III event Clay – $190,000 – 30S/32Q/16D; Singles – Doubles	(United States) Jennifer Capriati; 6–1, 6–3	(Russia) Elena Likhovtseva	(Czech Republic) Denisa Chládková (United States) Mary Joe Fernández	(France) Nathalie Tauziat (Japan) Ai Sugiyama (France) Nathalie Dechy (United States) Corina Morariu
17 May	Internationaux de Strasbourg; Strasbourg, France; Tier III event Clay – $190,000 – 30S/32Q/16D; Singles – Doubles	(Russia) Elena Likhovtseva (Japan) Ai Sugiyama; 2–6, 7–6^{(8–6)}, 6–1	(France) Alexandra Fusai (France) Nathalie Tauziat	(Czech Republic) Denisa Chládková (United States) Mary Joe Fernández	(France) Nathalie Tauziat (Japan) Ai Sugiyama (France) Nathalie Dechy (United States) Corina Morariu
17 May	Madrid Open; Madrid, Spain; Tier III event Clay – $180,000 – 32S/32Q/16D; Singles – Doubles	(United States) Lindsay Davenport; 6–1, 6–3	(Argentina) Paola Suárez	(United States) Amy Frazier (United States) Chanda Rubin	(Israel) Anna Smashnova (Italy) Silvia Farina (Switzerland) Emmanuelle Gagliardi (Spain) Magüi Serna
17 May	Madrid Open; Madrid, Spain; Tier III event Clay – $180,000 – 32S/32Q/16D; Singles – Doubles	(Spain) Virginia Ruano Pascual (Argentina) Paola Suárez; 6–2, 0–6, 6–0	(Argentina) María Fernanda Landa (Germany) Marlene Weingärtner	(United States) Amy Frazier (United States) Chanda Rubin	(Israel) Anna Smashnova (Italy) Silvia Farina (Switzerland) Emmanuelle Gagliardi (Spain) Magüi Serna
24 May; 31 May	French Open; Paris, France; Grand Slam; Clay – $4,407,123 – 128S/96Q/64D/32X; Singles – Doubles – Mixed doubles	(Germany) Steffi Graf; 4–6, 7–5, 6–2	(Switzerland) Martina Hingis	(Spain) Arantxa Sánchez Vicario (United States) Monica Seles	(Austria) Barbara Schwartz (Austria) Sylvia Plischke (Spain) Conchita Martínez (United States) Lindsay Davenport
24 May; 31 May	French Open; Paris, France; Grand Slam; Clay – $4,407,123 – 128S/96Q/64D/32X; Singles – Doubles – Mixed doubles	(United States) Serena Williams (United States) Venus Williams; 6–3, 6–7^{(2–7)}, 8–6	(Switzerland) Martina Hingis (Russia) Anna Kournikova	(Spain) Arantxa Sánchez Vicario (United States) Monica Seles	(Austria) Barbara Schwartz (Austria) Sylvia Plischke (Spain) Conchita Martínez (United States) Lindsay Davenport
24 May; 31 May	French Open; Paris, France; Grand Slam; Clay – $4,407,123 – 128S/96Q/64D/32X; Singles – Doubles – Mixed doubles	(South Africa) Piet Norval (Slovenia) Katarina Srebotnik; 6–3, 3–6, 6–3	(United States) Rick Leach (Latvia) Larisa Neiland	(Spain) Arantxa Sánchez Vicario (United States) Monica Seles	(Austria) Barbara Schwartz (Austria) Sylvia Plischke (Spain) Conchita Martínez (United States) Lindsay Davenport

=== June ===
Week	Tournament	Champions	Runners-up	Semifinalists	Quarterfinalists
7 Jun	DFS Classic; Birmingham, Great Britain; Tier III event Grass – $180,000 – 48S/32Q/28D; Singles – Doubles	(France) Julie Halard-Decugis; 6–2, 3–6, 6–4	(France) Nathalie Tauziat	(Spain) Magüi Serna (Zimbabwe) Cara Black	(United States) Nicole Arendt (United States) Alexandra Stevenson (Belarus) Natasha Zvereva (Argentina) Inés Gorrochategui
7 Jun	DFS Classic; Birmingham, Great Britain; Tier III event Grass – $180,000 – 48S/32Q/28D; Singles – Doubles	(United States) Corina Morariu (Latvia) Larisa Neiland; 6–4, 6–4	(France) Alexandra Fusai (Argentina) Inés Gorrochategui	(Spain) Magüi Serna (Zimbabwe) Cara Black	(United States) Nicole Arendt (United States) Alexandra Stevenson (Belarus) Natasha Zvereva (Argentina) Inés Gorrochategui
7 Jun	Tashkent Open; Tashkent, Uzbekistan; Tier IV event Hard – $112,500 – 32S/32Q/16D; Singles – Doubles	(Israel) Anna Smashnova; 6–3, 6–3	(Belgium) Laurence Courtois	(Germany) Angelika Bachmann (Slovenia) Tina Pisnik	(Italy) Tathiana Garbin (Russia) Elena Makarova (Romania) Raluca Sandu (Russia) Elena Dementieva
7 Jun	Tashkent Open; Tashkent, Uzbekistan; Tier IV event Hard – $112,500 – 32S/32Q/16D; Singles – Doubles	(Russia) Evgenia Koulikovskaya (Austria) Patricia Wartusch; 7–6^{(7–3)}, 6–0	(Spain) Eva Bes-Ostáriz (Spain) Gisela Riera	(Germany) Angelika Bachmann (Slovenia) Tina Pisnik	(Italy) Tathiana Garbin (Russia) Elena Makarova (Romania) Raluca Sandu (Russia) Elena Dementieva
14 Jun	Direct Line Int'l Championships; Eastbourne, Great Britain; Tier II event Grass – $520,000 – 28S/32Q/16D; Singles – Doubles	(Belarus) Natasha Zvereva; 0–6, 7–5, 6–3	(France) Nathalie Tauziat	(South Africa) Amanda Coetzer (Russia) Anna Kournikova	(Luxembourg) Anne Kremer (South Africa) Mariaan de Swardt (Russia) Elena Likhovtseva (France) Nathalie Dechy
14 Jun	Direct Line Int'l Championships; Eastbourne, Great Britain; Tier II event Grass – $520,000 – 28S/32Q/16D; Singles – Doubles	(Switzerland) Martina Hingis (Russia) Anna Kournikova; 6–4 retired	(Czech Republic) Jana Novotná (Belarus) Natasha Zvereva	(South Africa) Amanda Coetzer (Russia) Anna Kournikova	(Luxembourg) Anne Kremer (South Africa) Mariaan de Swardt (Russia) Elena Likhovtseva (France) Nathalie Dechy
14 Jun	Heineken Trophy 's-Hertogenbosch, Netherlands; Tier III event Grass – $180,000 – 30S/32Q/16D; Singles – Doubles	(Puerto Rico) Kristina Brandi; 6–0, 3–6, 6–1	(Croatia) Silvija Talaja	(Netherlands) Miriam Oremans (Bulgaria) Magdalena Maleeva	(Switzerland) Emmanuelle Gagliardi (Netherlands) Kristie Boogert (Belgium) Laurence Courtois (Belgium) Dominique van Roost
14 Jun	Heineken Trophy 's-Hertogenbosch, Netherlands; Tier III event Grass – $180,000 – 30S/32Q/16D; Singles – Doubles	(Italy) Silvia Farina (Italy) Rita Grande; 7–5, 7–6^{(7–2)}	(Zimbabwe) Cara Black (Netherlands) Kristie Boogert	(Netherlands) Miriam Oremans (Bulgaria) Magdalena Maleeva	(Switzerland) Emmanuelle Gagliardi (Netherlands) Kristie Boogert (Belgium) Laurence Courtois (Belgium) Dominique van Roost
21 Jun; 28 Jun	Wimbledon Championships; London, Great Britain; Grand Slam; Grass – $4,732,303 – 128S/96Q/64D/32X; Singles – Doubles – Mixed doubles	(United States) Lindsay Davenport; 6–4, 7–5	(Germany) Steffi Graf	(United States) Alexandra Stevenson (Croatia) Mirjana Lučić	(Australia) Jelena Dokić (Czech Republic) Jana Novotná (France) Nathalie Tauziat (United States) Venus Williams
21 Jun; 28 Jun	Wimbledon Championships; London, Great Britain; Grand Slam; Grass – $4,732,303 – 128S/96Q/64D/32X; Singles – Doubles – Mixed doubles	(United States) Lindsay Davenport (United States) Corina Morariu; 6–4, 6–4	(South Africa) Mariaan de Swardt (Ukraine) Elena Tatarkova	(United States) Alexandra Stevenson (Croatia) Mirjana Lučić	(Australia) Jelena Dokić (Czech Republic) Jana Novotná (France) Nathalie Tauziat (United States) Venus Williams
21 Jun; 28 Jun	Wimbledon Championships; London, Great Britain; Grand Slam; Grass – $4,732,303 – 128S/96Q/64D/32X; Singles – Doubles – Mixed doubles	(India) Leander Paes (United States) Lisa Raymond; 6–4, 3–6, 6–3	(Sweden) Jonas Björkman (Russia) Anna Kournikova	(United States) Alexandra Stevenson (Croatia) Mirjana Lučić	(Australia) Jelena Dokić (Czech Republic) Jana Novotná (France) Nathalie Tauziat (United States) Venus Williams

=== July ===
Week	Tournament	Champions	Runners-up	Semifinalists	Quarterfinalists
5 Jul	Egger Tennis Festival; Pörtschach, Austria; Tier IV event Clay – $112,500 – 32S/32Q/16D; Singles – Doubles	(Slovakia) Karina Habšudová; 2–6, 6–4, 6–4	(Croatia) Silvija Talaja	(Slovakia) Henrieta Nagyová (Czech Republic) Adriana Gerši	(Germany) Anke Huber (Switzerland) Emmanuelle Gagliardi (Hungary) Anna Földényi (Italy) Silvia Farina
5 Jul	Egger Tennis Festival; Pörtschach, Austria; Tier IV event Clay – $112,500 – 32S/32Q/16D; Singles – Doubles	(Italy) Silvia Farina (Slovakia) Karina Habšudová; 6–4, 6–4	(Ukraine) Olga Lugina (Argentina) Laura Montalvo	(Slovakia) Henrieta Nagyová (Czech Republic) Adriana Gerši	(Germany) Anke Huber (Switzerland) Emmanuelle Gagliardi (Hungary) Anna Földényi (Italy) Silvia Farina
12 Jul	Prokom Polish Open; Sopot, Poland; Tier III event Clay – $180,000 – 30S/32Q/16D; Singles – Doubles	(Spain) Conchita Martínez; 6–1, 6–1	(Slovakia) Karina Habšudová	(Croatia) Silvija Talaja (France) Sandrine Testud	(Germany) Marlene Weingärtner (Spain) Cristina Torrens Valero (Spain) Gala León García (Slovakia) Ľudmila Cervanová
12 Jul	Prokom Polish Open; Sopot, Poland; Tier III event Clay – $180,000 – 30S/32Q/16D; Singles – Doubles	(Argentina) Laura Montalvo (Argentina) Paola Suárez; 6–4, 6–3	(Spain) Gala León García (Spain) María Sánchez Lorenzo	(Croatia) Silvija Talaja (France) Sandrine Testud	(Germany) Marlene Weingärtner (Spain) Cristina Torrens Valero (Spain) Gala León García (Slovakia) Ľudmila Cervanová
12 Jul	Torneo Internazionale; Palermo, Italy; Tier IV event Clay – $142,500 – 32S/32Q/16D; Singles – Doubles	(Russia) Anastasia Myskina; 3–6, 7–6^{(7–3)}, 6–2	(Spain) Ángeles Montolio	(Russia) Elena Dementieva (Slovenia) Katarina Srebotnik	(France) Sarah Pitkowski (Hungary) Rita Kuti-Kis (Italy) Giulia Casoni (Belgium) Laurence Courtois
12 Jul	Torneo Internazionale; Palermo, Italy; Tier IV event Clay – $142,500 – 32S/32Q/16D; Singles – Doubles	(Slovenia) Tina Križan (Slovenia) Katarina Srebotnik; 4–6, 6–3, 6–0	(Sweden) Åsa Carlsson (Canada) Sonya Jeyaseelan	(Russia) Elena Dementieva (Slovenia) Katarina Srebotnik	(France) Sarah Pitkowski (Hungary) Rita Kuti-Kis (Italy) Giulia Casoni (Belgium) Laurence Courtois
19 Jul	Fed Cup: Semifinals; Ancona, Italy – clay Moscow, Russia – clay (i)	Semifinals Winners; United States 4–1; Russia 3–2	Semifinals Losers; Italy; Slovakia		
26 July	Bank of the West Classic; Stanford, United States; Tier II event Hard – $520,000 – 28S/32Q/16D; Singles – Doubles	(United States) Lindsay Davenport; 7–6^{(7–1)}, 6–2	(United States) Venus Williams	(United States) Amy Frazier (South Africa) Amanda Coetzer	(United States) Corina Morariu (Luxembourg) Anne Kremer (France) Sandrine Testud (Russia) Anna Kournikova
26 July	Bank of the West Classic; Stanford, United States; Tier II event Hard – $520,000 – 28S/32Q/16D; Singles – Doubles	(United States) Lindsay Davenport (United States) Corina Morariu; 6–4, 6–4	(Russia) Anna Kournikova (Russia) Elena Likhovtseva	(United States) Amy Frazier (South Africa) Amanda Coetzer	(United States) Corina Morariu (Luxembourg) Anne Kremer (France) Sandrine Testud (Russia) Anna Kournikova

=== August ===
Week	Tournament	Champions	Runners-up	Semifinalists	Quarterfinalists
2 Aug	TIG Tennis Classic; San Diego, United States; Tier II event Hard – $520,000 – 28S/32Q/16D; Singles – Doubles	(Switzerland) Martina Hingis; 6–4, 6–0	(United States) Venus Williams	(United States) Lindsay Davenport (South Africa) Amanda Coetzer	(Germany) Anke Huber (France) Sandrine Testud (United States) Amy Frazier (Belgium) Dominique van Roost
2 Aug	TIG Tennis Classic; San Diego, United States; Tier II event Hard – $520,000 – 28S/32Q/16D; Singles – Doubles	(United States) Lindsay Davenport (United States) Corina Morariu; 6–4, 6–1	(United States) Serena Williams (United States) Venus Williams	(United States) Lindsay Davenport (South Africa) Amanda Coetzer	(Germany) Anke Huber (France) Sandrine Testud (United States) Amy Frazier (Belgium) Dominique van Roost
2 Aug	Sanex Trophy; Knokke-Heist, Belgium; Tier IV event Clay – $112,500 – 32S/32Q/16D; Singles – Doubles	(Spain) María Sánchez Lorenzo; 6–7^{(7–9)}, 6–4, 6–2	(Czech Republic) Denisa Chládková	(Germany) Barbara Rittner (Croatia) Silvija Talaja	(Belgium) Sabine Appelmans (Spain) Marta Marrero (Slovakia) Karina Habšudová (Spain) Mariam Ramón Climent
2 Aug	Sanex Trophy; Knokke-Heist, Belgium; Tier IV event Clay – $112,500 – 32S/32Q/16D; Singles – Doubles	(Czech Republic) Eva Martincová (Germany) Elena Wagner; 3–6, 6–3, 6–3	(Russia) Evgenia Koulikovskaya (Federal Republic of Yugoslavia) Sandra Naćuk	(Germany) Barbara Rittner (Croatia) Silvija Talaja	(Belgium) Sabine Appelmans (Spain) Marta Marrero (Slovakia) Karina Habšudová (Spain) Mariam Ramón Climent
9 Aug	Acura Classic; Manhattan Beach, United States; Tier II event Hard – $520,000 – 28S/32Q/16D; Singles – Doubles	(United States) Serena Williams; 6–1, 6–4	(France) Julie Halard-Decugis	(United States) Lindsay Davenport (Switzerland) Martina Hingis	(Spain) Conchita Martínez (France) Mary Pierce (Spain) Arantxa Sánchez Vicario (Austria) Barbara Schett
9 Aug	Acura Classic; Manhattan Beach, United States; Tier II event Hard – $520,000 – 28S/32Q/16D; Singles – Doubles	(Spain) Arantxa Sánchez Vicario (Latvia) Larisa Neiland; 6–2, 6–7^{(5–7)}, 6–0	(United States) Lisa Raymond (Australia) Rennae Stubbs	(United States) Lindsay Davenport (Switzerland) Martina Hingis	(Spain) Conchita Martínez (France) Mary Pierce (Spain) Arantxa Sánchez Vicario (Austria) Barbara Schett
16 Aug	du Maurier Open; Toronto, Canada; Tier I event Hard – $1,050,000 – 56S/32Q/28D; Singles – Doubles	(Switzerland) Martina Hingis; 6–4, 6–4	(United States) Monica Seles	(France) Mary Pierce (France) Anne-Gaëlle Sidot	(Spain) Arantxa Sánchez Vicario (France) Sandrine Testud (South Africa) Amanda Coetzer (Austria) Barbara Schett
16 Aug	du Maurier Open; Toronto, Canada; Tier I event Hard – $1,050,000 – 56S/32Q/28D; Singles – Doubles	(Czech Republic) Jana Novotná (France) Mary Pierce; 6–3, 2–6, 6–3	(Spain) Arantxa Sánchez Vicario (Latvia) Larisa Neiland	(France) Mary Pierce (France) Anne-Gaëlle Sidot	(Spain) Arantxa Sánchez Vicario (France) Sandrine Testud (South Africa) Amanda Coetzer (Austria) Barbara Schett
23 Aug	Pilot Pen Tennis; New Haven, United States; Tier II event Hard – $520,000 – 28S/32Q/16D; Singles – Doubles	(United States) Venus Williams; 6–2, 7–5	(United States) Lindsay Davenport	(Romania) Ruxandra Dragomir (United States) Monica Seles	(France) Amélie Mauresmo (France) Sandrine Testud (South Africa) Amanda Coetzer (Spain) Magüi Serna
23 Aug	Pilot Pen Tennis; New Haven, United States; Tier II event Hard – $520,000 – 28S/32Q/16D; Singles – Doubles	(United States) Lisa Raymond (Australia) Rennae Stubbs; 7–6^{(7–1)}, 6–2	(Russia) Elena Likhovtseva (Czech Republic) Jana Novotná	(Romania) Ruxandra Dragomir (United States) Monica Seles	(France) Amélie Mauresmo (France) Sandrine Testud (South Africa) Amanda Coetzer (Spain) Magüi Serna
30 Aug; 6 Sep	US Open; New York City, United States; Grand Slam; Hard – $6,235,000 – 128S/96Q/64D/32X; Singles – Doubles – Mixed doubles	(United States) Serena Williams; 6–3, 7–6^{(7–4)}	(Switzerland) Martina Hingis	(United States) Venus Williams (United States) Lindsay Davenport	(Germany) Anke Huber (Austria) Barbara Schett (United States) Monica Seles (France) Mary Pierce
30 Aug; 6 Sep	US Open; New York City, United States; Grand Slam; Hard – $6,235,000 – 128S/96Q/64D/32X; Singles – Doubles – Mixed doubles	(United States) Serena Williams (United States) Venus Williams; 4–6, 6–1, 6–4	(United States) Chanda Rubin (France) Sandrine Testud	(United States) Venus Williams (United States) Lindsay Davenport	(Germany) Anke Huber (Austria) Barbara Schett (United States) Monica Seles (France) Mary Pierce
30 Aug; 6 Sep	US Open; New York City, United States; Grand Slam; Hard – $6,235,000 – 128S/96Q/64D/32X; Singles – Doubles – Mixed doubles	(India) Mahesh Bhupathi (Japan) Ai Sugiyama; 6–4, 6–4	(United States) Donald Johnson (United States) Kimberly Po	(United States) Venus Williams (United States) Lindsay Davenport	(Germany) Anke Huber (Austria) Barbara Schett (United States) Monica Seles (France) Mary Pierce

=== September ===
Week	Tournament	Champions	Runners-up	Semifinalists	Quarterfinalists
13 Sep	Fed Cup: Final; Stanford, United States – hard	United States; 4–1	Russia		
20 Sep	Toyota Princess Cup; Tokyo, Japan; Tier II event Hard – $520,000 – 28S/32Q/16D; Singles – Doubles	(United States) Lindsay Davenport; 7–5, 7–6^{(7–1)}	(United States) Monica Seles	(United States) Amy Frazier (Japan) Ai Sugiyama	(France) Amélie Mauresmo (South Africa) Amanda Coetzer (France) Julie Halard-Decugis (Spain) Conchita Martínez
20 Sep	Toyota Princess Cup; Tokyo, Japan; Tier II event Hard – $520,000 – 28S/32Q/16D; Singles – Doubles	(Spain) Conchita Martínez (Argentina) Patricia Tarabini; 6–7^{(7–9)}, 6–4, 6–2	(South Africa) Amanda Coetzer (Australia) Jelena Dokić	(United States) Amy Frazier (Japan) Ai Sugiyama	(France) Amélie Mauresmo (South Africa) Amanda Coetzer (France) Julie Halard-Decugis (Spain) Conchita Martínez
20 Sep	SEAT Open Luxembourg; Kockelscheuer, Luxembourg; Tier III event Hard (i) – $180,000 – 30S/32Q/16D; Singles – Doubles	(Belgium) Kim Clijsters; 6–2, 6–2	(Belgium) Dominique van Roost	(Belgium) Sabine Appelmans (Russia) Lina Krasnoroutskaya	(Belgium) Els Callens (Belgium) Justine Henin (Italy) Silvia Farina Elia (Slovenia) Tina Pisnik
20 Sep	SEAT Open Luxembourg; Kockelscheuer, Luxembourg; Tier III event Hard (i) – $180,000 – 30S/32Q/16D; Singles – Doubles	(Romania) Irina Spîrlea (Netherlands) Caroline Vis; 6–1, 6–2	(Slovenia) Tina Križan (Slovenia) Katarina Srebotnik	(Belgium) Sabine Appelmans (Russia) Lina Krasnoroutskaya	(Belgium) Els Callens (Belgium) Justine Henin (Italy) Silvia Farina Elia (Slovenia) Tina Pisnik
27 Sep	Compaq Grand Slam Cup; Munich, Germany; Exhibition event Hard – $2,450,000 – 8S; Singles	(United States) Serena Williams; 6–1, 3–6, 6–3	(United States) Venus Williams	(Switzerland) Martina Hingis (United States) Lindsay Davenport	(France) Amélie Mauresmo (Austria) Barbara Schett (Spain) Arantxa Sánchez Vicario (France) Mary Pierce

=== October ===
Week	Tournament	Champions	Runners-up	Semifinalists	Quarterfinalists
4 Oct	Porsche Tennis Grand Prix; Filderstadt, Germany; Tier II event Hard (i) – $520,000 – 28S/32Q/16D; Singles – Doubles	(Switzerland) Martina Hingis; 6–4, 6–1	(France) Mary Pierce	(France) Sandrine Testud (Germany) Anke Huber	(France) Nathalie Dechy (Belgium) Sabine Appelmans (Austria) Barbara Schett (United States) Lindsay Davenport
4 Oct	Porsche Tennis Grand Prix; Filderstadt, Germany; Tier II event Hard (i) – $520,000 – 28S/32Q/16D; Singles – Doubles	(United States) Chanda Rubin (France) Sandrine Testud; 6–3, 6–4	(Spain) Arantxa Sánchez Vicario (Latvia) Larisa Neiland	(France) Sandrine Testud (Germany) Anke Huber	(France) Nathalie Dechy (Belgium) Sabine Appelmans (Austria) Barbara Schett (United States) Lindsay Davenport
4 Oct	Brasil Open; São Paulo, Brazil; Tier IV event Clay – $142,500 – 32S/32Q/16D; Singles – Doubles	(Colombia) Fabiola Zuluaga; 7–5, 4–6, 7–5	(Austria) Patricia Wartusch	(Spain) Gala León García (Spain) Cristina Torrens Valero	(Spain) Gisela Riera (Hungary) Rita Kuti-Kis (Italy) Antonella Serra Zanetti (Hungary) Petra Mandula
4 Oct	Brasil Open; São Paulo, Brazil; Tier IV event Clay – $142,500 – 32S/32Q/16D; Singles – Doubles	(Argentina) Laura Montalvo (Argentina) Paola Suárez; 6–7^{(7–9)}, 7–5, 7–5	(Slovakia) Janette Husárová (Argentina) Florencia Labat	(Spain) Gala León García (Spain) Cristina Torrens Valero	(Spain) Gisela Riera (Hungary) Rita Kuti-Kis (Italy) Antonella Serra Zanetti (Hungary) Petra Mandula
11 Oct	Swisscom Challenge; Zürich, Switzerland; Tier I event Hard (i) – $1,050,000 – 28S/32Q/16D; Singles – Doubles	(United States) Venus Williams; 6–3, 6–4	(Switzerland) Martina Hingis	(France) Nathalie Tauziat (France) Mary Pierce	(United States) Corina Morariu (South Africa) Amanda Coetzer (Belgium) Dominique van Roost (France) Julie Halard-Decugis
11 Oct	Swisscom Challenge; Zürich, Switzerland; Tier I event Hard (i) – $1,050,000 – 28S/32Q/16D; Singles – Doubles	(United States) Lisa Raymond (Australia) Rennae Stubbs; 6–2, 6–2	(France) Nathalie Tauziat (Belarus) Natasha Zvereva	(France) Nathalie Tauziat (France) Mary Pierce	(United States) Corina Morariu (South Africa) Amanda Coetzer (Belgium) Dominique van Roost (France) Julie Halard-Decugis
18 Oct	Kremlin Cup; Moscow, Russia; Tier I event Carpet (i) – $1,050,000 – 28S/32Q/16D; Singles – Doubles	(France) Nathalie Tauziat; 2–6, 6–4, 6–1	(Austria) Barbara Schett	(United States) Lisa Raymond (Belgium) Dominique van Roost	(Japan) Ai Sugiyama (Germany) Anke Huber (France) Julie Halard-Decugis (Italy) Silvia Farina Elia
18 Oct	Kremlin Cup; Moscow, Russia; Tier I event Carpet (i) – $1,050,000 – 28S/32Q/16D; Singles – Doubles	(United States) Lisa Raymond (Australia) Rennae Stubbs; 6–1, 6–0	(France) Julie Halard-Decugis (Germany) Anke Huber	(United States) Lisa Raymond (Belgium) Dominique van Roost	(Japan) Ai Sugiyama (Germany) Anke Huber (France) Julie Halard-Decugis (Italy) Silvia Farina Elia
18 Oct	Eurotel Slovak Open; Bratislava, Slovakia; Tier IV event Hard (i) – $112,500 – 32S/32Q/16D; Singles – Doubles	(France) Amélie Mauresmo; 6–3, 6–3	(Belgium) Kim Clijsters	(Czech Republic) Květa Hrdličková (France) Nathalie Dechy	(Austria) Barbara Schwartz (Slovakia) Karina Habšudová (Belgium) Sabine Appelmans (Belarus) Olga Barabanschikova
18 Oct	Eurotel Slovak Open; Bratislava, Slovakia; Tier IV event Hard (i) – $112,500 – 32S/32Q/16D; Singles – Doubles	(Belgium) Kim Clijsters (Belgium) Laurence Courtois; 6–2, 3–6, 7–5	(Belarus) Olga Barabanschikova (United States) Lilia Osterloh	(Czech Republic) Květa Hrdličková (France) Nathalie Dechy	(Austria) Barbara Schwartz (Slovakia) Karina Habšudová (Belgium) Sabine Appelmans (Belarus) Olga Barabanschikova
25 Oct	Generali Ladies Linz; Linz, Austria; Tier II event Hard (i) – $520,000 – 28S/32Q/16D; Singles – Doubles	(France) Mary Pierce; 7–6^{(7–2)}, 6–1	(France) Sandrine Testud	(France) Amélie Mauresmo (France) Sarah Pitkowski	(Romania) Irina Spîrlea (Austria) Barbara Schwartz (France) Nathalie Tauziat (Czech Republic) Denisa Chládková
25 Oct	Generali Ladies Linz; Linz, Austria; Tier II event Hard (i) – $520,000 – 28S/32Q/16D; Singles – Doubles	(Romania) Irina Spîrlea (Netherlands) Caroline Vis; 6–4, 6–3	(Slovenia) Tina Križan (Latvia) Larisa Neiland	(France) Amélie Mauresmo (France) Sarah Pitkowski	(Romania) Irina Spîrlea (Austria) Barbara Schwartz (France) Nathalie Tauziat (Czech Republic) Denisa Chládková

=== November ===
Week	Tournament	Champions	Runners-up	Semifinalists	Quarterfinalists
1 Nov	Sparkassen Cup Int'l; Leipzig, Germany; Tier II event Hard (i) – $520,000 – 28S/32Q/16D; Singles – Doubles	(France) Nathalie Tauziat; 6–1, 6–3	(Czech Republic) Květa Hrdličková	(France) Mary Pierce (Germany) Anke Huber	(Spain) Conchita Martínez (Belgium) Sabine Appelmans (France) Anne-Gaëlle Sidot (Russia) Anna Kournikova
1 Nov	Sparkassen Cup Int'l; Leipzig, Germany; Tier II event Hard (i) – $520,000 – 28S/32Q/16D; Singles – Doubles	(France) Mary Pierce (Latvia) Larisa Neiland; 6–4, 6–3	(Russia) Elena Likhovtseva (Japan) Ai Sugiyama	(France) Mary Pierce (Germany) Anke Huber	(Spain) Conchita Martínez (Belgium) Sabine Appelmans (France) Anne-Gaëlle Sidot (Russia) Anna Kournikova
1 Nov	Bell Challenge; Quebec City, Canada; Tier III event Carpet (i) – $180,000 – 30S/32Q/16D; Singles – Doubles	(United States) Jennifer Capriati; 4–6, 6–1, 6–2	(United States) Chanda Rubin	(United States) Tara Snyder (United States) Amy Frazier	(Zimbabwe) Cara Black (United States) Mashona Washington (United States) Lisa Raymond (Belgium) Justine Henin
1 Nov	Bell Challenge; Quebec City, Canada; Tier III event Carpet (i) – $180,000 – 30S/32Q/16D; Singles – Doubles	(United States) Amy Frazier (United States) Katie Schlukebir; 6–2, 6–3	(Zimbabwe) Cara Black (United States) Debbie Graham	(United States) Tara Snyder (United States) Amy Frazier	(Zimbabwe) Cara Black (United States) Mashona Washington (United States) Lisa Raymond (Belgium) Justine Henin
8 Nov	Advanta Championships; Philadelphia, United States; Tier II event Hard (i) – $520,000 – 28S/32Q/16D; Singles – Doubles	(United States) Lindsay Davenport; 6–3, 6–4	(Switzerland) Martina Hingis	(France) Nathalie Tauziat (United States) Venus Williams	(United States) Amy Frazier (United States) Lisa Raymond (France) Sandrine Testud (France) Julie Halard-Decugis
8 Nov	Advanta Championships; Philadelphia, United States; Tier II event Hard (i) – $520,000 – 28S/32Q/16D; Singles – Doubles	(United States) Lisa Raymond (Australia) Rennae Stubbs; 6–1, 7–6^{(7–2)}	(United States) Chanda Rubin (France) Sandrine Testud	(France) Nathalie Tauziat (United States) Venus Williams	(United States) Amy Frazier (United States) Lisa Raymond (France) Sandrine Testud (France) Julie Halard-Decugis
8 Nov	Wismilak International; Kuala Lumpur, Malaysia; Tier III event Hard – $180,000 – 30S/32Q/16D; Singles – Doubles	(Sweden) Åsa Carlsson; 6–2, 6–4	(United States) Erika deLone	(South Africa) Joannette Kruger (Italy) Rita Grande	(Russia) Anastasia Myskina (United States) Kristina Brandi (France) Amélie Cocheteux (Thailand) Tamarine Tanasugarn
8 Nov	Wismilak International; Kuala Lumpur, Malaysia; Tier III event Hard – $180,000 – 30S/32Q/16D; Singles – Doubles	(Croatia) Jelena Kostanić (Slovenia) Tina Pisnik; 3–6, 6–2, 6–4	(Japan) Rika Hiraki (Japan) Yuka Yoshida	(South Africa) Joannette Kruger (Italy) Rita Grande	(Russia) Anastasia Myskina (United States) Kristina Brandi (France) Amélie Cocheteux (Thailand) Tamarine Tanasugarn
15 Nov	WTA Tour Championships; New York City, United States; Year-end Championship; Hard – $2,000,000 – 16S/8D; Singles – Doubles	(United States) Lindsay Davenport; 6–4, 6–2	(Switzerland) Martina Hingis	(United States) Venus Williams (France) Nathalie Tauziat	(France) Mary Pierce (Austria) Barbara Schett (Belgium) Dominique van Roost (Germany) Anke Huber
15 Nov	WTA Tour Championships; New York City, United States; Year-end Championship; Hard – $2,000,000 – 16S/8D; Singles – Doubles	(Switzerland) Martina Hingis (Russia) Anna Kournikova; 6–4, 6–4	(Spain) Arantxa Sánchez Vicario (Latvia) Larisa Neiland	(United States) Venus Williams (France) Nathalie Tauziat	(France) Mary Pierce (Austria) Barbara Schett (Belgium) Dominique van Roost (Germany) Anke Huber
15 Nov	Pattaya Women's Open; Pattaya, Thailand; Tier IV event Hard – $112,500 – 32S/32Q/16D; Singles – Doubles	(Bulgaria) Magdalena Maleeva; 4–6, 6–1, 6–2	(Luxembourg) Anne Kremer	(Croatia) Silvija Talaja (Czech Republic) Denisa Chládková	(Australia) Nicole Pratt (Sweden) Åsa Carlsson (South Africa) Joannette Kruger (Italy) Rita Grande
15 Nov	Pattaya Women's Open; Pattaya, Thailand; Tier IV event Hard – $112,500 – 32S/32Q/16D; Singles – Doubles	(France) Émilie Loit (Sweden) Åsa Carlsson; 6–1, 6–4	(Russia) Evgenia Koulikovskaya (Austria) Patricia Wartusch	(Croatia) Silvija Talaja (Czech Republic) Denisa Chládková	(Australia) Nicole Pratt (Sweden) Åsa Carlsson (South Africa) Joannette Kruger (Italy) Rita Grande

== Rankings ==
The Race to the Championships determines the players in the WTA Tour Championships in November. The WTA rankings are based on tournaments of the latest 52 weeks.

=== Singles ===
The following is the 1999 top 25 ranked players in the world.

WTA Singles Year-End Rankings
#	Player	Points	Change
1	Martina Hingis (SUI)	6,074	▲1
2	Lindsay Davenport (USA)	4,841	▼1
3	Venus Williams (USA)	4,378	▲2
4	Serena Williams (USA)	3,021	▲16
5	Mary Pierce (FRA)	2,658	▲2
6	Monica Seles (USA)	2,310	Steady
7	Nathalie Tauziat (FRA)	2,213	▲3
8	Barbara Schett (AUT)	2,188	▲15
9	Julie Halard-Decugis (FRA)	1,977	▲13
10	Amélie Mauresmo (FRA)	1,906	▲19
11	Amanda Coetzer (RSA)	1,846	▲6
12	Anna Kournikova (RUS)	1,641	▲1
13	Sandrine Testud (FRA)	1,635	▲1
14	Dominique Van Roost (BEL)	1,621	▼2
15	Conchita Martínez (ESP)	1,564	▼7
16	Anke Huber (GER)	1,548	▲5
17	Arantxa Sánchez Vicario (ESP)	1,435	▼13
18	Elena Likhovtseva (RUS)	1,393	▲8
19	Amy Frazier (USA)	1,299	▲23
20	Ruxandra Dragomir (ROU)	1,291	▲18
21	Patty Schnyder (SUI)	1,189	▼10
22	Chanda Rubin (USA)	1,188	▲12
23	Jennifer Capriati (USA)	1,140	▲78
24	Ai Sugiyama (JPN)	1,122	▼6
25	Nathalie Dechy (FRA)	1,022	▲23

==== Number 1 ranking ====
Holder	Date gained	Date forfeited
Lindsay Davenport (USA)	Year-End 1998	7 February 1999
Martina Hingis (SUI)	8 February 1999	4 July 1999
Lindsay Davenport (USA)	5 July 1999	8 August 1999
Martina Hingis (SUI)	9 August 1999	Year-End 1999

=== Doubles ===
The following are the 1999 top 20 individual ranked doubles players.

WTA Doubles Year-End Rankings
#	Player	Points	Change
1	Anna Kournikova (RUS)	3,119	▲9
2	Martina Hingis (SUI)	3,106	Steady
3	Larisa Neiland (LAT)	2,997	▲8
4	Lindsay Davenport (USA)	2,959	Steady
5	Lisa Raymond (USA)	2,667	Steady
6	Corina Morariu (USA)	2,522	▲33
7	Rennae Stubbs (AUS)	2,522	▼2
8	Elena Likhovtseva (RUS)	2,359	▲1
9	Arantxa Sánchez Vicario (ESP)	2,319	▲3
10	Venus Williams (USA)	2,291	▲26
=	Serena Williams (USA)	2,291	▲26
12	Natasha Zvereva (BLR)	2,251	▼11
13	Alexandra Fusai (FRA)	2,128	▼5
14	Nathalie Tauziat (FRA)	2,059	▼7
15	Caroline Vis (NED)	1,845	Steady
16	Ai Sugiyama (JPN)	1,802	▼3
17	Irina Spîrlea (ROU)	1,762	▲16
18	Patricia Tarabini (ARG)	1,649	▼4
19	Elena Tatarkova (UKR)	1,605	▲3
20	Mary Pierce (FRA)	1,577	▲36

==== Number 1 ranking ====
Holder	Date gained	Date forfeited
Natasha Zvereva (BLR)	Year-End 1998	16 May 1999
Jana Novotná (CZE)	17 May 1999	6 June 1999
Martina Hingis (SUI)	7 June 1999	4 July 1999
Natasha Zvereva (BLR)	5 July 1999	1 August 1999
Martina Hingis (SUI)	2 August 1999	22 August 1999
Lindsay Davenport (USA)	23 August 1999	21 November 1999
Anna Kournikova (RUS)	22 November 1999	Year-End 1999

== See also ==
- 1999 ATP Tour
- List of female tennis players
- List of tennis tournaments
