= 1999 Westel 900 Budapest Open =

- Date: 19 – 25 April
- Edition: 4th
- Category: Tier IVa
- Draw: 32S / 16D
- Prize money: $142,500
- Surface: Clay / outdoor
- Location: Budapest, Hungary

Champions

Singles
- (France) Sarah Pitkowski

Doubles
- (Russia) Evgenia Kulikovskaya / (Federal Republic of Yugoslavia) Sandra Načuk
| ← 1998 · | Hungarian Ladies Open | · 2000 → |

The 1999 Westel 900 Budapest Open was a women's tennis tournament played on outdoor clay courts in Budapest in Hungary that was part of Tier IVa of the 1999 WTA Tour. It was the fourth edition of the tournament and was held from 19 April until 25 April 1999. Seventh-seeded Sarah Pitkowski won the singles title and earned $22,000 first-prize money.

== Finals ==
=== Singles ===
(France) Sarah Pitkowski defeated (Spain) Cristina Torrens Valero, 6–2, 6–2

- It was Pitkowski's only singles title of her career.

=== Doubles ===
(Russia) Evgenia Kulikovskaya / (Federal Republic of Yugoslavia) Sandra Načuk defeated (Argentina) Laura Montalvo / (Spain) Virginia Ruano Pascual, 6–3, 6–4

== Entrants ==
=== Seeds ===
| Country | Player | Rank | Seed |
|---|---|---|---|
| CZE | Jana Novotná | 4 | 1 |
| SVK | Henrieta Nagyová | 24 | 2 |
| ITA | Silvia Farina | 25 | 3 |
| ESP | Virginia Ruano Pascual | 28 | 4 |
| FRA | Nathalie Dechy | 30 | 5 |
| ESP | María Sánchez Lorenzo | 40 | 6 |
| FRA | Sarah Pitkowski | 41 | 7 |
| ESP | Gala León García | 49 | 8 |

=== Other entrants ===
The following players received wildcards into the doubles main draw:

- (Hungary) Zsófia Gubacsi / (Hungary) Petra Mandula

The following players received entry from the singles qualifying draw:

- (Poland) Katarzyna Straczy
- (Czech Republic) Eva Martincová
- (Hungary) Zsófia Gubacsi
- (Slovakia) Martina Suchá

The following player received entry as a lucky loser:

- (Austria) Sandra Dopfer
