= 1999 Westel 900 Budapest Open – Doubles =

Doubles
- 1999 Westel 900 Budapest Open

Final
- Champions: (Russia) Evgenia Kulikovskaya (Federal Republic of Yugoslavia) Sandra Naćuk
- Runners-up: (Argentina) Laura Montalvo (Spain) Virginia Ruano Pascual
- Score: 6–3, 6–4

Events
Singles	Doubles
← 1998 ·	Westel 900 Budapest Open	· 2000 →

The 1999 Westel 900 Budapest Open doubles was the doubles event of the second edition of the Budapest Grand Prix; a WTA Tier IV tournament and the most prestigious women's tennis tournament held in Hungary. Virginia Ruano Pascual and Paola Suárez were the defending champions but only Ruano Pascual competed that year with Laura Montalvo.

Montalvo and Ruano Pascual lost in the final 6–3, 6–4 against Evgenia Kulikovskaya and Sandra Naćuk.

== Seeds ==
The top two seeded teams received byes into the quarterfinals.

1. (Argentina) Laura Montalvo / (Spain) Virginia Ruano Pascual (final)
2. (Czech Republic) Eva Martincová / (Czech Republic) Eva Melicharová (quarterfinals)
3. (Spain) Gala León García / (Spain) Cristina Torrens Valero (first round)
4. (Germany) Jana Kandarr / (Germany) Elena Wagner (quarterfinals)

== Draw ==
=== Key ===
- Q = Qualifier
- WC = Wild card
- LL = Lucky loser
- Alt = Alternate
- SE = Special exempt
- PR = Protected ranking
- ITF = ITF entry
- JE = Junior exempt
- w/o = Walkover
- r = Retired
- d = Defaulted
- SR = Special ranking

First round

Quarterfinals

Semifinals

Final

1
- (Argentina) L Montalvo
- (Spain) V Ruano Pascual
6
7

- (Netherlands) A Hopmans
- (Slovakia) H Nagyová
3
3

- (Germany) J Abe
- (Austria) B Schwartz
2
5

- (Germany) J Abe
- (Austria) B Schwartz
6
6

1
- (Argentina) L Montalvo
- (Spain) V Ruano Pascual
6
6

3
- (Spain) G León García
- (Spain) C Torrens Valero
1
1

- (Czech Republic) R Pelikánová
- (Czech Republic) L Richterová
4
3

- (France) S Pitkowski
- (Slovakia) Váleková
6
6

- (France) S Pitkowski
- (Slovakia) Z Valeková
4
2

- (Czech Republic) R Pelikánová
- (Czech Republic) L Richterová
7
6

- (Czech Republic) R Pelikánová
- (Czech Republic) L Richterová
6
6

(Slovakia) Ľ Cervanová
(France) N Dechy
5
1

1
- (Argentina) L Montalvo
- (Spain) V Ruano Pascual
3
4

(Russia) E Kulikovskaya
(Federal Republic of Yugoslavia) S Naćuk
7^{7}
6

(Russia) E Kulikovskaya
(Federal Republic of Yugoslavia) S Naćuk
6
6

- (Hungary) A Hegedűs
- (Austria) M Maruska
6^{5}
4

(Russia) E Kulikovskaya
(Federal Republic of Yugoslavia) S Naćuk
6
6

- (Italy) Ad Serra Zanetti
- (Italy) An Serra Zanetti
5
6
2

4
- (Germany) J Kandarr
- (Germany) E Wagner
4
0

4
- (Germany) J Kandarr
- (Germany) E Wagner
7
1
6

(Russia) E Kulikovskaya
(Federal Republic of Yugoslavia) S Naćuk
7
6

- (Germany) A Barna
- (Hungary) A Földényi

WC
- (Hungary) Z Gubacsi
- (Hungary) P Mandula
6
3

WC
- (Hungary) Z Gubacsi
- (Hungary) P Mandula
w/o

WC
- (Hungary) Z Gubacsi
- (Hungary) P Mandula
6
6

2
- (Czech Republic) E Martincová
- (Czech Republic) E Melicharová
2
4
