= 1998 Budapest Lotto Open – Singles =

Singles
- 1998 Budapest Lotto Open

Final
- Champion: (Spain) Virginia Ruano Pascual
- Runner-up: (Italy) Silvia Farina
- Score: 6–4, 4–6, 6–3

Details
- Draw: 32
- Seeds: 8

Events
Singles	Doubles
← 1997 ·	Budapest Lotto Open	· 1999 →

Amanda Coetzer was the defending champion but did not compete that year.

Seventh-seeded Virginia Ruano Pascual won in the final 6–4, 4–6, 6–3 against Silvia Farina.

== Seeds ==
A champion seed is indicated in bold text while text in italics indicates the round in which that seed was eliminated.

1. (France) Sandrine Testud (quarterfinals)
2. (Belgium) Dominique Van Roost (first round)
3. (Italy) Silvia Farina (final)
4. (France) Anne-Gaëlle Sidot (first round)
5. (France) Sarah Pitkowski (semifinals)
6. (China) Fang Li (semifinals)
7. (Spain) **Virginia Ruano Pascual (champion)**
8. (Spain) María Sánchez Lorenzo (quarterfinals)

== Draw ==
=== Key ===
- Q = Qualifier
- WC = Wild card
- LL = Lucky loser
- Alt = Alternate
- SE = Special exempt
- PR = Protected ranking
- ITF = ITF entry
- JE = Junior exempt
- w/o = Walkover
- r = Retired
- d = Defaulted
- SR = Special ranking

First round
1	(France) **S Testud**	**6**	**6**
(Austria) M Maruska	3	4
Q	(Spain) **E Bes Ostariz**	**6**	**6**
(Slovakia) J Husárová	3	3
(Italy) **L Golarsa**	0	**6**	**7**
(Italy) S Cecchini	**6**	2	5
(Germany) W Probst	1	0
5	(China) **F Li**	**6**	**6**
3	(Italy) **S Farina**	**7**	**6**
LL	(Bulgaria) S Krivencheva	6	3
(Spain) **C Torrens Valero**	**6**	**6**
(Argentina) P Suárez	3	2
(France) A D-Balleret	2	4
(France) **L Ghirardi**	**6**	**6**
Q	(Romania) R Sandu	4	**6**	4
8	(Spain) **M Sánchez Lorenzo**	**6**	4	**6**
5	(France) **S Pitkowski**	**6**	**6**
WC	(Hungary) Z Gubacsi	3	4
(Slovakia) K Studeníková	**6**	3	3
(Russia) **E Makarova**	4	**6**	**6**
(France) N Dechy	3	4
WC	(France) **J Halard-Decugis**	**6**	**6**
(Spain) **G León García**	**6**	**6**
4	(France) A-G Sidot	2	1
7	(Spain) **V Ruano Pascual**	2	**6**	**6**
LL	(Federal Republic of Yugoslavia) S Načuk	**6**	1	2
Q	(Italy) T Garbin	4	**6**	1
(Italy) **F Lubiani**	**6**	2	**6**
(Switzerland) E Gagliardi	3	5
(Hungary) **R Kuti-Kis**	**6**	**7**
(Romania) **C Cristea**	**6**	**6**
2	(Belgium) D Van Roost	4	0

Second round
1	(France) **S Testud**	**7**	**7**
Q	(Spain) E Bes Ostariz	6	6
(Italy) L Golarsa	2	4
6	(China) **F Li**	**6**	**6**
3	(Italy) **S Farina**	**6**	**6**
(Spain) C Torrens Valero	2	2
(France) L Ghirardi	4	**6**	3
8	(Spain) **M Sánchez Lorenzo**	**6**	4	**6**
5	(France) **S Pitkowski**	2	**7**	**6**
(Russia) E Makarova	**6**	5	3
WC	(France) **J Halard-Decugis**	**6**	**6**
(Spain) G León García	3	0
7	(Spain) **V Ruano Pascual**	**6**	4	**7**
(Italy) F Lubiani	0	**6**	6
(Hungary) **R Kuti-Kis**	**6**	**6**
(Romania) C Cristea	3	2

Quarterfinals
1	(France) S Testud	**7**	6	4
6	(China) **F Li**	5	**7**	**6**
3	(Italy) **S Farina**	**6**	**6**
8	(Spain) M Sánchez Lorenzo	1	2
5	(France) **S Pitkowski**	5	**6**	**6**
WC	(France) J Halard-Decugis	**7**	3	2
7	(Spain) **V Ruano Pascual**	**6**	**6**
(Hungary) R Kuti-Kis	3	0

Semifinals
6	(China) F Li	**6**	2	3
3	(Italy) **S Farina**	4	**6**	**6**
5	(France) S Pitkowski	**6**	1	5
7	(Spain) **V Ruano Pascual**	2	**6**	**7**

Final
3	(Italy) Silvia Farina	4	**6**	3
7	(Spain) **V Ruano Pascual**	**6**	4	**6**
