= 2000 Westel 900 Budapest Open =

- Date: 17–23 April
- Edition: 5th
- Category: Tier IVb
- Draw: 32S / 16D
- Prize money: $110,000
- Surface: Clay / outdoor
- Location: Budapest, Hungary

Champions

Singles
- (Italy) Tathiana Garbin

Doubles
- (Bulgaria) Lubomira Bacheva / (Spain) Cristina Torrens Valero
← 1999 ·	Hungarian Ladies Open	· 2001 →

The 2000 Westel 900 Budapest Open was a women's tennis tournament played on outdoor clay courts in Budapest in Hungary that was part of the Tier IVb category of the 2000 WTA Tour. It was the fifth edition of the tournament and was held from 17 April until 23 April 2000. Unseeded Tathiana Garbin won the singles title and earned $16,000 first-prize money.

== Finals ==
=== Singles ===
(Italy) Tathiana Garbin defeated (Netherlands) Kristie Boogert, 6–2, 7–6^{(7–4)}

- It was Garbin's only singles title of her career.

=== Doubles ===
(Bulgaria) Lubomira Bacheva / (Spain) Cristina Torrens Valero defeated (Croatia) Jelena Kostanić / (Federal Republic of Yugoslavia) Sandra Načuk, 6–0, 6–2
