= 2000 Westel 900 Budapest Open – Singles =

Singles
- 2000 Westel 900 Budapest Open

Final
- Champion: (Italy) Tathiana Garbin
- Runner-up: (Netherlands) Kristie Boogert
- Score: 6–2, 7–6^{(7–4)}

Details
- Draw: 32 (2WC/4Q)
- Seeds: 8

Events
Singles	Doubles
← 1999 ·	Hungarian Ladies Open	· 2001 →

Sarah Pitkowski was the defending champion, but lost in the semifinals to Tathiana Garbin.

Garbin won the title by defeating Kristie Boogert 6–2, 7–6^{(7–4)} in the final.

== Seeds ==
1. (Austria) Sylvia Plischke (second round)
2. (France) Sarah Pitkowski (semifinals, retired)
3. (Slovenia) Karina Habšudová (second round, retired)
4. (Spain) Ángeles Montolio (semifinals)
5. (Spain) Cristina Torrens Valero (first round)
6. (Czech Republic) Adriana Gerši (second round)
7. (Netherlands) Kristie Boogert (final)
8. (Austria) Patricia Wartusch (first round)

== Draw ==
=== Key ===
- Q = Qualifier
- WC = Wild card
- LL = Lucky loser
- Alt = Alternate
- SE = Special exempt
- PR = Protected ranking
- ITF = ITF entry
- JE = Junior exempt
- w/o = Walkover
- r = Retired
- d = Defaulted
- SR = Special ranking

=== Finals ===
Semifinals
7	(Netherlands) Kristie Boogert	6	6
4	(Spain) Ángeles Montolio	4	2
(Italy) Tathiana Garbin	6	3
2	(France) Sarah Pitkowski	3	0^{r}

Final
7	(Netherlands) Kristie Boogert	2	6^{4}
(Italy) Tathiana Garbin	6	7^{7}

=== Top half ===
First round
1	(Austria) S Plischke	6	6
(Belgium) E Callens	4	3
(Bulgaria) L Bacheva	2	6	2
Q	(Hungary) K Marosi	6	4	6
(Argentina) M Díaz Oliva	3	6^{5}
Q	(Russia) L Krasnoroutskaya	6	7^{7}
WC	(Hungary) Z Gubacsi	5	0
7	(Netherlands) K Boogert	7	6
4	(Spain) Á Montolio	1	6	6
(Slovenia) K Srebotnik	6	2	4
Q	(Germany) E Wagner	7^{7}	6
(Netherlands) M Oremans	6^{3}	4
WC	(Hungary) A Kapros	7	6^{4}	3
(Switzerland) M Vavrinec	5	7^{7}	6
(Hungary) R Kuti-Kis	5	3
6	(Czech Republic) A Gerši	7	6

Second round
1	(Austria) S Plischke	5	1
Q	(Hungary) K Marosi	7	6
Q	(Russia) L Krasnoroutskaya	4	3
7	(Netherlands) K Boogert	6	6
4	(Spain) Á Montolio	5	6	6
Q	(Germany) E Wagner	7	2	1
(Switzerland) M Vavrinec	6^{4}	7^{7}	6
6	(Czech Republic) A Gerši	7^{7}	6^{3}	4

Quarterfinals
Q	(Hungary) K Marosi	6	4	4
7	(Netherlands) K Boogert	3	6	6
4	(Spain) Á Montolio	6	6
(Switzerland) M Vavrinec	1	1

Semifinals
7	(Netherlands) K Boogert	6	6
4	(Spain) Á Montolio	4	2

=== Bottom half ===
First round
5	(Spain) C Torrens Valero	2	5
(Italy) T Garbin	6	7
(Australia) A Molik	7^{7}	5	6
(Germany) J Kandarr	6^{2}	7	2
(Czech Republic) S Kleinová	2	7^{7}	4
(Belarus) O Barabanschikova	6	6^{5}	6
(France) A Cocheteux	3	3
3	(Slovenia) K Habšudová	6	6
8	(Austria) P Wartusch	7	3	3
(Federal Republic of Yugoslavia) S Načuk	5	6	6
(Spain) M Sánchez Lorenzo	6	7
(Venezuela) M Vento	4	5
(Croatia) J Kostanić	2	1
(Netherlands) A Hopmans	6	6
Q	(Germany) G Arn	4	6	3
2	(France) S Pitkowski	6	3	6

Second round
(Italy) T Garbin	3	6	6
(Australia) A Molik	6	3	1
(Belarus) O Barabanschikova	6
3	(Slovenia) K Habšudová	2	r
(Federal Republic of Yugoslavia) S Načuk	2	6	1
(Spain) M Sánchez Lorenzo	6	1	6
(Netherlands) A Hopmans	3	1
2	(France) S Pitkowski	6	6

Quarterfinals
(Italy) T Garbin	4	6	6
(Belarus) O Barabanschikova	6	0	1
(Spain) M Sánchez Lorenzo	5	1
2	(France) S Pitkowski	7	6

Semifinals
(Italy) T Garbin	6	3
2	(France) S Pitkowski	3	0^{r}
