= 1999 Tashkent Open – Singles =

Singles
- 1999 Tashkent Open

Final
- Champion: (Israel) Anna Smashnova
- Runner-up: (Belgium) Laurence Courtois
- Score: 6–3, 6–3

Details
- Draw: 32
- Seeds: 8

Events
Singles	Doubles
Tashkent Open	· 2000 →

The 1999 Tashkent Open singles was the singles event of the first edition of the Tashkent Open; a WTA Tier IVb tournament and the most prestigious women's tennis tournament held in Central Asia.

Anna Smashnova won in the final 6–3, 6–3 against Laurence Courtois, to win what was her first WTA Tour title.

== Seeds ==
1. (Israel) Anna Smashnova (champion)
2. (Russia) Tatiana Panova (second round)
3. (Belgium) Laurence Courtois (final)
4. (Russia) Evgenia Kulikovskaya (first round)
5. (Italy) Adriana Serra Zanetti (second round)
6. (Austria) Patricia Wartusch (second round)
7. (Netherlands) Seda Noorlander (first round)
8. (United States) Meilen Tu (first round)

== Draw ==
=== Key ===
- Q = Qualifier
- WC = Wild card
- LL = Lucky loser
- Alt = Alternate
- SE = Special exempt
- PR = Protected ranking
- ITF = ITF entry
- JE = Junior exempt
- w/o = Walkover
- r = Retired
- d = Defaulted
- SR = Special ranking

=== Finals ===
Semifinals
1	(Israel) Anna Smashnova	6	6
Q	(Germany) Angelika Bachmann	1	3
3	(Belgium) Laurence Courtois	6	6
(Slovenia) Tina Pisnik	0	4

Final
1	(Israel) Anna Smashnova	6	6
3	(Belgium) Laurence Courtois	3	3

=== Top half ===
First round
1	(Israel) A Smashnova	7	6
(Australia) A Ellwood	5	3
WC	(Uzbekistan) L Biktyakova	2	5
Q	(Japan) K Nagatomi	6	7
(Romania) A Vanc	1	6	3
(Italy) F Perfetti	6	1	6
(Italy) T Garbin	6	6
8	(United States) M Tu	4	3
4	(Russia) E Kulikovskaya	4	4
Q	(Germany) A Bachmann	6	6
(Germany) A Barna	5	3
(Switzerland) M Vavrinec	7	6
(Spain) G Riera	3	3
(Russia) E Makarova	6	6
(Germany) J Abe	3	1
6	(Austria) P Wartusch	6	6

Second round
1	(Israel) A Smashnova	6	6
Q	(Japan) K Nagatomi	2	0
(Italy) F Perfetti	0	7^{7}	2
(Italy) T Garbin	6	6^{5}	6
Q	(Germany) A Bachmann	6	6
(Switzerland) M Vavrinec	2	4
(Russia) E Makarova	6	4	6
6	(Austria) P Wartusch	2	6	4

Quarterfinals
1	(Israel) A Smashnova	7	6^{6}	6
(Italy) T Garbin	5	7^{8}	2
Q	(Germany) A Bachmann	6	6
(Russia) E Makarova	1	3

Semifinals
1	(Israel) A Smashnova	6	6
Q	(Germany) A Bachmann	1	3

=== Bottom half ===
First round
5	(Italy) A Serra Zanetti	1	7	6
Q	(Russia) A Myskina	6	5	3
(Spain) E Bes-Ostáriz	6^{7}	4
(Romania) R Sandu	7^{9}	6
(Paraguay) L Schaerer	1	7^{7}	4
(Hungary) P Mandula	6	6^{5}	6
(Czech Republic) A Gerši	6	4	6^{5}
3	(Belgium) L Courtois	4	6	7^{7}
7	(Netherlands) S Noorlander	1	3
WC	(Uzbekistan) I Tulyaganova	6	6
(Slovenia) T Pisnik	7^{7}	6^{4}	7
(Italy) F Lubiani	6^{3}	7^{7}	5
(Israel) H Rosen	5	4
(Russia) E Dementieva	7	6
Q	(Ukraine) A Zaporozhanova	4	6	1
2	(Russia) T Panova	6	0	6

Second round
5	(Italy) A Serra Zanetti	4	7	4
(Romania) R Sandu	6	5	6
(Hungary) P Mandula	5	2
3	(Belgium) L Courtois	7	6
WC	(Uzbekistan) I Tulyaganova	2	6	3
(Slovenia) T Pisnik	6	2	6
(Russia) E Dementieva	6	3
2	(Russia) T Panova	3	0	r

Quarterfinals
(Romania) R Sandu	1	0
3	(Belgium) L Courtois	6	6
(Slovenia) T Pisnik	4	6	6
(Russia) E Dementieva	6	2	3

Semifinals
3	(Belgium) L Courtois	6	6
(Slovenia) T Pisnik	0	4

== Qualifying ==
=== Seeds ===
1. n.a.
2. (Japan) Haruka Inoue (first round)
3. (Israel) Nataly Cahana (qualifying competition)
4. (Belarus) Nadejda Ostrovskaya (qualifying competition)
5. (Germany) Adriana Barna (first round)
6. (Russia) Anastasia Myskina (Qualifier)
7. (Japan) Keiko Nagatomi (Qualifier)
8. (Germany) Angelika Bachmann (Qualifier)
9. (Russia) Maria Goloviznina (first round)

=== Qualifiers ===
1. (Germany) Angelika Bachmann
2. (Russia) Anastasia Myskina
3. (Ukraine) Anna Zaporozhanova
4. (Japan) Keiko Nagatomi

== Qualifying draw ==
=== Key ===
- Q = Qualifier
- WC = Wild card
- LL = Lucky loser
- Alt = Alternate
- SE = Special exempt
- PR = Protected ranking
- ITF = ITF entry
- JE = Junior exempt
- w/o = Walkover
- r = Retired
- d = Defaulted
- SR = Special ranking

=== First qualifier ===
First round
9	(Russia) Maria Goloviznina	6	5	6
(Ukraine) Tatiana Perebiynis	4	7	1
Bye
WC	(Uzbekistan) Maria Djordjio
WC	(Uzbekistan) Natalia Nikitina	6	6
WC	(Uzbekistan) Olga Timofeeva	3	0
(India) Archana Venkataraman	2	0
8	(Germany) Angelika Bachmann	6	6

Second round
(Ukraine) Tatiana Perebiynis	6	6
WC	(Uzbekistan) Maria Djordjio	1	2
WC	(Uzbekistan) Natalia Nikitina	2	0
8	(Germany) Angelika Bachmann	6	6

Qualifying competition
(Ukraine) Tatiana Perebiynis	6^{5}	6^{7}
8	(Germany) Angelika Bachmann	7^{7}	7^{9}

=== Second qualifier ===
First round
3	(Israel) Nataly Cahana	6	6
WC	(Uzbekistan) Anna Shchupak	2	2
WC	(Uzbekistan) Ksenia Gorbunova	0	0
WC	(Uzbekistan) Gulvona Khodjaeva	6	6
(Russia) Svetlana Mossiakova	1	6	3
(India) Arthi Venkataraman	6	0	6
(Russia) Elena Voropaeva	3	2
6	(Russia) Anastasia Myskina	6	6

Second round
3	(Israel) Nataly Cahana	6	6
WC	(Uzbekistan) Gulvona Khodjaeva	0	0
(India) Arthi Venkataraman	1	1
6	(Russia) Anastasia Myskina	6	6

Qualifying competition
3	(Israel) Nataly Cahana	3	4
6	(Russia) Anastasia Myskina	6	6

=== Third qualifier ===
First round
5	(Germany) Adriana Barna	2	3
(Ukraine) Anna Zaporozhanova	6	6
(Russia) Anastasia Rodionova	6	6
(Russia) Ekaterina Sysoeva	4	2
(Russia) Ekaterina Paniouchkina	6	6
WC	(Uzbekistan) Nargisa Akramova	1	0
(Hungary) Zsófia Gubacsi	4	5
4	(Belarus) Nadejda Ostrovskaya	6	7

Second round
(Ukraine) Anna Zaporozhanova	6	6
(Russia) Anastasia Rodionova	3	0
(Russia) Ekaterina Paniouchkina	3	4
4	(Belarus) Nadejda Ostrovskaya	6	6

Qualifying competition
(Ukraine) Anna Zaporozhanova	6	7^{7}
4	(Belarus) Nadejda Ostrovskaya	1	6^{3}

=== Fourth qualifier ===
First round
7	(Japan) Keiko Nagatomi	6	6
(Russia) Irina Kornienko	1	2
WC	(Uzbekistan) Alexandra Zadoryn	0	3
WC	(Uzbekistan) Luiza Biktyakova	6	6
WC	(Uzbekistan) Furuza Gafurova	2	4
(Japan) Keiko Ishida	6	6
(Germany) Caroline Schneider	6	6
2	(Japan) Haruka Inoue	2	2

Second round
7	(Japan) Keiko Nagatomi	6	6
WC	(Uzbekistan) Luiza Biktyakova	3	2
(Japan) Keiko Ishida	1	3
(Germany) Caroline Schneider	6	6

Qualifying competition
7	(Japan) Keiko Nagatomi	6	7^{7}
(Germany) Caroline Schneider	4	6^{5}
