= 1998 Budapest Lotto Open – Doubles =

Doubles
- 1998 Budapest Lotto Open

Final
- Champions: (Spain) Virginia Ruano Pascual (Argentina) Paola Suárez
- Runners-up: (Romania) Cătălina Cristea (Argentina) Laura Montalvo
- Score: 4–6, 6–1, 6–1

Events
Singles	Doubles
- Budapest Lotto Open

Amanda Coetzer and Alexandra Fusai were the defending champions but did not compete that year.

Virginia Ruano Pascual and Paola Suárez won in the final 4–6, 6–1, 6–1 against Cătălina Cristea and Laura Montalvo.

== Seeds ==
Champion seeds are indicated in bold text while text in italics indicates the round in which those seeds were eliminated.

1. (Spain) **Virginia Ruano Pascual** / (Argentina) **Paola Suárez (champions)**
2. (Romania) Cătălina Cristea / (Argentina) Laura Montalvo (final)
3. (Bulgaria) Svetlana Krivencheva / (Czech Republic) Eva Melicharová (quarterfinals)
4. (Italy) Laura Golarsa / (South Africa) Liezel Horn (semifinals)

== Draw ==
Key

- Q = Qualifier
- WC = Wild card
- LL = Lucky loser
- Alt = Alternate
- ITF = ITF entry
- PR = Protected ranking
- SR = Special ranking
- SE = Special exempt
- JE = Junior exempt
- JR = Junior Accelerator Programme entrant
- CO = College Accelerator Programme entrant
- NG = Next Gen Accelerator Program entrant
- w/o = Walkover
- r = Retired
- d = Defaulted

First round
1	(Spain) **V Ruano Pascual** (Argentina) **P Suárez**	**6**	**6**
(Spain) E Bes (Hungary) K Marosi	0	1
(Federal Republic of Yugoslavia) **S Naćuk** (Austria) **P Wartusch**	**6**	1	**6**
(France) J Halard-Decugis (Slovakia) J Husárová	3	**6**	4
4	(Italy) **L Golarsa** (South Africa) **L Horn**	**6**	4	**6**
(Hungary) P Gáspár (France) A-G Sidot	4	**6**	3
WC	(Hungary) **Z Gubacsi** (Hungary) **R Kuti-Kis**	**6**	**6**
Q	(Hungary) E Doman (Hungary) A Piski	4	3
(France) A Dechaume-Balleret (Germany) B Rittner
(France) **N Dechy** (France) **L Ghirardi**	**w/o**
(Russia) E Kulikovskaya (Slovakia) K Studeníková	2	1
3	(Bulgaria) **S Krivencheva** (Czech Republic) **E Melicharová**	**6**	**6**
(Italy) S Cecchini (Germany) W Probst	4	1
(Italy) **S Farina** (France) **S Testud**	**6**	**6**
(Hungary) V Csurgó (Slovenia) T Križan	3	5
2	(Romania) **C Cristea** (Argentina) **L Montalvo**	**6**	**7**

Quarterfinals
1	(Spain) **V Ruano Pascual** (Argentina) **P Suárez**	**6**	**6**
(Federal Republic of Yugoslavia) S Naćuk (Austria) P Wartusch	1	0
4	(Italy) **L Golarsa** (South Africa) **L Horn**	**6**	**6**
WC	(Hungary) Z Gubacsi (Hungary) R Kuti-Kis	4	2
(France) **N Dechy** (France) **L Ghirardi**	**6**	**6**
3	(Bulgaria) S Krivencheva (Czech Republic) E Melicharová	4	2
(Italy) S Farina (France) S Testud	3	3
2	(Romania) **C Cristea** (Argentina) **L Montalvo**	**6**	**6**

Semifinals
1	(Spain) **V Ruano Pascual** (Argentina) **P Suárez**	**6**	**6**
4	(Italy) L Golarsa (South Africa) L Horn	3	3
(France) N Dechy (France) L Ghirardi	2	**6**	1
2	(Romania) **C Cristea** (Argentina) **L Montalvo**	**6**	2	**6**

Final
1	(Spain) **Virginia Ruano Pascual** (Argentina) **Paola Suárez**	4	**6**	**6**
2	(Romania) Cătălina Cristea (Argentina) Laura Montalvo	**6**	1	1
