= 1999 Tashkent Open =

- Date: 7–13 June
- Edition: 1st
- Category: Tier IVb
- Draw: 32S / 16D
- Prize money: $112,500
- Surface: Hard / outdoor
- Location: Tashkent, Uzbekistan
- Venue: Tashkent Tennis Center

Champions

Singles
- (Israel) Anna Smashnova

Doubles
- (Russia) Evgenia Kulikovskaya / (Austria) Patricia Wartusch
Tashkent Open	· 2000 →

The 1999 Tashkent Open was a women's tennis tournament played on hard courts at the Tashkent Tennis Center in Tashkent, Uzbekistan that was part of the Tier IVb category of the 1999 WTA Tour. It was the inaugural edition of the tournament and was held from 7 June through 13 June 1999. First-seeded Anna Smashnova won the singles title and earned $16,000 first-prize money.

== Finals ==
=== Singles ===
(Israel) Anna Smashnova defeated (Belgium) Laurence Courtois, 6–3, 6–3

- It was Smashnova's only singles title of the year and the first of her career.

=== Doubles ===
(Russia) Evgenia Kulikovskaya / (Austria) Patricia Wartusch defeated (Spain) Eva Bes / (Spain) Gisela Riera, 7–6^{(7–3)}, 6–0

== Entrants ==
=== Seeds ===
Country	Player	Rank	Seed
ISR	Anna Smashnova	41	1
RUS	Tatiana Panova	68	2
BEL	Laurence Courtois	94	3
RUS	Evgenia Kulikovskaya	101	4
ITA	Adriana Serra Zanetti	111	5
AUT	Patricia Wartusch	115	6
NED	Seda Noorlander	117	7
USA	Meilen Tu	118	8

=== Other entrants ===
The following players received wildcards into the singles main draw:

- (Uzbekistan) Lilia Biktyakova
- (Uzbekistan) Iroda Tulyaganova

The following players received wildcards into the doubles main draw:

- (Ukraine) Tatiana Perebiynis / (Uzbekistan) Iroda Tulyaganova

The following players received entry from the singles qualifying draw:

- (Japan) Keiko Nagatomi
- (Germany) Angelika Bachmann
- (Russia) Anastasia Myskina
- (Ukraine) Anna Zaporozhanova

The following players received entry from the doubles qualifying draw:

- (Russia) Ekaterina Paniouchkina / (Russia) Anastasia Rodionova
