= 2000 Westel 900 Budapest Open – Doubles =

Doubles
- 2000 Westel 900 Budapest Open

Final
- Champions: (Bulgaria) Lubomira Bacheva (Spain) Cristina Torrens Valero
- Runners-up: (Croatia) Jelena Kostanić (Federal Republic of Yugoslavia) Sandra Načuk
- Score: 6–0, 6–2

Details
- Draw: 16 (1WC/1Q)
- Seeds: 4

Events
Singles	Doubles
← 1999 ·	Hungarian Ladies Open	· 2001 →

Evgenia Kulikovskaya and Sandra Načuk were the defending champions, but Kulikovskaya did not compete this year.

Načuk teamed up with Jelena Kostanić and lost in the final to Lubomira Bacheva and Cristina Torrens Valero. The score was 6–0, 6–2.

== Seeds ==
1. (France) Alexandra Fusai / (Slovakia) Karina Habšudová (quarterfinals, withdrew)
2. (Slovenia) Tina Križan / (Slovenia) Katarina Srebotnik (semifinals)
3. (Netherlands) Kristie Boogert / (Netherlands) Miriam Oremans (quarterfinals)
4. (Romania) Cătălina Cristea / (Austria) Patricia Wartusch (semifinals)

== Draw ==
=== Key ===
- Q = Qualifier
- WC = Wild card
- LL = Lucky loser
- Alt = Alternate
- SE = Special exempt
- PR = Protected ranking
- ITF = ITF entry
- JE = Junior exempt
- w/o = Walkover
- r = Retired
- d = Defaulted
- SR = Special ranking

=== Draw ===
First round
1	(France) A Fusai (Slovakia) K Habšudová	6	6
(Hungary) V Csurgó (Spain) M Sánchez Lorenzo	1	4
(Croatia) J Kostanić (Federal Republic of Yugoslavia) S Načuk	6	6
(Czech Republic) E Martincová (Bulgaria) E Wagner	3	4
4	(Romania) C Cristea (Austria) P Wartusch	6	6
(South Africa) K Grant (United States) R Jensen	2	4
Q	(Russia) L Krasnoroutskaya (Austria) M Maruska	4	6	6
(France) A Cocheteux (France) C Dhenin	6	0	1
(Bulgaria) L Bacheva (Spain) C Torrens Valero	6	6^{5}	6
(Italy) T Garbin (Hungary) K Marosi	4	7^{7}	2
(Russia) O Barabanschikova (Hungary) P Mandula	6	6^{4}	2
3	(Netherlands) K Boogert (Netherlands) M Oremans	3	7^{7}	6
(Slovakia) J Husárová (Hungary) R Kuti-Kis	7^{7}	7
WC	(Hungary) Z Gubacsi (Hungary) A Kapros	6^{3}	5
(Germany) J Kandarr (France) S Pitkowski	7^{7}	6^{2}	4
2	(Slovenia) T Križan (Slovenia) K Srebotnik	6^{5}	7^{7}	6

Quarterfinals
1	(France) A Fusai (Slovakia) K Habšudová
(Croatia) J Kostanić (Federal Republic of Yugoslavia) S Načuk	w/o
4	(Romania) C Cristea (Austria) P Wartusch	6	6
Q	(Russia) L Krasnoroutskaya (Austria) M Maruska	4	1
(Bulgaria) L Bacheva (Spain) C Torrens Valero	1	6	6
3	(Netherlands) K Boogert (Netherlands) M Oremans	6	2	3
(Slovakia) J Husárová (Hungary) R Kuti-Kis	2	2
2	(Slovenia) T Križan (Slovenia) K Srebotnik	6	6

Semifinals
(Croatia) J Kostanić (Federal Republic of Yugoslavia) S Načuk	6	6
4	(Romania) C Cristea (Austria) P Wartusch	2	3
(Bulgaria) L Bacheva (Spain) C Torrens Valero	6	6
2	(Slovenia) T Križan (Slovenia) K Srebotnik	4	3

Final
(Croatia) J Kostanić (Federal Republic of Yugoslavia) S Načuk	0	2
(Bulgaria) L Bacheva (Spain) C Torrens Valero	6	6
