= Boris Bošnjaković =

Serbian tennis player and coach (born 1974)

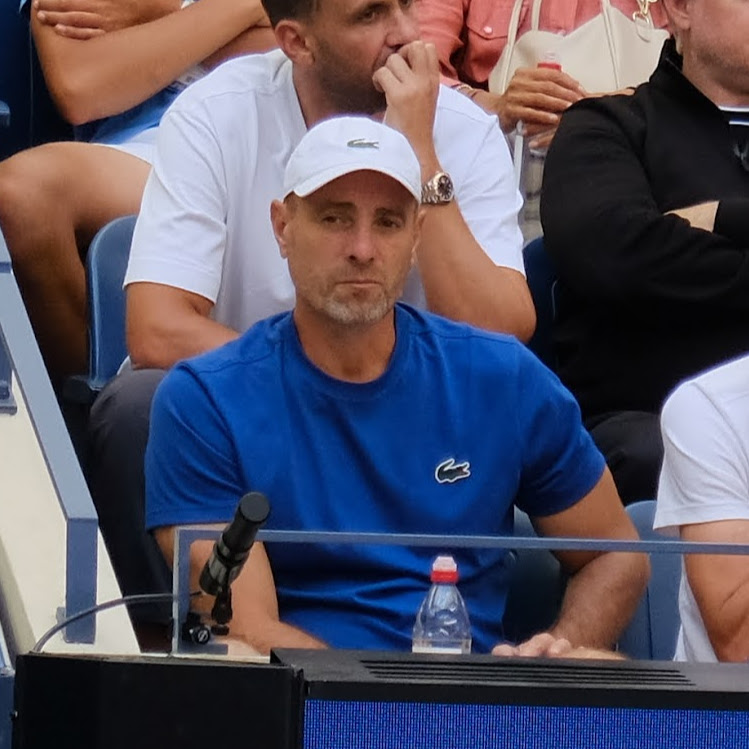
- Boris Bošnjaković in 2025 during the US Open
- Born: 10 May 1974 (age 51) Novi Sad, SR Serbia, SFR Yugoslavia
- Height: 6 ft 3 in (191 cm)
- Turned pro: 1997
- Retired: 2000
- Plays: Right-handed
- College: Brigham Young University (1993–1997)

Singles
- Career record: 105–39 (college)
- Highest ranking: Top 50 Juniors ITF; No. 58 in NCAA Division I singles (1996–97); No. 740 ATP (21 September 1998)

Doubles
- Career record: 55–37 (college)
- Highest ranking: No. 32 nationally in NCAA Division I doubles (1996–97)

Boris Bošnjaković (born 10 May 1974) is currently Novak Djokovic's head coach and former professional tennis player. He was top 50 junior in the world, a junior national champion in Yugoslavia, played collegiate tennis at Brigham Young University, and later competed professionally before retiring in 2000. Since then, he has coached players on the ATP and WTA Tours, served on Serbia’s Davis Cup staff during the 2010 title, and became part of Novak Djokovic’s coaching team in 2023, assuming a lead role in 2024–25.

== Early life and education ==
Bošnjaković was born in 1974 in Novi Sad, SR Serbia, SFR Yugoslavia. As a junior, he trained at Tennis Club Vojvodina, won the Yugoslav U-18 championship in 1991, reached a top-50 ITF junior ranking in 1992, and was named to the Yugoslav Davis Cup team that year. The team did not compete due to international sanctions on Yugoslavia.

He attended Foothill High School in Santa Ana, California, before enrolling at Brigham Young University (1993–1997), where he played No. 1 singles and doubles all four seasons under coach Jim Osborne. While there he compiled a 105–39 singles record and a 55–37 doubles record. In 1996–97 he was ranked No. 58 nationally in singles and No. 32 in doubles in NCAA Division I tennis.

== Professional playing career ==
Bošnjaković turned professional in 1997 and competed on the ITF Futures and ATP Challenger circuits until his retirement in 2000 due to injuries. He achieved a career-high ATP singles ranking of world No. 740 on 21 September 1998.

== Coaching career ==
=== Early coaching ===
Bošnjaković began coaching in 2000 on the ATP and WTA Tours. He has worked with Jelena Janković, Tina Pisnik, Janet Lee, Sandra Naćuk, Olga Danilović, Ilija Bozoljac, Ivo Karlović and Dušan Lajović. Bošnjaković has also worked with coaches including Roy Emerson, Goran Ivanišević, Niki Pilić, Marián Vajda and Dennis Ralston.

=== Serbia Davis Cup team (2010–2012) ===
In 2010, he served on Serbia’s Davis Cup as head coach alongside captain Bogdan Obradović and advisor Niki Pilić during the nation’s first Davis Cup title; players included Novak Djokovic, Janko Tipsarević, Viktor Troicki and Nenad Zimonjić. He remained with the team through 2012.

=== Brown University (2013–2015) ===
In September 2013, Bošnjaković joined Brown University as an assistant coach for the men’s tennis team, serving until 2015.

=== Novak Tennis Centre (2020–2023) ===
In early 2020, he became head coach at the Novak Tennis Centre in Belgrade, overseeing junior development until its closure in 2023.

=== Team Djokovic (2023–present) ===
Bošnjaković occasionally assisted Marián Vajda from 2010 and officially joined Novak Djokovic’s coaching team in late 2023. He worked with Goran Ivanišević as an assistant coach and performance analyst. After Djokovic and Ivanišević parted ways in 2024, Bošnjaković acted as head coach during the French Open, Wimbledon, the Olympics and the US Open that year. In 2025, he worked closely with Andy Murray during the Australian Open who regarded Bošnjaković as "brilliant" in a 2025 interview. After Murray’s departure, Djokovic announced that Bošnjaković and Dušan Vemić would split head coaching duties for the Geneva Open, Roland Garros and Wimbledon in 2025. Since Wimbledon 2025, Bošnjaković has been Djokovic's head coach, including at the US Open, Shanghai Masters and Hellenic Championship which Djokovic won as his 101st ATP title to climb back up to year-end ranking of 4th. Bošnjaković is continuing in his coaching role in 2026 beginning with the Australian Open.

== PTPA and PTCA roles ==
Since November 2023, Bošnjaković has served as a Professional Coach Ambassador for the Professional Tennis Players Association (PTPA). He was named the PTPA’s first Coach Liaison in January 2025. He is an Accredited Master Professional with the Professional Tennis Coaches Association (PTCA). Bošnjaković has served as liaison between the PTPA and PTCA since their 2025 partnership.
