= 1999 Westel 900 Budapest Open – Singles =

Singles
- 1999 Westel 900 Budapest Open

Final
- Champion: (France) Sarah Pitkowski
- Runner-up: (Spain) Cristina Torrens Valero
- Score: 6–2, 6–2

Details
- Draw: 32
- Seeds: 8

Events
Singles	Doubles
← 1998 ·	Westel 900 Budapest Open	· 2000 →

The 1999 Westel 900 Budapest Open singles was the singles event of the second edition of the Budapest Grand Prix; a WTA Tier IV tournament and the most prestigious women's tennis tournament held in Hungary. Virginia Ruano Pascual was the defending champion but lost in the first round to Amanda Hopmans.

Sarah Pitkowski won in the final 6–2, 6–2 against Cristina Torrens Valero.

== Seeds ==
1. (Czech Republic) Jana Novotná (first round)
2. (Slovakia) Henrieta Nagyová (first round)
3. (Italy) Silvia Farina (first round)
4. (Spain) Virginia Ruano Pascual (first round)
5. (France) Nathalie Dechy (second round)
6. (Spain) María Sánchez Lorenzo (first round)
7. (France) Sarah Pitkowski (champion)
8. (Spain) Gala León García (first round)

== Draw ==
=== Key ===
- Q = Qualifier
- WC = Wild card
- LL = Lucky loser
- Alt = Alternate
- SE = Special exempt
- PR = Protected ranking
- ITF = ITF entry
- JE = Junior exempt
- w/o = Walkover
- r = Retired
- d = Defaulted
- SR = Special ranking

=== Finals ===
Semifinals
(Czech Republic) Denisa Chládková	4	4
(Spain) Cristina Torrens Valero	6	6
(Hungary) Rita Kuti-Kis	3	6	6^{2}
7	(France) Sarah Pitkowski	6	3	7^{7}

Final
(Spain) Cristina Torrens Valero	2	2
7	(France) Sarah Pitkowski	6	6

=== Top half ===
First round
1	(Czech Republic) J Novotná	4	3
(Slovakia) Ľ Cervanová	6	6
Q	(Poland) K Straczy	1	6	3
Q	(Czech Republic) E Martincová	6	3	6
(Argentina) M Díaz Oliva	6^{3}	1
(Germany) E Wagner	7^{7}	6
(Czech Republic) D Chládková	6	6
8	(Spain) G León García	3	2
4	(Spain) V Ruano Pascual	2	4
(Netherlands) A Hopmans	6	6
(Austria) B Schwartz	3	6	6
(Federal Republic of Yugoslavia) S Naćuk	6	2	3
(Italy) A Serra Zanetti	2	2
(Spain) C Torrens Valero	6	6
(Croatia) S Talaja	3	4
5	(France) N Dechy	6	6

Second round
(Slovakia) Ľ Cervanová	5	6	5
Q	(Czech Republic) E Martincová	7	1	7
(Germany) E Wagner	1	1
(Czech Republic) D Chládková	6	6
(Netherlands) A Hopmans	7	6
(Austria) B Schwartz	5	1
(Spain) C Torrens Valero	7	6
5	(France) N Dechy	5	3

Quarterfinals
Q	(Czech Republic) E Martincová	4	2
(Czech Republic) D Chládková	6	6
(Netherlands) A Hopmans	2	0
(Spain) C Torrens Valero	6	6

Semifinals
(Czech Republic) D Chládková	4	4
(Spain) C Torrens Valero	6	6

=== Bottom half ===
First round
6	(Spain) M Sánchez Lorenzo	2	7	5
(Hungary) A Földényi	6	5	7
LL	(Austria) S Dopfer	4	6	3
(Czech Republic) L Němečková	6	4	6
(Germany) J Abe	2	6	2
(Hungary) P Mandula	6	4	6
(Hungary) R Kuti-Kis	3	6	6
3	(Italy) S Farina	6	2	3
7	(France) S Pitkowski	3	7^{7}	6
Q	(Hungary) Z Gubacsi	6	6^{3}	1
(Canada) J Nejedly	4	6	6
Q	(Slovakia) M Suchá	6	3	4
(Germany) J Kandarr	4	6	6
(Slovakia) K Studeníková	6	4	2
(Russia) E Kulikovskaya	1	6	6
2	(Slovakia) H Nagyová	6	3	3

Second round
(Hungary) A Földényi	6	6^{4}	6^{5}
(Czech Republic) L Němečková	2	7^{7}	7^{7}
(Hungary) P Mandula	6	1	6^{3}
(Hungary) R Kuti-Kis	2	6	7^{7}
7	(France) S Pitkowski	6	6
(Canada) J Nejedly	1	0
(Germany) J Kandarr	3	4
(Russia) E Kulikovskaya	6	6

Quarterfinals
(Czech Republic) L Němečková	1	3
(Hungary) R Kuti-Kis	6	6
7	(France) S Pitkowski	7	6
(Russia) E Kulikovskaya	5	2

Semifinals
(Hungary) R Kuti-Kis	3	6	6^{2}
7	(France) S Pitkowski	6	3	7^{7}

== Qualifying ==
=== Seeds ===
1. (Bulgaria) Lubomira Bacheva (second round)
2. (Germany) Anca Barna (second round)
3. (Austria) Marion Maruska (second round, retired)
4. (Austria) Sandra Dopfer (qualifying competition, lucky loser)
5. (Italy) Adriana Serra Zanetti (second round)
6. (Czech Republic) Radka Pelikánová (second round)
7. (Austria) Evelyn Fauth (second round)
8. (Slovakia) Martina Suchá (qualifier)

=== Qualifiers ===
1. (Hungary) Zsófia Gubacsi
2. (Czech Republic) Eva Martincová
3. (Poland) Katarzyna Straczy
4. (Slovakia) Martina Suchá

=== Lucky losers ===
1. (Austria) Sandra Dopfer

== Qualifying draw ==
=== Key ===
- Q = Qualifier
- WC = Wild card
- LL = Lucky loser
- Alt = Alternate
- SE = Special exempt
- PR = Protected ranking
- ITF = ITF entry
- JE = Junior exempt
- w/o = Walkover
- r = Retired
- d = Defaulted
- SR = Special ranking

=== First qualifier ===
First round
1	(Bulgaria) Lubomira Bacheva
Bye
(Hungary) Boglárka Berecz	1	4
(Czech Republic) Libuše Průšová	6	6
(Slovakia) Zuzana Váleková	3	6	4
WC	(Hungary) Zsófia Gubacsi	6	4	6
(Romania) Magda Mihalache	5	3
7	(Austria) Evelyn Fauth	7	6

Second round
1	(Bulgaria) Lubomira Bacheva	4	6	6^{6}
(Czech Republic) Libuše Průšová	6	4	7^{8}
WC	(Hungary) Zsófia Gubacsi	6	3	6
7	(Austria) Evelyn Fauth	0	6	4

Qualifying competition
(Czech Republic) Libuše Průšová	6^{4}	3
WC	(Hungary) Zsófia Gubacsi	7^{7}	6

=== Second qualifier ===
First round
4	(Austria) Sandra Dopfer	6	6
(Hungary) Kinga Berecz	3	0
(Czech Republic) Ludmila Richterová	6	6
(Germany) Adriana Barna	3	2
(Austria) Nicole Remis	2	6	2
(Czech Republic) Eva Martincová	6	2	6
(Germany) Meike Fröhlich	5	4
5	(Italy) Adriana Serra Zanetti	7	6

Second round
4	(Austria) Sandra Dopfer	6	7
(Czech Republic) Ludmila Richterová	4	5
(Czech Republic) Eva Martincová	6	4	6
5	(Italy) Adriana Serra Zanetti	4	6	3

Qualifying competition
4	(Austria) Sandra Dopfer	3	1
(Czech Republic) Eva Martincová	6	6

=== Third qualifier ===
First round
6	(Czech Republic) Radka Pelikánová	6	6
WC	(Austria) Bettina Pirker	1	3
(Hungary) Adrienn Hegedűs	4	6	1
(Czech Republic) Renata Kučerová	6	3	6
(Czech Republic) Eva Melicharová	7	5	0
(Poland) Katarzyna Strączy	5	7	6
(Germany) Christiane Hoppmann	6	1	1
3	(Austria) Marion Maruska	0	6	6

Second round
6	(Czech Republic) Radka Pelikánová	3	0
(Czech Republic) Renata Kučerová	6	6
(Poland) Katarzyna Strączy	4
3	(Austria) Marion Maruska	1^{r}

Qualifying competition
(Czech Republic) Renata Kučerová	1	0
(Poland) Katarzyna Strączy	6	6

=== Fourth qualifier ===
First round
8	(Slovakia) Martina Suchá	6	6
(Spain) Ana Salas Lozano	3	2
(Hungary) Edit Pákay	0	4
(Germany) Gréta Arn	6	6
WC	(Hungary) Anikó Kapros	6^{5}	6	6
(Germany) Gabriela Kučerová	7^{7}	3	0
(Germany) Angelika Rösch	2	6	0
2	(Germany) Anca Barna	6	4	6

Second round
8	(Slovakia) Martina Suchá	6	6
(Germany) Gréta Arn	3	3
WC	(Hungary) Anikó Kapros	6	6
2	(Germany) Anca Barna	3	1

Qualifying competition
8	(Slovakia) Martina Suchá	7	6
WC	(Hungary) Anikó Kapros	5	1
