= 1998 Budapest Lotto Open =

- Date: 20 – 26 April
- Edition: 3rd
- Category: Tier IV
- Draw: 32S / 16D
- Prize money: $107,500
- Surface: Clay / Outdoor
- Location: Budapest, Hungary

Champions

Singles
- (Spain) Virginia Ruano Pascual

Doubles
- (Spain) Virginia Ruano Pascual / (Argentina) Paola Suárez
← 1997 ·	Hungarian Ladies Open	· 1999 →

The 1998 Budapest Lotto Open was a women's tennis tournament played on outdoor clay courts in Budapest, Hungary that was part of the Tier IV category of the 1998 WTA Tour. It was the third edition of the tournament and was held from 20 April until 26 April 1998. Seventh-seeded Virginia Ruano Pascual won the singles title and earned $17,700 first-prize money.

== Finals ==
=== Singles ===
(Spain) Virginia Ruano Pascual defeated (Italy) Silvia Farina 6–4, 4–6, 6–3

- It was Ruano Pascual's 1st singles title of the year and the 2nd of her career.

=== Doubles ===
(Spain) Virginia Ruano Pascual / (Argentina) Paola Suárez defeated (Romania) Cătălina Cristea / (Argentina) Laura Montalvo 4–6, 6–1, 6–1

- It was Ruano Pascual's 3rd title of the year and the 4th of her career. It was Suárez's 4th title of the year and the 5th of her career.
