= 1999 Tashkent Open – Doubles =

Doubles
- 1999 Tashkent Open

Final
- Champions: (Russia) Evgenia Kulikovskaya (Austria) Patricia Wartusch
- Runners-up: (Spain) Eva Bes (Spain) Gisela Riera
- Score: 7–6^{(7–3)}, 6–0

Details
- Draw: 16
- Seeds: 4

Events
Singles	Doubles
- Tashkent Open

The 1999 Tashkent Open doubles was the doubles event of the first edition of the Tashkent Open; a WTA Tier IV tournament and the most prestigious women's tennis tournament held in Central Asia.

Evgenia Kulikovskaya and Patricia Wartusch won in the final, 7–6^{(7–3)}, 6–0, against the Spanish team of Eva Bes and Gisela Riera.

== Seeds ==
1. (Australia) Annabel Ellwood / (Germany) Caroline Schneider (first round)
2. (Russia) Evgenia Kulikovskaya / (Austria) Patricia Wartusch (champions)
3. (Spain) Eva Bes / (Spain) Gisela Riera (final)
4. (Paraguay) Larissa Schaerer / (Romania) Andreea Vanc (first round)

== Draw ==
Key

- Q = Qualifier
- WC = Wild card
- LL = Lucky loser
- Alt = Alternate
- ITF = ITF entry
- PR = Protected ranking
- SR = Special ranking
- SE = Special exempt
- JE = Junior exempt
- JR = Junior Accelerator Programme entrant
- CO = College Accelerator Programme entrant
- NG = Next Gen Accelerator Program entrant
- w/o = Walkover
- r = Retired
- d = Defaulted

First round
1	(Australia) A Ellwood (Germany) C Schneider	6	3	3
(Slovenia) T Pisnik (United States) M Tu	1	6	6
Q	(Russia) E Paniouchkina (Russia) A Rodionova	7	2	2
(Germany) J Abe (Israel) N Cahana	5	6	6
3	(Spain) E Bes (Spain) G Riera	6	6^{6}	6
(Japan) K Ishida (Japan) K Nagatomi	4	7^{8}	3
(Russia) I Kornienko (Ukraine) A Zaporozhanova	6	6
(Russia) M Goloviznina (Russia) A Myskina	2	2
(Italy) F Lubiani (Italy) F Perfetti	3	3
WC	(Ukraine) T Perebiynis (Uzbekistan) I Tulyaganova	6	6
(Germany) A Bachmann (Russia) E Sysoeva	7^{10}	5	6
4	(Paraguay) L Schaerer (Romania) A Vanc	6^{8}	7	4
(Israel) H Rosen (Switzerland) M Vavrinec	1	2
(Germany) Ad Barna (Germany) An Barna	6	6
(Italy) T Garbin (Italy) A Serra Zanetti	2	4
2	(Russia) E Kulikovskaya (Austria) P Wartusch	6	6

Quarterfinals
(Slovenia) T Pisnik (United States) M Tu	6	7^{7}
(Germany) J Abe (Israel) N Cahana	4	6^{3}
3	(Spain) E Bes (Spain) G Riera	6	6
(Russia) I Kornienko (Ukraine) A Zaporozhanova	0	2
WC	(Ukraine) T Perebiynis (Uzbekistan) I Tulyaganova	6	7^{7}
(Germany) A Bachmann (Russia) E Sysoeva	4	6^{5}
(Germany) Ad Barna (Germany) An Barna
2	(Russia) E Kulikovskaya (Austria) P Wartusch	w/o

Semifinals
(Slovenia) T Pisnik (United States) M Tu	2	3
3	(Spain) E Bes (Spain) G Riera	6	6
WC	(Ukraine) T Perebiynis (Uzbekistan) I Tulyaganova	0	6^{5}
2	(Russia) E Kulikovskaya (Austria) P Wartusch	6	7^{7}

Final
3	(Spain) E Bes (Spain) G Riera	6^{3}	0
2	(Russia) E Kulikovskaya (Austria) P Wartusch	7^{7}	6

== Qualifying ==
=== Seeds ===
1. (Japan) Haruka Inoue / (Russia) Elena Voropaeva (qualifying competition)
2. (Belarus) Nadejda Ostrovskaya / (Russia) Tatiana Panova (second round)

=== Qualifiers ===
1. (Russia) Ekaterina Paniouchkina / (Russia) Anastasia Rodionova

== Qualifying draw ==
Key

- Q = Qualifier
- WC = Wild card
- LL = Lucky loser
- Alt = Alternate
- ITF = ITF entry
- PR = Protected ranking
- SR = Special ranking
- SE = Special exempt
- JE = Junior exempt
- JR = Junior Accelerator Programme entrant
- CO = College Accelerator Programme entrant
- NG = Next Gen Accelerator Program entrant
- w/o = Walkover
- r = Retired
- d = Defaulted

First round
1	(Japan) Haruka Inoue (Russia) Elena Voropaeva	8
(Uzbekistan) Gulvona Khodjaeva (Uzbekistan) Natalia Nikitina	0
(Uzbekistan) Maria Djordjio (Uzbekistan) Alexandra Zadoryn	2
(India) Archana Venkataraman (India) Arthi Venkataraman	8
(Russia) Ekaterina Paniouchkina (Russia) Anastasia Rodionova	8
(Uzbekistan) Furuza Gafurova (Russia) Svetlana Mossiakova	2
(Uzbekistan) Lilia Biktyakova (Uzbekistan) Luiza Biktyakova	2
2	(Belarus) Nadejda Ostrovskaya (Russia) Tatiana Panova	8

Second round
1	(Japan) Haruka Inoue (Russia) Elena Voropaeva	8
(India) Archana Venkataraman (India) Arthi Venkataraman	2
(Russia) Ekaterina Paniouchkina (Russia) Anastasia Rodionova	4
2	(Belarus) Nadejda Ostrovskaya (Russia) Tatiana Panova	8

Qualifying competition
1	(Japan) Haruka Inoue (Russia) Elena Voropaeva	6
(Russia) Ekaterina Paniouchkina (Russia) Anastasia Rodionova	8
