= 2000 Tashkent Open =

- Date: 12–18 June
- Edition: 2nd
- Category: Tier IVa
- Draw: 32S / 16D
- Prize money: $140,000
- Surface: Hard / outdoor
- Location: Tashkent, Uzbekistan
- Venue: Tashkent Tennis Center

Champions

Singles
- (Uzbekistan) Iroda Tulyaganova

Doubles
- (China) Li Na / (China) Li Ting
← 1999 ·	Tashkent Open	· 2001 →

The 2000 Tashkent Open was a women's tennis tournament played on hard courts at the Tashkent Tennis Center in Tashkent, Uzbekistan that was part of the Tier IVa category of the 2000 WTA Tour. It was the second edition of the tournament and was held from 12 June through 18 June 2000. Unseeded Iroda Tulyaganova won the singles title and earned $22,000 first-prize money.

== Finals ==
=== Singles ===
(Uzbekistan) Iroda Tulyaganova defeated (Italy) Francesca Schiavone, 6–3, 2–6, 6–3

- It was Tulyaganova's only singles title of the year and the first of her career.

=== Doubles ===
(China) Li Na / (China) Li Ting defeated (Uzbekistan) Iroda Tulyaganova / (Ukraine) Anna Zaporozhanova, 3–6, 6–2, 6–4
