= Ekaterina Paniouchkina =

Russian tennis player

Ekaterina Paniouchkina Екатерина Панюшкина
- Country (sports): Russia
- Born: 29 January 1981 (age 44); Moscow, RSFSR
- Retired: 2000
- Prize money: $5,263

Singles
- Career record: 11–19
- Highest ranking: No. 635 (20 December 1999)

Doubles
- Career record: 23–13
- Career titles: 3 ITF
- Highest ranking: No. 291 (11 October 1999)

Ekaterina Paniouchkina (Russian: Екатерина Панюшкина; born 29 January 1981) is a former professional tennis player from Russia.

Paniouchkina has career-high WTA rankings of 635 in singles, achieved on 20 December 1999, and 291 in doubles, set on 11 October 1999. She has 3 doubles titles on the ITF Women's Circuit.

In 1999 Her only WTA Tour main draw appearance came at the 1999 she partnered with Anastasia Rodionova in the doubles event. But first round lost German Julia Abe and Israeli Nataly Cahana.

== ITF Circuit finals ==
$100,000 tournaments
$75,000 tournaments
$50,000 tournaments
$25,000 tournaments
$10,000 tournaments

=== Doubles: 4 (3–1) ===
Outcome	No.	Date	Tournament	Surface	Partner	Opponents	Score
Winner	1.	1 November 1998	Minsk, Belarus	Carpet	(Australia) Anastasia Rodionova	(Belarus) Olga Glouschenko (Belarus) Tatiana Poutchek	7–5, 5–7, 6–3
Runner-up	2.	21 June 1999	Istanbul, Turkey	Hard	(Russia) Gulnara Fattakhetdinova	(Turkey) Duygu Akşit Oal (Turkey) Gülberk Gültekin	6–3, 2–6, 3–6
Winner	3.	9 August 1999	Istanbul, Turkey	Hard	(Belarus) Nadejda Ostrovskaya	(Armenia) Liudmila Nikoyan (Russia) Ekaterina Sysoeva	6–0, 6–2
Winner	4.	27 September 1999	Tbilisi, Georgia	Clay	(Russia) Maria Goloviznina	(Belarus) Nadejda Ostrovskaya (Russia) Ekaterina Sysoeva	6–0, 6–2
