= Laura Montalvo =

Argentine tennis player

- Country (sports): Argentina
- Born: 29 March 1976 (age 50) Buenos Aires, Argentina
- Height: 1.73 m (5 ft 8 in)
- Prize money: $389,178

Singles
- Career record: 143–76
- Career titles: 0 WTA, 8 ITF
- Highest ranking: No. 191 (19 June 1995)

Doubles
- Career record: 266–152
- Career titles: 9 WTA, 20 ITF
- Highest ranking: No. 23 (21 May 2001)

Grand Slam doubles results
- French Open: QF (2000)
- Wimbledon: QF (1998)
- US Open: 2R (1996, 1997, 2000, 2001)

Laura Montalvo (born 29 March 1976) is an Argentine former professional tennis player.

Montalvo won eight ITF singles titles and reached a career high of No. 191 in singles in June 1995. Her win–loss record for singles is 143–76, 266–152 for doubles. Being a "doubles specialist" on the WTA Tour, she reached the ranking of No. 23 in doubles in May 2001. She played on doubles teams with both Liezel Huber and Paola Suárez. With Huber, she reached the quarterfinals of the French Open in 2000. They regularly competed together in Grand Slam tournaments and tour events for the next two years. She also frequently partnered her countrywoman Suárez, including at the 2000 Sydney Olympics, where they lost in the second round. The pair won eight titles together, which make up all but one of Montalvo's total title haul in doubles.

== WTA career finals ==
=== Doubles (9–5) ===
Legend
Grand Slam tournaments (0)
WTA Tour Championships (0)
Tier I (0)
Tier II (0)
Tier III (2)
Tier IV & V (7)

Result	W-L	Date	Tournament	Surface	Partner	Opponents	Score
Win	1–0	Apr 1996	Bol, Croatia	Clay	(Argentina) Paola Suárez	(France) Alexia Dechaume (France) Alexandra Fusai	6–7, 6–3, 6–4
Win	2–0	Apr 1997	Bol, Croatia	Clay	(Slovakia) Henrieta Nagyová	(Argentina) María José Gaidano (Austria) Marion Maruska	6–3, 6–1
Win	3–0	Apr 1998	Bol, Croatia	Clay	(Argentina) Paola Suárez	(South Africa) Joannette Kruger (Croatia) Mirjana Lučić	w/o
Loss	3–1	Apr 1998	Budapest, Hungary	Clay	(Romania) Cătălina Cristea	(Spain) Virginia Ruano Pascual (Argentina) Paola Suárez	6–4, 1–6, 1–6
Win	4–1	Jul 1998	Maria Lankowitz, Austria	Clay	(Argentina) Paola Suárez	(Slovenia) Tina Križan (Slovenia) Katarina Srebotnik	6–1, 6–2
Loss	4–2	Feb 1999	Bogotá, Colombia	Clay	(Argentina) Paola Suárez	(Greece) Christína Papadáki (Netherlands) Seda Noorlander	4–6, 6–7^{(5)}
Loss	4–3	Apr 1999	Budapest, Hungary	Clay	(Spain) Virginia Ruano Pascual	(Russia) Evgenia Kulikovskaya (Federal Republic of Yugoslavia) Sandra Načuk	3–6, 4–6
Win	5–3	Jul 1999	Warsaw, Poland	Clay	(Argentina) Paola Suárez	(Spain) Gala León García (Spain) María Sánchez Lorenzo	6–4, 6–3
Loss	5–4	Jul 1999	Pörtschach, Austria	Clay	(Ukraine) Olga Lugina	(Italy) Silvia Farina (Slovakia) Karina Habšudová	4–6, 4–6
Win	6–4	Oct 1999	São Paulo, Brazil	Clay	(Argentina) Paola Suárez	(Slovakia) Janette Husárová (Argentina) Florencia Labat	6–7, 7–5, 7–5
Win	7–4	Feb 2000	Bogotá, Colombia	Clay	(Argentina) Paola Suárez	(Hungary) Rita Kuti-Kis (Hungary) Petra Mandula	6–4, 6–2
Win	8–4	Feb 2000	São Paulo, Brazil	Clay	(Argentina) Paola Suárez	(Slovakia) Janette Husárová (Argentina) Florencia Labat	5–7, 6–4, 6–3
Win	9–4	Jul 2000	Klagenfurt, Austria	Clay	(Argentina) Paola Suárez	(Austria) Barbara Schett (Switzerland) Patty Schnyder	6–4, 6–3
Loss	9–5	Feb 2001	Bogotá, Colombia	Clay	(Argentina) Paola Suárez	(Italy) Tathiana Garbin (Slovakia) Janette Husárová	4–6, 6–2, 4–6

== ITF Circuit finals ==
=== Singles (8–5) ===
$75,000 tournaments
$50,000 tournaments
$25,000 tournaments
$10,000 tournaments

Result	No.	Date	Tournament	Surface	Opponent	Score
Win	1.	26 April 1993	Santiago, Chile	Clay	(Argentina) María Fernanda Landa	6–4, 2–6, 6–3
Win	2.	7 June 1993	Plovdiv, Bulgaria	Clay	(Czechoslovakia) Monika Maštalířová	0–6, 6–4, 6–4
Loss	1.	28 June 1993	Supetar, Croatia	Clay	(Croatia) Ivona Horvat	6–0, 1–6, 4–6
Win	3.	5 July 1993	Bol, Croatia	Clay	(Bulgaria) Svetlana Krivencheva	6–0, 6–4
Win	4.	18 October 1993	Buenos Aires, Argentina	Clay	(Argentina) Mariana Díaz Oliva	6–2, 6–4
Win	5.	1 November 1993	Asuncion, Paraguay	Clay	(Argentina) Cintia Tortorella	6–3, 2–6, 6–4
Win	6.	14 November 1994	Buenos Aires, Argentina	Clay	(Argentina) María Fernanda Landa	6–2, 6–2
Loss	2.	6 November 1995	São Paulo, Brazil	Clay	(Argentina) Mariana Díaz Oliva	3–6, 1–6
Win	7.	15 December 1996	São Paulo, Brazil	Clay	(Australia) Renee Reid	6–2, 5–7, 6–2
Loss	3.	14 September 1997	La Paz, Bolivia	Clay	(Brazil) Vanessa Menga	3–6, 5–7
Loss	4.	21 September 1997	Santiago, Chile	Clay	(Brazil) Miriam D'Agostini	6–4, 2–6, 1–6
Loss	5.	28 September 1997	San Miguel de Tucumán, Argentina	Clay	(Argentina) Mariana Díaz Oliva	2–6, 7–6^{(3)}, 6–7^{(0)}
Win	8.	20 October 1997	Novo Hamburgo, Brazil	Clay	(Brazil) Vanessa Menga	6–3, 6–0

=== Doubles (20–12) ===
Result	No.	Date	Tournament	Surface	Partner	Opponents	Score
Loss	1.	14 October 1991	Buenos Aires, Argentina	Clay	(Argentina) Ilana Carreon	(Argentina) Vanessa Falter (Argentina) Mariana Randrup	4–6, 3–6
Win	1.	19 October 1992	Buenos Aires, Argentina	Clay	(Argentina) Mariana Randrup	(Argentina) Florencia Cianfagna (Argentina) María Fernanda Landa	6–3, 3–6, 6–3
Win	2.	3 May 1993	Buenos Aires, Argentina	Clay	(Argentina) Maria Inés Araiz	(Argentina) María Fernanda Landa (Argentina) Mariana Randrup	6–1, 3–6, 6–2
Win	3.	6 June 1993	Sofia, Bulgaria	Clay	(Argentina) Valentina Solari	(Bulgaria) Galia Angelova (Bulgaria) Teodora Nedeva	7–6^{(6)}, 2–6, 7–6^{(4)}
Win	4.	5 July 1993	Bol, Croatia	Clay	(Argentina) Valentina Solari	(Bulgaria) Svetlana Krivencheva (Croatia) Petra Rihtaric	3–6, 6–3, 7–5
Loss	2.	19 July 1993	Sezze, Italy	Clay	(Argentina) Valentina Solari	(Czech Republic) Ivana Jankovská (Czech Republic) Eva Melicharová	2–6, 5–7
Win	5.	18 October 1993	Buenos Aires, Argentina	Clay	(Argentina) Mariana Díaz Oliva	(Argentina) Valeria Strappa (Argentina) Veronica Stele	6–2, 5–7, 6–1
Win	6.	15 November 1993	La Plata, Argentina	Clay	(Argentina) Mercedes Paz	(Brazil) Cláudia Chabalgoity (Paraguay) Larissa Schaerer	6–1, 6–4
Win	7.	22 November 1993	Buenos Aires, Argentina	Clay	(Belgium) Vanessa Matthys	(Argentina) Veronica Stele (Argentina) Cintia Tortorella	6–3, 7–6^{(5)}
Win	8.	11 April 1994	Supetar, Croatia	Clay	(Argentina) María Fernanda Landa	(Bulgaria) Teodora Nedeva (Bulgaria) Antoaneta Pandjerova	6–4, 6–2
Loss	3.	13 June 1994	Sezze, Italy	Clay	(Spain) Silvia Ramón-Cortés	(Italy) Laura Garrone (Italy) Rita Grande	4–6, 4–6
Loss	4.	7 November 1994	Buenos Aires, Argentina	Clay	(South Africa) Nannie de Villiers	(Hungary) Virág Csurgó (Hungary) Petra Mandula	3–6, 3–6
Win	9.	14 November 1994	Buenos Aires, Argentina	Clay	(Argentina) Mercedes Paz	(Slovakia) Patrícia Marková (Japan) Yuka Tanaka	6–4, 6–3
Win	10.	5 June 1995	Novi Sad, Serbia	Clay	(Paraguay) Larissa Schaerer	(Serbia and Montenegro) Tatjana Ječmenica (Bulgaria) Antoaneta Pandjerova	5–7, 6–1, 6–1
Loss	5.	12 June 1995	Barcelona, Spain	Clay	(Spain) Silvia Ramón-Cortés	(Spain) Patricia Aznar (Spain) Eva Bes	3–6, 6–2, 4–6
Win	11.	23 September 1995	Sofia, Bulgaria	Clay	(Argentina) Geraldine Aizenberg	(Bulgaria) Lubomira Bacheva (Hungary) Réka Vidáts	6–2, 6–2
Loss	6.	6 November 1995	São Paulo, Brazil	Clay	(Argentina) Cintia Tortorella	(Hungary) Katalin Marosi (Brazil) Miriam D'Agostini	1–6, 6–1, 5–7
Win	12.	17 December 1995	San Miguel de Tucumán, Argentina	Clay	(Argentina) Paola Suárez	(Paraguay) Larissa Schaerer (Argentina) Veronica Stele	6–2, 7–6^{(4)}
Win	13.	11 February 1996	Mar del Plata, Argentina	Hard	(Argentina) Paola Suárez	(Austria) Marion Maruska (France) Noëlle van Lottum	6–3, 6–1
Win	14.	22 September 1996	Sofia, Bulgaria	Clay	(Czech Republic) Lenka Němečková	(Bulgaria) Teodora Nedeva (Bulgaria) Antoaneta Pandjerova	6–2, 6–0
Win	15.	1 December 1996	São Paulo, Brazil	Clay	(Brazil) Luciana Tella	(Brazil) Miriam D'Agostini (Brazil) Andrea Vieira	6–3, 6–4
Win	16.	8 December 1996	São Paulo, Brazil	Clay	(Brazil) Luciana Tella	(United States) Susie Starrett (United States) Paige Yaroshuk	2–6, 6–3, 7–5
Loss	7.	23 February 1997	Bogotá, Colombia	Clay	(Argentina) Mercedes Paz	(Netherlands) Seda Noorlander (Greece) Christína Papadáki	6–7, 6–4, 5–7
Loss	8.	8 September 1997	La Paz, Bolivia	Clay	(Argentina) Mariana Lopez Palacios	(Czech Republic) Monika Maštalířová (Mexico) Karin Palme	6–4, 3–6, 2–6
Loss	9.	11 November 1996	Santiago, Chile	Clay	(Argentina) Mariana Lopez Palacios	(Czech Republic) Monika Maštalířová (Switzerland) Aliénor Tricerri	4–6, 3–6
Win	17.	5 October 1997	Buenos Aires, Argentina	Clay	(Argentina) Mercedes Paz	(Argentina) Celeste Contín (Argentina) Romina Ottoboni	4–6, 6–2, 6–4
Win	18.	2 November 1997	Mogi das Cruzes, Brazil	Clay	(Argentina) Mercedes Paz	(Brazil) Miriam D'Agostini (Brazil) Vanessa Menga	6–2, 6–0
Loss	10.	27 September 1998	Tucuman, Argentina	Clay	(Argentina) Luciana Masante	(Argentina) Mercedes Paz (Argentina) Patricia Tarabini	7–5, 4–6, 6–7
Win	19.	5 October 1998	Santiago, Chile	Clay	(Argentina) Paola Suárez	(Brazil) Miriam D'Agostini (Hungary) Katalin Marosi	6–1, 6–2
Win	20.	19 October 1998	Montevideo, Uruguay	Clay	(Argentina) Paola Suárez	(Spain) Eva Bes (Argentina) María Fernanda Landa	6–2, 6–2
Loss	11.	7 December 1998	Cali, Colombia	Clay	(Spain) Alicia Ortuño	(Slovenia) Katarina Srebotnik (Slovakia) Zuzana Váleková	6–2, 3–6, 2–6
Loss	12.	13 September 1999	Buenos Aires, Argentina	Clay	(Argentina) Paola Suárez	(Argentina) Paula Racedo (Switzerland) Aliénor Tricerri	w/o
