= Sandra Načuk =

Serbian tennis player

Sandra Naćuk
- Country (sports): FR Yugoslavia; Serbia and Montenegro
- Born: 17 August 1980 (age 46) Novi Sad, SFR Yugoslavia
- Height: 1.70 m (5 ft 7 in)
- Turned pro: 1996
- Retired: 2004
- Plays: Right-handed (two-handed backhand)
- Prize money: $305,150

Singles
- Career record: 139–106
- Career titles: 0 WTA, 4 ITF
- Highest ranking: No. 81 (16 August 1999)

Grand Slam singles results
- Australian Open: 2R (2000, 2001)
- French Open: 1R (1999, 2000)
- Wimbledon: 3R (2000)
- US Open: 1R (1998, 1999, 2000)

Doubles
- Career record: 59–61
- Career titles: 1 WTA, 5 ITF
- Highest ranking: No. 74 (4 December 2000)

Grand Slam doubles results
- Australian Open: 1R (2000, 2001)
- French Open: 1R (2000, 2001)
- Wimbledon: 1R (2000, 2001)
- US Open: 1R (2000)

Sandra Naćuk (born 17 August 1980) is a former professional tennis player who played for Serbia and Montenegro. She reached her highest singles ranking of world No. 81 in August 1999.

Naćuk's career highlight was reaching the third round of the 2000 Wimbledon Championships singles tournament, defeating Jelena Kostanić and Lucie Ahl. She won one WTA Tour doubles title in her career, at Budapest in 1999, partnering with Eugenia Kulikovskaya. She also won her biggest ITF Women's Circuit singles title in 1998 at Poitiers. Naćuk was coached by Boris Bošnjaković.

== WTA career finals ==
=== Doubles: 3 (1–2) ===
Winner — Legend Tier I (0–0) Tier II (0–0) Tier III (0–0) Tier IV (1–2) Tier V (0–0)	Finals by surface Hard (0–0) Grass (0–0) Clay (1–2) Carpet (0–0)

Result	W/L	Date	Tournament	Surface	Partner	Opponents	Score
Win	1–0	Apr 1999	Budapest, Hungary	Clay	(Russia) Evgenia Kulikovskaya	(Argentina) Laura Montalvo (Spain) Virginia Ruano Pascual	6–3, 6–4
Loss	1–1	Aug 1999	Knokke-Heist, Belgium	Clay	(Russia) Evgenia Kulikovskaya	(Czech Republic) Eva Martincová (Germany) Elena Pampoulova	6–3, 3–6, 3–6
Loss	1–2	Apr 2000	Budapest, Hungary	Clay	(Croatia) Jelena Kostanić	(Bulgaria) Lubomira Bacheva (Spain) Cristina Torrens Valero	0–6, 2–6

== ITF finals ==
=== Singles (4–1) ===
Legend $75,000 tournaments $50,000 tournaments $25,000 tournaments $10,000 tournaments	Finals by surface Hard (2–1) Clay (2–0) Grass (0–0) Carpet (0–0)

Result	No.	Date	Tournament	Surface	Opponent	Score
Win	1.	11 August 1996	Rebecq, Belgium	Clay	(France) Virginie Massart	6–1, 2–6, 6–0
Win	2.	15 September 1996	Albena, Bulgaria	Clay	(Romania) Alina Tecsor	7–5, 7–6
Loss	1.	2 November 1997	Edinburgh, Scotland	Hard (i)	(Austria) Barbara Schwartz	6–3, 3–6, 4–6
Win	3.	21 February 1998	Redbridge, England	Hard (i)	(United Kingdom) Lorna Woodroffe	6–4, 6–3
Win	4.	1 November 1998	Poitiers, France	Hard (i)	(Russia) Elena Makarova	6–0, 5–7, 6–1

=== Doubles (5–4) ===
Legend $75,000 tournaments $50,000 tournaments $25,000 tournaments $10,000 tournaments	Finals by surface Hard (0–1) Clay (5–2) Grass (0–0) Carpet (0–1)

Result	No.	Date	Tournament	Surface	Partner	Opponents	Score
Win	1.	20 April 1997	Bari, Italy	Clay	(Federal Republic of Yugoslavia) Dragana Zarić	(Israel) Tzipi Obziler (Israel) Anna Smashnova	6–4, 6–2
Win	2.	31 August 1997	Athens, Greece	Clay	(Russia) Evgenia Kulikovskaya	(Spain) Rosa María Andrés Rodríguez (Spain) Marina Escobar	6–4, 6–3
Loss	1.	21 September 1997	Sofia, Bulgaria	Clay	(Federal Republic of Yugoslavia) Dragana Zarić	(Germany) Sandra Klösel (Austria) Karin Kschwendt	4–6, 4–6
Loss	2.	19 October 1997	Southampton, England	Carpet (i)	(Czech Republic) Lenka Cenková	(United Kingdom) Julie Pullin (United Kingdom) Lorna Woodroffe	2–6, 1–6
Win	3.	16 September 2001	Bordeaux, France	Clay	(Federal Republic of Yugoslavia) Dragana Zarić	(Spain) Conchita Martínez Granados (Italy) Antonella Serra Zanetti	6–2, 7–6^{(8–6)}
Loss	3.	4 November 2001	Bolton, England	Hard (i)	(Federal Republic of Yugoslavia) Dragana Zarić	(Russia) Maria Goloviznina (Morocco) Bahia Mouhtassine	4–6, 3–6
Win	4.	2 June 2002	Mostar, Bosnia and Herzegovina	Clay	(Slovenia) Tina Hergold	(Federal Republic of Yugoslavia) Katarina Dašković (Hungary) Katalin Marosi	6–3, 6–3
Loss	4.	16 June 2002	Grado, Italy	Clay	(Madagascar) Natacha Randriantefy	(Italy) Gloria Pizzichini (Czech Republic) Hana Šromová	3–6, 5–7
Win	5.	23 June 2002	Gorizia, Italy	Clay	(Slovenia) Tina Hergold	(Spain) Arantxa Parra Santonja (Brazil) Carla Tiene	6–4, 6–3
