= Martina Hingis career statistics =

Career finals
Discipline	Type	Won	Lost	Total	WR (Note: Winning rate)
Singles	Grand Slam	5	7	12	0.42
Singles	Summer Olympics	–	–	–	–
Singles	WTA Finals (Note: Formerly known as: Virginia Slims Championships (until 1995); WTA Tour Championships (until 2014))	2	2	4	0.50
Singles	WTA 1000 (Note: Formerly known as: Category 4 & 5 & 6 (until 1990); Tier I (until 2009); WTA Premier Mandatory and 5 (until 2021))	17	10	27	0.63
Singles	WTA 500 (Note: Formerly known as: Category 3 (until 1990); Tier II (until 2009); WTA Premier (until 2021))	16	5	22 (Note: Hingis reached 22 finals in 2000 but the 2000 State Farm Women's Tennis Classic was cancelled due to rain.)	0.76
Singles	WTA 250 (Note: Formerly known as: Category 1 & 2 (until 1990); Tier III & IV & V (until 2009); WTA International (until 2021))	3	1	4	0.75
Singles	Total	43	25	69	0.63
Doubles	Grand Slam	13	3	16	0.81
Doubles	Summer Olympics	0	1	1	0.00
Doubles	WTA Finals	3	0	3	1.00
Doubles	WTA 1000	26	9	35	0.74
Doubles	WTA 500	20	8	28	0.71
Doubles	WTA 250	2	1	3	0.67
Doubles	Total	64	22	86	0.74
Mixed doubles	Grand Slam	7	0	7	1.00
Mixed doubles	Total	7	0	7	1.00
Total		114	47	162	0.71

This is a list of the main career statistics of Swiss former professional tennis player Martina Hingis whose career ran from 1994 until her final retirement in 2017. During her career, she has won Grand Slam tournaments in all three disciplines (singles – 5, doubles – 13 & mixed doubles – 7). In addition, she achieved winning the Australian Open three times in a row in both singles and doubles (from 1997 to 1999). After winning the doubles title at Wimbledon in 1996, she became the youngest player to win a Grand Slam title at senior level. She also won five times at the WTA Finals (singles – 2 & doubles – 3). Among her other titles, she has more than 40 WTA titles and has 114 overall (singles – 43, doubles – 64 & mixed doubles – 7). She is one of the few players that achieved the world No. 1 ranking in both singles and doubles on the WTA tour. By reaching world No. 1 in doubles in 1998, she become the youngest-ever doubles No.1. That same year, she won the Calendar Year Grand Slam in doubles.

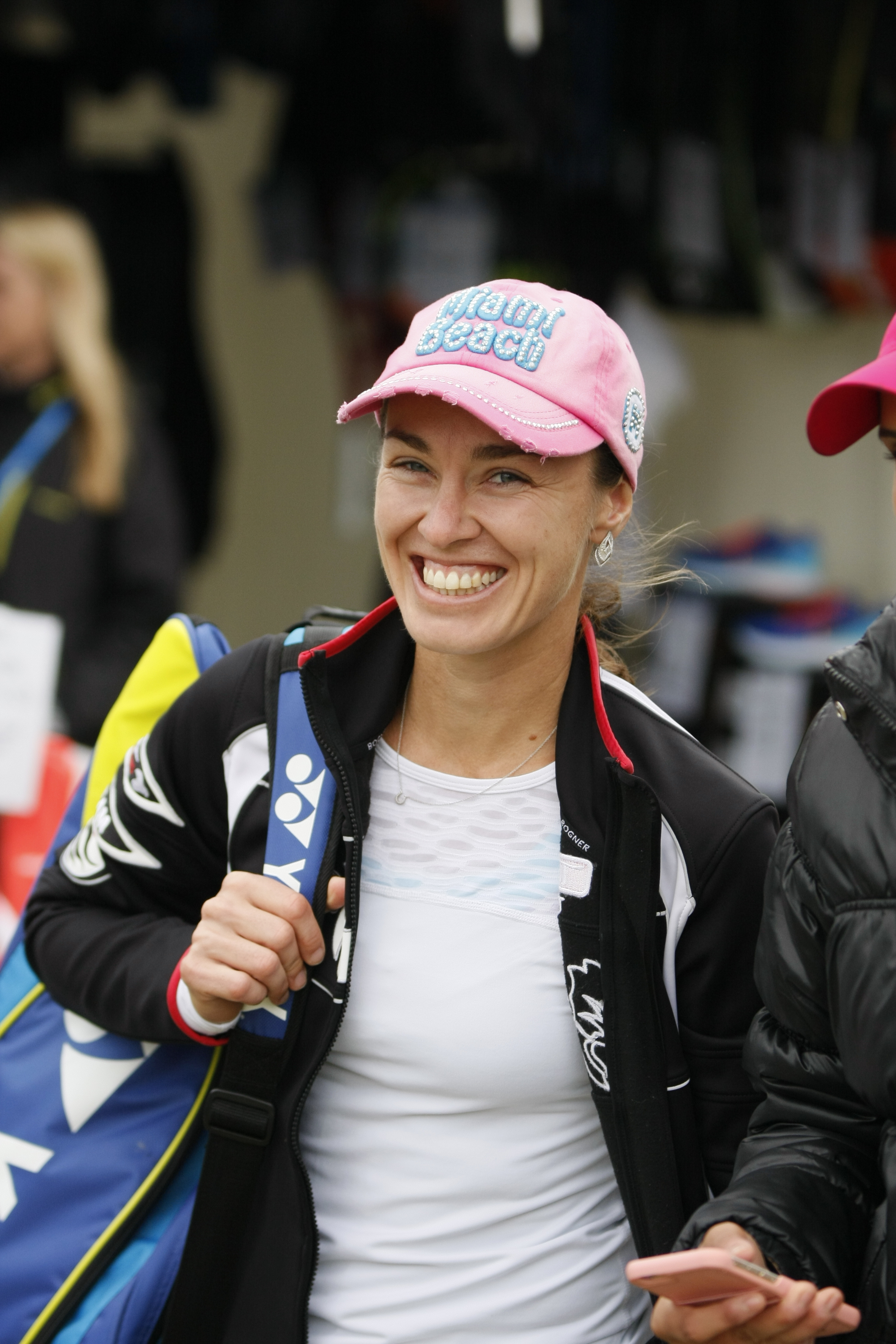
Hingis in 2015.

== Performance timelines ==
Key
W	F	SF	QF	#R	RR	Q#	P#	DNQ	A	Z#	PO	G	S	B	NMS	NTI	P	NH

(W) winner; (F) finalist; (SF) semifinalist; (QF) quarterfinalist; (#R) rounds 4, 3, 2, 1; (RR) round-robin stage; (Q#) qualification round; (P#) preliminary round; (DNQ) did not qualify; (A) absent; (Z#) Davis/Fed Cup Zonal Group (with number indication) or (PO) play-off; (G) gold, (S) silver or (B) bronze Olympic/Paralympic medal; (NMS) not a Masters tournament; (NTI) not a Tier I tournament; (P) postponed; (NH) not held; (SR) strike rate (events won / competed); (W–L) win–loss record.

=== Singles ===
Tournament	1994	1995	1996	1997	1998	1999	2000	2001	2002	...	2005	2006	2007	...	2015	2016	2017	SR	W–L	Win %
Grand Slam tournaments
Australian Open	A	2R	QF	W	W	W	F	F	F		A	QF	QF		A	A	A	3 / 10	52–7	88%
French Open	A	3R	3R	F	SF	F	SF	SF	A		A	QF	A		A	A	A	0 / 8	35–8	81%
Wimbledon	A	1R	4R	W	SF	1R	QF	1R	A		A	3R	3R		A	A	A	1 / 9	23–8	74%
US Open	A	4R	SF	W	F	F	SF	SF	4R		A	2R	3R		A	A	A	1 / 10	43–9	83%
Win–loss	0–0	6–4	14–4	27–1	23–3	19–3	20–4	16–4	9–2		0–0	11–4	8–3		0–0	0–0	0–0	5 / 37	153–32	83%
Year-end championships
WTA Finals	DNQ		F	QF	W	F	W	A	A		DNQ	RR	A		did not qualify			2 / 6	16–5	76%
Grand Slam Cup	not held				SF	SF	not held								not held			0 / 2	2–2	50%
National representation
Olympic Games	not held		2R	not held			A	not held			not held				NH	A	NH	0 / 1	1–1	50%
Fed Cup	A	Z1	PO2	PO	F	A	A	A	A		A	A	A		PO	SF	SF	0 / 3	18–4	82%
WTA 1000 tournaments + former
Indian Wells Open	not tier I		A	A	W	QF	F	SF	F		A	SF	4R		A	A	A	1 / 7	27–6	82%
Miami Open	A	A	2R	W	SF	SF	W	SF	QF		A	3R	3R		A	A	A	2 / 9	29–7	81%
Berlin / Madrid Open^{1}	A	2R	2R	A	QF	W	SF	SF	A		A	QF	3R		A	A	A	1 / 8	19–7	73%
Italian Open	A	A	F	A	W	SF	A	SF	A		A	W	A		A	A	A	2 / 5	21–3	88%
Canadian Open	A	3R	A	A	SF	W	W	A	QF		A	F	A		A	A	A	2 / 6	21–4	84%
Pan Pacific / Wuhan Open^{2}	A	A	SF	W	F	W	W	F	W		A	F	W		A	A	A	5 / 9	32–4	89%
Charleston Open^{3}	A	A	2R	W	A	W	A	F	A		A	A	A		Premier			2 / 4	15–2	88%
Southern California Open^{3}	Tier II										A	QF	3R		125K	not held		0 / 2	3–2	60%
Kremlin Cup^{3}	not held		NT1	A	A	A	W	QF	1R		A	A	A		Premier			1 / 3	5–2	71%
Zurich Open^{3}	2R	2R	F	QF	A	F	W	A	A		A	QF	A		not held			1 / 7	16–6	73%
Philadelphia Championships^{3}	A	2R	Tier II					not held			T II	not held			not held			0 / 1	1–1	50%
Win–loss	1–1	5–4	13–6	15–1	22–4	31–4	31–2	22–7	14–4		0–0	26–7	9–4		0–0	0–0	0–0	17 / 61	189–44	81%
Career statistics
	1994	1995	1996	1997	1998	1999	2000	2001	2002	...	2005	2006	2007	...	2015	2016	2017	SR	W–L	Win%
Tournaments	3	12	18	17	18	20	20	18	12		1	20	14		0 (Note: During the season, she did not play in the main draw of any tour-level tournaments. However, she played at the Billie Jean King Cup, which is not counted as a played tournament but matches count.)	0	0	Career total: 173		
Titles	0	0	2	12	5	7	9	3	2		0	2	1		0	0	0	Career total: 43		
Finals	0	1	5	13	8	13	13	6	4		0	4	2		0	0	0	Career total: 69		
Hardcourt win–loss	5–3	12–9	37–10	60–4	44–10	55–10	58–7	47–9	32–9		0–1	37–15	21–11		0–2	0–0	0–0	34 / 130	408–100	80%
Clay win–loss	0–0	9–4	15–5	11–1	18–2	19–2	12–2	17–5	2–1		0–0	14–3	1–1		0–0	0–0	0–0	7 / 33	118–26	82%
Grass win–loss	0–0	0–1	3–1	7–0	5–1	0–1	7–1	0–1	0–0		0–0	2–1	2–1		0–0	0–0	0–0	2 / 10	26–8	76%
Overall win–loss^{4}	5–3	21–14	55–16	78–5	67–13	74–13	77–10	64–15	34–10		0–1	53–19	24–13		0–2	0–0	0–0	43 / 173	552–134	80%
Win %	63%	60%	77%	94%	82%	85%	89%	80%	77%		0%	74%	65%		0%	0%	0%	Career total: 80%		
Year-end ranking	87	16	6	1	2	1	1	4	10		n/a	7	19		n/a	n/a	n/a	$24,749,074		

=== Doubles ===
Tournament	1994	1995	1996	1997	1998	1999	2000	2001	2002	...	2006	2007	...	2013	2014	2015	2016	2017	SR	W–L	Win %
Grand Slam tournaments
Australian Open	A	1R	1R	W	W	W	F	SF	W		A	2R		A	A	3R	W	2R	5 / 12	43–7	88%
French Open	A	A	QF	SF	W	F	W	A	A		A	A		A	A	QF	3R	SF	2 / 8	33–6	85%
Wimbledon	A	2R	W	QF	W	A	2R	A	A		A	A		A	1R	W	QF	QF	3 / 9	29–6	83%
US Open	A	3R	SF	SF	W	A	3R	QF	QF		A	3R		1R	F	W	SF	W	3 / 13	47–9	84%
Win–loss	0–0	3–3	13–3	17–3	24–0	11–1	14–2	7–2	9–1		0–0	3–2		0–1	5–2	17–2	15–3	14–3	13 / 42	152–28	84%
Year-end championship
WTA Finals	A	A	QF	QF	QF	W	W	A	A		A	A		A	A	W	SF	SF	3 / 8	13–5	72%
National representation
Olympic Games	not held		QF	not held			A	not held			not held			not held			S	NH	0 / 2	6–2	75%
Fed Cup	A	Z1	Z1	PO	F	A	A	A	A		A	A		A	A	PO	SF	SF	0 / 3	11–3	79%
WTA 1000 tournaments + former
Dubai / Qatar Open^{5}	not held							Premier			Premier			A	A	2R	QF	QF	0 / 3	2–3	33%
Indian Wells Open	A	A	A	A	SF	W	SF	A	A		A	A		A	1R	W	2R	W	3 / 7	25–4	86%
Miami Open	A	A	3R	SF	W	W	A	A	A		A	SF		A	W	W	2R	SF	4 / 9	34–5	87%
Berlin / Madrid Open^{1}	A	1R	F	A	A	A	A	A	A		A	A		A	2R	QF	F	W	1 / 4	10–3	77%
Italian Open	A	A	F	A	A	W	A	A	A		A	A		A	1R	F	W	W	3 / 6	21–3	88%
Canadian Open	A	F	A	A	W	A	W	A	A		A	A		2R	QF	SF	QF	QF	2 / 8	19–6	81%
Cincinnati Open	not held										Tier III			2R	1R	SF	F	W	1 / 5	10–4	71%
Pan Pacific / Wuhan Open^{2}	A	A	QF	F	W	F	W	A	A		A	A		A	W	W	2R	W	5 / 9	27–4	83%
China Open	Tier IV			not held							A	A		A	2R	W	2R	W	2 / 4	10–2	83%
Charleston Open^{3}	A	A	1R	W	A	A	A	A	A		A	A		Premier					1 / 2	4–1	80%
Kremlin Cup^{3}	not held		NT1	A	A	A	F	W	A		A	A		Premier					1 / 2	7–1	88%
Zurich Open^{3}	A	1R	W	W	A	A	W	A	A		A	A		not held					3 / 4	12–1	92%
Philadelphia Championships^{3}	A	1R	Tier II					not held			not held			not held					0 / 1	0–1	0%
Career Statistics
	1994	1995	1996	1997	1998	1999	2000	2001	2002	...	2006	2007	...	2013	2014	2015	2016	2017	SR	W–L	Win %
Tournaments	1	9	17	16	13	9	15	6	5		1	6		5	14	22	21	20	180		
Titles	0	1	2	8	9	6	7	1	2		–	1		–	3	10	5	9	64		
Finals	–	2	6	10	10	8	10	2	3		–	1		–	5	11	8	10	86		
Hardcourt win–loss	0–0	6–4	12–6	25–3	31–1	16–1	28–6	14–5	14–3		2–1	11–5		3–5	23–7	43–7	37–11	36–9	37 / 113	301–74	80%
Clay win–loss	0–0	4–1	12–5	8–1	9–1	9–1	6–0	0–0	4–0		0–0	0–0		0–0	1–2	11–4	13–3	12–1	10 / 29	89–19	82%
Grass win–loss	0–0	1–1	6–0	3–1	6–0	4–0	1–1	0–0	0–0		0–0	0–0		0–0	3–2	8–1	4–2	10–1	6 / 15	46–9	84%
Carpet win–loss	0–1	0–2	6–4	15–3	6–2	6–1	14–1	4–0	0–0		0–0	0–0	Discontinued						11 / 23	51–14	78%
Overall win–loss^{4}	0–1	11–8	36–15	51–8	52–4	35–3	49–8	18–5	18–3		2–1	11–5		3–5	27–11	62–12	54–16	58–11	64 / 180	487–116	81%
Win %	0%	58%	71%	86%	93%	92%	86%	78%	86%		67%	69%		38%	71%	84%	77%	81%	81%		
Year-end ranking	–	29	10	3	2	2	3	30	15		–	64		186	11	2	4	1			

=== Mixed doubles ===
Tournament	1996	1997	...	2000	...	2006	...	2013	2014	2015	2016	2017	SR	W–L
Australian Open	A	A		A		W		A	A	W	QF	QF	2 / 4	14–2
French Open	QF	A		A		2R		A	A	2R	W	1R	1 / 5	9–3
Wimbledon	2R	QF		A		A		A	QF	W	3R	W	2 / 6	17–4
US Open	SF	A		QF		A		1R	A	W	2R	W	2 / 6	14–3
Win–loss	6–3	3–1		2–0		6–0		0–1	2–1	14–1	9–3	12–2	7 / 21	54–12

Notes

- ^{1} In 2009, the WTA German Open was abolished and replaced by the Madrid Open.
- ^{2} In 2014, the Pan Pacific Open was downgraded to a Premier event and replaced by the Wuhan Open.
- ^{3} The WTA 1000 category was previously known as Premier Mandatory & Premier 5 (until 2021), and before that as Tier I (until 2009). This note covers tournaments that have since been downgraded to a lower category or are no longer held.
- ^{4} Only main-draw results in WTA Tour, Grand Slam tournaments, Billie Jean King Cup (Fed Cup), United Cup, Hopman Cup and Olympic Games are included in win–loss records.
- ^{5} The first Premier 5 event of the year has switched back and forth between the Dubai Tennis Championships and the Qatar Open since 2009. Dubai was classified as a Premier 5 event from 2009 to 2011 before being succeeded by Doha for the 2012–2014 period.

== Grand Slam tournament finals ==
=== Singles: 12 (5 titles, 7 runner-ups) ===
Result	Year	Tournament	Surface	Opponent	Score
Win	1997	Australian Open	Hard	(France) Mary Pierce	6–2, 6–2
Loss	1997	French Open	Clay	(Croatia) Iva Majoli	4–6, 2–6
Win	1997	Wimbledon	Grass	(Czech Republic) Jana Novotná	2–6, 6–3, 6–3
Win	1997	US Open	Hard	(United States) Venus Williams	6–0, 6–4
Win	1998	Australian Open (2)	Hard	(Spain) Conchita Martínez	6–3, 6–3
Loss	1998	US Open	Hard	(United States) Lindsay Davenport	3–6, 5–7
Win	1999	Australian Open (3)	Hard	(France) Amélie Mauresmo	6–2, 6–3
Loss	1999	French Open	Clay	(Germany) Steffi Graf	6–4, 5–7, 2–6
Loss	1999	US Open	Hard	(United States) Serena Williams	3–6, 6–7^{(4–7)}
Loss	2000	Australian Open	Hard	(United States) Lindsay Davenport	1–6, 5–7
Loss	2001	Australian Open	Hard	(United States) Jennifer Capriati	4–6, 3–6
Loss	2002	Australian Open	Hard	(United States) Jennifer Capriati	6–4, 6–7^{(7–9)}, 2–6

=== Doubles: 16 (13 titles, 3 runner-ups) ===
By winning the 1998 US Open title, Hingis completed the doubles Career Grand Slam. She became the 17th female player in history to achieve this.

Result	Year	Tournament	Surface	Partner	Opponents	Score
Win	1996	Wimbledon	Grass	(Czech Republic) Helena Suková	(United States) Meredith McGrath (Latvia) Larisa Savchenko Neiland	5–7, 7–5, 6–1
Win	1997	Australian Open	Hard	(Belarus) Natasha Zvereva	(United States) Lindsay Davenport (United States) Lisa Raymond	6–2, 6–2
Win	1998	Australian Open (2)	Hard	(Croatia) Mirjana Lučić	(United States) Lindsay Davenport (Belarus) Natasha Zvereva	6–4, 2–6, 6–3
Win	1998	French Open	Clay	(Czechoslovakia) Jana Novotná	(United States) Lindsay Davenport (Belarus) Natasha Zvereva	6–1, 7–6^{(7–4)}
Win	1998	Wimbledon (2)	Grass	(Czechoslovakia) Jana Novotná	(United States) Lindsay Davenport (Belarus) Natasha Zvereva	6–3, 3–6, 8–6
Win	1998	US Open	Hard	(Czechoslovakia) Jana Novotná	(United States) Lindsay Davenport (Belarus) Natasha Zvereva	6–3, 6–3
Win	1999	Australian Open (3)	Hard	(Russia) Anna Kournikova	(United States) Lindsay Davenport (Belarus) Natasha Zvereva	7–5, 6–3
Loss	1999	French Open	Clay	(Russia) Anna Kournikova	(United States) Serena Williams (United States) Venus Williams	3–6, 7–6^{(7–2)}, 6–8
Loss	2000	Australian Open	Hard	(France) Mary Pierce	(United States) Lisa Raymond (Australia) Rennae Stubbs	4–6, 7–5, 4–6
Win	2000	French Open (2)	Clay	(France) Mary Pierce	(Spain) Virginia Ruano Pascual (Argentina) Paola Suárez	6–2, 6–4
Win	2002	Australian Open (4)	Hard	(Russia) Anna Kournikova	(Slovakia) Daniela Hantuchová (Spain) Arantxa Sánchez Vicario	6–2, 6–7^{(4–7)}, 6–1
Loss	2014	US Open	Hard	(Italy) Flavia Pennetta	(Russia) Ekaterina Makarova (Russia) Elena Vesnina	6–2, 3–6, 2–6
Win	2015	Wimbledon (3)	Grass	(India) Sania Mirza	(Russia) Ekaterina Makarova (Russia) Elena Vesnina	5–7, 7–6^{(7–4)}, 7–5
Win	2015	US Open (2)	Hard	(India) Sania Mirza	(Australia) Casey Dellacqua (Kazakhstan) Yaroslava Shvedova	6–3, 6–3
Win	2016	Australian Open (5)	Hard	(India) Sania Mirza	(Czech Republic) Andrea Hlaváčková (Czech Republic) Lucie Hradecká	7–6^{(7–1)}, 6–3
Win	2017	US Open (3)	Hard	(Chinese Taipei) Chan Yung-jan	(Czech Republic) Lucie Hradecká (Czech Republic) Kateřina Siniaková	6–3, 6–2

=== Mixed doubles: 7 titles ===
By winning the 2016 French Open title, Hingis completed the mixed doubles Career Grand Slam. She became the 7th female player in history to achieve this.

Result	Year	Tournament	Surface	Partner	Opponents	Score
Win	2006	Australian Open	Hard	(India) Mahesh Bhupathi	(Russia) Elena Likhovtseva (Canada) Daniel Nestor	6–3, 6–3
Win	2015	Australian Open (2)	Hard	(India) Leander Paes	(France) Kristina Mladenovic (Canada) Daniel Nestor	6–4, 6–3
Win	2015	Wimbledon	Grass	(India) Leander Paes	(Hungary) Tímea Babos (Austria) Alexander Peya	6–1, 6–1
Win	2015	US Open	Hard	(India) Leander Paes	(United States) Bethanie Mattek-Sands (United States) Sam Querrey	6–4, 3–6, [10–7]
Win	2016	French Open	Clay	(India) Leander Paes	(India) Sania Mirza (Croatia) Ivan Dodig	4–6, 6–4, [10–8]
Win	2017	Wimbledon (2)	Grass	(United Kingdom) Jamie Murray	(United Kingdom) Heather Watson (Finland) Henri Kontinen	6–4, 6–4
Win	2017	US Open (2)	Hard	(United Kingdom) Jamie Murray	(Chinese Taipei) Chan Hao-ching (New Zealand) Michael Venus	6–1, 4–6, [10–8]

== Other significant finals ==
=== WTA Finals ===
==== Singles: 4 (2 titles, 2 runner-ups) ====
Result	Year	Tournament	Surface	Opponent	Score
Loss	1996	WTA Tour Championships, United States	Carpet (i)	(Germany) Steffi Graf	3–6, 6–4, 0–6, 6–4, 0–6
Win	1998	WTA Tour Championships, United States	Carpet (i)	(United States) Lindsay Davenport	7–5, 6–4, 4–6, 6–2
Loss	1999	WTA Tour Championships, United States	Carpet (i)	(United States) Lindsay Davenport	4–6, 2–6
Win	2000	WTA Tour Championships, United States	Carpet (i)	(United States) Monica Seles	6–7^{(5–7)}, 6–4, 6–4

==== Doubles: 3 titles ====
Result	Year	Tournament	Surface	Partner	Opponent	Score
Win	1999	WTA Tour Championships, United States	Carpet (i)	(Russia) Anna Kournikova	(Spain) Arantxa Sánchez Vicario (Latvia) Larisa Neiland	6–4, 6–4
Win	2000	WTA Tour Championships, United States	Carpet (i)	(Russia) Anna Kournikova	(United States) Nicole Arendt; (Netherlands) Manon Bollegraf	6–2, 6–3
Win	2015	WTA Finals, Singapore	Hard (i)	(India) Sania Mirza	(Spain) Garbiñe Muguruza (Spain) Carla Suárez Navarro	6–0, 6–3

=== WTA 1000 tournaments ===
==== Singles: 27 (17 titles, 10 runner-ups) ====
Result	Year	Tournament	Surface	Opponent	Score
Loss	1996	Italian Open	Clay	(Spain) Conchita Martínez	2–6, 3–6
Loss	1996	Zürich Open	Carpet (i)	(Czech Republic) Jana Novotná	2–6, 2–6
Win	1997	Pan Pacific Open	Carpet (i)	(Germany) Steffi Graf	walkover
Win	1997	Miami Open	Hard	(United States) Monica Seles	6–2, 6–1
Win	1997	Charleston Open	Clay	(United States) Monica Seles	3–6, 6–3, 7–6^{(7–5)}
Loss	1998	Pan Pacific Open	Carpet (i)	(United States) Lindsay Davenport	3–6, 3–6
Win	1998	Indian Wells Open	Hard	(United States) Lindsay Davenport	6–3, 6–4
Win	1998	Italian Open	Clay	(United States) Venus Williams	6–3, 2–6, 6–3
Win	1999	Pan Pacific Open	Carpet (i)	(South Africa) Amanda Coetzer	6–2, 6–1
Win	1999	Charleston Open	Clay	(Russia) Anna Kournikova	6–4, 6–3
Win	1999	Berlin Open	Clay	(France) Julie Halard-Decugis	6–0, 6–1
Win	1999	Canadian Open	Hard	(United States) Monica Seles	6–4, 6–4
Loss	1999	Zürich Open	Hard	(United States) Venus Williams	3–6, 4–6
Win	2000	Pan Pacific Open	Carpet (i)	(France) Sandrine Testud	6–3, 7–5
Loss	2000	Indian Wells Open	Hard	(United States) Lindsay Davenport	6–4, 4–6, 0–6
Win	2000	Miami Open	Hard	(United States) Lindsay Davenport	6–3, 6–2
Win	2000	Canadian Open	Hard	(United States) Serena Williams	0–6, 6–3, 3–0 ret.
Win	2000	Zürich Open	Hard	(United States) Lindsay Davenport	6–4, 4–6, 7–5
Win	2000	Kremlin Cup	Carpet (i)	(Russia) Anna Kournikova	6–3, 6–1
Loss	2001	Pan Pacific Open	Carpet (i)	(United States) Lindsay Davenport	7–6^{(7–4)}, 4–6, 2–6
Loss	2001	Charleston Open	Clay	(United States) Jennifer Capriati	0–6, 6–4, 4–6
Win	2002	Pan Pacific Open	Carpet (i)	(United States) Monica Seles	7–6^{(8–6)}, 4–6, 6–3
Loss	2002	Indian Wells Open	Hard	(Slovakia) Daniela Hantuchová	3–6, 4–6
Loss	2006	Pan Pacific Open	Carpet (i)	(Russia) Elena Dementieva	2–6, 0–6
Win	2006	Italian Open	Clay	(Russia) Dinara Safina	6–2, 7–5
Loss	2006	Canadian Open	Hard	(Serbia) Ana Ivanovic	2–6, 3–6
Win	2007	Pan Pacific Open	Carpet (i)	(Serbia) Ana Ivanovic	6–4, 6–2

==== Doubles: 35 (26 titles, 9 runner-ups) ====
Result	Year	Tournament	Surface	Partner	Opponents	Score
Loss	1995	Canadian Open	Hard	(Croatia) Iva Majoli	(Argentina) Gabriela Sabatini; (Netherlands) Brenda Schultz-McCarthy	6–4, 0–6, 3–6
Loss	1996	Italian Open	Clay	(United States) Gigi Fernández	(Spain) Arantxa Sánchez Vicario; (Romania) Irina Spîrlea	4–6, 6–3, 3–6
Loss	1996	Berlin Open	Clay	(Czech Republic) Helena Suková	(United States) Meredith McGrath; (Latvia) Larisa Neiland	1–6, 7–5, 6–7^{(4–7)}
Win	1996	Zürich Open	Carpet (i)	(Czech Republic) Helena Suková	(United States) Nicole Arendt; (Belarus) Natasha Zvereva	7–5, 6–4
Loss	1997	Pan Pacific Open	Carpet (i)	(United States) Gigi Fernández	(United States) Lindsay Davenport (Belarus) Natasha Zvereva	6–4, 6–3
Win	1997	Charleston Open	Clay	(United States) Mary Joe Fernández	(United States) Lindsay Davenport (Czech Republic) Jana Novotná	7–5, 4–6, 6–1
Win	1997	Zürich Open (2)	Carpet (i)	(Spain) Arantxa Sánchez Vicario	(Latvia) Larisa Neiland (Czech Republic) Helena Suková	4–6, 6–4, 6–1
Win	1998	Pan Pacific Open	Carpet (i)	(Croatia) Mirjana Lučić	(United States) Lindsay Davenport (Belarus) Natasha Zvereva	7–5, 6–4
Win	1998	Miami Open	Hard	(Czech Republic) Jana Novotná	(Spain) Arantxa Sánchez Vicario (Belarus) Natasha Zvereva	6–2, 3–6, 6–3
Win	1998	Canadian Open	Hard	(Czech Republic) Jana Novotná	(Indonesia) Yayuk Basuki; (Netherlands) Caroline Vis	6–3, 6–4
Loss	1999	Pan Pacific Open	Carpet (i)	(Czech Republic) Jana Novotná	(United States) Lindsay Davenport (Belarus) Natasha Zvereva	2–6, 3–6
Win	1999	Indian Wells Open	Hard	(Russia) Anna Kournikova	(United States) Mary Joe Fernández (Czech Republic) Jana Novotná	6–2, 6–2
Win	1999	Miami Open (2)	Hard	(Czech Republic) Jana Novotná	(United States) Mary Joe Fernández (United States) Monica Seles	0–6, 6–4, 7–6^{(7–1)}
Win	1999	Italian Open	Clay	(Russia) Anna Kournikova	(France) Alexandra Fusai; (France) Nathalie Tauziat	6–4, 6–1
Win	2000	Pan Pacific Open (2)	Carpet (i)	(France) Mary Pierce	(France) Alexandra Fusai (France) Nathalie Tauziat	6–4, 6–1
Win	2000	Canadian Open	Hard	(France) Nathalie Tauziat	(France) Julie Halard-Decugis; (Japan) Ai Sugiyama	6–3, 3–6, 6–4
Win	2000	Zürich Open (3)	Hard (i)	(Russia) Anna Kournikova	(United States) Kimberly Po; (France) Anne-Gaëlle Sidot	6–3, 6–4
Loss	2000	Kremlin Cup	Carpet (i)	(Russia) Anna Kournikova	(France) Julie Halard-Decugis (Japan) Ai Sugiyama	6–4, 4–6, 6–7^{(5–7)}
Win	2001	Kremlin Cup	Carpet (i)	(Russia) Anna Kournikova	(Russia) Elena Dementieva; (Russia) Lina Krasnoroutskaya	7–6^{(7–1)}, 6–3
Win	2014	Miami Open (3)	Hard	(Germany) Sabine Lisicki	(Russia) Ekaterina Makarova; (Russia) Elena Vesnina	4–6, 6–4, [10–5]
Win	2014	Wuhan Open	Hard	(Italy) Flavia Pennetta	(Zimbabwe) Cara Black; (France) Caroline Garcia	6–4, 5–7, [12–10]
Win	2015	Indian Wells Open (2)	Hard	(India) Sania Mirza	(Russia) Ekaterina Makarova (Russia) Elena Vesnina	6–3, 6–4
Win	2015	Miami Open (4)	Hard	(India) Sania Mirza	(Russia) Ekaterina Makarova (Russia) Elena Vesnina	7–5, 6–1
Loss	2015	Italian Open	Clay	(India) Sania Mirza	(Hungary) Tímea Babos (France) Kristina Mladenovic	4–6, 3–6
Win	2015	Wuhan Open (2)	Hard	(India) Sania Mirza	(Romania) Irina-Camelia Begu (Romania) Monica Niculescu	6–2, 6–3
Win	2015	China Open	Hard	(India) Sania Mirza	(Chinese Taipei) Chan Yung-jan; (Chinese Taipei) Chan Hao-ching	6–7^{(9–11)}, 6–1, [10–8]
Loss	2016	Madrid Open	Clay	(India) Sania Mirza	(France) Caroline Garcia (France) Kristina Mladenovic	4–6, 4–6
Win	2016	Italian Open (2)	Clay	(India) Sania Mirza	(Russia) Ekaterina Makarova (Russia) Elena Vesnina	6–1, 6–7^{(5–7)}, [10–3]
Loss	2016	Cincinnati Open	Hard	(United States) CoCo Vandeweghe	(India) Sania Mirza; (Czech Republic) Barbora Strýcová	5–7, 4–6
Win	2017	Indian Wells Open	Hard	(Chinese Taipei) Chan Yung-jan	(Czech Republic) Lucie Hradecká (Czech Republic) Kateřina Siniaková	7–6^{(7–4)}, 6–2
Win	2017	Madrid Open	Clay	(Chinese Taipei) Chan Yung-jan	(Hungary) Tímea Babos (Czech Republic) Andrea Hlaváčková	6–4, 6–3
Win	2017	Italian Open (3)	Clay	(Chinese Taipei) Chan Yung-jan	(Russia) Ekaterina Makarova (Russia) Elena Vesnina	7–5, 7–6^{(7–4)}
Win	2017	Cincinnati Open	Hard	(Chinese Taipei) Chan Yung-jan	(Chinese Taipei) Hsieh Su-wei; (Romania) Monica Niculescu	4–6, 6–4, [10–7]
Win	2017	Wuhan Open (3)	Hard	(Chinese Taipei) Chan Yung-jan	(Japan) Shuko Aoyama; (China) Yang Zhaoxuan	7–6^{(7–5)}, 3–6, [10–4]
Win	2017	China Open (2)	Hard	(Chinese Taipei) Chan Yung-jan	(Hungary) Tímea Babos; (Czech Republic) Andrea Hlaváčková	6–1, 6–4

=== Summer Olympics ===
==== Doubles: 1 (silver medal) ====
Result	Year	Tournament	Surface	Partner	Opponent	Score
Silver	2016	Rio de Janeiro Olympics	Hard	(Switzerland) Timea Bacsinszky	(Russia) Ekaterina Makarova (Russia) Elena Vesnina	4–6, 4–6

== WTA Tour finals ==
=== Singles: 69 (43 titles, 25 runner-ups, 1 not played) ===
Legend Grand Slam (5–7) Year-end (Finals) (2–2) WTA 1000 (Tier I) (17–10) WTA 500 (Tier II) (16–5) WTA 250 (Tier III) (3–1)	Titles by surface Hard (24–12) Clay (7–5) Grass (2–0) Carpet (10–8)	Titles by setting Outdoor (26–16) Indoor (17–9)

Result	W–L	Date	Tournament	Tier	Surface	Opponent	Score
Loss	0–1	May 1995	Hamburg Open, Germany	Tier II	Clay	(Spain) Conchita Martínez	1–6, 0–6
Loss	0–2	May 1996	Italian Open, Italy	Tier I	Clay	(Spain) Conchita Martínez	2–6, 3–6
Win	1–2	Oct 1996	Stuttgart Open, Germany	Tier II	Hard (i)	(Germany) Anke Huber	6–2, 3–6, 6–3
Loss	1–3	Oct 1996	Zurich Open, Switzerland	Tier I	Carpet (i)	(Czech Republic) Jana Novotná	2–6, 2–6
Win	2–3	Nov 1996	Oakland Classic, United States	Tier II	Carpet (i)	(United States) Monica Seles	6–2, 6–0
Loss	2–4	Nov 1996	WTA Tour Championships, United States	Finals	Carpet (i)	(Germany) Steffi Graf	3–6, 6–4, 0–6, 6–4, 0–6
Win	3–4	Jan 1997	Sydney International, Australia	Tier II	Hard	(United States) Jennifer Capriati	6–1, 5–7, 6–1
Win	4–4	Jan 1997	Australian Open	Grand Slam	Hard	(France) Mary Pierce	6–2, 6–2
Win	5–4	Feb 1997	Pan Pacific Open, Japan	Tier I	Carpet (i)	(Germany) Steffi Graf	Walkover
Win	6–4	Feb 1997	Paris Indoors, France	Tier II	Hard (i)	(Germany) Anke Huber	6–3, 3–6, 6–3
Win	7–4	Apr 1997	Miami Open, United States	Tier I	Hard	(United States) Monica Seles	6–2, 6–1
Win	8–4	Apr 1997	Charleston Open, United States	Tier I	Clay	(United States) Monica Seles	3–6, 6–3, 7–6^{(7–5)}
Loss	8–5	Jun 1997	French Open, France	Grand Slam	Clay	(Croatia) Iva Majoli	4–6, 2–6
Win	9–5	Jul 1997	Wimbledon, United Kingdom	Grand Slam	Grass	(Czech Republic) Jana Novotná	2–6, 6–3, 6–3
Win	10–5	Jul 1997	Stanford Classic, United States (2)	Tier II	Hard	(Spain) Conchita Martínez	6–0, 6–2
Win	11–5	Aug 1997	Southern California Open, United States	Tier II	Hard	(United States) Monica Seles	7–6^{(7–4)}, 6–4
Win	12–5	Sep 1997	US Open, United States	Grand Slam	Hard	(United States) Venus Williams	6–0, 6–4
Win	13–5	Oct 1997	Stuttgart Open, Germany (2)	Tier II	Hard (i)	(United States) Lisa Raymond	6–4, 6–2
Win	14–5	Nov 1997	Philadelphia Championships, United States	Tier II	Carpet (i)	(United States) Lindsay Davenport	7–5, 6–7^{(7–9)}, 7–6^{(7–4)}
Win	15–5	Jan 1998	Australian Open (2)	Grand Slam	Hard	(Spain) Conchita Martínez	6–3, 6–3
Loss	15–6	Feb 1998	Pan Pacific Open, Japan	Tier I	Carpet (i)	(United States) Lindsay Davenport	3–6, 3–6
Win	16–6	Mar 1998	Indian Wells Masters, United States	Tier I	Hard	(United States) Lindsay Davenport	6–3, 6–4
Win	17–6	May 1998	Hamburg Open, Germany	Tier II	Clay	(Czech Republic) Jana Novotná	6–3, 7–5
Win	18–6	May 1998	Italian Open	Tier I	Clay	(United States) Venus Williams	6–3, 2–6, 6–3
Loss	18–7	Aug 1998	LA Women's Tennis Championships, United States	Tier II	Hard	(United States) Lindsay Davenport	6–4, 4–6, 3–6
Loss	18–8	Sep 1998	US Open, United States	Grand Slam	Hard	(United States) Lindsay Davenport	3–6, 5–7
Win	19–8	Nov 1998	WTA Tour Championships, United States	Finals	Carpet (i)	(United States) Lindsay Davenport	7–5, 4–6, 6–4, 6–2
Loss	19–9	Jan 1999	Sydney International, Australia	Tier II	Hard	(United States) Lindsay Davenport	4–6, 3–6
Win	20–9	Jan 1999	Australian Open (3)	Grand Slam	Hard	(France) Amélie Mauresmo	6–2, 6–3
Win	21–9	Feb 1999	Pan Pacific Open, Japan (2)	Tier I	Carpet (i)	(South Africa) Amanda Coetzer	6–2, 6–1
Win	22–9	Apr 1999	Charleston Open, United States (2)	Tier I	Clay	(Russia) Anna Kournikova	6–4, 6–3
Win	23–9	May 1999	German Open	Tier I	Clay	(France) Julie Halard-Decugis	6–0, 6–1
Loss	23–10	Jun 1999	French Open	Grand Slam	Clay	(Germany) Steffi Graf	6–4, 5–7, 2–6
Win	24–10	Aug 1999	Southern California Open, United States (2)	Tier II	Hard	(United States) Venus Williams	6–4, 6–0
Win	25–10	Aug 1999	Canadian Open	Tier I	Hard	(United States) Monica Seles	6–4, 6–4
Loss	25–11	Sep 1999	US Open, United States	Grand Slam	Hard	(United States) Serena Williams	3–6, 6–7^{(4–7)}
Win	26–11	Oct 1999	Stuttgart Open, Germany (3)	Tier II	Hard (i)	(France) Mary Pierce	6–4, 6–1
Loss	26–12	Oct 1999	Zurich Open, Switzerland	Tier I	Hard (i)	(United States) Venus Williams	3–6, 4–6
Loss	26–13	Nov 1999	Philadelphia Championships, United States	Tier II	Carpet (i)	(United States) Lindsay Davenport	3–6, 4–6
Loss	26–14	Nov 1999	WTA Tour Championships, United States	Finals	Carpet (i)	(United States) Lindsay Davenport	4–6, 2–6
Loss	26–15	Jan 2000	Australian Open	Grand Slam	Hard	(United States) Lindsay Davenport	1–6, 5–7
Win	27–15	Feb 2000	Pan Pacific Open, Japan (3)	Tier I	Carpet (i)	(France) Sandrine Testud	6–3, 7–5
Canceled	27–15	Mar 2000	State Farm Classic, United States	Tier II	Hard	(United States) Lindsay Davenport	N/A
Loss	27–16	Mar 2000	Indian Wells Open, United States	Tier I	Hard	(United States) Lindsay Davenport	6–4, 4–6, 0–6
Win	28–16	Apr 2000	Miami Open, United States (2)	Tier I	Hard	(United States) Lindsay Davenport	6–3, 6–2
Win	29–16	May 2000	Hamburg Open, Germany (2)	Tier II	Clay	(Spain) Arantxa Sánchez Vicario	6–3, 6–3
Win	30–16	Jun 2000	Rosmalen Championships, Netherlands	Tier III	Grass	(Romania) Ruxandra Dragomir	6–2, 3–0 ret.
Win	31–16	Aug 2000	Canadian Open, Canada (2)	Tier I	Hard	(United States) Serena Williams	0–6, 6–3, 3–0 ret.
Win	32–16	Oct 2000	Stuttgart Open, Germany (4)	Tier II	Hard (i)	(Belgium) Kim Clijsters	6–0, 6–3
Win	33–16	Oct 2000	Zurich Open, Switzerland	Tier I	Hard (i)	(United States) Lindsay Davenport	6–4, 4–6, 7–5
Win	34–16	Oct 2000	Kremlin Cup, Russia	Tier I	Carpet (i)	(Russia) Anna Kournikova	6–3, 6–1
Loss	34–17	Nov 2000	Philadelphia Championships, United States	Tier II	Carpet (i)	(United States) Lindsay Davenport	6–7^{(7–9)}, 4–6
Win	35–17	Nov 2000	WTA Tour Championships, United States (2)	Finals	Carpet (i)	(United States) Monica Seles	6–7^{(5–7)}, 6–4, 6–4
Win	36–17	Jan 2001	Sydney International, Australia (2)	Tier II	Hard	(United States) Lindsay Davenport	6–3, 4–6, 7–5
Loss	36–18	Jan 2001	Australian Open	Grand Slam	Hard	(United States) Jennifer Capriati	4–6, 3–6
Loss	36–19	Feb 2001	Pan Pacific Open, Japan	Tier I	Carpet (i)	(United States) Lindsay Davenport	7–6^{(7–4)}, 4–6, 2–6
Win	37–19	Feb 2001	Qatar Ladies Open	Tier III	Hard	(France) Sandrine Testud	6–3, 6–2
Win	38–19	Feb 2001	Dubai Tennis Championships, UAE	Tier II	Hard	(France) Nathalie Tauziat	6–4, 6–4
Loss	38–20	Apr 2001	Charleston Open, United States	Tier I	Clay	(United States) Jennifer Capriati	0–6, 6–4, 4–6
Win	39–20	Jan 2002	Sydney International, Australia (3)	Tier II	Hard	(United States) Meghann Shaughnessy	6–2, 6–3
Loss	39–21	Jan 2002	Australian Open	Grand Slam	Hard	(United States) Jennifer Capriati	6–4, 6–7^{(7–9)}, 2–6
Win	40–21	Feb 2002	Pan Pacific Open, Japan (4)	Tier I	Carpet (i)	(United States) Monica Seles	7–6^{(8–6)}, 4–6, 6–3
Loss	40–22	Mar 2002	Indian Wells Open, United States	Tier I	Hard	(Slovakia) Daniela Hantuchová	3–6, 4–6
Loss	40–23	Feb 2006	Pan Pacific Open, Japan	Tier I	Carpet (i)	(Russia) Elena Dementieva	2–6, 0–6
Win	41–23	May 2006	Italian Open, Italy (2)	Tier I	Clay	(Russia) Dinara Safina	6–2, 7–5
Loss	41–24	Aug 2006	Canadian Open, Canada	Tier I	Hard	(Serbia) Ana Ivanovic	2–6, 3–6
Win	42–24	Sep 2006	Kolkata Open, India	Tier III	Hard (i)	(Russia) Olga Puchkova	6–0, 6–4
Loss	42–25	Jan 2007	Gold Coast Championships, Australia	Tier III	Hard	(Russia) Dinara Safina	3–6, 6–3, 5–7
Win	43–25	Feb 2007	Pan Pacific Open, Japan (5)	Tier I	Carpet (i)	(Serbia) Ana Ivanovic	6–4, 6–2

=== Doubles: 86 (64 titles, 22 runner-ups) ===
Legend Grand Slam (13–3) Year-end (Finals) (3–0) Olympics (0–1) WTA 1000 (Tier I / Premier 5 / Premier M) (26–9) WTA 500 (Tier II / Premier) (20–8) WTA 250 (International) (2–1)	Titles by surface Hard (38–10) Clay (10–8) Grass (6–1) Carpet (10–3)	Titles by setting Outdoor (48–16) Indoor (16–6)

Result	W–L	Date	Tournament	Tier	Surface	Partner	Opponents	Score
Win	1–0	May 1995	Hamburg Open, Germany	Tier II	Clay	(United States) Gigi Fernández	(Spain) Conchita Martínez; (Argentina) Patricia Tarabini	6–2, 6–3
Loss	1–1	Aug 1995	Canadian Open, Canada	Tier I	Hard	(Croatia) Iva Majoli	(Argentina) Gabriela Sabatini; (Netherlands) Brenda Schultz-McCarthy	6–4, 0–6, 3–6
Loss	1–2	May 1996	Hamburg Open, Germany	Tier II	Clay	(United States) Gigi Fernández	(Spain) Arantxa Sánchez Vicario (Netherlands) Brenda Schultz-McCarthy	6–4, 6–7^{(10–12)}, 4–6
Loss	1–3	May 1996	Italian Open, Italy	Tier I	Clay	(United States) Gigi Fernández	(Spain) Arantxa Sánchez Vicario (Romania) Irina Spîrlea	4–6, 6–3, 3–6
Loss	1–4	May 1996	German Open, Germany	Tier I	Clay	(Czech Republic) Helena Suková	(United States) Meredith McGrath; (Latvia) Larisa Neiland	1–6, 7–5, 6–7^{(4–7)}
Win	2–4	Jul 1996	Wimbledon, United Kingdom	Grand Slam	Grass	(Czech Republic) Helena Suková	(United States) Meredith McGrath (Latvia) Larisa Neiland	5–7, 7–5, 6–1
Loss	2–5	Oct 1996	Stuttgart Open, Germany	Tier II	Hard (i)	(Czech Republic) Helena Suková	(United States) Nicole Arendt; (Czech Republic) Jana Novotná	2–6, 3–6
Win	3–5	Oct 1996	Zurich Open, Switzerland	Tier I	Carpet (i)	(Czech Republic) Helena Suková	(United States) Nicole Arendt (Belarus) Natasha Zvereva	7–5, 6–4
Win	4–5	Jan 1997	Australian Open, Australia	Grand Slam	Hard	(Belarus) Natasha Zvereva	(United States) Lindsay Davenport; (United States) Lisa Raymond	6–2, 6–2
Loss	4–6	Feb 1997	Pan Pacific Open, Japan	Tier I	Carpet (i)	(United States) Gigi Fernández	(United States) Lindsay Davenport (Belarus) Natasha Zvereva	4–6, 3–6
Win	5–6	Feb 1997	Paris Indoors, France	Tier II	Hard (i)	(Czech Republic) Helena Suková	(France) Alexandra Fusai; (Italy) Rita Grande	6–3, 6–0
Win	6–6	Apr 1997	Charleston Open, US	Tier I	Clay	(United States) Mary Joe Fernández	(United States) Lindsay Davenport (Czech Republic) Jana Novotná	7–5, 4–6, 6–1
Win	7–6	Jul 1997	Stanford Classic, US	Tier II	Hard	(United States) Lindsay Davenport	(Spain) Conchita Martínez (Argentina) Patricia Tarabini	6–1, 6–3
Win	8–6	Aug 1997	Southern California Open, US	Tier II	Hard	(Spain) Arantxa Sánchez Vicario	(United States) Amy Frazier; (United States) Kimberly Po	6–3, 7–5
Win	9–6	Sep 1997	Sparkassen Cup, Germany	Tier II	Carpet (i)	(Czech Republic) Jana Novotná	(Indonesia) Yayuk Basuki (Czech Republic) Helena Suková	6–2, 6–2
Win	10–6	Oct 1997	Stuttgart Open, Germany	Tier II	Hard (i)	(Spain) Arantxa Sánchez Vicario	(United States) Lindsay Davenport (Czech Republic) Jana Novotná	7–6^{(7–4)}, 3–6, 7–6^{(7–3)}
Win	11–6	Oct 1997	Zurich Open, Switzerland (2)	Tier I	Carpet (i)	(Spain) Arantxa Sánchez Vicario	(Latvia) Larisa Neiland (Czech Republic) Helena Suková	4–6, 6–4, 6–1
Win	12–6	Jan 1998	Sydney International, Australia	Tier II	Hard	(Czech Republic) Helena Suková	(United States) Katrina Adams (United States) Meredith McGrath	6–1, 6–2
Win	13–6	Feb 1998	Australian Open (2)	Grand Slam	Hard	(Croatia) Mirjana Lučić	(United States) Lindsay Davenport (Belarus) Natasha Zvereva	6–4, 2–6, 6–3
Win	14–6	Feb 1998	Pan Pacific Open, Japan	Tier I	Carpet (i)	(Croatia) Mirjana Lučić	(United States) Lindsay Davenport (Belarus) Natasha Zvereva	7–5, 6–4
Win	15–6	Mar 1998	Miami Open, US	Tier I	Hard	(Czech Republic) Jana Novotná	(Spain) Arantxa Sánchez Vicario (Belarus) Natasha Zvereva	6–2, 3–6, 6–3
Loss	15–7	May 1998	Hamburg Open, Germany	Tier II	Clay	(Czech Republic) Jana Novotná	(Austria) Barbara Schett; (Switzerland) Patty Schnyder	6–7^{(3–7)}, 6–3, 3–6
Win	16–7	Jun 1998	French Open, France	Grand Slam	Clay	(Czech Republic) Jana Novotná	(United States) Lindsay Davenport (Belarus) Natasha Zvereva	6–1, 7–6^{(7–4)}
Win	17–7	Jul 1998	Wimbledon, UK (2)	Grand Slam	Grass	(Czech Republic) Jana Novotná	(United States) Lindsay Davenport (Belarus) Natasha Zvereva	6–3, 3–6, 8–6
Win	18–7	Aug 1998	LA Women's Tennis Championships, US	Tier II	Hard	(Belarus) Natasha Zvereva	(Thailand) Tamarine Tanasugarn; (Ukraine) Elena Tatarkova	6–4, 6–2
Win	19–7	Aug 1998	Canadian Open, Canada	Tier I	Hard	(Czech Republic) Jana Novotná	(Indonesia) Yayuk Basuki (Netherlands) Caroline Vis	6–3, 6–4
Win	20–7	Sep 1998	US Open	Grand Slam	Hard	(Czech Republic) Jana Novotná	(United States) Lindsay Davenport (Belarus) Natasha Zvereva	6–3, 6–3
Win	21–7	Jan 1999	Australian Open (3)	Grand Slam	Hard	(Russia) Anna Kournikova	(United States) Lindsay Davenport (Belarus) Natasha Zvereva	7–5, 6–3
Loss	21–8	Feb 1999	Pan Pacific Open, Japan	Tier I	Carpet (i)	(Czech Republic) Jana Novotná	(United States) Lindsay Davenport (Belarus) Natasha Zvereva	2–6, 3–6
Win	22–8	Mar 1999	Indian Wells Open, US	Tier I	Hard	(Russia) Anna Kournikova	(United States) Mary Joe Fernández (Czech Republic) Jana Novotná	6–2, 6–2
Win	23–8	Mar 1999	Miami Open, US (2)	Tier I	Hard	(Czech Republic) Jana Novotná	(United States) Mary Joe Fernández (United States) Monica Seles	0–6, 6–4, 7–6^{(7–1)}
Win	24–8	May 1999	Italian Open, Italy	Tier I	Clay	(Russia) Anna Kournikova	(France) Alexandra Fusai (France) Nathalie Tauziat	6–2, 6–2
Loss	24–9	Jun 1999	French Open, France	Grand Slam	Clay	(Russia) Anna Kournikova	(United States) Serena Williams; (United States) Venus Williams	3–6, 7–6^{(7–2)}, 6–8
Win	25–9	Jun 1999	Eastbourne International, UK	Tier II	Grass	(Russia) Anna Kournikova	(Czech Republic) Jana Novotná (Belarus) Natasha Zvereva	6–4 ret.
Win	26–9	Nov 1999	WTA Tour Championships, US	Finals	Carpet (i)	(Russia) Anna Kournikova	(Latvia) Larisa Neiland (Spain) Arantxa Sánchez Vicario	6–4, 6–4
Loss	26–10	Jan 2000	Sydney International, Australia	Tier II	Hard	(France) Mary Pierce	(France) Julie Halard-Decugis; (Japan) Ai Sugiyama	0–6, 3–6
Loss	26–11	Jan 2000	Australian Open, Australia	Grand Slam	Hard	(France) Mary Pierce	(United States) Lisa Raymond (Australia) Rennae Stubbs	4–6, 7–5, 4–6
Win	27–11	Feb 2000	Pan Pacific Open, Japan (2)	Tier I	Carpet (i)	(France) Mary Pierce	(France) Alexandra Fusai (France) Nathalie Tauziat	6–4, 6–1
Win	28–11	Jun 2000	French Open, France (2)	Grand Slam	Clay	(France) Mary Pierce	(Spain) Virginia Ruano Pascual; (Argentina) Paola Suárez	6–2, 6–4
Win	29–11	Aug 2000	Canadian Open, Canada (2)	Tier I	Hard	(France) Nathalie Tauziat	(France) Julie Halard-Decugis (Japan) Ai Sugiyama	6–3, 3–6, 6–4
Win	30–11	Oct 2000	Stuttgart Open, Germany (2)	Tier II	Hard (i)	(Russia) Anna Kournikova	(Spain) Arantxa Sánchez Vicario (Austria) Barbara Schett	6–4, 6–2
Win	31–11	Oct 2000	Zurich Open, Switzerland (3)	Tier I	Carpet (i)	(Russia) Anna Kournikova	(United States) Kimberly Po (France) Anne-Gaëlle Sidot	6–3, 6–4
Loss	31–12	Oct 2000	Kremlin Cup, Russia	Tier I	Carpet (i)	(Russia) Anna Kournikova	(France) Julie Halard-Decugis (Japan) Ai Sugiyama	6–4, 4–6, 6–7^{(5–7)}
Win	32–12	Nov 2000	Philadelphia Championships, US	Tier II	Carpet (i)	(Russia) Anna Kournikova	(United States) Lisa Raymond (Australia) Rennae Stubbs	6–2, 7–5
Win	33–12	Nov 2000	WTA Tour Championships, US (2)	Finals	Carpet (i)	(Russia) Anna Kournikova	(United States) Nicole Arendt (Netherlands) Manon Bollegraf	6–2, 6–3
Loss	33–13	Aug 2001	Southern California Open, US	Tier II	Hard	(Russia) Anna Kournikova	(Zimbabwe) Cara Black; (Russia) Elena Likhovtseva	4–6, 6–1, 4–6
Win	34–13	Oct 2001	Kremlin Cup, Russia	Tier I	Carpet (i)	(Russia) Anna Kournikova	(Russia) Elena Dementieva; (Russia) Lina Krasnoroutskaya	7–6^{(7–1)}, 6–3
Loss	34–14	Jan 2002	Sydney International, Australia	Tier II	Hard	(Russia) Anna Kournikova	(United States) Lisa Raymond (Australia) Rennae Stubbs	Walkover
Win	35–14	Jan 2002	Australian Open (4)	Grand Slam	Hard	(Russia) Anna Kournikova	(Slovakia) Daniela Hantuchová (Spain) Arantxa Sánchez Vicario	6–2, 6–7^{(4–7)}, 6–1
Win	36–14	May 2002	Hamburg Open, Germany (2)	Tier II	Clay	(Austria) Barbara Schett	(Slovakia) Daniela Hantuchová (Spain) Arantxa Sánchez Vicario	6–1, 6–1
Win	37–14	Mar 2007	Qatar Open, Qatar	Tier II	Hard	(Russia) Maria Kirilenko	(Hungary) Ágnes Szávay; (Czech Republic) Vladimíra Uhlířová	6–1, 6–1
Win	38–14	Mar 2014	Miami Open, US (3)	Premier M	Hard	(Germany) Sabine Lisicki	(Russia) Ekaterina Makarova; (Russia) Elena Vesnina	4–6, 6–4, [10–5]
Loss	38–15	Jun 2014	Eastbourne International, UK	Premier	Grass	(Italy) Flavia Pennetta	(Chinese Taipei) Chan Hao-ching; (Chinese Taipei) Chan Yung-jan	3–6, 7–5, [7–10]
Loss	38–16	Sep 2014	US Open, United States	Grand Slam	Hard	(Italy) Flavia Pennetta	(Russia) Ekaterina Makarova (Russia) Elena Vesnina	6–2, 3–6, 2–6
Win	39–16	Sep 2014	Wuhan Open, China	Premier 5	Hard	(Italy) Flavia Pennetta	(Zimbabwe) Cara Black (France) Caroline Garcia	6–4, 5–7, [12–10]
Win	40–16	Oct 2014	Kremlin Cup, Russia (2)	Premier	Hard (i)	(Italy) Flavia Pennetta	(France) Caroline Garcia (Spain) Arantxa Parra Santonja	6–3, 7–5
Win	41–16	Jan 2015	Brisbane International, Australia	Premier	Hard	(Germany) Sabine Lisicki	(France) Caroline Garcia (Slovenia) Katarina Srebotnik	6–2, 7–5
Win	42–16	Mar 2015	Indian Wells Open, US (2)	Premier M	Hard	(India) Sania Mirza	(Russia) Ekaterina Makarova (Russia) Elena Vesnina	6–3, 6–4
Win	43–16	Apr 2015	Miami Open, US (4)	Premier M	Hard	(India) Sania Mirza	(Russia) Ekaterina Makarova (Russia) Elena Vesnina	7–5, 6–1
Win	44–16	Apr 2015	Charleston Open, US (2)	Premier	Clay	(India) Sania Mirza	(Australia) Casey Dellacqua; (Croatia) Darija Jurak	6–0, 6–4
Loss	44–17	May 2015	Italian Open, Italy	Premier 5	Clay	(India) Sania Mirza	(Hungary) Tímea Babos; (France) Kristina Mladenovic	4–6, 3–6
Win	45–17	Jul 2015	Wimbledon, UK (3)	Grand Slam	Grass	(India) Sania Mirza	(Russia) Ekaterina Makarova (Russia) Elena Vesnina	5–7, 7–6^{(7–4)}, 7–5
Win	46–17	Sep 2015	US Open (2)	Grand Slam	Hard	(India) Sania Mirza	(Australia) Casey Dellacqua (Kazakhstan) Yaroslava Shvedova	6–3, 6–3
Win	47–17	Sep 2015	Guangzhou Open, China	International	Hard	(India) Sania Mirza	(China) Xu Shilin; (China) You Xiaodi	6–3, 6–1
Win	48–17	Oct 2015	Wuhan Open, China (2)	Premier 5	Hard	(India) Sania Mirza	(Romania) Irina-Camelia Begu; (Romania) Monica Niculescu	6–2, 6–3
Win	49–17	Oct 2015	China Open, China	Premier M	Hard	(India) Sania Mirza	(Chinese Taipei) Chan Hao-ching (Chinese Taipei) Chan Yung-jan	6–7^{(9–11)}, 6–1, [10–8]
Win	50–17	Nov 2015	WTA Finals, Singapore	Finals	Hard (i)	(India) Sania Mirza	(Spain) Garbiñe Muguruza; (Spain) Carla Suárez Navarro	6–0, 6–3
Win	51–17	Jan 2016	Brisbane International, Australia (2)	Premier	Hard	(India) Sania Mirza	(Germany) Angelique Kerber; (Germany) Andrea Petkovic	7–5, 6–1
Win	52–17	Jan 2016	Sydney International, Australia (2)	Premier	Hard	(India) Sania Mirza	(France) Caroline Garcia (France) Kristina Mladenovic	1–6, 7–5, [10–5]
Win	53–17	Jan 2016	Australian Open (5)	Grand Slam	Hard	(India) Sania Mirza	(Czech Republic) Andrea Hlaváčková; (Czech Republic) Lucie Hradecká	7–6^{(7–1)}, 6–3
Win	54–17	Feb 2016	St. Petersburg Ladies' Trophy, Russia	Premier	Hard (i)	(India) Sania Mirza	(Russia) Vera Dushevina; (Czech Republic) Barbora Krejčíková	6–3, 6–1
Loss	54–18	Apr 2016	Stuttgart Open, Germany	Premier	Clay (i)	(India) Sania Mirza	(France) Caroline Garcia (France) Kristina Mladenovic	6–2, 1–6, [6–10]
Loss	54–19	May 2016	Madrid Open, Spain	Premier M	Clay	(India) Sania Mirza	(France) Caroline Garcia (France) Kristina Mladenovic	4–6, 4–6
Win	55–19	May 2016	Italian Open, Italy (2)	Premier 5	Clay	(India) Sania Mirza	(Russia) Ekaterina Makarova (Russia) Elena Vesnina	6–1, 6–7^{(5–7)}, [10–3]
Loss	55–20	Aug 2016	Rio Olympics, Brazil	Olympics	Hard	(Switzerland) Timea Bacsinszky	(Russia) Ekaterina Makarova (Russia) Elena Vesnina	4–6, 4–6
Loss	55–21	Aug 2016	Cincinnati Open, US	Premier 5	Hard	(United States) CoCo Vandeweghe	(India) Sania Mirza (Czech Republic) Barbora Strýcová	5–7, 4–6
Win	56–21	Mar 2017	Indian Wells Open, US (3)	Premier M	Hard	(Chinese Taipei) Chan Yung-jan	(Czech Republic) Lucie Hradecká (Czech Republic) Kateřina Siniaková	7–6^{(7–4)}, 6–2
Loss	56–22	Apr 2017	Ladies Open Biel Bienne, Switzerland	International	Hard (i)	(Switzerland) Timea Bacsinszky	(Chinese Taipei) Hsieh Su-wei (Romania) Monica Niculescu	7–5, 3–6, [7–10]
Win	57–22	May 2017	Madrid Open, Spain	Premier M	Clay	(Chinese Taipei) Chan Yung-jan	(Hungary) Tímea Babos (Czech Republic) Andrea Hlaváčková	6–4, 6–3
Win	58–22	May 2017	Italian Open, Italy (3)	Premier 5	Clay	(Chinese Taipei) Chan Yung-jan	(Russia) Ekaterina Makarova (Russia) Elena Vesnina	7–5, 7–6^{(7–4)}
Win	59–22	Jun 2017	Mallorca Open, Spain	International	Grass	(Chinese Taipei) Chan Yung-jan	(Serbia) Jelena Janković; (Latvia) Anastasija Sevastova	Walkover
Win	60–22	Jul 2017	Eastbourne International, UK (2)	Premier	Grass	(Chinese Taipei) Chan Yung-jan	(Australia) Ashleigh Barty (Australia) Casey Dellacqua	6–3, 7–5
Win	61–22	Aug 2017	Cincinnati Open, US	Premier 5	Hard	(Chinese Taipei) Chan Yung-jan	(Chinese Taipei) Hsieh Su-wei (Romania) Monica Niculescu	4–6, 6–4, [10–7]
Win	62–22	Sep 2017	US Open, United States (3)	Grand Slam	Hard	(Chinese Taipei) Chan Yung-jan	(Czech Republic) Lucie Hradecká (Czech Republic) Kateřina Siniaková	6–3, 6–2
Win	63–22	Sep 2017	Wuhan Open, China (3)	Premier 5	Hard	(Chinese Taipei) Chan Yung-jan	(Japan) Shuko Aoyama; (China) Yang Zhaoxuan	7–6^{(7–5)}, 3–6, [10–4]
Win	64–22	Sep 2017	China Open, China (2)	Premier M	Hard	(Chinese Taipei) Chan Yung-jan	(Hungary) Tímea Babos (Czech Republic) Andrea Hlaváčková	6–1, 6–4

== ITF Circuit finals ==
=== Singles: 3 (2 titles, 1 runner-up) ===
Legend 50K tournaments 25K tournaments 10K tournaments	Finals by surface Hard (1–1) Carpet (1–0)

Result	W–L	Date	Tournament	Tier	Surface	Opponent	Score
Win	1–0	Oct 1993	ITF Langenthal, Switzerland	10K	Carpet	(France) Sophie Georges	2–6, 7–5, 7–6^{(7–4)}
Loss	1–1	Feb 1995	ITF Prostějov, Czech Republic	25K	Hard (i)	(Slovakia) Karina Habšudová	5–7, 4–6
Win	2–1	Mar 1996	ITF Prostějov, Czech Republic	50K	Hard (i)	(Austria) Barbara Paulus	6–1, 6–4

=== Doubles: 1 title ===
Legend 25K tournaments	Titles by surface Hard (1–0)

Result	W–L	Date	Tournament	Tier	Surface	Partner	Opponent	Score
Win	1–0	Feb 1995	ITF Prostějov, Czech Republic	25K	Hard (i)	(Czech Republic) Petra Langrová	(Czech Republic) Eva Melicharová; (Poland) Katarzyna Teodorowicz	7–6^{(7–4)}, 6–2

== Team competition ==
=== Finals: 3 (1 title, 2 runner-ups) ===
Result	W–L	Date	Tournament	Surface	Partners	Opponents	Score
Loss	0–1	Jan 1996	Hopman Cup, Australia	Hard	(Switzerland) Marc Rosset	(Croatia) Iva Majoli; (Croatia) Goran Ivanišević	1–2
Loss	0–2	Sep 1998	Fed Cup, Switzerland	Hard (i)	(Switzerland) Patty Schnyder; (Switzerland) Emmanuelle Gagliardi	(Spain) Conchita Martínez; (Spain) Arantxa Sánchez Vicario; (Spain) Magüi Serna; (Spain) Virginia Ruano Pascual	2–3
Win	1–2	Jan 2001	Hopman Cup, Australia	Hard	(Switzerland) Roger Federer	(United States) Monica Seles; (United States) Jan-Michael Gambill	2–1

== ITF Junior Circuit ==
=== Junior Grand Slam finals ===
==== Singles: 4 (3 titles, 1 runner-up) ====
Result	Year	Tournament	Surface	Opponent	Score
Win	1993	French Open	Clay	(Belgium) Laurence Courtois	7–5, 7–5
Win	1994	French Open	Clay	(Canada) Sonya Jeyaseelan	6–3, 6–1
Win	1994	Wimbledon	Grass	(South Korea) Jeon Mi-ra	7–5, 6–4
Loss	1994	US Open	Hard	(United States) Meilen Tu	2–6, 4–6

==== Doubles: 1 (title) ====
Result	Year	Tournament	Surface	Partner	Opponents	Score
Win	1994	French Open	Clay	(Slovakia) Henrieta Nagyová	(Czech Republic) Lenka Cenková (Czech Republic) Ludmila Richterová	6–3, 6–2

== WTA Tour career earnings ==
Year	Grand Slam titles	WTA titles	Total titles	Earnings ($)	Money list rank
1995	0	0	0	186,567	32
1996	0	2	2	1,330,996	4
1997	3	9	12	3,400,196	1
1998	1	4	5	2,760,960	1
1999	1	6	7	2,936,425	1
2000	0	9	9	3,457,049	1
2001	0	3	3	1,765,116	5
2002	0	2	2	1,467,584	5
...	DNP				
2006	0	2	2	1,159,537	8
2007	0	1	1	625,295	23
...	DNP				
2013	0	0	0	20,604	302
2014	0	0	0	397,553	73
2015	0	0	0	1,756,400	15
2016	0	0	0	850,869	37
2017*	0	0	0	1,514,241	
Career	5	38	43	24,670,324	7

Notes

- Grand Slam titles, WTA titles, Total titles – Includes singles, doubles and mixed doubles titles.

== Career Grand Slam seedings ==
Year	Australian Open	French Open	Wimbledon	US Open
1995	not seeded	not seeded	not seeded	not seeded
1996	not seeded	15th	16th	16th
1997	4th (1)	1st	1st (2)	1st (3)
1998	1st (4)	1st	1st	1st
1999	2nd (5)	1st	1st	1st
2000	1st	1st	1st	1st
2001	1st	1st	1st	1st
2002	3rd	did not play	did not play	9th
2006	wildcard	12th	12th	8th
2007	6th	did not play	9th	16th

== Wins against top 10 players ==
- Hingis has a 105–75 record against players who were, at the time the match was played, ranked in the top 10.

No.	Player	Rk	Event	Surface	Rd	Score	Rk	Years	Ref
1	(Czech Republic) Jana Novotná	5	Hamburg Open, Germany	Clay	2R	6–1, 2–6, 6–2		1995	
2	(Germany) Anke Huber	10	Hamburg Open, Germany	Clay	SF	6–2, 1–6, 6–3		1995	
3	(Bulgaria) Magdalena Maleeva	7	US Open, United States	Hard	2R	4–6, 6–4, 6–2		1995	
4	(Argentina) Gabriela Sabatini	7	Pan Pacific Open, Japan	Carpet (i)	1R	6–3, 6–4		1996	
5	(Germany) Steffi Graf	1	Italian Open, Italy	Clay	QF	2–6, 6–2, 6–3		1996	
6	(Spain) Arantxa Sánchez Vicario	2	US Open, United States	Hard	4R	6–1, 3–6, 6–4		1996	
7	(Czech Republic) Jana Novotná	7	US Open, United States	Hard	QF	7–6^{(7–1)}, 6–4		1996	
8	(Spain) Arantxa Sánchez Vicario	2	Stuttgart Open, Germany	Hard (i)	QF	6–1, 6–4		1996	
9	(United States) Lindsay Davenport	6	Stuttgart Open, Germany	Hard (i)	SF	3–6, 6–2, 6–3		1996	
10	(Germany) Anke Huber	5	Stuttgart Open, Germany	Hard (i)	F	6–2, 3–6, 6–3		1996	
11	(Germany) Anke Huber	4	Zurich Open, Switzerland	Carpet (i)	SF	3–6, 6–2, 7–6^{(8–6)}		1996	
12	(United States) Lindsay Davenport	6	Ameritech Cup, United States	Carpet (i)	QF	6–3, 6–7^{(5–7)}, 6–2		1996	
13	(United States) Monica Seles	2	Silicon Valley Classic, United States	Carpet (i)	F	6–2, 6–0		1996	
14	(Croatia) Iva Majoli	7	WTA Tour Championships, United States	Carpet (i)	SF	6–2, 4–6, 6–1		1996	
15	(Romania) Irina Spîrlea	10	Australian Open, Australia	Hard	QF	7–5, 6–2		1997	
16	(Germany) Anke Huber	8	Pan Pacific Open, Japan	Carpet (i)	SF	6–1, 5–7, 6–2		1997	
17	(Croatia) Iva Majoli	9	Open GDF Suez, France	Carpet (i)	SF	6–1, 6–3		1997	
18	(Germany) Anke Huber	7	Open GDF Suez, France	Carpet (i)	F	6–3, 3–6, 6–3		1997	
19	(Czech Republic) Jana Novotná	4	Miami Open, United States	Hard	SF	6–3, 2–6, 6–4		1997	
20	(United States) Monica Seles	5	Miami Open, United States	Hard	F	6–2, 6–1		1997	
21	(United States) Monica Seles	5	Charleston Open, United States	Clay	F	3–6, 6–3, 7–6^{(7–5)}		1997	
22	(Spain) Arantxa Sánchez Vicario	6	French Open, France	Clay	QF	6–2, 6–2		1997	
23	(United States) Monica Seles	4	French Open, France	Clay	SF	6–7^{(2–7)}, 7–5, 6–4		1997	
24	(Czech Republic) Jana Novotná	3	Wimbledon, United Kingdom	Grass	F	2–6, 6–3, 6–3		1997	
25	(United States) Lindsay Davenport	7	Silicon Valley Classic, United States	Hard	SF	6–3, 1–6, 6–2		1997	
26	(Spain) Conchita Martínez	10	Southern California Open, United States	Hard	QF	6–4, 6–4		1997	
27	(United States) Monica Seles	3	Southern California Open, United States	Hard	F	7–6^{(7–4)}, 6–4		1997	
28	(United States) Lindsay Davenport	6	US Open, United States	Hard	SF	6–2, 6–4		1997	
29	(South Africa) Amanda Coetzer	6	Stuttgart Open, Germany	Hard (i)	SF	6–2, 6–1		1997	
30	(Spain) Arantxa Sánchez Vicario	9	Philadelphia Championships, United States	Carpet (i)	SF	1–6, 7–6^{(7–5)}, 6–3		1997	
31	(United States) Lindsay Davenport	3	Philadelphia Championships, United States	Carpet (i)	F	7–5, 6–7^{(7–9)}, 7–6^{(7–4)}		1997	
32	(France) Mary Pierce	7	Australian Open, Australia	Hard	QF	6–2, 6–3		1998	
33	(Croatia) Iva Majoli	5	Pan Pacific Open, Japan	Carpet (i)	SF	6–0, 6–2		1998	
34	(Spain) Conchita Martínez	9	Indian Wells Open, United States	Hard	QF	6–1, 7–5		1998	
35	(United States) Lindsay Davenport	2	Indian Wells Open, United States	Hard	F	6–3, 6–4		1998	
36	(Czech Republic) Jana Novotná	3	Fed Cup, Brno, Czech Republic	Carpet (i)	QF	4–6, 6–3, 6–2		1998	
37	(Czech Republic) Jana Novotná	3	Hamburg Open, Germany	Clay	F	6–3, 7–5		1998	
38	(Romania) Irina Spîrlea	10	Italian Open, Italy	Clay	3R	6–1, 6–2		1998	
39	(United States) Venus Williams	9	Italian Open, Italy	Clay	F	6–2, 3–6, 6–2		1998	
40	(United States) Venus Williams	7	French Open, France	Clay	QF	6–3, 6–4		1998	
41	(Spain) Arantxa Sánchez Vicario	4	Wimbledon, United Kingdom	Grass	QF	6–3, 3–6, 6–3		1998	
42	(Spain) Arantxa Sánchez Vicario	4	LA Championships, United States	Hard	SF	6–4, 6–4		1998	
43	(United States) Monica Seles	6	US Open, United States	Hard	QF	6–4, 6–4		1998	
44	(Czech Republic) Jana Novotná	2	US Open, United States	Hard	SF	3–6, 6–1, 6–4		1998	
45	(Spain) Arantxa Sánchez Vicario	4	Fed Cup, Geneva, Switzerland	Hard (i)	F	7–6^{(7–5)}, 6–3		1998	
46	(Spain) Conchita Martínez	7	Fed Cup, Geneva, Switzerland	Hard (i)	F	6–4, 6–4		1998	
47	(Spain) Conchita Martínez	7	Grand Slam Cup, Germany	Hard (i)	QF	6–2, 7–5		1998	
48	(Switzerland) Patty Schnyder	10	WTA Tour Championships, United States	Carpet (i)	1R	4–6, 6–0, 6–3		1998	
49	(France) Mary Pierce	7	WTA Tour Championships, United States	Carpet (i)	QF	7–6^{(7–4)}, 6–4		1998	
50	(United States) Lindsay Davenport	1	WTA Tour Championships, United States	Carpet (i)	F	7–5, 6–4, 4–6, 6–2		1998	
51	(France) Mary Pierce	7	Australian Open, Australia	Hard	QF	6–3, 6–4		1999	
52	(United States) Monica Seles	4	Australian Open, Australia	Hard	SF	6–2, 6–4		1999	
53	(Germany) Steffi Graf	7	Pan Pacific Open, Japan	Carpet (i)	QF	3–6, 6–2, 6–4		1999	
54	(Czech Republic) Jana Novotná	3	Pan Pacific Open, Japan	Carpet (i)	SF	6–3, 6–4		1999	
55	(Czech Republic) Jana Novotná	4	Hilton Head, United States	Clay	SF	6–2, 6–3		1999	
56	(United States) Serena Williams	10	Italian Open, Italy	Clay	QF	6–2, 6–2		1999	
57	(Spain) Arantxa Sánchez Vicario	7	Berlin Open, Germany	Clay	SF	6–4, 6–0		1999	
58	(Spain) Arantxa Sánchez Vicario	7	French Open, France	Clay	SF	6–3, 6–2		1999	
59	(South Africa) Amanda Coetzer	9	Southern California Open, United States	Hard	SF	6–1, 6–2		1999	
60	(United States) Venus Williams	4	Southern California Open, United States	Hard	F	6–4, 6–0		1999	
61	(Spain) Arantxa Sánchez Vicario	10	Canadian Open, Canada	Hard	QF	6–1, 6–1		1999	
62	(France) Mary Pierce	6	Canadian Open, Canada	Hard	SF	7–6^{(7–3)}, 6–3		1999	
63	(United States) Monica Seles	5	Canadian Open, Canada	Hard	F	6–4, 6–4		1999	
64	(Spain) Arantxa Sánchez Vicario	8	US Open, United States	Hard	4R	6–4, 7–5		1999	
65	(United States) Venus Williams	3	US Open, United States	Hard	SF	6–1, 4–6, 6–3		1999	
66	(France) Mary Pierce	6	Stuttgart Open, Germany	Hard (i)	F	6–4, 6–1		1999	
67	(France) Nathalie Tauziat	10	Zurich Open, Switzerland	Hard (i)	SF	6–3, 4–6, 6–3		1999	
68	(France) Nathalie Tauziat	7	Philadelphia Championships, United States	Carpet (i)	SF	6–4, 6–2		1999	
69	(France) Mary Pierce	5	WTA Tour Championships, United States	Carpet (i)	QF	6–1, 6–2		1999	
70	(United States) Venus Williams	3	WTA Tour Championships, United States	Carpet (i)	SF	6–4, 7–6^{(7–2)}		1999	
71	(France) Mary Pierce	6	State Farm Classic, United States	Hard	SF	6–4, 6–3		2000	
72	(United States) Monica Seles	8	Indian Wells Open, United States	Hard	QF	6–3, 6–1		2000	
73	(France) Mary Pierce	6	Indian Wells Open, United States	Hard	SF	6–4, 6–2		2000	
74	(United States) Monica Seles	8	Miami Open, United States	Hard	SF	6–0, 6–0		2000	
75	(United States) Lindsay Davenport	2	Miami Open, United States	Hard	F	6–3, 6–2		2000	
76	(France) Sandrine Testud	10	Berlin Open, Germany	Clay	QF	7–5, 5–7, 6–2		2000	
77	(Spain) Conchita Martínez	6	Canadian Open, Canada	Hard	SF	6–3, 6–2		2000	
78	(United States) Serena Williams	7	Canadian Open, Canada	Hard	F	0–6, 6–3, 3–0, ret.		2000	
79	(United States) Monica Seles	5	US Open, United States	Hard	QF	6–0, 7–5		2000	
80	(Spain) Arantxa Sánchez Vicario	9	Stuttgart Open, Germany	Hard (i)	SF	6–1, 6–0		2000	
81	(United States) Lindsay Davenport	2	Zurich Open, Switzerland	Hard (i)	F	6–4, 4–6, 7–5		2000	
82	(Russia) Anna Kournikova	10	Philadelphia Championships, United States	Carpet (i)	QF	6–4, 6–0		2000	
83	(France) Nathalie Tauziat	9	Philadelphia Championships, United States	Carpet (i)	SF	6–1, 6–2		2000	
84	(France) Nathalie Tauziat	9	WTA Tour Championships, United States	Carpet (i)	QF	6–1, 6–7^{(2–7)}, 6–2		2000	
85	(Russia) Anna Kournikova	10	WTA Tour Championships, United States	Carpet (i)	SF	7–6^{(7–2)}, 6–2		2000	
86	(United States) Monica Seles	4	WTA Tour Championships, United States	Carpet (i)	F	6–7^{(5–7)}, 6–4, 6–4		2000	
87	(United States) Serena Williams	6	Sydney International, Australia	Hard	QF	6–4, 7–5		2001	
88	(Spain) Conchita Martínez	5	Sydney International, Australia	Hard	SF	6–3, 6–2		2001	
89	(United States) Lindsay Davenport	2	Sydney International, Australia	Hard	F	6–3, 4–6, 7–5		2001	
90	(United States) Serena Williams	6	Australian Open, Australia	Hard	QF	6–2, 3–6, 8–6		2001	
91	(United States) Venus Williams	3	Australian Open, Australia	Hard	SF	6–1, 6–1		2001	
92	(France) Amélie Mauresmo	9	Charleston Open, United States	Clay	QF	7–5, 6–2		2001	
93	(Spain) Conchita Martínez	8	Charleston Open, United States	Clay	SF	6–2, 6–2		2001	
94	(Belgium) Kim Clijsters	5	Sydney International, Australia	Hard	SF	7–5, 4–6, 6–2		2002	
95	(United States) Monica Seles	10	Australian Open, Australia	Hard	SF	4–6, 6–1, 6–4		2002	
96	(United States) Monica Seles	10	Pan Pacific Open, Japan	Carpet (i)	F	7–6^{(8–6)}, 4–6, 6–3		2002	
97	(United States) Monica Seles	9	Indian Wells Open, United States	Hard	SF	6–3, 6–2		2002	
98	(Russia) Maria Sharapova	4	Pan Pacific Open, Japan	Carpet (i)	SF	6–3, 6–1		2006	
99	(United States) Lindsay Davenport	4	Indian Wells Open, United States	Hard	4R	6–3, 1–6, 6–2		2006	
100	(Russia) Elena Dementieva	8	Berlin Open, Germany	Clay	3R	6–3, 6–2		2006	
101	(Russia) Svetlana Kuznetsova	7	Canadian Open, Canada	Hard	QF	7–6^{(7–4)}, 6–3		2006	
102	(Russia) Nadia Petrova	5	WTA Tour Championships, Spain	Hard (i)	RR	6–4, 3–6, 6–3		2006	
103	(Russia) Elena Dementieva	8	Pan Pacific Open, Japan	Carpet (i)	SF	6–4, 6–3		2007	

== Longest winning streaks ==
=== 37-match win streak (1997) ===
#	Tournament	Tier	Start date	Surface	Rd	Opponent	Rank	Score
–	WTA Tour Championships	Finals	18 November 1996	Carpet (i)	F	(Germany) Steffi Graf (1)	1	3–6, 6–4, 0–6, 6–4, 0–6
1	Sydney International	Tier II	6 January 1997	Hard	2R	(Belgium) Sabine Appelmans	19	6–3, 3–6, 6–1
2	Sydney International	Tier II	6 January 1997	Hard	QF	(Indonesia) Yayuk Basuki	30	7–6^{(8–6)}, 6–1
3	Sydney International	Tier II	6 January 1997	Hard	SF	(United States) Mary Joe Fernández	17	6–3, 6–2
4	Sydney International	Tier II	6 January 1997	Hard	W	(United States) Jennifer Capriati	37	6–1, 5–7, 6–1
5	Australian Open	Grand Slam	13 January 1997	Hard	1R	(Germany) Barbara Rittner	46	6–1, 7–5
6	Australian Open	Grand Slam	13 January 1997	Hard	2R	(United States) Lisa Raymond	26	6–4, 6–2
7	Australian Open	Grand Slam	13 January 1997	Hard	3R	(Austria) Barbara Schett	34	6–2, 6–1
8	Australian Open	Grand Slam	13 January 1997	Hard	4R	(Romania) Ruxandra Dragomir	27	7–6^{(8–6)}, 6–1
9	Australian Open	Grand Slam	13 January 1997	Hard	QF	(Romania) Irina Spîrlea (8)	10	7–5, 6–2
10	Australian Open	Grand Slam	13 January 1997	Hard	SF	(United States) Mary Joe Fernández (14)	17	6–1, 6–3
11	Australian Open	Grand Slam	13 January 1997	Hard	W	(France) Mary Pierce	22	6–2, 6–2
12	Pan Pacific Open	Tier I	28 January 1997	Carpet (i)	2R	(Italy) Gloria Pizzichini	54	6–1, 6–0
13	Pan Pacific Open	Tier I	28 January 1997	Carpet (i)	QF	(South Africa) Amanda Coetzer	12	6–0, 6–1
14	Pan Pacific Open	Tier I	28 January 1997	Carpet (i)	SF	(Germany) Anke Huber (4)	8	6–1, 5–7, 6–2
–	Pan Pacific Open	Tier I	28 January 1997	Carpet (i)	W	(Germany) Steffi Graf (1)	1	Walkover
15	Open Gaz de France	Tier II	10 February 1997	Carpet (i)	2R	(Italy) Silvia Farina	36	6–3, 6–4
16	Open Gaz de France	Tier II	10 February 1997	Carpet (i)	QF	(France) Nathalie Tauziat	23	6–3, 6–2
17	Open Gaz de France	Tier II	10 February 1997	Carpet (i)	SF	(Croatia) Iva Majoli (4)	9	6–1, 6–3
18	Open Gaz de France	Tier II	10 February 1997	Carpet (i)	W	(Germany) Anke Huber (3)	7	6–3, 3–6, 6–3
19	Fed Cup World Group II	Fed Cup	24 February 1997	Carpet (i)	RR	(Slovakia) Karina Habšudová	10	6–2, 6–0
20	Fed Cup World Group II	Fed Cup	24 February 1997	Carpet (i)	RR	(Slovakia) Katarína Studeníková	45	6–1, 6–3
21	Miami Open	Tier I	20 March 1997	Hard	2R	(Canada) Patricia Hy-Boulais	59	3–6, 6–3, 6–2
22	Miami Open	Tier I	20 March 1997	Hard	3R	(United States) Venus Williams (WC)	110	6–4, 6–2
23	Miami Open	Tier I	20 March 1997	Hard	4R	(Russia) Elena Likhovtseva (16)	19	6–3, 2–6, 6–3
24	Miami Open	Tier I	20 March 1997	Hard	QF	(United States) Mary Joe Fernández (10)	12	6–4, 6–1
25	Miami Open	Tier I	20 March 1997	Hard	SF	(Czech Republic) Jana Novotná (3)	4	6–3, 2–6, 6–4
26	Miami Open	Tier I	20 March 1997	Hard	W	(United States) Monica Seles (4)	5	6–2, 6–1
27	Family Circle Cup	Tier I	31 March 1997	Clay	2R	(Germany) Barbara Rittner	41	6–0, 6–4
28	Family Circle Cup	Tier I	31 March 1997	Clay	3R	(Austria) Barbara Schett	36	6–3, 6–3
29	Family Circle Cup	Tier I	31 March 1997	Clay	QF	(Germany) Wiltrud Probst (Q)	126	6–2, 6–0
30	Family Circle Cup	Tier I	31 March 1997	Clay	SF	(Netherlands) Brenda Schultz-McCarthy (14)	18	5–7, 6–3, 6–2
31	Family Circle Cup	Tier I	31 March 1997	Clay	W	(United States) Monica Seles (4)	5	3–6, 6–3, 7–6(7–5)
32	French Open	Grand Slam	26 May 1997	Clay	1R	(Slovakia) Henrieta Nagyová	37	6–0, 6–2
33	French Open	Grand Slam	26 May 1997	Clay	2R	(Italy) Gloria Pizzichini	75	3–6, 6–4, 6–1
34	French Open	Grand Slam	26 May 1997	Clay	3R	(Russia) Anna Kournikova	47	6–1, 6–3
35	French Open	Grand Slam	26 May 1997	Clay	4R	(Austria) Barbara Paulus (16)	18	6–3, 0–6, 6–0
36	French Open	Grand Slam	26 May 1997	Clay	QF	(Spain) Arantxa Sánchez Vicario (6)	6	6–2, 6–2
37	French Open	Grand Slam	26 May 1997	Clay	SF	(United States) Monica Seles (3)	4	6–7^{(2–7)}, 7–5, 6–4
–	French Open	Grand Slam	26 May 1997	Clay	F	(Croatia) Iva Majoli (9)	9	4–6, 2–6

=== 26-match Grand Slam win streak (1997–98) ===
#	Tournament	Start date	Surface	Rd	Opponent	Rank	Score
–	1997 French Open	May 26, 1997	Clay	F	(Croatia) Iva Majoli (9)	9	4–6, 2–6
1	1997 Wimbledon	June 23, 1997	Grass	1R	(Luxembourg) Anne Kremer (Q)	218	6–4, 6–4
2	1997 Wimbledon	June 23, 1997	Grass	2R	(Belarus) Olga Barabanschikova	80	6–2, 6–2
3	1997 Wimbledon	June 23, 1997	Grass	3R	(United States) Nicole Arendt	53	6–1, 6–3
4	1997 Wimbledon	June 23, 1997	Grass	4R	(Belgium) Sabine Appelmans	19	6–3, 6–3
5	1997 Wimbledon	June 23, 1997	Grass	QF	(Czech Republic) Denisa Chládková	57	6–3, 6–2
6	1997 Wimbledon	June 23, 1997	Grass	SF	(Russia) Anna Kournikova	42	6–3, 6–2
7	1997 Wimbledon	June 23, 1997	Grass	W	(Czech Republic) Jana Novotná (3)	3	2–6, 6–3, 6–3
8	1997 US Open	August 25, 1997	Hard	1R	(United States) Tami Whitlinger-Jones	103	6–0, 6–1
9	1997 US Open	August 25, 1997	Hard	2R	(Czech Republic) Denisa Chládková	42	6–1, 6–2
10	1997 US Open	August 25, 1997	Hard	3R	(Russia) Elena Likhovtseva	25	7–5, 6–2
11	1997 US Open	August 25, 1997	Hard	4R	(Argentina) Florencia Labat	40	6–0, 6–2
12	1997 US Open	August 25, 1997	Hard	QF	(Spain) Arantxa Sánchez Vicario (10)	11	6–3, 6–2
13	1997 US Open	August 25, 1997	Hard	SF	(United States) Lindsay Davenport (6)	6	6–2, 6–4
14	1997 US Open	August 25, 1997	Hard	W	(United States) Venus Williams	66	6–0, 6–4
15	1998 Australian Open	January 19, 1998	Hard	1R	(Germany) Wiltrud Probst	80	6–1, 6–2
16	1998 Australian Open	January 19, 1998	Hard	2R	(Germany) Barbara Rittner	73	7–5, 6–1
17	1998 Australian Open	January 19, 1998	Hard	3R	(Russia) Anna Kournikova	29	6–4, 4–6, 6–4
18	1998 Australian Open	January 19, 1998	Hard	4R	(Indonesia) Yayuk Basuki	24	6–0, 6–0
19	1998 Australian Open	January 19, 1998	Hard	QF	(France) Mary Pierce (5)	7	6–2, 6–3
20	1998 Australian Open	January 19, 1998	Hard	SF	(Germany) Anke Huber (10)	14	6–1, 2–6, 6–1
21	1998 Australian Open	January 19, 1998	Hard	W	(Spain) Conchita Martínez (8)	11	6–3, 6–3
22	1998 French Open	May 25, 1998	Clay	1R	(Spain) María Sánchez Lorenzo	67	6–2, 6–1
23	1998 French Open	May 25, 1998	Clay	2R	(Germany) Meike Babel	69	6–1, 6–2
24	1998 French Open	May 25, 1998	Clay	3R	(Slovakia) Karina Habšudová	53	6–4, 6–2
25	1998 French Open	May 25, 1998	Clay	4R	(Israel) Anna Smashnova	72	6–1, 6–2
26	1998 French Open	May 25, 1998	Clay	QF	(United States) Venus Williams (8)	7	6–3, 6–4
–	1998 French Open	May 25, 1998	Clay	SF	(United States) Monica Seles (6)	8	3–6, 2–6
