= 1997 Toshiba Classic =

- Date: July 28 – August 3
- Edition: 19th
- Category: Tier II
- Draw: 28S / 16D
- Prize money: $450,000
- Surface: Hard / outdoor
- Location: San Diego, California, U.S.
- Venue: La Costa Resort and Spa

Champions

Singles
- (Switzerland) Martina Hingis

Doubles
- (Switzerland) Martina Hingis / (Spain) Arantxa Sánchez Vicario
- Southern California Open

The 1997 Toshiba Classic was a women's tennis tournament played on outdoor hardcourts at the La Costa Resort and Spa in San Diego, California, United States, that was part of the Tier II category of the 1997 WTA Tour. It was the 19th edition of the tournament and was held from July 28 through August 3, 1997. First-seeded Martina Hingis won the singles title.

== Finals ==
=== Singles ===
(Switzerland) Martina Hingis defeated (United States) Monica Seles 7–6, 6–4

- It was Hingis' 9th singles title of the year and the 11th of her career.

=== Doubles ===
(Switzerland) Martina Hingis / (Spain) Arantxa Sánchez Vicario defeated (United States) Amy Frazier / (United States) Kimberly Po 6–3, 7–5

- It was Hingis' 5th doubles title of the year and the 8th of her career. It was Sánchez Vicario's 4th doubles title of the year and the 53rd of her career.
