= 1997 Fed Cup World Group play-offs =

The World Group play-offs were four ties which involved the losing nations of the tennis World Group first round and the winning nations of the World Group II. Nations that won their play-off ties entered the 1998 World Group, while losing nations joined the 1998 World Group II.

== Australia vs. Spain ==
Australia
2
Hope Island Resort Tennis Centre, Hope Island, Queensland, Australia
12–13 July 1997
Rebound Ace (outdoors)

Spain
3

			1	2	3
1	(Australia) (Spain)	Rachel McQuillan; Arantxa Sánchez Vicario	2; 6	1; 6
2	(Australia) (Spain)	Annabel Ellwood; Magüi Serna	6; 4	6; 2
3	(Australia) (Spain)	Annabel Ellwood; Arantxa Sánchez Vicario	2; 6	0; 6
4	(Australia) (Spain)	Rachel McQuillan; Magüi Serna	1; 6	3; 6
5	(Australia) (Spain)	Kerry-Anne Guse / Kristine Kunce; María Sánchez Lorenzo / Cristina Torrens Valero	6; 2	6; 4

== Switzerland vs. Argentina ==
Switzerland
5
Hallenstadion, Zürich, Switzerland
12–13 July 1997
Greenset Trophy Carpet (indoors)

Argentina
0

			1	2	3
1	(Switzerland) (Argentina)	Martina Hingis; María José Gaidano	6; 1	6; 2
2	(Switzerland) (Argentina)	Patty Schnyder; Florencia Labat	3; 6	7; 5	10; 8
3	(Switzerland) (Argentina)	Martina Hingis; Florencia Labat	6; 2	6; 1
4	(Switzerland) (Argentina)	Patty Schnyder; María José Gaidano	6; 1	6; 0
5	(Switzerland) (Argentina)	Emmanuelle Gagliardi / Martina Hingis; Laura Montalvo / Mercedes Paz	6; 3	6; 4

== Germany vs. Croatia ==
Germany
3
Walstadion Tennis Club, Frankfurt, Germany
12–13 July 1997
Supreme carpet (outdoors)

Croatia
2

			1	2	3
1	(Germany) (Croatia)	Meike Babel; Iva Majoli	2; 6	3; 6
2	(Germany) (Croatia)	Anke Huber; Mirjana Lučić	6; 2	6; 2
3	(Germany) (Croatia)	Anke Huber; Iva Majoli	6^{4} 7^{7}	6; 2	6; 0
4	(Germany) (Croatia)	Meike Babel; Mirjana Lučić	4; 6	1; 6
5	(Germany) (Croatia)	Meike Babel / Anke Huber; Mirjana Lučić / Iva Majoli	7^{7} 6^{4}	6^{4} 7^{7}	6; 1

== United States vs. Japan ==
United States
5
Longwood Cricket Club, Chestnut Hill, Massachusetts, United States
12–13 July 1997
DecoTurf (outdoors)

Japan
0

			1	2	3
1	(United States) (Japan)	Mary Joe Fernández; Ai Sugiyama	4; 6	6; 2	6; 2
2	(United States) (Japan)	Lindsay Davenport; Naoko Sawamatsu	6; 1	6; 3
3	(United States) (Japan)	Lindsay Davenport; Ai Sugiyama	6; 4	7^{7} 6^{1}
4	(United States) (Japan)	Kimberly Po; Naoko Sawamatsu	6; 2	6; 4
5	(United States) (Japan)	Lindsay Davenport / Lisa Raymond; Naoko Kijimuta / Nana Miyagi	6; 4	6; 4

== See also ==
- Fed Cup structure
