= 1996 WTA Tour Championships – Singles =

Singles
- 1996 Chase Championships

Final
- Champion: (Germany) Steffi Graf
- Runner-up: (Switzerland) Martina Hingis
- Score: 6–3, 4–6, 6–0, 4–6, 6–0

Details
- Draw: 16
- Seeds: 8

Events
Singles	Doubles
← 1995 ·	Chase Championships	· 1997 →

Defending champion Steffi Graf successfully defended her title, defeating Martina Hingis in the final, 6–3, 4–6, 6–0, 4–6, 6–0 to win the singles tennis title at the 1996 WTA Tour Championships. It was her fifth and last Tour Finals singles title.

== Seeds ==
A champion seed is indicated in bold text while text in italics indicates the round in which that seed was eliminated.

1. (Germany) **Steffi Graf (champion)**
2. (United States) Monica Seles (first round)
3. (Spain) Arantxa Sánchez Vicario (quarterfinals)
4. (Spain) Conchita Martínez (quarterfinals)
5. (Czech Republic) Jana Novotná (semifinals)
6. (Germany) Anke Huber (first round)
7. (Switzerland) Martina Hingis (final)
8. (United States) Lindsay Davenport (quarterfinals)

== Draw ==
=== Key ===
- Q = Qualifier
- WC = Wild card
- LL = Lucky loser
- Alt = Alternate
- SE = Special exempt
- PR = Protected ranking
- ITF = ITF entry
- JE = Junior exempt
- w/o = Walkover
- r = Retired
- d = Defaulted
- SR = Special ranking
- NB: The Final was the best of 5 sets while all other rounds were the best of 3 sets.

First round
1	(Germany) **S Graf**	**6**	**6**
(Slovakia) K Habšudová	1	4
(Austria) B Paulus	3	2
8	(United States) **L Davenport**	**6**	**6**
3	(Spain) **A Sánchez**	**6**	**7**
(Netherlands) B Schultz-McCarthy	4	6
(South Africa) A Coetzer	4	1
5	(Czech Republic) **J Novotná**	**6**	**6**
6	(Germany) A Huber	5	2
(Croatia) **I Majoli**	**7**	**6**
(Austria) J Wiesner	1	**6**	4
4	(Spain) **C Martínez**	**6**	3	**6**
7	(Switzerland) **M Hingis**	**6**	**6**
(Romania) I Spîrlea	2	1
(Japan) **K Date**	5
2	(United States) M Seles	4	r

Quarterfinals
1	(Germany) **S Graf**	**6**	**7**
8	(United States) L Davenport	4	6
3	(Spain) A Sánchez	0	3
5	(Czech Republic) **J Novotná**	**6**	**6**
(Croatia) **I Majoli**	**7**	**7**
4	(Spain) C Martínez	6	6
7	(Switzerland) **M Hingis**	**6**	**6**
(Japan) K Date	1	2

Semifinals
1	(Germany) **S Graf**	4	**6**	**6**
5	(Czech Republic) J Novotná	**6**	4	3
(Croatia) I Majoli	2	**6**	1
7	(Switzerland) **M Hingis**	**6**	4	**6**

Final
1	(Germany) **S Graf**	**6**	4	**6**	4	**6**
7	(Switzerland) M Hingis	3	**6**	0	**6**	0

== See also ==
- WTA Tour Championships appearances
