= 1997 Toshiba Classic – Singles =

Singles
- 1997 Toshiba Classic

Final
- Champion: (Switzerland) Martina Hingis
- Runner-up: (United States) Monica Seles
- Score: 7–6, 6–4

Details
- Draw: 28
- Seeds: 8

Events
Singles	Doubles
- Toshiba Classic

Kimiko Date was the defending champion but she had retired at the end of the previous year.

Martina Hingis won in the final 7–6, 6–4 against Monica Seles.

== Seeds ==
A champion seed is indicated in bold text while text in italics indicates the round in which that seed was eliminated. The top four seeds received a bye to the second round.

1. (Switzerland) **Martina Hingis (champion)**
2. (United States) Monica Seles (final)
3. (South Africa) Amanda Coetzer (semifinals)
4. (Spain) Arantxa Sánchez Vicario (second round)
5. (Germany) Anke Huber (second round)
6. (France) Mary Pierce (semifinals)
7. (Spain) Conchita Martínez (quarterfinals)
8. (Romania) Irina Spîrlea (second round)

== Draw ==
Key

- Q = Qualifier
- WC = Wild card
- LL = Lucky loser
- Alt = Alternate
- ITF = ITF entry
- PR = Protected ranking
- SR = Special ranking
- SE = Special exempt
- JE = Junior exempt
- JR = Junior Accelerator Programme entrant
- CO = College Accelerator Programme entrant
- NG = Next Gen Accelerator Program entrant
- w/o = Walkover
- r = Retired
- d = Defaulted

=== Final ===
Final
1	(Switzerland) **Martina Hingis**	**7**	**6**
2	(United States) Monica Seles	6	4

=== Section 1 ===
First round
Q	(United States) **V Williams**	**6**	**6**
(Argentina) F Labat	3	2
(Czech Republic) **H Suková**	**7**	**3**
(United States) C Rubin	5	0	r
(United States) L Raymond	3	**6**	1
7	(Spain) **C Martínez**	**6**	3	**6**
(Sweden) Å Carlsson	1	2
(France) **S Testud**	**6**	**6**
Q	(Italy) R Grande	5	1
(France) **N Tauziat**	**7**	**6**
(United States) A Frazier	3	**7**	3
6	(France) **M Pierce**	**6**	6	**6**

Second round
1	(Switzerland) **M Hingis**	**6**	**6**
Q	(United States) V Williams	2	1
(Czech Republic) H Suková	1	0
7	(Spain) **C Martínez**	**6**	**6**
WC/4	(Spain) A Sánchez Vicario	1	2
(France) **S Testud**	**6**	**6**
(France) N Tauziat	2	1
6	(France) **M Pierce**	**6**	**6**

Quarterfinals
1	(Switzerland) **M Hingis**	**6**	**6**
7	(Spain) C Martínez	4	4
(France) S Testud	3	2
6	(France) **M Pierce**	**6**	**6**

Semifinals
1	(Switzerland) **M Hingis**	**6**	**6**
6	(France) M Pierce	0	2

=== Section 2 ===
First round
5	(Germany) **A Huber**	**7**	1	**6**
(Bulgaria) M Maleeva	5	**6**	3
(Indonesia) **Y Basuki**	**6**	**6**
Q	(United States) A Miller	1	3
Q	(Australia) S Drake-Brockman	5	3
(France) **A-G Sidot**	**7**	**6**
8	(Romania) **I Spîrlea**	**6**	**6**
(Russia) E Likhovtseva	3	3
(Belarus) **N Zvereva**	**7**	2	**6**
(United States) K Po	6	**6**	1
(Japan) **A Sugiyama**	**6**	**6**
WC	(United States) A Stevenson	3	1

Second round
5	(Germany) A Huber	2	**6**	2
(Indonesia) **Y Basuki**	**6**	2	**6**
(France) A-G Sidot	2	1
3	(South Africa) **A Coetzer**	**6**	**6**
8	(Romania) I Spîrlea	2	0
(Belarus) **N Zvereva**	**6**	**6**
(Japan) A Sugiyama	4	4
2	(United States) **M Seles**	**6**	**6**

Quarterfinals
(Indonesia) Y Basuki	3	4
3	(South Africa) **A Coetzer**	**6**	**6**
(Belarus) N Zvereva	1	3
2	(United States) **M Seles**	**6**	**6**

Semifinals
3	(South Africa) A Coetzer	3	4
2	(United States) **M Seles**	**6**	**6**
