= 1997 Fed Cup World Group II =

International women's tennis competition

The World Group II was the second highest level of Fed Cup competition in 1997. Winning nations advanced to the World Group play-offs, and the losing nations were demoted to the World Group II play-offs.

== Croatia vs. Austria ==
Croatia
4
Dom Sportova, Zagreb, Croatia
1–2 March 1997
Greenset hard (indoors)

Austria
1

			1	2	3
1	(Croatia) (Austria)	Iva Majoli; Barbara Schett	7; 5	4; 6	6; 2
2	(Croatia) (Austria)	Mirjana Lučić; Judith Wiesner	7; 5	6; 1
3	(Croatia) (Austria)	Iva Majoli; Judith Wiesner	4; 6	4; 6
4	(Croatia) (Austria)	Mirjana Lučić; Barbara Schett	6; 2	5; 7	7; 5
5	(Croatia) (Austria)	Mirjana Lučić / Maja Murić; Karin Kschwendt / Marion Maruska	6; 4	6; 3

== Slovakia vs. Switzerland ==
Slovakia
2
Mestska Hall, Košice, Slovakia
1–2 March 1997
Supreme carpet (indoors)

Switzerland
3

			1	2	3
1	(Slovakia) (Switzerland)	Katarína Studeníková; Martina Hingis	1; 6	3; 6
2	(Slovakia) (Switzerland)	Karina Habšudová; Patty Schnyder	7; 5	6; 1
3	(Slovakia) (Switzerland)	Karina Habšudová; Martina Hingis	2; 6	0; 6
4	(Slovakia) (Switzerland)	Henrieta Nagyová; Patty Schnyder	6; 3	6; 1
5	(Slovakia) (Switzerland)	Karina Habšudová / Radka Zrubáková; Martina Hingis / Patty Schnyder	0; 6	1; 6

== South Korea vs. Argentina ==
South Korea
1
Seoul Olympic Park Tennis Center, Seoul, South Korea
1–2 March 1997
Rebound Ace (outdoors)

Argentina
4

			1	2	3
1	(South Korea) (Argentina)	Park Sung-hee; Mariana Díaz Oliva	6; 3	6; 1
2	(South Korea) (Argentina)	Cho Yoon-jeong; Florencia Labat	1; 6	2; 6
3	(South Korea) (Argentina)	Park Sung-hee; Florencia Labat	4; 6	1; 6
4	(South Korea) (Argentina)	Kim Eun-ha; Mariana Díaz Oliva	6; 4	3; 6	1; 6
5	(South Korea) (Argentina)	Kim Eun-ha / Park Sung-hee; Laura Montalvo / Mercedes Paz	7^{7} 6^{3}	4; 6	6^{2} 7^{7}

== South Africa vs. Australia ==
South Africa
2
Westbridge Park Stadium, Durban, South Africa
1–2 March 1997
DecoTurf (outdoors)

Australia
3

			1	2	3
1	(South Africa) (Australia)	Joannette Kruger; Annabel Ellwood	4; 6	3; 6
2	(South Africa) (Australia)	Amanda Coetzer; Rachel McQuillan	3; 6	6^{10} 7^{12}
3	(South Africa) (Australia)	Amanda Coetzer; Annabel Ellwood	1; 6	6; 1	6; 0
4	(South Africa) (Australia)	Joannette Kruger; Rachel McQuillan	5; 7	4; 6
5	(South Africa) (Australia)	Mariaan de Swardt / Rosalyn Nideffer; Kerry-Anne Guse / Kristine Kunce	6; 3	7; 5

== See also ==
- Fed Cup structure
