= 1997 Toshiba Classic – Doubles =

Doubles
- 1997 Toshiba Classic

Final
- Champions: (Switzerland) Martina Hingis (Spain) Arantxa Sánchez Vicario
- Runners-up: (United States) Amy Frazier (United States) Kimberly Po
- Score: 6–3, 7–5

Details
- Draw: 16
- Seeds: 4

Events
Singles	Doubles
- Toshiba Classic

Gigi Fernández and Conchita Martínez were the defending champions but they competed with different partners that year, Fernández with Natasha Zvereva and Martínez with Patricia Tarabini.

Fernández and Zvereva lost in the first round to Amy Frazier and Kimberly Po.

Martínez and Tarabini lost in the quarterfinals to Frazier and Po.

Martina Hingis and Arantxa Sánchez Vicario won in the final 6–3, 7–5 against Frazier and Po.

== Seeds ==
Champion seeds are indicated in bold text while text in italics indicates the round in which those seeds were eliminated.

1. (United States) Gigi Fernández / (Belarus) Natasha Zvereva (first round)
2. (Switzerland) **Martina Hingis** / (Spain) **Arantxa Sánchez Vicario (champions)**
3. (United States) Nicole Arendt / (Netherlands) Manon Bollegraf (first round)
4. (Latvia) Larisa Savchenko / (Czech Republic) Helena Suková (quarterfinals)

== Draw ==
Key

- Q = Qualifier
- WC = Wild card
- LL = Lucky loser
- Alt = Alternate
- ITF = ITF entry
- PR = Protected ranking
- SR = Special ranking
- SE = Special exempt
- JE = Junior exempt
- JR = Junior Accelerator Programme entrant
- CO = College Accelerator Programme entrant
- NG = Next Gen Accelerator Program entrant
- w/o = Walkover
- r = Retired
- d = Defaulted

First round
1	(United States) G Fernández (Belarus) N Zvereva	3	4
(United States) **A Frazier** (United States) **K Po**	**6**	**6**
(Japan) R Hiraki (Argentina) F Labat	5	**7**	5
(Spain) **C Martínez** (Argentina) **P Tarabini**	**7**	5	**7**
3	(United States) N Arendt (Netherlands) M Bollegraf	6	4
Q	(Thailand) **T Tanasugarn** (Japan) **Y Yoshida**	**7**	**6**
LL	(Sweden) Å Carlsson (France) A-G Sidot	1	4
(France) **N Tauziat** (United States) **L Wild**	**6**	**6**
(United States) **K Adams** (United States) **D Graham**	**7**	6	**6**
(Italy) R Grande (Russia) E Likhovtseva	5	**7**	3
(United States) L Raymond (Australia) R Stubbs	5	**6**	3
4	(Latvia) **L Savchenko** (Czech Republic) **H Suková**	**7**	3	**6**
(Indonesia) **Y Basuki** (Netherlands) **C Vis**	**6**	2	**7**
(United States) L McNeil (Romania) I Spîrlea	4	**6**	6
(Japan) N Kijimuta (Japan) N Miyagi	2	1
2	(Switzerland) **M Hingis** (Spain) **A Sánchez Vicario**	**6**	**6**

Quarterfinals
(United States) **A Frazier** (United States) **K Po**	**7**	**7**
(Spain) C Martínez (Argentina) P Tarabini	5	5
Q	(Thailand) T Tanasugarn (Japan) Y Yoshida	1	4
(France) **N Tauziat** (United States) **L Wild**	**6**	**6**
(United States) **K Adams** (United States) **D Graham**	**6**	**6**
4	(Latvia) L Savchenko (Czech Republic) H Suková	2	3
(Indonesia) Y Basuki (Netherlands) C Vis	3	3
2	(Switzerland) **M Hingis** (Spain) **A Sánchez Vicario**	**6**	**6**

Semifinals
(United States) **A Frazier** (United States) **K Po**	**6**	**6**
(France) N Tauziat (United States) L Wild	2	3
(United States) K Adams (United States) D Graham	4	2
2	(Switzerland) **M Hingis** (Spain) **A Sánchez Vicario**	**6**	**6**

Final
(United States) Amy Frazier (United States) Kimberly Po	3	5
2	(Switzerland) **Martina Hingis** (Spain) **Arantxa Sánchez Vicario**	**6**	**7**
