= 1998 Fed Cup World Group =

Part of tennis tournament

- Date: 18 April – 20 September
- Edition: 8th

Champions
- Spain
← 1997 ·	Fed Cup	· 1999 →

The World Group was the highest level of Fed Cup competition in 1998. Eight nations competed in a three-round knockout competition. France was the defending champion, but they were defeated in the semifinals by Switzerland. Spain defeated Switzerland to capture their fifth title.

== Participating teams ==
Participating teams
Belgium	Czech Republic	France	Germany
Netherlands	Spain	Switzerland	United States

== Draw ==
Quarterfinals; 18–19 April
Ghent, Belgium (Indoor hard)
1	France	3
Belgium	2
Brno, Czech Republic (Indoor carpet)
Switzerland	4
4	Czech Republic	1
Saarbrücken, Germany (Indoor carpet)
3	Spain	3
Germany	2
Kiawah Island, SC, USA (Outdoor clay)
United States	5
2	Netherlands	0

Semifinals; 25–26 July
Sion, Switzerland (Outdoor clay)
1	France	0
Switzerland	5
Madrid, Spain (Outdoor clay)
3	Spain	3
United States	2

Final; 19–20 September
Geneva, Switzerland (Indoor hard)
Switzerland	2
3	Spain	3

== First round ==
=== France vs. Belgium ===
France
3
Expo Centre, Ghent, Belgium
18–19 April 1998
Greenset hard (indoors)

Belgium
2

			1	2	3
1	(France) (Belgium)	Sandrine Testud; Sabine Appelmans	6; 3	6; 2
2	(France) (Belgium)	Sarah Pitkowski; Dominique Van Roost	6; 4	4; 6	2; 6
3	(France) (Belgium)	Sandrine Testud; Dominique Van Roost	5; 7	6^{7} 7^{9}
4	(France) (Belgium)	Sarah Pitkowski; Sabine Appelmans	4; 6	6; 3	6; 1
5	(France) (Belgium)	Alexandra Fusai / Nathalie Tauziat; Els Callens / Laurence Courtois	6; 4	6; 0

=== Switzerland vs. Czech Republic ===
Switzerland
4
Rondo Hall, Brno, Czech Republic
18–19 April 1998
Supreme carpet (indoors)

Czech Republic
1

			1	2	3
1	(Switzerland) (Czech Republic)	Patty Schnyder; Jana Novotná	6; 3	2; 6	3; 6
2	(Switzerland) (Czech Republic)	Martina Hingis; Adriana Gerši	6; 2	6; 1
3	(Switzerland) (Czech Republic)	Martina Hingis; Jana Novotná	4; 6	6; 3	6; 2
4	(Switzerland) (Czech Republic)	Patty Schnyder; Adriana Gerši	6; 3	6; 3
5	(Switzerland) (Czech Republic)	Martina Hingis / Patty Schnyder; Denisa Chládková / Ludmila Richterová	6; 0	6; 1

=== Spain vs. Germany ===
Spain
3
Saarland Hall, Saarbrücken, Germany
18–19 April 1998
Supreme carpet (indoors)

Germany
2

			1	2	3
1	(Spain) (Germany)	Magüi Serna; Andrea Glass	6; 3	6^{3} 7^{7}	6; 3
2	(Spain) (Germany)	Conchita Martínez; Jana Kandarr	1; 6	6; 1	5; 7
3	(Spain) (Germany)	Conchita Martínez; Andrea Glass	6; 3	3; 6	2; 6
4	(Spain) (Germany)	Magüi Serna; Jana Kandarr	6; 3	6; 4
5	(Spain) (Germany)	Conchita Martínez / Magüi Serna; Andrea Glass / Wiltrud Probst	6; 4	7^{7} 6^{5}

=== United States vs. Netherlands ===
United States
5
East Beach T.C., Kiawah Island, SC, United States
18–19 April 1998
Har-Tru clay (outdoors)

Netherlands
0

			1	2	3
1	(United States) (Netherlands)	Lindsay Davenport; Amanda Hopmans	6; 4	6; 1
2	(United States) (Netherlands)	Monica Seles; Miriam Oremans	6; 1	6; 2
3	(United States) (Netherlands)	Lindsay Davenport; Miriam Oremans	6; 1	6; 2
4	(United States) (Netherlands)	Monica Seles; Amanda Hopmans	6; 1	6; 2
5	(United States) (Netherlands)	Mary Joe Fernández / Lisa Raymond; Manon Bollegraf / Caroline Vis	6; 1			retired

== Semifinals ==
=== France vs. Switzerland ===
France
0
Tourbillon Stadium, Sion, Switzerland
25–26 July 1998
Red clay (outdoors)

Switzerland
5

			1	2	3
1	(France) (Switzerland)	Julie Halard-Decugis; Martina Hingis	5; 7	1; 6
2	(France) (Switzerland)	Amélie Mauresmo; Patty Schnyder	5; 7	6; 2	3; 6
3	(France) (Switzerland)	Amélie Mauresmo; Martina Hingis	7^{8} 6^{6}	4; 6	2; 6
4	(France) (Switzerland)	Julie Halard-Decugis; Patty Schnyder	3; 6	2; 6
5	(France) (Switzerland)	Alexandra Fusai / Nathalie Tauziat; Emmanuelle Gagliardi / Patty Schnyder	6; 2	3; 6	3; 6

=== Spain vs. United States ===
Spain
3
Campo Villa T.C., Madrid, Spain
25–26 July 1998
Red clay (outdoors)

United States
2

			1	2	3
1	(Spain) (United States)	Arantxa Sánchez Vicario; Lisa Raymond	6^{4} 7^{7}	6; 3	6; 0
2	(Spain) (United States)	Conchita Martínez; Monica Seles	3; 6	6; 3	1; 6
3	(Spain) (United States)	Arantxa Sánchez Vicario; Monica Seles	4; 6	0; 6
4	(Spain) (United States)	Conchita Martínez; Lisa Raymond	7^{7} 6^{1}	6; 4
5	(Spain) (United States)	Conchita Martínez / Arantxa Sánchez Vicario; Mary Joe Fernández / Lisa Raymond	6; 4	6^{5} 7^{7}	11; 9

== Final ==
=== Switzerland vs. Spain ===
Switzerland
2
Palexpo Hall, Geneva, Switzerland
19–20 September 1998
Greenset hard (indoors)

Spain
3

			1	2	3
1	(Switzerland) (Spain)	Patty Schnyder; Arantxa Sánchez Vicario	2; 6	6; 3	2; 6
2	(Switzerland) (Spain)	Martina Hingis; Conchita Martínez	6; 4	6; 4
3	(Switzerland) (Spain)	Martina Hingis; Arantxa Sánchez Vicario	7^{7} 6^{5}	6; 3
4	(Switzerland) (Spain)	Patty Schnyder; Conchita Martínez	3; 6	6; 2	7; 9
5	(Switzerland) (Spain)	Martina Hingis / Patty Schnyder; Conchita Martínez / Arantxa Sánchez Vicario	0; 6	2; 6

1998 Fed Cup Champions
(Spain)
Spain
Fifth title

== See also ==
- Fed Cup structure
