= 1997 Fed Cup World Group =

Part of tennis tournament

- Date: 1 March – 5 October
- Edition: 7th

Champions
- France
- Fed Cup

The World Group was the highest level of Fed Cup competition in 1997. Eight nations competed in a three-round knockout competition. United States was the defending champion, but they were defeated in the first round by the Netherlands. France ended up capturing their first title, defeating the Netherlands in the final.

== Participating teams ==
Participating teams
Belgium	Czech Republic	France	Germany
Japan	Netherlands	Spain	United States

== Draw ==
Quarterfinals; 1–2 March
Haarlem, Netherlands (Indoor carpet)
1	United States	2
Netherlands	3
Mannheim, Germany (Indoor hard)
Czech Republic	3
3	Germany	2
Tokyo, Japan (Indoor hard)
4	France	4
Japan	1
Sprimont, Belgium (Indoor hard)
Belgium	5
2	Spain	0

Semifinals; 12–13 July
Prague, Czech Republic (Outdoor clay)
Netherlands	3
Czech Republic	2
Nice, France (Outdoor clay)
4	France	3
Belgium	2

Final; 4–5 October
's-Hertogenbosch, Netherlands (Indoor carpet)
Netherlands	1
4	France	4

== First round ==
=== United States vs. Netherlands ===
United States
2
Haarlem Sports Centre, Haarlem, Netherlands
1–2 March 1997
Supreme carpet (indoors)

Netherlands
3

			1	2	3
1	(United States) (Netherlands)	Mary Joe Fernández; Miriam Oremans	1; 6	4; 6
2	(United States) (Netherlands)	Chanda Rubin; Brenda Schultz-McCarthy	4; 6	6; 4	6; 3
3	(United States) (Netherlands)	Mary Joe Fernández; Brenda Schultz-McCarthy	6; 1	4; 6	7; 9
4	(United States) (Netherlands)	Chanda Rubin; Miriam Oremans	3; 6	0; 6
5	(United States) (Netherlands)	Gigi Fernández / Kimberly Po; Manon Bollegraf / Kristie Boogert	6; 3	6; 2

=== Czech Republic vs. Germany ===
Czech Republic
3
May Market Hall, Mannheim, Germany
1–2 March 1997
DecoTurf (indoors)

Germany
2

			1	2	3
1	(Czech Republic) (Germany)	Ludmila Richterová; Marlene Weingärtner	6; 3	5; 7	3; 6
2	(Czech Republic) (Germany)	Adriana Gerši; Barbara Rittner	6; 4	6; 2
3	(Czech Republic) (Germany)	Ludmila Richterová; Barbara Rittner	6; 1	6; 4
4	(Czech Republic) (Germany)	Adriana Gerši; Marlene Weingärtner	6; 2	6; 2
5	(Czech Republic) (Germany)	Eva Martincová / Ludmila Richterová; Barbara Rittner / Elena Wagner	6^{3} 7^{7}	2; 6

=== France vs. Japan ===
France
4
Ariake Coliseum, Tokyo, Japan
1–2 March 1997
DecoTurf (indoors)

Japan
1

			1	2	3
1	(France) (Japan)	Mary Pierce; Naoko Sawamatsu	6; 0	7^{7} 6^{4}
2	(France) (Japan)	Nathalie Tauziat; Ai Sugiyama	4; 6	7; 5	6; 4
3	(France) (Japan)	Mary Pierce; Ai Sugiyama	5; 7	7^{9} 6^{7}	4; 6
4	(France) (Japan)	Nathalie Tauziat; Naoko Sawamatsu	7; 5	4; 6	17; 15
5	(France) (Japan)	Alexandra Fusai / Anne-Gaëlle Sidot; Naoko Kijimuta / Kyoko Nagatsuka	7; 5	6; 4

- This tie holds the Fed Cup record for the most games, with 162.

=== Belgium vs. Spain ===
Belgium
5
Tennissimo, Sprimont, Belgium
1–2 March 1997
Greenset (indoors)

Spain
0

			1	2	3
1	(Belgium) (Spain)	Els Callens; Arantxa Sánchez Vicario	6; 3	7^{7} 6^{4}
2	(Belgium) (Spain)	Sabine Appelmans; Magüi Serna	6; 1	4; 6	6; 3
3	(Belgium) (Spain)	Sabine Appelmans; Arantxa Sánchez Vicario	6; 3	2; 6	8; 6
4	(Belgium) (Spain)	Els Callens; Magüi Serna	6; 1	6; 3
5	(Belgium) (Spain)	Els Callens / Nancy Feber; Gala León García / Virginia Ruano Pascual	5; 7	6; 2	6; 2

== Semifinals ==
=== Czech Republic vs. Netherlands ===
Czech Republic
2
I. Czech Lawn Tennis Club, Prague, Czech Republic
12–13 July 1997
Red clay (outdoors)

Netherlands
3

			1	2	3
1	(Czech Republic) (Netherlands)	Sandra Kleinová; Brenda Schultz-McCarthy	1; 6	6^{5} 7^{7}
2	(Czech Republic) (Netherlands)	Jana Novotná; Miriam Oremans	6; 3	6; 0
3	(Czech Republic) (Netherlands)	Jana Novotná; Brenda Schultz-McCarthy	7^{7} 6^{3}	6; 3
4	(Czech Republic) (Netherlands)	Adriana Gerši; Miriam Oremans	6; 1	2; 6	7; 9
5	(Czech Republic) (Netherlands)	Eva Martincová / Jana Novotná; Manon Bollegraf / Miriam Oremans	4; 6	6^{5} 7^{7}

=== France vs. Belgium ===
France
3
Nice Lawn Tennis Club, Nice, France
12–13 July 1997
Red clay (outdoors)

Belgium
2

			1	2	3
1	(France) (Belgium)	Alexandra Fusai; Sabine Appelmans	6^{1} 7^{7}	6; 3	6; 1
2	(France) (Belgium)	Sandrine Testud; Dominique Van Roost	6; 4	5; 7	4; 6
3	(France) (Belgium)	Sandrine Testud; Sabine Appelmans	6; 2	6; 4
4	(France) (Belgium)	Alexandra Fusai; Dominique Van Roost	3; 6	3; 6
5	(France) (Belgium)	Alexandra Fusai / Nathalie Tauziat; Els Callens / Dominique Van Roost	3; 6	6; 2	7; 5

== Final ==
=== Netherlands vs. France ===
Netherlands
1
Brabant Hall, 's-Hertogenbosch, Netherlands
4–5 October 1997
Supreme carpet (indoors)

France
4

			1	2	3
1	(Netherlands) (France)	Brenda Schultz-McCarthy; Sandrine Testud	4; 6	6; 4	3; 6
2	(Netherlands) (France)	Miriam Oremans; Mary Pierce	4; 6	1; 6
3	(Netherlands) (France)	Brenda Schultz-McCarthy; Mary Pierce	4; 6	6; 3	6; 4
4	(Netherlands) (France)	Miriam Oremans; Sandrine Testud	6; 0	3; 6	3; 6
5	(Netherlands) (France)	Manon Bollegraf / Caroline Vis; Alexandra Fusai / Nathalie Tauziat	3; 6	4; 6

1997 Fed Cup Champions
(France)
France
First title

== See also ==
- Fed Cup structure
