= 2002 Tennis Masters Series =

Men's professional tennis tour

Details
- Duration: March 6 – November 3
- Edition: 13th
- Tournaments: 9

Achievements (singles)
- Most titles: (United States) Andre Agassi (3)
- Most finals: (United States) Andre Agassi (Australia) Lleyton Hewitt (3)

The table below shows the 2002 Tennis Masters Series schedule.

The ATP Masters Series are part of the elite tour for professional men's tennis organised by the Association of Tennis Professionals.

== Results ==
* First-time champion

Masters	Singles champions	Runners-up	Score	Doubles champions	Runners-up	Score
Indian Wells Singles – Doubles	(Australia) Lleyton Hewitt*	(United Kingdom) Tim Henman	6–1, 6–2	(The Bahamas) Mark Knowles (Canada) Daniel Nestor	(Switzerland) Roger Federer (Belarus) Max Mirnyi	6–4, 6–4
Miami Singles – Doubles	(United States) Andre Agassi	(Switzerland) Roger Federer	6–3, 6–3, 3–6, 6–4	(The Bahamas) Mark Knowles (Canada) Daniel Nestor	(United States) Donald Johnson (United States) Jared Palmer	6–3, 3–6, 6–1
Monte Carlo Singles – Doubles	(Spain) Juan Carlos Ferrero	(Spain) Carlos Moyà	7–5, 6–3, 6–4	(Sweden) Jonas Björkman (Australia) Todd Woodbridge	(Netherlands) Paul Haarhuis (Russia) Yevgeny Kafelnikov	6–3, 3–6, [10–7]
Rome Singles – Doubles	(United States) Andre Agassi	(Germany) Tommy Haas	6–3, 6–3, 6–0	(Czech Republic) Martin Damm (Czech Republic) Cyril Suk	(Zimbabwe) Wayne Black (Zimbabwe) Kevin Ullyett	7–5, 7–5
Hamburg Singles – Doubles	(Switzerland) Roger Federer*	(Russia) Marat Safin	6–1, 6–3, 6–4	(India) Mahesh Bhupathi	(Sweden) Jonas Björkman (Australia) Todd Woodbridge	6–2, 6–4
Hamburg Singles – Doubles	(Switzerland) Roger Federer*	(Russia) Marat Safin	6–1, 6–3, 6–4	(United States) Jan-Michael Gambill*	(Sweden) Jonas Björkman (Australia) Todd Woodbridge	6–2, 6–4
Toronto Singles – Doubles	(Argentina) Guillermo Cañas*	(United States) Andy Roddick	6–4, 7–5	(United States) Bob Bryan* (United States) Mike Bryan*	(The Bahamas) Mark Knowles (Canada) Daniel Nestor	4–6, 7–6^{(7–1)}, 6–3
Cincinnati Singles – Doubles	(Spain) Carlos Moyà	(Australia) Lleyton Hewitt	7–5, 7–6^{(7–5)}	(United States) James Blake* (United States) Todd Martin*	(India) Mahesh Bhupathi (Belarus) Max Mirnyi	7–5, 6–3
Madrid Singles – Doubles	(United States) Andre Agassi	(Czech Republic) Jiří Novák	W/O	(The Bahamas) Mark Knowles (Canada) Daniel Nestor	(India) Mahesh Bhupathi (Belarus) Max Mirnyi	6–3, 5–7, 6–0
Paris Singles – Doubles	(Russia) Marat Safin	(Australia) Lleyton Hewitt	7–6^{(7–4)}, 6–0, 6–4	(France) Nicolas Escudé* (France) Fabrice Santoro*	(Brazil) Gustavo Kuerten (France) Cédric Pioline	6–3, 6–3

== Titles Champions ==
=== Singles ===
#	Player	IN	MI	MO	HA	RO	CA	CI	MA	PA	#	Winning span
	(United States) Andre Agassi	1	5	-	-	1	3	2	1	2	15	1990–2002 (13)
	(United States) Pete Sampras	2	3	-	-	1	-	3	-	2	11	1992–2000 (9)
	(Austria) Thomas Muster	-	1	3	-	3	-	-	1	-	8	1990–1997 (8)
	(United States) Michael Chang	3	1	-	-	-	1	2	-	-	7	1990–1997 (8)
	(United States) Jim Courier	2	1	-	-	2	-	-	-	-	5	1991–1993 (3)
	(Germany) Boris Becker	-	-	-	-	-	-	-	4	1	5	1990–1996 (7)
	(Brazil) Gustavo Kuerten	-	-	2	1	1	-	1	-	-	5	1999–2001 (3)
	(Chile) Marcelo Ríos	1	1	1	1	1	-	-	-	-	5	1997–1999 (3)
	(Sweden) Stefan Edberg	1	-	-	1	-	-	1	-	1	4	1990–1992 (3)
	(Ukraine) Andrei Medvedev	-	-	1	3	-	-	-	-	-	4	1994–1997 (4)
	(Sweden) Thomas Enqvist	-	-	-	-	-	-	1	1	1	3	1996–2000 (5)
	(Russia) Marat Safin	-	-	-	-	-	1	-	-	2	3	2000–2002 (3)
	(Spain) Sergi Bruguera	-	-	2	-	-	-	-	-	-	2	1991–1993 (3)
	(Russia) Andrei Chesnokov	-	-	1	-	-	1	-	-	-	2	1990–1991 (2)
	(Spain) Àlex Corretja	1	-	-	-	1	-	-	-	-	2	1997–2000 (4)
	(South Africa) Wayne Ferreira	-	-	-	-	-	1	-	1	-	2	1996–2000 (5)
	(Spain) Juan Carlos Ferrero	-	-	1	-	1	-	-	-	-	2	2001–2002 (2)
	(France) Guy Forget	-	-	-	-	-	-	1	-	1	2	1991
	(Croatia) Goran Ivanišević	-	-	-	-	-	-	-	1	1	2	1992–1993 (2)
	(Netherlands) Richard Krajicek	-	1	-	-	-	-	-	1	-	2	1998–1999 (2)
	(Spain) Carlos Moyá	-	-	1	-	-	-	1	-	-	2	1998–2002 (5)
	(Australia) Patrick Rafter	-	-	-	-	-	1	1	-	-	2	1998
	(Germany) Michael Stich	-	-	-	1	-	-	-	1	-	2	1993
	(Spain) Juan Aguilera	-	-	-	1	-	-	-	-	-	1	1990
	(Argentina) Guillermo Cañas	-	-	-	-	-	1	-	-	-	1	2002
	(Spain) Albert Costa	-	-	-	1	-	-	-	-	-	1	1998
	(Spain) Roberto Carretero	-	-	-	1	-	-	-	-	-	1	1996
	(Switzerland) Roger Federer	-	-	-	1	-	-	-	-	-	1	2002
	(France) Sébastien Grosjean	-	-	-	-	-	-	-	-	1	1	2001
	(Germany) Tommy Haas	-	-	-	-	-	-	-	1	-	1	2001
	(Australia) Lleyton Hewitt	1	-	-	-	-	-	-	-	-	1	2002
	(Sweden) Thomas Johansson	-	-	-	-	-	1	-	-	-	1	1999
	(Czech Republic) Petr Korda	-	-	-	-	-	-	-	1	-	1	1997
	(Sweden) Magnus Norman	-	-	-	-	1	-	-	-	-	1	2000
	(Czech Republic) Karel Nováček	-	-	-	1	-	-	-	-	-	1	1991
	(Romania) Andrei Pavel	-	-	-	-	-	1	-	-	-	1	2001
	(Sweden) Mikael Pernfors	-	-	-	-	-	1	-	-	-	1	1993
	(Australia) Mark Philippoussis	1	-	-	-	-	-	-	-	-	1	1999
	(France) Cédric Pioline	-	-	1	-	-	-	-	-	-	1	2000
	(Spain) Albert Portas	-	-	-	-	1	-	-	-	-	1	2001
	(United Kingdom) Greg Rusedski	-	-	-	-	-	-	-	-	1	1	1998
	(Spain) Emilio Sánchez	-	-	-	-	1	-	-	-	-	1	1991
	(United States) Chris Woodruff	-	-	-	-	-	1	-	-	-	1	1997
#	Player	IN	MI	MO	HA	RO	CA	CI	ST	PA	#	Winning span

== See also ==
- ATP Tour Masters 1000
- 2002 ATP Tour
- 2002 WTA Tier I Series
- 2002 WTA Tour
