= 2002 WTA Tier I Series =

Women's professional tennis tour

Details
- Duration: January 28 – October 20
- Edition: 13th
- Tournaments: 9

Achievements (singles)
- Most titles: (United States) Serena Williams (2)
- Most finals: (United States) Serena Williams (3)

The WTA Tier I events are part of the elite tour for professional women's tennis organised by the WTA called the WTA Tour.

== Tournaments ==
Tournament	Country	Location	Surface	Date	Prize money
Pan Pacific Open	Japan	Tokyo	Carpet (i)	Jan 28 – Feb 3	$1,224,000
Pacific Life Open	United States	Indian Wells	Hard	Mar 4 – 17	$2,100,000
NASDAQ-100 Open	United States	Key Biscayne	Hard	Mar 18 – 31	$2,860,000
Family Circle Cup	United States	Charleston	Clay (green)	Apr 15 – 21	$1,224,000
Eurocard German Open	Germany	Berlin	Clay	May 6 – 12	$1,224,000
Italian Open	Italy	Rome	Clay	May 13 – 19	$1,224,000
Rogers AT&T Cup	Canada	Montreal	Hard	Aug 12 – 18	$1,224,000
Kremlin Cup	Russia	Moscow	Carpet (i)	Sep 30 – Oct 6	$1,224,000
Swisscom Challenge	Switzerland	Zürich	Hard (i)	Oct 14 – 20	$1,224,000

== Results ==
* First-time champion

Tournament	Singles champions	Runners-up	Score	Doubles champions	Runners-up	Score
Tokyo Singles – Doubles	(Switzerland) Martina Hingis	(United States) Monica Seles	7–6^{(8–6)}, 4–6, 6–3	(United States) Lisa Raymond (Australia) Rennae Stubbs	(Belgium) Els Callens (Italy) Roberta Vinci	6–1, 6–1
Indian Wells Singles – Doubles	(Slovakia) Daniela Hantuchová*	(Switzerland) Martina Hingis	6–3, 6–4	(United States) Lisa Raymond (Australia) Rennae Stubbs	(Russia) Elena Dementieva (Slovakia) Janette Husárová	7–5, 6–0
Miami Singles – Doubles	(United States) Serena Williams	(United States) Jennifer Capriati	7–5, 7–6	(United States) Lisa Raymond (Australia) Rennae Stubbs	(Spain) Virginia Ruano Pascual (Argentina) Paola Suárez	7–6^{(7–4)}, 6–7^{(4–7)}, 6–3
Charleston Singles – Doubles	(Croatia) Iva Majoli	(Switzerland) Patty Schnyder	6–3, 6–4	(United States) Lisa Raymond (Australia) Rennae Stubbs	(France) Alexandra Fusai (Netherlands) Caroline Vis	6–4, 3–6, 7–6^{(7–4)}
Berlin Singles – Doubles	(Belgium) Justine Henin*	(United States) Serena Williams	6–2, 1–6, 7–6^{(7–5)}	(Russia) Elena Dementieva* (Slovakia) Janette Husárová*	(Slovakia) Daniela Hantuchová (Spain) Arantxa Sánchez Vicario	0–6, 7–6^{(7–3)}, 6–2
Rome Singles – Doubles	(United States) Serena Williams	(Belgium) Justine Henin	7–6, 6–4	(Spain) Virginia Ruano Pascual (Argentina) Paola Suárez	(Spain) Conchita Martínez (Argentina) Patricia Tarabini	6–3, 6–4
Montréal Singles – Doubles	(France) Amélie Mauresmo	(United States) Jennifer Capriati	6–4, 6–1	(Spain) Virginia Ruano Pascual (Argentina) Paola Suárez	(Japan) Rika Fujiwara (Japan) Ai Sugiyama	6–4, 7–6^{(7–4)}
Moscow Singles – Doubles	(Bulgaria) Magdalena Maleeva	(United States) Lindsay Davenport	5–7, 6–3, 7–6^{(7–4)}	(Russia) Elena Dementieva (Slovakia) Janette Husárová	(Federal Republic of Yugoslavia) Jelena Dokić (Russia) Nadia Petrova	2–6, 6–3, 7–6^{(9–7)}
Zürich Singles – Doubles	(Switzerland) Patty Schnyder*	(United States) Lindsay Davenport	6–7^{(5–7)}, 7–6^{(10–8)}, 6–3	(Russia) Elena Bovina* (Belgium) Justine Henin*	(Federal Republic of Yugoslavia) Jelena Dokić (Russia) Nadia Petrova	6–2, 7–6^{(7–2)}

== See also ==
- WTA Tier I events
- 2002 WTA Tour
- 2002 Tennis Masters Series
- 2002 ATP Tour
