= 2003 DFS Classic – Singles =

Singles
- 2003 DFS Classic

Final
- Champion: (Bulgaria) Magdalena Maleeva
- Runner-up: (Japan) Shinobu Asagoe
- Score: 6–1, 6–4

Details
- Draw: 56 (8 Q / 2 WC )
- Seeds: 16

Events
Singles	Doubles
← 2002 ·	Birmingham Classic	· 2004 →

Jelena Dokić was the defending champion, but chose not to participate this year.

Magdalena Maleeva won the title, defeating Shinobu Asagoe in the final 6–1, 6–4.

== Seeds ==
A champion seed is indicated in bold text while text in italics indicates the round in which that seed was eliminated. The top eight seeds received a bye to the second round.

1. (Russia) Elena Dementieva (quarterfinals)
2. (Greece) Eleni Daniilidou (semifinals)
3. (Bulgaria) **Magdalena Maleeva (champion)**
4. (Russia) Elena Bovina (second round)
5. (France) Nathalie Dechy (second round)
6. (United States) Lisa Raymond (third round)
7. (United States) Alexandra Stevenson (second round)
8. (Russia) Elena Likhovtseva (second round)
9. (United States) Laura Granville (second round)
10. (Thailand) Tamarine Tanasugarn (quarterfinals)
11. (Switzerland) Marie-Gayanay Mikaelian (third round)
12. (Czech Republic) Dája Bedáňová (first round)
13. (France) Émilie Loit (first round)
14. (South Korea) Cho Yoon-jeong (third round)
15. (Australia) Nicole Pratt (first round)
16. (Slovenia) Tina Pisnik (third round)

== Draw ==
=== Key ===
- Q = Qualifier
- WC = Wild card
- LL = Lucky loser
- Alt = Alternate
- SE = Special exempt
- PR = Protected ranking
- ITF = ITF entry
- JE = Junior exempt
- w/o = Walkover
- r = Retired
- d = Defaulted
- SR = Special ranking

=== Finals ===
Semifinals
Q	(Russia) Maria Sharapova	2	**6**	6^{3}
(Japan) **Shinobu Asagoe**	**6**	2	**7^{7}**
3	(Bulgaria) **Magdalena Maleeva**	**6**	5	**6**
2	(Greece) Eleni Daniilidou	3	**7**	4

Final
(Japan) Shinobu Asagoe	1	4
3	(Bulgaria) **Magdalena Maleeva**	**6**	**6**

=== Top half ===
==== Section 1 ====
First round
(United States) C Morariu	2	6^{5}
Q	(United States) **T Snyder**	**6**	**7^{7}**
(Australia) **E Dominikovic**	6^{2}	**6**	**7^{7}**
(France) S Cohen-Aloro	**7^{7}**	1	6^{3}
(France) **M Bartoli**	**6**	**6**
13	(France) É Loit	1	3
11	(Switzerland) **M-G Mikaelian**	**6**	**7**
Q	(United States) L Osterloh	4	5
(Czech Republic) **Z Ondrášková**	**6**	3	**7**
(Japan) A Morigami	2	**6**	5
(Russia) E Kulikovskaya	1	1
Q	(Russia) **M Sharapova**	**6**	**6**

Second round
1	(Russia) **E Dementieva**	**7**	**6**
Q	(United States) T Snyder	5	1
(Australia) E Dominikovic
(France) **M Bartoli**	w/o
11	(Switzerland) **M-G Mikaelian**	**6**	**6**
(Czech Republic) Z Ondrášková	1	2
Q	(Russia) **M Sharapova**	**6**	**6**
5	(France) N Dechy	3	2

Third round
1	(Russia) **E Dementieva**	4	**6**	**6**
(France) M Bartoli	**6**	3	4
11	(Switzerland) M-G Mikaelian	0	5
Q	(Russia) **M Sharapova**	**6**	**7**

Quarterfinals
1	(Russia) E Dementieva	**6**	6^{4}	2
Q	(Russia) **M Sharapova**	2	**7^{7}**	**6**

==== Section 2 ====
First round
(Japan) **S Asagoe**	**6**	**7**
(United States) S Reeves	1	5
(Indonesia) **A Widjaja**	**6**	6^{5}	**7**
LL	(Indonesia) W Prakusya	3	**7^{7}**	5
(Belgium) **E Callens**	**6**	**6**
15	(Australia) N Pratt	3	2
12	(Czech Republic) D Bedáňová	2	**6**	6^{2}
Q	(Venezuela) **M Vento-Kabchi**	**6**	4	**7^{7}**
Q	(Chinese Taipei) **J Lee**	**7**	**6**
(Germany) M Weingärtner	5	2
(United States) L Lee-Waters	**6**	2	3
(France) **V Razzano**	2	**6**	**6**

Second round
4	(Russia) E Bovina	3	3
(Japan) **S Asagoe**	**6**	**6**
(Indonesia) A Widjaja	1	**6**	2
(Belgium) **E Callens**	**6**	3	**6**
Q	(Venezuela) **M Vento-Kabchi**	2	**7**	**6**
Q	(Chinese Taipei) J Lee	**6**	5	2
(France) **V Razzano**	3	**7**	**6**
7	(United States) A Stevenson	**6**	5	3

Third round
(Japan) **S Asagoe**	**7^{9}**	**6**
(Belgium) E Callens	6^{7}	1
Q	(Venezuela) **M Vento-Kabchi**	**6**	**6**
(France) V Razzano	3	3

Quarterfinals
(Japan) **S Asagoe**	4	**6**	**7^{7}**
Q	(Venezuela) M Vento-Kabchi	**6**	2	6^{3}

=== Bottom half ===
==== Section 3 ====
First round
(France) **S Foretz**	**6**	**6**
LL	(Argentina) G Dulko	3	2
(Ukraine) **T Perebiynis**	**7**	**6**
(Zimbabwe) C Black	5	1
(United States) A Cargill	2	2
9	(United States) **L Granville**	**6**	**6**
14	(South Korea) **Y-J Cho**	**6**	2	**6**
(Switzerland) E Gagliardi	4	**6**	4
LL	(Canada) V Webb	4	**6**	2
(United States) **J Craybas**	**6**	3	**6**
WC	(United Kingdom) **J O'Donoghue**	6^{4}	**7**	1
WC	(United Kingdom) E Baltacha	**7^{7}**	5	0^{r}

Second round
8	(Russia) E Likhovtseva	3	4
(France) **S Foretz**	**6**	**6**
(Ukraine) **T Perebiynis**	**6**	2	**6**
9	(United States) L Granville	0	**6**	4
14	(South Korea) **Y-J Cho**	**7**	**7**
(United States) J Craybas	5	5
WC	(United Kingdom) J O'Donoghue	2	4
3	(Bulgaria) **M Maleeva**	**6**	**6**

Third round
(France) **S Foretz**	**6**	**7^{7}**
(Ukraine) T Perebiynis	3	6^{4}
14	(South Korea) Y-J Cho	1	**7**	1
3	(Bulgaria) **M Maleeva**	**6**	5	**6**

Quarterfinals
(France) S Foretz	**7^{7}**	2	3
3	(Bulgaria) **M Maleeva**	6^{5}	**6**	**6**

==== Section 4 ====
First round
(Russia) **A Rodionova**	**6**	**6**
(Croatia) S Talaja	3	1
(Australia) A Molik	2	**6**	3
Q	(Italy) **R Vinci**	**6**	3	**6**
(Italy) An Serra Zanetti	4	2
10	(Thailand) **T Tanasugarn**	**6**	**6**
16	(Slovenia) **T Pisnik**	**6**	5	**6**
(Japan) S Obata	1	**7**	2
LL	(Italy) **Ad Serra Zanetti**	**6**	**6**
(Madagascar) D Randriantefy	4	3
Q	(United States) **M Tu**	**6**	**6**
Q	(Japan) Y Yoshida	4	2

Second round
6	(United States) **L Raymond**	**6**	**6**
(Russia) A Rodionova	3	3
Q	(Italy) R Vinci	4	2
10	(Thailand) **T Tanasugarn**	**6**	**6**
16	(Slovenia) **T Pisnik**	**6**	**6**
LL	(Italy) Ad Serra Zanetti	2	4
Q	(United States) M Tu	5	1
2	(Greece) **E Daniilidou**	**7**	**6**

Third round
6	(United States) L Raymond	2	2
10	(Thailand) **T Tanasugarn**	**6**	**6**
16	(Slovenia) T Pisnik	4	**6**	2
2	(Greece) **E Daniilidou**	**6**	1	**6**

Quarterfinals
10	(Thailand) T Tanasugarn	**6**	6^{5}	6^{4}
2	(Greece) **E Daniilidou**	3	**7^{7}**	**7^{7}**
