= 2004 DFS Classic – Doubles =

Doubles
- 2004 DFS Classic

Final
- Champions: (Russia) Maria Kirilenko (Russia) Maria Sharapova
- Runners-up: (Australia) Lisa McShea (Venezuela) Milagros Sequera
- Score: 6–2, 6–1

Events
Singles	Doubles
← 2003 ·	Birmingham Classic	· 2005 →

Els Callens and Meilen Tu were the defending champions but they competed with different partners that year. Callens partnered with Shinobu Asagoe, and lost in the first round to Eleni Daniilidou and Katarina Srebotnik. Tu partnered with Tina Križan, and lost in the quarterfinals to Maria Kirilenko and Maria Sharapova.

Kirilenko and Sharapova won the title, defeating Lisa McShea and Milagros Sequera in the final 6–2, 6–1. Despite playing on the WTA tour for a further 16 years, this was Sharapova's last WTA final, and title, in doubles.

== Seeds ==
Champion seeds are indicated in bold text while text in italics indicates the round in which those seeds were eliminated.

1. (Venezuela) María Vento-Kabchi / (Indonesia) Angelique Widjaja (first round)
2. (China) Li Ting / (China) Sun Tiantian (first round)
3. (Australia) Alicia Molik / (Spain) Magüi Serna (quarterfinals)
4. (South Africa) Liezel Huber / (Ukraine) Tatiana Perebiynis (first round)

== Draw ==
=== Key ===
- Q = Qualifier
- WC = Wild card
- LL = Lucky loser
- Alt = Alternate
- SE = Special exempt
- PR = Protected ranking
- ITF = ITF entry
- JE = Junior exempt
- w/o = Walkover
- r = Retired
- d = Defaulted
- SR = Special ranking

=== Main draw ===
First round
1	(Venezuela) M Vento-Kabchi (Indonesia) A Widjaja	2	**6**	5
(Russia) **T Panova** (Ukraine) **E Tatarkova**	**6**	0	**7**
(China) **Z Yan** (China) **J Zheng**	**7^{7}**	**6**
(France) N Dechy (Slovakia) D Hantuchová	6^{5}	4
3	(Australia) **A Molik** (Spain) **M Serna**	6^{2}	**7^{7}**	**6**
WC	(United Kingdom) E Baltacha (United Kingdom) A Janes	**7^{7}**	6^{3}	1
Q	(Bosnia and Herzegovina) M Jugić-Salkić (United States) A Spears	1	3
(Australia) **L McShea** (Venezuela) **M Sequera**	**6**	**6**
(Greece) **E Daniilidou** (Slovenia) **K Srebotnik**	**7**	4	**6**
(Japan) S Asagoe (Belgium) E Callens	5	**6**	4
(Switzerland) **E Gagliardi** (Italy) **R Vinci**	**6**	3	**6**
4	(South Africa) L Huber (Ukraine) T Perebiynis	4	**6**	1
(Slovenia) **T Križan** (United States) **M Tu**	**6**	**6**
(Italy) R Grande (Switzerland) P Schnyder	2	0
WC	(Russia) **M Kirilenko** (Russia) **M Sharapova**	**6**	**6**
2	(China) T Li (China) T Sun	4	0

Quarterfinals
(Russia) T Panova (Ukraine) E Tatarkova	4	**6**	4
(China) **Z Yan** (China) **J Zheng**	**6**	3	**6**
3	(Australia) A Molik (Spain) M Serna
(Australia) **L McShea** (Venezuela) **M Sequera**	**w/o**
(Greece) E Daniilidou (Slovenia) K Srebotnik
(Switzerland) **E Gagliardi** (Italy) **R Vinci**	**w/o**
(Slovenia) T Križan (United States) M Tu	2	6^{5}
WC	(Russia) **M Kirilenko** (Russia) **M Sharapova**	**6**	**7^{7}**

Semifinals
(China) Z Yan (China) J Zheng	6^{4}	0
(Australia) **L McShea** (Venezuela) **M Sequera**	**7^{7}**	**6**
(Switzerland) E Gagliardi (Italy) R Vinci	4	**6**	2
WC	(Russia) **M Kirilenko** (Russia) **M Sharapova**	**6**	4	**6**

Final
(Australia) Lisa McShea (Venezuela) Milagros Sequera	2	1
WC	(Russia) **Maria Kirilenko** (Russia) **Maria Sharapova**	**6**	**6**

=== Qualifying draw ===
First qualifying round			Final qualifying round
1	**(Bosnia and Herzegovina) M Jugić-Salkić** **(United States) A Spears**	**8**
WC	(United Kingdom) H Crook (United Kingdom) A Keothavong	3	1	**(Bosnia and Herzegovina) M Jugić-Salkić** **(United States) A Spears**	**6**	**6**
	**(Italy) Ad Serra Zanetti** **(Italy) An Serra Zanetti**	**8**		(Italy) Ad Serra Zanetti (Italy) An Serra Zanetti	3	3
2	(Ukraine) Y Beygelzimer (Russia) A Jidkova	5
