= 2002 DFS Classic – Doubles =

Doubles
- 2002 DFS Classic

Final
- Champions: (Japan) Shinobu Asagoe (Belgium) Els Callens
- Runners-up: (United States) Kimberly Po-Messerli (France) Nathalie Tauziat
- Score: 6–4, 6–3

Events
Singles	Doubles
← 2001 ·	Birmingham Classic	· 2003 →

Cara Black and Elena Likhovtseva were the defending champions and top seeds but withdrew before the start of the tournament.

Shinobu Asagoe and Els Callens won in the final 6–4, 6–3 against Kimberly Po-Messerli and Nathalie Tauziat.

== Seeds ==
Champion seeds are indicated in bold text while text in italics indicates the round in which those seeds were eliminated.

1. (Zimbabwe) Cara Black / (Russia) Elena Likhovtseva (withdrew)
2. (United States) Kimberly Po-Messerli / (France) Nathalie Tauziat (final)
3. (United States) Nicole Arendt / (South Africa) Liezel Huber (semifinals)
4. (Chinese Taipei) Janet Lee / (Indonesia) Wynne Prakusya (first round)

== Draw ==
=== Key ===
- Q = Qualifier
- WC = Wild card
- LL = Lucky loser
- Alt = Alternate
- SE = Special exempt
- PR = Protected ranking
- ITF = ITF entry
- JE = Junior exempt
- w/o = Walkover
- r = Retired
- d = Defaulted
- SR = Special ranking

=== Main draw ===
First round
LL	(Italy) **Ad Serra Zanetti** (Italy) **An Serra Zanetti**	**7**	**6**
(South Africa) K Grant (United States) A Spears	5	2
(Australia) **R McQuillan** (Australia) **L McShea**	**6**	**6**
(South Africa) N de Villiers (Kazakhstan) I Selyutina	1	1
4	(Chinese Taipei) J Lee (Indonesia) W Prakusya	6^{6}	1
(Greece) **E Daniilidou** (Australia) **N Pratt**	**7^{8}**	**6**
(Australia) A Molik (Spain) M Serna	1	**6**	2
(Japan) **S Asagoe** (Belgium) **E Callens**	**6**	4	**6**
(United States) K Schlukebir (Ukraine) E Tatarkova	2	2
WC	(United Kingdom) **J Pullin** (United Kingdom) **L Woodroffe**	**6**	**6**
(Czech Republic) D Bedáňová (Russia) E Bovina	2	5
3	(United States) **N Arendt** (South Africa) **L Huber**	**6**	**7**
(Japan) **R Fujiwara** (Japan) **A Sugiyama**	**6**	**6**
(Italy) R Grande (United States) M Tu	3	4
Q	(Russia) T Panova (Australia) C Wheeler	3	3
2	(United States) **K Po-Messerli** (France) **N Tauziat**	**6**	**6**

Quarterfinals
LL	(Italy) Ad Serra Zanetti (Italy) An Serra Zanetti	4	2
(Australia) **R McQuillan** (Australia) **L McShea**	**6**	**6**
(Greece) E Daniilidou (Australia) N Pratt	4	**6**	2
(Japan) **S Asagoe** (Belgium) **E Callens**	**6**	1	**6**
WC	(United Kingdom) J Pullin (United Kingdom) L Woodroffe	3	6^{10}
3	(United States) **N Arendt** (South Africa) **L Huber**	**6**	**7^{12}**
(Japan) R Fujiwara (Japan) A Sugiyama	5	4
2	(United States) **K Po-Messerli** (France) **N Tauziat**	**7**	**6**

Semifinals
(Australia) R McQuillan (Australia) L McShea	**6**	4	3
(Japan) **S Asagoe** (Belgium) **E Callens**	3	**6**	**6**
3	(United States) N Arendt (South Africa) L Huber	2	r
2	(United States) **K Po-Messerli** (France) **N Tauziat**	**6**

Final
(Japan) **Shinobu Asagoe** (Belgium) **Els Callens**	**6**	**6**
2	(United States) Kimberly Po-Messerli (France) Nathalie Tauziat	4	3

=== Qualifying draw ===
First qualifying round			Final qualifying round
1	**(Italy) Ad Serra Zanetti** **(Italy) An Serra Zanetti**	**9^{7}**
WC	(United Kingdom) L Ahl (United Kingdom) E Baltacha	8^{5}	1	(Italy) Ad Serra Zanetti (Italy) An Serra Zanetti	2	1
	**(Russia) T Panova** **(Australia) C Wheeler**	**9**		**(Russia) T Panova** **(Australia) C Wheeler**	**6**	**6**
2	(Thailand) T Tanasugarn (Indonesia) A Widjaja	7
