= 2002 DFS Classic – Singles =

Singles
- 2002 DFS Classic

Final
- Champion: (Federal Republic of Yugoslavia) Jelena Dokić
- Runner-up: (Russia) Anastasia Myskina
- Score: 6–2, 6–3

Details
- Draw: 56 (8 Q / 3 WC )
- Seeds: 16

Events
Singles	Doubles
← 2001 ·	Birmingham Classic	· 2003 →

Nathalie Tauziat was the defending champion, but chose not to participate this year.

Jelena Dokić won the title, defeating Anastasia Myskina in the final 6–2, 6–3.

== Seeds ==
A champion seed is indicated in bold text while text in italics indicates the round in which that seed was eliminated. The top eight seeds received a bye to the second round.

1. (Federal Republic of Yugoslavia) **Jelena Dokić (champion)**
2. (France) Sandrine Testud (third round)
3. (Bulgaria) Magdalena Maleeva (quarterfinals)
4. (Thailand) Tamarine Tanasugarn (second round)
5. (Russia) Tatiana Panova (second round)
6. (Russia) Anastasia Myskina (final)
7. (Luxembourg) Anne Kremer (quarterfinals)
8. (United States) Lisa Raymond (semifinals)
9. (Czech Republic) Dája Bedáňová (third round)
10. (United States) Alexandra Stevenson (third round)
11. (Japan) Ai Sugiyama (third round)
12. (Italy) Rita Grande (second round)
13. (Spain) Magüi Serna (second round)
14. (Australia) Nicole Pratt (semifinals)
15. (Italy) Adriana Serra Zanetti (first round)
16. (Russia) Elena Likhovtseva (third round)

== Draw ==
=== Key ===
- Q = Qualifier
- WC = Wild card
- LL = Lucky loser
- Alt = Alternate
- SE = Special exempt
- PR = Protected ranking
- ITF = ITF entry
- JE = Junior exempt
- w/o = Walkover
- r = Retired
- d = Defaulted
- SR = Special ranking

=== Finals ===
Semifinals
1	(Federal Republic of Yugoslavia) **Jelena Dokić**	**6**	**7**
8	(United States) Lisa Raymond	1	5
6	(Russia) **Anastasia Myskina**	**6**	**7**
14	(Australia) Nicole Pratt	3	5

Final
1	(Federal Republic of Yugoslavia) **Jelena Dokić**	**6**	**6**
6	(Russia) Anastasia Myskina	2	3

=== Top half ===
==== Section 1 ====
First round
WC	(United Kingdom) **L Ahl**	4	**6**	**6**
Q	(Australia) A Grahame	**6**	4	1
(Zimbabwe) **C Black**	**6**	**6**
(United States) J Hopkins	1	3
Q	(Belgium) E Callens	4	2
16	(Russia) **E Likhovtseva**	**6**	**6**
11	(Japan) **A Sugiyama**	**6**	**6**
Q	(Bulgaria) S Krivencheva	2	1
(Canada) J Nejedly	5	4
(Germany) **G Arn**	**7**	**6**
(Greece) **E Daniilidou**	**6**	**6**
(United States) M Washington	4	2

Second round
1	(Federal Republic of Yugoslavia) **J Dokić**	**7^{7}**	**6**
WC	(United Kingdom) L Ahl	6^{4}	4
(Zimbabwe) C Black	2	4
16	(Russia) **E Likhovtseva**	**6**	**6**
11	(Japan) **A Sugiyama**	**6**	**6**
(Germany) G Arn	4	2
(Greece) **E Daniilidou**	**6**	**6**
5	(Russia) T Panova	4	2

Third round
1	(Federal Republic of Yugoslavia) **J Dokić**	**6**	**6**
16	(Russia) E Likhovtseva	3	2
11	(Japan) A Sugiyama	4	2
(Greece) **E Daniilidou**	**6**	**6**

Quarterfinals
1	(Federal Republic of Yugoslavia) **J Dokić**	**6**	4	**6**
(Greece) E Daniilidou	4	**6**	4

==== Section 2 ====
First round
(Puerto Rico) K Brandi	4	5
(United States) **J Craybas**	**6**	**7**
Q	(South Korea) **M-R Jeon**	2	**6**	**6**
(United States) S Taylor	**6**	3	3
(Argentina) **C Fernández**	**6**	1	**6**
15	(Italy) A Serra Zanetti	3	**6**	4
12	(Italy) **R Grande**	**6**	**6**
(Kazakhstan) I Selyutina	2	4
(Russia) **E Bovina**	**6**	**7^{7}**
Q	(Japan) M Saeki	4	6^{2}
Q	(Ukraine) **E Tatarkova**	**7^{7}**	**7^{8}**
(Australia) A Molik	6^{2}	6^{6}

Second round
4	(Thailand) T Tanasugarn	**6**	4	2
(United States) **J Craybas**	2	**6**	**6**
Q	(South Korea) M-R Jeon	4	4
(Argentina) **C Fernández**	**6**	**6**
12	(Italy) R Grande	**6**	4	0
(Russia) **E Bovina**	4	**6**	**6**
Q	(Ukraine) E Tatarkova	3	1
8	(United States) **L Raymond**	**6**	**6**

Third round
(United States) J Craybas	5	3
(Argentina) **C Fernández**	**7**	**6**
(Russia) E Bovina	5	4
8	(United States) **L Raymond**	**7**	**6**

Quarterfinals
(Argentina) C Fernández	2^{r}
8	(United States) **L Raymond**	4

=== Bottom half ===
==== Section 3 ====
First round
(Tunisia) S Sfar	3	2
(France) **S Foretz**	**6**	**6**
Q	(Japan) **S Asagoe**	**6**	**6**
Q	(Russia) E Kulikovskaya	2	0
(Indonesia) W Prakusya	2	6^{3}
10	(United States) **A Stevenson**	**6**	**7^{7}**
13	(Spain) **M Serna**	**6**	**6**
WC	(United Kingdom) E Baltacha	1	3
WC	(United Kingdom) **J Pullin**	**6**	**6**
(Indonesia) A Widjaja	3	2
(United States) **M Tu**	**7**	**6**
(Chinese Taipei) J Lee	5	1

Second round
6	(Russia) **A Myskina**	**6**	**7**
(France) S Foretz	2	5
Q	(Japan) S Asagoe	3	4
10	(United States) **A Stevenson**	**6**	**6**
13	(Spain) M Serna	4	2
WC	(United Kingdom) **J Pullin**	**6**	**6**
(United States) M Tu	2	5
3	(Bulgaria) **M Maleeva**	**6**	**7**

Third round
6	(Russia) **A Myskina**	3	**6**	**6**
10	(United States) A Stevenson	**6**	2	3
WC	(United Kingdom) J Pullin	6^{5}	0
3	(Bulgaria) **M Maleeva**	**7^{7}**	**6**

Quarterfinals
6	(Russia) **A Myskina**	2	**6**	**7^{7}**
3	(Bulgaria) M Maleeva	**6**	3	6^{2}

==== Section 4 ====
First round
(United States) M Irvin	2	2
(Netherlands) **M Oremans**	**6**	**6**
(Canada) M Drake	**6**	6^{1}	1
(South Korea) **Y-J Cho**	2	**7^{7}**	**6**
(Japan) S Obata	4	6^{4}
9	(Czech Republic) **D Bedáňová**	**6**	**7^{7}**
14	(Australia) **N Pratt**	**6**	3	**6**
(Slovenia) T Pisnik	1	**6**	0
(United States) **L Osterloh**	**6**	5	**7^{8}**
(Russia) A Jidkova	2	**7**	6^{6}
(Germany) **J Kandarr**	**6**	**6**
(Germany) M Weingärtner	2	2

Second round
7	(Luxembourg) **A Kremer**	**6**	**7**
(Netherlands) M Oremans	4	5
(South Korea) Y-J Cho	5	1
9	(Czech Republic) **D Bedáňová**	**7**	**6**
14	(Australia) **N Pratt**	**6**	**6**
(United States) L Osterloh	4	2
(Germany) J Kandarr	1	3
2	(France) **S Testud**	**6**	**6**

Third round
7	(Luxembourg) **A Kremer**	**6**	5	**6**
9	(Czech Republic) D Bedáňová	0	**7**	4
14	(Australia) **N Pratt**	**6**	**6**
2	(France) S Testud	4	1

Quarterfinals
7	(Luxembourg) A Kremer	**6**	2	3
14	(Australia) **N Pratt**	3	**6**	**6**
