= 2004 DFS Classic =

- Date: 7–13 June
- Edition: 23rd
- Category: Tier III
- Draw: 56S / 16D
- Surface: Grass / outdoor
- Location: Birmingham, United Kingdom
- Venue: Edgbaston Priory Club

Champions

Singles
- (Russia) Maria Sharapova

Doubles
- (Russia) Maria Kirilenko / (Russia) Maria Sharapova
← 2003 ·	Birmingham Classic	· 2005 →

The 2004 DFS Classic was a women's tennis tournament played on grass courts at the Edgbaston Priory Club in Birmingham in the United Kingdom that was part of Tier III of the 2004 WTA Tour. The tournament was held from 7 June until 13 June 2004. Third-seeded Maria Sharapova won the singles title.

== Finals ==
=== Singles ===
(Russia) Maria Sharapova defeated (France) Tatiana Golovin 4–6, 6–2, 6–1

- It was Sharapova's 1st title of the year and the 5th of her career.

=== Doubles ===
(Russia) Maria Kirilenko / (Russia) Maria Sharapova defeated (Australia) Lisa McShea / (Venezuela) Milagros Sequera 6–2, 6–1

- It was Kirilenko's only title of the year and the 1st of her career. It was Sharapova's 2nd title of the year and the 6th of her career.
