= 2002 Canada Masters and the Rogers AT&T Cup =

2002 Canada Masters
- Date: July 29 – August 4 (men); August 10–18 (women)
- Edition: 113th
- Surface: Hard / outdoor

Champions

Men's singles
- (Argentina) Guillermo Cañas

Women's singles
- (France) Amélie Mauresmo

Men's doubles
- (United States) Bob Bryan / (United States) Mike Bryan

Women's doubles
- (Spain) Virginia Ruano Pascual / (Argentina) Paola Suárez
- Canadian Open

The 2002 Canada Masters and the Rogers AT&T Cup were tennis tournaments played on outdoor hard courts. It was the 113th edition of the Canada Masters and was part of the Tennis Masters Series of the 2002 ATP Tour and of Tier I of the 2002 WTA Tour. The men's event took place at the National Tennis Centre in Toronto in Canada from July 29 through August 4, 2002 and the women's event at the du Maurier Stadium in Montreal in Canada from August 10 through August 18, 2002.

The men's draw featured World No. 1 and Wimbledon champion Lleyton Hewitt, ATP No. 2 and Australian Open runner-up Marat Safin, and ATP No. 3 and Rome finalist Tommy Haas. Other top players present were Indian Wells finalist Tim Henman, French Open doubles champion Yevgeny Kafelnikov, Albert Costa, Andre Agassi and Juan Carlos Ferrero.

The women's draw was led by new World No. 1, French Open and Wimbledon winner and defending champion Serena Williams, WTA No. 3 and Australian Open champion Jennifer Capriati, Sarasota and Birmingham titlist and Manhattan Beach doubles champion Jelena Dokić. Other top seeds were Hamburg winner Kim Clijsters, Berlin champion Justine Henin, Martina Hingis, Amélie Mauresmo and Daniela Hantuchová.

== Finals ==
=== Men's singles ===
(Argentina) Guillermo Cañas defeated (United States) Andy Roddick 6–4, 7–5

- It was Cañas' 2nd title of the year and the 5th of his career. It was his 1st career Masters title.

=== Women's singles ===
(France) Amélie Mauresmo defeated (United States) Jennifer Capriati 6–4, 6–1

- It was Mauresmo's 2nd title of the year and the 9th of her career. It was her 1st Tier I title of the year and her 2nd overall.

=== Men's doubles ===
(United States) Bob Bryan / (United States) Mike Bryan defeated (The Bahamas) Mark Knowles / (Canada) Daniel Nestor 4–6, 7–6^{(7–1)}, 6–3

- It was Bob Bryan's 4th title of the year and the 8th of his career. It was Mike Bryan's 5th title of the year and the 9th of his career.

=== Women's doubles ===
(Spain) Virginia Ruano Pascual / (Argentina) Paola Suárez defeated (Japan) Rika Fujiwara / (Japan) Ai Sugiyama 6–4, 7–6^{(7–4)}

- It was Ruano Pascual's 5th title of the year and the 18th of her career. It was Suárez's 5th title of the year and the 25th of her career.
