= 2004 DFS Classic – Singles =

Singles
- 2004 DFS Classic

Final
- Champion: (Russia) Maria Sharapova
- Runner-up: (France) Tatiana Golovin
- Score: 4–6, 6–2, 6–1

Details
- Draw: 56 (8 Q / 3 WC )
- Seeds: 16

Events
Singles	Doubles
← 2003 ·	Birmingham Classic	· 2005 →

Magdalena Maleeva was the defending champion, but lost in the third round to Tamarine Tanasugarn.

Maria Sharapova won the title, defeating Tatiana Golovin in the final 4–6, 6–2, 6–1.

== Seeds ==
The champion seed is indicated in bold text. Text in italics indicates the round in which that seed was eliminated. The top eight seeds received a bye to the second round.

1. (Russia) Nadia Petrova (second round)
2. (Switzerland) Patty Schnyder (semifinals)
3. (Russia) **Maria Sharapova (champion)**
4. (Bulgaria) Magdalena Maleeva (third round)
5. (Serbia and Montenegro) Jelena Dokić (second round)
6. (France) Nathalie Dechy (second round)
7. (Greece) Eleni Daniilidou (second round)
8. (Australia) Alicia Molik (quarterfinals)
9. (France) Émilie Loit (semifinals)
10. (Venezuela) María Vento-Kabchi (first round)
11. (Slovenia) Tina Pisnik (first round)
12. (Spain) Magüi Serna (first round)
13. (Luxembourg) Claudine Schaul (first round)
14. (Russia) Lina Krasnoroutskaya (first round)
15. (Russia) Elena Likhovtseva (first round)
16. (Spain) María Sánchez Lorenzo (third round)

== Draw ==
=== Key ===
- Q = Qualifier
- WC = Wild card
- LL = Lucky loser
- Alt = Alternate
- SE = Special exempt
- PR = Protected ranking
- ITF = ITF entry
- JE = Junior exempt
- w/o = Walkover
- r = Retired
- d = Defaulted
- SR = Special ranking

=== Finals ===
Semifinals
(France) **Tatiana Golovin**	**6**	5	**7**
9	(France) Émilie Loit	3	**7**	5
3	(Russia) **Maria Sharapova**	**6**	6^{3}	**6**
2	(Switzerland) Patty Schnyder	1	**7^{7}**	3

Final
(France) Tatiana Golovin	**6**	2	1
3	(Russia) **Maria Sharapova**	4	**6**	**6**

=== Top half ===
==== Section 1 ====
First round
(Japan) **S Asagoe**	**6**	**6**
(Ukraine) J Vakulenko	2	4
(Slovakia) **D Hantuchová**	**6**	**6**
(South Korea) Y-J Cho	3	1
(France) **T Golovin**	**6**	**2**
15	(Russia) E Likhovtseva	3	0	r
12	(Spain) M Serna	2	2
(Luxembourg) **A Kremer**	**6**	**6**
(China) J Zheng	4	**6**	4
(Switzerland) **M-G Mikaelian**	**6**	1	**6**
Q	(Italy) **R Vinci**	**6**	**6**
Q	(Russia) M Kirilenko	4	3

Second round
1	(Russia) N Petrova	4	**6**	4
(Japan) **S Asagoe**	**6**	2	**6**
(Slovakia) D Hantuchová	0	1^{r}
(France) **T Golovin**	**6**	3
(Luxembourg) **A Kremer**	**6**	5
(Switzerland) M-G Mikaelian	4	0^{r}
Q	(Italy) **R Vinci**	**6**	4	**7^{7}**
6	(France) N Dechy	0	**6**	6^{5}

Third round
(Japan) S Asagoe	4	0
(France) **T Golovin**	**6**	**6**
(Luxembourg) **A Kremer**	**6**	1	**7^{7}**
Q	(Italy) R Vinci	2	**6**	6^{3}

Quarterfinals
(France) **T Golovin**	**6**	**7**
(Luxembourg) A Kremer	4	5

==== Section 2 ====
First round
(Serbia and Montenegro) A Ivanovic	4	4
(Germany) **A Barna**	**6**	**6**
Q	(Russia) A Jidkova	**6**	6^{2}	2
(Thailand) **T Tanasugarn**	1	**7^{7}**	**6**
(United States) **J Craybas**	**7^{7}**	5	**6**
13	(Luxembourg) C Schaul	6^{2}	**7**	1
9	(France) **É Loit**	**6**	**7**
WC	(United Kingdom) J O'Donoghue	4	5
(Zimbabwe) **C Black**	6^{6}	**6**	**7^{7}**
(Italy) R Grande	**7^{8}**	2	6^{4}
LL	(France) S Cohen-Aloro	1	3
(Japan) **A Morigami**	**6**	**6**

Second round
4	(Bulgaria) **M Maleeva**	3	**6**	**6**
(Germany) A Barna	**6**	4	3
(Thailand) **T Tanasugarn**	**6**	**7**
(United States) J Craybas	1	5
9	(France) **É Loit**	**6**	6^{2}	**6**
(Zimbabwe) C Black	1	**7^{7}**	3
(Japan) **A Morigami**	2	**6**	**2**
7	(Greece) E Daniilidou	**6**	2	0/r

Third round
4	(Bulgaria) M Maleeva	**6**	4	2
(Thailand) **T Tanasugarn**	0	**6**	**6**
9	(France) **É Loit**	**6**	**7^{7}**
(Japan) A Morigami	4	6^{4}

Quarterfinals
(Thailand) T Tanasugarn	2	4
9	(France) **É Loit**	**6**	**6**

=== Bottom half ===
==== Section 3 ====
First round
(Italy) **F Pennetta**	1
(France) M Bartoli	1^{r}
(Serbia and Montenegro) **J Janković**	**7**	2	**6**
Q	(Ukraine) T Perebiynis	5	**6**	4
(Spain) **V Ruano Pascual**	**6**	**6**
10	(Venezuela) M Vento-Kabchi	2	3
14	(Russia) L Krasnoroutskaya	**6**	3	0
Q	(Venezuela) **M Sequera**	3	**6**	**6**
WC	(United Kingdom) E Baltacha	3	2
Q	(Australia) **S Stosur**	**6**	**6**
(Italy) M Santangelo	4	2
(United States) **J Jackson**	**6**	**6**

Second round
8	(Australia) **A Molik**	**7^{7}**	**6**
(Italy) F Pennetta	6^{3}	4
(Serbia and Montenegro) **J Janković**	**6**	**6**
(Spain) V Ruano Pascual	1	0
Q	(Venezuela) M Sequera	**6**	4	6^{5}
Q	(Australia) **S Stosur**	0	**6**	**7^{7}**
(United States) J Jackson	2	2
3	(Russia) **M Sharapova**	**6**	**6**

Third round
8	(Australia) **A Molik**	**6**	**6**
(Serbia and Montenegro) J Janković	3	2
Q	(Australia) S Stosur	4	3
3	(Russia) **M Sharapova**	**6**	**6**

Quarterfinals
8	(Australia) A Molik	3	1
3	(Russia) **M Sharapova**	**6**	**6**

==== Section 4 ====
First round
(Czech Republic) B Strýcová	3	3
Q	(United States) **S Perry**	**6**	**6**
(Japan) **S Obata**	**6**	2	**6**
(Italy) M E Camerin	1	**6**	3
Q	(United States) **K McCain**	4	**6**	**6**
11	(Slovenia) T Pisnik	**6**	4	4
16	(Spain) **M Sánchez Lorenzo**	3	**6**	**6**
(Belgium) E Callens	**6**	4	3
WC	(United Kingdom) **A Keothavong**	**6**	5	**7^{7}**
(Spain) M Marrero	1	**7**	6^{4}
(Spain) **A Parra Santonja**	**6**	**6**
(Slovenia) K Srebotnik	3	3

Second round
5	(Serbia and Montenegro) J Dokić	4	6^{4}
Q	(United States) **S Perry**	**6**	**7^{7}**
(Japan) **S Obata**	**7**	**7**
Q	(United States) K McCain	5	5
16	(Spain) **M Sánchez Lorenzo**	**6**	4	**6**
WC	(United Kingdom) A Keothavong	3	**6**	4
(Spain) A Parra Santonja	2	**6**	1
2	(Switzerland) **P Schnyder**	**6**	4	**6**

Third round
Q	(United States) S Perry	6^{3}	1
(Japan) **S Obata**	**7^{7}**	**6**
16	(Spain) M Sánchez Lorenzo	4	3
2	(Switzerland) **P Schnyder**	**6**	**6**

Quarterfinals
(Japan) S Obata	3	4
2	(Switzerland) **P Schnyder**	**6**	**6**
