= 2003 DFS Classic =

- Date: 9–15 June
- Edition: 22nd
- Category: Tier III
- Draw: 56S / 16D
- Surface: Grass / outdoor
- Location: Birmingham, United Kingdom
- Venue: Edgbaston Priory Club

Champions

Singles
- (Bulgaria) Magdalena Maleeva

Doubles
- (Belgium) Els Callens / (United States) Meilen Tu
| ← 2002 · | Birmingham Classic | · 2004 → |

The 2003 DFS Classic was a women's tennis tournament played on grass courts at the Edgbaston Priory Club in Birmingham in the United Kingdom that was part of Tier III of the 2003 WTA Tour. It was the 22nd edition of the tournament and was held from 9 June until 15 June 2003. Third-seeded Magdalena Maleeva won the singles title.

== Finals ==
=== Singles ===
(Bulgaria) Magdalena Maleeva defeated (Japan) Shinobu Asagoe 6–1, 6–4

- It was Maleeva's 2nd title of the year and the 14th of her career.

=== Doubles ===
(Belgium) Els Callens / (United States) Meilen Tu defeated (Australia) Alicia Molik / (United States) Martina Navratilova 7–5, 6–4

- It was Callens' only title of the year and the 8th of her career. It was Tu's only title of the year and the 4th of her career.
