= 2005 DFS Classic =

- Date: 6–12 June
- Edition: 24th
- Category: Tier III
- Draw: 56S / 16D
- Surface: Grass
- Location: Birmingham, United Kingdom
- Venue: Edgbaston Priory Club

Champions

Singles
- (Russia) Maria Sharapova

Doubles
- (Slovakia) Daniela Hantuchová / (Japan) Ai Sugiyama
← 2004 ·	Birmingham Classic	· 2006 →

The 2005 DFS Classic was a women's tennis tournament played on grass courts at the Edgbaston Priory Club in Birmingham in the United Kingdom that was part of Tier III of the 2005 WTA Tour. The tournament was held from 6 June until 12 June 2005. First-seeded Maria Sharapova won the singles tile.

== Finals ==
=== Singles ===
(Russia) Maria Sharapova defeated (Serbia and Montenegro) Jelena Janković 6–2, 4–6, 6–1

- It was Sharapova's 3rd title of the year and the 13th of her career.

=== Doubles ===
(Slovakia) Daniela Hantuchová / (Japan) Ai Sugiyama defeated (Greece) Eleni Daniilidou / (United States) Jennifer Russell 6–2, 6–3

- It was Hantuchová's 1st title of the year and the 7th of her career. It was Sugiyama's only title of the year and the 37th of her career.
