= 2005 DFS Classic – Doubles =

Doubles
- 2005 DFS Classic

Final
- Champions: (Slovakia) Daniela Hantuchová (Japan) Ai Sugiyama
- Runners-up: (Greece) Eleni Daniilidou (United States) Jennifer Russell
- Score: 6–2, 6–3

Events
Singles	Doubles
← 2004 ·	Birmingham Classic	· 2006 →

Maria Kirilenko and Maria Sharapova were the defending champions but lost in the first round to Marion Bartoli and Tamarine Tanasugarn.

Daniela Hantuchová and Ai Sugiyama won in the final 6–2, 6–3 against Eleni Daniilidou and Jennifer Russell.

== Seeds ==
Champion seeds are indicated in bold text while text in italics indicates the round in which those seeds were eliminated.

1. (Zimbabwe) Cara Black / (South Africa) Liezel Huber (semifinals)
2. (Slovakia) **Daniela Hantuchová** / (Japan) **Ai Sugiyama (champions)**
3. (Australia) Nicole Pratt / (Venezuela) María Vento-Kabchi (quarterfinals)
4. (Australia) Bryanne Stewart / (Australia) Samantha Stosur (semifinals)

== Draw ==
=== Key ===
- Q = Qualifier
- WC = Wild card
- LL = Lucky loser
- Alt = Alternate
- SE = Special exempt
- PR = Protected ranking
- ITF = ITF entry
- JE = Junior exempt
- w/o = Walkover
- r = Retired
- d = Defaulted
- SR = Special ranking

=== Main draw ===
First round
1	(Zimbabwe) **C Black** (South Africa) **L Huber**	**7**	**6**
(Japan) S Asagoe (Italy) M E Camerin	5	3
WC	(United Kingdom) A Janes (United Kingdom) A Keothavong	**6**	2	5
(Australia) **L McShea** (Venezuela) **M Sequera**	3	**6**	**7**
3	(Australia) **N Pratt** (Venezuela) **M Vento-Kabchi**	**6**	3	**6**
(United States) J Craybas (Germany) M Weingärtner	1	**6**	2
(Greece) **E Daniilidou** (United States) **J Russell**	**7**	**6**
Q	(United States) L Granville (United States) C Gullickson	5	2
(France) **M Bartoli** (Thailand) **T Tanasugarn**	**6**	**6**
WC	(Russia) M Kirilenko (Russia) M Sharapova	4	0
(Belgium) E Callens (United States) M Tu	3	4
4	(Australia) **B Stewart** (Australia) **S Stosur**	**6**	**6**
(Luxembourg) C Schaul (Italy) A Serra Zanetti	2	4
(United States) **J Hopkins** (United States) **M Washington**	**6**	**6**
(Russia) A Jidkova (Ukraine) T Perebiynis	3	2
2	(Slovakia) **D Hantuchová** (Japan) **A Sugiyama**	**6**	**6**

Quarterfinals
1	(Zimbabwe) **C Black** (South Africa) **L Huber**	**7^{7}**	**7^{8}**
(Australia) L McShea (Venezuela) M Sequera	6^{3}	6^{6}
3	(Australia) N Pratt (Venezuela) M Vento-Kabchi	4	1
(Greece) **E Daniilidou** (United States) **J Russell**	**6**	**6**
(France) M Bartoli (Thailand) T Tanasugarn	6^{3}	3
4	(Australia) **B Stewart** (Australia) **S Stosur**	**7^{7}**	**6**
(United States) J Hopkins (United States) M Washington	**7**	3	4
2	(Slovakia) **D Hantuchová** (Japan) **A Sugiyama**	5	**6**	**6**

Semifinals
1	(Zimbabwe) C Black (South Africa) L Huber	4	6^{3}
(Greece) **E Daniilidou** (United States) **J Russell**	**6**	**7^{7}**
4	(Australia) B Stewart (Australia) S Stosur	4	4	r
2	(Slovakia) **D Hantuchová** (Japan) **A Sugiyama**	**6**	**3**

Final
(Greece) Eleni Daniilidou (United States) Jennifer Russell	2	3
2	(Slovakia) **Daniela Hantuchová** (Japan) **Ai Sugiyama**	**6**	**6**

=== Qualifying draw ===
First qualifying round			Final qualifying round
1	**(France) S Cohen-Aloro** **(Tunisia) S Sfar**	**9**
WC	(France) S Foretz (United Kingdom) K O'Brien	7	1	(France) S Cohen-Aloro (Tunisia) S Sfar	4	**7^{7}**	3
	(Japan) R Fujiwara (Serbia and Montenegro) J Janković	3	2	**(United States) L Granville** **(United States) C Gullickson**	**6**	6^{1}	**6**
2	**(United States) L Granville** **(United States) C Gullickson**	**8**
