= 2002 Canada Masters – Doubles =

Doubles
- 2002 Canada Masters and the Rogers AT&T Cup

Final
- Champions: (United States) Bob Bryan (United States) Mike Bryan
- Runners-up: (The Bahamas) Mark Knowles (Canada) Daniel Nestor
- Score: 4–6, 7–6^{(7–1)}, 6–3

Details
- Draw: 32
- Seeds: 8

Events
| Singles | men | women |
| Doubles | men | women |
- Canada Masters Rogers AT&T Cup

The 2002 Canada Masters doubles was the men's doubles event of the one hundred and thirteenth edition of the Canada Masters; a WTA Tier I tournament and the most prestigious men's tennis tournament held in Canada. Jiří Novák and David Rikl were the defending champions but they competed with different partners that year, Novák with Radek Štěpánek and Rikl with David Prinosil. Novak and Štěpánek lost in the second round to Mark Knowles and Daniel Nestor. Prinosil and Rikl lost in the semifinals to Bob Bryan and Mike Bryan. The Bryans won in the final 4–6, 7–6^{(7–1)}, 6–3 against Knowles and Nestor.

== Seeds ==
Champion seeds are indicated in bold text while text in italics indicates the round in which those seeds were eliminated.

1. (The Bahamas) Mark Knowles / (Canada) Daniel Nestor (final)
2. (United States) Donald Johnson / (United States) Jared Palmer (quarterfinals)
3. (India) Mahesh Bhupathi / (Belarus) Max Mirnyi (second round)
4. (Zimbabwe) Wayne Black / (Zimbabwe) Kevin Ullyett (second round)
5. (Czech Republic) Martin Damm / (Czech Republic) Cyril Suk (second round)
6. (United States) **Bob Bryan** / (United States) **Mike Bryan (champions)**
7. (Germany) David Prinosil / (Czech Republic) David Rikl (semifinals)
8. (Australia) Joshua Eagle / (Australia) Sandon Stolle (semifinals)

== Draw ==
Key

- Q = Qualifier
- WC = Wild card
- LL = Lucky loser
- Alt = Alternate
- ITF = ITF entry
- PR = Protected ranking
- SR = Special ranking
- SE = Special exempt
- JE = Junior exempt
- JR = Junior Accelerator Programme entrant
- CO = College Accelerator Programme entrant
- NG = Next Gen Accelerator Program entrant
- w/o = Walkover
- r = Retired
- d = Defaulted

=== Finals ===
| Final |
| 1 | (The Bahamas) Mark Knowles (Canada) Daniel Nestor | **6** | 6^{1} | 3 |
| 6 | (United States) **Bob Bryan** (United States) **Mike Bryan** | 4 | **7^{7}** | **6** |

=== Top half ===
First round
1 | (The Bahamas) **M Knowles** (Canada) **D Nestor** | **6** | **7^{7}**
(United Kingdom) T Henman (United States) T Martin | 4 | 6^{4}
(Czech Republic) **J Novák** (Czech Republic) **L Friedl** | **7^{7}** | **6**
(Belgium) X Malisse (Romania) A Pavel | 6^{3} | 3
WC | (Canada) M Ciszek (Canada) P Gubenco | 3 | 4
(Australia) **M Hill** (India) **L Paes** | **6** | **6**
(Slovakia) D Hrbatý (France) F Santoro | 3 | 2
5 | (Czech Republic) **M Damm** (Czech Republic) **C Suk** | **6** | **6**
4 | (Zimbabwe) **W Black** (Zimbabwe) **K Ullyett** | **6** | **7^{7}**
(South Africa) D Adams (Argentina) G Etlis | 3 | 6^{4}
(Switzerland) **R Federer** (South Africa) **W Ferreira** | **7** | **6**
(Russia) Y Kafelnikov (Russia) M Safin | 5 | 1
(France) A Clément (France) S Grosjean | 4 | 4
WC | (Canada) **S Larose** (Canada) **F Niemeyer** | **6** | **6**
(United States) R Leach (Australia) D Macpherson | 3 | 4
8 | (Australia) **J Eagle** (Australia) **S Stolle** | **6** | **6**

Second round
1 | (The Bahamas) **M Knowles** (Canada) **D Nestor** | **6** | **6**
(Czech Republic) J Novák (Czech Republic) L Friedl | 3 | 2
(Australia) **M Hill** (India) **L Paes** | **6** | 6^{3} | **6**
5 | (Czech Republic) M Damm (Czech Republic) C Suk | 3 | **7^{7}** | 4
4 | (Zimbabwe) W Black (Zimbabwe) K Ullyett | 3 | 5
(Switzerland) **R Federer** (South Africa) **W Ferreira** | **6** | **7**
WC | (Canada) S Larose (Canada) F Niemeyer | 6^{5} | 4
8 | (Australia) **J Eagle** (Australia) **S Stolle** | **7^{7}** | **6**

Quarterfinals
1 | (The Bahamas) **M Knowles** (Canada) **D Nestor** | **6** | **6**
(Australia) M Hill (India) L Paes | 3 | 4
(Switzerland) R Federer (South Africa) W Ferreira | 2 | **7^{7}** | 6^{3}
8 | (Australia) **J Eagle** (Australia) **S Stolle** | **6** | 6^{4} | **7^{7}**

Semifinals
1 | (The Bahamas) **M Knowles** (Canada) **D Nestor** | **7^{7}** | 4 | **7^{7}**
8 | (Australia) J Eagle (Australia) S Stolle | 6^{4} | **6** | 6^{4}

=== Bottom half ===
First round
7 | (Germany) **D Prinosil** (Czech Republic) **D Rikl** | **6** | 6^{6} | **6**
(United States) J-M Gambill (France) M Llodra | 3 | **7^{8}** | 2
(Australia) A Florent (South Africa) C Haggard | **6** | 6^{5} | 2
WC | (Canada) **F Dancevic** (Canada) **A Nisker** | 3 | **7^{7}** | **6**
(Czech Republic) T Cibulec (Czech Republic) D Vacek | 6^{5} | **6** | 0
(South Africa) **E Ferreira** (United States) **J Tarango** | **7^{7}** | 3 | **6**
(Morocco) Y El Aynaoui (Spain) T Robredo | 6^{3} | 3
3 | (India) **M Bhupathi** (Belarus) **M Mirnyi** | **7^{7}** | **6**
6 | (United States) **B Bryan** (United States) **M Bryan** | 6^{5} | **6** | **7**
(South Africa) R Koenig (Australia) A Kratzmann | **7^{7}** | 1 | 5
(France) **J Boutter** (Netherlands) **S Schalken** | **7** | **7**
(Australia) P Hanley (Japan) T Shimada | 5 | 5
(Argentina) **G Cañas** (Germany) **R Schüttler** | **6** | **6**
(United States) B MacPhie (Serbia and Montenegro) N Zimonjić | 2 | 4
ALT | (United States) D Bowen (United States) J Thomas | 2 | 4
2 | (United States) **D Johnson** (United States) **J Palmer** | **6** | **6**

Second round
7 | (Germany) **D Prinosil** (Czech Republic) **D Rikl** | **6** | **6**
WC | (Canada) F Dancevic (Canada) A Nisker | 4 | 2
(South Africa) **E Ferreira** (United States) **J Tarango** | **7** | **7**
3 | (India) M Bhupathi (Belarus) M Mirnyi | 5 | 5
6 | (United States) **B Bryan** (United States) **M Bryan** | **7^{7}** | **7^{7}**
(France) J Boutter (Netherlands) S Schalken | 6^{3} | 6^{2}
(Argentina) G Cañas (Germany) R Schüttler
2 | (United States) **D Johnson** (United States) **J Palmer** | w/o

Quarterfinals
7 | (Germany) **D Prinosil** (Czech Republic) **D Rikl** | **6** | **6**
(South Africa) E Ferreira (United States) J Tarango | 1 | 2
6 | (United States) **B Bryan** (United States) **M Bryan** | **7^{7}** | 6^{4} | **6**
2 | (United States) D Johnson (United States) J Palmer | 6^{5} | **7^{7}** | 3

Semifinals
7 | (Germany) D Prinosil (Czech Republic) D Rikl | **6** | 6^{5} | 3
6 | (United States) **B Bryan** (United States) **M Bryan** | 2 | **7^{7}** | **6**
