= 2003 DFS Classic – Doubles =

Doubles
- 2003 DFS Classic

Final
- Champions: (Belgium) Els Callens (United States) Meilen Tu
- Runners-up: (Australia) Alicia Molik (United States) Martina Navratilova
- Score: 7–5, 6–4

Events
Singles	Doubles
← 2002 ·	Birmingham Classic	· 2004 →

Shinobu Asagoe and Els Callens were the defending champions but they competed with different partners that year, Asagoe with Nana Miyagi and Callens with Meilen Tu.

Asagoe and Miyagi lost in the quarterfinals to Rika Fujiwara and Roberta Vinci.

Callens and Tu won in the final 7–5, 6–4 against Alicia Molik and Martina Navratilova.

== Seeds ==
Text in italics indicates the round in which those seeds were eliminated.

1. (Zimbabwe) Cara Black / (Russia) Elena Likhovtseva (withdrew)
2. (Russia) Elena Dementieva / (Switzerland) Emmanuelle Gagliardi (first round)
3. (South Africa) Liezel Huber / (Bulgaria) Magdalena Maleeva (first round)
4. (France) Nathalie Dechy / (France) Émilie Loit (first round)

== Draw ==
=== Key ===
- Q = Qualifier
- WC = Wild card
- LL = Lucky loser
- Alt = Alternate
- SE = Special exempt
- PR = Protected ranking
- ITF = ITF entry
- JE = Junior exempt
- w/o = Walkover
- r = Retired
- d = Defaulted
- SR = Special ranking

=== Main draw ===
First round
LL	(France) C Dhenin (Canada) S Jeyaseelan	6	7^{7}
WC	(United States) L Granville (United States) A Stevenson	4	6^{4}
(United States) C Morariu (Australia) R Stubbs	6^{1}	7^{7}	3/r
(Belgium) E Callens (United States) M Tu	7^{7}	6^{4}	3
3	(South Africa) L Huber (Bulgaria) M Maleeva	3	4
(Venezuela) M Vento-Kabchi (Indonesia) A Widjaja	6	6
(Greece) E Daniilidou (Australia) N Pratt	3	4
Q	(Australia) T Musgrave (Ukraine) E Tatarkova	6	6
(United States) N Arendt (Ukraine) T Perebiynis	3	6	3
(Chinese Taipei) J Lee (Indonesia) W Prakusya	6	3	6
WC	(Australia) A Molik (United States) M Navratilova	2	6	6
4	(France) N Dechy (France) É Loit	6	4	4
(Russia) E Kulikovskaya (United States) S Reeves	1	2
(Japan) S Asagoe (Japan) N Miyagi	6	6
(Japan) R Fujiwara (Italy) R Vinci	6^{5}	6	6
2	(Russia) E Dementieva (Switzerland) E Gagliardi	7^{7}	1	2

Quarterfinals
LL	(France) C Dhenin (Canada) S Jeyaseelan	1	4
(Belgium) E Callens (United States) M Tu	6	6
(Venezuela) M Vento-Kabchi (Indonesia) A Widjaja	2	6^{7}
Q	(Australia) T Musgrave (Ukraine) E Tatarkova	6	7^{9}
(Chinese Taipei) J Lee (Indonesia) W Prakusya	3	4
WC	(Australia) A Molik (United States) M Navratilova	6	6
(Japan) S Asagoe (Japan) N Miyagi	3	5
(Japan) R Fujiwara (Italy) R Vinci	6	7

Semifinals
(Belgium) E Callens (United States) M Tu	6	6
Q	(Australia) T Musgrave (Ukraine) E Tatarkova	4	4
WC	(Australia) A Molik (United States) M Navratilova	7^{10}	6
(Japan) R Fujiwara (Italy) R Vinci	6^{8}	4

Final
(Belgium) Els Callens (United States) Meilen Tu	7	6
WC	(Australia) Alicia Molik (United States) Martina Navratilova	5	4

=== Qualifying draw ===
First qualifying round			Final qualifying round
1	(Australia) T Musgrave (Ukraine) E Tatarkova
WC	(United Kingdom) E Baltacha (United Kingdom) J Pullin	w/o	1	(Australia) T Musgrave (Ukraine) E Tatarkova	8
	(France) C Dhenin (Canada) S Jeyaseelan	8		(France) C Dhenin (Canada) S Jeyaseelan	1
2	(Venezuela) M Sequera (United States) A Spears	6
