= 2005 DFS Classic – Singles =

Singles
- 2005 DFS Classic

Final
- Champion: (Russia) Maria Sharapova
- Runner-up: (Serbia and Montenegro) Jelena Janković
- Score: 6–2, 4–6, 6–1

Details
- Draw: 56 (8 Q / 4 WC )
- Seeds: 16

Events
| Singles | Doubles |
| ← 2004 · | Birmingham Classic | · 2006 → |

Maria Sharapova was the defending champion, and successfully defended her title, defeating Jelena Janković 6–2, 4–6, 6–1 in the final.

== Seeds ==
A champion seed is indicated in bold text while text in italics indicates the round in which that seed was eliminated. The top nine seeds received a bye to the second round.

1. (Russia) **Maria Sharapova (champion)**
2. (Australia) Alicia Molik (second round)
3. (Serbia and Montenegro) Jelena Janković (final)
4. (Russia) Elena Likhovtseva (withdrew because of a left thigh injury)
5. (France) Tatiana Golovin (semifinals)
6. (Japan) Shinobu Asagoe (third round)
7. (Slovakia) Daniela Hantuchová (second round)
8. (Japan) Ai Sugiyama (third round)
9. (France) Marion Bartoli (second round)
10. (Czech Republic) Nicole Vaidišová (second round)
11. (France) Virginie Razzano (second round)
12. (Russia) Evgenia Linetskaya (second round)
13. (Germany) Anna-Lena Grönefeld (first round)
14. (United States) Lisa Raymond (first round)
15. (Russia) Maria Kirilenko (second round)
16. (Australia) Samantha Stosur (third round)
17. (Venezuela) María Vento-Kabchi (second round)

== Draw ==
=== Key ===
- Q = Qualifier
- WC = Wild card
- LL = Lucky loser
- Alt = Alternate
- SE = Special exempt
- PR = Protected ranking
- ITF = ITF entry
- JE = Junior exempt
- w/o = Walkover
- r = Retired
- d = Defaulted
- SR = Special ranking

=== Finals ===
Semifinals
1 | (Russia) **Maria Sharapova** | **7** | **6**
5 | (France) Tatiana Golovin | 5 | 1
3 | (Serbia and Montenegro) **Jelena Janković** | **6** | **6**
(United States) Laura Granville | 2 | 2

Final
1 | (Russia) **Maria Sharapova** | **6** | 4 | **6**
3 | (Serbia and Montenegro) Jelena Janković | 2 | **6** | 1

=== Top half ===
==== Section 1 ====
First round
(Ukraine) T Perebiynis | 5 | 2
(Luxembourg) **A Kremer** | **7** | **6**
Q | (Australia) **E Dominikovic** | **6** | **7^{7}**
(United States) M Shaughnessy | 4 | 6^{5}
(Italy) A Serra Zanetti | **7^{7}** | 3 | 2
16 | (Australia) **S Stosur** | 6^{3} | **6** | **6**
10 | (Czech Republic) **N Vaidišová** | **6** | **6**
Q | (France) S Cohen-Aloro | 3 | 2
(Greece) **E Daniilidou** | **6** | 1 | **6**
(South Korea) Y-J Cho | 1 | **6** | 4
WC | (Australia) **N Pratt** | **7** | **7**
LL | (Colombia) C Castaño | 5 | 5

Second round
1 | (Russia) **M Sharapova** | **6** | **6**
(Luxembourg) A Kremer | 3 | 0
Q | (Australia) E Dominikovic | 1 | **6** | 6^{2}
16 | (Australia) **S Stosur** | **6** | 1 | **7^{7}**
10 | (Czech Republic) N Vaidišová | 4 | 2
(Greece) **E Daniilidou** | **6** | **6**
WC | (Australia) N Pratt | 5 | 4
8 | (Japan) **A Sugiyama** | **7** | **6**

Third round
1 | (Russia) **M Sharapova** | **6** | 3 | **6**
16 | (Australia) S Stosur | 3 | **6** | 1
(Greece) **E Daniilidou** | **6** | **6**
8 | (Japan) A Sugiyama | 3 | 3

Quarterfinals
1 | (Russia) **M Sharapova** | **7** | 2 | **6**
(Greece) E Daniilidou | 5 | **6** | 1

==== Section 2 ====
First round
Q | (South Africa) **N Grandin** | **6** | **6**
(Slovakia) Ľ Cervanová | 1 | 4
Q | (Japan) **R Fujiwara** | 4 | **6** | **6**
(Russia) A Jidkova | **6** | 3 | 3
Q | (Japan) S Obata | 5 | **6** | 5
17 | (Venezuela) **M Vento-Kabchi** | **7** | 3 | **7**
12 | (Russia) **E Linetskaya** | **6** | **7^{7}**
(United States) A Spears | 2 | 6^{4}
(Russia) **A Chakvetadze** | **6** | **6**
(Spain) M Sánchez Lorenzo | 4 | 3
(Germany) M Weingärtner | 6^{5} | 2
Q | (United States) **M Tu** | **7^{7}** | **6**

Second round
5 | (France) **T Golovin** | **6** | **7**
Q | (South Africa) N Grandin | 4 | 5
Q | (Japan) **R Fujiwara** | **6** | **6**
17 | (Venezuela) M Vento-Kabchi | 2 | 2
12 | (Russia) E Linetskaya | **6** | 4 | 4
(Russia) **A Chakvetadze** | 4 | **6** | **6**
Q | (United States) M Tu | 1 | **6** | 1
6 | (Japan) **S Asagoe** | **6** | 4 | **6**

Third round
5 | (France) **T Golovin** | **6** | **6**
Q | (Japan) R Fujiwara | 4 | 4
(Russia) **A Chakvetadze** | **6** | **6**
6 | (Japan) S Asagoe | 4 | 4

Quarterfinals
5 | (France) **T Golovin** | **6** | **7^{7}**
(Russia) A Chakvetadze | 4 | 6^{3}

=== Bottom half ===
==== Section 3 ====
First round
(Spain) **A Parra Santonja** | **7^{7}** | **6**
(Italy) M E Camerin | 6^{4} | 4
(Russia) T Panova | 3 | 3
(United States) **M Washington** | **6** | **6**
(United States) C Gullickson | 4 | 6^{4}
11 | (France) **V Razzano** | **6** | **7^{7}**
14 | (United States) L Raymond | 1 | 0
Q | (Venezuela) **M Sequera** | **6** | **6**
(Ukraine) A Bondarenko | 6^{9} | 1
WC | (United Kingdom) **E Baltacha** | **7^{11}** | **6**
(India) **S Mirza** | **6** | **6**
(Luxembourg) C Schaul | 2 | 0

Second round
7 | (Slovakia) D Hantuchová | 4 | **7^{7}** | 6^{5}
(Spain) **A Parra Santonja** | **6** | 6^{3} | **7^{7}**
(United States) **M Washington** | **6** | 3 | **6**
11 | (France) V Razzano | 4 | **6** | 1
Q | (Venezuela) **M Sequera** | **6** | **6**
WC | (United Kingdom) E Baltacha | 4 | 2
(India) S Mirza | 1 | 5
3 | (Serbia and Montenegro) **J Janković** | **6** | **7**

Third round
(Spain) A Parra Santonja | 2 | 4
(United States) **M Washington** | **6** | **6**
Q | (Venezuela) M Sequera | 1 | 4
3 | (Serbia and Montenegro) **J Janković** | **6** | **6**

Quarterfinals
(United States) M Washington | 2 | 4
3 | (Serbia and Montenegro) **J Janković** | **6** | **6**

==== Section 4 ====
First round
(Thailand) **T Tanasugarn** | **6** | **6**
(Italy) R Vinci | 1 | 2
WC | (United Kingdom) A Janes | **6** | 1 | 6^{5}
(Japan) **A Morigami** | 3 | **6** | **7^{7}**
(France) **S Foretz** | **6** | **6**
13 | (Germany) A-L Grönefeld | 4 | 3
15 | (Russia) **M Kirilenko** | **6** | **6**
(Ukraine) Y Fedak | 3 | 2
(Puerto Rico) K Brandi | **6** | 5 | 0
Q | (United States) **J Jackson** | 3 | **7** | **6**
(United States) **L Granville** | **6** | **6**
WC | (United Kingdom) A Keothavong | 2 | 0

Second round
9 | (France) M Bartoli | 3 | 0
(Thailand) **T Tanasugarn** | **6** | **6**
(Japan) A Morigami | 5 | 3
(France) **S Foretz** | **7** | **6**
15 | (Russia) M Kirilenko | 2 | 3
Q | (United States) **J Jackson** | **6** | **6**
(United States) **L Granville** | **6** | **6**
2 | (Australia) A Molik | 4 | 2

Third round
(Thailand) **T Tanasugarn** | 2 | **6** | **6**
(France) S Foretz | **6** | 3 | 3
Q | (United States) J Jackson | 6^{5} | 4
(United States) **L Granville** | **7^{7}** | **6**

Quarterfinals
(Thailand) T Tanasugarn | 4 | 3
(United States) **L Granville** | **6** | **6**
