= 2002 Italian Open – Men's singles =

Men's singles
- 2002 Italian Open

Final
- Champion: (United States) Andre Agassi
- Runner-up: (Germany) Tommy Haas
- Score: 6–3, 6–3, 6–0

Details
- Draw: 64 (4WC/8Q)
- Seeds: 16

Events
Singles	men	women
Doubles	men	women
← 2001 ·	Italian Open	· 2003 →

Andre Agassi defeated Tommy Haas in the final, 6–3, 6–3, 6–0 to win the men's singles tennis title at the 2002 Italian Open.

Juan Carlos Ferrero was the defending champion, but lost in the second round to Ivan Ljubičić.

== Seeds ==
1. (Australia) Lleyton Hewitt (second round)
2. (Brazil) Gustavo Kuerten (second round)
3. (Spain) Juan Carlos Ferrero (second round)
4. (Russia) Yevgeny Kafelnikov (second round)
5. (United Kingdom) Tim Henman (first round)
6. (Russia) Marat Safin (second round)
7. (Germany) Tommy Haas (final)
8. (Sweden) Thomas Johansson (first round)
9. (United States) Andre Agassi (champion)
10. (France) Sébastien Grosjean (third round)
11. (Switzerland) Roger Federer (first round)
12. (United States) Pete Sampras (first round)
13. (United States) Andy Roddick (semifinals)
14. (Czech Republic) Jiří Novák (semifinals)
15. (Argentina) Guillermo Cañas (first round)
16. (Spain) Àlex Corretja (first round)

== Draw ==
=== Key ===
- Q = Qualifier
- WC = Wild card
- LL = Lucky loser
- Alt = Alternate
- ITF = ITF entry
- PR = Protected ranking
- SR = Special ranking
- SE = Special exempt
- JE = Junior exempt
- JR = Junior Accelerator Programme entrant
- CO = College Accelerator Programme entrant
- NG = Next Gen Accelerator Program entrant
- w/o = Walkover
- r = Retired
- d = Defaulted

=== Finals ===
Quarterfinals
(Spain) Carlos Moyá	3	4
7	(Germany) Tommy Haas	6	6
13	(United States) Andy Roddick	6	7^{7}
(Spain) Tommy Robredo	4	6^{2}
(United States) James Blake	6	6^{7}	4
14	(Czech Republic) Jiří Novák	3	7^{9}	6
9	(United States) Andre Agassi	6	6
(Spain) Albert Costa	2	2

Semifinals
7	(Germany) Tommy Haas	6	7
13	(United States) Andy Roddick	1	5
14	(Czech Republic) Jiří Novák	5	4
9	(United States) Andre Agassi	7	6

Final
7	(Germany) Tommy Haas	3	3	0
9	(United States) Andre Agassi	6	6	6

=== Top half ===
==== Section 1 ====
First round
1	(Australia) L Hewitt	6	6
(Sweden) J Björkman	2	3
(Czech Republic) B Ulihrach	3	6	1
(Spain) C Moyá	6	3	6
(Sweden) T Enqvist	2	1
(Sweden) M Norman	6	2^{r}
Q	(Austria) M Hipfl	6	6
15	(Argentina) G Cañas	4	4
10	(France) S Grosjean	6	6
(Morocco) H Arazi	4	0
(Argentina) D Nalbandian	6	5	6
(Spain) A Portas	3	7	3
Q	(Russia) N Davydenko	1	6	1
(Argentina) J I Chela	6	2	6
(Belarus) M Mirnyi	2	2
7	(Germany) T Haas	6	6

Second round
1	(Australia) L Hewitt	3	2
(Spain) C Moyá	6	6
(Sweden) T Enqvist	6	7^{9}
Q	(Austria) M Hipfl	4	6^{7}
10	(France) S Grosjean	5	6	7
(Argentina) D Nalbandian	7	4	5
(Argentina) J I Chela	5	1
7	(Germany) T Haas	7	6

Third round
(Spain) C Moyá	6	6
(Sweden) T Enqvist	2	1
10	(France) S Grosjean	3	4
7	(Germany) T Haas	6	6

Quarterfinals
(Spain) C Moyá	3	4
7	(Germany) T Haas	6	6

==== Section 2 ====
First round
4	(Russia) Y Kafelnikov	6	2
(Argentina) F Squillari	1	0^{r}
(South Africa) W Ferreira	6	6
(Argentina) G Gaudio	3	3
(Romania) A Pavel	6	7^{7}
(France) F Santoro	1	6^{4}
Q	(Spain) Á Calatrava	2	3
13	(United States) A Roddick	6	6
12	(United States) P Sampras	4	7^{7}	3
(Spain) F Mantilla	6	6^{3}	6
(Spain) T Robredo	7	6
WC	(Italy) F Volandri	5	4
(Belgium) X Malisse	6	6
Q	(Argentina) J Acasuso	1	4
(Spain) A Martín	2	2
6	(Russia) M Safin	6	6

Second round
4	(Russia) Y Kafelnikov	4	6	2
(South Africa) W Ferreira	6	4	6
(Romania) A Pavel	6	4	3
13	(United States) A Roddick	1	6	6
(Spain) F Mantilla	6^{2}	5
(Spain) T Robredo	7^{7}	7
(Belgium) X Malisse	6	6
6	(Russia) M Safin	3	4

Third round
(South Africa) W Ferreira	6	4	2
13	(United States) A Roddick	3	6	6
(Spain) T Robredo	6	6
(Belgium) X Malisse	2	4

Quarterfinals
13	(United States) A Roddick	6	7^{7}
(Spain) T Robredo	4	6^{2}

=== Bottom half ===
==== Section 3 ====
First round
5	(United Kingdom) T Henman	6	6^{5}	0
Q	(Chile) F González	3	7^{7}	6
(United Kingdom) G Rusedski	6	6^{1}	2
WC	(Italy) S Galvani	4	7^{7}	6
(Morocco) Y El Aynaoui	6	0	3
(United States) J Blake	4	6	6
(Italy) A Gaudenzi	6	6
11	(Switzerland) R Federer	4	4
14	(Czech Republic) J Novák	6	6
(Netherlands) S Schalken	4	4
(Australia) M Philippoussis	6	6
Q	(United States) V Spadea	2	2
(Croatia) I Ljubičić	6	6^{4}	6
WC	(Italy) F Luzzi	4	7^{7}	2
(Germany) R Schüttler	2	3^{r}
3	(Spain) J C Ferrero	6	4

Second round
Q	(Chile) F González	6	4	6
WC	(Italy) S Galvani	2	6	4
(United States) J Blake	3	6	6
(Italy) A Gaudenzi	6	4	1
14	(Czech Republic) J Novák	6	6
(Australia) M Philippoussis	4	1
(Croatia) I Ljubičić	7	6
3	(Spain) J C Ferrero	5	2

Third round
Q	(Chile) F González	6	3	3
(United States) J Blake	4	6	6
14	(Czech Republic) J Novák	6	6
(Croatia) I Ljubičić	4	1

Quarterfinals
(United States) J Blake	6	6^{7}	4
14	(Czech Republic) J Novák	3	7^{9}	6

==== Section 4 ====
First round
8	(Sweden) T Johansson	4	4
(France) A Clément	6	6
(Austria) S Koubek	2	6^{4}
(Argentina) A Calleri	6	7^{7}
Q	(Spain) F Clavet	6	5	3
(Switzerland) M Kratochvil	4	7	6
(Germany) N Kiefer	3	2
9	(United States) A Agassi	6	6
16	(Spain) À Corretja	2	6	3
WC	(Italy) G Galimberti	6	2	6
(Ecuador) N Lapentti	6	4	4
(Spain) A Costa	3	6	6
(Spain) A Montañés	6	6
Q	(Spain) G Blanco	2	4
(Italy) D Sanguinetti	5	3
2	(Brazil) G Kuerten	7	6

Second round
(France) A Clément	6^{5}	4
(Argentina) A Calleri	7^{7}	6
(Switzerland) M Kratochvil	0	1
9	(United States) A Agassi	6	6
WC	(Italy) G Galimberti	2	2
(Spain) A Costa	6	6
(Spain) A Montañés	6	3	6
2	(Brazil) G Kuerten	4	6	1

Third round
(Argentina) A Calleri	6^{4}	5
9	(United States) A Agassi	7^{7}	7
(Spain) A Costa	7^{7}	6
(Spain) A Montañés	6^{5}	3

Quarterfinals
9	(United States) A Agassi	6	6
(Spain) A Costa	2	2

== Qualifying ==
=== Qualifying seeds ===
1. (Chile) Fernando González (qualified)
2. (France) Julien Boutter (qualifying competition)
3. (Brazil) Fernando Meligeni (first round)
4. (Romania) Adrian Voinea (qualifying competition)
5. (Denmark) Kristian Pless (qualifying competition)
6. (France) Antony Dupuis (first round)
7. (Thailand) Paradorn Srichaphan (qualifying competition)
8. (Spain) Fernando Vicente (first round)
9. (Slovakia) Karol Kučera (first round)
10. (Germany) Lars Burgsmüller (first round)
11. (Georgia (country)) Irakli Labadze (first round)
12. (Paraguay) Ramón Delgado (qualifying competition)
13. (Belgium) Christophe Rochus (first round)
14. (Russia) Nikolay Davydenko (qualified)
15. (Austria) Markus Hipfl (qualified)
16. (Spain) Francisco Clavet (qualified)

=== Qualifiers ===
1. (Chile) Fernando González
2. (Spain) Francisco Clavet
3. (Russia) Nikolay Davydenko
4. (Spain) Álex Calatrava
5. (United States) Vince Spadea
6. (Argentina) José Acasuso
7. (Austria) Markus Hipfl
8. (Spain) Galo Blanco

=== Qualifying draw ===
==== First qualifier ====
First round
1	(Chile) Fernando González	4	6	6
(Sweden) Magnus Larsson	6	3	2
WC	(Italy) Potito Starace	3	4
12	(Paraguay) Ramón Delgado	6	6

Qualifying competition
1	(Chile) Fernando González	6	6
12	(Paraguay) Ramón Delgado	2	1

==== Second qualifier ====
First round
2	(France) Julien Boutter	6	6
(United States) Michael Russell	4	3
WC	(Italy) Andreas Seppi	6^{5}	0
16	(Spain) Francisco Clavet	7^{7}	6

Qualifying competition
2	(France) Julien Boutter	2	4
16	(Spain) Francisco Clavet	6	6

==== Third qualifier ====
First round
3	(Brazil) Fernando Meligeni	6^{4}	7^{7}	2
(France) Cédric Pioline	7^{7}	6^{3}	6
(Switzerland) Marc Rosset	3	1
14	(Russia) Nikolay Davydenko	6	6

Qualifying competition
(France) Cédric Pioline	4	2
14	(Russia) Nikolay Davydenko	6	6

==== Fourth qualifier ====
First round
4	(Romania) Adrian Voinea	6	6^{6}	6
WC	(Italy) Alessio di Mauro	3	7^{8}	4
(Spain) Álex Calatrava	6	6
13	(Belgium) Christophe Rochus	3	3

Qualifying competition
4	(Romania) Adrian Voinea	6	1	0
(Spain) Álex Calatrava	2	6	6

==== Fifth qualifier ====
First round
5	(Denmark) Kristian Pless	5	7^{7}	6
(France) Michaël Llodra	7	6^{0}	3
(United States) Vince Spadea	6	6
10	(Germany) Lars Burgsmüller	1	4

Qualifying competition
5	(Denmark) Kristian Pless	6^{5}	1
(United States) Vince Spadea	7^{7}	6

==== Sixth qualifier ====
First round
6	(France) Antony Dupuis	4	4
WC	(Italy) Vincenzo Santopadre	6	6
(Argentina) José Acasuso	6	3	6
11	(Georgia (country)) Irakli Labadze	2	6	1

Qualifying competition
WC	(Italy) Vincenzo Santopadre	2	7	3
(Argentina) José Acasuso	6	5	6

==== Seventh qualifier ====
First round
7	(Thailand) Paradorn Srichaphan	1
(Israel) Harel Levy	1^{r}
(Russia) Andrei Stoliarov	1	0^{r}
15	(Austria) Markus Hipfl	6	3

Qualifying competition
7	(Thailand) Paradorn Srichaphan	6	6^{2}	1
15	(Austria) Markus Hipfl	4	7^{7}	6

==== Eighth qualifier ====
First round
8	(Spain) Fernando Vicente	6^{3}	2
(Spain) Galo Blanco	7^{7}	6
(France) Nicolas Coutelot	6	6
9	(Slovakia) Karol Kučera	3	3

Qualifying competition
(Spain) Galo Blanco	2	6	6
(France) Nicolas Coutelot	6	2	3
