= 2002 DFS Classic =

- Date: 10–16 June
- Edition: 21st
- Category: Tier III
- Draw: 56S / 16D
- Surface: Grass / outdoor
- Location: Birmingham, United Kingdom
- Venue: Edgbaston Priory Club

Champions

Singles
- (Federal Republic of Yugoslavia) Jelena Dokić

Doubles
- (Japan) Shinobu Asagoe / (Belgium) Els Callens
← 2001 ·	Birmingham Classic	· 2003 →

The 2002 DFS Classic was a women's tennis tournament played on grass courts at the Edgbaston Priory Club in Birmingham in the United Kingdom that was part of Tier III of the 2002 WTA Tour. It was the 21st edition of the tournament and was held from 10 June until 16 June 2002. First-seeded Jelena Dokić won the singles title.

== Finals ==
=== Singles ===
(Federal Republic of Yugoslavia) Jelena Dokić defeated (Russia) Anastasia Myskina 6–2, 6–3

- It was Dokić's 3rd title of the year and the 7th of her career.

=== Doubles ===
(Japan) Shinobu Asagoe / (Belgium) Els Callens defeated (United States) Kimberly Po-Messerli / (France) Nathalie Tauziat 6–4, 6–3

- It was Asagoe's 1st title of the year and the 1st of her career. It was Callens' only title of the year and the 7th of her career.
