= 2002 Rogers AT&T Cup – Singles =

Singles
- 2002 Canada Masters and the Rogers AT&T Cup

Final
- Champion: (France) Amélie Mauresmo
- Runner-up: (United States) Jennifer Capriati
- Score: 6–4, 6–1

Details
- Draw: 56 (4WC/12Q/2LL)
- Seeds: 16

Events
Singles	men	women
Doubles	men	women
- Canada Masters Rogers AT&T Cup

Amélie Mauresmo defeated Jennifer Capriati in the final, 6–4, 6–1 to win the women's singles tennis title at the 2002 Canadian Open.

Serena Williams was the reigning champion, but withdrew due to a left knee injury.

== Seeds ==
The top eight seeds received a bye into the second round.

1. (United States) ~~Serena Williams~~ (withdrew due to a left knee injury)
2. (United States) Jennifer Capriati (final)
3. (Serbia and Montenegro) Jelena Dokić (semifinals, retired due to a right thigh strain)
4. (Belgium) Kim Clijsters (third round)
5. (Belgium) Justine Henin (quarterfinals)
6. (Switzerland) Martina Hingis (quarterfinals)
7. (France) Amélie Mauresmo (champion)
8. (Slovakia) Daniela Hantuchová (semifinals)
9. (Russia) Elena Dementieva (second round)
10. (Italy) Silvia Farina Elia (second round)
11. (Russia) Anastasia Myskina (first round)
12. (Czech Republic) Dája Bedáňová (second round)
13. (Israel) Anna Smashnova (first round)
14. (Luxembourg) Anne Kremer (first round)
15. (United States) Lisa Raymond (first round)
16. (United States) Chanda Rubin (second round)

== Draw ==
Key

- Q = Qualifier
- WC = Wild card
- LL = Lucky loser
- Alt = Alternate
- ITF = ITF entry
- PR = Protected ranking
- SR = Special ranking
- SE = Special exempt
- JE = Junior exempt
- JR = Junior Accelerator Programme entrant
- CO = College Accelerator Programme entrant
- NG = Next Gen Accelerator Program entrant
- w/o = Walkover
- r = Retired
- d = Defaulted

=== Finals ===
Quarterfinals
(Colombia) Fabiola Zuluaga	0	2
7	(France) Amélie Mauresmo	6	6
(Austria) Barbara Schett	3	3
8	(Slovakia) Daniela Hantuchová	6	6
6	(Switzerland) Martina Hingis	4	3
3	(Serbia and Montenegro) Jelena Dokić	6	6
5	(Belgium) Justine Henin	6	0	2
2	(United States) Jennifer Capriati	4	6	6

Semifinals
7	(France) Amélie Mauresmo	6	7
8	(Slovakia) Daniela Hantuchová	2	6^{3}
3	(Serbia and Montenegro) Jelena Dokić	6^{5}	0^{r}
2	(United States) Jennifer Capriati	7	4

Final
7	(France) Amélie Mauresmo	6	6
2	(United States) Jennifer Capriati	4	1

=== Top half ===
==== Section 1 ====
First round
(Uzbekistan) I Tulyaganova	1	2
(Colombia) F Zuluaga	6	6
Q	(Japan) S Obata	3	1
WC	(Russia) A Kournikova	6	6
Q	(Spain) V Ruano Pascual	6	6
14	(Luxembourg) A Kremer	1	0
10	(Italy) S Farina Elia	6	7
WC	(Canada) M Drake	2	5
Q	(United States) L Granville	6	6
(Spain) A Sánchez Vicario	2	2
(Spain) C Torrens Valero	7	2	6
Q	(Belgium) E Callens	6^{3}	6	3

Second round
LL	(United States) M Tu	3	6	1
(Colombia) F Zuluaga	6	2	6
WC	(Russia) A Kournikova	5	1
Q	(Spain) V Ruano Pascual	7	6
10	(Italy) S Farina Elia	2	1
Q	(United States) L Granville	6	6
(Spain) C Torrens Valero	1	2
7	(France) A Mauresmo	6	6

Third round
(Colombia) F Zuluaga	6	6
Q	(Spain) V Ruano Pascual	3	2
Q	(United States) L Granville	6^{7}	6^{5}
7	(France) A Mauresmo	7	7

Quarterfinals
(Colombia) F Zuluaga	0	2
7	(France) A Mauresmo	6	6

==== Section 2 ====
First round
Q	(Belarus) T Poutchek	1	3
(Australia) N Pratt	6	6
Q	(United States) M Irvin	6	3	4
(Austria) B Schett	1	6	6
(Russia) T Panova	1	3
16	(United States) C Rubin	6	6
9	(Russia) E Dementieva	6	6
(Italy) A Serra Zanetti	3	4
(South Africa) A Coetzer	6	6
Q	(Zimbabwe) C Black	2	2
(Switzerland) P Schnyder	7	7
(Russia) E Likhovtseva	6^{4}	5

Second round
4	(Belgium) K Clijsters	6	3	6
(Australia) N Pratt	4	6	1
(Austria) B Schett	6	6
16	(United States) C Rubin	4	4
9	(Russia) E Dementieva	3	3
(South Africa) A Coetzer	6	6
(Switzerland) P Schnyder	3	6^{3}
8	(Slovakia) D Hantuchová	6	7

Third round
4	(Belgium) K Clijsters	4	4
(Austria) B Schett	6	6
(South Africa) A Coetzer	1	3
8	(Slovakia) D Hantuchová	6	6

Quarterfinals
(Austria) B Schett	3	3
8	(Slovakia) D Hantuchová	6	6

=== Bottom half ===
==== Section 3 ====
First round
Q	(Spain) M Serna	6	2	6
Q	(Paraguay) R de los Ríos	3	6	2
(Croatia) I Majoli	3	1
(France) N Dechy	6	6
(Argentina) C Fernández	6	6
11	(Russia) A Myskina	3	1
13	(Israel) A Smashnova	2	6^{4}
(United States) A Stevenson	6	7
(Thailand) T Tanasugarn	6	6
(Slovenia) T Pisnik	0	1
(Slovakia) M Suchá	6	6
(Slovakia) J Husárová	2	2

Second round
6	(Switzerland) M Hingis	6	6
Q	(Spain) M Serna	4	3
(France) N Dechy	3	6	4
(Argentina) C Fernández	6	4	6
(United States) A Stevenson	6	5	6
(Thailand) T Tanasugarn	3	7	4
(Slovakia) M Suchá	3	4
3	(Serbia and Montenegro) J Dokić	6	6

Third round
6	(Switzerland) M Hingis	6	6
(Argentina) C Fernández	4	2
(United States) A Stevenson	6	5	1
3	(Serbia and Montenegro) J Dokić	1	7	6

Quarterfinals
6	(Switzerland) M Hingis	4	3
3	(Serbia and Montenegro) J Dokić	6	6

==== Section 4 ====
First round
Q	(Slovakia) N Nagyová	7	6^{4}	7
WC	(France) M Pierce	6^{7}	7	5
LL	(Italy) F Schiavone	6^{10}	6	6
(Greece) E Daniilidou	7	4	4
Q	(United States) J Craybas	6	1	4
12	(Czech Republic) D Bedáňová	2	6	6
15	(United States) L Raymond	3	1
(Japan) A Sugiyama	6	6
(Argentina) P Suárez	6	6
(Italy) R Grande	0	4
Q	(United States) S Taylor	6	6
WC	(Canada) J Nejedly	1	0

Second round
5	(Belgium) J Henin	5	6	4
Q	(Slovakia) N Nagyová	7	0	1 r
LL	(Italy) F Schiavone	4	6	6
12	(Czech Republic) D Bedáňová	6	4	2
(Japan) A Sugiyama	3	6	6
(Argentina) P Suárez	6	4	2
Q	(United States) S Taylor	4	1
2	(United States) J Capriati	6	6

Third round
5	(Belgium) J Henin	6	7
LL	(Italy) F Schiavone	3	6^{2}
(Japan) A Sugiyama	1	5
2	(United States) J Capriati	6	7

Quarterfinals
5	(Belgium) J Henin	6	0	2
2	(United States) J Capriati	4	6	6

== Qualifying ==
=== Qualifying seeds ===
1. (Slovenia) Katarina Srebotnik (first round)
2. (Slovakia) Henrieta Nagyová (qualified)
3. (Italy) Francesca Schiavone (qualifying competition, lucky loser)
4. (United States) Meilen Tu (qualifying competition, lucky loser)
5. (Switzerland) Emmanuelle Gagliardi (first round)
6. (United States) Marissa Irvin (qualified)
7. (Spain) Magüi Serna (qualified)
8. (France) Émilie Loit (first round)
9. (Russia) Vera Zvonareva (qualifying competition)
10. (United States) Amy Frazier (qualifying competition)
11. (Switzerland) Marie-Gaïané Mikaelian (first round)
12. (Belarus) Tatiana Poutchek (qualified)
13. (United States) Samantha Reeves (qualifying competition)
14. (Zimbabwe) Cara Black (qualified)
15. (Russia) Alina Jidkova (qualifying competition)
16. (Spain) Virginia Ruano Pascual (qualified)
17. (United States) Jennifer Hopkins (first round)
18. (Australia) Alicia Molik (qualifying competition)
19. (Austria) Barbara Schwartz (first round)
20. (Germany) Marlene Weingärtner (first round)
21. (Indonesia) Wynne Prakusya (qualifying competition)
22. (Indonesia) Angelique Widjaja (first round)
23. (United States) Jill Craybas (qualified)
24. (Paraguay) Rossana de los Ríos (qualified)

=== Qualifiers ===
1. (Paraguay) Rossana de los Ríos
2. (Slovakia) Henrieta Nagyová
3. (United States) Sarah Taylor
4. (Zimbabwe) Cara Black
5. (Spain) Virginia Ruano Pascual
6. (United States) Marissa Irvin
7. (Spain) Magüi Serna
8. (United States) Jill Craybas
9. (United States) Laura Granville
10. (Belgium) Els Callens
11. (Japan) Saori Obata
12. (Belarus) Tatiana Poutchek

=== Lucky losers ===
1. (Italy) Francesca Schiavone
2. (United States) Meilen Tu

=== Qualifying draw ===
==== First qualifier ====
First round
1	(Slovenia) Katarina Srebotnik	3	2
WC	(Canada) Sonya Jeyaseelan	6	6
(United States) Lilia Osterloh	1	6^{3}
24	(Paraguay) Rossana de los Ríos	6	7^{7}

Qualifying competition
WC	(Canada) Sonya Jeyaseelan	2	1
24	(Paraguay) Rossana de los Ríos	6	6

==== Second qualifier ====
First round
2	(Slovakia) Henrieta Nagyová	6	6
WC	(Canada) Mélanie Marois	1	4
(United Kingdom) Julie Pullin	5	6^{3}
21	(Indonesia) Wynne Prakusya	7	7^{7}

Qualifying competition
2	(Slovakia) Henrieta Nagyová	6	6
21	(Indonesia) Wynne Prakusya	1	3

==== Third qualifier ====
First round
3	(Italy) Francesca Schiavone	7	6
(Italy) Roberta Vinci	5	3
(United States) Sarah Taylor	6	6
22	(Indonesia) Angelique Widjaja	2	0

Qualifying competition
3	(Italy) Francesca Schiavone	7^{7}	2	1
(United States) Sarah Taylor	6^{2}	6	6

==== Fourth qualifier ====
First round
4	(United States) Meilen Tu	6	6
(Italy) Antonella Serra Zanetti	4	4
(Chinese Taipei) Janet Lee	2	6	3
14	(Zimbabwe) Cara Black	6	3	6

Qualifying competition
4	(United States) Meilen Tu	2	1
14	(Zimbabwe) Cara Black	6	6

==== Fifth qualifier ====
First round
5	(Switzerland) Emmanuelle Gagliardi	0	6	0
(Russia) Elena Bovina	6	2	6
(Tunisia) Selima Sfar	0	2
16	(Spain) Virginia Ruano Pascual	6	6

Qualifying competition
(Russia) Elena Bovina	5	6	2
16	(Spain) Virginia Ruano Pascual	7	2	6

==== Sixth qualifier ====
First round
6	(United States) Marissa Irvin	6	6
(France) Stéphanie Foretz	2	3
WC	(Canada) Renata Kolbovic	4	2
13	(United States) Samantha Reeves	6	6

Qualifying competition
6	(United States) Marissa Irvin	6	6
13	(United States) Samantha Reeves	4	2

==== Seventh qualifier ====
First round
7	(Spain) Magüi Serna	4	7^{8}	6
(United States) Brie Rippner	6	6^{6}	3
WC	(Canada) Beier Ko	6	1	6
20	(Germany) Marlene Weingärtner	4	6	4

Qualifying competition
7	(Spain) Magüi Serna	6	6
WC	(Canada) Beier Ko	4	3

==== Eighth qualifier ====
First round
8	(France) Émilie Loit	3	2
(Germany) Angelika Rösch	6	6
(Canada) Vanessa Webb	6^{6}	0
23	(United States) Jill Craybas	7^{8}	6

Qualifying competition
(Germany) Angelika Rösch	4	6	3
23	(United States) Jill Craybas	6	4	6

==== Ninth qualifier ====
First round
9	(Russia) Vera Zvonareva	6	6
(Kazakhstan) Irina Selyutina	2	1
(United States) Laura Granville	6^{3}	6	6
19	(Austria) Barbara Schwartz	7^{7}	4	2

Qualifying competition
9	(Russia) Vera Zvonareva	3	1
(United States) Laura Granville	6	6

==== Tenth qualifier ====
First round
10	(United States) Amy Frazier	6	6
(Spain) Marta Marrero	2	2
(Belgium) Els Callens	6	6
17	(United States) Jennifer Hopkins	2	3

Qualifying competition
10	(United States) Amy Frazier	6	2	6^{6}
(Belgium) Els Callens	2	6	7^{8}

==== Eleventh qualifier ====
First round
11	(Switzerland) Marie-Gaïané Mikaelian	3	3
(Japan) Saori Obata	6	6
(Germany) Jana Kandarr	4	2
15	(Russia) Alina Jidkova	6	6

Qualifying competition
(Japan) Saori Obata	2	6	6
15	(Russia) Alina Jidkova	6	4	0

==== Twelfth qualifier ====
First round
12	(Belarus) Tatiana Poutchek	4	6	6
WC	(Canada) Marie-Ève Pelletier	6	3	3
WC	(Canada) Stéphanie Dubois	4	5
18	(Australia) Alicia Molik	6	7

Qualifying competition
12	(Belarus) Tatiana Poutchek	2	6	6
18	(Australia) Alicia Molik	6	4	4
