= 2002 Canada Masters – Singles =

Singles
- 2002 Canada Masters and the Rogers AT&T Cup

Final
- Champion: (Argentina) Guillermo Cañas
- Runner-up: (United States) Andy Roddick
- Score: 6–4, 7–5

Details
- Draw: 64
- Seeds: 16

Events
Singles	men	women
Doubles	men	women
- Canada Masters Rogers AT&T Cup

Guillermo Cañas defeated Andy Roddick in the final, 6–4, 7–5 to win the men's singles tennis title at the 2002 Canada Masters.

Andrei Pavel was the defending champion, but lost in the second round to Marat Safin.

== Seeds ==
A champion seed is indicated in bold text while text in italics indicates the round in which that seed was eliminated.

1. (Australia) Lleyton Hewitt (first round)
2. (Russia) Marat Safin (quarterfinals)
3. (Germany) Tommy Haas (semifinals)
4. (United Kingdom) Tim Henman (third round)
5. (Russia) Yevgeny Kafelnikov (third round)
6. (Spain) Albert Costa (first round)
7. (United States) ~~Andre Agassi~~ (withdrew due to a hip strain)
8. (Spain) Juan Carlos Ferrero (second round)
9. (Sweden) Thomas Johansson (second round)
10. (Switzerland) Roger Federer (first round)
11. (France) Sébastien Grosjean (quarterfinals)
12. (United States) Andy Roddick (final)
13. (United States) Pete Sampras (third round)
14. (Czech Republic) Jiří Novák (semifinals)
15. (Argentina) David Nalbandian (quarterfinals)
16. (Spain) Carlos Moyá (second round)

== Draw ==
Key

- Q = Qualifier
- WC = Wild card
- LL = Lucky loser
- Alt = Alternate
- ITF = ITF entry
- PR = Protected ranking
- SR = Special ranking
- SE = Special exempt
- JE = Junior exempt
- JR = Junior Accelerator Programme entrant
- CO = College Accelerator Programme entrant
- NG = Next Gen Accelerator Program entrant
- w/o = Walkover
- r = Retired
- d = Defaulted

=== Finals ===
Quarterfinals
14	**(Czech Republic) Jiří Novák**	**7**	**6**
11	(France) Sébastien Grosjean	5	3
15	(Argentina) David Nalbandian	3	2
12	**(United States) Andy Roddick**	**6**	**6**
(France) Fabrice Santoro	4	**6**	3
3	**(Germany) Tommy Haas**	**6**	4	**6**
**(Argentina) Guillermo Cañas**	**7**	**6**
2	(Russia) Marat Safin	5	3

Semifinals
14	(Czech Republic) Jiří Novák	4	3
12	(United States) **Andy Roddick**	**6**	**6**
3	(Germany) Tommy Haas	4	**6**	6^{5}
(Argentina) **Guillermo Cañas**	**6**	3	**7^{7}**

Final
12	(United States) Andy Roddick	4	5
(Argentina) **Guillermo Cañas**	**6**	**7**

=== Top half ===
==== Section 1 ====
First round
1	(Australia) L Hewitt	**6**	4	3
(Spain) **F Mantilla**	2	**6**	**6**
Q	(United States) **T Dent**	**6**	**6**
(Sweden) M Norman	1	2
(Italy) D Sanguinetti	6^{6}	4
(Argentina) **M Zabaleta**	**7^{8}**	**6**
(Belgium) X Malisse	3	3
14	(Czech Republic) **J Novák**	**6**	**6**
11	(France) **S Grosjean**	3	**7^{7}**	**6**
(Czech Republic) B Ulihrach	**6**	6^{5}	4
(Finland) **J Nieminen**	**7**	**6**
(Netherlands) R Krajicek	5	1
LL	(Czech Republic) **R Štěpánek**	**6**	2	**6**
Q	(United States) A Kim	2	**6**	3
Q	(United States) **V Spadea**	**6**	**6**
6	(Spain) A Costa	3	1

Second round
(Spain) F Mantilla	6^{2}	5
Q	(United States) **T Dent**	**7^{7}**	**7**
(Argentina) M Zabaleta	1	3
14	(Czech Republic) **J Novák**	**6**	**6**
11	(France) **S Grosjean**	**6**	**6**
(Finland) J Nieminen	2	4
LL	(Czech Republic) **R Štěpánek**	**7^{7}**	**7^{7}**
Q	(United States) V Spadea	6^{4}	6^{3}

Third round
Q	(United States) T Dent	5	3
14	(Czech Republic) **J Novák**	**7**	**6**
11	(France) **S Grosjean**	**6**	**6**
LL	(Czech Republic) R Štěpánek	2	2

Quarterfinals
14	(Czech Republic) **J Novák**	**7**	**6**
11	(France) S Grosjean	5	3

==== Section 2 ====
First round
4	(United Kingdom) **T Henman**	**6**	**6**
(Spain) F Vicente	4	4
(United States) **J Blake**	**6**	**6**
WC	(Canada) S Larose	2	1
(Germany) R Schüttler	3	**6**	6^{4}
(Spain) **T Robredo**	**6**	3	**7^{7}**
Q	(France) C Saulnier	4	3
15	(Argentina) **D Nalbandian**	**6**	**6**
12	(United States) **A Roddick**	**6**	**6**
(Slovakia) D Hrbatý	2	4
(Ecuador) **N Lapentti**	**7^{7}**	**7^{7}**
(Argentina) G Gaudio	6^{2}	6^{2}
(Chile) F González	**6**	6^{3}	3
(Austria) **S Koubek**	4	**7**	**6**
(Sweden) T Enqvist	6^{5}	**7^{7}**	5
8	(Spain) **J C Ferrero**	**7^{7}**	6^{4}	**7**

Second round
4	(United Kingdom) **T Henman**	**6**	**6**
(United States) J Blake	3	3
(Spain) T Robredo	6^{1}	3
15	(Argentina) **D Nalbandian**	**7^{7}**	**6**
12	(United States) **A Roddick**	**6**	3	**7^{7}**
(Ecuador) N Lapentti	4	**6**	6^{5}
(Austria) **S Koubek**	**7**	**6**
8	(Spain) J C Ferrero	5	3

Third round
4	(United Kingdom) T Henman	**6**	6^{7}	5
15	(Argentina) **D Nalbandian**	4	**7^{9}**	**7**
12	(United States) **A Roddick**	**6**	**6**
(Austria) S Koubek	3	3

Quarterfinals
15	(Argentina) D Nalbandian	3	2
12	(United States) **A Roddick**	**6**	**6**

=== Bottom half ===
==== Section 3 ====
First round
LL	(Denmark) **K Pless**	**6**	4	**6**
WC	(Canada) D Nestor	3	**6**	2
WC	(Canada) F Dancevic	5	3
(France) **F Santoro**	**7**	**6**
(United Kingdom) G Rusedski	**6**	6^{4}	5
(United States) **T Martin**	3	**7^{7}**	**7**
(Croatia) I Ljubičić	**6**	4	6^{6}
9	(Sweden) **T Johansson**	4	**6**	**7^{8}**
13	(United States) **P Sampras**	**7^{8}**	5	**6**
(South Africa) W Ferreira	6^{6}	**7**	4
Q	(South Korea) **H-T Lee**	**6**	**6**
(France) A Clément	3	3
(Netherlands) **S Schalken**	**6**	**6**
Q	(Zimbabwe) W Black	3	3
WC	(Canada) F Niemeyer	3	3
3	(Germany) **T Haas**	**6**	**6**

Second round
LL	(Denmark) K Pless	**6**	2	6^{4}
(France) **F Santoro**	4	**6**	**7^{7}**
(United States) **T Martin**	**7^{7}**	**6**
9	(Sweden) T Johansson	6^{5}	3
13	(United States) **P Sampras**	3	**7^{7}**	**6**
Q	(South Korea) H-T Lee	**6**	6^{5}	2
(Netherlands) S Schalken	3	**6**	3
3	(Germany) **T Haas**	**6**	3	**6**

Third round
(France) **F Santoro**	**6**	**6**
(United States) T Martin	2	4
13	(United States) P Sampras	6^{3}	**6**	6^{5}
3	(Germany) **T Haas**	**7^{7}**	3	**7^{7}**

Quarterfinals
(France) F Santoro	4	**6**	3
3	(Germany) **T Haas**	**6**	4	**6**

==== Section 4 ====
First round
5	(Russia) **Y Kafelnikov**	**6**	6^{5}	**6**
(Belarus) M Mirnyi	4	**7^{7}**	2
(Morocco) **Y El Aynaoui**	**6**	2	**6**
(Germany) N Kiefer	4	**6**	4
(Switzerland) M Kratochvil	3	**7^{8}**	6^{3}
Q	(Thailand) **P Srichaphan**	**6**	6^{6}	**7^{7}**
(Argentina) **G Cañas**	**7^{12}**	**7**
10	(Switzerland) R Federer	6^{10}	5
16	(Spain) **C Moyá**	**7^{7}**	**6**
(France) J Boutter	6^{5}	4
Q	(Denmark) K Carlsen	6^{5}	6^{6}
(Chile) **M Ríos**	**7^{7}**	**7^{8}**
(Romania) **A Pavel**	**7**
(Brazil) G Kuerten	5	r
(Argentina) J I Chela	4	3
2	(Russia) **M Safin**	**6**	**6**

Second round
5	(Russia) **Y Kafelnikov**	6^{4}	**6**	**7**
(Morocco) Y El Aynaoui	**7^{7}**	4	5
Q	(Thailand) P Srichaphan	2	1
(Argentina) **G Cañas**	**6**	**6**
16	(Spain) C Moyá	5	5
(Chile) **M Ríos**	**7**	**7**
(Romania) A Pavel	3	6^{4}
2	(Russia) **M Safin**	**6**	**7^{7}**

Third round
5	(Russia) Y Kafelnikov	2	2
(Argentina) **G Cañas**	**6**	**6**
(Chile) M Ríos	**6**	3	6^{3}
2	(Russia) **M Safin**	3	**6**	**7^{7}**

Quarterfinals
(Argentina) **G Cañas**	**7**	**6**
2	(Russia) M Safin	5	3
