= 2002 Italian Open – Women's singles =

Women's singles
- 2002 Italian Open

Final
- Champion: (United States) Serena Williams
- Runner-up: (Belgium) Justine Henin
- Score: 7–6^{(8–6)}, 6–4

Details
- Draw: 56 (4WC/12Q/2LL)
- Seeds: 16

Events
| Singles | men | women |
| Doubles | men | women |
| ← 2001 · | Italian Open | · 2003 → |

Serena Williams defeated Justine Henin in the final, 7–6^{(8–6)}, 6–4 to win the women's singles tennis title at the 2002 Italian Open. It was her third title of the season (and the 14th of her career), and her first clay court title.

Jelena Dokic was the defending champion, but lost in third round to Anastasia Myskina.

== Seeds ==
The first eight seeds received a bye into the second round.

1. (United States) ~~Venus Williams~~ (withdrew due to a wrist injury)
2. (United States) Jennifer Capriati (semifinals)
3. (Belgium) Kim Clijsters (semifinals)
4. (United States) Serena Williams (champion)
5. (Belgium) Justine Henin (final)
6. (Federal Republic of Yugoslavia) Jelena Dokic (third round)
7. (France) Amélie Mauresmo (quarterfinals)
8. (France) Sandrine Testud (quarterfinals)
9. (Italy) Silvia Farina Elia (third round)
10. (United States) Meghann Shaughnessy (first round)
11. (Slovakia) Daniela Hantuchová (first round)
12. (Russia) Elena Dementieva (first round)
13. (Switzerland) Patty Schnyder (second round)
14. (Uzbekistan) Iroda Tulyaganova (second round)
15. (Thailand) Tamarine Tanasugarn (first round)
16. (Russia) Tatiana Panova (third round)

== Draw ==
=== Key ===
- Q = Qualifier
- WC = Wild card
- LL = Lucky loser
- Alt = Alternate
- ITF = ITF entry
- PR = Protected ranking
- SR = Special ranking
- SE = Special exempt
- JE = Junior exempt
- JR = Junior Accelerator Programme entrant
- CO = College Accelerator Programme entrant
- NG = Next Gen Accelerator Program entrant
- w/o = Walkover
- r = Retired
- d = Defaulted

=== Finals ===
Quarterfinals
Q | (Spain) Virginia Ruano Pascual | 3 | 4
5 | (Belgium) Justine Henin | 6 | 6
3 | (Belgium) Kim Clijsters | 6 | 6
8 | (France) Sandrine Testud | 1 | 3
(Russia) Anastasia Myskina | 3 | 4
4 | (United States) Serena Williams | 6 | 6
7 | (France) Amélie Mauresmo | 2 | 6 | 4
2 | (United States) Jennifer Capriati | 6 | 3 | 6

Semifinals
5 | (Belgium) Justine Henin | 7 | 6
3 | (Belgium) Kim Clijsters | 5 | 2
4 | (United States) Serena Williams | 6 | 3 | 7
2 | (United States) Jennifer Capriati | 2 | 6 | 5

Final
5 | (Belgium) Justine Henin | 6^{6} | 4
4 | (United States) Serena Williams | 7^{8} | 6

=== Top half ===
==== Section 1 ====
First round
Q | (Spain) M Marrero | 3 | 3
WC | (Russia) A Kournikova | 6 | 6
(Spain) Á Montolio | 6^{4} | 3
Q | (Spain) V Ruano Pascual | 7^{7} | 6
WC | (Italy) T Garbin | 3 | 2
14 | (Uzbekistan) I Tulyaganova | 6 | 6
10 | (United States) M Shaughnessy | 3 | 3
Q | (Sweden) Å Svensson | 6 | 6
(Argentina) P Suárez | 3 | 1
(Luxembourg) A Kremer | 6 | 6
(Italy) F Schiavone | 4 | 6 | 6
(Colombia) F Zuluaga | 6 | 1 | 4

Second round
LL | (United States) L Osterloh | 1 | 6 | 1
WC | (Russia) A Kournikova | 6 | 4 | 6
Q | (Spain) V Ruano Pascual | 6 | 3 | 7^{7}
14 | (Uzbekistan) I Tulyaganova | 2 | 6 | 6^{2}
Q | (Sweden) Å Svensson | 1 | 0
(Luxembourg) A Kremer | 6 | 6
(Italy) F Schiavone | 6^{5} | 2
5 | (Belgium) J Henin | 7^{7} | 6

Third round
WC | (Russia) A Kournikova | 3 | 2
Q | (Spain) V Ruano Pascual | 6 | 6
(Luxembourg) A Kremer | 2 | 4
5 | (Belgium) J Henin | 6 | 6

Quarterfinals
Q | (Spain) V Ruano Pascual | 3 | 4
5 | (Belgium) J Henin | 6 | 6

==== Section 2 ====
First round
(Russia) E Likhovtseva | 7 | 4 | 6
Q | (Zimbabwe) C Black | 5 | 6 | 4
WC | (Italy) An Serra Zanetti | 6 | 4 | 0
(Slovakia) H Nagyová | 1 | 6 | 6
Q | (United States) J Hopkins | 6 | 4 | 0
16 | (Russia) T Panova | 4 | 6 | 6
9 | (Italy) S Farina Elia | 6 | 6
Q | (Belgium) E Callens | 0 | 4
Q | (United States) M Tu | 3 | 5
(Austria) B Schett | 6 | 7
Q | (Ukraine) J Vakulenko | 7 | 6
(Switzerland) E Gagliardi | 5 | 0

Second round
3 | (Belgium) K Clijsters | 6 | 6
(Russia) E Likhovtseva | 3 | 2
(Slovakia) H Nagyová | 0 | 2^{r}
16 | (Russia) T Panova | 6 | 5
9 | (Italy) S Farina Elia | 6 | 6
(Austria) B Schett | 2 | 4
Q | (Ukraine) J Vakulenko | 1 | 1
8 | (France) S Testud | 6 | 6

Third round
3 | (Belgium) K Clijsters | 6 | 6^{6} | 6
16 | (Russia) T Panova | 3 | 7^{8} | 1
9 | (Italy) S Farina Elia | 6 | 2 | 3
8 | (France) S Testud | 3 | 6 | 6

Quarterfinals
3 | (Belgium) K Clijsters | 6 | 6
8 | (France) S Testud | 1 | 3

=== Bottom half ===
==== Section 3 ====
First round
(Israel) A Smashnova | 6 | 6
(Italy) Ad Serra Zanetti | 1 | 2
(Spain) M Serna | 6 | 6
WC | (Italy) ME Camerin | 3 | 4
(Russia) A Myskina | 6 | 6
11 | (Slovakia) D Hantuchová | 4 | 4
15 | (Thailand) T Tanasugarn | 0 | 2
Q | (Czech Republic) D Chládková | 6 | 6
(Spain) G León García | 6 | 1 | 6^{4}
(Spain) C Martínez | 0 | 6 | 7^{7}
Q | (Czech Republic) K Koukalová | 6 | 4 | 1
(Italy) R Grande | 2 | 6 | 6

Second round
6 | (Federal Republic of Yugoslavia) J Dokic | 6 | 3 | 6
(Israel) A Smashnova | 3 | 6 | 1
(Spain) M Serna | 2 | 7^{7} | 2
(Russia) A Myskina | 6 | 6^{4} | 6
Q | (Czech Republic) D Chládková | 6 | 4 | 7
(Spain) C Martínez | 4 | 6 | 5
(Italy) R Grande | 0 | 3
4 | (United States) S Williams | 6 | 6

Third round
6 | (Federal Republic of Yugoslavia) J Dokic | 7 | 4 | 3
(Russia) A Myskina | 5 | 6 | 6
Q | (Czech Republic) D Chládková | 1 | 2
4 | (United States) S Williams | 6 | 6

Quarterfinals
(Russia) A Myskina | 3 | 4
4 | (United States) S Williams | 6 | 6

==== Section 4 ====
First round
(Spain) C Torrens Valero | 3 | 4
(France) N Dechy | 6 | 6
(Slovakia) M Suchá | 0 | 6^{4}
(Bulgaria) M Maleeva | 6 | 7^{7}
(Japan) A Sugiyama | 6 | 7
12 | (Russia) E Dementieva | 4 | 5
13 | (Switzerland) P Schnyder | 6 | 6
(Slovakia) J Husárová | 2 | 3
(France) M Pierce | 6 | 5 | 6
Q | (Switzerland) M-G Mikaelian | 3 | 7 | 4
Q | (Argentina) C Fernández | 6 | 1 | 6^{7}
LL | (Slovenia) M Matevžič | 4 | 6 | 7^{9}

Second round
7 | (France) A Mauresmo | 6 | 7
(France) N Dechy | 1 | 5
(Bulgaria) M Maleeva | 6^{3} | 5
(Japan) A Sugiyama | 7^{7} | 7
13 | (Switzerland) P Schnyder | 3 | 6 | 2
(France) M Pierce | 6 | 1 | 6
LL | (Slovenia) M Matevžič | 2 | 1
2 | (United States) J Capriati | 6 | 6

Third round
7 | (France) A Mauresmo | 6 | 6
(Japan) A Sugiyama | 0 | 2
(France) M Pierce | 0 | 0
2 | (United States) J Capriati | 6 | 6

Quarterfinals
7 | (France) A Mauresmo | 2 | 6 | 4
2 | (United States) J Capriati | 6 | 3 | 6

== Qualifying ==
=== Seeds ===
1. (Slovenia) Katarina Srebotnik (first round)
2. (Zimbabwe) Cara Black (qualified)
3. (United States) Meilen Tu (qualified)
4. (Paraguay) Rossana de los Ríos (first round)
5. (Sweden) Åsa Svensson (qualified)
6. (Slovenia) Maja Matevžič (qualifying competition, lucky loser)
7. (United States) Lilia Osterloh (qualifying competition, lucky loser)
8. (Switzerland) Marie-Gaïané Mikaelian (qualified)
9. (Belarus) Tatiana Poutchek (qualifying competition)
10. (United States) Chanda Rubin (first round)
11. (Spain) Marta Marrero (qualified)
12. (United States) Jennifer Hopkins (qualified)
13. (Russia) Alina Jidkova (qualifying competition)
14. (Spain) Virginia Ruano Pascual (qualified)
15. (United States) Samantha Reeves (qualifying competition)
16. (Denmark) Eva Dyrberg (qualifying competition)
17. (Czech Republic) Denisa Chládková (qualified)
18. (Netherlands) Miriam Oremans (first round)
19. (United States) Jill Craybas (qualifying competition)
20. (Spain) Eva Bes (first round)
21. (Germany) Jana Kandarr (first round)
22. (Kazakhstan) Irina Selyutina (first round)
23. (Argentina) Mariana Díaz Oliva (qualifying competition)
24. (Argentina) Clarisa Fernández (qualified)

=== Qualifiers ===
1. (Belgium) Els Callens
2. (Zimbabwe) Cara Black
3. (United States) Meilen Tu
4. (Ukraine) Julia Vakulenko
5. (Sweden) Åsa Svensson
6. (Czech Republic) Klára Koukalová
7. (Spain) Virginia Ruano Pascual
8. (Switzerland) Marie-Gaïané Mikaelian
9. (Czech Republic) Denisa Chládková
10. (Argentina) Clarisa Fernández
11. (Spain) Marta Marrero
12. (United States) Jennifer Hopkins

=== Lucky losers ===
1. (Slovenia) Maja Matevžič
2. (United States) Lilia Osterloh

=== Qualifying draw ===
==== First qualifier ====
| First round | | | | | Qualifying competition |
| 1 | (Slovenia) Katarina Srebotnik | 5 | 7 | 1 |
| | (Belgium) Els Callens | 7 | 5 | 6 | | (Belgium) Els Callens | 5 | 6 | 6 |
| | (South Africa) Liezel Huber | 5 | 5 | | 23 | (Argentina) Mariana Díaz Oliva | 7 | 3 | 3 |
| 23 | (Argentina) Mariana Díaz Oliva | 7 | 7 |

==== Second qualifier ====
| First round | | | | Qualifying competition |
| 2 | (Zimbabwe) Cara Black | 6 | 6 |
| WC | (Italy) Silvia Disderi | 1 | 1 | 2 | (Zimbabwe) Cara Black | 6 | 6 |
| | (United States) Brie Rippner | 6 | 6 | | (United States) Brie Rippner | 4 | 2 |
| 18 | (Netherlands) Miriam Oremans | 0 | 2 |

==== Third qualifier ====
| First round | | | | Qualifying competition |
| 3 | (United States) Meilen Tu | 7 | 6 |
| | (Italy) Gloria Pizzichini | 5 | 1 | 3 | (United States) Meilen Tu | 6 | 6 |
| WC | (Italy) Laura Dell'Angelo | 1 | 1 | 19 | (United States) Jill Craybas | 2 | 0 |
| 19 | (United States) Jill Craybas | 6 | 6 |

==== Fourth qualifier ====
| First round | | | | Qualifying competition |
| 4 | (Paraguay) Rossana de los Ríos | 4 | 3 |
| | (Ukraine) Julia Vakulenko | 6 | 6 | | (Ukraine) Julia Vakulenko | 6 | 0 | 6 |
| | (Japan) Rika Fujiwara | 0 | 5 | 16 | (Denmark) Eva Dyrberg | 4 | 6 | 0 |
| 16 | (Denmark) Eva Dyrberg | 6 | 7 |

==== Fifth qualifier ====
| First round | | | | Qualifying competition |
| 5 | (Sweden) Åsa Svensson | 6 | 6 |
| | (Spain) María José Martínez Sánchez | 2 | 3 | 5 | (Sweden) Åsa Svensson | 2 | 6 | 7 |
| | (Czech Republic) Libuše Průšová | 6 | 6 | | (Czech Republic) Libuše Průšová | 6 | 3 | 5 |
| 22 | (Kazakhstan) Irina Selyutina | 4 | 3 |

==== Sixth qualifier ====
| First round | | | | | Qualifying competition |
| 6 | (Slovenia) Maja Matevžič | 3 | 6 | 6 |
| | (Argentina) María Emilia Salerni | 6 | 4 | 4 | 6 | (Slovenia) Maja Matevžič | 1 | 3 |
| | (Czech Republic) Klára Koukalová | 2 | 6 | 6 | | (Czech Republic) Klára Koukalová | 6 | 6 |
| 20 | (Spain) Eva Bes | 6 | 4 | 4 |

==== Seventh qualifier ====
| First round | | | | | Qualifying competition |
| 7 | (United States) Lilia Osterloh | 6 | 4 | 6 |
| WC | (Estonia) Maret Ani | 3 | 6 | 4 | 7 | (United States) Lilia Osterloh | 1 | 2 |
| | (Canada) Maureen Drake | 4 | 6 | 0 | 14 | (Spain) Virginia Ruano Pascual | 6 | 6 |
| 14 | (Spain) Virginia Ruano Pascual | 6 | 3 | 6 |

==== Eighth qualifier ====
| First round | | | | Qualifying competition |
| 8 | (Switzerland) Marie-Gaïané Mikaelian | 6 | 6 |
| WC | (Italy) Elisa Balsamo | 2 | 0 | 8 | (Switzerland) Marie-Gaïané Mikaelian | 6^{3} | 6 | 6 |
| | (Canada) Jana Nejedly | 2 | 4 | 15 | (United States) Samantha Reeves | 7^{7} | 3 | 2 |
| 15 | (United States) Samantha Reeves | 6 | 6 |

==== Ninth qualifier ====
| First round | | | | Qualifying competition |
| 9 | (Belarus) Tatiana Poutchek | 6 | 6 |
| | (Italy) Roberta Vinci | 3 | 4 | 9 | (Belarus) Tatiana Poutchek | 7 | 2 | 0 |
| | (Colombia) Catalina Castaño | 6^{3} | 3 | 17 | (Czech Republic) Denisa Chládková | 5 | 6 | 6 |
| 17 | (Czech Republic) Denisa Chládková | 7^{7} | 6 |

==== Tenth qualifier ====
| First round | | | | Qualifying competition |
| 10 | (United States) Chanda Rubin | 3 | 4 |
| | (Italy) Nathalie Viérin | 6 | 6 | | (Italy) Nathalie Viérin | 6^{3} | 4 |
| | (France) Alexandra Fusai | 4 | 4 | 24 | (Argentina) Clarisa Fernández | 7^{7} | 6 |
| 24 | (Argentina) Clarisa Fernández | 6 | 6 |

==== Eleventh qualifier ====
| First round | | | | | Qualifying competition |
| 11 | (Spain) Marta Marrero | 6 | 6 |
| | (Italy) Valentina Sassi | 1 | 1 | | 11 | (Spain) Marta Marrero | 6 | 6 |
| | (Ukraine) Elena Tatarkova | 6 | 6^{3} | 7 | | (Ukraine) Elena Tatarkova | 1 | 4 |
| 21 | (Germany) Jana Kandarr | 2 | 7^{7} | 5 |

==== Twelfth qualifier ====
| First round | | | | | Qualifying competition |
| 12 | (United States) Jennifer Hopkins | 6 | 6 |
| WC | (Italy) Elena Vianello | 1 | 2 | | 12 | (United States) Jennifer Hopkins | 7^{7} | 1 | 6 |
| WC | (Romania) Raluca Sandu | 6 | 4 | 1 | 13 | (Russia) Alina Jidkova | 6^{5} | 6 | 4 |
| 13 | (Russia) Alina Jidkova | 4 | 6 | 6 |
