= 2002 Italian Open – Men's doubles =

Men's doubles
- 2002 Italian Open

Final
- Champions: (Czech Republic) Martin Damm (Czech Republic) Cyril Suk
- Runners-up: (Zimbabwe) Wayne Black (Zimbabwe) Kevin Ullyett
- Score: 7–5, 7–5

Events
Singles	men	women
Doubles	men	women
← 2001 ·	Italian Open	· 2003 →

Wayne Ferreira and Yevgeny Kafelnikov were the defending champions but lost in the second round to Wayne Black and Kevin Ullyett.

Martin Damm and Cyril Suk won in the final 7–5, 7–5 against Black and Ullyett.

== Seeds ==
Champion seeds are indicated in bold text while text in italics indicates the round in which those seeds were eliminated.

1. (United States) Donald Johnson / (United States) Jared Palmer (quarterfinals)
2. (The Bahamas) Mark Knowles / (Canada) Daniel Nestor (quarterfinals)
3. (India) Mahesh Bhupathi / (Belarus) Max Mirnyi (quarterfinals)
4. (Czech Republic) Jiří Novák / (Czech Republic) David Rikl (first round)
5. (Zimbabwe) Wayne Black / (Zimbabwe) Kevin Ullyett (final)
6. (United States) Bob Bryan / (United States) Mike Bryan (first round)
7. (Australia) Joshua Eagle / (Australia) Sandon Stolle (semifinals)
8. (Czech Republic) Petr Pála / (Czech Republic) Pavel Vízner (second round)

== Draw ==
=== Key ===
- Q = Qualifier
- WC = Wild card
- LL = Lucky loser
- Alt = Alternate
- SE = Special exempt
- PR = Protected ranking
- ITF = ITF entry
- JE = Junior exempt
- w/o = Walkover
- r = Retired
- d = Defaulted
- SR = Special ranking

=== Final ===
Final
5	(Zimbabwe) Wayne Black (Zimbabwe) Kevin Ullyett	5	5
	(Czech Republic) **Martin Damm** (Czech Republic) **Cyril Suk**	**7**	**7**

=== Top half ===
First round
1	(United States) **D Johnson** (United States) **J Palmer**	**6**	**6**
(Morocco) Y El Aynaoui (Spain) A Portas	1	4
(Sweden) **T Johansson** (Australia) **M Philippoussis**	**7**	4	**[10]**
(South Africa) R Koenig (Japan) T Shimada	5	**6**	[6]
(Germany) K Braasch (Russia) A Olhovskiy	4	2
(France) **M Llodra** (France) **F Santoro**	**6**	**6**
(South Africa) D Adams (Sweden) S Aspelin	3	**7^{7}**	[6]
7	(Australia) **J Eagle** (Australia) **S Stolle**	**6**	6^{3}	**[10]**
3	(India) **M Bhupathi** (Belarus) **M Mirnyi**	**6**	4	**[10]**
(South Africa) M Barnard (South Africa) C Haggard	4	**6**	[6]
(Argentina) **L Arnold** (Argentina) **G Etlis**	**6**	**6**
(Argentina) G Cañas (Russia) M Safin	0	2
(South Africa) **W Ferreira** (Russia) **Y Kafelnikov**	**6**	**6**
(Czech Republic) L Friedl (Australia) P Hanley	4	3
(South Africa) J-L de Jager (India) L Paes	4	2
5	(Zimbabwe) **W Black** (Zimbabwe) **K Ullyett**	**6**	**6**

Second round
1	(United States) **D Johnson** (United States) **J Palmer**	w/o
(Sweden) T Johansson (Australia) M Philippoussis
(France) M Llodra (France) F Santoro	3	5
7	(Australia) **J Eagle** (Australia) **S Stolle**	**6**	**7**
3	(India) **M Bhupathi** (Belarus) **M Mirnyi**	**7^{7}**	**6**
(Argentina) L Arnold (Argentina) G Etlis	6^{2}	4
(South Africa) W Ferreira (Russia) Y Kafelnikov	5	**6**	[2]
5	(Zimbabwe) **W Black** (Zimbabwe) **K Ullyett**	**7**	3	**[10]**

Quarterfinals
1	(United States) D Johnson (United States) J Palmer	6^{2}	**6**	[9]
7	(Australia) **J Eagle** (Australia) **S Stolle**	**7^{7}**	3	**[11]**
3	(India) M Bhupathi (Belarus) M Mirnyi	**6**	4	[3]
5	(Zimbabwe) **W Black** (Zimbabwe) **K Ullyett**	4	**6**	**[10]**

Semifinals
7	(Australia) J Eagle (Australia) S Stolle	4	3
5	(Zimbabwe) **W Black** (Zimbabwe) **K Ullyett**	**6**	**6**

=== Bottom half ===
First round
6	(United States) B Bryan (United States) M Bryan	3	4
(Switzerland) **R Federer** (United Kingdom) **T Henman**	**6**	**6**
(United States) **R Leach** (United States) **B MacPhie**	**6**	**6**
(France) J Boutter (Netherlands) S Schalken	3	4
WC	(Italy) **M Bertolini** (Italy) **C Brandi**	**6**	4	**[10]**
WC	(Italy) G Galimberti (Italy) M Navarra	2	**6**	[8]
(Czech Republic) **T Cibulec** (Czech Republic) **R Štěpánek**	6^{6}	**7^{8}**	**[12]**
4	(Czech Republic) J Novák (Czech Republic) D Rikl	**7^{8}**	6^{6}	[10]
8	(Czech Republic) **P Pála** (Czech Republic) **P Vízner**	**6**	**6**
(France) S Grosjean (Croatia) I Ljubičić	4	3
(Czech Republic) **M Damm** (Czech Republic) **C Suk**	**6**	**6**
WC	(Italy) A Gaudenzi (Italy) D Sanguinetti	3	2
(Australia) A Florent (United States) J Tarango	4	**6**	[8]
(Australia) **M Hill** (Czech Republic) **D Vacek**	**6**	4	**[10]**
(Spain) J C Ferrero (Spain) T Robredo	**6**	6^{2}	[9]
2	(The Bahamas) **M Knowles** (Canada) **D Nestor**	4	**7^{7}**	**[11]**

Second round
(Switzerland) R Federer (United Kingdom) T Henman	3	1
(United States) **R Leach** (United States) **B MacPhie**	**6**	**6**
WC	(Italy) M Bertolini (Italy) C Brandi	3	3
(Czech Republic) **T Cibulec** (Czech Republic) **R Štěpánek**	**6**	**6**
8	(Czech Republic) P Pála (Czech Republic) P Vízner	4	1
(Czech Republic) **M Damm** (Czech Republic) **C Suk**	**6**	**6**
(Australia) M Hill (Czech Republic) D Vacek	6^{4}	6^{2}
2	(The Bahamas) **M Knowles** (Canada) **D Nestor**	**7^{7}**	**7^{7}**

Quarterfinals
(United States) R Leach (United States) B MacPhie	6^{10}	2
(Czech Republic) **T Cibulec** (Czech Republic) **R Štěpánek**	**7^{12}**	**6**
(Czech Republic) **M Damm** (Czech Republic) **C Suk**	**7^{8}**	**6**
2	(The Bahamas) M Knowles (Canada) D Nestor	6^{6}	4

Semifinals
(Czech Republic) T Cibulec (Czech Republic) R Štěpánek	6^{2}	3
(Czech Republic) **M Damm** (Czech Republic) **C Suk**	**7^{7}**	**6**
