= 2002 Rogers AT&T Cup – Doubles =

Doubles
- 2002 Canada Masters and the Rogers AT&T Cup

Final
- Champions: (Spain) Virginia Ruano Pascual (Argentina) Paola Suárez
- Runners-up: (Japan) Rika Fujiwara (Japan) Ai Sugiyama
- Score: 6–4, 7–6^{(7–4)}

Details
- Draw: 28
- Seeds: 8

Events
Singles	men	women
Doubles	men	women
- Canada Masters Rogers AT&T Cup

Kimberly Po-Messerli and Nicole Pratt were the defending champions. They were both present but did not compete together.
Po-Messerli partnered with Corina Morariu, but lost in the quarterfinals to Virginia Ruano Pascual and Paola Suárez.
Pratt partnered with Alicia Molik, but withdrew before their second round match against Elena Dementieva and Janette Husárová.

Virginia Ruano Pascual and Paola Suárez won in the final 6–4, 7–6^{(7–4)}, against Rika Fujiwara and Ai Sugiyama.

== Seeds ==
The top four seeds received a bye into the second round.

1. (United States) Lisa Raymond / (Australia) Rennae Stubbs (second round)
2. (Spain) Virginia Ruano Pascual / (Argentina) Paola Suárez (champions)
3. (Zimbabwe) Cara Black / (Russia) Elena Likhovtseva (second round)
4. (Slovakia) Daniela Hantuchová / (Spain) Arantxa Sánchez Vicario (quarterfinals)
5. (Russia) Elena Dementieva / (Slovakia) Janette Husárová (semifinals)
6. (Russia) Anna Kournikova / (Austria) Barbara Schett (first round)
7. (Belgium) Els Callens / (Italy) Roberta Vinci (second round)
8. (United States) Nicole Arendt / (South Africa) Liezel Huber (semifinals)

== Draw ==
Key

- Q = Qualifier
- WC = Wild card
- LL = Lucky loser
- Alt = Alternate
- ITF = ITF entry
- PR = Protected ranking
- SR = Special ranking
- SE = Special exempt
- JE = Junior exempt
- JR = Junior Accelerator Programme entrant
- CO = College Accelerator Programme entrant
- NG = Next Gen Accelerator Program entrant
- w/o = Walkover
- r = Retired
- d = Defaulted

=== Finals ===
Semifinals
5	(Russia) Elena Dementieva (Slovakia) Janette Husárová	6	4	3
(Japan) Rika Fujiwara (Japan) Ai Sugiyama	1	6	6
8	(United States) Nicole Arendt (South Africa) Liezel Huber	6^{3}	3
2	(Spain) Virginia Ruano Pascual (Argentina) Paola Suárez	7	6

Final
(Japan) Rika Fujiwara (Japan) Ai Sugiyama	4	6^{4}
2	(Spain) Virginia Ruano Pascual (Argentina) Paola Suárez	6	7

=== Top half ===
First round
(Belgium) K Clijsters (Serbia and Montenegro) J Dokić	6	6
(Chinese Taipei) J Lee (Indonesia) W Prakusya	3	3
(Australia) A Molik (Australia) N Pratt	7	5	6
(Italy) S Farina Elia (Spain) M Serna	6^{2}	7	2
(France) A Fusai (Netherlands) C Vis	2	0
5	(Russia) E Dementieva (Slovakia) J Husárová	6	6
(Slovenia) T Križan (Slovenia) K Srebotnik	6	4	4
WC	(United States) J Capriati (United States) M Navratilova	4	6	6
(Belgium) J Henin (France) M Pierce	5	3
(France) N Dechy (United States) M Tu	7	6
(Japan) R Fujiwara (Japan) A Sugiyama	1	6	6
6	(Russia) A Kournikova (Austria) B Schett	6	4	4

Second round
1	(United States) L Raymond (Australia) R Stubbs	6	2	3
(Belgium) K Clijsters (Serbia and Montenegro) J Dokić	4	6	6
(Australia) A Molik (Australia) N Pratt
5	(Russia) E Dementieva (Slovakia) J Husárová	w/o
4	(Slovakia) D Hantuchová (Spain) A Sánchez Vicario	6	6
(United States) J Capriati (United States) M Navratilova	4	3
(France) N Dechy (United States) M Tu	4	5
(Japan) R Fujiwara (Japan) A Sugiyama	6	7

Quarterfinals
(Belgium) K Clijsters (Serbia and Montenegro) J Dokić	7	5	6^{0}
5	(Russia) E Dementieva (Slovakia) J Husárová	6^{6}	7	7
4	(Slovakia) D Hantuchová (Spain) A Sánchez Vicario	4	1
(Japan) R Fujiwara (Japan) A Sugiyama	6	6

Semifinals
5	(Russia) E Dementieva (Slovakia) J Husárová	6	4	3
(Japan) R Fujiwara (Japan) A Sugiyama	1	6	6

=== Bottom half ===
First round
8	(United States) N Arendt (South Africa) L Huber	6	3	6
(Russia) T Panova (Uzbekistan) I Tulyaganova	2	6	3
(Argentina) L Montalvo (Ukraine) E Tatarkova	6	6
WC	(Canada) S Jeyaseelan (Canada) V Webb	2	1
(United States) C Rubin (Belarus) N Zvereva	6	6
(Czech Republic) D Bedáňová (Russia) E Bovina	1	1
7	(Belgium) E Callens (Italy) R Vinci	6	6
WC	(Canada) R Kolbovic (Canada) M-È Pelletier	2	4
(Italy) R Grande (Switzerland) P Schnyder	2	1
(United States) C Morariu (United States) K Po-Messerli	6	6
Q	(Australia) C Barclay (France) É Loit	6	6
(South Africa) A Coetzer (United States) L McNeil	3	2

Second round
8	(United States) N Arendt (South Africa) L Huber	6	4	6
(Argentina) L Montalvo (Ukraine) E Tatarkova	4	6	4
(United States) C Rubin (Belarus) N Zvereva	6	6
3	(Zimbabwe) C Black (Russia) E Likhovtseva	2	2
7	(Belgium) E Callens (Italy) R Vinci	2	6	2
(United States) C Morariu (United States) K Po-Messerli	6	3	6
Q	(Australia) C Barclay (France) É Loit	6	1	1
2	(Spain) V Ruano Pascual (Argentina) P Suárez	1	6	6

Quarterfinals
8	(United States) N Arendt (South Africa) L Huber	7	6
(United States) C Rubin (Belarus) N Zvereva	5	3
(United States) C Morariu (United States) K Po-Messerli	5	1
2	(Spain) V Ruano Pascual (Argentina) P Suárez	7	6

Semifinals
8	(United States) N Arendt (South Africa) L Huber	6^{3}	3
2	(Spain) V Ruano Pascual (Argentina) P Suárez	7	6
