= 2002 Italian Open (tennis) =

- Date: 6–12 May (men); 13–19 May (women)
- Edition: 59th
- Surface: Clay / outdoor
- Location: Rome, Italy
- Venue: Foro Italico

Champions

Men's singles
- (United States) Andre Agassi

Women's singles
- (United States) Serena Williams

Men's doubles
- (Czech Republic) Martin Damm / (Czech Republic) Cyril Suk

Women's doubles
- (Spain) Virginia Ruano Pascual / (Argentina) Paola Suárez
← 2001 ·	Italian Open	· 2003 →

The 2002 Italian Open (also known as 2002 Rome Masters) was a tennis tournament played on outdoor clay courts. It was the 59th edition of the Italian Open and was part of the Tennis Masters Series of the 2002 ATP Tour and of Tier I of the 2002 WTA Tour. Both the men's and women's events took place at the Foro Italico in Rome in Italy. The men's tournament was played from May 6 through May 12, 2002 while the women's tournament was played from 13 May through 19 May 2002.

== Finals ==
=== Men's singles ===
(United States) Andre Agassi defeated (Germany) Tommy Haas 6–3, 6–3, 6–0

- It was Agassi's 3rd title of the year and the 53rd of his career. It was his 2nd Masters title of the year and his 14th overall.

=== Women's singles ===
(United States) Serena Williams defeated (Belgium) Justine Henin-Hardenne 7–6^{(8–6)}, 6–4

- It was Williams' 3rd title of the year and the 14th of her career. It was her 2nd Tier I title of the year and her 5th overall.

=== Men's doubles ===
(Czech Republic) Martin Damm / (Czech Republic) Cyril Suk defeated (Zimbabwe) Wayne Black / (Zimbabwe) Kevin Ullyett 7–5, 7–5

- It was Damm's 2nd title of the year and the 22nd of his career. It was Suk's 2nd title of the year and the 24th of his career.

=== Women's doubles ===
(Spain) Virginia Ruano Pascual / (Argentina) Paola Suárez defeated (Spain) Conchita Martínez / (Argentina) Patricia Tarabini 6–3, 6–4

- It was Ruano Pascual's 3rd title of the year and the 16th of her career. It was Suárez's 3rd title of the year and the 23rd of her career.
