= 2002 Family Circle Cup – Singles =

Singles
- 2002 Family Circle Cup

Final
- Champion: (Croatia) Iva Majoli
- Runner-up: (Switzerland) Patty Schnyder
- Score: 7–6^{(7–5)}, 6–4

Details
- Draw: 56
- Seeds: 16

Events
Singles	Doubles
← 2001 ·	Family Circle Cup	· 2003 →

Iva Majoli defeated Patty Schnyder in the final, 7–6^{(7–5)}, 6–4 to win the singles tennis title at the 2002 Family Circle Cup. It was her first title since the 1997 French Open, and the eighth and last title of her career.

Jennifer Capriati was the defending champion, but lost in semifinals to Schnyder.

== Seeds ==
The first nine seeds received a bye into the second round.

1. (United States) Jennifer Capriati (semifinals)
2. (United States) Monica Seles (third round)
3. (United States) Serena Williams (quarterfinals)
4. (Federal Republic of Yugoslavia) Jelena Dokic (second round)
5. (Belgium) ~~Justine Henin~~ (withdrew)
6. (France) Amélie Mauresmo (second round)
7. (France) Sandrine Testud (semifinals)
8. (United States) Meghann Shaughnessy (second round)
9. (Italy) Silvia Farina Elia (second round)
10. (Spain) Arantxa Sánchez Vicario (second round)
11. (Slovakia) Daniela Hantuchová (second round)
12. (Russia) Elena Dementieva (second round)
13. (South Africa) Amanda Coetzer (quarterfinals)
14. (United States) Lisa Raymond (first round)
15. (Russia) Tatiana Panova (first round)
16. (United States) ~~Alexandra Stevenson~~ (withdrew)
17. (Italy) Francesca Schiavone (first round)

== Draw ==
=== Key ===
- Q = Qualifier
- WC = Wild card
- LL = Lucky loser
- Alt = Alternate
- SE = Special exempt
- PR = Protected ranking
- ITF = ITF entry
- JE = Junior exempt
- w/o = Walkover
- r = Retired
- d = Defaulted
- SR = Special ranking

=== Finals ===
Quarterfinals
1	(United States) Jennifer Capriati	6	7
(Russia) Anastasia Myskina	0	5
3	(United States) Serena Williams	6	4	5
(Switzerland) Patty Schnyder	2	6	7
13	(South Africa) Amanda Coetzer	4	5
(Croatia) Iva Majoli	6	7
7	(France) Sandrine Testud	6^{4}	6	6
Q	(France) Stéphanie Foretz	7^{7}	3	3

Semifinals
1	(United States) Jennifer Capriati	4	3
(Switzerland) Patty Schnyder	6	6
(Croatia) Iva Majoli	6	6
7	(France) Sandrine Testud	2	4

Final
(Switzerland) Patty Schnyder	6^{5}	4
(Croatia) Iva Majoli	7^{7}	6

=== Top half ===
==== Section 1 ====
First round
Q	(United States) S Reeves	6	3	3
(Slovakia) J Husárová	3	6	6
Q	(France) A Fusai	6	6
(Australia) N Pratt	4	1
(United States) M Tu	6	6
15	(Russia) T Panova	3	4
10	(Spain) A Sánchez Vicario	6	6
(Italy) R Grande	4	2
(Spain) G León García	2	3
(Russia) A Myskina	6	6
(Slovakia) H Nagyová	6	4	0
Q	(Argentina) C Fernández	4	6	6

Second round
1	(United States) J Capriati	2	6	6
(Slovakia) J Husárová	6	2	4
Q	(France) A Fusai	6	6
(United States) M Tu	1	1
10	(Spain) A Sánchez Vicario	6^{4}	6^{7}
(Russia) A Myskina	7^{7}	7^{9}
Q	(Argentina) C Fernández	7^{7}	6
9	(Italy) S Farina Elia	6^{4}	0

Third round
1	(United States) J Capriati	6	7
Q	(France) A Fusai	3	5
(Russia) A Myskina	3	6	6
Q	(Argentina) C Fernández	6	4	4

Quarterfinals
1	(United States) J Capriati	6	7
(Russia) A Myskina	0	5

==== Section 2 ====
First round
(Switzerland) E Gagliardi	7^{7}	2	1
(United States) J Hopkins	6^{1}	6	6
Q	(Italy) A Serra Zanetti	3	2
(Russia) E Likhovtseva	6	6
(France) N Dechy	2	6	6
14	(United States) L Raymond	6	2	3
11	(Slovakia) D Hantuchová	4	7^{7}	6
(Paraguay) R Neffa-de los Ríos	6	6^{4}	0
WC	(France) M Pierce	6	6
(Australia) A Molik	3	4
(Spain) V Ruano Pascual	2	3
(Switzerland) P Schnyder	6	6

Second round
3	(United States) S Williams	6	6
(United States) J Hopkins	0	2
(Russia) E Likhovtseva	4	6^{3}
(France) N Dechy	6	7^{7}
11	(Slovakia) D Hantuchová	3	4
WC	(France) M Pierce	6	6
(Switzerland) P Schnyder	6	3	6
6	(France) A Mauresmo	4	6	2

Third round
3	(United States) S Williams	7^{7}	6
(France) N Dechy	6^{3}	3
WC	(France) M Pierce	6^{4}	2
(Switzerland) P Schnyder	7^{7}	6

Quarterfinals
3	(United States) S Williams	6	4	5
(Switzerland) P Schnyder	2	6	7

=== Bottom half ===
==== Section 3 ====
First round
(United States) M Irvin	1	1
(Argentina) P Suárez	6	6
(Spain) M Marrero	1	1
(Italy) Ad Serra Zanetti	6	6
Q	(United States) E deLone	4	2
13	(South Africa) A Coetzer	6	6
17	(Italy) F Schiavone	3	6	5
(Switzerland) MG Mikaelian	6	3	7
(Croatia) I Majoli	7	6
(Germany) B Lamade	5	3
LL	(Germany) G Arn	2	0
(Israel) A Smashnova	6	6

Second round
8	(United States) M Shaughnessy	1	1
(Argentina) P Suárez	6	6
(Italy) Ad Serra Zanetti	5	6	2
13	(South Africa) A Coetzer	7	4	6
(Switzerland) MG Mikaelian	2	4
(Croatia) I Majoli	6	6
(Israel) A Smashnova	6	6
4	(Federal Republic of Yugoslavia) J Dokic	1	3

Third round
(Argentina) P Suárez	6	5	3
13	(South Africa) A Coetzer	3	7	6
(Croatia) I Majoli	6	3	6
(Israel) A Smashnova	1	6	2

Quarterfinals
13	(South Africa) A Coetzer	4	5
(Croatia) I Majoli	6	7

==== Section 4 ====
First round
(Japan) A Sugiyama	3	6	6
(Luxembourg) A Kremer	6	4	4
WC	(United States) L Osterloh	2	0
WC	(United States) J Craybas	6	6
Q	(Japan) R Fujiwara	6^{7}	1
12	(Russia) E Dementieva	7^{9}	6
LL	(Indonesia) W Prakusya	2	0
Q	(France) S Foretz	6	6
(Spain) C Martínez	7^{7}	6
(Russia) A Kournikova	6^{5}	1
(United States) A Frazier	6	6
Q	(Ukraine) J Vakulenko	4	2

Second round
7	(France) S Testud	7	4	7^{7}
(Japan) A Sugiyama	5	6	6^{2}
WC	(United States) J Craybas	6	3
12	(Russia) E Dementieva	4	2^{r}
Q	(France) S Foretz	6	6
(Spain) C Martínez	1	2
(United States) A Frazier	6	3	0
2	(United States) M Seles	4	6	6

Third round
7	(France) S Testud	6	6
WC	(United States) J Craybas	3	2
Q	(France) S Foretz	6	7^{8}
2	(United States) M Seles	4	6^{6}

Quarterfinals
7	(France) S Testud	6^{4}	6	6
Q	(France) S Foretz	7^{7}	3	3
