= 2003 Family Circle Cup – Singles =

Singles
- 2003 Family Circle Cup

Final
- Champion: (Belgium) Justine Henin-Hardenne
- Runner-up: (United States) Serena Williams
- Score: 6–3, 6–4

Details
- Draw: 56
- Seeds: 16

Events
Singles	Doubles
← 2002 ·	Family Circle Cup	· 2004 →

Justine Henin-Hardenne defeated Serena Williams in the final, 6–3, 6–4 to win the singles tennis title at the 2003 Family Circle Cup. It was her second title of the year, and the eighth of her career.

Iva Majoli was the defending champion, but lost in second round to Elena Dementieva.

== Seeds ==
The first nine seeds received a bye into the second round.

1. (United States) Serena Williams (final)
2. (Belgium) Justine Henin-Hardenne (champion)
3. (United States) Lindsay Davenport (semifinal)
4. (United States) ~~Jennifer Capriati~~ (withdrew due to a strep throat)
5. (Slovakia) Daniela Hantuchová (quarterfinals)
6. (Federal Republic of Yugoslavia) Jelena Dokic (quarterfinals)
7. (Russia) Anastasia Myskina (second round)
8. (Switzerland) Patty Schnyder (second round)
9. (Russia) Elena Bovina (second round)
10. (South Africa) Amanda Coetzer (third round)
11. (United States) Meghann Shaughnessy (third round)
12. (Israel) Anna Pistolesi (second round)
13. (Russia) Elena Dementieva (third round)
14. (France) Nathalie Dechy (third round)
15. (Spain) Conchita Martínez (third round)
16. (Argentina) Clarisa Fernández (third round)
17. (United States) Alexandra Stevenson (first round)

== Draw ==
=== Key ===
- Q = Qualifier
- WC = Wild card
- LL = Lucky loser
- Alt = Alternate
- SE = Special exempt
- PR = Protected ranking
- ITF = ITF entry
- JE = Junior exempt
- w/o = Walkover
- r = Retired
- d = Defaulted
- SR = Special ranking

=== Finals ===
Quarterfinals
1	(United States) Serena Williams	6	6
6	(Federal Republic of Yugoslavia) Jelena Dokic	2	2
3	(United States) Lindsay Davenport	7^{7}	6
(Russia) Vera Zvonareva	6^{3}	3
WC	(United States) Ashley Harkleroad	6	6
5	(Slovakia) Daniela Hantuchová	2	1
(France) Mary Pierce	2	3
2	(Belgium) Justine Henin-Hardenne	6	6

Semifinals
1	(United States) Serena Williams	6	7
3	(United States) Lindsay Davenport	1	5
WC	(United States) Ashley Harkleroad	2	1
2	(Belgium) Justine Henin-Hardenne	6	6

Final
1	(United States) Serena Williams	3	4
2	(Belgium) Justine Henin-Hardenne	6	6

=== Top half ===
==== Section 1 ====
First round
(Thailand) T Tanasugarn	1	5
Q	(Madagascar) D Randriantefy	6	7
Q	(France) M Bartoli	3	6	4
LL	(Italy) T Garbin	6	2	6
(Russia) A Kournikova	4	1^{r}
15	(Spain) C Martínez	6	1
13	(Russia) E Dementieva	6	6
(Uzbekistan) I Tulyaganova	2	2
Q	(United States) L Lee-Waters	2	5
(Croatia) I Majoli	6	7
(Slovenia) M Matevžič	6	5	6
Q	(Russia) M Sharapova	4	7	2

Second round
1	(United States) S Williams	6	6
Q	(Madagascar) D Randriantefy	3	0
LL	(Italy) T Garbin	2	4
15	(Spain) C Martínez	6	6
13	(Russia) E Dementieva	3	7	6
(Croatia) I Majoli	6	5	1
(Slovenia) M Matevžič	1	4
6	(Federal Republic of Yugoslavia) J Dokic	6	6

Third round
1	(United States) S Williams	6	6
15	(Spain) C Martínez	2	2
13	(Russia) E Dementieva	6	4	5
6	(Federal Republic of Yugoslavia) J Dokic	4	6	7

Quarterfinals
1	(United States) S Williams	6	6
6	(Federal Republic of Yugoslavia) J Dokic	2	2

==== Section 2 ====
First round
(Zimbabwe) C Black	3	5
(Czech Republic) D Bedáňová	6	7
(South Korea) Y-j Cho	1	1
LL	(Canada) M Drake	6	6
WC	(United States) M Irvin	6	3	3
16	(Argentina) C Fernández	4	6	6
12	(Israel) A Pistolesi	6	6
Q	(Belgium) E Callens	3	1
(Austria) B Schett	1	2
(Argentina) P Suárez	6	6
(Russia) V Zvonareva	6	6
WC	(United States) S Taylor	2	4

Second round
3	(United States) L Davenport	6	6
(Czech Republic) D Bedáňová	0	1
LL	(Canada) M Drake	1	4
16	(Argentina) C Fernández	6	6
12	(Israel) A Pistolesi	5	1
(Argentina) P Suárez	7	6
(Russia) V Zvonareva	6	4	6
8	(Switzerland) P Schnyder	2	6	4

Third round
3	(United States) L Davenport	6	6
16	(Argentina) C Fernández	4	4
(Argentina) P Suárez	4	4
(Russia) V Zvonareva	6	6

Quarterfinals
3	(United States) L Davenport	7^{7}	6
(Russia) V Zvonareva	6^{3}	3

=== Bottom half ===
==== Section 3 ====
First round
(France) É Loit	3	4^{r}
WC	(United States) A Harkleroad	6	2
(Russia) E Likhovtseva	1	6	6
(Slovakia) J Husárová	6	4	3
Q	(Venezuela) M Sequera	2	4
11	(United States) M Shaughnessy	6	6
17	(United States) A Stevenson	4	3
(Spain) V Ruano Pascual	6	6
(Russia) L Krasnoroutskaya	2	6^{6}
(United States) J Craybas	6	7^{8}
(Russia) T Panova	7	7
WC	(United States) M Tu	5	5

Second round
9	(Russia) E Bovina	2	2
WC	(United States) A Harkleroad	6	6
(Russia) E Likhovtseva	6^{1}	7^{7}	4
11	(United States) M Shaughnessy	7^{7}	6^{5}	6
(Spain) V Ruano Pascual	6	2	3
(United States) J Craybas	2	6	6
(Russia) T Panova	2	6	3
5	(Slovakia) D Hantuchová	6	4	6

Third round
WC	(United States) A Harkleroad	6	6
11	(United States) M Shaughnessy	2	2
(United States) J Craybas	6^{10}	3
5	(Slovakia) D Hantuchová	7^{12}	6

Quarterfinals
WC	(United States) A Harkleroad	6	6
5	(Slovakia) D Hantuchová	2	1

==== Section 4 ====
First round
(Australia) N Pratt	3	3
(France) M Pierce	6	6
Q	(United States) B Mattek	2	2
(United States) L Granville	6	6
(Czech Republic) D Chládková	6	2	4
10	(South Africa) A Coetzer	3	6	6
14	(France) N Dechy	6	7
(Germany) A Barna	2	5
Q	(United States) S Robinson	1	1
(Switzerland) M-G Mikaelian	6	6
(Slovenia) T Pisnik	6	6
(France) S Foretz	3	4

Second round
7	(Russia) A Myskina	4	6	2
(France) M Pierce	6	1	6
(United States) L Granville	2	6^{4}
10	(South Africa) A Coetzer	6	7^{7}
14	(France) N Dechy	6	6
(Switzerland) M-G Mikaelian	1	4
(Slovenia) T Pisnik	4	6	4
2	(Belgium) J Henin-Hardenne	6	3	6

Third round
(France) M Pierce	6	1	6
10	(South Africa) A Coetzer	3	6	0
14	(France) N Dechy	6	3	2
2	(Belgium) J Henin-Hardenne	2	6	6

Quarterfinals
(France) M Pierce	2	3
2	(Belgium) J Henin-Hardenne	6	6
