= 2002 Family Circle Cup – Doubles =

Doubles
- 2002 Family Circle Cup

Final
- Champions: (United States) Lisa Raymond (Australia) Rennae Stubbs
- Runners-up: (France) Alexandra Fusai (Netherlands) Caroline Vis
- Score: 6–4, 3–6, 7–6^{(7–4)}

Details
- Seeds: 8

Events
Singles	Doubles
← 2001 ·	Family Circle Cup	· 2003 →

Lisa Raymond and Rennae Stubbs were the defending champions and successfully defended their title, defeating Alexandra Fusai and Caroline Vis 6–4, 3–6, 7–6^{(7–4)} in the final. It was the 33rd title for Raymond and the 37th title for Stubbs in their respective careers. It was also the 6th title for the pair in the year.

== Seeds ==
The first four seeds received a bye into the second round.

1. (United States) Lisa Raymond / (Australia) Rennae Stubbs (champions)
2. (Spain) Virginia Ruano Pascual / (Argentina) Paola Suárez (second round)
3. (Slovakia) Daniela Hantuchová / (Spain) Arantxa Sánchez Vicario (semifinals)
4. (Spain) Conchita Martínez / (Argentina) Patricia Tarabini (semifinals)
5. (United States) Nicole Arendt / (South Africa) Liezel Huber (first round)
6. (United States) Kimberly Po-Messerli / (Australia) Nicole Pratt (second round)
7. (Russia) Elena Likhovtseva / (United States) Martina Navratilova (first round)
8. (Japan) Ai Sugiyama / (Ukraine) Elena Tatarkova (first round)

== Draw ==
=== Key ===
- Q = Qualifier
- WC = Wild card
- LL = Lucky loser
- Alt = Alternate
- SE = Special exempt
- PR = Protected ranking
- ITF = ITF entry
- JE = Junior exempt
- w/o = Walkover
- r = Retired
- d = Defaulted
- SR = Special ranking

=== Finals ===
Semifinals
1	(United States) Lisa Raymond (Australia) Rennae Stubbs	6	6
3	(Slovakia) Daniela Hantuchová (Spain) Arantxa Sánchez Vicario	2	2
4	(Spain) Conchita Martínez (Argentina) Patricia Tarabini	6	4	3
(France) Alexandra Fusai (Netherlands) Caroline Vis	3	6	6

Final
1	(United States) Lisa Raymond (Australia) Rennae Stubbs	6	3	7^{7}
(France) Alexandra Fusai (Netherlands) Caroline Vis	4	6	6^{4}

=== Top half ===
First round
(Argentina) C Fernández (United States) A Frazier	7^{8}	3	6
(Germany) V Henke (Paraguay) R Neffa-de los Ríos	6^{6}	6	4
(France) N Dechy (United States) M Tu	7	4	6
(Germany) B Lamade (United States) S Reeves	5	6	3
(Italy) S Farina Elia (Sweden) Å Svensson	6	6
7	(Russia) E Likhovtseva (United States) M Navratilova	1	4
(United States) M Irvin (United States) A Spears	5	3
(Russia) E Dementieva (Slovakia) J Husárová	7	6
Q	(Italy) Ad Serra Zanetti (Italy) An Serra Zanetti	6	3	6
(Switzerland) E Gagliardi (Spain) M Marrero	2	6	4
(Japan) R Hiraki (Japan) N Miyagi	7	7^{9}
8	(Japan) A Sugiyama (Ukraine) E Tatarkova	5	6^{7}

Second round
1	(United States) L Raymond (Australia) R Stubbs	6	6
(Argentina) C Fernández (United States) A Frazier	3	2
(France) N Dechy (United States) M Tu	2	2
(Italy) S Farina Elia (Sweden) Å Svensson	6	6
3	(Slovakia) D Hantuchová (Spain) A Sánchez Vicario	w/o
(Russia) E Dementieva (Slovakia) J Husárová
Q	(Italy) Ad Serra Zanetti (Italy) An Serra Zanetti	4	6	6
(Japan) R Hiraki (Japan) N Miyagi	6	3	3

Quarterfinals
1	(United States) L Raymond (Australia) R Stubbs	6	6
(Italy) S Farina Elia (Sweden) Å Svensson	3	4
3	(Slovakia) D Hantuchová (Spain) A Sánchez Vicario	6	6
Q	(Italy) Ad Serra Zanetti (Italy) An Serra Zanetti	1	3

Semifinals
1	(United States) L Raymond (Australia) R Stubbs	6	6
3	(Slovakia) D Hantuchová (Spain) A Sánchez Vicario	2	2

=== Bottom half ===
First round
6	(United States) K Po-Messerli (Australia) N Pratt	7^{7}	6
WC	(United States) J Hopkins (Croatia) I Majoli	6^{4}	2
(Argentina) L Montalvo (Argentina) ME Salerni	7^{7}	2	3
(Japan) R Fujiwara (Russia) T Panova	6^{4}	6	6
(Italy) R Grande (Switzerland) P Schnyder	6	6
(United States) E deLone (United States) K Schlukebir	2	2
5	(United States) N Arendt (South Africa) L Huber	3	6^{6}
WC	(Croatia) M Palaveršić (United States) M Seles	6	7^{8}
(France) A Fusai (Netherlands) C Vis	6	4	6
(Australia) A Molik (Slovakia) H Nagyová	4	6	0
WC	(South Africa) A Coetzer (South Africa) J Steck	2	4
(Chinese Taipei) J Lee (Indonesia) W Prakusya	6	6

Second round
6	(United States) K Po-Messerli (Australia) N Pratt	2	3
(Japan) R Fujiwara (Russia) T Panova	6	6
(Italy) R Grande (Switzerland) P Schnyder	4	3
4	(Spain) C Martínez (Argentina) P Tarabini	6	6
WC	(Croatia) M Palaveršić (United States) M Seles
(France) A Fusai (Netherlands) C Vis	w/o
(Chinese Taipei) J Lee (Indonesia) W Prakusya	6	4	7^{7}
2	(Spain) V Ruano Pascual (Argentina) P Suárez	4	6	6^{5}

Quarterfinals
(Japan) R Fujiwara (Russia) T Panova	3	6^{6}
4	(Spain) C Martínez (Argentina) P Tarabini	6	7^{8}
(France) A Fusai (Netherlands) C Vis	6	6
(Chinese Taipei) J Lee (Indonesia) W Prakusya	2	4

Semifinals
4	(Spain) C Martínez (Argentina) P Tarabini	6	4	3
(France) A Fusai (Netherlands) C Vis	3	6	6
