= 2004 Family Circle Cup =

- Date: April 12–18
- Edition: 32nd
- Category: WTA Tier I Event
- Draw: 64S / 32D
- Surface: Clay / outdoor
- Location: Charleston, SC, U.S.
- Venue: Family Circle Tennis Center
- Attendance: 91,410

Champions

Singles
- (United States) Venus Williams

Doubles
- (Spain) Virginia Ruano / (Argentina) Paola Suárez
| ← 2003 · | Family Circle Cup | · 2005 → |

The 2004 Family Circle Cup was a women's tennis tournament and the 32nd edition of the Family Circle Cup. This WTA Tier I Event was held on outdoor clay courts at the Family Circle Tennis Center in Charleston, South Carolina, United States. Fourth-seeded Venus Williams won the singles title.

== Finals ==
=== Singles ===
(United States) Venus Williams defeated (Spain) Conchita Martínez 2–6, 6–2, 6–1

=== Doubles ===
(Spain) Virginia Ruano Pascual / (Argentina) Paola Suárez defeated (United States) Martina Navratilova / (United States) Lisa Raymond 6–4, 6–1
