= 2001 Family Circle Cup =

Women's tennis tournament

- Date: April 16 – April 22
- Edition: 29th
- Category: Tier I
- Draw: 64S / 32D
- Surface: Clay / outdoor
- Location: Charleston, SC, USA
- Venue: Family Circle Tennis Center
- Attendance: 80,625

Champions

Singles
- (United States) Jennifer Capriati

Doubles
- (United States) Lisa Raymond / (Australia) Rennae Stubbs
← 2000 ·	Family Circle Cup	· 2002 →

The 2001 Family Circle Cup was a women's tennis tournament played on outdoor clay courts at the Family Circle Tennis Center in Charleston, South Carolina in the United States and was part of Tier I of the 2001 WTA Tour. It was the 29th edition of the tournament and ran from April 16 through April 22, 2001. Second-seeded Jennifer Capriati won the singles title.

== Finals ==
=== Singles ===
(United States) Jennifer Capriati defeated (Switzerland) Martina Hingis 6–0, 4–6, 6–4

- It was Capriati's 3rd title of the year and the 13th of her career.

=== Doubles ===
(United States) Lisa Raymond / (Australia) Rennae Stubbs defeated (Spain) Virginia Ruano Pascual / (Argentina) Paola Suárez 5–7, 7–6^{(7–5)}, 6–3

- It was Raymond's 3rd title of the year and the 23rd of her career. It was Stubbs' 3rd title of the year and the 27th of her career.
