= 2001 Family Circle Cup – Singles =

Singles
- 2001 Family Circle Cup

Final
- Champion: (United States) Jennifer Capriati
- Runner-up: (Switzerland) Martina Hingis
- Score: 6–0, 4–6, 6–4

Details
- Draw: 56 (8 Q / 3 WC )
- Seeds: 16

Events
Singles	Doubles
← 2000 ·	Family Circle Cup	· 2002 →

Jennifer Capriati defeated Martina Hingis in the final, 6–0, 4–6, 6–4 to win the singles tennis title at the 2001 Family Circle Cup.

Mary Pierce was the defending champion, but lost in the third round to Amy Frazier.

== Seeds ==
A champion seed is indicated in bold text while text in italics indicates the round in which that seed was eliminated. The top eight seeds received a bye to the second round.

1. (Switzerland) Martina Hingis (final)
2. (United States) **Jennifer Capriati (champion)**
3. (Spain) Conchita Martínez (semifinals)
4. (South Africa) Amanda Coetzer (quarterfinals)
5. (Spain) Arantxa Sánchez-Vicario (second round)
6. (France) Mary Pierce (third round)
7. (France) Amélie Mauresmo (quarterfinals)
8. (United States) Chanda Rubin (second round)
9. (Argentina) Paola Suárez (third round)
10. (United States) Amy Frazier (quarterfinals)
11. (United States) Lisa Raymond (third round)
12. (United States) Meghann Shaughnessy (second round)
13. (Federal Republic of Yugoslavia) Jelena Dokić (first round)
14. (Spain) Gala León García (third round)
15. (Slovakia) Henrieta Nagyová (third round)
16. (Italy) Silvia Farina Elia (second round)

== Draw ==
=== Key ===
- Q = Qualifier
- WC = Wild card
- LL = Lucky loser
- Alt = Alternate
- SE = Special exempt
- PR = Protected ranking
- ITF = ITF entry
- JE = Junior exempt
- w/o = Walkover
- r = Retired
- d = Defaulted
- SR = Special ranking

=== Finals ===
Semifinals
1	(Switzerland) **Martina Hingis**	**6**	**6**
3	(Spain) Conchita Martínez	2	2
(Germany) Marlene Weingärtner	0	2
2	(United States) **Jennifer Capriati**	**6**	**6**

Final
1	(Switzerland) Martina Hingis	0	**6**	4
2	(United States) **Jennifer Capriati**	**6**	4	**6**

=== Top half ===
==== Section 1 ====
First round
(Russia) A Myskina	3	3	r
Q	(Germany) **B Lamade**	**6**	**5**
(Colombia) C Castaño	**6**	4	4
(United States) **A Stevenson**	1	**6**	**6**
(Croatia) **I Majoli**	**6**	0	**6**
13	(Federal Republic of Yugoslavia) J Dokić	3	**6**	2
11	(United States) **L Raymond**	**6**	**6**
Q	(Japan) R Hiraki	3	0
(Australia) R McQuillan	1	3
(Bulgaria) **P Nola**	**6**	**6**
(United States) K Brandi	2	**6**	3
WC	(United States) **M Irvin**	**6**	2	**6**

Second round
1	(Switzerland) **M Hingis**	**7^{7}**	**6**
Q	(Germany) B Lamade	6^{4}	1
(United States) A Stevenson	1	3
(Croatia) **I Majoli**	**6**	**6**
11	(United States) **L Raymond**	**6**	**6**
(Bulgaria) P Nola	4	2
WC	(United States) M Irvin	2	**6**	3
7	(France) **A Mauresmo**	**6**	2	**6**

Third round
1	(Switzerland) **M Hingis**	4	**6**	**6**
(Croatia) I Majoli	**6**	2	3
11	(United States) L Raymond	5	5
7	(France) **A Mauresmo**	**7**	**7**

Quarterfinals
1	(Switzerland) **M Hingis**	**7**	**6**
7	(France) A Mauresmo	5	2

==== Section 2 ====
First round
Q	(South Africa) L Huber	3	**6**	0
(United States) **L Osterloh**	**6**	3	**6**
(Australia) **N Pratt**	**6**	**6**
(Spain) V Ruano Pascual	3	3
(South Africa) J Kruger	6^{5}	5
16	(Italy) **S Farina Elia**	**7^{7}**	**7**
10	(United States) **A Frazier**	**6**	**6**
(United States) J Craybas	4	1
(Germany) **A Glass**	4	**6**	**6**
WC	(France) N Dechy	**6**	3	3
(United States) **J Hopkins**	**6**	**7**
(Argentina) M Díaz Oliva	1	5

Second round
3	(Spain) **C Martínez**	1	**6**	**6**
(United States) L Osterloh	**6**	3	0
(Australia) **N Pratt**	3	**6**	**6**
16	(Italy) S Farina Elia	**6**	4	1
10	(United States) **A Frazier**	**6**	**6**
(Germany) A Glass	2	2
(United States) J Hopkins	2	2
6	(France) **M Pierce**	**6**	**6**

Third round
3	(Spain) **C Martínez**	**6**	**6**
(Australia) N Pratt	2	3
10	(United States) **A Frazier**	**7**	6^{1}	**6**
6	(France) M Pierce	5	**7^{7}**	4

Quarterfinals
3	(Spain) **C Martínez**	**6**	**6**
10	(United States) A Frazier	3	1

=== Bottom half ===
==== Section 3 ====
First round
(Japan) A Sugiyama	3	**7**	3
(Romania) **R Dragomir Ilie**	**6**	5	**6**
Q	(United States) E deLone	2	2
(Germany) **M Weingärtner**	**6**	**6**
(United States) C Morariu	3	2
12	(United States) **M Shaughnessy**	**6**	**6**
14	(Spain) **G León García**	**7^{7}**	6^{6}	**6**
(Switzerland) P Schnyder	6^{5}	**7^{8}**	2
Q	(Italy) **A Serra Zanetti**	**6**	**7**
Q	(China) J-Q Yi	4	5
(United States) M Tu	**6**	4	6^{0}
(Russia) **T Panova**	4	**6**	**7^{7}**

Second round
8	(United States) C Rubin	**6**	4	r
(Romania) **R Dragomir Ilie**	4	**4**
(Germany) **M Weingärtner**	**6**	**6**
12	(United States) M Shaughnessy	2	2
14	(Spain) **G León García**	**6**	**6**
Q	(Italy) A Serra Zanetti	1	4
(Russia) T Panova	2	2
4	(South Africa) **A Coetzer**	**6**	**6**

Third round
(Romania) R Dragomir Ilie	3	0
(Germany) **M Weingärtner**	**6**	**6**
14	(Spain) G León García	6^{1}	1
4	(South Africa) **A Coetzer**	**7^{7}**	**6**

Quarterfinals
(Germany) **M Weingärtner**	**6**	**7^{7}**
4	(South Africa) A Coetzer	4	6^{3}

==== Section 4 ====
First round
Q	(Austria) M Maruska	**6**	1	6^{5}
(Russia) **E Likhovtseva**	4	**6**	**7^{7}**
(Sweden) Å Carlsson	3	2
WC	(Argentina) **M E Salerni**	**6**	**6**
(Russia) N Petrova	6^{3}	r
9	(Argentina) **P Suárez**	**7^{7}**
15	(Slovakia) **H Nagyová**	**7^{7}**	**6**
(Canada) S Jeyaseelan	6^{1}	2
Q	(Germany) G Arn	3	4
(Canada) **J Nejedly**	**6**	**6**
(Paraguay) **R de los Ríos**	2	**6**	**6**
(Japan) S Asagoe	**6**	2	4

Second round
5	(Spain) A Sánchez-Vicario	3	4
(Russia) **E Likhovtseva**	**6**	**6**
WC	(Argentina) M E Salerni	0	1
9	(Argentina) **P Suárez**	**6**	**6**
15	(Slovakia) **H Nagyová**	**6**	**6**
(Canada) J Nejedly	1	3
(Paraguay) R de los Ríos	4	3
2	(United States) **J Capriati**	**6**	**6**

Third round
(Russia) **E Likhovtseva**	**6**	**7**
9	(Argentina) P Suárez	0	5
15	(Slovakia) H Nagyová	4	2
2	(United States) **J Capriati**	**6**	**6**

Quarterfinals
(Russia) E Likhovtseva	5	4
2	(United States) **J Capriati**	**7**	**6**
