= 2003 Family Circle Cup – Doubles =

Doubles
- 2003 Family Circle Cup

Final
- Champions: (Spain) Virginia Ruano Pascual (Argentina) Paola Suárez
- Runners-up: (Slovakia) Janette Husárová (Spain) Conchita Martínez
- Score: 6–0, 6–3

Details
- Draw: 8

Events
Singles	Doubles
← 2002 ·	Family Circle Cup	· 2004 →

Lisa Raymond and Rennae Stubbs were the defending champions, but Raymond did not compete in this edition. Stubbs teamed up with Elena Bovina and lost in quarterfinals to Virginia Ruano Pascual and Paola Suárez.

Virginia Ruano Pascual and Paola Suárez won the title, defeating Janette Husárová and Conchita Martínez 6–0, 6–3 in the final. It was the 19th title for Ruano Pascual and the 26th title for Suárez in their respective careers.

== Seeds ==
The first four seeds received a bye into the second round.

1. (Spain) Virginia Ruano Pascual / (Argentina) Paola Suárez (champions)
2. (Zimbabwe) Cara Black / (Russia) Elena Likhovtseva (quarterfinals)
3. (Slovakia) Janette Husárová / (Spain) Conchita Martínez (final)
4. (Federal Republic of Yugoslavia) Jelena Dokic / (Slovakia) Daniela Hantuchová (second round)
5. (Russia) Elena Bovina / (Australia) Rennae Stubbs (quarterfinals)
6. (United States) Lindsay Davenport / (United States) Meghann Shaughnessy (quarterfinals)
7. (Italy) Tathiana Garbin / (Russia) Nadia Petrova (second round)
8. (France) ~~Nathalie Dechy~~ / (France) ~~Émilie Loit~~ (withdrew)

== Draw ==
=== Key ===
- Q = Qualifier
- WC = Wild card
- LL = Lucky loser
- Alt = Alternate
- SE = Special exempt
- PR = Protected ranking
- ITF = ITF entry
- JE = Junior exempt
- w/o = Walkover
- r = Retired
- d = Defaulted
- SR = Special ranking

=== Finals ===
Semifinals
1	(Spain) Virginia Ruano Pascual (Argentina) Paola Suárez	6	6
WC	(United States) Ashley Harkleroad (United States) Mashona Washington	3	2
3	(Slovakia) Janette Husárová (Spain) Conchita Martínez	6^{4}	7	6
(Russia) Elena Dementieva (Russia) Lina Krasnoroutskaya	7^{7}	5	3

Final
1	(Spain) Virginia Ruano Pascual (Argentina) Paola Suárez	6	6
3	(Slovakia) Janette Husárová (Spain) Conchita Martínez	0	3

=== Top half ===
First round
(United States) S Reeves (Venezuela) M Sequera	7	4	6
(United States) T Ashley (United States) A Spears	5	6	4
(Austria) B Schett (Switzerland) P Schnyder	4	2
WC	(Russia) A Myskina (Kazakhstan) I Selyutina	6	6
(South Africa) A Coetzer (South Africa) J Steck	1	0
5	(Russia) E Bovina (Australia) R Stubbs	6	6
WC	(United States) A Harkleroad (United States) M Washington	4	6	6
(United States) J Hopkins (Russia) A Jidkova	6	0	2
Q	(Germany) A Barna (Netherlands) S Noorlander	6	6^{6}	6
WC	(United States) A Stevenson (Russia) V Zvonareva	1	7^{8}	4
(Australia) A Molik (United States) M Navratilova	6	6
LL	(United States) J Embry (Czech Republic) R Voráčová	3	2

Second round
1	(Spain) V Ruano Pascual (Argentina) P Suárez	7^{8}	6
(United States) S Reeves (Venezuela) M Sequera	6^{6}	0
WC	(Russia) A Myskina (Kazakhstan) I Selyutina	5	3
5	(Russia) E Bovina (Australia) R Stubbs	7	6
4	(Federal Republic of Yugoslavia) J Dokic (Slovakia) D Hantuchová	6^{3}	2
WC	(United States) A Harkleroad (United States) M Washington	7^{7}	6
Q	(Germany) A Barna (Netherlands) S Noorlander	1	6	4
(Australia) A Molik (United States) M Navratilova	6	4	6

Quarterfinals
1	(Spain) V Ruano Pascual (Argentina) P Suárez	6	6
5	(Russia) E Bovina (Australia) R Stubbs	3	0
WC	(United States) A Harkleroad (United States) M Washington	4	6	6
(Australia) A Molik (United States) M Navratilova	6	4	4

Semifinals
1	(Spain) V Ruano Pascual (Argentina) P Suárez	6	6
WC	(United States) A Harkleroad (United States) M Washington	3	2

=== Bottom half ===
First round
6	(United States) L Davenport (United States) M Shaughnessy	6	6
(Croatia) I Majoli (Slovenia) M Matevžič	2	1
(Argentina) P Tarabini (Netherlands) C Vis	6	7^{8}
(Argentina) C Fernández (Australia) N Pratt	3	6^{6}
PR	(Canada) S Jeyaseelan (South Africa) J Kruger	1^{r}
(United States) M Tu (Venezuela) M Vento-Kabchi	6
7	(Italy) T Garbin (Russia) N Petrova	7	6
(Japan) R Fujiwara (Russia) T Panova	5	2
(Russia) E Dementieva (Russia) L Krasnoroutskaya	6^{6}	6	6
(France) M Bartoli (Australia) E Dominikovic	7^{8}	2	4
(Belgium) E Callens (South Africa) L Huber	3	4
(Czech Republic) D Bedáňová (Uzbekistan) I Tulyaganova	6	6

Second round
6	(United States) L Davenport (United States) M Shaughnessy	6	6
(Argentina) P Tarabini (Netherlands) C Vis	2	0
(United States) M Tu (Venezuela) M Vento-Kabchi	0	4
3	(Slovakia) J Husárová (Spain) C Martínez	6	6
7	(Italy) T Garbin (Russia) N Petrova	6	2	1
(Russia) E Dementieva (Russia) L Krasnoroutskaya	1	6	6
(Czech Republic) D Bedáňová (Uzbekistan) I Tulyaganova	4	6^{3}
2	(Zimbabwe) C Black (Russia) E Likhovtseva	6	7^{7}

Quarterfinals
6	(United States) L Davenport (United States) M Shaughnessy	6	3	2
3	(Slovakia) J Husárová (Spain) C Martínez	2	6	6
(Russia) E Dementieva (Russia) L Krasnoroutskaya	6	7^{7}
2	(Zimbabwe) C Black (Russia) E Likhovtseva	4	6^{4}

Semifinals
3	(Slovakia) J Husárová (Spain) C Martínez	6^{4}	7	6
(Russia) E Dementieva (Russia) L Krasnoroutskaya	7^{7}	5	3
