= 2002 Italian Open – Women's doubles =

Tennis tournament

Women's doubles
- 2002 Italian Open

Final
- Champions: (Spain) Virginia Ruano Pascual (Argentina) Paola Suárez
- Runners-up: (Spain) Conchita Martínez (Argentina) Patricia Tarabini
- Score: 6–3, 6–4

Details
- Draw: 28 (2WC/1Q/1LL)
- Seeds: 8

Events
Singles	men	women
Doubles	men	women
← 2001 ·	Italian Open	· 2003 →

Cara Black and Elena Likhovtseva were the defending champions, but lost in semifinals to Conchita Martínez and Patricia Tarabini.

Virginia Ruano Pascual and Paola Suárez won the title by defeating Conchita Martínez and Patricia Tarabini 6–3, 6–4 in the final. It was the 13th title for Ruano Pascual and the 21st title for Suárez in their respective doubles careers. It was also the 3rd title for the pair during the season, after their wins in Bogotá and Acapulco.

== Seeds ==
The first four seeds received a bye into the second round.

1. (Zimbabwe) Cara Black / (Russia) Elena Likhovtseva (semifinals)
2. (Spain) Virginia Ruano Pascual / (Argentina) Paola Suárez (champions)
3. (Belgium) Els Callens / (Russia) Anna Kournikova (second round, withdrew due to a thigh strain on Kournikova)
4. (France) Sandrine Testud / (Italy) Roberta Vinci (semifinals)
5. (United States) Nicole Arendt / (South Africa) Liezel Huber (first round)
6. (Slovenia) Tina Križan / (Slovenia) Katarina Srebotnik (first round)
7. (Spain) Conchita Martínez / (Argentina) Patricia Tarabini (final)
8. (Italy) Silvia Farina Elia / (Austria) Barbara Schett (quarterfinals)

== Draw ==
=== Key ===
- Q = Qualifier
- WC = Wild card
- LL = Lucky loser
- Alt = Alternate
- ITF = ITF entry
- PR = Protected ranking
- SR = Special ranking
- SE = Special exempt
- JE = Junior exempt
- JR = Junior Accelerator Programme entrant
- CO = College Accelerator Programme entrant
- NG = Next Gen Accelerator Program entrant
- w/o = Walkover
- r = Retired
- d = Defaulted

=== Finals ===
Semifinals
1	(Zimbabwe) Cara Black (Russia) Elena Likhovtseva	3	6	3
7	(Spain) Conchita Martínez (Argentina) Patricia Tarabini	6	3	6
4	(France) Sandrine Testud (Italy) Roberta Vinci	1	6	4
2	(Spain) Virginia Ruano Pascual (Argentina) Paola Suárez	6	2	6

Final
7	(Spain) Conchita Martínez (Argentina) Patricia Tarabini	3	4
2	(Spain) Virginia Ruano Pascual (Argentina) Paola Suárez	6	6

=== Top half ===
First round
(Slovakia) H Nagyová (United States) S Reeves	4	5
WC	(Italy) Ad Serra Zanetti (Italy) An Serra Zanetti	6	7
(Thailand) T Tanasugarn (Ukraine) E Tatarkova	7	3	6
(South Africa) K Grant (United States) A Spears	5	6	3
(Argentina) ME Salerni (Kazakhstan) I Selyutina	4	1
8	(Italy) S Farina Elia (Austria) B Schett	6	6
LL	(Russia) T Panova (Belarus) T Poutchek	5	1
(Japan) R Fujiwara (Japan) A Sugiyama	7	6
(Russia) E Dementieva (Slovakia) J Husárová	6	6
(Slovenia) M Matevžič (United States) K Schlukebir	2	1
(South Africa) S de Beer (South Africa) N de Villiers	2	4
7	(Spain) C Martínez (Argentina) P Tarabini	6	6

Second round
1	(Zimbabwe) C Black (Russia) E Likhovtseva	6	6
WC	(Italy) Ad Serra Zanetti (Italy) An Serra Zanetti	3	2
(Thailand) T Tanasugarn (Ukraine) E Tatarkova	7	3	3
8	(Italy) S Farina Elia (Austria) B Schett	5	6	6
3	(Belgium) E Callens (Russia) A Kournikova
(Japan) R Fujiwara (Japan) A Sugiyama	w/o
(Russia) E Dementieva (Slovakia) J Husárová	4	4
7	(Spain) C Martínez (Argentina) P Tarabini	6	6

Quarterfinals
1	(Zimbabwe) C Black (Russia) E Likhovtseva	7	6
8	(Italy) S Farina Elia (Austria) B Schett	5	4
(Japan) R Fujiwara (Japan) A Sugiyama	6	3	2
7	(Spain) C Martínez (Argentina) P Tarabini	2	6	6

Semifinals
1	(Zimbabwe) C Black (Russia) E Likhovtseva	3	6	3
7	(Spain) C Martínez (Argentina) P Tarabini	6	3	6

=== Bottom half ===
First round
6	(Slovenia) T Križan (Slovenia) K Srebotnik	4	7	4
(Netherlands) M Oremans (Spain) M Serna	6	5	6
(Sweden) Å Svensson (Uzbekistan) I Tulyaganova	6	5	3
Q	(Paraguay) R de los Ríos (United States) L Osterloh	2	7	6
(Italy) T Garbin (Argentina) L Montalvo	6	4	2
(Italy) R Grande (Switzerland) P Schnyder	3	6	6
5	(United States) N Arendt (South Africa) L Huber	2	4
(France) N Dechy (United States) M Tu	6	6
(Spain) M Marrero (Spain) MJ Martínez	6	1	4
WC	(United States) M Navratilova (Belarus) N Zvereva	1	6	6
(Belgium) J Henin (United States) M Shaughnessy	4	6	6
(France) A Fusai (Netherlands) C Vis	6	4	4

Second round
(Netherlands) M Oremans (Spain) M Serna	6^{6}	1
Q	(Paraguay) R de los Ríos (United States) L Osterloh	7^{8}	6
(Italy) R Grande (Switzerland) P Schnyder	6^{4}	2
4	(France) S Testud (Italy) R Vinci	7^{7}	6
(France) N Dechy (United States) M Tu	1	6^{5}
WC	(United States) M Navratilova (Belarus) N Zvereva	6	7^{7}
(Belgium) J Henin (United States) M Shaughnessy
2	(Spain) V Ruano Pascual (Argentina) P Suárez	w/o

Quarterfinals
Q	(Paraguay) R de los Ríos (United States) L Osterloh	3	1
4	(France) S Testud (Italy) R Vinci	6	6
WC	(United States) M Navratilova (Belarus) N Zvereva	3	4
2	(Spain) V Ruano Pascual (Argentina) P Suárez	6	6

Semifinals
4	(France) S Testud (Italy) R Vinci	1	6	4
2	(Spain) V Ruano Pascual (Argentina) P Suárez	6	2	6

== Qualifying ==
=== Seeds ===
1. (Russia) Tatiana Panova / (Belarus) Tatiana Poutchek (qualifying competition, lucky losers)
2. (Russia) Alina Jidkova / (Romania) Andreea Vanc (first round)

=== Qualifiers ===
1. (Paraguay) Rossana de los Ríos / (United States) Lilia Osterloh

=== Lucky losers ===
1. (Russia) Tatiana Panova / (Belarus) Tatiana Poutchek

=== Qualifying draw ===
First round
1	(Russia) Tatiana Panova (Belarus) Tatiana Poutchek	9^{7}
WC	(Italy) Maria Elena Camerin (Argentina) Clarisa Fernández	8^{3}
(Paraguay) Rossana de los Ríos (United States) Lilia Osterloh	9^{15}
2	(Russia) Alina Jidkova (Romania) Andreea Vanc	8^{13}

Qualifying competition
1	(Russia) Tatiana Panova (Belarus) Tatiana Poutchek	6^{6}	3
(Paraguay) Rossana de los Ríos (United States) Lilia Osterloh	7^{8}	6
