= 2000 Family Circle Cup =

- Date: April 17–23
- Edition: 28th
- Category: Tier I
- Draw: 56S / 28D
- Prize money: $1,080,000
- Surface: Clay / outdoor
- Location: Hilton Head Island, South Carolina, United States
- Venue: Sea Pines Plantation

Champions

Singles
- (France) Mary Pierce

Doubles
- (Spain) Virginia Ruano Pascual (Argentina) Paola Suárez
| ← 1999 · | Family Circle Cup | · 2001 → |

The 2000 Family Circle Cup was the 28th edition of the Family Circle Cup tennis tournament. This WTA Tier I Event was held at the Sea Pines Plantation in Hilton Head, South Carolina, United States. First-seeded Mary Pierce won the singles title and earned $166,000 first-prize money.

It was the final edition of the tournament held at Hilton Head Island as the event moved to Charleston, South Carolina in 2001.

== Finals ==
=== Singles ===
(France) Mary Pierce defeated (Spain) Arantxa Sánchez Vicario, 6–1, 6–0

=== Doubles ===
(Spain) Virginia Ruano Pascual and (Argentina) Paola Suárez defeated (Spain) Conchita Martínez and (Argentina) Patricia Tarabini, 7–5, 6–3
