= 2004 Family Circle Cup – Doubles =

Doubles
- 2004 Family Circle Cup

Final
- Champions: (Spain) Virginia Ruano Pascual (Argentina) Paola Suárez
- Runners-up: (United States) Martina Navratilova (United States) Lisa Raymond
- Score: 6–4, 6–1

Details
- Seeds: 8

Events
Singles	Doubles
← 2003 ·	Family Circle Cup	· 2005 →

Virginia Ruano Pascual and Paola Suárez were the defending champions and successfully defended their title, by defeating Martina Navratilova and Lisa Raymond 6–4, 6–1 in the final.

It was the 26th title for Ruano Pascual and the 33rd for Suárez in their respective careers. It was also the 3rd title for the pair during the season, after their wins in the Australian Open and Indian Wells.

== Seeds ==
The first four seeds received a bye into the second round.

1. (Spain) Virginia Ruano Pascual / (Argentina) Paola Suárez (champions)
2. (United States) Martina Navratilova / (United States) Lisa Raymond (final)
3. (Zimbabwe) Cara Black / (Australia) Rennae Stubbs (semifinals)
4. (South Africa) Liezel Huber / (United States) Corina Morariu (quarterfinals)
5. (China) Sun Tiantian / (United States) Meilen Tu (quarterfinals)
6. (Russia) Lina Krasnoroutskaya / (Russia) Vera Zvonareva (quarterfinals)
7. (China) Yan Zi / (China) Zheng Jie (first round)
8. (Australia) Nicole Pratt / (Switzerland) Patty Schnyder (semifinals)

== Draw ==
=== Key ===
- Q = Qualifier
- WC = Wild card
- LL = Lucky loser
- Alt = Alternate
- ITF = ITF entry
- PR = Protected ranking
- SR = Special ranking
- SE = Special exempt
- JE = Junior exempt
- JR = Junior Accelerator Programme entrant
- CO = College Accelerator Programme entrant
- NG = Next Gen Accelerator Program entrant
- w/o = Walkover
- r = Retired
- d = Defaulted

=== Finals ===
Semifinals
1	(Spain) Virginia Ruano Pascual (Argentina) Paola Suárez	2	6	6
3	(Zimbabwe) Cara Black (Australia) Rennae Stubbs	6	1	4
8	(Australia) Nicole Pratt (Switzerland) Patty Schnyder	4	6^{7}
2	(United States) Martina Navratilova (United States) Lisa Raymond	6	7^{9}

Final
1	(Spain) Virginia Ruano Pascual (Argentina) Paola Suárez	6	6
2	(United States) Martina Navratilova (United States) Lisa Raymond	4	1

=== Top half ===
First round
(United States) A Cargill (United States) J Embry	2	6	4
(United States) S Perry (Colombia) F Zuluaga	6	4	6
(United States) J Hopkins (United States) A Spears	6^{3}	4
(Australia) L McShea (Venezuela) M Sequera	7^{7}	6
(Chinese Taipei) J Lee (Thailand) T Tanasugarn	6	6
7	(China) Z Yan (China) J Zheng	4	0
(United States) T Snyder (United States) N Uberoi	5	3
(Ukraine) Y Fedak (Slovenia) P Rampre	7	6
(Canada) M Drake (Germany) M Weingärtner	7	6
(Greece) E Daniilidou (Greece) C Zachariadou	5	2
(United States) J Craybas (Australia) B Stewart	3	1
6	(Russia) L Krasnoroutskaya (Russia) V Zvonareva	6	6

Second round
1	(Spain) V Ruano Pascual (Argentina) P Suárez	6	6
(United States) S Perry (Colombia) F Zuluaga	2	2
(Australia) L McShea (Venezuela) M Sequera	6^{7}	4
(Chinese Taipei) J Lee (Thailand) T Tanasugarn	7^{9}	6
3	(Zimbabwe) C Black (Australia) R Stubbs	6	6
(Ukraine) Y Fedak (Slovenia) P Rampre	0	3
(Canada) M Drake (Germany) M Weingärtner	1	3
6	(Russia) L Krasnoroutskaya (Russia) V Zvonareva	6	6

Quarterfinals
1	(Spain) V Ruano Pascual (Argentina) P Suárez	6	6
(Chinese Taipei) J Lee (Thailand) T Tanasugarn	3	0
3	(Zimbabwe) C Black (Australia) R Stubbs	7	6
6	(Russia) L Krasnoroutskaya (Russia) V Zvonareva	5	4

Semifinals
1	(Spain) V Ruano Pascual (Argentina) P Suárez	2	6	6
3	(Zimbabwe) C Black (Australia) R Stubbs	6	1	4

=== Bottom half ===
First round
8	(Australia) N Pratt (Switzerland) P Schnyder	6	6
(Russia) A Jidkova (Russia) T Panova	1	4
(Japan) N Miyagi (United States) S Reeves	3	2
(Japan) S Asagoe (United States) M Washington	6	6
(Spain) A Medina Garrigues (Spain) A Parra Santonja	6	6
(United States) M Irvin (Serbia and Montenegro) J Janković	2	3
5	(China) T Sun (United States) M Tu	6	6
(Switzerland) MG Mikaelian (Luxembourg) C Schaul	4	4
(Germany) A Barna (United States) A Harkleroad	2	4
WC	(Russia) E Dementieva (Croatia) K Šprem	6	6
(United States) T Ashley (United States) L Granville	6	6
(Croatia) J Kostanić (Ukraine) T Perebiynis	3	0

Second round
8	(Australia) N Pratt (Switzerland) P Schnyder	7^{7}	6
(Japan) S Asagoe (United States) M Washington	6^{3}	3
(Spain) A Medina Garrigues (Spain) A Parra Santonja	2	3
4	(South Africa) L Huber (United States) C Morariu	6	6
5	(China) T Sun (United States) M Tu	2	6	6
WC	(Russia) E Dementieva (Croatia) K Šprem	6	2	3
(United States) T Ashley (United States) L Granville	1	3
2	(United States) M Navratilova (United States) L Raymond	6	6

Quarterfinals
8	(Australia) N Pratt (Switzerland) P Schnyder	6	6
4	(South Africa) L Huber (United States) C Morariu	4	3
5	(China) T Sun (United States) M Tu	2	4
2	(United States) M Navratilova (United States) L Raymond	6	6

Semifinals
8	(Australia) N Pratt (Switzerland) P Schnyder	4	6^{7}
2	(United States) M Navratilova (United States) L Raymond	6	7^{9}
