= 2004 Family Circle Cup – Singles =

Singles
- 2004 Family Circle Cup

Final
- Champion: (United States) Venus Williams
- Runner-up: (Spain) Conchita Martínez
- Score: 2–6, 6–2, 6–1

Details
- Draw: 56
- Seeds: 16

Events
Singles	Doubles
← 2003 ·	Family Circle Cup	· 2005 →

Venus Williams defeated Conchita Martínez in the final, 2–6, 6–2, 6–1 to win the singles tennis title at the 2004 Family Circle Cup. It was Williams' 30th career title.

Justine Henin-Hardenne was the reigning champion, but did not compete this year due to hypoglycemia.

== Seeds ==
The first nine seeds received a bye into the second round.

1. (Belgium) ~~Justine Henin-Hardenne~~ (withdrew due to a hypoglycemia)
2. (United States) Serena Williams (third round, withdrew due to a left knee inflammation)
3. (France) ~~Amélie Mauresmo~~ (withdrew due to a right lower back strain)
4. (United States) Venus Williams (champion)
5. (United States) Lindsay Davenport (quarterfinals)
6. (Russia) Elena Dementieva (third round)
7. (United States) Jennifer Capriati (third round)
8. (Russia) Nadia Petrova (quarterfinals)
9. (Russia) Vera Zvonareva (quarterfinals)
10. (Argentina) Paola Suárez (second round)
11. (Switzerland) Patty Schnyder (semifinals)
12. (Serbia and Montenegro) Jelena Dokic (second round)
13. (Israel) Anna Smashnova-Pistolesi (third round)
14. (Colombia) Fabiola Zuluaga (first round)
15. (France) Nathalie Dechy (first round)
16. (Spain) Conchita Martínez (final)
17. (Greece) Eleni Daniilidou (first round)

== Draw ==
=== Key ===
- Q = Qualifier
- WC = Wild card
- LL = Lucky loser
- Alt = Alternate
- SE = Special exempt
- PR = Protected ranking
- ITF = ITF entry
- JE = Junior exempt
- w/o = Walkover
- r = Retired
- d = Defaulted
- SR = Special ranking

=== Finals ===
Quarterfinals
(Croatia) Jelena Kostanić	7^{7}	6
(Hungary) Petra Mandula	6^{4}	2
PR/4	(United States) Venus Williams	6	6
9	(Russia) Vera Zvonareva	3	4
11	(Switzerland) Patty Schnyder	6	6
5	(United States) Lindsay Davenport	3	2
8	(Russia) Nadia Petrova	3	1
16	(Spain) Conchita Martínez	6	6

Semifinals
(Croatia) Jelena Kostanić	4	1
PR/4	(United States) Venus Williams	6	6
11	(Switzerland) Patty Schnyder	4	3
16	(Spain) Conchita Martínez	6	6

Final
PR/4	(United States) Venus Williams	2	6	6
16	(Spain) Conchita Martínez	6	2	1

=== Top half ===
==== Section 1 ====
First round
Q	(Ukraine) T Perebiynis	6	6^{3}	0
(Croatia) J Kostanić	4	7^{7}	6
(United States) L Raymond	5	6	2
Q	(Madagascar) D Randriantefy	7	2	6
(Croatia) K Šprem	6	6
15	(France) N Dechy	4	4
12	(Serbia and Montenegro) J Dokic	6	5	7
Q	(Russia) T Panova	0	7	5
(United States) A Harkleroad	3	1
(Hungary) P Mandula	6	6
(Russia) L Krasnoroutskaya	6	7
(Germany) A Barna	1	5

Second round
LL	(United States) S Perry	1	4
(Croatia) J Kostanić	6	6
Q	(Madagascar) D Randriantefy	6	5	6
(Croatia) K Šprem	3	7	4
12	(Serbia and Montenegro) J Dokic	6^{2}	6	2
(Hungary) P Mandula	7^{7}	3	6
(Russia) L Krasnoroutskaya	3	1
7	(United States) J Capriati	6	6

Third round
(Croatia) J Kostanić	6	6
Q	(Madagascar) D Randriantefy	3	1
(Hungary) P Mandula	7^{7}	3	7
7	(United States) J Capriati	6^{3}	6	5

Quarterfinals
(Croatia) J Kostanić	7^{7}	6
(Hungary) P Mandula	6^{4}	2

==== Section 2 ====
First round
LL	(United States) S Reeves	6	2	6
(United States) L Granville	1	6	3
(Spain) M Sánchez Lorenzo	2	3
(Spain) V Ruano Pascual	6	6
WC	(Switzerland) MG Mikaelian	6	6
14	(Colombia) F Zuluaga	2	2
13	(Israel) A Smashnova-Pistolesi	6	6
Q	(Japan) Y Yoshida	1	1
(Puerto Rico) K Brandi	3	6	7
(Luxembourg) C Schaul	6	3	5
Q	(France) S Beltrame	2	6	7
(China) J Zheng	6	4	5

Second round
PR/4	(United States) V Williams	4	6	6
LL	(United States) S Reeves	6	4	3
(Spain) V Ruano Pascual	3	6^{0}
WC	(Switzerland) MG Mikaelian	6	7^{7}
13	(Israel) A Smashnova-Pistolesi	0	6	6
(Puerto Rico) K Brandi	6	1	2
Q	(France) S Beltrame	4	0
9	(Russia) V Zvonareva	6	6

Third round
PR/4	(United States) V Williams	6	6
WC	(Switzerland) MG Mikaelian	4	1
13	(Israel) A Smashnova-Pistolesi	0	6	3
9	(Russia) V Zvonareva	6	3	6

Quarterfinals
PR/4	(United States) V Williams	6	6
9	(Russia) V Zvonareva	3	4

=== Bottom half ===
==== Section 3 ====
First round
(Spain) A Medina Garrigues	6	6
(Zimbabwe) C Black	4	0
(United States) A Frazier	6	6
WC	(United States) M Navratilova	4	4
(Germany) M Weingärtner	5	6^{2}
11	(Switzerland) P Schnyder	7	7^{7}
17	(Greece) E Daniilidou	7	4	2
Q	(Colombia) C Castaño	5	6	6
(Australia) N Pratt	6	7^{7}
WC	(United States) A Stevenson	4	6^{3}
(United States) J Craybas	4	6	3
(Serbia and Montenegro) J Janković	6	3	6

Second round
6	(Russia) E Dementieva	6	6
(Spain) A Medina Garrigues	2	2
(United States) A Frazier	4	6	3
11	(Switzerland) P Schnyder	6	4	6
Q	(Colombia) C Castaño	6	6^{3}	5
(Australia) N Pratt	4	7^{7}	7
(Serbia and Montenegro) J Janković	5	3
5	(United States) L Davenport	7	6

Third round
6	(Russia) E Dementieva	3	1
11	(Switzerland) P Schnyder	6	6
(Australia) N Pratt	1	1
5	(United States) L Davenport	6	6

Quarterfinals
11	(Switzerland) P Schnyder	6	6
5	(United States) L Davenport	3	2

==== Section 4 ====
First round
(Japan) A Morigami	6	6
(France) M Pierce	2	3
LL	(Russia) A Jidkova	6	6
(Japan) S Asagoe	4	1
PR	(Luxembourg) A Kremer	4	4
10	(Argentina) P Suárez	6	6
16	(Spain) C Martínez	6	6
Q	(China) T Sun	1	0
(Thailand) T Tanasugarn	4	6	4
Q	(United States) T Ashley	6	4	6
(Spain) A Parra Santonja	6	5	1
WC	(United States) K McCain	2	7	6

Second round
8	(Russia) N Petrova	6	4	7^{9}
(Japan) A Morigami	3	6	6^{7}
LL	(Russia) A Jidkova	4	6	6
10	(Argentina) P Suárez	6	4	3
16	(Spain) C Martínez	6	6
Q	(United States) T Ashley	1	4
WC	(United States) K McCain	1	0
PR/2	(United States) S Williams	6	6

Third round
8	(Russia) N Petrova	6	6
LL	(Russia) A Jidkova	1	1
16	(Spain) C Martínez	w/o
PR/2	(United States) S Williams

Quarterfinals
8	(Russia) N Petrova	3	1
16	(Spain) C Martínez	6	6
