= 2000 Family Circle Cup – Doubles =

Doubles
- 2000 Family Circle Cup

Final
- Champions: (Spain) Virginia Ruano Pascual (Argentina) Paola Suárez
- Runners-up: (Spain) Conchita Martínez (Argentina) Patricia Tarabini
- Score: 7–5, 6–3

Details
- Draw: 28
- Seeds: 8

Events
Singles	Doubles
← 1999 ·	Family Circle Cup	· 2001 →

Elena Likhovtseva and Jana Novotná were the defending champions, but none of them competed this year. Novotná also retired from professional tennis at the end of the 1999 season.

Virginia Ruano Pascual and Paola Suárez won the title by defeating Conchita Martínez and Patricia Tarabini 7–5, 6–3 in the final. It was the 5th title for Ruano Pascual and the 13th title for Suárez in their respective doubles careers. It was also the 1st title for the pair during the season.

== Seeds ==
The first four seeds received a bye into the second round.

1. (United States) Corina Morariu / (Latvia) Larisa Neiland (quarterfinals)
2. (United States) Lisa Raymond / (Australia) Rennae Stubbs (quarterfinals)
3. (Russia) Anna Kournikova / (Spain) Arantxa Sánchez Vicario (quarterfinals)
4. (United States) Nicole Arendt / (Netherlands) Caroline Vis (second round)
5. (South Africa) Liezel Horn / (United States) Kimberly Po (second round)
6. (Italy) ~~Rita Grande~~ / (Russia) ~~Elena Likhovtseva~~ (withdrew)
7. (Spain) Conchita Martínez / (Argentina) Patricia Tarabini (final)
8. (Spain) Virginia Ruano Pascual / (Argentina) Paola Suárez (champions)
9. (Argentina) Florencia Labat / (Argentina) Laura Montalvo (first round)

== Draw ==
Key

- Q = Qualifier
- WC = Wild card
- LL = Lucky loser
- Alt = Alternate
- ITF = ITF entry
- PR = Protected ranking
- SR = Special ranking
- SE = Special exempt
- JE = Junior exempt
- JR = Junior Accelerator Programme entrant
- CO = College Accelerator Programme entrant
- NG = Next Gen Accelerator Program entrant
- w/o = Walkover
- r = Retired
- d = Defaulted

=== Finals ===
Semifinals
(South Africa) Amanda Coetzer (United States) Lori McNeil	4	4
7	(Spain) Conchita Martínez (Argentina) Patricia Tarabini	6	6
(South Africa) Surina De Beer (Japan) Nana Miyagi	3	2
8	(Spain) Virginia Ruano Pascual (Argentina) Paola Suárez	6	6

Final
7	(Spain) Conchita Martínez (Argentina) Patricia Tarabini	5	3
8	(Spain) Virginia Ruano Pascual (Argentina) Paola Suárez	7	6

=== Top half ===
First round
(United States) E deLone (Australia) N Pratt	7	3	6
(South Africa) N de Villiers (South Africa) J Steck	5	6	4
(Australia) C Barclay (Australia) A Ellwood	1	1
(Sweden) Å Carlsson (Canada) S Jeyaseelan	6	6
(South Africa) A Coetzer (United States) L McNeil	6	6
9	(Argentina) F Labat (Argentina) L Montalvo	4	1
(Luxembourg) A Kremer (United States) M Tu	4	3
(Australia) J Dokic (United States) A Stevenson	6	6
(Slovakia) H Nagyová (Spain) M Serna	6	6
(United States) H Parkinson (United States) B Rippner	1	3
(South Africa) J Kruger (United States) T Snyder	2	2
7	(Spain) C Martínez (Argentina) P Tarabini	6	6

Second round
1	(United States) C Morariu (Latvia) L Neiland	6	7
(United States) E deLone (Australia) N Pratt	0	5
(Sweden) Å Carlsson (Canada) S Jeyaseelan	4	6^{6}
(South Africa) A Coetzer (United States) L McNeil	6	7^{8}
3	(Russia) A Kournikova (Spain) A Sánchez Vicario	6	6
(Australia) J Dokic (United States) A Stevenson	0	3
(Slovakia) H Nagyová (Spain) M Serna	4	3
7	(Spain) C Martínez (Argentina) P Tarabini	6	6

Quarterfinals
1	(United States) C Morariu (Latvia) L Neiland	6	3	1
(South Africa) A Coetzer (United States) L McNeil	4	6	6
3	(Russia) A Kournikova (Spain) A Sánchez Vicario	4	2
7	(Spain) C Martínez (Argentina) P Tarabini	6	6

Semifinals
(South Africa) A Coetzer (United States) L McNeil	4	4
7	(Spain) C Martínez (Argentina) P Tarabini	6	6

=== Bottom half ===
First round
5	(South Africa) L Horn (United States) K Po	6	6
(Slovenia) T Pisnik (United States) M Shaughnessy	3	3
(South Africa) S De Beer (Japan) N Miyagi	6	6
LL	(United States) K Brandi (United States) J Hopkins	1	4
(United States) A Frazier (United States) K Schlukebir	6	6
(Bulgaria) P Nola (United States) S Reeves	3	2
8	(Spain) V Ruano Pascual (Argentina) P Suárez	6	6
(Switzerland) E Gagliardi (Switzerland) P Schnyder	2	1
(Japan) R Hiraki (Netherlands) S Noorlander	6	6
(United States) L Osterloh (United States) M Washington	1	3
(Romania) R Dragomir (United States) L Wild	6	4	3
Q	(Russia) A Myskina (Russia) T Panova	4	6	6

Second round
5	(South Africa) L Horn (United States) K Po	6^{1}	1
(South Africa) S De Beer (Japan) N Miyagi	7^{7}	6
(United States) A Frazier (United States) K Schlukebir	6^{1}	6	7^{7}
4	(United States) N Arendt (Netherlands) C Vis	7^{7}	0	6^{3}
8	(Spain) V Ruano Pascual (Argentina) P Suárez	6^{5}	6	6
(Japan) R Hiraki (Netherlands) S Noorlander	7^{7}	1	3
Q	(Russia) A Myskina (Russia) T Panova	3	1
2	(United States) L Raymond (Australia) R Stubbs	6	6

Quarterfinals
(South Africa) S De Beer (Japan) N Miyagi	6	6
(United States) A Frazier (United States) K Schlukebir	1	2
8	(Spain) V Ruano Pascual (Argentina) P Suárez	6	4	7^{7}
2	(United States) L Raymond (Australia) R Stubbs	4	6	6^{3}

Semifinals
(South Africa) S De Beer (Japan) N Miyagi	3	2
8	(Spain) V Ruano Pascual (Argentina) P Suárez	6	6
