= 2002 Family Circle Cup =

- Date: April 15–21
- Edition: 30th
- Category: WTA Tier I Event
- Draw: 64S / 32D
- Prize money: $1,224,000
- Surface: Clay / outdoor
- Location: Charleston, SC, US
- Venue: Family Circle Tennis Center
- Attendance: 89,395

Champions

Singles
- (Croatia) Iva Majoli

Doubles
- (United States) Lisa Raymond / (Australia) Rennae Stubbs
← 2001 ·	Family Circle Cup	· 2003 →

The 2002 Family Circle Cup was a women's tennis tournament and the 30th edition of the Family Circle Cup. This WTA Tier I event was held from April 15 through April 21, 1997 at the Family Circle Tennis Center in Charleston, South Carolina, United States. Unseeded Iva Majoli won the singles title. Unseeded Iva Majoli won the singles title.

== Finals ==
=== Singles ===
(Croatia) Iva Majoli defeated (Switzerland) Patty Schnyder 7–6^{(7–5)}, 6–4

- It was Majoli's only singles title of the year and the 8th and last of her career.

=== Doubles ===
(United States) Lisa Raymond / (Australia) Rennae Stubbs defeated (France) Alexandra Fusai / (Netherlands) Caroline Vis 6–4, 3–6, 7–6^{(7–4)}
