= 2000 Family Circle Cup – Singles =

Singles
- 2000 Family Circle Cup

Final
- Champion: (France) Mary Pierce
- Runner-up: (Spain) Arantxa Sánchez Vicario
- Score: 6–1, 6–0

Details
- Draw: 56
- Seeds: 16

Events
Singles	Doubles
← 1999 ·	Family Circle Cup	· 2001 →

Mary Pierce defeated Arantxa Sánchez Vicario in the final, 6–1, 6–0 to win the singles tennis title at the 2000 Family Circle Cup. She lost just 12 games during the tournament, surpassing Chris Evert's record of 15 games conceded during her title win in 1985. It was the 1st title of the year for Pierce and the 14th of her career.

Martina Hingis was the reigning champion, but did not compete this year.

== Seeds ==
The first eight seeds received a bye into the second round.

1. (France) Mary Pierce (champion)
2. (Spain) Conchita Martínez (semifinals)
3. (United States) Monica Seles (semifinals)
4. (Spain) Arantxa Sánchez Vicario (final)
5. (Austria) Barbara Schett (second round)
6. (Russia) Anna Kournikova (third round)
7. (United States) Amy Frazier (third round)
8. (South Africa) Amanda Coetzer (quarterfinals)
9. (Russia) Elena Likhovtseva (third round)
10. (Croatia) Silvija Talaja (first round)
11. (Romania) Ruxandra Dragomir (quarterfinals)
12. (United States) Lisa Raymond (third round)
13. (Switzerland) Patty Schnyder (third round)
14. (United States) Corina Morariu (second round)
15. (Russia) Elena Dementieva (third round)
16. (Luxembourg) Anne Kremer (first round)

== Draw ==
Key

- Q = Qualifier
- WC = Wild card
- LL = Lucky loser
- Alt = Alternate
- ITF = ITF entry
- PR = Protected ranking
- SR = Special ranking
- SE = Special exempt
- JE = Junior exempt
- JR = Junior Accelerator Programme entrant
- CO = College Accelerator Programme entrant
- NG = Next Gen Accelerator Program entrant
- w/o = Walkover
- r = Retired
- d = Defaulted

=== Finals ===
Quarterfinals
1	(France) Mary Pierce	6	6
(Australia) Jelena Dokic	3	1
3	(United States) Monica Seles	6	6
11	(Romania) Ruxandra Dragomir	1	1
8	(South Africa) Amanda Coetzer	6^{12}	6	3
4	(Spain) Arantxa Sánchez Vicario	7^{14}	3	6
(Canada) Jana Nejedly	2	1
2	(Spain) Conchita Martínez	6	6

Semifinals
1	(France) Mary Pierce	6	6
3	(United States) Monica Seles	1	1
4	(Spain) Arantxa Sánchez Vicario	7	7
2	(Spain) Conchita Martínez	5	5

Final
1	(France) Mary Pierce	6	6
4	(Spain) Arantxa Sánchez Vicario	1	0

=== Top half ===
==== Section 1 ====
First round
Q	(Japan) N Miyagi	6	1	3
(Spain) G León García	4	6	6
Q	(Germany) A Barna	2	4
(Israel) A Smashnova	6	6
(Germany) A Glass	4	7	3
14	(United States) C Morariu	6	5	6
16	(Luxembourg) A Kremer	4	2
(Australia) N Pratt	6	6
Q	(South Africa) L Horn	4	2
(Australia) J Dokic	6	6
(Russia) T Panova	4	6	1
Q	(United States) B Rippner	6	4	6

Second round
1	(France) M Pierce	6	6
(Spain) G León García	1	1
(Israel) A Smashnova	7	3	6
14	(United States) C Morariu	5	6	2
(Australia) N Pratt	4	1
(Australia) J Dokic	6	6
Q	(United States) B Rippner	6^{2}	5
7	(United States) A Frazier	7^{7}	7

Third round
1	(France) M Pierce	6	6
(Israel) A Smashnova	1	2
(Australia) J Dokic	6	6
7	(United States) A Frazier	2	2

Quarterfinals
1	(France) M Pierce	6	6
(Australia) J Dokic	3	1

==== Section 2 ====
First round
(Canada) M Drake	3	3
(United States) E deLone	6	6
(Colombia) F Zuluaga	4	3
Q	(United States) H Parkinson	6	6
(United States) L Osterloh	3	6	1
9	(Russia) E Likhovtseva	6	4	6
11	(Romania) R Dragomir	7^{7}	7^{7}
(Switzerland) E Gagliardi	6^{2}	6^{3}
(United States) A Stevenson	4	3
(Russia) A Myskina	6	6
(United States) T Snyder	7^{7}	6
(Slovenia) T Pisnik	6^{1}	3

Second round
3	(United States) M Seles	6	6
(United States) E deLone	0	0
Q	(United States) H Parkinson	0	0
9	(Russia) E Likhovtseva	6	6
11	(Romania) R Dragomir	3	7	6
(Russia) A Myskina	6	5	3
(United States) T Snyder	6	2	1
6	(Russia) A Kournikova	4	6	6

Third round
3	(United States) M Seles	6	2	7^{7}
9	(Russia) E Likhovtseva	4	6	6^{5}
11	(Romania) R Dragomir	6^{2}	6	6
6	(Russia) A Kournikova	7^{7}	3	3

Quarterfinals
3	(United States) M Seles	6	6
11	(Romania) R Dragomir	1	1

=== Bottom half ===
==== Section 3 ====
First round
(Russia) A Jidkova	3	6	7
(South Africa) J Kruger	6	2	5
WC	(Croatia) I Majoli	1	7^{7}	7
(United States) M Shaughnessy	6	6^{3}	5
(Netherlands) S Noorlander	2	3
15	(Russia) E Dementieva	6	6
13	(Switzerland) P Schnyder	6	6
(Canada) S Jeyaseelan	3	1
(Italy) R Grande	1	r
WC	(United States) M Tu	6
(Slovakia) H Nagyová	6^{2}	4
(Argentina) P Suárez	7^{7}	6

Second round
8	(South Africa) A Coetzer	6	3	6
(Russia) A Jidkova	2	6	1
WC	(Croatia) I Majoli	1	1
15	(Russia) E Dementieva	6	6
13	(Switzerland) P Schnyder	6	6
WC	(United States) M Tu	4	0
(Argentina) P Suárez	3	5
4	(Spain) A Sánchez Vicario	6	7

Third round
8	(South Africa) A Coetzer	6	6
15	(Russia) E Dementieva	2	4
13	(Switzerland) P Schnyder	5	1
4	(Spain) A Sánchez Vicario	7	6

Quarterfinals
8	(South Africa) A Coetzer	6^{12}	6	3
4	(Spain) A Sánchez Vicario	7^{14}	3	6

==== Section 4 ====
First round
Q	(Germany) M Weingärtner	2	5
(Canada) J Nejedly	6	7
Q	(United States) M Washington	0	5
Q	(Spain) V Ruano Pascual	6	7
(Sweden) Å Carlsson	4	2
12	(United States) L Raymond	6	6
10	(Croatia) S Talaja	6^{5}	1
(United States) K Brandi	7^{7}	6
(Argentina) F Labat	6	6
(Bulgaria) M Maleeva	3	4
(Spain) M Serna	7	6
WC	(United States) J Hopkins	5	4

Second round
5	(Austria) B Schett	6	6^{4}	2
(Canada) J Nejedly	3	7^{7}	6
Q	(Spain) V Ruano Pascual	5	6	2
12	(United States) L Raymond	7	3	6
(United States) K Brandi	4	2
(Argentina) F Labat	6	6
(Spain) M Serna	6^{7}	1
2	(Spain) C Martínez	7^{9}	6

Third round
(Canada) J Nejedly	6	6
12	(United States) L Raymond	2	3
(Argentina) F Labat	3	0
2	(Spain) C Martínez	6	6

Quarterfinals
(Canada) J Nejedly	2	1
2	(Spain) C Martínez	6	6
