= 2001 Family Circle Cup – Doubles =

Doubles
- 2001 Family Circle Cup

Final
- Champions: (United States) Lisa Raymond (Australia) Rennae Stubbs
- Runners-up: (Spain) Virginia Ruano Pascual (Argentina) Paola Suárez
- Score: 5–7, 7–6^{(7–5)}, 6–3

Details
- Seeds: 8

Events
Singles	Doubles
← 2000 ·	Family Circle Cup	· 2002 →

Virginia Ruano Pascual and Paola Suárez were the defending champions but lost in the final 5–7, 7–6^{(7–5)}, 6–3 against Lisa Raymond and Rennae Stubbs.

== Seeds ==
Champion seeds are indicated in bold text while text in italics indicates the round in which those seeds were eliminated. The top four seeded teams received byes into the second round.

1. (United States) **Lisa Raymond** / (Australia) **Rennae Stubbs (champions)**
2. (Spain) Virginia Ruano Pascual / (Argentina) Paola Suárez (final)
3. (Sweden) Åsa Carlsson / (United States) Kimberly Po (second round)
4. (Russia) Elena Likhovtseva / (Australia) Nicole Pratt (quarterfinals)
5. (United States) Nicole Arendt / (Netherlands) Caroline Vis (semifinals)
6. (South Africa) Liezel Huber / (Argentina) Laura Montalvo (quarterfinals)
7. (South Africa) Amanda Coetzer / (United States) Lori McNeil (quarterfinals)
8. (Spain) Conchita Martínez / (Argentina) Patricia Tarabini (first round)

== Draw ==
=== Key ===
- Q = Qualifier
- WC = Wild card
- LL = Lucky loser
- Alt = Alternate
- SE = Special exempt
- PR = Protected ranking
- ITF = ITF entry
- JE = Junior exempt
- w/o = Walkover
- r = Retired
- d = Defaulted
- SR = Special ranking

=== Final ===
Final
1	(United States) **Lisa Raymond** (Australia) **Rennae Stubbs**	5	**7^{7}**	**6**
2	(Spain) Virginia Ruano Pascual (Argentina) Paola Suárez	**7**	6^{5}	3

=== Top half ===
First round
(United States) L Osterloh (United States) A Stevenson	5	5
(Japan) **S Asagoe** (Japan) **R Hiraki**	**7**	**7**
(Bulgaria) S Krivencheva (Austria) M Maruska	5	3
(Germany) **B Lamade** (Switzerland) **P Schnyder**	**7**	**6**
(United States) E deLone (Spain) G León García	3	4
6	(South Africa) **L Huber** (Argentina) **L Montalvo**	**6**	**6**
(United States) **J Capriati** (Spain) **A Sánchez-Vicario**	**7**	**6**
(Germany) A Glass (Croatia) I Majoli	5	0
Q	(Russia) T Panova (Canada) M-È Pelletier	3	3
(South Africa) **M de Swardt** (United States) **D Graham**	**6**	**6**
(United States) A Frazier (United States) K Schlukebir	4	2
7	(South Africa) **A Coetzer** (United States) **L McNeil**	**6**	**6**

Second round
1	(United States) **L Raymond** (Australia) **R Stubbs**	**7^{7}**	**6**
(Japan) S Asagoe (Japan) R Hiraki	6^{5}	4
(Germany) B Lamade (Switzerland) P Schnyder	**6**	2	4
6	(South Africa) **L Huber** (Argentina) **L Montalvo**	4	**6**	**6**
3	(Sweden) Å Carlsson (United States) K Po	6^{4}	6^{5}
(United States) **J Capriati** (Spain) **A Sánchez-Vicario**	**7^{7}**	**7^{7}**
(South Africa) M de Swardt (United States) D Graham	4	3
7	(South Africa) **A Coetzer** (United States) **L McNeil**	**6**	**6**

Quarterfinals
1	(United States) **L Raymond** (Australia) **R Stubbs**	2	**7^{8}**	**6**
6	(South Africa) L Huber (Argentina) L Montalvo	**6**	6^{6}	2
(United States) **J Capriati** (Spain) **A Sánchez-Vicario**	**6**	**6**
7	(South Africa) A Coetzer (United States) L McNeil	3	0

Semifinals
1	(United States) **L Raymond** (Australia) **R Stubbs**	**6**	**7^{7}**
(United States) J Capriati (Spain) A Sánchez-Vicario	3	6^{4}

=== Bottom half ===
First round
5	(United States) **N Arendt** (Netherlands) **C Vis**	**6**	**6**
(United States) J Craybas (United States) S Taylor	4	2
WC	(Canada) M Drake (Germany) M Weingärtner	0	4
(Federal Republic of Yugoslavia) **J Dokić** (United States) **C Morariu**	**6**	**6**
(United States) K Brandi (Croatia) M Lučić	1	3
(Canada) **S Jeyaseelan** (Australia) **R McQuillan**	**6**	**6**
8	(Spain) C Martínez (Argentina) P Tarabini	2	**6**	3
(Canada) **R Kolbovic** (United States) **M Tu**	**6**	0	**6**
(France) **N Dechy** (United States) **C Rubin**	**7^{7}**	4	**6**
(Argentina) M Díaz Oliva (Argentina) M E Salerni	6^{2}	**6**	4
(Romania) **R Dragomir Ilie** (Italy) **S Farina Elia**	**6**	**6**
(United States) S Reeves (South Africa) J Steck	2	0

Second round
5	(United States) **N Arendt** (Netherlands) **C Vis**	**7^{7}**	**7^{7}**
(Federal Republic of Yugoslavia) J Dokić (United States) C Morariu	6^{4}	6^{3}
(Canada) S Jeyaseelan (Australia) R McQuillan	**6**	4	2
4	(Russia) **E Likhovtseva** (Australia) **N Pratt**	3	**6**	**6**
(Canada) **R Kolbovic** (United States) **M Tu**	**w/o**
(France) N Dechy (United States) C Rubin
(Romania) R Dragomir Ilie (Italy) S Farina Elia	6^{2}	**6**	1
2	(Spain) **V Ruano Pascual** (Argentina) **P Suárez**	**7^{7}**	3	**6**

Quarterfinals
5	(United States) **N Arendt** (Netherlands) **C Vis**	**6**	**6**
4	(Russia) E Likhovtseva (Australia) N Pratt	4	2
(Canada) R Kolbovic (United States) M Tu	0	1
2	(Spain) **V Ruano Pascual** (Argentina) **P Suárez**	**6**	**6**

Semifinals
5	(United States) N Arendt (Netherlands) C Vis	1	5
2	(Spain) **V Ruano Pascual** (Argentina) **P Suárez**	**6**	**7**
