= Virginia Ruano Pascual =

Spanish tennis player (born 1973)

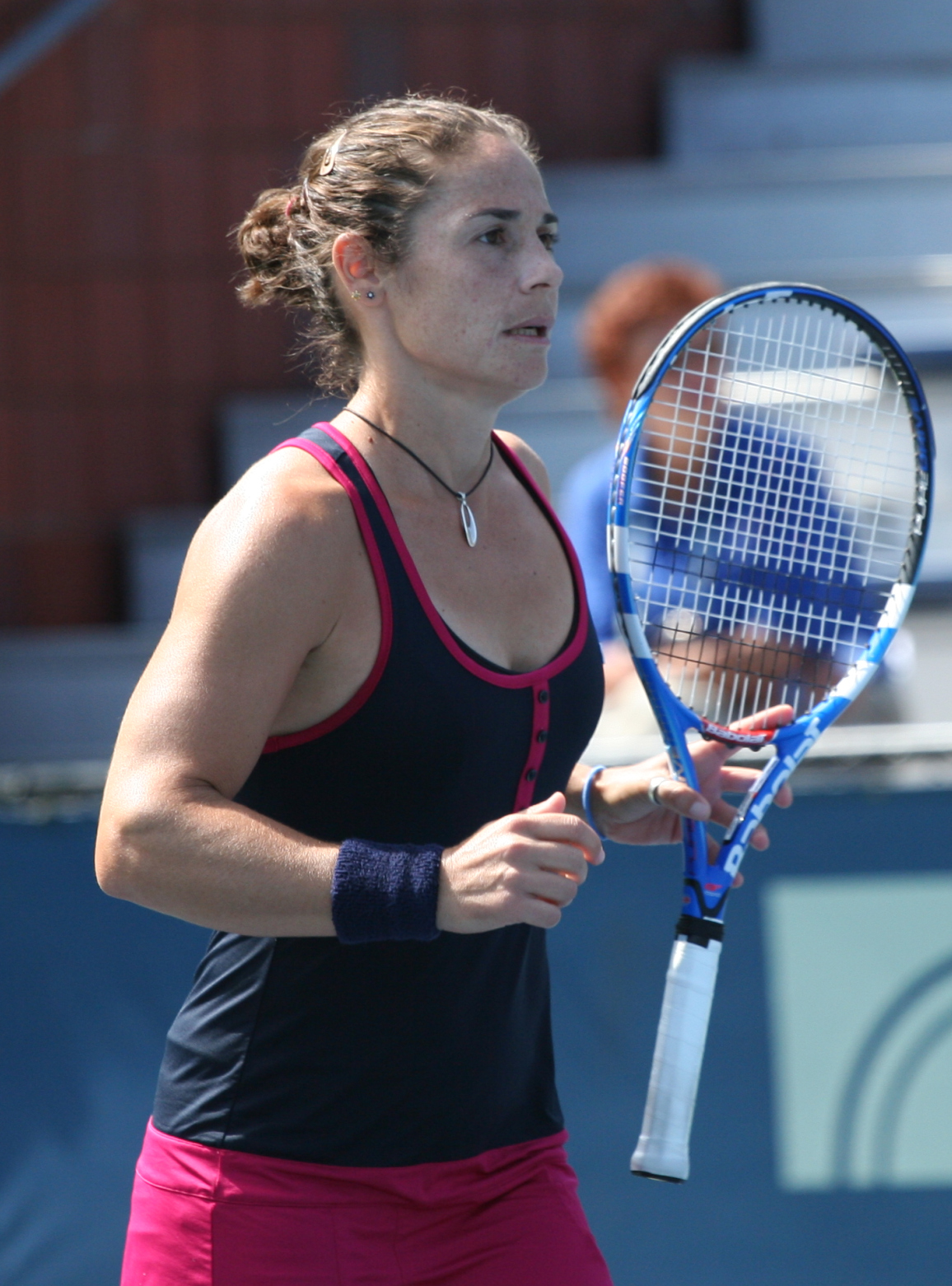
- At the 2009 US Open
- Country (sports): Spain
- Residence: Madrid
- Born: 21 September 1973 (age 53) Madrid
- Height: 1.69 m (5 ft 7 in)
- Turned pro: January 1992
- Retired: 2010
- Plays: Right-handed (one-handed backhand)
- Prize money: US$ 6,076,081

Singles
- Career record: 395–353
- Career titles: 3
- Highest ranking: No. 28 (12 April 1999)

Grand Slam singles results
- Australian Open: QF (2003)
- French Open: QF (1995)
- Wimbledon: 4R (1998)
- US Open: 3R (1998, 1999, 2001)

Doubles
- Career record: 596–272
- Career titles: 43
- Highest ranking: No. 1 (8 September 2003)

Grand Slam doubles results
- Australian Open: W (2004)
- French Open: W (2001, 2002, 2004, 2005, 2008, 2009)
- Wimbledon: F (2002, 2003, 2006)
- US Open: W (2002, 2003, 2004)

Other doubles tournaments
- Tour Finals: W (2003)

Mixed doubles
- Career titles: 1

Grand Slam mixed doubles results
- Australian Open: QF (2004)
- French Open: W (2001)
- Wimbledon: SF (2009)
- US Open: QF (2003)
Medal record
Representing Spain
Olympic Games
Silver medal – second place	2004 Athens	Doubles
Silver medal – second place	2008 Beijing	Doubles
Mediterranean Games
Silver medal – second place	1993 Languedoc-Roussillon	Singles
Bronze medal – third place	1993 Languedoc-Roussillon	Doubles

Virginia Ruano Pascual (Spanish pronunciation: [biɾˈxinja ˈrwano pasˈkwal]; born 21 September 1973) is a Spanish former professional tennis player. She had moderate success in singles, winning three WTA Tour titles as well as reaching two major quarterfinals and a top-30 ranking, but she had been far more successful in doubles.

She won 43 career doubles titles, including eleven at Grand Slam tournaments: ten in women's doubles (eight partnering Paola Suárez, and two partnering Anabel Medina Garrigues) and one in mixed doubles (partnering Tomás Carbonell). Between 2002 and 2004, along with Suárez, she reached nine consecutive Grand Slam tournament finals (won five) and they reached at least the semifinals of the last twelve Grand Slam tournaments they played. Their winning run came to an end when they lost in the 2009 Wimbledon semifinals. Alongside Suarez, the pair was named as a ITF World Champions for the three consecutive years in a row (2002-2004).

== Personal life ==
Her father, Juan Manuel Ruano, worked for Iberia Airlines; her mother, Virginia Pascual, is a housewife. She has a brother, Juan Ramón, a tennis pro who also serves as her coach, and a sister, Marbella. Initially, Virginia hyphenated her family names ("Ruano-Pascual") but has omitted the hyphen since 1998.

== Career ==
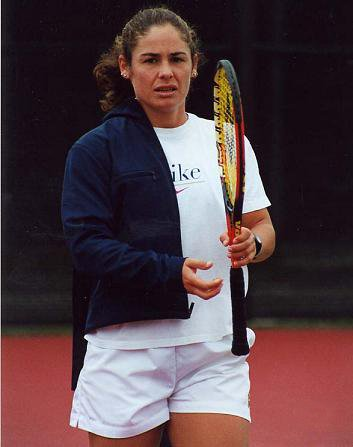
Ruano Pascual in 2003

=== Women's doubles ===
==== Majors ====
Ruano Pascual was very successful at the Grand Slam tournaments. In total, she won ten titles in doubles events. She lifted the French Open trophy six times. The first one she won in 2001 along with Paola Suárez, with whom she one year ago played final but they lost. In 2002, she defended her title again with Suárez. The following year, she also reached final but finished as a runner-up, again with Suárez. The pair then triumphed again in 2004 and 2005. After three years without reaching final at the French Open, in 2008 she won another title but this time with Anabel Medina Garrigues. They successfully defended their title in 2009.

French Open is not the only major she has won. In 2004, with Suarez, she won her first and only Australian Open title. At the US Open, she collected three titles. Her first final and also title was in 2002 with Suarez. After that, the pair defended their title in the following two years (2003 and 2004). Despite not winning any title at the Wimbledon Championships, she finished as a runner-up three times (2002, 2003 and 2006). Along with her success in women's doubles, she also won one mixed doubles title at the 2001 French Open. Alongside Suárez, the pair was named as a ITF World Champions for three consecutive years in-a-row (2002-2004).

==== Other significant results ====
Along with great performances at the highest-level tournaments (Grand Slams), she had success at the WTA Premier Mandatory & 5 tournaments as well. It all started with the title at the Italian Open in 1998, that also was her first either quarterfinal, semifinal or final on this level. In 2000, she did well at the Charleston Open, winning her second level title. Two years later, she went a step further, winning two titles (Italian Open & Canadian Open). After winning per two titles in 2003 and 2004, in 2005 she won three titles to reach the total of 11 titles from this level. Her last title was the 2005 San Diego Open. At most of the level tournaments, she had at least quarterfinal with one exception, the China Open that was reclassified as WTA Premier Mandatory tournament just two years before Pascual's retirement. She also has one year-end championships title at the 2003 WTA Tour Championships.

==== Ranking and national contribution ====
Being one of the most successful doubles players, she did not leave her mark only on the Grand Slams & WTA Premier Mandatory/5 tournaments. She also is former world No. 1 that she achieved in September 2003. She finished 2004 as the top ranked player. In 2005, she also spent some weeks at the highest position, but finished the year as world No. 4. Until her retirement in 2010, she spent at least one week in the top 10 in each season. She also left her mark playing for Spain at the national competitions. At the Summer Olympics, she won two silver medals, in 2004 with Conchita Martínez and in 2008 with Medina Garrigues.

=== Singles ===
Along with her doubles success, she had a solid singles career as well. In April 1999, she reached 28th place. She has won three WTA Tour titles. At the majors, she reached two quarterfinals; at the French Open in 1995 and Australian Open in 2003.

== Performance timelines ==
Key
W	F	SF	QF	#R	RR	Q#	P#	DNQ	A	Z#	PO	G	S	B	NMS	NTI	P	NH

(W) winner; (F) finalist; (SF) semifinalist; (QF) quarterfinalist; (#R) rounds 4, 3, 2, 1; (RR) round-robin stage; (Q#) qualification round; (P#) preliminary round; (DNQ) did not qualify; (A) absent; (Z#) Davis/Fed Cup Zonal Group (with number indication) or (PO) play-off; (G) gold, (S) silver or (B) bronze Olympic/Paralympic medal; (NMS) not a Masters tournament; (NTI) not a Tier I tournament; (P) postponed; (NH) not held; (SR) strike rate (events won / competed); (W–L) win–loss record.
To avoid confusion and double counting, these charts are updated at the conclusion of a tournament or when the player's participation has ended.

Only main-draw results in WTA Tour, Grand Slam tournaments, Fed Cup and Olympic Games are included in win–loss records.

=== Singles ===
Tournament	1990	1991	1992	1993	1994	1995	1996	1997	1998	1999	2000	2001	2002	2003	2004	2005	2006	2007	2008	2009	2010	SR	W–L	Win%
Grand Slam tournaments
Australian Open	A	A	A	A	1R	A	1R	2R	2R	2R	1R	3R	1R	QF	2R	1R	4R	2R	3R	2R	A	0 / 15	17–15	53%
French Open	A	A	Q2	Q2	Q2	QF	1R	3R	3R	1R	A	2R	2R	1R	3R	2R	1R	Q1	1R	2R	A	0 / 13	14–13	52%
Wimbledon	A	A	A	A	A	1R	1R	2R	4R	1R	A	2R	2R	1R	3R	1R	2R	3R	2R	A	A	0 / 13	12–13	48%
US Open	A	A	1R	1R	A	1R	1R	1R	3R	3R	2R	3R	1R	1R	2R	1R	2R	1R	2R	Q1	A	0 / 16	10–16	38%
Win–loss	0–0	0–0	0–1	0–1	0–1	4–3	0–4	4–4	8–4	3–4	1–2	6–4	2–4	4–4	6–4	1–4	5–4	3–3	4–4	2–2	0–0	0 / 57	53–57	48%
National representation
Summer Olympics	NH		A	NH			2R	NH			A	NH			A	NH			A	NH		0 / 1	1–1	50%
Premier Mandatory & 5 + former
Indian Wells Open	NMS						A	Q1	A	A	Q1	1R	1R	3R	1R	1R	1R	1R	A	1R	A	0 / 8	2–8	20%
Miami Open	A	A	A	A	A	A	1R	Q3	1R	3R	Q1	2R	1R	1R	1R	2R	1R	A	1R	Q1	A	0 / 10	3–10	23%
Berlin / Madrid Open (Note: In 2009, the German Open was replaced by the Madrid Open. The Premier Mandatory tournaments were reclassified as WTA 1000 tournaments in 2021.)	A	A	A	A	1R	1R	1R	A	A	A	Q1	1R	A	2R	Q2	A	A	2R	Q1	1R	1R	0 / 8	2–8	20%
Italian Open	A	A	A	A	A	2R	2R	Q1	2R	1R	A	A	QF	2R	Q2	1R	A	Q1	2R	A	A	0 / 8	8–8	50%
Canadian Open	A	A	A	A	A	1R	2R	A	2R	Q1	2R	1R	3R	2R	1R	1R	A	Q1	A	A	A	0 / 9	6–9	40%
China Open	NH/NMS																			Q1	A	0 / 0	0–0	–
San Diego Open (former)	NMS														1R	Q2	2R	A	A	NH/NMS		0 / 2	1–2	33%
Charleston Open (former)	A	A	A	1R	A	2R	A	2R	3R	2R	2R	1R	1R	2R	2R	1R	2R	1R	2R	NMS		0 / 14	10–14	42%
Kremlin Cup (former)	NH/NMS							A	A	A	A	A	A	A	Q1	A	A	A	A	NMS		0 / 0	0–0	–
Win–loss	0–0	0–0	0–0	0–1	0–1	2–4	2–4	1–1	4–4	2–3	2–2	1–5	5–5	6–6	1–5	1–5	2–4	1–3	2–3	0–2	0–1	0 / 59	32–59	35%
Career statistics
Tournaments	1	1	4	10	4	13	16	11	17	16	8	18	21	18	16	18	13	14	12	5	2	Career total: 238		
Year-end ranking	301	261	138	125	161	64	87	54	32	85	89	56	65	55	64	106	67	83	105	199		$6,076,080		

=== Doubles ===
Tournament	1990	1991	1992	1993	1994	1995	1996	1997	1998	1999	2000	2001	2002	2003	2004	2005	2006	2007	2008	2009	2010	SR	W–L	Win%
Grand Slam tournaments
Australian Open	A	A	A	A	A	A	A	QF	2R	2R	2R	QF	3R	F	W	1R	QF	1R	SF	3R	3R	1 / 14	31–13	70%
French Open	A	A	1R	2R	2R	A	A	1R	2R	2R	F	W	W	F	W	W	2R	QF	W	W	1R	6 / 17	54–11	83%
Wimbledon	A	A	A	A	A	A	1R	1R	2R	3R	QF	SF	F	F	SF	A	F	3R	3R	SF	2R	0 / 14	37–14	73%
US Open	A	A	2R	A	1R	A	1R	2R	SF	2R	1R	3R	W	W	W	SF	QF	3R	SF	3R	A	3 / 16	41–13	76%
Win–loss	0–0	0–0	1–2	1–1	1–2	0–0	0–2	4–4	7–4	5–4	9–4	15–3	19–2	19–3	22–1	10–2	11–4	6–4	16–3	14–3	3–3	10 / 61	163–51	76%
Year-end championships
WTA Tour Championships	DNQ										1R	SF	1R	W	1R	1R	DNQ		1R	DNQ		1 / 7	3–6	33%
National representation
Summer Olympics	NH		A	NH			A	NH			A	NH			S	NH			S	NH		0 / 2	8–2	80%
Premier Mandatory & 5 + former
Dubai / Qatar Open (Note: The first Premier 5 event of the year has switched back and forth between the Dubai Tennis Championships and the Qatar Ladies Open since 2009. Dubai was classified as a Premier 5 event from 2009 to 2011 before being succeeded by Doha for the 2012–2014 period. In 2015, Dubai regained its Premier 5 status while Doha was demoted to Premier status. The Premier 5 tournaments were reclassified as WTA 1000 tournaments in 2021.)	NH/NMS																		QF	A	1R	0 / 2	2–2	50%
Indian Wells Open	NMS						A	2R	A	A	2R	F	SF	SF	W	W	F	QF	A	1R	1R	0 / 11	27–9	75%
Miami Open	A	A	A	A	A	A	A	1R	2R	2R	3R	1R	F	QF	QF	SF	2R	1R	1R	QF	1R	0 / 14	16–14	53%
Berlin / Madrid Open	A	A	A	A	2R	A	2R	A	A	A	A	QF	A	W	SF	A	A	1R	1R	2R	QF	0 / 9	11–8	58%
Italian Open	A	A	A	A	A	1R	1R	A	W	QF	A	A	W	QF	F	A (Note: Was part of the draw but did not play any match.)	1R	1R	QF	1R	A	0 / 11	16–9	64%
Canadian Open	A	A	A	A	A	1R	2R	A	1R	2R	2R	1R	W	2R	SF	F	1R	1R	A	2R	A	0 / 13	11–12	48%
Cincinnati Open	NH/NMS																			SF	A	0 / 1	2–1	67%
Pan Pacific Open	NMS			A	A	A	A	A	A	A	A	A	A	A	A	A	A	A	A	QF	A	0 / 1	1–1	50%
China Open	NH/NMS																			2R	A	0 / 1	0–1	0%
San Diego Open (former)	NMS														F	W	QF	A	A	NH/NMS		0 / 3	9–2	82%
Charleston Open (former)	A	A	A	1R	A	1R	A	1R	2R	2R	W	F	2R	W	W	W	F	1R	2R	NMS		0 / 14	25–10	71%
Kremlin Cup (former)	NH/NMS							A	A	A	A	A	A	A	F	A	A	A	A	NMS		0 / 1	3–1	75%
Zurich Open (former)	NMS			A	A	A	A	A	A	A	A	A	1R	F	F	QF	1R	A	NH/NMS			0 / 5	7–5	58%
Win–loss	0–0	0–0	0–0	0–1	1–1	0–3	2–3	1–3	7–3	4–4	7–3	8–5	14–4	17–5	26–7	20–3	9–7	2–6	5–5	5–8	2–4	11 / 86	130–75	63%
Career statistics
Tournaments	1	3	7	8	5	6	9	13	14	17	16	19	21	18	19	20	19	17	20	17	12	Career total: 281		
Year-end ranking	187	111	97	202	145	376	115	90	28	44	10	8	2	2	1	4	10	30	5	10	55			

== Grand Slam tournament finals ==
=== Doubles: 16 (10 titles, 6 runner-ups) ===
Result	Year	Championship	Surface	Partner	Opponents	Score
Loss	2000	French Open	Clay	(Argentina) Paola Suárez	(Switzerland) Martina Hingis (France) Mary Pierce	2–6, 4–6
Win	2001	French Open	Clay	(Argentina) Paola Suárez	(Federal Republic of Yugoslavia) Jelena Dokic (Spain) Conchita Martínez	6–2, 6–1
Win	2002	French Open (2)	Clay	(Argentina) Paola Suárez	(United States) Lisa Raymond (Australia) Rennae Stubbs	6–4, 6–2
Loss	2002	Wimbledon	Grass	(Argentina) Paola Suárez	(United States) Serena Williams (United States) Venus Williams	2–6, 5–7
Win	2002	US Open	Hard	(Argentina) Paola Suárez	(Russia) Elena Dementieva (Slovakia) Janette Husárová	6–2, 6–1
Loss	2003	Australian Open	Hard	(Argentina) Paola Suárez	(United States) Serena Williams (United States) Venus Williams	6–4, 4–6, 3–6
Loss	2003	French Open	Clay	(Argentina) Paola Suárez	(Belgium) Kim Clijsters (Japan) Ai Sugiyama	7–6^{(5)}, 2–6, 7–9
Loss	2003	Wimbledon	Grass	(Argentina) Paola Suárez	(Belgium) Kim Clijsters (Japan) Ai Sugiyama	4–6, 4–6
Win	2003	US Open (2)	Hard	(Argentina) Paola Suárez	(Russia) Svetlana Kuznetsova (United States) Martina Navratilova	6–2, 6–3
Win	2004	Australian Open	Hard	(Argentina) Paola Suárez	(Russia) Svetlana Kuznetsova (Russia) Elena Likhovtseva	6–4, 6–3
Win	2004	French Open (3)	Clay	(Argentina) Paola Suárez	(Russia) Svetlana Kuznetsova (Russia) Elena Likhovtseva	6–0, 6–3
Win	2004	US Open (3)	Hard	(Argentina) Paola Suárez	(Russia) Svetlana Kuznetsova (Russia) Elena Likhovtseva	6–4, 7–5
Win	2005	French Open (4)	Clay	(Argentina) Paola Suárez	(Zimbabwe) Cara Black (South Africa) Liezel Huber	4–6, 6–3, 6–3
Loss	2006	Wimbledon	Grass	(Argentina) Paola Suárez	(China) Yan Zi (China) Zheng Jie	3–6, 6–3, 2–6
Win	2008	French Open (5)	Clay	(Spain) Anabel Medina Garrigues	(Australia) Casey Dellacqua (Italy) Francesca Schiavone	2–6, 7–5, 6–4
Win	2009	French Open (6)	Clay	(Spain) Anabel Medina Garrigues	(Belarus) Victoria Azarenka (Russia) Elena Vesnina	6–1, 6–1

=== Mixed doubles: 1 (title) ===
Result	Year	Championship	Surface	Partner	Opponents	Score
Win	2001	French Open	Clay	(Spain) Tomás Carbonell	(Brazil) Jaime Oncins (Argentina) Paola Suárez	7–5, 6–3

== Other significant finals ==
=== WTA Tour Championships ===
==== Doubles: 1 (title) ====
Result	Year	Tournament	Surface	Partner	Opponents	Score
Win	2003	WTA Tour Championships, Los Angeles	Hard (i)	(Argentina) Paola Suárez	(Belgium) Kim Clijsters (Japan) Ai Sugiyama	6–4, 3–6, 6–3

=== Summer Olympics ===
==== Doubles: 2 (2 silver medals) ====
Result	Year	Tournament	Surface	Partner	Opponents	Score
Silver	2004	Summer Olympics, Athens	Hard	(Spain) Conchita Martínez	(China) Sun Tiantian (China) Li Ting	3–6, 3–6
Silver	2008	Summer Olympics, Beijing	Hard	(Spain) Anabel Medina Garrigues	(United States) Serena Williams (United States) Venus Williams	2–6, 0–6

=== Premier Mandatory & 5 ===
==== Doubles: 22 (11 titles, 11 runner-ups) ====
Result	Year	Tournament	Surface	Partner	Opponents	Score
Win	1998	Italian Open	Clay	(Argentina) Paola Suárez	(South Africa) Amanda Coetzer (Spain) Arantxa Sánchez Vicario	7–6^{(1)}, 6–4
Win	2000	Charleston Open	Clay	(Argentina) Paola Suárez	(Spain) Conchita Martínez (Argentina) Patricia Tarabini	7–5, 6–3
Loss	2001	Indian Wells Open	Hard	(Argentina) Paola Suárez	(United States) Nicole Arendt (Japan) Ai Sugiyama	4–6, 4–6
Loss	2001	Charleston Open	Clay	(Argentina) Paola Suárez	(United States) Lisa Raymond (Australia) Rennae Stubbs	7–5, 6–7^{(5)}, 3–6
Loss	2002	Miami Open	Hard	(Argentina) Paola Suárez	(United States) Lisa Raymond (Australia) Rennae Stubbs	6–7^{(4)}, 7–6^{(4)}, 3–6
Win	2002	Italian Open (2)	Clay	(Argentina) Paola Suárez	(Spain) Conchita Martínez (Argentina) Patricia Tarabini	6–3, 6–4
Win	2002	Canadian Open	Hard	(Argentina) Paola Suárez	(Japan) Rika Fujiwara (Japan) Ai Sugiyama	6–4, 7–6^{(4)}
Win	2003	Charleston Open (2)	Clay	(Argentina) Paola Suárez	(Slovakia) Janette Husárová (Spain) Conchita Martínez	6–0, 6–3
Win	2003	German Open	Clay	(Argentina) Paola Suárez	(Belgium) Kim Clijsters (Japan) Ai Sugiyama	6–3, 4–6, 6–4
Loss	2003	Zurich Open	Hard (i)	(Argentina) Paola Suárez	(Belgium) Kim Clijsters (Japan) Ai Sugiyama	6–7^{(3)}, 2–6
Win	2004	Indian Wells Open	Hard	(Argentina) Paola Suárez	(Russia) Svetlana Kuznetsova (Russia) Elena Likhovtseva	6–1, 6–2
Win	2004	Charleston Open (3)	Clay	(Argentina) Paola Suárez	(United States) Martina Navratilova (United States) Lisa Raymond	6–4, 6–1
Loss	2004	Italian Open	Clay	(Argentina) Paola Suárez	(Russia) Nadia Petrova (United States) Meghann Shaughnessy	6–2, 3–6, 3–6
Loss	2004	San Diego Open	Hard	(Argentina) Paola Suárez	(Zimbabwe) Cara Black (Australia) Rennae Stubbs	4–6, 6–1, 6–4
Loss	2004	Kremlin Cup	Carpet (i)	(Argentina) Paola Suárez	(Russia) Anastasia Myskina (Russia) Vera Zvonareva	3–6, 6–4, 2–6
Loss	2004	Zurich Open	Hard (i)	(Argentina) Paola Suárez	(Zimbabwe) Cara Black (Australia) Rennae Stubbs	4–6, 4–6
Win	2005	Indian Wells Open (2)	Hard	(Argentina) Paola Suárez	(Russia) Nadia Petrova (United States) Meghann Shaughnessy	7–6^{(3)}, 6–1
Win	2005	Charleston Open (4)	Clay	(Spain) Conchita Martínez	(Czech Republic) Iveta Benešová (Czech Republic) Květa Peschke	6–1, 6–4
Win	2005	San Diego Open	Hard	(Spain) Conchita Martínez	(Slovakia) Daniela Hantuchová (Japan) Ai Sugiyama	6–7^{(7)}, 6–1, 7–5
Loss	2005	Canadian Open	Hard	(Spain) Conchita Martínez	(Germany) Anna-Lena Grönefeld (United States) Martina Navratilova	7–5, 3–6, 4–6
Loss	2006	Indian Wells Open	Hard	(United States) Meghann Shaughnessy	(United States) Lisa Raymond (Australia) Samantha Stosur	2–6, 5–7
Loss	2006	Charleston Open	Clay	(United States) Meghann Shaughnessy	(United States) Lisa Raymond (Australia) Samantha Stosur	6–3, 1–6, 1–6

== WTA Tour finals ==
=== Singles: 3 (3 titles) ===
Legend Grand Slam Premier Mandatory & 5 Premier International (3–0)	Finals by surface Hard (1–0) Clay (2–0) Grass Carpet

Result	W–L	Date	Tournament	Tier	Surface	Opponent	Score
Win	1–0	May 1997	Welsh International Open, UK	Tier IV (Note: Includes WTA Premier and WTA International tournaments. The WTA Tier II tournaments were reclassified as WTA Premier tournaments in 2009, while the WTA Tier III tournaments, WTA Tier IV tournaments and WTA Tier V tournaments were reclassified as WTA International tournaments the same year .)	Clay	(France) Alexia Dechaume-Balleret	6–1, 3–6, 6–2
Win	2–0	Apr 1998	Budapest Grand Prix, Hungary	Tier IV	Clay	(Italy) Silvia Farina Elia	6–4, 4–6, 6–3
Win	3–0	Oct 2003	Tashkent Open, Uzbekistan	Tier IV	Hard	(Japan) Saori Obata	6–2, 7–6^{(2)}

=== Doubles: 78 (43 titles, 35 runner-ups) ===
Legend Grand Slam (10–6) Summer Olympics (0–2) Tour Championships (1–0) Premier Mandatory & 5 (11–11) Premier (6–6) International (15–10)	Finals by surface Hard (21–18) Clay (22–11) Grass (0–5) Carpet (0–1)

Result	W–L	Date	Tournament	Tier	Surface	Partner	Opponents	Score
Win	1–0	Jan 1998	Hobart International, Australia	Tier IV	Hard	(Argentina) Paola Suárez	(France) Julie Halard-Decugis (Slovakia) Janette Husárová	7–6^{(6)}, 6–3
Win	2–0	Apr 1998	Budapest Grand Prix, Hungary	Tier IV	Clay	(Argentina) Paola Suárez	(Romania) Cătălina Cristea (Argentina) Laura Montalvo	4–6, 6–1, 6–1
Win	3–0	May 1998	Italian Open	Tier I (Note: THe WTA Tier I tournaments were reclassified as Premier Mandatory & 5 in 2009.)	Clay	(Argentina) Paola Suárez	(South Africa) Amanda Coetzer (Spain) Arantxa Sánchez Vicario	7–6^{(1)}, 6–4
Loss	3–1	Apr 1999	Budapest Grand Prix, Hungary	Tier IVa	Clay	(Argentina) Laura Montalvo	(Russia) Evgenia Kulikovskaya (Federal Republic of Yugoslavia) Sandra Načuk	3–6, 4–6
Win	4–1	May 1999	Madrid Open, Spain	Tier III	Clay	(Argentina) Paola Suárez	(Argentina) María Fernanda Landa (Germany) Marlene Weingärtner	6–2, 0–6, 6–0
Win	5–1	Apr 2000	Charleston Open, United States	Tier I	Clay	(Argentina) Paola Suárez	(Spain) Conchita Martínez (Argentina) Patricia Tarabini	7–5, 6–3
Loss	5–2	Jun 2000	French Open	Grand Slam	Clay	(Argentina) Paola Suárez	(Switzerland) Martina Hingis (France) Mary Pierce	2–6, 4–6
Loss	5–3	Jul 2000	Palermo Ladies Open, Italy	Tier IV	Clay	(Romania) Ruxandra Dragomir	(Italy) Silvia Farina Elia (Italy) Rita Grande	4–6, 6–0, 6–7^{(6)}
Win	6–3	Jul 2000	Warsaw Open, Poland	Tier III	Clay	(Argentina) Paola Suárez	(Sweden) Åsa Carlsson (Italy) Rita Grande	7–5, 6–1
Loss	6–4	Aug 2000	Connecticut Open, U.S.	Tier II	Hard	(Argentina) Paola Suárez	(France) Julie Halard-Decugis (Japan) Ai Sugiyama	4–6, 7–5, 2–6
Loss	6–5	Jan 2001	Hobart International, Australia	Tier V	Hard	(Romania) Ruxandra Dragomir	(Russia) Elena Likhovtseva (Zimbabwe) Cara Black	4–6, 1–6
Loss	6–6	Mar 2001	Mexican Open	Tier III	Clay	(Argentina) Paola Suárez	(Spain) Anabel Medina Garrigues (Spain) María José Martínez Sánchez	4–6, 7–6^{(5)}, 5–7
Loss	6–7	Mar 2001	Indian Wells Open, United States	Tier I	Hard	(Argentina) Paola Suárez	(United States) Nicole Arendt (Japan) Ai Sugiyama	4–6, 4–6
Loss	6–8	Apr 2001	Charleston Open, United States	Tier I	Clay	(Argentina) Paola Suárez	(United States) Lisa Raymond (Australia) Rennae Stubbs	7–5, 6–7^{(5)}, 3–6
Win	7–8	May 2001	Belgian Open	Tier V	Clay	(Belgium) Els Callens	(Netherlands) Kristie Boogert (Netherlands) Miriam Oremans	6–3, 3–6, 6–4
Win	8–8	May 2001	Madrid Open, Spain (2)	Tier III	Clay	(Argentina) Paola Suárez	(United States) Lisa Raymond (Australia) Rennae Stubbs	7–5, 2–6, 7–6^{(4)}
Win	9–8	Jun 2001	French Open	Grand Slam	Clay	(Argentina) Paola Suárez	(Federal Republic of Yugoslavia) Jelena Dokic (Spain) Conchita Martínez	6–2, 6–1
Win	10–8	Jul 2001	WTA Knokke-Heist, Belgium	Tier IV	Clay	(Spain) Magüi Serna	(Romania) Ruxandra Dragomir Ilie (Romania) Andreea Vanc	6–4, 6–3
Win	11–8	Feb 2002	Copa Colsanitas, Colombia	Tier III	Clay	(Argentina) Paola Suárez	(Slovenia) Tina Križan (Slovenia) Katarina Srebotnik	6–2, 6–1
Win	12–8	Mar 2002	Mexican Open	Tier III	Clay	(Argentina) Paola Suárez	(Slovenia) Tina Križan (Slovenia) Katarina Srebotnik	7–5, 6–1
Loss	12–9	Apr 2002	Miami Open, United States	Tier I	Hard	(Argentina) Paola Suárez	(United States) Lisa Raymond (Australia) Rennae Stubbs	6–7^{(4)}, 7–6^{(4)}, 3–6
Win	13–9	May 2002	Italian Open (2)	Tier I	Clay	(Argentina) Paola Suárez	(Spain) Conchita Martínez (Argentina) Patricia Tarabini	6–3, 6–4
Win	14–9	Jun 2002	French Open (2)	Grand Slam	Clay	(Argentina) Paola Suárez	(United States) Lisa Raymond (Australia) Rennae Stubbs	6–4, 6–2
Loss	14–10	Jul 2002	Wimbledon, UK	Grand Slam	Grass	(Argentina) Paola Suárez	(United States) Serena Williams (United States) Venus Williams	2–6, 5–7
Win	15–10	Aug 2002	Canadian Open	Tier I	Hard	(Argentina) Paola Suárez	(Japan) Rika Fujiwara (Japan) Ai Sugiyama	6–4, 7–6^{(4)}
Win	16–10	Sep 2002	US Open	Grand Slam	Hard	(Argentina) Paola Suárez	(Russia) Elena Dementieva (Slovakia) Janette Husárová	6–2, 6–1
Win	17–10	Sep 2002	Brasil Open	Tier II	Hard	(Argentina) Paola Suárez	(France) Émilie Loit (Paraguay) Rossana de los Ríos	6–4, 6–1
Win	18–10	Sep 2002	Bali International, Indonesia	Tier III	Hard	(Zimbabwe) Cara Black	(Russia) Svetlana Kuznetsova (Spain) Arantxa Sánchez Vicario	6–2, 6–3
Loss	18–11	Jan 2003	Australian Open	Grand Slam	Hard	(Argentina) Paola Suárez	(United States) Serena Williams (United States) Venus Williams	6–4, 4–6, 3–6
Win	19–11	Apr 2003	Charleston Open, United States (2)	Tier I	Clay	(Argentina) Paola Suárez	(Slovakia) Janette Husárová (Spain) Conchita Martínez	6–0, 6–3
Loss	19–12	Apr 2003	Amelia Island Championships, U.S.	Tier II	Clay	(Argentina) Paola Suárez	(United States) Lindsay Davenport (United States) Lisa Raymond	5–7, 2–6
Win	20–12	May 2003	German Open	Tier I	Clay	(Argentina) Paola Suárez	(Belgium) Kim Clijsters (Japan) Ai Sugiyama	6–3, 4–6, 6–4
Loss	20–13	Jun 2003	French Open	Grand Slam	Clay	(Argentina) Paola Suárez	(Belgium) Kim Clijsters (Japan) Ai Sugiyama	7–6^{(5)}, 2–6, 7–9
Loss	20–14	Jul 2003	Wimbledon, UK	Grand Slam	Grass	(Argentina) Paola Suárez	(Belgium) Kim Clijsters (Japan) Ai Sugiyama	4–6, 4–6
Win	21–14	Aug 2003	Connecticut Open, U.S.	Tier II	Hard	(Argentina) Paola Suárez	(Australia) Alicia Molik (Spain) Magüi Serna	7–6^{(6)}, 6–3
Win	22–14	Sep 2003	US Open (2)	Grand Slam	Hard	(Argentina) Paola Suárez	(Russia) Svetlana Kuznetsova (United States) Martina Navratilova	6–2, 6–3
Loss	22–15	Oct 2003	Zurich Open, Switzerland	Tier I	Hard (i)	(Argentina) Paola Suárez	(Belgium) Kim Clijsters (Japan) Ai Sugiyama	6–7^{(3)}, 2–6
Win	23–15	Nov 2003	Tour Championships, Los Angeles	Finals	Hard (i)	(Argentina) Paola Suárez	(Belgium) Kim Clijsters (Japan) Ai Sugiyama	6–4, 3–6, 6–3
Loss	23–16	Jan 2004	Auckland Open, New Zealand	Tier IV	Hard	(Argentina) Paola Suárez	(Bosnia and Herzegovina) Mervana Jugić-Salkić (Croatia) Jelena Kostanić Tošić	6–7^{(6)}, 6–3, 1–6
Win	24–16	Feb 2004	Australian Open	Grand Slam	Hard	(Argentina) Paola Suárez	(Russia) Svetlana Kuznetsova (Russia) Elena Likhovtseva	6–4, 6–3
Win	25–16	Mar 2004	Indian Wells Open, United States	Tier I	Hard	(Argentina) Paola Suárez	(Russia) Svetlana Kuznetsova (Russia) Elena Likhovtseva	6–1, 6–2
Win	26–16	Apr 2004	Charleston Open, United States (3)	Tier I	Clay	(Argentina) Paola Suárez	(United States) Martina Navratilova (United States) Lisa Raymond	6–4, 6–1
Loss	26–17	May 2004	Italian Open	Tier I	Clay	(Argentina) Paola Suárez	(Russia) Nadia Petrova (United States) Meghann Shaughnessy	6–2, 3–6, 3–6
Win	27–17	Jun 2004	French Open (3)	Grand Slam	Clay	(Argentina) Paola Suárez	(Russia) Svetlana Kuznetsova (Russia) Elena Likhovtseva	6–0, 6–3
Loss	27–18	Jul 2004	LA Championships, United States	Tier II	Hard	(Spain) Conchita Martínez	(Russia) Nadia Petrova (United States) Meghann Shaughnessy	7–6^{(2)}, 4–6, 3–6
Loss	27–19	Jul 2004	San Diego Open, United States	Tier I	Hard	(Argentina) Paola Suárez	(Zimbabwe) Cara Black (Australia) Rennae Stubbs	4–6, 6–1, 6–4
Loss	27–20	Aug 2004	Summer Olympics, Athens	Olympics	Hard	(Spain) Conchita Martínez	(China) Sun Tiantian (China) Li Ting	3–6, 3–6
Win	28–20	Sep 2004	US Open (3)	Grand Slam	Hard	(Argentina) Paola Suárez	(Russia) Svetlana Kuznetsova (Russia) Elena Likhovtseva	6–4, 7–5
Loss	28–21	Oct 2004	Kremlin Cup, Russia	Tier I	Carpet (i)	(Argentina) Paola Suárez	(Russia) Anastasia Myskina (Russia) Vera Zvonareva	3–6, 6–4, 2–6
Loss	28–22	Oct 2004	Zurich Open, Switzerland	Tier I	Hard (i)	(Argentina) Paola Suárez	(Zimbabwe) Cara Black (Australia) Rennae Stubbs	4–6, 4–6
Win	29–22	Oct 2004	Luxembourg Open	Tier III	Hard (i)	(Argentina) Paola Suárez	(United States) Jill Craybas (Germany) Marlene Weingärtner	6–1, 6–7^{(1)}, 6–3
Win	30–22	Mar 2005	Dubai Championships, UAE	Tier II	Hard	(Argentina) Paola Suárez	(Russia) Svetlana Kuznetsova (Australia) Alicia Molik	6–7^{(7)}, 6–2, 6–1
Win	31–22	Mar 2005	Indian Wells Open, United States (2)	Tier I	Hard	(Argentina) Paola Suárez	(Russia) Nadia Petrova (United States) Meghann Shaughnessy	7–6^{(3)}, 6–1
Win	32–22	Apr 2005	Charleston Open, United States (4)	Tier I	Clay	(Spain) Conchita Martínez	(Czech Republic) Iveta Benešová (Czech Republic) Květa Peschke	6–1, 6–4
Win	33–22	Jun 2005	French Open (4)	Grand Slam	Clay	(Argentina) Paola Suárez	(Zimbabwe) Cara Black (South Africa) Liezel Huber	4–6, 6–3, 6–3
Win	34–22	Aug 2005	San Diego Open, United States	Tier I	Hard	(Spain) Conchita Martínez	(Slovakia) Daniela Hantuchová (Japan) Ai Sugiyama	6–7^{(7)}, 6–1, 7–5
Loss	34–23	Aug 2005	Canadian Open	Tier I	Hard	(Spain) Conchita Martínez	(Germany) Anna-Lena Grönefeld (United States) Martina Navratilova	7–5, 3–6, 4–6
Loss	34–24	Oct 2005	Bangkok Open, Thailand	Tier III	Hard	(Spain) Conchita Martínez	(Japan) Shinobu Asagoe (Argentina) Gisela Dulko	1–6, 5–7
Loss	34–25	Oct 2005	Linz Open, Austria	Tier II	Hard (i)	(Spain) Conchita Martínez	(Argentina) Gisela Dulko (Czech Republic) Květa Peschke	2–6, 3–6
Loss	34–26	Jan 2006	Sydney International, Australia	Tier II	Hard	(Argentina) Paola Suárez	(United States) Corina Morariu (Australia) Rennae Stubbs	3–6, 7–5, 2–6
Loss	34–27	Mar 2006	Indian Wells Open, United States	Tier I	Hard	(United States) Meghann Shaughnessy	(United States) Lisa Raymond (Australia) Samantha Stosur	2–6, 5–7
Loss	34–28	Apr 2006	Charleston Open, United States	Tier I	Clay	(United States) Meghann Shaughnessy	(United States) Lisa Raymond (Australia) Samantha Stosur	6–3, 1–6, 1–6
Loss	34–29	Jul 2006	Wimbledon, UK	Grand Slam	Grass	(Argentina) Paola Suárez	(China) Yan Zi (China) Zheng Jie	3–6, 6–3, 2–6
Win	35–29	Aug 2006	LA Championships, United States	Tier II	Hard	(Argentina) Paola Suárez	(Slovakia) Daniela Hantuchová (Japan) Ai Sugiyama	6–3, 6–4
Win	36–29	Sep 2006	China Open	Tier II	Hard	(Argentina) Paola Suárez	(Russia) Anna Chakvetadze (Russia) Elena Vesnina	6–2, 6–4
Win	37–29	Oct 2006	Korea Open, South Korea	Tier IV	Hard	(Argentina) Paola Suárez	(Chinese Taipei) Chuang Chia-jung (Argentina) Mariana Díaz Oliva	6–2, 6–3
Loss	37–30	Jan 2007	Hobart International, Australia	Tier IV	Hard	(Spain) Anabel Medina Garrigues	(Russia) Elena Likhovtseva (Russia) Elena Vesnina	4–6, 5–7
Loss	37–31	Apr 2007	Amelia Island Championships, U.S.	Tier II	Clay	(Spain) Anabel Medina Garrigues	(Italy) Mara Santangelo (Slovenia) Katarina Srebotnik	3–6, 6–7^{(4)}
Loss	37–32	Jun 2007	Rosmalen Open, Netherlands	Tier III	Grass	(Spain) Anabel Medina Garrigues	(Chinese Taipei) Chan Yung-jan (Chinese Taipei) Chuang Chia-jung	5–7, 2–6
Win	38–32	Aug 2007	Nordic Light Open, Sweden	Tier IV	Hard	(Spain) Anabel Medina Garrigues	(Chinese Taipei) Chan Chin-wei (Ukraine) Tetiana Luzhanska	6–1, 5–7, [10–6]
Win	39–32	Jan 2008	Hobart International, Australia (2)	Tier IV	Hard	(Spain) Anabel Medina Garrigues	(Greece) Eleni Daniilidou (Germany) Jasmin Wöhr	6–2, 6–4
Win	40–32	Jun 2008	French Open (5)	Grand Slam	Clay	(Spain) Anabel Medina Garrigues	(Australia) Casey Dellacqua (Italy) Francesca Schiavone	2–6, 7–5, 6–4
Loss	40–33	Jun 2008	Birmingham Classic, UK	Tier III	Grass	(France) Séverine Brémond	(Zimbabwe) Cara Black (United States) Liezel Huber	2–6, 1–6
Win	41–33	Jul 2008	Slovenia Open	Tier IV	Hard	(Spain) Anabel Medina Garrigues	(Russia) Vera Dushevina (Russia) Ekaterina Makarova	6–4, 6–1
Loss	41–34	Aug 2008	Summer Olympics, Beijing	Olympics	Hard	(Spain) Anabel Medina Garrigues	(United States) Serena Williams (United States) Venus Williams	2–6, 0–6
Loss	41–35	Apr 2009	Andalucia Experience, Spain	International	Clay	(Spain) Anabel Medina Garrigues	(Poland) Klaudia Jans (Poland) Alicja Rosolska	3–6, 3–6
Win	42–35	Jun 2009	French Open (6)	Grand Slam	Clay	(Spain) Anabel Medina Garrigues	(Belarus) Victoria Azarenka (Russia) Elena Vesnina	6–1, 6–1
Win	43–35	May 2010	Warsaw Open, Poland	Premier	Clay	(United States) Meghann Shaughnessy	(Zimbabwe) Cara Black (China) Yan Zi	6–3, 6–4

== ITF finals ==
Legend
$75,000 tournaments
$50,000 tournaments
$25,000 tournaments
$10,000 tournaments

=== Singles: 7 (4 titles, 3 runner-ups) ===
Result	W–L	Date	Tournament	Tier	Surface	Opponent	Score
Loss	0–1	Mar 1992	ITF Moncalieri, Italy	25,000	Clay	(Germany) Isabel Cueto	3–6, 2–6
Win	1–1	Jul 1992	ITF Bilbao, Spain	25,000	Clay	(Netherlands) Claire Wegink	7–5, 6–2
Loss	1–2	Jun 1994	ITF Valladolid, Spain	25,000	Clay	(Spain) Cristina Torrens Valero	3–6, 3–6
Win	2–2	Mar 1995	ITF Zaragoza, Spain	10,000	Clay	(Spain) Magüi Serna	2–6, 7–6, 6–2
Win	3–2	Aug 1996	Bronx Open, United States	25,000	Hard	(France) Amélie Mauresmo	6–4, 6–3
Loss	3–3	May 2000	ITF Porto, Portugal	75,000	Clay	(Spain) María Sánchez Lorenzo	4–6, 6–4, 3–6
Win	4–3	Apr 2001	ITF Sarasota, United States	75,000	Clay	(Italy) Maria Elena Camerin	6–0, 6–3

=== Doubles: 18 (10 titles, 8 runner-ups) ===
Result	W–L	Date	Tournament	Tier	Surface	Partner	Opponents	Score
Loss	0–1	Aug 1989	ITF Gangi, Italy	10,000	Hard	(Spain) Neus Ávila	(Italy) Doris Iotti (Venezuela) Nelly Pardo	6–4, 3–6, 2–6
Loss	0–2	Sep 1989	ITF Pamplona, Spain	25,000	Hard	(Spain) Eva Bes	(Brazil) Cláudia Chabalgoity (Spain) Ana Segura	3–6, 0–6
Loss	0–3	Sep 1989	ITF Porto, Portugal	25,000	Clay	(Spain) Inmaculada Varas	(Spain) Janet Souto (Spain) Rosa Bielsa	6–3, 3–6, 4–6
Win	1–3	May 1990	ITF Cascais, Portugal	25,000	Clay	(Spain) Eva Bes	(Netherlands) Simone Schilder (Netherlands) Caroline Vis	3–6, 6–2, 6–1
Loss	1–4	Jul 1990	ITF Vigo, Spain	25,000	Clay	(Spain) Eva Bes	(Spain) María José Llorca (Spain) Ana Segura	3–6, 4–6
Win	2–4	Nov 1990	ITF Lleida, Spain	10,000	Clay	(Spain) Eva Bes	(Spain) Ana Larrakoetxea (Spain) Silvia Ramón-Cortés	6–2, 1–6, 7–5
Loss	2–5	Mar 1991	ITF Alicante, Spain	10,000	Clay	(Spain) Eva Bes	(Spain) Rosa Bielsa (Spain) Silvia Ramón-Cortés	3–6, 6–0, 5–7
Win	3–5	Apr 1991	ITF Turin, Italy	25,000	Clay	(Spain) Eva Bes	(Czechoslovakia) Lucie Šteflová (Czechoslovakia) Helena Vildová	6–7, 6–1, 6–3
Win	4–5	May 1991	ITF Porto, Portugal	50,000	Clay	(Spain) Eva Bes	(South Africa) Mariaan de Swardt (Israel) Yael Segal	6–3, 7–5
Win	5–5	Jun 1991	ITF Mantua, Italy	25,000	Clay	(Austria) Marion Maruska	(Japan) Yone Kamio (Japan) Hiromi Nagano	3–6, 6–4, 6–3
Win	6–5	Aug 1991	ITF Vigo, Spain	25,000	Clay	(Spain) Eva Bes	(Finland) Anne Aallonen (United Kingdom) Belinda Borneo	7–6^{(6)}, 7–5
Win	7–5	Feb 1992	ITF Valencia, Spain	25,000	Clay	(Spain) Estefanía Bottini	(Czechoslovakia) Petra Holubová (Czechoslovakia) Markéta Štusková	6–1, 6–2
Loss	7–6	Apr 1992	ITF Caserta, Italy	25,000	Clay	(Spain) Estefanía Bottini	(Czechoslovakia) Radka Bobková (Czechoslovakia) Jana Pospíšilová	3–6, 6–2, 6–7
Win	8–6	May 1992	ITF Porto, Portugal	50,000	Clay	(Austria) Michelle Jaggard-Lai	(United States) Jennifer Fuchs (Sweden) Maria Strandlund	6–3, 7–5
Win	9–6	Jul 1992	ITF Bilbao, Spain	25,000	Clay	(Spain) Eva Bes	(United States) Jessica Emmons (Australia) Clare Thompson	6–2, 6–4
Loss	9–7	Feb 1993	ITF Valencia, Spain	25,000	Clay	(Spain) Eva Bes	(Netherlands) Gaby Coorengel (Netherlands) Amy van Buuren	4–6, 0–6
Loss	9–8	Feb 1994	ITF Madrid, Spain	25,000	Clay	(Spain) Noelia Pérez Peñate	(Spain) Vanessa Castellano (Spain) Yolanda Clemot	6–2, 3–6, 1–6
Win	10–8	Oct 1995	ITF Lerida, Spain	25,000	Clay	(France) Karine Quentrec	(Spain) Patricia Aznar (Spain) Eva Bes	7–6^{(5)}, 6–0

== Top 10 wins ==
Season	2001	...	2006	Total
Wins	1		1	2

#	Player	Rank	Event	Surface	Rd	Score	VRPR
2001
1.	(Switzerland) Martina Hingis	No. 1	Wimbledon Championships, UK	Grass	1R	6–4, 6–2	No. 83
2006
2.	(Russia) Nadia Petrova	No. 5	LA Championships, United States	Hard	2R	6–3, 6–2	No. 73

== Awards ==
- Named WTA Tour Doubles Team of the Year for third straight year for 2004 with partner Paola Suárez.
- With partner Paola Suárez, received Premio Consagración Clarín al Mérito Deportivo 2003, an award presented to Argentine athletes for their achievements
- With partner Paola Suárez, named 2002 WTA Tour Doubles Team of the Year and 2002 ITF Women's Doubles World Champions
- In 1993 helped Spain recapture the Fed Cup title and defended it in 1994
