= Marissa Irvin =

American tennis player and author

- Country (sports): United States
- Residence: Santa Monica, California, U.S.
- Born: June 23, 1980 (age 45) Santa Monica, California, U.S.
- Height: 5 ft 7 in (1.70 m)
- Turned pro: 2000
- Retired: 2005
- Plays: Right-handed (two-handed backhand)
- College: Stanford
- Prize money: US$ 779,749

Singles
- Career record: 246–167
- Career titles: 0 WTA, 8 ITF
- Highest ranking: No. 51 (August 12, 2002)

Grand Slam singles results
- Australian Open: 2R (2000)
- French Open: 3R (2003-2005)
- Wimbledon: 2R (2005)
- US Open: 2R (2000)

Doubles
- Career record: 34–44
- Career titles: 2 ITF
- Highest ranking: No. 84 (March 18, 2002)

Marissa Irvin Gould (born June 23, 1980) is an American former tennis player and author. She reached her highest singles ranking on August 12, 2002, when she became No. 51 in the world. Her best performance at a major event was reaching the third round of the French Open, which she achieved three straight years from 2003 to 2005. Irvin competed in 22 Grand Slam tournaments during her five-year career.

== Tennis career ==
Irvin was named the Southern California Female Junior Player of the Year in 1994 and 1995, and won the Lee Carlson Award as her high school's most outstanding female athlete. as well as the Block "S" Award at Stanford University as the most outstanding female athlete across all sports in the freshmen class. The highlight of Irvin's junior career was winning the 1997 US Open title in girls' doubles, partnering Alexandra Stevenson as well as reaching a national ranking of No. 1 in the United States in both singles (1998) and doubles (1997). She reached her highest world junior ranking of No. 1 in doubles and No. 19 singles in 1997.

She attended Stanford University, where she was named a Stanford Academic Scholar Athlete and a GTE Academic All-American. She reached the individual finals at the NCAA Championships in 1999 and 2000, as well as winning it for her team in 1999. She was named the 2000 Honda Award winner as the nation's top female collegiate tennis player, was a four-time NCAA All-American and two-time Pac-10 Player of the Year during her two years playing college tennis.

She turned professional in 2000, having already reached a WTA ranking in the top 80 in the world as an amateur. That year, she broke into the top 100 after qualifying for the Australian Open (while still a student at Stanford) and defeating Corina Morariu in the first round before falling to eventual champion, Lindsay Davenport in the second round. She also achieved solid results on the ITF Women's Circuit winning her first professional tournament in Florida. In 2001, she reached her highest year-end ranking of No. 64, and played her first WTA semifinal (upsetting Arantxa Sanchez-Vicario en route) during the Big Island Championships. She reached her highest ranking of No. 51 in August the following year, and beat Justine Henin at the Bank of the West Classic for her biggest career win. Her best results in her final years on tour were the third round at the French Open in 2003, 2004 and 2005, the fourth round of the championships in Key Biscayne in 2002 (los to eventual champion Serena Williams) and the fourth round of the Pacific Life Open in 2004. Irvin had professional wins over Justine Henin, Jelena Janković, Dinara Safina, Anastasia Myskina, Meghann Shaughnessy, Elena Bovina, Amy Frazier, Gisela Dulko, Bethanie Mattek-Sands, and Marion Bartoli.

== Personal ==
Irvin started playing tennis at age 9. Her father, Richard, was a three-time All-American volleyball player at the University of California, Los Angeles, and led his team to three straight national titles. She attended high school at Harvard-Westlake School, graduating with a 3.8 grade point average. Irvin was coached by Chuck Adams, and formerly by 1980 Australian Open champion Brian Teacher. Irvin graduated from Stanford University in 2007 with a degree in Political Science.

In January 2008, she married Patrick Gould.
