= Clarisa Fernández =

Argentine tennis player

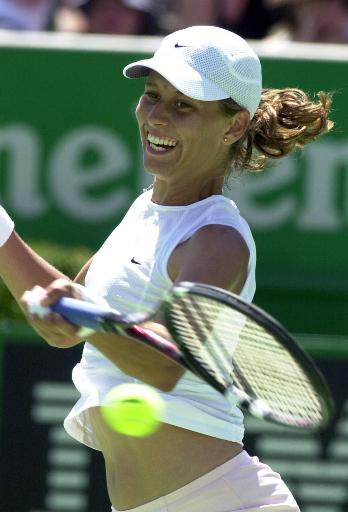
- Country (sports): Argentina
- Residence: Córdoba, Argentina
- Born: 28 August 1981 (age 44); Córdoba
- Height: 1.79 m (5 ft 10 1/2 in)
- Turned pro: 1998
- Retired: 2008
- Plays: Left-handed (two-handed backhand)
- Prize money: $678,184

Singles
- Career record: 228–130
- Career titles: 7 ITF
- Highest ranking: No. 26 (31 March 2003)

Grand Slam singles results
- Australian Open: 3R (2003)
- French Open: SF (2002)
- Wimbledon: 2R (2002, 2006)
- US Open: 1R (2002, 2003, 2006)

Doubles
- Career record: 75–48
- Career titles: 6 ITF
- Highest ranking: No. 111 (28 January 2002)

Team competitions
- Fed Cup: 8–3
Medal record
Pan American Games
Bronze medal – third place	1999 Winnipeg	Women's Doubles

Clarisa Fernández (born 28 August 1981) is an Argentine former professional tennis player.

She is best known for her semifinal appearance at the 2002 French Open, the first Argentine since Sabatini in 1992 to reach that stage. Fernández was ranked 87th in the world at the time of her shocking result. She defeated, in order, Lubomira Bacheva, Jelena Kostanić, Kim Clijsters (No. 4), Elena Dementieva (No. 13), and Paola Suárez, before losing to second-seeded Venus Williams, in straight sets.

Fernández, a crafty left-handed player, turned professional in 1998. She did not have much success before her appearance at the French Open. She has six ITF titles to her name, including one in 2006. Since 2003, Fernández had been plagued with injuries. She suffered from tendinitis in her left shoulder, an injury to her left wrist, and to her right knee. Fernández enjoyed playing on hard and grass courts. She was coached by Leonardo Lerda. Her tennis inspirations were Pete Sampras and Martina Navratilova.

In April 2008, Fernández announced her retirement from professional tennis after a lengthy battle with knee injuries.

== ITF finals ==
$100,000 tournaments
$75,000 tournaments
$50,000 tournaments
$25,000 tournaments
$10,000 tournaments

=== Singles: 10 (7–3) ===
Result	No.	Date	Tournament	Surface	Opponent	Score
Win	1.	12 October 1997	ITF Montevideo, Uruguay	Clay	(Argentina) Celeste Contín	7–6, 6–4
Loss	1.	5 October 1998	ITF Montevideo, Uruguay	Clay	(Hungary) Zsófia Gubacsi	6–0, 3–6, 4–6
Win	2.	18 July 1999	ITF Sezze, Italy	Clay	(Romania) Mihaela Moldovan	6–2, 6–3
Loss	2.	20 September 1999	ITF Thessaloniki, Greece	Carpet	(Greece) Eleni Daniilidou	2–6, 2–6
Win	3.	7 January 2001	ITF São Paulo, Brazil	Hard	(Netherlands) Seda Noorlander	6–3, 6–1
Win	4.	8 July 2001	ITF Orbetello, Italy	Clay	(Slovakia) Martina Suchá	6–4, 2–6, 7–5
Win	5.	23 January 2005	ITF Miami, United States	Hard	(China) Xie Yanze	6–4, 6–2
Win	6.	5 March 2006	ITF Clearwater, United States	Hard	(Italy) Alberta Brianti	7–5, 6–2
Loss	3.	15 October 2006	ITF San Francisco, United States	Hard	(United States) Ashley Harkleroad	2–6, 3–6
Win	7.	25 November 2007	ITF Mexico City	Hard	(United States) Julia Cohen	6–1, 6–2

=== Doubles: 10 (6–4) ===
Result	No.	Date	Tournament	Surface	Partner	Opponents	Score
Win	1.	21 June 1999	ITF Orbetello, Italy	Clay	(Argentina) Mariana Díaz Oliva	(Russia) Maria Goloviznina (Russia) Anastasia Myskina	6–4, 6–2
Loss	1.	5 September 1999	ITF Spoleto, Italy	Clay	(Italy) Francesca Schiavone	(Netherlands) Debby Haak (Netherlands) Andrea van den Hurk	1–6, 1–6
Loss	2.	14 November 1999	ITF Monterrey, Mexico	Hard	(Italy) Alice Canepa	(Paraguay) Rossana de los Ríos (Argentina) Mariana Díaz Oliva	6–4, 6–7^{(6)}, 3–6
Loss	3.	10 December 2000	ITF Bogotá, Colombia	Hard	(Spain) Conchita Martínez Granados	(Brazil) Joana Cortez (Argentina) Mariana Díaz Oliva	6–3, 1–6, 2–6
Win	2.	7 January 2001	ITF São Paulo, Brazil	Hard	(Argentina) Romina Ottoboni	(Brazil) Miriam D'Agostini (Brazil) Vanessa Menga	6–1, 7–6^{(6)}
Win	3.	29 January 2001	ITF Clearwater, United States	Hard	(Brazil) Joana Cortez	(Russia) Evgenia Kulikovskaya (United States) Jolene Watanabe	6–1, 7–5
Loss	4.	15 April 2001	ITF San Luis Potosí, Mexico	Clay	(Brazil) Joana Cortez	(Argentina) Eugenia Chialvo (Spain) Conchita Martínez Granados	7–6^{(3)}, 1–6, 1–6
Win	4.	13 August 2001	Bronx Open, United States	Hard	(Japan) Rika Fujiwara	(Netherlands) Kristie Boogert (Belgium) Els Callens	2–6, 7–6^{(3)}, 6–4
Win	5.	7 October 2001	ITF Fresno, United States	Hard	(United States) Samantha Reeves	(United States) Ashley Harkleroad (Canada) Marie-Ève Pelletier	6–2, 4–6, 7–5
Win	6.	27 March 2005	ITF San Luis Potosí, Mexico	Clay	(Spain) Lourdes Domínguez Lino	(Brazil) Joana Cortez (Japan) Tomoko Yonemura	6–2, 6–2

== Head-to-head records ==
=== Record against top-ten players ===
Fernández' match records against players who have been ranked in the top 10, with those who have been ranked No. 1 in boldface

- (Belgium) **Kim Clijsters** 1–0
- (Russia) Elena Dementieva 1–0
- (Czech Republic) Petra Kvitová 1–0
- (France) Mary Pierce 1–0
- (Japan) Ai Sugiyama 1–0
- (Argentina) Paola Suárez 1–1
- (Russia) Anastasia Myskina 1–3
- (Italy) Flavia Pennetta 1–4
- (United States) **Lindsay Davenport** 0–1
- (Slovakia) Daniela Hantuchová 0–1
- (Belgium) **Justine Henin** 0–1
- (Switzerland) **Martina Hingis** 0–1
- (Bulgaria) Magdalena Maleeva 0–1
- (France) **Amélie Mauresmo** 0–1
- (Australia) Alicia Molik 0–1
- (Russia) Nadia Petrova 0–1
- (United States) **Venus Williams** 0–1
- (Austria) Barbara Schett 0–3
