= Elena Dementieva career statistics =

Career finals
| Discipline | Type | Won | Lost | Total |
|---|---|---|---|---|
| Singles | Grand Slam | 0 | 2 | 2 |
| Singles | Summer Olympics | 1 | 1 | 2 |
| Singles | WTA Finals (Note: Formerly known as: Virginia Slims Championships (until 1995); WTA Tour Championships (until 2014)) | 0 | 0 | 0 |
| Singles | WTA Elite (Note: Elite tier: WTA Tournament of Champions (2009–14); WTA Elite Trophy (2015–present)) | – | – | – |
| Singles | WTA 1000 (Note: Formerly known as: Category 4 & 5 & 6 (until 1990); Tier I (until 2009); WTA Premier Mandatory and 5 (until 2021)) | 3 | 7 | 10 |
| Singles | WTA 500 (Note: Formerly known as: Category 3 (until 1990); Tier II (until 2009); WTA Premier (until 2021)) | 7 | 2 | 9 |
| Singles | WTA 250 (Note: Formerly known as: Category 1 & 2 (until 1990); Tier III & IV & V (until 2009); WTA International (until 2021)) | 5 | 4 | 9 |
| Singles | Total | 16 | 16 | 32 |
| Doubles | Grand Slam | 0 | 2 | 2 |
| Doubles | Summer Olympics | 0 | 0 | 0 |
| Doubles | WTA Finals | 1 | 0 | 1 |
| Doubles | WTA Elite | – | – | – |
| Doubles | WTA 1000 | 2 | 3 | 5 |
| Doubles | WTA 500 | 2 | 2 | 4 |
| Doubles | WTA 250 | 1 | 0 | 1 |
| Doubles | Total | 6 | 7 | 13 |
| Total | | 22 | 23 | 45 |

Elena Dementieva is a former Russian professional tennis player. Throughout her career, Dementieva has won sixteen WTA singles titles including two WTA Tier I singles titles, one WTA Premier 5 singles title and the gold medal in singles at the 2008 Beijing Olympic Games. She was also the runner-up at the 2004 French Open and 2004 US Open and a semi-finalist at the 2008 Wimbledon Championships, 2009 Australian Open and 2009 Wimbledon Championships. Dementieva was also a Silver Medallist in singles at the 2000 Sydney Olympic Games and a two-time semi-finalist at the year-ending WTA Tour Championships. On April 3, 2009, Dementieva achieved a new career high singles ranking of World No. 3.

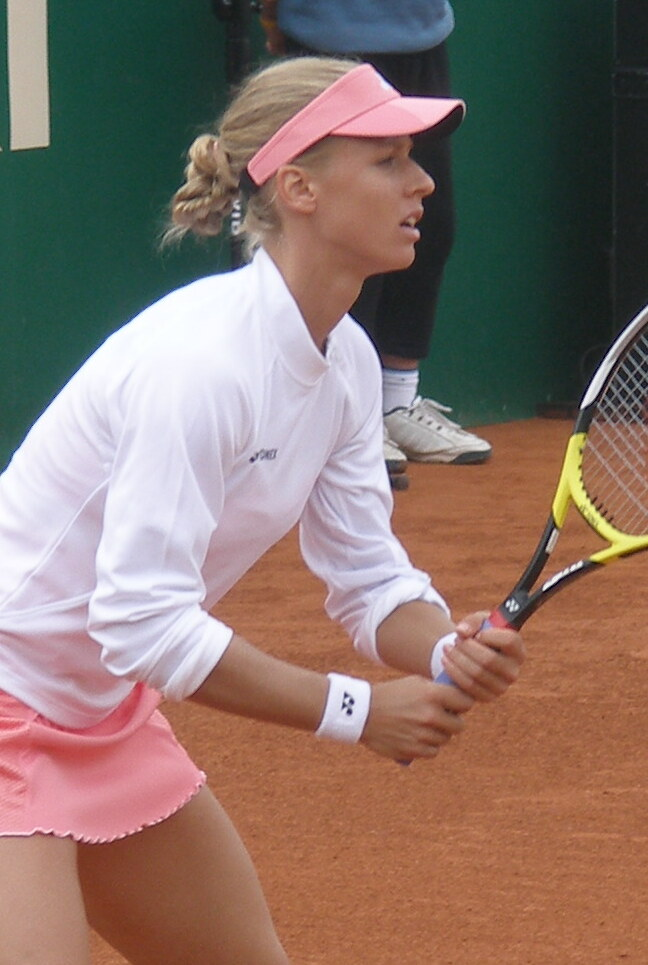
Dementieva in 2008.

== Performance timelines ==
Key
| W | F | SF | QF | #R | RR | Q# | P# | DNQ | A | Z# | PO | G | S | B | NMS | NTI | P | NH |

(W) winner; (F) finalist; (SF) semifinalist; (QF) quarterfinalist; (#R) rounds 4, 3, 2, 1; (RR) round-robin stage; (Q#) qualification round; (P#) preliminary round; (DNQ) did not qualify; (A) absent; (Z#) Davis/Fed Cup Zonal Group (with number indication) or (PO) play-off; (G) gold, (S) silver or (B) bronze Olympic/Paralympic medal; (NMS) not a Masters tournament; (NTI) not a Tier I tournament; (P) postponed; (NH) not held; (SR) strike rate (events won / competed); (W–L) win–loss record.
To avoid confusion and double counting, these charts are updated at the conclusion of a tournament or when the player's participation has ended.

Only main-draw results in WTA Tour, Grand Slam tournaments, Billie Jean King Cup (Fed Cup), Hopman Cup and Olympic Games are included in win–loss records.

=== Singles ===
| Tournament | 1997 | 1998 | 1999 | 2000 | 2001 | 2002 | 2003 | 2004 | 2005 | 2006 | 2007 | 2008 | 2009 | 2010 | SR | W–L | Win% |
|---|---|---|---|---|---|---|---|---|---|---|---|---|---|---|---|---|---|
Grand Slam tournaments
| Australian Open | A | A | 2R | 3R | 3R | 4R | 1R | 1R | 4R | 1R | 4R | 4R | SF | 2R | 0 / 12 | 23–12 | 66% |
| French Open | A | A | 2R | 2R (Note: Withdraw during the tournament. Not counted as a loss.) | 2R | 4R | 1R | F | 4R | 3R | 3R | QF | 3R | SF | 0 / 12 | 30–11 | 73% |
| Wimbledon | A | A | 1R | 1R | 3R | 4R | 4R | 1R | 4R | QF | 3R | SF | SF | A | 0 / 11 | 27–11 | 71% |
| US Open | A | Q1 | 3R | SF | 4R | 2R | 4R | F | SF | QF | 3R | SF | 2R | 4R | 0 / 12 | 39–12 | 76% |
| Win–loss | 0–0 | 0–0 | 4–4 | 8–3 | 8–4 | 10–4 | 6–4 | 11–4 | 14–4 | 10–4 | 9–4 | 17–4 | 13–4 | 9–3 | 0 / 47 | 119–46 | 72% |
National representation
| Summer Olympics | NH | | | S | NH | | | 1R | NH | | | G | NH | | 1 / 3 | 11–2 | 85% |
Year-end championships
| WTA Finals | DNQ | | | SF | 1R | 1R | RR | RR | RR | RR | DNQ | SF | RR | RR | 0 / 10 | 7–20 | 26% |
WTA 1000 + former^{†} tournaments
| Dubai / Qatar Open (Note: The first Premier 5 event of the year has switched back and forth between the Dubai Tennis Championships and the Qatar Total Open since 2009. Dubai was classified as a Premier 5 event from 2009 to 2011 before being succeeded by Doha for the 2012–2014 period. In 2015, Dubai regained its Premier 5 status while Doha was demoted to Premier status. The Premier 5 tournaments were reclassified as WTA 1000 tournaments in 2021.) | NH/NMS | | | | | | | | | | | A | QF | 2R | 0 / 2 | 4–2 | 67% |
| Indian Wells Open | A | A | A | SF | QF | 3R | 4R | A | SF | F | A | A | 2R | QF | 0 / 8 | 23–8 | 74% |
| Miami Open | A | A | Q2 | 4R | SF | QF | 2R | F | QF | 4R | A | QF | 4R | 2R | 0 / 10 | 25–10 | 71% |
| Berlin / Madrid Open (Note: In 2009, the Berlin Open was replaced by the Madrid Open. The Premier Mandatory tournaments were reclassified as WTA 1000 tournaments in 2021.) | A | A | Q2 | QF | A | 1R | 1R | 3R | A | 3R | 3R | F | 3R | 2R | 0 / 9 | 14–9 | 61% |
| Italian Open | A | A | 2R | 2R | A | 1R | A | 2R | 2R | QF | QF | A | A | 3R | 0 / 8 | 7–8 | 47% |
| Canadian Open | A | A | Q2 | 1R | 3R | 2R | SF | 2R | A | A | 2R | 2R | W | 3R | 1 / 9 | 12–8 | 60% |
| Cincinnati Open | NH | | | | | | | NMS | | | | | SF | 2R | 0 / 2 | 3–2 | 60% |
| Pan Pacific Open | A | A | A | A | A | 2R | QF | 2R | QF | W | SF | QF | 2R | F | 1 / 9 | 15–8 | 65% |
| China Open | NH/NMS | | | | | | | | | | | | QF | 3R | 0 / 2 | 4–2 | 67% |
| Charleston Open^{†} | A | A | A | 3R | A | 2R | 3R | 3R | F | A | A | SF | NMS | | 0 / 6 | 13–6 | 68% |
| Southern California Open^{†} | NMS | | | | | | | SF | 2R | QF | SF | NH/NMS | | | 0 / 4 | 9–4 | 69% |
| Kremlin Cup^{†} | 1R | 1R | 1R | QF | F | 2R | SF | F | SF | SF | W | SF | NMS | | 1 / 12 | 24–11 | 69% |
| Zurich Open^{†} | A | A | 1R | 2R | 1R | 2R | 2R | SF | QF | 2R | 1R | NH/NMS | | | 0 / 9 | 5–9 | 36% |
| Win–loss | 0–1 | 0–1 | 1–3 | 17–8 | 12–5 | 9–9 | 12–8 | 16–9 | 15–8 | 17–7 | 16–6 | 13–6 | 17–7 | 13–9 | 3 / 90 | 158–87 | 64% |
Career statistics
| | 1997 | 1998 | 1999 | 2000 | 2001 | 2002 | 2003 | 2004 | 2005 | 2006 | 2007 | 2008 | 2009 | 2010 | SR | W–L | Win% |
| Tournaments | 1 | 2 | 11 | 20 | 22 | 26 | 27 | 22 | 20 | 21 | 20 | 19 | 20 | 20 | Career total: 251 | | |
| Titles | 0 | 0 | 0 | 0 | 0 | 0 | 3 | 1 | 0 | 2 | 2 | 3 | 3 | 2 | Career total: 16 | | |
| Finals | 0 | 0 | 0 | 1 | 2 | 1 | 3 | 5 | 2 | 3 | 2 | 5 | 4 | 4 | Career total: 32 | | |
| Hard win–loss | 0–0 | 0–0 | 7–6 | 25–10 | 17–12 | 15–13 | 25–13 | 24–14 | 27–14 | 24–12 | 24–11 | 33–10 | 36–11 | 30–14 | 12 / 144 | 287–140 | 67% |
| Clay win–loss | 0–0 | 0–1 | 5–5 | 7–4 | 11–4 | 13–8 | 10–6 | 8–5 | 12–4 | 9–5 | 12–4 | 14–4 | 10–4 | 7–4 | 2 / 57 | 118–58 | 67% |
| Grass win–loss | 0–0 | 0–0 | 0–1 | 0–1 | 2–2 | 7–2 | 7–3 | 0–1 | 3–2 | 6–2 | 3–2 | 7–2 | 6–2 | 0–0 | 0 / 20 | 41–20 | 67% |
| Carpet win–loss | 0–1 | 0–1 | 0–1 | 5–4 | 8–4 | 4–4 | 7–3 | 5–3 | 3–2 | 8–2 | 2–1 | 2–1 | 3–1 | 4–0 | 2 / 30 | 51–28 | 65% |
| Overall win–loss | 0–1 | 0–2 | 12–13 | 37–19 | 38–22 | 39–27 | 49–25 | 37–23 | 45–22 | 47–21 | 41–18 | 56–17 | 55–18 | 41–18 | 16 / 251 | 497–246 | 67% |
| Win % | 0% | 0% | 48% | 66% | 63% | 59% | 66% | 62% | 67% | 69% | 69% | 77% | 75% | 69% | Career total: 67% | | |
| Year-end ranking | 355 | 182 | 62 | 11 | 15 | 19 | 8 | 6 | 8 | 8 | 11 | 4 | 5 | 9 | $14,867,436 | | |

=== Doubles ===
| Tournament | 1997 | 1998 | 1999 | 2000 | 2001 | 2002 | 2003 | 2004 | 2005 | 2006 | 2007 | 2008 | 2009 | 2010 | SR | W–L | Win% |
|---|---|---|---|---|---|---|---|---|---|---|---|---|---|---|---|---|---|
Grand Slam tournaments
| Australian Open | A | A | A | A | A | A | 2R | 2R | 3R | 3R | 3R | A | A | A | 0 / 5 | 8–5 | 62% |
| French Open | A | A | A | A | A | 2R | 2R | 3R | 2R | 2R | A | A | A | A | 0 / 5 | 6–4 | 60% |
| Wimbledon | A | A | A | A | A | 1R | SF | A | A | 3R | 2R | A | A | A | 0 / 4 | 7–4 | 64% |
| US Open | A | A | A | A | 2R | F | 3R | SF | F | A | 2R | A | A | A | 0 / 6 | 18–4 | 82% |
| Win–loss | 0–0 | 0–0 | 0–0 | 0–0 | 1–0 | 6–2 | 8–4 | 7–2 | 8–3 | 5–3 | 4–3 | 0–0 | 0–0 | 0–0 | 0 / 20 | 39–17 | 70% |
National representation
| Summer Olympics | NH | | | A | NH | | | 1R | NH | | | A | NH | | 0 / 1 | 0–1 | 0% |
Year-end championship
| WTA Finals | DNQ | | | | | W | DNQ | | | | | | | | 1 / 1 | 3–0 | 100% |
WTA Premier Mandatory & 5 + former
| Indian Wells Open | A | A | A | A | A | F | QF | A | 2R | 2R | A | A | A | A | 0 / 4 | 7–3 | 70% |
| Miami Open | A | A | A | A | 1R | 2R | 1R | 2R | QF | A | A | A | A | A | 0 / 5 | 4–5 | 44% |
| Berlin / Madrid Open | A | A | A | A | A | W | 1R | 1R | A | F | A | A | A | A | 1 / 4 | 9–3 | 75% |
| Italian Open | A | A | A | A | A | 2R | A | QF | A | A | A | A | A | A | 0 / 2 | 3–2 | 60% |
| Canadian Open | A | A | A | A | Q1 | SF | QF | A | A | A | 2R | A | A | A | 0 / 3 | 5–2 | 71% |
| Pan Pacific Open | A | A | A | A | A | 1R | 1R | 1R | SF | 1R | QF | A | A | A | 0 / 6 | 3–5 | 38% |
| Charleston Open^{†} | A | A | A | A | A | 2R | SF | 2R | A | A | A | A | NMS | | 0 / 3 | 5–2 | 71% |
| Southern California Open^{†} | A | A | A | A | A | A | A | QF | 2R | 1R | A | A | NH | | 0 / 3 | 2–3 | 40% |
| Kremlin Cup^{†} | Q1 | Q2 | A | QF | F | W | 1R | SF | 1R | A | A | A | NMS | | 1 / 6 | 10–5 | 67% |
| Zurich Open^{†} | A | A | A | A | 1R | 1R | 1R | A | QF | A | A | NH/NMS | | | 0 / 4 | 1–4 | 20% |
| Win–loss | 0–0 | 0–0 | 0–0 | 1–1 | 3–3 | 18–6 | 6–8 | 7–7 | 7–5 | 5–3 | 2–1 | 0–0 | 0–0 | 0–0 | 2 / 40 | 49–34 | 59% |
Career statistics
| | 1997 | 1998 | 1999 | 2000 | 2001 | 2002 | 2003 | 2004 | 2005 | 2006 | 2007 | 2008 | 2009 | 2010 | SR | W–L | Win% |
| Tournaments | 0 | 0 | 0 | 2 | 8 | 21 | 19 | 15 | 13 | 12 | 5 | 0 | 1 | 0 | Career total: 96 | | |
| Titles | 0 | 0 | 0 | 0 | 0 | 4 | 1 | 0 | 1 | 0 | 0 | 0 | 0 | 0 | Career total: 6 | | |
| Finals | 0 | 0 | 0 | 0 | 1 | 7 | 1 | 0 | 3 | 1 | 0 | 0 | 0 | 0 | Career total: 13 | | |
| Overall win–loss | 0–0 | 0–0 | 0–2 | 1–2 | 7–8 | 39–14 | 23–17 | 15–13 | 24–8 | 16–11 | 6–4 | 0–0 | 2–1 | 0–1 | 6 / 96 | 133–81 | 62% |
| Year-end ranking | 463 | 313 | n/a | | 98 | 6 | 24 | 27 | 18 | 40 | 90 | n/a | | | | | |

== Significant finals ==
=== Grand Slams ===
==== Singles: 2 runner-ups ====
| Result | Year | Championship | Surface | Opponent | Score |
|---|---|---|---|---|---|
| Loss | 2004 | French Open | Clay | (Russia) Anastasia Myskina | 1–6, 2–6 |
| Loss | 2004 | US Open | Hard | (Russia) Svetlana Kuznetsova | 3–6, 5–7 |

==== Doubles: 2 runner-ups ====
| Result | Year | Championship | Surface | Partner | Opponents | Score |
|---|---|---|---|---|---|---|
| Loss | 2002 | US Open | Hard | (Slovakia) Janette Husárová | (Spain) Virginia Ruano Pascual; (Argentina) Paola Suárez | 2–6, 1–6 |
| Loss | 2005 | US Open | Hard | (Italy) Flavia Pennetta | (United States) Lisa Raymond; (Australia) Samantha Stosur | 2–6, 7–5, 3–6 |

=== Olympics ===
==== Singles: 2 (1 gold medal, 1 silver medal) ====
| Result | Year | Tournament | Surface | Opponent | Score |
|---|---|---|---|---|---|
| Silver | 2000 | Summer Olympics, Sydney | Hard | (United States) Venus Williams | 2–6, 4–6 |
| Gold | 2008 | Summer Olympics, Beijing | Hard | (Russia) Dinara Safina | 3–6, 7–5, 6–3 |

=== WTA Finals ===
==== Doubles: 1 title ====
| Result | Year | Tournament | Surface | Partner | Opponents | Score |
|---|---|---|---|---|---|---|
| Win | 2002 | WTA Tour Championships, Los Angeles | Carpet (i) | (Slovakia) Janette Husárová | (Zimbabwe) Cara Black (Russia) Elena Likhovtseva | 4–6, 6–4, 6–3 |

=== WTA 1000 ===
==== Singles: 10 (3 titles, 7 runner–ups) ====
| Result | Year | Tournament | Surface | Opponent | Score |
|---|---|---|---|---|---|
| Loss | 2001 | Kremlin Cup | Carpet (i) | (Serbia and Montenegro) Jelena Dokić | 3–6, 3–6 |
| Loss | 2004 | Miami Open | Hard | (United States) Serena Williams | 1–6, 1–6 |
| Loss | 2004 | Kremlin Cup | Carpet (i) | (Russia) Anastasia Myskina | 5–7, 0–6 |
| Loss | 2005 | Charleston Open | Clay | (Belgium) Justine Henin | 5–7, 4–6 |
| Win | 2006 | Pan Pacific Open | Carpet (i) | (Switzerland) Martina Hingis | 6–2, 6–0 |
| Loss | 2006 | Indian Wells Open | Hard | (Russia) Maria Sharapova | 1–6, 2–6 |
| Win | 2007 | Kremlin Cup | Hard (i) | (United States) Serena Williams | 5–7, 6–1, 6–1 |
| Loss | 2008 | Berlin Open | Clay | (Russia) Dinara Safina | 6–3, 2–6, 2–6 |
| Win | 2009 | Canadian Open (Toronto) | Hard | (Russia) Maria Sharapova | 6–4, 6–3 |
| Loss | 2010 | Pan Pacific Open | Hard | (Denmark) Caroline Wozniacki | 6–1, 2–6, 3–6 |

==== Doubles: 5 (2 titles, 3 runner–ups) ====
| Result | Year | Tournament | Surface | Partner | Opponents | Score |
|---|---|---|---|---|---|---|
| Loss | 2001 | Kremlin Cup | Carpet (i) | (Russia) Lina Krasnoroutskaya | (Switzerland) Martina Hingis; (Russia) Anna Kournikova | 6–7^{(1–7)}, 3–6 |
| Loss | 2002 | Indian Wells Open | Hard | (Slovakia) Janette Husárová | (United States) Lisa Raymond; (Australia) Rennae Stubbs | 5–7, 0–6 |
| Win | 2002 | Berlin Open | Clay | (Slovakia) Janette Husárová | (Slovakia) Daniela Hantuchová; (Spain) Arantxa Sánchez Vicario | 0–6, 7–6^{(7–3)}, 6–2 |
| Win | 2002 | Kremlin Cup | Carpet (i) | (Slovakia) Janette Husárová | (Serbia and Montenegro) Jelena Dokić; (Russia) Nadia Petrova | 2–6, 6–3, 7–6^{(9–7)} |
| Loss | 2006 | Berlin Open | Clay | (Italy) Flavia Pennetta | (China) Yan Zi; (China) Zheng Jie | 2–6, 3–6 |

== WTA Tour finals ==
=== Singles: 32 (16 titles, 16 runner-ups) ===
| Legend Grand Slam tournaments (0–2) Summer Olympics (1–1) WTA 1000 (Tier I / Premier 5) (3–7) WTA 500 (Tier II / Premier) (7–2) WTA 250 (Tier III / International) (5–4) | Titles by surface Hard (13–8) Grass (0–1) Clay (2–5) Carpet (1–2) |

| Result | W–L | Date | Tournament | Tier | Surface | Opponent | Score |
|---|---|---|---|---|---|---|---|
| Loss | 0–1 | Sep 2000 | Summer Olympics, Australia | Olympics | Hard | (United States) Venus Williams | 2–6, 4–6 |
| Loss | 0–2 | Mar 2001 | Mexican Open | Tier III | Clay | (South Africa) Amanda Coetzer | 6–2, 1–6, 2–6 |
| Loss | 0–3 | Oct 2001 | Kremlin Cup, Russia | Tier I | Carpet (i) | (Serbia and Montenegro) Jelena Dokić | 3–6, 3–6 |
| Loss | 0–4 | Jun 2002 | Rosmalen Championships, Netherlands | Tier III | Grass | (Greece) Eleni Daniilidou | 6–3, 2–6, 3–6 |
| Win | 1–4 | Apr 2003 | Amelia Island Championships, U.S. | Tier II | Clay | (United States) Lindsay Davenport | 4–6, 7–5, 6–3 |
| Win | 2–4 | Sep 2003 | Commonwealth Bank Classic, Indonesia | Tier III | Hard | (United States) Chanda Rubin | 6–2, 6–1 |
| Win | 3–4 | Sep 2003 | China Open | Tier II | Hard | (United States) Chanda Rubin | 6–3, 7–6^{(8–6)} |
| Loss | 3–5 | Apr 2004 | Miami Open, U.S. | Tier I | Hard | (United States) Serena Williams | 1–6, 1–6 |
| Loss | 3–6 | Jun 2004 | French Open | Grand Slam | Clay | (Russia) Anastasia Myskina | 1–6, 2–6 |
| Loss | 3–7 | Sep 2004 | US Open | Grand Slam | Hard | (Russia) Svetlana Kuznetsova | 3–6, 5–7 |
| Win | 4–7 | Sep 2004 | Gaz de France Stars, Belgium | Tier III | Hard (i) | (Russia) Elena Bovina | 0–6, 6–0, 6–4 |
| Loss | 4–8 | Oct 2004 | Kremlin Cup, Russia | Tier I | Carpet (i) | (Russia) Anastasia Myskina | 5–7, 0–6 |
| Loss | 4–9 | Apr 2005 | Family Circle Cup, United States | Tier I | Clay | (Belgium) Justine Henin | 5–7, 4–6 |
| Loss | 4–10 | Nov 2005 | Advanta Championships of Philadelphia, U.S. | Tier II | Hard (i) | (France) Amélie Mauresmo | 5–7, 6–2, 5–7 |
| Win | 5–10 | Feb 2006 | Pan Pacific Open, Japan | Tier I | Carpet (i) | (Switzerland) Martina Hingis | 6–2, 6–0 |
| Loss | 5–11 | Mar 2006 | Indian Wells Open, U.S. | Tier I | Hard | (Russia) Maria Sharapova | 1–6, 2–6 |
| Win | 6–11 | Aug 2006 | LA Championships, U.S. | Tier II | Hard | (Serbia) Jelena Janković | 6–3, 4–6, 6–4 |
| Win | 7–11 | May 2007 | İstanbul Cup, Turkey | Tier III | Clay | (France) Aravane Rezaï | 7–6^{(7–5)}, 3–0, ret. |
| Win | 8–11 | Oct 2007 | Kremlin Cup, Russia | Tier I | Hard (i) | (United States) Serena Williams | 5–7, 6–1, 6–1 |
| Win | 9–11 | Mar 2008 | Dubai Championships, UAE | Tier II | Hard | (Russia) Svetlana Kuznetsova | 4–6, 6–3, 6–2 |
| Loss | 9–12 | May 2008 | Berlin Open, Germany | Tier I | Clay | (Russia) Dinara Safina | 6–3, 2–6, 2–6 |
| Loss | 9–13 | May 2008 | İstanbul Cup, Turkey | Tier III | Clay | (Poland) Agnieszka Radwańska | 3–6, 2–6 |
| Win | 10–13 | Aug 2008 | Summer Olympics, China | Olympics | Hard | (Russia) Dinara Safina | 3–6, 7–5, 6–3 |
| Win | 11–13 | Oct 2008 | Luxembourg Open | Tier III | Hard (i) | (Denmark) Caroline Wozniacki | 2–6, 6–4, 7–6^{(7–4)} |
| Win | 12–13 | Jan 2009 | Auckland Open, New Zealand | International | Hard | (Russia) Elena Vesnina | 6–4, 6–1 |
| Win | 13–13 | Jan 2009 | Sydney International, Australia | Premier | Hard | (Russia) Dinara Safina | 6–3, 2–6, 6–1 |
| Loss | 13–14 | Feb 2009 | Open GDF Suez, France | Premier | Hard (i) | (France) Amélie Mauresmo | 6–7^{(9–7)}, 6–2, 4–6 |
| Win | 14–14 | Aug 2009 | Canadian Open (Toronto) | Premier 5 | Hard | (Russia) Maria Sharapova | 6–4, 6–3 |
| Win | 15–14 | Jan 2010 | Sydney International, Australia | Premier | Hard | (United States) Serena Williams | 6–3, 6–2 |
| Win | 16–14 | Feb 2010 | Open GDF Suez, France | Premier | Hard (i) | (Czech Republic) Lucie Šafářová | 6–7^{(5–7)}, 6–1, 6–4 |
| Loss | 16–15 | Feb 2010 | Malaysian Open | International | Hard | (Russia) Alisa Kleybanova | 3–6, 2–6 |
| Loss | 16–16 | Oct 2010 | Pan Pacific Open, Japan | Premier 5 | Hard | (Denmark) Caroline Wozniacki | 6–1, 2–6, 3–6 |

=== Doubles: 13 (6 titles, 7 runner-ups) ===
| Legend Grand Slam tournaments (0–2) Elite (1–0) WTA 1000 (Tier I) (2–3) WTA 500 (Tier II) (2–2) WTA 250 (Tier III) (1–0) | Titles by surface Hard (2–4) Grass (1–0) Clay (1–1) Carpet (2–2) |

| Result | W–L | Date | Tournament | Tier | Surface | Partner | Opponent | Score |
|---|---|---|---|---|---|---|---|---|
| Loss | 0–1 | Oct 2001 | Kremlin Cup, Russia | Tier I | Carpet | (Russia) Lina Krasnoroutskaya | (Russia) Anna Kournikova; (Switzerland) Martina Hingis | 7–6^{(7–1)}, 6–3 |
| Loss | 0–2 | Feb 2002 | Open GDF Suez, France | Tier II | Carpet | (Slovakia) Janette Husárová | (France) Nathalie Dechy; (United States) Meilen Tu | walkover |
| Loss | 0–3 | Mar 2002 | Indian Wells Open, U.S. | Tier I | Hard | (Slovakia) Janette Husárová | (United States) Lisa Raymond; (Australia) Rennae Stubbs | 7–5, 6–0 |
| Win | 1–3 | May 2002 | Berlin Open, Germany | Tier I | Clay | (Slovakia) Janette Husárová | (Slovakia) Daniela Hantuchová; (Spain) Arantxa Sánchez | 0–6, 7–6^{(7–3)}, 6–2 |
| Win | 2–3 | Aug 2002 | Southern California Open, United States | Tier II | Hard | (Slovakia) Janette Husárová | (Slovakia) Daniela Hantuchová; (Japan) Ai Sugiyama | 6–2, 6–4 |
| Loss | 2–4 | Aug 2002 | US Open | Grand Slam | Hard | (Slovakia) Janette Husárová | (Spain) Virginia Ruano Pascual; (Argentina) Paola Suárez | 6–2, 6–1 |
| Win | 3–4 | Oct 2002 | Kremlin Cup, Russia | Tier I | Carpet | (Slovakia) Janette Husárová | (Serbia and Montenegro) Jelena Dokić; (Russia) Nadia Petrova | 2–6, 6–3, 7–6^{(9–7)} |
| Win | 4–4 | Nov 2002 | WTA Tour Championships, U.S. | Finals | Carpet | (Slovakia) Janette Husárová | (Zimbabwe) Cara Black; (Russia) Elena Likhovtseva | 4–6, 6–4, 6–3 |
| Win | 5–4 | Jun 2003 | Rosmalen Championships, Netherlands | Tier III | Grass | (Russia) Lina Krasnoroutskaya | (Russia) Nadia Petrova; (France) Mary Pierce | 2–6, 6–3, 6–4 |
| Loss | 5–5 | Jan 2005 | Sydney International, Australia | Tier II | Hard | (Japan) Ai Sugiyama | (Australia) Bryanne Stewart; (Australia) Samantha Stosur | walkover |
| Win | 6–5 | Aug 2005 | LA Championships, U.S. | Tier II | Hard | (Italy) Flavia Pennetta | (United States) Bethanie Mattek; (United States) Angela Haynes | 6–2, 6–4 |
| Loss | 6–6 | Aug 2005 | US Open | Grand Slam | Hard | (Italy) Flavia Pennetta | (United States) Lisa Raymond; (Australia) Samantha Stosur | 6–2, 5–7, 6–3 |
| Loss | 6–7 | May 2006 | Berlin Open, Germany | Tier I | Clay | (Italy) Flavia Pennetta | (China) Yan Zi; (China) Zheng Jie | 6–2, 6–3 |

== ITF Circuit finals ==
=== Singles: 4 (3 titles, 1 runner-up) ===
Legend
$10,000 tournaments (3–1)

| Result | W–L | Date | Tournament | Tier | Surface | Opponent | Score |
|---|---|---|---|---|---|---|---|
| Win | 1–0 | Oct 1996 | ITF Jūrmala, Latvia | 10,000 | Carpet (i) | (Belarus) Vera Zhukovets | 6–2, 6–2 |
| Win | 2–0 | Aug 1997 | ITF Istanbul, Turkey | 10,000 | Hard | (Bulgaria) Desislava Topalova | 7–5, 6–4 |
| Loss | 2–1 | Aug 1997 | ITF Batumi, Georgia | 10,000 | Hard | (Russia) Anastasia Myskina | 7–6, 4–6, 5–7 |
| Win | 3–1 | Mar 1998 | ITF Buchen, Germany | 10,000 | Carpet (i) | (Germany) Miriam Schnitzer | 6–1, 6–3 |

=== Doubles: 4 (3 titles, 1 runner-up) ===
Legend
$10,000 tournaments (3–1)

| Result | W–L | Date | Tournament | Tier | Surface | Partner | Opponent | Score |
|---|---|---|---|---|---|---|---|---|
| Win | 1–0 | Jun 1997 | ITF Istanbul, Turkey | 10,000 | Clay | (Russia) Anastasia Myskina | (Turkey) Seden Özlü; (Turkey) Stela Penciu | 6–0, 6–2 |
| Win | 2–0 | Oct 1997 | ITF Tbilisi, Georgia | 10,000 | Clay | (Russia) Anastasia Myskina | (Ukraine) Anna Zaporozhanova; (Belarus) Vera Zhukovets | 3–6, 6–0, 6–4 |
| Win | 3–0 | Oct 1997 | ITF Batumi, Georgia | 10,000 | Hard | (Russia) Anastasia Myskina | (Slovakia) Danica Kováčová; (Ukraine) Irina Nossenko | 6–1, 1–0 ret. |
| Loss | 3–1 | Mar 1998 | ITF Buchen, Germany | 10,000 | Carpet (i) | (Poland) Anna Bieleń-Żarska | (Czech Republic) Jana Ondrouchová; (Slovakia) Andrea Šebová | 6–7, 1–6 |

== WTA Tour career earnings ==
Dementieva earned more than 14 million dollars during her career.

| Year | Grand Slam titles (Note: Includes singles, doubles and mixed doubles titles.) | WTA titles | Total titles | Earnings ($) | Money list rank |
|---|---|---|---|---|---|
| 1998 | 0 | 0 | 0 | 18,095 | 242 |
| 1999 | 0 | 0 | 0 | 107,247 | 88 |
| 2000 | 0 | 0 | 0 | 613,627 | 13 |
| 2001 | 0 | 0 | 0 | 567,964 | 18 |
| 2002 | 0 | 4 | 4 | 844,325 | 11 |
| 2003 | 0 | 4 | 4 | 869,740 | 12 |
| 2004 | 0 | 1 | 1 | 1,825,688 | 7 |
| 2005 | 0 | 1 | 1 | 1,524,461 | 7 |
| 2006 | 0 | 2 | 2 | 1,429,005 | 7 |
| 2007 | 0 | 2 | 2 | 863,241 | 14 |
| 2008 | 0 | 3 | 3 | 1,951,304 | 6 |
| 2009 | 0 | 3 | 3 | 2,343,481 | 7 |
| 2010 | 0 | 2 | 2 | 1,896,690 | 10 |
| Career | 0 | 22 | 22 | 14,867,436 | 32 |

== Record against other players ==
=== No. 1 wins ===
| # | Player | Event | Surface | Round | Score | Outcome |
|---|---|---|---|---|---|---|
| 1 | (Switzerland) Martina Hingis | 2001 Kremlin Cup | Carpet (i) | QF | 6–2, 6–2 | Finalist |
| 2 | (United States) Lindsay Davenport | 2005 US Open | Hard | QF | 6–1, 3–6, 7–6^{(8–6)} | Semifinalist |
| 3 | (United States) Serena Williams | 2010 Sydney International | Hard | F | 6–3, 6–2 | Winner |

=== Top 10 wins ===
| Season | 1999 | 2000 | 2001 | 2002 | 2003 | 2004 | 2005 | 2006 | 2007 | 2008 | 2009 | 2010 | Total |
| Wins | 1 | 4 | 3 | 1 | 9 | 7 | 5 | 4 | 3 | 7 | 6 | 6 | 56 |

| # | Player | vsRank | Event | Surface | Round | Score |
|---|---|---|---|---|---|---|
1999
| 1. | (United States) Venus Williams | 3 | Fed Cup, Stanford, United States | Hard | F | 1–6, 6–3, 7–6^{(7–5)} |
2000
| 2. | (France) Mary Pierce | 4 | Miami Open, United States | Hard | 2R | 6–3, 2–1, ret. |
| 3. | (Spain) Conchita Martínez | 7 | US Open | Hard | 3R | 6–4, 6–1 |
| 4. | (Germany) Anke Huber | 10 | US Open | Hard | QF | 6–1, 3–6, 6–3 |
| 5. | (United States) Lindsay Davenport | 2 | WTA Tour Championships, New York | Carpet (i) | 1R | 3–6, 7–6^{(9–7)}, 6–4 |
2001
| 6. | (United States) Lindsay Davenport | 2 | Miami Open, United States | Hard | QF | 6–3, 1–0, ret. |
| 7. | (Switzerland) Martina Hingis | 1 | Kremlin Cup, Russia | Carpet (i) | QF | 6–2, 6–2 |
| 8. | (France) Amélie Mauresmo | 9 | Fed Cup, Madrid, Spain | Clay (i) | RR | 6–3, 0–6, 6–4 |
2002
| 9. | (Switzerland) Martina Hingis | 10 | Stuttgart Open, Germany | Hard (i) | 2R | 6–3, 6–1 |
2003
| 10. | (Slovakia) Daniela Hantuchová | 5 | Open GDF Suez, France | Carpet (i) | QF | 7–5, 6–3 |
| 11. | (Slovakia) Daniela Hantuchová | 9 | Amelia Island Championships, United States | Clay | QF | 6–0, 6–1 |
| 12. | (Belgium) Justine Henin | 4 | Amelia Island Championships, United States | Clay | SF | 3–6, 6–4, 7–5 |
| 13. | (United States) Lindsay Davenport | 2 | Amelia Island Championships, United States | Clay | F | 4–6, 7–5, 6–3 |
| 14. | (Russia) Anastasia Myskina | 10 | Canadian Open | Hard | 3R | 2–6, 6–1, 6–1 |
| 15. | (France) Amélie Mauresmo | 6 | Canadian Open | Hard | QF | 3–6, 6–4, 6–2 |
| 16. | (United States) Chanda Rubin | 10 | Commonwealth Bank Bali Classic, Indonesia | Hard | F | 6–2, 6–1 |
| 17. | (United States) Chanda Rubin | 9 | China Open | Hard | F | 6–3, 7–6^{(8–6)} |
| 18. | (United States) Chanda Rubin | 10 | WTA Tour Championships, Los Angeles | Hard (i) | RR | 4–6, 7–5, 6–1 |
2004
| 19. | (United States) Lindsay Davenport | 4 | French Open | Clay | 4R | 6–1, 6–3 |
| 20. | (France) Amélie Mauresmo | 3 | French Open | Clay | QF | 6–4, 6–3 |
| 21. | (Russia) Svetlana Kuznetsova | 9 | LA Championships, United States | Hard | QF | 5–7, 6–2, 6–2 |
| 22. | (Russia) Vera Zvonareva | 10 | US Open | Hard | 4R | 1–6, 6–4, 6–3 |
| 23. | (France) Amélie Mauresmo | 2 | US Open | Hard | QF | 4–6, 6–4, 7–6^{(7–1)} |
| 24. | (United States) Jennifer Capriati | 8 | US Open | Hard | SF | 6–0, 2–6, 7–6^{(7–5)} |
| 25. | (Russia) Svetlana Kuznetsova | 5 | Kremlin Cup, Russia | Carpet (i) | QF | 6–1, 6–3 |
2005
| 26. | (Russia) Svetlana Kuznetsova | 7 | Indian Wells Open, United States | Hard | QF | 3–6, 6–3, 7–5 |
| 27. | (United States) Lindsay Davenport | 1 | US Open | Hard | QF | 6–1, 3–6, 7–6^{(8–6)} |
| 28. | (France) Mary Pierce | 6 | Fed Cup, Paris, France | Clay | F | 7–6^{(7–1)}, 2–6, 6–1 |
| 29. | (France) Amélie Mauresmo | 4 | Fed Cup, Paris, France | Clay | F | 6–4, 4–6, 6–2 |
| 30. | (Belgium) Kim Clijsters | 3 | Stuttgart Open, Germany | Hard (i) | QF | 6–3, 3–6, 6–2 |
2006
| 31. | (Belgium) Justine Henin | 3 | Indian Wells Open, United States | Hard | SF | 2–6, 7–5, 7–5 |
| 32. | (Belgium) Kim Clijsters | 2 | Fed Cup, Liège, Belgium | Clay (i) | QF | 6–4, 6–3 |
| 33. | (Russia) Maria Sharapova | 4 | LA Championships, United States | Hard | SF | 7–5, 6–2 |
| 34. | (Switzerland) Patty Schnyder | 9 | Kremlin Cup, Russia | Carpet (i) | QF | 7–6^{(8–6)}, 7–6^{(7–1)} |
2007
| 35. | (Slovakia) Daniela Hantuchová | 10 | LA Championships, United States | Hard | QF | 6–3, 4–1, ret. |
| 36. | (Slovakia) Daniela Hantuchová | 10 | Stuttgart Open, Germany | Hard (i) | 2R | 6–4, 6–4 |
| 37. | (United States) Serena Williams | 7 | Kremlin Cup, Russia | Hard (i) | F | 5–7, 6–1, 6–1 |
2008
| 38. | (Serbia) Ana Ivanovic | 2 | Dubai Championships, UAE | Hard | QF | 5–7, 6–3, 6–3 |
| 39. | (Russia) Svetlana Kuznetsova | 3 | Dubai Championships, UAE | Hard | F | 4–6, 6–3, 6–2 |
| 40. | (Serbia) Jelena Janković | 5 | Berlin Open, Germany | Clay | QF | 6–3, 2–6, 6–3 |
| 41. | (Serbia) Ana Ivanovic | 2 | Berlin Open, Germany | Clay | SF | 6–2, 7–5 |
| 42. | (United States) Serena Williams | 4 | Summer Olympics, China | Hard | QF | 3–6, 6–4, 6–3 |
| 43. | (Russia) Dinara Safina | 6 | Summer Olympics, China | Hard | F | 3–6, 7–5, 6–3 |
| 44. | (Russia) Dinara Safina | 2 | WTA Tour Championships, Doha, Qatar | Hard | RR | 6–2, 6–4 |
2009
| 45. | (Poland) Agnieszka Radwańska | 10 | Sydney International, Australia | Hard | QF | 6–2, 5–7, 6–4 |
| 46. | (United States) Serena Williams | 2 | Sydney International, Australia | Hard | SF | 6–3, 6–1 |
| 47. | (Russia) Dinara Safina | 3 | Sydney International, Australia | Hard | F | 6–3, 2–6, 6–1 |
| 48. | (Denmark) Caroline Wozniacki | 8 | Cincinnati Open, United States | Hard | QF | 6–2, 6–1 |
| 49. | (United States) Serena Williams | 2 | Canadian Open | Hard | SF | 7–6^{(7–2)}, 6–1 |
| 50. | (United States) Venus Williams | 7 | WTA Tour Championships, Doha, Qatar | Hard | RR | 3–6, 7–6^{(8–6)}, 6–2 |
2010
| 51. | (Russia) Dinara Safina | 2 | Sydney International, Australia | Hard | QF | 6–2, 6–3 |
| 52. | (Belarus) Victoria Azarenka | 7 | Sydney International, Australia | Hard | SF | 6–3, 6–1 |
| 53. | (United States) Serena Williams | 1 | Sydney International, Australia | Hard | F | 6–3, 6–2 |
| 54. | (Russia) Vera Zvonareva | 4 | Pan Pacific Open, Japan | Hard | QF | 7–5, 6–2 |
| 55. | (Italy) Francesca Schiavone | 8 | Pan Pacific Open, Japan | Hard | SF | 6–4, 7–5 |
| 56. | (Australia) Samantha Stosur | 7 | WTA Tour Championships, Doha, Qatar | Hard | RR | 4–6, 6–4, 7–6^{(7–4)} |
