= Daniela Hantuchová career statistics =

Career finals
Discipline	Type	Won	Lost	Total
Singles	Grand Slam	–	–	–
Singles	Summer Olympics	–	–	–
Singles	WTA Finals (Note: Formerly known as: Virginia Slims Championships (until 1995); WTA Tour Championships (until 2014))	–	–	–
Singles	WTA Elite (Note: Elite tier: WTA Tournament of Champions (2009–14); WTA Elite Trophy (2015–present))	–	–	–
Singles	WTA 1000 (Note: Formerly known as: Category 4 & 5 & 6 (until 1990); Tier I (until 2009); WTA Premier Mandatory and 5 (until 2021))	2	1	3
Singles	WTA 500 (Note: Formerly known as: Category 3 (until 1990); Tier II (until 2009); WTA Premier (until 2021))	1	5	6
Singles	WTA 250 (Note: Formerly known as: Category 1 & 2 (until 1990); Tier III & IV & V (until 2009); WTA International (until 2021))	4	3	7
Singles	Total	7	9	16
Doubles	Grand Slam	0	3	3
Doubles	Summer Olympics	–	–	–
Doubles	WTA Finals	–	–	–
Doubles	WTA Elite	–	–	–
Doubles	WTA 1000	2	5	7
Doubles	WTA 500	4	4	8
Doubles	WTA 250	3	0	3
Doubles	Total	9	12	21
Mixed doubles	Grand Slam	4	1	5
Mixed doubles	Total	4	1	5
Total		20	22	42

This is a list of the main career statistics of professional Slovak tennis player Daniela Hantuchová.

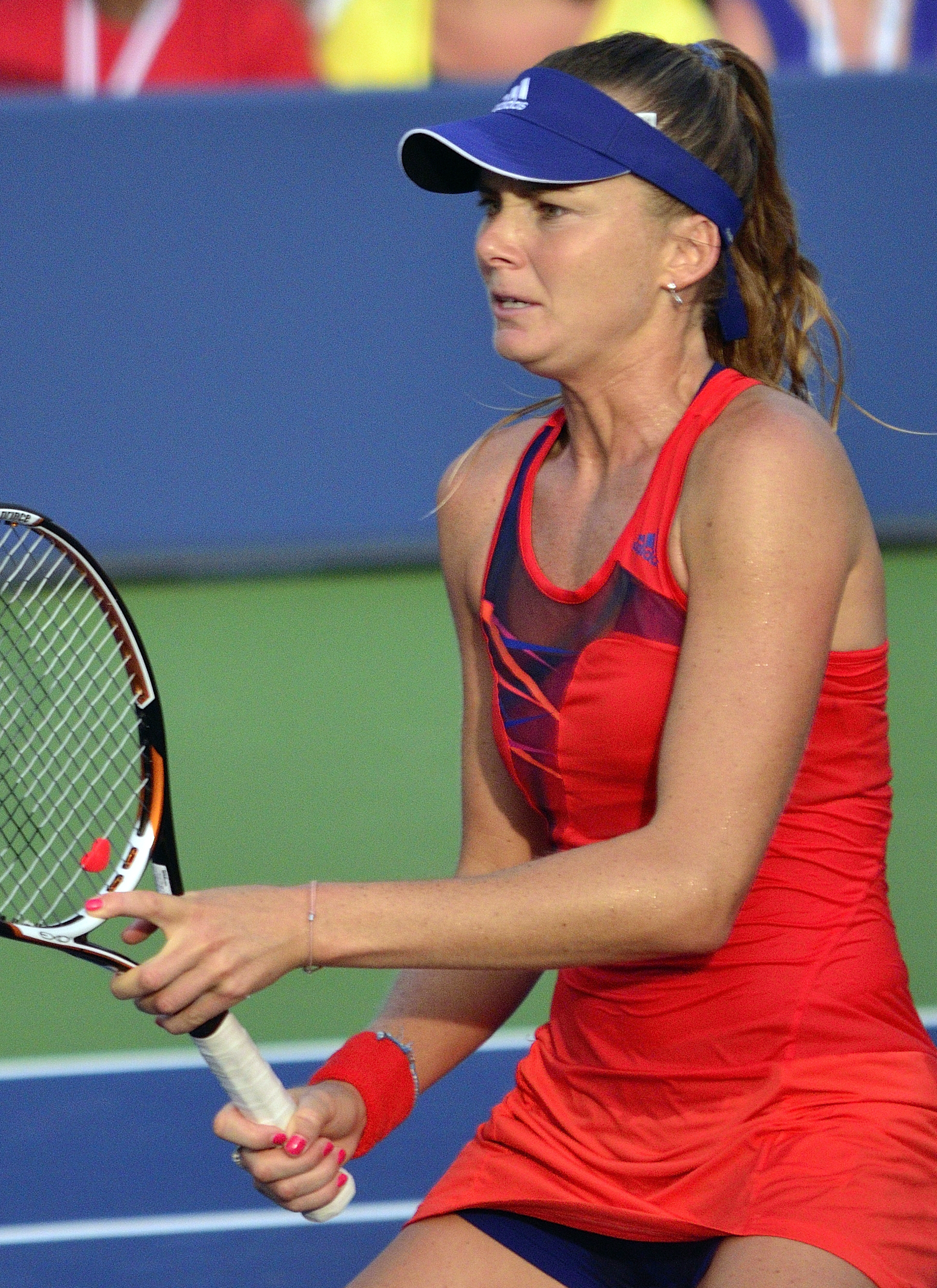
Hantuchová at the 2013 US Open.

== Performance timelines ==
Key
W	F	SF	QF	#R	RR	Q#	P#	DNQ	A	Z#	PO	G	S	B	NMS	NTI	P	NH

(W) winner; (F) finalist; (SF) semifinalist; (QF) quarterfinalist; (#R) rounds 4, 3, 2, 1; (RR) round-robin stage; (Q#) qualification round; (P#) preliminary round; (DNQ) did not qualify; (A) absent; (Z#) Davis/Fed Cup Zonal Group (with number indication) or (PO) play-off; (G) gold, (S) silver or (B) bronze Olympic/Paralympic medal; (NMS) not a Masters tournament; (NTI) not a Tier I tournament; (P) postponed; (NH) not held; (SR) strike rate (events won / competed); (W–L) win–loss record.

Only main-draw results in WTA Tour, Grand Slam tournaments, Billie Jean King Cup (Fed Cup), Hopman Cup and Olympic Games are included in win–loss records.

=== Singles ===
Tournament	1999	2000	2001	2002	2003	2004	2005	2006	2007	2008	2009	2010	2011	2012	2013	2014	2015	2016	2017	SR	W–L	Win %
Grand Slam tournaments
Australian Open	A	Q2	1R	3R	QF	2R	3R	4R	4R	SF	3R	3R	1R	3R	1R	3R	2R	1R	Q1	0 / 16	29–16	64%
French Open	A	A	2R	4R	2R	1R	3R	4R	3R	A	1R	4R	4R	A	1R	3R	1R	1R	A	0 / 14	20–14	59%
Wimbledon	A	Q2	2R	QF	2R	3R	3R	4R	4R	2R	4R	2R	3R	1R	1R	1R	2R	1R	A	0 / 16	24–16	60%
US Open	A	Q2	1R	QF	3R	3R	3R	2R	1R	1R	4R	3R	1R	1R	QF	2R	1R	A	—	0 / 15	21–15	58%
Win–loss	0–0	0–0	2–4	13–4	8–4	5–4	8–4	10–4	8–4	6–3	8–4	8–4	5–4	2–3	4–4	5–4	2–3	0–3	0–0	0 / 61	94–61	61%
National representation
Summer Olympics	NH	A	NH			2R	NH			2R	NH			3R	NH			A	NH	0 / 3	4–3	57%
Fed Cup	SF	RR	PO	W	QF	A	A	PO2	WG2	A	PO	PO	1R	PO	SF	1R	WG2	WG2	PO	1 / 7	32–14	70%
Year-end championships
WTA Finals	A	A	A	1R	A	A	A	A	RR	A	A	A	A	A	A	A	A	A	—	0 / 2	1–3	25%
WTA Elite Trophy	NH										A	4th	1R	RR	A	A	A	A	—	0 / 3	1–6	14%
WTA 1000 + former^{†} tournaments
Dubai / Qatar Open (Note: The first Premier 5 event of the year has switched back and forth between the Dubai Tennis Championships and the Qatar Total Open since 2009. Dubai was classified as a Premier 5 event from 2009 to 2011 before being succeeded by Doha for the 2012–2014 period. In 2015, Dubai regained its Premier 5 status while Doha was demoted to Premier status. The Premier 5 tournaments were reclassified as WTA 1000 tournaments in 2021.)	NMS/NH									A	3R	3R	1R	1R	3R	1R	2R	Q1	A	0 / 7	7–7	50%
Indian Wells Open	A	A	1R	W	4R	2R	3R	A	W	QF	4R	2R	2R	2R	2R	2R	1R	1R	Q1	2 / 15	21–13	62%
Miami Open	A	1R	1R	2R	2R	3R	2R	3R	3R	3R	2R	4R	3R	3R	2R	2R	1R	A	A	0 / 16	10–16	38%
Madrid Open	NH										2R	1R	2R	A	3R	1R	1R	A	A	0 / 6	4–6	40%
Italian Open	A	A	3R	1R	3R	1R	1R	1R	SF	A	2R	1R	3R	A	Q2	1R	1R	A	A	0 / 12	10–12	45%
Canadian Open	A	A	2R	SF	3R	2R	1R	3R	A	A	1R	1R	2R	1R	A	1R	A	A	—	0 / 11	9–11	45%
Cincinnati Open	NMS/NH										QF	1R	QF	2R	1R	1R	1R	A	—	0 / 7	7–7	50%
Pan Pacific / Wuhan Open (Note: In 2014, the Toray Pan Pacific Open was downgraded to a Premier event and replaced by the Wuhan Open. The Premier 5 tournaments were reclassified as WTA 1000 tournaments in 2021.)	A	A	A	A	A	QF	QF	2R	1R	1R	2R	2R	A	2R	1R	1R	1R	A	—	0 / 11	8–11	42%
China Open	NMS/NH										2R	1R	2R	1R	1R	1R	Q1	A	—	0 / 6	2–6	25%
Charleston Open^{†}	A	A	A	2R	QF	A	A	A	A	A	NMS									0 / 2	3–2	60%
German Open^{†}	A	A	Q2	QF	QF	1R	1R	3R	1R	A	NH									0 / 6	6–6	50%
Southern California Open^{†}	NMS					2R	2R	3R	3R	NMS/NH										0 / 4	5–4	56%
Kremlin Cup^{†}	A	A	A	A	A	1R	A	A	A	2R	NMS									0 / 2	1–2	33%
Zurich Open^{†}	A	A	QF	QF	1R	2R	2R	F	2R	NMS/NH										0 / 7	11–7	61%
Win–loss																						
Career statistics
	1999	2000	2001	2002	2003	2004	2005	2006	2007	2008	2009	2010	2011	2012	2013	2014	2015	2016	2017	SR	W–L	Win %
Tournaments	1	7	16	25	23	25	25	25	27	20	24	24	26	22	25	24	20	9	1	Career total: 369		
Titles	0	0	0	1	0	0	0	0	2	0	0	0	1	1	1	0	1	0	0	Career total: 7		
Finals	0	0	0	2	0	1	1	1	4	0	0	1	2	2	1	0	1	0	0	Career total: 16		
Hardcourt win–loss	0–1	5–6	9–10	37–17	17–17	17–19	35–19	28–19	38–19	21–18	25–17	25–19	20–18	22–19	17–17	6–17	11–12	0–6	0–0	6 / 262	333–270	55%
Clay win–loss	0–0	2–2	8–5	11–7	10–6	2–5	3–4	7–3	8–6	0–1	9–7	8–4	12–8	1–1	3–6	7–5	1–4	0–1	2–1	0 / 67	94–76	55%
Grass win–loss	0–0	0–0	5–2	6–2	2–2	6–3	2–3	3–2	8–3	1–1	5–2	2–2	9–3	3–4	6–2	2–3	4–3	1–2	0–0	1 / 40	65–39	63%
Overall win–loss	0–1	7–8	22–17	54–26	29–25	25–27	40–26	38–24	54–28	22–20	39–26	35–25	41–29	26–24	26–25	15–25	16–19	1–9	2–1	7 / 369	492–385	56%
Year-end ranking	201	108	37	8	19	31	19	18	9	21	24	30	24	32	33	64	81	228	Ret.	$10,436,407		

=== Doubles ===
Tournament	1999	2000	2001	2002	2003	2004	2005	2006	2007	2008	2009	2010	2011	2012	2013	2014	2015	2016	SR	W–L	Win %
Grand Slam tournaments
Australian Open	A	A	1R	F	QF	1R	QF	3R	QF	3R	F	A	A	3R	1R	3R	2R	A	0 / 13	28–13	68%
French Open	A	A	3R	1R	SF	2R	2R	F	A	A	3R	2R	1R	A	1R	1R	3R	A	0 / 12	18–12	60%
Wimbledon	A	A	3R	2R	2R	2R	QF	1R	1R	A	2R	3R	3R	2R	2R	2R	2R	1R	0 / 15	17–15	53%
US Open	A	A	1R	1R	3R	1R	3R	2R	3R	3R	3R	2R	SF	1R	1R	1R	A	A	0 / 14	16–14	53%
Win–loss	0–0	0–0	4–4	7–4	9–4	2–4	9–4	8–4	5–3	4–2	10–4	4–3	6–3	3–3	1–4	3–4	4–3	0–1	0 / 54	79–54	59%
National representation
Summer Olympics	NH	A	NH			1R	NH			1R	NH			1R	NH			A	0 / 3	0–3	0%
WTA 1000 + former^{†} tournaments
Dubai / Qatar Open	NMS/NH									A	A	1R	QF	1R	QF	A	A	1R	0 / 5	4–5	44%
Indian Wells Open	A	A	A	SF	1R	1R	2R	A	A	SF	1R	A	SF	A	QF	2R	QF	A	0 / 10	15–10	60%
Miami Open	A	A	A	1R	1R	1R	1R	QF	SF	QF	1R	A	W	2R	2R	1R	2R	A	1 / 13	15–13	54%
Madrid Open	NH										QF	A	1R	A	1R	1R	A	A	0 / 4	2–4	33%
Italian Open	A	A	SF	A	2R	2R	QF	W	2R	A	F	A	2R	A	1R	2R	2R	A	1 / 11	19–10	66%
Canadian Open	A	A	QF	QF	QF	A	SF	A	A	A	SF	2R	A	2R	2R	1R	A	A	0 / 9	11–9	55%
Cincinnati Open	NMS/NH										QF	A	1R	2R	2R	2R	A	A	0 / 5	4–5	44%
Pan Pacific / Wuhan Open	A	A	A	A	A	1R	A	QF	1R	QF	F	A	A	1R	1R	2R	1R	A	0 / 9	6–9	40%
China Open	NMS/NH										A	A	QF	2R	QF	A	A	A	0 / 3	5–3	63%
Charleston Open^{†}	A	A	A	SF	2R	A	A	A	A	A	NMS								0 / 2	1–2	33%
German Open^{†}	A	A	A	F	QF	1R	SF	QF	A	A	NH								0 / 5	9–5	64%
Southern California Open^{†}	NMS					2R	F	QF	A	NMS/NH									0 / 3	6–3	67%
Kremlin Cup^{†}	A	A	A	A	A	1R	A	A	A	A	NMS								0 / 1	0–1	0%
Zurich Open^{†}	A	A	1R	SF	A	QF	F	SF	1R	NMS/NH									0 / 6	8–6	57%
Career statistics
	1999	2000	2001	2002	2003	2004	2005	2006	2007	2008	2009	2010	2011	2012	2013	2014	2015	2016	SR	W–L	Win %
Tournaments	1	6	15	20	19	21	19	18	11	12	15	7	12	18	23	16	9	4	Career total: 246		
Titles	0	1	1	2	0	0	2	2	0	0	0	0	1	0	0	0	0	0	Career total: 9		
Finals	0	1	1	7	0	0	4	4	0	0	3	0	1	0	0	0	0	0	Career total: 21		
Overall win–loss	1–1	3–5	19–14	36–18	17–19	9–21	37–17	30–15	15–7	13–11	25–14	6–6	20–11	11–17	18–21	9–15	8–9	1–4	287–233		
Year-end ranking	279	192	56	8	28	62	13	13	44	54	13	93	18	66	49	87	82	543	No. 5		

=== Mixed doubles ===
Tournament	2001	2002	2003	2004	2005	2006	2007	2008	2009	2010	2011	2012	2013	2014	SR	W–L	Win %
Australian Open	A	W	SF	2R	1R	A	1R	A	A	2R	A	A	2R	QF	1 / 8	13–7	65%
French Open	A	QF	1R	SF	W	A	A	A	A	A	A	A	2R	A	1 / 5	11–4	73%
Wimbledon	W	F	3R	2R	A	A	A	A	A	A	A	1R	1R	A	1 / 6	13–5	72%
US Open	A	2R	1R	1R	W	A	A	A	A	1R	2R	1R	A	A	1 / 6	7–4	64%
Win–loss																	

== Significant finals ==
=== Grand Slams ===
==== Doubles: 3 (3 runner-ups) ====
Result	Year	Championship	Surface	Partner	Opponents	Score
Loss	2002	Australian Open	Hard	(Spain) Arantxa Sánchez Vicario	(Switzerland) Martina Hingis (Russia) Anna Kournikova	2–6, 7–6^{(7–4)}, 1–6
Loss	2006	French Open	Clay	(Japan) Ai Sugiyama	(United States) Lisa Raymond (Australia) Samantha Stosur	3–6, 2–6
Loss	2009	Australian Open (2)	Hard	(Japan) Ai Sugiyama	(United States) Serena Williams (United States) Venus Williams	3–6, 3–6

==== Mixed doubles: 5 (4 titles, 1 runner-up) ====
By winning the 2005 US Open title, Hantuchová completed the mixed doubles Career Grand Slam. She became only the fifth female player in history to achieve this.

Result	Year	Championship	Surface	Partner	Opponents	Score
Win	2001	Wimbledon	Grass	(Czech Republic) Leoš Friedl	(United States) Mike Bryan (South Africa) Liezel Huber	4–6, 6–3, 6–2
Win	2002	Australian Open	Hard	(Zimbabwe) Kevin Ullyett	(Argentina) Gastón Etlis (Argentina) Paola Suárez	6–3, 6–2
Loss	2002	Wimbledon	Grass	(Zimbabwe) Kevin Ullyett	(Russia) Elena Likhovtseva (India) Mahesh Bhupathi	2–6, 6–1, 1–6
Win	2005	French Open	Clay	(France) Fabrice Santoro	(India) Leander Paes (United States) Martina Navratilova	3–6, 6–3, 6–2
Win	2005	US Open	Hard	(India) Mahesh Bhupathi	(Serbia and Montenegro) Nenad Zimonjić (Slovenia) Katarina Srebotnik	6–4, 6–2

=== WTA 1000 finals ===
==== Singles: 3 (2 titles, 1 runner-up) ====
Result	Year	Tournament	Surface	Opponent	Score
Win	2002	Indian Wells Open	Hard	(Switzerland) Martina Hingis	6–3, 6–4
Loss	2006	Zurich Open	Hard (i)	(Russia) Maria Sharapova	1–6, 6–4, 3–6
Win	2007	Indian Wells Open (2)	Hard	(Russia) Svetlana Kuznetsova	6–3, 6–4

==== Doubles: 7 (2 titles, 5 runner-ups) ====
Result	Year	Tournament	Surface	Partner	Opponents	Score
Loss	2002	German Open	Clay	(Spain) Arantxa Sánchez Vicario	(Russia) Elena Dementieva (Slovakia) Janette Husárová	6–0, 6–7^{(3–7)}, 2–6
Loss	2005	Southern California Open	Hard	(Japan) Ai Sugiyama	(Spain) Conchita Martínez (Spain) Virginia Ruano Pascual	7–6^{(9–7)}, 1–6, 5–7
Loss	2005	Zurich Open	Hard (i)	(Japan) Ai Sugiyama	(Zimbabwe) Cara Black (Australia) Rennae Stubbs	7–6^{(8–6)}, 6–7^{(4–7)}, 3–6
Win	2006	Italian Open	Clay	(Japan) Ai Sugiyama	(Czech Republic) Květa Peschke (Italy) Francesca Schiavone	3–6, 6–3, 6–1
Loss	2009	Italian Open	Clay	(Japan) Ai Sugiyama	(Chinese Taipei) Hsieh Su-wei (China) Peng Shuai	5–7, 6–7^{(5–7)}
Loss	2009	Pan Pacific Open	Hard	(Japan) Ai Sugiyama	(Russia) Alisa Kleybanova (Italy) Francesca Schiavone	4–6, 2–6
Win	2011	Miami Open	Hard	(Poland) Agnieszka Radwańska	(United States) Liezel Huber (Russia) Nadia Petrova	7–6^{(7–5)}, 2–6, [10–8]

== WTA Tour finals ==
=== Singles: 16 (7 titles, 9 runner-ups) ===
Legend WTA 1000 (Tier I) (2–1) WTA 500 (Tier II / Premier) (1–5) WTA 250 (Tier III / International) (4–3)	Finals by surface Hard (6–7) Grass (1–2)

Result	W–L	Date	Tournament	Tier	Surface	Opponent	Score
Win	1–0	Mar 2002	Indian Wells Open, United States	Tier I	Hard	(Switzerland) Martina Hingis	6–3, 6–4
Loss	1–1	Oct 2002	Stuttgart Open, Germany	Tier II	Hard (i)	(Belgium) Kim Clijsters	6–4, 3–6, 4–6
Loss	1–2	Jun 2004	Eastbourne International, United Kingdom	Tier II	Grass	(Russia) Svetlana Kuznetsova	6–2, 6–7^{(2–7)}, 4–6
Loss	1–3	Aug 2005	LA Championships, United States	Tier II	Hard	(Belgium) Kim Clijsters	4–6, 1–6
Loss	1–4	Oct 2006	Zurich Open, Switzerland	Tier I	Hard (i)	(Russia) Maria Sharapova	1–6, 6–4, 3–6
Win	2–4	Mar 2007	Indian Wells Open, United States (2)	Tier I	Hard	(Russia) Svetlana Kuznetsova	6–3, 6–4
Loss	2–5	Sep 2007	Commonwealth Bank Classic, Indonesia	Tier III	Hard	(United States) Lindsay Davenport	4–6, 6–3, 2–6
Loss	2–6	Sep 2007	Luxembourg Open, Luxembourg	Tier II	Hard (i)	(Serbia) Ana Ivanovic	6–3, 4–6, 4–6
Win	3–6	Oct 2007	Linz Open, Austria	Tier II	Hard (i)	(Switzerland) Patty Schnyder	6–4, 6–2
Loss	3–7	Mar 2010	Monterrey Open, Mexico	International	Hard	(Russia) Anastasia Pavlyuchenkova	6–1, 1–6, 0–6
Win	4–7	Feb 2011	Thailand Open, Thailand	International	Hard	(Italy) Sara Errani	6–0, 6–2
Loss	4–8	Jun 2011	Birmingham Classic, United Kingdom	International	Grass	(Germany) Sabine Lisicki	3–6, 2–6
Loss	4–9	Jan 2012	Brisbane International, Australia	Premier	Hard	(Estonia) Kaia Kanepi	2–6, 1–6
Win	5–9	Feb 2012	Thailand Open, Thailand (2)	International	Hard	(Russia) Maria Kirilenko	6–7^{(4–7)}, 6–3, 6–3
Win	6–9	Jun 2013	Birmingham Classic, United Kingdom	International	Grass	(Croatia) Donna Vekić	7–6^{(7–5)}, 6–4
Win	7–9	Feb 2015	Thailand Open, Thailand (3)	International	Hard	(Croatia) Ajla Tomljanović	3–6, 6–3, 6–4

=== Doubles: 21 (9 titles, 12 runner-ups) ===
Legend Grand Slam tournaments (0–3) WTA 1000 (Tier I / Premier M / Premier 5) (2–5) WTA 500 (Tier II) (4–4) WTA 250 (Tier III / Tier IV / International) (3–0)	Finals by surface Hard (6–8) Grass (1–0) Clay (2–4)

Result	W–L	Date	Tournament	Tier	Surface	Partner	Opponents	Score
Win	1–0	Oct 2000	WTA Bratislava, Slovakia	Tier IV	Hard (i)	(Slovakia) Karina Habšudová	(Hungary) Petra Mandula (Austria) Patricia Wartusch	w/o
Win	2–0	Oct 2001	Luxembourg Open, Luxembourg	Tier III	Hard (i)	(Russia) Elena Bovina	(Germany) Bianka Lamade (Switzerland) Patty Schnyder	6–3, 6–3
Loss	2–1	Jan 2002	Australian Open, Australia	Grand Slam	Hard	(Spain) Arantxa Sánchez Vicario	(Russia) Anna Kournikova (Switzerland) Martina Hingis	2–6, 7–6^{(7–4)}, 1–6
Win	3–1	Apr 2002	Amelia Island Championships, United States	Tier II	Clay	(Spain) Arantxa Sánchez Vicario	(Argentina) María Emilia Salerni (Sweden) Åsa Svensson	6–4, 6–2
Loss	3–2	May 2002	Hamburg Open, Germany	Tier II	Clay	(Spain) Arantxa Sánchez Vicario	(Switzerland) Martina Hingis (Austria) Barbara Schett	1–6, 1–6
Loss	3–3	May 2002	Berlin Open, Germany	Tier I	Clay	(Spain) Arantxa Sánchez Vicario	(Russia) Elena Dementieva (Slovakia) Janette Husárová	6–0, 6–7^{(3–7)}, 2–6
Loss	3–4	Aug 2002	San Diego Classic, United States	Tier II	Hard	(Japan) Ai Sugiyama	(Russia) Elena Dementieva (Slovakia) Janette Husárová	2–6, 4–6
Loss	3–5	Aug 2002	LA Championships, United States	Tier II	Hard	(Japan) Ai Sugiyama	(Belgium) Kim Clijsters (Federal Republic of Yugoslavia) Jelena Dokić	3–6, 3–6
Win	4–5	Aug 2002	Connecticut Open, United States	Tier II	Hard	(Spain) Arantxa Sánchez Vicario	(Italy) Tathiana Garbin (Slovakia) Janette Husárová	6–3, 1–6, 7–5
Win	5–5	Jun 2005	Birmingham Classic, United Kingdom	Tier III	Grass	(Japan) Ai Sugiyama	(Greece) Eleni Daniilidou (United States) Jennifer Russell	6–2, 6–3
Loss	5–6	Aug 2005	Southern California Open, United States (2)	Tier I	Hard	(Japan) Ai Sugiyama	(Spain) Conchita Martínez (Spain) Virginia Ruano Pascual	7–6^{(9–7)}, 1–6, 5–7
Win	6–6	Oct 2005	Stuttgart Open, Germany	Tier II	Hard (i)	(Russia) Anastasia Myskina	(Czech Republic) Květa Peschke (Italy) Francesca Schiavone	6–0, 3–6, 7–5
Loss	6–7	Oct 2005	Zurich Open, Switzerland	Tier I	Hard (i)	(Japan) Ai Sugiyama	(Zimbabwe) Cara Black (Australia) Rennae Stubbs	7–6^{(8–6)}, 6–7^{(4–7)}, 3–6
Win	7–7	Mar 2006	Qatar Open, Qatar	Tier II	Hard	(Japan) Ai Sugiyama	(China) Ting Li (China) Sun Tiantian	6–4, 6–4
Win	8–7	May 2006	Italian Open, Italy	Tier I	Clay	(Japan) Ai Sugiyama	(Czech Republic) Květa Peschke (Italy) Francesca Schiavone	3–6, 6–3, 6–1
Loss	8–8	Jun 2006	French Open, France	Grand Slam	Clay	(Japan) Ai Sugiyama	(United States) Lisa Raymond (Australia) Samantha Stosur	3–6, 2–6
Loss	8–9	Aug 2006	LA Championships, United States	Tier II	Hard	(Japan) Ai Sugiyama	(Spain) Virginia Ruano Pascual (Argentina) Paola Suárez	3–6, 4–6
Loss	8–10	Jan 2009	Australian Open, Australia	Grand Slam	Hard	(Japan) Ai Sugiyama	(United States) Serena Williams (United States) Venus Williams	3–6, 3–6
Loss	8–11	May 2009	Italian Open, Italy	Premier 5	Clay	(Japan) Ai Sugiyama	(Chinese Taipei) Hsieh Su-wei (China) Peng Shuai	5–7, 6–7^{(5–7)}
Loss	8–12	Oct 2009	Pan Pacific Open, Japan	Premier 5	Hard (i)	(Japan) Ai Sugiyama	(Russia) Alisa Kleybanova (Italy) Francesca Schiavone	4–6, 2–6
Win	9–12	Apr 2011	Miami Open, United States	Premier M	Hard	(Poland) Agnieszka Radwańska	(United States) Liezel Huber (Russia) Nadia Petrova	7–6^{(7–5)}, 2–6, [10–8]

== ITF Circuit finals ==
=== Singles: 3 titles ===
Legend
$50,000 tournaments
$25,000 tournaments

Result	W–L	Date	Tournament	Tier	Surface	Opponent	Score
Win	1–0	May 1999	ITF Jackson, United States	25,000	Clay	(Venezuela) Milagros Sequera	6–2, 6–1
Win	2–0	Sep 1999	ITF Fano, Italy	25,000	Clay	(Italy) Flora Perfetti	6–4, 6–7, 6–2
Win	3–0	Aug 2000	ITF Bronx, United States	50,000	Hard	(China) Yi Jing-Qian	6–4, 6–4

=== Doubles: 1 title ===
Legend
$25,000 tournaments

Result	W–L	Date	Tournament	Tier	Surface	Partner	Opponent	Score
Win	1–0	Jul 1999	ITF Civitanova, Italy	25,000	Clay	(Denmark) Eva Dyrberg	(Spain) Rosa María Andrés Rodríguez; (Spain) Conchita Martínez Granados	7–6, 4–6, 6–3

== Billie Jean King Cup (Fed Cup) results ==
=== Singles ===
Year	Round	Date	Location	Against	Surface	Opponent	Score	W/L
2000	WG RR	Apr 2000	Bratislava, Slovakia	Czech Republic	Hard	Květa Peschke	6–4, 6–2	W
2000	WG RR	Apr 2000	Bratislava, Slovakia	Austria	Hard	Marion Maruska	4–6, 6–7^{(1–7)}	L
2001	WG PO	Apr 2001	Bratislava, Slovakia	Hungary	Clay	Rita Kuti-Kis	6–4, 6–4	W
2001	WG PO	Apr 2001	Bratislava, Slovakia	Hungary	Clay	Petra Mandula	6–3, 6–4	W
2001	WG PO	Jul 2001	Bratislava, Slovakia	Russia	Clay	Elena Dementieva	2–6, 6–7^{(6–8)}	L
2001	WG PO	Jul 2001	Bratislava, Slovakia	Russia	Clay	Elena Likhovtseva	6–1, 6–3	W
2002	WG 1R	Apr 2002	Bratislava, Slovakia	Switzerland	Clay	Myriam Casanova	6–4, 7–5	W
2002	WG 1R	Apr 2002	Bratislava, Slovakia	Switzerland	Clay	Patty Schnyder	3–6, 3–6	L
2002	WG QF	Jul 2002	Bratislava, Slovakia	France	Carpet	Nathalie Dechy	7–5, 7–5	W
2002	WG QF	Jul 2002	Bratislava, Slovakia	France	Carpet	Amélie Mauresmo	2–6, 6–4, 6–3	W
2002	WG SF	Oct 2002	Gran Canaria, Spain	Italy	Hard	Francesca Schiavone	6–7^{(1–7)}, 1–6	L
2002	WG SF	Oct 2002	Gran Canaria, Spain	Italy	Hard	Silvia Farina Elia	7–5, 6–3	W
2002	WG F	Nov 2002	Gran Canaria, Spain	Spain	Hard	Magüi Serna	6–2, 6–1	W
2002	WG F	Nov 2002	Gran Canaria, Spain	Spain	Hard	Conchita Martínez	6–7^{(8–10)}, 7–5, 6–4	W
2003	WG 1R	Apr 2003	Ettenheim, Germany	Germany	Clay	Marlene Weingärtner	2–6, 7–6^{(7–5)}, 7–5	W
2003	WG 1R	Apr 2003	Ettenheim, Germany	Germany	Clay	Anca Barna	2–6, 6–3, 6–1	W
2006	Z1 RR	Apr 2006	Plovdiv, Bulgaria	Luxembourg	Clay	Anne Kremer	6–3, 6–3	W
2006	Z1 RR	Apr 2006	Plovdiv, Bulgaria	Netherlands	Clay	Michaëlla Krajicek	4–6, 7–6^{(7–5)}, 6–2	W
2006	Z1 PO	Apr 2006	Plovdiv, Bulgaria	(United Kingdom) Great Britain	Clay	Anne Keothavong	6–2, 6–1	W
2006	WG2 PO	Jul 2006	Bratislava, Slovakia	Thailand	Hard	Montinee Tangphong	6–1, 6–1	W
2006	WG2 PO	Jul 2006	Bratislava, Slovakia	Thailand	Hard	Suchanun Viratprasert	6–1, 6–3	W
2007	WG2 QF	Apr 2007	Bratislava, Slovakia	Czech Republic	Clay	Lucie Šafářová	6–7^{(1–7)}, 6–4, 6–3	L
2007	WG2 QF	Apr 2007	Bratislava, Slovakia	Czech Republic	Clay	Nicole Vaidišová	2–6, 7–6^{(7–1)}, 3–6	L
2007	WG2 PO	Jul 2007	Košice, Slovakia	Serbia	Hard	Ana Timotic	6–1, 6–2	W
2007	WG2 PO	Jul 2007	Košice, Slovakia	Serbia	Hard	Vojislava Lukic	6–0, 6–2	W
2009	WG2 QF	Feb 2009	Bratislava, Slovakia	Belgium	Hard	Yanina Wickmayer	7–6^{(7–2)}, 6–3	W
2009	WG PO	Apr 2009	Limoges, France	France	Clay	Alizé Cornet	6–7^{(2–7)}, 6–3, 6–4	W
2009	WG PO	Apr 2009	Limoges, France	France	Clay	Amélie Mauresmo	5–7, 4–6	L
2010	WG2 QF	Feb 2010	Bratislava, Slovakia	China	Hard	Shuai Zhang	6–0, 6–1	W
2010	WG PO	Apr 2010	Belgrade, Serbia	Serbia	Clay	Bojana Jovanovski	6–2, 6–2	W
2010	WG PO	Apr 2010	Belgrade, Serbia	Serbia	Clay	Jelena Janković	7–6^{(7–2)}, 7–5	W
2011	WG QF	Feb 2011	Bratislava, Slovakia	Czech Republic	Hard	Lucie Šafářová	5–7, 1–6	L
2011	WG QF	Feb 2011	Bratislava, Slovakia	Czech Republic	Hard	Petra Kvitová	4–6, 2–6	L
2011	WG PO	Apr 2011	Bratislava, Slovakia	Serbia	Clay	Ana Ivanovic	2–6, 4–6	L
2011	WG PO	Apr 2011	Bratislava, Slovakia	Serbia	Clay	Jelena Janković	2–6, 6–3, 5–7	L
2012	WG2 QF	Feb 2012	Bratislava, Slovakia	France	Hard	Pauline Parmentier	5–7, 6–1, 9–7	W
2012	WG2 QF	Feb 2012	Bratislava, Slovakia	France	Hard	Alizé Cornet	6–3, 6–4	W
2012	WG PO	Apr 2012	Marbella, Spain	Spain	Clay	Sílvia Soler Espinosa	6–7^{(5–7)}, 4–6	L
2012	WG PO	Apr 2012	Marbella, Spain	Spain	Clay	Lourdes Domínguez Lino	0–6, 7–6^{(7–4)}, 6–4	W
2013	WG QF	Feb 2013	Niš, Serbia	Serbia	Hard	Bojana Jovanovski	7–5, 6–2	W
2013	WG QF	Feb 2013	Niš, Serbia	Serbia	Hard	Vesna Dolonc	6–3, 6–2	W
2013	WG SF	Apr 2013	Moscow, Russia	Russia	Clay	Maria Kirilenko	6–2, 6–4	W
2013	WG SF	Apr 2013	Moscow, Russia	Russia	Clay	Vesna Dolonc	3–6, 6–4, 4–6	L
2014	WG QF	Feb 2014	Bratislava, Slovakia	Germany	Hard	Angelique Kerber	6–7^{(7–9)}, 1–6	L
2015	WG2 PO	Apr 2015	Bratislava, Slovakia	Sweden	Clay	Susanne Celik	6–2, 6–0	W

=== Doubles ===
Year	Round	Date	Location	Against	Surface	Partnering	Opponent(s)	Score	W/L
1999	WG SF	July 1999	Moscow, Russia	Russia	Clay	Ľudmila Cervanová	Elena Dementieva; Elena Makarova	7–5, 7–6^{(7–5)}	W
2000	WG RR	Apr 2000	Bratislava, Slovakia	Switzerland	Hard	Karina Habšudová	Patty Schnyder; Miroslava Vavrinec	6–7^{(8–10)}, 6–2, 7–5	W
2000	WG RR	Apr 2000	Bratislava, Slovakia	Czech Republic	Hard	Karina Habšudová	Dája Bedáňová; Květa Peschke	5–7, 3–6	L
2001	WG PO	Apr 2001	Bratislava, Slovakia	Hungary	Clay	Karina Habšudová	Anikó Kapros; Petra Mandula	2–6, 7–5, 5–7	L
2002	WG 1R	Apr 2002	Bratislava, Slovakia	Switzerland	Clay	Janette Husárová	Myriam Casanova; Patty Schnyder	6–0, 6–7^{(4–7)}, 6–3	W
2006	Z1 RR	Apr 2006	Plovdiv, Bulgaria	Luxembourg	Clay	Janette Husárová	Mandy Minella; Claudine Schaul	6–2, 6–4	W
2009	WG PO	Apr 2009	Limoges, France	France	Clay	Dominika Cibulková	Nathalie Dechy; Amélie Mauresmo	6–4, 1–6, 4–6	L
2010	WG PO	Apr 2010	Belgrade, Serbia	Serbia	Clay	Magdaléna Rybáriková	Jelena Janković; Bojana Jovanovski	6–4, 6–3	W
2011	WG PO	Apr 2011	Bratislava, Slovakia	Serbia	Clay	Magdaléna Rybáriková	Jelena Janković; Aleksandra Krunić	2–6, 5–7, 7–9	L
2013	WG SF	Apr 2013	Moscow, Russia	Russia	Clay	Dominika Cibulková	Ekaterina Makarova; Elena Vesnina	6–4, 3–6, 1–6	L

== WTA Tour career earnings ==
Hantuchová earned more than 10 million dollars during her career.

Year	Grand Slam singles titles	WTA singles titles	Total singles titles	Earnings ($)	Money list rank
2001	0	0	0	252,296	39
2002	0	1	1	1,188,379	7
2003	0	0	0	579,804	16
2004	0	0	0	527,063	22
2005	0	0	0	797,787	15
2006	0	0	0	710,720	17
2007	0	2	2	1,205,487	10
2008	0	0	0	614,474	25
2009	0	0	0	720,303	23
2010	0	0	0	555,619	37
2011	0	1	1	809,682	24
2012	0	1	1	465,760	41
2013	0	1	1	782,552	29
2014	0	0	0	531,411	50
2015	0	1	1	426,882	69
Career	0	7	7	10,436,407	56

== Top 10 wins ==
Season	2000	2001	2002	2003	2004	2005	2006	2007	2008	2009	2010	2011	2012	2013	Total
Wins	1	1	6	0	1	3	4	6	0	1	3	5	0	2	33

#	Player	vsRank	Event	Surface	Round	Score
2000
1.	(France) Nathalie Tauziat	7	Luxembourg Open, Luxembourg	Hard (i)	2R	2–6, 6–3, 6–4
2001
2.	(South Africa) Amanda Coetzer	10	U.S. National Indoor Championships, US	Hard (i)	2R	7–6^{(7–0)}, 3–6, 6–0
2002
3.	(Belgium) Justine Henin	7	Indian Wells Open, United States	Hard	4R	6–3, 6–3
4.	(Switzerland) Martina Hingis	4	Indian Wells Open, United States	Hard	F	6–3, 6–4
5.	(Federal Republic of Yugoslavia) Jelena Dokić	9	German Open, Germany	Clay	3R	6–2, 6–3
6.	(Federal Republic of Yugoslavia) Jelena Dokić	7	Wimbledon, United Kingdom	Grass	4R	6–4, 7–5
7.	(France) Amélie Mauresmo	10	Fed Cup, Bratislava, Slovak Republic	Carpet (i)	RR	2–6, 6–4, 6–3
8.	(Belgium) Justine Henin	6	US Open, United States	Hard	4R	6–1, 3–6, 7–6^{(7–4)}
2004
9.	(France) Amélie Mauresmo	4	Eastbourne International, United Kingdom	Grass	SF	4–6, 6–4, 6–4
2005
10.	(Australia) Alicia Molik	8	Dubai Championships, UAE	Hard	1R	7–6^{(10–8)}, 6–2
11.	(Russia) Elena Dementieva	6	LA Championships, US	Hard	SF	6–3, 6–4
12.	(Switzerland) Patty Schnyder	10	Stuttgart Open, Germany	Hard (i)	2R	6–4, 6–3
2006
13.	(Switzerland) Patty Schnyder	7	Sydney International, Australia	Hard	2R	3–6, 6–3, 6–4
14.	(Russia) Dinara Safina	10	Stuttgart Open, Germany	Hard (i)	2R	6–2, 6–2
15.	(Switzerland) Patty Schnyder	8	Zurich Open, Switzerland	Hard (i)	1R	6–2, 7–5
16.	(Russia) Svetlana Kuznetsova	4	Zurich Open, Switzerland	Hard (i)	SF	6–4, 6–2
2007
17.	(Switzerland) Martina Hingis	6	Qatar Open, Qatar	Hard	QF	1–6, 6–4, 6–4
18.	(Switzerland) Martina Hingis	6	Indian Wells Open, United States	Hard	4R	6–4, 6–3
19.	(Russia) Svetlana Kuznetsova	4	Indian Wells Open, United States	Hard	F	6–3, 6–4
20.	(Russia) Anna Chakvetadze	10	Italian Open, Italy	Clay	3R	6–3, 6–3
21.	(Serbia) Ana Ivanovic	6	Rosmalen Championships, Netherlands	Grass	QF	6–3, 6–1
22.	(Russia) Svetlana Kuznetsova	2	WTA Tour Championships, Madrid, Spain	Hard (i)	RR	7–6^{(9–7)}, 6–0
2009
23.	(Russia) Vera Zvonareva	7	Cincinnati Open, United States	Hard	3R	7–6^{(8–6)}, 0–6, 7–6^{(7–5)}
2010
24.	(Russia) Elena Dementieva	7	Dubai Championships, UAE	Hard	2R	6–4, 1–1, retired
25.	(Serbia) Jelena Janković	7	Charleston Open, United States	Clay (green)	QF	1–6, 6–3, 6–3
26.	(Serbia) Jelena Janković	7	Fed Cup, Belgrade, Serbia	Clay (i)	RR	7–6, 7–5
2011
27.	(Russia) Vera Zvonareva	3	Thailand Open, Thailand	Hard	SF	7–6^{(7–3)}, 6–4
28.	(Belarus) Victoria Azarenka	9	Qatar Open, Qatar	Hard	1R	4–6, 6–1, 6–2
29.	(Denmark) Caroline Wozniacki	1	French Open, France	Clay	3R	6–1, 6–3
30.	(China) Li Na	4	Eastbourne International, UK	Grass	2R	7–6^{(9–7)}, 6–3
31.	(France) Marion Bartoli	9	Cincinnati Open, United States	Hard	3R	6–3, 5–7, 6–3
2013
32.	(Italy) Sara Errani	6	Brisbane International, Australia	Hard	2R	4–6, 6–1, 7–5
33.	(Czech Republic) Petra Kvitová	8	Madrid Open, Spain	Clay	2R	2–6, 6–2, 6–3
