= 2007 Toray Pan Pacific Open =

- Date: January 27 – February 4
- Edition: 24th
- Category: Tier I
- Draw: 28S / 16D
- Prize money: $1,340,000
- Surface: Carpet / indoor
- Location: Tokyo, Japan
- Venue: Tokyo Metropolitan Gymnasium

Champions

Singles
- (Switzerland) Martina Hingis

Doubles
- (United States) Lisa Raymond / (Australia) Samantha Stosur
← 2006 ·	Pan Pacific Open	· 2008 →

The 2007 Toray Pan Pacific Open was a women's tennis tournament played on indoor carpet courts. It was the 24th edition of the Toray Pan Pacific Open, and was part of the Tier I Series of the 2007 WTA Tour. It took place at the Tokyo Metropolitan Gymnasium in Tokyo, Japan, from January 27 through February 4, 2007. Second-seeded Martina Hingis won the singles title.

== Finals ==
=== Singles ===
(Switzerland) Martina Hingis defeated (Serbia) Ana Ivanovic, 6–4, 6–2

- It was Hingis's 43rd title of her career, and her fifth title in Tokyo, also winning in 1997, 1999, 2000 and 2002. This gave her the most singles titles at this event, having previously been tied with Davenport. It was also the final tournament she won before her second and final retirement from singles tennis.

=== Doubles ===
(United States) Lisa Raymond / (Australia) Samantha Stosur defeated (United States) Vania King / (Australia) Rennae Stubbs, 7–6^{(8–6)}, 3–6, 7–5

- It was Raymond's 61st title overall, and Stosur's 18th. As a team, it was their 20th title. It was Raymond's fourth title in Tokyo, having won it last year (also with Stosur), and in 2001 and 2002 with Rennae Stubbs.
