= 2002 Eurocard German Open =

2002 WTA German Open
- Date: 6–12 May
- Edition: 91st
- Category: Tier I
- Draw: 56S / 28D
- Prize money: $1,224,000
- Surface: Clay / outdoor
- Location: Berlin, Germany
- Venue: Rot-Weiss Tennis Club

Champions

Singles
- (Belgium) Justine Henin

Doubles
- (Russia) Elena Dementieva (Slovakia) Janette Husárová
- WTA German Open

The 2002 Eurocard German Open was a women's tennis event that was played from 6 May to 12 May 2002. It was one of two Tier I events that took place on red clay in the build-up to the second Grand Slam of the year, the French Open. It was the 91st edition of the tournament and was played at the Rot-Weiss Tennis Club in the German capital of Berlin. The tournaments offered a total prize fund of US$1,224,000 across all rounds. Fifth-seeded Justine Henin won the singles title and earned $182,000 first-prize money.

== Finals ==
=== Singles ===
(Belgium) Justine Henin defeated (United States) Serena Williams, 6–2, 1–6, 7–6^{(7–5)}

- It was Henin's 1st singles title of the year and the 5th of her career.

=== Doubles ===
(Russia) Elena Dementieva / (Slovakia) Janette Husárová defeated (Slovakia) Daniela Hantuchová / (Spain) Arantxa Sánchez, 0–6, 7–6^{(7–3)}, 6–2

== Prize money ==
Event	W	F	SF	QF	Round of 16	Round of 32	Round of 64
Singles	$182,000	$92,500	$47,000	$24,600	$12,000	$6,200	$3,125
