= 2006 Toray Pan Pacific Open =

- Date: January 27 – February 5
- Edition: 23rd
- Category: Tier I
- Draw: 28S / 16D
- Prize money: $1,340,000
- Surface: Carpet / indoor
- Location: Tokyo, Japan
- Venue: Tokyo Metropolitan Gymnasium

Champions

Singles
- (Russia) Elena Dementieva

Doubles
- (United States) Lisa Raymond / (Australia) Samantha Stosur
| ← 2005 · | Pan Pacific Open | · 2007 → |

The 2006 Toray Pan Pacific Open was a women's tennis tournament played on indoor carpet courts. It was the 23rd edition of the Toray Pan Pacific Open, and was part of the Tier I Series of the 2006 WTA Tour. It took place at the Tokyo Metropolitan Gymnasium in Tokyo, Japan, from January 27 through February 5, 2006. Second-seeded Elena Dementieva won the singles title.

== Finals ==
=== Singles ===
(Russia) Elena Dementieva defeated (Switzerland) Martina Hingis, 6–2, 6–0

=== Doubles ===
(United States) Lisa Raymond / (Australia) Samantha Stosur defeated (Zimbabwe) Cara Black / (Australia) Rennae Stubbs, 6–2, 6–1
