= 2003 MasterCard German Open – Singles =

Singles
- 2003 MasterCard German Open

Final
- Champion: (Belgium) Justine Henin-Hardenne
- Runner-up: (Belgium) Kim Clijsters
- Score: 6–4, 4–6, 7–5

Details
- Draw: 56
- Seeds: 16

Events
| Singles | Doubles |
| ← 2002 · | WTA German Open | · 2004 → |

Defending champion Justine Henin-Hardenne defeated Kim Clijsters in the final, 6–4, 4–6, 7–5 to win the singles tennis title at the 2003 WTA German Open. It was her third title of the year, and the ninth of her career.

== Seeds ==
The first nine seeds received a bye into the second round.

1. (Belgium) Kim Clijsters (final)
2. (United States) ~~Venus Williams~~ (withdrew due to a left abdominal strain)
3. (Belgium) Justine Henin-Hardenne (champion)
4. (United States) Jennifer Capriati (semifinals)
5. (France) Amélie Mauresmo (semifinals)
6. (United States) Chanda Rubin (second round)
7. (Slovakia) Daniela Hantuchová (quarterfinals)
8. (Federal Republic of Yugoslavia) Jelena Dokic (third round)
9. (Russia) Anastasia Myskina (second round)
10. (Russia) Elena Dementieva (first round, retired due to a left foot strain)
11. (Bulgaria) Magdalena Maleeva (first round)
12. (Greece) Eleni Daniilidou (third round)
13. (Japan) Ai Sugiyama (first round)
14. (United States) Meghann Shaughnessy (second round)
15. (Switzerland) Patty Schnyder (third round)
16. (Israel) Anna Pistolesi (third round)
17. (France) Nathalie Dechy (third round)

== Draw ==
=== Key ===
- Q = Qualifier
- WC = Wild card
- LL = Lucky loser
- Alt = Alternate
- SE = Special exempt
- PR = Protected ranking
- ITF = ITF entry
- JE = Junior exempt
- w/o = Walkover
- r = Retired
- d = Defaulted
- SR = Special ranking

=== Finals ===
Quarterfinals
1 | (Belgium) Kim Clijsters | 6 | 6
7 | (Slovakia) Daniela Hantuchová | 0 | 3
4 | (United States) Jennifer Capriati | 6 | 6
(Russia) Elena Likhovtseva | 3 | 3
(Uzbekistan) Iroda Tulyaganova | 6^{5} | 4
5 | (France) Amélie Mauresmo | 7^{7} | 6
(Russia) Vera Zvonareva | 4 | 5
3 | (Belgium) Justine Henin-Hardenne | 6 | 7

Semifinals
1 | (Belgium) Kim Clijsters | 6 | 6^{2} | 6
4 | (United States) Jennifer Capriati | 4 | 7^{7} | 4
5 | (France) Amélie Mauresmo | 6^{6} | 4
3 | (Belgium) Justine Henin-Hardenne | 7^{8} | 6

Final
1 | (Belgium) Kim Clijsters | 4 | 6 | 5
3 | (Belgium) Justine Henin-Hardenne | 6 | 4 | 7

=== Top half ===
==== Section 1 ====
First round
(France) É Loit | 4 | 6 | 6
(Slovenia) K Srebotnik | 6 | 3 | 3
(Argentina) P Suárez | 3 | 1
Q | (Colombia) F Zuluaga | 6 | 6
(Croatia) I Majoli | 6^{3} | 6 | 4
14 | (United States) M Shaughnessy | 7^{7} | 3 | 6
13 | (Japan) A Sugiyama | 1 | 5
(Switzerland) M-G Mikaelian | 6 | 7
(Spain) V Ruano Pascual | 7^{9}
(France) M Pierce | 6^{7} | r
(United States) L Granville | 6 | 5 | 3
(Austria) B Schett | 3 | 7 | 6

Second round
1 | (Belgium) K Clijsters | 6 | 6
(France) É Loit | 4 | 2
Q | (Colombia) F Zuluaga | 3 | 6 | 6
14 | (United States) M Shaughnessy | 6 | 4 | 1
(Switzerland) M-G Mikaelian | 6^{6} | 6 | 6
(Spain) V Ruano Pascual | 7^{8} | 2 | 1
(Austria) B Schett | 3 | 6 | 3
7 | (Slovakia) D Hantuchová | 6 | 4 | 6

Third round
1 | (Belgium) K Clijsters | 7 | 6
Q | (Colombia) F Zuluaga | 5 | 3
(Switzerland) M-G Mikaelian | 6 | 4 | 6^{2}
7 | (Slovakia) D Hantuchová | 4 | 6 | 7^{7}

Quarterfinals
1 | (Belgium) K Clijsters | 6 | 6
7 | (Slovakia) D Hantuchová | 0 | 3

==== Section 2 ====
First round
(Italy) F Schiavone | 3 | 7 | 6
Q | (Netherlands) K Boogert | 6 | 5 | 3
(Italy) T Garbin | 4 | 4
(Slovenia) M Matevžič | 6 | 6
(Argentina) C Fernández | 0 | 4
17 | (France) N Dechy | 6 | 6
11 | (Bulgaria) M Maleeva | 7^{7} | 1 | 4
(Czech Republic) D Chládková | 6^{1} | 6 | 6
(Russia) E Likhovtseva | 6 | 6
Q | (Slovakia) H Nagyová | 1 | 1
(Spain) M Serna | 6 | 6
(Italy) S Farina Elia | 3 | 4

Second round
4 | (United States) J Capriati | 6 | 6
(Italy) F Schiavone | 4 | 4
(Slovenia) M Matevžič | 4 | 2
17 | (France) N Dechy | 6 | 6
(Czech Republic) D Chládková | 7 | 4 | 4
(Russia) E Likhovtseva | 5 | 6 | 6
(Spain) M Serna | 7 | 6
6 | (United States) C Rubin | 5 | 3

Third round
4 | (United States) J Capriati | 6 | 6
17 | (France) N Dechy | 2 | 3
(Russia) E Likhovtseva | 5 | 6 | 6
(Spain) M Serna | 7 | 4 | 4

Quarterfinals
4 | (United States) J Capriati | 6 | 6
(Russia) E Likhovtseva | 3 | 3

=== Bottom half ===
==== Section 3 ====
First round
(Spain) C Martínez | 2 | 5
WC | (Germany) M Weingärtner | 6 | 7
(Uzbekistan) I Tulyaganova | 6 | 6
Q | (Germany) B Rittner | 1 | 1
Q | (Russia) D Safina | 2 | 6 | 1
10 | (Russia) E Dementieva | 6 | 2 | 0^{r}
16 | (Israel) A Pistolesi | 6 | 6
(Russia) T Panova | 1 | 1
(Germany) A Barna | 6 | 6
(Spain) A Medina Garrigues | 4 | 2
WC | (Germany) M Müller | 4 | 4
Q | (Croatia) J Kostanić | 6 | 6

Second round
8 | (Federal Republic of Yugoslavia) J Dokic | 7^{7} | 6
WC | (Germany) M Weingärtner | 6^{5} | 4
(Uzbekistan) I Tulyaganova | 6 | 3 | 6
Q | (Russia) D Safina | 3 | 6 | 4
16 | (Israel) A Pistolesi | 6 | 6
(Germany) A Barna | 3 | 2
Q | (Croatia) J Kostanić | 1 | 4
5 | (France) A Mauresmo | 6 | 6

Third round
8 | (Federal Republic of Yugoslavia) J Dokic | 6 | 2 | 6^{0}
(Uzbekistan) I Tulyaganova | 4 | 6 | 7^{7}
16 | (Israel) A Pistolesi | 3 | 2
5 | (France) A Mauresmo | 6 | 6

Quarterfinals
(Uzbekistan) I Tulyaganova | 6^{5} | 4
5 | (France) A Mauresmo | 7^{7} | 6

==== Section 4 ====
First round
(Russia) V Zvonareva | 3 | 6 | 6
(Switzerland) M Casanova | 6 | 2 | 2
PR | (Russia) N Petrova | 6 | 6
Q | (Paraguay) R Neffa-de los Ríos | 3 | 2
WC | (Germany) A Bachmann | 2 | 2
12 | (Greece) E Daniilidou | 6 | 6
15 | (Switzerland) P Schnyder | 2 | 6 | 6
LL | (Belgium) E Callens | 6 | 4 | 3
(Russia) S Kuznetsova | 6 | 6
(France) V Razzano | 1 | 1
Q | (Germany) A-L Grönefeld | 2 | 3
(Czech Republic) D Bedáňová | 6 | 6

Second round
9 | (Russia) A Myskina | 1 | 2
(Russia) V Zvonareva | 6 | 6
PR | (Russia) N Petrova | 6 | 2 | 2
12 | (Greece) E Daniilidou | 1 | 6 | 6
15 | (Switzerland) P Schnyder | 7^{7} | 6
(Russia) S Kuznetsova | 6^{4} | 4
(Czech Republic) D Bedáňová | 4 | 1
3 | (Belgium) J Henin-Hardenne | 6 | 6

Third round
(Russia) V Zvonareva | 7 | 4 | 6
12 | (Greece) E Daniilidou | 5 | 6 | 4
15 | (Switzerland) P Schnyder | 2 | 3
3 | (Belgium) J Henin-Hardenne | 6 | 6

Quarterfinals
(Russia) V Zvonareva | 4 | 5
3 | (Belgium) J Henin-Hardenne | 6 | 7
