= 2002 Eurocard German Open – Singles =

Singles
- 2002 Eurocard German Open

Final
- Champion: (Belgium) Justine Henin
- Runner-up: (United States) Serena Williams
- Score: 6–2, 1–6, 7–6^{(7–5)}

Details
- Draw: 56
- Seeds: 16

Events
Singles	Doubles
← 2001 ·	WTA German Open	· 2003 →

Justine Henin defeated Serena Williams in the final, 6–2, 1–6, 7–6^{(7–5)} to win the singles tennis title at the 2002 WTA German Open.

Amélie Mauresmo was the defending champion, but withdrew prior to her quarterfinal match against Williams.

== Seeds ==
The top eight seeds receive a bye into the second round.

1. (United States) Jennifer Capriati (semifinals)
2. (Belgium) Kim Clijsters (second round)
3. (Switzerland) ~~Martina Hingis~~ (withdrew)
4. (United States) Serena Williams (final)
5. (Belgium) Justine Henin (champion)
6. (Federal Republic of Yugoslavia) Jelena Dokic (third round)
7. (France) Amélie Mauresmo (quarterfinals, withdrew due to a neck sprain)
8. (France) Sandrine Testud (quarterfinals)
9. (United States) Meghann Shaughnessy (second round)
10. (Italy) Silvia Farina Elia (third round)
11. (Slovakia) Daniela Hantuchová (quarterfinals)
12. (Russia) Elena Dementieva (first round)
13. (Spain) Arantxa Sánchez Vicario (third round)
14. (Uzbekistan) Iroda Tulyaganova (third round)
15. (South Africa) Amanda Coetzer (first round, retired due to a thigh strain)
16. (Thailand) Tamarine Tanasugarn (second round)
17. (Russia) Tatiana Panova (first round)

== Draw ==
=== Key ===
- Q = Qualifier
- WC = Wild card
- LL = Lucky loser
- Alt = Alternate
- SE = Special exempt
- PR = Protected ranking
- ITF = ITF entry
- JE = Junior exempt
- w/o = Walkover
- r = Retired
- d = Defaulted
- SR = Special ranking

=== Finals ===
Quarterfinals
1	(United States) Jennifer Capriati	6	5	6
8	(France) Sandrine Testud	3	7	4
5	(Belgium) Justine Henin	6	6
(France) Nathalie Dechy	0	4
7	(France) Amélie Mauresmo
4	(United States) Serena Williams	w/o
11	(Slovakia) Daniela Hantuchová	6	2	3
(Israel) Anna Smashnova	1	6	6

Semifinals
1	(United States) Jennifer Capriati	7	2	1
5	(Belgium) Justine Henin	5	6	6
4	(United States) Serena Williams	6	6
(Israel) Anna Smashnova	3	2

Final
5	(Belgium) Justine Henin	6	1	7^{7}
4	(United States) Serena Williams	2	6	6^{5}

=== Top half ===
==== Section 1 ====
First round
(United States) M Tu	6	6
(Italy) A Serra Zanetti	3	2
Q	(Denmark) E Dyrberg	6	6
Q	(Czech Republic) D Chládková	4	2
(Spain) G León García	4	0
14	(Uzbekistan) I Tulyaganova	6	6
12	(Russia) E Dementieva	4	6	5
Q	(Germany) A Roesch	6	1	7
LL	(Switzerland) MG Mikaelian	6	2
(Germany) M Weingärtner	3	0^{r}
(Russia) A Myskina	6	7
(Slovakia) M Suchá	2	5

Second round
1	(United States) J Capriati	6	6
(United States) M Tu	4	3
Q	(Denmark) E Dyrberg	5	3
14	(Uzbekistan) I Tulyaganova	7	6
Q	(Germany) A Roesch	0	1
LL	(Switzerland) MG Mikaelian	6	6
(Russia) A Myskina	4	5
8	(France) S Testud	6	7

Third round
1	(United States) J Capriati	6	6
14	(Uzbekistan) I Tulyaganova	2	0
LL	(Switzerland) MG Mikaelian	2	2
8	(France) S Testud	6	6

Quarterfinals
1	(United States) J Capriati	6	5	6
8	(France) S Testud	3	7	4

==== Section 2 ====
First round
(Paraguay) R de los Ríos	5	1
WC	(Germany) M Müller	7	6
Q	(Canada) M Drake	6	6^{5}	6
Q	(Spain) M Sánchez Lorenzo	3	7^{7}	3
(Russia) E Likhovtseva	7	3	7^{7}
17	(Russia) T Panova	5	6	6^{3}
13	(Spain) A Sánchez Vicario	6	6
(Slovenia) T Pisnik	4	1
(Spain) C Martínez	7	6
(Greece) E Daniilidou	5	1
(France) N Dechy	6	6
(Slovakia) J Husárová	3	2

Second round
5	(Belgium) J Henin	2	6	6
WC	(Germany) M Müller	6	2	3
Q	(Canada) M Drake	6	4	5
(Russia) E Likhovtseva	3	6	7
13	(Spain) A Sánchez Vicario	6	6
(Spain) C Martínez	1	3
(France) N Dechy	6	2	6
9	(United States) M Shaughnessy	3	6	3

Third round
5	(Belgium) J Henin	5	6	6
(Russia) E Likhovtseva	7	4	4
13	(Spain) A Sánchez Vicario	6^{4}	3
(France) N Dechy	7^{7}	6

Quarterfinals
5	(Belgium) J Henin	6	6
(France) N Dechy	0	4

=== Bottom half ===
==== Section 3 ====
First round
Q	(Zimbabwe) C Black	6	6
(United States) L Osterloh	0	3
WC	(Germany) A Barna	4	6	7^{12}
(Italy) R Grande	6	2	6^{10}
(Slovenia) K Srebotnik	6	4	4
10	(Italy) S Farina Elia	3	6	6
16	(Thailand) T Tanasugarn	6	4	6
LL	(United States) J Hopkins	0	6	4
Q	(Spain) M Marrero	1	6	6^{5}
(Bulgaria) M Maleeva	6	1	7^{7}
(Austria) B Schett	6	6
(Italy) F Schiavone	2	2

Second round
7	(France) A Mauresmo	6	6
Q	(Zimbabwe) C Black	4	0
WC	(Germany) A Barna	3	5
10	(Italy) S Farina Elia	6	7
16	(Thailand) T Tanasugarn	4	0
(Bulgaria) M Maleeva	6	6
(Austria) B Schett	3	2
4	(United States) S Williams	6	6

Third round
7	(France) A Mauresmo	6	6
10	(Italy) S Farina Elia	3	3
(Bulgaria) M Maleeva	6^{2}	4
4	(United States) S Williams	7^{7}	6

Quarterfinals
7	(France) A Mauresmo
4	(United States) S Williams	w/o

==== Section 4 ====
First round
Q	(Argentina) M Díaz Oliva	1	5
PR	(France) M Pierce	6	7
LL	(United States) C Rubin	6	5	6
(Spain) M Serna	4	7	4
(Argentina) P Suárez	5	6	1
11	(Slovakia) D Hantuchová	7	3	6
15	(South Africa) A Coetzer	3	0^{r}
(Czech Republic) D Bedáňová	6	1
(Luxembourg) A Kremer	7^{7}	3	2
(Spain) C Torrens Valero	6^{5}	6	6
(Israel) A Smashnova	6	6
(Spain) Á Montolio	1	3

Second round
6	(Federal Republic of Yugoslavia) J Dokic	1	6	6
PR	(France) M Pierce	6	3	1
LL	(United States) C Rubin	2	4
11	(Slovakia) D Hantuchová	6	6
(Czech Republic) D Bedáňová	6^{4}	6	5
(Spain) C Torrens Valero	7^{7}	4	7
(Israel) A Smashnova	5	6	7
2	(Belgium) K Clijsters	7	4	5

Third round
6	(Federal Republic of Yugoslavia) J Dokic	2	3
11	(Slovakia) D Hantuchová	6	6
(Spain) C Torrens Valero	6^{0}	0
(Israel) A Smashnova	7^{7}	6

Quarterfinals
11	(Slovakia) D Hantuchová	6	2	3
(Israel) A Smashnova	1	6	6
