= 1999 du Maurier Open – Women's singles qualifying =

Tennis tournament

Women's singles qualifying
- 1999 du Maurier Open

Events
Singles	men	women
Doubles	men	women
← 1998 ·	du Maurier Open	· 2000 →

The 1999 Canadian Open was a WTA tennis tournament, played on outdoor hard courts.

== Players ==
=== Seeds ===
1. (Colombia) Fabiola Zuluaga (Qualifier)
2. n.a.
3. (Germany) Barbara Rittner (qualifying competition, retired)
4. (Canada) Maureen Drake (Qualifier)
5. (Austria) Barbara Schwartz (first round)
6. (Slovenia) Katarina Srebotnik (first round)
7. (Germany) Marlene Weingärtner (Qualifier)
8. (Spain) Virginia Ruano Pascual (first round)
9. (Russia) Tatiana Panova (Qualifier)

=== Qualifiers ===
1. (Colombia) Fabiola Zuluaga
2. (Australia) Nicole Pratt
3. (Canada) Maureen Drake
4. (Ukraine) Elena Tatarkova
5. (France) Émilie Loit
6. (Venezuela) María Vento
7. (Germany) Marlene Weingärtner
8. (Russia) Tatiana Panova

==== Lucky losers ====
1. (France) Amélie Cocheteux
2. (Spain) Ángeles Montolio

== Qualifying draw ==
=== Key ===
- Q = Qualifier
- WC = Wild card
- LL = Lucky loser
- Alt = Alternate
- SE = Special exempt
- PR = Protected ranking
- ITF = ITF entry
- JE = Junior exempt
- w/o = Walkover
- r = Retired
- d = Defaulted
- SR = Special ranking

=== First qualifier ===
First round
1	(Colombia) Fabiola Zuluaga	7^{7}	6
WC	(Canada) Susan Huang	6^{2}	3
WC	(Canada) Aneta Soukup	4	0
(Russia) Elena Dementieva	6	6

Qualifying competition
1	(Colombia) Fabiola Zuluaga	7^{7}	6
(Russia) Elena Dementieva	6^{3}	3

=== Second qualifier ===
First round
(United States) Lilia Osterloh	6^{3}	6	6
(Australia) Catherine Barclay	7^{7}	4	1
(Australia) Nicole Pratt	6	4	6
6	(Slovenia) Katarina Srebotnik	3	6	0

Qualifying competition
(United States) Lilia Osterloh	2	3
(Australia) Nicole Pratt	6	6

=== Third qualifier ===
First round
4	(Canada) Maureen Drake	6	6
(Slovenia) Tina Križan	3	1
(Australia) Kerry-Anne Guse	6	2	6^{3}
(Netherlands) Miriam Oremans	2	6	7^{7}

Qualifying competition
4	(Canada) Maureen Drake	6	6
(Netherlands) Miriam Oremans	1	3

=== Fourth qualifier ===
First round
(France) Amélie Cocheteux	6	6
(France) Alexandra Fusai	1	2
(Ukraine) Elena Tatarkova	2	6	6
8	(Spain) Virginia Ruano Pascual	6	3	3

Qualifying competition
(France) Amélie Cocheteux	6	1	2
(Ukraine) Elena Tatarkova	3	6	6

=== Fifth qualifier ===
First round
5	(Austria) Barbara Schwartz	4	3
(Canada) Vanessa Webb	6	6
WC	(Canada) Sanja Bajin	1	1
(France) Émilie Loit	6	6

Qualifying competition
(Canada) Vanessa Webb	4	6	2
(France) Émilie Loit	6	4	6

=== Sixth qualifier ===
First round
(Germany) Elena Wagner	6^{0}	6	2
(Venezuela) María Vento	7^{7}	4	6
(South Africa) Esmé de Villiers	2	4
3	(Germany) Barbara Rittner	6	6

Qualifying competition
(Venezuela) María Vento	6	2
3	(Germany) Barbara Rittner	4	0^{r}

=== Seventh qualifier ===
First round
7	(Germany) Marlene Weingärtner	6	6
WC	(Canada) Marie-Ève Pelletier	1	0
(United States) Jane Chi	6^{5}	2
(United States) Nicole Arendt	7^{7}	6

Qualifying competition
7	(Germany) Marlene Weingärtner	6	6
(United States) Nicole Arendt	4	4

=== Eighth qualifier ===
First round
(Spain) Ángeles Montolio	6	6
(Romania) Cătălina Cristea	3	2
(France) Alexia Dechaume-Balleret	5	1
9	(Russia) Tatiana Panova	7	6

Qualifying competition
(Spain) Ángeles Montolio	5	4
9	(Russia) Tatiana Panova	7	6
