= 2003 MasterCard German Open =

- Date: 5–11 May
- Edition: 92nd
- Category: Tier I
- Draw: 56S / 28D
- Prize money: $1,224,000
- Surface: Clay / outdoor
- Location: Berlin, Germany
- Venue: Rot-Weiss Tennis Club

Champions

Singles
- (Belgium) Justine Henin-Hardenne

Doubles
- (Spain) Virginia Ruano / (Argentina) Paola Suárez
- WTA German Open

The 2003 MasterCard German Open was a women's tennis event that was played in Berlin, Germany from 5 May until 11 May 2003. It was one of two Tier I events that took place on red clay in the build-up to the second Grand Slam of the year, the French Open. It was the 92nd edition of the tournament. Third-seeded Justine Henin-Hardenne won her second consecutive singles title at the event and earned $182,000 first-prize money.

== Finals ==
=== Singles ===
(Belgium) Justine Henin-Hardenne defeated (Belgium) Kim Clijsters, 6–4, 4–6, 7–5

- It was Henin's 3rd singles title of the year and the 9th of her career.

=== Doubles ===
(Spain) Virginia Ruano Pascual / (Argentina) Paola Suárez defeated (Belgium) Kim Clijsters / (Japan) Ai Sugiyama, 6–3, 4–6, 6–4

== Prize money ==
Event	W	F	SF	QF	Round of 16	Round of 32	Round of 64
Singles	$182,000	$92,500	$47,000	$24,600	$12,000	$6,200	$3,125
