= 2006 Toray Pan Pacific Open – Singles =

Singles
- 2006 Toray Pan Pacific Open

Final
- Champion: (Russia) Elena Dementieva
- Runner-up: (Switzerland) Martina Hingis
- Score: 6–2, 6–0

Details
- Draw: 28 (3 Q / 3 WC )
- Seeds: 8

Events
Singles	Doubles
← 2005 ·	Pan Pacific Open	· 2007 →

Elena Dementieva defeated Martina Hingis in the final, 6–2, 6–0 to win the singles tennis title at the 2006 Pan Pacific Open.

Maria Sharapova was the defending champion, but lost to Hingis in the semifinals.

== Seeds ==
1. (Russia) Maria Sharapova (semifinals)
2. (Russia) Elena Dementieva (champion)
3. (France) Nathalie Dechy (second round)
4. (Russia) Anastasia Myskina (semifinals)
5. (Czech Republic) Nicole Vaidišová (quarterfinals)
6. (Slovakia) Daniela Hantuchová (second round)
7. (Russia) Elena Likhovtseva (quarterfinals)
8. (Serbia and Montenegro) Ana Ivanovic (second round)

== Draw ==
=== Key ===
- Q = Qualifier
- WC = Wild card
- LL = Lucky loser
- Alt = Alternate
- ITF = ITF entry
- PR = Protected ranking
- SR = Special ranking
- SE = Special exempt
- JE = Junior exempt
- JR = Junior Accelerator Programme entrant
- CO = College Accelerator Programme entrant
- NG = Next Gen Accelerator Program entrant
- w/o = Walkover
- r = Retired
- d = Defaulted

=== Finals ===
Quarterfinals
1	(Russia) Maria Sharapova	6	6
(Australia) Samantha Stosur	1	4
WC	(Switzerland) Martina Hingis	6	6
(Russia) Maria Kirilenko	2	1
7	(Russia) Elena Likhovtseva	6	2	3
4	(Russia) Anastasia Myskina	4	6	6
5	(Czech Republic) Nicole Vaidišová	6	1	2
2	(Russia) Elena Dementieva	3	6	6

Semifinals
1	(Russia) Maria Sharapova	3	1
WC	(Switzerland) Martina Hingis	6	6
4	(Russia) Anastasia Myskina	4	6	4
2	(Russia) Elena Dementieva	6	3	6

Final
WC	(Switzerland) Martina Hingis	2	0
2	(Russia) Elena Dementieva	6	6

=== Top half ===
First round
Q	(United States) L Raymond	6	6
Q	(United States) M Tu	1	3
(Australia) S Stosur	6	6
WC	(Japan) A Nakamura	1	3
(Serbia and Montenegro) J Janković	6	4	4
6	(Slovakia) D Hantuchová	2	6	6
LL	(South Korea) Y-j Cho	0	0
WC	(Switzerland) M Hingis	6	6
(Russia) M Kirilenko	6	6
WC	(Italy) M Santangelo	4	1
(Japan) A Sugiyama	3	0
8	(Serbia and Montenegro) A Ivanovic	6	6

Second round
1	(Russia) M Sharapova	6	6
Q	(United States) L Raymond	4	0
(Australia) S Stosur	7	6
6	(Slovakia) D Hantuchová	6^{5}	2
3	(France) N Dechy	6	5	2
WC	(Switzerland) M Hingis	4	7	6
(Russia) M Kirilenko	6	6
8	(Serbia and Montenegro) A Ivanovic	4	4

Quarterfinals
1	(Russia) M Sharapova	6	6
(Australia) S Stosur	1	4
WC	(Switzerland) M Hingis	6	6
(Russia) M Kirilenko	2	1

Semifinals
1	(Russia) M Sharapova	3	1
WC	(Switzerland) M Hingis	6	6

=== Bottom half ===
First round
7	(Russia) E Likhovtseva	6	6
(Japan) S Asagoe	3	2
(France) M Bartoli	6	6
(France) T Golovin	3	0
(Czech Republic) K Koukalová	7	7
(China) J Zheng	5	6^{2}
5	(Czech Republic) N Vaidišová	6	6
LL	(Japan) R Fujiwara	3	1
Q	(Japan) S Obata	6	6
(Czech Republic) K Peschke	2	1
(United States) J Craybas	6^{8}	3
(Slovenia) K Srebotnik	7	6

Second round
7	(Russia) E Likhovtseva	6	7
(France) M Bartoli	2	5
(Czech Republic) K Koukalová	4	4
4	(Russia) A Myskina	6	6
5	(Czech Republic) N Vaidišová	6	6
Q	(Japan) S Obata	4	4
(Slovenia) K Srebotnik	6	1	5
2	(Russia) E Dementieva	2	6	7

Quarterfinals
7	(Russia) E Likhovtseva	6	2	3
4	(Russia) A Myskina	4	6	6
5	(Czech Republic) N Vaidišová	6	1	2
2	(Russia) E Dementieva	3	6	6

Semifinals
4	(Russia) A Myskina	4	6	4
2	(Russia) E Dementieva	6	3	6
