= 2002 Eurocard German Open – Doubles =

Doubles
- 2002 Eurocard German Open

Final
- Champions: (Russia) Elena Dementieva (Slovakia) Janette Husárová
- Runners-up: (Slovakia) Daniela Hantuchová (Spain) Arantxa Sánchez Vicario
- Score: 0–6, 7–6^{(7–3)}, 6–2

Details
- Draw: 28
- Seeds: 8

Events
Singles	Doubles
← 2001 ·	WTA German Open	· 2003 →

Els Callens and Meghann Shaughnessy were the defending champions, but chose to play on separate teams for this year. Callens played alongside Chanda Rubin and were eliminated in the quarterfinals, while Shaughnessy teamed up with Magdalena Maleeva and lost in the second round.

Elena Dementieva and Janette Husárová won the title by defeating Daniela Hantuchová and Arantxa Sánchez Vicario 0–6, 7–6^{(7–3)}, 6–2 in the final. It was the 1st title for Dementieva and the 11th title for Husárová in their respective doubles careers.

== Seeds ==
The first four seeds received a bye into the second round.

1. (Zimbabwe) Cara Black / (Russia) Elena Likhovtseva (semifinals)
2. (Slovakia) Daniela Hantuchová / (Spain) Arantxa Sánchez Vicario (final)
3. (South Africa) Liezel Huber / (Spain) Conchita Martínez (second round)
4. (Argentina) Paola Suárez / (Argentina) Patricia Tarabini (semifinals)
5. (Slovenia) Tina Križan / (Slovenia) Katarina Srebotnik (first round)
6. (Russia) Elena Dementieva / (Slovakia) Janette Husárová (champions)
7. (South Africa) Amanda Coetzer / (United States) Lori McNeil (first round, withdrew due to a thigh strain for Coetzer)
8. (Belgium) Els Callens / (United States) Chanda Rubin (quarterfinals)

== Draw ==
=== Key ===
- Q = Qualifier
- WC = Wild card
- LL = Lucky loser
- Alt = Alternate
- SE = Special exempt
- PR = Protected ranking
- ITF = ITF entry
- JE = Junior exempt
- w/o = Walkover
- r = Retired
- d = Defaulted
- SR = Special ranking

=== Finals ===
Semifinal
1	(Zimbabwe) Cara Black (Russia) Elena Likhovtseva	2	2
6	(Russia) Elena Dementieva (Slovakia) Janette Husárová	6	6
4	(Argentina) Paola Suárez (Argentina) Patricia Tarabini	6^{5}	5
2	(Slovakia) Daniela Hantuchová (Spain) Arantxa Sánchez Vicario	7^{7}	7

Final
6	(Russia) Elena Dementieva (Slovakia) Janette Husárová	0	7^{7}	6
2	(Slovakia) Daniela Hantuchová (Spain) Arantxa Sánchez Vicario	6	6^{3}	2

=== Top half ===
First round
(Germany) An Barna (Germany) V Henke	6	6^{5}	6
(Croatia) M Palaveršić (Russia) A Rodionova	4	7^{7}	4
Q	(Germany) Ad Barna (Germany) A Roesch	6	6
LL	(Germany) G Arn (United States) L Osterloh	4	3
(Spain) M Marrero (Paraguay) R de los Ríos	7^{7}	5	1
8	(Belgium) E Callens (United States) C Rubin	6^{4}	7	6
(France) N Dechy (United States) M Tu	6	4	0
(United States) J Capriati (Austria) B Schett	4	6	6
(France) A Fusai (Netherlands) C Vis	6	6
LL	(United States) J Hopkins (Russia) A Myskina	2	4
(South Africa) S De Beer (South Africa) N de Villiers	3	3
6	(Russia) E Dementieva (Slovakia) J Husárová	6	6

Second round
1	(Zimbabwe) C Black (Russia) E Likhovtseva	6	6
(Germany) An Barna (Germany) V Henke	4	2
Q	(Germany) Ad Barna (Germany) A Roesch	1	6	4
8	(Belgium) E Callens (United States) C Rubin	6	3	6
3	(South Africa) L Huber (Spain) C Martínez	4	6	4
(United States) J Capriati (Austria) B Schett	6	3	6
(France) A Fusai (Netherlands) C Vis	1	0
6	(Russia) E Dementieva (Slovakia) J Husárová	6	6

Quarterfinals
1	(Zimbabwe) C Black (Russia) E Likhovtseva	4	6	6
8	(Belgium) E Callens (United States) C Rubin	6	2	3
(United States) J Capriati (Austria) B Schett	3	7	3
6	(Russia) E Dementieva (Slovakia) J Husárová	6	5	6

Semifinals
1	(Zimbabwe) C Black (Russia) E Likhovtseva	2	2
6	(Russia) E Dementieva (Slovakia) J Husárová	6	6

=== Bottom half ===
First round
5	(Slovenia) T Križan (Slovenia) K Srebotnik	3	3
(Sweden) Å Svensson (Uzbekistan) I Tulyaganova	6	6
(Netherlands) K Boogert (Netherlands) M Oremans	6	6
(Denmark) E Dyrberg (Luxembourg) A Kremer	4	1
(Bulgaria) M Maleeva (United States) M Shaughnessy	6	6
(Australia) C Barclay (Thailand) T Tamasugarn	4	1
7	(South Africa) A Coetzer (United States) L McNeil
(United States) M Navratilova (Belarus) N Zvereva	w/o
(Czech Republic) D Bedáňová (Italy) F Schiavone	6^{7}	7^{7}	6
(Russia) T Panova (Spain) M Serna	7^{9}	6^{5}	2
WC	(Germany) A Glass (Germany) S Schmidle	7	6
(Italy) S Farina Elia (Italy) R Grande	5	2

Second round
(Sweden) Å Svensson (Uzbekistan) I Tulyaganova	6	6
(Netherlands) K Boogert (Netherlands) M Oremans	4	2
(Bulgaria) M Maleeva (United States) M Shaughnessy	6	5	5
4	(Argentina) P Suárez (Argentina) P Tarabini	4	7	7
(United States) M Navratilova (Belarus) N Zvereva	3	4
(Czech Republic) D Bedáňová (Italy) F Schiavone	6	6
WC	(Germany) A Glass (Germany) S Schmidle	3	5
2	(Slovakia) D Hantuchová (Spain) A Sánchez Vicario	6	7

Quarterfinals
(Sweden) Å Svensson (Uzbekistan) I Tulyaganova	3	3
4	(Argentina) P Suárez (Argentina) P Tarabini	6	6
(Czech Republic) D Bedáňová (Italy) F Schiavone	2	3
2	(Slovakia) D Hantuchová (Spain) A Sánchez Vicario	6	6

Semifinals
4	(Argentina) P Suárez (Argentina) P Tarabini	6^{5}	5
2	(Slovakia) D Hantuchová (Spain) A Sánchez Vicario	7^{7}	7
