= 2007 Toray Pan Pacific Open – Doubles =

Doubles
- 2007 Toray Pan Pacific Open

Final
- Champions: (United States) Lisa Raymond (Australia) Samantha Stosur
- Runners-up: (United States) Vania King (Australia) Rennae Stubbs
- Score: 7–6^{(8–6)}, 3–6, 7–5

Details
- Draw: 16
- Seeds: 4

Events
Singles	Doubles
← 2006 ·	Toray Pan Pacific Open	· 2008 →

Lisa Raymond and Samantha Stosur were the defending champions, and successfully defended their title, beating Vania King and Rennae Stubbs 7–6^{(8–6)}, 3–6, 7–5 in the final.

== Seeds ==
1. (United States) Lisa Raymond / (Australia) Samantha Stosur (champions)
2. (China) Yan Zi / (China) Zheng Jie (semifinals)
3. (Slovakia) Daniela Hantuchová / (Japan) Ai Sugiyama (first round)
4. (United States) Meghann Shaughnessy / (Russia) Vera Zvonareva (first round)

== Draw ==
=== Key ===
- Q = Qualifier
- WC = Wild card
- LL = Lucky loser
- Alt = Alternate
- ITF = ITF entry
- PR = Protected ranking
- SR = Special ranking
- SE = Special exempt
- JE = Junior exempt
- JR = Junior Accelerator Programme entrant
- CO = College Accelerator Programme entrant
- NG = Next Gen Accelerator Program entrant
- w/o = Walkover
- r = Retired
- d = Defaulted

=== Draw ===
First round
1	(United States) L Raymond (Australia) S Stosur	5	6	6
(Australia) N Pratt (Italy) M Santangelo	7	0	2
(Italy) F Schiavone (Italy) R Vinci	5	1
WC	(Russia) E Dementieva (Ukraine) O Savchuk	7	6
3	(Slovakia) D Hantuchová (Japan) A Sugiyama	6^{5}	3
(Serbia) J Janković (United States) B Mattek	7^{7}	6
(Finland) E Laine (Russia) A Rodionova	6	3	4
(Argentina) G Dulko (United States) M Tu	2	6	6
(United States) V King (Australia) R Stubbs	6	6
WC	(Japan) A Morigami (Japan) A Nakamura	1	2
(Russia) E Likhovtseva (Russia) E Vesnina	6	6
4	(United States) M Shaughnessy (Russia) V Zvonareva	3	1
(Russia) V Dushevina (Russia) M Kirilenko	6	6
(France) M Bartoli (Israel) S Pe'er	3	1
(China) N Li (China) T Sun	3	2
2	(China) Z Yan (China) J Zheng	6	6

Quarterfinals
1	(United States) L Raymond (Australia) S Stosur	7	6
WC	(Russia) E Dementieva (Ukraine) O Savchuk	5	2
(Serbia) J Janković (United States) B Mattek	6	3	3
(Argentina) G Dulko (United States) M Tu	2	6	6
(United States) V King (Australia) R Stubbs	6	2	6
(Russia) E Likhovtseva (Russia) E Vesnina	4	6	3
(Russia) V Dushevina (Russia) M Kirilenko	1	1
2	(China) Z Yan (China) J Zheng	6	6

Semifinals
1	(United States) L Raymond (Australia) S Stosur	6	6
(Argentina) G Dulko (United States) M Tu	2	4
(United States) V King (Australia) R Stubbs	7	4	7^{7}
2	(China) Z Yan (China) J Zheng	5	6	6^{3}

Finals
1	(United States) L Raymond (Australia) S Stosur	7^{8}	3	7
(United States) V King (Australia) R Stubbs	6^{6}	6	5

=== Notes ===
- The winners will receive $54,540 and 430 ranking points.
- The runners-up will receive $29,350 and 300 ranking points.
- The last direct acceptance team was Emma Laine/Anastassia Rodionova (combined ranking of 120th).
- The player representative was Akiko Morigami.
