= 2007 Toray Pan Pacific Open – Singles =

Singles
- 2007 Toray Pan Pacific Open

Final
- Champion: (Switzerland) Martina Hingis
- Runner-up: (Serbia) Ana Ivanovic
- Score: 6–4, 6–2

Details
- Draw: 28 (4 Q / 3 WC )
- Seeds: 8

Events
Singles	Doubles
← 2006 ·	Pan Pacific Open	· 2008 →

Martina Hingis defeated Ana Ivanovic in the final, 6–4, 6–2 to win the singles tennis title at the 2007 Pan Pacific Open. It was her last WTA Tour singles title.

Elena Dementieva was the defending champion, but lost in the semifinals to Hingis in a rematch of the previous year's final.

== Seeds ==
The top four seeds received a bye into the second round.

1. (Russia) Maria Sharapova (semifinals, retired due to hamstring injury)
2. (Switzerland) Martina Hingis (champion)
3. (Russia) Elena Dementieva (semifinals)
4. (Serbia) Jelena Janković (quarterfinals)
5. (Serbia) Ana Ivanovic (final)
6. (China) Li Na (second round)
7. (Israel) Shahar Pe'er (first round)
8. (Slovakia) Daniela Hantuchová (first round)

== Draw ==
=== Key ===
- Q = Qualifier
- WC = Wild card
- LL = Lucky loser
- Alt = Alternate
- ITF = ITF entry
- PR = Protected ranking
- SR = Special ranking
- SE = Special exempt
- JE = Junior exempt
- JR = Junior Accelerator Programme entrant
- CO = College Accelerator Programme entrant
- NG = Next Gen Accelerator Program entrant
- w/o = Walkover
- r = Retired
- d = Defaulted

=== Finals ===
Semifinals
1	(Russia) Maria Sharapova	1	1^{r}
5	(Serbia) Ana Ivanovic	6	0
3	(Russia) Elena Dementieva	4	3
2	(Switzerland) Martina Hingis	6	6

Final
5	(Serbia) Ana Ivanovic	4	2
2	(Switzerland) Martina Hingis	6	6

=== Top half ===
First round
(Italy) F Schiavone	7	7
WC	(Japan) E Takao	5	5
(Japan) A Sugiyama	6	6
(Russia) E Vesnina	4	2
(Russia) M Kirilenko	6	6
7	(Israel) S Pe'er	2	3
(China) J Zheng	6	6
Q	(United States) B Mattek	2	1
WC	(Japan) A Nakamura	5	0
(Italy) M Santangelo	7	6
(United States) S Perry	4	2
5	(Serbia) A Ivanovic	6	6

Second round
1	(Russia) M Sharapova	7	2	6
(Italy) F Schiavone	5	6	1
(Japan) A Sugiyama	3	6	6
(Russia) M Kirilenko	6	1	3
4	(Serbia) J Janković	6	6
(China) J Zheng	4	0
(Italy) M Santangelo	6	1	2
5	(Serbia) A Ivanovic	4	6	6

Quarterfinals
1	(Russia) M Sharapova	4	6	6
(Japan) A Sugiyama	6	0	1
4	(Serbia) J Janković	6	4	2
5	(Serbia) A Ivanovic	3	6	6

Semifinals
1	(Russia) M Sharapova	1	1	r
5	(Serbia) A Ivanovic	6	0

=== Bottom half ===
First round
8	(Slovakia) D Hantuchová	4	4
Q	(Italy) R Vinci	6	6
(France) S Brémond	6	6
(France) M Bartoli	0	2
(Russia) E Likhovtseva	6	6
WC	(Argentina) G Dulko	3	2
6	(China) N Li	6	6
Q	(United States) L Osterloh	3	2
(Australia) S Stosur	6	6^{4}	6
(Russia) V Zvonareva	4	7	4
Q	(Australia) N Pratt	6^{4}	6	6
(United States) M Shaughnessy	7	1	4

Second round
Q	(Italy) R Vinci	6	6
(France) S Brémond	3	0
(Russia) E Likhovtseva	3	5
3	(Russia) E Dementieva	6	6
6	(China) N Li	2	4
(Australia) S Stosur	6	6
Q	(Australia) N Pratt	1	5
2	(Switzerland) M Hingis	6	7

Quarterfinals
Q	(Italy) R Vinci	1	2
3	(Russia) E Dementieva	6	6
(Australia) S Stosur	0	1
2	(Switzerland) M Hingis	6	6

Semifinals
3	(Russia) E Dementieva	4	3
2	(Switzerland) M Hingis	6	6

==== Notes ====
- The winner will receive $182,000 and 430 ranking points.
- The runner-up will receive $97,800 and 300 ranking points.
- The last direct acceptance was Elena Vesnina (ranked 47th).
- The Players' Representative was Ai Sugiyama.
