= 2003 MasterCard German Open – Doubles =

Doubles
- 2003 MasterCard German Open

Final
- Champions: (Spain) Virginia Ruano Pascual (Argentina) Paola Suárez
- Runners-up: (Belgium) Kim Clijsters (Japan) Ai Sugiyama
- Score: 6–3, 4–6, 6–4

Details
- Draw: 28
- Seeds: 8

Events
Singles	Doubles
← 2002 ·	WTA German Open	· 2004 →

Elena Dementieva and Janette Husárová were the defending champions but had different outcomes. Dementieva had to withdraw due to a left foot strain, while Husárová teamed up with Elena Likhovtseva and reached the semifinals.

Virginia Ruano Pascual and Paola Suárez won the title, defeating Kim Clijsters and Ai Sugiyama 6–3, 4–6, 6–4 in the final. It was the 20th title for Ruano Pascual and the 27th title for Suárez in their respective double's careers. It was also the 2nd title for the pair during this season after their win in Charleston.

== Seeds ==
The first four seeds received a bye into the second round.

1. (Spain) Virginia Ruano Pascual / (Argentina) Paola Suárez (champions)
2. (Slovakia) Janette Husárová / (Russia) Elena Likhovtseva (semifinals)
3. (Belgium) Kim Clijsters / (Japan) Ai Sugiyama (final)
4. (Federal Republic of Yugoslavia) Jelena Dokic / (Russia) Nadia Petrova (quarterfinals)
5. (Russia) Svetlana Kuznetsova / (United States) Martina Navratilova (quarterfinals)
6. (Slovakia) Daniela Hantuchová / (United States) Chanda Rubin (quarterfinals)
7. (France) Nathalie Dechy / (France) Émilie Loit (quarterfinals)
8. (Spain) Conchita Martínez / (Uzbekistan) Iroda Tulyaganova (second round)

== Draw ==
=== Key ===
- Q = Qualifier
- WC = Wild card
- LL = Lucky loser
- Alt = Alternate
- SE = Special exempt
- PR = Protected ranking
- ITF = ITF entry
- JE = Junior exempt
- w/o = Walkover
- r = Retired
- d = Defaulted
- SR = Special ranking

=== Finals ===
Semifinals
1	(Spain) Virginia Ruano Pascual (Argentina) Paola Suárez	6	6
(South Africa) Liezel Huber (Bulgaria) Magdalena Maleeva	3	1
3	(Belgium) Kim Clijsters (Japan) Ai Sugiyama	6	6
2	(Slovakia) Janette Husárová (Russia) Elena Likhovtseva	1	4

Final
1	(Spain) Virginia Ruano Pascual (Argentina) Paola Suárez	6	4	6
3	(Belgium) Kim Clijsters (Japan) Ai Sugiyama	3	6	4

=== Top half ===
First round
(Netherlands) K Boogert (Spain) M Serna	6	6
(Germany) M Müller (Germany) B Rittner	4	2
(Russia) E Dementieva (Russia) A Myskina
(Spain) MJ Martínez (Spain) A Medina Garrigues	w/o
(Austria) B Schett (Switzerland) P Schnyder	5	5
6	(Slovakia) D Hantuchová (United States) C Rubin	7	7
(Belgium) E Callens (Croatia) I Majoli	7^{10}	4	3
(Croatia) J Kostanić (Hungary) K Marosi	6^{8}	6	6
(South Africa) L Huber (Bulgaria) M Maleeva	6	7
(Slovenia) M Matevžič (Slovakia) H Nagyová	3	5
(Slovenia) T Križan (Slovenia) K Srebotnik	5	3
8	(Spain) C Martínez (Uzbekistan) I Tulyaganova	7	6

Second round
1	(Spain) V Ruano Pascual (Argentina) P Suárez	6	6
(Netherlands) K Boogert (Spain) M Serna	4	3
(Spain) MJ Martínez (Spain) A Medina Garrigues	6	3	1
6	(Slovakia) D Hantuchová (United States) C Rubin	4	6	6
4	(Federal Republic of Yugoslavia) J Dokic (Russia) N Petrova	7	6
(Croatia) J Kostanić (Hungary) K Marosi	5	3
(South Africa) L Huber (Bulgaria) M Maleeva	6	6
8	(Spain) C Martínez (Uzbekistan) I Tulyaganova	4	2

Quarterfinals
1	(Spain) V Ruano Pascual (Argentina) P Suárez	6	6
6	(Slovakia) D Hantuchová (United States) C Rubin	0	3
4	(Federal Republic of Yugoslavia) J Dokic (Russia) N Petrova	4	5
(South Africa) L Huber (Bulgaria) M Maleeva	6	7

Semifinals
1	(Spain) V Ruano Pascual (Argentina) P Suárez	6	6
(South Africa) L Huber (Bulgaria) M Maleeva	3	1

=== Bottom half ===
First round
7	(France) N Dechy (France) É Loit	6	6
(Argentina) P Tarabini (Netherlands) C Vis	3	2
(Australia) C Barclay (Germany) K Freye	4	3
WC	(Germany) A Barna (Germany) M Weingärtner	6	6
(France) C Dhenin (Paraguay) R Neffa-de los Ríos	6	7^{7}
WC	(Germany) AL Grönefeld (United States) M Shaughnessy	1	6^{4}
5	(Russia) S Kuznetsova (United States) M Navratilova	6	6
(France) M Bartoli (United States) M Irvin	3	1
(Australia) T Musgrave (United States) A Spears	5	3
(Italy) S Farina Elia (Italy) T Garbin	7	6
(United States) S Reeves (United States) M Tu	5	6	6
Q	(Germany) A Bachmann (Germany) V Henke	7	3	4

Second round
7	(France) N Dechy (France) É Loit	6	6
WC	(Germany) A Barna (Germany) M Weingärtner	1	3
(France) C Dhenin (Paraguay) R Neffa-de los Ríos	1	0
3	(Belgium) K Clijsters (Japan) A Sugiyama	6	6
5	(Russia) S Kuznetsova (United States) M Navratilova	6	6
(Italy) S Farina Elia (Italy) T Garbin	1	2
(United States) S Reeves (United States) M Tu	4	3
2	(Slovakia) J Husárová (Russia) E Likhovtseva	6	6

Quarterfinals
7	(France) N Dechy (France) É Loit	3	6	4
3	(Belgium) K Clijsters (Japan) A Sugiyama	6	3	6
5	(Russia) S Kuznetsova (United States) M Navratilova	6	2	5
2	(Slovakia) J Husárová (Russia) E Likhovtseva	3	6	7

Semifinals
3	(Belgium) K Clijsters (Japan) A Sugiyama	6	6
2	(Slovakia) J Husárová (Russia) E Likhovtseva	1	4
