= 2006 Toray Pan Pacific Open – Doubles =

Doubles
- 2006 Toray Pan Pacific Open

Final
- Champions: (United States) Lisa Raymond (Australia) Samantha Stosur
- Runners-up: (Zimbabwe) Cara Black (Australia) Rennae Stubbs
- Score: 6–2, 6–1

Details
- Draw: 16
- Seeds: 4

Events
Singles	Doubles
← 2005 ·	Toray Pan Pacific Open	· 2007 →

The doubles tournament at the 2006 Toray Pan Pacific Open took place between 30 January and 5 February on the indoor hard courts of the Tokyo Metropolitan Gymnasium in Tokyo, Japan. Lisa Raymond and Samantha Stosur won the title, defeating Cara Black and Rennae Stubbs in the final.

== Seeds ==
1. (Zimbabwe) Cara Black / (Australia) Rennae Stubbs (final)
2. (United States) Lisa Raymond / (Australia) Samantha Stosur (champions)
3. (Slovakia) Daniela Hantuchová / (Japan) Ai Sugiyama (quarterfinals)
4. (Russia) Elena Dementieva / (United States) Corina Morariu (first round)

== Draw ==
=== Key ===
- Q = Qualifier
- WC = Wild card
- LL = Lucky loser
- Alt = Alternate
- ITF = ITF entry
- PR = Protected ranking
- SR = Special ranking
- SE = Special exempt
- JE = Junior exempt
- JR = Junior Accelerator Programme entrant
- CO = College Accelerator Programme entrant
- NG = Next Gen Accelerator Program entrant
- w/o = Walkover
- r = Retired
- d = Defaulted

First round
1	(Zimbabwe) C Black (Australia) R Stubbs	6	6
WC	(Japan) A Nakamura (Japan) M Saeki	3	2
(Czech Republic) I Benešová (United States) M Tu	3	6	6
(United States) J Craybas (Czech Republic) K Peschke	6	3	4
3	(Slovakia) D Hantuchová (Japan) A Sugiyama	6	6
(Slovenia) T Križan (United States) J Russell	3	2
(Latvia) L Dekmeijere (Russia) A Rodionova	2	2
(Australia) N Pratt (Italy) M Santangelo	6	6
(Russia) E Likhovtseva (Russia) A Myskina	4	3
(Indonesia) A Widjaja (China) J Zheng	6	6
(Serbia and Montenegro) A Ivanovic (Russia) M Kirilenko	6	4	6
4	(Russia) E Dementieva (United States) C Morariu	3	6	2
Q	(United States) C Gullickson (United States) B Mattek	6	7
(Japan) S Asagoe (Slovenia) K Srebotnik	4	6^{3}
(France) N Dechy (Czech Republic) N Vaidišová	6^{4}	2
2	(United States) L Raymond (Australia) S Stosur	7	6

Quarterfinals
1	(Zimbabwe) C Black (Australia) R Stubbs	6	7
(Czech Republic) I Benešová (United States) M Tu	0	5
3	(Slovakia) D Hantuchová (Japan) A Sugiyama	2	6	3
(Australia) N Pratt (Italy) M Santangelo	6	3	6
(Indonesia) A Widjaja (China) J Zheng	0	6	1
(Serbia and Montenegro) A Ivanovic (Russia) M Kirilenko	6	2	6
Q	(United States) C Gullickson (United States) B Mattek	6	3	1
2	(United States) L Raymond (Australia) S Stosur	3	6	6

Semifinals
1	(Zimbabwe) C Black (Australia) R Stubbs	6	6
(Australia) N Pratt (Italy) M Santangelo	3	1
(Serbia and Montenegro) A Ivanovic (Russia) M Kirilenko	4	1
2	(United States) L Raymond (Australia) S Stosur	6	6

Final
1	(Zimbabwe) C Black (Australia) R Stubbs	2	1
2	(United States) L Raymond (Australia) S Stosur	6	6
