= 1999 Family Circle Cup – Singles qualifying =

Singles qualifying
- 1999 Family Circle Cup

Events
Singles	Doubles
← 1998 ·	Family Circle Cup	· 2000 →

The 1999 Family Circle Cup was a WTA tennis tournament, played on outdoor clay courts.

== Players ==
=== Seeds ===
1. n.a.
2. (United States) Lilia Osterloh (qualifier)
3. (Russia) Tatiana Panova (qualifier)
4. (Australia) Nicole Pratt (first round)
5. (Latvia) Larisa Neiland (qualifying competition, lucky loser)
6. (Greece) Christína Papadáki (qualifying competition)
7. (Canada) Jana Nejedly (first round)
8. (Romania) Raluca Sandu (first round)
9. (Switzerland) Emmanuelle Gagliardi (qualifier)

=== Qualifiers ===
1. (Switzerland) Emmanuelle Gagliardi
2. (Russia) Elena Makarova
3. (Argentina) Paola Suárez
4. (United States) Alexandra Stevenson
5. (Czech Republic) Adriana Gerši
6. (Russia) Tatiana Panova
7. (United States) Sandra Cacic
8. (United States) Lilia Osterloh

=== Lucky loser ===
1. (Latvia) Larisa Neiland

== Qualifying draw ==
=== Key ===
- Q = Qualifier
- WC = Wild card
- LL = Lucky loser
- Alt = Alternate
- SE = Special exempt
- PR = Protected ranking
- ITF = ITF entry
- JE = Junior exempt
- w/o = Walkover
- r = Retired
- d = Defaulted
- SR = Special ranking

=== First qualifier ===
First round
9	(Switzerland) Emmanuelle Gagliardi	6	6
(Russia) Eugenia Kulikovskaya	1	3
(United States) Mashona Washington	6	6
(Slovakia) Radka Zrubáková	4	1

Qualifying competition
9	(Switzerland) Emmanuelle Gagliardi	6	6
(United States) Mashona Washington	4	3

=== Second qualifier ===
First round
WC	(South Africa) Jessica Steck	3	6^{4}
(Russia) Elena Makarova	6	7^{7}
(United States) Samantha Reeves	5	5
5	(Latvia) Larisa Neiland	7	7

Qualifying competition
(Russia) Elena Makarova	3	6	6
5	(Latvia) Larisa Neiland	6	3	4

=== Third qualifier ===
First round
4	(Australia) Nicole Pratt	3	2
(Argentina) Paola Suárez	6	6
(United States) Karin Miller	6	2	7^{7}
(United States) Lori McNeil	2	6	6^{2}

Qualifying competition
(Argentina) Paola Suárez	6	6
(United States) Karin Miller	0	1

=== Fourth qualifier ===
First round
(Argentina) Mariana Díaz Oliva	6^{2}	5
(United States) Alexandra Stevenson	7^{7}	7
WC	(Kazakhstan) Irina Selyutina	7^{7}	6
7	(Canada) Jana Nejedly	6^{2}	1

Qualifying competition
(United States) Alexandra Stevenson	6	4	6
WC	(Kazakhstan) Irina Selyutina	3	6	4

=== Fifth qualifier ===
First round
8	(Romania) Raluca Sandu	2	3
(Poland) Aleksandra Olsza	6	6
(Czech Republic) Adriana Gerši	6	6
WC	(United States) Julie Scott	0	1

Qualifying competition
(Poland) Aleksandra Olsza	6	4	4
(Czech Republic) Adriana Gerši	3	6	6

=== Sixth qualifier ===
First round
(Germany) Jana Kandarr	2	4
(Italy) Adriana Serra Zanetti	6	6
(Bulgaria) Pavlina Stoyanova	3	3
3	(Russia) Tatiana Panova	6	6

Qualifying competition
(Italy) Adriana Serra Zanetti	6	4	5
3	(Russia) Tatiana Panova	3	6	7

=== Seventh qualifier ===
First round
6	(Greece) Christína Papadáki	7^{7}	1	7^{7}
Alt	(Paraguay) Larissa Schaerer	6^{5}	6	6^{2}
(United States) Sandra Cacic	6	6
(Slovenia) Tina Križan	3	4

Qualifying competition
6	(Greece) Christína Papadáki	6	4	2
(United States) Sandra Cacic	4	6	6

=== Eighth qualifier ===
First round
(Russia) Nadia Petrova	6	6
(Czech Republic) Sandra Kleinová	3	3
(Italy) Tathiana Garbin	4	4
2/WC	(United States) Lilia Osterloh	6	6

Qualifying competition
(Russia) Nadia Petrova	1	6	1
2/WC	(United States) Lilia Osterloh	6	3	6
