= 1997 Family Circle Cup – Singles =

Singles
- 1997 Family Circle Cup

Final
- Champion: (Switzerland) Martina Hingis
- Runner-up: (United States) Monica Seles
- Score: 3–6, 6–3, 7–6

Details
- Draw: 56
- Seeds: 16

Events
Singles	Doubles
← 1996 ·	Family Circle Cup	· 1998 →

Martina Hingis defeated Monica Seles in the final, 3–6, 6–3, 7–6 to win the singles tennis title at the 1997 Family Circle Cup.

Arantxa Sánchez Vicario was the defending champion, but lost in the third round to Amanda Coetzer.

== Seeds ==
A champion seed is indicated in bold text while text in italics indicates the round in which that seed was eliminated. The top nine seeds received a bye to the second round.

1. (Switzerland) **Martina Hingis (champion)**
2. (Spain) Arantxa Sánchez Vicario (third round)
3. (Czech Republic) Jana Novotná (third round)
4. (United States) Monica Seles (final)
5. (Spain) Conchita Martínez (semifinals)
6. (United States) Lindsay Davenport (quarterfinals)
7. (Germany) Anke Huber (quarterfinals)
8. (Romania) Irina Spîrlea (third round)
9. (Croatia) Iva Majoli (third round)
10. (Slovakia) Karina Habšudová (first round)
11. (United States) Mary Joe Fernández (first round)
12. (Austria) Barbara Paulus (third round)
13. (South Africa) Amanda Coetzer (quarterfinals)
14. (Netherlands) Brenda Schultz-McCarthy (semifinals)
15. (Russia) Elena Likhovtseva (first round)
16. (Bulgaria) Magdalena Maleeva (second round)

== Draw ==
=== Key ===
- Q = Qualifier
- WC = Wild card
- LL = Lucky loser
- Alt = Alternate
- ITF = ITF entry
- PR = Protected ranking
- SR = Special ranking
- SE = Special exempt
- JE = Junior exempt
- JR = Junior Accelerator Programme entrant
- CO = College Accelerator Programme entrant
- NG = Next Gen Accelerator Program entrant
- w/o = Walkover
- r = Retired
- d = Defaulted

=== Finals ===
Semifinals
1	(Switzerland) **Martina Hingis**	5	**6**	**6**
14	(Netherlands) Brenda Schultz-McCarthy	**7**	3	2
4	(United States) **Monica Seles**	**6**	**6**
5	(Spain) Conchita Martínez	3	4

Final
1	(Switzerland) **Martina Hingis**	3	**6**	**7**
4	(United States) Monica Seles	**6**	3	6

=== Top half ===
==== Section 1 ====
First round
(Germany) **B Rittner**	**6**	4	**7**
(Italy) G Pizzichini	1	**6**	5
(Austria) **B Schett**	4	**6**	**6**
(South Africa) J Kruger	**6**	0	0
(France) **A Fusai**	**7**	**6**
10	(Slovakia) K Habšudová	6	3
16	(Bulgaria) **M Maleeva**	**7**	**6**
(Czech Republic) P Langrová	5	4
Q	(Germany) A Glass	3	**6**	4
Q	(Germany) **W Probst**	**6**	3	**6**
Q	(Spain) **C Torrens Valero**	3	**7**	**6**
(Italy) F Perfetti	**6**	5	1

Second round
1	(Switzerland) **M Hingis**	**6**	**6**
(Germany) B Rittner	0	4
(Austria) **B Schett**	**6**	**6**
(France) A Fusai	0	1
16	(Bulgaria) M Maleeva
Q	(Germany) **W Probst**	**w/o**
Q	(Spain) C Torrens Valero	6	4
8	(Romania) **I Spîrlea**	**7**	**6**

Third round
1	(Switzerland) **M Hingis**	**6**	**6**
(Austria) B Schett	3	3
Q	(Germany) **W Probst**	**4**
8	(Romania) I Spîrlea	1	r

Quarterfinals
1	(Switzerland) **M Hingis**	**6**	**6**
Q	(Germany) W Probst	2	0

==== Section 2 ====
First round
(Switzerland) **P Schnyder**	**6**	**7**
WC	(United States) T Whitlinger-Jones	2	5
(Thailand) T Tanasugarn	1	4
Q	(Spain) **G León García**	**6**	**6**
(Russia) E Makarova	**6**	6	4
14	(Netherlands) **B Schultz-McCarthy**	3	**7**	**6**
12	(Austria) **B Paulus**	**6**	**6**
Q	(Austria) S Dopfer	0	2
Q	(Spain) **V Ruano-Pascual**	**6**	**6**
(Canada) P Hy-Boulais	2	3
(South Africa) **M de Swardt**	**6**	**2**
(Belarus) N Zvereva	4	1	r

Second round
3	(Czech Republic) **J Novotná**	3	**7**	**6**
(Switzerland) P Schnyder	**6**	5	1
Q	(Spain) G León García	4	4
14	(Netherlands) **B Schultz-McCarthy**	**6**	**6**
12	(Austria) **B Paulus**	**6**	**6**
Q	(Spain) V Ruano-Pascual	4	1
(South Africa) M de Swardt	2	0
6	(United States) **L Davenport**	**6**	**6**

Third round
3	(Czech Republic) J Novotná	3	3
14	(Netherlands) **B Schultz-McCarthy**	**6**	**6**
12	(Austria) B Paulus	2	4
6	(United States) **L Davenport**	**6**	**6**

Quarterfinals
14	(Netherlands) **B Schultz-McCarthy**	4	**6**	**6**
6	(United States) L Davenport	**6**	4	2

=== Bottom half ===
==== Section 3 ====
First round
(United States) **L Raymond**	**6**	**6**
(United States) L Wild	0	1
(Romania) **R Dragomir**	5	**7**	**6**
(Slovakia) K Studeníková	**7**	6	4
Q	(Canada) R Simpson	**6**	4	4
9	(Croatia) **I Majoli**	4	**6**	**6**
15	(Russia) E Likhovtseva	**6**	3	4
(Italy) **S Farina**	1	**6**	**6**
(Romania) C Cristea	4	0
(Czech Republic) **A Gerši**	**6**	**6**
WC	(Germany) M Weingärtner	4	6
(Chinese Taipei) **S-T Wang**	**6**	**7**

Second round
7	(Germany) **A Huber**	**6**	**6**
(United States) L Raymond	0	2
(Romania) R Dragomir	**6**	4	1
9	(Croatia) **I Majoli**	3	**6**	**6**
(Italy) S Farina	4	3
Q	(Czech Republic) **A Gerši**	**6**	**6**
(Chinese Taipei) S-T Wang	3	3
4	(United States) **M Seles**	**6**	**6**

Third round
7	(Germany) **A Huber**	3	**7**	**6**
9	(Croatia) I Majoli	**6**	6	3
Q	(Czech Republic) A Gerši	2	6
4	(United States) **M Seles**	**6**	**7**

Quarterfinals
7	(Germany) A Huber	3	0
4	(United States) **M Seles**	**6**	**6**

==== Section 4 ====
First round
(Latvia) L Savchenko	5	0
Q	(Belarus) **O Barabanschikova**	**7**	**6**
(United States) A Grossman	**6**	2	3
(Japan) **A Sugiyama**	1	**6**	**6**
(United States) **J Capriati**	**6**	4	**7**
11	(United States) M J Fernández	3	**6**	6
13	(South Africa) **A Coetzer**	**6**	**6**
(Slovakia) H Nagyová	2	3
WC	(Argentina) I Gorrochategui	6	2
(Argentina) **P Suárez**	**7**	**6**
(France) **S Pitkowski**	0	**6**	**7**
(Argentina) F Labat	**6**	4	5

Second round
5	(Spain) **C Martínez**	6	**6**	**6**
Q	(Belarus) O Barabanschikova	**7**	4	3
(Japan) A Sugiyama	1	0
(United States) **J Capriati**	**6**	**6**
13	(South Africa) **A Coetzer**	4	**6**	**4**
(Argentina) P Suárez	**6**	2	0/r
(France) S Pitkowski	2	2
2	(Spain) **A Sánchez Vicario**	**6**	**6**

Third round
5	(Spain) **C Martínez**	**6**	5	**6**
(United States) J Capriati	0	**7**	4
13	(South Africa) **A Coetzer**	**6**	5	**6**
2	(Spain) A Sánchez Vicario	2	**7**	0

Quarterfinals
5	(Spain) **C Martínez**	**6**	**6**
13	(South Africa) A Coetzer	1	3
