= 1996 Budapest Lotto Open – Singles =

Singles
- 1996 Budapest Lotto Open

Final
- Champion: (Romania) Ruxandra Dragomir
- Runner-up: (Austria) Melanie Schnell
- Score: 7–6, 6–1

Details
- Draw: 32
- Seeds: 8

Events
Singles	Doubles
Budapest Lotto Open	· 1997 →

This was the first edition of the tournament.

Sixth-seeded Ruxandra Dragomir won in the final 7–6, 6–1 against Melanie Schnell.

== Seeds ==
A champion seed is indicated in bold text while text in italics indicates the round in which that seed was eliminated.

1. (France) Julie Halard-Decugis (quarterfinals)
2. (Germany) Sabine Hack (second round)
3. (Russia) Elena Makarova (second round)
4. (United States) Ann Grossman (first round)
5. (Slovakia) Katarína Studeníková (second round)
6. (Romania) **Ruxandra Dragomir (champion)**
7. (Bulgaria) Elena Pampoulova (semifinals)
8. (United States) Tami Whitlinger-Jones (second round)

== Draw ==
=== Key ===
- Q = Qualifier
- WC = Wild card
- LL = Lucky loser
- Alt = Alternate
- ITF = ITF entry
- PR = Protected ranking
- SR = Special ranking
- SE = Special exempt
- JE = Junior exempt
- JR = Junior Accelerator Programme entrant
- CO = College Accelerator Programme entrant
- NG = Next Gen Accelerator Program entrant
- w/o = Walkover
- r = Retired
- d = Defaulted

First round
1	(France) **J Halard-Decugis**	**6**	**6**
(Austria) P Schwarz	3	1
Q	(Luxembourg) **A Kremer**	**6**	**6**
(Finland) N Dahlman	1	2
(Czech Republic) **R Bobková**	**6**	**7**
(Romania) C Cristea	2	5
(United States) K Adams	3	2
6	(Romania) **R Dragomir**	**6**	**6**
3	(Russia) **E Makarova**	**6**	**6**
WC	(Hungary) R Vidáts	3	3
Q	(United States) **M Shaughnessy**	**6**	**6**
(Slovakia) J Husárová	4	1
(United States) E deLone	**7**	6	4
(Czech Republic) **S Kleinová**	6	**7**	**6**
WC	(Hungary) M Petkes	2	2
7	(Bulgaria) **E Pampoulova**	**6**	**6**
8	(United States) **T Whitlinger-Jones**	**6**	**6**
Q	(Czech Republic) R Pelikánová	2	0
(France) N Dechy	4	5
(Hungary) **A Temesvári**	**6**	**7**
(France) **S Pitkowski**	**6**	**7**
(Austria) B Reinstadler	2	5
Q	(Hungary) **R Kuti-Kis**	**6**	4	**6**
4	(United States) A Grossman	2	**6**	1
5	(Slovakia) **K Studeníková**	**6**	**6**
(Venezuela) M Vento	1	2
(Austria) **M Schnell**	**6**	3	**6**
(Madagascar) D Randriantefy	0	**6**	2
(Bulgaria) K Maleeva	6	3
(Slovakia) **D Krajčovičová**	**7**	**6**
(United States) L Poruri	4	1
2	(Germany) **S Hack**	**6**	**6**

Second round
1	(France) **J Halard-Decugis**	**7**	**6**
Q	(Luxembourg) A Kremer	5	2
(Czech Republic) R Bobková	0	**6**	1
6	(Romania) **R Dragomir**	**6**	2	**6**
3	(Russia) E Makarova	1	3
Q	(United States) **M Shaughnessy**	**6**	**6**
(Czech Republic) S Kleinová	3	1
7	(Bulgaria) **E Pampoulova**	**6**	**6**
8	(United States) T Whitlinger-Jones	1	4
(Hungary) **A Temesvári**	**6**	**6**
(France) S Pitkowski	4	3
Q	(Hungary) **R Kuti-Kis**	**6**	**6**
5	(Slovakia) K Studeníková	**6**	6	5
(Austria) **M Schnell**	2	**7**	**7**
(Slovakia) **D Krajčovičová**	1	**6**	**6**
2	(Germany) S Hack	**6**	4	2

Quarterfinals
1	(France) J Halard-Decugis	4	2
6	(Romania) **R Dragomir**	**6**	**6**
Q	(United States) M Shaughnessy	**6**	3	3
7	(Bulgaria) **E Pampoulova**	4	**6**	**6**
(Hungary) A Temesvári	**7**	4	3
Q	(Hungary) **R Kuti-Kis**	6	**6**	**6**
(Austria) **M Schnell**	**6**	**6**
(Slovakia) D Krajčovičová	2	2

Semifinals
6	(Romania) **R Dragomir**	**6**	**7**
7	(Bulgaria) E Pampoulova	1	6
Q	(Hungary) R Kuti-Kis	2	1
(Austria) **M Schnell**	**6**	**6**

Final
6	(Romania) **Ruxandra Dragomir**	**7**	**6**
(Austria) Melanie Schnell	6	1
