= 1998 Family Circle Cup – Singles =

Singles
- 1998 Family Circle Cup

Final
- Champion: (South Africa) Amanda Coetzer
- Runner-up: (Romania) Irina Spîrlea
- Score: 6–3, 6–4

Details
- Draw: 56
- Seeds: 16

Events
Singles	Doubles
← 1997 ·	Family Circle Cup	· 1999 →

Amanda Coetzer defeated Irina Spîrlea in the final, 6–3, 6–4 to win the singles tennis title at the 1998 Family Circle Cup.

Martina Hingis was the reigning champion, but did not compete that year.

== Seeds ==
A champion seed is indicated in bold text while text in italics indicates the round in which that seed was eliminated. The top eight seeds received a bye to the second round.

1. (United States) Lindsay Davenport (quarterfinals)
2. (Czech Republic) Jana Novotná (third round)
3. (United States) Monica Seles (semifinals)
4. (South Africa) **Amanda Coetzer (champion)**
5. (France) Mary Pierce (second round)
6. (Croatia) Iva Majoli (second round)
7. (Spain) Arantxa Sánchez-Vicario (second round)
8. (Spain) Conchita Martínez (second round)
9. (Romania) Irina Spîrlea (final)
10. (France) Nathalie Tauziat (second round)
11. (France) Sandrine Testud (first round)
12. (Germany) Anke Huber (third round)
13. (Japan) Ai Sugiyama (first round)
14. (Switzerland) Patty Schnyder (quarterfinals)
15. (United States) Lisa Raymond (semifinals)
16. (Belarus) Natasha Zvereva (third round)

== Draw ==
=== Key ===
- Q = Qualifier
- WC = Wild card
- LL = Lucky loser
- Alt = Alternate
- SE = Special exempt
- PR = Protected ranking
- ITF = ITF entry
- JE = Junior exempt
- w/o = Walkover
- r = Retired
- d = Defaulted
- SR = Special ranking

=== Finals ===
Semifinals
9	(Romania) **Irina Spîrlea**	**6**	1	**7**
3	(United States) Monica Seles	4	**6**	6
4	(South Africa) **Amanda Coetzer**	**6**	**6**
15	(United States) Lisa Raymond	4	1

Final
9	(Romania) Irina Spîrlea	3	4
4	(South Africa) **Amanda Coetzer**	**6**	**6**

=== Top half ===
==== Section 1 ====
First round
(United States) C Rubin	4	4
(United States) **C Morariu**	**6**	**6**
(Japan) **N Sawamatsu**	**6**	1	**6**
(Indonesia) Y Basuki	1	**6**	1
(Romania) **R Dragomir**	**6**	**6**
11	(France) S Testud	3	3
9	(Romania) **I Spîrlea**	**6**	**6**
(Germany) M Babel	3	3
Q	(Germany) W Probst	1	1
(Argentina) **F Labat**	**6**	**6**
(Thailand) T Tanasugarn	**7**	4	4
(Poland) **M Grzybowska**	5	**6**	**6**

Second round
1	(United States) **L Davenport**	**6**	**6**
(United States) C Morariu	3	0
(Japan) N Sawamatsu	0	2
(Romania) **R Dragomir**	**6**	**6**
9	(Romania) **I Spîrlea**	6	**6**	**6**
(Argentina) F Labat	**7**	2	0
(Poland) **M Grzybowska**	**7**	**6**
8	(Spain) C Martínez	5	2

Third round
1	(United States) **L Davenport**	1	**6**	**7**
(Romania) R Dragomir	**6**	3	5
9	(Romania) **I Spîrlea**	**6**	**6**
(Poland) M Grzybowska	3	4

Quarterfinals
1	(United States) L Davenport	**7**	4	6
9	(Romania) **I Spîrlea**	6	**6**	**7**

==== Section 2 ====
First round
Q	(United States) S Cacic	**6**	3	1
(Austria) **B Paulus**	3	**6**	**6**
(Netherlands) **B Schultz-McCarthy**	**6**	**7**
(Belarus) O Barabanschikova	1	6
(Spain) G León García	4	5
16	(Belarus) **N Zvereva**	**6**	**7**
14	(Switzerland) **P Schnyder**	**6**	**7**
Q	(France) A Mauresmo	3	6
WC	(United States) **L McNeil**	6	**6**	**6**
WC	(United States) J Capriati	**7**	4	4
WC	(South Africa) **M de Swardt**	**5**
(Czech Republic) D Chládková	0	r

Second round
3	(United States) **M Seles**	**6**	**0**
(Austria) B Paulus	2	1	r
(Netherlands) B Schultz-McCarthy	2	2
16	(Belarus) **N Zvereva**	**6**	**6**
14	(Switzerland) **P Schnyder**	**6**	**6**
WC	(United States) L McNeil	3	2
WC	(South Africa) **M de Swardt**	**6**	**7**
6	(Croatia) I Majoli	4	5

Third round
3	(United States) **M Seles**	**6**	6	**6**
16	(Belarus) N Zvereva	0	**7**	2
14	(Switzerland) **P Schnyder**	**6**	**6**
WC	(South Africa) M de Swardt	3	2

Quarterfinals
3	(United States) **M Seles**	4	**6**	**7**
14	(Switzerland) P Schnyder	**6**	3	6

=== Bottom half ===
==== Section 3 ====
First round
Q	(Germany) **A Glass**	**7**	**6**
Q	(Romania) C Cristea	5	2
Q	(Spain) **C Torrens Valero**	**7**	**6**
(China) F Li	5	2
(France) **A Fusai**	2	**7**	**6**
13	(Japan) A Sugiyama	**6**	5	4
10	(France) **N Tauziat**	**6**	**6**
(Venezuela) M Vento	4	1
(Spain) M Sánchez Lorenzo	4	**6**	4
(Spain) **V Ruano Pascual**	**6**	2	**6**
(Italy) **S Farina**	**5**
Q	(Ukraine) O Lugina	1	r

Second round
7	(Spain) A Sánchez-Vicario	**7**	5	2
Q	(Germany) **A Glass**	6	**7**	**6**
Q	(Spain) C Torrens Valero	6	**7**	4
(France) **A Fusai**	**7**	6	**6**
10	(France) N Tauziat	5	1
(Spain) **V Ruano Pascual**	**7**	**6**
(Italy) S Farina	4	3
4	(South Africa) **A Coetzer**	**6**	**6**

Third round
Q	(Germany) **A Glass**	**6**	**7**
(France) A Fusai	3	6
(Spain) V Ruano Pascual	0	4
4	(South Africa) **A Coetzer**	**6**	**6**

Quarterfinals
Q	(Germany) A Glass	**6**	6	r
4	(South Africa) **A Coetzer**	4	**7**

==== Section 4 ====
First round
(Austria) B Schett	3	**6**	4
WC	(United States) **A Miller**	**6**	2	**6**
(Italy) **R Grande**	**6**	1	**6**
(France) A-G Sidot	3	**6**	4
(Chinese Taipei) S-T Wang	1	**6**	1
15	(United States) **L Raymond**	**6**	4	**6**
12	(Germany) A Huber	5	6
(Spain) **M Serna**	**7**	**7**
Q	(Russia) T Panova	**6**	2	4
(Russia) **E Likhovtseva**	3	**6**	**6**
(South Africa) J Kruger	6	2
(Czech Republic) **S Kleinová**	**7**	**6**

Second round
5	(France) M Pierce	3	3
WC	(United States) **A Miller**	**6**	**6**
(Italy) R Grande	1	6
15	(United States) **L Raymond**	**6**	**7**
(Spain) **M Serna**	**7**	2	**6**
(Russia) E Likhovtseva	5	**6**	2
(Czech Republic) S Kleinová	4	3
2	(Czech Republic) **J Novotná**	**6**	**6**

Third round
WC	(United States) A Miller	**6**	2	3
15	(United States) **L Raymond**	1	**6**	**6**
(Spain) **M Serna**	3	**6**	**6**
2	(Czech Republic) J Novotná	**6**	4	2

Quarterfinals
15	(United States) **L Raymond**	**6**	**6**
(Spain) M Serna	4	1
