= 1997 Budapest Lotto Open – Singles =

Singles
- 1997 Budapest Lotto Open

Final
- Champion: (South Africa) Amanda Coetzer
- Runner-up: (Belgium) Sabine Appelmans
- Score: 6–1, 6–3

Details
- Draw: 32
- Seeds: 8

Events
Singles	Doubles
← 1996 ·	Budapest Lotto Open	· 1998 →

In the women's singles at the 1997 Budapest Lotto Open tennis tournament, Ruxandra Dragomir was the defending champion but lost in the second round to Joannette Kruger.

Second-seeded Amanda Coetzer won in the final 6–1, 6–3 against Sabine Appelmans.

== Seeds ==
A champion seed is indicated in bold text while text in italics indicates the round in which that seed was eliminated.

1. (Slovakia) Karina Habšudová (semifinals)
2. (South Africa) **Amanda Coetzer (champion)**
3. (Romania) Ruxandra Dragomir (second round)
4. (Belgium) Sabine Appelmans (final)
5. (Sweden) Åsa Carlsson (first round)
6. (Slovakia) Katarína Studeníková (first round)
7. (Slovakia) Henrieta Nagyová (semifinals)
8. (France) Alexandra Fusai (quarterfinals)

== Draw ==
=== Key ===
- Q = Qualifier
- WC = Wild card
- LL = Lucky loser
- Alt = Alternate
- ITF = ITF entry
- PR = Protected ranking
- SR = Special ranking
- SE = Special exempt
- JE = Junior exempt
- JR = Junior Accelerator Programme entrant
- CO = College Accelerator Programme entrant
- NG = Next Gen Accelerator Program entrant
- w/o = Walkover
- r = Retired
- d = Defaulted

First round
1	(Slovakia) **K Habšudová**	**6**	**6**
(Czech Republic) S Kleinová	2	4
(Austria) K Kschwendt	**7**	2	4
(Germany) **P Begerow**	5	**6**	**6**
(Romania) **C Cristea**	**6**	**6**
(Belgium) S Devillé	3	1
(Argentina) P Suárez	3	1
8	(France) **A Fusai**	**6**	**6**
4	(Belgium) **S Appelmans**	**6**	4	**6**
(Czech Republic) P Langrová	1	**6**	4
Q	(France) **N Dechy**	**7**	**6**
Q	(Hungary) V Csurgo	5	3
(Spain) **C Torrens Valero**	**7**	2	**6**
(Germany) J Kandarr	6	**6**	1
(Austria) **S Dopfer**	0	**6**	**6**
6	(Slovakia) K Studeníková	**6**	4	1
7	(Slovakia) **H Nagyová**	**6**	**7**
(Spain) M Serna	0	5
(South Africa) M de Swardt	5	2
(Spain) **G León García**	**7**	**6**
Q	(South Africa) **J Kruger**	**6**	**6**
Q	(Hungary) R Kuti-Kis	3	1
(Czech Republic) A Gerši	2	1
3	(Romania) **R Dragomir**	**6**	**6**
5	(Sweden) Å Carlsson	3	1
(Germany) **E Wagner**	**6**	**6**
WC	(Hungary) N Köves	5	3
(Slovakia) **R Zrubáková**	**7**	**6**
(Austria) **M Maruska**	**6**	5	**6**
(Germany) A Glass	4	**7**	3
WC	(Hungary) A Temesvári	6	2
2	(South Africa) **A Coetzer**	**7**	**6**

Second round
1	(Slovakia) **K Habšudová**	1	**6**	**6**
(Germany) P Begerow	**6**	2	2
(Romania) C Cristea	**6**	2	4
8	(France) **A Fusai**	3	**6**	**6**
4	(Belgium) **S Appelmans**	**6**	**6**
Q	(France) N Dechy	1	2
(Spain) **C Torrens Valero**	**6**	**6**
(Austria) S Dopfer	2	1
7	(Slovakia) **H Nagyová**	**6**	1	**6**
(Spain) G León García	2	**6**	4
Q	(South Africa) **J Kruger**	**6**	**7**
3	(Romania) R Dragomir	3	5
(Germany) **E Wagner**	3	**6**	**6**
(Slovakia) R Zrubáková	**6**	4	3
(Austria) M Maruska	0	4
2	(South Africa) **A Coetzer**	**6**	**6**

Quarterfinals
1	(Slovakia) **K Habšudová**	**6**	**6**
8	(France) A Fusai	4	3
4	(Belgium) **S Appelmans**	**6**	**6**
(Spain) C Torrens Valero	4	4
7	(Slovakia) **H Nagyová**	4	**6**	**6**
Q	(South Africa) J Kruger	**6**	4	3
(Germany) E Wagner	1	**7**	2
2	(South Africa) **A Coetzer**	**6**	6	**6**

Semifinals
1	(Slovakia) K Habšudová	2	4
4	(Belgium) **S Appelmans**	**6**	**6**
7	(Slovakia) H Nagyová	**7**	1	0
2	(South Africa) **A Coetzer**	6	**6**	**6**

Final
4	(Belgium) Sabine Appelmans	1	3
2	(South Africa) **Amanda Coetzer**	**6**	**6**
