= 1999 Family Circle Cup – Singles =

Singles
- 1999 Family Circle Cup

Final
- Champion: (Switzerland) Martina Hingis
- Runner-up: (Russia) Anna Kournikova
- Score: 6–4, 6–3

Details
- Draw: 56
- Seeds: 16

Events
Singles	Doubles
← 1998 ·	Family Circle Cup	· 2000 →

Martina Hingis defeated Anna Kournikova in the final, 6–4, 6–3 to win the singles tennis title at the 1999 Family Circle Cup.

Amanda Coetzer was the defending champion, but lost in the third round to Henrieta Nagyová.

== Seeds ==
The top eight seeds received a bye to the second round.

1. (Switzerland) Martina Hingis (champion)
2. (United States) Monica Seles (third round)
3. (Czech Republic) Jana Novotná (semifinals)
4. (Spain) Arantxa Sánchez Vicario (second round)
5. (South Africa) Amanda Coetzer (third round)
6. (Switzerland) Patty Schnyder (semifinals)
7. (Russia) Anna Kournikova (final)
8. (France) Amélie Mauresmo (second round)
9. (Romania) Irina Spîrlea (second round)
10. (Spain) Conchita Martínez (third round)
11. (Belarus) Natasha Zvereva (quarterfinals)
12. (Austria) Barbara Schett (third round)
13. (Italy) Silvia Farina (third round)
14. (Russia) Elena Likhovtseva (quarterfinals)
15. (Spain) Magüi Serna (first round)
16. (Slovakia) Henrieta Nagyová (quarterfinals)

== Draw ==
=== Key ===
- Q = Qualifier
- WC = Wild card
- LL = Lucky loser
- Alt = Alternate
- SE = Special exempt
- PR = Protected ranking
- ITF = ITF entry
- JE = Junior exempt
- w/o = Walkover
- r = Retired
- d = Defaulted
- SR = Special ranking

=== Finals ===
Quarterfinals
1	(Switzerland) Martina Hingis	6	7^{7}
11	(Belarus) Natasha Zvereva	0	6^{0}
3	(Czech Republic) Jana Novotná	6	6
16	(Slovakia) Henrieta Nagyová	2	4
7	(Russia) Anna Kournikova	6	2
(Germany) Andrea Glass	2	1^{r}
6	(Switzerland) Patty Schnyder	6	4	7^{7}
14	(Russia) Elena Likhovtseva	3	6	6^{3}

Semifinals
1	(Switzerland) Martina Hingis	6	6
3	(Czech Republic) Jana Novotná	2	3
7	(Russia) Anna Kournikova	6^{5}	6	6
6	(Switzerland) Patty Schnyder	7^{7}	0	3

Final
1	(Switzerland) Martina Hingis	6	6
7	(Russia) Anna Kournikova	4	3

=== Top half ===
==== Section 1 ====
First round
(Austria) S Plischke	6	6
(Germany) B Rittner	3	2
(United Kingdom) S Smith	4	3
(France) A Dechaume-Balleret	6	6
(France) A Fusai	0	0
10	(Spain) C Martínez	6	6
11	(Belarus) N Zvereva	7	6
(Czech Republic) K Hrdličková	5	1
Q	(Argentina) P Suárez	5	7	6
(Venezuela) M Vento	7	5	1
(France) N Dechy	6	6
WC	(United States) M Shaughnessy	2	4

Second round
1	(Switzerland) M Hingis	6	7
(Austria) S Plischke	3	5
(France) A Dechaume-Balleret	3	0
10	(Spain) C Martínez	6	6
11	(Belarus) N Zvereva	6	6
Q	(Argentina) P Suárez	3	1
(France) N Dechy	6	0	6
8	(France) A Mauresmo	4	6	4

Third round
1	(Switzerland) M Hingis	7	6
10	(Spain) C Martínez	5	1
11	(Belarus) N Zvereva	6	7^{7}
(France) N Dechy	3	6^{4}

Quarterfinals
1	(Switzerland) M Hingis	6	7^{7}
11	(Belarus) N Zvereva	0	6^{0}

==== Section 2 ====
First round
(Romania) C Cristea	7^{7}	6
Q	(Czech Republic) A Gerši	6^{5}	2
(Spain) V Ruano Pascual	6	6
(Ukraine) E Tatarkova	2	4
(United States) K Po	2	5
13	(Italy) S Farina	6	7
16	(Slovakia) H Nagyová	6^{3}	6	6
(Colombia) F Zuluaga	7^{7}	4	4
(Italy) R Grande	2	6	7
Q	(United States) A Stevenson	6	4	5
LL	(Latvia) L Neiland	4	0
Q	(Russia) E Makarova	6	6

Second round
3	(Czech Republic) J Novotná	6	6
(Romania) C Cristea	4	4
(Spain) V Ruano Pascual	5	6	3
13	(Italy) S Farina	7	4	6
16	(Slovakia) H Nagyová	6	6
(Italy) R Grande	1	2
Q	(Russia) E Makarova	3	5
5	(South Africa) A Coetzer	6	7

Third round
3	(Czech Republic) J Novotná	5	7	6
13	(Italy) S Farina	7	5	3
16	(Slovakia) H Nagyová	6	6
5	(South Africa) A Coetzer	2	3

Quarterfinals
3	(Czech Republic) J Novotná	6	6
16	(Slovakia) H Nagyová	2	4

=== Bottom half ===
==== Section 3 ====
First round
(Spain) M Sánchez Lorenzo	4	6	6
Q	(Russia) T Panova	6	4	3
WC	(United States) B Rippner	6	6
(South Africa) M de Swardt	2	2
(Luxembourg) A Kremer	1	6^{3}
12	(Austria) B Schett	6	7^{7}
15	(Spain) M Serna	0	6	3
(Germany) A Glass	6	3	6
(Romania) R Dragomir	6	6
Q	(United States) L Osterloh	2	0
Q	(United States) S Cacic	3	3
(Spain) G León García	6	6

Second round
7	(Russia) A Kournikova	2	6	6
(Spain) M Sánchez Lorenzo	6	3	1
WC	(United States) B Rippner	3	6	2
12	(Austria) B Schett	6	4	6
(Germany) A Glass	6	6
(Romania) R Dragomir	3	4
(Spain) G León García	6	6
4	(Spain) A Sánchez Vicario	4	3

Third round
7	(Russia) A Kournikova	7^{8}	6
12	(Austria) B Schett	6^{6}	4
(Germany) A Glass	6	6
(Spain) G León García	4	3

Quarterfinals
7	(Russia) A Kournikova	6	2
(Germany) A Glass	2	1^{r}

==== Section 4 ====
First round
(Zimbabwe) C Black	4	2
(United States) L Raymond	6	6
(Croatia) I Majoli	7	5	6
Q	(Switzerland) E Gagliardi	5	7	4
(Israel) A Smashnova	5	3
9	(Romania) I Spîrlea	7	6
14	(Russia) E Likhovtseva	6	6
(United States) T Snyder	0	3
(United States) C Morariu	6	3	4
(France) A-G Sidot	2	6	6
(Puerto Rico) K Brandi	5	5
WC	(Belarus) O Barabanschikova	7	7

Second round
6	(Switzerland) P Schnyder	6	6
(United States) L Raymond	4	2
(Croatia) I Majoli	1	6	6
9	(Romania) I Spîrlea	6	4	2
14	(Russia) E Likhovtseva	6	6
(France) A-G Sidot	1	1
WC	(Belarus) O Barabanschikova	3	0
2	(United States) M Seles	6	6

Third round
6	(Switzerland) P Schnyder	7^{7}	6
(Croatia) I Majoli	6^{2}	3
14	(Russia) E Likhovtseva	7^{7}	6
2	(United States) M Seles	6^{4}	2

Quarterfinals
6	(Switzerland) P Schnyder	6	4	7^{7}
14	(Russia) E Likhovtseva	3	6	6^{3}

== Qualifying ==
=== Seeds ===
1. n.a.
2. (United States) Lilia Osterloh (qualifier)
3. (Russia) Tatiana Panova (qualifier)
4. (Australia) Nicole Pratt (first round)
5. (Latvia) Larisa Neiland (qualifying competition, lucky loser)
6. (Greece) Christína Papadáki (qualifying competition)
7. (Canada) Jana Nejedly (first round)
8. (Romania) Raluca Sandu (first round)
9. (Switzerland) Emmanuelle Gagliardi (qualifier)

=== Qualifiers ===
1. (Switzerland) Emmanuelle Gagliardi
2. (Russia) Elena Makarova
3. (Argentina) Paola Suárez
4. (United States) Alexandra Stevenson
5. (Czech Republic) Adriana Gerši
6. (Russia) Tatiana Panova
7. (United States) Sandra Cacic
8. (United States) Lilia Osterloh

=== Lucky loser ===
1. (Latvia) Larisa Neiland

== Qualifying draw ==
=== Key ===
- Q = Qualifier
- WC = Wild card
- LL = Lucky loser
- Alt = Alternate
- SE = Special exempt
- PR = Protected ranking
- ITF = ITF entry
- JE = Junior exempt
- w/o = Walkover
- r = Retired
- d = Defaulted
- SR = Special ranking

=== First qualifier ===
First round
9	(Switzerland) Emmanuelle Gagliardi	6	6
(Russia) Eugenia Kulikovskaya	1	3
(United States) Mashona Washington	6	6
(Slovakia) Radka Zrubáková	4	1

Qualifying competition
9	(Switzerland) Emmanuelle Gagliardi	6	6
(United States) Mashona Washington	4	3

=== Second qualifier ===
First round
WC	(South Africa) Jessica Steck	3	6^{4}
(Russia) Elena Makarova	6	7^{7}
(United States) Samantha Reeves	5	5
5	(Latvia) Larisa Neiland	7	7

Qualifying competition
(Russia) Elena Makarova	3	6	6
5	(Latvia) Larisa Neiland	6	3	4

=== Third qualifier ===
First round
4	(Australia) Nicole Pratt	3	2
(Argentina) Paola Suárez	6	6
(United States) Karin Miller	6	2	7^{7}
(United States) Lori McNeil	2	6	6^{2}

Qualifying competition
(Argentina) Paola Suárez	6	6
(United States) Karin Miller	0	1

=== Fourth qualifier ===
First round
(Argentina) Mariana Díaz Oliva	6^{2}	5
(United States) Alexandra Stevenson	7^{7}	7
WC	(Kazakhstan) Irina Selyutina	7^{7}	6
7	(Canada) Jana Nejedly	6^{2}	1

Qualifying competition
(United States) Alexandra Stevenson	6	4	6
WC	(Kazakhstan) Irina Selyutina	3	6	4

=== Fifth qualifier ===
First round
8	(Romania) Raluca Sandu	2	3
(Poland) Aleksandra Olsza	6	6
(Czech Republic) Adriana Gerši	6	6
WC	(United States) Julie Scott	0	1

Qualifying competition
(Poland) Aleksandra Olsza	6	4	4
(Czech Republic) Adriana Gerši	3	6	6

=== Sixth qualifier ===
First round
(Germany) Jana Kandarr	2	4
(Italy) Adriana Serra Zanetti	6	6
(Bulgaria) Pavlina Stoyanova	3	3
3	(Russia) Tatiana Panova	6	6

Qualifying competition
(Italy) Adriana Serra Zanetti	6	4	5
3	(Russia) Tatiana Panova	3	6	7

=== Seventh qualifier ===
First round
6	(Greece) Christína Papadáki	7^{7}	1	7^{7}
Alt	(Paraguay) Larissa Schaerer	6^{5}	6	6^{2}
(United States) Sandra Cacic	6	6
(Slovenia) Tina Križan	3	4

Qualifying competition
6	(Greece) Christína Papadáki	6	4	2
(United States) Sandra Cacic	4	6	6

=== Eighth qualifier ===
First round
(Russia) Nadia Petrova	6	6
(Czech Republic) Sandra Kleinová	3	3
(Italy) Tathiana Garbin	4	4
2/WC	(United States) Lilia Osterloh	6	6

Qualifying competition
(Russia) Nadia Petrova	1	6	1
2/WC	(United States) Lilia Osterloh	6	3	6
