= 1997 Family Circle Cup – Doubles =

Doubles
- 1997 Family Circle Cup

Final
- Champions: (United States) Mary Joe Fernández (Switzerland) Martina Hingis
- Runners-up: (United States) Lindsay Davenport (Czech Republic) Jana Novotná
- Score: 7–5, 4–6, 6–1

Details
- Draw: 28
- Seeds: 8

Events
Singles	Doubles
← 1996 ·	Family Circle Cup	· 1998 →

Jana Novotná and Arantxa Sánchez Vicario were the defending champions but only Novotná competed that year with Lindsay Davenport.

Davenport and Novotná lost in the final 7–5, 4–6, 6–1 against Mary Joe Fernández and Martina Hingis.

== Seeds ==
Champion seeds are indicated in bold text while text in italics indicates the round in which those seeds were eliminated. The top four seeded teams received byes into the second round.

1. (United States) Lindsay Davenport / (Czech Republic) Jana Novotná (final)
2. (United States) **Mary Joe Fernández** / (Switzerland) **Martina Hingis (champions)**
3. (United States) Gigi Fernández / (United States) Lisa Raymond (semifinals)
4. (United States) Nicole Arendt / (Netherlands) Manon Bollegraf (semifinals)
5. (Latvia) Larisa Savchenko / (Romania) Irina Spîrlea (second round)
6. (Netherlands) Brenda Schultz-McCarthy / (Netherlands) Caroline Vis (second round)
7. (United States) Lori McNeil / (United States) Linda Wild (quarterfinals)
8. (Spain) Conchita Martínez / (Argentina) Patricia Tarabini (quarterfinals)

== Draw ==
=== Key ===
- Q = Qualifier
- WC = Wild card
- LL = Lucky loser
- Alt = Alternate
- ITF = ITF entry
- PR = Protected ranking
- SR = Special ranking
- SE = Special exempt
- JE = Junior exempt
- JR = Junior Accelerator Programme entrant
- CO = College Accelerator Programme entrant
- NG = Next Gen Accelerator Program entrant
- w/o = Walkover
- r = Retired
- d = Defaulted

=== Finals ===
Final
1	(United States) Lindsay Davenport (Czech Republic) Jana Novotná	5	**6**	1
2	(United States) **Mary Joe Fernández** (Switzerland) **Martina Hingis**	**7**	4	**6**

=== Top half ===
First round
LL	(Switzerland) E Gagliardi (Czech Republic) S Kleinová	0	3
(Russia) **E Likhovtseva** (Japan) **A Sugiyama**	**6**	**6**
(Italy) S Farina (Austria) B Schett	1	3
(Poland) **M Grzybowska** (Chinese Taipei) **S-T Wang**	**6**	**6**
(Spain) V Ruano-Pascual (Argentina) P Suárez	3	**6**	4
8	(Spain) **C Martínez** (Argentina) **P Tarabini**	**6**	4	**6**
(United States) A Grossman (Slovakia) K Habšudová	**6**	2	3
(Ukraine) **O Lugina** (United Kingdom) **C Wood**	4	**6**	**6**
(South Africa) A Coetzer (Argentina) I Gorrochategui	**6**	2	2
(Romania) **R Dragomir** (Croatia) **I Majoli**	2	**6**	**6**
(Argentina) F Labat (Germany) B Rittner	4	**6**	4
6	(Netherlands) **B Schultz-McCarthy** (Netherlands) **C Vis**	**6**	2	**6**

Second round
1	(United States) **L Davenport** (Czech Republic) **J Novotná**	**6**	**6**
(Russia) E Likhovtseva (Japan) A Sugiyama	2	0
(Poland) M Grzybowska (Chinese Taipei) S-T Wang	**7**	3	5
8	(Spain) **C Martínez** (Argentina) **P Tarabini**	5	**6**	**7**
4	(United States) **N Arendt** (Netherlands) **M Bollegraf**	**6**	**6**
(Ukraine) O Lugina (United Kingdom) C Wood	2	2
(Romania) **R Dragomir** (Croatia) **I Majoli**	**6**	5	**6**
6	(Netherlands) B Schultz-McCarthy (Netherlands) C Vis	1	**7**	3

Quarterfinals
1	(United States) **L Davenport** (Czech Republic) **J Novotná**	**6**	4	**6**
8	(Spain) C Martínez (Argentina) P Tarabini	0	**6**	2
4	(United States) **N Arendt** (Netherlands) **M Bollegraf**	**7**	**6**
(Romania) R Dragomir (Croatia) I Majoli	6	2

Semifinals
1	(United States) **L Davenport** (Czech Republic) **J Novotná**	**6**	4	**6**
4	(United States) N Arendt (Netherlands) M Bollegraf	4	**6**	3

=== Bottom half ===
First round
5	(Latvia) **L Savchenko** (Romania) **I Spîrlea**	**6**	**6**
WC	(South Africa) J Kruger (Greece) C Papadáki	3	3
(Canada) P Hy-Boulais (Canada) R Simpson	5	**7**	4
(France) **A Fusai** (Argentina) **M Paz**	**7**	5	**6**
(United States) K Adams (South Africa) M de Swardt	4	2
(Germany) **A Huber** (United States) **M Seles**	**6**	**6**
7	(United States) **L McNeil** (United States) **L Wild**	**6**	**6**
(Czech Republic) E Martincová (Slovakia) H Nagyová	2	4
(Germany) S Meier (France) S Pitkowski	4	0
(United States) **C Morariu** (United States) **T Whitlinger-Jones**	**6**	**6**
Q	(Austria) **K Kschwendt** (Croatia) **M Murić**	**6**	**7**
(United States) A Lettiere (Japan) N Miyagi	0	6

Second round
5	(Latvia) L Savchenko (Romania) I Spîrlea
(France) **A Fusai** (Argentina) **M Paz**	**w/o**
(Germany) A Huber (United States) M Seles	3	5
3	(United States) **G Fernández** (United States) **L Raymond**	**6**	**7**
7	(United States) **L McNeil** (United States) **L Wild**	**6**	4	**6**
(United States) C Morariu (United States) T Whitlinger-Jones	2	**6**	3
Q	(Austria) K Kschwendt (Croatia) M Murić	6	3
2	(United States) **M J Fernández** (Switzerland) **M Hingis**	**7**	**6**

Quarterfinals
(France) A Fusai (Argentina) M Paz	4	4
3	(United States) **G Fernández** (United States) **L Raymond**	**6**	**6**
7	(United States) L McNeil (United States) L Wild	0	4
2	(United States) **M J Fernández** (Switzerland) **M Hingis**	**6**	**6**

Semifinals
3	(United States) G Fernández (United States) L Raymond	4	4
2	(United States) **M J Fernández** (Switzerland) **M Hingis**	**6**	**6**
