= 1996 Budapest Lotto Open – Doubles =

Doubles
- 1996 Budapest Lotto Open

Final
- Champions: (United States) Katrina Adams; (United States) Debbie Graham
- Runners-up: (Czech Republic) Radka Bobková; (Czech Republic) Eva Melicharová
- Score: 6–3, 7–6

Details
- Draw: 16
- Seeds: 4

Events
Singles	Doubles
Budapest Lotto Open	· 1997 →

Katrina Adams and Debbie Graham won in the final 6–3, 7–6 against Radka Bobková and Eva Melicharová.

== Seeds ==
Champion seeds are indicated in bold text while text in italics indicates the round in which those seeds were eliminated.

1. (United States) **Katrina Adams** / (United States) **Debbie Graham (champions)**
2. (Austria) Petra Schwarz / (Slovakia) Katarína Studeníková (first round)
3. (Finland) Nanne Dahlman / (United Kingdom) Clare Wood (quarterfinals)
4. (Russia) Anna Kournikova / (Czech Republic) Petra Langrová (quarterfinals)

== Draw ==
=== Key ===
- Q = Qualifier
- WC = Wild card
- LL = Lucky loser
- Alt = Alternate
- ITF = ITF entry
- PR = Protected ranking
- SR = Special ranking
- SE = Special exempt
- JE = Junior exempt
- JR = Junior Accelerator Programme entrant
- CO = College Accelerator Programme entrant
- NG = Next Gen Accelerator Program entrant
- w/o = Walkover
- r = Retired
- d = Defaulted

First round

Quarterfinals

Semifinals

Final

1
- (United States) **K Adams**
- (United States) **D Graham**
**6**
**6**

- (Slovakia) D Krajčovičová
- (Czech Republic) L Němečková
1
1

1
- (United States) **K Adams**
- (United States) **D Graham**
**6**
**6**

- (Ukraine) E Brioukhovets
- (Ukraine) E Tatarkova
1
3

- (Japan) N Kijimuta
- (Japan) Y Yoshida
4
0

- (Japan) **N Kijimuta**
- (Japan) **Y Yoshida**
**6**
**6**

1
- (United States) **K Adams**
- (United States) **D Graham**
**6**
4
**6**

4
- (Russia) **A Kournikova**
- (Czech Republic) **P Langrová**
**6**
**6**

- (Ukraine) O Lugina
- (Bulgaria) E Pampoulova
4
**6**
2

- (Czech Republic) E Martincová
- (Poland) M Mróz
4
0

4
- (Russia) A Kournikova
- (Czech Republic) P Langrová
4
**6**
2

WC
- (South Africa) L Horn
- (Hungary) R Vidáts
1
4

- (Ukraine) **O Lugina**
- (Bulgaria) **E Pampoulova**
**6**
3
**6**

- (Ukraine) **O Lugina**
- (Bulgaria) **E Pampoulova**
**6**
**6**

1
- (United States) **Katrina Adams**
- (United States) **Debbie Graham**
**6**
**7**

- (United States) L Poruri
- (United States) T Whitlinger-Jones
**6**
2
2

- (Czech Republic) Radka Bobková
- (Czech Republic) Eva Melicharová
3
6

- (Czech Republic) **R Bobková**
- (Czech Republic) **E Melicharová**
4
**6**
**6**

- (Czech Republic) **R Bobková**
- (Czech Republic) **E Melicharová**
**6**
**6**

- (Austria) M Schnell
- (Austria) B Schwartz
3
4

3
- (Finland) N Dahlman
- (United Kingdom) C Wood
3
1

3
- (Finland) **N Dahlman**
- (United Kingdom) **C Wood**
**6**
**6**

- (Czech Republic) **R Bobková**
- (Czech Republic) **E Melicharová**
**6**
**7**

- (Romania) C Cristea
- (Hungary) V Csurgo
**6**
1
3

- (Romania) R Dragomir
- (United States) A Grossman
4
5

- (United States) **E deLone**
- (Australia) **N Pratt**
4
**6**
**6**

- (United States) E deLone
- (Australia) N Pratt
3
1

- (Romania) **R Dragomir**
- (United States) **A Grossman**
4
**6**
**7**

- (Romania) **R Dragomir**
- (United States) **A Grossman**
**6**
**6**

2
- (Austria) P Schwarz
- (Slovakia) K Studeníková
**6**
3
5
