= 1998 Family Circle Cup – Doubles =

Doubles
- 1998 Family Circle Cup

Final
- Champions: (Spain) Conchita Martínez (Argentina) Patricia Tarabini
- Runners-up: (United States) Lisa Raymond (Australia) Rennae Stubbs
- Score: 3–6, 6–4, 6–4

Details
- Draw: 28
- Seeds: 8

Events
| Singles | Doubles |
| ← 1997 · | Family Circle Cup | · 1999 → |

Mary Joe Fernández and Martina Hingis were the defending champions but did not compete that year.

Conchita Martínez and Patricia Tarabini won in the final 3–6, 6–4, 6–4 against Lisa Raymond and Rennae Stubbs.

== Seeds ==
Champion seeds are indicated in bold text while text in italics indicates the round in which those seeds were eliminated. The top four seeded teams received byes into the second round.

1. (United States) Lindsay Davenport / (Belarus) Natasha Zvereva (quarterfinals)
2. (Latvia) Larisa Neiland / (Czech Republic) Jana Novotná (semifinals)
3. (France) Alexandra Fusai / (France) Nathalie Tauziat (quarterfinals)
4. (Indonesia) Yayuk Basuki / (Netherlands) Caroline Vis (second round)
5. (United States) Katrina Adams / (Netherlands) Manon Bollegraf (semifinals)
6. (Spain) **Conchita Martínez** / (Argentina) **Patricia Tarabini (champions)**
7. (United States) Lisa Raymond / (Australia) Rennae Stubbs (final)
8. (Russia) Elena Likhovtseva / (Japan) Ai Sugiyama (first round)

== Draw ==
=== Key ===
- Q = Qualifier
- WC = Wild card
- LL = Lucky loser
- Alt = Alternate
- SE = Special exempt
- PR = Protected ranking
- ITF = ITF entry
- JE = Junior exempt
- w/o = Walkover
- r = Retired
- d = Defaulted
- SR = Special ranking

=== Final ===
Final

7
- (United States) Lisa Raymond
- (Australia) Rennae Stubbs
**6**
4
4

6
- (Spain) **Conchita Martínez**
- (Argentina) **Patricia Tarabini**
3
**6**
**6**

=== Top half ===
First round

Second round

Quarterfinals

Semifinals

1
- (United States) **L Davenport**
- (Belarus) **N Zvereva**
**6**
**6**

Q
- (Poland) **M Grzybowska**
- (France) **A-G Sidot**
**6**
**6**

Q
- (Poland) M Grzybowska
- (France) A-G Sidot
0
1

- (United States) E deLone
- (Australia) N Pratt
2
3

1
- (United States) L Davenport
- (Belarus) N Zvereva
1
4

- (Argentina) **M Paz**
- (Thailand) **T Tanasugarn**
**6**
**6**

7
- (United States) **L Raymond**
- (Australia) **R Stubbs**
**6**
**6**

WC
- (United States) J Capriati
- (Italy) S Cecchini
1
2

- (Argentina) M Paz
- (Thailand) T Tanasugarn
**7**
0
3

- (Switzerland) P Schnyder
- (Netherlands) B Schultz-McCarthy
2
1

7
- (United States) **L Raymond**
- (Australia) **R Stubbs**
5
**6**
**6**

7
- (United States) **L Raymond**
- (Australia) **R Stubbs**
**6**
**6**

7
- (United States) **L Raymond**
- (Australia) **R Stubbs**
**7**
**7**

5
- (United States) K Adams
- (Netherlands) M Bollegraf
5
5

3
- (France) **A Fusai**
- (France) **N Tauziat**
**6**
**6**

- (South Africa) **M de Swardt**
- (United States) **D Graham**
**7**
**6**

- (South Africa) M de Swardt
- (United States) D Graham
1
4

- (Italy) R Grande
- (Romania) I Spîrlea
6
1

3
- (France) A Fusai
- (France) N Tauziat
2
4

- (Spain) **V Ruano Pascual**
- (Argentina) **P Suárez**
**6**
5
**6**

5
- (United States) **K Adams**
- (Netherlands) **M Bollegraf**
**6**
**6**

- (Sweden) Å Carlsson
- (Argentina) F Labat
3
**7**
1

- (Spain) V Ruano Pascual
- (Argentina) P Suárez
3
**6**
4

- (Canada) P Hy-Boulais
- (Chinese Taipei) S-T Wang
2
6

5
- (United States) **K Adams**
- (Netherlands) **M Bollegraf**
**6**
2
**6**

5
- (United States) **K Adams**
- (Netherlands) **M Bollegraf**
**6**
**7**

=== Bottom half ===
First round

Second round

Quarterfinals

Semifinals

6
- (Spain) **C Martínez**
- (Argentina) **P Tarabini**
**7**
**6**

- (Australia) L Pleming
- (United States) A Wunderlich
6
3

6
- (Spain) **C Martínez**
- (Argentina) **P Tarabini**
**6**
**6**

- (Germany) **M Babel**
- (Germany) **W Probst**
**7**
**6**

- (Germany) M Babel
- (Germany) W Probst
1
3

- (Romania) R Dragomir
- (Croatia) I Majoli
6
1

6
- (Spain) **C Martínez**
- (Argentina) **P Tarabini**
**6**
**6**

WC
- (United States) **L McNeil**
- (United States) **M Washington**
**6**
3
**6**

WC
- (United States) L McNeil
- (United States) M Washington
4
4

- (Italy) S Farina
- (Austria) B Schett
4
**6**
4

WC
- (United States) **L McNeil**
- (United States) **M Washington**
**7**
**6**

4
- (Indonesia) Y Basuki
- (Netherlands) C Vis
5
3

6
- (Spain) **C Martínez**
- (Argentina) **P Tarabini**
**7**
**6**

8
- (Russia) E Likhovtseva
- (Japan) A Sugiyama
4
**6**
4

2
- (Latvia) L Neiland
- (Czech Republic) J Novotná
6
4

- (Ukraine) **O Lugina**
- (Argentina) **L Montalvo**
**6**
2
**6**

- (Ukraine) **O Lugina**
- (Argentina) **L Montalvo**
**w/o**

- (United States) C Rubin
- (France) S Testud
2
2

- (France) M Pierce
- (Spain) A Sánchez-Vicario

- (France) **M Pierce**
- (Spain) **A Sánchez-Vicario**
**6**
**6**

- (Ukraine) O Lugina
- (Argentina) L Montalvo
1
2

- (France) A Dechaume-Balleret
- (Germany) B Rittner
6
5

2
- (Latvia) **L Neiland**
- (Czech Republic) **J Novotná**
**6**
**6**

- (Romania) **C Cristea**
- (United States) **C Morariu**
**7**
**7**

- (Romania) C Cristea
- (United States) C Morariu
4
**6**
1

2
- (Latvia) **L Neiland**
- (Czech Republic) **J Novotná**
**6**
4
**6**
