= 1996 Budapest Lotto Open =

- Date: 6–12 May
- Edition: 1st
- Category: Tier IV
- Draw: 32S / 16D
- Prize money: $107,500
- Surface: Clay / outdoor
- Location: Budapest, Hungary

Champions

Singles
- (Romania) Ruxandra Dragomir

Doubles
- (United States) Katrina Adams / (United States) Debbie Graham
Budapest Lotto Open	· 1997 →

The 1996 Budapest Lotto Open was a women's tennis tournament played on outdoor clay courts in Budapest in Hungary that was part of the Tier IV category of the 1996 WTA Tour. It was the inaugural edition of the tournament and was held from 6 May until 12 May 1996. Sixth-seeded Ruxandra Dragomir won the singles title.

== Finals ==
=== Singles ===
(Romania) Ruxandra Dragomir defeated (Austria) Melanie Schnell 7–6^{(8–6)}, 6–1

- It was Dragomir's first singles title of her career.

=== Doubles ===
(United States) Katrina Adams / (United States) Debbie Graham defeated (Czech Republic) Radka Bobková / (Czech Republic) Eva Melicharová 6–3, 7–6^{(7–3)}

- It was Adams' 1st doubles title of the year and the 18th of her career. It was Graham's 1st doubles title of the year and the 3rd of her career.
