= 1999 Family Circle Cup – Doubles =

Doubles
- 1999 Family Circle Cup

Final
- Champions: (Russia) Elena Likhovtseva (Czech Republic) Jana Novotná
- Runners-up: (Austria) Barbara Schett (Switzerland) Patty Schnyder
- Score: 6–1, 6–4

Details
- Draw: 28
- Seeds: 8

Events
Singles	Doubles
← 1998 ·	Family Circle Cup	· 2000 →

The 1999 Family Circle Cup doubles was the doubles event of the twenty-seventh edition of the tennis tournament played at Hilton Head, United States. It is the third WTA Tier I tournament of the year, and part of the US Spring tennis season. Conchita Martínez and Patricia Tarabini were the defending champions but lost in the second round to Silvia Farina and Corina Morariu.

Elena Likhovtseva and Jana Novotná won in the final 6–1, 6–4 against Barbara Schett and Patty Schnyder.

== Seeds ==
The top four seeded teams received byes into the second round.

1. (United States) Lindsay Davenport / (Belarus) Natasha Zvereva (semifinals)
2. (Russia) Elena Likhovtseva / (Czech Republic) Jana Novotná (champions)
3. (United States) Lisa Raymond / (Australia) Rennae Stubbs (quarterfinals)
4. (Latvia) Larisa Neiland / (Spain) Arantxa Sánchez Vicario (second round)
5. (South Africa) Mariaan de Swardt / (Ukraine) Elena Tatarkova (first round)
6. (Spain) Conchita Martínez / (Argentina) Patricia Tarabini (second round)
7. (Romania) Irina Spîrlea / (Netherlands) Caroline Vis (first round)
8. (South Africa) Amanda Coetzer / (Russia) Anna Kournikova (quarterfinals)

== Draw ==
=== Key ===
- Q = Qualifier
- WC = Wild card
- LL = Lucky loser
- Alt = Alternate
- SE = Special exempt
- PR = Protected ranking
- ITF = ITF entry
- JE = Junior exempt
- w/o = Walkover
- r = Retired
- d = Defaulted
- SR = Special ranking

=== Finals ===
Semifinals

Final

1
- (United States) Lindsay Davenport
- (Belarus) Natasha Zvereva
7
6^{5}
2

- (Austria) Barbara Schett
- (Switzerland) Patty Schnyder
5
7^{7}
6

- (Austria) Barbara Schett
- (Switzerland) Patty Schnyder
1
4

2
- (Russia) Elena Likhovtseva
- (Czech Republic) Jana Novotná
6
6

- (France) Alexandra Fusai
- (France) Anne-Gaëlle Sidot
3
6
2

2
- (Russia) Elena Likhovtseva
- (Czech Republic) Jana Novotná
6
1
6

=== Top half ===
First round

Second round

Quarterfinals

Semifinals

1
- (United States) L Davenport
- (Belarus) N Zvereva
4
6
6

- (Romania) C Cristea
- (Romania) R Dragomir
0
3

- (Spain) V Ruano Pascual
- (Argentina) P Suárez
6
2
4

- (Spain) V Ruano Pascual
- (Argentina) P Suárez
6
6

1
- (United States) L Davenport
- (Belarus) N Zvereva
6
7^{7}

- (Belarus) O Barabanschikova
- (Germany) B Rittner
5
6
6^{3}

8
- (South Africa) A Coetzer
- (Russia) A Kournikova
4
6^{2}

- (United States) K Adams
- (United States) L McNeil
7
2
7^{7}

- (United States) K Adams
- (United States) L McNeil
2
5

- (France) A Dechaume-Balleret
- (France) A Mauresmo
2
1

8
- (South Africa) A Coetzer
- (Russia) A Kournikova
6
7

8
- (South Africa) A Coetzer
- (Russia) A Kournikova
6
6

1
- (United States) L Davenport
- (Belarus) N Zvereva
7
6^{5}
2

- (Austria) B Schett
- (Switzerland) P Schnyder
5
7^{7}
6

4
- (Latvia) L Neiland
- (Spain) A Sánchez Vicario
3
6
3

- (Italy) R Grande
- (United States) M Seles
6
7

- (Italy) R Grande
- (United States) M Seles
6
3
6

- (Czech Republic) E Melicharová
- (United States) M Washington
2
5

- (Italy) R Grande
- (United States) M Seles
4
6
2

- (Austria) B Schett
- (Switzerland) P Schnyder
6
3
7^{9}

- (Austria) B Schett
- (Switzerland) P Schnyder
6
3
6

- (Argentina) I Gorrochategui
- (Argentina) L Montalvo
2
6
6^{7}

- (Austria) B Schett
- (Switzerland) P Schnyder
6^{4}
6
6

- (Zimbabwe) C Black
- (Kazakhstan) I Selyutina
6
7^{10}

- (Zimbabwe) C Black
- (Kazakhstan) I Selyutina
7^{7}
0
4

5
- (South Africa) M de Swardt
- (Ukraine) E Tatarkova
0
6^{8}

=== Bottom half ===
First round

Second round

Quarterfinals

Semifinals

7
- (Romania) I Spîrlea
- (Netherlands) C Vis
7
4
3

- (France) A Fusai
- (France) A-G Sidot
5
6
6

- (France) A Fusai
- (France) A-G Sidot
7^{7}
6

- (United States) S Cacic
- (Croatia) I Majoli
6^{5}
3

- (Slovenia) T Križan
- (South Africa) J Steck
6^{2}
2

- (Slovenia) T Križan
- (South Africa) J Steck
7^{7}
6

- (France) A Fusai
- (France) A-G Sidot
6
6

- (United States) N Arendt
- (Netherlands) M Bollegraf
6
7

3
- (United States) L Raymond
- (Australia) R Stubbs
2
4

- (Czech Republic) K Hrdličková
- (Czech Republic) H Vildová
2
5

- (United States) N Arendt
- (Netherlands) M Bollegraf
5
3

3
- (United States) L Raymond
- (Australia) R Stubbs
7
6

- (France) A Fusai
- (France) A-G Sidot
3
6
2

6
- (Spain) C Martínez
- (Argentina) P Tarabini
6
6

2
- (Russia) E Likhovtseva
- (Czech Republic) J Novotná
6
1
6

- (Croatia) M Murić
- (Greece) C Papadáki
2
4

6
- (Spain) C Martínez
- (Argentina) P Tarabini
2
5

- (Australia) N Pratt
- (United States) K Schlukebir
7
4
6^{8}

- (Italy) S Farina
- (United States) C Morariu
6
7

- (Italy) S Farina
- (United States) C Morariu
5
6
7^{10}

- (Italy) S Farina
- (United States) C Morariu
2
2

- (Australia) K Kunce
- (United States) K Po
2
4

2
- (Russia) E Likhovtseva
- (Czech Republic) J Novotná
6
6

Q
- (Poland) A Olsza
- (United States) L Osterloh
6
6

Q
- (Poland) A Olsza
- (United States) L Osterloh
1
1

2
- (Russia) E Likhovtseva
- (Czech Republic) J Novotná
6
6
