= 1997 Budapest Lotto Open – Doubles =

Doubles
- 1997 Budapest Lotto Open

Final
- Champions: (South Africa) Amanda Coetzer (France) Alexandra Fusai
- Runners-up: (Czech Republic) Eva Martincová (Germany) Elena Wagner
- Score: 6–3, 6–1

Details
- Draw: 16
- Seeds: 4

Events
Singles	Doubles
← 1996 ·	Budapest Lotto Open	· 1998 →

Katrina Adams and Debbie Graham were the defending champions but did not compete that year.

Amanda Coetzer and Alexandra Fusai won in the final 6–3, 6–1 against Eva Martincová and Elena Wagner.

== Seeds ==
Champion seeds are indicated in bold text while text in italics indicates the round in which those seeds were eliminated.

1. (South Africa) **Amanda Coetzer** / (France) **Alexandra Fusai (champions)**
2. (South Africa) Mariaan de Swardt / (Romania) Ruxandra Dragomir (semifinals)
3. (Czech Republic) Eva Martincová / (Germany) Elena Wagner (final)
4. (Australia) Rachel McQuillan / (Germany) Silke Meier (quarterfinals)

== Draw ==
=== Key ===
- Q = Qualifier
- WC = Wild card
- LL = Lucky loser
- Alt = Alternate
- ITF = ITF entry
- PR = Protected ranking
- SR = Special ranking
- SE = Special exempt
- JE = Junior exempt
- JR = Junior Accelerator Programme entrant
- CO = College Accelerator Programme entrant
- NG = Next Gen Accelerator Program entrant
- w/o = Walkover
- r = Retired
- d = Defaulted

First round
1	(South Africa) **A Coetzer** (France) **A Fusai**	**6**	**6**
(Romania) C Cristea (Germany) C Schneider	1	4
(Hungary) **V Csurgo** (Argentina) **P Suárez**	**6**	**6**
(Germany) Adriana Barna (Germany) Anca Barna	2	2
4	(Australia) **R McQuillan** (Germany) **S Meier**	**6**	**6**
WC	(Hungary) Z Gubacsi (Hungary) P Mandula	3	3
(Czech Republic) **P Langrová** (Slovakia) **R Zrubáková**	**6**	**6**
(Argentina) B Fulco-Villella (Bulgaria) S Krivencheva	2	2
(Argentina) L Montalvo (Slovakia) H Nagyová	**6**	6	5
(Czech Republic) **E Melicharová** (Czech Republic) **H Vildová**	2	**7**	**7**
(Austria) S Dopfer (Germany) V Martinek	1	2
3	(Czech Republic) **E Martincová** (Germany) **E Wagner**	**6**	**6**
(Czech Republic) R Bobková (Slovakia) K Studeníková	1	5
(Austria) **K Kschwendt** (United Kingdom) **C Wood**	**6**	**7**
(Sweden) Å Carlsson (Hungary) A Temesvári	**6**	1	5
2	(South Africa) **M de Swardt** (Romania) **R Dragomir**	2	**6**	**7**

Quarterfinals
1	(South Africa) **A Coetzer** (France) **A Fusai**	**6**	4	**6**
(Hungary) V Csurgo (Argentina) P Suárez	4	**6**	4
4	(Australia) R McQuillan (Germany) S Meier	3	6
(Czech Republic) **P Langrová** (Slovakia) **R Zrubáková**	**6**	**7**
(Czech Republic) E Melicharová (Czech Republic) H Vildová	6	4
3	(Czech Republic) **E Martincová** (Germany) **E Wagner**	**7**	**6**
(Austria) K Kschwendt (United Kingdom) C Wood	4	4
2	(South Africa) **M de Swardt** (Romania) **R Dragomir**	**6**	**6**

Semifinals
1	(South Africa) **A Coetzer** (France) **A Fusai**	**7**	2	**6**
(Czech Republic) P Langrová (Slovakia) R Zrubáková	5	**6**	3
3	(Czech Republic) **E Martincová** (Germany) **E Wagner**	**6**	**6**
2	(South Africa) M de Swardt (Romania) R Dragomir	4	1

Final
1	(South Africa) **Amanda Coetzer** (France) **Alexandra Fusai**	**6**	**6**
3	(Czech Republic) Eva Martincová (Germany) Elena Wagner	3	1
