= 1997 Family Circle Cup =

- Date: March 31 – April 6
- Edition: 25th
- Category: Tier I
- Draw: 56S / 28D
- Prize money: $926,250
- Surface: Clay / outdoor
- Location: Hilton Head Island, SC, US
- Venue: Sea Pines Plantation
- Attendance: 85,574

Champions

Singles
- (Switzerland) Martina Hingis

Doubles
- (United States) Mary Joe Fernández / (Switzerland) Martina Hingis
← 1996 ·	Family Circle Cup	· 1998 →

The 1997 Family Circle Cup was a women's tennis tournament played on outdoor clay courts at the Sea Pines Plantation on Hilton Head Island, South Carolina in the United States that was part of Tier I of the 1997 WTA Tour. It was the 25th edition of the tournament and was held from March 31 through April 6, 1997. First-seeded Martina Hingis won the singles title.

== Finals ==
=== Singles ===
(Switzerland) Martina Hingis defeated (United States) Monica Seles 3–6, 6–3, 7–6^{(7–5)}

- It was Hingis' 6th singles title of the year and the 8th of her career.

=== Doubles ===
(United States) Mary Joe Fernández / (Switzerland) Martina Hingis defeated (United States) Lindsay Davenport / (Czech Republic) Jana Novotná 7–5, 4–6, 6–1

- It was Fernández's 1st doubles title of the year and the 16th of her career. It was Hingis' 1st doubles title of the year and the 2nd of her career.
