= 1999 Family Circle Cup =

- Date: March 29 – April 4
- Edition: 27th
- Category: Tier I
- Draw: 56S / 28D
- Prize money: $1,000,000
- Surface: Clay / outdoor
- Location: Hilton Head Island, SC, US
- Venue: Sea Pines Plantation
- Attendance: 102,743

Champions

Singles
- (Switzerland) Martina Hingis

Doubles
- (Russia) Elena Likhovtseva / (Czech Republic) Jana Novotná
| ← 1998 · | Family Circle Cup | · 2000 → |

The 1999 Family Circle Cup was a women's tennis tournament played on outdoor clay courts at the Sea Pines Plantation on Hilton Head Island, South Carolina in the United States that was part of Tier I of the 1999 WTA Tour. It was the 27th edition of the tournament and was held from March 29 through April 4, 1999. First-seeded Martina Hingis won the singles title.

== Finals ==
=== Singles ===
(Switzerland) Martina Hingis defeated (Russia) Anna Kournikova, 6–4, 6–3

- It was Hingis' 6th title of the year and the 45th of her career.

=== Doubles ===
(Russia) Elena Likhovtseva / (Czech Republic) Jana Novotná defeated (Austria) Barbara Schett / (Switzerland) Patty Schnyder, 6–1, 6–4

== Entrants ==
=== Seeds ===
| Country | Player | Rank | Seed |
|---|---|---|---|
| SUI | Martina Hingis | 1 | 1 |
| USA | Monica Seles | 3 | 2 |
| CZE | Jana Novotná | 4 | 3 |
| ESP | Arantxa Sánchez Vicario | 7 | 4 |
| RSA | Amanda Coetzer | 9 | 5 |
| SUI | Patty Schnyder | 13 | 6 |
| RUS | Anna Kournikova | 20 | 7 |
| FRA | Amélie Mauresmo | 14 | 8 |
| ROU | Irina Spîrlea | 15 | 9 |
| ESP | Conchita Martínez | 18 | 10 |
| BLR | Natasha Zvereva | 17 | 11 |
| AUT | Barbara Schett | 19 | 12 |
| ITA | Silvia Farina | 25 | 13 |
| RUS | Elena Likhovtseva | 22 | 14 |
| ESP | Magüi Serna | 24 | 15 |
| SVK | Henrieta Nagyová | 26 | 16 |

=== Other entrants ===
The following players received wildcards into the singles main draw:

- (United States) Meghann Shaughnessy
- (United States) Brie Rippner
- (Belarus) Olga Barabanschikova

The following players received entry from the singles qualifying draw:

- (Argentina) Paola Suárez
- (Czech Republic) Adriana Gerši
- (United States) Alexandra Stevenson
- (Russia) Elena Makarova
- (Russia) Tatiana Panova
- (United States) Lilia Osterloh
- (United States) Sandra Cacic
- (Switzerland) Emmanuelle Gagliardi

The following players received entry as a lucky loser:

- (Latvia) Larisa Neiland

The following players received entry from the doubles qualifying draw:

- (Poland) Aleksandra Olsza / (United States) Lilia Osterloh
