= 1997 Budapest Lotto Open =

- Date: 22–27 April
- Edition: 2nd
- Category: Tier IV
- Draw: 32S / 16D
- Prize money: $107,500
- Surface: Clay / outdoor
- Location: Budapest, Hungary

Champions

Singles
- (South Africa) Amanda Coetzer

Doubles
- (South Africa) Amanda Coetzer / (France) Alexandra Fusai
- Budapest Lotto Open

The 1997 Budapest Lotto Open was a women's tennis tournament played on outdoor clay courts in Budapest in Hungary that was part of Tier IV of the 1997 WTA Tour. It was the second edition of the tournament and was held from 22 April through 27 April 1997. Second-seeded Amanda Coetzer won the singles title.

== Finals ==
=== Singles ===
(South Africa) Amanda Coetzer defeated (Belgium) Sabine Appelmans 6–1, 6–3

- It was Coetzer's 1st singles title of the year and the 4th of her career.

=== Doubles ===
(South Africa) Amanda Coetzer / (France) Alexandra Fusai defeated (Czech Republic) Eva Martincová / (Germany) Elena Wagner 6–3, 6–1

- It was Coetzer's only doubles title of the year and the 7th of her career. It was Fusai's 2nd doubles title of the year and the 3rd of her career.
