= 1998 Family Circle Cup =

- Date: March 30 – April 5
- Edition: 26th
- Category: Tier I
- Surface: Clay / Outdoor
- Location: Hilton Head Island, SC, USA
- Venue: Sea Pines Plantation
- Attendance: 70,232

Champions

Singles
- (South Africa) Amanda Coetzer

Doubles
- (Spain) Conchita Martínez / (Argentina) Patricia Tarabini
← 1997 ·	Family Circle Cup	· 1999 →

The 1998 Family Circle Cup was a women's tennis tournament played on outdoor clay courts at the Sea Pines Plantation on Hilton Head Island, South Carolina in the United States that was part of Tier I of the 1998 WTA Tour. It was the 28th edition of the tournament and was held from March 30 through April 5, 1998.

== Finals ==
=== Singles ===
(South Africa) Amanda Coetzer defeated (Romania) Irina Spîrlea 6–3, 6–4

- It was Coetzer's only title of the year and the 13th of her career.

=== Doubles ===
(Spain) Conchita Martínez / (Argentina) Patricia Tarabini defeated (United States) Lisa Raymond / (Australia) Rennae Stubbs 3–6, 6–4, 6–4

- It was Martínez's 1st title of the year and the 34th of her career. It was Tarabini's only title of the year and the 12th of her career.
