= Melanie Schnell =

Austrian tennis player

- Country (sports): Austria
- Born: 22 February 1977 (age 48) Radstadt, Austria
- Plays: Right-handed
- Prize money: $157,096

Singles
- Career record: 161–146
- Career titles: 2 ITF
- Highest ranking: No. 90 (10 June 1996)

Grand Slam singles results
- Australian Open: 1R (1996)
- French Open: 1R (1996)
- Wimbledon: 2R (1995)
- US Open: 2R (1995)

Doubles
- Career record: 59–61
- Career titles: 4 ITF
- Highest ranking: No. 153 (18 September 2000)

Grand Slam doubles results
- US Open: 1R (1995)

Melanie Schnell (born 22 February 1977) is a former professional tennis player from Austria.

== Biography ==
Schnell, a right-handed player from Radstadt, began competing on tour in 1993. She made her Grand Slam main-draw debut at the 1995 Wimbledon Championships, where she had a win over Katerina Maleeva. Aged 18, she broke into the world's top 100 in 1995 and had a peak ranking of 90 the following year. Her best performance on the WTA Tour came at the 1996 Budapest Open where she ended runner-up, losing to Ruxandra Dragomir.

She represented the Austria Fed Cup team in one tie, a 1996 World Group playoff against Germany, in which she featured in the dead rubber doubles. Partnering with Barbara Schett, the pair beat Sabine Hack and Christina Singer, to give Austria its only win of the fixture.

Married to tennis player Lars Rehmann, Schnell is now based in Germany. She was previously in a relationship with Italian tennis player Diego Nargiso.

== WTA Tour finals ==
=== Singles: 1 (runner-up) ===
Result	Date	Tournament	Tier	Surface	Opponent	Score
Loss	May 1996	Hungarian Ladies Open, Budapest	Tier IV	Clay	(Romania) Ruxandra Dragomir	6–7^{(6)}, 1–6

== ITF Circuit finals ==
$75,000 tournaments
$25,000 tournaments
$10,000 tournaments

=== Singles (2–2) ===
Result	No.	Date	Tournament	Surface	Opponent	Score
Loss	1.	30 August 1993	Marina di Massa, Italy	Clay	(Spain) Inmaculada Varas	6–7, 2–6
Win	1.	16 November 1997	Le Havre, France	Clay (i)	(Poland) Katarzyna Nowak	6–2, 7–5
Loss	2.	30 November 1997	Mallorca, Spain	Clay	(Spain) Noelia Serra	4–6, 1–6
Win	2.	3 April 2000	Dinan, France	Clay	(Ukraine) Julia Vakulenko	2–6, 6–1, 6–2

=== Doubles (4–4) ===
Result	No.	Date	Location	Surface	Partner	Opponents	Score
Win	1.	Nov 1997	Moulins, France	Hard (i)	(United States) Julie Steven	(Germany) Kirstin Freye (United States) Kelly Pace	6–1, 4–2 ret.
Win	2.	Nov 1997	Le Havre, France	Clay (i)	(United States) Julie Steven	(Hungary) Katalin Marosi (Germany) Caroline Schneider	6–2, 3–6, 7–6^{(3)}
Loss	1.	Nov 1997	Mallorca 3, Spain	Clay	(Hungary) Katalin Marosi	(Spain) Rosa María Andrés Rodríguez (Spain) Marina Escobar	4–6, 2–6
Win	3.	Dec 1997	Mallorca 4, Spain	Clay	(Hungary) Katalin Marosi	(Spain) Marta Cano (Spain) Conchita Martínez Granados	6–4, 4–6, 7–5
Loss	2.	Oct 1998	Batumi, Georgia	Hard	(Netherlands) Amanda Hopmans	(Russia) Evgenia Kulikovskaya (Russia) Ekaterina Sysoeva	4–6, 6–3, 0–6
Loss	3.	Sep 1999	Otočec, Slovenia	Clay	(Germany) Syna Schreiber	(Slovakia) Ľudmila Cervanová (Slovakia) Andrea Šebová	3–6, 4–6
Loss	4.	Jul 2000	Puchheim, Germany	Clay	(Germany) Angelika Bachmann	(Bulgaria) Svetlana Krivencheva (Slovakia) Zuzana Váleková	7–5, 3–6, 7–5
Win	4.	Sep 2000	Bordeaux, France	Clay	(France) Virginie Razzano	(Spain) Lourdes Domínguez Lino (Spain) María Sánchez Lorenzo	2–6, 7–5, 6–3
