= Lisa Raymond =

American tennis player (born 1973)

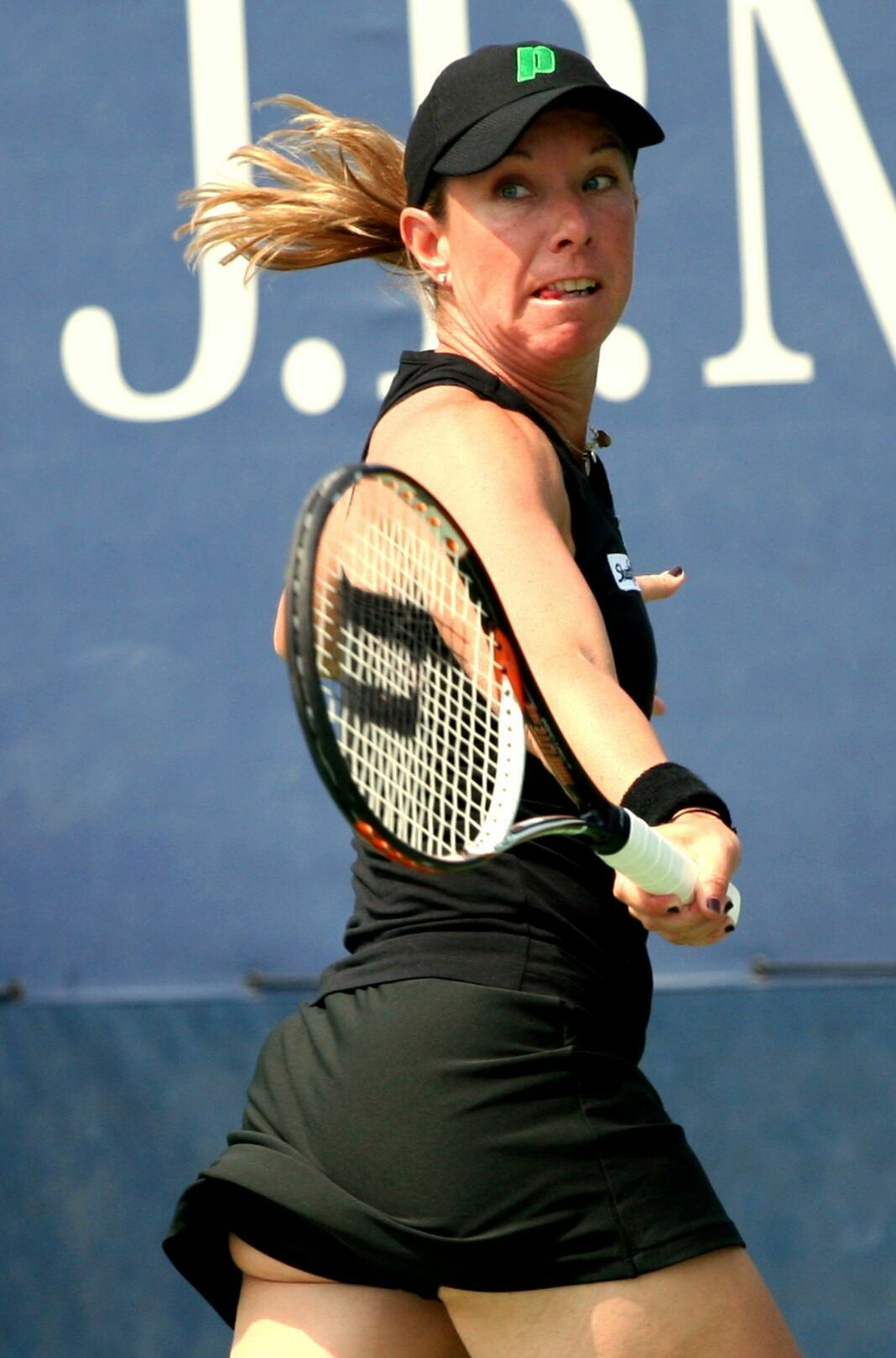
- Raymond at the 2011 US Open
- Country (sports): United States
- Residence: Media, Pennsylvania, U.S.
- Born: August 10, 1973 (age 53) Norristown, Pennsylvania, U.S.
- Height: 5 ft 5 in (1.65 m)
- Turned pro: 1989
- Retired: 2015
- Plays: Right-handed (one-handed backhand)
- College: University of Florida
- Prize money: US$ 10,026,421

Singles
- Career record: 390–299
- Career titles: 4
- Highest ranking: No. 15 (October 20, 1997)

Grand Slam singles results
- Australian Open: QF (2004)
- French Open: 4R (1997)
- Wimbledon: QF (2000)
- US Open: 4R (1996)

Other tournaments
- Olympic Games: 3R (2004)

Doubles
- Career record: 861–347
- Career titles: 79
- Highest ranking: No. 1 (June 12, 2000)

Grand Slam doubles results
- Australian Open: W (2000)
- French Open: W (2006)
- Wimbledon: W (2001)
- US Open: W (2001, 2005, 2011)

Other doubles tournaments
- Tour Finals: W (2001, 2005, 2006, 2011)
- Olympic Games: SF – 4th (2012)

Mixed doubles
- Career titles: 5

Grand Slam mixed doubles results
- Australian Open: SF (1996, 2010)
- French Open: W (2003)
- Wimbledon: W (1999, 2012)
- US Open: W (1996, 2002)
Medal record
Olympic Games
Bronze medal – third place	2012 London	Mixed Doubles

Lisa Raymond (born August 10, 1973) is an American former professional tennis player who has achieved notable success in doubles tennis. Raymond has eleven major titles to her name: six in women's doubles and five in mixed doubles. On June 12, 2000, she reached the world No. 1 ranking in doubles for the first time, becoming the 13th player to reach the milestone. Raymond was ranked No. 1 on five occasions in her career over a combined total of 137 weeks (the fourth-highest mark of all time) and finished as the year-end No. 1 doubles player in both 2001 and 2006. She currently holds the record of most doubles match wins (860) and most doubles matches played (1,206) in WTA history, and earned more than $10 million in prize money in her career.

She is one of the few players to win a 'Career Grand Slam' in doubles, which she accomplished after winning the 2006 French Open title. Among her former doubles partners are Lindsay Davenport, Martina Navratilova, Rennae Stubbs, Samantha Stosur, Květa Peschke, Cara Black and Liezel Huber. Raymond is also an Olympic medalist, having won the bronze medal in the mixed-doubles competition at the 2012 Summer Olympics for the US team, partnering with Mike Bryan. She reached a total of 122 WTA doubles finals and won 79 titles (sixth-most in history); Raymond also won a doubles title every single year between 1993 and 2012, a span of 20 years.

Despite being best known for her doubles prowess, Raymond also achieved moderate success in singles, winning four titles (finishing runner-up on eight other occasions) and reached a career-high of world No. 15 in October 1997. She reached the second week of a Grand Slam eight times, with her best results being two quarterfinal appearances at the 2000 Wimbledon Championships and the 2004 Australian Open, and six fourth round finishes. During her singles career, Raymond recorded wins over former world-number-ones Venus Williams, Arantxa Sánchez Vicario, Monica Seles, Jennifer Capriati and Martina Hingis, as well as other accomplished former top 10 players such as world No. 2 Jana Novotna, Amanda Coetzer, Magdalena Maleeva, Brenda Schultz-McCarthy, Lori McNeil, Zina Garrison, Nathalie Tauziat, Irina Spîrlea, Natasha Zvereva, Conchita Martínez, Marion Bartoli, Svetlana Kuznetsova, Maria Kirilenko, Elena Dementieva, Daniela Hantuchová, and Dinara Safina. In February 2007 she decided to retire from playing singles, instead choosing to focus on her doubles career.

== Career ==
=== Early years ===
Born in Norristown, Pennsylvania, Raymond is a 1991 graduate of The Academy of Notre Dame de Namur, a private Catholic girls school in Villanova, Pennsylvania. She received an athletic scholarship to attend the University of Florida in Gainesville, Florida, where she played for coach Andy Brandi's Florida Gators women's tennis team. As a Gator, she won the NCAA singles title in 1992 and 1993 and led the Gators to their first NCAA national team championship in 1992. She was the first player to win all three collegiate Grand Slam titles in a single season (1992). She received the 1992 Rookie of the Year award, the 1992 Tennis Magazine Collegiate Player of the Year award, and twice received the Honda Sports Award for Tennis, recognizing her as the outstanding collegiate female tennis player of the year in 1991/92 and in 1992/93.

As a junior, Raymond won five U.S. National (USTA) singles and doubles titles, and she was ranked No. 1 in the U.S. for players 18-and Under in 1990. She was inducted into the University of Florida Athletic Hall of Fame as a "Gator Great" in 2003.

=== 2005–2007 ===
Played the first half of the year with Rennae Stubbs before beginning a partnership with Samantha Stosur, winning the US Open, her second doubles crown at Flushing Meadows, and the season-ending championships, also her second. Raymond and Stosur won six titles together and were named ITF World Doubles Champions of 2005.

In 2006, Raymond and Stosur won ten titles including the French Open and their second season-ending championships. By winning the French Open, Lisa Raymond became only the 13th person in history to have won all four doubles Grand Slam tournaments. They finished the year as the co-holders of the number-one spot, and won a WTA-leading ten titles. Raymond and Stosur were again awarded by the ITF as World Doubles Champions of 2006. They also received the WTA Team of the Year award for their achievements.

The year 2007 was a good one for Raymond and Stosur, with the pair winning five titles; also that year, Lisa decided to retire from her singles career. However, Stosur was diagnosed with a virus, forcing her to miss the second half of the season meaning Raymond had to play with various partners. Even though they only played half the season together, they had still qualified for the season-ending championships but could not compete.

=== 2008–2009 ===
Raymond began 2008 playing with Elena Likhovtseva with solid results but was cut short due to injury but then reunited with former partner Sam Stosur in May, after the latter's return from injury. They went on to reach the finals of Wimbledon and the US Open, losing both. Raymond also won titles in Memphis and New Haven.

In 2009, Raymond began a partnership with Květa Peschke, where they reached four finals and two semifinals before their year was cut short by an injury to Peschke, just before Wimbledon. Lisa played with different partners, winning one title, taking her tally to 68.

Raymond now considers her 2008–2009 seasons to be almost 'lost' due to a lack of drive in her fitness.

=== 2010 ===
Raymond started the year by reuniting with former partner Rennae Stubbs. They lost their first round in Sydney, before reaching the semi-finals of the Australian Open, as the No. 6 seeds, losing to Venus and Serena Williams. Raymond also made the semifinals of the mixed-doubles tournament. Raymond and Stubbs won the Eastbourne International against Květa Peschke and Katarina Srebotnik in the final, 6–2, 2–6 [13–11]. Both Raymond and Stubbs qualified for the WTA Tour Championships at Doha to face second seeds Peschke and Srebotnik.

=== 2011 ===
Raymond started the year by teaming up with Julia Görges but in April started a new partnership with Liezel Huber. Starting slowly, by May their results picked up with a quarterfinal showing in Warsaw, semifinals at Roland Garros and Birmingham, runners-up in Eastbourne and Stanford. They were also quarter-finalists at Wimbledon and Cincinnati. They won their first tournament in Toronto and then claimed the US Open and Tokyo, with a semifinal finish in Beijing which qualified them for the WTA Championships in Istanbul. Both have stated they want to continue their partnership in 2012 and hopefully play the London Olympics. Raymond has now won six women's Grand Slam doubles titles, three at the US Open, bringing her grand total to nine (three in mixed) and 73 doubles titles in total.

=== 2012 ===
In Raymond's first tournament of the year at Sydney, she and her partner Huber were second seeds, and got to the final. The final against top seeds Peschke and Srebotnik was very close with the first two sets shared. In the deciding third set, the top seeds won 13–11. In the Australian Open, Raymond and Huber got to the quarterfinals without dropping a set but narrowly lost their quarterfinal match to Mirza and Vesnina in the deciding third-set tiebreaker. Raymond and Huber won the next four tournaments which were in Paris, Doha, Dubai and Indian Wells. In Paris, they were the top seeds. Grönefeld and Martić were beaten in the final, in straight sets. In Doha, Raymond and Huber defeated Kops and Spears, in straight sets. In Dubai, they got revenge for their Australian Open defeat to Mirza and Vesnina by beating them in straight sets. At Indian Wells, Raymond and Huber beat Mirza and Vesnina in straight sets. At Wimbledon, as the No. 1 seeds, they lost to eventual champions, Serena and Venus Williams. Raymond's last tournament of the year was the Masters Cup. Her partner in the doubles was Huber. They got to the semifinals losing to Andrea Hlaváčková and Lucie Hradecká, in straight sets.

=== 2013 ===
Raymond started the year ranked No. 6 in doubles. Her first tournament was with partner Maria Kirilenko in Sydney, where they were seeded third. They beat Marina Erakovic and Ekaterina Makarova in straight sets in the first round, but then lost in straight sets to Darija Jurak and Katalin Marosi.

Next, Raymond and Kirilenko played at the Australian Open, where they were seeded No. 3. They were beaten in straight sets in the second round by the Australian duo of 16-year-old Ashleigh Barty (who was playing with a wildcard) and Casey Dellacqua, who later went on to reach the final. After the Australian Open, she dropped to No. 7, being overtaken in the rankings by her partner Maria Kirilenko.

In February, Raymond teamed up with Sam Stosur to play at the Doha tournament, where they were unseeded and beat eighth seeds Bethanie Mattek-Sands and Sania Mirza in straight sets, then beat Janette Husárová and Zhang Shuai 2-1 sets, but lost in the quarterfinals against third seeded Raquel Kops-Jones and Abigail Spears, in straight sets.

Next, in March, Raymond played in Miami, where she teamed up with British teenager Laura Robson (who was playing with a wildcard). They reached the semifinals, where they beat 1st seeds and world No. 1 pair, Errani and Vinci, in straight sets with the loss of just three games, but then lost in straight sets against third seeds Nadia Petrova and Katarina Srebotnik in the final. This partnership continued into the 2013 Wimbledon tournament.

=== 2014 ===
Raymond started the year ranked 42 in doubles. She reached the final of her first tournament of the year, Hobart, with Zhang Shuai as her partner. They narrowly lost to Monica Niculescu and Clara Zakopalová. In the Australian Open, she partnered with Hantuchová. They reached the third round and got knocked out by Makarova and Vesnina. At Nuremberg, she got as far as semifinal with Huber as her partner. The same pair lost to eventual French Open champions Hsieh and Peng in the third round. At Wimbledon, Raymond and Huber were seeded 15th but lost in the second round. In the US Open, Raymond teamed up with King, and they got to the third round before losing to the eventual tournament winners, Makarova and Vesnina. Raymond's best result in the mixed doubles was a second-round exit at the Australian Open with Mariusz Fyrstenberg from Poland as her partner. In the French Open and US Open, she lost in the first round with Peers and Lipsky, respectively.

== Grand Slam finals ==
=== Doubles: 13 (6–7) ===
Result	Year	Championship	Surface	Partner	Opponents	Score
Loss	1994	French Open	Clay	(United States) Lindsay Davenport	(United States) Gigi Fernández (Belarus) Natasha Zvereva	6–2, 6–2
Loss	1997	Australian Open	Hard	(United States) Lindsay Davenport	(Switzerland) Martina Hingis (Belarus) Natasha Zvereva	6–2, 6–2
Loss	1997	French Open	Clay	(United States) Mary Joe Fernández	(United States) Gigi Fernández (Belarus) Natasha Zvereva	6–2, 6–3
Win	2000	Australian Open	Hard	(Australia) Rennae Stubbs	(Switzerland) Martina Hingis (France) Mary Pierce	6–4, 5–7, 6–4
Win	2001	Wimbledon	Grass	(Australia) Rennae Stubbs	(Belgium) Kim Clijsters (Japan) Ai Sugiyama	6–4, 6–3
Win	2001	US Open	Hard	(Australia) Rennae Stubbs	(United States) Kimberly Po (France) Nathalie Tauziat	6–2, 5–7, 7–5
Loss	2002	French Open	Clay	(Australia) Rennae Stubbs	(Spain) Virginia Ruano Pascual (Argentina) Paola Suárez	6–4, 6–2
Win	2005	US Open	Hard	(Australia) Samantha Stosur	(Russia) Elena Dementieva (Italy) Flavia Pennetta	6–2, 5–7, 6–3
Loss	2006	Australian Open	Hard	(Australia) Samantha Stosur	(China) Yan Zi (China) Zheng Jie	2–6, 7–6^{(9–7)}, 6–3
Win	2006	French Open	Clay	(Australia) Samantha Stosur	(Slovakia) Daniela Hantuchová (Japan) Ai Sugiyama	6–3, 6–2
Loss	2008	Wimbledon	Grass	(Australia) Samantha Stosur	(United States) Serena Williams (United States) Venus Williams	6–2, 6–2
Loss	2008	US Open	Hard	(Australia) Samantha Stosur	(Zimbabwe) Cara Black (United States) Liezel Huber	6–3, 7–6^{(8–6)}
Win	2011	US Open	Hard	(United States) Liezel Huber	(United States) Vania King (Kazakhstan) Yaroslava Shvedova	4–6, 7–6^{(7–5)}, 7–6^{(7–3)}

=== Mixed doubles: 10 (5–5) ===
Result	Year	Championship	Surface	Partner	Opponents	Score
Win	1996	US Open	Hard	(United States) Patrick Galbraith	(Netherlands) Manon Bollegraf (United States) Rick Leach	7–6^{(8–6)}, 7–6^{(7–4)}
Loss	1997	French Open	Clay	(United States) Patrick Galbraith	(Japan) Rika Hiraki (India) Mahesh Bhupathi	6–4, 6–1
Loss	1998	US Open	Hard	(United States) Patrick Galbraith	(United States) Serena Williams (Belarus) Max Mirnyi	6–2, 6–2
Win	1999	Wimbledon	Grass	(India) Leander Paes	(Russia) Anna Kournikova (Sweden) Jonas Björkman	6–4, 3–6, 6–3
Loss	2001	US Open	Hard	(India) Leander Paes	(Australia) Rennae Stubbs (Australia) Todd Woodbridge	6–4, 5–7, [11–9]
Win	2002	US Open	Hard	(United States) Mike Bryan	(Slovenia) Katarina Srebotnik (United States) Bob Bryan	7–6^{(11–9)}, 7–6^{(7–1)}
Win	2003	French Open	Clay	(United States) Mike Bryan	(Russia) Elena Likhovtseva (India) Mahesh Bhupathi	6–3, 6–4
Loss	2010	Wimbledon	Grass	(South Africa) Wesley Moodie	(Zimbabwe) Cara Black (India) Leander Paes	6–4, 7–6^{(7–5)}
Win	2012	Wimbledon	Grass	(United States) Mike Bryan	(Russia) Elena Vesnina (India) Leander Paes	6–3, 5–7, 6–4
Loss	2013	Wimbledon	Grass	(Brazil) Bruno Soares	(France) Kristina Mladenovic (Canada) Daniel Nestor	5–7, 6–2, 8–6

== WTA Tour Championships ==
=== Doubles: 4 titles ===
Result	Year	Location	Partner	Opponents	Score
Win	2001	Munich, Germany	(Australia) Rennae Stubbs	(Zimbabwe) Cara Black (Russia) Elena Likhovtseva	7–5, 3–6, 6–3
Win	2005	Los Angeles, US	(Australia) Samantha Stosur	(Zimbabwe) Cara Black (Australia) Rennae Stubbs	6–7, 7–5, 6–4
Win	2006	Madrid, Spain	(Australia) Samantha Stosur	(Zimbabwe) Cara Black (Australia) Rennae Stubbs	3–6, 6–3, 6–3
Win	2011	Istanbul, Turkey	(United States) Liezel Huber	(Czech Republic) Květa Peschke (Slovenia) Katarina Srebotnik	6–4, 6–4

== Olympic medal match ==
=== Doubles (0–1) ===
Result	Year	Location	Surface	Partner	Opponents	Score
4th place	2012	London	Grass	(United States) Liezel Huber	(Russia) Maria Kirilenko (Russia) Nadia Petrova	6–4, 4–6, 1–6

== WTA Tour finals ==
=== Singles: 12 (4 titles, 8 runner-ups) ===
Legend
Grand Slam
Tier I / Premier M & Premier 5
Tier II / Premier (0–3)
Tier III, IV & V / International (4–5)

Result	W–L	Date	Tournament	Tier	Surface	Opponent	Score
Loss	0–1	May 1994	Lucerne, Switzerland		Clay	(United States) Lindsay Davenport	7–6^{(7–3)}, 6–4
Loss	0–2	Feb 1995	Chicago, US	Tier II	Carpet (i)	(Bulgaria) Magdalena Maleeva	7–5, 7–6^{(7–2)}
Loss	0–3	Aug 1995	San Diego, US	Tier II	Hard	(Spain) Conchita Martínez	6–2, 6–0
Win	1–3	Oct 1996	Quebec City, Canada		Hard (i)	(Belgium) Els Callens	6–4, 6–4
Loss	1–4	Feb 1997	Oklahoma City, US		Hard (i)	(United States) Lindsay Davenport	6–4, 6–2
Loss	1–5	Oct 1997	Filderstadt, Germany	Tier II	Hard (i)	(Switzerland) Martina Hingis	6–4, 6–2
Win	2–5	Jun 2000	Birmingham, UK		Grass	(Thailand) Tamarine Tanasugarn	6–2, 6–7^{(7–9)}, 6–4
Loss	2–6	Oct 2001	Kockelscheuer, Luxembourg		Hard (i)	(Belgium) Kim Clijsters	6–2, 6–2
Win	3–6	Feb 2002	Memphis, US		Hard (i)	(United States) Alexandra Stevenson	4–6, 6–3, 7–6^{(11–9)}
Loss	3–7	Sep 2002	Waikoloa, US		Hard	(Zimbabwe) Cara Black	7–6^{(7–1)}, 6–4
Win	4–7	Feb 2003	Memphis, US		Hard (i)	(South Africa) Amanda Coetzer	6–3, 6–2
Loss	4–8	Feb 2004	Memphis, US		Hard (i)	(Russia) Vera Zvonareva	4–6, 6–4, 7–5

=== Doubles: 122 (79–43) ===
Legend
Grand Slam (6–7)
WTA Championships (4–0)
Tier I / Premier M & Premier 5 (24–13)
Tier II / Premier (35–17)
Tier III, IV & V / International (10–6)

Result	W–L	Date	Tournament	Surface	Partner	Opponents	Score
Win	1.	Sep 1993	Tokyo, Japan	Hard	(United States) Chanda Rubin	(South Africa) Amanda Coetzer (United States) Linda Wild	6–4, 6–1
Win	2.	Feb 1994	Indian Wells, US	Hard	(United States) Lindsay Davenport	(Netherlands) Manon Bollegraf (Czech Republic) Helena Suková	6–2, 6–4
Loss	1.	Jun 1994	French Open, Paris, France	Clay	(United States) Lindsay Davenport	(United States) Gigi Fernández (Belarus) Natasha Zvereva	6–2, 6–2
Loss	2.	Aug 1994	Los Angeles, US	Hard	(Czech Republic) Jana Novotná	(France) Julie Halard-Decugis (France) Nathalie Tauziat	6–1, 0–6, 6–1
Win	3.	Mar 1995	Indian Wells, US	Hard	(United States) Lindsay Davenport	(Spain) Arantxa Sánchez Vicario (Latvia) Larisa Neiland	2–6, 6–4, 6–3
Loss	3.	Nov 1995	Quebec City, Canada	Hard (i)	(Australia) Rennae Stubbs	(United States) Nicole Arendt (Netherlands) Manon Bollegraf	7–6^{(8–6)}, 4–6, 6–2
Win	4.	Nov 1996	Chicago, US	Carpet (i)	(Australia) Rennae Stubbs	(United States) Angela Lettiere (Japan) Nana Miyagi	6–1, 6–1
Win	5.	Nov 1996	Philadelphia, US	Carpet (i)	(Australia) Rennae Stubbs	(United States) Nicole Arendt (United States) Lori McNeil	6–4, 3–6, 6–3
Loss	4.	Jan 1997	Australian Open	Hard	(United States) Lindsay Davenport	(Switzerland) Martina Hingis (Belarus) Natasha Zvereva	6–2, 6–2
Loss	5.	Mar 1997	Indian Wells, US	Hard	(France) Nathalie Tauziat	(United States) Lindsay Davenport (Belarus) Natasha Zvereva	6–3, 6–2
Loss	6.	Jun 1997	French Open, Paris, France	Clay	(United States) Mary Joe Fernández	(United States) Gigi Fernández (Belarus) Natasha Zvereva	6–2, 6–3
Win	6.	Oct 1997	Quebec City, Canada	Hard (i)	(Australia) Rennae Stubbs	(France) Alexandra Fusai (France) Nathalie Tauziat	6–4, 5–7, 7–5
Win	7.	Nov 1997	Philadelphia, US	Carpet (i)	(Australia) Rennae Stubbs	(United States) Lindsay Davenport (United States) Jana Novotná	6–3, 7–5
Win	8.	Feb 1998	Hanover, Germany	Carpet (i)	(Australia) Rennae Stubbs	(Russia) Elena Likhovtseva (Netherlands) Caroline Vis	6–1, 6–7^{(4–7)}, 6–3
Loss	7.	Apr 1998	Hilton Head, US	Clay	(Australia) Rennae Stubbs	(Spain) Conchita Martínez (Argentina) Patricia Tarabini	3–6, 6–4, 6–4
Loss	8.	Jun 1998	Birmingham, UK	Grass	(Australia) Rennae Stubbs	(Belgium) Els Callens (France) Julie Halard-Decugis	2–6, 6–4, 6–4
Win	9.	Aug 1998	Boston, US	Hard	(Australia) Rennae Stubbs	(South Africa) Mariaan de Swardt (United States) Mary Joe Fernández	6–4, 6–4
Loss	9.	Oct 1998	Moscow, Russia	Carpet (i)	(Australia) Rennae Stubbs	(France) Mary Pierce (Belarus) Natasha Zvereva	6–3, 6–4
Win	10.	Feb 1999	Oklahoma City, US	Hard (i)	(Australia) Rennae Stubbs	(South Africa) Amanda Coetzer (South Africa) Jessica Steck	6–3, 6–4
Loss	10.	Apr 1999	Amelia Island, US	Clay	(Australia) Rennae Stubbs	(Spain) Conchita Martínez (Argentina) Patricia Tarabini	7–5, 0–6, 6–4
Loss	11.	Aug 1999	Los Angeles, US	Hard	(Australia) Rennae Stubbs	(Spain) Arantxa Sánchez Vicario (Latvia) Larisa Neiland	6–2, 6–7^{(5–7)}, 6–0
Win	11.	Aug 1999	New Haven, US	Hard	(Australia) Rennae Stubbs	(Russia) Elena Likhovtseva (Czech Republic) Jana Novotná	7–6^{(7–1)}, 6–2
Win	12.	Oct 1999	Zürich, Switzerland	Hard (i)	(Australia) Rennae Stubbs	(France) Nathalie Tauziat (Belarus) Natasha Zvereva	6–2, 6–2
Win	13.	Oct 1999	Moscow, Russia	Carpet (i)	(Australia) Rennae Stubbs	(France) Julie Halard-Decugis (Germany) Anke Huber	6–1, 6–0
Win	14.	Nov 1999	Philadelphia, US	Carpet (i)	(Australia) Rennae Stubbs	(United States) Chanda Rubin (France) Sandrine Testud	6–1, 7–6^{(7–2)}
Win	15.	Jan 2000	Australian Open, Melbourne, Australia	Hard	(Australia) Rennae Stubbs	(Switzerland) Martina Hingis (France) Mary Pierce	6–4, 5–7, 6–4
Win	16.	May 2000	Rome, Italy	Clay	(Australia) Rennae Stubbs	(Spain) Arantxa Sánchez Vicario (Spain) Magüi Serna	6–3, 4–6, 6–2
Win	17.	May 2000	Madrid, Spain	Clay	(Australia) Rennae Stubbs	(Spain) Gala León García (Spain) María Sánchez Lorenzo	6–1, 6–3
Loss	12.	Jun 2000	Eastbourne, UK	Grass	(Australia) Rennae Stubbs	(Japan) Ai Sugiyama (France) Nathalie Tauziat	2–6, 6–3, 7–6^{(3)}
Win	18.	Aug 2000	San Diego, US	Hard	(Australia) Rennae Stubbs	(United States) Lindsay Davenport (Russia) Anna Kournikova	4–6, 6–3, 7–6^{(8–6)}
Loss	13.	Nov 2000	Philadelphia, US	Carpet (i)	(Australia) Rennae Stubbs	(Switzerland) Martina Hingis (Russia) Anna Kournikova	6–2, 7–5
Loss	14.	Jan 2001	Sydney, Australia	Hard	(Australia) Rennae Stubbs	(Russia) Anna Kournikova (Austria) Barbara Schett	6–2, 7–5
Win	19.	Feb 2001	Tokyo, Japan	Carpet (i)	(Australia) Rennae Stubbs	(Russia) Anna Kournikova (Uzbekistan) Iroda Tulyaganova	7–6^{(5)}, 2–6, 7–6^{(8–6)}
Win	20.	Mar 2001	Scottsdale, US	Hard	(Australia) Rennae Stubbs	(Belgium) Kim Clijsters (United States) Meghann Shaughnessy	w/o
Loss	15.	Apr 2001	Miami, US	Hard	(Australia) Rennae Stubbs	(Spain) Arantxa Sánchez Vicario (France) Nathalie Tauziat	6–0, 6–4
Win	21.	Apr 2001	Charleston, US	Clay	(Australia) Rennae Stubbs	(Spain) Virginia Ruano Pascual (Argentina) Paola Suárez	5–7, 7–6^{(7–5)}, 6–3
Loss	16.	May 2001	Madrid, Spain	Clay	(Australia) Rennae Stubbs	(Spain) Virginia Ruano Pascual (Argentina) Paola Suárez	7–5, 2–6, 7–6^{(7–4)}
Win	22.	Jun 2001	Eastbourne, UK	Grass	(Australia) Rennae Stubbs	(Zimbabwe) Cara Black (Russia) Elena Likhovtseva	6–2, 6–2
Win	23.	Jul 2001	Wimbledon, London, UK	Grass	(Australia) Rennae Stubbs	(Belgium) Kim Clijsters (Japan) Ai Sugiyama	6–4, 6–3
Win	24.	Sep 2001	US Open, New York, US	Hard	(Australia) Rennae Stubbs	(United States) Kimberly Po (France) Nathalie Tauziat	6–2, 5–7, 7–5
Win	25.	Oct 2001	Filderstadt, Germany	Hard (i)	(United States) Lindsay Davenport	(Belgium) Justine Henin (United States) Meghann Shaughnessy	6–4, 6–7^{(4–7)}, 7–5
Win	26.	Oct 2001	Zurich, Switzerland	Hard (i)	(United States) Lindsay Davenport	(France) Sandrine Testud (Italy) Roberta Vinci	6–3, 2–6, 6–2
Win	27.	Nov 2001	Munich, Germany	Carpet (i)	(Australia) Rennae Stubbs	(Zimbabwe) Cara Black (Russia) Elena Likhovtseva	7–5, 3–6, 6–3
Win	28.	Jan 2002	Sydney, Australia	Hard	(Australia) Rennae Stubbs	(Switzerland) Martina Hingis (Russia) Anna Kournikova	w/o
Win	29.	Feb 2002	Tokyo, Japan	Carpet (i)	(Australia) Rennae Stubbs	(Belgium) Els Callens (Italy) Roberta Vinci	6–1, 6–1
Win	30.	Mar 2002	Scottsdale, US	Hard	(Australia) Rennae Stubbs	(Zimbabwe) Cara Black (Russia) Elena Likhovtseva	6–3, 5–7, 7–6^{(7–4)}
Win	31.	Mar 2002	Indian Wells, US	Hard	(Australia) Rennae Stubbs	(Russia) Elena Dementieva (Slovakia) Janette Husárová	7–5, 6–0
Win	32.	Apr 2002	Miami, US	Hard	(Australia) Rennae Stubbs	(Spain) Virginia Ruano Pascual (Argentina) Paola Suárez	7–6^{(4)}, 6–7^{(4–7)}, 6–3
Win	33.	Apr 2002	Charleston, US	Clay	(Australia) Rennae Stubbs	(France) Alexandra Fusai (Netherlands) Caroline Vis	6–4, 3–6, 7–6^{(7–4)}
Loss	17.	Jun 2002	French Open, Paris, France	Clay	(Australia) Rennae Stubbs	(Spain) Virginia Ruano Pascual (Argentina) Paola Suárez	6–4, 6–2
Win	34.	Jun 2002	Eastbourne, UK	Grass	(Australia) Rennae Stubbs	(Zimbabwe) Cara Black (Russia) Elena Likhovtseva	6–7^{(5–7)}, 7–6^{(8–6)}, 6–2
Win	35.	Jul 2002	Stanford, US	Hard	(Australia) Rennae Stubbs	(Slovakia) Janette Husárová (Spain) Conchita Martínez	6–1, 6–1
Win	36.	Oct 2002	Filderstadt, Germany	Hard (i)	(United States) Lindsay Davenport	(United States) Meghann Shaughnessy (Argentina) Paola Suárez	6–2, 6–4
Loss	18.	Feb 2003	Tokyo, Japan	Carpet (i)	(United States) Lindsay Davenport	(Russia) Elena Bovina (Australia) Rennae Stubbs	6–3, 6–4
Loss	19.	Mar 2003	Scottsdale, US	Hard	(United States) Lindsay Davenport	(Belgium) Kim Clijsters (Japan) Ai Sugiyama	6–1, 6–4
Win	37.	Mar 2003	Indian Wells, US	Hard	(United States) Lindsay Davenport	(Belgium) Kim Clijsters (Japan) Ai Sugiyama	3–6, 6–4, 6–1
Win	38.	Apr 2003	Amelia Island, US	Clay	(United States) Lindsay Davenport	(Spain) Virginia Ruano Pascual (Argentina) Paola Suárez	7–5, 6–2
Win	39.	Jun 2003	Eastbourne, UK	Grass	(United States) Lindsay Davenport	(United States) Jennifer Capriati (Spain) Magüi Serna	6–3, 6–2
Win	40.	Jul 2003	Stanford, US	Hard	(Zimbabwe) Cara Black	(South Korea) Cho Yoon-jeong (Italy) Francesca Schiavone	7–6^{(7–5)}, 6–1
Loss	20.	Aug 2003	San Diego, US	Hard	(United States) Lindsay Davenport	(Belgium) Kim Clijsters (Japan) Ai Sugiyama	6–4, 7–5
Win	41.	Oct 2003	Filderstadt, Germany	Hard (i)	(Australia) Rennae Stubbs	(Zimbabwe) Cara Black (United States) Martina Navratilova	6–2, 6–4
Win	42.	Nov 2003	Philadelphia, US	Hard (i)	(United States) Martina Navratilova	(Zimbabwe) Cara Black (Australia) Rennae Stubbs	6–3, 6–4
Loss	21.	Apr 2004	Charleston, US	Clay	(United States) Martina Navratilova	(Spain) Virginia Ruano Pascual (Argentina) Paola Suárez	6–4, 6–1
Win	43.	May 2004	Vienna, Austria	Clay	(United States) Martina Navratilova	(Zimbabwe) Cara Black (Australia) Rennae Stubbs	6–2, 7–5
Loss	22.	Aug 2004	New Haven, US	Hard	(United States) Martina Navratilova	(Russia) Nadia Petrova (United States) Meghann Shaughnessy	6–1, 1–6, 7–6^{(7–4)}
Win	44.	Nov 2004	Philadelphia, US	Hard (i)	(Australia) Alicia Molik	(South Africa) Liezel Huber (United States) Corina Morariu	7–5, 6–4
Loss	23.	Apr 2005	Miami, US	Hard	(Australia) Rennae Stubbs	(Russia) Svetlana Kuznetsova (Australia) Alicia Molik	7–5, 6–7^{(5–7)}, 6–2
Win	45.	Jun 2005	Eastbourne, UK	Grass	(Australia) Rennae Stubbs	(Russia) Elena Likhovtseva (Russia) Vera Zvonareva	6–3, 7–5
Win	46.	Aug 2005	New Haven, US	Hard	(Australia) Samantha Stosur	(Argentina) Gisela Dulko (Russia) Maria Kirilenko	6–2, 6–7^{(6–8)}, 6–1
Win	47.	Sept 2005	US Open	Hard	(Australia) Samantha Stosur	(Russia) Elena Dementieva (Italy) Flavia Pennetta	6–2, 5–7, 6–3
Win	48.	Oct 2005	Luxembourg City	Hard (i)	(Australia) Samantha Stosur	(Zimbabwe) Cara Black (Australia) Rennae Stubbs	7–5, 6–1
Win	49.	Oct 2005	Moscow, Russia	Carpet (i)	(Australia) Samantha Stosur	(Zimbabwe) Cara Black (Australia) Rennae Stubbs	6–2, 6–4
Loss	24.	Nov 2005	Philadelphia, US	Hard (i)	(Australia) Samantha Stosur	(Zimbabwe) Cara Black (Australia) Rennae Stubbs	6–4, 7–6^{(7–4)}
Win	50.	Nov 2005	Los Angeles, US	Hard (i)	(Australia) Samantha Stosur	(Zimbabwe) Cara Black (Australia) Rennae Stubbs	6–7^{(5–7)}, 7–5, 6–4
Loss	25.	Jan 2006	Australian Open	Hard	(Australia) Samantha Stosur	(China) Yan Zi (China) Zheng Jie	2–6, 7–6^{(9–7)}, 6–3
Win	51.	Feb 2006	Tokyo, Japan	Carpet (i)	(Australia) Samantha Stosur	(Zimbabwe) Cara Black (Australia) Rennae Stubbs	6–2, 6–1
Win	52.	Feb 2006	Memphis, US	Carpet (i)	(Australia) Samantha Stosur	(Belarus) Victoria Azarenka (Denmark) Caroline Wozniacki	7–6^{(7–2)}, 6–3
Win	53.	Mar 2006	Indian Wells, US	Hard	(Australia) Samantha Stosur	(Spain) Virginia Ruano Pascual (United States) Meghann Shaughnessy	6–2, 7–5
Win	54.	Apr 2006	Miami, US	Hard	(Australia) Samantha Stosur	(South Africa) Liezel Huber (United States) Martina Navratilova	6–4, 7–5
Win	55.	Apr 2006	Charleston, US	Clay	(Australia) Samantha Stosur	(Spain) Virginia Ruano Pascual (United States) Meghann Shaughnessy	3–6, 6–1, 6–1
Win	56.	Jun 2006	French Open	Clay	(Australia) Samantha Stosur	(Slovakia) Daniela Hantuchová (Japan) Ai Sugiyama	6–3, 6–2
Loss	26.	Aug 2006	New Haven, US	Hard	(Australia) Samantha Stosur	(China) Yan Zi (China) Zheng Jie	6–4, 6–2
Win	57.	Oct 2006	Stuttgart, Germany	Hard (i)	(Australia) Samantha Stosur	(Zimbabwe) Cara Black (Australia) Rennae Stubbs	6–3, 6–4
Win	58.	Oct 2006	Linz, Austria	Hard (i)	(Australia) Samantha Stosur	(United States) Corina Morariu (Slovenia) Katarina Srebotnik	6–3, 6–0
Win	59.	Nov 2006	Hasselt, Belgium	Hard (i)	(Australia) Samantha Stosur	(Greece) Eleni Daniilidou (Germany) Jasmin Wöhr	6–2, 6–3
Win	60.	Nov 2006	Madrid, Spain	Hard (i)	(Australia) Samantha Stosur	(Zimbabwe) Cara Black (Australia) Rennae Stubbs	3–6, 6–3, 6–3
Win	61.	Feb 2007	Tokyo, Japan	Carpet (i)	(Australia) Samantha Stosur	(United States) Vania King (Australia) Rennae Stubbs	7–6^{(6)}, 3–6, 7–5
Win	62.	Mar 2007	Indian Wells, US	Hard	(Australia) Samantha Stosur	(Chinese Taipei) Chan Yung-jan (Chinese Taipei) Chuang Chia-jung	6–3, 7–5
Win	63.	Apr 2007	Miami, US	Hard	(Australia) Samantha Stosur	(Zimbabwe) Cara Black (South Africa) Liezel Huber	6–4, 3–6, [10–2]
Win	64.	May 2007	Berlin, Germany	Clay	(Australia) Samantha Stosur	(Italy) Tathiana Garbin (Italy) Roberta Vinci	6–3, 6–4
Win	65.	Jun 2007	Eastbourne, UK	Grass	(Australia) Samantha Stosur	(Czech Republic) Květa Peschke (Australia) Rennae Stubbs	6–7^{(5–7)}, 6–4, 6–3
Loss	27.	Oct 2007	Zürich, Switzerland	Carpet (i)	(Italy) Francesca Schiavone	(Czech Republic) Květa Peschke (Australia) Rennae Stubbs	7–5, 7–6^{(7–1)}
Win	66.	Mar 2008	Memphis, US	Hard (i)	(United States) Lindsay Davenport	(United States) Angela Haynes (United States) Mashona Washington	6–3, 6–1
Loss	28.	Jul 2008	Wimbledon	Grass	(Australia) Samantha Stosur	(United States) Serena Williams (United States) Venus Williams	6–2, 6–2
Win	67.	Aug 2008	New Haven, US	Hard	(Czech Republic) Květa Peschke	(Romania) Sorana Cîrstea (Romania) Monica Niculescu	4–6, 7–5, [10–7]
Loss	29.	Sep 2008	US Open	Hard	(Australia) Samantha Stosur	(Zimbabwe) Cara Black (United States) Liezel Huber	6–3, 7–6^{(8–6)}
Loss	30.	Sep 2008	Tokyo, Japan	Hard	(Australia) Samantha Stosur	(United States) Vania King (Russia) Nadia Petrova	6–1, 6–4
Loss	31.	Feb 2009	Paris, France	Hard (i)	(Czech Republic) Květa Peschke	(Zimbabwe) Cara Black (United States) Liezel Huber	6–4, 3–6, [10–4]
Loss	32.	Apr 2009	Miami, US	Hard	(Czech Republic) Květa Peschke	(Russia) Svetlana Kuznetsova (France) Amélie Mauresmo	4–6, 6–3, [10–3]
Loss	33.	Apr 2009	Ponte Vedra Beach, US	Clay	(Czech Republic) Květa Peschke	(Chinese Taipei) Chuang Chia-jung (India) Sania Mirza	6–3, 4–6, [10–7]
Loss	34.	May 2009	Madrid, Spain	Clay	(Czech Republic) Květa Peschke	(Zimbabwe) Cara Black (United States) Liezel Huber	4–6, 6–3, [10–6]
Win	68.	Oct 2009	Osaka, Japan	Hard	(Chinese Taipei) Chuang Chia-jung	(South Africa) Chanelle Scheepers (United States) Abigail Spears	6–2, 6–4
Win	69.	Jun 2010	Birmingham, UK	Grass	(Zimbabwe) Cara Black	(United States) Liezel Huber (United States) Bethanie Mattek-Sands	6–3, 3–2 ret
Win	70.	Jun 2010	Eastbourne, UK	Grass	(Australia) Rennae Stubbs	(Czech Republic) Květa Peschke (Slovenia) Katarina Srebotnik	6–2, 2–6, [13–11]
Loss	35.	Aug 2010	San Diego, US	Hard	(Australia) Rennae Stubbs	(Russia) Maria Kirilenko (China) Zheng Jie	6–4, 6–4
Loss	36.	Aug 2010	Cincinnati, US	Hard	(Australia) Rennae Stubbs	(Belarus) Victoria Azarenka (Russia) Maria Kirilenko	7–6^{(7–4)}, 7–6^{(8)}
Loss	37.	Jun 2011	Eastbourne, UK	Grass	(United States) Liezel Huber	(Czech Republic) Květa Peschke (Slovenia) Katarina Srebotnik	6–3, 6–0
Loss	38.	Jul 2011	Stanford, US	Hard	(United States) Liezel Huber	(Belarus) Victoria Azarenka (Russia) Maria Kirilenko	6–1, 6–3
Win	71.	Aug 2011	Toronto, Canada	Hard	(United States) Liezel Huber	(Belarus) Victoria Azarenka (Russia) Maria Kirilenko	w/o
Win	72.	Sep 2011	US Open, New York, US	Hard	(United States) Liezel Huber	(United States) Vania King (Kazakhstan) Yaroslava Shvedova	4–6, 7–6^{(7–5)}, 7–6^{(7–3)}
Win	73.	Oct 2011	Tokyo, Japan	Hard	(United States) Liezel Huber	(Argentina) Gisela Dulko (Italy) Flavia Pennetta	7–6^{(7–4)}, 0–6, [10–6]
Win	74.	Oct 2011	Istanbul, Turkey	Hard (i)	(United States) Liezel Huber	(Czech Republic) Květa Peschke (Slovenia) Katarina Srebotnik	6–4, 6–4
Loss	39.	Jan 2012	Sydney, Australia	Hard	(United States) Liezel Huber	(Czech Republic) Květa Peschke (Slovenia) Katarina Srebotnik	6–1, 4–6, [13–11]
Win	75.	Feb 2012	Paris, France	Hard (i)	(United States) Liezel Huber	(Germany) Anna-Lena Grönefeld (Croatia) Petra Martić	7–6^{(7–3)}, 6–1
Win	76.	Feb 2012	Doha, Qatar	Hard	(United States) Liezel Huber	(United States) Raquel Kops-Jones (United States) Abigail Spears	6–3, 6–1
Win	77.	Feb 2012	Dubai, UAE	Hard	(United States) Liezel Huber	(India) Sania Mirza (Russia) Elena Vesnina	6–2, 6–1
Win	78.	Mar 2012	Indian Wells, US	Hard	(United States) Liezel Huber	(India) Sania Mirza (Russia) Elena Vesnina	6–2, 6–3
Loss	40.	Jun 2012	Birmingham, UK	Grass	(United States) Liezel Huber	(Hungary) Tímea Babos (Chinese Taipei) Hsieh Su-wei	7–5, 6–7^{(2–7)}, [10–8]
Loss	41.	Jun 2012	Eastbourne, UK	Grass	(United States) Liezel Huber	(Spain) Nuria Llagostera Vives (Spain) María José Martínez Sánchez	6–4, ret.
Win	79.	Aug 2012	New Haven, US	Hard	(United States) Liezel Huber	(Czech Republic) Andrea Hlaváčková (Czech Republic) Lucie Hradecká	4–6, 6–0, [10–4]
Loss	42.	Mar 2013	Miami, US	Hard	(United Kingdom) Laura Robson	(Russia) Nadia Petrova (Slovenia) Katarina Srebotnik	6–1, 7–6^{(7–2)}
Loss	43.	Jan 2014	Hobart, Australia	Hard	(China) Zhang Shuai	(Romania) Monica Niculescu (Czech Republic) Klára Zakopalová	2–6, 7–6^{(7–5)}, [8–10]

== Team events ==
=== Fed Cup ===
Country: USA Years participated: 1997, 1998, 2000, 2002, 2003, 2004, 2007, 2008 Best result: Winning team 2000

Overall record: 14–9 Singles record: 3–6 Doubles record: 11–3

=== Hopman Cup ===
Country: USA Years participated: 2006 Best result: Winning team 2006 (w/Taylor Dent)

Overall record: 3–4 Singles record: 0–4 Mixed doubles record: 3–0

=== Olympics ===
Country: USA Years Participated: 2004 Best Result: Doubles Quarter-Finalist (w/Navratilova), Singles 3rd Round

Overall Record: 3–2 Singles Record: 2–1 Doubles Record: 1–1

== Performance timelines ==
Key
W	F	SF	QF	#R	RR	Q#	DNQ	A	NH

(W) winner; (F) finalist; (SF) semifinalist; (QF) quarterfinalist; (#R) rounds 4, 3, 2, 1; (RR) round-robin stage; (Q#) qualification round; (DNQ) did not qualify; (A) absent; (NH) not held; (SR) strike rate (events won / competed); (W–L) win–loss record.

=== Singles ===
Tournament	1989	1990	1991	1992	1993	1994	1995	1996	1997	1998	1999	2000	2001	2002	2003	2004	2005	2006	W–L
Grand Slam tournaments
Australian Open	A	A	A	A	A	2R	3R	1R	2R	3R	1R	2R	1R	3R	2R	QF	3R	1R	16–12
French Open	A	A	A	A	A	1R	A	1R	4R	1R	1R	2R	1R	1R	2R	2R	1R	1R	6–12
Wimbledon	A	A	A	A	4R	1R	4R	2R	2R	1R	4R	QF	3R	4R	3R	2R	1R	2R	24–14
US Open	1R	1R	LQ	2R	2R	3R	2R	4R	2R	3R	2R	3R	3R	3R	2R	3R	2R	1R	25–18
Win–loss	0–1	0–1	0–0	1–1	3–2	3–4	6–3	4–4	6–4	4–4	4–4	8–4	4–4	7–4	5–4	8–4	3–4	1–4	71–56

=== Doubles ===
Tournament	1990	1991	1992	1993	1994	1995	1996	1997	1998	1999	2000	2001	2002	2003	2004	2005	2006	2007	2008	2009	2010	2011	2012	2013	2014	2015	2019	2020	SR	W–L
Grand Slam tournaments
Australian Open	A	A	A	A	3R	SF	QF	F	SF	SF	W	1R	SF	SF	2R	2R	F	SF	1R	3R	SF	3R	QF	2R	3R	1R	A		1 / 22	60–21
French Open	A	A	A	A	F	A	3R	F	1R	1R	3R	SF	F	3R	SF	QF	W	SF	3R	3R	3R	SF	1R	A	3R	A	A		1 / 19	53–17
Wimbledon	A	A	A	A	3R	1R	3R	QF	SF	3R	SF	W	QF	SF	SF	1R	3R	SF	F	1R	QF	QF	SF	2R	2R	QF	A		1 / 22	60–21
US Open	2R	A	A	2R	QF	3R	2R	3R	SF	3R	QF	W	3R	2R	QF	W	SF	3R	F	1R	QF	W	3R	3R	3R	1R	A		3 / 24	63–21
Win–loss	1–1	0–0	0–0	1–1	12–4	5–3	8–4	15–4	12–4	8–4	15–3	16–2	14–4	11–3	12–4	9–3	17–3	14–4	12–4	4–4	12–4	15–3	9–4	4–3	7–4	3–3	0–0		6 / 87	236–80
Year-end championships
WTA Finals	A	A	A	A	QF	A	QF	A	SF	SF	SF	W	SF	A	A	W	W	A	A	A	SF	W	SF	A	A	A	A		4 / 12	13–8
Olympic Games
Summer Olympics	Not Held		A	Not Held			A	Not Held			A	Not Held			QF	Not Held			A	Not Held			SF	Not Held					0 / 2	4–2
Premier Mandatory tournaments
Indian Wells Open	Tier II						SF	F	A	QF	1R	SF	W	W	2R	SF	W	W	1R	1R	1R	1R	W	2R	A	SF	A		5 / 18	42–13
Miami Open	A	A	A	A	3R	3R	3R	1R	A	A	QF	F	W	2R	SF	F	W	W	QF	F	SF	2R	1R	F	1R	1R	A		3 / 20	46–15
Madrid Open	Not Held																			F	2R	2R	2R	1R	1R	2R	A		0 / 7	4–7
China Open	Not Held				Tier IV			Not Held			Tier IV			Tier II						1R	1R	SF	1R	QF	2R	A	A		0 / 6	5–5
Premier 5 tournaments
Dubai / Qatar Open^{[1]}	Not Held											Not Tier I							A	2R	2R	QF	W	QF	2R	A	A		1 / 6	9–5
Italian Open	A	A	A	A	A	A	A	A	QF	A	W	A	A	A	2R	A	2R	2R	2R	QF	SF	2R	SF	2R	2R	A	A		1 / 12	11–11
Canadian Open	A	A	A	2R	A	A	QF	QF	2R	A	A	QF	2R	A	A	A	A	A	A	A	A	W	SF	A	A	A	A		1 / 8	10–7
Cincinnati Open	Not Held														Tier III					2R	F	QF	2R	2R	A	2R	A		0 / 6	6–6
Tokyo / Wuhan Open^{[2]}	Tier II			A	A	A	SF	QF	A	QF	SF	W	W	F	SF	A	W	W	F	QF	SF	W	SF	1R	1R	A	A		5 / 17	38–12
Former Tier I tournaments
Charleston Open	A	A	A	A	SF	A	QF	SF	F	QF	QF	W	W	A	F	SF	W	2R	QF	Premier									3 / 13	31–10
German Open	A	A	A	A	A	A	A	A	SF	1R	A	A	A	A	A	A	A	W	A	Not held									1 / 3	6–2
San Diego Open	Tier III			Tier II											SF	2R	SF	A	Not held		Premier								0 / 3	4–3
Kremlin Cup	Tier V		Not Held		Tier II			A	F	W	SF	A	A	A	A	W	1R	A	A	Premier									2 / 5	13–3
Zurich Open	Tier II			A	1R	1R	A	1R	QF	W	A	W	A	QF	1R	SF	SF	F	T II	Not held									2 / 11	17–8
Philadelphia	NH	Tier II		QF	SF	SF	Tier II					Not held		Tier II			Not held												0 / 3	5–3
Career statistics
	1990	1991	1992	1993	1994	1995	1996	1997	1998	1999	2000	2001	2002	2003	2004	2005	2006	2007	2008	2009	2010	2011	2012	2013	2014	2015	2019	2020	Career	
Tournaments	1	1	2	7	16	13	19	17	21	21	20	18	19	16	18	21	23	16	18	21	20	21	23	21	19	12	1		425	
Titles	0	0	0	1	1	1	2	2	2	5	4	9	9	6	2	6	10	5	2	1	2	4	5	0	0	0	0		79	
Finals	0	0	0	1	3	2	2	5	5	7	6	12	10	9	4	8	12	6	5	5	4	6	8	1	1	0	0		122	
Overall win–loss	1–1	0–1	2–2	13–6	30–12	23–11	34–17	34–15	40–19	45–16	44–16	59–9	53–9	46–8	37–16	43–15	60–13	40–10	32–16	28–20	33–18	40–17	49–19	22–20	21–18	12–12	1–1		861–347	
Year-end ranking	218	725	—N/a	32	10	16	12	12	5	5	5	1	3	5	10	3	1	3	8	18	9	4	6	29	44	61	1074		71.27%	

=== Mixed doubles ===
Tournament	1990	1991	1992	1993	1994	1995	1996	1997	1998	1999	2000	2001	2002	2003	2004	2005	2006	2007	2008	2009	2010	2011	2012	2013	2014	2015	SR	W–L
Grand Slam tournaments
Australian Open	A	A	A	A	A	QF	SF	QF	QF	1R	1R	2R	2R	2R	QF	A	2R	QF	2R	1R	SF	1R	QF	A	2R	2R	0 / 19	25–19
French Open	A	A	A	A	3R	A	2R	F	3R	QF	3R	QF	2R	W	1R	QF	1R	QF	1R	2R	1R	1R	1R	QF	A	A	1 / 19	23–18
Wimbledon	A	A	A	A	3R	1R	1R	2R	1R	W	3R	3R	QF	QF	2R	SF	3R	2R	3R	3R	F	1R	W	F	A	1R	2 / 21	37–19
US Open	1R	A	A	A	1R	1R	W	SF	F	2R	1R	F	W	QF	2R	2R	1R	1R	2R	QF	QF	2R	1R	2R	1R	2R	2 / 23	34–21
Win–loss	0–1	0–0	0–0	0–0	4–3	3–3	11–3	13–4	10–4	10–3	4–4	11–4	11–3	13–3	5–4	8–3	3–4	7–4	4–4	6–4	12–4	1–4	9–3	8–3	1–2	2–3	5 / 82	119–77

== Personal life ==
Raymond is a lesbian, and was in a long-term relationship with her former doubles partner, Rennae Stubbs.

== See also ==
- Florida Gators
- List of Florida Gators tennis players
- List of Olympic medalists in tennis
- List of University of Florida Olympians
- List of University of Florida Athletic Hall of Fame members
