= Adriana Gerši =

Czech tennis player

- Country (sports): Czech Republic
- Born: 26 June 1976 (age 49) Šternberk, Czech Republic
- Height: 1.66 m (5 ft 5 1/2 in)
- Turned pro: 1994
- Retired: 2002
- Plays: Right-handed (two-handed backhand)
- Prize money: $568,774

Singles
- Career record: 186–168
- Career titles: 1 WTA, 5 ITF
- Highest ranking: No. 48 (23 June 1997)

Grand Slam singles results
- Australian Open: 3R (1998)
- French Open: 2R (1998, 1999, 2000)
- Wimbledon: 1R (1997, 98, 2000, 01, 02)
- US Open: 3R (2000)

Doubles
- Career record: 18–17
- Career titles: 2 ITF
- Highest ranking: No. 165 (14 October 1996)

Adriana Gerši (born 26 June 1976) is a former professional tennis player from the Czech Republic.

She reached her career-high singles ranking on 23 July 1997, as the world No. 48, and her career-high doubles ranking on 14 October 1996, as No. 165.

In her career, Gerši won one singles title on the WTA Tour, beating Marie-Gayanay Mikaelian in the final of the tournament of Basel, Switzerland.

== Personal ==
Mother Ludmila is a teacher, father Ivan is a businessman. Adriana married former ATP player David Rikl on 14 June 2003. They are living in Naples, Florida, and have three children.

== WTA Tour finals ==
=== Singles: 1 (title) ===
Legend
Tier I (0–0)
Tier II (0–0)
Tier III (0–0)
Tier IV & V (1–0)

Result	No.	Date	Tournament	Surface	Opponent	Score
Win	1.	5 August 2001	Basel, Switzerland	Clay	(Switzerland) Marie-Gaïané Mikaelian	6–4, 6–1

== ITF Circuit finals ==
$75,000 tournaments
$50,000 tournaments
$25,000 tournaments
$10,000 tournaments

=== Singles (5–3) ===
Outcome	No.	Date	Tournament	Surface	Opponent	Score
Winner	1.	12 September 1994	ITF Cluj, Romania	Clay	(Switzerland) Miroslava Vavrinec	6–2, 6–1
Winner	2.	26 September 1994	ITF Bratislava, Slovakia	Clay	(Czech Republic) Libuše Průšová	6–3, 6–1
Winner	3.	16 October 1994	ITF Burgdorf, Switzerland	Carpet (i)	(Czech Republic) Alena Vašková	6–4, 6–4
Runner-up	4.	17 September 1995	ITF Karlovy Vary, Czech Republic	Clay	(France) Noëlle van Lottum	2–6, 3–6
Winner	5.	8 July 1996	ITF İstanbul, Turkey	Hard	(Czech Republic) Petra Langrová	4–0 ret.
Runner-up	6.	25 April 1998	ITF Prostějov, Czech Republic	Clay	(Romania) Ruxandra Dragomir	0–6, 0–6
Runner-up	7.	18 July 1999	ITF Puchheim, Germany	Clay	(Slovenia) Tina Hergold	6–3, 6–7^{(4)}, 3–6
Winner	8.	9 April 2000	Dubai Challenge, United Arab Emirates	Hard	(Italy) Tathiana Garbin	6–4, 6–3

=== Doubles (2–1) ===
Outcome	No.	Date	Tournament	Surface	Partner	Opponents	Score
Winner	1.	10 October 1994	ITF Burgdorf, Switzerland	Carpet (i)	(Czech Republic) Lenka Cenková	(Israel) Ilana Berger (Israel) Tzipora Obziler	4–6, 6–3, 6–4
Runner-up	2.	6 May 1996	ITF Szczecin, Poland	Clay	(Czech Republic) Lenka Cenková	(Ukraine) Elena Brioukhovets (Ukraine) Elena Tatarkova	2–6, 1–6
Winner	3.	7 July 1996	ITF Stuttgart, Germany	Clay	(Czech Republic) Lenka Cenková	(Netherlands) Amanda Hopmans (Netherlands) Seda Noorlander	6–2, 3–6, ret.
