= 2000 Wimbledon Championships – Boys' doubles =

Boys' doubles
- 2000 Wimbledon Championships

Final
- Champions: (Belgium) Dominique Coene (Belgium) Kristof Vliegen
- Runners-up: (United Kingdom) Andrew Banks (United Kingdom) Benjamin Riby
- Score: 6–3, 1–6, 6–3

Events
Singles	men	women		boys	girls
Doubles	men	women	mixed	boys	girls
WC Singles	men	women	quad
WC Doubles	men	women	quad
Legends	men	women	seniors
- Wimbledon Championships

Guillermo Coria and David Nalbandian were the defending champions, but they did not compete in the Juniors this year.

Dominique Coene and Kristof Vliegen defeated Andrew Banks and Benjamin Riby in the final, 6–3, 1–6, 6–3 to win the boys' doubles tennis title at the 2000 Wimbledon Championships.

== Seeds ==
The top 5 seeds received a bye into the second round.

1. (United Kingdom) Lee Childs / (United Kingdom) James Nelson (semifinals)
2. (Japan) Hiroki Kondo / (Chinese Taipei) Lu Yen-hsun (second round)
3. (Bulgaria) Todor Enev / (Bulgaria) Radoslav Lukaev (quarterfinals)
4. (Slovakia) Karol Beck / (Czech Republic) Michal Kokta (semifinals)
5. (United States) Tres Davis / (Australia) Adam Kennedy (quarterfinals)
6. (Zimbabwe) Dumiso Khumalo / (South Africa) Raven Klaasen (first round)
7. (Belgium) Dominique Coene / (Belgium) Kristof Vliegen (champions)
8. (Venezuela) Oscar Posada / (Argentina) Cristian Villagrán (first round)

== Draw ==
Key

- Q = Qualifier
- WC = Wild card
- LL = Lucky loser
- Alt = Alternate
- ITF = ITF entry
- PR = Protected ranking
- SR = Special ranking
- SE = Special exempt
- JE = Junior exempt
- JR = Junior Accelerator Programme entrant
- CO = College Accelerator Programme entrant
- NG = Next Gen Accelerator Program entrant
- w/o = Walkover
- r = Retired
- d = Defaulted

=== Finals ===
Semifinals
1	(United Kingdom) Lee Childs (United Kingdom) James Nelson	6	4	3
7	(Belgium) Dominique Coene (Belgium) Kristof Vliegen	1	6	6
4	(Slovakia) Karol Beck (Czech Republic) Michal Kokta	6^{3}	1
(United Kingdom) Andrew Banks (United Kingdom) Benjamin Riby	7^{7}	6

Final
(Belgium) Dominique Coene (Belgium) Kristof Vliegen	6	1	6
(United Kingdom) Andrew Banks (United Kingdom) Benjamin Riby	3	6	3

=== Top half ===
First round
(Australia) Todd Reid (Jamaica) Ryan Russell
(Ukraine) Andriy Dernovskiy (Russia) Philipp Mukhometov	w/o
(New Zealand) Lee Radovanovich (New Zealand) Simon Rea	5	6^{7}
(Norway) Øivind Alver (United States) Matthew Emery	7	7^{9}
(United Kingdom) Richard Bloomfield (United Kingdom) Steven Lockwood	6	2	7
(South Africa) Stephen Mitchell (South Africa) Peter-Jon Nomdo	2	6	5
(Venezuela) Jhonnathan Medina (Switzerland) Roman Valent	3	4
(Croatia) Roko Karanušić (Croatia) Ivan Stelko	6	6
(Colombia) Alejandro Falla (Spain) Daniel Muñoz	6	3	6
7	(Belgium) Dominique Coene (Belgium) Kristof Vliegen	3	6	8

Second round
1	(United Kingdom) Lee Childs (United Kingdom) James Nelson	0	6	6
(Australia) T Reid (Jamaica) R Russell	6	1	4
(Norway) Ø Alver (United States) M Emery	4	4
5	(United States) Tres Davis (Australia) Adam Kennedy	6	6
3	(Bulgaria) Todor Enev (Bulgaria) Radoslav Lukaev	6	6
(United Kingdom) R Bloomfield (United Kingdom) S Lockwood	4	4
(Croatia) R Karanušić (Croatia) I Stelko	6^{4}	6^{3}
7	(Belgium) D Coene (Belgium) K Vliegen	7^{7}	7^{7}

Quarterfinals
1	(United Kingdom) L Childs (United Kingdom) J Nelson	6	6
5	(United States) T Davis (Australia) A Kennedy	3	4
3	(Bulgaria) T Enev (Bulgaria) R Lukaev	3	6	3
7	(Belgium) D Coene (Belgium) K Vliegen	6	3	6

Semifinals
1	(United Kingdom) L Childs (United Kingdom) J Nelson	6	4	3
7	(Belgium) D Coene (Belgium) K Vliegen	1	6	6

=== Bottom half ===
First round
6	(Zimbabwe) Dumiso Khumalo (South Africa) Raven Klaasen	2	7^{7}	3
(Chile) Phillip Harboe (Ecuador) Giovanni Lapentti	6	6^{5}	6
(Switzerland) Stéphane Bohli (Germany) Philipp Marx	7	6
(United Kingdom) Neil Bamford (United Kingdom) Chris Lewis	5	4
(United States) Ytai Abougzir (United States) Hamid Mirzadeh	4	2
(United Kingdom) Tom Pocock (United Kingdom) Matthew Smith	6	6
8	(Venezuela) Oscar Posada (Argentina) Cristian Villagrán	4	2
(United Kingdom) Ian Flanagan (Brazil) Bruno Soares	6	6
(Poland) Łukasz Kubot (Armenia) Harutyun Sofyan	6	3	8
(Mexico) Jacobo Hernández (Benin) Arnaud Segodo	2	6	6
(United Kingdom) Andrew Banks (United Kingdom) Benjamin Riby	6	6
(United States) Prakash Amritraj (Chinese Taipei) Jimmy Wang	4	4

Second round
(Chile) P Harboe (Ecuador) G Lapentti	6^{8}	6^{3}
(Switzerland) S Bohli (Germany) P Marx	7^{10}	7^{7}
(United Kingdom) T Pocock (United Kingdom) M Smith	0	3
4	(Slovakia) Karol Beck (Czech Republic) Michal Kokta	6	6
(United Kingdom) I Flanagan (Brazil) B Soares	w/o
(Poland) Ł Kubot (Armenia) H Sofyan
(United Kingdom) A Banks (United Kingdom) B Riby	6	6
2	(Japan) Hiroki Kondo (Chinese Taipei) Lu Yen-hsun	2	4

Quarterfinals
(Switzerland) S Bohli (Germany) P Marx	2	3
4	(Slovakia) K Beck (Czech Republic) M Kokta	6	6
(Poland) Ł Kubot (Armenia) H Sofyan	w/o
(United Kingdom) A Banks (United Kingdom) B Riby

Semifinals
4	(Slovakia) K Beck (Czech Republic) M Kokta	6^{3}	1
(United Kingdom) A Banks (United Kingdom) B Riby	7^{7}	6
