= 2000 Wimbledon Championships – Boys' singles =

Boys' singles
- 2000 Wimbledon Championships

Final
- Champion: (France) Nicolas Mahut
- Runner-up: (Croatia) Mario Ančić
- Score: 3–6, 6–3, 7–5

Details
- Draw: 64 (8Q / 8WC)
- Seeds: 16

Events
Singles	men	women		boys	girls
Doubles	men	women	mixed	boys	girls
WC Singles	men	women	quad
WC Doubles	men	women	quad
Legends	men	women	seniors
- Wimbledon Championships

Jürgen Melzer was the defending champion, but did not complete in the Juniors this year.

Nicolas Mahut defeated Mario Ančić in the final, 3–6, 6–3, 7–5 to win the boys' singles tennis title at the 2000 Wimbledon Championships.

== Seeds ==
1. (France) Nicolas Mahut (champion)
2. (Bulgaria) Todor Enev (semifinals)
3. (Sweden) Joachim Johansson (second round)
4. (Croatia) Mario Ančić (final)
5. (Slovenia) Andrej Kračman (quarterfinals)
6. (Romania) Adrian Cruciat (first round)
7. (Germany) Maximilian Abel (first round)
8. (Ukraine) Andriy Dernovskiy (second round)
9. (Switzerland) Roman Valent (third round)
10. (Chinese Taipei) Lu Yen-hsun (first round)
11. (Colombia) Alejandro Falla (second round)
12. (Czech Republic) Michal Kokta (third round)
13. (Federal Republic of Yugoslavia) Janko Tipsarević (first round)
14. (Brazil) Bruno Soares (first round)
15. (Argentina) Cristian Villagrán (third round)
16. (Belgium) Kristof Vliegen (quarterfinals)

Click on the seed number of a player to go to their draw section.

== Draw ==
Key

- Q = Qualifier
- WC = Wild card
- LL = Lucky loser
- Alt = Alternate
- ITF = ITF entry
- PR = Protected ranking
- SR = Special ranking
- SE = Special exempt
- JE = Junior exempt
- JR = Junior Accelerator Programme entrant
- CO = College Accelerator Programme entrant
- NG = Next Gen Accelerator Program entrant
- w/o = Walkover
- r = Retired
- d = Defaulted

=== Finals ===
Quarterfinals
1	(France) Nicolas Mahut	7^{10}	6
(Slovakia) Karol Beck	6^{8}	5
(Bulgaria) Radoslav Lukaev	6	3	6
(Poland) Łukasz Kubot	4	6	1
16	(Belgium) Kristof Vliegen	4	3
4	(Croatia) Mario Ančić	6	6
5	(Slovenia) Andrej Kračman	1	6	4
2	(Bulgaria) Todor Enev	6	4	6

Semifinals
1	(France) Nicolas Mahut	7^{8}	7^{7}
(Bulgaria) Radoslav Lukaev	6^{6}	6^{2}
4	(Croatia) Mario Ančić	6	6
2	(Bulgaria) Todor Enev	3	3

Final
1	(France) Nicolas Mahut	3	6	7
4	(Croatia) Mario Ančić	6	3	5

=== Top half ===
==== Section 1 ====
First round
1	(France) Nicolas Mahut	6	6
(Austria) Stefan Wiespeiner	1	1
(France) Julien Maigret	6^{2}	2
(Venezuela) Óscar Posada	7^{7}	6
(New Zealand) Simon Rea	6	0	6
WC	(South Africa) Stephen Mitchell	4	6	1
WC	(United Kingdom) Tom Pocock	6	4	7
13	(Federal Republic of Yugoslavia) Janko Tipsarević	4	6	5
9	(Switzerland) Roman Valent	6	6
(Belgium) Dominique Coene	4	3
(Spain) Daniel Muñoz de la Nava	7	6
Q	(United Kingdom) Richard Bloomfield	5	1
(Croatia) Ante Matijević	0^{r}
(Slovakia) Karol Beck	3
WC	(United Kingdom) James Nelson	7	7^{7}
7	(Germany) Maximilian Abel	5	6^{6}

Second round
1	(France) N Mahut	6	6
(Venezuela) Ó Posada	3	3
(New Zealand) S Rea	6	6
WC	(United Kingdom) T Pocock	3	4
9	(Switzerland) R Valent	6	7
(Spain) D Muñoz de la Nava	2	5
(Slovakia) K Beck	6	6
(United Kingdom) J Nelson	4	3

Third round
1	(France) N Mahut	6	6
(New Zealand) S Rea	2	3
9	(Switzerland) R Valent	4	6^{9}
(Slovakia) K Beck	6	7^{11}

Quarterfinals
1	(France) N Mahut	7^{10}	6
(Slovakia) K Beck	6^{8}	5

==== Section 2 ====
First round
3	(Sweden) Joachim Johansson	6	6^{7}
(Australia) Adam Kennedy	4	6^{4}
(Germany) Simon Stadler	1	4
(Bulgaria) Radoslav Lukaev	6	6
(Chinese Taipei) Wang Yeu-tzuoo	6	7
LL	(Venezuela) Giancarlo Capuccio	3	5
WC	(United Kingdom) Andrew Banks	2	7	12
14	(Brazil) Bruno Soares	6	5	10
11	(Colombia) Alejandro Falla	2	7	6
(United States) Matthew Emery	6	5	1
Q	(Lithuania) Aivaras Balžekas	6	6
(Armenia) Harutyun Sofyan	2	3
(Poland) Łukasz Kubot	7^{7}	2	8
Q	(South Africa) Raven Klaasen	6^{5}	6	6
(Russia) Philipp Mukhometov	6^{5}	5
8	(Ukraine) Andriy Dernovskiy	7^{7}	7

Second round
(Sweden) J Johansson	6^{5}	7^{10}	8
(Bulgaria) R Lukaev	7^{7}	6^{8}	10
(Chinese Taipei) Y-t Wang	6^{4}	7^{7}	6
WC	(United Kingdom) A Banks	7^{7}	6^{3}	3
11	(Colombia) A Falla	3	3
Q	(Lithuania) A Balžekas	6	6
(Poland) L Kubot	6	6
(Ukraine) A Dernovskiy	3	4

Third round
(Bulgaria) R Lukaev	6	4	6
(Chinese Taipei) Y-t Wang	3	6	4
Q	(Lithuania) A Balžekas	4	6	2
(Poland) L Kubot	6	4	6

Quarterfinals
(Bulgaria) R Lukaev	6	3	6
(Poland) L Kubot	4	6	1

=== Bottom half ===
==== Section 3 ====
First round
6	(Romania) Adrian Cruciat	2	1
WC	(United Kingdom) Lee Childs	6	6
Q	(United States) Hamid Mirzadeh	7	6
(Venezuela) Jhonnathan Medina	5	2
(Croatia) Ivan Stelko	6	6
(United States) Ytai Abougzir	4	4
(Norway) Øivind Alver	5	3
16	(Belgium) Kristof Vliegen	7	6
12	(Czech Republic) Michal Kokta	7	6
(South Africa) Peter-Jon Nomdo	5	2
LL	(Jamaica) Ryan Russell	1	5
Q	(Ecuador) Giovanni Lapentti	6	7
(Japan) Hiroki Kondo	6	5	6
(Germany) Philipp Marx	3	7	8
WC	(Switzerland) Stéphane Bohli	3	1
4	(Croatia) Mario Ančić	6	6

Second round
WC	(United Kingdom) L Childs	3	6	9
Q	(United States) H Mirzadeh	6	3	7
(Croatia) I Stelko	4	4
16	(Belgium) K Vliegen	6	6
12	(Czech Republic) M Kokta	6	6
Q	(Ecuador) G Lapentti	3	3
(Germany) P Marx	3	4
4	(Croatia) M Ančić	6	6

Third round
WC	(United Kingdom) L Childs	4	6	5
16	(Belgium) K Vliegen	6	3	7
12	(Czech Republic) M Kokta	6^{2}	6	7
4	(Croatia) M Ančić	7^{7}	4	9

Quarterfinals
16	(Belgium) K Vliegen	4	3
4	(Croatia) M Ančić	6	6

==== Section 4 ====
First round
5	(Slovenia) Andrej Kračman	6	6
WC	(United Kingdom) Benjamin Riby	2	1
Q	(Zimbabwe) Dumiso Khumalo	6	4	4
(United States) Tres Davis	4	6	6
(Mexico) Jacobo Hernández	6	4	6
Q	(New Zealand) Lee Radovanovich	4	6	3
(Federal Republic of Yugoslavia) Darko Mađarovski	6^{1}	2
15	(Argentina) Cristian Villagrán	7^{7}	6
10	(Chinese Taipei) Lu Yen-hsun	4	1
WC	(United Kingdom) Matthew Smith	6	6
(Benin) Arnaud Segodo	6	4	1
Q	(United Kingdom) Chris Lewis	2	6	6
(Croatia) Roko Karanušić	6	7^{7}
LL	(Chile) Phillip Harboe	2	6^{2}
(Germany) Bastian Grönefeld	4	2
2	(Bulgaria) Todor Enev	6	6

Second round
5	(Slovenia) A Kračman	6	6
(United States) T Davis	2	1
(Mexico) J Hernández	3	3
15	(Argentina) C Villagrán	6	6
WC	(United Kingdom) M Smith	6	6
Q	(United Kingdom) C Lewis	0	1
(Croatia) R Karanušić	3	1
2	(Bulgaria) T Enev	6	6

Third round
5	(Slovenia) A Kračman	6	6
(Argentina) C Villagrán	3	2
WC	(United Kingdom) M Smith	2	2
2	(Bulgaria) T Enev	6	6

Quarterfinals
5	(Slovenia) A Kračman	1	6	4
2	(Bulgaria) T Enev	6	4	6
