= 2000 Wimbledon Championships – Girls' doubles =

Girls' doubles
- 2000 Wimbledon Championships

Final
- Champions: (Romania) Ioana Gașpar (Ukraine) Tatiana Perebiynis
- Runners-up: (Czech Republic) Dája Bedáňová (Argentina) María Emilia Salerni
- Score: 7–6^{(7-2)}, 6–3

Events
Singles	men	women		boys	girls
Doubles	men	women	mixed	boys	girls
WC Singles	men	women	quad
WC Doubles	men	women	quad
Legends	men	women	seniors
- Wimbledon Championships

Ioana Gașpar and Tatiana Perebiynis defeated the defending champions Dája Bedáňová and María Emilia Salerni in the final, 7–6^{(7–2)}, 6–3 to win the girls' doubles tennis title at the 2000 Wimbledon Championships.

== Seeds ==
1. (Czech Republic) Dája Bedáňová / (Argentina) María Emilia Salerni (final)
2. (Romania) Ioana Gașpar / (Ukraine) Tatiana Perebiynis (champions)
3. (Japan) Maki Arai / (Japan) Kumiko Iijima (first round)
4. (Australia) Samantha Stosur / (Australia) Christina Wheeler (second round)
5. (Netherlands) Ilona Somers / (Netherlands) Laurette van der Knaap (second round)
6. (United States) Bethanie Mattek / (South Africa) Aniela Mojzis (semifinals)
7. (Slovakia) Martina Babáková / (Slovakia) Ľubomíra Kurhajcová (first round)
8. (Argentina) Gisela Dulko / (Italy) Roberta Vinci (quarterfinals)

== Draw ==
Key

- Q = Qualifier
- WC = Wild card
- LL = Lucky loser
- Alt = Alternate
- ITF = ITF entry
- PR = Protected ranking
- SR = Special ranking
- SE = Special exempt
- JE = Junior exempt
- JR = Junior Accelerator Programme entrant
- CO = College Accelerator Programme entrant
- NG = Next Gen Accelerator Program entrant
- w/o = Walkover
- r = Retired
- d = Defaulted

=== Finals ===
Semifinals
1	(Czech Republic) Dája Bedáňová (Argentina) María Emilia Salerni	3	6	6
6	(United States) Bethanie Mattek (South Africa) Aniela Mojzis	6	1	4
(United States) Alyssa Cohen (Mexico) María José López Herrera	3	2
2	(Romania) Ioana Gașpar (Ukraine) Tatiana Perebiynis	6	6

Final
1	(Czech Republic) Dája Bedáňová (Argentina) María Emilia Salerni	6^{2}	3
2	(Romania) Ioana Gașpar (Ukraine) Tatiana Perebiynis	7^{7}	6

=== Top half ===
First round
1	(Czech Republic) Dája Bedáňová (Argentina) María Emilia Salerni	6	4	6
(Hungary) Anikó Kapros (Germany) Rita Tarjan	0	6	2
(Mexico) Zerene Reyes (Mexico) Melissa Torres Sandoval	6	7^{12}
(Belgium) Caroline Maes (Hungary) Tünde Németh	2	6^{10}
(Australia) Nicole Kriz (Indonesia) Angelique Widjaja	7	0	6
(United States) Megan Bradley (United States) Ashley Harkleroad	5	6	3
(United Kingdom) Julia Smith (United Kingdom) Katherine Vymetal	6	7
7	(Slovakia) Martina Babáková (Slovakia) Ľubomíra Kurhajcová	4	5
3	(Japan) Maki Arai (Japan) Kumiko Iijima	3	6	3
(Federal Republic of Yugoslavia) Renata Ljukovčan (Luxembourg) Claudine Schaul	6	3	6
(United Kingdom) Anne Keothavong (United Kingdom) Sarah Wright	5	4
(Australia) Monique Adamczak (Czech Republic) Renata Voráčová	7	6
(Hungary) Boglárka Berecz (Germany) Sabrina Jolk	6	5	6
WC	(United Kingdom) Mhairi Brown (United Kingdom) Heidi Farr	3	7	3
(Slovakia) Lenka Dlhopolcová (Mexico) Lourdes López	4	4
6	(United States) Bethanie Mattek (South Africa) Aniela Mojzis	6	6

Second round
1	(Czech Republic) D Bedáňová (Argentina) ME Salerni	6	6
(Mexico) Z Reyes (Mexico) M Torres Sandoval	0	1
(Australia) N Kriz (Indonesia) A Widjaja	5	3
(United Kingdom) J Smith (United Kingdom) K Vymetal	7	6
(Federal Republic of Yugoslavia) R Ljukovčan (Luxembourg) C Schaul	1	5
(Australia) M Adamczak (Czech Republic) R Voráčová	6	7
(Hungary) B Berecz (Germany) S Jolk	4	7^{8}	3
6	(United States) B Mattek (South Africa) A Mojzis	6	6^{6}	6

Quarterfinals
1	(Czech Republic) D Bedáňová (Argentina) ME Salerni	3	6	6
(United Kingdom) J Smith (United Kingdom) K Vymetal	6	1	2
(Australia) M Adamczak (Czech Republic) R Voráčová	4	3
6	(United States) B Mattek (South Africa) A Mojzis	6	6

Semifinals
1	(Czech Republic) D Bedáňová (Argentina) ME Salerni	3	6	6
6	(United States) B Mattek (South Africa) A Mojzis	6	1	4

=== Bottom half ===
First round
8	(Argentina) Gisela Dulko (Italy) Roberta Vinci	6	6
WC	(United Kingdom) Anna Hawkins (United Kingdom) Emily Webley-Smith	2	1
(Czech Republic) Eva Birnerová (Czech Republic) Petra Cetkovská	6	6^{5}	1
(Ukraine) Yuliya Beygelzimer (Russia) Galina Fokina	4	7^{7}	6
(United States) Alyssa Cohen (Mexico) María José López Herrera	6	6
(United Kingdom) Elena Baltacha (United Kingdom) Cristelle Grier	3	3
(Japan) Mariko Fritz-Krockow (New Zealand) Tracey O'Connor	3	1
4	(Australia) Samantha Stosur (Australia) Christina Wheeler	6	6
5	(Netherlands) Ilona Somers (Netherlands) Laurette van der Knaap	7^{7}	2	6
(United Kingdom) Jane O'Donoghue (United Kingdom) Nicola Trinder	6^{5}	6	4
(Slovenia) Maša Vesenjak (Slovenia) Urška Vesenjak	4	1
(Mexico) E Valdés (Russia) Galina Voskoboeva	6	6
(United Kingdom) Alice Barnes (United Kingdom) Hannah Collin	6	6
(Bulgaria) Maria Penkova (Poland) Monika Schneider	2	1
(Australia) Melissa Dowse (Australia) Jaslyn Hewitt	6	2	0
2	(Romania) Ioana Gașpar (Ukraine) Tatiana Perebiynis	1	6	6

Second round
8	(Argentina) G Dulko (Italy) R Vinci	2	6	6
(Ukraine) Y Beygelzimer (Russia) G Fokina	6	1	2
(United States) A Cohen (Mexico) MJ López Herrera	7	2	6
4	(Australia) S Stosur (Australia) C Wheeler	5	6	4
5	(Netherlands) I Somers (Netherlands) L van der Knaap	3	3
(Mexico) E Valdés (Russia) G Voskoboeva	6	6
(United Kingdom) A Barnes (United Kingdom) H Collin	1	6	4
2	(Romania) I Gașpar (Ukraine) T Perebiynis	6	4	6

Quarterfinals
8	(Argentina) G Dulko (Italy) R Vinci	5^{r}
(United States) A Cohen (Mexico) MJ López Herrera	6
(Mexico) E Valdés (Russia) G Voskoboeva	6	5	2
2	(Romania) I Gașpar (Ukraine) T Perebiynis	4	7	6

Semifinals
(United States) A Cohen (Mexico) MJ López Herrera	3	2
2	(Romania) I Gașpar (Ukraine) T Perebiynis	6	6
