= 2000 Wimbledon Championships – Girls' singles =

Girls' singles
- 2000 Wimbledon Championships

Final
- Champion: (Argentina) María Emilia Salerni
- Runner-up: (Ukraine) Tatiana Perebiynis
- Score: 6–4, 7–5

Details
- Draw: 64 (8 Q / 8 WC )
- Seeds: 16

Events
Singles	men	women		boys	girls
Doubles	men	women	mixed	boys	girls
WC Singles	men	women	quad
WC Doubles	men	women	quad
Legends	men	women	seniors
← 1999 ·	Wimbledon Championships	· 2001 →

The 2000 Junior Championships, Wimbledon 2000 Tournament, took place between June 29 and July 9, 2000 in Great Britain. María Emilia Salerni defeated Tatiana Perebiynis in the final, 6–4, 7–5 to win the girls' singles tennis title at the 2000 Wimbledon Championships. Iroda Tulyaganova was the defending champion but did not complete in the Juniors this year.

== Seeds ==
1. (Czech Republic) Dája Bedáňová (first round)
2. (Ukraine) Tatiana Perebiynis (final)
3. (Armenia) Marie-Gaïané Mikaelian (semifinals)
4. (Argentina) María Emilia Salerni (champion)
5. (Hungary) Anikó Kapros (quarterfinals)
6. (Australia) Christina Wheeler (quarterfinals)
7. (Romania) Ioana Gaspar (semifinals)
8. (United Kingdom) Hannah Collin (third round)
9. (Slovakia) Lenka Dlhopolcová (third round)
10. (Argentina) Gisela Dulko (first round)
11. (Czech Republic) Renata Voráčová (third round)
12. (Czech Republic) Eva Birnerová (first round)
13. (United States) Alyssa Cohen (third round)
14. (Slovakia) Ľubomíra Kurhajcová (second round)
15. (Ukraine) Yuliya Beygelzimer (second round)
16. (Luxembourg) Claudine Schaul (quarterfinals)

Click on the seed number of a player to go to their draw section.

== Draw ==
=== Key ===
- Q = Qualifier
- WC = Wild card
- LL = Lucky loser
- Alt = Alternate
- SE = Special exempt
- PR = Protected ranking
- ITF = ITF entry
- JE = Junior exempt
- w/o = Walkover
- r = Retired
- d = Defaulted
- SR = Special ranking

=== Finals ===
Quarterfinals
(Italy) Roberta Vinci	3	4
7	(Romania) Ioana Gaspar	6	6
4	(Argentina) María Emilia Salerni	4	6	6
5	(Hungary) Anikó Kapros	6	1	2
6	(Australia) Christina Wheeler	4	4
3	(Armenia) Marie-Gaïané Mikaelian	6	6
16	(Luxembourg) Claudine Schaul	4	0
2	(Ukraine) Tatiana Perebiynis	6	6

Semifinals
7	(Romania) Ioana Gaspar	6^{8}	3
4	(Argentina) María Emilia Salerni	7^{10}	6
3	(Armenia) Marie-Gaïané Mikaelian	3	4
2	(Ukraine) Tatiana Perebiynis	6	6

Final
4	(Argentina) María Emilia Salerni	6	7
2	(Ukraine) Tatiana Perebiynis	4	5

=== Top half ===
==== Section 1 ====
First round
1	(Czech Republic) Dája Bedáňová	5	2
(Italy) Roberta Vinci	7	6
WC	(United Kingdom) Julia Smith	6	6^{4}	6
(Mexico) María José López Herrera	3	7^{7}	4
(South Africa) Aniela Mojzis	6	6^{5}	6
WC	(United Kingdom) Katherine Vymetal	1	7^{7}	1
(Japan) Maki Arai	1	3
9	(Slovakia) Lenka Dlhopolcová	6	6
15	(Ukraine) Yuliya Beygelzimer	6	6^{3}	6
LL	(Netherlands) Laurette van der Knaap	0	7^{7}	4
Q	(Croatia) Jelena Pandžić	6	6
(United States) Bethanie Mattek	3	2
WC	(United Kingdom) Alice Barnes	6	7
Q	(United Kingdom) Cristelle Grier	4	5
(Indonesia) Angelique Widjaja	1	3
7	(Romania) Ioana Gaspar	6	6

Second round
(Italy) R Vinci	6	6
WC	(United Kingdom) J Smith	2	1
(South Africa) A Mojzis	1	1
9	(Slovakia) L Dlhopolcová	6	6
15	(Ukraine) Y Beygelzimer	4	2
Q	(Croatia) J Pandžić	6	6
WC	(United Kingdom) A Barnes	3	1
7	(Romania) I Gaspar	6	6

Third round
(Italy) R Vinci	4	6	6
9	(Slovakia) L Dlhopolcová	6	1	3
Q	(Croatia) J Pandžić	6^{4}	5
7	(Romania) I Gaspar	7	7

Quarterfinals
(Italy) R Vinci	3	4
7	(Romania) I Gaspar	6	6

==== Section 2 ====
First round
4	(Argentina) María Emilia Salerni	6	6
(Mexico) Zerene Reyes	3	1
(Germany) Sabrina Jolk	6^{4}	6	3
(Australia) Samantha Stosur	7^{7}	1	6
Q	(Hungary) Boglárka Berecz	6	4	2
(United Kingdom) Jane O'Donoghue	2	6	6
(Federal Republic of Yugoslavia) Renata Ljukovčan	6	4	2
13	(United States) Alyssa Cohen	3	6	6
12	(Czech Republic) Eva Birnerová	6	3	4
WC	(United Kingdom) Anne Keothavong	2	6	6
Q	(Australia) Monique Adamczak	4	1
Q	(United States) Megan Bradley	6	6
(Slovakia) Martina Babáková	1	6	3
(Russia) Galina Fokina	6	4	6
Q	(Australia) Jaslyn Hewitt	1	3
5	(Hungary) Anikó Kapros	6	6

Second round
4	(Argentina) ME Salerni	6	6
(Australia) S Stosur	4	1
(United Kingdom) J O'Donoghue	6	3	4
13	(United States) A Cohen	4	6	6
WC	(United Kingdom) A Keothavong	6	6
Q	(United States) M Bradley	4	3
(Russia) G Fokina	3	5
5	(Hungary) A Kapros	6	7

Third round
4	(Argentina) ME Salerni	6	6
13	(United States) A Cohen	0	4
WC	(United Kingdom) A Keothavong	6	1	2
5	(Hungary) A Kapros	4	6	6

Quarterfinals
4	(Argentina) ME Salerni	4	6	6
5	(Hungary) A Kapros	6	1	2

=== Bottom half ===
==== Section 3 ====
First round
6	(Australia) Christina Wheeler	7^{9}	4	6
WC	(United Kingdom) Heidi Farr	6^{7}	6	2
(Hungary) Tünde Németh	6^{4}	2
(Russia) Galina Voskoboeva	7^{7}	6
(Belgium) Caroline Maes	6	4	4
Q	(Japan) Aiko Nakamura	2	6	6
(Bulgaria) Maria Penkova	3	2
11	(Czech Republic) Renata Voráčová	6	6
10	(Argentina) Gisela Dulko	6	3	7
WC	(United Kingdom) Elena Baltacha	2	6	9
(Mexico) Erika Valdés	4	2
(Slovenia) Urška Vesenjak	6	6
Q	(United Kingdom) Rebecca Llewellyn	1	6	6
(Netherlands) Ilona Somers	6	4	3
(Japan) Kumiko Iijima	1	4
3	(Armenia) Marie-Gaïané Mikaelian	6	6

Second round
6	(Australia) C Wheeler	7^{7}	6
(Russia) G Voskoboeva	6^{3}	2
Q	(Japan) A Nakamura	7^{7}	3	5
11	(Czech Republic) R Voráčová	6^{5}	6	7
WC	(United Kingdom) E Baltacha	6^{5}	6	6
(Slovenia) U Vesenjak	7^{7}	3	4
Q	(United Kingdom) R Llewellyn	0	1
3	(Armenia) M-G Mikaelian	6	6

Third round
6	(Australia) C Wheeler	6	6
11	(Czech Republic) R Voráčová	4	3
WC	(United Kingdom) E Baltacha	3	6	5
3	(Armenia) M-G Mikaelian	6	2	7

Quarterfinals
6	(Australia) C Wheeler	4	4
3	(Armenia) M-G Mikaelian	6	6

==== Section 4 ====
First round
8	(United Kingdom) Hannah Collin	6	6
(Poland) Monika Schneider	0	1
WC	(United States) Ashley Harkleroad	6	6
(Czech Republic) Petra Cetkovská	3	3
(Croatia) Ivana Abramović	6	6
(Germany) Rita Tarjan	2	4
(Norway) Caroline Tidemand	0	0
16	(Luxembourg) Claudine Schaul	6	6
14	(Slovakia) Ľubomíra Kurhajcová	6	6
(New Zealand) Tracey O'Connor	4	3
(Australia) Melissa Dowse	4	6	6
LL	(Australia) Nicole Kriz	6	4	4
(Mexico) Melissa Torres Sandoval	6	6
WC	(United Kingdom) Nicola Trinder	4	1
(Italy) Giorgia Mortello	1	0
2	(Ukraine) Tatiana Perebiynis	6	6

Second round
8	(United Kingdom) H Collin	6	6
WC	(United States) A Harkleroad	3	0
(Croatia) I Abramović	0	6	1
16	(Luxembourg) C Schaul	6	0	6
14	(Slovakia) Ľ Kurhajcová	4	6	2
(Australia) M Dowse	6	3	6
(Mexico) M Torres Sandoval	2	2
2	(Ukraine) T Perebiynis	6	6

Third round
8	(United Kingdom) H Collin	1	1
16	(Luxembourg) C Schaul	6	6
(Australia) M Dowse	2	1
2	(Ukraine) T Perebiynis	6	6

Quarterfinals
16	(Luxembourg) C Schaul	4	0
2	(Ukraine) T Perebiynis	6	6
