= 2000 Wimbledon Championships =

- Date: 26 June – 9 July
- Edition: 114th
- Category: Grand Slam (ITF)
- Draw: 128S/64D/64XD
- Prize money: £8,056,480
- Surface: Grass
- Location: Church Road; SW19, Wimbledon, London, United Kingdom
- Venue: All England Lawn Tennis and Croquet Club

Champions

Men's singles
- (United States) Pete Sampras

Women's singles
- (United States) Venus Williams

Men's doubles
- (Australia) Todd Woodbridge / (Australia) Mark Woodforde

Women's doubles
- (United States) Serena Williams / (United States) Venus Williams

Mixed doubles
- (United States) Donald Johnson / (United States) Kimberly Po

Boys' singles
- (France) Nicolas Mahut

Girls' singles
- (Argentina) María Emilia Salerni

Boys' doubles
- (Belgium) Dominique Coene / (Belgium) Kristof Vliegen

Girls' doubles
- (Romania) Ioana Gașpar / (Ukraine) Tatiana Perebiynis
- Wimbledon Championships

The 2000 Wimbledon Championships was a tennis tournament played on grass courts at the All England Lawn Tennis and Croquet Club in Wimbledon, London in the United Kingdom. It was the 114th edition of the Wimbledon Championships and was held from 26 June to 9 July 2000. It was the third Grand Slam tennis event of the year.

Pete Sampras won his fourth consecutive Wimbledon title, defeating Pat Rafter in the final. It was also his last Wimbledon title. Lindsay Davenport was unsuccessful in her title defence, being defeated by Venus Williams in the women's final. It was the first of five Wimbledon titles for Venus Williams.

== Millennium celebrations ==
In order to celebrate the millennium, the All England Club invited all surviving singles champions, any player that had appeared in two or more singles finals without winning the championship, and any player who had won four or more doubles titles, to a presentation ceremony on Centre Court on Saturday, July 1. Each honouree was presented with a crystal plate, engraved with their name, by the President of the Lawn Tennis Association, Her Royal Highness The Duchess of Gloucester. Those who attended were (in order of presentation): Singles champion Andre Agassi; Doubles champions: Ken McGregor, Bob Hewitt, Ken Fletcher, Tony Roche, Rosie Casals, Owen Davidson, Frew McMillan, Peter Fleming, Pam Shriver, Helena Suková, Natasha Zvereva, Gigi Fernández; Singles finalists: Henry "Bunny" Austin, Kurt Nielsen, Ken Rosewall, Darlene Hard, Fred Stolle, Hana Mandlíková, Goran Ivanišević; Singles champions: Sidney Wood, Pauline Betz, Bob Falkenburg, Ted Schroeder, John "Budge" Patty, Richard "Dick" Savitt, Frank Sedgman, Elias "Vic" Seixas, Jaroslav Drobný, Marion "Tony" Trabert, Shirley Fry Irvin, Ashley Cooper, Maria Bueno, Alejandro "Alex" Olmedo, Neale Fraser, Angela Mortimer, Rod Laver, Margaret Smith Court, Roy Emerson, Billie Jean King, Manuel Santana, John Newcombe, Ann Jones, Evonne Goolagong Cawley, Stan Smith, Jan Kodeš, Chris Evert, Björn Borg, Virginia Wade, Martina Navratilova, John McEnroe, Boris Becker, Patrick "Pat" Cash, Steffi Graf, Stefan Edberg, Michael Stich, Conchita Martínez, Jana Novotná and Lindsay Davenport. Andre Agassi was presented first in order to accommodate his match schedule. Other attendees were then presented with their commemoration later in the same day in the Royal Box: Doubles champions: Mark Woodforde, Todd Woodbridge; Singles finalist: Arantxa Sánchez Vicario; and Singles champions: Martina Hingis and Pete Sampras. Several post war champions were absent, but the only champions from the open era (post 1968) not to attend were Jimmy Connors and Richard Krajicek. Both Ilie Năstase and Ivan Lendl were also invited as two-time singles finalist, but did not attend. The inclusion of singles finalists and the exclusion of doubles champions who had not won at least four titles was mildly controversial, with Frew McMillan bemoaning to BBC Radio that his two-time mixed doubles championship partner Betty Stöve had not been invited, despite the Dutch woman holding three Wimbledon doubles titles and having reached the singles final once; whereas Hana Mandlíková and Goran Ivanišević both attended, neither one of whom had ever won a Wimbledon title of any kind prior to Wimbledon 2000.

== Prize money ==
The total prize money for 2000 championships was £8,056,480. The winner of the men's title earned £477,500 while the women's singles champion earned £430,000.

Event	W	F	SF	QF	Round of 16	Round of 32	Round of 64	Round of 128
Men's singles	£477,500	£238,750	£119,380	£62,080	£33,420	£19,330	£11,700	£7,160
Women's singles	£430,000	£215,000	£101,470	£52,760	£28,410	£15,460	£9,360	£5,730
Men's doubles *	£195,630							—N/a
Women's doubles *	£176,070							—N/a
Mixed doubles *	£83,100							—N/a

_{* per team}

== Champions ==
=== Seniors ===
==== Men's singles ====
(United States) Pete Sampras defeated (Australia) Patrick Rafter, 6–7^{(10-12)}, 7–6^{(7-5)}, 6–4, 6–2

- It was Sampras's 2nd title of the year, and his 63rd overall. It was his 13th career Grand Slam title (a record until Roger Federer surpassed him in 2009), and his 7th (and last) Wimbledon title (a record, tied with William Renshaw, and subsequently surpassed by Federer in 2017)

==== Women's singles ====
(United States) Venus Williams defeated (United States) Lindsay Davenport, 6–3, 7–6^{(7-3)}

- It was Williams's 1st title of the year, and her 10th overall. It was her 1st career Grand Slam title.

==== Men's doubles ====
(Australia) Todd Woodbridge / (Australia) Mark Woodforde defeated (Netherlands) Paul Haarhuis / (Australia) Sandon Stolle, 6–3, 6–4, 6–1

==== Women's doubles ====
(United States) Serena Williams / (United States) Venus Williams defeated (France) Julie Halard-Decugis / (Japan) Ai Sugiyama, 6–3, 6–2

==== Mixed doubles ====
(United States) Donald Johnson / (United States) Kimberly Po defeated (Australia) Lleyton Hewitt / (Belgium) Kim Clijsters, 6–4, 7–6^{(7-3)}

=== Juniors ===
==== Boys' singles ====
(France) Nicolas Mahut defeated (Croatia) Mario Ančić, 3–6, 6–3, 7–5

==== Girls' singles ====
(Argentina) María Emilia Salerni defeated (Ukraine) Tatiana Perebiynis, 6–4, 7–5

==== Boys' doubles ====
(Belgium) Dominique Coene / (Belgium) Kristof Vliegen defeated (United Kingdom) Andrew Banks / (United Kingdom) Benjamin Riby, 6–3, 1–6, 6–3

==== Girls' doubles ====
(Romania) Ioana Gașpar / (Ukraine) Tatiana Perebiynis defeated (Czech Republic) Dája Bedáňová / (Argentina) María Emilia Salerni, 7–6^{(7-2)}, 6–3

== Singles players ==
Men's singles

Champion		Runner-up	
(United States) Pete Sampras (1)		(Australia) Pat Rafter (12)	
Semifinals out
(Belarus) Vladimir Voltchkov (Q)		(United States) Andre Agassi (2)	
Quarterfinals out
(United States) Jan-Michael Gambill	(Zimbabwe) Byron Black	(Germany) Alexander Popp	(Australia) Mark Philippoussis (10)
4th round out
(Sweden) Jonas Björkman	(Sweden) Thomas Enqvist (9)	(Italy) Gianluca Pozzi	(South Africa) Wayne Ferreira
(Sweden) Thomas Johansson	(Switzerland) Marc Rosset	(United Kingdom) Tim Henman (8)	(Germany) David Prinosil (Q)
3rd round out
(United States) Justin Gimelstob	(South Africa) Neville Godwin (Q)	(Germany) Christian Vinck (Q)	(United States) Paul Goldstein
(Belgium) Olivier Rochus (Q)	(Spain) Albert Portas	(Romania) Andrei Pavel	(Morocco) Younes El Aynaoui
(Sweden) Magnus Gustafsson	(Germany) Rainer Schüttler	(Germany) Tommy Haas	(Brazil) Gustavo Kuerten (4)
(Morocco) Hicham Arazi	(Netherlands) Sjeng Schalken	(Czech Republic) Martin Damm	(France) Jérôme Golmard
2nd round out
(Slovakia) Karol Kučera	(France) Michaël Llodra (Q)	(Spain) Alberto Martín	(Czech Republic) Ctislav Doseděl
(Spain) Francisco Clavet	(Israel) Harel Levy (Q)	(United States) Jeff Tarango	(France) Fabrice Santoro
(Sweden) Magnus Norman (3)	(United States) Alex O'Brien (Q)	(Slovakia) Dominik Hrbatý	(United States) Vince Spadea
(Netherlands) Richard Krajicek (11)	(Canada) Daniel Nestor (PR)	(United Kingdom) Martin Lee (WC)	(France) Cédric Pioline (6)
(Russia) Yevgeny Kafelnikov (5)	(Belarus) Max Mirnyi	(France) Nicolas Escudé	(Australia) Todd Woodbridge (WC)
(Sweden) Andreas Vinciguerra	(United Kingdom) Arvind Parmar (WC)	(United States) Michael Chang	(South Africa) Justin Bower (Q)
(France) Arnaud Clément	(Canada) Sébastien Lareau (LL)	(Belgium) Christophe Rochus	(France) Arnaud Di Pasquale
(Russia) Marat Safin (15)	(France) Stéphane Huet (Q)	(Austria) Stefan Koubek	(United States) Todd Martin
1st round out
(Czech Republic) Jiří Vaněk	(Zimbabwe) Wayne Black (LL)	(Morocco) Karim Alami	(United Kingdom) Barry Cowan (WC)
(Austria) Werner Eschauer (LL)	(Spain) Fernando Vicente	(Ukraine) Andriy Medvedev	(Ecuador) Nicolás Lapentti (16)
(Germany) Markus Hantschk	(Argentina) Hernán Gumy	(Australia) Jason Stoltenberg	(Chile) Nicolás Massú
(France) Julien Boutter	(France) Sébastien Grosjean	(Italy) Andrea Gaudenzi	(Australia) Lleyton Hewitt (7)
(Australia) Mark Woodforde (WC)	(Australia) Richard Fromberg	(Czech Republic) Jiří Novák	(Croatia) Ivan Ljubičić
(Argentina) Mariano Zabaleta	(Australia) Andrew Ilie	(Czech Republic) Tomáš Zíb	(United Kingdom) Greg Rusedski (14)
(Germany) Michael Kohlmann (LL)	(Australia) Wayne Arthurs	(Spain) Alberto Berasategui	(United Kingdom) Miles Maclagan (WC)
(Costa Rica) Juan Antonio Marín	(Spain) Félix Mantilla	(Argentina) Juan Ignacio Chela	(Norway) Christian Ruud
(Switzerland) Roger Federer	(Brazil) Fernando Meligeni	(Australia) Paul Kilderry (Q)	(Czech Republic) Bohdan Ulihrach
(Spain) Carlos Moyá	(Argentina) Guillermo Cañas	(Netherlands) Jan Siemerink	(United Kingdom) Jamie Delgado (WC)
(Germany) Nicolas Kiefer (13)	(Italy) Laurence Tieleman	(Argentina) Franco Squillari	(Brazil) André Sá
(Haiti) Ronald Agénor	(Argentina) Gastón Gaudio	(Italy) Davide Sanguinetti	(United States) Chris Woodruff
(Thailand) Paradorn Srichaphan	(Croatia) Goran Ivanišević	(Italy) Igor Gaudi (Q)	(United States) Michael Russell (Q)
(Switzerland) George Bastl	(Sweden) Mikael Tillström	(Austria) Markus Hipfl	(Austria) Jürgen Melzer (Q)
(Spain) Galo Blanco	(Australia) Dejan Petrovic (Q)	(Armenia) Sargis Sargsian	(India) Mahesh Bhupathi (WC)
(France) Cyril Saulnier (LL)	(Romania) Adrian Voinea	(Sweden) Fredrik Jonsson (LL)	(United States) Taylor Dent (Q)

Women's singles

Champion		Runner-up	
(United States) Venus Williams (5)		(United States) Lindsay Davenport (2)	
Semifinals out
(United States) Serena Williams (8)		(Australia) Jelena Dokic	
Quarterfinals out
(Switzerland) Martina Hingis (1)	(United States) Lisa Raymond	(Spain) Magüi Serna	(United States) Monica Seles
4th round out
(Germany) Anke Huber (11)	(Belgium) Sabine Appelmans	(Belarus) Olga Barabanschikova	(Thailand) Tamarine Tanasugarn
(United States) Kristina Brandi	(United States) Lilia Osterloh	(Spain) Arantxa Sánchez Vicario (9)	(United States) Jennifer Capriati
3rd round out
(Croatia) Silvija Talaja	(Slovenia) Tina Pisnik	(Israel) Anna Smashnova	(France) Nathalie Dechy
(Canada) Sonya Jeyaseelan	(United States) Amy Frazier	(France) Anne-Gaëlle Sidot	(Spain) Cristina Torrens Valero
(Russia) Anastasia Myskina	(United States) Brie Rippner (Q)	(Austria) Patricia Wartusch	(Netherlands) Miriam Oremans
(France) Sarah Pitkowski	(Federal Republic of Yugoslavia) Sandra Načuk	(Indonesia) Yayuk Basuki (PR)	(Argentina) Paola Suárez
2nd round out
(China) Yi Jing-Qian	(Croatia) Mirjana Lučić	(Bulgaria) Lubomira Bacheva	(United Kingdom) Louise Latimer (WC)
(Netherlands) Kristie Boogert	(Hungary) Katalin Marosi-Aracama	(Zimbabwe) Cara Black	(Japan) Ai Sugiyama
(Spain) Conchita Martínez (4)	(Germany) Jana Kandarr	(United States) Lisa Raymond	(Russia) Nadia Petrova
(Russia) Anna Kournikova	(Belarus) Natasha Zvereva	(Poland) Magdalena Grzybowska (Q)	(Netherlands) Yvette Basting (Q)
(Belgium) Kim Clijsters	(Argentina) Florencia Labat	(Japan) Shinobu Asagoe (Q)	(Spain) Gala León García
(South Africa) Amanda Coetzer (12)	(United States) Alexandra Stevenson	(Bulgaria) Magdalena Maleeva	(France) Mary Pierce (3)
(Belgium) Els Callens	(Romania) Cătălina Cristea	(United Kingdom) Lucie Ahl (WC)	(Italy) Rita Grande
(United States) Meghann Shaughnessy	(Germany) Marlene Weingärtner	(Switzerland) Patty Schnyder	(Russia) Elena Likhovtseva
1st round out
(Spain) Ángeles Montolio	(Italy) Giulia Casoni (Q)	(Czech Republic) Denisa Chládková	(Romania) Irina Spîrlea
(Canada) Maureen Drake	(United Kingdom) Hannah Collin (WC)	(United States) Holly Parkinson	(United Kingdom) Joanne Ward (WC)
(France) Julie Halard-Decugis (14)	(Romania) Ruxandra Dragomir	(Russia) Alina Jidkova	(Hungary) Petra Mandula
(United Kingdom) Sam Smith (WC)	(United States) Chanda Rubin	(Japan) Yuka Yoshida (Q)	(Czech Republic) Květa Hrdličková
(Luxembourg) Anne Kremer	(United States) Erika deLone	(Slovakia) Henrieta Nagyová	(Canada) Jana Nejedly
(United Kingdom) Lorna Woodroffe (WC)	(Czech Republic) Sandra Kleinová	(Russia) Elena Dementieva	(Austria) Barbara Schett (15)
(France) Sandrine Testud (10)	(Czech Republic) Dája Bedáňová (Q)	(United Kingdom) Julie Pullin (WC)	(Paraguay) Rossana de los Ríos (Q)
(Netherlands) Seda Noorlander	(Netherlands) Amanda Hopmans	(Czech Republic) Adriana Gerši	(Sweden) Åsa Carlsson
(France) Nathalie Tauziat (7)	(Belgium) Laurence Courtois	(South Africa) Joannette Kruger	(Belarus) Nadejda Ostrovskaya
(South Africa) Mariaan de Swardt	(United States) Tara Snyder	(Germany) Gréta Arn (Q)	(France) Amélie Mauresmo (13)
(United States) Mashona Washington (Q)	(Italy) Silvia Farina	(Hungary) Rita Kuti-Kis	(Slovenia) Katarina Srebotnik
(France) Amélie Cocheteux	(Russia) Lina Krasnoroutskaya (Q)	(United Kingdom) Karen Cross (WC)	(Australia) Nicole Pratt
(Slovakia) Karina Habšudová	(Venezuela) María Vento	(Germany) Barbara Rittner	(Russia) Tatiana Panova
(Croatia) Jelena Kostanić	(Austria) Barbara Schwartz	(Austria) Melanie Schnell (Q)	(Belgium) Justine Henin
(Belgium) Dominique Van Roost (16)	(Spain) María Sánchez Lorenzo	(Austria) Sylvia Plischke	(United States) Marissa Irvin
(Switzerland) Emmanuelle Gagliardi	(Italy) Tathiana Garbin	(Switzerland) Miroslava Vavrinec	(United States) Corina Morariu

== Singles seeds ==
=== Men's singles ===
1. (United States) Pete Sampras (champion)
2. (United States) Andre Agassi (semifinals, lost to Pat Rafter)
3. (Sweden) Magnus Norman (second round, lost to Olivier Rochus)
4. (Brazil) Gustavo Kuerten (third round, lost to Alexander Popp)
5. (Russia) Yevgeny Kafelnikov (second round, lost to Thomas Johansson)
6. (France) Cédric Pioline (second round, lost to Vladimir Voltchkov)
7. (Australia) Lleyton Hewitt (first round, lost to Jan-Michael Gambill)
8. (United Kingdom) Tim Henman (fourth round, lost to Mark Philippoussis)
9. (Sweden) Thomas Enqvist (fourth round, lost to Jan-Michael Gambill)
10. (Australia) Mark Philippoussis (quarterfinals, lost to Andre Agassi)
11. (Netherlands) Richard Krajicek (second round, lost to Wayne Ferreira)
12. (Australia) Patrick Rafter (final, lost to Pete Sampras)
13. (Germany) Nicolas Kiefer (first round, lost to Tommy Haas)
14. (United Kingdom) Greg Rusedski (first round, lost to Vince Spadea)
15. (Russia) Marat Safin (second round, lost to Martin Damm)
16. (Ecuador) Nicolás Lapentti (first round, lost to Ctislav Doseděl)

=== Women's singles ===
1. (Switzerland) Martina Hingis (quarterfinals, lost to Venus Williams)
2. (United States) Lindsay Davenport (final, lost to Venus Williams)
3. (France) Mary Pierce (second round, lost to Magüi Serna)
4. (Spain) Conchita Martínez (second round, lost to Sonya Jeyaseelan)
5. (United States) Venus Williams (champion)
6. (United States) Monica Seles (quarterfinals, lost to Lindsay Davenport)
7. (France) Nathalie Tauziat (first round, lost to Kim Clijsters)
8. (United States) Serena Williams (semifinals, lost to Venus Williams)
9. (Spain) Arantxa Sánchez Vicario (fourth round, lost to Monica Seles)
10. (France) Sandrine Testud (first round, lost to Anna Kournikova)
11. (Germany) Anke Huber (fourth round, lost to Martina Hingis)
12. (South Africa) Amanda Coetzer (second round, lost to Lilia Osterloh)
13. (France) Amélie Mauresmo (first round, lost to Gala León García)
14. (France) Julie Halard-Decugis (first round, lost to Kristie Boogert)
15. (Austria) Barbara Schett (first round, lost to Olga Barabanschikova)
16. (Belgium) Dominique Van Roost (first round, lost to Jennifer Capriati)

Preceded by 2000 French Open	Grand Slams	Succeeded by 2000 US Open
