= 2000 Wimbledon Championships – Women's singles =

Women's singles
- 2000 Wimbledon Championships

Final
- Champion: (United States) Venus Williams
- Runner-up: (United States) Lindsay Davenport
- Score: 6–3, 7–6^{(7–3)}

Details
- Draw: 128 (12 Q / 8 WC )
- Seeds: 16

Events
Singles	men	women		boys	girls
Doubles	men	women	mixed	boys	girls
WC Singles	men	women	quad
WC Doubles	men	women	quad
Legends	men	women	seniors
← 1999 ·	Wimbledon Championships	· 2001 →

Venus Williams defeated defending champion Lindsay Davenport in the final, 6–3, 7–6^{(7–3)} to win the ladies' singles tennis title at the 2000 Wimbledon Championships. It was her first major singles title, and the first of an eventual five Wimbledon singles titles. Williams was the first Black and African American woman to win the title since Althea Gibson in 1958.

== Seeds ==
1. (Switzerland) Martina Hingis (quarterfinals)
2. (United States) Lindsay Davenport (final)
3. (France) Mary Pierce (second round)
4. (Spain) Conchita Martínez (second round)
5. (United States) Venus Williams (champion)
6. (United States) Monica Seles (quarterfinals)
7. (France) Nathalie Tauziat (first round)
8. (United States) Serena Williams (semifinals)

9. (Spain) Arantxa Sánchez Vicario (fourth round)
10. (France) Sandrine Testud (first round)
11. (Germany) Anke Huber (fourth round)
12. (South Africa) Amanda Coetzer (second round)
13. (France) Amélie Mauresmo (first round)
14. (France) Julie Halard-Decugis (first round)
15. (Austria) Barbara Schett (first round)
16. (Belgium) Dominique Van Roost (first round)

Click on the seed number of a player to go to their draw section.

== Draw ==
=== Key ===
- Q = Qualifier
- WC = Wild card
- LL = Lucky loser
- Alt = Alternate
- ITF = ITF entry
- PR = Protected ranking
- SR = Special ranking
- SE = Special exempt
- JE = Junior exempt
- JR = Junior Accelerator Programme entrant
- CO = College Accelerator Programme entrant
- NG = Next Gen Accelerator Program entrant
- w/o = Walkover
- r = Retired
- d = Defaulted

=== Finals ===
Quarterfinals
1	(Switzerland) Martina Hingis	3	6	4
5	(United States) Venus Williams	6	4	6
(United States) Lisa Raymond	2	0
8	(United States) Serena Williams	6	6
(Australia) Jelena Dokic	6	6
(Spain) Magüi Serna	3	2
6	(United States) Monica Seles	7^{7}	4	0
2	(United States) Lindsay Davenport	6^{4}	6	6

Semifinals
5	(United States) Venus Williams	6	7^{7}
8	(United States) Serena Williams	2	6^{3}
(Australia) Jelena Dokic	4	2
2	(United States) Lindsay Davenport	6	6

Final
5	(United States) Venus Williams	6	7^{7}
2	(United States) Lindsay Davenport	3	6^{3}

=== Top half ===
==== Section 1 ====
First round
1	(Switzerland) M Hingis	6	6
(Spain) Á Montolio	1	2
(China) J-Q Yi	6	6
Q	(Italy) G Casoni	2	1
(Croatia) M Lučić	4	6	6
(Czech Republic) D Chládková	6	2	2
(Romania) I Spîrlea	4	2
(Croatia) S Talaja	6	6
(Canada) M Drake	2	6^{6}
(Bulgaria) L Bacheva	6	7^{8}
(Slovenia) T Pisnik	6	7
WC	(United Kingdom) H Collin	1	5
(United States) H Parkinson	6	3	4
WC	(United Kingdom) L Latimer	3	6	6
WC	(United Kingdom) J Ward	5	2
11	(Germany) A Huber	7	6

Second round
1	(Switzerland) M Hingis	6	6
(China) J-Q Yi	4	1
(Croatia) M Lučić	2	2
(Croatia) S Talaja	6	6
(Bulgaria) L Bacheva	2	1
(Slovenia) T Pisnik	6	6
WC	(United Kingdom) L Latimer	7	3	3
11	(Germany) A Huber	5	6	6

Third round
1	(Switzerland) M Hingis	6	6
(Croatia) S Talaja	2	2
(Slovenia) T Pisnik	2	3
11	(Germany) A Huber	6	6

Fourth round
1	(Switzerland) M Hingis	6	6
11	(Germany) A Huber	1	2

==== Section 2 ====
First round
14	(France) J Halard-Decugis	6^{4}	6	1
(Netherlands) K Boogert	7^{7}	0	6
(Belgium) S Appelmans	7^{7}	6
(Romania) R Dragomir	6^{4}	4
(Russia) A Jidkova	6	1	2
(Hungary) K Marosi-Aracama	3	6	6
(Hungary) P Mandula	2	6^{4}
(Israel) A Smashnova	6	7^{7}
(Zimbabwe) C Black	6	6
WC	(United Kingdom) S Smith	2	2
(France) N Dechy	6	6
(United States) C Rubin	3	1
(Japan) A Sugiyama	6	6
Q	(Japan) Y Yoshida	1	3
(Czech Republic) K Hrdličková	3	1
5	(United States) V Williams	6	6

Second round
(Netherlands) K Boogert	5	6	7
(Belgium) S Appelmans	7	3	9
(Hungary) K Marosi-Aracama	2	7	2
(Israel) A Smashnova	6	5	6
(Zimbabwe) C Black	6	2	1
(France) N Dechy	4	6	6
(Japan) A Sugiyama	1	4
5	(United States) V Williams	6	6

Third round
(Belgium) S Appelmans	6	6
(Israel) A Smashnova	3	4
(France) N Dechy	0	6^{4}
5	(United States) V Williams	6	7^{7}

Fourth round
(Belgium) S Appelmans	4	4
5	(United States) V Williams	6	6

==== Section 3 ====
First round
4	(Spain) C Martínez	6	7^{7}
(Luxembourg) A Kremer	3	6^{5}
(Canada) S Jeyaseelan	6	6
(United States) E deLone	4	4
(Slovakia) H Nagyová	4	2
(Germany) J Kandarr	6	6
(Canada) J Nejedly	1	6	2
(United States) L Raymond	6	4	6
(United States) A Frazier	6	7^{7}
WC	(United Kingdom) L Woodroffe	4	6^{4}
(Czech Republic) S Kleinová	6	2	2
(Australia) A Molik	3	6	6
(Russia) N Petrova	6	6
(Russia) E Dementieva	1	1
(Belarus) O Barabanschikova	6	6
15	(Austria) B Schett	2	2

Second round
4	(Spain) C Martínez	4	1
(Canada) S Jeyaseelan	6	6
(Germany) J Kandarr	2	1
(United States) L Raymond	6	6
(United States) A Frazier	4	7	6
(Australia) A Molik	6	5	4
(Russia) N Petrova	4	6	4
(Belarus) O Barabanschikova	6	2	6

Third round
(Canada) S Jeyaseelan	2	1
(United States) L Raymond	6	6
(United States) A Frazier	3	2
(Belarus) O Barabanschikova	6	6

Fourth round
(United States) L Raymond	6	6
(Belarus) O Barabanschikova	4	2

==== Section 4 ====
First round
10	(France) S Testud	5	7	4
(Russia) A Kournikova	7	5	6
Q	(Czech Republic) D Bedáňová	3	1
(France) A-G Sidot	6	6
(Belarus) N Zvereva	6	6
WC	(United Kingdom) J Pullin	4	3
(Thailand) T Tanasugarn	7	6
Q	(Paraguay) R de los Ríos	5	2
(Netherlands) S Noorlander	6	4	6
(Spain) C Torrens Valero	0	6	8
(Netherlands) A Hopmans	6^{8}	2
Q	(Poland) M Grzybowska	7^{10}	6
Q	(Netherlands) Y Basting	6	6
(Czech Republic) A Gerši	1	4
(Sweden) Å Carlsson	3	2
8	(United States) S Williams	6	6

Second round
(Russia) A Kournikova	3	4
(France) A-G Sidot	6	6
(Belarus) N Zvereva	1	3
(Thailand) T Tanasugarn	6	6
(Spain) C Torrens Valero	7^{8}	7
Q	(Poland) M Grzybowska	6^{6}	5
Q	(Netherlands) Y Basting	1	0
8	(United States) S Williams	6	6

Third round
(France) A-G Sidot	1	6	4
(Thailand) T Tanasugarn	6	4	6
(Spain) C Torrens Valero	2	1
8	(United States) S Williams	6	6

Fourth round
(Thailand) T Tanasugarn	1	1
8	(United States) S Williams	6	6

=== Bottom half ===
==== Section 5 ====
First round
7	(France) N Tauziat	3	6	2
(Belgium) K Clijsters	6	3	6
(Belgium) L Courtois	4	7	2
(Russia) A Myskina	6	5	6
(South Africa) J Kruger	3	5
(United States) K Brandi	6	7
(Belarus) N Ostrovskaya	3	6	4
(Argentina) F Labat	6	2	6
(South Africa) M de Swardt	2	3
Q	(United States) B Rippner	6	6
Q	(Japan) S Asagoe	6	1	6
(United States) T Snyder	2	6	1
(Australia) J Dokic	6	7^{9}
Q	(Germany) G Arn	1	6^{7}
(Spain) G León García	4	6	7
13	(France) A Mauresmo	6	3	5

Second round
(Belgium) K Clijsters	4	2
(Russia) A Myskina	6	6
(United States) K Brandi	6	2	6
(Argentina) F Labat	2	6	1
Q	(United States) B Rippner	6	6
Q	(Japan) S Asagoe	1	2
(Australia) J Dokic	7^{7}	6
(Spain) G León García	6^{5}	1

Third round
(Russia) A Myskina	6	3	1
(United States) K Brandi	4	6	6
Q	(United States) B Rippner	2	1
(Australia) J Dokic	6	6

Fourth round
(United States) K Brandi	1	3
(Australia) J Dokic	6	6

==== Section 6 ====
First round
12	(South Africa) A Coetzer	6	6
Q	(United States) M Washington	4	2
(United States) L Osterloh	6	5	6
(Italy) S Farina	3	7	3
(Hungary) R Kuti-Kis	5	6^{3}
(United States) A Stevenson	7	7^{7}
(Austria) P Wartusch	7	6
(Slovenia) K Srebotnik	5	4
(France) A Cocheteux	1	2
(Bulgaria) M Maleeva	6	6
Q	(Russia) L Krasnoroutskaya	7^{7}	4	3
(Netherlands) M Oremans	6^{5}	6	6
(Spain) M Serna	6	6
WC	(United Kingdom) K Cross	3	4
(Australia) N Pratt	1	3
3	(France) M Pierce	6	6

Second round
12	(South Africa) A Coetzer	6^{0}	2
(United States) L Osterloh	7^{7}	6
(United States) A Stevenson	6^{6}	3
(Austria) P Wartusch	7^{8}	6
(Bulgaria) M Maleeva	6	5	3
(Netherlands) M Oremans	1	7	6
(Spain) M Serna	7^{7}	7^{7}
3	(France) M Pierce	6^{5}	6^{4}

Third round
(United States) L Osterloh	4	6	8
(Austria) P Wartusch	6	2	6
(Netherlands) M Oremans	6	4	4
(Spain) M Serna	4	6	6

Fourth round
(United States) L Osterloh	6^{1}	3
(Spain) M Serna	7^{7}	6

==== Section 7 ====
First round
6	(United States) M Seles	3	6	7
(Slovakia) K Habšudová	6	2	5
(Belgium) E Callens	6	6
(Venezuela) M Vento	3	2
(Germany) B Rittner	5	6	7
(Romania) C Cristea	7	2	9
(Russia) T Panova	3	6^{4}
(France) S Pitkowski	6	7^{7}
(Croatia) J Kostanić	4	1
(Federal Republic of Yugoslavia) S Načuk	6	6
(Austria) B Schwartz	0	3
WC	(United Kingdom) L Ahl	6	6
(Italy) R Grande	6	6
Q	(Austria) M Schnell	3	0
(Belgium) J Henin	1	6	1
9	(Spain) A Sánchez Vicario	6	1	6

Second round
6	(United States) M Seles	6	6
(Belgium) E Callens	4	4
(Romania) C Cristea	7	6^{5}	2
(France) S Pitkowski	5	7^{7}	6
(Federal Republic of Yugoslavia) S Načuk	6	6
WC	(United Kingdom) L Ahl	4	3
(Italy) R Grande	3	1
9	(Spain) A Sánchez Vicario	6	6

Third round
6	(United States) M Seles	6	6
(France) S Pitkowski	0	3
(Federal Republic of Yugoslavia) S Načuk	6	6^{5}	2
9	(Spain) A Sánchez Vicario	3	7^{7}	6

Fourth round
6	(United States) M Seles	6	6
9	(Spain) A Sánchez Vicario	3	4

==== Section 8 ====
First round
16	(Belgium) D Van Roost	2	4
(United States) J Capriati	6	6
(United States) M Shaughnessy	7	6
(Spain) M Sánchez Lorenzo	5	2
(Austria) S Plischke	4	4
(Germany) M Weingärtner	6	6
PR	(Indonesia) Y Basuki	4	6	6
(United States) M Irvin	6	2	4
(Argentina) P Suárez	6	6
(Switzerland) E Gagliardi	4	3
(Switzerland) P Schnyder	6	6
(Italy) T Garbin	3	2
(Russia) E Likhovtseva	3	6	6
(Switzerland) M Vavrinec	6	3	1
(United States) C Morariu	3	0^{r}
2	(United States) L Davenport	6	1

Second round
(United States) J Capriati	7^{7}	6
(United States) M Shaughnessy	6^{1}	2
(Germany) M Weingärtner	4	4
PR	(Indonesia) Y Basuki	6	6
(Argentina) P Suárez	6^{5}	6	6
(Switzerland) P Schnyder	7^{7}	3	3
(Russia) E Likhovtseva	6	3	3
2	(United States) L Davenport	3	6	6

Third round
(United States) J Capriati	7^{7}	6
PR	(Indonesia) Y Basuki	6^{4}	0
(Argentina) P Suárez	4	2
2	(United States) L Davenport	6	6

Fourth round
(United States) J Capriati	3	3
2	(United States) L Davenport	6	6

Preceded by 2000 French Open – Women's singles	Grand Slam women's singles	Succeeded by 2000 US Open – Women's singles
