= 2000 Wimbledon Championships – Mixed doubles =

Mixed doubles
- 2000 Wimbledon Championships

Final
- Champions: (United States) Donald Johnson (United States) Kimberly Po
- Runners-up: (Australia) Lleyton Hewitt (Belgium) Kim Clijsters
- Score: 6–4, 7–6^{(7–3)}

Details
- Draw: 64 (5 WC )
- Seeds: 16

Events
Singles	men	women		boys	girls
Doubles	men	women	mixed	boys	girls
WC Singles	men	women	quad
WC Doubles	men	women	quad
Legends	men	women	seniors
← 1999 ·	Wimbledon Championships	· 2001 →

Leander Paes and Lisa Raymond were the defending champions but Paes did not compete. Raymond competed with Paul Haarhuis but lost in the third round to Mark Knowles and Elena Likhovtseva.

Donald Johnson and Kimberly Po defeated Lleyton Hewitt and Kim Clijsters in the final, 6–4, 7–6^{(7–3)} to win the mixed doubles tennis title at the 2000 Wimbledon Championships.

== Seeds ==
1. (Australia) Todd Woodbridge / (Australia) Rennae Stubbs (second round)
2. (Netherlands) Paul Haarhuis / (United States) Lisa Raymond (third round)
3. (South Africa) Ellis Ferreira / (United States) Nicole Arendt (first round)
4. (Sweden) Jonas Björkman / (Russia) Anna Kournikova (first round)
5. (United States) Rick Leach / (South Africa) Amanda Coetzer (quarterfinals)
6. (South Africa) John-Laffnie de Jager / (Netherlands) Manon Bollegraf (quarterfinals)
7. (South Africa) Piet Norval / (Slovenia) Katarina Srebotnik (first round)
8. (United States) Donald Johnson / (United States) Kimberly Po (champions)
9. n/a
10. (The Bahamas) Mark Knowles / (Russia) Elena Likhovtseva (quarterfinals)
11. (Zimbabwe) Wayne Black / (Zimbabwe) Cara Black (first round)
12. (South Africa) David Adams / (South Africa) Mariaan de Swardt (third round)
13. (Sweden) Nicklas Kulti / (Sweden) Åsa Carlsson (second round)
14. (Argentina) Daniel Orsanic / (Netherlands) Caroline Vis (first round)
15. (Argentina) Martín García / (Argentina) Laura Montalvo (first round)
16. (United States) Brian MacPhie / (Argentina) Patricia Tarabini (first round)

Click on the seed number of a player to go to their draw section.

== Draw ==
=== Key ===
- Q = Qualifier
- WC = Wild card
- LL = Lucky loser
- Alt = Alternate
- ITF = ITF entry
- PR = Protected ranking
- SR = Special ranking
- SE = Special exempt
- JE = Junior exempt
- JR = Junior Accelerator Programme entrant
- CO = College Accelerator Programme entrant
- NG = Next Gen Accelerator Program entrant
- w/o = Walkover
- r = Retired
- d = Defaulted

=== Finals ===
Quarterfinals
(Australia) Joshua Eagle (Germany) Anke Huber	6	7^{7}
5	(United States) Rick Leach (South Africa) Amanda Coetzer	1	6^{5}
(United States) Eric Taino (United States) Katie Schlukebir	7	6^{8}	4
(Australia) Lleyton Hewitt (Belgium) Kim Clijsters	5	7^{10}	6
6	(South Africa) John-Laffnie de Jager (Netherlands) Manon Bollegraf	4	5
(Ecuador) Nicolás Lapentti (Austria) Barbara Schett	6	7
8	(United States) Donald Johnson (United States) Kimberly Po	6	6
10	(The Bahamas) Mark Knowles (Russia) Elena Likhovtseva	2	3

Semifinals
(Australia) Joshua Eagle (Germany) Anke Huber	4	5
(Australia) Lleyton Hewitt (Belgium) Kim Clijsters	6	7
(Ecuador) Nicolás Lapentti (Austria) Barbara Schett	3	4
8	(United States) Donald Johnson (United States) Kimberly Po	6	6

Final
(Australia) Lleyton Hewitt (Belgium) Kim Clijsters	4	6^{3}
8	(United States) Donald Johnson (United States) Kimberly Po	6	7^{7}

=== Top half ===
==== Section 1 ====
First round
1	(Australia) T Woodbridge (Australia) R Stubbs	6	6
(Japan) T Shimada (Japan) N Miyagi	3	4
(Federal Republic of Yugoslavia) D Vemić (Argentina) P Suárez	7^{7}	6
(United States) J Stark (Kazakhstan) I Selyutina	6^{5}	2
WC	(Belgium) X Malisse (United States) J Capriati	3	7^{8}	0
(Sweden) P Nyborg (Belgium) S Appelmans	6	6^{6}	0^{r}
(Australia) J Eagle (Germany) A Huber	6	7^{8}
11	(Zimbabwe) W Black (Zimbabwe) C Black	3	6^{6}
16	(United States) B MacPhie (Argentina) P Tarabini	2	4
(Czech Republic) C Suk (Slovenia) T Križan	6	6
(Russia) A Olhovskiy (Czech Republic) E Martincová	2	6	7
(Australia) A Kratzmann (Australia) T Musgrave	6	3	9
(Australia) S Stolle (United States) L McNeil	6	6
(United States) J Waite (United States) E deLone	3	4
(South Africa) K Ullyett (United States) T Snyder	5	1
5	(United States) R Leach (South Africa) A Coetzer	7	6

Second round
1	(Australia) T Woodbridge (Australia) R Stubbs	6	6^{3}	4
(Federal Republic of Yugoslavia) D Vemić (Argentina) P Suárez	2	7^{7}	6
WC	(Belgium) X Malisse (United States) J Capriati	3	6	3
(Australia) J Eagle (Germany) A Huber	6	3	6
(Czech Republic) C Suk (Slovenia) T Križan	4	2
(Australia) A Kratzmann (Australia) T Musgrave	6	6
(Australia) S Stolle (United States) L McNeil	5	5
5	(United States) R Leach (South Africa) A Coetzer	7	7

Third round
(Federal Republic of Yugoslavia) D Vemić (Argentina) P Suárez	6	4	4
(Australia) J Eagle (Germany) A Huber	3	6	6
(Australia) A Kratzmann (Australia) T Musgrave	6^{3}	6^{5}
5	(United States) R Leach (South Africa) A Coetzer	7^{7}	7^{7}

Quarterfinals
(Australia) J Eagle (Germany) A Huber	6	7^{7}
5	(United States) R Leach (South Africa) A Coetzer	1	6^{5}

==== Section 2 ====
First round
3	(South Africa) E Ferreira (United States) N Arendt	6	3	5
(Spain) JI Carrasco (Spain) G Riera	3	6	7
(North Macedonia) A Kitinov (Bulgaria) S Krivencheva	4	4
(Italy) D Nargiso (Italy) T Garbin	6	6
WC	(South Africa) J Coetzee (United Kingdom) L Latimer	5	4
(Spain) J Velasco Jr. (Spain) V Ruano Pascual	7	6
(United States) E Taino (United States) K Schlukebir	6	6
Alt	(Australia) P Tramacchi (Australia) B Stewart	3	3
14	(Argentina) D Orsanic (Netherlands) C Vis	1	4
(Australia) L Hewitt (Belgium) K Clijsters	6	6
(Australia) M Hill (Australia) A Molik	7^{7}	6^{4}	3
(Australia) P Kilderry (France) S Testud	6^{4}	7^{7}	6
(Czech Republic) M Damm (Slovakia) H Nagyová	1	5
(France) M Llodra (France) J Halard-Decugis	6	7
(Czech Republic) P Pála (Slovakia) J Husárová	6^{1}	6	6
7	(South Africa) P Norval (Slovenia) K Srebotnik	7^{7}	3	4

Second round
(Spain) JI Carrasco (Spain) G Riera	7^{7}	7
(Italy) D Nargiso (Italy) T Garbin	6^{4}	5
(Spain) J Velasco Jr. (Spain) V Ruano Pascual	4	4
(United States) E Taino (United States) K Schlukebir	6	6
(Australia) L Hewitt (Belgium) K Clijsters	6	7^{7}
(Australia) P Kilderry (France) S Testud	1	6^{4}
(France) M Llodra (France) J Halard-Decugis	6	6
(Czech Republic) P Pála (Slovakia) J Husárová	3	4

Third round
(Spain) JI Carrasco (Spain) G Riera	4	6^{3}
(United States) E Taino (United States) K Schlukebir	6	7^{7}
(Australia) L Hewitt (Belgium) K Clijsters	6	6
(France) M Llodra (France) J Halard-Decugis	3	4

Quarterfinals
(United States) E Taino (United States) K Schlukebir	7	6^{8}	4
(Australia) L Hewitt (Belgium) K Clijsters	5	7^{10}	6

=== Bottom half ===
==== Section 3 ====
First round
6	(South Africa) J-L de Jager (Netherlands) M Bollegraf	6	6
(Argentina) L Arnold Ker (Croatia) J Kostanić	2	3
(United States) D Bowen (Japan) R Hiraki	6	7
(South Africa) C Haggard (Belgium) E Callens	4	5
(Sweden) J Landsberg (Germany) B Rittner	6^{5}	6	2
(United States) M Bryan (Canada) S Jeyaseelan	7^{7}	4	6
WC	(United Kingdom) B Cowan (United Kingdom) J Pullin	3	3
12	(South Africa) D Adams (South Africa) M de Swardt	6	6
15	(Argentina) M García (Argentina) L Montalvo	3	6^{0}
(Ecuador) N Lapentti (Austria) B Schett	6	7^{7}
(Netherlands) J Siemerink (Netherlands) M Oremans	6	6^{5}	18
WC	(India) M Bhupathi (United States) M Navratilova	4	7^{7}	16
(United States) J Palmer (Croatia) M Lučić	6	6
(South Africa) L Bale (South Africa) L Horn	4	4
(Australia) W Arthurs (Australia) C Barclay	6	3	6
4	(Sweden) J Björkman (Russia) A Kournikova	3	6	3

Second round
6	(South Africa) J-L de Jager (Netherlands) M Bollegraf	6	6
(United States) D Bowen (Japan) R Hiraki	1	2
(United States) M Bryan (Canada) S Jeyaseelan	1	7	4
12	(South Africa) D Adams (South Africa) M de Swardt	6	5	6
(Ecuador) N Lapentti (Austria) B Schett	7	7^{7}
(Netherlands) J Siemerink (Netherlands) M Oremans	5	6^{4}
(United States) J Palmer (Croatia) M Lučić	6	3	6
(Australia) W Arthurs (Australia) C Barclay	3	6	3

Third round
6	(South Africa) J-L de Jager (Netherlands) M Bollegraf	3	7^{7}	6
12	(South Africa) D Adams (South Africa) M de Swardt	6	6^{5}	4
(Ecuador) N Lapentti (Austria) B Schett	7	7^{9}
(United States) J Palmer (Croatia) M Lučić	5	6^{7}

Quarterfinals
6	(South Africa) J-L de Jager (Netherlands) M Bollegraf	4	5
(Ecuador) N Lapentti (Austria) B Schett	6	7

==== Section 4 ====
First round
8	(United States) D Johnson (United States) K Po	6	3	9
(Israel) E Ran (Hungary) K Marosi-Aracama	2	6	7
(Australia) D Macpherson (Slovakia) K Habšudová	6	6
(South Africa) M Wakefield (South Africa) N de Villiers	4	4
(United States) B Bryan (Australia) L McShea	5	5
(Belgium) T Vanhoudt (Belgium) D Van Roost	7	7
(Federal Republic of Yugoslavia) N Zimonjić (Australia) J Dokic	4	4
13	(Sweden) N Kulti (Sweden) Å Carlsson	6	6
10	(The Bahamas) M Knowles (Russia) E Likhovtseva	5	7^{7}	6
(South Africa) R Koenig (Australia) N Pratt	7	6^{4}	2
WC	(United Kingdom) K Spencer (United Kingdom) S Smith	5
(Sweden) F Bergh (United States) M Shaughnessy	2^{r}
(Australia) A Florent (Australia) R McQuillan	5	0^{r}
(United States) J Gimelstob (United States) A Stevenson	7	0
(South Africa) N Godwin (South Africa) S de Beer	6	5	3
2	(Netherlands) P Haarhuis (United States) L Raymond	3	7	6

Second round
8	(United States) D Johnson (United States) K Po	6	6
(Australia) D Macpherson (Slovakia) K Habšudová	3	3
(Belgium) T Vanhoudt (Belgium) D Van Roost	2	7	6
13	(Sweden) N Kulti (Sweden) Å Carlsson	6	5	2
10	(The Bahamas) M Knowles (Russia) E Likhovtseva	6	6
WC	(United Kingdom) K Spencer (United Kingdom) S Smith	2	4
(United States) J Gimelstob (United States) A Stevenson	3	4
2	(Netherlands) P Haarhuis (United States) L Raymond	6	6

Third round
8	(United States) D Johnson (United States) K Po	6	6
(Belgium) T Vanhoudt (Belgium) D Van Roost	3	4
10	(The Bahamas) M Knowles (Russia) E Likhovtseva	3	6	8
2	(Netherlands) P Haarhuis (United States) L Raymond	6	3	6

Quarterfinals
8	(United States) D Johnson (United States) K Po	6	6
10	(The Bahamas) M Knowles (Russia) E Likhovtseva	2	3
