= 2000 Wimbledon Championships – Men's doubles =

Men's doubles
- 2000 Wimbledon Championships

Final
- Champions: (Australia) Todd Woodbridge (Australia) Mark Woodforde
- Runners-up: (Netherlands) Paul Haarhuis (Australia) Sandon Stolle
- Score: 6–3, 6–4, 6–1

Details
- Draw: 64 (4 Q / 5 WC )
- Seeds: 16

Events
Singles	men	women		boys	girls
Doubles	men	women	mixed	boys	girls
WC Singles	men	women	quad
WC Doubles	men	women	quad
Legends	men	women	seniors
← 1999 ·	Wimbledon Championships	· 2001 →

Todd Woodbridge and Mark Woodforde defeated Paul Haarhuis and Sandon Stolle in the final, 6–3, 6–4, 6–1, to win the gentlemen's doubles title at the 2000 Wimbledon Championships. It was their sixth Wimbledon title and eleventh and last major title overall, though Woodbridge would go on to win the title a further three times partnering Jonas Björkman.

Mahesh Bhupathi and Leander Paes were the defending champions, but Paes did not compete. Bhupathi partnered with David Prinosil but lost in the third round to Roger Federer and Andrew Kratzmann.

This marked Haarhuis' fourth consecutive final with the third partner change in a row.

== Seeds ==
1. (Australia) Todd Woodbridge / (Australia) Mark Woodforde (champions)
2. (Netherlands) Paul Haarhuis / (Australia) Sandon Stolle (final)
3. (United States) Alex O'Brien / (United States) Jared Palmer (quarterfinals)
4. (South Africa) Ellis Ferreira / (United States) Rick Leach (quarterfinals)
5. (Sweden) Jonas Björkman / (Zimbabwe) Byron Black (third round)
6. (South Africa) David Adams / (South Africa) John-Laffnie de Jager (semifinals)
7. (Czech Republic) Martin Damm / (South Africa) Wayne Ferreira (second round)
8. (Czech Republic) Jiří Novák / (Czech Republic) David Rikl (third round)
9. (Canada) Sébastien Lareau / (Canada) Daniel Nestor (quarterfinals)
10. (India) Mahesh Bhupathi / (Germany) David Prinosil (third round)
11. (Sweden) Nicklas Kulti / (Sweden) Mikael Tillström (semifinals)
12. (Zimbabwe) Wayne Black / (Zimbabwe) Kevin Ullyett (first round)
13. (United States) Donald Johnson / (South Africa) Piet Norval (second round)
14. (United States) Justin Gimelstob / (The Bahamas) Mark Knowles (third round)
15. (Australia) Joshua Eagle / (Australia) Andrew Florent (second round)
16. (Spain) Tomás Carbonell / (Argentina) Martín García (first round)

Click on the seed number of a player to go to their draw section.

== Draw ==
=== Key ===
- Q = Qualifier
- WC = Wild card
- LL = Lucky loser
- Alt = Alternate
- ITF = ITF entry
- PR = Protected ranking
- SR = Special ranking
- SE = Special exempt
- JE = Junior exempt
- JR = Junior Accelerator Programme entrant
- CO = College Accelerator Programme entrant
- NG = Next Gen Accelerator Program entrant
- w/o = Walkover
- r = Retired
- d = Defaulted

=== Finals ===
Quarterfinals
1	(Australia) Todd Woodbridge (Australia) Mark Woodforde	6	6^{4}	4	6	8
9	(Canada) Sébastien Lareau (Canada) Daniel Nestor	3	7^{7}	6	3	6
3	(United States) Alex O'Brien (United States) Jared Palmer	4	6	3	3
11	(Sweden) Nicklas Kulti (Sweden) Mikael Tillström	6	3	6	6
4	(South Africa) Ellis Ferreira (United States) Rick Leach	7^{7}	7^{7}	6^{4}	6^{7}	6
6	(South Africa) David Adams (South Africa) John-Laffnie de Jager	6^{5}	6^{3}	7^{7}	7^{8}	8
(Switzerland) Roger Federer (Australia) Andrew Kratzmann	7^{7}	7	6^{2}	2	2
2	(Netherlands) Paul Haarhuis (Australia) Sandon Stolle	6^{5}	5	7^{7}	6	6

Semifinals
1	(Australia) Todd Woodbridge (Australia) Mark Woodforde	6	7^{7}	6
11	(Sweden) Nicklas Kulti (Sweden) Mikael Tillström	4	6^{2}	2
6	(South Africa) David Adams (South Africa) John-Laffnie de Jager	4	6^{5}	7^{7}	4
2	(Netherlands) Paul Haarhuis (Australia) Sandon Stolle	6	7^{7}	6^{4}	6

Final
1	(Australia) Todd Woodbridge (Australia) Mark Woodforde	6	6	6
2	(Netherlands) Paul Haarhuis (Australia) Sandon Stolle	3	4	1

=== Top half ===
==== Section 1 ====
First round
1	(Australia) T Woodbridge (Australia) M Woodforde	6	6	6
(United States) J-M Gambill (United States) S Humphries	2	3	2
WC	(United Kingdom) J Delgado (United Kingdom) M Lee	6^{2}	3	1
(Japan) T Shimada (South Africa) M Wakefield	7^{7}	6	6
(Italy) M Bertolini (Italy) C Brandi	6	6	7
WC	(United Kingdom) B Cowan (United Kingdom) K Spencer	4	3	5
WC	(United Kingdom) N Broad (United Kingdom) A Parmar	4	6	6^{3}	6	3
15	(Australia) J Eagle (Australia) A Florent	6	4	7^{7}	3	6
9	(Canada) S Lareau (Canada) D Nestor	4	6	6	3	6
(South Africa) M Barnard (South Africa) C Haggard	6	3	4	6	1
Q	(Italy) S Pescosolido (Italy) V Santopadre	6	6^{2}	6	6
(South Africa) G Stafford (Australia) P Tramacchi	3	7^{7}	3	2
WC	(United Kingdom) M Hilton (United Kingdom) J Nelson	5	4	7^{9}	6^{4}
(Czech Republic) P Pála (Czech Republic) P Vízner	7	6	6^{7}	7^{7}
(Argentina) G Etlis (Argentina) M Rodríguez	6	4	3	6	7
8	(Czech Republic) J Novák (Czech Republic) D Rikl	4	6	6	3	9

Second round
1	(Australia) T Woodbridge (Australia) M Woodforde	7^{7}	7^{7}	4	6
(Japan) T Shimada (South Africa) M Wakefield	6^{5}	6^{3}	6	3
(Italy) M Bertolini (Italy) C Brandi	6	7^{7}	6^{4}	3	6
15	(Australia) J Eagle (Australia) A Florent	4	6^{4}	7^{7}	6	3
9	(Canada) S Lareau (Canada) D Nestor	6	6	6^{2}	6
Q	(Italy) S Pescosolido (Italy) V Santopadre	1	4	7^{7}	2
(Czech Republic) P Pála (Czech Republic) P Vízner	1	2	4
8	(Czech Republic) J Novák (Czech Republic) D Rikl	6	6	6

Third round
1	(Australia) T Woodbridge (Australia) M Woodforde	6	6	6
(Italy) M Bertolini (Italy) C Brandi	4	3	3
9	(Canada) S Lareau (Canada) D Nestor	6	6	7^{7}
8	(Czech Republic) J Novák (Czech Republic) D Rikl	4	3	6^{2}

Quarterfinals
1	(Australia) T Woodbridge (Australia) M Woodforde	6	6^{4}	4	6	8
9	(Canada) S Lareau (Canada) D Nestor	3	7^{7}	6	3	6

==== Section 2 ====
First round
3	(United States) A O'Brien (United States) J Palmer	6	6	6
(Czech Republic) T Cibulec (Czech Republic) L Friedl	0	2	4
WC	(United Kingdom) J Davidson (United Kingdom) O Freelove	4	4	7^{7}	5
(Australia) P Kilderry (Spain) A Martín	6	6	6^{4}	7
Q	(Israel) N Behr (Japan) S Iwabuchi	6	1	4	4
(Brazil) J Oncins (Czech Republic) C Suk	1	6	6	6
(Slovakia) D Hrbatý (Brazil) G Kuerten	7^{7}	6^{4}	1^{r}
13	(United States) D Johnson (South Africa) P Norval	6^{4}	7^{7}	2
11	(Sweden) N Kulti (Sweden) M Tillström	7	6	6
(Australia) D Macpherson (Australia) M Tebbutt	5	3	1
Q	(Canada) J Robichaud (United States) M Sell	6^{4}	6	6	5	8
(Germany) M-K Goellner (Netherlands) J Siemerink	7^{7}	3	2	7	10
(France) M Llodra (Italy) D Nargiso	7^{7}	6	6
(North Macedonia) A Kitinov (Socialist Federal Republic of Yugoslavia) D Vemić	6^{4}	4	4
(Argentina) L Arnold Ker (Argentina) D Orsanic	4	6^{4}	3
5	(Sweden) J Björkman (Zimbabwe) B Black	6	7^{7}	6

Second round
3	(United States) A O'Brien (United States) J Palmer	6	6	4	6
(Australia) P Kilderry (Spain) A Martín	0	4	6	4
(Brazil) J Oncins (Czech Republic) C Suk	6	3	2	6	8
13	(United States) D Johnson (South Africa) P Norval	4	6	6	4	6
11	(Sweden) N Kulti (Sweden) M Tillström	7^{7}	7^{7}	7^{7}
(Germany) M-K Goellner (Netherlands) J Siemerink	6^{3}	6^{2}	6^{4}
(France) M Llodra (Italy) D Nargiso	6^{6}	5	6	1
5	(Sweden) J Björkman (Zimbabwe) B Black	7^{8}	7	3	6

Third round
3	(United States) A O'Brien (United States) J Palmer	4	6	7	6^{2}	7
(Brazil) J Oncins (Czech Republic) C Suk	6	3	5	7^{7}	5
11	(Sweden) N Kulti (Sweden) M Tillström	7^{7}	6	7^{9}
5	(Sweden) J Björkman (Zimbabwe) B Black	6^{3}	3	6^{7}

Quarterfinals
3	(United States) A O'Brien (United States) J Palmer	4	6	3	3
11	(Sweden) N Kulti (Sweden) M Tillström	6	3	6	6

=== Bottom half ===
==== Section 3 ====
First round
6	(South Africa) D Adams (South Africa) J-L de Jager	7^{7}	3	6	5	6
(Sweden) S Aspelin (Sweden) J Landsberg	6^{5}	6	3	7	4
(Portugal) N Marques (Belgium) T Vanhoudt	7^{7}	6^{7}	3	6^{4}
(South Africa) R Koenig (Russia) A Olhovskiy	6^{2}	7^{9}	6	7^{7}
(United States) P Galbraith (United States) B MacPhie	6	6	7^{7}
(United States) B Bryan (United States) M Bryan	4	4	6^{4}
(Australia) W Arthurs (Australia) B Ellwood	5	6	7	6
12	(Zimbabwe) W Black (Zimbabwe) K Ullyett	7	3	5	3
14	(United States) J Gimelstob (The Bahamas) M Knowles	6	6	6
(Belarus) M Mirnyi (Federal Republic of Yugoslavia) N Zimonjić	3	2	4
(United States) D Bowen (United States) B Coupe	3	6	6^{2}	6	3
(Brazil) A Prieto (Israel) E Ran	6	2	7^{7}	4	6
(South Africa) N Godwin (Australia) M Hill	6	6^{5}	6^{5}	3
(Switzerland) M Rosset (United States) J Tarango	4	7^{7}	7^{7}	6
(Argentina) P Albano (Ecuador) N Lapentti	6^{4}	2	4
4	(South Africa) E Ferreira (United States) R Leach	7^{7}	6	6

Second round
6	(South Africa) D Adams (South Africa) J-L de Jager	7^{9}	6	6^{2}	6
(South Africa) R Koenig (Russia) A Olhovskiy	6^{7}	4	7^{7}	4
(United States) P Galbraith (United States) B MacPhie	6	3	4	6^{4}
(Australia) W Arthurs (Australia) B Ellwood	4	6	6	7^{7}
14	(United States) J Gimelstob (The Bahamas) M Knowles	7	6	6
(Brazil) A Prieto (Israel) E Ran	5	3	4
(Switzerland) M Rosset (United States) J Tarango	6	3	0	1
4	(South Africa) E Ferreira (United States) R Leach	4	6	6	6

Third round
6	(South Africa) D Adams (South Africa) J-L de Jager	3	7	7	6
(Australia) W Arthurs (Australia) B Ellwood	6	5	5	3
14	(United States) J Gimelstob (The Bahamas) M Knowles	3	4	4
4	(South Africa) E Ferreira (United States) R Leach	6	6	6

Quarterfinals
6	(South Africa) D Adams (South Africa) J-L de Jager	6^{5}	6^{3}	7^{7}	7^{9}	8
4	(South Africa) E Ferreira (United States) R Leach	7^{7}	7^{7}	6^{4}	6^{7}	6

==== Section 4 ====
First round
7	(Czech Republic) M Damm (South Africa) W Ferreira	7^{7}	6	4	6
(South Africa) L Bale (South Africa) M Ondruska	6^{5}	4	6	2
(Switzerland) R Federer (Australia) A Kratzmann	6	6^{4}	6	6^{3}	6
Q	(United States) J Blake (United States) K Kim	3	7^{7}	2	7^{7}	4
(Spain) E Nicolás (Spain) G Puentes	3	6^{5}	4
(Sweden) F Bergh (Sweden) P Nyborg	6	7^{7}	6
(Argentina) M Hood (Argentina) S Prieto	3	2	4
10	(India) M Bhupathi (Germany) D Prinosil	6	6	6
16	(Spain) T Carbonell (Argentina) M García	2	4	6	5
(France) O Delaître (France) F Santoro	6	6	3	7
(Spain) Á López Morón (Spain) A Portas	3	1	7^{7}	3
(South Africa) J Coetzee (South Africa) B Haygarth	6	6	6^{2}	6
(United States) P Goldstein (United States) J Waite	6	6	5	6^{5}	6
(Spain) JI Carrasco (Spain) J Velasco Jr.	4	4	7	7^{7}	2
(United States) J Stark (United States) E Taino	7^{7}	6^{7}	4	3
2	(Netherlands) P Haarhuis (Australia) S Stolle	6^{2}	7^{9}	6	6

Second round
7	(Czech Republic) M Damm (South Africa) W Ferreira	6^{5}	2	6	4
(Switzerland) R Federer (Australia) A Kratzmann	7^{7}	6	3	6
(Sweden) F Bergh (Sweden) P Nyborg	4	6^{6}	6	6^{11}
10	(India) M Bhupathi (Germany) D Prinosil	6	7^{8}	4	7^{13}
(France) O Delaître (France) F Santoro	3	6	6	6
(South Africa) J Coetzee (South Africa) B Haygarth	6	3	2	2
(United States) P Goldstein (United States) J Waite	2	2	4
2	(Netherlands) P Haarhuis (Australia) S Stolle	6	6	6

Third round
(Switzerland) R Federer (Australia) A Kratzmann	7^{7}	6	6
10	(India) M Bhupathi (Germany) D Prinosil	6^{2}	4	4
(France) O Delaître (France) F Santoro	3	6^{3}	5
2	(Netherlands) P Haarhuis (Australia) S Stolle	6	7^{7}	7

Quarterfinals
(Switzerland) R Federer (Australia) A Kratzmann	7^{7}	7	6^{2}	2	2
2	(Netherlands) P Haarhuis (Australia) S Stolle	6^{5}	5	7^{7}	6	6
