= 2000 Wimbledon Championships – Women's doubles =

Women's doubles
- 2000 Wimbledon Championships

Final
- Champions: (United States) Serena Williams (United States) Venus Williams
- Runners-up: (France) Julie Halard-Decugis (Japan) Ai Sugiyama
- Score: 6–3, 6–2

Details
- Draw: 64 (4 Q / 4 WC )
- Seeds: 16

Events
Singles	men	women		boys	girls
Doubles	men	women	mixed	boys	girls
WC Singles	men	women	quad
WC Doubles	men	women	quad
Legends	men	women	seniors
← 1999 ·	Wimbledon Championships	· 2001 →

Serena and Venus Williams defeated Julie Halard-Decugis and Ai Sugiyama in the final, 6-3, 6-2 to win the ladies' doubles tennis title at the 2000 Wimbledon Championships. They became the first pair of sisters to win the title. It was their third major title in doubles, and the third component in an eventual career Golden Slam in doubles. The Williams sisters had only played three events thus far into the season, and only entered the draw via a wildcard.

Lindsay Davenport and Corina Morariu were the defending champions but did not compete.

== Seeds ==
1. (United States) Lisa Raymond / (Australia) Rennae Stubbs (semifinals)
2. n/a
3. (Switzerland) Martina Hingis / (France) Mary Pierce (second round)
4. (France) Julie Halard-Decugis / (Japan) Ai Sugiyama (finals)
5. (Russia) Anna Kournikova / (Belarus) Natasha Zvereva (semifinals)
6. (Spain) Virginia Ruano Pascual / (Argentina) Paola Suárez (quarterfinals)
7. (United States) Chanda Rubin / (France) Sandrine Testud (third round)
8. (United States) Serena Williams / (United States) Venus Williams (champions)
9. (France) Alexandra Fusai / (France) Nathalie Tauziat (second round)
10. (Spain) Conchita Martínez / (Argentina) Patricia Tarabini (second round)
11. (United States) Nicole Arendt / (Netherlands) Manon Bollegraf (second round)
12. (Romania) Irina Spîrlea / (Netherlands) Caroline Vis (third round)
13. (United States) Kimberly Po / (France) Anne-Gaëlle Sidot (second round)
14. (Germany) Anke Huber / (Austria) Barbara Schett (third round)
15. (Belgium) Laurence Courtois / (Russia) Elena Likhovtseva (first round)
16. (Slovenia) Tina Križan / (Slovenia) Katarina Srebotnik (first round)
17. (South Africa) Liezel Horn / (Argentina) Laura Montalvo (second round)

Click on the seed number of a player to go to their draw section.

== Draw ==
=== Key ===
- Q = Qualifier
- WC = Wild card
- LL = Lucky loser
- Alt = Alternate
- ITF = ITF entry
- PR = Protected ranking
- SR = Special ranking
- SE = Special exempt
- JE = Junior exempt
- JR = Junior Accelerator Programme entrant
- CO = College Accelerator Programme entrant
- NG = Next Gen Accelerator Program entrant
- w/o = Walkover
- r = Retired
- d = Defaulted

=== Finals ===
Quarterfinals
1	(United States) Lisa Raymond (Australia) Rennae Stubbs	7^{7}	6^{6}	7
(Netherlands) Kristie Boogert (Netherlands) Miriam Oremans	6^{5}	7^{8}	5
4	(France) Julie Halard-Decugis (Japan) Ai Sugiyama	6	6
6	(Spain) Virginia Ruano Pascual (Argentina) Paola Suárez	4	2
5	(Russia) Anna Kournikova (Belarus) Natasha Zvereva	6	6
(France) Amélie Cocheteux (France) Nathalie Dechy	4	4
8/ WC	(United States) Serena Williams (United States) Venus Williams	4	6	6
WC	(South Africa) Mariaan de Swardt (United States) Martina Navratilova	6	2	1

Semifinals
1	(United States) Lisa Raymond (Australia) Rennae Stubbs	6	5	2
4	(France) Julie Halard-Decugis (Japan) Ai Sugiyama	3	7	6
5	(Russia) Anna Kournikova (Belarus) Natasha Zvereva	3	6^{4}
8/ WC	(United States) Serena Williams (United States) Venus Williams	6	7^{7}

Final
4	(France) Julie Halard-Decugis (Japan) Ai Sugiyama	3	2
8/ WC	(United States) Serena Williams (United States) Venus Williams	6	6

=== Top half ===
==== Section 1 ====
First round
1	(United States) L Raymond (Australia) R Stubbs	6	6
(Belgium) S Appelmans (Italy) R Grande	1	3
(Romania) C Cristea (Romania) R Dragomir	6	6
Q	(United Kingdom) H Crook (United Kingdom) V Davies	1	4
(Australia) C Barclay (Slovakia) K Habšudová	2	3
(Belgium) E Callens (Belgium) D Van Roost	6	6
LL	(United States) J Hopkins (Slovenia) P Rampre	7	1	2
11	(United States) N Arendt (Netherlands) M Bollegraf	5	6	6
15	(Belgium) L Courtois (Russia) E Likhovtseva	4	6	2
(Netherlands) K Boogert (Netherlands) M Oremans	6	4	6
(South Africa) A Coetzer (United States) L McNeil	6	6
(Canada) S Jeyaseelan (Croatia) J Kostanić	2	3
(Japan) R Hiraki (Netherlands) S Noorlander	6	6
WC	(United Kingdom) L Latimer (United Kingdom) S Smith	2	2
(United States) L Osterloh (Canada) V Webb	2	4
7	(United States) C Rubin (France) S Testud	6	6

Second round
1	(United States) L Raymond (Australia) R Stubbs	6	6
(Romania) C Cristea (Romania) R Dragomir	3	3
(Belgium) E Callens (Belgium) D Van Roost	6	6
11	(United States) N Arendt (Netherlands) M Bollegraf	4	1
(Netherlands) K Boogert (Netherlands) M Oremans	6	4	9
(South Africa) A Coetzer (United States) L McNeil	3	6	7
(Japan) R Hiraki (Netherlands) S Noorlander	1	5
7	(United States) C Rubin (France) S Testud	6	7

Third round
1	(United States) L Raymond (Australia) R Stubbs	6	7^{7}
(Belgium) E Callens (Belgium) D Van Roost	3	6^{4}
(Netherlands) K Boogert (Netherlands) M Oremans	7^{8}	4	6
7	(United States) C Rubin (France) S Testud	6^{6}	6	2

Quarterfinals
1	(United States) L Raymond (Australia) R Stubbs	7^{7}	6^{6}	7
(Netherlands) K Boogert (Netherlands) M Oremans	6^{5}	7^{8}	5

==== Section 2 ====
First round
4	(France) J Halard-Decugis (Japan) A Sugiyama	6	6
(Russia) L Krasnoroutskaya (Latvia) L Neiland	4	3
(Italy) A Canepa (Italy) G Casoni	3	6	3
(Belgium) K Clijsters (Slovenia) T Pisnik	6	3	6
(United States) J Capriati (Australia) J Dokic	6	6
(Poland) M Grzybowska (Japan) Y Yoshida	2	4
(Australia) T Musgrave (Australia) B Stewart	2	6^{6}
10	(Spain) C Martínez (Argentina) P Tarabini	6	7^{8}
14	(Germany) A Huber (Austria) B Schett	6	7
(Australia) R McQuillan (Australia) L McShea	3	5
WC	(United Kingdom) J Pullin (United Kingdom) L Woodroffe	6	6
(United States) D Buth (United States) J Scott	4	1
(Czech Republic) E Martincová (Federal Republic of Yugoslavia) S Načuk	1	3
Q	(Germany) A Bachmann (Denmark) E Dyrberg	6	6
Q	(Tunisia) S Sfar (Germany) J Wöhr	4	2
6	(Spain) V Ruano Pascual (Argentina) P Suárez	6	6

Second round
4	(France) J Halard-Decugis (Japan) A Sugiyama	6	6
(Belgium) K Clijsters (Slovenia) T Pisnik	2	2
(United States) J Capriati (Australia) J Dokic	6	6
10	(Spain) C Martínez (Argentina) P Tarabini	3	4
14	(Germany) A Huber (Austria) B Schett	7^{8}	6
WC	(United Kingdom) J Pullin (United Kingdom) L Woodroffe	6^{6}	0
Q	(Germany) A Bachmann (Denmark) E Dyrberg	5	6	2
6	(Spain) V Ruano Pascual (Argentina) P Suárez	7	2	6

Third round
4	(France) J Halard-Decugis (Japan) A Sugiyama	6	6
(United States) J Capriati (Australia) J Dokic	3	3
14	(Germany) A Huber (Austria) B Schett	1	2
6	(Spain) V Ruano Pascual (Argentina) P Suárez	6	6

Quarterfinals
4	(France) J Halard-Decugis (Japan) A Sugiyama	6	6
6	(Spain) V Ruano Pascual (Argentina) P Suárez	4	2

=== Bottom half ===
==== Section 3 ====
First round
5	(Russia) A Kournikova (Belarus) N Zvereva	6	6
(South Africa) N de Villiers (South Africa) J Steck	3	1
(Russia) E Kulikovskaya (Austria) P Wartusch	2	5
(Czech Republic) K Hrdličková (Germany) B Rittner	6	7
(United States) A Frazier (United States) K Schlukebir	6	6
(South Africa) K Grant (United States) T Snyder	4	0
(Slovakia) J Husárová (Italy) MP Zavagli	2	3
9	(France) A Fusai (France) N Tauziat	6	6
16	(Slovenia) T Križan (Slovenia) K Srebotnik	5	3
(Australia) A Ellwood (Australia) A Molik	7	6
(Sweden) Å Carlsson (France) É Loit	7^{7}	6
(Switzerland) E Gagliardi (Switzerland) P Schnyder	6^{4}	2
(Bulgaria) S Krivencheva (Belarus) T Poutchek	5	1
(France) A Cocheteux (France) N Dechy	7	6
(Argentina) F Labat (Thailand) T Tanasugarn	1	2
3	(Switzerland) M Hingis (France) M Pierce	6	6

Second round
5	(Russia) A Kournikova (Belarus) N Zvereva	6	6
(Czech Republic) K Hrdličková (Germany) B Rittner	2	2
(United States) A Frazier (United States) K Schlukebir	7^{7}	7^{12}
9	(France) A Fusai (France) N Tauziat	6^{4}	6^{10}
(Australia) A Ellwood (Australia) A Molik	4	6	6
(Sweden) Å Carlsson (France) É Loit	6	4	4
(France) A Cocheteux (France) N Dechy	6	6
3	(Switzerland) M Hingis (France) M Pierce	4	3

Third round
5	(Russia) A Kournikova (Belarus) N Zvereva	6	6
(United States) A Frazier (United States) K Schlukebir	2	1
(Australia) A Ellwood (Australia) A Molik	6	6
(France) A Cocheteux (France) N Dechy	4	3

Quarterfinals
5	(Russia) A Kournikova (Belarus) N Zvereva	6	6
(France) A Cocheteux (France) N Dechy	4	4

==== Section 4 ====
First round
8/ WC	(United States) S Williams (United States) V Williams	6	6
(Zimbabwe) C Black (Kazakhstan) I Selyutina	3	2
LL	(France) C Dhenin (Canada) R Kolbovic	5	6^{4}
(South Africa) S de Beer (Japan) N Miyagi	7	7^{7}
(United States) E deLone (Australia) N Pratt	4	3
(Italy) S Farina (United States) L Wild	6	6
(Italy) T Garbin (Hungary) K Marosi-Aracama	6	5	2
12	(Romania) I Spîrlea (Netherlands) C Vis	2	7	6
13	(United States) K Po (France) A G Sidot	6	6
(Spain) E Bes (Spain) G Riera	2	1
WC	(South Africa) M de Swardt (United States) M Navratilova	6	6^{4}	6
(Bulgaria) L Bacheva (Netherlands) A Hopmans	3	7^{7}	3
(Spain) M Serna (United States) M Shaughnessy	6^{3}	7^{9}	2
(France) A Mauresmo (Spain) A Sánchez Vicario	7^{7}	6^{7}	6
Q	(Japan) S Asagoe (United States) S Reeves	1	6	4
17	(South Africa) L Horn (Argentina) L Montalvo	6	4	6

Second round
8/ WC	(United States) S Williams (United States) V Williams	6	6
(South Africa) S de Beer (Japan) N Miyagi	2	3
(Italy) S Farina (United States) L Wild	6	5	4
12	(Romania) I Spîrlea (Netherlands) C Vis	4	7	6
13	(United States) K Po (France) A G Sidot	6	3	5
WC	(South Africa) M de Swardt (United States) M Navratilova	4	6	7
(France) A Mauresmo (Spain) A Sánchez Vicario	6^{4}	6	6
17	(South Africa) L Horn (Argentina) L Montalvo	7^{7}	3	3

Third round
8/ WC	(United States) S Williams (United States) V Williams	6	6
12	(Romania) I Spîrlea (Netherlands) C Vis	3	2
WC	(South Africa) M de Swardt (United States) M Navratilova	6	6
(France) A Mauresmo (Spain) A Sánchez Vicario	1	1

Quarterfinals
8/ WC	(United States) S Williams (United States) V Williams	4	6	6
WC	(South Africa) M de Swardt (United States) M Navratilova	6	2	1
