= 2000 Wimbledon Championships – Men's singles =

Men's singles
- 2000 Wimbledon Championships

Final
- Champion: (United States) Pete Sampras
- Runner-up: (Australia) Patrick Rafter
- Score: 6–7^{(10–12)}, 7–6^{(7–5)}, 6–4, 6–2

Details
- Draw: 128 (16 Q / 8 WC )
- Seeds: 16

Events
Singles	men	women		boys	girls
Doubles	men	women	mixed	boys	girls
WC Singles	men	women	quad
WC Doubles	men	women	quad
Legends	men	women	seniors
← 1999 ·	Wimbledon Championships	· 2001 →

Three-time defending champion Pete Sampras defeated Patrick Rafter in the final, 6–7^{(10–12)}, 7–6^{(7–5)}, 6–4, 6–2 to win the gentlemen's singles tennis title at the 2000 Wimbledon Championships. It was his seventh and last Wimbledon title (matching William Renshaw's all-time men's singles record) and record 13th major men's singles title overall (surpassing Roy Emerson's all-time record).

With his first round victory against Greg Rusedski, Vince Spadea ended his 21-match losing streak, the longest such streak in the Open Era.

== Seeds ==
1. (United States) Pete Sampras (champion)
2. (United States) Andre Agassi (semifinals)
3. (Sweden) Magnus Norman (second round)
4. (Brazil) Gustavo Kuerten (third round)
5. (Russia) Yevgeny Kafelnikov (second round)
6. (France) Cédric Pioline (second round)
7. (Australia) Lleyton Hewitt (first round)
8. (United Kingdom) Tim Henman (fourth round)
9. (Sweden) Thomas Enqvist (fourth round)
10. (Australia) Mark Philippoussis (quarterfinals)
11. (Netherlands) Richard Krajicek (second round)
12. (Australia) Patrick Rafter (final)
13. (Germany) Nicolas Kiefer (first round)
14. (United Kingdom) Greg Rusedski (first round)
15. (Russia) Marat Safin (second round)
16. (Ecuador) Nicolás Lapentti (first round)

Click on the seed number of a player to go to their draw section.

== Draw ==
=== Key ===
- Q = Qualifier
- WC = Wild card
- LL = Lucky loser
- Alt = Alternate
- ITF = ITF entry
- PR = Protected ranking
- SR = Special ranking
- SE = Special exempt
- JE = Junior exempt
- JR = Junior Accelerator Programme entrant
- CO = College Accelerator Programme entrant
- NG = Next Gen Accelerator Program entrant
- w/o = Walkover
- r = Retired
- d = Defaulted

=== Finals ===
Quarterfinals
1	(United States) Pete Sampras	6	6^{4}	6	6
(United States) Jan-Michael Gambill	4	7^{7}	4	4
(Zimbabwe) Byron Black	6^{2}	6^{2}	4
Q	(Belarus) Vladimir Voltchkov	7^{7}	7^{7}	6
12	(Australia) Patrick Rafter	6	6	7^{7}
(Germany) Alexander Popp	3	2	6^{1}
10	(Australia) Mark Philippoussis	6^{4}	3	4
2	(United States) Andre Agassi	7^{7}	6	6

Semifinals
1	(United States) Pete Sampras	7^{7}	6	6
Q	(Belarus) Vladimir Voltchkov	6^{4}	2	4
12	(Australia) Patrick Rafter	7	4	7	4	6
2	(United States) Andre Agassi	5	6	5	6	3

Final
1	(United States) Pete Sampras	6^{10}	7^{7}	6	6
12	(Australia) Patrick Rafter	7^{12}	6^{5}	4	2

=== Top half ===
==== Section 1 ====
First round
1	(United States) Pete Sampras	6	6	6
(Czech Republic) Jiří Vaněk	4	4	2
(Slovakia) Karol Kučera	6	6	6
LL	(Zimbabwe) Wayne Black	2	2	4
(Morocco) Karim Alami	3	3	1
Q	(France) Michaël Llodra	6	6	6
(United States) Justin Gimelstob	6	6	6^{5}	6
WC	(United Kingdom) Barry Cowan	3	4	7^{7}	3
LL	(Austria) Werner Eschauer	4	4	6	2
(Spain) Alberto Martín	6	6	3	6
(Spain) Fernando Vicente	7^{8}	1	6	2	6
Q	(South Africa) Neville Godwin	6^{6}	6	3	6	8
(Ukraine) Andrei Medvedev	4	3	3
(Sweden) Jonas Björkman	6	6	6
(Czech Republic) Ctislav Doseděl	6	6	0	6
16	(Ecuador) Nicolás Lapentti	3	2	6	1

Second round
1	(United States) P Sampras	7^{11}	3	6	6
(Slovakia) K Kučera	6^{9}	6	3	4
Q	(France) M Llodra	6^{3}	3	4
(United States) J Gimelstob	7^{7}	6	6
(Spain) A Martín	5	4	3
Q	(South Africa) N Godwin	7	6	6
(Sweden) J Björkman	6	6	6
(Czech Republic) C Doseděl	4	3	0

Third round
1	(United States) P Sampras	2	6	6	6
(United States) J Gimelstob	6	4	2	2
Q	(South Africa) N Godwin	3	4	4
(Sweden) J Björkman	6	6	6

Fourth round
1	(United States) P Sampras	6	6	7
(Sweden) J Björkman	3	2	5

==== Section 2 ====
First round
9	(Sweden) Thomas Enqvist	6	6	6
(Germany) Markus Hantschk	1	4	2
(Spain) Francisco Clavet	6	6	6
(Argentina) Hernán Gumy	3	3	3
(Australia) Jason Stoltenberg	3	6	7^{7}	4	4
Q	(Israel) Harel Levy	6	2	6^{3}	6	6
(Chile) Nicolás Massú	5	6	6^{6}	6	3
Q	(Germany) Christian Vinck	7	4	7^{8}	3	6
(France) Julien Boutter	6^{1}	3	4
(United States) Paul Goldstein	7^{7}	6	6
(United States) Jeff Tarango	7^{7}	3	6	6
(France) Sébastien Grosjean	6^{5}	6	4	4
(Italy) Andrea Gaudenzi	3	2	2
(France) Fabrice Santoro	6	6	6
(United States) Jan-Michael Gambill	6	6	7
7	(Australia) Lleyton Hewitt	3	2	5

Second round
9	(Sweden) T Enqvist	7^{7}	7^{8}	7
(Spain) F Clavet	6^{2}	6^{6}	5
Q	(Israel) H Levy	4	6^{2}	5
Q	(Germany) C Vinck	6	7^{7}	7
(United States) P Goldstein	3	6	5	6	12
(United States) J Tarango	6	2	7	2	10
(France) F Santoro	6	4	2	2
(United States) J-M Gambill	4	6	6	6

Third round
9	(Sweden) T Enqvist	6	6^{4}	2	6	6
Q	(Germany) C Vinck	3	7^{7}	6	3	3
(United States) P Goldstein	6^{10}	2	2
(United States) J-M Gambill	7^{12}	6	6

Fourth round
9	(Sweden) T Enqvist	6^{5}	6	3	4
(United States) J-M Gambill	7^{7}	3	6	6

==== Section 3 ====
First round
3	(Sweden) Magnus Norman	6	6	2
WC	(Australia) Mark Woodforde	4	2	0^{r}
(Australia) Richard Fromberg	6	3	6	6^{4}	4
Q	(Belgium) Olivier Rochus	4	6	3	7^{7}	6
(Czech Republic) Jiří Novák	3	4	6	1
(Italy) Gianluca Pozzi	6	6	3	6
Q	(United States) Alex O'Brien	5	6	7	7^{7}
(Croatia) Ivan Ljubičić	7	1	5	6^{4}
(Slovakia) Dominik Hrbatý	6	6	7
(Argentina) Mariano Zabaleta	4	2	5
(Australia) Andrew Ilie	3	7	6^{4}	0
(Zimbabwe) Byron Black	6	5	7^{7}	6
(Spain) Albert Portas	6	6	6
(Czech Republic) Tomáš Zíb	3	4	4
(United States) Vince Spadea	6	6^{5}	6	6^{8}	9
14	(United Kingdom) Greg Rusedski	3	7^{7}	3	7^{10}	7

Second round
3	(Sweden) M Norman	4	6	4	7^{7}	1
Q	(Belgium) O Rochus	6	2	6	6^{4}	6
(Italy) G Pozzi	7^{8}	6	6
Q	(United States) A O'Brien	6^{6}	3	4
(Slovakia) D Hrbatý	3	5	2
(Zimbabwe) B Black	6	7	6
(Spain) A Portas	6	6	6
(United States) V Spadea	4	3	3

Third round
Q	(Belgium) O Rochus	3	6	6^{3}	2
(Italy) G Pozzi	6	3	7^{7}	6
(Zimbabwe) B Black	6	6	6
(Spain) A Portas	2	0	4

Fourth round
(Italy) G Pozzi	6	6^{5}	2	4
(Zimbabwe) B Black	4	7^{7}	6	6

==== Section 4 ====
First round
11	(Netherlands) Richard Krajicek	3	6	6	7^{7}
LL	(Germany) Michael Kohlmann	6	1	4	6^{3}
(South Africa) Wayne Ferreira	6^{6}	6	7^{7}	6
(Australia) Wayne Arthurs	7^{8}	3	6^{5}	1
(Romania) Andrei Pavel	6	6	6
(Spain) Alberto Berasategui	0	4	2
PR	(Canada) Daniel Nestor	4	7^{7}	6	6
WC	(United Kingdom) Miles Maclagan	6	6^{3}	2	4
WC	(United Kingdom) Martin Lee	6	6	7^{7}
(Costa Rica) Juan Antonio Marín	2	4	6^{3}
(Spain) Félix Mantilla	6^{5}	3	4
(Morocco) Younes El Aynaoui	7^{7}	6	6
Q	(Belarus) Vladimir Voltchkov	6^{5}	6	3	6	6
(Argentina) Juan Ignacio Chela	7^{7}	3	6	3	0
(Norway) Christian Ruud	6^{4}	1	6	3
6	(France) Cédric Pioline	7^{7}	6	4	6

Second round
11	(Netherlands) R Krajicek	7	3	3	6^{3}
(South Africa) W Ferreira	5	6	6	7^{7}
(Romania) A Pavel	7^{8}	7	4	6
PR	(Canada) D Nestor	6^{6}	5	6	0
WC	(United Kingdom) M Lee	7^{9}	2	2	2
(Morocco) Y El Aynaoui	6^{7}	6	6	6
Q	(Belarus) V Voltchkov	6	6	2	3	6
6	(France) C Pioline	3	3	6	6	4

Third round
(South Africa) W Ferreira	3	7^{7}	7	6
(Romania) A Pavel	6	6^{3}	5	3
(Morocco) Y El Aynaoui	6^{4}	5	6^{4}
Q	(Belarus) V Voltchkov	7^{7}	7	7^{7}

Fourth round
(South Africa) W Ferreira	3	4	6^{0}
Q	(Belarus) V Voltchkov	6	6	7^{7}

=== Bottom half ===
==== Section 5 ====
First round
5	(Russia) Yevgeny Kafelnikov	7	7	7^{8}
(Switzerland) Roger Federer	5	5	6^{6}
(Sweden) Thomas Johansson	6	6^{5}	6	6
(Brazil) Fernando Meligeni	4	7^{7}	3	2
(Sweden) Magnus Gustafsson	6	6	6
Q	(Australia) Paul Kilderry	4	2	4
(Belarus) Max Mirnyi	6	4
(Czech Republic) Bohdan Ulihrach	2	0^{r}
(Spain) Carlos Moyá	3	7^{7}	3	2
(Germany) Rainer Schüttler	6	6^{5}	6	6
(France) Nicolas Escudé	4	6	6	6
(Argentina) Guillermo Cañas	6	4	1	2
(Netherlands) Jan Siemerink	4	6	6^{4}	2
WC	(Australia) Todd Woodbridge	6	3	7^{7}	6
WC	(United Kingdom) Jamie Delgado	3	6^{7}	1
12	(Australia) Patrick Rafter	6	7^{9}	6

Second round
5	(Russia) Y Kafelnikov	1	6^{0}	4
(Sweden) T Johansson	6	7^{7}	6
(Sweden) M Gustafsson	6	6	6
(Belarus) M Mirnyi	4	3	1
(Germany) R Schüttler	6	7^{7}	7^{7}
(France) N Escudé	4	6^{3}	6^{5}
WC	(Australia) T Woodbridge	3	3	4
12	(Australia) P Rafter	6	6	6

Third round
(Sweden) T Johansson	6^{3}	7^{7}	6	5	6
(Sweden) M Gustafsson	7^{7}	6^{1}	4	7	3
(Germany) R Schüttler	2	6^{2}	3
12	(Australia) P Rafter	6	7^{7}	6

Fourth round
(Sweden) T Johansson	3	4	7^{7}	1
12	(Australia) P Rafter	6	6	6^{4}	6

==== Section 6 ====
First round
13	(Germany) Nicolas Kiefer	7	4	2	3
(Germany) Tommy Haas	5	6	6	6
(Sweden) Andreas Vinciguerra	7^{7}	6	6^{7}	6
(Italy) Laurence Tieleman	6^{4}	1	7^{9}	2
(Switzerland) Marc Rosset	7	6	7^{7}
(Argentina) Franco Squillari	5	3	6^{4}
(Brazil) André Sá	7^{7}	3	6	2	3
WC	(United Kingdom) Arvind Parmar	6^{2}	6	4	6	6
(United States) Ronald Agénor	6	5	6^{10}	2
(Germany) Alexander Popp	0	7	7^{12}	6
(United States) Michael Chang	6	6	6
(Argentina) Gastón Gaudio	2	3	2
(Italy) Davide Sanguinetti	3	6^{1}	6	6^{1}
Q	(South Africa) Justin Bower	6	7^{7}	4	7^{7}
(United States) Chris Woodruff	4	7^{7}	5	6^{5}
4	(Brazil) Gustavo Kuerten	6	6^{5}	7	7^{7}

Second round
(Germany) T Haas	6	7^{7}	6
(Sweden) A Vinciguerra	3	6^{3}	3
(Switzerland) M Rosset	7^{7}	7	6
WC	(United Kingdom) A Parmar	6^{4}	5	3
(Germany) A Popp	7^{7}	4	6^{3}	6	8
(United States) M Chang	6^{5}	6	7^{7}	3	6
Q	(South Africa) J Bower	4	4	5
4	(Brazil) G Kuerten	6	6	7

Third round
(Germany) T Haas	4	6	3	6	7
(Switzerland) M Rosset	6	3	6	3	9
(Germany) A Popp	7^{8}	6	6
4	(Brazil) G Kuerten	6^{6}	2	1

Fourth round
(Switzerland) M Rosset	1	4	6	6	1
(Germany) A Popp	6	6	3	4	6

==== Section 7 ====
First round
8	(United Kingdom) Tim Henman	5	6	6	6
(Thailand) Paradorn Srichaphan	7	3	1	3
(Croatia) Goran Ivanišević	3	6	3	4
(France) Arnaud Clément	6	3	6	6
(Morocco) Hicham Arazi	6	6	6
Q	(Italy) Igor Gaudi	2	4	0
Q	(United States) Michael Russell	6^{6}	2	6	2
LL	(Canada) Sébastien Lareau	7^{8}	6	1	6
(Netherlands) Sjeng Schalken	6	6	6
(Switzerland) George Bastl	2	4	2
(Belgium) Christophe Rochus	4	7^{9}	6	4	6
(Sweden) Mikael Tillström	6	6^{7}	2	6	1
(Austria) Markus Hipfl	6	4	4	7^{7}	1
(France) Arnaud Di Pasquale	4	6	6	6^{5}	6
Q	(Austria) Jürgen Melzer	4	6^{3}	7	4
10	(Australia) Mark Philippoussis	6	7^{7}	5	6

Second round
8	(United Kingdom) T Henman	6	6	6
(France) A Clément	4	4	4
(Morocco) H Arazi	6	3	6^{6}	6	9
LL	(Canada) S Lareau	3	6	7^{8}	4	7
(Netherlands) S Schalken	6	6	6
(Belgium) C Rochus	4	3	1
(France) A Di Pasquale	6	6^{0}	3	0
10	(Australia) M Philippoussis	4	7^{7}	6	6

Third round
8	(United Kingdom) T Henman	6	6	6
(Morocco) H Arazi	3	3	3
(Netherlands) S Schalken	6	3	7^{9}	6^{4}	18
10	(Australia) M Philippoussis	4	6	6^{7}	7^{7}	20

Fourth round
8	(United Kingdom) T Henman	1	7	7^{11}	3	4
10	(Australia) M Philippoussis	6	5	6^{9}	6	6

==== Section 8 ====
First round
15	(Russia) Marat Safin	7^{7}	6	6
(Spain) Galo Blanco	6^{2}	3	4
Q	(Australia) Dejan Petrović	1	4	1
(Czech Republic) Martin Damm	6	6	6
Q	(Germany) David Prinosil	2	6	6	6
(Armenia) Sargis Sargsian	6	1	2	4
WC	(India) Mahesh Bhupathi	7^{7}	3	6^{4}	1
Q	(France) Stéphane Huet	6^{5}	6	7^{7}	6
LL	(France) Cyril Saulnier	5	4	4
(France) Jérôme Golmard	7	6	6
(Romania) Adrian Voinea	3^{r}
(Austria) Stefan Koubek	3
LL	(Sweden) Fredrik Jonsson	6^{7}	6^{1}	2
(United States) Todd Martin	7^{9}	7^{7}	6
Q	(United States) Taylor Dent	6	3	0	0^{r}
2	(United States) Andre Agassi	2	6	6	4

Second round
15	(Russia) M Safin	5	6^{4}	3
(Czech Republic) M Damm	7	7^{7}	6
Q	(Germany) D Prinosil	6	2	6	6
Q	(France) S Huet	4	6	1	2
(France) J Golmard	7^{7}	4	6	6
(Austria) S Koubek	6^{4}	6	1	2
(United States) T Martin	4	6	6^{3}	6	8
2	(United States) A Agassi	6	2	7^{7}	2	10

Third round
(Czech Republic) M Damm	6^{2}	6	6^{0}	4
Q	(Germany) D Prinosil	7^{7}	3	7^{7}	6
(France) J Golmard	3	3	4
2	(United States) A Agassi	6	6	6

Fourth round
Q	(Germany) D Prinosil	4	3	3
2	(United States) A Agassi	6	6	6

Preceded by 2000 French Open – Men's singles	Grand Slam men's singles	Succeeded by 2000 US Open – Men's singles
