= Dominique Coene =

Belgian tennis player

- Country (sports): Belgium
- Born: 23 January 1982 (age 44)
- Plays: Right-handed (two-handed backhand)
- Prize money: $40,435

Singles
- Career record: 0–0 (at ATP Tour level, Grand Slam level, and in Davis Cup)
- Career titles: 0
- Highest ranking: No. 406 (Mar 4 2002)

Doubles
- Career record: 0–0 (at ATP Tour level, Grand Slam level, and in Davis Cup)
- Career titles: 0
- Highest ranking: No. 324 (Oct 24 2005)
- Last updated on: January 12 2026.

Dominique Coene (born 23 January 1982) is a Belgian former professional tennis player.

Coene, who comes from Flanders, began competing in tennis at the age of eight and was the boys' doubles champion at the 2000 Wimbledon Championships (with Kristof Vliegen). He won Belgium's national championships in 2001 and 2003. On the professional tour he attained a best singles world ranking of 406, with two ITF Futures titles. After retiring from the tour in 2006 he played provincial league football with his local club FC Kleit Maldegem.

== ATP Challenger and ITF Futures finals ==
=== Singles: 6 (2–4) ===
Legend (singles) ATP Challenger Tour (0–0) ITF Futures Tour (2–4)	Finals by surface Hard (0–0) Clay (1–4) Grass (0–0) Carpet (1–0)

Result	W–L	Date	Tournament	Tier	Surface	Opponent	Score
Win	1–0	Jan 2002	France F2, Angers	Futures	Clay	(France) Jérôme Hanquez	6–2, 6–4
Loss	1–1	Aug 2003	Latvia F1, Jūrmala	Futures	Clay	(Sweden) Daniel Klemetz	4–6, 6–7^{(6–8)}
Loss	1–2	May 2004	Bosnia & Herzegovina F2, Brčko District	Futures	Clay	(Serbia) Ilija Bozoljac	3–6, 6–3, 3–6
Loss	1–3	Aug 2004	Italy F22, Rome	Futures	Clay	(United Kingdom) Andy Murray	0–6, 3–6
Win	2–3	Oct 2004	Belgium F1, Waterloo	Futures	Carpet	(Italy) Simone Bolelli	6–2, 6–3
Loss	2–4	Jun 2006	Netherlands F2, Alkmaar	Futures	Clay	(Netherlands) Nick van der Meer	4–6, 4–6

=== Doubles: 8 (5–3) ===
Result	W–L	Date	Tournament	Surface	Partner	Opponents	Score
Loss	0–1	Jul 2004	Romania F9, Balș	Clay	(Argentina) Juan-Martín Aranguren	(Romania) Gabriel Moraru (Romania) Horia Tecău	0–6, 6–4, 2–6
Loss	0–2	Nov 2004	Belgium F2, Sint-Katelijne-Waver	Hard	(Netherlands) Djalmar Sistermans	(Belgium) Jeroen Masson (Belgium) Stefan Wauters	6–3, 1–6, 3–6
Win	1–2	Jun 2005	Netherlands F1, Alkmaar	Clay	(Belgium) Stefan Wauters	(Germany) Denis Gremelmayr (Germany) Philipp Marx	7–5, 6–1
Loss	1–3	Jul 2005	Netherlands F2, Heerhugowaard	Clay	(Netherlands) Jasper Smit	(Colombia) Pablo González (Argentina) Nicolás Todero	6–2, 3–6, 2–6
Win	2–3	Jul 2005	Germany F8, Düsseldorf	Clay	(Russia) Yevgeniy Korolev	(Germany) Tobias Clemens (Germany) Ralph Grambow	3–6, 6–2, 6–0
Win	3–3	Apr 2006	France F7, Angers	Clay	(Russia) Yevgeniy Korolev	(Australia) Rameez Junaid (Australia) Joseph Sirianni	6–2, 6–4
Win	4–3	Jun 2006	Netherlands F2, Alkmaar	Clay	(France) Jonathan Dasnières de Veigy	(Netherlands) Romano Frantzen (Netherlands) Nick van der Meer	6–1, 2–6, 7–6^{(5)}
Win	5–3	Jul 2006	Netherlands F3, Heerhugowaard	Clay	(Netherlands) Robin Haase	(Germany) Martin Emmrich (Switzerland) Sven Swinnen	2–6, 6–3, 6–3

== Junior Grand Slam finals ==
=== Doubles: 1 (1 title) ===
Result	Year	Tournament	Surface	Partner	Opponents	Score
Win	2000	Wimbledon	Grass	(Belgium) Kristof Vliegen	(United Kingdom) Andrew Banks (United Kingdom) Benjamin Riby	6–3, 1–6, 6–3
