= María José López Herrera =

Mexican tennis player

- Country (sports): Mexico
- Born: 9 October 1984 (age 40); San Luis Potosí, Mexico
- Plays: Right-handed
- Prize money: $12,605

Singles
- Career record: 24–36
- Highest ranking: No. 450 (13 December 2004)

Doubles
- Career record: 13–20
- Career titles: 1 ITF
- Highest ranking: No. 431 (7 March 2005)

María José López Herrera (born 9 October 1984) is a Mexican former professional tennis player.

Born in San Luis Potosí, López Herrera was a world No. 18 junior and a girls' doubles semifinalist at Wimbledon.

López Herrera, who represented Mexico in the Fed Cup in 2001 and 2002, had two main-draw appearances as a wildcard at the WTA Tour's Mexican Open. She fell in the first round on both occasions.

== ITF finals ==
=== Singles (0–1) ===
Result	Date	Tournament	Surface	Opponent	Score
Loss	5 September 2004	Mexico City	Hard	(United States) Julia Cohen	4–6, 4–6

=== Doubles (1–0) ===
Result	Date	Tournament	Surface	Partner	Opponents	Score
Win	24 June 2001	Canet-en-Roussillon, France	Clay	(Russia) Raissa Gourevitch	(Spain) Sonia Delgado (Spain) Veronica Rizhik	4–6, 7–5, 6–4
