= Kristof Vliegen =

Belgian tennis player (born 1982)

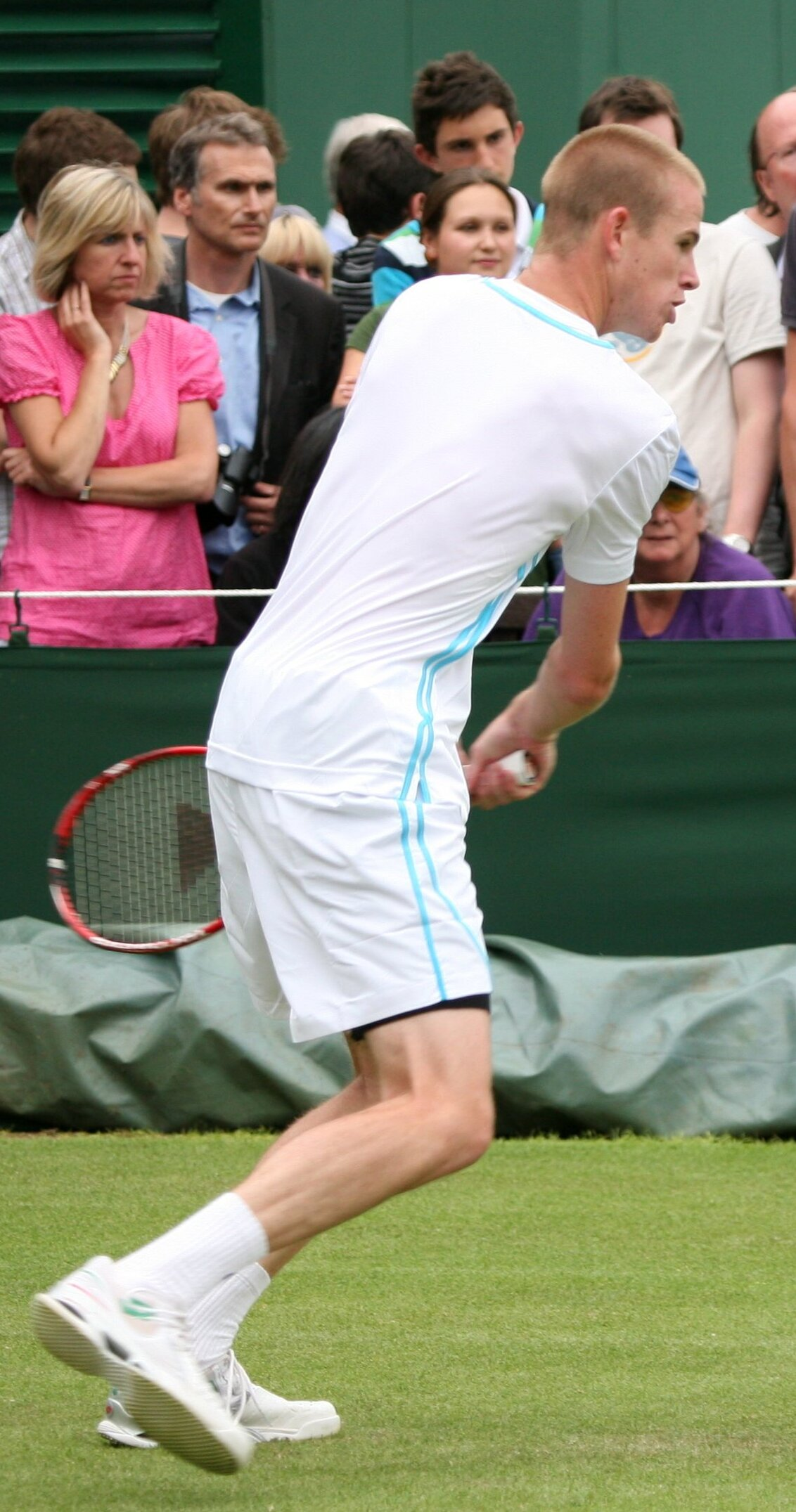
- Country (sports): Belgium
- Residence: Maaseik, Belgium
- Born: 22 June 1982 (age 43) Maaseik, Belgium
- Height: 1.93 m (6 ft 4 in)
- Turned pro: 2001
- Retired: 2011
- Plays: Right-handed (two-handed backhand)
- Prize money: $1,964,020

Singles
- Career record: 89–122
- Career titles: 0
- Highest ranking: No. 30 (30 October 2006)

Grand Slam singles results
- Australian Open: 3R (2006)
- French Open: 3R (2007)
- Wimbledon: 2R (2006, 2007, 2009)
- US Open: 1R (2003, 2004, 2006, 2007, 2010)

Doubles
- Career record: 40–51
- Career titles: 0
- Highest ranking: No. 49 (11 June 2007)

Grand Slam doubles results
- Australian Open: 2R (2006, 2007, 2008)
- French Open: 3R (2007)
- Wimbledon: 2R (2006, 2007)
- US Open: 3R (2006)
- Last updated on: 21 August 2021.

Kristof Vliegen (born 22 June 1982) is a Belgian tennis coach and a former professional player.

== Personal information ==
He is not related to fellow Belgian tennis player Joran Vliegen.

== Coaching ==
He coached Zizou Bergs until May 2025. He is currently coaching Alex Michelsen since October 2025.

== Career ==
=== 2001 ===
Vliegen turned professional in 2001.

=== 2006 ===
Vliegen was a semifinalist in Chennai in 2006 and in May of the same year, in May of the same year, he reached the final of the ATP tournament in Munich, setting up the first all-Belgian men's singles final against Olivier Rochus. He was also the 30th seed at the 2006 Wimbledon Championships, where he reached the 2nd round before losing to Nicolas Mahut in straight sets.

=== 2009 ===
In Doha, the first tournament of the year he defeated Spaniard Óscar Hernández with 6–1, 6–7 and 6–7. In the next round he faced German Philipp Kohlschreiber. He was defeated in three sets 4–6, 7–6 and 6–4. At the Australian open he met Italian Simone Bolelli but lost in three long sets 6–7, 5–7 and 6–7. One week later he started in the SA Tennis Open as the seventh seed. In the first round he won in two straight sets of unranked Ross Hutchins. In the next round he defeated Czech Jan Minář. In the quarterfinals he lost to world number 6 Jo-Wilfried Tsonga in straight sets 4–6 and 1–6. At the Open 13 in Marseille he faced Czech Jan Hernych in the first round but lost in three sets: 6–3, 3–6 and 6–4.

== ATP career finals ==
=== Singles: 2 (2 runner-ups) ===
Legend Grand Slam tournaments (0–0) ATP World Tour Finals (0–0) ATP World Tour Masters 1000 (0–0) ATP World Tour 500 Series (0–0) ATP World Tour 250 Series (0–2)	Titles by surface Hard (0–1) Clay (0–1) Grass (0–0) Carpet (0–0)	Titles by setting Outdoor (0–2) Indoor (0–0)

Result	W–L	Date	Tournament	Tier	Surface	Opponent	Score
Loss	0–1	Jan 2003	Adelaide, Australia	International Series	Hard	(Russia) Nikolay Davydenko	2–6, 6–7^{(3–7)}
Loss	0–2	May 2006	Munich, Germany	International Series	Clay	(Belgium) Olivier Rochus	4–6, 2–6

=== Doubles: 2 (2 runner-ups) ===
Legend Grand Slam tournaments (0–0) ATP World Tour Finals (0–0) ATP World Tour Masters 1000 (0–0) ATP World Tour 500 Series (0–0) ATP World Tour 250 Series (0–2)	Titles by surface Hard (0–2) Clay (0–0) Grass (0–0) Carpet (0–0)	Titles by setting Outdoor (0–2) Indoor (0–0)

Result	W–L	Date	Tournament	Tier	Surface	Partner	Opponents	Score
Loss	0–1	Oct 2006	Stockholm, Sweden	International Series	Hard	(Belgium) Olivier Rochus	(Australia) Paul Hanley (South Africa) Kevin Ullyett	6–7^{(2–7)}, 4–6
Loss	0–2	Jul 2010	Atlanta, United States	250 Series	Hard	(India) Rohan Bopanna	(United States) Scott Lipsky (United States) Rajeev Ram	3–6, 7–6^{(7–4)}, [10–12]

== ATP Challenger and ITF Futures finals ==
=== Singles: 16 (11–5) ===
Legend ATP Challenger (9–4) ITF Futures (2–1)	Finals by surface Hard (5–1) Clay (6–4) Grass (0–0) Carpet (0–0)

Result	W–L	Date	Tournament	Tier	Surface	Opponent	Score
Loss	0–1	Aug 2001	Luxembourg F2, Luxembourg	Futures	Clay	(France) Jordane Doble	4–4 ret.
Win	1–1	Mar 2002	France F6, Lille	Futures	Hard	(United Kingdom) Jérôme Haehnel	7–6^{(7–3)}, 7–6^{(7–3)}
Win	2–1	Jun 2002	Germany F6, Oberweier	Futures	Clay	(Germany) Daniel Elsner	6–1, 1–0 ret.
Win	3–1	Aug 2002	Geneva, Switzerland	Challenger	Clay	(Spain) Galo Blanco	6–2, 6–2
Win	4–1	May 2003	Zagreb, Croatia	Challenger	Clay	(Spain) Rubén Ramírez Hidalgo	6–1, 4–6, 6–0
Win	5–1	Oct 2003	Groningen, Netherlands	Challenger	Hard	(Sweden) Joachim Johansson	6–4, 6–4
Loss	5–2	Apr 2004	Barcelona, Spain	Challenger	Clay	(Switzerland) Stan Wawrinka	4–6, 3–6
Loss	5–3	Apr 2005	Paget, Bermuda	Challenger	Clay	(Czech Republic) Tomáš Zíb	7–6^{(10–8)}, 6–7^{(6–8)}, 1–6
Loss	5–4	Jul 2005	Scheveningen, Netherlands	Challenger	Clay	(Netherlands) Melle van Gemerden	4–6, 3–6
Loss	5–5	Oct 2007	Mons, Belgium	Challenger	Hard	(Latvia) Ernests Gulbis	5–7, 3–6
Win	6–5	Feb 2008	Wrocław, Poland	Challenger	Hard	(Austria) Jürgen Melzer	6–4, 3–6, 6–3
Win	7–5	Aug 2008	Geneva, Switzerland	Challenger	Clay	(Kazakhstan) Yuri Schukin	6–2, 6–1
Win	8–5	Sep 2008	Düsseldorf, Germany	Challenger	Clay	(Germany) Andreas Beck	6–0, 6–3
Win	9–5	Sep 2008	Grenoble, France	Challenger	Hard	(France) Alexandre Sidorenko	6–4, 6–3
Win	10–5	Mar 2009	Besançon, France	Challenger	Hard	(Germany) Andreas Beck	6–2, 6–7^{(8–10)}, 6–3
Win	11–5	Jul 2009	Scheveningen, Netherlands	Challenger	Clay	(Spain) Albert Montañés	4–2 ret.

=== Doubles: 10 (7–3) ===
Legend ATP Challenger (4–3) ITF Futures (3–0)	Finals by surface Hard (1–2) Clay (6–1) Grass (0–0) Carpet (0–0)

Result	W–L	Date	Tournament	Tier	Surface	Partner	Opponents	Score
Win	1–0	Jan 2001	France F2, Angers	Futures	Clay	(Belgium) Wim Neefs	(Belarus) Vitali Shvets (Socialist Federal Republic of Yugoslavia) Relja Dulic-Fiser	6–1, 6–3
Win	2–0	Feb 2001	France F4, Deauville	Futures	Clay	(Belgium) Wim Neefs	(Finland) Kim Tiilikainen (Germany) Jan Weinzierl	6–3, 7–6^{(7–3)}
Win	3–0	Aug 2001	Netherlands F1, Enschede	Futures	Clay	(Belgium) Stefan Wauters	(Netherlands) Bart De Gier (Netherlands) Michel Koning	7–6^{(7–4)}, 6–1
Win	4–0	Mar 2005	Barletta, Italy	Challenger	Clay	(Belgium) Tom Vanhoudt	(Russia) Yuri Schukin (Czech Republic) Lukáš Dlouhý	6–4, 5–7, 7–5
Loss	4–1	Jul 2005	Scheveningen, Netherlands	Challenger	Clay	(Belgium) Steve Darcis	(France) Julien Benneteau (France) Édouard Roger-Vasselin	7–5, 5–7, 6–7^{(5–7)}
Win	5–1	Mar 2007	Sunrise, United States	Challenger	Hard	(Greece) Konstantinos Economidis	(Argentina) Sebastián Prieto (Argentina) Juan Martín del Potro	6–3, 6–4
Loss	5–2	Aug 2007	Istanbul, Turkey	Challenger	Hard	(Belgium) Dick Norman	(United Kingdom) James Auckland (United Kingdom) Ross Hutchins	7–5, 6–7^{(5–7)}, [7–10]
Loss	5–3	Mar 2008	Sunrise, United States	Challenger	Hard	(Netherlands) Peter Wessels	(Serbia) Janko Tipsarević (Serbia) Dušan Vemić	2–6, 6–7^{(6–8)}
Win	6–3	Aug 2008	Freudenstadt, Germany	Challenger	Clay	(Belgium) Dick Norman	(Austria) Rainer Eitzinger (Austria) Armin Sandbichler	6–3, 6–3
Win	7–3	May 2010	Tunis, Tunisia	Challenger	Clay	(South Africa) Jeff Coetzee	(United States) James Cerretani (Canada) Adil Shamasdin	7–6^{(7–3)}, 6–3

== Junior Grand Slam finals ==
=== Doubles: 1 (1 title) ===
Result	Year	Tournament	Surface	Partner	Opponents	Score
Win	2000	Wimbledon Championships	Grass	(Belgium) Dominique Coene	(United Kingdom) Andrew Banks (United Kingdom) Benjamin Riby	6–3, 1–6, 6–3

== Performance timelines ==
Key
W	F	SF	QF	#R	RR	Q#	P#	DNQ	A	Z#	PO	G	S	B	NMS	NTI	P	NH

(W) winner; (F) finalist; (SF) semifinalist; (QF) quarterfinalist; (#R) rounds 4, 3, 2, 1; (RR) round-robin stage; (Q#) qualification round; (P#) preliminary round; (DNQ) did not qualify; (A) absent; (Z#) Davis/Fed Cup Zonal Group (with number indication) or (PO) play-off; (G) gold, (S) silver or (B) bronze Olympic/Paralympic medal; (NMS) not a Masters tournament; (NTI) not a Tier I tournament; (P) postponed; (NH) not held; (SR) strike rate (events won / competed); (W–L) win–loss record.
To avoid confusion and double counting, these charts are updated at the conclusion of a tournament or when the player's participation has ended.

=== Singles ===
Tournament	2003	2004	2005	2006	2007	2008	2009	2010	SR	W–L	Win %
Grand Slam tournaments
Australian Open	Q2	Q3	Q1	3R	1R	2R	1R	1R	0 / 5	3–5	38%
French Open	Q1	1R	2R	1R	3R	1R	1R	1R	0 / 7	3–7	30%
Wimbledon	Q1	1R	Q1	2R	2R	1R	2R	1R	0 / 6	3–6	33%
US Open	1R	1R	Q1	1R	1R	A	A	1R	0 / 5	0–5	0%
Win–loss	0–1	0–3	1–1	3–4	3–4	1–3	1–3	0–4	0 / 23	9–23	28%
ATP World Tour Masters 1000
Indian Wells	A	A	A	2R	1R	A	A	A	0 / 2	1–2	33%
Miami	Q2	A	A	3R	1R	1R	A	A	0 / 3	2–3	40%
Monte Carlo	A	A	A	3R	3R	2R	1R	A	0 / 4	5–4	56%
Madrid	A	1R	A	3R	Q2	A	A	A	0 / 2	2–2	50%
Rome	Q2	A	A	A	Q1	A	A	A	0 / 0	0–0	–
Hamburg	A	A	A	2R	Q1	1R	NMS		0 / 2	1–2	33%
Canada Masters	A	A	A	1R	A	A	A	A	0 / 1	0–1	0%
Cincinnati	A	A	A	2R	A	A	A	A	0 / 1	1–1	50%
Paris	A	Q1	2R	2R	Q2	Q1	A	A	0 / 2	2–2	50%
Win–loss	0–0	0–1	1–1	10–8	2–3	1–3	0–1	0–0	0 / 17	14–17	45%

=== Doubles ===
Tournament	2003	2004	2005	2006	2007	2008	2009	2010	SR	W–L	Win %
Grand Slam tournaments
Australian Open	A	A	A	2R	2R	2R	1R	1R	0 / 5	3–5	38%
French Open	2R	A	A	2R	3R	1R	A	1R	0 / 5	4–5	44%
Wimbledon	Q1	A	A	2R	2R	1R	A	1R	0 / 4	2–4	33%
US Open	A	A	A	3R	2R	A	A	1R	0 / 3	3–3	50%
Win–loss	1–1	0–0	0–0	5–4	5–4	1–3	0–1	0–4	0 / 17	12–17	41%
