= Adam Kennedy (tennis) =

Australian tennis player

- Country (sports): Australia
- Born: 9 February 1983 (age 42)
- Plays: Right-handed
- Prize money: $44,468

Singles
- Career record: 0–3
- Highest ranking: No. 358 (19 May 2003)

Grand Slam singles results
- Australian Open: Q2 (2003)

Doubles
- Career record: 0–1
- Highest ranking: No. 428 (16 February 2004)

Grand Slam doubles results
- Australian Open: 1R (2004)

Adam Kennedy (born 9 February 1983) is an Australian former professional tennis player.

A top ranked Australian junior, Kennedy was trained at the Bollettieri Academy in Florida.

Kennedy, who played right-handed, spent most of his career on the ITF circuit, reaching a career high singles ranking of 358 in the world. During his career he featured in the main draw of three ATP Tour tournaments, the first as a qualifier at Newport in 2002. The following year he received a wildcard to compete in the AAPT Championships in Adelaide and also played in Los Angeles, where he lost to fifth seed Mark Philippoussis in the first round.

From 2002 to 2004 he appeared in the qualifying draws for the Australian Open. As a doubles player he played in the main draw of the 2004 Australian Open, as a wildcard pairing with Todd Reid.
