= Andrew Banks (tennis) =

British tennis player

- Country (sports): United Kingdom
- Born: 6 January 1983 (age 42)
- Plays: Left-handed
- Prize money: $39,626

Singles
- Career record: 0–0
- Career titles: 0
- Highest ranking: No. 326 (31 January 2005)

Grand Slam singles results
- Wimbledon: Q2 (2002, 2005)

Doubles
- Career record: 0–2
- Career titles: 0
- Highest ranking: No. 543 (1 August 2005)

Grand Slam doubles results
- Wimbledon: 1R (2004, 2005)
- Last updated on: 21 August 2021.

Andrew "Andy" Banks (born 6 January 1983) is a British former professional tennis player.

A left-handed player from Wakefield, Banks was a British 18-and-under champion and reached the junior doubles final of the 2000 Wimbledon Championships.

Banks featured in the men's singles qualifying draw at Wimbledon on four occasions and twice received a wildcard into the doubles main draw, in 2004 and 2005.

== Junior Grand Slam finals ==
=== Doubles: 1 (1 runner-up) ===
Result	Year	Tournament	Surface	Partner	Opponents	Score
Loss	2001	Wimbledon	Grass	(United Kingdom) Benjamin Riby	(Belgium) Dominique Coene (Belgium) Kristof Vliegen	3–6, 6–1, 3–6

== ATP Challenger and ITF Futures finals ==
=== Singles: 2 (2–0) ===
Legend ATP Challenger (0–0) ITF Futures (2–0)	Finals by surface Hard (2–0) Clay (0–0) Grass (0–0) Carpet (0–0)

Result	W–L	Date	Tournament	Tier	Surface	Opponent	Score
Win	1–0	Mar 2004	Greece F1, Athens	Futures	Hard	(Belgium) Jeroen Masson	6–2, 6–7^{(7–9)}, 6–4
Win	2–0	Jan 2005	Great Britain F1, Leeds	Futures	Hard	(United States) Travis Rettenmaier	7–6^{(7–5)}, 1–6, 6–4

=== Doubles: 1 (1–0) ===
Legend ATP Challenger (0–0) ITF Futures (1–0)	Finals by surface Hard (1–0) Clay (0–0) Grass (0–0) Carpet (0–0)

Result	W–L	Date	Tournament	Tier	Surface	Partner	Opponents	Score
Win	1–0	Nov 2003	Jamaica F13 Kingston	Futures	Hard	(United Kingdom) Jonathan Marray	(Sweden) Jacob Adaktusson (Puerto Rico) Gabriel Montilla	6–4, 6–3
