= 1997 French Open – Women's singles qualifying =

Women's singles qualifying
- 1997 French Open

Events
Singles	men	women		boys	girls
Doubles	men	women	mixed	boys	girls
WC Singles	men	women	quad
WC Doubles	men	women	quad
Legends	−45	45+	women

Qualification
Singles	men	women
- French Open

Players who neither had high enough rankings nor received wild cards to enter the main draw of the annual French Open Tennis Championships participated in a qualifying tournament held in the week before the event.

== Seeds ==
1. (Spain) María Sánchez Lorenzo (first round)
2. (South Africa) Joannette Kruger (qualified)
3. -
4. (United States) Corina Morariu (qualifying competition)
5. (Czech Republic) Eva Martincová (qualifying competition)
6. (Australia) Kerry-Anne Guse (first round)
7. (South Korea) Park Sung-hee (qualified)
8. (United States) Sandra Cacic (qualified)
9. (Slovenia) Barbara Mulej (second round)
10. (Germany) Marketa Kochta (qualified)
11. (United Kingdom) Samantha Smith (first round)
12. (United States) Janet Lee (qualified)
13. (Belgium) Nancy Feber (qualifying competition)
14. (Canada) Sonya Jeyaseelan (qualified)
15. (Italy) Laura Golarsa (qualified)
16. (Austria) Sylvia Plischke (first round)
17. (Germany) Marlene Weingärtner (qualifying competition)

== Qualifiers ==
1. (Italy) Laura Golarsa
2. (Germany) Marketa Kochta
3. (United States) Janet Lee
4. (United States) Sandra Cacic
5. (South Korea) Park Sung-hee
6. (Canada) Sonya Jeyaseelan
7. (France) Emmanuelle Curutchet
8. (South Africa) Joannette Kruger

== Qualifying draw ==
Key

- Q = Qualifier
- WC = Wild card
- LL = Lucky loser
- Alt = Alternate
- ITF = ITF entry
- PR = Protected ranking
- SR = Special ranking
- SE = Special exempt
- JE = Junior exempt
- JR = Junior Accelerator Programme entrant
- CO = College Accelerator Programme entrant
- NG = Next Gen Accelerator Program entrant
- w/o = Walkover
- r = Retired
- d = Defaulted

=== First qualifier ===
First round
1	(Spain) María Sánchez Lorenzo	3	7	4
(Czech Republic) Radka Bobková	6	5	6
(United States) Meghann Shaughnessy	7	2	3
(Slovenia) Tina Križan	5	6	6
PR	(Austria) Petra Schwarz	2	6	3
(Spain) Laura Pena	6	2	6
(Romania) Raluca Sandu	4	6	2
15	(Italy) Laura Golarsa	6	3	6

Second round
(Czech Republic) Radka Bobková	6	6^{3}	1
(Slovenia) Tina Križan	3	7^{7}	6
(Spain) Laura Pena	7	3	1
15	(Italy) Laura Golarsa	5	6	6

Qualifying competition
(Slovenia) Tina Križan	5	2
15	(Italy) Laura Golarsa	7	6

=== Second qualifier ===
First round
10	(Germany) Marketa Kochta	6	6
WC	(France) Kildine Chevalier	2	3
Alt	(Czech Republic) Alena Vašková	6	4	6
(Madagascar) Dally Randriantefy	3	6	3
(Australia) Siobhan Drake-Brockman	6	6
(Italy) Natalia Baudone-Furlan	4	0
(Venezuela) Melissa Mazzotta	6	4	1
5	(Czech Republic) Eva Martincová	3	6	6

Second round
10	(Germany) Marketa Kochta	6	6
Alt	(Czech Republic) Alena Vašková	1	3
(Australia) Siobhan Drake-Brockman	3	3
5	(Czech Republic) Eva Martincová	6	6

Qualifying competition
10	(Germany) Marketa Kochta	6	6
5	(Czech Republic) Eva Martincová	4	4

=== Third qualifier ===
First round
4	(United States) Corina Morariu	6	6
(Japan) Haruka Inoue	4	4
WC	(France) Sophie Georges	6	6
(Hungary) Rita Kuti-Kis	3	3
(Australia) Nicole Pratt	3	6	6
(Czech Republic) Ludmila Varmužová	6	4	2
(Bulgaria) Svetlana Krivencheva	1	2
12	(United States) Janet Lee	6	6

Second round
4	(United States) Corina Morariu	5	7	7
WC	(France) Sophie Georges	7	5	5
(Australia) Nicole Pratt	1	3
12	(United States) Janet Lee	6	6

Qualifying competition
4	(United States) Corina Morariu	3	2
12	(United States) Janet Lee	6	6

=== Fourth qualifier ===
First round
13	(Belgium) Nancy Feber	6	7^{7}
(United States) Lindsay Lee-Waters	4	6^{2}
WC	(France) Ségolène Berger	7^{7}	2	3
(Argentina) Bettina Fulco	6^{4}	6	6
(Hungary) Petra Gáspár	2	6	6
(Luxembourg) Anne Kremer	6	4	3
(Germany) Sandra Klösel	1	2
8	(United States) Sandra Cacic	6	6

Second round
13	(Belgium) Nancy Feber	7	6
(Argentina) Bettina Fulco	5	3
(Hungary) Petra Gáspár	7^{7}	3	2
8	(United States) Sandra Cacic	6^{4}	6	6

Qualifying competition
13	(Belgium) Nancy Feber	2	0
8	(United States) Sandra Cacic	6	6

=== Fifth qualifier ===
First round
7	(South Korea) Park Sung-hee	6	7^{7}
(India) Nirupama Sanjeev	4	6^{5}
(Germany) Miriam Schnitzer	2	4
(United States) Erika deLone	6	6
(Hungary) Virág Csurgó	6	5	4
(Colombia) Fabiola Zuluaga	3	7	6
(Ukraine) Elena Brioukhovets	6	6
11	(United Kingdom) Samantha Smith	2	0

Second round
7	(South Korea) Park Sung-hee	6	7
(United States) Erika deLone	3	5
(Colombia) Fabiola Zuluaga	6	4	6
(Ukraine) Elena Brioukhovets	2	6	3

Qualifying competition
7	(South Korea) Park Sung-hee	6	6
(Colombia) Fabiola Zuluaga	3	1

=== Sixth qualifier ===
First round
14	(Canada) Sonya Jeyaseelan	6	6
(Italy) Adriana Serra Zanetti	2	0
(Germany) Veronika Martinek	6	7
(South Africa) Liezel Horn	0	5
PR	(China) Li Fang	1	6	6
(Poland) Katarzyna Nowak	6	2	3
(Sweden) Kristina Triska	4	6^{8}
17	(Germany) Marlene Weingärtner	6	7^{10}

Second round
14	(Canada) Sonya Jeyaseelan	6	7
(Germany) Veronika Martinek	2	5
PR	(China) Li Fang	5	2
17	(Germany) Marlene Weingärtner	7	6

Qualifying competition
14	(Canada) Sonya Jeyaseelan	3	6	6
17	(Germany) Marlene Weingärtner	6	0	1

=== Seventh qualifier ===
First round
6	(Australia) Kerry-Anne Guse	2	2
(Netherlands) Seda Noorlander	6	6
(Argentina) María José Gaidano	4	7^{7}	6
(United States) Katrina Adams	6	6^{5}	3
WC	(France) Emmanuelle Curutchet	6	1	6
(Paraguay) Larissa Schaerer	4	6	1
(Ukraine) Elena Tatarkova	6	3	6
16	(Austria) Sylvia Plischke	4	6	3

Second round
(Netherlands) Seda Noorlander	1	4
(Argentina) María José Gaidano	6	6
WC	(France) Emmanuelle Curutchet	6	6
(Ukraine) Elena Tatarkova	3	2

Qualifying competition
(Argentina) María José Gaidano	2	3
WC	(France) Emmanuelle Curutchet	6	6

=== Eighth qualifier ===
First round
9	(Slovenia) Barbara Mulej	6	6
WC	(France) Cécile de Winne	1	1
(Portugal) Sofia Prazeres	4	6	6
(Austria) Melanie Schnell	6	2	1
(Socialist Federal Republic of Yugoslavia) Tatjana Ječmenica	6	6
WC	(France) Virginie Buisson	2	1
WC	(France) Edith Nunes-Bersot	4	3
2	(South Africa) Joannette Kruger	6	6

Second round
9	(Slovenia) Barbara Mulej	3	4
(Portugal) Sofia Prazeres	6	6
(Socialist Federal Republic of Yugoslavia) Tatjana Ječmenica	1	1
2	(South Africa) Joannette Kruger	6	6

Qualifying competition
(Portugal) Sofia Prazeres	6	5	5
2	(South Africa) Joannette Kruger	4	7	7
