= 2000 French Open – Women's singles qualifying =

Women's singles qualifying
- 2000 French Open

Events
Singles	men	women		boys	girls
Doubles	men	women	mixed	boys	girls
WC Singles	men	women	quad
WC Doubles	men	women	quad
Legends	−45	45+	women

Qualification
Singles	men	women
- French Open

This article displays the qualifying draw for the Women's Singles at the 2000 French Open.

== Seeds ==
1. (Italy) Giulia Casoni (qualified)
2. (Romania) Cătălina Cristea (qualified)
3. (Spain) Marta Marrero (qualified)
4. (United States) Jennifer Hopkins (qualified)
5. (Belarus) Nadejda Ostrovskaya (second round)
6. (China) Li Fang (first round)
7. (Poland) Magdalena Grzybowska (qualified)
8. (United States) Meilen Tu (first round)
9. (Japan) Shinobu Asagoe (first round)
10. (Russia) Lina Krasnoroutskaya (qualifying competition, lucky loser)
11. (Chinese Taipei) Janet Lee (second round)
12. (Belarus) Tatiana Poutchek (first round)
13. (United States) Brie Rippner (second round)
14. (Argentina) Mariana Díaz Oliva (qualifying competition)
15. (Spain) Nuria Llagostera Vives (first round)
16. (Australia) Annabel Ellwood (second round)
17. (Japan) Yuka Yoshida (first round)
18. (Slovakia) Ľudmila Cervanová (first round)
19. (United States) Mashona Washington (second round)
20. (United Kingdom) Louise Latimer (qualifying competition)
21. (Hungary) Anna Földényi (qualified)
22. (Italy) Francesca Schiavone (qualifying competition)
23. (Germany) Angelika Bachmann (qualified)
24. (Denmark) Eva Dyrberg (second round)

== Qualifiers ==
1. (Italy) Giulia Casoni
2. (Romania) Cătălina Cristea
3. (Spain) Marta Marrero
4. (United States) Jennifer Hopkins
5. (Paraguay) Rossana de los Ríos
6. (Russia) Elena Bovina
7. (Poland) Magdalena Grzybowska
8. (Germany) Julia Abe
9. (Ukraine) Tatiana Kovalchuk
10. (Austria) Marion Maruska
11. (Germany) Angelika Bachmann
12. (Hungary) Anna Földényi

== Lucky loser ==
1. (Russia) Lina Krasnoroutskaya

== Qualifying draw ==
Key

- Q = Qualifier
- WC = Wild card
- LL = Lucky loser
- Alt = Alternate
- ITF = ITF entry
- PR = Protected ranking
- SR = Special ranking
- SE = Special exempt
- JE = Junior exempt
- JR = Junior Accelerator Programme entrant
- CO = College Accelerator Programme entrant
- NG = Next Gen Accelerator Program entrant
- w/o = Walkover
- r = Retired
- d = Defaulted

=== First qualifier ===
First round
1	(Italy) Giulia Casoni	6	6
WC	(France) Sophie Lefèvre	3	0
(Colombia) Catalina Castaño	6	6
(Uzbekistan) Iroda Tulyaganova	2	3
(United States) Linda Wild	6	1	6
(Canada) Renata Kolbovic	4	6	4
(South Africa) Surina De Beer	1	7^{7}	6
19	(United States) Mashona Washington	6	6^{5}	8

Second round
1	(Italy) Giulia Casoni	6^{6}	6	6
(Colombia) Catalina Castaño	7^{8}	1	3
(United States) Linda Wild	7^{8}	6
19	(United States) Mashona Washington	6^{6}	4

Qualifying competition
1	(Italy) Giulia Casoni	6	6
(United States) Linda Wild	3	4

=== Second qualifier ===
First round
2	(Romania) Cătălina Cristea	7^{7}	6
WC	(France) Anne-Laure Heitz	6^{2}	3
(Italy) Maria Paola Zavagli	1	1
(Czech Republic) Dája Bedáňová	6	6
(United States) Jolene Watanabe	6	6
(Russia) Evgenia Kulikovskaya	3	3
WC	(France) Chloé Carlotti	4	3
14	(Argentina) Mariana Díaz Oliva	6	6

Second round
2	(Romania) Cătălina Cristea	7	7
(Czech Republic) Dája Bedáňová	5	5
(United States) Jolene Watanabe	2	2
14	(Argentina) Mariana Díaz Oliva	6	6

Qualifying competition
2	(Romania) Cătălina Cristea	3	6	7
14	(Argentina) Mariana Díaz Oliva	6	2	5

=== Third qualifier ===
First round
3	(Spain) Marta Marrero	6	6
(Germany) Veronika Martinek	1	0
(Japan) Nana Miyagi	3	2
WC	(France) Sophie Georges	6	6
(Israel) Hila Rosen	7^{7}	6^{0}	2
WC	(France) Karolina Jagieniak	6^{3}	7^{7}	6
(Netherlands) Yvette Basting	6	3	4
16	(Australia) Annabel Ellwood	3	6	6

Second round
3	(Spain) Marta Marrero	7	6
WC	(France) Sophie Georges	5	1
WC	(France) Karolina Jagieniak	6	1	6
16	(Australia) Annabel Ellwood	3	6	2

Qualifying competition
3	(Spain) Marta Marrero	6	6
WC	(France) Karolina Jagieniak	0	1

=== Fourth qualifier ===
First round
4	(United States) Jennifer Hopkins	6	6
(Romania) Raluca Sandu	0	0
(United Kingdom) Julie Pullin	6	6
(Italy) Francesca Lubiani	2	4
(Australia) Rachel McQuillan	6	6
(Slovenia) Petra Rampre	3	2
(Czech Republic) Renata Kučerová	3	2
24	(Denmark) Eva Dyrberg	6	6

Second round
4	(United States) Jennifer Hopkins	6	5	6
(United Kingdom) Julie Pullin	1	7	2
(Australia) Rachel McQuillan	6	5	6
24	(Denmark) Eva Dyrberg	1	7	4

Qualifying competition
4	(United States) Jennifer Hopkins	1	7	6
(Australia) Rachel McQuillan	6	5	2

=== Fifth qualifier ===
First round
5	(Belarus) Nadejda Ostrovskaya	7^{7}	6
(Italy) Adriana Serra Zanetti	6^{3}	4
(Paraguay) Rossana de los Ríos	6	6
(Israel) Tzipora Obziler	1	2
(Slovakia) Janette Husárová	1	6	6
(Italy) Laura Dell'Angelo	6	4	3
(Spain) Mariam Ramon Climent	2	6	6
18	(Slovakia) Ľudmila Cervanová	6	3	1

Second round
5	(Belarus) Nadejda Ostrovskaya	2	3
(Paraguay) Rossana de los Ríos	6	6
(Slovakia) Janette Husárová	6	6
(Spain) Mariam Ramon Climent	3	1

Qualifying competition
(Paraguay) Rossana de los Ríos	6	6
(Slovakia) Janette Husárová	2	1

=== Sixth qualifier ===
First round
6	(China) Li Fang	7	4	3
(Belgium) Daphne van de Zande	5	6	6
(Slovakia) Martina Suchá	7^{7}	6
(Ukraine) Elena Tatarkova	6^{5}	3
(Russia) Elena Bovina	6	6
(United States) Lindsay Lee-Waters	1	2
(Czech Republic) Libuše Prušová	5	0
13	(United States) Brie Rippner	7	6

Second round
(Belgium) Daphne van de Zande	4	2
(Slovakia) Martina Suchá	6	6
(Russia) Elena Bovina	6	6
13	(United States) Brie Rippner	3	2

Qualifying competition
(Slovakia) Martina Suchá	2	2
(Russia) Elena Bovina	6	6

=== Seventh qualifier ===
First round
7	(Poland) Magdalena Grzybowska	6	6
(Australia) Evie Dominikovic	1	3
(Venezuela) Milagros Sequera	6	6
(Australia) Bryanne Stewart	4	3
(Japan) Haruka Inoue	1	1
(Czech Republic) Lenka Nemecková	6	6
(Kazakhstan) Irina Selyutina	3	1
22	(Italy) Francesca Schiavone	6	6

Second round
7	(Poland) Magdalena Grzybowska	2	7^{7}	7
(Venezuela) Milagros Sequera	6	6^{2}	5
(Czech Republic) Lenka Nemecková	3	4
22	(Italy) Francesca Schiavone	6	6

Qualifying competition
7	(Poland) Magdalena Grzybowska	1	7	9
22	(Italy) Francesca Schiavone	6	5	7

=== Eighth qualifier ===
First round
8	(United States) Meilen Tu	3	2
(Germany) Julia Abe	6	6
WC	(France) Camille Pin	3	3
WC	(France) Stéphanie Rizzi	6	6
(Bulgaria) Desislava Topalova	7	3	6
(India) Nirupama Vaidyanathan	5	6	4
(Germany) Adriana Barna	6	4	6
20	(United Kingdom) Louise Latimer	3	6	8

Second round
(Germany) Julia Abe	6	7^{7}
WC	(France) Stéphanie Rizzi	4	6^{4}
(Bulgaria) Desislava Topalova	6^{5}	6^{4}
20	(United Kingdom) Louise Latimer	7^{7}	7^{7}

Qualifying competition
(Germany) Julia Abe	6	6
20	(United Kingdom) Louise Latimer	1	2

=== Ninth qualifier ===
First round
9	(Japan) Shinobu Asagoe	5	4
(Spain) Laura Pena	7	6
(Austria) Karin Kschwendt	1	0
(Germany) Gréta Arn	6	6
(Germany) Anca Barna	3	3
(Spain) Conchita Martínez Granados	6	6
(Ukraine) Tatiana Kovalchuk	6	6
17	(Japan) Yuka Yoshida	3	3

Second round
(Spain) Laura Pena	2	5
(Germany) Gréta Arn	6	7
(Spain) Conchita Martínez Granados	5	3
(Ukraine) Tatiana Kovalchuk	7	6

Qualifying competition
(Germany) Gréta Arn	4	4
(Ukraine) Tatiana Kovalchuk	6	6

=== Tenth qualifier ===
First round
10	(Russia) Lina Krasnoroutskaya	6	6
(Austria) Evelyn Fauth	0	3
(Spain) Eva Bes-Ostariz	7	6
(Italy) Gloria Pizzichini	5	1
(Italy) Alice Canepa	6	4	1
(Spain) Rosa María Andrés Rodríguez	3	6	6
(Austria) Marion Maruska	3	7^{7}	6
15	(Spain) Nuria Llagostera Vives	6	6^{2}	3

Second round
10	(Russia) Lina Krasnoroutskaya	7	6
(Spain) Eva Bes-Ostariz	5	3
(Spain) Rosa María Andrés Rodríguez	2	5
(Austria) Marion Maruska	6	7

Qualifying competition
10	(Russia) Lina Krasnoroutskaya	5	6	1
(Austria) Marion Maruska	7	1	6

=== Eleventh qualifier ===
First round
11	(Chinese Taipei) Janet Lee	6	6
(Slovenia) Tina Križan	4	2
WC	(France) Carine Bornu	4	3
(Spain) Ainhoa Goñi	6	6
(United Kingdom) Lucie Ahl	6	4	1
(Poland) Anna Żarska	3	6	6
(Australia) Lisa McShea	3	5
23	(Germany) Angelika Bachmann	6	7

Second round
11	(Chinese Taipei) Janet Lee	4	3
(Spain) Ainhoa Goñi	6	6
(Poland) Anna Żarska	3	5
23	(Germany) Angelika Bachmann	6	7

Qualifying competition
(Spain) Ainhoa Goñi	2	6	2
23	(Germany) Angelika Bachmann	6	3	6

=== Twelfth qualifier ===
First round
12	(Belarus) Tatiana Poutchek	1	5
(Bulgaria) Elena Pampoulova	6	7
(France) Lea Ghirardi	6	6
(Germany) Miriam Schnitzer	2	0
(United States) Tracy Almeda-Singian	3	2
(United States) Samantha Reeves	6	6
(United Kingdom) Karen Cross	2	3
21	(Hungary) Anna Földényi	6	6

Second round
(Bulgaria) Elena Pampoulova	6	6^{1}	7
(France) Lea Ghirardi	1	7^{7}	5
(United States) Samantha Reeves	6^{6}	3
21	(Hungary) Anna Földényi	7^{8}	6

Qualifying competition
(Bulgaria) Elena Pampoulova	2	3
21	(Hungary) Anna Földényi	6	6
