= 1998 Australian Open – Women's singles qualifying =

Women's singles qualifying
- 1998 Australian Open

Events
Singles	men	women		boys	girls
Doubles	men	women	mixed	boys	girls
WC Singles	men	women	quad
WC Doubles	men	women	quad
Legends	men	women	mixed

Qualification
Singles	men	women
- Australian Open

This article displays the qualifying draw for the Women's Singles at the 1998 Australian Open.

== Seeds ==
1. (United States) Annie Miller (qualified)
2. (Bulgaria) Pavlina Stoyanova (second round)
3. (Netherlands) Seda Noorlander (first round)
4. (France) Lea Ghirardi (qualifying competition)
5. (Germany) Marketa Kochta (first round)
6. (United Kingdom) Samantha Smith (qualifying competition)
7. (Czech Republic) Petra Langrová (second round)
8. (Ukraine) Elena Tatarkova (qualified)
9. (Luxembourg) Anne Kremer (second round)
10. (Germany) Marlene Weingärtner (second round)
11. (United States) Lindsay Lee (second round)
12. (France) Noëlle van Lottum (first round)
13. (United States) Karin Miller (qualifying competition)
14. (South Africa) Mariaan de Swardt (qualifying competition)
15. (Czech Republic) Eva Martincová (first round)
16. (Canada) Jana Nejedly (qualified)

== Qualifiers ==
1. (United States) Annie Miller
2. (United States) Samantha Reeves
3. (Czech Republic) Radka Bobková
4. (Ukraine) Elena Tatarkova
5. (Bulgaria) Svetlana Krivencheva
6. (United States) Meghann Shaughnessy
7. (United States) Ginger Helgeson-Nielsen
8. (Canada) Jana Nejedly

== Qualifying draw ==
Key

- Q = Qualifier
- WC = Wild card
- LL = Lucky loser
- Alt = Alternate
- ITF = ITF entry
- PR = Protected ranking
- SR = Special ranking
- SE = Special exempt
- JE = Junior exempt
- JR = Junior Accelerator Programme entrant
- CO = College Accelerator Programme entrant
- NG = Next Gen Accelerator Program entrant
- w/o = Walkover
- r = Retired
- d = Defaulted

=== First qualifier ===
First round
1	(United States) Annie Miller	6	6
(Romania) Raluca Sandu	1	4
(Israel) Anna Smashnova	7^{7}	6
(Georgia (country)) Nino Louarsabishvili	6^{5}	3
(Belgium) Daphne van de Zande	6	6
(Czech Republic) Ludmila Varmužová	3	3
(Spain) Laura Pena	1	6	5
10	(Germany) Marlene Weingärtner	6	2	7

Second round
1	(United States) Annie Miller	6	6
(Israel) Anna Smashnova	4	3
(Belgium) Daphne van de Zande	2	6	6
10	(Germany) Marlene Weingärtner	6	4	3

Qualifying competition
1	(United States) Annie Miller	4	6	6
(Belgium) Daphne van de Zande	6	3	1

=== Second qualifier ===
First round
11	(United States) Lindsay Lee	6^{5}	6	6
WC	(Australia) Melissa Beadman	7^{7}	1	2
(Belgium) Nancy Feber	3	2
(United States) Samantha Reeves	6	6
(Belgium) Laurence Courtois	4	6	6
(South Africa) Nannie de Villiers	6	2	3
(Australia) Gail Biggs	4	2
6	(United Kingdom) Samantha Smith	6	6

Second round
11	(United States) Lindsay Lee	6	3	0
(United States) Samantha Reeves	4	6	6
(Belgium) Laurence Courtois	6	2	2
6	(United Kingdom) Samantha Smith	3	6	6

Qualifying competition
(United States) Samantha Reeves	7^{7}	6
6	(United Kingdom) Samantha Smith	6^{2}	4

=== Third qualifier ===
First round
3	(Netherlands) Seda Noorlander	4	4
(Czech Republic) Radka Bobková	6	6
(Croatia) Silvija Talaja	6^{5}	3
(Spain) Ana Alcázar	7^{7}	6
(Japan) Kyōko Nagatsuka	1	6	3
(Sweden) Kristina Triska	6	4	6
(Austria) Barbara Schwartz	6	6
15	(Czech Republic) Eva Martincová	3	2

Second round
(Czech Republic) Radka Bobková	6	1	6
(Spain) Ana Alcázar	0	6	1
(Sweden) Kristina Triska	0	1
(Austria) Barbara Schwartz	6	6

Qualifying competition
(Czech Republic) Radka Bobková	6	7^{7}
(Austria) Barbara Schwartz	4	6^{2}

=== Fourth qualifier ===
First round
14	(South Africa) Mariaan de Swardt	6	6
(Germany) Miriam Schnitzer	3	4
(Italy) Tathiana Garbin	2	4
(United Kingdom) Julie Pullin	6	6
(France) Caroline Dhenin	5	2
(Germany) Syna Schmidle	7	6
(Poland) Aleksandra Olsza	4	2
8	(Ukraine) Elena Tatarkova	6	6

Second round
14	(South Africa) Mariaan de Swardt	6	6
(United Kingdom) Julie Pullin	2	1
(Germany) Syna Schmidle	4	4
8	(Ukraine) Elena Tatarkova	6	6

Qualifying competition
14	(South Africa) Mariaan de Swardt	1	6	5
8	(Ukraine) Elena Tatarkova	6	4	7

=== Fifth qualifier ===
First round
7	(Czech Republic) Petra Langrová	7	6
(South Africa) Liezel Horn	5	0
(Belgium) Stephanie Devillé	3	5
(Bulgaria) Svetlana Krivencheva	6	7
(Austria) Karin Kschwendt	6	3	6
(South Korea) Kim Eun-ha	4	6	4
(Hungary) Virág Csurgó	1	3
13	(United States) Karin Miller	6	6

Second round
7	(Czech Republic) Petra Langrová	7^{7}	4	5
(Bulgaria) Svetlana Krivencheva	6^{4}	6	7
(Austria) Karin Kschwendt	6^{2}	0
13	(United States) Karin Miller	7^{7}	6

Qualifying competition
(Bulgaria) Svetlana Krivencheva	6	6
13	(United States) Karin Miller	3	1

=== Sixth qualifier ===
First round
12	(France) Noëlle van Lottum	4	6	4
(Slovenia) Tina Križan	6	0	6
WC	(Australia) Rochelle Rosenfield	5	1
(United States) Meghann Shaughnessy	7	6
WC	(Australia) Cindy Watson	6	4	6
(Japan) Shinobu Asagoe	2	6	4
WC	(Australia) Bryanne Stewart	6	4	2
4	(France) Lea Ghirardi	4	6	6

Second round
(Slovenia) Tina Križan	3	2
(United States) Meghann Shaughnessy	6	6
WC	(Australia) Cindy Watson	1	6	2
4	(France) Lea Ghirardi	6	2	6

Qualifying competition
(United States) Meghann Shaughnessy	6	6
4	(France) Lea Ghirardi	4	3

=== Seventh qualifier ===
First round
5	(Germany) Marketa Kochta	3	0
WC	(Australia) Alicia Molik	6	6
(United States) Brie Rippner	3	6^{3}
(United States) Ginger Helgeson-Nielsen	6	7^{7}
WC	(Australia) Amanda Grahame	6	7
WC	(Australia) Lisa McShea	3	5
WC	(Australia) Jenny-Ann Fetch	3	4
9	(Luxembourg) Anne Kremer	6	6

Second round
WC	(Australia) Alicia Molik	3	0
(United States) Ginger Helgeson-Nielsen	6	6
WC	(Australia) Amanda Grahame	7	1	7
9	(Luxembourg) Anne Kremer	5	6	5

Qualifying competition
(United States) Ginger Helgeson-Nielsen	6	6
WC	(Australia) Amanda Grahame	1	3

=== Eighth qualifier ===
First round
16	(Canada) Jana Nejedly	6	7^{7}
(Spain) Eva Bes-Ostariz	3	6^{3}
(Germany) Veronika Martinek	1	1
(United States) Erika deLone	6	6
(Zimbabwe) Cara Black	6	6^{4}	7
(Canada) Martina Nejedly	3	7^{7}	5
(Spain) Conchita Martínez Granados	6^{5}	3
2	(Bulgaria) Pavlina Stoyanova	7^{7}	6

Second round
16	(Canada) Jana Nejedly	4	6	6
(United States) Erika deLone	6	3	0
(Zimbabwe) Cara Black	0	6	6
2	(Bulgaria) Pavlina Stoyanova	6	4	3

Qualifying competition
16	(Canada) Jana Nejedly	7^{9}	6
(Zimbabwe) Cara Black	6^{7}	2
