= Jim Rosborough =

American basketball coach (born 1944)

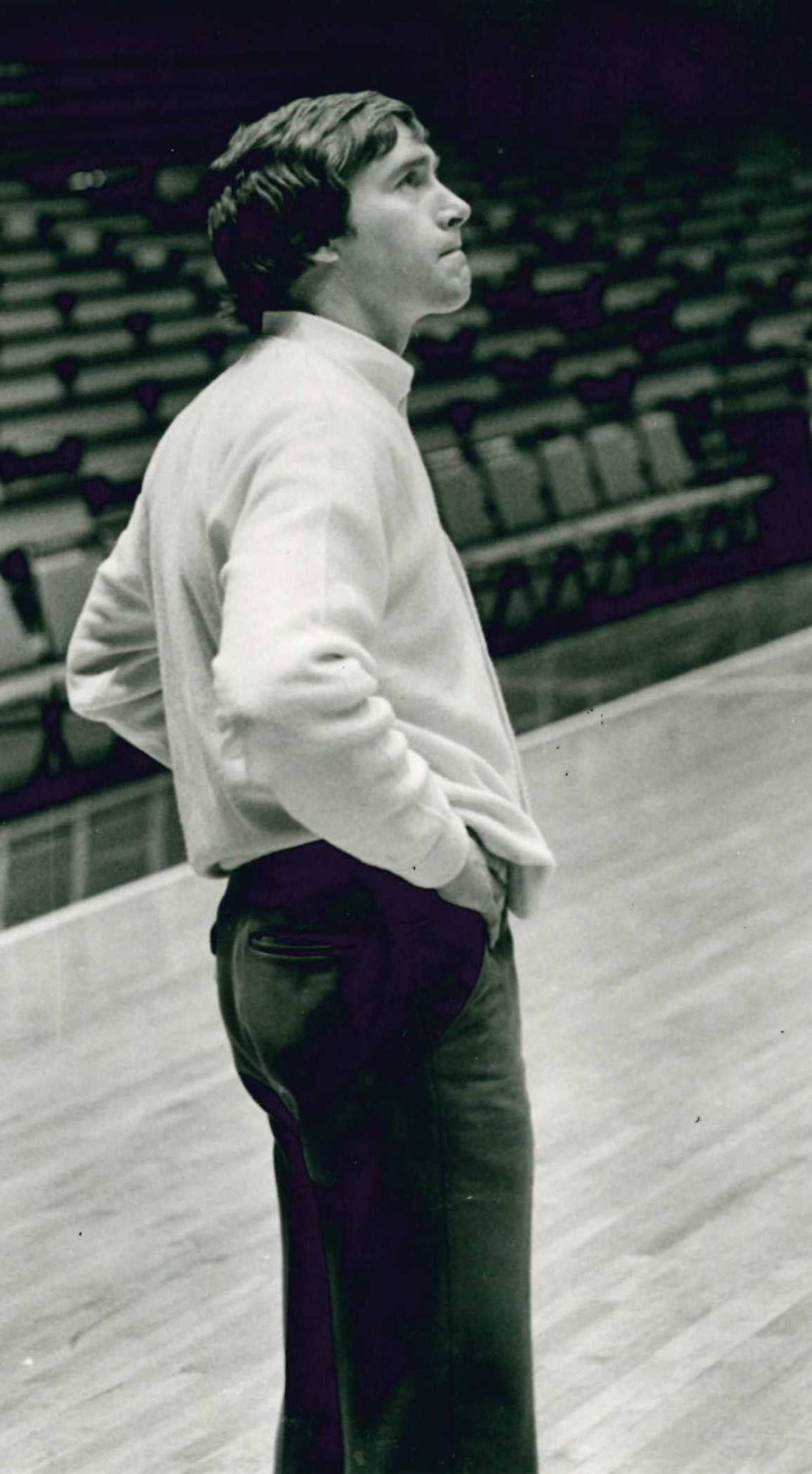
- Rosborough on the court at Iowa, 1980

Biographical details
- Born: December 2, 1944 (age 81); Moline, Illinois, U.S.

Playing career

Basketball
- 1962–1966: Iowa
- Position: Small forward

Coaching career (HC unless noted)

Basketball
- 1970–1974: Corkery School
- 1974–1983: Iowa (assistant)
- 1985–1986: Tulsa (assistant)
- 1986–1989: Northern Illinois
- 1989–2007: Arizona (associate HC)
- 2009–2010: Pima CC (men's, assistant)
- 2014–present: Pima CC (women's, assistant)

Women's tennis
- 2010–14: Arizona (assistant)

Head coaching record
- Overall: 31–58 (college)

James M. Rosborough (born December 2, 1944) is an American basketball coach. Rosborough began his career coaching basketball in 1970 in Chicago at Corkery Junior High, before being hired as an assistant coach in 1974 by Lute Olson at Iowa. Rosborough and Olson coached together for nine seasons at Iowa, reaching five consecutive NCAA tournament berths and reaching the 1980 NCAA Final Four. Rosborough coached briefly at Tulsa (1985-1986) and as head coach at NIU (1986-1989) before rejoining Olson in 1989 as an assistant, and eventual associate head coach, at Arizona through 18 seasons. The team was a prominent collegiate basketball program in the United States throughout the 90's and 00's, reaching 18 consecutive NCAA tournament berths, eight Pac-10 championships, three NCAA Final Fours, and winning the 1997 NCAA Championship. Rosborough coached over 50 All-American, all-conference and future NBA players during his time at Arizona. Rosborough was inducted to the Illinois Basketball Coaches Hall of Fame in 2001.

Since leaving the University of Arizona following the 2006–07 season, Rosborough has stayed active in coaching. He served as an assistant coach for the University of Arizona women's tennis program for four seasons with Vicky Maes, before taking his current role as an assistant coach with Todd Holthaus for the Pima College women's basketball program in 2015.

Rosborough is in his 47th season of coaching across all levels, with a career record of 1001 wins and 414 losses, a winning percentage over 70%. Rosborough achieved his 1000th career victory as a coach on April 2, 2021.

== Early life ==
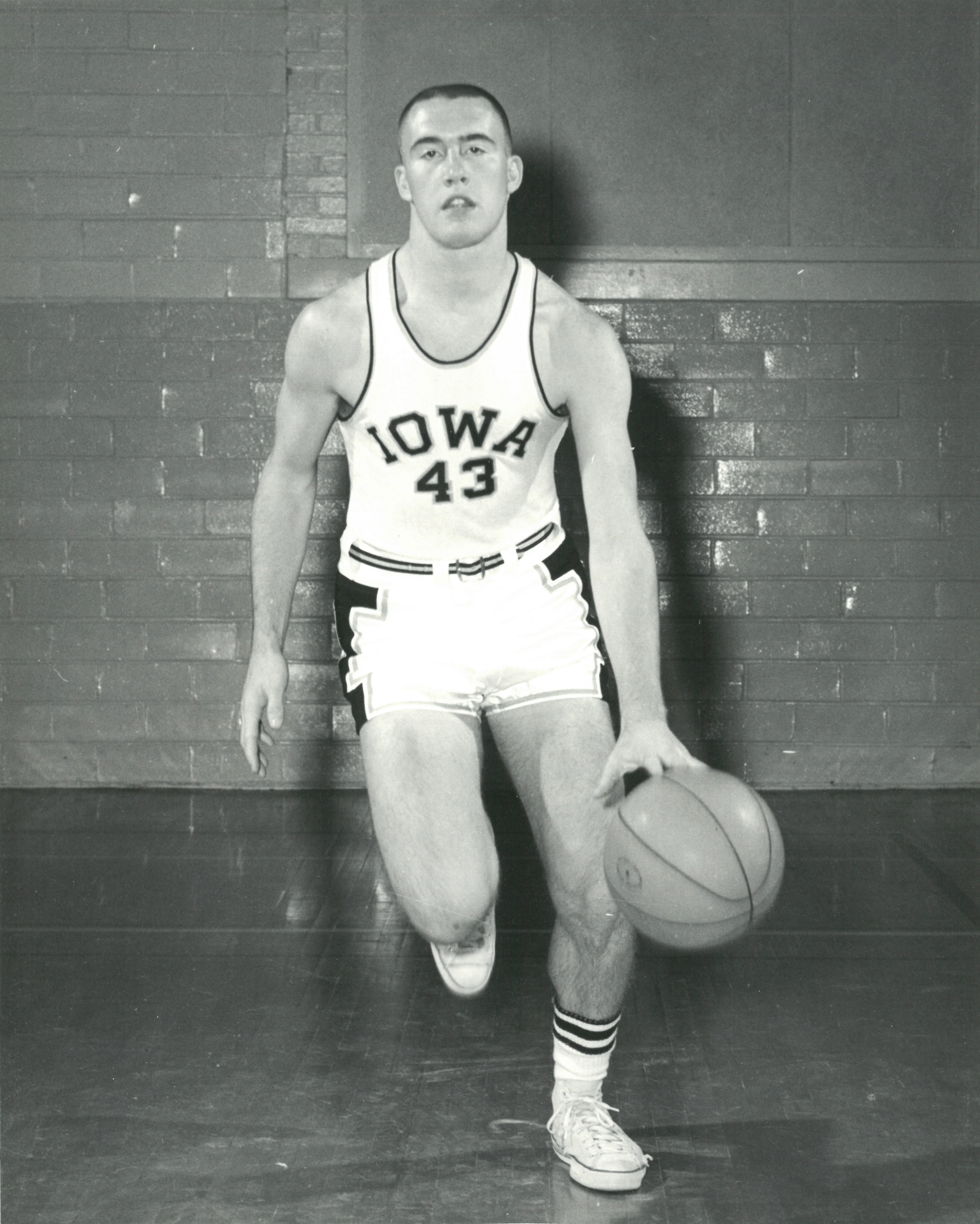
Rosborough at Iowa, 1964

Jim Rosborough was born in Moline, Illinois, to Jim and Pinky Rosborough on December 2, 1944, and is of Scottish American descent. His family had a strong connection to local basketball. Rosborough's grandfather, Caldwell Rosborough, was the president of the Moline School Board when it approved funding to build Wharton Field House to host Moline High School basketball games. Rosborough's father, also named Jim Rosborough and who also played for Moline High School, scored the first basket during the first game in Wharton Field House on December 21, 1928.

Rosborough was a standout player at Moline High School from 1960 to 1962. As a senior in the 1961-62 season, Rosborough averaged 13.0 points and 9.0 rebounds per game as a forward, leading his team to a 21–3 record, a No.1 ranking in the state, and a berth in the Illinois state tournament. Rosborough earned first team all-Mississippi Valley Conference accolades, as well as all-Metro Moline and All-Quad Cities honors, and was a fourth team all-state selection.

Upon graduating in 1962, Rosborough attended the University of Iowa to play on the basketball team where he was coached by Sharm Scheuerman for the first two seasons, and Ralph Miller for the final two seasons. Rosborough was a member of Sigma Alpha Epsilon. He graduated with a political science degree in 1966 and received a teaching degree in 1970 from Loyola University Chicago.

== Coaching career ==
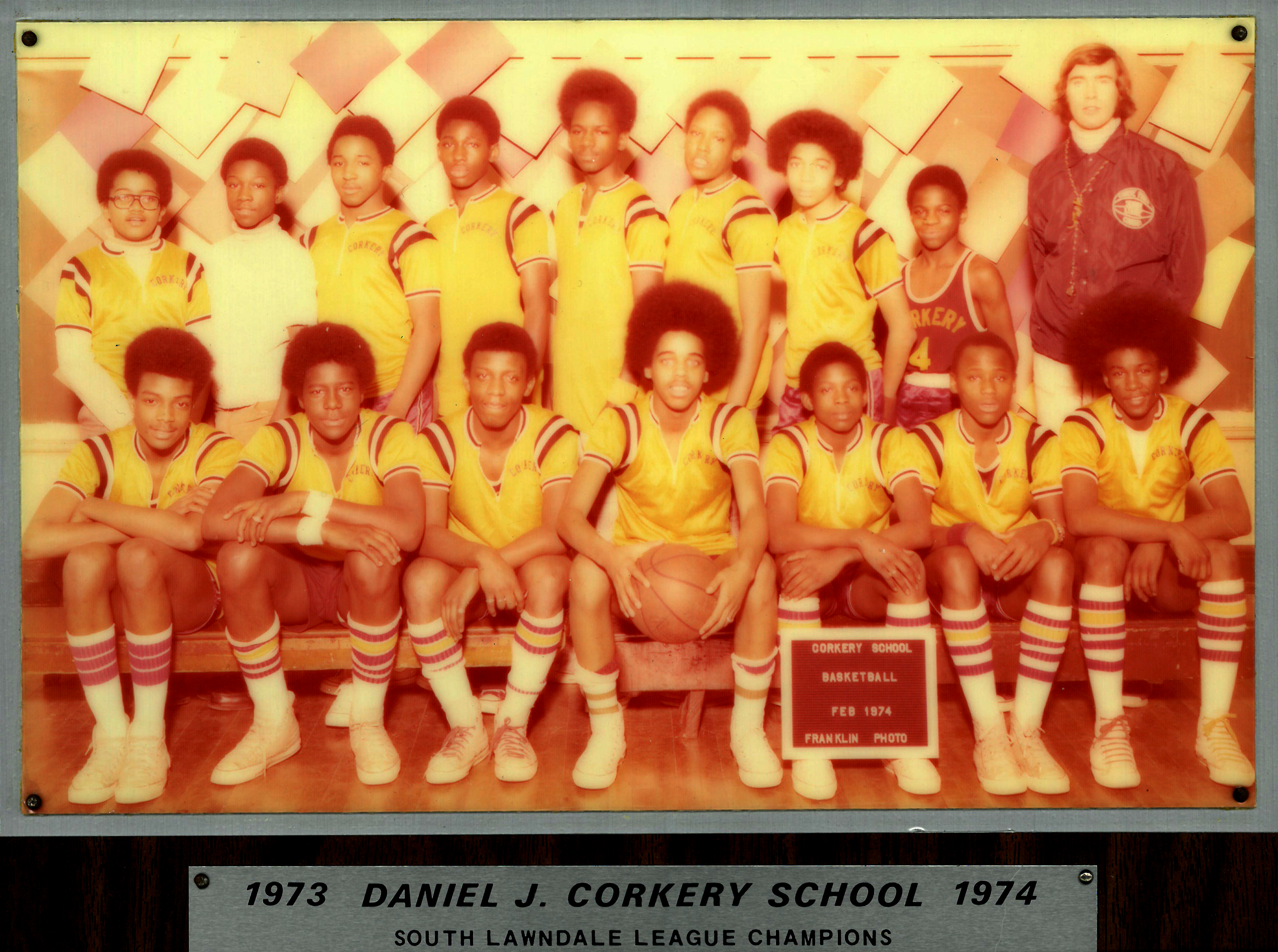
Rosborough with his team at Corkery, 1974

=== Beginnings in Chicago (1970–1974) ===
Following college, Rosborough completed a year of law school before beginning his career as a teacher at the Daniel J. Corkery School on Chicago's west side. In 1970, he volunteered to organize and coach the eighth grade basketball team and across four seasons, would lead the team to 127 wins and 22 losses. Recounting those days coaching and teaching in Chicago in a 2019 interview, Rosborough said, “I loved that. I taught classes during the day. We had a really good team. I’m thinking in four years there we won a hundred-some games traveling all over the Chicago area.” It was during this time that Rosborough became familiar with the Chicago basketball high school scene which would lead to his first collegiate coaching position at Iowa.

=== Iowa (1974–1983) ===
In the spring on 1974, Iowa hired Lute Olson as head coach. Soon after the hire, Rosborough, a former Iowa Hawkeye but still a teacher and eighth grade coach in Chicago at the time, called Olson to tell him about a prospect. A few weeks later, Olson hired Rosborough to be Iowa's graduate assistant coach. As Olson explained in his 2006 book, "What Jim lacked in experience, which was everything, he made up in personality. His willingness to work, his passion for the game, and his knowledge of the Chicago area made him a good fit at Iowa."

Recruiting was one of Rosborough's initial responsibilities, as he explained in a 2019 interview, “One of the good things we did at Iowa was to start an Advanced Invitational Camp. I’d comb through the newspapers and see this kid from a high school who’d done well, send him an invite to come to the camp, and we ended up – in the second year we did this – with 28 kids who went to Division I schools." Rosborough would rise to become Olson's top assistant and Iowa's chief recruiter in Chicago, landing key recruits Kenny Arnold and Ronnie Lester who would take Iowa to five straight NCAA tournaments and the Final Four in 1980.

Rosborough and Olson coached together for nine seasons, from 1974 to 1983, with an overall record of 167–91, before Olson left Iowa to accept the head coaching position at the University of Arizona. On Olson's departure, Rosborough was hired as an assistant to athletic director Bump Elliott and stayed at Iowa for two additional years.

=== Tulsa (1985–1986) ===
For the 1985–86 season, Rosborough was hired as an assistant coach at Tulsa by head coach J. D. Barnett. The team would have a successful season going 23–9, and winning the Missouri Valley Conference championship over Bradley. Barnett would go on to praise Rosborough's strategy in the victory saying, "We used different defenses. We put in a match-up Jim Rosborough used at Iowa. He put it in and it worked. We were able to take away their great athletic ability with our defense." The team would go on to play in the 1986 NCAA tournament and lose to Navy in the first round.

=== Northern Illinois (1986–1989) ===
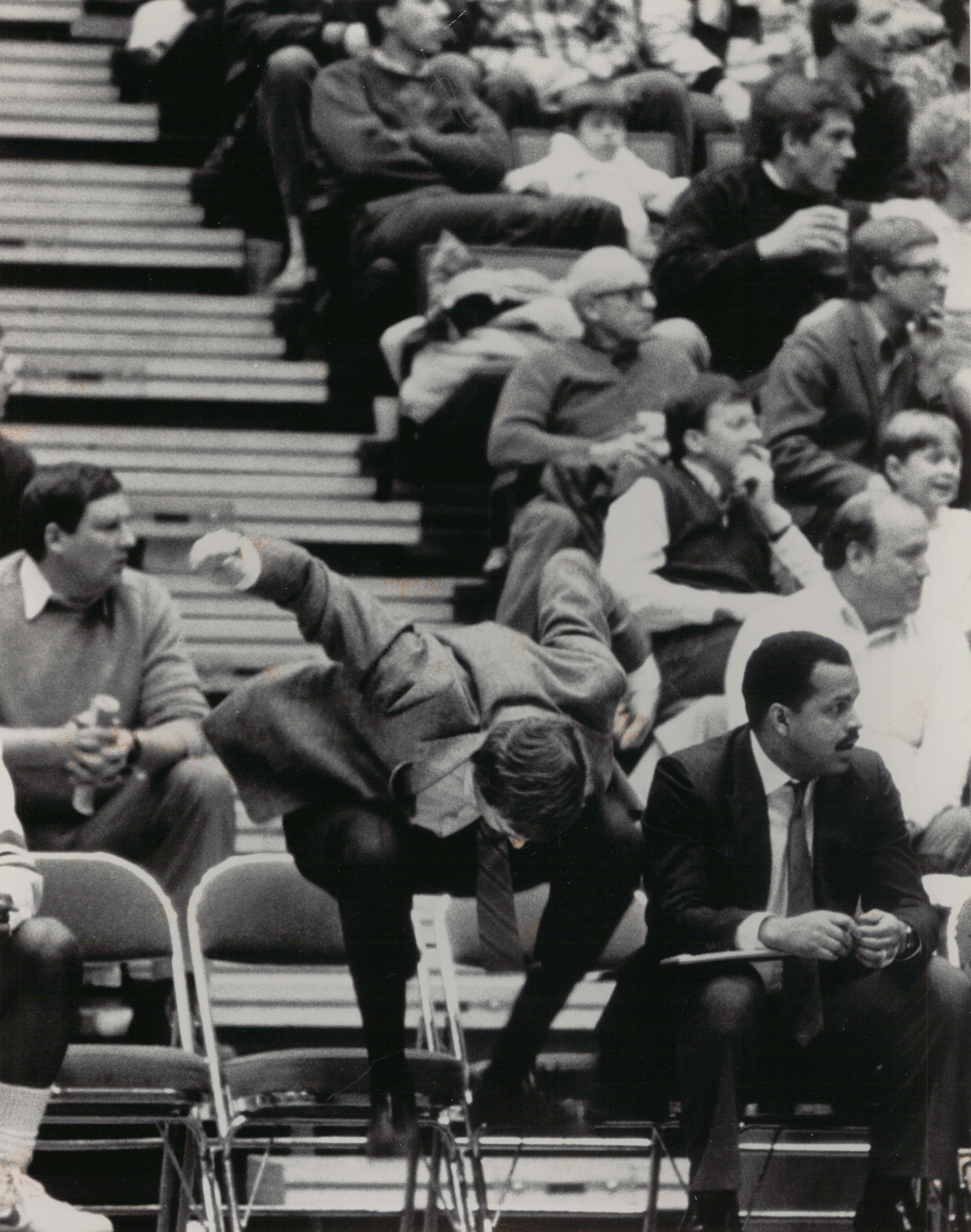
Rosborough coaching at NIU, 1988

Following the success in Tulsa, Rosborough was hired as the head men's basketball coach at Northern Illinois University in April 1986, with a stated goal to build a team that could make the NCAA tournament. In his three seasons as head coach at NIU, he answered to three different Athletic Directors, an instability that led to Rosborough being fired from the program in 1989. Rosborough said in a 2019 interview, “I knew right away when they hired the third AD that it wasn’t a good fit, so that was kind of a struggle year. To be honest with you, when I was let go, I didn’t mind it. I mean I minded it, but I didn’t mind it at all.”

Rosborough's freshman recruiting class at NIU would go on reach the NCAA tournament in the 1990-1991 season and win 25 games, the most in school history, solidifying the rebuilding of the program that Rosborough had started.

=== Arizona (1989–2007) ===
Following his departure from NIU, Lute Olson hired Rosborough as an assistant coach at Arizona in April 1989, saying, “The thing with Roz is that he is a premier sideline assistant, as good as any in the business.” The Rosborough and Olson led Arizona Wildcats were a dominant and consistent collegiate basketball team through the 90's and 00's, reaching 18 consecutive NCAA tournaments, eight Pac-10 championships, three NCAA Final Fours, and the 1997 NCAA Championship. Following the 1997 National Championship, Olson promoted Rosborough to Associate Head Coach, the position he would retain until leaving the team in 2007. Rosborough assumed the role of head coach briefly in 2001 following the death of Olson's wife, Bobbi Olson. Rosborough led the team to a 3–1 record in conference play.

==== 1997 NCAA Championship ====
The Arizona Wildcats were an unlikely 1997 National Champion. They entered the 1997 NCAA tournament with a 19–9 record after finishing in fifth place in the Pac-10. The team did not finish the regular season strongly and went 4–4 in their last eight games. In the first game of the NCAA Tournament, Arizona was in danger of getting upset by South Alabama, who was leading by two points at the half. The Wildcats relied on a perimeter strategy from guards Miles Simon, Mike Bibby, Michael Dickerson, and Jason Terry to carry the team. One of the team's unique accomplishments in their improbable run to the 1997 championship was that they were the only team in NCAA Tournament history to beat three No.1 seeds: Hall of Fame coach Roy Williams' nearly undefeated Kansas Jayhawks in the Sweet Sixteen, Hall of Fame coach Dean Smith's North Carolina Tar Heels in the Final Four, and Hall of Fame coach Rick Pitino's Kentucky Wildcats in the National Championship. The day after the victory in Indianapolis, the team was given a parade through the streets of Tucson.

==== Rosborough and Olson ====
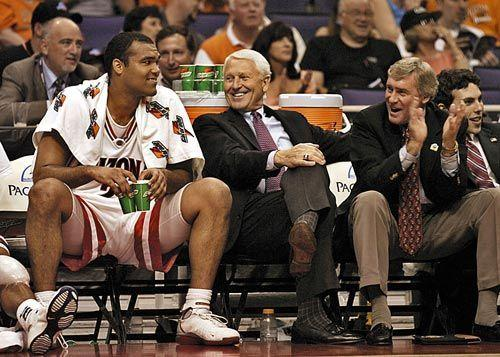
Rosborough and Olson in 2005

When Lute Olson was hired at Iowa in the spring of 1974, Jim Rosborough phoned and told him about a Chicago prospect. A few weeks later, Olson hired Rosborough to be Iowa’s graduate assistant coach. Olson would recount the hire in his 2006 book; "What Jim lacked in experience, which was everything, he made up in personality. His willingness to work, his passion for the game, and his knowledge of the Chicago area made him a good fit at Iowa." This was the start of a successful coaching relationship and friendship across the next 33 years. Rosborough served under Olson for nine seasons at Iowa, and for 18 seasons at Arizona as an assistant coach, and following the 1997 national championship, as associate head coach.

As Arizona's associate head coach, Rosborough's expertise within the Olson basketball system was a driving force that allowed the Arizona program to remain at the highest levels in the country, both on and off the court. The 2006-2007 season would be the final full season at Arizona for both Rosborough and Olson. Following the season, Rosborough rejected an offer to move to a non-coaching position within the athletic department, ending the long partnership with Olson. Due to health concerns, Olson did not coach the following season, and retired in 2008.

=== Pima College (2009–2010) ===
For the 2009-2010 basketball season, Rosborough was hired as the associate head coach of the Pima College men's basketball team. The team would go on to have their best season in school history at the time, finishing 7th in the NJCAA tournament.

=== Arizona women's tennis (2010–2014) ===
Rosborough worked as an assistant coach for the Arizona Wildcats women's tennis team for four seasons with head coach Vicky Maes. Across four seasons, the team qualified for the NCAA tournament three times, and in 2014, had an undefeated 14-0 home record. As Maes explained in a 2011 interview, "We were having breakfast one day and the idea (of him coaching) just kind of came about. When Ros joined the staff, the team may have wondered ‘what's a basketball guy going to do for us?' He has really kind of had to earn their trust." Rosborough explained his early interest in tennis in the same 2011 interview, saying, "We had a guy in our neighborhood back in Moline who was probably the best tennis player in Moline, and he was in the neighborhood so my parents knew him. When I was 10, I got some lessons from him." Rosborough's background in tennis and unlikely friendship with Jeb Schoonover is detailed in a 2004 Tucson Weekly magazine story called "The Odder Couple."

=== Pima College and NBA scout (2015–present) ===
Rosborough returned to Pima in 2015 as an assistant to Todd Holthaus on the women's team, where he currently coaches. The team has had over 20 wins each season, and qualified for NJCAA tournament twice, finishing 3rd in 2016, and 5th in 2019. In 2015, Rosborough was also hired as an NBA Scout for the Atlanta Hawks.

== Personal life ==
Rosborough lives in Tucson with his wife, Kim, whom he met in Iowa and married in 1979. Kim has an interior design firm in Tucson. Rosborough and his wife are parents to two sons, Greg and Jon. Both sons grew up playing basketball.

Jon became the third generation Rosborough to play at Moline's Wharton Field House when his high school team from Arizona played in a tournament in Moline on November 27, 2002, 40 years after his father, and 74 years after his grandfather. Jon lives with his wife Katie in Washington, D.C., where he works in strategic marketing.

Greg attended the University of Arizona and while there worked alongside his father as the basketball team's video coordinator. Greg lives with his wife Rebecca in New York City, where he is a menswear designer and was a CFDA/Vogue Fashion Fund finalist in 2019.

Rosborough and his wife participate annually in the Humane Society of Southern Arizona's "Puttin' on the Dog" fundraiser to support shelter animals. Rosborough has been an active board member involved in community governance at Epworth Heights, in Ludington, Michigan, his family summer home.

== Head coaching record ==
=== College ===
Record table
Season	Team	Overall	Conference	Standing	Postseason
Northern Illinois Huskies (NCAA Division I independent) (1986–1989)
1986–87	Northern Illinois	9–19			
1987–88	Northern Illinois	8–20			
1988–89	Northern Illinois	11–17			
Northern Illinois:		28–56 (.333)			
Arizona Wildcats (Pacific-10 Conference) (2000–2001)
2000–01	Arizona	3–2			
Arizona:		3–2 (.600)			
Total:		31–58 (.348)			
