= 1997 French Open – Women's singles =

Women's singles
- 1997 French Open

Final
- Champion: (Croatia) Iva Majoli
- Runner-up: (Switzerland) Martina Hingis
- Score: 6–4, 6–2

Details
- Draw: 128
- Seeds: 16

Events
Singles	men	women		boys	girls
Doubles	men	women	mixed	boys	girls
WC Singles	men	women	quad
WC Doubles	men	women	quad
Legends	−45	45+	women
- French Open

Iva Majoli defeated Martina Hingis in the final, 6–4, 6–2 to win the women's singles tennis title at the 1997 French Open. It was her first and only major title, becoming the first Croat to win a singles major. Hingis' defeat ended her unbeaten 35-match start to the season, and was her only loss at the majors in the 1997 season.

Steffi Graf was the two-time defending champion, but lost to Amanda Coetzer in the quarterfinals. It was the second consecutive major where Coetzer defeated Graf, after the 1997 Australian Open.

This tournament marked the major debut of future world No. 1 and seven-time major champion Venus Williams; she was defeated in the second round by Nathalie Tauziat.

== Seeds ==
1. (Switzerland) Martina Hingis (final)
2. (Germany) Steffi Graf (quarterfinals)
3. (United States) Monica Seles (semifinals)
4. (Czech Republic) Jana Novotná (third round)
5. (United States) Lindsay Davenport (fourth round)
6. (Spain) Arantxa Sánchez Vicario (quarterfinals)
7. (Spain) Conchita Martínez (fourth round)
8. (Germany) Anke Huber (first round)
9. (Croatia) Iva Majoli (champion)
10. (France) Mary Pierce (fourth round)
11. (South Africa) Amanda Coetzer (semifinals)
12. (United States) Mary Joe Fernández (quarterfinals)
13. (Romania) Irina Spîrlea (fourth round)
14. (Netherlands) Brenda Schultz-McCarthy (third round)
15. (Slovakia) Karina Habšudová (third round)
16. (Austria) Barbara Paulus (fourth round)

== Draw ==
Key

- Q = Qualifier
- WC = Wild card
- LL = Lucky loser
- Alt = Alternate
- ITF = ITF entry
- PR = Protected ranking
- SR = Special ranking
- SE = Special exempt
- JE = Junior exempt
- JR = Junior Accelerator Programme entrant
- CO = College Accelerator Programme entrant
- NG = Next Gen Accelerator Program entrant
- w/o = Walkover
- r = Retired
- d = Defaulted

=== Finals ===
Quarterfinals
1	(Switzerland) Martina Hingis	6	6
6	(Spain) Arantxa Sánchez Vicario	2	2
3	(United States) Monica Seles	3	6	7
12	(United States) Mary Joe Fernández	6	2	5
9	(Croatia) Iva Majoli	6	5	6
(Romania) Ruxandra Dragomir	3	7	2
11	(South Africa) Amanda Coetzer	6	6
2	(Germany) Steffi Graf	1	4

Semifinals
1	(Switzerland) Martina Hingis	6^{2}	7	6
3	(United States) Monica Seles	7^{7}	5	4
9	(Croatia) Iva Majoli	6	4	7
11	(South Africa) Amanda Coetzer	3	6	5

Final
1	(Switzerland) Martina Hingis	4	2
9	(Croatia) Iva Majoli	6	6

=== Top half ===
==== Section 1 ====
First round
1	(Switzerland) M Hingis	6	6
(Slovakia) H Nagyová	0	2
Q	(United States) S Cacic	6^{5}	5
(Italy) G Pizzichini	7^{7}	7
(Slovakia) R Zrubáková	3	2
(Russia) A Kournikova	6	6
(Japan) M Endo	6^{5}	6^{4}
(Italy) A-M Cecchini	7^{7}	7^{7}
(Italy) S Farina	6	1	6
(Austria) J Wiesner	2	6	0
(Poland) M Grzybowska	6	3	4
(Germany) P Begerow	3	6	6
(Chinese Taipei) S-t Wang	6	7
(Belgium) S Devillé	3	5
(United States) T Whitlinger-Jones	0	1
16	(Austria) B Paulus	6	6

Second round
1	(Switzerland) M Hingis	3	6	6
(Italy) G Pizzichini	6	4	1
(Russia) A Kournikova	6	6
(Italy) A-M Cecchini	2	2
(Italy) S Farina	6	6
(Germany) P Begerow	4	2
(Chinese Taipei) S-t Wang	2	2
16	(Austria) B Paulus	6	6

Third round
1	(Switzerland) M Hingis	6	6
(Russia) A Kournikova	1	3
(Italy) S Farina	4	1
16	(Austria) B Paulus	6	6

Fourth round
1	(Switzerland) M Hingis	6	0	6
16	(Austria) B Paulus	3	6	0

==== Section 2 ====
First round
14	(Netherlands) B Schultz-McCarthy	6	7
(Czech Republic) L Cenková	3	5
(Argentina) F Labat	7	6
(Netherlands) K Boogert	5	0
WC	(France) M Lamarre	6
(Austria) B Schett	1	r
(United States) M Tu	3	6	4
(Belarus) N Zvereva	6	3	6
(Germany) B Rittner	0	r
(Belgium) D Van Roost	3
(Switzerland) E Gagliardi	6	6
(United States) K Brandi	3	4
(Bulgaria) E Pampoulova	7	4	1
(Japan) A Sugiyama	5	6	6
WC	(France) K Jagieniak	0	2
6	(Spain) A Sánchez Vicario	6	6

Second round
14	(Netherlands) B Schultz-McCarthy	4	7^{7}	6
(Argentina) F Labat	6	6^{5}	4
WC	(France) M Lamarre	4	5
(Belarus) N Zvereva	6	7
(Belgium) D Van Roost	6	6
(Switzerland) E Gagliardi	2	0
(Japan) A Sugiyama	3	1
6	(Spain) A Sánchez Vicario	6	6

Third round
14	(Netherlands) B Schultz-McCarthy	6^{2}	4
(Belarus) N Zvereva	7^{7}	6
(Belgium) D Van Roost	0	3
6	(Spain) A Sánchez Vicario	6	6

Fourth round
(Belarus) N Zvereva	4	2
6	(Spain) A Sánchez Vicario	6	6

==== Section 3 ====
First round
3	(United States) M Seles	6	6
(Japan) M Saeki	0	3
(France) S Pitkowski	7^{7}	6
(Italy) F Lubiani	6^{2}	2
(Japan) N Sawamatsu	2	7^{7}	5
(United States) V Williams	6	6^{2}	7
(France) N Tauziat	6	6
(Canada) R Simpson	3	2
(France) S Testud	6	6
Q	(South Korea) S-h Park	0	4
(Germany) W Probst	3	4
(Romania) C Cristea	6	6
(Canada) P Hy-Boulais	6^{6}	6	11
(France) N Dechy	7^{8}	4	9
(Russia) T Panova	2	6	4
10	(France) M Pierce	6	4	6

Second round
3	(United States) M Seles	6	7
(France) S Pitkowski	3	5
(United States) V Williams	7	3	5
(France) N Tauziat	5	6	7
(France) S Testud	6	6
(Romania) C Cristea	0	4
(Canada) P Hy-Boulais	1	3
10	(France) M Pierce	6	6

Third round
3	(United States) M Seles	6	6
(France) N Tauziat	0	1
(France) S Testud	1	3
10	(France) M Pierce	6	6

Fourth round
3	(United States) M Seles	6	7
10	(France) M Pierce	4	5

==== Section 4 ====
First round
12	(United States) M J Fernandez	6	6
(United States) L McNeil	2	3
(Germany) A Glass	6	4	6
(Belgium) E Callens	3	6	2
(Netherlands) M Oremans	6	2	3
WC	(France) L Ghirardi-Rubbi	2	6	6
(Japan) N Miyagi	6^{3}	6	0
(Italy) F Perfetti	7^{7}	2	6
(Bulgaria) M Maleeva	6	5	3
(United States) L Raymond	4	7	6
(Belgium) L Courtois	6^{2}	4
(Thailand) T Tanasugarn	7^{7}	6
(Japan) Y Yoshida	6	6
(Australia) R McQuillan	2	4
(United States) K Po	6	4	6
8	(Germany) A Huber	3	6	3

Second round
12	(United States) M J Fernandez	6	6
(Germany) A Glass	1	0
WC	(France) L Ghirardi-Rubbi	4	1
(Italy) F Perfetti	6	6
(United States) L Raymond	6	6
(Thailand) T Tanasugarn	1	1
(Japan) Y Yoshida	3	0
(United States) K Po	6	6

Third round
12	(United States) M J Fernandez	6	7^{7}
(Italy) F Perfetti	3	6^{4}
(United States) L Raymond	6	2	6
(United States) K Po	4	6	1

Fourth round
12	(United States) M J Fernandez	6^{4}	6	6
(United States) L Raymond	7^{7}	2	2

=== Bottom half ===
==== Section 5 ====
First round
5	(United States) L Davenport	6	6
Q	(South Africa) J Kruger	2	3
(Russia) E Makarova	6	6
(France) A Dechaume-Balleret	4	2
(Austria) M Maruska	3	3
(Switzerland) P Schnyder	6	6
(Slovakia) K Studeníková	6	6
(Czech Republic) P Langrová	2	2
(France) A-G Sidot	2	5
(Latvia) L Neiland	6	7
(Czech Republic) A Gerši	3	0
(United States) A Grossman	6	6
(Czech Republic) L Richterová	5	0	r
(France) A Fusai	7	3
(Czech Republic) S Kleinová	5	4
9	(Croatia) I Majoli	7	6

Second round
5	(United States) L Davenport	6	6
(Russia) E Makarova	1	1
(Switzerland) P Schnyder	6	2
(Slovakia) K Studeníková	0	0	r
(Latvia) L Neiland	4	4
(United States) A Grossman	6	6
(France) A Fusai	2	3
9	(Croatia) I Majoli	6	6

Third round
5	(United States) L Davenport	4	6	9
(Switzerland) P Schnyder	6	3	7
(United States) A Grossman	1	6	1
9	(Croatia) I Majoli	6	4	6

Fourth round
5	(United States) L Davenport	7	4	2
9	(Croatia) I Majoli	5	6	6

==== Section 6 ====
First round
15	(Slovakia) K Habšudová	6	6
(Belarus) O Barabanschikova	3	3
(Czech Republic) L Němečková	4	3
(Russia) E Likhovtseva	6	6
(Sweden) Å Carlsson	4	6	1
(Indonesia) Y Basuki	6	4	6
(Romania) R Dragomir	6	6
Q	(Canada) S Jeyaseelan	3	2
(Japan) R Hiraki	2	1
(United States) N Arendt	6	6
Q	(Italy) L Golarsa	4	7	12
(France) N van Lottum	6	5	10
(Germany) J Kandarr	7^{7}	6
(Spain) G León García	6^{1}	3
(Spain) C Torrens Valero	3	2
4	(Czech Republic) J Novotná	6	6

Second round
15	(Slovakia) K Habšudová	6	6
(Russia) E Likhovtseva	2	2
(Indonesia) Y Basuki	5	6	6
(Romania) R Dragomir	7	4	8
(United States) N Arendt	6	6
Q	(Italy) L Golarsa	2	2
(Germany) J Kandarr	4	0
4	(Czech Republic) J Novotná	6	6

Third round
15	(Slovakia) K Habšudová	3	2
(Romania) R Dragomir	6	6
(United States) N Arendt	3	6	6
4	(Czech Republic) J Novotná	6	4	4

Fourth round
(Romania) R Dragomir	6	6
(United States) N Arendt	1	1

==== Section 7 ====
First round
7	(Spain) C Martínez	4	6	6
WC	(France) É Loit	6	2	3
(United States) C Rubin	7^{7}	7
(Argentina) M Díaz Oliva	6^{5}	5
WC	(France) C Dhenin	6^{7}	6	6
(Belgium) S Appelmans	7^{9}	2	1
(Croatia) S Talaja	7	6
Q	(Germany) M Kochta	5	3
(Germany) M Babel	1	6	6
Q	(France) E Curutchet	6	4	2
(Austria) S Dopfer	3	4
(Czech Republic) H Suková	6	6
(Czech Republic) D Chládková	4	0
(United States) A Frazier	6	6
(Italy) R Grande	4	0
11	(South Africa) A Coetzer	6	6

Second round
7	(Spain) C Martínez	6	6
(United States) C Rubin	3	0
WC	(France) C Dhenin	6	7
(Croatia) S Talaja	2	5
(Germany) M Babel	4	6	12
(Czech Republic) H Suková	6	4	10
(United States) A Frazier	6^{5}	4
11	(South Africa) A Coetzer	7^{7}	6

Third round
7	(Spain) C Martínez	6	6
WC	(France) C Dhenin	2	1
(Germany) M Babel	4	2
11	(South Africa) A Coetzer	6	6

Fourth round
7	(Spain) C Martínez	7^{7}	4	3
11	(South Africa) A Coetzer	6^{4}	6	6

==== Section 8 ====
First round
13	(Romania) I Spîrlea	6	6
Q	(United States) J Lee	1	0
(Poland) A Olsza	3	3
(Argentina) I Gorrochategui	6	6
(Spain) Á Montolio	0	0
(Spain) V Ruano Pascual	6	6
(Australia) A Ellwood	2	6	3
WC	(France) A Cocheteux	6	3	6
(Japan) N Kijimuta	6	6
WC	(France) L Andretto	3	3
(Spain) M Serna	7^{7}	6
(United States) L Wild	6^{4}	0
WC	(France) A Mauresmo	6	6
(United States) J Watanabe	3	4
(Argentina) P Suárez	1	4
2	(Germany) S Graf	6	6

Second round
13	(Romania) I Spîrlea	6	4	6
(Argentina) I Gorrochategui	4	6	2
(Spain) V Ruano Pascual	6	6
WC	(France) A Cocheteux	4	2
(Japan) N Kijimuta	6	4	2
(Spain) M Serna	3	6	6
WC	(France) A Mauresmo	3	3
2	(Germany) S Graf	6	6

Third round
13	(Romania) I Spîrlea	6	6
(Spain) V Ruano Pascual	1	1
(Spain) M Serna	6^{4}	1
2	(Germany) S Graf	7^{7}	6

Fourth round
13	(Romania) I Spîrlea	7^{7}	2	2
2	(Germany) S Graf	6^{4}	6	6

Preceded by 1997 Australian Open – Women's singles	Grand Slam women's singles	Succeeded by 1997 Wimbledon Championships – Women's singles
