= 1997 French Open – Women's doubles =

Women's doubles
- 1997 French Open

Final
- Champions: (United States) Gigi Fernández (Belarus) Natasha Zvereva
- Runners-up: (United States) Mary Joe Fernández (United States) Lisa Raymond
- Score: 6–2, 6–3

Details
- Draw: 64 (4 WC )
- Seeds: 16

Events
Singles	men	women		boys	girls
Doubles	men	women	mixed	boys	girls
WC Singles	men	women	quad
WC Doubles	men	women	quad
Legends	−45	45+	women
← 1996 ·	French Open	· 1998 →

Lindsay Davenport and Mary Joe Fernández were the defending champions, but played this year with different partners. Davenport teamed up with Jana Novotná and lost in third round to Conchita Martínez and Patricia Tarabini, while Fernández teamed up with Lisa Raymond, losing in the final.

Gigi Fernández and Natasha Zvereva won the title, defeating Fernández and Raymond 6–2, 6–3 in the final. It was the 6th French Open title, 16th Grand Slam title and 68th overall doubles title for Fernández, and the 6th French Open title, 17th Grand Slam title and 66th overall doubles title for Zvereva, in their respective careers.

== Seeds ==
1. (United States) Gigi Fernández / (Belarus) Natasha Zvereva (champions)
2. (United States) Lindsay Davenport / (Czech Republic) Jana Novotná (third round)
3. (Switzerland) Martina Hingis / (Spain) Arantxa Sánchez Vicario (semifinals)
4. (Latvia) Larisa Neiland / (Czech Republic) Helena Suková (quarterfinals)
5. (United States) Mary Joe Fernández / (United States) Lisa Raymond (final)
6. (United States) Nicole Arendt / (Netherlands) Manon Bollegraf (quarterfinals)
7. (Indonesia) Yayuk Basuki / (Netherlands) Caroline Vis (quarterfinals)
8. (France) Alexandra Fusai / (France) Nathalie Tauziat (semifinals)
9. (United States) Katrina Adams / (United States) Lori McNeil (second round)
10. (Spain) Conchita Martínez / (Argentina) Patricia Tarabini (quarterfinals)
11. (Japan) Naoko Kijimuta / (Japan) Nana Miyagi (third round)
12. (Belgium) Sabine Appelmans / (Netherlands) Miriam Oremans (first round)
13. (United States) Amy Frazier / (United States) Kimberly Po (second round)
14. (Netherlands) Kristie Boogert / (Romania) Irina Spîrlea (second round)
15. (Russia) Anna Kournikova / (Russia) Elena Likhovtseva (third round)
16. (Romania) Ruxandra Dragomir / (Croatia) Iva Majoli (third round)

== Draw ==
=== Key ===
- Q = Qualifier
- WC = Wild card
- LL = Lucky loser
- Alt = Alternate
- SE = Special exempt
- PR = Protected ranking
- ITF = ITF entry
- JE = Junior exempt
- w/o = Walkover
- r = Retired
- d = Defaulted
- SR = Special ranking

=== Finals ===
Quarterfinals
1	(United States) Gigi Fernández (Belarus) Natasha Zvereva	7^{7}	1	6
6	(United States) Nicole Arendt (Netherlands) Manon Bollegraf	6^{3}	6	3
3	(Switzerland) Martina Hingis (Spain) Arantxa Sánchez Vicario	7^{7}	7
7	(Indonesia) Yayuk Basuki (Netherlands) Caroline Vis	6^{3}	5
5	(United States) Mary Joe Fernández (United States) Lisa Raymond	6	6
4	(Latvia) Larisa Neiland (Czech Republic) Helena Suková	2	3
8	(France) Alexandra Fusai (France) Nathalie Tauziat	6	6
10	(Spain) Conchita Martínez (Argentina) Patricia Tarabini	2	4

Semifinals
1	(United States) Gigi Fernández (Belarus) Natasha Zvereva	3	7^{7}	10
3	(Switzerland) Martina Hingis (Spain) Arantxa Sánchez Vicario	6	6^{3}	8
5	(United States) Mary Joe Fernández (United States) Lisa Raymond	3	6	6
8	(France) Alexandra Fusai (France) Nathalie Tauziat	6	4	1

Final
1	(United States) Gigi Fernández (Belarus) Natasha Zvereva	6	6
5	(United States) Mary Joe Fernández (United States) Lisa Raymond	2	3

=== Top half ===
==== Section 1 ====
First round
1	(United States) G Fernández (Belarus) N Zvereva	6	6
(United States) A Grossman (Slovakia) K Habšudová	0	0
(United States) D Graham (Australia) K Kunce	6	6^{5}	1
WC	(France) E Curutchet (France) S Georges	3	7^{7}	6
(Germany) Ad Barna (Germany) An Barna	2	5
(Slovakia) H Nagyová (Switzerland) P Schnyder	6	7
(United States) C Rubin (Netherlands) B Schultz-McCarthy	2	7	6
12	(Belgium) S Appelmans (Netherlands) M Oremans	6	5	3
16	(Romania) R Dragomir (Croatia) I Majoli	6	6
(Germany) B Rittner (Belgium) D van Roost	4	2
(Australia) A Ellwood (Australia) R McQuillan	3	1
(Germany) W Probst (Japan) A Sugiyama	6	6
WC	(France) É Loit (France) A Mauresmo	6	6
(South Africa) M de Swardt (Hungary) A Temesvári	3	4
(Germany) K Freye (Netherlands) S Noorlander	1	0
6	(United States) N Arendt (Netherlands) M Bollegraf	6	6

Second round
1	(United States) G Fernández (Belarus) N Zvereva	6	6
WC	(France) E Curutchet (France) S Georges	1	3
(Slovakia) H Nagyová (Switzerland) P Schnyder	6	6
(United States) C Rubin (Netherlands) B Schultz-McCarthy	1	2
16	(Romania) R Dragomir (Croatia) I Majoli	5	6	6
(Germany) W Probst (Japan) A Sugiyama	7	4	2
WC	(France) É Loit (France) A Mauresmo	6	3	7
6	(United States) N Arendt (Netherlands) M Bollegraf	3	6	9

Third round
1	(United States) G Fernández (Belarus) N Zvereva	6	6
(Slovakia) H Nagyová (Switzerland) P Schnyder	4	2
16	(Romania) R Dragomir (Croatia) I Majoli	7	4	5
6	(United States) N Arendt (Netherlands) M Bollegraf	5	6	7

Quarterfinals
1	(United States) G Fernández (Belarus) N Zvereva	7^{7}	1	6
6	(United States) N Arendt (Netherlands) M Bollegraf	6^{3}	6	3

==== Section 2 ====
First round
3	(Switzerland) M Hingis (Spain) A Sánchez Vicario	6	7^{7}
(Italy) R Grande (Australia) KA Guse	3	6^{2}
(France) C Dhenin (France) S Pitkowski	4	2
(Belgium) N Feber (Canada) P Hy-Boulais	6	6
(Romania) C Cristea (Spain) V Ruano Pascual	3	6	5
(Italy) S Farina (Italy) G Pizzichini	6	3	7
(Poland) M Grzybowska (Poland) A Olsza	1	4
14	(Netherlands) K Boogert (Romania) I Spîrlea	6	6
9	(United States) K Adams (United States) L McNeil	4	6	6
(Slovenia) T Križan (France) N van Lottum	6	2	4
(Czech Republic) P Langrová (Czech Republic) L Němečková	3	2
(Argentina) M Paz (Canada) R Simpson	6	6
(Argentina) I Gorrochategui (United States) L Wild	6	6
(Germany) S Meier (Austria) B Schwartz	3	1
(Ukraine) O Lugina (Bulgaria) E Pampoulova	3	2
7	(Indonesia) Y Basuki (Netherlands) C Vis	6	6

Second round
3	(Switzerland) M Hingis (Spain) A Sánchez Vicario	6	6
(Belgium) N Feber (Canada) P Hy-Boulais	4	0
(Italy) S Farina (Italy) G Pizzichini	7	1	6
14	(Netherlands) K Boogert (Romania) I Spîrlea	5	6	2
9	(United States) K Adams (United States) L McNeil	4	3
(Argentina) M Paz (Canada) R Simpson	6	6
(Argentina) I Gorrochategui (United States) L Wild	3	3
7	(Indonesia) Y Basuki (Netherlands) C Vis	6	6

Third round
3	(Switzerland) M Hingis (Spain) A Sánchez Vicario	6	6
(Italy) S Farina (Italy) G Pizzichini	4	1
(Argentina) M Paz (Canada) R Simpson	4	6	3
7	(Indonesia) Y Basuki (Netherlands) C Vis	6	3	6

Quarterfinals
3	(Switzerland) M Hingis (Spain) A Sánchez Vicario	7^{7}	7
7	(Indonesia) Y Basuki (Netherlands) C Vis	6^{3}	5

=== Bottom half ===
==== Section 3 ====
First round
5	(United States) MJ Fernández (United States) L Raymond	6	6
(United States) C Morariu (France) AG Sidot	1	3
(Japan) M Saeki (Japan) Y Yoshida	7^{7}	6
(Bulgaria) S Krivencheva (Russia) E Makarova	6^{4}	3
(Belgium) E Callens (United States) G Helgeson-Nielsen	7	1	6
(Argentina) L Montalvo (Argentina) P Suárez	5	6	2
(Australia) D Jones (Thailand) T Tanasugarn	6	4	4
13	(United States) A Frazier (United States) K Po	3	6	6
11	(Japan) N Kijimuta (Japan) N Miyagi	6	6
(Czech Republic) R Bobková (Czech Republic) E Melicharová	3	1
(Hungary) V Csurgó (South Africa) L Horn	6	6
WC	(France) S Berger (France) K Jagieniak	2	3
(Croatia) M Murić (United States) T Whitlinger-Jones	2	6	3
(United States) E deLone (Slovakia) R Zrubáková	6	4	6
(Australia) C Barclay (United Kingdom) C Wood	2	3
4	(Latvia) L Neiland (Czech Republic) H Suková	6	6

Second round
5	(United States) MJ Fernández (United States) L Raymond	6	6
(Japan) M Saeki (Japan) Y Yoshida	1	2
(Belgium) E Callens (United States) G Helgeson-Nielsen	7^{7}	6
13	(United States) A Frazier (United States) K Po	6^{3}	1
11	(Japan) N Kijimuta (Japan) N Miyagi	6	6
(Hungary) V Csurgó (South Africa) L Horn	3	3
(United States) E deLone (Slovakia) R Zrubáková	4	1
4	(Latvia) L Neiland (Czech Republic) H Suková	6	6

Third round
5	(United States) MJ Fernández (United States) L Raymond	4	6	6
(Belgium) E Callens (United States) G Helgeson-Nielsen	6	3	4
11	(Japan) N Kijimuta (Japan) N Miyagi	1	2
4	(Latvia) L Neiland (Czech Republic) H Suková	6	6

Quarterfinals
5	(United States) MJ Fernández (United States) L Raymond	6	6
4	(Latvia) L Neiland (Czech Republic) H Suková	2	3

==== Section 4 ====
First round
8	(France) A Fusai (France) N Tauziat	6	6
(South Korea) S-h Park (Chinese Taipei) S-t Wang	3	4
WC	(France) N Dechy (France) L Ghirardi-Rubbi	4	4
(Japan) R Hiraki (Argentina) F Labat	6	6
PR	(Germany) M Babel (Italy) L Golarsa	6	6
(South Africa) R Nideffer (United States) K Rinaldi-Stunkel	0	2
(Czech Republic) E Martincová (Czech Republic) H Vildová	6	1	4
15	(Russia) A Kournikova (Russia) E Likhovtseva	4	6	6
10	(Spain) C Martínez (Argentina) P Tarabini	6	6
(France) A Dechaume-Balleret (France) S Testud	3	3
(South Africa) A Coetzer (France) M Pierce	6	6
(Canada) S Jeyaseelan (United States) J Lee	4	4
(Sweden) Å Carlsson (Italy) F Perfetti	4	5
(Germany) A Huber (United States) M Seles	6	7
(Australia) L Pleming (Australia) N Pratt	0	1
2	(United States) L Davenport (Czech Republic) J Novotná	6	6

Second round
8	(France) A Fusai (France) N Tauziat	6	6
(Japan) R Hiraki (Argentina) F Labat	4	3
PR	(Germany) M Babel (Italy) L Golarsa	6^{4}	1
15	(Russia) A Kournikova (Russia) E Likhovtseva	7^{7}	6
10	(Spain) C Martínez (Argentina) P Tarabini	w/o
(South Africa) A Coetzer (France) M Pierce
(Germany) A Huber (United States) M Seles	5	6^{3}
2	(United States) L Davenport (Czech Republic) J Novotná	7	7^{7}

Third round
8	(France) A Fusai (France) N Tauziat	6	6
15	(Russia) A Kournikova (Russia) E Likhovtseva	3	4
10	(Spain) C Martínez (Argentina) P Tarabini	5	6	6
2	(United States) L Davenport (Czech Republic) J Novotná	7	4	4

Quarterfinals
8	(France) A Fusai (France) N Tauziat	6	6
10	(Spain) C Martínez (Argentina) P Tarabini	2	4
