= Oana Elena Golimbioschi =

Romanian tennis player

- Country (sports): Romania
- Born: 21 May 1980 (age 46)
- Plays: Right-handed (two-handed backhand)
- Prize money: $71,752

Singles
- Career record: 265–245
- Career titles: 2 ITF
- Highest ranking: No. 266 (13 April 1998)

Doubles
- Career record: 110–127
- Career titles: 6 ITF
- Highest ranking: No. 290 (5 October 1998)

Team competitions
- Fed Cup: 1–2

Oana Elena Golimbioschi (born 21 May 1980) is a former professional tennis player from Romania.

A right-handed player based in Italy, Golimbioschi began competing on the professional tour in 1996. She won her two ITF singles titles in 1997, then the following year reached her best ranking of 266 in the world.

In doubles, she has a career-high ranking of 290 and won six ITF titles. She featured in three Fed Cup ties for Romania as a doubles player in 1998, with her only win coming in a rubber against Latvian pairing Agnese Gustmane and Līga Dekmeijere (partnering Raluca Sandu).

== ITF finals ==
=== Singles (2–9) ===
Result	No.	Date	Tournament	Surface	Opponent	Score
Win	1.	20 April 1997	Bari, Italy	Clay	(Italy) Germana Di Natale	7–5, 6–2
Win	2.	27 April 1997	San Severo, Italy	Clay	(Russia) Olga Ivanova	6–3, 6–2
Loss	3.	12 April 1999	San Severo, Italy	Clay	(Russia) Lina Krasnoroutskaya	3–6, 0–6
Loss	4.	25 April 1999	Bari, Italy	Clay	(Spain) Laura Pena	6–2, 4–6, 1–6
Loss	5.	28 November 1999	Mallorca, Spain	Clay	(Germany) Gabriela Kučerová	1–6, 2–6
Loss	6.	21 May 2000	Casale, Italy	Clay	(France) Stéphanie Rizzi	3–6, 6–7^{(5–7)}
Loss	7.	1 October 2000	Makarska, Croatia	Clay	(Czech Republic) Zuzana Ondrášková	2–6, 2–6
Loss	8.	28 July 2002	Gardone Val Trompia, Italy	Clay	(Slovakia) Dominika Nociarová	0–6, 3–6
Loss	9.	30 September 2002	Ciampino, Italy	Clay	(Netherlands) Michelle Gerards	0–6, 4–6
Loss	10.	11 May 2003	Lecce, Italy	Clay	(Italy) Emily Stellato	6–4, 1–6, 3–6
Loss	11.	2 September 2006	Vittoria, Italy	Clay	(Italy) Anna-Giulia Remondina	0–6, 4–6

=== Doubles (6–12) ===
Result	No.	Date	Tournament	Surface	Partner	Opponents	Score
Loss	1.	7 April 1997	Galatina, Italy	Clay	(Italy) Laura Fodorean	(Czech Republic) Olga Hostáková (Czech Republic) Zdeňka Málková	6–3, 2–6, 4–6
Win	2.	5 October 1997	Lecce, Italy	Clay	(Italy) Katia Altilia	(France) Sylvie Sallaberry (Belgium) Audrey Wilmart	6–0, 6–2
Loss	3.	26 January 1998	Dinan, France	Clay (i)	(Italy) Tathiana Garbin	(France) Camille Pin (France) Aurélie Védy	w/o
Loss	4.	29 March 1999	Pontevedra, Spain	Hard	(Romania) Magda Mihalache	(United States) Dawn Buth (United States) Rebecca Jensen	6–7^{(7)}, 6–7^{(5)}
Loss	5.	12 April 1999	San Severo, Italy	Clay	(Romania) Mihaela Moldovan	(Netherlands) Natascha de Kramer (Spain) Laura Pena	5–7, 0–6
Loss	6.	22 April 2000	San Severo, Italy	Clay	(Bulgaria) Svetlana Krivencheva	(Netherlands) Debby Haak (Netherlands) Lotty Seelen	4–6, 3–6
Loss	7.	20 August 2000	Aosta, Italy	Clay	(Romania) Andreea Ehritt-Vanc	(Italy) Maria Elena Camerin (Italy) Mara Santangelo	5–7, 6–4, 1–6
Loss	8.	3 September 2000	Spoleto, Italy	Clay	(Romania) Andreea Ehritt-Vanc	(Italy) Maria Elena Camerin (Italy) Mara Santangelo	w/o
Loss	9.	18 September 2000	Makarska, Croatia	Clay	(Hungary) Eszter Molnár	(Netherlands) Anouk Sterk (Netherlands) Anouk Sinnige	4–6, 6–7^{(2–7)}
Loss	10.	16 October 2000	Chieti, İtaly	Clay	(Romania) Andreea Ehritt-Vanc	(Argentina) Erica Krauth (Argentina) Vanesa Krauth	5–4(5), 1–4, 2–4, 1–4
Loss	11.	5 February 2001	Mallorca, Spain	Clay	(Romania) Andreea Ehritt-Vanc	(Spain) Rosa María Andrés Rodríguez (Russia) Dinara Safina	2–6, 0–6
Win	12.	27 May 2001	Casale, Italy	Clay	(Italy) Giulia Baldoni	(Australia) Jenny Belobrajdic (Australia) Rochelle Rosenfield	6–1, 0–6, 6–4
Win	13.	25 August 2002	Civitanova Marche, Italy	Clay	(Italy) Silvia Disderi	(Italy) Nicole Clerico (Russia) Irina Smirnova	6–3, 6–2
Loss	14.	30 September 2002	Ciampino, Italy	Clay	(Hungary) Eszter Molnár	(Italy) Alice Canepa (Italy) Emily Stellato	1–6, 6–4, 2–6
Loss	15.	31 March 2003	Naples, Italy	Clay	(Hungary) Eszter Molnár	(Austria) Stefanie Haidner (Brazil) Vanessa Menga	6–7^{(6–8)}, 3–6
Win	16.	11 May 2003	Lecce, Italy	Clay	(Czech Republic) Lenka Šnajdrová	(Italy) Sara Errani (Italy) Nancy Rustignoli	6–3, ret.
Win	17.	24 August 2003	San Marino	Clay	(France) Aurélie Védy	(France) Kildine Chevalier (Greece) Christina Zachariadou	2–6, 7–6^{(9–7)}, 6–4
Win	18.	25 July 2004	Ancona, Italy	Clay	(France) Aurélie Védy	(Croatia) Nadja Pavic (Sweden) Aleksandra Srndovic	6–3, 6–3
