= Ségolène Berger =

French tennis player

- Full name: Ségolène Berger
- Country (sports): France
- Born: 25 March 1978 (age 46); Nancy, France
- Plays: Right-handed
- Prize money: $65,616

Singles
- Career titles: 1 ITF
- Highest ranking: No. 180 (20 July 1998)

Grand Slam singles results
- French Open: 1R (1998)

Doubles
- Career titles: 1 ITF
- Highest ranking: No. 329 (2 November 1998)

Grand Slam doubles results
- French Open: 1R (1997)

Ségolène Berger (born 25 March 1978) is a former professional tennis player from France.

== Biography ==
Born in Nancy, Berger was a right-handed player who had a two-handed backhand.

Berger had a best singles ranking of 180 in the world, with her biggest title win a $25k tournament in Getxo in 1997, beating Anna Smashnova in the final.

At the 1998 French Open, she received a wild card into the main draw and lost in the first round to Barbara Rittner.

Retiring in 2005, she continues to play tennis on the ITF Senior Circuit and was early coach of French tennis player Harmony Tan.

== ITF finals ==
=== Singles (1–7) ===
Legend $25,000 tournaments $10,000 tournaments	Finals by surface Hard (0–3) Clay (1–4)

Outcome	No.	Date	Tournament	Surface	Opponents	Score
Runner-up	1.	9 October 1995	Saint-Raphaël, France	Clay	(France) Amélie Mauresmo	3–6, 2–6
Runner-up	2.	25 March 1996	Caen, France	Clay (i)	(Italy) Cristina Salvi	6–1, 3–6, 4–6
Runner-up	3.	8 April 1996	Calvi, France	Hard	(Netherlands) Linda Sentis	4–6, 6–7
Runner-up	4.	17 June 1996	Camucia, Italy	Clay	(Italy) Antonella Serra Zanetti	2–6, 6–7
Runner-up	5.	13 April 1997	Calvi, France	Hard	(France) Sophie Georges	5–7, 4–6
Winner	6.	14 July 1997	Getxo, Spain	Clay	(Israel) Anna Smashnova	3–6, 6–3, 6–1
Runner-up	7.	3 August 1997	Les Contamines, France	Hard	(France) Emmanuelle Curutchet	7–5, 6–7, 4–6
Runner-up	8.	8 August 1999	Périgueux, France	Clay	(France) Edith Nunes-Bersot	3–6, 5–7

=== Doubles (1–2) ===
Outcome	No.	Date	Location	Surface	Partner	Opponents	Score
Runner-up	1.	11 May 1997	Gelos, France	Clay	(France) Laëtitia Sanchez	(France) Lea Ghirardi (France) Karolina Jagieniak	5–7, 1–6
Winner	2.	5 April 1998	Brest, France	Hard	(France) Sophie Georges	(United Kingdom) Hannah Collin (United Kingdom) Lydia Perkins	3–6, 6–0, 6–2
Runner-up	3.	18 July 1999	Brussels, Belgium	Clay	(France) Victoria Courmes	(France) Cécile de Winne (France) Edith Nunes-Bersot	7–6, 3–6, 3–6
