= Canton of Pau-4 =

Coordinates: 43.30°N 0.38°W

The canton of Pau-4 is an administrative division of the Pyrénées-Atlantiques department, southwestern France. It was created at the French canton reorganisation which came into effect in March 2015. Its seat is in Pau.

It consists of the following communes:

1. Gelos
2. Pau (partly)
