= Daphne van de Zande =

Belgian tennis player

- Country (sports): Belgium
- Residence: Vilvoorde, Belgium
- Born: 21 July 1974 (age 51); Vilvoorde, Belgium
- Turned pro: 1994
- Retired: 2011
- Plays: Right-handed (two-handed backhand)
- Prize money: $110,118

Singles
- Career record: 178–165
- Career titles: 4 ITF
- Highest ranking: No. 161 (22 June 1998)

Grand Slam singles results
- Australian Open: Q3 (1998)
- French Open: Q2 (2000)
- Wimbledon: Q1 (1998, 2000)
- US Open: Q2 (2000)

Doubles
- Career record: 64–69
- Career titles: 3 ITF
- Highest ranking: No. 210 (5 October 1998)

Daphne van de Zande (born 21 July 1974 in Vilvoorde) is a Belgian former tennis player.

She has career-high WTA rankings of 161 in singles, achieved on 22 June 1998, and 210 in doubles, reached on 5 October 1998. Van de Zande won four singles and three doubles titles on the ITF Circuit in her career.

She made her WTA Tour main-draw debut at the 1997 Pattaya Open.

Van de Zande retired from professional tennis 2011.

== ITF Circuit finals ==
$25,000 tournaments
$10,000 tournaments

=== Singles: 8 (4 titles, 4 runner-ups) ===
Result	No.	Date	Tournament	Surface	Opponent	Score
Win	1.	30 June 1996	ITF Velp, Netherlands	Clay	(Germany) Sabine Gerke	7–5, 7–5
Loss	1.	21 July 1997	ITF Valladolid, Spain	Clay	(Germany) Meike Fröhlich	3–6, 6–4, 2–6
Win	2.	9 August 1998	ITF Rebecq, Belgium	Clay	(Germany) Lydia Steinbach	6–1, 6–3
Loss	2.	18 July 1998	ITF Brussels, Belgium	Clay	(France) Edith Nunes-Bersot	6–3, 3–6, 6–7^{(4–7)}
Win	3.	15 August 1999	ITF Rebecq, Belgium	Clay	(Germany) Martina Müller	6–3, 3–6, 6–4
Loss	3.	29 August 1999	ITF Westende, Belgium	Clay	(China) Li Na	3–6, 1–6
Win	4.	13 February 2000	ITF Mallorca, Spain	Clay	(Slovakia) Andrea Šebová	4–6, 6–3, 6–0
Loss	4.	23 April 2000	ITF Prostějov, Czech Republic	Clay	(Bulgaria) Desislava Topalova	4–6, 1–6

=== Doubles: 6 (3 titles, 3 runner-ups) ===
Result	No.	Date	Tournament	Surface	Partner	Opponents	Score
Loss	1.	17 February 1992	ITF Reims, France	Clay	(Belgium) Katrien de Craemer	(Belgium) Vicky Maes (Belgium) Sophie Woorons	6–1, 5–7, 4–6
Win	2.	20 September 1993	ITF Marseille, France	Clay	(Hungary) Andrea Noszály	(Madagascar) Dally Randriantefy (Madagascar) Natacha Randriantefy	6–0, 6–4
Loss	3.	14 August 1995	ITF Carthage, Tunisia	Clay	(Czech Republic) Denisa Chládková	(Greece) Christina Zachariadou (United States) Corina Morariu	4–6, 6–7^{(7–9)}
Loss	4.	21 July 1997	ITF Valladolid, Spain	Hard	(Slovenia) Petra Rampre	(Sweden) Sofia Finér (Sweden) Anna-Karin Svensson	4–6, 3–6
Win	5.	22 March 1998	ITF Reims, France	Clay	(Netherlands) Amanda Hopmans	(Spain) Eva Bes (Spain) Conchita Martínez Granados	6–4, 6–3
Win	6.	9 August 1998	ITF Rebecq, Belgium	Clay	(Argentina) Luciana Masante	(Belgium) Sofie Borgions (Belgium) Cindy Schuurmans	6–1, 6–4
