= Carine Bornu =

French tennis player

- Country (sports): France
- Born: 28 April 1975 (age 49)
- Prize money: $35,416

Singles
- Career record: 99–97
- Career titles: 2 ITF
- Highest ranking: No. 242 (10 July 2000)

Grand Slam singles results
- French Open: Q1 (2000)

Doubles
- Career record: 23–40
- Career titles: 2 ITF
- Highest ranking: No. 256 (18 June 2001)

Grand Slam doubles results
- French Open: 1R (2001)

Carine Bornu (born 28 April 1975) is a French former professional tennis player.

Bornu reached a career high ranking of 242 in the world and won two ITF singles titles. She won a further two ITF tournaments in doubles and competed as a wildcard the women's doubles main draw at the 2001 French Open, with Sophie Georges. They were beaten in the first round by Belgians Kim Clijsters and Laurence Courtois.

== ITF finals ==
Legend
$25,000 tournaments
$10,000 tournaments

=== Singles: 3 (2–1) ===
Outcome	No.	Date	Tournament	Surface	Opponent	Score
Runner-up	1.	19 April 1998	Cagnes-sur-Mer, France	Hard	(Belgium) Nancy Feber	0–6, 1–6
Winner	1.	28 February 1999	Faro, Portugal	Hard	(Georgia (country)) Nino Louarsabishvili	6–3, 6–3
Winner	2.	15 August 1999	Saint-Gaudens, France	Clay	(France) Anne-Laure Heitz	2–6, 6–4, 6–1

=== Doubles: 3 (2–1) ===
Outcome	No.	Date	Tournament	Surface	Partner	Opponents	Score
Runner-up	1.	30 July 2000	Les Contamines, France	Hard	(Netherlands) Kim de Weille	(France) Caroline Dhenin (Germany) Bianka Lamade	7–6^{(4)}, 4–6, 4–6
Winner	1.	25 February 2001	Algarve, Portugal	Hard	(Switzerland) Aliénor Tricerri	(United Kingdom) Alice Barnes (United Kingdom) Julie Pullin	6–3, 6–3
Winner	2.	6 May 2001	Cagnes-sur-Mer, France	Clay	(France) Caroline Dhenin	(France) Sophie Georges (France) Capucine Rousseau	6–4, 6–3
