= Magalie Lamarre =

French tennis player

- Country (sports): France
- Born: 24 February 1978 (age 48) La Pere, Aigne, France
- Height: 1.76 m (5 ft 9 in)
- Plays: Right-handed
- Prize money: $65,542

Singles
- Career record: 129–143
- Highest ranking: No. 169 (23 February 1998)

Grand Slam singles results
- French Open: 2R (1997)
- US Open: Q2 (1997)

Doubles
- Career record: 36–59
- Career titles: 1 ITF
- Highest ranking: No. 275 (30 March 1998)

Grand Slam mixed doubles results
- French Open: 2R (1997)

Magalie Lamarre (born February 24, 1978) is a French former professional tennis player.

A right-handed player, Lamarre reached a career-high ranking of 169 in the world. She twice featured in the French Open singles main draw and won her first-round match in 1997, when Barbara Schett retired hurt while down a set.

== ITF finals ==
=== Singles (0–2) ===
Result	Date	Tournament	Surface	Opponent	Score
Loss	30 March 1997	Dinard, France	Clay	(Zimbabwe) Cara Black	6–4, 4–6, 2–6
Loss	11 May 1997	Lee-on-Solent, United Kingdom	Clay	(South Africa) Jessica Steck	3–6, 2–6

=== Doubles (1–2) ===
Result	Date	Tournament	Surface	Partner	Opponents	Score
Loss	30 March 1997	Dinard, France	Clay	(Sweden) Anna-Karin Svensson	(Italy) Germana Di Natale (Italy) Federica Fortuni	4–6, 5–7
Win	18 May 1997	Le Touquet, France	Clay	(United States) Nicole Arendt	(Argentina) Luciana Masante (Argentina) Veronica Stele	6–2, 6–3
Loss	30 April 2000	Talence, France	Hard	(France) Aurore Desert	(France) Severine Beltrame (France) Samantha Schoeffel	2–6, 2–6
