= Stéphanie Rizzi =

French tennis player

- Country (sports): France
- Born: 23 August 1981 (age 43); Grenoble, France
- Plays: Right-handed
- Prize money: $45,554

Singles
- Career record: 122–146
- Career titles: 2 ITF
- Highest ranking: No. 257 (4 November 2002)

Grand Slam singles results
- French Open: Q2 (2000)

Doubles
- Career record: 24–23
- Career titles: 2 ITF
- Highest ranking: No. 497 (7 February 2000)

Stéphanie Rizzi (born 23 August 1981) is a French former professional tennis player.

A right-handed player from Grenoble, Rizzi spent her career on the ITF Circuit and reached a best ranking of 257 in the world. She won two ITF singles titles, including the $25k Les Contamines tournament in 2002.

Rizzi competed in the qualifying draw of the French Open on four occasions, without making it through to the main draw.

== ITF Circuit finals ==
$25,000 tournaments
$10,000 tournaments

=== Singles: 6 (2–4) ===
Result	No.	Date	Tournament	Surface	Opponent	Score
Win	1.	21 May 2000	ITF Casale Monferrato, Italy	Clay	(Romania) Oana Elena Golimbioschi	6–3, 7–6^{(5)}
Loss	1.	19 May 2001	ITF Turin, Italy	Clay	(France) Marion Bartoli	1–6, 1–6
Loss	2.	11 November 2001	ITF Villenave-d'Ornon, France	Clay (i)	(Belgium) Caroline Maes	2–6, 6–4, 2–6
Loss	3.	13 May 2002	ITF Casale Monferrato, Italy	Clay	(Argentina) Natalia Gussoni	4–6, 3–6
Win	2.	21 July 2002	ITF Les Contamines, France	Hard	(Hungary) Zsófia Gubacsi	0–6, 7–5, 6–4
Loss	4.	11 September 2005	ITF Vessy, Switzerland	Clay	(Germany) Tanja Ostertag	4–6, 6–7^{(17)}

=== Doubles: 4 (2–2) ===
Result	No.	Date	Tournament	Surface	Partner	Opponents	Score
Loss	1.	13 April 1997	ITF Calvi, France	Hard	(France) Laëtitia Sanchez	(France) Emmanuelle Curutchet (France) Sophie Georges	1–6, 1–6
Win	1.	11 July 1999	ITF Le Touquet, France	Clay	(France) Aurélie Védy	(Colombia) Giana Gutiérrez (Slovakia) Silvia Uricková	6–3, 6–7, 6–4
Win	2.	14 November 1999	ITF Le Havre, France	Clay	(France) Aurélie Védy	(Spain) Anna Font (Spain) Veronica Rizhik	6–4, 6–4
Loss	2.	27 January 2007	ITF Grenoble, France	Hard	(Poland) Karolina Kosińska	(France) Shérazad Benamar (France) Julie Coin	6–1, 5–7, 4–6
