= Karolina Jagieniak =

French tennis player (born 1979)

- Full name: Karolina Jagieniak
- Country (sports): France
- Born: 4 June 1979 (age 45); Warsaw, Poland
- Prize money: $106,808

Singles
- Career titles: 0 WTA / 3 ITF
- Highest ranking: No. 199 (22 February 1999)

Grand Slam singles results
- French Open: 1R (1997, 2001)

Doubles
- Career titles: 0 WTA / 1 ITF
- Highest ranking: No. 289 (8 February 1999)

Grand Slam doubles results
- French Open: 1R (1997, 2001)

Karolina Jagieniak (born 4 June 1979) is a former professional tennis player from France.

== Biography ==
Born in Warsaw, Jagieniak left Poland at the age of four for France, where her father Czesław played rugby union professionally. She began playing tennis aged six and in 1993 won the 14 & under Orange Bowl title. In 1995 she was a member of the Junior Fed Cup winning French side, which included Amélie Mauresmo. She made the quarter-finals of the girls' singles at the 1996 US Open.

Jagieniak, who turned professional at 16, made her grand slam main draw debut at the 1997 French Open as a wildcard and was beaten in the first round by sixth seed Arantxa Sánchez Vicario. She won three ITF singles titles and in 1999 broke into the top 200 of the world rankings. Her WTA Tour main draw appearances came mostly in her native Poland, receiving wildcards to compete in Sopot on three occasions. She made the second round of the 1999 Copa Colsanitas in Bogota. At the 2001 French Open she featured in the main draw for a second time.

Finishing up on the professional tour in 2001, she moved to the United States and studied at the University of Pennsylvania. She now lives in Los Angeles and works as a tennis coach.

== ITF finals ==
=== Singles (3-2) ===
Result	No.	Date	Tournament	Surface	Opponent	Score
Loss	1.	30 April 1995	Edinburgh, United Kingdom	Clay	(Czech Republic) Denisa Chládková	2–6, 2–6
Win	1.	18 February 1996	Faro, Portugal	Hard	(Netherlands) Linda Sentis	6–2, 7–6
Loss	2.	11 May 1997	Gelos, France	Clay	(France) Émilie Loit	4–6, 2–6
Win	2.	17 January 1998	Reykjavík, Iceland	Carpet	(Czech Republic) Gabriela Navrátilová	7–6, 6–0
Win	3.	24 January 1999	Båstad, Sweden	Hard	(Germany) Lisa Fritz	6–4, 7–5

=== Doubles (1-0) ===
Result	No.	Date	Tournament	Surface	Partner	Opponents	Score
Win	1.	11 May 1997	Gelos, France	Clay	(France) Lea Ghirardi	(France) Ségolène Berger (France) Laetitia Sanchez	7–5, 6–1
