= Sylvia Plischke =

Austrian tennis player

- Country (sports): Austria
- Residence: Innsbruck, Austria
- Born: 20 July 1977 (age 48) Plzeň, Czechoslovakia
- Height: 1.77 m (5 ft 10 in)
- Plays: Right-handed (two-handed backhand)
- Prize money: $660,386

Singles
- Career record: 187–184
- Career titles: 0 WTA, 2 ITF
- Highest ranking: No. 27 (21 June 1999)

Grand Slam singles results
- Australian Open: 3R (1999)
- French Open: QF (1999)
- Wimbledon: 3R (1998)
- US Open: 2R (1998, 1999, 2000)

Doubles
- Career record: 62–87
- Career titles: 1 WTA, 2 ITF
- Highest ranking: No. 78 (8 January 2001)

Team competitions
- Fed Cup: 5–6

Sylvia Plischke (Czech: Plischkeová; born 20 July 1977) is a former professional tennis player from Czechoslovakia, representing Austria. Her career-high singles ranking was No. 27 in the world, achieved in 1999.

== Biography ==
Sylvia Plischke was born in Plzeň, Czechoslovakia, to Lubomír Plischke and Alena Plischkeová. The family moved to Austria when Sylvia was six years old and Sylvia went on to represent Austria in the Fed Cup and the Olympic Games. Her mother also was an Olympian, having represented Czechoslovakia in the 1972 Summer Olympics in the high jump.

== WTA Tour finals ==
=== Doubles: 1 (title) ===
Legend
Tier I
Tier II
Tier III (1)
Tier IV & V

Result	Date	Tournament	Surface	Partner	Opponents	Score
Win	Nov 2000	Kuala Lumpur, Malaysia	Hard	(Slovakia) Henrieta Nagyová	(South Africa) Liezel Huber (Canada) Vanessa Webb	6–4, 7–6

== ITF finals ==
$100,000 tournaments
$75,000 tournaments
$50,000 tournaments
$25,000 tournaments
$10,000 tournaments

=== Singles (2–1) ===
Result	No.	Date	Tournament	Surface	Opponent	Score
Win	1.	27 June 1993	Zagreb, Croatia	Clay	(Germany) Renata Kochta	6–3, 6–0
Win	2.	10 April 1994	Limoges, France	Hard (i)	(France) Nathalie Guerrée-Spitzer	1–6, 6–4, 6–2
Loss	3.	16 February 1997	Cali, Colombia	Clay	(Spain) Laura Pena	6–7, 3–6

=== Doubles (2–3) ===
Result	No.	Date	Tournament	Surface	Partner	Opponents	Score
Loss	1.	17 July 1994	Vigo, Spain	Clay	(Czech Republic) Jitka Dubcová	(Chile) Paula Cabezas (Puerto Rico) Emilie Viqueira	3–6, 4–6
Loss	2.	27 July 1997	Istanbul, Turkey	Hard	(Germany) Marlene Weingärtner	(Italy) Laura Golarsa (Argentina) Mercedes Paz	6–3, 3–6, 3–6
Win	3.	14 December 1997	Bad Gögging, Germany	Carpet (i)	(Slovenia) Tina Križan	(France) Emmanuelle Curutchet (France) Sophie Georges	6–3, 6–3
Win	4.	12 February 2002	Sutton, United Kingdom	Carpet	(Serbia and Montenegro) Dragana Zarić	(Estonia) Maret Ani (Russia) Galina Fokina	7–5, 6–3
Loss	5.	9 June 2002	Galatina, Italy	Clay	(Morocco) Bahia Mouhtassine	(Romania) Edina Gallovits-Hall (Romania) Andreea Ehritt-Vanc	3–6, 2–6
