= 1997 French Open – Mixed doubles =

Mixed doubles
- 1997 French Open

Final
- Champions: (Japan) Rika Hiraki (India) Mahesh Bhupathi
- Runners-up: (United States) Lisa Raymond (United States) Patrick Galbraith
- Score: 6–4, 6–1

Details
- Draw: 48
- Seeds: 16

Events
Singles	men	women		boys	girls
Doubles	men	women	mixed	boys	girls
WC Singles	men	women	quad
WC Doubles	men	women	quad
Legends	−45	45+	women
- French Open

Patricia Tarabini and Javier Frana were the defending champions, but lost in third round to Rachel McQuillan and David Macpherson.

Rika Hiraki and Mahesh Bhupathi won the title, defeating Lisa Raymond and Patrick Galbraith 6–4, 6–1 in the final. It was the 1st and only Grand Slam Mixed Doubles title for Hiraki, and the 1st Grand Slam Mixed Doubles title for Bhupathi, in their respective careers. Bhupathi became the first Indian player to win a Grand Slam tournament.

== Seeds ==
The seeded players are listed below. Rika Hiraki and Mahesh Bhupathi are the champions; others show the round in which they were eliminated.
All seeds received a bye into the second round.

1. (United States) Lisa Raymond / (United States) Patrick Galbraith (final)
2. (Latvia) Larisa Neiland / (Russia) Andrei Olhovskiy (second round)
3. (Netherlands) Manon Bollegraf / (United States) Rick Leach (semifinals)
4. (Czech Republic) Helena Suková / (Czech Republic) Cyril Suk (semifinals)
5. (Netherlands) Caroline Vis / (South Africa) Byron Talbot (second round)
6. (France) Alexandra Fusai / (South Africa) David Adams (third round)
7. (Netherlands) Brenda Schultz-McCarthy / (South Africa) Piet Norval (quarterfinals)
8. (United States) Debbie Graham / (South Africa) Ellis Ferreira (third round)
9. (Russia) Anna Kournikova / (The Bahamas) Mark Knowles (quarterfinals)
10. (Romania) Irina Spîrlea / (United States) Donald Johnson (second round)
11. (Netherlands) Kristie Boogert / (Netherlands) Menno Oosting (second round)
12. (Italy) Rita Grande / (Belgium) Libor Pimek (third round)
13. (Netherlands) Miriam Oremans / (Netherlands) Hendrik Jan Davids (quarterfinals)
14. (Russia) Elena Likhovtseva / (United States) Jeff Tarango (second round)
15. (Argentina) Mercedes Paz / (Argentina) Pablo Albano (third round)
16. (Japan) Rika Hiraki / (India) Mahesh Bhupathi (champions)

== Draw ==
Key

- Q = Qualifier
- WC = Wild card
- LL = Lucky loser
- Alt = Alternate
- ITF = ITF entry
- PR = Protected ranking
- SR = Special ranking
- SE = Special exempt
- JE = Junior exempt
- JR = Junior Accelerator Programme entrant
- CO = College Accelerator Programme entrant
- NG = Next Gen Accelerator Program entrant
- w/o = Walkover
- r = Retired
- d = Defaulted

=== Finals ===
Quarterfinals
1	(United States) Lisa Raymond (United States) Patrick Galbraith	6	6
(Australia) Rachel McQuillan (Australia) David Macpherson	3	4
3	(Netherlands) Manon Bollegraf (United States) Rick Leach	6	6
7	(Netherlands) Brenda Schultz-McCarthy (South Africa) Piet Norval	2	4
13	(Netherlands) Miriam Oremans (Netherlands) Hendrik Jan Davids	2	3
4	(Czech Republic) Helena Suková (Czech Republic) Cyril Suk	6	6
16	(Japan) Rika Hiraki (India) Mahesh Bhupathi	7	6
9	(Russia) Anna Kournikova (The Bahamas) Mark Knowles	5	0

Semifinals
1	(United States) Lisa Raymond (United States) Patrick Galbraith	4	6	6
3	(Netherlands) Manon Bollegraf (United States) Rick Leach	6	2	3
4	(Czech Republic) Helena Suková (Czech Republic) Cyril Suk	4	4
16	(Japan) Rika Hiraki (India) Mahesh Bhupathi	6	6

Final
1	(United States) Lisa Raymond (United States) Patrick Galbraith	4	1
16	(Japan) Rika Hiraki (India) Mahesh Bhupathi	6	6

=== Top half ===
==== Section 1 ====
First round
(France) S Testud (Australia) P Kilderry	3	4
WC	(France) K Quentrec-Eagle (France) R Gilbert	6	6
(United States) K Rinaldi-Stunkel (United States) T Kronemann	6	7
(France) N van Lottum (South Africa) G Muller	3	5
(United States) K Adams (United States) M Keil	4	1
(Argentina) P Tarabini (Argentina) J Frana	6	6
(Australia) R McQuillan (Australia) D Macpherson	3	6	6
(Canada) S Jeyaseelan (Netherlands) T Kempers	6	4	2

Second round
1	(United States) L Raymond (United States) P Galbraith	4	6	6
WC	(France) K Quentrec-Eagle (France) R Gilbert	6	2	3
(United States) K Rinaldi-Stunkel (United States) T Kronemann	4	6	6
11	(Netherlands) K Boogert (Netherlands) M Oosting	6	3	4
10	(Romania) I Spîrlea (United States) D Johnson	6^{3}	3
(Argentina) P Tarabini (Argentina) J Frana	7^{7}	6
(Australia) R McQuillan (Australia) D Macpherson	6	7
5	(Netherlands) C Vis (South Africa) B Talbot	4	5

Third round
1	(United States) L Raymond (United States) P Galbraith	6	6
(United States) K Rinaldi-Stunkel (United States) T Kronemann	3	3
(Argentina) P Tarabini (Argentina) J Frana	2	5
(Australia) R McQuillan (Australia) D Macpherson	6	7

Quarterfinals
1	(United States) L Raymond (United States) P Galbraith	6	6
(Australia) R McQuillan (Australia) D Macpherson	3	4

==== Section 2 ====
First round
(France) A Dechaume-Balleret (France) JP Fleurian	7^{7}	6
WC	(France) A-G Sidot (France) L Roux	6^{5}	4
(Czech Republic) H Vildová (Italy) F Messori	6	6
(Japan) N Miyagi (United States) G van Emburgh	3	2
(Romania) R Dragomir (India) L Paes	6	6
(Canada) R Simpson (United States) J Grabb	2	0
(Slovenia) T Križan (Sweden) P Nyborg	3	2
(Indonesia) Y Basuki (Netherlands) T Nijssen	6	6

Second round
3	(Netherlands) M Bollegraf (United States) R Leach	6^{6}	6	6
(France) A Dechaume-Balleret (France) JP Fleurian	7^{8}	3	2
(Czech Republic) H Vildová (Italy) F Messori	3	5
15	(Argentina) M Paz (Argentina) P Albano	6	7
14	(Russia) E Likhovtseva (United States) J Tarango	6^{8}	4
(Romania) R Dragomir (India) L Paes	7^{10}	6
(Indonesia) Y Basuki (Netherlands) T Nijssen	3	5
7	(Netherlands) B Schultz-McCarthy (South Africa) P Norval	6	7

Third round
3	(Netherlands) M Bollegraf (United States) R Leach	6	3	6
15	(Argentina) M Paz (Argentina) P Albano	2	6	3
(Romania) R Dragomir (India) L Paes
7	(Netherlands) B Schultz-McCarthy (South Africa) P Norval	w/o

Quarterfinals
3	(Netherlands) M Bollegraf (United States) R Leach	6	6
7	(Netherlands) B Schultz-McCarthy (South Africa) P Norval	2	4

=== Bottom half ===
==== Section 3 ====
First round
(Argentina) L Montalvo (Argentina) L Arnold	7	6
(United States) G Helgeson-Nielsen (United States) J Waite	5	4
(Australia) L Pleming (United Kingdom) N Broad	6	6
(Australia) A Ellwood (Australia) A Florent	2	4
(United Kingdom) C Wood (Australia) J Eagle	3	5
(United States) L McNeil (United States) TJ Middleton	6	7
WC	(Spain) A Sánchez Vicario (Iran) M Bahrami	1	3
(United States) K Po (Sweden) R Bergh	6	6

Second round
8	(United States) D Graham (South Africa) E Ferreira	6	6
(Argentina) L Montalvo (Argentina) L Arnold	4	4
(Australia) L Pleming (United Kingdom) N Broad	4	6	4
13	(Netherlands) M Oremans (Netherlands) HJ Davids	6	4	6
12	(Italy) R Grande (Belgium) L Pimek	4	6	6
(United States) L McNeil (United States) TJ Middleton	6	2	4
(United States) K Po (Sweden) R Bergh	3	6	2
4	(Czech Republic) H Suková (Czech Republic) C Suk	6	4	6

Third round
8	(United States) D Graham (South Africa) E Ferreira	4	3
13	(Netherlands) M Oremans (Netherlands) HJ Davids	6	6
12	(Italy) R Grande (Belgium) L Pimek	6	1	1
4	(Czech Republic) H Suková (Czech Republic) C Suk	4	6	6

Quarterfinals
13	(Netherlands) M Oremans (Netherlands) HJ Davids	2	3
4	(Czech Republic) H Suková (Czech Republic) C Suk	6	6

==== Section 4 ====
First round
WC	(France) M Lamarre (France) O Delaître	6	6
(Germany) E Wagner (Netherlands) S Groen	2	3
(Australia) K Kunce (United States) S Davis	6^{5}	6	6
WC	(France) A Mauresmo (France) S Grosjean	7^{7}	4	3
Alt	(Argentina) F Labat (Australia) A Kratzmann	3	7^{7}	8
(United States) N Arendt (United States) L Jensen	6	6^{5}	6
(South Africa) M de Swardt (South Africa) G Stafford	2	4
(Germany) B Rittner (Germany) K Braasch	6	6

Second round
6	(France) A Fusai (South Africa) D Adams	7	6
WC	(France) M Lamarre (France) O Delaître	5	2
(Australia) K Kunce (United States) S Davis	6	2	7
16	(Japan) R Hiraki (India) M Bhupathi	2	6	9
9	(Russia) A Kournikova (The Bahamas) M Knowles	4	6	9
Alt	(Argentina) F Labat (Australia) A Kratzmann	6	3	7
(Germany) B Rittner (Germany) K Braasch	6	7^{7}
2	(Latvia) L Neiland (Russia) A Olhovskiy	3	6^{2}

Third round
6	(France) A Fusai (South Africa) D Adams	6	6^{7}	4
16	(Japan) R Hiraki (India) M Bhupathi	3	7^{9}	6
9	(Russia) A Kournikova (The Bahamas) M Knowles	6	1	7
(Germany) B Rittner (Germany) K Braasch	4	6	5

Quarterfinals
16	(Japan) R Hiraki (India) M Bhupathi	7	6
9	(Russia) A Kournikova (The Bahamas) M Knowles	5	0
