= Sophie Georges =

French tennis player (born 1977)

- Full name: Sophie Georges
- Country (sports): France
- Born: 8 February 1977 (age 48); Saint-Dizier, France
- Height: 1.62 m (5 ft 4 in)
- Plays: Right-handed
- Prize money: $125,033

Singles
- Highest ranking: No. 182 (11 June 2001)

Grand Slam singles results
- French Open: 1R (1999)

Doubles
- Highest ranking: No. 131 (27 April 1998)

Grand Slam doubles results
- French Open: 2R (1997)

Sophie Georges (born 8 February 1977) is a former professional tennis player from France.

== Biography ==
Georges was born in Saint-Dizier and started playing tennis at the age of six.

A right-handed player, Georges won her only ITF singles title at Calvi in 1997. At the 1999 French Open she featured in the main draw after being granted a wildcard and was beaten in the first round by Cristina Torrens Valero. She also appeared in the main draw of the 2001 Internationaux de Strasbourg, as a qualifier. Her career best singles ranking was 182 in the world, which she reached in June, 2001.

== ITF finals ==
=== Singles: 4 (1-3) ===
$50,000 tournaments
$25,000 tournaments
$10,000 tournaments

Outcome	No.	Date	Tournament	Surface	Opponent in the final	Score in the final
Runner-up	1.	22 October 1993	Langenthal, Switzerland	Carpet	(Switzerland) Martina Hingis	6–2, 5–7, 6–7^{(4–7)}
Winner	2.	13 April 1997	Calvi, France	Hard	(France) Ségolène Berger	7–5, 6–4
Runner-up	3.	5 April 1998	Brest, France	Hard (i)	(Bulgaria) Lubomira Bacheva	5–7, 0–6
Runner-up	4.	7 June 1998	Bytom, Poland	Clay	(Slovakia) Ľudmila Cervanová	3–6, 0–6

=== Doubles: 9 (4-5) ===
Outcome	No	Date	Tournament	Surface	Partner	Opponents in the final	Score
Winner	1.	2 February 1997	Dinan, France	Hard	(France) Cécile de Winne	(France) Émilie Loit (France) Laëtitia Sanchez	7–5, 6–2
Winner	2.	13 April 1997	Calvi, France	Hard	(France) Emmanuelle Curutchet	(France) Stéphanie Rizzi (France) Laëtitia Sanchez	6–1, 6–1
Winner	3.	3 August 1997	Les Contamines, France	Hard	(France) Emmanuelle Curutchet	(Germany) Eva Belbl (Germany) Angelika Rösch	6–2, 6–1
Runner-up	4.	14 December 1997	Bad Gögging, Germany	Carpet (i)	(France) Emmanuelle Curutchet	(Slovenia) Tina Križan (Austria) Sylvia Plischke	3–6, 3–6
Winner	5.	5 April 1998	Brest, France	Hard	(France) Ségolène Berger	(United Kingdom) Hannah Collin (United Kingdom) Lydia Perkins	3–6, 6–0, 6–2
Runner-up	6.	12 April 1998	Calvi, France	Hard	(France) Emmanuelle Curutchet	(Belgium) Nancy Feber (Germany) Jasmin Wöhr	1–4 ret.
Runner-up	7.	2 August 1998	Les Contamines, France	Hard	(France) Caroline Dhenin	(Bulgaria) Lubomira Bacheva (Germany) Jasmin Wöhr	6–2, 1–6, 3–6
Runner-up	8.	25 April 1999	Gelos, France	Clay	(Belarus) Tatiana Poutchek	(Australia) Trudi Musgrave (Australia) Bryanne Stewart	6–1, 4–6, 3–6
Runner-up	9.	6 May 2001	Cagnes-sur-Mer, France	Clay	(France) Capucine Rousseau	(France) Carine Bornu (France) Caroline Dhenin	4–6, 3–6
