= Emmanuelle Curutchet =

French tennis player

- Country (sports): France
- Born: 19 December 1978 (age 47)
- Prize money: $75,934

Singles
- Career record: 95–73
- Career titles: 3 ITF
- Highest ranking: No. 160 (22 December 1997)

Grand Slam singles results
- French Open: 2R (1999)

Doubles
- Career record: 39–31
- Career titles: 4 ITF
- Highest ranking: No. 134 (7 December 1998)

Grand Slam doubles results
- French Open: 2R (1997)

Emmanuelle Pironneau (born 19 December 1978) is a former tennis player from France. She competed during her career as Emmanuelle Curutchet.

== Biography ==
Curutchet played on the professional tour in the 1990s and had a best ranking in singles of 160 in the world.

She appeared in the women's singles main draw at the French Open on three occasions. At the 1999 French Open she won a first-round match against Jelena Dokic 11–9 in the third set. Dokic would famously upset Martina Hingis at Wimbledon a month later.

Now known as Emmanuelle Pironneau, she retired after the 1999 season and currently runs a sports management company in Pau.

== ITF finals ==
$50,000 tournaments
$25,000 tournaments
$10,000 tournaments

=== Singles: 6 (3–3) ===
Result	No.	Date	Tournament	Surface	Opponent	Score
Win	1.	16 October 1995	Joué-lès-Tours, France	Hard	(Serbia and Montenegro) Dragana Zarić	7–6^{(8–6)}, 7–6^{(7–5)}
Loss	2.	17 November 1996	Le Havre, France	Clay (i)	(France) Edith Nunes-Bersot	5–7, 6–7
Loss	3.	2 February 1997	Dinan, France	Clay (i)	(France) Émilie Loit	2–6, 6–7
Win	4.	28 June 1997	Bordeaux, France	Clay	(Germany) Julia Abe	7–6, 6–3
Win	5.	3 August 1997	Les Contamines, France	Hard	(France) Ségolène Berger	5–7, 7–6, 6–4
Loss	6.	14 February 1999	Mallorca, Spain	Clay	(Spain) Ángeles Montolio	3–6, 7–6, 1–6

=== Doubles: 7 (4–3) ===
Result	No.	Date	Tournament	Surface	Partner	Opponents	Score
Win	1.	13 April 1997	Calvi, France	Hard	(France) Sophie Georges	(France) Stéphanie Rizzi (France) Laëtitia Sanchez	6–1, 6–1
Win	2.	2 August 1997	Les Contamines, France	Hard	(France) Sophie Georges	(Germany) Eva Belbl (Germany) Angelika Rösch	6–2, 6–1
Loss	3.	14 December 1997	Bad Gögging, Germany	Carpet (i)	(France) Sophie Georges	(Slovenia) Tina Križan (Austria) Sylvia Plischke	3–6, 3–6
Loss	4.	12 April 1998	Calvi, France	Hard	(France) Sophie Georges	(Belgium) Nancy Feber (Germany) Jasmin Wöhr	1–4 ret.
Win	5.	26 April 1998	Gelos, France	Clay	(Netherlands) Yvette Basting	(Belgium) Justine Henin (France) Aurélie Védy	0–6, 7–6, 7–5
Win	6.	22 November 1998	Deauville, France	Carpet (i)	(France) Samantha Schoeffel	(Bulgaria) Lubomira Bacheva (Uzbekistan) Iroda Tulyaganova	6–1, 2–6, 7–6
Loss	7.	13 February 1999	Mallorca, Spain	Clay	(Republic of Ireland) Kelly Liggan	(Argentina) María Fernanda Landa (Spain) Ángeles Montolio	6–2, 4–6, 6–7^{(4)}
