= Vicky Maes =

Belgian tennis player

Vicky Maes (born 7 May 1974) is a former Belgian tennis player and current tennis coach.

She has career-high WTA rankings of 307 in singles, achieved on 12 July 1993, and 348 in doubles, reached on 4 July 1994. Maes won one singles and doubles titles on the ITF Circuit in her career.

She made her WTA Tour main-draw debut at the 1993 Brasil Tennis Cup.

Maes is the women's tennis coach of the Arizona Wildcats.

== ITF Circuit finals ==
$10,000 tournaments

=== Singles (1–0) ===
Result	Date	Tournament	Surface	Opponent	Score
Win	23 November 1992	ITF Buenos Aires, Argentina	Clay	(Argentina) María Fernanda Landa	6–4, 7–5

=== Doubles (1–0) ===
Result	Date	Tournament	Surface	Partner	Opponents	Score
Win	17 February 1992	ITF Reims, France	Clay	(Belgium) Sophie Woorons	(Belgium) Katrien de Craemer (Belgium) Daphne van de Zande	1–6, 7–5, 6–4
