= Caroline Dhenin =

French professional tennis player

- Country (sports): France
- Residence: Gennevilliers, France
- Born: 13 June 1973 (age 53)
- Height: 1.83 m (6 ft 0 in)
- Turned pro: September 1994
- Plays: Right-handed
- Prize money: US$403,421

Singles
- Career record: 162–168
- Career titles: 0 WTA, 2 ITF
- Highest ranking: No. 141 (9 June 1997)

Grand Slam singles results
- Australian Open: Q1 (1998)
- French Open: 3R (1997)
- Wimbledon: Q2 (1996, 1998)
- US Open: Q3 (1995)

Doubles
- Career record: 189–186
- Career titles: 0 WTA, 12 ITF
- Highest ranking: No. 49 (18 October 2004)

Grand Slam doubles results
- Australian Open: 2R (2004)
- French Open: 3R (1998)
- Wimbledon: 2R (1996, 1998, 1999, 2001, 2002)
- US Open: QF (1998)

Mixed doubles
- Career record: 1–6
- Career titles: 0

Grand Slam mixed doubles results
- French Open: 1R (1995, 1999, 2001, 2002)
- Wimbledon: 1R (2003)
- US Open: 2R (2002)

Caroline Dhenin (born 13 June 1973) is a French professional tennis player. Dhenin made the doubles semifinals twice at two tournaments—Antwerp and Strasbourg—and is a former finalist in Canberra on the WTA tour.

== WTA career finals ==
=== Doubles (0–2) ===
Winner – Legend (pre/post 2009) Grand Slam tournaments (0–0) WTA Tour Championships (0–0) Tier I / Premier Mandatory & Premier 5 (0–0) Tier II / Premier (0–0) Tier III, IV & V / International (0–2)	Titles by surface Hard (0–1) Grass (0–0) Clay (0–1) Carpet (0–0)

Result	No.	Date	Tournament	Surface	Partner	Opponents	Score
Loss	1.	May 2002	Internationaux de Strasbourg, France	Clay	(Slovenia) Maja Matevžič	(United States) Jennifer Hopkins (Croatia) Jelena Kostanić	6–0, 4–6, 4–6
Loss	2.	Jan 2004	Canberra International, Australia	Hard	(Australia) Lisa McShea	(Croatia) Jelena Kostanić (Luxembourg) Claudine Schaul	4–6, 6–7^{(3–7)}

== ITF finals ==
Legend
$100,000 tournaments
$75,000 tournaments
$50,000 tournaments
$25,000 tournaments
$15,000 tournaments
$10,000 tournaments

=== Singles (2-0) ===
Result	No.	Date	Tournament	Surface	Opponent	Score
Win	1.	12 June 1994	Burgas, Bulgaria	Clay	(Czech Republic) Monika Maštalířová	1–6, 6–0, 7–6^{(7–4)}
Win	2.	24 March 1996	Reims, France	Clay (i)	(France) Catherine Mothes-Jobkel	3–6, 6–1, 6–2

=== Doubles (12-13) ===
Result	No.	Date	Tournament	Surface	Partner	Opponents	Score
Win	1.	12 June 1994	Burgas, Bulgaria	Clay	(Federal Republic of Yugoslavia) Natalja Vojnović	(Czech Republic) Monika Maštalířová (Bulgaria) Angelina Petrova	6–4, 6–7^{(5–7)}, 7–6^{(7–4)}
Loss	2.	27 March 1995	Reims, France	Clay (i)	(Bulgaria) Svetlana Krivencheva	(Spain) Estefanía Bottini (Spain) Gala León García	6–7, 6–1, 1–6
Loss	3.	9 October 1995	Sedona, United States	Hard	(United States) Elly Hakami	(United States) Julie Steven (United States) Tami Whitlinger	3–6, 6–4, 8–10
Loss	4.	28 September 1996	Limoges, France	Hard (i)	(Belgium) Dominique Monami	(Ukraine) Natalia Medvedeva (Latvia) Larisa Neiland	1–6, 1–6
Loss	5.	19 June 1997	Marseille, France	Clay	(Georgia (country)) Nino Louarsabishvili	(Hungary) Katalin Marosi (Argentina) Veronica Stele	2–6, 6–4, 1–6
Win	6.	28 June 1997	Bordeaux, France	Clay	(Georgia (country)) Nino Louarsabishvili	(Argentina) María Fernanda Landa (Germany) Marlene Weingärtner	6–7^{(6–8)}, 6–4, 7–5
Win	7.	12 April 1998	Estoril, Portugal	Clay	(France) Émilie Loit	(Czech Republic) Radka Bobková (Germany) Caroline Schneider	6–2, 6–3
Loss	8.	2 August 1998	Les Contamines, France	Hard	(France) Sophie Georges	(Bulgaria) Lubomira Bacheva (Germany) Jasmin Wöhr	6–2, 1–6, 3–6
Loss	9.	6 December 1998	Cergy-Pontoise, France	Hard (i)	(France) Émilie Loit	(Netherlands) Kristie Boogert (France) Anne-Gaëlle Sidot	5–7, 2–6
Win	10.	1 August 1999	Les Contamines, France	Hard	(Czech Republic) Eva Melicharová	(Colombia) Giana Gutiérrez (Netherlands) Andrea van den Hurk	6–4, 6–2
Loss	11.	11 June 2000	Surbiton, United Kingdom	Gras	(Italy) Francesca Lubiani	(Australia) Trudi Musgrave (Australia) Bryanne Stewart	6–3, 3–6, 1–6
Win	12.	30 July 2000	Les Contamines, France	Hard	(Germany) Bianka Lamade	(France) Carine Bornu (Netherlands) Kim de Weille	6–7^{(4–7)}, 6–4, 6–4
Loss	13.	2 April 2001	Dubai, United Arab Emirates	Hard	(Hungary) Katalin Marosi	(Belgium) Laurence Courtois (Netherlands) Seda Noorlander	3–6, 0–6
Win	14.	6 May 2001	Cagnes-sur-Mer, France	Clay	(France) Carine Bornu	(France) Sophie Georges (France) Capucine Rousseau	6–4, 6–3
Loss	15.	18 June 2001	Marseille, France	Clay	(France) Maja Palaveršić	(New Zealand) Leanne Baker (India) Manisha Malhotra	6–7^{(5–7)}, 2–6
Loss	16.	29 July 2001	Les Contamines, France	Clay	(Australia) Rochelle Rosenfield	(Germany) Kirstin Freye (Netherlands) Anousjka van Exel	3–6, 2–6
Win	17.	28 October 2001	Saint-Raphaël, France	Hard (i)	(New Zealand) Shelley Stephens	(France) Anne-Laure Heitz (France) Élodie Le Bescond	6–0, 7–5
Win	18.	14 April 2002	Dinan, France	Clay (i)	(France) Émilie Loit	(Ukraine) Yuliya Beygelzimer (Belgium) Patty Van Acker	6–3, 6–1
Loss	19.	28 April 2002	Cagnes-sur-Mer, France	Clay	(Czech Republic) Iveta Benešová	(Madagascar) Dally Randriantefy (France) Stéphanie Cohen-Aloro	2–6, 4–6
Loss	20.	3 November 2002	Poitiers, France	Hard (i)	(France) Émilie Loit	(Bulgaria) Lubomira Bacheva (Russia) Evgenia Kulikovskaya	W/O
Win	21.	27 July 2003	Les Contamines], France	Hard	(Germany) Bianka Lamade	(France) Kildine Chevalier (Ukraine) Alexandra Kravets	6–4, 6–2
Win	22.	2 November 2003	Poitiers, France	Hard (i)	(Germany) Bianka Lamade	(Ukraine) Yuliya Beygelzimer (Belarus) Tatiana Poutchek	7–5, 6–2
Win	23.	25 July 2004	Les Contamines, France	Hard	(Czech Republic) Gabriela Navrátilová	(Australia) Evie Dominikovic (Hungary) Rita Kuti-Kis	6–4, 6–3
Loss	24.	1 May 2005	Cagnes-sur-Mer, France	Clay	(Romania) Andreea Ehritt-Vanc	(Germany) Sandra Klösel (Ukraine) Yuliya Beygelzimer	3–6, 6–3, 1–6
Win	25.	12 June 2005	Marseille, France	Clay	(Latvia) Līga Dekmeijere	(Brazil) Maria Fernanda Alves (Canada) Marie-Ève Pelletier	6–2, 1–6, 6–2
