= Julia Abe =

German tennis player (born 1976)

- Country (sports): Germany
- Born: 21 May 1976 (age 48); Bielefeld, West Germany
- Plays: Right-handed (two-handed Backhand)
- Prize money: $131,723

Singles
- Career record: 123–104
- Career titles: 0 WTA, 3 ITF
- Highest ranking: No. 111 (10 January 2000)

Grand Slam singles results
- Australian Open: 1R (2000)
- French Open: 2R (2000)

Doubles
- Career record: 36–36
- Career titles: 0 WTA, 4 ITF
- Highest ranking: No. 139 (10 April 2000)

Grand Slam doubles results
- Wimbledon: 2R (1999)

Julia Abe (born 21 May 1976) is a former professional tennis player from Germany.

== Biography ==
A right-handed player from Bielefeld, Abe was coached during her career by her father Wolfgang.

Abe turned professional at the age of 19 and won two ITF singles titles in her first year on the ITF circuit in 1996.

Her best performances on the WTA Tour were quarterfinals appearances at the 1998 Intersport Grand Prix in Hamburg and the 1999 Nokia Cup in Prostějov, both as a qualifier.

Ranked a career best 111 in the world at the beginning of 2000, she received direct entry into the Australian Open main draw, where she lost in the first round to Arantxa Sánchez Vicario.

At the 2000 French Open she had to compete in qualifying and made her way through to the main draw. She defeated Marion Maruska in the first round, then challenged top seed Martina Hingis in the second round, before going down 4–6, 5–7, having served for the second set. This was her final appearance on tour.

== ITF finals ==
$100,000 tournaments
$75,000 tournaments
$50,000 tournaments
$25,000 tournaments
$10,000 tournaments

=== Singles (3–3) ===
Result	No.	Date	Tournament	Surface	Opponent	Score
Win	1.	21 April 1996	Gelos, France	Clay	(France) Laurence Garcia-Clement	6–0, 6–4
Win	2.	15 July 1996	Darmstadt, Germany	Clay	(Romania) Raluca Sandu	6–2, 6–3
Loss	3.	28 June 1997	Bordeaux, France	Clay	(France) Emmanuelle Curutchet	6–7, 3–6
Loss	4.	3 August 1997	Horb, Germany	Clay	(Hungary) Anna Földényi	4–6, 1–6
Loss	5.	8 February 1998	Mallorca, Spain	Clay	(Spain) Lourdes Domínguez Lino	2–6, 3–6
Win	6.	3 October 1999	Tbilisi, Georgia	Clay	(Belarus) Tatiana Poutchek	6–2, 6–0
NP	7.	10 October 1999	Batumi, Georgia	Carpet	(Hungary) Katalin Marosi	NP

=== Doubles (4–1) ===
Result	No.	Date	Tournament	Surface	Partner	Opponents	Score
Win	1.	11 February 1996	Mallorca, Spain	Clay	(Germany) Anke Roos	(Spain) Nuria Llagostera (Spain) Laura Pena	6–4, 6–2
Win	2.	3 August 1997	Horb, Germany	Clay	(Australia) Renee Reid	(Romania) Magda Mihalache (Romania) Alice Pirsu	6–3, 6–3
Win	3.	23 November 1997	Deauville, France	Carpet (i)	(Bulgaria) Lubomira Bacheva	(Hungary) Katalin Marosi (Germany) Caroline Schneider	6–2, 6–4
Loss	4.	5 July 1998	Vaihingen, Germany	Clay	(Bulgaria) Lubomira Bacheva	(Belgium) Laurence Courtois (Croatia) Maja Murić	1–6, 4–6
Win	5.	2 April 2000	Norcross, United States	Hard	(Israel) Tzipora Obziler	(United States) Lindsay Lee (South Africa) Jessica Steck	5–7, 7–6^{(4)}, 6–4
