= Laura Pena =

Spanish tennis player (born 1979)

- Full name: Laura Pena Roldán
- Country (sports): Spain
- Born: 1 November 1979 (age 45); Madrid, Spain
- Prize money: $52,168

Singles
- Highest ranking: No. 158 (23 June 1997)

Doubles
- Highest ranking: No. 254 (13 September 1999)

Laura Pena Roldán (born 1 November 1979) is a former professional tennis player from Spain.

== Biography ==
Pena grew up in Seville and was ranked in the world's top 50 as a junior. In 1996 she won the Spanish Tennis Championships.

On the professional tour, she reached a best ranking of 158 and won five ITF singles titles, three of which were $25,000 tournaments. She had her best year in 1997, when she qualified for WTA Tour main draws at Bol and Cardiff, as well as competing as a wildcard in the Madrid Open.

== ITF finals ==
=== Singles (5–5) ===
Legend
$25,000 tournaments
$10,000 / $15,000 tournaments

| Outcome | No. | Date | Tournament | Surface | Opponent | Score |
|---|---|---|---|---|---|---|
| Winner | 1. | 15 July 1996 | Bilbao, Spain | Clay | (India) Nirupama Sanjeev | 1–6, 6–4, 7–5 |
| Runner-up | 2. | 24 November 1996 | Mallorca, Spain | Clay | (Spain) Eva Bes | 3–6, 5–7 |
| Winner | 3. | 16 February 1997 | Cali, Colombia | Clay | (India) Sylvia Plischke | 7–6, 6–3 |
| Runner-up | 4. | 6 December 1998 | Mallorca, Spain | Clay | (Ukraine) Julia Vakulenko | 4–6, 1–6 |
| Winner | 5. | 7 March 1999 | Albufeira, Portugal | Hard | (Spain) Ana Salas Lozano | 6–3, 6–1 |
| Winner | 6. | 25 April 1999 | Bari, Italy | Clay | (Romania) Oana Elena Golimbioschi | 2–6, 6–4, 6–1 |
| Runner-up | 7. | 9 May 1999 | Athens, Greece | Clay | (Spain) Ángeles Montolio | 0–6, 2–6 |
| Runner-up | 8. | 10 October 1999 | Girona, Spain | Clay | (Spain) Nuria Llagostera Vives | 2–6, 3–6 |
| Runner-up | 9. | 27 March 2000 | Quartu Sant'Elena, Italy | Clay | (Slovakia) Eva Fislová | 6–4, 1–6, 5–7 |
| Winner | 10. | 9 April 2000 | Cagliari, Italy | Clay | (Italy) Alice Canepa | 6–2, 6–4 |

=== Doubles (1–1) ===
| Outcome | No. | Date | Tournament | Surface | Partner | Opponents | Score |
|---|---|---|---|---|---|---|---|
| Runner-up | 1. | 11 February 1996 | Mallorca, Spain | Clay | (Spain) Nuria Llagostera | (Germany) Julia Abe (Germany) Anke Roos | 4–6, 2–6 |
| Winner | 2. | 12 April 1999 | San Severo, Italy | Clay | (Netherlands) Natascha de Kramer | (Romania) Oana Elena Golimbioschi (Romania) Mihaela Moldovan | 7–5, 6–0 |
