= Lea Ghirardi =

French tennis player

- Country (sports): France
- Residence: Paris
- Born: 10 February 1974 (age 52) Colombes
- Height: 1.73 m (5 ft 8 in)
- Turned pro: 1991
- Retired: 2002
- Plays: Right-handed (two-handed both sides)
- Prize money: $355,867

Singles
- Career record: 226–194
- Career titles: 0 WTA, 6 ITF
- Highest ranking: No. 73 (10 April 2000)

Grand Slam singles results
- Australian Open: 2R (1998, 1999)
- French Open: 2R (1995, 1997, 1999)
- Wimbledon: 1R (1995)
- US Open: 1R (1994, 1995, 1998)

Doubles
- Career record: 60–79
- Career titles: 3 ITF
- Highest ranking: 121 (6 April 1998)

Grand Slam doubles results
- Australian Open: 1R (1996, 1998)
- French Open: 2R (1996)
- Wimbledon: 1R (1996)

Grand Slam mixed doubles results
- French Open: 1R (1995)

Lea Ghirardi a.k.a. Lea Ghirardi-Rubbi (born 10 February 1974) is a former French tennis player.

Ghirardi, whose career peaked in the 1990s, was once ranked 73rd in the world.

== ITF finals ==
$50,000 tournaments
$25,000 tournaments
$10,000 tournaments

=== Singles (6–3) ===
Result	No.	Date	Tournament	Surface	Opponent	Score
Loss	1.	16 September 1991	Cluj, Romania	Hard	(Romania) Cătălina Cristea	6–2, 6–3
Loss	2.	18 November 1991	Ben Aknoun, Algeria	Hard	(Soviet Union) Karina Kuregian	6–3, 6–3
Loss	3.	25 November 1991	Bachdjerrah, Algeria	Hard	(Soviet Union) Aida Khalatian	5–7, 3–6
Win	4.	19 April 1993	Bari, Italy	Clay	(Finland) Nanne Dahlman	4–6, 7–5, 6–1
Loss	5.	31 October 1993	Poitiers, France	Hard (i)	(Belgium) Els Callens	0–6, 1–6
Win	6.	15 August 1994	Fayetteville, United States	Hard	(United States) Vickie Paynter	6–0, 6–0
Win	7.	21 November 1994	La Plata, Argentina	Clay	(Brazil) Luciana Tella	7–5, 6–1
Win	8.	9 April 2001	Columbus, United States	Hard	(United States) Mashona Washington	6–4, 6–3
Loss	9.	29 July 2001	Les Contamines, France	Hard	(Czech Republic) Eva Krejčová	1–6, 2–6

=== Doubles (3–4) ===
Result	No.	Date	Tournament	Surface	Partner	Opponents	Score
Loss	1.	16 September 1991	Cluj, Romania	Hard	(Romania) Mirela Buciu	(Romania) Diane Samungi (Romania) Cătălina Cristea	1–6, 1–6
Loss	2.	18 November 1991	Ben Aknoun, Algeria	Hard	(Belgium) Raphaella Liziero	(Soviet Union) Aida Khalatian (Soviet Union) Karina Kuregian	4–6, 2–6
Loss	3.	31 March 1997	Phoenix, United States	Hard	(Georgia (country)) Nino Louarsabishvili	(Argentina) María José Gaidano (Venezuela) María Vento-Kabchi	6–0, 6–2
Loss	4.	11 May 1997	Gelos, France	Clay	(France) Karolina Jagieniak	(France) Ségolène Berger (France) Laetitia Sanchez	7–5, 6–1
Loss	5.	2 November 1997	Poitiers, France	Hard (i)	(Bulgaria) Svetlana Krivencheva	(Belgium) Nancy Feber (Czech Republic) Petra Langrová	6–3, 3–6, 1–6
Loss	6.	29 March 1997	Woodlands, United States	Hard	(France) Nathalie Dechy	(Belgium) Els Callens (South Africa) Liezel Horn	4–6, 2–6
Loss	7.	20 June 1999	Grado, Italy	Clay	(France) Noëlle van Lottum	(Italy) Flavia Pennetta (United States) Tracy Almeda-Singian	1–6, 6–4, 6–4
