= Gelos =

- Commune
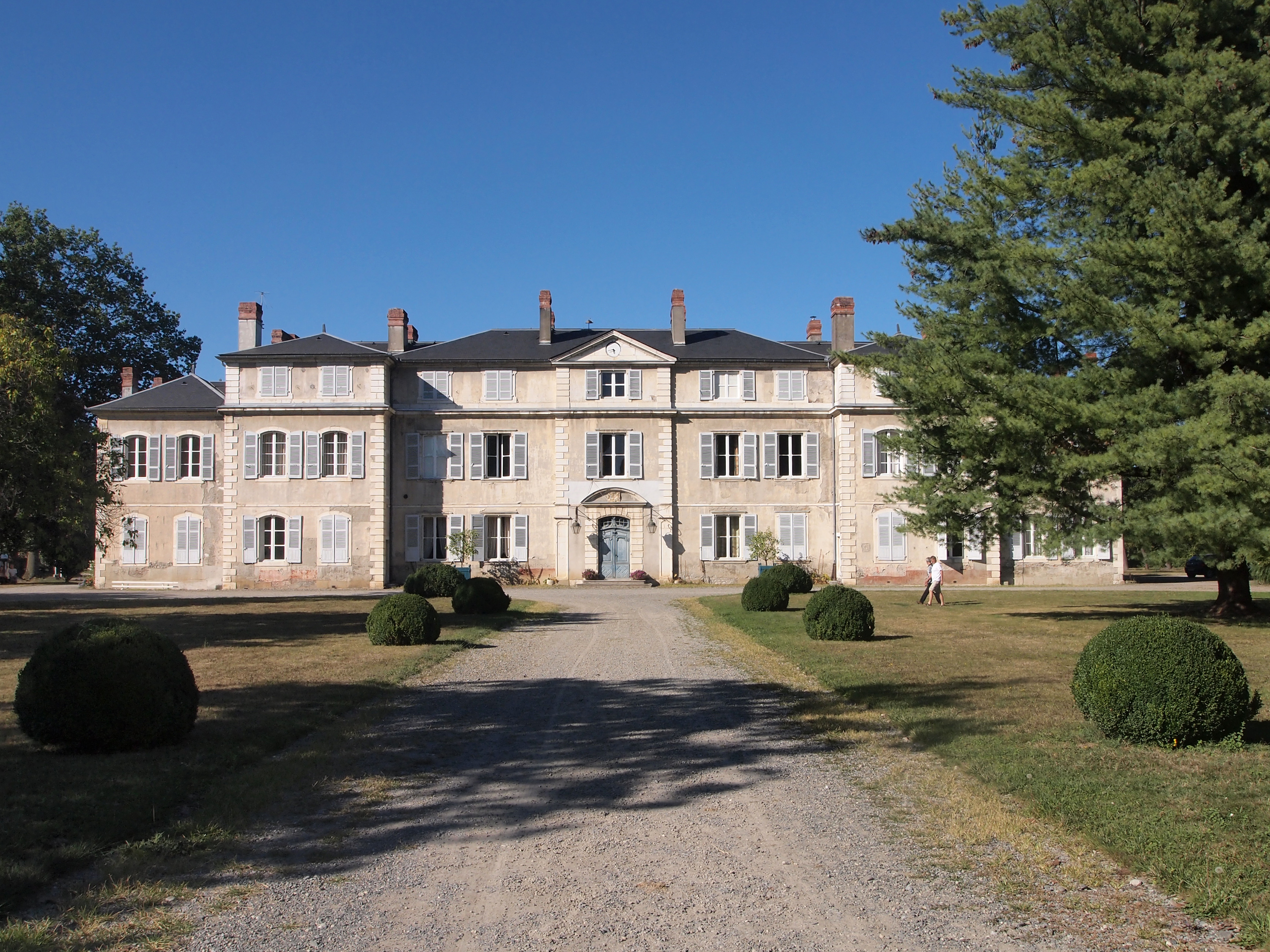
- The national stud at Gelos

- Coat of arms
- Location of Gelos
- Location within France Location within Nouvelle-Aquitaine
- Coordinates: 43°17′03″N 0°22′12″W
- Country: France
- Region: Nouvelle-Aquitaine
- Department: Pyrénées-Atlantiques
- Arrondissement: Pau
- Canton: Pau-4
- Intercommunality: CA Pau Béarn Pyrénées

Government
  - Mayor (2020–2026): Pascal Mora
- Area^{1}: 11.03 km^{2} (4.26 sq mi)
- Elevation: 189 m (620 ft)
- Highest elevation: 374 m (1,227 ft)
- Lowest elevation: 165 m (541 ft)
- Population (2023): 3,637
  - Density: 329.7/km^{2} (854.0/sq mi)
- Time zone: UTC+01:00 (CET)
  - Summer (DST): UTC+02:00 (CEST)
- INSEE/Postal code: 64237 /64110
- ^{1} French Land Register data, which excludes lakes, ponds, glaciers > 1 km^{2} (0.386 sq mi or 247 acres) and river estuaries.

Gelos (French pronunciation: [ʒəlɔs]; Occitan: Gelòs) is a commune in the Pyrénées-Atlantiques department in south-western France.

== Population ==
Historical population
Year	Pop.	±% p.a.
1968	3,367	—
1975	3,161	−0.90%
1982	3,148	−0.06%
1990	3,529	+1.44%
1999	3,666	+0.42%
2007	3,681	+0.05%
2012	3,593	−0.48%
2017	3,543	−0.28%
2023	3,637	+0.44%
Source: INSEE

== See also ==
- Communes of the Pyrénées-Atlantiques department
