= 1999 Grand Prix Hassan II – Singles =

Singles
- 1999 Grand Prix Hassan II

Final
- Champion: (Spain) Alberto Martín
- Runner-up: (Spain) Fernando Vicente
- Score: 6–3, 6–4

Details
- Draw: 32
- Seeds: 8

Events
Singles	Doubles
← 1998 ·	Grand Prix Hassan II	· 2000 →

Andrea Gaudenzi was the defending champion, but did not participate this year.

Alberto Martín won the title, defeating Fernando Vicente 6–3, 6–4 in the final.

== Seeds ==
1. (Austria) Thomas Muster (first round)
2. (Brazil) Fernando Meligeni (second round)
3. (Spain) Fernando Vicente (final)
4. (Morocco) Karim Alami (first round)
5. (Spain) Albert Portas (quarterfinals)
6. (Austria) Stefan Koubek (quarterfinals)
7. (Spain) Alberto Martín (champion)
8. (Argentina) Hernán Gumy (first round)

== Draw ==
=== Key ===
- Q = Qualifier
- WC = Wild card
- LL = Lucky loser
- Alt = Alternate
- ITF = ITF entry
- PR = Protected ranking
- SR = Special ranking
- SE = Special exempt
- JE = Junior exempt
- JR = Junior Accelerator Programme entrant
- CO = College Accelerator Programme entrant
- NG = Next Gen Accelerator Program entrant
- w/o = Walkover
- r = Retired
- d = Defaulted

=== Finals ===
Semifinals
(Austria) Markus Hipfl	1	0
3	(Spain) Fernando Vicente	6	6
Q	(Spain) Juan Carlos Ferrero	5	4
7	(Spain) Alberto Martín	7	6

Final
3	(Spain) Fernando Vicente	3	4
7	(Spain) Alberto Martín	6	6

=== Top half ===
First round
1	(Austria) T Muster	4	6	4
(Belgium) J Van Herck	6	4	6
(Argentina) G Cañas	4	6	6
(Brazil) A Sá	6	1	3
(Italy) V Santopadre	7^{7}	7^{7}
WC	(Morocco) T Ouahabi	6^{0}	6^{4}
(Austria) M Hipfl	6	6
8	(Argentina) H Gumy	3	3
3	(Spain) F Vicente	6	6
Q	(France) J Boutter	1	3
(Brazil) M Carlsson	6	7^{7}
Q	(France) C Auffray	3	6^{3}
(Argentina) E Medica	6	6
WC	(France) A Boetsch	2	4
(Italy) R Furlan	4	3
6	(Austria) S Koubek	6	6

Second round
(Belgium) J Van Herck	6	6
(Argentina) G Cañas	3	4
(Italy) V Santopadre	4	3
(Austria) M Hipfl	6	6
3	(Spain) F Vicente	6	6
(Brazil) M Carlsson	3	0
(Argentina) E Medica	5	2
6	(Austria) S Koubek	7	6

Quarter-finals
(Belgium) J Van Herck	3	6	3
(Austria) M Hipfl	6	1	6
3	(Spain) F Vicente	6	6
6	(Austria) S Koubek	2	3

Semi-finals
(Austria) M Hipfl	1	0
3	(Spain) F Vicente	6	6

=== Bottom half ===
First round
5	(Spain) A Portas	6	7^{7}
(Argentina) G Gaudio	4	6^{3}
(Spain) Á Calatrava	7	6
(Uruguay) M Filippini	5	3
Q	(Spain) J Díaz	6	7^{7}
WC	(Morocco) M El Aarej	4	6^{4}
Q	(Spain) J C Ferrero	6	4	6
4	(Morocco) K Alami	4	6	3
7	(Spain) A Martín	6	6
(Italy) M Martelli	4	1
(Germany) O Gross	6	4	6
(Spain) Ó Serrano	1	6	1
(South Africa) M Ondruska	2	5
(Germany) J Knippschild	6	7
(Romania) D Pescariu	3	3
2	(Brazil) F Meligeni	6	6

Second round
5	(Spain) A Portas	6	3	6
(Spain) Á Calatrava	2	6	1
Q	(Spain) J Díaz	2	6^{2}
Q	(Spain) J C Ferrero	6	7^{7}
7	(Spain) A Martín	6	6
(Germany) O Gross	4	1
(Germany) J Knippschild	2	7^{7}	6
2	(Brazil) F Meligeni	6	6^{5}	3

Quarter-finals
5	(Spain) A Portas	1	6^{4}
Q	(Spain) J C Ferrero	6	7^{7}
7	(Spain) A Martín	7^{7}	6
(Germany) J Knippschild	6^{3}	3

Semi-finals
Q	(Spain) J C Ferrero	5	4
7	(Spain) A Martín	7	6
