= 2000 Wimbledon Championships – Women's doubles qualifying =

Women's doubles qualifying
- 2000 Wimbledon Championships

Events
| Singles | men | women | | boys | girls |
| Doubles | men | women | mixed | boys | girls |
| WC Singles | men | women | quad |
| WC Doubles | men | women | quad |
| Legends | men | women | seniors |

Qualification
| Singles | men | women |
| Doubles | men | women |
- Wimbledon Championships

Players and pairs who neither have high enough rankings nor receive wild cards may participate in a qualifying tournament held one week before the annual Wimbledon Tennis Championships.

The qualifying rounds for the 2000 Wimbledon Championships were played from 20 to 23 June 2000 at the Bank of England Ground in Roehampton, England, United Kingdom.

== Seeds ==
1. (United States) Jennifer Hopkins / (Slovenia) Petra Rampre (qualifying competition, lucky losers)
2. (France) Caroline Dhenin / (Canada) Renata Kolbovic (qualifying competition, lucky losers)
3. (Germany) Angelika Bachmann / (Denmark) Eva Dyrberg (qualified)
4. (Australia) Evie Dominikovic / (Australia) Amanda Grahame (first round)

== Qualifiers ==
1. (Japan) Shinobu Asagoe / (United States) Samantha Reeves
2. (Germany) Angelika Bachmann / (Denmark) Eva Dyrberg
3. (United Kingdom) Helen Crook / (United Kingdom) Victoria Davies
4. (Tunisia) Selima Sfar / (Germany) Jasmin Wöhr

== Lucky losers ==
1. (United States) Jennifer Hopkins / (Slovenia) Petra Rampre
2. (France) Caroline Dhenin / (Canada) Renata Kolbovic

== Qualifying draw ==
=== First qualifier ===
First round
1 | (United States) Jennifer Hopkins (Slovenia) Petra Rampre | 3 | 6 | 6
WC | (United Kingdom) Karen Cross (United Kingdom) Joanne Ward | 6 | 3 | 2
Alt | (Japan) Shinobu Asagoe (United States) Samantha Reeves | 6 | 6
(Spain) Marta Marrero (Uzbekistan) Iroda Tulyaganova | 4 | 1

Qualifying competition
1 | (United States) Jennifer Hopkins (Slovenia) Petra Rampre | 2 | 5
Alt | (Japan) Shinobu Asagoe (United States) Samantha Reeves | 6 | 7

=== Second qualifier ===
First round
3 | (Germany) Angelika Bachmann (Denmark) Eva Dyrberg | 3 | 6 | 6
(Italy) Francesca Lubiani (Italy) Flavia Pennetta | 6 | 2 | 4
(United States) Holly Parkinson (United States) Brie Rippner | 6 | 6
(Japan) Haruka Inoue (Japan) Maiko Inoue | 4 | 2

Qualifying competition
3 | (Germany) Angelika Bachmann (Denmark) Eva Dyrberg | 6 | 6
(United States) Holly Parkinson (United States) Brie Rippner | 2 | 2

=== Third qualifier ===
First round
(Russia) Elena Bovina (Russia) Alina Jidkova | 4 | 7 | 1
(United Kingdom) Helen Crook (United Kingdom) Victoria Davies | 6 | 5 | 6
(Germany) Adriana Barna (Hungary) Virág Csurgó | 5 | 7 | 6
4 | (Australia) Evie Dominikovic (Australia) Amanda Grahame | 7 | 5 | 1

Qualifying competition
(United Kingdom) Helen Crook (United Kingdom) Victoria Davies | 7^{7} | 7^{7}
(Germany) Adriana Barna (Hungary) Virág Csurgó | 6^{5} | 6^{3}

=== Fourth qualifier ===
First round
(United States) Wendy Fix (United States) Mashona Washington | 3 | 6^{1}
(Tunisia) Selima Sfar (Germany) Jasmin Wöhr | 6 | 7^{7}
(Austria) Marion Maruska (India) Nirupama Vaidyanathan | 3 | 7^{7} | 3
2 | (France) Caroline Dhenin (Canada) Renata Kolbovic | 6 | 6^{1} | 6

Qualifying competition
(Tunisia) Selima Sfar (Germany) Jasmin Wöhr | 6 | 6
2 | (France) Caroline Dhenin (Canada) Renata Kolbovic | 3 | 4
