= 1999 US Open – Men's singles qualifying =

Men's singles qualifying
- 1999 US Open

Events
Singles	men	women		boys	girls
Doubles	men	women	mixed	boys	girls
WC Singles	men	women	quad
WC Doubles	men	women	quad
Legends	men	women	mixed

Qualification
Singles	men	women
Doubles	men	women
- US Open

The 1999 US Open – Men's singles qualifying was a series of tennis matches that took place from August 23 to 26, 1999 to determine the sixteen qualifiers into the main draw of the men's singles tournament, and, if necessary, the lucky losers.

This was the last qualifying pre-tournament appearance of future World No. 1 Roger Federer. He lost in the second round to fellow countryman Ivo Heuberger.

== Seeds ==
1. (Croatia) Ivan Ljubičić (qualifying competition, lucky loser)
2. (Belarus) Max Mirnyi (qualifying competition, lucky loser)
3. (Haiti) Ronald Agénor (second round)
4. (Switzerland) Roger Federer (second round)
5. (France) Antony Dupuis (first round)
6. (Italy) Davide Sanguinetti (first round)
7. (Italy) Laurence Tieleman (qualifying competition, lucky loser)
8. (Germany) Oliver Gross (first round)
9. (Belgium) Xavier Malisse (qualified)
10. (Netherlands) Peter Wessels (qualified)
11. (Germany) Michael Kohlmann (qualified)
12. (Romania) Adrian Voinea (second round)
13. (Switzerland) Lorenzo Manta (qualified)
14. (France) Nicolas Escudé (qualified)
15. (Germany) Axel Pretsch (qualified)
16. (Finland) Ville Liukko (qualified)
17. (Argentina) Juan Ignacio Chela (first round)
18. (Sweden) Mikael Tillström (qualifying competition, lucky loser)
19. (Uzbekistan) Oleg Ogorodov (first round)
20. (Argentina) Gastón Etlis (qualifying competition)
21. (Chile) Nicolás Massú (first round)
22. (Belarus) Vladimir Voltchkov (first round)
23. (Belgium) Christophe Rochus (second round)
24. (Italy) Vincenzo Santopadre (qualifying competition)
25. (Germany) Lars Burgsmüller (qualified)
26. (France) Julien Boutter (qualified)
27. (Germany) Alexander Popp (first round)
28. (Italy) Mosé Navarra (first round)
29. (Sweden) Fredrik Jonsson (qualified)
30. (Finland) Tuomas Ketola (qualifying competition)
31. (Germany) Christian Vinck (second round)
32. (France) Stéphane Huet (qualified)

== Qualifiers ==
1. (France) Cyril Saulnier
2. (France) Stéphane Huet
3. (Sweden) Fredrik Jonsson
4. (Switzerland) Ivo Heuberger
5. (Japan) Takao Suzuki
6. (Italy) Cristiano Caratti
7. (France) Julien Boutter
8. (Germany) Lars Burgsmüller
9. (Belgium) Xavier Malisse
10. (Netherlands) Peter Wessels
11. (Germany) Michael Kohlmann
12. (Switzerland) George Bastl
13. (Switzerland) Lorenzo Manta
14. (France) Nicolas Escudé
15. (Germany) Axel Pretsch
16. (Finland) Ville Liukko

== Lucky losers ==
1. (Croatia) Ivan Ljubičić
2. (Belarus) Max Mirnyi
3. (Italy) Laurence Tieleman
4. (Sweden) Mikael Tillström

== Qualifying draw ==
Key

- Q = Qualifier
- WC = Wild card
- LL = Lucky loser
- Alt = Alternate
- ITF = ITF entry
- PR = Protected ranking
- SR = Special ranking
- SE = Special exempt
- JE = Junior exempt
- JR = Junior Accelerator Programme entrant
- CO = College Accelerator Programme entrant
- NG = Next Gen Accelerator Program entrant
- w/o = Walkover
- r = Retired
- d = Defaulted

=== First qualifier ===
First round
1	(Croatia) Ivan Ljubičić	7	1	7
(United States) Alex O'Brien	5	6	5
(France) Gérard Solvès	6	6
WC	(United States) Mardy Fish	4	2
(France) Lionel Roux	7	5	4
(France) Cyril Saulnier	6	7	6
WC	(The Bahamas) Roger Smith	3	2
31	(Germany) Christian Vinck	6	6

Second round
1	(Croatia) Ivan Ljubičić	7	6
(France) Gérard Solvès	6	4
(France) Cyril Saulnier	6	6
31	(Germany) Christian Vinck	4	2

Qualifying competition
1	(Croatia) Ivan Ljubičić	4	6	4
(France) Cyril Saulnier	6	4	6

=== Second qualifier ===
First round
2	(Belarus) Max Mirnyi	6	6
(Brazil) André Sá	1	4
(United States) Michael Sell	6	6
WC	(United States) Tom Chicoine	1	2
(South Africa) Marcos Ondruska	3	2
(United States) Jonathan Stark	6	6
(South Africa) Kevin Ullyett	6	4	2
32	(France) Stéphane Huet	2	6	6

Second round
2	(Belarus) Max Mirnyi	6	6
(United States) Michael Sell	3	2
(United States) Jonathan Stark	6	4	6
32	(France) Stéphane Huet	2	6	7

Qualifying competition
2	(Belarus) Max Mirnyi	6	6
32	(France) Stéphane Huet	7	7

=== Third qualifier ===
First round
3	(Haiti) Ronald Agénor	6	7
(South Korea) Lee Hyung-taik	4	6
(Mexico) Alejandro Hernández	4	6	6
(South Africa) Damien Roberts	6	2	4
(South Africa) Neville Godwin	6	6
(Portugal) João Cunha e Silva	4	2
(Israel) Amir Hadad	5	1
29	(Sweden) Fredrik Jonsson	7	6

Second round
3	(Haiti) Ronald Agénor	4	5
(Mexico) Alejandro Hernández	6	7
(South Africa) Neville Godwin	6	6
29	(Sweden) Fredrik Jonsson	7	7

Qualifying competition
(Mexico) Alejandro Hernández	3	2
29	(Sweden) Fredrik Jonsson	6	6

=== Fourth qualifier ===
First round
4	(Switzerland) Roger Federer	6	6
(Netherlands) Edwin Kempes	4	4
(Switzerland) Ivo Heuberger	7	4	7
(Venezuela) Maurice Ruah	6	6	6
(Argentina) Andrés Zingman	3	2
(France) Olivier Mutis	6	6
(Czech Republic) Radovan Světlík	4	6	2
30	(Finland) Tuomas Ketola	6	4	6

Second round
4	(Switzerland) Roger Federer	6	2
(Switzerland) Ivo Heuberger	7	6
(France) Olivier Mutis	7	2	2
30	(Finland) Tuomas Ketola	6	6	6

Qualifying competition
(Switzerland) Ivo Heuberger	6	6
30	(Finland) Tuomas Ketola	3	4

=== Fifth qualifier ===
First round
5	(France) Antony Dupuis	7	4	1
(Israel) Noam Okun	5	6	6
(Netherlands) Raemon Sluiter	6	7	3
(South Africa) Louis Vosloo	7	6	6
(Czech Republic) Radomír Vašek	2	2
(Italy) Giorgio Galimberti	6	6
(Japan) Takao Suzuki	6	6
27	(Germany) Alexander Popp	3	3

Second round
(Israel) Noam Okun	6	5	6
(South Africa) Louis Vosloo	2	7	4
(Italy) Giorgio Galimberti	1	6
(Japan) Takao Suzuki	6	7

Qualifying competition
(Israel) Noam Okun	3	6
(Japan) Takao Suzuki	6	7

=== Sixth qualifier ===
First round
6	(Italy) Davide Sanguinetti	4	4
(Russia) Andrei Cherkasov	6	6
(Italy) Cristiano Caratti	6	7
(Czech Republic) David Miketa	2	5
(France) Olivier Malcor	4	6	2
(Australia) James Sekulov	6	2	6
(Romania) Gabriel Trifu	6	4
28	(Italy) Mosé Navarra	2	1^{r}

Second round
(Russia) Andrei Cherkasov	2	7	6
(Italy) Cristiano Caratti	6	6	7
(Australia) James Sekulov	1	6	6
(Romania) Gabriel Trifu	6	3	2

Qualifying competition
(Italy) Cristiano Caratti	6	7	6
(Australia) James Sekulov	7	6	1

=== Seventh qualifier ===
First round
7	(Italy) Laurence Tieleman	7	6
WC	(United States) Huntley Montgomery	6	2
(Argentina) Mariano Hood	6	7
(France) Nicolas Thomann	3	6
(United Kingdom) Jamie Delgado	3	5
(Czech Republic) Petr Luxa	6	7
(Spain) Javier Sánchez	6	5	3
26	(France) Julien Boutter	3	7	6

Second round
7	(Italy) Laurence Tieleman	6	7	6
(Argentina) Mariano Hood	7	6	4
(Czech Republic) Petr Luxa	6	4
26	(France) Julien Boutter	7	6

Qualifying competition
7	(Italy) Laurence Tieleman	7	4	6
26	(France) Julien Boutter	5	6	7

=== Eighth qualifier ===
First round
8	(Germany) Oliver Gross	4	5
(Italy) Stefano Pescosolido	6	7
(United States) Glenn Weiner	6	6
WC	(United States) Thomas Blake	3	4
(Uzbekistan) Vadim Kutsenko	6	7
(Brazil) Francisco Costa	3	5
(France) Sébastien de Chaunac	2	3
25	(Germany) Lars Burgsmüller	6	6

Second round
(Italy) Stefano Pescosolido	6	6
(United States) Glenn Weiner	4	4
(Uzbekistan) Vadim Kutsenko	2	5
25	(Germany) Lars Burgsmüller	6	7

Qualifying competition
(Italy) Stefano Pescosolido	3	6
25	(Germany) Lars Burgsmüller	6	7

=== Ninth qualifier ===
First round
9	(Belgium) Xavier Malisse	7	6
(Israel) Harel Levy	6	4
(Federal Republic of Yugoslavia) Nenad Zimonjić	2	7	3
(United States) Michael Russell	6	6	6
(Germany) Marc-Kevin Goellner	7	7
(United States) Geoff Grant	6	6
WC	(United States) Rafael de Mesa	0	4
24	(Italy) Vincenzo Santopadre	6	6

Second round
9	(Belgium) Xavier Malisse	4	6	7
(United States) Michael Russell	6	1	6
(Germany) Marc-Kevin Goellner	3	5
24	(Italy) Vincenzo Santopadre	6	7

Qualifying competition
9	(Belgium) Xavier Malisse	6	7
24	(Italy) Vincenzo Santopadre	3	6

=== Tenth qualifier ===
First round
10	(Netherlands) Peter Wessels	6	6
(Brazil) Daniel Melo	4	4
WC	(United States) Rudy Rake	5	6	7
(Slovenia) Iztok Božič	7	4	6
(Argentina) Sebastián Prieto	6	7
(Italy) Igor Gaudi	3	6
(Czech Republic) Ota Fukárek	6	6	1
23	(Belgium) Christophe Rochus	4	7	6

Second round
10	(Netherlands) Peter Wessels	6	6
WC	(United States) Rudy Rake	2	1
(Argentina) Sebastián Prieto	5	0
23	(Belgium) Christophe Rochus	7	6

Qualifying competition
10	(Netherlands) Peter Wessels	1	7	6
23	(Belgium) Christophe Rochus	6	6	1

=== Eleventh qualifier ===
First round
11	(Germany) Michael Kohlmann	7	6
(Japan) Takahiro Terachi	5	0
(Canada) Frédéric Niemeyer	6	6	6
(Japan) Gouichi Motomura	7	1	4
(Australia) Michael Hill	6	7
(India) Leander Paes	3	6
(France) Jean-René Lisnard	1	6	6
21	(Chile) Nicolás Massú	6	3	3

Second round
11	(Germany) Michael Kohlmann	6	6
(Canada) Frédéric Niemeyer	4	4
(Australia) Michael Hill	3	6	3
(France) Jean-René Lisnard	6	3	6

Qualifying competition
11	(Germany) Michael Kohlmann	6	6
(France) Jean-René Lisnard	1	0

=== Twelfth qualifier ===
First round
12	(Romania) Adrian Voinea	6	3	6
(Spain) Ignacio Truyol	3	6	2
(Israel) Noam Behr	6	6	4
(United Kingdom) Arvind Parmar	4	7	6
(United Kingdom) Martin Lee	3	0
(Switzerland) George Bastl	6	6
(Russia) Andrei Stoliarov	7	6
22	(Belarus) Vladimir Voltchkov	5	3

Second round
12	(Romania) Adrian Voinea	4	3
(United Kingdom) Arvind Parmar	6	6
(Switzerland) George Bastl	6	2	7
(Russia) Andrei Stoliarov	4	6	6

Qualifying competition
(United Kingdom) Arvind Parmar	1	3
(Switzerland) George Bastl	6	6

=== Thirteenth qualifier ===
First round
13	(Switzerland) Lorenzo Manta	6	6
(Slovakia) Roman Šmotlák	1	3
(New Zealand) Mark Nielsen	7	5	3
(New Zealand) Brett Steven	5	7	6
(United States) David Caldwell	3	2
(Venezuela) Jimy Szymanski	6	6
(Brazil) Adriano Ferreira	2	2
20	(Argentina) Gastón Etlis	6	6

Second round
13	(Switzerland) Lorenzo Manta	6	6
(New Zealand) Brett Steven	3	4
(Venezuela) Jimy Szymanski	4	4
20	(Argentina) Gastón Etlis	6	6

Qualifying competition
13	(Switzerland) Lorenzo Manta	6	4	6
20	(Argentina) Gastón Etlis	2	6	1

=== Fourteenth qualifier ===
First round
14	(France) Nicolas Escudé	6	6
(Israel) Lior Mor	1	3
WC	(United States) Mike Bryan	7	7
(Israel) Ofer Sela	6	6
(Ecuador) Luis Morejón	1	4
(Spain) Óscar Burrieza	6	6
(Israel) Eyal Ran	6	3	6
19	(Uzbekistan) Oleg Ogorodov	2	6	2

Second round
14	(France) Nicolas Escudé	6	6
WC	(United States) Mike Bryan	1	2
(Spain) Óscar Burrieza	6	7
(Israel) Eyal Ran	2	6

Qualifying competition
14	(France) Nicolas Escudé	6	6
(Spain) Óscar Burrieza	2	1

=== Fifteenth qualifier ===
First round
15	(Germany) Axel Pretsch	6	7
(South Africa) Jeff Coetzee	3	5
(Brazil) Paulo Taicher	2	6	2
WC	(United States) Hugo Armando	6	2	6
(Argentina) Diego Veronelli	2	3
(Japan) Satoshi Iwabuchi	6	6
(Thailand) Paradorn Srichaphan	6	6	6
17	(Argentina) Juan Ignacio Chela	7	4	2

Second round
15	(Germany) Axel Pretsch	7	4	6
WC	(United States) Hugo Armando	6	6	1
(Japan) Satoshi Iwabuchi	1	1
(Thailand) Paradorn Srichaphan	6	6

Qualifying competition
15	(Germany) Axel Pretsch	6	6
(Thailand) Paradorn Srichaphan	2	3

=== Sixteenth qualifier ===
First round
16	(Finland) Ville Liukko	7	6
(The Bahamas) Mark Knowles	6	4
(United States) Jared Palmer	3	6	1
(United States) Michael Joyce	6	4	6
(Czech Republic) Petr Dezort	7	6
(Australia) Michael Tebbutt	5	3
(Australia) Todd Woodbridge	6	6	4
18	(Sweden) Mikael Tillström	3	7	6

Second round
16	(Finland) Ville Liukko	6	6
(United States) Michael Joyce	3	2
(Czech Republic) Petr Dezort	6	5	2
18	(Sweden) Mikael Tillström	3	7	6

Qualifying competition
16	(Finland) Ville Liukko	7	6
18	(Sweden) Mikael Tillström	5	4
