= 2000 Grand Prix Hassan II – Doubles =

Doubles
- 2000 Grand Prix Hassan II

Final
- Champions: (France) Arnaud Clément (France) Sébastien Grosjean
- Runners-up: (Germany) Lars Burgsmüller (Australia) Andrew Painter
- Score: 7–6^{(7–4)}, 6–4

Events
Singles	Doubles
← 1999 ·	Grand Prix Hassan II	· 2001 →

Fernando Meligeni and Jaime Oncins were the defending champions, but did not participate this year.

Arnaud Clément and Sébastien Grosjean won in the final 7–6^{(7–4)}, 6–4, against Lars Burgsmüller and Andrew Painter.

== Seeds ==
1. (Italy) Massimo Bertolini / (Italy) Cristian Brandi (first round)
2. (Argentina) Lucas Arnold Ker / (Argentina) Martín García (quarterfinals)
3. (Sweden) Simon Aspelin / (Sweden) Johan Landsberg (semifinals)
4. (Japan) Thomas Shimada / (South Africa) Myles Wakefield (quarterfinals)

== Draw ==
=== Key ===
- Q = Qualifier
- WC = Wild card
- LL = Lucky loser
- Alt = Alternate
- SE = Special exempt
- PR = Protected ranking
- ITF = ITF entry
- JE = Junior exempt
- w/o = Walkover
- r = Retired
- d = Defaulted
- SR = Special ranking

=== Draw ===
First round
1	(Italy) M Bertolini (Italy) C Brandi	1	4
(Czech Republic) P Pála (Czech Republic) P Vízner	6	6
LL	(France) A Clément (France) S Grosjean	6	7
(Serbia and Montenegro) N Djordjevic (Australia) B Ellwood	0	5
3	(Sweden) S Aspelin (Sweden) J Landsberg	6	7
(United States) F Montana (United Kingdom) K Spencer	4	5
(Spain) E Benfele Álvarez (Spain) A Martín	6	6
WC	(Morocco) H Arazi (United States) M Keil	1	4
Q	(Germany) L Burgsmüller (Australia) A Painter	7^{11}	3	7
(Australia) G Silcock (South Africa) J Weir-Smith	6^{9}	6	5
(Brazil) A Prieto (Brazil) C Testa	6	3	4
4	(Japan) T Shimada (South Africa) M Wakefield	4	6	6
WC	(Argentina) P Albano (Morocco) K Alami	6	2	7^{7}
(Spain) A López Morón (Spain) A Portas	3	6	6^{3}
(Israel) N Behr (Israel) E Ran	2	2
2	(Argentina) L Arnold Ker (Argentina) M García	6	6

Quarterfinals
(Czech Republic) P Pála (Czech Republic) P Vízner	5	4
LL	(France) A Clément (France) S Grosjean	7	6
3	(Sweden) S Aspelin (Sweden) J Landsberg	7	6
(Spain) E Benfele Álvarez (Spain) A Martín	5	4
Q	(Germany) L Burgsmüller (Australia) A Painter	7	6
4	(Japan) T Shimada (South Africa) M Wakefield	5	3
WC	(Argentina) P Albano (Morocco) K Alami	0	6	7^{7}
2	(Argentina) L Arnold Ker (Argentina) M García	6	4	6^{5}

Semifinals
LL	(France) A Clément (France) S Grosjean	6	6
3	(Sweden) S Aspelin (Sweden) J Landsberg	2	4
Q	(Germany) L Burgsmüller (Australia) A Painter	3	6	6
WC	(Argentina) P Albano (Morocco) K Alami	6	3	1

Final
LL	(France) A Clément (France) S Grosjean	7^{7}	6
Q	(Germany) L Burgsmüller (Australia) A Painter	6^{4}	4
