= 2000 Wimbledon Championships – Men's doubles qualifying =

Men's doubles qualifying
- 2000 Wimbledon Championships

Events
Singles	men	women		boys	girls
Doubles	men	women	mixed	boys	girls
WC Singles	men	women	quad
WC Doubles	men	women	quad
Legends	men	women	seniors

Qualification
Singles	men	women
Doubles	men	women
- Wimbledon Championships

Players and pairs who neither have high enough rankings nor receive wild cards may participate in a qualifying tournament held one week before the annual Wimbledon Tennis Championships.

== Seeds ==
1. (United States) Adam Peterson / (United States) Jim Thomas (first round)
2. (South Africa) Paul Rosner / (South Africa) Jason Weir-Smith (first round)
3. (Germany) Lars Burgsmüller / (Germany) Michael Kohlmann (qualifying competition)
4. (Canada) Jocelyn Robichaud / (United States) Michael Sell (qualified)
5. (Mexico) Alejandro Hernández / (Brazil) Cristiano Testa (first round)
6. (Australia) Paul Hanley / (Australia) Nathan Healey (qualifying competition)
7. (Australia) Grant Silcock / (United States) Mitch Sprengelmeyer (qualifying competition)
8. (Israel) Jonathan Erlich / (Israel) Lior Mor (qualifying competition)

== Qualifiers ==
1. (United States) James Blake / (United States) Kevin Kim
2. (Italy) Stefano Pescosolido / (Italy) Vincenzo Santopadre
3. (Israel) Noam Behr / (Japan) Satoshi Iwabuchi
4. (Canada) Jocelyn Robichaud / (United States) Michael Sell

== Qualifying draw ==
=== First qualifier ===
First round
1	(United States) Adam Peterson (United States) Jim Thomas	6	6^{5}	10
(United States) James Blake (United States) Kevin Kim	1	7^{7}	12
(Argentina) Francisco Cabello (South Africa) Wesley Whitehouse	6^{10}	6^{5}
7	(Australia) Grant Silcock (United States) Mitch Sprengelmeyer	7^{12}	7^{7}

Qualifying competition
(United States) James Blake (United States) Kevin Kim	3	7^{9}	7	4	6
7	(Australia) Grant Silcock (United States) Mitch Sprengelmeyer	6	6^{7}	5	6	4

=== Second qualifier ===
First round
2	(South Africa) Paul Rosner (South Africa) Jason Weir-Smith	6	6^{10}	4
(Italy) Stefano Pescosolido (Italy) Vincenzo Santopadre	3	7^{12}	6
(Brazil) Daniel Melo (Brazil) Alexandre Simoni	6^{4}	6^{7}
8	(Israel) Jonathan Erlich (Israel) Lior Mor	7^{7}	7^{9}

Qualifying competition
(Italy) Stefano Pescosolido (Italy) Vincenzo Santopadre	7^{10}	7^{11}	6
8	(Israel) Jonathan Erlich (Israel) Lior Mor	6^{8}	6^{9}	3

=== Third qualifier ===
First round
3	(Germany) Lars Burgsmüller (Germany) Michael Kohlmann	6	6
(Australia) Andrew Painter (South Africa) Byron Talbot	4	4
(Israel) Noam Behr (Japan) Satoshi Iwabuchi	7	6
5	(Mexico) Alejandro Hernández (Brazil) Cristiano Testa	5	1

Qualifying competition
3	(Germany) Lars Burgsmüller (Germany) Michael Kohlmann	1	2	4
(Israel) Noam Behr (Japan) Satoshi Iwabuchi	6	6	6

=== Fourth qualifier ===
First round
4	(Canada) Jocelyn Robichaud (United States) Michael Sell	7	4	6
(Australia) Ashley Fisher (Australia) Lee Pearson	5	6	4
WC	(United Kingdom) Simon Dickson (United Kingdom) Tom Spinks	6	2	3
6	(Australia) Paul Hanley (Australia) Nathan Healey	3	6	6

Qualifying competition
4	(Canada) Jocelyn Robichaud (United States) Michael Sell	6	6	3	7
6	(Australia) Paul Hanley (Australia) Nathan Healey	3	2	6	5
