= 1998 Grand Prix Hassan II – Singles =

Singles
- 1998 Grand Prix Hassan II

Final
- Champion: (Italy) Andrea Gaudenzi
- Runner-up: (Spain) Álex Calatrava
- Score: 6–4, 5–7, 6–4

Details
- Draw: 32
- Seeds: 8

Events
Singles	Doubles
← 1997 ·	Grand Prix Hassan II	· 1999 →

Hicham Arazi was the defending champion, but lost in the quarterfinals this year.

Andrea Gaudenzi won the title, defeating Álex Calatrava 6–4, 5–7, 6–4 in the final.

== Seeds ==
1. (Spain) Albert Portas (quarterfinals)
2. (Morocco) Hicham Arazi (quarterfinals)
3. (Morocco) Karim Alami (semifinals)
4. (Italy) Andrea Gaudenzi (champion)
5. (Netherlands) Sjeng Schalken (second round, withdrew)
6. (Costa Rica) Juan Antonio Marín (quarterfinals)
7. (Spain) Jordi Burillo (second round)
8. (Italy) Davide Sanguinetti (second round)

== Draw ==
=== Key ===
- Q = Qualifier
- WC = Wild card
- LL = Lucky loser
- Alt = Alternate
- ITF = ITF entry
- PR = Protected ranking
- SR = Special ranking
- SE = Special exempt
- JE = Junior exempt
- JR = Junior Accelerator Programme entrant
- CO = College Accelerator Programme entrant
- NG = Next Gen Accelerator Program entrant
- w/o = Walkover
- r = Retired
- d = Defaulted

=== Finals ===
Semifinals
(Spain) Álex Calatrava	6	6^{2}	7^{8}
3	(Morocco) Karim Alami	3	7^{7}	6^{6}
4	(Italy) Andrea Gaudenzi	6	6
Q	(France) Sébastien Grosjean	4	4

Final
(Spain) Álex Calatrava	4	7	4
4	(Italy) Andrea Gaudenzi	6	5	6

=== Top half ===
First round
1	(Spain) A Portas	6	6
(Austria) G Schaller	1	4
(Germany) R Schüttler	3	2
Q	(Hungary) A Sávolt	6	6
(Argentina) F Squillari	3	3
(Spain) Á Calatrava	6	6
WC	(Morocco) M Tahiri	5	1
8	(Italy) D Sanguinetti	7	6
3	(Morocco) K Alami	6	6
(Germany) M Craca	3	2
(Italy) M Martelli	4	4
(Norway) C Ruud	6	6
(Spain) F Vicente	1	6	6
(Netherlands) J van Lottum	6	3	0
(Spain) Á López Morón	2	5
5	(Netherlands) S Schalken	6	7

Second round
1	(Spain) A Portas	6	6
Q	(Hungary) A Sávolt	3	4
(Spain) Á Calatrava	6	6
8	(Italy) D Sanguinetti	1	1
3	(Morocco) K Alami	4	6	6
(Norway) C Ruud	6	4	4
(Spain) F Vicente	w/o
5	(Netherlands) S Schalken

Quarter-finals
1	(Spain) A Portas	2	4
(Spain) Á Calatrava	6	6
3	(Morocco) K Alami	3	7^{7}	7
(Spain) F Vicente	6	6^{5}	5

Semi-finals
(Spain) Á Calatrava	6	6^{2}	7^{8}
3	(Morocco) K Alami	3	7^{7}	6^{6}

=== Bottom half ===
First round
6	(Costa Rica) J A Marín	4	6	6
(Italy) R Furlan	6	4	0
Q	(France) C Auffray	3	6	6
(Germany) J Knippschild	6	3	0
WC	(France) A Boetsch	3	6	3
Q	(France) A di Pasquale	6	4	6
(Romania) A Pavel	7^{7}	5	3
4	(Italy) A Gaudenzi	6^{2}	7	6
7	(Spain) J Burillo	6	6
(Spain) A Martín	2	4
(Germany) M Sinner	6^{4}	3
Q	(France) S Grosjean	7^{7}	6
(Spain) J Díaz	6	6
WC	(Morocco) M El Aarej	1	4
(Argentina) H Gumy	3	6	1
2	(Morocco) H Arazi	6	0	6

Second round
6	(Costa Rica) J A Marín	6	6
Q	(France) C Auffray	4	2
Q	(France) A di Pasquale	2	3
4	(Italy) A Gaudenzi	6	6
7	(Spain) J Burillo	6^{2}	5
Q	(France) S Grosjean	7^{7}	7
(Spain) J Díaz	5	2
2	(Morocco) H Arazi	7	6

Quarter-finals
6	(Costa Rica) J A Marín	7^{7}	5	2
4	(Italy) A Gaudenzi	6^{4}	7	6
Q	(France) S Grosjean	7	2	6
2	(Morocco) H Arazi	5	6	3

Semi-finals
4	(Italy) A Gaudenzi	6	6
Q	(France) S Grosjean	4	4
