= Wendy Fix =

American tennis player

- Full name: Wendy Fix Shpiz
- Country (sports): United States
- Born: January 31, 1975 (age 50)
- Height: 170 cm (5 ft 7 in)
- College: Duke University
- Prize money: $29,822

Singles
- Career titles: 1 ITF
- Highest ranking: No. 250 (July 24, 2000)

Grand Slam singles results
- Wimbledon: Q1 (2000)

Doubles
- Career titles: 3 ITF
- Highest ranking: No. 163 (February 28, 2000)

Grand Slam doubles results
- Wimbledon: Q1 (2000)

Wendy Fix Shpiz (born January 31, 1975) is an American former professional tennis player.

== Biography ==
Fix, who grew up in Winnetka, IL, was the 1992 Illinois state singles champion. Prior to turning professional she played college tennis at Duke University and earned All-American honors in 1997.

On the professional tour, Fix reached a best singles ranking of 250 in the world and was a doubles quarter-finalist at the Kuala Lumpur WTA Tour tournament in 1999. She featured in both the singles and doubles qualifying draws for the 2000 Wimbledon Championships. Retiring from the tour in 2000, she later took up the sport of paddle tennis.

== ITF Circuit finals ==
$25,000 tournaments
$10,000 tournaments

=== Singles: 2 (1–1) ===
Result	Date	Tournament	Surface	Opponent	Score
Win	September 6, 1998	Vila do Conde, Portugal	Hard	(Czech Republic) Darina Mecova	6–2, 6–2
Loss	September 13, 1998	Póvoa de Varzim, Portugal	Hard	(Spain) Marta Marrero	0–6, 0–6

=== Doubles: 4 (3–1) ===
Result	Date	Tournament	Surface	Partner	Opponents	Score
Win	November 23, 1997	Caracas, Venezuela	Hard	(United States) Katie Schlukebir	(United Kingdom) Joanne Moore (United States) Rebecca Jensen	6–7^{(6–8)}, 6–4, 5–7
Loss	June 13, 1999	Hilton Head, United States	Hard	(United States) Lindsay Lee-Waters	(Canada) Vanessa Webb (United States) Dawn Buth	2–6, 6–4, 3–6
Win	June 20, 1999	Mount Pleasant, United States	Hard	(United States) Lindsay Lee-Waters	(Slovenia) Petra Rampre (United States) Jennifer Hopkins	6–3, 7–6^{(9–7)}
Win	June 11, 2000	Hilton Head, United States	Hard	(India) Manisha Malhotra	(Venezuela) Milagros Sequera (Slovakia) Gabriela Voleková	4–6, 6–7^{(3–7)}
