= Francisco Cabello (tennis) =

Argentine tennis player

- Country (sports): Argentina
- Born: 6 December 1972 (age 52); Santa Fe, Argentina
- Height: 1.90 m (6 ft 3 in)
- Turned pro: 1994
- Plays: Right-handed
- Prize money: $177,975

Singles
- Career record: 2–5
- Career titles: 0
- Highest ranking: No. 119 (6 Apr 1998)

Grand Slam singles results
- French Open: Q3 (1998, 1999)
- Wimbledon: Q3 (2000)
- US Open: Q1 (1998)

Doubles
- Career record: 2–7
- Career titles: 0
- Highest ranking: No. 122 (13 Sep 1999)

Grand Slam doubles results
- Wimbledon: Q1 (2000)

Francisco Cabello (born 6 December 1972) is a former professional tennis player from Argentina.

== Career ==
Cabello was ranked 465 in the world when he made his ATP debut at the 1997 Estoril Open, but managed to defeat third seed Wayne Ferreira. He came from 0–3 down in the third and deciding set, to defeat the South African, who was the world's 10th ranked player at the time.

He was a doubles quarter-finalist at Barcelona in 1999, with partner Francisco Costa. The pair of qualifiers had a win over top seeds and the previous year's finalists Ellis Ferreira and Rick Leach in the round of 16.

== Challenger titles ==
=== Singles: (1) ===
No.	Year	Tournament	Surface	Opponent	Score
1.	1998	Barletta, Italy	Clay	(Spain) Salvador Navarro	6–4, 6–4

=== Doubles: (2) ===
No.	Year	Tournament	Surface	Partner	Opponents	Score
1.	1998	Montevideo, Uruguay	Clay	(Argentina) Agustín Calleri	(Brazil) Paulo Taicher (Brazil) Cristiano Testa	6–4, 6–4
2.	1999	Aschaffenburg, Germany	Clay	(Germany) Michael Kohlmann	(Italy) Vincenzo Santopadre (Brazil) Cristiano Testa	1–6, 6–3, 6–4
