= 1999 US Open – Women's doubles qualifying =

Women's doubles qualifying
- 1999 US Open

Events
Singles	men	women		boys	girls
Doubles	men	women	mixed	boys	girls
WC Singles	men	women	quad
WC Doubles	men	women	quad
Legends	men	women	mixed

Qualification
Singles	men	women
Doubles	men	women
- US Open

== Seeds ==
1. (Russia) Eugenia Kulikovskaya / (Federal Republic of Yugoslavia) Sandra Načuk (first round)
2. (Croatia) Jelena Kostanić / (Belarus) Tatiana Poutchek (Qualifiers)
3. (United States) Sandra Cacic / (Canada) Maureen Drake (Qualifiers)
4. (Spain) Rosa María Andrés Rodríguez / (Spain) Mariam Ramon Climent (first round)
5. (Hungary) Rita Kuti-Kis / (Germany) Marlene Weingärtner (first round)
6. (United States) Lindsay Lee / (Canada) Vanessa Webb (Qualifiers)
7. (Germany) Jana Kandarr / (United States) Samantha Reeves (qualifying competition)
8. (Romania) Magda Mihalache / (Australia) Bryanne Stewart (first round)

== Qualifiers ==
1. (United States) Lindsay Lee / (Canada) Vanessa Webb
2. (Croatia) Jelena Kostanić / (Belarus) Tatiana Poutchek
3. (United States) Sandra Cacic / (Canada) Maureen Drake
4. (Bulgaria) Svetlana Krivencheva / (Croatia) Maja Murić

== Draw ==
Key

- Q = Qualifier
- WC = Wild card
- LL = Lucky loser
- Alt = Alternate
- ITF = ITF entry
- PR = Protected ranking
- SR = Special ranking
- SE = Special exempt
- JE = Junior exempt
- JR = Junior Accelerator Programme entrant
- CO = College Accelerator Programme entrant
- NG = Next Gen Accelerator Program entrant
- w/o = Walkover
- r = Retired
- d = Defaulted

=== First qualifier ===
First round
1	(Russia) Eugenia Kulikovskaya (Federal Republic of Yugoslavia) Sandra Načuk	6^{4}	4
(Italy) Alice Canepa (Austria) Barbara Schwartz	7^{7}	6
WC	(United States) Julie Ditty (United States) Jennifer Russell	6^{9}	4
6	(United States) Lindsay Lee (Canada) Vanessa Webb	7^{11}	6

Qualifying competition
(Italy) Alice Canepa (Austria) Barbara Schwartz	6	3	6^{3}
6	(United States) Lindsay Lee (Canada) Vanessa Webb	4	6	7^{7}

=== Second qualifier ===
First round
2	(Croatia) Jelena Kostanić (Belarus) Tatiana Poutchek	7	6
WC	(United States) Holly Parkinson (United States) Tracy Singian	5	1
WC	(United States) Marissa Irvin (United States) Julie Scott	1	7	4
7	(Germany) Jana Kandarr (United States) Samantha Reeves	6	5	6

Qualifying competition
2	(Croatia) Jelena Kostanić (Belarus) Tatiana Poutchek	6	6
7	(Germany) Jana Kandarr (United States) Samantha Reeves	3	4

=== Third qualifier ===
First round
3	(United States) Sandra Cacic (Canada) Maureen Drake	6	6
(Australia) Amanda Grahame (Australia) Trudi Musgrave	3	2
(United States) Melissa Mazzotta (Romania) Andreea Vanc	6^{6}	6	7
5	(Hungary) Rita Kuti-Kis (Germany) Marlene Weingärtner	7^{8}	2	5

Qualifying competition
3	(United States) Sandra Cacic (Canada) Maureen Drake	6	6^{3}	7
(United States) Melissa Mazzotta (Romania) Andreea Vanc	1	7^{7}	5

=== Fourth qualifier ===
First round
4	(Spain) Rosa María Andrés Rodríguez (Spain) Mariam Ramon Climent	4	3
(Belarus) Olga Barabanschikova (Switzerland) Emmanuelle Gagliardi	6	6
(Bulgaria) Svetlana Krivencheva (Croatia) Maja Murić	6	6
8	(Romania) Magda Mihalache (Australia) Bryanne Stewart	4	3

Qualifying competition
(Belarus) Olga Barabanschikova (Switzerland) Emmanuelle Gagliardi	6	6^{8}	3
(Bulgaria) Svetlana Krivencheva (Croatia) Maja Murić	1	7^{10}	6
