= 1999 US Open – Men's doubles qualifying =

Men's doubles qualifying
- 1999 US Open

Events
| Singles | men | women | | boys | girls |
| Doubles | men | women | mixed | boys | girls |
| WC Singles | men | women | quad |
| WC Doubles | men | women | quad |
| Legends | men | women | mixed |

Qualification
| Singles | men | women |
| Doubles | men | women |
- US Open

== Seeds ==
1. (New Zealand) James Greenhalgh / (Australia) Grant Silcock (qualifying competition)
2. (South Africa) Paul Rosner / (Federal Republic of Yugoslavia) Dušan Vemić (first round)
3. (Australia) Andrew Painter / (South Africa) Byron Talbot (qualifying competition)
4. (Czech Republic) Ota Fukárek / (Mexico) Alejandro Hernández (qualifying competition)
5. (Venezuela) Maurice Ruah / (Brazil) André Sá (Qualifiers)
6. (Australia) Ben Ellwood / (Australia) Michael Tebbutt (Qualifiers)
7. (Netherlands) Sander Groen / (Romania) Gabriel Trifu (first round)
8. (Japan) Thomas Shimada / (South Africa) Myles Wakefield (Qualifiers)

== Qualifiers ==
1. (Japan) Thomas Shimada / (South Africa) Myles Wakefield
2. (United States) Mitch Sprengelmeyer / (South Africa) Jason Weir-Smith
3. (Australia) Ben Ellwood / (Australia) Michael Tebbutt
4. (Venezuela) Maurice Ruah / (Brazil) André Sá

== Draw ==
Key

- Q = Qualifier
- WC = Wild card
- LL = Lucky loser
- Alt = Alternate
- ITF = ITF entry
- PR = Protected ranking
- SR = Special ranking
- SE = Special exempt
- JE = Junior exempt
- JR = Junior Accelerator Programme entrant
- CO = College Accelerator Programme entrant
- NG = Next Gen Accelerator Program entrant
- w/o = Walkover
- r = Retired
- d = Defaulted

=== First qualifier ===
First round
1 | (New Zealand) James Greenhalgh (Australia) Grant Silcock | 6 | 6
(Czech Republic) Petr Dezort (Czech Republic) Radomír Vašek | 3 | 2
(Portugal) João Cunha e Silva (Netherlands) Edwin Kempes | 3 | 3
8 | (Japan) Thomas Shimada (South Africa) Myles Wakefield | 6 | 6

Qualifying competition
1 | (New Zealand) James Greenhalgh (Australia) Grant Silcock | 6 | 6
8 | (Japan) Thomas Shimada (South Africa) Myles Wakefield | 7 | 7

=== Second qualifier ===
First round
2 | (South Africa) Paul Rosner (Federal Republic of Yugoslavia) Dušan Vemić | 7 | 3 | 6
(United States) Mitch Sprengelmeyer (South Africa) Jason Weir-Smith | 6 | 6 | 7
(United Kingdom) Barry Cowan (South Africa) Wesley Whitehouse | 6 | 6
7 | (Netherlands) Sander Groen (Romania) Gabriel Trifu | 3 | 4

Qualifying competition
(United States) Mitch Sprengelmeyer (South Africa) Jason Weir-Smith | 6 | 7
(United Kingdom) Barry Cowan (South Africa) Wesley Whitehouse | 2 | 6

=== Third qualifier ===
First round
3 | (Australia) Andrew Painter (South Africa) Byron Talbot | 6 | 6 | 6
WC | (United States) Scott Eddins (United States) Nathan Zeder | 7 | 1 | 4
(Israel) Noam Behr (Israel) Harel Levy | 3 | 4
6 | (Australia) Ben Ellwood (Australia) Michael Tebbutt | 6 | 6

Qualifying competition
3 | (Australia) Andrew Painter (South Africa) Byron Talbot | 4 | 1
6 | (Australia) Ben Ellwood (Australia) Michael Tebbutt | 6 | 6

=== Fourth qualifier ===
First round
4 | (Czech Republic) Ota Fukárek (Mexico) Alejandro Hernández | 6 | 6
WC | (United States) Brandon Hawk (United States) Doug Root | 2 | 4
WC | (Lebanon) Ali Hamadeh (United States) Michael Joyce | 1 | 4
5 | (Venezuela) Maurice Ruah (Brazil) André Sá | 6 | 6

Qualifying competition
4 | (Czech Republic) Ota Fukárek (Mexico) Alejandro Hernández | 6 | 7 | 5
5 | (Venezuela) Maurice Ruah (Brazil) André Sá | 7 | 6 | 7
