= 1998 Grand Prix Hassan II =

- Date: 23–30 March
- Edition: 14th
- Category: World Series
- Draw: 32S / 16D
- Prize money: $210,000
- Surface: Clay / outdoor
- Location: Casablanca, Morocco

Champions

Singles
- (Italy) Andrea Gaudenzi

Doubles
- (Italy) Andrea Gaudenzi / (Italy) Diego Nargiso
- Grand Prix Hassan II

The 1998 Grand Prix Hassan II was an Association of Tennis Professionals men's tennis tournament played on outdoor clay courts in Casablanca, Morocco. It was the 14th edition of the tournament and was held from 23 March until 30 March 1998. Fourth-seeded Andrea Gaudenzi won the singles title.

== Finals ==
=== Singles ===
(Italy) Andrea Gaudenzi defeated (Spain) Álex Calatrava 6–4, 5–7, 6–4

- It was Gaudenzi's 2nd title of the year and the 3rd of his career.

=== Doubles ===
(Italy) Andrea Gaudenzi / (Italy) Diego Nargiso defeated (Italy) Cristian Brandi / (Italy) Filippo Messori 6–4, 7–6

- It was Gaudenzi's 1st title of the year and the 2nd of his career. It was Nargiso's only title of the year and the 4th of his career.
