= 2011 US Open – Women's singles qualifying =

Women's singles qualifying
- 2011 US Open

Events
Singles	men	women		boys	girls
Doubles	men	women	mixed	boys	girls
WC Singles	men	women	quad
WC Doubles	men	women	quad
Legends	men	women	mixed
← 2010 ·	US Open	· 2012 →

== Seeds ==
1. (Kazakhstan) Galina Voskoboeva (qualified)
2. (New Zealand) Marina Erakovic (qualified)
3. (Canada) Stéphanie Dubois (qualifying competition)
4. (Romania) Edina Gallovits-Hall (qualifying competition)
5. (France) Iryna Brémond (first round)
6. (Czech Republic) Andrea Hlaváčková (qualifying competition)
7. (France) Stéphanie Foretz Gacon (qualified)
8. (Poland) Urszula Radwańska (qualified)
9. (Italy) Maria Elena Camerin (first round)
10. (Slovakia) Zuzana Kučová (first round)
11. (Spain) Arantxa Parra Santonja (first round)
12. (Czech Republic) Eva Birnerová (second round)
13. (Chinese Taipei) Chan Yung-jan (qualified)
14. (Luxembourg) Mandy Minella (qualifying competition)
15. (Czech Republic) Renata Voráčová (first round)
16. (Austria) Yvonne Meusburger (first round)
17. (Italy) Romina Oprandi (qualified)
18. (Canada) Aleksandra Wozniak (qualified)
19. (Germany) Kathrin Wörle (second round)
20. (Ukraine) Lesia Tsurenko (first round)
21. (Russia) Valeria Savinykh (second round)
22. (Chinese Taipei) Chang Kai-chen (second round)
23. (France) Caroline Garcia (first round)
24. (Russia) Vitalia Diatchenko (qualified)
25. (Spain) Silvia Soler-Espinosa (qualified)
26. (Ukraine) Mariya Koryttseva (second round)
27. (United States) Alexa Glatch (first round)
28. (Japan) Erika Sema (first round)
29. (Belgium) Kirsten Flipkens (first round)
30. (Ukraine) Tetiana Luzhanska (second round)
31. (Romania) Alexandra Cadanţu (first round)
32. (Ukraine) Olga Savchuk (second round)

== Qualifiers ==
1. (Kazakhstan) Galina Voskoboeva
2. (New Zealand) Marina Erakovic
3. (Spain) Silvia Soler-Espinosa
4. (Italy) Romina Oprandi
5. (Hungary) Réka-Luca Jani
6. (Russia) Alexandra Panova
7. (France) Stéphanie Foretz Gacon
8. (Poland) Urszula Radwańska
9. (Netherlands) Michaëlla Krajicek
10. (Thailand) Noppawan Lertcheewakarn
11. (United Kingdom) Laura Robson
12. (Russia) Vitalia Diatchenko
13. (Chinese Taipei) Chan Yung-jan
14. (Russia) Ekaterina Bychkova
15. (Italy) Karin Knapp
16. (Canada) Aleksandra Wozniak

== Qualifying draw ==
=== Key ===
- Q = Qualifier
- WC = Wild card
- LL = Lucky loser
- Alt = Alternate
- ITF = ITF entry
- PR = Protected ranking
- SR = Special ranking
- SE = Special exempt
- JE = Junior exempt
- JR = Junior Accelerator Programme entrant
- CO = College Accelerator Programme entrant
- NG = Next Gen Accelerator Program entrant
- w/o = Walkover
- r = Retired
- d = Defaulted

=== First qualifier ===
First round
1	(Kazakhstan) Galina Voskoboeva	7^{7}	6
(Bolivia) María Fernanda Álvarez Terán	6^{1}	1
(France) Claire Feuerstein	7^{8}	6
(Brazil) Ana-Clara Duarte	6^{6}	4
(Russia) Nina Bratchikova	6	6
(Spain) Lara Arruabarrena-Vecino	3	1
(Ukraine) Yuliya Beygelzimer	6	6
29	(Belgium) Kirsten Flipkens	4	2

Second round
1	(Kazakhstan) Galina Voskoboeva	3	6	6
(France) Claire Feuerstein	6	1	2
(Russia) Nina Bratchikova	6	6
(Ukraine) Yuliya Beygelzimer	1	2

Qualifying competition
1	(Kazakhstan) Galina Voskoboeva	6	6
(Russia) Nina Bratchikova	2	2

=== Second qualifier ===
First round
2	(New Zealand) Marina Erakovic	6	6
(Japan) Yurika Sema	3	1
(Australia) Olivia Rogowska	6^{3}	5
(Slovenia) Petra Rampre	7^{7}	7
(United States) Lauren Albanese	6	5	3
(Romania) Mihaela Buzărnescu	4	7	6
(China) Han Xinyun	3	6^{6}
19	(Germany) Kathrin Wörle	6	7^{8}

Second round
2	(New Zealand) Marina Erakovic	6	6
(Slovenia) Petra Rampre	1	2
(Romania) Mihaela Buzărnescu	6	4	6
19	(Germany) Kathrin Wörle	2	6	0

Qualifying competition
2	(New Zealand) Marina Erakovic	6	7
(Romania) Mihaela Buzărnescu	3	5

=== Third qualifier ===
First round
3	(Canada) Stéphanie Dubois	6	6
(United States) Gail Brodsky	0	0
(United States) Madison Brengle	1	6	3
(Germany) Tatjana Malek	6	1	6
WC	(United States) Julia Boserup	3	4
(Bulgaria) Elitsa Kostova	6	6
(Australia) Sally Peers	4	4
25	(Spain) Silvia Soler-Espinosa	6	6

Second round
3	(Canada) Stéphanie Dubois	6^{1}	6	6
(Germany) Tatjana Malek	7^{7}	3	1
(Bulgaria) Elitsa Kostova	4	5
25	(Spain) Silvia Soler-Espinosa	6	7

Qualifying competition
3	(Canada) Stéphanie Dubois	2	2
25	(Spain) Silvia Soler-Espinosa	6	6

=== Fourth qualifier ===
First round
4	(Romania) Edina Gallovits-Hall	6	6
(Australia) Isabella Holland	1	0
WC	(United States) Jessica Pegula	6	7^{7}
(Netherlands) Kiki Bertens	3	6^{1}
(Japan) Kurumi Nara	6	6
WC	(Russia) Daria Gavrilova	2	4
(United States) Julia Cohen	1	4
17	(Italy) Romina Oprandi	6	6

Second round
4	(Romania) Edina Gallovits-Hall	6	6
WC	(United States) Jessica Pegula	4	4
(Japan) Kurumi Nara	6^{5}	6	0
17	(Italy) Romina Oprandi	7^{7}	3	6

Qualifying competition
4	(Romania) Edina Gallovits-Hall	3	2
17	(Italy) Romina Oprandi	6	6

=== Fifth qualifier ===
First round
5	(France) Iryna Brémond	3	6	2
(Hungary) Réka-Luca Jani	6	3	6
(Italy) Giulia Gatto-Monticone	7	4	2
(Italy) Camila Giorgi	5	6	6
(Georgia (country)) Margalita Chakhnashvili	7^{7}	3	1
(China) Lu Jingjing	6^{5}	6	6
(New Zealand) Sacha Jones	6	6
27	(United States) Alexa Glatch	3	0

Second round
(Hungary) Réka-Luca Jani	7	6
(Italy) Camila Giorgi	5	1
(China) Lu Jingjing	6^{2}	6	6
(New Zealand) Sacha Jones	7^{7}	4	4

Qualifying competition
(Hungary) Réka-Luca Jani	7^{7}	4	6
(China) Lu Jingjing	6^{5}	6	3

=== Sixth qualifier ===
First round
6	(Czech Republic) Andrea Hlaváčková	5	6	6
(China) Wang Qiang	7	4	1
WC	(United States) Krista Hardebeck	0	2
(United States) Chichi Scholl	6	6
(Russia) Alexandra Panova	6	6
WC	(United States) Anne-Liz Jeuking-Nkamgouo	2	2
(Luxembourg) Anne Kremer	3	5
32	(Ukraine) Olga Savchuk	6	7

Second round
6	(Czech Republic) Andrea Hlaváčková	7^{8}	4	6
(United States) Chichi Scholl	6^{6}	6	1
(Russia) Alexandra Panova	7	6
32	(Ukraine) Olga Savchuk	5	3

Qualifying competition
6	(Czech Republic) Andrea Hlaváčková	6	2	6^{7}
(Russia) Alexandra Panova	3	6	7^{9}

=== Seventh qualifier ===
First round
7	(France) Stéphanie Foretz Gacon	7	7
(Hungary) Tímea Babos	5	5
(Slovakia) Kristína Kučová	6	6
(Argentina) Florencia Molinero	4	1
WC	(United States) Robin Anderson	6^{2}	5
(United Kingdom) Naomi Broady	7^{7}	7
(France) Laura Thorpe	3	2
22	(Chinese Taipei) Chang Kai-chen	6	6

Second round
7	(France) Stéphanie Foretz Gacon	6	5	7
(Slovakia) Kristína Kučová	3	7	5
(United Kingdom) Naomi Broady	6	5	6
22	(Chinese Taipei) Chang Kai-chen	4	7	3

Qualifying competition
7	(France) Stéphanie Foretz Gacon	6	6^{6}	6
(United Kingdom) Naomi Broady	3	7^{8}	3

=== Eighth qualifier ===
First round
8	(Poland) Urszula Radwańska	6	6
(Germany) Anna-Lena Grönefeld	3	2
(Greece) Eirini Georgatou	6	4	6
(Slovenia) Nastja Kolar	4	6	4
(Japan) Rika Fujiwara	6	6
(Spain) Leticia Costas-Moreira	1	4
(Poland) Magda Linette	7^{7}	4	2
21	(Russia) Valeria Savinykh	6^{2}	6	6

Second round
8	(Poland) Urszula Radwańska	6	6
(Greece) Eirini Georgatou	3	1
(Japan) Rika Fujiwara	6	2	6
21	(Russia) Valeria Savinykh	1	6	2

Qualifying competition
8	(Poland) Urszula Radwańska	6	6
(Japan) Rika Fujiwara	4	3

=== Ninth qualifier ===
First round
9	(Italy) Maria Elena Camerin	3	7^{7}	2
(Netherlands) Michaëlla Krajicek	6	6^{3}	6
(Croatia) Ani Mijačika	6	3	1
(France) Kristina Mladenovic	3	6	6
WC	(United States) Nicole Gibbs	6	6^{4}	0
(Hungary) Melinda Czink	3	7^{7}	6
PR	(Hungary) Katalin Marosi	6	0	3
26	(Ukraine) Mariya Koryttseva	4	6	6

Second round
(Netherlands) Michaëlla Krajicek	7	6
(France) Kristina Mladenovic	5	1
(Hungary) Melinda Czink	2	6	6
26	(Ukraine) Mariya Koryttseva	6	3	4

Qualifying competition
(Netherlands) Michaëlla Krajicek	3	6	7
(Hungary) Melinda Czink	6	0	5

=== Tenth qualifier ===
First round
10	(Slovakia) Zuzana Kučová	4	7	3
(Thailand) Noppawan Lertcheewakarn	6	5	6
(Romania) Liana Ungur	6	6^{7}	2
(United States) Ashley Weinhold	3	7^{9}	6
(Czech Republic) Kristýna Plíšková	6	6
(Spain) Beatriz García Vidagany	3	4
(Canada) Sharon Fichman	6	6
28	(Japan) Erika Sema	4	0

Second round
(Thailand) Noppawan Lertcheewakarn	7^{8}	7^{7}
(United States) Ashley Weinhold	6^{6}	6^{4}
(Czech Republic) Kristýna Plíšková	6	6
(Canada) Sharon Fichman	2	1

Qualifying competition
(Thailand) Noppawan Lertcheewakarn	7	3	6
(Czech Republic) Kristýna Plíšková	5	6	3

=== Eleventh qualifier ===
First round
11	(Spain) Arantxa Parra Santonja	6^{2}	3
WC	(United States) Taylor Townsend	7^{7}	6
(Canada) Heidi El Tabakh	1	3
(United Kingdom) Laura Robson	6	6
(Hong Kong) Zhang Ling	4	6	7^{7}
(Spain) Estrella Cabeza Candela	6	4	6^{4}
(Bulgaria) Dia Evtimova	4	6	7
31	(Romania) Alexandra Cadanţu	6	3	5

Second round
WC	(United States) Taylor Townsend	3	6	6^{0}
(United Kingdom) Laura Robson	6	4	7^{7}
(Hong Kong) Zhang Ling	6	6
(Bulgaria) Dia Evtimova	3	2

Qualifying competition
(United Kingdom) Laura Robson	6	6
(Hong Kong) Zhang Ling	4	3

=== Twelfth qualifier ===
First round
12	(Czech Republic) Eva Birnerová	7^{7}	6
(Italy) Corinna Dentoni	6^{4}	0
(Poland) Marta Domachowska	6	6
(Japan) Kumiko Iijima	4	2
(Kazakhstan) Sesil Karatantcheva	2	6	6
(Japan) Junri Namigata	6	4	4
(Germany) Laura Siegemund	3	5
24	(Russia) Vitalia Diatchenko	6	7

Second round
12	(Czech Republic) Eva Birnerová	4	2
(Poland) Marta Domachowska	6	6
(Kazakhstan) Sesil Karatantcheva	5	2
24	(Russia) Vitalia Diatchenko	7	6

Qualifying competition
(Poland) Marta Domachowska	6	2	4
24	(Russia) Vitalia Diatchenko	4	6	6

=== Thirteenth qualifier ===
First round
13	(Chinese Taipei) Chan Yung-jan	6	6
(Russia) Ekaterina Ivanova	1	4
(Russia) Arina Rodionova	2	6	2
(Slovakia) Lenka Juríková	6	3	6
(Kazakhstan) Zarina Diyas	7	6
(France) Anaïs Laurendon	5	1
(Russia) Regina Kulikova	2	6	6
23	(France) Caroline Garcia	6	4	2

Second round
13	(Chinese Taipei) Chan Yung-jan	6	6
(Slovakia) Lenka Juríková	1	0
(Kazakhstan) Zarina Diyas	0	3
(Russia) Regina Kulikova	6	6

Qualifying competition
13	(Chinese Taipei) Chan Yung-jan	4	7^{7}	6
(Russia) Regina Kulikova	6	6^{3}	2

=== Fourteenth qualifier ===
First round
14	(Luxembourg) Mandy Minella	6	6
(Czech Republic) Karolína Plíšková	1	3
(Turkey) Çağla Büyükakçay	6	7
(Romania) Mădălina Gojnea	0	5
(Russia) Ekaterina Bychkova	7^{7}	7^{7}
(Kazakhstan) Yaroslava Shvedova	6^{5}	6^{3}
(Japan) Sachie Ishizu	7^{7}	5	2
30	(Ukraine) Tetiana Luzhanska	6^{4}	7	6

Second round
14	(Luxembourg) Mandy Minella	6	4	7^{7}
(Turkey) Çağla Büyükakçay	0	6	6^{5}
(Russia) Ekaterina Bychkova	6	6
30	(Ukraine) Tetiana Luzhanska	3	4

Qualifying competition
14	(Luxembourg) Mandy Minella	5	7^{7}	3
(Russia) Ekaterina Bychkova	7	6^{5}	6

=== Fifteenth qualifier ===
First round
15	(Czech Republic) Renata Voráčová	7	4	5
(Serbia) Aleksandra Krunić	5	6	7
(Romania) Elena Bogdan	6	3	2
(Italy) Karin Knapp	1	6	6
(Italy) Anna Floris	6	4	6
(France) Alizé Lim	3	6	1
(Portugal) Michelle Larcher de Brito	7^{7}	4	7^{7}
20	(Ukraine) Lesia Tsurenko	6^{4}	6	6^{3}

Second round
(Serbia) Aleksandra Krunić	0	5
(Italy) Karin Knapp	6	7
(Italy) Anna Floris	2	0
(Portugal) Michelle Larcher de Brito	6	6

Qualifying competition
(Italy) Karin Knapp	4	6	7^{7}
(Portugal) Michelle Larcher de Brito	6	2	6^{1}

=== Sixteenth qualifier ===
First round
16	(Austria) Yvonne Meusburger	4	4
(Croatia) Ajla Tomljanović	6	6
WC	(Australia) Ashleigh Barty	4	4
(Israel) Julia Glushko	6	6
(Switzerland) Stefanie Vögele	6	6
(Slovakia) Lenka Wienerová	3	0
Alt	(Portugal) Maria João Koehler	4	6	3
18	(Canada) Aleksandra Wozniak	6	4	6

Second round
(Croatia) Ajla Tomljanović	3	6^{4}
(Israel) Julia Glushko	6	7^{7}
(Switzerland) Stefanie Vögele	4	7	2
18	(Canada) Aleksandra Wozniak	6	5	6

Qualifying competition
(Israel) Julia Glushko	1	4
18	(Canada) Aleksandra Wozniak	6	6
