= 2000 Wimbledon Championships – Women's singles qualifying =

Women's singles qualifying
- 2000 Wimbledon Championships

Events
Singles	men	women		boys	girls
Doubles	men	women	mixed	boys	girls
WC Singles	men	women	quad
WC Doubles	men	women	quad
Legends	men	women	seniors

Qualification
Singles	men	women
Doubles	men	women
- Wimbledon Championships

Players and pairs who neither have high enough rankings nor receive wild cards may participate in a qualifying tournament held one week before the annual Wimbledon Tennis Championships.

== Seeds ==
1. (Spain) Marta Marrero (second round)
2. (Poland) Magdalena Grzybowska (qualified)
3. (Paraguay) Rossana de los Ríos (qualified)
4. (Italy) Giulia Casoni (qualified)
5. (Russia) Lina Krasnoroutskaya (qualified)
6. (Italy) Francesca Schiavone (first round)
7. (Japan) Shinobu Asagoe (qualified)
8. (United States) Jennifer Hopkins (second round)
9. (Canada) Vanessa Webb (qualifying competition)
10. (Uzbekistan) Iroda Tulyaganova (first round)
11. (Belarus) Tatiana Poutchek (second round)
12. (Bulgaria) Pavlina Nola (qualifying competition)
13. (Chinese Taipei) Janet Lee (second round)
14. (United States) Meilen Tu (qualifying competition)
15. (United States) Brie Rippner (qualified)
16. (Hungary) Anna Földényi (second round)
17. (France) Émilie Loit (second round)
18. (Australia) Annabel Ellwood (first round)
19. (United States) Mashona Washington (qualified)
20. (Slovakia) Martina Suchá (qualifying competition)
21. (Japan) Yuka Yoshida (qualified)
22. (Australia) Rachel McQuillan (qualifying competition)
23. (Denmark) Eva Dyrberg (second round)
24. (Czech Republic) Lenka Němečková (first round)

== Qualifiers ==
1. (Japan) Yuka Yoshida
2. (Poland) Magdalena Grzybowska
3. (Paraguay) Rossana de los Ríos
4. (Italy) Giulia Casoni
5. (Russia) Lina Krasnoroutskaya
6. (Germany) Gréta Arn
7. (Japan) Shinobu Asagoe
8. (Netherlands) Yvette Basting
9. (Czech Republic) Dája Bedáňová
10. (Austria) Melanie Schnell
11. (United States) Mashona Washington
12. (United States) Brie Rippner

== Qualifying draw ==
=== First qualifier ===
First round
1	(Spain) Marta Marrero	6^{7}	6	6
WC	(United Kingdom) Victoria Davies	7^{9}	4	3
(Australia) Lisa McShea	6	6
(Italy) Alice Canepa	3	2
WC	(United Kingdom) Anne Keothavong	7	6
(Czech Republic) Eva Martincová	5	3
(United States) Linda Wild	6	3	4
21	(Japan) Yuka Yoshida	2	6	6

Second round
1	(Spain) Marta Marrero	7	6^{4}	3
(Australia) Lisa McShea	5	7^{7}	6
WC	(United Kingdom) Anne Keothavong	2	2
21	(Japan) Yuka Yoshida	6	6

Qualifying competition
(Australia) Lisa McShea	6	6^{3}	4
21	(Japan) Yuka Yoshida	1	7^{7}	6

=== Second qualifier ===
First round
2	(Poland) Magdalena Grzybowska	6	6
(Hungary) Kira Nagy	3	2
(Czech Republic) Libuše Průšová	1	7	7
(Indonesia) Wynne Prakusya	6	5	5
(Canada) Renata Kolbovic	6	7^{7}
(Slovenia) Tina Hergold	3	6^{5}
(Israel) Hila Rosen	3	4
14	(United States) Meilen Tu	6	6

Second round
2	(Poland) Magdalena Grzybowska	6	6
(Czech Republic) Libuše Průšová	4	2
(Canada) Renata Kolbovic	6	2	3
14	(United States) Meilen Tu	2	6	6

Qualifying competition
2	(Poland) Magdalena Grzybowska	6	2	9
14	(United States) Meilen Tu	4	6	7

=== Third qualifier ===
First round
3	(Paraguay) Rossana de los Ríos	3	6	6
(France) Laurence Andretto	6	2	3
(France) Sophie Erre	6	7
(United States) Jill Craybas	4	5
(Slovakia) Daniela Hantuchová	6	6
(Russia) Elena Bovina	1	2
(Italy) Francesca Lubiani	1	7^{7}	1
22	(Australia) Rachel McQuillan	6	6^{4}	6

Second round
3	(Paraguay) Rossana de los Ríos	7^{7}	0
(France) Sophie Erre	6^{2}	0^{r}
(Slovakia) Daniela Hantuchová	2	6	4
22	(Australia) Rachel McQuillan	6	2	6

Qualifying competition
3	(Paraguay) Rossana de los Ríos	6	4	8
22	(Australia) Rachel McQuillan	1	6	6

=== Fourth qualifier ===
First round
4	(Italy) Giulia Casoni	6	7^{7}
(Austria) Marion Maruska	3	6^{3}
(United States) Tracy Almeda-Singian	4	4
(Venezuela) Milagros Sequera	6	6
(United States) Samantha Reeves	2	6	6
(Germany) Adriana Barna	6	4	2
PR	(Hungary) Virág Csurgó	4	6^{4}
13	(Chinese Taipei) Janet Lee	6	7^{7}

Second round
4	(Italy) Giulia Casoni	6	6
(Venezuela) Milagros Sequera	3	2
(United States) Samantha Reeves	6	6
13	(Chinese Taipei) Janet Lee	2	4

Qualifying competition
4	(Italy) Giulia Casoni	6	6
(United States) Samantha Reeves	4	2

=== Fifth qualifier ===
First round
5	(Russia) Lina Krasnoroutskaya	6	6
(Czech Republic) Michaela Paštiková	2	2
(Australia) Trudi Musgrave	6	1	2
(Australia) Amanda Grahame	4	6	6
PR	(San Marino) Ludmilla Varmuza	2	2
WC	(United Kingdom) Katherine Vymetal	6	6
(Bulgaria) Desislava Topalova	1	2
20	(Slovakia) Martina Suchá	6	6

Second round
5	(Russia) Lina Krasnoroutskaya	6	6
(Australia) Amanda Grahame	4	2
WC	(United Kingdom) Katherine Vymetal	0	1
20	(Slovakia) Martina Suchá	6	6

Qualifying competition
5	(Russia) Lina Krasnoroutskaya	6	7
20	(Slovakia) Martina Suchá	3	5

=== Sixth qualifier ===
First round
6	(Italy) Francesca Schiavone	6^{2}	1
(Germany) Gréta Arn	7^{7}	6
WC	(United Kingdom) Abigail Tordoff	7	6
(Italy) Germana Di Natale	5	2
WC	(United Kingdom) Heidi Farr	1	7^{7}	2
(Germany) Angelika Bachmann	6	6^{5}	6
(Switzerland) Marie-Gaïané Mikaelian	6	3	1
23	(Denmark) Eva Dyrberg	4	6	6

Second round
(Germany) Gréta Arn	6	6
WC	(United Kingdom) Abigail Tordoff	1	2
(Germany) Angelika Bachmann	6	7^{8}
23	(Denmark) Eva Dyrberg	0	6^{6}

Qualifying competition
(Germany) Gréta Arn	2	7^{7}	6
(Germany) Angelika Bachmann	6	6^{1}	2

=== Seventh qualifier ===
First round
7	(Japan) Shinobu Asagoe	6	6
(Austria) Sybille Bammer	0	3
(Italy) Laura Dell'Angelo	4	1
(France) Stéphanie Foretz	6	6
(Germany) Bianka Lamade	6	7^{7}
(Poland) Anna Bieleń-Żarska	4	6^{0}
(Slovenia) Petra Rampre	6^{4}	3
17	(France) Émilie Loit	7^{7}	6

Second round
7	(Japan) Shinobu Asagoe	6	2	6
(France) Stéphanie Foretz	2	6	4
(Germany) Bianka Lamade	6	6
17	(France) Émilie Loit	1	4

Qualifying competition
7	(Japan) Shinobu Asagoe	6	6
(Germany) Bianka Lamade	2	2

=== Eighth qualifier ===
First round
8	(United States) Jennifer Hopkins	6	6
(Kazakhstan) Irina Selyutina	4	3
(United States) Wendy Fix	2	6	6
(Slovenia) Tina Križan	6	2	8
(South Africa) Surina de Beer	3	2
(France) Alexandra Fusai	6	6
(Netherlands) Yvette Basting	6	6
18	(Australia) Annabel Ellwood	4	3

Second round
8	(United States) Jennifer Hopkins	6^{3}	1
(Slovenia) Tina Križan	7^{7}	6
(France) Alexandra Fusai	3	1
(Netherlands) Yvette Basting	6	6

Qualifying competition
(Slovenia) Tina Križan	4	4
(Netherlands) Yvette Basting	6	6

=== Ninth qualifier ===
First round
9	(Canada) Vanessa Webb	6	5	7
(India) Nirupama Vaidyanathan	2	7	5
(Japan) Nana Miyagi	2	1
(South Korea) Cho Yoon-jeong	6	6
(Slovakia) Janette Husárová	0	1
(Czech Republic) Dája Bedáňová	6	6
(Germany) Sabine Klaschka	3	6^{7}
16	(Hungary) Anna Földényi	6	7^{9}

Second round
9	(Canada) Vanessa Webb	5	7	6
(South Korea) Cho Yoon-jeong	7	5	3
(Czech Republic) Dája Bedáňová	6	6
16	(Hungary) Anna Földényi	3	2

Qualifying competition
9	(Canada) Vanessa Webb	6	4	4
(Czech Republic) Dája Bedáňová	3	6	6

=== Tenth qualifier ===
First round
10	(Uzbekistan) Iroda Tulyaganova	6	4	6
(Austria) Melanie Schnell	0	6	8
(Italy) Maria Paola Zavagli	6	4	4
(Spain) Gisela Riera	4	6	6
(Italy) Gloria Pizzichini	6	6
(Tunisia) Selima Sfar	0	2
(Australia) Evie Dominikovic	6^{10}	6	6
24	(Czech Republic) Lenka Němečková	7^{12}	2	1

Second round
(Austria) Melanie Schnell	6	6
(Spain) Gisela Riera	4	2
(Italy) Gloria Pizzichini	3	6	7
(Australia) Evie Dominikovic	6	2	5

Qualifying competition
(Austria) Melanie Schnell	3	6	7
(Italy) Gloria Pizzichini	6	2	5

=== Eleventh qualifier ===
First round
11	(Belarus) Tatiana Poutchek	6	6
(Belgium) Daphne van de Zande	4	4
(France) Sophie Georges	6	6
(Czech Republic) Eva Krejčová	2	3
WC	(United Kingdom) Jane O'Donoghue	3	6^{6}
WC	(United Kingdom) Alice Barnes	6	7^{8}
(Japan) Haruka Inoue	7	5	3
19	(United States) Mashona Washington	5	7	6

Second round
11	(Belarus) Tatiana Poutchek	6	3	0
(France) Sophie Georges	1	6	6
WC	(United Kingdom) Alice Barnes	2	1
19	(United States) Mashona Washington	6	6

Qualifying competition
(France) Sophie Georges	3	6	1
19	(United States) Mashona Washington	6	3	6

=== Twelfth qualifier ===
First round
12	(Bulgaria) Pavlina Nola	6	6
(United States) Jolene Watanabe	4	2
WC	(United Kingdom) Elena Baltacha	3	6	2
(Italy) Flavia Pennetta	6	4	6
(Germany) Anca Barna	5	3
(Australia) Bryanne Stewart	7	6
(Israel) Tzipora Obziler	3	3
15	(United States) Brie Rippner	6	6

Second round
12	(Bulgaria) Pavlina Nola	6	6
(Italy) Flavia Pennetta	1	1
(Australia) Bryanne Stewart	6^{5}	2
15	(United States) Brie Rippner	7^{7}	6

Qualifying competition
12	(Bulgaria) Pavlina Nola	6^{2}	6	4
15	(United States) Brie Rippner	7^{7}	2	6
