= 2000 Wimbledon Championships – Men's singles qualifying =

Men's singles qualifying
- 2000 Wimbledon Championships

Events
Singles	men	women		boys	girls
Doubles	men	women	mixed	boys	girls
WC Singles	men	women	quad
WC Doubles	men	women	quad
Legends	men	women	seniors

Qualification
Singles	men	women
Doubles	men	women
- Wimbledon Championships

Players and pairs who neither have high enough rankings nor receive wild cards may participate in a qualifying tournament held one week before the annual Wimbledon Tennis Championships.

== Seeds ==
1. (France) Antony Dupuis (second round)
2. (France) Stéphane Huet (qualified)
3. (Zimbabwe) Kevin Ullyett (first round)
4. (Argentina) Gastón Etlis (second round)
5. (Sweden) Fredrik Jonsson (qualifying competition, lucky loser)
6. (France) Cyril Saulnier (qualifying competition, lucky loser)
7. (Germany) David Prinosil (qualified)
8. (Australia) James Sekulov (first round)
9. (Canada) Sébastien Lareau (qualifying competition, lucky loser)
10. (Israel) Harel Levy (qualified)
11. (South Africa) Marcos Ondruska (second round)
12. (Zimbabwe) Wayne Black (qualifying competition, lucky loser)
13. (Italy) Stefano Pescosolido (first round)
14. (United States) Kevin Kim (first round)
15. (Italy) Cristiano Caratti (second round)
16. (Czech Republic) Petr Luxa (second round)
17. (Germany) Axel Pretzsch (first round)
18. (Finland) Tuomas Ketola (first round)
19. (Germany) Christian Vinck (qualified)
20. (Austria) Werner Eschauer (qualifying competition, lucky loser)
21. (France) Michaël Llodra (qualified)
22. (Australia) Dejan Petrovic (qualified)
23. (Spain) Óscar Burrieza (second round)
24. (Argentina) Sebastián Prieto (first round)
25. (Germany) Michael Kohlmann (qualifying competition, lucky loser)
26. (Mexico) Alejandro Hernández (second round)
27. (United States) Michael Russell (qualified)
28. (United States) Alex O'Brien (qualified)
29. (New Zealand) Mark Nielsen (first round)
30. (Argentina) Mariano Hood (second round)
31. (Romania) Răzvan Sabău (first round)
32. (The Bahamas) Mark Knowles (first round)

== Qualifiers ==
1. (Belarus) Vladimir Voltchkov
2. (France) Stéphane Huet
3. (Italy) Igor Gaudi
4. (Belgium) Olivier Rochus
5. (United States) Alex O'Brien
6. (United States) Michael Russell
7. (Germany) David Prinosil
8. (South Africa) Neville Godwin
9. (Australia) Paul Kilderry
10. (Israel) Harel Levy
11. (France) Michaël Llodra
12. (Australia) Dejan Petrovic
13. (Austria) Jürgen Melzer
14. (Germany) Christian Vinck
15. (South Africa) Justin Bower
16. (United States) Taylor Dent

== Lucky losers ==
1. (Sweden) Fredrik Jonsson
2. (France) Cyril Saulnier
3. (Canada) Sébastien Lareau
4. (Zimbabwe) Wayne Black
5. (Austria) Werner Eschauer
6. (Germany) Michael Kohlmann

== Qualifying draw ==
=== First qualifier ===
First round
1	(France) Antony Dupuis	7	6
(United States) Mike Bryan	5	2
(Japan) Satoshi Iwabuchi	4	6	3
(Belarus) Vladimir Voltchkov	6	3	6
(Czech Republic) David Miketa	6^{5}	6^{4}
(Germany) Björn Phau	7^{7}	7^{7}
(Austria) Julian Knowle	6	6
32	(The Bahamas) Mark Knowles	3	4

Second round
1	(France) Antony Dupuis	1	7^{7}	6
(Belarus) Vladimir Voltchkov	6	6^{2}	8
(Germany) Björn Phau	4	1
(Austria) Julian Knowle	6	6

Qualifying competition
(Belarus) Vladimir Voltchkov	6	3	6	4
(Austria) Julian Knowle	2	6	3	1^{r}

=== Second qualifier ===
First round
2	(France) Stéphane Huet	6^{7}	6	6
(South Africa) Louis Vosloo	7^{9}	3	4
(Argentina) Rodrigo Cerdera	1	3
(Finland) Ville Liukko	6	6
(Israel) Andy Ram	7^{7}	6
(Germany) Alexander Waske	6^{4}	4
(Argentina) Francisco Cabello	7^{8}	6
31	(Romania) Răzvan Sabău	6^{6}	4

Second round
2	(France) Stéphane Huet	6	6
(Finland) Ville Liukko	3	4
(Israel) Andy Ram	4	6	5
(Argentina) Francisco Cabello	6	3	7

Qualifying competition
2	(France) Stéphane Huet	6	6^{1}	2	6	6
(Argentina) Francisco Cabello	4	7^{7}	6	3	2

=== Third qualifier ===
First round
3	(Zimbabwe) Kevin Ullyett	3	7^{7}	3
(Italy) Vincenzo Santopadre	6	6^{4}	6
(South Africa) Jeff Coetzee	7	6
(Italy) Federico Luzzi	5	2
(Italy) Igor Gaudi	6	6
(Czech Republic) František Čermák	3	4
WC	(Federal Republic of Yugoslavia) Nenad Zimonjić	5	3
30	(Argentina) Mariano Hood	7	6

Second round
(Italy) Vincenzo Santopadre	2	7	6
(South Africa) Jeff Coetzee	6	5	1
(Italy) Igor Gaudi	7^{8}	6
30	(Argentina) Mariano Hood	6^{6}	2

Qualifying competition
(Italy) Vincenzo Santopadre	6	6^{5}	6^{7}	6	3
(Italy) Igor Gaudi	4	7^{7}	7^{9}	2	6

=== Fourth qualifier ===
First round
4	(Argentina) Gastón Etlis	6	6
(Israel) Lior Dahan	4	4
(Norway) Jan Frode Andersen	3	6	2
(Belgium) Réginald Willems	6	3	6
(Argentina) Cristian Kordasz	6^{3}	3
(France) Lionel Roux	7^{7}	6
(Belgium) Olivier Rochus	3	7^{7}	6
29	(New Zealand) Mark Nielsen	6	6^{3}	2

Second round
4	(Argentina) Gastón Etlis	4	6^{7}
(Belgium) Réginald Willems	6	7^{9}
(France) Lionel Roux	6	1	3
(Belgium) Olivier Rochus	4	6	6

Qualifying competition
(Belgium) Réginald Willems	4	6	2	6	2
(Belgium) Olivier Rochus	6	1	6	2	6

=== Fifth qualifier ===
First round
5	(Sweden) Fredrik Jonsson	6	6
(Argentina) Diego Moyano	3	1
(Italy) Giorgio Galimberti	7	6
(France) Nicolas Coutelot	5	2
(Belarus) Alexander Shvets	6	6
(United States) Hugo Armando	2	2
(France) Grégory Carraz	4	6	2
28	(United States) Alex O'Brien	6	4	6

Second round
5	(Sweden) Fredrik Jonsson	6	6
(Italy) Giorgio Galimberti	4	2
(Belarus) Alexander Shvets	1	2
28	(United States) Alex O'Brien	6	6

Qualifying competition
5	(Sweden) Fredrik Jonsson	4	6^{3}	6^{6}
28	(United States) Alex O'Brien	6	7^{7}	7^{8}

=== Sixth qualifier ===
First round
6	(France) Cyril Saulnier	7^{7}	3	6
(South Korea) Yoon Yong-il	6^{5}	6	3
(Israel) Lior Mor	5	3
WC	(United Kingdom) Luke Milligan	7	6
(Brazil) Daniel Melo	6	4	6
(Spain) Ignacio Truyol	4	6	4
(Australia) Joseph Sirianni	3	3
27	(United States) Michael Russell	6	6

Second round
6	(France) Cyril Saulnier	6	6
WC	(United Kingdom) Luke Milligan	2	3
(Brazil) Daniel Melo	4	4
27	(United States) Michael Russell	6	6

Qualifying competition
6	(France) Cyril Saulnier	6	2	3	3
27	(United States) Michael Russell	4	6	6	6

=== Seventh qualifier ===
First round
7	(Germany) David Prinosil	6	6
(Greece) Vasilis Mazarakis	3	3
(Slovakia) Ladislav Švarc	0	1
(France) Guillaume Raoux	6	6
(United States) Bob Bryan	6	6^{5}	6
(United States) Michael Sell	4	7^{7}	2
(Spain) David Caballero	3	2
26	(Mexico) Alejandro Hernández	6	6

Second round
7	(Germany) David Prinosil	7^{7}	6
(France) Guillaume Raoux	6^{3}	2
(United States) Bob Bryan	6	6
26	(Mexico) Alejandro Hernández	3	4

Qualifying competition
7	(Germany) David Prinosil	3	4	6	6	6
(United States) Bob Bryan	6	6	3	3	1

=== Eighth qualifier ===
First round
8	(Australia) James Sekulov	4	1
(South Africa) Neville Godwin	6	6
(Pakistan) Aisam-ul-Haq Qureshi	7	2	3
(South Korea) Lee Hyung-taik	5	6	6
(Federal Republic of Yugoslavia) Dušan Vemić	6	6
(Japan) Yaoki Ishii	2	4
(Argentina) Damián Furmanski	4	4
25	(Germany) Michael Kohlmann	6	6

Second round
(South Africa) Neville Godwin	7	4	6
(South Korea) Lee Hyung-taik	5	6	2
(Federal Republic of Yugoslavia) Dušan Vemić	3	5
25	(Germany) Michael Kohlmann	6	7

Qualifying competition
(South Africa) Neville Godwin	6	2	2	6	6
25	(Germany) Michael Kohlmann	2	6	6	4	0

=== Ninth qualifier ===
First round
9	(Canada) Sébastien Lareau	6	7^{9}
(Bulgaria) Ivaylo Traykov	4	6^{7}
(United States) Glenn Weiner	4	2
(Italy) Diego Nargiso	6	6
(Canada) Frédéric Niemeyer	6^{4}	6	3
WC	(United Kingdom) Lee Childs	7^{7}	4	6
(Australia) Paul Kilderry	7^{7}	4	6
24	(Argentina) Sebastián Prieto	6^{5}	6	2

Second round
9	(Canada) Sébastien Lareau	6	7^{7}
(Italy) Diego Nargiso	1	6^{1}
WC	(United Kingdom) Lee Childs	3	3
(Australia) Paul Kilderry	6	6

Qualifying competition
9	(Canada) Sébastien Lareau	6	6	3	2	6
(Australia) Paul Kilderry	2	4	6	6	8

=== Tenth qualifier ===
First round
10	(Israel) Harel Levy	6	6
(France) Olivier Mutis	0	3
(Australia) Michael Hill	7	6
(Czech Republic) Ota Fukárek	5	2
(Croatia) Ivo Karlović	6	7^{7}
(United States) James Blake	3	6^{5}
(United States) Tom Chicoine	2	4
23	(Spain) Óscar Burrieza	6	6

Second round
10	(Israel) Harel Levy	4	6	6
(Australia) Michael Hill	6	3	3
(Croatia) Ivo Karlović	7^{8}	7^{7}
23	(Spain) Óscar Burrieza	6^{6}	6^{5}

Qualifying competition
10	(Israel) Harel Levy	6	6	6
(Croatia) Ivo Karlović	2	3	3

=== Eleventh qualifier ===
First round
11	(South Africa) Marcos Ondruska	6	6
(Ecuador) Luis Morejón	4	2
(Israel) Oren Motevassel	3	4
WC	(United Kingdom) Nick Gould	6	6
(Sweden) Nicklas Kulti	7^{7}	7
(India) Srinath Prahlad	6^{3}	5
(Australia) Matthew Breen	3	2
21	(France) Michaël Llodra	6	6

Second round
11	(South Africa) Marcos Ondruska	3	4
WC	(United Kingdom) Nick Gould	6	6
(Sweden) Nicklas Kulti	1	2
21	(France) Michaël Llodra	6	6

Qualifying competition
WC	(United Kingdom) Nick Gould	5	2	5
21	(France) Michaël Llodra	7	6	7

=== Twelfth qualifier ===
First round
12	(Zimbabwe) Wayne Black	6	2	6
(Venezuela) Jimy Szymanski	4	6	4
(Italy) Mosé Navarra	6	6
WC	(United Kingdom) Colin Bennett	4	4
(Czech Republic) Radek Štěpánek	6	6
(Slovakia) Boris Borgula	4	0
WC	(United Kingdom) Tom Spinks	3	6	1
22	(Australia) Dejan Petrovic	6	3	6

Second round
12	(Zimbabwe) Wayne Black	6	6
(Italy) Mosé Navarra	4	3
(Czech Republic) Radek Štěpánek	3	4
22	(Australia) Dejan Petrovic	6	6

Qualifying competition
12	(Zimbabwe) Wayne Black	3	6^{5}	6	6	1
22	(Australia) Dejan Petrovic	6	7^{7}	2	4	6

=== Thirteenth qualifier ===
First round
13	(Italy) Stefano Pescosolido	3	3
WC	(Austria) Jürgen Melzer	6	6
(Portugal) Bernardo Mota	3	2
(France) Rodolphe Gilbert	6	6
(Germany) Andy Fahlke	4	4
(Spain) Feliciano López	6	6
(Chile) Adrián García	7^{7}	2	3
20	(Austria) Werner Eschauer	6^{5}	6	6

Second round
WC	(Austria) Jürgen Melzer	6	6
(France) Rodolphe Gilbert	1	1
(Spain) Feliciano López	7^{7}	4	5
20	(Austria) Werner Eschauer	6^{5}	6	7

Qualifying competition
WC	(Austria) Jürgen Melzer	6	6	7
20	(Austria) Werner Eschauer	2	3	5

=== Fourteenth qualifier ===
First round
14	(United States) Kevin Kim	6	4	1
(France) Jean-François Bachelot	2	6	6
(France) Olivier Patience	7^{8}	6
(Israel) Noam Behr	6^{6}	4
WC	(United Kingdom) Mark Hilton	2	6	8
WC	(United Kingdom) James Nelson	6	0	10
(United States) Michael Joyce	1	4
19	(Germany) Christian Vinck	6	6

Second round
(France) Jean-François Bachelot	2	6	7
(France) Olivier Patience	6	2	5
WC	(United Kingdom) James Nelson	3	6	1
19	(Germany) Christian Vinck	6	4	6

Qualifying competition
(France) Jean-François Bachelot	5	6	6^{5}	7^{8}	3
19	(Germany) Christian Vinck	7	2	7^{7}	6^{6}	6

=== Fifteenth qualifier ===
First round
15	(Italy) Cristiano Caratti	2	7^{7}	6
(United States) Jeff Salzenstein	6	6^{4}	1
(Italy) Florian Allgauer	4	2
(Switzerland) Ivo Heuberger	6	6
(Georgia (country)) Irakli Labadze	6	6
(Italy) Riccardo Ciruolo	3	2
PR	(South Africa) Justin Bower	6^{6}	6	6
17	(Germany) Axel Pretzsch	7^{8}	4	4

Second round
15	(Italy) Cristiano Caratti	6	4	9
(Switzerland) Ivo Heuberger	1	6	11
(Georgia (country)) Irakli Labadze	3	6^{6}
PR	(South Africa) Justin Bower	6	7^{8}

Qualifying competition
(Switzerland) Ivo Heuberger	6	4	6	4	7
PR	(South Africa) Justin Bower	4	6	3	6	9

=== Sixteenth qualifier ===
First round
16	(Czech Republic) Petr Luxa	2	7^{7}	6
(Brazil) Alexandre Simoni	6	6^{4}	2
(United States) Taylor Dent	6	6
(Argentina) Hector Moretti	1	4
PR	(Czech Republic) Radomír Vašek	3	4
(Japan) Takahiro Terachi	6	6
(Germany) Lars Burgsmüller	7^{7}	4	6
18	(Finland) Tuomas Ketola	6^{3}	6	3

Second round
16	(Czech Republic) Petr Luxa	5	2
(United States) Taylor Dent	7	6
(Japan) Takahiro Terachi	3	2
(Germany) Lars Burgsmüller	6	6

Qualifying competition
(United States) Taylor Dent	6	6	7^{7}
(Germany) Lars Burgsmüller	3	4	6^{4}
