= 2000 Grand Prix Hassan II =

- Date: 10–17 April
- Edition: 16th
- Category: International Series
- Draw: 32S / 16D
- Prize money: $325,000
- Surface: Clay / outdoor
- Location: Casablanca, Morocco

Champions

Singles
- (Spain) Fernando Vicente

Doubles
- (France) Arnaud Clément / (France) Sébastien Grosjean
- Grand Prix Hassan II

The 2000 Grand Prix Hassan II was an Association of Tennis Professionals men's tennis tournament held in Casablanca, Morocco. It was the 16th edition of the tournament and was held from 10 April until 17 April 2000. Sixth-seeded Fernando Vicente won the singles title.

== Finals ==
=== Singles ===
(Spain) Fernando Vicente defeated (France) Sébastien Grosjean 6–4, 4–6, 7–6^{(7–3)}

- It was Vicente's only title of the year and the 2nd of his career.

=== Doubles ===
(France) Arnaud Clément / (France) Sébastien Grosjean defeated (Germany) Lars Burgsmüller / (Australia) Andrew Painter 7–6^{(7–4)}, 6–4

- It was Clément's 1st title of the year and the 1st of his career. It was Grosjean's 1st title of the year and the 1st of his career.
