= Amanda Grahame =

Australian tennis player

- Full name: Amanda Grahame
- Country (sports): Australia
- Born: 25 March 1979 (age 46); Canberra, Australia
- Plays: Left-handed
- Prize money: $155,971

Singles
- Career record: 164–154
- Highest ranking: No. 159 (18 November 2002)

Grand Slam singles results
- Australian Open: 1R (2000, 2001, 2002)
- French Open: Q1 (2002)
- Wimbledon: Q1 (2000, 2002)
- US Open: Q3 (1998)

Doubles
- Career record: 84–109
- Highest ranking: No. 133 (3 May 1999)

Grand Slam doubles results
- Australian Open: 2R (1999)
- French Open: 1R (1999)
- Wimbledon: Q1 (2000)
- US Open: Q1 (1999)

Amanda Grahame (born 25 March 1979) is a former professional tennis player from Australia.

== Biography ==
Grahame was born in Canberra, one of four daughters of stockbroker Denis and maths teacher Jeanette. Coached by Chris Kachel, Grahame began competing on the professional tour in 1997. She won three ITF Circuit singles titles locally in 1998 as well as the doubles at the $25,000 Lexington event. In 1999 she made the second round of the Australian Open doubles with Bryanne Stewart and played in the main doubles draw of the French Open. At the 2000 Australian Open she competed in the singles draw for the first of three times and lost a close opening round match to Serena Williams. She led the American 4–2 in the first set which she lost, then claimed the second set, but went down 4–6 in the third. Her best performances on the WTA Tour were at the Canberra International. She made the doubles quarter-finals in 2001 with Justine Henin and was a singles semi-finalist as a qualifier in 2002, with wins over Barbara Rittner, Rachel McQuillan and Petra Mandula.

== ITF finals ==
Legend
$75,000 tournaments
$25,000 tournaments
$10,000 tournaments

=== Singles (3–6) ===
Outcome	No.	Date	Location	Surface	Opponent	Score
Runner-up	1.	28 September 1997	Tokyo, Japan	Hard	(Japan) Ryoko Takemura	3–6, 7–5, 4–6
Winner	1.	8 March 1998	Warrnambool, Australia	Grass	(Australia) Melissa Beadman	4–6, 6–2, 6–1
Winner	2.	22 March 1998	Canberra, Australia	Grass	(Czech Republic) Eva Krejčová	6–3, 6–4
Winner	3.	29 March 1998	Bendigo, Australia	Grass	(Czech Republic) Eva Krejčová	6–3, 6–2
Runner-up	2.	19 April 1998	Benalla, Australia	Clay	(Romania) Mira Lorelei Radu	7–5, 6–7, 6–7
Runner-up	3.	28 June 1998	Springfield, United States	Hard	(United States) Alison Cohen	2–6, 3–6
Runner-up	4.	29 November 1998	Nuriootpa, Australia	Hard	(United States) Karin Miller	2–6, 2–6
Runner-up	5.	19 May 2002	Bromma, Sweden	Hard	(Spain) Conchita Martínez Granados	7–6, 3–6, 2–6
Runner-up	6.	14 October 2002	Mackay, Australia	Hard	(South Africa) Chanelle Scheepers	6–7, 5–7

=== Doubles (3–10) ===
Outcome	No.	Date	Tournament	Surface	Partner	Opponents	Score
Runner-up	1.	24 March 1997	Warrnambool, Australia	Grass	(Australia) Evie Dominikovic	(United Kingdom) Lorna Woodroffe (United Kingdom) Joanne Ward	6–4, 4–6, 2–6
Runner-up	2.	5 October 1997	Kyoto, Japan	Carpet (i)	(Japan) Shiho Hisamatsu	(Japan) Saori Honda (Japan) Aiko Matsuda	6–2, 1–6, 3–6
Runner-up	3.	28 June 1998	Springfield, United States	Hard	(Australia) Bryanne Stewart	(United States) Amanda Augustus (United States) Julie Thu	0–6, 0–6
Winner	1.	3 August 1998	Lexington, United States	Hard	(Australia) Bryanne Stewart	(India) Nirupama Sanjeev (China) Yi Jing-Qian	6–4, 1–6, 6–3
Runner-up	4.	22 November 1998	Port Pirie, Australia	Hard	(Australia) Bryanne Stewart	(Australia) Catherine Barclay (Australia) Trudi Musgrave	7–5, 5–7, 2–6
Winner	2.	12 April 1999	Cagnes-sur-Mer, France	Hard	(United Kingdom) Karen Cross	(Australia) Louise Pleming (France) Catherine Tanvier	6–4, 3–6, 7–6^{(8–6)}
Winner	3.	28 February 2000	Bendigo, Australia	Hard	(Australia) Evie Dominikovic	(Australia) Trudi Musgrave (Australia) Bryanne Stewart	6–4, 6–1
Runner-up	5.	23 April 2000	Fresno, United States	Hard	(Australia) Evie Dominikovic	(Australia) Rachel McQuillan (Australia) Lisa McShea	4–6, 4–6
Runner-up	6.	30 April 2000	Sarasota, United States	Hard	(Australia) Evie Dominikovic	(United States) Sandra Cacic (United States) Meghann Shaughnessy	4–6, 2–6
Runner-up	7.	3 December 2000	Mount Gambier, Australia	Hard	(Australia) Evie Dominikovic	(South Africa) Nannie de Villiers (Australia) Annabel Ellwood	2–6, 2–6
Runner-up	8.	10 December 2000	Port Pirie, Australia	Hard	(Australia) Evie Dominikovic	(South Africa) Nannie de Villiers (Australia) Annabel Ellwood	6–3, 2–6, 4–6
Runner-up	9.	3 July 2001	Vaihingen, Germany	Clay	(Hungary) Gréta Arn	(Czech Republic) Dája Bedáňová (Czech Republic) Eva Martincová	6–0, 3–6, 3–6
Runner-up	10.	2 December 2001	Mount Gambier, Australia	Hard	(Australia) Cindy Watson	(Australia) Evie Dominikovic (Australia) Samantha Stosur	4–6, 4–6
