= 1998 Grand Prix Hassan II – Doubles =

Doubles
- 1998 Grand Prix Hassan II

Final
- Champions: (Italy) Andrea Gaudenzi (Italy) Diego Nargiso
- Runners-up: (Italy) Cristian Brandi (Italy) Filippo Messori
- Score: 6–4, 7–6

Events
Singles	Doubles
← 1997 ·	Grand Prix Hassan II	· 1999 →

João Cunha e Silva and Nuno Marques were the defending champions, but lost in the first round this year.

Andrea Gaudenzi and Diego Nargiso won in the final 6–4, 7–6, against Cristian Brandi and Filippo Messori.

== Seeds ==
1. (Netherlands) Tom Kempers / (Netherlands) Menno Oosting (semifinals)
2. (Spain) Tomás Carbonell / (Germany) Jens Knippschild (semifinals)
3. (Australia) Wayne Arthurs / (Belgium) Libor Pimek (quarterfinals)
4. (Italy) Cristian Brandi / (Italy) Filippo Messori (final)

== Draw ==
=== Key ===
- Q = Qualifier
- WC = Wild card
- LL = Lucky loser
- Alt = Alternate
- ITF = ITF entry
- PR = Protected ranking
- SR = Special ranking
- SE = Special exempt
- JE = Junior exempt
- JR = Junior Accelerator Programme entrant
- CO = College Accelerator Programme entrant
- NG = Next Gen Accelerator Program entrant
- w/o = Walkover
- r = Retired
- d = Defaulted

=== Draw ===
First round
1	(Netherlands) T Kempers (Netherlands) M Oosting	7	6	6
(Germany) M Kohlmann (Australia) G Silcock	5	7	3
WC	(Morocco) K Alami (Morocco) H Arazi	6	6
Q	(Argentina) G Etlis (Australia) T Larkham	2	4
4	(Italy) C Brandi (Italy) F Messori	6	5	6
(Italy) M Ardinghi (Italy) V Santopadre	3	7	4
WC	(France) A Boetsch (Morocco) M El Aarej	3	4
(Argentina) D del Río (Argentina) M Puerta	6	6
(Spain) JI Carrasco (Spain) Á López Morón	2	3
WC	(Italy) A Gaudenzi (Italy) D Nargiso	6	6
(Portugal) J Cunha e Silva (Portugal) N Marques	6	3
3	(Australia) W Arthurs (Belgium) L Pimek	7	6
(Netherlands) S Noteboom (Belgium) T Vanhoudt	6	6	2
(Egypt) T El-Sawy (Italy) D Sanguinetti	4	7	6
(Spain) J Burillo (Spain) A Martín	6	5
2	(Spain) T Carbonell (Germany) J Knippschild	7	7

Quarterfinals
1	(Netherlands) T Kempers (Netherlands) M Oosting	7	6
WC	(Morocco) K Alami (Morocco) H Arazi	5	3
4	(Italy) C Brandi (Italy) F Messori	6	6
(Argentina) D del Río (Argentina) M Puerta	1	3
WC	(Italy) A Gaudenzi (Italy) D Nargiso	7	1	7
3	(Australia) W Arthurs (Belgium) L Pimek	5	6	5
(Egypt) T El-Sawy (Italy) D Sanguinetti	6	2
2	(Spain) T Carbonell (Germany) J Knippschild	7	6

Semifinals
1	(Netherlands) T Kempers (Netherlands) M Oosting	6	6	3
4	(Italy) C Brandi (Italy) F Messori	7	4	6
WC	(Italy) A Gaudenzi (Italy) D Nargiso	2	6	6
2	(Spain) T Carbonell (Germany) J Knippschild	6	4	2

Final
4	(Italy) C Brandi (Italy) F Messori	4	6
WC	(Italy) A Gaudenzi (Italy) D Nargiso	6	7
