= 1999 Grand Prix Hassan II – Doubles =

Doubles
- 1999 Grand Prix Hassan II

Final
- Champions: (Brazil) Fernando Meligeni; (Brazil) Jaime Oncins
- Runners-up: (Italy) Massimo Ardinghi; (Italy) Vincenzo Santopadre
- Score: 6–2, 6–3

Events
Singles	Doubles
← 1998 ·	Grand Prix Hassan II	· 2000 →

Andrea Gaudenzi and Diego Nargiso were the defending champions, but did not participate this year.

Fernando Meligeni and Jaime Oncins won in the final 6–2, 6–3, against Massimo Ardinghi and Vincenzo Santopadre.

== Seeds ==
1. (Italy) Cristian Brandi / (Italy) Massimo Bertolini (semifinals)
2. (Czech Republic) Tomáš Cibulec / (North Macedonia) Aleksandar Kitinov (quarterfinals)
3. (Spain) Juan Ignacio Carrasco / (Spain) Jairo Velasco Jr. (quarterfinals)
4. (Brazil) Fernando Meligeni / (Brazil) Jaime Oncins (champions)

== Draw ==
=== Key ===
- Q = Qualifier
- WC = Wild card
- LL = Lucky loser
- Alt = Alternate
- ITF = ITF entry
- PR = Protected ranking
- SR = Special ranking
- SE = Special exempt
- JE = Junior exempt
- JR = Junior Accelerator Programme entrant
- CO = College Accelerator Programme entrant
- NG = Next Gen Accelerator Program entrant
- w/o = Walkover
- r = Retired
- d = Defaulted

=== Finals ===
First round

Quarterfinals

Semifinals

Final

1
- (Italy) C Brandi
- (Italy) M Bertolini
6
6

- (Serbia and Montenegro) N Djordjevic
- (Belgium) L Pimek
2
4

1
- (Italy) C Brandi
- (Italy) M Bertolini
6
6

- (Spain) A Martín
- (Netherlands) S Noteboom
4
7
4

WC
- (Spain) Á Calatrava
- (Spain) F Vicente
3
4

WC
- (Spain) Á Calatrava
- (Spain) F Vicente
6
5
6

1
- (Italy) C Brandi
- (Italy) M Bertolini
2
2

4
- (Brazil) F Meligeni
- (Brazil) J Oncins
6
6

4
- (Brazil) F Meligeni
- (Brazil) J Oncins
6
6

- (Brazil) M Carlsson
- (Brazil) A Sá
2
4

4
- (Brazil) F Meligeni
- (Brazil) J Oncins
7
6

Q
- (Argentina) G Cañas
- (Spain) S Navarro
6
6
6

Q
- (Argentina) G Cañas
- (Spain) S Navarro
6
3

- (Spain) Á López Morón
- (Spain) A Portas
3
7
3

4
- (Brazil) F Meligeni
- (Brazil) J Oncins
6
6

- (United States) A Peterson
- (United States) C Tontz
1
7
2

- (Italy) M Ardinghi
- (Italy) V Santopadre
2
3

WC
- (Morocco) K Alami
- (Belgium) T Vanhoudt
6
6
6

WC
- (Morocco) K Alami
- (Belgium) T Vanhoudt
6
3
6

- (Germany) J Knippschild
- (Netherlands) F Wibier
4
4

3
- (Spain) JI Carrasco
- (Spain) J Velasco Jr.
4
6
4

3
- (Spain) JI Carrasco
- (Spain) J Velasco Jr.
6
6

WC
- (Morocco) K Alami
- (Belgium) T Vanhoudt
1
4

WC
- (Morocco) M El Aarej
- (Morocco) T Ouahabi
3
4

- (Italy) M Ardinghi
- (Italy) V Santopadre
6
6

- (Italy) M Ardinghi
- (Italy) V Santopadre
6
6

- (Italy) M Ardinghi
- (Italy) V Santopadre
6
6

- (Czech Republic) T Anzari
- (Romania) D Pescariu
3
4

2
- (Czech Republic) T Cibulec
- (North Macedonia) A Kitinov
4
4

2
- (Czech Republic) T Cibulec
- (North Macedonia) A Kitinov
6
6
