= 1999 Grand Prix Hassan II =

- Date: 22–29 March
- Edition: 15th
- Category: World Series
- Draw: 32S / 16D
- Prize money: $215,000
- Surface: Clay / outdoor
- Location: Casablanca, Morocco

Champions

Singles
- (Spain) Alberto Martín

Doubles
- (Brazil) Fernando Meligeni / (Brazil) Jaime Oncins
- Grand Prix Hassan II

The 1999 Grand Prix Hassan II was an Association of Tennis Professionals tennis tournament held in Casablanca, Morocco. It was the 15th edition of the Grand Prix Hassan II and was held from March 22 to March 29, 1999.

== Finals ==
=== Singles ===
(Spain) Alberto Martín defeated (Spain) Fernando Vicente, 6–3, 6–4.

- It was Martin's 1st singles title of his career.

=== Doubles ===
(Brazil) Fernando Meligeni / (Brazil) Jaime Oncins defeated (Italy) Massimo Ardinghi / (Italy) Vincenzo Santopadre, 6–2, 6–3.

- It was Meligeni's only title of the year and the 10th of his career. It was Oncins's 2nd title of the year and the 6th of his career.
