= Charles Auffray =

French tennis player

- Country (sports): France
- Born: 24 February 1973 (age 52)
- Height: 6 ft (183 cm)
- Turned pro: 1996
- Plays: Right-handed
- Prize money: $74,867

Singles
- Career record: 1–6
- Career titles: 0
- Highest ranking: No. 191 (6 July 1998)

Grand Slam singles results
- French Open: 1R (1998)

Charles Auffray (born 24 February 1973) is a former professional tennis player from France.

Auffray made the second round of the 1998 Grand Prix Hassan II tournament in Casablanca, defeating German Jens Knippschild. It would be the only match he won on the ATP Tour.

He faced reigning champion Gustavo Kuerten at the 1998 French Open and lost in straight sets.
