= Petra Rampre =

Slovenian tennis player

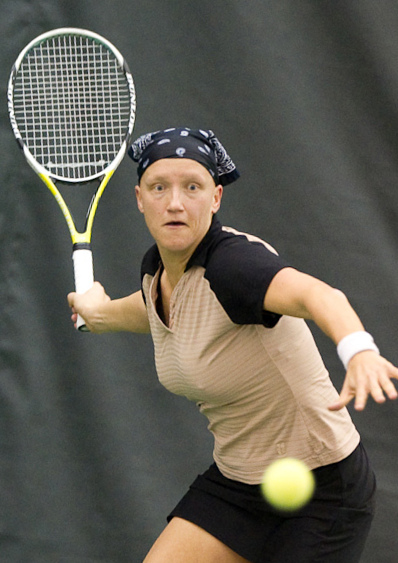
- Rampre, in 2010
- Country (sports): Slovenia
- Residence: Žiri, Slovenia
- Born: 20 January 1980 (age 45); Ljubljana, SFR Yugoslavia
- Height: 1.70 m (5 ft 7 in)
- Turned pro: 1996
- Plays: Right-handed (one-handed backhand)
- Prize money: US$342,142

Singles
- Career record: 478–448
- Career titles: 8 ITF
- Highest ranking: 151 (30 April 2012)
- Current ranking: 970 (1 August 2016)

Grand Slam singles results
- Australian Open: Q1 (2000, 2001, 2012)
- French Open: Q1 (2000, 2001, 2012)
- Wimbledon: Q3 (2012)
- US Open: Q2 (1999, 2011, 2013)

Doubles
- Career record: 134–207
- Career titles: 5 ITF
- Highest ranking: 84 (20 November 2000)

Grand Slam doubles results
- Australian Open: 1R (2001)
- French Open: 2R (2000)
- Wimbledon: 1R (2000)

Team competitions
- Fed Cup: 1–9

Petra Rampre (born 20 January 1980) is a Slovenian former professional tennis player.

In her career, she won eight singles and five doubles titles on the ITF Circuit. On 30 April 2012, she reached her best singles ranking of world No. 151. On 20 November 2000, she peaked at No. 84 in the WTA doubles rankings.

== Illness ==
Rampre developed alopecia universalis and lost all her hair within three weeks; she utilises bandannas to cover the result.

== Biography ==
Rampre began playing tennis at age ten with her family, and preferred hard or grass courts. Her father, Daniel, is a singer and musician; mother, Berta, is an administrator; she has a younger brother, Aljaz.

Rampre played her last match on the professional circuit in 2016.

== WTA career finals ==
=== Doubles: 1 (runner-up) ===
Legend
Grand Slam tournaments
Premier Mandatory & Premier 5
Premier
International (0–1)

| Result | Date | Tournament | Surface | Partner | Opponents | Score |
|---|---|---|---|---|---|---|
| Loss | May 2000 | Belgian Open | Clay | (United States) Jennifer Hopkins | (Belgium) Sabine Appelmans (Belgium) Kim Clijsters | 1–6, 1–6 |

== ITF Circuit finals ==
$100,000 tournaments
$75,000 tournaments
$50,000 tournaments
$25,000 tournaments
$10,000 tournaments

=== Singles: 15 (8 titles, 7 runner-ups) ===
| Result | No. | Date | Tournament | Surface | Opponent | Score |
|---|---|---|---|---|---|---|
| Loss | 1. | Dec 1995 | ITF Přerov, Czech Republic | Hard | (Czech Republic) Jana Pospíšilová | 2–6, 6–7 |
| Loss | 2. | Nov 1996 | ITF Ramat Hasharon, Israel | Hard | (United States) Pam Nelson | 4–6, 6–3, 2–6 |
| Win | 1. | Aug 1998 | ITF Pamplona, Spain | Hard (i) | (Germany) Meike Fröhlich | 6–2, 7–6^{(3)} |
| Win | 2. | Jun 1999 | ITF Montreal, Canada | Hard | (Japan) Tomoe Hotta | 6–4, 7–5 |
| Win | 3. | 13 January 2002 | Tallahassee, United States | Hard | (United States) Andrea Nathan | 4–6, 6–3, 6–4 |
| Loss | 3. | 2 February 2003 | Rockford, United States | Hard (i) | (Czech Republic) Michaela Paštiková | 3–6, 6–3, 4–6 |
| Loss | 4. | 4 June 2006 | Houston, United States | Hard (i) | (United States) Julie Ditty | 4–6, 7–6^{(4)}, 3–6 |
| Loss | 5. | 24 May 2009 | Landisville, United States | Hard | (United States) Laura Granville | 2–6, 1–6 |
| Win | 4. | 31 May 2009 | Sumter, United States | Hard | (Romania) Anda Perianu | 6–1, 6–4 |
| Win | 5. | 20 June 2010 | Mount Pleasant, United States | Clay | (United States) Lauren Davis | 6–3, 6–2 |
| Win | 6. | 15 May 2011 | Raleigh, United States | Clay | (Italy) Camila Giorgi | 6–3, 6–2 |
| Loss | 6. | 12 June 2011 | El Paso, United States | Hard | (United States) Chiara Scholl | 5–7, 5–7 |
| Win | 7. | 26 June 2011 | Boston, United States | Hard | (United States) Tetiana Luzhanska | 6–4, 5–7, 6–4 |
| Win | 8. | 5 May 2013 | Indian Harbour Beach, United States | Clay | (Bulgaria) Dia Evtimova | 6–0, 6–1 |
| Loss | 7. | Jun 2013 | ITF Las Cruces, United States | Hard | (Japan) Mayo Hibi | 3–6, 0–6 |

=== Doubles: 17 (5–12) ===
| Result | No. | Date | Tournament | Surface | Partner | Opponents | Score |
|---|---|---|---|---|---|---|---|
| Loss | 1. | 26 July 1997 | ITF Valladolid, Spain | Hard | (Belgium) Daphne van de Zande | (Sweden) Sofia Finér (Sweden) Anna-Karin Svensson | 4–6, 3–6 |
| Loss | 2. | 31 October 1997 | ITF Ramat Hasharon, Israel | Hard | (Slovenia) Katarina Srebotnik | (Germany) Kirstin Freye (Israel) Hila Rosen | 1–6, 1–6 |
| Loss | 3. | 18 July 1998 | ITF Getxo, Spain | Clay | (Japan) Tomoe Hotta | (Spain) Lourdes Domínguez Lino (Brazil) Vanessa Menga | 6–3, 4–6, 5–7 |
| Loss | 4. | 12 September 1998 | Fano, Italy | Clay | (Slovakia) Patrícia Marková | (Spain) Lourdes Domínguez Lino (Italy) Laura Dell'Angelo | 6–7, 6–2, 3–6 |
| Loss | 5. | 19 June 1999 | Mount Pleasant, United States | Hard | (United States) Jennifer Hopkins | (United States) Wendy Fix (United States) Lindsay Lee-Waters | 3–6, 6–7 |
| Loss | 6. | 9 October 1999 | Saga, Japan | Grass | (South Korea) Kim Eun-ha | (Australia) Catherine Barclay-Reitz (Canada) Vanessa Webb | 7–6, 3–6, 2–6 |
| Win | 7. | 16 September 2000 | Hopewell, United States | Hard | (United States) Jennifer Hopkins | (Russia) Evgenia Kulikovskaya (United States) Jolene Watanabe-Giltz | 6–3, 6–1 |
| Loss | 8. | 30 September 2000 | Santa Clara, United States | Hard | (United States) Dawn Buth | (Netherlands) Seda Noorlander (Germany) Kirstin Freye | 1–6, 4–6 |
| Loss | 9. | 18 February 2001 | Midland, United States | Hard (i) | (United States) Jennifer Hopkins | (Netherlands) Yvette Basting (Ukraine) Elena Tatarkova | 6–3, 6–7^{(4)}, 4–6 |
| Loss | 10. | 4 August 2001 | Vancouver Open, Canada | Hard | (Canada) Vanessa Webb | (United States) Erika deLone (Canada) Renata Kolbovic | 6–2, 4–6, 4–6 |
| Win | 11. | 20 January 2002 | ITF Gainesville, United States | Hard | (Canada) Vanessa Webb | (United States) Beau Jones (Latvia) Anžela Žguna | 6–3, 5–7, 6–4 |
| Loss | 12 . | 7 July 2002 | ITF Stuttgart, Germany | Clay | (Belarus) Darya Kustova | (Austria) Barbara Schwartz (Germany) Jasmin Wöhr | 7–5, 4–6, 6–7^{(4)} |
| Win | 13. | 12 January 2003 | Tallahassee, United States | Hard | (Czech Republic) Vladimíra Uhlířová | (Germany) Antonia Matic (United States) Arpi Kojian | 6–2, 7–6^{(5)} |
| Loss | 14. | 5 October 2003 | Troy, United States | Hard | (United States) Lindsay Lee-Waters | (United States) Bethanie Mattek-Sands (United States) Shenay Perry | 2–6, 6–2, 4–6 |
| Win | 15. | 17 July 2005 | Baltimore, United States | Hard | (United States) Beau Jones | (United States) Tarakaa Bertrand (United States) Amanda Fish | 6–3, 7–5 |
| Win | 16. | 10 October 2009 | ITF Troy, United States | Hard | (Austria) Nicole Rottmann | (Argentina) Jorgelina Cravero (Romania) Edina Gallovits-Hall | 6–3, 3–6, [10–8] |
| Loss | 17. | 19 June 2010 | ITF Mount Pleasant, United States | Hard | (United States) Shelby Rogers | (United States) Kaitlyn Christian (United States) Caitlin Whoriskey | 4–6, 2–6 |

== Singles performance timeline ==
Key
| W | F | SF | QF | #R | RR | Q# | P# | DNQ | A | Z# | PO | G | S | B | NMS | NTI | P | NH |

(W) winner; (F) finalist; (SF) semifinalist; (QF) quarterfinalist; (#R) rounds 4, 3, 2, 1; (RR) round-robin stage; (Q#) qualification round; (P#) preliminary round; (DNQ) did not qualify; (A) absent; (Z#) Davis/Fed Cup Zonal Group (with number indication) or (PO) play-off; (G) gold, (S) silver or (B) bronze Olympic/Paralympic medal; (NMS) not a Masters tournament; (NTI) not a Tier I tournament; (P) postponed; (NH) not held; (SR) strike rate (events won / competed); (W–L) win–loss record.

| Tournament | 1998 | 1999 | 2000 | 2001 | 2011 | 2012 | Career W–L |
|---|---|---|---|---|---|---|---|
| Grand Slam tournaments | | | | | | | |
| Australian Open | A | A | Q1 | Q1 | A | Q1 | 0–0 |
| French Open | A | A | Q1 | Q1 | A | Q1 | 0–0 |
| Wimbledon | A | A | Q1 | Q1 | A | Q3 | 0–0 |
| US Open | Q1 | Q2 | Q1 | A | Q2 | Q1 | 0–0 |
| Win–loss | 0–0 | 0–0 | 0–0 | 0–0 | 0–0 | 0–0 | 0–0 |
| Former International tournaments | | | | | | | |
| Antwerp | A | A | 1R | A | Not Held | | 0–1 |
| Bogotá | A | A | A | A | A | 2R | 1–1 |
| Acapulco | A | A | A | A | A | 1R | 0–1 |
| Klagenfurt | A | A | 2R | A | A | A | 1–1 |
| Washington | A | A | A | A | 1R | A | 0–1 |
| Quebec City | A | A | A | A | A | 2R | 1–1 |
| Win–loss | 0–0 | 0–0 | 1–2 | 0–0 | 0–1 | 2–3 | 3–6 |
| Fed Cup | | | | | | | |
| II. World Gr., I. Euro/Africa Zone | RR | A | A | A | A | PO | – |
| Win–loss | 0–2 | 0–0 | 0–0 | 0–0 | 0–0 | 0–3 | 0–5 |
| Career statistics | | | | | | | |
| Overall win–loss | 0–2 | 0–0 | 1–2 | 0–0 | 0–1 | 3–6 | 4–11 |
| Year-end ranking | 262 | 180 | 170 | 323 | 188 | 226 | No. 151 |
