= 2000 Grand Prix Hassan II – Singles =

Singles
- 2000 Grand Prix Hassan II

Final
- Champion: (Spain) Fernando Vicente
- Runner-up: (France) Sébastien Grosjean
- Score: 6–4, 4–6, 7–6^{(7–3)}

Details
- Draw: 32
- Seeds: 8

Events
| Singles | Doubles |
- Grand Prix Hassan II

Alberto Martín was the defending champion, but lost in the first round.

Fernando Vicente won the title, defeating Sébastien Grosjean 6–4, 4–6, 7–6^{(7–3)} in the final.

== Seeds ==
1. (Morocco) Younes El Aynaoui (quarterfinals)
2. (Morocco) Karim Alami (second round)
3. (Morocco) Hicham Arazi (quarterfinals)
4. (France) Sébastien Grosjean (final)
5. (Switzerland) Marc Rosset (first round)
6. (Spain) Fernando Vicente (champion)
7. (Argentina) Mariano Puerta (semifinals)
8. (France) Arnaud di Pasquale (semifinals)

== Draw ==
Key

- Q = Qualifier
- WC = Wild card
- LL = Lucky loser
- Alt = Alternate
- ITF = ITF entry
- PR = Protected ranking
- SR = Special ranking
- SE = Special exempt
- JE = Junior exempt
- JR = Junior Accelerator Programme entrant
- CO = College Accelerator Programme entrant
- NG = Next Gen Accelerator Program entrant
- w/o = Walkover
- r = Retired
- d = Defaulted

=== Finals ===
Semifinals
7 | (Argentina) Mariano Puerta | 4 | 6 | 1
4 | (France) Sébastien Grosjean | 6 | 3 | 6
6 | (Spain) Fernando Vicente | 6 | 1 | 6
8 | (France) Arnaud di Pasquale | 4 | 6 | 4

Final
4 | (France) Sébastien Grosjean | 4 | 6 | 6^{3}
6 | (Spain) Fernando Vicente | 6 | 4 | 7^{7}

=== Top half ===
First round
1 | (Morocco) Y El Aynaoui | 7 | 7
(Spain) A Portas | 5 | 5
(Italy) L Tieleman | 6 | 6
(Bulgaria) O Stanoytchev | 3 | 4
(Spain) J Díaz | 4^{r}
Q | (France) N Coutelot | 2
(Germany) M Hantschk | 4 | 2
7 | (Argentina) M Puerta | 6 | 6
4 | (France) S Grosjean | 6 | 6
(Italy) G Pozzi | 3 | 0
(Germany) A Popp | 4 | 0
Q | (Belgium) R Willems | 6 | 6
(Argentina) H Gumy | 6 | 6
(Spain) A Martín | 1 | 2
WC | (Spain) S Bruguera | 6
5 | (Switzerland) M Rosset | 2 | r

Second round
1 | (Morocco) Y El Aynaoui | 7^{7} | 6
(Italy) L Tieleman | 6^{4} | 4
Q | (France) N Coutelot | 2 | 4
7 | (Argentina) M Puerta | 6 | 6
4 | (France) S Grosjean | 6 | 6
Q | (Belgium) R Willems | 3 | 2
(Argentina) H Gumy | 2 | 6^{4}
WC | (Spain) S Bruguera | 6 | 7^{7}

Quarter-finals
1 | (Morocco) Y El Aynaoui | 6^{6} | 4
7 | (Argentina) M Puerta | 7^{8} | 6
4 | (France) S Grosjean | 6 | 6
WC | (Spain) S Bruguera | 0 | 0

Semi-finals
7 | (Argentina) M Puerta | 4 | 6 | 1
4 | (France) S Grosjean | 6 | 3 | 6

=== Bottom half ===
First round
6 | (Spain) F Vicente | 3 | 6 | 6
Q | (Russia) M Youzhny | 6 | 1 | 1
(France) T Guardiola | 2 | 2
Q | (Austria) H Wiltschnig | 6 | 6
WC | (Morocco) M Tahiri | 1 | 2
(Belgium) C Rochus | 6 | 6
(France) A Dupuis | 3 | 5
3 | (Morocco) H Arazi | 6 | 7
8 | (France) A di Pasquale | 6^{8} | 6 | 7
WC | (Morocco) M El Aarej | 7^{10} | 3 | 5
(Spain) Á López Morón | 6 | 6
(Switzerland) L Manta | 2 | 3
(France) A Clément | 6 | 3 | 3
(Sweden) A Vinciguerra | 4 | 6 | 6
(Germany) T Behrend | 3 | 4
2 | (Morocco) K Alami | 6 | 6

Second round
6 | (Spain) F Vicente | 6 | 6
Q | (Austria) H Wiltschnig | 2 | 3
(Belgium) C Rochus | 2 | 5
3 | (Morocco) H Arazi | 6 | 7
8 | (France) A di Pasquale | 6 | 6
(Spain) Á López Morón | 2 | 2
(Sweden) A Vinciguerra | 7^{7} | 7^{7}
2 | (Morocco) K Alami | 6^{5} | 6^{2}

Quarter-finals
6 | (Spain) F Vicente | 6^{6} | 6 | 6
3 | (Morocco) H Arazi | 7^{8} | 3 | 2
8 | (France) A di Pasquale | 6 | 6
(Sweden) A Vinciguerra | 2 | 3

Semi-finals
6 | (Spain) F Vicente | 6 | 1 | 6
8 | (France) A di Pasquale | 4 | 6 | 4
