= Andrew Painter (tennis) =

Australian tennis player (born 1975)

- Country (sports): Australia
- Born: 18 July 1975 (age 50) Sydney, Australia
- Height: 188 cm (6 ft 2 in)
- Turned pro: 1994
- Plays: Right-handed
- Prize money: $80,468

Singles
- Career record: 0–1
- Career titles: 0
- Highest ranking: No. 492 (10 Jul 1995)

Grand Slam singles results
- Australian Open: Q3 (1995)
- Wimbledon: 1R (1995)
- US Open: Q1 (1995)

Doubles
- Career record: 5–14
- Career titles: 0
- Highest ranking: No. 119 (4 Oct 1999)

Grand Slam doubles results
- Australian Open: 1R (1996, 1997, 1999)
- Wimbledon: 2R (1998)
- US Open: Q2 (1998, 1999)

Andrew Painter (born 18 July 1975) is a former professional tennis player from Australia.

== Career ==
Painter was a doubles specialist and appeared in the men's doubles main draw of the Australian Open three times, with Neil Borwick in 1996, Jamie Holmes in 1997 and Toby Mitchell in 1999. He wasn't able to progress past the first round in any of his appearances but did make the second round of the 1998 Wimbledon Championships, partnering Holmes. The pair defeated Czechs David Škoch and Petr Luxa.

He played in the main singles draw at the 1995 Wimbledon Championships and faced top seed Andre Agassi on centre court in the opening round. The Australian was beaten in straight sets.

At the 2000 Grand Prix Hassan II, an ATP Tour tournament, Painter and Lars Burgsmüller made the doubles final, which they lost to Arnaud Clément and Sébastien Grosjean. He won four Challenger doubles titles during his career.

== ATP career finals ==
=== Doubles: 1 (0–1) ===
Result	W/L	Date	Tournament	Surface	Partner	Opponents	Score
Loss	0–1	Apr 2000	Casablanca, Morocco	Clay	(Germany) Lars Burgsmüller	(France) Arnaud Clément (France) Sébastien Grosjean	6–7^{(4–7)}, 4–6

== Challenger titles ==
=== Doubles: (4) ===
No.	Year	Tournament	Surface	Partner	Opponents	Score
1.	1996	Perth, Australia	Hard	(Australia) Jamie Holmes	(Australia) Grant Doyle (Australia) Andrew Kratzmann	7–5, 6–4
2.	1999	Cherbourg, France	Hard	(Australia) Michael Hill	(Italy) Massimo Bertolini (Italy) Cristian Brandi	7–5, 7–6^{(9–7)}
3.	1999	Magdeburg, Germany	Carpet	(Australia) Michael Hill	(Germany) Jan-Ralph Brandt (Germany) Dirk Dier	7–6^{(10–8)}, 6–7^{(6–8)}, 7–6^{(7–1)}
4.	1999	Ulm, Germany	Clay	(South Africa) Byron Talbot	(Germany) Dirk Dier (Germany) Michael Kohlmann	6–3, 6–4
