= Lars Burgsmüller =

German tennis player

- Country (sports): Germany
- Residence: Altstätten, Switzerland
- Born: 6 December 1975 (age 49); Mülheim, West Germany
- Height: 1.83 m (6 ft 0 in)
- Turned pro: 1993
- Retired: 2008
- Plays: Right-handed (two-handed backhand)
- Prize money: $1,887,164

Singles
- Career record: 90–152
- Career titles: 1
- Highest ranking: No. 65 (18 February 2002)

Grand Slam singles results
- Australian Open: 3R (2001)
- French Open: 3R (2001)
- Wimbledon: 2R (2003, 2005)
- US Open: 2R (1999, 2003)

Doubles
- Career record: 31–70
- Career titles: 1
- Highest ranking: No. 61 (28 August 2006)

Grand Slam doubles results
- Australian Open: 1R (2001, 2003, 2004, 2005, 2006)
- Wimbledon: 2R (2006)
- US Open: 3R (2005)

Lars Burgsmüller (born 6 December 1975) is a German former professional tennis player. Burgsmüller reached a career-high ATP singles ranking of world No. 65, achieved on 18 February 2002. He also reached a career high ATP doubles ranking of world No. 61, achieved on 28 August 2006.

Burgsmüller reached two singles finals on the ATP Tour, winning the 2002 Copenhagen Open in Denmark where he defeated Olivier Rochus of Belgium in the final in straight sets, and losing the final of the 2004 ATP Shanghai to Argentine Guillermo Cañas, also in straight sets. He also reached three doubles finals on the ATP Tour with three different partners. Partnered with Andrew Painter, he lost in the final of the 2000 Grand Prix Hassan II tournament in Casablanca falling in two sets to Frenchmen Sébastien Grosjean and Arnaud Clément. Alongside Jan Vacek he lost his next doubles final at the 2004 Ordina Open in 's-Hertogenbosch, Netherlands in three sets to Czech pairing Martin Damm and Cyril Suk. He would prove victorious in his third and last ATP doubles final appearance at the 2005 Ho Chi Minh City Open in Vietnam, where partnering compatriot Philipp Kohlschreiber he defeated Ashley Fisher and Robert Lindstedt in three sets.

== ATP career finals ==
=== Singles: 2 (1 win, 1 loss) ===
Legend
Grand Slam (0)
ATP Masters Series (0)
ATP Tour (1)

| Result | W/L | Date | Tournament | Surface | Opponent | Score |
|---|---|---|---|---|---|---|
| Win | 1–0 | Feb 2002 | Copenhagen, Denmark | Carpet | (Belgium) Olivier Rochus | 6–3, 6–3 |
| Loss | 1–1 | Sep 2004 | Shanghai, China | Hard | (Argentina) Guillermo Cañas | 0–6, 1–6 |

=== Doubles: 3 (1 win, 2 losses) ===
Legend
Grand Slam (0)
ATP Masters Series (0)
ATP Tour (1)

| Result | W/L | Date | Tournament | Surface | Partner | Opponents | Score |
|---|---|---|---|---|---|---|---|
| Loss | 0–1 | Apr 2000 | Casablanca, Morocco | Clay | (Australia) Andrew Painter | (France) Arnaud Clément (France) Sébastien Grosjean | 6–7^{(4–7)}, 4–6 |
| Loss | 0–2 | Sep 2004 | 's-Hertogenbosch, Netherlands | Grass | (Czech Republic) Jan Vacek | (Czech Republic) Martin Damm (Czech Republic) Cyril Suk | 3–6, 7–6^{(9–7)}, 3–6 |
| Win | 1–2 | Sep 2005 | Ho Chi Minh City, Vietnam | Carpet | (Germany) Philipp Kohlschreiber | (Australia) Ashley Fisher (Sweden) Robert Lindstedt | 5–7, 6–4, 6–2 |

== ATP Challenger and ITF Futures finals ==
=== Singles: 11 (4–7) ===
| Legend (singles) ATP Challenger Tour (4–7) ITF World Tennis Tour (0–0) | Finals by surface Hard (1–2) Clay (0–1) Grass (0–0) Carpet (3–4) |

| Result | W–L | Date | Tournament | Tier | Surface | Opponent | Score |
|---|---|---|---|---|---|---|---|
| Win | 1–0 | Feb 1995 | Lippstadt, Germany | Challenger | Carpet | (Sweden) Jonas Svensson | walkover |
| Loss | 1–1 | Jun 1995 | Weiden, Germany | Challenger | Clay | (Romania) Dinu-Mihai Pescariu | 4–6, 2–6 |
| Loss | 1–2 | Nov 1997 | Portorož, Slovenia | Challenger | Hard | (Bulgaria) Orlin Stanoytchev | 6–1, 6–7, 0–6 |
| Win | 2–2 | Mar 1998 | Magdeburg, Germany | Challenger | Carpet | (Romania) Andrei Pavel | 6–4, 6–3 |
| Win | 3–2 | Aug 2002 | Wrexham, United Kingdom | Challenger | Hard | (Switzerland) Ivo Heuberger | 6–2, 6–7^{(5–7)} 6–4 |
| Win | 4–2 | Nov 2002 | Eckental, Germany | Challenger | Carpet | (Germany) Björn Phau | 7–6^{(7–3)}, 5–7, 6–4 |
| Loss | 4–3 | Apr 2003 | Calabasas, United States | Challenger | Hard | (France) Jérôme Golmard | 3–6, 5–7 |
| Loss | 4–4 | Feb 2004 | Heilbronn, Germany | Challenger | Carpet | (Belgium) Gilles Elseneer | 6–3, 3–6, 6–7^{(5–7)} |
| Loss | 4–5 | Nov 2004 | Aachen, Germany | Challenger | Carpet | (Serbia and Montenegro) Novak Djokovic | 4–6, 6–3, 4–6 |
| Loss | 4–6 | Nov 2004 | Eckental, Germany | Challenger | Carpet | (Germany) Alexander Waske | 5–7, 6–7^{(15–17)} |
| Loss | 4–7 | Jan 2005 | Heilbronn, Germany | Challenger | Carpet | (Czech Republic) Jiří Vaněk | 2–6, 4–6 |

=== Doubles: 11 (2–9) ===
| Legend (doubles) ATP Challenger Tour (2–9) ITF World Tennis Tour (0–0) | Finals by surface Hard (0–2) Clay (0–2) Grass (0–0) Carpet (2–5) |

| Result | W–L | Date | Tournament | Tier | Surface | Partner | Opponents | Score |
|---|---|---|---|---|---|---|---|---|
| Loss | 0–1 | Nov 1997 | Neumünster, Germany | Challenger | Carpet | (Germany) Markus Hantschk | (South Africa) John-Laffnie de Jager (South Africa) Chris Haggard | 3–6, 1–6 |
| Win | 1–1 | Dec 1997 | Wismar, Germany | Challenger | Carpet | (Germany) Michael Kohlmann | (Mexico) Bernardo Martínez (Mexico) Óscar Ortiz | 6–4, 7–6 |
| Win | 2–1 | Nov 1999 | Aachen, Germany | Challenger | Carpet | (Japan) Takao Suzuki | (Spain) Juan Ignacio Carrasco (Spain) Jairo Velasco | 7–6, 6–4 |
| Loss | 2–2 | May 2000 | Edinburgh, United Kingdom | Challenger | Clay | (Czech Republic) Ota Fukárek | (United States) Michael Russell (Spain) Tommy Robredo | 0–6, 2–6 |
| Loss | 2–3 | Nov 2003 | Eckental, Germany | Challenger | Carpet | (Germany) Andreas Tattermusch | (Australia) Stephen Huss (Sweden) Robert Lindstedt | walkover |
| Loss | 2–4 | Feb 2004 | Heilbronn, Germany | Challenger | Carpet | (Denmark) Kenneth Carlsen | (Poland) Mariusz Fyrstenberg (Poland) Marcin Matkowski | 3–6, 3–6 |
| Loss | 2–5 | Nov 2005 | Aachen, Germany | Challenger | Carpet | (Germany) Michael Kohlmann | (United Kingdom) James Auckland (United Kingdom) Jamie Delgado | 6–2, 5–7, 3–6 |
| Loss | 2–6 | Jan 2006 | Nouméa, New Caledonia | Challenger | Hard | (Germany) Denis Gremelmayr | (United States) Alex Bogomolov Jr. (United States) Todd Widom | 6–3, 2–6, [6–10] |
| Loss | 2–7 | Jun 2006 | Ettlingen, Germany | Challenger | Clay | (Germany) Simon Greul | (Greece) Vasilis Mazarakis (Chile) Felipe Parada | 6–3, 1–6, [4–10] |
| Loss | 2–8 | Nov 2006 | Shrewsbury, United Kingdom | Challenger | Hard | (Germany) Mischa Zverev | (Germany) Philipp Marx (Denmark) Frederik Nielsen | 4–6, 4–6 |
| Loss | 2–9 | Jul 2007 | Dublin, Ireland | Challenger | Carpet | (Germany) Mischa Zverev | (India) Rohan Bopanna (Australia) Adam Feeney | 2–6, 2–6 |

== Performance timelines ==
Key
| W | F | SF | QF | #R | RR | Q# | DNQ | A | NH |

(W) winner; (F) finalist; (SF) semifinalist; (QF) quarterfinalist; (#R) rounds 4, 3, 2, 1; (RR) round-robin stage; (Q#) qualification round; (DNQ) did not qualify; (A) absent; (NH) not held; (SR) strike rate (events won / competed); (W–L) win–loss record.

=== Singles ===
| Tournament | 1994 | 1995 | 1996 | 1997 | 1998 | 1999 | 2000 | 2001 | 2002 | 2003 | 2004 | 2005 | 2006 | 2007 | SR | W–L | Win % |
|---|---|---|---|---|---|---|---|---|---|---|---|---|---|---|---|---|---|
Grand Slam tournaments
| Australian Open | Q3 | 2R | Q2 | A | 1R | 1R | Q2 | 3R | 1R | 2R | 1R | 1R | 2R | Q1 | 0 / 9 | 5–9 | 36% |
| French Open | A | Q1 | Q1 | A | Q1 | Q1 | Q2 | 3R | 1R | 2R | 2R | 1R | Q2 | A | 0 / 5 | 4–5 | 44% |
| Wimbledon | A | 1R | A | A | Q2 | A | Q3 | 1R | 1R | 2R | 1R | 2R | Q2 | Q2 | 0 / 6 | 2–6 | 25% |
| US Open | A | A | Q1 | Q2 | Q1 | 2R | 1R | 1R | 1R | 2R | Q1 | 1R | Q1 | Q1 | 0 / 6 | 2–6 | 25% |
| Win–loss | 0–0 | 1–2 | 0–0 | 0–0 | 0–1 | 1–2 | 0–1 | 4–4 | 0–4 | 4–4 | 1–3 | 1–4 | 1–1 | 0–0 | 0 / 26 | 13–26 | 33% |
ATP Tour Masters 1000
| Indian Wells Masters | A | A | A | A | A | A | A | Q2 | Q2 | A | 1R | Q1 | 1R | A | 0 / 2 | 0–2 | 0% |
| Miami Open | A | A | A | A | A | Q1 | Q2 | Q1 | 2R | 1R | 2R | 1R | Q1 | A | 0 / 4 | 2–4 | 33% |
| Monte-Carlo Masters | Q3 | Q1 | Q2 | A | A | A | A | Q1 | A | A | Q1 | Q1 | A | A | 0 / 0 | 0–0 | – |
| Hamburg Masters | Not Masters Series | | | | | | A | 2R | 1R | 2R | 2R | 1R | A | A | 0 / 5 | 3–5 | 38% |
| Italian Open | A | A | A | A | A | A | A | Q2 | Q1 | Q1 | Q1 | Q2 | Q1 | A | 0 / 0 | 0–0 | – |
| Canada Masters | A | A | A | A | A | Q2 | A | A | A | A | A | A | A | A | 0 / 0 | 0–0 | – |
| Cincinnati Masters | A | A | A | A | Q2 | A | A | A | A | A | A | Q1 | A | A | 0 / 0 | 0–0 | – |
| Stuttgart | A | A | A | A | A | A | A | Q2 | Not Held | | | | | | 0 / 0 | 0–0 | – |
| Paris Masters | A | A | A | A | A | A | A | Q2 | A | A | A | A | A | A | 0 / 0 | 0–0 | – |
| Win–loss | 0–0 | 0–0 | 0–0 | 0–0 | 0–0 | 0–0 | 0–0 | 1–1 | 1–2 | 1–2 | 2–3 | 0–2 | 0–1 | 0–0 | 0 / 11 | 5–11 | 31% |

=== Doubles ===
| Tournament | 2000 | 2001 | 2002 | 2003 | 2004 | 2005 | 2006 | 2007 | SR | W–L | Win % |
|---|---|---|---|---|---|---|---|---|---|---|---|
Grand Slam tournaments
| Australian Open | A | 1R | A | 1R | 1R | 1R | 1R | A | 0 / 5 | 0–5 | 0% |
| French Open | A | A | A | A | A | A | A | A | 0 / 0 | 0–0 | – |
| Wimbledon | Q2 | A | A | A | A | A | 2R | 1R | 0 / 2 | 1–2 | 33% |
| US Open | 1R | A | A | A | A | 3R | 2R | A | 0 / 3 | 3–3 | 50% |
| Win–loss | 0–1 | 0–1 | 0–0 | 0–1 | 0–1 | 2–2 | 2–3 | 0–1 | 0 / 10 | 4–10 | 29% |
