= 1997 Croatian Indoors – Singles =

Singles
- 1997 Croatian Indoors

Final
- Champion: (Croatia) Goran Ivanišević
- Runner-up: (United Kingdom) Greg Rusedski
- Score: 7–6^{(7–4)}, 4–6, 7–6^{(8–6)}

Details
- Draw: 32
- Seeds: 8

Events
Singles	Doubles
← 1996 ·	Croatian Indoors	· 1998 →

Goran Ivanišević was the defending champion and won in the final 7–6^{(7–4)}, 4–6, 7–6^{(8–6)} against Greg Rusedski.

== Seeds ==
1. (Croatia) Goran Ivanišević (champion)
2. (Sweden) Thomas Enqvist (semifinals)
3. (Netherlands) Jan Siemerink (second round)
4. (Switzerland) Marc Rosset (second round)
5. (Spain) Javier Sánchez (semifinals)
6. (Italy) Renzo Furlan (second round)
7. (Germany) David Prinosil (second round)
8. (Germany) Hendrik Dreekmann (first round)

== Draw ==
=== Key ===
- Q = Qualifier
- WC = Wild card
- LL = Lucky loser
- Alt = Alternate
- ITF = ITF entry
- PR = Protected ranking
- SR = Special ranking
- SE = Special exempt
- JE = Junior exempt
- JR = Junior Accelerator Programme entrant
- CO = College Accelerator Programme entrant
- NG = Next Gen Accelerator Program entrant
- w/o = Walkover
- r = Retired
- d = Defaulted

=== Finals ===
Semifinals
1	(Croatia) Goran Ivanišević	6	6
5	(Spain) Javier Sánchez	2	4
(United Kingdom) Greg Rusedski	6	6
2	(Sweden) Thomas Enqvist	4	4

Final
1	(Croatia) Goran Ivanišević	7^{7}	4	7^{8}
(United Kingdom) Greg Rusedski	6^{4}	6	6^{6}

=== Top half ===
First round
1	(Croatia) G Ivanišević	7^{7}	6^{4}	7
(Sweden) M Norman	6^{5}	7^{7}	5
(Germany) M-K Goellner	5	2
(Sweden) T Johansson	7	6
(Romania) A Voinea	7^{7}	6
(Spain) M A Gorriz	6^{2}	3
(Germany) A Rădulescu	7^{9}	6
8	(Germany) H Dreekmann	6^{7}	2
4	(Switzerland) M Rosset	2	7^{7}	6
Q	(Hungary) J Krocsko	6	6^{4}	2
WC	(Croatia) S Hiršzon	5	6^{9}
Q	(Argentina) G Etlis	7	7^{11}
(Slovakia) D Hrbatý	1	3
(Austria) G Schaller	6	6
(Spain) J A Viloca	6^{6}	6^{5}
5	(Spain) J Sánchez	7^{8}	7^{7}

Second round
1	(Croatia) G Ivanišević	7^{7}	6
(Sweden) T Johansson	6^{4}	4
(Romania) A Voinea	6^{7}	6^{5}
(Germany) A Rădulescu	7^{9}	7^{7}
4	(Switzerland) M Rosset	3	6^{1}
Q	(Argentina) G Etlis	6	7^{7}
(Austria) G Schaller	3	5
5	(Spain) J Sánchez	6	7

Quarterfinals
1	(Croatia) G Ivanišević	6	1
(Germany) A Rădulescu	0	1^{r}
Q	(Argentina) G Etlis	0	6^{5}
5	(Spain) J Sánchez	6	7^{7}

Semifinals
1	(Croatia) G Ivanišević	6	6
5	(Spain) J Sánchez	2	4

=== Bottom half ===
First round
6	(Italy) R Furlan	3	7^{7}	6
(Argentina) J Frana	6	6^{4}	4
(Denmark) K Carlsen	7^{8}	6^{7}	6^{3}
(Czech Republic) M Damm	6^{6}	7^{9}	7^{7}
Q	(United States) F Montana	3	4
(United Kingdom) G Rusedski	6	6
Q	(Czech Republic) R Vašek	3	7	4
WC/3	(Netherlands) J Siemerink	6	5	6
7	(Germany) D Prinosil	6^{5}	6	6
WC	(Croatia) I Ljubičić	7^{7}	3	0
(Morocco) H Arazi	2	6	6
(Spain) T Carbonell	6	1	4
(Morocco) K Alami	7^{8}	1	6
(Russia) A Chesnokov	6^{6}	6	1
(Sweden) P Fredriksson	7^{7}	3	3
2	(Sweden) T Enqvist	6^{1}	6	6

Second round
6	(Italy) R Furlan	3	5
(Czech Republic) M Damm	6	7
(United Kingdom) G Rusedski	4	6	6
WC/3	(Netherlands) J Siemerink	6	3	2
7	(Germany) D Prinosil	6^{5}	3
(Morocco) H Arazi	7^{7}	6
(Morocco) K Alami	3	0
2	(Sweden) T Enqvist	6	6

Quarterfinals
(Czech Republic) M Damm	5	3
(United Kingdom) G Rusedski	7	6
(Morocco) H Arazi	2	3
2	(Sweden) T Enqvist	6	6

Semifinals
(United Kingdom) G Rusedski	6	6
2	(Sweden) T Enqvist	4	4
