= 1998 Croatian Indoors – Doubles =

Doubles
- 1998 Croatian Indoors

Final
- Champions: (Czech Republic) Martin Damm (Czech Republic) Jiří Novák
- Runners-up: (Sweden) Fredrik Bergh (Sweden) Patrik Fredriksson
- Score: 7–6, 6–2

Details
- Draw: 16
- Seeds: 4

Events
Singles	Doubles
- Croatian Indoors

The 1998 Croatian Indoors was a men's tennis tournament played on carpet courts in Split, Croatia, that was part of the International Series of the 1998 ATP Tour. It was the only edition of the tournament and was held 2–9 February 1998.

== Seeds ==
Champion seeds are indicated in bold text while text in italics indicates the round in which those seeds were eliminated.

1. Unknown (withdrew)
2. (Czech Republic) Pavel Vízner / (Netherlands) Fernon Wibier (first round)
3. (Netherlands) Tom Kempers / (Netherlands) Menno Oosting (semifinals)
4. (United States) Kent Kinnear / (North Macedonia) Aleksandar Kitinov (first round)

== Draw ==
Key

- Q = Qualifier
- WC = Wild card
- LL = Lucky loser
- Alt = Alternate
- ITF = ITF entry
- PR = Protected ranking
- SR = Special ranking
- SE = Special exempt
- JE = Junior exempt
- JR = Junior Accelerator Programme entrant
- CO = College Accelerator Programme entrant
- NG = Next Gen Accelerator Program entrant
- w/o = Walkover
- r = Retired
- d = Defaulted

=== Draw ===
First round
(Czechoslovakia) **M Damm** **(Czech Republic) J Novák**	**7**	**6**
(Croatia) J Dumanic (Croatia) I Karlović	6	3
(Hungary) **G Köves** **(Czech Republic) R Vašek**	1	**7**	**6**
(Netherlands) S Noteboom (Netherlands) J Siemerink	**6**	6	2
3	(Netherlands) **Kempers** **(Netherlands) M Oosting**	**7**	**6**
(Spain) E Benfele Álvarez (Spain) Á Calatrava	6	3
(Germany) **J Knippschild** **(Czech Republic) T Anzari**	**6**	**7**
(Croatia) M Tudor (Croatia) I Vajda	3	6
(Romania) **D Pescariu** **(Italy) D Sanguinetti**	**6**	**7**
(Croatia) I Ančić (Croatia) I Ljubičić	3	6
(Germany) **B Becker** **(Germany) D Prinosil**	**7**	**7**
4	(United States) K Kinnear (North Macedonia) A Kitinov	5	6
(Croatia) **S Hiršzon** **(Croatia) G Ivanišević**	**6**	**6**
(Netherlands) S Groen (Switzerland) M Rosset	3	4
(Sweden) **F Bergh** **(Sweden) P Fredrksson**	**6**	**6**
2	(Czech Republic) P Vízner (Netherlands) F Wibier	2	4

Quarterfinals
(Czechoslovakia) **M Damm** **(Czech Republic) J Novák**	**6**	**6**
(Hungary) G Köves (Czech Republic) R Vašek	2	4
3	(Netherlands) **T Kempers** **(Netherlands) M Oosting**	**7**	**7**
(Germany) J Knippschild (Czech Republic) T Anzari	6	6
(Romania) D Pescariu (Italy) D Sanguinetti	5	5
(Germany) **B Becker** **(Germany) D Prinosil**	**7**	**7**
(Croatia) S Hiršzon (Croatia) G Ivanišević	5	6
(Sweden) **F Bergh** **(Sweden) P Fredrksson**	**7**	**7**

Semifinals
(Czechoslovakia) **M Damm** **(Czech Republic) J Novák**	**7**	**6**
3	(Netherlands) T Kempers (Netherlands) M Oosting	5	4
(Germany) B Becker (Germany) D Prinosil	5	**7**	3
(Sweden) **F Bergh** **(Sweden) P Fredrksson**	**7**	6	**6**

Final
(Czechoslovakia) **M Damm** **(Czech Republic) J Novák**	**7**	**6**
(Sweden) F Bergh (Sweden) P Fredrksson	6	2
