= 1998 Croatian Indoors =

- Date: 2–9 February
- Category: World Series
- Draw: 32S / 16D
- Prize money: $375,000
- Surface: Carpet / indoor
- Location: Split, Croatia

Champions

Singles
- (Croatia) Goran Ivanišević

Doubles
- (Czech Republic) Martin Damm / (Czech Republic) Jiří Novák
- Croatian Indoors

The 1998 Croatian Indoors was a men's tennis tournament played on indoor carpet courts in Split, Croatia, that was part of the World Series of the 1998 ATP Tour. It was the only edition of the tournament and was held from 2 February to 9 February 1998. Second-seeded Goran Ivanišević won the singles title.

== Finals ==
=== Singles ===
(Croatia) Goran Ivanišević defeated (United Kingdom) Greg Rusedski, 7–6^{(7–3)}, 7–6^{(7–5)}

- It was Ivanišević's only singles title of the year and the 21st of his career.

=== Doubles ===
(Czech Republic) Martin Damm / (Czech Republic) Jiří Novák defeated (Sweden) Fredrik Bergh / (Sweden) Patrik Fredriksson, 7–6, 6–2
