= 1997 Croatian Indoors – Doubles =

Doubles
- 1997 Croatian Indoors

Final
- Champions: (Croatia) Saša Hiršzon (Croatia) Goran Ivanišević
- Runners-up: (South Africa) Brent Haygarth (United States) Mark Keil
- Score: 6–4, 6–3

Details
- Draw: 16
- Seeds: 4

Events
Singles	Doubles
- Croatian Indoors

Menno Oosting and Libor Pimek were the defending champions but they competed with different partners that year, Oosting with David Adams and Pimek with Peter Nyborg.

Adams and Oosting lost in the first round to Patrik Fredriksson and Kenny Thorne, as did Nyborg and Pimek to Saša Hiršzon and Goran Ivanišević.

Hirszon and Ivanišević won in the final 6–4, 6–3 against Brent Haygarth and Mark Keil.

== Seeds ==
1. (South Africa) David Adams / (Netherlands) Menno Oosting (first round)
2. (Sweden) Peter Nyborg / (Belgium) Libor Pimek (first round)
3. (Netherlands) Sjeng Schalken / (Netherlands) Jan Siemerink (semifinals)
4. (United States) Donald Johnson / (United States) Francisco Montana (first round)

== Draw ==
Key

- Q = Qualifier
- WC = Wild card
- LL = Lucky loser
- Alt = Alternate
- ITF = ITF entry
- PR = Protected ranking
- SR = Special ranking
- SE = Special exempt
- JE = Junior exempt
- JR = Junior Accelerator Programme entrant
- CO = College Accelerator Programme entrant
- NG = Next Gen Accelerator Program entrant
- w/o = Walkover
- r = Retired
- d = Defaulted

First round
1	(South Africa) D Adams (Netherlands) M Oosting	2	6
Q	(Sweden) P Fredriksson (United States) K Thorne	6	7
WC	(Croatia) I Ančić (Croatia) I Karlović	6	2	6
(South Africa) B Haygarth (United States) M Keil	2	6	7
3	(Netherlands) S Schalken (Netherlands) J Siemerink	6	6
(Netherlands) T Kempers (Netherlands) T Nijssen	4	4
WC	(Croatia) G Orešić (Croatia) M Tudor	6	6
WC	(Croatia) J Dumanic (Croatia) I Saric	2	1
(Netherlands) S Noteboom (Netherlands) F Wibier	7	6
(Italy) C Brandi (North Macedonia) A Kitinov	6	4
(Spain) T Carbonell (Argentina) J Frana	6	6
4	(United States) D Johnson (United States) F Montana	3	2
(Spain) J A Conde (Spain) J Sánchez	3	5
(South Africa) M Barnard (Netherlands) H J Davids	6	7
(Croatia) S Hiršzon (Croatia) G Ivanišević	6	7	6
2	(Sweden) P Nyborg (Belgium) L Pimek	7	6	4

Quarterfinals
Q	(Sweden) P Fredriksson (United States) K Thorne	3	4
(South Africa) B Haygarth (United States) M Keil	6	6
3	(Netherlands) S Schalken (Netherlands) J Siemerink	6	7
WC	(Croatia) G Orešić (Croatia) M Tudor	2	5
(Netherlands) S Noteboom (Netherlands) F Wibier	7	3	6
(Spain) T Carbonell (Argentina) J Frana	6	6	3
(South Africa) M Barnard (Netherlands) H J Davids	4	6
(Croatia) S Hiršzon (Croatia) G Ivanišević	6	7

Semifinals
(South Africa) B Haygarth (United States) M Keil	6	7
3	(Netherlands) S Schalken (Netherlands) J Siemerink	3	6
(Netherlands) S Noteboom (Netherlands) F Wibier	4	4
(Croatia) S Hiršzon (Croatia) G Ivanišević	6	6

Final
(South Africa) B Haygarth (United States) M Keil	4	3
(Croatia) S Hiršzon (Croatia) G Ivanišević	6	6
