= 1998 Croatian Indoors – Singles =

Singles
- 1998 Croatian Indoors

Final
- Champion: (Croatia) Goran Ivanišević
- Runner-up: (United Kingdom) Greg Rusedski
- Score: 7–6^{(7–3)}, 7–6^{(7–5)}

Details
- Draw: 32
- Seeds: 8

Events
Singles	Doubles
- Croatian Indoors

The 1998 Croatian Indoors was a men's tennis tournament played on indoor carpet courts in Split, Croatia, that was part of the International Series of the 1998 ATP Tour. It was the only edition of the tournament and was held 2–9 February 1998.

== Seeds ==
Champion seeds are indicated in bold text while text in italics indicates the round in which those seeds were eliminated.

1. (United Kingdom) Greg Rusedski (final)
2. (Croatia) **Goran Ivanišević (champion)**
3. (United Kingdom) Tim Henman (first round)
4. (Ukraine) Andrei Medvedev (second round)
5. (Switzerland) Marc Rosset (semifinals)
6. (Sweden) Thomas Johansson (first round)
7. (Czech Republic) Jiří Novák (quarterfinals)
8. (Spain) Javier Sánchez (first round)

== Draw ==
Key

- Q = Qualifier
- WC = Wild card
- LL = Lucky loser
- Alt = Alternate
- ITF = ITF entry
- PR = Protected ranking
- SR = Special ranking
- SE = Special exempt
- JE = Junior exempt
- JR = Junior Accelerator Programme entrant
- CO = College Accelerator Programme entrant
- NG = Next Gen Accelerator Program entrant
- w/o = Walkover
- r = Retired
- d = Defaulted

=== Finals ===
Semifinals
1/WC	**(United Kingdom) Greg Rusedski**	6^{3}	**7^{7}**	**7^{7}**
5	(Switzerland) Marc Rosset	**7^{7}**	6^{5}	6^{5}
(Germany) Martin Sinner	3	6^{3}
2	**(Croatia) Goran Ivanišević**	**6**	**7^{7}**

Final
1/WC	(United Kingdom) Greg Rusedski	6^{3}	6^{5}
2	**(Croatia) Goran Ivanišević**	**7^{7}**	**7^{7}**

=== Top half ===
First round
1/WC	**(United Kingdom) G Rusedski**	**6**	**6**
(Italy) G Pozzi	3	4
(Costa Rica) JA Marín	5	3
**(Slovakia) J Krošlák**	**7**	**6**
**(Netherlands) J Siemerink**	**7^{7}**	**6**
Q	(Sweden) P Fredriksson	6^{4}	1
**(Czech Republic) M Damm**	**6**	**7^{7}**
8	(Spain) J Sánchez	3	6^{1}
3/WC	(United Kingdom) T Henman	3	**6**	3
**(Germany) R Schüttler**	**6**	1	**6**
Q	(Romania) I Moldovan	4	4
Q	**(Russia) A Merinov**	**6**	**6**
(Romania) D Pescariu	4	4
**(Czech Republic) R Vašek**	**6**	**6**
(Italy) R Furlan	**6**	2	3
5	**(Switzerland) M Rosset**	3	**6**	**6**

Second round
1/WC	**(United Kingdom) G Rusedski**	**6**	**6**
(Slovakia) J Krošlák	4	3
(Netherlands) J Siemerink	4	3
**(Czech Republic) M Damm**	**6**	**6**
**(Germany) R Schüttler**	**6**	**6**
Q	(Russia) A Merinov	1	0
(Czech Republic) R Vašek	3	1
5	**(Switzerland) M Rosset**	**6**	**6**

Quarterfinals
1/WC	**(United Kingdom) G Rusedski**	**6**	**6**
(Czech Republic) M Damm	1	4
(Germany) R Schüttler	2	2
5	**(Switzerland) M Rosset**	**6**	**6**

Semifinals
1/WC	**(United Kingdom) G Rusedski**	6^{3}	**7^{7}**	**7^{7}**
5	(Switzerland) M Rosset	**7^{7}**	6^{5}	6^{5}

=== Bottom half ===
First round
6	(Sweden) T Johansson	6^{5}	4
(Germany) M Sinner	**7^{7}**	**6**
(Germany) A Rădulescu	**6**	4^{r}
**(Italy) D Sanguinetti**	1	4
(Germany) H Dreekmann	2	**6**	1
**(Denmark) K Carlsen**	**6**	3	**6**
(Spain) Á Calatrava	**7^{7}**	6^{9}	3
4/WC	**(Ukraine) A Medvedev**	6^{5}	**7^{11}**	**6**
7	**(Czech Republic) J Novák**	**6**	6^{7}	**7**
(Germany) J Knippschild	3	**7^{9}**	5
**(Spain) E Benfele Álvarez**	**6**	**6**
(Spain) F Vicente	4	2
Q	(Sweden) F Bergh	3	6^{5}
**(Germany) B Becker**	**6**	**7^{7}**
(Germany) D Prinosil	6^{6}	4
2	**(Croatia) G Ivanišević**	**7^{8}**	**6**

Second round
**(Germany) M Sinner**	**6**	3	**6**
(Italy) D Sanguinetti	2	**6**	3
**(Denmark) K Carlsen**	**6**	3	**6**
4	(Ukraine) A Medvedev	2	**6**	1
7	**(Czech Republic) J Novák**	**6**	**7**
(Spain) E Benfele Álvarez	1	5
(Germany) B Becker	6^{6}	**7^{9}**	4
2	**(Croatia) G Ivanišević**	**7^{8}**	6^{7}	**6**

Quarterfinals
**(Germany) M Sinner**	5	**6**	**7^{7}**
(Denmark) K Carlsen	**7**	3	6^{0}
7	(Czech Republic) J Novák	6^{5}	6^{9}
2	**(Croatia) G Ivanišević**	**7^{7}**	**7^{11}**

Semifinals
(Germany) M Sinner	3	6^{3}
2	**(Croatia) G Ivanišević**	**6**	**7^{7}**

Qualifying Draw
