= 1997 Croatian Indoors =

- Date: 27 January – 2 February
- Edition: 2nd
- Category: World Series
- Draw: 32S / 16D
- Prize money: $375,000
- Surface: Carpet / indoor
- Location: Zagreb, Croatia
- Venue: Dom Sportova

Champions

Singles
- (Croatia) Goran Ivanišević

Doubles
- (Croatia) Saša Hiršzon / (Croatia) Goran Ivanišević
- Croatian Indoors

The 1997 Croatian Indoors was a men's tennis tournament played on indoor carpet courts at the Dom Sportova in Zagreb in Croatia and was part of the World Series of the 1997 ATP Tour. It was the second edition of the tournament and took place from 27 January through February 1997. First-seeded Goran Ivanišević won his second consecutive singles title at the event.

== Finals ==
=== Singles ===
(Croatia) Goran Ivanišević defeated (United Kingdom) Greg Rusedski 7–6^{(7–4)}, 4–6, 7–6^{(8–6)}

- It was Ivanišević's 1st singles title of the year and the 18th of his career.

=== Doubles ===
(Croatia) Saša Hiršzon / (Croatia) Goran Ivanišević defeated (South Africa) Brent Haygarth / (United States) Mark Keil 6–4, 6–3

- It was Hirszon's only title of the year and the 2nd of his career. It was Ivanišević's 2nd title of the year and the 26th of his career.
