= 2000 French Open – Men's doubles =

Men's doubles
- 2000 French Open

Final
- Champion: (Australia) Todd Woodbridge (Australia) Mark Woodforde
- Runner-up: (Netherlands) Paul Haarhuis (Australia) Sandon Stolle
- Score: 7–6^{(9–7)}, 6–4

Details
- Draw: 64
- Seeds: 16

Events
Singles	men	women		boys	girls
Doubles	men	women	mixed	boys	girls
WC Singles	men	women	quad
WC Doubles	men	women	quad
Legends	−45	45+	women
← 1999 ·	French Open	· 2001 →

Todd Woodbridge and Mark Woodforde defeated Paul Haarhuis and Sandon Stolle in the final, 7–6^{(9–7)}, 6–4 to win the men's doubles tennis title at the 2000 French Open. With the win, the Woodies completed the career Grand Slam and the career Super Slam.

Mahesh Bhupathi and Leander Paes were the defending champions, but competed with different partners. Bhupathi played alongside David Prinosil, but lost to Juan Ignacio Carrasco and Jairo Velasco Jr. in the second round. Paes played alongside Jan Siemerink, but lost to Guy Forget and Guillaume Raoux in the first round.

== Seeds ==
Champion seeds are indicated in bold text while text in italics indicates the round in which those seeds were eliminated.

1. (United States) Alex O'Brien / (United States) Jared Palmer (first round)
2. (Australia) **Todd Woodbridge** / (Australia) **Mark Woodforde (champions)**
3. (Netherlands) Paul Haarhuis / (Australia) Sandon Stolle (final)
4. (South Africa) Ellis Ferreira / (United States) Rick Leach (first round)
5. (Sweden) Jonas Björkman / (Zimbabwe) Byron Black (second round)
6. (South Africa) David Adams / (South Africa) John-Laffnie de Jager (first round)
7. (South Africa) Wayne Ferreira / (Russia) Yevgeny Kafelnikov (quarterfinals)
8. (Czech Republic) Jiří Novák / (Czech Republic) David Rikl (quarterfinals)
9. (India) Mahesh Bhupathi / (Germany) David Prinosil (second round)
10. Unknown (withdrew)
11. (Zimbabwe) Wayne Black / (Australia) Andrew Kratzmann (second round)
12. (United States) Justin Gimelstob / (The Bahamas) Mark Knowles (first round)
13. (Canada) Sébastien Lareau / (Canada) Daniel Nestor (quarterfinals)
14. (Sweden) Nicklas Kulti / (Sweden) Mikael Tillström (third round)
15. (France) Olivier Delaître / (United States) Jeff Tarango (first round)
16. (South Africa) Piet Norval / (Zimbabwe) Kevin Ullyett (third round)

== Draw ==
=== Key ===
- Q = Qualifier
- WC = Wild card
- LL = Lucky loser
- Alt = Alternate
- ITF = ITF entry
- PR = Protected ranking
- SR = Special ranking
- SE = Special exempt
- JE = Junior exempt
- JR = Junior Accelerator Programme entrant
- CO = College Accelerator Programme entrant
- NG = Next Gen Accelerator Program entrant
- w/o = Walkover
- r = Retired
- d = Defaulted

=== Finals ===
Quarterfinals
(Spain) **Tomás Carbonell** **(Argentina) Martín García**	5	**6**	**7**
7	(South Africa) Wayne Ferreira (Russia) Yevgeny Kafelnikov	**7**	4	5
3	(Netherlands) **Paul Haarhuis** **(Australia) Sandon Stolle**	**6**	**6**
(South Africa) Neville Godwin (Australia) Michael Hill	3	4
(Brazil) **Jaime Oncins** **(Argentina) Daniel Orsanic**	**6**	4	**6**
13	(Canada) Sébastien Lareau (Canada) Daniel Nestor	4	**6**	2
8	(Czech Republic) Jiří Novák (Czech Republic) David Rikl	**6**	6^{6}	1
2	(Australia) **Todd Woodbridge** **(Australia) Mark Woodforde**	3	**7**	**6**

Semifinals
(Spain) Tomás Carbonell (Argentina) Martín García	4	4
3	(Netherlands) **Paul Haarhuis** **(Australia) Sandon Stolle**	**6**	**6**
(Brazil) Jaime Oncins (Argentina) Daniel Orsanic	4	6^{8}
2	(Australia) **Todd Woodbridge** **(Australia) Mark Woodforde**	**6**	**7**

Final
3	(Netherlands) Paul Haarhuis (Australia) Sandon Stolle	6^{7}	4
2	(Australia) **Todd Woodbridge** **(Australia) Mark Woodforde**	**7**	**6**

=== Top half ===
==== Section 1 ====
First round
(Spain) **T Carbonell** **(Argentina) M García**	**6**	**6**
1	(United States) A O'Brien (United States) J Palmer	2	4
(Czech Republic) **P Pála** **(Czech Republic) P Vízner**	**6**	**6**
(Spain) E Benfele Álvarez (Socialist Federal Republic of Yugoslavia) D Vemić	2	4
(Australia) **L Hewitt** **(Australia) P Rafter**	**6**	5	**6**
(France) A Clément (France) S Grosjean	1	**7**	2
16	(South Africa) **P Norval** **(Zimbabwe) K Ullyett**	**6**	3	**6**
(Belarus) M Mirnyi (Socialist Federal Republic of Yugoslavia) N Zimonjić	3	**6**	4
9	(India) **M Bhupathi** **(Germany) D Prinosil**	**6**	**7**
(Australia) W Arthurs (Australia) M Tebbutt	4	5
(Spain) **JI Carrasco** **(Spain) J Velasco Jr.**	**7**	**6**
(Canada) J Robichaud (United States) J Waite	6^{8}	2
(France) **S Huet** **(France) C Saulnier**	**6**	6^{4}	**6**
(Spain) A Martín (Czech Republic) C Suk	3	**7**	1
7	(South Africa) **W Ferreira** **(Russia) Y Kafelnikov**	4	**6**	**7**
(United States) J-M Gambill (United States) S Humphries	**6**	4	5

Second round
(Spain) **T Carbonell** **(Argentina) M García**	**7**	4	**6**
(Czech Republic) P Pála (Czech Republic) P Vízner	5	**6**	1
(Australia) L Hewitt (Australia) P Rafter
16	(South Africa) **P Norval** **(Zimbabwe) K Ullyett**	w/o
9	(India) M Bhupathi (Germany) D Prinosil	4	**7**	1
(Spain) **JI Carrasco** **(Spain) J Velasco Jr.**	**6**	6^{4}	**6**
(France) S Huet (France) C Saulnier	**6**	4	5
7	(South Africa) **W Ferreira** **(Russia) Y Kafelnikov**	4	**6**	**7**

Third round
(Spain) **T Carbonell** **(Argentina) M García**	**7**	**6**
16	(South Africa) P Norval (Zimbabwe) K Ullyett	5	3
(Spain) JI Carrasco (Spain) J Velasco Jr.	2	3
7	(South Africa) **W Ferreira** **(Russia) Y Kafelnikov**	**6**	**6**

Quarterfinals
(Spain) **T Carbonell** **(Argentina) M García**	5	**6**	**7**
7	(South Africa) W Ferreira (Russia) Y Kafelnikov	**7**	4	5

==== Section 2 ====
First round
3	(Netherlands) **P Haarhuis** **(Australia) S Stolle**	4	**7**	**6**
(Germany) M-K Goellner (Philippines) E Taino	**6**	5	3
(Australia) **P Kilderry** **(Australia) P Tramacchi**	**6**	**6**
(United States) D Bowen (United States) B Coupe	3	2
(France) **J Benneteau** **(France) N Mahut**	**6**	**6**
(France) T Guardiola (France) É Prodon	1	2
14	(Sweden) **N Kulti** **(Sweden) M Tillström**	**6**	**6**
(Spain) Á López Morón (Spain) A Portas	2	2
11	(Zimbabwe) **W Black** **(Australia) A Kratzmann**	**6**	**6**
(Australia) N Ellwood (Brazil) A Prieto	4	4
(South Africa) **N Godwin** **(Australia) M Hill**	**6**	4	**6**
(Sweden) S Aspelin (Sweden) J Landsberg	4	**6**	2
(Spain) **J Balcells** **(Croatia) G Ivanišević**	**6**	**6**
(France) A Di Pasquale (France) R Gilbert	3	4
(Australia) **J Eagle** **(Australia) A Florent**	**6**	**6**
6	(South Africa) D Adams (South Africa) J-L de Jager	1	3

Second round
3	(Netherlands) **P Haarhuis** **(Australia) S Stolle**	4	**6**	**6**
(Australia) P Kilderry (Australia) P Tramacchi	**6**	3	4
(France) J Benneteau (France) N Mahut	2	5
14	(Sweden) **N Kulti** **(Sweden) M Tillström**	**6**	**7**
11	(Zimbabwe) W Black (Australia) A Kratzmann	3	**6**	2
(South Africa) **N Godwin** **(Australia) M Hill**	**6**	3	**6**
(Spain) J Balcells (Croatia) G Ivanišević	**6**	4	4
(Australia) **J Eagle** **(Australia) A Florent**	4	**6**	**6**

Third round
3	(Netherlands) **P Haarhuis** **(Australia) S Stolle**	**6**	**7**
14	(Sweden) N Kulti (Sweden) M Tillström	3	6^{5}
(South Africa) **N Godwin** **(Australia) M Hill**	6^{5}	**6**	**6**
(Australia) J Eagle (Australia) A Florent	**7**	2	4

Quarterfinals
3	(Netherlands) **P Haarhuis** **(Australia) S Stolle**	**6**	**6**
(South Africa) N Godwin (Australia) M Hill	3	4

=== Bottom half ===
==== Section 3 ====
First round
5	(Sweden) **J Björkman** **(Zimbabwe) B Black**	**7**	**6**
(France) M Llodra (Italy) D Nargiso	6^{5}	2
(Brazil) **J Oncins** **(Argentina) D Orsanic**	**7**	**6**
(Argentina) M Hood (Argentina) S Prieto	5	4
(France) **J Boutter** **(France) F Santoro**	**7**	4	**6**
(United States) P Goldstein (United States) J Stark	6^{8}	**6**	2
(Monaco) **J-R Lisnard** **(France) O Patience**	**6**	**6**
12	(United States) J Gimelstob (The Bahamas) M Knowles	4	4
13	(Canada) **S Lareau** **(Canada) D Nestor**	**6**	**6**
(France) N Escudé (Switzerland) R Federer	4	3
(United States) **M Bryan** **(United States) B Bryan**	**6**	**6**
(United States) P Galbraith (United States) B MacPhie	3	4
(Argentina) **P Albano** **(South Africa) C Haggard**	**6**	5	**6**
(Portugal) N Marques (Belgium) T Vanhoudt	4	**7**	2
(Argentina) **G Etlis** **(Argentina) M Rodríguez**	3	**6**	**6**
4	(South Africa) E Ferreira (United States) R Leach	**6**	3	4

Second round
5	(Sweden) J Björkman (Zimbabwe) B Black	**7**	0	9
5	(Brazil) **J Oncins** **(Argentina) D Orsanic**	6^{5}	**6**	**11**
(France) **J Boutter** **(France) F Santoro**	**7**	**6**
(Monaco) J-R Lisnard (France) O Patience	6^{6}	1
13	(Canada) **S Lareau** **(Canada) D Nestor**	**6**	**6**
(United States) M Bryan (United States) B Bryan	2	4
(Argentina) P Albano (South Africa) C Haggard	4	2
(Argentina) **G Etlis** **(Argentina) M Rodríguez**	**6**	**6**

Third round
(Brazil) **J Oncins** **(Argentina) D Orsanic**	**7**	**6**
(France) J Boutter (France) F Santoro	6^{8}	2
13	(Canada) **S Lareau** **(Canada) D Nestor**	4	**6**	**8**
(Argentina) G Etlis (Argentina) M Rodríguez	**6**	1	6

Quarterfinals
(Brazil) **J Oncins** **(Argentina) D Orsanic**	**6**	4	**6**
13	(Canada) S Lareau (Canada) D Nestor	4	**6**	2

==== Section 4 ====
First round
8	(Czech Republic) **J Novák** **(Czech Republic) D Rikl**	**6**	**6**
(Sweden) F Bergh (North Macedonia) A Kitinov	4	3
(Australia) **D Macpherson** **(Sweden) P Nyborg**	**6**	**7**
(Spain) E Nicolás (Spain) G Puentes	1	6^{5}
(France) **G Forget** **(France) G Raoux**	**7**	**6**
(India) L Paes (Netherlands) J Siemerink	6^{5}	3
(Czech Republic) **M Damm** **(Slovakia) D Hrbatý**	**6**	**6**
(South Africa) J Coetzee (South Africa) B Haygarth	1	4
(Japan) **T Shimada** **(South Africa) M Wakefield**	**6**	2	**8**
15	(France) O Delaître (United States) J Tarango	4	**6**	6
(South Africa) **M Barnard** **(United States) F Montana**	**6**	**6**
(Argentina) D del Río (Israel) E Ran	2	3
(Argentina) **L Arnold** **(United States) D Johnson**	4	**6**	**6**
(Italy) M Bertolini (Italy) C Brandi	**6**	3	4
2	(Australia) **T Woodbridge** **(Australia) M Woodforde**	**6**	**6**
(South Africa) L Bale (South Africa) M Ondruska	4	3

Second round
8	(Czech Republic) **J Novák** **(Czech Republic) D Rikl**	**6**	**6**
(Australia) D Macpherson (Sweden) P Nyborg	3	3
(France) G Forget (France) G Raoux	5	4
(Czech Republic) **M Damm** **(Slovakia) D Hrbatý**	**7**	**6**
(Japan) T Shimada (South Africa) M Wakefield	4	2
(South Africa) **M Barnard** **(United States) F Montana**	**6**	**6**
(Argentina) L Arnold (United States) D Johnson	2	**6**	2
2	(Australia) **T Woodbridge** **(Australia) M Woodforde**	**6**	4	**6**

Third round
8	(Czech Republic) **J Novák** **(Czech Republic) D Rikl**	**6**	4	**6**
(Czech Republic) M Damm (Slovakia) D Hrbatý	1	**6**	3
(South Africa) M Barnard (United States) F Montana	4	2
2	(Australia) **T Woodbridge** **(Australia) M Woodforde**	**6**	**6**

Quarterfinals
8	(Czech Republic) J Novák (Czech Republic) D Rikl	**6**	6^{6}	1
2	(Australia) **T Woodbridge** **(Australia) M Woodforde**	3	**7**	**6**
