= 2000 French Open – Women's doubles =

Tennis tournament

Women's doubles
- 2000 French Open

Final
- Champions: (Switzerland) Martina Hingis (France) Mary Pierce
- Runners-up: (Spain) Virginia Ruano Pascual (Argentina) Paola Suárez
- Score: 6–2, 6–4

Details
- Draw: 64 (4 WC )
- Seeds: 16

Events
Singles	men	women		boys	girls
Doubles	men	women	mixed	boys	girls
WC Singles	men	women	quad
WC Doubles	men	women	quad
Legends	−45	45+	women
← 1999 ·	French Open	· 2001 →

Martina Hingis and Mary Pierce defeated Virginia Ruano Pascual and Paola Suárez in the final, 6–2, 6–4 to win the women's doubles tennis title at the 2000 French Open. Pierce became the first Frenchwoman to win the title since Gail Sherriff Chanfreau Lovera won with Fiorella Bonicelli in 1976.

Serena Williams and Venus Williams were the reigning champions, but did not compete this year.

== Seeds ==
1. (United States) Lindsay Davenport / (United States) Corina Morariu (withdrew)
2. (United States) Lisa Raymond / (Australia) Rennae Stubbs (third round)
3. (Switzerland) Martina Hingis / (France) Mary Pierce (champions)
4. (Russia) Anna Kournikova / (Belarus) Natasha Zvereva (third round)
5. (France) Julie Halard-Decugis / (Japan) Ai Sugiyama (semifinals)
6. (France) Alexandra Fusai / (France) Nathalie Tauziat (semifinals)
7. (United States) Chanda Rubin / (France) Sandrine Testud (third round)
8. (Spain) Conchita Martínez / (Argentina) Patricia Tarabini (quarterfinals, retired)
9. (Belgium) Laurence Courtois / (Spain) Arantxa Sánchez Vicario (first round)
10. (Spain) Virginia Ruano Pascual / (Argentina) Paola Suárez (final)
11. (United States) Nicole Arendt / (Netherlands) Manon Bollegraf (third round)
12. (Slovenia) Tina Križan / (Slovenia) Katarina Srebotnik (second round)
13. (United States) Kimberly Po / (France) Anne-Gaëlle Sidot (third round)
14. (Sweden) Åsa Carlsson / (France) Émilie Loit (first round)
15. (Germany) Anke Huber / (Austria) Barbara Schett (quarterfinals)
16. (South Africa) Liezel Horn / (Argentina) Laura Montalvo (quarterfinals)

== Draw ==
=== Key ===
- Q = Qualifier
- WC = Wild card
- LL = Lucky loser
- Alt = Alternate
- SE = Special exempt
- PR = Protected ranking
- ITF = ITF entry
- JE = Junior exempt
- w/o = Walkover
- r = Retired
- d = Defaulted
- SR = Special ranking

=== Finals ===
Quarterfinals
WC	(France) Amélie Cocheteux (France) Nathalie Dechy	2	4
5	(France) Julie Halard-Decugis (Japan) Ai Sugiyama	6	6
10	(Spain) Virginia Ruano Pascual (Argentina) Paola Suárez	7^{9}	6
16	(South Africa) Liezel Horn (Argentina) Laura Montalvo	6^{7}	2
8	(Spain) Conchita Martínez (Argentina) Patricia Tarabini	1	0 ^{r}
3	(Switzerland) Martina Hingis (France) Mary Pierce	6	1
6	(France) Alexandra Fusai (France) Nathalie Tauziat	6	6
15	(Germany) Anke Huber (Austria) Barbara Schett	4	3

Semifinals
5	(France) Julie Halard-Decugis (Japan) Ai Sugiyama	4	2
10	(Spain) Virginia Ruano Pascual (Argentina) Paola Suárez	6	6
3	(Switzerland) Martina Hingis (France) Mary Pierce	2	6	6
6	(France) Alexandra Fusai (France) Nathalie Tauziat	6	2	1

Final
10	(Spain) Virginia Ruano Pascual (Argentina) Paola Suárez	2	4
3	(Switzerland) Martina Hingis (France) Mary Pierce	6	6

=== Top half ===
==== Section 1 ====
First round
Alt	(Russia) A Jidkova (Russia) N Petrova	5	6	7
Alt	(Russia) A Myskina (Slovakia) H Nagyová	7	4	5
(Netherlands) A Hopmans (Spain) C Torrens Valero	3	5
WC	(France) A Cocheteux (France) N Dechy	6	7
(South Africa) A Coetzer (United States) L McNeil	4	4
(Zimbabwe) C Black (Kazakhstan) I Selyutina	6	6
(France) A Mauresmo (Netherlands) C Vis	2	3
11	(United States) N Arendt (Netherlands) M Bollegraf	6	6
13	(United States) K Po (France) A-G Sidot	6	6
(Spain) RM Andrés (Spain) C Martínez Granados	3	1
(United States) A Frazier (United States) K Schlukebir	3	3
(Poland) M Grzybowska (Ukraine) E Tatarkova	6	6
(Australia) T Musgrave (Australia) B Stewart	2	2
(Romania) C Cristea (Romania) R Dragomir	6	6
(Brazil) V Menga (Germany) E Wagner	2	3
5	(France) J Halard-Decugis (Japan) A Sugiyama	6	6

Second round
Alt	(Russia) A Jidkova (Russia) N Petrova	4	3
WC	(France) A Cocheteux (France) N Dechy	6	6
(Zimbabwe) C Black (Kazakhstan) I Selyutina	3	7^{7}	8
11	(United States) N Arendt (Netherlands) M Bollegraf	6	6^{1}	10
13	(United States) K Po (France) A-G Sidot	6	6
(Poland) M Grzybowska (Ukraine) E Tatarkova	1	2
(Romania) C Cristea (Romania) R Dragomir	1	1
5	(France) J Halard-Decugis (Japan) A Sugiyama	6	6

Third round
WC	(France) A Cocheteux (France) N Dechy	6	6
11	(United States) N Arendt (Netherlands) M Bollegraf	1	4
13	(United States) K Po (France) A-G Sidot	4	6	2
5	(France) J Halard-Decugis (Japan) A Sugiyama	6	4	6

Quarterfinals
WC	(France) A Cocheteux (France) N Dechy	2	4
5	(France) J Halard-Decugis (Japan) A Sugiyama	6	6

==== Section 2 ====
First round
4	(Russia) A Kournikova (Belarus) N Zvereva	6	6
(Germany) M Babel (Germany) J Kandarr	1	2
(Japan) R Hiraki (Japan) Y Yoshida	3	3
(Australia) B Barclay (Canada) V Webb	6	6
(Italy) T Garbin (Hungary) K Marosi	5	7	5
(South Africa) S De Beer (Japan) N Miyagi	7	5	7
(Czech Republic) R Bobková (Bulgaria) S Krivencheva	1	4
10	(Spain) V Ruano Pascual (Argentina) P Suárez	6	6
16	(South Africa) L Horn (Argentina) L Montalvo	6	6
(Thailand) T Tanasugarn (Germany) J Wöhr	4	4
(Australia) R McQuillan (Australia) L McShea	6	6
(South Africa) N de Villiers (South Africa) J Steck	4	2
(Netherlands) S Noorlander (Spain) Alicia Ortuño	1	6	5
(Italy) A Canepa (Italy) G Casoni	6	4	7
(Croatia) J Kostanić (Slovenia) T Pisnik	4	2
7	(United States) C Rubin (France) S Testud	6	6

Second round
4	(Russia) A Kournikova (Belarus) N Zvereva	6	7^{7}
(Australia) B Barclay (Canada) V Webb	2	6^{3}
(South Africa) S De Beer (Japan) N Miyagi	6	2	2
10	(Spain) V Ruano Pascual (Argentina) P Suárez	4	6	6
16	(South Africa) L Horn (Argentina) L Montalvo	6	6
(Australia) R McQuillan (Australia) L McShea	3	2
(Italy) A Canepa (Italy) G Casoni	6^{5}	1
7	(United States) C Rubin (France) S Testud	7^{7}	6

Third round
4	(Russia) A Kournikova (Belarus) N Zvereva	3	4
10	(Spain) V Ruano Pascual (Argentina) P Suárez	6	6
16	(South Africa) L Horn (Argentina) L Montalvo	6	6^{5}	6
7	(United States) C Rubin (France) S Testud	0	7^{7}	4

Quarterfinals
10	(Spain) V Ruano Pascual (Argentina) P Suárez	7^{9}	6
16	(South Africa) L Horn (Argentina) L Montalvo	6^{7}	2

=== Bottom half ===
==== Section 3 ====
First round
8	(Spain) C Martínez (Argentina) P Tarabini	6	4	6
(Netherlands) K Boogert (Netherlands) M Oremans	4	6	4
(Bulgaria) L Bacheva (Belgium) K Clijsters	2	1
(Czech Republic) K Hrdličková (Germany) B Rittner	6	6
(Belarus) T Poutchek (Slovenia) P Rampre	5	6	6
(Australia) A Molik (United States) L Wild	7	4	1
(Spain) M Serna (United States) M Shaughnessy	6	7
9	(Belgium) L Courtois (Spain) A Sánchez Vicario	3	5
14	(Sweden) Å Carlsson (France) É Loit	2	3
(Italy) S Farina Elia (Slovakia) K Habšudová	6	6
(Russia) L Krasnoroutskaya (Latvia) L Neiland	2	7^{7}	4
(United States) J Capriati (Australia) J Dokic	6	6^{2}	6
WC	(France) S Foretz (France) V Razzano	3	6	6
(Russia) E Likhovtseva (Uzbekistan) I Tulyaganova	6	1	3
(Czech Republic) E Martincová (Federal Republic of Yugoslavia) S Načuk	1	3
3	(Switzerland) M Hingis (France) M Pierce	6	6

Second round
8	(Spain) C Martínez (Argentina) P Tarabini	7^{7}	4	6
(Czech Republic) K Hrdličková (Germany) B Rittner	6^{4}	6	3
(Belarus) T Poutchek (Slovenia) P Rampre	3	2
(Spain) M Serna (United States) M Shaughnessy	6	6
(Italy) S Farina Elia (Slovakia) K Habšudová	3	6	2
(United States) J Capriati (Australia) J Dokic	6	4	6
WC	(France) S Foretz (France) V Razzano	4	0
3	(Switzerland) M Hingis (France) M Pierce	6	6

Third round
8	(Spain) C Martínez (Argentina) P Tarabini	2	6	6
(Spain) M Serna (United States) M Shaughnessy	6	2	4
(United States) J Capriati (Australia) J Dokic	3	2
3	(Switzerland) M Hingis (France) M Pierce	6	6

Quarterfinals
8	(Spain) C Martínez (Argentina) P Tarabini	1	0^{r}
3	(Switzerland) M Hingis (France) M Pierce	6	1

==== Section 4 ====
First round
6	(France) A Fusai (France) N Tauziat	6	6
(Canada) S Jeyaseelan (Argentina) F Labat	1	0
(Spain) E Bes (Spain) G Riera	7	1	6
(Russia) E Kulikovskaya (Austria) P Wartusch	5	6	4
(Belgium) S Appelmans (Italy) R Grande	7	1	3
WC	(South Africa) M de Swardt (United States) M Navratilova	5	6	6
(Australia) A Ellwood (United States) L Osterloh	4	4
12	(Slovenia) T Križan (Slovenia) K Srebotnik	6	6
15	(Germany) A Huber (Austria) B Schett	6	6
(United Kingdom) J Pullin (United Kingdom) L Woodroffe	1	0
(Belgium) E Callens (Belgium) D van Roost	6	6
(Germany) A Bachmann (Austria) K Kschwendt	1	1
(Slovakia) J Husárová (Italy) MP Zavagli	0	6	8
(United States) E deLone (Australia) N Pratt	6	3	6
WC	(France) C Dhenin (France) S Pitkowski	2	1
2	(United States) L Raymond (Australia) R Stubbs	6	6

Second round
6	(France) A Fusai (France) N Tauziat	6	6
(Spain) E Bes (Spain) G Riera	0	3
WC	(South Africa) M de Swardt (United States) M Navratilova	7^{7}	7
12	(Slovenia) T Križan (Slovenia) K Srebotnik	6^{2}	5
15	(Germany) A Huber (Austria) B Schett	7	6
(Belgium) E Callens (Belgium) D van Roost	5	4
(Slovakia) J Husárová (Italy) MP Zavagli	3	0
2	(United States) L Raymond (Australia) R Stubbs	6	6

Third round
6	(France) A Fusai (France) N Tauziat	2	6	7
WC	(South Africa) M de Swardt (United States) M Navratilova	6	2	5
15	(Germany) A Huber (Austria) B Schett	6	6
2	(United States) L Raymond (Australia) R Stubbs	1	4

Quarterfinals
6	(France) A Fusai (France) N Tauziat	6	6
15	(Germany) A Huber (Austria) B Schett	4	3
