= 2000 French Open – Mixed doubles =

Mixed doubles
- 2000 French Open

Final
- Champions: (South Africa) Mariaan de Swardt (South Africa) David Adams
- Runners-up: (Australia) Rennae Stubbs (Australia) Todd Woodbridge
- Score: 6–3, 3–6, 6–3

Details
- Draw: 48
- Seeds: 16

Events
Singles	men	women		boys	girls
Doubles	men	women	mixed	boys	girls
WC Singles	men	women	quad
WC Doubles	men	women	quad
Legends	−45	45+	women
- French Open

Katarina Srebotnik and Piet Norval were the defending champions, but lost in second round to Kim Clijsters and Lleyton Hewitt.

Mariaan de Swardt and David Adams won the title, defeating Rennae Stubbs and Todd Woodbridge 6–3, 3–6, 6–3 in the final. It was the 2nd and final mixed doubles Grand Slam title for both players in their careers.

== Seeds ==
All seeds received a bye into the second round.

1. (Australia) Rennae Stubbs / (Australia) Todd Woodbridge (final)
2. (United States) Lisa Raymond / (India) Leander Paes (third round, withdrew)
3. (Belarus) Natasha Zvereva / (Australia) Sandon Stolle (second round)
4. (Japan) Ai Sugiyama / (South Africa) John-Laffnie de Jager (semifinals)
5. (Russia) Elena Likhovtseva / (United States) Jeff Tarango (quarterfinals)
6. (Netherlands) Manon Bollegraf / (United States) Rick Leach (second round)
7. (Slovenia) Tina Križan / (South Africa) Ellis Ferreira (second round)
8. (France) Nathalie Tauziat / (France) Olivier Delaître (second round)
9. (Slovenia) Katarina Srebotnik / (South Africa) Piet Norval (second round)
10. (Netherlands) Kristie Boogert / (Australia) Mark Woodforde (semifinals)
11. (United States) Kimberly Po / (United States) Donald Johnson (quarterfinals)
12. (South Africa) Mariaan de Swardt / (South Africa) David Adams (champions)
13. (Sweden) Åsa Carlsson / (Sweden) Nicklas Kulti (third round)
14. (withdrew)
15. (Netherlands) Miriam Oremans / (Australia) Andrew Kratzmann (second round)
16. (Spain) Virginia Ruano Pascual / (Spain) Tomás Carbonell (second round)

== Draw ==
Key

- Q = Qualifier
- WC = Wild card
- LL = Lucky loser
- Alt = Alternate
- ITF = ITF entry
- PR = Protected ranking
- SR = Special ranking
- SE = Special exempt
- JE = Junior exempt
- JR = Junior Accelerator Programme entrant
- CO = College Accelerator Programme entrant
- NG = Next Gen Accelerator Program entrant
- w/o = Walkover
- r = Retired
- d = Defaulted

=== Finals ===
Quarterfinals
1	(Australia) Rennae Stubbs (Australia) Todd Woodbridge	6	3	11
5	(Russia) Elena Likhovtseva (United States) Jeff Tarango	3	6	9
4	(Japan) Ai Sugiyama (South Africa) John-Laffnie de Jager	7	4	7
11	(United States) Kimberly Po (United States) Donald Johnson	5	6	5
10	(Netherlands) Kristie Boogert (Australia) Mark Woodforde	6	6
(Romania) Cătălina Cristea (United States) Bob Bryan	2	4
(South Africa) Nannie de Villiers (Sweden) Simon Aspelin	6^{4}	6	2
12	(South Africa) Mariaan de Swardt (South Africa) David Adams	7^{7}	3	6

Semifinals
1	(Australia) Rennae Stubbs (Australia) Todd Woodbridge	6	6
4	(Japan) Ai Sugiyama (South Africa) John-Laffnie de Jager	2	4
10	(Netherlands) Kristie Boogert (Australia) Mark Woodforde	3	6	2
12	(South Africa) Mariaan de Swardt (South Africa) David Adams	6	4	6

Final
1	(Australia) Rennae Stubbs (Australia) Todd Woodbridge	3	6	3
12	(South Africa) Mariaan de Swardt (South Africa) David Adams	6	3	6

=== Top half ===
==== Section 1 ====
First round
(Slovakia) K Habšudová (Australia) M Macpherson	6	6
Alt	(South Africa) De Beer (South Africa) L Bale	3	1
(Croatia) J Kostanić (Sweden) J Landsberg	6	4	4
WC	(Belgium) K Clijsters (Australia) L Hewitt	1	6	6
(Australia) C Barclay (Netherlands) P Haarhuis	7^{7}	6
(Belgium) D van Roost (Belgium) T Vanhoudt	6^{5}	3
(Slovakia) J Husárová (Czech Republic) D Rikl	7	7
(Kazakhstan) I Selyutina (Australia) P Tramacchi	5	5

Second round
1	(Australia) R Stubbs (Australia) T Woodbridge	6	2	6
(Slovakia) K Habšudová (Australia) M Macpherson	1	6	4
WC	(Belgium) K Clijsters (Australia) L Hewitt	3	6	6
9	(Slovenia) K Srebotnik (South Africa) P Norval	6	2	4
15	(Netherlands) M Oremans (Australia) A Kratzmann	1	1
(Australia) C Barclay (Netherlands) P Haarhuis	6	6
(Slovakia) J Husárová (Czech Republic) D Rikl	1	5
5	(Russia) L Likhovtseva (United States) J Tarango	6	7

Third round
1	(Australia) R Stubbs (Australia) T Woodbridge	6	6
WC	(Belgium) K Clijsters (Australia) L Hewitt	3	2
(Australia) C Barclay (Netherlands) P Haarhuis	4	2
5	(Russia) L Likhovtseva (United States) J Tarango	6	6

Quarterfinals
1	(Australia) R Stubbs (Australia) T Woodbridge	6	3	11
5	(Russia) L Likhovtseva (United States) J Tarango	3	6	9

==== Section 2 ====
First round
(Netherlands) C Vis (Argentina) D Orsanic	6	6^{5}	3
(United States) K Schlukebir (South Africa) B Haygarth	4	7^{7}	6
(Argentina) L Montalvo (Argentina) L Arnold Ker	4	2
(Belgium) E Callens (South Africa) C Haggard	6	6
(Australia) R McQuillan (Australia) A Florent	6	3	6
WC	(France) N Dechy (France) S Huet	3	6	2
(United States) N Arendt (Sweden) P Nyborg	6	1	3
(Ukraine) E Tatarkova (United States) J Waite	3	6	6

Second round
4	(Japan) A Sugiyama (South Africa) J-L de Jager	6	6
(United States) K Schlukebir (South Africa) B Haygarth	4	2
(Belgium) E Callens (South Africa) C Haggard	4	6	6
Alt	(South Africa) J Steck (South Africa) M Barnard	6	3	4
11	(United States) K Po (United States) D Johnson	6	2	6
(Australia) R McQuillan (Australia) A Florent	3	6	4
(Ukraine) E Tatarkova (United States) J Waite	6	6
8	(France) N Tauziat (France) O Delaître	4	4

Third round
4	(Japan) A Sugiyama (South Africa) J-L de Jager	7^{7}	6
(Belgium) E Callens (South Africa) C Haggard	6^{2}	4
11	(United States) K Po (United States) D Johnson	6	6
(Ukraine) E Tatarkova (United States) J Waite	2	3

Quarterfinals
4	(Japan) A Sugiyama (South Africa) J-L de Jager	7	4	7
11	(United States) K Po (United States) D Johnson	5	6	5

=== Bottom half ===
==== Section 3 ====
First round
(United States) M Shaughnessy (Sweden) F Bergh	0
(Japan) R Hiraki (United States) D Bowen	0^{r}
(Australia) A Molik (Australia) J Eagle	3	6	6
WC	(France) A-G Sidot (France) A Clément	6	3	8
WC	(France) É Loit (France) J Boutter	3	4
(Zimbabwe) C Black (United States) P Galbraith	6	6
(Romania) C Cristea (United States) B Bryan	6	6
(Canada) S Jeyaseelan (Argentina) M García	3	1

Second round
7	(Slovenia) T Križan (South Africa) E Ferreira	3	4
(United States) M Shaughnessy (Sweden) F Bergh	6	6
WC	(France) A-G Sidot (France) A Clément	4	5
10	(Netherlands) K Boogert (Australia) M Woodforde	6	7
16	(Spain) V Ruano Pascual (Spain) T Carbonell	3	6	6
(Zimbabwe) C Black (United States) P Galbraith	6	4	8
(Romania) C Cristea (United States) B Bryan	7	1	6
3	(Belarus) N Zvereva (Australia) S Stolle	5	6	4

Third round
(United States) M Shaughnessy (Sweden) F Bergh	3	4
10	(Netherlands) K Boogert (Australia) M Woodforde	6	6
(Zimbabwe) C Black (United States) P Galbraith	4	3
(Romania) C Cristea (United States) B Bryan	6	6

Quarterfinals
10	(Netherlands) K Boogert (Australia) M Woodforde	6	6
(Romania) C Cristea (United States) B Bryan	2	4

==== Section 4 ====
First round
(South Africa) N de Villiers (Sweden) S Aspelin	6	7
(France) J Halard-Decugis (France) M Llodra	2	5
(Australia) J Dokic (United States) S Humphries	6	6
(Austria) K Kscwhendt (North Macedonia) A Kitinov	4	4
WC	(United States) M Navratilova (Netherlands) J Siemerink	7^{7}	6
(Latvia) L Neiland (Czech Republic) C Suk	6^{3}	3
(South Africa) L Horn (Russia) A Olhovskiy	3	6	1
(Japan) N Miyagi (Australia) M Hill	6	1	6

Second round
6	(Netherlands) M Bollegraf (United States) R Leach	4	4
(South Africa) N de Villiers (Sweden) S Aspelin	6	6
(Australia) J Dokic (United States) S Humphries	4	3
13	(Sweden) Å Carlsson (Sweden) N Kulti	6	6
12	(South Africa) M de Swardt (South Africa) D Adams	6	6
WC	(United States) M Navratilova (Netherlands) J Siemerink	3	3
(Japan) N Miyagi (Australia) M Hill	2	3
2	(United States) L Raymond (India) L Paes	6	6

Third round
(South Africa) N de Villiers (Sweden) S Aspelin	7^{7}	7^{7}
13	(Sweden) Å Carlsson (Sweden) N Kulti	6^{1}	6^{4}
12	(South Africa) M de Swardt (South Africa) D Adams	w/o
2	(United States) L Raymond (India) L Paes

Quarterfinals
(South Africa) N de Villiers (Sweden) S Aspelin	6^{4}	6	2
12	(South Africa) M de Swardt (South Africa) D Adams	7^{7}	3	6
