= 2000 French Open – Men's singles =

Men's singles
- 2000 French Open

Final
- Champion: (Brazil) Gustavo Kuerten
- Runner-up: (Sweden) Magnus Norman
- Score: 6–2, 6–3, 2–6, 7–6^{(8–6)}

Details
- Draw: 128
- Seeds: 16

Events
Singles	men	women		boys	girls
Doubles	men	women	mixed	boys	girls
WC Singles	men	women	quad
WC Doubles	men	women	quad
Legends	−45	45+	women
- French Open

Gustavo Kuerten defeated Magnus Norman in the final, 6–2, 6–3, 2–6, 7–6^{(8–6)} to win the men's singles tennis title at the 2000 French Open. It was his second French Open title and second major title overall. The final was a rematch of the Rome final four weeks earlier, won by Norman. The final took a dramatic turn in the fourth set, when on match point down, Norman challenged a call that was ruled out, initially ending the match. The umpire overruled in favor of Norman, extending the match, whence Norman would go on to save another nine match points, until 52 points later, Kuerten finally prevailed on the eleventh match point in the fourth-set tiebreak.

Andre Agassi was the defending champion, but lost in the second round to Karol Kučera.

== Seeds ==
1. (United States) Andre Agassi (second round)
2. (United States) Pete Sampras (first round)
3. (Sweden) Magnus Norman (final)
4. (Russia) Yevgeny Kafelnikov (quarterfinals)
5. (Brazil) Gustavo Kuerten (champion)
6. (France) Cédric Pioline (fourth round)
7. (Sweden) Thomas Enqvist (third round)
8. (Germany) Nicolas Kiefer (first round)

9. (Australia) Lleyton Hewitt (fourth round)
10. (Spain) Àlex Corretja (quarterfinals)
11. (Ecuador) Nicolás Lapentti (fourth round)
12. (Russia) Marat Safin (quarterfinals)
13. (United Kingdom) Tim Henman (third round)
14. (Slovakia) Dominik Hrbatý (second round)
15. (Morocco) Younes El Aynaoui (fourth round)
16. (Spain) Juan Carlos Ferrero (semifinals)

Click on the seed number of a player to go to their draw section.

== Draw ==
Key

- Q = Qualifier
- WC = Wild card
- LL = Lucky loser
- Alt = Alternate
- ITF = ITF entry
- PR = Protected ranking
- SR = Special ranking
- SE = Special exempt
- JE = Junior exempt
- JR = Junior Accelerator Programme entrant
- CO = College Accelerator Programme entrant
- NG = Next Gen Accelerator Program entrant
- w/o = Walkover
- r = Retired
- d = Defaulted

=== Finals ===
Quarterfinals
(Argentina) Franco Squillari	6	6	2	6
(Spain) Albert Costa	4	4	6	4
3	(Sweden) Magnus Norman	6	6	4	7
12	(Russia) Marat Safin	4	3	6	5
5	(Brazil) Gustavo Kuerten	6	3	4	6	6
4	(Russia) Yevgeny Kafelnikov	3	6	6	4	2
10	(Spain) Àlex Corretja	4	4	2
16	(Spain) Juan Carlos Ferrero	6	6	6

Semifinals
(Argentina) Franco Squillari	1	4	3
3	(Sweden) Magnus Norman	6	6	6
5	(Brazil) Gustavo Kuerten	7	4	2	6	6
16	(Spain) Juan Carlos Ferrero	5	6	6	4	3

Final
3	(Sweden) Magnus Norman	2	3	6	6^{6}
5	(Brazil) Gustavo Kuerten	6	6	2	7^{8}

=== Top half ===
==== Section 1 ====
First round
1	(United States) A Agassi	7^{9}	6	6
WC	(France) A Dupuis	6^{7}	3	4
Q	(Spain) Ó Serrano	1	2	1
(Slovakia) K Kučera	6	6	6
(Czech Republic) J Vaněk	6	6	6^{5}	5	6
(Spain) A Berasategui	1	1	7^{7}	7	1
(Germany) A Popp	6	3	2	0
(Argentina) F Squillari	3	6	6	6
Q	(Spain) J Díaz	4	3	3
(Chile) N Massú	6	6	6
(Australia) J Stoltenberg	6	6	3	6
(Czech Republic) J Novák	4	3	6	1
(United States) T Martin	6	3	4	4
(Argentina) JI Chela	4	6	6	6
WC	(France) J-R Lisnard	6	6	4	3	1
15	(Morocco) Y El Aynaoui	3	2	6	6	6

Second round
1	(United States) A Agassi	6	5	1	0
(Slovakia) K Kučera	2	7	6	6
(Czech Republic) J Vaněk	5	3	7^{7}	4
(Argentina) F Squillari	7	6	6^{5}	6
(Chile) N Massú	3	1	5
(Australia) J Stoltenberg	6	6	7
(Argentina) JI Chela	3	4	0
15	(Morocco) Y El Aynaoui	6	6	6

Third round
(Slovakia) K Kučera	1	4	6	4
(Argentina) F Squillari	6	6	4	6
(Australia) J Stoltenberg	4	5^{r}
15	(Morocco) Y El Aynaoui	6	5

Fourth round
(Argentina) F Squillari	6	6	6
15	(Morocco) Y El Aynaoui	4	1	3

==== Section 2 ====
First round
9	(Australia) L Hewitt	7^{7}	7^{7}	6
(United States) J Tarango	6^{5}	6^{3}	3
(Germany) M Hantschk	6	6^{7}	7^{7}	6
(Germany) D Prinosil	2	7^{9}	6^{5}	4
(Argentina) M Rodríguez	6	6	4	4	2
Q	(Hungary) A Sávolt	3	3	6	6	6
(Austria) S Koubek	6	1	7^{7}	6
(Spain) G Blanco	3	6	6^{5}	2
(Croatia) G Ivanišević	3	3	0
(Spain) A Costa	6	6	6
(Argentina) H Gumy	7^{7}	6	4	3	6
(Spain) C Moyá	6^{4}	2	6	6	3
(Argentina) G Gaudio	6	6	6
(France) A Di Pasquale	2	3	2
(Belgium) C Rochus	2	0	0
7	(Sweden) T Enqvist	6	6	6

Second round
9	(Australia) L Hewitt	2	6	3	6	6
(Germany) M Hantschk	6	3	6	2	3
Q	(Hungary) A Sávolt	3	7	6	5
(Austria) S Koubek	6	5	0	2^{d}
(Spain) A Costa	4	6	7	1
(Argentina) H Gumy	6	3	5	0^{r}
(Argentina) G Gaudio	3	2	0
7	(Sweden) T Enqvist	6	6	6

Third round
9	(Australia) L Hewitt	6	6	6
Q	(Hungary) A Sávolt	1	4	0
(Spain) A Costa	5	7^{7}	6	3	6
7	(Sweden) T Enqvist	7	6^{2}	1	6	4

Fourth round
9	(Australia) L Hewitt	3	6	2	4
(Spain) A Costa	6	4	6	6

==== Section 3 ====
First round
3	(Sweden) M Norman	6	6	6
Q	(France) T Guardiola	4	4	0
(France) F Santoro	6	3	6	6
(Sweden) M Gustafsson	3	6	4	4
(Netherlands) S Schalken	7	6	6^{1}	3	2
(Armenia) S Sargsian	5	3	7^{7}	6	6
(France) A Clément	7^{8}	6	6
(France) N Escudé	6^{6}	4	0
(Sweden) M Tillström	6	6^{7}	6^{5}	2
(Ukraine) A Medvedev	1	7^{9}	7^{7}	6
(Zimbabwe) B Black	5	5	0
(Switzerland) M Rosset	7	7	6
(Spain) F Mantilla	2	3	4
Q	(Argentina) A Calleri	6	6	6
(Sweden) J Björkman	3	2	1
14	(Slovakia) D Hrbatý	6	6	6

Second round
3	(Sweden) M Norman	6	6	6
(France) F Santoro	1	4	2
(Armenia) S Sargsian	6^{5}	6	2	6	6
(France) A Clément	7^{7}	3	6	0	4
(Ukraine) A Medvedev	6	6	6
(Switzerland) M Rosset	1	2	2
Q	(Argentina) A Calleri	6^{2}	6	6	6
14	(Slovakia) D Hrbatý	7^{7}	1	4	4

Third round
3	(Sweden) M Norman	6	6	6
(Armenia) S Sargsian	4	1	2
(Ukraine) A Medvedev	6	3	6	6
Q	(Argentina) A Calleri	3	6	4	3

Fourth round
3	(Sweden) M Norman	6	6	6
(Ukraine) A Medvedev	0	4	2

==== Section 4 ====
First round
12	(Russia) M Safin	6^{4}	6	6	6
(Switzerland) G Bastl	7^{7}	1	3	2
WC	(France) G Raoux	3	6	0	5
(Australia) A Ilie	6	4	6	7
(Netherlands) J van Lottum	3	6	6^{3}	0
(Italy) A Gaudenzi	6	3	7^{7}	6
(Chile) M Ríos	3	2	0^{r}
(Germany) T Haas	6	6	0
WC	(Spain) S Bruguera	3	7	2	6	0
Q	(Spain) J Balcells	6	5	6	1	6
(Romania) A Pavel	2	6^{1}	1
(Spain) A Portas	6	7^{7}	6
(Italy) G Pozzi	3	1	1
(Australia) P Rafter	6	6	6
(Italy) D Sanguinetti	6	0	0^{r}
6	(France) C Pioline	4	6	4

Second round
12	(Russia) M Safin	7	4	5	6	5
(Australia) A Ilie	5	6	7	3	0^{r}
(Italy) A Gaudenzi	6	6	6^{3}	6^{4}	1
(Germany) T Haas	4	3	7^{7}	7^{7}	6
Q	(Spain) J Balcells	6	3	5	3
(Spain) A Portas	4	6	7	6
(Australia) P Rafter	6^{5}	3	4
6	(France) C Pioline	7^{7}	6	6

Third round
12	(Russia) M Safin	7^{7}	6	6
(Germany) T Haas	6^{2}	3	3
(Spain) A Portas	4	3	3
6	(France) C Pioline	6	6	6

Fourth round
12	(Russia) M Safin	6	1	6	7
6	(France) C Pioline	4	6	3	5

=== Bottom half ===
==== Section 5 ====
First round
5	(Brazil) G Kuerten	6	6	6
(Sweden) A Vinciguerra	0	0	3
(Morocco) K Alami	7^{7}	4	3	6	3
Q	(Argentina) M Charpentier	6^{1}	6	6	1	6
(Sweden) T Johansson	7^{7}	6	6
(Norway) C Ruud	6^{4}	3	3
(Romania) A Voinea	1	2	6	3
(United States) M Chang	6	6	2	6
(Germany) R Schüttler	6^{5}	6	3	2
(South Africa) W Ferreira	7^{7}	4	6	6
Q	(Argentina) G Coria	6	6^{6}	6	6
WC	(France) M Llodra	3	7^{8}	4	4
Q	(Czech Republic) B Ulihrach	6	6	5	6
Q	(Germany) B Phau	4	1	7	4
WC	(France) J Boutter	4	2	0
11	(Ecuador) N Lapentti	6	6	6

Second round
5	(Brazil) G Kuerten	7^{7}	6	6
Q	(Argentina) M Charpentier	6^{5}	2	2
(Sweden) T Johansson	6^{2}	6^{5}	6	3
(United States) M Chang	7^{7}	7^{7}	2	6
(South Africa) W Ferreira	6	6	4	7
Q	(Argentina) G Coria	3	1	6	5
Q	(Czech Republic) B Ulihrach	6^{4}	3	7^{7}	3
11	(Ecuador) N Lapentti	7^{7}	6	6^{4}	6

Third round
5	(Brazil) G Kuerten	6	6^{9}	6	6
(United States) M Chang	3	7^{11}	1	4
(South Africa) W Ferreira	7	3	5	3
11	(Ecuador) N Lapentti	5	6	7	6

Fourth round
5	(Brazil) G Kuerten	6	6	7^{7}
11	(Ecuador) N Lapentti	3	4	6^{4}

==== Section 6 ====
First round
13	(United Kingdom) T Henman	7	7	6
(United States) V Spadea	5	5	4
LL	(Germany) T Behrend	1	4	4
Q	(Germany) C Vinck	6	6	6
(Spain) F Vicente	3	5	6	6	6
(Belarus) M Mirnyi	6	7	3	4	4
(Haiti) R Agénor	6	6	3	7^{7}
(Thailand) P Srichaphan	2	4	6	6^{5}
(France) S Grosjean	6	6	1	6
(Australia) R Fromberg	4	2	6	1
(Costa Rica) JA Marín	5	3	7^{12}	1
LL	(Argentina) F Browne	7	6	6^{10}	6
Q	(Israel) H Levy	7	6^{1}	4	4
(Argentina) M Zabaleta	5	7^{7}	6	6
(Croatia) I Ljubičić	4	4	6	6	4
4	(Russia) Y Kafelnikov	6	6	3	3	6

Second round
13	(United Kingdom) T Henman	6	6	7^{7}
Q	(Germany) C Vinck	2	4	6^{3}
(Spain) F Vicente	6	6	6
(Haiti) R Agénor	1	0	3
(France) S Grosjean	6	6	2	6^{6}	6
LL	(Argentina) F Browne	1	3	6	7^{8}	2
(Argentina) M Zabaleta	2	6	7^{8}	4	4
4	(Russia) Y Kafelnikov	6	3	6^{6}	6	6

Third round
13	(United Kingdom) T Henman	5	6	4	6	3
(Spain) F Vicente	7	4	6	4	6
(France) S Grosjean	3	1	7	4
4	(Russia) Y Kafelnikov	6	6	5	6

Fourth round
(Spain) F Vicente	7	3	7	6^{4}	6
4	(Russia) Y Kafelnikov	5	6	5	7^{7}	8

==== Section 7 ====
First round
8	(Germany) N Kiefer	3	5	1
(United States) J-M Gambill	6	7	6
(Australia) W Arthurs	6^{4}	3	6	3
(Switzerland) R Federer	7^{7}	6	1	6
WC	(France) S Huet	6	6	5	4	5
(Bulgaria) O Stanoytchev	4	0	7	6	7
Q	(Switzerland) M Kratochvil	6	6^{3}	6	6
(United States) J Gimelstob	4	7^{7}	3	1
Q	(Austria) W Eschauer	3	6	6	6
WC	(France) C Saulnier	6	2	2	2
(Netherlands) R Krajicek	6	6	6
(Czech Republic) T Zíb	3	1	2
(Brazil) F Meligeni	2	6	6	7
Q	(France) É Prodon	6	4	3	5
(Spain) A Martín	3	4	4
10	(Spain) À Corretja	6	6	6

Second round
(United States) J-M Gambill	6^{5}	3	3
(Switzerland) R Federer	7^{7}	6	6
(Bulgaria) O Stanoytchev	7^{8}	5	2	1
Q	(Switzerland) M Kratochvil	6^{6}	7	6	6
Q	(Austria) W Eschauer	5	3	5
(Netherlands) R Krajicek	7	6	7
(Brazil) F Meligeni	6	3	3	6	3
10	(Spain) À Corretja	4	6	6	4	6

Third round
(Switzerland) R Federer	7^{7}	6	2	6^{4}	8
Q	(Switzerland) M Kratochvil	6^{5}	4	6	7^{7}	6
(Netherlands) R Krajicek	6	2	3	2
10	(Spain) À Corretja	4	6	6	6

Fourth round
(Switzerland) R Federer	5	6^{7}	2
10	(Spain) À Corretja	7	7^{9}	6

==== Section 8 ====
First round
16	(Spain) JC Ferrero	6	6	6
(France) J Golmard	4	3	2
(United Kingdom) G Rusedski	3	6^{10}	6^{4}
(Czech Republic) S Doseděl	6	7^{12}	7^{7}
(Argentina) M Puerta	7^{7}	6	6
(Czech Republic) M Damm	6^{4}	3	2
(Spain) F Clavet	6	6	6
(Argentina) G Cañas	2	0	3
(Morocco) H Arazi	6	6	7^{7}
(United States) C Woodruff	3	4	6^{3}
Q	(France) N Mahut	4	5	4
(Austria) M Hipfl	6	7	6
(Brazil) A Sá	1	1	6^{7}
(United States) P Goldstein	6	6	7^{9}
(Australia) M Philippoussis	4	7	7^{7}	4	8
2	(United States) P Sampras	6	5	6^{4}	6	6

Second round
16	(Spain) JC Ferrero	1	2	6	6	6
(Czech Republic) S Doseděl	6	6	2	4	4
(Argentina) M Puerta	6	6	6
(Spain) F Clavet	2	1	3
(Morocco) H Arazi	6	3	5	6	6
(Austria) M Hipfl	3	6	7	2	1
(United States) P Goldstein	4	7^{7}	0	2
(Australia) M Philippoussis	6	6^{3}	6	6

Third round
16	(Spain) JC Ferrero	6	3
(Argentina) M Puerta	2	2^{r}
(Morocco) H Arazi	2	1	6	3
(Australia) M Philippoussis	6	6	3	6

Fourth round
16	(Spain) JC Ferrero	6	6	3	6
(Australia) M Philippoussis	2	2	6	3

== Men's singles overview ==
Champion		Runner-up	
(Brazil) Gustavo Kuerten (5)		(Sweden) Magnus Norman (3)	
Semifinals out
(Argentina) Franco Squillari		(Spain) Juan Carlos Ferrero (16)	
Quarterfinals out
(Spain) A Costa	(Russia) M Safin (12)	(Russia) Y Kafelnikov (4)	(Spain) À Corretja (10)
4th round out
(Morocco) Y El Aynaoui (15)	(Australia) L Hewitt (9)	(Ukraine) A Medvedev	(France) C Pioline (6)
(Ecuador) N Lapentti (11)	(Spain) F Vicente	(Switzerland) R Federer	(Australia) M Philippoussis
3rd round out
(Slovakia) K Kučera	(Australia) J Stoltenberg	(Hungary) A Sávolt	(Sweden) T Enqvist (7)
(Armenia) S Sargsian	(Argentina) A Calleri	(Germany) T Haas	(Spain) A Portas
(United States) M Chang	(South Africa) W Ferreira	(United Kingdom) T Henman (13)	(France) S Grosjean
(Switzerland) M Kratochvil	(Netherlands) R Krajicek	(Argentina) M Puerta	(Morocco) H Arazi
2nd round out
(United States) A Agassi (1)	(Czech Republic) J Vaněk	(Chile) N Massú	(Argentina) J I Chela
(Germany) M Hantschk	(Austria) S Koubek	(Argentina) H Gumy	(Argentina) G Gaudio
(France) F Santoro	(France) A Clément	(Switzerland) M Rosset	(Slovakia) D Hrbatý (14)
(Australia) A Ilie	(Italy) A Gaudenzi	(Spain) J Balcells	(Australia) P Rafter
(Argentina) M Charpentier	(Sweden) T Johansson	(Argentina) G Coria	(Czech Republic) B Ulihrach
(Germany) C Vinck	(Haiti) R Agénor	(Argentina) F Browne	(Argentina) M Zabaleta
(United States) J-M Gambill	(Bulgaria) O Stanoytchev	(Austria) W Eschauer	(Brazil) F Meligeni
(Czech Republic) S Doseděl	(Spain) F Clavet	(Austria) M Hipfl	(United States) P Goldstein
1st round out
(France) A Dupuis	(Spain) O Serrano	(Spain) A Berasategui	(Germany) A Popp
(Spain) J Díaz	(Czech Republic) J Novák	(United States) T Martin	(France) J-R Lisnard
(United States) J Tarango	(Germany) D Prinosil	(Argentina) M Rodríguez	(Spain) G Blanco
(Croatia) G Ivanišević	(Spain) C Moyá	(France) A Di Pasquale	(Belgium) C Rochus
(France) T Guardiola	(Sweden) M Gustafsson	(Netherlands) S Schalken	(France) N Escudé
(Sweden) M Tillström	(Zimbabwe) B Black	(Spain) F Mantilla	(Sweden) J Björkman
(Switzerland) G Bastl	(France) G Raoux	(Netherlands) J van Lottum	(Chile) M Ríos
(Spain) S Bruguera	(Romania) A Pavel	(Italy) G Pozzi	(Italy) D Sanguinetti
(Sweden) A Vinciguerra	(Morocco) K Alami	(Norway) C Ruud	(Romania) A Voinea
(Germany) R Schüttler	(France) M Llodra	(Germany) B Phau	(France) J Boutter
(United States) V Spadea	(Germany) T Behrend	(Belarus) M Mirnyi	(Thailand) P Srichaphan
(Australia) R Fromberg	(Costa Rica) J A Marín	(Israel) H Levy	(Croatia) I Ljubičić
(Germany) N Kiefer (8)	(Australia) W Arthurs	(France) S Huet	(United States) J Gimelstob
(France) C Saulnier	(Czech Republic) T Zíb	(France) É Prodon	(Spain) A Martín
(France) J Golmard	(United Kingdom) G Rusedski	(Czech Republic) M Damm	(Argentina) G Cañas
(United States) C Woodruff	(France) N Mahut	(Brazil) A Sá	(United States) P Sampras (2)

Preceded by 2000 Australian Open – Men's singles	Grand Slam men's singles	Succeeded by 2000 Wimbledon Championships – Men's singles
