= 2000 French Open – Women's singles =

Women's singles
- 2000 French Open

Final
- Champion: (France) Mary Pierce
- Runner-up: (Spain) Conchita Martínez
- Score: 6–2, 7–5

Details
- Seeds: 16

Events
| Singles | men | women | | boys | girls |
| Doubles | men | women | mixed | boys | girls |
| WC Singles | men | women | quad |
| WC Doubles | men | women | quad |
| Legends | −45 | 45+ | women |
| ← 1999 · | French Open | · 2001 → |

Mary Pierce defeated Conchita Martínez in the final, 6–2, 7–5 to win the women's singles tennis title at the 2000 French Open. It was her second and last major singles title. Pierce was the first Frenchwoman to win the title since Françoise Dürr in 1967, and remains the most recent Frenchwoman to win the tournament.

Steffi Graf was the reigning champion, but she retired from professional tennis in August 1999.

This marked the French Open main-draw debut of future champion Anastasia Myskina; she lost to Cara Black in the first round.

== Seeds ==
1. (Switzerland) Martina Hingis (semifinals)
2. (United States) Lindsay Davenport (first round)
3. (United States) Monica Seles (quarterfinals)
4. (United States) Venus Williams (quarterfinals)
5. (Spain) Conchita Martínez (final)
6. (France) Mary Pierce (champion)
7. (France) Nathalie Tauziat (third round)
8. (Spain) Arantxa Sánchez Vicario (semifinals)
9. (South Africa) Amanda Coetzer (third round)
10. (France) Sandrine Testud (third round)
11. (Germany) Anke Huber (fourth round)
12. (France) Julie Halard-Decugis (first round)
13. (France) Amélie Mauresmo (fourth round)
14. (Russia) Anna Kournikova (second round)
15. (United States) Jennifer Capriati (first round)
16. (Austria) Barbara Schett (fourth round)

== Draw ==
=== Key ===
- Q = Qualifier
- WC = Wild card
- LL = Lucky loser
- r = Retired

=== Finals ===
Quarterfinals
1 | (Switzerland) Martina Hingis | 6 | 6
(United States) Chanda Rubin | 1 | 3
3 | (United States) Monica Seles | 6 | 3 | 4
6 | (France) Mary Pierce | 4 | 6 | 6
8 | (Spain) Arantxa Sánchez Vicario | 6 | 1 | 6
4 | (United States) Venus Williams | 0 | 6 | 2
5 | (Spain) Conchita Martínez | 7^{7} | 6
Q | (Spain) Marta Marrero | 6^{5} | 1

Semifinals
1 | (Switzerland) Martina Hingis | 4 | 7 | 2
6 | (France) Mary Pierce | 6 | 5 | 6
8 | (Spain) Arantxa Sánchez Vicario | 1 | 2
5 | (Spain) Conchita Martínez | 6 | 6

Final
6 | (France) Mary Pierce | 6 | 7
5 | (Spain) Conchita Martínez | 2 | 5

=== Earlier rounds ===
==== Section 1 ====
First round
1 | (Switzerland) M Hingis | 6 | 6
(Belgium) S Appelmans | 0 | 4
Q | (Germany) J Abe | 1 | 6 | 6
Q | (Austria) M Maruska | 6 | 3 | 4
Q | (Russia) E Bovina | 4 | 2
(United States) L Raymond | 6 | 6
(Czech Republic) R Bobková | 1 | 2
(Italy) T Garbin | 6 | 6
(Czech Republic) D Chládková | 6 | 6
(Canada) J Nejedly | 3 | 4
(Israel) A Smashnova | 3 | 4
(Bulgaria) M Maleeva | 6 | 6
(Romania) R Dragomir | 6 | 6
(Slovakia) K Habšudová | 1 | 4
(United States) M Shaughnessy | 7 | 6
12 | (France) J Halard-Decugis | 5 | 4

Second round
1 | (Switzerland) M Hingis | 6 | 7
Q | (Germany) J Abe | 4 | 5
(United States) L Raymond | 1 | 6 | 4
(Italy) T Garbin | 6 | 3 | 6
(Czech Republic) D Chládková | 6^{5} | 6 | 2
(Bulgaria) M Maleeva | 7^{7} | 2 | 6
(Romania) R Dragomir | 6 | 7
(United States) M Shaughnessy | 1 | 5

Third round
1 | (Switzerland) M Hingis | 6 | 6
(Italy) T Garbin | 1 | 0
(Bulgaria) M Maleeva | 6^{5} | 1
(Romania) R Dragomir | 7^{7} | 6

Fourth round
1 | (Switzerland) M Hingis | 6 | 0 | 6
(Romania) R Dragomir | 3 | 6 | 1

==== Section 2 ====
First round
15 | (United States) J Capriati | 3 | 5
(Colombia) F Zuluaga | 6 | 7
(Hungary) P Mandula | 6 | 6
(Russia) T Panova | 2 | 4
(Belarus) N Zvereva | 1 | 6 | 6
(Argentina) P Suárez | 6 | 1 | 4
(Hungary) K Marosi | 3 | 1
(Belgium) E Callens | 6 | 6
(Netherlands) M Oremans | 5 | 6 | 6
(South Africa) J Kruger | 7 | 4 | 1
(United States) C Rubin | 6 | 7
(Federal Republic of Yugoslavia) S Načuk | 1 | 5
(United States) A Stevenson | 6^{5} | 2
(Argentina) F Labat | 7^{7} | 6
(Netherlands) K Boogert | 3 | 3
7 | (France) N Tauziat | 6 | 6

Second round
(Colombia) F Zuluaga | 6 | 6
(Hungary) P Mandula | 1 | 0
(Belarus) N Zvereva | 6 | 4 | 6
(Belgium) E Callens | 4 | 6 | 2
(Netherlands) M Oremans | 6 | 6^{2} | 3
(United States) C Rubin | 1 | 7^{7} | 6
(Argentina) F Labat | 1 | 3
7 | (France) N Tauziat | 6 | 6

Third round
(Colombia) F Zuluaga | 6 | 2 | 0^{r}
(Belarus) N Zvereva | 4 | 6 | 1
(United States) C Rubin | 6 | 7^{7}
7 | (France) N Tauziat | 4 | 6^{3}

Fourth round
(Belarus) N Zvereva | 4 | 5
(United States) C Rubin | 6 | 7

==== Section 3 ====
First round
3 | (United States) M Seles | 6 | 6
(Croatia) S Talaja | 2 | 2
(Switzerland) E Gagliardi | 6 | 6
(Switzerland) P Schnyder | 3 | 4
(Hungary) R Kuti-Kis | 6 | 7^{8}
Q | (United States) J Hopkins | 2 | 6^{6}
Q | (Hungary) A Földényi | 4 | 6 | 6
(United States) H Parkinson | 6 | 4 | 4
(Slovenia) T Pisnik | 6 | 6^{3} | 4
(Australia) J Dokić | 3 | 7^{7} | 6
(China) Y-Q Yi | 3 | 6 | 6
(Czech Republic) K Hrdličková | 6 | 1 | 8
(Austria) P Wartusch | 0 | 0
(Spain) Á Montolio | 6 | 6
(United States) L Osterloh | 2 | 3
13 | (France) A Mauresmo | 6 | 6

Second round
3 | (United States) M Seles | 6 | 6
(Switzerland) E Gagliardi | 0 | 1
(Hungary) R Kuti-Kis | 6 | 7
Q | (Hungary) A Földényi | 2 | 5
(Australia) J Dokić | 3 | 1
(Czech Republic) K Hrdličková | 6 | 6
(Spain) Á Montolio | 3 | 4
13 | (France) A Mauresmo | 6 | 6

Third round
3 | (United States) M Seles | 6 | 6
(Hungary) R Kuti-Kis | 1 | 2
(Czech Republic) K Hrdličková | 1 | 0
13 | (France) A Mauresmo | 6 | 6

Fourth round
3 | (United States) M Seles | 7 | 6
13 | (France) A Mauresmo | 5 | 3

==== Section 4 ====
First round
10 | (France) S Testud | 7^{8} | 6
(Netherlands) S Noorlander | 6^{6} | 1
(France) S Pitkowski | 5 | 3
(Italy) R Grande | 7 | 6
(Spain) C Torrens Valero | 7^{7} | 5 | 4
WC | (Croatia) I Majoli | 6^{4} | 7 | 6
(United States) A Frazier | 3 | 6 | 5
(Sweden) Å Carlsson | 6 | 4 | 7
WC | (France) V Razzano | 5 | 7^{7} | 6
(Bulgaria) L Bacheva | 7 | 6^{4} | 0
(Russia) E Dementieva | 7 | 6
(France) N Dechy | 5 | 1
(Belarus) O Barabanschikova | 6 | 3 | 3
(Germany) B Rittner | 2 | 6 | 6
(United States) T Snyder | 3 | 1
6 | (France) M Pierce | 6 | 6

Second round
10 | (France) S Testud | 6 | 6
(Italy) R Grande | 1 | 1
WC | (Croatia) I Majoli | 6^{6} | 6 | 1
(Sweden) Å Carlsson | 7^{8} | 1 | 6
WC | (France) V Razzano | w/o
(Russia) E Dementieva
(Germany) B Rittner | 1 | 1
6 | (France) M Pierce | 6 | 6

Third round
10 | (France) S Testud | 6 | 3 | 5
(Sweden) Å Carlsson | 4 | 6 | 7
WC | (France) V Razzano | 4 | 0
6 | (France) M Pierce | 6 | 6

Fourth round
(Sweden) Å Carlsson | 2 | 1
6 | (France) M Pierce | 6 | 6

==== Section 5 ====
First round
8 | (Spain) A Sánchez Vicario | 6 | 6
(Bulgaria) P Nola | 1 | 1
(Canada) S Jeyaseelan | 6^{3} | 6 | 6
(France) A Cocheteux | 7^{7} | 2 | 4
(Slovakia) H Nagyová | 2 | 4
(Spain) M Serna | 6 | 6
WC | (France) L Andretto | 2 | 1
(United States) K Brandi | 6 | 6
Q | (Italy) G Casoni | 1 | 7^{7} | 6
(Belgium) L Courtois | 6 | 6^{3} | 4
(Netherlands) A Hopmans | 6 | 5 | 3
(Slovenia) K Srebotnik | 4 | 7 | 6
(Croatia) J Kostanić | 5 | 1
WC | (France) A Fusai | 7 | 6
(Czech Republic) S Kleinová | 3 | 4
16 | (Austria) B Schett | 6 | 6

Second round
8 | (Spain) A Sánchez Vicario | 3 | 6 | 6
(Canada) S Jeyaseelan | 6 | 2 | 2
(Spain) M Serna | 5 | 6 | 6
(United States) K Brandi | 7 | 2 | 2
Q | (Italy) G Casoni | 6 | 7^{7}
(Slovenia) K Srebotnik | 3 | 6^{5}
WC | (France) A Fusai | 1 | 2
16 | (Austria) B Schett | 6 | 6

Third round
8 | (Spain) A Sánchez Vicario | 7 | 6
(Spain) M Serna | 5 | 4
Q | (Italy) G Casoni | 2 | 1
16 | (Austria) B Schett | 6 | 6

Fourth round
8 | (Spain) A Sánchez Vicario | 0 | 6 | 6
16 | (Austria) B Schett | 6 | 4 | 2

==== Section 6 ====
First round
11 | (Germany) A Huber | 3 | 6 | 7
(Russia) N Petrova | 6 | 4 | 5
(Venezuela) M-A Vento | 1 | 2
(United States) C Morariu | 6 | 6
Q | (Poland) M Grzybowska | 6 | 2 | 7
(Russia) E Likhovtseva | 0 | 6 | 5
(Austria) B Schwartz | 3 | 2
(United States) E deLone | 6 | 6
(Germany) M Babel | 6 | 6^{4} | 6
WC | (France) S Cohen-Aloro | 4 | 7^{7} | 1
WC | (France) É Loit | 6 | 6
(Australia) N Pratt | 3 | 2
WC | (France) S Erre | 6^{6} | 6^{5}
(Thailand) T Tanasugarn | 7^{8} | 7^{7}
(Germany) J Kandarr | 0 | 3
4 | (United States) V Williams | 6 | 6

Second round
11 | (Germany) A Huber | 7^{7} | 6
(United States) C Morariu | 6^{5} | 1
Q | (Poland) M Grzybowska | 6 | 6
(United States) E deLone | 3 | 4
(Germany) M Babel | 4 | 1
WC | (France) É Loit | 6 | 6
(Thailand) T Tanasugarn | 2 | 2
4 | (United States) V Williams | 6 | 6

Third round
11 | (Germany) A Huber | 6 | 6
Q | (Poland) M Grzybowska | 2 | 2
WC | (France) É Loit | 2 | 2
4 | (United States) V Williams | 6 | 6

Fourth round
11 | (Germany) A Huber | 6^{4} | 2
4 | (United States) V Williams | 7^{7} | 6

==== Section 7 ====
First round
5 | (Spain) C Martínez | 6 | 6
(Russia) A Jidkova | 2 | 3
(Zimbabwe) C Black | 2 | 7^{7} | 6
(Russia) A Myskina | 6 | 6^{4} | 2
(Australia) A Molik | 4 | 2
WC | (France) S Foretz | 6 | 6
(Italy) S Farina | 6 | 6
(Spain) M Sánchez Lorenzo | 3 | 1
(Japan) A Sugiyama | 6 | 3 | 6
(Belgium) K Clijsters | 2 | 6 | 2
(Czech Republic) A Gerši | 6 | 6
Q | (Romania) C Cristea | 4 | 3
(Austria) S Plischke | 6 | 6
(Croatia) M Lučić | 2 | 0
(Canada) V Webb | 4 | 4
14 | (Russia) A Kournikova | 6 | 6

Second round
5 | (Spain) C Martínez | 4 | 7 | 6
(Zimbabwe) C Black | 6 | 5 | 4
WC | (France) S Foretz | 4 | 7^{7} | 3
(Italy) S Farina | 6 | 6^{4} | 6
(Japan) A Sugiyama | 6 | 7^{7}
(Czech Republic) A Gerši | 3 | 6^{5}
(Austria) S Plischke | 6 | 4 | 6
14 | (Russia) A Kournikova | 2 | 6 | 3

Third round
5 | (Spain) C Martínez | 6 | 6
(Italy) S Farina | 1 | 0
(Japan) A Sugiyama | 6 | 6
(Austria) S Plischke | 4 | 1

Fourth round
5 | (Spain) C Martínez | 5 | 6 | 6
(Japan) A Sugiyama | 7 | 3 | 4

==== Section 8 ====
First round
9 | (South Africa) A Coetzer | 6 | 6
(Canada) M Drake | 0 | 4
(Spain) G León García | 7^{7} | 6
LL | (Russia) L Krasnoroutskaya | 6^{4} | 1
(Switzerland) M Vavrinec | 4 | 6^{6}
Q | (Paraguay) R de los Ríos | 6 | 7^{8}
(South Africa) M de Swardt | 6 | 6^{2} | 3
(Germany) M Weingärtner | 1 | 7^{7} | 6
Q | (Ukraine) T Kovalchuk | 4 | 1
(Luxembourg) A Kremer | 6 | 6
Q | (Germany) A Bachmann | 3 | 6^{5}
(France) A-G Sidot | 6 | 7^{7}
Q | (Spain) M Marrero | 6 | 6
(Romania) I Spîrlea | 3 | 4
(Belgium) D Van Roost | 6^{5} | 6 | 6
2 | (United States) L Davenport | 7^{7} | 4 | 3

Second round
9 | (South Africa) A Coetzer | 6 | 6
(Spain) G León García | 3 | 1
Q | (Paraguay) R de los Ríos | 6 | 6
(Germany) M Weingärtner | 0 | 1
(Luxembourg) A Kremer | 4 | 6 | 1
(France) A-G Sidot | 6 | 4 | 6
Q | (Spain) M Marrero | 0 | 7 | 7
(Belgium) D Van Roost | 6 | 5 | 5

Third round
9 | (South Africa) A Coetzer | 5 | 7^{7} | 4
Q | (Paraguay) R de los Ríos | 7 | 6^{4} | 6
(France) A-G Sidot | 6^{0} | 2
Q | (Spain) M Marrero | 7^{7} | 6

Fourth round
Q | (Paraguay) R de los Ríos | 6 | 0 | 4
Q | (Spain) M Marrero | 4 | 6 | 6

| Preceded by 2000 Australian Open – Women's singles | Grand Slam women's singles | Succeeded by 2000 Wimbledon Championships – Women's singles |
