= Mary Pierce =

French tennis player (born 1975)

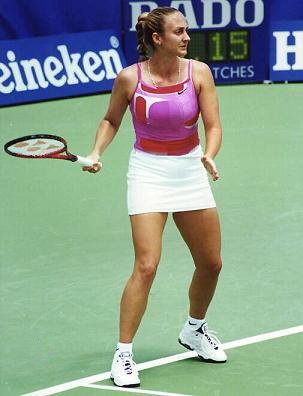
- Mary Pierce, 2001
- Country (sports): France
- Residence: Rivière Noire, Mauritius
- Born: 15 January 1975 (age 51) Montreal, Canada
- Height: 1.78 m (5 ft 10 in)
- Turned pro: March 1989
- Plays: Right-handed (two-handed backhand)
- Prize money: $9,793,119
- Int. Tennis HoF: 2019 (member page)

Singles
- Career record: 511–237
- Career titles: 18
- Highest ranking: No. 3 (30 January 1995)

Grand Slam singles results
- Australian Open: W (1995)
- French Open: W (2000)
- Wimbledon: QF (1996, 2005)
- US Open: F (2005)

Other tournaments
- Grand Slam Cup: QF (1999)
- Tour Finals: F (1997, 2005)
- Olympic Games: QF (2004)

Doubles
- Career record: 197–116
- Career titles: 10
- Highest ranking: No. 3 (10 July 2000)

Grand Slam doubles results
- Australian Open: F (2000)
- French Open: W (2000)
- Wimbledon: 3R (2002, 2004)
- US Open: SF (1999)

Other doubles tournaments
- Olympic Games: 2R (1996, 2004)

Mixed doubles
- Career titles: 1

Grand Slam mixed doubles results
- Australian Open: 1R (1993)
- French Open: QF (1990, 1992)
- Wimbledon: W (2005)
- US Open: SF (1995)

Team competitions
- Fed Cup: W (1997, 2003)
- Hopman Cup: F (1998)

Mary Caroline Pierce (born 15 January 1975) is a French former professional tennis player. She was ranked world No. 3 in singles and in doubles by the Women's Tennis Association (WTA). Pierce won 18 singles titles on the WTA Tour, including two majors at the 1995 Australian Open and the 2000 French Open, and five Tier I singles events. Pierce was a finalist at a further four singles majors, and twice at the Tour Finals.

In doubles, Pierce won 10 doubles titles on the WTA Tour, including two major titles at the 2000 French Open in women's doubles partnering Martina Hingis, and at the 2005 Wimbledon Championships in mixed doubles partnering Mahesh Bhupathi. She was also a runner-up in women's doubles at the 2000 Australian Open, partnering Hingis.

Pierce was inducted into the International Tennis Hall of Fame in 2019. She is the most recent Frenchwoman to win the French Open singles title.

== Personal life ==
Mary Pierce was born in Montreal, Quebec, Canada, to Yannick Adjaj and Jim Pierce. Her mother is French and her father American, qualifying Pierce for citizenship in all three countries. She was raised in the United States and represented France in international tennis competitions. She speaks English and French fluently, and lives in Mauritius as of May 2019.

Pierce was briefly engaged to baseball player Roberto Alomar in 1999 and later to Air France pilot David Emmanuel Ades, but broke off both engagements.

Pierce had a difficult relationship with her father, who developed a reputation as an abusive tennis father, threatening and even attacking her as well as others. Pierce refused to speak with him for a while and even employed two bodyguards to keep him at bay —and the Women's Tennis Association introduced the "Jim Pierce rule" that made it possible to ban parents and coaches from tournaments— but later, the two were eventually reconciled sometime after she retired from active professional tennis.

Pierce is a born-again Christian. After a loss in early months of 2000 (before the French Open which she would win), she said she felt "empty and miserable", but then "I gave my life to Jesus and was born again... things in me changed instantly." Pierce also credits this change in spiritual direction to her pre-existing friendship with another tennis pro, Linda Wild.

== Career ==
=== Early years ===
Pierce started playing tennis at the age of ten. Two years after being introduced to tennis, for girls aged 12 and under she was ranked No. 2 in the country. In April 1989 at a WTA tournament in Hilton Head, Pierce became the youngest American player (prior to Jennifer Capriati in 1990) to make her debut on the professional tour, aged 14 years and 2 months. Due to her physicality and aggressive approach, her ballstriking was compared to that of Capriati, and she quickly gained a reputation for being one of the hardest hitters on the women's circuit. Her dad developed an interest in the sport, and became her coach for many years. She won her first WTA Tour singles tournament in July 1991 in Palermo by defeating Sandra Cecchini in the final.

=== 1994–2003 ===
In July 1993, Pierce successfully filed for a restraining order against her father, who was known to be verbally abusive to his daughter and her opponents, and was banned by the WTA from attending her tournaments. Following this split from her father, Pierce was coached by Nick Bollettieri, whose tennis academy she had briefly attended as a teenager in 1988. Her brother David was also Pierce's regular coach until 2006. German Aguero, founder of Future Tennis Camps, can also be credited with Pierce's early success as he took her in for several years and coached her free of charge.

Pierce reached her first Grand Slam singles final at the 1994 French Open. She conceded just ten games en route to the final, which included a 6–2, 6–2 defeat of world No. 1, Steffi Graf, in the semifinals. In the final, however, Pierce lost to Arantxa Sánchez Vicario in straight sets.

The following year, Pierce won her first Grand Slam title for France by defeating Sánchez Vicario in straight sets in the final of the 1995 Australian Open and lost just 30 games in the whole tournament in becoming the first Canadian-born tennis player to win a singles Grand Slam. She reached her career-high singles ranking of world No. 3 that year. Pierce also won the Japan Open, defeating Sánchez Vicario in the final.

Pierce suffered a series of setbacks in 1996, including her split with Nick Bollettieri, after failing to defend her title at the Australian Open. Aside from a runner-up finish at the Bausch & Lomb Championships in Amelia Island and a semifinal finish in Hamburg, the highlight of the year for Pierce was her first appearance in the Wimbledon quarterfinals.

Pierce was back in the Australian Open singles final in 1997, where she lost to Martina Hingis in straight sets. She also lost in that year's WTA Tour Championships final to Jana Novotná. Pierce was a member of the French team that won the 1997 Fed Cup, and her only title that season was the Italian Open, defeating Conchita Martínez in the final. Pierce won the Comeback Player of the Year award for ending the year at world No. 7 after starting at world No. 21.

She won four titles in 1998: the Paris indoor event, the Amelia Island Championships, the Kremlin Cup, and the Luxembourg Open. In addition, she was runner-up at the San Diego Classic.

Pierce won her second Grand Slam singles title and her first Grand Slam doubles title at the 2000 French Open. In the singles final, she defeated Martínez to become the first French woman to claim the title since Françoise Dürr in 1967. She also partnered with Hingis to win the women's doubles crown, their second Grand Slam tournament of the year after the Australian Open. Her ranking dropped to No. 130 at the end of 2001 and reached almost 300 in April 2002.

Pierce helped France win the Fed Cup for a second time in 2003 by defeating the United States in the final.

=== 2004–2005 ===
After a few quiet years on the tour, Pierce won her first title since the 2000 French Open at the Rosmalen Open on grass in 2004. At the Olympics in Athens, Pierce defeated sixth-seeded Venus Williams in the third round before losing to top-seeded and eventual gold-medallist Justine Henin of Belgium in the quarterfinals. At the US Open later in the year, Pierce defeated recent Wimbledon champion Maria Sharapova, before losing to eventual champion Svetlana Kuznetsova in the fourth round.

Pierce then made it back into the top ranks of the women's game in 2005. At the French Open, she reached the singles final for the third time, where she lost to Henin in straight sets, losing 1–6, 1–6 in just over one hour. She then reached the quarterfinals of Wimbledon for the first time since 1996. Pierce faced Venus Williams in that quarterfinal and lost the match after a second set tiebreak consisting of 22 points. Pierce also won the mixed-doubles title at Wimbledon, partnering Mahesh Bhupathi. In August, she won her first singles title of the year at the Acura Classic in San Diego, defeating Ai Sugiyama in the final.

In the fourth round of the US Open, Pierce defeated Henin for the first time in her career. In the quarterfinals, she beat third seeded Amélie Mauresmo to reach her first US Open semifinal. After the victory, Pierce remarked, "I'm 30 and I have been on the tour for 17 years and there are still firsts for me. That's pretty amazing." She reached the final by defeating Elena Dementieva in three sets in the semifinals, taking a medical time-out after the first set. This caused controversy, many believing that this disrupted Dementieva's rhythm and concentration. In the final, she lost to Kim Clijsters in straight sets. But Pierce won her second title of the year at the Kremlin Cup in Moscow. In her quarterfinal match against Elena Likhovtseva, Pierce came back from 0–6, and thus six match points, in the third set tiebreak and won eight consecutive points to reach the semifinals.

The win in Moscow secured her spot at the year-ending championships in Los Angeles where the top eight singles players competed for the winner's prize of one million dollars. In round-robin play with her assigned group of four players, she won all three matches: against Clijsters in three sets; Mauresmo in three sets; and Dementieva in straight sets. In the semifinals, Pierce beat top-ranked Lindsay Davenport in two tiebreaks; however, Pierce lost the final to Mauresmo in a match lasting just over three hours.

Pierce's year-end ranking was world No. 5 compared to her year-beginning ranking of world No. 29. This matched her career-best performances of 1994, 1995, and 1999, and she was less than 200 points behind Sharapova for world No. 4 and less than 300 points behind Mauresmo for world No. 3. Pierce's return to form in 2005 was one of the surprising tennis stories of the year. Her successful performance in 2005 also encouraged the former world No. 1 player, Martina Hingis, to return to the game.

=== 2006 ===
Pierce trained hard in the off-season in a bid to win major titles in 2006. Her first tournament of the year was the Australian Open. She defeated Nicole Pratt of Australia in the first round before losing to Iveta Benešová of the Czech Republic in the second round. The loss denied her a third-round match with Martina Hingis. Pierce reached the final of her next tournament, the Gaz de France in Paris, where she lost to compatriot Amélie Mauresmo in straight sets. Pierce did not play again until August because of foot and groin injuries, withdrawing from the French Open and Wimbledon.

After spending six months away from the tour, Pierce began her comeback at the Acura Classic, where she was the 2005 champion. She lost in the quarterfinals to Maria Sharapova. In just her second tournament in over six months, Pierce played at the US Open and lost to Li Na, the 24th seed from China, in the third round. Pierce then lost in the first round of the next three tournaments she played. She was defeated at the Luxembourg Open by Alona Bondarenko, who went on to win the title. Jelena Janković defeated Pierce in Stuttgart and Katarina Srebotnik defeated Pierce at the Zurich Open.

==== Knee injury ====
At the Generali Ladies Linz tournament in October 2006, Pierce defeated Ai Sugiyama in the first round and was leading against Vera Zvonareva 6–4, 6–5 in the second round when she ruptured the anterior cruciate ligament in her left knee. She had held three match points before the injury. Pierce underwent a successful operation in December 2006 and missed all of 2007. She was expected to return to the tour in 2008, but at the end of that year she was still sidelined with no projected return date. However, she stated that she was still not ready to retire.

Pierce made an appearance at the 2007 French Open as an avenue at Roland Garros was named in her honor – Allée Mary Pierce. She also helped with the social side to the French Open, taking part in the post-match ceremony after the women's final. Pierce was named as a member of the French Olympic team for the 2008 Beijing Olympics. On 21 July 2008, however, Pierce withdrew from the Olympics because of injury.

As of October 2013, Pierce lives in Black River, Mauritius, where she teaches tennis.

== Playing style ==
Pierce was an aggressive baseline player who had a reputation for being one of the hardest hitters on the WTA tour and would dictate a match from the first point. Her greatest strength was her forehand, which was hit hard and flat and could be used to hit winners from any position on the court. Her two-handed backhand was similarly hit flat and was used to attack weak second serves and create sharp angles around the court. Her first serve was powerful, typically being served at 104 mph (167 km/h) and being recorded as high as 116 mph (187 km/h), meaning that she aced frequently. Pierce also possessed an effective kick serve which was frequently deployed as a second serve, typically averaging 86 mph (138 km/h). She was one of the most aggressive players on return and could hit return winners at will. She was one of the least defensive players on the tour, predicating her game on raw power and aggression. Pierce's major weakness was her inconsistency. When she was in good form, she was one of the most dangerous players on the tour, accumulating high numbers of winners to a low number of unforced errors. In poor form, however, her aggressive game led to a high number of unforced errors. Her game was also heavily affected by nerves, and, when nervous, she would take increasingly long amounts of time preparing between points. Pierce's preferred surfaces were clay and hard courts.

== Equipment ==
In the early 2000s, Pierce wore Nike apparel and used Yonex racquets on court.

== Career statistics ==
=== Grand Slam singles performance timeline ===
Key
W	F	SF	QF	#R	RR	Q#	P#	DNQ	A	Z#	PO	G	S	B	NMS	NTI	P	NH

(W) winner; (F) finalist; (SF) semifinalist; (QF) quarterfinalist; (#R) rounds 4, 3, 2, 1; (RR) round-robin stage; (Q#) qualification round; (P#) preliminary round; (DNQ) did not qualify; (A) absent; (Z#) Davis/Fed Cup Zonal Group (with number indication) or (PO) play-off; (G) gold, (S) silver or (B) bronze Olympic/Paralympic medal; (NMS) not a Masters tournament; (NTI) not a Tier I tournament; (P) postponed; (NH) not held; (SR) strike rate (events won / competed); (W–L) win–loss record.
To avoid confusion and double counting, these charts are updated at the conclusion of a tournament or when the player's participation has ended.

Tournament	1990	1991	1992	1993	1994	1995	1996	1997	1998	1999	2000	2001	2002	2003	2004	2005	2006	SR	W–L
Australian Open	A	A	A	QF	4R	W	2R	F	QF	QF	4R	3R	1R	2R	A	1R	2R	1 / 13	36–12
French Open	2R	3R	4R	4R	F	4R	3R	4R	2R	2R	W	A	QF	1R	3R	F	A	1 / 15	44–14
Wimbledon	A	A	A	A	A	2R	QF	4R	1R	4R	2R	A	3R	4R	1R	QF	A	0 / 10	21–10
US Open	Q3	3R	4R	4R	QF	3R	A	4R	4R	QF	4R	A	1R	4R	4R	F	3R	0 / 14	41–14
Win–loss	1–1	4–2	6–2	10–3	13–3	13–3	7–3	15–4	8–4	12–4	14–3	2–1	6–4	7–4	5–3	16–4	3–2	2 / 52	142–50

=== Grand Slam finals ===
==== Singles: 6 (2 titles, 4 runner-ups) ====
Result	Year	Championship	Surface	Opponent	Score
Loss	1994	French Open	Clay	(Spain) Arantxa Sánchez Vicario	4–6, 4–6
Win	1995	Australian Open	Hard	(Spain) Arantxa Sánchez Vicario	6–3, 6–2
Loss	1997	Australian Open	Hard	(Switzerland) Martina Hingis	2–6, 2–6
Win	2000	French Open	Clay	(Spain) Conchita Martínez	6–2, 7–5
Loss	2005	French Open	Clay	(Belgium) Justine Henin	1–6, 1–6
Loss	2005	US Open	Hard	(Belgium) Kim Clijsters	3–6, 1–6

==== Doubles: 2 (1 title, 1 runner–up) ====
Result	Year	Championship	Surface	Partner	Opponents	Score
Loss	2000	Australian Open	Hard	(Switzerland) Martina Hingis	(United States) Lisa Raymond (Australia) Rennae Stubbs	4–6, 7–5, 4–6
Win	2000	French Open	Clay	(Switzerland) Martina Hingis	(Spain) Virginia Ruano Pascual (Argentina) Paola Suárez	6–2, 6–4

==== Mixed doubles: 1 (1 title) ====
Result	Year	Championship	Surface	Partner	Opponents	Score
Win	2005	Wimbledon	Grass	(India) Mahesh Bhupathi	(Ukraine) Tatiana Perebiynis (Australia) Paul Hanley	6–4, 6–2
