= 2000 French Open =

- Date: 29 May – 11 June 2000
- Edition: 99
- Category: 70th Grand Slam (ITF)
- Surface: Clay
- Location: Paris (XVI^{e}), France
- Venue: Stade Roland Garros

Champions

Men's singles
- (Brazil) Gustavo Kuerten

Women's singles
- (France) Mary Pierce

Men's doubles
- (Australia) Todd Woodbridge / (Australia) Mark Woodforde

Women's doubles
- (Switzerland) Martina Hingis / (France) Mary Pierce

Mixed doubles
- (South Africa) Mariaan de Swardt / (South Africa) David Adams
- French Open

The 2000 French Open was a tennis tournament that took place on the outdoor clay courts at the Stade Roland Garros in Paris, France. The tournament was held from 29 May until 11 June. It was the 99th staging of the French Open, and the second Grand Slam tennis event of 2000.

== Seniors ==
=== Men's singles ===
(Brazil) Gustavo Kuerten defeated (Sweden) Magnus Norman, 6–2, 6–3, 2–6, 7–6^{(8–6)}

• It was Kuerten's 2nd career Grand Slam singles title and his 2nd title at the French Open. It was Kuerten's 3rd title of the year, and his 8th overall.

=== Women's singles ===
(France) Mary Pierce defeated (Spain) Conchita Martínez, 6–2, 7–5

• It was Pierce's 2nd and last career Grand Slam singles title and her 1st title at the French Open. It was Pierce's 2nd title of the year, and her 15th overall.

=== Men's doubles ===
(Australia) Todd Woodbridge / (Australia) Mark Woodforde defeated (Netherlands) Paul Haarhuis / (Australia) Sandon Stolle, 7–6^{(9–7)}, 6–4

• It was Woodbridge's 10th career Grand Slam doubles title and his 1st and only title at the French Open.
• It was Woodforde's 11th career Grand Slam doubles title and his 1st and only title at the French Open.

=== Women's doubles ===
(Switzerland) Martina Hingis / (France) Mary Pierce defeated (Spain) Virginia Ruano / (Argentina) Paola Suárez, 6–2, 6–4

• It was Hingis' 8th career Grand Slam doubles title and her 2nd and last title at the French Open.
• It was Pierce's 1st and only career Grand Slam doubles title.

=== Mixed doubles ===
(South Africa) Mariaan de Swardt / (South Africa) David Adams defeated (Australia) Rennae Stubbs / (Australia) Todd Woodbridge, 6–3, 3–6, 6–3

• It was de Swardt's 2nd and last career Grand Slam mixed doubles title and her 1st title at the French Open.
• It was Adams's 2nd and last career Grand Slam mixed doubles title and his 1st title at the French Open.

== Juniors ==
=== Boys' singles ===
(France) Paul-Henri Mathieu defeated (Spain) Tommy Robredo, 3–6, 7–6^{(7–3)}, 6–2

=== Girls' singles ===
(France) Virginie Razzano defeated (Argentina) María Emilia Salerni, 5–7, 6–4, 8–6

=== Boys' doubles ===
(Spain) Marc López / (Spain) Tommy Robredo defeated (Sweden) Joachim Johansson / (United States) Andy Roddick, 7–6^{(7–2)}, 6–0

=== Girls' doubles ===
(Spain) Maria José Martinez / (Spain) Anabel Medina Garrigues defeated (Croatia) Matea Mezak / (Russia) Dinara Safina, 6–0, 6–1

== Prize money ==
Event		W	F	SF	QF	4R	3R	2R	1R
Singles	Men	FF4,240,000	FF2,120,000	FF1,060,000	FF560,000	FF300,000	FF173,500	FF105,000	FF63,000
Singles	Women	FF4,028,000	FF2,014,000	FF1,007,000	FF532,000	FF270,000	FF156,150	FF94,500	FF56,700

Total prize money for the event was FF69,163,000.

== Notes ==
Preceded by 2000 Australian Open	Grand Slams	Succeeded by 2000 Wimbledon Championships
