= Mario Tudor =

Croatian tennis player

- Country (sports): Croatia
- Born: 13 July 1978 (age 47)
- Plays: Right-Handed
- Prize money: US $9,594

Singles
- Career record: 0–0
- Career titles: 0
- Highest ranking: No. 601 (15 September 1997)

Doubles
- Career record: 1–3
- Career titles: 0
- Highest ranking: No. 385 (27 October 1997)

Coaching career
- Milos Raonic (2019–2024); Laslo Djere (2025–)

Coaching achievements
- Coachee singles titles total: 1

Mario Tudor (born 13 July 1978) is a Croatian tennis coach and former professional player. Tudor achieved a career-high ranking of No. 601 in singles and No. 385 in doubles.

== Tennis career ==
Tudor's best result on the ATP Tour came in doubles at the 1997 Croatian Indoors, where he partnered with compatriot Goran Orešić to reach the quarterfinals after receiving a wildcard entry.

In 2001, Tudor was the hitting partner of Goran Ivanišević during his Wimbledon title run and later partnered with him in doubles at the Stuttgart Masters, where they entered the tournament as wildcard recipients and were defeated in the first round.

== Coaching career ==
From 2019 to 2024, he coached Canadian player Milos Raonic. In 2025, he became the coach of Serbian player Laslo Djere.
