= Saša Hiršzon =

Croatian tennis player (born 1972)

- Country (sports): (Socialist Federal Republic of Yugoslavia) Yugoslavia (until 1991); Croatia (from 1991)
- Born: 14 July 1972 (age 53) Varaždin, SR Croatia, SFR Yugoslavia
- Height: 1.85 m (6 ft 1 in)
- Plays: Right-handed
- Prize money: $312,767

Singles
- Career record: 10–25
- Career titles: 0
- Highest ranking: No. 214 (20 December 1993)

Grand Slam singles results
- Australian Open: Q2 (1990)
- French Open: Q2 (1994)
- Wimbledon: Q1 (1997)

Doubles
- Career record: 41–39
- Career titles: 2
- Highest ranking: No. 85 (28 July 1997)

Grand Slam doubles results
- French Open: 1R (1997)
- Wimbledon: 3R (1997)
- US Open: 2R (1996)

Team competitions
- Davis Cup: 11–12

Saša Hiršzon (born 14 July 1972) is a former professional tennis player from Croatia and current tennis coach. His highest world rankings were No. 214 in singles on 20 December 1993, and No. 85 in doubles on 28 July 1997.

== Early life ==
Hiršzon was born in Varaždin. His grandfather Božidar Hirschsohn was a notable Croatian Jewish stage actor in Varaždin who fought with the Partisans during World War II. All members of Hiršzon's paternal family, except his grandfather, perished during the Holocaust.

== Tennis career ==
Hiršzon started to play tennis at the Varaždin local tennis club. He won the national titles in the under-12, −14, −16, −18 categories. Hiršzon stated that under-12 match against Michael Chang stayed etched in his memory the most. As he did not have much money, Hiršzon came into the field with different rackets while Chang had a whole team behind him.

Best known as a doubles player, Hiršzon had most of his success when partnering countryman Goran Ivanišević. The pair appeared together in the 1996 US Open and 1997 French Open, but only won one match, in the former. They did however win two titles on the ATP Tour, the first in 1995, at a French tournament called the Grand Prix Passing Shot Bordeaux. They won their second title on home soil, at the Croatian Indoors in 1997. It would be the only two finals that the pairing reached during their careers although they did make the semi-finals of the 1993 Austrian Open, the 1996 Eurocard Open in Stuttgart and Munich's 1998 BMW Open. The Eurocard Open was one of the tour's Mercedes Super 9 (now Masters) events and the semi-final came down to a third set tiebreak, but the Croatians were unable to defeat Jacco Eltingh and Paul Haarhuis.

Hiršzon and Ivanišević also played together at the 1996 Atlanta Olympics, reaching the quarter-finals, where they were eliminated by eventual bronze medalists, David Prinosil and Marc-Kevin Goellner, from Germany. The Croatians had made it into the quarter-finals with wins over Jonas Björkman/Nicklas Kulti, the fourth seeds, followed by a victory over the Bahamian pairing of Mark Knowles and Roger Smith.

As a singles player he didn't make an impression on the ATP Tour, but did have a win over world number 17 Guillermo Pérez Roldán at Prague in 1990, although the Argentine did have to retire hurt.

His third and final Grand Slam appearance was in the 1997 Wimbledon Championships, with a new partner, Sander Groen. They made it into the round of 16.

He played nine Davis Cup ties for Croatia, from 1994 to 1998. On his debut in 1994, he helped Croatia gain promotion to the World Group, with a good performance in their Euro/African semi-final against Norway. He won the fifth and deciding rubber against Helge Koll-Frafjord, in straight sets, having earlier teamed up with Ivanišević to win a close doubles match, won 11–9 in the final set. His best singles win was over Australian Jason Stoltenberg in 1996, then number 26 in the world. By the end of his Davis Cup career he had won 11 matches for Croatia, six as a singles player and five in the doubles.

== ATP career finals ==
=== Doubles: 2 (2–0) ===
Result	W-L	Date	Tournament	Surface	Partner	Opponent	Score
Win	1–0	Sep 1995	Bordeaux, France	Hard	(Croatia) Goran Ivanišević	(Sweden) Henrik Holm (United Kingdom) Danny Sapsford	6–3, 6–4
Win	2–0	Feb 1997	Zagreb, Croatia	Carpet	(Croatia) Goran Ivanišević	(South Africa) Brent Haygarth (United States) Mark Keil	6–4, 6–3

== Challenger titles ==
=== Doubles: (2) ===
No.	Year	Tournament	Surface	Partner	Opponent	Score
1.	1993	Montauban, France	Clay	(Norway) Christian Ruud	(Italy) Massimo Cierro (Italy) Ugo Colombini	6–1, 6–2
2.	1995	Heilbronn, Germany	Carpet	(Croatia) Goran Ivanišević	(Germany) Martin Sinner (Netherlands) Joost Winnink	6–4, 6–4

== See also ==
- List of select Jewish tennis players

== Bibliography ==
- Dretar, Milivoj (2010). Židovi u ludbreškom kraju. Ludbreg: Pučko otvoreno učilište "Dragutin Novak". ISBN 978-953-7624-00-2.
