= Fredrik Bergh (tennis) =

Swedish tennis player

- Country (sports): Sweden
- Residence: Båstad
- Born: 22 April 1975 (age 51) Karlskoga, Sweden
- Height: 6 ft 4 in (193 cm)
- Turned pro: 1996
- Plays: Right-handed
- Prize money: $126,618

Singles
- Career record: 0-2
- Career titles: 0
- Highest ranking: No. 297 (7 Apr 1997)

Doubles
- Career record: 22-20
- Career titles: 0
- Highest ranking: No. 71 (28 Sep 1998)

Grand Slam doubles results
- French Open: 3R (1998)
- Wimbledon: 2R (2000)
- US Open: 3R (1998, 2000)

Mixed doubles

Grand Slam mixed doubles results
- French Open: 3R (2000)
- Wimbledon: 1R (2000)

Fredrik Bergh (born 22 April 1975) is a former professional tennis player from Sweden.

Bergh, a doubles specialist, appeared in five Grand Slam tournaments. He partnered Peter Nyborg in four of them and the pair never failed to make it past the first round. At the 2000 French Open he made the third round of the mixed doubles, with Meghann Shaughnessy.

He had his best year in 1998, reaching the final of two events on the ATP Tour, in Prague and Split. Also that year, Bergh and partner Sander Groen had a win over the world's top ranked doubles pairing of Jacco Eltingh and Paul Haarhuis, in Halle.

== ATP career finals ==
=== Doubles: 2 (0–2) ===
Result	W/L	Date	Tournament	Surface	Partner	Opponents	Score
Loss	0–1	Feb 1998	Split, Croatia	Carpet (i)	(Sweden) Patrik Fredriksson	(Czech Republic) Martin Damm (Czech Republic) Jiří Novák	6–7, 2–6
Loss	0–2	May 1998	Prague, Czech Republic	Clay	(Sweden) Nicklas Kulti	(Australia) Wayne Arthurs (Australia) Andrew Kratzmann	1–6, 1–6
