= Patrik Fredriksson =

Swedish tennis player

- Country (sports): Sweden
- Born: 16 May 1973 (age 53) Huskvarna, Sweden
- Height: 1.85 m (6 ft 1 in)
- Turned pro: 1994
- Plays: Right-handed
- Prize money: $331,508

Singles
- Career record: 9–30
- Career titles: 0; 3 Challenger, 4 Futures
- Highest ranking: No. 84 (13 January 1997)

Grand Slam singles results
- Australian Open: 1R (1996, 1997)
- French Open: 1R (1996, 1997)
- Wimbledon: 1R (1997)
- US Open: 1R (1997)

Doubles
- Career record: 15–16
- Career titles: 0; 0 Challenger, 1 Futures
- Highest ranking: No. 110 (28 July 1997)

Grand Slam doubles results
- Wimbledon: Q1 (1997)
- US Open: 2R (1997)

Patrik Fredriksson (born 16 May 1973) is a former professional tennis player from Sweden. He was ranked 84 ATP ranking in singles as his best. He has won 7 professional singles titles and 1 doubles title on the tour. He stopped playing professionally 2001. Between 2002 and 2004 he was the Davis Cup coach and head coach for the national tennis team in Kuwait. Kuwait reached group 1 in Davis cup

== Career ==
Fredriksson, who reached a career high ranking of 84 in the world, never made it past the first round of a Grand Slam singles draw. The closest he came was in the 1997 French Open when he lost a five set match to Frédéric Fontang. In the doubles however he reached the second round in his only attempt, at the 1997 US Open, with Tom Vanhoudt as his partner.

He was twice a singles quarter-finalist on the ATP Tour, in the 1996 Stockholm Open and at the Swedish Open in 1997. At Singapore in 1996 he had a win over world number 26 and third seed Paul Haarhuis. As a doubles career player he was runner-up at two ATP Tour events.

== ATP career finals ==
=== Doubles: 2 (2 runner-ups) ===
Legend Grand Slam Tournaments (0–0) ATP World Tour Finals (0–0) ATP Masters Series (0–0) ATP Championship Series (0–0) ATP World Series (0–2)	Finals by surface Hard (0–1) Clay (0–0) Grass (0–0) Carpet (0–1)	Finals by setting Outdoors (0–1) Indoors (0–1)

Result	W–L	Date	Tournament	Tier	Surface	Partner	Opponents	Score
Loss	0–1	Jan 1997	Doha, Qatar	World Series	Hard	(Sweden) Magnus Norman	(Netherlands) Jacco Eltingh (Netherlands) Paul Haarhuis	3–6, 2–6
Loss	0–2	Feb 1998	Split, Croatia	World Series	Carpet	(Sweden) Fredrik Bergh	(Czech Republic) Martin Damm (Czech Republic) Jiří Novák	6–7, 2–6

== ATP Challenger and ITF Futures finals ==
=== Singles: 10 (7–3) ===
Legend ATP Challenger (3–2) ITF Futures (4–1)	Finals by surface Hard (4–0) Clay (3–2) Grass (0–0) Carpet (0–1)

Result	W–L	Date	Tournament	Tier	Surface	Opponent	Score
Loss	0-1	Feb 1996	Lippstadt, Germany	Challenger	Carpet	(Germany) Hendrik Dreekmann	3–6, 4–6
Win	1-1	May 1996	Dresden, Germany	Challenger	Clay	(Spain) Galo Blanco	6–4, 6–4
Win	2-1	Oct 1996	Tanagura, Japan	Challenger	Hard	(Canada) Albert Chang	6–1, 5–7, 6–4
Loss	2-2	Oct 1996	Seoul, South Korea	Challenger	Clay	(Brazil) Jaime Oncins	6–1, 1–6, 2–6
Win	3-2	Nov 1996	Reunion Island, Reunion	Challenger	Hard	(France) Thierry Champion	5–7, 6–0, 6–3
Win	4-2	Mar 1998	Greece F1, Seros	Futures	Hard	(Sweden) Fredrik Lovén	6–2, 6–2
Win	5-2	Mar 1998	Greece F2, Kalamata	Futures	Hard	(Switzerland) Lorenzo Manta	6–2, 6–1
Win	6-2	Apr 1999	Great Britain F4, Hatfield	Futures	Clay	(France) Jean-Rene Lisnard	7–6, 2–6, 7–6
Loss	6-3	May 1999	Great Britain F6, Newcastle	Futures	Clay	(United Kingdom) Luke Milligan	4–6, 4–6
Win	7-3	May 1999	Great Britain F7, Edinburgh	Futures	Clay	(Russia) Yuri Schukin	6–4, 6–4

=== Doubles: 5 (1–4) ===
Legend ATP Challenger (0–3) ITF Futures (1–1)	Finals by surface Hard (1–1) Clay (0–3) Grass (0–0) Carpet (0–0)

Result	W–L	Date	Tournament	Tier	Surface	Partner	Opponents	Score
Loss	0–1	Mar 1996	Agadir, Morocco	Challenger	Clay	(Sweden) Magnus Norman	(United States) Jared Palmer (South Africa) Christo van Rensburg	6–3, 3–6, 2–6
Loss	0–2	Sep 1996	Prostějov, Czech Republic	Challenger	Clay	(Sweden) Fredrik Bergh	(Germany) Mathias Huning (United States) Jack Waite	3–6, 6–7
Loss	0–3	Oct 1996	Seoul, South Korea	Challenger	Clay	(Sweden) Fredrik Bergh	(South Korea) Lee Hyung-Taik (South Korea) Yoon Yong-Il	4–6, 4–6
Loss	0–4	Mar 1998	Greece F1, Seros	Futures	Hard	(Sweden) Fredrik Lovén	(Sweden) Fredrik Bergh (Sweden) Jan Hermansson	3–6, 2–6
Win	1–4	Apr 2003	Kuwait F1, Mishref	Futures	Hard	(Sweden) Kalle Flygt	(United Kingdom) Amadeus Fulford-Jones (Iran) Ramin Raziyani	6–2, 6–2

== Performance timeline ==
Key
W	F	SF	QF	#R	RR	Q#	DNQ	A	NH

(W) winner; (F) finalist; (SF) semifinalist; (QF) quarterfinalist; (#R) rounds 4, 3, 2, 1; (RR) round-robin stage; (Q#) qualification round; (DNQ) did not qualify; (A) absent; (NH) not held; (SR) strike rate (events won / competed); (W–L) win–loss record.

=== Singles ===
Tournament	1995	1996	1997	1998	1999	2000	2001	SR	W–L	Win%
Grand Slam tournaments
Australian Open	A	1R	1R	A	Q1	A	A	0 / 2	0–2	0%
French Open	Q2	1R	1R	Q2	Q1	A	A	0 / 2	0–2	0%
Wimbledon	Q2	A	1R	A	A	A	Q2	0 / 1	0–1	0%
US Open	A	A	1R	A	A	A	A	0 / 1	0–1	0%
Win–loss	0–0	0–2	0–4	0–0	0–0	0–0	0–0	0 / 6	0–6	0%
ATP World Tour Masters 1000
Monte Carlo	A	1R	A	A	A	A	A	0 / 1	0–1	0%
Win–loss	0–0	0–1	0–0	0–0	0–0	0–0	0–0	0 / 1	0–1	0%
