= 2001 French Open – Women's singles qualifying =

Women's singles qualifying
- 2001 French Open

Events
Singles	men	women		boys	girls
Doubles	men	women	mixed	boys	girls
WC Singles	men	women	quad
WC Doubles	men	women	quad
Legends	−45	45+	women

Qualification
Singles	men	women
- French Open

This article displays the qualifying draw for the Women's Singles at the 2001 French Open.

== Seeds ==
1. (Argentina) María Emilia Salerni (qualified)
2. (Russia) Alina Jidkova (second round)
3. (Belgium) Els Callens (second round)
4. (Slovakia) Martina Suchá (qualified)
5. (Chinese Taipei) Janet Lee (first round)
6. N/A
7. (Japan) Saori Obata (second round)
8. (Germany) Miriam Schnitzer (second round)
9. (Italy) Maria Elena Camerin (first round)
10. (Germany) Gréta Arn (qualified)
11. (Germany) Anca Barna (qualifying competition, lucky loser)
12. (United Kingdom) Louise Latimer (first round)
13. (China) Yi Jingqian (first round)
14. (United States) Holly Parkinson (first round)
15. (Austria) Patricia Wartusch (first round)
16. (Madagascar) Dally Randriantefy (second round)
17. (Hungary) Petra Mandula (qualified)
18. (Socialist Federal Republic of Yugoslavia) Sandra Načuk (qualifying competition)
19. (Hungary) Anikó Kapros (second round)
20. (Belarus) Nadejda Ostrovskaya (first round)
21. (Czech Republic) Alena Vašková (second round)
22. (Slovenia) Katarina Srebotnik (qualified)
23. (Croatia) Maja Palaveršić (second round)
24. (United States) Mashona Washington (first round)

== Qualifiers ==
1. (Argentina) María Emilia Salerni
2. (Slovenia) Katarina Srebotnik
3. (Slovenia) Maja Matevžič
4. (Slovakia) Martina Suchá
5. (Spain) Conchita Martínez Granados
6. (Italy) Adriana Serra Zanetti
7. (Croatia) Mirjana Lučić
8. (Czech Republic) Lenka Nemecková
9. (Spain) Eva Bes-Ostariz
10. (Germany) Gréta Arn
11. (Hungary) Petra Mandula
12. (Hungary) Zsófia Gubacsi

== Lucky losers ==
1. (Germany) Anca Barna
2. (Indonesia) Wynne Prakusya

== Qualifying draw ==
Key

- Q = Qualifier
- WC = Wild card
- LL = Lucky loser
- Alt = Alternate
- ITF = ITF entry
- PR = Protected ranking
- SR = Special ranking
- SE = Special exempt
- JE = Junior exempt
- JR = Junior Accelerator Programme entrant
- CO = College Accelerator Programme entrant
- NG = Next Gen Accelerator Program entrant
- w/o = Walkover
- r = Retired
- d = Defaulted

=== First qualifier ===
First round
1	(Argentina) María Emilia Salerni	6	6
(Slovenia) Petra Rampre	0	1
(Italy) Francesca Lubiani	1	3
(Canada) Maureen Drake	6	6
(Italy) Gloria Pizzichini	6	5	6
(Bulgaria) Antoaneta Pandjerova	2	7	3
(Australia) Christina Wheeler	6	6
15	(Austria) Patricia Wartusch	3	4

Second round
1	(Argentina) María Emilia Salerni	6	6
(Canada) Maureen Drake	3	1
(Italy) Gloria Pizzichini	5	2
(Australia) Christina Wheeler	7	6

Qualifying competition
1	(Argentina) María Emilia Salerni	6	6
(Australia) Christina Wheeler	4	4

=== Second qualifier ===
First round
2	(Russia) Alina Jidkova	5	6	6
(United States) Tracy Almeda-Singian	7	4	3
(Austria) Marion Maruska	6	4	6
WC	(France) Amélie Cocheteux	1	6	1
(France) Sophie Georges	6	6
(Australia) Lisa McShea	0	3
(Argentina) Clarisa Fernández	1	4
22	(Slovenia) Katarina Srebotnik	6	6

Second round
2	(Russia) Alina Jidkova	5	3
(Austria) Marion Maruska	7	6
(France) Sophie Georges	0	0
22	(Slovenia) Katarina Srebotnik	6	6

Qualifying competition
(Austria) Marion Maruska	1	5
22	(Slovenia) Katarina Srebotnik	6	7

=== Third qualifier ===
First round
3	(Belgium) Els Callens	6	6
(South Korea) Kim Eun-ha	3	4
(Kazakhstan) Irina Selyutina	4	2
(Slovenia) Maja Matevžič	6	6
(United States) Tara Snyder	3	1
(Bulgaria) Desislava Topalova	6	6
(Denmark) Eva Dyrberg	6	6
13	(China) Yi Jing-Qian	0	1

Second round
3	(Belgium) Els Callens	5	3
(Slovenia) Maja Matevžič	7	6
(Bulgaria) Desislava Topalova	6	1	6
(Denmark) Eva Dyrberg	3	6	8

Qualifying competition
(Slovenia) Maja Matevžič	6	5	6
(Denmark) Eva Dyrberg	2	7	1

=== Fourth qualifier ===
First round
4	(Slovakia) Martina Suchá	6	7^{7}
(Belgium) Laurence Courtois	1	6^{3}
(Republic of Ireland) Kelly Liggan	3	2
(Czech Republic) Eva Krejčová	6	6
(Canada) Renata Kolbovic	3	1
(Canada) Vanessa Webb	6	6
(Japan) Rika Fujiwara	7^{7}	3	12
20	(Belarus) Nadejda Ostrovskaya	6^{5}	6	10

Second round
4	(Slovakia) Martina Suchá	7	6
(Czech Republic) Eva Krejčová	5	0
(Canada) Vanessa Webb	7	6^{3}	1
(Japan) Rika Fujiwara	5	7^{7}	6

Qualifying competition
4	(Slovakia) Martina Suchá	7^{7}	6
(Japan) Rika Fujiwara	6^{2}	2

=== Fifth qualifier ===
First round
5	(Chinese Taipei) Janet Lee	6	6^{2}	4
(Spain) Conchita Martínez Granados	2	7^{7}	6
(France) Lea Ghirardi	6	6
(Ukraine) Tatiana Perebiynis	4	4
(Australia) Annabel Ellwood	0	7^{8}	5
(United States) Erika deLone	6	6^{6}	7
(Romania) Cătălina Cristea	1	6^{5}
23	(Croatia) Maja Palaveršić	6	7^{7}

Second round
(Spain) Conchita Martínez Granados	6	4	6
(France) Lea Ghirardi	3	6	3
(United States) Erika deLone	6	6
23	(Croatia) Maja Palaveršić	3	3

Qualifying competition
(Spain) Conchita Martínez Granados	6	6
(United States) Erika deLone	4	4

=== Sixth qualifier ===
First round
(Indonesia) Wynne Prakusya	7	7
(Spain) Mariam Ramon Climent	5	5
(South Korea) Cho Yoon-jeong	3	6^{2}
(Germany) Vanessa Henke	6	7^{7}
(Germany) Angelika Rösch	4	2
WC	(France) Stéphanie Cohen-Aloro	6	6
(Italy) Adriana Serra Zanetti	6	6
24	(United States) Mashona Washington	4	2

Second round
(Indonesia) Wynne Prakusya	6	6
(Germany) Vanessa Henke	4	2
WC	(France) Stéphanie Cohen-Aloro	4	4
(Italy) Adriana Serra Zanetti	6	6

Qualifying competition
(Indonesia) Wynne Prakusya	4	4
(Italy) Adriana Serra Zanetti	6	6

=== Seventh qualifier ===
First round
7	(Japan) Saori Obata	6	7
WC	(France) Élodie Le Bescond	3	5
(Czech Republic) Eva Martincová	6	4	0
(Canada) Marie-Ève Pelletier	4	6	6
(Hungary) Katalin Marosi-Aracama	4	1
(Croatia) Mirjana Lučić	6	6
(Czech Republic) Zuzana Ondrášková	3	2
16	(Madagascar) Dally Randriantefy	6	6

Second round
7	(Japan) Saori Obata	1	1
(Canada) Marie-Ève Pelletier	6	6
(Croatia) Mirjana Lučić	6	2	6
16	(Madagascar) Dally Randriantefy	2	6	1

Qualifying competition
(Canada) Marie-Ève Pelletier	3	6^{4}
(Croatia) Mirjana Lučić	6	7^{7}

=== Eighth qualifier ===
First round
8	(Germany) Miriam Schnitzer	6	6
(Japan) Yuka Yoshida	4	1
(Hungary) Kira Nagy	6	6
(Germany) Angelika Bachmann	3	4
(Czech Republic) Lenka Nemecková	6	6
(Spain) Ainhoa Goñi	4	2
(India) Nirupama Vaidyanathan	6	6
14	(United States) Holly Parkinson	4	3

Second round
8	(Germany) Miriam Schnitzer	4	6	2
(Hungary) Kira Nagy	6	4	6
(Czech Republic) Lenka Nemecková	6	6
(India) Nirupama Vaidyanathan	0	3

Qualifying competition
(Hungary) Kira Nagy	2	7^{12}	3
(Czech Republic) Lenka Nemecková	6	6^{10}	6

=== Ninth qualifier ===
First round
9	(Italy) Maria Elena Camerin	0	0
(Spain) Eva Bes-Ostariz	6	6
WC	(France) Anne-Laure Heitz	3	2
(Italy) Nathalie Viérin	6	6
(Greece) Eleni Daniilidou	6	6
(Morocco) Bahia Mouhtassine	2	3
(Austria) Evelyn Fauth	2	3
21	(Czech Republic) Alena Vašková	6	6

Second round
(Spain) Eva Bes-Ostariz	7^{9}	6
(Italy) Nathalie Viérin	6^{7}	1
(Greece) Eleni Daniilidou	1	6	6
21	(Czech Republic) Alena Vašková	6	2	2

Qualifying competition
(Spain) Eva Bes-Ostariz	6	1	7
(Greece) Eleni Daniilidou	2	6	5

=== Tenth qualifier ===
First round
10	(Germany) Gréta Arn	7^{7}	6
WC	(France) Ségolène Berger	6^{4}	3
(Netherlands) Seda Noorlander	7^{7}	6^{5}	6
(Ukraine) Tatiana Kovalchuk	6^{4}	7^{7}	3
WC	(France) Sophie Erre	3	2
(Czech Republic) Klára Koukalová	6	6
WC	(France) Stéphanie Rizzi	2	2
18	(Socialist Federal Republic of Yugoslavia) Sandra Načuk	6	6

Second round
10	(Germany) Gréta Arn	7^{7}	6
(Netherlands) Seda Noorlander	6^{2}	2
(Czech Republic) Klára Koukalová	3	1
18	(Socialist Federal Republic of Yugoslavia) Sandra Načuk	6	6

Qualifying competition
10	(Germany) Gréta Arn	6^{4}	6	6
18	(Socialist Federal Republic of Yugoslavia) Sandra Načuk	7^{7}	4	2

=== Eleventh qualifier ===
First round
11	(Germany) Anca Barna	6	6
(Hungary) Anna Földényi	0	0
(Czech Republic) Michaela Paštiková	6	7^{7}
(Italy) Germana Di Natale	2	6^{2}
(Germany) Mia Buric	1	2
(United States) Samantha Reeves	6	6
(United Kingdom) Lucie Ahl	0	4
17	(Hungary) Petra Mandula	6	6

Second round
11	(Germany) Anca Barna	6	4	6
(Czech Republic) Michaela Paštiková	2	6	4
(United States) Samantha Reeves	2	4
17	(Hungary) Petra Mandula	6	6

Qualifying competition
11	(Germany) Anca Barna	2	2
17	(Hungary) Petra Mandula	6	6

=== Twelfth qualifier ===
First round
12	(United Kingdom) Louise Latimer	4	3
(Ukraine) Elena Tatarkova	6	6
(United Kingdom) Julie Pullin	3	1
(Socialist Federal Republic of Yugoslavia) Dragana Zarić	6	6
(Hungary) Zsófia Gubacsi	6	6
(Italy) Antonella Serra Zanetti	3	4
(Spain) Gisela Riera	1	4
19	(Hungary) Anikó Kapros	6	6

Second round
(Ukraine) Elena Tatarkova	5	4
(Socialist Federal Republic of Yugoslavia) Dragana Zarić	7	6
(Hungary) Zsófia Gubacsi	6	3	6
19	(Hungary) Anikó Kapros	2	6	4

Qualifying competition
(Socialist Federal Republic of Yugoslavia) Dragana Zarić	5	2
(Hungary) Zsófia Gubacsi	7	6
