= 2002 French Open – Women's singles qualifying =

Women's singles qualifying
- 2002 French Open

Events
Singles	men	women		boys	girls
Doubles	men	women	mixed	boys	girls
WC Singles	men	women	quad
WC Doubles	men	women	quad
Legends	−45	45+	women

Qualification
Singles	men	women
- French Open

This article displays the qualifying draw for the Women's Singles at the 2002 French Open.

== Seeds ==
1. (Canada) Maureen Drake (second round)
2. (Germany) Angelika Rösch (qualifying competition)
3. (Ukraine) Julia Vakulenko (second round)
4. (United States) Mashona Washington (first round)
5. (Japan) Shinobu Asagoe (qualified)
6. (Czech Republic) Alena Vašková (qualifying competition)
7. (Venezuela) Milagros Sequera (qualified)
8. (Belgium) Els Callens (qualifying competition)
9. (Japan) Rika Fujiwara (qualifying competition)
10. (Italy) Antonella Serra Zanetti (qualifying competition)
11. (Argentina) María Emilia Salerni (second round)
12. (Bulgaria) Lubomira Bacheva (qualified)
13. (Canada) Vanessa Webb (first round)
14. (Austria) Evelyn Fauth (second round)
15. (Czech Republic) Sandra Kleinová (qualifying competition)
16. (Netherlands) Kristie Boogert (second round)
17. (Russia) Evgenia Kulikovskaya (qualifying competition)
18. (Russia) Svetlana Kuznetsova (second round)
19. (United States) Erika deLone (withdrew)
20. (Ukraine) Tatiana Perebiynis (first round)
21. (Slovakia) Ľubomíra Kurhajcová (first round)
22. (Australia) Rachel McQuillan (first round)
23. (Canada) Marie-Ève Pelletier (first round)
24. (Austria) Patricia Wartusch (first round)

== Qualifiers ==
1. (Madagascar) Dally Randriantefy
2. (Hungary) Rita Kuti-Kis
3. (Hungary) Anikó Kapros
4. (Russia) Vera Zvonareva
5. (Japan) Shinobu Asagoe
6. (Russia) Maria Goloviznina
7. (Venezuela) Milagros Sequera
8. (Spain) Conchita Martínez Granados
9. (Croatia) Mirjana Lučić
10. (Spain) Nuria Llagostera Vives
11. (Czech Republic) Iveta Benešová
12. (Bulgaria) Lubomira Bacheva

== Qualifying draw ==
Key

- Q = Qualifier
- WC = Wild card
- LL = Lucky loser
- Alt = Alternate
- ITF = ITF entry
- PR = Protected ranking
- SR = Special ranking
- SE = Special exempt
- JE = Junior exempt
- JR = Junior Accelerator Programme entrant
- CO = College Accelerator Programme entrant
- NG = Next Gen Accelerator Program entrant
- w/o = Walkover
- r = Retired
- d = Defaulted

=== First qualifier ===
First round
1	(Canada) Maureen Drake	6	6
(Australia) Amanda Grahame	4	4
(Romania) Andreea Vanc	6	5	7
WC	(France) Elsa Morel	1	7	5
(Madagascar) Dally Randriantefy	6	6
(Australia) Mireille Dittmann	3	1
(Czech Republic) Olga Blahotová	2	4
14	(Austria) Evelyn Fauth	6	6

Second round
1	(Canada) Maureen Drake	6	3	5
(Romania) Andreea Vanc	2	6	7
(Madagascar) Dally Randriantefy	3	6	6
14	(Austria) Evelyn Fauth	6	1	1

Qualifying competition
(Romania) Andreea Vanc	4	4
(Madagascar) Dally Randriantefy	6	6

=== Second qualifier ===
First round
2	(Germany) Angelika Rösch	6	6
(Colombia) Catalina Castaño	3	1
(Russia) Galina Fokina	6	2	6
(Germany) Andrea Glass	3	6	4
WC	(France) Tatiana Golovin	6	3
(South Korea) Kim Eun-ha	2	0^{r}
(Hungary) Rita Kuti-Kis	6	7^{7}
20	(Ukraine) Tatiana Perebiynis	3	6^{2}

Second round
2	(Germany) Angelika Rösch	6	3	6
(Russia) Galina Fokina	4	6	3
WC	(France) Tatiana Golovin	4	2
(Hungary) Rita Kuti-Kis	6	6

Qualifying competition
2	(Germany) Angelika Rösch	3	1
(Hungary) Rita Kuti-Kis	6	6

=== Third qualifier ===
First round
3	(Ukraine) Julia Vakulenko	6	6
(Russia) Anastasia Rodionova	1	3
(Chinese Taipei) Hsieh Su-wei	6	6
WC	(France) Séverine Beltrame	4	3
WC	(France) Sophie Erre	2	1
(Hungary) Anikó Kapros	6	6
(Germany) Sabine Klaschka	6	6
13	(Canada) Vanessa Webb	0	4

Second round
3	(Ukraine) Julia Vakulenko	6	4	2
(Chinese Taipei) Hsieh Su-wei	3	6	6
(Hungary) Anikó Kapros	6	6
(Germany) Sabine Klaschka	0	3

Qualifying competition
(Chinese Taipei) Hsieh Su-wei	6	1	4
(Hungary) Anikó Kapros	3	6	6

=== Fourth qualifier ===
First round
4	(United States) Mashona Washington	3	4
(Germany) Nina Dübbers	6	6
WC	(France) Élodie Le Bescond	5	2
(Germany) Angelika Bachmann	7	6
(Italy) Valentina Sassi	6	4	2
(Russia) Vera Zvonareva	3	6	6
(United States) Tara Snyder	6	3	6
16	(Netherlands) Kristie Boogert	2	6	8

Second round
(Germany) Nina Dübbers	5	6	1
(Germany) Angelika Bachmann	7	1	6
(Russia) Vera Zvonareva	7^{7}	6
16	(Netherlands) Kristie Boogert	6^{1}	2

Qualifying competition
(Germany) Angelika Bachmann	3	3
(Russia) Vera Zvonareva	6	6

=== Fifth qualifier ===
First round
5	(Japan) Shinobu Asagoe	1	7	6
(Luxembourg) Claudine Schaul	6	5	2
(Czech Republic) Klára Koukalová	6^{9}	3
(South Africa) Liezel Huber	7^{11}	6
(Bulgaria) Svetlana Krivencheva	2	6	6
WC	(France) Stéphanie Rizzi	6	4	3
(Japan) Miho Saeki	6^{3}	2
15	(Czech Republic) Sandra Kleinová	7^{7}	6

Second round
5	(Japan) Shinobu Asagoe	7^{8}	6
(South Africa) Liezel Huber	6^{6}	3
(Bulgaria) Svetlana Krivencheva	1	1
15	(Czech Republic) Sandra Kleinová	6	6

Qualifying competition
5	(Japan) Shinobu Asagoe	3	6	6
15	(Czech Republic) Sandra Kleinová	6	4	1

=== Sixth qualifier ===
First round
6	(Czech Republic) Alena Vašková	6	6
WC	(France) Olivia Sanchez	4	4
(Spain) Ainhoa Goñi	4	6^{2}
(Italy) Roberta Vinci	6	7^{7}
(Russia) Maria Goloviznina	4	6	6
(Slovakia) Lenka Dlhopolcová	6	2	2
(Bulgaria) Desislava Topalova	6	3	7
21	(Slovakia) Ľubomíra Kurhajcová	4	6	5

Second round
6	(Czech Republic) Alena Vašková	7	5	7
(Italy) Roberta Vinci	5	7	5
(Russia) Maria Goloviznina	6	6
(Bulgaria) Desislava Topalova	3	3

Qualifying competition
6	(Czech Republic) Alena Vašková	3	3
(Russia) Maria Goloviznina	6	6

=== Seventh qualifier ===
First round
7	(Venezuela) Milagros Sequera	7	6
(Czech Republic) Michaela Paštiková	5	4
(Australia) Bryanne Stewart	3	1
(Japan) Akiko Morigami	6	6
(Czech Republic) Libuše Prušová	6	6
(Germany) Adriana Barna	1	1
WC	(France) Amandine Dulon	6	6
23	(Canada) Marie-Ève Pelletier	3	4

Second round
7	(Venezuela) Milagros Sequera	6	7
(Japan) Akiko Morigami	3	5
(Czech Republic) Libuše Prušová	6	6
WC	(France) Amandine Dulon	2	2

Qualifying competition
7	(Venezuela) Milagros Sequera	6	7^{10}
(Czech Republic) Libuše Prušová	3	6^{8}

=== Eighth qualifier ===
First round
8	(Belgium) Els Callens	6	5	6
(Slovakia) Eva Fislová	4	7	3
(Argentina) Gisela Dulko	6	6
(Czech Republic) Renata Voráčová	1	2
(Spain) Conchita Martínez Granados	6	6
(United States) Jane Chi	1	2
(Spain) María Sánchez Lorenzo	6	6
24	(Austria) Patricia Wartusch	3	2

Second round
8	(Belgium) Els Callens	4	7^{7}	11
(Argentina) Gisela Dulko	6	6^{5}	9
(Spain) Conchita Martínez Granados	6	3	6
(Spain) María Sánchez Lorenzo	2	6	2

Qualifying competition
8	(Belgium) Els Callens	4	2
(Spain) Conchita Martínez Granados	6	6

=== Ninth qualifier ===
First round
9	(Japan) Rika Fujiwara	6^{5}	6	6
(Estonia) Maret Ani	7^{7}	1	2
(Spain) María José Martínez Sánchez	3	2
(Czech Republic) Lenka Nemecková	6	6
(Austria) Sylvia Plischke	5	6	5
(Croatia) Mirjana Lučić	7	3	7
(Australia) Cindy Watson	7^{7}	2	7
22	(Australia) Rachel McQuillan	6^{4}	6	5

Second round
9	(Japan) Rika Fujiwara	6	6
(Czech Republic) Lenka Nemecková	3	3
(Croatia) Mirjana Lučić	6	6
(Australia) Cindy Watson	4	2

Qualifying competition
9	(Japan) Rika Fujiwara	6	4	2
(Croatia) Mirjana Lučić	1	6	6

=== Tenth qualifier ===
First round
10	(Italy) Antonella Serra Zanetti	6	6
(Czech Republic) Eva Krejčová	1	2
(Morocco) Bahia Mouhtassine	4	6	6
(Italy) Nathalie Viérin	6	2	2
(Hungary) Kira Nagy	7^{7}	6
(United States) Ansley Cargill	6^{3}	2
(Spain) Nuria Llagostera Vives	6	3	6
Alt	(Czech Republic) Magdalena Zděnovcová	3	6	3

Second round
10	(Italy) Antonella Serra Zanetti	6	6
(Morocco) Bahia Mouhtassine	4	4
(Hungary) Kira Nagy	6	4	4
(Spain) Nuria Llagostera Vives	1	6	6

Qualifying competition
10	(Italy) Antonella Serra Zanetti	6	1	5
(Spain) Nuria Llagostera Vives	4	6	7

=== Eleventh qualifier ===
First round
11	(Argentina) María Emilia Salerni	6^{4}	6	7
(United States) Laura Granville	7^{7}	1	5
(Netherlands) Amanda Hopmans	1	5
(Czech Republic) Iveta Benešová	6	7
(Belgium) Daphne van de Zande	1	3
(Spain) Lourdes Domínguez Lino	6	6
(United Kingdom) Lucie Ahl	1	3
18	(Russia) Svetlana Kuznetsova	6	6

Second round
11	(Argentina) María Emilia Salerni	7^{8}	2	3
(Czech Republic) Iveta Benešová	6^{6}	6	6
(Spain) Lourdes Domínguez Lino	6	3	6
18	(Russia) Svetlana Kuznetsova	4	6	3

Qualifying competition
(Czech Republic) Iveta Benešová	5	6	6
(Spain) Lourdes Domínguez Lino	7	4	3

=== Twelfth qualifier ===
First round
12	(Bulgaria) Lubomira Bacheva	6	6
(United Kingdom) Julie Pullin	2	2
(Ukraine) Elena Tatarkova	6	4	3
(Italy) Gloria Pizzichini	4	6	6
(France) Anne-Laure Heitz	3	0
(Slovakia) Stanislava Hrozenská	6	6
(Venezuela) María Vento-Kabchi	3	6	1
17	(Russia) Evgenia Kulikovskaya	6	0	6

Second round
12	(Bulgaria) Lubomira Bacheva	6	6
(Italy) Gloria Pizzichini	2	3
(Slovakia) Stanislava Hrozenská	1	3
17	(Russia) Evgenia Kulikovskaya	6	6

Qualifying competition
12	(Bulgaria) Lubomira Bacheva	6	6^{3}	6
17	(Russia) Evgenia Kulikovskaya	3	7^{7}	4
