= 2002 US Open – Women's singles qualifying =

Women's singles qualifying
- 2002 US Open

Events
Singles	men	women		boys	girls
Doubles	men	women	mixed	boys	girls
WC Singles	men	women	quad
WC Doubles	men	women	quad
Legends	men	women	mixed

Qualification
Singles	men	women
- US Open

This article displays the qualifying draw for the Women's Singles at the 2002 US Open.

== Seeds ==
1. (Czech Republic) Denisa Chládková (qualified)
2. (Colombia) Fabiola Zuluaga (qualified)
3. (Russia) Svetlana Kuznetsova (qualified)
4. (Russia) Evgenia Kulikovskaya (second round)
5. (South Korea) Cho Yoon-jeong (qualified)
6. (Canada) Maureen Drake (second round)
7. (Ukraine) Tatiana Perebiynis (second round)
8. (Czech Republic) Iveta Benešová (qualified)
9. (Canada) Jana Nejedly (first round)
10. (Bulgaria) Lubomira Bacheva (first round)
11. (Venezuela) Milagros Sequera (first round)
12. (Kazakhstan) Irina Selyutina (first round)
13. (Czech Republic) Sandra Kleinová (first round)
14. (Italy) Antonella Serra Zanetti (qualified)
15. (Hungary) Anikó Kapros (qualifying competition)
16. (Australia) Evie Dominikovic (first round)
17. (Czech Republic) Zuzana Ondrášková (qualifying competition)
18. (France) Céline Beigbeder (first round)
19. (Italy) Flavia Pennetta (first round)
20. (Slovakia) Ľubomíra Kurhajcová (first round)
21. (Spain) Eva Bes-Ostariz (qualifying competition)
22. (Spain) María Sánchez Lorenzo (qualifying competition)
23. (Czech Republic) Alena Vašková (second round)
24. (Czech Republic) Libuše Prušová (qualifying competition)
25. (Madagascar) Dally Randriantefy (qualifying competition)
26. (Czech Republic) Klára Koukalová (first round)
27. (Chinese Taipei) Hsieh Su-wei (first round)
28. (Austria) Evelyn Fauth (second round)
29. (Australia) Cindy Watson (first round)
30. (Chinese Taipei) Janet Lee (first round)
31. (South Africa) Liezel Horn (withdrew)
32. (Japan) Akiko Morigami (first round)

== Qualifiers ==
1. (Czech Republic) Denisa Chládková
2. (Colombia) Fabiola Zuluaga
3. (Russia) Svetlana Kuznetsova
4. (United States) Bethanie Mattek
5. (South Korea) Cho Yoon-jeong
6. (Argentina) María Emilia Salerni
7. (Bulgaria) Maria Geznenge
8. (Czech Republic) Iveta Benešová
9. (United States) Brie Rippner
10. (Czech Republic) Renata Voráčová
11. (United States) Ansley Cargill
12. (South Korea) Jeon Mi-ra
13. (France) Marion Bartoli
14. (Italy) Antonella Serra Zanetti
15. (Croatia) Mirjana Lučić
16. (Estonia) Maret Ani

== Qualifying draw ==
Key

- Q = Qualifier
- WC = Wild card
- LL = Lucky loser
- Alt = Alternate
- ITF = ITF entry
- PR = Protected ranking
- SR = Special ranking
- SE = Special exempt
- JE = Junior exempt
- JR = Junior Accelerator Programme entrant
- CO = College Accelerator Programme entrant
- NG = Next Gen Accelerator Program entrant
- w/o = Walkover
- r = Retired
- d = Defaulted

=== First qualifier ===
First round
1	(Czech Republic) Denisa Chládková	6	6
(Germany) Adriana Barna	1	1
(Venezuela) María Vento-Kabchi	6	6
(Belarus) Nadejda Ostrovskaya	4	1
(Germany) Jana Kandarr	6	6
(United Kingdom) Elena Baltacha	4	3
(Australia) Bryanne Stewart	3	3
28	(Austria) Evelyn Fauth	6	6

Second round
1	(Czech Republic) Denisa Chládková	0	6	6
(Venezuela) María Vento-Kabchi	6	2	0
(Germany) Jana Kandarr	6	6
28	(Austria) Evelyn Fauth	4	3

Qualifying competition
1	(Czech Republic) Denisa Chládková	6	6
(Germany) Jana Kandarr	1	4

=== Second qualifier ===
First round
2	(Colombia) Fabiola Zuluaga	6	6
(France) Laurence Andretto	3	3
(Republic of Ireland) Kelly Liggan	6	4	3
(Tunisia) Selima Sfar	1	6	6
WC	(United States) Kristen Schlukebir	5	4
(Morocco) Bahia Mouhtassine	7	6
(Italy) Gloria Pizzichini	2	3
21	(Spain) Eva Bes-Ostariz	6	6

Second round
2	(Colombia) Fabiola Zuluaga	6	6
(Tunisia) Selima Sfar	0	1
(Morocco) Bahia Mouhtassine	2	2
21	(Spain) Eva Bes-Ostariz	6	6

Qualifying competition
2	(Colombia) Fabiola Zuluaga	6	6
21	(Spain) Eva Bes-Ostariz	1	0

=== Third qualifier ===
First round
3	(Russia) Svetlana Kuznetsova	6	7^{7}
(Netherlands) Seda Noorlander	4	6^{4}
(Italy) Valentina Sassi	6	6
(Italy) Francesca Lubiani	2	4
(United Kingdom) Julie Pullin	1	2
(Italy) Nathalie Viérin	6	6
(Czech Republic) Magdalena Zděnovcová	0	2
25	(Madagascar) Dally Randriantefy	6	6

Second round
3	(Russia) Svetlana Kuznetsova	6	6
(Italy) Valentina Sassi	3	1
(Italy) Nathalie Viérin	4	3
25	(Madagascar) Dally Randriantefy	6	6

Qualifying competition
3	(Russia) Svetlana Kuznetsova	6	3	7^{7}
25	(Madagascar) Dally Randriantefy	3	6	6^{4}

=== Fourth qualifier ===
First round
4	(Russia) Evgenia Kulikovskaya	6	3	6
(Russia) Galina Fokina	1	6	3
(Czech Republic) Michaela Paštiková	3	6	4
WC	(United States) Bethanie Mattek	6	4	6
(Germany) Sandra Klösel	6^{5}	2
(Netherlands) Amanda Hopmans	7^{7}	6
(Spain) Ainhoa Goñi	5	3
17	(Czech Republic) Zuzana Ondrášková	7	6

Second round
4	(Russia) Evgenia Kulikovskaya	4	2
WC	(United States) Bethanie Mattek	6	6
(Netherlands) Amanda Hopmans	2	6	3
17	(Czech Republic) Zuzana Ondrášková	6	2	6

Qualifying competition
WC	(United States) Bethanie Mattek	6	6
17	(Czech Republic) Zuzana Ondrášková	3	4

=== Fifth qualifier ===
First round
5	(South Korea) Cho Yoon-jeong	6	6
(Russia) Ekaterina Sysoeva	1	3
(Bulgaria) Svetlana Krivencheva	2	4
(Czech Republic) Olga Blahotová	6	6
(Federal Republic of Yugoslavia) Jelena Janković	6	3	6^{5}
(United States) Kristina Brandi	3	6	7^{7}
WC	(United States) Gabriela Lastra	1	6	4
22	(Spain) María Sánchez Lorenzo	6	3	6

Second round
5	(South Korea) Cho Yoon-jeong	6	6
(Czech Republic) Olga Blahotová	0	2
(United States) Kristina Brandi	2	7	6^{2}
22	(Spain) María Sánchez Lorenzo	6	5	7^{7}

Qualifying competition
5	(South Korea) Cho Yoon-jeong	6	6
22	(Spain) María Sánchez Lorenzo	3	1

=== Sixth qualifier ===
First round
6	(Canada) Maureen Drake	4	6	6
(Canada) Sonya Jeyaseelan	6	1	1
(Argentina) María Emilia Salerni	6	6
(Czech Republic) Eva Krejčová	2	2
(Germany) Nina Dübbers	7^{7}	7
(Italy) Maria Elena Camerin	6^{5}	5
WC	(United States) Sunitha Rao	6	6
32	(Japan) Akiko Morigami	3	2

Second round
6	(Canada) Maureen Drake	6	2	4
(Argentina) María Emilia Salerni	4	6	6
(Germany) Nina Dübbers	6	6
WC	(United States) Sunitha Rao	2	4

Qualifying competition
(Argentina) María Emilia Salerni	6^{2}	6	6
(Germany) Nina Dübbers	7^{7}	4	4

=== Seventh qualifier ===
First round
7	(Ukraine) Tatiana Perebiynis	6	6
(Germany) Vanessa Henke	3	4
(Netherlands) Kristie Boogert	6	6
(Ukraine) Anna Zaporozhanova	3	1
(United Kingdom) Lucie Ahl	6	6
WC	(United States) Tanner Cochran	1	3
(Bulgaria) Maria Geznenge	6	7
27	(Chinese Taipei) Hsieh Su-wei	1	5

Second round
7	(Ukraine) Tatiana Perebiynis	2	5
(Netherlands) Kristie Boogert	6	7
(United Kingdom) Lucie Ahl	6	4	4
(Bulgaria) Maria Geznenge	4	6	6

Qualifying competition
(Netherlands) Kristie Boogert	6	3	4
(Bulgaria) Maria Geznenge	3	6	6

=== Eighth qualifier ===
First round
8	(Czech Republic) Iveta Benešová	6	6
(Hungary) Kira Nagy	1	2
(United States) Erika deLone	0	6	6
(Luxembourg) Claudine Schaul	6	3	1
(France) Alexandra Fusai	6^{2}	6	5
(Japan) Miho Saeki	7^{7}	3	7
(Romania) Andreea Vanc	6	6
30	(Chinese Taipei) Janet Lee	4	2

Second round
8	(Czech Republic) Iveta Benešová	6	6
(United States) Erika deLone	3	3
(Japan) Miho Saeki	7	6
(Romania) Andreea Vanc	5	3

Qualifying competition
8	(Czech Republic) Iveta Benešová	3	7	6
(Japan) Miho Saeki	6	5	4

=== Ninth qualifier ===
First round
9	(Canada) Jana Nejedly	7	1	6^{1}
(Slovakia) Eva Fislová	5	6	7^{7}
(Spain) Arantxa Parra Santonja	5	2
(Sweden) Sofia Arvidsson	7	6
(Russia) Maria Goloviznina	6^{3}	3
(Hungary) Katalin Marosi	7^{7}	6
(Slovakia) Stanislava Hrozenská	6^{4}	2
Alt	(United States) Brie Rippner	7^{7}	6

Second round
(Slovakia) Eva Fislová	3	4
(Sweden) Sofia Arvidsson	6	6
(Hungary) Katalin Marosi	2	4
Alt	(United States) Brie Rippner	6	6

Qualifying competition
(Sweden) Sofia Arvidsson	7	4	0
Alt	(United States) Brie Rippner	5	6	6

=== Tenth qualifier ===
First round
10	(Bulgaria) Lubomira Bacheva	3	1
(Ukraine) Yuliana Fedak	6	6
(United States) Jane Chi	3	6	1
(Czech Republic) Renata Voráčová	6	4	6
(United States) Lindsay Lee-Waters	6	6
(Czech Republic) Lenka Nemecková	3	3
(Estonia) Kaia Kanepi	6	4	6^{4}
23	(Czech Republic) Alena Vašková	2	6	7^{7}

Second round
(Ukraine) Yuliana Fedak	2	0
(Czech Republic) Renata Voráčová	6	6
(United States) Lindsay Lee-Waters	1
23	(Czech Republic) Alena Vašková	2^{r}

Qualifying competition
(Czech Republic) Renata Voráčová	2	7^{8}	6
(United States) Lindsay Lee-Waters	6	6^{6}	4

=== Eleventh qualifier ===
First round
11	(Venezuela) Milagros Sequera	7^{7}	1	2
(Czech Republic) Eva Birnerová	6^{2}	6	6
(Australia) Mireille Dittmann	1	4
(Russia) Anastasia Rodionova	6	6
(Germany) Angelika Bachmann	7^{7}	2	2
(United States) Ansley Cargill	6^{5}	6	6
WC	(United States) Cory Ann Avants	6	6
29	(Australia) Cindy Watson	3	4

Second round
(Czech Republic) Eva Birnerová	6^{5}	3
(Russia) Anastasia Rodionova	7^{7}	6
(United States) Ansley Cargill	6	6
WC	(United States) Cory Ann Avants	4	4

Qualifying competition
(Russia) Anastasia Rodionova	6	4	6^{4}
(United States) Ansley Cargill	3	6	7^{7}

=== Twelfth qualifier ===
First round
12	(Kazakhstan) Irina Selyutina	6	3	3
(Slovakia) Zuzana Kucová	4	6	6
(China) Zheng Jie	2	6	7^{7}
(Canada) Vanessa Webb	6	3	6^{5}
(South Korea) Jeon Mi-ra	1	6	6
(Bulgaria) Desislava Topalova	6	0	4
(Germany) Sabine Klaschka	6	0	7
20	(Slovakia) Ľubomíra Kurhajcová	4	6	5

Second round
(Slovakia) Zuzana Kucová	6	6
(China) Zheng Jie	4	2
(South Korea) Jeon Mi-ra	7	6
(Germany) Sabine Klaschka	5	1

Qualifying competition
(Slovakia) Zuzana Kucová	2	1
(South Korea) Jeon Mi-ra	6	6

=== Thirteenth qualifier ===
First round
13	(Czech Republic) Sandra Kleinová	6	3	2
(France) Marion Bartoli	4	6	6
(United States) Teryn Ashley	2	6	0
(France) Camille Pin	6	1	6
(India) Nirupama Vaidyanathan	0	4
(Canada) Marie-Ève Pelletier	6	6
(Japan) Rika Fujiwara	7^{9}	6
19	(Italy) Flavia Pennetta	6^{7}	1

Second round
(France) Marion Bartoli	6	6
(France) Camille Pin	1	2
(Canada) Marie-Ève Pelletier	2	7	6
(Japan) Rika Fujiwara	6	5	1

Qualifying competition
(France) Marion Bartoli	7^{7}	6
(Canada) Marie-Ève Pelletier	6^{5}	1

=== Fourteenth qualifier ===
First round
14	(Italy) Antonella Serra Zanetti	6	6
(Australia) Rachel McQuillan	4	2
(Australia) Christina Wheeler	7	6
(Italy) Roberta Vinci	5	4
(United States) Allison Bradshaw	6	7
WC	(United States) Kelly McCain	2	5
(Ukraine) Elena Tatarkova	4	6^{4}
24	(Czech Republic) Libuše Prušová	6	7^{7}

Second round
14	(Italy) Antonella Serra Zanetti	6	6
(Australia) Christina Wheeler	1	0
(United States) Allison Bradshaw	1	6	0^{r}
24	(Czech Republic) Libuše Prušová	6	3	2

Qualifying competition
14	(Italy) Antonella Serra Zanetti	6^{4}	6	6
24	(Czech Republic) Libuše Prušová	7^{7}	3	2

=== Fifteenth qualifier ===
First round
15	(Hungary) Anikó Kapros	7	7
(United States) Tara Snyder	5	5
(Spain) Nuria Llagostera Vives	3	4
(France) Anne-Laure Heitz	6	6
(Australia) Amanda Grahame	6^{4}	2
(Ukraine) Yuliya Beygelzimer	7^{7}	6
(Croatia) Mirjana Lučić	6	7
26	(Czech Republic) Klára Koukalová	4	5

Second round
15	(Hungary) Anikó Kapros	3	6	6
(France) Anne-Laure Heitz	6	1	1
(Ukraine) Yuliya Beygelzimer	2	3
(Croatia) Mirjana Lučić	6	6

Qualifying competition
15	(Hungary) Anikó Kapros	6	1	1
(Croatia) Mirjana Lučić	3	6	6

=== Sixteenth qualifier ===
First round
16	(Australia) Evie Dominikovic	3	4
(Argentina) Gisela Dulko	6	6
WC	(United States) Jessica Lehnhoff	6	6
(Colombia) Catalina Castaño	1	1
(Hungary) Melinda Czink	2	4
(Estonia) Maret Ani	6	6
WC	(United States) Shenay Perry	6	6
18	(France) Céline Beigbeder	3	1

Second round
(Argentina) Gisela Dulko	4	6	0
WC	(United States) Jessica Lehnhoff	6	0	6
(Estonia) Maret Ani	5	6	6
WC	(United States) Shenay Perry	7	2	2

Qualifying competition
WC	(United States) Jessica Lehnhoff	4	3
(Estonia) Maret Ani	6	6
