= Open International de Saint-Raphaël =

Defunct tennis tournament
- Event name: Saint-Raphaël
- Location: Saint-Raphaël, France
- Venue: Saint-Raphaël Country Club
- Category: ITF Women's Circuit
- Surface: Hard (indoor)
- Draw: 32S/32Q/16D
- Prize money: $50,000
- Website: Official Website

The Open International de Saint-Raphaël was a tournament for professional female tennis players. The event was classified as a $50,000+H ITF Women's Circuit tournament and was held in Saint-Raphaël, France, on indoor hardcourts from 1991 to 2010.

== Past finals ==
=== Singles ===
Year	Champion	Runner-up	Score
2010	(United States) Alison Riske	(Poland) Urszula Radwańska	6–4, 6–2
2009	(France) Pauline Parmentier	(Czech Republic) Sandra Záhlavová	7–6^{(7–4)}, 6–2
2008	(Germany) Angelique Kerber	(France) Séverine Brémond	6–2, 6–1
2007	(Italy) Alberta Brianti	(France) Stéphanie Foretz	6–4, 6–4
2006	(France) Stéphanie Foretz	(France) Youlia Fedossova	7–6^{(7–5)}, 6–7^{(4–7)}, 6–1
2005	(Estonia) Maret Ani	(Italy) Mara Santangelo	6–3, 7–5
2004	(Czech Republic) Barbora Strýcová	(France) Stéphanie Cohen-Aloro	6–1, 6–2
2003	(France) Camille Pin	(Estonia) Maret Ani	6–2, 6–2
2002	(France) Camille Pin	(France) Séverine Beltrame	6–4, 7–5
2001	(Italy) Nathalie Viérin	(France) Anne-Laure Heitz	4–6, 6–1, 6–3
2000	(Germany) Mia Buric	(Estonia) Maret Ani	4–2, 1–4, 2–4, 5–3, 5–3
1999	(France) Olivia Sanchez	(Germany) Magdalena Kučerová	6–1, 1–6, 7–5
1998	(Poland) Katarzyna Nowak	(Germany) Magdalena Kučerová	6–1, 7–6
1997	(France) Sophie Erre	(Netherlands) Yvette Basting	6–4, 6–1
1996	(Germany) Susi Lohrmann	(France) Émilie Loit	5–7, 6–2, 6–0
1995–91	—N/a		

=== Doubles ===
Year	Champions	Runners-up	Score
2010	(Austria) Sandra Klemenschits (Germany) Tatjana Malek	(Spain) Estrella Cabeza Candela (Spain) Laura Pous Tió	6–2, 6–4
2009	(France) Claire Feuerstein (France) Stéphanie Foretz	(Georgia (country)) Margalita Chakhnashvili (Spain) Sílvia Soler Espinosa	7–6^{(7–4)}, 7–5
2008	(Czech Republic) Eva Birnerová (Czech Republic) Lucie Hradecká	(France) Gracia Radovanovic (Czech Republic) Renata Voráčová	6–4, 6–3
2007	(Russia) Ekaterina Makarova (United States) Lilia Osterloh	(Georgia (country)) Margalita Chakhnashvili (Belarus) Ksenia Milevskaya	6–2, 6–2
2006	(Ukraine) Mariya Koryttseva (Russia) Galina Voskoboeva	(France) Alizé Cornet (France) Youlia Fedossova	6–2, 6–4
2005	(Czech Republic) Lucie Hradecká (Czech Republic) Sandra Záhlavová	(Argentina) María Emilia Salerni (United States) Meilen Tu	4–6, 6–4, 7–5
2004	(France) Stéphanie Cohen-Aloro (Tunisia) Selima Sfar	(Czech Republic) Barbora Strýcová (Russia) Galina Voskoboeva	7–6^{(7–3)}, 2–6, 6–4
2003	(Bosnia and Herzegovina) Mervana Jugić-Salkić (Croatia) Darija Jurak	(Estonia) Maret Ani (France) Camille Pin	6–2, 6–1
2002	(Bulgaria) Antoaneta Pandjerova (Bulgaria) Desislava Topalova	(Federal Republic of Yugoslavia) Katarina Mišić (Federal Republic of Yugoslavia) Dragana Zarić	4–6, 6–3, 6–1
2001	(France) Caroline Dhenin (New Zealand) Shelley Stephens	(France) Anne-Laure Heitz (France) Élodie Le Bescond	6–0, 7–5
2000	(Spain) Ainhoa Goñi Blanco (Spain) Nuria Llagostera Vives	(France) Kildine Chevalier (Netherlands) Susanne Trik	4–1, 5–4^{(7–5)}, 3–1 ret.
1999	(Slovenia) Maja Matevžič (Italy) Valentina Sassi	(France) Victoria Courmes-Benedetti (France) Laëtitia Sanchez	6–3, 6–1
1998	(Germany) Vanessa Henke (Germany) Susi Lohrmann	(Netherlands) Susanne Trik (Netherlands) Henriëtte van Aalderen	6–4, 6–3
1997	(Czech Republic) Hana Šromová (Czech Republic) Alena Vašková	(Germany) Susi Lohrmann (Austria) Kerstin Marent	6–3, 6–3
1996	(Germany) Athina Briegel (Germany) Susi Lohrmann	(Austria) Christina Habernigg (Slovakia) Lenka Zacharová	6–3, 7–5
1995–91	—N/a		
