= Élodie Le Bescond =

French tennis player

- Country (sports): France
- Born: 12 February 1980 (age 45)
- Turned pro: 1994
- Retired: 2007
- Plays: Right (two-handed backhand)
- Prize money: $51,399

Singles
- Career record: 112–141
- Highest ranking: No. 264 (11 June 2001)

Grand Slam singles results
- French Open: Q1 (1998, 2001, 2002)

Doubles
- Career record: 42–59
- Career titles: 0 WTA, 2 ITF
- Highest ranking: No. 249 (29 April 2002)

Grand Slam doubles results
- French Open: 2R (2001)

Grand Slam mixed doubles results
- French Open: 1R (2001)

Élodie Le Bescond (born 12 February 1980) is a French former professional tennis player.

Le Bescond has a career-high singles ranking by the WTA of 264, achieved on 11 June 2001. She also has a career-high WTA doubles ranking of 249, achieved on 29 April 2002. Le Bescond won two doubles titles on the ITF Women's Circuit. She made her WTA Tour main-draw debut at the 2001 Internationaux de Tennis Feminin Nice in the doubles event, partnering Anne-Laure Heitz. Le Bescond retired from professional tennis in 2007.

== ITF Circuit finals ==
$25,000 tournaments
$10,000 tournaments

=== Singles (0–2) ===
Result	Date	Tier	Tournament	Surface	Opponent	Score
Loss	26 January 1998	10,000	Dinan, France	Clay (i)	(France) Émilie Loit	1–6, 1–6
Loss	22 January 2001	10,000	Jersey, Great Britain	Hard (i)	(United Kingdom) Anne Keothavong	3–6, 2–6

=== Doubles (2–2) ===
Result	Date	Tier	Tournament	Surface	Partner	Opponents	Score
Win	21 April 1997	10,000	Guimarães, Portugal	Hard	(Tunisia) Selima Sfar	(France) Kildine Chevalier (Czech Republic) Jindra Gabrisová	6–4, 6–2
Loss	11 May 1998	10,000	Le Touquet, France	Clay	(Tunisia) Selima Sfar	(France) Vanina Casanova (Argentina) Romina Ottoboni	6–7, 0–1 ret.
Win	25 June 2000	10,000	Montemor-o-Novo, Portugal	Clay	(France) Victoria Courmes	(Italy) Anna Floris (Italy) Giulia Meruzzi	4–6, 6–4, 7–6(4)
Loss	21 October 2001	25,000	Saint-Raphaël, France	Hard (i)	(France) Anne-Laure Heitz	(France) Caroline Dhenin (New Zealand) Shelley Stephens	0–6, 5–7
