= Libuše Průšová =

Czech tennis player

- Country (sports): Czech Republic
- Born: 13 July 1979 (age 45); Valašské Meziříčí, Czechoslovakia
- Height: 1.76 m (5 ft 9 in)
- Turned pro: 1994
- Retired: 2006
- Plays: Right-handed (two-handed backhand)
- Prize money: $333,848

Singles
- Career record: 307–223
- Career titles: 11 ITF
- Highest ranking: 103 (21 October 2002)

Grand Slam singles results
- Australian Open: 1R (2003, 2004)
- French Open: 1R (2003, 2005)
- Wimbledon: Q3 (2002)
- US Open: Q3 (2002)

Doubles
- Career record: 107–87
- Career titles: 6 ITF
- Highest ranking: 46 (7 June 2004)

Grand Slam doubles results
- Australian Open: SF (2004)
- French Open: 1R (2004)
- Wimbledon: 1R (2004)
- US Open: 1R (2004)

Other doubles tournaments
- Olympic Games: 1R (2004)

Grand Slam mixed doubles results
- Wimbledon: 1R (2004)

Libuše Průšová (born 13 July 1979) is a former professional Czech tennis player.

In her career, Průšová won eleven singles and six doubles titles on the ITF Circuit. On 21 October 2002, she reached her best singles ranking of world No. 103. On 7 June 2004, she peaked at No. 46 in the WTA doubles rankings.

== WTA career finals ==
=== Doubles: 1 (runner-up) ===
Result	Date	Tournament	Tier	Surface	Partner	Opponents	Score
Loss	Jul 2003	Warsaw Open, Poland	Tier III	Clay	(Estonia) Maret Ani	(Ukraine) Tatiana Perebiynis (Croatia) Silvija Talaja	4–6, 2–6

== ITF finals ==
=== Singles (11–7) ===
Legend $100,000 tournaments $75,000 tournaments $50,000 tournaments $25,000 tournaments $10,000 tournaments	Finals by surface Hard (1–0) Clay (8–7) Grass (0–0) Carpet (2–0)

Result	No.	Date	Tournament	Surface	Opponent	Score
Win	1.	12 September 1994	ITF Umag, Croatia	Clay	(Czech Republic) Sylva Nesvadbová	6–4, 6–1
Loss	1.	26 September 1994	ITF Bratislava, Slovakia	Clay	(Czech Republic) Adriana Gerši	3–6, 1–6
Win	2.	19 June 1995	ITF Staré Splavy, Czech Republic	Clay	(Czech Republic) Jana Lubasová	6–0, 6–1
Loss	2.	21 April 1997	ITF Prostějov, Czech Republic	Clay	(Czech Republic) Kateřina Šišková	6–0, 2–6, 1–6
Win	3.	26 May 1997	ITF Warsaw, Poland	Clay	(Czech Republic) Hana Šromová	6–2, 6–7^{(3–7)}, 6–4
Loss	3.	18 August 1997	ITF Valašské Meziříčí, Czech Republic	Clay	(Czech Republic) Kateřina Šišková	2–6, 1–6
Loss	4.	17 August 1998	ITF Valašské Meziříčí, Czech Republic	Clay	(Slovakia) Martina Suchá	6–3, 3–6, 1–6
Win	4.	24 August 1998	ITF Plzeň, Czech Republic	Clay	(Poland) Anna Bieleń-Żarska	6–4, 6–3
Win	5.	7 September 1998	ITF Zadar, Croatia	Clay	(Poland) Katarzyna Strączy	7–5, 6–0
Win	6.	30 November 1998	ITF Přerov, Czech Republic	Carpet (i)	(Czech Republic) Zuzana Ondrášková	6–3, 6–3
Loss	5.	24 May 1999	ITF Warsaw, Poland	Clay	(Croatia) Jelena Kostanić	6–4, 3–6, 2–6
Win	7.	23 August 1999	ITF Bucharest, Romania	Clay	(Hungary) Zsófia Gubacsi	6–1, 6–1
Win	8.	11 October 1999	ITF Plzeň, Czech Republic	Clay	(Czech Republic) Hana Šromová	6–4, 6–1
Win	9.	3 December 2001	ITF Průhonice, Czech Republic	Carpet (i)	(Czech Republic) Magdalena Zděnovcová	6–3, 6–3
Loss	6.	18 February 2002	ITF Las Palmas, Spain	Clay	(Russia) Dinara Safina	6–2, 2–6, 1–6
Loss	7.	11 March 2002	ITF Makarska, Croatia	Clay	(Croatia) Jelena Pandžić	1–6, 6–2, 6–7^{(5–7)}
Win	10.	22 July 2002	ITF Český Krumlov, Czech Republic	Clay	(Czech Republic) Sandra Kleinová	3–6, 6–4, 6–3
Win	11.	13 December 2004	ITF Valašské Meziříčí, Czech Republic	Hard (i)	(Czech Republic) Lucie Šafářová	7–6^{(9–7)}, 6–4

=== Doubles: 17 (6–11) ===
Legend $100,000 tournaments $75,000 tournaments $50,000 tournaments $25,000 tournaments $10,000 tournaments	Finals by surface Hard (1–2) Clay (3–7) Grass (0–0) Carpet (2–2)

Result	No.	Date	Tournament	Surface	Partner	Opponents	Score
Loss	1.	26 September 1994	ITF Bratislava, Slovakia	Clay	(Czech Republic) Alena Vašková	(Czech Republic) Milena Nekvapilová (Czech Republic) Martina Špačková	6–7^{(6–8)}, 3–6
Loss	2.	9 June 1997	ITF Kędzierzyn-Koźle, Poland	Clay	(Czech Republic) Zuzana Průšová	(Czech Republic) Jana Macurová (Czech Republic) Milena Nekvapilová	4–6, 2–6
Loss	3.	8 December 1997	ITF Vítkovice, Czech Republic	Carpet (i)	(Czech Republic) Michaela Paštiková	(Germany) Magdalena Kučerová (Germany) Gabriela Kučerová	3–6, 4–6
Loss	4.	7 September 1998	ITF Zadar, Croatia	Clay	(Poland) Anna Bieleń-Żarska	(France) Camille Pin (Croatia) Ivana Višić	6–7^{(3–7)}, 6–7^{(4–7)}
Win	1.	30 November 1998	ITF Přerov, Czech Republic	Carpet (i)	(Czech Republic) Renata Kučerová	(Czech Republic) Olga Blahotová (Czech Republic) Eva Martincová	6–7^{(3–7)}, 6–1, 6–2
Loss	5.	16 August 1999	ITF Valašské Meziříčí, Czech Republic	Clay	(Poland) Anna Bieleń-Żarska	(Czech Republic) Petra Kučová (Czech Republic) Gabriela Navrátilová	5–7, 6–2, 3–6
Loss	6.	12 November 2001	ITF Stupava, Slovakia	Hard (i)	(Czech Republic) Petra Cetkovská	(Russia) Galina Fokina (Hungary) Eszter Molnár	3–6, 4–6
Loss	7.	25 November 2002	ITF Prague-Průhonice, Czech Republic	Carpet (i)	(Czech Republic) Renata Voráčová	(Czech Republic) Sandra Kleinová (Slovakia) Ľubomíra Kurhajcová	6–7^{(12–14)}, 3–6
Loss	8.	7 July 2003	ITF Vittel, France	Clay	(Czech Republic) Eva Birnerová	(Ukraine) Yuliya Beygelzimer (Belarus) Tatiana Poutchek	3–6, 2–6
Win	2.	14 September 2003	ITF Bordeaux, France	Clay	(Estonia) Maret Ani	(Czech Republic) Iveta Benešová (Czech Republic) Olga Blahotová	6–3, 6–4
Win	3.	21 September 2003	ITF Biella, Italy	Clay	(Slovakia) Ľubomíra Kurhajcová	(Germany) Martina Müller (Czech Republic) Lenka Němečková	6–2, 6–4
Loss	9.	6 October 2003	ITF Latina, Italy	Clay	(Estonia) Maret Ani	(Italy) Mara Santangelo (Italy) Roberta Vinci	6–3, 2–6, 4–6
Win	4.	8 December 2003	ITF Ostrava, Czech Republic	Carpet (i)	(Czech Republic) Barbora Strýcová	(Czech Republic) Iveta Benešová (Czech Republic) Michaela Paštiková	6–2, 6–4
Loss	10.	15 December 2003	ITF Valašské Meziříčí, Czech Republic	Hard (i)	(Estonia) Maret Ani	(Czech Republic) Iveta Benešová (Czech Republic) Michaela Paštiková	w/o
Win	5.	31 May 2004	ITF Prostějov, Czech Republic	Clay	(Czech Republic) Barbora Strýcová	(China) Peng Shuai (China) Xie Yan-ze	6–1, 6–3
Win	6.	15 November 2005	ITF Prague-Průhonice, Czech Republic	Hard (i)	(Czech Republic) Lucie Hradecká	(Czech Republic) Olga Blahotová (Czech Republic) Eva Hrdinová	6–3, 3–6, 6–3
Loss	11.	31 July 2006	ITF Baden-Baden, Germany	Clay	(Czech Republic) Barbora Strýcová	(Slovakia) Jarmila Gajdošová (Portugal) Frederica Piedade	5–7, 6–4, 6–7^{(6–8)}

== Performance timelines ==
Key
W	F	SF	QF	#R	RR	Q#	DNQ	A	NH

(W) winner; (F) finalist; (SF) semifinalist; (QF) quarterfinalist; (#R) rounds 4, 3, 2, 1; (RR) round-robin stage; (Q#) qualification round; (DNQ) did not qualify; (A) absent; (NH) not held; (SR) strike rate (events won / competed); (W–L) win–loss record.

=== Singles ===
Tournament	1993	1994	1995	1996	1997	1998	1999	2000	2001	2002	2003	2004	2005	2006	2007	W–L
Grand Slam tournaments
Australian Open	A	A	A	A	A	A	A	Q2	A	A	1R	1R	Q1	A	A	0–2
French Open	A	A	A	A	A	A	A	Q1	A	Q3	1R	Q1	1R	A	A	0–2
Wimbledon	A	A	A	A	A	A	A	Q2	A	Q3	Q2	Q2	Q1	A	A	0–0
US Open	A	A	A	A	A	A	A	Q2	A	Q3	Q1	Q1	Q2	Q2	A	0–0
Win–loss	0–0	0–0	0–0	0–0	0–0	0–0	0–0	0–0	0–0	0–0	0–2	0–1	0–1	0–0	0–0	0–4
Olympic Games
Summer Olympics	Not held			A	Not held			A	Not held			A	Not held			0–0
Career statistics
Tournaments played	1	13	13	16	17	13	18	23	7	23	28	27	21	6	1	227
Finals (W–L)	0–0	1–1	1–0	0–0	1–2	3–1	2–1	0–0	1–0	1–2	0–0	1–0	0–0	0–0	0–0	11–7
Overall win–loss	1–1	17–12	19–14	13–16	30–17	27–10	28–16	24–23	10–6	51–22	21–29	34–28	27–21	3–6	2–1	307–223
Year-end ranking	—	▲432	▲303	▼405	▲319	▲305	▲229	▲192	▼963	▲103	▼213	▲188	▲172	▼441	—	$333,879

=== Doubles ===
Tournament	1993	1994	1995	1996	1997	1998	1999	2000	2001	2002	2003	2004	2005	2006	2007	W–L
Grand Slam tournaments
Australian Open	A	A	A	A	A	A	A	A	A	A	A	SF	1R	A	A	4–2
French Open	A	A	A	A	A	A	A	A	A	A	A	1R	A	A	A	0–1
Wimbledon	A	A	A	A	A	A	A	A	A	A	A	1R	A	A	A	0–1
US Open	A	A	A	A	A	A	A	A	A	A	A	1R	A	A	A	0–1
Win–loss	0–0	0–0	0–0	0–0	0–0	0–0	0–0	0–0	0–0	0–0	0–0	4–4	0–1	0–0	0–0	4–5
Olympic Games
Summer Olympics	Not held			A	Not held			A	Not held			1R	Not held			0–1
Career statistics
Tournaments played	1	4	6	7	10	4	4	4	4	6	14	21	4	5	1	95
Finals (W–L)	0–0	0–1	0–0	0–0	0–2	1–1	0–1	0–0	0–1	0–1	3–3	1–0	1–0	0–1	0–0	6–11
Overall win–loss	0–1	5–4	6–6	6–7	9–10	7–3	8–3	3–4	5–4	10–6	25–10	12–20	7–3	3–5	1–1	107–87
Year-end ranking	—	—	—	—	—	—	—	—	—	▲238	▲94	▲76	▼512	▲320	—	$333,879
