= Elena Tatarkova =

Ukrainian tennis player

Elena Tatarkova (Feltham) Олена Tатаркова
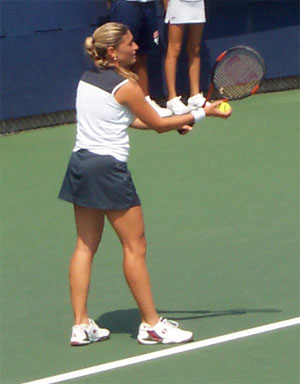
- Country (sports): Ukraine
- Residence: Kyiv, Ukraine
- Born: 22 August 1976 (age 49) Dushanbe, Tajik SSR, Soviet Union
- Height: 1.70 m (5 ft 7 in)
- Turned pro: 1993
- Retired: 2006
- Plays: Left-handed (two-handed backhand)
- Prize money: $861,974

Singles
- Career record: 300–237
- Career titles: 0 WTA, 4 ITF
- Highest ranking: No. 45 (18 January 1999)

Grand Slam singles results
- Australian Open: 1R (1998, 1999, 2002)
- French Open: 3R (1998)
- Wimbledon: 2R (1998, 1999)
- US Open: 1R (1998, 1999)

Doubles
- Career record: 302–176
- Career titles: 4 WTA, 25 ITF
- Highest ranking: No. 9 (5 July 1999)

Grand Slam doubles results
- Australian Open: 3R (1998, 1999)
- French Open: SF (2001)
- Wimbledon: F (1999)
- US Open: 2R (1997, 1998, 2003)

Elena Tatarkova or Olena Tatarkova (Ukrainian: Олена Tатаркова, born 22 August 1976) is a former professional tennis player from Ukraine.

She won four doubles titles on WTA Tour, and four singles and 25 doubles titles on the ITF Women's Circuit. Her best career result came in doubles; she reached the 1999 Wimbledon final with partner Mariaan de Swardt, which they lost to Lindsay Davenport and Corina Morariu. Tatarkova also made the 2001 French Open doubles semifinals with Justine Henin. She reached a career-high singles ranking of world No. 45, and highest doubles ranking of No. 9, both in 1999.

Since retiring from professional tennis in 2004, she married Timothy Feltham in September 2007 and is mother to Stanley (Apr 2009) and Austin (Feb 2012)

== Grand Slam performance timelines ==
Key
W	F	SF	QF	#R	RR	Q#	DNQ	A	NH

(W) winner; (F) finalist; (SF) semifinalist; (QF) quarterfinalist; (#R) rounds 4, 3, 2, 1; (RR) round-robin stage; (Q#) qualification round; (DNQ) did not qualify; (A) absent; (NH) not held; (SR) strike rate (events won / competed); (W–L) win–loss record.

=== Singles ===
Tournament	1994	1995	1996	1997	1998	1999	2000	2001	2002	2003	2004	W–L
Australian Open	A	LQ	A	A	1R	1R	LQ	A	1R	LQ	LQ	0–3
French Open	A	A	LQ	LQ	3R	1R	LQ	LQ	LQ	LQ	LQ	2–2
Wimbledon	LQ	A	A	LQ	2R	2R	A	LQ	1R	LQ	LQ	2–3
US Open	A	A	LQ	LQ	1R	1R	A	LQ	LQ	LQ	LQ	0–2
Win–loss	0–0	0–0	0–0	0–0	3–4	1–4	0–0	0–0	0–2	0–0	0–0	4–10
Year-end ranking	221	192	196	136	47	120	256	213	166	126	260	

=== Doubles ===
Tournament	1996	1997	1998	1999	2000	2001	2002	2003	2004	W–L
Australian Open	A	A	3R	3R	1R	A	1R	2R	1R	5–6
French Open	1R	A	1R	1R	2R	SF	2R	1R	1R	6–8
Wimbledon	A	1R	2R	F	A	1R	3R	2R	1R	9–7
US Open	A	2R	2R	1R	A	1R	1R	2R	1R	3–7
Win–loss	0–1	1–2	4–4	7–4	1–2	4–3	3–4	3–4	0–4	23–28
Year-end ranking	171	91	22	19	77	38	61	47	95	

== Grand Slam tournament finals ==
=== Doubles: 1 (runner-up) ===
Result	Year	Championship	Surface	Partner	Opponents	Score
Loss	1999	Wimbledon	Grass	(South Africa) Mariaan de Swardt	(United States) Lindsay Davenport (United States) Corina Morariu	4–6, 4–6

== WTA Tour finals ==
=== Doubles: 12 (4 titles, 8 runner-ups) ===
Legend
Grand Slam tournaments (0–1)
Tier I (0–0)
Tier II (0–3)
Tier III (0–3)
Tier IV & V (4–1)

Result	No.	Date	Tournament	Surface	Partner	Opponents	Score
Loss	1.	Aug 1998	Stanford Classic, United States	Hard	(Latvia) Larisa Savchenko	(United States) Lindsay Davenport (Belarus) Natalia Zvereva	4–6, 4–6
Loss	2.	Aug 1998	Los Angeles Classic, United States	Hard	(Thailand) Tamarine Tanasugarn	(Switzerland) Martina Hingis (Belarus) Natalia Zvereva	4–6, 2–6
Loss	3.	Oct 1998	Zurich Open, Switzerland	Hard (i)	(South Africa) Mariaan de Swardt	(United States) Venus Williams (United States) Serena Williams	7–5, 1–6, 3–6
Loss	4.	Oct 1998	Luxembourg Open	Carpet (i)	(Latvia) Larisa Savchenko	(Russia) Elena Likhovtseva (Japan) Ai Sugiyama	7–6^{(7–3)}, 3–6, 0–2 ret.
Win	1.	Jan 1999	Hobart International, Australia	Hard	(South Africa) Mariaan de Swardt	(France) Alexia Dechaume-Balleret (France) Émilie Loit	6–1, 6–2
Loss	5.	Jul 1999	Wimbledon, United Kingdom	Grass	(South Africa) Mariaan de Swardt	(United States) Lindsay Davenport (United States) Corina Morariu	4–6, 4–6
Loss	6.	Feb 2000	Oklahoma Cup, United States	Hard (i)	(Thailand) Tamarine Tanasugarn	(United States) Corina Morariu (United States) Kimberly Po	4–6, 6–4, 2–6
Win	2.	Feb 2002	Memphis International, United States	Hard (i)	(Japan) Ai Sugiyama	(United States) Melissa Middleton (United States) Brie Rippner	6–4, 2–6, 6–0
Loss	7.	Apr 2003	Casablanca Grand Prix, Morocco	Clay	(Slovakia) Henrieta Nagyová	(Argentina) Gisela Dulko (Argentina) Maria-Emilia Salerni	3–6, 4–6
Win	3.	Apr 2003	Budapest Grand Prix, Hungary	Clay	(Hungary) Petra Mandula	(Spain) Conchita Martínez Granados (Ukraine) Tatiana Perebiynis	6–3, 6–1
Win	4.	Aug 2003	Nordic Light Open, Finland	Clay	(Russia) Eugenia Kulikovskaya	(Ukraine) Tatiana Perebiynis (Croatia) Silvija Talaja	6–2, 6–4
Loss	8.	Oct 2003	Luxembourg Open	Hard (i)	(Germany) Marlene Weingärtner	(Russia) Maria Sharapova (Thailand) Tamarine Tanasugarn	1–6, 4–6

== ITF Circuit finals ==
Legend
$100,000 tournaments
$75,000 tournaments
$50,000 tournaments
$25,000 tournaments
$10,000 tournaments

=== Singles: 11 (4–7) ===
Result	No.	Date	Tournament	Surface	Opponent	Score
Loss	1.	24 May 1993	ITF Bytom, Poland	Clay	(Germany) Adriana Barna	6–3, 3–6, 4–6
Loss	2.	16 August 1993	ITF Szczecin, Poland	Clay	(Belgium) Vanessa Matthys	2–6, 7–5, 6–7^{(3)}
Loss	3.	10 October 1993	ITF Kyiv, Ukraine	Clay	(Moldova) Svetlana Komleva	6–3, 3–6, 6–7^{(4)}
Win	1.	31 October 1993	ITF Jūrmala, Latvia	Hard	(Latvia) Oksana Bushevitsa	6–1, 5–7, 6–4
Loss	4.	29 October 1995	ITF Poitiers, France	Hard	(Belarus) Olga Barabanschikova	3–6, 1–6
Loss	5.	23 February 1997	ITF Redbridge, United Kingdom	Hard (i)	(Spain) María Sánchez Lorenzo	1–6, 4–6
Loss	6.	13 October 1997	ITF Southampton, United Kingdom	Carpet (i)	(Russia) Evgenia Kulikovskaya	0–6, 6–4, 6–7^{(5)}
Win	2.	1 March 1998	ITF Bushey, United Kingdom	Carpet (i)	(Federal Republic of Yugoslavia) Dragana Zarić	6–2, 4–6, 6–0
Win	3.	31 July 2000	Open Saint-Gaudens, France	Clay	(Tunisia) Selima Sfar	6–4, 6–4
Win	4.	22 September 2003	Batumi Ladies Open, Georgia	Hard	(Israel) Evgenia Linetskaya	1–6, 6–4, 6–3
Loss	7.	28 November 2004	ITF Opole, Poland	Carpet (i)	(Germany) Angelique Kerber	2–6, 2–6

=== Doubles: 36 (25–11) ===
Result	No.	Date	Tournament	Surface	Partner	Opponents	Score
Win	1.	24 May 1993	ITF Bytom, Poland	Clay	(Ukraine) Natalia Biletskaya	(Bulgaria) Teodora Nedeva (Bulgaria) Antoaneta Pandjerova	w/o
Win	2.	29 August 1993	ITF Gryfino, Poland	Clay	(Poland) Aleksandra Olsza	(Poland) Monika Starosta (Czech Republic) Alena Vašková	7–6^{(4)}, 4–6, 7–5
Win	3.	5 September 1993	ITF Burgas, Bulgaria	Hard	(Bulgaria) Svetlana Krivencheva	(Sweden) Camilla Persson (Sweden) Anna-Karin Svensson	5–7, 6–2, 6–3
Win	4.	12 September 1993	ITF Varna, Bulgaria	Hard	(Ukraine) Natalia Bondarenko	(Romania) Isabela Martin (Bulgaria) Maya Stankova	6–2, 6–4
Loss	1.	18 October 1993	ITF Šiauliai, Lithuania	Hard (i)	(Ukraine) Natalia Bondarenko	(Ukraine) Talina Beiko (Ukraine) Tanja Tsiganii	3–6, 1–6
Win	5.	25 October 1993	ITF Jūrmala, Latvia	Hard	(Ukraine) Natalia Bondarenko	(Poland) Aleksandra Olsza (Switzerland) Miroslava Vavrinec	7–6^{(5)}, 6–2
Loss	2.	3 October 1994	ITF Kyiv, Ukraine	Clay	(Ukraine) Natalia Biletskaya	(Belarus) Natalia Noreiko (Belarus) Marina Stets	6–2, 5–7, 3–6
Loss	3.	9 July 1995	ITF Stuttgart, Germany	Clay	(Federal Republic of Yugoslavia) Tatjana Ječmenica	(Slovakia) Henrieta Nagyová (Slovakia) Radka Zrubáková	3–6, 6–7
Win	6.	27 August 1995	ITF Sochi, Russia	Hard	(United States) Corina Morariu	(Russia) Natalia Egorova (Finland) Petra Thorén	6–3, 7–5
Win	7.	16 October 1995	ITF Flensburg, Germany	Carpet (i)	(United Kingdom) Yvette Basting	(Germany) Sandra Klösel (France) Amélie Mauresmo	6–4, 2–6, 6–2
Win	8.	6 May 1996	ITF Szczecin, Poland	Clay	(Ukraine) Elena Brioukhovets	(Czech Republic) Lenka Cenková (Czech Republic) Adriana Gerši	6–2, 6–1
Win	9.	16 June 1996	ITF Tashkent, Uzbekistan	Clay	(Ukraine) Elena Brioukhovets	(Germany) Katrin Kilsch (Australia) Robyn Mawdsley	6–4, 6–2
Loss	4.	2 February 1997	ITF Prostejov, Czech Republic	Carpet (i)	(Poland) Aleksandra Olsza	(Slovakia) Denisa Krajčovičová (Hungary) Andrea Temesvári	2–6, 3–6
Loss	5.	2 March 1997	ITF Bushey, United Kingdom	Carpet (i)	(Germany) Kirstin Freye	(Ukraine) Olga Lugina (United Kingdom) Clare Wood	6–7^{(6)}, 7–6^{(6)}, 1–6
Win	10.	17 March 1997	ITF Reims, France	Clay (i)	(Bulgaria) Svetlana Krivencheva	(Germany) Silke Meier (Austria) Petra Schwarz	6–2, 6–2
Loss	6.	9 June 1997	ITF Budapest, Hungary	Clay	(Colombia) Fabiola Zuluaga	(Hungary) Katalin Marosi (Argentina) Veronica Stele	3–6, 3–6
Win	11.	4 August 1997	ITF Sopot, Poland	Clay	(Bulgaria) Svetlana Krivencheva	(Czech Republic) Radka Bobková (Czech Republic) Lenka Němečková	7–6^{(7)}, 6–3
Win	12.	21 February 1998	ITF Redbridge, United Kingdom	Hard (i)	(Hungary) Virág Csurgó	(Germany) Kirstin Freye (Israel) Hila Rosen	7–5, 6–3
Loss	7.	8 June 1998	ITF Sochi, Russia	Hard	(Georgia (country)) Nino Louarsabishvili	(Japan) Saori Obata (Japan) Kaoru Shibata	6–3, 4–6, 2–6
Win	13.	31 July 2000	Open Saint-Gaudens, France	Clay	(Bulgaria) Svetlana Krivencheva	(Hungary) Eszter Molnár (Croatia) Maja Palaveršić	3–6, 7–5, 6–3
Win	14.	2 October 2000	ITF Albuquerque, United States	Hard	(United States) Brie Rippner	(Australia) Lisa McShea (India) Nirupama Sanjeev	6–4, 6–4
Win	15.	22 October 2000	ITF Largo, United States	Hard	(United States) Brie Rippner	(United States) Dawn Buth (United States) Sandra Cacic	6–2, 6–4
Win	16.	29 October 2000	ITF Dallas, United States	Hard	(United States) Brie Rippner	(India) Nirupama Sanjeev (Japan) Nana Smith	6–3, 3–6, 6–3
Win	17.	19 November 2000	ITF Naples, United States	Clay	(Japan) Nana Smith	(Estonia) Maret Ani (Italy) Valentina Sassi	5–3, 2–4, 2–4, 5–3, 4–1
Loss	8.	5 February 2001	ITF Rockford, United States	Hard (i)	(Bulgaria) Svetlana Krivencheva	(United States) Katie Schlukebir (United States) Kristen Schlukebir	6–7^{(4)}, 1–6
Win	18.	12 February 2001	Midland Tennis Classic, United States	Hard (i)	(Netherlands) Yvette Basting	(United States) Jennifer Hopkins (Slovenia) Petra Rampre	3–6, 7–6^{(4)}, 6–4
Win	19.	4 March 2001	ITF Minneapolis, United States	Hard (i)	(Netherlands) Yvette Basting	(Belgium) Laurence Courtois (Australia) Alicia Molik	7–5, 7–6^{(0)}
Loss	9.	21 October 2001	ITF Southampton, UK	Hard (i)	(Bulgaria) Lubomira Bacheva	(South Africa) Nannie de Villiers (Kazakhstan) Irina Selyutina	6–7^{(5)}, 6–2, 2–6
Win	20.	5 February 2002	Midland Tennis Classic, United States	Hard (i)	(Chinese Taipei) Janet Lee	(Bulgaria) Maria Geznenge (Czech Republic) Michaela Paštiková	6–1, 6–3
Loss	10.	12 November 2002	ITF Eugene, United States	Hard	(Russia) Evgenia Kulikovskaya	(Japan) Nana Smith (Venezuela) Milagros Sequera	6–3, 2–6, 4–6
Win	21.	16 March 2003	ITF Kaunas, Lithuania	Hard (i)	(Belarus) Darya Kustova	(Lithuania) Aurelija Misevičiūtė (Lithuania) Lina Stančiūtė	6–1, 7–6^{(6)}
Win	22.	21 September 2003	ITF Tbilisi, Georgia	Clay	(Belarus) Darya Kustova	(Belarus) Nadejda Ostrovskaya (Kazakhstan) Galina Voskoboeva	2–6, 6–2, 7–6^{(5)}
Win	23.	28 September 2003	Batumi Ladies Open, Georgia	Hard	(Belarus) Darya Kustova	(Russia) Goulnara Fattakhetdinova (Russia) Galina Fokina	1–6, 6–1, 6–2
Loss	11.	28 March 2004	ITF St.Petersburg, Russia	Hard (i)	(Belarus) Darya Kustova	(Russia) Maria Goloviznina (Russia) Evgenia Kulikovskaya	5–7, 1–6
Win	24.	18 April 2004	Open de Biarritz, France	Clay	(Ukraine) Mariya Koryttseva	(Ukraine) Alona Bondarenko (Ukraine) Valeria Bondarenko	7–5, 6–0
Win	25.	7 November 2004	ITF Shenzhen, China	Hard	(Japan) Rika Fujiwara	(China) Yan Zi (China) Zheng Jie	6–4, 1–6, 6–1

== Top 10 wins ==
#	Player	Rank	Event	Surface	Rd	Score	ET Rank
1998
1.	(Romania) Irina Spîrlea	No. 9	San Diego Open, US	Hard	2R	6–2, 6–2	No. 63
