= 2001 French Open – Men's doubles =

Men's doubles
- 2001 French Open

Final
- Champion: (India) Leander Paes (India) Mahesh Bhupathi
- Runner-up: (Czech Republic) Petr Pála (Czech Republic) Pavel Vízner
- Score: 7–6^{(7–5)}, 6–3
- Date: 9 June 2001

Details
- Draw: 64
- Seeds: 16

Events
| Singles | men | women | | boys | girls |
| Doubles | men | women | mixed | boys | girls |
| WC Singles | men | women | quad |
| WC Doubles | men | women | quad |
| Legends | −45 | 45+ | women |
- French Open

The 2001 French Open was the second Grand Slam event of 2001 and the 100th edition of the French Open. It took place at the Stade Roland Garros in Paris, France, from late May through early June, 2001.

Todd Woodbridge and Mark Woodforde were the defending champions, but Woodforde retired from tennis in 2000. Woodbridge played alongside Jonas Björkman, they lost to Michael Hill and Jeff Tarango in the quarterfinals.

Unseeded team Mahesh Bhupathi and Leander Paes won their title, defeating Petr Pála and Pavel Vízner in the final.

== Seeds ==
Champion seeds are indicated in bold text while text in italics indicates the round in which those seeds were eliminated.

1. (Sweden) Jonas Björkman / (Australia) Todd Woodbridge (quarterfinals)
2. (Canada) Daniel Nestor / (Australia) Sandon Stolle (third round)
3. (Czech Republic) Jiří Novák / (Czech Republic) David Rikl (third round)
4. (United States) Donald Johnson / (United States) Jared Palmer (first round)
5. (South Africa) Wayne Ferreira / (Russia) Yevgeny Kafelnikov (first round)
6. (Belarus) Max Mirnyi / (Germany) David Prinosil (third round)
7. (South Africa) Ellis Ferreira / (United States) Rick Leach (third round)
8. (Australia) Joshua Eagle / (Australia) Andrew Florent (third round)
9. (Australia) Wayne Arthurs / (Federal Republic of Yugoslavia) Nenad Zimonjić (first round)
10. (South Africa) David Adams / (Argentina) Martín García (first round)
11. (Australia) Michael Hill / (United States) Jeff Tarango (semifinals)
12. (Zimbabwe) Wayne Black / (Zimbabwe) Kevin Ullyett (third round)
13. (Czech Republic) Petr Pála / (Czech Republic) Pavel Vízner (final)
14. (The Bahamas) Mark Knowles / (United States) Brian MacPhie (third round)
15. (Brazil) Jaime Oncins / (Argentina) Daniel Orsanic (first round)
16. (Zimbabwe) Byron Black / (United States) Alex O'Brien (first round)

== Draw ==
Key

- Q = Qualifier
- WC = Wild card
- LL = Lucky loser
- Alt = Alternate
- ITF = ITF entry
- PR = Protected ranking
- SR = Special ranking
- SE = Special exempt
- JE = Junior exempt
- JR = Junior Accelerator Programme entrant
- CO = College Accelerator Programme entrant
- NG = Next Gen Accelerator Program entrant
- w/o = Walkover
- r = Retired
- d = Defaulted

=== Finals ===
Quarterfinals
1 | (Sweden) Jonas Björkman (Australia) Todd Woodbridge | 4 | **6** | 1
11 | (Australia) **Michael Hill** **(United States) Jeff Tarango** | **6** | 3 | **6**
(India) **Mahesh Bhupathi** **(India) Leander Paes** | **7** | **6**
(Czech Republic) Tomáš Cibulec (Czech Republic) Leoš Friedl | 5 | 4
(Sweden) Nicklas Kulti (France) Michaël Llodra | 3 | 6^{6}
13 | (Czech Republic) **Petr Pála** **(Czech Republic) Pavel Vízner** | **6** | **7**
(Argentina) Lucas Arnold Ker (Czech Republic) Cyril Suk | 6^{5} | 2
(France) **Arnaud Clément** **(France) Nicolas Escudé** | **7** | **6**

Semifinals
11 | (Australia) Michael Hill (United States) Jeff Tarango | 3 | **6** | 4
(India) **Mahesh Bhupathi** **(India) Leander Paes** | **6** | 3 | **6**
13 | (Czech Republic) **Petr Pála** **(Czech Republic) Pavel Vízner** | **7** | **6**
(France) Arnaud Clément (France) Nicolas Escudé | 5 | 4

Final
(India) **Mahesh Bhupathi** **(India) Leander Paes** | **7** | **6**
13 | (Czech Republic) Petr Pála (Czech Republic) Pavel Vízner | 6^{5} | 3

=== Top half ===
==== Section 1 ====
First round
1 | (Sweden) **J Björkman** **(Australia) T Woodbridge** | **6** | **6**
(Argentina) M Hood (Argentina) S Prieto | 2 | 2
(United States) **B Bryan** **(United States) M Bryan** | **6** | 5 | **6**
(Australia) P Kilderry (Australia) P Tramacchi | 1 | **7** | 4
(Spain) **A Martín** **(Argentina) M Rodríguez** | **6** | **7**
(Italy) M Bertolini (Italy) C Brandi | 2 | 6^{3}
14 | (The Bahamas) **M Knowles** **(United States) B MacPhie** | **6** | **6**
(France) G Carraz (Monaco) J-R Lisnard | 3 | 2
11 | (Australia) **M Hill** **(United States) J Tarango** | **6** | 4 | **6**
(Czech Republic) M Damm (Slovakia) D Hrbatý | 2 | **6** | 2
(Czech Republic) **F Čermák** **(Czech Republic) R Štěpánek** | **6** | **6**
(United States) D Bowen (Australia) J Kerr | 2 | 4
(South Africa) **M Barnard** **(Russia) A Olhovskiy** | **6** | **6**
(Netherlands) S Groen (Czech Republic) P Luxa | 1 | 2
8 | (Australia) **J Eagle** **(Australia) A Florent** | 6^{10} | **7** | **6**
(Spain) J Balcells (Germany) M-K Goellner | **7** | 6^{4} | 1

Second round
1 | (Sweden) **J Björkman** **(Australia) T Woodbridge** | **7** | **6**
(United States) B Bryan (United States) M Bryan | 5 | 4
(Spain) A Martín (Argentina) M Rodríguez | 3 | 2
14 | (The Bahamas) **M Knowles** **(United States) B MacPhie** | **6** | **6**
11 | (Australia) **M Hill** **(United States) J Tarango** | 1 | **6** | **7**
(Czech Republic) F Čermák (Czech Republic) R Štěpánek | **6** | 3 | 5
(South Africa) M Barnard (Russia) A Olhovskiy | 4 | 4
8 | (Australia) **J Eagle** **(Australia) A Florent** | **6** | **6**

Third round
1 | (Sweden) **J Björkman** **(Australia) T Woodbridge** | **6** | **6**
14 | (The Bahamas) M Knowles (United States) B MacPhie | 1 | 4
11 | (Australia) **M Hill** **(United States) J Tarango** | **6** | **6**
8 | (Australia) J Eagle (Australia) A Florent | 4 | 4

Quarterfinals
1 | (Sweden) J Björkman (Australia) T Woodbridge | 4 | **6** | 1
11 | (Australia) **M Hill** **(United States) J Tarango** | **6** | 3 | **6**

==== Section 2 ====
First round
3 | (Czech Republic) **J Novák** **(Czech Republic) D Rikl** | **6** | **6**
(Japan) T Shimada (South Africa) M Wakefield | 4 | 4
(Spain) **JI Carrasco** **(Czech Republic) O Fukárek** | **6** | **7**
(Argentina) S Roitman (Argentina) A Schneiter | 1 | 6^{6}
(Philippines) **E Taino** **(United States) J Waite** | **6** | 4 | **6**
(France) J Golmard (France) N Thomann | 4 | **6** | 3
(India) **M Bhupathi** **(India) L Paes** | 4 | **6** | **6**
15 | (Brazil) J Oncins (Argentina) D Orsanic | **6** | 4 | 3
(Czech Republic) **T Cibulec** **(Czech Republic) L Friedl** | **6** | **6**
10 | (South Africa) D Adams (Argentina) M García | 2 | 2
(South Africa) **J Coetzee** **(South Africa) B Haygarth** | 6^{4} | **6** | **6**
(France) J Benneteau (France) N Mahut | **7** | 2 | 3
(North Macedonia) **A Kitinov** **(United States) M Sprengelmeyer** | **7** | **6**
(Netherlands) J Siemerink (South Africa) G Stafford | 6^{3} | 3
6 | (Belarus) **M Mirnyi** **(Germany) D Prinosil** | 4 | **6** | **6**
(Australia) A Kratzmann (Switzerland) M Rosset | **6** | 0 | 0

Second round
3 | (Czech Republic) **J Novák** **(Czech Republic) D Rikl** | **6** | 3 | **11**
(Spain) JI Carrasco (Czech Republic) O Fukárek | 3 | **6** | 9
(Philippines) E Taino (United States) J Waite | 6^{4} | 1
(India) **M Bhupathi** **(India) L Paes** | **7** | **6**
(Czech Republic) **T Cibulec** **(Czech Republic) L Friedl** | **6** | **6**
(South Africa) J Coetzee (South Africa) B Haygarth | 4 | ;2
(North Macedonia) A Kitinov (United States) M Sprengelmeyer | 4 | **6** | 3
6 | (Belarus) **M Mirnyi** **(Germany) D Prinosil** | **6** | 3 | **6**

Third round
3 | (Czech Republic) J Novák (Czech Republic) D Rikl | 3 | 1
(India) **M Bhupathi** **(India) L Paes** | **6** | **6**
(Czech Republic) **T Cibulec** **(Czech Republic) L Friedl** | **6** | 6^{3} | **6**
6 | (Belarus) M Mirnyi (Germany) D Prinosil | 3 | **7** | 4

Quarterfinals
(India) **M Bhupathi** **(India) L Paes** | **7** | **6**
(Czech Republic) T Cibulec (Czech Republic) L Friedl | 5 | 4

=== Bottom half ===
==== Section 3 ====
First round
7 | (South Africa) **E Ferreira** **(United States) R Leach** | **7** | **6**
(South Africa) M Ondruska (South Africa) G Williams | 6^{3} | 2
(Spain) **T Carbonell** **(Spain) A Portas** | **7** | **6**
(Australia) T Crichton (Australia) A Fisher | 5 | 4
(Australia) **B Ellwood** **(Australia) P Hanley** | **6** | **6**
(Argentina) P Albano (Australia) D Macpherson | 2 | 2
(Sweden) **N Kulti** **(France) M Llodra** | **6** | **7**
9 | (Australia) W Arthurs (Federal Republic of Yugoslavia) N Zimonjić | 2 | 6^{6}
13 | (Czech Republic) **P Pála** **(Czech Republic) P Vízner** | **7** | 6^{4} | **6**
(United States) J-M Gambill (United States) A Roddick | 5 | **7** | 1
(South Africa) **N Godwin** **(South Africa) J Weir-Smith** | **6** | 3 | **8**
(South Africa) C Haggard (Belgium) T Vanhoudt | 4 | **6** | 6
(Austria) **J Knowle** **(Switzerland) L Manta** | **6** | **7**
(United States) P Goldstein (United States) J Thomas | 2 | 5
(Ecuador) **N Lapentti** **(Netherlands) S Schalken** | 1 | **7** | **6**
4 | (United States) D Johnson (United States) J Palmer | **6** | 6^{5} | 4

Second round
7 | (South Africa) **E Ferreira** **(United States) R Leach** | **6** | **6**
(Spain) T Carbonell (Spain) A Portas | 4 | 3
(Australia) B Ellwood (Australia) P Hanley | 6^{4} | 2
(Sweden) **N Kulti** **(France) M Llodra** | **7** | **6**
13 | (Czech Republic) **P Pála** **(Czech Republic) P Vízner** | **7** | 4 | **6**
(South Africa) N Godwin (South Africa) J Weir-Smith | 6^{1} | **6** | 4
(Austria) **J Knowle** **(Switzerland) L Manta** | **7** | **7**
(Ecuador) N Lapentti (Netherlands) S Schalken | 6^{1} | 6^{3}

Third round
7 | (South Africa) E Ferreira (United States) R Leach | 4 | **6** | 1
(Sweden) **N Kulti** **(France) M Llodra** | **6** | 3 | **6**
13 | (Czech Republic) **P Pála** **(Czech Republic) P Vízner** | **6** | **7**
(Austria) J Knowle (Switzerland) L Manta | 3 | 5

Quarterfinals
(Sweden) N Kulti (France) M Llodra | 3 | 6^{6}
13 | (Czech Republic) **P Pála** **(Czech Republic) P Vízner** | **6** | **7**

==== Section 4 ====
First round
(France) **J Boutter** **(France) F Santoro** | **6** | **6**
5 | (South Africa) W Ferreira (Russia) Y Kafelnikov | 2 | 4
(Argentina) **L Arnold** **(Czech Republic) C Suk** | **6** | **6**
(Israel) N Behr (Israel) E Ran | 4 | 2
(South Africa) **R Koenig** **(Germany) M Kohlmann** | **6** | **7**
(France) J-F Bachelot (France) C Kauffmann | 1 | 6^{2}
12 | (Zimbabwe) **W Black** **(Zimbabwe) K Ullyett** | **7** | **6**
(United States) S Humphries (United States) J Stark | 6^{2} | 2
(Sweden) **S Aspelin** **(Sweden) J Landsberg** | **7** | **6**
16 | (Zimbabwe) B Black (United States) A O'Brien | 6^{4} | 3
(France) **A Clément** **(France) N Escudé** | **6** | **6**
(Morocco) H Arazi (France) P-H Mathieu | 3 | 3
(Germany) **K Braasch** **(Germany) J Knippschild** | **6** | 6^{4} | **12**
(Germany) N Kiefer (Russia) M Safin | 2 | **7** | 10
2 | (Canada) **D Nestor** **(Australia) S Stolle** | **7** | **7**
(Spain) Á López Morón (Spain) G Puentes | 6^{5} | 5

Second round
(France) J Boutter (France) F Santoro
(Argentina) **L Arnold** **(Czech Republic) C Suk** | W-O
(South Africa) R Koenig (Germany) M Kohlmann | 6^{1} | **7** | 5
12 | (Zimbabwe) **W Black** **(Zimbabwe) K Ullyett** | **7** | 5 | **7**
(Sweden) S Aspelin (Sweden) J Landsberg | **6** | 1 | 2
(France) **A Clément** **(France) N Escudé** | 3 | **6** | **6**
(Germany) K Braasch (Germany) J Knippschild | 3 | **7** | 8
2 | (Canada) **D Nestor** **(Australia) S Stolle** | **6** | 5 | **10**

Third round
(Argentina) **L Arnold** **(Czech Republic) C Suk** | **7** | 2 | **6**
12 | (Zimbabwe) W Black (Zimbabwe) K Ullyett | 6^{3} | **6** | 3
(France) **A Clément** **(France) N Escudé** | 5 | **6** | **6**
2 | (Canada) D Nestor (Australia) S Stolle | **7** | 4 | 4

Quarterfinals
(Argentina) L Arnold (Czech Republic) C Suk | 6^{5} | 2
(France) **A Clément** **(France) N Escudé** | **7** | **6**
