= 2001 French Open – Mixed doubles =

Mixed doubles
- 2001 French Open

Final
- Champions: (Spain) Virginia Ruano Pascual (Spain) Tomás Carbonell
- Runners-up: (Argentina) Paola Suárez (Brazil) Jaime Oncins
- Score: 7–5, 6–3
- Date: 8 June 2001

Details
- Draw: 32
- Seeds: 8

Events
Singles	men	women		boys	girls
Doubles	men	women	mixed	boys	girls
WC Singles	men	women	quad
WC Doubles	men	women	quad
Legends	−45	45+	women
- French Open

The 2001 French Open was the second Grand Slam event of 2001 and the 100th edition of the French Open. It took place at the Stade Roland Garros in Paris, France, from late May through early June, 2001.

== Seeds ==
Champion seeds are indicated in bold text while text in italics indicates the round in which those seeds were eliminated.

1. (Australia) Rennae Stubbs / (Australia) Todd Woodbridge (quarterfinals)
2. (Zimbabwe) Cara Black / (Australia) Sandon Stolle (first round)
3. (Japan) Ai Sugiyama / (South Africa) Ellis Ferreira (first round)
4. (Spain) Arantxa Sánchez Vicario / (United States) Jared Palmer (second round)
5. (United States) Kimberly Po-Messerli / (United States) Donald Johnson (first round)
6. (United States) Nicole Arendt / (The Bahamas) Mark Knowles (second round)
7. (Austria) Barbara Schett / (Australia) Joshua Eagle (first round)
8. (France) Nathalie Tauziat / (South Africa) David Adams (first round)

== Draw ==
Key

- Q = Qualifier
- WC = Wild card
- LL = Lucky loser
- Alt = Alternate
- ITF = ITF entry
- PR = Protected ranking
- SR = Special ranking
- SE = Special exempt
- JE = Junior exempt
- JR = Junior Accelerator Programme entrant
- CO = College Accelerator Programme entrant
- NG = Next Gen Accelerator Program entrant
- w/o = Walkover
- r = Retired
- d = Defaulted

=== Finals ===
Semifinals
(Slovakia) Janette Husárová (Czech Republic) Petr Pála	**7^{7}**	3	1
**(Spain) Virginia Ruano Pascual** **(Spain) Tomás Carbonell**	6^{5}	**6**	**6**
**(Argentina) Paola Suárez** **(Brazil) Jaime Oncins**	**7**	4	**6**
(Russia) Elena Likhovtseva (India) Mahesh Bhupathi	5	**6**	2

Final
**(Spain) Virginia Ruano Pascual** **(Spain) Tomás Carbonell**	**7**	**6**
(Argentina) Paola Suárez (Brazil) Jaime Oncins	5	3

=== Top half ===
First round
1	**(Australia) R Stubbs** **(Australia) T Woodbridge**	**6**	**6**
(Argentina) L Montalvo (Argentina) M García	2	4
**(Italy) T Garbin** **(Czech Republic) P Vízner**	**6**	**7**
WC	(France) É Le Bescond (France) JF Bachelot	1	5
**(Slovakia) J Husárová** **(Czech Republic) P Pála**	6^{3}	**6**	**6**
(Slovenia) K Srebotnik (Federal Republic of Yugoslavia) N Zimonjić	**7^{7}**	3	4
**(Sweden) Å Carlsson** **(Sweden) N Kulti**	3	**7^{7}**	**6**
7	(Austria) B Schett (Australia) J Eagle	**6**	6^{5}	3
3	(Japan) A Sugiyama (South Africa) E Ferreira	**6**	3	4
**(Spain) V Ruano Pascual** **(Spain) T Carbonell**	1	**6**	**6**
WC	(France) C Pin (France) A Clément	4	2
**(Belgium) E Callens** **(South Africa) C Haggard**	**6**	**6**
WC	(Bulgaria) M Maleeva (France) M Llodra	**7**	4	1
**(France) AG Sidot** **(United States) R Leach**	5	**6**	**6**
**(Slovakia) K Habšudová** **(Czech Republic) D Rikl**	**6**	**6**
5	(United States) K Po-Messerli (United States) D Johnson	2	3

Second round
1	**(Australia) R Stubbs** **(Australia) T Woodbridge**	**7^{7}**	3	**6**
(Italy) T Garbin (Czech Republic) P Vízner	6^{2}	**6**	3
**(Slovakia) J Husárová** **(Czech Republic) P Pála**	w/o
(Sweden) Å Carlsson (Sweden) N Kulti
**(Spain) V Ruano Pascual** **(Spain) T Carbonell**	**6**	2	**6**
(Belgium) E Callens (South Africa) C Haggard	4	**6**	4
(France) AG Sidot (United States) R Leach	4	4
**(Slovakia) K Habšudová** **(Czech Republic) D Rikl**	**6**	**6**

Quarterfinals
1	(Australia) R Stubbs (Australia) T Woodbridge	6^{5}	**6**	1
**(Slovakia) J Husárová** **(Czech Republic) P Pála**	**7^{7}**	2	**6**
**(Spain) V Ruano Pascual** **(Spain) T Carbonell**	**6**	3	**7**
(Slovakia) K Habšudová (Czech Republic) D Rikl	3	**6**	5

Semifinals
(Slovakia) J Husárová (Czech Republic) P Pála	**7^{7}**	3	1
**(Spain) V Ruano Pascual** **(Spain) T Carbonell**	6^{5}	**6**	**6**

=== Bottom half ===
First round
8	(France) N Tauziat (South Africa) D Adams	4	5
**(United States) L Raymond** **(India) L Paes**	**6**	**7**
WC	(France) C Dhenin (France) N Coutelot	4	4
**(France) S Testud** **(Australia) A Florent**	**6**	**6**
(South Africa) L Huber (Zimbabwe) K Ullyett	6^{3}	4
**(Argentina) P Suárez** **(Brazil) J Oncins**	**7^{7}**	**6**
WC	(France) A Cocheteux (France) C Kauffmann	4	4
4	**(Spain) A Sánchez Vicario** **(United States) J Palmer**	**6**	**6**
6	**(United States) N Arendt** **(The Bahamas) M Knowles**	**6**	**6**
(Australia) N Pratt (United States) S Humphries	4	4
WC	(France) É Loit (France) S Huet	3	4
WC	**(France) A Fusai** **(France) J Golmard**	**6**	**6**
**(United States) M Navratilova** **(Belarus) M Mirnyi**	**6**	6^{2}	**6**
(Slovenia) T Križan (United States) J Tarango	1	**7^{7}**	3
**(Russia) E Likhovtseva** **(India) M Bhupathi**	**7**	**6**
2	(Zimbabwe) C Black (Australia) S Stolle	5	3

Second round
**(United States) L Raymond** **(India) L Paes**	w/o
(France) S Testud (Australia) A Florent
**(Argentina) P Suárez** **(Brazil) J Oncins**	**6**	5	**6**
4	(Spain) A Sánchez Vicario (United States) J Palmer	1	**7**	3
6	(United States) N Arendt (The Bahamas) M Knowles	**7**	4	0
WC	**(France) A Fusai** **(France) J Golmard**	5	**6**	**6**
(United States) M Navratilova (Belarus) M Mirnyi	4	**6**	4
**(Russia) E Likhovtseva** **(India) M Bhupathi**	**6**	3	**6**

Quarterfinals
(United States) L Raymond (India) L Paes	5	1
**(Argentina) P Suárez** **(Brazil) J Oncins**	**7**	**6**
WC	(France) A Fusai (France) J Golmard	3	4
**(Russia) E Likhovtseva** **(India) M Bhupathi**	**6**	**6**

Semifinals
**(Argentina) P Suárez** **(Brazil) J Oncins**	**7**	4	**6**
(Russia) E Likhovtseva (India) M Bhupathi	5	**6**	2
