= 2001 French Open – Women's doubles =

Women's doubles
- 2001 French Open

Final
- Champions: (Spain) Virginia Ruano Pascual (Argentina) Paola Suárez
- Runners-up: (Federal Republic of Yugoslavia) Jelena Dokić (Spain) Conchita Martínez
- Score: 6–2, 6–1
- Date: 10 June 2001

Details
- Draw: 64 (4 WC )
- Seeds: 16

Events
Singles	men	women		boys	girls
Doubles	men	women	mixed	boys	girls
WC Singles	men	women	quad
WC Doubles	men	women	quad
Legends	−45	45+	women
- French Open

Martina Hingis and Mary Pierce were the defending champions, but neither participated in this tournament.

Virginia Ruano Pascual and Paola Suárez won the title, defeating Jelena Dokić and Conchita Martínez in the final 6–2, 6–1. This was the first Grand Slam title for both Ruano Pascual and Suárez; they would later go on to win 8 Grand Slam Doubles titles together.

== Seeds ==
Champion seeds are indicated in bold text while text in italics indicates the round in which those seeds were eliminated.

1. (United States) Lisa Raymond / (Australia) Rennae Stubbs (semifinals)
2. (Spain) Virginia Ruano Pascual / (Argentina) Paola Suárez (champions)
3. (Zimbabwe) Cara Black / (Russia) Elena Likhovtseva (third round)
4. (United States) Kimberly Po-Messerli / (France) Nathalie Tauziat (quarterfinals)
5. (United States) Serena Williams / (United States) Venus Williams (withdrew)
6. (Belgium) Els Callens / (United States) Meghann Shaughnessy (third round)
7. (France) Alexandra Fusai / (Italy) Rita Grande (second round)
8. (United States) Nicole Arendt / (Netherlands) Caroline Vis (quarterfinals)
9. (United States) Martina Navratilova / (Spain) Arantxa Sánchez Vicario (first round)
10. (Germany) Anke Huber / (Austria) Barbara Schett (quarterfinals)
11. (Italy) Tathiana Garbin / (Slovakia) Janette Husárová (first round)
12. (South Africa) Liezel Huber / (Argentina) Laura Montalvo (second round)
13. (Slovenia) Tina Križan / (Slovenia) Katarina Srebotnik (first round)
14. (United States) Jennifer Capriati / (Japan) Ai Sugiyama (third round)
15. (Australia) Nicole Pratt / (Argentina) Patricia Tarabini (third round)
16. (Federal Republic of Yugoslavia) Jelena Dokic / (Spain) Conchita Martínez (final)
17. (South Africa) Amanda Coetzer / (United States) Lori McNeil (first round)

== Draw ==
Key

- Q = Qualifier
- WC = Wild card
- LL = Lucky loser
- Alt = Alternate
- ITF = ITF entry
- PR = Protected ranking
- SR = Special ranking
- SE = Special exempt
- JE = Junior exempt
- JR = Junior Accelerator Programme entrant
- CO = College Accelerator Programme entrant
- NG = Next Gen Accelerator Program entrant
- w/o = Walkover
- r = Retired
- d = Defaulted

=== Finals ===
Quarterfinals
1	(United States) Lisa Raymond (Australia) Rennae Stubbs	7	6^{6}	6
(France) Sandrine Testud (Italy) Roberta Vinci	5	7^{8}	4
16	(Federal Republic of Yugoslavia) Jelena Dokic (Spain) Conchita Martínez	6	6
8	(United States) Nicole Arendt (Netherlands) Caroline Vis	3	4
(Belgium) Justine Henin (Ukraine) Elena Tatarkova	3	7	11
4	(United States) Kimberly Po-Messerli (France) Nathalie Tauziat	6	5	9
10	(Germany) Anke Huber (Austria) Barbara Schett	6	2	3
2	(Spain) Virginia Ruano Pascual (Argentina) Paola Suárez	3	6	6

Semifinals
1	(United States) Lisa Raymond (Australia) Rennae Stubbs	5	2
16	(Federal Republic of Yugoslavia) Jelena Dokic (Spain) Conchita Martínez	7	6
(Belgium) Justine Henin (Ukraine) Elena Tatarkova	2	0
2	(Spain) Virginia Ruano Pascual (Argentina) Paola Suárez	6	6

Final
16	(Federal Republic of Yugoslavia) Jelena Dokic (Spain) Conchita Martínez	2	1
2	(Spain) Virginia Ruano Pascual (Argentina) Paola Suárez	6	6

=== Top half ===
==== Section 1 ====
First round
1	(United States) L Raymond (Australia) R Stubbs	6	6
(France) C Dhenin (Switzerland) E Gagliardi	4	1
(Hungary) P Mandula (Austria) P Wartusch	7^{9}	6
(France) A Cocheteux (France) S Foretz	6^{7}	3
(Romania) R Dragomir Ilie (Italy) S Farina Elia	6	6
WC	(France) L Ghirardi (France) C Pin	2	0
(Russia) A Jidkova (United States) M Tu	4	6	3
15	(Australia) N Pratt (Argentina) P Tarabini	6	3	6
11	(Italy) T Garbin (Slovakia) J Husárová	6	5	1
(France) S Testud (Italy) R Vinci	0	7	6
(Croatia) I Majoli (France) V Razzano	4	5
(Slovakia) K Habšudová (Canada) S Jeyaseelan	6	7
(Kazakhstan) I Selyutina (Uzbekistan) I Tulyaganova	4	2
(Spain) E Bes (Belarus) T Poutchek	6	6
(Australia) R McQuillan (Australia) L McShea	2	6	1
6	(Belgium) E Callens (United States) M Shaughnessy	6	4	6

Second round
1	(United States) L Raymond (Australia) R Stubbs	6	6
(Hungary) P Mandula (Austria) P Wartusch	3	3
(Romania) R Dragomir Ilie (Italy) S Farina Elia	4	2
15	(Australia) N Pratt (Argentina) P Tarabini	6	6
(France) S Testud (Italy) R Vinci	6	6
(Slovakia) K Habšudová (Canada) S Jeyaseelan	3	3
(Spain) E Bes (Belarus) T Poutchek	7	1	3
6	(Belgium) E Callens (United States) M Shaughnessy	5	6	6

Third round
1	(United States) L Raymond (Australia) R Stubbs	6	6
15	(Australia) N Pratt (Argentina) P Tarabini	3	3
(France) S Testud (Italy) R Vinci	6	1	6
6	(Belgium) E Callens (United States) M Shaughnessy	3	6	3

Quarterfinals
1	(United States) L Raymond (Australia) R Stubbs	7	6^{6}	6
(France) S Testud (Italy) R Vinci	5	7^{8}	4

==== Section 2 ====
First round
3	(Zimbabwe) C Black (Russia) E Likhovtseva	6	3	6
(Spain) A Ortuño (Venezuela) M Vento	4	6	3
(Japan) N Miyagi (India) N Vaidyanathan	3	5
(Germany) K Freye (Australia) T Musgrave	6	7
(France) N Dechy (Russia) N Petrova	6	7^{7}
Alt	(United States) D Buth (Spain) C Martínez Granados	3	6^{3}
(Australia) A Molik (United States) L Osterloh	4	1
16	(Federal Republic of Yugoslavia) J Dokic (Spain) C Martínez	6	6
9	(United States) M Navratilova (Spain) A Sánchez Vicario	6	3	5
(Czech Republic) K Hrdličková (Germany) B Rittner	2	6	7
(Germany) A Glass (Slovenia) T Pisnik	1	6	0
(United States) A Frazier (United States) K Schlukebir	6	1	6
(Austria) S Plischke (Canada) V Webb	7	6
(Spain) M Serna (United States) A Stevenson	5	4
(Japan) R Hiraki (Hungary) K Marosi-Aracama	2	2
8	(United States) N Arendt (Netherlands) C Vis	6	6

Second round
3	(Zimbabwe) C Black (Russia) E Likhovtseva	6	6
(Germany) K Freye (Australia) T Musgrave	1	4
(France) N Dechy (Russia) N Petrova	2	6	2
16	(Federal Republic of Yugoslavia) J Dokic (Spain) C Martínez	6	1	6
(Czech Republic) K Hrdličková (Germany) B Rittner	7	6
(United States) A Frazier (United States) K Schlukebir	5	3
(Austria) S Plischke (Canada) V Webb	1	2
8	(United States) N Arendt (Netherlands) C Vis	6	6

Third round
3	(Zimbabwe) C Black (Russia) E Likhovtseva	6	1	1
16	(Federal Republic of Yugoslavia) J Dokic (Spain) C Martínez	4	6	6
(Czech Republic) K Hrdličková (Germany) B Rittner
8	(United States) N Arendt (Netherlands) C Vis	w/o

Quarterfinals
16	(Federal Republic of Yugoslavia) J Dokic (Spain) C Martínez	6	6
8	(United States) N Arendt (Netherlands) C Vis	3	4

=== Bottom half ===
==== Section 3 ====
First round
7	(France) A Fusai (Italy) R Grande	6	6
(Slovenia) M Matevžič (Germany) C Schneider	4	4
(Belgium) J Henin (Ukraine) E Tatarkova	6^{5}	6	6
(South Africa) K Grant (Germany) M Weingärtner	7^{7}	2	3
(Belgium) K Clijsters (Belgium) L Courtois	6	6
WC	(France) C Bornu (France) S Georges	3	2
(Netherlands) K Boogert (Netherlands) M Oremans	3	6	4
12	(South Africa) L Huber (Argentina) L Montalvo	6	4	6
14	(United States) J Capriati (Japan) A Sugiyama	6	6
(Argentina) M Díaz Oliva (Slovenia) P Rampre	4	2
(Sweden) Å Carlsson (Bulgaria) M Maleeva	2	6	6
(Spain) MJ Martínez Sánchez (Spain) A Medina Garrigues	6	3	3
(Germany) B Lamade (Switzerland) P Schnyder	6	4	6
(Italy) G Casoni (Federal Republic of Yugoslavia) S Načuk	1	6	2
(Czech Republic) E Martincová (Netherlands) S Noorlander	2	2
4	(United States) K Po-Messerli (France) N Tauziat	6	6

Second round
7	(France) A Fusai (Italy) R Grande	6^{6}	5
(Belgium) J Henin (Ukraine) E Tatarkova	7^{8}	7
(Belgium) K Clijsters (Belgium) L Courtois	6	6
12	(South Africa) L Huber (Argentina) L Montalvo	4	2
14	(United States) J Capriati (Japan) A Sugiyama	5	6	6
(Sweden) Å Carlsson (Bulgaria) M Maleeva	7	4	4
(Germany) B Lamade (Switzerland) P Schnyder	6^{5}	7	3
4	(United States) K Po-Messerli (France) N Tauziat	7^{7}	5	6

Third round
(Belgium) J Henin (Ukraine) E Tatarkova	6	6
(Belgium) K Clijsters (Belgium) L Courtois	4	0
14	(United States) J Capriati (Japan) A Sugiyama	6^{4}	7^{7}	4
4	(United States) K Po-Messerli (France) N Tauziat	7^{7}	6^{5}	6

Quarterfinals
(Belgium) J Henin (Ukraine) E Tatarkova	3	7	11
4	(United States) K Po-Messerli (France) N Tauziat	6	5	9

==== Section 4 ====
First round
17	(South Africa) A Coetzer (United States) L McNeil	3	5
(Slovakia) D Hantuchová (Slovakia) H Nagyová	6	7
WC	(France) A-L Heitz (France) É Le Bescond	2	6	6
(Australia) E Dominikovic (Canada) R Kolbovic	6	4	4
(France) É Loit (France) AG Sidot	6	4	6
(Germany) A Bachmann (Denmark) E Dyrberg	0	6	2
(Japan) S Asagoe (Japan) Y Yoshida	6^{3}	7^{7}	1
10	(Germany) A Huber (Austria) B Schett	7^{7}	6^{4}	6
13	(Slovenia) T Križan (Slovenia) K Srebotnik	3	3
(Chinese Taipei) J Lee (Indonesia) W Prakusya	6	6
(United States) E deLone (Argentina) ME Salerni	4	6^{4}
(South Africa) N de Villiers (Australia) A Ellwood	6	7^{7}
WC	(France) K Jagieniak (France) S Pitkowski	6^{3}	4
(United Kingdom) J Pullin (United Kingdom) L Woodroffe	7^{7}	6
(Bulgaria) L Bacheva (Spain) C Torrens Valero	6^{2}	3
2	(Spain) V Ruano Pascual (Argentina) P Suárez	7^{7}	6

Second round
(Slovakia) D Hantuchová (Slovakia) H Nagyová	7^{7}	6
WC	(France) A-L Heitz (France) É Le Bescond	6^{3}	1
(France) É Loit (France) AG Sidot	0	5
10	(Germany) A Huber (Austria) B Schett	6	7
(Chinese Taipei) J Lee (Indonesia) W Prakusya	6	2	2
(South Africa) N de Villiers (Australia) A Ellwood	3	6	6
(United Kingdom) J Pullin (United Kingdom) L Woodroffe	1	2
2	(Spain) V Ruano Pascual (Argentina) P Suárez	6	6

Third round
(Slovakia) D Hantuchová (Slovakia) H Nagyová	4	4
10	(Germany) A Huber (Austria) B Schett	6	6
(South Africa) N de Villiers (Australia) A Ellwood	3	3
2	(Spain) V Ruano Pascual (Argentina) P Suárez	6	6

Quarterfinals
10	(Germany) A Huber (Austria) B Schett	6	2	3
2	(Spain) V Ruano Pascual (Argentina) P Suárez	3	6	6
