= 2001 French Open – Women's singles =

Women's singles
- 2001 French Open

Final
- Champion: (United States) Jennifer Capriati
- Runner-up: (Belgium) Kim Clijsters
- Score: 1–6, 6–4, 12–10
- Date: 9 June 2001

Details
- Seeds: 16

Events
Singles	men	women		boys	girls
Doubles	men	women	mixed	boys	girls
WC Singles	men	women	quad
WC Doubles	men	women	quad
Legends	−45	45+	women
- French Open

Jennifer Capriati defeated Kim Clijsters in the final, 1–6, 6–4, 12–10 to win the women's singles tennis title at the 2001 French Open. It was her first French Open title and second major title overall. Clijsters was the first Belgian woman to reach a major singles final, having won an all-Belgian semifinal against Justine Henin for the honor.

Mary Pierce was the reigning champion, but did not compete due to a back injury.

This marked the first major appearance of future Wimbledon champion Marion Bartoli. It also marked the French Open debut of future champion Francesca Schiavone, who reached the quarterfinals, her best result at the tournament until her title run nine years later.

This was the last major to feature only 16 seeds.

== Seeds ==
The seeded players are listed below. Jennifer Capriati is the champion; others show the round in which they were eliminated.

1. (Switzerland) Martina Hingis (semifinals)
2. (United States) Venus Williams (first round)
3. (United States) Lindsay Davenport (withdrew due to knee injury)
4. (United States) Jennifer Capriati (champion)
5. (France) Amélie Mauresmo (first round)
6. (United States) Serena Williams (quarterfinals)
7. (Russia) Elena Dementieva (second round)
8. (Spain) Conchita Martínez (third round)
9. (France) Nathalie Tauziat (first round)
10. (South Africa) Amanda Coetzer (third round)
11. (Spain) Arantxa Sánchez Vicario (second round)
12. (Belgium) Kim Clijsters (final)
13. (Bulgaria) Magdalena Maleeva (first round)
14. (Belgium) Justine Henin (semifinals)
15. (Federal Republic of Yugoslavia) Jelena Dokić (third round)
16. (United States) Meghann Shaughnessy (fourth round)
17. (France) Sandrine Testud (fourth round)

== Draw ==
Key

- Q = Qualifier
- WC = Wild card
- LL = Lucky loser
- Alt = Alternate
- ITF = ITF entry
- PR = Protected ranking
- SR = Special ranking
- SE = Special exempt
- JE = Junior exempt
- JR = Junior Accelerator Programme entrant
- CO = College Accelerator Programme entrant
- NG = Next Gen Accelerator Program entrant
- w/o = Walkover
- r = Retired
- d = Defaulted

=== Finals ===
Quarterfinals
1	(Switzerland) Martina Hingis	6	6
(Italy) Francesca Schiavone	1	4
4	(United States) Jennifer Capriati	6	5	6
6	(United States) Serena Williams	2	7	2
12	(Belgium) Kim Clijsters	6	6
Q	(Hungary) Petra Mandula	1	3
(Russia) Lina Krasnoroutskaya	1	2
14	(Belgium) Justine Henin	6	6

Semifinals
1	(Switzerland) Martina Hingis	4	3
4	(United States) Jennifer Capriati	6	6
12	(Belgium) Kim Clijsters	2	7	6
14	(Belgium) Justine Henin	6	5	3

Finals
4	(United States) Jennifer Capriati	1	6	12
12	(Belgium) Kim Clijsters	6	4	10

=== Top half ===
==== Section 1 ====
First round
1	(Switzerland) M Hingis	6	6
(Spain) G León García	1	0
(Colombia) C Castaño	6	6
WC	(France) M Bartoli	4	3
LL	(Indonesia) W Prakusya	6	1	1
(Australia) R McQuillan	3	6	6
(United States) J Craybas	4	6	7
(Czech Republic) S Kleinová	6	1	5
Q	(Slovakia) M Suchá	6	6
(Russia) A Myskina	2	4
(Russia) E Bovina	6	6
(Canada) J Nejedly	0	4
(Belarus) T Poutchek	1	6	6
(Australia) E Dominikovic	6	2	3
(United States) D Buth	1	1
17	(France) S Testud	6	6

Second round
1	(Switzerland) M Hingis	6	6
(Colombia) C Castaño	1	0
(Australia) R McQuillan	4	6	10
(United States) J Craybas	6	1	8
Q	(Slovakia) M Suchá	3	6	2
(Russia) E Bovina	6	2	6
(Belarus) T Poutchek	4	0
17	(France) S Testud	6	6

Third round
1	(Switzerland) M Hingis	7	6
(Australia) R McQuillan	5	1
(Russia) E Bovina	3	6^{3}
17	(France) S Testud	6	7^{7}

Fourth round
1	(Switzerland) M Hingis	6	2	6
17	(France) S Testud	1	6	2

==== Section 2 ====
First round
10	(South Africa) A Coetzer	6	6
(Germany) B Lamade	4	2
(Spain) V Ruano Pascual	6	6
(United States) J Hopkins	1	1
(United States) S Cacic	1	0
(Spain) Á Montolio	6	6
(Switzerland) M Vavrinec	4	5
(Italy) F Schiavone	6	7
(United States) A Bradshaw	0	3
(Switzerland) P Schnyder	6	6
(Netherlands) K Boogert	2	0
(Zimbabwe) C Black	6	6
(United States) A Stevenson	3	3
(Slovakia) D Hantuchová	6	6
(France) A-G Sidot	1	1
8	(Spain) C Martínez	6	6

Second round
10	(South Africa) A Coetzer	6	7
(Spain) V Ruano Pascual	4	5
(Spain) Á Montolio	4	1
(Italy) F Schiavone	6	6
(Switzerland) P Schnyder	2	5
(Zimbabwe) C Black	6	7
(Slovakia) D Hantuchová	6^{4}	4
8	(Spain) C Martínez	7^{7}	6

Third round
10	(South Africa) A Coetzer	5	4
(Italy) F Schiavone	7	6
(Zimbabwe) C Black	3	6	6
8	(Spain) C Martínez	6	3	4

Fourth round
(Italy) F Schiavone	7^{7}	6
(Zimbabwe) C Black	6^{2}	1

==== Section 3 ====
First round
4	(United States) J Capriati	6	7
(France) É Loit	2	5
Q	(Spain) C Martínez Granados	3	1
(Italy) T Garbin	6	6
(Germany) M Weingärtner	6	1	1
Q	(Croatia) M Lučić	3	6	6
(New Zealand) P Nola	1	4
Q	(Spain) E Bes	6	6
(Venezuela) M-A Vento	5	0
WC	(France) L Andretto	7	6
(Slovakia) J Husárová	6	6
(Slovakia) Ľ Cervanová	2	4
(United States) M Tu	6	6
WC	(France) A Fusai	3	3
(Slovenia) T Pisnik	3	1
16	(United States) M Shaughnessy	6	6

Second round
4	(United States) J Capriati	6	6
(Italy) T Garbin	2	1
Q	(Croatia) M Lučić	6	6
Q	(Spain) E Bes	1	3
WC	(France) L Andretto	2	2
(Slovakia) J Husárová	6	6
(United States) M Tu	6	1	1
16	(United States) M Shaughnessy	3	6	6

Third round
4	(United States) J Capriati	6	6
Q	(Croatia) M Lučić	3	1
(Slovakia) J Husárová	5	4
16	(United States) M Shaughnessy	7	6

Fourth round
4	(United States) J Capriati	7	6
16	(United States) M Shaughnessy	5	1

==== Section 4 ====
First round
11	(Spain) A Sánchez Vicario	4	6	6
Q	(Germany) G Arn	6	2	1
(United States) A Frazier	6	6
Q	(Italy) A Serra Zanetti	2	0
(Russia) N Petrova	6	7
(Slovakia) K Habšudová	3	5
(Uzbekistan) I Tulyaganova	3	5
(Spain) M Serna	6	7
Q	(Slovenia) M Matevžič	2	3
(Germany) B Rittner	6	6
Q	(Hungary) Z Gubacsi	4	7	7
(Thailand) T Tanasugarn	6	5	5
Q	(Slovenia) K Srebotnik	7^{7}	6
(Italy) G Casoni	6^{2}	3
(France) S Pitkowski	2	7^{7}	1
6	(United States) S Williams	6	6^{4}	6

Second round
11	(Spain) A Sánchez Vicario	6	3	4
(United States) A Frazier	1	6	6
(Russia) N Petrova	6	6
(Spain) M Serna	2	2
(Germany) B Rittner	6	5	4
Q	(Hungary) Z Gubacsi	0	7	6
Q	(Slovenia) K Srebotnik	0	5
6	(United States) S Williams	6	7

Third round
(United States) A Frazier	7^{7}	4	3
(Russia) N Petrova	6^{2}	6	6
Q	(Hungary) Z Gubacsi	1	2
6	(United States) S Williams	6	6

Fourth round
(Russia) N Petrova	3	1
6	(United States) S Williams	6	6

=== Bottom half ===
==== Section 5 ====
First round
7	(Russia) E Dementieva	6	6
WC	(France) C Beigbeder	4	1
(Slovakia) H Nagyová	6	6
(Israel) A Smashnova	4	4
(France) N Dechy	5	6	6
WC	(Australia) A Molik	7	4	4
(United States) L Osterloh	6	2	8
(South Africa) J Kruger	2	6	10
(Czech Republic) K Hrdličková	4	4
(Tunisia) S Sfar	6	6
(Romania) R Dragomir-Ilie	3	6	2
(Spain) M Marrero	6	4	6
(Bulgaria) L Bacheva	5	4
(Argentina) M Díaz Oliva	7	6
Q	(Argentina) ME Salerni	3	4
12	(Belgium) K Clijsters	6	6

Second round
7	(Russia) E Dementieva	5	5
(Slovakia) H Nagyová	7	7
(France) N Dechy	6	6
(South Africa) J Kruger	3	2
(Tunisia) S Sfar	3	7	4
(Spain) M Marrero	6	5	6
(Argentina) M Díaz Oliva	5	1
12	(Belgium) K Clijsters	7	6

Third round
(Slovakia) H Nagyová	7	4	6
(France) N Dechy	5	6	3
(Spain) M Marrero	2	2
12	(Belgium) K Clijsters	6	6

Fourth round
(Slovakia) H Nagyová	4	6	3
12	(Belgium) K Clijsters	6	4	6

==== Section 6 ====
First round
15	(Federal Republic of Yugoslavia) J Dokić	6	6
(Czech Republic) A Gerši	0	0
(United States) M Irvin	5	7^{7}	6
(Netherlands) A Hopmans	7	6^{5}	2
Q	(Hungary) P Mandula	4	6	6
(Japan) A Sugiyama	6	4	3
(Paraguay) R de los Ríos	6	1	6
(Russia) E Likhovtseva	2	6	1
(Australia) N Pratt	6	7
WC	(France) K Jagieniak	3	5
(Spain) C Torrens Valero	6^{4}	7	6
(Spain) A Medina Garrigues	7^{7}	5	3
(Croatia) I Majoli	6	4	2
(Italy) R Grande	1	6	6
(Germany) J Kandarr	7	7
5	(France) A Mauresmo	5	5

Second round
15	(Federal Republic of Yugoslavia) J Dokić	6	6
(United States) M Irvin	1	2
Q	(Hungary) P Mandula	7	5	7
(Paraguay) R de los Ríos	5	7	5
(Australia) N Pratt	4	2
(Spain) C Torrens Valero	6	6
(Italy) R Grande	6	6
(Germany) J Kandarr	2	4

Third round
15	(Federal Republic of Yugoslavia) J Dokić	6	4	4
Q	(Hungary) P Mandula	3	6	6
(Spain) C Torrens Valero	3	1
(Italy) R Grande	6	6

Fourth round
Q	(Hungary) P Mandula	6	6
(Italy) R Grande	2	3

==== Section 7 ====
First round
9	(France) N Tauziat	1	3
(Russia) L Krasnoroutskaya	6	6
(Hungary) R Kuti-Kis	6	2	2
Q	(Czech Republic) L Němečková	3	6	6
(Luxembourg) A Kremer	6	6
(Switzerland) E Gagliardi	0	4
(Czech Republic) D Chládková	6	6
(Netherlands) M Oremans	2	3
(Germany) A Glass	4	6	6
(United States) L Raymond	6	4	1
(Czech Republic) D Bedáňová	7	7
WC	(France) S Foretz	5	5
(Spain) M Sánchez Lorenzo	1	1
(Russia) T Panova	6	6
(Italy) S Farina Elia	6	5	6
13	(Bulgaria) M Maleeva	1	7	3

Second round
(Russia) L Krasnoroutskaya	6	6
Q	(Czech Republic) L Němečková	4	3
(Luxembourg) A Kremer	6	2	3
(Czech Republic) D Chládková	4	6	6
(Germany) A Glass	6	5	0
(Czech Republic) D Bedáňová	4	7	6
(Russia) T Panova	6	3	3
(Italy) S Farina Elia	4	6	6

Third round
(Russia) L Krasnoroutskaya	6	2	6
(Czech Republic) D Chládková	1	6	1
(Czech Republic) D Bedáňová	5	6^{4}
(Italy) S Farina Elia	7	7^{7}

Fourth round
(Russia) L Krasnoroutskaya	6	6
(Italy) S Farina Elia	2	4

==== Section 8 ====
First round
14	(Belgium) J Henin	6	6
(Japan) S Asagoe	3	2
(Spain) MJ Martínez Sánchez	5	6^{6}
(Argentina) P Suárez	7	7^{8}
(Canada) S Jeyaseelan	2	1
(Germany) A Huber	6	6
(France) V Razzano	6	6
WC	(France) C Pin	1	2
(Spain) N Llagostera	6	7
(Croatia) S Talaja	1	5
LL	(Germany) A Barna	5	3
(Austria) S Plischke	7	6
(Sweden) Å Carlsson	6	6
(United States) K Brandi	1	2
(Austria) B Schett	6	6
2	(United States) V Williams	4	4

Second round
14	(Belgium) J Henin	6	6
(Argentina) P Suárez	3	4
(Germany) A Huber	0	6	1
(France) V Razzano	6	4	6
(Spain) N Llagostera	5	6	8
(Austria) S Plischke	7	0	6
(Sweden) Å Carlsson	3	6	2
(Austria) B Schett	6	4	6

Third round
14	(Belgium) J Henin	6	6
(France) V Razzano	3	4
(Spain) N Llagostera	0	6	2
(Austria) B Schett	6	4	6

Fourth round
14	(Belgium) J Henin	6	6
(Austria) B Schett	3	4

Preceded by 2001 Australian Open – Women's singles	Grand Slam women's singles	Succeeded by 2001 Wimbledon Championships – Women's singles
