= Magdalena Kučerová =

German tennis player

- Country (sports): Germany
- Born: 6 October 1976 (age 48); Prague, Czechoslovakia
- Retired: 2008
- Plays: Right-handed
- Prize money: $57,737

Singles
- Career record: 153–137
- Career titles: 1 ITF
- Highest ranking: No. 226 (31 July 2000)

Grand Slam singles results
- US Open: Q1 (2000)

Doubles
- Career record: 94–88
- Career titles: 8 ITF
- Highest ranking: No. 157 (18 March 2002)

Magdalena Kučerová (born 6 October 1976) is a former German tennis player of Czech descent.

Kučerová, who won one singles title and eight doubles tournaments on the ITF Women's Circuit in her career, reached a doubles ranking high of world No. 157 in March 2002.

== ITF finals ==
Legend
$25,000 tournaments
$10,000 tournaments

=== Singles (1–2) ===
Result	No.	Date	Tournament	Surface	Opponent	Score
Win	1.	30 August 1998	Milan, Italy	Clay	(Croatia) Marijana Kovačević	6–2, 3–6, 6–3
Loss	1.	18 October 1998	Saint-Raphaël, France	Hard (i)	(Poland) Katarzyna Nowak	1–6, 6–7
Loss	2.	7 November 1999	Saint-Raphaël, France	Hard (i)	(France) Olivia Sanchez	1–6, 6–1, 5–7

=== Doubles (8–4) ===
Result	No.	Date	Tournament	Surface	Partner	Opponents	Score
Win	1.	22 June 1997	Tallinn, Estonia	Hard	(Germany) Gabriela Kučerová	(Hungary) Nóra Köves (Finland) Kirsi Lampinen	6–4, 6–1
Win	2.	10 August 1997	Paderborn, Germany	Clay	(Germany) Gabriela Kučerová	(Austria) Sabine Lutter (Germany) Katja Pohlmann	6–4, 6–2
Win	3.	5 October 1997	Langenthal, Switzerland	Carpet (i)	(Czech Republic) Helena Vildová	(Switzerland) Diane Asensio (Switzerland) Angela Bürgis	7–5, 6–4
Win	4.	14 December 1997	Ostrava, Czech Republic	Carpet (i)	(Germany) Gabriela Kučerová	(Czech Republic) Michaela Paštiková (Czech Republic) Libuše Průšová	6–3, 6–4
Win	5.	23 August 1998	Valašské Meziříčí, Czech Republic	Clay	(Czech Republic) Jana Pospíšilová	(Poland) Katharzyna Teodorowicz (Poland) Anna Bieleń-Żarska	6–3, 4–6, 7–6^{(7–5)}
Loss	1.	4 October 1998	Thessaloniki, Greece	Clay	(Slovakia) Ľudmila Cervanová	(Greece) Eleni Daniilidou (Greece) Christína Papadáki	6–7^{(5–7)}, 6–4, 5–7
Loss	2.	20 December 1998	Průhonice, Czech Republic	Carpet (i)	(Slovakia) Ľudmila Cervanová	(Czech Republic) Eva Melicharová (Czech Republic) Helena Vildová	6–4, 3–6, 4–6
Loss	3.	27 February 2000	Buchen, Germany	Carpet (i)	(Czech Republic) Ludmila Richterová	(Hungary) Adrienn Hegedűs (Netherlands) Maaike Koutstaal	4–6, 2–6
Win	6.	15 July 2001	Darmstadt, Germany	Clay	(Germany) Lydia Steinbach	(Czech Republic) Milena Nekvapilová (Czech Republic) Hana Šromová	6–1, 6–2
Win	7.	12 August 2001	Hechingen, Germany	Clay	(Germany) Lydia Steinbach	(Austria) Daniela Klemenschits (Austria) Sandra Klemenschits	5–7, 6–2, 6–1
Win	8.	28 October 2001	Opole, Poland	Carpet (i)	(Germany) Lydia Steinbach	(Czech Republic) Milena Nekvapilová (Czech Republic) Hana Šromová	6–3, 6–2
Loss	4.	18 August 2002	Innsbruck, Austria	Clay	(Germany) Lydia Steinbach	(Russia) Gulnara Fattakhetdinova (Russia) Maria Kondratieva	4–6, 6–4, 3–6
