= Nina Dübbers =

German tennis player

- ITF name: Nina Duebbers
- Country (sports): Germany
- Born: 24 June 1980 (age 46) Heidelberg, West Germany
- Prize money: $105,720

Singles
- Career record: 146–153
- Career titles: 2 ITF
- Highest ranking: 166 (10 June 2002)

Grand Slam singles results
- Australian Open: Q1 (2002, 2004)
- French Open: Q2 (2002, 2003)
- Wimbledon: Q2 (2002)
- US Open: 1R (2001)

Doubles
- Career record: 38–51
- Career titles: 2 ITF
- Highest ranking: 248 (2 February 2004)

Nina Dübbers (born 24 June 1980) is a former German tennis player.

Dübbers, who won two singles and two doubles ITF tournaments in her career, reached a singles ranking high of world number 166 on 10 June 2002.

She qualified for the first round of the 2001 US Open – Women's singles, but lost 3–6, 2–6 to 18th seed Sandrine Testud.

== ITF finals ==
=== Singles (2–1) ===
| Legend $100,000 tournaments $75,000 tournaments $50,000 tournaments $25,000 tournaments $10,000 tournaments | Finals by surface Hard (2–0) Clay (0–1) Grass (0–0) Carpet (0–0) |

| Outcome | No. | Date | Tournament | Surface | Opponent | Score |
|---|---|---|---|---|---|---|
| Runner-up | 1. | 22 May 2000 | Warsaw, Poland | Clay | (Czech Republic) Pavlína Šlitrová | 1–6, 4–6 |
| Winner | 1. | 23 July 2001 | Pamplona, Spain | Hard (i) | (Czech Republic) Magdalena Zděnovcová | 6–3, 3–6, 6–1 |
| Winner | 2. | 20 October 2003 | Rockhampton, Australia | Hard | (Bulgaria) Dessislava Topalova | 7–5, 6–1 |

=== Doubles (2–0) ===
| Legend $100,000 tournaments $75,000 tournaments $50,000 tournaments $25,000 tournaments $10,000 tournaments | Finals by surface Hard (1–0) Clay (0–0) Grass (0–0) Carpet (1–0) |

| Outcome | No. | Date | Tournament | Surface | Partner | Opponents | Score |
|---|---|---|---|---|---|---|---|
| Winner | 1. | 3 March 1997 | Buchen, Germany | Carpet (i) | (Germany) Lisa Fritz | (Czech Republic) Olga Blahotová (Czech Republic) Jana Macurová | 5–7, 6–3, 6–4 |
| Winner | 2. | 16 July 2001 | Valladolid, Spain | Hard | (Italy) Francesca Lubiani | (Hungary) Adrienn Hegedűs (Hungary) Eszter Molnár | 6–2, 7–6^{(7–4)} |
