= Anne-Laure Heitz =

French tennis player (born 1982)

- Full name: Anne-Laure Heitz
- Country (sports): France
- Born: 15 March 1982 (age 43)
- Plays: Right-handed
- Prize money: $85,918

Singles
- Career record: 176–172
- Career titles: 4 ITF
- Highest ranking: No. 213 (14 January 2002)

Doubles
- Career record: 41–54
- Career titles: 1 ITF
- Highest ranking: No. 219 (27 May 2002)

Grand Slam doubles results
- French Open: 2R (2001)

Anne-Laure Heitz (born 15 March 1982) is a former professional tennis player from France.

== Biography ==
A right-handed player, Heitz comes from the French city of Mulhouse, near the borders of Germany and Switzerland.

Heitz made her WTA Tour main-draw debut as a qualifier in the doubles at the 2001 Internationaux de Tennis Feminin Nice.

From 2001 to 2003, she received a wildcard into the French Open doubles draw, with her best performance a second-round appearance in 2001, partnering Élodie Le Bescond.

As a singles player, she had a ranking on tour of 213 in the world, winning four ITF titles.

She has served as coach of the Luxembourg Fed Cup team.

== ITF finals ==
$25,000 tournaments
$10,000 tournaments

=== Singles (4–6) ===
Result	No.	Date	Tournament	Surface	Opponent	Score
Loss	1.	15 August 1999	Saint-Gaudens, France	Clay	(France) Carine Bornu	6–2, 4–6, 1–6
Loss	2.	30 April 2000	Talence, France	Hard	(Morocco) Bahia Mouhtassine	6–7^{(4–7)}, 6–7^{(2–7)}
Win	3.	16 July 2000	Brussels, Belgium	Clay	(Greece) Evagelia Roussi	7–6^{(7–4)}, 6–1
Win	4.	4 February 2001	Tipton, Great Britain	Hard (i)	(Germany) Lydia Steinbach	6–4, 3–6, 7–6^{(7–2)}
Loss	5.	22 October 2001	Joué-lès-Tours, France	Hard (i)	(Hungary) Kira Nagy	6–1, 4–6, 0–6
Loss	6.	28 October 2001	Saint Raphael, France	Hard (i)	(Italy) Nathalie Viérin	6–4, 1–6, 3–6
Win	7.	2 November 2003	Stockholm, Sweden	Hard (i)	(Estonia) Margit Rüütel	3–6, 6–1, 6–4
Win	8.	23 September 2007	Limoges, France	Hard (i)	(France) Audrey Bergot	6–1, 6–1
Loss	9.	30 September 2007	Clermont-Ferrand, France	Hard (i)	(France) Karla Mraz	1–6, 5–7
Loss	10.	27 January 2008	Grenoble, France	Hard (i)	(France) Claire Feuerstein	3–6, 6–4, 4–6

=== Doubles (1–2) ===
Result	No.	Date	Tournament	Surface	Partner	Opponents	Score
Loss	1.	28 October 2001	Saint-Raphaël, France	Hard (i)	(France) Élodie Le Bescond	(France) Caroline Dhenin (New Zealand) Shelley Stephens	0–6, 5–7
Loss	2.	27 July 2002	Les Contamines, France	Hard	(France) Stéphanie Cohen-Aloro	(Russia) Maria Kondratieva (Serbia and Montenegro) Katarina Mišić	1–6, 6–7^{(4)}
Win	3.	10 August 2003	Rebecq, Belgium	Clay	(France) Amandine Singla	(Belgium) Leslie Butkiewicz (Netherlands) Kim Kilsdonk	0–6, 7–6^{(3)}, 7–5
