= Dally Randriantefy =

Malagasy tennis player

- Country (sports): Madagascar
- Residence: Antananarivo, Madagascar
- Born: 23 February 1977 (age 49) Antananarivo
- Height: 1.65 m (5 ft 5 in)
- Turned pro: 1994
- Retired: 2006
- Plays: Right (two-handed backhand)
- Prize money: $663,958

Singles
- Career record: 319–206
- Career titles: 7 ITF
- Highest ranking: No. 44 (11 April 2005)

Grand Slam singles results
- Australian Open: 3R (1995)
- French Open: 3R (2003)
- Wimbledon: 1R (1996, 2003, 2004, 2005)
- US Open: 3R (1996)

Doubles
- Career record: 41–44
- Career titles: 3 ITF
- Highest ranking: No. 193 (6 May 2002)

Dally Randriantefy (born 23 February 1977) is a former professional Malagasy female tennis player.

In her career, Randriantefy won seven singles titles and three doubles titles on the ITF Circuit. On 11 April 2005, she reached her best singles ranking of world No. 44. On 6 May 2002, she peaked at No. 193 in the doubles rankings. Her best results have been two semifinal appearances at the WTA Strasbourg tournament and the WTA Acapulco (both Tier III).

Randriantefy took part in three Olympic Games, in Barcelona (1992), Atlanta (1996) and Athens (2004). She was the flag bearer of Malagasy Olympic team in Atlanta. The Randriantefy sisters competed in women's doubles and they faced the Spanish pair of Conchita Martínez and Arantxa Sánchez Vicario in Barcelona and in Atlanta in the first rounds. As of today, only Dally and Natacha Randriantefy represented Madasgascar in tennis at Olympic Games leaving everlasting mark on the history of their home country and the international tennis.

She played in Madagascar Fed Cup team in 1997, her record 8-0 (6-0 in singles, 2-0 in doubles).

Randriantefy is the best ranked Austronesian, of the Indian Ocean Area player in the Open era.

She retired from professional tennis after a first-round loss at the 2006 Australian Open against Akgul Amanmuradova.

== Personal ==
Born in Antananarivo, Randriantefy was coached by father, Max; mother Olga is a language professor. Her sister Natacha is also a tennis player.

== ITF Circuit finals ==
=== Singles: 15 (7–8) ===
Legend $75,000 tournaments $50,000 tournaments $25,000 tournaments $10,000 tournaments	Finals by surface Hard (2–3) Clay (5–4) Carpet (0–1)

Result	Date	Tier	Tournament	Surface	Opponent	Score
Win	20 September 1993	10,000	Marseille, France	Clay	(France) Maïder Laval	3–6, 7–5, 6–4
Loss	21 March 1994	25,000	Brest, France	Hard	(Belgium) Els Callens	4–6, 3–6
Loss	4 December 1995	25,000	Cergy-Pontoise, France	Hard (i)	(France) Sarah Pitkowski	7–5, 1–6, 2–6
Win	5 July 1999	10,000	Le Touquet, France	Clay	(France) Stéphanie Testard	6–3, 6–3
Loss	19 June 2000	25,000	Gorizia, Italy	Clay	(Spain) Mariam Ramon Climent	2–6, 1–6
Loss	3 July 2000	25,000	Mont-de-Marsan, France	Clay	(France) Stéphanie Foretz	2–6, 3–6
Loss	24 July 2000	25,000	Les Contamines, France	Hard	(Germany) Bianka Lamade	2–6, 1–6
Win	16 October 2000	25,000	Joué-lès-Tours, France	Hard (i)	(Germany) Lydia Steinbach	4–0, 4–1, 4–1
Win	28 May 2001	25,000	Biella, Italy	Clay	(Brazil) Joana Cortez	6–1, 6–1
Win	2 September 2002	50,000	Denain, France	Clay	(Russia) Maria Goloviznina	6–2, 3–6, 6–2
Win	9 September 2002	75,000	Bordeaux, France	Clay	(Russia) Evgenia Kulikovskaya	7–5, 6–2
Win	12 October 2003	25,000	Joué-lès-Tours, France	Hard (i)	(Estonia) Kaia Kanepi	7–5, 6–4
Loss	7 September 2004	75,000	Denain, France	Clay	(Germany) Anna-Lena Grönefeld	3–6, 2–6
Loss	10 October 2004	75,000	Girona, Spain	Clay	(Spain) Marta Marrero	6–3, 6–7 ^{(6–8)}, 0–6
Loss	10 October 2004	25,000	Joué-lès-Tours, France	Carpet (i)	(Czech Republic) Květa Peschke	3–6, 2–6

=== Doubles: 5 (3–2) ===
Legend $50,000 tournaments $25,000 tournaments $10,000 tournaments	Finals by surface Hard (1–1) Clay (2–1)

Result	Date	Tier	Tournament	Surface	Partner	Opponents	Score
Loss	20 September 1993	10,000	Marseille, France	Clay	(Madagascar) Natacha Randriantefy	(Hungary) Andrea Noszály (Belgium) Daphne van de Zande	0–6, 4–6
Loss	4 December 1995	50,000	Cergy-Pontoise, France	Hard (i)	(Madagascar) Natacha Randriantefy	(United States) Angela Lettiere (United States) Corina Morariu	3–6, 5–7
Win	4 June 2001	25,000	Galatina, Italy	Clay	(Brazil) Vanessa Menga	(Morocco) Bahia Mouhtassine (Romania) Andreea Ehritt-Vanc	3–6, 6–0, 7–5
Win	15 October 2001	25,000	Joué-lès-Tours, France	Hard (i)	(Madagascar) Natacha Randriantefy	(Italy) Flavia Pennetta (Italy) Maria Paola Zavagli	6–4, 3–6, 6–3
Win	28 April 2002	50,000	Cagnes-sur-Mer, France	Clay	(France) Stéphanie Cohen-Aloro	(Czech Republic) Iveta Benešová (France) Caroline Dhenin	6–2, 6–4
