= Nathalie Viérin =

Italian tennis player

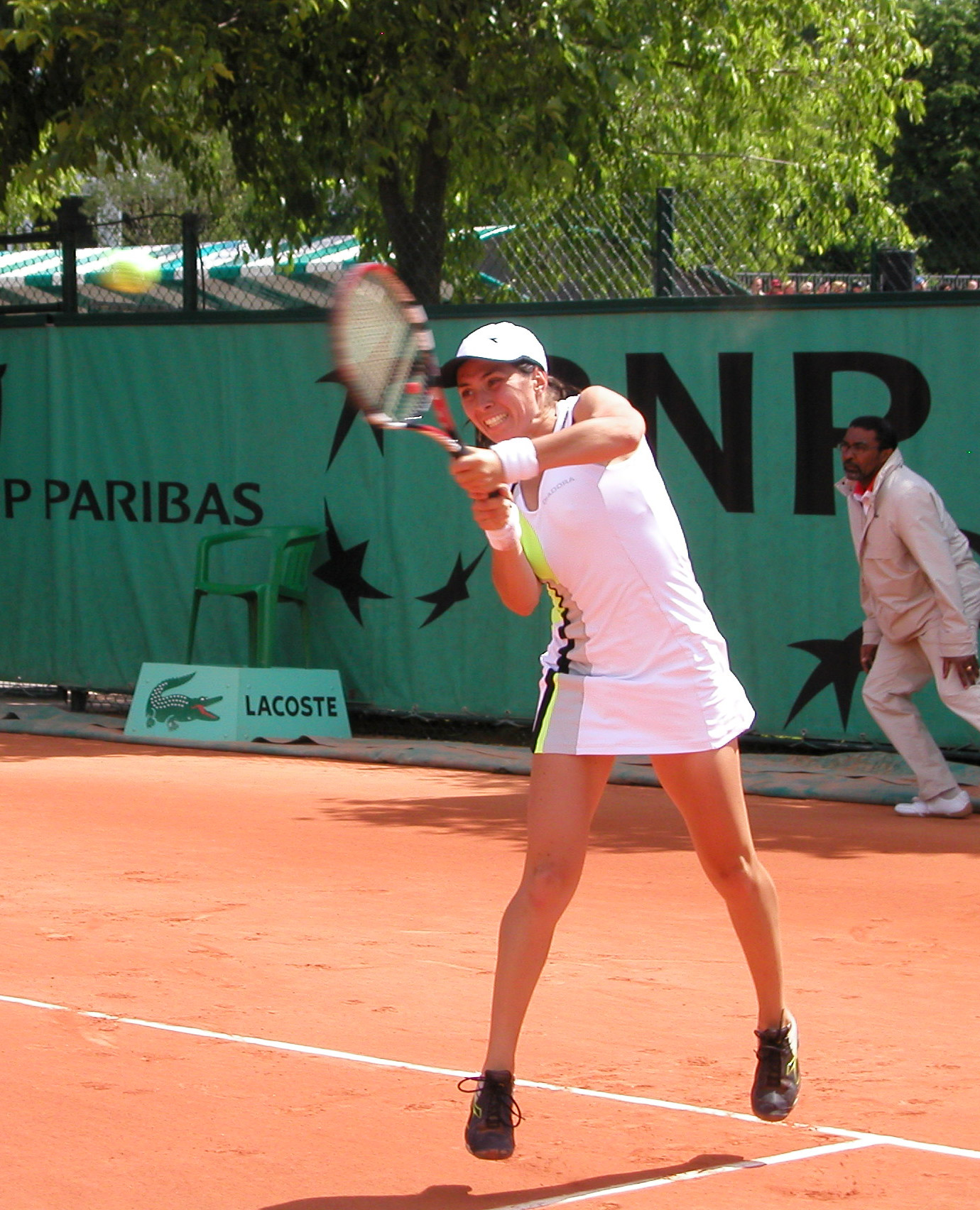
- Country (sports): Italy
- Residence: Sarre, Italy
- Born: 15 October 1982 (age 42); Aosta, Italy
- Height: 1.70 m (5 ft 7 in)
- Turned pro: July 1998
- Retired: 2010
- Plays: Right (two-handed backhand)
- Prize money: $321,276

Singles
- Career record: 310–271
- Career titles: 6 ITF
- Highest ranking: No. 103 (15 May 2006)

Grand Slam singles results
- Australian Open: Q3 (2006)
- French Open: 1R (2006)
- Wimbledon: 1R (2006)
- US Open: Q2 (2001, 2002, 2004, 2006)

Doubles
- Career record: 40–71
- Career titles: 0
- Highest ranking: No. 304 (24 September 2007)

Nathalie Viérin (born 15 October 1982) is an Italian former professional tennis player.

Her career-high singles ranking is world No. 103, which she reached on 15 May 2006. Her career-high doubles ranking is No. 304, set 24 September 2007. She has won six ITF singles titles. Nathalie Viérin retired from professional tour 2010.

She was coached by Franco Bonaiti.

== Personal life ==
Born and raised in Sarre, Aosta Valley, her parents, Angela Sirianni and Robert Viérin, run a tennis club, where she began playing when she was three. Viérin has two younger brothers, Matthieu and Julien. Baseliner who prefers clay; favorite shot is forehand. Nickname is Natha. Admires Monica Seles. Likes to visit the beach in Bol, Croatia. Favorite movie is Dirty Dancing; favorite actor is Julia Roberts; favorite book is Palomino by Danielle Steel. Says Wimbledon is the best tournament.

== ITF finals ==
$100,000 tournaments
$75,000 tournaments
$50,000 tournaments
$25,000 tournaments
$10,000 tournaments

=== Singles (6–10) ===
Result	No.	Date	Tournament	Surface	Opponent	Score
Loss	1.	28 May 2000	Biella, Italy	Clay	(Slovenia) Maja Matevžič	0–6, 2–6
Win	2.	26 November 2000	Deauville, France	Clay (i)	(France) Cecile Leclere	5–3, 2–4, 4–2, 5–4^{(2)}
Win	3.	2 April 2001	Ciudad Juárez, Mexico	Clay	(Denmark) Eva Dyrberg	6–3, 2–6, 6–3
Win	4.	21 October 2001	Saint Raphael, France	Hard (i)	(France) Anne-Laure Heitz	4–6, 6–1, 6–3
Loss	5.	22 September 2002	Luxembourg City	Clay	(Luxembourg) Claudine Schaul	2–6, 6–4, 4–6
Loss	6.	27 January 2003	Belfort, France	Hard (i)	(United Kingdom) Anne Keothavong	7–5, 6–7^{(3)}, 4–6
Loss	7.	9 June 2003	Vaduz, Liechtenstein	Clay	(Germany) Stephanie Gehrlein	3–6, 1–6
Loss	8.	20 June 2003	Les Contamines-Montjoie, France	Hard	(France) Virginie Pichet	6–4, 4–6, 3–6
Loss	9.	4 July 2004	Stuttgart, Germany	Clay	(Germany) Martina Müller	2–6, 5–7
Loss	10.	3 August 2004	Hechingen, Germany	Clay	(Czech Republic) Eva Hrdinová	4–6, 3–6
Win	11.	27 September 2004	Porto, Portugal	Clay	(Netherlands) Michelle Gerards	3–6, 7–5, 6–3
Win	12.	2 August 2005	Martina Franca, Italy	Clay	(Estonia) Maret Ani	6–3, 6–4
Win	13.	4 August 2008	Monteroni d'Arbia, Italy	Clay	(Luxembourg) Mandy Minella	6–1, 2–6, 7–6^{(5)}
Loss	14.	16 March 2009	Cairo, Egypt	Clay	(Germany) Kathrin Wörle	2–6, 4–6
Loss	15.	14 June 2009	Campobasso, Italy	Clay	(Ukraine) Irina Buryachok	4–6, 4–6
Loss	16.	21 June 2009	Padua, Italy	Clay	(Spain) Eva Fernández Brugués	2–6, 6–1, 5–7

=== Doubles (0–3) ===
Result	No.	Date	Tournament	Surface	Partner	Opponents	"Score
Loss	1.	30 November 1998	Cairo, Egypt	Clay	(Italy) Sabina Da Ponte	(Georgia (country)) Nino Louarsabishvili (Morocco) Bahia Mouhtassine	5–7, 3–6
Loss	2.	15 September 2002	Sofia, Bulgaria	Clay	(Italy) Laura Dell'Angelo	(Russia) Vera Dushevina (Kazakhstan) Galina Voskoboeva	6–3, 4–6, 2–6
Loss	3.	10 September 2007	Bordeaux, France	Clay	(Russia) Alisa Kleybanova	(Switzerland) Timea Bacsinszky (Germany) Sandra Klösel	6–7^{(2)}, 4–6
