= 2002 Internazionali Femminili di Palermo – Doubles =

Doubles
- 2002 Internazionali Femminili di Palermo

Final
- Champions: (Russia) Evgenia Kulikovskaya (Russia) Ekaterina Sysoeva
- Runners-up: (Bulgaria) Lubomira Bacheva (Germany) Angelika Rösch
- Score: 6–4, 6–3

Details
- Draw: 16
- Seeds: 4

Events
Singles	Doubles
← 2001 ·	Internazionali Femminili di Palermo	· 2003 →

Tathiana Garbin and Janette Husárová were the defending champions, but none competed this year. Garbin opted to play at Brussels in the same week.

Evgenia Kulikovskaya and Ekaterina Sysoeva won the title by defeating Lubomira Bacheva and Angelika Rösch 6–4, 6–3 in the final.

== Seeds ==
1. (Argentina) Laura Montalvo / (Argentina) Paola Suárez (semifinals)
2. (Slovakia) Henrieta Nagyová / (Sweden) Åsa Svensson (first round)
3. (Ukraine) Tatiana Perebiynis / (Australia) Christina Wheeler (first round)
4. (Bulgaria) Lubomira Bacheva / (Germany) Angelika Rösch (final)

== Draw ==
=== Key ===
- Q = Qualifier
- WC = Wild card
- LL = Lucky loser
- Alt = Alternate
- ITF = ITF entry
- PR = Protected ranking
- SR = Special ranking
- SE = Special exempt
- JE = Junior exempt
- JR = Junior Accelerator Programme entrant
- CO = College Accelerator Programme entrant
- NG = Next Gen Accelerator Program entrant
- w/o = Walkover
- r = Retired
- d = Defaulted

=== Draw ===
First round
1	(Argentina) L Montalvo (Argentina) P Suárez	6	6
(Germany) G Arn (South Africa) N Grandin	1	3
(Italy) F Pennetta (Romania) A Vanc	6	6
(Hungary) E Molnár (Croatia) M Palaveršić	2	2
3	(Ukraine) T Perebiynis (Australia) C Wheeler	3	1
(Argentina) J Cravero (Argentina) M Díaz Oliva	6	6
(Russia) E Kulikovskaya (Russia) E Sysoeva	6	6
(Belarus) N Ostrovskaya (Russia) V Zvonareva	3	4
(Ukraine) Y Beygelzimer (Russia) M Golviznina	6	1	6
(Germany) M Buric (Russia) G Fokina	1	6	1
Q	(Czech Republic) I Benešová (Czech Republic) P Cetkovská	2	2
4	(Bulgaria) L Bacheva (Germany) A Rösch	6	6
WC	(Italy) G Mortello (Italy) E Stellato	2	5
(Italy) G Pizzichini (Italy) An Serra Zanetti	6	7
(Germany) N Dübbers (Germany) B Lamade	7^{8}	6
2	(Slovakia) H Nagyová (Sweden) Å Svensson	6^{6}	3

Quarterfinals
1	(Argentina) L Montalvo (Argentina) P Suárez	6	6
(Italy) F Pennetta (Romania) A Vanc	3	1
(Argentina) J Cravero (Argentina) M Díaz Oliva
(Russia) E Kulikovskaya (Russia) E Sysoeva	w/o
(Ukraine) Y Beygelzimer (Russia) M Golviznina	1	5
4	(Bulgaria) L Bacheva (Germany) A Rösch	6	7
(Italy) G Pizzichini (Italy) An Serra Zanetti	3	4
(Germany) N Dübbers (Germany) B Lamade	6	6

Semifinals
1	(Argentina) L Montalvo (Argentina) P Suárez	6	3	0
(Russia) E Kulikovskaya (Russia) E Sysoeva	3	6	6
4	(Bulgaria) L Bacheva (Germany) A Rösch	6	7^{8}
(Germany) N Dübbers (Germany) B Lamade	4	6^{6}

Final
(Russia) E Kulikovskaya (Russia) E Sysoeva	6	6
4	(Bulgaria) L Bacheva (Germany) A Rösch	4	3
