= 2000 Internazionali Femminili di Palermo – Singles =

Singles
- 2000 Internazionali Femminili di Palermo

Final
- Champions: (Slovakia) Henrieta Nagyová
- Runners-up: (Bulgaria) Pavlina Nola
- Score: 6–3, 7–5

Details
- Draw: 32 (2WC/4Q/1LL)
- Seeds: 8

Events
Singles	Doubles
← 1999 ·	Palermo Ladies Open	· 2001 →

Anastasia Myskina was the defending champion, but lost in first round to Justine Henin.

Henrieta Nagyová won the title by defeating Pavlina Nola 6–3, 7–5 in the final.

== Seeds ==
1. (Croatia) Silvija Talaja (first round, retired)
2. (Romania) Ruxandra Dragomir (second round)
3. (Russia) Anastasia Myskina (first round)
4. (Italy) Tathiana Garbin (first round)
5. (Italy) Silvia Farina (semifinals)
6. (Israel) Anna Smashnova (semifinals)
7. (Italy) Rita Grande (first round)
8. (Spain) Marta Marrero (first round)

== Draw ==
=== Key ===
- Q = Qualifier
- WC = Wild card
- LL = Lucky loser
- Alt = Alternate
- SE = Special exempt
- PR = Protected ranking
- ITF = ITF entry
- JE = Junior exempt
- w/o = Walkover
- r = Retired
- d = Defaulted
- SR = Special ranking

=== Finals ===
Semifinals
5	(Italy) Silvia Farina	2	4
(Slovakia) Henrieta Nagyová	6	6
(Bulgaria) Pavlina Nola	6	6
6	(Israel) Anna Smashnova	1	3

Final
(Slovakia) Henrieta Nagyová	6	7
(Bulgaria) Pavlina Nola	3	5

=== Top half ===
First round
1	(Croatia) S Talaja	1	0^{r}
(Argentina) M Díaz Oliva	6	3
(Netherlands) S Noorlander	1	3
(Netherlands) A Hopmans	6	6
(Slovenia) K Srebotnik	2	1
(Switzerland) E Gagliardi	6	6
(Italy) G Casoni	0	1
5	(Italy) S Farina	6	6
3	(Russia) A Myskina	5	2
(Belgium) J Henin	7	6
WC	(Italy) F Lubiani	6	6
(Germany) M Weingärtner	2	0
(Spain) N Llagostera Vives	6	6
Q	(Uzbekistan) I Tulyaganova	2	4
(Slovakia) H Nagyová	6	6
7	(Italy) R Grande	2	4

Second round
(Argentina) M Díaz Oliva	6	6
(Netherlands) A Hopmans	2	2
(Switzerland) E Gagliardi	6	4	4
5	(Italy) S Farina	3	6	6
(Belgium) J Henin	6	6
WC	(Italy) F Lubiani	2	0
(Spain) N Llagostera Vives	3	6	4
(Slovakia) H Nagyová	6	4	6

Quarterfinals
(Argentina) M Díaz Oliva	6	5	3
5	(Italy) S Farina	2	7	6
(Belgium) J Henin	5	4
(Slovakia) H Nagyová	7	6

Semifinals
5	(Italy) S Farina	2	4
(Slovakia) H Nagyová	6	6

=== Bottom half ===
First round
8	(Spain) M Marrero	6	1	4
Q	(Germany) B Lamade	1	6	6
Q	(Slovakia) J Husárová	6	6
LL	(Italy) G Di Natale	2	1
(Spain) V Ruano Pascual	1	2
(Belgium) L Courtois	6	6
(Bulgaria) P Nola	2	6	6
4	(Italy) T Garbin	6	1	3
6	(Israel) A Smashnova	6	6
Q	(Slovenia) T Križan	4	3
(Spain) A Medina Garrigues	6	6
(Switzerland) M Vavrinec	0	3
WC	(Italy) G Pizzichini	6	6
(Belarus) T Poutchek	2	0
(Poland) M Grzybowska	1	3
2	(Romania) R Dragomir	6	6

Second round
Q	(Germany) B Lamade	4	6	1
Q	(Slovakia) J Husárová	6	3	6
(Belgium) L Courtois	1	2
(Bulgaria) P Nola	6	6
6	(Israel) A Smashnova	4	6	6
(Spain) A Medina Garrigues	6	3	0
WC	(Italy) G Pizzichini	1	6	6
2	(Romania) R Dragomir	6	1	4

Quarterfinals
Q	(Slovakia) J Husárová	7	2	4
(Bulgaria) P Nola	5	6	6
6	(Israel) A Smashnova	6	4	6
WC	(Italy) G Pizzichini	4	6	1

Semifinals
(Bulgaria) P Nola	6	6
6	(Israel) A Smashnova	1	3

== Qualifying ==
=== Qualifying seeds ===
1. (Uzbekistan) Iroda Tulyaganova (qualified)
2. (United States) Samantha Reeves (second round)
3. (Spain) Gisela Riera (first round)
4. (Slovenia) Tina Križan (qualified)
5. (Italy) Germana Di Natale (qualifying competition, lucky loser)
6. (Italy) Alice Canepa (second round)
7. (Italy) Laura Dell'Angelo (second round)
8. (Bulgaria) Desislava Topalova (second round)

=== Qualifiers ===
1. (Uzbekistan) Iroda Tulyaganova
2. (Slovenia) Tina Križan
3. (Germany) Bianka Lamade
4. (Slovakia) Janette Husárová

=== Lucky loser ===
1. (Italy) Germana Di Natale

=== Qualifying draws ===
==== First qualifier ====
First round
1	(Uzbekistan) Iroda Tulyaganova	6	6
(Spain) Conchita Martínez Granados	1	4
(Germany) Nina Nittinger	2	2
(Romania) Oana Elena Golimbioschi	6	6
(Australia) Mireille Dittmann	2	6	3
(Italy) Adriana Serra Zanetti	6	4	6
WC	(Italy) Anna Floris	4	5
6	(Italy) Alice Canepa	6	7

Second round
1	(Uzbekistan) Iroda Tulyaganova	7	7^{7}
(Romania) Oana Elena Golimbioschi	5	6^{4}
(Italy) Adriana Serra Zanetti	6	6
6	(Italy) Alice Canepa	3	2

Qualifying competition
1	(Uzbekistan) Iroda Tulyaganova	6	6
(Italy) Adriana Serra Zanetti	4	0

==== Second qualifier ====
First round
4	(Slovenia) Tina Križan	6	7
(Germany) Syna Schreiber	2	5
WC	(Germany) Caroline Schneider	6	2	6
(Thailand) Benjamas Sangaram	1	6	1
(Italy) Valentina Sassi	6	1	0^{r}
(Italy) Maria Elena Camerin	1	6	1
WC	(Italy) Alberta Brianti	5	2^{r}
7	(Italy) Laura Dell'Angelo	7	5

Second round
4	(Slovenia) Tina Križan	6	6
WC	(Germany) Caroline Schneider	4	2
(Italy) Maria Elena Camerin	2	6	6
7	(Italy) Laura Dell'Angelo	6	1	3

Qualifying competition
4	(Slovenia) Tina Križan	6	6
(Italy) Maria Elena Camerin	3	3

==== Third qualifier ====
First round
8	(Bulgaria) Desislava Topalova	6	6
(Italy) Jasmine Angeli	2	3
(Italy) Antonella Serra Zanetti	4	1
(Germany) Bianka Lamade	6	6
(Ukraine) Tatiana Kovalchuk	5	2
WC	(Italy) Nathalie Viérin	7	6
(Russia) Evgenia Kulikovskaya	7	7^{7}
3	(Spain) Gisela Riera	5	6^{5}

Second round
8	(Bulgaria) Desislava Topalova	4	6	2
(Germany) Bianka Lamade	6	3	6
WC	(Italy) Nathalie Viérin	3	6	1
(Russia) Evgenia Kulikovskaya	6	3	6

Qualifying competition
(Germany) Bianka Lamade	6	6
(Russia) Evgenia Kulikovskaya	0	2

==== Fourth qualifier ====
First round
5	(Italy) Germana Di Natale	6	6
(Italy) Flavia Pennetta	1	0
Alt	(South Africa) Kim Grant	4	2
(Austria) Karin Kschwendt	6	6
(Spain) Rosa María Andrés Rodríguez	6	3	1
(Slovakia) Janette Husárová	3	6	6
(Morocco) Bahia Mouhtassine	5	6	5
2	(United States) Samantha Reeves	7	0	7

Second round
5	(Italy) Germana Di Natale	6	6
(Austria) Karin Kschwendt	3	2
(Slovakia) Janette Husárová	7^{7}	6
2	(United States) Samantha Reeves	6^{3}	4

Qualifying competition
5	(Italy) Germana Di Natale	4	1
(Slovakia) Janette Husárová	6	6
