= 2001 Internazionali Femminili di Palermo – Doubles =

Doubles
- 2001 Internazionali Femminili di Palermo

Final
- Champions: (Italy) Tathiana Garbin (Slovakia) Janette Husárová
- Runners-up: (Spain) María José Martínez Sánchez (Spain) Anabel Medina Garrigues
- Score: 4–6, 6–2, 6–4

Details
- Draw: 16 (1WC/1Q/1LL)
- Seeds: 4

Events
Singles	Doubles
← 2000 ·	Palermo Ladies Open	· 2002 →

Silvia Farina Elia and Rita Grande were the defending champions, but none competed this year.

Tathiana Garbin and Janette Husárová won the title by defeating María José Martínez Sánchez and Anabel Medina Garrigues 4–6, 6–2, 6–4 in the final.

== Seeds ==
1. (Italy) Tathiana Garbin / (Slovakia) Janette Husárová (champions)
2. (Spain) María José Martínez Sánchez / (Spain) Anabel Medina Garrigues (final)
3. (Sweden) Åsa Carlsson / (Austria) Sylvia Plischke (semifinals)
4. (France) Alexandra Fusai / (Argentina) María Emilia Salerni (first round)

== Draw ==
=== Key ===
- Q = Qualifier
- WC = Wild card
- LL = Lucky loser
- Alt = Alternate
- SE = Special exempt
- PR = Protected ranking
- ITF = ITF entry
- JE = Junior exempt
- w/o = Walkover
- r = Retired
- d = Defaulted
- SR = Special ranking

=== Draw ===
First round
1	(Italy) T Garbin (Slovakia) J Husárová	6	6
(Argentina) E Chialvo (Spain) C Martínez Granados	2	1
(Federal Republic of Yugoslavia) S Načuk (Belarus) T Poutchek	1	6	2
(Greece) E Daniilidou (France) C Dhenin	6	2	6
3	(Sweden) Å Carlsson (Austria) S Plischke	6	4	6
WC	(Spain) M Serna (Italy) F Schiavone	3	6	3
(Bulgaria) L Bacheva (Spain) C Torrens Valero	7	6
(Spain) G Riera (Germany) C Schneider	5	4
(Italy) An Serra Zanetti (Germany) S Schmidle	3	7	6
(Brazil) J Cortez (Spain) M Ramón Climent	6	5	3
LL	(Bulgaria) M Geznenge (Ukraine) T Kovalchuk	7^{7}	2	6
4	(France) A Fusai (Argentina) ME Salerni	6^{3}	6	2
(Russia) E Kulikovskaya (Belarus) N Ostrovskaya	3	1
(Switzerland) E Gagliardi (Spain) G León García	6	6
Q	(Estonia) M Ani (Italy) L Dell'Angelo	4	6^{4}
2	(Spain) MJ Martínez Sánchez (Spain) A Medina Garrigues	6	7^{7}

Quarterfinals
1	(Italy) T Garbin (Slovakia) J Husárová	6	6
(Greece) E Daniilidou (France) C Dhenin	4	2
3	(Sweden) Å Carlsson (Austria) S Plischke	6	7
(Bulgaria) L Bacheva (Spain) C Torrens Valero	4	5
(Italy) An Serra Zanetti (Germany) S Schmidle	6	6
LL	(Bulgaria) M Geznenge (Ukraine) T Kovalchuk	4	2
(Switzerland) E Gagliardi (Spain) G León García	2	4
2	(Spain) MJ Martínez Sánchez (Spain) A Medina Garrigues	6	6

Semifinals
1	(Italy) T Garbin (Slovakia) J Husárová	6	6
3	(Sweden) Å Carlsson (Austria) S Plischke	2	3
(Italy) An Serra Zanetti (Germany) S Schmidle	4	7^{7}	4
2	(Spain) MJ Martínez Sánchez (Spain) A Medina Garrigues	6	6^{3}	6

Final
1	(Italy) T Garbin (Slovakia) J Husárová	4	6	6
2	(Spain) MJ Martínez Sánchez (Spain) A Medina Garrigues	6	2	4
