= 2000 Internazionali Femminili di Palermo – Doubles =

Doubles
- 2000 Internazionali Femminili di Palermo

Final
- Champions: (Italy) Silvia Farina (Italy) Rita Grande
- Runners-up: (Romania) Ruxandra Dragomir (Spain) Virginia Ruano Pascual
- Score: 6–4, 0–6, 7–6^{(8–6)}

Details
- Draw: 16 (1WC/1Q/1LL)
- Seeds: 4

Events
Singles	Doubles
← 1999 ·	Palermo Ladies Open	· 2001 →

Tina Križan and Katarina Srebotnik were the defending champions, but lost in semifinals to tournament winners Silvia Farina and Rita Grande.

Silvia Farina and Rita Grande won the title by defeating Ruxandra Dragomir and Virginia Ruano Pascual 6–4, 0–6, 7–6^{(8–6)} in the final.

== Seeds ==
1. (Slovenia) Tina Križan / (Slovenia) Katarina Srebotnik (semifinals)
2. (Romania) Ruxandra Dragomir / (Spain) Virginia Ruano Pascual (final)
3. (Italy) Silvia Farina / (Italy) Rita Grande (champions)
4. (Italy) Tathiana Garbin / (Slovakia) Janette Husárová (semifinals)

== Draw ==
=== Key ===
- Q = Qualifier
- WC = Wild card
- LL = Lucky loser
- Alt = Alternate
- SE = Special exempt
- PR = Protected ranking
- ITF = ITF entry
- JE = Junior exempt
- w/o = Walkover
- r = Retired
- d = Defaulted
- SR = Special ranking

=== Draw ===
First round
1	(Slovenia) T Križan (Slovenia) K Srebotnik	6	6
(Italy) A Canepa (Argentina) M Díaz Oliva	2	1
Q	(United States) S Reeves (Germany) S Schmidle	6	4	6
(South Africa) K Grant (Thailand) B Sangaram	3	6	1
3	(Italy) S Farina (Italy) R Grande	7	6
WC	(Italy) F Lubiani (Italy) Ad Serra Zanetti	5	4
(Poland) M Grzybowska (Bulgaria) P Nola	6	7
(Italy) F Pennetta (Uzbekistan) I Tulyaganova	1	5
(Russia) E Kulikovskaya (Belarus) T Poutchek	3	5
(Italy) G Casoni (Italy) An Serra Zanetti	6	7
(Spain) RM Andrés (Spain) C Martínez Granados	1	2
4	(Italy) T Garbin (Slovakia) J Husárová	6	6
LL	(Russia) A Myskina (Switzerland) M Vavrinec	4	2
(Belgium) L Courtois (Slovakia) H Nagyová	6	6
(Spain) A Medina Garrigues (Spain) G Riera	4	6^{5}
2	(Romania) R Dragomir (Spain) V Ruano Pascual	6	7^{7}

Quarterfinals
1	(Slovenia) T Križan (Slovenia) K Srebotnik	6	6
Q	(United States) S Reeves (Germany) S Schmidle	2	3
3	(Italy) S Farina (Italy) R Grande	6	6
(Poland) M Grzybowska (Bulgaria) P Nola	3	2
(Italy) G Casoni (Italy) An Serra Zanetti	6	4	3
4	(Italy) T Garbin (Slovakia) J Husárová	2	6	6
(Belgium) L Courtois (Slovakia) H Nagyová	4	5
2	(Romania) R Dragomir (Spain) V Ruano Pascual	6	7

Semifinals
1	(Slovenia) T Križan (Slovenia) K Srebotnik	3	2
3	(Italy) S Farina (Italy) R Grande	6	6
4	(Italy) T Garbin (Slovakia) J Husárová	4	3
2	(Romania) R Dragomir (Spain) V Ruano Pascual	6	6

Final
3	(Italy) S Farina (Italy) R Grande	6	0	7^{8}
2	(Romania) R Dragomir (Spain) V Ruano Pascual	4	6	6^{6}

== Qualifying ==
=== Qualifying seeds ===
1. (United States) Samantha Reeves / (Germany) Syna Schmidle (qualified)
2. (Germany) Bianka Lamade / (Germany) Caroline Schneider (second round)

=== Qualifiers ===
1. (United States) Samantha Reeves / (Germany) Syna Schmidle

=== Lucky losers ===
1. (Russia) Anastasia Myskina / (Switzerland) Miroslava Vavrinec

=== Qualifying draw ===
First round
(Australia) Mireille Dittmann (Australia) Natalie Dittmann	8
(Italy) Jasmine Angeli (Germany) Nina Nittinger	6
(Russia) Anastasia Myskina (Switzerland) Miroslava Vavrinec	8
(Italy) Maria Elena Camerin (Italy) Laura Dell'Angelo	4

Second round
1	(United States) Samantha Reeves (Germany) Syna Schmidle	8
(Australia) Mireille Dittmann (Australia) Natalie Dittmann	4
(Russia) Anastasia Myskina (Switzerland) Miroslava Vavrinec	9^{7}
2	(Germany) Bianka Lamade (Germany) Caroline Schneider	8^{3}

Qualifying competition
1	(United States) Samantha Reeves (Germany) Syna Schmidle	6	6
(Russia) Anastasia Myskina (Switzerland) Miroslava Vavrinec	3	4
