= 2002 Internazionali Femminili di Palermo =

- Date: 8–14 July
- Edition: 15th
- Category: Tier V
- Draw: 32S / 16D
- Prize money: $110,000
- Surface: Clay / outdoor
- Location: Palermo, Italy

Champions

Singles
- (Argentina) Mariana Díaz Oliva

Doubles
- (Russia) Evgenia Kulikovskaya (Russia) Ekaterina Sysoeva
← 2001 ·	Internazionali Femminili di Palermo	· 2003 →

The 2002 Internazionali Femminili di Palermo was a women's tennis tournament played on outdoor clay courts in Palermo, Italy that was part of the Tier V category of the 2002 WTA Tour. It was the 15th edition of the Internazionali Femminili di Palermo and took place from 8 July until 14 July 2002. Sixth-seeded Mariana Díaz Oliva won the singles title and earned $16,000 first-prize money.

== Finals ==
=== Singles ===
(Argentina) Mariana Díaz Oliva defeated (Russia) Vera Zvonareva, 6–7^{(6–8)}, 6–1, 6–3

- It was Díaz Oliva's only singles title of her career.

=== Doubles ===
(Russia) Evgenia Kulikovskaya / (Russia) Ekaterina Sysoeva defeated (Bulgaria) Lubomira Bacheva / (Germany) Angelika Rösch, 6–4, 6–3
