= 2002 Internazionali Femminili di Palermo – Singles =

Singles
- 2002 Internazionali Femminili di Palermo

Final
- Champion: (Argentina) Mariana Díaz Oliva
- Runner-up: (Russia) Vera Zvonareva
- Score: 6–7^{(6–8)}, 6–1, 6–3

Details
- Draw: 32 (2WC/4Q)
- Seeds: 8

Events
Singles	Doubles
← 2001 ·	Internazionali Femminili di Palermo	· 2003 →

Anabel Medina Garrigues was the defending champion, but did not compete this year.

Mariana Díaz Oliva won the title by defeating Vera Zvonareva 6–7^{(6–8)}, 6–1, 6–3 in the final.

== Seeds ==
1. (Argentina) Paola Suárez (semifinals, retired)
2. (Slovakia) Henrieta Nagyová (semifinals)
3. (Sweden) Åsa Svensson (second round)
4. (Germany) Gréta Arn (first round)
5. (Russia) Vera Zvonareva (final)
6. (Argentina) Mariana Díaz Oliva (champion)
7. (Germany) Angelika Rösch (second round)
8. (France) Céline Beigbeder (quarterfinals)

== Draw ==
=== Key ===
- Q = Qualifier
- WC = Wild card
- LL = Lucky loser
- Alt = Alternate
- SE = Special exempt
- PR = Protected ranking
- ITF = ITF entry
- JE = Junior exempt
- w/o = Walkover
- r = Retired
- d = Defaulted
- SR = Special ranking

=== Finals ===
Semifinals
1	(Argentina) Paola Suárez	5	r
5	(Russia) Vera Zvonareva	7
6	(Argentina) Mariana Díaz Oliva	6	6
2	(Slovakia) Henrieta Nagyová	2	3

Final
5	(Russia) Vera Zvonareva	7^{8}	1	3
6	(Argentina) Mariana Díaz Oliva	6^{6}	6	6

=== Top half ===
First round
1	(Argentina) P Suárez	6	6
(Croatia) M Palaveršić	2	2
(Czech Republic) Z Ondrášková	6	6
(Italy) An Serra Zanetti	1	0
(Spain) M Sánchez Lorenzo	3	4
WC	(Italy) G Pizzichini	6	6
(Italy) F Pennetta	3	4
8	(France) C Beigbeder	6	6
4	(Germany) G Arn	2	3
(Germany) J Kandarr	6	6
Q	(Russia) E Sysoeva	3	6	6
Q	(Ukraine) Y Beygelzimer	6	2	3
(Netherlands) S Noorlander	4	2
(Germany) B Lamade	6	6
(Czech Republic) I Benešová	2	6^{5}
5	(Russia) V Zvonareva	6	7^{7}

Second round
1	(Argentina) P Suárez	6	4	6
(Czech Republic) Z Ondrášková	2	6	2
WC	(Italy) G Pizzichini	3	3
8	(France) C Beigbeder	6	6
(Germany) J Kandarr	4	6^{5}
Q	(Russia) E Sysoeva	6	7^{7}
(Germany) B Lamade	6^{2}	0
5	(Russia) V Zvonareva	7^{7}	6

Quarterfinals
1	(Argentina) P Suárez	2	6	6
8	(France) C Beigbeder	6	1	3
Q	(Russia) E Sysoeva	0	4
5	(Russia) V Zvonareva	6	6

Semifinals
1	(Argentina) P Suárez	5	r
5	(Russia) V Zvonareva	7

=== Bottom half ===
First round
6	(Argentina) M Díaz Oliva	6	7
(Germany) N Dübbers	3	5
(Ukraine) T Perebiynis	6	6
Q	(Australia) C Wheeler	4	3
(Madagascar) D Randriantefy	1	1
(Bulgaria) L Bacheva	6	6
(Czech Republic) S Kleinová	4	3
3	(Sweden) Å Svensson	6	6
7	(Germany) A Rösch	6	6
WC	(Italy) N Viérin	2	4
(Russia) M Goloviznina	6	2	2
Q	(Belarus) N Ostrovskaya	4	6	6
(Russia) G Fokina	4	3
(Russia) E Kulikovskaya	6	6
(Poland) M Grzybowska	2	3
2	(Slovakia) H Nagyová	6	6

Second round
6	(Argentina) M Díaz Oliva	6	6
(Ukraine) T Perebiynis	2	4
(Bulgaria) L Bacheva	6	6
3	(Sweden) Å Svensson	3	3
7	(Germany) A Rösch	6	4	4
Q	(Belarus) N Ostrovskaya	3	6	6
(Russia) E Kulikovskaya	5	3
2	(Slovakia) H Nagyová	7	6

Quarterfinals
6	(Argentina) M Díaz Oliva	6	6
(Bulgaria) L Bacheva	4	1
Q	(Belarus) N Ostrovskaya	4	2
2	(Slovakia) H Nagyová	6	6

Semifinals
6	(Argentina) M Díaz Oliva	6	6
2	(Slovakia) H Nagyová	2	3
