= 2001 Internazionali Femminili di Palermo – Singles =

Singles
- 2001 Internazionali Femminili di Palermo

Final
- Champion: (Spain) Anabel Medina Garrigues
- Runner-up: (Spain) Cristina Torrens Valero
- Score: 6–4, 6–4

Details
- Draw: 32 (2WC/4Q/1LL)
- Seeds: 9

Events
Singles	Doubles
← 2000 ·	Palermo Ladies Open	· 2002 →

Henrieta Nagyová was the defending champion, but chose to compete at Vienna during the same week.

Anabel Medina Garrigues won the title by defeating Cristina Torrens Valero 6–4, 6–4 in the final.

== Seeds ==
1. (Spain) Magüi Serna (quarterfinals)
2. (Russia) Tatiana Panova (quarterfinals)
3. (Italy) Francesca Schiavone (quarterfinals)
4. (Spain) Gala León García (semifinals)
5. (Italy) Tathiana Garbin (quarterfinals)
6. (Germany) ~~Bianka Lamade~~ (withdrew)
7. (Spain) Cristina Torrens Valero (final)
8. (Slovakia) Janette Husárová (first round)
9. (Spain) Anabel Medina Garrigues (champion)

== Draw ==
=== Key ===
- Q = Qualifier
- WC = Wild card
- LL = Lucky loser
- Alt = Alternate
- SE = Special exempt
- PR = Protected ranking
- ITF = ITF entry
- JE = Junior exempt
- w/o = Walkover
- r = Retired
- d = Defaulted
- SR = Special ranking

=== Finals ===
Semifinals
7	(Spain) Cristina Torrens Valero	7^{7}	7^{7}
4	(Spain) Gala León García	6^{2}	6^{4}
(Sweden) Åsa Carlsson	1	6	3
9	(Spain) Anabel Medina Garrigues	6	4	6

Final
7	(Spain) Cristina Torrens Valero	4	4
9	(Spain) Anabel Medina Garrigues	6	6

=== Top half ===
First round
1	(Spain) M Serna	6	3	6
(Czech Republic) K Koukalová	3	6	2
(Bulgaria) L Bacheva	6	6
LL	(Italy) N Viérin	2	2
(Colombia) C Castaño	6	1	6
(Argentina) ME Salerni	1	6	3
WC	(Italy) G Pizzichini	2	3
7	(Spain) C Torrens Valero	6	6
4	(Spain) G León García	6	6
(Federal Republic of Yugoslavia) S Načuk	3	4
(Slovakia) M Suchá	3	2
(Italy) ME Camerin	6	6
(Spain) V Ruano Pascual	6	6
WC	(Italy) Ad Serra Zanetti	0	2
(Germany) An Barna	1	5
5	(Italy) T Garbin	6	7

Second round
1	(Spain) M Serna	6	7
(Bulgaria) L Bacheva	2	5
(Colombia) C Castaño	2	2
7	(Spain) C Torrens Valero	6	6
4	(Spain) G León García	6	6
(Italy) ME Camerin	0	1
(Spain) V Ruano Pascual	3	3
5	(Italy) T Garbin	6	6

Quarterfinals
1	(Spain) M Serna	4	3
7	(Spain) C Torrens Valero	6	6
4	(Spain) G León García	6	3	6
5	(Italy) T Garbin	4	6	3

Semifinals
7	(Spain) C Torrens Valero	7^{7}	7^{7}
4	(Spain) G León García	6^{2}	6^{4}

=== Bottom half ===
First round
8	(Slovakia) J Husárová	3	1
(Sweden) Å Carlsson	6	6
(Spain) MJ Martínez Sánchez	2	7	5
(Paraguay) R de los Ríos	6	5	7
(Slovakia) Ľ Cervanová	3	6	6
(Belarus) T Poutchek	6	2	2
(Austria) S Plischke	5	1
3	(Italy) F Schiavone	7	6
9	(Spain) A Medina Garrigues	6	7
Q	(Greece) E Daniilidou	3	5
Q	(Russia) E Kulikovskaya	6	1	6
(Switzerland) E Gagliardi	1	6	0
(Spain) N Llagostera Vives	6	1	3
Q	(France) A Fusai	3	6	6
Q	(Italy) G Casoni	3	4
2	(Russia) T Panova	6	6

Second round
(Sweden) Å Carlsson	6	6
(Paraguay) R de los Ríos	2	3
(Slovakia) Ľ Cervanová	3	6	5
3	(Italy) F Schiavone	6	4	7
9	(Spain) A Medina Garrigues	6	6
Q	(Russia) E Kulikovskaya	3	1
Q	(France) A Fusai	4	4
2	(Russia) T Panova	6	6

Quarterfinals
(Sweden) Å Carlsson	6	6
3	(Italy) F Schiavone	4	3
9	(Spain) A Medina Garrigues	6	6
2	(Russia) T Panova	1	2

Semifinals
(Sweden) Å Carlsson	1	6	3
9	(Spain) A Medina Garrigues	6	4	6
