= Jasmin Wöhr =

German tennis player

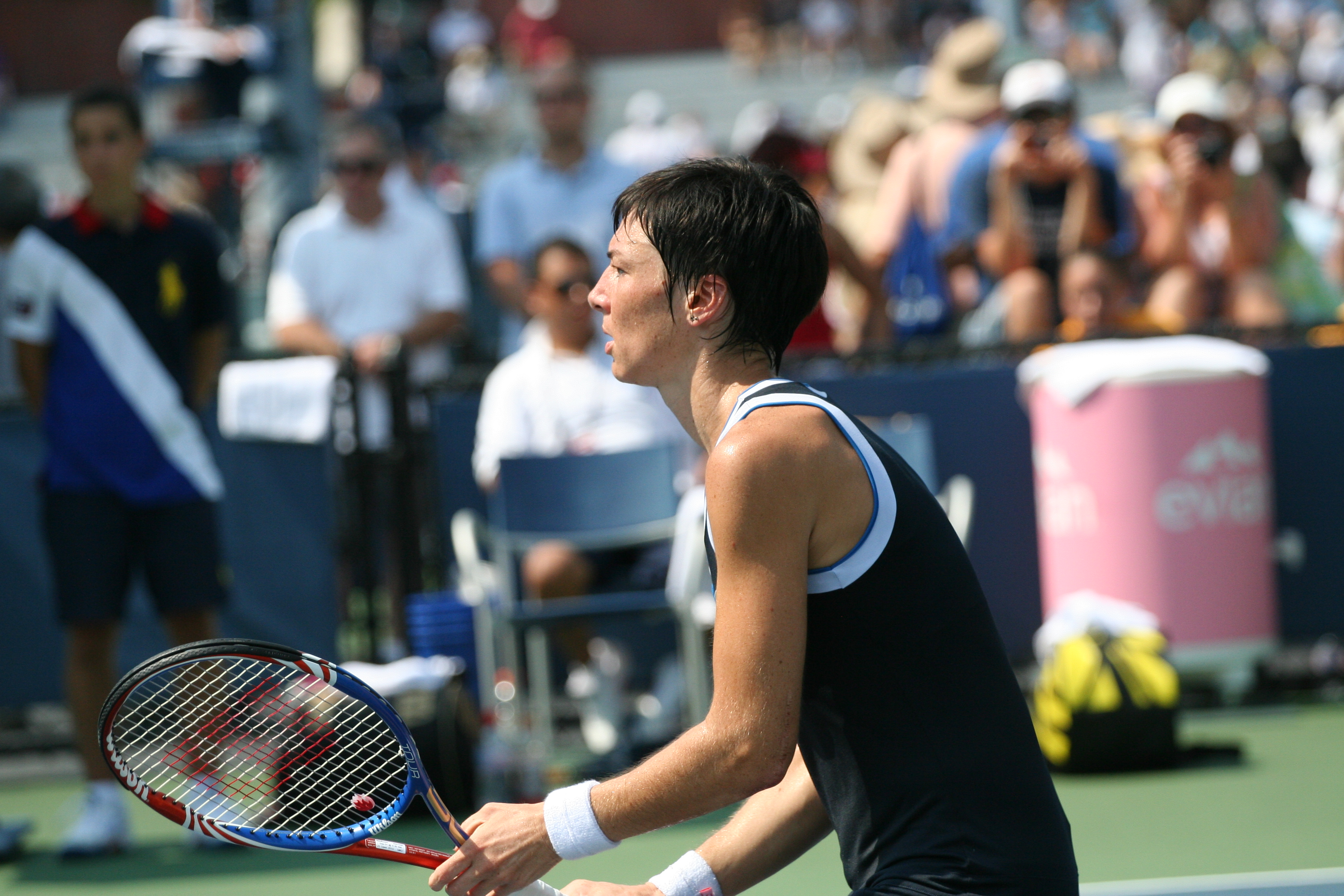
- Wöhr in 2010
- ITF name: Jasmin Woehr
- Country (sports): Germany
- Residence: Balingen, Germany
- Born: 21 August 1980 (age 45) Tübingen, West Germany
- Height: 1.76 m (5 ft 9 1/2 in)
- Turned pro: 1999
- Retired: 2012
- Plays: Right-handed (two-handed backhand)
- Prize money: $415,132

Singles
- Career record: 128–133
- Career titles: 0 WTA, 1 ITF
- Highest ranking: 188 (14 December 1998)

Grand Slam singles results
- US Open: Q1 (1998)

Doubles
- Career record: 285–255
- Career titles: 4 WTA, 23 ITF
- Highest ranking: 46 (23 July 2007)

Grand Slam doubles results
- Australian Open: 3R (2007)
- French Open: 2R (2007, 2011)
- Wimbledon: 2R (2004, 2007)
- US Open: 2R (2007)

Team competitions
- Fed Cup: 3–1

Jasmin Wöhr (German pronunciation: [jasˈmiːn ˈvøːɐ̯]; born 21 August 1980) is a German former tennis player.

== Biography ==
During her career, Wöhr won four doubles titles on the WTA Tour, and in addition one singles title and 23 doubles titles on the ITF Women's Circuit. On 14 December 1998, she reached her best singles ranking of world No. 188. On 23 July 2007, she peaked at No. 46 in the doubles rankings.

Playing for Germany Fed Cup team, Wöhr accumulated a win–loss record of 3–1.

In 1997, she won the girls' doubles title at the Australian Open with Mirjana Lučić.

Wöhr retired from professional tennis in 2012.

== Junior Grand Slam finals ==
=== Doubles: 1 (title) ===
Result	Year	Championship	Surface	Partner	Opponents	Score
Win	1997	Australian Open	Hard	(Croatia) Mirjana Lučić	(South Korea) Cho Yoon-jeong (Japan) Shiho Hisamatsu	6–2, 6–2

== WTA career finals ==
=== Doubles: 10 (4–6) ===
Legend (pre/post 2009)
Grand Slam tournaments
Tier I / Premier M & Premier 5
Tier II / Premier (0–1)
Tier III, IV & V / International (4–5)

Result	No.	Date	Tournament	Surface	Partner	Opponents	Score
Loss	1.	Jun 2002	Linz Open, Austria	Clay	(Austria) Barbara Schwartz	(Hungary) Petra Mandula (Austria) Patricia Wartusch	6–2, 0–6, 6–4
Win	1.	Jul 2002	French Community Championships, Belgium	Clay	(Austria) Barbara Schwartz	(Italy) Tathiana Garbin (Spain) Arantxa Sánchez Vicario	6–2, 0–6, 6–4
Win	2.	Feb 2004	Copa Colsanitas, Colombia	Clay	(Austria) Barbara Schwartz	(Spain) Anabel Medina Garrigues (Spain) Arantxa Parra Santonja	6–1, 6–3
Loss	2.	Feb 2006	Copa Colsanitas, Colombia	Clay	(Hungary) Ágnes Szávay	(Argentina) Gisela Dulko (Italy) Flavia Pennetta	7–6^{(7–1)}, 6–1
Loss	3.	Nov 2006	French Community Championships, Belgium	Carpet (i)	(Greece) Eleni Daniilidou	(United States) Lisa Raymond (Australia) Samantha Stosur	6–2, 6–3
Loss	4.	Sep 2007	Korea Open	Hard	(Greece) Eleni Daniilidou	(Chinese Taipei) Chuang Chia-jung (Chinese Taipei) Hsieh Su-wei	6–2, 6–2
Loss	5.	Jan 2008	Hobart International, Australia	Hard	(Greece) Eleni Daniilidou	(Spain) Anabel Medina Garrigues (Spain) Virginia Ruano Pascual	6–2, 6–4
Win	3.	Jul 2010	İstanbul Cup, Turkey	Hard	(Greece) Eleni Daniilidou	(Russia) Maria Kondratieva (Czech Republic) Vladimíra Uhlířová	6–4, 1–6, [11–9]
Loss	6.	Apr 2011	Porsche Tennis Grand Prix, Germany	Clay	(Germany) Kristina Barrois	(Germany) Sabine Lisicki (Australia) Samantha Stosur	6–1, 7–6^{(7–5)}
Win	4.	Jun 2011	Danish Open	Hard	(Sweden) Johanna Larsson	(France) Kristina Mladenovic (Poland) Katarzyna Piter	6–3, 6–3

== ITF Circuit finals ==
$100,000 tournaments
$75,000 tournaments
$50,000 tournaments
$25,000 tournaments
$10,000 tournaments

=== Singles: 1 (1–0) ===
Outcome	No.	Date	Tournament	Surface	Opponent	Score
Winner	1.	10 March 1996	ITF Buchen, Germany	Carpet (i)	(Germany) Tina Plivelitsch	6–3, 6–4

=== Doubles: 38 (23–15) ===
Outcome	No.	Date	Tournament	Surface	Partner	Opponents	Score
Winner	1.	19 October 1997	ITF Flensburg, Germany	Carpet (i)	(Austria) Patricia Wartusch	(Hungary) Virág Csurgó (Germany) Kirstin Freye	6–3, 3–6, 6–3
Winner	2.	12 April 1998	ITF Calvi, France	Hard	(Belgium) Nancy Feber	(France) Emmanuelle Curutchet (France) Sophie Georges	4–1 ret.
Runner-up	3.	6 July 1998	ITF Puchheim, Germany	Clay	(Germany) Silke Meier	(Hungary) Virág Csurgó (Hungary) Nóra Köves	6–4, 0–6, 3–6
Winner	4.	2 August 1998	ITF Les Contamines, France	Hard	(Bulgaria) Lubomira Bacheva	(France) Caroline Dhenin (France) Sophie Georges	2–6, 6–1, 6–3
Winner	5.	31 August 1998	ITF Hechingen, Germany	Clay	(Germany) Silke Meier	(Czech Republic) Linda Faltynková (Czech Republic) Blanka Kumbárová	6–2, 6–2
Winner	6.	20 September 1998	ITF Otočec, Slovenia	Clay	(Slovenia) Katarina Srebotnik	(Hungary) Nóra Köves (Serbia) Dragana Zarić	6–2, 6–3
Winner	7.	15 November 1998	ITF Hull, United Kingdom	Hard (i)	(Austria) Barbara Schwartz	(Italy) Francesca Lubiani (Italy) Maria Paola Zavagli	6–2, 6–3
Winner	8.	21 June 1999	ITF Stuttgart, Germany	Clay	(Austria) Patricia Wartusch	(Czech Republic) Radka Pelikánová (Czech Republic) Ludmila Richterová	6–1, 7–6
Runner-up	9.	25 July 1999	ITF Ettenheim, Germany	Clay	(Austria) Patricia Wartusch	(Spain) Eva Bes (Spain) Lourdes Domínguez Lino	5–7, 4–6
Runner-up	10.	1 November 1999	ITF Hull, United Kingdom	Hard (i)	(Czech Republic) Michaela Paštiková	(United Kingdom) Julie Pullin (United Kingdom) Lorna Woodroffe	4–6, 3–6
Runner-up	11.	8 November 1999	ITF Rungsted, Denmark	Carpet (i)	(Germany) Mia Buric	(Germany) Marketa Kochta (Germany) Syna Schmidle	6–4, 6–7 ^{(8)}, 2–6
Winner	12.	29 November 1999	ITF Cergy Pontoise, France	Hard (i)	(Denmark) Eva Dyrberg	(Germany) Anca Barna (Germany) Adriana Barna	2–6, 6–2, 6–4
Runner-up	13.	3 April 2000	ITF Cagliari, Italy	Clay	(Czech Republic) Michaela Paštiková	(Spain) Lourdes Domínguez Lino (Spain) Alicia Ortuño	5–7, 6–3, 3–6
Winner	14.	23 April 2000	ITF Prostějov, Czech Republic	Clay	(Czech Republic) Michaela Paštiková	(Czech Republic) Helena Vildová (Czech Republic) Magdalena Zděnovcová	3–6, 6–1, 7–6^{(10)}
Runner-up	15.	1 May 2000	ITF Hatfield, United Kingdom	Clay	(Hungary) Zsófia Gubacsi	(Tunisia) Selima Sfar (United Kingdom) Joanne Ward	6–7^{(8)}, 2–6
Runner-up	16.	9 July 2000	ITF Stuttgart, Germany	Clay	(Germany) Andrea Glass	(Hungary) Virág Csurgó (Hungary) Eva Martincová	2–6, 6–2, 4–6
Winner	17.	17 July 2000	ITF Le Touquet, France	Clay	(Germany) Bianka Lamade	(Argentina) Eugenia Chialvo (Spain) Lourdes Domínguez Lino	6–3, 7–5
Winner	18.	26 August 2000	ITF Maribor, Slovenia	Clay	(Germany) Angelika Rösch	(Argentina) Vanesa Krauth (Switzerland) Aliénor Tricerri	6–4, 4–6, 7–6^{(1)}
Winner	19.	7 July 2002	ITF Stuttgart, Germany	Clay	(Austria) Barbara Schwartz	(Belarus) Darya Kustova (Slovenia) Petra Rampre	5–7, 6–4, 7–6^{(4)}
Winner	20.	5 August 2002	Ladies Open Hechingen, Germany	Clay	(Germany) Andrea Glass	(Germany) Lydia Steinbach (New Zealand) Shelley Stephens	6–4, 7–5
Runner-up	21.	20 October 2002	Open de Touraine, France	Hard (i)	(Czech Republic) Michaela Paštiková	(Ukraine) Valeria Bondarenko (Ukraine) Alona Bondarenko	6–7^{(4)}, 6–4, 3–6
Winner	22.	4 August 2003	Ladies Open Hechingen, Germany	Clay	(Germany) Angelika Bachmann	(Austria) Daniela Klemenschits (Austria) Sandra Klemenschits	6–1, 6–4
Runner-up	23.	3 August 2004	Ladies Open Hechingen, Germany	Clay	(Argentina) Erica Krauth	(Slovakia) Eva Fislová (Slovakia) Stanislava Hrozenská	6–3, 3–6, 3–6
Winner	24.	15 August 2004	ITF Martina Franca, Italy	Clay	(France) Aurélie Védy	(Russia) Nina Bratchikova (Italy) Giulia Casoni	6–1, 3–6, 7–6^{(8)}
Runner-up	25.	13 September 2004	ITF Bordeaux, France	Clay	(Argentina) Erica Krauth	(France) Stéphanie Cohen-Aloro (Tunisia) Selima Sfar	6–3, 3–6, 3–6
Winner	26.	4 October 2004	ITF Girona, Spain	Clay	(Argentina) Erica Krauth	(Austria) Daniela Klemenschits (Austria) Sandra Klemenschits	2–6, 6–4, 6–3
Winner	27.	14 August 2005	Ladies Open Hechingen, Germany	Clay	(Germany) Kristina Barrois	(Czech Republic) Renata Voráčová (Czech Republic) Sandra Záhlavová	4–6, 7–6^{3}, 6–4
Runner-up	28.	18 September 2005	ITF Bordeaux, France	Clay	(Germany) Julia Schruff	(Spain) María José Martínez Sánchez (Spain) Conchita Martínez Granados	5–7, 2–6
Winner	29.	4 September 2006	Open Denain, France	Clay	(Switzerland) Romina Oprandi	(Poland) Klaudia Jans-Ignacik (Poland) Alicja Rosolska	4–6, 6–2, 6–4
Runner-up	30.	11 September 2006	ITF Bordeaux, France	Clay	(Hungary) Kira Nagy	(France) Stéphanie Foretz (Germany) Julia Schruff	6–7, 5–7
Runner-up	31.	27 March 2009	ITF La Palma, Spain	Hard	(Greece) Eleni Daniilidou	(China) Lu Jingjing (China) Sun Shengnan	2–6, 7–5, [5–10]
Winner	32.	3 August 2009	Ladies Open Hechingen, Germany	Clay	(Austria) Yvonne Meusburger	(Argentina) Erica Krauth (Sweden) Hanna Nooni	6–2, 7–6^{(1)}
Runner-up	33.	21 August 2009	ITF Westende, Belgium	Hard	(France) Émilie Bacquet	(Russia) Vasilisa Davydova (Georgia (country)) Margalita Chakhnashvili	2–6, 5–7
Winner	34.	28 September 2009	ITF Athens, Greece	Hard	(Greece) Eleni Daniilidou	(Switzerland) Timea Bacsinszky (Italy) Tathiana Garbin	6–2, 5–7, [10–4]
Winner	35.	2 November 2009	Ismaning Open, Germany	Carpet (i)	(Greece) Eleni Daniilidou	(Belarus) Ekaterina Dzehalevich (Czech Republic) Eva Hrdinová	6–2, 4–6, [10–5]
Winner	36.	13 September 2010	ITF Sofia, Bulgaria	Hard	(Greece) Eleni Daniilidou	(Austria) Sandra Klemenschits (Germany) Tatjana Malek	6–3, 6–4
Winner	37.	24 July 2011	ITF Pétange, Luxembourg	Clay	(Sweden) Johanna Larsson	(Germany) Anna-Lena Grönefeld (Germany) Kristina Barrois	7–6, 6–4
Runner-up	38.	25 September 2011	Open de Saint-Malo, France	Clay	(Sweden) Johanna Larsson	(Russia) Nina Bratchikova (Croatia) Darija Jurak	4–6, 2–6
