= 2001 Internazionali Femminili di Palermo =

- Date: 9–15 July
- Edition: 14th
- Category: Tier V
- Draw: 32S / 16D
- Prize money: $110,000
- Surface: Clay / outdoor
- Location: Palermo, Italy

Champions

Singles
- (Spain) Anabel Medina Garrigues

Doubles
- (Italy) Tathiana Garbin / (Slovakia) Janette Husárová
← 2000 ·	Internazionali Femminili di Palermo	· 2002 →

The 2001 Internazionali Femminili di Palermo was a women's tennis tournament played on outdoor clay courts in Palermo, Italy that was part of the Tier V category of the 2001 WTA Tour. It was the 14th edition of the Internazionali Femminili di Palermo and took place from 9 July until 15 July 2001. Ninth-seeded Anabel Medina Garrigues won the singles title and earned $16,000 first-prize money.

== Finals ==
=== Singles ===
(Spain) Anabel Medina Garrigues defeated (Spain) Cristina Torrens Valero, 6–4, 6–4

- It was Medina Garrigues's first singles title of her career.

=== Doubles ===
(Italy) Tathiana Garbin / (Slovakia) Janette Husárová defeated (Spain) María José Martínez Sánchez / (Spain) Anabel Medina Garrigues, 4–6, 6–2, 6–4
