= 1995 Fed Cup World Group play-offs =

The World Group play-offs were four tied tennis matches which involved the losing nations of the World Group first round and the winning nations of the World Group II. Nations that won their play-off ties entered the 1996 World Group, while losing nations joined the 1996 World Group II.

== Argentina vs. Australia ==
Argentina
5
Tucumán Lawn Tennis Club, San Miguel, Argentina
22–23 July 1995
Red clay (outdoors)

Australia
0

			1	2	3
1	(Argentina) (Australia)	Florencia Labat; Nicole Bradtke	6; 3	6; 2
2	(Argentina) (Australia)	Gabriela Sabatini; Rachel McQuillan	6; 2	6; 2
3	(Argentina) (Australia)	Gabriela Sabatini; Nicole Bradtke	6; 0	3; 6	6; 2
4	(Argentina) (Australia)	Florencia Labat; Rennae Stubbs	6; 2	6; 4
5	(Argentina) (Australia)	Inés Gorrochategui / Gabriela Sabatini; Nicole Bradtke / Rennae Stubbs	6; 2	6; 3

== South Africa vs. Bulgaria ==
South Africa
5
Free State Stadium, Bloemfontein, South Africa
22–23 July 1995
Decoturf (outdoors)

Bulgaria
0

			1	2	3
1	(South Africa) (Bulgaria)	Joannette Kruger; Lubomira Bacheva	6; 0	6; 3
2	(South Africa) (Bulgaria)	Amanda Coetzer; Pavlina Stoyanova	6; 0	6; 1
3	(South Africa) (Bulgaria)	Amanda Coetzer; Lubomira Bacheva	6; 2	6; 4
4	(South Africa) (Bulgaria)	Joannette Kruger; Pavlina Stoyanova	6; 3	6; 1
5	(South Africa) (Bulgaria)	Amanda Coetzer / Elna Reinach; Lubomira Bacheva / Dora Djilianova	6; 1	6; 4

== Japan vs. Canada ==
Japan
5
Gifu Memorial Center, Gifu, Japan
22–23 July 1995
Supreme carpet (indoors)

Canada
0

			1	2	3
1	(Japan) (Canada)	Kimiko Date; Jana Nejedly	6; 2	6; 2
2	(Japan) (Canada)	Naoko Sawamatsu; Patricia Hy	7^{7} 6^{4}	6; 4
3	(Japan) (Canada)	Kimiko Date; Patricia Hy	6; 3	4; 6	6; 1
4	(Japan) (Canada)	Naoko Sawamatsu; Jana Nejedly	6; 4	4; 6	6; 3
5	(Japan) (Canada)	Kyōko Nagatsuka / Ai Sugiyama; Jill Hetherington / Rene Simpson	5; 7	6; 3	6; 4

== Netherlands vs. Austria ==
Netherlands
1
Casino Racing Club, Noordwijk, Netherlands
22–23 July 1995
Supreme carpet (outdoors)

Austria
4

			1	2	3
1	(Netherlands) (Austria)	Miriam Oremans; Beate Reinstadler	6; 4	5; 7	6; 2
2	(Netherlands) (Austria)	Kristie Boogert; Judith Wiesner	3; 6	6; 1	3; 6
3	(Netherlands) (Austria)	Miriam Oremans; Judith Wiesner	2; 6	2; 6
4	(Netherlands) (Austria)	Kristie Boogert; Beate Reinstadler	6^{7} 7^{9}	4; 6
5	(Netherlands) (Austria)	Nicole Muns-Jagerman / Caroline Vis; Barbara Schett / Petra Schwarz	6^{6} 7^{8}	6; 1	4; 6

== See also ==
- Fed Cup structure
