= 1995 Fed Cup World Group II =

International women's tennis competition

The World Group II was the second highest level of Fed Cup competition in 1995. Winning nations advanced to the World Group play-offs, and the losing nations were demoted to the World Group II play-offs.

== Indonesia vs. Argentina ==
Indonesia
2
Gelora Senayan Stadium, Jakarta, Indonesia
22–23 April 1995
Rebound Ace (outdoors)

Argentina
3

			1	2	3
1	(Indonesia) (Argentina)	Romana Tedjakusuma; Gabriela Sabatini	5; 7	2; 6
2	(Indonesia) (Argentina)	Yayuk Basuki; Florencia Labat	7; 5	6; 4
3	(Indonesia) (Argentina)	Yayuk Basuki; Gabriela Sabatini	7; 5	6; 4
4	(Indonesia) (Argentina)	Romana Tedjakusuma; Florencia Labat	3; 6	2; 6
5	(Indonesia) (Argentina)	Yayuk Basuki / Romana Tedjakusuma; Gabriela Sabatini / Patricia Tarabini	4; 6	7^{7} 6^{3}	3; 6

== Australia vs. Slovakia ==
Australia
3
Royal King's Park, Perth, Australia
22–23 April 1995
Grass (outdoors)

Slovakia
2

			1	2	3
1	(Australia) (Slovakia)	Rachel McQuillan; Karina Habšudová	1; 6	3; 6
2	(Australia) (Slovakia)	Nicole Bradtke; Radka Zrubáková	4; 6	6; 4	6; 3
3	(Australia) (Slovakia)	Nicole Bradtke; Karina Habšudová	7; 5	6; 4
4	(Australia) (Slovakia)	Rachel McQuillan; Radka Zrubáková	6^{3} 7^{7}	2; 6
5	(Australia) (Slovakia)	Nicole Bradtke / Rennae Stubbs; Karina Habšudová / Radka Zrubáková	6; 1	6; 0

== Italy vs. Canada ==
Italy
2
Ancona TA, Ancona, Italy
22–23 April 1995
Red clay (outdoors)

Canada
3

			1	2	3
1	(Italy) (Canada)	Sandra Cecchini; Rene Simpson	4; 6	3; 6
2	(Italy) (Canada)	Silvia Farina; Patricia Hy	6; 3	6^{4} 7^{7}	6; 8
3	(Italy) (Canada)	Sandra Cecchini; Patricia Hy	2; 6	3; 6
4	(Italy) (Canada)	Silvia Farina; Rene Simpson	7; 5	6; 0
5	(Italy) (Canada)	Laura Golarsa / Adriana Serra Zanetti; Jill Hetherington / Rene Simpson	7^{7} 6^{5}	6; 2

== Netherlands vs. Sweden ==
Netherlands
5
Vasagatan Hall, Västerås, Sweden
22–23 April 1995
Taraflex (indoors)

Sweden
0

			1	2	3
1	(Netherlands) (Sweden)	Kristie Boogert; Åsa Carlsson	6; 3	5; 7	6; 1
2	(Netherlands) (Sweden)	Miriam Oremans; Maria Strandlund	6; 3	6; 1
3	(Netherlands) (Sweden)	Miriam Oremans; Åsa Carlsson	2; 6	7^{7} 6^{4}	6; 3
4	(Netherlands) (Sweden)	Kristie Boogert; Maria Strandlund	6^{1} 7^{7}	6; 3	6; 0
5	(Netherlands) (Sweden)	Manon Bollegraf / Caroline Vis; Maria Lindström / Maria Strandlund	6; 1	6; 3

== See also ==
- Fed Cup structure
