= 2000 Internazionali Femminili di Palermo =

- Date: 10–16 July
- Edition: 13th
- Category: Tier IV Series
- Draw: 32S / 16D
- Prize money: $110,000
- Surface: Clay / outdoor
- Location: Palermo, Italy

Champions

Singles
- (Slovakia) Henrieta Nagyová

Doubles
- (Italy) Silvia Farina Elia / (Italy) Rita Grande
← 1999 ·	Internazionali Femminili di Palermo	· 2001 →

The 2000 Torneo Internazionali Femminili di Palermo was a women's tennis tournament played on outdoor clay courts in Palermo, Italy that was part of the Tier IV Series of the 2000 WTA Tour. It was the 13th edition of the Internazionali Femminili di Palermo and took place from 10 July until 16 July 2000. Unseeded Henrieta Nagyová won the singles title and earned $16,000 first-prize money.

== Finals ==
=== Singles ===
(Slovakia) Henrieta Nagyová defeated (Bulgaria) Pavlina Nola, 6–3, 7–5

- It was Nagyová's 2nd singles title of the year and the 7th of her career.

=== Doubles ===
(Italy) Silvia Farina Elia / (Italy) Rita Grande defeated (Romania) Ruxandra Dragomir / (Spain) Virginia Ruano Pascual, 6–4, 0–6, 7–6^{(8–6)}
