= Mia Buric =

German tennis player

- Native name: Mia Burić
- Country (sports): Germany
- Residence: Kornwestheim, Germany
- Born: 23 May 1982 (age 43) Split, SFR Yugoslavia (now Croatia)
- Turned pro: 1996
- Retired: 2003
- Plays: Right Handed (Double Handed Backhand)
- Prize money: US$ 57,475

Singles
- Career record: 79 – 66
- Career titles: 0 WTA, 3 ITF
- Highest ranking: No. 204 (17 July 2000)

Grand Slam singles results
- French Open: Q1 (2001)
- US Open: Q1 (2000, 2001)

Doubles
- Career record: 35 – 38
- Career titles: 0 WTA, 2 ITF
- Highest ranking: No. 176 (11 June 2001)

Mia Buric (born 23 May 1982) is a former German tennis player. She has won 3 singles and 2 doubles titles on the ITF tour in her career. Her career-high ranking is world number 204 was achieved in July 2000. Her highest ranking in doubles is world number 176 on 11 June 2001. Buric retired from professional tennis in 2003.

== WTA career finals ==
=== Doubles: 1 (0–1) ===
Legend: Before 2009	Legend: Starting in 2009
Grand Slam tournaments (0)
WTA Championships (0)
Tier I (0)	Premier Mandatory (0)
Tier II (0/0)	Premier 5 (0)
Tier III (0/0)	Premier (0/0)
Tier IV & V (0/1)	International (0/0)

Result	Date	Category	Tournament	Surface	Partner	Opponents	Score
Loss	Jun 2002	Tier IV	Tashkent Open, Uzbekistan	Hard	(Russia) Galina Fokina	(Ukraine) Tatiana Perebiynis (Belarus) Tatiana Poutchek	5–7, 2–6

== Junior Grand Slam finals ==
=== Doubles ===
Result	Year	Championship	Surface	Partner	Opponents	Score
Loss	1999	French Open	Clay	(Belgium) Kim Clijsters	(Italy) Flavia Pennetta (Italy) Roberta Vinci	5–7, 7–5, 4–6

== ITF Circuit finals ==
=== Singles (3–2) ===
Legend
$100,000 tournaments
$75,000 tournaments
$50,000 tournaments
$25,000 tournaments
$10,000 tournaments

Result	Date	Category	Tournament	Surface	Opponent	Score
Win	21 September 1998	10,000	Sunderland, United Kingdom	Hard (i)	(Russia) Julia Lutrova	6–2, 7–6 ^{(7–4)}
Win	28 September 1998	10,000	Glasgow, United Kingdom	Carpet (i)	(Netherlands) Brechtje Bruls	6–4, 3–6, 6–1
Loss	26 July 1999	25,000	Pamplona, Spain	Hard	(United Kingdom) Joanne Ward	2–6, 4–6
Loss	3 July 2000	25,000	Vaihingen, Germany	Clay	(Germany) Miriam Schnitzer	3–6, 4–6
Win	23 October 2000	25,000	Saint-Raphaël, France	Hard (i)	(Estonia) Maret Ani	4–2, 1–4, 2–4, 5–3, 5–3

=== Doubles (2–3) ===
Result	Date	Category	Tournament	Surface	Partner	Opponents	Score
Loss	8 November 1999	25,000	Rungsted, Denmark	Carpet (i)	(Germany) Jasmin Wöhr	(Germany) Marketa Kochta (Germany) Syna Schmidle	6–4, 6–7 ^{(6–8)}, 2–6
Win	12 June 2000	25,000	Lenzerheide, Switzerland	Clay	(Germany) Bianka Lamade	(Netherlands) Yvette Basting (Netherlands) Andrea van den Hurk	7–5, 6–3
Win	24 July 2000	25,000	Pamplona, Spain	Hard	(Netherlands) Yvette Basting	(New Zealand) Leanne Baker (Colombia) Mariana Mesa	6–2, 6–0
Loss	16 October 2000	25,000	Joué-lès-Tours, France	Hard (i)	(Italy) Laura Dell'Angelo	(Greece) Eleni Daniilidou (Bulgaria) Maria Geznenge	3–5, 1–4, 0–4
Loss	30 October 2000	25,000	Hull, United Kingdom	Hard (i)	(Germany) Syna Schmidle	(United Kingdom) Julie Pullin (United Kingdom) Lorna Woodroffe	1–4, 4–1, 1–4, 4–5 ^{(4–7)}
