= Andreea Ehritt-Vanc =

Romanian tennis player

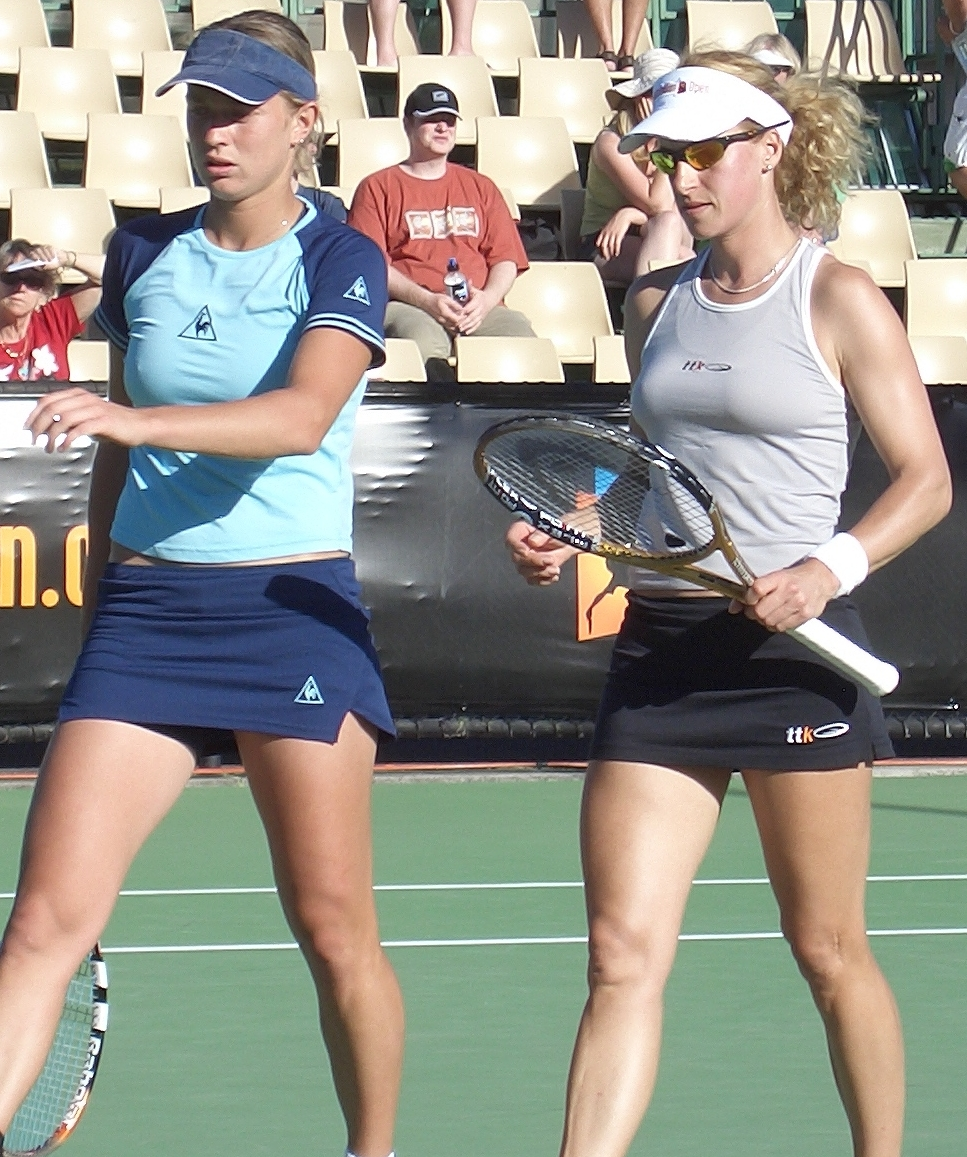
- Ehritt-Vanc (right) with doubles partner Maret Ani
- Country (sports): Romania
- Born: 6 October 1973 (age 52) Timișoara, Romania
- Height: 1.70 m (5 ft 7 in)
- Turned pro: 1992
- Retired: 2008
- Plays: Left-handed (two-handed backhand)
- Prize money: US$ 426,943

Singles
- Career record: 306–235
- Career titles: 13 ITF
- Highest ranking: No. 135 (17 February 2003)

Grand Slam singles results
- Australian Open: Q3 (1999, 2003)
- French Open: Q3 (2002)
- Wimbledon: Q3 (2003)
- US Open: Q2 (2002, 2003)

Doubles
- Career record: 301–249
- Career titles: 2 WTA, 24 ITF
- Highest ranking: No. 40 (8 May 2006)

Grand Slam doubles results
- Australian Open: 3R (2005)
- French Open: 3R (2005)
- Wimbledon: 2R (2003, 2006)
- US Open: 2R (2005, 2006)

Mixed doubles
- Career record: 0–4
- Career titles: 0

Grand Slam mixed doubles results
- Australian Open: 1R (2007)
- Wimbledon: 1R (2005, 2006)
- US Open: 1R (2006)

Andreea Ehritt-Vanc (born 6 October 1973) is a Romanian former professional tennis player. Vanc played predominantly in doubles, and won two WTA Tour titles. Her best performance at the major tournaments is third round: at the 2005 Australian Open and the 2005 French Open. She achieved her career-high rank of No. 40 on 8 May 2006.

== Doubles ==
Current through the 2008 US Open.

Tournament	1995	1996	1997	1998	1999	2000	2001	2002	2003	2004	2005	2006	2007	2008	SR	W–L	Win %
Grand Slam tournaments
Australian Open	A							1R	2R	1R	3R	2R	1R	A	0 / 6	4–6	40%
French Open	A							1R	1R	A	3R	2R	2R	A	0 / 5	4–5	44%
Wimbledon	A							1R	2R	A	1R	2R	1R	A	0 / 5	2–5	29%
US Open	A								1R	1R	2R	2R	1R	A	0 / 5	2–5	29%
Win–loss	0–0	0–0	0–0	0–0	0–0	0–0	0–0	0–3	2–4	0–2	5–4	4–4	1–4	0–0	0 / 21	12–21	36%
National representation
Olympic Games	NH	A	NH			A	NH			A	NH			A	0 / 0	0–0	–
WTA 1000 tournaments
Italian Open	A						1R	A							0 / 1	0–1	0%
Win–loss	0–0	0–0	0–0	0–0	0–0	0–0	0–1	0–0	0–0	0–0	0–0	0–0	0–0	0–0	0 / 1	0–1	0%
Career total	0–0	0–0	0–0	0–0	0–0	0–0	0–1	0–3	2–4	0–2	5–4	4–4	1–4	0–0	0 / 22	12–22	35%

== Mixed doubles ==
Current through the 2012 US Open.

Tournament	2002	2003	2004	2005	2006	2007	2008	2009	2010	2011	2012	SR	W–L	Win %
Grand Slam tournaments
Australian Open	A					1R	A					0 / 1	0–1	0%
French Open	A											0 / 0	0–0	–
Wimbledon	A			1R	1R	A						0 / 2	0–2	0%
US Open	A				1R	A						0 / 1	0–1	0%
Win–loss	0–0	0–0	0–0	0–1	0–2	0–1	0–0	0–0	0–0	0–0	0–0	0 / 4	0–4	0%
National representation
Olympic Games	NH		A	NH			A	NH			A	0 / 0	0–0	–
Career total	0–0	0–0	0–0	0–1	0–2	0–1	0–0	0–0	0–0	0–0	0–0	0 / 4	0–4	0%

== WTA career finals ==
=== Doubles: 6 (2 titles, 4 runner-ups) ===
Legend
Tier I
Tier II
Tier III
Tier IV

Result	Date	Tournament	Surface	Partner	Opponents	Score
Loss	May 1999	Bol Open, Croatia	Clay	(United States) Meghann Shaughnessy	(Croatia) Jelena Kostanić (Czech Republic) Michaela Paštiková	5–7, 7–6^{(9–7)}, 2–6
Loss	Jul 2001	Knokke-Heist, Belgium	Clay	(Romania) Ruxandra Dragomir	(Spain) Virginia Ruano Pascual (Spain) Magüi Serna	4–6, 3–6
Win	May 2005	Strasbourg, France	Clay	(Spain) Rosa María Andrés Rodríguez	(Poland) Marta Domachowska (Germany) Marlene Weingärtner	6–3, 6–1
Loss	May 2006	Strasbourg, France	Clay	(Germany) Martina Müller	(South Africa) Liezel Huber (United States) Martina Navratilova	2–6, 6–7^{(1–7)}
Win	May 2007	Estoril Open, Portugal	Clay	(Russia) Anastasia Rodionova	(Spain) Lourdes Domínguez Lino (Spain) Arantxa Parra Santonja	6–3, 6–2
Loss	May 2007	Morocco Open	Clay	(Russia) Anastasia Rodionova	(United States) Vania King (India) Sania Mirza	1–6, 2–6

== ITF Circuit finals ==
Legend
$100,000 tournaments
$75,000 tournaments
$50,000 tournaments
$25,000 tournaments
$10,000 tournaments

=== Singles: 21 (13–8) ===
Result	No.	Date	Tournament	Surface	Opponent	Score
Loss	1.	8 October 1990	Bol, Yugoslavia	Clay	(Socialist Federal Republic of Yugoslavia) Barbara Mulej	4–6, 0–6
Win	2.	16 September 1991	Capua, Italy	Clay	(Netherlands) Eva Haslinghuis	6–2, 6–4
Win	3.	24 August 1992	La Spezia, Italy	Clay	(Italy) Laura Lapi	6–4, 6–2
Win	4.	31 August 1992	Massa, Italy	Clay	(Czechoslovakia) Květa Peschke	6–1, 6–2
Loss	5.	21 August 1995	Catania, Italy	Clay	(Italy) Cristina Salvi	3–6, 3–6
Loss	6.	24 June 1996	Orbetello, Italy	Clay	(Italy) Paola Tampieri	1–6, 6–7^{(2)}
Win	7.	23 June 1997	Milan, Italy	Grass	(Croatia) Marijana Kovačević	6–2, 6–3
Win	8.	30 June 1997	Sezze, Italy	Clay	(Italy) Maria Paola Zavagli	6–4, 0–6, 6–2
Win	9.	8 September 1997	Fano, Italy	Clay	(Switzerland) Emanuela Zardo	6–3, 7–5
Loss	10.	15 June 1998	Grado, Italy	Clay	(Austria) Evelyn Fauth	7–6^{(4)}, 1–6, 1–6
Win	11.	17 August 1998	Mascali, Italy	Clay	(Australia) Mireille Dittmann	2–6, 6–3, 6–1
Win	12.	14 September 1998	Reggio Calabria, Italy	Clay	(Austria) Stefanie Haidner	7–5, 6–3
Win	13.	9 November 1998	Suzano, Brazil	Clay	(Italy) Laura Dell'Angelo	6–4, 6–3
Loss	14.	22 November 1998	Buenos Aires, Argentina	Clay	(Argentina) Paola Suárez	6–4, 1–6, 4–6
Loss	15.	14 August 2000	Aosta, Italy	Clay	(Italy) Mara Santangelo	6–1, 0–6, 1–6
Win	16.	8 October 2000	Fiumicino, Italy	Clay	(Estonia) Maret Ani	4–1, 4–1, 3–5, 4–1
Loss	17.	15 October 2000	Ciampino, Italy	Clay	(Romania) Ioana Gaspar	4–5 0–4 1–4
Win	18.	9 April 2001	Quartu Sant'Elena, Italy	Clay	(Czech Republic) Paulina Slitrova	6–3, 6–3
Loss	19.	16 April 2001	Cagliari, Italy	Clay	(Russia) Svetlana Kuznetsova	3–6, 4–6
Win	20.	21 May 2001	Casale, Italy	Clay	(Russia) Raissa Gourevitch	6–3, 6–4
Win	21.	3 June 2002	Galatina, Italy	Clay	(Russia) Oksana Karyshkova	6–2, 6–2

=== Doubles: 49 (24–25) ===
Result	No.	Date	Tournament	Surface	Partner	Opponents	Score
Loss	1.	28 September 1992	Santa Maria Capua Vetere, Italy	Clay	(Italy) Ginevra Mugnaini	(Belgium) Ann Devries (Romania) Irina Spîrlea	0–6, 0–6
Win	2.	10 July 1995	Vigo, Spain	Clay	(Germany) Kirstin Freye	(Spain) Estefanía Bottini (Spain) Gala León García	2–6, 6–3, 6–3
Win	3.	21 August 1995	Catania, Italy	Clay	(France) Vanina Casanova	(Australia) Natalie Frawley (Australia) Jenny-Ann Fetch	6–3, 6–3
Loss	4.	22 April 1996	Bari, Italy	Clay	(Italy) Germana Di Natale	(Czech Republic) Jana Macurová (Czech Republic) Olga Vymetálková	4–6, 6–4, 5–7
Loss	5.	24 June 1996	Orbetello, Italy	Clay	(Italy) Cristina Salvi	(Japan) Tomoe Hotta (Japan) Yoriko Yamagishi	6–3, 5–7, 2–6
Win	6.	1 July 1996	Sezze, Italy	Clay (i)	(San Marino) Francesca Guardigli	(Italy) Gabriella Boschiero (Argentina) Veronica Stele	0–6, 6–2, 6–3
Win	7.	21 July 1996	Fiumicino, Italy	Clay	(Bulgaria) Teodora Nedeva	(Italy) Gabriella Boschiero (Italy) Sara Ventura	6–0, 6–3
Win	8.	3 February 1997	Mallorca, Spain	Clay	(Italy) Cristina Salvi	(Italy) Alice Canepa (Italy) Sara Ventura	6–3, 3–6, 6–2
Win	9.	10 February 1997	Mallorca, Spain	Clay	(Italy) Cristina Salvi	(Slovakia) Viviana Mracnová (Slovakia) Martina Ondrejková	6–2, 6–1
Loss	10.	21 April 1997	San Severo, Italy	Clay	(Italy) Maria-Paola Zavagli	(Italy) Sabina Da Ponte (Italy) Laura Dell'Angelo	4–6, 6–4, 4–6
Win	11.	9 June 1997	Camucia, Italy	Hard	(Italy) Cristina Salvi	(Italy) Antonella Serra Zanetti (Italy) Maria-Paola Zavagli	6–4, 6–1
Loss	12.	30 June 1997	Sezze, Italy	Clay	(Russia) Anna Linkova	(Italy) Laura Garrone (Italy) Elena Savoldi	3–6, 0–6
Win	13.	8 September 1997	Fano, Italy	Clay	(Italy) Federica Fortuni	(Australia) Jenny-Ann Fetch (Australia) Trudi Musgrave	6–1, 6–4
Loss	14.	6 April 1998	Athens, Greece	Clay	(Romania) Alice Pirsu	(Italy) Alice Canepa (Italy) Tatiana Garbin	7–5, 2–6, 4–6
Loss	15.	21 June 1998	Grado, Italy	Clay	(France) Vanina Casanova	(Croatia) Marijana Kovačević (Croatia) Maja Palaveršić	6–3, 3–6, 1–6
Win	16.	6 July 1998	Fiumicino, Italy	Clay	(Italy) Alessia Lombardi	(Hungary) Adrienn Hegedűs (Japan) Tomoe Hotta	6–2, 6–4
Loss	17.	14 September 1998	Reggio di Calabria, Italy	Clay	(Italy) Elena Pioppo	(Italy) Katia Altilia (Italy) Mara Santangelo	6–7^{(3)}, 6–4, 4–6
Loss	18.	20 August 2000	Aosta, Italy	Clay	(Romania) Oana Elena Golimbioschi	(Italy) Maria Elena Camerin (Italy) Mara Santangelo	5–7, 6–4, 1–6
Loss	19.	3 September 2000	Spoleto, Italy	Clay	(Romania) Oana Elena Golimbioschi	(Italy) Maria Elena Camerin (Italy) Mara Santangelo	w/o
Loss	20.	11 September 2000	Reggio di Calabria, Italy	Clay	(Italy) Maria-Paola Zavagli	(Ukraine) Tatiana Kovalchuk (Germany) Syna Schmidle	w/o
Win	21.	1 October 2000	Verona, Italy	Clay	(Italy) Maria Elena Camerin	(Argentina) Eugenia Chialvo (Spain) Lourdes Domínguez Lino	7–6^{(4)}, 6–2
Win	22.	9 October 2000	Ciampino, Italy	Clay	(Romania) Adriana Burz	(Greece) Asimina Kaplani (Greece) Maria Pavlidou	4–2, 4–5^{(5)}, 4–2, 4–1
Loss	23.	16 October 2000	Chieti, İtaly	Clay	(Romania) Oana Elena Golimbioschi	(Argentina) Erica Krauth (Argentina) Vanesa Krauth	5–4^{(5)}, 1–4, 2–4, 1–4
Win	24.	29 January 2001	Mallorca, Spain	Clay	(Italy) Germana Di Natale	(Russia) Raissa Gourevitch (Russia) Dinara Safina	7–5, 3–6, 6–4
Loss	25.	5 February 2001	Mallorca, Spain	Clay	(Romania) Oana Elena Golimbioschi	(Spain) Rosa María Andrés Rodríguez (Russia) Dinara Safina	2–6, 0–6
Win	26.	16 April 2001	Cagliari, Italy	Clay	(Italy) Giulia Meruzzi	(Russia) Vera Zvonareva (Sweden) Aleksandra Srndovic	6–1, 6–3
Loss	27.	4 June 2001	Galatina, Italy	Clay	(Morocco) Bahia Mouhtassine	(Brazil) Vanessa Menga (Madagascar) Dally Randriantefy	6–3, 0–6, 5–7
Loss	28.	18 June 2001	Gorizia, Italy	Clay	(Ukraine) Tatiana Kovalchuk	(Czech Republic) Milena Nekvapilová (Czech Republic) Hana Šromová	7–5, 1–6, 1–6
Loss	29.	17 September 2001	Lecce, Italy	Clay	(Italy) Maria Paola Zavagli	(Spain) Mariam Ramón Climent (Germany) Angelika Rösch	6–7^{(6)}, 6–7^{(6)}
Win	30.	9 June 2002	Galatina, Italy	Clay	(Romania) Edina Gallovits-Hall	(Morocco) Bahia Mouhtassine (Austria) Sylvia Plischke	6–3, 6–2
Winner	31.	7 July 2002	Orbetello, Italy	Clay	(Estonia) Maret Ani	(Russia) Evgenia Kulikovskaya (Russia) Ekaterina Sysoeva	6–3, 1–6, 6–1
Win	32.	4 August 2002	Brindisi, Italy	Clay	(Italy) Flavia Pennetta	(Slovakia) Ľubomíra Kurhajcová (Czech Republic) Lenka Němečková	6–3, 6–2
Loss	33.	12 August 2002	Aosta, Italy	Clay	(Brazil) Maria Fernanda Alves	(Serbia and Montenegro) Katarina Mišić (Serbia and Montenegro) Dragana Zarić	5–7, 6–7^{(6)}
Win	34.	8 September 2002	Fano, Italy	Clay	(Italy) Flavia Pennetta	(Russia) Goulnara Fattakhetdinova (Belarus) Darya Kustova	7–5, 6–3
Win	35.	15 September 2002	Bordeaux, France	Clay	(Italy) Flavia Pennetta	(Australia) Sarah Stone (Australia) Samantha Stosur	6–3, 7–5
Win	36.	29 September 2002	Lecce, Italy	Clay	(Romania) Edina Gallovits-Hall	(Spain) Rosa María Andrés Rodríguez (Italy) Elisa Balsamo	6–7^{(5)}, 6–3, 6–3
Loss	37.	6 October 2002	Girona, Spain	Clay	(Italy) Flavia Pennetta	(Bulgaria) Lubomira Bacheva (Spain) Gala León García	4–6, 3–6
Loss	38.	8 June 2003	Galatina, Italy	Clay	(Morocco) Bahia Mouhtassine	(Spain) Arantxa Parra Santonja (Argentina) María Emilia Salerni	0–6, 6–7^{(6)}
Loss	39.	8 June 2003	Marseille, France	Clay	(Czech Republic) Renata Voráčová	(Ukraine) Yuliana Fedak (Russia) Galina Fokina	4–6, 7–6^{(3)}, 3–6
Loss	40.	21 September 2003	Columbus, United States	Hard	(Argentina) María Emilia Salerni	(United States) Teryn Ashley (United States) Ally Baker	3–6, 7–6^{(4)}, 2–6
Win	41.	16 May 2004	St. Gaudens, France	Clay	(Romania) Ruxandra Dragomir	(Poland) Marta Domachowska (Argentina) Natalia Gussoni	6–3, 6–1
Win	42.	23 May 2004	Caserta, Italy	Clay	(Spain) Rosa María Andrés Rodríguez	(Italy) Giulia Casoni (Czech Republic) Vladimíra Uhlířová	6–1, 4–6, 6–4
Win	43.	7 July 2004	Grado, Italy	Clay	(Spain) Rosa María Andrés Rodríguez	(Poland) Klaudia Jans (Poland) Alicja Rosolska	6–2, 6–2
Win	44.	15 June 2004	Gorizia, Italy	Carpet (i)	(Romania) Ruxandra Dragomir	(Germany) Martina Müller (Germany) Angelika Rösch	7–6^{(7)}, 6–2
Loss	45.	4 July 2004	Orbetello, Italy	Clay	(Ukraine) Yuliana Fedak	(Ukraine) Alona Bondarenko (Russia) Galina Fokina	7–6^{(5)}, 2–6, 5–7
Loss	46.	2 August 2004	Rimini, Italy	Clay	(Spain) Rosa María Andrés Rodríguez	(Ukraine) Yuliana Fedak (Ukraine) Mariya Koryttseva	6–7^{(7)}, 3–6
Win	47.	6 September 2004	Fano, Italy	Clay	(Romania) Delia Sescioreanu	(Bosnia and Herzegovina) Mervana Jugić-Salkić (Croatia) Darija Jurak	7–5, 1–6, 6–2
Loss	48.	4 April 2005	Rome, Italy	Clay	(Germany) Adriana Barna	(Italy) Alice Canepa (Italy) Emily Stellato	4–6, 0–6
Loss	49.	1 May 2005	Cagnes-sur-Mer, France	Clay	(France) Caroline Dhenin	(Germany) Sandra Klösel (Ukraine) Yuliya Beygelzimer	3–6, 6–3, 1–6
