= Tatiana Kovalchuk =

Ukrainian tennis player

- Full name: Tatiana Kovalchuk
- Country (sports): Ukraine
- Born: 24 July 1979 (age 47)
- Retired: 2010
- Prize money: $60,860

Singles
- Career record: 114-83
- Career titles: 0 WTA, 2 ITF
- Highest ranking: No. 184 (12 June 2000)

Grand Slam singles results
- French Open: 1R (2000)

Doubles
- Career record: 44-48
- Career titles: 0 WTA, 4 ITF
- Highest ranking: No. 217 (23 October 2000)

Tatiana Kovalchuk (born 24 July 1979) is a former professional tennis player from Ukraine.

== Biography ==
Kovalchuk was 16 years of age when she began playing Fed Cup tennis for Ukraine in 1996. In the same year she started on the ITF circuit and had her first tournament win at that season's $10,000 ITF event in Donetsk. She had a win over Anastasia Myskina in the qualifying draw of a tournament on the ITF circuit in 1998. Her biggest title came in 1999, the $25,000 ITF tournament in Reggio Calabria.

In 2000 she competed in the main draw of WTA Tour tournaments at Antwerp and Tashkent, both in the singles and doubles draws. She was beaten in the first round of the singles at both events but was a doubles quarter-finalist in Antwerp's Belgian Open.

Most notably she competed in the main draw of the women's singles at the 2000 French Open. She made it through the qualifying competition by beating Yuka Yoshida, Conchita Martínez Granados and Gréta Arn, then lost to Anne Kremer in the first round. This brought her world ranking to a career high 184 in the world.

She made the last of her 11 Fed Cup tie appearances in 2001, ending her representative career by beating Estonia's Kaia Kanepi.

== ITF finals ==
Legend
$25,000 tournaments
$10,000 tournaments

=== Singles (2–2) ===
Result	No.	Date	Tournament	Surface	Opponent	Score
Win	1.	8 September 1996	Donetsk, Ukraine	Clay	(Belarus) Tatiana Poutchek	7–5, 1–0 ret.
Loss	2.	21 September 1997	Cluj, Romania	Clay	(Romania) Mira Radu	7-6, 0-6, 1-6
Loss	3.	26 April 1999	Maglie, Italy	Clay	(France) Aurélie Védy	3–6, 2–6
Win	4.	19 September 1999	Reggio Calabria, Italy	Clay	(Italy) Alice Canepa	6-3, 2-6, 6-2

=== Doubles (4–3) ===
Result	No.	Date	Tournament	Surface	Partner	Opponents	Score
Win	1.	15 September 1997	Cluj, Romania	Clay	(Ukraine) Anna Zaporozhanova	(Germany) Adriana Barna (Romania) Magda Mihalache	6–4, 5–7, 6–3
Loss	2.	9 May 1998	Prešov, Slovakia	Clay	(Ukraine) Anna Zaporozhanova	(Czech Republic) Magdalena Zděnovcová (Czech Republic) Jana Lubasová	2–6, 4–6
Loss	3.	17 May 1998	Nitra, Slovakia	Clay	(Ukraine) Anna Zaporozhanova	(Slovakia) Patrícia Marková (Slovakia) Silvia Uricková	0–6, 3–6
Win	4.	13 July 1998	Kharkiv, Ukraine	Clay	(Belarus) Nadejda Ostrovskaya	(Ukraine) Natalia Bondarenko (Ukraine) Natalia Nemchinova	6–1, 3–6, 6–1
Win	5.	17 September 2000	Reggio Calabria, Italy	Clay	(Germany) Syna Schreiber	(Romania) Andreea Vanc (Italy) Maria Paola Zavagli	w/o
Loss	6.	18 June 2001	Gorizia, Italy	Clay	(Romania) Andreea Vanc	(Czech Republic) Milena Nekvapilová (Czech Republic) Hana Šromová	7–5, 1–6, 1–6
Win	7.	26 May 2002	Kyiv, Ukraine	Clay	(Ukraine) Anna Zaporozhanova	(Belarus) Darya Kustova (Poland) Magdalena Marszałek	6–2, 6–3
