= Syna Schreiber =

German tennis player

- Full name: Syna Schreiber Schmidle
- Country (sports): Germany
- Born: 20 November 1978 (age 47) Freiburg, West Germany
- Plays: Left-handed
- Prize money: $132,740

Singles
- Career record: 207–199
- Career titles: 3 ITF
- Highest ranking: No. 152 (17 November 1997)

Doubles
- Career record: 100–82
- Career titles: 9 ITF
- Highest ranking: No. 138 (2 October 2000)

Grand Slam doubles results
- US Open: 1R (2000)

Syna Schreiber (born 20 November 1978) is a former professional tennis player from Germany. Up until her marriage in 2003, she competed under her maiden name Syna Schmidle.

== Biography ==
Schreiber was born in Freiburg im Breisgau, the daughter of tennis instructor Wolfram, who began teaching her when she was four.

Aged 14 she received a wildcard into the main draw of a WTA tournament in Leipzig and played her first tour match against Steffi Graf.

In 1997, she won a $25k tournament in Flensburg, and that year reached her career-high ranking of 152 in the world.

As a doubles player, she made WTA Tour semifinals at the 1999 Bol Ladies Open with Barbara Schwartz, and Palermo in 2001, partnering Antonella Serra Zanetti. She won eight doubles titles on the ITF Women's Circuit.

She had her only Grand Slam main-draw appearance at the 2000 US Open, as a qualifier in the women's doubles with Maja Matevžič.

== ITF finals ==
$25,000 tournaments
$15,000 tournaments
$10,000 tournaments

=== Singles: 9 (3–6) ===
Result	No.	Date	Tournament	Surface	Opponent	Score
Loss	1.	31 January 1994	Rungsted, Denmark	Carpet (i)	(Latvia) Oksana Bushevitsa	6–2, 6–7, 5–7
Win	2.	27 May 1996	Barcelona, Spain	Clay	(Spain) Ana Alcázar	6–3, 6–2
Loss	3.	27 July 1997	Rostock, Germany	Clay	(Germany) Silke Meier	3–6, 5–7
Win	4.	19 October, 1997	Flensburg, Germany	Carpet (i)	(Czech Republic) Květa Hrdličková	6–4, 6–4
Loss	5.	25 June 2000	Sopot, Poland	Clay	(Czech Republic) Klára Koukalová	6–7^{(7–9)}, 3–6
Loss	6.	13 August 2000	Hechingen, Germany	Clay	(Germany) Susi Lohrmann	3–6, 6–1, 3–6
Loss	7.	14 May 2001	Edinburgh, Scotland	Clay	(Hungary) Zsófia Gubacsi	4–6, 4–6
Loss	8.	3 March 2002	Sunderland, England	Carpet (i)	(Sweden) Sofia Arvidsson	6–7, 5–3 ret.
Win	9.	23 March 2003	Amiens, France	Clay (i)	(Netherlands) Kim Kilsdonk	7–6^{(7–5)}, 6–2

=== Doubles: 16 (9–7) ===
Result	No.	Date	Tournament	Surface	Partner	Opponents	Score
Win	1.	5 August 1996	Budapest, Hungary	Clay	(Germany) Fruzsina Siklosi	(Czech Republic) Květa Hrdličková (Czech Republic) Jana Macurová	6–2, 6–1
Loss	2.	28 October 1996	Edinburgh, Scotland	Hard	(Dominican Republic) Joelle Schad	(United Kingdom) Julie Pullin (United Kingdom) Lorna Woodroffe	3–6, 4–6
Win	3.	16 February 1997	Cali, Colombia	Clay	(Australia) Rachel McQuillan	(Portugal) Sofia Prazeres (Paraguay) Larissa Schaerer	6–2, 6–3
Loss	4.	15 June 1998	Sopot, Poland	Clay	(Germany) Marketa Kochta	(Hungary) Rita Kuti-Kis (Hungary) Anna Földényi	1–6, 6–7^{(4–7)}
Loss	5.	18 July 1999	Puchheim, Germany	Clay	(Germany) Kirstin Freye	(Bulgaria) Svetlana Krivencheva (Czech Republic) Eva Melicharová	2–6, 4–6
Loss	6.	19 September 1999	Otočec, Slovenia	Clay	(Austria) Melanie Schnell	(Slovakia) Ľudmila Cervanová (Slovakia) Andrea Šebová	3–6, 4–6
Win	7.	14 November 1999	Rungsted, Denmark	Carpet (i)	(Germany) Marketa Kochta	(Germany) Mia Buric (Germany) Jasmin Wöhr	6–4, 7–6, 6–2
Win	8.	9 April 2000	Dinan, France	Clay	(Germany) Vanessa Henke	(France) Stéphanie Foretz (Belgium) Patty Van Acker	6–7^{(2–7)}, 6–4, 6–2
Win	9.	17 September 2000	Reggio Calabria, Italy	Clay	(Ukraine) Tatiana Kovalchuk	(Romania) Andreea Vanc (Italy) Maria Paola Zavagli	w/o
Loss	10.	24 September 2000	Mallorca, Spain	Clay	(Germany) Angelika Rösch	(Spain) Eva Bes (Spain) Alicia Ortuño	4–6, 0–6
Loss	11.	30 October 2000	Kingston upon Hull, England	Hard (i)	(Germany) Mia Buric	(United Kingdom) Julie Pullin (United Kingdom) Lorna Woodroffe	1–4, 4–1, 1–4, 4–5^{(4–7)}
Loss	12.	15 April 2001	Dinan, France	Clay	(Germany) Vanessa Henke	(Greece) Eleni Daniilidou (Germany) Caroline Schneider	3–6, 6–7
Win	13.	22 April 2001	Gelos, France	Clay	(Germany) Vanessa Henke	(Spain) Eva Bes (Spain) Lourdes Domínguez Lino	6–2, 6–3
Win	14.	3 February 2002	Belfort, France	Hard (i)	(Germany) Kirstin Freye	(France) Marina Caiazzo (France) Sophie Lefèvre	7–6^{(7–0)}, 6–4
Win	15.	23 February 2003	Buchen, Germany	Carpet (i)	(Romania) Magda Mihalache	(Belgium) Leslie Butkiewicz (Netherlands) Kim Kilsdonk	6–2, 6–3
Win	16.	7 April 2018	Antalya, Turkey	Clay	(Germany) Lisa-Marie Maetschke	(Bulgaria) Petia Arshinkova (Bulgaria) Gebriela Mihaylova	6–3, 6–1
