= Angelika Rösch =

German tennis player

- ITF name: Angelika Roesch
- Country (sports): Germany
- Born: 8 June 1977 (age 48) East Berlin, East Germany
- Height: 1.72 m (5 ft 7 1/2 in)
- Turned pro: 1996
- Retired: 2010
- Plays: Right-handed (two handed backhand)
- Prize money: $371,951

Singles
- Career record: 347–363
- Career titles: 5 ITF
- Highest ranking: No. 69 (24 February 2003)

Grand Slam singles results
- Australian Open: 1R (2003)
- French Open: 1R (2003)
- Wimbledon: 1R (2002, 2003)
- US Open: 1R (2002, 2003)

Doubles
- Career record: 125–147
- Career titles: 6 ITF
- Highest ranking: No. 107 (17 March 2003)

Angelika Rösch (born 8 June 1977) is a former professional tennis player from Germany. She reached her career-high ranking in singles of No. 69 in the world on 24 February 2003, and retired from tennis in 2010.

Rösch turned professional in 1996 and spent several years in mostly ITF Women's Circuit events before enjoying her best year in 2002, reaching the top 100 and making her Grand Slam debut at Wimbledon. She also won against Elena Dementieva three times during that season, with Dementieva being ranked in the top 20 in all three of the meetings. She went on to play in all four Grand Slams during 2003 but failed to advance past the first round in any of them.

== WTA career finals ==
=== Doubles: 1 (runner-up) ===
Result	Date	Tournament	Surface	Partnering	Opponents	Score
Loss	13 July 2002	Palermo Ladies Open, Italy	Clay	(Bulgaria) Lubomira Bacheva	(Russia) Evgenia Kulikovskaya (Russia) Ekaterina Sysoeva	4–6, 3–6

== ITF finals ==
Legend
$100,000 tournaments
$75,000 tournaments
$50,000 tournaments
$25,000 tournaments
$10,000 tournaments

=== Singles (5–5) ===
Result	No.	Date	Tournament	Surface	Opponent	Score
Win	1.	3 December 1995	São Paulo, Brazil	Hard	(Germany) Sabine Haas	6–1, 5–7, 6–2
Win	2.	6 September 1998	Hechingen, Germany	Clay	(Czech Republic) Olga Vymetálková	6–4, 5–7, 7–5
Loss	3.	19 September 1999	Otocec, Slovenia	Clay	(Spain) Marta Marrero	2–6, 1–6
Loss	4.	27 August 2000	Maribor, Slovenia	Clay	(Czech Republic) Klára Zakopalová	5–7, 4–6
Loss	5.	1 July 2001	Mont-de-Marsan, France	Clay	(France) Céline Beigbeder	1–6, 1–6
Win	6.	30 September 2001	Verona, Italy	Clay	(Slovakia) Zuzana Kučová	6–4, 6–0
Loss	7.	7 October 2001	Girona, Spain	Clay	(Spain) Anabel Medina Garrigues	4–6, 4–6
Win	8.	21 April 2007	Bari, Italy	Clay	(Italy) Giulia Gabba	6–4, 6–7^{(3)}, 7–5
Loss	9.	10 June 2007	Grado, Italy	Clay	(Belarus) Darya Kustova	2–6, 6–3, 2–6
Win	10.	28 September 2008	Lecce, Italy	Clay	(Bosnia and Herzegovina) Mervana Jugić-Salkić	6–2, 6–7^{(5)}, 7–5

=== Doubles (6–7) ===
Result	No.	Date	Tournament	Surface	Partnering	Opponents	Score
Loss	1.	20 August 1995	Wahlscheid, Germany	Clay	(Ukraine) Tanja Tsiganii	(Czech Republic) Sylva Nesvadbová (Czech Republic) Milena Nekvapilová	6–2, 4–6, 4–6
Loss	2.	2 August 1997	Les Contamines, France	Hard	(Germany) Eva Belbl	(France) Emmanuelle Curutchet (France) Sophie Georges	2–6, 1–6
Loss	3.	8 February 1998	Mallorca, Spain	Clay	(Germany) Eva Belbl	(Italy) Katia Altilia (Italy) Alice Canepa	5–7, 6–7
Win	1.	13 August 2000	Hechingen, Germany	Clay	(Brazil) Miriam D'Agostini	(South Africa) Natalie Grandin (South Africa) Nicole Rencken	7–6^{(3)}, 6–2
Win	2.	26 August 2000	Maribor, Slovenia	Clay	(Germany) Jasmin Wöhr	(Argentina) Vanesa Krauth (Switzerland) Aliénor Tricerri	6–4, 4–6, 7–6^{(1)}
Loss	4.	24 September 2000	Lecce, Italy	Clay	(Germany) Syna Schmidle	(Spain) Eva Bes (Spain) Alicia Ortuño	4–6, 0–6
Win	3.	22 September 2001	Lecce, Italy	Clay	(Spain) Mariam Ramón Climent	(Romania) Andreea Ehritt-Vanc (Italy) Maria Paola Zavagli	7–6^{(5)}, 7–6^{(6)}
Win	4.	6 July 2003	Stuttgart-Vaihingen, Germany	Clay	(Germany) Antonia Matic	(Bulgaria) Maria Geznenge (Serbia and Montenegro) Dragana Zarić	6–1, 7–6^{(2)}
Loss	5.	8 February 2004	Ortisei, Italy	Carpet (i)	(Bulgaria) Lubomira Bacheva	(Czech Republic) Olga Vymetálková (Czech Republic) Gabriela Navrátilová	1–6, 3–6
Loss	6.	19 June 2004	Gorizia, Italy	Carpet (i)	(Germany) Martina Müller	(Romania) Ruxandra Dragomir (Romania) Andreea Ehritt-Vanc	6–7^{(4)}, 2–6
Win	5.	16 October 2004	Joué-lès-Tours, France	Carpet (i)	(Czech Republic) Květa Peschke	(France) Stéphanie Cohen-Aloro (Tunisia) Selima Sfar	w/o
Win	6.	17 March 2006	Fuerteventura, Spain	Hard	(Ukraine) Yuliya Beygelzimer	(Germany) Angelika Bachmann (Germany) Kristina Barrois	6–3, 6–7^{(5)}, 6–4
Loss	7.	18 February 2007	Saguenay, Canada	Hard (i)	(Germany) Sabine Klaschka	(Germany) Angelique Kerber (Romania) Ágnes Szatmári	1–6, 4–6
