= Laura Dell'Angelo =

Italian tennis player

- Country (sports): Italy
- Born: 17 May 1981 (age 44); Munich, West Germany
- Prize money: $75,565

Singles
- Career record: 153–145
- Career titles: 3 ITF
- Highest ranking: No. 175 (19 June 2000)

Doubles
- Career record: 47–74
- Career titles: 3 ITF
- Highest ranking: No. 245 (8 September 2003)

Laura Dell'Angelo (born 17 May 1981) is an Italian former professional tennis player.

== Biography ==
Dell'Angelo was born in Munich, to a German mother and Italian father.

On the professional tour, she reached a best ranking of 175 in the world. She won three ITF singles titles, including a $25k tournament in Orbetello in 1999, beating Anastasia Myskina in the final. In 2000, she featured in the qualifying draw of all four Grand Slam events.

As a doubles player, Dell'Angelo had a best ranking of 245 and was a quarterfinalist at Helsinki in 2003.

== ITF Circuit finals ==
Legend
$50,000 tournaments
$25,000 tournaments
$10,000 tournaments

=== Singles (3–3) ===
Result	No.	Date	Tournament	Surface	Opponent	Score
Loss	1.	11 August 1997	ITF Catania, Italy	Clay	(Italy) Maria Paola Zavagli	7–5, 6–7^{(1)}, 3–6
Win	1.	16 August 1998	ITF Alghero, Italy	Hard	(Japan) Ryoko Takemura	6–2, 7–5
Loss	2.	13 September 1998	ITF Fano, Italy	Clay	(Spain) Lourdes Domínguez Lino	1–6, 1–6
Loss	3.	9 November 1998	ITF Suzano, Brazil	Clay	(Romania) Andreea Ehritt-Vanc	4–6, 3–6
Win	2.	4 July 1999	ITF Orbetello, Italy	Clay	(Russia) Anastasia Myskina	6–3, 7–6^{(8)}
Win	3.	21 April 2002	ITF Cagliari, Italy	Clay	(Georgia (country)) Margalita Chakhnashvili	6–3, 7–6^{(4)}

=== Doubles: 9 (3–6) ===
Outcome	No.	Date	Tournament	Surface	Partner	Opponents	Score
Winner	1.	21 April 1997	ITF San Severo, Italy	Clay	(Italy) Sabina Da Ponte	(Italy) Maria-Paola Zavagli (Romania) Andreea Ehritt-Vanc	6–4, 4–6, 6–4
Runner-up	1.	26 May 1997	ITF Salzburg, Austria	Clay (i)	(Italy) Tathiana Garbin	(Italy) Caroline Schneider (Austria) Patricia Wartusch	6–1, 3–6, 3–6
Runner-up	2.	16 August 1998	ITF Alghero, Italy	Hard	(Italy) Mara Santangelo	(Italy) Alessia Lombardi (Italy) Elena Pioppo	6–3, 2–6, 4–6
Winner	2.	7 September 1998	ITF Fano, Italy	Clay	(Spain) Lourdes Domínguez Lino	(Slovakia) Patrícia Marková (Slovenia) Petra Rampre	7–6, 2–6, 6–3
Runner-up	3.	15 November 1998	ITF Suzano, Brazil	Clay	(Italy) Antonella Serra Zanetti	(Slovakia) Andrea Šebová (Slovakia) Silvia Uríčková	6–3, 2–6, 4–6
Runner-up	4.	16 October 2000	Open de Touraine, France	Hard (i)	(Germany) Mia Buric	(Greece) Eleni Daniilidou (Bulgaria) Maria Geznenge	3–5, 1–4, 0–4
Runner-up	5.	15 September 2002	ITF Sofia, Bulgaria	Clay	(Italy) Nathalie Viérin	(Russia) Vera Dushevina (Kazakhstan) Galina Voskoboeva	6–3, 4–6, 2–6
Runner-up	6.	9 June 2003	Grado Tennis Cup, Italy	Clay	(Italy) Giorgia Mortello	(Bosnia and Herzegovina) Mervana Jugić-Salkić (Croatia) Darija Jurak	6–2, 3–6, 0–6
Winner	3.	5 October 2003	ITF Porto, Portugal	Clay	(Austria) Sybille Bammer	(Czech Republic) Iveta Gerlová (Canada) Marie-Ève Pelletier	6–3, 7–5
