= Mariana Díaz Oliva =

Argentine tennis player

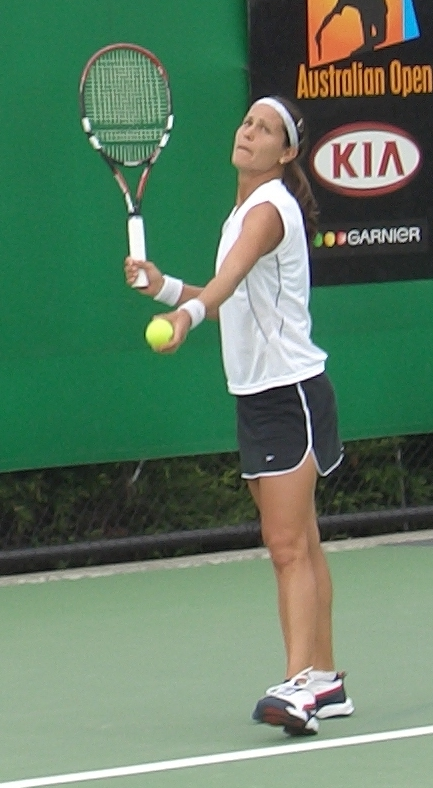
- Country (sports): Argentina
- Born: 11 March 1976 (age 50) Buenos Aires, Argentina
- Height: 1.72 m (5 ft 7 1/2 in)
- Turned pro: 1992
- Retired: 2006
- Plays: Right-handed (two-handed backhand)
- Prize money: $1,009,342

Singles
- Career record: 382–291
- Career titles: 1 WTA, 16 ITF
- Highest ranking: No. 42 (9 July 2001)

Grand Slam singles results
- Australian Open: 3R (2005)
- French Open: 3R (1998)
- Wimbledon: 2R (1998, 1999, 2005)
- US Open: 2R (2005)

Doubles
- Career record: 145–143
- Career titles: 15 ITF
- Highest ranking: No. 93 (10 September 2001)

Team competitions
- Fed Cup: 19–14
Medal record
Pan American Games
Bronze medal – third place	Winnipeg 1999	Women's singles
Bronze medal – third place	Winnipeg 1999	Women's doubles

Mariana Díaz Oliva (born 11 March 1976) is a former professional tennis player from Argentina.

She played professionally from September 1992 until 12 October 2006. Her highest ranks were world No. 42 for singles and No. 93 for doubles, both achieved in 2001. At the 2001 Bol Open, she defeated Kim Clijsters to reach the final, where she lost to Ángeles Montolio. In 2002, she won the Internazionali Femminili di Palermo. In 2003, she also reached the Mexican Open singles final.

== WTA Tour finals ==
=== Singles: 3 (1 title, 2 runner-ups) ===
Legend
Tier I (0–0)
Tier II (0–0)
Tier III, IV & V (1–2)

Result	Date	Tournament	Surface	Opponent	Score
Loss	May 2001	Bol Open, Croatia	Clay	(Spain) Ángeles Montolio	6–3, 2–6, 5–7
Win	Jul 2002	Palermo Open, Italy	Clay	(Russia) Vera Zvonareva	6–7^{(6–8)}, 6–1, 6–3
Loss	Mar 2003	Mexican Open	Clay	(South Africa) Amanda Coetzer	5–7, 3–6

=== Doubles: 2 (runner-ups) ===
Legend
Tier I (0–0)
Tier II (0–0)
Tier III, IV & V (0–2)

Result	Date	Tournament	Surface	Partner	Opponents	Score
Loss	Oct 2006	Korea Open, South Korea	Hard	(Chinese Taipei) Chuang Chia-jung	(Spain) Virginia Ruano Pascual (Argentina) Paola Suárez	2–6, 3–6
Loss	Oct 2006	Bangkok Open, Thailand	Hard	(South Africa) Natalie Grandin	(United States) Vania King (Croatia) Jelena Kostanić	5–7, 6–2, 5–7

== ITF finals ==
Legend
$75,000 tournaments
$50,000 tournaments
$25,000 tournaments
$10,000 tournaments

=== Singles: 27 (16–11) ===
Result	No.	Date	Tournament	Surface	Opponent	Score
Win	1.	19 October 1992	ITF Buenos Aires, Argentina	Clay	(Brazil) Cláudia Chabalgoity	6–4, 2–6, 6–2
Win	2.	2 August 1993	ITF Dublin, Ireland	Clay	(France) Vanina Casanova	6–4, 6–3
Win	3.	9 August 1993	ITF Rebecq, Belgium	Clay	(Italy) Stefania Pifferi	0–6, 6–4, 6–1
Win	4.	16 August 1993	ITF Koksijde, Belgium	Clay	(Belgium) Stephanie Devillé	6–1, 6–3
Loss	5.	18 October 1993	ITF Buenos Aires, Argentina	Clay	(Argentina) Laura Montalvo	2–6, 4–6
Loss	6.	1 November 1993	ITF Belo Horizonte, Brazil	Clay	(Sweden) Maria-Farnes Capistrano	4–6, 6–1, 6–7^{(6)}
Win	7.	4 September 1995	ITF Medellín, Colombia	Clay	(Brazil) Eugenia Maia	6–4, 6–1
Win	8.	11 September 1995	ITF Bucaramanga, Colombia	Clay	(Germany) Nina Nittinger	7–5, 6–2
Loss	9.	18 September 1995	ITF Manizales, Colombia	Clay	(Colombia) Carmiña Giraldo	3–6, 4–6
Win	10.	25 September 1995	ITF Guayaquil, Ecuador	Clay	(Argentina) Paula Rosado	6–0, 6–2
Loss	11.	16 October 1995	ITF Asunción, Paraguay	Clay	(Paraguay) Larissa Schaerer	2–6, 1–6
Win	12.	23 October 1995	ITF Buenos Aires, Argentina	Clay	(Argentina) Paola Suárez	2–6, 6–4, 6–3
Win	13.	6 November 1995	ITF São Paulo, Brazil	Clay	(Argentina) Laura Montalvo	6–3, 6–1
Win	14.	28 July 1996	ITF Buenos Aires, Argentina	Clay	(Argentina) María Fernanda Landa	6–3, 7–6^{(5)}
Loss	15.	25 August 1996	ITF Athens, Greece	Clay	(Spain) Magüi Serna	7–5, 3–6, 2–6
Loss	16.	29 September 1996	ITF Bucharest, Romania	Clay	(Romania) Cătălina Cristea	5–7, 6–3, 6–7^{(1)}
Win	17.	10 November 1996	ITF São Paulo, Brazil	Clay	(Brazil) Andrea Vieira	7–5, 6–3
Loss	18.	15 June 1997	ITF Budapest, Hungary	Clay	(Spain) Gala León García	5–7, 2–6
Win	19.	28 September 1997	ITF San Miguel de Tucumán, Argentina	Clay	(Argentina) Laura Montalvo	6–2, 6–7^{(3)}, 7–6^{(0)}
Win	20.	2 November 1997	ITF Mogi das Cruzes, Brazil	Clay	(Spain) Conchita Martínez Granados	6–0, 6–0
Loss	21.	5 July 1998	ITF Orbetello, Italy	Clay	(Colombia) Fabiola Zuluaga	1–6, 6–7
Loss	22.	11 July 1999	ITF Civitanova, Italy	Clay	(Italy) Tatiana Garbin	4–6, 6–4, 1–6
Win	23.	1 October 2000	ITF Tbilisi, Georgia	Clay	(Russia) Maria Goloviznina	3–6, 6–2, 6–2
Loss	24.	9 June 2002	ITF Caserta, Italy	Clay	(Czech Republic) Klára Koukalová	6–7^{(4)}, 7–5, 5–7
Win	25.	4 August 2002	Open Saint-Gaudens, France	Clay	(Slovenia) Maja Matevžič	6–4, 6–1
Win	26.	21 November 2004	ITF Puebla, Mexico	Hard	(France) Mathilde Johansson	6–3, 6–1
Loss	27.	28 November 2004	ITF San Luis Potosí, Mexico	Hard	(Hungary) Melinda Czink	0–6, 7–5, 3–6

=== Doubles: 23 (15–8) ===
Result	No.	Date	Tournament	Surface	Partner	Opponents	Score
Win	1.	2 August 1993	ITF Dublin, Ireland	Clay	(Argentina) Valentina Solari	(France) Vanina Casanova (Italy) Germana di Natale	4–6, 6–3, 6–2
Loss	2.	9 August 1993	ITF Rebecq, Belgium	Clay	(Argentina) Valentina Solari	(Israel) Nelly Barkan (Ukraine) Olga Lugina	1–6, 6–7^{(1)}
Win	3.	18 October 1993	ITF Buenos Aires, Argentina	Clay	(Argentina) Laura Montalvo	(Argentina) Valeria Strappa (Argentina) Veronica Stele	6–2, 5–7, 6–1
Win	4.	1 November 1993	ITF Asunción, Paraguay	Clay	(Argentina) Valentina Solari	(Paraguay) Magalí Benítez (Paraguay) Larissa Schaerer	7–5, 7–5
Win	5.	8 November 1993	ITF Belo Horizonte, Brazil	Clay	(Argentina) Valeria Strappa	(Brazil) Renata Brito (Brazil) Patrícia Segala	6–4, 6–1
Win	6.	4 September 1995	ITF Medellín, Colombia	Clay	(Brazil) Eugenia Maia	(United Kingdom) Joanne Moore (Colombia) Ximena Rodríguez	6–3, 6–2
Win	7.	18 September 1995	ITF Manizales, Colombia	Clay	(Brazil) Eugenia Maia	(United Kingdom) Joanne Moore (Colombia) Ximena Rodríguez	6–4, 6–3
Loss	8.	25 September 1995	ITF Guayaquil, Ecuador	Clay	(Brazil) Eugenia Maia	(Chile) Bárbara Castro (Chile) María-Alejandra Quezada	6–7^{(5)}, 1–6
Loss	9.	23 October 1995	ITF Buenos Aires, Argentina	Clay	(Argentina) Mariana Lopez Palacios	(Argentina) Paola Suárez (Argentina) Cintia Tortorella	2–6, 2–6
Win	10.	10 November 1996	ITF São Paulo, Brazil	Clay	(Paraguay) Larissa Schaerer	(Brazil) Miriam D'Agostini (Brazil) Andrea Vieira	3–6, 6–4, 6–2
Win	11.	13 June 1999	ITF Galatina, İtaly	Clay	(Argentina) Erica Krauth	(Italy) Giulia Casoni (Italy) Maria Paola Zavagli	6–1, 6–3
Win	12.	4 July 1999	ITF Orbetello, Italy	Clay	(Argentina) Clarisa Fernández	(Russia) Maria Goloviznina (Russia) Anastasia Myskina	6–4, 6–2
Win	13.	14 November 1999	ITF Monterrey, Mexico	Hard	(Paraguay) Rossana de los Ríos	(Italy) Alice Canepa (Argentina) Clarisa Fernández	4–6, 7–6^{(6)}, 6–3
Loss	14.	2 April 2000	ITF Amiens, France	Clay (i)	(Switzerland) Aliénor Tricerri	(Romania) Magda Mihalache (Slovakia) Zuzana Váleková	2–6, 4–6
Win	15.	11 June 2000	ITF Galatina, Italy	Clay	(Italy) Alice Canepa	(Brazil) Miriam D'Agostini (Brazil) Joana Cortez	6–4, 4–6, 6–4
Win	16.	18 June 2000	Open de Marseille, France	Clay	(Italy) Alice Canepa	(Poland) Anna Bieleń-Żarska (Bulgaria) Svetlana Krivencheva	6–2, 6–3
Loss	17.	6 August 2000	ITF Ettenheim, Germany	Hard	(Argentina) María Emilia Salerni	(Belarus) Nadejda Ostrovskaya (Ukraine) Anna Zaporozhanova	4–6, 2–6
Loss	18.	10 September 2000	Open Denain, France	Clay	(Russia) Elena Bovina	(Spain) Lourdes Domínguez Lino (Spain) María José Martínez Sánchez	4–6, 0–6
Win	19.	30 September 2000	ITF Tbilisi, Georgia	Clay	(Italy) Mara Santangelo	(Netherlands) Jolanda Mens (Slovakia) Alena Paulenková	4–6, 6–3, 6–2
Loss	20.	8 October 2000	Batumi Ladies Open, Georgia	Carpet (i)	(Denmark) Eva Dyrberg	(Ukraine) Tatiana Perebiynis (Belarus) Tatiana Poutchek	4–1, 2–4, 1–4, 2–4
Win	21.	10 December 2000	ITF Bogotá, Colombia	Hard	(Brazil) Joana Cortez	(Argentina) Clarisa Fernández (Spain) Conchita Martínez Granados	3–6, 6–1, 6–2
Loss	22.	14 October 2002	ITF Cardiff, United States	Hard (i)	(United Kingdom) Julie Pullin	(France) Marion Bartoli (Canada) Vanessa Webb	4–6, 2–6
Win	23.	8 February 2004	ITF Rockford, United States	Hard (i)	(Argentina) Gisela Dulko	(New Zealand) Leanne Baker (Italy) Francesca Lubiani	6–7^{(5)}, 6–3, 6–1
