= Bianka Lamade =

German tennis player

- Country (sports): Germany
- Born: 30 August 1982 (age 43) Leonberg, West Germany
- Height: 1.84 m (6 ft 0 in)
- Retired: 2004
- Plays: Right-handed
- Prize money: $314,804

Singles
- Career record: 92–87
- Career titles: 1 WTA, 3 ITF
- Highest ranking: No. 59 (9 July 2001)

Grand Slam singles results
- Australian Open: 2R (2002)
- French Open: 1R (2001, 2002)
- Wimbledon: 2R (2001)
- US Open: 1R (2001)

Doubles
- Career record: 66–60
- Career titles: 6 ITF
- Highest ranking: No. 60 (23 July 2001)

Grand Slam doubles results
- Australian Open: 1R (2001, 2002)
- French Open: 2R (2001–2003)
- Wimbledon: 2R (2001)
- US Open: 1R (2001, 2003)

Bianka Lamade (born 30 August 1982) is a former tennis player from Germany.

She turned professional in January 2000 at the age of 17. After just one year of playing on the tour, she had gone up to No. 127 in the world. As the world No. 534 in her main-draw debut, she upset world No. 26 Sabine Appelmans. In 2001, she won her first and only WTA Tour title at the Tashkent Open, where she defeated Seda Noorlander in the final. Her ranking rose to No. 59 with these results, which is her career-high ranking. She also reached two doubles finals, at 's-Hertogenbosch in 2002 and Luxembourg in 2001 with Magdalena Maleeva and Patty Schnyder.

She was a member of the German Fed Cup team in both 2001 and 2002. She played six matches in these ties, winning only one against Alicia Molik of Australia.

== WTA career finals ==
=== Singles (1–0) ===
Legend (singles)
Grand Slam (0)
Tier I (0)
Tier II (0)
Tier III (0)
Tier IV / V (1)

Result	Date	Tournament	Surface	Opponent	Score
Win	Jun 2001	Tashkent Open	Hard	(Netherlands) Seda Noorlander	6–3, 2–6, 6–2

=== Doubles (0–2) ===
Result	Date	Tournament	Surface	Partner	Opponents	Score
Loss	Oct 2001	Luxembourg Open	Hard (i)	(Switzerland) Patty Schnyder	(Russia) Elena Bovina (Slovakia) Daniela Hantuchová	3–6, 3–6
Loss	Jun 2002	Rosmalen Open, Netherlands	Grass	(Bulgaria) Magdalena Maleeva	(Australia) Catherine Barclay (Germany) Martina Müller	4–6, 5–7

== ITF finals ==
Legend
$75,000 tournaments
$50,000 tournaments
$25,000 tournaments
$10,000 tournaments

=== Singles (3–1) ===
Result	No.	Date	Tournament	Surface	Opponent	Score
Win	1.	17 July 2000	Le Touquet, France	Clay	(Tunisia) Selima Sfar	7–5, 6–4
Win	2.	24 July 2000	Les Contamines, France	Hard	(Madagascar) Dally Randriantefy	6–2, 6–1
Win	3.	9 February 2003	Midland, United States	Hard (i)	(United States) Laura Granville	6–3, 1–6, 6–4
Loss	4.	28 July 2003	Pétange, Luxembourg	Clay	(Germany) Angelika Bachmann	4–6, 6–7^{(7–9)}

=== Doubles (6–1) ===
Result	No.	Date	Tournament	Surface	Partner	Opponents	Score
Win	1.	12 June 2000	Lenzerheide, Switzerland	Clay	(Germany) Mia Buric	(Netherlands) Yvette Basting (Netherlands) Andrea van den Hurk	7–5, 6–3
Win	2.	17 July 2000	Le Touquet, France	Clay	(Germany) Jasmin Wöhr	(Argentina) Eugenia Chialvo (Spain) Lourdes Domínguez Lino	6–3, 7–5
Win	3.	30 July 2000	Les Contamines, France	Hard	(France) Caroline Dhenin	(France) Carine Bornu (Netherlands) Kim de Weille	6–7^{(4)}, 6–4, 6–4
Win	4.	27 July 2003	Les Contamines, France	Hard	(France) Caroline Dhenin	(France) Kildine Chevalier (Ukraine) Alexandra Kravets	6–4, 6–2
Loss	5.	28 July 2003	Pétange, Luxembourg	Clay	(Germany) Nicole Ludwig	(Czech Republic) Iveta Gerlová (Slovakia) Andrea Masaryková	2–6, 7–5, 6–7^{(1)}
Win	6.	12 October 2003	Joué-lès-Tours, France	Hard (i)	(Latvia) Līga Dekmeijere	(Belgium) Leslie Butkiewicz (Belgium) Caroline Maes	6–1, 6–2
Win	7.	2 November 2003	Poitiers, France	Hard (i)	(France) Caroline Dhenin	(Ukraine) Yuliya Beygelzimer (Belarus) Tatiana Poutchek	7–5, 6–2
