= Lubomira Bacheva =

Bulgarian tennis player

Lubomira Bacheva Любомира Бачева
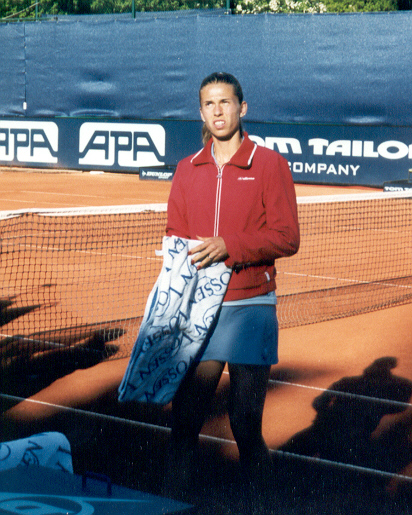
- Country (sports): Bulgaria
- Residence: Sofia, Bulgaria
- Born: 7 March 1975 (age 51) Sofia
- Turned pro: 1990
- Retired: 2004
- Plays: Right-handed
- Prize money: US$ 534,838

Singles
- Career record: 381–275
- Career titles: 0 WTA, 9 ITF
- Highest ranking: No. 68 (1 November 1999)

Grand Slam singles results
- Australian Open: 1R (2000, 2001)
- French Open: 2R (1999)
- Wimbledon: 2R (2000)
- US Open: 2R (2000)

Doubles
- Career record: 179–150
- Career titles: 2 WTA, 11 ITF
- Highest ranking: No. 53 (16 April 2001)

Grand Slam doubles results
- Australian Open: 1R (2001, 2002)
- French Open: 1R (2000, 2001, 2002, 2003, 2004)
- Wimbledon: 1R (2000, 2001, 2004)
- US Open: 2R (2000)

Team competitions
- Fed Cup: 1–6 (singles 0–4, doubles 1-2)

Lubomira Bacheva (Bulgarian: Любомира Бачева, born 7 March 1975) is a retired tennis player from Bulgaria. She reached her career-high ranking of world No. 68 on 1 November 1999.

== Tennis career ==
As a junior, Bacheva won the European Championships in 1989 and 1991.

Bacheva turned professional in 1990 and spent several years on the ITF Women's Circuit building up her ranking. In 1999, she finally broke through the top 100 and reached her first WTA Tour semifinal at the Estoril Open as a lucky loser. She finished that year at No. 73. She finished 2000 again in the top 100. In 2001, she beat Chanda Rubin for her career best win. She played her last professional match in 2004—a first-round loss to Dally Randriantefy in an ITF event.

Bacheva won no WTA Tour singles titles, but did win two doubles titles in Casablanca and Budapest, respectively. She was a member of the Bulgarian Fed Cup team from 1993 to 1996 with a win–loss record of 1–6.

== Grand Slam performance timeline ==
Key
W	F	SF	QF	#R	RR	Q#	DNQ	A	NH

(W) winner; (F) finalist; (SF) semifinalist; (QF) quarterfinalist; (#R) rounds 4, 3, 2, 1; (RR) round-robin stage; (Q#) qualification round; (DNQ) did not qualify; (A) absent; (NH) not held; (SR) strike rate (events won / competed); (W–L) win–loss record.

=== Singles ===
Tournament	1993	1994–98	1999	2000	2001	2002	2003	2004	SR	W–L
Australian Open	A	A	A	1R	1R	Q1	A	Q1	0 / 2	0–2
French Open	Q2	A	2R	1R	1R	1R	Q2	1R	0 / 5	1–5
Wimbledon	A	A	1R	2R	1R	A	A	Q1	0 / 3	1–3
US Open	A	A	1R	2R	Q1	Q1	Q2	Q1	0 / 2	1–2
Win–loss	0–0	0–0	1–3	2–4	0–3	0–1	0–0	0–1	0 / 12	3–12

=== Doubles ===
Tournament	2000	2001	2002	2003	2004	SR	W–L
Australian Open	A	1R	1R	A	A	0 / 2	0–2
French Open	1R	1R	1R	1R	1R	0 / 5	0–5
Wimbledon	1R	1R	A	A	1R	0 / 3	0–3
US Open	2R	1R	1R	A	A	0 / 3	1–3
Win–loss	1–3	0–4	0–3	0–1	0–2	0 / 13	1–13

== WTA career finals ==
=== Doubles: 4 (2 titles, 2 runner–ups) ===
Legend Grand Slam tournaments (0–0) Tier III tournaments (0–1) Tier IV tournaments (1–0) Tier V tournaments (1–1)	Finals by surface Hard (0–0) Clay (2–1) Grass (0–0) Carpet (0–1)

Result	W–L	Date	Tournament	Tier	Surface	Partner	Opponents	Score
Win	1–0	Apr 2000	Hungarian Open	Tier IV	Clay	(Spain) Cristina Torrens Valero	(Croatia) Jelena Kostanić (Serbia and Montenegro) Sandra Načuk	6–0, 6–2
Loss	1–1	Oct 2000	Luxembourg Open	Tier III	Carpet (i)	(Spain) Cristina Torrens Valero	(France) Alexandra Fusai (France) Nathalie Tauziat	3–6, 6–7^{(0–7)}
Win	2–1	Jul 2001	Morocco Open	Tier V	Clay	(Sweden) Åsa Carlsson	(Spain) María José Martínez Sánchez (Argentina) María Emilia Salerni	6–3, 6–7^{(4–7)}, 6–1
Loss	2–2	Jul 2002	Palermo Open, Italy	Tier V	Clay	(Germany) Angelika Rösch	(Russia) Evgenia Kulikovskaya (Russia) Ekaterina Sysoeva	4–6, 3–6

== ITF Circuit finals ==
=== Singles: 25 (9 titles, 16 runner–ups) ===
Legend $100,000 tournaments $75,000 tournaments $50,000 tournaments $25,000 tournaments $10,000 tournaments	Finals by surface Hard (1–3) Clay (7–12) Grass (0–0) Carpet (1–1)

Result	W–L	Date	Tournament	Tier	Surface	Opponent	Score
Win	1–0	Apr 1991	ITF Sibenik, Yugoslavia	10,000	Clay	(Soviet Union) Irina Sukhova	6–1, 6–3
Loss	1–1	Jun 1991	ITF Dubrovnik, Bulgaria	10,000	Clay	(Czechoslovakia) Kateřina Šišková	2–6, 1–6
Win	2–1	Jul 1991	ITF Dubrovnik, Bulgaria	10,000	Clay	(Czechoslovakia) Kateřina Šišková	6–4, 1–6, 6–2
Loss	2–2	Sep 1991	ITF Haskovo, Bulgaria	10,000	Clay	(Soviet Union) Elena Makarova	4–6, 4–6
Loss	2–3	Jul 1992	ITF Vaihingen, Germany	25,000	Clay	(South Africa) Joannette Kruger	1–6, 0–6
Loss	2–4	Sep 1995	ITF Spoleto, Italy	25,000	Clay	(Italy) Cristina Salvi	6–7^{(3)}, 3–6
Win	3–4	Aug 1997	ITF Rebecq, Belgium	10,000	Clay	(France) Kildine Chevalier	6–3, 4–6, 6–3
Loss	3–5	Sep 1997	ITF Albena, Bulgaria	10,000	Clay	(Bulgaria) Desislava Topalova	6–2, 4–6, 0–6
Loss	3–6	Nov 1997	ITF Moulins, France	10,000	Hard (i)	(France) Edith Nunes-Bersot	2–6, 1–6
Loss	3–7	Nov 1997	ITF Deauville, France	10,000	Carpet (i)	(Germany) Gabriela Kučerová	3–6, 6–7^{(5)}
Win	4–7	Apr 1998	ITF Brest, France	10,000	Hard (i)	(France) Sophie Georges	7–5, 6–0
Loss	4–8	Jul 1998	ITF Puchheim, Germany	25,000	Clay	(Spain) Gisela Riera	4–6, 4–6
Loss	4–9	Jul 1998	ITF Darmstadt, Germany	25,000	Clay	(Hungary) Petra Mandula	6–3, 4–6, 5–7
Loss	4–10	Aug 1998	ITF Les Contamines, France	25,000	Hard	(Germany) Anca Barna	6–7^{(7)}, 1–6
Win	5–10	Nov 1998	ITF Deauville, France	10,000	Carpet (i)	(Slovakia) Silvia Sosnarová	6–3, 6–3
Loss	5–11	Mar 1999	ITF Biel, Switzerland	25,000	Hard (i)	(Australia) Evie Dominikovic	4–6, 7–6^{(2)}, 2–6
Win	6–11	Mar 1999	ITF Dinan, France	25,000	Clay (i)	(France) Stéphanie Foretz	6–2, 2–6, 6–1
Win	7–11	Sep 1999	ITF Denain, France	25,000	Clay	(France) Stéphanie Foretz	6–4, 6–1
Win	8–11	Sep 1999	ITF Bordeaux, France	50,000	Clay	(Italy) Gloria Pizzichini	3–6, 6–4, 6–3
Loss	8–12	Sep 1999	ITF Sofia, Bulgaria	25,000	Clay	(Spain) Marta Marrero	2–6, 3–6
Loss	8–13	Sep 2000	ITF Bordeaux, France	75,000	Clay	(France) Émilie Loit	5–7, 2–6
Loss	8–14	Sep 2001	ITF Denain, France	50,000	Clay	(France) Céline Beigbeder	4–6, 0–6
Win	9–14	Sep 2001	ITF Bordeaux, France	75,000	Clay	(Israel) Anna Smashnova	4–6, 6–1, 6–0
Loss	9–15	Aug 2003	ITF Cuneo, Italy	50,000	Clay	(Italy) Tathiana Garbin	3–6, 1–6
Loss	9–16	Jul 2004	ITF Vittel, France	50,000	Clay	(Spain) Nuria Llagostera Vives	2–6, 4–6

=== Doubles: 28 (11 titles, 17 runner–ups) ===
Legend $100,000 tournaments $75,000 tournaments $50,000 tournaments $25,000 tournaments $10,000 tournaments	Finals by surface Hard (2–2) Clay (7–11) Grass (0–0) Carpet (2–4)

Result	W–L	Date	Tournament	Tier	Surface	Partner	Opponents	Score
Win	1–0	Feb 1991	ITF Helsinki, Finland	10,000	Carpet (i)	(Soviet Union) Elena Pogorelova	(Germany) Nadja Beik (Germany) Meike Babel	6–2, 3–6, 6–3
Win	2–0	Jul 1991	ITF Dubrovnik, Yugoslavia	10,000	Clay	(Socialist Federal Republic of Yugoslavia) Ivona Horvat	(Soviet Union) Elena Pogorelova (Soviet Union) Irina Sukhova	5–7, 6–3, 6–3
Win	3–0	Sep 1991	ITF Haskovo, Bulgaria	10,000	Clay	(Bulgaria) Galia Angelova	(Soviet Union) Elena Pogorelova (Soviet Union) Irina Sukhova	7–6, 6–7, 6–1
Loss	3–1	Nov 1991	ITF Hull, Great Britain	25,000	Carpet (i)	(United Kingdom) Barbara Griffiths	(United Kingdom) Amanda Grunfeld (United Kingdom) Julie Salmon	6–7^{(2)}, 1–6
Loss	3–2	Apr 1992	ITF Limoges, France	25,000	Carpet (i)	(Czechoslovakia) Sylvia Štefková	(Belgium) Els Callens (Switzerland) Michèle Strebel	6–4, 1–6, 4–6
Loss	3–3	Sep 1992	ITF Sofia, Bulgaria	25,000	Clay	(Bulgaria) Galia Angelova	(Commonwealth of Independent States) Karina Kuregian (Australia) Kirrily Sharpe	6–7, 2–6
Win	4–3	Sep 1993	ITF Sofia, Bulgaria	25,000	Clay	(Bulgaria) Galia Angelova	(Slovakia) Patrícia Marková (Slovakia) Zuzana Nemšáková	6–0, 7–5
Loss	4–4	Apr 1994	ITF Marathon, Greece	10,000	Clay	(Netherlands) Sandra van der Aa	(Slovakia) Patrícia Marková (Slovakia) Simona Nedorostova	3–6, 0–6
Loss	4–5	Sep 1995	ITF Sofia, Bulgaria	25,000	Clay	(Hungary) Réka Vidáts	(Argentina) Geraldine Aizenberg (Argentina) Laura Montalvo	2–6, 2–6
Loss	4–6	Sep 1997	ITF Albena, Bulgaria	10,000	Clay	(Bulgaria) Antoaneta Pandjerova	(Bulgaria) Galina Dimitrova (Bulgaria) Desislava Topalova	5–7, 1–6
Win	5–6	Nov 1997	ITF Deauville, France	10,000	Carpet (i)	(Germany) Julia Abe	(Hungary) Katalin Marosi (Germany) Caroline Schneider	6–2, 6–4
Loss	5–7	Jul 1998	ITF Stuttgart, Germany	25,000	Clay	(Germany) Julia Abe	(Belgium) Laurence Courtois (Croatia) Maja Murić	1–6, 4–6
Win	6–7	Aug 1998	ITF Les Contamines, France	25,000	Hard	(Germany) Jasmin Wöhr	(France) Caroline Dhenin (France) Sophie Georges	2–6, 6–1, 6–3
Win	7–7	Aug 1998	ITF Sofia, Bulgaria	25,000	Clay	(Netherlands) Maaike Koutstaal	(Romania) Magda Mihalache (Slovakia) Zuzana Váleková	6–1, 7–5
Loss	7–8	Nov 1998	ITF Deauville, France	10,000	Carpet (i)	(Uzbekistan) Iroda Tulyaganova	(France) Emmanuelle Curutchet (France) Samantha Schoeffel	1–6, 6–2, 6–7^{(4)}
Loss	7–9	Sep 1999	ITF Bordeaux, France	50,000	Clay	(Spain) Cristina Torrens Valero	(Sweden) Åsa Carlsson (France) Émilie Loit	2–6, 6–7^{(1)}
Loss	7–10	Jul 2001	ITF Orbetello, Italy	25,000	Clay	(Belgium) Laurence Courtois	(Argentina) María Emilia Salerni (Argentina) Patricia Tarabini	6–7^{(5)}, 6–3, 1–6
Loss	7–11	Oct 2001	ITF Poitiers, France	75,000	Hard (i)	(Netherlands) Amanda Hopmans	(Netherlands) Kristie Boogert (Belgium) Laurence Courtois	1–6, 5–7
Loss	7–12	Oct 2001	ITF Southampton, Great Britain	50,000	Hard (i)	(Ukraine) Elena Tatarkova	(South Africa) Nannie de Villiers (Kazakhstan) Irina Selyutina	6–7^{(5)}, 6–2, 2–6
Win	8–12	Sep 2002	ITF Biella, Italy	50,000	Clay	(Spain) Eva Bes	(Spain) María José Martínez Sánchez (Spain) Anabel Medina Garrigues	7–5, 2–6, 7–6^{(5)}
Win	9–12	Oct 2002	ITF Girona, Spain	50,000	Clay	(Spain) Gala León García	(Italy) Flavia Pennetta (Romania) Andreea Ehritt-Vanc	6–4, 6–3
Win	10–12	Nov 2002	ITF Poitiers, France	50,000	Hard (i)	(Russia) Evgenia Kulikovskaya	(France) Caroline Dhenin (France) Émilie Loit	w/o
Loss	10–13	Aug 2003	ITF Cuneo, Italy	50,000	Clay	(Austria) Stefanie Haidner	(Bosnia and Herzegovina) Mervana Jugić-Salkić (Croatia) Darija Jurak	1–6, 2–6
Loss	10–14	Oct 2003	ITF Girona, Spain	50,000	Clay	(Italy) Roberta Vinci	(Spain) Conchita Martínez Granados (Spain) María José Martínez Sánchez	5–7, 3–6
Loss	10–15	Feb 2004	ITF Ortisei, Italy	75,000	Carpet (i)	(Germany) Angelika Rösch	(Czech Republic) Olga Vymetálková (Czech Republic) Gabriela Chmelinová	1–6, 3–6
Win	11–15	May 2004	Open de Cagnes-sur-Mer, France	75,000	Clay	(Czech Republic) Eva Birnerová	(Romania) Ruxandra Dragomir (Germany) Antonia Matic	4–6, 7–6^{(4)}, 6–3
Loss	11–16	Aug 2004	ITF Modena, Italy	75,000	Clay	(Czech Republic) Eva Birnerová	(Czech Republic) Gabriela Chmelinová (Czech Republic) Michaela Paštiková	2–6, 3–6
Loss	11–17	Sep 2004	ITF Denain, France	75,000	Clay	(Czech Republic) Michaela Paštiková	(Ukraine) Yuliana Fedak (Germany) Anna-Lena Grönefeld	6–1, 1–6, 2–6

- w/o = walkover

== Fed Cup ==
Lubomira Bacheva debuted for the Bulgaria Fed Cup team in 1993. She has a 0–4 singles and a 1–2 doubles record (1–6 overall).

=== Singles (0–4) ===
Edition	Round	Date	Against	Surface	Opponent	W/L	Result
1995 World Group I	RPO	22 July 1995	South Africa	Hard	(South Africa) Joannette Kruger	L	0–6, 3–6
1995 World Group I	RPO	23 July 1995	South Africa	Hard	(South Africa) Amanda Coetzer	L	2–6, 4–6
1996 World Group II	QF	27 April 1996	Slovakia	Clay	(Slovakia) Karina Habšudová	L	0–6, 1–6
1996 World Group II	QF	28 April 1996	Slovakia	Clay	(Slovakia) Katarína Studeníková	L	3–6, 4–6

=== Doubles (1–2) ===
Edition	Round	Date	Partner	Against	Surface	Opponents	W/L	Result
1993 World Group I	R1	19 July 1993	(Bulgaria) Katerina Maleeva	South Korea	Clay	(South Korea) Kim Il-soon (South Korea) Park Sung-hee	L	6–3, 6–7^{(2)}, 1–4 ret.
1994 World Group I	R2	21 July 1994	(Bulgaria) Svetlana Krivencheva	Indonesia	Clay	(Indonesia) Natalia Soetrisno (Indonesia) Romana Tedjakusuma	W	6–1, 6–3
1995 World Group I	RPO	23 July 1995	(Bulgaria) Dora Djilianova	South Africa	Hard	(South Africa) Amanda Coetzer (South Africa) Elna Reinach	L	1–6, 4–6

- RPO = Relegation Play–off
