= Evgenia Kulikovskaya =

Russian tennis player

Evgenia Kulikovskaya Евгения Куликовская
- Country (sports): Russia
- Residence: Moscow
- Born: 21 December 1978 (age 47) Moscow, RSFSR
- Height: 1.63 m (5 ft 4 in)
- Turned pro: 1994
- Retired: 2004
- Plays: Ambidextrous (no backhand)
- Prize money: $427,770

Singles
- Career record: 221–175
- Career titles: 8 ITF
- Highest ranking: No. 91 (9 June 2003)

Grand Slam singles results
- Australian Open: 1R (2003)
- French Open: 2R (2003)
- Wimbledon: 1R (1999, 2003)
- US Open: 2R (1998, 2001)

Doubles
- Career record: 197–148
- Career titles: 4 WTA, 12 ITF
- Highest ranking: No. 46 (3 March 2003)

Evgenia Borisovna Kulikovskaya (Russian: Евгения Борисовна Куликовская; born 21 December 1978) is a former professional tennis player from Russia.

She reached her highest singles ranking of No. 91 in June 2003. She had more success in doubles, winning four doubles titles on the WTA Tour and reaching the top 50.

A rarity among tennis players, Kulikovskaya is ambidextrous; she played with two forehands and no backhand, switching her racket hand depending on where the ball was coming from.

== WTA career finals ==
=== Doubles: 10 (4 titles, 6 runner-ups) ===
Legend
Grand Slam tournaments (0–0)
Tier I (0–0)
Tier II (0–0)
Tier III, IV, V (4–6)

Result	No.	Date	Tournament	Surface	Partner	Opponents	Score
Loss	1.	Apr 1998	Makarska Championships, Croatia	Clay	(Austria) Karin Kschwendt	(Slovenia) Tina Križan (Slovenia) Katarina Srebotnik	6–7^{(3)}, 1–6
Win	1.	Apr 1999	Budapest Grand Prix, Hungary	Clay	(Serbia and Montenegro) Sandra Načuk	(Argentina) Laura Montalvo (Spain) Virginia Ruano Pascual	6–3, 6–4
Win	2.	Jun 1999	Tashkent Open, Uzbekistan	Clay	(Austria) Patricia Wartusch	(Spain) Eva Bes (Spain) Gisela Riera	7–6^{(3)}, 6–0
Loss	2.	Aug 1999	Knokke-Heist, Belgium	Clay	(Serbia and Montenegro) Sandra Naćuk	(Czech Republic) Eva Martincová (Germany) Elena Wagner	6–3, 3–6, 3–6
Loss	3.	Nov 1999	Pattaya Open, Thailand	Hard	(Austria) Patricia Wartusch	(France) Émilie Loit (Sweden) Åsa Carlsson	1–6, 4–6
Loss	4.	May 2002	J&S Cup, Poland	Clay	(Croatia) Silvija Talaja	(Slovakia) Henrieta Nagyová (Croatia) Jelena Kostanić Tošić	1–6, 1–6
Win	3.	Jul 2002	Internazionali di Palermo, Italy	Clay	(Russia) Ekaterina Sysoeva	(Bulgaria) Lubomira Bacheva (Germany) Angelika Rösch	6–4, 6–3
Loss	5.	Jul 2002	Warsaw Open, Poland	Clay	(Russia) Ekaterina Sysoeva	(Russia) Svetlana Kuznetsova (Spain) Arantxa Sánchez Vicario	2–6, 2–6
Loss	6.	Feb 2003	Bangalore Open, India	Hard	(Belarus) Tatiana Poutchek	(Russia) Elena Likhovtseva (Uzbekistan) Iroda Tulyaganova	4–6, 4–6
Win	4.	Aug 2003	Nordic Light Open, Finland	Clay	(Ukraine) Elena Tatarkova	(Ukraine) Tatiana Perebiynis (Croatia) Silvija Talaja	6–2, 6–4

== ITF Circuit finals ==
$100,000 tournaments
$75,000 tournaments
$50,000 tournaments
$25,000 tournaments
$10,000 tournaments

=== Singles: 14 (8–6) ===
Result	No.	Date	Tournament	Surface	Opponent	Score
Loss	1.	31 October 1994	ITF Jūrmala, Latvia	Hard (i)	(Belarus) Vera Zhukovets	2–6, 6–7^{(4)}
Win	2.	5 June 1995	ITF Łódź, Poland	Clay	(Ukraine) Talina Beiko	6–1, 2–6, 6–3
Win	3.	12 June 1995	ITF Bytom, Poland	Clay	(Czech Republic) Monika Maštalířová	6–4, 6–2
Win	4.	18 February 1996	ITF Sheffield, England	Hard (i)	(Czech Republic) Jana Macurová	6–2, 6–3
Win	5.	26 August 1996	ITF Kyiv, Ukraine	Clay	(Belarus) Tatiana Ignatieva	6–1, 7–5
Win	6.	1 September 1996	ITF Sochi, Russia	Clay	(Russia) Maria Goloviznina	6–1, 6–0
Loss	7.	31 August 1997	ITF Athens, Greece	Clay	(Romania) Alice Pirsu	6–4, 5–7, 3–6
Win	8.	19 October 1997	ITF Southampton, England	Carpet (i)	(Ukraine) Elena Tatarkova	6–0, 4–6, 7–6^{(5)}
Win	9.	4 October 1998	ITF Tbilisi, Georgia	Clay	(Russia) Elena Makarova	2–6, 6–2, 7–5
Loss	10.	22 April 2001	ITF Allentown, United States	Hard (i)	(Kazakhstan) Irina Selyutina	4–6, 1–6
Win	11.	7 July 2002	ITF Orbetello, Italy	Clay	(Spain) María Sánchez Lorenzo	6–1, 7–5
Loss	12.	21 July 2002	ITF Modena, Italy	Clay	(Czech Republic) Denisa Chládková	2–6, 3–6
Loss	13.	15 September 2002	ITF Bordeaux, France	Clay	(Madagascar) Dally Randriantefy	5–7, 2–6
Loss	14.	17 November 2002	ITF Eugene, United States	Hard (i)	(United States) Marissa Irvin	5–7, 0–6

=== Doubles: 24 (12–12) ===
Result	No.	Date	Tournament	Surface	Partner	Opponents	Score
Loss	1.	23 May 1994	ITF Łódź, Poland	Clay	(Ukraine) Natalia Nemchinova	(Argentina) Valeria Strappa (Argentina) Valentina Solari	6–3, 5–7, 4–6
Win	2.	30 May 1994	ITF Bytom, Poland	Clay	(Ukraine) Natalia Nemchinova	(Ukraine) Talina Beiko (Ukraine) Tanja Tsiganii	6–2, 3–6, 6–2
Win	3.	22 August 1994	ITF Horb, Germany	Clay	(Ukraine) Natalia Nemchinova	(Czech Republic) Martina Hautová (Slovakia) Simona Nedorostová	6–2, 6–2
Loss	4.	29 August 1994	ITF Bad Nauheim, Germany	Clay	(Ukraine) Natalia Nemchinova	(Germany) Renata Kochta (Czech Republic) Alena Vašková	3–6, 6–1, 4–6
Win	5.	5 June 1995	ITF Łódź, Poland	Clay	(Ukraine) Natalia Nemchinova	(Bulgaria) Teodora Nedeva (Greece) Christina Zachariadou	6–7^{(2)}, 6–3, 6–3
Loss	6.	12 June 1995	ITF Bytom, Poland	Clay	(Ukraine) Natalia Nemchinova	(Bulgaria) Teodora Nedeva (Poland) Katharzyna Teodorowicz	2–6, 2–6
Win	7.	31 March 1997	ITF Makarska, Croatia	Clay	(Germany) Caroline Schneider	(Hungary) Nóra Köves (Czech Republic) Helena Vildová	6–1, 4–6, 6–4
Win	8.	19 May 1997	ITF Sochi, Russia	Hard	(Russia) Ekaterina Sysoeva	(Georgia (country)) Nino Louarsabishvili (Japan) Kaoru Shibata	3–6, 6–3, 6–0
Loss	9.	28 July 1997	ITF Makarska, Croatia	Clay	(Russia) Maria Goloviznina	(Ukraine) Olga Lugina (Germany) Elena Pampoulova	7–5, 5–7, 5–7
Win	10.	25 August 1997	ITF Athens, Greece	Clay	(Serbia and Montenegro) Sandra Načuk	(Spain) Rosa María Andrés Rodríguez (Spain) Marina Martinez Escobar	6–4, 6–3
Loss	11.	22 September 1997	ITF Thessaloniki, Greece	Clay	(Russia) Maria Goloviznina	(Czech Republic) Radka Bobková (Czech Republic) Jana Pospíšilová	2–6, 3–6
Win	12.	5 October 1998	ITF Batumi, Georgia	Hard	(Russia) Ekaterina Sysoeva	(Netherlands) Amanda Hopmans (Austria) Melanie Schnell	6–4, 3–6, 6–0
Loss	13.	3 July 2000	ITF Civitanova, Italy	Clay	(Belarus) Tatiana Poutchek	(Spain) Rosa María Andrés Rodríguez (Spain) Conchita Martínez Granados	2–6, 3–6
Loss	14.	14 August 2000	ITF İstanbul, Turkey	Hard	(Russia) Maria Goloviznina	(Romania) Magda Mihalache (Hong Kong) Tong Ka-po	1–6, 2–6
Loss	15.	11 September 2000	ITF Hopewell, United States	Hard	(United States) Jolene Watanabe	(United States) Jennifer Hopkins (Slovenia) Petra Rampre	3–6, 1–6
Win	16.	15 January 2001	ITF Boca Raton, United States	Hard	(United States) Jolene Watanabe	(United States) Melissa Middleton (United States) Jacqueline Trail	6–1, 6–0
Win	17.	22 January 2001	ITF Miami, United States	Hard	(United States) Jolene Watanabe	(United States) Jane Chi (Russia) Lioudmila Skavronskaia	6–2, 6–4
Loss	18.	29 January 2001	ITF Clearwater, United States	Hard	(United States) Jolene Watanabe	(Brazil) Joana Cortez (Argentina) Clarisa Fernández	1–6, 5–7
Loss	19.	18 February 2002	ITF Columbus, United States	Hard (i)	(Russia) Maria Goloviznina	(United States) Teryn Ashley (United States) Kristen Schlukebir	6–4, 4–6, 2–6
Loss	20.	1 July 2002	ITF Orbetello, Italy	Clay	(Russia) Ekaterina Sysoeva	(Estonia) Maret Ani (Romania) Andreea Ehritt-Vanc	3–6, 6–1, 1–6
Win	21.	3 November 2002	ITF Poitiers, France	Hard (i)	(Bulgaria) Lubomira Bacheva	(France) Caroline Dhenin (France) Émilie Loit	w/o
Loss	22.	12 November 2002	ITF Eugene, United States	Hard (i)	(Ukraine) Elena Tatarkova	(Japan) Nana Smith (Venezuela) Milagros Sequera	6–3, 2–6, 4–6
Win	23.	2 May 2003	Open Saint-Gaudens, France	Clay	(Ukraine) Tatiana Perebiynis	(Belarus) Tatiana Poutchek (Australia) Anastasia Rodionova	7–6^{(8)}, 6–3
Win	24.	28 March 2004	ITF St. Petersburg, Russia	Hard (i)	(Russia) Maria Goloviznina	(Belarus) Darya Kustova (Ukraine) Elena Tatarkova	7–5, 6–1
