= 1999 Kremlin Cup – Women's doubles qualifying =

Women's doubles qualifying
- 1999 Kremlin Cup

Events
Singles	men	women
Doubles	men	women
← 1998 ·	Kremlin Cup	· 2000 →

The 1999 Kremlin Cup was a WTA tennis tournament, played on indoor carpet courts.

== Players ==
=== Seeds ===
1. (France) Sarah Pitkowski / (Russia) Ekaterina Sysoeva (Qualifiers)
2. (Austria) Sylvia Plischke / (Croatia) Silvija Talaja (qualifying competition)

=== Qualifiers ===
1. (France) Sarah Pitkowski / (Russia) Ekaterina Sysoeva

== Qualifying draw ==
=== Key ===
- Q = Qualifier
- WC = Wild card
- LL = Lucky loser
- Alt = Alternate
- SE = Special exempt
- PR = Protected ranking
- ITF = ITF entry
- JE = Junior exempt
- w/o = Walkover
- r = Retired
- d = Defaulted
- SR = Special ranking

First round
4	(Ukraine) Tatiana Perebiynis (Ukraine) Anna Zaporozhanova	8
(Russia) Irina Kornienko (Russia) Ekaterina Paniouchkina	5
(Russia) Maria Goloviznina (Russia) Anastasia Myskina	8
(Germany) Vanessa Henke (Germany) Marketa Kochta	9
(Russia) Goulnara Fattakhetdinova (Armenia) Liudmila Nikoyan	3
2	(Austria) Sylvia Plischke (Croatia) Silvija Talaja	8

Second round
1	(France) Sarah Pitkowski (Russia) Ekaterina Sysoeva	8
(Ukraine) Tatiana Perebiynis (Ukraine) Anna Zaporozhanova	5
(Germany) Vanessa Henke (Germany) Marketa Kochta
2	(Austria) Sylvia Plischke (Croatia) Silvija Talaja	w/o

Qualifying competition
1	(France) Sarah Pitkowski (Russia) Ekaterina Sysoeva	9
2	(Austria) Sylvia Plischke (Croatia) Silvija Talaja	8
