= 2000 Kremlin Cup – Women's singles =

Women's singles
- 2000 Kremlin Cup

Final
- Champion: (Switzerland) Martina Hingis
- Runner-up: (Russia) Anna Kournikova
- Score: 6–3, 6–1

Details
- Draw: 28 (2WC/4Q)
- Seeds: 8

Events
Singles	men	women
Doubles	men	women
← 1999 ·	Kremlin Cup	· 2001 →

Martina Hingis defeated Anna Kournikova in the final, 6–3, 6–1 to win the women's singles tennis title at the 2000 Kremlin Cup.

Nathalie Tauziat was the defending champion, but lost to Kournikova in the semifinals.

== Seeds ==
The top four seeds received a bye to the second round.

1. (Switzerland) Martina Hingis (champion)
2. (France) Nathalie Tauziat (semifinals)
3. (Spain) Arantxa Sánchez Vicario (second round)
4. (Russia) Anna Kournikova (final)
5. (France) Amélie Mauresmo (semifinals)
6. (France) Julie Halard-Decugis (first round)
7. (Russia) Elena Dementieva (quarterfinals)
8. (Austria) Barbara Schett (quarterfinals)

== Draw ==
=== Finals ===
Semifinals
1	(Switzerland) Martina Hingis	7	6
5	(France) Amélie Mauresmo	5	3
4	(Russia) Anna Kournikova	6	6
2	(France) Nathalie Tauziat	2	1

Final
1	(Switzerland) Martina Hingis	6	6
4	(Russia) Anna Kournikova	3	1

=== Top half ===
First round
(Czech Republic) K Hrdličková	4	6	6
Q	(Slovakia) J Husárová	6	2	3
(Croatia) S Talaja	1	2
(Italy) S Farina Elia	6	6
(Romania) R Dragomir	7	5	1
7	(Russia) E Dementieva	6^{6}	7	6
WC	(Russia) L Krasnoroutskaya	6	1	3
(Bulgaria) M Maleeva	4	6	6
Q	(Belarus) T Poutchek	6^{5}	3
(United States) L Raymond	7^{7}	6
(Australia) J Dokić	1	4
5	(France) A Mauresmo	6	6

Second round
1	(Switzerland) M Hingis	6	6
(Czech Republic) K Hrdličková	0	1
(Italy) S Farina Elia	6	4	4
7	(Russia) E Dementieva	2	6	6
3	(Spain) A Sánchez Vicario	3	2
(Bulgaria) M Maleeva	6	6
(United States) L Raymond	2	4
5	(France) A Mauresmo	6	6

Quarterfinals
1	(Switzerland) M Hingis	6	6^{5}	7
7	(Russia) E Dementieva	0	7^{7}	5
(Bulgaria) M Maleeva	6	6^{3}	3
5	(France) A Mauresmo	4	7^{7}	6

Semifinals
1	(Switzerland) M Hingis	7	6
5	(France) A Mauresmo	5	3

=== Bottom half ===
First round
6	(France) J Halard-Decugis	4	6^{5}
(Russia) T Panova	6	7^{7}
Q	(Russia) G Fokina	5	6	2
(Argentina) P Suárez	7	2	6
Q	(Russia) E Bovina	7^{7}	5	1
WC	(Russia) V Zvonareva	6^{5}	7	6
8	(Austria) B Schett	6	6
(Russia) E Likhovtseva	4	1
(Spain) M Serna	6^{3}	6	3
(Switzerland) P Schnyder	7^{7}	1	6
(Belgium) S Appelmans	3	6^{5}
(Japan) A Sugiyama	6	7^{7}

Second round
(Russia) T Panova	6	4	6
(Argentina) P Suárez	2	6	1
WC	(Russia) V Zvonareva	6^{4}	4
4	(Russia) A Kournikova	7^{7}	6
8	(Austria) B Schett	6	6
(Switzerland) P Schnyder	4	3
(Japan) A Sugiyama	3	5
2	(France) N Tauziat	6	7

Quarterfinals
(Russia) T Panova	4	1
4	(Russia) A Kournikova	6	6
8	(Austria) B Schett	6^{7}	2
2	(France) N Tauziat	7^{9}	6

Semifinals
4	(Russia) A Kournikova	6	6
2	(France) N Tauziat	2	1

== Qualifying ==
=== Qualifying seeds ===
1. (Canada) Sonya Jeyaseelan (second round)
2. (Italy) ~~Silvia Farina Elia~~ (moved to Main Draw)
3. (Italy) Francesca Schiavone (first round)
4. (Russia) Alina Jidkova (second round)
5. (Belarus) Tatiana Poutchek (qualified)
6. (Belarus) Nadejda Ostrovskaya (qualifying competition)
7. (Hungary) Katalin Marosi-Aracama (second round)
8. (Germany) Bianka Lamade (second round)
9. (Germany) Andrea Glass (qualifying competition)

=== Qualifiers ===
1. (Slovakia) Janette Husárová
2. (Russia) Galina Fokina
3. (Russia) Elena Bovina
4. (Belarus) Tatiana Poutchek

=== Qualifying draw ===
==== First qualifier ====
First round
1	(Canada) Sonya Jeyaseelan	7	6
(Russia) Maria Goloviznina	5	4
(Bulgaria) Svetlana Krivencheva	3	1
(Slovakia) Janette Husárová	6	6
(Russia) Anastasia Rodionova	7^{9}	2	2
(Germany) Vanessa Henke	6^{7}	6	6
WC	(Russia) Elena Voropaeva	2	1
6	(Belarus) Nadejda Ostrovskaya	6	6

Second round
1	(Canada) Sonya Jeyaseelan	6	1	0
(Slovakia) Janette Husárová	3	6	6
(Germany) Vanessa Henke	6	3	3
6	(Belarus) Nadejda Ostrovskaya	4	6	6

Qualifying competition
(Slovakia) Janette Husárová	3	6	6
6	(Belarus) Nadejda Ostrovskaya	6	3	3

==== Second qualifier ====
First round
4	(Russia) Alina Jidkova	6	6
(Switzerland) Marie-Gaïané Mikaelian	1	2
WC	(Russia) Galina Fokina	6	6
(Ukraine) Tatiana Kovalchuk	1	0
WC	(Russia) Anna Bastrikova	6	1	6
(Czech Republic) Lenka Cenková	2	6	1
(Italy) Germana Di Natale	2	3
8	(Germany) Bianka Lamade	6	6

Second round
4	(Russia) Alina Jidkova	2	6	2
WC	(Russia) Galina Fokina	6	4	6
WC	(Russia) Anna Bastrikova	6	6
8	(Germany) Bianka Lamade	4	3

Qualifying competition
WC	(Russia) Galina Fokina	6	6
WC	(Russia) Anna Bastrikova	2	4

==== Third qualifier ====
First round
7	(Hungary) Katalin Marosi-Aracama	7^{7}	7
(Czech Republic) Hana Šromová	6^{2}	5
(Russia) Natalia Egorova	3	4
(Russia) Elena Bovina	6	6
(Russia) Evgenia Kulikovskaya	7^{7}	2	6^{3}
(Slovenia) Tina Križan	6^{4}	6	7^{7}
(Slovenia) Petra Rampre	7	6
3	(Italy) Francesca Schiavone	5	1

Second round
7	(Hungary) Katalin Marosi-Aracama	3	5
(Russia) Elena Bovina	6	7
(Slovenia) Tina Križan
(Slovenia) Petra Rampre	w/o

Qualifying competition
(Russia) Elena Bovina	6	6
(Slovenia) Petra Rampre	3	1

==== Fourth qualifier ====
First round
5	(Belarus) Tatiana Poutchek	6	6^{4}	6
(Ukraine) Anna Zaporozhanova	4	7^{7}	2
(Ukraine) Julia Vakulenko	6	6
(Ukraine) Tatiana Perebiynis	3	4
(Germany) Adriana Barna	7^{7}	3	7^{7}
(France) Alexandra Fusai	6^{3}	6	6^{2}
WC	(Russia) Gulnara Fattakhetdinova	1	5
9	(Germany) Andrea Glass	6	7

Second round
5	(Belarus) Tatiana Poutchek	6	6
(Ukraine) Julia Vakulenko	4	2
(Germany) Adriana Barna	2	1
9	(Germany) Andrea Glass	6	6

Qualifying competition
5	(Belarus) Tatiana Poutchek	7	6
9	(Germany) Andrea Glass	5	1
