= 1999 Kremlin Cup – Women's doubles =

Women's doubles
- 1999 Kremlin Cup

Final
- Champions: (United States) Lisa Raymond (Australia) Rennae Stubbs
- Runners-up: (France) Julie Halard-Decugis (Germany) Anke Huber
- Score: 6–1, 6–0

Details
- Seeds: 4

Events
| Singles | men | women |
| Doubles | men | women |
| ← 1998 · | Kremlin Cup | · 2000 → |

The 1999 Kremlin Cup women's doubles was the women's doubles event of the fourth WTA edition of the Kremlin Cup; a WTA Tier I tournament and the most prestigious tournament held in Russia. Mary Pierce and Natasha Zvereva were the defending champions, but Pierce competed this year with Barbara Schett, whereas Zvereva competed with Elena Tatarkova.

Pierce and Schett withdrew after their first round victory, whereas Zvereva and Tatarkova were defeated in the semifinals by eventual champions Lisa Raymond and Rennae Stubbs.

== Seeds ==
1. (Ukraine) Elena Tatarkova / (Belarus) Natasha Zvereva (semifinals)
2. (Russia) Elena Likhovtseva / (Japan) Ai Sugiyama (semifinals)
3. (United States) Lisa Raymond / (Australia) Rennae Stubbs (champions)
4. (Spain) Conchita Martínez / (Argentina) Patricia Tarabini (first round)

== Draw ==
=== Key ===
- Q = Qualifier
- WC = Wild card
- LL = Lucky loser
- Alt = Alternate
- SE = Special exempt
- PR = Protected ranking
- ITF = ITF entry
- JE = Junior exempt
- w/o = Walkover
- r = Retired
- d = Defaulted
- SR = Special ranking

=== Draw ===
First round
1 | (Ukraine) E Tatarkova (Belarus) N Zvereva | 6 | 6
(United States) K Po (France) A-G Sidot | 4 | 2
Q | (France) S Pitkowski (Russia) E Sysoeva | 1 | 6^{6}
(France) M Pierce (Austria) B Schett | 6 | 7^{8}
3 | (United States) L Raymond (Australia) R Stubbs | 6 | 6
(Canada) M Drake (Germany) C Schneider | 4 | 3
(Romania) C Cristea (Romania) R Dragomir | 3 | 7^{9} | 6
(Russia) N Petrova (Switzerland) P Schnyder | 6 | 6^{7} | 0
(France) J Halard-Decugis (Germany) A Huber | 6 | 6
(Bulgaria) S Krivencheva (Belarus) N Ostrovskaya | 2 | 0
WC | (Russia) L Krasnoroutskaya (Russia) E Makarova | 7 | 6
4 | (Spain) C Martínez (Argentina) P Tarabini | 5 | 4
(Italy) S Farina (United States) C Rubin | 3 | 4
(Latvia) L Neiland (Belgium) D Van Roost | 6 | 6
(Czech Republic) M Paštiková (Belarus) T Poutchek | 6^{1} | 2
2 | (Russia) E Likhovtseva (Japan) A Sugiyama | 7^{7} | 6

Quarterfinals
1 | (Ukraine) E Tatarkova (Belarus) N Zvereva | w/o
(France) M Pierce (Austria) B Schett
3 | (United States) L Raymond (Australia) R Stubbs | 6 | 7
(Romania) C Cristea (Romania) R Dragomir | 0 | 6^{5}
(France) J Halard-Decugis (Germany) A Huber | 6 | 6
WC | (Russia) L Krasnoroutskaya (Russia) E Makarova | 1 | 1
(Latvia) L Neiland (Belgium) D Van Roost | 4 | 1
2 | (Russia) E Likhovtseva (Japan) A Sugiyama | 6 | 6

Semifinals
1 | (Ukraine) E Tatarkova (Belarus) N Zvereva | 6^{7} | 4
3 | (United States) L Raymond (Australia) R Stubbs | 7^{9} | 6
(France) J Halard-Decugis (Germany) A Huber | 6 | 5 | 6
2 | (Russia) E Likhovtseva (Japan) A Sugiyama | 3 | 7 | 0

Final
3 | (United States) L Raymond (Australia) R Stubbs | 6 | 6
(France) J Halard-Decugis (Germany) A Huber | 1 | 0

== Qualifying ==
=== Seeds ===
1. (France) Sarah Pitkowski / (Russia) Ekaterina Sysoeva (Qualifiers)
2. (Austria) Sylvia Plischke / (Croatia) Silvija Talaja (qualifying competition)

=== Qualifiers ===
1. (France) Sarah Pitkowski / (Russia) Ekaterina Sysoeva

== Qualifying draw ==
=== Key ===
- Q = Qualifier
- WC = Wild card
- LL = Lucky loser
- Alt = Alternate
- SE = Special exempt
- PR = Protected ranking
- ITF = ITF entry
- JE = Junior exempt
- w/o = Walkover
- r = Retired
- d = Defaulted
- SR = Special ranking

First round
1 | (France) Sarah Pitkowski (Russia) Ekaterina Sysoeva
Bye
(Ukraine) Tatiana Perebiynis (Ukraine) Anna Zaporozhanova | 8
(Russia) Irina Kornienko (Russia) Ekaterina Paniouchkina | 5
(Russia) Maria Goloviznina (Russia) Anastasia Myskina | 8
(Germany) Vanessa Henke (Germany) Marketa Kochta | 9
(Russia) Gulnara Fattakhetdinova (Armenia) Liudmila Nikoyan | 3
2 | (Austria) Sylvia Plischke (Croatia) Silvija Talaja | 8

Second round
1 | (France) Sarah Pitkowski (Russia) Ekaterina Sysoeva | 8
(Ukraine) Tatiana Perebiynis (Ukraine) Anna Zaporozhanova | 5
(Germany) Vanessa Henke (Germany) Marketa Kochta
2 | (Austria) Sylvia Plischke (Croatia) Silvija Talaja | w/o

Qualifying competition
1 | (France) Sarah Pitkowski (Russia) Ekaterina Sysoeva | 9
2 | (Austria) Sylvia Plischke (Croatia) Silvija Talaja | 8
