= 1999 Kremlin Cup – Women's singles =

Women's singles
- 1999 Kremlin Cup

Final
- Champion: (France) Nathalie Tauziat
- Runner-up: (Austria) Barbara Schett
- Score: 2–6, 6–4, 6–1

Details
- Draw: 28
- Seeds: 8

Events
Singles	men	women
Doubles	men	women
← 1998 ·	Kremlin Cup	· 2000 →

Nathalie Tauziat defeated Barbara Schett in the final, 2–6, 6–4, 6–1 to win the women's singles tennis title at the 1999 Kremlin Cup.

Mary Pierce was the defending champion, but lost to Ai Sugiyama in the second round.

== Seeds ==
The top four seeds received a bye to the second round.

1. (France) Mary Pierce (second round)
2. (Austria) Barbara Schett (final)
3. (France) Julie Halard-Decugis (quarterfinals)
4. (France) Nathalie Tauziat (champion)
5. (Belgium) Dominique Van Roost (semifinals)
6. (Spain) Conchita Martínez (first round)
7. (France) Sandrine Testud (first round)
8. (Russia) Elena Likhovtseva (first round)

== Draw ==
=== Key ===
- Q = Qualifier
- WC = Wild card
- LL = Lucky loser
- Alt = Alternate
- SE = Special exempt
- PR = Protected ranking
- ITF = ITF entry
- JE = Junior exempt
- w/o = Walkover
- r = Retired
- d = Defaulted
- SR = Special ranking

=== Finals ===
Semifinals
(United States) Lisa Raymond	4	2
4	(France) Nathalie Tauziat	6	6
5	(Belgium) Dominique Van Roost	5	6^{6}
2	(Austria) Barbara Schett	7	7^{8}

Final
4	(France) Nathalie Tauziat	2	6	6
2	(Austria) Barbara Schett	6	4	1

=== Top half ===
First round
(Japan) A Sugiyama	6	3	6
(Luxembourg) A Kremer	1	6	2
Q	(Ukraine) E Tatarkova	3	6^{0}
(United States) L Raymond	6	7^{7}
Q	(Russia) N Petrova	6	6
6	(Spain) C Martínez	1	4
WC	(Russia) T Panova	7^{9}	1	7
Q	(Russia) E Dementieva	6^{7}	6	5
LL	(United States) K Po	6	6^{4}	4
(Germany) A Huber	4	7^{7}	6
(Romania) R Dragomir	6	7
8	(Russia) E Likhovtseva	3	5

Second round
1	(France) M Pierce	4	6	3
(Japan) A Sugiyama	6	3	6
(United States) L Raymond	6	6
Q	(Russia) N Petrova	2	2
4	(France) N Tauziat	6	3	6
WC	(Russia) T Panova	3	6	3
(Germany) A Huber	6	4	6
(Romania) R Dragomir	3	6	3

Quarterfinals
(Japan) A Sugiyama	3	5
(United States) L Raymond	6	7
4	(France) N Tauziat	6	6
(Germany) A Huber	4	3

Semifinals
(United States) L Raymond	4	2
4	(France) N Tauziat	6	6

=== Bottom half ===
First round
5	(Belgium) D Van Roost	7	6
(Switzerland) P Schnyder	5	2
WC	(Russia) L Krasnoroutskaya	6	3	6
(Croatia) S Talaja	1	6	3
(Austria) S Plischke	3	4
(France) A-G Sidot	6	6
7	(France) S Testud	3	4
(Italy) S Farina	6	6
(Belarus) N Zvereva	4	3
(France) S Pitkowski	6	6
(United States) C Rubin	4	3
Q	(Russia) A Myskina	6	6

Second round
5	(Belgium) D Van Roost	6	2	7
WC	(Russia) L Krasnoroutskaya	2	6	5
(France) A-G Sidot	2	5
3	(France) J Halard-Decugis	6	7
(Italy) S Farina	6	6
(France) S Pitkowski	3	1
Q	(Russia) A Myskina	6	4	2
2	(Austria) B Schett	3	6	6

Quarterfinals
5	(Belgium) D Van Roost	6	4	6
3	(France) J Halard-Decugis	1	6	1
(Italy) S Farina	6	4	3
2	(Austria) B Schett	1	6	6

Semifinals
5	(Belgium) D Van Roost	5	6^{6}
2	(Austria) B Schett	7	7^{8}

== Qualifying ==
=== Seeds ===
1. (Canada) Maureen Drake (first round)
2. (Russia) Elena Dementieva (qualifier)
3. (Russia) Anastasia Myskina (qualifier)
4. (Switzerland) Miroslava Vavrinec (first round)
5. replaced by (Belarus) Tatiana Poutchek (first round)
6. (Ukraine) Elena Tatarkova (qualifier)
7. (Romania) Cătălina Cristea (second round)
8. (United States) Kimberly Po (qualifying competition, lucky loser)

=== Qualifiers ===
1. (Russia) Nadia Petrova
2. (Ukraine) Elena Tatarkova
3. (Russia) Anastasia Myskina
4. (Russia) Elena Dementieva

=== Lucky loser ===
1. (United States) Kimberly Po

== Qualifying draw ==
=== Key ===
- Q = Qualifier
- WC = Wild card
- LL = Lucky loser
- Alt = Alternate
- SE = Special exempt
- PR = Protected ranking
- ITF = ITF entry
- JE = Junior exempt
- w/o = Walkover
- r = Retired
- d = Defaulted
- SR = Special ranking

=== First qualifier ===
First round
1	(Canada) Maureen Drake	2	1
(Russia) Nadia Petrova	6	6
(Germany) Caroline Schneider	6	4	2
(Italy) Germana Di Natale	3	6	6
(Russia) Irina Kornienko	4	4
(Russia) Ekaterina Sysoeva	6	6
(Czech Republic) Michaela Paštiková	7^{8}	3	1
8	(United States) Kimberly Po	6^{6}	6	6

Second round
(Russia) Nadia Petrova	6	6
(Italy) Germana Di Natale	2	0
(Russia) Ekaterina Sysoeva	4	2
8	(United States) Kimberly Po	6	6

Qualifying competition
(Russia) Nadia Petrova	6	6
8	(United States) Kimberly Po	3	3

=== Second qualifier ===
First round
4	(Switzerland) Miroslava Vavrinec	4	1
(Russia) Elena Makarova	6	6
(Germany) Angelika Bachmann	6	6
WC	(Russia) Julia Oussanova	4	2
WC	(Russia) Goulnara Fattakhetdinova	3	6	2
(Germany) Marketa Kochta	6	3	6
(United States) Tracy Singian	4	3
6	(Ukraine) Elena Tatarkova	6	6

Second round
(Russia) Elena Makarova	7^{7}	6
(Germany) Angelika Bachmann	6^{3}	2
(Germany) Marketa Kochta	4	0
6	(Ukraine) Elena Tatarkova	6	6

Qualifying competition
(Russia) Elena Makarova	2	3
6	(Ukraine) Elena Tatarkova	6	6

=== Third qualifier ===
First round
7	(Romania) Cătălina Cristea	6	7
(Czech Republic) Milena Nekvapilová	3	5
(Bulgaria) Svetlana Krivencheva	3	1
WC	(Russia) Galina Fokina	6	6
(Germany) Nina Nittinger	3	0
(Ukraine) Anna Zaporozhanova	6	6
(Germany) Vanessa Henke	4	6^{5}
3	(Russia) Anastasia Myskina	6	7^{7}

Second round
7	(Romania) Cătălina Cristea	7^{11}	2	4
WC	(Russia) Galina Fokina	6^{9}	6	6
(Ukraine) Anna Zaporozhanova	3	6	1
3	(Russia) Anastasia Myskina	6	4	6

Qualifying competition
WC	(Russia) Galina Fokina	4	7	5
3	(Russia) Anastasia Myskina	6	5	7

=== Fourth qualifier ===
First round
Alt	(Belarus) Tatiana Poutchek	6^{6}	5
(Russia) Alina Jidkova	7^{8}	7
WC	(Russia) Natalia Egorova	3	1
(Russia) Maria Goloviznina	6	6
(Belarus) Nadejda Ostrovskaya	6	6
(Hungary) Nóra Köves	2	0
(Ukraine) Tatiana Perebiynis	0	1
2	(Russia) Elena Dementieva	6	6

Second round
(Russia) Alina Jidkova	3	0
(Russia) Maria Goloviznina	6	6
(Belarus) Nadejda Ostrovskaya	3	2
2	(Russia) Elena Dementieva	6	6

Qualifying competition
(Russia) Maria Goloviznina	4	4
2	(Russia) Elena Dementieva	6	6
