= 2000 Kremlin Cup – Women's doubles =

Women's doubles
- 2000 Kremlin Cup

Final
- Champions: (France) Julie Halard-Decugis (Japan) Ai Sugiyama
- Runners-up: (Switzerland) Martina Hingis (Russia) Anna Kournikova
- Score: 4–6, 6–4, 7–6^{(7–5)}

Details
- Draw: 16 (1WC/1Q)
- Seeds: 4

Events
Singles	men	women
Doubles	men	women
← 1999 ·	Kremlin Cup	· 2001 →

Lisa Raymond and Rennae Stubbs were the defending champions, but lost in semifinals to tournament winners Julie Halard-Decugis and Ai Sugiyama.

Halard-Decugis and Sugiyama won the title by defeating Martina Hingis and Anna Kournikova 4–6, 6–4, 7–6^{(7–5)} in the final.

== Seeds ==
1. (France) Julie Halard-Decugis / (Japan) Ai Sugiyama (champions)
2. (Switzerland) Martina Hingis / (Russia) Anna Kournikova (final)
3. (United States) Lisa Raymond / (Australia) Rennae Stubbs (semifinals)
4. (France) Alexandra Fusai / (France) Nathalie Tauziat (semifinals)

== Draw ==
=== Key ===
- Q = Qualifier
- WC = Wild card
- LL = Lucky loser
- Alt = Alternate
- SE = Special exempt
- PR = Protected ranking
- ITF = ITF entry
- JE = Junior exempt
- w/o = Walkover
- r = Retired
- d = Defaulted
- SR = Special ranking

=== Draw ===
First round
1	(France) J Halard-Decugis (Japan) A Sugiyama	2	6	6
(Australia) J Dokić (Russia) E Likhovtseva	6	3	2
(United States) N Arendt (Netherlands) M Bollegraf	3	6^{3}
(Argentina) L Montalvo (Spain) M Serna	6	7
3	(United States) L Raymond (Australia) R Stubbs	7	6
(Russia) E Kulikovskaya (Hungary) K Marosi-Aracama	5	4
(Slovakia) J Husárová (Bulgaria) M Maleeva	6^{3}	4
(Belarus) T Poutchek (Slovenia) P Rampre	7	6
(France) A Mauresmo (Spain) A Sánchez Vicario	6	5	3
WC	(Russia) E Dementieva (Russia) L Krasnoroutskaya	4	7	6
(Italy) S Farina Elia (Slovenia) T Križan	1	3
4	(France) A Fusai (France) N Tauziat	6	6
(Russia) A Jidkova (Switzerland) P Schnyder	2	6	7
Q	(Russia) E Bovina (Russia) T Panova	6	4	5
(Belgium) S Appelmans (Canada) S Jeyaseelan	2	0
2	(Switzerland) M Hingis (Russia) A Kournikova	6	6

Quarterfinals
1	(France) J Halard-Decugis (Japan) A Sugiyama	6	7
(Argentina) L Montalvo (Spain) M Serna	4	5
3	(United States) L Raymond (Australia) R Stubbs	6	6
(Belarus) T Poutchek (Slovenia) P Rampre	1	3
WC	(Russia) E Dementieva (Russia) L Krasnoroutskaya	6	1	1
4	(France) A Fusai (France) N Tauziat	4	6	6
(Russia) A Jidkova (Switzerland) P Schnyder	3	1
2	(Switzerland) M Hingis (Russia) A Kournikova	6	6

Semifinals
1	(France) J Halard-Decugis (Japan) A Sugiyama	7	6
3	(United States) L Raymond (Australia) R Stubbs	5	2
4	(France) A Fusai (France) N Tauziat	3	0
2	(Switzerland) M Hingis (Russia) A Kournikova	6	6

Final
1	(France) J Halard-Decugis (Japan) A Sugiyama	4	6	7
2	(Switzerland) M Hingis (Russia) A Kournikova	6	4	6^{5}

== Qualifying ==
=== Qualifying seeds ===
1. (Germany) Andrea Glass / (Germany) Bianka Lamade (first round)
2. (Belarus) Nadejda Ostrovskaya / (Ukraine) Anna Zaporozhanova (qualifying competition)

=== Qualifiers ===
1. (Russia) Elena Bovina / (Russia) Tatiana Panova

=== Qualifying draw ===
First round
1	(Germany) Andrea Glass (Germany) Bianka Lamade	7
WC	(Russia) Elena Bovina (Russia) Tatiana Panova	9
(Germany) Vanessa Henke (Bulgaria) Svetlana Krivencheva	4
2	(Belarus) Nadejda Ostrovskaya (Ukraine) Anna Zaporozhanova	8

Qualifying competition
WC	(Russia) Elena Bovina (Russia) Tatiana Panova	6	6	–
2	(Belarus) Nadejda Ostrovskaya (Ukraine) Anna Zaporozhanova	4	2	–
