= 2002 US Open – Women's doubles =

Women's doubles
- 2002 US Open

Final
- Champions: (Spain) Virginia Ruano Pascual (Argentina) Paola Suárez
- Runners-up: (Russia) Elena Dementieva (Slovakia) Janette Husárová
- Score: 6–2, 6–1

Details
- Draw: 64 (7 WC )
- Seeds: 16

Events
Singles	men	women		boys	girls
Doubles	men	women	mixed	boys	girls
WC Singles	men	women	quad
WC Doubles	men	women	quad
Legends	men	women	mixed
← 2001 ·	US Open	· 2003 →

Lisa Raymond and Rennae Stubbs were the defending champions, but lost in third round to Kim Clijsters and Meghann Shaughnessy.

Virginia Ruano Pascual and Paola Suárez won the title, defeating Elena Dementieva and Janette Husárová 6–2, 6–1 in the final. It was the 1st doubles Grand Slam title and the 6th doubles title in the year for the pair. It was also the 16th doubles title overall for Ruano Pascual and the 24th doubles title overall for Suárez, in their respective careers.

== Seeds ==
1. (United States) Lisa Raymond / (Australia) Rennae Stubbs (third round)
2. (Spain) Virginia Ruano Pascual / (Argentina) Paola Suárez (champions)
3. (Zimbabwe) Cara Black / (Russia) Elena Likhovtseva (semifinals)
4. (Slovakia) Daniela Hantuchová / (Spain) Arantxa Sánchez Vicario (first round)
5. (Switzerland) Martina Hingis / (Russia) Anna Kournikova (quarterfinals)
6. (Russia) Elena Dementieva / (Slovakia) Janette Husárová (final)
7. (Belgium) Els Callens / (Italy) Roberta Vinci (first round)
8. (Australia) Nicole Arendt / (South Africa) Liezel Huber (second round)
9. (Slovenia) Tina Križan / (Slovenia) Katarina Srebotnik (first round)
10. (Italy) Silvia Farina Elia / (Austria) Barbara Schett (first round)
11. (Chinese Taipei) Janet Lee / (Indonesia) Wynne Prakusya (second round)
12. (South Africa) Amanda Coetzer / (United States) Lori McNeil (first round)
13. (Germany) Barbara Rittner / (Spain) Magüi Serna (first round)
14. (Czech Republic) Dája Bedáňová / (Russia) Elena Bovina (first round)
15. (Belgium) Kim Clijsters / (United States) Meghann Shaughnessy (quarterfinals)
16. (Argentina) María Emilia Salerni / (Sweden) Åsa Svensson (third round)

== Draw ==
=== Key ===
- Q = Qualifier
- WC = Wild card
- LL = Lucky loser
- Alt = Alternate
- ITF = ITF entry
- PR = Protected ranking
- SR = Special ranking
- SE = Special exempt
- JE = Junior exempt
- JR = Junior Accelerator Programme entrant
- CO = College Accelerator Programme entrant
- NG = Next Gen Accelerator Program entrant
- w/o = Walkover
- r = Retired
- d = Defaulted

=== Finals ===
Quarterfinals
15	(Belgium) Kim Clijsters (United States) Meghann Shaughnessy	4	3
6	(Russia) Elena Dementieva (Slovakia) Janette Husárová	6	6
3	(Zimbabwe) Cara Black (Russia) Elena Likhovtseva	3	6	6
(United States) Corina Morariu (United States) Kimberly Po-Messerli	6	3	4
(Russia) Nadia Petrova (Australia) Nicole Pratt	6	6
(Switzerland) Emmanuelle Gagliardi (Slovakia) Henrieta Nagyová	4	3
5	(Switzerland) Martina Hingis (Russia) Anna Kournikova	3	3
2	(Spain) Virginia Ruano Pascual (Argentina) Paola Suárez	6	6

Semifinals
6	(Russia) Elena Dementieva (Slovakia) Janette Husárová	7	6
3	(Zimbabwe) Cara Black (Russia) Elena Likhovtseva	5	1
(Russia) Nadia Petrova (Australia) Nicole Pratt	1	3
2	(Spain) Virginia Ruano Pascual (Argentina) Paola Suárez	6	6

Final
6	(Russia) Elena Dementieva (Slovakia) Janette Husárová	2	1
2	(Spain) Virginia Ruano Pascual (Argentina) Paola Suárez	6	6

=== Top half ===
==== Section 1 ====
First round
1	(United States) L Raymond (Australia) R Stubbs	6	6
(United States) B Rippner (United States) K Schlukebir	1	0
(South Africa) K Grant (United States) A Spears	2	6	6
(Hungary) P Mandula (Austria) P Wartusch	6	2	3
(Russia) G Fokina (Australia) C Wheeler	1	3
(Argentina) C Fernández (Argentina) P Tarabini	6	6
WC	(United States) L Kalvaria (United States) G Lastra	2	1
15	(Belgium) K Clijsters (United States) M Shaughnessy	6	6
11	(Chinese Taipei) J Lee (Indonesia) W Prakusya	6	6^{5}	6
(Australia) R McQuillan (Australia) L McShea	3	7^{7}	4
(Australia) A Molik (Italy) F Schiavone	6^{4}	5
(United States) M Navratilova (Uzbekistan) I Tulyaganova	7^{7}	7
(Italy) R Grande (Switzerland) P Schnyder	7	6
(Russia) A Rodionova (Germany) M Weingärtner	5	3
(Italy) Ad Serra Zanetti (Italy) An Serra Zanetti	4	1
6	(Russia) E Dementieva (Slovakia) J Husárová	6	6

Second round
1	(United States) L Raymond (Australia) R Stubbs	6	6
(South Africa) K Grant (United States) A Spears	3	3
(Argentina) C Fernández (Argentina) P Tarabini	3	3
15	(Belgium) K Clijsters (United States) M Shaughnessy	6	6
11	(Chinese Taipei) J Lee (Indonesia) W Prakusya	4	3
(United States) M Navratilova (Uzbekistan) I Tulyaganova	6	6
(Italy) R Grande (Switzerland) P Schnyder	3	6^{0}
6	(Russia) E Dementieva (Slovakia) J Husárová	6	7^{7}

Third round
1	(United States) L Raymond (Australia) R Stubbs	4	5
15	(Belgium) K Clijsters (United States) M Shaughnessy	6	7
(United States) M Navratilova (Uzbekistan) I Tulyaganova	4	5
6	(Russia) E Dementieva (Slovakia) J Husárová	6	7

Quarterfinals
15	(Belgium) K Clijsters (United States) M Shaughnessy	4	3
6	(Russia) E Dementieva (Slovakia) J Husárová	6	6

==== Section 2 ====
First round
3	(Zimbabwe) C Black (Russia) E Likhovtseva	6	6
WC	(United States) T Cochran (United States) K Schlukebir	4	3
(France) N Dechy (United States) M Tu	7^{7}	6
(Spain) M Marrero (Germany) M Müller	6^{4}	1
WC	(United States) T Ashley (United States) S Taylor	6	4	6
(Argentina) L Montalvo (Ukraine) E Tatarkova	4	6	4
(Australia) C Barclay (France) E Loit	2	4
16	(Argentina) ME Salerni (Sweden) Å Svensson	6	6
12	(South Africa) A Coetzer (United States) L McNeil	6	5	4
(United States) A Augustus (United States) J Embry	2	7	6
(Bulgaria) L Bacheva (Spain) E Bes	3	4
(Russia) E Kulikovskaya (Russia) E Sysoeva	6	6
(Russia) A Jidkova (Australia) T Musgrave	2	4
(United States) C Morariu (United States) K Po-Messerli	6	6
(South Africa) N de Villiers (Kazakhstan) I Selyutina	6^{4}	6	3
8	(United States) N Arendt (South Africa) L Huber	7^{7}	4	6

Second round
3	(Zimbabwe) C Black (Russia) E Likhovtseva	6	6^{3}	6
(France) N Dechy (United States) M Tu	2	7^{7}	1
WC	(United States) T Ashley (United States) S Taylor	2	6	3
16	(Argentina) ME Salerni (Sweden) Å Svensson	6	1	6
(United States) A Augustus (United States) J Embry	6	6^{5}	6^{4}
(Russia) E Kulikovskaya (Russia) E Sysoeva	1	7^{7}	7^{7}
(United States) C Morariu (United States) K Po-Messerli	6	6
8	(United States) N Arendt (South Africa) L Huber	1	1

Third round
3	(Zimbabwe) C Black (Russia) E Likhovtseva	6	6
16	(Argentina) ME Salerni (Sweden) Å Svensson	3	0
(Russia) E Kulikovskaya (Russia) E Sysoeva	7	1	3
(United States) C Morariu (United States) K Po-Messerli	5	6	6

Quarterfinals
3	(Zimbabwe) C Black (Russia) E Likhovtseva	3	6	6
(United States) C Morariu (United States) K Po-Messerli	6	3	4

=== Bottom half ===
==== Section 3 ====
First round
7	(Belgium) E Callens (Italy) R Vinci	1	6	4
(France) C Dhenin (Slovenia) M Matevzic	6	2	6
(Russia) T Panova (Venezuela) M Vento-Kabchi	3	6^{4}
(Belgium) J Henin (Spain) C Martínez Granados	6	7^{7}
(United States) S Reeves (Austria) B Schwartz	2	3
WC	(United States) M Irvin (United States) A Stevenson	6	6
(Russia) N Petrova (Australia) N Pratt	6	6
10	(Italy) S Farina Elia (Austria) B Schett	1	4
14	(Czech Republic) D Bedáňová (Russia) E Bovina	4	3
(Croatia) I Majoli (Spain) C Martínez	6	6
(Japan) S Asagoe (Japan) N Miyagi	7^{7}	6
(South Africa) N Grandin (Germany) J Wöhr	6^{4}	2
(Italy) T Garbin (Indonesia) A Widjaja	1	4
(Switzerland) E Gagliardi (Slovakia) H Nagyová	6	6
(United States) E deLone (Canada) S Jeyaseelan	6	6
4	(Slovakia) D Hantuchová (Spain) A Sánchez Vicario	2	3

Second round
(France) C Dhenin (Slovenia) M Matevzic	6	7
(Belgium) J Henin (Spain) C Martínez Granados	4	5
WC	(United States) M Irvin (United States) A Stevenson	2	6^{7}
(Russia) N Petrova (Australia) N Pratt	6	7^{9}
(Croatia) I Majoli (Spain) C Martínez	6	1	6
(Japan) S Asagoe (Japan) N Miyagi	2	6	2
(Switzerland) E Gagliardi (Slovakia) H Nagyová	6^{6}	7	7
(United States) E deLone (Canada) S Jeyaseelan	7^{8}	5	5

Third round
(France) C Dhenin (Slovenia) M Matevzic	2	2
(Russia) N Petrova (Australia) N Pratt	6	6
(Croatia) I Majoli (Spain) C Martínez	6^{6}	4
(Switzerland) E Gagliardi (Slovakia) H Nagyová	7^{8}	6

Quarterfinals
(Russia) N Petrova (Australia) N Pratt	6	6
(Switzerland) E Gagliardi (Slovakia) H Nagyová	4	3

==== Section 4 ====
First round
5	(Switzerland) M Hingis (Russia) A Kournikova	7	5	6
(Ukraine) T Perebiynis (Belarus) T Poutchek	5	7	3
WC	(United States) L Granville (United States) J Hopkins	6	6
(Australia) E Dominikovic (South Africa) J Steck	0	3
(Japan) M Saeki (Japan) A Sugiyama	6^{1}	2
(United States) C Rubin (Belarus) N Zvereva	7^{7}	6
(Netherlands) K Boogert (Netherlands) M Oremans	0	6	6
9	(Slovenia) T Križan (Slovenia) S Srebotnik	6	2	3
13	(Germany) B Rittner (Spain) M Serna	1	6	3
WC	(United States) A Cargill (United States) A Harkleroad	6	4	6
(Paraguay) R de los Ríos (Russia) S Kuznetsova	7^{11}	7^{7}
(Germany) A Glass (Czech Republic) K Hrdličková	6^{9}	6^{4}
(France) A Fusai (Netherlands) C Vis	6	6
(Japan) R Hiraki (Croatia) J Kostanić	2	0
WC	(United States) A Baker (United States) B Mattek	2	6^{1}
2	(Spain) V Ruano Pascual (Argentina) P Suárez	6	7^{7}

Second round
5	(Switzerland) M Hingis (Russia) A Kournikova	6	6
WC	(United States) L Granville (United States) J Hopkins	1	2
(United States) C Rubin (Belarus) N Zvereva	6	6
(Netherlands) K Boogert (Netherlands) M Oremans	4	4
WC	(United States) A Cargill (United States) A Harkleroad	6	6
(Paraguay) R de los Ríos (Russia) S Kuznetsova	4	4
(France) A Fusai (Netherlands) C Vis	7	4	1
2	(Spain) V Ruano Pascual (Argentina) P Suárez	5	6	6

Third round
5	(Switzerland) M Hingis (Russia) A Kournikova	6	3	6
(United States) C Rubin (Belarus) N Zvereva	4	6	3
WC	(United States) A Cargill (United States) A Harkleroad	4	2
2	(Spain) V Ruano Pascual (Argentina) P Suárez	6	6

Quarterfinals
5	(Switzerland) M Hingis (Russia) A Kournikova	3	3
2	(Spain) V Ruano Pascual (Argentina) P Suárez	6	6
