= Olga Ivanova (tennis) =

Russian tennis player

Olga Ivanova Ольга Иванова
- Country (sports): Russia
- Born: 3 February 1977 (age 48) Soviet Union
- Turned pro: 1993
- Retired: 1999
- Prize money: $37,649

Singles
- Career record: 83–53
- Career titles: 4 ITF
- Highest ranking: No. 162 (18 December 1995)

Doubles
- Career record: 38–38
- Career titles: 1 ITF
- Highest ranking: No. 203 (28 October 1996)

Team competitions
- Fed Cup: 2–0
Medal record
Representing Russia
Universiade
| Bronze medal – third place | 1995 Fukuoka | Mixed |

Olga Ivanova (Ольга Иванова; born 3 February 1977) is a former Russian tennis player.

Ivanova won four singles and one doubles titles on the ITF tour in her career. On 18 December 1995, she reached her best singles ranking of world number 162. On 7 October 1996, she peaked at world number 627 in the doubles rankings.

Ivanova made her WTA main draw debut at the Kremlin Cup in the doubles event partnering Natalia Egorova.

Playing for Russia at the Fed Cup, Ivanova has accumulated a win–loss record of 2–0.

Egorova retirement from tennis 1999.

== Career statistics ==
=== Singles Finals: 7 (5-2) ===
$100,000 tournaments
$75,000 tournaments
$50,000 tournaments
$25,000 tournaments
$10,000 tournaments

| Outcome | No. | Date | Tournament | Surface | Opponent in the final | Score in the final |
|---|---|---|---|---|---|---|
| Winner | 1. | 17 October 1994 | Moscow, Russia | Hard (i) | (Russia) Ekaterina Sysoeva | 6–2, 7–5 |
| Winner | 2. | 24 October 1994 | Šiauliai, Lithuania | Hard | (Ukraine) Natalia Biletskaya | 7–6^{(9–7)}, 6–3 |
| Winner | 3. | 6 February 1995 | Sheffield, United Kingdom | Hard | (United Kingdom) Lucie Ahl | 6–3, 6–4 |
| Winner | 4. | 20 February 1995 | Newcastle, United Kingdom | Carpet (i) | (Czech Republic) Sandra Kleinová | 6–1, 6–1 |
| Runner-up | 5. | 30 October 1995 | Moscow, Russia | Hard (i) | (Russia) Maria Goloviznina | 2–6, 6–2, 1–6 |
| Runner-up | 6. | 27 April 1997 | San Severo, Italy | Clay | (Romania) Oana Elena Golimbioschi | 3–6, 2–6 |
| Winner | 7. | 31 August 1997 | Kyiv, Ukraine | Clay | (Argentina) Luciana Masante | 6–0, 6–2 |

=== Doubles Finals: 6 (2-4) ===
| Outcome | NO | Date | Tournament | Surface | Partner | Opponents in the final | Score |
|---|---|---|---|---|---|---|---|
| Winner | 1. | 26 September 1994 | Mali Lošinj, Croatia | Clay | (Ukraine) Natalia Nemchinova | (Czech Republic) Blanka Kumbárová (Poland) Aleksandra Olsza | 6–3, 6–7^{(5)}, 7–6^{(5)} |
| Runner-up | 2. | 26 August 1996 | Sochi, Russia | Clay | (Russia) Anna Linkova | (Brazil) Miriam D'Agostini (Dominican Republic) Joelle Schad | 4–6, 3–6 |
| Winner | 3. | 20 October 1996 | Samara, Russia | Carpet (i) | (Russia) Natalia Egorova | (Netherlands) Anique Snijders (Germany) Maja Živec-Škulj | 4–6, 6–2, 6–3 |
| Runner-up | 4. | 20 July 1997 | Darmstadt, Germany | Clay | (Poland) Magdalena Feistel | (Bulgaria) Svetlana Krivencheva (Bulgaria) Pavlina Nola | 0–6, 6–2, 3–6 |
| Runner-up | 5. | 24 August 1997 | Kyiv, Ukraine | Clay | (Russia) Natalia Egorova | (Zimbabwe) Cara Black (Kazakhstan) Irina Selyutina | 2–6, 4–6 |
| Runner-up | 6. | 7 February 1998 | Birkenhead, United Kingdom | Hard (i) | (Russia) Natalia Egorova | (Italy) Giulia Casoni (Ukraine) Anna Zaporozhanova | 3–6, 2–6 |
