= 2000 Kremlin Cup =

- Date: 23–29 October 2000
- Edition: 11th (men) / 5th (women)
- Surface: Carpet / indoor
- Location: Moscow, Russia
- Venue: Olympic Stadium

Champions

Men's singles
- (Russia) Yevgeny Kafelnikov

Women's singles
- (Switzerland) Martina Hingis

Men's doubles
- (Sweden) Jonas Björkman / (Germany) David Prinosil

Women's doubles
- (France) Julie Halard-Decugis / (Japan) Ai Sugiyama
← 1999 ·	Kremlin Cup	· 2001 →

The 2000 Kremlin Cup was a tennis tournament played on indoor carpet courts at the Olympic Stadium in Moscow in Russia that was part of the International Series of the 2000 ATP Tour and of Tier I of the 2000 WTA Tour. The tournament was held from 23 October through 29 October 2000. Yevgeny Kafelnikov and Martina Hingis won the singles title.

== Finals ==
=== Men's singles ===
(Russia) Yevgeny Kafelnikov defeated (Germany) David Prinosil 6–2, 7–5

- It was Kafelnikov's 2nd title of the year and the 22nd of his career.

=== Women's singles ===
(Switzerland) Martina Hingis defeated (Russia) Anna Kournikova 6–3, 6–1

- It was Hingis's 8th title of the year and the 34th of her career.

=== Men's doubles ===
(Sweden) Jonas Björkman / (Germany) David Prinosil defeated (Czech Republic) Jiří Novák / (Czech Republic) David Rikl 6–2, 6–3

- It was Björkman's 1st title of the year and the 21st of his career. It was Prinosil's 2nd title of the year and the 8th of his career.

=== Women's doubles ===
(France) Julie Halard-Decugis / (Japan) Ai Sugiyama defeated (Switzerland) Martina Hingis / (Russia) Anna Kournikova 4–6, 6–4, 7–6(5)

- It was Halard-Decugis's 10th title of the year and the 15th of her career. It was Sugiyama's 7th title of the year and the 16th of her career.
