= 2002 US Open – Mixed doubles =

Mixed doubles
- 2002 US Open

Final
- Champions: (United States) Lisa Raymond (United States) Mike Bryan
- Runners-up: (Slovenia) Katarina Srebotnik (United States) Bob Bryan
- Score: 7–6^{(11–9)}, 7–6^{(7–1)}

Details
- Draw: 32
- Seeds: 8

Events
Singles	men	women		boys	girls
Doubles	men	women	mixed	boys	girls
WC Singles	men	women	quad
WC Doubles	men	women	quad
Legends	men	women	mixed
- US Open

Rennae Stubbs and Todd Woodbridge were the defending champions, but lost in the first round to Martina Navratilova and Leander Paes.

Lisa Raymond and Mike Bryan won the title, defeating Katarina Srebotnik and Bob Bryan 7–6^{(11–9)}, 7–6^{(7–1)} in the final.

== Seeds ==
1. (Australia) Rennae Stubbs / (Australia) Todd Woodbridge (first round)
2. (United States) Lisa Raymond / (United States) Mike Bryan (champions)
3. (Russia) Elena Likhovtseva / (India) Mahesh Bhupathi (second round)
4. (Slovakia) Daniela Hantuchová / (Zimbabwe) Kevin Ullyett (second round, withdrew)
5. (Zimbabwe) Cara Black / (Zimbabwe) Wayne Black (quarterfinals)
6. (United States) Kimberly Po-Messerli / (United States) Donald Johnson (quarterfinals)
7. (Slovakia) Janette Husárová / (Czech Republic) David Rikl (first round)
8. (Russia) Elena Bovina / (The Bahamas) Mark Knowles (quarterfinals)

== Draw ==
Key

- Q = Qualifier
- WC = Wild card
- LL = Lucky loser
- Alt = Alternate
- ITF = ITF entry
- PR = Protected ranking
- SR = Special ranking
- SE = Special exempt
- JE = Junior exempt
- JR = Junior Accelerator Programme entrant
- CO = College Accelerator Programme entrant
- NG = Next Gen Accelerator Program entrant
- w/o = Walkover
- r = Retired
- d = Defaulted

=== Finals ===
Semifinals
(Belgium) Els Callens (South Africa) Robbie Koenig	4	6	6^{4}
(Slovenia) Katarina Srebotnik (United States) Bob Bryan	6	3	7^{7}
WC	(United States) Corina Morariu (United States) Justin Gimelstob	3	3
2	(United States) Lisa Raymond (United States) Mike Bryan	6	6

Final
(Slovenia) Katarina Srebotnik (United States) Bob Bryan	6^{9}	6^{1}
2	(United States) Lisa Raymond (United States) Mike Bryan	7^{11}	7^{7}

=== Top half ===
First round
1	(Australia) R Stubbs (Australia) T Woodbridge	6^{4}	5
(United States) M Navratilova (India) L Paes	7^{7}	7
(Belgium) E Callens (South Africa) R Koenig	6	6
(Argentina) P Tarabini (Australia) M Hill	2	3
(France) C Dhenin (Australia) P Hanley	7^{7}	6
(Slovenia) T Križan (United States) R Leach	6^{5}	4
(Sweden) Å Svensson (Argentina) M García	6^{2}	4
8	(Russia) E Bovina (The Bahamas) M Knowles	7^{7}	6
4	(Slovakia) D Hantuchová (Zimbabwe) K Ullyett	6	6
WC	(United States) J Hopkins (United States) G Oliver	3	2
WC	(United States) M Shaughnessy (United States) R Kendrick	2	3
(Slovenia) K Srebotnik (United States) B Bryan	6	6
(United States) N Arendt (Argentina) G Etlis	2	7^{9}	7^{10}
(Chinese Taipei) J Lee (South Africa) D Adams	6	6^{7}	6^{8}
(United States) K Schlukebir (Australia) D Macpherson	4	4
6	(United States) K Po-Messerli (United States) D Johnson	6	6

Second round
(United States) M Navratilova (India) L Paes	6^{5}	4
(Belgium) E Callens (South Africa) R Koenig	7^{7}	6
(France) C Dhenin (Australia) P Hanley	5	6	6^{8}
8	(Russia) E Bovina (The Bahamas) M Knowles	7	4	7^{10}
4	(Slovakia) D Hantuchová (Zimbabwe) K Ullyett
(Slovenia) K Srebotnik (United States) B Bryan	w/o
(United States) N Arendt (Argentina) G Etlis	6^{5}	2
6	(United States) K Po-Messerli (United States) D Johnson	7^{7}	6

Quarterfinals
(Belgium) E Callens (South Africa) R Koenig	6	1	7^{12}
8	(Russia) E Bovina (The Bahamas) M Knowles	3	6	6^{10}
(Slovenia) K Srebotnik (United States) B Bryan	6	6
6	(United States) K Po-Messerli (United States) D Johnson	2	0

Semifinals
(Belgium) E Callens (South Africa) R Koenig	4	6	6^{4}
(Slovenia) K Srebotnik (United States) B Bryan	6	3	7^{7}

=== Bottom half ===
First round
7	(Slovakia) J Husárová (Czech Republic) D Rikl	4	5
Alt	(Hungary) P Mandula (Israel) A Hadad	6	7
WC	(United States) J Lehnhoff (United States) J Morrison	3	6	6^{7}
WC	(United States) A Stevenson (United States) J Tarango	6	3	7^{9}
(Australia) C Barclay (Japan) T Shimada	4	1
WC	(United States) C Morariu (United States) J Gimelstob	6	6
(Uzbekistan) I Tulyaganova (Czech Republic) C Suk	6	3	6^{7}
3	(Russia) E Likhovtseva (India) M Bhupathi	4	6	7^{9}
5	(Zimbabwe) C Black (Zimbabwe) W Black	6	6
(South Africa) A Coetzer (United States) B MacPhie	4	4
(South Africa) N de Villiers (South Africa) E Ferreira	6	7
Alt	(South Africa) K Grant (South Africa) J Coetzee	4	5
(Argentina) P Suárez (Argentina) M Rodríguez	6	2	6^{6}
(United States) A Spears (Australia) N Healey	4	6	7^{8}
(Australia) N Pratt (Australia) A Kratzmann	4	2
2	(United States) L Raymond (United States) M Bryan	6	6

Second round
Alt	(Hungary) P Mandula (Israel) A Hadad	6	6
WC	(United States) A Stevenson (United States) J Tarango	2	4
WC	(United States) C Morariu (United States) J Gimelstob	6	6^{5}	7^{7}
3	(Russia) E Likhovtseva (India) M Bhupathi	4	7^{7}	6^{4}
5	(Zimbabwe) C Black (Zimbabwe) W Black	6	6
(South Africa) N de Villiers (South Africa) E Ferreira	4	2
(United States) A Spears (Australia) N Healey	2	3
2	(United States) L Raymond (United States) M Bryan	6	6

Quarterfinals
Alt	(Hungary) P Mandula (Israel) A Hadad	6	6^{5}	6^{10}
WC	(United States) C Morariu (United States) J Gimelstob	4	7^{7}	7^{12}
5	(Zimbabwe) C Black (Zimbabwe) W Black	3	4
2	(United States) L Raymond (United States) M Bryan	6	6

Semifinals
WC	(United States) C Morariu (United States) J Gimelstob	3	3
2	(United States) L Raymond (United States) M Bryan	6	6
