= 1999 Kremlin Cup – Men's doubles =

Men's doubles
- 1999 Kremlin Cup

Final
- Champions: (United States) Justin Gimelstob (Czech Republic) Daniel Vacek
- Runners-up: (Ukraine) Andriy Medvedev (Russia) Marat Safin
- Score: 6–2, 6–1

Details
- Draw: 16
- Seeds: 4

Events
Singles	men	women
Doubles	men	women
← 1998 ·	Kremlin Cup	· 2000 →

Jared Palmer and Jeff Tarango were the defending champions, but Palmer did not participate this year. Tarango partnered Yevgeny Kafelnikov, losing in the first round.

Justin Gimelstob and Daniel Vacek won the title, defeating Andriy Medvedev and Marat Safin 6–2, 6–1 in the final.

== Seeds ==
1. (South Africa) David Adams / (South Africa) John-Laffnie de Jager (quarterfinals)
2. (Russia) Andrei Olhovskiy / (Germany) David Prinosil (quarterfinals)
3. (France) Olivier Delaître / (France) Fabrice Santoro (first round)
4. (United States) Justin Gimelstob / (Czech Republic) Daniel Vacek (champions)

== Draw ==
=== Key ===
- Q = Qualifier
- WC = Wild card
- LL = Lucky loser
- Alt = Alternate
- ITF = ITF entry
- PR = Protected ranking
- SR = Special ranking
- SE = Special exempt
- JE = Junior exempt
- JR = Junior Accelerator Programme entrant
- CO = College Accelerator Programme entrant
- NG = Next Gen Accelerator Program entrant
- w/o = Walkover
- r = Retired
- d = Defaulted

=== Draw ===
First round
1	(South Africa) D Adams (South Africa) J-L de Jager	7	3	6
(North Macedonia) A Kitinov (Federal Republic of Yugoslavia) N Zimonjić	6	6	4
(Germany) M Commandeur (Belarus) A Shvets	3	2
(Czech Republic) J Novák (Czech Republic) D Rikl	6	6
4	(United States) J Gimelstob (Czech Republic) D Vacek	6	7^{13}
(Spain) T Carbonell (Spain) J Sánchez	5	6^{11}
(Czech Republic) P Pála (Czech Republic) P Vízner	5
(The Bahamas) M Knowles (Canada) D Nestor	5^{r}
WC	(Ukraine) A Medvedev (Russia) M Safin	6	3	6
WC	(Russia) A Cherkasov (Russia) M Youzhny	2	6	1
Q	(Romania) A Pavel (Switzerland) M Rosset	6	6
3	(France) O Delaître (France) F Santoro	4	1
(South Africa) M Barnard (United States) J Waite	6^{3}	2
(Czech Republic) M Damm (Belarus) M Mirnyi	7^{7}	6
(Russia) Y Kafelnikov (United States) J Tarango	6^{7}	6	4
2	(Russia) A Olhovskiy (Germany) D Prinosil	7^{9}	3	6

Quarterfinals
1	(South Africa) D Adams (South Africa) J-L de Jager	6^{3}	6^{9}
(Czech Republic) J Novák (Czech Republic) D Rikl	7^{7}	7^{11}
4	(United States) J Gimelstob (Czech Republic) D Vacek	6	6
(Czech Republic) P Pála (Czech Republic) P Vízner	2	4
WC	(Ukraine) A Medvedev (Russia) M Safin	7^{7}	6^{6}	6
Q	(Romania) A Pavel (Switzerland) M Rosset	6^{3}	7^{8}	2
(Czech Republic) M Damm (Belarus) M Mirnyi	6^{11}	6	6
2	(Russia) A Olhovskiy (Germany) D Prinosil	7^{13}	3	4

Semifinals
(Czech Republic) J Novák (Czech Republic) D Rikl	3	4
4	(United States) J Gimelstob (Czech Republic) D Vacek	6	6
WC	(Ukraine) A Medvedev (Russia) M Safin	3	6	6
(Czech Republic) M Damm (Belarus) M Mirnyi	6	4	4

Final
4	(United States) J Gimelstob (Czech Republic) D Vacek	6	6
WC	(Ukraine) A Medvedev (Russia) M Safin	2	1
