= 2000 Kremlin Cup – Men's singles =

Men's singles
- 2000 Kremlin Cup

Final
- Champion: (Russia) Yevgeny Kafelnikov
- Runner-up: (Germany) David Prinosil
- Score: 6–2, 7–5

Details
- Draw: 32 (4 Q / 3 WC / 3 LL )
- Seeds: 8

Events
Singles	men	women
Doubles	men	women
← 1999 ·	Kremlin Cup	· 2001 →

Yevgeny Kafelnikov was the defending champion and won in the final 6–2, 7–5 against David Prinosil.

== Seeds ==
1. (Russia) Marat Safin (semifinals)
2. (Russia) Yevgeny Kafelnikov (champion)
3. (Netherlands) ~~Sjeng Schalken~~ (withdrew)
4. (Switzerland) Marc Rosset (semifinals)
5. (France) Fabrice Santoro (first round)
6. (Belarus) Max Mirnyi (second round)
7. (Spain) Fernando Vicente (first round)
8. (Czech Republic) Jiří Novák (second round)

== Draw ==
=== Key ===
- Q = Qualifier
- WC = Wild card
- LL = Lucky loser
- Alt = Alternate
- SE = Special exempt
- PR = Protected ranking
- ITF = ITF entry
- JE = Junior exempt
- w/o = Walkover
- r = Retired
- d = Defaulted
- SR = Special ranking

=== Finals ===
Semifinals
1	(Russia) Marat Safin	7^{7}	3	3
(Germany) David Prinosil	6^{4}	6	6
4	(Switzerland) Marc Rosset	6	2	5
2	(Russia) Yevgeny Kafelnikov	4	6	7

Final
(Germany) David Prinosil	2	5
2	(Russia) Yevgeny Kafelnikov	6	7

=== Top half ===
First round
1	(Russia) M Safin	6	6
(Germany) R Schüttler	4	4
(Austria) S Koubek	6	1	2
(Italy) G Pozzi	3	6	6
(Australia) A Ilie	6	6
LL	(Germany) B Phau	1	2
(Belarus) V Voltchkov	7	4	6
7	(Spain) F Vicente	5	6	3
LL	(Canada) D Nestor	7^{7}	3	3
(Germany) D Prinosil	6^{5}	6	6
(Israel) H Levy	6	6
(Norway) C Ruud	4	1
LL	(Finland) T Ketola	2	5
(Sweden) J Björkman	6	7
Q	(Denmark) K Pless	6^{8}	1
6	(Belarus) M Mirnyi	7^{10}	6

Second round
1	(Russia) M Safin	6	7
(Italy) G Pozzi	1	5
(Australia) A Ilie	5	6	4
(Belarus) V Voltchkov	7	4	6
(Germany) D Prinosil	6	6
(Israel) H Levy	3	0
(Sweden) J Björkman	6	3	6
6	(Belarus) M Mirnyi	3	6	1

Quarterfinals
1	(Russia) M Safin	7^{7}	6
(Belarus) V Voltchkov	6^{5}	1
(Germany) D Prinosil	7^{7}	5	7^{7}
(Sweden) J Björkman	6^{3}	7	6^{5}

Semifinals
1	(Russia) M Safin	7^{7}	3	3
(Germany) D Prinosil	6^{4}	6	6

=== Bottom half ===
First round
5	(France) F Santoro	4	2
WC	(Russia) M Youzhny	6	6
(Sweden) T Johansson	6	4	6
(Spain) A Portas	3	6	4
(Spain) F Clavet	4	4
(Sweden) M Gustafsson	6	6
WC	(Russia) A Cherkasov	2	4
4	(Switzerland) M Rosset	6	6
8	(Czech Republic) J Novák	3	6	6
Q	(Croatia) G Ivanišević	6	3	4
Q	(Germany) L Burgsmüller	2	0
(Czech Republic) M Damm	6	1^{r}
Q	(Slovakia) J Krošlák	7^{7}	3	4
(Spain) A Martín	6^{3}	6	6
WC	(Russia) D Golovanov	6^{4}	4
2	(Russia) Y Kafelnikov	7^{7}	6

Second round
WC	(Russia) M Youzhny	4	6	7^{7}
(Sweden) T Johansson	6	2	6^{5}
(Sweden) M Gustafsson	3	4
4	(Switzerland) M Rosset	6	6
8	(Czech Republic) J Novák	7	1	3
Q	(Germany) L Burgsmüller	5	6	6
(Spain) A Martín	3	1
2	(Russia) Y Kafelnikov	6	6

Quarterfinals
WC	(Russia) M Youzhny	7^{7}	4	6^{2}
4	(Switzerland) M Rosset	6^{2}	6	7^{7}
Q	(Germany) L Burgsmüller	3	2
2	(Russia) Y Kafelnikov	6	6

Semifinals
4	(Switzerland) M Rosset	6	2	5
2	(Russia) Y Kafelnikov	4	6	7

== Qualifying ==
=== Qualifying seeds ===
1. (Czech Republic) Bohdan Ulihrach (first round)
2. (Armenia) Sargis Sargsian (first round)
3. (Czech Republic) Michal Tabara (first round)
4. (Netherlands) Jan Siemerink (first round)
5. (Croatia) Goran Ivanišević (qualified)
6. (Finland) Tuomas Ketola (qualifying competition, lucky loser)
7. (Zimbabwe) Kevin Ullyett (second round)
8. (Slovakia) Ján Krošlák (qualified)

=== Qualifiers ===
1. (Denmark) Kristian Pless
2. (Slovakia) Ján Krošlák
3. (Germany) Lars Burgsmüller
4. (Croatia) Goran Ivanišević

=== Lucky losers ===
1. (Finland) Tuomas Ketola
2. (Germany) Björn Phau
3. (Canada) Daniel Nestor

=== Qualifying draw ===
==== First qualifier ====
First round
1	(Czech Republic) Bohdan Ulihrach	5	1
(Russia) Igor Kunitsyn	7	6
(Romania) Ion Moldovan	6	4	6
WC	(Russia) Filip Moukhametov	4	6	3
(Israel) Noam Okun	6	3	4
(Denmark) Kristian Pless	2	6	6
(Romania) Răzvan Sabău	3	6	2
7	(Zimbabwe) Kevin Ullyett	6	4	6

Second round
(Russia) Igor Kunitsyn	4	7	3
(Romania) Ion Moldovan	6	5	6
(Denmark) Kristian Pless	7	6
7	(Zimbabwe) Kevin Ullyett	5	4

Qualifying competition
(Romania) Ion Moldovan	3	4
(Denmark) Kristian Pless	6	6

==== Second qualifier ====
First round
2	(Armenia) Sargis Sargsian	3	3
(Canada) Daniel Nestor	6	6
(Czech Republic) Radek Štěpánek	6^{4}	6	6
(Russia) Artem Derepasko	7^{7}	2	1
(Belarus) Alexander Shvets	6	3	4
(Federal Republic of Yugoslavia) Nenad Zimonjić	2	6	6
WC	(Russia) Kirill Ivanov-Smolensky	3	4
8	(Slovakia) Ján Krošlák	6	6

Second round
(Canada) Daniel Nestor	7^{7}	6
(Czech Republic) Radek Štěpánek	6^{3}	3
(Federal Republic of Yugoslavia) Nenad Zimonjić	3	6	1
8	(Slovakia) Ján Krošlák	6	1	6

Qualifying competition
(Canada) Daniel Nestor	3	6	5
8	(Slovakia) Ján Krošlák	6	1	7

==== Third qualifier ====
First round
3	(Czech Republic) Michal Tabara	6	4	6^{3}
(Russia) Dmitry Vlasov	2	6	7^{7}
(Germany) Lars Burgsmüller	6	6
(United States) Taylor Dent	2	3
(Australia) Paul Kilderry	6	6
(Uzbekistan) Oleg Ogorodov	4	2
(Uzbekistan) Vadim Kutsenko	0	1
6	(Finland) Tuomas Ketola	6	6

Second round
(Russia) Dmitry Vlasov	2	6	4
(Germany) Lars Burgsmüller	6	3	6
(Australia) Paul Kilderry	3	4
6	(Finland) Tuomas Ketola	6	6

Qualifying competition
(Germany) Lars Burgsmüller	7^{7}	2	6
6	(Finland) Tuomas Ketola	6^{3}	6	3

==== Fourth qualifier ====
First round
4	(Netherlands) Jan Siemerink	1	6^{5}
(France) Julien Benneteau	6	7^{7}
WC	(Russia) Pavel Ivanov	2	6^{3}
(Germany) Björn Phau	6	7^{7}
(Israel) Nir Welgreen	5	2
(Sweden) Nicklas Kulti	7	6
WC	(Russia) Alex Bogomolov Jr.	1	1
5	(Croatia) Goran Ivanišević	6	6

Second round
(France) Julien Benneteau	2	5
(Germany) Björn Phau	6	7
(Sweden) Nicklas Kulti	6^{3}	4
5	(Croatia) Goran Ivanišević	7^{7}	6

Qualifying competition
(Germany) Björn Phau	3	6^{7}
5	(Croatia) Goran Ivanišević	6	7^{9}
