= 2000 Kremlin Cup – Men's doubles =

Men's doubles
- 2000 Kremlin Cup

Final
- Champions: (Sweden) Jonas Björkman (Germany) David Prinosil
- Runners-up: (Czech Republic) Jiří Novák (Czech Republic) David Rikl
- Score: 6–2, 6–3

Details
- Draw: 16 (3WC/1Q)
- Seeds: 4

Events
| Singles | men | women |
| Doubles | men | women |
- Kremlin Cup

Justin Gimelstob and Daniel Vacek were the defending champions, but did not participate this year.

Jonas Björkman and David Prinosil won the title, defeating Jiří Novák and David Rikl 6–2, 6–3 in the final.

== Seeds ==
1. (Czech Republic) Jiří Novák / (Czech Republic) David Rikl (final)
2. (Australia) Joshua Eagle / (Australia) Andrew Florent (first round)
3. (Russia) Yevgeny Kafelnikov / (Federal Republic of Yugoslavia) Nenad Zimonjić (first round)
4. (Canada) Daniel Nestor / (Zimbabwe) Kevin Ullyett (semifinals)

== Draw ==
Key

- Q = Qualifier
- WC = Wild card
- LL = Lucky loser
- Alt = Alternate
- ITF = ITF entry
- PR = Protected ranking
- SR = Special ranking
- SE = Special exempt
- JE = Junior exempt
- JR = Junior Accelerator Programme entrant
- CO = College Accelerator Programme entrant
- NG = Next Gen Accelerator Program entrant
- w/o = Walkover
- r = Retired
- d = Defaulted

=== Draw ===
First round
1 | (Czech Republic) J Novák (Czech Republic) D Rikl | 6 | 6
(Spain) Á López Morón (Spain) J Velasco Jr. | 2 | 2
WC | (Russia) A Olhovskiy (Russia) M Youzhny | 6 | 6
(Argentina) L Arnold (Argentina) D Orsanic | 1 | 4
4 | (Canada) D Nestor (Zimbabwe) K Ullyett | 6 | 6
(Spain) JI Carrasco (Australia) P Tramacchi | 3 | 4
WC | (Germany) M Commandeur (Germany) R Schüttler | 3 | 0
(South Africa) M Barnard (South Africa) R Koenig | 6 | 6
(Sweden) S Aspelin (Sweden) J Landsberg | 3 | 7^{7} | 6
(Czech Republic) M Damm (Czech Republic) C Suk | 6 | 6^{5} | 4
WC | (Russia) D Golovanov (Russia) M Safin | 6 | 3 | 7^{7}
3 | (Russia) Y Kafelnikov (Federal Republic of Yugoslavia) N Zimonjić | 4 | 6 | 6^{5}
(Sweden) F Bergh (Sweden) N Kulti | 4 | 0
Q | (Australia) P Kilderry (Switzerland) M Rosset | 6 | 6
(Sweden) J Björkman (Germany) D Prinosil | 6 | 6
2 | (Australia) J Eagle (Australia) A Florent | 3 | 4

Quarterfinals
1 | (Czech Republic) J Novák (Czech Republic) D Rikl | 6 | 6
WC | (Russia) A Olhovskiy (Russia) M Youzhny | 3 | 4
4 | (Canada) D Nestor (Zimbabwe) K Ullyett | 6 | 6
(South Africa) M Barnard (South Africa) R Koenig | 4 | 4
(Sweden) S Aspelin (Sweden) J Landsberg | 6^{4} | 6 | 4
WC | (Russia) D Golovanov (Russia) M Safin | 7^{7} | 3 | 6
Q | (Australia) P Kilderry (Switzerland) M Rosset | 1 | 4
(Sweden) J Björkman (Germany) D Prinosil | 6 | 6

Semifinals
1 | (Czech Republic) J Novák (Czech Republic) D Rikl | 6 | 4 | 7^{7}
4 | (Canada) D Nestor (Zimbabwe) K Ullyett | 4 | 6 | 6^{5}
WC | (Russia) D Golovanov (Russia) M Safin | 4 | 0
(Sweden) J Björkman (Germany) D Prinosil | 6 | 6

Final
1 | (Czech Republic) J Novák (Czech Republic) D Rikl | 2 | 3
(Sweden) J Björkman (Germany) D Prinosil | 6 | 6

== Qualifying ==
=== Qualifying seeds ===
1. (Australia) Paul Kilderry / (Switzerland) Marc Rosset (qualified)
2. (Germany) Lars Burgsmüller / (North Macedonia) Aleksandar Kitinov (first round)

=== Qualifiers ===
1. (Australia) Paul Kilderry / (Switzerland) Marc Rosset

=== Qualifying draw ===
First round
1 | (Australia) Paul Kilderry (Switzerland) Marc Rosset | 6 | 6
WC | (Croatia) Goran Ivanišević (Hungary) Sándor Noszály | 3 | 4
(Israel) Harel Levy (Spain) Alberto Martín | 6 | 6
2 | (Germany) Lars Burgsmüller (North Macedonia) Aleksandar Kitinov | 2 | 0

Qualifying competition
1 | (Australia) Paul Kilderry (Switzerland) Marc Rosset | 6 | 6
(Israel) Harel Levy (Spain) Alberto Martín | 4 | 4
