= Angelika Bachmann =

German tennis player

- Country (sports): Germany
- Born: 16 May 1979 (age 46) Munich, Germany
- Height: 1.74 m (5 ft 8 1/2 in)
- Turned pro: 1998
- Retired: 2010
- Plays: Right-handed (two-handed backhand)
- Prize money: 422,119

Singles
- Career record: 309–290
- Career titles: 0 WTA, 2 ITF
- Highest ranking: 130 (17 April 2000)

Grand Slam singles results
- Australian Open: 1R (2004, 2008)
- French Open: 1R (2000)
- Wimbledon: Q3 (2000)
- US Open: 1R (2000)

Doubles
- Career record: 140–140
- Career titles: 0 WTA, 7 ITF
- Highest ranking: 90 (18 December 2000)

Grand Slam doubles results
- Australian Open: 1R (2001)
- French Open: 1R (2000, 2001)
- Wimbledon: 2R (2000)
- US Open: 1R (2000)

Angelika Bachmann (born 16 May 1979) is a German former professional tennis player. Her highest WTA singles ranking is 130th, which she reached on 17 April 2000. Her career high in doubles of world no. 90 set on 18 December 2000. Angelika Bachmann retired from tennis 2010.

== ITF finals ==
=== Singles: 5 (2–3) ===
Legend
$100,000 tournaments
$75,000 tournaments
$50,000 tournaments
$25,000 tournaments
$10,000 tournaments

Outcome	No.	Date	Tournament	Surface	Opponent	Score
Runner-up	1.	1 March 1999	Büchen, Germany	Carpet	(Germany) Vanessa Henke	2–6, 6–4, 6–2
Winner	2.	1 October 2001	Plzeň, Czech Republic	Clay	(Czech Republic) Renata Kučerová	6–2, 3–6, 6–2
Runner-up	3.	3 February 2002	Urtijëi, Italy	Carpet	(Italy) Flavia Pennetta	7–6, 3–6, 6–3
Winner	4.	28 July 2003	Pétange, Luxembourg	Clay	(Germany) Bianka Lamade	6–4, 7–6^{(9–7)}
Runner-up	5.	1 May 2007	Charlottesville, Italy	Clay	(Romania) Edina Gallovits-Hall	6–3, 6–3

=== Doubles: 20 (7–13) ===
Outcome	No.	Date	Tournament	Surface	Partner	Opponents	Score
Runner-up	1.	15 December 1997	Cascais, Portugal	Clay	(Romania) Magda Mihalache	(Belgium) Kirstin Freye (Poland) Anna Bieleń-Żarska	6–7, 6–0, 6–4
Runner-up	2.	8 February 1999	Birmingham, Great Britain	Hard (i)	(Romania) Magda Mihalache	(Netherlands) Kim de Weille (South Africa) Surina De Beer	6–4, 6–1
Runner-up	3.	1 March 1999	Büchen, Germany	Carpet	(Germany) Lisa Fritz	(Hungary) Adrienn Hegedűs (Poland) Anna Bieleń-Żarska	6–4, 6–2
Runner-up	4.	6 March 2000	Urtijëi, Italy	Hard (i)	(Denmark) Eva Dyrberg	(Italy) Giulia Casoni (Italy) Antonella Serra Zanetti	3–6, 6–4, 6–2
Runner-up	5.	3 April 2000	Dubai, United Arab Emirates	Hard	(Slovenia) Tina Križan	(Italy) Tathiana Garbin (Hungary) Katalin Marosi	7–6, 6–3
Winner	6.	10 April 2000	Cagnes-sur-Mer, France	Hard (i)	(Italy) Giulia Casoni	(Uzbekistan) Iroda Tulyaganova (Ukraine) Anna Zaporozhanova	7–5, 6–1
Runner-up	7.	17 July 2000	Puchheim, Germany	Clay	(Austria) Melanie Schnell	(Bulgaria) Svetlana Krivencheva (Slovakia) Zuzana Váleková	7–5, 3–6, 7–5
Winner	8.	5 March 2001	Urtijëi, Italy	Hard (i)	(Denmark) Eva Dyrberg	(Russia) Ekaterina Kozhokina (Republic of Ireland) Kelly Liggan	3–6, 6–4, 6–2
Runner-up	9.	23 April 2001	Seoul, South Korea	Hard	(Hungary) Adrienn Hegedűs	(South Korea) Kim Eun-ha (Indonesia) Wynne Prakusya	3–6, 2–6
Runner-up	10.	14 October 2001	Cardiff, United Kingdom	Hard (i)	(Germany) Vanessa Henke	(Russia) Natalia Egorova (Russia) Ekaterina Sysoeva	4–6, 6–1, 2–6
Runner-up	11.	3 February 2002	Urtijëi, Italy	Carpet	(Austria) Patricia Wartusch	(Ukraine) Yuliya Beygelzimer (Australia) Anastasia Rodionova	6–4, 6–2
Winner	12.	14 July 2003	Garching bei München, Germany	Clay	(Czech Republic) Lenka Němečková	(Germany) Antonia Matic (Germany) Lydia Steinbach	6–2, 7–6^{(9–7)}
Winner	13.	4 Aug 2003	Hechingen, Germany	Clay	(Germany) Jasmin Wöhr	(Austria) Daniela Klemenschits (Austria) Sandra Klemenschits	6–1, 6–4
Runner-up	14.	12 July 2004	Garching bei München, Germany	Clay	(Slovakia) Stanislava Hrozenská	(Argentina) Erica Krauth (France) Aurélie Védy	4–6, 6–7^{(5–7)}
Runner-up	15.	14 March 2006	Fuerteventura, Spain	Clay	(Germany) Kristina Barrois	(Ukraine) Yuliya Beygelzimer (Germany) Angelika Rösch	6–3, 6–7^{(5–7)}, 6–4
Winner	16.	7 November 2006	Toronto, Ontario, Canada	Hard (i)	(Czech Republic) Hana Šromová	(Canada) Heidi El Tabakh (Romania) Raluca Olaru	6–4, 6–1
Winner	17.	14 January 2007	Tampa, United States	Hard	(United States) Tetiana Luzhanska	(Czech Republic) Andrea Hlaváčková (Czech Republic) Olga Blahotová	7–5, 6–2
Winner	18.	21 January 2007	Fort Walton Beach, United States	Hard	(United States) Tetiana Luzhanska	(Canada) Marie-Ève Pelletier (United States) Sunitha Rao	7–5, 6–7^{(7–9)}, 7–6^{(7–4)}
Runner-up	19.	22 April 2007	Dothan, United States	Clay	(Germany) Vanessa Henke	(Chinese Taipei) Yung-Jan Chan (Chinese Taipei) Chia-Jung Chuang	2–6, 3–6
Runner-up	20.	28 January 2008	La Quinta, United States	Hard	(United States) Tetiana Luzhanska	(United States) Carly Gullickson (United States) Shenay Perry	1–6, 4–6
