= Elena Bovina =

Russian tennis player (born 1983)

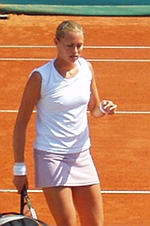
- Bovina in 2002
- Native name: Елена Бовина
- Country (sports): Russia
- Residence: Quebec City, Canada
- Born: 10 March 1983 (age 43) Moscow, Soviet Union
- Height: 1.89 m (6 ft 2 1/2 in)
- Turned pro: 1998
- Plays: Right (two-handed backhand)
- Coach: Ini Ghidirmic
- Prize money: $1,997,443

Singles
- Career record: 426–255
- Career titles: 3 WTA, 8 ITF
- Highest ranking: No. 14 (4 April 2005)

Grand Slam singles results
- Australian Open: 4R (2003)
- French Open: 4R (2005)
- Wimbledon: 2R (2001, 2002, 2003, 2004)
- US Open: QF (2002)

Doubles
- Career record: 171–108
- Career titles: 5 WTA, 11 ITF
- Highest ranking: No. 14 (3 February 2003)

Grand Slam doubles results
- Australian Open: 3R (2003)
- French Open: QF (2003)
- Wimbledon: 1R (2002)
- US Open: QF (2003)

Elena Olegovna Bovina (Russian: Елена Олеговна Бовина, IPA: [ɪ̯ɪˈlʲenə ˈbovʲɪnə]; born 10 March 1983) is a former professional tennis player from Russia. She reached a career-high singles ranking of world No. 14 in April 2005. Her best performance at a Grand Slam tournament came when she got to the quarterfinals of the 2002 US Open, defeating Clarisa Fernández, Jelena Dokic, Stéphanie Foretz, and Francesca Schiavone, before losing to Lindsay Davenport.

In June 2005, Bovina sustained a right shoulder injury, which forced her to withdraw from all tournaments through the end of the year. She pulled out of all events she had entered in early 2006, and for some time, she was unranked in both singles and doubles. She returned to the WTA Tour at the Kremlin Cup in October 2006.

She won three career singles titles, including the Tier II Pilot Pen Tennis Open. She was a finalist in three singles tournaments, and won five career doubles titles, including the Pan Pacific Open (with Rennae Stubbs), and the Swisscom Challenge in Zurich with Justine Henin-Hardenne. In addition, she won the 2004 Australian Open mixed doubles title with Nenad Zimonjić, and was the runner-up in the 2002 French Open mixed doubles tournament. She also was on the victorious 2005 Russian Fed Cup squad and was also on the team from 2001 to 2003.

In 2017, Bovina returned to tennis after a four-year hiatus. She competed in some ITF events during 2017 and the following year.

== Grand Slam tournament finals ==
=== Mixed doubles: 2 (1 title, 1 runner-up) ===
Result	Year	Championship	Surface	Partner	Opponents	Score
Loss	2002	French Open	Clay	(The Bahamas) Mark Knowles	(Zimbabwe) Cara Black; (Zimbabwe) Wayne Black	3–6, 3–6
Win	2004	Australian Open	Hard	(Serbia and Montenegro) Nenad Zimonjić	(India) Leander Paes; (United States) Martina Navratilova	6–1, 7–6^{(7–3)}

== WTA Tour finals ==
=== Singles: 6 (3 titles, 3 runner-ups) ===
Legend
Tier II (1–1)
Tier III, IV & V (2–2)

Result	Date	Tournament	Surface	Opponent	Score
Loss	Apr 2001	Estoril Open, Portugal	Clay	(Spain) Ángeles Montolio	6–3, 3–6, 2–6
Win	May 2002	Warsaw Open, Poland	Clay	(Slovakia) Henrieta Nagyová	6–3, 6–1
Win	Sep 2002	Bell Challenge, Canada	Carpet (i)	(Switzerland) Marie-Gayanay Mikaelian	6–3, 6–4
Win	Aug 2004	New Haven Open, United States	Hard	(France) Nathalie Dechy	6–2, 2–6, 7–5
Loss	Oct 2004	Gaz de France Stars, Belgium	Carpet (i)	(Russia) Elena Dementieva	0–6, 6–0, 4–6
Loss	Oct 2004	Linz Open, Austria	Hard (i)	(France) Amélie Mauresmo	2–6, 0–6

=== Doubles: 8 (5 titles, 3 runner-ups) ===
Legend
Tier I (2–0)
Tier II (0–1)
Tier III, IV & V (3–2)

Result	Date	Tournament	Surface	Partner	Opponents	Score
Win	Oct 2001	Bratislava Open, Slovakia	Hard (i)	(Czech Republic) Dája Bedáňová	(France) Nathalie Dechy (United States) Meilen Tu	6–3, 6–4
Win	Oct 2001	Luxembourg Open	Hard (i)	(Slovakia) Daniela Hantuchová	(Germany) Bianka Lamade (Switzerland) Patty Schnyder	6–3, 6–3
Win	Apr 2002	Estoril Open, Portugal	Clay	(Hungary) Zsófia Gubacsi	(Germany) Barbara Rittner (Colombia) María Vento-Kabchi	6–3, 6–1
Loss	Apr 2002	Budapest Grand Prix, Hungary	Clay	(Hungary) Zsófia Gubacsi	(Australia) Catherine Barclay (France) Émilie Loit	6–4, 3–6, 3–6
Loss	May 2002	Bol Open, Croatia	Clay	(Slovakia) Henrieta Nagyová	(Italy) Tathiana Garbin (Indonesia) Angelique Widjaja	5–7, 6–3, 4–6
Win	Oct 2002	Zurich Open, Switzerland	Carpet (i)	(Belgium) Justine Henin	(Federal Republic of Yugoslavia) Jelena Dokic (Russia) Nadia Petrova	6–2, 7–6^{(7–2)}
Wi	Feb 2003	Pan Pacific Open, Japan	Carpet (i)	(Australia) Rennae Stubbs	(United States) Lisa Raymond (United States) Lindsay Davenport	6–3, 6–4
Loss	Aug 2003	LA Championships, US	Hard	(Belgium) Els Callens	(France) Mary Pierce (Australia) Rennae Stubbs	3–6, 3–6

== ITF finals ==
=== Singles: 11 (8–3) ===
Legend $100,000 tournaments $50,000 tournaments $25,000 tournaments $10,000 tournaments	Finals by surface Hard (7–2) Clay (0–1) Carpet (1–0)

Result	No.	Date	Tournament	Surface	Opponent	Score
Win	1.	31 May 1998	ITF El Paso, United States	Hard	(United States) Diana Ospina	3–6, 7–6, 7–6
Win	2.	6 February 2000	ITF Jersey, United Kingdom	Hard (i)	(United Kingdom) Helen Reesby	6–2, 6–3
Win	3.	13 February 2000	Birmingham, UK	Hard (i)	(Ukraine) Anna Zaporozhanova	6–1, 6–2
Win	4.	20 February 2000	Redbridge, UK	Hard (i)	(United Kingdom) Julie Pullin	2–6, 6–0, 6–1
Loss	1.	5 March 2000	Chengdu, China	Hard	(China) Yi Jingqian	1–6, 2–6
Win	5.	17 August 2008	Bronx Open, US	Hard	(Germany) Anna-Lena Grönefeld	6–3, 7–5
Win	6.	16 March 2009	Tenerife, Spain	Hard	(Canada) Rebecca Marino	6–2, 6–4
Win	7.	7 February 2010	Belfort, France	Carpet (i)	(Switzerland) Romina Oprandi	7–6^{(3)}, 5–7, 6–4
Win	8.	9 August 2010	Tallinn, Estonia	Hard	(United Kingdom) Anne Keothavong	6–4, 4–1 ret.
Loss	2.	19 February 2012	Portimão, Portugal	Hard	(Germany) Justine Ozga	6–4, 1–6, 1–6
Loss	3.	8 April 2012	ITF Jackson, US	Clay	(Canada) Heidi El Tabakh	0–6, 4–6

=== Doubles: 17 (11–6) ===
Outcome	No.	Date	Tournament	Surface	Partner	Opponents	Score
Winner	1.	6 February 2000	ITF Jersey, United Kingdom	Hard (i)	(Ukraine) Anna Zaporozhanova	(Tunisia) Selima Sfar (United Kingdom) Jo Ward	6–3, 6–2
Winner	2.	13 February 2000	Birmingham, UK	Hard (i)	(Ukraine) Anna Zaporozhanova	(Russia) Natalia Egorova (Russia) Ekaterina Sysoeva	6–3, 6–4
Runner-up	3.	4 September 2000	Denain, France	Clay	(Argentina) Mariana Díaz Oliva	(Spain) Lourdes Domínguez Lino (Spain) María José Martínez Sánchez	4–6, 0–6
Winner	4.	6 June 2009	Galatina, Italy	Clay	(Russia) Regina Kulikova	(Spain) Beatriz Garcia-Vidagany; (Argentina) María Emilia Salerni	6–2, 6–1
Runner-up	5.	12 June 2009	Open de Marseille, France	Clay	(Switzerland) Timea Bacsinszky	(Italy) Tathiana Garbin (Argentina) María Emilia Salerni	7–6^{(4)}, 3–6, [7–10]
Winner	6.	7 February 2010	Belfort, France	Carpet (i)	(France) Irena Pavlovic	(Austria) Nikola Hofmanova (Russia) Karina Pimkina	6–2, 2–6, [10–6]
Winner	7.	6 March 2010	Minsk, Belarus	Hard (i)	(France) Irena Pavlovic	(Estonia) Maret Ani (Russia) Vitalia Diatchenko	6–0, 6–1
Winner	8.	8 November 2010	Minsk, Belarus	Hard (i)	(Russia) Ekaterina Bychkova	(Poland) Paula Kania (Poland) Katarzyna Piter	6–4, 6–0
Winner	9.	3 April 2011	Monzón, Spain	Hard	(Russia) Valeria Savinykh	(Georgia (country)) Margalita Chakhnashvili (Croatia) Ivana Lisjak	6–1, 2–6, [10–4]
Winner	10.	16 October 2011	Troy, United States	Hard	(Russia) Valeria Savinykh	(United States) Varvara Lepchenko (United States) Mashona Washington	7–6^{(6)}, 6–3
Runner-up	11.	6 March 2012	Fort Walton Beach, US	Hard	(France) Alizé Lim	(United States) Madison Brengle (Poland) Paula Kania	3–6, 4–6
Winner	12.	8 April 2012	Jackson, US	Clay	(Croatia) Tereza Mrdeža	(Argentina) Mailen Auroux (Argentina) María Irigoyen	6–3, 6–3
Runner-up	13.	14 April 2012	Pelham, US	Clay	(Russia) Ekaterina Bychkova	(France) Julie Coin (Canada) Marie-Ève Pelletier	5–7, 4–6
Runner-up	14.	29 April 2012	Charlottesville Open, US	Clay	(Israel) Julia Glushko	(United States) Maria Sanchez (United States) Yasmin Schnack	2–6, 2–6
Winner	15.	18 June 2012	ITF Kristinehamn, Sweden	Clay	(Russia) Valeria Solovyeva	(Belarus) Viktoryia Kisialeva (Belarus) Ilona Kremen	6–2, 6–2
Runner-up	16.	30 September 2012	Las Vegas Open, United States	Hard	(Romania) Edina Gallovits-Hall	(Australia) Anastasia Rodionova (Australia) Arina Rodionova	2–6, 6–2, [6–10]
Winner	17.	18 June 2012	ITF New Braunfels, US	Hard	(Croatia) Mirjana Lučić-Baroni	(Colombia) Mariana Duque Mariño (Venezuela) Adriana Pérez	6–3, 4–6, [10–8]

== Grand Slam performance timelines ==
Key
W	F	SF	QF	#R	RR	Q#	DNQ	A	NH

(W) winner; (F) finalist; (SF) semifinalist; (QF) quarterfinalist; (#R) rounds 4, 3, 2, 1; (RR) round-robin stage; (Q#) qualification round; (DNQ) did not qualify; (A) absent; (NH) not held; (SR) strike rate (events won / competed); (W–L) win–loss record.

=== Singles ===
Tournament	1998	1999	2000	2001	2002	2003	2004	2005	2006	2007	2008	2009	2010	2011	2012	Career W-L
Grand Slam tournaments
Australian Open	A	A	A	1R	1R	4R	2R	A	A	1R	A	Q1	Q2	Q1	A	4–5
French Open	A	A	1R	3R	1R	2R	3R	4R	A	A	A	Q1	Q2	A	A	8–6
Wimbledon	A	A	Q1	2R	2R	2R	2R	A	A	A	A	A	Q2	A	A	4–4
US Open	A	A	Q2	1R	QF	1R	3R	A	A	A	Q2	Q1	Q2	A	A	6–4
GS Win–loss	0–1	3–4	5–4	5–4	6–4	3–1	N/A	0–1	N/A	N/A	N/A	N/A	N/A	N/A	N/A	22–19
Year-end ranking	382	398	135	49	26	21	15	62	—	324	186	225	154	301	214	

=== Doubles ===
Tournament	2000	2001	2002	2003	2004	2005	2007	2009	2010	2011	2012	Career
Grand Slam tournaments
Australian Open	A	A	1R	3R	A	A	2R	A	A	A	A	0 / 3
French Open	A	A	3R	QF	A	2R	A	A	A	A	A	0 / 3
Wimbledon	Q1	A	1R	A	A	A	A	A	A	A	A	0 / 1
US Open	A	1R	1R	QF	A	A	A	A	A	A	A	0 / 3
Premier Mandatory tournaments
Indian Wells	A	A	QF	QF	A	2R	A	A	A	A	A	0 / 3
Miami	A	A	2R	1R	A	QF	A	A	A	A	A	0 / 3
Premier 5 tournaments
Rome	A	A	A	A	QF	A	A	A	A	A	A	0 / 1
Montréal / Toronto	A	1R	1R	A	A	A	A	A	A	A	A	0 / 2
Tokyo	A	A	A	W	A	A	A	A	A	A	A	1 / 1
Former Tier I tournaments
Charleston	A	A	A	QF	A	A	A	A	A	A	A	0 / 1
Berlin	A	A	A	A	1R	2R	A	not held				0 / 2
Zurich	A	A	W	A	A	A	A	not held				1 / 1
Moscow	1R	A	SF	A	SF	A	A	A	A	A	A	0 / 3
Finals	0	0	2	1	0	0	0	0	0	0	0	3
Titles	0	2	2	1	0	0	0	0	0	0	0	5
Overall win–loss	14–6	11–10	23–18	21–9	9–7	5–4	2–2	9–3	20–10	21–14	15–11	134–83
Year-end ranking	377	88	27	22	68	142	278	255	185	105	116	N/A

=== Mixed doubles ===
Tournament	2002	2003	2004	2005	2006	2007	Career W-L
Australian Open	A	A	W	A	A	1R	5–1
French Open	F	A	SF	A	A	A	7–2
Wimbledon	1R	QF	A	A	A	A	2–2
US Open	QF	A	A	A	A	A	2–1
