= 1999 Kremlin Cup =

- Date: 8–14 November (men); 18–24 October (women)
- Edition: 10th (men) / 4th (women)
- Surface: Carpet / indoor
- Location: Moscow, Russia
- Venue: Olympic Stadium

Champions

Men's singles
- (Russia) Yevgeny Kafelnikov

Women's singles
- (France) Nathalie Tauziat

Men's doubles
- (United States) Justin Gimelstob / (Czech Republic) Daniel Vacek

Women's doubles
- (United States) Lisa Raymond / (Australia) Rennae Stubbs
- Kremlin Cup

The 1999 Kremlin Cup was a tennis tournament played on indoor carpet courts at the Olympic Stadium in Moscow in Russia that was part of the International Series of the 1999 ATP Tour and of Tier I of the 1999 WTA Tour. The men's tournament was held from 8 November through 14 November 1999, while the women's tournament was held from 18 October through 24 October 1999. Yevgeny Kafelnikov and Nathalie Tauziat won the singles titles.

== Finals ==
=== Men's singles ===
(Russia) Yevgeny Kafelnikov defeated (Zimbabwe) Byron Black 7–6^{(7–2)}, 6–4

- It was Kafelnikov's 3rd title of the year and the 20th of his career.

=== Women's singles ===
(France) Nathalie Tauziat defeated (Austria) Barbara Schett 2–6, 6–4, 6–1

- It was Tauziat's 1st title of the year and the 5th of her career.

=== Men's doubles ===
(United States) Justin Gimelstob / (Czech Republic) Daniel Vacek defeated (Ukraine) Andriy Medvedev / (Russia) Marat Safin 6–2, 6–1

- It was Gimelstob's 5th title of the year and the 7th of his career. It was Vacek's 4th title of the year and the 24th of his career.

=== Women's doubles ===
(United States) Lisa Raymond / (Australia) Rennae Stubbs defeated (France) Julie Halard-Decugis / (Germany) Anke Huber 6–1, 6–0

- It was Raymond's 4th title of the year and the 13th of her career. It was Stubbs's 4th title of the year and the 18th of her career.

== WTA entrants ==
=== Seeds ===
Country	Player	Rank	Seed
FRA	Mary Pierce	6	1
AUT	Barbara Schett	8	2
FRA	Julie Halard-Decugis	9	3
FRA	Nathalie Tauziat	10	4
BEL	Dominique Van Roost	12	5
ESP	Conchita Martínez	13	6
FRA	Sandrine Testud	14	7
RUS	Elena Likhovtseva	16	8

=== Other entrants ===
The following players received wildcards into the singles main draw:

- (Russia) Tatiana Panova
- (Russia) Lina Krasnoroutskaya

The following players received wildcards into the doubles main draw:

- (Russia) Lina Krasnoroutskaya / (Russia) Elena Makarova

The following players received entry from the qualifying draw:

- (Ukraine) Elena Tatarkova
- (Russia) Nadia Petrova
- (Russia) Elena Dementieva
- (Russia) Anastasia Myskina
- (France) Sarah Pitkowski / (Russia) Ekaterina Sysoeva

The following player received entry as a lucky loser:

- (United States) Kimberly Po
