= 1999 Kremlin Cup – Men's singles =

Men's singles
- 1999 Kremlin Cup

Final
- Champion: (Russia) Yevgeny Kafelnikov
- Runner-up: (Zimbabwe) Byron Black
- Score: 7–6^{(7–2)}, 6–4

Details
- Draw: 32 (4 Q / 3 WC )
- Seeds: 8

Events
Singles	men	women
Doubles	men	women
← 1998 ·	Kremlin Cup	· 2000 →

Yevgeny Kafelnikov was the defending champion and won in the final 7–6^{(7–2)}, 6–4 against Byron Black.

== Seeds ==
1. (Russia) Yevgeny Kafelnikov (champions)
2. (United States) Vince Spadea (first round)
3. (France) Sébastien Grosjean (first round)
4. (Morocco) Younes El Aynaoui (first round)
5. (Ukraine) Andriy Medvedev (quarterfinals)
6. (Russia) Marat Safin (first round)
7. (Switzerland) Marc Rosset (quarterfinals)
8. (Czech Republic) Jiří Novák (first round)

== Draw ==
=== Key ===
- Q = Qualifier
- WC = Wild card
- LL = Lucky loser
- Alt = Alternate
- SE = Special exempt
- PR = Protected ranking
- ITF = ITF entry
- JE = Junior exempt
- w/o = Walkover
- r = Retired
- d = Defaulted
- SR = Special ranking

=== Finals ===
Semifinals
1	(Russia) Yevgeny Kafelnikov	6^{4}	7^{7}	6
(France) Nicolas Escudé	7^{7}	6^{2}	4
(Zimbabwe) Byron Black	6	6
(United States) Jeff Tarango	3	2

Final
1	(Russia) Yevgeny Kafelnikov	7^{7}	6
(Zimbabwe) Byron Black	6^{2}	4

=== Top half ===
First round
1	(Russia) Y Kafelnikov	6	6
(France) A Clément	3	2
(Germany) D Prinosil	6	6
(Australia) A Ilie	3	2
(Czech Republic) D Vacek	6	6
WC	(Russia) M Youzhny	1	4
Q	(France) C Saulnier	2	7^{7}	6
8	(Czech Republic) J Novák	6	6^{3}	4
4	(Morocco) Y El Aynaoui	6^{3}	6^{5}
(France) N Escudé	7^{7}	7^{7}
(Slovakia) J Krošlák	5	7^{7}	7^{7}
(Netherlands) J Siemerink	7	6^{3}	6^{3}
(Argentina) G Cañas	3	7	6^{6}
Q	(Russia) A Stoliarov	6	5	7^{8}
Q	(Belarus) M Mirnyi	2	4
5	(Ukraine) A Medvedev	6	6

Second round
1	(Russia) Y Kafelnikov	6	7
(Germany) D Prinosil	4	5
(Czech Republic) D Vacek	6^{9}	6	7
Q	(France) C Saulnier	7^{11}	3	5
(France) N Escudé	6	3	6
(Slovakia) J Krošlák	1	6	3
Q	(Russia) A Stoliarov	6	4	1
5	(Ukraine) A Medvedev	4	6	6

Quarterfinals
1	(Russia) Y Kafelnikov	7^{7}	6
(Czech Republic) D Vacek	6^{3}	3
(France) N Escudé	2	6	6
5	(Ukraine) A Medvedev	6	3	2

Semifinals
1	(Russia) Y Kafelnikov	6^{4}	7^{7}	6
(France) N Escudé	7^{7}	6^{2}	3

=== Bottom half ===
First round
6	(Russia) M Safin	6^{3}	5
(France) F Santoro	7^{7}	7
(United States) J Gimelstob	6	6
WC	(Russia) A Cherkasov	3	3
(Morocco) H Arazi	1	5
(Zimbabwe) B Black	6	7
(Croatia) G Ivanišević	6	7
3	(France) S Grosjean	4	5
7	(Switzerland) M Rosset	3	6	6
(Uzbekistan) O Ogorodov	6	1	3
Q	(Russia) A Derepasko	4	1
(Armenia) S Sargsian	6	6
(Romania) A Pavel	6	6
WC	(Russia) I Kunitsyn	2	2
(United States) J Tarango	7^{7}	6
2	(United States) V Spadea	6^{5}	2

Second round
(France) F Santoro	5	6	7^{8}
(United States) J Gimelstob	7	1	6^{6}
(Zimbabwe) B Black	7^{7}	3
(Croatia) G Ivanišević	6^{4}	1^{r}
7	(Switzerland) M Rosset	6	6
(Armenia) S Sargsian	3	4
(Romania) A Pavel	3	5
(United States) J Tarango	6	7

Quarterfinals
(France) F Santoro	3	4
(Zimbabwe) B Black	6	6
7	(Switzerland) M Rosset	7	6^{4}	4
(United States) J Tarango	5	7^{7}	6

Semifinals
(Zimbabwe) B Black	6	6
(United States) J Tarango	3	2
