= Tatiana Perebiynis =

Ukrainian tennis player

Tatiana Perebiynis Тетяна Перебийніс
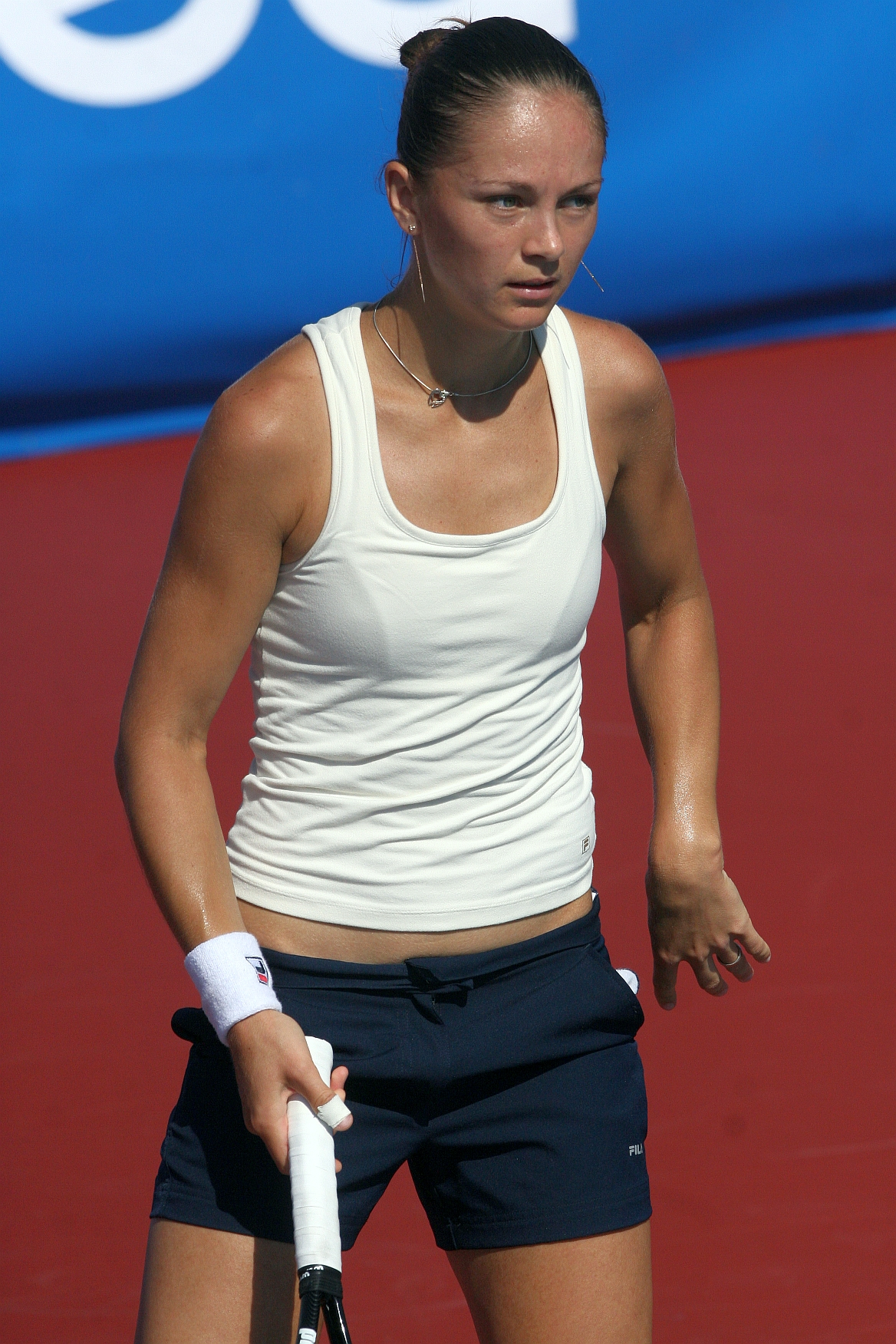
- Perebiynis at the 2008 Nordea Nordic Light Open
- Country (sports): Ukraine
- Born: 15 December 1982 (age 43) Kharkiv, Ukrainian SSR, Soviet Union
- Height: 1.73 m (5 ft 8 in)
- Turned pro: 1996
- Retired: 2010
- Plays: Right-handed (double-handed backhand)
- Prize money: $1,148,734

Singles
- Career record: 247–190
- Career titles: 0 WTA, 4 ITF
- Highest ranking: No. 55 (21 April 2008)

Grand Slam singles results
- Australian Open: 2R (2005, 2008)
- French Open: 3R (2004)
- Wimbledon: 3R (2004)
- US Open: 3R (2008)

Doubles
- Career record: 154–141
- Career titles: 6 WTA, 4 ITF
- Highest ranking: No. 35 (21 April 2008)

Grand Slam doubles results
- Australian Open: 3R (2008)
- French Open: 3R (2007)
- Wimbledon: SF (2006)
- US Open: 2R (2001, 2003, 2007)

Grand Slam mixed doubles results
- Wimbledon: F (2005)

Tatiana Yuryevna Perebiynis (Ukrainian: Тетяна Юріївна Перебийніс, romanized: Tetyana Yuriyivna Perebyinis; born 15 December 1982) is a former professional tennis player from Ukraine.

She reached the Wimbledon junior girls' singles final in 2000, and won the Wimbledon juniors doubles final that same year.

In 2008, she reached her career-high ranking of world No. 55.

== Biography ==
Tatiana Perebiynis was coached by her husband, Dimitriy "Dima" Zadorozhniy. They married on 15 October 2005 in Kharkiv. Her father, Yuriy Perebiynis, is retired and her mother, Alla Lihova, is an economist at a bank.

== Tennis career ==
She lists winning the Wimbledon junior doubles in 2000 and reaching the final in singles that same year as memorable experiences.

Although Perebiynis has not won a WTA Tour singles title but she has a runner-up in single when she lost to Australian Alicia Molik in Stockholm in 2004. She did, however, win six WTA tournaments in doubles. Her most notable doubles titles are her two victories at the J&S Cup in Warsaw, partnering with Barbora Strýcová (2005) and Vera Dushevina (2007).

Her best performance at a Grand Slam tournament came at Wimbledon in 2005, when she partnered with Australia's Paul Hanley in mixed doubles. The pair reached the final, losing in straight sets to Mahesh Bhupathi and Mary Pierce.

The following year, she partnered with fellow Ukrainian Yuliana Fedak for the qualifying event of women's doubles at Wimbledon. The pair qualified for the event, then reached the semi-finals where they lost to Paola Suárez and Virginia Ruano Pascual.

While Perebiynis was a talented junior and a respected doubles player, she has had less success in singles on the main tour. Though she swiftly climbed up the ranks early in her career, reaching the third round at both Roland Garros and Wimbledon in 2004, her tennis career faltered when she was diagnosed with a viral infection in mid-2005. She was forced out of competition for over six months and, as a result, her ranking dropped to outside of the top 200. In October 2007, Perebiynis re-entered the top 100 after qualifying for the Kremlin Cup, jumping over 30 places to 97 in the rankings.

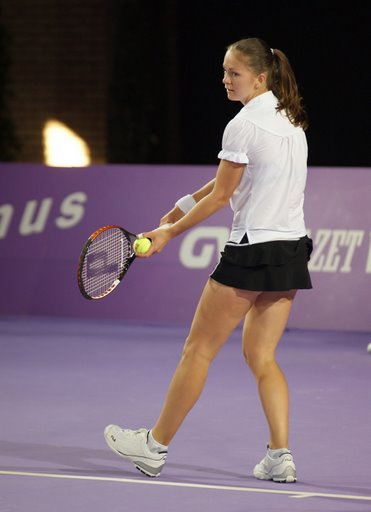
Tatiana Perebiynis in Antwerpen 2008

== Grand Slam finals ==
=== Mixed doubles: 1 (0–1) ===
Result	Year	Championship	Surface!	Partner	Opponents	Score
Loss	2005	Wimbledon	Grass	(Australia) Paul Hanley	(France) Mary Pierce (India) Mahesh Bhupathi	4–6, 2–6

== WTA career finals ==
=== Singles: 1 (0–1) ===
Legend (before 2009)
WTA Championships (0/0)
Tier I (0/0)
Tier II (0/0)
Tier III (0/0)
Tier IV & V (0/1)

Result	No.	Date	Tournament	Surface	Opponent	Score
Loss	0–1	Aug 2004	Stockholm, Sweden	Hard	(Australia) Alicia Molik	1–6, 1–6

=== Doubles: 11 (6–5) ===
Legend (before 2009)
WTA Championships (0)
Tier I (0)
Tier II (2/1)
Tier III (3/1)
Tier IV & V (1/3)

Result	No.	Date	Tournament	Surface	Partnering	Opponents	Score
Loss	0–1	Jun 2001	Tashkent, Uzbekistan	Hard	(Belarus) Tatiana Poutchek	(Hungary) Petra Mandula (Austria) Patricia Wartusch	1–6, 4–6
Win	1–1	Jun 2002	Tashkent, Uzbekistan	Hard	(Belarus) Tatiana Poutchek	(Germany) Mia Buric (Russia) Galina Fokina	7–5, 6–2
Loss	1–2	Feb 2003	Bogotá, Colombia	Clay	(Slovenia) Tina Križan	(Slovenia) Katarina Srebotnik (Sweden) Åsa Svensson	2–6, 1–6
Loss	1–3	Apr 2003	Budapest, Hungary	Clay	(Spain) Conchita Martínez Granados	(Hungary) Petra Mandula (Ukraine) Elena Tatarkova	3–6, 1–6
Win	2–3	Jul 2003	Sopot, Poland	Clay	(Croatia) Silvija Talaja	(Estonia) Maret Ani (Czech Republic) Libuše Průšová	6–4, 6–2
Loss	2–4	Aug 2003	Helsinki, Finland	Clay	(Croatia) Silvija Talaja	(Russia) Evgenia Kulikovskaya (Ukraine) Elena Tatarkova	2–6, 4–6
Win	3–4	Feb 2005	Acapulco, Mexico	Clay	(Russia) Alina Jidkova	(Spain) Rosa María Andrés Rodríguez (Spain) Conchita Martínez Granados	7–5, 6–3
Win	4–4	May 2005	Warsaw, Poland	Clay	(Czech Republic) Barbora Strýcová	(Poland) Klaudia Jans (Poland) Alicja Rosolska	6–1, 6–4
Win	5–4	Apr 2007	Warsaw, Poland	Clay	(Russia) Vera Dushevina	(Russia) Elena Likhovtseva (Russia) Elena Vesnina	7–5, 3–6, [10–2]
Loss	5–5	Jan 2008	Sydney, Australia	Hard	(Belarus) Tatiana Poutchek	(China) Yan Zi (China) Zheng Jie	4–6, 6–7^{(5)}
Win	6–5	May 2008	Strasbourg, France	Clay	(China) Yan Zi	(Chinese Taipei) Chan Yung-jan (Chinese Taipei) Chuang Chia-jung	6–4, 6–7^{(3)}, [10–6]

== ITF finals ==
=== Singles: 9 (4–5) ===
Result	No.	Date	Tournament	Surface	Category	Opponent	Score
Loss	1.	1998	Ashkelon, Israel	Hard	$10K	(Netherlands) Kim Kilsdonk	1–6, 6–3, 3–6
Loss	2.	1999	Istanbul, Turkey	Hard	$10K	(Belarus) Nadejda Ostrovskaya	2–6, 2–6
Loss	3.	1999	Ashkelon, Israel	Hard	$25K	(Denmark) Eva Dyrberg	4–6, 4–6
Win	1.	1999	Kharkiv, Ukraine	Clay	$25K	(Ukraine) Anna Zaporozhanova	6–3, 6–3
Win	2.	2000	Istanbul, Turkey	Hard	$50K	(Switzerland) Miroslava Vavrinec	6–4, 6–3
Loss	4.	2001	Mount Gambier, Australia	Hard	$25K	(Australia) Cindy Watson	3–6, 4–6
Win	3.	2003	Saint-Gaudens, France	Clay	$75K	(Czech Republic) Renata Voráčová	6–4, 6–1
Loss	5.	2006	Hammond, United States	Hard	$50K	(United States) Ansley Cargill	4–6, 4–6
Win	4.	2007	Saint-Gaudens, France	Clay	$50K	(Czech Republic) Petra Cetkovská	5–7, 7–5, 7–5

=== Doubles: 7 (4–3) ===
Result	No.	Date	Tournament	Surface	Category	Partnering	Opponent	Score
Win	1.	1999	Istanbul, Turkey	Hard (i)	$10K	(Uzbekistan) Iroda Tulyaganova	(Belarus) Nadejda Ostrovskaya (Switzerland) Aliénor Tricerri	6–3, 6–4
Win	2.	1999	Kharkiv, Ukraine	Clay	$25K	(Belarus) Nadejda Ostrovskaya	(Russia) Ekaterina Sysoeva (Slovakia) Zuzana Váleková	5–7, 6–3, 6–3
Win	3.	2000	Batumi, Georgia	Clay	$75K	(Belarus) Tatiana Poutchek	(Argentina) Mariana Díaz Oliva (Denmark) Eva Dyrberg	1–4, 4–2, 4–1, 4–2
Loss	1.	2002	Albuquerque, United States	Hard	$75K	(Australia) Christina Wheeler	(Italy) Francesca Lubiani (Venezuela) Milagros Sequera	6–1, 5–7, 5–7
Win	4.	2003	Saint-Gaudens, France	Clay	$75K	(Russia) Evgenia Koulikovskaya	(Belarus) Tatiana Poutchek (Australia) Anastasia Rodionova	7–6^{(8)}, 6–3
Loss	2.	2006	Las Vegas, United States	Hard	$75K	(Brazil) Maria Fernanda Alves	(Australia) Casey Dellacqua (Australia) Nicole Pratt	w/o
Loss	3.	2006	Civitavecchia, Italy	Clay	$25K	(Czech Republic) Barbora Strýcová	(Czech Republic) Lucie Hradecká (Germany) Martina Müller	7–6^{(9)}, 3–6, 5–7

== Singles performance timeline ==
Key
W	F	SF	QF	#R	RR	Q#	DNQ	A	NH

(W) winner; (F) finalist; (SF) semifinalist; (QF) quarterfinalist; (#R) rounds 4, 3, 2, 1; (RR) round-robin stage; (Q#) qualification round; (DNQ) did not qualify; (A) absent; (NH) not held; (SR) strike rate (events won / competed); (W–L) win–loss record.

Tournament	1999	2000	2001	2002	2003	2004	2005	2006	2007	2008	Career W–L
Grand Slam tournaments
Australian Open	A	A	Q1	Q3	Q1	1R	2R	A	Q2	2R	2–3
French Open	A	A	Q1	Q1	1R	3R	1R	A	Q2	1R	2–4
Wimbledon	A	A	Q2	1R	2R	3R	1R	Q2	2R	2R	5–6
US Open	A	A	1R	Q2	2R	1R	A	Q1	1R	3R	3–5
Grand Slam Win–loss	0–0	0–0	0–1	0–1	2–3	4–4	1–3	0–0	1–2	4–4	12–18
Olympic Games
Summer Olympics	NH	A	Not held			2R	Not held			-	1–1
WTA Tier I tournaments
Doha^{1}	Not Tier I									A	0–0
Indian Wells	A	A	A	Q1	Q1	1R	1R	Q1	A	1R	0–3
Miami	A	A	2R	2R	1R	2R	2R	A	A	2R	5–6
Charleston	A	A	A	A	A	1R	2R	A	A	3R	2–3
Berlin	A	A	A	A	A	1R	A	A	A	A	0–1
Rome	A	A	A	A	A	1R	1R	A	A	A	0–2
Montréal/Toronto	A	A	A	A	A	A	A	A	A	A	0–0
Tokyo	A	A	A	A	A	A	A	A	A	A	0–0
Moscow	Q1	Q1	A	A	1R	Q1	A	A	2R	A	1–2
Former WTA Tier I tournaments
Zurich^{1}	A	A	A	Q1	Q2	A	A	A	A	NT1	0–0
San Diego^{1}	Not Tier I					A	A	A	A	NT1	0–0
Year-end ranking	276	188	148	114	80	90	214	158	97		N/A

^{1}Doha became a Tier I event in 2008. San Diego and Zurich are no longer Tier I events.

== Top 10 wins ==
#	Player	Rank	Event	Surface	Rd	Score	TPR
2008
1.	(Russia) Vera Zvonareva	No. 10	US Open, New York, United States	Hard	2R	6–3, 6–3	No. 76
