= Maria Goloviznina =

Russian tennis player

Maria Goloviznina Мария Головизнина
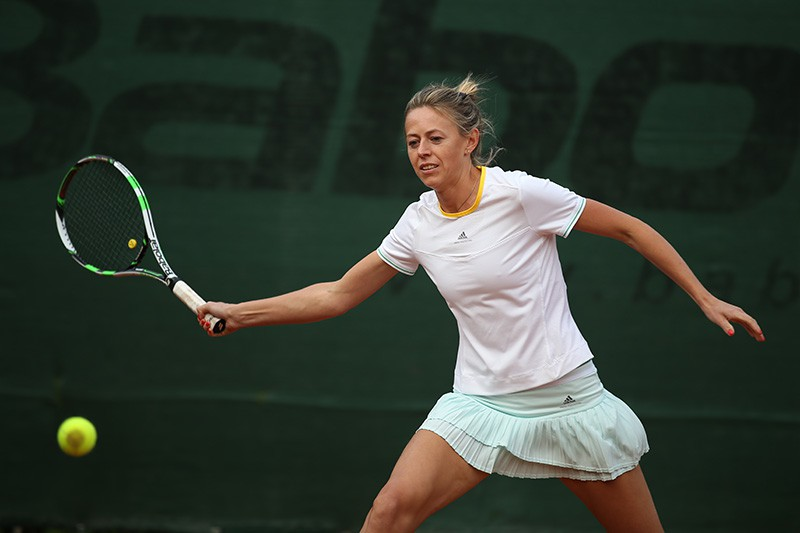
- Country (sports): Russia
- Residence: Moscow, Russia
- Born: 5 June 1979 (age 46); Moscow, Soviet Union
- Height: 1.76 m (5 ft 9 in)
- Turned pro: 1994
- Retired: 2012
- Plays: Right-handed (two-handed backhand)
- Prize money: $133,105

Singles
- Career record: 194–152
- Career titles: 2 ITF
- Highest ranking: No. 135 (31 March 2003)

Grand Slam singles results
- Australian Open: Q2 (2003)
- French Open: 2R (2002)
- Wimbledon: Q1 (2003)
- US Open: Q1 (2002)

Doubles
- Career record: 82–89
- Career titles: 5 ITF
- Highest ranking: No. 139 (3 August 1998)

Maria Goloviznina (Мария Головизнина; born 5 June 1979) is a Russian former tennis player.

She has career-high WTA rankings of 135 in singles, achieved on 31 March 2003, and 139 in doubles, reached on 3 August 1998. She won two singles titles and five doubles titles on the ITF Circuit.

Goloviznina retired from tennis in 2012.

== ITF Circuit finals ==
=== Singles: 8 (2 titles, 6 runner-ups) ===
Legend $50,000 tournaments $25,000 tournaments $10,000 tournaments	Finals by surface Hard (2–1) Clay (0–4) Carpet (0–1)

Result	No.	Date	Tournament	Surface	Opponent	Score
Win	1	30 October 1995	ITF Moscow, Russia	Hard	(Russia) Olga Ivanova	6–2, 2–6, 6–1
Loss	1	26 August 1996	ITF Sochi, Russia	Hard (i)	(Russia) Evgenia Kulikovskaya	1–6, 0–6
Loss	2	16 June 1997	ITF Rome, Italy	Clay	(Japan) Tomoe Hotta	4–6, 4–6
Win	2	19 January 1998	ITF Båstad, Sweden	Hard (i)	(Sweden) Maria Wolfbrandt	6–3, 7–5
Loss	3	18 September 2000	ITF Moscow, Russia	Carpet (i)	(Russia) Vera Zvonareva	4–6, 2–6
Loss	4	25 September 2000	ITF Tbilisi, Georgia	Clay	(Argentina) Mariana Díaz Oliva	6–3, 2–6, 2–6
Loss	5	10 September 2001	ITF Sofia, Bulgaria	Clay	(Czech Republic) Olga Vymetálková	6–7^{(3)}, 4–6
Loss	6	2 September 2002	Open Denain, France	Clay	(Madagascar) Dally Randriantefy	2–6, 6–3, 2–6

=== Doubles: 13 (5 titles, 8 runner-ups) ===
Legend $75,000 tournaments $50,000 tournaments $25,000 tournaments $10,000 tournaments	Finals by surface Hard (3–2) Clay (2–6)

Result	Date	Tier	Tournament	Surface	Partner	Opponents	Score
Loss	23 June 1997	10,000	ITF Milan, Italy	Clay	(Russia) Anna Linkova	(Japan) Tomoe Hotta (Japan) Yoriko Yamagishi	3–6, 7–5, 4–6
Loss	28 July 1997	75,000	ITF Makarska, Croatia	Clay	(Russia) Evgenia Kulikovskaya	(Ukraine) Olga Lugina (Germany) Elena Pampoulova	7–5, 5–7, 5–7
Loss	22 September 1997	50,000	ITF Thessaloniki, Greece	Clay	(Russia) Evgenia Kulikovskaya	(Czech Republic) Radka Bobková (Czech Republic) Jana Pospíšilová	2–6, 3–6
Loss	21 June 1999	25,000	ITF Orbetello, Italy	Clay	(Russia) Anastasia Myskina	(Argentina) Mariana Díaz Oliva (Argentina) Clarisa Fernández	4–6, 2–6
Win	27 September 1999	25,000	ITF Tbilisi, Georgia	Clay	(Russia) Ekaterina Paniouchkina	(Belarus) Nadejda Ostrovskaya (Russia) Ekaterina Sysoeva	6–0, 6–2
Loss	14 August 2000	50,000	ITF İstanbul, Turkey	Hard	(Russia) Evgenia Kulikovskaya	(Romania) Magda Mihalache (Hong Kong) Tong Ka-po	1–6, 2–6
Win	21 May 2001	25,000	ITF Sofia, Bulgaria	Clay	(Russia) Anna Bastrikova	(Slovakia) Lenka Dlhopolcová (Slovakia) Ľubomíra Kurhajcová	6–3, 3–6, 6–2
Win	30 October 2001	25,000	ITF Bolton, Great Britain	Hard (i)	(Morocco) Bahia Mouhtassine	(Serbia and Montenegro) Sandra Načuk (Serbia and Montenegro) Dragana Zarić	6–4, 6–3
Loss	18 February 2002	25,000	ITF Columbus, United States	Hard (i)	(Russia) Evgenia Kulikovskaya	(United States) Teryn Ashley (United States) Kristen Schlukebir	6–4, 4–6, 2–6
Loss	7 July 2003	25,000	ITF Darmstadt, Germany	Clay	(Serbia and Montenegro) Daniela Berček	(Croatia) Sanda Mamić (Croatia) Ana Vrljić	6–7^{(7)}, 1–6
Win	28 March 2004	50,000	ITF St. Petersburg, Russia	Hard (i)	(Russia) Evgenia Kulikovskaya	(Belarus) Darya Kustova (Ukraine) Elena Tatarkova	7–5, 6–1
Loss	12 July 2004	50,000	ITF Vittel, France	Clay	(Sweden) Maria Wolfbrandt	(France) Séverine Beltrame (France) Stéphanie Cohen-Aloro	1–6, 3–6
Win	30 August 2004	25,000	ITF Balashikha, Russia	Hard (i)	(Russia) Elena Vesnina	(Ukraine) Olena Antypina (Russia) Alla Kudryavtseva	7–5, 6–4
