= Ekaterina Sysoeva =

Russian tennis player

- Native name: Екатерина Сысоева
- Country (sports): Russia
- Residence: Moscow, Russia
- Born: 3 June 1981 (age 43); Moscow, Russian SFSR, Soviet Union
- Height: 1.83 m (6 ft 0 in)
- Turned pro: 1994
- Retired: 2006
- Plays: Right-handed (two-handed backhand)
- Prize money: $89,312

Singles
- Career record: 149–87
- Career titles: 0 WTA, 3 ITF
- Highest ranking: No. 178 (12 August 2002)

Grand Slam singles results
- Wimbledon: Q3 (2002)
- US Open: Q1 (2002)

Doubles
- Career record: 118–65
- Career titles: 1 WTA, 10 ITF
- Highest ranking: No. 87 (14 October 2002)

Grand Slam doubles results
- US Open: 3R (2002)

Ekaterina Sysoeva (Russian: Екатерина Сысоева, born 3 June 1981) is a former professional Russian tennis player.

In her career, Sysoeva won one doubles title on the WTA Tour, as well as three singles and ten doubles titles on the ITF Women's Circuit. She reached her career-high singles rank of world No. 178 on 12 August 2002. Her career-high in doubles is 87th, set on 14 October 2002.

Playing for Russia at the Fed Cup, Sysoeva has a win–loss 1–3.

== WTA career finals ==
=== Doubles: 3 (1 titles, 2 runner-ups) ===
Winner – Legend Grand Slam tournaments (0–0) WTA Tour Championships (0–0) Tier I (0–0) Tier II (0–0) Tier III, IV & V (1–2)	Finals by surface Hard (0–0) Grass (0–0) Clay (1–2) Carpet (0–0)

Result	No.	Date	Tournament	Surface	Partner	Opponents	Score
Loss	1	Feb 1998	Bogotá, Colombia	Clay	(United States) Melissa Mazzotta	(Slovakia) Janette Husárová (Argentina) Paola Suárez	6–3, 2–6, 3–6
Win	1	Jul 2002	Palermo, Italy	Clay	(Russia) Evgenia Kulikovskaya	(Bulgaria) Lubomira Bacheva (Germany) Angelika Rösch	6–4, 6–3
Loss	2	Jul 2002	Sopot, Poland	Clay	(Russia) Evgenia Kulikovskaya	(Russia) Svetlana Kuznetsova (Spain) Arantxa Sánchez Vicario	2–6, 2–6

== ITF finals ==
=== Singles (3–9) ===
Legend $100,000 tournaments $75,000 tournaments $50,000 tournaments $25,000 tournaments $10,000 tournaments	Finals by surface Hard (3–2) Clay (0–4) Grass (0–1) Carpet (0–2)

Result	No.	Date	Tournament	Surface	Opponent	Score
Loss	1	17 October 1994	Moscow, Russia	Hard (i)	(Russia) Olga Ivanova	2–6, 5–7
Win	1	2 October 1995	Šiauliai, Lithuania	Hard	(Russia) Nadia Streltsova	4–6, 6–2, 6–2
Loss	2	19 February 1996	Nürnberg, Germany	Carpet (i)	(Czech Republic) Jana Pospíšilová	3–6, 3–6
Loss	3	1 April 1996	Athens, Greece	Clay	(Austria) Ulrike Priller	6–2, 3–6, 2–6
Loss	4	10 February 1997	Rogaška Slatina, Slovakia	Carpet (i)	(Germany) Miriam Schnitzer	6–7^{(3)}, 4–6
Loss	5	17 May 1999	Pesaro, Italy	Clay	(Germany) Susi Lohrmann	4–6, 2–6
Loss	6	16 July 2001	Frinton, England	Grass	(Australia) Kristen van Elden	6–3, 4–6, 5–7
Win	2	8 August 2001	Bath, England	Hard	(Italy) Anna Floris	6–4, 6–0
Win	3	13 August 2001	London, England	Hard	(Russia) Natalia Egorova	6–4, 6–4
Loss	7	29 January 2002	Tipton, England	Hard (i)	(China) Liu Nannan	6–4, 5–7, 4–6
Loss	8	29 April 2002	Maglie, Italy	Clay	(Spain) Conchita Martínez Granados	1–6, 1–6
Loss	9	14 May 2002	Hatfield, England	Clay	(United Kingdom) Jane O'Donoghue	6–7^{(6)}, 1–6

=== Doubles (10–8) ===
Legend $100,000 tournaments $75,000 tournaments $50,000 tournaments $25,000 tournaments $10,000 tournaments	Finals by surface Hard (4–2) Clay (5–6) Grass (0–0) Carpet (1–0)

Result	No.	Date	Tournament	Surface	Partner	Opponents	Score
Win	1	19 May 1997	Sochi, Russia	Hard	(Russia) Evgenia Kulikovskaya	(Georgia (country)) Nino Louarsabishvili (Japan) Kaoru Shibata	3–6, 6–3, 6–0
Win	2	17 August 1998	Carrabba, Italy	Clay	(Japan) Ayami Takase	(Australia) Mireille Dittmann (Australia) Natalie Dittmann	6–2, 6–0
Win	3	5 October 1998	Batumi, Georgia	Hard	(Russia) Evgenia Kulikovskaya	(Netherlands) Amanda Hopmans (Austria) Melanie Schnell	6–4, 3–6, 6–0
Loss	1	17 May 1999	Pesaro, Italy	Clay	(Croatia) Marijana Kovačević	(Serbia and Montenegro) Dragana Ilić (Slovenia) Maja Matevžič	4–6, 3–6
Win	4	21 June 1999	Tallinn, Estonia	Clay	(Russia) Irina Kornienko	(Finland) Minna Rautajoki (Sweden) Maria Wolfbrandt	6–1, 6–1
Loss	2	2 August 1999	Kharkiv, Ukraine	Clay	(Slovakia) Zuzana Váleková	(Belarus) Nadejda Ostrovskaya (Ukraine) Tatiana Perebiynis	7–5, 3–6, 3–6
Loss	3	9 August 1999	İstanbul, Turkey	Hard	(Armenia) Liudmila Nikoyan	(Belarus) Nadejda Ostrovskaya (Russia) Ekaterina Paniouchkina	0–6, 2–6
Loss	4	27 September 1999	Tbilisi, Georgia	Clay	(Belarus) Nadejda Ostrovskaya	(Russia) Maria Goloviznina (Russia) Ekaterina Paniouchkina	0–6, 2–6
Loss	5	13 February 2000	Birmingham, England	Hard (i)	(Russia) Natalia Egorova	(Russia) Elena Bovina (Ukraine) Anna Zaporozhanova	3–6, 4–6
Loss	6	8 May 2000	Swansea, Wales	Clay	(Russia) Natalia Egorova	(Hungary) Nóra Köves (Serbia and Montenegro) Dragana Zarić	6–2, 4–6, 3–6
Win	5	30 April 2001	Hatfield, England	Clay	(Russia) Natalia Egorova	(United Kingdom) Elena Baltacha (United Kingdom) Nicola Trinder	6–3, 4–6, 6–1
Win	6	7 May 2001	Swansea, Wales	Clay	(Russia) Natalia Egorova	(Russia) Maria Boboedova (Australia) Emily Hewson	4–6, 7–6^{(5)}, 6–0
Loss	7	11 June 2001	Tallinn, Estonia	Clay	(Russia) Natalia Egorova	(Japan) Akiko Morigami (Japan) Miho Saeki	2–6, 6–7^{(7)}
Win	7	8 August 2001	Bath, England	Hard	(Russia) Natalia Egorova	(Germany) Susi Bensch (Italy) Anna Floris	7–6^{(4)}, 7–6^{(4)}
Win	8	9 October 2001	Cardiff, Wales	Carpet (i)	(Russia) Natalia Egorova	(Germany) Angelika Bachmann (Germany) Vanessa Henke	6–4, 1–6, 6–2
Win	9	5 February 2002	Redbridge, England	Hard (i)	(Romania) Magda Mihalache	(United Kingdom) Helen Crook (China) Sun Tiantian	4–6, 6–4, 6–4
Win	10	14 May 2002	Hatfield, England	Clay	(Russia) Irina Bulykina	(United Kingdom) Anna Hawkins (United Kingdom) Jane O'Donoghue	6–4, 4–6, 7–6^{(8)}
Loss	8	1 July 2002	Orbetello, Italy	Clay	(Russia) Evgenia Kulikovskaya	(Estonia) Maret Ani (Romania) Andreea Ehritt-Vanc	3–6, 6–1, 1–6
