= Anna Zaporozhanova =

Ukrainian tennis player

- Country (sports): Ukraine
- Born: 9 August 1979 (age 46) Kyiv, Ukrainian SSR, Soviet Union
- Height: 1.74 m (5 ft 9 in)
- Turned pro: 1994
- Retired: 2008
- Plays: Right-handed (two-handed backhand)
- Prize money: $63,817

Singles
- Career record: 134–88
- Career titles: 4 ITF
- Highest ranking: No. 209 (11 September 2000)

Doubles
- Career record: 106–71
- Career titles: 9 ITF
- Highest ranking: No. 120 (14 August 2000)

Other doubles tournaments
- Olympic Games: 2R (2000)

Anna Oleksandrivna Zaporozhanova (Ukrainian: Анна Олександрівна Запорожанова) is a Ukrainian former professional tennis player. She reached her highest ranking of world No. 209 in September 2000.

Zaporozhanova won a total of 13 titles on the ITF Women's Circuit and also played on the WTA Tour.

Along with Elena Tatarkova, she represented Ukraine at the 2000 Sydney Olympics in the women's doubles event. The pair beat Chinese Taipei duo in round one before losing against France.

== WTA Tour finals ==
=== Doubles: 2 (runner-ups) ===
Legend
Grand Slam
Tier I
Tier II
Tier III, IV & V (0–2)

Result	Date	Tournament	Surface	Partner	Opponents	Score
Loss	May 2000	Warsaw Cup, Poland	Clay	(Uzbekistan) Iroda Tulyaganova	(Italy) Tathiana Garbin (Slovakia) Janette Husárová	3–6, 1–6
Loss	June 2000	Tashkent Open, Uzbekistan	Hard	(Uzbekistan) Iroda Tulyaganova	(China) Li Na (China) Li Ting	6–3, 2–6, 4–6

== ITF finals ==
Legend
$75,000 tournaments
$50,000 tournaments
$25,000 tournaments
$10,000 tournaments

=== Singles: 8 (4–4) ===
Result	No.	Date	Tournament	Surface	Opponent	Score
Win	1.	25 September 1995	ITF Kyiv, Ukraine	Clay	(Ukraine) Talina Beiko	2–6, 7–6^{(4)}, 7–5
Loss	1.	5 October 1997	ITF Tbilisi, Georgia	Clay	(Russia) Nadia Petrova	1–6, 4–6
Win	2.	20 September 1998	ITF Constanta, Romania	Clay	(Romania) Alice Pirsu	7–6, 6–1
Loss	2.	9 May 1999	ITF Hatfield, UK	Clay	(Switzerland) Caecilia Charbonnier	6–7, 4–6
Win	3.	4 July 1999	ITF Tallinn, Estonia	Clay	(Estonia) Kaia Kanepi	6–3, 6–3
Loss	3.	8 August 1999	ITF Kharkiv, Ukraine	Clay	(Ukraine) Tatiana Perebiynis	3–6, 3–6
Loss	4.	13 February 2000	ITF Birmingham, UK	Hard (i)	(Russia) Elena Bovina	1–6, 2–6
Win	4.	1 December 2002	ITF Průhonice, Czech Republic	Clay	(Sweden) Sofia Arvidsson	4–6, 6–4, 6–4

=== Doubles: 20 (9–11) ===
Result	No.	Date	Tournament	Surface	Partner	Opponents	Score
Win	1.	7 August 1995	ITF Rebecq, Belgium	Clay	(Ukraine) Angelina Zdorovitskaia	(Slovakia) Martina Nedelková (Slovakia) Zuzana Nemšáková	6–2, 6–4
Loss	1.	26 August 1996	ITF Kyiv, Ukraine	Clay	(Ukraine) Natalia Medvedeva	(Sweden) Anna-Karin Svensson (Hungary) Réka Vidáts	5–7, 3–6
Loss	2.	8 September 1996	ITF Donetsk, Ukraine	Clay	(Ukraine) Angelina Zdorovitskaia	(Russia) Maria Marfina (Ukraine) Natalia Nemchinova	4–6, 2–6
Win	2.	15 September 1997	ITF Cluj-Napoca, Romania	Clay	(Ukraine) Tatiana Kovalchuk	(Germany) Adriana Barna (Romania) Magda Mihalache	6–4, 5–7, 6–3
Loss	3.	5 October 1997	ITF Tbilisi, Georgia	Clay	(Belarus) Vera Zhukovets	(Russia) Elena Dementieva (Russia) Anastasia Myskina	6–3, 0–6, 4–6
Win	3.	7 February 1998	ITF Birkenhead, UK	Hard (i)	(Italy) Giulia Casoni	(Russia) Natalia Egorova (Russia) Olga Ivanova	6–3, 6–2
Loss	4.	9 May 1998	ITF Prešov, Slovakia	Clay	(Ukraine) Tatiana Kovalchuk	(Czech Republic) Magdalena Zděnovcová (Czech Republic) Jana Lubasová	2–6, 4–6
Loss	5.	17 May 1998	ITF Nitra, Slovakia	Clay	(Ukraine) Tatiana Kovalchuk	(Slovakia) Patrícia Marková (Slovakia) Silvia Uricková	0–6, 3–6
Loss	6.	2 May 1999	ITF Hatfield, UK	Clay	(Russia) Natalia Egorova	(United Kingdom) Victoria Davies (United Kingdom) Kate Warne-Holland	5–7, 1–6
Loss	7.	9 May 1999	ITF Hatfield, UK	Clay	(Estonia) Ilona Poljakova	(United Kingdom) Lydia Perkins (United Kingdom) Julia Smith	1–6, 4–6
Win	4.	6 February 2000	ITF Jersey, UK	Hard (i)	(Russia) Elena Bovina	(Tunisia) Selima Sfar (United Kingdom) Joanne Ward	6–3, 6–2
Win	5.	13 February 2000	ITF Birmingham, UK	Hard (i)	(Russia) Elena Bovina	(Russia) Natalia Egorova (Russia) Ekaterina Sysoeva	6–3, 6–4
Loss	8.	10 April 2000	Open de Cagnes-sur-Mer, France	Hard (i)	(Uzbekistan) Iroda Tulyaganova	(Germany) Angelika Bachmann (Italy) Giulia Casoni	5–7, 1–6
Loss	9.	10 July 2000	ITF Darmstadt, Germany	Clay	(Germany) Adriana Barna	(Slovenia) Maja Matevžič (Italy) Maria Paola Zavagli	6–7^{(4)}, 7–6^{(4)}, 4–6
Win	6.	31 July 2000	ITF Ettenheim, Germany	Clay	(Belarus) Nadejda Ostrovskaya	(Argentina) Mariana Díaz Oliva (Argentina) María Emilia Salerni	6–4, 6–2
Win	7.	26 May 2002	ITF Kyiv, Ukraine	Clay	(Ukraine) Tatiana Kovalchuk	(Belarus) Darya Kustova (Poland) Magdalena Marszałek	6–2, 6–3
Loss	10.	20 April 2003	Open de Biarritz, France	Clay	(Ukraine) Yuliya Beygelzimer	(United Kingdom) Lucie Ahl (Tunisia) Selima Sfar	1–6, 1–6
Loss	11.	1 May 2003	Open de Cagnes-sur-Mer, France	Clay	(Ukraine) Yuliya Beygelzimer	(Russia) Vera Dushevina (Kazakhstan) Galina Voskoboeva	3–6, 4–6
Win	8.	19 May 2003	ITF Lviv, Ukraine	Clay	(Russia) Anna Bastrikova	(Ukraine) Mariya Koryttseva (France) Iryna Brémond	6–4, 6–4
Win	9.	25 May 2007	ITF Cherkassy, Ukraine	Clay	(Ukraine) Katerina Avdiyenko	(Ukraine) Nadiia Kichenok (Ukraine) Lyudmyla Kichenok	7–6^{(3)}, 6–2
