= Vanessa Henke =

German tennis player

- Country (sports): Germany
- Born: 15 January 1981 (age 45)
- Turned pro: 1998
- Retired: 2013
- Plays: Right (two-handed backhand)
- Prize money: $369,593

Singles
- Career record: 283–316
- Career titles: 6 ITF
- Highest ranking: No. 137 (26 September 2005)

Grand Slam singles results
- Australian Open: Q3 (2007)
- French Open: Q2 (2001, 2005, 2006)
- Wimbledon: Q2 (2001, 2002)
- US Open: Q2 (2006, 2007)

Doubles
- Career record: 156–141
- Career titles: 10 ITF
- Highest ranking: No. 110 (8 July 2002)

Grand Slam doubles results
- Australian Open: 1R (2005)
- French Open: 2R (2002)
- Wimbledon: Q2 (2001)
- US Open: 1R (2001)

Vanessa Henke (born 15 January 1981), also known as Vanessa Paffrath, is a German former professional tennis player.

In her career, she won six singles titles and ten doubles titles on the ITF Women's Circuit. Her best singles ranking was world No. 137, achieved on 26 September 2005. On 8 July 2002, she peaked at No. 110 in the WTA doubles rankings.

== Career ==
Henke took part in the qualifying for the 2006 Qatar Ladies Open, but lost in the second round. She also participated at the 2007 Stanford Classic and many other ITF & WTA Tour events.

In 2003, she played one match for the Germany Fed Cup team. Alongside Angelika Rösch, she lost in the World Group play-offs against the pairing of Indonesian team, in straight sets (overall Germany won 3–2).

== WTA Tour finals ==
=== Doubles: 2 (2 runner-ups) ===
Legend
Grand Slam tournaments
Premier M & Premier 5
Premier
International (0–2)

Result	Date	Tournament	Surface	Partner	Opponents	Score
Loss	May 2000	Austrian Open	Clay	(Czech Republic) Lenka Němečková	(Argentina) Paola Suárez (Argentina) Patricia Tarabini	4–6, 2–6
Loss	Jul 2008	Budapest Grand Prix, Hungary	Clay	(Romania) Raluca Olaru	(France) Alizé Cornet (Slovakia) Janette Husárová	7–6^{(7–5)}, 1–6, [6–10]

== ITF Circuit finals ==
Legend
$100,000 tournaments
$75,000 tournaments
$50,000 tournaments
$25,000 tournaments
$10,000 tournaments

=== Singles: 8 (6–2) ===
Result	No.	Date	Tournament	Surface	Opponent	Score
Win	1.	1 March 1999	ITF Buchen, Germany	Carpet (i)	(Germany) Angelika Bachmann	2–6, 6–4, 6–2
Win	2.	17 May 1999	ITF Salzburg, Austria	Clay	(Austria) Nicole Remis	6–7, 6–4, 6–4
Loss	3.	17 July 2000	ITF Puchheim, Germany	Clay	(Czech Republic) Alena Vašková	1–6, 1–6
Win	4.	19 March 2001	ITF Cholet, France	Clay	(France) Sophie Erre	6–7, 6–3, 6–3
Win	5.	14 March 2004	ITF Amiens, France	Clay	(France) Virginie Razzano	7–6^{(9–7)}, 6–4
Win	6.	28 June 2005	ITF Stuttgart, Germany	Clay	(Hungary) Kira Nagy	6–2, 0–6, 6–4
Win	7.	4 July 2005	ITF Darmstadt, Germany	Clay	(Slovakia) Eva Fislová	6–7^{(4–7)}, 1–6
Loss	8.	25 April 2011	ITF Zell am Harmersbach, Germany	Clay	(Germany) Carina Witthöft	6–4, 3–6, 4–6

=== Doubles: 19 (10–9) ===
Result	No.	Date	Tournament	Surface	Partner	Opponents	Score
Loss	1.	28 March 1999	ITF Petroupoli, Greece	Clay	(Hungary) Adrienn Hegedűs	(Netherlands) Jolanda Mens (Netherlands) Andrea van den Hurk	4–6, 3–6
Win	2.	9 April 2000	ITF Dinan, France	Clay	(Germany) Syna Schmidle	(Belgium) Patty Van Acker (France) Stéphanie Foretz	6–7, 6–4, 6–2
Loss	3.	15 April 2001	ITF Dinan, France	Clay	(Germany) Syna Schmidle	(Greece) Eleni Daniilidou (Germany) Caroline Schneider	3–6, 6–7
Win	4.	22 April 2001	ITF Gelos, France	Clay	(Germany) Syna Schmidle	(Spain) Eva Bes (Spain) Lourdes Domínguez Lino	6–2, 6–3
Loss	5.	14 October 2001	ITF Cardiff, Great Britain	Hard (i)	(Germany) Angelika Bachmann	(Russia) Natalia Egorova (Russia) Ekaterina Sysoeva	4–6, 6–1, 2–6
Loss	6.	16 June 2002	Open de Marseille, France	Clay	(Germany) Sandra Klösel	(Spain) Lourdes Domínguez Lino (Spain) Conchita Martínez Granados	5–7, 6–4, 0–6
Win	7.	2 February 2003	ITF Ortisei, Italy	Carpet (i)	(Luxembourg) Claudine Schaul	(Czech Republic) Olga Blahotová (Czech Republic) Gabriela Navrátilová	6–1, 6–2
Loss	8.	29 June 2003	ITF Båstad, Sweden	Clay	(Czech Republic) Lenka Němečková	(Czech Republic) Jana Hlaváčková (Czech Republic) Dominika Luzarová	5–7, 2–6
Win	9.	22 June 2004	ITF Båstad, Sweden	Clay	(Czech Republic) Zuzana Hejdová	(Australia) Mireille Dittmann (Sweden) Hanna Nooni	2–6, 6–2, 6–3
Win	10.	4 July 2004	ITF Stuttgart, Germany	Clay	(Netherlands) Anousjka van Exel	(Ukraine) Mariya Koryttseva (Croatia) Darija Jurak	6–4, 7–5
Win	11.	11 July 2004	ITF Darmstadt, Germany	Clay	(Germany) Martina Müller	(Serbia and Montenegro) Katarina Mišić (Serbia and Montenegro) Dragana Zarić	6–1, 7–5
Loss	12.	21 November 2004	ITF Deauville, France	Clay	(Czech Republic) Květa Peschke	(Hungary) Virág Németh (Israel) Tzipora Obziler	4–6, 1–6
Winner	13.	3 July 2005	ITF Stuttgart, Germany	Clay	(Ukraine) Yuliya Beygelzimer	(Germany) Kristina Barrois (Germany) Kathrin Wörle-Scheller	7–6^{(9–7)}, 6–1
Win	14.	4 July 2005	ITF Darmstadt, Germany	Clay	(Germany) Laura Siegemund	(Russia) Vasilisa Bardina (Kazakhstan) Yaroslava Shvedova	6–4, 6–2
Loss	15.	8 October 2006	ITF Barcelona, Spain	Clay	(Romania) Edina Gallovits-Hall	(Poland) Klaudia Jans (Poland) Alicja Rosolska	1–6, 2–6
Loss	16.	22 April 2007	Dothan Pro Classic, United States	Clay	(Germany) Angelika Bachmann	(Chinese Taipei) Chan Yung-jan (Chinese Taipei) Chuang Chia-jung	2–6, 3–6
Loss	17.	1 July 2007	ITF Padova, Italy	Clay	(Germany) Andrea Petkovic	(Estonia) Maret Ani (New Zealand) Marina Erakovic	4–6, 4–6
Win	18.	26 January 2009	ITF Laguna Niguel, United States	Hard	(Croatia) Darija Jurak	(United States) Megan Moulton-Levy (Germany) Laura Siegemund	4–6, 6–3, [10–8]
Win	19.	13 June 2011	ITF Cologne, Germany	Clay	(Germany) Anna Zaja	(Germany) Carolin Daniels (Germany) Christina Shakovets	1–6, 6–3, 6–4
