= Estonian Tennis Championships =

Estonian Tennis Championships are the national championships in tennis, organised every year by the Estonian Tennis Association from 1920.

== Winners ==
| Year | Men's singles | Women's singles | Men's doubles | Women's doubles | Mixed doubles |
|---|---|---|---|---|---|
| 1920 | Ernst Turmann | Ilse Hesse | John Dollar - Wilhelm von Meyend | not held | Elsa Tofer - John Dollar |
| 1921 | Johann Paulson | Elli Orgussaar | Johann Paulson - Albert von Müller | not held | Elli Orgussaar - Johann Paulson |
| 1922 | Johann Paulson | Salme Kint | Johann Paulson - Aleksander Tammann | not held | Elli Orgussaar - Johann Paulson |
| 1923 | Aleksander Tammann | Ilse Hesse | Eduard Hiop - Elmar Lohk | not held | Leonora Wittlich - Otto Luck |
| 1924 | Johann Paulson | Ilse Hesse | Johann Paulson - Aleksander Tammann | not held | Salme Kint - Elmar Lohk |
| 1925 | Johann Paulson | Ilse Hesse | Johann Paulson - Aleksander Tammann | not held | Aleksandra Paulson - Johann Paulson |
| 1926 | Kristjan Lasn | Ilse Hesse | Johann Paulson - Paul Freiberg | not held | Salme Kint - Arved Kleinberg |
| 1927 | Arved Kleinberg | Ilse Hesse | Hugo Pukk - Elmar Lohk | Aleksandra Paulson - Elli Orgussaar | Aleksandra Paulson - Johann Paulson |
| 1928 | Kristjan Lasn | Ilse Hesse | Johann Paulson - Arved Kleinberg | Ilse Hesse - Nina Berg | Aleksandra Paulson - Johann Paulson |
| 1929 | Kristjan Lasn | Elisabeth Bagh | Hugo Pukk - Elmar Lohk | not held | Aleksandra Paulson - Kristjan Lasn |
| 1930 | Hugo Pukk | Elisabeth Bagh | Kristjan Lasn - Arved Kleinberg | not held | Veera Nõmmik - Kristjan Lasn |
| 1931 | not held | | | | |
| 1932 | Kristjan Lasn | Veera Nõmmik | Hugo Pukk - Elmar Lohk | not held | Eugenie Feldhuhn - Kristjan Lasn |
| 1933 | Kristjan Lasn | Veera Nõmmik | Kristjan Lasn - Arved Kleinberg | not held | Elisabeth Bagh - Heinrich Rosenblatt |
| 1934 | Kristjan Lasn | Veera Nõmmik | Kristjan Lasn - Hugo Pukk | Veera Nõmmik - Irene Alver | Veera Nõmmik - Hugo Pukk |
| 1935 | Hugo Pukk | Veera Nõmmik | Kristjan Lasn - August Tomberg | not held | Veera Nõmmik - Hugo Pukk |
| 1936 | Kristjan Lasn | Veera Nõmmik | Kristjan Lasn - Arved Kleinberg | not held | Veera Nõmmik - August Tomberg |
| 1937 | Egon Meier | Antonina Bagh | Egon Meier - Gottfried Niemann | not held | M. Klein - Egon Meier |
| 1938 | August Tomberg | Veera Nõmmik | Boris Caye - Gerhard Lukk jun | not held | Veera Nõmmik - Elmar Lohk |
| 1939 | Kristjan Lasn | Veera Nõmmik | Evald Kree - Paul Kuus | not held | Veera Nõmmik - Evald Kree |
| 1940 | Kristjan Lasn | Veera Nõmmik | Kristjan Lasn - Alfred Keerd | Veera Nõmmik - Ella Tikenberg | Veera Nõmmik - Evald Kree |
| 1941–44 | not held | | | | |
| 1945 | Ottomar Alas | Paula Press | Ottomar Alas - Evald Kree | Iida Lellep - Benita Kerman | Aino Utso - Ottomar Alas |
| 1946 | Ottomar Alas | Iida Lellep | Ottomar Alas - Evald Kree | Iida Lellep - Benita Kerman | Aino Utso - Ottomar Alas |
| 1947 | Ottomar Alas | Iida Lellep | Ottomar Alas - Evald Kree | Iida Lellep - Benita Kerman | Paula Prass - Guido Taft |
| 1948 | Ottomar Alas | Iida Lellep | Ottomar Alas - Evald Kree | Aleksandra Ivanova - Aino Utso | Aino Utso - Ottomar Alas |
| 1949 | Ottomar Alas | Aleksandra Ivanova | Ottomar Alas - Feliks Tõnuri | Iida Lellep - Aino Utso | Urve Alas - Ottomar Alas |
| 1950 | Guido Taft | Iida Lellep | Heldur Hiop - Harri Kalamäe | Iida Lellep - Aino Utso | Iida Lellep - Feliks Tõnuri |
| 1951 | Harri Kalamäe | Iida Lellep | Heldur Hiop - Harri Kalamäe | Iida Lellep - Aino Utso | Urve Alas - Ottomar Alas |
| 1952 | Heldur Hiop | Velve Kaamann | Heldur Hiop - Harri Kalamäe | Larissa Saare - Lia Steinberg | Talvi Väli - Heldur Hiop |
| 1953 | Heldur Hiop | Talvi Väli | Ottomar Alas - Evald Kree | Velve Kaamann - Leida Randmer | Talvi Väli - Evald Kree |
| 1954 | Heldur Hiop | Velve Kaamann | Tõnu Palm - Eerik Kedars | Velve Kaamann - Lia Steinberg | Velve Kaamann - Heldur Hiop |
| 1955 | Eerik Kedars | Talvi Väli | Tõnu Palm - Eerik Kedars | Velve Tamm (Kaamann) - Lia Steinberg | Velve Tamm - Heldur Hiop |
| 1956 | Heldur Hiop | Velve Tamm | Heldur Hiop - Rein Lüüs | Velve Tamm - Lia Steinberg | Velve Tamm - Heldur Hiop |
| 1957 | Heldur Hiop | Helgi Ustav | Tõnu Palm - Eerik Kedars | Tiio Tikko - Helgi Ustav | Tiio Tikko - Tõnu Palm |
| 1958 | Toomas Leius | Maila Tõruke | Toomas Leius - Jaak Parmas | Made Lindre - Helgi Ustav | Made Lindre - Toomas Leius |
| 1959 | Toomas Leius | Helgi Ustav | Jaak Parmas - Eerik Kedars | Made Lindre - Helgi Ustav | Talvi Märja (Väli) - Jaak Parmas |
| 1960 | Jaak Parmas | Inna Häling | Jaak Parmas - Eerik Kedars | Velve Tamm - Virve Kottav | Velve Tamm - Heldur Hiop |
| 1961 | Toomas Leius | Maria Kull | Toomas Leius - Jüri Lamp | Made Lindre - Helgi Ustav | Made Lindre - Toomas Leius |
| 1962 | Toomas Leius | Tiiu Kivi | Toomas Leius - Mihkel Laasberg | Velve Tamm - Maria Kull | Maria Kull - Toomas Leius |
| 1963 | Toomas Leius | Tiiu Kivi | Jaak Parmas - Eerik Kedars | Velve Tamm - Maria Kull | Maria Kull - Toomas Leius |
| 1964 | Toomas Leius | Tiiu Kivi | Jaak Parmas - Eerik Kedars | Tiiu Kivi - Tiiu Soome | Tiiu Soome - Toomas Leius |
| 1965 | Jaak Parmas | Tiiu Soome | Heldur Hiop - Jaak Parmas | Tiiu Soome - Made Lindre | Made Lindre - Jaak Parmas |
| 1966 | Toomas Leius | Eva Laidvee | Toomas Leius - Jaak Simson | Tiiu Soome - Eva Kärmas | Tiiu Kivi - Toomas Leius |
| 1967 | Peeter Lamp | Tiiu Kivi | Peeter Lamp - Jaak Simson | Tiiu Kivi - Tiiu Simson (Soome) | Tiiu Kivi - Peeter Lamp |
| 1968 | Hindrek Sepp | Tiiu Simson | Endel Nael - Jaak Simson | Tiiu Kivi - Tiiu Simson | Tiiu Kivi - Peeter Lamp |
| 1969 | Ants Juhvelt | Liidia Sinkevitš | Hindrek Sepp - Mait Murss | Liidia Sinkevitš - Aita Kree | Liidia Sinkevitš - Hindrek Sepp |
| 1970 | Toomas Leius | Maria Kull | Sven Eving - Ants Juhvelt | Liidia Sinkevitš - Jelena Komarova | Tiiu Parmas (Kivi) - Toomas Leius |
| 1971 | Hindrek Sepp | Tiiu Simson | Sven Eving - Ants Juhvelt | Maria Kull - Tiiu Simson | Liidia Sinkevitš - Hindrek Sepp |
| 1972 | Toomas Leius | Liidia Sinkevitš | Toomas Leius - Peeter Lamp | Jelena Komarova - Mare Kalberg | Tiiu Simson - Ants Juhvelt |
| 1973 | Hindrek Sepp | Liidia Sinkevitš | Toomas Leius - Sven Eving | Liidia Sinkevitš - Tiiu Parmas | Tiiu Parmas - Toomas Leius |
| 1974 | Sven Eving | Tiiu Parmas | Sven Eving - Tiit Kivistik | Liidia Sinkevitš - Jelena Komarova | Liidia Sinkevitš - Sven Eving |
| 1975 | Peeter Lamp | Liidia Sinkevitš | Sven Eving - Hindrek Sepp | Maria Kull - Jelena Komarova | Jelena Komarova - Tiit Kivistik |
| 1976 | Sven Eving | Tiiu Parmas | Endel Nael - Jaak Simson | Liidia Sinkevitš - Jelena Lapimaa (Komarova) | Liidia Sinkevitš - Sven Eving |
| 1977 | Hindrek Sepp | Liidia Sinkevitš | Ervin Lange - Hindrek Sepp | Liidia Sinkevitš - Tiiu Parmas | Liidia Sinkevitš - Ervin Lange |
| 1978 | Sven Eving | Tiiu Parmas | Sven Eving - Tiit Kivistik | Tiiu Parmas - Jelena Lapimaa | Jelena Lapimaa - Tiit Kivistik |
| 1979 | Ervin Lange | Jelena Lapimaa | Ain Suurthal - Jaak Issak | Liidia Nurme (Sinkevitš) - Tiiu Parmas | Liidia Nurme - Ervin Lange |
| 1980 | Ervin Lange | Jelena Lapimaa | Tiit Kivistik - Alar Milk | Liidia Nurme - Jelena Lapimaa | Jelena Lapimaa - Tiit Kivistik |
| 1981 | Hannes Raschinski | Liidia Nurme | Tiit Kivistik - Alar Milk | Liidia Nurme - Jelena Lapimaa | Jelena Lapimaa - Tiit Kivistik |
| 1982 | Ain Suurthal | Katrin Alvin | Ain Suurthal - Jaak Issak | Jelena Lapimaa - Katrin Alvin | Jelena Lapimaa - Ain Suurthal |
| 1983 | Ain Suurthal | Katrin Alvin | Tiit Kivistik - Alar Milk | Liidia Nurme - Jelena Lapimaa | Katrin Alvin - Ain Suurthal |
| 1984 | Ain Suurthal | Kaja Kõnd | Ain Suurthal - Aivo Ojassalu | Katrin Alvin - Merike Stamberg | Katrin Alvin - Ain Suurthal |
| 1985 | Ain Suurthal | Kaja Kõnd | Ain Suurthal - Jaak Issak | Kaja Kõnd - Merike Stamberg | Merike Stamberg - Ain Suurthal |
| 1986 | Aivo Ojassalu | Marge Laast | Ain Suurthal - Jaak Issak | Kaja Kõnd - Merike Stamberg | Inna Babitš - Ain Suurthal |
| 1987 | Andres Võsand | Kaja Kõnd | Ain Suurthal - Aivo Ojassalu | Piret Kallas - Katrin Sepp | Merike Stamberg - Aivo Ojassalu |
| 1988 | Aivo Ojassalu | Piret Kallas | Alar Milk - Teet Rätsep | Piret Kallas - Katrin Sepp | Piret Kallas - Rene Busch |
| 1989 | Teet Rätsep | Helen Holter | Teet Rätsep - Mart Peterson | Piret Kallas - Katrin Sepp | Kaja Kõnd - Teet Rätsep |
| 1990 | Rene Busch | Helen Holter | Ervin Lange - Alar Milk | Kaja Kõnd - Merike Stamberg | Kaja Kõnd - Ervin Lange |
| 1991 | Aivo Ojassalu | Marje Redel | Ervin Lange - Alar Milk | Piret Ilves (Kallas) - Katrin Sepp | Ilona Poljakova - Aivo Ojassalu |
| 1992 | Rene Busch | Kaja Kõnd | Andrei Luzgin - Alti Vahkal | Kaja Kõnd - Ilona Poljakova | Kaja Kõnd - Aivo Ojassalu |
| 1993 | Rene Busch | Kaja Kõnd | Andrei Luzgin - Alti Vahkal | Kaja Kõnd - Ande Tulp | Ande Tulp - Andrei Luzgin |
| 1994 | Rene Busch | Helen Holter | Rene Busch - Sten Sumberg | Piret Ilves - Kersti Orek | Helina Lill - Alti Vahkal |
| 1995 | Rene Busch | Helen Holter | Rene Busch - Ivar Troost | Helina Lill - Liina Suurvarik | Helina Lill - Alti Vahkal |
| 1996 | Rene Busch | Helen Holter | Andrei Luzgin - Raigo Saluste | Helina Lill - Liina Suurvarik | Piret Ilves - Raigo Saluste |
| 1997 | Rene Busch | Helen Holter | Andrei Luzgin - Ivar Troost | Maret Ani - Liina Suurvarik | Liina Suurvarik - Andrei Luzgin |
| 1998 | Alti Vahkal | Helen Holter | Mait Künnap - Gert Vilms | Piret Ilves - Liina Suurvarik | Helina Lill - Alti Vahkal |
| 1999 | Alti Vahkal | Kaia Kanepi | Alti Vahkal - Mait Künnap | Kaia Kanepi - Margit Rüütel | Helina Lill - Alti Vahkal |
| 2000 | Andrei Luzgin | Kaia Kanepi | Alti Vahkal - Mait Künnap | Kaia Kanepi - Katri Miller | Kaia Kanepi - Mait Künnap |
| 2001 | Andrei Luzgin | Piret Ilves | Andrei Luzgin - Gert Vilms | Piret Ilves - Helina Lill | Piret Ilves - Andrei Luzgin |
| 2002 | Gert Vilms | Margit Rüütel | Alti Vahkal - Mait Künnap | Margit Rüütel - Katri Miller | Anet Kaasik - Andres Angerjärv |
| 2003 | Mait Künnap | Margit Rüütel | Toomas Veskimägi - Rauno Gull | Margit Rüütel - Ilona Poljakova | Anet Kaasik - Ivar Troost |
| 2004 | Andrei Luzgin | Margit Rüütel | Oskar Saarne - Mihkel Koppel | Margit Rüütel - Erika Bekker | Margit Rüütel - Andrei Luzgin |
| 2005 | Jürgen Zopp | Jekaterina Jeritševa | Jürgen Zopp - Mikk Irdoja | Piret Ilves - Katrin Sepp | not held |
| 2006 | Jürgen Zopp | Margit Rüütel | Oskar Saarne - Mihkel Koppel | Margit Rüütel - Ilona Poljakova | Anett Schutting - Rene Busch |
| 2007 | Jaak Põldma | Kaia Kanepi | Alti Vahkal - Mait Künnap | Kaia Kanepi - Maret Ani | Margit Rüütel - Jürgen Zopp |
| 2008 | Jaak Põldma | Margit Rüütel | Mait Künnap - Jürgen Zopp | Margit Rüütel - Anett Schutting | Margit Rüütel - Jürgen Zopp |
| 2009 | Jürgen Zopp | Anett Kontaveit | Mait Künnap - Jürgen Zopp | Piret Ilves - Liina Suurvarik | Kaia Kanepi - Mikk Irdoja |
| 2010 | Jürgen Zopp | Anett Kontaveit | Mait Künnap - Jürgen Zopp | Anett Kontaveit - Ilona Poljakova | Margit Rüütel - Vladimir Ivanov |
| 2011 | Jaak Põldma | Tatjana Vorobjova | Mait Künnap - Jürgen Zopp | Eva Paalma - Tatjana Vorobjova | Piret Ilves - Mait Künnap |
| 2012 | Vladimir Ivanov | Eva Paalma | Mait Künnap - Vladimir Ivanov | Eva Paalma - Tatjana Vorobjova | Tatjana Vorobjova - Vladimir Ivanov |
| 2013 | Vladimir Ivanov | Eva Paalma | Morten Ritslaid - Markus Kerner | Eva Paalma - Tatjana Vorobjova | Eva Paalma - Morten Ritslaid |
| 2014 | Vladimir Ivanov | Anett Kontaveit | Vladimir Ivanov - Anton Pavlov | Eva Paalma - Julia Matojan | Julia Matojan - Vladimir Ivanov |
| 2015 | Vladimir Ivanov | Maria Lota Kaul | Vladimir Ivanov - Markus Kerner | Eva Paalma - Julia Skripnik (Matojan) | Eva Paalma - Vladimir Ivanov |
| 2016 | Vladimir Ivanov | Maria Lota Kaul | Vladimir Ivanov - Markus Kerner | Piret Ilves - Liina Suurvarik | Anett Mäelt - Morten Ritslaid |
| 2017 | Kristjan Tamm | Sofiya Chekhlystova | Mattias Siimar - Kristofer Siimar | Viktoria Kleer Kliimand - Elena Malõgina | Sofiya Chekhlystova - Morten Ritslaid |
| 2018 | Vladimir Ivanov | Katriin Saar | Siim Troost - Robin Erik Parts | Anet Angelika Koskel - Helena Narmont | Maileen Nuudi - Karl Kiur Saar |
| 2019 | Vladimir Ivanov | Katriin Saar | Mattias Siimar - Kristofer Siimar | Anet Angelika Koskel - Helena Narmont | Elena Malõgina - Vladimir Ivanov |
| 2020 | Vladimir Ivanov | Elena Malõgina | Vladimir Ivanov - Mattias Siimar | Anet Angelika Koskel - Helena Narmont | Elena Malõgina - Vladimir Ivanov |
| 2021 | Vladimir Ivanov | Maria Lota Kaul | Vladimir Ivanov - Mattias Siimar | Sofiya Chekhlystova - Elena Malõgina | Maileen Nuudi - Karl Kiur Saar |
| 2022 | Kristjan Tamm | Elena Malõgina | Aleksander Georg Mändma - Robin Erik Parts | Sofiya Chekhlystova - Elena Malõgina | Grete Gull - Johannes Seeman |
