= One team in Tallinn =

1996 cancelled association football game

- Event: 1998 FIFA World Cup qualification
| Estonia | Scotland |
| (Estonia) | (Scotland) |
| – | – |
- Match was abandoned after three seconds due to Estonian team boycott FIFA orders the match to be rescheduled for 11 February 1997 at a neutral site
- Date: 9 October 1996
- Venue: Kadrioru Stadium, Tallinn
- Referee: Miroslav Radoman (FR Yugoslavia)
- Attendance: 1,000

"One team in Tallinn" refers to a football match scheduled for 9 October 1996 in World Cup qualifying European Group 4 between the national teams of Estonia and Scotland. The match was abandoned after three seconds because the Estonian team were absent from the Kadrioru Stadium due to a dispute over its floodlights. Scotland expected to be awarded a walkover victory, but FIFA ordered that the match be replayed on neutral territory. The replayed match, staged at the Stade Louis II in Monaco, ended in a goalless draw.

== Background ==
Estonia and Scotland were drawn in Group 4 along with Austria, Belarus, Latvia and Sweden. Both nations failed to get their campaign off to a winning start in August, Estonia losing 1–0 away to Belarus and Scotland drawing 0–0 away to Austria. On 5 October however, both won their games to leave just one point between the teams heading into the Tallinn meeting.

== Pre-match controversy ==
Scotland trained at the Kadrioru Stadium the night before the game, where they found the temporary floodlighting the game was to be played under inadequate and protested to FIFA. After a meeting of the FIFA executive committee the following morning, the scheduled 18:45 EEST kickoff time was brought forward to 15:00 EEST. The Estonian Football Association were unhappy with the logistical consequences of the switch, such as the potential loss of television revenue: BBC Scotland had acquired the rights to show the game in Scotland, but the earlier kickoff conflicted with a live broadcast of the memorial service for the Dunblane massacre that afternoon. The Estonian team refused to change their plans while Scotland prepared for the revised time. Team manager Craig Brown later said he had it in mind that the likeliest occurrence was for the Estonian team to show up late, to protest the decision, but for the game to go ahead anyway.

== Kick-off and abandonment ==
Referee Miroslav Radoman led the Scots out onto the pitch, with Scotland's Tartan Army supporters taking the unusual situation in good humour with the chant "One team in Tallinn, There's only one team in Tallinn", to the tune of "Guantanamera". Billy Dodds kicked the game off and captain John Collins took one touch of the ball before Radoman blew the whistle and abandoned the game. After the abandonment, some Scottish supporters played their own game on the Kadrioru Stadium pitch.

The Estonian team arrived at the stadium later in the afternoon, preparing for the original kick-off time. The Scotland team had already left the stadium to begin their journey home.

9 October 1996
15:00 EET

| Estonia | v | Scotland |
|---|---|---|
| | Report |

Kadriorg Stadium, Tallinn
Attendance: 1,000
Referee: Miroslav Radoman (FR Yugoslavia)

| GK | Andy Goram (Rangers) |
| DF | Jackie McNamara (Celtic) |
| DF | Tom Boyd (Celtic) |
| DF | Colin Calderwood (Tottenham Hotspur) |
| DF | Tosh McKinlay (Celtic) |
| MF | Craig Burley (Chelsea) |
| MF | Paul Lambert (Borussia Dortmund) |
| MF | John Collins (AS Monaco) (c) |
| CF | John McGinlay (Bolton Wanderers) |
| CF | Billy Dodds (Aberdeen) |
| CF | Darren Jackson (Hibernian) |
Manager:
Craig Brown

== Aftermath ==
Scotland initially believed that they would be awarded the match by a default score of 3–0, which appeared to be confirmed by the FIFA match delegate. FIFA regulations stated this should be the case "except in cases of force majeure recognised by the organising committee". A similar situation had occurred in the Soviet Union vs Chile 1974 FIFA World Cup play-off, where the Soviets refused to play in the venue chosen by the Chileans for the match to be played in Chile. In that case Chile were awarded the tie by default and qualified for the 1974 FIFA World Cup. This view was contradicted by Lennart Johansson, who was president of UEFA and a vice-president of FIFA.

The FIFA executive committee, chaired by Johansson, met in November. Instead of awarding the match to Scotland, FIFA ordered that the match should be replayed on a neutral ground. This decision was criticised by Scottish observers who believed that Johansson wanted to give Sweden, his native country, the best possible chance of qualification. It also meant that Scotland captain Gary McAllister, who had been suspended for the original fixture against Estonia, was instead suspended for a match against Sweden.

The match was replayed on 11 February 1997 at the Stade Louis II in Monaco and ended in a goalless draw. Estonian goalkeeper Mart Poom put in a strong performance. He later credited the match as an important point in his career, as scouts from Derby County were watching and he signed for the English club the following month. Scotland players and supporters were frustrated at failing to score, with midfielder Ian Ferguson caught on a microphone swearing at the Tartan Army as he walked off the field. It was also the final international appearance for striker Duncan Ferguson (no relation to Ian), whose relationship with the Scottish Football Association was already damaged after he felt he had been treated unfairly following an incident in a match which saw him jailed for assault. He later declined to make himself available for international selection.

Despite this setback, Scotland finished second in Group 4, two points ahead of Sweden and two points behind group winners Austria. Their total of 23 points meant that Scotland were the highest-placed runner-up in the European qualifying groups and therefore qualified directly for the World Cup finals. Estonia finished fifth in Group 4 and did not qualify.

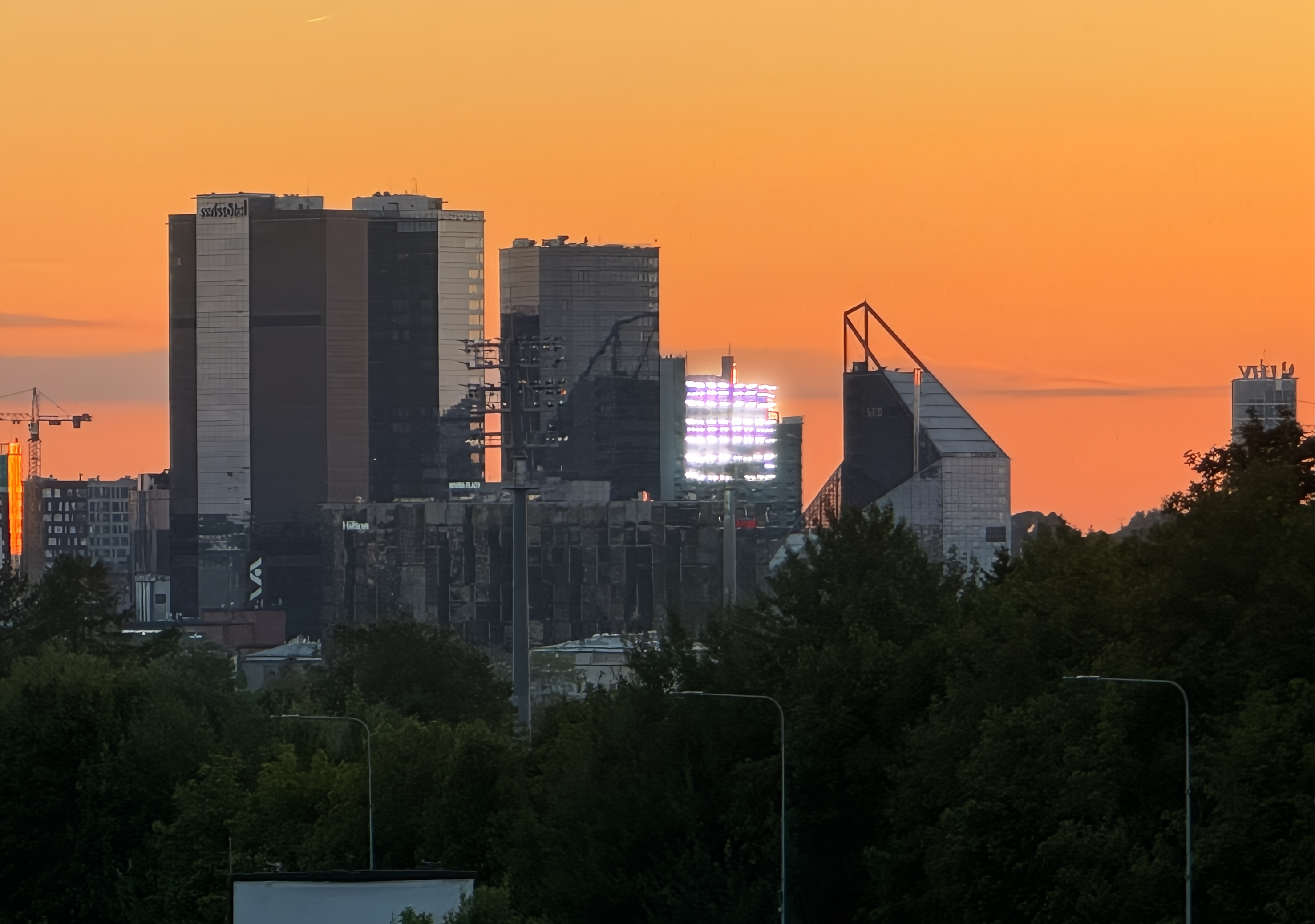
Kadriorg Stadium floodlights as seen from distance, with Maakri high-rises in the background (2025)

In the 2021 BBC documentary Away With The Tartan Army – Scotland's Best Moments hosted by Off the Ball's Stuart Cosgrove and Tam Cowan, "One Team In Tallinn" was ranked as the ninth greatest Scotland supporting memory ranked by a group of journalists, pundits and former players.

As part of The Terrace Scottish Football Podcast's run down of the 50 most memorable Scotland matches, ″One Team In Tallinn″ was voted to be number 11 on this list, despite host Craig Fowler describing it as ″technically not a match″.

In 2024, more than 27 years after the "One Team in Tallinn" match, permanent floodlights were installed at Kadriorg Stadium.

== Match details ==
1998 FIFA World Cup qualification
11 February 1997
20:00 CET
Round 6th.

| Estonia | 0–0 | Scotland |
|---|---|---|
| | Report |

Stade Louis II, Monaco
Attendance: 3,766
Referee: Miroslav Radoman (FR Yugoslavia)

| Estonia | Scotland |

| GK | 1 | Mart Poom (Flora Tallinn) (c) |
| DF | 2 | Marek Lemsalu (Flora Tallinn) |
| DF | 7 | Meelis Rooba (Flora Tallinn) | | (substituted off) 67' |
| DF | 14 | Urmas Kirs (Flora Tallinn) |
| MF | 8 | Liivo Leetma (Flora Tallinn) | | (substituted off) 75' |
| DF | 4 | Sergei Hohlov-Simson (Lelle SK) |
| DF | 3 | Urmas Rooba (Flora Tallinn) |
| MF | 10 | Martin Reim (Flora Tallinn) |
| MF | 9 | Marko Kristal (Flora Tallinn) |
| CF | 5 | Indrek Zelinski (Flora Tallinn) | (yellow card) 55' |
| MF | 6 | Viktor Alonen (Flora Tallinn) | (yellow card) 31' |
Substitutions:
| GK | | Martin Kaalma (Lelle SK) |
| DF | | Janek Meet (Flora Tallinn) |
| DF | | Raivo Nõmmik (Flora Tallinn) |
| DF | | Gert Olesk (Lelle SK) |
| MF | 17 | Mati Pari (Lelle SK) | | (substituted on) 67' |
| FW | | Argo Arbeiter (Lelle SK) |
| FW | 11 | Andres Oper (Flora Tallinn) | | (substituted on) 75' |
Manager:
(Iceland) Teitur Thordarson

| GK | 1 | Andy Goram (Rangers) |
| DF | 2 | Jackie McNamara (Celtic) | (yellow card) 72' | (substituted off) 75' |
| DF | 3 | Tom Boyd (Celtic) |
| DF | 4 | Colin Calderwood (Tottenham Hotspur) |
| DF | 5 | Colin Hendry (Blackburn Rovers) |
| MF | 8 | Paul McStay (Celtic) | | (substituted off) 63' |
| MF | 10 | Gary McAllister (Coventry City) (c) | (yellow card) 88' |
| MF | 7 | John Collins (AS Monaco) | (yellow card) 40' |
| CF | 11 | John McGinlay (Bolton Wanderers) | | (substituted off) 72' |
| CF | 9 | Duncan Ferguson (Everton) |
| CF | 6 | Kevin Gallacher (Blackburn Rovers) |
Substitutions:
| GK | | Jim Leighton (Hibernian) |
| DF | 13 | Tosh McKinlay (Celtic) | | (substituted on) 75' |
| MF | | Eoin Jess (Coventry City) |
| MF | | Paul Lambert (Borussia Dortmund) |
| MF | | Billy McKinlay (Blackburn Rovers) |
| MF | 18 | Ian Ferguson (Rangers) | | (substituted on) 63' |
| FW | 16 | Ally McCoist (Rangers) | | (substituted on) 72' |
Manager:
Craig Brown

Assistant referees:
(Federal Republic of Yugoslavia) Dusan Djukelić (FR Yugoslavia)
(Federal Republic of Yugoslavia) Stanko Matić (FR Yugoslavia)
Fourth official:
(Federal Republic of Yugoslavia) Zoran Arsić (FR Yugoslavia)

Match rules

- 90 minutes.
- Seven named substitutes.
- Maximum of three substitutions.

== See also ==
- Estonia national football team 1996
- Estonia national football team 1997
- Scotland national football team 1980–99 results
- Scotland national football team results (unofficial matches)
