= Talvi =

Talvi Is a surname. Notable people with the surname include:

- Aino Talvi (1909–1992), Estonian stage, film, and radio actress and singer
- Ernesto Talvi (born 1957), Uruguayan economist and politician
- Ilkka Talvi (born 1948), Finnish violinist and blogger
- Jussi Talvi (1920–2007), Finnish writer
- Sven Lokka, pen name Oskar Talvi (1924–2008), Soviet and Russian Finnish writer and painter
- Tiina Talvi (born 1962), Estonian biologist and malacologist

== See also ==
- Talvi Märja (born 1935), Estonian tennis player
