= Elmar Lohk =

Estonian architect (1901–1963)

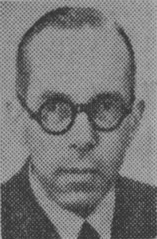
- Born: 15 June 1901; Vladivostok
- Died: 11 February 1963 (aged 61)
- Education: Technical University of Darmstadt
- Occupations: Architect, tennis player
- Buildings: Scandic Hotel Palace

Elmar Lohk (15 June 1901 – 11 February 1963) was an Estonian architect and tennis player. Many of his buildings in Tallinn are now valued as great examples of 1930s architecture, for example, the prominent Scandic Hotel Palace on Freedom Square. His creation can be categorised as functionalism with some influence of Chicago school and traditional art.

He also played tennis and has won Estonian Championships titles in doubles.

== Biography and career ==
Elmar Lohk attended school in Vladivostok and worked in Shanghai. He then studied architecture in Darmstadt University of Technology 1921-1925 and started to work in Tallinn in 1926.

In 1930s, he designed several significant and visually impressive buildings in Tallinn: „EEKS-house“ 10 Vabaduse square (1937), Palace hotel (1937), National Health Service Building in Tõnismäe (1939), and the Kopli Community Centre (1937). The best example of this kind of representative architecture was the reviewing stand at the Kadriorg stadium (1937 with August Komendant, an engineer who later became a constructor for Louis Kahn). In addition to larger buildings, Lohk designed a number of remarkable villas: 24 Kase str, Maasika str 4/6, Lahe str 6. Among his well-known buildings are the „Kalev“ club in Kaarli Avenue (1932), dwelling houses 12 Raua str and 14 Raua str and the chapel of Pühavaimu parish in the Rahumäe Cemetery (1932).

Lohk won several prizes for architecture in international competitions: the Officer's Casino in Kaunas, Tallinn Town Hall and the Tallinn Art Museum.

In 1940, during the Soviet occupation Lohk's wife Ilse and his parents were deported to Siberia, he himself had to seek refuge abroad. In 1943, Lohk worked in Finland at Alvar Aalto's bureau, in 1944 he moved to Sweden. In 1944, Lohk won the first prize in the competition for Sahlgrenska University Hospital in Gothenburg. He was involved in the project work of the hospital until its completion in 1959. Elmar Lohk died in 1963.

== Gallery ==
Scandic Hotel Palace in Tallinn, built in 1936.

Scandic Hotel Palace from a different angle.

An office building on Vabaduse Square in Tallinn, from 1936.

Closer look at the Chicago-influenced façade.

Villa Näituse t 23
