= Kadriorg Stadium =

Stadium in Tallinn, Estonia

Kadrioru staadion
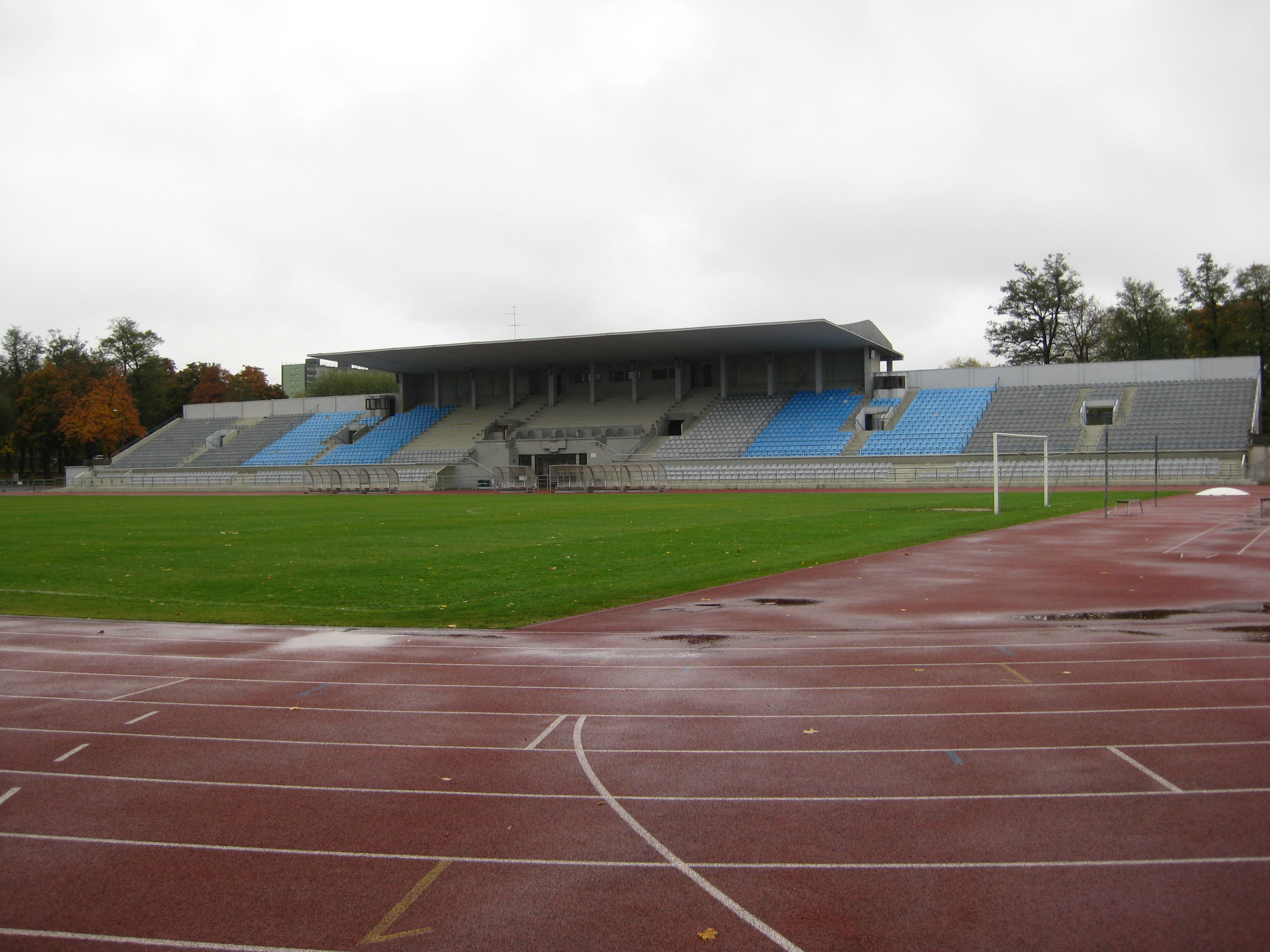
- Interactive map of Kadrioru staadion
- Former names: Dünamo staadion
- Location: Tallinn, Estonia
- Coordinates: 59°26′4.10″N 24°47′0.40″E
- Capacity: 5,000
- Surface: Grass
- Record attendance: 15,000 (Tallinn vs Riga, 18 August 1942)
- Field size: 105 m × 66 m (344 ft × 217 ft)

Construction
- Groundbreaking: 1923
- Opened: 13 June 1926; 100 years ago
- Renovated: 1936–1938, 1974, 1884–1986, 2000, 2011
- Architects: Renner (stadium complex); Karl Burman (1926); Elmar Lohk (1938)
- Structural engineer: August Komendant (1938)

Tenants
- Estonia national football team (1926–1940, 1992–2000); FC Flora (1990–2001); FCI Levadia (2000–2018); JK Tallinna Kalev (2020–present)

Kadriorg Stadium (Estonian: Kadrioru staadion) is a multi-purpose stadium in Tallinn, Estonia. Opened in 1926, it is one of the oldest stadiums in Estonia. It serves as the national athletics stadium of Estonia and as the home ground of JK Tallinna Kalev. The stadium holds 5,000. Kadriorg Stadium is located about 2 km east of the city centre in the subdistrict of Kadriorg, near Kadriorg Palace. The address of the stadium is Roheline aas 24, 10150 Tallinn.

Kadriorg has been the national athletics stadium of the nation throughout its entire history and was the home ground of the Estonia national football team from its opening in 1926 until the Soviet occupation of Estonia in 1940, and again after the country's re-independence from 1992 until 2000, after which the team moved to A. Le Coq Arena. Throughout its history, Kadriorg Stadium has at some point been the home ground for nearly all of the top-flight football teams of Tallinn, such as FC Flora, Levadia, Kalev, Nõmme Kalju, TJK Legion and TVMK.

Kadriorg Stadium has hosted the European Athletics U23 Championships in 2015 and 2021, as well as the European Athletics U20 Championships in 2011 and 2021. It was also one of the venues for the 2012 UEFA European U19 Championship.

== History ==
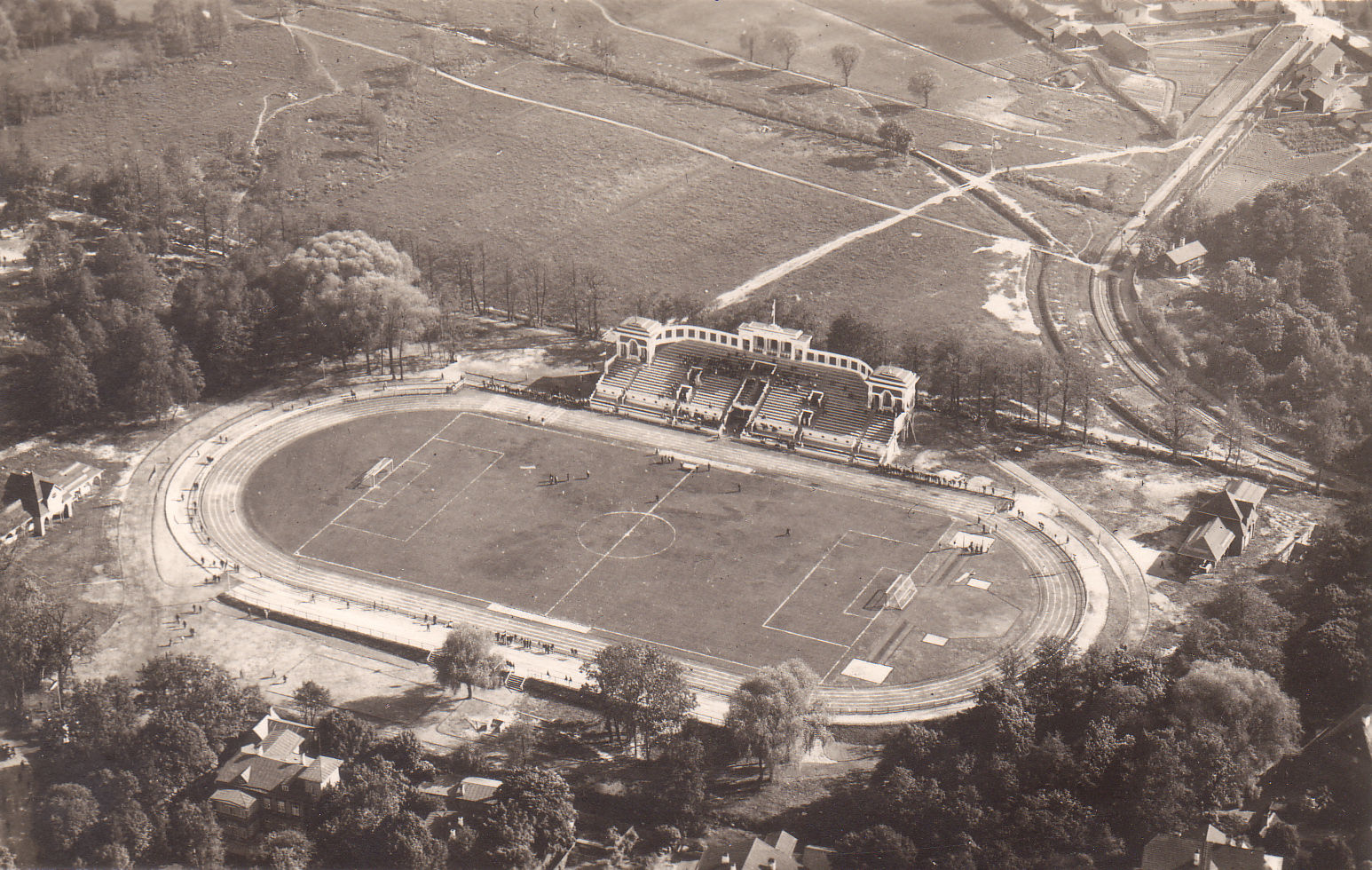
The first wooden grandstand was initially built to be the stage for the 1923 Estonian Song Festival held at the same location and was later modified to become the 2,500-seat grandstand of the new stadium

Kadriorg Stadium was opened on 13 June 1926, eight years after Estonia had become independent. The stadium's opening event was attended by 15,000 people and saw Estonia beat Lithuania 3–1 in football. The stadium complex was designed by German architect Renner and the first wooden grandstand by Estonian architect Karl Burman. Upon completion, the stadium was inaugurated as the country's national stadium and was considered to be the finest of the Baltic states.

Despite its grand look, the 2,500-capacity grandstand quickly proved to be too small to facilitate the growing number of spectators and underwent an expansion in 1934, before an inspection in 1935 found the wooden structure to be in need of immediate repairs as it was in danger of collapsing.

A design competition for a new grandstand was held in the spring of 1936 and the project of Estonian architect Elmar Lohk was chosen, mainly due to his innovative solution to lead the spectators to their seats through passages from the back of the grandstand, unlike the then commonly used approach in Europe that often saw spectators enter the stand from the front. The construction began in late 1936 and was finished in a year, by late 1937.

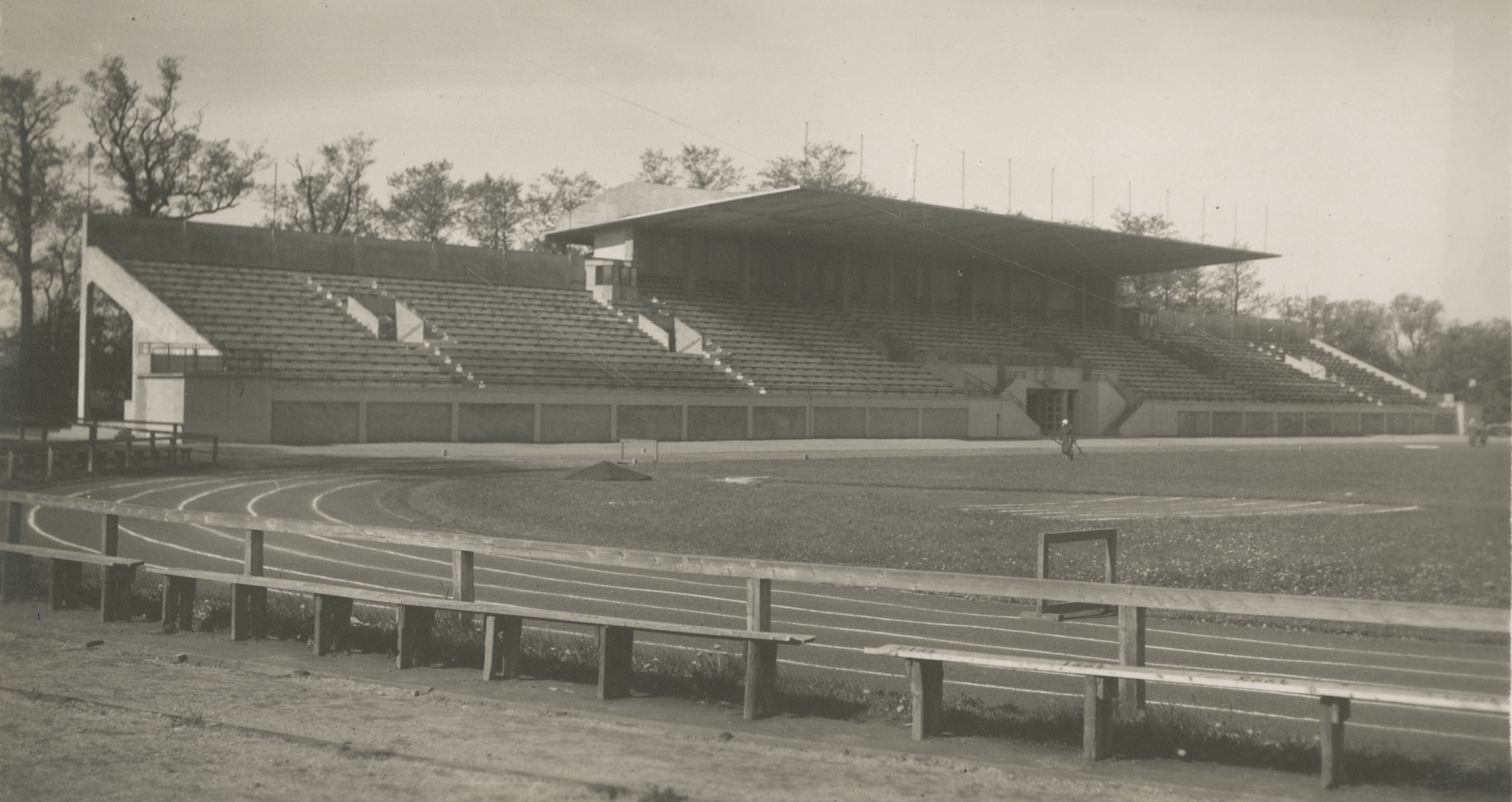
Kadriorg Stadium's roof was believed to be the largest cantilever concrete roof in the world after its completion in 1937

With its freestanding concrete roof, the new grandstand was believed to be one of the most modern in Europe at the time and was seen as an outstanding achievement in the field of reinforced concrete structures. The stadium was officially re-opened on 15 May 1938 with great celebration by the first president of Estonia Konstantin Päts. The opening event saw Estonia draw 1–1 with RC Strasbourg in front of 8,000 people. A year later, World War II had reached Estonia and the country was occupied by the Soviet Union, after which Kadriorg Stadium was renamed as Dünamo staadion.

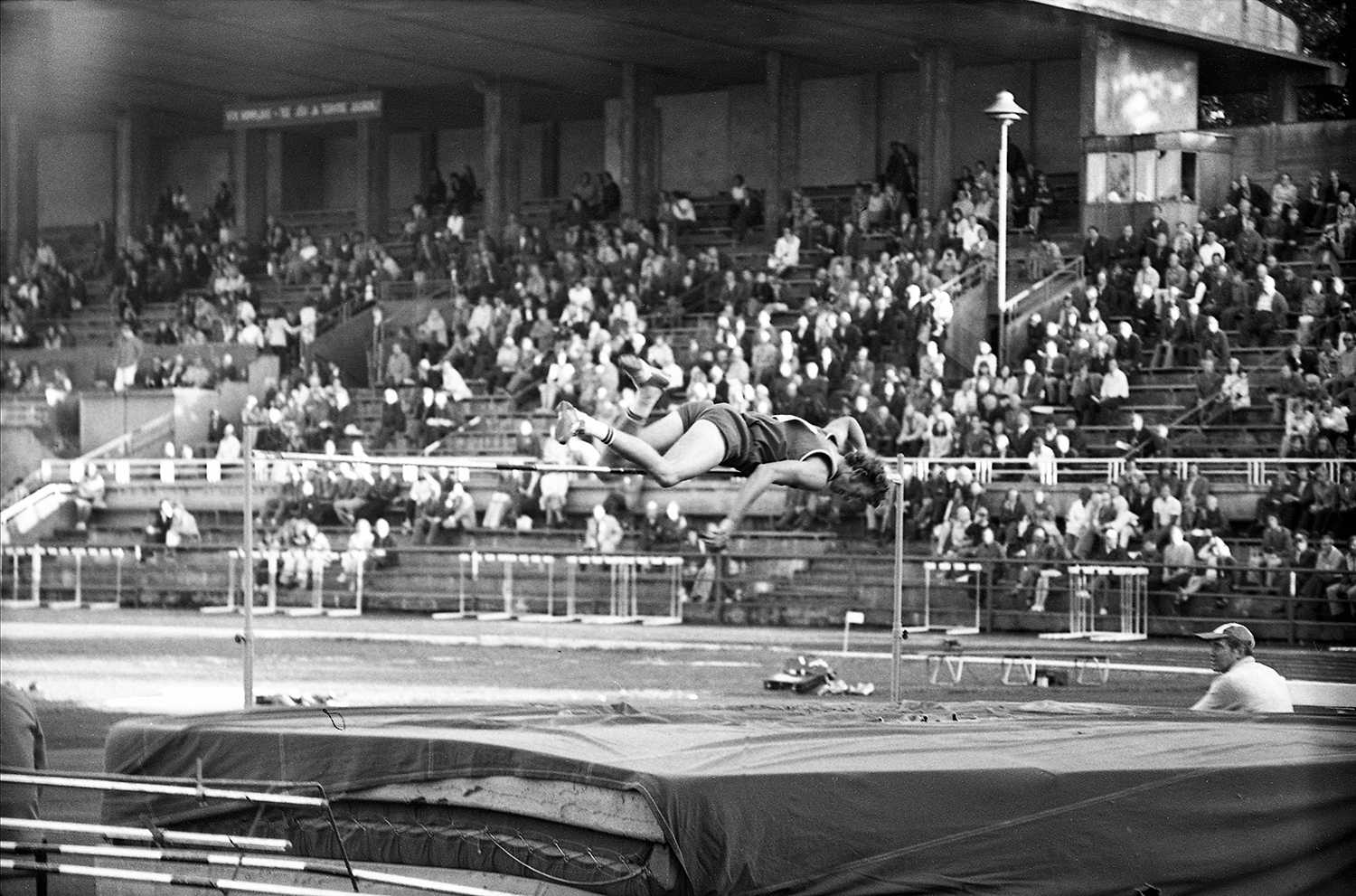
Soviet Union - USA - West Germany decathlon event (1974)

During the Soviet occupation, the stadium continued to be one of the primary sports venues of the region and hosted a number of international and Soviet wide athletics competitions, most notably the Soviet Union – USA – West Germany decathlon event in 1974 and the Soviet Union – East Germany athletics competition in 1986. The 1986 event also saw two athletics world records set in Kadriorg, when Yuriy Sedykh set a world record of 86.66 m in hammer throw and Heike Drechsler a world record of 7.45 m in women's long jump.

In 1992, the stadium hosted the first match of the Estonia national football team after the country's re-independence, when Estonia drew 1–1 with Slovenia. It was also the location of the infamous "One team in Tallinn" fixture between Estonia and Scotland, which was abandoned after three seconds when the home team refused to turn up, in protest at the game's kick-off time being brought forward several hours. The national team's last match in Kadriorg took place on 3 September 2000 against Portugal, after which the team moved to A. Le Coq Arena.

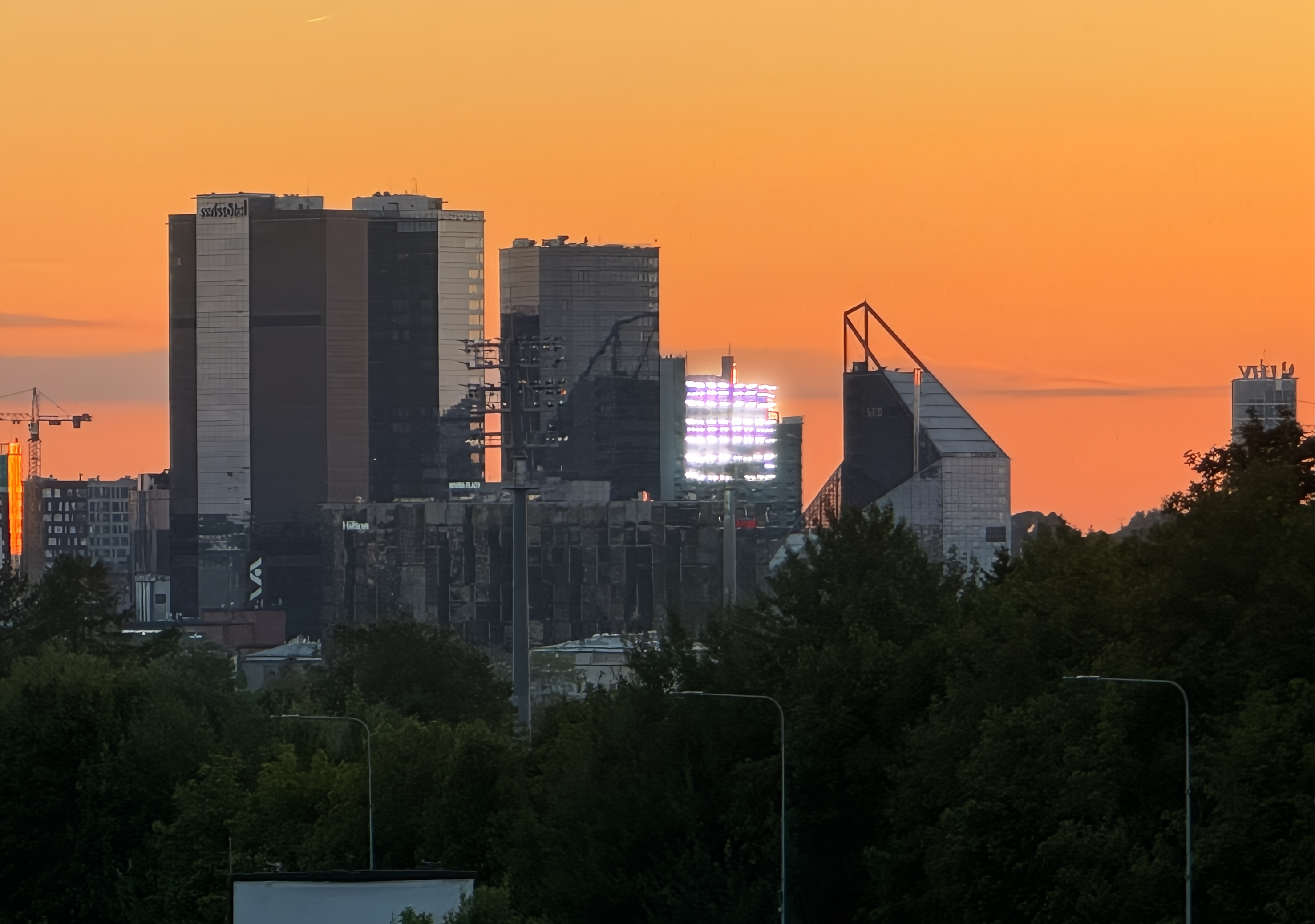
Kadriorg Stadium received floodlights in 2024, more than 27 years after "One team in Tallinn"

In 2011, Kadriorg Stadium hosted the 21st European Athletics Junior Championships. The stadium was one of the venues for the 2012 UEFA European U19 Championship and hosted three group stage matches. In 2015, the stadium hosted the U23 European Athletics Championships. In 2021, Kadriorg hosted both U20 and U23 European Athletics Championships.

== Future ==
For Kadriorg Stadium's 100th birthday in 2026, the City of Tallinn will renovate the complex for €20 million. The renovation will see the complete refurbishment of the sports field and the historic grandstand, as well as the construction of a new 1,600-seat stand on the opposite side of the field. Additionally, a new 1,000-seat football ground will be built behind the main stadium, next to the current athletics training field. The new football ground will also have its own administrative building that would be connected with the grandstand by a planned tunnel. The first works began in 2023, when floodlights were installed for the main stadium and its both training fields.

== Grandstand ==
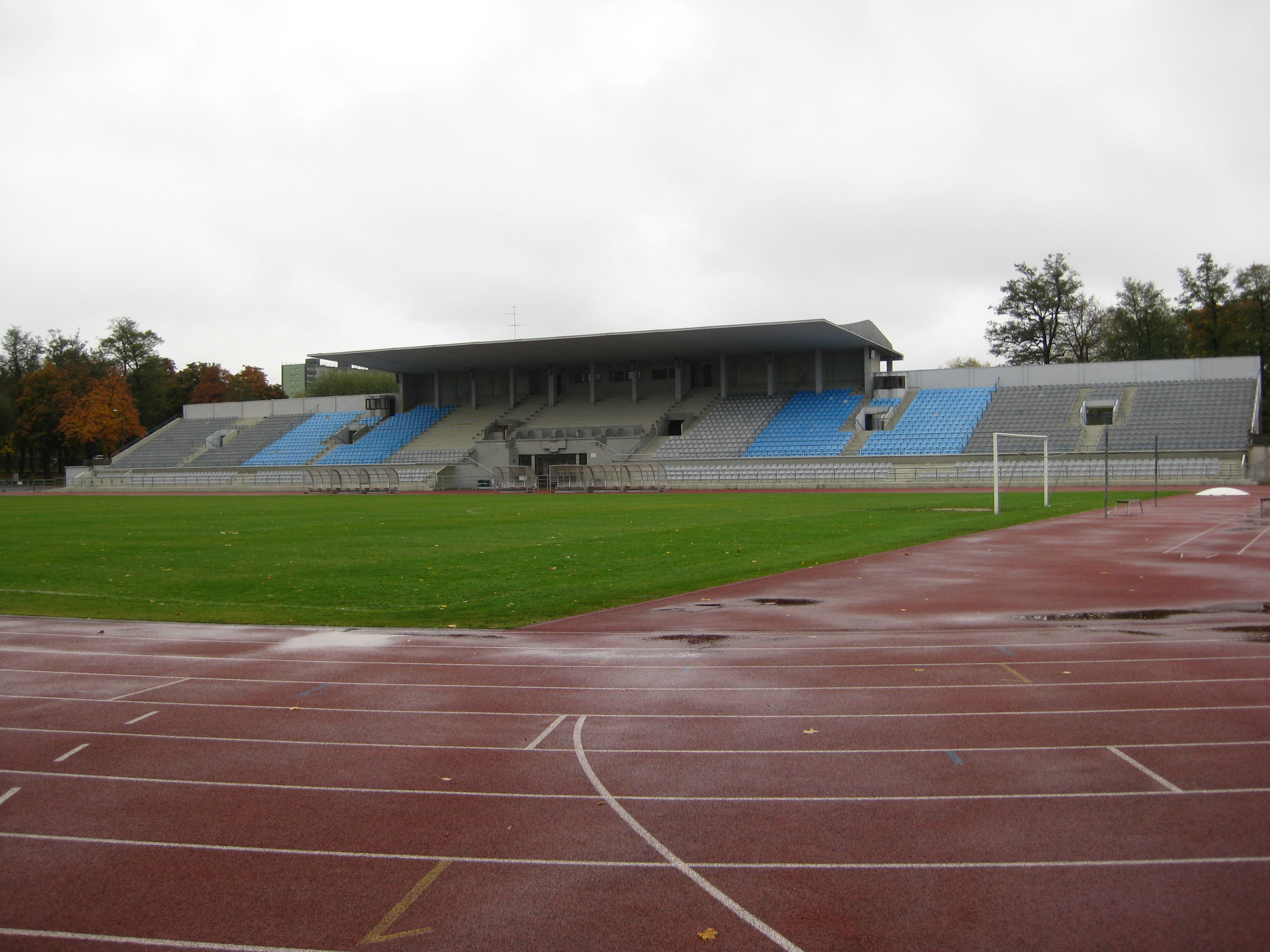
The current grandstand was built during Estonia's first period of independence

Kadriorg Stadium's current grandstand was opened in 1938 and is an official cultural heritage monument. Designed by architect Elmar Lohk and famous engineer August Komendant, it was seen during its time as an outstanding achievement in the field of reinforced concrete structures and was mostly noted for its 12.8 m long and 51 m wide cantilever concrete roof, among the largest in the world at the time after Stadio Artemio Franchi. The grandstand has also been brought out by world-famous architectural critic Kenneth Frampton as one of the most outstanding and historic concrete structures in Estonia.

The grandstand's capacity is 3,524 seats and the opposite stand has 1,476 seats.

== Athletics records ==
=== World records ===
Kadriorg Stadium has seen three world records in athletics. The first two were set during the 1986 Soviet Union – East Germany athletics competition, where Yuriy Sedykh set a world record of 86.66 m in the hammer throw and Heike Drechsler a world record of 7.45 m in women's long jump. The stadium saw its third world record in 2006, when Tatyana Lysenko threw 77.80 m in women's hammer throw.

=== Stadium records ===
Updated on 1 January 2024.

==== Men ====
Event	Record	Athlete	Nationality	Date	Ref
100 m	10.07	Jimmy Vicaut	France	22.07.2011	
200 m	20.25	Jaysuma Saidy Ndure	Norway	22.07.2007	
400 m	45.02	Ricky Petrucciani	Switzerland	10.07.2021	
800 m	1:45.73	Curtis Robb	United Kingdom	09.06.1996	
1000 m	2:24.10	Oleg Holdai	Estonia	19.07.1996	
1500 m	3:38.90	Jukka Keskisalo	Finland	25.08.2009	
Mile	3:59.93	Nikolai Vedehin	Estonia	25.08.2012	
2000 m	5:14.4	Ain Mõnjam	Estonia	20.08.1986	
3000 m	7:52.46	James Getanda	Kenya	30.07.2003	
5000 m	13:20.16	Ali Kaya	Turkey	11.07.2015	
10,000 m	27:53.38	Ali Kaya	Turkey	09.07.2015	
20,000 m	1:03:00.8	Stepan Baidiuk	Ukraine	1975	
110 m hurdles	13.31	Stanislavs Olijars	Latvia	16.08.2005	
400 m hurdles	48.04	Rasmus Mägi	Estonia	30.07.2023	
3000 m steeplechase	8:26.26	Nikolay Matyushenko	Ukraine	21.06.1986	
High jump	2.36	Hennadiy Avdyeyenko	Ukraine	06.07.1988	
Pole vault	5.85	Grigoriy Yegorov	Kazakhstan	05.07.1988	
Long jump	8.46	Leonid Voloshin	Russia	05.07.1988	
Triple jump	17.47	Aleksandr Kovalenko	Belarus	07.07.1988	
Shot put	22.60	Ulf Timmermann	East Germany	21.06.1986	
Discus throw	70.61	Virgilijus Alekna	Lithuania	16.09.2005	
Hammer throw	86.66 (WR)	Yuriy Sedykh	Soviet Union	22.06.1986	
Javelin throw	90.73 (NR)	Vadims Vasiļevskis	Latvia	22.07.2007	
Decathlon	8628	Erki Nool	Estonia	05.07.1998	
10,000 m walk	40:43.73	Hagen Pohle	Germany	17.08.1977	
20,000 m walk	1:29:29.4	Evgeni Semerdzhiev	Bulgaria	17.08.1977	
4 × 100 m relay	38.36	A. Yevgenyev, N. Yuschmanov, V. Muravyov, V. Bryzhin	Soviet Union	21.06.1986	
4 × 400 m relay	3:03.68	V. Krylov, V. Kocerjagins, V. Prosin, A. Kurochkin	Soviet Union	22.06.1986	

==== Women ====
Event	Record	Athlete	Nationality	Date	Ref
100 m	11.08	Silke Gladisch	East Germany	21.06.1986	
200 m	22.13	Heike Drechsler	East Germany	22.06.1986	
400 m	49.76	Olga Vladykina	Ukraine	21.06.1986	
800 m	1:57.98	Sigrun Wodars	East Germany	22.06.1986	
1000 m	2:45.3	Sirje Eichelmann	Estonia	31.08.1988	
1500 m	4:02.90	Heike Oehme	East Germany	21.06.1986	
Mile	4:36.36	Liina Tšernov	Estonia	18.08.2017	
2000 m	5:56.8	Sirje Eichelmann	Estonia	07.09.1988	
3000 m	8:36.00	Tetyana Samolenko	Ukraine	22.06.1986	
5000 m	15:02.12	Svetlana Guskova	Soviet Union	21.06.1986	
10,000 m	32:18.69	Jip Vastenburg	Netherlands	10.07.2015	
100 m hurdles	12.57	Cornelia Oschkenat	East Germany	21.06.1986	
400 m hurdles	54.28	Emma Zapletalová	Slovakia	10.07.2021	
3000 m steeplechase	9:36.14	Tuğba Güvenç	Turkey	11.07.2015	
High jump	2.00	Kajsa Bergqvist	Sweden	10.07.2021	
High jump	2.00	Yaroslava Mahuchikh	Ukraine	10.07.2021	
Pole vault	4.57	Angelica Bengtsson	Sweden	23.07.2011	
Long jump	7.45 (WR)	Heike Drechsler	East Germany	21.06.1986	
Triple jump	14.64	Mabel Gay	Cuba	25.08.2009	
Shot put	22.55	Natalya Lisovskaya	Soviet Union	05.07.1988	
Discus throw	72.12	Diana Sachse	East Germany	21.06.1986	
Hammer throw	77.80 (WR)	Tatyana Lysenko	Russia	15.08.2006	
Javelin throw	67.39	Maria Abakumova	Russia	25.08.2009	
Heptathlon	6769	Carolina Klüft	Sweden	04.07.2004	
10 000 m walk	42:59.48	Elena Lashmanova	Russia	21.07.2011	
4 × 100 m relay	42.70	E. Barbashina, M. Azarashvili, I.Slyusar, O. Zolotaryova	Soviet Union	21.06.1986	
4 × 400 m relay	3:23.25	R. Ludwigs, S. Busch, A. Hesselbarth, P. Müller	East Germany	22.06.1986	
80 m hurdles	10.9	Helgi Mägi	Estonia	1968	

== See also ==
- August Komendant
- One team in Tallinn
