= Aita Põldma =

Estonian tennis player and tennis coach

Aita Põldma (until 1972 Aita Kree; born 21 January 1949) is an Estonian tennis player and tennis coach.

She was born in Tallinn. In 1971 she graduated from Tallinn Pedagogical Institute's Institute of Physical Education.

She started her tennis exercising in 1959, coached by her father Evald Kree. 1965–1978 she won several medals at Estonian Championships, including gold medal in double tennis. She was a member of Estonian national tennis team. In total he competed 47 times for the team.

Since 1982 she has been a tennis coach. Students: Maret Ani, Margit Rüütel.

Awards:

- 2019 lifetime award of European Tennis Federation
