= Tartan Army Sunshine Appeal =

Scottish charity

- Founded: 1999
- Headquarters: Glasgow, Scotland
- Website: https://www.tasunshineappeal.scot/

The Tartan Army Sunshine Appeal (TASA) is a Scottish charity that the Tartan Army – supporters of the Scotland national football team – operates.

The group also operates the Tartan Army Children's Charity (TACC). Both donate to children's causes, but what differentiates the two is that while the Children's Charity supports mainly Scottish domestic causes, the Sunshine Appeal supports children's causes in other locations where Scotland plays (both men's and women's teams and including elsewhere in the United Kingdom such as England).

== History ==
In 1999 following the Bosnian War, Tartan Army members traveled to Sarajevo for Scotland's UEFA Euro 2000 qualifying away fixture against Bosnia-Herzegovina despite the Foreign Commonwealth Office discouraging travel to the country. While there, they delivered items to war orphans and also made a donation to support the purchase of a prosthetic limb for Kemal Karic, a boy who lost part of his lower leg due to a bomb blast. The organization was formally started in 2003 for the second donation in Lithuania.

Donations also continued when matches were played behind closed doors due to the COVID-19 pandemic. For their UEFA Euro 2020 qualifying playoff final against Serbia in Belgrade, the 78th donation was presented remotely to Evo Ruka in Zemun Polje, who assist children and young people with disabilities and rare diseases. Scotland won on penalties, which qualified the men's team for their first major tournament since the 1998 FIFA World Cup in France.

== Activities ==
As of October 2021, donations totalling over $200,000 (£145,000) have been made in 88 countries. Primarily, donations are made to local children's healthcare and rehabilitation organisations. Donations are typically collected from travelling Scottish football fans and total £1,000 to £5,000.

The charity is non-religious and non-political.

== Notable donations ==
Note – The TASA official website begins tracking at the 2003 donation in Lithuania, so this adds one to the running counter to account for Bosnia in 1999.

- 1st donation: Bosnia, 1999 – prosthetic limb for Kemal Karic (Bosnia and Herzegovina 1–2 Scotland, Koševo Stadium, Sarajevo, 4 September 1999 – UEFA Euro 2000 qualifying)
- 2nd donation: Lithuania, 2003 (Lithuania 1–0 Scotland, S. Darius and S. Girėnas Stadium, Kaunas, 2 April 2003 – UEFA Euro 2004 qualifying)
- 42nd donation: United States, 2012 – Jacksonville School for Autism (United States 5–1 Scotland, EverBank Field, Jacksonville, Florida, USA, 26 May 2012)
- 50th donation, Nigeria
- Yokohama, Japan
- Moldova, playground at a neurological hospital
- Ukraine, medical care for children with impaired vision
- Croatia, incubators for premature infants
- Netherlands
- 2012 Belgium
- 64th donation 2017, Lithuania
- 2016 Malta
- 2017 Budapest, Hungary, orphanage
- 79th donation: Serbia, 2020 – Evo Ruka, assisting children and young people with disabilities and rare diseases (Serbia 5–6 Scotland, Red Star Stadium, Belgrade, 12 November 2020 – UEFA Euro 2020 qualifying playoff Path C final)
- 85th donation: England, 2021 – KEEN London, providing one-to-one support at free sports and activity sessions for children with additional needs or disabilities, including children further isolated by the COVID-19 pandemic (England 0–0 Scotland, Wembley Stadium, London, 18 June 2021 – UEFA Euro 2020 Group D)
- 87th donation, 2021 Faroe Islands
- 88th donation, 2021 Moldova

== Notable members ==
- Neil Forbes, Chairman
- John Daly, former Chairman
- Craig Couper, Steering Group
- Jennifer Blackwood
