= Tartan Army =

Fans of the Scotland national football team

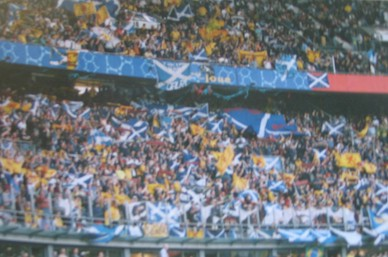
The Tartan Army at the opening match of the 1998 FIFA World Cup, a tournament at which the Scots won an award for good behaviour

The Tartan Army is the collective name for supporters of the Scotland national football team. The name, derived from tartan, a traditional symbol of Scotland, has been widely used since 1970s and refers to the travelling support that follows the national team at home and abroad. The group is known for its colourful displays, songs, large-scale tournament followings and charitable activities, and has developed a reputation as one of football's most distinctive supporter groups.

== History ==
=== Origins ===
Tartan is part of the symbolic national dress of Scotland, and the name Tartan Army first came into common usage in the 1970s, to describe the "well-refreshed hordes" who would stand on the terracings at Hampden Park, or biannually at Wembley for the England match. Scotland fans were criticised at that time for their hooliganism, particularly after they invaded the Wembley pitch and destroyed the goalposts after the 2–1 win against England in 1977.

Two years later, 349 arrests were made and a further 144 fans were ejected from Wembley Stadium during the 1979 British Home Championship match, mainly for drunk and disorderly behaviour and vandalism. The behaviour in that latter match prompted the Scottish Sports Minister Alex Fletcher to apologise to colleagues and led to the creation of the Scotland Travel Club.

=== Scotland Travel Club ===
The Scotland Travel Club was established in 1980 with the expressed purpose of encouraging responsible behaviour by fans. It has been suggested that the improvement in behaviour arose mainly from a desire to look better than the English fans, who experienced significant problems with hooliganism during the 1980s and 1990s.

The organisation of the Travel Club had an immediate impact, with the Scotland matches at the 1982 FIFA World Cup being played in a "family atmosphere". The Tartan Army were named as the best supporters during the 1992 European Championship with 5,000 travelling to Sweden. At the 1998 World Cup in France, The Tartan army again received an award for their behaviour with BBC News describing the Scotland fans as "one of the highlights" of that World Cup, noting their colourful appearance. It is estimated that 20,000 supporters travelled to the World Cups in Spain in 1982 and Italy in 1990., whilst 30,000 are estimated to have travelled to France in 1998.

Matches against England, which used to be played on an annual basis as part of the British Home Championship, were eventually stopped after 1989 due to violence and organised hooliganism. Both matches that were played between the countries in November 1999 in qualification for UEFA Euro 2000 had associated problems. Strathclyde Police made 230 arrests in connection with the tie played at Hampden, while trouble at the second leg in Wembley resulted in 56 supporter injuries and 39 arrests. Police spokesmen downplayed the incidents after both games, however. Comments after the first game indicated that the arrests were for minor public order offences and that the scale of violence witnessed was lower than a typical Friday evening in Glasgow. The Metropolitan Police adopted a "zero tolerance" approach for the second game, but the number of arrests was "comparatively small" and the "vast majority" of supporters were well behaved.

=== 21st century ===
The Tartan Army were awarded a Fair Play prize by the Belgian Olympic Committee after a 2002 FIFA World Cup qualifier in Brussels. The fans had been praised by the mayor of Zagreb for their behaviour after a match against Croatia in the same competition. In April 2002, during the joint bid by Scotland and Ireland to host the UEFA Euro 2008 tournament, First Minister of Scotland Jack McConnell cited the "worldwide reputation" of the Tartan Army as a strength of the bid, stating that other countries welcome their arrival "with open arms".

==== Scotland Supporters Club ====
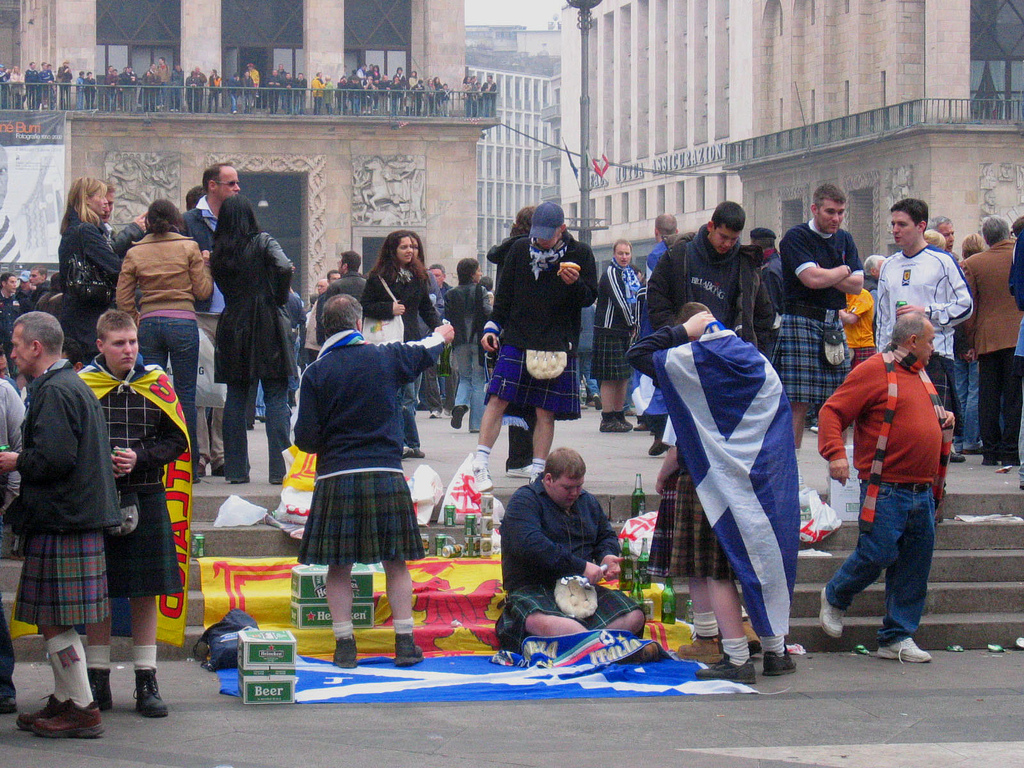
The Tartan Army in Milan, Italy

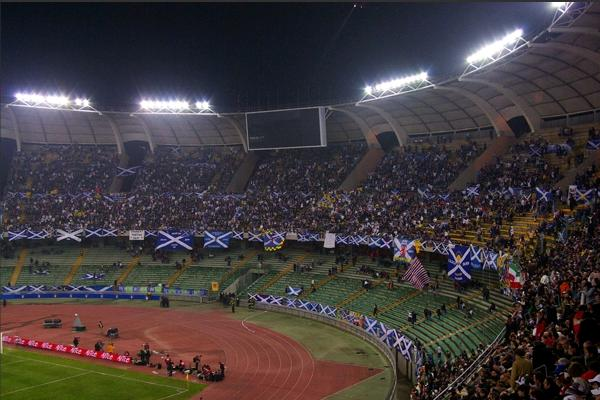
Scotland fans at the Stadio San Nicola in Bari for a UEFA Euro 2008 qualifying match against Italy.

In 2005, the Scotland Travel Club became the Scotland Supporters Club, with sections for younger fans being established. Membership had grown to 17,000 by this time. The UEFA Euro 2008 qualifying campaign saw membership numbers increase dramatically to a capacity of 27,500, with a waiting list of over 10,000.

In 2007, an estimated 15,000 Tartan Army supporters travelled to Paris, marching through the city before Scotland's famous 1–0 victory over France at the Parc des Princes in UEFA Euro 2008 qualifying. The Scotland Supporters Club is operated by the Scottish Football Association, with membership guaranteeing one match ticket for all home fixtures and offering the opportunity to apply for away match tickets. As of August 2010, the club was at its maximum capacity of 35,000 members and did not accept new applications.

In August 2008, Irish Football Association chief executive Howard Wells criticised jeering from Scottish supporters during the British National Anthem, "God Save the Queen", before a friendly international match against Northern Ireland. The SFA, who had pleaded with fans not to jeer the anthem, admitted that they were also "disappointed" by the booing. The Scottish Government also criticised the Tartan Army, commenting that it had "tarnished" their reputation. Scotland were not punished for the booing because the match was a friendly, which fell outside the jurisdiction of UEFA. The British anthem was used by Scotland until the 1970s, but it was replaced by "Scotland the Brave" and subsequently "Flower of Scotland", due to consistent booing at matches. This issue recurred when Scotland played Liechtenstein in September 2010, as their national anthem uses the same tune as the British anthem. SFA acting chief executive George Peat publicly apologised for a section of the fans jeering the anthem. The British anthem was again booed by Scotland fans when the team played Northern Ireland in the 2011 Nations Cup, and England in a September 2023 friendly.

The Tartan Army has been a consistent opponent of the concept of a Great Britain team, particularly its participation in the 2012 Olympic Games, due to concerns that such participation would endanger the separate status of Scotland within international football.

In 2013, an estimated 25,000 Tartan Army supporters travelled to London for Scotland's first match against England at Wembley in 14 years. Fans gathered in Trafalgar Square, notably filling the fountains with washing up liquid. Similar scenes were seen again in London during Scotland's 2018 FIFA World Cup qualification match against England.

==== UEFA Euro 2020 and 2024 ====
Scotland qualified for UEFA Euro 2020, their first major finals since the 1998 World Cup. The tournament was spread around Europe, meaning that two of three group stage games were played at Hampden Park, but over 20,000 Scotland fans travelled to London for the game against England. This was despite Scotland only being allocated 2,600 tickets, due to COVID-19 restrictions.

During UEFA Euro 2024, the Tartan Army attracted praise for the scale and atmosphere of its support across Germany. Up to 200,000 supporters were estimated to travel to the tournament, many without match tickets. Euro 2024 was particularly significant for a generation of supporters who had grown up without experiencing Scotland at a major tournament abroad. Ahead of Scotland's opening match against hosts Germany in Munich, supporters filled Marienplatz with kilts, flags, songs and bagpipes, with chants of "No Scotland, No Party" and "Yes Sir, I Can Boogie" becoming a familiar soundtrack. Similar scenes followed in Cologne, where an estimated 30,000 joined a fan march to the stadium from before Scotland's match against Switzerland, and in Stuttgart for the final group match against Hungary. The city of Cologne went as far as to set up its own Tartan Army faction after the tournament. Despite Scotland's early elimination, the Tartan Army received widespread recognition for its passion, behaviour and positive impact on host communities. VisitScotland data later highlighted a tourism boost from Germany in 2024, with Germany becoming Scotland’s second-largest overseas market after the United States,, while an RTL poll named the Tartan Army the tournament’s best supporters with more than half of the vote.

==== 2026 World Cup ====
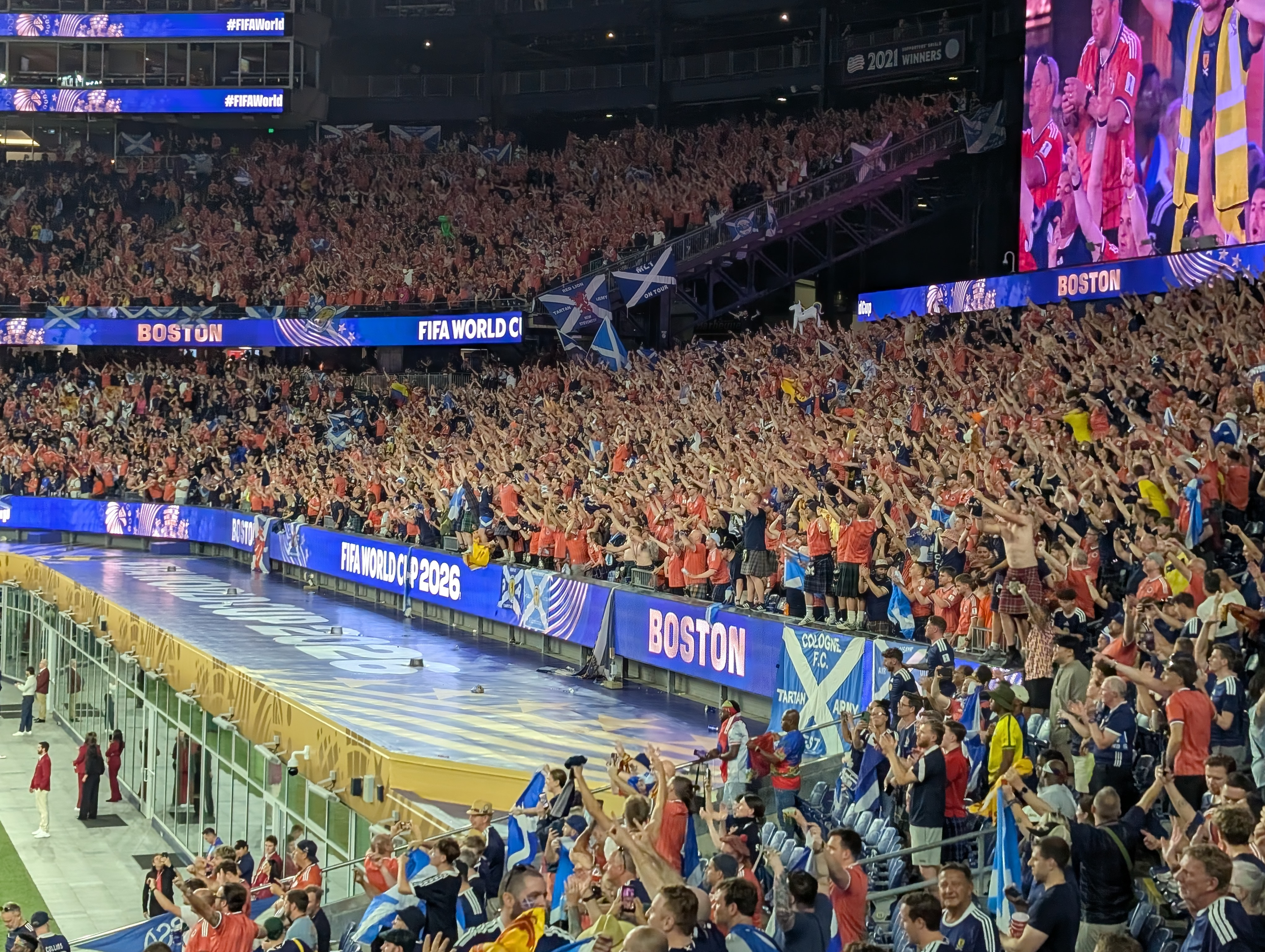
The Tartan Army celebrate Scotland's victory over Haiti in their opening match at Gillette Stadium in Foxborough during the 2026 FIFA World Cup. The win was Scotland's first at a World Cup since defeating Sweden in 1990.

During the 2026 FIFA World Cup in the United States, Canada and Mexico—the Scotland men's national team's first World Cup appearance since 1998—the Tartan Army became a prominent feature of the Boston area, where Scotland played its opening two group-stage matches. Despite the high costs of travel and ticket prices, an estimated 50,000 Scotland supporters visited the region during the tournament. Reports highlighted bagpipe-led marches, the placing of traffic cones on statues, boat parties in Boston Harbor, street celebrations and viral social media videos featuring supporters alongside local residents, businesses and police officers. Several flights carrying Scotland supporters reportedly exhausted their onboard beer supplies before arriving in the United States.

The vast majority of the 64,146 spectators at Scotland's opening match against Haiti were Scottish supporters, in what was reported to be one of the largest overseas gatherings of the Tartan Army on record. During the singing of "Flower of Scotland" before kick-off, a sound level of 125 decibels was recorded at Gillette Stadium, the highest ever measured at a World Cup match at the time. The next day, the Boston Red Sox hosted a Scottish Celebration Night against the Texas Rangers at Fenway Park. An estimated 5,000 supporters marched through Boston to the stadium behind a procession of bagpipers. The Red Sox marked the occasion with Scotland-themed festivities, including special jerseys inspired by Scotland's national team kit, team mascot Wally the Green Monster wearing a kilt and Scottish music performed by the stadium organist. Players, coaches and commentators praised the atmosphere, with some comparing it to that of a Major League Baseball postseason game.

The influx of supporters generated significant economic activity for Boston and neighbouring communities. Bars, restaurants and hotels reported record levels of business, with the Samuel Adams Boston Taproom stating that supporters consumed four times the volume of Boston Lager typically sold during a major holiday weekend. Other establishments reported sales exceeding levels normally associated with events such as the Super Bowl and St Patrick's Day, while Scottish and Irish-themed venues across New England became focal points for supporters during the tournament. Several bars, pubs and liquor stores temporarily ran out of beer as demand exceeded expectations. The Tartan Army also received praise from residents, businesses, city officials and law enforcement for its conduct and community spirit. Supporters were commended for cleaning public areas after celebrations and for fostering positive relations with local communities, with local media describing them as having won over Bostonians. The Tartan Army's reputation received wider recognition, with outlets including Sports Illustrated and SB Nation highlighting the supporters as one of the standout fan groups of the tournament. Following Scotland's two group matches in Boston, the city's largest newspaper, The Boston Globe, published a full-page tribute to the Tartan Army, thanking supporters for the atmosphere they brought to the city and describing their visit as "something we'll be talking about for years".

The cultural impact of the visit extended beyond football. During the tournament, Boston Mayor Michelle Wu announced a sister-city partnership between Boston and Glasgow, citing the strong connections formed during the World Cup. Massachusetts Governor Maura Healey also signed a non-binding, symbolic executive order legalising haggis in the state and proclaimed 18 June, the day of Scotland's match against Morocco, as "World Cup Fan Appreciation Day" in recognition of the influx of international supporters to Massachusetts, particularly members of the Tartan Army. Following the World Cup, the "No Boston, No Party" traffic cone was officially welcomed by Boston and Massachusetts officials, with the Scottish flag added to the Hall of Flags at Logan International Airport to commemorate the relationship strengthened between Boston and Scotland during the tournament. The cone, featuring motifs representing both Boston and Glasgow, subsequently toured Massachusetts to raise funds for mental health charities in Scotland and the United States.

The influence of the Tartan Army extended into neighbouring Rhode Island, where thousands of supporters stayed in Providence. The Providence Tartan Army initiative helped coordinate accommodation, transport and events for visiting fans, including the chartering of yellow school buses for travel to matches in Foxborough and boat parties on Providence River. Through merchandise sales, transport fundraising and donations, the initiative raised more than $23,000 for charitable causes in both Scotland and the United States, including the Hasbro Children's Hospital. Following the tournament, Providence civic organisations and local businesses donated more than $10,500 to Glasgow Children's Hospital Charity as a gesture of "gratitude and friendship" after the Tartan Army's stay in the city. Rhode Island Monthly named the Providence Tartan Army the "Best Fans" in its annual Best of Rhode Island awards. A smaller Scottish contingent was also present in New York City, where supporters attended New York Yankees games at Yankee Stadium and organised boat parties on the Hudson River.

Ahead of Scotland's final group match against Brazil in Miami, approximately 8,000 Scottish supporters attended a baseball game between the Miami Marlins and Texas Rangers at loanDepot Park, where Billy Gilmour threw the ceremonial first pitch. The supporters gathered in Miami's Little Havana neighborhood before marching to the stadium.

== Composition ==
Research carried out by the University of Edinburgh in 2002 noted that the proportion of the Tartan Army comprising Rangers supporters, traditionally regarded as the backbone of the Scotland support, had declined since the 1980s, although Rangers still provided the largest single group of supporters at 21%. Old Firm supporters (Rangers and Celtic combined) accounted for 38% of the Scotland support, a lower proportion than their share of Scottish club football attendances. Smaller clubs were disproportionately represented, while Aberdeen supporters were particularly prominent, accounting for 13% of those surveyed. The study also found that 73% of supporters were aged between 15 and 34, 95% were male, and support was drawn from a broad range of occupational backgrounds. Politically, the Scottish National Party enjoyed the support of almost two in five Tartan Army members, while Labour was supported by around a third.

More recent figures from the Scottish Football Association’s Supporter Club membership data, published in 2019, continued to show Rangers as the largest represented club among Scotland supporters. Rangers were followed by Aberdeen, Celtic, Hearts and Hibernian, with supporters of several smaller clubs also represented.

== Charitable work ==
The Tartan Army received a nomination in the inaugural International Scot Award, as part of The Herald newspaper's Scottish Politician of the Year ceremony, for their charitable work. The Tartan Army Children's Charity (TACC) and Tartan Army Sunshine Appeal (TASA) are both registered Scottish charities run by Scotland fans, raising money for disadvantaged children in Scotland and in the countries visited by fans following the team.

The Sunshine Appeal was first launched after Scotland's away fixture against Bosnia-Herzegovina in Sarajevo in September 1999 during UEFA Euro 2000 qualifying, when a group of Scotland fans, who had traveled despite the Foreign Commonwealth Office discouraging travel in the wake of the Bosnian War, were introduced to Kemal Karic, a local boy who had lost his leg in the shelling of Sarajevo. TASA's aim is to make a donation in every country where Scotland play a game, which they have done since 2003.

TACC has donated funds to projects for disabled and blind children in Ukraine, Georgia and North Macedonia. In 2009, £30,000 was donated to each of two projects in South Africa, where the Tartan Army had hoped to visit for the 2010 FIFA World Cup. The TACC, which is the nominated charity of the SFA, also organise trips for disadvantaged Scottish children to watch Scotland play at Hampden Park. TACC's main fundraising events are a monthly lottery and the TACC Kiltwalk, an annual 26-mile sponsored walk from Hampden Park to Loch Lomond.

In 2024, Paisley waiter Craig Ferguson completed a 1,000-mile walk from Glasgow to Munich ahead of UEFA Euro 2024, raising more than £70,000 for Scottish Action for Mental Health (SAMH). In 2026, Ferguson completed a 3,500-mile walk from Los Angeles to Boston, raising over £1 million for SAMH. He finished at the Soldiers and Sailors Monument on Boston Common, where hundreds of supporters gathered on the eve of Scotland's opening group-stage match against Haiti at Boston Stadium during the 2026 FIFA World Cup.

== Music ==
In 2007, the Tartan Army joined Scottish folk-rock band Runrig to record a version of Loch Lomond, christened the Hampden Remix, for BBC Children in Need. The song peaked at #9 on the UK Singles Chart and at #1 in Scotland. in April 2022, their recording was certified silver by the British Phonographic Industry (BPI) for sales and streams exceeding 200,000 units.

== Official tartan ==
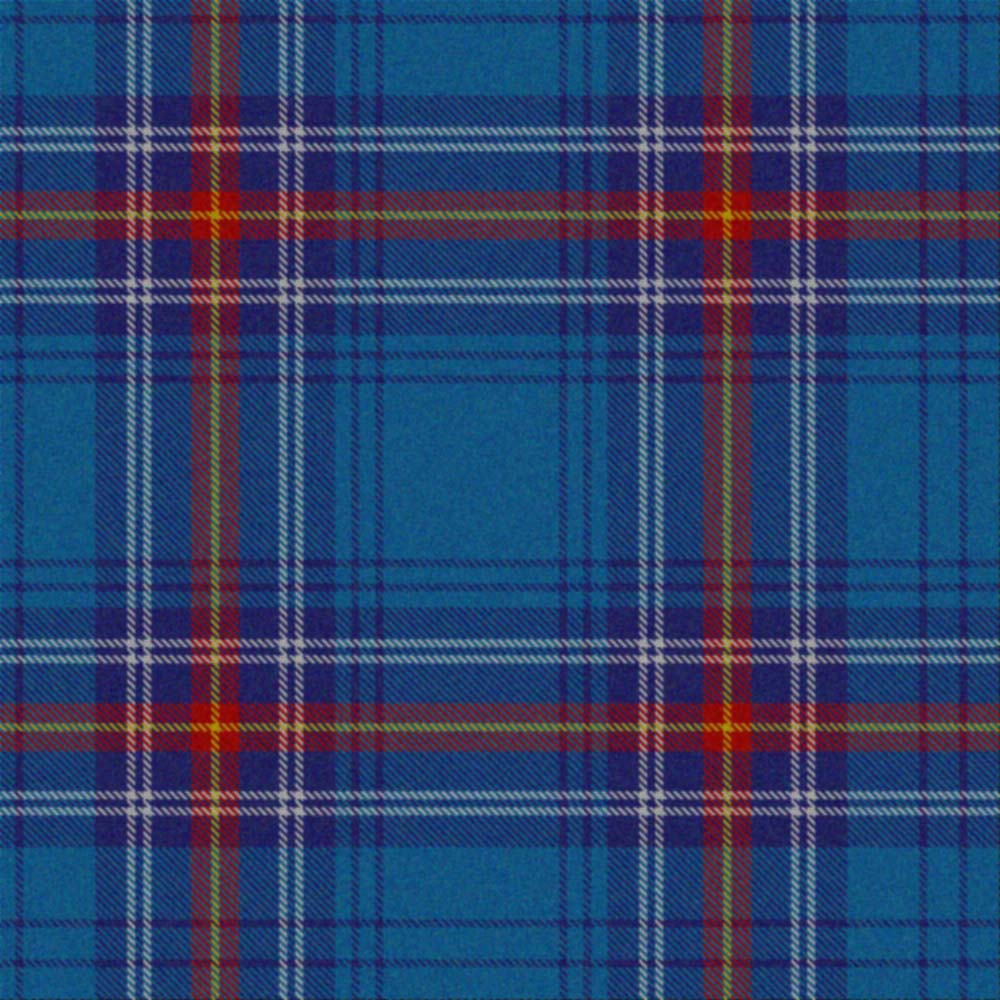
The Tartan Army tartan

Prior to the 1998 FIFA World Cup, Ian and Alan Adie, two Glasgow businessmen, trademarked the name "Tartan Army" in 1997. They approached the Scottish Tartans Authority to assist in creating a tartan. Keith Lumsden designed the corporate tartan on their behalf and it was registered on 1 March 1997 under number 2389 with both the Scottish Tartans Authority (STA) and the Scottish Tartans World Register (STWR).

It is mostly Balmoral Blue and Torea Bay , with Freedom Red , Gainsboro White , and Golden Poppy .

The Scottish Tartans Society notes that the design was taken originally from Royal Stewart and modified having Black Watch added as a background. It was first seen in common use at the 1998 FIFA World Cup.

== Away with the Tartan Army – Scotland's Best Moments ==
In June 2021, the BBC produced a documentary hosted by Off the Ball's Stuart Cosgrove and Tam Cowan counting down the top 10 great Scotland supporting memories ranked by a group of journalists, pundits and former players and including interviews with Tartan Army members.

1. Ally's Tartan Army – 1978 FIFA World Cup in Argentina
2. Turf And Goalposts – 1977 British Home Championship vs. England at Wembley, which included the pitch invasion
3. We'll Always Have Paris – UEFA Euro 2008 qualifying vs. France at the Parc des Princes, remembered for James McFadden's long-range winner
4. The Greatest Show on Earth – Opening the 1998 FIFA World Cup vs. Brazil at the Stade de France
5. Six Minutes of Insanity – 2018 FIFA World Cup qualifying vs. England at Hampden Park ending with late goals from Leigh Griffiths twice from free kicks and Harry Kane
6. Ciao Bella – 1990 FIFA World Cup in Italy
7. An Army of Peace – UEFA Euro 2000 qualifying vs. Bosnia-Herzegovina in Sarajevo, which led to the creation of TASA and TACC after the Tartan Army collected donations for those affected by the Bosnian War
8. The Swedest Thing – UEFA Euro 1992, where the Tartan Army were named as the best group of supporters
9. One team in Tallinn – 1998 FIFA World Cup qualifying vs. Estonia, which was abandoned after three seconds after Estonia did not appear for the match but included an impromptu match between the Tartan Army and Estonian security guards, which the Tartan Army claims to have won 1-0
10. We'll Be Coming Down The Road – UEFA Euro 1996 vs. England at Wembley including Paul Gascoigne's famous goal

As a finale, the programme included reactions to Scotland's victory on penalties against Serbia in Belgrade to qualify for UEFA Euro 2020, their first major tournament since 1998, which was played behind closed doors due to the COVID-19 (Coronavirus) pandemic.

== See also ==
- Ally's Tartan Army
- Football in Scotland
- Tartan Army Sunshine Appeal
