= No Scotland, No Party =

Unofficial anthem of the Scotland men's national football team

Song by Nick Morgan
- Released: 17 May 2024
- Recorded: 2024
- Composer: Rodrigo Bueno
- Lyricist: Nick Morgan

"No Scotland, No Party" is a song and unofficial anthem released by Scottish musician Nick Morgan to mark the Scottish football team's qualification for the UEFA 2024 European Championships in Germany.

== Overview ==
Nick Morgan, a former postman from Prestwick in Scotland, had the idea after watching videos paying tribute to the football icon, Diego Maradona, after he died in 2020.

The tune was based on an Argentinian song by the late singer Rodrigo Bueno called La Mano de Dios or The Hand of God (released in 2001) which referenced Maradona's infamous 'Hand of God' handball goal for Argentina against England in the 1986 World Cup.

'No Scotland, No Party' reworks the tune and Morgan's 2024 lyrics chart "Scotland's historic successes and losses at major tournaments over the years" and paying homage to Argentina as a side that have been world champions.

Morgan explained to BBC Scotland that:

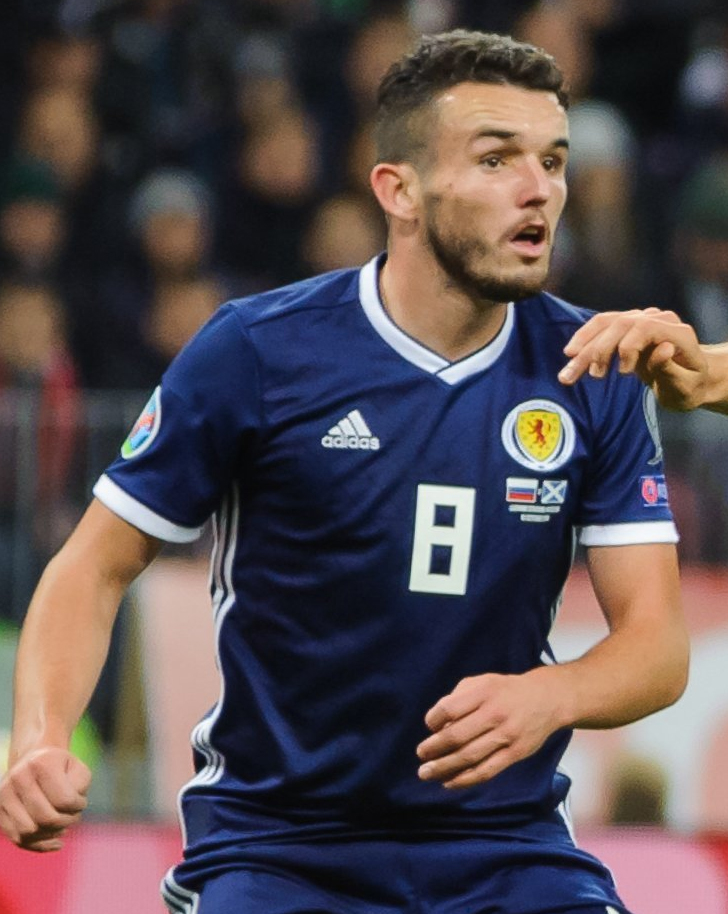
[Chorus] "We've got John McGinn (John McGinn, John McGinn)"

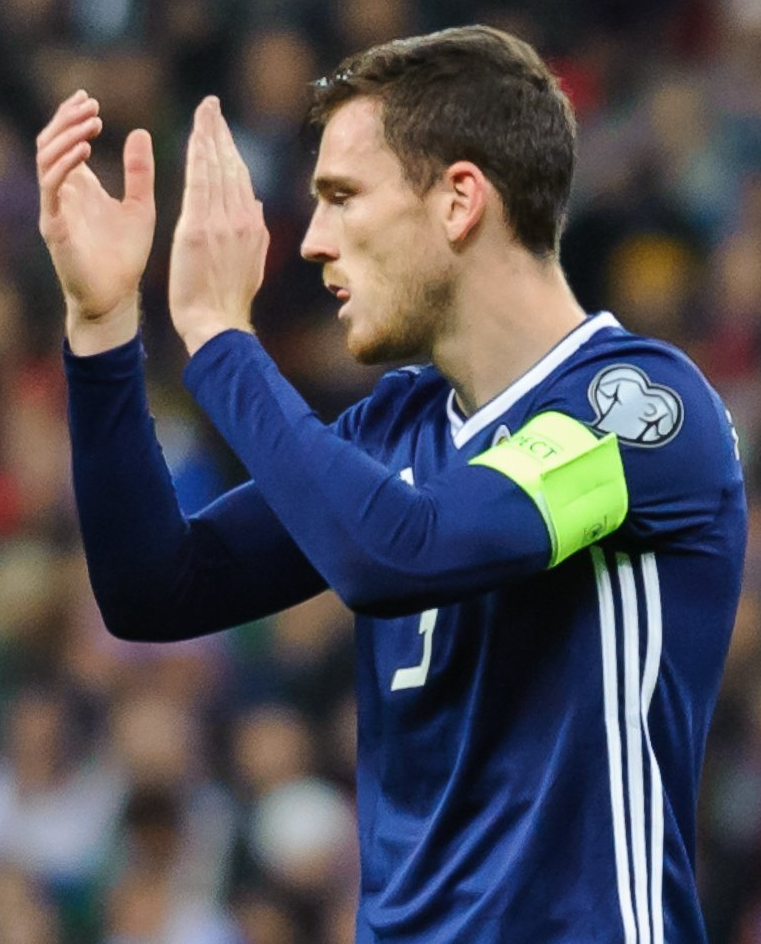
"And Robbo out on the wing (on the wing, on the wing)"

"The theme of the song is essentially: we know we are not this great team, we know we are not Argentina, we are not world champions, but we have these great players and we have this belief."

The chorus of the song - "but we’ve got John McGinn and Robbo out on the wing" - alludes to two of Scotland's best players, John McGinn and Andy Robertson.

== Reaction ==
The song has been a viral hit with over four million views on TikTok and has received airplay and news coverage on Argentinian TV and radio stations since it was released.

The Tartan Army (fans of the Scotland football team) adopted it as their unofficial anthem at Euro 2024.

== Charts ==
Chart performance for "No Scotland No Party"
Chart (2026)	Peak position
UK Singles (OCC)	74
UK Indie (OCC)	16
