= Miroslav Radoman =

Serbian football referee and player

Personal information
- Date of birth: 28 February 1958 (age 68)
- Place of birth: Brčko, FPR Yugoslavia
- Position: Goalkeeper

Youth career
- Njegoš Lovćenac

Senior career*
Years	Team	Apps	(Gls)
1978–1990	Vrbas	199	(0)
Total		199	(0)
Refereeing career
Domestic
Years	League	Role
1992–2004	First League of FR Yugoslavia/ Serbia and Montenegro	Referee
International
Years	League	Role
1996–2004	FIFA listed	Referee
- * Club domestic league appearances and goals

Miroslav Radoman (Serbian Cyrillic: Мирослав Радоман; born 28 February 1958) is a Serbian former football referee and player.

== Playing career ==
After starting out at Njegoš Lovćenac, Radoman played for Vrbas between 1978 and 1990, including six seasons in the Yugoslav Second League.

== Refereeing career ==
Radoman started his refereeing career locally in 1984, while still playing for Vrbas. He later officiated in the First League of FR Yugoslavia/Serbia and Montenegro from 1992 to 2004, becoming one of the country's most accomplished referees. Radoman also refereed the FR Yugoslavia/Serbia and Montenegro Cup finals on several occasions, with his last appointment being in 2004, shortly before his retirement.
