= Maret Ani =

Estonian tennis player (born 1982)

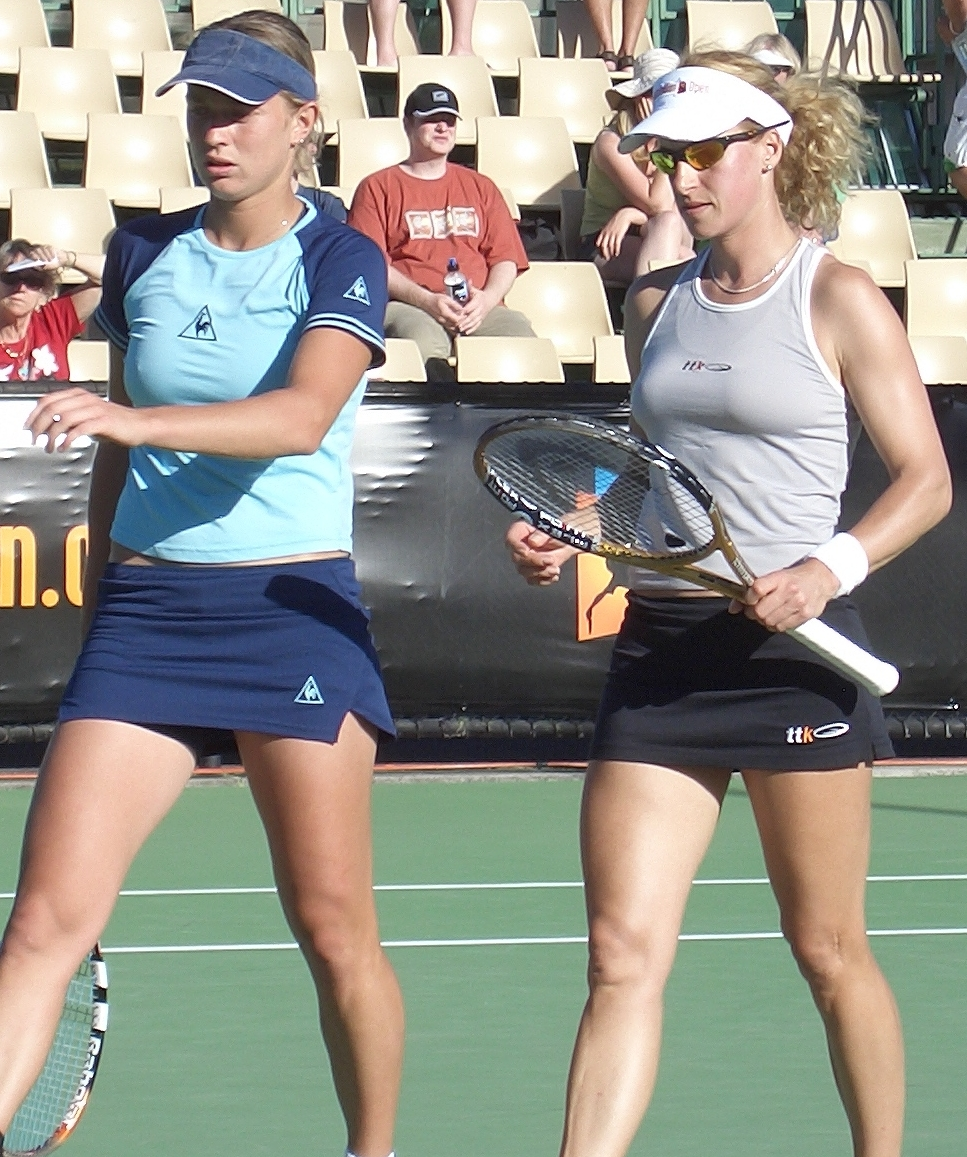
- Ani (left) with doubles partner Andreea Vanc
- Country (sports): Estonia
- Residence: Rakvere, Estonia
- Born: 31 January 1982 (age 44) Tallinn, then part of Estonian SSR, Soviet Union
- Height: 1.75 m (5 ft 9 in)
- Turned pro: 1997
- Retired: 2011
- Plays: Right (two-handed backhand)
- Prize money: $733,979

Singles
- Career record: 335–263
- Career titles: 7 ITF
- Highest ranking: No. 63 (15 May 2006)

Grand Slam singles results
- Australian Open: 1R (2006, 2008)
- French Open: 1R (2006, 2009)
- Wimbledon: 1R (2006, 2008)
- US Open: 1R (2002, 2006, 2008)

Other tournaments
- Olympic Games: 1R (2008)

Doubles
- Career record: 197–144
- Career titles: 17 ITF
- Highest ranking: No. 39 (5 April 2004)

Grand Slam doubles results
- Australian Open: SF (2004)
- French Open: 3R (2006)
- Wimbledon: 2R (2006)
- US Open: 3R (2006)

Other doubles tournaments
- Olympic Games: 1R (2004, 2008)

Team competitions
- Fed Cup: 43–25

Maret Ani (born 31 January 1982) is a retired tennis player from Estonia.

At the start of 2006, she was the top-ranked player in Estonia, before losing that spot to Kaia Kanepi.

Ani was a junior basketball champion, but devoted herself to tennis from the age of 14. She moved to Italy three years later, after finding sponsorship for coaching. She was coached initially by Aita Põldma and later by Pierfrancesco Restelli.

Ani first played for the Estonia Fed Cup team in 1998.

== WTA Tour finals ==
=== Doubles: 2 runner-ups ===
Legend
Tier I
Tier II
Tier III
Tier IV & V

Result	Date	Tournament	Surface	Partner	Opponents	Score
Loss	Apr 2003	Estoril, Portugal	Clay	(Switzerland) Emmanuelle Gagliardi	(Hungary) Petra Mandula (Austria) Patricia Wartusch	7–6^{(7–3)}, 6–7^{(3–7)}, 2–6
Loss	Aug 2003	Sopot, Poland	Clay	(Czech Republic) Libuše Průšová	(Ukraine) Tatiana Perebiynis (Croatia) Silvija Talaja	4–6, 5–7

== ITF Circuit finals ==
$100,000 tournaments
$75,000 tournaments
$50,000 tournaments
$25,000 tournaments
$10,000 tournaments

=== Singles (7–14) ===
Result	No.	Date	Tournament	Surface	Opponent	Score
Loss	1.	Nov 1998	Rungsted, Denmark	Hard (i)	(Denmark) Eva Dyrberg	3–6, 4–6
Loss	2.	Jul 2000	Camaiore, Italy	Clay	(Argentina) Eugenia Chialvo	1–6, 6–2, 5–7
Loss	3.	Aug 2000	Rimini, Italy	Clay	(Hungary) Zsófia Gubacsi	2–6, 2–6
Loss	4.	Sep 2000	Spoleto, Italy	Clay	(Italy) Maria Elena Camerin	2–6, 6–7^{(0)}
Loss	5.	Oct 2000	Fiumicino, Italy	Clay	(Romania) Andreea Vanc	1–4, 1–4, 5–3, 1–4
Loss	6.	Oct 2000	Saint-Raphaël, France	Hard	(Germany) Mia Buric	2–4, 4–1, 4–2, 3–5, 3–5
Loss	7.	Oct 2003	Saint Raphael, France	Hard (i)	(France) Camille Pin	2–6, 2–6
Loss	8.	Apr 2005	Civitavecchia, Italy	Clay	(Romania) Magda Mihalache	6–1, 5–7, 4–6
Loss	9.	Aug 2005	Martina Franca, Italy	Clay	(Italy) Nathalie Viérin	3–6, 4–6
Win	10.	Oct 2005	Saint Raphael, France	Hard (i)	(Italy) Mara Santangelo	6–3, 7–5
Loss	11.	Nov 2005	Poitiers, France	Hard	(Ukraine) Viktoria Kutuzova	3–6, 6–3, 4–6
Win	12.	Jan 2007	Capriolo, Italy	Carpet (i)	(Germany) Carmen Klaschka	2–6, 6–1, 6–1
Loss	13.	Feb 2007	London, Great Britain	Hard	(Netherlands) Elise Tamaëla	2–6, 7–6^{(4)}, 6–7^{(3)}
Win	14.	Feb 2007	Tipton, Great Britain	Hard	(Netherlands) Elise Tamaëla	5–7, 7–6^{(3)}, 7–5
Loss	15.	Mar 2007	Patras, Greece	Hard	(Bosnia and Herzegovina) Mervana Jugić-Salkić	5–4 ret.
Win	16.	Apr 2007	Putignano, Italy	Carpet (i)	(Germany) Carmen Klaschka	7–6^{(8)}, 6–4
Loss	17.	Sep 2007	Albuquerque, United States	Hard	(Paraguay) Rossana de los Ríos	6–7^{(6)}, 6–1, 2–6
Win	18.	Oct 2007	Troy, United States	Hard	(Canada) Stéphanie Dubois	3–6, 6–4, 6–2
Loss	19.	May 2008	Cagnes-sur-Mer, France	Clay	(Ukraine) Viktoriya Kutuzova	1–6, 5–7
Loss	20.	Sep 2008	Shrewsbury, Great Britain	Hard (i)	(Italy) Roberta Vinci	5–7, 5–7
Win	21.	Nov 2009	Istanbul, Turkey	Hard (i)	(Sweden) Johanna Larsson	7–5, 6–7^{(5)}, 6–2

=== Doubles (17–15) ===
Result	No.	Date	Tournament	Surface	Partner	Opponents	Score
Loss	1.	21 June 1998	Tallinn, Estonia	Hard	(Estonia) Helen Laupa	(Czech Republic) Helena Fremuthová (Russia) Irina Kornienko	3–6, 2–6
Win	2.	13 August 2000	Rimini, Italy	Hard	(Estonia) Margit Rüütel	(Hungary) Zsófia Gubacsi (Austria) Nicole Remis	3–6, 6–3, 7–5
Loss	3.	19 November 2000	Naples, United States	Clay	(Italy) Valentina Sassi	(Japan) Nana Miyagi (Ukraine) Elena Tatarkova	3–5, 4–2, 4–2, 3–5, 1–4
Loss	4.	5 August 2001	Alghero, Italy	Hard	(Brazil) Joana Cortez	(Australia) Trudi Musgrave (United Kingdom) Julie Pullin	4–6, 5–7
Win	5.	16 September 2001	Reggio Calabria, Italy	Clay	(Italy) Gloria Pizzichini	(Argentina) Eugenia Chialvo (Spain) Gisela Riera	w/o
Win	6.	30 September 2001	Verona, Italy	Clay	(Czech Republic) Michaela Paštiková	(Spain) Lourdes Domínguez Lino (Spain) Conchita Martínez Granados	6–7^{(4)}, 6–4, 7–6^{(5)}
Loss	7.	12 February 2002	Sutton, Great Britain	Carpet	(Russia) Galina Fokina	(Austria) Sylvia Plischke (Serbia and Montenegro) Dragana Zarić	5–7, 3–6
Win	8.	7 July 2002	Orbetello, Italy	Clay	(Romania) Andreea Vanc	(Russia) Evgenia Kulikovskaya (Russia) Ekaterina Sysoeva	6–3, 1–6, 6–1
Win	9.	18 August 2002	Bronx, United States	Hard	(Italy) Flavia Pennetta	(Japan) Shinobu Asagoe (Japan) Nana Miyagi	6–4, 6–1
Win	10.	14 September 2003	Bordeaux, France	Clay	(Czech Republic) Libuše Průšová	(Czech Republic) Iveta Benešová (Czech Republic) Olga Vymetálková	6–3, 6–4
Win	11.	5 October 2003	Caserta, Italy	Clay	(Italy) Giulia Casoni	(Spain) Rosa María Andrés Rodríguez (Morocco) Bahia Mouhtassine	7–5, 7–5
Loss	12.	12 October 2003	Latina, Italy	Clay	(Czech Republic) Libuše Průšová	(Italy) Mara Santangelo (Italy) Roberta Vinci	6–3, 2–6, 4–6
Loss	13.	26 October 2003	Saint Raphaël, France	Hard (i)	(France) Camille Pin	(Bosnia and Herzegovina) Mervana Jugić-Salkić (Croatia) Darija Jurak	2–6, 1–6
Loss	14.	21 December 2003	Valašské Meziříčí, Czech Republic	Hard (i)	(Czech Republic) Libuše Průšová	(Czech Republic) Iveta Benešová (Czech Republic) Michaela Paštiková	w/o
Loss	15.	26 September 2005	Biella, Italy	Clay	(Bosnia and Herzegovina) Mervana Jugić-Salkić	(Czech Republic) Lucie Hradecká (Czech Republic) Renata Voráčová	4–6, 6–7^{(4)}
Loss	16.	21 November 2005	Poitiers, France	Hard	(Bosnia and Herzegovina) Mervana Jugić-Salkić	(Russia) Nina Bratchikova (Uzbekistan) Akgul Amanmuradova	7–6^{(0)}, 6–1
Loss	17.	4 March 2007	Las Vegas, United States	Hard	(Italy) Alberta Brianti	(Belarus) Victoria Azarenka (Belarus) Tatiana Poutchek	2–6, 4–6
Loss	18.	7 May 2007	Rome, Italy	Clay	(Belgium) Caroline Maes	(Poland) Marta Domachowska (Finland) Emma Laine	1–0 ret.
Loss	19.	30 June 2007	Padua, Italy	Clay	(New Zealand) Marina Erakovic	(Germany) Vanessa Henke (Germany) Andrea Petkovic	6–4, 6–4
Loss	20.	9 July 2007	Biella, Italy	Clay	(Estonia) Kaia Kanepi	(Bosnia and Herzegovina) Mervana Jugić-Salkić (Czech Republic) Renata Voráčová	6–4, 6–1
Loss	21.	30 July 2007	Rimini, Italy	Clay	(Slovenia) Andreja Klepač	(Serbia) Karolina Jovanović (Bosnia and Herzegovina) Mervana Jugić-Salkić	6–4, 6–0
Loss	22.	24 September 2007	Ashland, United States	Hard	(Germany) Sandra Klösel	(Brazil) Maria Fernanda Alves (Czech Republic) Eva Hrdinová	6–7^{(5)}, 2–6
Loss	23.	9 July 2008	Cuneo, Italy	Clay	(Czech Republic) Renata Voráčová	(Ukraine) Olga Savchuk (Russia) Marina Shamayko	6–1, 6–2
Loss	24.	13 July 2008	Zagreb, Croatia	Clay	(Croatia) Jelena Kostanić Tošić	(Ukraine) Yuliya Beygelzimer (Switzerland) Stefanie Vögele	6–4, 6–2
Loss	25.	7 September 2008	Denain, France	Clay	(Spain) Lourdes Domínguez Lino	(France) Stéphanie Cohen-Aloro (Canada) Marie-Ève Pelletier	6–0, 7–5
Loss	26.	21 September 2008	Sofia, Bulgaria	Clay	(Czech Republic) Renata Voráčová	(Spain) Lourdes Domínguez Lino (Spain) Arantxa Parra Santonja	7–6^{(4)}, 7–6^{(9)}
Loss	27.	19 October 2008	Ortisei, Italy	Carpet (i)	(Kazakhstan) Galina Voskoboeva	(Ukraine) Mariya Koryttseva (Kazakhstan) Yaroslava Shvedova	2–6, 1–6
Loss	28.	29 March 2010	Minsk, Belarus	Hard	(Russia) Vitalia Diatchenko	(Russia) Elena Bovina (France) Irena Pavlovic	0–6, 1–6
Win	29.	25 March 2010	Jersey, Great Britain	Hard (i)	(United Kingdom) Anna Smith	(Australia) Jarmila Gajdošová (United Kingdom) Melanie South	7–5, 6–4
Loss	30.	9 April 2010	Civitavecchia, Italy	Clay	(Ukraine) Irina Buryachok	(Belarus) Darya Kustova (Czech Republic) Renata Voráčová	5–7, 5–7
Win	31.	7 May 2010	Florence, Italy	Clay	(Germany) Julia Schruff	(China) Lu Jingjing (Belarus) Polina Pekhova	6–3, 6–4
Loss	32.	24 January 2011	Tallinn, Estonia	Hard (i)	(Estonia) Anett Kontaveit	(Serbia) Tamara Čurović (Ukraine) Yevgeniya Kryvoruchko	6–7^{(8)}, 1–6
