= Janek Meet =

Estonian footballer

Personal information
- Full name: Janek Meet
- Date of birth: 2 May 1974 (age 52)
- Place of birth: Viljandi, then part of Estonian SSR, Soviet Union
- Height: 1.72 m (5 ft 8 in)
- Position: Left back

Senior career*
Years	Team	Apps	(Gls)
1992	JK Viljandi Tulevik	22	(0)
1994	FC Norma	5	(0)
1995	JK Tervis Pärnu	18	(0)
1996–1999	FC Flora Tallinn	55	(0)
2000–2002	JK Viljandi Tulevik	62	(2)
2003–2008	FC Kuressaare	60	(3)
2009–2015	Saaremaa JK aameraaS		

International career^{‡}
1995–2000	Estonia	37	(0)
- Saaremaa
- * Club domestic league appearances and goals as of 19 December 2007 ‡ National team caps and goals as of 19 December 2007

Janek Meet (born 2 May 1974 in Viljandi) is a retired Estonian footballer, who played in the Meistriliiga, for FC Kuressaare, whom he joined from JK Viljandi Tulevik after the 2002 season. He played the position of defender.

== International career ==
He made a total of 37 appearances for the Estonia national football team. He made his international debut in 1995.
