= Talvi Märja =

Estonian psychologist and politician

Talvi Märja (née Talvi Väli; born 8 September 1935 in Tallinn) is an Estonian tennis player, coach, andragogue, psychologist and politician. She was a member of VIII Riigikogu.
