= Bol, Croatia =

Municipality in Split-Dalmatia County, Croatia

Bol
- Municipality
- Općina Bol; Municipality of Bol
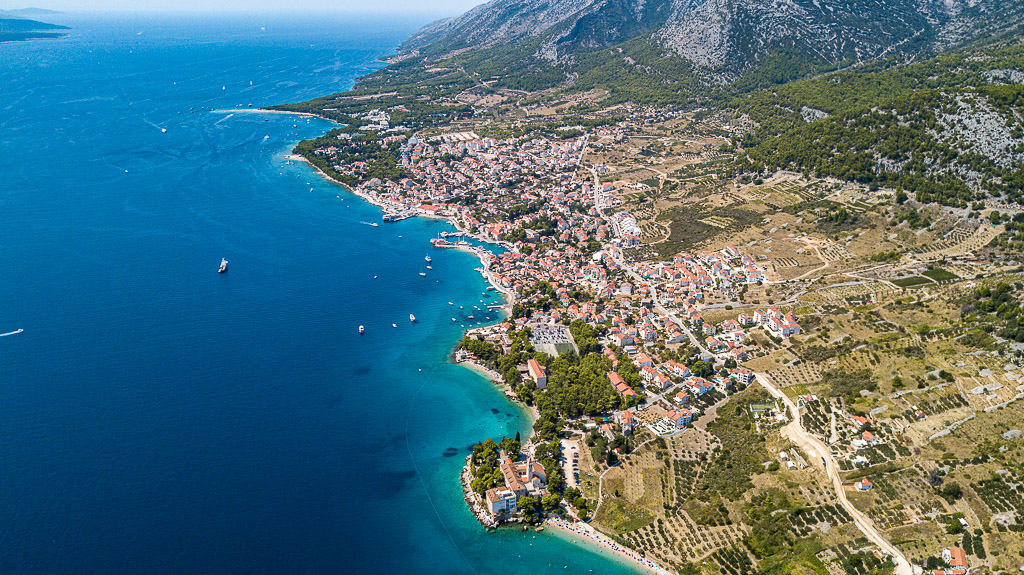
- Panoramic view of Bol, with the Zlatni Rat visible in the distance

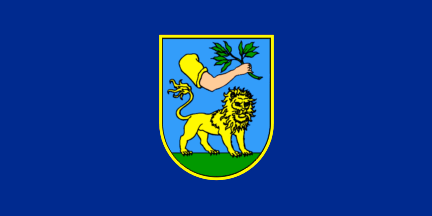
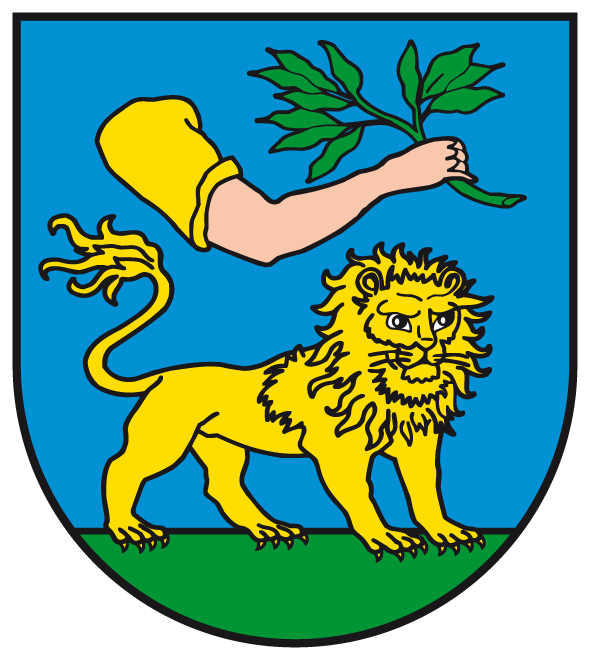
- Flag Seal

- Location of Bol in Croatia
- Coordinates: 43°16′N 16°39′E
- Country: Croatia
- Region: Dalmatia
- County: Split-Dalmatia County
- Island: Brač

Government
  - Mayor: Katarina Marčić (Ind.)

Area
  - Municipality: 23.3 km^{2} (9.0 sq mi)
  - Urban: 23.0 km^{2} (8.9 sq mi)

Population (2021)
  - Municipality: 1,678
  - Density: 72.0/km^{2} (187/sq mi)
  - Urban: 1,656
  - Urban density: 72.0/km^{2} (186/sq mi)
- Time zone: UTC+1 (CET)
  - Summer (DST): UTC+2 (CEST)
- Postal code: 21420 Bol
- Area code: 021
- Website: bol.hr

Bol is a municipality consisting of the town of Bol and the village Murvica on the south side of the island of Brač in the Split-Dalmatia County of Croatia.

In the 2021 census, the total population was 1,678. The population consists of 1,661 Croats and 17 foreigners. The most common family names in Bol are Marinković, Karmelić, Eterović, Baković, and Pavišić. In the 2011 census, the total population was 1,630.

Bol (its name is derived from the Latin word "vallum") is renowned for its most popular beach, the Zlatni Rat ("Golden cape" or "Golden horn"). It is a promontory composed mostly of pebble rock that visibly shifts with current, wind, and waves. The Adriatic Sea water at Zlatni Rat is crystal clear. There is a beach on either side of the promontory (spit). Bol is a popular tourist destination known for its harbourside bars, restaurants, and wind surfing conditions.

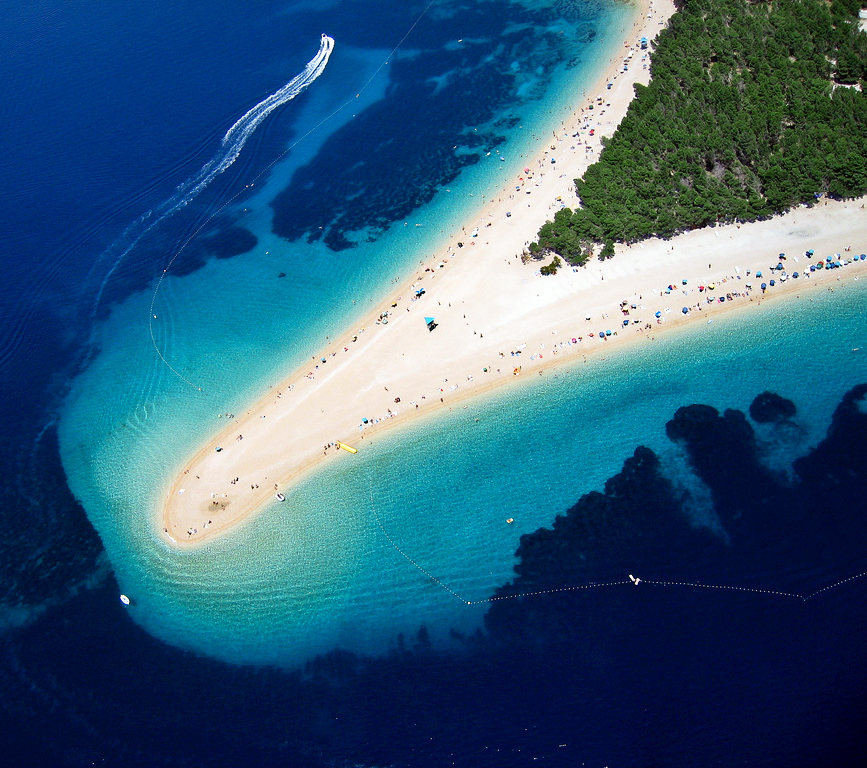
The Zlatni Rat beach

Bol is also known for its Dominican monastery, and its church of St. Mary of Mercy, built and rebuilt at various stages throughout the 16th century. It received its present-day Baroque form in 1641. The main altar, dedicated to the Blessed Virgin Mary, is the work of the world-famous Venetian painter Jacopo Tintoretto. The authenticity of the painting is confirmed by records of the monastery archives, which describe the acquisition of this precious painting in detail. The Dominican Monastery museum is rich with artifacts and is known for its valuable art collection, it also contains several paintings by Tripo Kokolja.

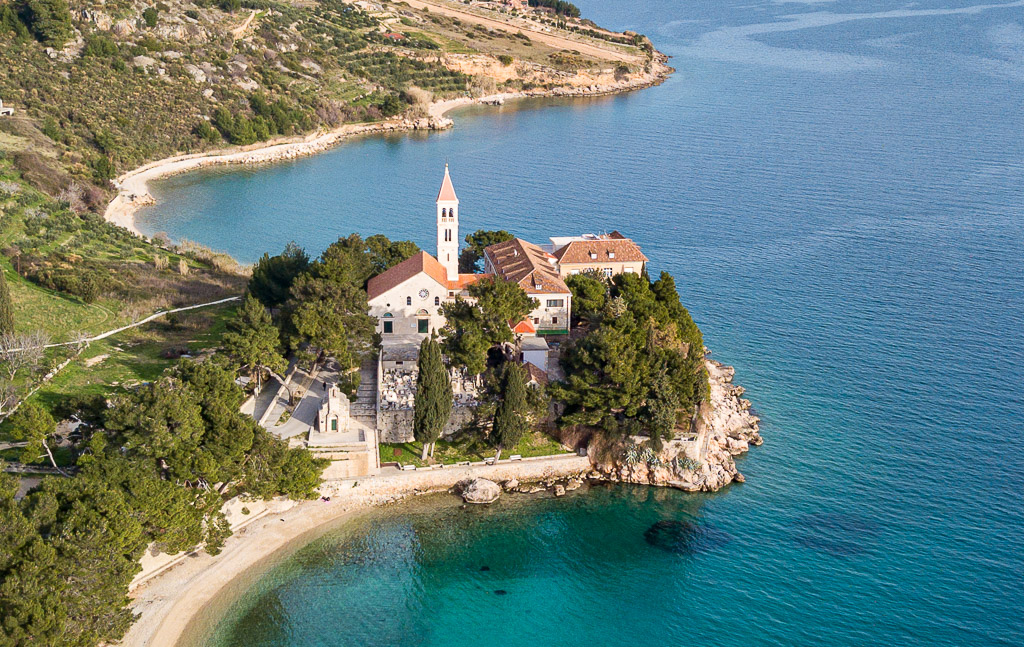
Dominican monastery

Also one of the things Bol is known for is its red wine Plavac Mali. Plavac Mali, among other wines, is currently produced by the Stina winery in the center of the town of Bol. The building where the winery is located was originally built in 1903 by the local Viners guild, which is also the oldest Viners guild in Dalmatia.

== Climate ==
Since records began in 1981, the highest temperature recorded at the local weather station was 39.0 °C (102.2 °F), on 9 August 2017. The coldest temperature was −7.4 °C (18.7 °F), on 7 January 2017.

== Demographics ==
In 2021, the municipality had 1678 residents in the following 2 settlements:

- Bol, population 1656
- Murvica, population 22
Bol: Population trends 1857–2021
v

population	1698	1631	1872	1960	2095	2101	1628	1491	1179	1143	1066	1101	1113	1507	1661	1630	1678
	1857	1869	1880	1890	1900	1910	1921	1931	1948	1953	1961	1971	1981	1991	2001	2011	2021

Sources: Croatian Bureau of Statistics publications

== International relations ==
=== Twin towns — Sister cities ===
Bol is twinned with:

- Omiš, Croatia

== See also ==
- Croatian Bol Ladies Open
