= Zlatni Rat =

Spit of land west from Bol on the coast of the Croatian island of Brač

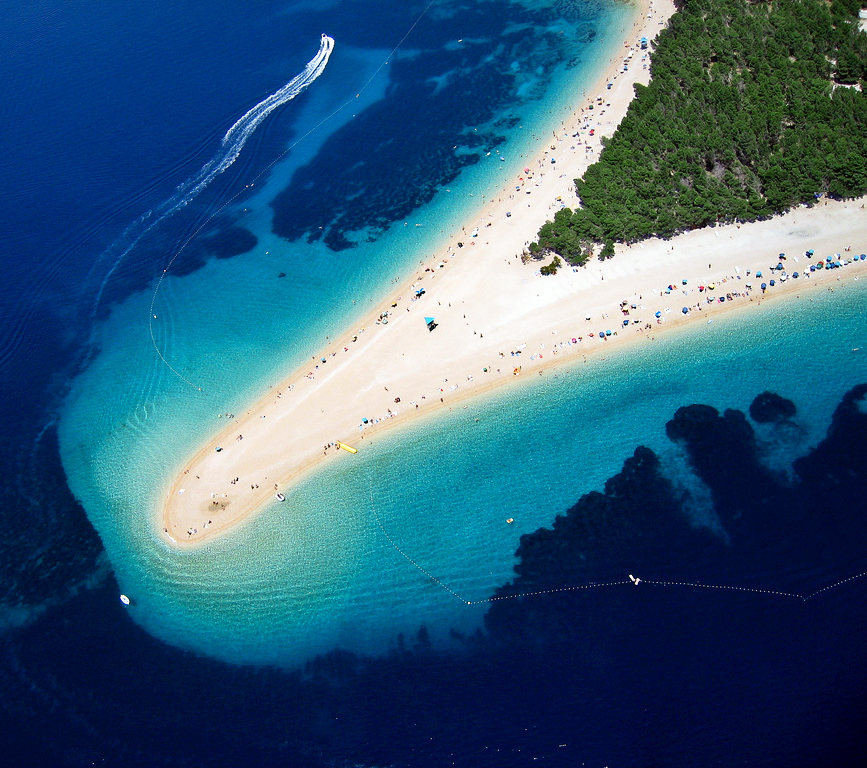

- Location within Croatia
- Interactive map of Zlatni Rat

Geography
- Location: Adriatic Sea
- Coordinates: 43°15′21″N 16°38′02″E

Administration
- Croatia
- County: Split-Dalmatia County

The Zlatni Rat, often referred to as the Golden Cape or Golden Horn (translated from the local Chakavian dialect), is a spit of land located about 2 kilometres (1 mile) west from the harbour town of Bol on the southern coast of the Croatian island of Brač, in the region of Dalmatia. It extends southward into the Hvar Channel, a body of water in the Adriatic Sea between the islands of Brač and Hvar, which is home to strong currents. The landform itself is mostly composed of a white pebble beach, with a Mediterranean pine grove taking up the remainder.

Zlatni Rat has been regularly listed as one of the top beaches in Europe and in the World. Its distinctive shape can be seen in many travel brochures, which made it one of the symbols of Croatian tourism. In 2008 Red Bull organized Red Bull Golden Jump, a unique kiteboarding competition in jumping/flying over the beach.

== Description ==
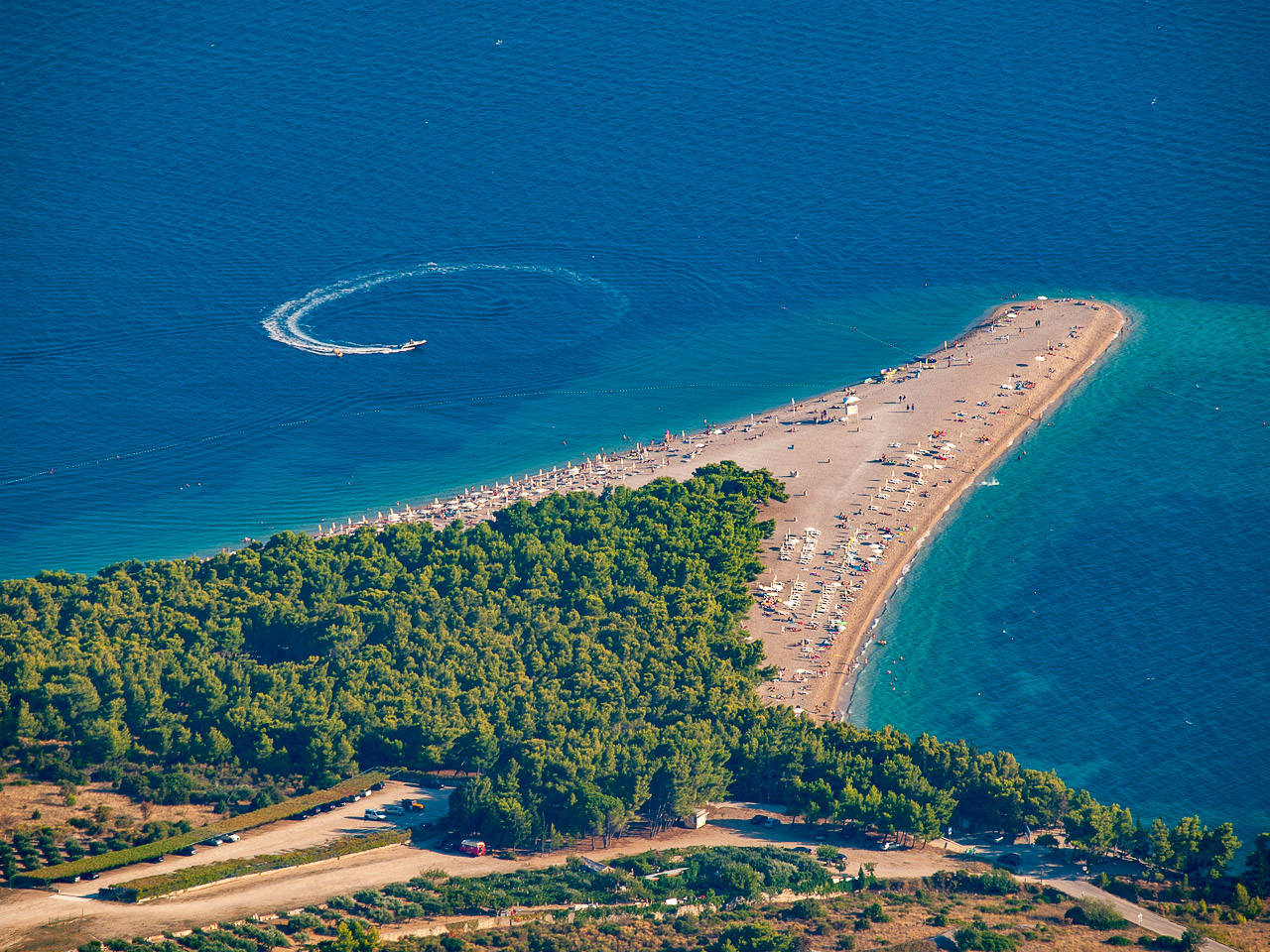
Zlatni rat beach seen from Vidova gora mountain

The beaches on either side of the spit, measured in 2015 east side was 377 metres (1,237 ft) and the west side was 479 metres (1,572 ft) long, but the exact shape and length of the landform varies with regard to changes in tide, current, waves and wind. The spit points directly south. The farthest end, which is usually turned slightly toward the east, will often shift to the west in certain weather conditions, esp. a strong south-easterly wind known in Croatia as the Jugo. Changes in the shape of the beach occur mostly from autumn to spring during strong winds and currents. In summer the spit is either straight or turned to east due to daily afternoon west thermic wind Maestral. During extreme weather with stormy winds and waves, the top can shift from one side to the other in a matter of hours. The promontory is protected as a geomorphological phenomenon.

The sea is normally warmer on the west side, contrary to that side being the windy/wavy side on most afternoons. The current on the top can be mildly hazardous for swimmers who venture far southward from the tip toward the open sea, as it could be difficult to swim back west toward the beach (the swimmer being well over 150 metres (500 ft) from the coast); the danger is not severe, however, as the standard current would carry the swimmer back east toward the harbor of Bol (and the beaches on the promontory of land that lies between Zlatni Rat and the town). A reliable afternoon westerly wind known as a Maestral has made the beach a destination for windsurfers.

== Roman piscine, remains of villa rustica ==
The pine tree grove that borders the beach is home to the remnants of a Roman villa rustica, which included a swimming pool. The westernmost edge of the beach, and several coves to the west of the main beach, are traditionally clothing-optional.

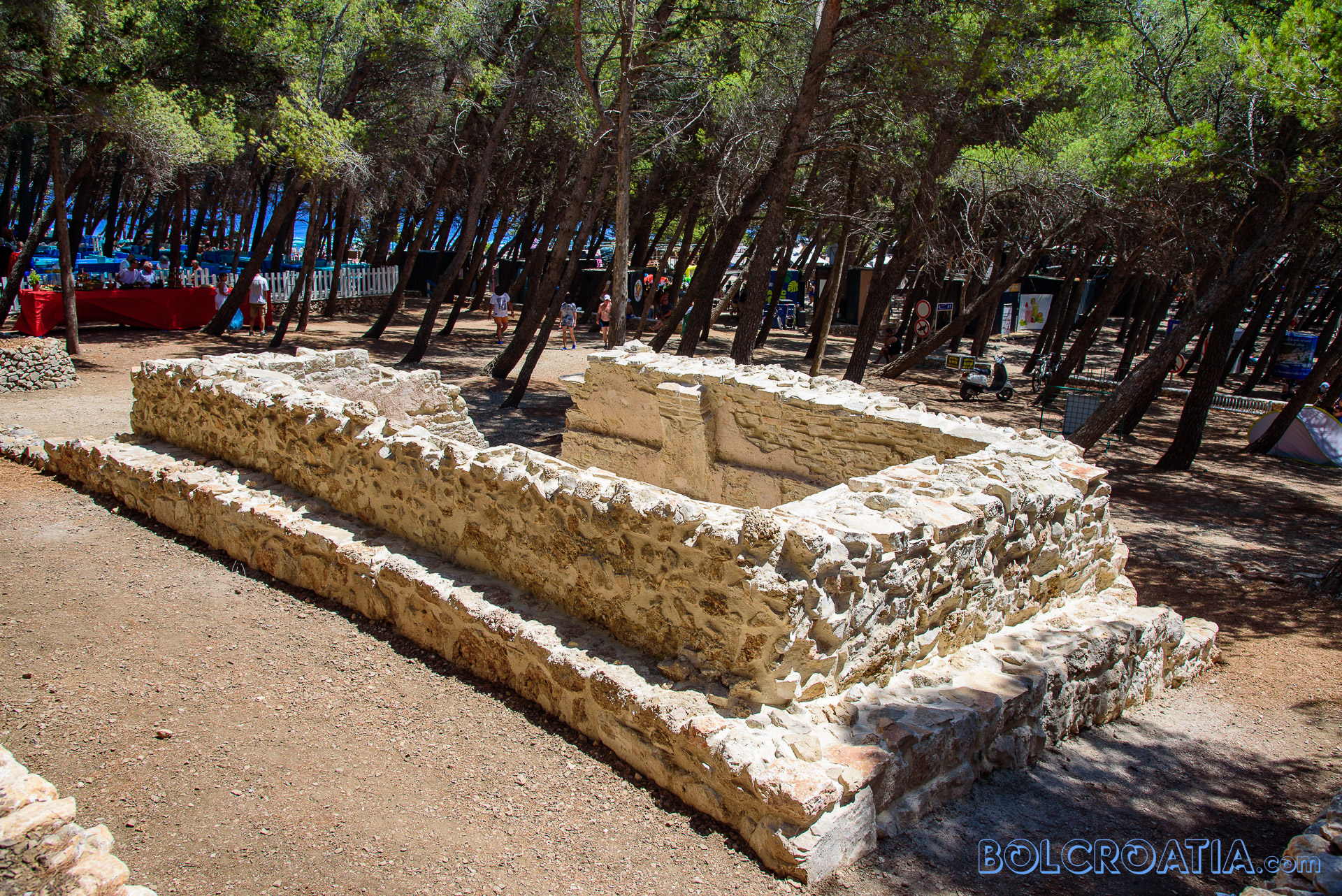
Roman piscine in Bol, Croatia on Zlatni rat

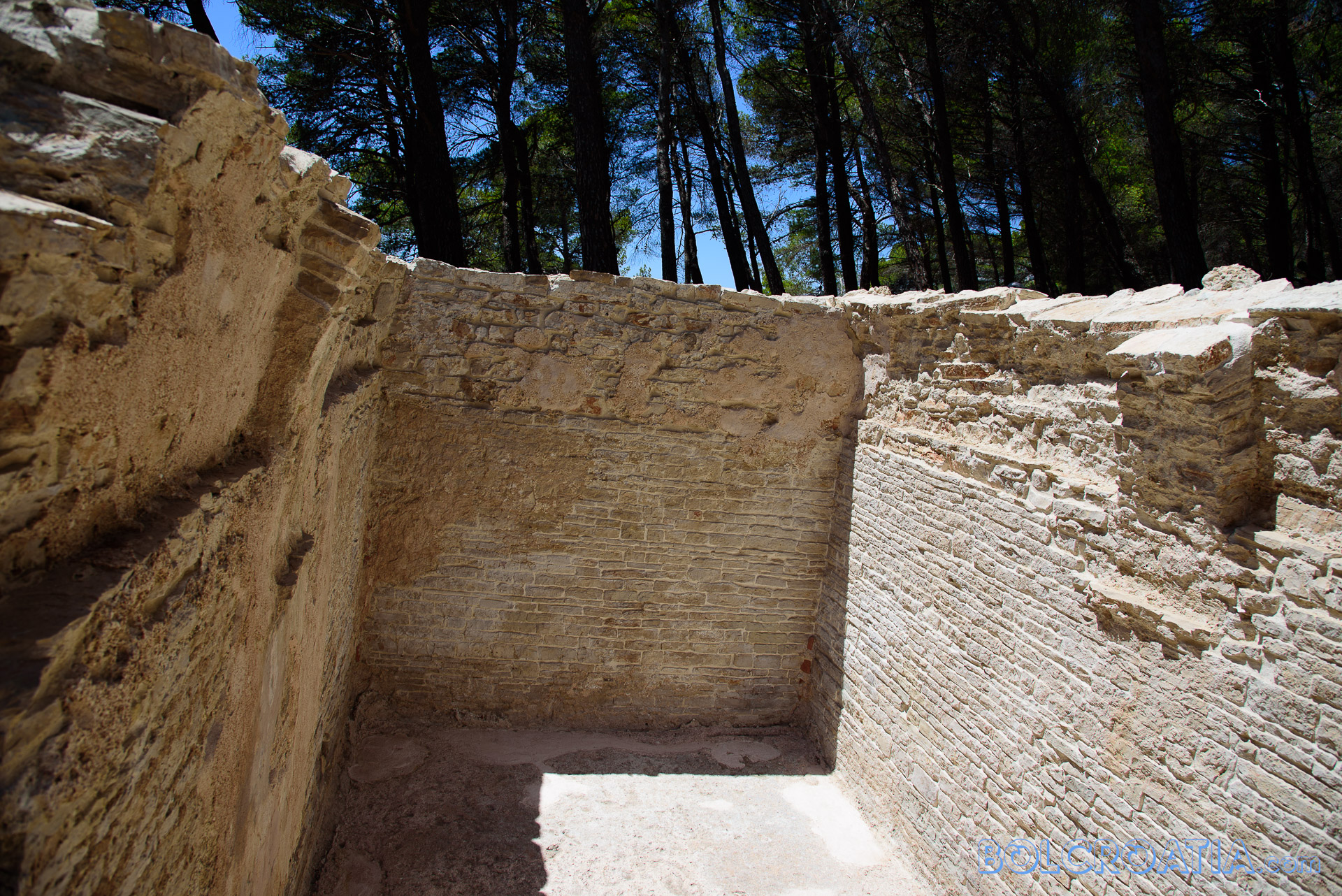
Inside of the Roman piscine

== Gallery ==
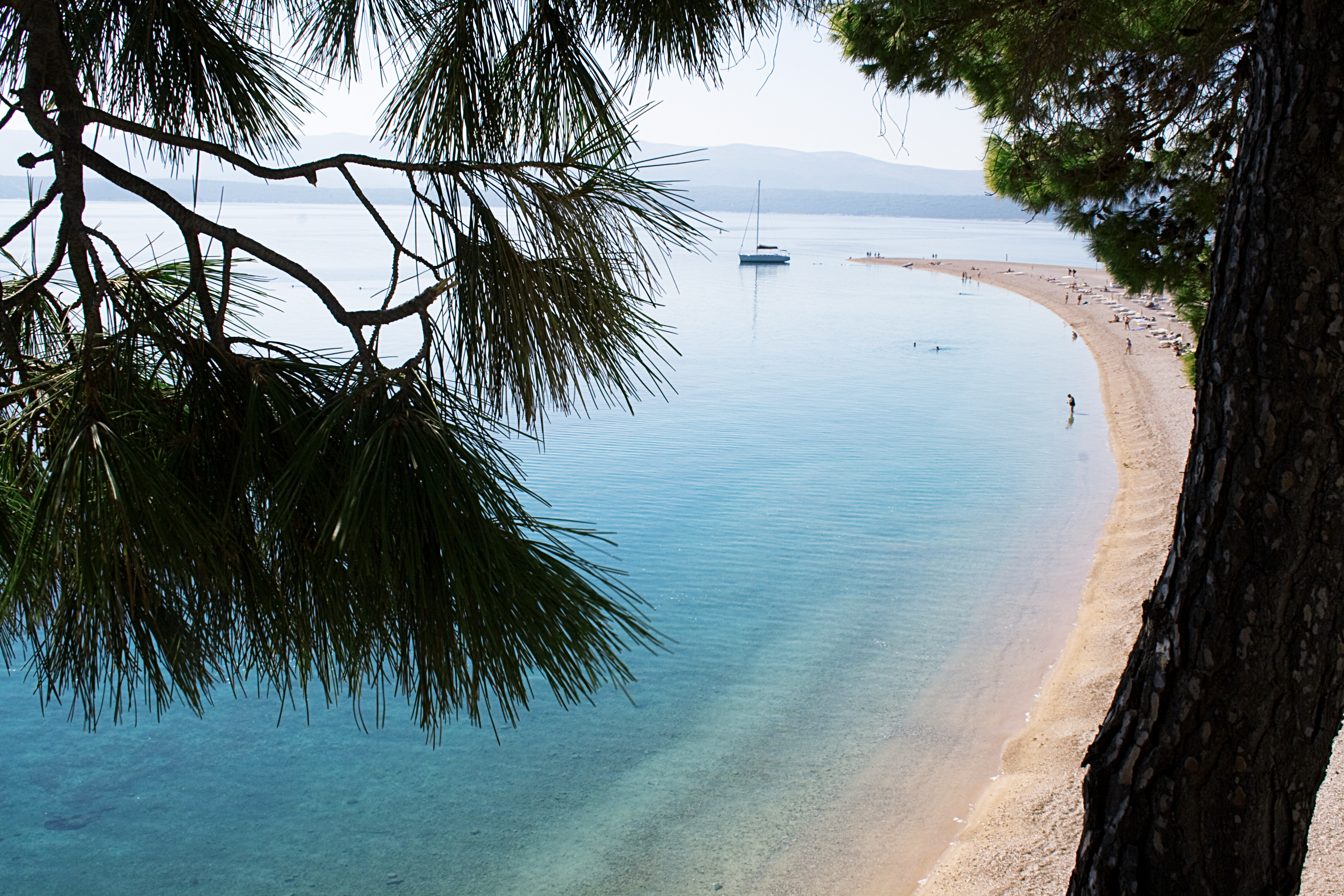
Eastern bank of the Zlatni Rat

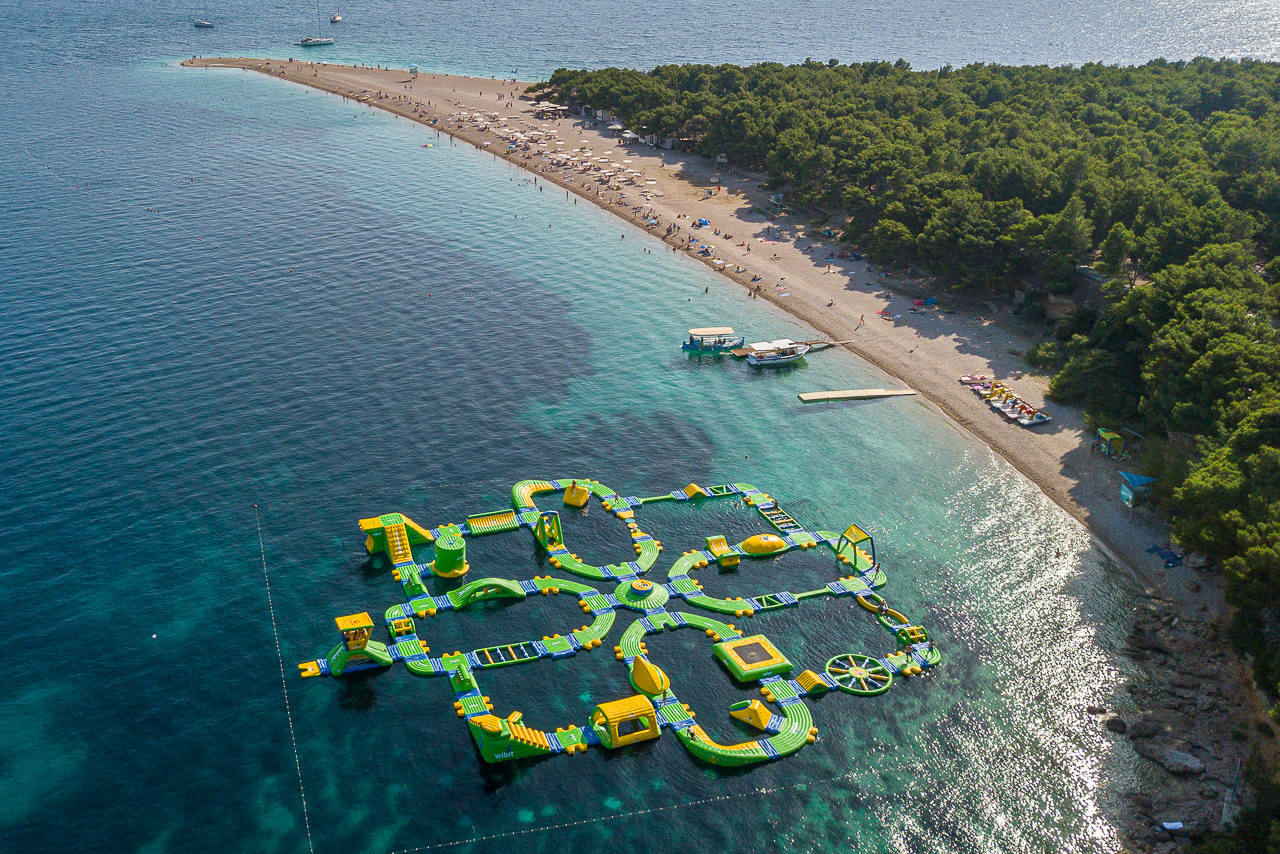
Aquapark on Zlatni rat beach

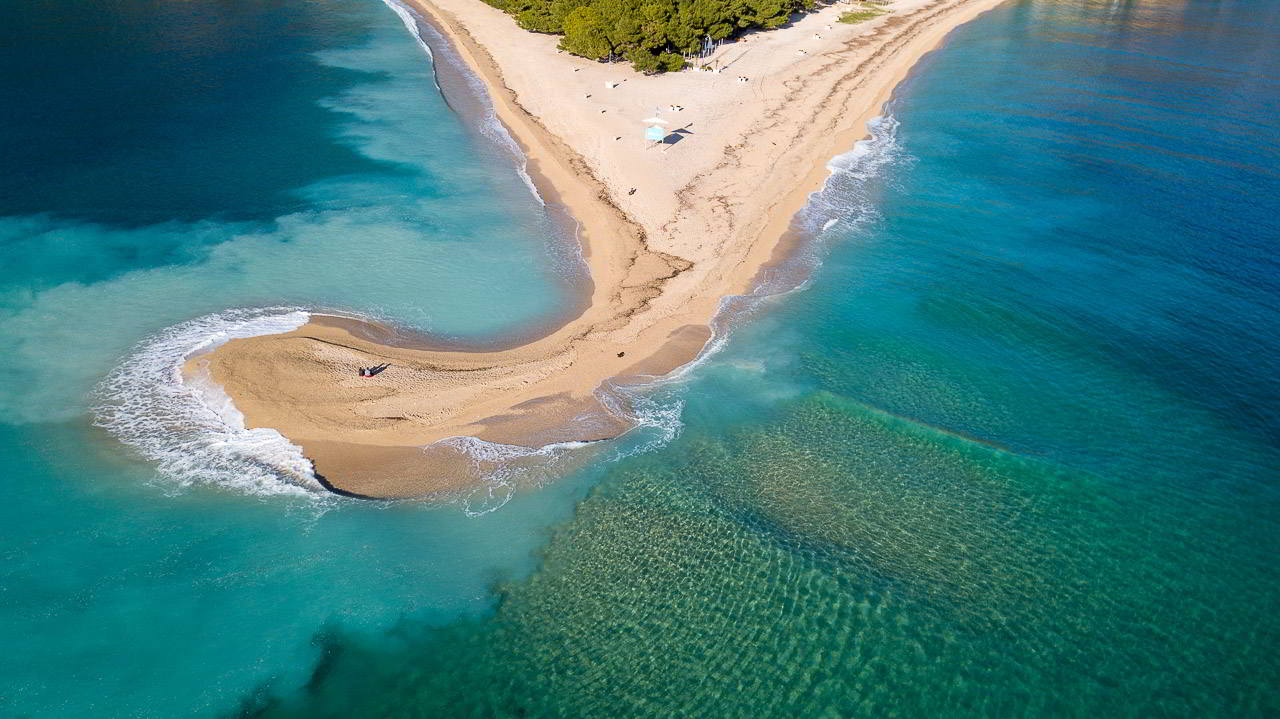
Zlatni rat beach turned west

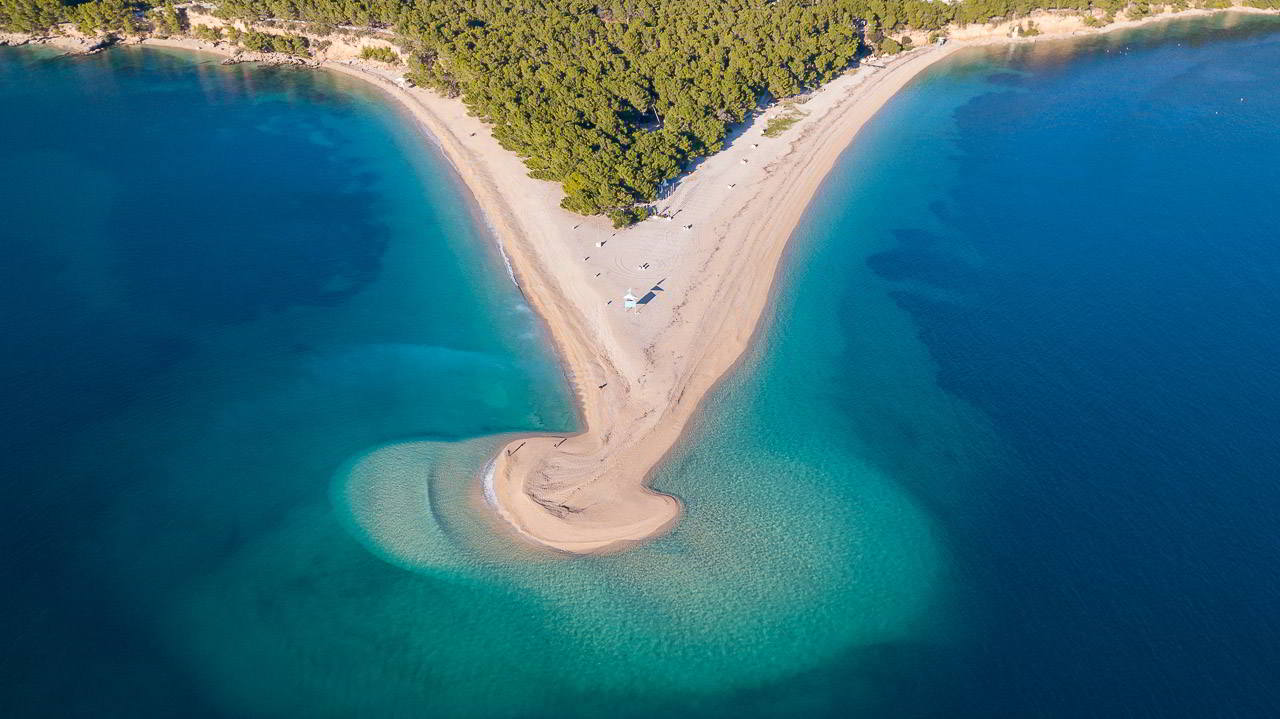
Top of the Zlatni rat beach

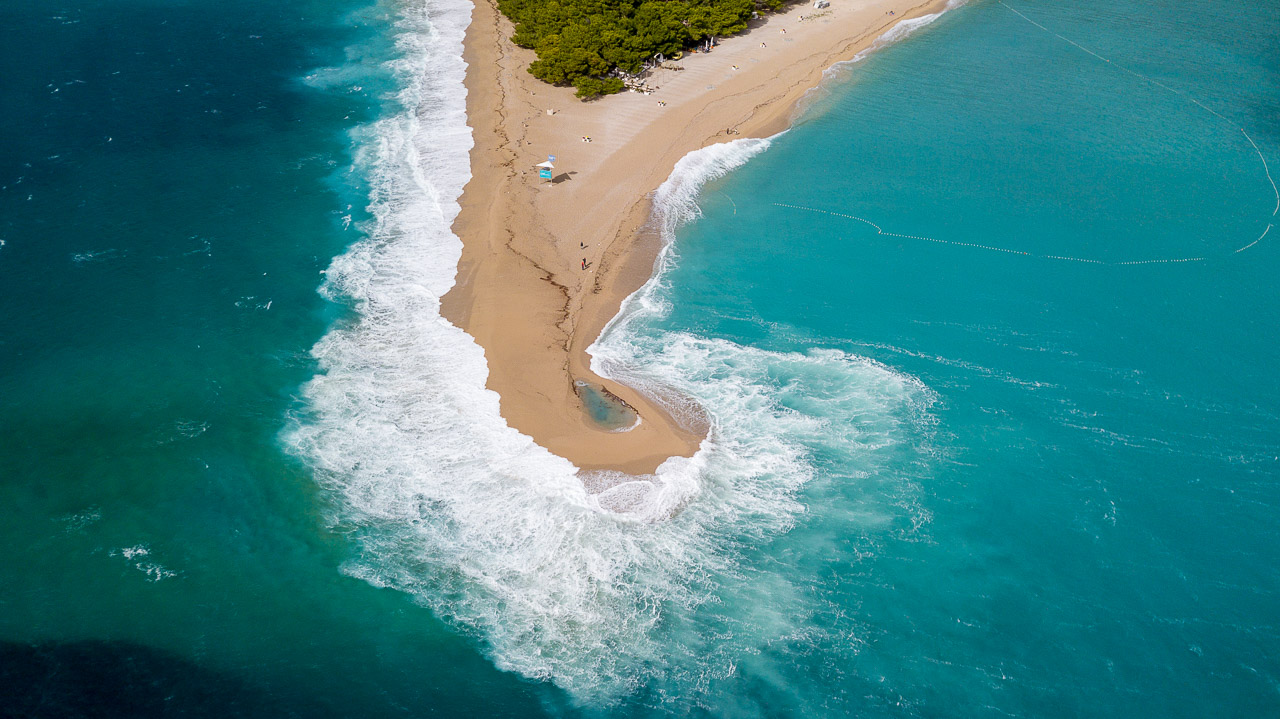
Zlatni rat beach turned east

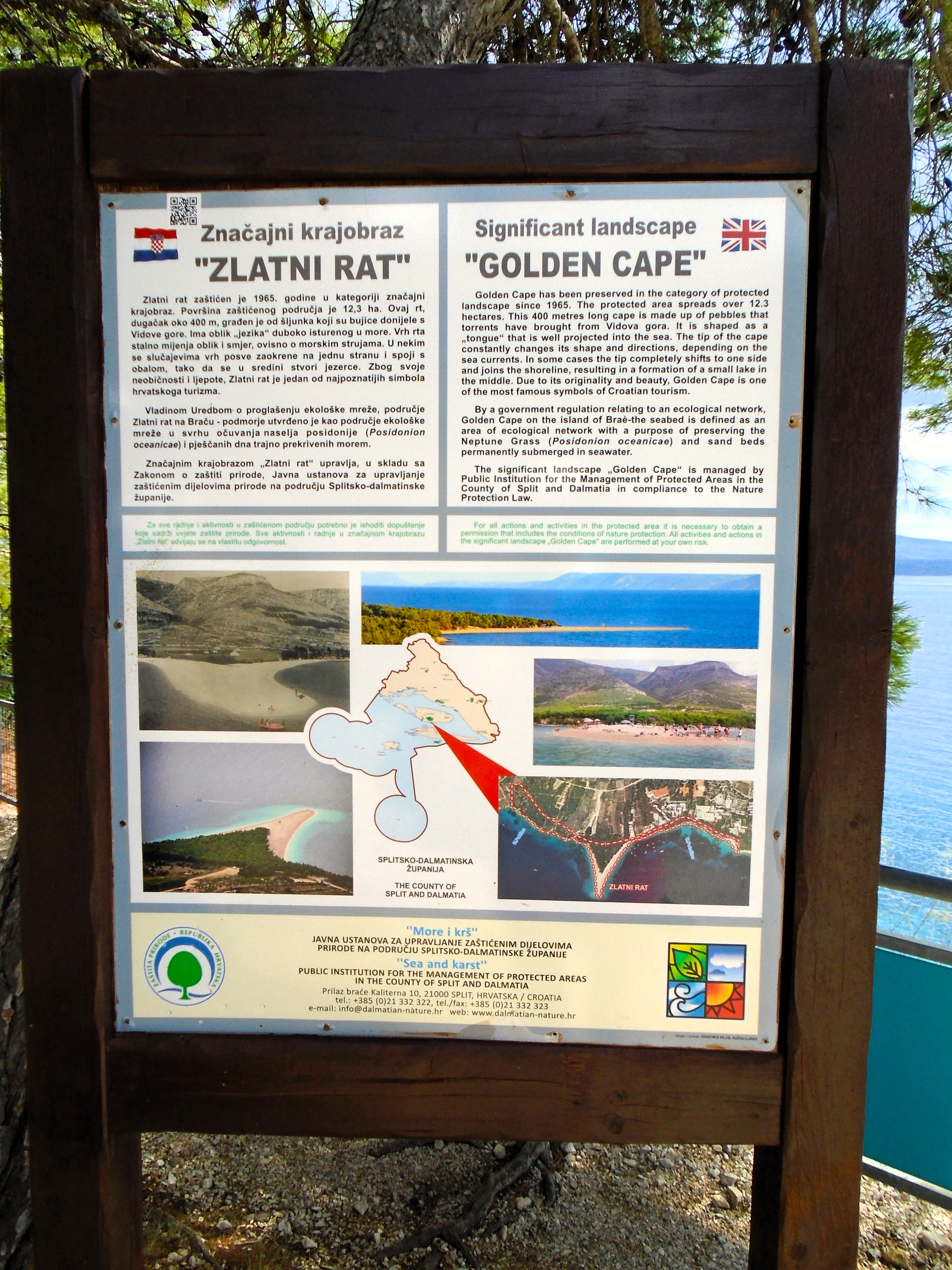
Informational board at Zlatni rat beach

== See also ==
- Bol, Croatia
- Dalmatia
- Brač
- Adriatic Sea
