= Drakonjina špilja =

Cave on Brač, Croatia

Coordinates: 43°16′09″N 16°35′56″E

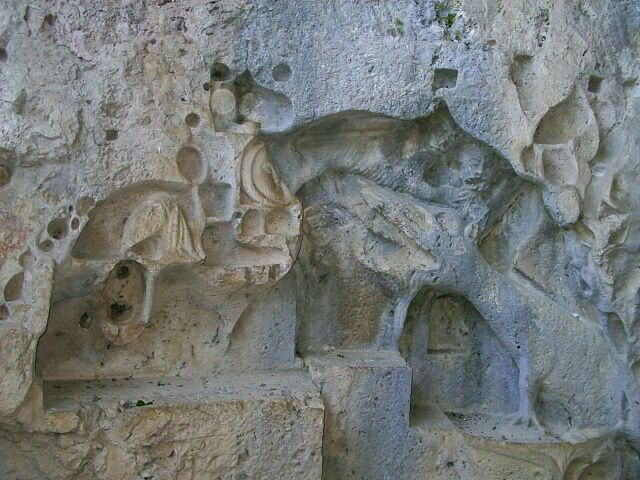
Picture of the dragon relief

Drakonjina špilja (meaning "Dragon's cave"), also known as Zmajeva pećina ("Wurm's cave"), is called so because of the mysterious relief of a dragon found inside. It is located immediately above Murvica, on the island of Brač, in Croatia.

The dragon was carved by unknown monk in the 15th century, when the monks lived in the caves and even built a chapel in them. As well as the dragon, there is also a carving of the moon and other ancient cult symbols. On the eastern side over the chapel, there are carved human figures and birds on their nests, indicating that this was a Christian sanctuary, which nevertheless had elements of pagan religions.

The church which serves Murvica is in the former hermitage in Dračeva luka. The vaulting in this church, which dates from the 16th century, is formed by the natural rock of the cave. On the façade there is a characteristic portal and a rose window. A new, modern church was built in Murvica after the Second World War.

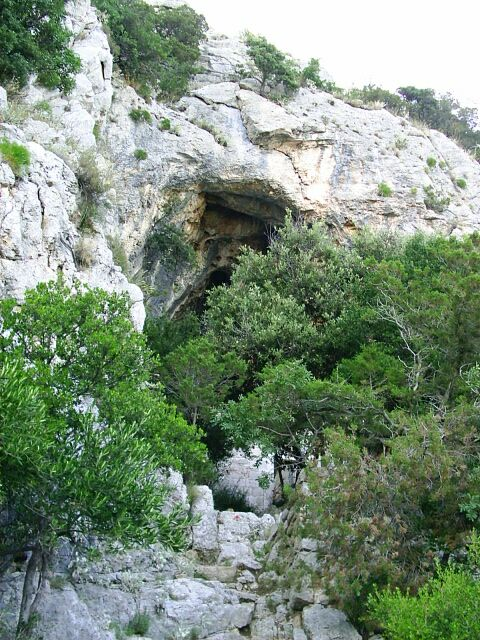
Entrance to the cave

== See also ==
- List of Dinaric caves
- Vela Spila
