= Murvica, Split-Dalmatia County =

Murvica
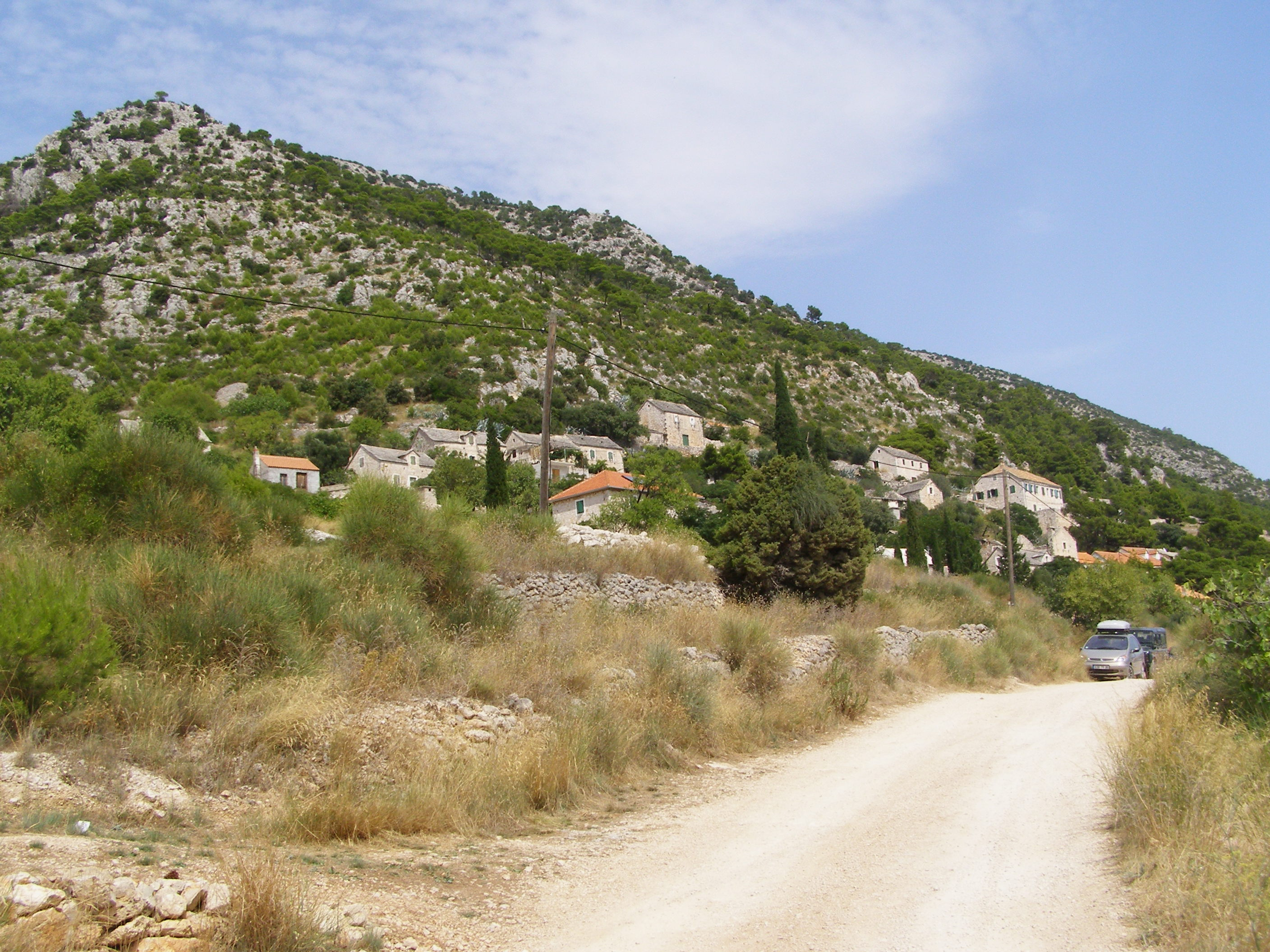

- Location within Croatia
- Coordinates: 43°16′0″N 16°35′35″E
- Country: Croatia
- County: Split-Dalmatia
- Municipality: Bol

Area
  - Total: 0.3 km^{2} (0.12 sq mi)

Population (2021)
  - Total: 22
  - Density: 73/km^{2} (190/sq mi)
- Time zone: UTC+1 (CET)
  - Summer (DST): UTC+2 (CEST)

Murvica (Croatian pronunciation: [mûrvit͡sa]) is a 22-inhabitant small village 6 km west of Bol, on the island Brač, in Croatia. It is situated among karst caves along the southern side of the island and was mentioned for the first time in 1286. Later it developed as a supply centre for the many hermits living there.

Monks and nuns from Poljica fleeing from the Turks came to Murvica in the 15th century. Over Dračeva luka, near Murvica, priests from Poljica built a monastery in 1512 and nuns built their own hermitage. Dutić was also first mentioned in 1512.

Two more monasteries were built beneath the rocks over Murvica, the Stipančić in 1416 and the Silvio Hermitage in 1497. Monastic life in these hermitages around Murvica continued right up to the Second World War.

== See also ==
- Drakonjina špilja
