= Brač =

Island in Croatia

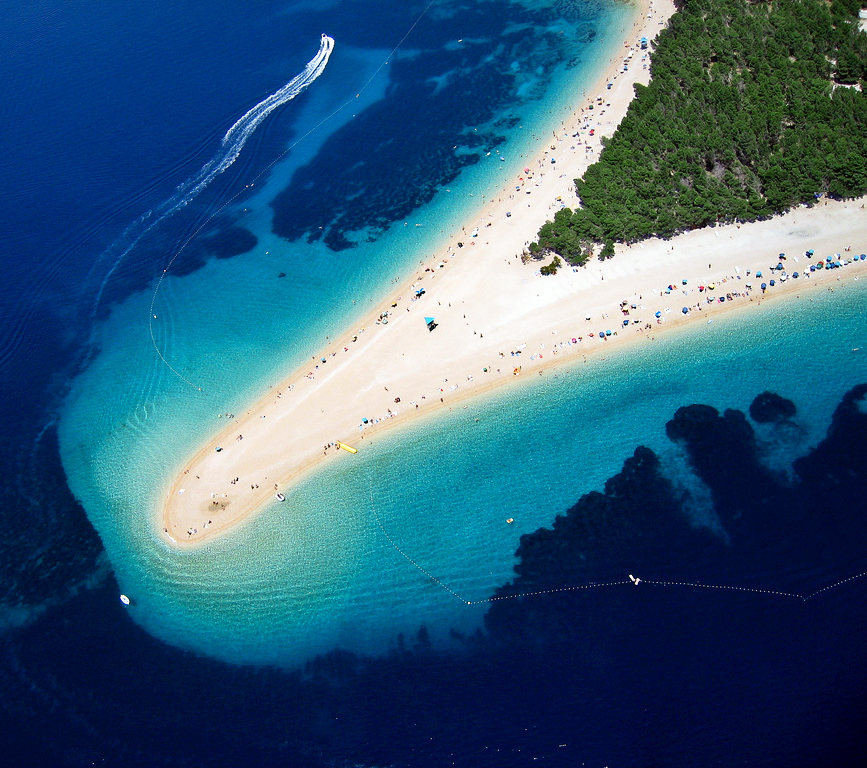
- Zlatni Rat

- Location within Croatia
- Interactive map of Brač

Geography
- Location: Adriatic Sea
- Coordinates: 43°19′N 16°38′E
- Archipelago: Dalmatian Archipelago
- Area: 396 km^{2} (153 sq mi)
- Highest elevation: 780 m (2560 ft)
- Highest point: Vidova gora

Administration
- Croatia
- County: Split-Dalmatia County
- Largest settlement: Supetar (pop. 3,326)

Demographics
- Population: 13,931 (2021)
- Pop. density: 35/km^{2} (91/sq mi)
- Ethnic groups: Croats (95.3%)

Brač is a Croatian island in the Adriatic Sea, with an area of 396 square kilometres (153 sq mi), making it the largest island in Dalmatia, and the third largest in the Adriatic. It is separated from the mainland by the Brač Channel, which is 5 to 13 km (3 to 8 mi) wide. The island's tallest peak, Vidova gora, stands at 780 m (2,560 ft), making it the highest point of the Adriatic islands. The island has a population of 13,931, making it also by population the largest island in Dalmatia and the third largest in the Adriatic. The island is divided in eight municipal units with twenty-two settlements, ranging from the main town Supetar, with more than 3,300 inhabitants, to Murvica, where less than two dozen people live. Brač Airport is the largest airport of all islands surrounding Split.

Brač is known as a tourist destination, for the Zlatni Rat beach in Bol, the marina in Milna, the white limestone which was used for the palace of Diocletian, the stonemason school in Pučišća, the Charter of Povlja, author and first president of Croatia Vladimir Nazor, its olive oil with protected designation of origin, the Kopačina cave near Donji Humac with archaeological findings dating to the 12th millennium BCE, the Blaca hermitage, and other things.

== Name ==
Brač (pronounced [brâːtʃ]) is known in some of its local Chakavian dialects as Broč (pronounced [broːtʃ]). In Latin: Bretia or Brattia and Italian: Brazza. The Greek name of the island was Ἐλαφοῦσσα (Elaphousa/Elaphussa), apparently derived from elaphos ("stag"). Based on this, it has been speculated that the original name of the island may have been derived from Messapic *brentos ("stag"). The Messapic word is deduced from a gloss "brendon — elaphon [deer]". Polybius and Plinius record the name of the island as Brattia. Other names through history for Brač have been Brectia, Bractia, Brazia, Elaphusa, Bretanide and Krateiai (in the Periplus of Pseudo-Scylax, identification unsure).

Stephanus of Byzantium writes in the 6th century in his Ethnica of Brettia:

Brettia, Island in the Adriatic Sea, with a river called Brettios. Greeks call it Elaphussa, the inhabitants Brettanis. The ethnicon should be Brettians, given how Polybios uses the Femininum. Today it is called Brettians.

== Geography ==
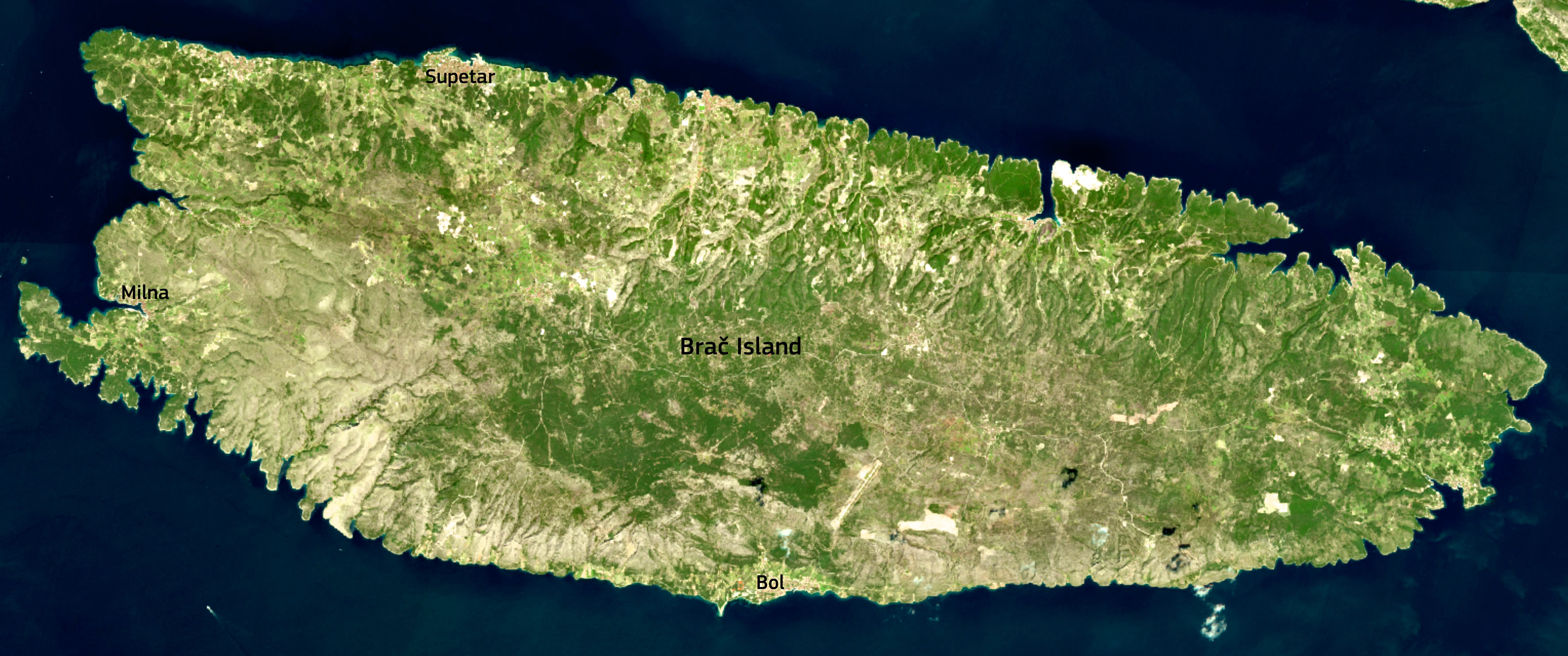
Brač island, image by Sentinel-2 from 7 May 2023

Brač is with an area of 396 square kilometres (153 sq mi) the largest island in Dalmatia, and the third largest island in the Adriatic Sea overall. The island is roughly oval-shaped, being almost 40 km (25 mi) wide from east to west, and about 14 km (8.7 mi) north to south. Brač has a long and folded coastline with a length of more than 180 km (110 mi), with numerous small and larger bays. Particularly noticeable are the natural harbours of Supetar, Splitska, Pučišća, and Povlja, Sumartin, Milna and Bobovišća.

Brač is separated from the mainland to the north by the Brač Channel, which is 5 to 13 km (3 to 8 mi) wide and down to 78m deep. To the north it faces Split and Omiš. To the east it is separated from the mainland by a continuation of the Brač channel, with distances between 6 km (3.7 mi) at Baška voda up to 10 km (6.2 mi) at Makarska. To the south it faces the neighbouring island of Hvar, separated by the Hvar Channel with a maximal depth of 91m. The closest distance is between Murvica and the northern beaches of Hvar with less than 4 km (2.5 mi), up to about 14 km (8.7 mi) at the east and west ends of Brač. To the west, it is separated from the island of Šolta by the Split Gates, which is about 800m wide. The uninhabited islet of Mrduja lies in the Split Gates. In an annual event, people from Brač and people from Šolta play a game of tug of war over the islet.

The island has been called the island without water (Croatian: otok bez vode), but it does have a small number of sweet water springs. Most of the water needs to be brought from the mainland from the Cetina river through a pipe. An artificial tunnel has been built from the northern side of the island through the mountain to the south side, in order to allow the pipe to continue and serve not only Bol and Murvica, the two sole settlements on the southern side of the island, but also to continue to the neighbouring island Hvar.

The island is more rugged and mountainous than any of the other Dalmatian islands. The island's tallest peak, Vidova gora, or Mount St. Vid, stands at 780 m (2,560 ft), making it the highest island point of the Adriatic islands. The south side of the island is particularly steep, as the distance from the beach to the Vidova Gora peak in only about 2 km (1.2 mi) – and 780 meters (2,560 ft) up. The steepness of the south side makes the many natural bays hard to reach. Because of that, the south side of the island only has two settlements, Bol and tiny Murvica. It also makes the south side particularly amenable for vineyards. The east of the island is a high plateau. Until the Middle Ages, most of the population lived inland.

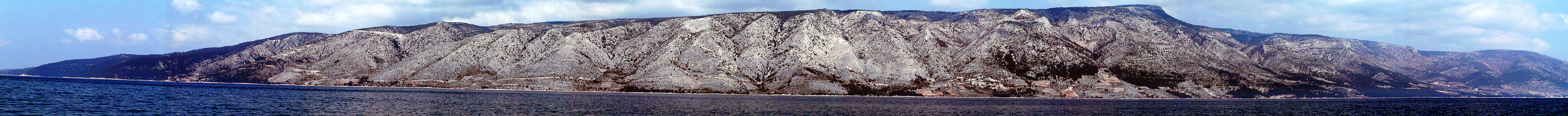
Southern side of Brač

=== Geology ===
The island is mostly made of limestone, which has shaped the history and economy of the island. The limestone originated in the Cretaceous about 100 million years ago, but Brač became an island only after the last ice age, (within the last 12,000 years, in the Holocene). Due to erosion and sedimentation, the island also has sandstone, breccia, clay, and terra rossa.

=== Settlements ===
The twenty-two populated settlements of Brač are subdivided into eight municipal units (see Administration below for more details). A number of small unincorporated settlements can be found in the Selca municipality, including Nadsela, Podsmrčevik, Osridke, Nakal, and Nagorinac. The island also has a number of abandoned settlements, such as Podhume, Smrka, Straževnik, Gradac, Dubravica i Mošuje, Podgračišće, and others. Other places of interest are the Blaca hermitage and Drakonjina špilja.

=== Administration ===
Municipal borders on Brač

The island is administratively divided into eight units, one city (a type of municipal unit with a larger town) and seven municipalities. These cover the twenty-two currently populated settlements of the island. Population numbers in the previous section are given per 2021 census. The island is part of the Split-Dalmatia County, but is not represented there as a whole, only through its city and municipalities.

The division into seven municipalities and a city happened after the administrative reorganisation of Croatia following Croatian independence in 1991. Before that, Brač was a single municipality (općina) in Yugoslavia with Supetar as the seat of the municipality. Still today, many of the administrative duties for the other seven municipalities are delegated to the city of Supetar.

With the arrival of the Narentines in the seventh or eighth century, the now abandoned Gradac became the first administrative centre of Brač. Venice declared in the late tenth century that Nerežišća should become the administrative and governmental centre of Brač. In 1827 this role was given to Supetar by the Austro-Hungarian administration. The island was divided into 21 cadastral communities by the Austro-Hungarian administration - corresponding to the currently existing settlements besides Ložišća, which was a part of Bobovišća. These cadastral communities were mostly preexisting administrative units and not introduced by the Austro-Hungarians.

In terms of the Roman Catholic church, the island has 23 parishes: one for each of the settlements, and an additional one for the hermitage Blaca. All parishes of Brač have been part of the Roman Catholic Diocese of Hvar-Brač-Vis, with the seat of the Bishop in Hvar since it was founded in 1145, and belonged previously to the Diocese of Salona.

== History ==
The Kopačina cave near Donji Humac is one of the oldest traces of human habitation in Dalmatia. And yet, Brač has been called island without history (otok bez povijest) by Vladimir Nazor, easily the island's most well known author. Unlike all of the other larger islands, neither the Illyrians (who arrived in the 2nd millennium BCE), nor the Greek (4th century BCE), nor the Romans (1st century CE) have established a larger settlement on the island. It is only well after the Slavs settled (8th century) and the Venetians took over the administration of the island (10th century), that the island saw larger settlements and towns develop. First, Gradac was the administrative centre, which moved to Nerežišća between 937 and 1000, and finally Supetar in 1827.

The history of Brač follows mostly the history of Dalmatia. Who ruled the island changed frequently. Some, like Rome or Venice, ruled for centuries, others, like the Normans, for a single year. But independently of who ruled the island, the island had an internal autonomous administration as described in the statutes of Brač, which allowed the island to develop a certain continuity - independently of whether the island was ruled from Byzantium, Vienna, or Paris. More important were the constant attacks by pirates, particularly from the Narentines and later the Kačić family in Omiš, which kept Brač in poverty and didn't allow for towns to develop along the coast well into the 15th century.

=== Prehistory (before the 3rd century BCE) ===
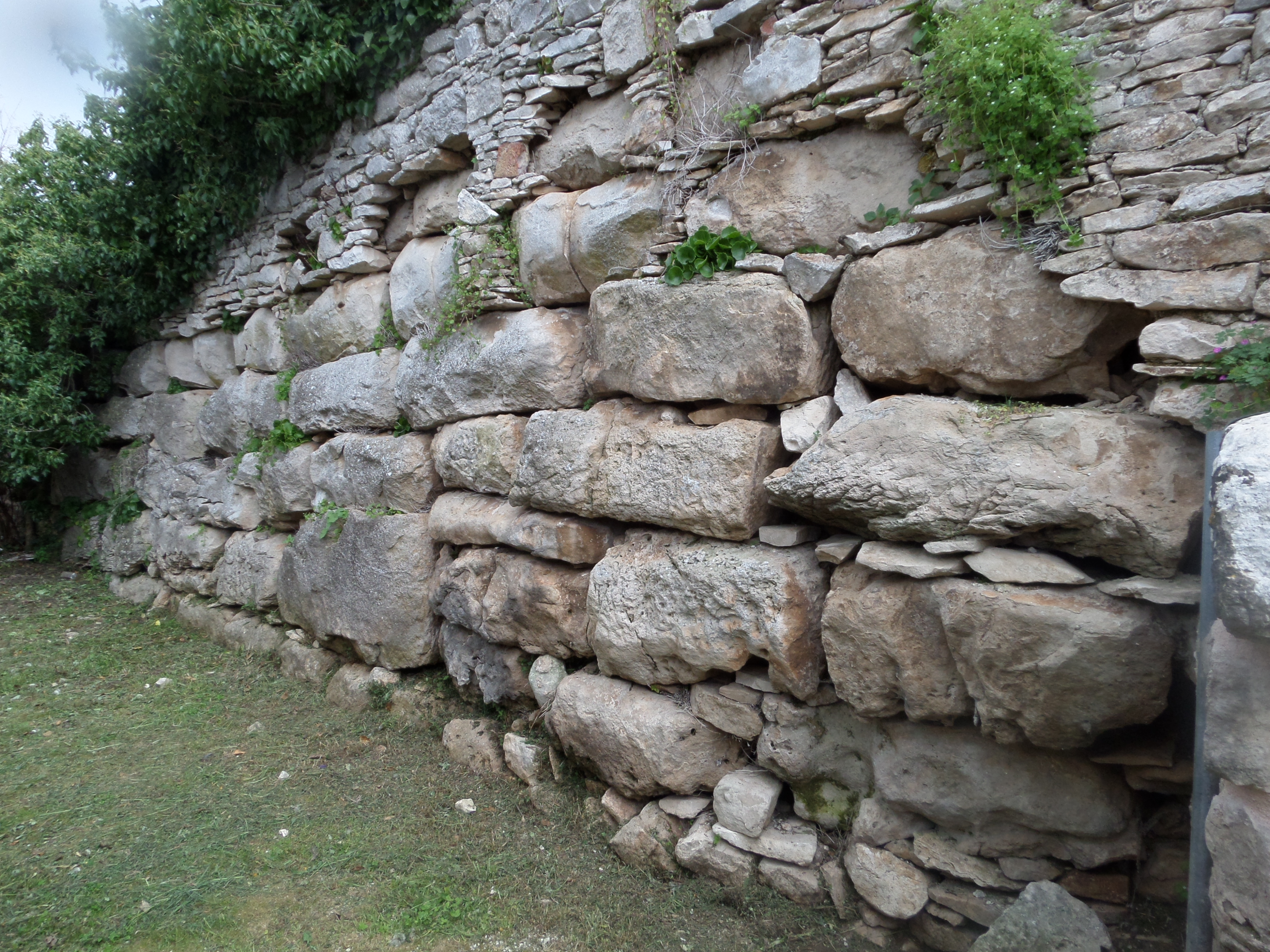
Illyrian wall near Škrip

Archaeological findings in the Kopačina cave between Supetar and Donji Humac have been dated to the 12th millennium BCE. These are some of the oldest traces of human habitation in Dalmatia. The findings show that the cave has been inhabited until the 3rd millennium BCE (although not continuously). Some of the artefacts have originated in the Dalmatian hinterland, showing that Brač was part of a trade network with the mainland. In the Stone Age, the population seemed to have lived mostly inland.

In the second millennium BCE, the Illyrians moved in from the North and Northeast to the Balkan peninsula, including Brač. They replaced the previous population.

In the Bronze Age and Iron Age, it is assumed that numerous villages existed. Most of them seemed to have been in the eastern high plane of the island, and thus it is assumed that they lived on animal husbandry. Numerous simple fortifications, mostly built using dry stone constructions, indicate that the population was expecting to defend itself against attacks.

In the 4th century BCE Greek colonisation spread over many Adriatic islands and along the coast, but none of them have been found on Brač. In Škrip, traditionally known as the oldest existing settlement on the island, old walls have been found built in the Greek style, but it would be the only Greek colony which has been built inland instead along the coast, which is why it is unlikely to be a Greek colony. It remains an open question whether Brač had any organised Greek colonies, and if it did not, why. Nevertheless, Greeks visited the island and also traded with the Illyrian inhabitants. The toponomy of two of the southern bays still preserve the memory of such a trade: Farska (Hvarska in modern Croatian, referring to the old colony of Pharos on Hvar) and Garška (Grčka in modern Croatian, meaning Greek).

Brač lay on the crossroads of several trade routes from Salona (today Solin) to Issa (today Vis) and the Po River. Greek artifacts were found in the bay of Vičja near Ložišća on the estate of the Rakela-Bugre brothers. Many of the objects belonging to this still unexamined site are now on display in the Split Archaeological Museum.

=== Roman era (3rd century BCE-8th century CE) ===
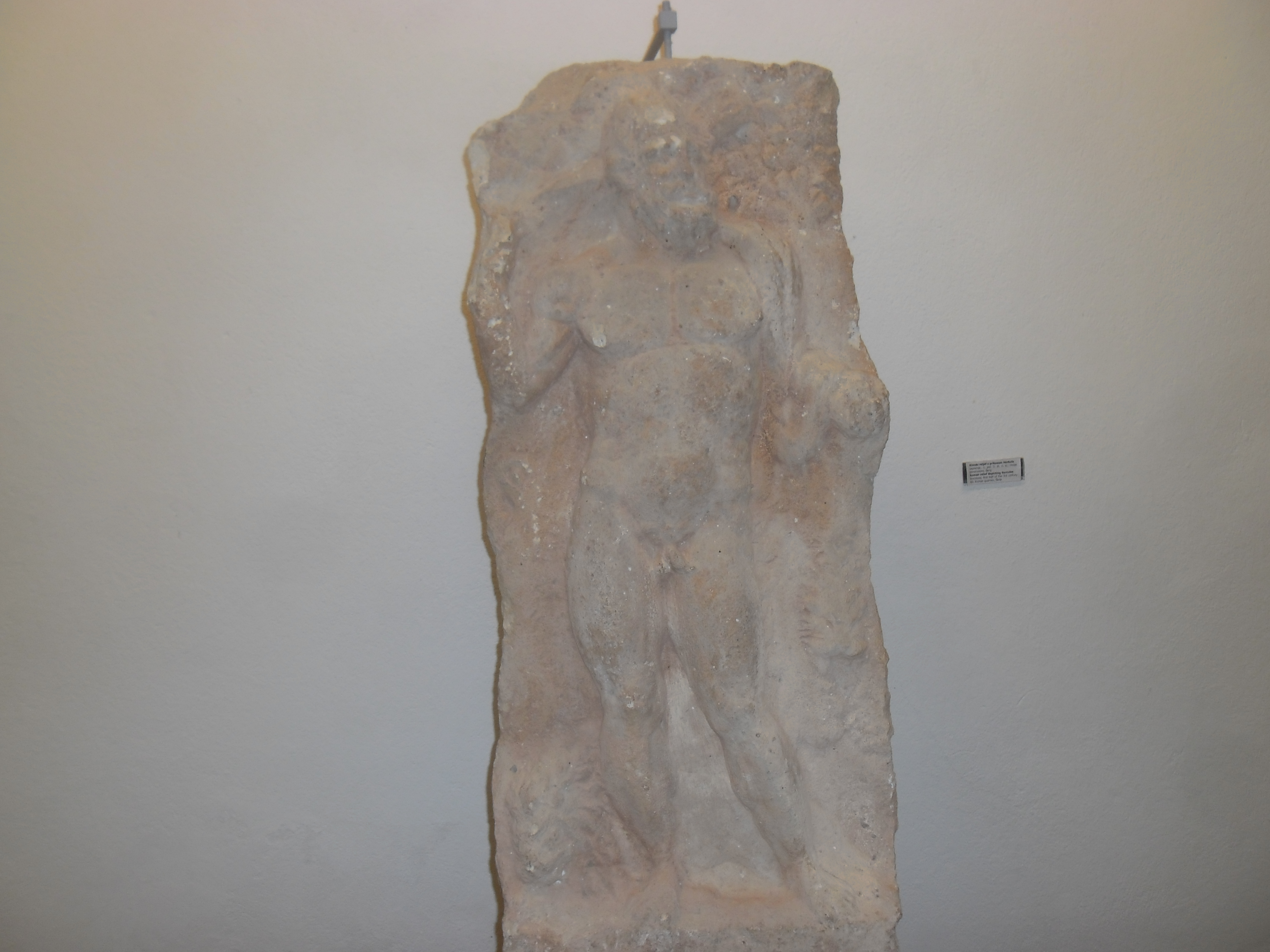
Heracles relief, now in the Brač island museum in Škrip

Increased attacks from Illyrians on Greek colonies such as Pharos on neighbouring island Hvar and Roman trade routes lead to a time of upheaval and change that started with the Illyro-Roman Wars in 229 BCE and the establishment of a Roman protectorate covering the surrounding Greek colonies. Over the years, the area increasingly fell under Roman rule, with the establishment of the provinces of Illyricum and Dalmatia 32-27 BCE, including Brač. More peaceful times finally began after 9 CE, following the end of the Great Illyrian uprising.

Salona became the capital of the new Dalmatia province and, probably because of its proximity to Salona, Romans increased their usage of the island. Signs of Roman habitation are widespread, but they usually are limited to single Roman villas, cisterns, and either near early quarries between Škrip and Splitska or near vineyards and olive orchards. Splitska became the most important harbour to carry stone to Salona and the whole of Dalmatia. It is likely that slaves had to work in the quarries, originally prisoners of wars, but later often from the local population. From 295 to 305 CE, Diocletian's Palace in Split was largely built with limestone that was quarried on Brač. Also agriculture, especially wine and olives, began in the same era. But no larger town or municipality on Brač that was inhabited in the Roman era is known today.

Roman walls, villas, sarcophagi, cisterns, and tools for making wine, olive oil, and keeping sheep and goats have been found in or near a number of today's coastal towns, such as Bol, Pučišća, Povlja, Supetar, Novo Selo, and the Lovrečina bay. In the inland, particularly around Nerežišća, Škrip, Donji Humac, and Dračevica, wine, olives, and figs, as well as sheep and goats were grown. Near Škrip, inscriptions praising the god Liber have been found, near Donji Humac sarcophagi, and near Dračevica coins. Pliny the Elder mentions Brač as for its famous goats in his Naturalis Historia. Numerous water reservoirs (lokva) date to that time, and are still in use.

Some of the artefacts from the early time of Roman rule are devoted to numerous gods from a diverse set of pantheons, most frequently Heracles. Other divine beings for whom devotional objects have been found include Mithra, Jupiter, Jupiter Dolichenus as a form of worship for Baal, Mercury, Neptune, Silvanus, Pan, the Muses, and Liber. Christianity seemed to have arrived on the island only after Constantine's declaration of the Edict of Milan: old Christian churches from the fifth and early sixth century are known in Sutivan, the bay of Lovrečina, Saint Andrew (Sveti Jadre) above Splitska, and Saint Theodore (Sveti Tudor) near Nerežišća. No pagan artefacts date newer than the arrival of Christianity on the island.

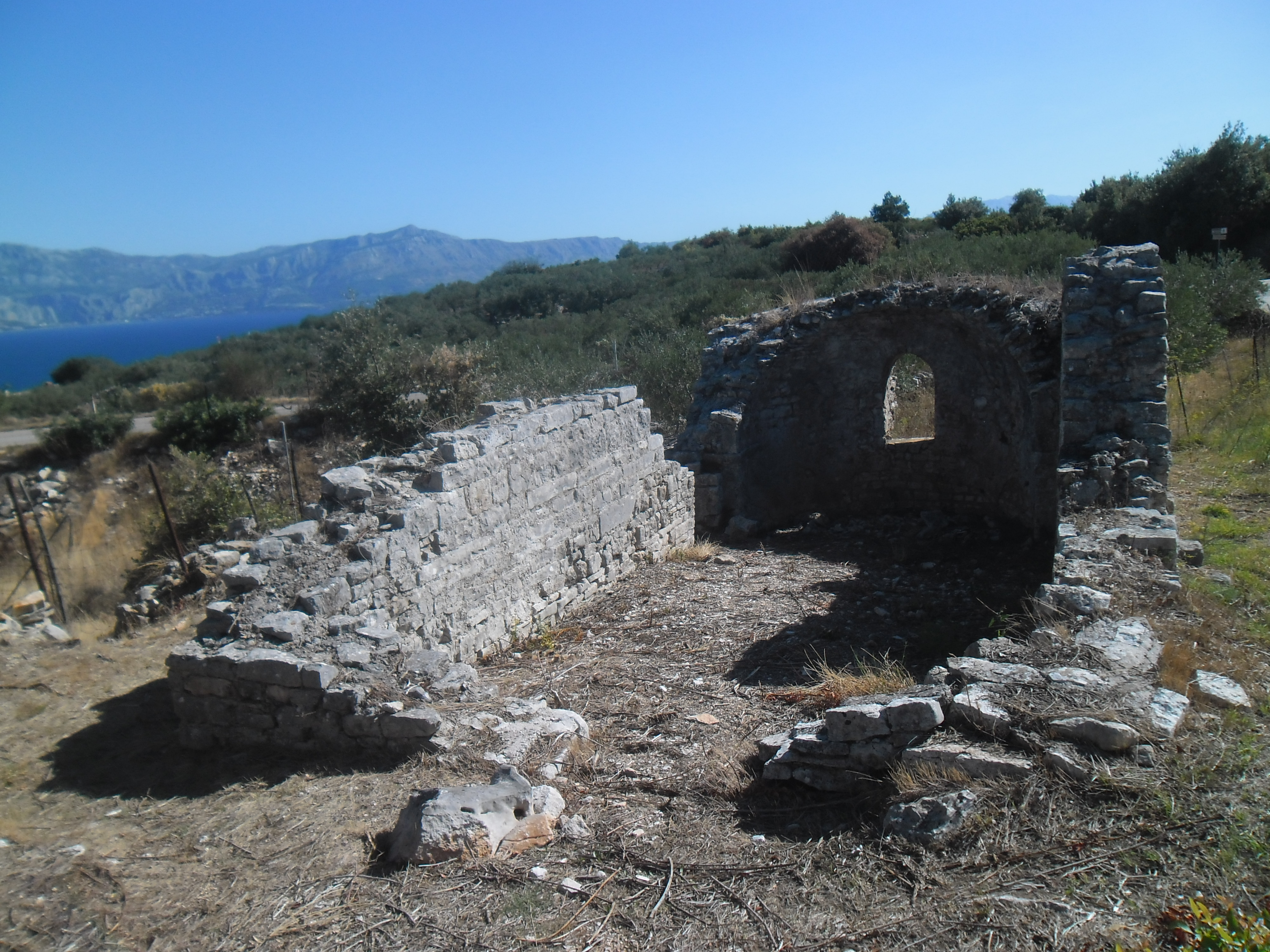
Ruins of the fifth century church of Sv. Jadre (Saint Andrew) near Škrip

When the Roman empire split in 395 CE, Brač became a part of the Western Roman empire as part of Dalmatia. Roman rule over Brač and Dalmatia survived the Fall of the Western Roman Empire in 476 CE to the Gothic invasion, as emperor Nepos fled to Dalmatia. The Goths conquered Dalmatia after Nepos' assassination in 480 CE.

Gothic rule extended until 555, when Eastern Roman rule over Dalmatia and Brač was restored by Justinian.

The Pannonian Avars sacked and destroyed Salona in 614 (or 639, according to other sources) and Brač became a refuge. The Dalmatian region and its shores were at this time settled by tribes of Croats, a South Slavic people subservient to the Avar khagans, but the Salonans fled to Split, Brač and other islands. Tradition has it that Škrip was founded by refugee Salonans, but the town is actually older than that.

Split and other Dalmatian city-states, together with Brač and other islands, became the remnants of the Roman province of Dalmatia. First, they recognised the rule of the Exarchate of Ravenna, but after the end of the Exarchate due to the Lombards, it became the predecessor to the Theme of Dalmatia, an independent unit recognising the supremacy of the Byzantine empire. Byzantine gold coins have been found near Nerežišća indicating Byzantine rule. This lasted through most of the seventh and eight century.

=== Arrival of the Slavs (9th and 10th century) ===
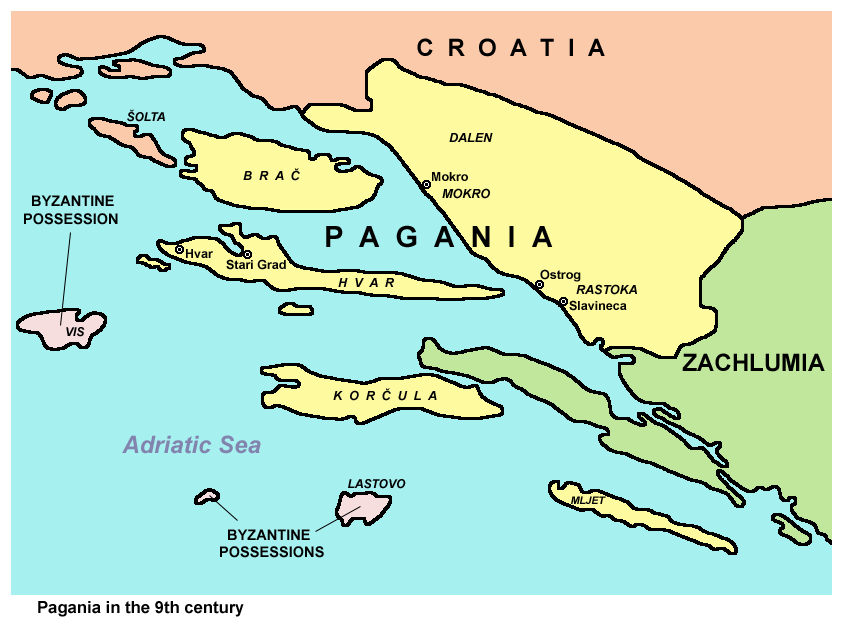
Pagania (Nerantia) in the 9th century

On the mainland, the South Slavic tribe of the Narentines had founded its own state in the seventh century. Sometime during the eighth or ninth century, the Narentines landed either in harbours near Selca on the east of Brač, or first went through Hvar and then landed on the Hrvaska bay (Hrvatska, Croatian bay) in the south-west of Brač. This is still noticeable in a lot of toponyms and even in the different dialects on the island, where the western part of the island retains many of the Roman elements, but the eastern part is more Slavic. By the ninth century, the Narentines had a solid rule over Brač. Brač and Hvar and surrounding islands were called the Narentine islands or Maronia. The Narentines, also known as Paganians, were not Christian, bringing a pagan population back to Brač. The Nerantines used Brač mostly for animal husbandry.

The likely administrative and political centre of Brač for the Narentines was Gradac, which is located between Gornji Humac and Selca on the Eastern plateau of Brač, and which was likely founded by Narentines shortly after their arrival. Today, only ruins are left of Gradac.

At the turn of the eighth to the ninth century, Charlemagne attacked and conquered much of Dalmatia, but not Brač or the other Narentine islands. Charlemagne returned Dalmatia to the Byzantine empire in 812 during the negotiations for the Pax Nicephori.

The Narentines were frequently attacking Venetian ships. In 837, the Venetian Doge Pietro Tradonico came first to Split, and then to Brač and Hvar to find a way to stop the attacks, first with force, and then with diplomacy. In 839, Venice signed a treaty with the Narentine knez (duke) Družko (Drosaico), which was broken within a year.

In 872, Saracene (Arab) raiders from Crete attacked Brač. It is unclear what exactly they attacked, as the sources speaks of a "urbs Braciensem". Given that there still was no proper city, it may refer to the Vidova Gora as the highest point of the island, and thus to the area around today's Bol, or it might be a literal translation of Gradac.

Following the Christianisation of the Narentines in 878–880, Christianity on Brač got a new boost. Particularly the Benedictines started to become a dominant influence for the islands sacral life. Andrija Ciccarelli mentions seven monasteries on the island: St Mary (Sv Marija) in Postira, Mirje na Brigu near Postira, St Lawrence (Sv Lovro) in the Lovrečina bay, St Stephen (Sv Stipan) in Stipanska luka (Stephen's harbour) in today's Pučišća, St Andrew (Sv Jadre) near Nerežišća, and one in Povlja (likely St John the Baptist, Sv Ivan Krstitelj) and near Murvica (possibly the Dragon's cave, Drakonjina špilja).A number of old Croatian churches were built during the ninth to the twelfth century: St Nicholas (Sv Nikola) above Selca, St Michael (Sv Mihovil) above Dol, St Elias (Sv Ilija) near Donji Humac, St George (Sv Juraj) near Nerežišća, St Clement (Sv Kliment) near Pražnica, St John and Theodore (Sv Ivan i Teodor) in Bol, St George (Sv Juraj) in Straževnik, St Cosmas and Damian (Sv Kuzma i Damjan) above Smrčevik, Holy Sunday (Sv Nedija) above Gradac, All Saints (Svi Sveti) near Gornji Humac belonging to the village of Mošuja and Dubravica.

Dujam Hranković lists a number of old Croatian towns on the eastern plateau of Brač, which do not exist today anymore: Gradac, Mošuje and Dubravica, Straževnik, Pothume, and Podgračišće. The houses of that time usually had one single, rectangular room, were built with dry wall construction, with the door facing south. They often feature the tools necessary for animal husbandry, have a cistern, a fireplace, an oven, olive mills, wine presses, and wheat grinder.

Around 923, Tomislav of Croatia, Byzantine Emperor Constantine VII and the two church patriarchs were involved a deal that transferred the control of the Byzantine Dalmatian cities to the new Croatian kingdom, which according to Vrsalović included Brač. But following Tomislav's death, Croatia weakened, and in the 940s, the islands of Brač and Hvar seceded during Ban Pribina's rebellion and rejoined the Narentine state.

=== The end of Byzantine claim (1000-1186) ===
In 1000 CE, the Venetian doge Pietro II Orseolo decided to finally pacify Dalmatia and the Narentines. Venice conquered Brač in the same year, and according to the Brač chronicler Andrea Ciccarelli, they immediately built a palace in Nerežišća to serve as a court, for administration, as an archive, and for council meetings. This moved the centre of power from the Slavic Gradac in the east of the island to the Roman Nerežišća. Nerežišća remained the administrative centre of the island for more than eight centuries, until 1823 when the Austro-Hungarian empire moved it to Supetar.

Doge Pietro II Orseolo also received Stephen as a hostage, the son of the Croatian king Svetoslav Suronja. Stephen later married the daughter of the Doge, Joscella Orseolo. Their son Peter followed Stephen to become King of Croatia in 1058, as Peter Krešimir IV. Early in his reign, Peter expanded Croatia to its largest extend, also including Brač and the other islands.

An attack by Normans from the south of Italy in 1075 lead to the capture of a number of Dalmatian cities and islands, including Brač. The Normans were invited by the Dalmatian cities in order to protect them from Croatian influence. Venice attacked and conquered the Norman possessions in 1076.

In 1102, Coloman, King of Hungary unified the crown of Hungary with the crown of Croatia. The Life of St Christopher the Martyr says that a Hungarian fleet subjugated several Dalmatian islands, including Brač. In 1107, emperor Alexios I gave the Dalmatian theme, including Brač, to Coloman to administer in the name of the Byzantine empire. The fleet of Venice, commanded by Doge Ordelafo Faliero, invaded Dalmatia in August 1115 and retook the islands. In an attack in either 1117 or 1118, during which Doge Ordelafo Faliero himself died, the Hungarians retook Dalmatia. The new doge, Domenico Michele, invaded and reconquered Dalmatia. In 1124, Stephen II of Hungary invaded Dalmatia, but were reconquered by Venetia soon after. Either Stephen II's son Béla II in 1136, but latest his son Géza II in 1142, again regained sovereignty over Split and other parts of Dalmatia for Hungary.

In the 1140s, Split was under Hungarian control, and Brač and Hvar were under Venetian control, probably recently conquered. Venice asked the Catholic church to establish Brač and Hvar as its own diocese and take it off from Split and thus Hungarian control. Venice further arranged for the diocese of Zadar (which was under Venetian control) to be raised to an archdiocese, and for the newly formed diocese of the islands to be subject to Zadar. In 1147, Brač and Hvar elected Marin Manzavin from Zadar to become the first Bishop of Hvar, and they chased archpriest Cernat from Split off the island. Soon after a palace in Bol was available for the Bishop, where he could reside when he was on Brač. The leader of the church of Brač was the archpriest in Nerežišća, elected by the priests of the island's parishes and confirmed by the bishop in Hvar.

In 1145, pirates from Omiš under the Kačić family attacked Brač for the first time. This seems to be a continuation of the pirate attacks of the Narentines, who were located in the same area. The attack robbed the Benedictine abbey in Povlja, and killed the monks. In the following decades, the attacks by Omiš pirates would increase in frequency, suppressing any development of towns along the coast of Brač.

In 1164, Byzantine emperor Manuel I Komnenos started a war against King Stephen III of Hungary and succeeds in gaining control over Dalmatia, letting Venice administer the area. Counterattacks by Stephen are withouts success. Only after the death of emperor Manuel I in 1180, Stephen's brother and successor as King of Hungary, Béla III, was able to take control of Dalmatia again, seemingly without bloodshed and with support of Byzantine authorities, who seemed to now prefer Hungarian over Venetian rule. A peace treaty was signed in 1186 between Béla III and emperor Isaac II Angelos, which led to the empire formally giving up its claim over Dalmatia.

A document from 1184 survived as a copy, the Charter of Povlja written in 1250. This is one of the oldest Croatian linguistic records. It discusses some landownership of the Benedictine monaster of St John in Povlja. It mentions the roles of the knez (lord or prince) of Brač (a certain Brečko), the župan (administrative head, elder), a judge, and bailiffs. Vrsalović thinks it likely that this administrative structure is rooted already in Narentine times and had endured and evolved throughout the many changes and conquests of the island. The island was never rich or strategically interesting enough to justify serious intervention. When the ruler of the island changed, the new rulers often simply confirmed the statutes of Brač and the freedoms and rights of the islanders. Sometimes they even negotiated for more rights. The fact that the document was written in Croatian, and not in Latin or Hungarian, is also a testament to the autonomy of the island, which was developed independently and peacefully despite the wars waged by Hungary, Venice, and Byzantium.

=== Hungarian rule 1180s-1278 ===
With Béla III controlling Zadar, Split, Hvar and Brač, the Archbishop of Split intervened with the Pope for the Diocese of Hvar and Brač to be moved from Zadar to Split. The Papal legate Thebaldus ruled in 1181 in favour of Split, but Zadar didn't want to give up so lightly. After the death of the first bishop Martin Manzavin, the islands elected his nephew Nicolas as the new bishop, but the Metropolitan of Split didn't confirm Nicloas. Nicolas went to Verona to Pope Lucius III, who confirmed him directly. Pope Celestine III decided with a papal bull in 1192 that the diocese of Hvar should be subject to the Archdiocese of Split. Nicolas remained Bishop of Hvar until 1198, when he assumed the vacant Archbishopry in Zadar, against the will of Pope Innocence III, for which Nicolas was suspended.>

In 1217, Béla's son and, King Andrew II of Hungary, landed the southern side of Brač near today's Bol on his way to the Fifth Crusade. He was greeted by the Lord of Brač (knez), representatives of the Brač council, and the Bishop of Hvar.

In the meantime, the pirate attacks from the Omiš' Kačić family became worse. In 1220, Brač pleaded for help from King Andrew II. The king answered with an order to knez Malduč Kačić to cease the attacks, threatening his whole family. In 1221, Pope Honorius III sent legate Aconcius to prevent piracy, and in 1222, the pope sought help from residents of Dubrovnik against the Omiš pirates.

In 1221, King Andrew II gifts the islands of Brač, Hvar, Korčula, and Lastovo to Henry and Servidon Frankopan in recognition for their services. It is unclear in what way and for how long they enjoyed their gift, but before 1240 Brač had elected Osor Kačić as their new knez (Lord), and on neighbouring Hvar had his brother Pribislav as knez. Brač and Hvar hoped that by having the sons of knez Malduč Kačić rule over the island, the pirate attacks would cease. But Osor didn't accept the statutes of Brač, but he demanded full control of the island. The people of Brač started conspiring with Garganus, the potestas of Split, and promised him that a person from Split would become the new knez if Split helped Brač against Osor Kačić. In 1240, Split starts a war against Omiš, and although the attack on Omiš is without success, they manage to capture Brač. On May 19, 1240, Brač formally recognises the Split rule.

This did not last long. The son and successor of Andrew II, King Béla IV, had to flee from his capital when Mongols attacked Hungary. Kadan, a son of Great Khan Ögödei, chased Béla from town to town in Dalmatia. Béla took refugee in Split, but was unhappy with his welcome in the city, and then left for the well-fortified Trogir. Before Kadan laid siege to Trogir in March, news arrived of the Great Khan's death. Batu Khan wanted to attend at the election of Ögödei's successor with sufficient troops and ordered the withdrawal of all Mongol forces. Béla, who was grateful to Trogir, granted it lands near Split, causing a lasting conflict between the two Dalmatian towns, and also took Brač away from Split and granted it to Hvar on May 10, 1242.

The quarrel between Split and Trogir escalated to an armed conflict in 1244, and Brač, indebted to Split for the help against Osor Kačić, joined Split. Eventually, Trogir won that conflict, and on March 3, 1253, they signed a peace treaty and had to pay 100 lira to Trogir.

One night in July 1277, Omiš pirates landed in the bay of St George (Sv Juraj) on the northern side of the island, and proceeded all the way to Nerežišća. There they laid fire to the buildings of the Brač administration. This also destroyed the archives of the island, so that most of the early documentation about the history of Brač was lost.

=== Venetian rule 1278-1358 ===
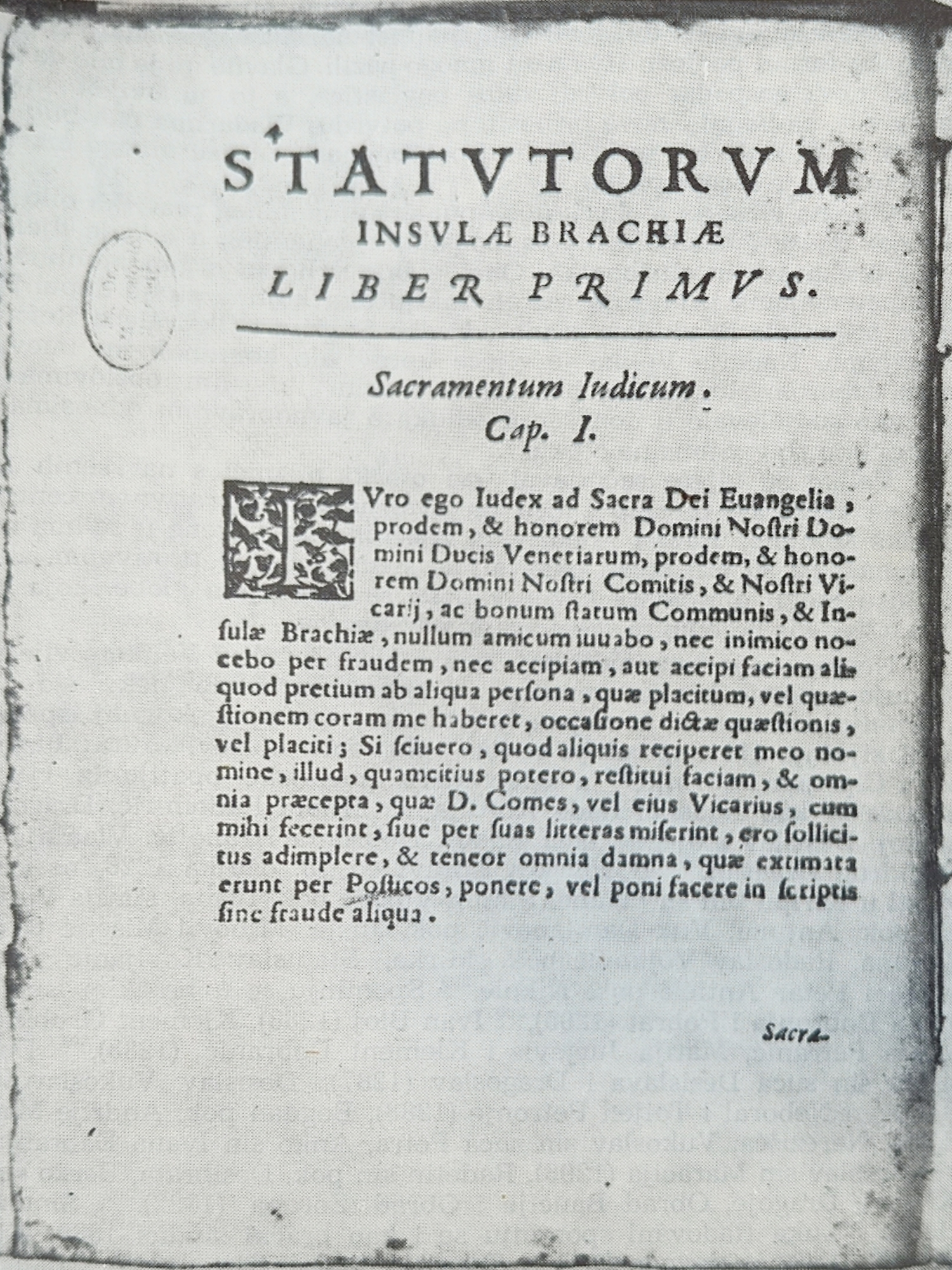
Statutes of Brač

Following this attack, and the obvious inability of the Hungarian king to stop the incessant pirate attacks, the people of Brač and Hvar sent Šimun (Simon), Bishop of Hvar and Brač, to Venice to negotiate that the two islands would come under the supremacy of Venice, in return for protection. On April 1, 1278, the Great council of Venice votes to accept the plea. Venetian administration took over on July 21, 1278, with the knez being appointed by Venice, originally for four years, but that was shortened to two years after the term of the first Venetian expired in 1282.

Venice took the task of protecting Brač more serious. In 1280 they attacked and conquered Omiš itself, in order to stop the attacks, but the pirates managed to flee from the Venetians, and continued their attacks on Brač, Hvar, and now Omiš itself as well. In 1282, one armed ship with eighty oars was assigned to Brač and Hvar. But the attacks continued, and Venice ordered on September 22, 1292, that Nerežišća, as the administrative capital, should be fortified with a wall, but that never happened. In 1294, another devastating attack on the monastery in Povlja happened.

Due to the 1277 attack on and fire in Nerežišća, Brač was left without a written form of its statutes (laws). On bequest of the Brač nobility, knez Marino Falerio (who later became Doge of Venice) ordered in 1305 for the statutes of Brač to be rewritten. Copies of the statutes are preserved.

As the Venetian rule didn't lead to the peace that Brač hoped for, Brač stopped recognising knez Giovanni Soranzo (who later became Doge of Venice) in 1309, and thus Venetian supremacy. Venice orders the knez of Zadar and the knez of Dubrovnik to come to the help to the knez of Brač, which leads to a proper uprising in 1310 under the lead of the family Slavogost and with help from Omiš. Juraj Slavogost is elected as captain by the nobility of Brač, whereas Venice sends Andrea Goro as the new knez. Goro and his troops manage to capture Slavogost, and send him to Venice, thus retaining the islands under Venetian control.

In 1317, Venice gives to more ships to Brač and Hvar, one with thirty oars, the other with seventy to eighty oars. In 1334, another ship with eighty oars is given, another in 1346. The pirate attacks could not be stopped, and in the second half of the fourteenth century the monastery in Povlja was abandoned.

Brač lived on agriculture and animal husbandry, forestry, stone quarrying, and trade with the nearby islands and coastal towns. Wheat and lentils were scarce, and there was not enough of it to feed the population of the island. Therefore, their export was prohibited. Agricultural produce included wheat, oat, olives, figs, pears, apples, walnuts, mulberries, and other fruits. Animal husbandry focused mostly on sheep and goats, but also a few cows and bulls, mules, and donkeys. In order to help with having enough water, artificial pools (called lokva in Croatian, lacus clausus in Latin) were created, mostly in the eastern plateau. Around the end of the 14th and early in the 15th century, beekeeping also started to develop. Fishery was not developed, mostly due to the pirate situation.

=== Hungarian rule 1358-1420 ===
In 1356, King Louis I of Hungary marched against Dalmatia, and he quickly conquered many towns and islands. With the Treaty of Zadar on February 18, 1358, Brač returned under Hungarian rule.

Louis names Jakov de Cessani to be new knez of Brač and Hvar, adding Korčula to his possessions in 1362. The territories of the knez grow in the following decades, and the individual islands, including Brač, get a vikar to administer them locally. The knez is usually also a Hungarian admiral. Split immediately asked for Brač to become a part of Split, but the Ban of Croatia did not accept the request.

The oldest mention of the plague reaching Brač is from 1360, but on this first time it was stopped swiftly. It would return to Brač repeatedly, often doing considerable damage. In the same year, the island also suffered a large swarm of locusts, fortunately after the harvest.

With the successors of King Louis I, Hungary weakened. King Tvrtko I of Bosnia used that weakness, attacked King Sigismund of Hungary in Croatia and Dalmatia in 1389, and in 1390, together with the whole region, Brač accepted Bosnian rule. Three members of the Brač nobility, Juraj Dujmov, Nikša Petruli, and Miajlo Baloj, traveled to the court of King Tvrtko in Kraljeva Sutjeska to ask him to confirm the rights and statutes of Brač, which he did on September 23, 1390. Tvrtko died in the following year, in 1391, and his brother and successor, King Stephen Dabiša was forced to give up the claims over Croatia and Dalmatia back to King Sigismund of Hungary in 1393.

In 1403, Ladislaus of Naples attacked and conquered Zadar and was crowned King of Hungary on August 5, 1403. His rule did not extend beyond some parts of Dalmatia. A delegation from Brač, Nikša Petruli and Mihovil Baloević, traveled to Zadar in order to get the statute of Brač confirmed, which King Ladislaus did on August 14, 1403. He gifted the island to Alviz and Guidona de Matafaris, and he returned to Naples the same year. Before he left, he raised Hrvoje Vukčić Hrvatinić as the Duke of Split and his deputy for Dalmatia, including Brač.

For 1405, Dujam Hranković lists in the chronicle "Opis otoka Brača" (Description of the island Brač) the following settlements: in the East, Gornji Humac, Straževnik, Podhume, Mošuljica, Dubravica, Gradac, and Podgračišće (of which only one, Gornji Humac, still survived to the seventeenth century); in the centre Pražnice and Dol, and in the West Donji Humac, Nerežišća, and Škrip (of which all settlements survived). Other settlements were left before 1405 mostly due to pirate attacks, which includes the abbey in Povlja, Stipanska luka and Dolac in today's Pučišća, Bol and the buildings of the bishop, and Rasohatica on the South. The chronicle states that the island has a population of about 6,000.

In 1408, after King Sigismund managed to beat the Bosnian army, Hrvoje allies with Sigismund and so retains control over Dalmatia. Ladislaus then sells Brač and all of Dalmatia to Venice for 100,000 Ducats on September 9, 1409, but the power over Dalmatia remains with Duke Hrvoje and thus King Sigismund. On June 17, 1413, King Sigismund removes the islands, including Brač, from the control of Duke Hrvoje and gives them to the Republic of Dubrovnik, to administer them in his name. King Sigismund informs the people of Brač on June 25, 1414, about the new, temporary arrangement. Split also wanted to get Brač, and offered King Sigismund two galleys, but the King preferred Dubrovnik's offer of 200 ducats every year.

=== Venetian rule 1420-1797 ===
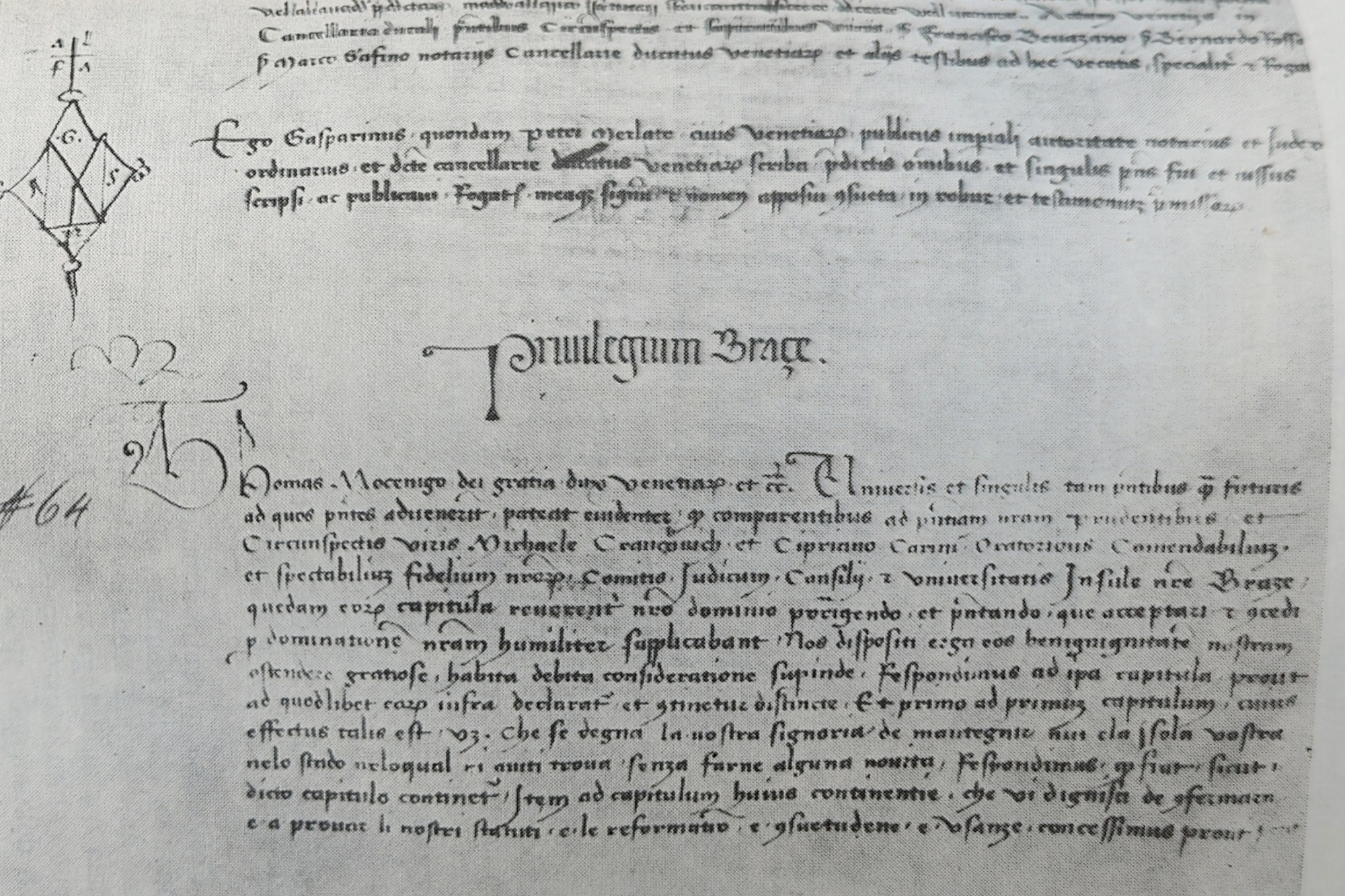
Treaty between Brač and the Venetian republic, where Venice recognized the statutes of Brač (privilegium Braçe) and Brač the supremacy of Venice, November 22, 1420

Venice still aimed to make good on the sale of Dalmatia by Ladislaus of Naples. When King Sigismund of Hungary became busy with the Turkish attacks and internal Hungarian strife, Venice sent captain-general Pietro Loredan to conquer Dalmatia. Brač was conquered in August 1420, and on November 22, 1420, doge Tommaso Mocenigo of Venice confirmed the statutes of Brač to the supplicants. This did not stop the ongoing attacks on Brač from Omiš, so that a representation from Brač demanded protection from doge Francesco Foscari, but the attacks from Omiš and Makarska would not be stop until the Kačić family of Omiš sought to become vassals themselves of Venice in 1452. Only with the end of the incessant attacks, people started settling on the coast.

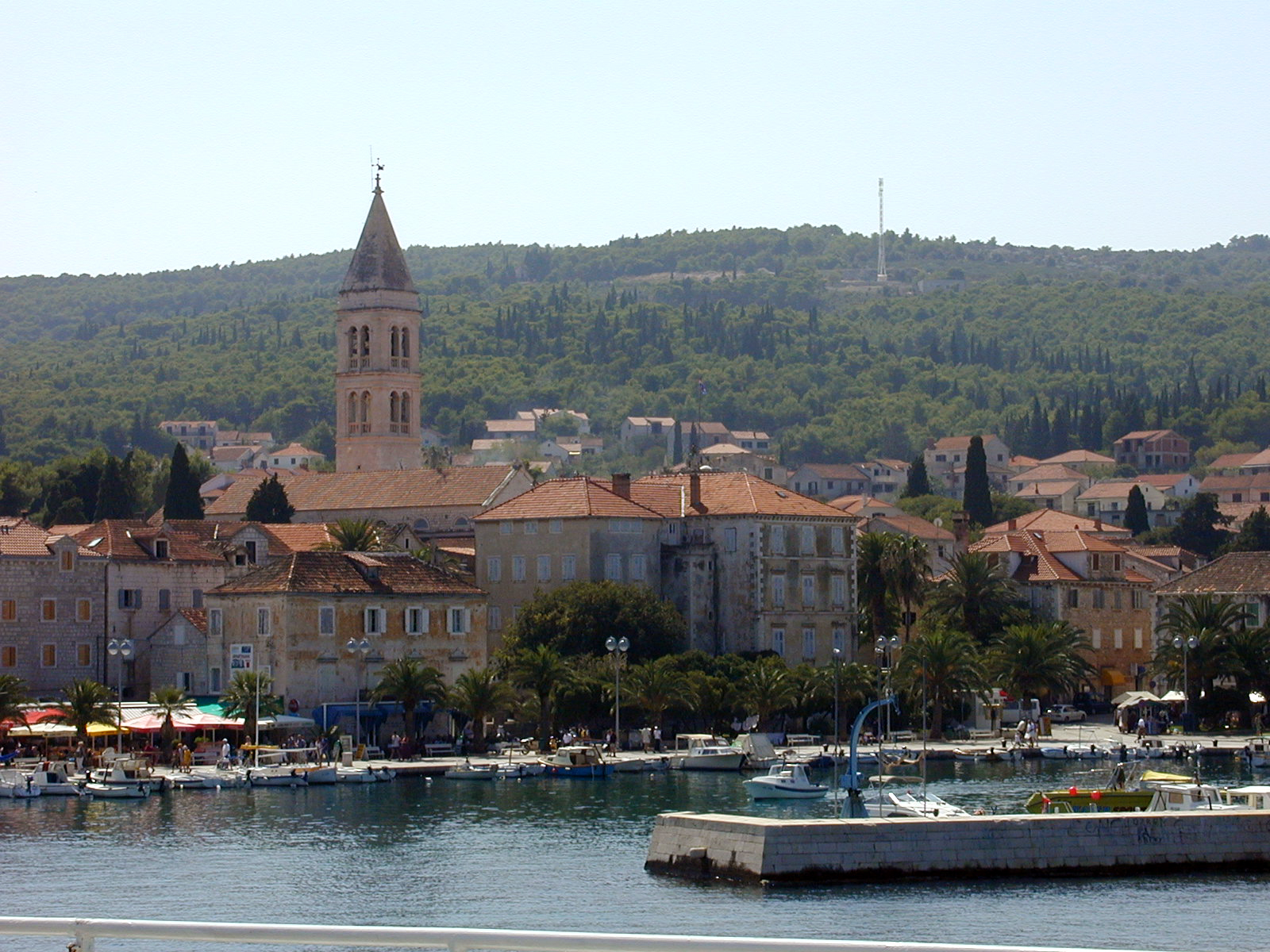
Supetar harbour

The Black Death hit Brač 1425-1427 and then again 1434–1436. For 1405, Hranković mentions in his chronicles that Brač has a population of 6,000 - but after the pandemic, only 2,000 people were still living on the island.

After the Ottoman Empire conquered Bosnia and the death of King Stephen II in 1463, the Bosnian vojvod Ivan and Vladislav Hercegović were fleeing from the Ottomans. They asked Venice for Brač, but the Venetian Senate declined and instead gave them a house in Split and an annual income of 200 Ducats.

Over the coming decades, Brač was recognized by the Venetian doges for the military help they offered to cities such as Split and Omiš, who were under attack by the Ottomans, despite being so poor. Doge Leonardo Loredan mentions in 1511 that Brač sent 22 ships and 400 fighting men to help Split. In 1535 though, the council of nobles in Nerežišća elected Trifo Martinić to represent the island in front of the Venetian Senate and decline their request to build ships, due to the latest bouts of the plague that lead to a large loss of life on the island. In 1536, a campaign of uskoks led by Petar Kružić also looted on Brač.

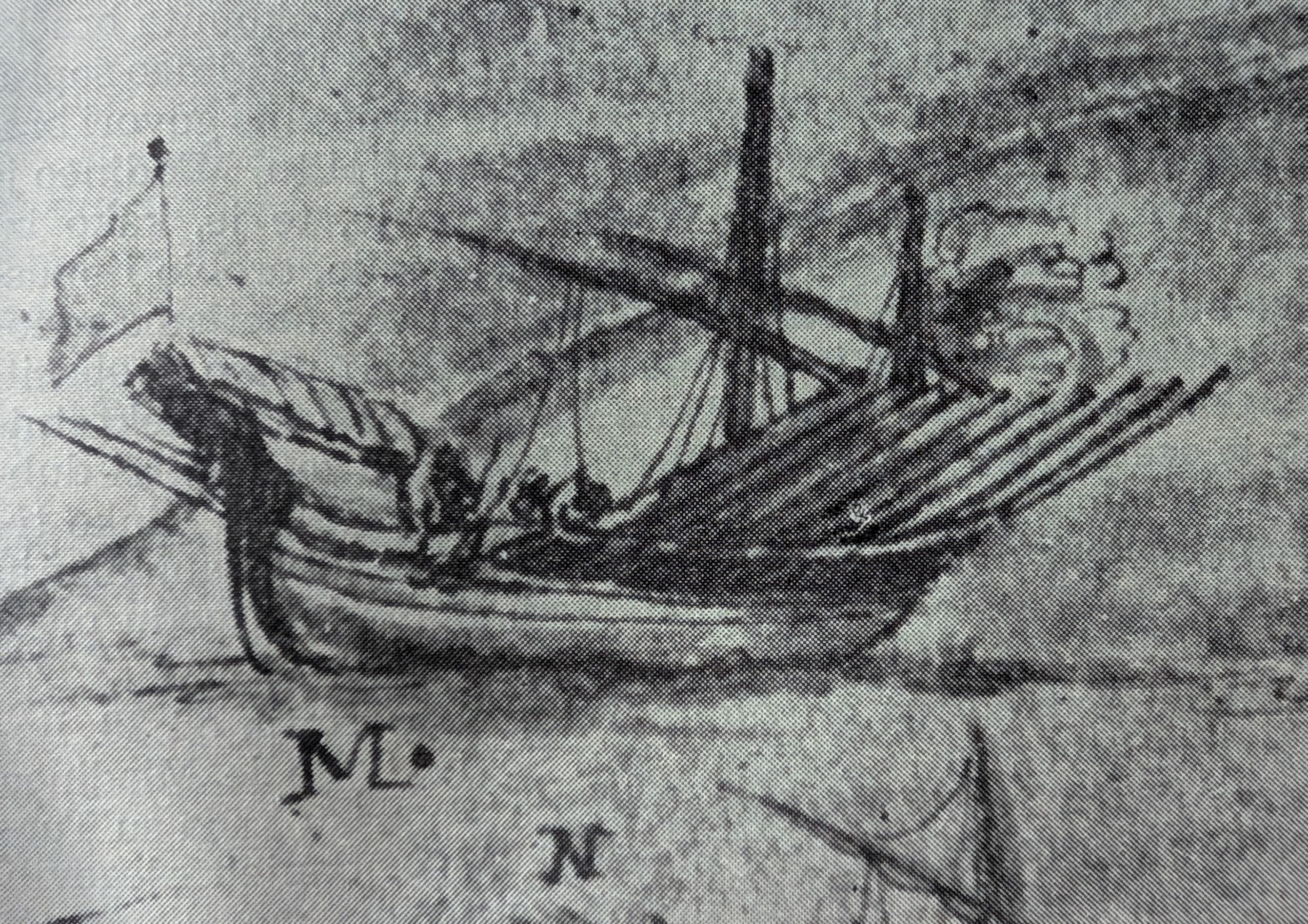
Galley Brazzana (detail from a map by Giuseppe Santini, 1666)

On 17 March 1538, under the leadership of knez Vittorio Michaeli, the great council of Brač unanimously pleaded to Venice to be allowed to have and arm its own galley (within the Venetian fleet), which they would man themselves and pay for the upkeep. The request was approved. At the Riva degli Schiavoni in Venice, a landing place for the new Galea Brazzana was defined, where to this day the name is inscribed in stone. 200 rowers were needed to man the galley. The galley were several ships, under an ongoing Venetian commission. One shipwreck of the Brač galley was already mentioned for 11 February 1489 under sopracomitos (captain) Rafael Filippi.

Fewer attacks on the island itself allowed finally for the coast of Brač to be settled. This was sped up by the new settlements sympathising with the uskoks and further reducing attacks. Later the growth was further encouraged by the Venetian doges, who gave nobel refugees, such as the Čikarelović-Kukretić family (who later renamed Ciccarelli), money and tax relief. The Venetian representatives reported in the 1550s, that Brač had twelve settlements, none of them fortified, and all inland. Six of them (Nerežišće as the main village, as well as Donji Humac, Dol, Pražnice, Mošulje and Gradac) had their own judge. They list 21 bays, and say that seven of them had a few houses. These become the seeds for the future settlements Bol, Sutivan, Supetar, Splitska, Postira, Pučišća, and Povlja. A Venetian report from 1579 lists all of these as settlements (Bol with a population of more than 400 even), but neglects to list Straževnik, Mošuje, Dubravac, Gradac, and Podgračišće, which we can assume have been abandoned by then. Today, only ruins of those can be found on the eastern plateau of the island.

On 18 April 1596, Juraj Lenković, general of the Croatian Krajina, pleaded pope Clement VIII to send him relief troops from Postira and Sutivan on Brač, in order to help them fight for Klis against the Turkish occupation. 80 uskoks from Brač joined the attack on Klis against the wishes of Venice, who were aiming to have a peace with the Turks. They could not hold the fortress long. A reserve of 300 uskoks was kept on Brač afterwards, who in turn now were attacking Turkish positions into the early 1600s, before a peace between Venice and Turks has been achieved.

The peace held until the War of Candia. Refugees from the Makarska area and from Bosnia and Hercegovina settled particularly on the Eastern part of Brač. Already in 1645, a number of families founded Vrhbrač, near the ruins of a small church of St. Martin. Vrhbrač was later called Sumartin. Although the older families complained about the refugees, the Venetian administration protected them and gave them privileges, in the hope that they would provide soldiers in their ongoing war with the Turks. The new settlers were usually dealing directly with the Venetian administration instead of the Brač council. But Venetian mismanagement and corruption have left the island even poorer than usual. A Venetian request in 1667 for 70 soldiers could only be partially fulfilled with 40 soldiers. The privileges of the new settlers were upheld until the French reign more than a hundred years later.

From 1643 to 1648, the galley Brač was led by elected sopracomitos (captain) Juraj Mladineo. According to report by Superintendent General for Dalmatia and Albania Tommaso Contarini from 28 June 1647, Mladineo defended Split in three battles against the Turks in 1647. Mladineo asked for his five-year term to be prolonged, and doge Francesco Molin approved that request in 1648. Mladineo died in 1651, and the doge wrote to knez Christofor da Canli to ask the great council to elect a new sopracomitos. Mladineo's successor was Šimun Božičević-Nadali until 1657, followed by Ivan Vusio from 1658 to 1663.

According to Superintendent General for Dalmatia and Albania Girolamo Corner, Brač had a population of 5222 in 1682 (1688 men, 2040 women, 890 boys and 604 girls).

Venice used the internal struggles between the old and new families, between the noble families and the peasants, to their advantage. Brač didn't develop, but became poorer and less populated. Doge Marco Foscarini wrote in 1762/3 that one more decade of such an administration, and the knez will not administer people, but just some ruins and stones. The main town Nerežišća, as most of the inland towns, have lost a lot of people.

In 1796, just before the fall of Venice, the population of Brač has reached 10,988 people—close to the number in modern times.

=== Austria-Hungary 1797-1918 ===
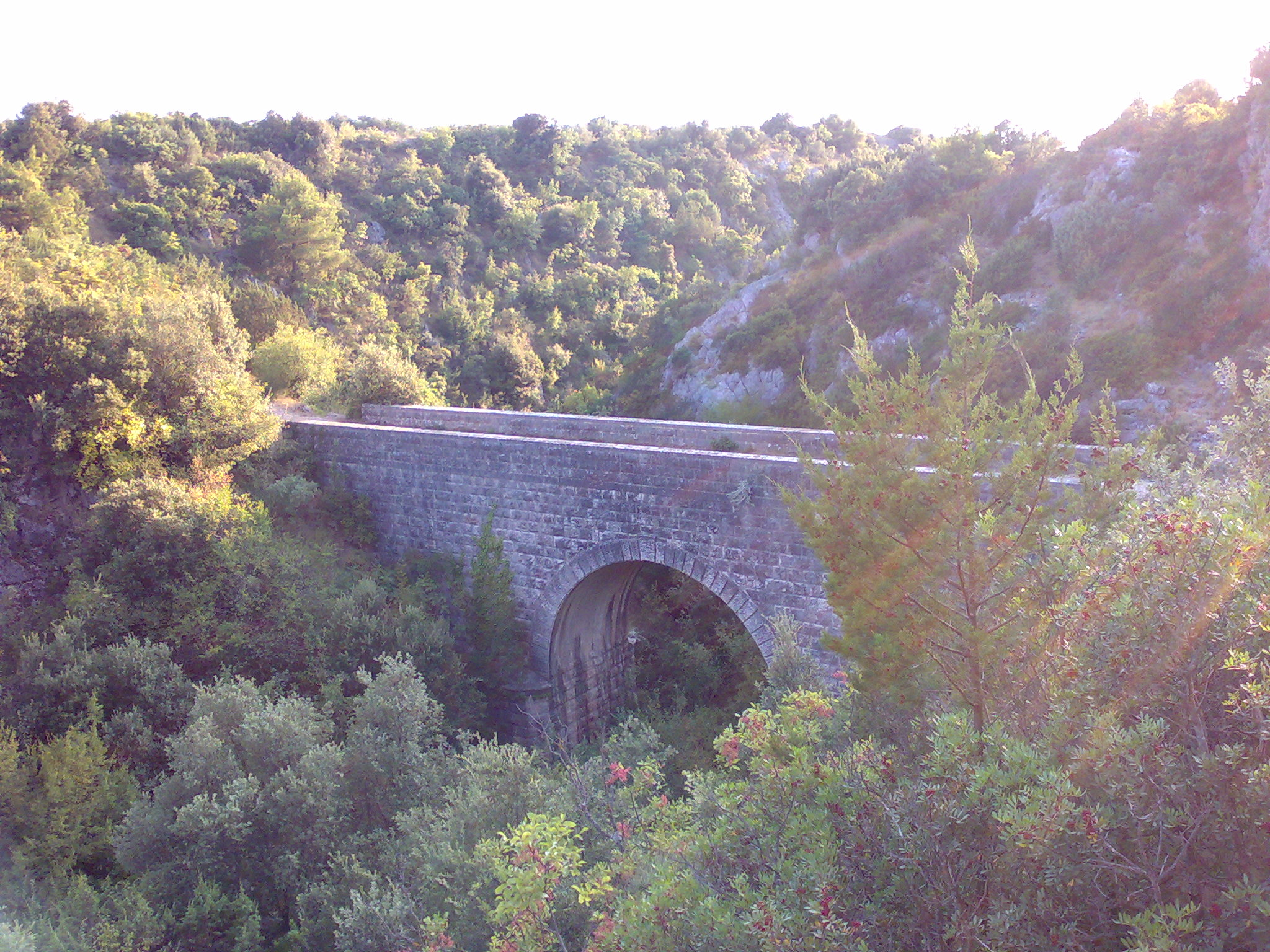
The only bridge of Brač, dedicated to emperor Franz Josef of Austria

Venice ruled for more than four centuries, until 1797, when the Habsburg monarchy annexed most of its territory in a deal with Napoleonic France. The official language was Latin.

During the Napoleonic Wars, Brač was conquered by the French Empire for a short time in 1806. In 1807, Prince-Bishop Petar I Njegoš of Montenegro managed to seize Brač with the help of the Russian navy, however already at the Congress of Vienna in 1815 the island was returned to the Austrian Empire. In 1827, the administrative center of Brač moved from Nerežišća to Supetar. Brač was incorporated into the Austrian crownland of Dalmatia from and became a part of Cisleithania of the Monarchy of Austria-Hungary from 1867. After the fall of Austria-Hungary 1918, Brač became part of the Kingdom of Serbs, Croats and Slovenes, or Yugoslavia since 1929. In 1939 an autonomous Croatian Banate was created that included the island.

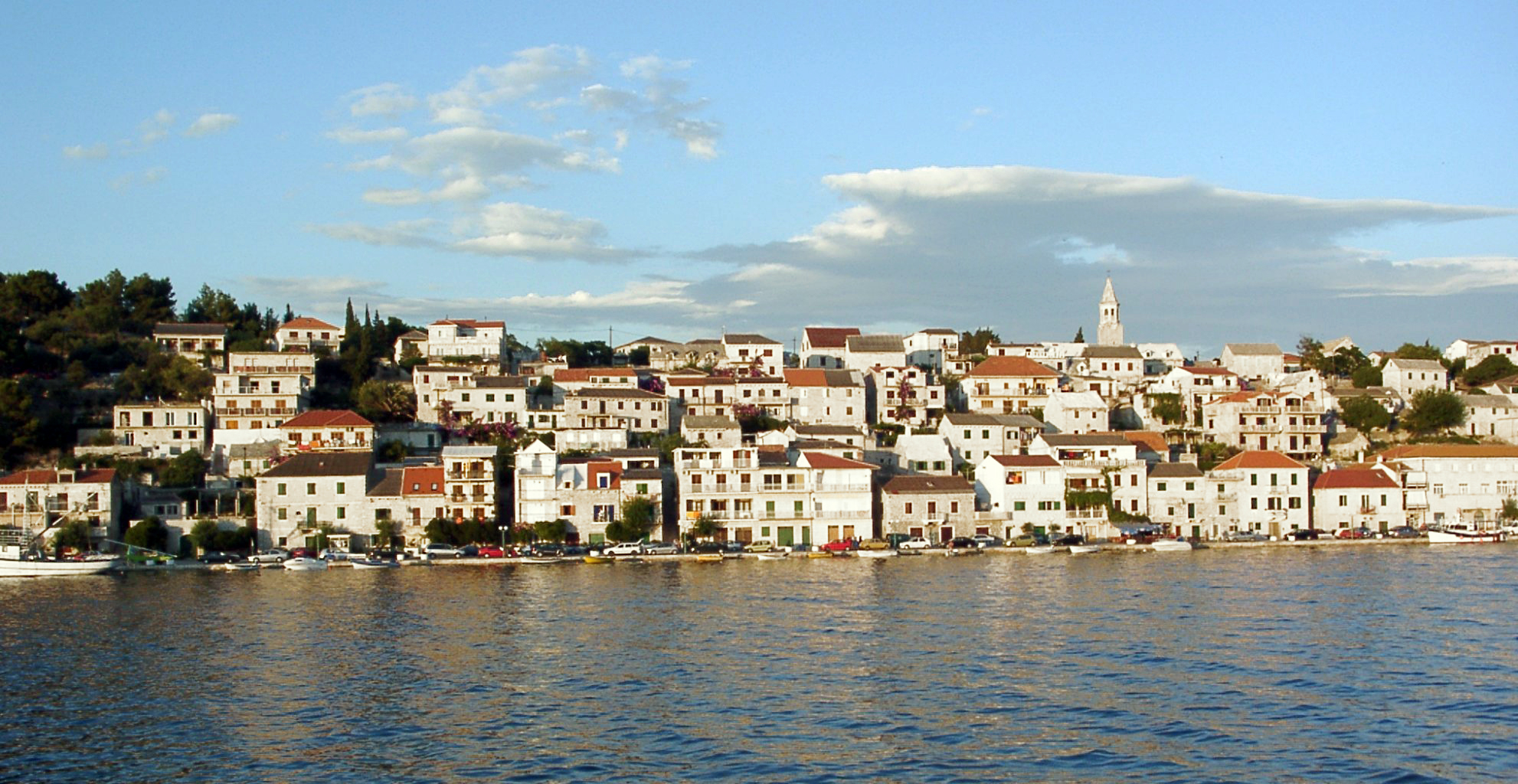
Povlja in the evening

=== Since 1918 ===
The population of the island drastically decreased from about 40,000 people in the beginning of the 20th century to about 13,000 at the end of the 20th century. This was due to heavy emigration, mostly to Latin America, especially Argentina and Chile, and to New Zealand and Australia. The emigration continued during the whole century, only later generations preferring to move to European countries, especially Germany. Among others, the Chilean writer Antonio Skármeta is descended from such immigrants, as well as, the former president of Chile, Gabriel Boric. Most of the emigration was caused due to dwindling economic opportunities on the island, particularly due to phylloxera causing huge economic losses on the vineyards.

In 1941 Italian forces occupied the island. In the mountainous regions of the island, native rebels fought a quite effective guerrilla war, but the occupiers answered harshly with arrests and executions. After the Italian capitulation in 1943, German troops occupied the island on January 12 and 13 of 1944, but in July they were defeated. Selca and six other towns on Brač were burned in August 9, which is said to have burned for three days and three nights. Yugoslav Partisans and their allies landed on Bol September 12, and started an offensive. German troops barricaded themselves in Sumartin on the eastern end of the island, with the goal to keep control of the Brač channel. The last large battle occurred on Mount Sveti Nikola between Selca and Sumartin on September 17. More than 700 people on Brač lost their lives. The island was freed on September 18, 1944. The school in Selca, not far from the battlefield, was named "18. Rujna" (September 18), but has been renamed since.

As part of Croatia it became part of the Socialist Federal Republic of Yugoslavia, until Croatia gained its independence in 1991, receiving recognition in 1992. The Croatian War of Independence was barely fought on the island (there was a brief bombing of Milna), but the aftermath of the war, especially the loss in tourism, was disastrous for the island. Only now is the island regenerating from the decade-long drainage of its most important revenue.

== Demographics ==
As of the 2021 census, the island has a population of 13,931. Most of the population is Croatian (95.3%) and Roman Catholic (83.5%). Over the last few decades, the population is increasingly concentrating in the largest city, Supetar, whereas many of the smaller settlements are getting even smaller. The birth rate was 8.8 births per 1000 in the 2010s. Women over 15 have given birth to 1.6 children on average.

Population of Brač
Year	1405	1436	1503	1559	1589	1682	1771	1857	1869	1880	1890	1900	1910	1921	1931	1948	1953	1961	1971	1981	1991	2001	2011	2021
Pop.	6,000	2,000	5,000	2,000	2,500	5,222	10,986	16,022	17,330	19,969	22,650	23,708	22,969	19,339	17,331	14,664	14,703	14,227	12,612	12,008	12,807	14,031	13,956	13,931
±%	—	−66.7%	+150.0%	−60.0%	+25.0%	+108.9%	+110.4%	+45.8%	+8.2%	+15.2%	+13.4%	+4.7%	−3.1%	−15.8%	−10.4%	−15.4%	+0.3%	−3.2%	−11.4%	−4.8%	+6.7%	+9.6%	−0.5%	−0.2%
Source: 1405-1559, 1682, 1589,1771-2011, 2021

Island of Brač: Population development
v

population	6000	2000	5000	2000	2500	5222	10986	16022	17330	19969	22650	23708	22969	19339	17331	14664	14703	14227	12612	12008	12807	14031	13956	13931
	1405	1436	1503	1559	1589	1682	1771	1857	1869	1880	1890	1900	1910	1921	1931	1948	1953	1961	1971	1981	1991	2001	2011	2021

Sources: 1405-1559, 1682, 1589,1771-2011, 2021

Population pyramid 2021
%	Males	Age	Females	%
1.1		85+		1.9
1.8		80–84		2.4
2.1		75–79		2.3
3.9		70–74		4.1
4.2		65–69		4.1
4.0		60–64		4.0
3.4		55–59		3.9
3.0		50–54		3.0
3.1		45–49		2.9
3.2		40–44		2.8
3.5		35–39		3.0
2.8		30–34		3.1
2.5		25–29		2.5
2.0		20–24		2.1
2.1		15–19		1.9
2.3		10–14		2.3
2.4		5–9		2.0
2.3		0–4		2.0

Of the population 15 or older, 2.4% did not finish elementary education (8th grade) and 16.2% finished elementary education. 59.6% finished secondary education. 21.8% finished higher education, including 0.26% (31 people) who have a doctorate of science.

== Economy ==
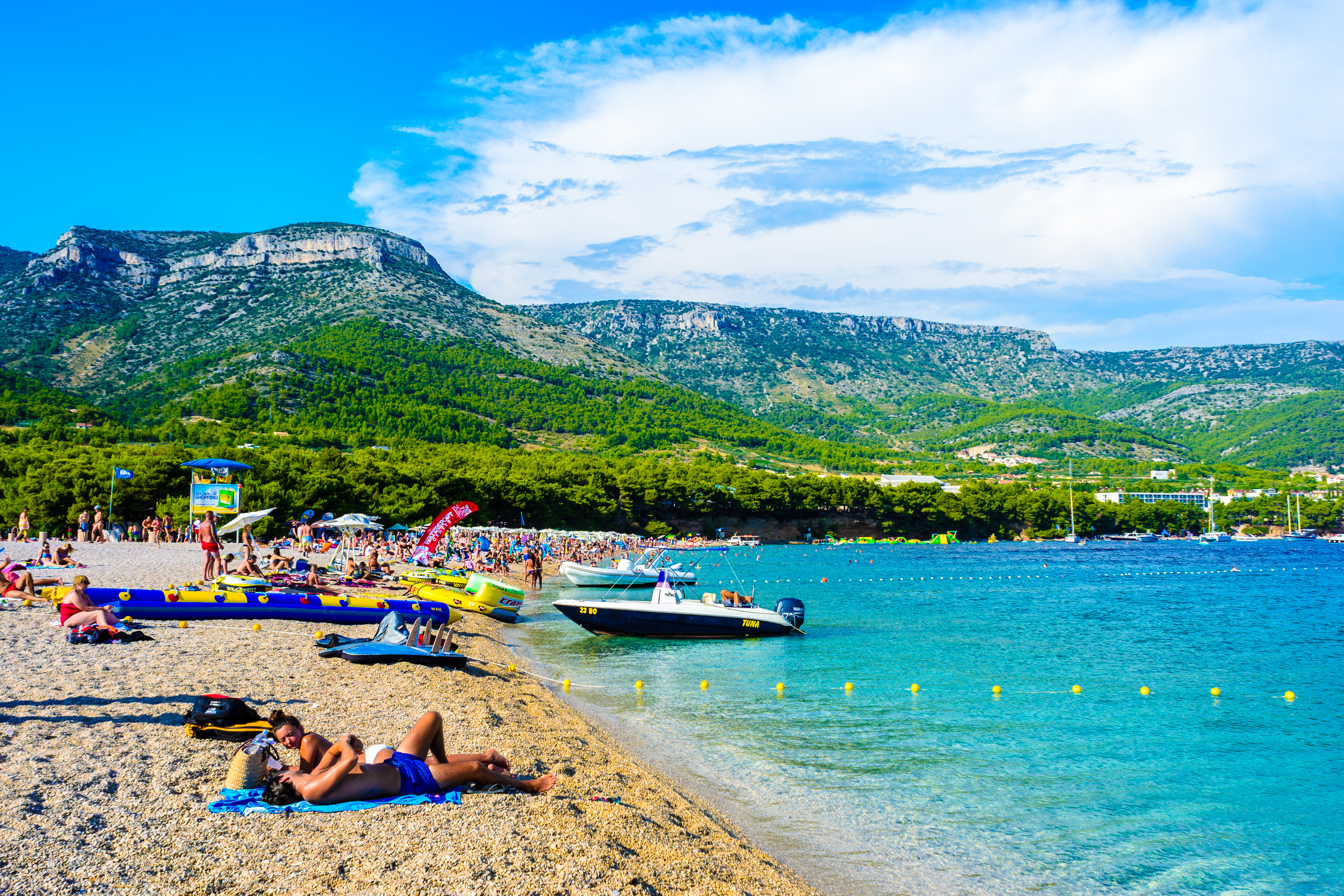
Beach on Brač during the summer.

The economy of Brač is based mostly on tourism, fishing and agriculture, and its white limestone.

=== Primary sector: agriculture, fishing, and stone quarrying ===
In agriculture, especially wine and olives are important. Olive oil from Brač has a protected designation of origin. Varenik, a syrup made from a local grape variety, is a protected geographical indication. Pliny commented that Brač was famous for its goats.

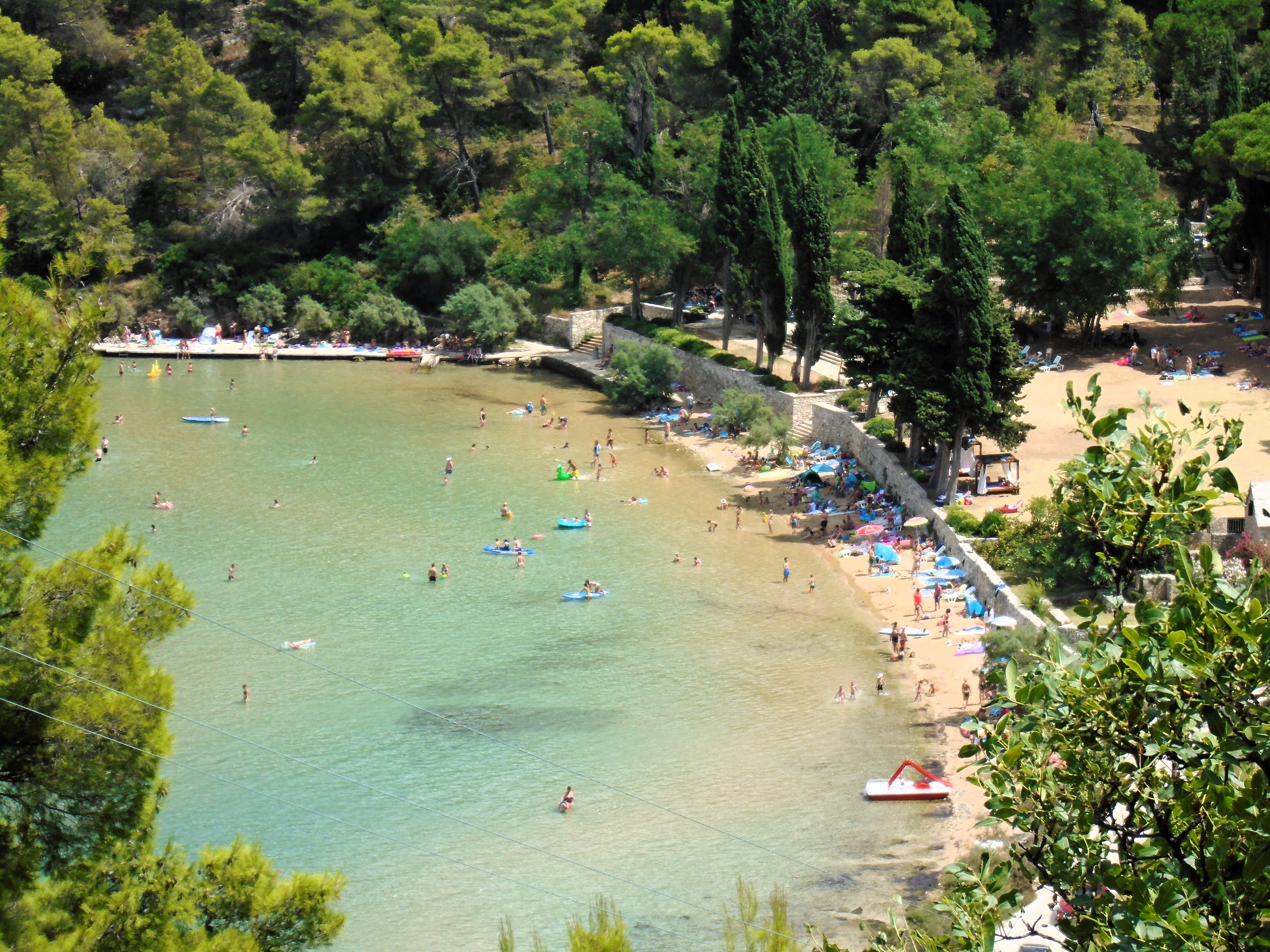
Lovrečina Beach near Postira

The famous Brač white limestone has been quarried for millennia. It was used in building Diocletian's Palace in Split, Banovina Palace in Novi Sad, and the Canadian National Vimy Memorial. The limestone is also claimed to have been used in the White House in Washington, D.C.

=== Secondary sector: energy ===
The island consumes about 90 GWh of energy per year. Most of the energy is provided through a power cable coming from the mainland, but recently two solar parks (SPP Pelegrin I and SPP Gornji Humac) east of Gornji Humac have started construction. Both have a nominal power of 9.9 MW. SPP Pelegrin I is expected to produce 15 GWh and SPP Gornji Humac is expected to produce 20 GWh. Their construction (together with SPP Gradac on the mainland, which also has 9.9 MW power) cost 35.3 Million Euro. They are operated by Encro d.o.o.

=== Tertiary sector: tourism ===
Brač was open to tourism already since the first half of the 20th century: in 1938, 2,850 tourists were registered. Following the second world war these numbers grew quickly: more than 30,000 tourists visited each year in the 1960s, and it found its preliminary high point just before the Croatian War of Independence, in 1989 and 1990, with more than 115,000 tourists, before it crashed down during the war to only 9,400 in 1992. Before the COVID pandemic significantly reduced the number of tourists, Brač counted 244,000 tourists in 2018.

The first luxury hotel to open on Brač was the Grand Hotel Elaphusa, in 1971.

"The morning of June 6th has dawned, and in the afternoon, the first guests will move into the newly built hotel: 60 Swiss tourists (ESCO Reisen from Basel). The employees of the company had been eagerly awaiting this ceremonial moment, filled with anticipation. For the first time, young hotel workers—mostly sons of Brač shepherds, fishermen, farmers, and stonemasons—will be serving in a real hotel. The newly built Elaphusa Hotel is a Category A establishment."

== See also ==
- 10645 Brač, asteroid name after the island

== Literature ==
- Marinković, Ivo, ed. (1984). Prirodne osnove otoka Brača [Natural foundations of the island of Brač]. Bračni zbornik (in Croatian). Vol. 14. Supetar: SIZ za kulturu općine Brač.
- Povijest otoka Brača, Dasen Vrsalović, Publisher: Skupština općine Brač, Savjet za prosvjetu i kulturu, Supetar, 1968, OCLC: 8993839 (in Croatian)
- Vlahović, Darko (2007). Otok Brač - Jadranska arkadija [Island Brač - Adriatic arcadia] (in Croatian). Split: Netgen. ISBN 978-953-7525-00-2.
- Šimunović, Petar (1997). Brač - Führer über die Insel [Brač - Guide to the island] (in German). Zagreb: Golden Marketing. ISBN 953-6168-32-4.
- C. Michael Hogan, "Diocletian's Palace", The Megalithic Portal, Andy Burnham ed., Oct. 6, 2007
- Poljak, Željko (February 1959). "Brač". Kazalo za "Hrvatski planinar" i "Naše planine" 1898—1958 (PDF) (in Croatian). Vol. XI. p. 20. ISSN 0354-0650.
- Barilla, Robert (2022). Otok Brač — Negdje između mora i zvijezda [Island Brač — Somewhere between the sea and the stars] (in Croatian). Supetar: Zaklada Otok Brač. ISBN 978-953-8395-00-0.
- Šenoa, Milan (1949). "Prilog poznavanju starih naziva naših otoka" [A Contribution to Learning the Old Names of Our Islands]. Hrvatski geografski glasnik (in Serbo-Croatian) (11–12): 75–82. ISSN 1331-5854.
