= WTA Tour records =

List of Women's Tennis records

The WTA Tour is the modern top-level women's professional tennis circuit. All records listed have been counted since the Women's Tennis Association's inception in June 1973 unless specified; some records may extend further for the sake of completeness as the WTA Tour replaced the pre-existing Virginia Slims Circuit. The names of active players appear in boldface unless specified. No boldface is used in lists exclusively for active players. These lists do not include events from the WTA Challenger Tour.

== Titles and finals ==
=== Most titles and finals ===
- Statistics span Open Era.

No.	Titles
167	(Czechoslovakia) / (United States) Martina Navratilova
154 (Note: Whilst the WTA Tour website claims Evert won 154 titles, multiple other sources claim she won 157 titles.)	(United States) Chris Evert
107	(West Germany) Steffi Graf
92 (Note: Court won 192 career titles, only 92 of those were during the Open Era.)	(Australia) Margaret Court
73	(United States) Serena Williams
68	(Australia) Evonne Goolagong
67 (Note: King won 129 career titles, of which only 67 were during the Open Era.)	(United States) Billie Jean King
55	(United Kingdom) Virginia Wade
55	(United States) Lindsay Davenport
53	(Socialist Federal Republic of Yugoslavia) / (United States) Monica Seles

No.	Finals
239	(Czechoslovakia) / (United States) Martina Navratilova
230	(United States) Chris Evert
138	(West Germany) Steffi Graf
122	(United States) Billie Jean King
121	(Australia) Margaret Court
119	(Australia) Evonne Goolagong
98	(United States) Serena Williams
93	(United States) Lindsay Davenport
85	(Socialist Federal Republic of Yugoslavia) / (United States) Monica Seles
83	(United States) **Venus Williams**

==== Active players ====
No.	Titles
49	(United States) Venus Williams
26	(Poland) Iga Świątek
24	Aryna Sabalenka
21	Victoria Azarenka
20	(Ukraine) Elina Svitolina
17	(Czech Republic) Karolína Plíšková
15	(Kazakhstan) Elena Rybakina
12	Anastasia Pavlyuchenkova
12	(United States) Coco Gauff
11	(United States) Jessica Pegula
11	(United States) Madison Keys
10	(Belgium) Elise Mertens
10	(Switzerland) Belinda Bencic
minimum 10 titles

No.	Finals
83	(United States) Venus Williams
45	Aryna Sabalenka
41	Victoria Azarenka
34	(Czech Republic) Karolína Plíšková
31	(Poland) Iga Świątek
28	(Kazakhstan) Elena Rybakina
25	(Ukraine) Elina Svitolina
25	(United States) Jessica Pegula
22	Anastasia Pavlyuchenkova
20	(Switzerland) Belinda Bencic
minimum 20 finals

=== Most titles and finals at a single tournament ===
No.	Titles	Tournament	Years
12	(Czech Republic) / (United States) Martina Navratilova	Chicago	1978–83, 1986–88, 1990–92
11	(Czech Republic) / (United States) Martina Navratilova	Eastbourne	1978, 1982–86, 1988–91, 1993
9	(Czech Republic) / (United States) Martina Navratilova	Washington	1975, 1977–78, 1982–83, 1985–86, 1988, 1990
9	(Czech Republic) / (United States) Martina Navratilova	Wimbledon	1978–79, 1982–87, 1990
9	(Czech Republic) / (United States) Martina Navratilova	Dallas	1979–83, 1985–87, 1990
9	(Germany) Steffi Graf	German Open	1986–89, 1991–94, 1996
8	(United States) Chris Evert	Family Circle	1974–78, 1981, 1984–85
8	(Czech Republic) / (United States) Martina Navratilova	WTA Tour Finals	1978–79, 1981, 1983–86 (Note: The WTA Finals were held twice in 1986 following a calendar change.)
8	(Czech Republic) / (United States) Martina Navratilova	Los Angeles	1978, 1980–81, 1983, 1986, 1989, 1992–93
8	(United States) Serena Williams	Miami Open	2002–04, 2007–08, 2013–15

No.	Finals	Tournament	Years
14	(Czech Republic) / (United States) Martina Navratilova	Chicago	1975, 1978–83, 1986–88, 1990–93
14	(Czech Republic) / (United States) Martina Navratilova	WTA Tour Finals	1975, 1978–86, 1989, 1991–92
13	(Czech Republic) / (United States) Martina Navratilova	Eastbourne	1978–79, 1982–87, 1988–91, 1993
12	(Czech Republic) / (United States) Martina Navratilova	Wimbledon	1978–79, 1982–90, 1994
11	(Czech Republic) / (United States) Martina Navratilova	Washington	1975, 1977–80, 1982–83, 1985–86, 1988, 1990
11	(Czech Republic) / (United States) Martina Navratilova	Dallas	1975–76, 1979–83, 1985–87, 1990
11	(Czech Republic) / (United States) Martina Navratilova	Los Angeles	1977–81, 1983, 1986, 1989–90, 1992–93
11	(Germany) Steffi Graf	German Open	1985–89, 1990–94, 1996
11	(United States) Serena Williams	Wimbledon	2002–04, 2008–10, 2012, 2015–16, 2018–19
10	(United States) Chris Evert	Wimbledon	1973–74, 1976,1978–82,1984–85
10	(United States) Serena Williams	Miami Open	1999, 2002–04, 2007–09, 2013–15
10	(United States) Serena Williams	US Open	1999, 2001–02, 2008, 2011–14, 2018–19

=== Most consecutive titles ===
No.	Consecutive titles won	Years
13	(Czech Republic) / (United States) Martina Navratilova	1984
12	(Australia) Margaret Court	1972–73
11	(West Germany) Steffi Graf	1989–90
10	(United States) Chris Evert	1974
9	(Australia) Margaret Court	1973
9	(Czech Republic) / (United States) Martina Navratilova	1986
8	(Czech Republic) / (United States) Martina Navratilova	1983
8	(West Germany) Steffi Graf	1988

No.	1+ title per consecutive season	Years
21	(Czechoslovakia) / (United States) Martina Navratilova	1974–94
18	(United States) Chris Evert	1971–88
14	(West Germany) Steffi Graf	1986–99
13	(Russia) Maria Sharapova	2003–15
11	(United Kingdom) Virginia Wade	1968–78
11	(Australia) Evonne Goolagong	1970–80
11	(Denmark) Caroline Wozniacki	2008–18
11	(United States) Serena Williams	2007–17

=== Youngest and oldest to win a title ===
- Does not include the WTA Challenger Tour nor equivalent events.

Age of first title		Event
14y 6m	(United States) Jennifer Capriati	1990 Puerto Rico
15y 1m	(Croatia) Mirjana Lučić	1997 Bol
15y 3m	(United States) Andrea Jaeger	1980 Las Vegas
15y 3m	(Czech Republic) Nicole Vaidišová	2004 Vancouver
15y 4m	(Socialist Federal Republic of Yugoslavia) Monica Seles	1989 Houston
15y 5m	(Argentina) Gabriela Sabatini	1985 Japan
15y 7m	(United States) **Coco Gauff**	2019 Linz
15y 8m	(Germany) Anke Huber	1990 Schenectady
16y 6m	**Kristina Liutova**	2026 Memphis

Age of last title		Event
39y 7m	(United States) Billie Jean King	1983 Edgbaston
38y 11m	(Japan) Kimiko Date-Krumm	2009 Seoul
38y 3m	(United States) Serena Williams	2020 ASB Classic
37y 10m	(Germany) **Tatjana Maria**	2025 Queen's Club
37y 4m	(United States) Martina Navratilova	1994 Open Gaz de France
36y 9m	(Italy) Francesca Schiavone	2017 Copa Colsanitas
36y 10m	(Romania) Sorana Cirstea	2026 Transylvania Open
35y 10m	(United States) **Venus Williams**	2016 Taiwan
35y 2m	(Hungary) Marie Pinterová	1981 Japan

=== Longest gap between successive titles ===
Gap	Player	From	To
16y 4m	(Croatia) Mirjana Lučić-Baroni	1998 Bol	2014 Quebec City
13y 1m	(Japan) Kimiko Date-Krumm	1996 San Diego	2009 Seoul
12y 6m	(Romania) Sorana Cîrstea	2008 Tashkent	2021 İstanbul
9y 9m	(France) Pauline Parmentier	2008 Bad Gastein	2018 İstanbul
8y 9m	(Socialist Federal Republic of Yugoslavia) / (Australia) Jelena Dokic	2002 Birmingham	2011 Kuala Lumpur

=== Lowest-ranked players to win a title ===
Ranking	Player	Tournament
N/A (Note: This player was unranked prior to winning the title.)	(Australia) Evonne Goolagong	1977 Australian Open
N/A	(Croatia) Mirjana Lučić-Baroni	1997 Bol
N/A	(Belgium) Kim Clijsters	2009 US Open
579	(Indonesia) Angelique Widjaja	2001 Bali
508	(Ukraine) **Elina Svitolina**	2023 Strasbourg
484	(United States) **Robin Montgomery**	2026 S-Hertogenbosch
299	(Russia) Margarita Gasparyan	2018 Tashkent
285	(Colombia) Fabiola Zuluaga	2002 Bogotá
259	(Austria) Tamira Paszek	2006 Portorož
246	(Russia) **Maria Timofeeva**	2023 Budapest
237	(Germany) **Tatjana Maria**	2022 Bogotá

== Matches ==
=== Highest win-loss percentage ===
- As of 2026 WTA Finals.

All-time
%	W-L	Match record
91.4	593–56	(Australia) Margaret Court
90.0	1309–146	(United States) Chris Evert
88.7	902–115	(Germany) Steffi Graf
86.8	1442–219	(Czech Republic) / (United States) Martina Navratilova
84.5	858–157	(United States) Serena Williams
83.0	595–122	(Socialist Federal Republic of Yugoslavia) / (United States) Monica Seles
82.0	525–115	(Belgium) Justine Henin
81.8	695–155	(United States) Billie Jean King
81.0	704–165	(Australia) Evonne Goolagong
80.5	446–108	(Poland) **Iga Świątek**
minimum 300 match wins

Active players
%	W-L	Match record
80.5	446–108	(Poland) Iga Świątek
75.6	204–66	(Russia) Mirra Andreeva
73.5	819–295	(United States) Venus Williams
71.6	444–176	(Kazakhstan) Elena Rybakina
71.3	326–131	(United States) Coco Gauff
71.2	527–213	(Belarus) Aryna Sabalenka
70.2	640–272	(Belarus) Victoria Azarenka
69.2	270–120	(China) Zheng Qinwen
69.1	295–132	(Czech Republic) Markéta Vondroušová
67.7	367–175	(Czech Republic) Karolína Muchová
minimum 200 match wins (65%)

=== Total wins and matches ===
No.	Won
1442	(Czech Republic) / (United States) Martina Navratilova
1309	(United States) Chris Evert
902	(Germany) Steffi Graf
858	(United States) Serena Williams
839	(United Kingdom) Virginia Wade
819	(United States) **Venus Williams**
759	(Spain) Arantxa Sánchez Vicario
756	(Netherlands) **Arantxa Rus**
753	(United States) Lindsay Davenport
739	(Spain) Conchita Martínez

No.	Played
1661	(Czech Republic) / (United States) Martina Navratilova
1455	(United States) Chris Evert
1323	(Germany) **Tatjana Maria**
1285	(United States) **Varvara Lepchenko**
1243	(Netherlands) **Arantxa Rus**
1206	(Italy) Sara Errani
1171	(Georgia (country)) **Sofia Shapatava**
1168	(United Kingdom) Virginia Wade
1132	(United States) **Madison Brengle**
1113	(United States) **Venus Williams**

==== Active players ====
No.	Won
819	(United States) Venus Williams
756	(Netherlands) Arantxa Rus
733	(Germany) Tatjana Maria
727	(United States) Varvara Lepchenko
664	(Czech Republic) Karolína Plíšková
650	(United States) Madison Brengle
640	(Belarus) Victoria Azarenka
619	(China) Zhang Shuai
615	(Germany) Laura Siegemund
613	Vera Zvonareva

No.	Played
1323	(Germany) Tatjana Maria
1285	(United States) Varvara Lepchenko
1243	(Netherlands) Arantxa Rus
1171	(Georgia (country)) Sofia Shapatava
1132	(United States) Madison Brengle
1113	(United States) Venus Williams
1088	(China) Zhang Shuai
1080	(Australia) Arina Rodionova
1078	(Turkey) Cagla Buyukakcay
1062	(Romania) Sorana Cîrstea

=== Consecutive match wins ===
No.	Player	Year(s)
74	(Czech Republic) / (United States) Martina Navratilova	1984
66	(West Germany) Steffi Graf	1989–90
58	(Czech Republic) / (United States) Martina Navratilova	1986–87
56	(United States) Chris Evert	1974
54	(Czech Republic) / (United States) Martina Navratilova	1983–84
46	(West Germany) Steffi Graf	1988
45	(West Germany) Steffi Graf	1987
42	(United States) Chris Evert	1975–76
41	(Czech Republic) / (United States) Martina Navratilova	1982
39	(Czech Republic) / (United States) Martina Navratilova	1982–83

== WTA Finals championship ==
No.	Titles
8	(Czech Republic) / (United States) Martina Navratilova
5	(Germany) Steffi Graf
5	(United States) Serena Williams
4	(United States) Chris Evert
3	(Socialist Federal Republic of Yugoslavia) / (United States) Monica Seles
3	(Belgium) Kim Clijsters

No.	Finals
14	(Czech Republic) / (United States) Martina Navratilova
8	(United States) Chris Evert
7	(United States) Serena Williams
6	(Germany) Steffi Graf
4	(Socialist Federal Republic of Yugoslavia) / (United States) Monica Seles
4	(Argentina) Gabriela Sabatini
4	(Switzerland) Martina Hingis
4	(United States) Lindsay Davenport

No.	Appearances
21	(Czech Republic) / (United States) Martina Navratilova
13	(United States) Chris Evert
13	(Germany) Steffi Graf
13	(Spain) Arantxa Sánchez
12	(United States) Zina Garrison
12	(Spain) Conchita Martínez

== WTA 1000 championships ==
Singles
No.	Titles
23	(United States) Serena Williams
17	(Switzerland) Martina Hingis
15	(Germany) Steffi Graf
14	(Russia) Maria Sharapova
12	(Poland) **Iga Świątek**
11	(United States) Lindsay Davenport
11	(Belarus) **Aryna Sabalenka**
10	(Belgium) Justine Henin
10	(Belarus) **Victoria Azarenka**
9	(Spain) Conchita Martínez
9	(Socialist Federal Republic of Yugoslavia) / (United States) Monica Seles
9	(United States) **Venus Williams**
9	(Romania) Simona Halep
9	(Czech Republic) Petra Kvitová

No.	Finals
33	Serena Williams
27	Martina Hingis
25	Maria Sharapova
22	Steffi Graf
21	Lindsay Davenport
18	Monica Seles
18	Simona Halep
15	**Venus Williams**
15	(Belarus) Victoria Azarenka
15	**Aryna Sabalenka**
14	Conchita Martínez
14	Justine Henin
14	**Iga Świątek**

No.	Semifinals
43	Serena Williams
38	Martina Hingis
37	Maria Sharapova
29	Simona Halep
28	Conchita Martínez
28	**Venus Williams**
26	Steffi Graf
26	Lindsay Davenport
26	(Belarus) Victoria Azarenka
25	Monica Seles
25	**Iga Świątek**

== WTA 500 championships ==
No.	Titles
26	(United States) Lindsay Davenport
24	(Germany) Steffi Graf
22	(Socialist Federal Republic of Yugoslavia) / (United States) Monica Seles
18	(Belgium) Kim Clijsters
18	(Belgium) Justine Henin
18	(United States) Venus Williams
18	(United States) Serena Williams

No.	Finals
46	(United States) Lindsay Davenport
37	(Socialist Federal Republic of Yugoslavia) / (United States) Monica Seles
32	(Germany) Steffi Graf
31	(United States) Venus Williams
28	(Belgium) Kim Clijsters
23	(Belgium) Justine Henin
21	(United States) Serena Williams

== WTA rankings ==
=== Total weeks & year-end No. 1 rankings ===
No.	Weeks at No. 1
377	(Germany) Steffi Graf
332	(Czech Republic) / (United States) Martina Navratilova
319	(United States) Serena Williams
260	(United States) Chris Evert
209	(Switzerland) Martina Hingis
178	(Socialist Federal Republic of Yugoslavia) / (United States) Monica Seles
125	(Poland) Iga Świątek
121	(Australia) Ashleigh Barty
117	(Belgium) Justine Henin
107	Aryna Sabalenka

No.	Year-end No. 1
8	(Germany) Steffi Graf
7	(Czech Republic) / (United States) Martina Navratilova
5	(United States) Chris Evert
5	(United States) Serena Williams
4	(United States) Lindsay Davenport
3	(Socialist Federal Republic of Yugoslavia) / (United States) Monica Seles
3	(Switzerland) Martina Hingis
3	(Belgium) Justine Henin
3	(Australia) Ashleigh Barty
2	(Denmark) Caroline Wozniacki
2	(Romania) Simona Halep
2	(Poland) **Iga Świątek**
2	**Aryna Sabalenka**

=== Most wins over world No. 1 ===
No.	Most wins
18	(Czech Republic) / (United States) Martina Navratilova
17	(United States) Serena Williams
15	(United States) Venus Williams
15	(United States) Lindsay Davenport
11	(West Germany) Steffi Graf
10	(Argentina) Gabriela Sabatini
10	(Kazakhstan) **Elena Rybakina**
9	(United States) Tracy Austin
9	(United States) Chris Evert
8	(France) Amélie Mauresmo

=== Lowest-ranked players to defeat world No. 1 ===
- Not including matches in which the No. 1-ranked player retired.

Rank	Player	Defeated	Event
226	(China) **Zhang Shuai**	(Russia) Dinara Safina	2009 Beijing (2R)
188	(France) Julie Coin	(Serbia) Ana Ivanovic	2008 US Open (2R)
164	(Czech Republic) Markéta Vondroušová	**Aryna Sabalenka**	2025 Berlin (SF)
133	(China) Zheng Jie	(Serbia) Ana Ivanovic	2008 Wimbledon (3R)
133	(Belgium) Kim Clijsters	(United States) Lindsay Davenport	2005 Indian Wells (F)

== WTA career prize money leaders ==
- Top 15 Career Prize Money Leaders As of 16 November 2026:
- Top 15 YTD Money Leaders As of 16 November 2026:

All time
	Player	Prize money
1	(United States) **Serena Williams**	$94,966,162
2	**Aryna Sabalenka**	$53,760,864
3	(Poland) **Iga Świątek**	$48,139,729
4	(United States) **Venus Williams**	$43,361,575
5	(Romania) Simona Halep	$40,236,618
6	(Belarus) Victoria Azarenka	$38,890,473
7	(Russia) Maria Sharapova	$38,777,962
8	(Czech Republic) Petra Kvitová	$37,653,615
9	(United States) **Coco Gauff**	$37,516,617
10	(Denmark) Caroline Wozniacki	$36,479,231
11	(Kazakhstan) **Elena Rybakina**	$35,573,137
12	(Ukraine) **Elina Svitolina**	$32,679,541
13	(Germany) Angelique Kerber	$32,545,460
14	(United States) **Jessica Pegula**	$28,312,854
15	(Poland) Agnieszka Radwańska	$27,683,807

Active players
	Player	Prize money
1	(United States) Serena Williams	$94,966,162
2	Aryna Sabalenka	$53,760,864
3	(Poland) Iga Świątek	$48,139,729
4	(United States) Venus Williams	$43,361,575
5	(Belarus) Victoria Azarenka	$38,890,473
6	(United States) Coco Gauff	$37,516,617
7	(Kazakhstan) Elena Rybakina	$35,573,137
8	(Ukraine) Elina Svitolina	$32,679,541
9	(United States) Jessica Pegula	$28,312,854
10	(Japan) Naomi Osaka	$27,216,321
11	(Czech Republic) Karolína Plíšková	$27,178,922
12	(United States) Madison Keys	$25,287,737
13	(Belgium) Elise Mertens	$21,249,105
14	(Latvia) Jeļena Ostapenko	$21,091,098
15	(United States) Sloane Stephens	$19,675,129

Single season
	Player	Year	Prize money
1	**Aryna Sabalenka**	2025	$15,008,519
2	(United States) **Serena Williams**	2013	$12,385,572
3	(Australia) Ashleigh Barty	2019	$11,307,587
4	(Kazakhstan) **Elena Rybakina**	2026	$11,134,420
5	(United States) **Serena Williams** (2)	2015	$10,582,642
6	**Mirra Andreeva**	2026	$10,522,615
7	(Germany) Angelique Kerber	2016	$10,136,615
8	(Poland) **Iga Świątek**	2025	$10,112,532
9	(Poland) **Iga Świątek** (2)	2022	$9,875,525
10	(Poland) **Iga Świątek** (3)	2023	$9,857,686
11	**Aryna Sabalenka** (2)	2024	$9,729,260
12	(United States) **Coco Gauff**	2024	$9,353,847
13	(United States) **Serena Williams** (3)	2014	$9,317,298
14	**Aryna Sabalenka** (3)	2026	$8,585,243
15	(Poland) **Iga Świątek** (4)	2024	$8,550,693

As of 16 November 2026

Since September 1970:

- 598 players have earned at least US$1 million.
- 378 players have earned at least US$2 million.
- 175 players have earned at least US$5 million.
- 89 players have earned at least US$10 million.
- 49 players have earned at least US$15 million.
- 30 players have earned at least US$20 million.
- 19 players have earned at least US$25 million.
- 13 players have earned at least US$30 million.
- 5 players have earned at least US$40 million.
- 2 players have earned at least US$50 million.
- 1 player has earned at least US$90 million.

== Doubles ==
=== Most doubles titles won ===
- As of the 2026 WTA Finals; taken from the WTA Tour website.

No.	All-time
177	(Czechoslovakia) / (United States) Martina Navratilova
112	(United States) Rosemary Casals
111	(United States) Pam Shriver
80	(Soviet Union) / (Belarus) Natasha Zvereva
79	(United States) Lisa Raymond
76	(Czechoslovakia) Jana Novotná
75	(Netherlands) Betty Stöve
69	(United States) Gigi Fernández
69	(Czechoslovakia) Helena Suková
69	(Spain) Arantxa Sánchez Vicario

No.	Active
40	(Czech Republic) Kateřina Siniaková
37	(Italy) Sara Errani
36	(Chinese Taipei) Hsieh Su-wei
31	(France) Kristina Mladenovic
30	(United States) Bethanie Mattek-Sands
26	(Canada) Gabriela Dabrowski
24	(Belgium) Elise Mertens
24	(Chinese Taipei) Chan Hao-ching
21	(Netherlands) Demi Schuurs
21	(Japan) Shuko Aoyama

== See also ==
- Lists of tennis records and statistics
- All-time tennis records – Women's singles
- Open Era tennis records – Women's singles
- WTA Finals
- List of WTA number 1 ranked singles tennis players
- List of WTA number 1 ranked doubles tennis players
- List of female tennis players
- WTA Awards
- List of tennis tournaments
- Grand Slam (tennis)
- All-time tennis records – Men's singles
- Open Era tennis records – Men's singles
- List of tennis players career achievements
- ATP Tour records
