= 1998 Croatian Bol Ladies Open =

- Date: 27 April – 3 May
- Edition: 5th
- Category: Tier IV
- Surface: Clay / outdoor
- Location: Bol, Croatia

Champions

Singles
- (Croatia) Mirjana Lučić

Doubles
- (Argentina) Laura Montalvo / (Argentina) Paola Suárez
| ← 1997 · | Croatian Bol Ladies Open | · 1999 → |

The 1998 Croatian Bol Ladies Open was a women's tennis tournament played on outdoor clay courts in Bol in Croatia that was part of Tier IV of the 1998 WTA Tour. It was the fifth edition of the tournament and was held from 27 April to 3 May 1998. Mirjana Lučić won the singles title.

== Finals ==
=== Singles ===
(Croatia) Mirjana Lučić defeated (United States) Corina Morariu 6–2, 6–4

- It was Lučić's 3rd title of the year and the 4th of her career.

=== Doubles ===
(Argentina) Laura Montalvo / (Argentina) Paola Suárez defeated (South Africa) Joannette Kruger / (Croatia) Mirjana Lučić by walkover

- It was Montalvo's 1st title of the year and the 3rd of her career. It was Suárez's 5th title of the year and the 6th of her career.

== See also ==
- 1998 Croatia Open Umag
