= 2014 Coupe Banque Nationale – Doubles =

Doubles
- 2014 Coupe Banque Nationale

Final
- Champions: (Czech Republic) Lucie Hradecká (Croatia) Mirjana Lučić-Baroni
- Runners-up: (Germany) Julia Görges (Czech Republic) Andrea Hlaváčková
- Score: 6–3, 7–6^{(10–8)}

Details
- Draw: 16
- Seeds: 4

Events
Singles	Doubles
- Tournoi de Québec

Alla Kudryavtseva and Anastasia Rodionova were the defending champions, but decided not to participate this year.

Lucie Hradecká and Mirjana Lučić-Baroni won the title, defeating Julia Görges and Andrea Hlaváčková 6–3, 7–6^{(10–8)} in the final.

== Seeds ==
1. (Hungary) Tímea Babos / (France) Kristina Mladenovic (semifinals)
2. (Germany) Julia Görges / (Czech Republic) Andrea Hlaváčková (final)
3. (Czech Republic) Lucie Hradecká / (Croatia) Mirjana Lučić-Baroni (champions)
4. (Canada) Gabriela Dabrowski / (Poland) Paula Kania (first round)

== Draw ==
Key

- Q = Qualifier
- WC = Wild card
- LL = Lucky loser
- Alt = Alternate
- ITF = ITF entry
- PR = Protected ranking
- SR = Special ranking
- SE = Special exempt
- JE = Junior exempt
- JR = Junior Accelerator Programme entrant
- CO = College Accelerator Programme entrant
- NG = Next Gen Accelerator Program entrant
- w/o = Walkover
- r = Retired
- d = Defaulted

First round
1	(Hungary) T Babos (France) K Mladenovic	6	6
(Canada) F Abanda (Canada) C Zhao	1	2
(United Kingdom) N Broady (United States) I Falconi	7	6
(Latvia) L Dekmeijere (United States) N Melichar	5	2
3	(Czech Republic) L Hradecká (Croatia) M Lučić-Baroni	6	6
(United States) S Crawford (United States) S Vickery	2	0
(United States) D Lao (United States) A Mueller	6^{4}	5
(Paraguay) V Cepede Royg (Canada) H El Tabakh	7^{7}	7
WC	(Canada) A Broomfield (Canada) M Patrascu	2	1
WC	(Canada) S Molnar (Canada) C Petrick	6	6
(Czech Republic) B Krejčíková (Germany) T Maria	6	6
4	(Canada) G Dabrowski (Poland) P Kania	4	4
(United States) A Tatishvili (Croatia) A Tomljanović	4	7	[3]
(United States) A Muhammad (United States) M Sanchez	6	5	[10]
(United States) L Chirico (United States) S Marand	2	4
2	(Germany) J Görges (Czech Republic) A Hlaváčková	6	6

Quarterfinals
1	(Hungary) T Babos (France) K Mladenovic	6	6
(United Kingdom) N Broady (United States) I Falconi	4	1
3	(Czech Republic) L Hradecká (Croatia) M Lučić-Baroni	6	6
(Paraguay) V Cepede Royg (Canada) H El Tabakh	4	3
WC	(Canada) S Molnar (Canada) C Petrick	3	4
(Czech Republic) B Krejčíková (Germany) T Maria	6	6
(United States) A Muhammad (United States) M Sanchez	7	4	[4]
2	(Germany) J Görges (Czech Republic) A Hlaváčková	5	6	[10]

Semifinals
1	(Hungary) T Babos (France) K Mladenovic	6	3	[9]
3	(Czech Republic) L Hradecká (Croatia) M Lučić-Baroni	4	6	[11]
(Czech Republic) B Krejčíková (Germany) T Maria	3	3
2	(Germany) J Görges (Czech Republic) A Hlaváčková	6	6

Final
3	(Czech Republic) L Hradecká (Croatia) M Lučić-Baroni	6	7^{10}
2	(Germany) J Görges (Czech Republic) A Hlaváčková	3	6^{8}
