= 2014 Coupe Banque Nationale =

- Date: September 8–14
- Edition: 22nd
- Category: WTA International
- Draw: 32S (24Q) / 16D (0Q)
- Prize money: US$250,000
- Surface: Carpet – indoors
- Location: Quebec City, Canada
- Venue: PEPS de l'Université Laval

Champions

Singles
- (Croatia) Mirjana Lučić-Baroni

Doubles
- (Czech Republic) Lucie Hradecká / (Croatia) Mirjana Lučić-Baroni
- Tournoi de Québec

The 2014 Coupe Banque Nationale was a tennis tournament played on indoor carpet courts. It was the 22nd edition of the Tournoi de Québec and the first with National Bank of Canada as the main sponsor, and was part of the WTA International tournaments of the 2014 WTA Tour. It took place at the PEPS de l'Université Laval in Quebec City, Canada, from September 8 through September 14, 2014.

== Finals ==
=== Singles ===
(Croatia) Mirjana Lučić-Baroni defeated (United States) Venus Williams, 6–4, 6–3

=== Doubles ===
(Czech Republic) Lucie Hradecká / (Croatia) Mirjana Lučić-Baroni defeated (Germany) Julia Görges / (Czech Republic) Andrea Hlaváčková, 6–3, 7–6^{(10–8)}

== Points and prize money ==
=== Point distribution ===
Event	W	F	SF	QF	Round of 16	Round of 32	Q	Q2	Q1
Singles	280	180	110	60	30	1	18	12	1
Doubles	280	180	110	60	1	—N/a	—N/a	—N/a	—N/a

=== Prize money ===
Event	W	F	SF	QF	Round of 16	Round of 32^{*}	Q2	Q1
Singles	$43,000	$21,400	$11,500	$6,175	$3,400	$2,100	$1,020	$600
Doubles	$12,300	$6,400	$3,435	$1,820	$960	—N/a	—N/a	—N/a
Doubles prize money per team

^* Qualifiers prize money is also the round of 32 prize money

== Singles main draw entrants ==
=== Seeds ===
Country	Player	Rank^{1}	Seed
USA	Venus Williams	20	1
CRO	Ajla Tomljanović	55	2
FRA	Kristina Mladenovic	73	3
USA	Shelby Rogers	86	4
GER	Julia Görges	94	5
POR	Michelle Larcher de Brito	104	6
USA	Anna Tatishvili	108	7
HUN	Tímea Babos	114	8

- ^{1} Rankings are as of August 25, 2014

=== Other entrants ===
The following players received wildcards into the singles main draw:

- (Canada) Françoise Abanda
- (Canada) Stéphanie Dubois
- (United States) Venus Williams

The following player entered the singles main draw with a protected ranking:

- (Germany) Tatjana Maria

The following players received entry from the qualifying draw:

- (United States) Samantha Crawford
- (Czech Republic) Barbora Krejčíková
- (United States) Sanaz Marand
- (Czech Republic) Tereza Martincová
- (United States) Asia Muhammad
- (Ukraine) Olga Savchuk

=== Withdrawals ===
Before the tournament

- (United States) Julia Boserup → replaced by (France) Alizé Lim
- (New Zealand) Marina Erakovic → replaced by (Czech Republic) Andrea Hlaváčková
- (France) Claire Feuerstein → replaced by (United States) Sachia Vickery
- (United States) Madison Keys → replaced by (Switzerland) Romina Oprandi
- (United States) Allie Kiick → replaced by (Czech Republic) Lucie Hradecká
- (Canada) Aleksandra Wozniak (right shoulder injury) → replaced by (Poland) Paula Kania

== Doubles main draw entrants ==
=== Seeds ===
Country	Player	Country	Player	Rank^{1}	Seed
HUN	Tímea Babos	FRA	Kristina Mladenovic	29	1
GER	Julia Görges	CZE	Andrea Hlaváčková	45	2
CZE	Lucie Hradecká	CRO	Mirjana Lučić-Baroni	86	3
CAN	Gabriela Dabrowski	POL	Paula Kania	149	4

- ^{1} Rankings are as of August 25, 2014

=== Other entrants ===
The following pairs received wildcards into the doubles main draw:

- (Canada) Ayan Broomfield / (Canada) Maria Patrascu
- (Canada) Sonja Molnar / (Canada) Charlotte Petrick
