= 1997 Croatian Bol Ladies Open – Doubles =

Doubles
- 1997 Croatian Bol Ladies Open

Final
- Champions: (Argentina) Laura Montalvo (Slovakia) Henrieta Nagyová
- Runners-up: (Argentina) María José Gaidano (Austria) Marion Maruska
- Score: 6–3, 6–1

Details
- Draw: 16
- Seeds: 4

Events
| Singles | Doubles |
| ← 1996 · | Croatian Bol Ladies Open | · 1998 → |

Laura Montalvo and Paola Suárez were the defending champions but only Montalvo competed that year with Henrieta Nagyová.

Montalvo and Nagyová won in the final 6–3, 6–1 against María José Gaidano and Marion Maruska.

== Seeds ==
Champion seeds are indicated in bold text while text in italics indicates the round in which those seeds were eliminated.

1. (South Africa) Amanda Coetzer / (Netherlands) Miriam Oremans (semifinals)
2. n/a
3. (Australia) Rachel McQuillan / (United States) Corina Morariu (first round)
4. (Italy) Laura Garrone / (Spain) Virginia Ruano-Pascual (semifinals)

== Draw ==
=== Key ===
- Q = Qualifier
- WC = Wild card
- LL = Lucky loser
- Alt = Alternate
- ITF = ITF entry
- PR = Protected ranking
- SR = Special ranking
- SE = Special exempt
- JE = Junior exempt
- JR = Junior Accelerator Programme entrant
- CO = College Accelerator Programme entrant
- NG = Next Gen Accelerator Program entrant
- w/o = Walkover
- r = Retired
- d = Defaulted

First round
1 | (South Africa) **A Coetzer** (Netherlands) **M Oremans** | **7** | **6**
(Czech Republic) R Bobková (Czech Republic) D Chládková | 5 | 3
(Switzerland) **E Gagliardi** (United States) **R Jensen** | **6** | **6**
(Slovenia) T Križan (France) N van Lottum | 3 | 3
3 | (Australia) R McQuillan (United States) C Morariu | 3 | **6** | 5
(Australia) **A Ellwood** (Croatia) **M Murić** | **6** | 4 | **7**
(Argentina) **L Montalvo** (Slovakia) **H Nagyová** | 4 | **6** | **6**
(Netherlands) S Noorlander (Greece) C Papadáki | **6** | 4 | 3
(Czech Republic) H Vildová (Slovakia) R Zrubáková | **7** | 4 | 2
(South Africa) **J Kruger** (Italy) **G Pizzichini** | 5 | **6** | **6**
(France) C Dhenin (France) S Pitkowski | 4 | 2
4 | (Italy) **L Garrone** (Spain) **V Ruano-Pascual** | **6** | **6**
Q | (Argentina) **M-J Gaidano** (Austria) **M Maruska** | **7** | **6**
(Germany) Adriana Barna (Germany) Anca Barna | 6 | 3
(Czech Republic) **S Kleinová** (Slovakia) **K Studeníková** | **6** | **6**
LL | (Puerto Rico) K Brandi (France) N Dechy | 0 | 3

Quarterfinals
1 | (South Africa) **A Coetzer** (Netherlands) **M Oremans** | **6** | **6**
(Switzerland) E Gagliardi (United States) R Jensen | 4 | 0
(Australia) A Ellwood (Croatia) M Murić | **6** | 3 | 3
(Argentina) **L Montalvo** (Slovakia) **H Nagyová** | 4 | **6** | **6**
(South Africa) J Kruger (Italy) G Pizzichini | 3 | 1
4 | (Italy) **L Garrone** (Spain) **V Ruano-Pascual** | **6** | **6**
Q | (Argentina) **M-J Gaidano** (Austria) **M Maruska** | 3 | **6** | **6**
(Czech Republic) S Kleinová (Slovakia) K Studeníková | **6** | 4 | 2

Semifinals
1 | (South Africa) A Coetzer (Netherlands) M Oremans | 0 | **7** | 5
(Argentina) **L Montalvo** (Slovakia) **H Nagyová** | **6** | 5 | **7**
4 | (Italy) L Garrone (Spain) V Ruano-Pascual | 4 | 2
Q | (Argentina) **M-J Gaidano** (Austria) **M Maruska** | **6** | **6**

Final
(Argentina) **Laura Montalvo** (Slovakia) **Henrieta Nagyová** | **6** | **6**
Q | (Argentina) María José Gaidano (Austria) Marion Maruska | 3 | 1
