= 2014 Coupe Banque Nationale – Singles =

Singles
- 2014 Coupe Banque Nationale

Final
- Champion: (Croatia) Mirjana Lučić-Baroni
- Runner-up: (United States) Venus Williams
- Score: 6–4, 6–3

Details
- Draw: 32
- Seeds: 8

Events
Singles	Doubles
- Tournoi de Québec

Lucie Šafářová was the defending champion, but decided not to participate this year.

Mirjana Lučić-Baroni won her first WTA singles title since 1998, defeating Venus Williams 6–4, 6–3 in the final.

== Seeds ==
1. (United States) Venus Williams (final)
2. (Croatia) Ajla Tomljanović (second round)
3. (France) Kristina Mladenovic (second round)
4. (United States) Shelby Rogers (semifinals)
5. (Germany) Julia Görges (semifinals)
6. (Portugal) Michelle Larcher de Brito (first round)
7. (United States) Anna Tatishvili (first round)
8. (Hungary) Tímea Babos (second round)

== Draw ==
Key

- Q = Qualifier
- WC = Wild card
- LL = Lucky loser
- Alt = Alternate
- ITF = ITF entry
- PR = Protected ranking
- SR = Special ranking
- SE = Special exempt
- JE = Junior exempt
- JR = Junior Accelerator Programme entrant
- CO = College Accelerator Programme entrant
- NG = Next Gen Accelerator Program entrant
- w/o = Walkover
- r = Retired
- d = Defaulted

=== Finals ===
Semifinals
1/WC	(United States) Venus Williams	6	6
4	(United States) Shelby Rogers	3	3
(Croatia) Mirjana Lučić-Baroni	6	5	6
5	(Germany) Julia Görges	4	7	2

Final
1/WC	(United States) Venus Williams	4	3
(Croatia) Mirjana Lučić-Baroni	6	6

=== Top half ===
First round
1/WC	(United States) V Williams	7	6
WC	(Canada) F Abanda	5	3
(Canada) G Dabrowski	3	5
Q	(Ukraine) O Savchuk	6	7
(United States) S Vickery	2	4
Q	(Czech Republic) B Krejčíková	6	6
(Czech Republic) L Hradecká	7^{7}	6
6	(Portugal) M Larcher de Brito	6^{4}	1
4	(United States) S Rogers	6	6
Q	(Czech Republic) T Martincová	1	3
(United Kingdom) J Konta	2	7^{7}	6^{4}
Q	(United States) A Muhammad	6	6^{0}	7^{7}
Q	(United States) S Crawford	3	3
(United States) M Brengle	6	6
PR	(Germany) T Maria	7^{11}	6
7	(United States) A Tatishvili	6^{9}	4

Second round
1/WC	(United States) V Williams	6	6
Q	(Ukraine) O Savchuk	1	2
Q	(Czech Republic) B Krejčíková	6	5	2
(Czech Republic) L Hradecká	3	7	6
4	(United States) S Rogers	6^{5}	7^{7}	7^{7}
Q	(United States) A Muhammad	7^{7}	6^{2}	6^{5}
(United States) M Brengle	6	4	0
PR	(Germany) T Maria	4	6	6

Quarterfinals
1/WC	(United States) V Williams	6	4	7^{7}
(Czech Republic) L Hradecká	3	6	6^{3}
4	(United States) S Rogers	6	6
PR	(Germany) T Maria	4	2

Semifinals
1/WC	(United States) V Williams	6	6
4	(United States) S Rogers	3	3

=== Bottom half ===
First round
8	(Hungary) T Babos	6	3	6
(Switzerland) R Oprandi	1	6	4
(Paraguay) V Cepede Royg	3	1
(Croatia) M Lučić-Baroni	6	6
(Kazakhstan) S Karatantcheva	3	6	7^{8}
Q	(United States) S Marand	6	1	6^{6}
(United Kingdom) N Broady	4	5
3	(France) K Mladenovic	6	7
5	(Germany) J Görges	6	6
WC	(Canada) S Dubois	1	2
(France) A Lim	7	3	3
(United States) M Oudin	5	6	6
(Poland) P Kania	3	0
(Czech Republic) A Hlaváčková	6	6
(United States) I Falconi	4	1
2	(Croatia) A Tomljanović	6	6

Second round
8	(Hungary) T Babos	6^{3}	2
(Croatia) M Lučić-Baroni	7^{7}	6
(Kazakhstan) S Karatantcheva	5	6	7
3	(France) K Mladenovic	7	4	5
5	(Germany) J Görges	6	6
(United States) M Oudin	2	2
(Czech Republic) A Hlaváčková	6	3	6
2	(Croatia) A Tomljanović	3	6	3

Quarterfinals
(Croatia) M Lučić-Baroni	7	6
(Kazakhstan) S Karatantcheva	5	0
5	(Germany) J Görges	6^{6}	7	6
(Czech Republic) A Hlaváčková	7^{8}	5	2

Semifinals
(Croatia) M Lučić-Baroni	6	5	6
5	(Germany) J Görges	4	7	2

== Qualifying ==
=== Seeds ===
1. (Canada) Heidi El Tabakh (qualifying competition)
2. (United States) Louisa Chirico (qualifying competition)
3. (Japan) Nao Hibino (qualifying competition)
4. (Ukraine) Olga Savchuk (qualified)
5. (Czech Republic) Barbora Krejčíková (qualified)
6. (Czech Republic) Kateřina Vaňková (qualifying competition)
7. (United States) Sanaz Marand (qualified)
8. (Czech Republic) Tereza Martincová (qualified)
9. (United States) Asia Muhammad (qualified)
10. (United States) Maria Sanchez (qualifying competition)
11. (Canada) Carol Zhao (qualifying competition)
12. (United States) Samantha Crawford (qualified)

=== Qualifiers ===
1. (United States) Asia Muhammad
2. (United States) Samantha Crawford
3. (United States) Sanaz Marand
4. (Ukraine) Olga Savchuk
5. (Czech Republic) Barbora Krejčíková
6. (Czech Republic) Tereza Martincová

=== Qualifying draw ===
==== First qualifier ====
First round
1/WC	(Canada) Heidi El Tabakh	6	6
(Canada) Sonja Molnar	1	4
WC	(Canada) Maria Patrascu	1	1
9	(United States) Asia Muhammad	6	6

Qualifying competition
1/WC	(Canada) Heidi El Tabakh	2	6	2
9	(United States) Asia Muhammad	6	4	6

==== Second qualifier ====
First round
2	(United States) Louisa Chirico	6	6
(United States) Chiara Scholl	4	1
(United States) Bernarda Pera	1	4
12	(United States) Samantha Crawford	6	6

Qualifying competition
2	(United States) Louisa Chirico	5	1
12	(United States) Samantha Crawford	7	6

==== Third qualifier ====
First round
3	(Japan) Nao Hibino	6	6
WC	(Canada) Ayan Broomfield	3	4
(United States) Tori Kinard	6	5	4
7	(United States) Sanaz Marand	4	7	6

Qualifying competition
3	(Japan) Nao Hibino	1	0
7	(United States) Sanaz Marand	6	6

==== Fourth qualifier ====
First round
4	(Ukraine) Olga Savchuk	6	6
(United States) Denise Muresan	2	2
(United States) Nicole Melichar	6	2	6^{6}
11	(Canada) Carol Zhao	3	6	7^{8}

Qualifying competition
4	(Ukraine) Olga Savchuk	7^{7}	6
11	(Canada) Carol Zhao	6^{3}	3

==== Fifth qualifier ====
First round
5	(Czech Republic) Barbora Krejčíková	6	6
(United States) Danielle Lao	3	1
WC	(Canada) Charlotte Petrick	1	5
10	(United States) Maria Sanchez	6	7

Qualifying competition
5	(Czech Republic) Barbora Krejčíková	6	7^{7}
10	(United States) Maria Sanchez	3	6^{1}

==== Sixth qualifier ====
First round
6	(Czech Republic) Kateřina Vaňková	6	6
(United States) Alexandra Mueller	1	3
(United States) Jennifer Elie	4	0
8	(Czech Republic) Tereza Martincová	6	6

Qualifying competition
6	(Czech Republic) Kateřina Vaňková	4	6	5
8	(Czech Republic) Tereza Martincová	6	3	7
