= 1997 Croatian Bol Ladies Open =

- Date: 28 April – 4 May
- Edition: 4th
- Category: Tier IV
- Draw: 32S / 16D
- Prize money: $107,500
- Surface: Clay / outdoor
- Location: Bol, Croatia

Champions

Singles
- (Croatia) Mirjana Lučić

Doubles
- (Argentina) Laura Montalvo / (Slovakia) Henrieta Nagyová
← 1996 ·	Croatian Bol Ladies Open	· 1998 →

The 1997 Croatian Bol Ladies Open was a women's tennis tournament played on outdoor clay courts in Bol in Croatia that was part of Tier IV of the 1997 WTA Tour. It was the fourth edition of the tournament and was held from 28 April through 4 May 1997. Unseeded Mirjana Lučić, who entered the main draw as a qualifier, won the singles title.

== Finals ==
=== Singles ===
(Croatia) Mirjana Lučić defeated (United States) Corina Morariu 7–5, 6–7^{(4–7)}, 7–6^{(7–5)}

- It was Lučić's only singles title of the year and the 1st of her career.

=== Doubles ===
(Argentina) Laura Montalvo / (Slovakia) Henrieta Nagyová defeated (Argentina) María José Gaidano / (Austria) Marion Maruska 6–3, 6–1

- It was Montalvo's only doubles title of the year and the 2nd of her career. It was Nagyová's only doubles title of the year and the 1st of her career.
