= 1998 Croatian Bol Ladies Open – Doubles =

Doubles
- 1998 Croatian Bol Ladies Open

Final
- Champions: (Argentina) Laura Montalvo (Argentina) Paola Suárez
- Runners-up: (South Africa) Joannette Kruger (Croatia) Mirjana Lučić
- Score: Walkover

Events
Singles	Doubles
← 1997 ·	Croatian Bol Ladies Open	· 1999 →

Laura Montalvo and Henrieta Nagyová were the defending champions but only Montalvo competed that year with Paola Suárez.

Montalvo and Suárez won the final on a walkover against Joannette Kruger and Mirjana Lučić.

== Seeds ==
Champion seeds are indicated in bold text while text in italics indicates the round in which those seeds were eliminated.

1. (Japan) Nana Miyagi / (United States) Corina Morariu (semifinals)
2. (Argentina) **Laura Montalvo** / (Argentina) **Paola Suárez (champions)**
3. (Italy) Laura Golarsa / (South Africa) Liezel Horn (quarterfinals)
4. (Hungary) Virag Csurgo / (Czech Republic) Eva Martincová (quarterfinals)

== Draw ==
=== Key ===
- Q = Qualifier
- WC = Wild card
- LL = Lucky loser
- Alt = Alternate
- SE = Special exempt
- PR = Protected ranking
- ITF = ITF entry
- JE = Junior exempt
- w/o = Walkover
- r = Retired
- d = Defaulted
- SR = Special ranking

First round

Quarterfinals

Semifinals

Final

1
- (Japan) **N Miyagi**
- (United States) **C Morariu**
**6**
**6**

- (Spain) C Martínez Granados
- (Argentina) L Masante
1
0

1
- (Japan) **N Miyagi**
- (United States) **C Morariu**
**7**
6
**6**

WC
- (Croatia) **J Kostanić**
- (France) **A Mauresmo**
3
**6**
**6**

WC
- (Croatia) J Kostanić
- (France) A Mauresmo
5
**7**
4

- (Zimbabwe) C Black
- (Kazakhstan) I Selyutina
**6**
4
3

1
- (Japan) N Miyagi
- (United States) C Morariu
5
**6**
2

4
- (Hungary) **V Csurgó**
- (Czech Republic) **E Martincová**
5
**6**
**6**

- (South Africa) **J Kruger**
- (Croatia) **M Lučić**
**7**
4
**6**

- (Hungary) P Gáspár
- (Hungary) N Köves
**7**
3
1

4
- (Hungary) V Csurgó
- (Czech Republic) E Martincová
2
5

- (South Africa) **J Kruger**
- (Croatia) **M Lučić**
5
**6**
**6**

- (South Africa) **J Kruger**
- (Croatia) **M Lučić**
**6**
**7**

- (Argentina) M Díaz Oliva
- (Romania) R Sandu
**7**
0
4

- (South Africa) Joannette Kruger
- (Croatia) Mirjana Lučić

- (Czech Republic) L Němečková
- (Slovakia) K Studeníková
4
4

2
- (Argentina) **Laura Montalvo**
- (Argentina) **Paola Suárez**
**w/o**

- (Slovenia) **T Križan**
- (Slovenia) **K Srebotnik**
**6**
**6**

- (Slovenia) **T Križan**
- (Slovenia) **K Srebotnik**
**w/o**

- (Italy) S Cecchini
- (Spain) G León García
2
3

3
- (Italy) L Golarsa
- (South Africa) L Horn

3
- (Italy) **L Golarsa**
- (South Africa) **L Horn**
**6**
**6**

- (Slovenia) T Križan
- (Slovenia) K Srebotnik
2
4

- (Hungary) **K Marosi**
- (Austria) **S Plischke**
**6**
**6**

2
- (Argentina) **L Montalvo**
- (Argentina) **P Suárez**
**6**
**6**

- (Argentina) M-F Landa
- (India) N Vaidyanathan
2
4

- (Hungary) K Marosi
- (Austria) S Plischke
2
4

Q
- (Puerto Rico) K Brandi
- (United States) R Jensen
2
1

2
- (Argentina) **L Montalvo**
- (Argentina) **P Suárez**
**6**
**6**

2
- (Argentina) **L Montalvo**
- (Argentina) **P Suárez**
**6**
**6**
