= 1997 Croatian Bol Ladies Open – Singles =

Singles
- 1997 Croatian Bol Ladies Open
- 1996 Champion: (Italy) Gloria Pizzichini

Final
- Champion: (Croatia) Mirjana Lučić
- Runner-up: (United States) Corina Morariu
- Score: 7–5, 6–7^{(4–7)}, 7–6^{(7–5)}

Details
- Draw: 32
- Seeds: 8

Events
Singles	Doubles
← 1996 ·	Croatian Bol Ladies Open	· 1998 →

Gloria Pizzichini was the defending champion but lost in the second round to Sarah Pitkowski.

15-year-old Mirjana Lučić won in the final 7–5, 6–7^{(4–7)}, 7–6^{(7–5)} against Corina Morariu. The tournament was Lučić's professional debut on the WTA Tour, making her the first unranked player to win a title on the WTA Tour.

== Seeds ==
A champion seed is indicated in bold text while text in italics indicates the round in which that seed was eliminated.

1. (South Africa) Amanda Coetzer (semifinals)
2. (Belgium) Dominique Van Roost (first round)
3. (Slovakia) Henrieta Nagyová (first round)
4. (Slovakia) Katarína Studeníková (quarterfinals)
5. (France) Alexandra Fusai (second round)
6. (Netherlands) Miriam Oremans (first round)
7. (Italy) Gloria Pizzichini (second round)
8. (Australia) Annabel Ellwood (first round)

== Draw ==
=== Key ===
- Q = Qualifier
- WC = Wild card
- LL = Lucky loser
- Alt = Alternate
- ITF = ITF entry
- PR = Protected ranking
- SR = Special ranking
- SE = Special exempt
- JE = Junior exempt
- JR = Junior Accelerator Programme entrant
- CO = College Accelerator Programme entrant
- NG = Next Gen Accelerator Program entrant
- w/o = Walkover
- r = Retired
- d = Defaulted

First round
1	(South Africa) **A Coetzer**	**6**	**6**
LL	(Austria) M Schnell	1	2
(France) N van Lottum	4	1
(Puerto Rico) **K Brandi**	**6**	**6**
LL	(Argentina) M-J Gaidano	5	4
(France) **S Pitkowski**	**7**	**6**
(Spain) V Ruano-Pascual	2	**6**	6
7	(Italy) **G Pizzichini**	**6**	2	**7**
4	(Slovakia) **K Studeníková**	**6**	**6**
Q	(Spain) L Pena	4	3
(Spain) **C Torrens Valero**	**6**	**6**
(South Africa) M de Swardt	3	3
Q	(Australia) R McQuillan	2	2
Q	(Croatia) **M Lučić**	**6**	**6**
(Slovakia) R Zrubáková	6	**6**	1
5	(France) **A Fusai**	**7**	0	**6**
6	(Netherlands) M Oremans	3	**6**	6
(South Africa) **J Kruger**	**6**	3	**7**
Q	(Spain) **A Alcázar**	**6**	**6**
WC	(Croatia) M Murić	4	2
(United States) **C Morariu**	**6**	**6**
WC	(Croatia) M Palaveršić	4	4
(Czech Republic) **D Chládková**	**6**	**7**
3	(Slovakia) H Nagyová	4	5
8	(Australia) A Ellwood	2	2
(Croatia) **S Talaja**	**6**	**6**
(Switzerland) **E Gagliardi**	**6**	5	**6**
(Germany) P Begerow	4	**7**	3
(Austria) S Dopfer	3	5
(Austria) **M Maruska**	**6**	**7**
(Czech Republic) **S Kleinová**	**6**	**7**
2	(Belgium) D Van Roost	2	6

Second round
1	(South Africa) **A Coetzer**	2	**6**	**6**
(Puerto Rico) K Brandi	**6**	0	3
(France) **S Pitkowski**	4	**6**	**6**
7	(Italy) G Pizzichini	**6**	4	2
4	(Slovakia) **K Studeníková**	**6**	**6**
(Spain) C Torrens Valero	2	0
Q	(Croatia) **M Lučić**	w/o
5	(France) A Fusai
(South Africa) **J Kruger**	3	**6**	**6**
Q	(Spain) A Alcázar	**6**	4	0
(United States) **C Morariu**	**6**	**7**
(Czech Republic) D Chládková	3	6
(Croatia) S Talaja	3	**6**	4
(Switzerland) **E Gagliardi**	**6**	3	**6**
(Austria) **M Maruska**	**6**	**6**
(Czech Republic) S Kleinová	2	4

Quarterfinals
1	(South Africa) **A Coetzer**	**6**	**7**
(France) S Pitkowski	4	6
4	(Slovakia) K Studeníková	5	4
Q	(Croatia) **M Lučić**	**7**	**6**
(South Africa) J Kruger	1	**6**	4
(United States) **C Morariu**	**6**	2	**6**
(Switzerland) **E Gagliardi**	**6**	**6**
(Austria) M Maruska	4	1

Semifinals
1	(South Africa) A Coetzer	4	3
Q	(Croatia) **M Lučić**	**6**	**6**
(United States) **C Morariu**	**6**	1	**6**
(Switzerland) E Gagliardi	1	**6**	3

Final
Q	(Croatia) **Mirjana Lučić**	**7**	6	**7**
(United States) Corina Morariu	5	**7**	6
