= 2019 Ashleigh Barty tennis season =

2019 tennis player season

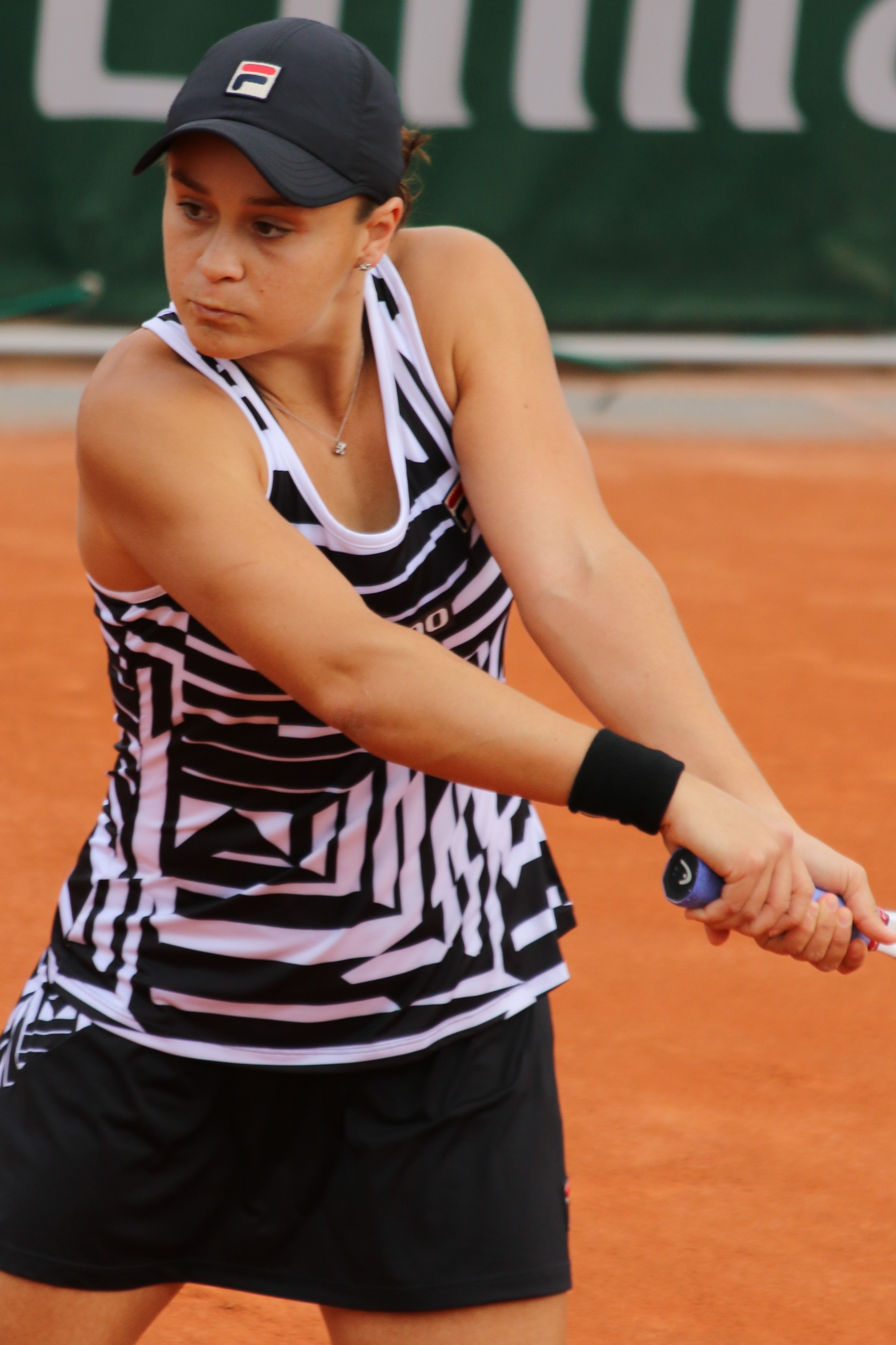
- Barty playing at the 2019 French Open
- Full name: Ashleigh Barty
- Country: Australia
- Calendar prize money: $11,301,281

Singles
- Season record: 57–13
- Calendar titles: 4
- Year-end ranking: No. 1
- Ranking change from previous year: ▲14

Grand Slam & significant results
- Australian Open: QF
- French Open: W
- Wimbledon: 4R
- US Open: 4R
- Championships: W

Doubles
- Season record: 26–7
- Calendar titles: 1
- Year-end ranking: No. 19
- Ranking change from previous year: ▼12

Grand Slam doubles results
- Australian Open: 2R
- French Open: 3R
- Wimbledon: 3R
- US Open: F
- WTA Championships: Did not qualify

Fed Cup
- Fed Cup: World Group Final
- Last updated on: 25 July 2021.

The 2019 Ashleigh Barty tennis season officially began on 7 January 2019 as the start of the 2019 WTA Tour. Ashleigh Barty entered the season as world number 15 in singles and finished as world number 1. The season saw Barty won her first single's major at the French Open.

== All matches ==
Key
W	F	SF	QF	#R	RR	Q#	P#	DNQ	A	Z#	PO	G	S	B	NMS	NTI	P	NH

(W) winner; (F) finalist; (SF) semifinalist; (QF) quarterfinalist; (#R) rounds 4, 3, 2, 1; (RR) round-robin stage; (Q#) qualification round; (P#) preliminary round; (DNQ) did not qualify; (A) absent; (Z#) Davis/Fed Cup Zonal Group (with number indication) or (PO) play-off; (G) gold, (S) silver or (B) bronze Olympic/Paralympic medal; (NMS) not a Masters tournament; (NTI) not a Tier I tournament; (P) postponed; (NH) not held; (SR) strike rate (events won / competed); (W–L) win–loss record.
To avoid confusion and double counting, these charts are updated at the conclusion of a tournament or when the player's participation has ended.

=== Singles matches ===
Tournament	Match	Round	Opponent	Rank	Result	Score
Sydney International; Sydney, Australia; WTA Premier; Hard, outdoor; 7 January 2019 – 13 January 2019	1	1R	(Latvia) Jeļena Ostapenko	22	Win	6–3, 6–3
Sydney International; Sydney, Australia; WTA Premier; Hard, outdoor; 7 January 2019 – 13 January 2019	2	2R	(Romania) Simona Halep (1)	1	Win	6–4, 6–4
Sydney International; Sydney, Australia; WTA Premier; Hard, outdoor; 7 January 2019 – 13 January 2019	3	QF	(Belgium) Elise Mertens (10)	12	Win	6–3, 6–3
Sydney International; Sydney, Australia; WTA Premier; Hard, outdoor; 7 January 2019 – 13 January 2019	4	SF	(Netherlands) Kiki Bertens (7)	9	Win	6–7^{(4–7)}, 6–4, 7–5
Sydney International; Sydney, Australia; WTA Premier; Hard, outdoor; 7 January 2019 – 13 January 2019	5	F	(Czech Republic) Petra Kvitová (5/WC)	8	Loss (1)	6–1, 5–7, 6–7^{(3–7)}
Australian Open; Melbourne, Australia; Grand Slam; Hard, outdoor; 14 January 2019 – 27 January 2019	6	1R	(Thailand) Luksika Kumkhum	67	Win	6–2, 6–2
Australian Open; Melbourne, Australia; Grand Slam; Hard, outdoor; 14 January 2019 – 27 January 2019	7	2R	(China) Wang Yafan	65	Win	6–2, 6–3
Australian Open; Melbourne, Australia; Grand Slam; Hard, outdoor; 14 January 2019 – 27 January 2019	8	3R	(Greece) Maria Sakkari	43	Win	7–5, 6–1
Australian Open; Melbourne, Australia; Grand Slam; Hard, outdoor; 14 January 2019 – 27 January 2019	9	4R	(Russia) Maria Sharapova (30)	30	Win	4–6, 6–1, 6–4
Australian Open; Melbourne, Australia; Grand Slam; Hard, outdoor; 14 January 2019 – 27 January 2019	10	QF	(Czech Republic) Petra Kvitová (8)	6	Loss	1–6, 4–6
Fed Cup Quarterfinals; Australia vs. United States; Asheville, United States; Fed Cup; Hard, indoor; 9 February 2019 – 10 February 2019	11	QF	(United States) Sofia Kenin	37	Win	6–1, 7–6^{(7–2)}
Fed Cup Quarterfinals; Australia vs. United States; Asheville, United States; Fed Cup; Hard, indoor; 9 February 2019 – 10 February 2019	12	QF	(United States) Madison Keys	17	Win	6–4, 6–1
Indian Wells Open; Indian Wells, United States; WTA Premier Mandatory; Hard, outdoor; 4 March 2019 – 17 March 2019	–	1R	Bye			
Indian Wells Open; Indian Wells, United States; WTA Premier Mandatory; Hard, outdoor; 4 March 2019 – 17 March 2019	13	2R	(Germany) Tatjana Maria	69	Win	6–4, 6–4
Indian Wells Open; Indian Wells, United States; WTA Premier Mandatory; Hard, outdoor; 4 March 2019 – 17 March 2019	14	3R	(United States) Jennifer Brady (WC)	83	Win	6–3, 6–2
Indian Wells Open; Indian Wells, United States; WTA Premier Mandatory; Hard, outdoor; 4 March 2019 – 17 March 2019	15	4R	(Ukraine) Elina Svitolina (6)	6	Loss	6–7^{(8–10)}, 7–5, 4–6
Miami Open; Key Biscayne, United States; WTA Premier Mandatory; Hard, outdoor; 18 March 2019 – 31 March 2019	–	1R	Bye			
Miami Open; Key Biscayne, United States; WTA Premier Mandatory; Hard, outdoor; 18 March 2019 – 31 March 2019	16	2R	(Ukraine) Dayana Yastremska	37	Win	6–4, 6–1
Miami Open; Key Biscayne, United States; WTA Premier Mandatory; Hard, outdoor; 18 March 2019 – 31 March 2019	17	3R	(Australia) Samantha Stosur	83	Win	6–0, 6–3
Miami Open; Key Biscayne, United States; WTA Premier Mandatory; Hard, outdoor; 18 March 2019 – 31 March 2019	18	4R	(Netherlands) Kiki Bertens (7)	8	Win	4–6, 6–3, 6–2
Miami Open; Key Biscayne, United States; WTA Premier Mandatory; Hard, outdoor; 18 March 2019 – 31 March 2019	19	QF	(Czech Republic) Petra Kvitová (3)	2	Win	7–6^{(8–6)}, 3–6, 6–2
Miami Open; Key Biscayne, United States; WTA Premier Mandatory; Hard, outdoor; 18 March 2019 – 31 March 2019	20	SF	(Estonia) Anett Kontaveit (21)	19	Win	6–3, 6–3
Miami Open; Key Biscayne, United States; WTA Premier Mandatory; Hard, outdoor; 18 March 2019 – 31 March 2019	21	W	(Czech Republic) Karolína Plíšková (5)	7	Win (1)	7–6^{(7–1)}, 6–3
Fed Cup Semifinals; Australia vs. Belarus; Brisbane, Australia; Fed Cup; Hard, outdoor; 20 April 2019 – 21 April 2019	22	SF	(Belarus) Victoria Azarenka	61	Win	7–6^{(7–2)}, 6–3
Fed Cup Semifinals; Australia vs. Belarus; Brisbane, Australia; Fed Cup; Hard, outdoor; 20 April 2019 – 21 April 2019	23	SF	(Belarus) Aryna Sabalenka	10	Win	6–2, 6–2
Madrid Open; Madrid, Spain; WTA Premier Mandatory; Clay, outdoor; 6 May 2019 – 12 May 2019	24	1R	(Australia) Daria Gavrilova	57	Win	6–1, 6–2
Madrid Open; Madrid, Spain; WTA Premier Mandatory; Clay, outdoor; 6 May 2019 – 12 May 2019	25	2R	(United States) Danielle Collins (WC)	30	Win	6–1, 1–6, 6–1
Madrid Open; Madrid, Spain; WTA Premier Mandatory; Clay, outdoor; 6 May 2019 – 12 May 2019	26	3R	(Kazakhstan) Yulia Putintseva	43	Win	4–6, 6–1, 6–2
Madrid Open; Madrid, Spain; WTA Premier Mandatory; Clay, outdoor; 6 May 2019 – 12 May 2019	27	QF	(Romania) Simona Halep (3)	3	Loss	5–7, 5–7
Italian Open; Rome, Italy; WTA Premier 5; Clay, outdoor; 13 May 2019 – 19 May 2019	–	1R	Bye			
Italian Open; Rome, Italy; WTA Premier 5; Clay, outdoor; 13 May 2019 – 19 May 2019	28	2R	(Slovakia) Viktória Kužmová	43	Win	4–6, 6–3, 6–4
Italian Open; Rome, Italy; WTA Premier 5; Clay, outdoor; 13 May 2019 – 19 May 2019	29	3R	(France) Kristina Mladenovic (Q)	63	Loss	2–6, 3–6
French Open; Paris, France; Grand Slam; Hard, outdoor; 27 May 2019 – 9 June 2019	30	1R	(United States) Jessica Pegula	72	Win	6–3, 6–3
French Open; Paris, France; Grand Slam; Hard, outdoor; 27 May 2019 – 9 June 2019	31	2R	(United States) Danielle Collins	36	Win	7–5, 6–1
French Open; Paris, France; Grand Slam; Hard, outdoor; 27 May 2019 – 9 June 2019	32	3R	(Germany) Andrea Petkovic	69	Win	6–3, 6–1
French Open; Paris, France; Grand Slam; Hard, outdoor; 27 May 2019 – 9 June 2019	33	4R	(United States) Sofia Kenin	35	Win	6–3, 3–6, 6–0
French Open; Paris, France; Grand Slam; Hard, outdoor; 27 May 2019 – 9 June 2019	34	QF	(United States) Madison Keys (14)	14	Win	6–3, 7–5
French Open; Paris, France; Grand Slam; Hard, outdoor; 27 May 2019 – 9 June 2019	35	SF	(United States) Amanda Anisimova	51	Win	6–7^{(4–7)}, 6–3, 6–3
French Open; Paris, France; Grand Slam; Hard, outdoor; 27 May 2019 – 9 June 2019	36	W	(Czech Republic) Markéta Vondroušová	38	Win (2)	6–1, 6–3
Birmingham Classic; Birmingham, Great Britain; WTA Premier; Grass, outdoor; 17 June 2019 – 23 June 2019	37	1R	(Croatia) Donna Vekić	22	Win	6–3, 6–4
Birmingham Classic; Birmingham, Great Britain; WTA Premier; Grass, outdoor; 17 June 2019 – 23 June 2019	38	2R	(United States) Jennifer Brady	66	Win	6–3, 6–1
Birmingham Classic; Birmingham, Great Britain; WTA Premier; Grass, outdoor; 17 June 2019 – 23 June 2019	39	QF	(United States) Venus Williams (WC)	55	Win	6–4, 6–3
Birmingham Classic; Birmingham, Great Britain; WTA Premier; Grass, outdoor; 17 June 2019 – 23 June 2019	40	SF	(Czech Republic) Barbora Strýcová (7)	51	Win	6–4, 6–4
Birmingham Classic; Birmingham, Great Britain; WTA Premier; Grass, outdoor; 17 June 2019 – 23 June 2019	41	W	(Germany) Julia Görges (8)	19	Win (3)	6–3, 7–5
The Championships, Wimbledon; London, Great Britain; Grand Slam; Grass, outdoor; 1 July 2019 – 14 July 2019	42	1R	(China) Zheng Saisai	43	Win	6–4, 6–2
The Championships, Wimbledon; London, Great Britain; Grand Slam; Grass, outdoor; 1 July 2019 – 14 July 2019	43	2R	(Belgium) Alison Van Uytvanck	58	Win	6–1, 6–3
The Championships, Wimbledon; London, Great Britain; Grand Slam; Grass, outdoor; 1 July 2019 – 14 July 2019	44	3R	(United Kingdom) Harriet Dart (WC)	182	Win	6–1, 6–1
The Championships, Wimbledon; London, Great Britain; Grand Slam; Grass, outdoor; 1 July 2019 – 14 July 2019	45	4R	(United States) Alison Riske	55	Loss	6–3, 2–6, 3–6
Canadian Open; Toronto, Canada; WTA Premier 5; Hard, outdoor; 5 August 2019 – 11 August 2019	–	1R	Bye			
Canadian Open; Toronto, Canada; WTA Premier 5; Hard, outdoor; 5 August 2019 – 11 August 2019	46	2R	(United States) Sofia Kenin	29	Loss	7–6^{(7–5)}, 3–6, 4–6
Cincinnati Open; Mason, United States; WTA Premier 5; Hard, outdoor; 12 August 2019 – 18 August 2019	–	1R	Bye			
Cincinnati Open; Mason, United States; WTA Premier 5; Hard, outdoor; 12 August 2019 – 18 August 2019	47	2R	(Russia) Maria Sharapova (WC)	97	Win	6–4, 6–1
Cincinnati Open; Mason, United States; WTA Premier 5; Hard, outdoor; 12 August 2019 – 18 August 2019	4	3R	(Estonia) Anett Kontaveit	20	Win	4–6, 7–5, 7–5
Cincinnati Open; Mason, United States; WTA Premier 5; Hard, outdoor; 12 August 2019 – 18 August 2019	49	QF	(Greece) Maria Sakkari	33	Win	5–7, 6–2, 6–0
Cincinnati Open; Mason, United States; WTA Premier 5; Hard, outdoor; 12 August 2019 – 18 August 2019	50	SF	(Russia) Svetlana Kuznetsova (WC)	153	Loss	2–6, 4–6
US Open; New York City, United States; Grand Slam; Hard, outdoor; 26 August 2019 – 8 September 2019	51	1R	(Kazakhstan) Zarina Diyas	80	Win	1–6, 6–3, 6–2
US Open; New York City, United States; Grand Slam; Hard, outdoor; 26 August 2019 – 8 September 2019	52	2R	(United States) Lauren Davis	73	Win	6–2, 7–6^{(7–2)}
US Open; New York City, United States; Grand Slam; Hard, outdoor; 26 August 2019 – 8 September 2019	53	3R	(Greece) Maria Sakkari (30)	29	Win	7–5, 6–3
US Open; New York City, United States; Grand Slam; Hard, outdoor; 26 August 2019 – 8 September 2019	54	4R	(China) Wang Qiang (18)	18	Loss	2–6, 4–6
Wuhan Open; Wuhan, China; WTA Premier 5; Hard, outdoor; 23 September 2019 – 29 September 2019	–	1R	Bye			
Wuhan Open; Wuhan, China; WTA Premier 5; Hard, outdoor; 23 September 2019 – 29 September 2019	55	2R	(France) Caroline Garcia (WC)	30	Win	4–6, 6–4, 6–1
Wuhan Open; Wuhan, China; WTA Premier 5; Hard, outdoor; 23 September 2019 – 29 September 2019	56	3R	(United States) Sofia Kenin (15)	17	Win	6–3, 7–5
Wuhan Open; Wuhan, China; WTA Premier 5; Hard, outdoor; 23 September 2019 – 29 September 2019	57	QF	(Croatia) Petra Martić	22	Win	7–6^{(8–6)}, 3–6, 6–3
Wuhan Open; Wuhan, China; WTA Premier 5; Hard, outdoor; 23 September 2019 – 29 September 2019	58	SF	(Belarus) Aryna Sabalenka (9)	14	Loss	5–7, 4–6
China Open; Beijing, China; WTA Premier Mandatory; Hard, outdoor; 30 September 2019 – 6 October 2019	–	1R	Bye			
China Open; Beijing, China; WTA Premier Mandatory; Hard, outdoor; 30 September 2019 – 6 October 2019	59	2R	(Kazakhstan) Yulia Putintseva	37	Win	6–4, 6–2
China Open; Beijing, China; WTA Premier Mandatory; Hard, outdoor; 30 September 2019 – 6 October 2019	60	3R	(China) Zheng Saisai	39	Win	6–3, 6–7^{(5–7)}, 6–2
China Open; Beijing, China; WTA Premier Mandatory; Hard, outdoor; 30 September 2019 – 6 October 2019	61	QF	(Czech Republic) Petra Kvitová (7)	7	Win	4–6, 6–4, 6–3
China Open; Beijing, China; WTA Premier Mandatory; Hard, outdoor; 30 September 2019 – 6 October 2019	62	SF	(Netherlands) Kiki Bertens (8)	8	Win	6–3, 3–6, 7–6^{(9–7)}
China Open; Beijing, China; WTA Premier Mandatory; Hard, outdoor; 30 September 2019 – 6 October 2019	63	F	(Japan) Naomi Osaka (4)	4	Loss (2)	6–3, 3–6, 2–6
WTA Finals; Shenzhen, China; Year-end championships; Hard, indoor; 27 October 2019 – 3 November 2019	64	RR	(Czech Republic) Petra Kvitová (6)	6	Win	6–4, 6–2
WTA Finals; Shenzhen, China; Year-end championships; Hard, indoor; 27 October 2019 – 3 November 2019	65	RR	(Netherlands) Kiki Bertens (9)	10	Loss	6–3, 3–6, 4–6
WTA Finals; Shenzhen, China; Year-end championships; Hard, indoor; 27 October 2019 – 3 November 2019	66	RR	(Switzerland) Belinda Bencic (7)	7	Win	5–7, 6–1, 6–2
WTA Finals; Shenzhen, China; Year-end championships; Hard, indoor; 27 October 2019 – 3 November 2019	67	SF	(Czech Republic) Karolína Plíšková (2)	2	Win	4–6, 6–2, 6–3
WTA Finals; Shenzhen, China; Year-end championships; Hard, indoor; 27 October 2019 – 3 November 2019	68	W	(Ukraine) Elina Svitolina (8)	8	Win (4)	6–4, 6–3
Fed Cup Finals; Australia vs. France; Perth, Australia; Fed Cup; Hard, outdoor; 9 November 2019 – 10 November 2019	69	F	(France) Caroline Garcia	45	Win	6–0, 6–0
Fed Cup Finals; Australia vs. France; Perth, Australia; Fed Cup; Hard, outdoor; 9 November 2019 – 10 November 2019	70	F	(France) Kristina Mladenovic	40	Loss	6–2, 4–6, 6–7^{(1–7)}

=== Doubles matches ===
Tournament	Match	Round	Opponents	Rank	Result	Score
Australian Open; Melbourne, Australia; Grand Slam; Hard, outdoor; 14 January 2019 – 27 January 2019; Partner: (Belarus) Victoria Azarenka	1	1R	(China) Yang Zhaoxuan / (China) Peng Shuai	24 / 53	Win	7–5, 4–6, 7–5
Australian Open; Melbourne, Australia; Grand Slam; Hard, outdoor; 14 January 2019 – 27 January 2019; Partner: (Belarus) Victoria Azarenka	–	2R	(United States) Jennifer Brady / (United States) Alison Riske	73 / 310	Withdrew	—N/a
Fed Cup Quarterfinals; Australia vs. United States; Asheville, United States; Fed Cup; Hard, indoor; 9 February 2019 – 10 February 2019; Partner: (Australia) Priscilla Hon	2	QF	(United States) Nicole Melichar / (United States) Danielle Collins	13 / 370	Win	6–4, 7–5
Indian Wells Open; Indian Wells, United States; WTA Premier Mandatory; Hard, outdoor; 4 March 2019 – 17 March 2019; Partner: (France) Caroline Garcia	3	1R	(Czech Republic) Kateřina Siniaková / (Czech Republic) Barbora Krejčíková (1)	1 / 2	Loss	2–6, 5–7
Miami Open; Key Biscayne, United States; WTA Premier Mandatory; Hard, outdoor; 18 March 2019 – 31 March 2019; Partner: (Belarus) Victoria Azarenka	4	1R	(Czech Republic) Kateřina Siniaková / (Czech Republic) Barbora Krejčíková (1)	1 / 2	Win	3–6, 6–7^{(1–7)}, [10–7]
Miami Open; Key Biscayne, United States; WTA Premier Mandatory; Hard, outdoor; 18 March 2019 – 31 March 2019; Partner: (Belarus) Victoria Azarenka	5	2R	(Serbia) Aleksandra Krunić / (Russia) Alexandra Panova	60 / 71	Win	6–3, 1–6, [10–7]
Miami Open; Key Biscayne, United States; WTA Premier Mandatory; Hard, outdoor; 18 March 2019 – 31 March 2019; Partner: (Belarus) Victoria Azarenka	6	QF	(Romania) Raluca Olaru / (Croatia) Darija Jurak	36 / 40	Win	6–3, 6–1
Miami Open; Key Biscayne, United States; WTA Premier Mandatory; Hard, outdoor; 18 March 2019 – 31 March 2019; Partner: (Belarus) Victoria Azarenka	7	SF	(Belgium) Elise Mertens / (Belarus) Aryna Sabalenka (21)	10 / 34	Loss	6–7^{(6–8)}, 5–7
Fed Cup Semifinals; Australia vs. Belarus; Brisbane, Australia; Fed Cup; Hard, outdoor; 20 April 2019 – 21 April 2019; Partner: (Australia) Samantha Stosur	8	SF	(Belarus) Aryna Sabalenka / (Belarus) Victoria Azarenka	23 / 99	Win	7–5, 3–6, 6–2
Madrid Open; Madrid, Spain; WTA Premier Mandatory; Clay, outdoor; 6 May 2019 – 12 May 2019; Partner: (Belarus) Victoria Azarenka	9	1R	(Poland) Alicja Rosolska / (China) Yang Zhaoxuan	24 / 32	Win	7–6^{(7–2)}, 6–1
Madrid Open; Madrid, Spain; WTA Premier Mandatory; Clay, outdoor; 6 May 2019 – 12 May 2019; Partner: (Belarus) Victoria Azarenka	10	2R	(Netherlands) Demi Schuurs / (Germany) Anna-Lena Grönefeld (8)	7 / 28	Loss	4–6, 3–6
Italian Open; Rome, Italy; WTA Premier 5; Clay, outdoor; 13 May 2019 – 19 May 2019; Partner: (Belarus) Victoria Azarenka	11	1R	(Australia) Jessica Moore / (Japan) Miyu Kato	52 / 58	Win	7–5, 6–2
Italian Open; Rome, Italy; WTA Premier 5; Clay, outdoor; 13 May 2019 – 19 May 2019; Partner: (Belarus) Victoria Azarenka	12	2R	(Chinese Taipei) Hsieh Su-wei / (Czech Republic) Barbora Strýcová (5)	3 / 19	Win	6–4, 6–3
Italian Open; Rome, Italy; WTA Premier 5; Clay, outdoor; 13 May 2019 – 19 May 2019; Partner: (Belarus) Victoria Azarenka	13	QF	(Belarus) Aliaksandra Sasnovich / (Ukraine) Lesia Tsurenko	32 / 507	Win	6–2, 6–4
Italian Open; Rome, Italy; WTA Premier 5; Clay, outdoor; 13 May 2019 – 19 May 2019; Partner: (Belarus) Victoria Azarenka	14	SF	(Czech Republic) Kateřina Siniaková / (Czech Republic) Barbora Krejčíková (1)	1 / 2	Win	6–4, 6–4
Italian Open; Rome, Italy; WTA Premier 5; Clay, outdoor; 13 May 2019 – 19 May 2019; Partner: (Belarus) Victoria Azarenka	15	W	(Netherlands) Demi Schuurs / (Germany) Anna-Lena Grönefeld (8)	7 / 27	Win (1)	4–6, 6–0, [10–3]
French Open; Paris, France; Grand Slam; Hard, outdoor; 27 May 2019 – 9 June 2019; Partner: (Belarus) Victoria Azarenka	16	1R	(Serbia) Aleksandra Krunić / (Australia) Ajla Tomljanović	71 / 148	Win	6–1, 6–1
French Open; Paris, France; Grand Slam; Hard, outdoor; 27 May 2019 – 9 June 2019; Partner: (Belarus) Victoria Azarenka	17	2R	(Slovakia) Viktória Kužmová / (Switzerland) Belinda Bencic	76 / 109	Win	4–6, 7–6^{(8–6)}, 6–1
French Open; Paris, France; Grand Slam; Hard, outdoor; 27 May 2019 – 9 June 2019; Partner: (Belarus) Victoria Azarenka	18	3R	(China) Zhang Shuai / (Australia) Samantha Stosur (5)	9 / 14	Loss	6–3, 3–6, 2–6
Birmingham Classic; Birmingham, Great Britain; WTA Premier; Grass, outdoor; 17 June 2019 – 23 June 2019; Partner: (Germany) Julia Görges	19	1R	(United States) Kaitlyn Christian / (Slovenia) Dalila Jakupović	43 / 74	Win	6–3, 6–4
Birmingham Classic; Birmingham, Great Britain; WTA Premier; Grass, outdoor; 17 June 2019 – 23 June 2019; Partner: (Germany) Julia Görges	20	QF	(Ukraine) Dayana Yastremska / (United States) Wang Qiang	252 / 377	Win	6–0, 6–3
Birmingham Classic; Birmingham, Great Britain; WTA Premier; Grass, outdoor; 17 June 2019 – 23 June 2019; Partner: (Germany) Julia Görges	–	SF	(Netherlands) Demi Schuurs / (Germany) Anna-Lena Grönefeld (4)	8 / 25	Withdrew	—N/a
The Championships, Wimbledon; London, Great Britain; Grand Slam; Grass, outdoor; 1 July 2019 – 14 July 2019; Partner: (Belarus) Victoria Azarenka	21	1R	(Belarus) Lidziya Marozava / (Australia) Storm Sanders (PR)	48 / 213	Win	6–0, 6–1
The Championships, Wimbledon; London, Great Britain; Grand Slam; Grass, outdoor; 1 July 2019 – 14 July 2019; Partner: (Belarus) Victoria Azarenka	22	2R	(Slovenia) Tamara Zidanšek / (Sweden) Rebecca Peterson	158 / 385	Win	6–2, 6–3
The Championships, Wimbledon; London, Great Britain; Grand Slam; Grass, outdoor; 1 July 2019 – 14 July 2019; Partner: (Belarus) Victoria Azarenka	–	3R	(United States) Bethanie Mattek-Sands / (United States) Danielle Collins (PR)	79 / 247	Withdrew	—N/a
Canadian Open; Toronto, Canada; WTA Premier 5; Hard, outdoor; 5 August 2019 – 11 August 2019; Partner: (Belarus) Victoria Azarenka	23	1R	(Australia) Monique Adamczak / (Australia) Storm Sanders	53 / 162	Win	6–1, 6–2
Canadian Open; Toronto, Canada; WTA Premier 5; Hard, outdoor; 5 August 2019 – 11 August 2019; Partner: (Belarus) Victoria Azarenka	24	2R	(Germany) Julia Görges / (Czech Republic) Karolína Plíšková	155 / 474	Win	6–1, 6–3
Canadian Open; Toronto, Canada; WTA Premier 5; Hard, outdoor; 5 August 2019 – 11 August 2019; Partner: (Belarus) Victoria Azarenka	25	QF	(Chinese Taipei) Hsieh Su-wei / (Belgium) Kirsten Flipkens (4)	5 / 24	Win	4–6, 6–2, [10–5]
Canadian Open; Toronto, Canada; WTA Premier 5; Hard, outdoor; 5 August 2019 – 11 August 2019; Partner: (Belarus) Victoria Azarenka	26	SF	(Czech Republic) Kateřina Siniaková / (Czech Republic) Barbora Krejčíková (1)	8 / 12	Loss	6–3, 3–6, [4–10]
US Open; New York City, United States; Grand Slam; Hard, outdoor; 26 August 2019 – 8 September 2019; Partner: (Belarus) Victoria Azarenka	27	1R	(Romania) Monica Niculescu / (Kazakhstan) Margarita Gasparyan	36 / 81	Win	4–6, 6–1, 6–1
US Open; New York City, United States; Grand Slam; Hard, outdoor; 26 August 2019 – 8 September 2019; Partner: (Belarus) Victoria Azarenka	28	2R	(United States) Abigail Spears / (Ukraine) Nadiia Kichenok	41 / 48	Win	6–3, 3–6, 7–6^{(12–10)}
US Open; New York City, United States; Grand Slam; Hard, outdoor; 26 August 2019 – 8 September 2019; Partner: (Belarus) Victoria Azarenka	29	3R	(United States) Coco Gauff / (United States) Caty McNally (WC)	111 / 140	Win	6–0, 6–1
US Open; New York City, United States; Grand Slam; Hard, outdoor; 26 August 2019 – 8 September 2019; Partner: (Belarus) Victoria Azarenka	30	QF	(France) Kristina Mladenovic / (Hungary) Tímea Babos (1)	2 / 3	Win	2–6, 7–5, 6–1
US Open; New York City, United States; Grand Slam; Hard, outdoor; 26 August 2019 – 8 September 2019; Partner: (Belarus) Victoria Azarenka	31	SF	(Slovakia) Viktória Kužmová / (Belarus) Aliaksandra Sasnovich	52 / 113	Win	6–0, 6–1
US Open; New York City, United States; Grand Slam; Hard, outdoor; 26 August 2019 – 8 September 2019; Partner: (Belarus) Victoria Azarenka	32	F	(Belgium) Elise Mertens / (Belarus) Aryna Sabalenka (4)	7 / 15	Loss (1)	5–7, 5–7
Fed Cup Finals; Australia vs. France; Perth, Australia; Fed Cup; Hard, outdoor; 9 November 2019 – 10 November 2019; Partner: (Australia) Samantha Stosur	33	F	(France) Kristina Mladenovic / (France) Caroline Garcia	2 / 247	Loss	3–6, 4–6

== Tournament schedule ==
=== Singles schedule ===
Date	Tournament	Location	Category	Surface	Previous result	Previous points	New points	Outcome
7 January 2019 – 13 January 2019	Sydney International	Australia	Premier	Hard	Final	305	305	Final lost to (Czech Republic) Petra Kvitová; 6–1, 5–7, 6–7^{(3–7)}
14 January 2019 – 27 January 2019	Australian Open	Australia	Grand Slam	Hard	Third round	130	430	Quarterfinals lost to (Czech Republic) Petra Kvitová; 1–6, 4–6
4 March 2019 – 17 March 2019	Indian Wells Open	United States	Premier Mandatory	Hard	Second round	35	120	Fourth round lost to (Ukraine) Elina Svitolina; 6–7^{(8–10)}, 7–5, 4–6
18 March 2019 – 31 March 2019	Miami Open	United States	Premier Mandatory	Hard	Fourth round	120	1000	Winner defeated (Czech Republic) Karolína Plíšková; 7–6^{(7–1)}, 6–3
6 May 2019 – 12 May 2019	Madrid Open	Spain	Premier Mandatory	Hard	Second round	35	215	Quarterfinals lost to (Romania) Simona Halep; 5–7, 5–7
13 May 2019 – 19 May 2019	Italian Open	Italy	Premier 5	Clay	First round	1	105	Third round lost to (France) Kristina Mladenovic; 2–6, 3–6
27 May 2019 – 9 June 2019	French Open	France	Grand Slam	Clay	Second round	70	2000	Winner defeated (Czech Republic) Markéta Vondroušová; 6–1, 6–3
17 June 2019 – 23 June 2019	Birmingham Classic	Great Britain	Premier	Grass	Second round	55	470	Winner defeated (Germany) Julia Görges; 6–3, 7–5
1 July 2019 – 14 July 2019	Wimbledon Championships	Great Britain	Grand Slam	Grass	Third round	130	240	Fourth round lost to (United States) Alison Riske; 6–3, 2–6, 3–6
5 August 2019 – 11 August 2019	Canadian Open	Canada	Premier 5	Hard	Semifinals	350	1	Second round lost to (United States) Sofia Kenin; 7–6^{(7–5)}, 3–6, 4–6
12 August 2019 – 18 August 2019	Cincinnati Open	United States	Premier 5	Hard	Third round	105	350	Semifinals lost to (Russia) Svetlana Kuznetsova; 2–6, 4–6
26 August 2019 – 8 September 2019	US Open	United States	Grand Slam	Hard	Fourth round	240	240	Fourth round lost to (China) Wang Qiang; 2–6, 4–6
23 September 2019 – 29 September 2019	Wuhan Open	China	Premier 5	Hard	Semifinals	350	350	Semifinals lost to (Belarus) Aryna Sabalenka; 5–7, 4–6
30 September 2019 – 6 October 2019	China Open	China	Premier Mandatory	Hard	Did not play	0	650	Final lost to (Japan) Naomi Osaka; 6–3, 3–6, 2–6
27 October 2019 – 3 November 2019	WTA Finals	China	Year-end championships	Hard (i)	Did not qualify	0	1350	Winner defeated (Ukraine) Elina Svitolina; 6–4, 6–3
Total year-end points							7851	

=== Doubles schedule ===
Date	Tournament	Location	Category	Surface	Previous result	Previous points	New points	Outcome
14 January 2019 – 27 January 2019	Australian Open	Australia	Grand Slam	Hard	Second round	130	130	Second round withdrew against (United States) Jennifer Brady / (United States) Alison Riske; N/A
4 March 2019 – 17 March 2019	Indian Wells Open	United States	Premier; Mandatory	Hard	First round	10	10	First round lost to (Czech Republic) Kateřina Siniaková / (Czech Republic) Barbora Krejčíková; 2–6, 5–7
18 March 2019 – 31 March 2019	Miami Open	United States	Premier; Mandatory	Hard	Winner	1000	350	Semifinals lost to (Belgium) Elise Mertens / (Belarus) Aryna Sabalenka; 6–7^{(6–8)}, 5–7
6 May 2019 – 12 May 2019	Madrid Open	Spain	Premier; Mandatory	Hard	Quarterfinals	215	120	Second round lost to (Netherlands) Demi Schuurs / (Germany) Anna-Lena Grönefeld; 4–6, 3–6
13 May 2019 – 19 May 2019	Italian Open	Italy	Premier 5	Clay	Winner	900	900	Winner defeated (Netherlands) Demi Schuurs / (Germany) Anna-Lena Grönefeld; 4–6, 6–0, [10–3]
27 May 2019 – 9 June 2019	French Open	France	Grand Slam	Clay	First round	10	240	Third round lost to (China) Zhang Shuai / (Australia) Samantha Stosur; 6–3, 3–6, 2–6
17 June 2019 – 23 June 2019	Birmingham Classic	Great Britain	Premier	Grass	First round	1	185	Semifinals withdrew against (Netherlands) Demi Schuurs / (Germany) Anna-Lena Grönefeld; N/A
1 July 2019 – 14 July 2019	Wimbledon Championships	Great Britain	Grand Slam	Grass	Did not play	0	240	Third round withdrew against (United States) Bethanie Mattek-Sands / (United States) Danielle Collins; N/A
5 August 2019 – 11 August 2019	Canadian Open	Canada	Premier 5	Hard	Winner	900	350	Semifinals lost to (Czech Republic) Kateřina Siniaková / (Czech Republic) Barbora Krejčíková; 6–3, 3–6, [4–10]
26 August 2019 – 8 September 2019	US Open	United States	Grand Slam	Hard	Winner	2000	1300	Final lost to (Belgium) Elise Mertens / (Belarus) Aryna Sabalenka; 5–7, 5–7
Total year-end points							3635	

== Yearly records ==
=== Top 10 wins ===
==== Singles ====
#	Opponent	Rank	Tournament	Surface	Round	Score	ABR
1.	(Romania) Simona Halep	No. 1	Sydney International, Australia	Hard	Second round	6–4, 6–4	No. 15
2.	(Netherlands) Kiki Bertens	No. 9	Sydney International, Australia	Hard	Semifinals	6–7^{(4–7)}, 6–4, 7–5	No. 15
3.	(Netherlands) Kiki Bertens	No. 8	Miami Open, United States	Hard	Fourth round	4–6, 6–3, 6–2	No. 11
4.	(Czech Republic) Petra Kvitová	No. 2	Miami Open, United States	Hard	Quarterfinals	7–6^{(8–6)}, 3–6, 6–2	No. 11
5.	(Czech Republic) Karolína Plíšková	No. 7	Miami Open, United States	Hard	Final	7–6^{(7–1)}, 6–3	No. 11
6.	(Belarus) Aryna Sabalenka	No. 10	Fed Cup, Australia	Hard	Semifinals	6–2, 6–2	No. 9
7.	(Czech Republic) Petra Kvitová	No. 7	China Open	Hard	Quarterfinals	4–6, 6–4, 6–3	No. 1
8.	(Netherlands) Kiki Bertens	No. 8	China Open	Hard	Semifinals	6–3, 3–6, 7–6^{(9–7)}	No. 1
9.	(Switzerland) Belinda Bencic	No. 7	WTA Finals, China	Hard (i)	Round robin	5–7, 6–1, 6–2	No. 1
10.	(Czech Republic) Petra Kvitová	No. 6	WTA Finals, China	Hard (i)	Round robin	6–4, 6–2	No. 1
11.	(Czech Republic) Karolína Plíšková	No. 2	WTA Finals, China	Hard (i)	Semifinals	4–6, 6–2, 6–3	No. 1
12.	(Ukraine) Elina Svitolina	No. 8	WTA Finals, China	Hard (i)	Final	6–4, 6–3	No. 1

==== Doubles ====
#	Partner	Opponents	Rank	Tournament	Surface	Round	Score	ABR
1.	(Belarus) Victoria Azarenka	(Czech Republic) Kateřina Siniaková; (Czech Republic) Barbora Krejčíková	No. 1; No. 2	Miami Open, United States	Hard	First round	3–6, 6–7^{(1–7)}, [10–7]	No. 6
2.	(Belarus) Victoria Azarenka	(Chinese Taipei) Hsieh Su-wei; (Czech Republic) Barbora Strýcová	No. 3; No. 19	Italian Open	Clay	Second round	6–4, 6–3	No. 9
3.	(Belarus) Victoria Azarenka	(Czech Republic) Kateřina Siniaková; (Czech Republic) Barbora Krejčíková	No. 1; No. 2	Italian Open	Clay	Semifinals	6–4, 6–4	No. 9
4.	(Belarus) Victoria Azarenka	(Netherlands) Demi Schuurs; (Germany) Anna-Lena Grönefeld	No. 7; No. 27	Italian Open	Clay	Final	4–6, 6–0, [10–3]	No. 9
5.	(Belarus) Victoria Azarenka	(Chinese Taipei) Hsieh Su-wei; (Belgium) Kirsten Flipkens	No. 5; No. 24	Canadian Open	Hard	Quarterfinals	4–6, 6–2, [10–5]	No. 6
6.	(Belarus) Victoria Azarenka	(France) Kristina Mladenovic; (Hungary) Tímea Babos	No. 2; No. 3	US Open	Hard	Quarterfinals	2–6, 7–5, 6–1	No. 9

=== Finals ===
==== Singles: 6 (4 titles, 2 runner-ups) ====
Legend Grand Slam tournaments (1–0) WTA Tour Championships (0–0) WTA Elite Trophy (0–0) Premier Mandatory & Premier 5 (1–1) Premier (1–1) International (0–0)	Finals by surface Hard (2–2) Clay (1–0) Grass (1–0)	Finals by setting Outdoor (3–2) Indoor (1–0)

Result	W–L	Date	Tournament	Tier	Surface	Opponent	Score
Loss	0–1	Jan 2019	Sydney International, Australia	Premier	Hard	(Czech Republic) Petra Kvitová	6–1, 5–7, 6–7^{(3–7)}
Win	1–1	Mar 2019	Miami Open, United States	Premier Mandatory	Hard	(Czech Republic) Karolína Plíšková	7–6^{(7–1)}, 6–3
Win	2–1	Jun 2019	French Open	Grand Slam	Clay	(Czech Republic) Markéta Vondroušová	6–1, 6–3
Win	3–1	Jun 2019	Birmingham Classic, UK	Premier	Grass	(Germany) Julia Görges	6–3, 7–5
Loss	3–2	Oct 2019	China Open	Premier M	Hard	(Japan) Naomi Osaka	6–3, 3–6, 2–6
Win	4–2	Nov 2019	WTA Finals, China	WTA Finals	Hard (i)	(Ukraine) Elina Svitolina	6–4, 6–3

==== Doubles: 2 (1 title, 1 runner-up) ====
Legend Grand Slam tournaments (0–1) WTA Tour Championships (0–0) WTA Elite Trophy (0–0) Premier Mandatory & Premier 5 (1–0) Premier (0–0) International (0–0)	Finals by surface Hard (0–1) Clay (1–0) Grass (0–0)	Finals by setting Outdoor (1–1) Indoor (0–0)

Result	W–L	Date	Tournament	Tier	Surface	Partner	Opponents	Score
Win	1–0	May 2019	Italian Open	Premier 5	Clay	(Belarus) Victoria Azarenka	(Germany) Anna-Lena Grönefeld; (Netherlands) Demi Schuurs	4–6, 6–0, [10–3]
Loss	1–1	Sep 2019	US Open	Grand Slam	Hard	(Belarus) Victoria Azarenka	(Belarus) Aryna Sabalenka; (Belgium) Elise Mertens	5–7, 5–7

=== Earnings ===
#	Tournament	Singles Prize money	Doubles Prize money	Year-to-date
1.	Sydney International	$75,570	$0	$75,570
2.	Australian Open	$342,246	$7,812	$425,628
3.	Indian Wells Open	$91,205	$8,045	$524,878
4.	Miami Open	$1,354,010	$55,930	$1,934,818
5.	Madrid Open	$180,299	$13,171	$2,128,288
6.	Italian Open	$37,034	$92,978	$2,258,300
7.	French Open	$2,649,464	$24,479	$4,932,243
8.	Birmingham Classic	$176,215	$8,020	$5,116,478
9.	Wimbledon Championships	$227,786	$12,295	$5,356,559
10.	Canadian Open	$14,920	$18,657	$5,390,136
11.	Cincinnati Open	$133,850	$0	$5,523,986
12.	US Open	$280,000	$185,000	$5,988,986
13.	Wuhan Open	$130,030	$0	$6,119,016
14.	China Open	$762,265	$0	$6,881,281
15.	WTA Finals	$4,420,000	$0	$11,301,281
Total prize money		$10,874,894	$426,387	$11,301,281
