= 1998 Croatian Bol Ladies Open – Singles =

Singles
- 1998 Croatian Bol Ladies Open

Final
- Champion: (Croatia) Mirjana Lučić
- Runner-up: (United States) Corina Morariu
- Score: 6–2, 6–4

Details
- Draw: 32 (4 Q / 2 WC )
- Seeds: 8

Events
Singles	Doubles
← 1997 ·	Croatian Bol Ladies Open	· 1999 →

The singles division of the 1998 Croatian Bol Ladies Open was played on outdoor clay courts in Bol, Croatia as part of Tier IV of the 1998 WTA Tour. Mirjana Lučić was the defending champion and won in the final 6–2, 6–4 against Corina Morariu.

== Seeds ==
A champion seed is indicated in bold text while text in italics indicates the round in which that seed was eliminated.

1. (South Africa) Joannette Kruger (semifinals)
2. (United States) Mary Joe Fernández (second round)
3. (China) Fang Li (first round)
4. (Croatia) **Mirjana Lučić (champion)**
5. (United States) Corina Morariu (final)
6. (Spain) Gala León García (first round)
7. (Spain) María Sánchez Lorenzo (first round)
8. (Czech Republic) Sandra Kleinová (second round)

== Draw ==
=== Key ===
- Q = Qualifier
- WC = Wild card
- LL = Lucky loser
- Alt = Alternate
- SE = Special exempt
- PR = Protected ranking
- ITF = ITF entry
- JE = Junior exempt
- w/o = Walkover
- r = Retired
- d = Defaulted
- SR = Special ranking

First round
1	(South Africa) **J Kruger**	**6**	**6**
Q	(Kazakhstan) I Selyutina	3	4
(France) **A Mauresmo**	**6**	**7**
LL	(India) N Vaidyanathan	1	5
(Slovakia) K Studeníková	**6**	4	1
Q	(Romania) **R Sandu**	3	**6**	**6**
(Argentina) **P Suárez**	4	**6**	**7**
6	(Spain) G León García	**6**	3	5
4	(Croatia) **M Lučić**	**6**	3	**7**
(Puerto Rico) K Brandi	2	**6**	6
WC	(Croatia) D Krstulović	4	2
Q	(Zimbabwe) **C Black**	**6**	**6**
(Czech Republic) D Chládková	3	6
(Argentina) **M Díaz Oliva**	**6**	**7**
(Italy) L Golarsa	3	1
8	(Czech Republic) **S Kleinová**	**6**	**6**
7	(Spain) M Sánchez Lorenzo	2	4
(Russia) **T Panova**	**6**	**6**
(France) **L Ghirardi**	**7**	5	**6**
WC	(Croatia) J Kostanić	5	**7**	4
Q	(Croatia) **S Talaja**	1	**6**	**6**
(Austria) S Plischke	**6**	2	2
(Slovenia) **T Križan**	**6**	**6**
3	(China) F Li	4	1
5	(United States) **C Morariu**	**6**	**6**
(Spain) C Torrens Valero	4	4
(Czech Republic) L Němečková	2	3
(Japan) **Y Yoshida**	**6**	**6**
(Japan) N Miyagi	1	**7**	1
(Italy) **S Cecchini**	**6**	6	**6**
(Italy) F Lubiani	2	6
2	(United States) **M J Fernández**	**6**	**7**

Second round
1	(South Africa) **J Kruger**	**6**	**6**
(France) A Mauresmo	4	1
Q	(Romania) **R Sandu**	**6**	**7**
(Argentina) P Suárez	2	6
4	(Croatia) **M Lučić**	**6**	**6**
Q	(Zimbabwe) C Black	2	0
(Argentina) **M Díaz Oliva**	**7**	**6**
8	(Czech Republic) S Kleinová	6	1
(Russia) T Panova	4	0
(France) **L Ghirardi**	**6**	**6**
Q	(Croatia) **S Talaja**	**6**	**6**
(Slovenia) T Križan	2	2
5	(United States) **C Morariu**	**6**	**6**
(Japan) Y Yoshida	2	4
(Italy) **S Cecchini**	**5**
2	(United States) M J Fernández	2	r

Quarterfinals
1	(South Africa) **J Kruger**	4	**6**	**6**
Q	(Romania) R Sandu	**6**	3	2
4	(Croatia) **M Lučić**	**6**	**6**
(Argentina) M Díaz Oliva	2	3
(France) L Ghirardi	5	2
Q	(Croatia) **S Talaja**	**7**	**6**
5	(United States) **C Morariu**	**6**	**6**
(Italy) S Cecchini	3	1

Semifinals
1	(South Africa) J Kruger	2	1
4	(Croatia) **M Lučić**	**6**	**6**
Q	(Croatia) S Talaja	**6**	4	3
5	(United States) **C Morariu**	4	**6**	**6**

Final
4	(Croatia) **Mirjana Lučić**	**6**	**6**
5	(United States) Corina Morariu	2	4
