= Mirjana Lučić-Baroni =

Croatian tennis player (born 1982)

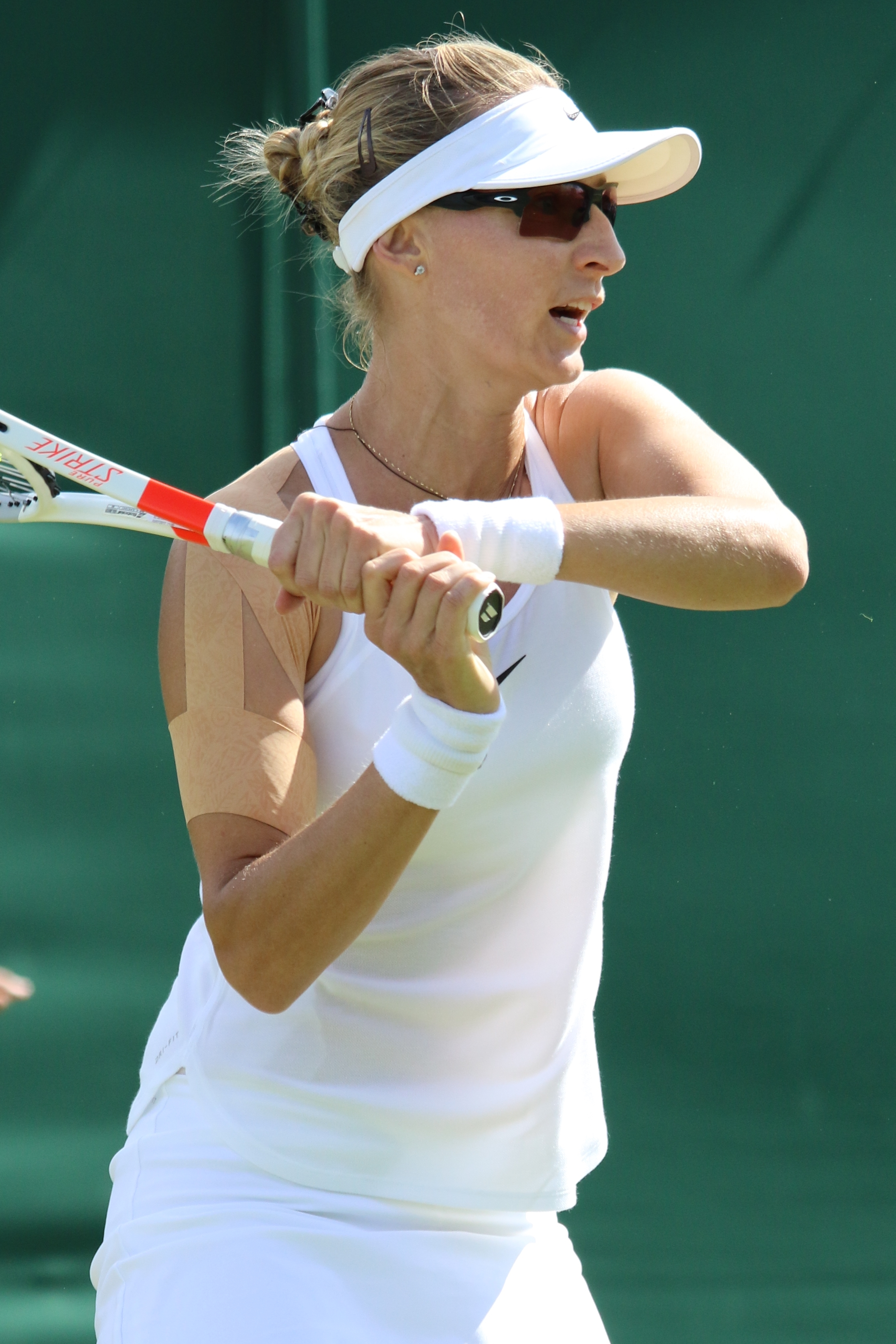
- Lučić-Baroni at the 2017 Wimbledon Championships
- Country (sports): Croatia
- Residence: Sarasota, Florida, US
- Born: 9 March 1982 (age 44) Dortmund, West Germany
- Height: 1.81 m (5 ft 11 in)
- Turned pro: 26 April 1997
- Retired: 2018 (last match played)
- Plays: Right (two-handed backhand)
- Prize money: $4,253,458

Singles
- Career record: 401–326
- Career titles: 3 WTA, 4 ITF
- Highest ranking: No. 20 (1 May 2017)

Grand Slam singles results
- Australian Open: SF (2017)
- French Open: 3R (2001, 2015)
- Wimbledon: SF (1999)
- US Open: 4R (2014)

Doubles
- Career record: 85–87
- Career titles: 3 WTA, 3 ITF
- Highest ranking: No. 19 (26 October 1998)

Grand Slam doubles results
- Australian Open: W (1998)
- French Open: 3R (2013, 2016)
- Wimbledon: QF (2013)
- US Open: 3R (2013)

Grand Slam mixed doubles results
- Wimbledon: F (1998)

Team competitions
- Fed Cup: 14–3

Mirjana Lučić-Baroni (née Lučić; Croatian pronunciation: [mǐrjana lûtʃitɕ, - lǔː-, - lûː-]; born 9 March 1982) is a Croatian former professional tennis player. She enjoyed a meteoric rise on the WTA Tour in the late 1990s, during which she set various "youngest-ever" records. She captured the women's doubles title at the 1998 Australian Open when she was 15 years old, partnered with Martina Hingis. She also won the first ever professional tournament she entered, the 1997 Croatian Ladies Open, and defended it the following year at age 16, making her the youngest player in history to successfully defend a title. She then reached the semifinals of the 1999 Wimbledon Championships, beating world No. 4, Monica Seles, and eighth seed Nathalie Tauziat, the previous year's finalist, before she lost to Steffi Graf in three sets.

After toiling on the ITF Women's Circuit through much of the next decade, Lučić re-emerged as a WTA regular following the 2010 season. In September 2014, she upset world No. 2 Simona Halep in the third round of the US Open. The following week, she beat Venus Williams at the Tournoi de Québec final to claim the title, which set the record for the longest gap between titles in the Open Era. In January 2017, almost 18 years after her first Grand Slam semifinal, Lučić-Baroni reached the semifinals of the Australian Open, upsetting two top-5-ranked players before losing to Serena Williams. Three months later, she entered the singles rankings' top 20 for the first time in her career. However, Lučić-Baroni has been inactive since January 2018 due to a shoulder injury.

== Career ==
=== Junior success ===
Lučić began playing tennis at age 4 by hiding in the car when her older sister went to tennis classes and then sneaking into the lessons herself. As a junior player, she won the girls' singles title at the US Open in 1996, and singles and doubles crowns at the Australian Open in 1997, becoming the third player in the Open Era to win two junior Grand Slam tournament singles titles before her 15th birthday (others being Martina Hingis and Jennifer Capriati).

=== 1997–98: Major title ===
Lučić turned professional in April 1997 at the age of 15. One week after turning pro, she won the first WTA Tour event she played in at Bol, becoming the youngest player to win a title in her tour-level debut. She then reached the final of her second career event in Strasbourg, where she lost to Steffi Graf.

In 1998, playing in her first tour doubles event, Lučić became the youngest player in history to win a title at the Australian Open at the age of 15 years, 10 months and 21 days, when she and Hingis won the women's doubles title. The win made Lučić the first player to win both the first singles and doubles events they had ever played in on the WTA Tour. She went on to win the second doubles event of her career when she partnered with Hingis to win the Pan Pacific Open in Tokyo. Later that year, Lučić defended her singles title at Bol, becoming the youngest player ever to defend a tour title at age 16 years, one month and 24 days. Partnering with Mahesh Bhupathi, she also finished runner-up in the 1998 mixed-doubles event of Wimbledon.

=== 1999: Wimbledon semifinal, personal problems ===
In 1999, Lučić achieved her career-best Grand Slam singles performance when she reached the semifinals at Wimbledon, before losing in three sets to Graf. She beat Erika deLone and Mariana Díaz Oliva before she beat world No. 4 and nine-time Grand Slam champion Monica Seles in the third round. She saw off Tamarine Tanasugarn and then beat 1998 Wimbledon finalist Nathalie Tauziat in the quarterfinals, after Tauziat served for the match twice in the third set.

After 1999, Lučić suffered a series of personal and financial problems and failed to make any further significant impact on the tour. She said that she had been abused by her father, Marinko, from early childhood. She continued to compete until the 2003 US Open, then proceeded to take an extended hiatus from competition; her career-high rankings were world No. 32 in singles and No. 19 in doubles (both achieved in 1998). She played only two tournaments in the 2004, 2005, and 2006 seasons combined.

=== 2007–08: Return to tour ===
Lučić gave an interview in the New York Daily News in April 2006, explaining why she stopped playing and describing her life with an abusive father, vowing that would not stop her and she would continue to fight to the end. She had been training with a new coach, Ivan Beroš, and said she was fit and ready to continue tennis.

As a wildcard in the qualifying draw of the Cellular South Cup in Memphis in February, Lučić won one match (defeating Melanie Oudin) before losing in the second round to Natalie Grandin. She was also awarded a wildcard to the Indian Wells Open in March, where she again won her first match before losing in the second round.

She also received a wildcard to the Tiro A Volo tournament in Rome, where she lost in the first round to Karin Knapp. That was her third tournament within the previous 12 months, and she received her first WTA ranking (No. 524) since her return to the professional tour.

Even though she lost the first round to Knapp in the $100k Rome Challenger, she received a qualifying wildcard for the WTA Tour tournament in May at the same city and beat the 65th-ranked player in the world, Elena Vesnina. She then went on to lose to Catalina Castaño in the second round. Her ranking fell to 444 with the result.

Lučić played a mixture of ITF and WTA qualifiers in 2008, her best result reaching the quarterfinals in Florence in May. In September 2008, Mirjana started working with her new coach Alberto Gutierrez, planning to play a full schedule the following year.

=== 2009–11 ===
In the 2009 season, she was given a wildcard into the Auckland Open in New Zealand. In her first WTA Tour main-draw match since 2007 Indian Wells, she lost to Anne Keothavong in the first round.

Lučić then continued to toil on the ITF Circuit for several years prior to mounting somewhat of a comeback in the 2010 season. During that year, Lučić won her first title in 12 years at a $25k event in Jackson, Florida on 11 April. Shortly after, Lučić qualified for the WTA event in Birmingham, going on to win her first main-draw match since 2007 in Indian Wells, this time over Colombian Mariana Duque. She continued her good form as she defeated fellow Croatian player Karolina Šprem in the second round. She was beaten by top-20 player Aravane Rezaï of France in the third round. Lučić then competed in the Wimbledon qualifying tournament in Roehampton. She won her first two rounds and beat Michaëlla Krajicek in the third round to qualify for the main draw of Wimbledon, her first Grand Slam since the 2002 US Open. After a good showing, she fell to 14th seed Victoria Azarenka in the first round on centre court.

After Wimbledon, Lučić moved onto the European summer clay-court events. She failed to qualify for the Swedish Open in Båstad but the following week came through three rounds of qualifying at Palermo event, and won her first round match, defeating Pauline Parmentier recovering from a 0–4 third set deficit and saving three match points. She then fell to third seed Sara Errani in the second round recovering a 2–4 deficit to force a tie-break before falling 0–6, 6–7. Her ranking rose to No. 151.

Following Palermo, Lučić returned to the United States for the summer hard-court season. Her first event was the Premier event in Stanford, the Silicon Valley Classic. Seeded fifth in the qualifying draw, Lučić defeated both Heidi El Tabakh and Tamaryn Hendler in straight sets, before repeating her Wimbledon victory over Michaëlla Krajicek with a straight-sets win to qualify for the main draw where she lost to Maria Kirilenko.

In the US Open, after winning three qualifying matches to enter the main draw, she beat Alicia Molik to set up a second round clash with No. 4 seed Jelena Janković. Lučić lost in three sets. Even with this defeat, this was her best performance in a Grand Slam championship for nearly a decade.

Lučić started out the 2011 season poorly with a string of early losses on both the WTA Tour and ITF Circuit early in the year. Her fortunes began to change during the clay court season where Lučić reached her first tour quarterfinal in over ten years at the Strasbourg event, losing to Anabel Medina Garrigues. She married restaurateur Daniele Baroni in December 2011.

=== 2012 ===
Lučić-Baroni began the new season losing in qualifying at Brisbane and Sydney in January. She also failed to qualify for the Australian Open. She struggled to find her form, losing early at the tournaments in Midland and Memphis, as well as the Premier line-up events of Indian Wells, Miami and Charleston. She also lost in the first round at Roland Garros to Svetlana Kuznetsova.

Lučić-Baroni had a breakthrough run at Wimbledon, reaching the third round as a qualifier. She stunned ninth seed Marion Bartoli en route to the second round. However, her run was ended by Roberta Vinci in a tight match.

=== 2014: US Open fourth round, first titles in 16 years ===
At the Wimbledon Championships, Lučić-Baroni faced former No. 1 Victoria Azarenka in the first round but lost to the Belarusian in straight sets, after having set points in the second set.

A few weeks later, a resurgent Lučić-Baroni made major waves at the US Open. She defeated No. 25 seed Garbiñe Muguruza in the first round, and Shahar Pe'er in the second round to gain a berth in the third round for the first time since 1998. She then pulled off a huge upset, stunning second-seed Simona Halep in straight sets to win a spot in the round of 16—the best result of her career at this tournament, and her best showing at a Grand Slam since reaching the semifinals at Wimbledon in 1999. She went on to lose this round to 13th seed Sara Errani in three sets.

However, only two weeks later, she entered the Quebec City event and reached the singles final, where she pulled off another major upset by beating Venus Williams on 14 September, setting a record for the longest gap between titles in WTA history, as her previous win happened 16 years and four months earlier at the 1998 Bol Ladies Open. In addition, paired with Czech player Lucie Hradecká, she won the doubles final of the tournament on the same day.

=== 2015–16 ===
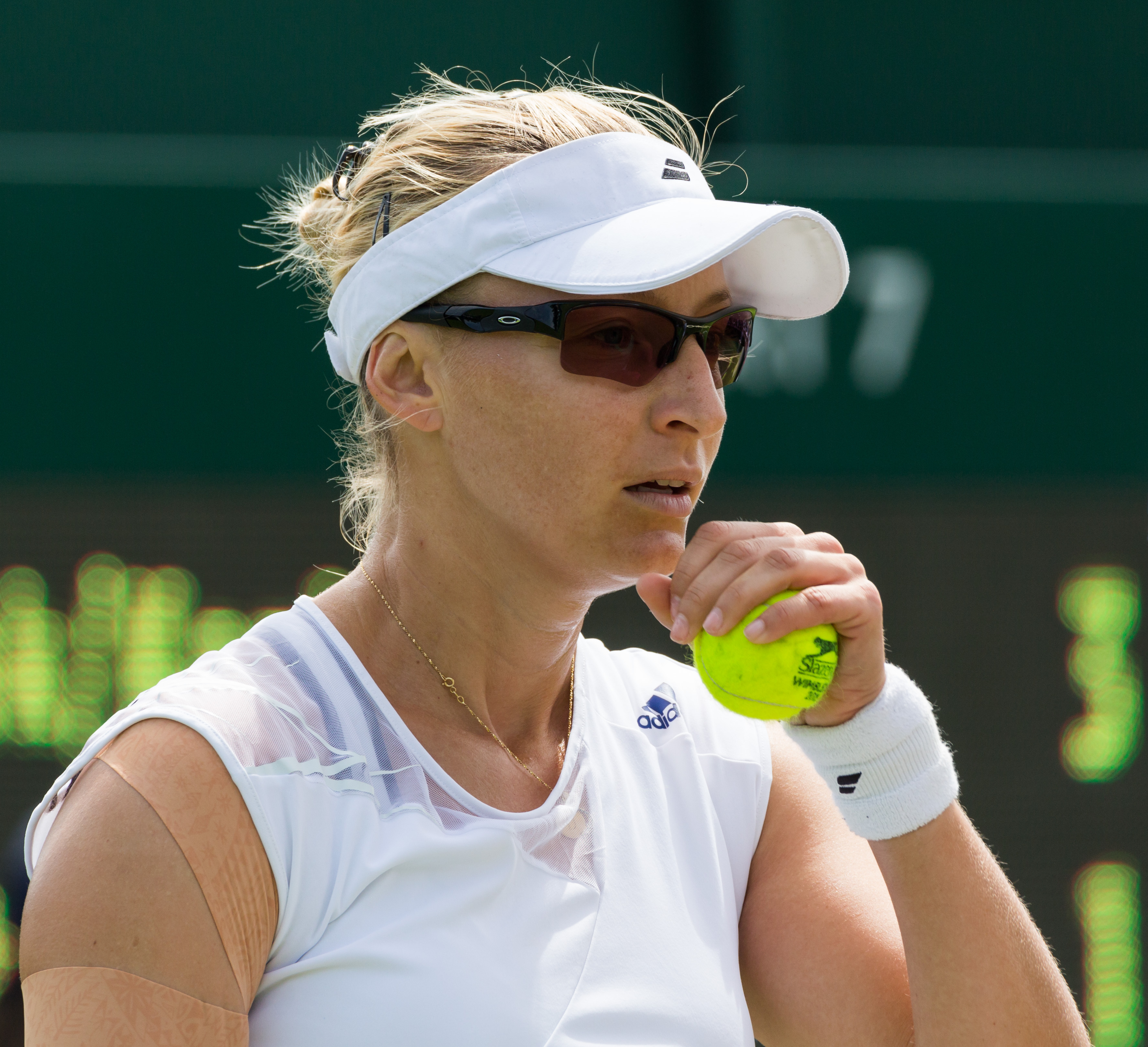
Lučić-Baroni at the 2015 Wimbledon Championships

In 2015, Lučić-Baroni had a second consecutive finish in the top 100 of the WTA rankings, ending the season ranked No. 67. Her best performance was reaching the semifinals in Québec City, losing to sixth seed and eventual champion Annika Beck in three sets.

In 2016, she reached the final at the Internationaux de Strasbourg, where she lost in straight sets to 10th seed Caroline Garcia.

=== 2017: Australian Open semifinal and career-high ranking ===
Entering ranked 79 in the world at the Australian Open, Lučić-Baroni defeated Wang Qiang, third seed Agnieszka Radwańska, Maria Sakkari, qualifier Jennifer Brady and fifth seed Karolína Plíšková to make her first Australian Open semifinal and her first semifinal appearance at a major since for 18 years ago. She lost in the last four to six-time champion and second seed Serena Williams.

In March, as top seed she reached the semifinals at the Abierto Mexicano retiring due to illness, after losing the first five games of her match against seventh seed and eventual champion Lesia Tsurenko.

The following month at the Charleston Open, Lučić-Baroni made it through to the semifinals, at which point she was defeated by Jeļena Ostapenko in three sets.

On 1 May, she entered the WTA top-20 for the first time.

=== 2018 ===
At the Brisbane International, Lučić-Baroni lost in the second round to Alizé Cornet. Seeded 28th, she defeated Shelby Rogers in the first round at the Australian Open, before losing to Aliaksandra Sasnovich.

=== 2021: Comeback plans ===
In March 2021, Lučić-Baroni announced her continued plans for a comeback in order to conclude her career on her own terms.

== Performance timelines ==
Key
W	F	SF	QF	#R	RR	Q#	P#	DNQ	A	Z#	PO	G	S	B	NMS	NTI	P	NH

(W) winner; (F) finalist; (SF) semifinalist; (QF) quarterfinalist; (#R) rounds 4, 3, 2, 1; (RR) round-robin stage; (Q#) qualification round; (P#) preliminary round; (DNQ) did not qualify; (A) absent; (Z#) Davis/Fed Cup Zonal Group (with number indication) or (PO) play-off; (G) gold, (S) silver or (B) bronze Olympic/Paralympic medal; (NMS) not a Masters tournament; (NTI) not a Tier I tournament; (P) postponed; (NH) not held; (SR) strike rate (events won / competed); (W–L) win–loss record.
To avoid confusion and double counting, these charts are updated at the conclusion of a tournament or when the player's participation has ended.

Win–loss includes only WTA Tour and Grand Slam tournaments main-draw results.

=== Singles ===
Tournament	1997	1998	1999	2000	2001	2002	2003	2004	2005	2006	2007	2008	2009	2010	2011	2012	2013	2014	2015	2016	2017	2018	SR	W–L
Grand Slam tournaments
Australian Open	A	2R	1R	1R	A	A	A	A	A	A	A	A	A	A	1R	Q2	1R	1R	1R	1R	SF	2R	0 / 10	7–10
French Open	A	A	1R	1R	3R	2R	Q2	A	A	A	A	A	A	A	1R	1R	1R	1R	3R	2R	1R	A	0 / 11	6–11
Wimbledon	A	2R	SF	2R	Q1	A	Q3	A	A	A	A	A	A	1R	1R	3R	2R	1R	2R	1R	1R	A	0 / 11	11–11
US Open	3R	3R	2R	1R	Q2	1R	Q1	A	A	A	A	A	A	2R	2R	1R	1R	4R	1R	2R	2R	A	0 / 13	12–13
Win–loss	2–1	4–3	6–4	1–4	2–1	1–2	0–0	0–0	0–0	0–0	0–0	0–0	0–0	1–2	1–4	2–3	1–4	3–4	3–4	2–4	6–4	1–1	0 / 45	36–45
Premier Mandatory tournaments
Indian Wells	A	1R	1R	3R	A	1R	1R	A	A	A	2R	A	A	A	Q2	Q1	2R	Q1	1R	1R	2R	A	0 / 10	3–10
Miami	A	2R	3R	1R	1R	1R	A	A	A	A	A	A	A	A	Q1	Q2	Q1	Q2	1R	1R	QF	A	0 / 8	6–8
Madrid	Not Held												A	A	Q1	A	Q1	A	1R	2R	1R	A	0 / 3	1–3
Beijing	Not Held / Not Tier 1												A	A	A	A	A	A	3R	1R	A	A	0 / 2	1–2
Premier 5 tournaments
Dubai / Doha	Not Held / Not Tier 1											A	A	A	A	A	A	3R	1R	A	A	A	0 / 2	2–2
Rome	A	SF	A	1R	A	A	A	A	A	A	Q2	A	A	A	Q1	1R	Q1	Q1	Q1	Q1	3R	A	0 / 4	6–4
Canada	A	A	3R	A	A	A	A	A	A	A	A	A	A	A	Q1	Q3	A	Q1	2R	2R	1R	A	0 / 4	4–4
Cincinnati	Not Held / Not Tier 1												A	A	Q1	Q1	A	A	2R	A	1R	A	0 / 2	0–2
Tokyo / Wuhan	A	1R	A	A	A	A	A	A	A	A	A	A	A	A	A	Q1	A	A	2R	1R	A	A	0 / 3	1–3
Career statistics
Titles / Finals	1 / 2	1 / 1	0 / 0	0 / 0	0 / 0	0 / 0	0 / 0	0 / 0	0 / 0	0 / 0	0 / 0	0 / 0	0 / 0	0 / 0	0 / 0	0 / 0	0 / 0	1 / 1	0 / 0	0 / 1	0 / 0	0 / 0	3 / 5	
Overall win–loss	12–3	15–11	11–13	2–12	2–3	1–6	0–2	0–0	0–0	0–0	1–1	0–0	0–1	5–6	8–14	7–12	8–11	12–8	16–26	14–18	20–16	2–3	136–166	
Year-end ranking	52	51	50	207	189	202	335	–	–	–	454	423	288	105	116	108	104	61	67	81	32	343	45%	

=== Doubles ===
Tournaments	1998	1999	2000	2001	2002	2003–07	2008	2009	2010	2011	2012	2013	2014	2015	2016	2017	2018	SR	W–L
Grand Slam tournaments
Australian Open	W	1R	2R	A	A	A	A	A	A	A	A	3R	2R	1R	3R	QF	1R	1 / 9	14–8
French Open	A	A	A	A	A	A	A	A	A	2R	A	3R	1R	A	3R	2R	A	0 / 5	6–5
Wimbledon	A	A	A	A	A	A	A	A	A	A	2R	QF	2R	1R	1R	2R	A	0 / 6	6–5
US Open	1R	1R	A	A	A	A	A	A	A	1R	1R	3R	1R	1R	2R	1R	A	0 / 9	3–9
Win–loss	6–1	0–2	1–1	0–0	0–0	0–0	0–0	0–0	0–0	1–2	1–2	8–4	2–3	0–3	5–4	5–4	0–1	1 / 29	29–27
Premier Mandatory tournaments
Indian Wells	SF	1R	1R	A	A	A	A	A	A	A	A	2R	2R	A	A	2R	A	0 / 6	5–6
Miami	3R	A	2R	A	A	A	A	A	A	A	A	1R	2R	A	A	1R	A	0 / 5	3–5
Madrid	Not Held							A	A	A	A	2R	A	A	A	A	A	0 / 1	1–1
Beijing	Not Held / Not Tier 1							A	A	A	A	A	A	A	A	A	A	0 / 0	0–0
Premier 5 tournaments
Dubai / Doha	Not Held / Not Tier 1						A	A	A	A	A	A	2R	A	A	A	A	0 / 1	1–0
Rome	A	A	A	A	A	A	A	A	A	1R	A	QF	2R	A	A	A	A	0 / 3	3–3
Canada	A	A	A	A	A	A	A	A	A	A	A	A	1R	A	A	A	A	0 / 1	0–1
Cincinnati	Not Held / Not Tier 1							A	A	A	A	1R	1R	A	A	A	A	0 / 2	0–2
Tokyo / Wuhan	W	A	A	A	A	A	A	A	A	A	A	A	A	A	A	A	A	1 / 1	4–0
Career statistics
Titles / Finals	2 / 3	0 / 0	0 / 0	0 / 0	0 / 0	0 / 0	0 / 0	0 / 0	0 / 0	0 / 0	0 / 0	0 / 0	1 / 1	0 / 0	0 / 0	0 / 0	0 / 0	3 / 4	
Overall win–loss	18–4	2–5	2–4	0–2	0–1	0–0	1–2	0–0	0–0	2–6	1–4	15–15	13–15	1–6	5–4	6–7	0–1	66–76	
Year-end ranking	20	198	255	431	–	–	568	–	–	248	224	37	76	457	116	81	1154	46%	

== Grand Slam finals ==
=== Doubles: 1 (title) ===
Result	Year	Championship	Surface	Partner	Opponents	Score
Win	1998	Australian Open	Hard	(Switzerland) Martina Hingis	(United States) Lindsay Davenport (Belarus) Natasha Zvereva	6–4, 2–6, 6–3

=== Mixed doubles: 1 (runner-up) ===
Result	Year	Championship	Surface	Partner	Opponents	Score
Loss	1998	Wimbledon	Grass	(India) Mahesh Bhupathi	(United States) Serena Williams (Belarus) Max Mirnyi	4–6, 4–6

== WTA Tour finals ==
=== Singles: 5 (3 titles, 2 runner-ups) ===
Legend Tier I / Premier M & Premier 5 Tier II / Premier Tier III, IV & V / International (3–2)	Finals by surface Clay (2–2) Carpet (1–0)

Result	W–L	Date	Tournament	Tier	Surface	Opponent	Score
Win	1–0	May 1997	Bol Open, Croatia	Tier IV	Clay	(United States) Corina Morariu	7–5, 6–7^{(4–7)}, 7–6^{(7–5)}
Loss	1–1	May 1997	Internationaux de Strasbourg, France	Tier III	Clay	(Germany) Steffi Graf	2–6, 5–7
Win	2–1	May 1998	Bol Open, Croatia	Tier IV	Clay	(United States) Corina Morariu	6–4, 6–2
Win	3–1	Sep 2014	Tournoi de Québec, Canada	International	Carpet (i)	(United States) Venus Williams	6–4, 6–3
Loss	3–2	May 2016	Internationaux de Strasbourg, France	International	Clay	(France) Caroline Garcia	4–6, 1–6

=== Doubles: 4 (3 titles, 1 runner-up) ===
Legend Grand Slam tournaments (1–0) Tier I / Premier M & Premier 5 (1–0) Tier II / Premier (0–0) Tier III, IV & V / International (1–1)	Finals by surface Hard (1–0) Clay (0–1) Carpet (2–0)

Result	W–L	Date	Tournament	Tier	Surface	Partner	Opponents	Score
Win	1–0	Feb 1998	Australian Open	Grand Slam	Hard	(Switzerland) Martina Hingis	(United States) Lindsay Davenport (Belarus) Natasha Zvereva	6–4, 2–6, 6–3
Win	2–0	Feb 1998	Pan Pacific Open, Japan	Tier I	Carpet (i)	(Switzerland) Martina Hingis	(United States) Lindsay Davenport (Belarus) Natasha Zvereva	7–5, 6–4
Loss	2–1	May 1998	Bol Open, Croatia	Tier IV	Clay	(South Africa) Joannette Kruger	(Argentina) Laura Montalvo (Argentina) Paola Suárez	w/o
Win	3–1	Sep 2014	Tournoi de Québec, Canada	International	Carpet (i)	(Czech Republic) Lucie Hradecká	(Germany) Julia Görges (Czech Republic) Andrea Hlaváčková	6–3, 7–6^{(10–8)}

== ITF Circuit finals ==
$100,000 tournaments
$75,000 tournaments
$50,000 tournaments
$25,000 tournaments
$10,000 tournaments

=== Singles: 7 (4–3) ===
Outcome	No.	Date	Tournament	Surface	Opponent	Score
Runner-up	1.	15 December 1996	ITF Salzburg, Austria	Carpet (i)	(United States) Chanda Rubin	1–6, 2–6
Runner-up	2.	22 June 1997	ITF Marseille, France	Clay	(France) Amelie Cocheteux	6–4, 5–7, 4–6
Winner	1.	3 August 1997	ITF Makarska, Croatia	Clay	(Austria) Sandra Dopfer	6–1, 6–4
Runner-up	3.	1 November 2009	ITF Bayamón, Puerto Rico	Hard	(Paraguay) Rossana de los Ríos	3–6, 4–6
Winner	2.	11 April 2010	ITF Jackson, United States	Clay	(United States) Jamie Hampton	7–5, 6–3
Winner	3.	26 September 2010	ITF Albuquerque, United States	Hard	(United States) Lindsay Lee-Waters	6–1, 6–4
Winner	4.	13 October 2013	ITF Joué-lès-Tours, France	Hard (i)	(Belgium) An-Sophie Mestach	6–4, 6–2

=== Doubles: 3 (3–0) ===
Outcome	No.	Date	Tournament	Surface	Partner	Opponents	Score
Winner	1.	15 December 1996	ITF Salzburg, Austria	Carpet (i)	(United States) Chanda Rubin	(Germany) Adriana Barna (Germany) Anca Barna	6–3, 6–2
Winner	2.	4 November 2012	ITF New Braunfels, United States	Hard	(Russia) Elena Bovina	(Colombia) Mariana Duque Mariño (Venezuela) Adriana Pérez	6–3, 4–6, [10–8]
Winner	3.	10 February 2013	Midland Classic, United States	Hard (i)	(Hungary) Melinda Czink	(Brazil) Maria Fernanda Alves (United Kingdom) Samantha Murray	5–7, 6–4, [10–7]

== Head-to-head records ==
=== Record against top 10 players ===
**Player**	**Record**	**Win%**	**Hard**	**Clay**	**Grass**	**Carpet**	**Last match**
Number 1 ranked players							
**(Romania) Simona Halep**	2–0	100%	1–0	1–0	–	–	Won (7–5, 6–1) at 2015 French Open
(United States) Monica Seles	1–0	100%	–	–	1–0	–	Won (7–6^{(7–4)}, 7–6^{(7–4)}) at 1999 Wimbledon
(Serbia) Ana Ivanovic	1–1	50%	–	1–0	0–1	–	Lost (3–6, 4–6) at 2011 Birmingham
**(Czech Republic) Karolína Plíšková**	3–4	43%	2–4	–	1–0	–	Lost (3–6, 4–6) at 2017 Miami
**(Spain) Garbiñe Muguruza**	1–2	33%	1–1	–	0–1	–	Lost (6–1, 2–6, 1–6) at 2015 Beijing
(Russia) Maria Sharapova	1–2	33%	–	1–2	–	–	Won (6–4, 3–6, 1–2, ret.) at 2017 Rome
**(United States) Venus Williams**	1–2	33%	0–2	–	–	1–0	Won (6–4, 6–3) at 2014 Quebec City
**(Belarus) Victoria Azarenka**	0–2	0%	–	–	0–2	–	Lost (3–6, 5–7) at 2014 Wimbledon
(United States) Jennifer Capriati	0–1	0%	–	0–1	–	–	Lost (3–6, 1–6) at 2001 French Open
(Germany) Steffi Graf	0–3	0%	0–1	0–1	0–1	–	Lost (7–6^{(7–3)}, 4–6, 3–6) at 1999 Wimbledon
(Switzerland) Martina Hingis	0–2	0%	0–1	0–1	–	–	Lost (1–6, 2–6) at 2000 Australian Open
(Serbia) Jelena Janković	0–1	0%	0–1	–	–	–	Lost (4–6, 6–3, 2–6) at 2010 US Open
**(Germany) Angelique Kerber**	0–4	0%	0–4	–	–	–	Lost (2–6, 6–7^{(6–8)}) at 2016 US Open
**(Japan) Naomi Osaka**	0–1	0%	–	0–1	–	–	Lost (3–6, 3–6) at 2016 French Open
(United States) Serena Williams	0–3	0%	0–2	–	0–1	–	Lost (2–6, 1–6) at 2017 Australian Open
**(Denmark) Caroline Wozniacki**	0–2	0%	0–2	–	–	–	Lost (4–6, 4–6) at 2016 Monterrey
Number 2 ranked players							
(Estonia) Anett Kontaveit	1–1	50%	1–0	0–1	–	–	Won (6–4, 6–7^{(3–7)}, 6–3) at 2017 New Haven
(Poland) Agnieszka Radwańska	2–2	50%	2–1	–	0–1	–	Won (6–0, 6–3) at 2017 Miami
**(Russia) Svetlana Kuznetsova**	0–1	0%	–	0–1	–	–	Lost (1–6, 3–6) at 2012 French Open
**(Czech Republic) Petra Kvitová**	0–1	0%	0–1	–	–	–	Lost (1–6, ret.) at 2018 Sydney
(China) Li Na	0–1	0%	–	0–1	–	–	Lost (1–6, 2–6) at 2013 Stuttgart
(Czech Republic) Jana Novotná	0–1	0%	0–1	–	–	–	Lost (2–6, 7–6^{(7–3)}, 3–6) at 1997 US Open
Number 3 ranked players							
**(United States) Jessica Pegula**	1–0	100%	1–0	–	–	–	Won (6–3, 6–7^{(2–7)}, 6–0) at 2013 Indian Wells Qualifying
(France) Mary Pierce	1–0	100%	–	1–0	–	–	Won (7–5, 6–4) at 1998 Rome
(France) Nathalie Tauziat	2–0	100%	–	1–0	1–0	–	Won (4–6, 6–4, 7–5) at 1999 Wimbledon
**(Greece) Maria Sakkari**	1–1	50%	1–1	–	–	–	Won (3–6, 6–2, 6–3) at 2017 Australian Open
(South Africa) Amanda Coetzer	1–2	33%	0–2	1–0	–	–	Lost (6–4, 6–7^{(1–7)}, 2–6) at 1999 Toronto
Number 4 ranked players							
(Japan) Kimiko Date-Krumm	1–0	100%	1–0	–	–	–	Won (2–6, 6–3, 6–2) at 2014 Sydney Qualifying
(United Kingdom) Johanna Konta	1–0	100%	1–0	–	–	–	Won (4–6, 6–2, 7–5) at 2016 Acapulco
(Netherlands) Kiki Bertens	1–1	50%	0–1	1–0	–	–	Won (7–6^{(7–5)}, 6–4) at 2017 Charleston
(Federal Republic of Yugoslavia) / (Australia) Jelena Dokic	1–1	50%	–	1–1	–	–	Won (6–2, 6–2) at 2011 Strasbourg
(Australia) Samantha Stosur	1–1	50%	1–1	–	–	–	Won (6–2, 6–1) at 2015 Wuhan
**(Switzerland) Belinda Bencic**	1–2	33%	1–1	–	0–1	–	Won (7–5, 6–4) at 2017 Acapulco
(Slovakia) Dominika Cibulková	0–5	0%	0–2	0–1	0–2	–	Lost (5–7, 3–6) at 2016 Wimbledon
**(France) Caroline Garcia**	0–5	0%	0–3	0–2	–	–	Lost (2–6, 4–6) at 2016 Wuhan
(Germany) Anke Huber	0–1	0%	–	–	–	0–1	Lost (2–6, 2–6) at 1997 Fed Cup
(Croatia) Iva Majoli	0–1	0%	0–1	–	–	–	Lost (5–7, 4–6) at 1998 Australian Open
(Italy) Francesca Schiavone	0–2	0%	0–1	0–1	–	–	Lost (1–6, 2–6) at 2012 Strasbourg
Number 5 ranked players							
(Slovakia) Daniela Hantuchová	1–0	100%	–	1–0	–	–	Won (6–1, 6–2) at 2016 French Open
**(Italy) Sara Errani**	1–2	33%	1–1	0–1	–	–	Won (6–3, 6–4) at 2015 Luxembourg
(Czech Republic) Lucie Šafářová	1–4	20%	0–2	1–2	–	–	Won (7–5, 4–6, 6–3) at 2017 Rome
(Russia) Anna Chakvetadze	0–1	0%	0–1	–	–	–	Lost (2–6, 5–7) at 2007 Indian Wells
**(Latvia) Jeļena Ostapenko**	0–2	0%	0–1	0–1	–	–	Lost (3–6, 7–5, 4–6) at 2017 Charleston
Number 6 ranked players							
(United States) Chanda Rubin	0–1	0%	–	–	–	0–1	Lost (1–6, 2–6) at 1996 Salzburg
(Spain) Carla Suárez Navarro	0–4	0%	0–3	–	0–1	–	Lost (6–4, 6–7^{(4–7)}, 2–6) at 2017 US Open
Number 7 ranked players							
(France) Marion Bartoli	1–0	100%	–	–	1–0	–	Won (6–4, 6–3) at 2012 Wimbledon
(Switzerland) Patty Schnyder	1–1	50%	1–1	–	–	–	Won (6–3, 6–7^{(5–7)}, 6–3) at 1999 Toronto
(Italy) Roberta Vinci	1–2	33%	0–1	–	1–1	–	Lost (3–6, 3–6) at 2015 Toronto
**(United States) Madison Keys**	0–4	0%	0–1	0–3	–	–	Lost (6–4, 6–7^{(3–7)}, 6–7^{(0–7)}) at 2015 Strasbourg
Number 8 ranked players							
(Russia) Ekaterina Makarova	1–1	50%	–	1–0	0–1	–	Lost (1–6, 6–3, 4–6) at 2011 Eastbourne
(Australia) Alicia Molik	1–1	50%	1–1	–	–	–	Won (7–6^{(7–5)}, 6–1) at 2010 US Open
(Russia) Anna Kournikova	0–2	0%	0–2	–	–	–	Lost (4–6, 2–6) at 1999 Stanford
Number 9 ranked players							
(Germany) Julia Görges	1–0	100%	–	–	–	1–0	Won (6–4, 5–7, 6–2) at 2014 Quebec City
(Netherlands) Brenda Schultz-McCarthy	1–0	100%	–	1–0	–	–	Won (6–1, 6–4) at 2007 Charleston Qualifying
(France) Sandrine Testud	1–0	100%	–	1–0	–	–	Won (7–5, ret.) at 1998 Rome
Number 10 ranked players							
**(France) Kristina Mladenovic**	3–1	75%	–	3–1	–	–	Lost (4–6, 2–6) at 2017 Stuttgart
(Slovakia) Karina Habšudová	0–1	0%	0–1	–	–	–	Lost (3–6, 6–7^{(3–7)}) at 2001 Miami
(Russia) Maria Kirilenko	0–1	0%	0–1	–	–	–	Lost (1–6, 4–6) at 2010 Stanford
**Total**	**39–87**	**31%**	**16–50 (24%)**	**16–22 (42%)**	**5–13 (28%)**	**2–2 (50%)**	**Last updated 7 December 2023**

Notes

- active players are in **boldface**.

=== Wins over top 10 players ===
#	Player	Rank	Event	Surface	Round	Score	Ranking
**1997**
1.	(South Africa) Amanda Coetzer	No. 10	Bol Open, Croatia	Clay	SF	6–4, 6–3	NR
**1998**
2.	(France) Mary Pierce	No. 6	Italian Open	Clay	3R	7–5, 6–4	47
**1999**
3.	(United States) Monica Seles	No. 4	Wimbledon, UK	Grass	3R	7–6^{(7–4)}, 7–6^{(7–4)}	134
4.	(France) Nathalie Tauziat	No. 8	Wimbledon, UK	Grass	QF	4–6, 6–4, 7–5	134
**2012**
5.	(France) Marion Bartoli	No. 9	Wimbledon, UK	Grass	2R	6–4, 6–3	129
**2014**
6.	(Romania) Simona Halep	No. 2	US Open	Hard	3R	7–6^{(8–6)}, 6–2	121
**2015**
7.	(Romania) Simona Halep	No. 3	French Open	Clay	2R	7–5, 6–1	70
8.	(Czech Republic) Karolína Plíšková	No. 8	Rogers Cup, Toronto	Hard	1R	3–6, 7–6 ^{(7–5)}, 6–2	51
**2017**
9.	(Poland) Agnieszka Radwańska	No. 3	Australian Open	Hard	2R	6–3, 6–2	79
10.	(Czech Republic) Karolína Plíšková	No. 5	Australian Open	Hard	QF	6–4, 3–6, 6–4	79
11.	(Poland) Agnieszka Radwańska	No. 8	Miami Open, U.S.	Hard	3R	6–0, 6–3	29

Awards
Preceded by (Russia) Alisa Kleybanova	WTA Comeback Player of the Year; 2014	Succeeded by (United States) Venus Williams
