= Charlotte Petrick =

Canadian tennis player

- Country (sports): Canada
- Residence: Niagara-on-the-Lake, Ontario
- Born: January 31, 1997 (age 29) Niagara-on-the-Lake, Ontario
- Height: 1.78 m (5 ft 10 in)
- Turned pro: 2016
- Plays: Right-handed (two-handed backhand)
- Prize money: US$ 10,796

Singles
- Career record: 22–45
- Career titles: 0
- Highest ranking: No. 988 (May 4, 2015)

Doubles
- Career record: 12–23
- Career titles: 1 ITF
- Highest ranking: No. 378 (February 16, 2015)

Charlotte Petrick (born January 31, 1997) is a Canadian former professional tennis player. In May 2015, she reached her best singles ranking of world No. 988. On 16 February 2015, she peaked at No. 378 in the doubles rankings.

== Early life ==
She grew up in Oakville, Ontario with her younger brother Nicolas William Boris Bjorn Petrick; their parents met playing tennis.

== Tennis career ==
Petrick started playing with her parents at the age of two. As a young child she had tennis coaches in Oakville and Burlington; she also attended Nick Bollettieri Tennis Academy in Florida for up to 9 months a year, living in Bradenton, Florida with her mother.

In July 2011, Petrick played her first professional tournament at the $50k WOW Tennis Challenger but lost in the qualifying first round to Nicola Slater. In July 2012, she reached the semifinals in doubles of the $25kk Challenger de Granby with compatriot Françoise Abanda.

In August 2012 at the age of 15 she won the Under-18 Canadian National Championship, beating Gloria Liang in straight sets (6-3, 6-4).

In August 2014, Petrick won her first professional doubles title at the $25k Winnipeg Challenger where she played with Rosie Johanson. They defeated Maria Fernanda Alves and Anamika Bhargava in the final.

Petrick made her WTA Tour debut in September 2014 at the Coupe Banque Nationale, having received a wildcard with Sonja Molnar into the doubles tournament where they lost to Barbora Krejčíková and Tatjana Maria in the quarterfinals. Petrick was once again awarded a wildcard into the doubles main draw at the 2015 Coupe Banque Nationale in September, this time with Malika Auger-Aliassime, but was defeated in the opening round by Barbora Krejčíková and An-Sophie Mestach.

She played her last match on the ITF Circuit in July 2017, retiring in early 2018 after a long struggle with a wrist injury.

== ITF Circuit finals ==
=== Doubles: 1 (1 title) ===
Legend
$100,000 tournaments
$75,000 tournaments
$50,000 tournaments
$25,000 tournaments
$10,000 tournaments

Result	W–L	Date	Tournament	Tier	Surface	Partner	Opponents	Score
Win	1–0	Aug 2014	Winnipeg Challenger, Canada	25,000	Hard	(Canada) Rosie Johanson	(Brazil) Maria Fernanda Alves (United States) Anamika Bhargava	6–3, 6–3
