= 2000 Croatian Bol Ladies Open – Singles =

Singles
- 2000 Croatian Bol Ladies Open

Final
- Champion: (Slovenia) Tina Pisnik
- Runner-up: (France) Amélie Mauresmo
- Score: 7–6^{(7–4)}, 7–6^{(7–2)}

Details
- Draw: 30 (2WC/5Q)
- Seeds: 8

Events
Singles	Doubles
← 1999 ·	Croatian Bol Ladies Open	· 2001 →

Corina Morariu was the defending champion, but lost in the quarterfinals to Amélie Mauresmo.

Tina Pisnik won the title by defeating Mauresmo 7–6^{(7–4)}, 7–6^{(7–2)} in the final.

== Seeds ==
The first two seeds received a bye to the second round.

1. (France) Julie Halard-Decugis (second round)
2. (France) Sandrine Testud (quarterfinals)
3. (France) Amélie Mauresmo (final)
4. (Croatia) Silvija Talaja (second round)
5. (United States) Corina Morariu (quarterfinals)
6. (Italy) Silvia Farina (first round)
7. (Argentina) Paola Suárez (quarterfinals)
8. (Zimbabwe) Cara Black (second round)

== Draw ==
=== Key ===
- Q = Qualifier
- WC = Wild card
- LL = Lucky loser
- Alt = Alternate
- ITF = ITF entry
- PR = Protected ranking
- SR = Special ranking
- SE = Special exempt
- JE = Junior exempt
- JR = Junior Accelerator Programme entrant
- CO = College Accelerator Programme entrant
- NG = Next Gen Accelerator Program entrant
- w/o = Walkover
- r = Retired
- d = Defaulted

=== Finals ===
Semifinals
Q	(Spain) Gala León García	4	5
3	(France) Amélie Mauresmo	6	7
(Slovenia) Tina Pisnik	7^{7}	6
(Spain) María Sánchez Lorenzo	6^{3}	4

Final
3	(France) Amélie Mauresmo	6^{4}	6^{2}
(Slovenia) Tina Pisnik	7^{7}	7^{7}

=== Top half ===
First round
Q	(Spain) A Goñi	3	3
Q	(Spain) G León García	6	6
Q	(Belarus) N Ostrovskaya	6	6
(Netherlands) K Boogert	4	4
Q	(Spain) N Llagostera Vives	2	2
7	(Argentina) P Suárez	6	6
3	(France) A Mauresmo	7	6^{2}	6
(Hungary) R Kuti-Kis	5	7^{7}	2
(Czech Republic) A Gerši	0	3
(Slovenia) K Srebotnik	6	6
(Switzerland) E Gagliardi	6	2	6
Q	(Slovenia) T Križan	2	6	3
(Hungary) P Mandula	3	4
5	(United States) C Morariu	6	6

Second round
1	(France) J Halard-Decugis	3	1
Q	(Spain) G León García	6	6
Q	(Belarus) N Ostrovskaya	2	3
7	(Argentina) P Suárez	6	6
3	(France) A Mauresmo	6	6
(Slovenia) K Srebotnik	3	2
(Switzerland) E Gagliardi	6^{6}	2
5	(United States) C Morariu	7^{8}	6

Quarterfinals
Q	(Spain) G León García	6^{4}	7	7^{7}
7	(Argentina) P Suárez	7^{7}	5	6^{5}
3	(France) A Mauresmo	4	7	6
5	(United States) C Morariu	6	5	3

Semifinals
Q	(Spain) G León García	4	5
3	(France) A Mauresmo	6	7

=== Bottom half ===
First round
8	(Zimbabwe) C Black	6	6
(Netherlands) M Oremans	3	2
(Czech Republic) S Kleinová	3	3
(Spain) Á Montolio	6	6
(Slovenia) T Pisnik	6	6
(Austria) P Wartusch	1	0
(Spain) C Torrens Valero	3	0
4	(Croatia) S Talaja	6	6
6	(Italy) S Farina	2	4
(Spain) M Sánchez Lorenzo	6	6
WC	(France) V Razzano	6	6
WC	(Croatia) I Abramović	2	1
(Bulgaria) M Maleeva	3	0
(Croatia) J Kostanić	6	6

Second round
8	(Zimbabwe) C Black	5	3
(Spain) Á Montolio	7	6
(Slovenia) T Pisnik	6	6
4	(Croatia) S Talaja	4	4
(Spain) M Sánchez Lorenzo	7^{9}	5	6
WC	(France) V Razzano	6^{7}	7	1
(Croatia) J Kostanić	5	2
2	(France) S Testud	7	6

Quarterfinals
(Spain) Á Montolio	3	2
(Slovenia) T Pisnik	6	6
(Spain) M Sánchez Lorenzo	6	6
2	(France) S Testud	2	2

Semifinals
(Slovenia) T Pisnik	7^{7}	6
(Spain) M Sánchez Lorenzo	6^{3}	4
