= 2002 Pacific Life Open – Women's doubles =

Women's doubles
- 2002 Pacific Life Open

Final
- Champions: (United States) Lisa Raymond (Australia) Rennae Stubbs
- Runners-up: (Russia) Elena Dementieva (Slovakia) Janette Husárová
- Score: 7–5, 6–0

Details
- Draw: 32 (2WC/1Q/2LL)
- Seeds: 8

Events
Singles	men	women
Doubles	men	women
← 2001 ·	Indian Wells Masters	· 2003 →

Nicole Arendt and Ai Sugiyama were the defending champions but they competed with different partners that year, Arendt with Liezel Huber and Sugiyama with Elena Tatarkova.

Sugiyama and Tatarkova lost in the second round to Elena Dementieva and Janette Husárová.

Arendt and Huber lost in the quarterfinals to Virginia Ruano Pascual and Paola Suárez.

Lisa Raymond and Rennae Stubbs won in the final 7–5, 6–0 against Dementieva and Husárová.

== Seeds ==
Champion seeds are indicated in bold text while text in italics indicates the round in which those seeds were eliminated.

1. (United States) **Lisa Raymond** / (Australia) **Rennae Stubbs (champions)**
2. (Zimbabwe) Cara Black / (Russia) Elena Likhovtseva (second round)
3. (Spain) Virginia Ruano Pascual / (Argentina) Paola Suárez (semifinals)
4. (Switzerland) ~~Martina Hingis~~ / (Russia) ~~Anna Kournikova~~ (withdrew due to an injury on Kournikova)
5. (Slovakia) Daniela Hantuchová / (Spain) Arantxa Sánchez Vicario (semifinals)
6. (United States) Nicole Arendt / (South Africa) Liezel Huber (quarterfinals)
7. (Japan) Ai Sugiyama / (Ukraine) Elena Tatarkova (second round)
8. (Slovenia) Tina Križan / (Slovenia) Katarina Srebotnik (second round)
9. (United States) Kimberly Po-Messerli / (Australia) Nicole Pratt (quarterfinals)

== Draw ==
=== Key ===
- Q = Qualifier
- WC = Wild card
- LL = Lucky loser
- Alt = Alternate
- SE = Special exempt
- PR = Protected ranking
- ITF = ITF entry
- JE = Junior exempt
- w/o = Walkover
- r = Retired
- d = Defaulted
- SR = Special ranking

=== Final ===
Final
1	(United States) **Lisa Raymond** (Australia) **Rennae Stubbs**	**7**	**6**
	(Russia) Elena Dementieva (Slovakia) Janette Husárová	5	0

=== Top half ===
First round
1	(United States) **L Raymond** (Australia) **R Stubbs**	**6**	**6**
(Kazakhstan) I Selyutina (Argentina) P Tarabini	3	2
(Italy) S Farina Elia (Austria) B Schett	3	**6**	1
LL	(Switzerland) **E Gagliardi** (Italy) **A Serra Zanetti**	**6**	4	**6**
(Netherlands) **K Boogert** (Netherlands) **M Oremans**	**6**	**7**
(Hungary) P Mandula (Austria) P Wartusch	3	5
(France) N Dechy (United States) M Tu	2	5
8	(Slovenia) **T Križan** (Slovenia) **K Srebotnik**	**6**	**7**
9	(United States) **K Po-Messerli** (Australia) **N Pratt**	6^{7}	**6**	**6**
(Belgium) J Henin (United States) M Shaughnessy	**7^{9}**	1	3
(South Africa) A Coetzer (United States) L McNeil	5	4
(South Africa) **S de Beer** (South Africa) **N de Villiers**	**7**	**6**
WC	(Argentina) **G Dulko** (Russia) **M Sharapova**	**6**	3	**6**
(Bulgaria) M Maleeva (Sweden) Å Svensson	3	**6**	4
LL	(Bulgaria) L Bacheva (Belarus) T Poutchek	4	**6**	0
5	(Slovakia) **D Hantuchová** (Spain) **A Sánchez Vicario**	**6**	3	**6**

Second round
1	(United States) **L Raymond** (Australia) **R Stubbs**	**6**	**6**
LL	(Switzerland) E Gagliardi (Italy) A Serra Zanetti	3	1
(Netherlands) **K Boogert** (Netherlands) **M Oremans**	**6**	**6**
8	(Slovenia) T Križan (Slovenia) K Srebotnik	4	1
9	(United States) **K Po-Messerli** (Australia) **N Pratt**	**6**	**6**
(South Africa) S de Beer (South Africa) N de Villiers	0	3
WC	(Argentina) G Dulko (Russia) M Sharapova	5	3
5	(Slovakia) **D Hantuchová** (Spain) **A Sánchez Vicario**	**7**	**6**

Quarterfinals
1	(United States) **L Raymond** (Australia) **R Stubbs**	**6**	**6**
(Netherlands) K Boogert (Netherlands) M Oremans	3	3
9	(United States) K Po-Messerli (Australia) N Pratt	0	1
5	(Slovakia) **D Hantuchová** (Spain) **A Sánchez Vicario**	**6**	**6**

Semifinals
1	(United States) **L Raymond** (Australia) **R Stubbs**	**6**	**6**
5	(Slovakia) D Hantuchová (Spain) A Sánchez Vicario	1	4

=== Bottom half ===
First round
6	(United States) **N Arendt** (South Africa) **L Huber**	**6**	**6**
(Australia) R McQuillan (France) A-G Sidot	1	2
(United States) M Navratilova (Belarus) N Zvereva	4	5
WC	(United States) **M Middleton** (United States) **B Rippner**	**6**	**7**
(Argentina) L Montalvo (Argentina) M E Salerni	5	**6**	3
(Belgium) **E Callens** (Uzbekistan) **I Tulyaganova**	**7**	3	**6**
(Spain) C Martínez (Spain) M Serna	3	3
3	(Spain) **V Ruano Pascual** (Argentina) **P Suárez**	**6**	**6**
7	(Japan) **A Sugiyama** (Ukraine) **E Tatarkova**	**6**	**6**
(Italy) R Grande (Spain) M J Martínez	3	3
(Russia) **E Dementieva** (Slovakia) **J Husárová**	**6**	**6**
(Italy) T Garbin (Czech Republic) K Hrdličková	3	4
(Czech Republic) **D Bedáňová** (Russia) **E Bovina**	**7**	**6**
Q	(Japan) R Hiraki (Japan) N Miyagi	5	1
(France) A Fusai (Netherlands) C Vis	4	3
2	(Zimbabwe) **C Black** (Russia) **E Likhovtseva**	**6**	**6**

Second round
6	(United States) **N Arendt** (South Africa) **L Huber**	**6**	4	**6**
WC	(United States) M Middleton (United States) B Rippner	3	**6**	1
(Belgium) E Callens (Uzbekistan) I Tulyaganova	1	5
3	(Spain) **V Ruano Pascual** (Argentina) **P Suárez**	**6**	**7**
7	(Japan) A Sugiyama (Ukraine) E Tatarkova	4	1
(Russia) **E Dementieva** (Slovakia) **J Husárová**	**6**	**6**
(Czech Republic) **D Bedáňová** (Russia) **E Bovina**	**7**	4	**6**
2	(Zimbabwe) C Black (Russia) E Likhovtseva	5	**6**	3

Quarterfinals
6	(United States) N Arendt (South Africa) L Huber	1	**7^{7}**	4
3	(Spain) **V Ruano Pascual** (Argentina) **P Suárez**	**6**	6^{4}	**6**
(Russia) **E Dementieva** (Slovakia) **J Husárová**	**7^{7}**	**6**
(Czech Republic) D Bedáňová (Russia) E Bovina	6^{3}	0

Semifinals
3	(Spain) V Ruano Pascual (Argentina) P Suárez	3	2
(Russia) **E Dementieva** (Slovakia) **J Husárová**	**6**	**6**

== Qualifying ==
=== Qualifying seeds ===
1. (Bulgaria) Lubomira Bacheva / (Belarus) Tatiana Poutchek (qualifying competition, lucky losers)
2. **(Japan) Rika Hiraki / (Japan) Nana Miyagi (qualified)**

=== Qualifiers ===
1. **(Japan) Rika Hiraki / (Japan) Nana Miyagi**

=== Lucky losers ===
1. **(Bulgaria) Lubomira Bacheva / (Belarus) Tatiana Poutchek**
2. **(Switzerland) Emmanuelle Gagliardi / (Italy) Adriana Serra Zanetti**

=== Qualifying draw ===
First round
1	**(Bulgaria) L Bacheva** **(Belarus) T Poutchek**	**8**
(South Africa) K Grant (United States) S Reeves	4
WC	**(United States) M Irvin** **(United States) A Stevenson**	**9^{7}**
(United States) E deLone (United States) K Schlukebir	8^{4}
(Slovenia) M Matevžič (Slovenia) T Pisnik	4
**(Switzerland) E Gagliardi** **(Italy) Ad Serra Zanetti**	**8**
(Australia) E Dominikovic (Canada) V Webb	4
2	**(Japan) R Hiraki** **(Japan) N Miyagi**	**8**

Second round
1	**(Bulgaria) L Bacheva** **(Belarus) T Poutchek**	**8**
WC	(United States) M Irvin (United States) A Stevenson	6
(Switzerland) E Gagliardi (Italy) Ad Serra Zanetti	1
2	**(Japan) R Hiraki** **(Japan) N Miyagi**	**8**

Qualifying competition
1	(Bulgaria) L Bacheva (Belarus) T Poutchek	4	4
2	**(Japan) R Hiraki** **(Japan) N Miyagi**	**6**	**6**
