= 2001 Croatian Bol Ladies Open – Doubles =

Doubles
- 2001 Croatian Bol Ladies Open

Final
- Champions: (Spain) María José Martínez (Spain) Anabel Medina Garrigues
- Runners-up: (Russia) Nadia Petrova (Slovenia) Tina Pisnik
- Score: 7–5, 6–4

Details
- Draw: 16
- Seeds: 4

Events
Singles	Doubles
← 2000 ·	Croatian Bol Ladies Open	· 2002 →

Julie Halard-Decugis and Corina Morariu were the defending champions but only Morariu competed that year with Ai Sugiyama.

Morariu and Sugiyama lost in the quarterfinals to Galina Fokina and Stéphanie Foretz.

María José Martínez and Anabel Medina Garrigues won in the final 7–5, 6–4 against Nadia Petrova and Tina Pisnik.

== Seeds ==
Champion seeds are indicated in bold text while text in italics indicates the round in which those seeds were eliminated.

1. (United States) Corina Morariu / (Japan) Ai Sugiyama (quarterfinals)
2. (Slovenia) Tina Križan / (Slovenia) Katarina Srebotnik (semifinals)
3. (Spain) **María José Martínez** / (Spain) **Anabel Medina Garrigues (champions)**
4. (France) Nathalie Dechy / (France) Virginie Razzano (quarterfinals)

== Draw ==
Key

- Q = Qualifier
- WC = Wild card
- LL = Lucky loser
- Alt = Alternate
- ITF = ITF entry
- PR = Protected ranking
- SR = Special ranking
- SE = Special exempt
- JE = Junior exempt
- JR = Junior Accelerator Programme entrant
- CO = College Accelerator Programme entrant
- NG = Next Gen Accelerator Program entrant
- w/o = Walkover
- r = Retired
- d = Defaulted

First round
1	(United States) **C Morariu** (Japan) **A Sugiyama**	**6**	**6**
(United States) M Tu (Germany) M Weingärtner	1	2
WC	(Croatia) D Hadžić (Croatia) D Jurak	1	2
(Russia) **G Fokina** (France) **S Foretz**	**6**	**6**
4	(France) **N Dechy** (France) **V Razzano**	**6**	**6**
LL	(Croatia) D Čaljkušić (Croatia) A Margetić	0	2
Q	(Russia) **N Petrova** (Slovenia) **T Pisnik**	**6**	**6**
(Spain) M Marrero (Germany) J Schruff	1	0
(Germany) **M Buric** (Hungary) **E Molnár**	**6**	**7^{7}**
LL	(Croatia) P Dizdar (Croatia) M Marović	1	6^{5}
(Argentina) M Díaz Oliva (New Zealand) P Nola	4	2
3	(Spain) **M J Martínez** (Spain) **A Medina Garrigues**	**6**	**6**
(Hungary) **Z Gubacsi** (Belarus) **N Ostrovskaya**	**6**	6^{9}	**6**
(Belarus) T Poutchek (Germany) C Schneider	2	**7^{11}**	3
(United States) D Buth (Czech Republic) M Paštiková	1	4
2	(Slovenia) **T Križan** (Slovenia) **K Srebotnik**	**6**	**6**

Quarterfinals
1	(United States) C Morariu (Japan) A Sugiyama	5	3
(Russia) **G Fokina** (France) **S Foretz**	**7**	**6**
4	(France) N Dechy (France) V Razzano	**7^{7}**	1	0
Q	(Russia) **N Petrova** (Slovenia) **T Pisnik**	6^{3}	**6**	**6**
(Germany) M Buric (Hungary) E Molnár	3	**6**	1
3	(Spain) **M J Martínez** (Spain) **A Medina Garrigues**	**6**	3	**6**
(Hungary) Z Gubacsi (Belarus) N Ostrovskaya	2	4
2	(Slovenia) **T Križan** (Slovenia) **K Srebotnik**	**6**	**6**

Semifinals
(Russia) G Fokina (France) S Foretz	2	3
Q	(Russia) **N Petrova** (Slovenia) **T Pisnik**	**6**	**6**
3	(Spain) **M J Martínez** (Spain) **A Medina Garrigues**	**7**	4	**6**
2	(Slovenia) T Križan (Slovenia) K Srebotnik	5	**6**	4

Final
Q	(Russia) Nadia Petrova (Slovenia) Tina Pisnik	5	4
3	(Spain) **María José Martínez** (Spain) **Anabel Medina Garrigues**	**7**	**6**
