= 2001 Indian Wells Open – Women's singles =

Women's singles
- 2001 Indian Wells Open

Final
- Champion: (United States) Serena Williams
- Runner-up: (Belgium) Kim Clijsters
- Score: 4–6, 6–4, 6–2

Details
- Draw: 96
- Seeds: 32

Events
| Singles | men | women |
| Doubles | men | women |
| ← 2000 · | Indian Wells Open | · 2002 → |

Serena Williams defeated Kim Clijsters in the final, 4–6, 6–4, 6–2 to win the women's singles tennis title at the 2001 Indian Wells Open. This would be the final time Williams would attend the Indian Wells Open until 2015, due to a boycott of the tournament by both Williams sisters in protest of alleged racist remarks by crowd members. Venus Williams would not return to the tournament until 2016.

Lindsay Davenport was the defending champion, but lost in the quarterfinals to Serena Williams.

== Seeds ==
A champion seed is indicated in bold text while text in italics indicates the round in which that seed was eliminated. All thirty-two seeds received a bye to the second round.

1. (Switzerland) Martina Hingis (semifinals)
2. (United States) Lindsay Davenport (quarterfinals)
3. (United States) Venus Williams (semifinals, withdrew)
4. (United States) Monica Seles (second round)
5. (Spain) Conchita Martínez (second round)
6. (France) Mary Pierce (withdrew)
7. (United States) **Serena Williams (champion)**
8. (Russia) Elena Dementieva (quarterfinals)
9. (France) Nathalie Tauziat (second round)
10. (Spain) Arantxa Sánchez-Vicario (third round)
11. (Germany) Anke Huber (fourth round)
12. (Bulgaria) Magdalena Maleeva (fourth round)
13. (France) Sandrine Testud (third round)
14. (Belgium) Kim Clijsters (final)
15. (United States) Amy Frazier (second round)
16. (Austria) Barbara Schett (fourth round)
17. (Belgium) Justine Henin (third round)
18. (Argentina) Paola Suárez (third round)
19. (Thailand) Tamarine Tanasugarn (third round)
20. (United States) Lisa Raymond (fourth round)
21. (United States) Meghann Shaughnessy (third round)
22. (Russia) Elena Likhovtseva (second round)
23. (France) Nathalie Dechy (fourth round)
24. (Spain) Magüi Serna (third round)
25. (Luxembourg) Anne Kremer (third round)
26. (Spain) Gala León García (third round)
27. (Switzerland) Patty Schnyder (second round)
28. (France) Anne-Gaëlle Sidot (third round)
29. (Russia) Tatiana Panova (second round)
30. (Japan) Ai Sugiyama (fourth round)
31. (Italy) Silvia Farina Elia (quarterfinals)
32. (Zimbabwe) Cara Black (third round)
33. (Croatia) Silvija Talaja (second round)

== Draw ==
=== Key ===
- Q = Qualifier
- WC = Wild card
- LL = Lucky loser
- Alt = Alternate
- SE = Special exempt
- PR = Protected ranking
- ITF = ITF entry
- JE = Junior exempt
- w/o = Walkover
- r = Retired
- d = Defaulted
- SR = Special ranking

=== Finals ===
Quarterfinals
1 | (Switzerland) Martina Hingis | 6 | 6
31 | (Italy) Silvia Farina Elia | 0 | 1
14 | (Belgium) Kim Clijsters | 6 | 6
(Russia) Elena Bovina | 2 | 2
8 | (Russia) Elena Dementieva | 0 | 3
3 | (United States) Venus Williams | 6 | 6
7 | (United States) Serena Williams | 6 | 6
2 | (United States) Lindsay Davenport | 1 | 2

Semifinals
1 | (Switzerland) Martina Hingis | 2 | 6 | 1
14 | (Belgium) Kim Clijsters | 6 | 2 | 6
3 | (United States) Venus Williams
7 | (United States) Serena Williams | w/o

Final
14 | (Belgium) Kim Clijsters | 6 | 4 | 2
7 | (United States) Serena Williams | 4 | 6 | 6

=== Top half ===
==== Section 1 ====
First round
(Japan) S Asagoe | 3 | 6 | 2
(Czech Republic) K Hrdličková | 6 | 3 | 6
Q | (Spain) C Torrens Valero | 6 | 7
(Switzerland) E Gagliardi | 3 | 5
(Czech Republic) D Bedáňová | 6^{3} | 6 | 6^{6}
(Germany) J Kandarr | 7^{7} | 3 | 7^{8}
Q | (Czech Republic) S Kleinová | 6 | 6
(Spain) M Marrero | 4 | 3

Second round
1 | (Switzerland) M Hingis | 7 | 6
(Czech Republic) K Hrdličková | 5 | 0
Q | (Spain) C Torrens Valero | 7 | 7
29 | (Russia) T Panova | 5 | 5
18 | (Argentina) P Suárez | 6 | 4 | 6
(Germany) J Kandarr | 4 | 6 | 4
(Czech Republic) S Kleinová | 2 | 1
16 | (Austria) B Schett | 6 | 6

Third round
1 | (Switzerland) M Hingis | 6 | 6
Q | (Spain) C Torrens Valero | 3 | 0
18 | (Argentina) P Suárez | 3 | 3
16 | (Austria) B Schett | 6 | 6

Fourth round
1 | (Switzerland) M Hingis | 6 | 7^{7}
16 | (Austria) B Schett | 3 | 6^{4}

==== Section 2 ====
First round
WC | (United States) S Cacic | 6 | 6
WC | (Slovenia) K Srebotnik | 4 | 3
Q | (United States) T Snyder | 6 | 3 | 3
(Switzerland) M Vavrinec | 3 | 6 | 6
(United States) B Rippner | 1 | 7 | 6^{6}
WC | (Federal Republic of Yugoslavia) J Janković | 6 | 5 | 7^{8}
(United States) M Tu | 2 | 3
Q | (Australia) E Dominikovic | 6 | 6

Second round
11 | (Germany) A Huber | 7 | 7
WC | (United States) S Cacic | 5 | 5
(Switzerland) M Vavrinec | 2 | 5
19 | (Thailand) T Tanasugarn | 6 | 7
31 | (Italy) S Farina Elia | 6 | 6
WC | (Federal Republic of Yugoslavia) J Janković | 2 | 4
Q | (Australia) E Dominikovic | 6 | 4 | 7
9 | (France) N Tauziat | 4 | 6 | 5

Third round
11 | (Germany) A Huber | 3 | 6 | 6
19 | (Thailand) T Tanasugarn | 6 | 4 | 3
31 | (Italy) S Farina Elia | 6 | 6
Q | (Australia) E Dominikovic | 1 | 3

Fourth round
11 | (Germany) A Huber | 3 | 6 | 4
31 | (Italy) S Farina Elia | 6 | 3 | 6

==== Section 3 ====
First round
(Belarus) O Barabanschikova | 6^{2} | 3
(Italy) T Garbin | 7^{7} | 6
Q | (Slovakia) J Husárová | 5 | 6 | 6
(Canada) J Nejedly | 7 | 3 | 3
(Germany) B Rittner | 6 | 6
(South Africa) M de Swardt | 1 | 2
(Czech Republic) D Chládková | 6^{4} | 2
(Austria) S Plischke | 7^{7} | 6

Second round
4 | (United States) M Seles | 6^{6} | 6 | 4
(Italy) T Garbin | 7^{8} | 3 | 6
Q | (Slovakia) J Husárová | 5 | 0
30 | (Japan) A Sugiyama | 7 | 6
17 | (Belgium) J Henin | 6 | 6
(Germany) B Rittner | 3 | 4
(Austria) S Plischke | 2 | 3
14 | (Belgium) K Clijsters | 6 | 6

Third round
(Italy) T Garbin | 4 | 2
30 | (Japan) A Sugiyama | 6 | 6
17 | (Belgium) J Henin | 6 | 4 | 3
14 | (Belgium) K Clijsters | 1 | 6 | 6

Fourth round
30 | (Japan) A Sugiyama | 4 | 6 | 2
14 | (Belgium) K Clijsters | 6 | 4 | 6

==== Section 4 ====
First round
(United States) J Hopkins | 6 | 6
(Poland) M Grzybowska | 1 | 2
(Romania) R Dragomir | 1 | 6 | 5
(United States) L Osterloh | 6 | 3 | 7
(Italy) F Schiavone | 6 | 6
Q | (Germany) A Glass | 4 | 1
(Uzbekistan) I Tulyaganova | 4 | 3
(Russia) E Bovina | 6 | 6

Second round
10 | (Spain) A Sánchez-Vicario | 6 | 6^{5} | 6
(United States) J Hopkins | 0 | 7^{7} | 4
(United States) L Osterloh | 1 | 1
23 | (France) N Dechy | 6 | 6
27 | (Switzerland) P Schnyder | 4 | 5
(Italy) F Schiavone | 6 | 7
(Russia) E Bovina | 6 | 6
5 | (Spain) C Martínez | 4 | 4

Third round
10 | (Spain) A Sánchez-Vicario | 6^{9} | 6 | 2
23 | (France) N Dechy | 7^{11} | 3 | 6
(Italy) F Schiavone | 3 | 7 | 3
(Russia) E Bovina | 6 | 5 | 6

Fourth round
23 | (France) N Dechy | 3 | 6 | 5
(Russia) E Bovina | 6 | 2 | 7

=== Bottom half ===
==== Section 5 ====
First round
(United States) K Brandi | 6 | 6
(Italy) G Casoni | 2 | 1
(Sweden) Å Carlsson | 2 | 2
(Slovenia) T Pisnik | 6 | 6
Q | (Russia) L Krasnoroutskaya | 7 | 6
Q | (United States) D Buth | 5 | 3
(Russia) N Petrova | 6 | 6
(Bulgaria) P Nola | 4 | 3

Second round
8 | (Russia) E Dementieva | 6 | 6
(United States) K Brandi | 2 | 0
(Slovenia) T Pisnik | 5 | 1
25 | (Luxembourg) A Kremer | 7 | 6
22 | (Russia) E Likhovtseva | 6 | 3 | 2
Q | (Russia) L Krasnoroutskaya | 3 | 6 | 6
(Russia) N Petrova | 6 | 6
33 | (Croatia) S Talaja | 3 | 3

Third round
8 | (Russia) E Dementieva | 6 | 6
25 | (Luxembourg) A Kremer | 1 | 4
Q | (Russia) L Krasnoroutskaya | 6 | 6
(Russia) N Petrova | 3 | 3

Fourth round
8 | (Russia) E Dementieva | 6
Q | (Russia) L Krasnoroutskaya | 3 | r

==== Section 6 ====
First round
LL | (Australia) R McQuillan | 4 | 6 | 6
(Canada) S Jeyaseelan | 6 | 1 | 3
(Israel) A Smashnova | 3 | 7^{7} | 3
LL | (France) É Loit | 6 | 6^{4} | 6
(Italy) R Grande | 6 | 6
(China) F Li | 2 | 2
WC | (United States) A Stevenson | 6 | 4 | 4
(France) S Pitkowski | 4 | 6 | 6

Second round
15 | (United States) A Frazier | 5 | 5
LL | (Australia) R McQuillan | 7 | 7
LL | (France) É Loit | 2 | 1
21 | (United States) M Shaughnessy | 6 | 6
32 | (Zimbabwe) C Black | 6 | 4 | 6
(Italy) R Grande | 2 | 6 | 1
(France) S Pitkowski | 0 | 1
3 | (United States) V Williams | 6 | 6

Third round
LL | (Australia) R McQuillan | 6 | 6
21 | (United States) M Shaughnessy | 3 | 4
32 | (Zimbabwe) C Black | 4 | 6 | 0
3 | (United States) V Williams | 6 | 3 | 6

Fourth round
LL | (Australia) R McQuillan | 4 | 2
3 | (United States) V Williams | 6 | 6

==== Section 7 ====
First round
(Czech Republic) A Gerši | 6 | 6
(Russia) A Jidkova | 3 | 3
(Paraguay) R de los Ríos | 7^{7} | 7^{7}
Q | (Bulgaria) L Bacheva | 6^{3} | 6^{2}
(Hungary) R Kuti-Kis | 6 | 6
Q | (Slovakia) D Hantuchová | 1 | 4
(Netherlands) M Oremans | 6 | 2 | 3
Q | (Belarus) T Poutchek | 1 | 6 | 6

Second round
7 | (United States) S Williams | 6 | 6
(Czech Republic) A Gerši | 3 | 2
(Paraguay) R de los Ríos | 2 | 2
26 | (Spain) G León García | 6 | 6
24 | (Spain) M Serna | 6 | 6
(Hungary) R Kuti-Kis | 2 | 3
Q | (Belarus) T Poutchek | 6 | 6^{2} | 1
12 | (Bulgaria) M Maleeva | 4 | 7^{7} | 6

Third round
7 | (United States) S Williams | 6 | 6
26 | (Spain) G León García | 3 | 1
24 | (Spain) M Serna | 5 | 2
12 | (Bulgaria) M Maleeva | 7 | 6

Fourth round
7 | (United States) S Williams | 7 | 6
12 | (Bulgaria) M Maleeva | 5 | 2

==== Section 8 ====
First round
(Spain) Á Montolio | 7 | 3 | 6
(Spain) V Ruano Pascual | 5 | 6 | 3
(Germany) M Weingärtner | 4 | 2
(Croatia) I Majoli | 6 | 6
(Austria) P Wartusch | 2 | 6 | 3
(Belgium) L Courtois | 6 | 3 | 6
(United States) C Morariu | 3 | 1
(Australia) N Pratt | 6 | 6

Second round
13 | (France) S Testud | 6 | 6
(Spain) Á Montolio | 1 | 3
(Croatia) I Majoli | 2 | 5
20 | (United States) L Raymond | 6 | 7
28 | (France) A-G Sidot | 5 | 7^{7} | 6
(Belgium) L Courtois | 7 | 6^{3} | 0
(Australia) N Pratt | 2 | 1
2 | (United States) L Davenport | 6 | 6

Third round
13 | (France) S Testud | 7^{9} | 4 | 5
20 | (United States) L Raymond | 6^{7} | 6 | 7
32 | (France) A-G Sidot | 4 | 4
2 | (United States) L Davenport | 6 | 6

Fourth round
20 | (United States) L Raymond | 4 | 2
2 | (United States) L Davenport | 6 | 6
