= 2000 Croatian Bol Ladies Open – Doubles =

Doubles
- 2000 Croatian Bol Ladies Open

Final
- Champions: (France) Julie Halard-Decugis (United States) Corina Morariu
- Runners-up: (Slovenia) Tina Križan (Slovenia) Katarina Srebotnik
- Score: 6–2, 6–2

Details
- Draw: 16 (1WC/1Q)
- Seeds: 4

Events
Singles	Doubles
← 1999 ·	Croatian Bol Ladies Open	· 2001 →

Jelena Kostanić and Michaela Paštiková were the defending champions, but Paštiková did not compete this year. Kostanić teamed up with Tina Pisnik and lost in the semifinals to Tina Križan and Katarina Srebotnik.

Julie Halard-Decugis and Corina Morariu won the title by defeating Križan and Srebotnik 6–2, 6–2 in the final.

== Seeds ==
1. (France) Julie Halard-Decugis / (United States) Corina Morariu (champions)
2. (Slovenia) Tina Križan / (Slovenia) Katarina Srebotnik (final)
3. (Zimbabwe) Cara Black / (Kazakhstan) Irina Selyutina (first round)
4. (Netherlands) Kristie Boogert / (Netherlands) Miriam Oremans (semifinals)

== Draw ==
=== Key ===
- Q = Qualifier
- WC = Wild card
- LL = Lucky loser
- Alt = Alternate
- SE = Special exempt
- PR = Protected ranking
- ITF = ITF entry
- JE = Junior exempt
- w/o = Walkover
- r = Retired
- d = Defaulted
- SR = Special ranking

=== Draw ===
First round
1	(France) J Halard-Decugis (United States) C Morariu	6	6
(Denmark) E Dyrberg (Belarus) N Ostrovskaya	2	3
Q	(Spain) M Marrero (Austria) M Schnell	2	7^{7}	6^{6}
(Russia) E Kulikovskaya (Hungary) P Mandula	6	6^{3}	7^{8}
4	(Netherlands) K Boogert (Netherlands) M Oremans	6	6
(Czech Republic) E Martincová (Spain) C Torrens Valero	2	2
(Spain) G León García (Spain) M Sánchez Lorenzo	7	6
(Bulgaria) M Maleeva (Croatia) S Talaja	5	1
(Bulgaria) S Krivencheva (Slovenia) M Matevžič	6	6
WC	(Croatia) D Jurak (Croatia) Karin Zibar	2	1
(Croatia) J Kostanić (Slovenia) T Pisnik	6	6
3	(Zimbabwe) C Black (Kazakhstan) I Selyutina	1	3
(South Africa) K Grant (United States) R Jensen	0	2
(Spain) RM Andrés Rodríguez (Spain) C Martínez Granados	6	6
(United Kingdom) J Pullin (Spain) M Ramón Climent	2	3
2	(Slovenia) T Križan (Slovenia) K Srebotnik	6	6

Quarterfinals
1	(France) J Halard-Decugis (United States) C Morariu	w/o
(Russia) E Kulikovskaya (Hungary) P Mandula
4	(Netherlands) K Boogert (Netherlands) M Oremans	6	2	7
(Spain) G León García (Spain) M Sánchez Lorenzo	0	6	5
(Bulgaria) S Krivencheva (Slovenia) M Matevžič	5	2
(Croatia) J Kostanić (Slovenia) T Pisnik	7	6
(Spain) RM Andrés Rodríguez (Spain) C Martínez Granados	5	6	4
2	(Slovenia) T Križan (Slovenia) K Srebotnik	7	1	6

Semifinals
1	(France) J Halard-Decugis (United States) C Morariu	6	6
4	(Netherlands) K Boogert (Netherlands) M Oremans	2	1
(Croatia) J Kostanić (Slovenia) T Pisnik	1	6^{2}
2	(Slovenia) T Križan (Slovenia) K Srebotnik	6	7^{7}

Final
1	(France) J Halard-Decugis (United States) C Morariu	6	6
2	(Slovenia) T Križan (Slovenia) K Srebotnik	2	2
