= 2000 Croatian Bol Ladies Open =

- Date: 1–7 May
- Edition: 7th
- Category: Tier III
- Draw: 32S / 16D
- Prize money: $170,000
- Surface: Clay / outdoor
- Location: Bol, Croatia

Champions

Singles
- (Slovenia) Tina Pisnik

Doubles
- (France) Julie Halard-Decugis (United States) Corina Morariu
← 1999 ·	Croatian Bol Ladies Open	· 2001 →

The 2000 Croatian Bol Ladies Open was a women's tennis tournament played on outdoor clay courts in Bol, Croatia that was part of the Tier III category of the 2000 WTA Tour. It was the seventh edition of the tournament and was held from 1 May until 7 May 2000. Unseeded Tina Pisnik won the singles title and earned $27,000 first-prize money.

== Finals ==
=== Singles ===
(Slovenia) Tina Pisnik defeated (France) Amélie Mauresmo 7–6^{(7–4)}, 7–6^{(7–2)}

- It was Pisnik's only singles title of her career.

=== Doubles ===
(France) Julie Halard-Decugis / (United States) Corina Morariu defeated (Slovenia) Tina Križan / (Slovenia) Katarina Srebotnik 6–2, 6–2

== See also ==
- 2000 Croatia Open
