= 2002 Pacific Life Open – Men's singles =

Men's singles
- 2002 Pacific Life Open

Final
- Champion: (Australia) Lleyton Hewitt
- Runner-up: (United Kingdom) Tim Henman
- Score: 6–1, 6–2

Details
- Draw: 64 (4WC/8Q)
- Seeds: 16

Events
Singles	men	women
Doubles	men	women
← 2001 ·	Indian Wells Masters	· 2003 →

Lleyton Hewitt defeated Tim Henman in the final, 6–1, 6–2 to win the men's singles tennis title at the 2002 Indian Wells Masters. It was his first Masters Series title.

Andre Agassi was the defending champion, but lost in the first round to Michel Kratochvil.

== Seeds ==
1. (Australia) Lleyton Hewitt (champion)
2. (Russia) Yevgeny Kafelnikov (quarterfinals)
3. (Spain) Juan Carlos Ferrero (first round)
4. (United States) Andre Agassi (first round)
5. (Germany) Tommy Haas (second round)
6. (France) Sébastien Grosjean (first round)
7. (Russia) Marat Safin (third round)
8. (Sweden) Thomas Johansson (first round)
9. (United Kingdom) Tim Henman (final)
10. (United States) Pete Sampras (semifinals)
11. (United States) ~~Andy Roddick~~ (withdrew due to an upper respiratory infection)
12. (Switzerland) Roger Federer (third round)
13. (Czech Republic) Jiří Novák (second round)
14. (Croatia) ~~Goran Ivanišević~~ (withdrew due to a left shoulder injury)
15. (Argentina) Guillermo Cañas (first round)
16. (Spain) Àlex Corretja (second round)
17. (Ecuador) Nicolás Lapentti (first round)

== Draw ==
=== Key ===
- Q = Qualifier
- WC = Wild card
- LL = Lucky loser
- Alt = Alternate
- SE = Special exempt
- PR = Protected ranking
- ITF = ITF entry
- JE = Junior exempt
- w/o = Walkover
- r = Retired
- d = Defaulted
- SR = Special ranking

=== Finals ===
Quarterfinals
1	(Australia) Lleyton Hewitt	6	6
(Sweden) Thomas Enqvist	4	4
(Germany) Rainer Schüttler	2	4
10	(United States) Pete Sampras	6	6
9	(United Kingdom) Tim Henman	6	6
(Argentina) Gastón Gaudio	3	2
WC	(United States) Todd Martin	7^{7}	6
2	(Russia) Yevgeny Kafelnikov	6^{5}	3

Semifinals
1	(Australia) Lleyton Hewitt	6	6
10	(United States) Pete Sampras	2	4
9	(United Kingdom) Tim Henman	6	6
WC	(United States) Todd Martin	3	3

Final
1	(Australia) Lleyton Hewitt	6	6
9	(United Kingdom) Tim Henman	1	2

=== Top half ===
==== Section 1 ====
First round
1	(Australia) L Hewitt	6	6
(Spain) C Moyá	4	4
(Spain) G Blanco	6^{6}	4
(Romania) A Pavel	7^{8}	6
(United States) J-M Gambill	3	6	6
WC	(United States) J Blake	6	3	2
Q	(Belgium) O Rochus	7	5	2
13	(Czech Republic) J Novák	5	7	6
12	(Switzerland) R Federer	6^{5}	7^{7}	6
(Belgium) X Malisse	7^{7}	6^{3}	3
(Morocco) Y El Aynaoui	6^{7}	3
(Austria) S Koubek	7^{9}	6
(South Africa) W Ferreira	6^{5}	6^{1}
Q	(Hungary) A Sávolt	7^{7}	7^{7}
(Sweden) T Enqvist	7^{7}	2	6
8	(Sweden) T Johansson	6^{4}	6	4

Second round
1	(Australia) L Hewitt	4	6	6
(Romania) A Pavel	6	3	0
(United States) J-M Gambill	6	6
13	(Czech Republic) J Novák	3	2
12	(Switzerland) R Federer	6	6
(Austria) S Koubek	4	4
Q	(Hungary) A Sávolt	6	4	2
(Sweden) T Enqvist	2	6	6

Third round
1	(Australia) L Hewitt	6	6
(United States) J-M Gambill	2	4
12	(Switzerland) R Federer	4	3
(Sweden) T Enqvist	6	6

Quarterfinals
1	(Australia) L Hewitt	6	6
(Sweden) T Enqvist	4	4

==== Section 2 ====
First round
4	(United States) A Agassi	6^{5}	6^{6}
(Switzerland) M Kratochvil	7^{7}	7^{8}
(Croatia) I Ljubičić	6^{5}	5
(Chile) M Ríos	7^{7}	7
(France) A Clément	6^{5}	3
(Argentina) D Nalbandian	7^{7}	6
(Germany) R Schüttler	6	6
LL	(Argentina) M Zabaleta	2	1
10	(United States) P Sampras	7^{7}	6
Q	(United States) M Fish	6^{5}	2
(Spain) A Costa	6	3	6
(Czech Republic) B Ulihrach	1	6	3
(Germany) N Kiefer	7^{7}	6
WC	(United States) T Dent	6^{3}	3
(France) F Santoro	6	4	7
6	(France) S Grosjean	3	6	5

Second round
(Switzerland) M Kratochvil	4	2
(Chile) M Ríos	6	6
(Argentina) D Nalbandian	6	4	2
(Germany) R Schüttler	4	6	6
10	(United States) P Sampras	6	6
(Spain) A Costa	4	4
(Germany) N Kiefer	6^{1}	1
(France) F Santoro	7^{7}	6

Third round
(Chile) M Ríos	2	2
(Germany) R Schüttler	6	6
10	(United States) P Sampras	6	3	7
(France) F Santoro	3	6	5

Quarterfinals
(Germany) R Schüttler	2	4
10	(United States) P Sampras	6	6

=== Bottom half ===
==== Section 3 ====
First round
7	(Russia) M Safin	6	7^{7}
(Spain) A Martín	3	6^{4}
Q	(Thailand) P Srichaphan	6	2	6
WC	(United States) M Chang	4	6	3
(France) N Escudé	6	6
(Netherlands) S Schalken	3	0
(Spain) T Robredo	2	7^{9}	4
9	(United Kingdom) T Henman	6	6^{7}	6
15	(Argentina) G Cañas	4	2
(Argentina) G Gaudio	6	6
Q	(Chile) F González	7	6
(Spain) F Mantilla	5	2
(Slovakia) D Hrbatý	1	4
(France) J Boutter	6	6
(United Kingdom) G Rusedski	6	6
3	(Spain) J C Ferrero	4	3

Second round
7	(Russia) M Safin	7	6
Q	(Thailand) P Srichaphan	5	1
(France) N Escudé	2	6^{4}
9	(United Kingdom) T Henman	6	7^{7}
(Argentina) G Gaudio	6	7
Q	(Chile) F González	2	5
(France) J Boutter	6^{4}	6	6
(United Kingdom) G Rusedski	7^{7}	3	4

Third round
7	(Russia) M Safin	6^{3}	4
9	(United Kingdom) T Henman	7^{7}	6
(Argentina) G Gaudio	7^{8}	2	6
(France) J Boutter	6^{6}	6	1

Quarterfinals
9	(United Kingdom) T Henman	6	6
(Argentina) G Gaudio	3	2

==== Section 4 ====
First round
5	(Germany) T Haas	6	7
Q	(Spain) D Sánchez	3	5
WC	(United States) T Martin	6	7^{7}
Q	(Australia) W Arthurs	1	6^{4}
(Spain) A Portas	7	4	4
(Argentina) F Squillari	5	6	6
Q	(Slovakia) K Kučera	6	6
17	(Ecuador) N Lapentti	2	3
16	(Spain) À Corretja	6	6
(Italy) A Gaudenzi	2	4
(Argentina) J I Chela	4	6	7
(Belarus) M Mirnyi	6	2	5
(Spain) F Vicente	7	6
LL	(Spain) F Clavet	5	3
(Sweden) J Björkman	5	3
2	(Russia) Y Kafelnikov	7	6

Second round
5	(Germany) T Haas	4	2
WC	(United States) T Martin	6	6
(Argentina) F Squillari	4	2
Q	(Slovakia) K Kučera	6	6
16	(Spain) À Corretja	4	0
(Argentina) J I Chela	6	6
(Spain) F Vicente	3	6^{4}
2	(Russia) Y Kafelnikov	6	7^{7}

Third round
WC	(United States) T Martin	7	6
Q	(Slovakia) K Kučera	5	2
(Argentina) J I Chela	6^{8}	4
2	(Russia) Y Kafelnikov	7^{10}	6

Quarterfinals
WC	(United States) T Martin	7^{7}	6
2	(Russia) Y Kafelnikov	6^{5}	3
