= 2002 Pacific Life Open – Women's singles =

Women's singles
- 2002 Pacific Life Open

Final
- Champion: (Slovakia) Daniela Hantuchová
- Runner-up: (Switzerland) Martina Hingis
- Score: 6–3, 6–4

Details
- Draw: 96 (8WC/12Q/1LL)
- Seeds: 32

Events
Singles	men	women
Doubles	men	women
← 2001 ·	Indian Wells Masters	· 2003 →

Daniela Hantuchová defeated Martina Hingis in the final, 6–3, 6–4 to win the women's singles tennis title at the 2002 Indian Wells Masters. It was her first WTA Tour singles title.

Serena Williams was the reigning champion, but she boycotted the tournament in protest of racist remarks by members of the crowd the previous year. She did not return to Indian Wells until 2015.

This was the first WTA Tour tournament in which future world No. 1 and five-time major champion Maria Sharapova competed; she was defeated in the second round by Monica Seles.

== Seeds ==
All seeds received a bye into the second round.

1. (Belgium) Kim Clijsters (second round)
2. (Switzerland) Martina Hingis (final)
3. (Belgium) Justine Henin (fourth round)
4. (United States) Monica Seles (semifinals)
5. (Federal Republic of Yugoslavia) Jelena Dokić (third round)
6. (United States) Meghann Shaughnessy (fourth round)
7. (Italy) Silvia Farina Elia (fourth round)
8. (Russia) Elena Dementieva (third round)
9. (Spain) Arantxa Sánchez Vicario (quarterfinals)
10. (South Africa) Amanda Coetzer (quarterfinals)
11. (Bulgaria) Magdalena Maleeva (second round)
12. (United States) Lisa Raymond (quarterfinals)
13. (Uzbekistan) Iroda Tulyaganova (third round)
14. (Thailand) Tamarine Tanasugarn (third round)
15. (Spain) Ángeles Montolio (second round)
16. (Austria) Barbara Schett (third round)
17. (Italy) Francesca Schiavone (second round)
18. (Slovakia) Daniela Hantuchová (champion)
19. (Czech Republic) Dája Bedáňová (third round)
20. (Italy) Rita Grande (second round)
21. (Spain) Magüi Serna (second round)
22. (Japan) Ai Sugiyama (fourth round)
23. (Spain) Cristina Torrens Valero (second round)
24. (Russia) Tatiana Panova (third round)
25. (United States) Alexandra Stevenson (fourth round)
26. (Luxembourg) Anne Kremer (fourth round)
27. (Russia) Elena Likhovtseva (third round)
28. (Russia) Anastasia Myskina (fourth round)
29. (Spain) Conchita Martínez (second round)
30. (Italy) Adriana Serra Zanetti (third round)
31. (Slovakia) Martina Suchá (third round)
32. (Australia) Nicole Pratt (third round)

== Draw ==
=== Key ===
- Q = Qualifier
- WC = Wild card
- LL = Lucky loser
- Alt = Alternate
- SE = Special exempt
- PR = Protected ranking
- ITF = ITF entry
- JE = Junior exempt
- w/o = Walkover
- r = Retired
- d = Defaulted
- SR = Special ranking

=== Finals ===
Quarterfinals
(Switzerland) Emmanuelle Gagliardi	6	6
(Israel) Anna Smashnova	2	1
18	(Slovakia) Daniela Hantuchová	6	6
12	(United States) Lisa Raymond	4	2
9	(Spain) Arantxa Sánchez Vicario	3	6	3
4	(United States) Monica Seles	6	3	6
10	(South Africa) Amanda Coetzer	1	2
2	(Switzerland) Martina Hingis	6	6

Semifinals
(Switzerland) Emmanuelle Gagliardi	6	0	4
18	(Slovakia) Daniela Hantuchová	4	6	6
4	(United States) Monica Seles	3	2
2	(Switzerland) Martina Hingis	6	6

Final
18	(Slovakia) Daniela Hantuchová	6	6
2	(Switzerland) Martina Hingis	3	4

=== Top half ===
==== Section 1 ====
First round
(France) N Dechy	6	6
(France) C Beigbeder	1	0
WC	(United States) T Snyder	1	6	6
(Italy) T Garbin	6	3	3
Q	(Slovakia) Ľ Cervanová	3	4
(Slovakia) J Husárová	6	6
(Sweden) Å Svensson	4	1
(Switzerland) E Gagliardi	6	6

Second round
1	(Belgium) K Clijsters	2	5
(France) N Dechy	6	7
WC	(United States) T Snyder	3	2
28	(Russia) A Myskina	6	6
21	(Spain) M Serna	3	3
(Slovakia) J Husárová	6	6
(Switzerland) E Gagliardi	6	6
15	(Spain) Á Montolio	1	4

Third round
(France) N Dechy	6^{2}	5
28	(Russia) A Myskina	7^{7}	7
(Slovakia) J Husárová	2	0
(Switzerland) E Gagliardi	6	6

Fourth round
28	(Russia) A Myskina	6	6^{4}	6^{5}
(Switzerland) E Gagliardi	1	7^{7}	7^{7}

==== Section 2 ====
First round
Q	(Hungary) Z Gubacsi	6	4	1
Q	(Denmark) E Dyrberg	3	6	6
(Israel) A Smashnova	6	6
WC	(United States) M Middleton	4	3
(Slovenia) T Pisnik	5	6	6
(Czech Republic) K Hrdličková	7	4	3
(Germany) M Müller	4	6	6
(Argentina) M Díaz Oliva	6	4	0

Second round
11	(Bulgaria) M Maleeva	2	3
Q	(Denmark) E Dyrberg	6	6
(Israel) A Smashnova	6	7^{7}
20	(Italy) R Grande	1	6^{4}
32	(Australia) N Pratt	2	6	6
(Slovenia) T Pisnik	6	4	3
(Germany) M Müller	2	4
6	(United States) M Shaughnessy	6	6

Third round
Q	(Denmark) E Dyrberg	6	3	2
(Israel) A Smashnova	1	6	6
32	(Australia) N Pratt	4	1
6	(United States) M Shaughnessy	6	6

Fourth round
(Israel) A Smashnova	4	6	6
6	(United States) M Shaughnessy	6	3	1

==== Section 3 ====
First round
(Slovenia) M Matevžič	6	6
WC	(Croatia) M Lučić	3	4
(Paraguay) R de los Ríos	6	6
WC	(United States) L Granville	4	0
(Argentina) P Suárez	7^{7}	3	2
(Belarus) T Poutchek	6^{5}	6	6
(Germany) B Lamade	6	1	6
(Germany) B Rittner	2	6	4

Second round
3	(Belgium) J Henin	5	6	6
(Slovenia) M Matevžič	7	4	4
(Paraguay) R de los Ríos	3	3
30	(Italy) A Serra Zanetti	6	6
18	(Slovakia) D Hantuchová	6	6
(Belarus) T Poutchek	2	2
(Germany) B Lamade	4	4
16	(Austria) B Schett	6	6

Third round
3	(Belgium) J Henin	6	6
30	(Italy) A Serra Zanetti	3	0
18	(Slovakia) D Hantuchová	5	6	6
16	(Austria) B Schett	7	4	1

Fourth round
3	(Belgium) J Henin	3	3
18	(Slovakia) D Hantuchová	6	6

==== Section 4 ====
First round
(United States) M Irvin	6	6
(Spain) V Ruano Pascual	1	4
(Netherlands) M Oremans	7	6^{5}	6
Q	(United States) M Washington	5	7^{7}	3
(Hungary) P Mandula	6	7^{7}
WC	(Belarus) O Barabanschikova	4	6^{4}
LL	(United States) S Reeves	3	1
(Russia) E Bovina	6	6

Second round
12	(United States) L Raymond	6	3	6
(United States) M Irvin	3	6	3
(Netherlands) M Oremans	2	3
24	(Russia) T Panova	6	6
26	(Luxembourg) A Kremer	4	6	6
(Hungary) P Mandula	6	3	3
(Russia) E Bovina	6	3	2
5	(Federal Republic of Yugoslavia) J Dokić	4	6	6

Third round
12	(United States) L Raymond	6	6
24	(Russia) T Panova	2	1
26	(Luxembourg) A Kremer	6	6
5	(Federal Republic of Yugoslavia) J Dokić	3	0

Fourth round
12	(United States) L Raymond	6	6
26	(Luxembourg) A Kremer	2	3

=== Bottom half ===
==== Section 5 ====
First round
(United States) M Tu	4	4
(Australia) E Dominikovic	6	6
(United States) L Osterloh	6	6
(Russia) A Kournikova	1	4
(Hungary) R Kuti-Kis	1	4
Q	(Germany) G Arn	6	6
(Puerto Rico) K Brandi	3	r
WC	(Slovenia) K Srebotnik	6

Second round
7	(Italy) S Farina Elia	6	3	6
(Australia) E Dominikovic	4	6	4
(United States) L Osterloh	6	6^{6}	7
29	(Spain) C Martínez	1	7^{8}	5
19	(Czech Republic) D Bedáňová	6	7
Q	(Germany) G Arn	4	5
WC	(Slovenia) K Srebotnik	4	6	1
9	(Spain) A Sánchez-Vicario	6	4	6

Third round
7	(Italy) S Farina Elia	6	6
(United States) L Osterloh	4	3
19	(Czech Republic) D Bedáňová	4	4
9	(Spain) A Sánchez-Vicario	6	6

Fourth round
7	(Italy) S Farina Elia	4	6^{4}
9	(Spain) A Sánchez-Vicario	6	7^{7}

==== Section 6 ====
First round
Q	(Croatia) J Kostanić	6	6
(Germany) M Weingärtner	3	1
(Greece) E Daniilidou	6	6
(Czech Republic) A Gerši	1	4
(Canada) J Nejedly	6	7
Q	(Germany) A Roesch	4	5
WC	(Russia) M Sharapova	5	6	6
(United States) B Rippner	7	1	2

Second round
13	(Uzbekistan) I Tulyaganova	6	6
Q	(Croatia) J Kostanić	3	3
(Greece) E Daniilidou	4	6	1
22	(Japan) A Sugiyama	6	3	6
31	(Slovakia) M Suchá	6	6
(Canada) J Nejedly	3	0
WC	(Russia) M Sharapova	0	2
4	(United States) M Seles	6	6

Third round
13	(Uzbekistan) I Tulyaganova	2	3
22	(Japan) A Sugiyama	6	6
31	(Slovakia) M Suchá	0	3
4	(United States) M Seles	6	6

Fourth round
22	(Japan) A Sugiyama	0	1
4	(United States) M Seles	6	6

==== Section 7 ====
First round
Q	(Spain) N Llagostera Vives	6	3	3
(United States) A Frazier	3	6	6
WC	(United States) E deLone	6	4	3
Q	(Czech Republic) S Kleinová	1	6	6
(Spain) M Marrero	6	6
(Australia) R McQuillan	4	3
(Croatia) I Majoli	6^{5}	1
Q	(France) V Razzano	7^{7}	6

Second round
8	(Russia) E Dementieva	6	1	6
(United States) A Frazier	3	6	3
Q	(Czech Republic) S Kleinová	2	2
25	(United States) A Stevenson	6	6
17	(Italy) F Schiavone	4	3
(Spain) M Marrero	6	6
Q	(France) V Razzano	4	4
10	(South Africa) A Coetzer	6	6

Third round
8	(Russia) E Dementieva	4	6	4
25	(United States) A Stevenson	6	0	6
(Spain) M Marrero	6	5	0
10	(South Africa) A Coetzer	4	7	6

Fourth round
25	(United States) A Stevenson	1	7	5
10	(South Africa) A Coetzer	6	5	7

==== Section 8 ====
First round
(Germany) J Kandarr	6	6
(Spain) G León García	4	4
(Tunisia) S Sfar	6	4	3
(Zimbabwe) C Black	4	6	6
(United States) J Hopkins	6	6
Q	(France) S Foretz	2	1
(Kazakhstan) I Selyutina	2	2
Q	(Croatia) S Talaja	6	6

Second round
14	(Thailand) T Tanasugarn	6	6
(Germany) J Kandarr	2	3
(Zimbabwe) C Black	6	6
23	(Spain) C Torrens Valero	4	1
27	(Russia) E Likhovtseva	7	6
(United States) J Hopkins	5	0
Q	(Croatia) S Talaja	0	1
2	(Switzerland) M Hingis	6	6

Third round
14	(Thailand) T Tanasugarn	6	5	1
(Zimbabwe) C Black	3	7	6
27	(Russia) E Likhovtseva	3	3
2	(Switzerland) M Hingis	6	6

Fourth round
(Zimbabwe) C Black	0	3
2	(Switzerland) M Hingis	6	6

== Qualifying ==
=== Qualifying seeds ===
1. (Russia) Alina Jidkova (first round)
2. (Hungary) Zsófia Gubacsi (qualified)
3. (Croatia) Jelena Kostanić (qualified)
4. (Slovakia) Ľudmila Cervanová (qualified)
5. (Spain) Eva Bes (first round)
6. (United States) Samantha Reeves (qualifying competition, Lucky loser)
7. (Croatia) Silvija Talaja (qualified)
8. (Argentina) María Emilia Salerni (qualifying competition)
9. (Germany) Anca Barna (first round)
10. (Germany) Gréta Arn (qualified)
11. (France) Virginie Razzano (qualified)
12. (United States) Jill Craybas (first round)
13. (Denmark) Eva Dyrberg (qualified)
14. (France) Émilie Loit (qualifying competition)
15. (Bulgaria) Lubomira Bacheva (qualifying competition)
16. (Spain) Nuria Llagostera Vives (qualified)
17. (Spain) María José Martínez Sánchez (qualifying competition)
18. (United States) Sarah Taylor (first round)
19. (Hungary) Anikó Kapros (qualifying competition)
20. (United States) Mashona Washington (qualified)
21. (Ukraine) Tatiana Perebiynis (first round)
22. (Czech Republic) Klára Koukalová (first round)
23. (France) Stéphanie Foretz (qualified)
24. (Croatia) Maja Palaveršić (first round)

=== Qualifiers ===
1. (United States) Mashona Washington
2. (Hungary) Zsófia Gubacsi
3. (Croatia) Jelena Kostanić
4. (Slovakia) Ľudmila Cervanová
5. (Germany) Angelika Rösch
6. (Denmark) Eva Dyrberg
7. (Croatia) Silvija Talaja
8. (France) Stéphanie Foretz
9. (Czech Republic) Sandra Kleinová
10. (Germany) Gréta Arn
11. (France) Virginie Razzano
12. (Spain) Nuria Llagostera Vives

=== Lucky loser ===
1. (United States) Samantha Reeves

=== Qualifying draw ===
==== First qualifier ====
First round					Qualifying competition
1	(Russia) Alina Jidkova	6	2	1
	(Russia) Evgenia Kulikovskaya	4	6	6		(Russia) Evgenia Kulikovskaya	4	0
	(Australia) Bryanne Stewart	1	5		20	(United States) Mashona Washington	6	6
20	(United States) Mashona Washington	6	7

==== Second qualifier ====
First round					Qualifying competition
2	(Hungary) Zsófia Gubacsi	6	6
WC	(United States) Anne Yelsey	0	0		2	(Hungary) Zsófia Gubacsi	6	7
	(Italy) Valentina Sassi	3	6	6		(Italy) Valentina Sassi	3	5
24	(Croatia) Maja Palaveršić	6	1	4

==== Third qualifier ====
First round					Qualifying competition
3	(Croatia) Jelena Kostanić	6	6
	(Canada) Vanessa Webb	4	4		3	(Croatia) Jelena Kostanić	6	6
	(Switzerland) Miroslava Vavrinec	0	6	2	14	(France) Émilie Loit	3	3
14	(France) Émilie Loit	6	4	6

==== Fourth qualifier ====
First round				Qualifying competition
4	(Slovakia) Ľudmila Cervanová	6	6
WC	(United States) Cory Ann Avants	3	4	4	(Slovakia) Ľudmila Cervanová	6	5	7
	(Czech Republic) Alena Vašková	7^{7}	7^{7}		(Czech Republic) Alena Vašková	2	7	5
21	(Ukraine) Tatiana Perebiynis	6^{3}	6^{2}

==== Fifth qualifier ====
First round					Qualifying competition
5	(Spain) Eva Bes	4	4
	(Germany) Angelika Rösch	6	6			(Germany) Angelika Rösch	6	6
	(Germany) Andrea Glass	6	3	3	17	(Spain) María José Martínez Sánchez	4	4
17	(Spain) María José Martínez Sánchez	4	6	6

==== Sixth qualifier ====
First round				Qualifying competition
6	(United States) Samantha Reeves	7^{7}	7^{7}
	(Austria) Patricia Wartusch	6^{3}	6^{4}	6	(United States) Samantha Reeves	3	4
	(Italy) Antonella Serra Zanetti	6^{6}	2	13	(Denmark) Eva Dyrberg	6	6
13	(Denmark) Eva Dyrberg	7^{8}	6

==== Seventh qualifier ====
First round				Qualifying competition
7	(Croatia) Silvija Talaja	6	6
	(South Africa) Liezel Huber	0	3	7	(Croatia) Silvija Talaja	6	6
WC	(United States) Casey Cross	3	4	15	(Bulgaria) Lubomira Bacheva	3	2
15	(Bulgaria) Lubomira Bacheva	6	6

==== Eighth qualifier ====
First round					Qualifying competition
8	(Argentina) María Emilia Salerni	4	7^{7}	6
	(France) Alexandra Fusai	6	6^{3}	3	8	(Argentina) María Emilia Salerni	6	3	1
	(Canada) Marie-Ève Pelletier	1	3		23	(France) Stéphanie Foretz	2	6	6
23	(France) Stéphanie Foretz	6	6

==== Ninth qualifier ====
First round					Qualifying competition
9	(Germany) Anca Barna	4	1
	(Czech Republic) Sandra Kleinová	6	6		(Czech Republic) Sandra Kleinová	4	6	7^{7}
	(France) Anne-Gaëlle Sidot	4	6	6	(France) Anne-Gaëlle Sidot	6	2	6^{2}
22	(Czech Republic) Klára Koukalová	6	3	1

==== Tenth qualifier ====
First round					Qualifying competition
10	(Germany) Gréta Arn	6	6
	(Ukraine) Elena Tatarkova	1	3		10	(Germany) Gréta Arn	6	6
WC	(United Kingdom) Lucie Ahl	6	4	6	WC	(United Kingdom) Lucie Ahl	3	3
18	(United States) Sarah Taylor	1	6	2

==== Eleventh qualifier ====
First round				Qualifying competition
11	(France) Virginie Razzano	6	6
	(United States) Ansley Cargill	1	2	11	(France) Virginie Razzano	6	3
WC	(United States) Amber Liu	0	4	19	(Hungary) Anikó Kapros	4	0^{r}
19	(Hungary) Anikó Kapros	6	6

==== Twelfth qualifier ====
First round				Qualifying competition
12	(United States) Jill Craybas	0	6^{2}
WC	(Argentina) Gisela Dulko	6	7^{7}	WC	(Argentina) Gisela Dulko	5	6^{3}
	(United States) Allison Bradshaw	2	4	16	(Spain) Nuria Llagostera Vives	7	7^{7}
16	(Spain) Nuria Llagostera Vives	6	6
