= 2001 Croatian Bol Ladies Open =

- Date: 30 April – 6 May
- Edition: 8th
- Category: Tier III
- Draw: 30S / 16D
- Prize money: $170,000
- Surface: Clay / outdoor
- Location: Bol, Croatia

Champions

Singles
- (Spain) Ángeles Montolio

Doubles
- (Spain) María José Martínez / (Spain) Anabel Medina Garrigues
← 2000 ·	Croatian Bol Ladies Open	· 2002 →

The 2001 Croatian Bol Ladies Open was a women's tennis tournament played on outdoor clay courts in Bol, Croatia and was part of the Tier III category of the 2001 WTA Tour. It was the eighth edition of the tournament and was held from 30 April until 6 May 2001. Third-seeded Ángeles Montolio won the singles title and earned $27,000 first-prize money.

== Finals ==
=== Singles ===
(Spain) Ángeles Montolio defeated (Argentina) Mariana Díaz Oliva 3–6, 6–2, 6–4

- It was Montolio's 2nd singles title of the year and the 2nd of her career.

=== Doubles ===
(Spain) María José Martínez / (Spain) Anabel Medina Garrigues defeated (Russia) Nadia Petrova / (Slovenia) Tina Pisnik 7–5, 6–4

- It was Martínez's 3rd title of the year and the 3rd of her career. It was Medina Garrigues' 3rd title of the year and the 3rd of her career.

== See also ==
- 2001 Croatia Open
