= Matea Mezak =

Croatian tennis player (born 1985)

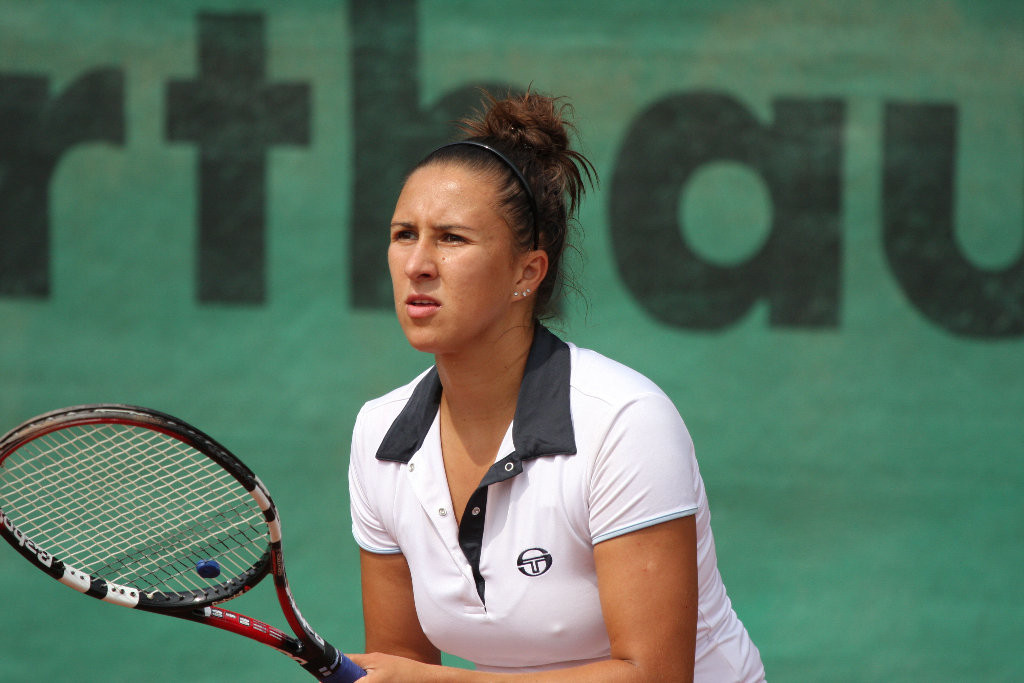
- Country (sports): Croatia
- Residence: Zagreb, Croatia
- Born: 5 March 1985 (age 40); Zagreb, SR Croatia, SFR Yugoslavia
- Turned pro: 2002
- Retired: 2014
- Plays: Right-handed (two-handed backhand)
- Prize money: $68,820

Singles
- Career record: 171–108
- Career titles: 1 ITF
- Highest ranking: No. 208 (4 July 2005)

Doubles
- Career record: 86–61
- Career titles: 6 ITF
- Highest ranking: No. 135 (2 October 2006)

Matea Mezak (Croatian pronunciation: [mězak]; born 5 March 1985) is a Croatian former professional tennis player. 2004, she started on the ITF Circuit, where she won six singles and six doubles titles.

Her preferred surface is hardcourt, and her coach was Ivan Humić.

Along with Svetlana Kuznetsova, she reached 2002 Australian Open junior doubles competition, where they lost to Indonesian Angelique Widjaja and Argentine Gisela Dulko.

Mezak also was on the Croatia Fed Cup team, in 2005 and 2006.

In April 2014, she played her last match on the pro circuit.

== ITF Circuit finals ==
$50,000 tournaments
$25,000 tournaments
$10,000 tournaments

=== Singles: 12 (6–6) ===
Result	No.	Date	Tournament	Surface	Opponent	Score
Win	1	Feb 2003	ITF Tipton, United Kingdom	Hard (i)	(Kazakhstan) Galina Voskoboeva	4–6, 6–4, 6–4
Loss	1	Apr 2003	ITF Makarska, Croatia	Clay	(Argentina) Natalia Garbellotto	6–7^{(5)}, 5–7
Loss	2	May 2003	ITF Casale Monferrato, Italy	Clay	(Italy) Silvia Disderi	1–6, 6–1, 2–6
Win	2	May 2004	ITF Casale Monferrato, Italy	Clay	(Switzerland) Romina Oprandi	2–0 ret.
Loss	3	May 2004	ITF Zadar, Croatia	Clay	(Luxembourg) Mandy Minella	5–7, 7–5, 4–6
Win	3	Oct 2008	ITF Casale Monferrato, Italy	Clay	(Italy) Silvia Disderi	7–5, 2–6, 6–1
Loss	4	Oct 2008	ITF Dubrovnik, Croatia	Clay	(Czech Republic) Darina Sedenkova	6–4, 0–6, 4–6
Loss	5	Aug 2009	ITF Braunschweig, Germany	Clay	(Germany) Korina Perkovic	6–2, 3–6, 2–6
Win	4	Sep 2009	ITF Doboj, Bosnia & Herzegovina	Clay	(Serbia) Tamara Čurović	4–6, 6–2, 6–4
Win	5	Oct 2009	ITF Dubrovnik, Croatia	Clay	(Hungary) Réka Luca Jani	0–6, 7–5, 7–6^{(4)}
Loss	6	Nov 2009	ITF Sunderland, United Kingdom	Hard (i)	(Hungary) Tímea Babos	6–7^{(2)}, 4–6
Win	6	Nov 2009	ITF Jersey, United Kingdom	Hard (i)	(Hungary) Tímea Babos	6–2, 6–3

=== Doubles: 14 (6–8) ===
Result	No.	Date	Tournament	Surface	Partnering	Opponents	Score
Loss	1.	24 November 2002	ITF Zagreb, Croatia	Hard (i)	(Croatia) Jelena Kostanić Tošić	(Bosnia and Herzegovina) Mervana Jugić-Salkić (Croatia) Karolina Šprem	2–6, 4–6
Loss	2.	27 July 2003	ITF Ancona, Italy	Clay	(Croatia) Petra Dizdar	(Argentina) María José Argeri (Italy) Giulia Meruzzi	3–6, 3–6
Loss	3.	18 July 2004	ITF Monteroni, Italy	Clay	(Croatia) Nadja Pavić	(Italy) Valentina Sulpizio (Czech Republic) Sandra Záhlavová	5–7, 6–4, 6–7^{(5)}
Win	4.	16 October 2005	ITF Joué-lès-Tours, France	Hard (i)	(Croatia) Jelena Kostanić Tošić	(Hungary) Zsófia Gubacsi (Belarus) Darya Kustova	6–4, 6–4
Win	5.	2 February 2006	ITF Jersey, United Kingdom	Hard (i)	(Czech Republic) Andrea Hlaváčková	(United Kingdom) Katie O'Brien (United Kingdom) Melanie South	6–3, 6–1
Win	6.	1 April 2006	ITF Poza Rica, Mexico	Hard	(Czech Republic) Renata Voráčová	(Hungary) Zsófia Gubacsi (Hungary) Kyra Nagy	6–2, 1–0 ret.
Win	7.	15 April 2006	ITF San Luis Potosí, Mexico	Clay	(Hungary) Zsófia Gubacsi	(Brazil) Joana Cortez (Spain) María José Martínez Sánchez	4–6, 6–4, 6–4
Loss	8.	7 May 2006	ITF Antalya, Turkey	Clay	(Turkey) İpek Şenoğlu	(Israel) Tzipi Obziler (Switzerland) Romina Oprandi	6–4, 4–6, 0–6
Loss	9.	26 May 2006	ITF La Palma, Spain	Hard	(Croatia) Nadja Pavić	(Czech Republic) Petra Kvitová (Poland) Karolina Kosińska	6–4, 3–6, 4–6
Win	10.	22 July 2006	ITF Rome, Italy	Clay	(Croatia) Nika Ožegović	(Croatia) Darija Jurak (Hungary) Kyra Nagy	6–2, 6–3
Loss	11.	29 July 2006	ITF Monteroni d'Arbia, Italy	Clay	(Croatia) Nika Ožegović	(Italy) Valentina Sassi (France) Aurélie Védy	7–5, 4–6, 0–6
Win	12.	16 September 2006	ITF Sofia, Bulgaria	Clay	(Croatia) Nika Ožegović	(Montenegro) Danica Krstajić (Slovenia) Maša Zec Peškirič	6–4, 6–3
Loss	13.	18 February 2013	ITF Kreuzlingen, Switzerland	Carpet (i)	(Croatia) Silvia Njirić	(Switzerland) Timea Bacsinszky (Switzerland) Xenia Knoll	3–6, 2–6
Loss	14.	12 May 2013	ITF Athens, Greece	Hard	(Croatia) Silvia Njirić	(United States) Erin Clark (United Kingdom) Francesca Stephenson	7–5, 3–6, [8–10]
