= 2002 Pacific Life Open – Men's doubles =

Men's doubles
- 2002 Pacific Life Open

Final
- Champions: (The Bahamas) Mark Knowles (Canada) Daniel Nestor
- Runners-up: (Switzerland) Roger Federer (Belarus) Max Mirnyi
- Score: 6–4, 6–4

Events
Singles	men	women
Doubles	men	women
← 2001 ·	Pacific Life Open	· 2003 →

Wayne Ferreira and Yevgeny Kafelnikov were the defending champions but lost in the first round to Mark Knowles and Daniel Nestor.

Knowles and Nestor won in the final 6–4, 6–4 against Roger Federer and Max Mirnyi.

== Seeds ==
1. (United States) Donald Johnson / (United States) Jared Palmer (semifinals)
2. (The Bahamas) Mark Knowles / (Canada) Daniel Nestor (champions)
3. (Czech Republic) Jiří Novák / (Czech Republic) David Rikl (second round)
4. (Sweden) Jonas Björkman / (Australia) Todd Woodbridge (semifinals)
5. (Zimbabwe) Wayne Black / (Zimbabwe) Kevin Ullyett (quarterfinals)
6. (South Africa) Ellis Ferreira / (United States) Rick Leach (first round)
7. (Australia) Joshua Eagle / (Australia) Sandon Stolle (quarterfinals)
8. (United States) Bob Bryan / (United States) Mike Bryan (quarterfinals)

== Draw ==
=== Key ===
- Q = Qualifier
- WC = Wild card
- LL = Lucky loser
- Alt = Alternate
- SE = Special exempt
- PR = Protected ranking
- ITF = ITF entry
- JE = Junior exempt
- w/o = Walkover
- r = Retired
- d = Defaulted
- SR = Special ranking

=== Final ===
Semifinals
1	(United States) Donald Johnson (United States) Jared Palmer	3	4
(Switzerland) Roger Federer (Belarus) Max Mirnyi	6	6
4	(Sweden) Jonas Björkman (Australia) Todd Woodbridge	6^{7}	3
2	(The Bahamas) Mark Knowles (Canada) Daniel Nestor	7^{9}	6

Final
(Switzerland) Roger Federer (Belarus) Max Mirnyi	4	4
2	(The Bahamas) Mark Knowles (Canada) Daniel Nestor	6	6

=== Top half ===
First round
1	(United States) D Johnson (United States) J Palmer	7	6
(Czech Republic) P Pála (Czech Republic) P Vízner	5	3
(Australia) A Florent (Australia) D Macpherson	6^{1}	6	7
(Czech Republic) R Štěpánek (Czech Republic) C Suk	7^{7}	3	5
(Australia) M Hill (United States) B MacPhie	2	1
(France) J Boutter (Netherlands) S Schalken	6	6
(Czech Republic) M Damm (Germany) D Prinosil	7^{7}	6
6	(South Africa) E Ferreira (United States) R Leach	6^{3}	3
3	(Czech Republic) J Novák (Czech Republic) D Rikl	6	6
(Sweden) S Aspelin (Australia) A Kratzmann	2	2
(Switzerland) R Federer (Belarus) M Mirnyi	6	6
(South Africa) D Adams (United States) J Tarango	2	2
(South Africa) J-L de Jager (India) L Paes	2	6	4
(France) M Llodra (France) F Santoro	6	4	6
(France) A Clément (South Africa) C Haggard	6^{2}	2
8	(United States) B Bryan (United States) M Bryan	7^{7}	6

Second round
1	(United States) D Johnson (United States) J Palmer	6	1	6
(Australia) A Florent (Australia) D Macpherson	1	6	4
(France) J Boutter (Netherlands) S Schalken	6	0	6
(Czech Republic) M Damm (Germany) D Prinosil	4	6	4
3	(Czech Republic) J Novák (Czech Republic) D Rikl	1	4
(Switzerland) R Federer (Belarus) M Mirnyi	6	6
(France) M Llodra (France) F Santoro	6	3	3
8	(United States) B Bryan (United States) M Bryan	3	6	6

Quarterfinals
1	(United States) D Johnson (United States) J Palmer	7^{7}	6
(France) J Boutter (Netherlands) S Schalken	6^{1}	4
(Switzerland) R Federer (Belarus) M Mirnyi	6	6
8	(United States) B Bryan (United States) M Bryan	4	3

Semifinals
1	(United States) D Johnson (United States) J Palmer	3	4
(Switzerland) R Federer (Belarus) M Mirnyi	6	6

=== Bottom half ===
First round
5	(Zimbabwe) W Black (Zimbabwe) K Ullyett	6	7^{7}
(Sweden) T Enqvist (Sweden) T Johansson	4	6^{4}
(India) M Bhupathi (United States) J-M Gambill	6	7^{7}
(Spain) J C Ferrero (Spain) T Robredo	3	6^{1}
WC	(France) S Grosjean (Germany) N Kiefer	5
WC	(Croatia) G Ivanišević (Croatia) I Ljubičić	2^{r}
WC	(United States) J Blake (United States) M Fish	1	2
4	(Sweden) J Björkman (Australia) T Woodbridge	6	6
7	(Australia) J Eagle (Australia) S Stolle	6	4	6
(Germany) T Haas (Belgium) X Malisse	4	6	1
(Spain) A Costa (Russia) M Safin	2	7^{7}	5
(Argentina) G Cañas (Germany) R Schüttler	6	6^{3}	7
(France) N Escudé (United Kingdom) T Henman	2	6^{8}
(Argentina) L Arnold (Argentina) G Etlis	6	7^{10}
(South Africa) W Ferreira (Russia) Y Kafelnikov	6	0	1
2	(The Bahamas) M Knowles (Canada) D Nestor	3	6	6

Second round
5	(Zimbabwe) W Black (Zimbabwe) K Ullyett	7^{7}	6
(India) M Bhupathi (United States) J-M Gambill	6^{4}	2
WC	(France) S Grosjean (Germany) N Kiefer	1	1
4	(Sweden) J Björkman (Australia) T Woodbridge	6	6
7	(Australia) J Eagle (Australia) S Stolle	6	3	6
(Argentina) G Cañas (Germany) R Schüttler	3	6	2
(Argentina) L Arnold (Argentina) G Etlis	6	1	3
2	(The Bahamas) M Knowles (Canada) D Nestor	3	6	6

Quarterfinals
5	(Zimbabwe) W Black (Zimbabwe) K Ullyett	4	6^{3}
4	(Sweden) J Björkman (Australia) T Woodbridge	6	7^{7}
7	(Australia) J Eagle (Australia) S Stolle	4	2
2	(The Bahamas) M Knowles (Canada) D Nestor	6	6

Semifinals
4	(Sweden) J Björkman (Australia) T Woodbridge	6^{7}	3
2	(The Bahamas) M Knowles (Canada) D Nestor	7^{9}	6
