= 2001 Croatian Bol Ladies Open – Singles =

Singles
- 2001 Croatian Bol Ladies Open

Final
- Champion: (Spain) Ángeles Montolio
- Runner-up: (Argentina) Mariana Díaz Oliva
- Score: 3–6, 6–2, 6–4

Details
- Draw: 30
- Seeds: 8

Events
Singles	Doubles
- Croatian Bol Ladies Open

Tina Pisnik was the defending champion but lost in the quarterfinals to Ángeles Montolio.

Montolio won in the final 3–6, 6–2, 6–4 against Mariana Díaz Oliva.

== Seeds ==
A champion seed is indicated in bold text while text in italics indicates the round in which that seed was eliminated. The top two seeds received a bye to the second round.

1. (Belgium) Kim Clijsters (finals)
2. (France) Sandrine Testud (semifinals)
3. (Spain) **Ángeles Montolio (champion)**
4. (Croatia) Silvija Talaja (first round)
5. (Germany) Marlene Weingärtner (quarterfinals)
6. (United States) Meilen Tu (second round)
7. (Japan) Ai Sugiyama (second round)
8. (France) Nathalie Dechy (second round)

== Draw ==
Key

- Q = Qualifier
- WC = Wild card
- LL = Lucky loser
- Alt = Alternate
- ITF = ITF entry
- PR = Protected ranking
- SR = Special ranking
- SE = Special exempt
- JE = Junior exempt
- JR = Junior Accelerator Programme entrant
- CO = College Accelerator Programme entrant
- NG = Next Gen Accelerator Program entrant
- w/o = Walkover
- r = Retired
- d = Defaulted

=== Final ===
Final
	(Argentina) Mariana Díaz Oliva	**6**	2	4
3	(Spain) **Ángeles Montolio**	3	**6**	**6**

=== Top half ===
First round
(France) **É Loit**	**6**	3	**4**
(Spain) C Torrens Valero	4	**6**	3/r
(New Zealand) **P Nola**	4	**6**	**6**
Q	(Belarus) N Ostrovskaya	**6**	2	3
Q	(Italy) N Viérin	**6**	6^{7}	2
8	(France) **N Dechy**	1	**7^{9}**	**6**
4	(Croatia) S Talaja	4	r
WC	(Croatia) **J Kostanić**	**6**
(Argentina) **M Díaz Oliva**	4	**6**	**6**
(United States) D Buth	**6**	1	3
(Spain) A Medina Garrigues	**6**	6^{3}	4
(Israel) **A Smashnova**	2	**7^{7}**	**6**
(South Africa) J Kruger	3	4
6	(United States) **M Tu**	**6**	**6**

Second round
1	(Belgium) **K Clijsters**	**6**	**6**
(France) É Loit	1	3
(New Zealand) **P Nola**	**6**	**6**
8	(France) N Dechy	4	2
WC	(Croatia) J Kostanić	4	2
(Argentina) **M Díaz Oliva**	**6**	**6**
(Israel) **A Smashnova**	4	**6**	**6**
6	(United States) M Tu	**6**	3	1

Quarterfinals
1	(Belgium) **K Clijsters**	**7^{7}**	**6**
(New Zealand) P Nola	6^{4}	1
(Argentina) **M Díaz Oliva**	**6**	**6**
(Israel) A Smashnova	1	1

Semifinals
1	(Belgium) K Clijsters	**6**	2	3
(Argentina) **M Díaz Oliva**	0	**6**	**6**

=== Bottom half ===
First round
7	(Japan) **A Sugiyama**	**6**	0	**6**
(United States) C Morariu	2	**6**	3
(Slovenia) **T Pisnik**	**6**	**6**
(Belarus) T Poutchek	2	3
(Spain) **M Marrero**	**6**	4	**6**
Q	(Ukraine) J Vakulenko	4	**6**	1
(Russia) N Petrova	**6**	3	1
3	(Spain) **Á Montolio**	0	**6**	**6**
5	(Germany) **M Weingärtner**	**6**	**7**
Q	(Czech Republic) Z Ondrášková	3	5
WC	(Australia) J Hewitt	5	5
(Spain) **M J Martínez**	**7**	**7**
(Hungary) **R Kuti-Kis**	**6**	4	**6**
(France) V Razzano	2	**6**	3

Second round
7	(Japan) A Sugiyama	5	1
(Slovenia) **T Pisnik**	**7**	**6**
(Spain) M Marrero	**6**	3	1
3	(Spain) **Á Montolio**	0	**6**	**6**
5	(Germany) **M Weingärtner**	**6**	**7**
(Spain) M J Martínez	3	5
(Hungary) R Kuti-Kis	2	3
2	(France) **S Testud**	**6**	**6**

Quarterfinals
(Slovenia) T Pisnik	**6**	6^{4}	1
3	(Spain) **Á Montolio**	4	**7^{7}**	**6**
5	(Germany) M Weingärtner	**6**	1	2
2	(France) **S Testud**	4	**6**	**6**

Semifinals
3	(Spain) **Á Montolio**	**6**	**7**
2	(France) S Testud	1	5
