= 2015 BNP Paribas Open – Women's singles =

Women's singles
- 2015 BNP Paribas Open

Final
- Champion: (Romania) Simona Halep
- Runner-up: (Serbia) Jelena Janković
- Score: 2–6, 7–5, 6–4

Details
- Draw: 96
- Seeds: 32

Events
Singles	men	women
Doubles	men	women
- Indian Wells Open

Simona Halep defeated Jelena Janković in the final, 2–6, 7–5, 6–4 to win the women's singles tennis title at the 2015 Indian Wells Masters.

Flavia Pennetta was the defending champion, but lost in the quarterfinals to Sabine Lisicki.

This tournament marked Serena Williams's return to the Indian Wells Masters for the first time since she won the title in 2001. Both Serena and her sister Venus Williams boycotted the tournament due to racism surrounding Venus' withdrawal before their 2001 semifinal match. Serena reached the semifinals before withdrawing with a knee injury.

== Seeds ==
All seeds received a bye into the second round.

1. (United States) Serena Williams (semifinals, withdrew because of a right knee injury)
2. (Russia) Maria Sharapova (fourth round)
3. (Romania) Simona Halep (champion)
4. (Denmark) Caroline Wozniacki (third round)
5. (Serbia) Ana Ivanovic (third round)
6. (Canada) Eugenie Bouchard (fourth round)
7. (Poland) Agnieszka Radwańska (third round)
8. (Russia) Ekaterina Makarova (third round)
9. (Germany) Andrea Petkovic (second round)
10. (Czech Republic) Lucie Šafářová (third round)
11. (Italy) Sara Errani (third round)
12. (Spain) Carla Suárez Navarro (quarterfinals)
13. (Germany) Angelique Kerber (second round)
14. (Czech Republic) Karolína Plíšková (fourth round)
15. (Italy) Flavia Pennetta (quarterfinals)
16. (United States) Madison Keys (third round)

17. (Czech Republic) Barbora Záhlavová-Strýcová (second round)
18. (Serbia) Jelena Janković (final)
19. (Spain) Garbiñe Muguruza (third round)
20. (France) Alizé Cornet (third round)
21. (Australia) Samantha Stosur (third round)
22. (Russia) Svetlana Kuznetsova (third round)
23. (Ukraine) Elina Svitolina (fourth round)
24. (Germany) Sabine Lisicki (semifinals)
25. (France) Caroline Garcia (fourth round)
26. (United States) Varvara Lepchenko (third round)
27. (Switzerland) Timea Bacsinszky (quarterfinals)
28. (Kazakhstan) Zarina Diyas (third round)
29. (Italy) Camila Giorgi (second round)
30. (United States) CoCo Vandeweghe (third round)
31. (Switzerland) Belinda Bencic (fourth round)
32. (Belarus) Victoria Azarenka (third round)

Click on the seed number of a player to go to their draw section.

== Draw ==
Key

- Q = Qualifier
- WC = Wild card
- LL = Lucky loser
- Alt = Alternate
- ITF = ITF entry
- PR = Protected ranking
- SR = Special ranking
- SE = Special exempt
- JE = Junior exempt
- JR = Junior Accelerator Programme entrant
- CO = College Accelerator Programme entrant
- NG = Next Gen Accelerator Program entrant
- w/o = Walkover
- r = Retired
- d = Defaulted

=== Finals ===
Quarterfinals
1/WC	(United States) Serena Williams	7	6
27	(Switzerland) Timea Bacsinszky	5	3
3	(Romania) Simona Halep	6	7
12	(Spain) Carla Suárez Navarro	4	5
Q	(Ukraine) Lesia Tsurenko	1	1^{r}
18	(Serbia) Jelena Janković	6	4
24	(Germany) Sabine Lisicki	6	6^{3}	7^{7}
15	(Italy) Flavia Pennetta	4	7^{7}	6^{4}

Semifinals
1/WC	(United States) Serena Williams
3	(Romania) Simona Halep	w/o
18	(Serbia) Jelena Janković	3	6	6
24	(Germany) Sabine Lisicki	6	3	1

Final
3	(Romania) Simona Halep	2	7	6
18	(Serbia) Jelena Janković	6	5	4

=== Top half ===
==== Section 1 ====
First round
(Romania) M Niculescu	6	6
(Serbia) A Krunić	2	1
WC	(United States) L Chirico	4	3
(Croatia) D Vekić	6	6
(Czech Republic) K Siniaková	6	6
Q	(Russia) E Rodina	3	3
(United States) S Stephens	7	7
(South Africa) C Scheepers	5	5

Second round
1/WC	(United States) S Williams	7	7
(Romania) M Niculescu	5	5
(Croatia) D Vekić	3	3
28	(Kazakhstan) Z Diyas	6	6
22	(Russia) S Kuznetsova	7^{7}	6
(Czech Republic) K Siniaková	6^{2}	2
(United States) S Stephens	7^{8}	6
13	(Germany) A Kerber	6^{6}	2

Third round
1/WC	(United States) S Williams	6	6
28	(Kazakhstan) Z Diyas	2	0
22	(Russia) S Kuznetsova	6^{4}	6	4
(United States) S Stephens	7^{7}	1	6

Fourth round
1/WC	(United States) S Williams	6^{3}	6	6
(United States) S Stephens	7^{7}	2	2

==== Section 2 ====
First round
(Germany) M Barthel	6	5	6
(France) K Mladenovic	3	7	4
(Japan) K Nara	6	3	2
Q	(Belgium) A Van Uytvanck	4	6	6
(New Zealand) M Erakovic	6	6
WC	(United States) G Min	3	1
(Russia) E Vesnina	6	6
Q	(Ukraine) K Kozlova	3	3

Second round
10	(Czech Republic) L Šafářová	6	7^{7}
(Germany) M Barthel	4	6^{4}
Q	(Belgium) A Van Uytvanck	6	6^{4}	1
23	(Ukraine) E Svitolina	4	7^{7}	6
27	(Switzerland) T Bacsinszky	4	6	6
(New Zealand) M Erakovic	6	3	2
(Russia) E Vesnina	4	0
8	(Russia) E Makarova	6	6

Third round
10	(Czech Republic) L Šafářová	6^{5}	5
23	(Ukraine) E Svitolina	7^{7}	7
27	(Switzerland) T Bacsinszky	3	7	6
8	(Russia) E Makarova	6	5	4

Fourth round
23	(Ukraine) E Svitolina	6	1	1
27	(Switzerland) T Bacsinszky	4	6	6

==== Section 3 ====
First round
Q	(Russia) D Gavrilova	6	6
(Spain) S Soler Espinosa	3	4
(Russia) A Kudryavtseva	6^{6}	6^{6}
WC	(United States) S Vickery	7^{8}	7^{8}
WC	(United States) I Falconi	7^{8}	6
(Croatia) A Tomljanović	6^{6}	4
Q	(Spain) L Arruabarrena	6	6
(Slovakia) M Rybáriková	0	1

Second round
3	(Romania) S Halep	2	6	6
Q	(Russia) D Gavrilova	6	1	2
WC	(United States) S Vickery	4	1
26	(United States) V Lepchenko	6	6
19	(Spain) G Muguruza	4	6	6
WC	(United States) I Falconi	6	2	3
Q	(Spain) L Arruabarrena	3	5
14	(Czech Republic) Ka Plíšková	6	7

Third round
3	(Romania) S Halep	6	3	6
26	(United States) V Lepchenko	1	6	1
19	(Spain) G Muguruza	5	4
14	(Czech Republic) Ka Plíšková	7	6

Fourth round
3	(Romania) S Halep	6	6
14	(Czech Republic) Ka Plíšková	4	4

==== Section 4 ====
First round
WC	(United States) N Gibbs	3	5
(Puerto Rico) M Puig	6	7
(Russia) A Pavlyuchenkova	6	6
(Sweden) J Larsson	4	3
(Germany) J Görges	4	7	3
(United Kingdom) H Watson	6	5	6
(Croatia) M Lučić-Baroni	2	3
(United States) A Riske	6	6

Second round
12	(Spain) C Suárez Navarro	6	6
(Puerto Rico) M Puig	1	1
(Russia) A Pavlyuchenkova	6	6
17	(Czech Republic) B Záhlavová-Strýcová	3	3
29	(Italy) C Giorgi	5	5
(United Kingdom) H Watson	7	7
(United States) A Riske	3	1
7	(Poland) A Radwańska	6	6

Third round
12	(Spain) C Suárez Navarro	7^{7}	6^{5}	6
(Russia) A Pavlyuchenkova	6^{4}	7^{7}	0
(United Kingdom) H Watson	6	6
7	(Poland) A Radwańska	4	4

Fourth round
12	(Spain) C Suárez Navarro	7^{7}	3	6
(United Kingdom) H Watson	6^{5}	6	1

=== Bottom half ===
==== Section 5 ====
First round
(Slovakia) J Čepelová	3	1
Q	(Czech Republic) L Hradecká	6	6
(Bulgaria) T Pironkova	5	1
Q	(Bulgaria) S Karatantcheva	7	6
(Czech Republic) P Cetkovská	4	5
(United States) C McHale	6	7
(Germany) A Beck	1	3
Q	(Ukraine) L Tsurenko	6	6

Second round
6	(Canada) E Bouchard	6	6
Q	(Czech Republic) L Hradecká	2	2
Q	(Bulgaria) S Karatantcheva	2	3
30	(United States) C Vandeweghe	6	6
20	(France) A Cornet	4	6	6
(United States) C McHale	6	2	1
Q	(Ukraine) L Tsurenko	6	4	6
9	(Germany) A Petkovic	3	6	4

Third round
6	(Canada) E Bouchard	6	6
30	(United States) C Vandeweghe	3	2
20	(France) A Cornet	5	6	2
Q	(Ukraine) L Tsurenko	7	1	6

Fourth round
6	(Canada) E Bouchard	7^{7}	5	4
Q	(Ukraine) L Tsurenko	6^{5}	7	6

==== Section 6 ====
First round
(Slovakia) D Hantuchová	4	6	3
(Czech Republic) K Koukalová	6	1	6
(Slovakia) A Schmiedlová	2	2
(United States) L Davis	6	6
(Serbia) B Jovanovski	6	6
(Netherlands) K Bertens	3	4
(Estonia) K Kanepi	5	2
Q	(Tunisia) O Jabeur	7	6

Second round
16	(United States) M Keys	6	6
(Czech Republic) K Koukalová	3	2
(United States) L Davis	7^{7}	0	4
18	(Serbia) J Janković	6^{5}	6	6
31	(Switzerland) B Bencic	6	7^{7}
(Serbia) B Jovanovski	2	6^{2}
Q	(Tunisia) O Jabeur	6^{3}	4
4	(Denmark) C Wozniacki	7^{7}	6

Third round
16	(United States) M Keys	7	4	3
18	(Serbia) J Janković	5	6	6
31	(Switzerland) B Bencic	6	6
4	(Denmark) C Wozniacki	4	4

Fourth round
18	(Serbia) J Janković	6	3	6
31	(Switzerland) B Bencic	3	6	3

==== Section 7 ====
First round
(Czech Republic) T Smitková	4	4
Q	(Kazakhstan) Y Putintseva	6	6
PR	(Russia) V Zvonareva	1	1
Q	(Slovenia) P Hercog	6	6
(Australia) J Gajdošová	6	1	2
(Italy) R Vinci	4	6	6
Q	(China) L Zhu	0	6	6
(Italy) F Schiavone	6	3	3

Second round
5	(Serbia) A Ivanovic	6	6
Q	(Kazakhstan) Y Putintseva	3	1
Q	(Slovenia) P Hercog	4	7^{7}	4
25	(France) C Garcia	6	6^{5}	6
24	(Germany) S Lisicki	6	5	6
(Italy) R Vinci	1	7	4
Q	(China) L Zhu	0	6	2
11	(Italy) S Errani	6	4	6

Third round
5	(Serbia) A Ivanovic	2	7	2
25	(France) C Garcia	6	5	6
24	(Germany) S Lisicki	6	6
11	(Italy) S Errani	4	2

Fourth round
25	(France) C Garcia	4	4
24	(Germany) S Lisicki	6	6

==== Section 8 ====
First round
(United States) M Brengle	6	6
(China) S Zheng	3	0
WC	(United States) B Mattek-Sands	4	7	5
WC	(United States) T Townsend	6	5	7
(United States) S Rogers	2	4
(Belgium) K Flipkens	6	6
(Italy) K Knapp	1	5
(Belgium) Y Wickmayer	6	7

Second round
15	(Italy) F Pennetta	6	6
(United States) M Brengle	4	2
WC	(United States) T Townsend	4	2
21	(Australia) S Stosur	6	6
32	(Belarus) V Azarenka	6	6
(Belgium) K Flipkens	2	4
(Belgium) Y Wickmayer	1	5
2	(Russia) M Sharapova	6	7

Third round
15	(Italy) F Pennetta	6	6
21	(Australia) S Stosur	4	2
32	(Belarus) V Azarenka	4	3
2	(Russia) M Sharapova	6	6

Fourth round
15	(Italy) F Pennetta	3	6	6
2	(Russia) M Sharapova	6	3	2

== Qualifying ==
=== Seeds ===
1. (Slovenia) Polona Hercog (qualified)
2. (Spain) María Teresa Torró Flor (qualifying competition)
3. (Ukraine) Lesia Tsurenko (qualified)
4. (Czech Republic) Denisa Allertová (first round)
5. (Spain) Lara Arruabarrena (qualified)
6. (Hungary) Tímea Babos (qualifying competition)
7. (Russia) Evgeniya Rodina (qualified)
8. (Croatia) Ana Konjuh (qualifying competition)
9. (Germany) Anna-Lena Friedsam (first round)
10. (Japan) Misaki Doi (first round)
11. (France) Pauline Parmentier (qualifying competition)
12. (Russia) Daria Gavrilova (qualified)
13. (Belgium) An-Sophie Mestach (qualifying competition)
14. (Ukraine) Kateryna Kozlova (qualified)
15. (Turkey) Çağla Büyükakçay (first round)
16. (Germany) Tatjana Maria (first round)
17. (Kazakhstan) Yulia Putintseva (qualified)
18. (Japan) Kimiko Date-Krumm (first round, retired)
19. (Israel) Shahar Pe'er (qualifying competition)
20. (Belgium) Alison Van Uytvanck (qualified)
21. (Portugal) Michelle Larcher de Brito (qualifying competition)
22. (Czech Republic) Lucie Hradecká (qualified)
23. (China) Zhu Lin (qualified)
24. (Netherlands) Richèl Hogenkamp (first round)

=== Qualifiers ===
1. (Slovenia) Polona Hercog
2. (China) Zhu Lin
3. (Ukraine) Lesia Tsurenko
4. (Tunisia) Ons Jabeur
5. (Spain) Lara Arruabarrena
6. (Belgium) Alison Van Uytvanck
7. (Russia) Evgeniya Rodina
8. (Czech Republic) Lucie Hradecká
9. (Kazakhstan) Yulia Putintseva
10. (Ukraine) Kateryna Kozlova
11. (Bulgaria) Sesil Karatantcheva
12. (Russia) Daria Gavrilova

=== Qualifying draw ===
==== First qualifier ====
First round
1	(Slovenia) Polona Hercog	6	7
(United States) Maria Sanchez	3	5
(Czech Republic) Renata Voráčová	4	2
13	(Belgium) An-Sophie Mestach	6	6

Qualifying competition
1	(Slovenia) Polona Hercog	6	6
13	(Belgium) An-Sophie Mestach	4	2

==== Second qualifier ====
First round
2	(Spain) María Teresa Torró Flor	6	6
(United States) Samantha Crawford	0	3
(Poland) Paula Kania	5	5
23	(China) Zhu Lin	7	7

Qualifying competition
2	(Spain) María Teresa Torró Flor	6	4	3
23	(China) Zhu Lin	2	6	6

==== Third qualifier ====
First round
3	(Ukraine) Lesia Tsurenko	6	6
(Japan) Mayo Hibi	2	3
WC	(United States) Jessica Pegula	0	2
19	(Israel) Shahar Pe'er	6	6

Qualifying competition
3	(Ukraine) Lesia Tsurenko	6^{4}	6	6
19	(Israel) Shahar Pe'er	7^{7}	4	2

==== Fourth qualifier ====
First round
4	(Czech Republic) Denisa Allertová	4	7	2
(Tunisia) Ons Jabeur	6	5	6
(United States) Julia Boserup	7	7^{8}
24	(Netherlands) Richèl Hogenkamp	5	6^{6}

Qualifying competition
(Tunisia) Ons Jabeur	6	6
(United States) Julia Boserup	2	3

==== Fifth qualifier ====
First round
5	(Spain) Lara Arruabarrena	1	6	6
(Czech Republic) Andrea Hlaváčková	6	3	3
(Colombia) Mariana Duque Mariño	6	3	6
16	(Germany) Tatjana Maria	4	6	4

Qualifying competition
5	(Spain) Lara Arruabarrena	3	6	6
(Colombia) Mariana Duque Mariño	6	2	3

==== Sixth qualifier ====
First round
6	(Hungary) Tímea Babos	6	6
WC	(United States) Allie Kiick	3	2
(Ukraine) Olga Savchuk	6^{4}	0
20	(Belgium) Alison Van Uytvanck	7^{7}	6

Qualifying competition
6	(Hungary) Tímea Babos	4	2
20	(Belgium) Alison Van Uytvanck	6	6

==== Seventh qualifier ====
First round
7	(Russia) Evgeniya Rodina	3	7^{7}	6
(Canada) Gabriela Dabrowski	6	6^{4}	4
(Argentina) Paula Ormaechea	6^{3}	2
21	(Portugal) Michelle Larcher de Brito	7^{7}	6

Qualifying competition
7	(Russia) Evgeniya Rodina	2	6	6
21	(Portugal) Michelle Larcher de Brito	6	3	4

==== Eighth qualifier ====
First round
8	(Croatia) Ana Konjuh	6	7^{11}
(Poland) Urszula Radwańska	4	6^{9}
(Russia) Alexandra Panova	4	6	4
22	(Czech Republic) Lucie Hradecká	6	2	6

Qualifying competition
8	(Croatia) Ana Konjuh	4	2
22	(Czech Republic) Lucie Hradecká	6	6

==== Ninth qualifier ====
First round
9	(Germany) Anna-Lena Friedsam	4	4
(Australia) Anastasia Rodionova	6	6
(Romania) Edina Gallovits-Hall	7	2	5
17	(Kazakhstan) Yulia Putintseva	5	6	7

Qualifying competition
(Australia) Anastasia Rodionova	0	4
17	(Kazakhstan) Yulia Putintseva	6	6

==== Tenth qualifier ====
First round
10	(Japan) Misaki Doi	4	2
(United Kingdom) Johanna Konta	6	6
(Serbia) Jovana Jakšić	2	0
14	(Ukraine) Kateryna Kozlova	6	6

Qualifying competition
(United Kingdom) Johanna Konta	1	6	3
14	(Ukraine) Kateryna Kozlova	6	3	6

==== Eleventh qualifier ====
First round
11	(France) Pauline Parmentier	6	6
(Japan) Shuko Aoyama	4	1
(Bulgaria) Sesil Karatantcheva	6	6
15	(Turkey) Çağla Büyükakçay	3	4

Qualifying competition
11	(France) Pauline Parmentier	6	5	2
(Bulgaria) Sesil Karatantcheva	4	7	6

==== Twelfth qualifier ====
First round
12	(Russia) Daria Gavrilova	6	3	6
(Australia) Arina Rodionova	3	6	2
WC	(United States) Lauren Embree	6	5
18	(Japan) Kimiko Date-Krumm	2	2^{r}

Qualifying competition
12	(Russia) Daria Gavrilova	6^{4}	6	7
WC	(United States) Lauren Embree	7^{7}	4	5
