= 2001 Indian Wells Open =

- Date: March 8–18
- Edition: 28th
- Category: Masters Series (ATP); Tier I Series (WTA)
- Prize money: $2,450,000
- Surface: Hard / outdoor
- Location: Tennis Indian Wells, CA, US
- Venue: Indian Wells Tennis Garden

Champions

Men's singles
- (United States) Andre Agassi

Women's singles
- (United States) Serena Williams

Men's doubles
- (South Africa) Wayne Ferreira / (Russia) Yevgeny Kafelnikov

Women's doubles
- (United States) Nicole Arendt / (Japan) Ai Sugiyama
← 2000 ·	Indian Wells Open	· 2002 →

The 2001 Indian Wells Open was a tennis tournament played on outdoor hard courts. It was the 28th edition of the Indian Wells Open and was part of the Tennis Masters Series of the 2001 ATP Tour and of Tier I of the 2001 WTA Tour. Both the men's and women's events took place at the Indian Wells Tennis Garden in Indian Wells, California in the United States from March 8 through March 18, 2001.

== Finals ==
=== Men's singles ===
(United States) Andre Agassi defeated (United States) Pete Sampras 7–6, 7–5, 6–1

- It was Agassi's 2nd title of the year and the 48th of his career. It was his 1st Masters title of the year and his 11th overall.

=== Women's singles ===
(United States) Serena Williams defeated (Belgium) Kim Clijsters 4–6, 6–4, 6–2

- It was Williams' 2nd title of the year and the 19th of her career. It was her 1st Tier I title of the year and her 2nd overall.

=== Men's doubles ===
(South Africa) Wayne Ferreira / (Russia) Yevgeny Kafelnikov defeated (Sweden) Jonas Björkman / (Australia) Todd Woodbridge 6–2, 7–5

- It was Ferreira's 1st title of the year and the 23rd of his career. It was Kafelnikov's 2nd title of the year and the 45th of his career.

=== Women's doubles ===
(United States) Nicole Arendt / (Japan) Ai Sugiyama defeated (Spain) Virginia Ruano Pascual / (Argentina) Paola Suárez 6–4, 6–4

- It was Arendt's 2nd title of the year and the 15th of her career. It was Sugiyama's 2nd title of the year and the 23rd of her career.

== See also ==
- 2001 Indian Wells controversy
