= 2001 Indian Wells Open – Men's doubles =

Men's doubles
- 2001 Indian Wells Open

Final
- Champions: (South Africa) Wayne Ferreira (Russia) Yevgeny Kafelnikov
- Runners-up: (Sweden) Jonas Björkman (Australia) Todd Woodbridge
- Score: 6–2, 7–5

Details
- Draw: 32 (6WC/2Q)
- Seeds: 8

Events
Singles	men	women
Doubles	men	women
← 2000 ·	Indian Wells Open	· 2002 →

Alex O'Brien and Jared Palmer were the defending champions but they competed with different partners that year, O'Brien with Sébastien Lareau and Palmer with Byron Black.

Lareau and O'Brien lost in the second round to Mark Knowles and Brian MacPhie.

Black and Palmer lost in the quarterfinals to Jonas Björkman and Todd Woodbridge.

Wayne Ferreira and Yevgeny Kafelnikov won in the final 6–2, 7–5 against Björkman and Woodbridge.

== Seeds ==
1. (Sweden) Jonas Björkman / (Australia) Todd Woodbridge (final)
2. (Canada) Daniel Nestor / (Australia) Sandon Stolle (first round)
3. (South Africa) Wayne Ferreira / (Russia) Yevgeny Kafelnikov (champions)
4. (Czech Republic) Jiří Novák / (Czech Republic) David Rikl (first round)
5. (Netherlands) Paul Haarhuis / (Germany) David Prinosil (second round)
6. (Canada) Sébastien Lareau / (United States) Alex O'Brien (second round)
7. (United States) Donald Johnson / (United States) Rick Leach (first round)
8. (Zimbabwe) Byron Black / (United States) Jared Palmer (quarterfinals)

== Draw ==
=== Key ===
- Q = Qualifier
- WC = Wild card
- LL = Lucky loser
- Alt = Alternate
- SE = Special exempt
- PR = Protected ranking
- ITF = ITF entry
- JE = Junior exempt
- w/o = Walkover
- r = Retired
- d = Defaulted
- SR = Special ranking

=== Final ===
Semifinals
1	(Sweden) Jonas Björkman (Australia) Todd Woodbridge	6	7^{8}
(The Bahamas) Mark Knowles (United States) Brian MacPhie	3	6^{6}
3	(South Africa) Wayne Ferreira (Russia) Yevgeny Kafelnikov	6	7
(Australia) Joshua Eagle (Australia) Andrew Florent	3	5

Final
1	(Sweden) Jonas Björkman (Australia) Todd Woodbridge	2	5
3	(South Africa) Wayne Ferreira (Russia) Yevgeny Kafelnikov	6	7

=== Top half ===
First round
1	(Sweden) J Björkman (Australia) T Woodbridge	7^{7}	7^{7}
(Zimbabwe) W Black (Zimbabwe) K Ullyett	6^{3}	6^{3}
(United States) B Bryan (United States) M Bryan	7^{7}	1	3
(Australia) W Arthurs (Federal Republic of Yugoslavia) N Zimonjić	6^{4}	6	6
(Belarus) M Mirnyi (United States) J Stark	4	6	3
Q	(Spain) À Corretja (Spain) A Costa	6	3	6
(South Africa) D Adams (Argentina) M García	3	4
8	(Zimbabwe) B Black (United States) J Palmer	6	6
4	(Czech Republic) J Novák (Czech Republic) D Rikl	1	7^{7}	5
(Argentina) L Arnold (Argentina) G Etlis	6	6^{5}	7
(Argentina) P Albano (Australia) D Macpherson	6	7
(South Africa) J-L de Jager (South Africa) E Ferreira	1	5
(South Africa) C Haggard (Belgium) T Vanhoudt	2	6	4
(The Bahamas) M Knowles (United States) B MacPhie	6	4	6
WC	(India) M Bhupathi (India) L Paes	4	4
6	(Canada) S Lareau (United States) A O'Brien	6	6

Second round
1	(Sweden) J Björkman (Australia) T Woodbridge	6	6
(Australia) W Arthurs (Federal Republic of Yugoslavia) N Zimonjić	3	4
Q	(Spain) À Corretja (Spain) A Costa	3	2
8	(Zimbabwe) B Black (United States) J Palmer	6	6
(Argentina) L Arnold (Argentina) G Etlis	3	7	2
(Argentina) P Albano (Australia) D Macpherson	6	5	6
(The Bahamas) M Knowles (United States) B MacPhie	6	6
6	(Canada) S Lareau (United States) A O'Brien	4	1

Quarterfinals
1	(Sweden) J Björkman (Australia) T Woodbridge	6	6
8	(Zimbabwe) B Black (United States) J Palmer	4	2
(Argentina) P Albano (Australia) D Macpherson	6	3	4
(The Bahamas) M Knowles (United States) B MacPhie	4	6	6

Semifinals
1	(Sweden) J Björkman (Australia) T Woodbridge	6	7^{8}
(The Bahamas) M Knowles (United States) B MacPhie	3	6^{6}

=== Bottom half ===
First round
5	(Netherlands) P Haarhuis (Germany) D Prinosil	6	6^{2}	6
WC	(Germany) T Haas (Germany) N Kiefer	0	7^{7}	4
(Australia) M Hill (United States) J Tarango	6	6
Q	(United States) P Goldstein (United States) J Thomas	3	3
WC	(Ecuador) N Lapentti (Spain) C Moyá	5	6	6
(Argentina) D Orsanic (Czech Republic) C Suk	7	4	4
WC	(United States) J Blake (United States) M Fish	6^{4}	6	4
3	(South Africa) W Ferreira (Russia) Y Kafelnikov	7^{7}	4	6
7	(United States) D Johnson (United States) R Leach	6^{5}	4
WC	(Australia) L Hewitt (Australia) P Rafter	7^{7}	6
WC	(Netherlands) R Krajicek (Netherlands) S Schalken	3	4
(Switzerland) R Federer (Slovakia) D Hrbatý	6	6
(Czech Republic) P Pála (Czech Republic) P Vízner	6	3	7
(United States) J Gimelstob (United States) S Humphries	3	6	5
(Australia) J Eagle (Australia) A Florent	6	6
2	(Canada) D Nestor (Australia) S Stolle	3	3

Second round
5	(Netherlands) P Haarhuis (Germany) D Prinosil	5	3
(Australia) M Hill (United States) J Tarango	7	6
WC	(Ecuador) N Lapentti (Spain) C Moyá	4	6	3
3	(South Africa) W Ferreira (Russia) Y Kafelnikov	6	4	6
WC	(Australia) L Hewitt (Australia) P Rafter	6	6
(Switzerland) R Federer (Slovakia) D Hrbatý	3	4
(Czech Republic) P Pála (Czech Republic) P Vízner	7	3	2
(Australia) J Eagle (Australia) A Florent	5	6	6

Quarterfinals
(Australia) M Hill (United States) J Tarango	4	7^{7}	4
3	(South Africa) W Ferreira (Russia) Y Kafelnikov	6	6^{2}	6
WC	(Australia) L Hewitt (Australia) P Rafter	4	6^{2}
(Australia) J Eagle (Australia) A Florent	6	7^{7}

Semifinals
3	(South Africa) W Ferreira (Russia) Y Kafelnikov	6	7
(Australia) J Eagle (Australia) A Florent	3	5

== Qualifying ==
=== Qualifying seeds ===
1. (Czech Republic) Tomáš Cibulec / (Czech Republic) Leoš Friedl (first round)
2. (France) Julien Boutter / (France) Fabrice Santoro (first round)
3. (Sweden) Simon Aspelin / (Sweden) Johan Landsberg (qualifying competition)
4. (South Africa) Marius Barnard / (Australia) Andrew Kratzmann (qualifying competition)

=== Qualifiers ===
1. (Spain) Àlex Corretja / (Spain) Albert Costa
2. (United States) Paul Goldstein / (United States) Jim Thomas

=== Qualifying draw ===
==== First qualifier ====
First round
1	(Czech Republic) Tomáš Cibulec (Czech Republic) Leoš Friedl	4	1
WC	(Spain) Àlex Corretja (Spain) Albert Costa	6	6
WC	(France) Arnaud Clément (France) Sébastien Grosjean	4	6^{3}
4	(South Africa) Marius Barnard (Australia) Andrew Kratzmann	6	7^{7}

Qualifying competition
WC	(Spain) Àlex Corretja (Spain) Albert Costa	6	7^{8}
4	(South Africa) Marius Barnard (Australia) Andrew Kratzmann	3	6^{6}

==== Second qualifier ====
First round
2	(France) Julien Boutter (France) Fabrice Santoro	6^{5}	2
WC	(United States) Paul Goldstein (United States) Jim Thomas	7^{7}	6
(South Africa) Brent Haygarth (Israel) Eyal Ran	6^{4}	3
3	(Sweden) Simon Aspelin (Sweden) Johan Landsberg	7^{7}	6

Qualifying competition
WC	(United States) Paul Goldstein (United States) Jim Thomas	6	6
3	(Sweden) Simon Aspelin (Sweden) Johan Landsberg	1	2
