= 2002 Pacific Life Open =

- Date: March 6–17
- Edition: 29th
- Category: Tennis Masters Series (ATP); Tier I Series (WTA)
- Prize money: $2,450,000
- Surface: Hard / outdoor
- Location: Indian Wells, CA, U.S.
- Venue: Indian Wells Tennis Garden

Champions

Men's singles
- (Australia) Lleyton Hewitt

Women's singles
- (Slovakia) Daniela Hantuchová

Men's doubles
- (The Bahamas) Mark Knowles / (Canada) Daniel Nestor

Women's doubles
- (United States) Lisa Raymond / (Australia) Rennae Stubbs
← 2001 ·	Indian Wells Open	· 2003 →

The 2002 Pacific Life Open was a tennis tournament played on outdoor hard courts. It was the 29th edition of the Indian Wells Open and was part of the Tennis Masters Series of the 2002 ATP Tour and of Tier I of the 2002 WTA Tour. Both the men's and women's events took place at the Indian Wells Tennis Garden in Indian Wells, California in the United States from March 6 through March 17, 2002.

== Finals ==
=== Men's singles ===
(Australia) Lleyton Hewitt defeated (United Kingdom) Tim Henman 6–1, 6–2

- It was Hewitt's 2nd singles title of the year and the 14th of his career. It was his 1st Masters title.

=== Women's singles ===
(Slovakia) Daniela Hantuchová defeated (Switzerland) Martina Hingis 6–3, 6–4

- It was Hantuchová's 1st title career title. Hantuchová was the lowest-ranked player ever to win the title.

=== Men's doubles ===
(The Bahamas) Mark Knowles / (Canada) Daniel Nestor defeated (Switzerland) Roger Federer / (Belarus) Max Mirnyi 6–4, 6–4

- It was Knowles' 3rd title of the year and the 20th of his career. It was Nestor's 3rd title of the year and the 23rd of his career.

=== Women's doubles ===
(United States) Lisa Raymond / (Australia) Rennae Stubbs defeated (Russia) Elena Dementieva / (Slovakia) Janette Husárová 7–5, 6–0

- It was Raymond's 5th title of the year and the 35th of her career. It was Stubbs' 4th title of the year and the 37th of her career.
