= 2001 Indian Wells Open – Women's doubles =

Women's doubles
- 2001 Indian Wells Open

Final
- Champions: (United States) Nicole Arendt (Japan) Ai Sugiyama
- Runners-up: (Spain) Virginia Ruano Pascual (Argentina) Paola Suárez
- Score: 6–4, 6–4

Details
- Draw: 32 (2WC/1Q/1LL)
- Seeds: 9

Events
Singles	men	women
Doubles	men	women
- Indian Wells Open

Lindsay Davenport and Corina Morariu were the defending champions but lost in the quarterfinals to Virginia Ruano Pascual and Paola Suárez.

Nicole Arendt and Ai Sugiyama won in the final 6–4, 6–4 against Ruano Pascual and Suárez.

== Seeds ==
Champion seeds are indicated in bold text, while text in italics indicates the round in which those seeds were eliminated.

1. (United States) **Nicole Arendt** / (Japan) **Ai Sugiyama (champions)**
2. (Spain) Virginia Ruano Pascual / (Argentina) Paola Suárez (final)
3. (Spain) Arantxa Sánchez-Vicario / (France) Nathalie Tauziat (semifinals)
4. (United States) ~~Serena Williams~~ / (United States) ~~Venus Williams~~ (withdrew)
5. (United States) Lisa Raymond / (France) Sandrine Testud (semifinals)
6. (United States) Lindsay Davenport / (United States) Corina Morariu (quarterfinals)
7. (Zimbabwe) Cara Black / (Russia) Elena Likhovtseva (second round)
8. (Germany) Anke Huber / (Austria) Barbara Schett (quarterfinals)
9. (Belgium) Els Callens / (United States) Meghann Shaughnessy (quarterfinals)

== Draw ==
Key

- Q = Qualifier
- WC = Wild card
- LL = Lucky loser
- Alt = Alternate
- ITF = ITF entry
- PR = Protected ranking
- SR = Special ranking
- SE = Special exempt
- JE = Junior exempt
- JR = Junior Accelerator Programme entrant
- CO = College Accelerator Programme entrant
- NG = Next Gen Accelerator Program entrant
- w/o = Walkover
- r = Retired
- d = Defaulted

=== Final ===
Final
1	(United States) **Nicole Arendt** (Japan) **Ai Sugiyama**	**6**	**6**
2	(Spain) Virginia Ruano Pascual (Argentina) Paola Suárez	4	4

=== Top half ===
First round
1	(United States) **N Arendt** (Japan) **A Sugiyama**	**6**	**6**
Q	(Japan) R Hiraki (Japan) Y Yoshida	1	2
(United States) **A Frazier** (United States) **K Schlukebir**	**7^{7}**	4	**6**
(South Africa) M de Swardt (United States) D Graham	6^{4}	**6**	2
(France) **É Loit** (France) **A-G Sidot**	**7**	**6**
(Croatia) I Majoli (Spain) C Martínez	5	4
LL	(Czech Republic) K Hrdličková (Germany) B Rittner	4	2
7	(Zimbabwe) **C Black** (Russia) **E Likhovtseva**	**6**	**6**
3	(Spain) **A Sánchez-Vicario** (France) **N Tauziat**	**7**	**7^{7}**
(Romania) R Dragomir (Italy) S Farina Elia	5	6^{3}
(South Africa) **L Horn** (Argentina) **L Montalvo**	**7^{7}**	4	**6**
(Sweden) Å Carlsson (Bulgaria) M Maleeva	6^{4}	**6**	2
WC	(United States) **L Osterloh** (United States) **A Stevenson**	0	**6**	**6**
(Switzerland) P Schnyder (Spain) M Serna	**6**	3	1
(Bulgaria) L Bacheva (Spain) C Torrens Valero	5	**6**	4
8	(Germany) **A Huber** (Austria) **B Schett**	**7**	4	**6**

Second round
1	(United States) **N Arendt** (Japan) **A Sugiyama**	5	**7^{7}**	**7^{7}**
(United States) A Frazier (United States) K Schlukebir	**7**	6^{3}	6^{5}
(France) **É Loit** (France) **A-G Sidot**	**6**	5	**7**
7	(Zimbabwe) C Black (Russia) E Likhovtseva	4	**7**	5
3	(Spain) **A Sánchez-Vicario** (France) **N Tauziat**	4	**6**	**6**
(South Africa) L Horn (Argentina) L Montalvo	**6**	4	2
WC	(United States) L Osterloh (United States) A Stevenson	2	5
8	(Germany) **A Huber** (Austria) **B Schett**	**6**	**7**

Quarterfinals
1	(United States) **N Arendt** (Japan) **A Sugiyama**	4	**6**	**7**
(France) É Loit (France) A-G Sidot	**6**	1	5
3	(Spain) **A Sánchez-Vicario** (France) **N Tauziat**	**6**	**6**
8	(Germany) A Huber (Austria) B Schett	2	4

Semifinals
1	(United States) **N Arendt** (Japan) **A Sugiyama**	**6**	**6**
3	(Spain) A Sánchez-Vicario (France) N Tauziat	3	4

=== Bottom half ===
First round
5	(United States) **L Raymond** (France) **S Testud**	**6**	**7**
(France) A Fusai (Italy) R Grande	1	5
(Slovenia) **T Križan** (Slovenia) **K Srebotnik**	**6**	**6**
(Germany) A Glass (Argentina) P Tarabini	3	1
(Italy) **T Garbin** (Slovakia) **J Husárová**	2	**6**	**6**
(Belgium) K Clijsters (Belgium) L Courtois	**6**	4	4
(Netherlands) M Oremans (Kazakhstan) I Selyutina	0	**6**	3
9	(Belgium) **E Callens** (United States) **M Shaughnessy**	**6**	4	**6**
6	(United States) **L Davenport** (United States) **C Morariu**	**6**	**6**
(Uzbekistan) I Tulyaganova (Netherlands) C Vis	1	4
(Australia) **R McQuillan** (Australia) **L McShea**	6^{3}	**6**	**6**
(Italy) G Casoni (Federal Republic of Yugoslavia) S Načuk	**7^{7}**	2	1
(United States) **K Po** (Australia) **N Pratt**	**6**	**7**
WC	(Spain) M Marrero (Spain) M Sánchez Lorenzo	0	5
(United States) E deLone (Canada) S Jeyaseelan	3	**6**	1
2	(Spain) **V Ruano Pascual** (Argentina) **P Suárez**	**6**	2	**6**

Second round
5	(United States) **L Raymond** (France) **S Testud**	**6**	**7^{7}**
(Slovenia) T Križan (Slovenia) K Srebotnik	2	6^{2}
(Italy) T Garbin (Slovakia) J Husárová	3	**7^{7}**	2
9	(Belgium) **E Callens** (United States) **M Shaughnessy**	**6**	6^{4}	**6**
6	(United States) **L Davenport** (United States) **C Morariu**	**6**	**6**
(Australia) R McQuillan (Australia) L McShea	2	3
(United States) K Po (Australia) N Pratt	**6**	5	6^{5}
2	(Spain) **V Ruano Pascual** (Argentina) **P Suárez**	2	**7**	**7^{7}**

Quarterfinals
5	(United States) **L Raymond** (France) **S Testud**	**6**	**6**
9	(Belgium) E Callens (United States) M Shaughnessy	1	4
6	(United States) L Davenport (United States) C Morariu	5	**6**	5
2	(Spain) **V Ruano Pascual** (Argentina) **P Suárez**	**7**	3	**7**

Semifinals
5	(United States) L Raymond (France) S Testud	**6**	5	3
2	(Spain) **V Ruano Pascual** (Argentina) **P Suárez**	3	**7**	**6**

== Qualifying ==
=== Qualifying seeds ===
1. (United States) Janet Lee / (Indonesia) Wynne Prakusya (second round)
2. (Russia) Alina Jidkova / (Belarus) Tatiana Poutchek (first round)

=== Qualifiers ===
1. **(Japan) Rika Hiraki / (Japan) Yuka Yoshida**

=== Lucky losers ===
1. **(Czech Republic) Květa Hrdličková / (Germany) Barbara Rittner**

=== Qualifying draw ===
First round
1	**(United States) Janet Lee** **(Indonesia) Wynne Prakusya**	**8**
(Germany) Bianka Lamade (Austria) Sylvia Plischke	3
**(Czech Republic) Květa Hrdličková** **(Germany) Barbara Rittner**	**8**
WC	(Argentina) Gisela Dulko (Federal Republic of Yugoslavia) Jelena Janković	4
2	(Russia) Alina Jidkova (Belarus) Tatiana Poutchek	3
**(Japan) Rika Hiraki** **(Japan) Yuka Yoshida**	**8**
(Hungary) Petra Mandula (Austria) Patricia Wartusch	6
**(South Africa) Kim Grant** **(Australia) Alicia Molik**	**8**

Second round
1	(United States) Janet Lee (Indonesia) Wynne Prakusya	3
**(Czech Republic) Květa Hrdličková** **(Germany) Barbara Rittner**	**8**
**(Japan) Rika Hiraki** **(Japan) Yuka Yoshida**	**8**
(South Africa) Kim Grant (Australia) Alicia Molik	3

Qualifying competition
(Czech Republic) Květa Hrdličková (Germany) Barbara Rittner	1	3
**(Japan) Rika Hiraki** **(Japan) Yuka Yoshida**	**6**	**6**
