= Petra Dizdar =

Croatian tennis player (born 1984)

- Country (sports): Croatia
- Born: 30 June 1984 (age 40)
- Height: 5 ft 9 in (175 cm)
- Plays: Right-handed
- Prize money: $10,284

Singles
- Career record: 34–40
- Highest ranking: No. 454 (4 Aug 2003)

Doubles
- Career record: 22–25
- Career titles: 1 ITF
- Highest ranking: No. 520 (23 Jul 2001)

Petra Dizdar (born 30 June 1984) is a Croatian former professional tennis player.

Dizdar, a native of Split, qualified for her only WTA Tour singles main draw at the 2003 Croatian Bol Ladies Open and fell in the first round to the third-seeded Vera Zvonareva. She played collegiate tennis for the University of Texas, where she was named Big 12 Freshman of the Year in 2004 and earned All-Big 12 selection three times as a singles player.

== ITF finals ==
=== Singles: 1 (0–1) ===
Outcome	W–L	Date	Tournament	Surface	Opponent	Score
Runner-up	0–1	Oct 2001	ITF Makarska, Croatia	Clay	(Croatia) Jelena Pandžić	1–6, 7–5, 6–1

=== Doubles: 3 (1–2) ===
Outcome	W–L	Date	Tournament	Surface	Partner	Opponents	Score
Winner	1–0	Sep 2000	ITF Zadar, Croatia	Clay	(Croatia) Mia Marović	(Croatia) Ivana Višić (Croatia) Marijana Kovačević	6–2, 6–3
Runner-up	1–1	Jul 2001	ITF Camaiore, Italy	Clay	(Croatia) Mia Marović	(Argentina) Melisa Arévalo (South Africa) Nicole Rencken	4–5 ret.
Runner-up	1–2	Jul 2003	ITF Ancona, Italy	Clay	(Croatia) Matea Mezak	(Argentina) María José Argeri (Italy) Giulia Meruzzi	3–6, 3–6
