= 2001 Indian Wells Open – Men's singles =

Men's singles
- 2001 Indian Wells Open

Final
- Champion: (United States) Andre Agassi
- Runner-up: (United States) Pete Sampras
- Score: 7–6^{(7–5)}, 7–5, 6–1

Details
- Draw: 64 (4WC/8Q)
- Seeds: 16

Events
Singles	men	women
Doubles	men	women
- Indian Wells Open

Andre Agassi defeated Pete Sampras in the final, 7–6^{(7–5)}, 7–5, 6–1 to win the men's singles tennis title at the 2001 Indian Wells Masters.

Àlex Corretja was the defending champion, but lost in the third round to Patrick Rafter.

== Seeds ==
1. (Brazil) Gustavo Kuerten (third round)
2. (Russia) Marat Safin (first round)
3. (United States) Pete Sampras (final)
4. (United States) Andre Agassi (champion)
5. (Sweden) Magnus Norman (first round)
6. (Australia) Lleyton Hewitt (semifinals)
7. (Russia) Yevgeny Kafelnikov (semifinals)
8. (Spain) Àlex Corretja (third round)
9. (Sweden) Thomas Enqvist (second round)
10. (United Kingdom) Tim Henman (third round)
11. (Australia) Patrick Rafter (quarterfinals)
12. (Spain) Juan Carlos Ferrero (first round)
13. (France) Arnaud Clément (third round)
14. (Slovakia) Dominik Hrbatý (first round)
15. (Australia) Mark Philippoussis (first round)
16. (France) Sébastien Grosjean (third round)

== Draw ==
Key

- Q = Qualifier
- WC = Wild card
- LL = Lucky loser
- Alt = Alternate
- ITF = ITF entry
- PR = Protected ranking
- SR = Special ranking
- SE = Special exempt
- JE = Junior exempt
- JR = Junior Accelerator Programme entrant
- CO = College Accelerator Programme entrant
- NG = Next Gen Accelerator Program entrant
- w/o = Walkover
- r = Retired
- d = Defaulted

=== Finals ===
Quarterfinals
(United States) Jan-Michael Gambill	4	3
7	(Russia) Yevgeny Kafelnikov	6	6
3	(United States) Pete Sampras	4	7^{7}	6
11	(Australia) Patrick Rafter	6	6^{4}	4
(Ecuador) Nicolás Lapentti	1	2
4	(United States) Andre Agassi	6	6
6	(Australia) Lleyton Hewitt	6	6
(France) Nicolas Escudé	1	3

Semifinals
7	(Russia) Yevgeny Kafelnikov	5	4
3	(United States) Pete Sampras	7	6
4	(United States) Andre Agassi	6	3	6
6	(Australia) Lleyton Hewitt	4	6	4

Final
3	(United States) Pete Sampras	6^{5}	5	1
4	(United States) Andre Agassi	7^{7}	7	6

=== Top half ===
==== Section 1 ====
First round
1	(Brazil) G Kuerten	6	6
Q	(United States) C Mamiit	2	3
(South Africa) W Ferreira	3	0
WC	(United States) T Dent	6	6
(Spain) F Vicente	6	6
WC	(United States) C Woodruff	2	3
(United States) J-M Gambill	6	6
14	(Slovakia) D Hrbatý	4	3
9	(Sweden) T Enqvist	7^{7}	2	6
(Switzerland) M Rosset	6^{0}	6	4
(Spain) Á Calatrava	1	7^{7}	2
WC	(Croatia) G Ivanišević	6	6^{3}	6
(Austria) S Koubek	0	2
(Spain) F Clavet	6	6
(Chile) M Ríos	4	5
7	(Russia) Y Kafelnikov	6	7

Second round
1	(Brazil) G Kuerten	6	6^{5}	6
WC	(United States) T Dent	4	7^{7}	2
(Spain) F Vicente	3	2
(United States) J-M Gambill	6	6
9	(Sweden) T Enqvist	6^{1}	3
WC	(Croatia) G Ivanišević	7^{7}	6
(Spain) F Clavet	3	6^{6}
7	(Russia) Y Kafelnikov	6	7^{8}

Third round
1	(Brazil) G Kuerten	6^{5}	4
(United States) J-M Gambill	7^{7}	6
WC	(Croatia) G Ivanišević	7	2	3
7	(Russia) Y Kafelnikov	5	6	6

Quarterfinals
(United States) J-M Gambill	4	3
7	(Russia) Y Kafelnikov	6	6

==== Section 2 ====
First round
3	(United States) P Sampras	6	6
(Germany) D Prinosil	4	4
(France) F Santoro	6	6
Q	(Italy) A Gaudenzi	0	3
(United States) M Chang	4	4
(Spain) C Moyà	6	6
(Zimbabwe) B Black	0	2
16	(France) S Grosjean	6	6
11	(Australia) P Rafter	6	6
(United Kingdom) G Rusedski	3	2
Q	(France) A di Pasquale	6	7^{8}
(Belarus) V Voltchkov	1	6^{6}
(Netherlands) S Schalken	4	7^{7}	6
Q	(Argentina) J I Chela	6	6^{5}	3
(Argentina) G Gaudio	6	6^{2}	6^{4}
8	(Spain) À Corretja	3	7^{7}	7^{7}

Second round
3	(United States) P Sampras	6	3	6
(France) F Santoro	3	6	0
(Spain) C Moyà	3	6	6^{3}
16	(France) S Grosjean	6	4	7^{7}
11	(Australia) P Rafter	6	6
Q	(France) A di Pasquale	2	2
(Netherlands) S Schalken	4	6^{2}
8	(Spain) À Corretja	6	7^{7}

Third round
3	(United States) P Sampras	6	7^{9}
16	(France) S Grosjean	1	6^{7}
11	(Australia) P Rafter	4	6	6
8	(Spain) À Corretja	6	3	4

Quarterfinals
3	(United States) P Sampras	4	7^{7}	6
11	(Australia) P Rafter	6	6^{4}	4

=== Bottom half ===
==== Section 3 ====
First round
5	(Sweden) M Norman	6	1	1
(Ecuador) N Lapentti	4	6	6
(Sweden) J Björkman	7^{7}	6
(Morocco) Y El Aynaoui	6^{5}	2
(France) C Pioline	7^{7}	6
(Belarus) M Mirnyi	6^{2}	3
(Germany) R Schüttler	2	7	6^{4}
10	(United Kingdom) T Henman	6	5	7^{7}
15	(Australia) M Philippoussis	4	7^{7}	4
WC	(United States) M Fish	6	6^{2}	6
(Switzerland) R Federer	6	5	1
(Germany) N Kiefer	3	7	6
Q	(Italy) D Sanguinetti	3	6	5
(Germany) T Haas	6	1	7
(Morocco) H Arazi	3	2
4	(United States) A Agassi	6	6

Second round
(Ecuador) N Lapentti	6	6
(Sweden) J Björkman	3	2
(France) C Pioline	3	3
10	(United Kingdom) T Henman	6	6
WC	(United States) M Fish	4	1
(Germany) N Kiefer	6	6
(Germany) T Haas	6^{5}	3
4	(United States) A Agassi	7^{7}	6

Third round
(Ecuador) N Lapentti	6	6
10	(United Kingdom) T Henman	4	4
(Germany) N Kiefer	4	7	4
4	(United States) A Agassi	6	5	6

Quarterfinals
(Ecuador) N Lapentti	1	2
4	(United States) A Agassi	6	6

==== Section 4 ====
First round
6	(Australia) L Hewitt	6	5	6
(Spain) Á Costa	2	7	1
(Romania) A Pavel	6	1	4
Q	(Thailand) P Srichaphan	2	6	6
(Argentina) F Squillari	5	0
(Czech Republic) B Ulihrach	7	6
Q	(Chile) N Massú	7^{7}	6^{4}	7^{8}
12	(Spain) J C Ferrero	6^{3}	7^{7}	6^{6}
13	(France) A Clément	6	6
(Australia) A Ilie	0	3
Q	(United States) J Tarango	2	0
(Italy) G Pozzi	6	6
(Sweden) A Vinciguerra	6^{7}	5
(France) N Escudé	7^{9}	7
(Sweden) T Johansson	7	7
2	(Russia) M Safin	5	5

Second round
6	(Australia) L Hewitt	6	6
Q	(Thailand) P Srichaphan	3	3
(Czech Republic) B Ulihrach	6	5
Q	(Chile) N Massú	2	0	r
13	(France) A Clément	6	6
(Italy) G Pozzi	3	4
(France) N Escudé	6	6^{5}	7
(Sweden) T Johansson	1	7^{7}	5

Third round
6	(Australia) L Hewitt	6	6
(Czech Republic) B Ulihrach	2	4
13	(France) A Clément	1	2
(France) N Escudé	6	6

Quarterfinals
6	(Australia) L Hewitt	6	6
(France) N Escudé	1	3
