= Tina Pisnik =

Slovenian tennis player (born 1981)

- Country (sports): Slovenia
- Residence: Maribor, Slovenia
- Born: 19 February 1981 (age 45) Maribor, Yugoslavia
- Height: 1.72 m (5 ft 7 1/2 in)
- Turned pro: 1999
- Retired: 2005
- Plays: Right (two-handed backhand)
- Prize money: $931,077

Singles
- Career record: 185–172
- Career titles: 1 WTA, 1 ITF
- Highest ranking: No. 29 (12 January 2004)

Grand Slam singles results
- Australian Open: 2R (2001, 2002)
- French Open: 3R (2003)
- Wimbledon: 3R (2000)
- US Open: 3R (2003)

Doubles
- Career record: 60–65
- Career titles: 2 WTA, 3 ITF
- Highest ranking: No. 63 (3 April 2000)

Grand Slam doubles results
- Australian Open: 1R (2000, 2001, 2002)
- French Open: 1R (2000, 2001, 2002)
- Wimbledon: 3R (1999, 2001)
- US Open: 1R (1999, 2000, 2001)

Tina Pisnik (born 19 February 1981) is a former professional tennis player and current pickleball player from Slovenia.

In tennis, Pisnik turned professional in 1999. Pisnik's highest singles ranking was world No. 29, which she reached on 12 January 2004. Her career-high doubles ranking is world No. 63 on 3 April 2000. She won one singles title and two doubles titles on the WTA Tour.

== Biography ==
Her father Boris is a former Slovenian national team soccer player and a soccer coach and he traveled with her on tour. Her mother Saska is an economic technician. Other sports interests include basketball and soccer. She moved to United States in 2015 and was a High Performance director at CPAC, Lincolnshire until early 2020.

As a tennis player, Pisnik was a baseliner who played a serve-and-volley style game on grass. She owns a business called Smash Tennis and currently coaches privately at Bradenton Tennis Center in Bradenton, Florida.

== WTA Tour finals ==
=== Singles: 1 (title) ===
Tier I
Tier II
Tier III (1–0)
Tier IV & V

Result	Date	Tournament	Surface	Opponent	Score
Win	May 2000	Bol Ladies Open, Croatia	Clay	(France) Amélie Mauresmo	7–6^{(7–4)}, 7–6^{(7–2)}

=== Doubles: 3 (2 titles, 1 runner-up) ===
Result	W/L	Date	Tournament	Surface	Partnering	Opponent	Score
Win	1–0	Nov 1999	Kuala Lumpur Classic, Malaysia	Hard	(Croatia) Jelena Kostanić	(Japan) Rika Hiraki (Japan) Yuka Yoshida	3–6, 6–2, 6–4
Loss	1–1	May 2001	Bol Ladies Open, Croatia	Clay	(Russia) Nadia Petrova	(Spain) María José Martínez Sánchez (Spain) Anabel Medina Garrigues	5–7, 4–6
Win	2–1	Feb 2005	Copa Colsanitas, Colombia	Clay	(Switzerland) Emmanuelle Gagliardi	(Slovakia) Ľubomíra Kurhajcová (Czech Republic) Barbora Strýcová	6–4, 6–3

== ITF Circuit finals ==
=== Singles (1–0) ===
Legend $100,000 tournaments $75,000 tournaments $50,000 tournaments $25,000 tournaments $10,000 tournaments	Finals by surface Hard (0–0) Clay (1–0) Grass (0–0) Carpet (0–0)

Result	No.	Date	Tournament	Surface	Opponent	Score
Win	1.	18 August 1997	Maribor, Slovenia	Clay	(Austria) Nina Schwarz	6–0, 6–2

=== Doubles (3–1) ===
Legend $100,000 tournaments $75,000 tournaments $50,000 tournaments $25,000 tournaments $10,000 tournaments	Finals by surface Hard (0–1) Clay (2–0) Grass (0–0) Carpet (1–0)

Result	No.	Date	Tournament	Surface	Partner	Opponents	Score
Win	1.	9 June 1997	Velenje, Slovenia	Clay	(Slovenia) Tina Hergold	(Czech Republic) Helena Fremuthová (Canada) Aneta Soukup	w/o
Win	2.	18 August 1997	Maribor, Slovenia	Clay	(Slovenia) Tina Hergold	(Slovenia) Nives Ćulum (Slovenia) Tina Hojnik	6–3, 6–2
Loss	3.	15 February 1998	Rogaška Slatina, Slovenia	Hard (i)	(Germany) Miriam Schnitzer	(Slovenia) Tina Križan (Slovenia) Katarina Srebotnik	0–6, 3–6
Win	4.	1 February 2005	Ortisei, Italy	Carpet (i)	(Czech Republic) Barbora Záhlavová-Strýcová	(Croatia) Darija Jurak (Bosnia and Herzegovina) Mervana Jugić-Salkić	6–2, 3–6, 7–6^{(7–1)}

Sporting positions
Preceded by (Spain) Ana Alcázar	Orange Bowl Girls' Singles Champion; Category: 18 and under 1997	Succeeded by (Russia) Elena Dementieva
