= 1996 "M" Electronika Cup – Singles =

Singles
- 1996 "M" Electronika Cup

Final
- Champion: (Italy) Gloria Pizzichini
- Runner-up: (Croatia) Silvija Talaja
- Score: 6–0, 6–2

Details
- Draw: 32
- Seeds: 8

Events
Singles	Doubles
← 1995 ·	Croatian Bol Ladies Open	· 1997 →

Sabine Appelmans was the defending champion but did not compete that year.

Gloria Pizzichini won in the final 6–0, 6–2 against Silvija Talaja.

== Seeds ==
A champion seed is indicated in bold text while text in italics indicates the round in which that seed was eliminated.

1. (Croatia) Iva Majoli (second round)
2. (South Africa) Joannette Kruger (quarterfinals)
3. n/a
4. (France) Alexandra Fusai (first round)
5. (Slovakia) Radka Zrubáková (second round)
6. (Germany) Veronika Martinek (second round)
7. (Slovakia) Janette Husárová (second round)
8. (Argentina) Paola Suárez (quarterfinals)
9. (Slovakia) Henrieta Nagyová (first round)

== Draw ==
=== Key ===
- Q = Qualifier
- WC = Wild card
- LL = Lucky loser
- Alt = Alternate
- ITF = ITF entry
- PR = Protected ranking
- SR = Special ranking
- SE = Special exempt
- JE = Junior exempt
- JR = Junior Accelerator Programme entrant
- CO = College Accelerator Programme entrant
- NG = Next Gen Accelerator Program entrant
- w/o = Walkover
- r = Retired
- d = Defaulted

First round
1	(Croatia) **I Majoli**	4	**6**	**6**
(Romania) C Cristea	**6**	3	4
(Slovenia) B Mulej	0	3
(Italy) **G Pizzichini**	**6**	**6**
(Czech Republic) L Němečková	2	5
(Czech Republic) **S Kleinová**	**6**	**7**
Q	(Netherlands) A Snijders	5	1
7	(Slovakia) **J Husárová**	**7**	**6**
4	(France) A Fusai	2	2
(Italy) **F Perfetti**	**6**	**6**
(Spain) G León García	4	4
(Austria) **S Dopfer**	**6**	**6**
(Italy) **S Cecchini**	**6**	5	**6**
LL	(Czech Republic) P Langrová	1	**7**	2
Q	(Germany) M Vladulescu	1	3
6	(Germany) **V Martinek**	**6**	**6**
5	(Slovakia) **R Zrubáková**	**6**	**6**
(Slovenia) T Križan	3	2
(Madagascar) **D Randriantefy**	**6**	**6**
Q	(Austria) B Schwartz	4	3
WC	(Croatia) **S Talaja**	**6**	**6**
(Italy) L Golarsa	4	2
(France) **S Pitkowski**	3	**6**	**6**
9	(Slovakia) H Nagyová	**6**	4	3
8	(Argentina) **P Suárez**	**6**	**6**
Q	(Czech Republic) R Pelikánová	1	3
(France) **L Ghirardi**	**6**	**7**
WC	(Croatia) N Ercegović	4	5
(France) A D-Balleret	2	**7**	5
(Argentina) **M-J Gaidano**	**6**	6	**7**
(Spain) S Ramón-Cortés	**6**	4	3
2	(South Africa) **J Kruger**	3	**6**	**6**

Second round
1	(Croatia) I Majoli	1	**6**	3
(Italy) **G Pizzichini**	**6**	2	**6**
(Czech Republic) **S Kleinová**	5	**6**	**6**
7	(Slovakia) J Husárová	**7**	3	0
(Italy) F Perfetti	2	**7**	3
(Austria) **S Dopfer**	**6**	6	**6**
(Italy) **S Cecchini**	**6**	**6**
6	(Germany) V Martinek	1	0
5	(Slovakia) R Zrubáková	4	0
(Madagascar) **D Randriantefy**	**6**	**6**
WC	(Croatia) **S Talaja**	**6**	**6**
(France) S Pitkowski	1	1
8	(Argentina) **P Suárez**	**6**	**6**
(France) L Ghirardi	1	2
(Argentina) M-J Gaidano	6	5
2	(South Africa) **J Kruger**	**7**	**7**

Quarterfinals
(Italy) **G Pizzichini**	**6**	**6**
(Czech Republic) S Kleinová	3	2
(Austria) S Dopfer	3	4
(Italy) **S Cecchini**	**6**	**6**
(Madagascar) D Randriantefy	3	0
WC	(Croatia) **S Talaja**	**6**	**6**
8	(Argentina) **P Suárez**	**6**	**7**
2	(South Africa) J Kruger	0	5

Semifinals
(Italy) **G Pizzichini**	**7**	**6**
(Italy) S Cecchini	5	0
WC	(Croatia) **S Talaja**	**6**	3	**6**
8	(Argentina) P Suárez	2	**6**	4

Final
(Italy) **Gloria Pizzichini**	**6**	**6**
WC	(Croatia) Silvija Talaja	0	2
