= 1999 Egger Tennis Festival =

- Date: 5–11 July
- Edition: 29th
- Category: Tier IV Series
- Draw: 32S / 16D
- Prize money: $112,500
- Surface: Clay / outdoor
- Location: Pörtschach, Austria

Champions

Singles
- (Slovakia) Karina Habšudová

Doubles
- (Italy) Silvia Farina / (Slovakia) Karina Habšudová
- WTA Austrian Open

The 1999 Egger Tennis Festival was a women's tennis tournament played on outdoor clay courts. It was the 29th edition of the Austrian Open, and was part of the Tier IV Series of the 1999 WTA Tour. It took place in Pörtschach, Austria, from 5 July until 11 July 1999. Unseeded Karina Habšudová won the singles title.

== Finals ==
=== Singles ===
(Slovakia) Karina Habšudová defeated (Croatia) Silvija Talaja, 2–6, 6–4, 6–4

- It was Habšudová's first career title after losing in three finals.

=== Doubles ===
(Italy) Silvia Farina / (Slovakia) Karina Habšudová defeated (Ukraine) Olga Lugina / (Argentina) Laura Montalvo, 6–4, 6–4

== Entrants ==
=== Seeds ===
| Country | Player | Rank | Seed |
|---|---|---|---|
| SUI | Patty Schnyder | 19 | 1 |
| ITA | Silvia Farina | 24 | 2 |
| SVK | Henrieta Nagyová | 25 | 3 |
| AUT | Sylvia Plischke | 27 | 4 |
| GER | Anke Huber | 30 | 5 |
| ESP | Magüi Serna | 33 | 6 |
| FRA | Sarah Pitkowski | 38 | 7 |
| ISR | Anna Smashnova | 39 | 8 |

=== Other entrants ===
The following players received wildcards into the singles main draw:

- (China) Li Fang
- (Austria) Patricia Wartusch
- (Austria) Marion Maruska

The following players received entry from the singles qualifying draw:

- (Spain) Ángeles Montolio
- (Czech Republic) Adriana Gerši
- (Hungary) Anna Földényi
- (Czech Republic) Lenka Němečková

The following players received entry from the doubles qualifying draw:

- (Austria) Barbara Schwartz / (Austria) Patricia Wartusch
