= 1991 Croatian Lottery Cup – Singles =

Singles
- 1991 Croatian Lottery Cup

Final
- Champion: (Italy) Sandra Cecchini
- Runner-up: (Bulgaria) Magdalena Maleeva
- Score: 6–4, 3–6, 7–5

Details
- Draw: 32 (2WC/4Q)
- Seeds: 8

Events
Singles	Doubles
Croatian Bol Ladies Open	· 1995 →

In the inaugural edition of the tournament, Sandra Cecchini won the title by defeating Magdalena Maleeva 6–4, 3–6, 7–5 in the final.

== Seeds ==
1. (Canada) Helen Kelesi (semifinals)
2. (Italy) Sandra Cecchini (champion)
3. (Bulgaria) Magdalena Maleeva (final)
4. (Italy) Laura Golarsa (first round)
5. (Germany) Veronika Martinek (first round)
6. (Czechoslovakia) Andrea Strnadová (quarterfinals)
7. (Italy) Laura Garrone (quarterfinals)
8. (Hungary) Csilla Bartos (quarterfinals)

== Draw ==
=== Key ===
- Q = Qualifier
- WC = Wild card
- LL = Lucky loser
- Alt = Alternate
- SE = Special exempt
- PR = Protected ranking
- ITF = ITF entry
- JE = Junior exempt
- w/o = Walkover
- r = Retired
- d = Defaulted
- SR = Special ranking

=== Finals ===
Semifinals
1	(Canada) Helen Kelesi	4	5
3	(Bulgaria) Magdalena Maleeva	6	7
(France) Sandrine Testud
2	(Italy) Sandra Cecchini	w/o

Final
3	(Bulgaria) Magdalena Maleeva	4	6	5
2	(Italy) Sandra Cecchini	6	3	7

=== Top half ===
First round
1	(Canada) H Kelesi	6	6
Q	(Czechoslovakia) R Bobková	1	4
(Germany) S Meier	3	3
(Finland) P Thorén	6	6
(Hungary) AM Földényi	6	6
(Austria) B Reinstadler	3	1
(Canada) R Simpson-Alter	6	6
5	(Germany) V Martinek	4	1
3	(Bulgaria) M Maleeva	7	6
(Soviet Union) E Maniokova	5	1
(Austria) M Maruska	2	2
(Netherlands) S Rottier	6	6
Q	(Germany) A Kerek	6	6
(United Kingdom) S Smith	1	4
(Sweden) C Dahlman	6	2	4
7	(Italy) L Garrone	3	6	6

Second round
1	(Canada) H Kelesi	6	6
(Finland) P Thorén	1	2
(Hungary) AM Földényi	6	6
(Canada) R Simpson-Alter	3	3
3	(Bulgaria) M Maleeva	6	6
(Netherlands) S Rottier	3	4
Q	(Germany) A Kerek	3	0
7	(Italy) L Garrone	6	6

Quarterfinals
1	(Canada) H Kelesi	7	6
(Hungary) AM Földényi	5	1
3	(Bulgaria) M Maleeva	6	7
7	(Italy) L Garrone	3	5

Semifinals
1	(Canada) H Kelesi	4	5
3	(Bulgaria) M Maleeva	6	7

=== Bottom half ===
First round
8	(Hungary) C Bartos	7^{7}	7^{7}
Q	(Germany) A Popp	6^{3}	6^{4}
WC	(Socialist Federal Republic of Yugoslavia) N Ercegović	6	6^{4}	6
(Germany) M Kochta	2	7^{7}	3
(France) S Testud	6	6
(Italy) B Romanò	1	2
(Brazil) L Corsato	6	0	7^{8}
4	(Italy) L Golarsa	3	6	6^{6}
6	(Czechoslovakia) A Strnadová	6	7^{7}
WC	(Socialist Federal Republic of Yugoslavia) B Mulej	3	6^{4}
Q	(Germany) T Hauschildt	2	3
(Austria) S Dopfer	6	6
(Poland) K Nowak	6	7
(Czechoslovakia) L Lásková	3	5
(Finland) N Dahlman	3	1
2	(Italy) S Cecchini	6	6

Second round
8	(Hungary) C Bartos	6	6
WC	(Socialist Federal Republic of Yugoslavia) N Ercegović	4	4
(France) S Testud	6	6
(Brazil) L Corsato	2	4
6	(Czechoslovakia) A Strnadová	6	6
(Austria) S Dopfer	4	2
(Poland) K Nowak	2	5
2	(Italy) S Cecchini	6	7

Quarterfinals
8	(Hungary) C Bartos	2	2
(France) S Testud	6	6
6	(Czechoslovakia) A Strnadová	4	4
2	(Italy) S Cecchini	6	6

Semifinals
(France) S Testud
2	(Italy) S Cecchini	w/o
