= 1996 "M" Electronika Cup – Doubles =

Doubles
- 1996 "M" Electronika Cup

Final
- Champions: (Argentina) Laura Montalvo (Argentina) Paola Suárez
- Runners-up: (France) Alexia Dechaume-Balleret (France) Alexandra Fusai
- Score: 6–7, 6–3, 6–4

Details
- Draw: 16
- Seeds: 4

Events
Singles	Doubles
← 1995 ·	Croatian Bol Ladies Open	· 1997 →

Mercedes Paz and Rene Simpson were the defending champions but did not compete that year.

Laura Montalvo and Paola Suárez won in the final 6–7, 6–3, 6–4 against Alexia Dechaume-Balleret and Alexandra Fusai.

== Seeds ==
Champion seeds are indicated in bold text while text in italics indicates the round in which those seeds were eliminated.

1. (France) Alexia Dechaume-Balleret / (France) Alexandra Fusai (final)
2. (Italy) Sandra Cecchini / (Italy) Laura Garrone (quarterfinals)
3. (Czech Republic) Petra Langrová / (Slovakia) Radka Zrubáková (first round)
4. (Italy) Flora Perfetti / (Italy) Gloria Pizzichini (semifinals)

== Draw ==
=== Key ===
- Q = Qualifier
- WC = Wild card
- LL = Lucky loser
- Alt = Alternate
- ITF = ITF entry
- PR = Protected ranking
- SR = Special ranking
- SE = Special exempt
- JE = Junior exempt
- JR = Junior Accelerator Programme entrant
- CO = College Accelerator Programme entrant
- NG = Next Gen Accelerator Program entrant
- w/o = Walkover
- r = Retired
- d = Defaulted

First round
1	(France) **A Dechaume-Balleret** (France) **A Fusai**	**6**	3	**6**
(Slovenia) T Križan (Croatia) M Murić	2	**6**	4
Q	(Czech Republic) R Pelikánová (Germany) M Vladulescu	0	0
(Germany) **V Martinek** (Czech Republic) **L Němečková**	**6**	**6**
3	(Czech Republic) P Langrová (Slovakia) R Zrubáková	3	4
(South Africa) **J Kruger** (Slovakia) **H Nagyová**	**6**	**6**
(Germany) **A Barna** (Austria) **B Schwartz**	**6**	3	**6**
(France) L Ghirardi (France) S Pitkowski	1	**6**	3
(Romania) **C Cristea** (Germany) **C Schneider**	**w/o**
(Spain) G León García (Spain) S Ramón-Cortés
(Argentina) B Fulco-Villella (Slovakia) J Husárová	1	3
4	(Italy) **F Perfetti** (Italy) **G Pizzichini**	**6**	**6**
(Argentina) **L Montalvo** (Argentina) **P Suárez**	**6**	**6**
WC	(Croatia) N Ercegović (Madagascar) D Randriantefy	4	3
(Netherlands) A Snijders (France) N van Lottum	3	3
2	(Italy) **S Cecchini** (Italy) **L Garrone**	**6**	**6**

Quarterfinals
1	(France) **A Dechaume-Balleret** (France) **A Fusai**	**7**	**6**
(Germany) V Martinek (Czech Republic) L Němečková	6	0
(South Africa) **J Kruger** (Slovakia) **H Nagyová**	**6**	**7**
(Germany) A Barna (Austria) B Schwartz	4	5
(Romania) C Cristea (Germany) C Schneider	1	5
4	(Italy) **F Perfetti** (Italy) **G Pizzichini**	**6**	**7**
(Argentina) **L Montalvo** (Argentina) **P Suárez**	**6**	**6**
2	(Italy) S Cecchini (Italy) L Garrone	2	1

Semifinals
1	(France) **A Dechaume-Balleret** (France) **A Fusai**	**6**	**6**
(South Africa) J Kruger (Slovakia) H Nagyová	3	0
4	(Italy) F Perfetti (Italy) G Pizzichini	1	6
(Argentina) **L Montalvo** (Argentina) **P Suárez**	**6**	**7**

Final
1	(France) Alexia Dechaume-Balleret (France) Alexandra Fusai	**7**	3	4
(Argentina) **Laura Montalvo** (Argentina) **Paola Suárez**	6	**6**	**6**
