= 2018 Bol Open – Singles =

Singles
- 2018 Bol Open

Final
- Champion: (Slovenia) Tamara Zidanšek
- Runner-up: (Poland) Magda Linette
- Score: 6-1, 6-3

Events
Singles	Doubles
← 2017 ·	Bol Open	· 2019 →

Aleksandra Krunić was the reigning champion, but chose not to defend her title.

Tamara Zidanšek won the title, defeating Magda Linette in the final 6–1, 6–3.

== Seeds ==
1. (Ukraine) Kateryna Kozlova (first round)
2. (Poland) Magda Linette (final)
3. (Australia) Ajla Tomljanović (first round)
4. (Italy) Sara Errani (semifinals, withdrew)
5. (Slovakia) Anna Karolína Schmiedlová (quarterfinals)
6. (China) Wang Yafan (first round)
7. (Switzerland) Viktorija Golubic (quarterfinals)
8. (Colombia) Mariana Duque Mariño (quarterfinals)

== Draw ==
=== Key ===
- Q = Qualifier
- WC = Wild card
- LL = Lucky loser
- Alt = Alternate
- SE = Special exempt
- PR = Protected ranking
- ITF = ITF entry
- JE = Junior exempt
- w/o = Walkover
- r = Retired
- d = Defaulted
- SR = Special ranking

=== Finals ===
Semifinals
WC	(Croatia) Tena Lukas	4	3
(Slovenia) Tamara Zidanšek	6	6
4	(Italy) Sara Errani
2	(Poland) Magda Linette	w/o

Final
(Slovenia) Tamara Zidanšek	6	6
2	(Poland) Magda Linette	1	3

=== Top half ===
First round
1	(Ukraine) K Kozlova	3	1
(Canada) C Zhao	6	6
WC	(Croatia) T Lukas	6	6
(Spain) E Cabeza Candela	1	0
(China) S Zheng	5	3
(Luxembourg) M Minella	7	6
(Czech Republic) T Martincová	6	3	2
8	(Colombia) M Duque Mariño	2	6	6
3	(Australia) A Tomljanović	3	1
(Slovenia) T Zidanšek	6	6
(Belgium) Y Bonaventure	2	0
(Romania) A Cadanțu	6	6
(Italy) J Paolini	5	3
(Spain) S Soler Espinosa	7	6
(Ukraine) M Kostyuk	5	2
5	(Slovakia) AK Schmiedlová	7	6

Second round
(Canada) C Zhao	0	6	5
WC	(Croatia) T Lukas	6	2	7
(Luxembourg) M Minella	3	1
8	(Colombia) M Duque Mariño	6	6
(Slovenia) T Zidanšek	6^{2}	6	6
(Romania) A Cadanțu	7^{7}	3	3
(Spain) S Soler Espinosa	2	1
5	(Slovakia) AK Schmiedlová	6	6

Quarterfinals
WC	(Croatia) T Lukas	6	4	6
8	(Colombia) M Duque Mariño	4	6	1
(Slovenia) T Zidanšek	6	6
5	(Slovakia) AK Schmiedlová	4	4

Semifinals
WC	(Croatia) T Lukas	4	3
(Slovenia) T Zidanšek	6	6

=== Bottom half ===
First round
6	(China) Y Wang	6	4	6^{5}
(Spain) S Sorribes Tormo	3	6	7^{7}
(Russia) S Zhuk	6	6
(Slovakia) K Kučová	2	3
(Germany) M Barthel	6	2	5
(Bulgaria) V Tomova	4	6	7
(Australia) N Bains	3	0
4	(Italy) S Errani	6	6
7	(Switzerland) V Golubic	6	7^{7}
WC	(Czech Republic) B Štefková	4	6^{0}
(Slovakia) M Hončová	4	6	6
(Romania) E-G Ruse	6	4	3
(Montenegro) D Kovinić	6	6
WC	(Croatia) L Bošković	3	2
(Ukraine) A Kalinina	4	6^{0}
2	(Poland) M Linette	6	7^{7}

Second round
(Spain) S Sorribes Tormo	6	6
(Russia) S Zhuk	4	0
(Bulgaria) V Tomova	1	6	2
4	(Italy) S Errani	6	4	6
7	(Switzerland) V Golubic	6	0	6
(Slovakia) M Hončová	3	6	3
(Montenegro) D Kovinić	4	6	1
2	(Poland) M Linette	6	2	6

Quarterfinals
(Spain) S Sorribes Tormo	1	4
4	(Italy) S Errani	6	6
7	(Switzerland) V Golubic	5	4
2	(Poland) M Linette	7	6

Semifinals
4	(Italy) S Errani
2	(Poland) M Linette	w/o
