= 1995 Croatian Ladies Open =

- Date: 24–30 April
- Edition: 2nd
- Category: Tier III
- Draw: 32S / 16D
- Prize money: $161,250
- Surface: Clay / outdoor
- Location: Zagreb, Croatia
- Venue: Športski Park Mladost

Champions

Singles
- (Belgium) Sabine Appelmans

Doubles
- (Argentina) Mercedes Paz / (Canada) Rene Simpson
← 1991 ·	Zagreb Open	· 1996 →

The 1995 Croatian Ladies Open, also known as the Zagreb Open, was a women's tennis tournament played on outdoor clay courts at the Športski Park Mladost in Zagreb in Croatia that was part of Tier III of the 1995 WTA Tour. It was the second edition of the tournament and was held from 24 April through 30 April 1995. Fifth-seeded Sabine Appelmans won the singles title.

== Finals ==
=== Singles ===
(Belgium) Sabine Appelmans defeated (Germany) Silke Meier 6–4, 6–3

- It was Appelmans' only singles title of the year and the 6th of her career.

=== Doubles ===
(Argentina) Mercedes Paz / (Canada) Rene Simpson defeated (Italy) Laura Golarsa / (Romania) Irina Spîrlea 7–5, 6–2

- It was Paz's only title of the year and the 25th of her career. It was Simpson's 2nd title of the year and the 3rd of her career.
