= 2018 Bol Open =

- Date: 5–10 June
- Edition: 13th
- Category: WTA 125K series
- Prize money: $125,000
- Surface: Clay
- Location: Bol, Croatia
- Venue: Bluesun Tennis Center Zlatni rat

Champions

Singles
- (Slovenia) Tamara Zidanšek

Doubles
- (Colombia) Mariana Duque Mariño / (China) Wang Yafan
← 2017 ·	Bol Open	· 2019 →

The 2018 Bol Open was a professional tennis tournament played on outdoor clay courts. It was the thirteenth edition of the tournament and part of the 2018 WTA 125K series. It took place in Bol, Croatia, on 5–10 June 2018.

== Singles main draw entrants ==
=== Seeds ===
Country	Player	Rank^{1}	Seed
UKR	Kateryna Kozlova	67	1
POL	Magda Linette	68	2
AUS	Ajla Tomljanović	69	3
ITA	Sara Errani	75	4
SVK	Anna Karolína Schmiedlová	77	5
CHN	Wang Yafan	82	6
SUI	Viktorija Golubic	110	7
COL	Mariana Duque Mariño	112	8

- ^{1} Rankings as of 28 May 2018.

=== Other entrants ===
The following players received a wildcard into the singles main draw:

- (Croatia) Lea Bošković
- (Croatia) Tena Lukas
- (Czech Republic) Barbora Štefková

=== Withdrawals ===
Before the tournament

- (United States) Jennifer Brady → replaced by (Romania) Elena-Gabriela Ruse
- (Slovakia) Jana Čepelová → replaced by (Czech Republic) Tereza Martincová
- (Slovenia) Dalila Jakupović → replaced by (Slovakia) Kristína Kučová
- (Sweden) Johanna Larsson → replaced by (Spain) Sílvia Soler Espinosa
- (United States) Bernarda Pera → replaced by (Romania) Alexandra Cadanțu
- (Sweden) Rebecca Peterson → replaced by (Bulgaria) Viktoriya Tomova
- (Kazakhstan) Yulia Putintseva → replaced by (Slovakia) Michaela Hončová
- (Switzerland) Stefanie Vögele → replaced by (Russia) Sofya Zhuk

== Doubles entrants ==
=== Seeds ===
Country	Player	Country	Player	Rank^{1}	Seed
SUI	Xenia Knoll	CZE	Renata Voráčová	102	1
USA	Kaitlyn Christian	USA	Sabrina Santamaria	165	2
CRO	Darija Jurak	SWE	Cornelia Lister	170	3
COL	Mariana Duque-Mariño	CHN	Wang Yafan	208	4

- ^{1} Rankings as of 28 May 2018.

The following team received wildcard into the doubles draw:

- (Ukraine) Anhelina Kalinina / (Ukraine) Marta Kostyuk

== Champions ==
=== Singles ===
- (Slovenia) Tamara Zidanšek def. (Poland) Magda Linette 6–1, 6–3

=== Doubles ===
- (Colombia) Mariana Duque Mariño / (China) Wang Yafan def. (Spain) Sílvia Soler Espinosa / (Czech Republic) Barbora Štefková 6–3, 7–5
