= 2019 Bol Open =

- Date: 4–9 June
- Edition: 14th
- Category: WTA 125K series
- Prize money: $125,000
- Surface: Clay
- Location: Bol, Croatia
- Venue: Bluesun Tennis Center Zlatni rat

Champions

Singles
- (Slovenia) Tamara Zidanšek

Doubles
- (Switzerland) Timea Bacsinszky / (Luxembourg) Mandy Minella
← 2018 ·	Bol Open	· 2021 →

The 2019 Bol Open was a professional tennis tournament played on outdoor clay courts. It was the fourteenth edition of the tournament and part of the 2019 WTA 125K series. It took place in Bol, Croatia, from 4 to 9 June 2019.

== Singles main draw entrants ==
=== Seeds ===
Country	Player	Rank^{1}	Seed
SLO	Tamara Zidanšek	60	1
ESP	Sara Sorribes Tormo	75	2
SRB	Aleksandra Krunić	76	3
SVK	Anna Karolína Schmiedlová	90	4
AUS	Astra Sharma	92	5
SUI	Jil Teichmann	93	6
SUI	Timea Bacsinszky	94	7
GER	Laura Siegemund	95	8

- ^{1} Rankings as of 27 May 2019.

=== Other entrants ===
The following players received a wildcard into the singles main draw:

- (Croatia) Lea Bošković
- (Kazakhstan) Anna Danilina
- (Serbia) Mihaela Đaković
- (Croatia) Jana Fett

The following players used protected ranking to enter the singles main draw:

- (Czech Republic) Denisa Allertová
- (Germany) Anna-Lena Friedsam
- (United States) Anna Tatishvili

=== Withdrawals ===
Before the tournament

- (Germany) Mona Barthel → replaced by (Spain) Paula Badosa Gibert
- (France) Fiona Ferro → replaced by (Serbia) Olga Danilović
- (Australia) Daria Gavrilova → replaced by (Brazil) Beatriz Haddad Maia
- (Slovenia) Polona Hercog → replaced by (Russia) Varvara Flink
- (Estonia) Kaia Kanepi → replaced by (Netherlands) Bibiane Schoofs
- (Sweden) Johanna Larsson → replaced by (Georgia (country)) Ekaterine Gorgodze
- (Poland) Magda Linette → replaced by (Slovenia) Kaja Juvan
- (United States) Bernarda Pera → replaced by (Japan) Nao Hibino
- (Czech Republic) Kristýna Plíšková → replaced by (Romania) Ana Bogdan
- (Poland) Iga Świątek → replaced by (Croatia) Tereza Mrdeža

== Doubles entrants ==
=== Seeds ===
Country	Player	Country	Player	Rank^{1}	Seed
SWE	Cornelia Lister	CZE	Renata Voráčová	171	1
SUI	Timea Bacsinszky	LUX	Mandy Minella	236	2
UZB	Akgul Amanmuradova	JPN	Nao Hibino	241	3
KAZ	Anna Danilina	RUS	Yana Sizikova	264	4

- ^{1} Rankings as of 27 May 2019.

The following team received a wildcard into the doubles draw:

- (Croatia) Lea Bošković / (Serbia) Mihaela Đaković

== Champions ==
=== Singles ===
- (Slovenia) Tamara Zidanšek def. (Spain) Sara Sorribes Tormo, 7–5, 7–5

=== Doubles ===
- (Switzerland) Timea Bacsinszky / (Luxembourg) Mandy Minella def. (Sweden) Cornelia Lister / (Czech Republic) Renata Voráčová 0–6, 7–6^{(7–3)}, [10–4]
