= 1999 Egger Tennis Festival – Doubles =

Doubles
- 1999 Egger Tennis Festival

Final
- Champions: (Italy) Silvia Farina (Slovakia) Karina Habšudová
- Runners-up: (Ukraine) Olga Lugina (Argentina) Laura Montalvo
- Score: 6–4, 6–4

Details
- Draw: 16
- Seeds: 4

Events
Singles	Doubles
- Egger Tennis Festival

The 1999 Egger Tennis Festival singles was the singles event of the twenty-ninth edition of the Egger Tennis Festival; a WTA Tier IV tournament and the second most prestigious women's tennis tournament held in Austria. Laura Montalvo and Paola Suárez were the defending champions, but they didn't compete together this year. Montalvo played with Olga Lugina as the third seed, while Suárez teamed up with Virginia Ruano Pascual as the second seed.

Ruano Pascual and Suárez were defeated in the first round with home qualifiers Barbara Schwartz and Patricia Wartusch, while Montalvo and Lugina reached the final, where they were defeated by Silvia Farina and Karina Habšudová.

== Seeds ==
1. (Italy) Silvia Farina / (Slovakia) Karina Habšudová (champions)
2. (Spain) Virginia Ruano Pascual / (Argentina) Paola Suárez (first round)
3. (Ukraine) Olga Lugina / (Argentina) Laura Montalvo (final)
4. (Sweden) Åsa Carlsson / (Canada) Sonya Jeyaseelan (semifinals)

== Draw ==
Key

- Q = Qualifier
- WC = Wild card
- LL = Lucky loser
- Alt = Alternate
- ITF = ITF entry
- PR = Protected ranking
- SR = Special ranking
- SE = Special exempt
- JE = Junior exempt
- JR = Junior Accelerator Programme entrant
- CO = College Accelerator Programme entrant
- NG = Next Gen Accelerator Program entrant
- w/o = Walkover
- r = Retired
- d = Defaulted

First round
1	(Italy) S Farina (Slovakia) K Habšudová	7	4	6
(Bulgaria) S Krivencheva (Czech Republic) E Melicharová	6	6	3
(Belarus) O Barabanschikova (United States) S Reeves	2	0
(Austria) S Plischke (Switzerland) P Schnyder	6	6
4	(Sweden) Å Carlsson (Canada) S Jeyaseelan	6	6
(Bulgaria) L Bacheva (Germany) C Schneider	4	2
(Slovakia) H Nagyová (Czech Republic) H Vildová	6	3	4
(Germany) W Probst (Germany) C Singer	4	6	6
(France) A Cocheteux (France) É Loit	2	6
(Germany) A Huber (Germany) E Wagner	6	7
(France) A Dechaume-Balleret (France) S Pitkowski	5	3
3	(Ukraine) O Lugina (Argentina) L Montalvo	7	6
(Switzerland) E Gagliardi (Hungary) K Marosi	6	3	6
(Spain) A Ortuño (Spain) C Torrens Valero	3	6	1
Q	(Austria) B Schwartz (Austria) P Wartusch	6	6	7
2	(Spain) V Ruano Pascual (Argentina) P Suárez	7	4	5

Quarterfinals
1	(Italy) S Farina (Slovakia) K Habšudová	7	6
(Austria) S Plischke (Switzerland) P Schnyder	6	1
4	(Sweden) Å Carlsson (Canada) S Jeyaseelan	6	6
(Germany) W Probst (Germany) C Singer	1	2
(Germany) A Huber (Germany) E Wagner	3	4
3	(Ukraine) O Lugina (Argentina) L Montalvo	6	6
(Switzerland) E Gagliardi (Hungary) K Marosi	4	7	6
Q	(Austria) B Schwartz (Austria) P Wartusch	6	5	4

Semifinals
1	(Italy) S Farina (Slovakia) K Habšudová	6	6
4	(Sweden) Å Carlsson (Canada) S Jeyaseelan	3	1
3	(Ukraine) O Lugina (Argentina) L Montalvo	6	6
(Switzerland) E Gagliardi (Hungary) K Marosi	3	3

Final
1	(Italy) S Farina (Slovakia) K Habšudová	6	6
3	(Ukraine) O Lugina (Argentina) L Montalvo	4	4

== Qualifying ==
=== Seeds ===
1. (Croatia) Jelena Kostanić / (Spain) Gisela Riera (qualifying competition)
2. (Austria) Barbara Schwartz / (Austria) Patricia Wartusch (champions)

=== Qualifiers ===
1. (Austria) Barbara Schwartz / (Austria) Patricia Wartusch

== Qualifying draw ==
Key

- Q = Qualifier
- WC = Wild card
- LL = Lucky loser
- Alt = Alternate
- ITF = ITF entry
- PR = Protected ranking
- SR = Special ranking
- SE = Special exempt
- JE = Junior exempt
- JR = Junior Accelerator Programme entrant
- CO = College Accelerator Programme entrant
- NG = Next Gen Accelerator Program entrant
- w/o = Walkover
- r = Retired
- d = Defaulted

First round
1	(Croatia) Jelena Kostanić (Spain) Gisela Riera	9
WC	(South Africa) Joannette Kruger (Bulgaria) Magdalena Maleeva	7
(Slovenia) Tina Pisnik (Croatia) Silvija Talaja	8
(Austria) Susanne Flipp (Hungary) Anna Földényi	2
(Germany) Adriana Barna (Germany) Anca Barna	8
(Austria) Sybille Bammer (Japan) Maiko Inoue	1
(Japan) Keiko Ishida (Japan) Keiko Nagatomi	2
2	(Austria) Barbara Schwartz (Austria) Patricia Wartusch	8

Second round
1	(Croatia) Jelena Kostanić (Spain) Gisela Riera	8
(Slovenia) Tina Pisnik (Croatia) Silvija Talaja	4
(Germany) Adriana Barna (Germany) Anca Barna	1
2	(Austria) Barbara Schwartz (Austria) Patricia Wartusch	8

Qualifying competition
1	(Croatia) Jelena Kostanić (Spain) Gisela Riera	3
2	(Austria) Barbara Schwartz (Austria) Patricia Wartusch	8
