= Croatian Bol Ladies Open =

Defunct tennis tournament
- Founded: 1991
- Abolished: 2021
- Location: Bol; Croatia
- Venue: Bluesun Tennis Center Zlatni rat
- Category: Tier V (1991); Tier III (1995, 2000–03); Tier IV (1996–99); WTA 125k (2016–2021)
- Surface: Clay
- Draw: 32S/8Q/16D
- Prize money: $115,000 (2021)

Current champions (2021)
- Singles: (Italy) Jasmine Paolini
- Doubles: (Spain) Aliona Bolsova (Poland) Katarzyna Kawa

Croatian Bol Ladies Open was an annual women's tennis tournament on the WTA Challenger Tour, played in the town of Bol on the Croatian Adriatic island of Brač. The first edition was held in late April 1991, and then again every year from 1995 to 2003. The tournament was then sold to the organizers of the Western & Southern Open and moved to Cincinnati. In 2022, it was moved to Makarska.

== Past finals ==
=== Singles ===
Year	Tier	Champion	Runner-up	Score
1991	V	(Italy) Sandra Cecchini	(Bulgaria) Magdalena Maleeva	6–4, 3–6, 7–5
1995	III	(Belgium) Sabine Appelmans	(Germany) Silke Meier	6–4, 6–3
1996	IV	(Italy) Gloria Pizzichini	(Croatia) Silvija Talaja	6–0, 6–2
1997	IV	(Croatia) Mirjana Lučić	(United States) Corina Morariu	7–5, 6–7, 7–6
1998	IVa	(Croatia) Mirjana Lučić (2)	(United States) Corina Morariu	6–2, 6–4
1999	IV	(United States) Corina Morariu	(France) Julie Halard	6–2, 6–0
2000	III	(Slovenia) Tina Pisnik	(France) Amélie Mauresmo	7–6, 7–6
2001	III	(Spain) Ángeles Montolio	(Argentina) Mariana Díaz Oliva	3–6, 6–2, 6–4
2002	III	(Sweden) Åsa Svensson	(Croatia) Iva Majoli	6–3, 4–6, 6–1
2003	III	(Russia) Vera Zvonareva	(Spain) Conchita Martínez G.	6–1, 6–3
↓ WTA 125K series ↓
2016	125k	(Luxembourg) Mandy Minella	(Slovenia) Polona Hercog	6–2, 6–3
2017	125k	(Serbia) Aleksandra Krunić	(Romania) Alexandra Cadanțu	6–3, 3–0 ret.
2018	125k	(Slovenia) Tamara Zidanšek	(Poland) Magda Linette	6–1, 6–3
2019	125k	(Slovenia) Tamara Zidanšek (2)	(Spain) Sara Sorribes Tormo	7–5, 7–5
2020		Cancelled due to the COVID-19 pandemic		
2021	125k	(Italy) Jasmine Paolini	(Netherlands) Arantxa Rus	6–2, 7–6^{(7–4)}

=== Doubles ===
Year	Tier	Champions	Runners-up	Score
1991	V	(Italy) Laura Golarsa (Bulgaria) Magdalena Maleeva	(Italy) Sandra Cecchini (Italy) Laura Garrone	walkover
1995	III	(Argentina) Mercedes Paz (Canada) Rene Simpson	(Italy) Laura Golarsa (Romania) Irina Spîrlea	7–5, 6–2
1996	IV	(Argentina) Laura Montalvo (Argentina) Paola Suárez	(France) Alexia Dechaume (France) Alexandra Fusai	6–7, 6–3, 6–4
1997	IV	(Argentina) Laura Montalvo (2) (Slovakia) Henrieta Nagyová	(Argentina) María José Gaidano (Austria) Marion Maruska	6–3, 6–1
1998	IVa	(Argentina) Laura Montalvo (3) (Argentina) Paola Suárez (2)	(South Africa) Joannette Kruger (Croatia) Mirjana Lučić	walkover
1999	IV	(Croatia) Jelena Kostanić (Czech Republic) Michaela Paštiková	(United States) Meghann Shaughnessy (Romania) Andreea Vanc	7–5, 6–7, 6–2
2001	III	(France) Julie Halard (United States) Corina Morariu	(Slovenia) Tina Križan (Slovenia) Katarina Srebotnik	6–2, 6–2
2001	III	(Spain) María Martínez (Spain) Anabel Medina	(Russia) Nadia Petrova (Slovenia) Tina Pisnik	7–5, 6–4
2002	III	(Italy) Tathiana Garbin (Indonesia) Angelique Widjaja	(Russia) Elena Bovina (Slovakia) Henrieta Nagyová	7–5, 3–6, 6–4
2003	III	(Hungary) Petra Mandula (Austria) Patricia Wartusch	(Switzerland) Emmanuelle Gagliardi (Switzerland) Patty Schnyder	6–3, 6–2
↓ WTA 125K series ↓
2016	125k	(Switzerland) Xenia Knoll (Croatia) Petra Martić	(Romania) Raluca Olaru (Turkey) İpek Soylu	6–3, 6–2
2017	125k	(Chinese Taipei) Chuang Chia-jung (Czech Republic) Renata Voráčová	(North Macedonia) Lina Gjorcheska (Bulgaria) Aleksandrina Naydenova	6–4, 6–2
2018	125k	(Colombia) Mariana Duque Mariño (China) Wang Yafan	(Spain) Sílvia Soler Espinosa (Czech Republic) Barbora Štefková	6–3, 7–5
2019	125k	(Switzerland) Timea Bacsinszky (Luxembourg) Mandy Minella	(Sweden) Cornelia Lister (Czech Republic) Renata Voráčová	0–6, 7–6^{(7–3)}, [10–4]
2020		Cancelled due to the COVID-19 pandemic		
2021	125k	(Spain) Aliona Bolsova (Poland) Katarzyna Kawa	(Georgia (country)) Ekaterine Gorgodze (Slovakia) Tereza Mihalíková	6–1, 4–6, [10–6]

== Other ==
- There is an ITF women's tennis tournament called Bluesun Bol Ladies Open or Bluesun Ladies Open that is held at the same courts.

== See also ==
- Makarska International Championships
- Croatia Open
- Zagreb Indoors
- Zagreb Open
