= 2019 Bol Open – Doubles =

Doubles
- 2019 Bol Open

Final
- Champions: (Switzerland) Timea Bacsinszky (Luxembourg) Mandy Minella
- Runners-up: (Sweden) Cornelia Lister (Czech Republic) Renata Voráčová
- Score: 0–6, 7–6^{(7–3)}, [10–4]

Events
Singles	Doubles
← 2018 ·	Bol Open	· 2021 →

Mariana Duque Mariño and Wang Yafan were the defending champions, but Duque Mariño has since retired from professional tennis and Wang chose not to participate.

Timea Bacsinszky and Mandy Minella won the title, defeating Cornelia Lister and Renata Voráčová in the final, 0–6, 7–6^{(7–3)}, [10–4].

== Seeds ==
1. (Sweden) Cornelia Lister / (Czech Republic) Renata Voráčová (final)
2. (Switzerland) Timea Bacsinszky / (Luxembourg) Mandy Minella (champions)
3. (Uzbekistan) Akgul Amanmuradova / (Japan) Nao Hibino (quarterfinals)
4. (Kazakhstan) Anna Danilina / (Russia) Yana Sizikova (first round)

== Draw ==
=== Key ===
- Q = Qualifier
- WC = Wild card
- LL = Lucky loser
- Alt = Alternate
- SE = Special exempt
- PR = Protected ranking
- ITF = ITF entry
- JE = Junior exempt
- w/o = Walkover
- r = Retired
- d = Defaulted
- SR = Special ranking

=== Draw ===
First round
(Belgium) Y Bonaventure (Netherlands) B Schoofs	6	7
(Slovenia) D Jakupović (Croatia) T Lukas	4	5
(Indonesia) B Gumulya (Indonesia) J Rompies	6	2	[14]
(Croatia) J Fett (Switzerland) J Teichmann	3	6	[12]
(Russia) A Fomina (Croatia) T Mrdeža	4	6	[10]
(Australia) A Sharma (Ukraine) V Strakhova	6	2	[4]
(Romania) A Bogdan (Slovakia) C Škamlová	4	6	[10]
4	(Kazakhstan) A Danilina (Russia) Y Sizikova	6	1	[6]
WC	(Croatia) L Bošković (Serbia) M Đaković	0	0
(Serbia) O Danilović (Slovenia) T Zidanšek	6	6

Quarterfinals
1	(Sweden) C Lister (Czech Republic) R Voráčová	6	7
(Belgium) Y Bonaventure (Netherlands) B Schoofs	2	5
3	(Uzbekistan) A Amanmuradova (Japan) N Hibino	4	4
(Indonesia) B Gumulya (Indonesia) J Rompies	6	6
(Russia) A Fomina (Croatia) T Mrdeža	6	3	[6]
(Romania) A Bogdan (Slovakia) C Škamlová	2	6	[10]
(Serbia) O Danilović (Slovenia) T Zidanšek	4	6	[4]
2	(Switzerland) T Bacsinszky (Luxembourg) M Minella	6	4	[10]

Semifinals
1	(Sweden) C Lister (Czech Republic) R Voráčová	6	5	[10]
(Indonesia) B Gumulya (Indonesia) J Rompies	2	7	[4]
(Romania) A Bogdan (Slovakia) C Škamlová	6	5	[7]
2	(Switzerland) T Bacsinszky (Luxembourg) M Minella	2	7	[10]

Final
1	(Sweden) C Lister (Czech Republic) R Voráčová	6	6^{3}	[4]
2	(Switzerland) T Bacsinszky (Luxembourg) M Minella	0	7^{7}	[10]
