= 2021 Bol Open =

- Date: 7–12 June
- Edition: 15th
- Category: WTA 125K series
- Prize money: $115,000
- Surface: Clay
- Location: Bol, Croatia
- Venue: Bluesun Tennis Center Zlatni rat

Champions

Singles
- (Italy) Jasmine Paolini

Doubles
- (Spain) Aliona Bolsova / (Poland) Katarzyna Kawa
← 2019 ·	Bol Open	· 2022 →

The 2021 Bol Open was a professional tennis tournament played on outdoor clay courts. It was the fifteenth edition of the tournament and part of the 2021 WTA 125K series. The tournament could not be held in 2020 due to the COVID-19 pandemic. It took place in Bol, Croatia, from 7 to 12 June 2021.

== Singles main draw entrants ==
=== Seeds ===
Country	Player	Rank^{1}	Seed
RUS	Anna Blinkova	77	1
NED	Arantxa Rus	83	2
ITA	Jasmine Paolini	91	3
ITA	Martina Trevisan	97	4
ITA	Sara Errani	105	5
RUS	Ludmilla Samsonova	106	6
ESP	Aliona Bolsova	107	7
HUN	Tímea Babos	111	8

- ^{1} Rankings as of 31 May 2021.

=== Other entrants ===
The following players received a wildcard into the singles main draw:

- (Croatia) Jana Fett
- (Croatia) Ana Konjuh
- (Croatia) Tena Lukas
- (Croatia) Tereza Mrdeža

The following players received entry using protected rankings:

- (Romania) Alexandra Dulgheru
- (Australia) Priscilla Hon

The following players entered the singles main draw through qualification:

- (Romania) Alexandra Cadanțu
- (Hungary) Dalma Gálfi
- (Georgia (country)) Ekaterine Gorgodze
- (Switzerland) Lulu Sun

=== Withdrawals ===
Before the tournament

- (Canada) Eugenie Bouchard → replaced by (Belgium) Ysaline Bonaventure
- (Italy) Elisabetta Cocciaretto → replaced by (Romania) Irina Bara
- (Russia) Varvara Gracheva → replaced by (Mexico) Renata Zarazúa
- (Russia) Anna Kalinskaya → replaced by (Belarus) Olga Govortsova
- (Montenegro) Danka Kovinić → replaced by (Australia) Priscilla Hon
- (United States) Bernarda Pera → replaced by (United States) Usue Maitane Arconada
- (Sweden) Rebecca Peterson → replaced by (Ukraine) Katarina Zavatska
- (Spain) Sara Sorribes Tormo → replaced by (Poland) Katarzyna Kawa
- (Romania) Patricia Maria Țig → replaced by (Austria) Barbara Haas
- (China) Zhu Lin → replaced by (United States) Claire Liu
- (Slovenia) Tamara Zidanšek → replaced by (Spain) Nuria Párrizas Díaz

=== Retirements ===
- (Belgium) Greet Minnen
- (Ukraine) Katarina Zavatska

== Doubles entrants ==
=== Seeds ===
Country	Player	Country	Player	Rank^{1}	Seed
SVK	Viktória Kužmová	NED	Arantxa Rus	98	1
JPN	Miyu Kato	CZE	Renata Voráčová	143	2
POL	Katarzyna Piter	NED	Rosalie van der Hoek	227	3
KAZ	Anna Danilina	BLR	Lidziya Marozava	247	4

- ^{1} Rankings as of 31 May 2021.

== Champions ==
=== Singles ===
- (Italy) Jasmine Paolini def. (Netherlands) Arantxa Rus 6–2, 7–6^{(7–4)}

=== Doubles ===
- (Spain) Aliona Bolsova / (Poland) Katarzyna Kawa def. (Georgia (country)) Ekaterine Gorgodze / (Slovakia) Tereza Mihalíková 6–1, 4–6, [10–6]
