= 1996 "M" Electronika Cup =

- Date: 29 April – 5 May
- Edition: 3rd
- Category: Tier IV
- Draw: 32S / 16D
- Prize money: $107,500
- Surface: Clay / outdoor
- Location: Bol, Croatia

Champions

Singles
- (Italy) Gloria Pizzichini

Doubles
- (Argentina) Laura Montalvo / (Argentina) Paola Suárez
← 1995 ·	Croatian Bol Ladies Open	· 1997 →

The 1996 "M" Electronika Cup was a women's tennis tournament played on outdoor clay courts in Bol in Croatia that was part of the Tier IV category of the 1996 WTA Tour. It was the third edition of the tournament and was held from 29 April until 5 May 1996. Unseeded Gloria Pizzichini won the singles title.

== Finals ==
=== Singles ===
(Italy) Gloria Pizzichini defeated (Croatia) Silvija Talaja 6–0, 6–2

- It was Pizzichini's only singles title of her career.

=== Doubles ===
(Argentina) Laura Montalvo / (Argentina) Paola Suárez defeated (France) Alexia Dechaume-Balleret / (France) Alexandra Fusai 6–7, 6–3, 6–4

- It was Montalvo's only title doubles of the year and the 1st of her career. It was Suárez's only doubles title of the year and the 1st of her career.
