= 2021 Bol Open – Doubles =

Doubles
- 2021 Bol Open

Final
- Champions: (Spain) Aliona Bolsova (Poland) Katarzyna Kawa
- Runners-up: (Georgia (country)) Ekaterine Gorgodze (Slovakia) Tereza Mihalíková
- Score: 6–1, 4–6, [10–6]

Events
Singles	Doubles
← 2019 ·	Bol Open	· 2022 →

Timea Bacsinszky and Mandy Minella were the defending champions, having won the previous edition in 2019, but chose not to participate.

Aliona Bolsova and Katarzyna Kawa won the title, defeating Ekaterine Gorgodze and Tereza Mihalíková in the final, 6–1, 4–6, [10–6].

== Seeds ==
1. (Slovakia) Viktória Kužmová / (Netherlands) Arantxa Rus (semifinals)
2. (Japan) Miyu Kato / (Czech Republic) Renata Voráčová (first round)
3. (Poland) Katarzyna Piter / (Netherlands) Rosalie van der Hoek (first round)
4. (Kazakhstan) Anna Danilina / (Belarus) Lidziya Marozava (first round)

== Draw ==
=== Key ===
- Q = Qualifier
- WC = Wild card
- LL = Lucky loser
- Alt = Alternate
- SE = Special exempt
- PR = Protected ranking
- ITF = ITF entry
- JE = Junior exempt
- w/o = Walkover
- r = Retired
- d = Defaulted
- SR = Special ranking

=== Draw ===
First round
1	(Slovakia) V Kužmová (Netherlands) A Rus	6	6
(Croatia) J Fett (Australia) P Hon	2	1
(United States) UM Arconada (Belarus) O Govortsova	6	6
(Romania) M Bulgaru (Romania) A Cadanțu	4	3
3	(Poland) K Piter (Netherlands) R van der Hoek	1	3
(Georgia (country)) E Gorgodze (Slovakia) T Mihalíková	6	6
(Slovakia) AK Schmiedlová (Ukraine) K Zavatska	7^{7}	4	[10]
(Hungary) D Gálfi (Belgium) K Zimmermann	6^{5}	6	[5]
(Spain) A Bolsova (Poland) K Kawa	6	6
(Russia) N Dzalamidze (Poland) P Kania-Choduń	3	4
(Austria) B Haas (Mexico) R Zarazúa	6	3	[13]
4	(Kazakhstan) A Danilina (Belarus) L Marozava	1	6	[11]
(Croatia) T Lukas (Croatia) T Mrdeža	2	5
(Uzbekistan) A Amanmuradova (Romania) A Dulgheru	6	7
(Spain) L Arruabarrena (Italy) S Errani	6	6
2	(Japan) M Kato (Czech Republic) R Voráčová	2	2

Quarterfinals
1	(Slovakia) V Kužmová (Netherlands) A Rus	4	6	[11]
(United States) UM Arconada (Belarus) O Govortsova	6	0	[9]
(Georgia (country)) E Gorgodze (Slovakia) T Mihalíková	w/o
(Slovakia) AK Schmiedlová (Ukraine) K Zavatska
(Spain) A Bolsova (Poland) K Kawa	6	7^{7}
(Austria) B Haas (Mexico) R Zarazúa	4	6^{4}
(Uzbekistan) A Amanmuradova (Romania) A Dulgheru	2	6	[7]
(Spain) L Arruabarrena (Italy) S Errani	6	4	[10]

Semifinals
1	(Slovakia) V Kužmová (Netherlands) A Rus	7	3	[7]
(Georgia (country)) E Gorgodze (Slovakia) T Mihalíková	5	6	[10]
(Spain) A Bolsova (Poland) K Kawa	6	6^{3}	[10]
(Spain) L Arruabarrena (Italy) S Errani	4	7^{7}	[8]

Final
(Georgia (country)) E Gorgodze (Slovakia) T Mihalíková	1	6	[6]
(Spain) A Bolsova (Poland) K Kawa	6	4	[10]
