= 2021 Bol Open – Singles =

Singles
- 2021 Bol Open

Final
- Champion: (Italy) Jasmine Paolini
- Runner-up: (Netherlands) Arantxa Rus
- Score: 6–2, 7–6^{(7–4)}

Events
Singles	Doubles
← 2019 ·	Bol Open	· 2022 →

Tamara Zidanšek was the two-time defending champion, having won the last edition in 2019, however she was unable to defend her title as she was still competing at the 2021 French Open, reaching the semi-final of the Grand Slam.

Jasmine Paolini won the title, defeating Arantxa Rus in the final, 6–2, 7–6^{(7–4)}.

== Seeds ==
1. (Russia) Anna Blinkova (semifinals)
2. (Netherlands) Arantxa Rus (final)
3. (Italy) Jasmine Paolini (champion)
4. (Italy) Martina Trevisan (quarterfinals)
5. (Italy) Sara Errani (second round)
6. (Russia) Liudmila Samsonova (second round)
7. (Spain) Aliona Bolsova (first round)
8. (Hungary) Tímea Babos (first round)

== Draw ==
=== Key ===
- Q = Qualifier
- WC = Wild card
- LL = Lucky loser
- Alt = Alternate
- SE = Special exempt
- PR = Protected ranking
- ITF = ITF entry
- JE = Junior exempt
- w/o = Walkover
- r = Retired
- d = Defaulted
- SR = Special ranking

=== Finals ===
Semifinals
1	(Russia) Anna Blinkova	2	2
3	(Italy) Jasmine Paolini	6	6
(Romania) Irina Bara	2	1
2	(Netherlands) Arantxa Rus	6	6

Final
3	(Italy) Jasmine Paolini	6	7^{7}
2	(Netherlands) Arantxa Rus	2	6^{4}

=== Top half ===
First round
1	(Russia) A Blinkova	3	6	6
PR	(Australia) P Hon	6	0	1
(United States) UM Arconada	7^{7}	3	2
Q	(Romania) A Cadanțu	6^{1}	6	6
PR	(Romania) A Dulgheru	4	4
(Austria) B Haas	6	6
WC	(Croatia) A Konjuh	6	6^{3}	4
6	(Russia) L Samsonova	1	7^{7}	6
3	(Italy) J Paolini	6	6
(Slovakia) V Kužmová	4	1
Q	(Switzerland) L Sun	3	6^{7}
(Belarus) O Govortsova	6	7^{9}
(Spain) N Párrizas Díaz	6	5	3
(Slovakia) K Kučová	4	7	6
WC	(Croatia) T Mrdeža	6	6
8	(Hungary) T Babos	1	2

Second round
1	(Russia) A Blinkova	6	6
Q	(Romania) A Cadanțu	2	1
(Austria) B Haas	6	6
6	(Russia) L Samsonova	3	4
3	(Italy) J Paolini	6	4	6
(Belarus) O Govortsova	1	6	3
(Slovakia) K Kučová	3	6	6
WC	(Croatia) T Mrdeža	6	4	3

Quarterfinals
1	(Russia) A Blinkova	6	4	7
(Austria) B Haas	4	6	5
3	(Italy) J Paolini	6	6
(Slovakia) K Kučová	1	1

Semifinals
1	(Russia) A Blinkova	2	2
3	(Italy) J Paolini	6	6

=== Bottom half ===
First round
7	(Spain) A Bolsova	4	2
WC	(Croatia) T Lukas	6	6
(Poland) K Kawa	4	6	5
(Romania) I Bara	6	4	7
(Belgium) G Minnen	2	1^{r}
(Slovakia) AK Schmiedlová	6	3
(Mexico) R Zarazúa	2	0
4	(Italy) M Trevisan	6	6
5	(Italy) S Errani	6	6
WC	(Croatia) J Fett	3	3
Q	(Georgia (country)) E Gorgodze	6	3	4
(United States) C Liu	4	6	6
Q	(Hungary) D Gálfi	2	3
(Ukraine) K Zavatska	6	6
(Belgium) Y Bonaventure	3	3
2	(Netherlands) A Rus	6	6

Second round
WC	(Croatia) T Lukas	3	0
(Romania) I Bara	6	6
(Slovakia) AK Schmiedlová	4	1
4	(Italy) M Trevisan	6	6
5	(Italy) S Errani	7^{7}	5	6^{1}
(United States) C Liu	6^{3}	7	7^{7}
(Ukraine) K Zavatska	1	0^{r}
2	(Netherlands) A Rus	6	2

Quarterfinals
(Romania) I Bara	2	7	6
4	(Italy) M Trevisan	6	5	0
(United States) C Liu	6	5	4
2	(Netherlands) A Rus	1	7	6

Semifinals
(Romania) I Bara	2	1
2	(Netherlands) A Rus	6	6

== Qualifying ==
=== Seeds ===
1. (Spain) Lara Arruabarrena (qualifying competition)
2. (United States) Asia Muhammad (qualifying competition)
3. (United States) Whitney Osuigwe (qualifying competition)
4. (Georgia (country)) Ekaterine Gorgodze (qualified)

=== Qualifiers ===
1. (Romania) Alexandra Cadanțu
2. (Hungary) Dalma Gálfi
3. (Switzerland) Lulu Sun
4. (Georgia (country)) Ekaterine Gorgodze

=== Draw ===
==== First qualifier ====
Qualifying competition
1	(Spain) Lara Arruabarrena	0	5
	(Romania) Alexandra Cadanțu	6	7

==== Second qualifier ====
Qualifying competition
2	(United States) Asia Muhammad	6	1	2
	(Hungary) Dalma Gálfi	3	6	6

==== Third qualifier ====
Qualifying competition
3	(United States) Whitney Osuigwe	6	2	4
WC	(Switzerland) Lulu Sun	3	6	6

==== Fourth qualifier ====
Qualifying competition
4	(Georgia (country)) Ekaterine Gorgodze	6	6
WC	(Switzerland) Ayline Samardžić	0	0
