= 2019 Bol Open – Singles =

Singles
- 2019 Bol Open

Final
- Champion: (Slovenia) Tamara Zidanšek
- Runner-up: (Spain) Sara Sorribes Tormo
- Score: 7–5, 7–5

Events
Singles	Doubles
← 2018 ·	Bol Open	· 2021 →

Tamara Zidanšek was the defending champion, and successfully defended her title, defeating Sara Sorribes Tormo in the final, 7–5, 7–5.

== Seeds ==
1. (Slovenia) Tamara Zidanšek (champion)
2. (Spain) Sara Sorribes Tormo (final)
3. (Serbia) Aleksandra Krunić (quarterfinals)
4. (Slovakia) Anna Karolína Schmiedlová (semifinals)
5. (Australia) Astra Sharma (second round)
6. (Switzerland) Jil Teichmann (quarterfinals)
7. (Switzerland) Timea Bacsinszky (quarterfinals)
8. (Germany) Laura Siegemund (quarterfinals)

== Draw ==
=== Key ===
- Q = Qualifier
- WC = Wild card
- LL = Lucky loser
- Alt = Alternate
- SE = Special exempt
- PR = Protected ranking
- ITF = ITF entry
- JE = Junior exempt
- w/o = Walkover
- r = Retired
- d = Defaulted
- SR = Special ranking

=== Finals ===
Semifinals
1	(Slovenia) Tamara Zidanšek	2	7	7
(Slovenia) Kaja Juvan	6	5	5
4	(Slovakia) Anna Karolína Schmiedlová	4	0
2	(Spain) Sara Sorribes Tormo	6	6

Final
1	(Slovenia) Tamara Zidanšek	7	7
2	(Spain) Sara Sorribes Tormo	5	5

=== Top half ===
First round
1	(Slovenia) T Zidanšek	7	6
(Luxembourg) M Minella	5	2
WC	(Croatia) J Fett	2	2
(Switzerland) S Vögele	6	6
(Ukraine) V Strakhova	3	4
(Japan) N Hibino	6	6
PR	(United States) A Tatishvili	2	2
7	(Switzerland) T Bacsinszky	6	6
3	(Serbia) A Krunić	7^{7}	6
(Serbia) O Danilović	6^{0}	2
(Romania) A Bogdan	6	6
WC	(Serbia) M Đaković	1	3
(Slovenia) K Juvan	6	6
(Slovenia) D Jakupović	2	0
WC	(Kazakhstan) A Danilina	6	2	5
5	(Australia) A Sharma	4	6	7

Second round
1	(Slovenia) T Zidanšek	3	6	6
(Switzerland) S Vögele	6	2	3
(Japan) N Hibino	2	4
7	(Switzerland) T Bacsinszky	6	6
3	(Serbia) A Krunić	6	6
(Romania) A Bogdan	2	1
(Slovenia) K Juvan	6	6
5	(Australia) A Sharma	1	0

Quarterfinals
1	(Slovenia) T Zidanšek	7^{7}	6
7	(Switzerland) T Bacsinszky	6^{5}	4
3	(Serbia) A Krunić	5	3
(Slovenia) K Juvan	7	6

Semifinals
1	(Slovenia) T Zidanšek	2	7	7
(Slovenia) K Juvan	6	5	5

=== Bottom half ===
First round
6	(Switzerland) J Teichmann	6	6
(Romania) I-C Begu	3	1
(Belgium) Y Bonaventure	6	6
(Spain) P Badosa	3	2
PR	(Germany) A-L Friedsam	6	6
WC	(Croatia) L Bošković	4	4
(Netherlands) B Schoofs	1	1
4	(Slovakia) AK Schmiedlová	6	6
8	(Germany) L Siegemund	6	6
(Croatia) T Lukas	2	2
PR	(Czech Republic) D Allertová	1	0
(Croatia) T Mrdeža	6	6
(Georgia (country)) E Gorgodze	3	5
(Russia) V Flink	6	7
(Brazil) B Haddad Maia	3	4
2	(Spain) S Sorribes Tormo	6	6

Second round
6	(Switzerland) J Teichmann	6	6
(Belgium) Y Bonaventure	2	2
PR	(Germany) A-L Friedsam	6	0	6^{6}
4	(Slovakia) AK Schmiedlová	4	6	7^{8}
8	(Germany) L Siegemund	3	7^{7}	6
(Croatia) T Mrdeža	6	6^{5}	1
(Russia) V Flink	3	2
2	(Spain) S Sorribes Tormo	6	6

Quarterfinals
6	(Switzerland) J Teichmann	3	4
4	(Slovakia) AK Schmiedlová	6	6
8	(Germany) L Siegemund	1	0
2	(Spain) S Sorribes Tormo	6	6

Semifinals
4	(Slovakia) AK Schmiedlová	4	0
2	(Spain) S Sorribes Tormo	6	6
