= 2018 Bol Open – Doubles =

Doubles
- 2018 Bol Open

Final
- Champions: (Colombia) Mariana Duque Mariño (China) Wang Yafan
- Runners-up: (Spain) Sílvia Soler Espinosa (Czech Republic) Barbora Štefková
- Score: 6–3, 7–5

Events
Singles	Doubles
← 2017 ·	Bol Open	· 2019 →

Chuang Chia-jung and Renata Voráčová were the defending champions, however Chuang chose not to participate. Voráčová partnered Xenia Knoll but lost in the quarterfinals to Ysaline Bonaventure and Sara Sorribes Tormo.

Mariana Duque Mariño and Wang Yafan won the title after defeating Sílvia Soler Espinosa and Barbora Štefková 6–3, 7–5 in the final.

== Seeds ==
1. (Switzerland) Xenia Knoll / (Czech Republic) Renata Voráčová (quarterfinals)
2. (United States) Kaitlyn Christian / (United States) Sabrina Santamaria (semifinals)
3. (Croatia) Darija Jurak / (Sweden) Cornelia Lister (first round)
4. (Colombia) Mariana Duque Mariño / (China) Wang Yafan (champions)

== Draw ==
=== Key ===
- Q = Qualifier
- WC = Wild card
- LL = Lucky loser
- Alt = Alternate
- SE = Special exempt
- PR = Protected ranking
- ITF = ITF entry
- JE = Junior exempt
- w/o = Walkover
- r = Retired
- d = Defaulted
- SR = Special ranking

=== Draw ===
First round
1	(Switzerland) X Knoll (Czech Republic) R Voráčová	6	6
(Romania) E-G Ruse (India) P Thombare	2	2
(Australia) N Bains (Japan) R Fujiwara	3	2
(Belgium) Y Bonaventure (Spain) S Sorribes Tormo	6	6
4	(Colombia) M Duque Mariño (China) Y Wang	6	7^{7}
WC	(Ukraine) A Kalinina (Ukraine) M Kostyuk	4	6^{3}
(Switzerland) V Golubic (Montenegro) D Kovinić	0	6	[6]
(Croatia) T Lukas (Slovenia) T Zidanšek	6	4	[10]
(Slovakia) M Hončová (Czech Republic) T Martincová	6	6
(Russia) N Dzalamidze (Kazakhstan) G Voskoboeva	4	2
(Spain) S Soler Espinosa (Czech Republic) B Štefková	6	6
3	(Croatia) D Jurak (Sweden) C Lister	1	4
(Russia) A Fomina (Argentina) M Irigoyen	4	3
(Russia) A Komardina (Luxembourg) M Minella	6	6
(Bosnia and Herzegovina) A Husarić (Finland) E Laine	2	7	[6]
2	(United States) K Christian (United States) S Santamaria	6	5	[10]

Quarterfinals
1	(Switzerland) X Knoll (Czech Republic) R Voráčová	6^{3}	3
(Belgium) Y Bonaventure (Spain) S Sorribes Tormo	7^{7}	6
4	(Colombia) M Duque Mariño (China) Y Wang	6	6
(Croatia) T Lukas (Slovenia) T Zidanšek	4	4
(Slovakia) M Hončová (Czech Republic) T Martincová	2	1
(Spain) S Soler Espinosa (Czech Republic) B Štefková	6	6
(Russia) A Komardina (Luxembourg) M Minella	4	6	[0]
2	(United States) K Christian (United States) S Santamaria	6	1	[10]

Semifinals
(Belgium) Y Bonaventure (Spain) S Sorribes Tormo	4	6^{1}
4	(Colombia) M Duque Mariño (China) Y Wang	6	7^{7}
(Spain) S Soler Espinosa (Czech Republic) B Štefková	6	6^{5}	[10]
2	(United States) K Christian (United States) S Santamaria	2	7^{7}	[5]

Final
4	(Colombia) M Duque Mariño (China) Y Wang	6	7
(Spain) S Soler Espinosa (Czech Republic) B Štefková	3	5
