= Tanja Hauschildt =

German tennis player

- Country (sports): Germany
- Born: 28 December 1972 (age 52)
- Prize money: $34,664

Singles
- Highest ranking: No. 207 (24 February 1992)

Tanja Hauschildt (born 28 December 1972) is a German former professional tennis player.

On 24 February 1992, Gustmane reached her best singles ranking of world number 207. On 22 March 1993, she peaked at world number 208 in the doubles rankings. Her only WTA Tour main-draw appearance came at the 1991 Croatian Lottery Cup Hauschildt, where she came through qualifying to make the main draw. She was defeated by Austrian Sandra Dopfer in straight sets in the first round.

== ITF finals ==
$25,000 tournaments
$10,000 tournaments

=== Singles (0–1) ===
Result	No.	Date	Tournament	Surface	Opponent	Score
Loss	1.	26 February 1990	Wigan, United Kingdom	Hard	(France) Agnès Zugasti	6–1, 3–6, 3–6

=== Doubles (2–1) ===
Result	No.	Date	Tournament	Surface	Partner	Opponents	Score
Win	1.	27 November 1989	Budapest, Hungary	Carpet (i)	(Soviet Union) Agnese Gustmane	(United Kingdom) Alexandra Niepel (West Germany) Caroline Schneider	6–3, 1–6, 6–1
Win	2.	6 August 1990	Paderborn, West Germany	Clay	(West Germany) Heike Thoms	(Greece) Julia Apostoli (Soviet Union) Anna Mirza	6–3, 6–1
Loss	1.	10 September 1990	Eastbourne, United Kingdom	Clay	(Belgium) Els Callens	(Sweden) Maria Lindström (United States) Heather Ludloff	6–7^{(6)}, 1–6
