= 1999 Egger Tennis Festival – Singles =

Singles
- 1999 Egger Tennis Festival

Final
- Champion: (Slovakia) Karina Habšudová
- Runner-up: (Croatia) Silvija Talaja
- Score: 2–6, 6–4, 6–4

Details
- Draw: 32
- Seeds: 8

Events
Singles	Doubles
- Egger Tennis Festival

The 1999 Egger Tennis Festival singles was the singles event of the 29th edition of the Egger Tennis Festival; a Tier IV tournament and the second most prestigious women's tennis event held in Austria. Patty Schnyder, the defending champion, was upset in the first round by qualifier Lenka Němečková.

Karina Habšudová defeated in the final Silvija Talaja, in three sets, to win her first WTA title after three finals.

== Seeds ==
1. (Switzerland) Patty Schnyder (first round)
2. (Italy) Silvia Farina (quarterfinals)
3. (Slovakia) Henrieta Nagyová (semifinals)
4. (Austria) Sylvia Plischke (first round)
5. (Germany) Anke Huber (quarterfinals)
6. (Spain) Magüi Serna (second round)
7. (France) Sarah Pitkowski (first round)
8. (Israel) Anna Smashnova (second round)

== Draw ==
Key

- Q = Qualifier
- WC = Wild card
- LL = Lucky loser
- Alt = Alternate
- ITF = ITF entry
- PR = Protected ranking
- SR = Special ranking
- SE = Special exempt
- JE = Junior exempt
- JR = Junior Accelerator Programme entrant
- CO = College Accelerator Programme entrant
- NG = Next Gen Accelerator Program entrant
- w/o = Walkover
- r = Retired
- d = Defaulted

=== Finals ===
Semifinals
(Slovakia) Karina Habšudová	6	6
3	(Slovakia) Henrieta Nagyová	2	4
Q	(Czech Republic) Adriana Gerši	6	5	4
(Croatia) Silvija Talaja	3	7	6

Final
(Slovakia) Karina Habšudová	2	6	6
(Croatia) Silvija Talaja	6	4	4

=== Top half ===
First round
1	(Switzerland) P Schnyder	3	6	4
Q	(Czech Republic) L Němečková	6	3	6
WC	(China) Li F	3	4
(Slovakia) K Habšudová	6	6
(Russia) T Panova	0	0
(Bulgaria) M Maleeva	6	6
LL	(Germany) M Weingärtner	3	3
5	(Germany) A Huber	6	6
3	(Slovakia) H Nagyová	6^{4}	6	6
(France) A Dechaume-Balleret	7^{7}	3	2
(South Africa) J Kruger	4	6	6
WC	(Austria) P Wartusch	6	2	2
(Spain) V Ruano Pascual	6	1	7^{7}
(Belarus) O Barabanschikova	2	6	6^{3}
(Switzerland) E Gagliardi	6	6
7	(France) S Pitkowski	1	1

Second round
Q	(Czech Republic) L Němečková	6	1	1
(Slovakia) K Habšudová	4	6	6
(Bulgaria) M Maleeva	6	4	3
5	(Germany) A Huber	3	6	6
3	(Slovakia) H Nagyová	6^{5}	6	6
(South Africa) J Kruger	7^{7}	3	2
(Spain) V Ruano Pascual	3	3
(Switzerland) E Gagliardi	6	6

Quarterfinals
(Slovakia) K Habšudová	6	6
5	(Germany) A Huber	4	2
3	(Slovakia) H Nagyová	6	6
(Switzerland) E Gagliardi	2	2

Semifinals
(Slovakia) K Habšudová	6	6
3	(Slovakia) H Nagyová	2	4

=== Bottom half ===
First round
6	(Spain) M Serna	6	6
(France) A Cocheteux	4	3
(Czech Republic) D Chládková	6	4	1
Q	(Czech Republic) A Gerši	4	6	6
Q	(Hungary) A Földényi	6	6
WC	(Austria) M Maruska	2	4
(Argentina) P Suárez	6	6
4	(Austria) S Plischke	0	1
8	(Israel) A Smashnova	6	7^{7}
(Austria) B Schwartz	4	6^{3}
(Croatia) S Talaja	6	6
Q	(Spain) Á Montolio	3	2
(Spain) G León García	6^{5}	2
(Spain) M Sánchez Lorenzo	7^{7}	6
(Spain) C Torrens Valero	3	2
2	(Italy) S Farina	6	6

Second round
6	(Spain) M Serna	4	3
Q	(Czech Republic) A Gerši	6	6
Q	(Hungary) A Földényi	6	6^{4}	6
(Argentina) P Suárez	2	7^{7}	3
8	(Israel) A Smashnova	6^{7}	0
(Croatia) S Talaja	7^{9}	6
(Spain) M Sánchez Lorenzo	5	7	6^{5}
2	(Italy) S Farina	7	5	7^{7}

Quarterfinals
Q	(Czech Republic) A Gerši	2	6	6
Q	(Hungary) A Földényi	6	3	2
(Croatia) S Talaja	4	6	6
2	(Italy) S Farina	6	1	3

Semifinals
Q	(Czech Republic) A Gerši	6	5	4
(Croatia) S Talaja	3	7	6

== Qualifying ==
=== Seeds ===
1. (Hungary) Rita Kuti-Kis (first round)
2. (Germany) Marlene Weingärtner (qualifying competition, lucky loser)
3. (Germany) Elena Wagner (first round)
4. (France) Émilie Loit (second round)
5. (Sweden) Åsa Carlsson (first round)
6. (Bulgaria) Lubomira Bacheva (qualifying competition)
7. (Slovakia) Ľudmila Cervanová (second round)
8. (Russia) Elena Dementieva (first round)

=== Qualifiers ===
1. (Spain) Ángeles Montolio
2. (Czech Republic) Adriana Gerši
3. (Hungary) Anna Földényi
4. (Czech Republic) Lenka Němečková

== Qualifying draw ==
Key

- Q = Qualifier
- WC = Wild card
- LL = Lucky loser
- Alt = Alternate
- ITF = ITF entry
- PR = Protected ranking
- SR = Special ranking
- SE = Special exempt
- JE = Junior exempt
- JR = Junior Accelerator Programme entrant
- CO = College Accelerator Programme entrant
- NG = Next Gen Accelerator Program entrant
- w/o = Walkover
- r = Retired
- d = Defaulted

=== First qualifier ===
First round
1	(Hungary) Rita Kuti-Kis	2	2
(Spain) Ángeles Montolio	6	6
Alt	(Czech Republic) Eva Martincová	2	6	6
WC	(Austria) Nicole Remis	6	1	1
(Germany) Veronika Martinek	6	7
(Spain) Gisela Riera	3	6
(Austria) Evelyn Fauth	4	3
7	(Slovakia) Ľudmila Cervanová	6	6

Second round
(Spain) Ángeles Montolio	6	6
Alt	(Czech Republic) Eva Martincová	4	2
(Germany) Veronika Martinek	7	6
7	(Slovakia) Ľudmila Cervanová	6	2

Qualifying competition
(Spain) Ángeles Montolio	6	6
(Germany) Veronika Martinek	2	4

=== Second qualifier ===
First round
4	(France) Émilie Loit	6	6
WC	(Austria) Bettina Auer	0	2
(Czech Republic) Adriana Gerši	6	6
(Hungary) Katalin Marosi	4	3
(United States) Samantha Reeves	2	7	6
(Switzerland) Miroslava Vavrinec	6	5	4
WC	(Austria) Bettina Resch	4	1
6	(Bulgaria) Lubomira Bacheva	6	6

Second round
4	(France) Émilie Loit	5	0^{r}
(Czech Republic) Adriana Gerši	7	1
(United States) Samantha Reeves	3	2
6	(Bulgaria) Lubomira Bacheva	6	6

Qualifying competition
(Czech Republic) Adriana Gerši	6	6
6	(Bulgaria) Lubomira Bacheva	0	4

=== Third qualifier ===
First round
8	(Russia) Elena Dementieva	6	6	2
(Slovakia) Katarína Studeníková	1	7	6
(Hungary) Anna Földényi	2	6	6
(Slovakia) Janette Husárová	6	1	3
(Spain) Mariam Ramon Climent	6	7
(Germany) Anca Barna	2	6
(Slovenia) Tina Pisnik	7	6
3	(Germany) Elena Wagner	6	4

Second round
(Slovakia) Katarína Studeníková	5	0^{r}
(Hungary) Anna Földényi	7	1
(Spain) Mariam Ramon Climent	5	6	7
(Slovenia) Tina Pisnik	7	4	6

Qualifying competition
(Hungary) Anna Földényi	6	6
(Spain) Mariam Ramon Climent	1	4

=== Fourth qualifier ===
First round
5	(Sweden) Åsa Carlsson	3	2
(Czech Republic) Lenka Němečková	6	6
WC	(Austria) Sybille Bammer	6	1
(Croatia) Jelena Kostanić Tošić	7	6
(Canada) Sonya Jeyaseelan	6	6
(Austria) Sandra Dopfer	1	2
(Germany) Petra Begerow	6	2	5
2	(Germany) Marlene Weingärtner	0	6	7

Second round
(Czech Republic) Lenka Němečková	3	7	6
(Croatia) Jelena Kostanić Tošić	6	5	1
(Canada) Sonya Jeyaseelan	6	3	4
2	(Germany) Marlene Weingärtner	1	6	6

Qualifying competition
(Czech Republic) Lenka Němečková	6	6
2	(Germany) Marlene Weingärtner	2	0
