= 1991 Croatian Lottery Cup – Doubles =

Doubles
- 1991 Croatian Lottery Cup

Final
- Champions: (Italy) Laura Golarsa (Bulgaria) Magdalena Maleeva
- Runners-up: (Italy) Sandra Cecchini (Italy) Laura Garrone
- Score: Walkover

Details
- Draw: 16 (1WC/1Q)
- Seeds: 4

Events
Singles	Doubles
Croatian Bol Ladies Open	· 1995 →

In the inaugural edition of the tournament, Laura Golarsa and Magdalena Maleeva won the title after the match against Sandra Cecchini and Laura Garrone was cancelled due to a walkover.

== Seeds ==
1. (Italy) Sandra Cecchini / (Italy) Laura Garrone (final, withdrew)
2. (Canada) Helen Kelesi / (Czechoslovakia) Andrea Strnadová (semifinals)
3. (Italy) Laura Golarsa / (Bulgaria) Magdalena Maleeva (champions)
4. (Czechoslovakia) Ivana Jankovská / (Czechoslovakia) Eva Melicharová (first round)

== Draw ==
=== Key ===
- Q = Qualifier
- WC = Wild card
- LL = Lucky loser
- Alt = Alternate
- SE = Special exempt
- PR = Protected ranking
- ITF = ITF entry
- JE = Junior exempt
- w/o = Walkover
- r = Retired
- d = Defaulted
- SR = Special ranking

=== Draw ===
First round
1	(Italy) S Cecchini (Italy) L Garrone	6	6
(Uruguay) P Miller (Germany) C Schneider	1	1
WC	(Hungary) A Földényi (Croatia) M Palaveršić	0	0
(Mexico) L Novelo (United Kingdom) S Smith	6	6
4	(Czechoslovakia) I Jankovská (Czechoslovakia) E Melicharová	5	2
(Austria) H Sprung (France) S Testud	7	6
(Canada) R Simpson-Alter (Netherlands) H ter Riet	6	3	6
(Germany) S Meier (Austria) B Reinstadler	3	6	3
(Italy) Antonella Canapi (Italy) C Salvi	0	7^{7}	7
Q	(Germany) V Martinek (Germany) A Popp	6	6^{5}	5
(Czechoslovakia) R Bobková (Czechoslovakia) H Vildová	3	7	3
3	(Italy) L Golarsa (Bulgaria) M Maleeva	6	5	6
(Czechoslovakia) P Holubová (Czechoslovakia) Sylvia Podlahova	6	6^{3}	6
(Brazil) L Corsato (Finland) N Dahlman	2	7^{7}	0
(Soviet Union) E Maniokova (Finland) P Thorén	3	6^{5}
2	(Canada) H Kelesi (Czechoslovakia) A Strnadová	6	7^{7}

Quarterfinals
1	(Italy) S Cecchini (Italy) L Garrone	6	6
(Mexico) L Novelo (United Kingdom) S Smith	0	4
(Austria) H Sprung (France) S Testud	5	5
(Canada) R Simpson-Alter (Netherlands) H ter Riet	7	7
(Italy) Antonella Canapi (Italy) C Salvi	2	4
3	(Italy) L Golarsa (Bulgaria) M Maleeva	6	6
(Czechoslovakia) P Holubová (Czechoslovakia) Sylvia Podlahova	4	3
2	(Canada) H Kelesi (Czechoslovakia) A Strnadová	6	6

Semifinals
1	(Italy) S Cecchini (Italy) L Garrone	6	6
(Canada) R Simpson-Alter (Netherlands) H ter Riet	2	2
3	(Italy) L Golarsa (Bulgaria) M Maleeva	6	1	6
2	(Canada) H Kelesi (Czechoslovakia) A Strnadová	3	6	4

Final
1	(Italy) S Cecchini (Italy) L Garrone
3	(Italy) L Golarsa (Bulgaria) M Maleeva	w/o
