= Karina Habšudová =

Slovak tennis player

- Country (sports): Czechoslovakia (1989–92); Slovakia (1993–2003)
- Residence: Bratislava, Slovakia
- Born: 2 August 1973 (age 53) Bojnice, Czechoslovakia
- Height: 1.70 m (5 ft 7 in)
- Turned pro: 1989
- Retired: 2003
- Plays: Right-handed (two-handed backhand)
- Prize money: US$1,878,228

Singles
- Career record: 304–226
- Career titles: 1
- Highest ranking: No. 10 (10 February 1997)

Grand Slam singles results
- Australian Open: 4R (1991, 1995, 1997)
- French Open: QF (1996)
- Wimbledon: 2R (1991, 1999, 2000)
- US Open: 4R (1996, 1997)

Other tournaments
- Olympic Games: 3R (1996, 2000)

Doubles
- Career record: 155–171
- Career titles: 6
- Highest ranking: No. 32 (28 May 2001)

Grand Slam doubles results
- Australian Open: 3R (1995, 1997)
- French Open: QF (1998)
- Wimbledon: 3R (1993, 2001)
- US Open: 3R (1992, 1999)

Other doubles tournaments
- Olympic Games: 2R (2000)

Grand Slam mixed doubles results
- Australian Open: 2R (2000)
- French Open: QF (2001)
- Wimbledon: SF (2001)
- US Open: QF (2000)

Karina Habšudová (Slovak pronunciation: [ˈkarina ˈɦapʂudɔʋaː]; born 2 August 1973) is a Slovak former professional tennis player. She has been ranked as high as 10 in the world (1997). Together with Karol Kučera, she won the Hopman Cup in 1998. Her best performance at a Grand Slam tournament came when she got to the quarterfinals of the 1996 French Open, defeating Kristin Godridge, Nathalie Tauziat, Martina Hingis, and Anke Huber before losing to Arantxa Sánchez Vicario, 8–10 in the third set.

She also had a successful junior career. She won the girls' singles at the 1991 US Open, and was junior No. 1 for some time.

== Biography ==
Born in Bojnice, Czechoslovakia, Habšudová originally trained as a gymnast but at the age of ten, she switched to tennis under the encouragement of her mother, herself a former amateur tennis player. By the age of fourteen, she had already become the top junior player in Czechoslovakia. In 1990, she was crowned ITF Junior World Champion, and the following year she won the girls' singles title at the US Open.

As a professional, she made the fourth round of the 1991 Australian Open while still a schoolgirl, but her early promise was curtailed by health problems and injuries, including a bout of pneumonia in 1993 and an ankle injury the following year. After suffering another injury just as she had made it to the top 30 in the spring of 1995, she bounced back to enjoy her most successful year in 1996, where she had results such as reaching the final of the German Open and the quarterfinals of the French Open. At the latter event, she beat Martina Hingis and Anke Huber and served for a place in the semifinals against Arantxa Sánchez Vicario, but ultimately lost 8–10 in the third set.

Habšudová eventually broke the top 10 in early 1997, after reaching the final of the Generali Ladies Linz, becoming the first woman representing Slovakia to do so. Though she continued to play on the tour until 2003, she never again matched the same success of her breakthrough season, with later highlights including winning the Hopman Cup in 1998 and her only WTA singles title at the Austrian Open in 1999. In 2001, she reached the semifinals of the Wimbledon mixed doubles tournament partnering David Rikl.

Following her retirement, she worked for several years as a sports editor. She married her husband Milan Cílek in 2003 and they have three children together.

== WTA Tour finals ==
=== Singles: 5 (1 title, 4 runner-ups) ===
Legend
Tier I (0)
Tier II (0)
Tier III (0)
Tier IV & V (1)

Titles by surface
Hard	0
Clay	1
Grass	0
Carpet	0

Result	No.	Date	Tournament	Surface	Opponent	Score
Loss	1.	May 1996	German Open	Clay	(Germany) Steffi Graf	6–4, 2–6, 5–7
Loss	2.	Oct 1996	Luxembourg Open	Carpet (i)	(Germany) Anke Huber	3–6, 0–6
Loss	3.	Feb 1997	Linz Open, Austria	Carpet (i)	(United States) Chanda Rubin	4–6, 2–6
Win	1.	Jul 1999	Pörtschach, Austria	Clay	(Croatia) Silvija Talaja	2–6, 6–4, 6–4
Loss	4.	Jul 1999	Sopot Open, Poland	Clay	(Spain) Conchita Martínez	1–6, 1–6

=== Doubles: 12 (6 titles, 6 runner-ups) ===
Legend
Tier I (1)
Tier II (0)
Tier III (2)
Tier IV & V (3)

Titles by surface
Hard	1
Clay	5
Grass	0
Carpet	0

Result	No.	Date	Tournament	Surface	Partner	Opponents	Score
Loss	1.	May 1992	European Open, Switzerland	Clay	(United States) Marianne Werdel	(United States) Amy Frazier (South Africa) Elna Reinach	5–7, 2–6
Loss	2.	Jul 1994	Austrian Open	Clay	(France) Alexandra Fusai	(Italy) Sandra Cecchini (Argentina) Patricia Tarabini	5–7, 5–7
Win	1.	Sep 1996	Czech Open	Clay	(Czech Republic) Helena Suková	(Czech Republic) Eva Martincová (Bulgaria) Elena Pampoulova	3–6, 6–3, 6–2
Loss	3.	Jun 1997	Rosmalen Open, Netherlands	Grass	(Argentina) Florencia Labat	(Czech Republic) Eva Melicharová (Czech Republic) Helena Vildová	3–6, 6–7^{(6–8)}
Win	2.	Jul 1997	Prague Open, Czech Republic	Clay	(Romania) Ruxandra Dragomir	(Czech Republic) Eva Martincová (Czech Republic) Helena Vildová	6–1, 5–7, 6–2
Win	3.	Jul 1998	Prague Open, Czech Republic	Clay	(Italy) Silvia Farina	(Czech Republic) Květa Hrdličková (Czech Republic) Michaela Paštiková	2–6, 6–1, 6–2
Win	4.	Jul 1998	Warsaw Open, Poland	Clay	(Ukraine) Olga Lugina	(South Africa) Liezel Horn (Austria) Karin Kschwendt	7–6^{(7–2)}, 7–5
Win	5.	Jul 1999	Pörtschach, Austria	Clay	(Italy) Silvia Farina	(Ukraine) Olga Lugina (Argentina) Laura Montalvo	6–4, 6–4
Loss	4.	Feb 2000	Hanover Grand Prix, Germany	Hard (i)	(Italy) Silvia Farina	(Sweden) Åsa Carlsson (Belarus) Natalia Zvereva	3–6, 4–6
Loss	5.	Jun 2000	Rosmalen Open, Netherlands	Grass	(Australia) Catherine Barclay	(United States) Erika deLone (Australia) Nicole Pratt	6–7^{(4–7)}, 3–4 ret.
Win	6.	Oct 2000	Bratislava Open, Slovakia	Hard (i)	(Slovakia) Daniela Hantuchová	(Hungary) Petra Mandula (Austria) Patricia Wartusch	w/o
Loss	6.	Feb 2001	Dubai Championships, United Arab Emirates	Hard	(Sweden) Åsa Carlsson	(Indonesia) Yayuk Basuki (Netherlands) Caroline Vis	0–6, 6–4, 2–6

== ITF Circuit finals ==
Legend
$75,000 tournaments
$50,000 tournaments
$25,000 tournaments
$10,000 tournaments

=== Singles: 11 (6–5) ===
Result	No.	Date	Tournament	Surface	Opponent	Score
Win	1.	27 November 1989	ITF Budapest, Hungary	Carpet (i)	(Hungary) Nóra Köves	6–4, 6–1
Loss	2.	26 March 1990	Open de Limoges, France	Carpet (i)	(France) Pascale Paradis-Mangon	4–6, 4–6
Loss	3.	23 April 1990	ITF Sutton, United Kingdom	Clay	(Czechoslovakia) Radka Bobková	6–3, 5–7, 6–7
Loss	4.	7 May 1990	ITF Swansea, United Kingdom	Clay	(Czechoslovakia) Radka Bobková	5–7, 5–7
Win	5.	21 May 1990	ITF Katowice, Poland	Clay	(Hungary) Anna Földényi	6–3, 6–2
Loss	6.	13 August 1990	ITF Karlovy Vary, Czechoslovakia	Clay	(Czechoslovakia) Andrea Strnadová	3–6, 4–6
Win	7.	12 December 1994	ITF Přerov, Czech Republic	Hard (i)	(Slovakia) Henrieta Nagyová	6–1, 6–4
Win	8.	27 February 1995	ITF Prostějov, Czech Republic	Hard (i)	(Switzerland) Martina Hingis	7–5, 6–4
Win	9.	27 January 1997	ITF Prostějov, Czech Republic	Carpet (i)	(Austria) Barbara Paulus	6–7^{(4)}, 6–1, 6–3
Win	10.	7 December 1998	ITF Bad Gögging, Germany	Carpet (i)	(Germany) Marlene Weingärtner	7–6^{(3)}, 6–2
Loss	11.	11 June 2001	Open de Marseille, France	Clay	(Czech Republic) Klára Koukalová	4–6, 6–4, 6–7^{(3)}

=== Doubles: 3 (3–0) ===
Result	No.	Date	Tournament	Surface	Partner	Opponents	Score
Win	1.	15 July 1991	ITF Karlovy Vary, Czechoslovakia	Clay	(Czechoslovakia) Radka Bobková	(Czechoslovakia) Kateřina Šišková (Czechoslovakia) Markéta Štusková	6–1, 6–3
Win	2.	22 July 1991	ITF Schwarzach, Austria	Clay	(Czechoslovakia) Katarína Studeníková	(Latvia) Agnese Gustmane (Austria) Heidi Sprung	6–3, 6–1
Win	3.	13 September 1993	ITF Karlovy Vary, Czech Republic	Clay	(Latvia) Larisa Neiland	(Czech Republic) Radka Bobková (Czech Republic) Petra Langrová	6–3, 6–4

== Head-to-head record against top 10 players ==
Players who have been ranked world No. 1 are in boldface.

- Dominique Monami 4–1
- Nadia Petrova 0–2
- **Venus Williams** 0–1
- **Martina Hingis** 4–3
- Elena Dementieva 0–3
- **Steffi Graf** 0–4
- **Monica Seles** 0–2
- **Justine Henin** 0–1
- **Arantxa Sánchez Vicario** 1–6
- Patty Schnyder 1–3
- Ai Sugiyama 1–2
- **Amélie Mauresmo** 0–1
- Conchita Martínez 2–6
- **Kim Clijsters** 1–0
