= 1995 Croatian Ladies Open – Doubles =

Doubles
- 1995 Croatian Ladies Open

Final
- Champions: (Argentina) Mercedes Paz; (Canada) Rene Simpson
- Runners-up: (Italy) Laura Golarsa; (Romania) Irina Spîrlea
- Score: 7–5, 6–2

Details
- Draw: 16
- Seeds: 4

Events
Singles	Doubles
← 1991 ·	Zagreb Open	· 1996 →

Mercedes Paz and Rene Simpson won in the final 7–5, 6–2 against Laura Golarsa and Irina Spîrlea.

== Seeds ==
Champion seeds are indicated in bold text while text in italics indicates the round in which those seeds were eliminated.

1. (Italy) Laura Golarsa / (Romania) Irina Spîrlea (final)
2. (Argentina) **Mercedes Paz** / (Canada) **Rene Simpson (champions)**
3. (Italy) Sandra Cecchini / (France) Isabelle Demongeot (quarterfinals)
4. (Finland) Nanne Dahlman / (Italy) Laura Garrone (first round)

== Draw ==
=== Key ===
- Q = Qualifier
- WC = Wild card
- LL = Lucky loser
- Alt = Alternate
- SE = Special exempt
- PR = Protected ranking
- ITF = ITF entry
- JE = Junior exempt
- w/o = Walkover
- r = Retired
- d = Defaulted
- SR = Special ranking

First round

Quarterfinals

Semifinals

Final

1
- (Italy) **L Golarsa**
- (Romania) **I Spîrlea**
**6**
6
**6**

- (Czech Republic) L Richterová
- (Ukraine) E Tatarkova
2
**7**
1

1
- (Italy) **L Golarsa**
- (Romania) **I Spîrlea**
**6**
**7**

- (Ecuador) MD Campana
- (Spain) C Torrens Valero
3
1

- (Slovakia) D Szabova
- (France) N van Lottum
1
5

- (Slovakia) **D Szabova**
- (France) **N van Lottum**
**6**
**6**

1
- (Italy) **L Golarsa**
- (Romania) **I Spîrlea**
**6**
**6**

3
- (Italy) **S Cecchini**
- (France) **I Demongeot**
**6**
**6**

WC
- (United States) S Cacic
- (Greece) C Papadáki
4
2

- (Czech Republic) M Kratochvílová
- (Croatia) M Palaveršić
0
1

3
- (Italy) S Cecchini
- (France) I Demongeot
4
2

WC
- (United States) **S Cacic**
- (Greece) **C Papadáki**
**6**
**6**

WC
- (United States) **S Cacic**
- (Greece) **C Papadáki**
**6**
**6**

- (Italy) S Attili
- (Italy) E Savoldi
1
2

1
- (Italy) Laura Golarsa
- (Romania) Irina Spîrlea
5
2

- (United Kingdom) E Bond
- (United Kingdom) J Moore
4
1

- (Argentina) **Mercedes Paz**
- (Canada) **Rene Simpson**
**7**
**6**

Q
- (Netherlands) **Y Basting**
- (Netherlands) **K de Weille**
**6**
**6**

Q
- (Netherlands) **Y Basting**
- (Netherlands) **K de Weille**
**7**
**6**

- (Czech Republic) **K Kroupová**
- (Czech Republic) **P Langrová**
5
**6**
**6**

- (Czech Republic) K Kroupová
- (Czech Republic) P Langrová
**6**
**7**

4
- (Finland) N Dahlman
- (Italy) L Garrone
**7**
3
2

Q
- (Netherlands) Y Basting
- (Netherlands) K de Weille
5
3

- (Germany) **B Rittner**
- (Germany) **C Schneider**
**6**
**6**

2
- (Argentina) **M Paz**
- (Canada) **R Simpson**
**7**
**6**

- (France) L Ghirardi
- (France) S Pitkowski
4
2

- (Germany) B Rittner
- (Germany) C Schneider
6
1

- (Slovenia) T Križan
- (Germany) S Meier
3
0

2
- (Argentina) **M Paz**
- (Canada) **R Simpson**
**7**
**6**

2
- (Argentina) **M Paz**
- (Canada) **R Simpson**
**6**
**6**
