= Barbora Štefková =

Czech tennis player

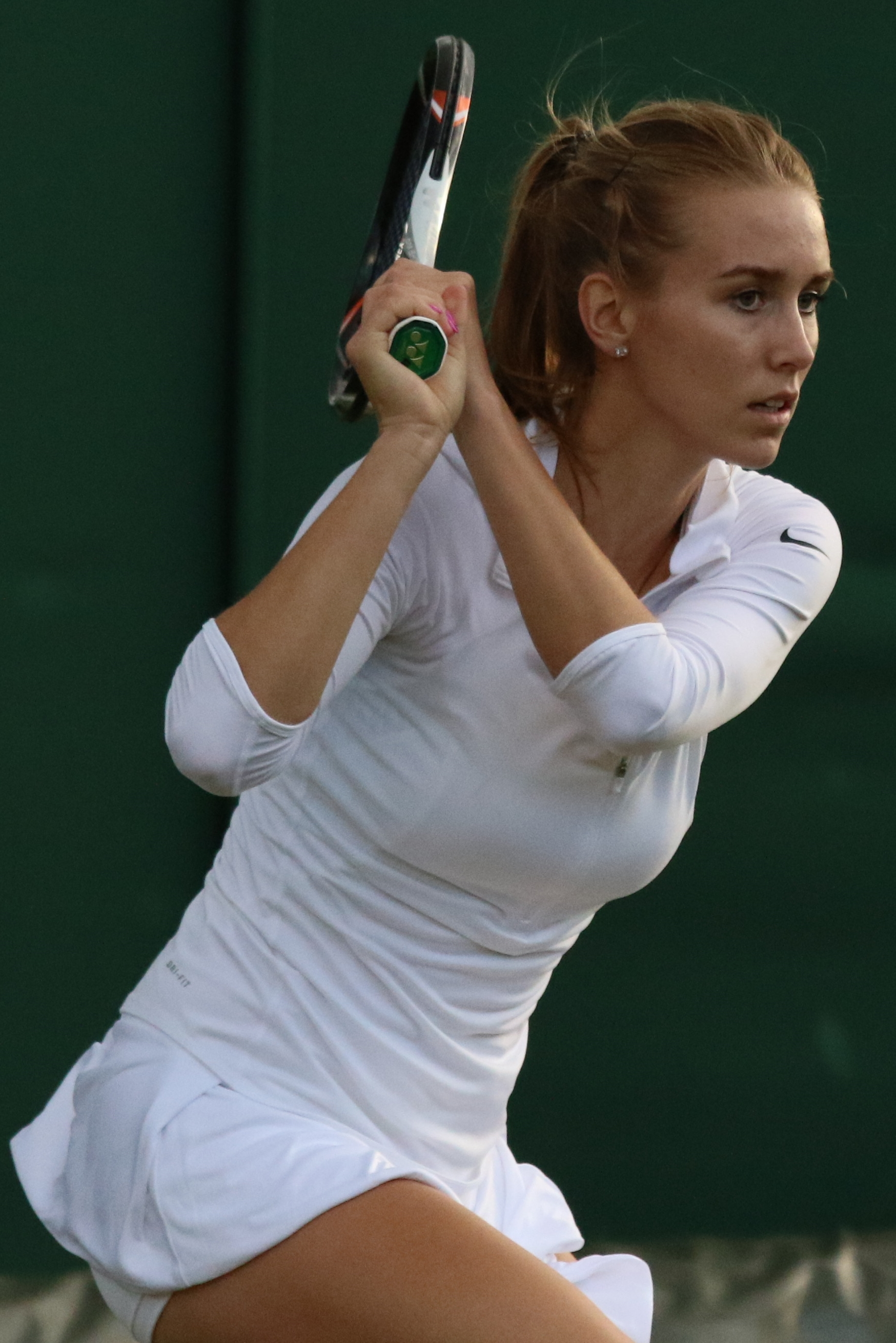
- Wimbledon qualifying 2016
- Country (sports): Czech Republic
- Residence: Břuchotín, Czech Republic
- Born: 4 April 1995 (age 31) Olomouc, Czech Republic
- Height: 1.74 m (5 ft 9 in)
- Turned pro: 2011
- Retired: June 2019
- Plays: Right-handed (two-handed backhand)
- Coach: Sylva Štefková
- Prize money: US$ 226,047

Singles
- Career record: 174–122
- Career titles: 9 ITF
- Highest ranking: No. 154 (27 February 2017)

Grand Slam singles results
- Australian Open: Q2 (2017)
- French Open: Q2 (2016)
- Wimbledon: 1R (2018)
- US Open: Q1 (2016)

Doubles
- Career record: 107–69
- Career titles: 12 ITF
- Highest ranking: No. 100 (14 January 2019)

Barbora Štefková (née Hlavicová; born 4 April 1995) is a Czech former tennis player.

Due to reactive arthritis, she retired from professional tennis in June 2019.

== Career ==
Štefková reached a career-high singles ranking of world No. 154 in 2017. In 2016, she made her first WTA Tour main-draw appearance at the Tournoi de Québec, where she defeated Annika Beck.

In March 2017, pain in both wrists forced Štefková to stop competing for almost an entire season. She reached consecutive doubles finals at the Bol Open and Mallorca Open in June 2018, partnering Sílvia Soler Espinosa and Lucie Šafářová, respectively. In Mallorca, Šafářová and Štefková finished runners-up to Andreja Klepač and María José Martínez Sánchez.

Štefková qualified for her first Grand Slam main draw at Wimbledon. She won all three qualifying matches, defeating Emma Raducanu, Veronika Kudermetova and Conny Perrin. In the first round, she lost to 20th seed Kiki Bertens, 6–3, 6–2.

== Performance timelines ==
Only main-draw results in WTA Tour, Grand Slam tournaments, Fed Cup and Olympic Games are included in win–loss records.

=== Singles ===
Tournament	2016	2017	2018	2019	SR	W–L
Grand Slam tournaments
Australian Open	A	Q2	Q1	A	0 / 0	0–0
French Open	Q2	A	A	A	0 / 0	0–0
Wimbledon	Q3	A	1R	A	0 / 1	0–1
US Open	Q1	A	A	A	0 / 0	0–0
Win–loss	0–0	0–0	0–1	0–0	0 / 1	0–0
Career statistics
Tournaments	1	2	1	0	Career total: 4	
Overall win–loss	1–1	0–2	0–1	0–0	0 / 4	1–4
Year-end ranking (Note: 2013: WTA ranking–726, 2014: WTA ranking–441, 2015: WTA ranking–290, ... 2020: WTA ranking–868, 2021: WTA ranking–1196.)	162	452	301	435	$226,047	

=== Doubles ===
Tournament	2016	2017	2018	2019	SR	W–L
Grand Slam tournaments
Australian Open	A	A	A	A	0 / 0	0–0
French Open	A	A	A	A	0 / 0	0–0
Wimbledon	A	A	A	A	0 / 0	0–0
US Open	A	A	A	A	0 / 0	0–0
Win–loss	0–0	0–0	0–0	0–0	0 / 0	0–0
Career statistics
Tournaments	2	0	6	3	Career total: 11	
Titles	0	0	0	0	Career total: 0	
Finals	0	0	1	0	Career total: 1	
Overall win–loss	1–2	0–0	6–5	1–3	0 / 11	8–10
Year-end ranking (Note: 2013: WTA ranking–840, 2014: WTA ranking–416, 2015: WTA ranking–544, ... 2020: WTA ranking–619.)	220	420	103	422		

Key
W	F	SF	QF	#R	RR	Q#	P#	DNQ	A	Z#	PO	G	S	B	NMS	NTI	P	NH

(W) winner; (F) finalist; (SF) semifinalist; (QF) quarterfinalist; (#R) rounds 4, 3, 2, 1; (RR) round-robin stage; (Q#) qualification round; (P#) preliminary round; (DNQ) did not qualify; (A) absent; (Z#) Davis/Fed Cup Zonal Group (with number indication) or (PO) play-off; (G) gold, (S) silver or (B) bronze Olympic/Paralympic medal; (NMS) not a Masters tournament; (NTI) not a Tier I tournament; (P) postponed; (NH) not held; (SR) strike rate (events won / competed); (W–L) win–loss record.
To avoid confusion and double counting, these charts are updated at the conclusion of a tournament or when the player's participation has ended.

== WTA Tour finals ==
=== Doubles: 1 (runner-up) ===
Legend Grand Slam WTA 1000 WTA 500 WTA 250 (0–1)	Finals by surface Hard (0–0) Grass (0–1) Clay (0–0) Carpet (0–0)

Result	Date	Tournament	Surface	Partner	Opponents	Score
Loss	Jun 2018	Mallorca Open, Spain	Grass	(Czech Republic) Lucie Šafářová	(Slovenia) Andreja Klepač (Spain) María José Martínez Sánchez	1–6, 6–3, [3–10]

== WTA Challenger finals ==
=== Doubles: 2 (2 runner-ups) ===
Result	Date	Tournament	Surface	Partner	Opponents	Score
Loss	Jun 2018	Bol Open, Croatia	Clay	(Spain) Sílvia Soler Espinosa	(Colombia) Mariana Duque-Mariño (China) Wang Yafan	3–6, 5–7
Loss	Nov 2018	Mumbai Open, India	Hard	(Netherlands) Bibiane Schoofs	(Russia) Natela Dzalamidze (Russia) Veronika Kudermetova	4–6, 6–7^{(4–7)}

== ITF Circuit finals ==
=== Singles: 13 (9 titles, 4 runner–ups) ===
Legend
$50,000 tournaments
$25,000 tournaments
$10,000 tournaments

Result	W–L	Date	Tournament	Tier	Surface	Opponent	Score
Win	1–0	Aug 2013	ITF Caslano, Switzerland	10,000	Clay	(Switzerland) Chiara Grimm	6–3, 6–1
Win	2–0	May 2014	ITF Ramla, Israel	10,000	Hard	(Russia) Margarita Lazareva	6–1, 6–3
Win	3–0	May 2014	ITF Netanya, Israel	10,000	Hard	(Israel) Saray Sterenbach	7–6^{(7–4)}, 6–3
Win	4–0	Jun 2014	ITF Banja Luka, Bosnia and Herzegovina	10,000	Clay	(Romania) Daiana Negreanu	6–2, 6–2
Loss	4–1	Aug 2014	ITF Brčko, Bosnia and Herzegovina	10,000	Clay	(Czech Republic) Gabriela Pantůčková	7–6^{(7–5)}, 6–7^{(6–8)}, 3–6
Win	5–1	Dec 2014	ITF Tel Aviv, Israel	10,000	Hard	(Israel) Deniz Khazaniuk	6–2, 6–0
Win	6–1	Jun 2015	ITF Andijan, Uzbekistan	25,000	Hard	(Russia) Veronika Kudermetova	7–5, 6–3
Win	7–1	Nov 2015	ITF Tel Aviv, Israel	10,000	Hard	(Russia) Olga Doroshina	6–1, 6–4
Loss	7–2	Mar 2016	ITF Mildura, Australia	25,000	Grass	(Russia) Anastasia Pivovarova	4–6, 6–4, 5–7
Win	8–2	Apr 2016	Lale Cup Istanbul, Turkey	50,000	Hard	(Russia) Anastasia Pivovarova	7–5, 2–6, 6–1
Win	9–2	Jun 2016	ITF Namangan, Uzbekistan	25,000	Hard	(Russia) Ksenia Lykina	7–5, 7–5
Loss	9–3	Aug 2018	ITF Nonthaburi, Thailand	25,000	Hard	(China) Wang Xiyu	3–6, 5–7
Loss	9–4	Jan 2019	ITF Hong Kong	25,000	Hard	(Ukraine) Daria Lopatetska	4–6, 2–6

=== Doubles: 17 (12 titles, 5 runner–ups) ===
Legend
$50/60,000 tournaments
$25,000 tournaments
$10/15,000 tournaments

Result	W–L	Date	Tournament	Tier	Surface	Partner	Opponents	Score
Loss	0–1	Aug 2013	ITF Caslano, Switzerland	10,000	Clay	(Switzerland) Sara Ottomano	(Switzerland) Chiara Grimm (Switzerland) Jil Teichmann	4–6, 6–4, [4–10]
Loss	0–2	Sep 2013	ITF Antalya, Turkey	10,000	Clay	(Thailand) Kamonwan Buayam	(Germany) Lena-Marie Hofmann (Germany) Anna Klasen	2–6, 2–6
Win	1–2	May 2014	ITF Ramla, Israel	10,000	Hard	(Russia) Margarita Lazareva	(Russia) Sofia Dmitrieva (United States) Alexandra Morozova	6–2, 3–6, [11–9]
Win	2–2	May 2014	ITF Netanya, Israel	10,000	Hard	(Austria) Pia König	(Georgia (country)) Mariam Bolkvadze (Russia) Anastasia Pribylova	6–3, 6–2
Win	3–2	Jun 2014	ITF Banja Luka, BiH	10,000	Clay	(Czech Republic) Gabriela Pantůčková	(Bosnia and Herzegovina) Anita Husarić (Romania) Daiana Negreanu	w/o
Win	4–2	Jun 2014	ITF Přerov, Czech Republic	15,000	Clay	(Slovakia) Chantal Škamlová	(Czech Republic) Eva Rutarová (Czech Republic) Karolína Stuchlá	6–4, 6–3
Win	5–2	Jul 2014	ITF Horb, Germany	10,000	Clay	(Sweden) Hilda Melander	(Germany) Carolin Daniels (Germany) Laura Schaeder	6–4, 6–1
Loss	5–3	Aug 2014	ITF Zaječar, Serbia	10,000	Clay	(Australia) Alexandra Nancarrow	(Ukraine) Elizaveta Ianchuk (Serbia) Natalija Kostić	3–6, 5–7
Loss	5–4	Nov 2015	ITF Ramat Gan, Israel	10,000	Hard	(United States) Alexandra Morozova	(Russia) Olga Doroshina (Israel) Vlada Ekshibarova	2–6, 2–6
Win	6–4	Dec 2015	ITF Ramat Gan, Israel	10,000	Hard	(United States) Alexandra Morozova	(Israel) Vlada Ekshibarova (Russia) Daria Lodikova	6–2, 7–5
Win	7–4	Apr 2016	Lale Cup, Turkey	50,000	Hard	(Uzbekistan) Nigina Abduraimova	(Russia) Valentyna Ivakhnenko (Belarus) Lidziya Marozava	6–4, 1–6, [10–6]
Win	8–4	May 2016	ITF Andijan, Uzbekistan	25,000	Hard	(Ukraine) Anastasiya Vasylyeva	(Russia) Victoria Kan (Uzbekistan) Sabina Sharipova	6–3, 4–6, [10–7]
Win	9–4	Feb 2017	Burnie International, Australia	60,000	Hard	(Japan) Riko Sawayanagi	(Australia) Alison Bai (Thailand) Varatchaya Wongteanchai	7–6^{(8–6)}, 4–6, [10–7]
Win	10–4	Mar 2018	ITF Sharm El Sheikh, Egypt	15,000	Hard	(Georgia (country)) Mariam Bolkvadze	(Colombia) María Paulina Pérez (Colombia) Paula Andrea Pérez	6–2, 7–6^{(8–6)}
Loss	10–5	Aug 2018	ITF Nonthaburi, Thailand	25,000	Hard	(Australia) Naiktha Bains	(India) Rutuja Bhosale (India) Pranjala Yadlapalli	6–2, 0–6, [6–10]
Win	11–5	Oct 2018	ITF Cherbourg-en-Cotentin, France	25,000	Hard (i)	(Poland) Katarzyna Piter	(United Kingdom) Alicia Barnett (United Kingdom) Eden Silva	6–2, 6–1
Win	12–5	Jan 2019	ITF Hong Kong	25,000	Hard	(Netherlands) Michaëlla Krajicek	(Chinese Taipei) Chen Pei-hsuan (Chinese Taipei) Wu Fang-hsien	6–4, 6–7^{(3–7)}, [12–10]
