= Mirela Vladulescu =

German tennis player

- Native name: Mirela Vlădulescu
- Country (sports): Germany
- Born: 11 March 1977 (age 48) Romania
- Plays: Right-handed
- Prize money: $22,271

Singles
- Career record: 68–75
- Highest ranking: No. 263 (8 July 1996)

Doubles
- Career record: 3–7
- Highest ranking: No. 702 (8 July 1996)

Mirela Vladulescu (Romanian: Vlădulescu; born 11 March 1977) is a German former professional tennis player.

Born in Romania, Vladulescu was trained in Germany by Boris Breskvar, who coached both Boris Becker and Steffi Graf. While competing on the professional tour she reached a career high singles world ranking of 263. Her only WTA Tour main draw appearance came at the 1996 Bol Open in Croatia, where she had a qualifying win over Bettina Fulco en route to the main draw, then lost in the first round to Veronika Martinek.

From 1997 to 2001 she played collegiate tennis for the University of Alabama, Birmingham (UAB). In 1998 she was the ITA National Rookie of the Year and became the first women's tennis player from UAB to reach the singles quarter-finals of the NCAA championships. She continues to live in Birmingham and works in the fitness industry.

== ITF finals ==
=== Singles: 1 (0–1) ===
Result	No.	Date	Tournament	Surface	Opponent	Score
Runner-up	1.	14 August 1994	Paderborn, Germany	Clay	(Germany) Martina Pawlik	6–7^{(2)}, 4–6
