= 1991 Croatian Lottery Cup =

- Date: 22–28 April
- Edition: 1st
- Category: Tier V
- Draw: 32S / 16D
- Prize money: $100,000
- Surface: Clay / outdoor
- Location: Bol, Yugoslavia

Champions

Singles
- (Italy) Sandra Cecchini

Doubles
- (Italy) Laura Golarsa / (Bulgaria) Magdalena Maleeva
- Croatian Bol Ladies Open

The 1991 Croatian Lottery Cup, also known as the Croatian Lottery Cup – Bol Ladies Open, was a women's tennis tournament played on outdoor clay courts in Bol, Yugoslavia that was part of Tier V of the 1991 WTA Tour. It was the inaugural edition of the tournament and was held from 22 April through 28 April 1991. Second-seeded Sandra Cecchini won the singles title.

== Finals ==
=== Singles ===
(Italy) Sandra Cecchini defeated (Bulgaria) Magdalena Maleeva 6–4, 3–6, 7–5

- It was Cecchini's only singles title of the year and the 11th of her career.

=== Doubles ===
(Italy) Laura Golarsa / (Bulgaria) Magdalena Maleeva defeated (Italy) Sandra Cecchini / (Italy) Laura Garrone 6–3, 1–6, 6–4

- It was Golarsa's only doubles title of the year and the 2nd of her career. It was Maleeva's only doubles title of the year and 1st of her career.
