= 1995 Croatian Ladies Open – Singles =

Singles
- 1995 Croatian Ladies Open

Final
- Champion: (Belgium) Sabine Appelmans
- Runner-up: (Germany) Silke Meier
- Score: 6–4, 6–3

Details
- Draw: 32
- Seeds: 8

Events
Singles	Doubles
- Zagreb Open

Sabine Appelmans won in the final 6–4, 6–3 against Silke Meier.

== Seeds ==
A champion seed is indicated in bold text while text in italics indicates the round in which that seed was eliminated.

1. (Germany) Sabine Hack (first round)
2. (Romania) Irina Spîrlea (semifinals)
3. (Italy) Sandra Cecchini (second round)
4. (Germany) Barbara Rittner (quarterfinals)
5. (Belgium) **Sabine Appelmans (champion)**
6. (United States) Sandra Cacic (first round)
7. (France) Lea Ghirardi (first round)
8. (Japan) Ai Sugiyama (quarterfinals)

== Draw ==
Key

- Q = Qualifier
- WC = Wild card
- LL = Lucky loser
- Alt = Alternate
- ITF = ITF entry
- PR = Protected ranking
- SR = Special ranking
- SE = Special exempt
- JE = Junior exempt
- JR = Junior Accelerator Programme entrant
- CO = College Accelerator Programme entrant
- NG = Next Gen Accelerator Program entrant
- w/o = Walkover
- r = Retired
- d = Defaulted

First round
1	(Germany) S Hack	2	3
Q	(Slovakia) **D Szabova**	**6**	**6**
(France) **S Pitkowski**	6	**6**	**6**
(France) N van Lottum	**7**	1	3
(Czech Republic) K Kroupová	4	1
(Italy) **L Golarsa**	**6**	**6**
(Spain) **C Torrens Valero**	**6**	**6**
7	(France) L Ghirardi	3	4
3	(Italy) **S Cecchini**	**6**	**6**
(Finland) N Dahlman	3	1
(Germany) **S Meier**	**6**	**7**
Q	(Croatia) S Talaja	3	5
(Netherlands) **K de Weille**	6	**6**	**6**
WC	(Croatia) M Palaveršić	**7**	2	4
(Germany) **M Kochta**	1	**6**	**6**
6	(United States) S Cacic	**6**	4	3
5	(Belgium) **S Appelmans**	**7**	2	**7**
(Slovenia) B Mulej	6	**6**	6
(Czech Republic) **P Langrová**	**6**	**6**
(Netherlands) Y Basting	3	1
(Slovenia) **T Križan**	3	**6**	**6**
(Italy) L Garrone	**6**	3	4
(Moldova) S Komleva	**7**	2	4
4	(Germany) **B Rittner**	5	**6**	**6**
8	(Japan) **A Sugiyama**	**6**	**6**
Q	(Switzerland) E Gagliardi	2	3
(Argentina) **M Paz**	**6**	**6**
(Italy) E Savoldi	4	2
(Czech Republic) **L Richterová**	**7**	1	**6**
WC	(Croatia) M Kovačević	5	**6**	4
Q	(Germany) J Kandarr	1	**6**	2
2	(Romania) **I Spîrlea**	**6**	2	**6**

Second round
Q	(Slovakia) **D Szabova**	**6**	2	**6**
(France) S Pitkowski	4	**6**	2
(Italy) **L Golarsa**	**6**	**6**
(Spain) C Torrens Valero	3	4
3	(Italy) S Cecchini	**7**	4	2
(Germany) **S Meier**	6	**6**	**6**
(Netherlands) K de Weille	3	0
(Germany) **M Kochta**	**6**	**6**
5	(Belgium) **S Appelmans**	**6**	**6**
(Czech Republic) P Langrová	3	4
(Slovenia) T Križan	4	**6**	1
4	(Germany) **B Rittner**	**6**	3	**6**
8	(Japan) **A Sugiyama**	**6**	**6**
(Argentina) M Paz	2	2
(Czech Republic) L Richterová	0	1
2	(Romania) **I Spîrlea**	**6**	**6**

Quarterfinals
Q	(Slovakia) **D Szabova**	2	**6**	**7**
(Italy) L Golarsa	**6**	3	5
(Germany) **S Meier**	**6**	**6**
(Germany) M Kochta	1	0
5	(Belgium) **S Appelmans**	3	**6**	**6**
4	(Germany) B Rittner	**6**	2	4
8	(Japan) A Sugiyama	2	5
2	(Romania) **I Spîrlea**	**6**	**7**

Semifinals
Q	(Slovakia) D Szabova	2	0
(Germany) **S Meier**	**6**	**6**
5	(Belgium) **S Appelmans**	**7**	**7**
2	(Romania) I Spîrlea	5	5

Final
(Germany) Silke Meier	4	3
5	(Belgium) **Sabine Appelmans**	**6**	**6**
