= Gloria Pizzichini =

Italian tennis player (born 1975)

- Country (sports): Italy
- Residence: Osimo Scalo, Italy
- Born: 24 July 1975 (age 50) Osimo Scalo
- Height: 1.53 m (5 ft 0 in)
- Turned pro: 1992
- Retired: 2005
- Plays: Right-handed (two–handed backhand)
- Prize money: $448,056

Singles
- Career record: 212–207
- Career titles: 1 WTA, 6 ITF
- Highest ranking: No. 45 (18 November 1996)

Grand Slam singles results
- Australian Open: 1R (1993, 1997, 1998, 1999, 2002)
- French Open: 3R (1996)
- Wimbledon: 3R (1993)
- US Open: 2R (2000)

Doubles
- Career record: 70–77
- Career titles: 6 ITF
- Highest ranking: No. 90 (22 September 1997)

Grand Slam doubles results
- Australian Open: 1R (1997, 1998, 1999)
- French Open: 3R (1997)
- Wimbledon: 2R (1997)
- US Open: 1R (1995, 1997)

Gloria Pizzichini (born 24 July 1975) is an Italian former tennis player.

On 18 November 1996, she reached her career-high singles ranking of world No. 45. In the same year, she won her only WTA Tour title. In the 1996 "M" Electronika Cup final, she defeated domestic player Silvija Talaja 6–2, 6–0 to collect the trophy. In her career, Pizzichini defeated players such as Julie Halard, Iva Majoli and Ruxandra Dragomir. She was the first player to be beaten by Elena Dementieva in the main draw of a Grand Slam tournament, at the 1999 Australian Open.

== Personal life ==
Born to Enzo and Maria Pizzichini, Gloria began playing tennis aged seven. She has a sister, Francesca, and a brother, Paolo. Pizzichini cited Stefan Edberg as her role model.

== WTA career finals ==
=== Singles: 1 title ===
Legend
Tier I
Tier II
Tier III
Tier IV & V

Result	Date	Tournament	Surface	Opponent	Score
Win	May 1996	Bol Open, Croatia	Clay	(Croatia) Silvija Talaja	6–2, 6–0

== ITF Circuit finals ==
$100,000 tournaments
$75,000 tournaments
$50,000 tournaments
$25,000 tournaments
$10,000 tournaments

=== Singles: 12 (6–6) ===
Result	No.	Date	Tournament	Surface	Opponent	Score
Win	1.	1 April 1991	ITF Bari, Italy	Clay	(Czechoslovakia) Zuzana Witzová	6–2, 6–0
Loss	1.	22 July 1991	ITF Sezze, Italy	Clay	(Italy) Ginevra Mugnaini	3–6, 2–6
Win	2.	7 September 1992	ITF Arzachena, Italy	Clay	(Italy) Linda Ferrando	6–3, 6–4
Win	3.	11 February 1996	ITF Mar del Plata, Argentina	Clay	(France) Amélie Cocheteux	6–2, 6–4
Loss	2.	25 February 1996	ITF Bogotá, Colombia	Clay	(Colombia) Fabiola Zuluaga	4–6, 3–6
Win	4.	27 July 1997	ITF İstanbul, Turkey	Hard	(Netherlands) Seda Noorlander	0–6, 6–4, 7–6
Win	5.	21 March 1999	Urtijëi, Italy	Hard (i)	(Slovakia) Andrea Masaryková	6–2, 6–0
Win	6.	11 April 1999	ITF Cerignola, Italy	Hard	(Germany) Lisa Fritz	7–6^{(3)}, 6–1
Loss	3.	5 September 1999	ITF Spoleto, Italy	Clay	(Germany) Marketa Kochta	2–6, 6–7
Loss	4.	19 September 1999	ITF Bordeaux, France	Clay	(Ukraine) Lubomira Bacheva	6–3, 4–6, 3–6
Loss	5.	26 March 2000	ITF Taranto, Italy	Clay	(Spain) Marta Marrero	4–6, 4–6
Loss	6.	23 July 2000	ITF Fontanafredda, Italy	Clay	(Spain) Eva Bes	4–6, 1–6

=== Doubles: 10 (6–4) ===
Result	No.	Date	Tournament	Surface	Partner	Opponents	Score
Loss	1.	7 August 1989	ITF Erice, Italy	Clay	(Czechoslovakia) Lucie Kořínková	(Italy) Cristina Salvi (Italy) Alessia Vesuvio	6–3, 2–6, 3–6
Win	1.	17 August 1992	ITF Spoleto, Italy	Clay	(Italy) Flora Perfetti	(Austria) Sandra Dopfer (Germany) Maja Živec-Škulj	1–6, 6–2, 6–1
Win	2.	20 March 1995	ITF Castellón, Spain	Clay	(Italy) Sara Ventura	(Slovakia) Zuzana Nemšáková (Slovakia) Tatiana Zelenayová	6–3, 6–3
Loss	2.	17 April 1995	ITF Murcia, Spain	Clay	(Italy) Federica Bonsignori	(Argentina) Mariana Eberle (Argentina) Veronica Stele	5–7, 2–6
Win	3.	3 July 1995	ITF Sezze, Italy	Clay	(Italy) Laura Garrone	(Czech Republic) Lenka Němečková (Germany) Maja Živec-Škulj	7–6, 6–2
Loss	3.	24 July 1995	ITF Valladolid, Spain	Clay	(Italy) Sara Ventura	(Australia) Louise Pleming (Greece) Christína Papadáki	6–1, 2–6, 5–7
Win	4.	28 July 2001	ITF Civitanova, Italy	Clay	(Italy) Antonella Serra Zanetti	(Argentina) Gisela Dulko (United States) Edina Gallovits-Hall	6–3, 3–6, 6–1
Win	5.	15 September 2001	ITF Reggio Calabria, Italy	Clay	(Estonia) Maret Ani	(Argentina) Eugenia Chialvo (Spain) Gisela Riera	w/o
Win	6.	15 June 2002	ITF Grado, Italy	Clay	(Czech Republic) Hana Šromová	(Federal Republic of Yugoslavia) Sandra Načuk (Madagascar) Natacha Randriantefy	6–3, 7–5
Loss	4.	14 May 2005	ITF Casale Monferrato, Italy	Clay	(Hungary) Katalin Marosi	(Brazil) Joana Cortez (Brazil) Roxane Vaisemberg	2–6, 0–6
