= Silvija Talaja =

Croatian tennis player (born 1978)

- Country (sports): Yugoslavia (1991-1992); Croatia (1992–2007)
- Residence: Makarska, Croatia
- Born: 14 January 1978 (age 48) Imotski, SR Croatia, SFR Yugoslavia
- Height: 1.73 m (5 ft 8 in)
- Turned pro: 1992
- Retired: 2006
- Plays: Right-handed (two-handed backhand)
- Prize money: $1,135,876

Singles
- Career record: 300–273
- Career titles: 2 WTA, 1 ITF
- Highest ranking: No. 18 (29 May 2000)

Grand Slam singles results
- Australian Open: 2R (2001)
- French Open: 3R (1999, 2004)
- Wimbledon: 3R (2000)
- US Open: 2R (2001, 2003)

Doubles
- Career record: 69–120
- Career titles: 1 WTA
- Highest ranking: No. 54 (7 June 2004)

Team competitions
- Fed Cup: 12-12

Silvija Talaja (born 14 January 1978) is a Croatian former professional tennis player.

Talaja won two singles titles and one doubles title on the WTA Tour, as well as one singles title on the ITF Circuit. On 29 May 2000, she reached her best singles ranking of world No. 18. In her career, Talaja defeated former world No. 1 players Arantxa Sánchez Vicario, Jennifer Capriati and other top-ten players such as Conchita Martínez, Marion Bartoli, Nadia Petrova, Nathalie Tauziat, Anna Kournikova, Chanda Rubin, Barbara Schett and Irina Spîrlea. A powerful, fast baseline player, her best Grand Slam results were third-round appearances at Roland Garros (twice) and Wimbledon (once). She also won a gold medal at the 1993 Mediterranean Games in doubles.

After 15 seasons on the tour (five of which she finished in the top 100), in 2006, Talaja married her long-time partner and retired from professional tennis.

== Career ==
=== The early years ===
Talaja debuted at the age of 13, representing Yugoslavia at the ITF Belgrade in 1991 but lost in the first round in three tight sets to Cătălina Cristea. She played further ten ITF tournaments in 1992, reaching one quarterfinal and one semifinal, as well as scoring her first top-100 win (defeated Jenny Byrne). In 1993, she qualified for a WTA tournament in Essen where she lost to top seed Sánchez Vicario in the first round. She reached the second round at the WTA Palermo in 1994 and qualified for further three WTA tournaments in 1995 (Zagreb, Palermo and Vienna).

=== First WTA final ===
In March 1996, Talaja won her first ITF title at Makarska and soon after reached her first WTA Tour final at Bol (lost to Gloria Pizzichini). In August, she reached the semifinals of the WTA Vienna (l. to Sandra Cecchini) and quarterfinals at Prague (def. Karina Habšudová, l. to Ruxandra Dragomir). In October the same year, she entered the top 100 for the first time.

In 1997, she debuted at a Grand Slam at the Australian Open (l. to ninth seed Habšudová in 1st round) and reached second round at Roland Garros. She reached the semifinals at Pattaya in 1998 (d. Henrieta Nagyová in the 1st round, l. to Li Fang) but played mostly on the ITF Circuit.

=== Entering top 50 ===
At the 1999 Australian Open, Talaja lost to fifth seed Venus Williams 7–9 in the third set, being two points away from victory. In May, she reached the semifinals at the Warsaw Open and then made it to third round at Roland Garros (d. Chanda Rubin, l. to fourth seed Jana Novotná in three sets). Talaja then reached her second WTA final at s-Hertogenbosch (l. to Kristina Brandi in three sets) and entered top 50 for the first time. The following month she reached another final, this time at WTA Vienna (l. to Habšudová in 3s). The following week, she reached the semifinals at WTA Sopot, again losing to Habšudová. In August, Talaja reached hear third semifinals of the season at WTA Brussels and in November her fourth semifinal at WTA Pattaya. In November 1999, she entered top 30 for the first time. In 1999, Talaja won career-best 32 WTA Tour matches (going 18–9 on clay) and finished the season at No. 29.

=== Winning first WTA tournament ===
In January 2000, Talaja won the WTA Gold Coast, scoring three successive top-20 victories along the way (Anna Kournikova in quarterfinal, Sánchez Vicario in semifinal and C. Martinez in final). At the German Open in Berlin, she lost to Martina Hingis in the third round, after having two set points in the first set. In May, Talaja won her second WTA tournament of the year at the WTA Strasbourg (def. 7th ranked Nathalie Tauziat in QF, Nathalie Dechy in SF and Rita Kuti-Kis in F). The following week, her ranking rose to her career-high at No. 18. Later that year, Talaja reached the third round at Wimbledon (def. Irina Spîrlea and Mirjana Lučić-Baroni, l. to Hingis). In August, she reached the third round at the Du Maurier Open (def. Barbara Schett in the first round, her 6th top-20 victory of the year), but apart from the Sydney Olympics, failed to reach a second round at a tournament for the rest of the year. She finished her most successful season ranked at No. 30.

=== Injuries and come-back ===
At the 2001 Australian Open, Talaja defeated Alicia Molik 6–0, 6–0 but lost to Amanda Coetzer in the second round. She reached just one quarterfinal (at Gold Coast) and one semifinal (Porto) during the entire season (13 first-round losses). Struggling with injuries, Talaja dropped out of top 100 by the end of the year.

She started the 2002 season by reaching the semifinals at the Auckland Open (having gone through qualifications). She reached another semifinal at the Warsaw Open in May, and reached the finals of WTA Tokyo (def. 19th ranked Ai Sugiyama but l. to Jill Craybas after leading 4–0 in the third set). She finished the season at No. 75, having also reached quarterfinals at the WTA events in Pattaya and Memphis and the second round at Indian Wells and Scottsdale.

2003 was the final top-100 season of Talaja's career. She reached the quarterfinals four times (at Hyderabad, Bol, Estoril and Nordic Open where she def. 17th ranked Patty Schnyder) and second round seven times, including at Indian Wells, Miami, Roland Garros and US Open. Her year-end ranking was No. 93.

=== Final years of her career ===
In 2004, Talaja reached quarterfinals just once (Korea Open) and played in the third round of the Pacific Open at Indian Wells (going through qualifying, ret. to Fabiola Zuluaga, and at the French Open (l. to Serena Williams). In 2005, Talaja reached the second round of a WTA tournament three times (including Pacific Open) and finished her season at No. 200. She played just three tournaments in 2006 (losing all three matches in 1st round) and retired at the end of the year. In November 2007, she made a short come-back, playing at the $25k in Ismaning, Germany, but lost in the first round.

== WTA career finals ==
=== Singles: 6 (2 titles, 4 runner-ups) ===
Result	W/L	Date	Tournament	Surface	Opponent	Score
Loss	0–1	May 1996	Bol, Croatia	Clay	(Italy) Gloria Pizzichini	2–6, 0–6
Loss	0–2	Jun 1999	Rosmalen, Netherlands	Grass	(Puerto Rico) Kristina Brandi	0–6, 6–3, 1–6
Loss	0–3	Jul 1999	Pörtschach, Austria	Clay	(Slovakia) Karina Habšudová	6–2, 4–6, 4–6
Win	1–3	Jan 2000	Gold Coast, Australia	Hard	(Spain) Conchita Martínez	6–0, 0–6, 6–4
Win	2–3	May 2000	Strasbourg, France	Clay	(Hungary) Rita Kuti-Kis	7–5, 4–6, 6–3
Loss	2–4	Oct 2002	Tokyo, Japan	Hard	(United States) Jill Craybas	6–2, 4–6, 4–6

=== Doubles: 4 (1 title, 3 runner-ups) ===
Result	W/L	Date	Tournament	Surface	Partner	Opponents	Score
Loss	0–1	May 2002	Warsaw, Poland	Clay	(Russia) Evgenia Kulikovskaya	(Slovakia) Henrieta Nagyová (Croatia) Jelena Kostanić Tošić	1–6, 1–6
Win	1–1	Jul 2003	Warsaw, Poland	Clay	(Ukraine) Tatiana Perebiynis	(Estonia) Maret Ani (Czech Republic) Libuše Průšová	6–4, 6–2
Loss	1–2	Aug 2003	Espoo, Finland	Clay	(Ukraine) Tatiana Perebiynis	(Russia) Evgenia Kulikovskaya (Ukraine) Elena Tatarkova	2–6, 4–6
Loss	1–3	Jan 2005	Pattaya, Thailand	Hard	(Poland) Marta Domachowska	(Spain) Rosa María Andrés Rodríguez (Romania) Andreea Vanc	3–6, 1–6

== ITF finals ==
$25,000 tournaments
$10,000 tournaments

=== Singles: 2 (1–1) ===
Result	Date	Tournament	Surface	Opponent	Score
Win	25 March 1996	ITF Makarska, Croatia	Clay	(Czech Republic) Zuzana Lešenarová	5–7, 6–4, 6–2
Loss	1 June 1998	ITF Budapest, Hungary	Clay	(Hungary) Anna Földényi	2–6, 4–6

== Best Grand Slam results details ==
	Australian Open	
2001 Australian Open
Round	Opponent	Score
1R	(Australia) Alicia Molik	6–0, 6–0
2R	(South Africa) Amanda Coetzer (10)	1–6, 3–6

	French Open	
1999 French Open
Round	Opponent	Score
1R	(France) Anne-Gaëlle Sidot	6–3, 6–4
2R	(United States) Chanda Rubin	2–6, 6–1, 6–4
3R	(Czech Republic) Jana Novotná (4)	4–6, 6–3, 4–6
2004 French Open
Round	Opponent	Score
1R	(Switzerland) Emmanuelle Gagliardi	6–3, 6–4
2R	(France) Stéphanie Foretz (WC)	2–6, 7–6^{(10–8)}, 6–2
3R	(United States) Serena Williams (2)	0–6, 4–6

	Wimbledon Championships	
2000 Wimbledon
Round	Opponent	Score
1R	(Romania) Irina Spîrlea	6–4, 6–2
2R	(Croatia) Mirjana Lučić	6–2, 6–2
3R	(Switzerland) Martina Hingis (1)	2–6, 2–6

	US Open	
2001 US Open
Round	Opponent	Score
1R	(Argentina) Paola Suárez (24)	7–5, 6–2
2R	(Czech Republic) Dája Bedáňová	1–6, 3–6
2003 US Open
Round	Opponent	Score
1R	(Madagascar) Dally Randriantefy	6–3, 6–0
2R	(Belgium) Justine Henin-Hardenne (2)	1–6, 2–6

== Head-to-head records ==
- Anke Huber 3–0
- Martina Hingis 3–0
- Anna Kournikova 0–1
- Dominique Monami 1–0
- Silvia Farina Elia 7–2
- Lindsay Davenport 1–0
- Jennifer Capriati 2–1
- Arantxa Sánchez Vicario 2–1
- Elena Dementieva 1–0
- Serena Williams 1–0
