= 2006 Nordea Nordic Light Open – Doubles =

Doubles
- 2006 Nordea Nordic Light Open

Final
- Champions: (Czech Republic) Eva Birnerová (Slovakia) Jarmila Gajdošová
- Runners-up: (China) Yan Zi (China) Zheng Jie
- Score: 0–6, 6–4, 6–2

Details
- Draw: 16 (1WC/1Q)
- Seeds: 4

Events
Singles	Doubles
← 2005 ·	Nordic Light Open	· 2007 →

Émilie Loit and Katarina Srebotnik were the defending champions, but none competed this year.

Eva Birnerová and Jarmila Gajdošová won the title by defeating Yan Zi and Zheng Jie 0–6, 6–4, 6–2 in the final.

== Seeds ==
1. (China) Yan Zi / (China) Zheng Jie (final)
2. (Greece) Eleni Daniilidou / (Germany) Jasmin Wöhr (semifinals)
3. (Ukraine) Yuliana Fedak / (Belarus) Anastasiya Yakimova (first round)
4. (Czech Republic) Gabriela Navrátilová / (Czech Republic) Vladimíra Uhlířová (quarterfinals)

== Draw ==
=== Key ===
- Q = Qualifier
- WC = Wild card
- LL = Lucky loser
- Alt = Alternate
- ITF = ITF entry
- PR = Protected ranking
- SR = Special ranking
- SE = Special exempt
- JE = Junior exempt
- JR = Junior Accelerator Programme entrant
- CO = College Accelerator Programme entrant
- NG = Next Gen Accelerator Program entrant
- w/o = Walkover
- r = Retired
- d = Defaulted

=== Draw ===
First round
1	(China) Z Yan (China) J Zheng	6	6
(Austria) D Klemenschits (Austria) S Klemenschits	1	2
(Poland) K Jans (Poland) A Rosolska	6	7
Q	(Romania) S Cîrstea (Sweden) J Larsson	1	5
3	(Ukraine) Y Fedak (Belarus) A Yakimova	3	4
(France) S Cohen-Aloro (Tunisia) S Sfar	6	6
(Germany) K Barrois (Poland) A Radwańska	6	6
(Hungary) Z Gubacsi (Slovenia) A Klepač	1	0
(China) N Li (Australia) A Molik	4	5
(Czech Republic) E Birnerová (Slovakia) J Gajdošová	6	7
(Sweden) S Arvidsson (Germany) M Müller	6^{3}	2
4	(Czech Republic) G Navrátilová (Czech Republic) V Uhlířová	7^{7}	6
WC	(Finland) E Laine (Denmark) C Wozniacki	6	6
(Sweden) M Andersson (Sweden) N Roma	4	1
(Ukraine) Y Beygelzimer (Russia) E Bychkova	4	1
2	(Greece) E Daniilidou (Germany) J Wöhr	6	6

Quarterfinals
1	(China) Z Yan (China) J Zheng	6	6
(Poland) K Jans (Poland) A Rosolska	0	0
(France) S Cohen-Aloro (Tunisia) S Sfar	6	4	6
(Germany) K Barrois (Poland) A Radwańska	2	6	1
(Czech Republic) E Birnerová (Slovakia) J Gajdošová	6	3	6
4	(Czech Republic) G Navrátilová (Czech Republic) V Uhlířová	2	6	3
WC	(Finland) E Laine (Denmark) C Wozniacki	4	0
2	(Greece) E Daniilidou (Germany) J Wöhr	6	6

Semifinals
1	(China) Z Yan (China) J Zheng	6	6
(France) S Cohen-Aloro (Tunisia) S Sfar	3	2
(Czech Republic) E Birnerová (Slovakia) J Gajdošová	5	6	6
2	(Greece) E Daniilidou (Germany) J Wöhr	7	3	1

Final
1	(China) Z Yan (China) J Zheng	6	4	2
(Czech Republic) E Birnerová (Slovakia) J Gajdošová	0	6	6
