= 2007 Nordea Nordic Light Open – Singles =

Singles
- 2007 Nordea Nordic Light Open

Final
- Champion: (Poland) Agnieszka Radwańska
- Runner-up: (Russia) Vera Dushevina
- Score: 6–1, 6–1

Events
Singles	Doubles
← 2006 ·	Nordea Nordic Light Open	· 2008 →

Agnieszka Radwańska defeated Vera Dushevina in the final, 6–1, 6–1 to win the singles tennis title at the 2007 Nordea Nordic Light Open. It was her first WTA Tour title, and she was the first Pole to win a WTA Tour singles title.

Zheng Jie was the reigning champion, but chose not to participate that year.

== Seeds ==
1. (Spain) Anabel Medina Garrigues (second round)
2. (Poland) Agnieszka Radwańska (champion)
3. (France) Émilie Loit (quarterfinals)
4. (Estonia) Kaia Kanepi (first round)
5. (France) Nathalie Dechy (first round)
6. (Russia) Elena Vesnina (second round)
7. (Italy) Karin Knapp (Could not participate)
8. (Russia) Vera Dushevina (final)
9. (Italy) Maria Elena Camerin (first round)

== Draw ==
=== Key ===
- Q = Qualifier
- WC = Wild card
- LL = Lucky loser
- Alt = Alternate
- SE = Special exempt
- PR = Protected ranking
- ITF = ITF entry
- JE = Junior exempt
- w/o = Walkover
- r = Retired
- d = Defaulted
- SR = Special ranking

=== Finals ===
Semifinals
8	(Russia) Vera Dushevina	6	5	6
Q	(Germany) Julia Görges	4	7	3
(Bulgaria) Tsvetana Pironkova	4	3
2	(Poland) Agnieszka Radwańska	6	6

Final
8	(Russia) Vera Dushevina	1	1
2	(Poland) Agnieszka Radwańska	6	6

=== Top half ===
First round
1	(Spain) A Medina Garrigues	6	7^{7}
(Germany) S Klösel	3	6^{5}
(Slovakia) D Cibulková	5	6	6
(Belarus) K Milevskaya	7	0	3
(Czech Republic) E Birnerová	2	7^{7}	1
WC	(Finland) E Laine	6	6^{4}	6
WC	(Sweden) H Nooni	2	6	1
8	(Russia) V Dushevina	6	4	6
3	(Russia) É Loit	6	6
(Germany) A Petkovic	4	2
LL	(Chinese Taipei) C-w Chan	4	6	2
(Spain) V Ruano Pascual	6	3	6
WC	(Sweden) M Johansson	7	2	3
(Czech Republic) K Zakopalová	5	6	6
Q	(Germany) J Görges	7	6^{5}	6
9	(Italy) ME Camerin	5	7^{7}	4

Second round
1	(Spain) A Medina Garrigues	3	7^{7}	3
(Slovakia) D Cibulková	6	6^{3}	6
WC	(Finland) E Laine	3	3
8	(Russia) V Dushevina	6	6
3	(France) É Loit	4	7^{7}	7^{9}
(Spain) V Ruano Pascual	6	6^{1}	6^{7}
(Czech Republic) K Zakopalová	6	2	6^{4}
Q	(Germany) J Görges	0	6	7^{7}

Quarterfinals
(Slovakia) D Cibulková	4	7^{7}	3
8	(Russia) V Dushevina	6	6^{3}	6
3	(France) É Loit	0^{r}
Q	(Germany) J Görges	2

Semifinals
8	(Russia) V Dushevina	6	5	6
Q	(Germany) J Görges	4	7	3

=== Bottom half ===
First round
5	(France) N Dechy	6^{3}	3
(Bulgaria) T Pironkova	7^{7}	6
(Germany) A-L Grönefeld	6	6
(Czech Republic) I Benešová	0	2
(Austria) Y Meusburger	2	4
(France) S Cohen-Aloro	6	6
Q	(France) Y Fedossova	7^{12}	3	6
4	(Estonia) K Kanepi	6^{10}	6	3
6	(Russia) E Vesnina	6	6
(Sweden) S Arvidsson	1	3
(Denmark) C Wozniacki	7^{7}	7
Q	(Lithuania) L Stančiūtė	6^{4}	5
Q	(Poland) M Domachowska	4	6	6
(Czech Republic) P Kvitová	6	3	1
(Germany) T Malek	2	1
2	(Poland) A Radwańska	6	6

Second round
(Bulgaria) T Pironkova	6	6
(Germany) A-L Grönefeld	4	4
(France) S Cohen-Aloro	5	6	6
Q	(France) Y Fedossova	7	4	2
6	(Russia) E Vesnina	5	1
(Denmark) C Wozniacki	7	6
Q	(Poland) M Domachowska	0	3
2	(Poland) A Radwańska	6	6

Quarterfinals
(Bulgaria) T Pironkova	6^{3}	7^{7}	6
(France) S Cohen-Aloro	7^{7}	6^{5}	1
(Denmark) C Wozniacki	4	1
2	(Poland) A Radwańska	6	6

Semifinals
(Bulgaria) T Pironkova	4	3
2	(Poland) A Radwańska	6	6
