= 2007 Nordea Nordic Light Open – Doubles =

Doubles
- 2007 Nordea Nordic Light Open

Final
- Champion: (Spain) Anabel Medina Garrigues (Spain) Virginia Ruano Pascual
- Runner-up: (Chinese Taipei) Chin Wei Chan (Ukraine) Tetiana Luzhanska
- Score: 6–1, 5–7, [10–6]

Events
Singles	Doubles
← 2006 ·	Nordea Nordic Light Open	· 2008 →

Eva Birnerová and Jarmila Gajdošová are the defending champions but only Eva Birnerová participated this year.

Eva Birnerová partnered Caroline Wozniacki, but they lost in quarterfinals to Anabel Medina Garrigues and Virginia Ruano Pascual.

== Seeds ==
1. (Spain) Anabel Medina Garrigues / (Spain) Virginia Ruano Pascual (champions)
2. (Russia) Vera Dushevina / (Russia) Elena Vesnina (semifinals)
3. (France) Nathalie Dechy / (France) Émilie Loit (quarterfinals)
4. (Germany) Anna-Lena Grönefeld / (Germany) Tatjana Malek (quarterfinals)

== Draw ==
=== Key ===
- Q = Qualifier
- WC = Wild card
- LL = Lucky loser
- Alt = Alternate
- SE = Special exempt
- PR = Protected ranking
- ITF = ITF entry
- JE = Junior exempt
- w/o = Walkover
- r = Retired
- d = Defaulted
- SR = Special ranking

== Doubles draw ==
First round
1	(Spain) A Medina Garrigues (Spain) V Ruano Pascual	6	6
(Sweden) S Arvidsson (Estonia) K Kanepi	3	4
(Czech Republic) E Birnerová (Denmark) C Wozniacki	6	6
WC	(Sweden) M Johansson (Sweden) H Nooni	3	3
4	(Germany) AL Grönefeld (Germany) T Malek	6	6
(Austria) Y Meusburger (Lithuania) L Stančiūtė	2	2
(Germany) J Görges (Germany) A Petkovic	6	2	[4]
(China) Han X (China) Lu JJ	2	6	[10]
(Chinese Taipei) Chan CW (Ukraine) T Luzhanska	6	3	[13]
(France) S Cohen-Aloro (France) Y Fedossova	4	6	[11]
(Belgium) D Feys (Sweden) A Srndovic	1	3
3	(France) N Dechy (France) É Loit	6	6
(Poland) M Domachowska (Finland) E Laine	2	4
(Poland) A Radwańska (Poland) U Radwańska	6	6
(Czech Republic) I Benešová (Czech Republic) K Zakopalová	2	2
2	(Russia) V Dushevina (Russia) E Vesnina	6	6

Quarterfinals
1	(Spain) A Medina Garrigues (Spain) V Ruano Pascual	7^{7}	6
(Czech Republic) E Birnerová (Denmark) C Wozniacki	6^{2}	4
4	(Germany) AL Grönefeld (Germany) T Malek	2	1
(China) Han X (China) Lu JJ	6	6
(Chinese Taipei) Chan CW (Ukraine) T Luzhanska	6	6
3	(France) N Dechy (France) É Loit	4	3
(Poland) A Radwańska (Poland) U Radwańska	6	3	[11]
2	(Russia) V Dushevina (Russia) E Vesnina	4	6	[13]

Semifinals
1	(Spain) A Medina Garrigues (Spain) V Ruano Pascual	7^{7}	6
(China) Han X (China) Lu JJ	6^{3}	0
(Chinese Taipei) Chan CW (Ukraine) T Luzhanska	w	/	o
2	(Russia) V Dushevina (Russia) E Vesnina

Finals
1	(Spain) A Medina Garrigues (Spain) V Ruano Pascual	6	5	[10]
(Chinese Taipei) Chan CW (Ukraine) T Luzhanska	1	7	[6]
