= 2008 Nordea Nordic Light Open – Singles =

Singles
- 2008 Nordea Nordic Light Open

Final
- Champion: (Denmark) Caroline Wozniacki
- Runner-up: (Russia) Vera Dushevina
- Score: 6–0, 6–2

Events
Singles	Doubles
← 2007 ·	Nordea Nordic Light Open	· 2009 →

Agnieszka Radwańska was the defending champion, but lost in the semifinals to Caroline Wozniacki.

Wozniacki went on to win the final, defeating Vera Dushevina, dropping just two games to claim the first title of her career.

== Seeds ==
1. (Poland) Agnieszka Radwańska (semifinals)
2. (Hungary) Ágnes Szávay (second round)
3. (Slovenia) Katarina Srebotnik (semifinals)
4. (Denmark) Caroline Wozniacki (champion)
5. (Spain) Anabel Medina Garrigues (quarterfinals)
6. (India) Sania Mirza (second round)
7. (Ukraine) Kateryna Bondarenko (first round)
8. (New Zealand) Marina Erakovic (first round)

== Draw ==
=== Key ===
- Q = Qualifier
- WC = Wild card
- LL = Lucky loser
- Alt = Alternate
- ITF = ITF entry
- PR = Protected ranking
- SR = Special ranking
- SE = Special exempt
- JE = Junior exempt
- JR = Junior Accelerator Programme entrant
- CO = College Accelerator Programme entrant
- NG = Next Gen Accelerator Program entrant
- w/o = Walkover
- r = Retired
- d = Defaulted

=== Finals ===
Semifinals
1	(Poland) Agnieszka Radwańska	4	1
4	(Denmark) Caroline Wozniacki	6	6
3	(Slovenia) Katarina Srebotnik	1	2
(Russia) Vera Dushevina	6	6

Final
4	(Denmark) Caroline Wozniacki	6	6
(Russia) Vera Dushevina	0	2

=== Top half ===
First round
1	(Poland) A Radwańska	6	6
(France) N Dechy	2	3
(Russia) E Makarova	3	4
(Ukraine) M Koryttseva	6	6
(Germany) J Görges	6	6^{5}	4
WC	(Sweden) J Larsson	3	7	6
(France) C Pin	6	7
7	(Ukraine) K Bondarenko	4	6^{3}
4	(Denmark) C Wozniacki	6	6
Q	(Germany) A Kerber	3	4
WC	(Finland) E Laine	6	6
(Russia) A Panova	1	3
Q	(Czech Republic) B Záhlavová-Strýcová	6	6^{2}	6
(Czech Republic) P Cetkovská	4	7	4
WC	(Sweden) S Roma	3	1
5	(Spain) A Medina Garrigues	6	6

Second round
1	(Poland) A Radwańska	6	6
(Ukraine) M Koryttseva	1	1
WC	(Sweden) J Larsson	3	2
(France) C Pin	6	6
4	(Denmark) C Wozniacki	6	6
WC	(Finland) E Laine	1	0
Q	(Czech Republic) B Záhlavová-Strýcová	1	0
5	(Spain) A Medina Garrigues	6	6

Quarterfinals
1	(Poland) A Radwańska	6	1
(France) C Pin	2	0	r
4	(Denmark) C Wozniacki	6	6
5	(Spain) A Medina Garrigues	1	3

Semifinals
1	(Poland) A Radwańska	4	1
4	(Denmark) C Wozniacki	6	6

=== Bottom half ===
First round
8	(New Zealand) M Erakovic	3	4
Q	(Italy) ME Camerin	6	6
(Spain) V Ruano Pascual	3	7	6
(Spain) MJ Martínez Sánchez	6	6^{4}	2
Q	(Russia) A Pavlyuchenkova	6	3	6
(Russia) E Bychkova	4	6	1
(Russia) A Lapushchenkova	2	1
3	(Slovenia) K Srebotnik	6	6
6	(India) S Mirza	6	6
(France) É Loit	3	2
(Ukraine) T Perebiynis	2	2
(Czech Republic) I Benešová	6	6
(Russia) V Dushevina	7	6
(Czech Republic) L Šafářová	6^{4}	3
(Belgium) Y Wickmayer	5	6^{2}
2	(Hungary) Á Szávay	7	7

Second round
Q	(Italy) ME Camerin	3	2
(Spain) V Ruano Pascual	6	6
Q	(Russia) A Pavlyuchenkova	3	4
3	(Slovenia) K Srebotnik	6	6
6	(India) S Mirza	6	3	3
(Czech Republic) I Benešová	4	6	6
(Russia) V Dushevina	6	7
2	(Hungary) Á Szávay	4	6^{6}

Quarterfinals
(Spain) V Ruano Pascual	2	0
3	(Slovenia) K Srebotnik	6	6
(Czech Republic) I Benešová	3	3
(Russia) V Dushevina	6	6

Semifinals
3	(Slovenia) K Srebotnik	1	2
(Russia) V Dushevina	6	6
