= 2006 Nordea Nordic Light Open – Singles =

Singles
- 2006 Nordea Nordic Light Open

Final
- Champion: (China) Zheng Jie
- Runner-up: (Russia) Anastasia Myskina
- Score: 6–4, 6–1

Details
- Draw: 32 (3WC/4Q)
- Seeds: 8

Events
| Singles | Doubles |
| ← 2005 · | Nordic Light Open | · 2007 → |

Katarina Srebotnik was the defending champion, but could not compete this year after entering the US Open Series.

Zheng Jie won the title by defeating Anastasia Myskina 6–4, 6–1 in the final.

== Seeds ==
1. (Russia) Anastasia Myskina (final)
2. (China) Li Na (quarterfinals)
3. (China) Zheng Jie (champion)
4. (Sweden) Sofia Arvidsson (semifinals)
5. (Colombia) Catalina Castaño (second round)
6. (Belarus) Anastasiya Yakimova (first round)
7. (Czech Republic) Iveta Benešová (first round)
8. (Czech Republic) Klára Zakopalová (first round)

== Draw ==
=== Key ===
- Q = Qualifier
- WC = Wild card
- LL = Lucky loser
- Alt = Alternate
- SE = Special exempt
- PR = Protected ranking
- ITF = ITF entry
- JE = Junior exempt
- w/o = Walkover
- r = Retired
- d = Defaulted
- SR = Special ranking

=== Finals ===
Semifinals
1 | (Russia) Anastasia Myskina | 6 | 6
4 | (Sweden) Sofia Arvidsson | 2 | 4
3 | (China) Zheng Jie | 6 | 7^{7}
(Bulgaria) Tsvetana Pironkova | 2 | 6^{5}

Final
1 | (Russia) Anastasia Myskina | 4 | 1
3 | (China) Zheng Jie | 6 | 6

=== Top half ===
First round
1 | (Russia) A Myskina | 7^{7} | 6
WC | (Australia) A Molik | 6^{5} | 3
Q | (Poland) U Radwańska | 6 | 6
(Russia) E Bychkova | 2 | 2
(Czech Republic) K Böhmová | 6 | 3 | 1
(Switzerland) E Gagliardi | 0 | 6 | 6
(Slovakia) M Suchá | 7^{7} | 2 | 6
8 | (Czech Republic) K Zakopalová | 6^{3} | 6 | 4
4 | (Sweden) S Arvidsson | 7 | 4 | 7
(Finland) E Laine | 5 | 6 | 5
WC | (Sweden) J Larsson | 4 | 7 | 7
Q | (Germany) K Barrois | 6 | 5 | 5
(Czech Republic) E Birnerová | 6 | 6
(Germany) S Klösel | 4 | 2
(Slovakia) J Gajdošová | 6 | 6
6 | (Belarus) A Yakimova | 2 | 3

Second round
1 | (Russia) A Myskina | 7^{7} | 6
Q | (Poland) U Radwańska | 6^{3} | 3
(Switzerland) E Gagliardi | 6 | 5 | 0^{r}
(Slovakia) M Suchá | 4 | 7 | 4
4 | (Sweden) S Arvidsson | 6 | 1 | 6
WC | (Sweden) J Larsson | 2 | 6 | 4
(Czech Republic) E Birnerová | 6 | 6
(Slovakia) J Gajdošová | 2 | 3

Quarterfinals
1 | (Russia) A Myskina | 6 | 6
(Slovakia) M Suchá | 4 | 4
4 | (Sweden) S Arvidsson | 4 | 6 | 2
(Czech Republic) E Birnerová | 6 | 3 | 0^{r}

Semifinals
1 | (Russia) A Myskina | 6 | 6
4 | (Sweden) S Arvidsson | 2 | 4

=== Bottom half ===
First round
7 | (Czech Republic) I Benešová | 2 | 0
WC | (Denmark) C Wozniacki | 6 | 6
Q | (France) S Cohen-Aloro | 2 | 7 | 4
(Greece) E Daniilidou | 6 | 5 | 6
(Estonia) K Kanepi | 6 | 6
Q | (Romania) S Cîrstea | 1 | 4
(China) Z Yan | 5 | 0
3 | (China) J Zheng | 7 | 6
5 | (Colombia) C Castaño | 7^{7} | 6
(Ukraine) Y Fedak | 6^{3} | 3
(Bulgaria) T Pironkova | 7 | 6
(Italy) N Viérin | 5 | 3
(Germany) M Müller | 3 | 4
(Ukraine) Y Beygelzimer | 6 | 6
(Estonia) M Ani | 1 | 5
2 | (China) N Li | 6 | 7

Second round
WC | (Denmark) C Wozniacki | 7 | 7
(Greece) E Daniilidou | 5 | 5
(Estonia) K Kanepi | 4 | 4
3 | (China) J Zheng | 6 | 6
5 | (Colombia) C Castaño | 4 | 2
(Bulgaria) T Pironkova | 6 | 6
(Ukraine) Y Beygelzimer | 4 | 0
2 | (China) N Li | 6 | 6

Quarterfinals
WC | (Denmark) C Wozniacki | 3 | 1
3 | (China) J Zheng | 6 | 6
(Bulgaria) T Pironkova | 6 | 7^{9}
2 | (China) N Li | 2 | 6^{7}

Semifinals
3 | (China) J Zheng | 6 | 7^{7}
(Bulgaria) T Pironkova | 2 | 6^{5}
