= 2008 Nordea Nordic Light Open – Doubles =

Doubles
- 2008 Nordea Nordic Light Open

Final
- Champions: (Czech Republic) Iveta Benešová; (Czech Republic) Barbora Záhlavová-Strýcová
- Runners-up: (Czech Republic) Petra Cetkovská; (Czech Republic) Lucie Šafářová
- Score: 7–5, 6–4

Events
| Singles | Doubles |
| ← 2007 · | Nordea Nordic Light Open | · 2009 → |

Anabel Medina Garrigues and Virginia Ruano Pascual were the defending champions, but lost in the semifinals to Iveta Benešová and Barbora Záhlavová-Strýcová.

Iveta Benešová and Barbora Záhlavová-Strýcová won in the final 7–5, 6–4, against Petra Cetkovská and Lucie Šafářová.

== Seeds ==
1. (Spain) Anabel Medina Garrigues / (Spain) Virginia Ruano Pascual (semifinals)
2. (France) Nathalie Dechy / (India) Sania Mirza (first round)
3. (Ukraine) Mariya Koryttseva / (Ukraine) Tatiana Perebiynis (first round)
4. (Czech Republic) Iveta Benešová / (Czech Republic) Barbora Záhlavová-Strýcová (champions)

== Draw ==
=== Key ===
- Q = Qualifier
- WC = Wild card
- LL = Lucky loser
- Alt = Alternate
- SE = Special exempt
- PR = Protected ranking
- ITF = ITF entry
- JE = Junior exempt
- w/o = Walkover
- r = Retired
- d = Defaulted
- SR = Special ranking

=== Draw ===
First round

Quarterfinals

Semifinals

Final

1
- (Spain) A Medina Garrigues
- (Spain) V Ruano Pascual
7
6

- (Russia) E Bychkova
- (Russia) V Manasieva
5
1

1
- (Spain) A Medina Garrigues
- (Spain) V Ruano Pascual
6
7

- (Belgium) D Feys
- (Sweden) A Srndovic
6
6^{4}
[4]

- (France) S Lefèvre
- (Germany) J Wöhr
4
5

- (France) S Lefèvre
- (Germany) J Wöhr
4
7
[10]

1
- (Spain) A Medina Garrigues
- (Spain) V Ruano Pascual
3
4

4
- (Czech Republic) I Benešová
- (Czech Republic) B Záhlavová-Strýcová
6
6

4
- (Czech Republic) I Benešová
- (Czech Republic) B Záhlavová-Strýcová
6
6

- (Sweden) K Andlovic
- (United Kingdom) M Carter
2
2

4
- (Czech Republic) I Benešová
- (Czech Republic) B Záhlavová-Strýcová
3
6
[10]

- (Finland) E Laine
- (Sweden) J Larsson
6
6

- (Finland) E Laine
- (Sweden) J Larsson
6
3
[6]

WC
- (Denmark) K Barbat
- (Sweden) S Roma
3
1

4
- (Czech Republic) I Benešová
- (Czech Republic) B Záhlavová-Strýcová
7
6

- (Russia) V Dushevina
- (Russia) E Makarova
4
2

- (Czech Republic) P Cetkovská
- (Czech Republic) L Šafářová
5
4

- (Czech Republic) P Cetkovská
- (Czech Republic) L Šafářová
6
6

- (Czech Republic) P Cetkovská
- (Czech Republic) L Šafářová
6
6

- (New Zealand) M Erakovic
- (Germany) J Görges
1
7
[10]

- (New Zealand) M Erakovic
- (Germany) J Görges
4
2

3
- (Ukraine) M Koryttseva
- (Ukraine) T Perebiynis
6
6^{1}
[6]

- (Czech Republic) P Cetkovská
- (Czech Republic) L Šafářová
w/o

- (Italy) ME Camerin
- (Russia) A Pavlyuchenkova
6
6

- (France) C Pin
- (Belgium) Y Wickmayer

- (United Kingdom) S Borwell
- (United States) C Nagle
2
2

- (Italy) ME Camerin
- (Russia) A Pavlyuchenkova
5
6
[11]

- (France) C Pin
- (Belgium) Y Wickmayer
1
7
[10]

- (France) C Pin
- (Belgium) Y Wickmayer
7
3
[13]

2
- (France) N Dechy
- (India) S Mirza
6
6^{2}
[7]
