= 2006 Nordea Nordic Light Open =

- Date: 7–13 August
- Edition: 5th
- Category: Tier IV Series
- Draw: 32S / 16D
- Prize money: $145,000
- Surface: Hard / outdoor
- Location: Stockholm, Sweden
- Venue: Stockholm Olympic Stadium

Champions

Singles
- (China) Zheng Jie

Doubles
- (Czech Republic) Eva Birnerová / (Slovakia) Jarmila Gajdošová
- Nordic Light Open

The 2006 Nordea Nordic Light Open was a women's tennis tournament played on outdoor hard courts. It was the 4th edition of the Nordic Light Open, and was part of the Tier IV Series of the 2006 WTA Tour. It was the fifth edition of the tournament and took place at the Stockholm Olympic Stadium (Note: Due to persistent rain the singles final was moved to the indoor Kungliga tennishallen at 1–1 in the first set.) in Stockholm, Sweden, from 7 August until 13 August 2006. Third-seeded Zheng Jie won the singles title and earned $22,900 first-prize money.

== Finals ==
=== Singles ===
(China) Zheng Jie defeated (Russia) Anastasia Myskina, 6–4, 6–1

- It was Jie's 2nd singles title of the year and the 3rd title of her career.

=== Doubles ===
(Czech Republic) Eva Birnerová / (Slovakia) Jarmila Gajdošová defeated (China) Yan Zi / (China) Zheng Jie, 0–6, 6–4, 6–2

== Prize money and ranking points ==
=== Prize money ===
Event	W	F	SF	QF	Round of 16	Round of 32	Q3	Q2	Q1
Singles	$22,000	$12,345	$6,650	$3,580	$1,925	$1,035	$555	$300	$175
Doubles *	$6,750	$3,640	$1,960	$1,050	$565	—N/a	—N/a	—N/a	—N/a

_{* per team}

=== Ranking points ===
Event	W	F	SF	QF	Round of 16	Round of 32
Singles	95	67	43	24	12	1
Doubles	95	67	43	24	1	—N/a
