= 2007 Nordea Nordic Light Open =

- Date: 30 July – 5 August
- Edition: 6th
- Category: Tier IV Series
- Draw: 32S / 16D
- Prize money: $145,000
- Surface: Hard / outdoor
- Location: Stockholm, Sweden

Champions

Singles
- (Poland) Agnieszka Radwańska

Doubles
- (Spain) Anabel Medina Garrigues / (Spain) Virginia Ruano Pascual
← 2006 ·	Nordic Light Open	· 2008 →

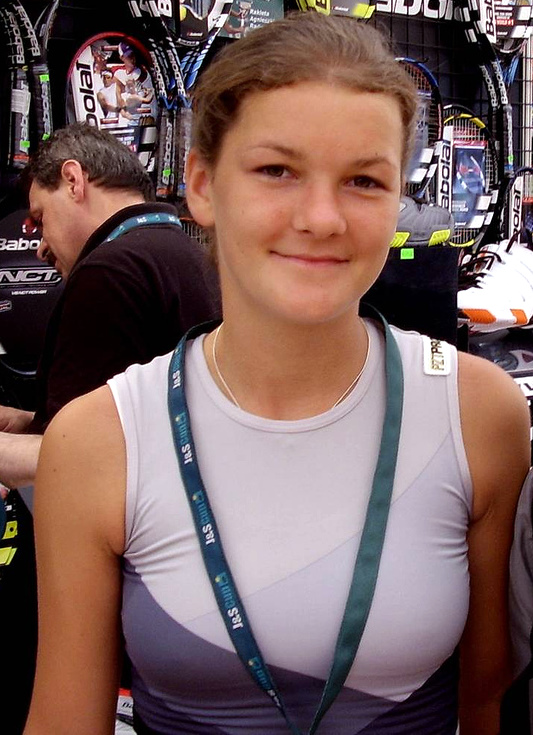
Agnieszka Radwańska in 2007

The 2007 Nordea Nordic Light Open was a women's tennis tournament played on outdoor hard courts. It was the 6th edition of the Nordea Nordic Light Open, and was part of the Tier IV Series of the 2007 WTA Tour. It took place in Stockholm, Sweden, from 30 July until 5 August 2007.

Second-seeded Agnieszka Radwańska won the singles title and it was also her first career title. The tournament's doubles competition was won by Anabel Medina Garrigues and Virginia Ruano Pascual.

== Finals ==
=== Singles ===
(Poland) Agnieszka Radwańska defeated (Russia) Vera Dushevina, 6–1, 6–1

- It was Radwańska's 1st title of her career.

=== Doubles ===
(Spain) Anabel Medina Garrigues / (Spain) Virginia Ruano Pascual defeated (Chinese Taipei) Chan Chin-wei / (Ukraine) Tetiana Luzhanska, 6–1, 5–7, [10–6]
