= 2008 Nordea Nordic Light Open =

- Date: 28 July – 3 August
- Edition: 7th
- Category: Tier IV Series
- Draw: 32S /16D
- Prize money: $145,000
- Surface: Hard / outdoor
- Location: Stockholm, Sweden

Champions

Singles
- (Denmark) Caroline Wozniacki

Doubles
- (Czech Republic) Iveta Benešová; (Czech Republic) Barbora Záhlavová-Strýcová
← 2007 ·	Nordic Light Open

The 2008 Nordea Nordic Light Open was a women's tennis tournament played on outdoor hard courts. It was the 7th edition of the Nordea Nordic Light Open, and was part of the Tier IV Series of the 2008 WTA Tour. It took place in Stockholm, Sweden, from 28 July until 3 August 2008. Fourth-seeded Caroline Wozniacki won the singles title and earned $22,925 first-prize money.

== Finals ==
=== Singles ===
(Denmark) Caroline Wozniacki defeated (Russia) Vera Dushevina, 6–0, 6–2

- It was Caroline Wozniacki's 1st career title.

=== Doubles ===
(Czech Republic) Iveta Benešová / (Czech Republic) Barbora Záhlavová-Strýcová defeated (Czech Republic) Petra Cetkovská / (Czech Republic) Lucie Šafářová, 7–5, 6–4
