= Caroline Wozniacki =

Danish tennis player (born 1990)

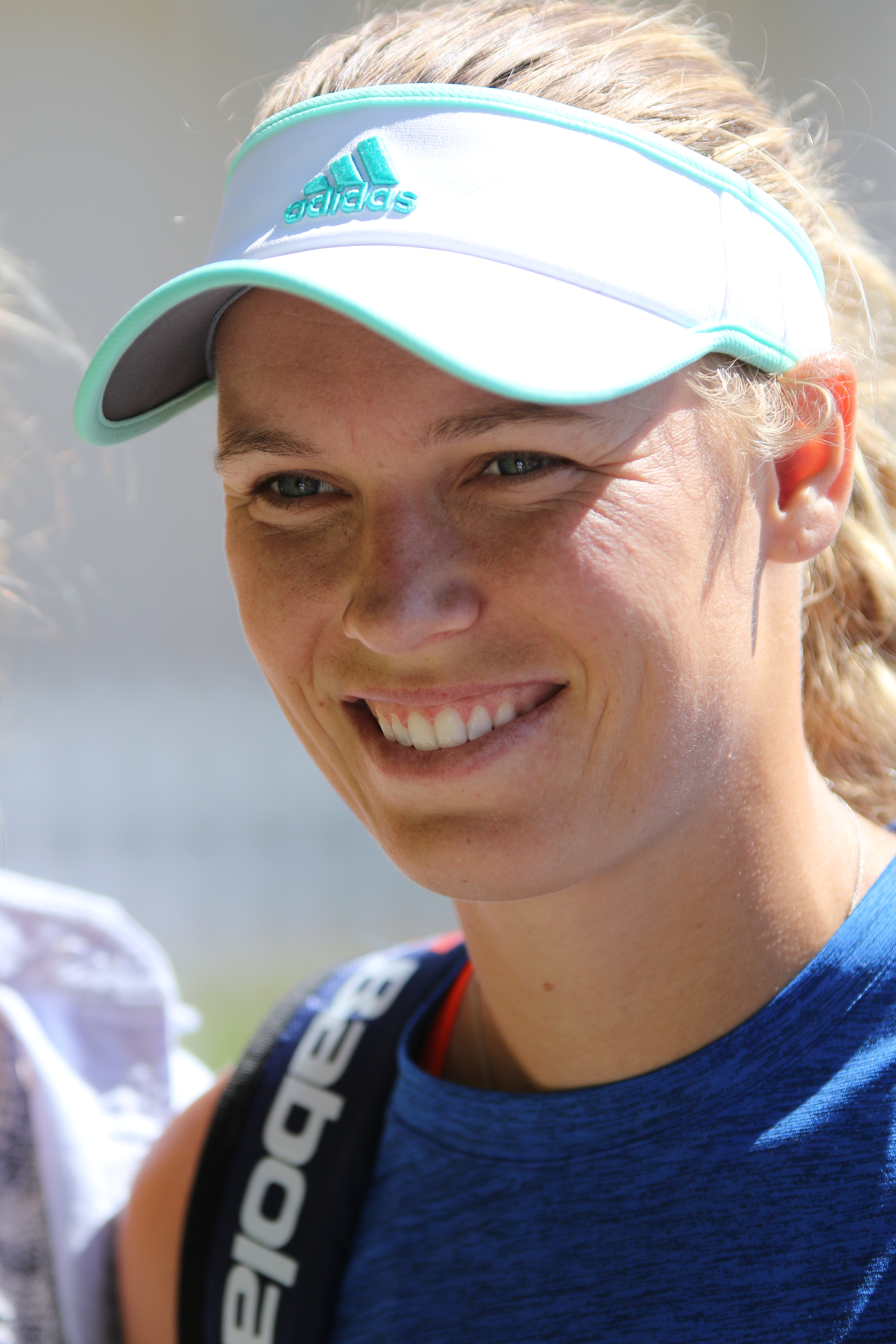
- Wozniacki at the 2017 Eastbourne International
- Country (sports): Denmark
- Residence: Fisher Island, Florida, US; Odense, Denmark; Monte Carlo, Monaco
- Born: 11 July 1990 (age 36) Odense, Denmark
- Height: 1.77 m (5 ft 10 in)
- Turned pro: 19 July 2005
- Retired: 2024
- Plays: Right-handed (two-handed backhand)
- Coach: Piotr Woźniacki (2004–2020, 2023–2024)
- Prize money: US$36,479,231: 10th all-time in earnings

Singles
- Career record: 655–280
- Career titles: 30
- Highest ranking: No. 1 (11 October 2010)

Grand Slam singles results
- Australian Open: W (2018)
- French Open: QF (2010, 2017)
- Wimbledon: 4R (2009, 2010, 2011, 2014, 2015, 2017)
- US Open: F (2009, 2014)

Other tournaments
- Tour Finals: W (2017)
- Olympic Games: QF (2012)

Doubles
- Career record: 39–56
- Career titles: 2
- Highest ranking: No. 52 (14 September 2009)

Grand Slam doubles results
- Australian Open: 2R (2008)
- French Open: 2R (2010)
- Wimbledon: 2R (2009, 2010)
- US Open: 3R (2009)
- Last updated on: 20 December 2025.

Caroline Wozniacki R (Danish: [kʰɑʁoˈliːnə vʌsniˈɑkʰi]; born 11 July 1990) is a Danish former professional tennis player. She has been ranked as the world No. 1 in women's singles by the WTA, holding the position for a total of 71 weeks (including as the year-end world No. 1 in 2010 and 2011). Wozniacki has won 30 WTA Tour-level singles titles, including a major at the 2018 Australian Open as well as the 2017 WTA Finals.

Wozniacki had a successful junior career, winning the junior title at the 2006 Wimbledon Championships. After being named the WTA Newcomer of the Year in 2008, she contested two major finals at the 2009 and 2014 US Opens, as well as the final at the 2010 WTA Tour Championships, becoming the world No. 1 in 2010. Wozniacki retired from the sport following the 2020 Australian Open. In 2022, she became a commentator for Tennis Channel and ESPN, before beginning a professional comeback at the 2023 Canadian Open and the US Open. She is known for her footwork and defensive skill. In November 2025, Wozniacki indicated that she was likely finished with professional tennis following her comeback.

== Early life ==
Wozniacki (Polish: Woźniacka) was born in Odense, Denmark. She is of Polish descent. Her mother Anna played on the Polish women's national volleyball team, and her father Piotr played professional football. The couple moved to Denmark when Piotr signed for the Danish football club B1909. Her older brother, Patrik Wozniacki, is a former professional footballer in Denmark.

== Juniors ==
Wozniacki had a career-high junior ranking of No. 2 in the world. She made her debut on the ITF Junior Circuit, the premier 18-and-under junior tour that is run by the International Tennis Federation (ITF), in October 2003 at 13 years and 3 months old. During her first month, she entered two Grade 5 events in Denmark, the lowest-level tournament on the tour. Wozniacki reached the final at both singles events, winning the second over compatriot Hanne Skak Jensen. With this success, she moved up to Grade 3 and Grade 4 tournaments, winning her first four singles events of 2004. Her win streak of five tournaments and 27 matches came to an end in April with a semifinal loss to Latisha Chan at the International Juniors Championships in Manila, her first event outside of Scandinavia as well as her first Grade 1 event. From this point on, Wozniacki only competed in Grade A and Grade 1 events, the two highest-level tournaments. She made her Grade A debut at Wimbledon before turning 14, losing her first main draw match to Bojana Bobusic. Towards the end of the year, Wozniacki won her first Grade A title at the Osaka Mayor's Cup.

Wozniacki won several junior tournaments in 2005, including the Orange Bowl. She made her debut on the WTA Tour at Cincinnati's Western & Southern Open on 19 July 2005, losing to the top-seeded and eventual champion Patty Schnyder in the first round. In the Nordic Light Open, her other WTA tournament of the year, she lost to Martina Suchá in the first round.

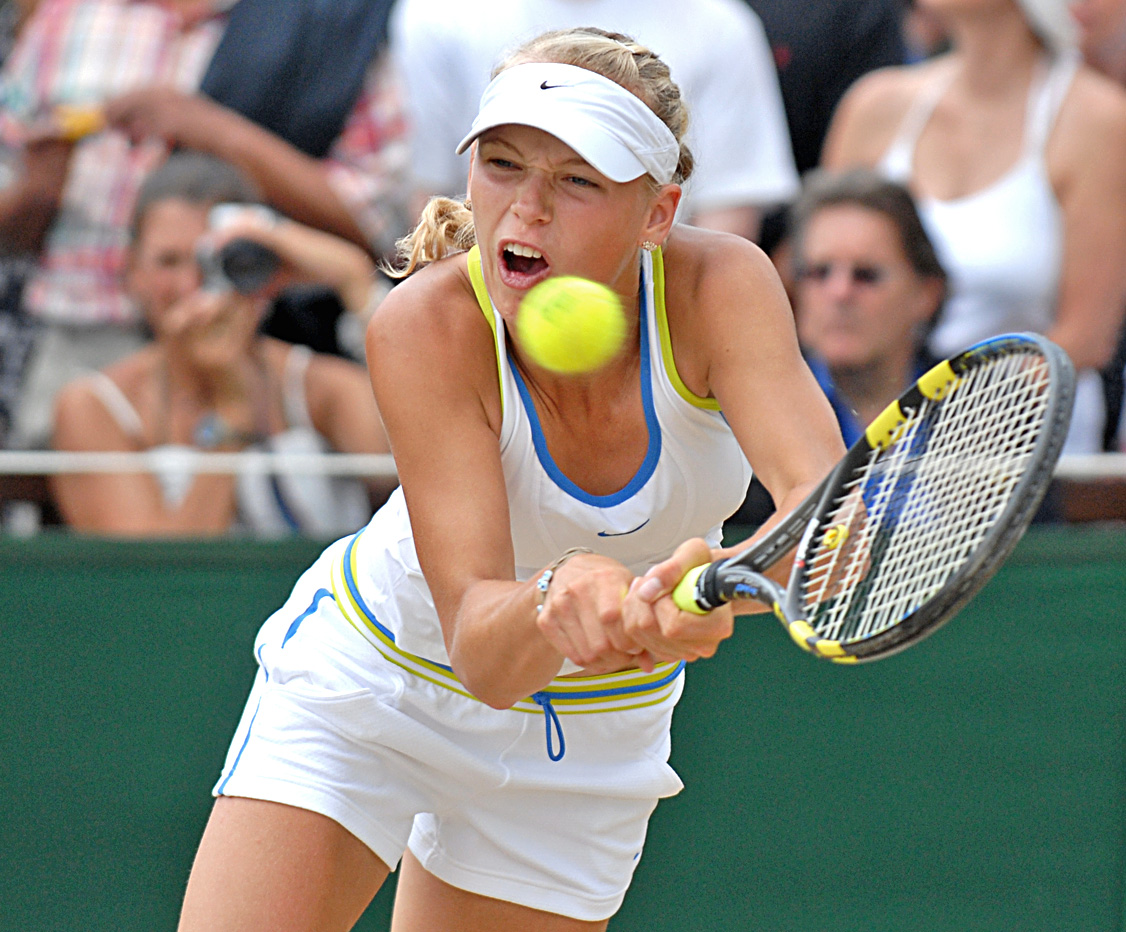
Wozniacki during the 2006 Wimbledon girls' singles final

In 2006, she was the top seed at the Australian Open (junior girls' singles), but lost the final to eighth-seeded Anastasia Pavlyuchenkova. She was seeded second with partner Anna Tatishvili in the doubles tournament, but the pair was knocked out in the semifinals by the French-Italian pair of Alizé Cornet and Corinna Dentoni, who were seeded eighth. In February at the Memphis, she reached her first WTA Tour quarterfinal, beating Kristina Brandi and Ashley Harkleroad before losing to third-seeded Sofia Arvidsson of Sweden. Before Wimbledon Wozniacki won the Liverpool International Tennis Tournament, an exhibition tournament, beating Ashley Harkleroad in the final. Later that year she was given a wild card to the qualifying draw at Wimbledon, where she was beaten in the first round by Miho Saeki. However, Wozniacki went on to win the Wimbledon girls' singles title, beating Magdaléna Rybáriková in the final. In August, she reached another WTA Tour quarterfinal, this time at the Nordic Light Open in Stockholm. She defeated top-100 players Iveta Benešová and Eleni Daniilidou, then lost to eventual champion and third-seeded Zheng Jie.

Wozniacki was seeded second in the US Open girls' singles. In the first round, she won the first set against Russian Alexandra Panova, but was disqualified in the second set for verbally abusing an umpire. Wozniacki was said to have used an expletive in referring to a linesman who made a disputed call. However, on her blog, she claimed to have said "take your sunglasses of [sic]" and was mistaken for talking to the linesman, when she in fact was criticizing herself after the next point.

In her last junior tournament, the Osaka Mayor's Cup, she won both the girls' singles and doubles. Her first title on the senior tour came in October when she won a $25k tournament in Istanbul by beating Tatjana Malek in the final. Wozniacki was set to face Venus Williams on 27 November in an exhibition match in Copenhagen, but five days before the event, Williams cancelled because of an injury. The two did, however, face each other in the Memphis WTA Tier III event on 20 February. Williams beat Wozniacki, ending a nine-match winning streak for Wozniacki. On 29 November Wozniacki was named ambassador for Danish Junior Tennis by the Culture Minister of Denmark at the time, Brian Mikkelsen.

On 4 February 2007, she won a $75k singles title in Ortisei, beating Italian Alberta Brianti. On 4 March, she won the $75k tournament in Las Vegas, beating top-seed Akiko Morigami in the final. She obtained a wild card for the Indian Wells Open main draw and made her Tier I debut there. She was knocked out in the second round by Martina Hingis. She then made the semifinals of the Japan Open in Tokyo in October, her first career WTA Tour semifinal. She became the first Danish woman to reach a WTA semifinal since Tine Scheuer-Larsen at Bregenz in 1986 but was defeated by Venus Williams, in straight sets.

== Professional ==
=== 2008: First WTA Tour title ===
At the Australian Open, Wozniacki defeated Gisela Dulko and 21st seed Alona Bondarenko on her way to the round of 16, where she lost to the eventual finalist and fourth-seeded Ana Ivanovic. At the French Open, Wozniacki was seeded 30th, making this the first Grand Slam tournament in which she was seeded. She again lost in the third round to the eventual champion and world No. 2, Ana Ivanovic. At Wimbledon, she reached the third round, but lost to second-seeded Jelena Janković.

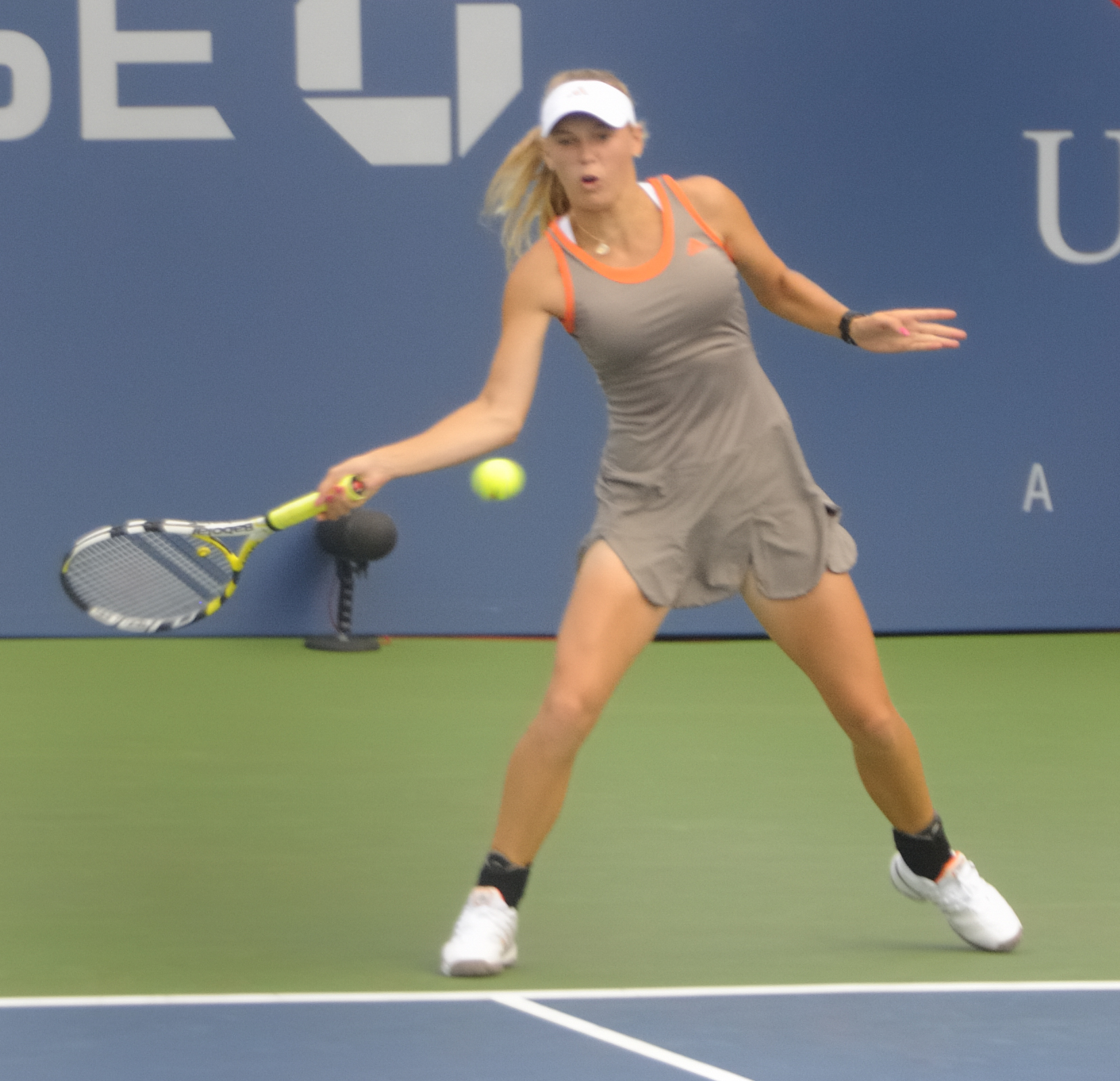
Wozniacki during the 2008 US Open

Wozniacki won her first WTA Tour title at the Nordic Light Open in Stockholm without dropping a set, defeating fifth seed Anabel Medina Garrigues in the quarterfinals, top seed and world No. 10 Agnieszka Radwańska in the semifinals, and Vera Dushevina in the final. At the Summer Olympics in Beijing she beat world No. 12, Daniela Hantuchová, in the second round, but then lost to the eventual gold-medalist Elena Dementieva. Wozniacki won her second WTA Tour title at the New Haven Open, after defeating three seeded players, Dominika Cibulková, Marion Bartoli and Alizé Cornet, en route to the final, where she stunned world No. 11, Anna Chakvetadze.

Wozniacki was the 21st seed at the US Open. She defeated world No. 14, Victoria Azarenka, in the third round, but lost to second-seeded and eventual runner-up Jelena Janković in the fourth round. At the China Open, she lost her opening match to Spaniard Anabel Medina Garrigues. However, she teamed up with Medina Garrigues to clinch the doubles title, defeating the Chinese duo of Han Xinyun and Xu Yifan. It was Wozniacki's first WTA doubles title. At the Tier III Japan Open, she was the top seed for the first time on the WTA Tour, and won her third career title, defeating Kaia Kanepi of Estonia in the final. Wozniacki then took part in the Danish Open, in her hometown of Odense. After a string of good performances, she won the tournament, beating world No. 64, Sofia Arvidsson, in the final.

Wozniacki's final win–loss record for the year (ITF matches included, exhibition matches not included) was 58–20 in singles and 8–9 in doubles. She ended the year ranked 12th in singles and 79th in doubles. She finished 13th in the race for the WTA Finals. She won the Newcomer of the Year award for 2008.

=== 2009: First major final and top-5 ranking ===
Wozniacki started the season in Auckland, where she lost to Elena Vesnina in the quarterfinals. She also reached the quarterfinals in Sydney, this time losing to world No. 2, Serena Williams, after having three match points. Seeded 11th at the Australian Open, Wozniacki lost in the third round to Australian Jelena Dokic.

In Pattaya, she lost to Magdaléna Rybáriková in the quarterfinals. Seeded number one at the Cellular South Cup in Memphis, Wozniacki advanced to the final, but lost to Victoria Azarenka, after they partnered in the doubles final to defeat Michaëlla Krajicek and Yuliana Fedak.

Wozniacki then took part in the first two Premier Mandatory tournaments of the year. At Indian Wells, she lost in the quarterfinals to eventual champion Vera Zvonareva. In Miami, she scored her first win over Elena Dementieva, then lost to Svetlana Kuznetsova in the quarterfinals.

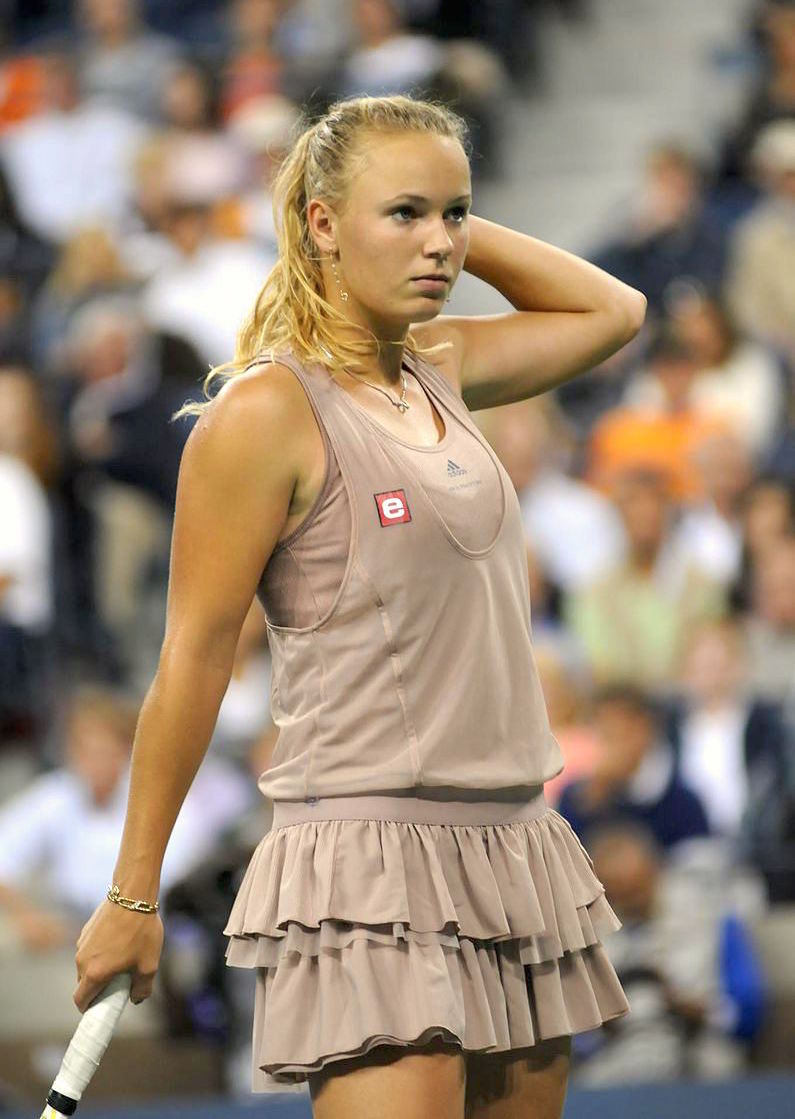
Wozniacki reached her first Grand Slam final at the 2009 US Open

Wozniacki won her first title of the year at the Amelia Island Championships on green clay in Ponte Vedra Beach, where she defeated Canadian Aleksandra Wozniak. In Charleston, she defeated top seed Elena Dementieva in the semifinals, then lost the final to Sabine Lisicki.

Wozniacki suffered early exits in her next two tournaments, losing to Marion Bartoli in the second round in Stuttgart, and to Victoria Azarenka in the third round in Rome. She reached the final of the inaugural Premier Mandatory Madrid Open but she lost to world No. 1, Dinara Safina. This was Wozniacki's only match against a reigning No. 1 before she became world No. 1 in October 2010. Seeded tenth at the French Open, she lost to Sorana Cîrstea in the third round. They partnered in doubles, but lost in the first round.

Wozniacki won her second 2009 title on the grass of Eastbourne. In the final, she defeated Virginie Razzano. Seeded ninth at Wimbledon, she lost to Sabine Lisicki in the fourth round.

On her 19th birthday, she lost the final of the Swedish Open to María José Martínez Sánchez. On hardcourt at the LA Women's Tennis Championships, she lost in the second round to Sorana Cîrstea. At the Cincinnati Open, she reached the quarterfinals, then lost to Elena Dementieva. In Toronto, she lost early in the second round to Zheng Jie, but she then went on to defend her title at the Pilot Pen Tennis in New Haven without losing a set. In the first round, she had her first double bagel win as a professional, 6–0, 6–0, over Edina Gallovits in 41 minutes. In the final, she beat Elena Vesnina for her third title of the season.

Wozniacki was the ninth seed at the US Open where she made her best result to date by becoming the first Danish woman to reach a Grand Slam championship final. Her route to the final included a hard-fought three-set win against reigning French Open champion Svetlana Kuznetsova in the fourth round, then scored straight sets wins against Melanie Oudin in the quarterfinals and Yanina Wickmayer in the semifinals. In the final, she was defeated by Kim Clijsters.

In the second round of the Pan Pacific Open, she retired because of a viral illness down 0–5 against Aleksandra Wozniak. She then lost to María José Martínez Sánchez in the first round of the China Open, and to Samantha Stosur in the semifinals in Osaka. The following week in Luxembourg, she retired with a hamstring injury in the first round while leading 7–5, 5–0 over Anne Kremer. This aroused controversy because of the scoreline.

Wozniacki's stellar 2009 results qualified her for the year-end WTA Tour Championships in Doha for the first time. She won two of three group matches and advanced to the semifinals. There she struggled with a stomach strain and a left thigh injury against world No. 1 Serena Williams, and retired while trailing 6–4, 0–1.

=== 2010: First Premier Mandatory title and world No. 1 ===
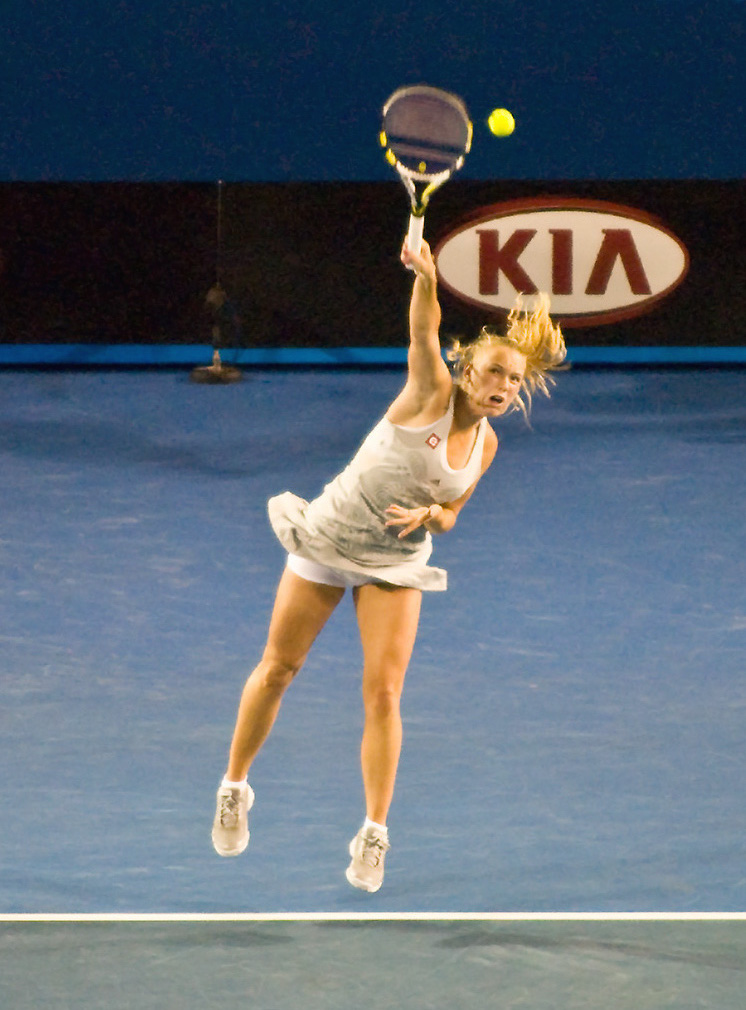
Wozniacki serving at the 2010 Australian Open

In her first WTA tournament of the year, Wozniacki suffered an opening-round loss to Li Na of China in the Sydney. She was seeded fourth at the Australian Open, her first top-eight seed in a Grand Slam. She again fell to Li, this time in the fourth round, in straight sets. Despite her fourth-round exit, Wozniacki achieved a career-high ranking of No. 3.

As the second seed at Indian Wells, Wozniacki reached the final, then lost to former world No. 1, Jelena Janković. With this result, she achieved a new career-high ranking of world No. 2. At the Miami Open, Wozniacki lost her quarterfinal match against the newly returned Justine Henin.

Her next tournament was in Ponte Vedra Beach, where she defeated Olga Govortsova in the final. Wozniacki then competed at the Family Circle Cup in Charleston. She advanced to the semifinals, where she met Vera Zvonareva. Wozniacki was forced to retire down 2–5 when she rolled her ankle.

Despite her ongoing ankle injury, she continued to compete in tournaments through the clay-court season, suffering early losses in Stuttgart, Rome and Madrid. She then reached the quarterfinals in Warsaw, but retired after losing the first set.

Wozniacki was seeded third at the French Open. She posted her best result at Roland Garros by advancing to the fourth round without dropping a set. After defeating Flavia Pennetta in the round of 16 in three sets, she lost to eventual champion Francesca Schiavone in the quarterfinals. Wozniacki partnered with Daniela Hantuchová in doubles, but they withdrew before their second round match against the Williams sisters because of a right shoulder injury to Hantuchová.

As the defending champion, Wozniacki lost early at the Eastbourne International, her first grass-court tournament of the year, to Aravane Rezaï. Wozniacki was seeded third at Wimbledon, where she defeated Tathiana Garbin, Chang Kai-chen, and Anastasia Pavlyuchenkova en route to the fourth round, where she was defeated by Petra Kvitová.

Wozniacki was the first seed at the inaugural Danish Open. It was the first Danish WTA Tour tournament, created largely out of Wozniacki's popularity in Denmark. She defeated Klára Zakopalová to win her second title of the year.

In Cincinnati, she lost in the third round to Marion Bartoli. As the second seed in Montreal, Wozniacki was forced to wait two days to play her semifinal match with Svetlana Kuznetsova because of heavy rain. She defeated both Kuznetsova and Vera Zvonareva on the same day for her third singles title of the year. As the top seed in New Haven, Wozniacki defeated Nadia Petrova in the final for her third consecutive title there. By virtue of this, she also won the US Open Series.

Wozniacki was the top seed at the US Open due to the withdrawal of world No. 1, Serena Williams. She advanced to the semifinals, then lost to Vera Zvonareva. With her semifinal appearance, Wozniacki became one of only two women (the other being Venus Williams) to have reached at least the fourth round of all four Grand Slam events in 2010.

Her first tournament during the Asian hard-court season was the Pan Pacific Open in Tokyo. She won back-to-back three-setters against Victoria Azarenka and Elena Dementieva, the latter of whom she beat in the final to win her fifth title of the year.

She then entered the China Open in Beijing. In the third round, Wozniacki faced Petra Kvitová, who had routed her at Wimbledon. Wozniacki avenged that loss, which ensured that she would replace Serena Williams as the new world No. 1 after the tournament. She was the fifth player to reach the No. 1 position without having won a Grand Slam tournament. She also became the first Danish player, man or woman, to reach the top ranking. Her China Open win was her 3rd consecutive Premier Mandatory/5 tournament title. Wozniacki ultimately won the tournament, defeating Zvonareva in the final to win her sixth title of the year and twelfth overall.

At the year-end WTA Championships in Doha, Wozniacki was drawn in a group with Francesca Schiavone, Samantha Stosur and Elena Dementieva. She defeated Dementieva in her first round-robin game, but lost to Stosur in the second. She won her last round-robin match in the group against Schiavone, securing the year-end world No. 1 rank and a place in the semifinals against the winner of the other group, Vera Zvonareva. Wozniacki defeated her, but then lost the final in three sets to Kim Clijsters. Wozniacki ended the season with six WTA Tour singles titles, the most on the tour. Clijsters won five, and no other player won more than two.

=== 2011: Year-end No. 1 for the second year in a row ===
During the off season, Wozniacki switched her racquet make from Babolat to Yonex. She began her 2011 season with an exhibition match in Thailand against Kim Clijsters where she lost in a super tie-break. Wozniacki then played another exhibition, the team Hong Kong Tennis Classic, where she represented and was captain of Team Europe. She won two matches against Team Asia Pacific, then was crushed by world No. 2, Vera Zvonareva, in the final against Team Russia. Her first WTA tournament was the Sydney International. She received a bye into the second round, where she lost to Dominika Cibulková.

The Australian Open was Wozniacki's first major as world No. 1. She lost to Li Na in the semifinals, failing to convert a match point when trying to serve out the match at 5–4 in the second set.

Wozniacki dropped to No. 2 behind Clijsters during the week of 14 February, but regained the top spot the following week. She received a bye to the second round in Dubai where, in the quarterfinals, she beat Shahar Pe'er to ensure her No. 1 position in the next rankings update. She went on to defeat Svetlana Kuznetsova in the final to take her 13th career singles title and first of the year. In Doha, she received a bye to the second round and reached the final, defeating Nadia Petrova, Flavia Pennetta and Marion Bartoli in straight sets. She lost to Vera Zvonareva in the final. In the first Premier Mandatory event of the year in Indian Wells, Wozniacki made it to the final, where she defeated Marion Bartoli for her 14th singles title. At the Miami Open, she lost in the fourth round to 21st seed Andrea Petkovic. She made an uncharacteristic 52 unforced errors and later said she had been playing a lot of matches when she was asked about fatigue.

In the Family Circle Cup, Wozniacki made it to the final, where she defeated unseeded Elena Vesnina to take her third title of the year, 15th of her career. In Stuttgart, she made it to her fifth final of the year, where she lost to Julia Görges in straight sets. In Madrid, Wozniacki lost to Görges again, this time in the third round. In Rome, she lost to eventual champion Maria Sharapova in the semifinal round. At the Brussels Open, Wozniacki reached the semifinals, where she defeated third seed and reigning French Open champion, Francesca Schiavone. In the final, Wozniacki's sixth of the year, she defeated eighth seed Peng Shuai to win her first red clay title, having won three titles on the faster green clay. Wozniacki was the top seed at the French Open, but was upset in the third round by 28th seed Daniela Hantuchová.

Wozniacki's next tournament was the Danish Open in her native country. In the final, she defeated fourth seed Lucie Šafářová, taking her fifth title of the year. At Wimbledon, she had straight-set wins until the fourth round, but then lost to 24th seed Dominika Cibulková.

At the Rogers Cup, Wozniacki made an early second-round exit. She was defeated by Roberta Vinci in straight sets despite holding a 5–1 lead in the second set. Wozniacki was the top seed at the Cincinnati Open, but lost in the second round to world No. 76, Christina McHale. Next playing at the New Haven Open, Wozniacki won the title for the fourth year in a row, defeating Francesca Schiavone in the semifinals and qualifier Petra Cetkovská in the final.

At the US Open, Wozniacki was the first seed. In the first round, she defeated Nuria Llagostera Vives. In the second round, Wozniacki defeated Arantxa Rus, and in the third round, defeated Vania King. In the fourth round, Wozniacki fought back from a 7–6, 4–1 deficit, defeating Svetlana Kuznetsova. Wozniacki then progressed to the semifinals by defeating Andrea Petkovic in the quarterfinals. She lost her semifinal match to Serena Williams.

In Tokyo, Wozniacki lost to Kaia Kanepi in the third round. In Beijing, she lost to Flavia Pennetta in the quarterfinals. This was Wozniacki's only loss in the 12 quarterfinals she reached in 2011.

Wozniacki was the top seed at the WTA Championships. In the group stage, she upset Agnieszka Radwańska but then lost to Vera Zvonareva. She also lost to Petra Kvitová in her final round-robin match and so failed to advance to semifinals for the first time in three appearances. She finished the year as world No. 1 for the second consecutive year. Despite narrowly edging Petra for the year-end No. 1 ranking in points, she lost on all Player of Year awards to Petra.

=== 2012: Beginning of singles decline ===
Wozniacki began her season by representing Denmark at the 2012 Hopman Cup with Frederik Nielsen as her partner. Wozniacki won two of her three round robin matches in singles, defeating Bethanie Mattek-Sands and Tsvetana Pironkova, then lost to world No. 2 Petra Kvitová. Her first WTA Tour event was the Sydney International where she defeated Dominika Cibulková when trailing 4–0 in the third set. She lost to Agnieszka Radwańska in three sets in the quarterfinals, after serving for the match at 5–4 up in the second set.

Wozniacki competed at the Australian Open as the top seed. She defeated Anastasia Rodionova, Anna Tatishvili, Monica Niculescu and Jelena Janković, all in straight sets, to reach the quarterfinals in which she lost to the defending champion Kim Clijsters. As a result, Wozniacki lost her top ranking and was replaced by the 2012 champion Victoria Azarenka. Next playing at Doha, Wozniacki lost to Lucie Šafářová in the second round, having received a first-round bye. Wozniacki was the defending champion in Dubai and Indian Wells, but failed to defend either title, losing to Julia Görges and Ana Ivanovic, respectively.

Wozniacki reached the semifinals in Miami, beating Barbora Záhlavová-Strýcová, Petra Cetkovská, Yanina Wickmayer and Serena Williams, all in straight sets. Wozniacki then lost to 2nd seed Maria Sharapova. Wozniacki did not defend her title in Charleston as she was not allowed to participate under WTA rules because two top-6 players had already entered the draw. Wozniacki then played her home tournament in Copenhagen. She reached the final but lost to Angelique Kerber, her first loss at the tournament since the start in 2010.

She then played the French Open, where she lost to Kaia Kanepi in three sets in the third round. At the Wimbledon, she lost to Austrian Tamira Paszek in the first round. It was her first opening-round exit from any Grand Slam since making her professional debut at the 2007 French Open.

Wozniacki represented Denmark at the Olympics as the eighth seed in the women's singles event. In the first three rounds she defeated Anne Keothavong, Yanina Wickmayer and Daniela Hantuchová. She was then defeated by the eventual champion Serena Williams in the quarterfinals. She next participated in the Rogers Cup where she lost to Petra Kvitová in the semifinals, and the Western & Southern Open where she was defeated in the third round by Anastasia Pavlyuchenkova. As the four-time defending champion at the New Haven Open, Wozniacki retired against Maria Kirilenko in the semifinals due to a right knee injury, which she had suffered in her quarterfinal win over Dominika Cibulková.

Wozniacki, still suffering with the injury, was seeded eighth at the US Open, but did not advance past the first round. She lost in two sets to 96th-ranked Romanian Irina-Camelia Begu. As a result of the loss, Wozniacki dropped out of the top 10 for the first time in three years. Following her US Open disappointment, Wozniacki won her first tournament of the year in Seoul by defeating Arantxa Rus, Caroline Garcia, Klára Zakopalová, Ekaterina Makarova and Kaia Kanepi in the final. It was her 19th career title.

Her next tournament was the Pan Pacific Open in Tokyo. She defeated Bojana Jovanovski, Daniela Hantuchová and Li Na, then lost to Agnieszka Radwańska in the quarterfinals. At the China Open in Beijing, Wozniacki defeated Chanelle Scheepers and Hsieh Su-wei but lost to Angelique Kerber in the third round. Wozniacki's next tournament was the Kremlin Cup. As the third seed in the tournament, she defeated top seed Samantha Stosur in the final in three sets to take home her second title of the year, and 20th overall. At the year-end Tournament of Champions in Sofia, Wozniacki won her three group matches and reached the final but lost to Nadia Petrova. She ended the year ranked 10th.

(Roddick) and (Djokovic) do it all the time and Caro does (it) and now it's racist.??

— Serena Williams responding to the criticism of Wozniacki.

In December 2012, during an exhibition match in Brazil, Wozniacki imitated friend and fellow tennis player Serena Williams by stuffing towels in her shirt and skirt in order to appear to be large-chested and have a large rear end. This act divided opinion on social network sites. It was noted that Wozniacki had done the impression before without controversy. Williams also defended Wozniacki in an email to USA Today and pointed out that they are friends and that the act was not racist. Williams added, however, that if people feel this way, then she should do something else next time.

=== 2013: Continued struggles with form ===
Wozniacki began the year in Brisbane where as the eighth seed, she lost in the first round to qualifier Ksenia Pervak in three sets. Wozniacki then competed at the Sydney International where she defeated Urszula Radwańska but lost to Kuznetsova in the second round. At the Australian Open, Wozniacki defeated Sabine Lisicki, Donna Vekić and Lesia Tsurenko, but once again lost to Kuznetsova, this time in the fourth round.

Her next tournament was the Qatar Ladies Open where she reached the quarterfinals with wins over Mervana Jugić-Salkić, Sorana Cîrstea, Mona Barthel, then lost to Agnieszka Radwańska. In Dubai, Wozniacki defeated Lucie Šafářová, Zheng Jie and Marion Bartoli to reach the semifinals where she lost to the eventual champion, Petra Kvitová. At the Malaysian Open, she lost in the first round to Wang Qiang. She then played in an exhibition match at the BNP Paribas Showdown in Hong Kong. She was scheduled to play Li Na, but she had to withdraw due to injury. Instead Wozniacki played Li's replacement world No. 4 Agnieszka Radwańska and lost in straight sets.

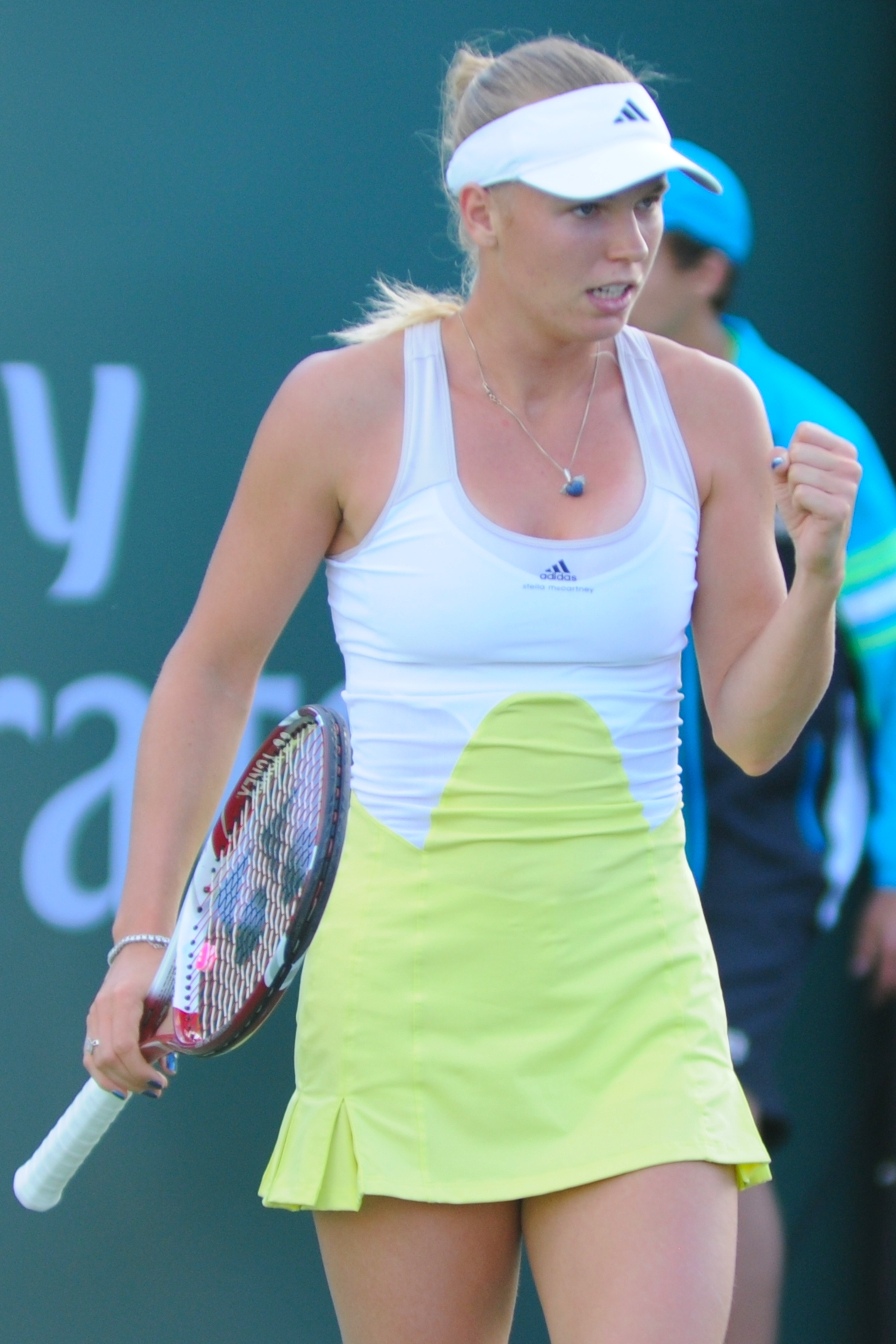
Wozniacki reached her first final of the year at the 2013 Indian Wells Open

At the Indian Wells Open, she defeated Alizé Cornet, Elena Vesnina and Nadia Petrova, then received a walkover when the defending champion Victoria Azarenka withdrew due to a foot injury. In the semifinals, Wozniacki defeated Angelique Kerber to reach her first final of the year but lost the title match to Maria Sharapova. In her next tournament, the Miami Open, Wozniacki made it to the third round where she lost to Garbiñe Muguruza.

Wozniacki began the clay-court season by reaching the quarterfinals of the Family Circle Cup where she lost to Stefanie Vögele. Wozniacki lost in the first round to Carla Suárez Navarro in Stuttgart, to Yaroslava Shvedova in Madrid, to Bojana Jovanovski in Rome, and to Zheng Jie in Brussels. At the French Open, Wozniacki defeated Laura Robson in the first round, then lost again to Jovanovski in the second.

She began grass-court season at Eastbourne where she reached semifinals with victories over Tamira Paszek, Laura Robson and Ekaterina Makarova but then lost to qualifier Jamie Hampton. In the first round of Wimbledon, Wozniacki beat Estrella Cabeza Candela. In the second round, she faced Petra Cetkovská. In just the fourth game of the first set, with the score at 2–1 and going with serve, Wozniacki slipped and fell, injuring her ankle. She received treatment but was visibly struggling and went on to lose the match. Wozniacki was one of several players to slip and injure themselves, including Jo-Wilfried Tsonga, Victoria Azarenka and Maria Sharapova. After the match, Wozniacki questioned whether the preparation for the tournament was the same as in previous years, adding: "I just know that it's just not really fun to be out there when you feel like you can't really push off on your foot."

Wozniacki's woeful season continued at the Rogers Cup, where she fell in the second round to Sorana Cîrstea despite having double match point in the second set. She then reached the quarterfinals of the Western & Southern Open, beating Peng Shuai, Monica Niculescu and Petra Kvitová, but was defeated by Victoria Azarenka for the first time since 2009. Wozniacki then played at the New Haven Open at Yale. She reached the semifinals beating Peng via retirement, Karin Knapp and Sloane Stephens, then lost to Simona Halep in straight sets. At the US Open, Wozniacki defeated Duan Yingying and Chanelle Scheepers in straight sets, then lost to qualifier Camila Giorgi in the third round. This marked the first time since 2008 where Wozniacki had failed to reach the quarterfinals or better at one of the four Grand Slam tournaments.

During the Asian swing, she advanced to the semifinals of the Pan Pacific Open, defeating Flavia Pennetta, Magdaléna Rybáriková and Lucie Šafářová en route, then losing to Angelique Kerber. Her next tournament was in Beijing where she was seeded sixth and where she received a bye into the second round along with the other three Tokyo semifinalists. Wozniacki reached the quarterfinals with wins over Monica Niculescu and Sloane Stephens, but lost to the world No. 1 and eventual champion Serena Williams.

Wozniacki's final event for the year was the Luxembourg Open, where she was top-seeded. She ended her two-match losing streak against Bojana Jovanovski by defeating the Serb in a three set quarterfinal. She then beat Wimbledon finalist Sabine Lisicki to reach the final and defeated Annika Beck of Germany in straight sets to win her first and only title of the year. Despite the victory, Wozniacki failed to qualify for the year-ending Tour Championships in Istanbul as Angelique Kerber secured the final spot with her win at the WTA International tournament in Linz, Austria that same week. In winning Luxembourg, however, Wozniacki qualified for the Tournament of Champions in Sofia but ultimately chose not to participate. She finished the year ranked world No. 10.

=== 2014: Resurgence and second major final ===
During the off season, Wozniacki switched her racquet make from Yonex to Babolat. She was scheduled to start the season in Brisbane but withdrew due to a right shoulder injury and instead began her season in Sydney where she defeated Julia Görges in three sets, then lost to Lucie Šafářová in the second round. At the Australian Open, she lost to Garbiñe Muguruza in the third round, in three sets.

Wozniacki competed at the Qatar Ladies Open where she was seeded eighth and where she lost to Yanina Wickmayer. The following week, she reached the semifinals in Dubai, defeating Sabine Lisicki, Annika Beck and Sorana Cîrstea before falling to the eventual champion Venus Williams.

Her next tournament was the Indian Wells Open where she was defending runner-up points. She reached the fourth round following wins over Bojana Jovanovski and Yaroslava Shvedova, then lost to Jelena Janković, causing her to fall to world No. 18, her lowest ranking since 2010. She recovered by reaching the quarterfinals of the Miami Open, recording wins over Monica Puig, Sloane Stephens and Varvara Lepchenko before losing to Li Na. Wozniacki made her debut at the Monterry Open, where she defeated CoCo Vandeweghe, Kristina Mladenovic and Karolína Plíšková en route to the semifinals, then lost to the eventual champion Ana Ivanovic.

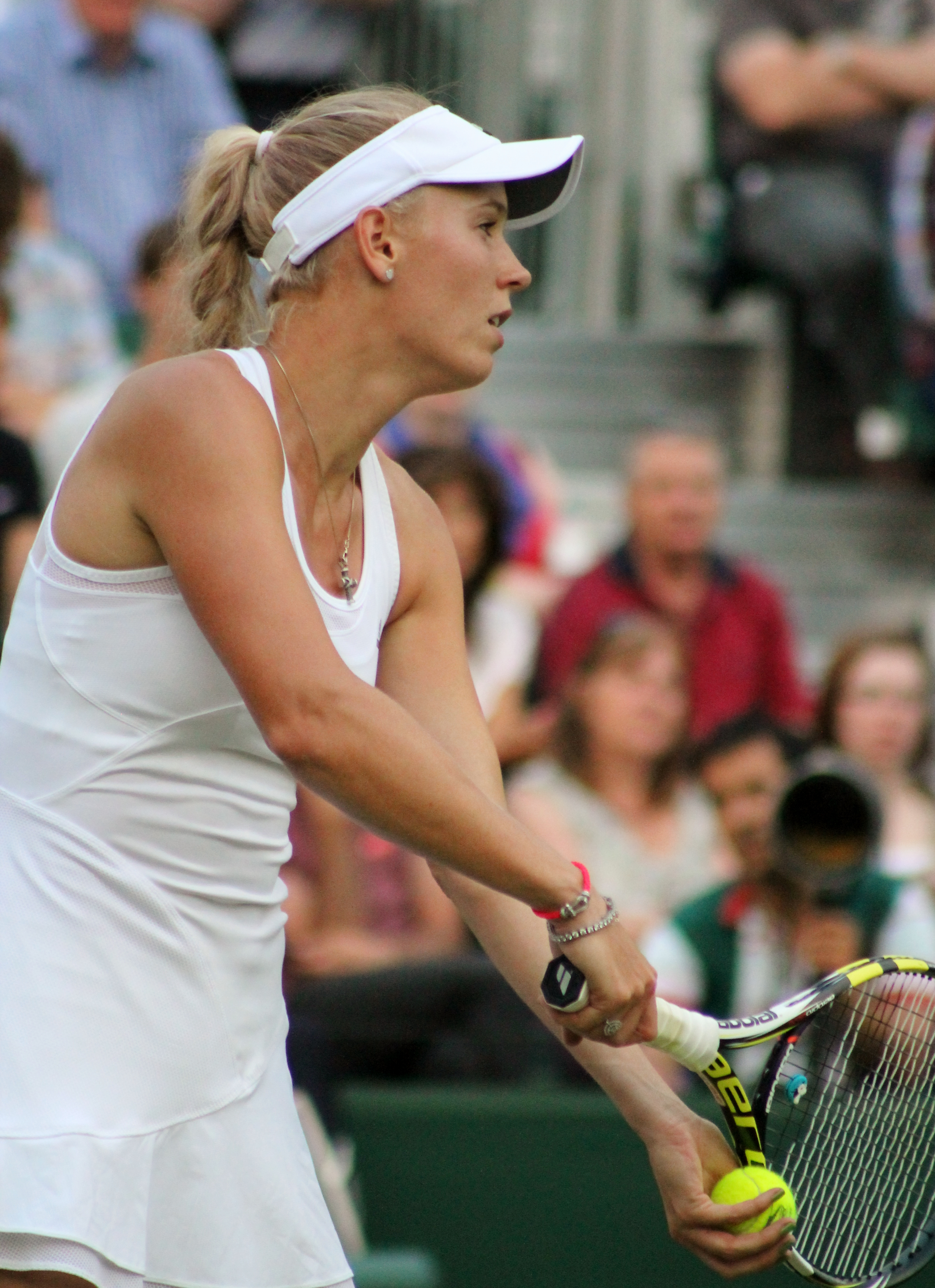
Wozniacki serving at the 2014 Wimbledon Championships

Her first tournament of the clay-court season was scheduled to be the Stuttgart Grand Prix, but she was forced to withdraw due to a left wrist injury. Instead, her first event on clay was the Madrid Open where she reached the second round, beating Ekaterina Makarova and then losing to Roberta Vinci when sustaining a knee injury. This same injury caused her to withdraw from the following week's Internazionali d'Italia in Rome. At the French Open, Wozniacki was upset by Yanina Wickmayer in the first round in three sets.

Wozniacki enjoyed a stellar grass-court season during which she made the semifinals of the Eastbourne International with wins over Samantha Stosur, Sloane Stephens and Camila Giorgi, then lost to the eventual finalist Angelique Kerber. At the Wimbledon Championships, Wozniacki reached the fourth round for the fourth time in her career with straight-sets wins over Shahar Pe'er, Naomi Broady and Ana Konjuh, but ultimately lost to Barbora Záhlavová-Strýcová.

Wozniacki won her first title of the year at the İstanbul Cup. She defeated Belinda Bencic, Karin Knapp, Karolína Plíšková, Kristina Mladenovic, and Roberta Vinci to secure the title.

Her first tournament of the 2014 US Open Series was Rogers Cup. She progressed to the quarterfinals with straight-set wins over Daniela Hantuchová, Klára Koukalová and Shelby Rogers, then lost to top seed Serena Williams. At the Western & Southern Open, she beat Magdaléna Rybáriková and Zhang Shuai, Angelique Kerber, and Agnieszka Radwańska. In the semifinals, she fell in three sets to the eventual champion Williams.

Wozniacki's next tournament was the US Open, where she was the tenth seed. She faced Magdaléna Rybáriková in her opening match, progressing when her opponent was forced to retire early in the third set. She then beat qualifier Aliaksandra Sasnovich in the second round in straight sets. In the third round she easily took care of 18th seed Andrea Petkovic in straight sets for her first win over a seeded player at a grand slam since 2012. In the fourth round, Wozniacki came up against former world No. 1 and former champion Maria Sharapova, defeating her in three sets to progress to the quarterfinals of a grand slam for the first time since the 2012 Australian Open. In the quarterfinals, she dropped just one game to breeze past Sara Errani. In the semifinals, Wozniacki came up against unseeded Peng Shuai. Wozniacki was up a set when her opponent was forced to retire due to a severe heat-related illness, allowing Wozniacki to advance to her second Grand Slam final, and her first since the 2009 US Open. In the final, Wozniacki came up against two-time defending champion Serena Williams for the third time in four weeks, again falling to the world No. 1. Due to her run to the final, Wozniacki returned to the top 10 for the first time since February.

During the fall, she competed at the Pan Pacific Open. As the second seed, she received a bye into the second round where she faced Australian qualifier Jarmila Gajdošová. Wozniacki rallied from a set down to prevail. In the quarterfinals, she faced Carla Suárez Navarro, whom she easily defeated to progress to the semifinals. In a grueling match against unseeded Spaniard Garbiñe Muguruza whom she had never beaten, Wozniacki won in three sets to set up a clash with Ana Ivanovic. In her third final of the year, Wozniacki fell to the Serbian in straight sets. Wozniacki's next tournament was the Wuhan Open. As the eighth seed, she received a bye into the second round, where she defeated Carla Suárez Navarro in three sets. Wozniacki then beat Casey Dellacqua and Timea Bacsinszky to reach the semifinals but then lost to Eugenie Bouchard in straight sets.

The following week, she competed at the China Open where she received a bye into the second round due to being a semifinalist in Wuhan. She was eliminated by Samantha Stosur in her opening match of the tournament. It was then announced on 2 October that Wozniacki had qualified for the WTA Finals.

At the WTA Finals, Wozniacki was drawn into the White Group alongside Sharapova, Kvitová and Radwańska. In her first match she beat Maria Sharapova in three sets. She then went on to beat Agnieszka Radwańska in straight sets. With Sharapova winning in three sets against Radwańska, Wozniacki qualified into the semifinals. She then beat Kvitová in straight sets going undefeated in her round robin matches. She would lose to Serena Williams in the semifinals in three sets despite serving for the match in the third set and leading 4–1 in the third set tiebreak. She finished the year ranked at No. 8.

Wozniacki then decided to run the New York City Marathon in November 2014. She recorded a time of 3 hours, 26 minutes and 33 seconds. She claimed that the running training was positive for her and contributed to her good performances at the US Open and WTA Finals.

=== 2015: Out of top 10 year-end ranking ===
Wozniacki started her season at the Auckland Open seeded as No. 1 and advanced to the final, then lost to Venus Williams in three sets. Despite being seeded eighth at the Australian Open, Wozniacki was unfortunate to draw fellow former world number one and two-time champion Victoria Azarenka in the second round, and was defeated in straight sets. After the tournament, she climbed back up to No. 5. Wozniacki then competed at the Dubai Tennis Championships where she made it all the way to the semifinals, then lost to eventual champion Simona Halep in three sets. Wozniacki's next tournament was the Qatar Open where she was seeded second. However, she lost once again to fellow former No. 1 Victoria Azarenka in the quarterfinals in straight sets, winning just four games. She rebounded at the Malaysian Open, winning the title by defeating Alexandra Dulgheru in the final in three sets.

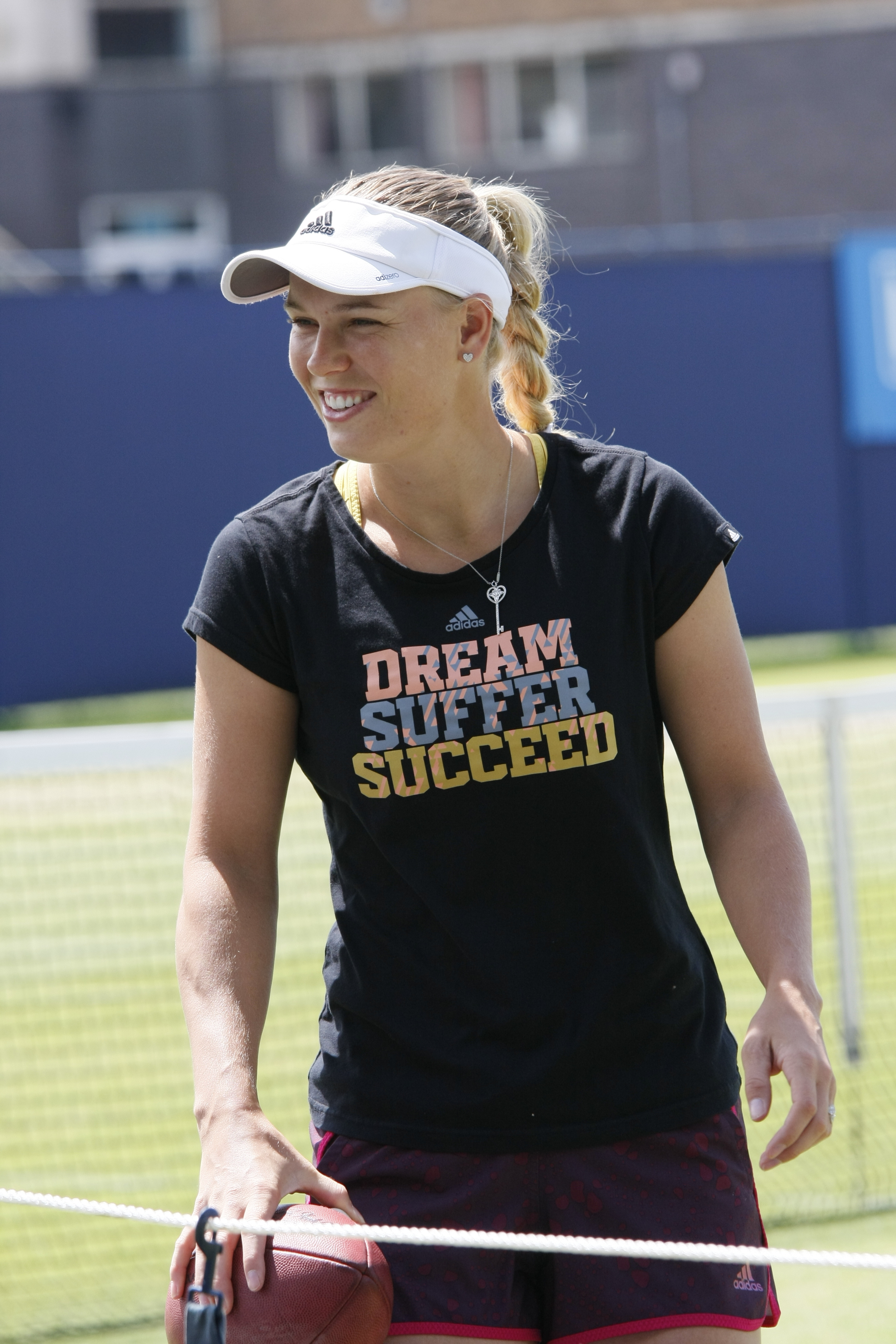
Wozniacki practicing at the 2015 Eastbourne International

Wozniacki's next tournament was the Indian Wells Open where she was seeded fourth. In the second round, she beat Ons Jabeur, then lost in the third round to Belinda Bencic in straight sets. She then competed at the Miami Open beating Madison Brengle in the second round and Kaia Kanepi in the third round. She lost to Venus Williams in the fourth round in straight sets.

Wozniacki started her clay-court season in Stuttgart where she was seeded fourth. In the second round, she beat Lucie Šafářová in straight sets. In the quarterfinals, she dropped just three games against Carla Suárez Navarro to advance to the semifinals. In the semifinals, she beat Simona Halep in a three-set thriller to reach her first clay court final since 2011. She lost to Angelique Kerber in the final in three sets, despite serving for the match in the third set. Wozniacki's next tournament was the Mutua Madrid Open where she made it to the quarterfinals for the first time since 2009 beating Jarmila Gajdošová, Christina McHale and Agnieszka Radwańska. She lost in the quarterfinals to Maria Sharapova in three sets. Wozniacki's next tournament was the Italian Open. She lost in the second round to Victoria Azarenka for the third time in straight sets. Wozniacki then played at the French Open as the fifth seed. She beat Karin Knapp in straight sets, then lost to Julia Görges in the second round in straight sets.

At the Eastbourne International, she beat Jarmila Gajdošová in straight sets and Svetlana Kuznetsova in three sets to advance to the quarterfinals. She beat Andrea Petkovic in straight sets to advance to the semifinals where she faced Belinda Bencic. She retired from the match due to a back injury after losing the first three games. Wozniacki then played at Wimbledon as the fifth seed. She beat Zheng Saisai, Denisa Allertová, and Camila Giorgi to advance to the fourth round and then lost to eventual finalist Garbiñe Muguruza, in straight sets. Despite the loss, Wozniacki climbed back up to No. 4.

Her summer hardcourt season got off to a slow start due to an ankle injury. This injury caused her to lose early at Stanford, Toronto and Cincinnati to Varvara Lepchenko, Belinda Bencic and Victoria Azarenka, respectively. Wozniacki then played at the Connecticut Open. She finally picked up her first win by crushing Alison Riske in the first round. She then beat Roberta Vinci in three sets, saving three match points in the third-set tiebreak, to advance to the quarterfinals. She breezed past Caroline Garcia, then lost in the semifinals to Petra Kvitová in straight sets. Wozniacki then played at the US Open as the fourth seed. She easily beat Jamie Loeb in her opening match to advance to the second round where she was upset by Petra Cetkovská in a close three-set match despite having four match points.

Wozniacki began her Asian hardcourt swing at the Pan Pacific Open. As the top seed, she received a bye in to the second round where she easily beat Ana Konjuh. She then defeated Angelique Kerber in three sets in the quarterfinals. In the semifinals, she lost to Belinda Bencic for the fourth straight time in straight sets. Wozniacki's next tournament was the Wuhan Open. She lost to Anna Karolína Schmiedlová in the second round in three sets, despite being up a set and a break. Wozniacki's next tournament was the China Open. She beat Bojana Jovanovski in the first round, and won ten games in a row to beat Wang Qiang to advance to the third round. She lost to Angelique Kerber in straight sets. The loss ended Wozniacki's chances to qualify for the WTA Finals.

Her next tournament was the Ladies Linz where she beat Mirjana Lučić-Baroni in three sets, then lost to Kirsten Flipkens in the second round in straight sets. She failed to qualify for the WTA Finals, but did qualify for the Elite Trophy where she was drawn into Group D alongside Roberta Vinci and Svetlana Kuznetsova. After retiring in her first match against Svetlana Kuznetsova, Wozniacki withdrew from the tournament. She finished the year ranked at No. 17, her worst year-end ranking since 2007.

=== 2016: Early injuries and revival ===
Wozniacki began her 2016 season at the Auckland Open, where she was defending finalist points. She beat Danka Kovinić, Christina McHale, and Alexandra Dulgheru to advance to the semifinals where she lost to eventual champion Sloane Stephens in straight sets. Wozniacki's next tournament was the Australian Open where she lost to Yulia Putintseva in the first round in three sets, marking her worst performance at the tournament.

Her next tournament was the St. Petersburg Ladies' Trophy. She lost to Dominika Cibulková in the second round in straight sets. Wozniacki next played the Qatar Ladies Open for which she needed nine match points to beat Ana Konjuh in the first round. She was at one point up by a double break in the third set. In the second round, she faced Daria Gavrilova which she won in straight sets. Wozniacki then played Elena Vesnina in the third round, she fell in a grueling match. Wozniacki played in the Monterrey Open instead of defending her title in Kuala Lumpur. She defeated Olga Govortsova in the first round and Mirjana Lučić-Baroni in the second round; however, she fell in the quarterfinals to the eventual winner Heather Watson. Caroline then played at the BNP Paribas Open and fell in the second round to Zhang Shuai. This match marked the longest match so far in 2016, at 3 hours and 24 minutes. Then in the Miami Open Wozniacki made a promising start, defeating Vania King; however, she fell to 12th seed Elina Svitolina.

Wozniacki was scheduled to play many clay court tournaments, but she injured her ankle during a practice, which put her out for all of the clay-court season. This break saw Wozniacki fall through the rankings from 22 down to 34, the lowest since May 2008. She withdrew from the French Open because her ankle was not 100%.

Wozniacki played in Nottingham, her first tournament since the Miami Open in March and her first tournament after hiring her new coach David Kotyza. She won her first match in ten weeks defeating Çağla Büyükakçay, but falling in yet another three-set match to Anett Kontaveit in the second round. In her last tournament leading up to Wimbledon, Wozniacki played the Eastbourne International. She showed signs of improvement from her loss of form and injury, dismissing Alizé Cornet and seventh seed Sam Stosur and dropping only seven games in the two matches, then lost in a three-set match to qualifier Monica Puig. In Wimbledon, unseeded the first time since 2008 Australian Open, she lost to Svetlana Kuznetsova in the first round, resulting in her falling out of the top 50 for the first time since February 2008.

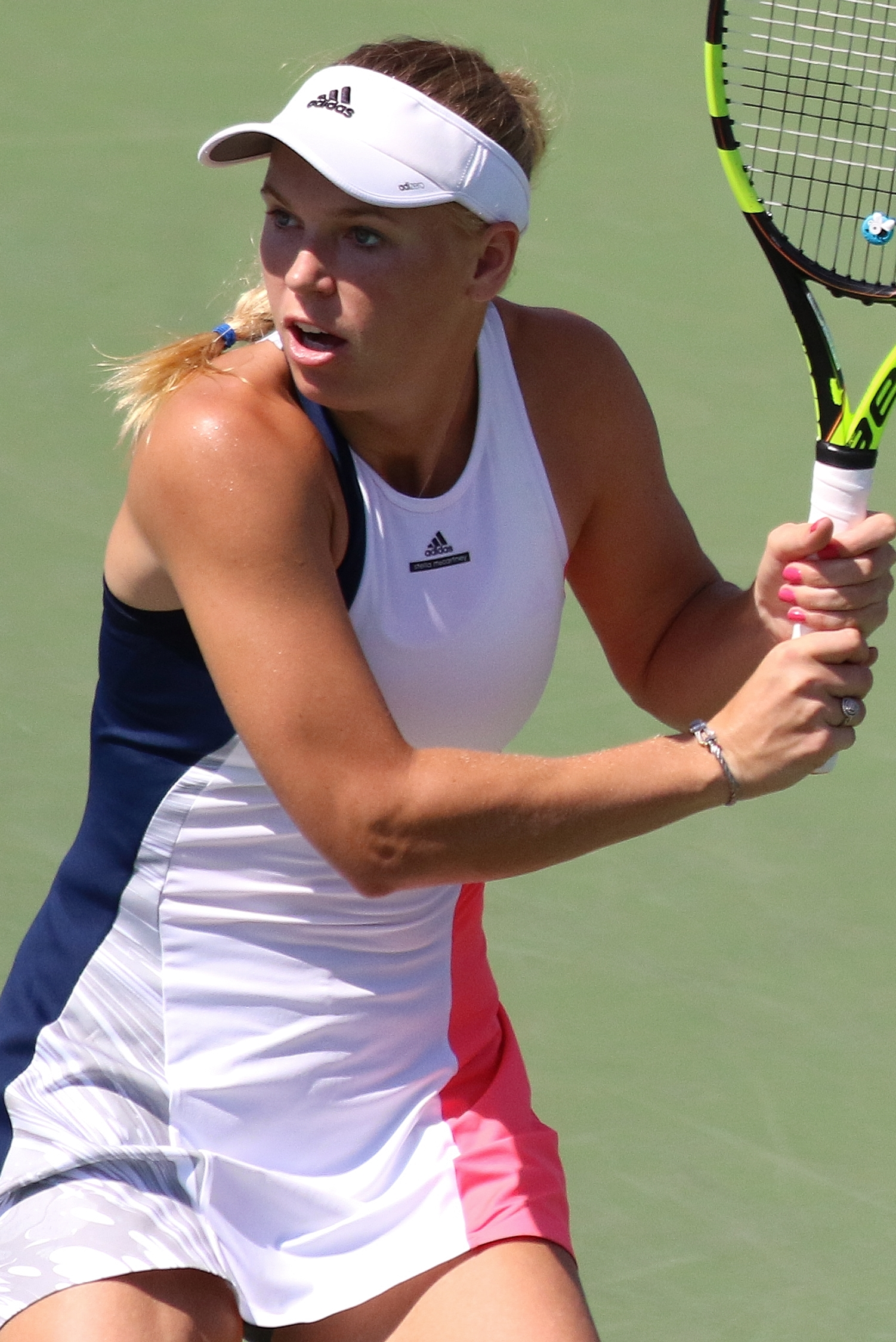
Wozniacki playing at the 2016 US Open

Wozniacki began her US hardcourt season playing the Washington Open. She went on to beat Hiroko Kuwata in the first round and retired in her second-round clash with Sam Stosur despite being up a set 7–5 a sharp pain in her left arm forced her to retire. This injury also took her out of The Rogers Cup. She then played the Summer Olympic Games in Rio at which she was Danish flag bearer. Dropping four games, she beat Lucie Hradecká but fell to Petra Kvitová in the second round. She failed to win a match in the Connecticut Open as she lost in the first round to young Latvian Jeļena Ostapenko. However, Wozniacki's year turned around at the US Open. She slid past Taylor Townsend in three sets, then upset Svetlana Kuznetsova in round two. She then beat Monica Niculescu in two sets to reach the fourth round, in which she upended Madison Keys in two sets to reach the quarterfinals and then beat unseeded Anastasija Sevastova to enter the semifinals. Wozniacki lost the semifinal to then-new No. 1, Angelique Kerber, in two sets, and resulting at the back of the top 30 for the first time since April of this year.

She moved on to the Pan Pacific Open. In the first round, Wozniacki defeated Belinda Bencic, who had defeated her the previous year, in three sets. In the second round, she defeated fourth seed Carla Suárez Navarro, then beat qualifier Magda Linette in straight sets. In the semifinals, Wozniacki defeated defending champion Agnieszka Radwańska, which sent her off to her first final since April of the previous year. In the final, she defeated Japanese player Naomi Osaka to win her 24th WTA Tour title, and her first title since March 2015. This was also Wozniacki's first Premier-level title since 2012.

Wozniacki continued the Asian swing at the Wuhan Open. There, she had a good start, defeating Samantha Stosur in the first round. In the third round, Wozniacki faced Agnieszka Radwańska again, and this time, Radwańska came out on top. Wozniacki then competed at the China Open. She cruised past her first two matches against CoCo Vandeweghe and Roberta Vinci before going head-to-head with Radwańska for the third time in three weeks. Radwańska emerged victorious again, defeating Wozniacki in straight sets.

Wozniacki won her second title of the season and 25th title overall at the Hong Kong Open. She defeated Zheng Saisai, Heather Watson, Wang Qiang, Jelena Janković, and Kristina Mladenovic. This was the first time since 2012 that Wozniacki had won two WTA Tour titles in a single season. With the win, she returned to the top 20.

Wozniacki ended the season with a run at the Luxembourg Open. The No. 2 seed had an easy first-round win against Madison Brengle, and survived a second-round encounter against Sabine Lisicki. She then was forced to retire in the quarterfinals due to sickness. Wozniacki did not play at the WTA Elite Trophy and ended her topsy-turvy season ranked No. 19 (having been as low as No. 74).

=== 2017: WTA Finals crown and return to top 3 ===
Wozniacki began the year at the Auckland Open once again. This time, she was the No. 3 seed. She started out strong, breezing past Nicole Gibbs and Varvara Lepchenko, then lost in the quarterfinals to Julia Görges in three sets, despite being up a set and a break. At the Sydney International, Wozniacki was seeded tenth. She played some solid tennis against Olympic gold medallist Monica Puig, winning in three sets. Wozniacki then defeated Yulia Putintseva in straight sets in a rematch of their 2016 Australian Open first-round clash. In the quarterfinals, she was defeated by Barbora Strýcová in three close sets, despite twice being up a break in the final set.

Wozniacki was seeded 17th at the Australian Open. She reached the third round, defeating Arina Rodionova and Donna Vekić, but lost to Johanna Konta in straight sets.

Wozniacki played at the Qatar Ladies Open sliding past Kiki Bertens and Agnieszka Radwańska in the first two rounds in straight sets. She then saved two set points in the first set to beat Lauren Davis, before dispatching Monica Puig to reach the final. There she fell to the in-form Karolína Plíšková. From there she played at the Dubai Championships, also making the final there by beating Daria Kasatkina, Viktorija Golubic, Kateryna Bondarenko, CiCi Bellis and Anastasija Sevastova, respectively, before losing to Elina Svitolina in straight sets in the final. Despite runner-up finishes, Wozniacki rose back up to No. 14.

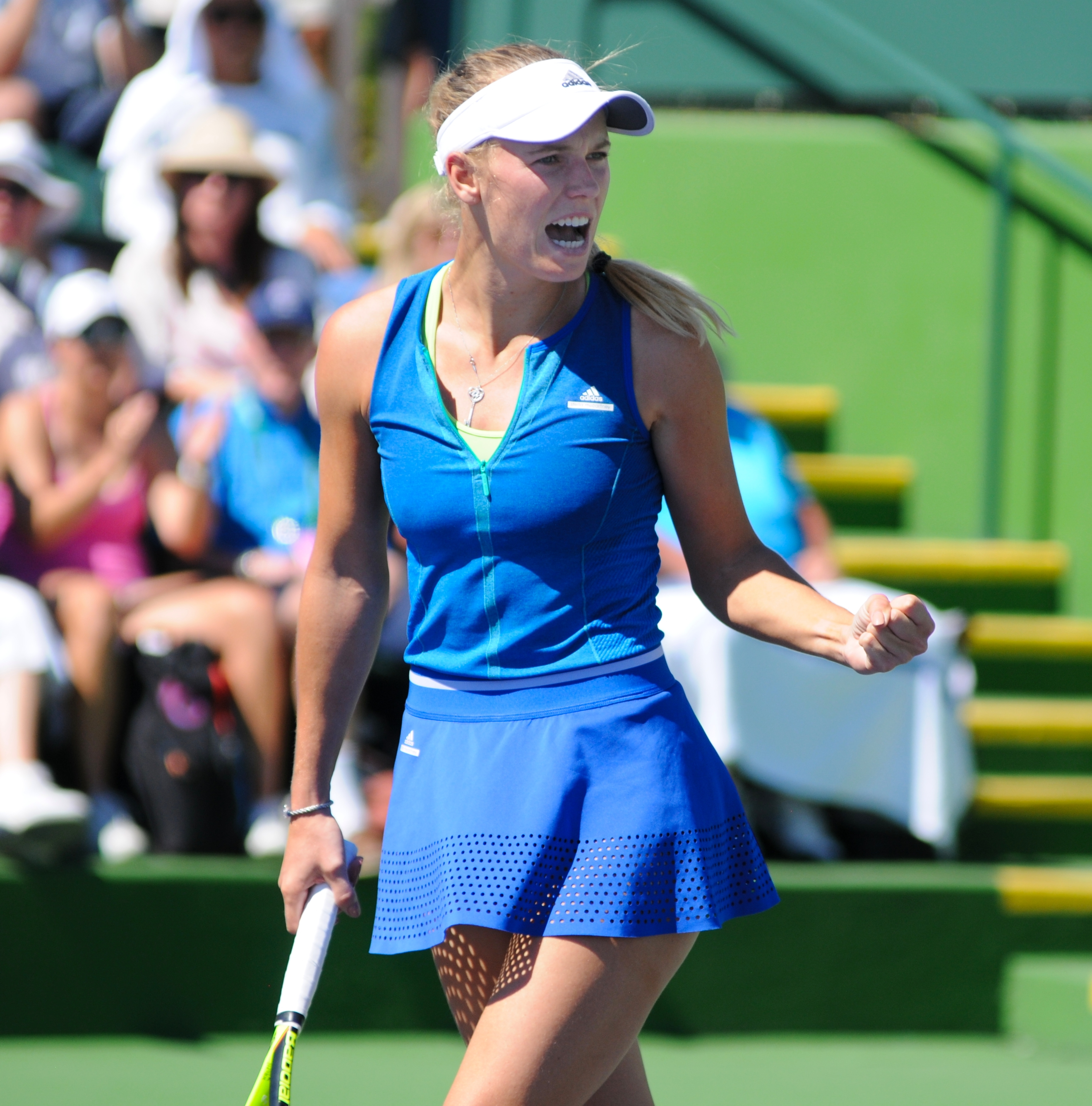
Wozniacki during the 2017 Indian Wells Open

At the Indian Wells Open, Wozniacki beat Magda Linette, Kateřina Siniaková and Madison Keys, not losing a set, to advance to the quarterfinals where she lost to Kristina Mladenovic. At the Miami Open, she beat Varvara Lepchenko and Sorana Cîrstea in straight sets and then advanced to the quarterfinals with a retirement from Garbiñe Muguruza. In the quarterfinals, she beat Lucie Šafářová in straight sets and in the semifinals, avenged her Doha loss to Karolína Plíšková by beating her in three sets to advance to her first ever final in Miami and her first Premier Mandatory final since 2013. She lost in straight sets to Johanna Konta.

Wozniacki began her clay court season at the Charleston Open. She made it to the quarterfinals with straight-set wins over Annika Beck and Anastasia Rodionova. There she lost to Jeļena Ostapenko in straight sets. She next played at the Prague Open, beat Misaki Doi in the first round in straight sets, and lost to Ostapenko again in three sets despite having match point. Wozniacki next played at the Madrid Open. In the first round, she beat Monica Niculescu in three sets, then lost to Carla Suárez Navarro in three sets. In Strasbourg, Wozniacki retired from her first match against Shelby Rogers. Wozniacki then played at the French Open as the 11th seed. She beat Jaimee Fourlis in the first round in three sets, then beat Françoise Abanda without the loss of a game. In the third round, she beat CiCi Bellis, in three sets, and then went on to beat former champion Svetlana Kuznetsova, in three sets, to advance to the quarterfinals for the first time since 2010. She lost to eventual champion Jeļena Ostapenko for the third time in three sets.

Wozniacki began her grass-court season at the Eastbourne International with straight-set wins over Naomi Osaka and Elena Vesnina. In the quarterfinals, she came from a set and a double break down to beat Simona Halep and proceeded to beat Heather Watson in three sets to advance to her fourth final of the year where she lost to Karolína Plíšková in straight sets. She then played at Wimbledon as the fifth seed. She beat Tímea Babos in three sets, recovering from a break down and grass court specialist Tsvetana Pironkova in straight sets. She then beat Anett Kontaveit in a come-from-behind three-set win which saw Kontaveit fail to serve for the match twice to advance to the fourth round for the sixth time. She lost to CoCo Vandeweghe in straight sets.

Wozniacki competed in the Swedish Open and she made her fifth final of the year, beating Pauline Parmentier, Viktorija Golubic, Kateryna Kozlova and Elise Mertens before falling to Kateřina Siniaková in the final. She began her hardcourt season in Rogers Cup in Toronto. Here she won her first ever match in Toronto defeating Ekaterina Alexandrova later in the quarterfinals she defeated the current world No. 1 for the first time, overcoming Karolina Plíšková in three sets. Wozniacki eventually made her sixth final of 2017 yet again falling at this stage, this time to Elina Svitolina. This tipped Wozniacki back into the top 5. She then competed in the Cincinnati Open defeating Elena Vesnina and Ashleigh Barty, before falling in the quarterfinals to world No. 1, Karolina Plíšková. At the US Open, she defeated Mihaela Buzărnescu, then lost to Ekaterina Makarova in the second round.

She then played at the Pan Pacific Open, where she defended her title by defeating Shelby Rogers, Dominika Cibulková, Garbiñe Muguruza and Anastasia Pavlyuchenkova. At the Wuhan Open, she lost her opening match to Maria Sakkari. At the China Open, she lost in the third round to Petra Kvitová, in straight sets. At the Hong Kong Open, she won her first-round match against Eugenie Bouchard but withdrew from her next match.

At the WTA Finals, Wozniacki beat Elina Svitolina for the first time after losing to her twice in finals. She then defeated the world No. 1, Simona Halep, in straight sets. In her third and final match of round robin play, she was defeated by Caroline Garcia in three sets. Nonetheless, she still made the semifinals. In the semifinals, she beat Karolína Plíšková in straight sets to advance to the final for the first time since 2010, where she finished runner-up. In the final, she beat Venus Williams for the first time to win the biggest title of her career. By virtue of her WTA Finals crown, she moved up to world No. 3 where she would finish the season, her highest year-end ranking since 2011.

=== 2018: Australian Open champion and back to No. 1 ===
Wozniacki began her season at the Auckland Open for the fourth straight year. She was the top seed and advanced into the final, but she was defeated by the same opponent she lost to the previous year in the quarterfinals, Julia Görges, in straight sets.

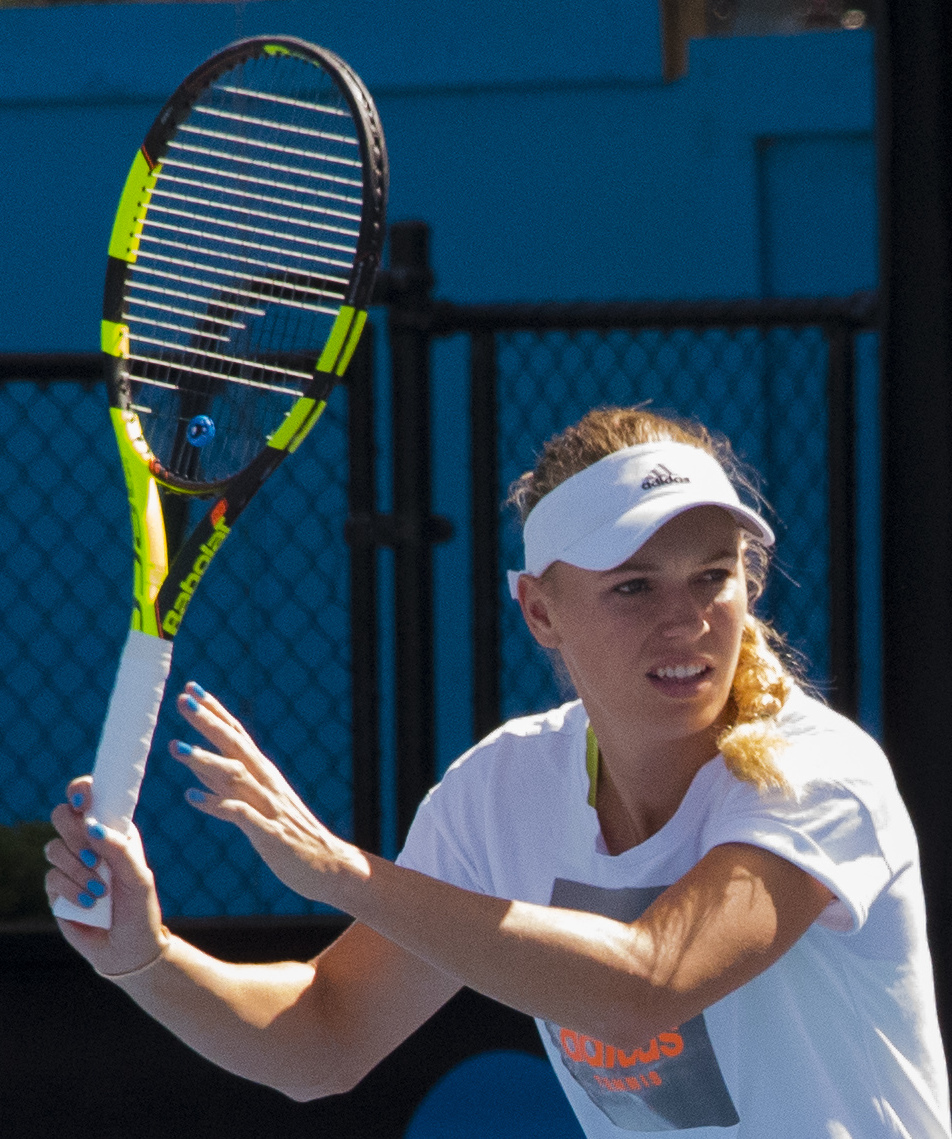
Wozniacki practicing at the 2018 Australian Open

At the Australian Open, Wozniacki was seeded second, her highest seeding since 2012. She defeated Mihaela Buzărnescu in straight sets and then Jana Fett in three, after being down 1–5 in the third set and saving two match points. She then beat Kiki Bertens and Magdaléna Rybáriková both in straight sets to reach the quarterfinals. Beating Carla Suárez Navarro in three sets, she advanced to her second Australian Open semifinal since 2011. In the semifinals, she defeated Elise Mertens in straight sets to advance to her third Grand Slam final and her first since 2014. She then upset top seed and world No. 1 Simona Halep in three sets, to become the ninth woman to win the title after being match point down. By winning her first Grand Slam title, she regained the world No. 1 ranking on 29 January 2018 after a gap of exactly six years, which bested Serena Williams' previous record of five years 29 days.

Her next tournament was the St. Petersburg Trophy, which she entered in the second round. She defeated Anastasia Potapova, then lost to Daria Kasatkina in the quarterfinals. She then played the Qatar Ladies Open and reached the semifinals by defeating Carina Witthöft, Monica Niculescu and Angelique Kerber. However, she lost to the eventual champion Petra Kvitová in three sets, despite having three match points. With her Qatar performance, Caroline Wozniacki became only the fourth player in WTA history to surpass $30,000,000 in career prize earnings.

Wozniacki then played the Indian Wells Open, for which she received a bye in the first round. She defeated Lara Arruabarrena and Aliaksandra Sasnovich in straight sets and three sets, respectively, then lost to eventual finalist Daria Kasatkina again in the fourth round. A week later, she entered the Miami Open, where she also received a bye in the first round. However, she lost to the Summer Olympics champion Monica Puig in three sets.

Wozniacki began her clay-court swing at the İstanbul Cup where she made the quarterfinals defeating Ekaterina Alexandrova and Sara Errani before retiring against Pauline Parmentier. She then played in the Madrid Open where she easily beat Daria Gavrilova and escaping Ashleigh Barty, then lost to the eventual finalist Kiki Bertens in straight sets. Heading to Rome for the first time in three years, Wozniacki made the quarterfinals. There she received a first round bye then defeating Alison Van Uytvanck and Anastasija Sevastova but got defeated by an in form Anett Kontaveit. In the French Open, she made it to the fourth round. However, she lost to Daria Kasatkina in straight sets after the match was interrupted for bad light.

She played at Eastbourne, where she went one better than last year winning the title; she convincingly beat Camila Giorgi in round two. Next she got her first-ever win over Johanna Konta and then defeated Ashleigh Barty in the quarterfinals. Wozniacki then went on to save a match point to outlast Angelique Kerber to make her 53rd WTA final. In the final, she beat Aryna Sabalenka in two tight sets to win her 29th title of her career. The final marked her 600th career match-win. At Wimbledon, Wozniacki lost in second round to Ekaterina Makarova, after saving five match points.

Wozniacki was scheduled to start her 2018 US Open Series in Washington, but withdrew due to a right leg injury. Instead, she played in the Canadian Open, where she received a bye in the first round. However, she lost to Aryna Sabalenka in three sets despite having three match points. One week later, in Cincinnati, she retired against Kiki Bertens in her first match of the tournament because of a left knee injury. In the US Open, Wozniacki defeated 2011 champion Samantha Stosur in straight sets, then lost to Lesia Tsurenko in the second round.

Coming into the East Asian season, Wozniacki participated in the Pan Pacific Open as the defending champion, but she lost to Camila Giorgi in three sets in the second round after receiving a bye. Then in Wuhan, Wozniacki was upset by Monica Puig for the second time this season in straight sets in the third round. A week later, in Beijing, Wozniacki won her second China Open title without losing a set. With her performance in China, she became the fifth player to secure Singapore spot.

Wozniacki entered the WTA Finals as second seed and defending champion, and was drawn in the White Group. She was upset in straight sets in her first round robin match by seventh seed Karolína Plíšková, then defeated fourth seed Petra Kvitová in three sets. She was then defeated in three sets by sixth seed Elina Svitolina, ending her title defense. Shortly after, she revealed she had been diagnosed with rheumatoid arthritis before the US Open.

=== 2019: Playing with injuries ===
Wozniacki began her season at the Auckland Open for the fifth straight year, but she was upset in the second round by Bianca Andreescu. In Melbourne, she made to the third round but lost to Maria Sharapova in three sets. Due to viral illness, she withdrew from Doha and Dubai, which dropped her out of the top ten.

In Indian Wells, she lost to Ekaterina Alexandrova in three tight sets. In Miami, she made it to the fourth round by beating Aliaksandra Sasnovich and Monica Niculescu, but lost to Hsieh Su-wei in three sets. In April, she began her clay court season by making the final at the Charleston Open, but lost to Madison Keys in two tough sets. Wozniacki ended her season without winning a title for the first time since 2007. On 6 December 2019, she announced that she would retire from professional tennis after the 2020 Australian Open in January.

=== 2020–2022: Australian series: Farewell tour ===
Wozniacki reached the semifinals of the 2020 Auckland Open, beating Paige Hourigan, Lauren Davis and Julia Görges, before losing to eventual runner-up Jessica Pegula in the semifinals. She and good friend Serena Williams, playing doubles together for the only time in their careers, lost in the final to Asia Muhammad and Taylor Townsend.

Her farewell tournament was the Australian Open where she bowed out in the third round in a loss to Ons Jabeur. A special farewell match was decided to be held in May 2020 in the large Royal Arena in Copenhagen; however, due to COVID-19, it was delayed until April 2022.

=== 2023–2024: Return to tennis, WTA 1000 quarterfinal ===
In June 2023, Wozniacki announced in a first-person essay in Vogue her return to pro tennis, starting in the North American summer hardcourt swing. She accepted main draw wildcards for two big warm-up events in Montreal and Cincinnati before heading to New York for the US Open. At the US Open, Wozniacki reached the fourth round, where she lost to eventual champion Coco Gauff, in three sets. She later confirmed that she would not be playing in any tournaments for the remainder of the 2023 season, eyeing a return at the 2024 Australian Open where she subsequently reached the second round.

At the WTA 1000 Indian Wells Open, Wozniacki reached the quarterfinals (her first since returning to tour) defeating Zhu Lin, 25th seed Donna Vekić, Katie Volynets and the returning Angelique Kerber. She lost to world No. 1, Iga Świątek, retiring in the second set with an injury. At the Miami Open, Wozniacki made a promising start, beating Clara Burel convincingly in straight sets. She then, however, lost to Anhelina Kalinina in the second round, having been a set and a match point up.

Following a disappointing clay court season, in which she played only two tournaments in Charleston and Madrid, reaching only the 2nd and 1st round, respectively, Wozniacki failed to qualify for the main draw of the 2024 French Open and was not awarded a wildcard, a decision which was met with outrage by her father, Piotr, causing controversy in the run up to the event. On June 14 she received one of the two Olympic wildcards reserved for former Grand Slam champions, thus entering her into the women's singles competition at the 2024 Summer Olympics. The other went to Naomi Osaka. Furthermore, Wozniacki expressed plans to partner with fellow Dane Holger Rune for the mixed doubles event.

Following a first-round loss to Elise Mertens at the 2024 Birmingham Classic, her first grass-court tournament since her comeback, Wozniacki made a strong showing in Bad Homburg, reaching the quarterfinals after wins over seventh seed Elina Svitolina and Veronika Kudermetova. In her match with third seed Emma Navarro she injured her knee and was forced to retire in the third set. Despite this, she re-entered the top 100 of the WTA rankings at No. 91 on July 1, the start of the 2024 Wimbledon Championships, where she reached the third round, before falling to Elena Rybakina, having defeated Alycia Parks and 30th seed Leylah Fernandez.

At the Olympics in Paris, Wozniacki reached the second round after a three-set victory over Mayar Sherif, but lost to Danielle Collins also in three sets.

After reaching the second round in Cincinnati, where she lost to Anastasia Pavlyuchenkova, Wozniacki made it back to back round of 16 appearances at the US Open, defeating qualifier Nao Hibino, Renata Zarazúa, and Jessika Ponchet in straight sets, dropping a total of only 12 games across all three matches. She then lost to 22nd seed Beatriz Haddad Maia in a tight three-set match, showing flashes of her absolute best to save multiple match points, even bringing up break-back points, before Haddad Maia eventually served out for the victory. Despite this, Wozniacki had defended all her points from the previous edition of the tournament, maintaining a ranking of 73.

Wozniacki did not compete during the 2025 season and later announced that she and her husband, former NBA player David Lee, were expecting their third child. After giving birth in July 2025, speculation remained over whether she would use her protected ranking to return to the WTA Tour. However, in November 2025, Wozniacki indicated that she was likely finished with professional tennis. Speaking on the Nothing Major podcast, she stated that returning for a second comeback was "probably a no", citing her desire to spend more time with her three young children and pursue television work, although she stopped short of formally announcing her retirement and added "never say never" regarding a potential future return.

== Playing style ==
Wozniacki is a defensive baseliner, known for her counterpunching style of play; upon her retirement in 2020, she was described by The Guardian as "one of the most defensive players to ever reach No. 1". As her game is centered around the retrieval of balls with devastating consistency, her greatest assets on court are her movement, speed, court coverage, aggressive footwork, anticipation, balance, and stamina. Due to the fact that her game is based almost solely on defense, she was referred to as a pusher by critics, and is criticised for her reactive playing style, and lack of major weapons. Wozniacki responded to criticism of her defensive playing style by saying: "If I don't have a weapon, then what do the others have? Since I'm No. 1, I must do something right."

Wozniacki's greatest weapon is her two-handed backhand, which she uses to turn defence into offence. Her backhand is hit flat, and is noted for its consistent depth, pace, and penetration; she is known for her backhand down-the-line. Throughout her career, Wozniacki's weakest shot is her forehand, noted for its lack of depth, power, and speed. Her forehand has showed no significant improvements throughout her career; this was attributed to her stubborn refusal to drop her father, Piotr Woźniacki, as her coach. To compensate for her forehand's relative weakness, she frequently utilises the moonball, a slow, high-looping shot, to push opponents far behind the baseline, and to allow her to create opportunities to attack with her aggressive backhand. Her use of the moonball was noted by tennis journalist Tumaini Carayol, who stated that she "ushered in the return" of this shot.

Wozniacki is known for her powerful first serve, which was recorded as high as 118 mph (190 km/h); this allows her to serve aces, and dictate play from the first stroke of a point. This is considered incongruous with her weak forehand; as noted in the Guardian, "people questioned why her serve could scale 118mph and yet her forehand could not crack open an egg". Her second serve is notably weaker, and has been frequently attacked by aggressive returners. Wozniacki is known for her return game, neutralising powerful first serves and attacking weak second serves; this allows her to dominate play from a defensive position. Throughout her career, Wozniacki has typically approached the net only to retrieve short balls, and rarely chooses to finish points at the net. Alongside her defensive skills, further strengths include her mental fortitude, determination, and competitive spirit. Wozniacki stated that she prefers hard and grass courts; she likes hard courts due to the regularity of the bounce, whereas the fast pace of grass courts allows her to defend effectively. She dislikes clay courts, as she finds sliding awkward, and felt that the slow pace inhibited her movement. She has experienced her greatest success on hard courts, where she won 24 of her 30 singles titles.

== Coaching ==
Wozniacki's father, Piotr, was her primary coach since she was 14. Throughout the years, she was coached by Sven Groeneveld through the Adidas Player Development Program. She was briefly coached by Ricardo Sanchez and Thomas Johansson. In October 2013, she hired Thomas Högstedt, but parted ways in January 2014. In the same month, she hired Michael Mortensen, but cut ties with him in March 2014. Since then, Wozniacki decided to be coached again by her father Piotr for the rest of her career.

== Endorsements ==
In 2007, Wozniacki signed an endorsement deal with Adidas, who sponsored her for clothing, footwear, and apparel throughout her career; she previously wore Nike clothing and footwear. In 2009, she became an endorser for the line of tennis apparel designed by Stella McCartney for Adidas. She wore her first 'Adidas by Stella McCartney' tennis dress at the 2009 US Open, and would go on to wear McCartney's designs throughout the rest of her career. For the majority of her career, Wozniacki was endorsed by Babolat for racquets, using the Pure Aero racquet on court. From 2011 to 2013, she signed an endorsement deal with Yonex for racquets, using the Yonex VCORE racquet. From 2014, Wozniacki began to use the Babolat Pure Aero again. On 20 December 2010, she signed a three-year deal to endorse Turkish Airlines' business class service. In 2012, Wozniacki became an endorser of Compeed BlisterPatch. In 2015, Wozniacki became an endorser of Godiva Chocolatier. In 2018, she entered into a partnership with Lympo, a healthy lifestyle motivation app. Other sponsorship partners included Rolex, USANA, The Players' Tribune and Mundipharma.

According to the June 2011 edition of SportsPro, Wozniacki was the world's ninth-most marketable athlete. According to Forbes in 2011, Wozniacki was the second-highest-earning female athlete in the world. In 2018, Forbes ranked her Number 8 in their "Most Powerful Women in International Sports" list.

== Personal life ==
=== Outside tennis ===
Wozniacki's best friend is fellow Danish tennis player Malou Ejdesgaard, who was her doubles partner in five tournaments. Wozniacki is also close friends with Serena Williams, Agnieszka Radwańska, Urszula Radwańska, and Angelique Kerber. Wozniacki is a keen football fan and an avid supporter of Liverpool F.C.

In 2017, Wozniacki posed nude for ESPN's The Body Issue magazine.

=== Relationships ===
Wozniacki was in a relationship with Northern Irish professional golfer Rory McIlroy from 2011 until 2014. She announced their engagement via Twitter on 1 January 2014. On 21 May 2014, it was announced that McIlroy had ended the engagement: "The problem is mine. The wedding invitations issued at the weekend made me realise that I wasn't ready for all that marriage entails. I wish Caroline all the happiness she deserves and thank her for the great times we've had." Wozniacki later revealed that McIlroy had ended the relationship through a brief phone call and had not contacted her since.

On 14 February 2017, Valentine's Day, Wozniacki revealed on her social media accounts that she was in a relationship with former NBA basketball player David Lee, later being confirmed by her family. The couple got engaged on 2 November 2017. Wozniacki married Lee on 16 June 2019 at the luxury resort of Castiglion del Bosco, which is near Montalcino in Tuscany. Serena Williams was one of her bridesmaids and Angelique Kerber, Agnieszka Radwańska, and Urszula Radwańska were among the guests. Guests at the ceremony included Williams' husband Alexis Ohanian, basketball players Pau Gasol and Harrison Barnes, and football player Jesse Palmer.

On 10 February 2021, Wozniacki announced on her Instagram account that she was expecting her first child. On 11 June 2021, Wozniacki gave birth to a daughter.

On 19 June 2022, Wozniacki announced on her Instagram account that she was expecting her second child. On 24 October 2022, their son was born.

On 6 April 2025, Wozniacki announced on her Instagram account that she was expecting her third child. A boy was born on 26 July 2025.

=== Health ===
In October 2018, Wozniacki announced that she was diagnosed with rheumatoid arthritis and that she would like to become a role model for people who have the condition. She was diagnosed with the auto-immune disease before the 2018 US Open, but was able to play through it. Wozniacki did suffer a drop in results after her diagnosis, until bouncing back by winning the 2018 China Open in Beijing without dropping a single set.

== Rivalries ==
=== Wozniacki vs. S. Williams ===
Wozniacki and Serena Williams have met 11 times with Williams leading the head-to-head 10–1. Williams leads 2–0 in majors, 8–1 on hardcourts, and 1–0 on both clay and grass. Both held the No. 1 ranking at different times between November 2009 and January 2012.

They first met at the 2009 Sydney International with Williams winning in three tight sets saving match points. Wozniacki's only win over Williams came at the 2012 Miami Open where she won in straight sets. In 2014 the rivalry reached its peak with the pair meeting four times and Williams winning all of them. Three of their four meetings went to three sets with Williams coming from a set down in each to win. At the Rogers Cup Wozniacki led by a set and a break before Williams came back to win it. They met a week later at the Cincinnati Open where Williams again came from a set down to win. They faced off against each other in the final at the US Open where Williams won in straight sets to claim her 18th Grand Slam title. Their most recent meeting at the WTA Finals was an epic with Wozniacki winning the first set before Williams came back to win the second set. At 4–4 Wozniacki broke Williams to serve for the match and Williams broke back. At 6–5 Wozniacki saved match point with an incredible volley and held serve to take the set to a tiebreak. In the tiebreak, Wozniacki was up 4–1 before Williams came back and eventually prevailed.

Despite being rivals, the two maintain a strong friendship off court. Wozniacki visited Williams during her recovery from injury in 2011. In 2014, it was announced that McIlroy had ended his engagement with Wozniacki just days prior to the French Open. Wozniacki received a call from her best friend Williams then in time of need. After they both lost early at the French Open, they went on vacation in Miami. They attended a Mariah Carey concert the night before their semifinal match at the WTA Finals. Williams was present during Wozniacki's run at the 2014 New York City Marathon. They also went on a mini tour around New York City. Wozniacki attended Williams' wedding in 2017. Williams served as a bridesmaid at Wozniacki's wedding in 2019. In 2018, Williams posted an Instagram story during US Open with the caption "Auntie Caro" as her daughter Olympia watches her match against Stosur.

=== Wozniacki vs. Radwańska ===
Wozniacki and Agnieszka Radwańska have met 17 times with Wozniacki leading the head-to-head 11–6. Wozniacki leads 9–6 on hardcourts and 2–0 on clay.

They first met at the 2007 Nordic Light Open with Radwańska taking the victory in straight sets. After that win, Wozniacki won the next five matches before the streak snapped at the 2012 Sydney International where she lost in three sets. Radwańska then won the next two matches before that streak was snapped at the 2014 Western & Southern Open where she lost in straight sets. After this event, Wozniacki took another four consecutive wins, then she lost at the 2016 Wuhan Open in straight sets. A week later, she lost again at the 2016 China Open in straight sets. Their next two meetings were at the 2017 Qatar Ladies Open and the 2017 Rogers Cup. Wozniacki won both matches in straight sets.

=== Wozniacki vs. Kerber ===
Wozniacki and Kerber have met 16 times with both having won 8 of them.

=== Wozniacki vs. Kvitová ===
Wozniacki and Kvitová have met 15 times with Kvitová leading the head-to-head 8-7.

=== Wozniacki vs. Sharapova ===
Wozniacki and Maria Sharapova have met 11 times with Sharapova leading the head-to-head 7–4. Wozniacki leads 2–1 in Grand Slams with two wins at the US Open and one loss at the Australian Open. They are tied at 4–4 on hard courts, while Sharapova leads 3–0 on clay.

The pair first met at the 2008 Qatar Ladies Open where Sharapova won in straight sets and then again at the 2008 Rome Masters. Wozniacki then won the next two meetings to tie the head-to-head. Sharapova then won the next three meetings including their only meeting in a final at the 2013 Indian Wells Open. Wozniacki snapped the losing streak by beating Sharapova in three sets at the 2014 US Open and would go on to the reach the final. They met again at the 2014 WTA Finals where Wozniacki won in three sets in a marathon match that lasted over three hours. Their most recent meeting was at the 2019 Australian Open where Sharapova won in three sets.

=== Wozniacki vs. Halep ===
Wozniacki and Simona Halep have met seven times with Wozniacki leading the head-to-head 5–2. Wozniacki leads 3–2 on hardcourts, 1–0 on both clay and grass courts and 1–0 in the majors.

They first met at the 2012 Dubai Tennis Championships with Wozniacki winning in straight sets. Then, Halep won the next two matches, one at the 2013 New Haven Open at Yale in straight sets and another one at the 2015 Dubai Tennis Championships in three sets. Wozniacki then took a four-match winning streak over Halep, beginning at the 2015 Stuttgart Open and including their most recent meeting at the 2018 Australian Open in the final, where she defeated Halep in three sets to win her first Grand Slam title and snatch the world No. 1 position from Halep.

=== Wozniacki vs. Plíšková ===
The pair have met ten times in their career, with Wozniacki holding a 6–4 advantage over Plíšková, Wozniacki leads 6–3 on hardcourts, Plíšková leading 1–0 on grass. They never met at major level.

The rivalry between Wozniacki and Karolína Plíšková didn't seem to brew very fast at the beginning of their meetings. The first three meetings occurred in 2013 and 2014 and all three meetings went the way of Wozniacki, all of which happening in three sets. Their rivalry really picked up in 2017 where the pair met six times, in this year their head-to-head record was 3–3 and each meeting would alternate the winner. The first meeting came in the final stage of 2017 Qatar Ladies Open, Plíšková winning in straight sets. A month later in the semifinals of 2017 Miami Open, Wozniacki took victory in three sets. Later, on the grass Pliskova took the 2017 Eastbourne International title beating Wozniacki in straight sets. Their fourth meeting was arguably the match of the year, in the 2017 Rogers Cup quarterfinals, where Wozniacki stormed back from 1–5 down in the first set and break down in the third set to take the victory. One week later, the pair met in the 2017 Western & Southern Open quarterfinals where Plíšková dispatched a tired Wozniacki from making the final of Toronto the previous week. At the semifinal stage of the 2017 WTA Finals, Wozniacki won a marathon first set propelling her to a straight sets victory over Plíšková, and eventually lifting the title. The last meeting in 2018 occurred at the round robin of the 2018 WTA Finals where Wozniacki was upset in straight sets.

== Career statistics ==
=== Significant finals ===
==== Grand Slam tournaments ====
Result	Year	Championship	Surface	Opponent	Score
Loss	2009	US Open	Hard	(Belgium) Kim Clijsters	5–7, 3–6
Loss	2014	US Open	Hard	(United States) Serena Williams	3–6, 3–6
Win	2018	Australian Open	Hard	(Romania) Simona Halep	7–6^{(7–2)}, 3–6, 6–4

==== WTA Championships ====
Result	Year	Location	Surface	Opponent	Score
Loss	2010	Doha, Qatar	Hard	(Belgium) Kim Clijsters	3–6, 7–5, 3–6
Win	2017	Singapore	Hard (i)	(United States) Venus Williams	6–4, 6–4

=== Grand Slam performance timelines ===
Key
W	F	SF	QF	#R	RR	Q#	DNQ	A	NH

(W) winner; (F) finalist; (SF) semifinalist; (QF) quarterfinalist; (#R) rounds 4, 3, 2, 1; (RR) round-robin stage; (Q#) qualification round; (DNQ) did not qualify; (A) absent; (NH) not held; (SR) strike rate (events won / competed); (W–L) win–loss record.

==== Singles ====
Tournament	2006	2007	2008	2009	2010	2011	2012	2013	2014	2015	2016	2017	2018	2019	2020	...	2023	2024	SR	W–L	Win%
Australian Open	A	A	4R	3R	4R	SF	QF	4R	3R	2R	1R	3R	W	3R	3R	...	A	2R	1 / 14	37–13	74%
French Open	A	1R	3R	3R	QF	3R	3R	2R	1R	2R	A	QF	4R	1R	A	...	A	A	0 / 12	21–12	64%
Wimbledon	Q1	2R	3R	4R	4R	4R	1R	2R	4R	4R	1R	4R	2R	3R	NH	...	A	3R	0 / 14	27–14	66%
US Open	A	2R	4R	F	SF	SF	1R	3R	F	2R	SF	2R	2R	3R	A	...	4R	4R	0 / 15	44–15	75%
Win–loss	0–0	2–3	10–4	13–4	15–4	15–4	6–4	7–4	11–4	6–4	5–3	10–4	12–3	6–4	2–1	...	3–1	6–3	1 / 55	129–54	70%

==== Doubles ====
Tournament	2007	2008	2009	2010	SR	W–L	Win%
Australian Open	A	2R	1R	1R	0 / 3	1–3	25%
French Open	A	1R	1R	2R	0 / 3	1–3	25%
Wimbledon	A	1R	2R	2R	0 / 3	2–3	40%
US Open	1R	2R	3R	2R	0 / 4	4–4	50%
Win–loss	0–1	2–4	3–4	3–4	0 / 13	8–13	38%

== Achievements ==
Time span	Selected records	Players matched	Ref
29 January 2012 – 29 January 2018	The longest span between stints as the world No. 1 female player (6 years, 0 days)	Stands alone	
2008–2011	4 Connecticut Open titles	Steffi Graf; Venus Williams	

Sporting positions
Preceded by Serena Williams; Kim Clijsters; Simona Halep	World No. 1; 11 October 2010 – 13 February 2011; 21 February 2011 – 30 January 2012; 29 January 2018 – 26 February 2018	Succeeded by Kim Clijsters; Victoria Azarenka; Simona Halep
Preceded by Elena Dementieva	US Open Series Champion; 2010	Succeeded by Serena Williams
Preceded by Jessica Kirkland	Orange Bowl Girls' Singles Champion; Category: 18 and under 2005	Succeeded by Nikola Hofmanova
Awards
Preceded by Ágnes Szávay	WTA Newcomer of the Year; 2008	Succeeded by Melanie Oudin
Preceded by Serena Williams	ITF Women's Singles World Champion; 2010	Succeeded by Petra Kvitová
Preceded by Lotte Friis; Viktor Axelsen	Danish Sports Name of the Year; 2010; 2018	Succeeded by Jeanette Ottesen; Mads Pedersen
Preceded by Samantha Stosur; Petra Kvitová	Diamond Aces; 2011; 2015	Succeeded by Victoria Azarenka; Simona Halep
Olympic Games
Preceded by Kim Wraae Knudsen	Flagbearer for Denmark; Rio de Janeiro 2016	Succeeded by Sara Petersen & Jonas Warrer
