= Nordic Light Open =

Nordea Nordic Light Open

Defunct tennis tournament
- Founded: 2002
- Abolished: 2008
- Editions: 7
- Location: Stockholm; Sweden
- Category: Tier IV
- Surface: Hard / outdoors
- Draw: 32M/32Q/16D
- Prize money: $145,000

The Nordic Light Open (sponsored by Nordea) was a women's tennis tournament held in Stockholm, Sweden (in 2002 and 2003 the tournament was played in Espoo, Finland on clay courts). Held from 2002 to 2008, this WTA Tour event was a Tier IV-tournament and was played on outdoor hardcourts.

As from 2009, the Nordic Light Open was replaced by the women's Swedish Open, at Båstad.

== Past finals ==
=== Singles ===
Location	Year	Champions	Runners-up	Score
Espoo	2002	(Russia) Svetlana Kuznetsova	(Czech Republic) Denisa Chládková	0–6, 6–3, 7–6^{(7–2)}
Espoo	2003	(Israel) Anna Pistolesi	(Croatia) Jelena Kostanić	4–6, 6–4, 6–0
Stockholm	2004	(Australia) Alicia Molik	(Ukraine) Tatiana Perebiynis	6–1, 6–1
Stockholm	2005	(Slovenia) Katarina Srebotnik	(Russia) Anastasia Myskina	7–5, 6–2
Stockholm	2006	(China) Zheng Jie	(Russia) Anastasia Myskina	6–4, 6–1
Stockholm	2007	(Poland) Agnieszka Radwańska	(Russia) Vera Dushevina	6–1, 6–1
Stockholm	2008	(Denmark) Caroline Wozniacki	(Russia) Vera Dushevina	6–0, 6–2
Stockholm	2009	Not held (see Swedish Open)		

=== Doubles ===
Location	Year	Champions	Runners-up	Score
Espoo	2002	(Spain) Arantxa Sánchez (Russia) Svetlana Kuznetsova	(Spain) Eva Bes (Spain) María Martínez	6–3, 6–7^{(5–7)}, 6–3
Espoo	2003	(Ukraine) Olena Tatarkova (Russia) Evgenia Kulikovskaya	(Ukraine) Tatiana Perebiynis (Croatia) Silvija Talaja	6–2, 6–4
Stockholm	2004	(Australia) Alicia Molik (Austria) Barbara Schett	(Germany) Anna-Lena Grönefeld (Switzerland) Emmanuelle Gagliardi	6–3, 6–3
Stockholm	2005	(France) Émilie Loit (Slovenia) Katarina Srebotnik	(Czech Republic) Eva Birnerová (Italy) Mara Santangelo	6–4, 6–3
Stockholm	2006	(Czech Republic) Eva Birnerová (Slovakia) Jarmila Gajdošová	(China) Yan Zi (China) Zheng Jie	0–6, 6–4, 6–2
Stockholm	2007	(Spain) Anabel Medina (Spain) Virginia Ruano	(Chinese Taipei) Chan Chin-wei (Ukraine) Tetiana Luzhanska	6–1, 5–7, [10–6]
Stockholm	2008	(Czech Republic) Iveta Benešová (Czech Republic) Barbora Záhlavová-Strýcová	(Czech Republic) Petra Cetkovská (Czech Republic) Lucie Šafářová	7-5, 6-4
Stockholm	2009	Not held (see Swedish Open)		

== See also ==
- List of tennis tournaments
- List of sporting events in Sweden
