= Azure (color) =

Bright, cyan-blue color

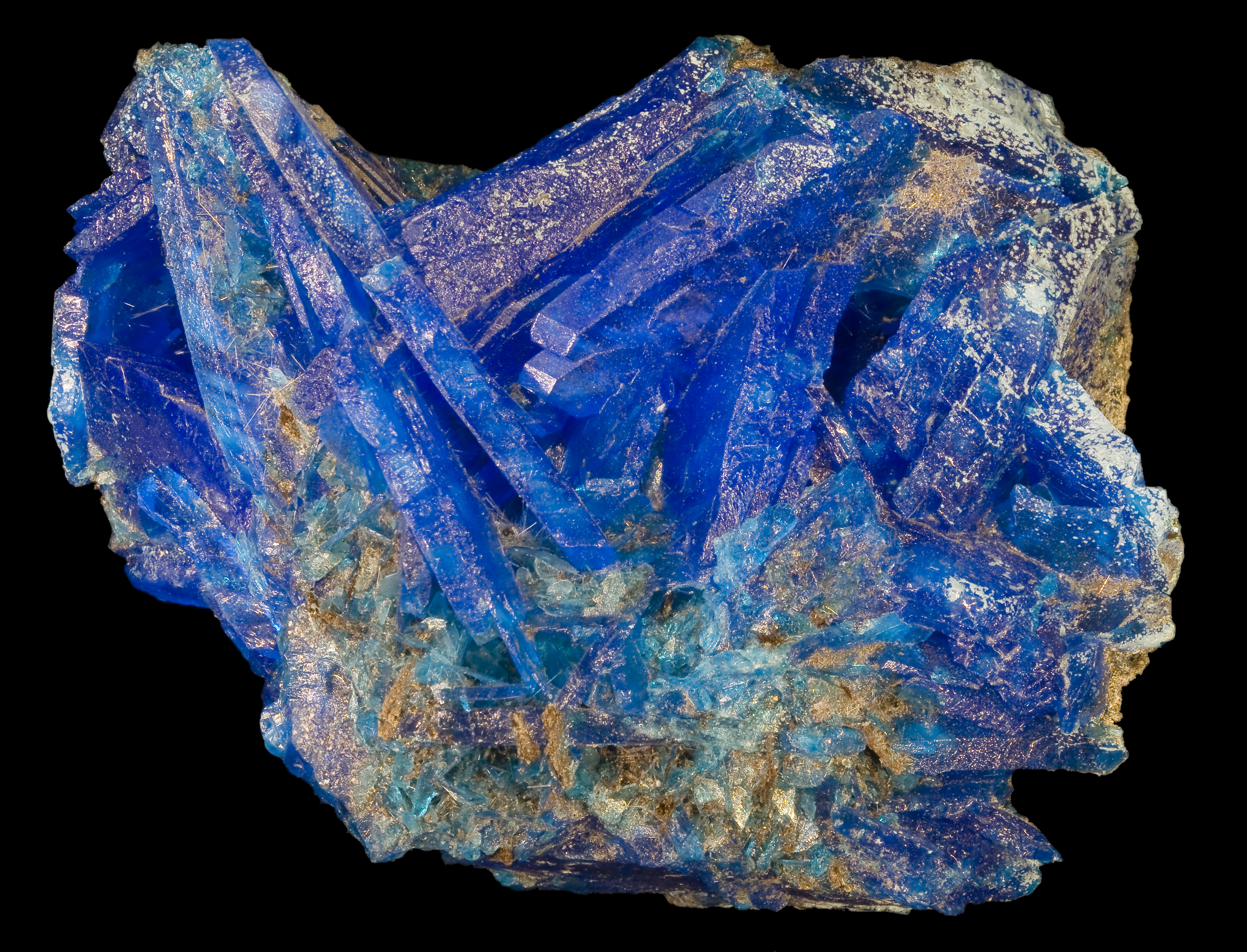
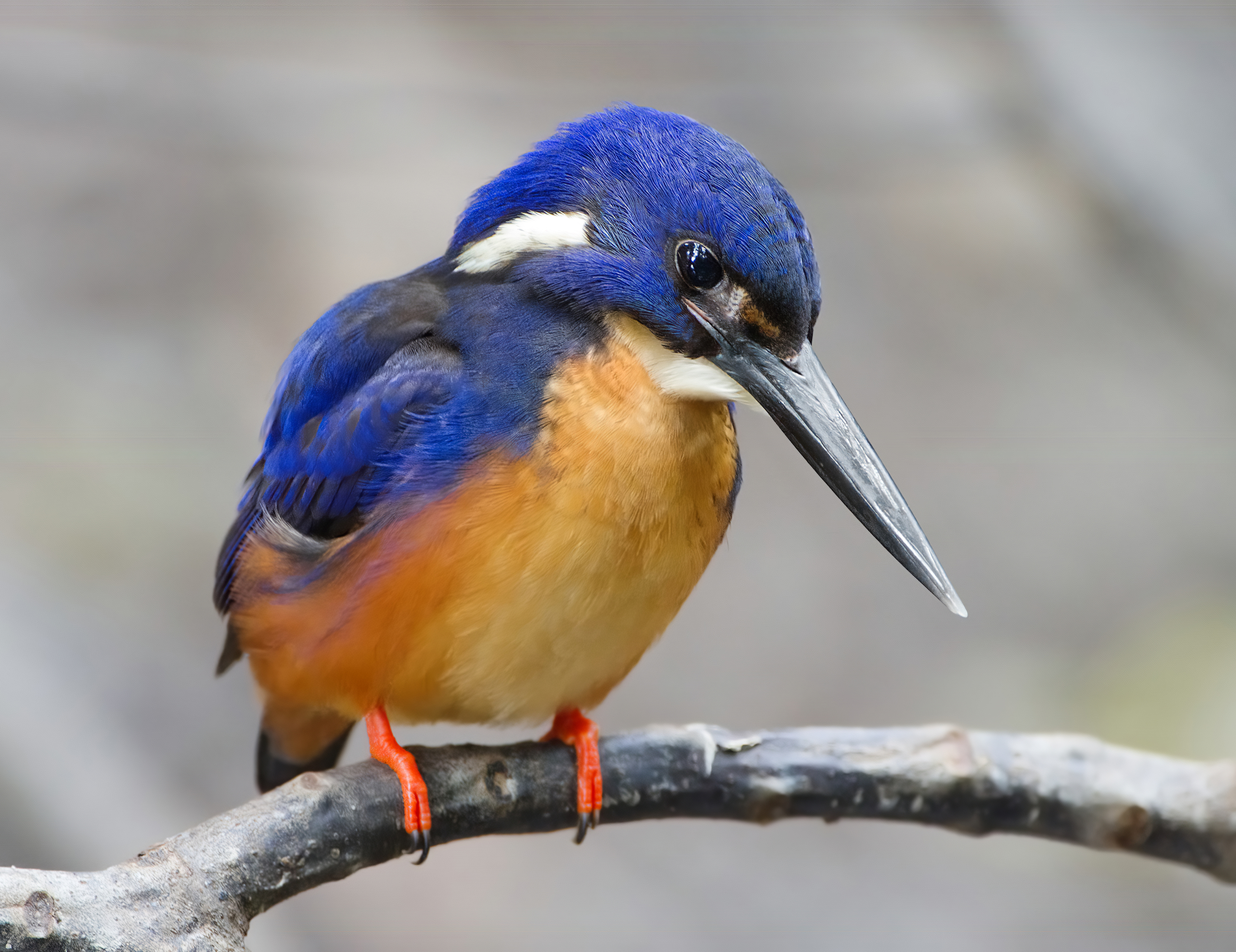
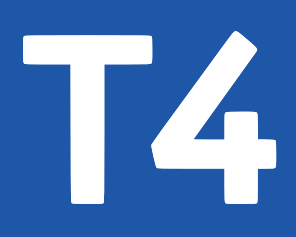
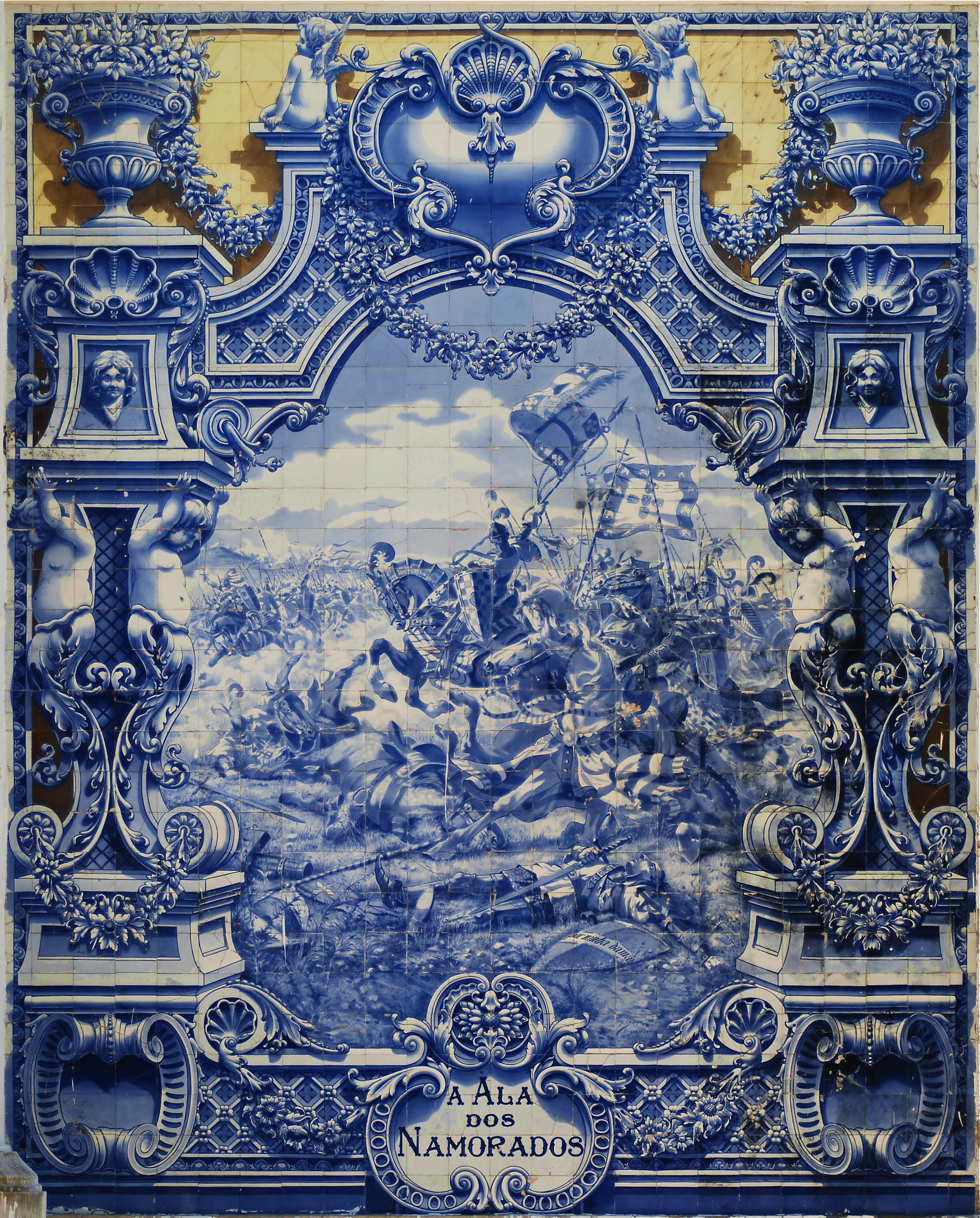
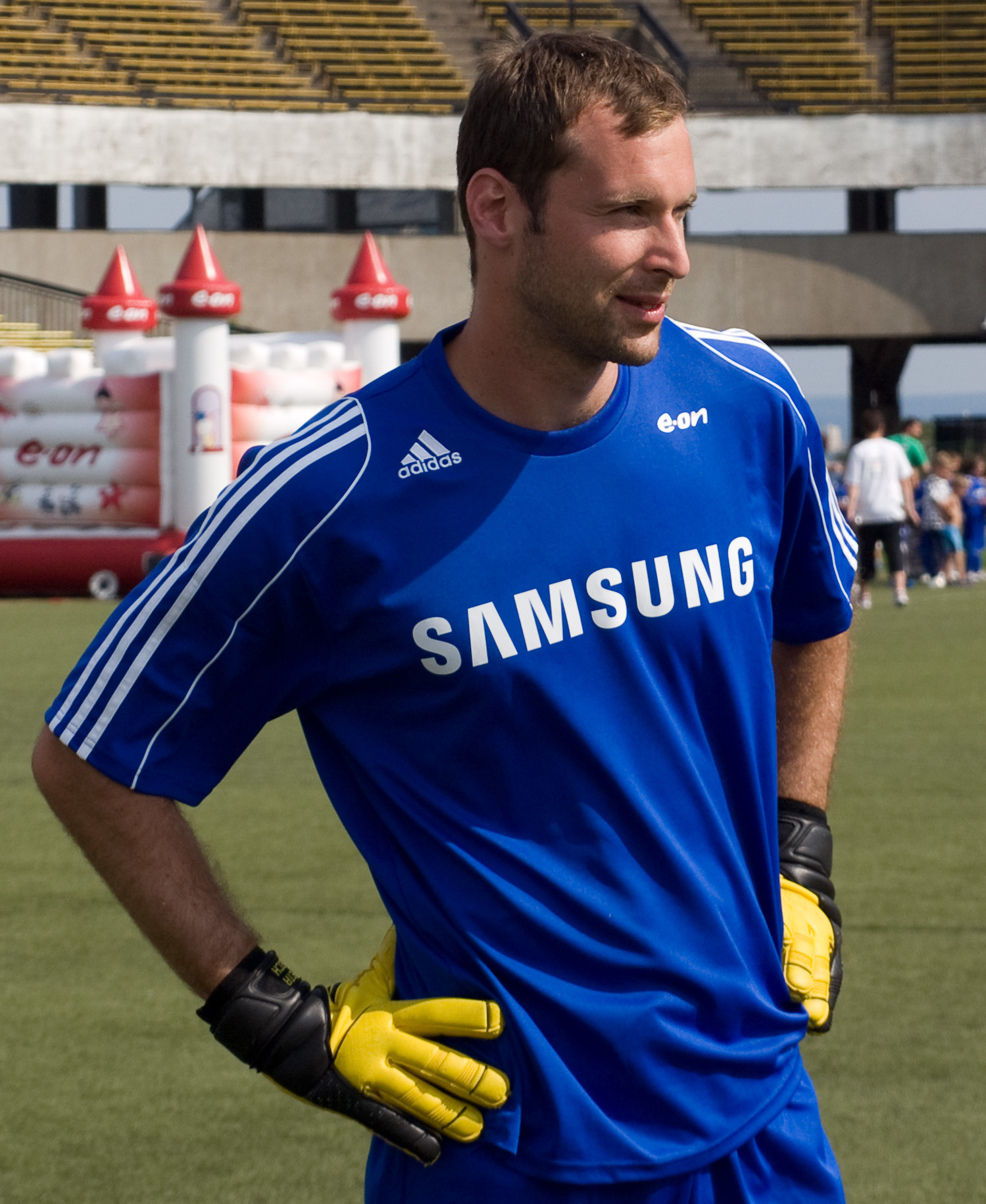
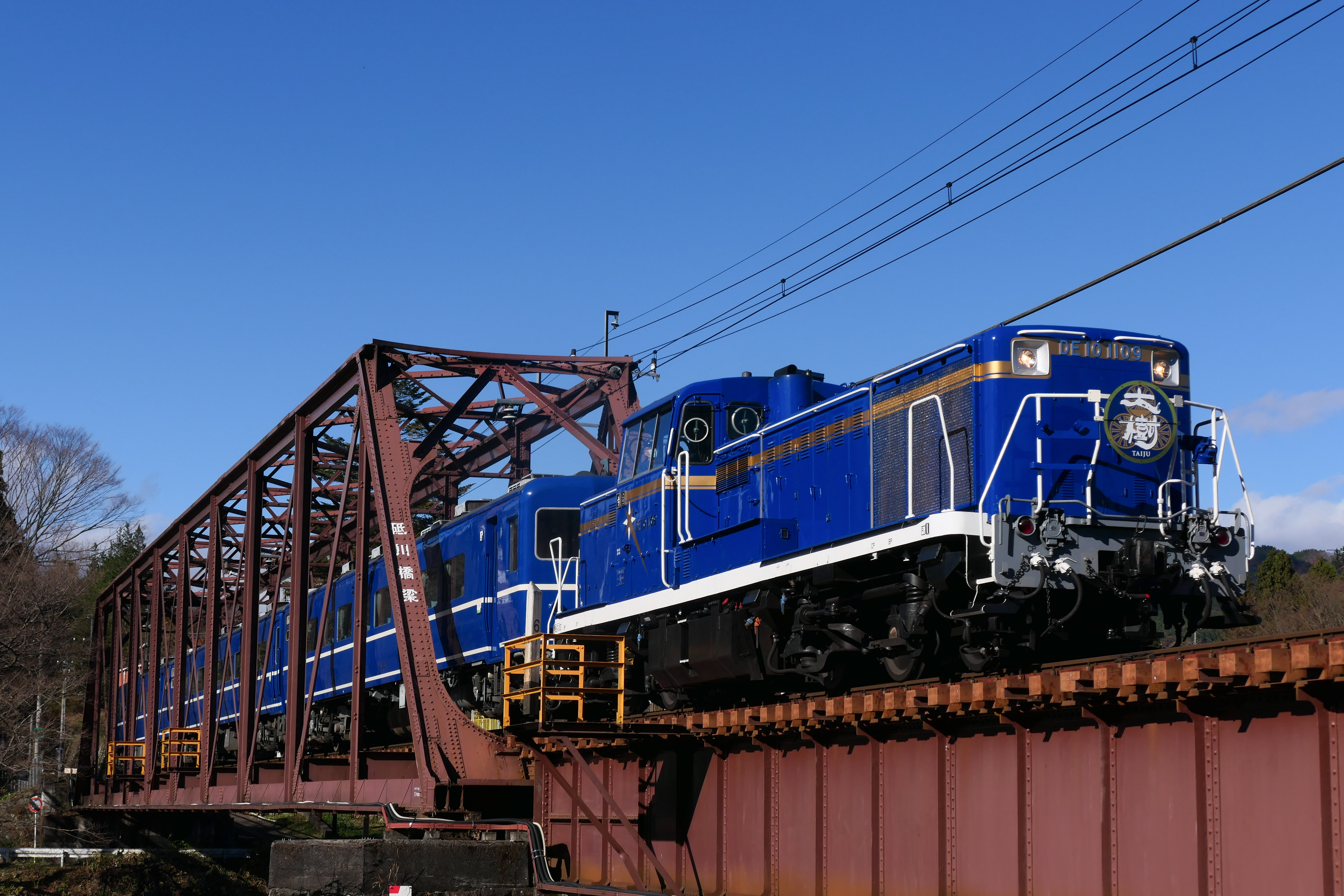
- Clockwise, from top left: Chalcanthite; Azure kingfisher; Logo for the T4 Eastern Suburbs & Illawarra Line; Petr Čech in an azure jersey; DE10-1109 diesel locomotive; Panel of the Battle of Aljubarrota by Jorge Colaço.

Color coordinates
- Hex triplet: #0080FF
- sRGB^{B} (r, g, b): (0, 128, 255)
- HSV (h, s, v): (210°, 100%, 100%)
- CIELCh_{uv} (L, C, h): (55, 117, 255°)
- Source: On the RGB and CMYK color wheel, Azure is defined as the color halfway between blue and cyan in the color wheel. The color halfway between blue and cyan on the RGB color wheel has a hex code of 0080FF.
- ISCC–NBS descriptor: Vivid blue
- B: Normalized to [0–255] (byte); H: Normalized to [0–100] (hundred)

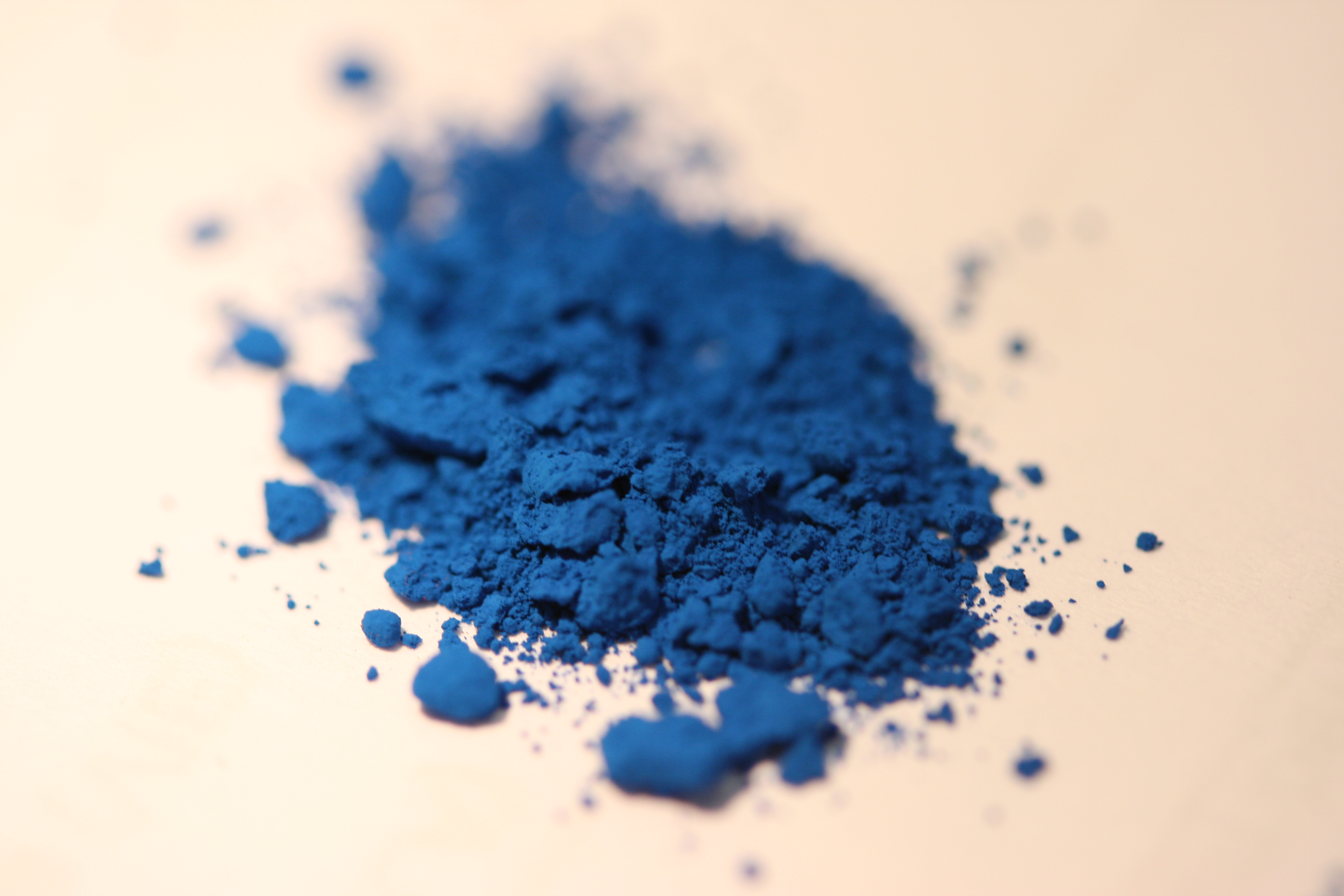
Azure pigment

Azure (Note: /ˈæʒər, ˈeɪʒər/ AZH-ər, AY-zhər, UK also /ˈæzjʊər, ˈeɪzjʊər/ AZ-ure, AY-zure)) is the color between cyan and blue on the color wheel. It is often described as the color of the sky on a clear day.

On the RGB color wheel, "azure" (hexadecimal #0080FF) is defined as the color at 210 degrees, i.e., the hue halfway between blue and cyan. In the RGB color model, used to create all the colors on a television or computer screen, azure is created by adding a 20% of green light to a 100% of blue light.

In the X11 color system, which became a model for early web colors, azure is depicted as a pale cyan or white cyan.

== Etymology and history ==
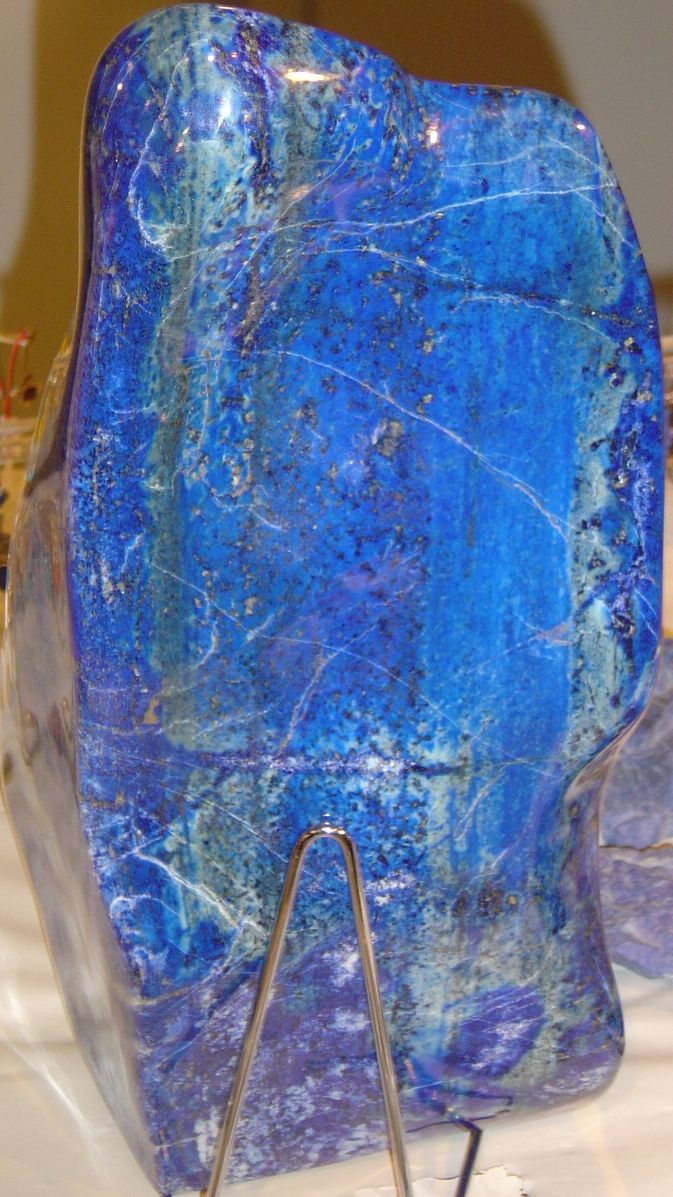
A polished slab of lapis lazuli, the semiprecious rock from which azure took its name

The color azure ultimately takes its name from the vivid-blue gemstone lapis lazuli, a metamorphic rock. Lapis is the Latin word for "stone" and lāzulī is the genitive form of the Medieval Latin lāzulum, which is taken from the Arabic لازورد lāzaward [laːzwrd], itself from the Persian لاژورد lāžaward, which is the name of the stone in Persian and also of a place where lapis lazuli was mined.

The name of the stone came to be associated with its color. The French azur, the Italian azzurro, the Polish lazur, Romanian azur and azuriu, the Portuguese and Spanish azul, Hungarian azúr, and the Catalan atzur, all come from the name and color of lapis lazuli. The dropping of the initial l in Romance languages may be a case of the linguistic phenomenon known as rebracketing, i.e. Romance speakers may have perceived the sound as the initial phoneme of the definitive article in their respective language.

The word was adopted into English from the French, and the first recorded use of it as a color name in English was in 1374 in Geoffrey Chaucer's work Troilus and Criseyde, where he refers to "a broche, gold and asure" (a brooch, gold and azure).

Some languages, such as Italian, generally consider azure to be a basic color, separate and distinct from blue. Some sources even go to the point of defining blue as a darker shade of azure.

Azure also describes the color of the mineral azurite, both in its natural form and as a pigment in various paint formulations. In order to preserve its deep color, azurite was ground coarsely. Fine-ground azurite produces a lighter, washed-out color. Traditionally, the pigment was considered unstable in oil paints, and was sometimes isolated from other colors and not mixed.

The use of the term spread through the practice of heraldry, where "azure" represents a blue color in the system of tinctures. In engravings, it is represented as a region of parallel horizontal lines, or by the abbreviation az. or b. In practice, azure has been represented by any number of shades of blue. In later heraldic practice a lighter blue, called bleu celeste ("sky blue"), is sometimes specified.

== Distinction among indigo, azure, and cyan ==
According to the logic of the RGB color wheel, indigo colors are those colors with hue codes between 255 and 225 (degrees), azure colors are those colors with hue codes between 195 and 225, and cyan colors are those colors with hue codes between 165 and 195. Another way of describing it could be that cyan is a mixture of blue and green light, azure is a mixture of blue and cyan light, and indigo is a mixture of blue and violet light.

All of the colors shown in the section shades of azure are referenced as having a hue between 195 and 225 degrees, with the exception of the very pale X11 web color azure – RGB (240, 255, 255) – which, with a hue of 180 degrees, is a tone of cyan, but follows the artistic meaning of azure as sky blue.

== In nature ==
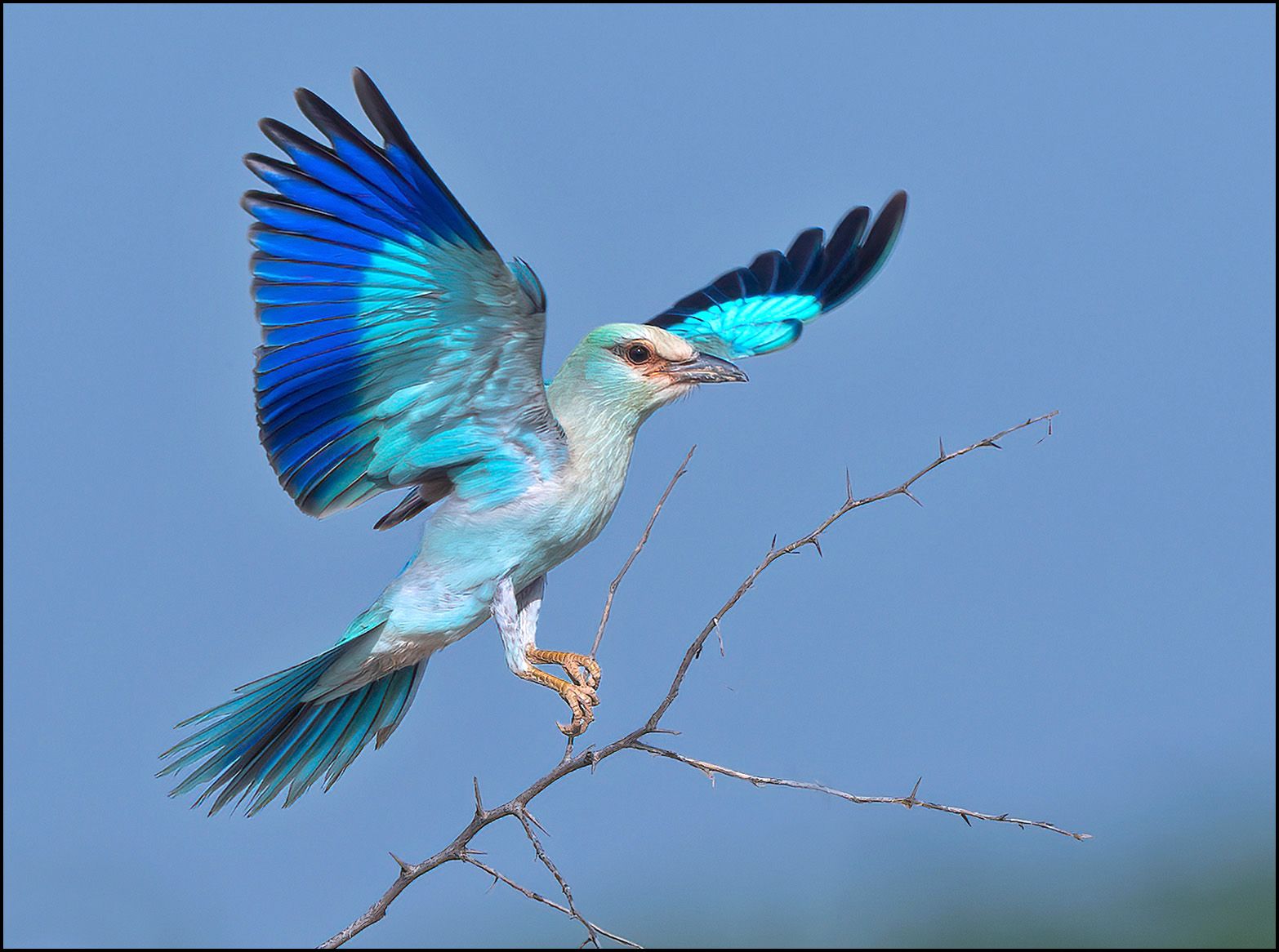
European roller

Insects

- Azure bluet (Enallagma aspersum), damselfly found in North America
- Azure damselfly (Coenagrion puella), damselfly found in Europe
- Azure hawker (Aeshna caerulea), dragonfly in the family Aeshnidae

Birds

- Azure gallinule (Porphyrio flavirostris), bird in the rail family, Rallidae
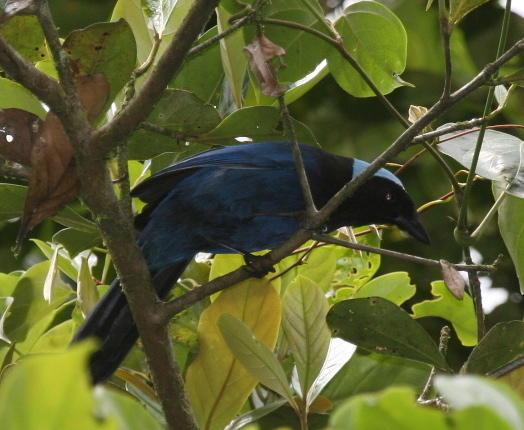
- Azure-hooded jay in a tree
  Azure jay (Cyanocorax caeruleus) bird in the crow family, Corvidae
- Azure kingfisher (Alcedo azurea), bird in the river kingfisher family, Alcedinidae
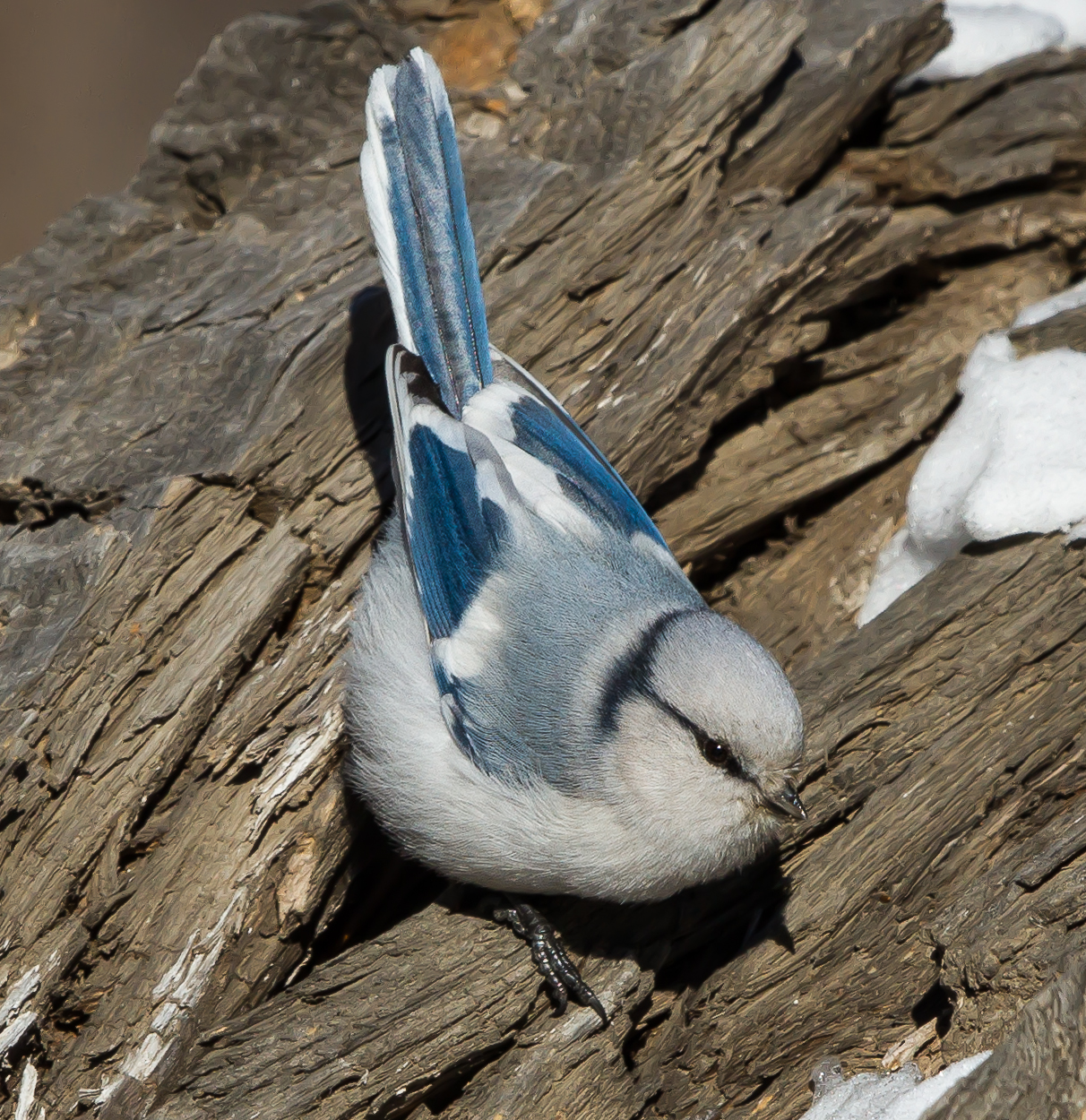
- Azure tit
  Azure tit (Cyanistes cyanus), bird in the tit family, Paridae
- Azure-crowned hummingbird (Amazilia cyanocephala), a hummingbird in the family Trochilidae
- Azure-hooded jay (Cyanolyca cucullata), bird in the crow family, Corvidae
- Azure-naped jay (Cyanocorax heilprini), bird in the crow family, Corvidae
- Azure-rumped tanager (Tangara cabanisi), bird in the family Thraupidae
- Azure-shouldered tanager (Thraupis cyanoptera), bird in the family Thraupidae
- Azure-winged magpie (Cyanopica cyana), bird in the crow family, Corvidae
- European roller (Coracias garrulus)

Plants

- Azure bluet (Houstonia caerulea), flower found in the eastern United States

== In culture ==
- Côte d'Azur ("Azure Coast") is a name commonly used for the French Riviera, part of France's southeastern coast on the Mediterranean Sea.
- In Chinese mythology, the Azure Dragon is one of the Four Symbols of the Chinese constellations. It is sometimes called the Azure Dragon of the East (traditional Chinese: 東方青龍; simplified Chinese: 东方青龙; pinyin: Dōngfāng Qīnglóng). Known as Seiryū (青竜) in Japan and Cheongryong (청룡／青龍) in Korea, it represents the east and the spring season.
- Savoy azure (azzurro Savoia) is one of the traditional national colors of Italy, taken from the traditional colors of the House of Savoy, the ruling house of the Kingdom of Piedmont-Sardinia that established the first modern united Italian State. The association between azure and Italian nationalism led in the Italy national football team donning azure jerseys, giving them the nickname gli Azzurri ("the Azures"). It is also the color of the Italian state police (Polizia di Stato).
- Portuguese and Spanish tilework known as azulejo has the same etymology due to the color blue (azul) being used in its design.

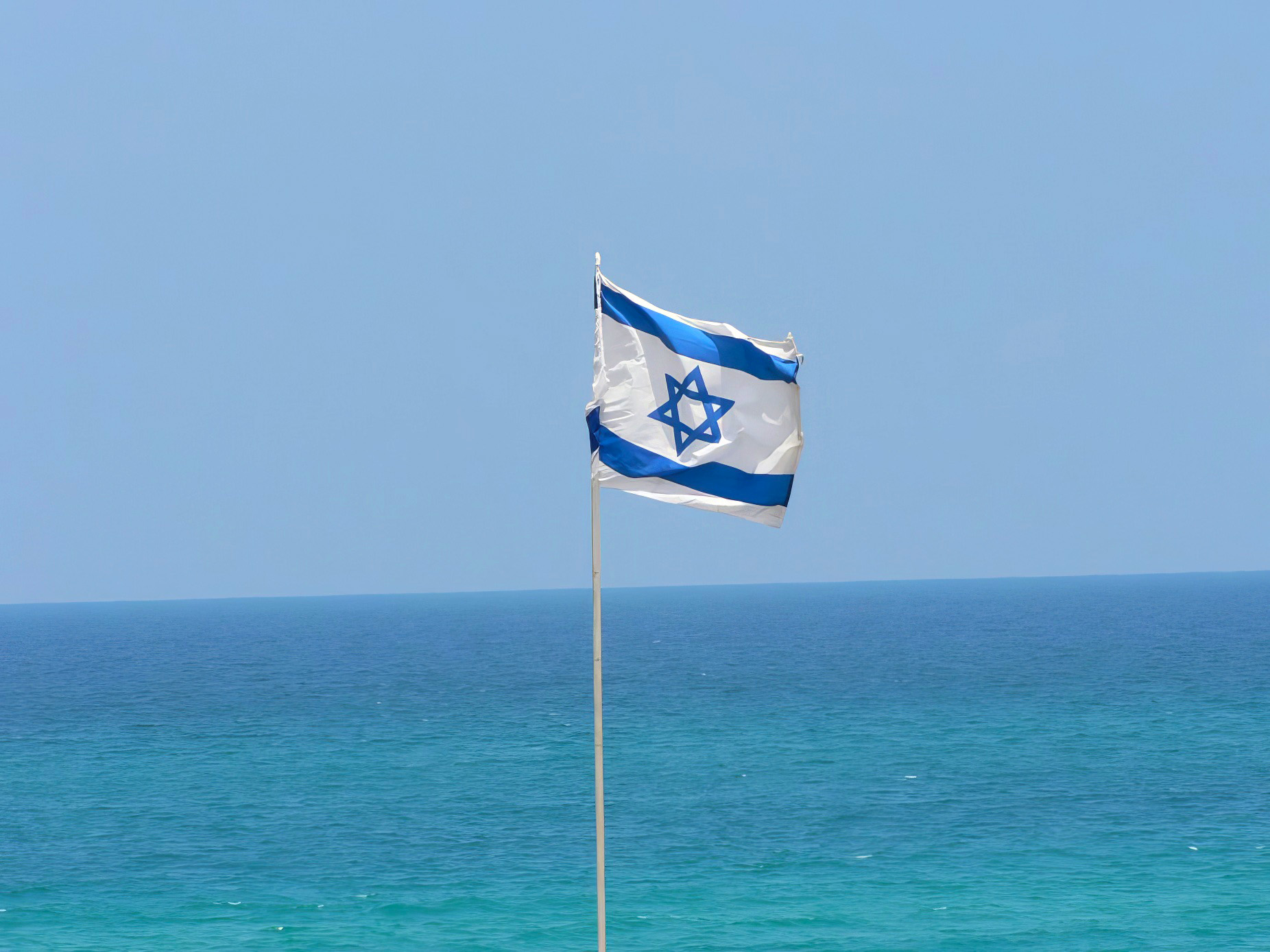
Shades of azure, tekhelet, and blue are seen in this photo, depicting the flag of Israel on the background of the sea at Rishon LeZion beach.

- In modern Hebrew, the azure color is called Tekhelet (תכלת). Tekhelet and white are sacred colors for the Jewish people. In the Torah, there is a mitzva to put a Tekhelet thread in the tzitzit. The colors Tekhelet and white are the national colors of Israel and appear in the flag of Israel (where the Tekhelet resembles blue).
- In the Bandai Namco video game series Soulcalibur, one of the main characters, Nightmare, is frequently referred to as the "Azure Knight" due to the azure color of his armor.

== Astronomy ==
The true color of the exoplanet HD 189733b determined by astronomers is azure blue.

== Commerce ==
Alazine Dyes have been produced since the 1860's when a Dye Patent (Filed 11 June 1860) by Frederick Crace Calvert of Manchester (with tar distiller Samuel Clift and their assistant, Charles Lowe) for the production, from coal-tar/ aniline derivatives, of blue (azurine) and green (emeraldine) dyes for calico.

== See also ==
- RAL 5009 Azure blue
- Shades of azure
- Lists of colors
