= National colours =

Colours that represent a nation

National colours are frequently part of a country's set of national symbols. Many states and nations have formally adopted a set of colours as their official "national colours" while others have de facto national colours that have become well known through popular use. National colours often appear on a variety of different media, from the nation's flag to the colours used in sports. Before World War I, they also served as the colours of different military uniforms for each nation or region.

== Africa ==
Country	Flag	Primary colours	Secondary colours	Primary	Secondary	Further information
Algeria		Green, white and red				
Angola		Red, black and yellow				
Benin		Green, yellow and red				
Botswana		Light blue, black and white				
Burkina Faso		Red, green and yellow				
Burundi		Red, white and green				
Cameroon		Green, red and yellow				
Cape Verde		Blue, white, red and yellow				
Central African Republic		Blue, white, green, yellow and red				
Chad		Blue, yellow and red				
Comoros		Yellow, white, red, blue and green				
Congo, Democratic Republic of the	Democratic Republic of the Congo	Blue, yellow and red				
Congo, Republic of the	Republic of the Congo	Green, yellow and red				
Djibouti		Light blue, green, white and red				
Egypt		Red, white and black	Gold			
Equatorial Guinea		Green, white, red and blue				
Eritrea		Green, blue, red and yellow				
Eswatini (Swaziland)		Blue, yellow, red, black and white				
Ethiopia		Green, yellow, red and blue				
Gabon		Green, yellow and blue				
Gambia		Red, blue, green and white				
Ghana		Red, yellow, green and black	Black and white (used in sports)			
Guinea		Red, yellow and green				
Guinea-Bissau		Red, yellow, green and black				
Ivory Coast	Côte d'Ivoire	Orange, white and green				
Kenya		Black, red, green and white				
Lesotho		Blue, white, green and black				
Liberia		Red, white and blue				
Libya		Red, black, green and white				
Madagascar		Red, green and white				
Malawi		Black, red and green				
Mali		Green, yellow and red				
Mauritania		Green, yellow and red				
Mauritius		Red, blue, yellow and green				
Morocco		Red and green				
Mozambique		Green, yellow, red, black and white				
Namibia		Blue, red, green, white and yellow				
Niger		Orange, white and green				
Nigeria		Green and white				
Rwanda		Sky blue, yellow and green				
São Tomé and Príncipe		Green, yellow, red and black				
Senegal		Green, yellow and red				
Seychelles		Blue, yellow, red, white and green				
Sierra Leone		Green, white and blue				
Somalia		Blue and white				
South Africa		Red, green, blue, gold, black and white	Green and gold (used in sports)			
South Sudan		Black, red, green, blue, yellow and white				
Sudan		Red, white, black and green				
Tanzania		Green, yellow, blue and black				
Togo		Green, yellow, red and white				
Tunisia		Red and white				
Uganda		Black, yellow and red				
Zambia		Green, red, black and orange				
Zimbabwe		Green, yellow, red, black and white				

== North America ==
Country	Flag	Primary colours	Secondary colours	Primary	Secondary	Further information
Antigua and Barbuda		Red, white, blue, black and yellow				
Bahamas		Aquamarine, yellow and black				
Barbados		Ultramarine, gold and black				
Belize		Blue, red and white	Sky blue (used in sports)			
Canada		Red and white	Black (only used in sports)			National colours of Canada
Costa Rica		Blue, white and red	Black (used in sports)			
Cuba		Blue, white and red	Black			
Dominica		Green, yellow, black, white and red	Blue (used in sports)			
Dominican Republic		Blue, white and red				
El Salvador		Blue and white				
Grenada		Green, yellow and red				
Guatemala		Blue and white	Navy blue and green-blue			
Haiti		Blue and red				
Honduras		Blue and white	Turquoise and midnight blue			
Jamaica		Green, gold and black				
Mexico		Green, white and red	Black, Indian red, magenta and lime green (used only in sports)			
Nicaragua		Blue and white	Gold and denim (used only in sports)			
Panama		Blue, white and red	Midnight blue and cadet blue (used only in sports)			
Saint Kitts and Nevis		Green, red and white	Gold and black			
Saint Lucia		Light blue, yellow, black and white	Blue (only in sports)			
Saint Vincent and the Grenadines		Blue, yellow and green				
Trinidad and Tobago		Red, white and black	Maroon (only in sports)			
United States		Red, white and blue				List of U.S. state colors

=== Sub-national colours ===
Country, nation or region	Flag	Primary colours	Secondary colours	Primary	Secondary	Further information
Anguilla		Orange, blue and white				
Aruba		Yellow, cerulean, white, red				
Bermuda		Red, blue and white	Prussian blue (used in sports)			
Bonaire		Yellow, blue and white				
British Virgin Islands		Green, yellow and white				
Cayman Islands		Blue, red and white				
Curaçao		Blue, yellow and white				
Guadeloupe	(Guadeloupe)	Green, red and white	Black			
Martinique		Red, green and black	Blue and white			
Montserrat		Black, green, dark blue, red and white				
New Brunswick		Pine green, navy blue and white				See Flag of New Brunswick
Puerto Rico		Red, white and blue				
Quebec		Royal Blue and white				See Flag of Quebec
Saint Martin	France	Yellow and blue	Dark blue, red and white			
Saint Pierre et Miquelon	(Saint Pierre and Miquelon)	Blue, white and red				
Sint Maarten	(Sint Maarten)	Red, blue and white				
Turks and Caicos	Turks and Caicos Islands	Blue, light blue, red and white	Green sheen (only in sports)			
US Virgin Islands	United States Virgin Islands	White, yellow and blue	Light blue (used only in sports)			

== South America ==
Country	Flag	Primary colours	Secondary colours	Primary	Secondary	Further information
Argentina		Light blue and white	Blue and black (used in sports)			
Bolivia		Red, yellow and green	White (used in sports)			
Brazil		Green and yellow	Blue and white			
Chile		Red, white and blue				
Colombia		Yellow, blue and red	Dark blue and white (used in sports)			
Ecuador		Yellow, blue and red	Sky blue (used in sports)			
French Guiana	France	Yellow and green	Blue (used in sports)			
Guyana		Yellow and green	Red and black			
Paraguay		Red, white and blue	Blue grey (used in sports)			
Peru		Red and white				
Suriname		White and green	Red and gold			
Uruguay		Blue and white	Light blue (used in sports)			Artigas flag, Flag of the Treinta y Tres
Venezuela		Yellow, blue and red	Burgundy, khaki, white and neon yellow (used in sports)			

== Asia ==
Country	Flag	Primary colours	Secondary colours	Primary	Secondary	Further information
Afghanistan		Black, red, green and white	Blue (sports)			
Bahrain		Red and white				
Bangladesh		Red and green	White (football)			First Flag of Bangladesh (1971)
Bhutan		Orange, gold and white				
Brunei		Yellow, black, white and red	Blue and green (football)			
Cambodia		Red and blue	Black (football)			
China	People's Republic of China	Red and yellow	Dark blue, black and white (sports)			
Georgia		Red and white				
India		Saffron orange, blue, white and green	Sky blue (sports)			
Indonesia		Red and white	Green (sports)			
Iran		Green, white and red	Black			
Iraq		Red, white, black and green				
Israel		Blue and white				National colours of Israel
Japan		Red and white	Black (sports); Blue, white and spring bud (only used in football)			
Jordan		Black, white, green and red				
Kazakhstan		Blue and gold	White and black (sports)			
Korea, North (Democratic People's Republic of Korea)	North Korea	Red, white and blue				
Korea, South (Republic of Korea)	South Korea	White, red, blue and black				
Kuwait		Green, white, red and black	Blue and red (sports)			
Kyrgyzstan		Red and yellow				
Laos		Red, blue and white	Black, gold and sky blue (football)			
Lebanon		Red, white and green				
Malaysia		Gold and black	Red, white, dark blue and gold			
Maldives		Red and white	Green and blue (football)			
Mongolia		Blue, red and yellow	White (sports)			
Myanmar		Yellow, green, red and white				
Nepal		Crimson, blue and white				
Oman		Red, white and green	Gold			
Pakistan		Green and white	Lime green and gold (sports)			
Philippines		Blue, red, white and yellow				
Qatar		Maroon and white				
Saudi Arabia		Green and white	Lavender			
Singapore		Red and white	Blue (football)			
Sri Lanka		Blue and yellow	Maroon, yellow, orange, green (flag colours) and white			
Syria		Red, white, black and green	Grey and gold			
Tajikistan		Red, white and green				
Thailand		Red, white and blue	Royal yellow, royal purple and blue sapphire			Royal flags of Thailand
Timor-Leste	East Timor	Red, yellow, black and white				
Turkmenistan		Green and white	Sand			
United Arab Emirates		Red, green, white and black	Gold and blue			
Uzbekistan		Blue, white, green and red	Black (sports)			
Vietnam		Yellow and red	Blue and White (sports)			
Yemen		Red, white and black				

=== Sub-national colours ===
Country, nation or region	Flag	Primary colours	Secondary colours	Primary	Secondary	Further information
Hong Kong		Red and white	Black and grey			
Macau		Green and white	White and dark blue (sports)			

== Europe ==
Country	Flag	Primary colours	Secondary colours	Primary	Secondary	Further information
Albania		Red and black				
Andorra		Blue, yellow and red				
Armenia		Red, blue and orange				
Austria		Red and white				
Azerbaijan		Sky blue, red and green				
Belarus		Red, green and white				
Belgium		Red	Black and yellow; Light blue (used in sports)			
Bosnia and Herzegovina		Blue and gold	White (used in football)			
Bulgaria		White, green and red				
Croatia		Red, white and blue				
Czech Republic		White, red and blue				National colours of the Czech Republic
Cyprus		Blue and white	Orange			
Denmark		Red and white				
Estonia		Blue, black and white				
Finland		White and blue	Red and gold			
France		Blue, white and red				
Georgia		Red and white				
Germany		Black, red and gold	White; Silver (used in motor racing); Green (used in football)			National colours of Germany
Greece		Blue and white				National colours of Greece
Hungary		Red, white and dark green				
Iceland		Blue, white and red				
Ireland		Green	St. Patrick's blue, white, orange			
Italy		Green, white and red	Azure			National colours of Italy
Latvia		Carmine and white				
Liechtenstein		Blue and red				
Lithuania		Yellow, green and red				
Luxembourg		Red, white and light blue				
Malta		Red and white				
Moldova		Blue, yellow and red				
Monaco		Red and white				
Montenegro		Red and gold				
Netherlands		Orange	Red, white and blue (flag)			Orange refers to the Dutch royal family, the House of Orange-Nassau.
North Macedonia		Red and yellow	White (used by the national football team)			
Norway		Red, blue and white				
Poland		White and red				
Portugal		Green and red	(Before the 1910 revolution: White and blue)			
Romania		Blue, yellow and red				
Russia		White, blue and red	Green			
San Marino		White and light blue				
Serbia		Red, blue and white				National colours of Serbia
Slovakia		White, blue and red				
Slovenia		White, blue and red	Green, blue and white (sports)			
Spain		Red and gold	(During the Second Spanish Republic: also purple)			
Sweden		Blue and yellow				See Flag of Sweden
Switzerland		Red and white				
Turkey		Red and white	Turquoise			
Ukraine		Blue and gold				National colours of Ukraine
United Kingdom		Red, white and blue	British racing green			National colours of the United Kingdom

=== Sub-national colours ===
Country, nation or region	Flag	Primary colours	Secondary colours	Primary	Secondary	Further information
Åland	(Åland)	Blue, yellow and red				
Andalucia	Andalucía	Green and white				
Basque Country	(Basque Country (autonomous community))	Green and red	White			
Bavaria	(Bavaria)	Sky blue and white				See Flag of Bavaria
Brittany	(Brittany)	Black and white				
Brussels Region	(Brussels)	Blue and yellow	Grey			
Canary Islands	(Canary Islands)	Yellow, blue and white				
Catalonia	(Catalonia)	Red and yellow				
Cornwall	(Cornwall)	Black and white				
Dublin City	(Dublin)	Green and blue				It is common to see dark blue and light blue flown for Dublin, but this is the GAA colours for Dublin county.
England	(England)	Red and white	Blue (sports)			
Faroe Islands	(Faroe Islands)	White, blue and red				
Flanders	(Flanders)	Black and yellow				
Friesland	(Friesland)	Blue, white and red				
Galicia	(Galicia (Spain))	Sky blue and white				
Gibraltar	(Gibraltar)	Red and white				
Guernsey	(Guernsey)	Red and white	Green (sports)			See Flag of Guernsey
Isle of Man		Red and grey	Yellow (sports)			Yellow is the colour of the unofficial national football team.
Jersey	(Jersey)	Red and white				
Moravia	(Moravia)	Red, white and blue				See Flag of Moravia
Northern Ireland		Red and white	Green and white (sports)			Green and white is in reference to the national football team
Saxony	(Saxony)	Green and white				
Scotland	(Scotland)	Blue and white				
Wales	(Wales)	Red, green and white	Yellow			Yellow is in reference to the colour of the national flower of Wales, the daffodil.
Wallonia	(Wallonia)	Red and yellow				

== Oceania ==
Country	Flag	Primary colours	Secondary colours	Primary	Secondary	Further information
Australia		Green and gold	Blue and white			National colours of Australia
Fiji		Light blue	White and black (rugby and other sports)			
Kiribati		Red, gold, blue and white				
New Zealand		Black	White, silver, ochre red, teal and beige (used by the cricket team in the 1980s)			National colours of New Zealand
Papua New Guinea		Red, black, yellow and white				
Samoa		Red, white and blue				
Solomon Islands		Olive green, yellow and blue	Green and white			
Tonga		Red and white				
Tuvalu		Sky blue, yellow and white	Blue			
Vanuatu		Red, green, black and yellow				

=== Sub-national colours ===
Country, nation or region	Flag	Primary colours	Secondary colours	Primary	Secondary	Further information
American Samoa		Blue, red and white				
Cook Islands		Green and white				
French Polynesia		Red and white				
Guam		Indigo and red	Blue and white			
New Caledonia		Grey, white and red				
Niue		Golden yellow and blue				
Australian Capital Territory		Dark blue, white and gold				see Sport in Australian Capital Territory
New South Wales		Sky blue	Navy blue and white			see Sport in New South Wales
Northern Territory		Black, White and Ochre				see Sport in Northern Territory
Queensland		Maroon	White and gold			see Symbols of Queensland
South Australia		Red, gold and dark blue				see Sport in South Australia
Tasmania		Bottle green, yellow and maroon				see Sport in Tasmania
Victoria		Navy blue and silver	White			see Sport in Victoria
Western Australia		Gold and black	White			see Sport in Western Australia

== Countries with limited or no recognition ==
These are the national colours for countries or states that have limited or no recognition.

Country	Flag	Primary colours	Secondary colours	Primary	Secondary	Further information
Abkhazia	(Abkhazia)	Green, white and red				
Kosovo		Blue, gold and white	Black			
Palestine		Black, white, green and red				
Somaliland	(Somaliland)	Green, white and red				
South Ossetia	(South Ossetia)	White, red and yellow				
Taiwan (Republic of China)		Blue, white and red	Verdigris (University Sports)			
Transnistria	(Transnistria)	Red and green				
Turkish Republic of Northern Cyprus	(Northern Cyprus)	Red and white				
Western Sahara (Sahrawi Arab Democratic Republic)		Black, white, green and red				

== Former countries ==
Country	Flag	Primary colours	Secondary colours	Primary	Secondary	Further information
Austria-Hungary	(Austria-Hungary)	Black and gold	Red, white and green			Flags of Austria-Hungary; Black and gold were the colours of the ruling Habsburg monarchy
Artsakh (Nagorno-Karabakh)	(Republic of Artsakh)	Red, blue and orange	White			
Byzantine Empire		Red, gold and purple				Byzantine flags and insignia
China (Republic of China, 1912–1949)		Blue, white and red				
Confederate States of America	(Confederate States of America)	Blue, white and red	Cadet grey			Cadet grey was an official colour of the Confederate States Army
Czechoslovakia	Czech Republic	Blue, white and red				
East Germany		Black, red and gold	Blue			National colours of Germany
France (Kingdom of France 987–1792, 1814–1848)		White and blue				French Blue, French Flags
German Empire		Black, white and red				German Flags
Göktürk Khaganate		Sky blue				
Holy Roman Empire		Gold and black	White and red			Flags of the Holy Roman Empire
Nazi Germany		Black, white and red	Brown			German Flags
Neutral Moresnet		Black, white and navy				
Portugal (Kingdom of Portugal 1139–1910)	(Kingdom of Portugal)	Blue and white				
Republic of Texas		red, white and blue				Texas is a current state of the United States but was a former independent republic from 1839–1845.
Rhodesia		Green				
Soviet Union		Red	Gold			
South Africa (pre-1994)		Orange, white and blue	Green (sports)			
South Yemen		Red, sky blue, white and black				
Yugoslavia		Blue, white and red				

=== Caliphates ===
Country	Flag	Primary colours	Secondary colours	Primary	Secondary	Further information
Umayyad Caliphate		White				
Abbasid Caliphate		Black				Black Standard
Fatimid Caliphate		White				
Ottoman Empire		Red				

=== Ancient/Imperial Chinese dynasties ===
Dynasty	Flag	Primary colours	Secondary colours	Primary	Secondary	Further information
Xia dynasty		Black, grue				Green/blue in China
Shang dynasty		White				
Zhou dynasty		Red				
Qin dynasty		Black				
Han dynasty		Black (206 BC-104 BC); Yellow (104 BC-26 AD); Red (26 AD-220 AD)				
Former Wei dynasty		Yellow				
Jin dynasty		Red				
Liu Song dynasty		Red				
Southern Qi dynasty		Red				Green/blue in China
Liang dynasty		Red				
Chen dynasty		Red				
Northern Wei dynasty		Yellow (399-491); Black (491-535)				
Northern Qi dynasty		Black				
Northern Zhou dynasty		Black				
Sui dynasty		Red				
Tang dynasty		Yellow (618-750); Reddish Yellow (750-907)				
Liao dynasty		Black				
Later Jin dynasty		White				
Song dynasty		Red				
Western Xia dynasty		White				
Jin dynasty		White				
Yuan dynasty		White				
Ming dynasty		Red				
Qing dynasty		Yellow				Imperial yellow jacket Yellow Dragon Flag

== Supranational organisations ==
Some noted supranational organisations like the United Nations and the European Union have their own colours as part of their branding and marketing. They are usually taken from the organisation's flag. Although they do not have national sporting teams, the colours can be used for anything connected to the organisation, like associated bodies.

Organisation	Flag	Primary colours	Secondary colours	Primary	Secondary	Further information
African Union		Green and gold				Flag of the African Union
Arab League		Green	Red, black and white			Flag of the Arab League, Pan-Arab colours
Association of Southeast Asian Nations		Blue, red and yellow	Brown			Flag of the Association of Southeast Asian Nations
Bay of Bengal Initiative for Multi-Sectoral Technical and Economic Cooperation		Green and yellow	Blue and white			
Caribbean Community	CARICOM	Sky blue, dark blue and yellow	Maroon (sports)			Maroon is the colour of the West Indies cricket team. Although they are not an officially part of CARICOM, most members of the community are members of the Cricket West Indies. CARICOM sees the organisation as an associated institute of Community.
Community of Portuguese Language Countries		Blue and white				Flag of the Community of Portuguese Language Countries
Eurasian Economic Union		White	Blue and gold			Flag of the Eurasian Economic Union
European Union	Europe	Reflex blue and gold				Flag of Europe
Mercosur		White and blue	Green			Flag of Mercosur
NATO		Dark Blue				Flag of NATO
Nordic Council	Nordic Council 2016	Blue and white				Flag of the Nordic Council; Design Manual of the Nordic Council - Colours
Organisation of Islamic Cooperation		White, green and black	Red			See Flag of the Organisation of Islamic Cooperation and Green in Islam
Organization of Turkic States		Turquoise				Although the flag of the Organization of Turkic States is light blue and white, turquoise is the colour most associated with the Turkic region.
South Asian Association for Regional Cooperation		Gold and white				
United Nations		Light blue and white				Flag of the United Nations

=== Examples of use of these colours ===
- United Nations: the recognisable blue helmets of the peacekeeping operations and the flags of associated UN agencies like the World Health Organization, with the UN's light blue and white.
- European Union: the blue and yellow of the EU flag; uses include the blue European Health Insurance Card and the Blue Card for skilled immigration.

== See also ==
- Tricolour
- List of international auto racing colours
- Lists of national symbols
