= Sport in Western Australia =

Sport is an important part of the culture of Western Australia.

== Major sports ==
=== Association Football (Soccer) ===
Association football is one of the most participated in sports in Western Australia.

The Perth Glory currently competes in the national A-League as the only representative from WA.

They were crowned A-League Premiers in the 2018-19 season. In the previous National Soccer League, Perth Glory was a relatively successful team by winning the last titles of the NSL (2002-03 & 2003-04). Perth Glory's home games are played at Perth Oval, although they have played finals at Perth Stadium.

=== Australian Rules Football ===
Australian rules football is the third most played sport in Western Australia and has a long history in the state having been played since 1868. Western Australia has two teams in the national league: the West Coast Eagles and the Fremantle Football Club (the "Fremantle Dockers"). Both teams use Optus Stadium as their home ground. The state's local league is the West Australian Football League (WAFL) with ten clubs representing metropolitan regions.

=== Basketball ===
Western Australia's number one basketball team is the Perth Wildcats of the National Basketball League. The Wildcats' sister team is the Perth Lynx of the Women's National Basketball League. Western Australia also has a second-tier basketball league, the NBL1 West Competition, with teams located in Perth, Mandurah, Bunbury, Kalgoorlie and Geraldton.

=== Cricket ===
Cricket is one of the main sports in Western Australia. Western Australia has a state cricket team, the Western Australian cricket team (Formerly the Western Warriors), based at the WACA Ground. They play in the Sheffield Shield and the One Day Cup Series. The Perth Scorchers also represent WA in the Twenty20 Big Bash domestic competition and have been the most successful franchise since the competition's inception. Since 2018, Perth Stadium hosts international Test and One Day International cricket matches.

=== Field hockey ===
Perth has a strong regional field hockey competition. There are many field hockey clubs for children, men, women and veterans (over 40 year of age). Western Australia contributes significantly to the national Australian men's and ladies' hockey teams which have both been winners of Olympic Gold Medals.

The Australian Institute of Sport hockey unit has been based in Perth since 1984, when it was the first sport to be decentralised.

The 6,000 seat Perth Hockey Stadium at Curtin University is the premier hockey venue in the state and is the home of state teams Perth Thundersticks and the WA Diamonds.

=== Netball ===
Netball is the highest female participation sport in females in Western Australia, with more than 150,000 participants. West Coast Fever plays in the Super Netball league, and is the premier netball team in WA. Their home court is Perth Arena.

=== Rugby league ===
The only professional rugby league team in WA is the upcoming Perth Bears.

Western Australia's first rugby league team to play in a national competition were the Western Reds, who played in the 1995 and 1996 seasons of the Australian Rugby League. In 1997 they changed their name to the Perth Reds and joined the Super League as inaugural members.

Despite showing some promise (particularly in the underage competitions) the Reds were not invited to join the National Rugby League in 1998 as part of the agreement to end the Super League war.

In 2006 the Western Australia Rugby League resurrected the team as the WA Reds to compete in the Jim Beam Cup (2008-2011) with a failed attempt to enter the National Rugby League competition in 2012. Their home ground is Perth Oval.

In 2012, the WA Reds were rebranded as the West Coast Pirates. Both West Coast Pirates and the WA Reds played out of Perth Oval in the under-age S. G. Ball Cup, with an aim to having a number of WA-born juniors when the bid joins the NRL West Coast Pirates in the 2022 NRL expansion.

The upcoming Perth Bears are set to be the only professional rugby league team in Western Australia, when it enters the National Rugby League (NRL) in 2027. A collaboration between the Western Australian Government and the Australian Rugby League Commission, the team will play out of a potentially upgraded Perth Rectangular Stadium. The team was announced on 9 May 2025, and will be the first professional rugby league team in the state since the demise of the Western Reds in 1997.

=== Rugby union ===
Western Australia is the home of the Western Force, a professional rugby union team which plays in Super Rugby. Their home ground is Perth Rectangular Stadium. The governing body Rugby Australia, under financial pressure due after funding bailouts to Rebels, Force and Reds, axed the Force from Super Rugby after the 2017 season. Andrew Forrest rescued the Perth-based Force and set up the World Series Rugby competition in 2018. From 2020, however, the Western Force were re-invited into the Super Rugby competition as Australia's fifth franchise in the tournament.

=== Swimming ===
Western Australia’s most popular sport, with the largest number of registered participants, is swimming, with competition and training carried out throughout the year.

See also: List of Western Australian Olympic and Paralympic medallists in swimming

The 20 km Rottnest Channel Swim is an individual and team swimming race from Cottesloe to Rottnest and is held annually. The FINA World Championships were held in Perth in 1991 and 1998.

=== Tennis ===
Western Australia, along with 2 other states, hosts the annual ATP Cup at Perth Arena starting in 2020. Previously, WA hosted the annual Hopman Cup mixed tennis tournament at Perth Arena (previously at the Burswood Dome) between the years of 1989 and 2019 annually. Davis Cup and Federation Cup ties have also been held at the Royal King's Park Tennis Club.

The annual Tennis West State League is the highest level of club tennis in the state, with the best 6 clubs in the state playing off against each other.

== Other sports ==
=== Athletics ===
The Western Australian Athletics Stadium opened in 2009. The main grandstand is named after Shirley Strickland.

=== Baseball ===
Baseball is becoming increasingly popular in Western Australia. Baseball WA is the governing body of baseball in Western Australia and oversees the organization of the sport in the area. The highest level of play in Australia is the Australian Baseball League (ABL) and has a team in Western Australia, the Perth Heat. The Heat won the inaugural championship during the 2010–2011 season and a further 3 championships in 2011-2012, 2013-2014, 2014–2015 and 15 total Claxton Shield Championships. The team plays at the Perth Harley-Davidson Ballpark.

=== Gel ball ===
Gel ball is a new but increasingly popular skirmish sport in Western Australia. Games are played at a number of locations across the state, usually at paintball fields. The Western Australia Airsoft and Gel Ball Club was established in 2017, and is the main lobbying body for the sport.

=== Golf ===
Normally at least one international golf tournament is held in WA each year, with the Johnnie Walker Classic at The Vines Resort & Country Club in Jan 2006 as part of both the European Tour and PGA Tour of Australasia. In past years international tournaments have also been held at the Karrinyup Country Club. The Heineken Classic was held in WA throughout the 1990s and was at times the richest tournament held in Australia.

=== Horse racing ===
Horse racing is very popular with a metropolitan race meeting every Saturday, fortnightly mid week meetings and weekly meetings at one of the major country centres. The Perth Cup is the state's premier race held each New Year's Day at Ascot Racecourse. The metropolitan tracks are Ascot for the spring and summer months and Belmont Park during the wetter autumn and winter months.

Harness racing is held all year round at Gloucester Park, with additional meeting in country areas. Greyhound racing is held at Cannington Raceway, Mandurah and Northam.

Many country towns have a racecourse and a major race day each year. These meetings are often the centrepiece of the communities activities, coinciding with other local events.

=== Lacrosse ===
In 2002, Perth hosted the World Lacrosse Games, which included the World Lacrosse Championships (won by the United States), the Australian Youth Lacrosse Championship, a Masters (35+ year old), Grandmasters (45+), and International Open Championships.

=== Motorsport ===
Motorsport is very popular in Western Australia with numerous national and international events being held.

Rally Australia, which is a part of the World Rally Championship (WRC) was held each year on the gravel roads in the south-west jarrah forests as well as special stages held in central Perth at either Gloucester Park or on Langley Park. It was recognised as one of the best rallies internationally and attracted thousands of overseas tourists each year. There has been a large push to have the event returned to Western Australia, as of 2016 there has not been any of the required support from the state government. The final running of the event in WA occurred in October 2006.

The first round of the Australian Rally Championship is held yearly in the forests near Nannup.

The Western Australian Rally Championship is held throughout the south west between March and November. The championship is host to some of the longest running rallies in the world and has seen increasing numbers of both competitors and spectators each year.

Targa West is held near Perth and Toodyay yearly and attracts large crowds. A similar event Targa South West is held yearly in the southwest towns of Pemberton and Manjimup.

Wanneroo Raceway hosts the Perth super sprint, a Supercars Championship round first held in 1973.

=== Rowing/kayaking ===
The Champion Lakes Regatta Centre south of Perth includes a 2,000 metre buoyed racing course used for rowing, kayaking and dragon boat racing.

Perth is also home to the annual Avon Descent whitewater event.

The PSA Head of the River rowing event is held each year.

=== Sailing ===
A Mediterranean climate with reliable fresh winds create ideal conditions for sailing, both off the coast in the Indian Ocean and in the Swan River.

Perth hosted the ISAF Sailing World Championships at Fremantle in 2011.

There are numerous yacht clubs in Perth and regional centres.

=== Water polo ===
A number of decorated international players have come from Perth. The Tom Hoad Cup is held each December.

=== Fistball ===
In 2023 Former West Coast Eagles Will Schofield started the first ever WA Fistball side The ID Athletic Western Fisters, The first tournament they entered was on 16 December 2023 in Geelong.

== List of professional sport teams from Western Australia ==
A list of professional sports teams from Western Australia who have won national competitions. Current as of 28 October 2023.

=== Men's competitions ===
Team	Sport	Competition	EST	Home venue	Total championships	Year of championship/s
Western Australia cricket team	Cricket	Sheffield Shield	1893*	WACA Ground	18	1948, 1968, 1972, 1973, 1975, 1977 1978, 1981, 1984, 1987, 1988, 1989 1992, 1998, 1999, 2022, 2023, 2024
Western Australia Australian rules football team	Australian rules	AFL Origin	1904	Perth Stadium	6	1921, 1961, 1979, 1983, 1984, 1986
Perth Wildcats	Basketball	NBL	1982	Perth Arena	10	1990, 1991, 1995, 2000, 2010, 2014 2016, 2017, 2019, 2020
Perth Heat	Baseball	ABL	1989	Empire Ballpark	6	1991, 1997, 2011, 2012, 2014, 2015
Perth Scorchers	Cricket	BBL	2011	Perth Stadium	5	2014, 2015, 2017, 2022, 2023
West Coast Eagles	Australian rules	AFL	1986	Perth Stadium	4	1992, 1994, 2006, 2018
Perth Glory	Soccer	A-League	1995	HBF Park	2	2002–03, 2003–04
Perth Steel	Volleyball	AVSL Men	2018	Warwick Stadium	1	2023
Fremantle Dockers	Australian rules	AFL	1994	Perth Stadium	0	N/A
Perth Thundersticks	Hockey	Hockey One (Men)	1991*	Perth Hockey Stadium	0	N/A
Western Force	Rugby union	Super Rugby	2004*	HBF Park	0	N/A
Western Fisters	Fistball	Fistball Australia	2023	N/A	1	2025
Perth Bears	Rugby League	NRL	2027	HBF Park	0	N/A

=== Women's competitions ===
Team		Competition	EST	Home venue	Total championships	Year of championship/s
West Coast Fever	Netball	Super Netball League	2008*	Perth Arena	1	2022
Perth Scorchers (W)	Cricket	WBBL	2015	WACA Ground	1	2022
Western Australia women's cricket team	Cricket	WNCL	1996	WACA Ground	1	1997
Perth Lynx	Basketball	WNBL	1988	Perth HPC	1	1992
Perth Thundersticks (W)	Hockey	Hockey One (Women)	2019	Perth Hockey Stadium	1	2024
Perth Steel (W)	Volleyball	AVSL Women	2018	Warwick Stadium	1	2023
West Coast Eagles (W)	Australian rules	AFLW	2020	Lathlain Park	0	N/A
Fremantle Dockers (W)	Australian rules	AFLW	2017	Fremantle Oval	0	N/A
Western Force (W)	Rugby	Super Rugby Women's	2017	HBF Park	0	N/A
Perth Glory (W)	Soccer	W-League	2007	Sam Kerr Football Centre	0	N/A

* Indicates that the team entered the competition they currently participate in years after they were established, ie they may have participated in a former competition before joining their current one. Only the championships won in the competition they currently participate in are listed.

== Events ==
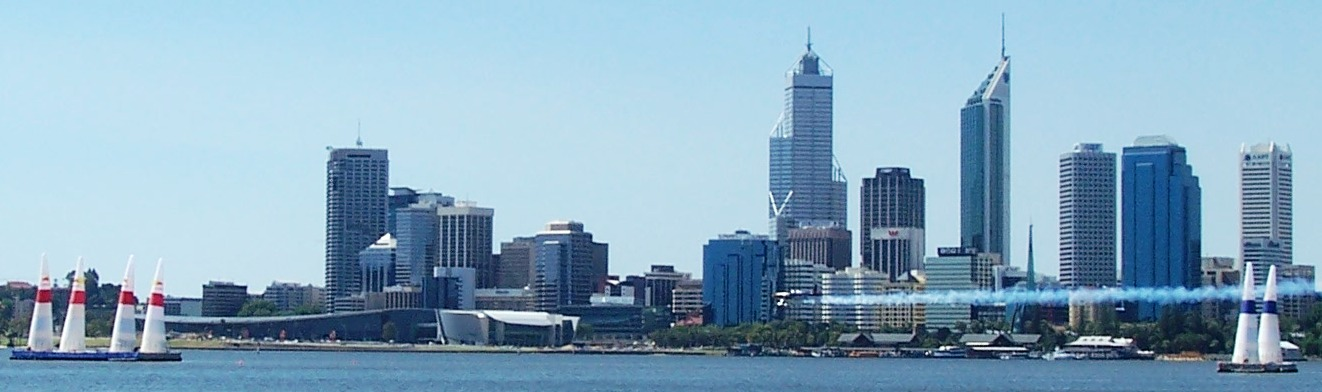
The Perth leg of the Red Bull Air Race World Series 2006

Perth has hosted a number of international and national sporing events, including:

- the 1921, 1937, 1956, 1972 and 1979 Australian National Football Carnivals
- the 1962 British Empire and Commonwealth Games
- the 1967 World Netball Tournament
- the 1979 Australian Grand Prix
- the 1987 America's Cup
- the 1991 and 1998 World Aquatics Championships
- the 2006 Gravity Games
- rounds in the 2006, 2007, 2008 and 2010 Red Bull Air Race World Championship
- the 2019 WMF World Cup
- rounds in the V8 Supercars
- the Avon Descent (annually)
- the City to Surf (annually)
- the Hopman Cup (annually)
- the Rottnest Channel Swim (annually)
- the Tom Hoad Cup (annually)
- the 2021 AFL Grand Final

== Awards ==
Two sports awards are given each year:

- The Western Australian Sports Star of the Year is an individual award made to a current sportsperson selected by a committee of sports writers from The West Australian and members of the Western Australian Sports Federation, and chaired by Ron Alexander, director-general of the Department of Sport and Recreation. The award has been given since 1956.
- A second award, induction to the Western Australian Hall of Champions has been made since 1983 and honours a number of sportspeople who, as products of the Western Australian sporting system, have achieved the highest level of competition. Recipients must have been retired from open competition for at least five years. The selection committee includes several prominent sports identities and members of the Western Australian Institute of Sport.
