= List of Western Australian Olympic and Paralympic medallists in swimming =

List of Western Australian swimmers who have won a medal at the Summer Olympic Games or Summer Paralympic Games. Most athletes have been inducted into Swimming WA Hall of Fame.

Name	Year / Games	Location	Age at Games	Gold	Silver	Bronze	World Records	Individual/Relay Medals
Kevin O'Halloran	1956 Summer Olympics	Melbourne	19	1			1	4 × 200 m Freestyle Relay
David Dickson	1960 Summer Olympics	Rome	19			1		4 × 200 m Freestyle Relay
David Dickson	1964 Summer Olympics	Tokyo	23			2		4 × 100 m Freestyle Relay, 4 × 100 m Medley Relay
John Ryan	1964 Summer Olympics	Tokyo	20			1		4x100 Freestyle Relay
Elizabeth Edmondson	1964 Summer Olympics	Tokyo	14	3			3	Individual
Frank Ponta	1964 Summer Paralympics	Tokyo	29	1				Individual
Elizabeth Edmondson	1968 Summer Paralympics	Tel Aviv	18	2	1		2	Individual
Lynne Watson	1968 Summer Olympics	Mexico City	16		1			4 × 100 m Medley Relay
Lyn McClements	1968 Summer Olympics	Mexico City	17	1	1			Individual, 4 × 100 m Medley Relay
Lorraine Dodd	1968 Summer Paralympics	Tel Aviv	24	3			3	Individual
Frank Ponta	1968 Summer Paralympics	Tel Aviv	33			1		Individual
Neil Brooks	1980 Summer Olympics	Moscow	18	1	2	3		4 × 100 m Medley Relay
Peter Evans	1980 Summer Olympics	Moscow	19	1		1		Individual, 4 × 100 m Medley Relay
Peter Evans	1984 Summer Olympics	Los Angeles	23			2		4 × 100 m Medley/Individual
Neil Brooks	1984 Summer Olympics	Los Angeles	22		1	1		4 × 100 m Freestyle,4 × 100 m Medley
Kingsley Bugarin	1984 Summer Paralympics	New York City	16		2	1		Individual
Kingsley Bugarin	1988 Summer Paralympics	Seoul	20			3		Individual
Sandra Yaxley	1988 Summer Paralympics	Seoul	19	1	1			Individual, 4x50m Freestyle Relay
Julia Greville	1996 Summer Olympics	Atlanta	17			1		4 × 200 m Freestyle Relay
Helen Denman	1996 Summer Olympics	Atlanta	20		1			4 × 100 m Medley Relay
Priya Cooper	1992 Summer Paralympics	Barcelona	18	3	2		2	Individual
Sandra Yaxley	1992 Summer Paralympics	Barcelona	23	1		1		Individual, 4x50m Freestyle Relay
Kingsley Bugarin	1992 Summer Paralympics	Barcelona	24		3	1		Individual
Tracey Cross	1992 Summer Paralympics	Barcelona	20	2	2			Individual
Priya Cooper	1996 Summer Paralympics	Atlanta	22	5	1	1	2	Individual, 4 × 100 m Freestyle Relay
Tracey Cross	1996 Summer Paralympics	Atlanta	24	2	1			Individual
Kingsley Bugarin	1996 Summer Paralympics	Atlanta	28	3	2	1		Individual
Todd Pearson	2000 Summer Olympics	Sydney	23	2			2	4 × 100 m Freestyle Relay, 4 × 200 m Freestyle Relay
Bill Kirby	2000 Summer Olympics	Sydney	25	1			1	4 × 200 m Freestyle
Priya Cooper	2000 Summer Paralympics	Sydney	26	1		3		Individual, 4 × 100 m Freestyle, 4 × 100 m Medley
Tracey Cross	2000 Summer Paralympics	Sydney	28		2	1		Individual
Kingsley Bugarin	2000 Sydney Paralympics	Sydney	32	2	1			Individual
Antony Matkovich	2004 Summer Olympics	Athens	27		1			4 × 200 m Freestyle Relay
Todd Pearson	2004 Summer Olympics	Athens	27		1			4 × 200 m Freestyle Relay
Eamon Sullivan	2008 Summer Olympics	Beijing	23		2	1		Individual, 4 × 100 m Medley Relay, 4 × 100 m Freestyle Relay
Katrina Porter	2008 Summer Paralympics	Beijing	20	1			1	Individual
Tommaso D'Orsogna	2012 Summer Olympics	London	22			1		4 × 100 m Medley Relay
Tamsin Cook	2016 Summer Olympics	Rio de Janeiro	17		1			4 × 200 m Freestyle Relay

== See also ==
- Sport in Western Australia
- Swimming in Australia
- List of Australian Olympic medallists in swimming
