= National colours and symbols of Greece =

Blue and white

The Flag of Greece since 1978, and the nation's naval ensign and co-national flag from 1822 to 1978, are in the national colours

The national colours of Greece are blue and white.

Blue and white are also the national colours of Argentina, El Salvador, Guatemala,, Honduras, and Nicaragua, were the former national colours of Portugal, and are the colours of the United Nations.

== History ==
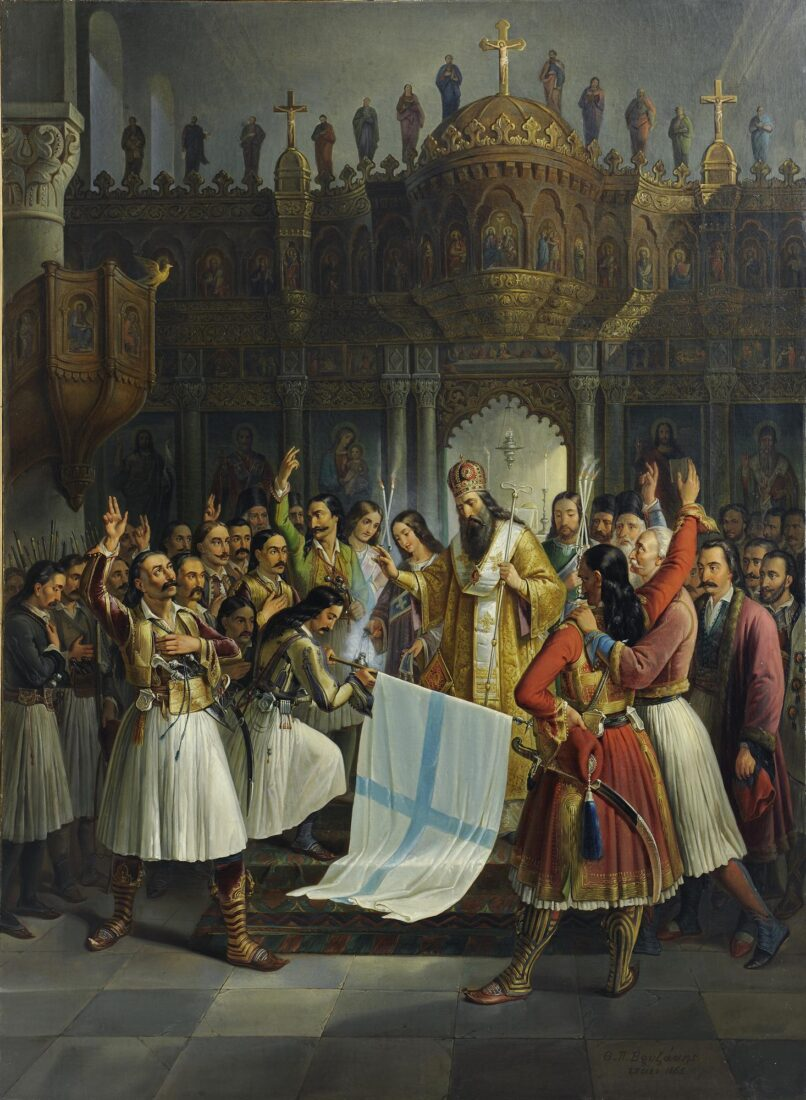
An 1852 oil painting by Theodoros Vryzakis illustrating bishop Germanos III of Old Patras blessing the blue and white Greek banner at Agia Lavra at the outset of the national revolt against the Ottoman Empire on 25 March 1821.

Blue and white appear to have been historically used by Greeks for several centuries, and were used during revolts against the Ottomans prior to the 1821 revolution. In March 1821, the Greek War of Independence broke out, an effort by the Greeks to free themselves from the Ottoman rule by declaring independence. The struggle to secure independence would continue until 1832. Later in the year, deputies from various provinces of Greece assembled at Piada (near Epidaurus, and today known as Nea Epidauros) in the First National Assembly to draft the first Greek Constitution, which was published on 1 January 1822. The Constitution of 1822 was the first of many which would lead to the modern Constitution.

In addition to the constitution, the delegates selected Athens as the new national capital, though it had yet to be conquered from the Ottoman Empire. They also selected a new standard for the troops, a "white cross on an azure field", a new naval flag, and new national colours, sky blue and white; the new colours replaced those used by Alexander Ypsilantis, and the black used by the Filiki Eteria, and were specified in the Constitution. The flag was raised at the Acrocorinth after its capture on 26 June 1822.

In the Greco-Italian War, during which Italian forces occupied parts of Greece in 1940 and 1941, Greek civilians in Pothia would taunt the occupying forces by painting their houses in blue and white. Some houses still retain this colouration among the more typical pink and ochre buildings.

== Symbols and decorations ==
The current coat of arms of Greece, in the national colours, was established on 7 June 1975

The coat of arms of Greece consists of a white cross on a blue escutcheon which is surrounded by two laurel branches. Although the tincture for the branches is designated as "proper", which implies the colour found in nature, it is usually displayed with blue laurel branches; the president, military, and security services use golden branches instead. The Flag of Greece is also blue and white, as defined by Law 851/1978 Regarding the National Flag. It specifies the colour of "cyan" (Greek: κυανό, kyano), meaning "blue", so the shade of blue is ambiguous.

The Order of the Redeemer and military decoration Cross of Valour both have ribbons in the national colours.

The national animal of Greece is the Dolphin.

The national bird of Greece is the Little owl.

The national flower of Greece is the Bear's Breech (also known as the Acanthus).

== Sport ==
An official report from the 1896 Summer Olympics stated that pigeons adorned with ribbons in the national colours were released from Panathenaic Stadium after Spyridon Louis, winner of the marathon, was introduced to accept his medal and a trophy.
