= Tennis West State League =

Tennis league

Men's State League
- Sport: Tennis
- First season: 1966/67
- CEO: Olivia Birkett
- Administrator: Tennis West
- No. of teams: 5
- Country: Australia
- Headquarters: Perth, Western Australia
- Most recent champion: Claremont Lawn (2025/26)
- Most titles: Hensman Park (12)
- Streaming partner: YouTube
- Tournament format: 10 rounds + 2 finals
- Website: https://www.tennis.com.au/wa/players/competitions/wa-tennis-league/results-fixtures

The Tennis West State League is an Australian semi-professional tennis league based in Perth, Western Australia. It is the annual 'A' grade/division 1 shield competition for tennis in Western Australia, the highest level of club competition in the state. The competition is administered by Tennis West, the governing body of the sport in the state. It plays a pivotal role in the development of elite tennis players.

Both the Men's and Women's State League seasons consist of 10 match (or home-and-away) season, which runs from October to March (including a Summer break in January), with six teams playing in each season. The top four teams then play off in a two-round finals series, culminating in the State League Grand Final, which is hosted by highest ranked grand final team from the end of the home-and-away season. The grand final winners are termed the champions, with the men's shield known as the David Blacklock Memorial Shield, and the women's is known as the Laurie Toole Memorial Shield.

Peppermint Grove Tennis Club won the 2024/25 Men's State League Season, claiming their first championship in club history. Hensman Park Tennis Club are the most recent Women's Champions, claiming four out of the past five women's championships.

Women's State League
- Sport: Tennis
- First season: 1966/67
- CEO: Olivia Birkett
- Administrator: Tennis West
- No. of teams: 6
- Country: Australia
- Headquarters: Perth, Western Australia
- Most recent champion: Cottesloe (2025/26)
- Most titles: Fremantle (11)
- Streaming partner: YouTube
- Tournament format: 10 rounds + 2 finals
- Website: https://www.tennis.com.au/wa/players/competitions/wa-tennis-league/results-fixtures

== Current Participants ==
The clubs participating in the 2026/27 season are seen below. Notably, Alexander Park Tennis Club leave the Men's competition with only five teams playing. Scarborough Tennis Club rejoin the women's competition after "considerable absence."

=== Men's ===
2026/27 Men's State League Participants
Club	Home Surface		Most Recent	Captain
Claremont Lawn Tennis Club	Hard	5	2025/26	TBC
Cottesloe Tennis Club	Grass	9	2023/24	TBC
Mount Lawley Tennis Club	Grass	0	N/A	TBC
Royal Kings Park Tennis Club	Grass	3	1988/89	TBC
UWA Tennis Club	Clay	4	2003/04	TBC

Alexander Park Tennis Club did not enter a side.

=== Women's ===
2026/27 Women's State League Participants
Club	Home Surface		Most Recent	Captain
Cottesloe Tennis Club	Grass	8	2016/17	TBC
Dalkeith Tennis Club	Hard Court	0	N/A	TBC
Hensman Park Tennis Club	Hard Court	5	2024/25	TBC
Royal Kings Park Tennis Club	Grass	7	2018/19	TBC
Scarborough Tennis Club	Grass	0	N/A	TBC
UWA Tennis Club	Clay	1	2007/08	TBC

Scarborough Tennis Club play their first season after a considerable absence.

== List of Champion Clubs ==
Hensman Park Tennis Club have won the most championships in the men's competition with 12, there most recent coming in the 2021/22 season. Fremantle Tennis Club have won the most championships in the women's competition with 11, although currently having a 41-year drought, winning all 11 of their shields in the first 15 seasons of the competition. The most successful club throughout both competitions having 17 championships is Hensman Park Tennis Club with 12 championships in the men's competition and 5 in the women's. They have been the most successful club over the past 6 years winning 6 championships since 2020 across both the men's and women's competition.

The most recent men's champion is the Claremont Lawn, defeating Cottesloe 4–0 in the 2025/26 men's grand final. This was their first championship since 1975. Cottesloe are the most recent women's champions, defeating Royal Kings Park Tennis Club 4-0 in the final. It was their first women's championship since 2017. Bolded years won in the table below signifies the most recent champion (2025/26 season).

Men's and Women's State League Champions
Men			Women		
Team		Year(s) won	Team		Year(s) won
Hensman Park	12	1985/86, 1991/92, 2005/06, 2006/07, 2007/08, 2008/09, 2010/11, 2014/15, 2016/17, 2018/19, 2020/21, 2021/22	Fremantle	11	1972/73, 1973/74, 1974/75, 1975/76, 1978/79, 1979/80, 1981/82, 1982/83, 1983/84, 1984/85
Cottesloe	9	1996/97, 2000/01, 2003/04, 2009/10, 2011/12, 2012/13, 2015/16, 2022/23, 2023/24	Cottesloe	8	1993/94, 1995/96, 1996/97, 1998/99, 2009/10, 2010/11, 2016/17, **2025/26**
Dalkeith	8	1986/87, 1987/88, 1989/90, 1990/91, 1992/93, 1993/94, 1998/99, 1999/00	Nedlands	8	1976/77, 1985/86, 1986/87, 1987/88, 2001/02, 2002/03, 2003/04, 2005/06
Claremont	5	1967/68, 1968/69, 1969/70, 1974/75, **2025/26**	Royal Kings Park	7	1968/69, 1970/71, 1971/72, 1991/92, 1992/93, 2017/18, 2018/19
UWA	4	1970/71, 1971/72, 2001/02, 2002/03	Blue Gum Park	7	1988/89, 1994/95, 1997/98, 2000/01, 2004/05, 2014/15, 2015/16
Royal Kings Park	3	1966/67, 1972/73, 1988/89	Hensman Park	5	2012/13, 2020/21, 2021/22, 2023/24, 2024/25
Scarborough	3	1981/82, 1983/84, 1984/85	City Beach	4	2006/07, 2008/09, 2011/12, 2013/14
Bayswater	3	1973/74, 1975/76, 1978/79	Reabold	2	1989/90, 1990/91
Reabold	2	1995/96, 2004/05	UWA	1	2007/08
Maylands	2	1980/81, 1982/83	Wembley Downs	1	1999/00
Fremantle	2	1976/77, 1977/78	Higgins Park	1	1980/81
Peppermint Grove	1	2024/25	Claremont	1	1969/70
Mosman Park	1	2017/18	Alexander Park	1	1967/68
Greenwood	1	2013/14	Loton Park	1	1966/67
Sorrento	1	1997/98			
Wembley Downs	1	1994/95			
Higgins Park	1	1979/80			

=== Combined Champion Club ===
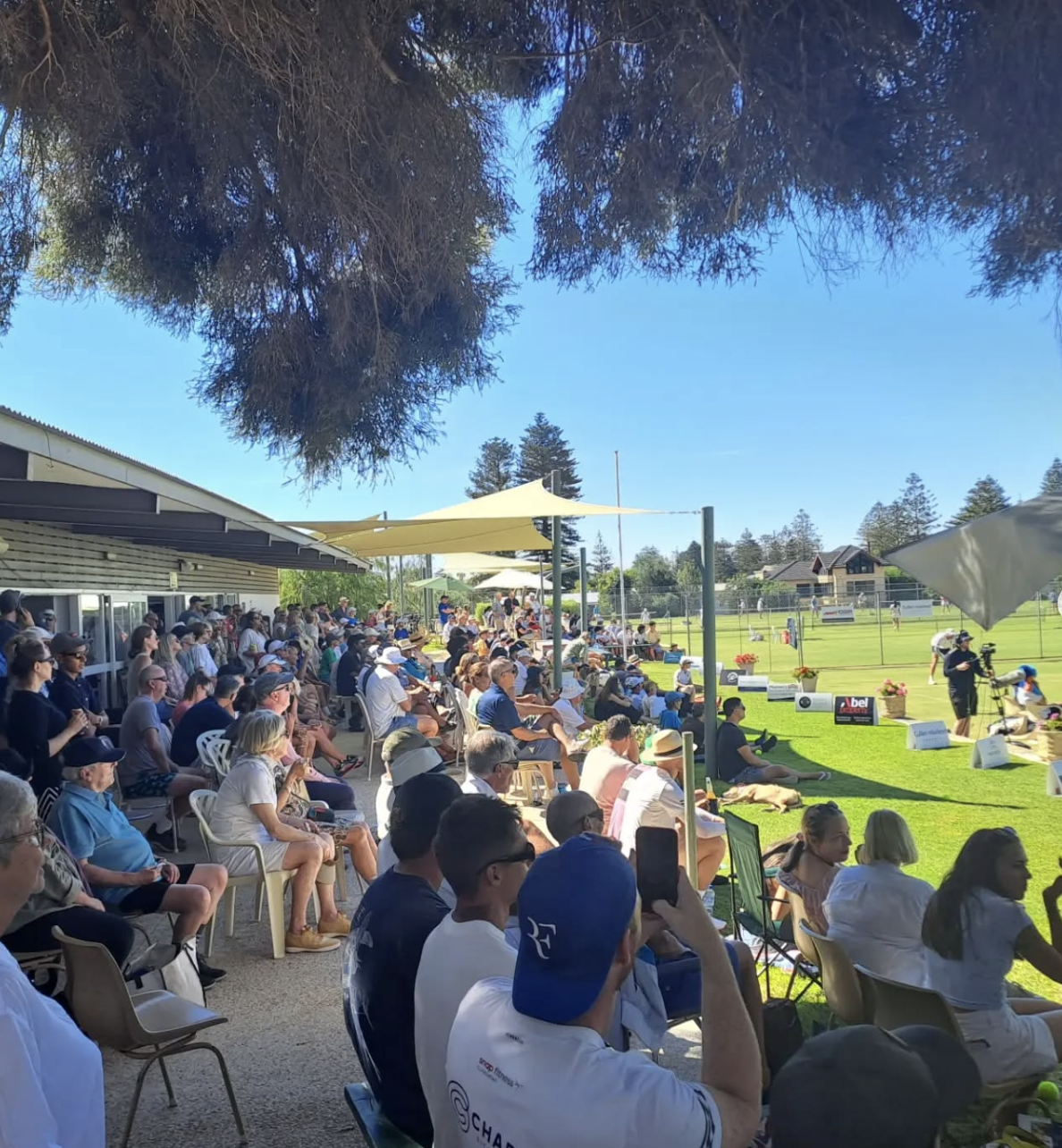
A crowd watching on at the Cottesloe Tennis Club for the 2023/24 Men's State League Grand Final played between Cottesloe and Peppermint Grove.

The table below shows the clubs with the most State League Championships in the men's and women's competition combined. Hensman Park Tennis Club are the most successful club amongst both gender formats, with 17 championships, there most recent coming in the 2024/25 Women's State League season.

Rank	Club	Total	Most Recent
1	Cottesloe	17	2025/26 (F)
1	Hensman Park	17	2024/25 (F)
3	Fremantle	13	1984/85 (F)
4	Royal Kings Park	10	2018/19 (F)
5	Dalkeith	8	1999/00 (M)
5	Nedlands	8	2005/06 (F)
7	Blue Gum Park	7	2015/16 (F)
8	Claremont Lawn	6	2025/26 (M)
9	UWA	5	2007/08 (F)
10	Reabold	4	2004/05 (M)
10	City Beach	4	2013/14 (F)

All championships are correct to the completion of the 2025/26 State League Seasons.

== Most Valuable Player Award ==
Tennis West has awarded a Most Valuable Player (MVP) award since the 2001/02 season. The MVP is awarded to the player with the most individual wins in each season, across there singles and doubles matches.

Cameron Fenner (Hensman Park Tennis Club) has won the most men's MVPs with three titles (2006/07, 2007/08, 2008/09).

Donna Blackwell (City Beach Tennis Club) has won the most women's MVPs with four titles (2004/05, 2006/07, 2007/08, 2008/09).

Most MVPs (men)
Player	Club	MVPs	Seasons
Cameron Fenner	Hensman Park Tennis Club	3	06/07, 07/08, 08/09
Richard Sampson	Sorrento Tennis Club	2	03/04, 11/12
Miles Armstrong	Hensman Park Tennis Club Greenwood Tennis Club	2	12/13, 14/15
Joel Pleydell	Cottesloe Tennis Club	2	15/16, 17/18
Sam Ashendon	Royal Kings Park Tennis Club	2	16/17, 18/19
Max Weir	Cottesloe Tennis Club	2	22/23, 25/26
Will Hann	Cottesloe Tennis Club	2	23/24, 24/25

Most MVPs (women)
Player	Club	MVPs	Seasons
Donna Blackwell	City Beach Tennis Club	4	04/05, 06/07, 07/08, 08/09
Nina Catovic	Blue Gum Park Tennis Club	3	14/15, 17/18, 18/19
Bojana Bobusic	Cottesloe Tennis Club Royal Kings Park Tennis Club	2	09/10, 17/18
Katy O’Shea	City Beach Tennis Club Blue Gum Park Tennis Club	2	11/12, 16/17
Siobhan Drake-Brockman	Nedlands Tennis Club	2	01/02, 05/06

== Match Format ==
Each match consists of 6 individual matches, known as rubbers. There are four singles and two doubles rubbers in each match. Each rubber is best of three sets, with the third set played as a match tiebreak (first to ten points), if required. The winning team on the day is decided by the total rubbers won, followed by sets won, then games won. If all three of these factors are tied, the match is declared a draw.

== Broadcast ==
As of the 2025/26 season, all matches are broadcast live on YouTube and Facebook, with live scoring available online via Scorebuzzer.

Matches were previously broadcast on Streamer between the 2021/22 and 2024/25 seasons. One match each round was broadcast on Streamer in the 2022/23 season. In October 2023, Tennis West and Streamer signed a deal which has all State League matches broadcast, with one 'feature match' each round containing commentary.

== Notable Players ==
A number of internationally and nationally recognised tennis professionals have competed in the Tennis West State League while representing local clubs, highlighting the competition's role in connecting elite talent with Western Australian club tennis.

Men's Professional Players

Players with ATP Tour experience who have competed in the State League include:

- Matthew Ebden - An Australian professional with multiple Grand Slam doubles titles and a top 50 doubles ranking, played for Wembley Downs Tennis Club during the 2011–12 State League season.
- Brydan Klein - Aformer Australian junior champion and ATP Tour competitor who reached a top 200 singles ranking, played in the State League for Alexander Park Tennis Club.
- John Peers - An Australian doubles specialist and Grand Slam winner, has appeared in State League competition representing Mosman Park Tennis Club.
- Miles Armstrong - A former Australian tennis player with a career high ranking of 268 on the ATP tour won two State League MVP awards for Greenwood Tennis Club.

Women's Professional Players

The league has also included high-profile women's tennis professionals:

- Alicia Molik, former WTA world No. 8, Olympic medallist, and Australian Open quarter-finalist, captained Cottesloe Tennis Club in the Women's State League.
- Maddison Inglis, a Perth‑born professional with a career‑high WTA singles ranking inside the world's top 120. She played in the State League for Cottesloe Tennis Club as a junior.
- Storm Hunter, a professional with significant doubles success on the WTA Tour, who played in the State League prior to focusing on her international career.

These examples illustrate the State League's role as both a competitive platform for elite players and a bridge between professional and club-level tennis in Western Australia. By attracting professional players to compete in club teams, the league provides local communities with opportunities to witness high-standard tennis and supports player development pathways across the state.

== Junior State League ==
The Tennis West Junior State League is the highest level of junior interclub tennis competition administered by Tennis West in Western Australia. The competition provides a pathway for emerging high-performance junior players to gain competitive experience and develop towards senior State League tennis.

The competition consists of separate boys' and girls' competitions. The boys' competition is known as the Rob Kilderry Cup, while the girls' competition is known as the Casey Dellacqua Cup, named after prominent Western Australian tennis figures Rob Kilderry and Casey Dellacqua. Teams represent affiliated tennis clubs, with the competition played in a home-and-away format.

The Junior State League has expanded in recent seasons, with the 2025–26 competition featuring eight boys' teams and six girls' teams. The 2026–27 season retains eight boys' teams and six girls' teams. The list of teams playing in the 2026/27 season can be found below.

2026/27 Rob Kilderry Cup Participants
Club	Home Surface
Applecross Tennis Club 1	Grass
Applecross Tennis Club 1	Grass
Cottesloe Tennis Club	Grass
Hensman Park	Hard
Mount Lawley Tennis Club	Grass
North Beach Tennis Club	Grass
Scarborough Tennis Club	Grass
UWA Tennis Club	Clay

2026/27 Casey Dellacqua Cup Participants
Club	Home Surface
Cottesloe Tennis Club	Grass
Greenwood Tennis Club	Hard
Hensman Park	Hard
Mount Lawley Tennis Club	Grass
North Beach Tennis Club	Grass
UWA Tennis Club	Clay

== Recent Criticism ==
In recent years, the Tennis West State League has faced public criticism from Western Australian tennis clubs and members of Perth's tennis community. Commentary shared through independent community platforms argued that the competition had declined in structure, promotion, and strategic direction, despite being regarded as the flagship club competition in the state. This was also seen with the women's competition falling to just five participants in the 2025–26 season.

Critics stated that the league was no longer meeting expectations as an elite development pathway, with major concerns raised about inadequate support and funding for clubs, limited promotion of matches, and a lack of a clear long-term vision. Players, coaches and clubs highlighted the significant time and resources invested in preparing State League teams, expressing frustration that these efforts were not matched by organisational leadership or transparency. In addition, several tennis clubs publicly voiced concerns about governance at Tennis West, including calls from some clubs for changes in leadership and administrative strategy, reflecting broader dissatisfaction from parts of the WA tennis community.

== See also ==
- Tennis Australia
- Tennis in Australia
