= Cottesloe Tennis Club =

Coordinates: 31.9923°S 115.7549°E

- League: Tennis West State League
- Established: 1903
- Location: Cottesloe, Western Australia
- President: Rob Wilde
- Vice-president: Grant O'Connell
- Championships: 17

Cottesloe Tennis Club, founded in 1903, is a tennis club in Cottesloe, Western Australia. The club has been a central part of the local sports community, providing facilities for players of all ages and skill levels. It is one of the oldest and most prestigious tennis clubs in Western Australia, known for its strong membership base and commitment to promoting the sport. The club participates in the Tennis West State League in both the men's and women's competitions, while offering adult and junior pennant teams in the WA Tennis League.

== History ==
Cottesloe Tennis Club was founded in early 1903 with two bitumen courts in Irvine Street, Peppermint Grove. In 1924, the club relocated to the corner of Marine Parade and Warnham Street, where it established four courts and a small clubhouse. As the club grew, it moved to its present location in 1938 at the corner of Broome and Napier Streets in Cottesloe, expanding to fifteen courts.

In 2017, the club expanded once again and now features 10 lighted hard courts and 27 grass courts. Over the years, it has hosted numerous local and regional tournaments, attracting players from across the state. Cottesloe Tennis Club hosted the Davis Cup playoff match between Australia and Uzbekistan in 2014.

== State League ==
Cottesloe Tennis Club are one of the most significant and successful clubs in State League history. They compete in the Tennis West State League for both the men's and women's competition. The Tennis West State League is the highest level of tennis in Western Australia, showcasing some of the best local and international talent. The club's teams regularly contend for the competition's championship.

=== State League history ===
Cottesloe have won 17 championships across the men's and women's competition, the second most successful club in the league's history, behind Hensman Park Tennis Club. They have won the men's competition 9 times in the 1996/97, 2000/01, 2003/04, 2009/10, 2011/12, 2012/13, 2015/16, 2022/23 and 2023/24 seasons.

Cottesloe have also won 8 titles in the women's competition, winning in the 1993/94, 1995/96, 1996/97, 1998/99, 2009/10, 2010/11, 2016/17, and 2025/26 seasons.

Australian tennis legend and two-time doubles Grand Slam champion Alicia Molik is the captain of the women's state league team.

Current Australian professional tennis player Maddison Inglis played for the Cottesloe Tennis Club before she made the WTA Tour. She made her State League debut in 2011, at just 13 years old, making her one of the youngest players in State League history. Storm Sanders also played State League tennis for Cottesloe, playing at just 16 years of age, before she moved to Victoria.

=== MVP winners ===
Cottesloe has been a host to many of the league's MVP winners.

Men			Women		
Player	MVPs	Season/s	Player	MVPs	Season/s
Max Weir	2	2022/23, 2025/26	Elena Manoj	1	2025/26
Will Hann	2	2023/24, 2024/25	Madeleine Watson	1	2010/11
Joel Pleydell	2	2015/16, 2017/18	Bojana Bobusic	1	2009/10
Callum Beale	1	2009/10	Bojana Bobusic	1	2009/10
