= Alicia Molik =

Australian tennis player (born 1981)

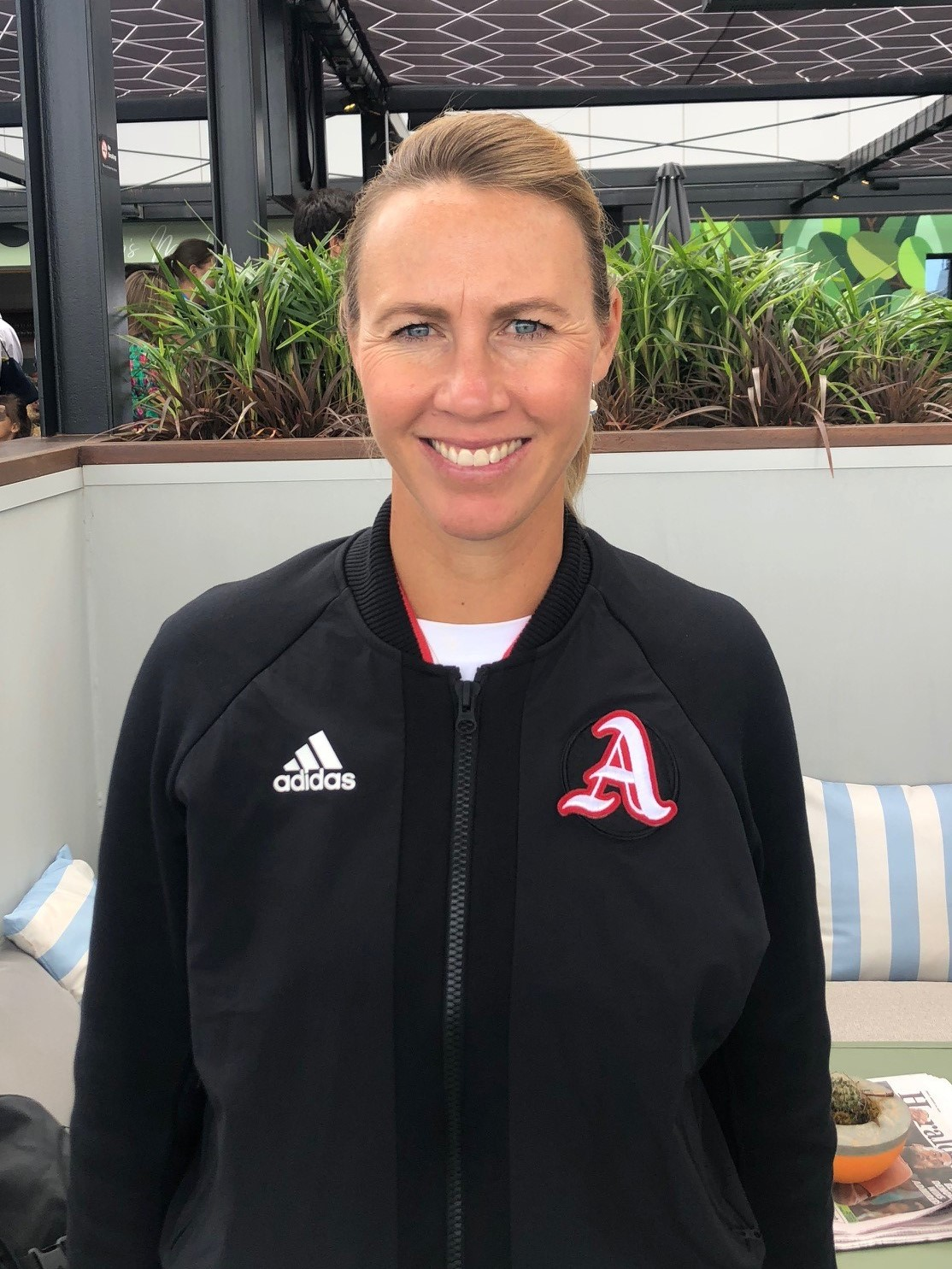
- Molik in 2020
- Country (sports): Australia
- Born: 27 January 1981 (age 45) Adelaide, South Australia
- Height: 1.82 m (6 ft 0 in)
- Turned pro: 1996
- Retired: 2011
- Plays: Right-handed (one-handed backhand)
- Prize money: $3,185,805

Singles
- Career record: 346–248
- Career titles: 5
- Highest ranking: No. 8 (28 February 2005)

Grand Slam singles results
- Australian Open: QF (2005)
- French Open: 3R (1999, 2006)
- Wimbledon: 3R (2003, 2004)
- US Open: 3R (2001, 2003)

Other tournaments
- Olympic Games: Bronze (2004)

Doubles
- Career record: 214–174
- Career titles: 7
- Highest ranking: No. 6 (6 June 2005)

Grand Slam doubles results
- Australian Open: W (2005)
- French Open: W (2007)
- Wimbledon: SF (2007)
- US Open: QF (2005)

Team competitions
- Fed Cup: 18–21
- Hopman Cup: F (2003)

Alicia Molik (born 27 January 1981) is an Australian former professional tennis player. She reached a career-high singles ranking of world No. 8 and a career-high doubles ranking of world No. 6.

Molik won a bronze medal in singles for Australia at the 2004 Summer Olympics by upsetting the then-world No. 3 and reigning French Open champion Anastasia Myskina. She also won the 2004 Zurich Open, defeating Maria Sharapova in the final, and reached the quarterfinals of the 2005 Australian Open. Molik won Grand Slam doubles titles at the 2005 Australian Open with Svetlana Kuznetsova, and at the 2007 French Open with Mara Santangelo. She also reached the finals of three mixed doubles major tournaments: at the 2004 Wimbledon Championships, the 2004 US Open, and the 2007 Wimbledon Championships.

Shortly after the 2005 Australian Open, Molik contracted an inner-ear infection. The infection developed into vestibular neuronitis, which kept her out of competition until May 2006. Molik was never able to replicate her pre-ailment singles results, even though she returned to the top 60 a year later. She retired in August 2008, but she returned a year later in September 2009. Her last match was a second-round loss at the 2011 Australian Open to Nadia Petrova.

Molik is the current captain of the Cottesloe Tennis Club in the Tennis West Women's State League competition.

== Career ==
She won her first Grand Slam doubles title at the 2005 Australian Open with partner Svetlana Kuznetsova. She reached the top ten of the WTA rankings for the first time in early 2005 following her first Grand Slam quarterfinal singles appearance, at the Australian Open, where she lost 7–9 in the final set to Lindsay Davenport.

Molik won the bronze medal at the 2004 Summer Olympics in Athens in the singles competition, beating then world No. 3, Anastasia Myskina, in straight sets.

She won the Zurich Open, a Tier I tournament, defeating Maria Sharapova in a three-set final.

=== 2005: Rise to the top 10 ===
Molik began 2005 by partnering Mark Philippoussis in the Hopman Cup. She played in the Sydney International, defeating unseeded players the entire way through the tournament before taking the title over compatriot Samantha Stosur in the final, 6–7, 6–4, 7–5. Molik played in the Australian Open as the 10th seed. She defeated Anabel Medina Garrigues in the first round, Aiko Nakamura in the second round and Tatiana Panova in the third round to set up a meeting with eighth seed Venus Williams in the fourth round. Molik defeated Williams in straight sets 7–5, 7–6 to become the first Australian woman to reach the Australian Open quarterfinals since 1988. Molik played in her first ever Grand Slam quarterfinal against top seed Lindsay Davenport. Davenport defeated Molik in a marathon three-set match, 6–4, 4–6, 9–7. Molik won her first Grand Slam doubles title with Svetlana Kuznetsova. After the Australian Open, Molik rose into the top 10 in singles for the first time in her career, at No. 10.

Molik played in the Proximus Diamond Games in Antwerp, making the semifinals before losing to Amélie Mauresmo 6–3, 7–6. However, she defeated Mauresmo in the Tier II Qatar Ladies Open semifinals 7–6, 6–1 to set up a meeting with second seed Maria Sharapova. Sharapova defeated Molik in the final in three sets. Molik rose to No. 8 after the tournament.

As the seventh seed at the Tier I Indian Wells Open, Molik made the fourth round before losing to a returning Justine Henin in three sets. This was the second last time in 2005 that Molik won past the first round of a tournament.

After crashing out of the tournament in Amelia Island to Virginie Razzano, Molik took an extended break due to an inner ear infection, which caused her to miss the entire clay-court season including the French Open. Molik returned for the grass court season in Birmingham, however, lost in the second round after a first-round bye to Laura Granville. Molik took another long break, missing Wimbledon, due to the ear infection.

She played only one lead in tournament for the US Open, losing in the first round to Gisela Dulko 2–6, 4–6. Seeded 14th at the US Open, she lost in the first round to Shenay Perry also in straight sets. Molik won her last match of 2005 at the tournament in Bali as the third seed, making the second round before losing to Alona Bondarenko of Ukraine. Molik lost in the first round in her last four tournaments of the year, Beijing, Filderstadt, Moscow and Zurich. She finished the year ranked 29th, with a 17–14 record.

=== Ear infection ===
In late 2005, Molik was diagnosed with vestibular neuronitis, an inner-ear condition caused by a virus that affected her balance, vision and energy level. In October 2005, she announced that she would be taking an extended break through the 2006 season in order to recover. Molik could have been part of the team for Australia's Fed Cup group matches in April, but Australian Davis Cup Captain, David Taylor announced that she would not be selected due to lack of match play and rustiness. Instead, rookie Casey Dellacqua took her place.

=== 2006: Return from illness ===
Molik made her return from the ear infection at the Italian Open in 2006, losing in the first round to Katarina Srebotnik 2–6, 0–6, and lost to Austrian Tamira Paszek in the first round in Istanbul in a three-setter. Molik won her first match since returning at the 2006 French Open, reaching the third round after defeating two relative unknowns and then losing to fourth-seeded Maria Sharapova 0–6, 5–7.

Molik played a Wimbledon warm-up in the Netherlands, losing in the first round to fifth seed Ana Ivanovic in three sets. At Wimbledon, she reached the second round by defeating Chan Yung-jan 7–6, 6–1, but lost to 21st seed Katarina Srebotnik, 2–6, 1–6.

Molik lost in the first round of Stockholm, Montreal and New Haven. She had high hopes for the US Open, but was shocked 6–3, 6–2 in the first round by the 17-year-old Vania King. She gained revenge over King in the first round of the Guangzhou Open, reaching the quarterfinals after also scoring an upset victory over a top 50 player, Lourdes Domínguez Lino, and lost to top seed Jelena Janković, 3–6, 5–7. After these wins Molik broke back into the top 200 at 179 and played in Tokyo where she defeated Jelena Kostanić, before losing in the second round to Jamea Jackson in two sets. Molik suffered first round defeats in Bangkok, losing again to Vania King 1–6, 5–7, and Zürich, losing to Shahar Pe'er 1–6, 2–6. Molik finished the year by losing in the first round of qualifying at the Generali Ladies Linz to Yaroslava Shvedova.

=== 2007: Comeback gains momentum ===
Molik won a wildcard into the Australian Open by winning the Australian Open Wildcard Play-offs, where she defeated 16-year-old Australian Jessica Moore in the final. In preparation for the Australian Open, Molik competed in the Hopman Cup in Perth and scored victories over world No. 6, Nadia Petrova, and Ashley Harkleroad. Her final Australian Open warm up tournament was the Hobart International where she reached the quarterfinals, beating two higher ranked opponents on her way before losing to doubles partner Sania Mirza. Molik also reached the doubles quarterfinals in Hobart with Mirza, before losing a close match to the No. 2 seeds.

During the Australian Open, Alicia Molik won through her first- and second-round matches against rising Chinese Taipei's Chan Yung-jan, and Estonian Kaia Kanepi, before losing a three-setter against the eighth seed Patty Schnyder of Switzerland. With her impressive third-round performance, Molik improved her then-141 ranking to inside the top 100, the first time since withdrawing from numerous tournaments due to that ear infection.

After the Australian Open, Molik reached the second round in Pattya, Bangalore, Dubai and Doha, before playing in Indian Wells where she reached the third round, losing to tenth seed Ana Ivanovic 2–6, 1–6. Molik had three consecutive first-round losses, in Miami, Amelia Island and Charleston. She finally won a match in the clay season, in Strasbourg, before losing to Anabel Medina Garrigues. Molik competed in the French Open, losing in the first round to 9th seed Anna Chakvetadze 2–6, 3–6. However, Molik teamed with Mara Santangelo to win her second Grand Slam doubles title at the French Open.

Molik played in two Wimbledon warm up tournaments, reaching the second round in Birmingham, however, lost in the first round in Eastbourne to Melanie South in three sets. Molik was able to rebound, and easily won her first round match at Wimbledon defeating Anastasia Rodionova, before losing in the second round to Serena Williams 6–7, 3–6. Molik and Santangelo, the sixth seeds in the doubles tournament, made it to the semifinals before losing to eventual champions Cara Black and Liezel Huber. Also competing in the mixed doubles, Molik and partner Jonas Björkman made the final, before losing to Jelena Janković and Jamie Murray.

Molik lost in the first round of two lead-in US Open tournaments, in Forest Hills and New Haven, before then falling in the first round at the US Open to Katarina Srebotnik. After the Open, Molik reached the quarterfinals in Guangzhou, losing to Dominika Cibulková, and at the Japan Open in Tokyo, losing to Venus Williams 6–7, 3–6. Losses followed in the first round of the Kremlin Cup, and in qualifying at Zurich, before Molik qualified for the Ladies Linz, reaching the main-draw second round where she lost to sixth seed Patty Schnyder.

Molik finished the year ranked 60 in the world, with a 25–24 singles record.

=== 2008: Retirement ===
In 2008, she entered the Perth Hopman Cup where she defeated Lucie Šafářová in the first round of the round-robin competition, before losing to Sania Mirza and Serena Williams in ties involving India and the United States respectively. Her second competition of 2008 was the Sydney International where she again faced Šafářová, to whom she lost in straight sets. Molik won her opening round at the Australian Open against Kaia Kanepi, before falling to 18-year-old Czech sensation Nicole Vaidišová, 2–6, 3–6.

Molik's singles ranking continued to fall due to an elbow problem. Molik lost in the first round of singles qualifying at the French Open and Wimbledon in 2008, and did not win a main-draw match after January 2008. Molik has enjoyed erratic results in doubles, where she partnered Sun Tiantian and defeated Cara Black and Liezel Huber who were the top-seeds at the tournament in Sydney. She partnered Mara Santangelo at Wimbledon and the French Open, but fell in the first round of competition. Molik received a wildcard into the Beijing Olympics which she stated was "the best news I've had since 2004." Representing Australia alongside fellow countrywomen Sam Stosur and Casey Dellacqua, Molik was ousted in the first round by María José Martínez Sánchez 6–2, 6–2.

On 5 September, Molik announced her retirement from professional tennis, after experiencing nagging leg and elbow problems.

She worked for six months as a commentator before announcing her comeback.

=== 2009: Comeback ===
On 30 July 2009, Molik announced that she planned to embark on a comeback to tour tennis, claiming to be free of injury. Her first comeback tournament was in the New Haven doubles event. She entered the women's doubles at the Pilot Pen Tennis event as a wildcard with Meghann Shaughnessy, losing to the Spanish duo of María José Martínez Sánchez and Nuria Llagostera Vives.

Molik lost her first-round doubles match with Shaughnessy at the US Open against Līga Dekmeijere and Julie Ditty 6–7^{(4)}, 1–6.

In September 2009, Molik entered a $25k tournament in Darwin, which she won in both singles and doubles. Molik won the doubles with compatriot Casey Dellacqua (who is also on a comeback trail) and won the singles over rising star Monika Wejnert 3–6, 6–3, 6–1. Molik backed up with a win at the Bendigo ITF event. She won another ITF event in Mildura, and reached the semifinals of another ITF event in Perth. Molik then made it through to the Australian Open wildcard playoff quarterfinals after winning three out of three round-robin matches, however, suffered a shock loss to teenager Jessica Moore.

=== 2010: Return to tour level tennis and final retirement ===
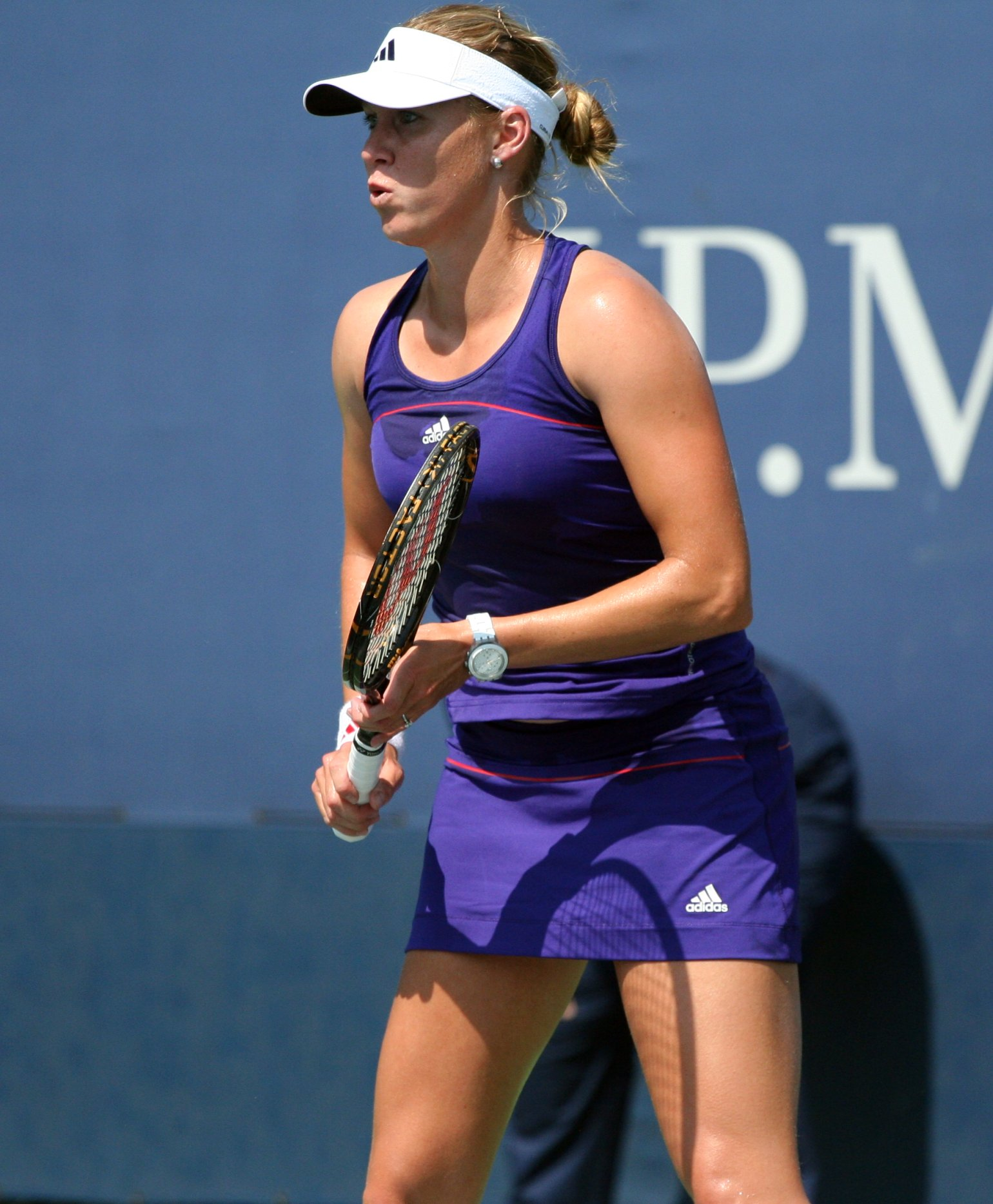
Alicia Molik at the 2010 US Open

After great success during the last three months of the 2009 season in ITF tournaments, Molik started 2010 ranked back inside the top 200.

Molik started her 2010 campaign at the Brisbane International where she defeated Ekaterina Makarova in the first round in three sets. In the second round, Molik was made to rethink her comeback on the WTA Tour, losing to eventual champion Kim Clijsters 0–6, 3–6. After the disappointing loss, she played the Hobart International. In her first-round match, she defeated her former doubles partner Sania Mirza in three sets. But just like her results at Brisbane, she lost in a much tighter second round 6–7, 6–3, 3–6 to Carla Suárez Navarro. Needing more matches under her belt, Molik decided to play with compatriot Jelena Dokić in the doubles event at the same tournament. However, they lost in a very tight first round match 6–7, 7–6, [2–10].

Molik took part in both singles and doubles at the Australian Open with Meghann Shaughnessy. In singles, Molik lead 6–3, 5–2 before she lost to Julie Coin 6–3, 6–7, 3–6.

Molik played in Australia's Fed Cup World Group II tie against Spain, however, she lost heavily in the reverse singles to Suárez Navarro 1–6, 1–6. Molik played in Dubai, where she defeated Australian Open semifinalist and 16th seed Zheng Jie in the first round, and then lost to fellow qualifier Anna-Lena Grönefeld in straight sets. She lost in the first round of the Malaysian Open to Alisa Kleybanova, 1–6, 4–6.

Molik accepted a wildcard into the Premier Mandatory event at Indian Wells. In the first round, she defeated Tatjana Malek 6–3, 6–1, and then pulled off an upset by defeating the 29th seed Anabel Medina Garrigues 6–4, 5–7, 7–6. Molik played Elena Baltacha in the third round, dominating the match with a 6–0, 6–2 victory. She lost to Zheng Jie in the fourth round. In the first round of the Miami Open, Molik defeated Ashley Harkleroad in her comeback match 6–1, 6–1 in 45 minutes. In doubles, she partnered with the 2009 Miami doubles champion, Svetlana Kuznetsova. Molik lost in the first round of the 2010 French Open to Janković, 0–6, 4–6.

Molik is the current captain for the Cottesloe Tennis Club Women's State League team, participating in the Tennis West Women's State League. In 2025, she led her team to a grand final, where they were defeated by Hensman Park Tennis Club. She won the leagues Most Valuable Player award for both the 2023/24 and 2024/25 seasons.

== Media career ==
Molik began working in tennis broadcasting in 2006, joining the Nine Network as a commentator for major tournaments, including the Australian Open and Wimbledon. Her expert analysis has remained a regular feature of the network's coverage.

After retiring from professional tennis in 2011, she expanded her media work across sports programming while continuing to appear in Nine's tennis broadcasts.

In February 2026, Molik joined Nine News Perth as weekend sports presenter. Her role includes presenting major sports stories, covering local and national events, and contributing to Nine's wider sports reporting.

Her decade as captain of Australia's Billie Jean King Cup team also involved frequent media duties, further establishing her profile as a commentator and analyst.

== Personal life ==
Molik was an Australian Institute of Sport scholarship holder. She married Tim Sullivan in February 2011 and gave birth to their first child, a son, in 2012.

== Significant finals ==
=== Grand Slam tournaments ===
==== Doubles: 2 (2 titles) ====
Result	Year	Championship	Surface!	Partner	Opponents	Score
Win	2005	Australian Open	Hard	(Russia) Svetlana Kuznetsova	(United States) Lindsay Davenport (United States) Corina Morariu	6–3, 6–4
Win	2007	French Open	Clay	(Italy) Mara Santangelo	(Slovenia) Katarina Srebotnik (Japan) Ai Sugiyama	7–6^{(7–5)}, 6–4

==== Mixed doubles: 3 (3 runner-ups) ====
Result	Year	Championship	Surface!	Partner	Opponents	Score
Loss	2004	Wimbledon	Grass	(Australia) Todd Woodbridge	(Zimbabwe) Cara Black (Zimbabwe) Wayne Black	6–3, 6–7^{(8–10)}, 4–6
Loss	2004	US Open	Hard	(Australia) Todd Woodbridge	(Russia) Vera Zvonareva (United States) Bob Bryan	3–6, 4–6
Loss	2007	Wimbledon	Grass	(Sweden) Jonas Björkman	(Serbia) Jelena Janković (United Kingdom) Jamie Murray	4–6, 6–3, 1–6

=== WTA Tier I tournaments ===
==== Singles: 1 (title) ====
Result	Year	Tournament	Surface	Opponent	Score
Win	2004	Zurich Open	Hard (i)	(Russia) Maria Sharapova	4–6, 6–2, 6–3

==== Doubles: 1 (title) ====
Result	Year	Tournament	Surface	Partner	Opponents	Score
Win	2005	Miami Open	Hard	(Russia) Svetlana Kuznetsova	(United States) Lisa Raymond (Australia) Rennae Stubbs	7–5, 6–7^{(5–7)}, 6–2

== WTA Tour finals ==
=== Singles: 9 (5 titles, 4 runner-ups) ===
Legend
Grand Slam tournaments
Year-end championships
Tier I
Tier II
Tier III
Tier IV
Tier V

Result	W/L	Date	Tournament	Tier	Surface	Opponent	Score
Win	1–0	Jan 2003	Hobart, Australia	Tier V	Hard	(United States) Amy Frazier	6–2, 4–6, 6–4
Loss	1–1	Apr 2003	Sarasota, US	Tier IV	Clay	(Australia) Anastasia Myskina	4–6, 1–6
Loss	1–2	Apr 2003	Budapest, Hungary	Tier V	Clay	(Spain) Magüi Serna	6–3, 5–7, 4–6
Loss	1–3	May 2004	Vienna, Austria	Tier III	Clay	(Israel) Anna Smashnova	2–6, 6–3, 2–6
Win	2–3	Aug 2004	Stockholm, Sweden	Tier IV	Hard	(Ukraine) Tatiana Perebiynis	6–1, 6–1
Win	3–3	Oct 2004	Zurich, Switzerland	Tier I	Hard (i)	(Russia) Maria Sharapova	4–6, 6–2, 6–3
Win	4–3	Oct 2004	Luxembourg	Tier III	Hard (i)	(Russia) Dinara Safina	6–3, 6–4
Win	5–3	Jan 2005	Sydney, Australia	Tier II	Hard	(Australia) Samantha Stosur	6–7^{(5–7)}, 6–4, 7–5
Loss	5–4	Feb 2005	Doha, Qatar	Tier II	Hard	(Russia) Maria Sharapova	6–4, 1–6, 4–6

=== Doubles: 16 (7 titles, 9 runner-ups) ===
Result	W/L	Date	Tournament	Tier	Surface	Partner	Opponents	Score
Loss	0–1	Jan 2000	Hobart, Australia	Tier IVb	Hard	(Belgium) Kim Clijsters	(Italy) Rita Grande (France) Émilie Loit	2–6, 6–2, 3–6
Loss	0–2	Jun 2003	Birmingham, UK	Tier III	Grass	(United States) Martina Navratilova	(Belgium) Els Callens (United States) Meilen Tu	5–7, 4–6
Loss	0–3	Aug 2003	New Haven, US	Tier II	Hard	(Spain) Magüi Serna	(Spain) Virginia Ruano Pascual (Argentina) Paola Suárez	6–7^{(6–8)}, 3–6
Loss	0–4	Apr 2004	Amelia Island, US	Tier II	Clay	(Switzerland) Myriam Casanova	(Russia) Nadia Petrova (United States) Meghann Shaughnessy	6–3, 2–6, 5–7
Win	1–4	Jun 2004	Eastbourne, UK	Tier II	Grass	(Spain) Magüi Serna	(Russia) Svetlana Kuznetsova (Russia) Elena Likhovtseva	6–4, 6–4
Win	2–4	Aug 2004	Stockholm, Sweden	Tier IV	Hard	(Austria) Barbara Schett	(Switzerland) Emmanuelle Gagliardi (Germany) Anna-Lena Grönefeld	6–3, 6–3
Win	3–4	Nov 2004	Philadelphia, US	Tier II	Hard (i)	(United States) Lisa Raymond	(South Africa) Liezel Huber (United States) Corina Morariu	7–5, 6–4
Win	4–4	Jan 2005	Australian Open	GS	Hard	(Russia) Svetlana Kuznetsova	(United States) Lindsay Davenport (United States) Corina Morariu	6–3, 6–4
Win	5–4	Feb 2005	Doha, Qatar	Tier II	Hard	(Italy) Francesca Schiavone	(Zimbabwe) Cara Black (South Africa) Liezel Huber	6–3, 6–4
Loss	5–5	Feb 2005	Dubai, UAE	Tier II	Hard	(Russia) Svetlana Kuznetsova	(Spain) Virginia Ruano Pascual (Argentina) Paola Suárez	7–6, 2–6, 1–6
Win	6–5	Mar 2005	Miami, US	Tier I	Hard	(Russia) Svetlana Kuznetsova	(United States) Lisa Raymond (Australia) Rennae Stubbs	7–5, 6–7^{(5–7)}, 6–2
Loss	6–6	May 2006	Istanbul, Turkey	Tier III	Clay	(India) Sania Mirza	(Ukraine) Alona Bondarenko (Belarus) Anastasiya Yakimova	2–6, 4–6
Loss	6–7	Feb 2007	Dubai, UAE	Tier II	Hard	(Russia) Svetlana Kuznetsova	(Zimbabwe) Cara Black (United States) Liezel Huber	6–7, 4–6
Loss	6–8	May 2007	Strasbourg, France	Tier III	Clay	(China) Sun Tiantian	(China) Zheng Jie (China) Yan Zi	3–6, 4–6
Win	7–8	May 2007	French Open	GS	Clay	(Italy) Mara Santangelo	(Slovenia) Katarina Srebotnik (Japan) Ai Sugiyama	7–6^{(7–5)}, 6–4
Loss	7–9	Aug 2007	Los Angeles, US	Tier II	Hard	(Italy) Mara Santangelo	(Czech Republic) Květa Peschke (Australia) Rennae Stubbs	0–6, 1–6

== Olympics ==
=== Singles: 1 (bronze medal) ===
Result	Year	Location	Surface	Opponent	Score
Bronze	2004	Athens	Hard	(Russia) Anastasia Myskina	6–3, 6–4

== Performance timelines ==
Key
W	F	SF	QF	#R	RR	Q#	P#	DNQ	A	Z#	PO	G	S	B	NMS	NTI	P	NH

(W) winner; (F) finalist; (SF) semifinalist; (QF) quarterfinalist; (#R) rounds 4, 3, 2, 1; (RR) round-robin stage; (Q#) qualification round; (P#) preliminary round; (DNQ) did not qualify; (A) absent; (Z#) Davis/Fed Cup Zonal Group (with number indication) or (PO) play-off; (G) gold, (S) silver or (B) bronze Olympic/Paralympic medal; (NMS) not a Masters tournament; (NTI) not a Tier I tournament; (P) postponed; (NH) not held; (SR) strike rate (events won / competed); (W–L) win–loss record.

=== Singles ===
Tournament	1998	1999	2000	2001	2002	2003	2004	2005	2006	2007	2008	2009	2010	2011	Career W/L
Grand Slam tournaments
Australian Open	Q2	1R	3R	1R	1R	1R	4R	QF	A	3R	2R	A	1R	2R	13–11
French Open	A	3R	1R	1R	1R	1R	1R	A	3R	1R	Q1	A	1R	A	4–9
Wimbledon	A	1R	2R	2R	1R	3R	3R	A	2R	2R	Q1	A	2R	A	9–9
US Open	A	1R	2R	3R	2R	3R	2R	1R	1R	1R	A	A	1R	A	7–10
Grand Slam Win–loss	0–0	2–4	4–4	3–4	1–4	4–4	6–4	4–2	3–3	3–4	1–1	0–0	1–4	1–1	33–39
Year-end championships
WTA Tour Championships	A	A	A	A	A	A	A	A	A	A	A	A	A	A	0–0
Olympic Games
Summer Olympics	Not Held		1R	Not Held			SF-B	Not Held			1R	Not Held			5–3
Career statistics
Year-end ranking	172	94	115	47	100	35	13	29	163	58	311	309	110	317	

=== Doubles ===
Tournament	1998	1999	2000	2001	2002	2003	2004	2005	2006	2007	2008	2009	2010	2011	Career W/L
Grand Slam tournaments
Australian Open	1R	1R	2R	2R	3R	A	A	W	A	1R	3R	A	1R	2R	13–9
French Open	A	2R	1R	1R	3R	QF	1R	A	1R	W	1R	A	1R	A	12–9
Wimbledon	A	3R	3R	1R	1R	2R	2R	1R	A	SF	1R	A	1R	A	10–10
US Open	A	2R	1R	3R	1R	1R	1R	QF	A	3R	A	1R	1R	A	8–10
Grand Slam Win–loss	0–1	4–4	3–4	3–4	4–4	4–3	1–3	9–2	0–1	13–3	2–2	0–1	0–4	1–1	43–38

== See also ==
- List of female tennis players
