= National colours of Israel =

The modern flag of Israel, horizontal blue stripes on white background with blue colour Star of David in center of the flag.

The national colours of Israel are azure and white as seen on the flag of Israel.

== History ==
Blue and white are perceived as patriotic colours in the State of Israel and the Jewish world. Blue and white are used in flags, symbols, etc. Eg: Blue-White (Blau-Weiss) Zionist youth moment in Germany and Blue and white (He) patriotic song. Book of Numbers mentions in 15:38, it states that the Israelites were commanded to put fringes on the corners of their garments, and to put a cord of blue border upon these fringes.

== See also ==
- Blue and White (political alliance)
- Blue in Judaism
- National colours
- National symbols of Israel
