= Royal King's Park Tennis Club =

Heritage listed building in West Perth, Western Australia

Coordinates: 31.9537°S 115.8394°E

Royal Kings Park Tennis Club
- League: Tennis West State League
- Established: 1899
- Location: Kings Park, Western Australia
- President: Greg Jacobs
- Vice-president: Geoff Barker
- Championships: 10
- Website: www.rkptc.com.au

Royal Kings Park Tennis Club, founded in 1899, is located in Kings Park, Western Australia. It was originally called the Mount Tennis Club and included two asphalt courts. Later, lawn tennis, bowls and croquet facilities were added. It is the oldest tennis club in Western Australia.

The members' pavilion was built in 1926 and the McGibbon stand built in 1935. A new building opened in 2007 and includes social facilities as well as a gymnasium, squash courts and swimming pools.

The wrestling events of the 1962 British Empire and Commonwealth Games were held at the club, outdoors under floodlights, after the original plans to use the Drill Hall venue were rejected.

The club has seen numerous Davis Cup ties played there, most recently in 2004 when the Australian team of Lleyton Hewitt, Wayne Arthurs and Todd Woodbridge played Morocco in a world group qualifying match. The 1971 Federation Cup was held there. In November 2011 it was announced the club was in contention for a Switzerland-Australia Davis Cup tie.

As of 2025, the club features 22 grass courts, two synthetic and six hard courts. It is operated by Next Generation Australia, a health and fitness company.

== State League ==
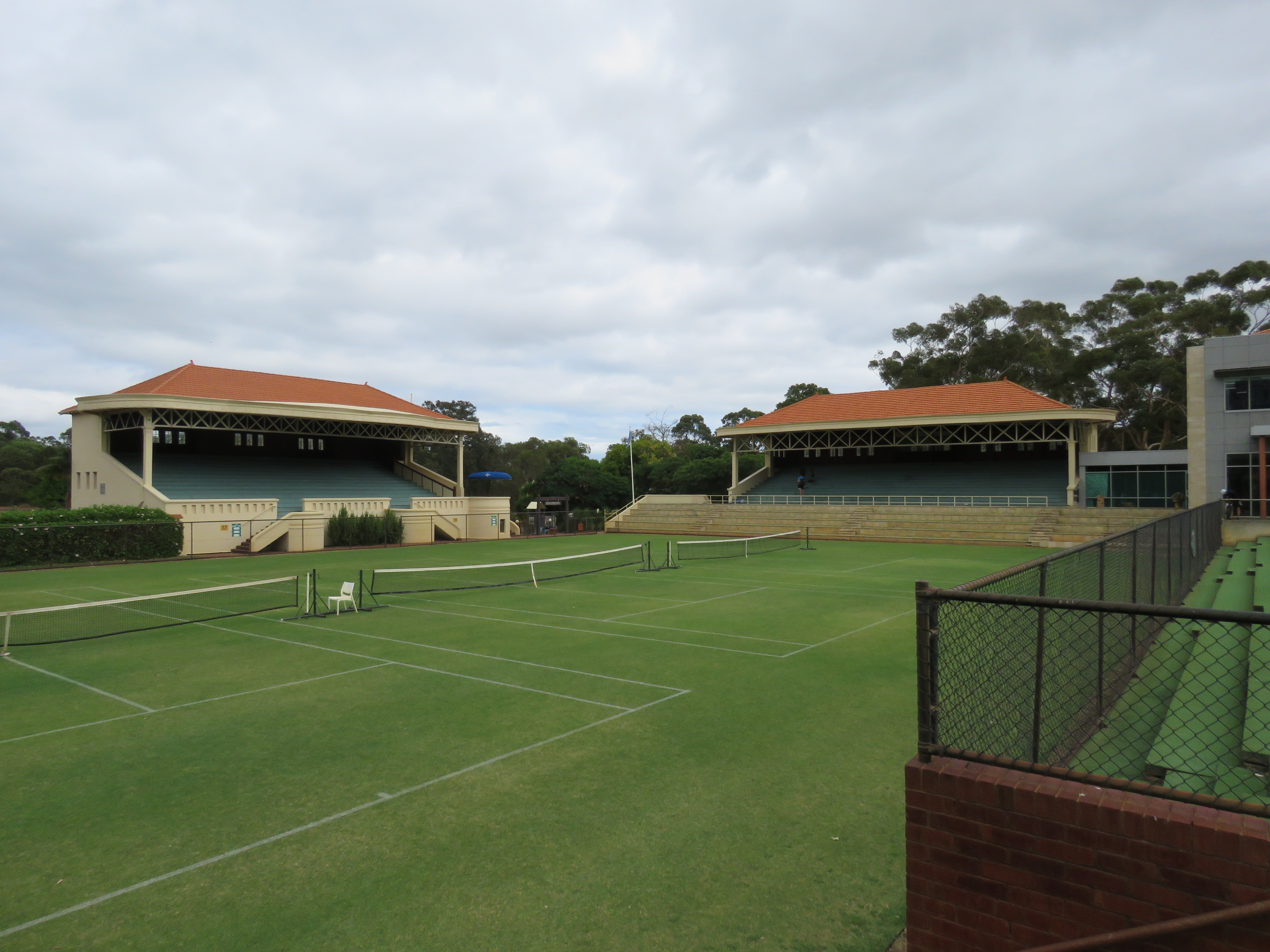
Courts at the club in 2022

The Royal Kings Park Tennis Club participates in the Tennis West State League, as they have for a number of years, winning 10 championships across the men's and women's competition. The club's most recent championship came in the 2018/19 women's competition.

Men's Championships: 1966/67, 1972/73, 1988/89.

Women's Championships: 1968/69, 1970/71, 1971/72, 1991/92, 1992/93, 2017/18, 2018/19.

== See also ==
- Davis Cup
- Kings Park
