= 2004 Nordea Nordic Light Open =

- Date: 2–8 August
- Edition: 3rd
- Category: Tier IV
- Draw: 32S / 16D
- Prize money: $140,000
- Surface: Hard / outdoor
- Location: Stockholm, Sweden

Champions

Singles
- (Australia) Alicia Molik

Doubles
- (Australia) Alicia Molik / (Austria) Barbara Schett
← 2003 ·	Nordic Light Open	· 2005 →

The 2004 Nordea Nordic Light Open was a women's tennis tournament played on outdoor hard courts that was part of the Tier IV category of the 2004 WTA Tour. It was the third edition of the tournament and took place in Stockholm, Sweden from 2 August until 8 August 2004. Third-seeded Alicia Molik won the singles title and earned $22,000 first-prize money.

== Finals ==
=== Singles ===
(Australia) Alicia Molik defeated (Ukraine) Tatiana Perebiynis, 6–1, 6–1

- It was Molik's 1st singles title of the year and the 2nd of her career.

=== Doubles ===
(Australia) Alicia Molik / (Austria) Barbara Schett defeated (Switzerland) Emmanuelle Gagliardi / (Germany) Anna-Lena Grönefeld, 6–3, 6–3
