= 2001 Kremlin Cup – Women's doubles =

Women's doubles
- 2001 Kremlin Cup

Final
- Champions: (Switzerland) Martina Hingis (Russia) Anna Kournikova
- Runners-up: (Russia) Elena Dementieva (Russia) Lina Krasnoroutskaya
- Score: 7–6^{(7–1)}, 6–3

Details
- Seeds: 4

Events
Singles	men	women
Doubles	men	women
← 2000 ·	Kremlin Cup	· 2002 →

Martina Hingis and Anna Kournikova defeated Elena Dementieva and Lina Krasnoroutskaya in the final, 7–6^{(7–1)}, 6–3 to win the women's singles doubles title at the 2001 Kremlin Cup.

Julie Halard-Decugis and Ai Sugiyama were the defending champions, but chose not to participate.

== Seeds ==
1. (Zimbabwe) Cara Black / (Russia) Elena Likhovtseva (first round)
2. (Switzerland) Martina Hingis / (Russia) Anna Kournikova (champions)
3. (Italy) Silvia Farina Elia / (Austria) Barbara Schett (semifinals)
4. (Slovakia) Karina Habšudová / (Ukraine) Elena Tatarkova (first round)

== Draw ==
=== Key ===
- Q = Qualifier
- WC = Wild card
- LL = Lucky loser
- Alt = Alternate
- SE = Special exempt
- PR = Protected ranking
- ITF = ITF entry
- JE = Junior exempt
- w/o = Walkover
- r = Retired
- d = Defaulted
- SR = Special ranking

=== Draw ===
First round
1	(Zimbabwe) C Black (Russia) E Likhovtseva	2	3
Q	(Russia) A Myskina (Russia) T Panova	6	6
(Sweden) Å Carlsson (Belgium) L Courtois	6^{3}	3
(Russia) E Dementieva (Russia) L Krasnoroutskaya	7	6
4	(Slovakia) K Habšudová (Ukraine) E Tatarkova	3	0
WC	(Russia) G Fokina (Russia) S Kuznetsova	6	6
(Czech Republic) D Bedáňová (United States) A Stevenson	2	2
(Argentina) L Montalvo (Spain) M Serna	6	6
(Germany) A Glass (Austria) S Plischke	0	3
(South Africa) N de Villiers (Kazakhstan) I Selyutina	6	6
(France) V Razzano (Federal Republic of Yugoslavia) D Zarić	4	1
3	(Italy) S Farina Elia (Austria) B Schett	6	6
(Italy) F Schiavone (Spain) C Torrens Valero	6	6^{4}	6
(Germany) A Barna (Russia) E Kulikovskaya	4	7	4
(Czech Republic) K Koukalová (Czech Republic) A Vašková	0	3
2	(Switzerland) M Hingis (Russia) A Kournikova	6	6

Quarterfinals
Q	(Russia) A Myskina (Russia) T Panova	4	6	2
(Russia) E Dementieva (Russia) L Krasnoroutskaya	6	4	6
WC	(Russia) G Fokina (Russia) S Kuznetsova	6^{5}	3
(Argentina) L Montalvo (Spain) M Serna	7	6
(South Africa) N de Villiers (Kazakhstan) I Selyutina	6	4	3
3	(Italy) S Farina Elia (Austria) B Schett	3	6	6
(Italy) F Schiavone (Spain) C Torrens Valero	1	2
2	(Switzerland) M Hingis (Russia) A Kournikova	6	6

Semifinals
(Russia) E Dementieva (Russia) L Krasnoroutskaya	6	6
(Argentina) L Montalvo (Spain) M Serna	2	2
3	(Italy) S Farina Elia (Austria) B Schett	1	1
2	(Switzerland) M Hingis (Russia) A Kournikova	6	6

Final
(Russia) E Dementieva (Russia) L Krasnoroutskaya	6^{1}	3
2	(Switzerland) M Hingis (Russia) A Kournikova	7	6
