= 2003 Nordea Nordic Light Open – Doubles =

Doubles
- 2003 Nordea Nordic Light Open

Final
- Champions: (Russia) Evgenia Kulikovskaya (Ukraine) Elena Tatarkova
- Runners-up: (Ukraine) Tatiana Perebiynis (Croatia) Silvija Talaja
- Score: 6–2, 6–4

Details
- Draw: 16 (1WC/1Q)
- Seeds: 4

Events
Singles	Doubles
← 2002 ·	Nordic Light Open	· 2004 →

Svetlana Kuznetsova and Arantxa Sánchez Vicario were the defending champions, but none competed this year. Kuznetsova chose to compete at Los Angeles during the same week, reaching the semifinals, while Sánchez Vicario retired from professional tennis at the end of the 2002 season.

Evgenia Kulikovskaya and Elena Tatarkova won the title by defeating Tatiana Perebiynis and Silvija Talaja 6–2, 6–4 in the final.

== Seeds ==
1. (Hungary) Petra Mandula / (Austria) Patricia Wartusch (quarterfinals, withdrew due to a left ankle sprain on Wartusch)
2. (Russia) Evgenia Kulikovskaya / (Ukraine) Elena Tatarkova (champions)
3. (Hungary) Katalin Marosi / (Czech Republic) Renata Voráčová (first round)
4. (Switzerland) Myriam Casanova / (Croatia) Jelena Kostanić (first round)

== Draw ==
=== Key ===
- Q = Qualifier
- WC = Wild card
- LL = Lucky loser
- Alt = Alternate
- ITF = ITF entry
- PR = Protected ranking
- SR = Special ranking
- SE = Special exempt
- JE = Junior exempt
- JR = Junior Accelerator Programme entrant
- CO = College Accelerator Programme entrant
- NG = Next Gen Accelerator Program entrant
- w/o = Walkover
- r = Retired
- d = Defaulted

=== Draw ===
First round
1	(Hungary) P Mandula (Austria) P Wartusch	4	7^{7}	6
(Argentina) C Fernández (Spain) MJ Martínez Sánchez	6	6^{5}	4
(Ukraine) T Perebiynis (Croatia) S Talaja	6	6
(Russia) G Fattakhetdinova (Belarus) T Poutchek	3	4
3	(Hungary) K Marosi (Czech Republic) R Voráčová	1	7^{7}	5
Q	(Czech Republic) D Chládková (Czech Republic) Z Ondrášková	6	6^{2}	7
(Italy) L Dell'Angelo (Germany) V Henke	6	6
(Ukraine) A Bondarenko (Ukraine) V Bondarenko	1	2
WC	(Sweden) S Arvidsson (Finland) E Laine	6	6
(Germany) An Barna (Sweden) M Wolfbrandt	1	3
(France) C Dhenin (Spain) M Marrero	6	7
4	(Switzerland) M Casanova (Croatia) J Kostanić	2	5
(Republic of Ireland) K Liggan (Germany) C Schneider	3	6^{3}
(Czech Republic) I Benešová (Slovakia) Ľ Cervanová	6	7^{7}
(Australia) M Dittmann (Sweden) H Ejeson	2	4
2	(Russia) E Kulikovskaya (Ukraine) E Tatarkova	6	6

Quarterfinals
1	(Hungary) P Mandula (Austria) P Wartusch
(Ukraine) T Perebiynis (Croatia) S Talaja	w/o
Q	(Czech Republic) D Chládková (Czech Republic) Z Ondrášková	w/o
(Italy) L Dell'Angelo (Germany) V Henke
WC	(Sweden) S Arvidsson (Finland) E Laine	7^{7}	6^{5}	0
(France) C Dhenin (Spain) M Marrero	6^{5}	7^{7}	6
(Czech Republic) I Benešová (Slovakia) Ľ Cervanová	3	6	4
2	(Russia) E Kulikovskaya (Ukraine) E Tatarkova	6	4	6

Semifinals
(Ukraine) T Perebiynis (Croatia) S Talaja	6	6
Q	(Czech Republic) D Chládková (Czech Republic) Z Ondrášková	2	3
(France) C Dhenin (Spain) M Marrero	5	4
2	(Russia) E Kulikovskaya (Ukraine) E Tatarkova	7	6

Final
(Ukraine) T Perebiynis (Croatia) S Talaja	2	4
2	(Russia) E Kulikovskaya (Ukraine) E Tatarkova	6	6
