= 2003 Kremlin Cup – Men's singles =

Men's singles
- 2003 Kremlin Cup

Final
- Champion: (United States) Taylor Dent
- Runner-up: (Armenia) Sargis Sargsian
- Score: 7–6^{(7–5)}, 6–4

Details
- Draw: 32 (4 Q / 3 WC )
- Seeds: 8

Events
Singles	men	women
Doubles	men	women
← 2002 ·	Kremlin Cup	· 2004 →

Paul-Henri Mathieu was the defending champion but lost in the semifinals to Taylor Dent.

Dent won in the final 7–6^{(7–5)}, 6–4 against Sargis Sargsian.

== Seeds ==
1. (Netherlands) Sjeng Schalken (first round)
2. (Argentina) Agustín Calleri (quarterfinals)
3. (Spain) Félix Mantilla (first round)
4. (Russia) Marat Safin (first round)
5. (Belarus) Max Mirnyi (second round)
6. (Chile) Nicolás Massú (first round)
7. (Spain) Feliciano López (first round)
8. (Russia) Yevgeny Kafelnikov (second round)

== Draw ==
=== Key ===
- Q = Qualifier
- WC = Wild card
- LL = Lucky loser
- Alt = Alternate
- SE = Special exempt
- PR = Protected ranking
- ITF = ITF entry
- JE = Junior exempt
- w/o = Walkover
- r = Retired
- d = Defaulted
- SR = Special ranking

=== Finals ===
Semifinals
(France) Paul-Henri Mathieu	3	6	6^{1}
(United States) Taylor Dent	6	2	7^{7}
(United States) Vince Spadea	2	2
(Armenia) Sargis Sargsian	6	6

Final
(United States) Taylor Dent	7^{7}	6
(Armenia) Sargis Sargsian	6^{5}	4

=== Top half ===
First round
1	(Netherlands) S Schalken	3	1
(Russia) I Andreev	6	6
Q	(Czech Republic) T Zíb	2	4
(Croatia) I Ljubičić	6	6
Q	(Finland) T Ketola	6	6^{5}	7
(Argentina) JI Chela	4	7^{7}	5
(France) P-H Mathieu	6	6
7	(Spain) F López	1	4
3	(Spain) F Mantilla	2	0
(United States) T Dent	6	6
(Belgium) O Rochus	6	6
(Sweden) J Björkman	4	4
(Switzerland) M Rosset	6	6
Q	(Germany) D Prinosil	1	1
(Slovakia) K Kučera	6^{4}	6	6
6	(Chile) N Massú	7^{7}	2	2

Second round
(Russia) I Andreev	6	7^{9}
(Croatia) I Ljubičić	4	6^{7}
Q	(Finland) T Ketola	2	4
(France) P-H Mathieu	6	6
(United States) T Dent	6	2	6
(Belgium) O Rochus	4	6	4
(Switzerland) M Rosset	7	7^{8}
(Slovakia) K Kučera	5	6^{6}

Quarterfinals
(Russia) I Andreev	6	3	5
(France) P-H Mathieu	2	6	7
(United States) T Dent	6	6
(Switzerland) M Rosset	3	4

Semifinals
(France) P-H Mathieu	3	6	6^{1}
(United States) T Dent	6	2	7^{7}

=== Bottom half ===
First round
5	(Belarus) M Mirnyi	6	4	6
(Russia) N Davydenko	3	6	3
(Russia) M Youzhny	6^{4}	0
(Austria) S Koubek	7^{7}	6
WC	(Russia) A Stoliarov	6	4	4
(United States) V Spadea	1	6	6
Q	(Zimbabwe) W Black	6	6^{5}	6
4	(Russia) M Safin	4	7^{7}	4
8	(Russia) Y Kafelnikov	6	7^{13}
WC	(Russia) I Kunitsyn	0	6^{11}
(Armenia) S Sargsian	6	6
(Italy) F Volandri	1	2
(Finland) J Nieminen	6	4	2
(Georgia (country)) I Labadze	3	6	6
WC	(Russia) D Golovanov	2	2
2	(Argentina) A Calleri	6	6

Second round
5	(Belarus) M Mirnyi	3	6	6^{8}
(Austria) S Koubek	6	4	7^{10}
(United States) V Spadea	5	7	6
Q	(Zimbabwe) W Black	7	5	3
8	(Russia) Y Kafelnikov	4	6	4
(Armenia) S Sargsian	6	2	6
(Georgia (country)) I Labadze	4	6	1
2	(Argentina) A Calleri	6	3	6

Quarterfinals
(Austria) S Koubek	6	6^{2}	3
(United States) V Spadea	2	7^{7}	6
(Armenia) S Sargsian	6	6
2	(Argentina) A Calleri	3	4

Semifinals
(United States) V Spadea	2	2
(Armenia) S Sargsian	6	6

== Qualifying ==
=== Seeds ===
1. (Switzerland) ~~Marc Rosset~~ (moved into Main Draw)
2. (Czech Republic) Tomáš Zíb (qualified)
3. (Finland) Tuomas Ketola (qualified)
4. (Germany) David Prinosil (qualified)
5. (Czech Republic) Robin Vik (qualifying competition)
6. (Germany) Christian Vinck (qualifying competition)
7. (Russia) Dmitri Sitak (first round)
8. (Russia) Pavel Ivanov (second round)

=== Qualifiers ===
1. (Zimbabwe) Wayne Black
2. (Czech Republic) Tomáš Zíb
3. (Finland) Tuomas Ketola
4. (Germany) David Prinosil

=== Qualifying draw ===
==== First qualifier ====
First round
Alt	(Moldova) Andrei Gorban	2	2
(Zimbabwe) Wayne Black	6	6
WC	(Russia) Dmitri Lomakin	4	4
(Russia) Andrei Merinov	6	6
(Russia) Pavel Lobanov	4	2
(Russia) Alexandre Krasnoroutskiy	6	6
(Russia) Alexander Pavlioutchenkov	0	3
5	(Czech Republic) Robin Vik	6	6

Second round
(Zimbabwe) Wayne Black	6	6
(Russia) Andrei Merinov	1	2
(Russia) Alexandre Krasnoroutskiy	4	6^{1}
5	(Czech Republic) Robin Vik	6	7^{7}

Qualifying competition
(Zimbabwe) Wayne Black	6	3	6
5	(Czech Republic) Robin Vik	2	6	1

==== Second qualifier ====
First round
2	(Czech Republic) Tomáš Zíb	6	6
(Russia) Sergei Demekhine	3	4
(Russia) Nikolai Mishin	6	6^{5}	1
(Russia) Vadim Davletshin	2	7^{7}	6
(Russia) Alexei Ageev	0	1
(Russia) Andrei Cherkasov	6	6
(Russia) Alexander Sikanov	6	4	7^{7}
7	(Russia) Dmitri Sitak	2	6	6^{4}

Second round
2	(Czech Republic) Tomáš Zíb	7	6
(Russia) Vadim Davletshin	5	2
(Russia) Andrei Cherkasov	6	4	6
(Russia) Alexander Sikanov	2	6	4

Qualifying competition
2	(Czech Republic) Tomáš Zíb	6	6
(Russia) Andrei Cherkasov	2	4

==== Third qualifier ====
First round
3	(Finland) Tuomas Ketola	6	5	6
(Russia) Serguei Pozdnev	1	7	2
(Russia) Artem Sitak	6	7
(Russia) Mikhail Lifshits	3	5
(Russia) Mikhail Elgin	6	6
WC	(Russia) Armen Gomktsian	2	2
(Russia) Kirill Ivanov-Smolensky	5	5
8	(Russia) Pavel Ivanov	7	7

Second round
3	(Finland) Tuomas Ketola	6	6
(Russia) Artem Sitak	1	2
(Russia) Mikhail Elgin	7	6
8	(Russia) Pavel Ivanov	5	4

Qualifying competition
3	(Finland) Tuomas Ketola	4	6	6
(Russia) Mikhail Elgin	6	3	4

==== Fourth qualifier ====
First round
4	(Germany) David Prinosil	6	6
(Russia) Alexei Sergueev	1	2
WC	(Russia) Vladimir Melnikov	6	1	6
(Russia) Sergei Krotiouk	3	6	2
(Russia) Alexander Markin	6	6
(Russia) Mikhail Ledovskikh	3	2
WC	(Russia) Konstantin Kravchuk	4	1
6	(Germany) Christian Vinck	6	6

Second round
4	(Germany) David Prinosil	6	6
WC	(Russia) Vladimir Melnikov	1	3
(Russia) Alexander Markin	4	3
6	(Germany) Christian Vinck	6	6

Qualifying competition
4	(Germany) David Prinosil	2	6	7
6	(Germany) Christian Vinck	6	2	5
