= 2004 Nordea Nordic Light Open – Singles =

Singles
- 2004 Nordea Nordic Light Open

Final
- Champion: (Australia) Alicia Molik
- Runner-up: (Ukraine) Tatiana Perebiynis
- Score: 6–1, 6–1

Details
- Draw: 32 (2WC/4Q/1LL)
- Seeds: 8

Events
Singles	Doubles
← 2003 ·	Nordic Light Open	· 2005 →

Anna Smashnova-Pistolesi was the defending champion, but was forced to retire in her second round match against Sandra Kleinová due to a hamstring injury.

Alicia Molik won the title by defeating Tatiana Perebiynis 6–1, 6–1 in the final.

== Seeds ==
1. (Israel) Anna Smashnova-Pistolesi (second round, retired due to a hamstring injury)
2. (Italy) Silvia Farina Elia (semifinals)
3. (Australia) Alicia Molik (champion)
4. (Czech Republic) Iveta Benešová (first round)
5. (Czech Republic) Klára Koukalová (first round)
6. (Czech Republic) Denisa Chládková (quarterfinals)
7. (Italy) Flavia Pennetta (first round)
8. (Slovenia) Katarina Srebotnik (second round)

== Draw ==
=== Key ===
- Q = Qualifier
- WC = Wild card
- LL = Lucky loser
- Alt = Alternate
- ITF = ITF entry
- PR = Protected ranking
- SR = Special ranking
- SE = Special exempt
- JE = Junior exempt
- JR = Junior Accelerator Programme entrant
- CO = College Accelerator Programme entrant
- NG = Next Gen Accelerator Program entrant
- w/o = Walkover
- r = Retired
- d = Defaulted

=== Finals ===
Semifinals
(Czech Republic) Sandra Kleinová	5	3
(Ukraine) Tatiana Perebiynis	7	6
3	(Australia) Alicia Molik	7	6
2	(Italy) Silvia Farina Elia	5	3

Final
(Ukraine) Tatiana Perebiynis	1	1
3	(Australia) Alicia Molik	6	6

=== Top half ===
First round
1	(Israel) A Smashnova-Pistolesi	6	6
(Hungary) M Czink	2	1
(Czech Republic) S Kleinová	4	6	6
LL	(Germany) M Müller	6	0	3
(Zimbabwe) C Black	2	3
(Sweden) S Arvidsson	6	6
(Slovakia) H Nagyová	5	7^{7}	7^{10}
7	(Italy) F Pennetta	7	6^{1}	6^{8}
4	(Czech Republic) I Benešová	5	3
(Ukraine) T Perebiynis	7	6
Q	(Austria) P Wartusch	5	6	6
(France) S Cohen-Aloro	7	4	2
(Germany) AL Grönefeld	2	3
(Italy) ME Camerin	6	6
(Ukraine) J Vakulenko	3	0^{r}
8	(Slovenia) K Srebotnik	6	3

Second round
1	(Israel) A Smashnova-Pistolesi	0^{r}
(Czech Republic) S Kleinová	6
(Sweden) S Arvidsson	2	5
(Slovakia) H Nagyová	6	7
(Ukraine) T Perebiynis	6	6
Q	(Austria) P Wartusch	0	4
(Italy) ME Camerin	5	6	6
8	(Slovenia) K Srebotnik	7	3	3

Quarterfinals
(Czech Republic) S Kleinová	6	6
(Slovakia) H Nagyová	3	3
(Ukraine) T Perebiynis	7	6
(Italy) ME Camerin	5	4

Semifinals
(Czech Republic) S Kleinová	5	3
(Ukraine) T Perebiynis	7	6

=== Bottom half ===
First round
6	(Czech Republic) D Chládková	7	4	6
(Italy) R Vinci	5	6	3
WC	(Sweden) Å Svensson	1	4
(Italy) M Santangelo	6	6
Q	(Ukraine) E Tatarkova	6	2	4
(Croatia) S Talaja	2	6	6
WC	(Sweden) H Nooni	5	3
3	(Australia) A Molik	7	6
5	(Czech Republic) K Koukalová	2	6	6^{2}
(France) S Beltrame	6	4	7^{7}
(Slovakia) L Kurhajcová	3	6^{7}
(Austria) B Schett	6	7^{9}
Q	(Germany) J Schruff	6	6^{2}	6
(Switzerland) E Gagliardi	4	7^{7}	1
Q	(Russia) A Chakvetadze	6^{3}	6	3
2	(Italy) S Farina Elia	7^{7}	3	6

Second round
6	(Czech Republic) D Chládková	6	6
(Italy) M Santangelo	4	0
(Croatia) S Talaja	3	1
3	(Australia) A Molik	6	6
(France) S Beltrame	3	6	7
(Austria) B Schett	6	3	5
Q	(Germany) J Schruff	2	3
2	(Italy) S Farina Elia	6	6

Quarterfinals
6	(Czech Republic) D Chládková	3	2
3	(Australia) A Molik	6	6
(France) S Beltrame	6^{5}	3
2	(Italy) S Farina Elia	7^{7}	6

Semifinals
3	(Australia) A Molik	7	6
2	(Italy) S Farina Elia	5	3
