= 2002 Kremlin Cup =

- Date: 30 September – 6 October
- Edition: 13th (men) / 7th (women)
- Surface: Carpet / indoors
- Location: Moscow, Russia
- Venue: Olympic Stadium

Champions

Men's singles
- (France) Paul-Henri Mathieu

Women's singles
- (Bulgaria) Magdalena Maleeva

Men's doubles
- (Switzerland) Roger Federer / (Belarus) Max Mirnyi

Women's doubles
- (Russia) Elena Dementieva / (Slovakia) Janette Husárová
← 2001 ·	Kremlin Cup	· 2003 →

The 2002 Kremlin Cup was a tennis tournament played on indoor carpet courts at the Olympic Stadium in Moscow in Russia that was part of the International Series of the 2002 ATP Tour and of Tier I of the 2002 WTA Tour. The tournament ran from 30 September through 6 October 2002.

== Finals ==
=== Men's singles ===
(France) Paul-Henri Mathieu defeated (Netherlands) Sjeng Schalken 4–6, 6–2, 6–0

- It was Mathieu's 1st title of the year and the 1st of his career.

=== Women's singles ===
(Bulgaria) Magdalena Maleeva defeated (United States) Lindsay Davenport 5–7, 6–3, 7–6^{(7–4)}

- It was Maleeva's 2nd title of the year and the 10th of her career.

=== Men's doubles ===
(Switzerland) Roger Federer / (Belarus) Max Mirnyi defeated (Australia) Joshua Eagle / (Australia) Sandon Stolle 6–4, 7–6^{(7–0)}

- It was Federer's 3rd title of the year and the 4th of his career. It was Mirnyi's 3rd title of the year and the 13th of his career.

=== Women's doubles ===
(Russia) Elena Dementieva / (Slovakia) Janette Husárová defeated (Federal Republic of Yugoslavia) Jelena Dokić / (Russia) Nadia Petrova 2–6, 6–3, 7–6^{(7–0)}

- It was Dementieva's 3rd title of the year and the 3rd of her career. It was Husárová's 4th title of the year and the 12th of her career.
