= 2002 Kremlin Cup – Men's doubles =

Men's doubles
- 2002 Kremlin Cup

Final
- Champions: (Switzerland) Roger Federer (Belarus) Max Mirnyi
- Runners-up: (Australia) Joshua Eagle (Australia) Sandon Stolle
- Score: 6–4, 7–6^{(7–0)}

Details
- Draw: 16
- Seeds: 4

Events
Singles	men	women
Doubles	men	women
← 2001 ·	Kremlin Cup	· 2003 →

Max Mirnyi and Sandon Stolle were the defending champions but they competed with different partners that year, Mirnyi with Roger Federer and Stolle with Joshua Eagle.

Eagle and Stolle lost in the final 6–4, 7–6^{(7–0)} against Federer and Mirnyi.

== Seeds ==
1. (Sweden) Jonas Björkman / (Australia) Todd Woodbridge (quarterfinals)
2. (Russia) Yevgeny Kafelnikov / (United States) Jared Palmer (semifinals)
3. (Czech Republic) Martin Damm / (Czech Republic) Cyril Suk (first round)
4. (Australia) Joshua Eagle / (Australia) Sandon Stolle (final)

== Draw ==
=== Key ===
- Q = Qualifier
- WC = Wild card
- LL = Lucky loser
- Alt = Alternate
- SE = Special exempt
- PR = Protected ranking
- ITF = ITF entry
- JE = Junior exempt
- w/o = Walkover
- r = Retired
- d = Defaulted
- SR = Special ranking

First round
1	(Sweden) J Björkman (Australia) T Woodbridge	6	6
WC	(Russia) A Olhovskiy (Russia) A Stoliarov	1	2
WC	(Russia) D Golovanov (Russia) M Safin	6^{5}	6^{4}
(Argentina) G Etlis (United States) J Tarango	7^{7}	7^{7}
4	(Australia) J Eagle (Australia) S Stolle	6	7^{7}
(South Africa) W Ferreira (Federal Republic of Yugoslavia) N Zimonjić	3	6^{5}
(Spain) A Costa (Spain) T Robredo	3	4
(France) N Escudé (Germany) N Kiefer	6	6
(South Africa) R Koenig (Netherlands) S Schalken	6	6
(Czech Republic) J Novák (Germany) D Prinosil	4	2
(Switzerland) R Federer (Belarus) M Mirnyi	6	6
3	(Czech Republic) M Damm (Czech Republic) C Suk	3	4
(Croatia) I Ljubičić (Argentina) D Nalbandian	3	6^{4}
(Czech Republic) F Čermák (Czech Republic) L Friedl	6	7^{7}
WC	(Germany) R Schüttler (Russia) M Youzhny	6^{3}	3
2	(Russia) Y Kafelnikov (United States) J Palmer	7^{7}	6

Quarterfinals
1	(Sweden) J Björkman (Australia) T Woodbridge	2	6^{5}
(Argentina) G Etlis (United States) J Tarango	6	7^{7}
4	(Australia) J Eagle (Australia) S Stolle	0	6	6
(France) N Escudé (Germany) N Kiefer	6	4	4
(South Africa) R Koenig (Netherlands) S Schalken	3	4
(Switzerland) R Federer (Belarus) M Mirnyi	6	6
(Czech Republic) F Čermák (Czech Republic) L Friedl	1	6	2
2	(Russia) Y Kafelnikov (United States) J Palmer	6	2	6

Semifinals
(Argentina) G Etlis (United States) J Tarango	6^{5}	6	6^{5}
4	(Australia) J Eagle (Australia) S Stolle	7^{7}	3	7^{7}
(Switzerland) R Federer (Belarus) M Mirnyi	6	6
2	(Russia) Y Kafelnikov (United States) J Palmer	4	3

Final
4	(Australia) J Eagle (Australia) S Stolle	4	6^{0}
(Switzerland) R Federer (Belarus) M Mirnyi	6	7^{7}
