= 2001 Kremlin Cup – Men's doubles =

Men's doubles
- 2001 Kremlin Cup

Final
- Champions: (Belarus) Max Mirnyi (Australia) Sandon Stolle
- Runners-up: (India) Mahesh Bhupathi (United States) Jeff Tarango
- Score: 6–3, 6–0

Details
- Draw: 16
- Seeds: 4

Events
Singles	men	women
Doubles	men	women
← 2000 ·	Kremlin Cup	· 2002 →

Jonas Björkman and David Prinosil were the defending champions but only Prinosil competed that year with Martin Damm.

Damm and Prinosil lost in the quarterfinals to Donald Johnson and Jared Palmer.

Max Mirnyi and Sandon Stolle won in the final 6–3, 6–0 against Mahesh Bhupathi and Jeff Tarango.

== Seeds ==
1. (United States) Donald Johnson / (United States) Jared Palmer (semifinals)
2. (Czech Republic) Jiří Novák / (Czech Republic) David Rikl (semifinals)
3. (Zimbabwe) Wayne Black / (Zimbabwe) Kevin Ullyett (quarterfinals)
4. (Belarus) Max Mirnyi / (Australia) Sandon Stolle (champions)

== Draw ==
=== Key ===
- Q = Qualifier
- WC = Wild card
- LL = Lucky loser
- Alt = Alternate
- SE = Special exempt
- PR = Protected ranking
- ITF = ITF entry
- JE = Junior exempt
- w/o = Walkover
- r = Retired
- d = Defaulted
- SR = Special ranking

First round
1	(United States) D Johnson (United States) J Palmer	6	6
(Czech Republic) P Pála (Czech Republic) P Vízner	3	4
WC	(Russia) A Stoliarov (Belarus) V Voltchkov	2	6^{1}
(Czech Republic) M Damm (Germany) D Prinosil	6	7^{7}
WC/4	(Belarus) M Mirnyi (Australia) S Stolle	6	7^{7}
WC	(Switzerland) M Rosset (Russia) M Safin	4	6^{5}
(Australia) M Hill (The Bahamas) M Knowles	3	6	6
(Canada) D Nestor (Federal Republic of Yugoslavia) N Zimonjić	6	4	4
(Australia) J Eagle (Australia) A Florent	6	2	5
(India) M Bhupathi (United States) J Tarango	3	6	7
(South Africa) W Ferreira (Russia) Y Kafelnikov	6^{5}	7	3
3	(Zimbabwe) W Black (Zimbabwe) K Ullyett	7^{7}	5	6
(South Africa) D Adams (Argentina) M García	6	5	7^{7}
WC	(Russia) A Olhovskiy (Russia) M Youzhny	3	7	6^{3}
(United States) B Bryan (United States) M Bryan	4	4
2	(Czech Republic) J Novák (Czech Republic) D Rikl	6	6

Quarterfinals
1	(United States) D Johnson (United States) J Palmer	7	6
(Czech Republic) M Damm (Germany) D Prinosil	5	4
WC/4	(Belarus) M Mirnyi (Australia) S Stolle	6	6
(Australia) M Hill (The Bahamas) M Knowles	2	2
(India) M Bhupathi (United States) J Tarango	7^{7}	6
3	(Zimbabwe) W Black (Zimbabwe) K Ullyett	6^{5}	3
(South Africa) D Adams (Argentina) M García	5	7^{7}	3
2	(Czech Republic) J Novák (Czech Republic) D Rikl	7	6^{5}	6

Semifinals
1	(United States) D Johnson (United States) J Palmer	4	4
WC/4	(Belarus) M Mirnyi (Australia) S Stolle	6	6
(India) M Bhupathi (United States) J Tarango	6	6
2	(Czech Republic) J Novák (Czech Republic) D Rikl	3	4

Final
WC/4	(Belarus) M Mirnyi (Australia) S Stolle	6	6
(India) M Bhupathi (United States) J Tarango	3	0
