= 2003 Kremlin Cup =

- Date: 29 September 2003 – 5 October 2003
- Edition: 14th (men) / 8th (women)
- Location: Moscow, Russia
- Venue: Olympic Stadium

Champions

Men's singles
- (United States) Taylor Dent

Women's singles
- (Russia) Anastasia Myskina

Men's doubles
- (India) Mahesh Bhupathi / (Belarus) Max Mirnyi

Women's doubles
- (Russia) Nadia Petrova / (United States) Meghann Shaughnessy
← 2002 ·	Kremlin Cup	· 2004 →

The 2003 Kremlin Cup was a tennis tournament played on indoor carpet courts at the Olympic Stadium in Moscow in Russia that was part of the International Series of the 2003 ATP Tour and of Tier I of the 2003 WTA Tour. The tournament ran from 29 September through 5 October 2003.

== Finals ==
=== Men's singles ===
(United States) Taylor Dent defeated (Armenia) Sargis Sargsian 7–6^{(7–5)}, 6–4

- It was Dent's 3rd title of the year and the 4th of his career.

=== Women's singles ===
(Russia) Anastasia Myskina defeated (France) Amélie Mauresmo 6–2, 6–4

- It was Myskina's 4th title of the year and the 6th of her career.

=== Men's doubles ===
(India) Mahesh Bhupathi / (Belarus) Max Mirnyi defeated (Zimbabwe) Wayne Black / (Zimbabwe) Kevin Ullyett 6–3, 7–5

- It was Bhupathi's 4th title of the year and the 30th of his career. It was Mirnyi's 5th title of the year and the 18th of his career.

=== Women's doubles ===
(Russia) Nadia Petrova / (United States) Meghann Shaughnessy defeated (Russia) Anastasia Myskina / (Russia) Vera Zvonareva 6–3, 6–4

- It was Petrova's only title of the year and the 4th of her career. It was Shaughnessy's 1st title of the year and the 4th of her career.
