= 2003 Kremlin Cup – Women's doubles =

Women's doubles
- 2003 Kremlin Cup

Final
- Champions: (Russia) Nadia Petrova (United States) Meghann Shaughnessy
- Runners-up: (Russia) Anastasia Myskina (Russia) Vera Zvonareva
- Score: 6–3, 6–4

Details
- Seeds: 4

Events
Singles	men	women
Doubles	men	women
- Kremlin Cup

Defending champions Elena Dementieva and Janette Husárová did not compete together. Dementieva and Lina Krasnoroutskaya were third seed, but lost in the first round. Husárová and Patty Schnyder were unseeded; they lost in the second round to fourth seed Nadia Petrova and Meghann Shaughnessy. Petrova and Shaughnessy went on to reach the final, were they defeated the Russian wildcard team Anastasia Myskina and Vera Zvonareva (6–3, 6–4).

== Seeds ==
1. (Russia) Svetlana Kuznetsova / (United States) Martina Navratilova (semifinals)
2. (Zimbabwe) Cara Black / (Russia) Elena Likhovtseva (semifinals)
3. (Russia) Elena Dementieva / (Russia) Lina Krasnoroutskaya (first round)
4. (Russia) Nadia Petrova / (United States) Meghann Shaughnessy (champions)

== Draw ==
Key

- Q = Qualifier
- WC = Wild card
- LL = Lucky loser
- Alt = Alternate
- ITF = ITF entry
- PR = Protected ranking
- SR = Special ranking
- SE = Special exempt
- JE = Junior exempt
- JR = Junior Accelerator Programme entrant
- CO = College Accelerator Programme entrant
- NG = Next Gen Accelerator Program entrant
- w/o = Walkover
- r = Retired
- d = Defaulted

=== Draw ===
First round
1	(Russia) S Kuznetsova (United States) M Navratilova	6	6
(Canada) S Jeyaseelan (Bulgaria) M Maleeva	4	1
(Australia) A Molik (Spain) M Serna	3	6	6
(Belarus) T Poutchek (Czech Republic) R Voráčová	6	1	2
3	(Russia) E Dementieva (Russia) L Krasnoroutskaya	5	6	4
WC	(Russia) A Myskina (Russia) V Zvonareva	7	3	6
(Italy) S Farina Elia (Italy) F Schiavone	6	6
(Croatia) J Kostanić (Russia) E Kulikovskaya	4	3
(Greece) E Daniilidou (Venezuela) M Vento-Kabchi	2	r
(Slovakia) J Husárová (Switzerland) P Schnyder	2
Q	(Russia) M Kondratieva (Russia) E Kozhokina	2	1
4	(Russia) N Petrova (United States) M Shaughnessy	6	6
WC	(Russia) G Fattakhetdinova (Russia) G Fokina	2	7	7
(Slovenia) M Matevžič (Ukraine) T Perebiynis	6	6^{5}	6^{6}
(Federal Republic of Yugoslavia) J Dokić (Russia) D Safina	4	2
2	(Zimbabwe) C Black (Russia) E Likhovtseva	6	6

Quarterfinals
1	(Russia) S Kuznetsova (United States) M Navratilova	6	7
(Australia) A Molik (Spain) M Serna	4	5
WC	(Russia) A Myskina (Russia) V Zvonareva	6^{3}	6	7
(Italy) S Farina Elia (Italy) F Schiavone	7	1	5
(Slovakia) J Husárová (Switzerland) P Schnyder	2	6^{6}
4	(Russia) N Petrova (United States) M Shaughnessy	6	7
(Russia) G Fattakhetdinova (Russia) G Fokina	0	4
2	(Zimbabwe) C Black (Russia) E Likhovtseva	6	6

Semifinals
1	(Russia) S Kuznetsova (United States) M Navratilova	7	2	4
WC	(Russia) A Myskina (Russia) V Zvonareva	6^{8}	6	6
4	(Russia) N Petrova (United States) M Shaughnessy	6	6
2	(Zimbabwe) C Black (Russia) E Likhovtseva	3	0

Final
WC	(Russia) A Myskina (Russia) V Zvonareva	3	4
4	(Russia) N Petrova (United States) M Shaughnessy	6	6

== Qualifying ==
=== Seeds ===
1. (Czech Republic) Iveta Benešová / (Czech Republic) Michaela Paštiková (qualifying competition)
2. (Ukraine) Yuliana Fedak / (Russia) Anastasia Rodionova (first round)

=== Qualifiers ===
1. (Russia) Maria Kondratieva / (Russia) Ekaterina Kozhokina

=== Qualifying draw ===
First round
1	(Czech Republic) Iveta Benešová (Czech Republic) Michaela Paštiková	9
(Belarus) Nadejda Ostrovskaya (Russia) Galina Voskoboeva	7
WC	(Russia) Maria Kondratieva (Russia) Ekaterina Kozhokina	8
2	(Ukraine) Yuliana Fedak (Russia) Anastasia Rodionova	6

Qualifying competition
1	(Czech Republic) Iveta Benešová (Czech Republic) Michaela Paštiková	6	3	3
WC	(Russia) Maria Kondratieva (Russia) Ekaterina Kozhokina	2	6	6
