= 2001 Kremlin Cup – Men's singles =

Men's singles
- 2001 Kremlin Cup

Final
- Champion: (Russia) Yevgeny Kafelnikov
- Runner-up: (Germany) Nicolas Kiefer
- Score: 6–4, 7–5

Details
- Draw: 32 (4 Q / 3 WC )
- Seeds: 8

Events
Singles	men	women
Doubles	men	women
- Kremlin Cup

The 2001 Kremlin Cup men's singles was a professional tennis competition. Yevgeny Kafelnikov was the defending champion and won in the final 6–4, 7–5 against Nicolas Kiefer.

== Seeds ==
1. (Russia) Yevgeny Kafelnikov (champion)
2. (Russia) Marat Safin (second round)
3. (Switzerland) Roger Federer (first round)
4. (Germany) Tommy Haas (semifinals)
5. (Sweden) Thomas Johansson (quarterfinals)
6. (France) Fabrice Santoro (second round)
7. (Argentina) Guillermo Cañas (second round)
8. (France) Nicolas Escudé (first round)

== Draw ==
Key

- Q = Qualifier
- WC = Wild card
- LL = Lucky loser
- Alt = Alternate
- ITF = ITF entry
- PR = Protected ranking
- SR = Special ranking
- SE = Special exempt
- JE = Junior exempt
- JR = Junior Accelerator Programme entrant
- CO = College Accelerator Programme entrant
- NG = Next Gen Accelerator Program entrant
- w/o = Walkover
- r = Retired
- d = Defaulted

=== Finals ===
Semifinals
1	(Russia) Yevgeny Kafelnikov	6	6
4	(Germany) Tommy Haas	1	2
(Germany) Nicolas Kiefer	6	6
(Slovakia) Dominik Hrbatý	4	3

Final
1	(Russia) Yevgeny Kafelnikov	6	7
(Germany) Nicolas Kiefer	4	5

=== Top half ===
First round
1	(Russia) Y Kafelnikov	6	6
WC	(Russia) M Youzhny	3	3
LL	(France) A Dupuis	5	4
SE	(Argentina) D Nalbandian	7	6
WC	(Russia) A Stoliarov	7	6
(Czech Republic) M Tabara	5	3
(Italy) D Sanguinetti	2	3
5	(Sweden) T Johansson	6	6
4	(Germany) T Haas	6	6
Q	(United States) B Bryan	2	4
(Sweden) T Enqvist	6^{1}	7^{7}	6
(Italy) A Gaudenzi	7^{7}	6^{4}	1
(Argentina) F Squillari	4	5
(South Africa) W Ferreira	6	7
Q	(Sweden) M Gustafsson	6	5	6
8	(France) N Escudé	4	7	4

Second round
1	(Russia) Y Kafelnikov	6	7^{7}
SE	(Argentina) D Nalbandian	3	6^{4}
WC	(Russia) A Stoliarov	3	4
5	(Sweden) T Johansson	6	6
4	(Germany) T Haas	7	6
(Sweden) T Enqvist	5	2
(South Africa) W Ferreira	6^{4}	1
Q	(Sweden) M Gustafsson	7^{7}	6

Quarterfinals
1	(Russia) Y Kafelnikov	6	7
5	(Sweden) T Johansson	3	5
4	(Germany) T Haas	6	6
Q	(Sweden) M Gustafsson	1	4

Semifinals
1	(Russia) Y Kafelnikov	6	6
4	(Germany) T Haas	1	2

=== Bottom half ===
First round
6	(France) F Santoro	6	6
(Spain) G Blanco	2	1
Q	(Federal Republic of Yugoslavia) N Zimonjić	4	7^{7}	6^{11}
Q	(Switzerland) M Rosset	6	6^{4}	7^{13}
(France) J Boutter	5	3
(France) J Golmard	7	6
(Germany) N Kiefer	6	1	7^{7}
3	(Switzerland) R Federer	3	6	6^{4}
7	(Argentina) G Cañas	6	6
(Sweden) A Vinciguerra	0	1
(Czech Republic) B Ulihrach	1	0
(Czech Republic) J Novák	6	6
WC	(Belarus) V Voltchkov	4	5
(Slovakia) D Hrbatý	6	7
(Belarus) M Mirnyi	7	4	4
2	(Russia) M Safin	5	6	6

Second round
6	(France) F Santoro	2	4
Q	(Switzerland) M Rosset	6	6
(France) J Golmard	4	3
(Germany) N Kiefer	6	6
7	(Argentina) G Cañas	6^{6}	6^{1}
(Czech Republic) J Novák	7^{8}	7^{7}
(Slovakia) D Hrbatý	6	4	7^{7}
2	(Russia) M Safin	0	6	6^{5}

Quarterfinals
Q	(Switzerland) M Rosset	3	6^{1}
(Germany) N Kiefer	6	7^{7}
(Czech Republic) J Novák	7	4	3
(Slovakia) D Hrbatý	5	6	6

Semifinals
(Germany) N Kiefer	6	6
(Slovakia) D Hrbatý	4	3

== See also ==
- Association of Tennis Professionals
- History of tennis
