= Alicia Molik career statistics =

Tennis statistics of Alicia Molik

Career finals
Discipline	Type	Won	Lost	Total	WR
Singles	Grand Slam	–	–	–	–
Singles	Summer Olympics	–	–	–	–
Singles	WTA Finals (Note: Formerly known as: Virginia Slims Championships (until 1995); WTA Tour Championships (until 2014))	–	–	–	–
Singles	WTA 1000 (Note: Formerly known as: Category 4 & 5 & 6 (until 1990); Tier I (until 2009); WTA Premier Mandatory and 5 (until 2021))	1	0	1	1.00
Singles	WTA 500 (Note: Formerly known as: Category 3 (until 1990); Tier II (until 2009); WTA Premier (until 2021))	2	1	3	0.67
Singles	WTA 250 (Note: Formerly known as: Category 1 & 2 (until 1990); Tier III & IV & V (until 2009); WTA International (until 2021))	2	3	5	0.40
Singles	Total	5	4	9	0.56
Doubles	Grand Slam	2	0	2	1.00
Doubles	Summer Olympics	–	–	–	–
Doubles	WTA Finals	–	–	–	–
Doubles	WTA 1000	1	1	2	0.50
Doubles	WTA 500	3	4	7	0.43
Doubles	WTA 250	1	4	5	0.20
Doubles	Total	7	9	16	0.44
Mixed doubles	Grand Slam	0	3	3	0.00
Mixed doubles	Total	0	3	3	0.00
Total		12	16	28	0.43

This is a list of the main career statistics of professional Australian tennis player Alicia Molik. During her career, Molik won five WTA Tour singles titles and seven doubles titles. She achieved her career-high singles ranking of world No. 8 on February 28, 2005, following a Tier I title win at the 2004 Zurich Open and a quarterfinal run at the 2005 Australian Open. In doubles, she reached a career-high ranking of world No. 6 on June 6, 2005.

Molik is a two-time Grand Slam champion in women's doubles, winning the 2005 Australian Open with Svetlana Kuznetsova and the 2007 French Open with Mara Santangelo. She also won the bronze medal in women's singles at the 2004 Summer Olympics in Athens.

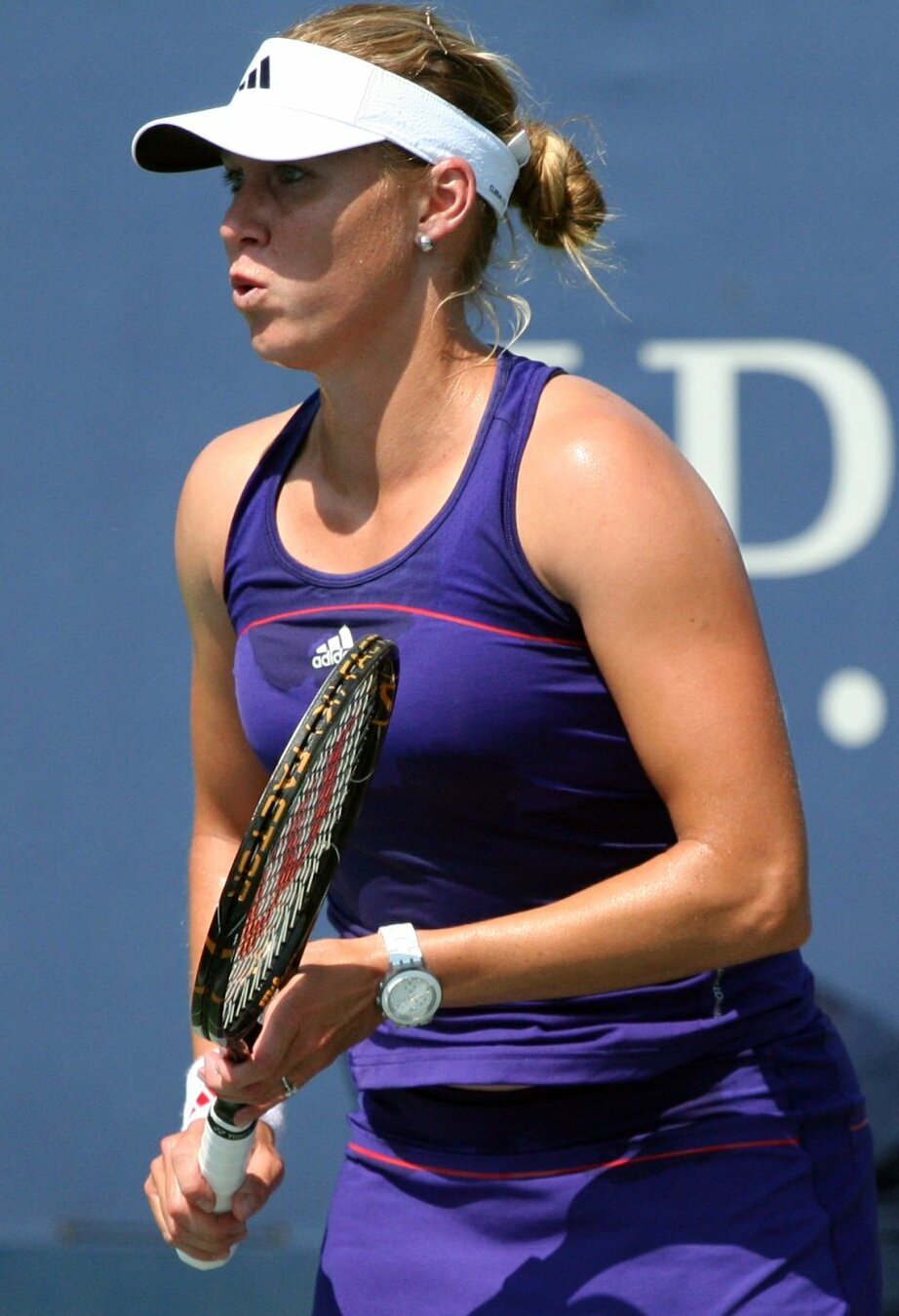
Molik at the 2010 US Open.

== Performance timelines ==
Key
W	F	SF	QF	#R	RR	Q#	P#	DNQ	A	Z#	PO	G	S	B	NMS	NTI	P	NH

(W) winner; (F) finalist; (SF) semifinalist; (QF) quarterfinalist; (#R) rounds 4, 3, 2, 1; (RR) round-robin stage; (Q#) qualification round; (P#) preliminary round; (DNQ) did not qualify; (A) absent; (Z#) Davis/Fed Cup Zonal Group (with number indication) or (PO) play-off; (G) gold, (S) silver or (B) bronze Olympic/Paralympic medal; (NMS) not a Masters tournament; (NTI) not a Tier I tournament; (P) postponed; (NH) not held; (SR) strike rate (events won / competed); (W–L) win–loss record.

=== Singles ===
Tournament	1998	1999	2000	2001	2002	2003	2004	2005	2006	2007	2008	2009	2010	2011	W–L
Grand Slam tournaments
Australian Open	Q2	1R	3R	1R	1R	1R	4R	QF	A	3R	2R	A	1R	2R	13–11
French Open	A	3R	1R	1R	1R	1R	1R	A	3R	1R	Q1	A	1R	A	4–9
Wimbledon	A	1R	2R	2R	1R	3R	3R	A	2R	2R	Q1	A	2R	A	9–9
US Open	A	1R	2R	3R	2R	3R	2R	1R	1R	1R	A	A	1R	A	7–10
Win–loss	0–0	2–4	4–4	3–4	1–4	4–4	6–4	4–2	3–3	3–4	1–1	0–0	1–4	1–1	33–39
National representation
Summer Olympics	not held		1R	not held			SF-B	not held			1R	not held			5–3
WTA Premier Mandatory Tournaments
Dubai	not held			not Tier I								A	2R	A	1–1
Indian Wells	A	2R	Q1	Q1	A	A	3R	A	A	3R	A	A	4R	A	7–4
Miami	A	2R	Q2	1R	1R	4R	4R	4R	A	1R	A	A	2R	A	9–8
Madrid	not held											A	Q1	A	0–0
Berlin	A	Q1	A	A	A	A	A	A	A	A	A	not held			0–0
Rome	A	A	A	A	A	A	1R	A	1R	A	Q1	A	Q2	A	0–2
Canada	A	A	A	Q1	Q2	1R	A	A	1R	A	A	A	Q1	A	0–2
Cincinnati	not held						not Tier I					A	A	A	0–0
Tokyo	A	A	A	A	Q3	A	1R	A	A	A	A	A	A	A	0–1
Beijing	not held		not Tier I									A	A	A	0-0
Charleston	A	A	A	A	1R	A	A	A	A	1R	1R	not Tier I			0–3
San Diego	not Tier I						3R	A	A	A	not held		not Tier I		2–1
Zürich	A	A	A	A	A	1R	W	1R	1R	Q2	not Tier I				5–3
Moscow	A	A	A	A	A	Q2	A	1R	A	1R	A	not Tier I			0–2
Career statistics
Titles-Finals	0–0	0–0	0–0	0–0	0–0	1–3	4–5	1–2	0–0	0–0	0–0	0–0	0–0	0–0	6–10
Year-end ranking	172	94	115	47	100	35	13	29	163	58	311	309	110	317	-

=== Doubles ===
Tournament	1998	1999	2000	2001	2002	2003	2004	2005	2006	2007	2008	2009	2010	2011	W–L
Grand Slam tournaments
Australian Open	1R	1R	2R	2R	3R	A	A	W	A	1R	3R	A	1R	2R	13–9
French Open	A	2R	1R	1R	3R	QF	1R	A	1R	W	1R	A	1R	A	12–9
Wimbledon	A	3R	3R	1R	1R	2R	2R	A	A	SF	1R	A	1R	A	10–9
US Open	A	2R	1R	3R	1R	1R	1R	QF	A	3R	A	1R	1R	A	8–10
Win–loss	0–1	4–4	3–4	3–4	4–4	4–3	1–3	9–1	0–1	13–3	2–2	0–1	0–4	1–1	43–38
Year-end championship
WTA Tour Championships	A	A	A	A	A	A	A	A	A	A	A	A	A	A	0–0
National representation
Summer Olympics	not held		A	not held			QF	not held			1R	not held			2–2
WTA Premier Mandatory Tournaments
Dubai	not held			not Tier I								A	2R	A	1–1
Indian Wells	A	A	A	Q2	A	A	2R	A	A	1R	A	A	A	A	1–2
Miami	A	A	1R	Q1	A	Q1	QF	W	A	2R	A	A	1R	A	8–4
Madrid	not held											A	A	A	0–0
Rome	A	A	A	1R	A	A	1R	A	A	A	2R	A	1R	A	1–4
Canada	A	A	A	1R	2R	2R	A	A	1R	SF	A	A	A	A	5–5
Cincinnati	not held						not Tier I					A	A	A	0–0
Tokyo	A	A	A	A	Q1	A	A	A	A	A	A	A	A	A	0–0
Beijing	not held		not Tier I									A	A	A	0–0
Career statistics
Titles-Finals	0-0	0-0	0-1	0-0	0-0	0-2	3-4	3-4	0-1	1-4	0-0	0-0	0-0	0-0	7–16
Year-end ranking	210	67	69	95	104	36	17	12	173	12	122	562	330	368	-

=== Mixed doubles ===
Tournament	1999	2000	2001	2002	2003	2004	2005	2006	2007	2008	2009	2010	2011	W–L
Grand Slam tournaments
Australian Open	1R	1R	2R	1R	A	A	A	A	1R	1R	A	1R	1R	1–8
French Open	1R	1R	A	A	A	QF	A	A	A	1R	A	A	A	2–4
Wimbledon	3R	1R	A	A	3R	F	A	1R	F	3R	A	A	A	16–7
US Open	A	1R	A	A	A	F	2R	A	2R	A	A	A	A	6–4
Win–loss	2–3	0–4	1–1	0–1	2–1	10–3	1–1	0–1	5–3	2–3	0–0	0–1	0–1	25–23

== Significant finals ==
=== Grand slams ===
==== Women's doubles: 2 finals (2 titles) ====
Result	Year	Tournament	Surface	Partner	Opponents	Score
Win	2005	Australian Open	Hard	(Russia) Svetlana Kuznetsova	(United States) Lindsay Davenport (United States) Corina Morariu	6–3, 6–4
Win	2007	French Open	Clay	(Italy) Mara Santangelo	(Slovenia) Katarina Srebotnik (Japan) Ai Sugiyama	7–6^{(7–5)}, 6–4

==== Mixed doubles: 3 finals (3 runner-ups) ====
Result	Year	Tournament	Surface	Partner	Opponents	Score
Loss	2004	Wimbledon	Grass	(Australia) Todd Woodbridge	(Zimbabwe) Cara Black (Zimbabwe) Wayne Black	6–3, 6–7^{(8–10)}, 4–6
Loss	2004	US Open	Hard	(Australia) Todd Woodbridge	(Russia) Vera Zvonareva (United States) Bob Bryan	3–6, 4–6
Loss	2007	Wimbledon	Grass	(Sweden) Jonas Björkman	(Serbia) Jelena Janković (United Kingdom) Jamie Murray	4–6, 6–3, 1–6

=== Olympics ===
==== Singles: (bronze medal) ====
Result	Year	Tournament	Surface	Opponent	Score
Bronze	2004	Athens	Hard	(Russia) Anastasia Myskina	6–3, 6–4

=== WTA 1000 ===
==== Singles: 1 final (1 title) ====
Result	Year	Tournament	Surface	Opponent	Score
Win	2004	Zurich Open	Hard (i)	(Russia) Maria Sharapova	4–6, 6–2, 6–3

==== Doubles: 1 final (1 title) ====
Result	Year	Tournament	Surface	Partner	Opponents	Score
Win	2005	Miami Masters	Hard	(Russia) Svetlana Kuznetsova	(United States) Lisa Raymond (Australia) Rennae Stubbs	7–5, 6–7^{(5–7)}, 6–2

== WTA Tour finals ==
=== Singles: 9 (5 titles, 4 runner-ups) ===
Legend
WTA 1000 (Tier I)
WTA 500 (Tier II)
WTA 250 (Tier III / Tier IV / Tier V)

Result	W–L	Date	Tournament	Tier	Surface	Opponent	Score
Win	1.	12 January 2003	Hobart International	Tier V	Hard	(United States) Amy Frazier	6–2, 4–6, 6–4
Loss	1.	31 March 2003	Sarasota Clay Court Classic	Tier IV	Clay	(Russia) Anastasia Myskina	4–6, 4–1
Loss	2.	14 April 2003	Budapest Grand Prix	Tier V	Clay	(Spain) Magüi Serna	6–3, 5–7, 4–6
Loss	3.	17 May 2004	WTA Austrian Open	Tier III	Clay	(Israel) Anna Smashnova-Pistolesi	2–6, 6–3, 2–6
Win	2.	8 August 2004	Nordea Nordic Light Open	Tier IV	Hard	(Ukraine) Tatiana Perebiynis	6–1, 6–1
Win	3.	24 October 2004	Zurich Open	Tier I	Hard (i)	(Russia) Maria Sharapova	4–6, 6–2, 6–3
Win	4.	31 October 2004	Luxembourg Open	Tier III	Hard (i)	(Russia) Dinara Safina	6–3, 6–4
Win	5.	15 January 2005	Sydney International	Tier II	Hard	(Australia) Sam Stosur	6–7^{(5–7)}, 6–4, 7–5
Loss	4.	21 February 2005	Qatar Ladies Open	Tier II	Hard	(Russia) Maria Sharapova	6–4, 1–6, 4–6

=== Doubles: 16 (7 titles, 9 runner-ups) ===
Legend
Grand Slam tournaments
WTA 1000 (Tier I)
WTA 500 (Tier II)
WTA 250 ()

Result	W–L	Date	Tournament	Tier	Surface	Partner	Opponents	Score
Loss	1.	15 January 2000	Hobart International		Hard	(Belgium) Kim Clijsters	(Italy) Rita Grande (France) Émilie Loit	2–6, 6–2, 3–6
Loss	2.	14 June 2003	DFS Classic		Grass	(United States) Martina Navratilova	(Belgium) Els Callens (United States) Meilen Tu	5–7, 4–6
Loss	3.	23 August 2003	New Haven Open at Yale		Hard	(Spain) Magüi Serna	(Spain) Virginia Ruano Pascual (Argentina) Paola Suárez	6–7^{(6–8)}, 3–6
Loss	4.	10 April 2004	Bausch & Lomb Championships		Clay	(Switzerland) Myriam Casanova	(Russia) Nadia Petrova (United States) Meghann Shaughnessy	6–3, 2–6, 5–7
Win	1.	19 June 2004	Eastbourne International		Grass	(Spain) Magüi Serna	(Russia) Svetlana Kuznetsova (Russia) Elena Likhovtseva	6–4, 6–4
Win	2.	7 August 2004	Nordea Nordic Light Open		Hard	(Austria) Barbara Schett	(Switzerland) Emmanuelle Gagliardi (Germany) Anna-Lena Grönefeld	6–3, 6–3
Win	3.	1 November 2004	Advanta Championships of Philadelphia		Hard (i)	(United States) Lisa Raymond	(South Africa) Liezel Huber (United States) Corina Morariu	7–5, 6–4
Win	4.	28 January 2005	Australian Open	Grand Slam	Hard	(Russia) Svetlana Kuznetsova	(United States) Lindsay Davenport (United States) Corina Morariu	6–3, 6–4
Win	5.	26 February 2005	Qatar Ladies Open		Hard	(Italy) Francesca Schiavone	(Zimbabwe) Cara Black (South Africa) Liezel Huber	6–3, 6–4
Loss	5.	5 March 2005	Dubai Tennis Championships		Hard	(Russia) Svetlana Kuznetsova	(Spain) Virginia Ruano Pascual (Argentina) Paola Suárez	7–6^{(9–7)}, 2–6, 1–6
Win	6.	27 March 2005	Miami Masters	Tier I	Hard	(Russia) Svetlana Kuznetsova	(United States) Lisa Raymond (Australia) Rennae Stubbs	7–5, 6–7^{(5–7)}, 6–2
Loss	6.	27 May 2006	İstanbul Cup		Hard	(India) Sania Mirza	(Ukraine) Alona Bondarenko (Belarus) Anastasiya Yakimova	2–6, 4–6
Loss	7.	24 February 2007	Dubai Tennis Championships		Hard	(Russia) Svetlana Kuznetsova	(Zimbabwe) Cara Black (South Africa) Liezel Huber	6–7^{(6–8)}, 4–6
Loss	8.	25 May 2007	Internationaux de Strasbourg		Clay	(China) Sun Tiantian	(China) Yan Zi (China) Zheng Jie	3–6, 4–6
Win	7.	9 June 2007	French Open	Grand Slam	Clay	(Italy) Mara Santangelo	(Slovenia) Katarina Srebotnik (Japan) Ai Sugiyama	7-6^{(7–5)}, 6–4
Loss	9.	11 August 2007	LA Women's Tennis Championships		Hard	(Italy) Mara Santangelo	(Czech Republic) Květa Peschke (Australia) Rennae Stubbs	0–6, 1–6

== ITF Circuit finals ==
=== Singles: 19 (13 titles, 6 runner-ups) ===
Legend
$50,000 tournaments
$25,000 tournaments
$10,000 tournaments

Result	W–L	Date	Tournament	Tier	Surface	Opponent	Score
Win	1.	14 March 1998	Wodonga, Australia	10,000	Grass	(Australia) Lisa McShea	6–3, 6–2
Win	2.	13 September 1998	Kugayama, Japan	10,000	Hard	(Australia) Bryanne Stewart	6–4, 6–2
Win	3.	20 September 1998	Ibaraki, Japan	10,000	Hard	(Japan) Riei Kawamata	6–2, 6–1
Win	4.	27 September 1998	Ibaraki, Japan	10,000	Hard	(Japan) Yoshiko Sasano	3–6, 6–0, 6–1
Win	5.	4 October 1998	Kugayama, Japan	10,000	Carpet (i)	(Japan) Ayami Takase	6–2, 6–3
Win	6.	11 October 1998	Saga, Japan	25,000	Grass	(Australia) Jelena Dokic	6–4, 6–3
Win	7.	25 October 1998	Gold Coast, Australia	25,000	Hard	(Australia) Catherine Barclay	6–4, 7–6
Loss	1.	11 April 1999	Fresno, United States	25,000	Hard	(Australia) Annabel Ellwood	6–3, 4–6, 2–6
Win	8.	24 October 1999	Gold Coast, Australia	25,000	Hard	(Australia) Annabel Ellwood	6–4, 6–3
Loss	2.	1 April 2001	Stone Mountain, United States	25,000	Hard	(Austria) Marion Maruska	3–6, 3–6
Win	9.	6 May 2001	Gifu, Japan	50,000	Grass	(Australia) Bryanne Stewart	6–2, 6–3
Win	10.	13 May 2001	Fukuoka, Japan	50,000	Grass	(Japan) Saori Obata	7–5, 6–3
Loss	3.	24 November 2002	Nuriootpa, Australia	25,000	Hard	(South Korea) Cho Yoon-jeong	4–6, 1–6
Win	11.	14 September 2009	Darwin, Australia	25,000	Hard	(Australia) Sally Peers	6–3, 6–4
Loss	4.	5 October 2009	Mount Gambier, Australia	25,000	Hard	(New Zealand) Sacha Hughes	6–4, 4–6, 3–6
Loss	5.	12 October 2009	Port Pirie, Australia	25,000	Hard	(New Zealand) Sacha Hughes	6–3, 1–6, 5–7
Loss	6.	22 November 2009	Esperance, Australia	25,000	Hard	(Australia) Olivia Rogowska	1–6, 6–3, 2–6
Win	12.	29 November 2009	Kalgoorlie, Australia	25,000	Hard	(Australia) Olivia Rogowska	7–6^{(6)}, 6–3
Win	13.	6 December 2009	Bendigo, Australia	25,000	Hard	(France) Irena Pavlovic	6–3, 6–4

=== Doubles: 12 (9 titles, 3 runner-ups) ===
Legend
$50,000 tournaments
$25,000 tournaments
$10,000 tournaments

Result	W–L	Date	Tournament	Tier	Surface	Partner	Opponents	Score
Win	1.	2 March 1998	Warrnambool, Australia	10,000	Grass	(Australia) Lisa McShea	(Australia) Gail Biggs (New Zealand) Shelley Stephens	6–3, 6–1
Win	2.	14 March 1998	Wodonga, Australia	10,000	Grass	(Australia) Lisa McShea	(United Kingdom) Helen Crook (United Kingdom) Victoria Davies	6–4, 6–4
Win	3.	23 March 1998	Canberra, Australia	10,000	Carpet	(Australia) Lisa McShea	(Australia) Melissa Beadman (Australia) Bryanne Stewart	7–6^{(5)}, 6–7^{(11)}, 7–5
Win	4.	27 March 1998	Corowa, Australia	10,000	Grass	(Australia) Lisa McShea	(Japan) Tomoe Hotta (Czech Republic) Monika Maštalířová	6–0, 6–0
Win	5.	13 September 1998	Kugayama, Japan	10,000	Hard	(Australia) Bryanne Stewart	(Japan) Aiko Matsuda (Japan) Yasuko Nishimata	6–1, 6–3
Win	6.	27 September 1998	Ibaraki, Japan	10,000	Hard	(Australia) Bryanne Stewart	(Japan) Riei Kawamata (Japan) Yoshiko Sasano	1–6, 6–3, 6–3
Win	7.	4 October 1998	Kyoto, Japan	10,000	Hard	(Australia) Bryanne Stewart	(Japan) Shizu Katsumi (Japan) Ayami Takase	3–6, 6–3, 6–4
Win	8.	11 October 1998	Saga, Japan	25,000	Grass	(Australia) Catherine Barclay	(Australia) Evie Dominikovic (Australia) Bryanne Stewart	7–6, 6–4
Loss	1.	17 October 1999	Queensland, Australia	25,000	Hard	(Australia) Bryanne Stewart	(Australia) Kerry-Anne Guse (Australia) Lisa McShea	1–6, 6–3, 5–7
Loss	2.	4 March 2001	Minneapolis, United States	50,000	Hard (i)	(Belgium) Laurence Courtois	(Netherlands) Yvette Basting (Ukraine) Elena Tatarkova	5–7, 6–7^{(0)}
Loss	3.	26 March 2001	Stone Mountain, United States	25,000	Hard	(Australia) Bryanne Stewart	(Japan) Rika Fujiwara (South Korea) Jeon Mi-ra	5–7, 3–6
DNP	–	11 March 2003	Fountain Hills, United States	50,000	Hard	(Australia) Trudi Musgrave	(China) Yan Zi (China) Zheng Jie	—N/a
Win	9.	18 September 2009	Darwin, Australia	25,000	Clay	(Australia) Nicole Kriz	(Australia) Tyra Calderwood (Australia) Olivia Rogowska	6–3, 6–4
