= 2001 Kremlin Cup – Women's singles =

Women's singles
- 2001 Kremlin Cup

Final
- Champion: (Federal Republic of Yugoslavia) Jelena Dokic
- Runner-up: (Russia) Elena Dementieva
- Score: 6–3, 6–3

Details
- Draw: 28 (2WC/4Q/1LL)
- Seeds: 8

Events
| Singles | men | women |
| Doubles | men | women |
- Kremlin Cup

Jelena Dokic defeated Elena Dementieva in the final, 6–3, 6–3 to win the women's singles tennis title at the 2001 Kremlin Cup.

Martina Hingis was the defending champion, but lost to Dementieva in the quarterfinals.

== Seeds ==
The top four seeds received a bye to the second round.

1. (Switzerland) Martina Hingis (quarterfinals)
2. (France) Amélie Mauresmo (second round)
3. (Belgium) Justine Henin (second round)
4. (France) Nathalie Tauziat (second round)
5. (Federal Republic of Yugoslavia) Jelena Dokic (champion)
6. (Italy) Silvia Farina Elia (semifinals)
7. (Bulgaria) Magdalena Maleeva (second round)
8. (Russia) Elena Dementieva (final)

== Draw ==
Key

- Q = Qualifier
- WC = Wild card
- LL = Lucky loser
- Alt = Alternate
- ITF = ITF entry
- PR = Protected ranking
- SR = Special ranking
- SE = Special exempt
- JE = Junior exempt
- JR = Junior Accelerator Programme entrant
- CO = College Accelerator Programme entrant
- NG = Next Gen Accelerator Program entrant
- w/o = Walkover
- r = Retired
- d = Defaulted

=== Finals ===
Semifinals
8 | (Russia) Elena Dementieva | 6^{7} | 6 | 7
WC | (Russia) Anastasia Myskina | 7^{9} | 1 | 5
5 | (Federal Republic of Yugoslavia) Jelena Dokic | 6 | 6
6 | (Italy) Silvia Farina Elia | 4 | 3

Final
8 | (Russia) Elena Dementieva | 3 | 3
5 | (Federal Republic of Yugoslavia) Jelena Dokic | 6 | 6

=== Top half ===
First round
Q | (Czech Republic) S Kleinová | 7^{8} | 6
(Spain) Á Montolio | 6^{6} | 1
(Luxembourg) A Kremer | 2 | 3
Q | (United States) A Stevenson | 6 | 6
Q | (Russia) E Bovina | 3 | 4
8 | (Russia) E Dementieva | 6 | 6
(Austria) B Schett | 6 | 6
(Russia) E Likhovtseva | 1 | 4
(Spain) M Serna | 2 | 2
WC | (Russia) A Myskina | 6 | 6
(Germany) A Huber | 3 | 5
7 | (Bulgaria) M Maleeva | 6 | 7

Second round
1 | (Switzerland) M Hingis | 7 | 6
Q | (Czech Republic) S Kleinová | 5 | 2
Q | (United States) A Stevenson | 6 | 5 | 2
8 | (Russia) E Dementieva | 2 | 7 | 6
3 | (Belgium) J Henin | 7 | 6^{6} | 2
(Austria) B Schett | 5 | 7^{8} | 6
WC | (Russia) A Myskina | 6 | 3 | 6
7 | (Bulgaria) M Maleeva | 4 | 6 | 4

Quarterfinals
1 | (Switzerland) M Hingis | 2 | 2
8 | (Russia) E Dementieva | 6 | 6
(Austria) B Schett | 4 | 2
WC | (Russia) A Myskina | 6 | 6

Semifinals
8 | (Russia) E Dementieva | 6^{6} | 6 | 7
WC | (Russia) A Myskina | 7^{8} | 1 | 5

=== Bottom half ===
First round
5 | (Federal Republic of Yugoslavia) J Dokic | 6 | 5 | 7
(Russia) L Krasnoroutskaya | 3 | 7 | 5
(Russia) A Kournikova | 2 | 6 | 2
WC | (Russia) G Fokina | 6 | 1 | 6
(Russia) N Petrova | 4 | 2
(Italy) F Schiavone | 6 | 6
6 | (Italy) S Farina Elia | 6 | 6
Q | (Slovakia) M Suchá | 3 | 2
(Uzbekistan) I Tulyaganova | 6 | 6
LL | (Russia) T Panova | 2 | 2
(Spain) C Torrens Valero | 0 | 3
(Czech Republic) D Bedáňová | 6 | 6

Second round
5 | (Federal Republic of Yugoslavia) J Dokic | 6 | 6
WC | (Russia) G Fokina | 4 | 3
(Italy) F Schiavone | 6 | 5 | 7
4 | (France) N Tauziat | 4 | 7 | 5
6 | (Italy) S Farina Elia | 7 | 4 | 7^{7}
(Uzbekistan) I Tulyaganova | 5 | 6 | 6^{5}
(Czech Republic) D Bedáňová | 6 | 6^{6} | 6
2 | (France) A Mauresmo | 2 | 7^{8} | 4

Quarterfinals
5 | (Federal Republic of Yugoslavia) J Dokic | 6 | 6
(Italy) F Schiavone | 2 | 0
6 | (Italy) S Farina Elia | 1 | 7^{11} | 6
(Czech Republic) D Bedáňová | 6 | 6^{9} | 4

Semifinals
5 | (Federal Republic of Yugoslavia) J Dokic | 6 | 6
6 | (Italy) S Farina Elia | 4 | 3

== Qualifying ==
=== Qualifying seeds ===
1. (Russia) Tatiana Panova (qualifying competition, lucky loser)
2. (Zimbabwe) Cara Black (second round)
3. (Russia) Elena Bovina (qualified)
4. (Germany) Jana Kandarr (first round)
5. (Spain) Marta Marrero (second round)
6. (France) Virginie Razzano (first round)
7. (Slovakia) Martina Suchá (qualified)
8. (Czech Republic) Adriana Gerši (qualifying competition)

=== Qualifiers ===
1. (United States) Alexandra Stevenson
2. (Slovakia) Martina Suchá
3. (Russia) Elena Bovina
4. (Czech Republic) Sandra Kleinová

=== Lucky loser ===
1. (Russia) Tatiana Panova

=== Qualifying draw ===
==== First qualifier ====
First round
1 | (Russia) Tatiana Panova | 7 | 6
(Belgium) Laurence Courtois | 5 | 1
(United Kingdom) Lucie Ahl | 6 | 2 | 2
(Ukraine) Julia Vakulenko | 3 | 6 | 6
(United States) Alexandra Stevenson | 6 | 6
(Switzerland) Marie-Gaïané Mikaelian | 3 | 4
(Austria) Sylvia Plischke | 6 | 2 | 3
5 | (Spain) Marta Marrero | 1 | 6 | 6

Second round
1 | (Russia) Tatiana Panova | 6 | 6
(Ukraine) Julia Vakulenko | 4 | 2
(United States) Alexandra Stevenson | 6 | 6
5 | (Spain) Marta Marrero | 0 | 1

Qualifying competition
1 | (Russia) Tatiana Panova | 3 | 1
(United States) Alexandra Stevenson | 6 | 6

==== Second qualifier ====
First round
2 | (Zimbabwe) Cara Black | 6 | 6
WC | (Russia) Svetlana Kuznetsova | 4 | 1
(Slovakia) Karina Habšudová | 3 | 1
(Sweden) Åsa Carlsson | 6 | 6
(Canada) Maureen Drake | 7 | 1 | 3
WC | (Russia) Vera Zvonareva | 5 | 6 | 6
(Tunisia) Selima Sfar | 3 | 4
7 | (Slovakia) Martina Suchá | 6 | 6

Second round
2 | (Zimbabwe) Cara Black | 4 | 6 | 3
(Sweden) Åsa Carlsson | 6 | 3 | 6
WC | (Russia) Vera Zvonareva | 4 | 6^{5}
7 | (Slovakia) Martina Suchá | 6 | 7^{7}

Qualifying competition
(Sweden) Åsa Carlsson | 0 | 1
7 | (Slovakia) Martina Suchá | 6 | 6

==== Third qualifier ====
First round
3 | (Russia) Elena Bovina | 6 | 7
(France) Émilie Loit | 3 | 5
(Germany) Anca Barna | 6 | 6
WC | (Russia) Anna Bastrikova | 3 | 4
(Italy) Adriana Serra Zanetti | 6 | 6^{3} | 5
(Federal Republic of Yugoslavia) Dragana Zarić | 1 | 7^{7} | 7
(Kazakhstan) Irina Selyutina | 4 | 6 | 6
6 | (France) Virginie Razzano | 6 | 4 | 3

Second round
3 | (Russia) Elena Bovina | 5 | 7^{7} | 7^{8}
(Germany) Anca Barna | 7 | 6^{5} | 6^{6}
(Federal Republic of Yugoslavia) Dragana Zarić | 3 | 2
(Kazakhstan) Irina Selyutina | 6 | 6

Qualifying competition
3 | (Russia) Elena Bovina | 1 | 6 | 6
(Kazakhstan) Irina Selyutina | 6 | 2 | 4

==== Fourth qualifier ====
First round
4 | (Germany) Jana Kandarr | 4 | 1
(Czech Republic) Sandra Kleinová | 6 | 6
(Germany) Martina Müller | 2 | 4
(Czech Republic) Klára Koukalová | 6 | 6
(Germany) Andrea Glass | 2 | 6 | 6^{0}
WC | (Russia) Dinara Safina | 6 | 4 | 7^{7}
(Czech Republic) Alena Vašková | 2 | 3
8 | (Czech Republic) Adriana Gerši | 6 | 6

Second round
(Czech Republic) Sandra Kleinová | 6 | 6
(Czech Republic) Klára Koukalová | 3 | 1
WC | (Russia) Dinara Safina | 5 | 6 | 4
8 | (Czech Republic) Adriana Gerši | 7 | 4 | 6

Qualifying competition
(Czech Republic) Sandra Kleinová | 6 | 6
8 | (Czech Republic) Adriana Gerši | 1 | 0
