= 2004 Nordea Nordic Light Open – Doubles =

Doubles
- 2004 Nordea Nordic Light Open

Final
- Champions: (Australia) Alicia Molik (Austria) Barbara Schett
- Runners-up: (Switzerland) Emmanuelle Gagliardi (Germany) Anna-Lena Grönefeld
- Score: 6–3, 6–3

Details
- Draw: 16 (1WC/1LL)
- Seeds: 4

Events
Singles	Doubles
← 2003 ·	Nordic Light Open	· 2005 →

Evgenia Kulikovskaya and Elena Tatarkova were the defending champions, but Kulikovskaya did not compete this year. Tatarkova teamed up with Martina Navratilova and lost in first round to Maria Elena Camerin and Flavia Pennetta.

Alicia Molik and Barbara Schett won the title by defeating Emmanuelle Gagliardi and Anna-Lena Grönefeld 6–3, 6–3 in the final.

== Seeds ==
1. (Australia) Alicia Molik / (Austria) Barbara Schett (champions)
2. (United States) Martina Navratilova / (Ukraine) Elena Tatarkova (first round)
3. (France) Sandrine Testud / (Italy) Roberta Vinci (quarterfinals, withdrew due to a right plantar fasciitis on Vinci)
4. (Ukraine) Yuliya Beygelzimer / (Ukraine) Tatiana Perebiynis (first round)

== Draw ==
=== Key ===
- Q = Qualifier
- WC = Wild card
- LL = Lucky loser
- Alt = Alternate
- ITF = ITF entry
- PR = Protected ranking
- SR = Special ranking
- SE = Special exempt
- JE = Junior exempt
- JR = Junior Accelerator Programme entrant
- CO = College Accelerator Programme entrant
- NG = Next Gen Accelerator Program entrant
- w/o = Walkover
- r = Retired
- d = Defaulted

=== Draw ===
First round
1	(Australia) A Molik (Austria) B Schett	6	6
(France) S Beltrame (France) S Cohen-Aloro	4	4
(Slovakia) Ľ Kurhajcová (Slovakia) H Nagyová	7	4	4
(Czech Republic) I Benešová (Austria) P Wartusch	5	6	6
3	(France) S Testud (Italy) R Vinci	6	6
LL	(Hungary) K Marosi (Brazil) M Tavares	3	3
(Germany) M Müller (Belarus) N Ostrovskaya	6	5	6
(Sweden) S Arvidsson (Sweden) Å Svensson	0	7	3
(Slovenia) T Križan (Slovenia) K Srebotnik	2	6	6
(Czech Republic) D Chládková (Czech Republic) L Průšová	6	1	2
WC	(Finland) E Laine (Sweden) H Nooni	6	6
4	(Ukraine) Y Beygelzimer (Ukraine) T Perebiynis	2	0
(Italy) M Santangelo (Croatia) S Talaja	4	3
(Switzerland) E Gagliardi (Germany) AL Grönefeld	6	6
(Italy) ME Camerin (Italy) F Pennetta	6	7
2	(United States) M Navratilova (Ukraine) E Tatarkova	3	5

Quarterfinals
1	(Australia) A Molik (Austria) B Schett	6	6
(Czech Republic) I Benešová (Austria) P Wartusch	4	3
3	(France) S Testud (Italy) R Vinci
(Germany) M Müller (Belarus) N Ostrovskaya	w/o
(Slovenia) T Križan (Slovenia) K Srebotnik	6	7^{7}
WC	(Finland) E Laine (Sweden) H Nooni	3	6^{3}
(Switzerland) E Gagliardi (Germany) AL Grönefeld	4	6	6
(Italy) ME Camerin (Italy) F Pennetta	6	2	2

Semifinals
1	(Australia) A Molik (Austria) B Schett	6	7^{7}
(Germany) M Müller (Belarus) N Ostrovskaya	4	6^{1}
(Slovenia) T Križan (Slovenia) K Srebotnik	6^{4}	6	3
(Switzerland) E Gagliardi (Germany) AL Grönefeld	7^{7}	4	6

Final
1	(Australia) A Molik (Austria) B Schett	6	6
(Switzerland) E Gagliardi (Germany) AL Grönefeld	3	3
