= 2003 Kremlin Cup – Men's doubles =

Men's doubles
- 2003 Kremlin Cup

Final
- Champions: (India) Mahesh Bhupathi (Belarus) Max Mirnyi
- Runners-up: (Zimbabwe) Wayne Black (Zimbabwe) Kevin Ullyett
- Score: 6–3, 7–5

Details
- Draw: 16
- Seeds: 4

Events
Singles	men	women
Doubles	men	women
← 2002 ·	Kremlin Cup	· 2004 →

Roger Federer and Max Mirnyi were the defending champions but only Mirnyi competed that year with Mahesh Bhupathi.

Bhupathi and Mirnyi won in the final 6–3, 7–5 against Wayne Black and Kevin Ullyett.

== Seeds ==
1. (India) Mahesh Bhupathi / (Belarus) Max Mirnyi (champions)
2. (Sweden) Jonas Björkman / (The Bahamas) Mark Knowles (quarterfinals)
3. (Zimbabwe) Wayne Black / (Zimbabwe) Kevin Ullyett (final)
4. (Czech Republic) František Čermák / (Czech Republic) Leoš Friedl (quarterfinals)

== Draw ==
=== Key ===
- Q = Qualifier
- WC = Wild card
- LL = Lucky loser
- Alt = Alternate
- SE = Special exempt
- PR = Protected ranking
- ITF = ITF entry
- JE = Junior exempt
- w/o = Walkover
- r = Retired
- d = Defaulted
- SR = Special ranking

First round
1	(India) M Bhupathi (Belarus) M Mirnyi	6	6
(Czech Republic) T Cibulec (Czech Republic) P Vízner	3	4
WC	(Russia) D Golovanov (Russia) A Olhovskiy	6	6
(Spain) F Mantilla (United States) V Spadea	3	1
4	(Czech Republic) F Čermák (Czech Republic) L Friedl	6	6
(Czech Republic) J Levinský (Czech Republic) D Škoch	3	4
WC	(Russia) I Andreev (Russia) N Davydenko	7^{7}	6
(South Africa) R Koenig (Argentina) S Prieto	6^{5}	3
(Argentina) A Calleri (Spain) F López	4	3
(Slovakia) K Kučera (Germany) D Prinosil	6	6
(Argentina) J I Chela (Chile) N Massú	2	1
3	(Zimbabwe) W Black (Zimbabwe) K Ullyett	6	6
(Georgia (country)) I Labadze (Armenia) S Sargsian	6^{4}	6	7
(Russia) Y Kafelnikov (Russia) M Youzhny	7^{7}	4	5
(South Africa) D Adams (United States) J Palmer	2	3
2	(Sweden) J Björkman (The Bahamas) M Knowles	6	6

Quarterfinals
1	(India) M Bhupathi (Belarus) M Mirnyi	6	6
WC	(Russia) D Golovanov (Russia) A Olhovskiy	2	1
4	(Czech Republic) F Čermák (Czech Republic) L Friedl	6	6^{6}	4
WC	(Russia) I Andreev (Russia) N Davydenko	3	7^{8}	6
(Slovakia) K Kučera (Germany) D Prinosil	3	7^{7}	3
3	(Zimbabwe) W Black (Zimbabwe) K Ullyett	6	6^{3}	6
(Georgia (country)) I Labadze (Armenia) S Sargsian	7^{7}	6
2	(Sweden) J Björkman (The Bahamas) M Knowles	6^{3}	2

Semifinals
1	(India) M Bhupathi (Belarus) M Mirnyi	6	6
WC	(Russia) I Andreev (Russia) N Davydenko	3	1
3	(Zimbabwe) W Black (Zimbabwe) K Ullyett	6	6
(Georgia (country)) I Labadze (Armenia) S Sargsian	4	4

Final
1	(India) M Bhupathi (Belarus) M Mirnyi	6	7
3	(Zimbabwe) W Black (Zimbabwe) K Ullyett	3	5
