= 2001 Kremlin Cup =

- Date: 1–7 October
- Edition: 12th (men) / 6th (women)
- Surface: Carpet / indoors
- Location: Moscow, Russia
- Venue: Olympic Stadium

Champions

Men's singles
- (Russia) Yevgeny Kafelnikov

Women's singles
- (Federal Republic of Yugoslavia) Jelena Dokić

Men's doubles
- (Belarus) Max Mirnyi / (Australia) Sandon Stolle

Women's doubles
- (Switzerland) Martina Hingis / (Russia) Anna Kournikova
← 2000 ·	Kremlin Cup	· 2002 →

The 2001 Kremlin Cup was a tennis tournament played on indoor carpet courts at the Olympic Stadium in Moscow in Russia that was part of the International Series of the 2001 ATP Tour and of Tier I of the 2001 WTA Tour. The tournament ran from 1 October through 7 October 2001.

== Finals ==
=== Men's singles ===
(Russia) Yevgeny Kafelnikov defeated (Germany) Nicolas Kiefer 6–4, 7–5

- It was Kafelnikov's 2nd title of the year and the 24th of his career.

=== Women's singles ===
(Federal Republic of Yugoslavia) Jelena Dokić defeated (Russia) Elena Dementieva 6–3, 6–3

- It was Dokić's 3rd title of the year and the 3rd of her career.

=== Men's doubles ===
(Belarus) Max Mirnyi / (Australia) Sandon Stolle defeated (India) Mahesh Bhupathi / (United States) Jeff Tarango 6–3, 6–0

- It was Mirnyi's 1st title of the year and the 9th of his career. It was Stolle's 4th title of the year and the 20th of his career.

=== Women's doubles ===
(Switzerland) Martina Hingis / (Russia) Anna Kournikova defeated (Russia) Elena Dementieva / (Russia) Lina Krasnoroutskaya 7–6^{(7–1)}, 6–3

- It was Hingis' 1st title of the year and the 35th of her career. It was Kournikova's 2nd title of the year and the 14th of her career.
