= 2003 Nordea Nordic Light Open =

- Date: 4–10 August
- Edition: 2nd
- Category: Tier IV
- Draw: 32S / 16D
- Prize money: $140,000
- Surface: Clay / outdoor
- Location: Espoo, Finland

Champions

Singles
- (Israel) Anna Pistolesi

Doubles
- (Russia) Evgenia Kulikovskaya (Ukraine) Elena Tatarkova
← 2002 ·	Nordic Light Open	· 2004 →

The 2003 Nordea Nordic Light Open was a women's tennis tournament played on outdoor clay courts that was part of the Tier IV category of the 2003 WTA Tour. It was the second edition of the tournament and took place in Espoo, Finland from 4 August until 10 August 2003. Second-seeded Anna Pistolesi won the singles title and earned $22,000 first-prize money.

== Finals ==
=== Singles ===
(Israel) Anna Pistolesi defeated (Croatia) Jelena Kostanić, 4–6, 6–4, 6–0

- It was Pistolesi's 2nd singles title of the year and the 8th of her career.

=== Doubles ===
(Russia) Evgenia Kulikovskaya / (Ukraine) Elena Tatarkova defeated (Ukraine) Tatiana Perebiynis / (Croatia) Silvija Talaja, 6–2, 6–4
