= 2002 Kremlin Cup – Women's singles =

Women's singles
- 2002 Kremlin Cup

Final
- Champion: (Bulgaria) Magdalena Maleeva
- Runner-up: (United States) Lindsay Davenport
- Score: 5–7, 6–3, 7–6^{(7–4)}

Details
- Draw: 28 (3WC/4Q/1LL)
- Seeds: 9

Events
Singles	men	women
Doubles	men	women
- Kremlin Cup

Magdalena Maleeva defeated Lindsay Davenport in the final, 5–7, 6–3, 7–6^{(7–4)} to win the women's singles tennis title at the 2002 Kremlin Cup.

Jelena Dokić was the defending champion, but lost to Amanda Coetzer in the second round.

== Seeds ==
A champion seed is indicated in bold text while text in italics indicates the round in which that seed was eliminated. The top four seeds received a bye to the second round.

1. (United States) Venus Williams (second round)
2. ~~(United States) Jennifer Capriati~~ (withdrew)
3. (United States) Lindsay Davenport (final)
4. (Federal Republic of Yugoslavia) Jelena Dokić (second round)
5. (France) Amélie Mauresmo (semifinals)
6. (Switzerland) Martina Hingis (first round)
7. (Russia) Anastasia Myskina (first round)
8. (Italy) Silvia Farina Elia (first round)
9. (Russia) Elena Dementieva (second round)

== Draw ==
Key

- Q = Qualifier
- WC = Wild card
- LL = Lucky loser
- Alt = Alternate
- ITF = ITF entry
- PR = Protected ranking
- SR = Special ranking
- SE = Special exempt
- JE = Junior exempt
- JR = Junior Accelerator Programme entrant
- CO = College Accelerator Programme entrant
- NG = Next Gen Accelerator Program entrant
- w/o = Walkover
- r = Retired
- d = Defaulted

=== Finals ===
Semifinals
(Bulgaria) **Magdalena Maleeva**	**7**	**6**
5	(France) Amélie Mauresmo	5	4
(South Africa) Amanda Coetzer	3	4
3	(United States) **Lindsay Davenport**	**6**	**6**

Final
(Bulgaria) **Magdalena Maleeva**	5	**6**	**7^{7}**
3	(United States) Lindsay Davenport	**7**	3	6^{4}

=== Top half ===
First round
(Bulgaria) **M Maleeva**	**6**	**6**
(Israel) A Smashnova	1	2
(Greece) E Daniilidou	**6**	3	3
(France) **N Dechy**	3	**6**	**6**
(United States) **M Shaughnessy**	**6**	6^{10}	**6**
7	(Russia) A Myskina	3	**7^{12}**	4
(Luxembourg) A Kremer	5	3
(Russia) **T Panova**	**7**	**6**
LL	(Slovenia) **M Matevžič**	**6**	**7**
(Italy) R Grande	4	5
WC	(Russia) **D Safina**	0	**7^{7}**	**6**
8	(Italy) S Farina Elia	**6**	6^{4}	4

Second round
1	(United States) V Williams	**6**	1	6^{3}
(Bulgaria) **M Maleeva**	2	**6**	**7^{7}**
(France) **N Dechy**	**6**	**6**
(United States) M Shaughnessy	3	3
5	(France) **A Mauresmo**	**6**	**6**
(Russia) T Panova	4	3
LL	(Slovenia) **M Matevžič**	3	**7**	**6**
WC	(Russia) D Safina	**6**	5	3

Quarterfinals
(Bulgaria) **M Maleeva**	**6**	**6**
(France) N Dechy	4	2
5	(France) **A Mauresmo**	**7^{7}**	**6**
LL	(Slovenia) M Matevžič	6^{1}	3

Semifinals
(Bulgaria) **M Maleeva**	**7**	**6**
5	(France) A Mauresmo	5	4

=== Bottom half ===
First round
6	(Switzerland) M Hingis	2	2
(Russia) **N Petrova**	**6**	**6**
WC	(Russia) **A Kournikova**	**6**	**6**
Q	(Switzerland) M-G Mikaelian	4	3
Q	(Czech Republic) L Prusová	4	4
(South Africa) **A Coetzer**	**6**	**6**
9	(Russia) **E Dementieva**	**6**	**6**
(Croatia) I Majoli	4	1
WC	(Russia) **E Bovina**	2	**7^{7}**	**6**
Q	(Russia) V Zvonareva	**6**	6^{1}	3
Q	(Spain) **M Serna**	**6**	2	**6**
(Argentina) P Suárez	2	**6**	2

Second round
(Russia) **N Petrova**	w/o
WC	(Russia) A Kournikova
(South Africa) **A Coetzer**	**7^{7}**	3	**6**
4	(Federal Republic of Yugoslavia) J Dokić	6^{1}	**6**	3
9	(Russia) E Dementieva	1	**6**	4
WC	(Russia) **E Bovina**	**6**	4	**6**
Q	(Spain) M Serna	4	3
3	(United States) **L Davenport**	**6**	**6**

Quarterfinals
(Russia) N Petrova	2	1
(South Africa) **A Coetzer**	**6**	**6**
WC	(Russia) E Bovina	**6**	3	3
3	(United States) **L Davenport**	3	**6**	**6**

Semifinals
(South Africa) A Coetzer	3	4
3	(United States) **L Davenport**	**6**	**6**

== Qualifying ==
=== Qualifying seeds ===
1. (Austria) Barbara Schett (first round)
2. (Slovenia) Katarina Srebotnik (first round)
3. (Switzerland) **Marie-Gaïané Mikaelian (qualified)**
4. (Russia) **Vera Zvonareva (qualified)**
5. (Spain) **Magüi Serna (qualified)**
6. (Slovenia) Maja Matevžič (qualifying competition, **lucky loser**)
7. (Germany) Martina Müller (first round)
8. (Germany) Angelika Rösch (first round)

=== Qualifiers ===
1. (Spain) **Magüi Serna**
2. (Czech Republic) **Libuše Průšová**
3. (Switzerland) **Marie-Gaïané Mikaelian**
4. (Russia) **Vera Zvonareva**

=== Lucky loser ===
1. (Slovenia) **Maja Matevžič**

=== Qualifying draw ===
==== First qualifier ====
First round
1	(Austria) Barbara Schett	6^{4}	3
**(Czech Republic) Klára Koukalová**	**7^{7}**	**6**
(Germany) Jana Kandarr	3	1
**(Hungary) Anikó Kapros**	**6**	**6**
(Russia) Ekaterina Sysoeva	2	2
**(Germany) Vanessa Henke**	**6**	**6**
(Kazakhstan) Irina Selyutina	4	4
5	**(Spain) Magüi Serna**	**6**	**6**

Second round
**(Czech Republic) Klára Koukalová**	**6**	**6**
(Hungary) Anikó Kapros	1	2
(Germany) Vanessa Henke	2	3
5	**(Spain) Magüi Serna**	**6**	**6**

Qualifying competition
(Czech Republic) Klára Koukalová	2	**6**	2
5	**(Spain) Magüi Serna**	**6**	4	**6**

==== Second qualifier ====
First round
2	(Slovenia) Katarina Srebotnik	3	3
**(Russia) Maria Goloviznina**	**6**	**6**
**(Belarus) Tatiana Poutchek**	**6**	**6**
(Russia) Anastasia Rodionova	3	2
**(Czech Republic) Libuše Průšová**	**6**	**6**
WC	(Russia) Evgenia Linetskaya	2	3
**(Netherlands) Kristie Boogert**	**6**	**6**
8	(Germany) Angelika Rösch	4	2

Second round
(Russia) Maria Goloviznina	2	5
**(Belarus) Tatiana Poutchek**	**6**	**7**
**(Czech Republic) Libuše Průšová**	**6**	1
(Netherlands) Kristie Boogert	0	0^{r}

Qualifying competition
(Belarus) Tatiana Poutchek	6^{3}	**6**	2
**(Czech Republic) Libuše Průšová**	**7^{7}**	3	**6**

==== Third qualifier ====
First round
3	**(Switzerland) Marie-Gaïané Mikaelian**	**6**	**6**
WC	(Russia) Galina Voskoboeva	0	2
**(Russia) Evgenia Kulikovskaya**	**6**	**6**
WC	(Russia) Anna Bastrikova	1	0
**(Russia) Galina Fokina**	**7^{7}**	**6**
(Austria) Patricia Wartusch	6^{3}	4
WC	(Russia) Vera Dushevina	**6**	4	4
6	**(Slovenia) Maja Matevžič**	4	**6**	**6**

Second round
3	**(Switzerland) Marie-Gaïané Mikaelian**	**6**	**7^{9}**
(Russia) Evgenia Kulikovskaya	2	6^{7}
(Russia) Galina Fokina	5	**7**	2
6	**(Slovenia) Maja Matevžič**	**7**	5	**6**

Qualifying competition
3	**(Switzerland) Marie-Gaïané Mikaelian**	**6**	**7**
6	(Slovenia) Maja Matevžič	1	5

==== Fourth qualifier ====
First round
4	**(Russia) Vera Zvonareva**	**6**	**6**
(Canada) Maureen Drake	4	3
(Ukraine) Elena Tatarkova	3	4
**(Czech Republic) Sandra Kleinová**	**6**	**6**
**(Germany) Anca Barna**	4	**6**	**6**
(Sweden) Åsa Svensson	**6**	4	2
**(Czech Republic) Iveta Benešová**	**6**	**6**
7	(Germany) Martina Müller	3	2

Second round
4	**(Russia) Vera Zvonareva**	**6**	**6**
(Czech Republic) Sandra Kleinová	3	3
**(Germany) Anca Barna**	**7^{7}**	3	**6**
(Czech Republic) Iveta Benešová	6^{3}	**6**	4

Qualifying competition
4	**(Russia) Vera Zvonareva**	**6**	**7^{7}**
(Germany) Anca Barna	1	6^{5}
