= 2005 Nordea Nordic Light Open – Singles =

Singles
- 2005 Nordea Nordic Light Open

Final
- Champion: (Slovenia) Katarina Srebotnik
- Runner-up: (Russia) Anastasia Myskina
- Score: 7–5, 6–2

Events
Singles	Doubles
← 2004 ·	Nordea Nordic Light Open	· 2006 →

Alicia Molik was the defending champion, but did not compete this year.

Katarina Srebotnik won the title by defeating Anastasia Myskina 7–5, 6–2 in the final.

== Seeds ==
1. (United States) Serena Williams (withdrew)
2. (Russia) Anastasia Myskina (final)
3. (Russia) Vera Dushevina (semifinals)
4. (Spain) Anabel Medina Garrigues (second round)
5. (Slovenia) Katarina Srebotnik (champion)
6. (Slovakia) Martina Suchá (quarterfinals)
7. (Colombia) Catalina Castaño (quarterfinals)
8. (Spain) Laura Pous Tió (first round)
9. (Ukraine) Alona Bondarenko (second round)

== Draw ==
=== Finals ===
Semifinals
3	(Russia) Vera Dushevina	0	5
5	(Slovenia) Katarina Srebotnik	6	7
(France) Émilie Loit	6	1	4
2	(Russia) Anastasia Myskina	3	6	6

Final
5	(Slovenia) Katarina Srebotnik	7	6
2	(Russia) Anastasia Myskina	5	2

=== Top half ===
First round
3	(Russia) V Dushevina	6	6
Q	(Croatia) I Lisjak	4	2
(Czech Republic) E Birnerová	3	1
(Germany) J Schruff	6	6
(France) S Beltrame	6	6
Q	(Russia) A Kudryavtseva	1	2
WC	(Denmark) C Wozniacki	6^{5}	1
6	(Slovakia) M Suchá	7^{7}	6
5	(Slovenia) K Srebotnik	6	6
(Czech Republic) D Chládková	3	4
(Slovakia) Ľ Cervanová	4	1
(Russia) E Bychkova	6	6
Q	(Finland) E Laine	3	7	7^{7}
(Spain) M Sánchez Lorenzo	6	5	6^{5}
(France) S Foretz	3	6^{3}
7	(Colombia) C Castaño	6	7^{7}

Second round
3	(Russia) V Dushevina	6	4	6
(Germany) J Schruff	2	6	3
(France) S Beltrame	3	3
6	(Slovakia) M Suchá	6	6
5	(Slovenia) K Srebotnik	6	6
(Russia) E Bychkova	0	1
Q	(Finland) E Laine	6^{5}	1
7	(Colombia) C Castaño	7^{7}	6

Quarterfinals
3	(Russia) V Dushevina	3	6	6
6	(Slovakia) M Suchá	6	4	3
5	(Slovenia) K Srebotnik	4	7	6
7	(Colombia) C Castaño	6	5	1

Semifinals
3	(Russia) V Dushevina	0	5
5	(Slovenia) K Srebotnik	6	7

=== Bottom half ===
First round
8	(Spain) L Pous Tió	0	2
(France) É Loit	6	6
(Italy) M Santangelo	6	6
(Czech Republic) S Kleinová	4	1
(Spain) A Parra Santonja	1	6	6
Q	(Ukraine) O Savchuk	6	1	4
(Czech Republic) M Paštiková	4	6^{3}
4	(Spain) A Medina Garrigues	6	7^{7}
9	(Ukraine) A Bondarenko	6	6
(Tunisia) S Sfar	3	2
WC	(Sweden) S Arvidsson	6	6
(Czech Republic) B Strýcová	4	4
(France) S Cohen-Aloro	2	2
(France) C Pin	6	6
LL	(Ukraine) V Kutuzova	6	4	0
2	(Russia) A Myskina	4	6	6

Second round
(France) É Loit	6	1	6
(Italy) M Santangelo	2	6	2
(Spain) A Parra Santonja	7^{7}	6
4	(Spain) A Medina Garrigues	6^{1}	4
9	(Ukraine) A Bondarenko	2	3
WC	(Sweden) S Arvidsson	6	6
(France) C Pin	7^{7}	4	1
2	(Russia) A Myskina	6^{3}	6	6

Quarterfinals
(France) É Loit	6	7
(Spain) A Parra Santonja	2	5
WC	(Sweden) S Arvidsson	5	2
2	(Russia) A Myskina	7	6

Semifinals
(France) É Loit	6	1	4
2	(Russia) A Myskina	3	6	6
