= 2005 Nordea Nordic Light Open – Doubles =

Doubles
- 2005 Nordea Nordic Light Open

Final
- Champions: (France) Émilie Loit (Slovenia) Katarina Srebotnik
- Runners-up: (Czech Republic) Eva Birnerová (Italy) Mara Santangelo
- Score: 6–4, 6–3

Events
Singles	Doubles
← 2004 ·	Nordea Nordic Light Open	· 2006 →

Alicia Molik and Barbara Schett were the defending champions, but none competed this year. Schett retired from professional tennis during this season.

Émilie Loit and Katarina Srebotnik won the title by defeating Eva Birnerová and Mara Santangelo 6–4, 6–3 in the final.

== Seeds ==
1. (France) Émilie Loit / (Slovenia) Katarina Srebotnik (champions)
2. (Czech Republic) Eva Birnerová / (Italy) Mara Santangelo (final)
3. (Russia) Vera Dushevina / (Czech Republic) Barbora Strýcová (semifinals)
4. (Poland) Klaudia Jans / (Poland) Alicja Rosolska (first round)

== Draw ==
=== Key ===
- Q = Qualifier
- WC = Wild card
- LL = Lucky loser
- Alt = Alternate
- SE = Special exempt
- PR = Protected ranking
- ITF = ITF entry
- JE = Junior exempt
- w/o = Walkover
- r = Retired
- d = Defaulted
- SR = Special ranking

=== Draw ===
First round
1	(France) É Loit (Slovenia) K Srebotnik	6	6
(Czech Republic) M Paštiková (Spain) L Pous Tió	3	2
(Argentina) E Krauth (Sweden) H Nooni	6	6
(Czech Republic) D Chládková (Czech Republic) V Uhlířová	2	4
3	(Russia) V Dushevina (Czech Republic) B Strýcová	6	7
(Ukraine) A Bondarenko (Ukraine) V Bondarenko	1	5
(New Zealand) L Baker (Italy) F Lubiani	4	3
(Australia) T Musgrave (Germany) J Schruff	6	6
WC	(Russia) A Myskina (Denmark) C Wozniacki	4	6	3
Q	(Russia) E Bychkova (France) S Foretz	6	3	6
(Austria) D Klemenschits (Austria) S Klemenschits	6	3	6
4	(Poland) K Jans (Poland) A Rosolska	4	6	3
(United Kingdom) C Curran (Spain) MJ Martínez Sánchez	6	4	7^{7}
WC	(Sweden) S Arvidsson (Finland) E Laine	0	6	6^{4}
(Belarus) N Ostrovskaya (Russia) E Vesnina	1	4
2	(Czech Republic) E Birnerová (Italy) M Santangelo	6	6

Quarterfinals
1	(France) É Loit (Slovenia) K Srebotnik	6	6
(Argentina) E Krauth (Sweden) H Nooni	2	3
3	(Russia) V Dushevina (Czech Republic) B Strýcová	6	6
(Australia) T Musgrave (Germany) J Schruff	3	2
Q	(Russia) E Bychkova (France) S Foretz	1	4
(Austria) D Klemenschits (Austria) S Klemenschits	6	6
(United Kingdom) C Curran (Spain) MJ Martínez Sánchez	3	2
2	(Czech Republic) E Birnerová (Italy) M Santangelo	6	6

Semifinals
1	(France) É Loit (Slovenia) K Srebotnik	6	6
3	(Russia) V Dushevina (Czech Republic) B Strýcová	3	0
(Austria) D Klemenschits (Austria) S Klemenschits	5	0
2	(Czech Republic) E Birnerová (Italy) M Santangelo	7	6

Final
1	(France) É Loit (Slovenia) K Srebotnik	6	6
2	(Czech Republic) E Birnerová (Italy) M Santangelo	4	3
