= 2005 Nordea Nordic Light Open =

- Date: 8–14 August
- Edition: 4th
- Category: Tier IV Series
- Draw: 32S / 16D
- Prize money: $140,000
- Surface: Hard / outdoor
- Location: Stockholm, Sweden

Champions

Singles
- (Slovenia) Katarina Srebotnik

Doubles
- (France) Émilie Loit / (Slovenia) Katarina Srebotnik
- Nordic Light Open

The 2005 Nordea Nordic Light Open was a women's tennis tournament played on outdoor hard courts. It was the 4th edition of the Nordic Light Open, and was part of the Tier IV Series of the 2005 WTA Tour. It took place in Stockholm, Sweden, from 8 through 14 August 2005. Fifth-seeded Katarina Srebotnik won the singles title and earned $22,000 first-prize money.

== Finals ==
=== Singles ===
- (Slovenia) Katarina Srebotnik defeated (Russia) Anastasia Myskina, 7–5, 6–2

It was the 2nd title for Srebotnik in the season and the 4th title of her singles career.

=== Doubles ===
- (France) Émilie Loit / (Slovenia) Katarina Srebotnik defeated (Czech Republic) Eva Birnerová / (Italy) Mara Santangelo, 6–4, 6–3

It was the 11th title for Loit and the 10th title for Srebotnik in their respective doubles careers.
