= 2002 Kremlin Cup – Men's singles =

Men's singles
- 2002 Kremlin Cup

Final
- Champion: (France) Paul-Henri Mathieu
- Runner-up: (Netherlands) Sjeng Schalken
- Score: 4–6, 6–2, 6–0

Details
- Draw: 32 (4 Q / 3 WC )
- Seeds: 8

Events
Singles	men	women
Doubles	men	women
- Kremlin Cup

Yevgeny Kafelnikov was the five time defending champion but lost in the semifinals to Sjeng Schalken.

Paul-Henri Mathieu won in the final 4–6, 6–2, 6–0 against Schalken.

== Seeds ==
1. (Russia) Marat Safin (semifinals)
2. (Russia) Yevgeny Kafelnikov (semifinals)
3. (Spain) Albert Costa (first round)
4. (Czech Republic) Jiří Novák (second round)
5. (Switzerland) Roger Federer (quarterfinals)
6. (Sweden) Thomas Johansson (first round)
7. (Netherlands) Sjeng Schalken (final)
8. (Argentina) David Nalbandian (first round)

== Draw ==
Key

- Q = Qualifier
- WC = Wild card
- LL = Lucky loser
- Alt = Alternate
- ITF = ITF entry
- PR = Protected ranking
- SR = Special ranking
- SE = Special exempt
- JE = Junior exempt
- JR = Junior Accelerator Programme entrant
- CO = College Accelerator Programme entrant
- NG = Next Gen Accelerator Program entrant
- w/o = Walkover
- r = Retired
- d = Defaulted

=== Finals ===
Semifinals
1	(Russia) Marat Safin	6^{3}	3
Q	(France) Paul-Henri Mathieu	7^{7}	6
7	(Netherlands) Sjeng Schalken	6	6
2	(Russia) Yevgeny Kafelnikov	2	4

Final
Q	(France) Paul-Henri Mathieu	4	6	6
7	(Netherlands) Sjeng Schalken	6	2	0

=== Top half ===
First round
1	(Russia) M Safin	6	7^{7}
(Brazil) F Meligeni	4	6^{4}
(Brazil) A Sá	3	7	6
(Switzerland) M Kratochvil	6	5	4
(Finland) J Nieminen	7^{7}	3	7^{7}
(Chile) M Ríos	6^{5}	6	6^{4}
WC	(Russia) D Golovanov	0	1
5	(Switzerland) R Federer	6	6
4	(Czech Republic) J Novák	6	3	6
(Russia) M Youzhny	4	6	3
Q	(France) P-H Mathieu	6^{4}	7	6
(Spain) T Robredo	7^{7}	5	2
(Sweden) J Björkman	4	7	6
(Belarus) M Mirnyi	6	5	2
(Germany) R Schüttler	7^{8}	6
8	(Argentina) D Nalbandian	6^{6}	4

Second round
1	(Russia) M Safin	7^{7}	4	7
(Brazil) A Sá	6^{3}	6	5
(Finland) J Nieminen	1	4
5	(Switzerland) R Federer	6	6
4	(Czech Republic) J Novák	6	3	4
Q	(France) P-H Mathieu	4	6	6
(Sweden) J Björkman	1	3
(Germany) R Schüttler	6	6

Quarterfinals
1	(Russia) M Safin	7	6
5	(Switzerland) R Federer	5	4
Q	(France) P-H Mathieu	4	6	6
(Germany) R Schüttler	6	2	3

Semifinals
1	(Russia) M Safin	6^{3}	4
Q	(France) P-H Mathieu	7^{7}	6

=== Bottom half ===
First round
7	(Netherlands) S Schalken	3	6	6
Q	(Switzerland) M Rosset	6	3	4
(Spain) F Vicente	6^{8}	4
(South Africa) W Ferreira	7^{10}	6
(Morocco) Y El Aynaoui	4	3
(Croatia) I Ljubičić	6	6
(France) N Escudé	7	3	6
3	(Spain) A Costa	5	6	1
6	(Sweden) T Johansson	6^{5}	6^{2}
SE	(Czech Republic) B Ulihrach	7^{7}	7^{7}
(Italy) D Sanguinetti	4	1
Q	(France) C Saulnier	6	6
WC	(Russia) A Stoliarov	1	4
Q	(Germany) N Kiefer	6	6
WC	(Belarus) V Voltchkov	6	3	6^{4}
2	(Russia) Y Kafelnikov	4	6	7^{7}

Second round
7	(Netherlands) S Schalken	7	6
(South Africa) W Ferreira	5	0
(Croatia) I Ljubičić	6^{5}	4
(France) N Escudé	7^{7}	6
SE	(Czech Republic) B Ulihrach	3	2
Q	(France) C Saulnier	6	6
Q	(Germany) N Kiefer	4	2
2	(Russia) Y Kafelnikov	6	6

Quarterfinals
7	(Netherlands) S Schalken	6	6^{4}	6
(France) N Escudé	4	7^{7}	3
Q	(France) C Saulnier	3	5
2	(Russia) Y Kafelnikov	6	7

Semifinals
7	(Netherlands) S Schalken	6	6
2	(Russia) Y Kafelnikov	2	4
