= 2002 Kremlin Cup – Women's doubles =

Women's doubles
- 2002 Kremlin Cup

Final
- Champions: (Russia) Elena Dementieva (Slovakia) Janette Husárová
- Runners-up: (Federal Republic of Yugoslavia) Jelena Dokic (Russia) Nadia Petrova
- Score: 2–6, 6–3, 7–6^{(9–7)}

Details
- Draw: 16 (1WC/1Q)
- Seeds: 4

Events
Singles	men	women
Doubles	men	women
- Kremlin Cup

Martina Hingis and Anna Kournikova were the defending champions, but Hingis did not compete this year as she chose to focus only on the singles tournament. Kournikova teamed up with Meghann Shaughnessy and the pair were forced to retire in their quarterfinals match against Jelena Dokic and Nadia Petrova.

Elena Dementieva and Janette Husárová won the title by defeating Dokic and Petrova 2–6, 6–3, 7–6^{(9–7)} in the final.

== Seeds ==
1. (Russia) Elena Dementieva / (Slovakia) Janette Husárová (champions)
2. (Russia) Anna Kournikova / (United States) Meghann Shaughnessy (quarterfinals, retired)
3. (United States) Nicole Arendt / (South Africa) Liezel Huber (first round)
4. (Slovenia) Tina Križan / (Slovenia) Katarina Srebotnik (first round)

== Draw ==
Key

- Q = Qualifier
- WC = Wild card
- LL = Lucky loser
- Alt = Alternate
- ITF = ITF entry
- PR = Protected ranking
- SR = Special ranking
- SE = Special exempt
- JE = Junior exempt
- JR = Junior Accelerator Programme entrant
- CO = College Accelerator Programme entrant
- NG = Next Gen Accelerator Program entrant
- w/o = Walkover
- r = Retired
- d = Defaulted

=== Draw ===
First round
1	(Russia) E Dementieva (Slovakia) J Husárová	6	6
Q	(Australia) C Barclay (Germany) M Müller	1	3
(Belarus) T Poutchek (Ukraine) E Tatarkova	5	6	6^{5}
(Bulgaria) M Maleeva (Sweden) Å Svensson	7	3	7
4	(Slovenia) T Križan (Slovenia) K Srebotnik	3	1
WC	(Russia) A Myskina (Russia) D Safina	6	6
(Russia) E Likhovtseva (Belarus) N Zvereva	3	4
(Argentina) L Montalvo (Argentina) P Suárez	6	6
(Italy) R Grande (Spain) M Serna	6^{4}	6	6
(South Africa) N de Villiers (Kazakhstan) I Selyutina	7	4	3
(Russia) E Bovina (France) N Dechy	6	4	6
3	(United States) N Arendt (South Africa) L Huber	4	6	2
(Federal Republic of Yugoslavia) J Dokic (Russia) N Petrova	6	6
(Russia) A Rodionova (Austria) P Wartusch	1	2
(South Africa) A Coetzer (Italy) S Farina Elia	3	2
2	(Russia) A Kournikova (United States) M Shaughnessy	6	6

Quarterfinals
1	(Russia) E Dementieva (Slovakia) J Husárová	4	6	6
(Bulgaria) M Maleeva (Sweden) Å Svensson	6	0	1
WC	(Russia) A Myskina (Russia) D Safina	6	6^{3}	3
(Argentina) L Montalvo (Argentina) P Suárez	3	7	6
(Italy) R Grande (Spain) M Serna	6	2	1
(Russia) E Bovina (France) N Dechy	4	6	6
(Federal Republic of Yugoslavia) J Dokic (Russia) N Petrova	6	1
2	(Russia) A Kournikova (United States) M Shaughnessy	4	6	r

Semifinals
1	(Russia) E Dementieva (Slovakia) J Husárová	6	6
(Argentina) L Montalvo (Argentina) P Suárez	4	2
(Russia) E Bovina (France) N Dechy	6	4	3
(Federal Republic of Yugoslavia) J Dokic (Russia) N Petrova	4	6	6

Final
1	(Russia) E Dementieva (Slovakia) J Husárová	2	6	7
(Federal Republic of Yugoslavia) J Dokic (Russia) N Petrova	6	3	6^{7}

== Qualifying ==
=== Qualifying seeds ===
1. (Russia) Evgenia Kulikovskaya / (Russia) Ekaterina Sysoeva (qualifying competition)
2. (Russia) Galina Fokina / (Slovenia) Maja Matevžič (first round)

=== Qualifiers ===
1. (Australia) Catherine Barclay / (Germany) Martina Müller

=== Qualifying draw ===
First round
1	(Russia) Evgenia Kulikovskaya (Russia) Ekaterina Sysoeva	8
WC	(Russia) Vera Dushevina (Russia) Galina Voskoboeva	3
(Australia) Catherine Barclay (Germany) Martina Müller	8
2	(Russia) Galina Fokina (Slovenia) Maja Matevžič	6

Qualifying competition
1	(Russia) Evgenia Kulikovskaya (Russia) Ekaterina Sysoeva	3	4
(Australia) Catherine Barclay (Germany) Martina Müller	6	6
