= 2002 Nordea Nordic Light Open =

- Date: 5–11 August
- Edition: 1st
- Category: Tier IV
- Draw: 32S / 16D
- Prize money: $140,000
- Surface: Clay / outdoor
- Location: Espoo, Finland

Champions

Singles
- (Russia) Svetlana Kuznetsova

Doubles
- (Russia) Svetlana Kuznetsova (Spain) Arantxa Sánchez Vicario
Nordic Light Open	· 2003 →

The 2002 Nordea Nordic Light Open was a women's tennis tournament played on outdoor clay courts that was part of the Tier IV category of the 2002 WTA Tour. It was the inaugural edition of the tournament and took place in Espoo, Finland from 5 August until 11 August 2002. Qualifier Svetlana Kuznetsova won the singles title and earned $22,000 first-prize money.

== Finals ==
=== Singles ===
(Russia) Svetlana Kuznetsova defeated (Czech Republic) Denisa Chládková, 0–6, 6–3, 7–6^{(7–2)}

- It was Kuznetsova's first singles title of her career.

=== Doubles ===
(Russia) Svetlana Kuznetsova / (Spain) Arantxa Sánchez Vicario defeated (Spain) Eva Bes-Ostariz / (Spain) María José Martínez Sánchez, 6–3, 6–7^{(5–7)}, 6–3
