= 2003 Nordea Nordic Light Open – Singles =

Singles
- 2003 Nordea Nordic Light Open

Final
- Champion: (Israel) Anna Pistolesi
- Runner-up: (Croatia) Jelena Kostanić
- Score: 4–6, 6–4, 6–0

Details
- Draw: 32 (2WC/4Q/2LL)
- Seeds: 8

Events
Singles	Doubles
- Nordic Light Open

Svetlana Kuznetsova was the defending champion but chose to compete at Los Angeles during the same week, reaching the quarterfinals.

Anna Pistolesi won the title by defeating qualifier Jelena Kostanić 4–6, 6–4, 6–0 in the final.

== Seeds ==
1. (Switzerland) Patty Schnyder (first round)
2. (Israel) Anna Pistolesi (champion)
3. (Czech Republic) Denisa Chládková (second round)
4. (Hungary) Petra Mandula (quarterfinals, retired due to a strain in her right quadriceps)
5. (Italy) Flavia Pennetta (first round)
6. (Germany) Anca Barna (first round)
7. (Argentina) Clarisa Fernández (first round)
8. (Croatia) Karolina Šprem (semifinals)

== Draw ==
Key

- Q = Qualifier
- WC = Wild card
- LL = Lucky loser
- Alt = Alternate
- ITF = ITF entry
- PR = Protected ranking
- SR = Special ranking
- SE = Special exempt
- JE = Junior exempt
- JR = Junior Accelerator Programme entrant
- CO = College Accelerator Programme entrant
- NG = Next Gen Accelerator Program entrant
- w/o = Walkover
- r = Retired
- d = Defaulted

=== Finals ===
Semifinals
Q	(Croatia) Jelena Kostanić	7^{7}	6
(Russia) Vera Dushevina	6^{2}	4
8	(Croatia) Karolina Šprem	3	6	4
2	(Israel) Anna Pistolesi	6	1	6

Final
Q	(Croatia) Jelena Kostanić	6	4	0
2	(Israel) Anna Pistolesi	4	6	6

=== Top half ===
First round
1	(Switzerland) P Schnyder	6^{4}	2
(Croatia) S Talaja	7^{7}	6
(Czech Republic) Z Ondrášková	6	6
WC	(Finland) E Laine	1	1
(Russia) E Kulikovskaya	3	6	6^{6}
LL	(Spain) M Marrero	6	3	7^{8}
Q	(Croatia) J Kostanić	6	7^{10}
5	(Italy) F Pennetta	4	6^{8}
3	(Czech Republic) D Chládková	6	6
(Spain) G León García	3	2
(Russia) V Dushevina	6	6^{5}	6
(Czech Republic) I Benešová	4	7^{7}	1
(Spain) A Medina Garrigues	7	6
LL	(Hungary) K Marosi	5	2
(Hungary) M Czink	2	6	7^{7}
7	(Argentina) C Fernández	6	2	6^{4}

Second round
(Croatia) S Talaja	0	6	6
(Czech Republic) Z Ondrášková	6	4	1
LL	(Spain) M Marrero	1	2
Q	(Croatia) J Kostanić	6	6
3	(Czech Republic) D Chládková	2	3
(Russia) V Dushevina	6	6
(Spain) A Medina Garrigues	3	6	5
(Hungary) M Czink	6	4	7

Quarterfinals
(Croatia) S Talaja	3	2
Q	(Croatia) J Kostanić	6	6
(Russia) V Dushevina	7	6
(Hungary) M Czink	5	0

Semifinals
Q	(Croatia) J Kostanić	7^{7}	6
(Russia) V Dushevina	6^{2}	4

=== Bottom half ===
First round
8	(Croatia) K Šprem	6	6
(Spain) C Torrens Valero	0	0
WC	(Sweden) S Arvidsson	5	4
(Germany) B Rittner	7	6
Q	(Czech Republic) S Kleinová	1	2
(Ukraine) T Perebiynis	6	6
(Italy) An Serra Zanetti	1	2
4	(Hungary) P Mandula	6	6
6	(Germany) A Barna	3	4
(Slovakia) Ľ Cervanová	6	6
(Czech Republic) K Koukalová	0	7	4
(Slovakia) H Nagyová	6	5	6
Q	(Hungary) R Kuti-Kis	6	4	1
(Switzerland) M Casanova	3	6	6
Q	(Czech Republic) J Hlaváčková	3	4
2	(Israel) A Pistolesi	6	6

Second round
8	(Croatia) K Šprem	6^{5}	7	6
(Germany) B Rittner	7^{7}	5	4
(Ukraine) T Perebiynis	2	2
4	(Hungary) P Mandula	6	6
(Slovakia) Ľ Cervanová	w/o
(Slovakia) H Nagyová
(Switzerland) M Casanova	2	3
2	(Israel) A Pistolesi	6	6

Quarterfinals
8	(Croatia) K Šprem	w/o
4	(Hungary) P Mandula
(Slovakia) Ľ Cervanová	3	0
2	(Israel) A Pistolesi	6	6

Semifinals
8	(Croatia) K Šprem	3	6	4
2	(Israel) A Pistolesi	6	1	6
