= 2003 Kremlin Cup – Women's singles =

Women's singles
- 2003 Kremlin Cup

Final
- Champion: (Russia) Anastasia Myskina
- Runner-up: (France) Amélie Mauresmo
- Score: 6–2, 6–4

Details
- Draw: 28
- Seeds: 8

Events
Singles	men	women
Doubles	men	women
- Kremlin Cup

Anastasia Myskina defeated Amélie Mauresmo in the final, 6–2, 6–4 to win the women's singles tennis title at the 2003 Kremlin Cup.

Magdalena Maleeva was the defending champion, but lost to Dinara Safina in the first round.

== Seeds ==
A champion seed is indicated in bold text while text in italics indicates the round in which that seed was eliminated. The top four seeds received a bye to the second round.

1. (United States) Jennifer Capriati (second round)
2. (France) Amélie Mauresmo (final)
3. (Russia) Elena Dementieva (semifinal)
4. **(Russia) Anastasia Myskina (champion)**
5. (Bulgaria) Magdalena Maleeva (first round)
6. (Russia) Nadia Petrova (first round)
7. (Russia) Vera Zvonareva (quarterfinals)
8. (United States) Meghann Shaughnessy (first round)

== Draw ==
Key

- Q = Qualifier
- WC = Wild card
- LL = Lucky loser
- Alt = Alternate
- ITF = ITF entry
- PR = Protected ranking
- SR = Special ranking
- SE = Special exempt
- JE = Junior exempt
- JR = Junior Accelerator Programme entrant
- CO = College Accelerator Programme entrant
- NG = Next Gen Accelerator Program entrant
- w/o = Walkover
- r = Retired
- d = Defaulted

=== Finals ===
Semifinals
(Israel) Anna Pistolesi	3	0
4	(Russia) **Anastasia Myskina**	**6**	**6**
3	(Russia) Elena Dementieva	4	1
2	(France) **Amélie Mauresmo**	**6**	**6**

Final
4	(Russia) **Anastasia Myskina**	**6**	**6**
2	(France) Amélie Mauresmo	2	4

=== Top half ===
First round
(Russia) **E Bovina**	**6**	**6**
(Switzerland) P Schnyder	4	2
(Russia) **S Kuznetsova**	**6**	**6**
Q	(Germany) M Weingärtner	2	4
(Israel) **A Pistolesi**	**6**	**6**
6	(Russia) N Petrova	3	3
(Spain) **M Serna**	2	**6**	**6**
(Italy) S Farina Elia	**6**	3	2
Q	(Slovenia) **T Pisnik**	**6**	**6**
(Russia) E Likhovtseva	4	3
(Greece) **E Daniilidou**	**7**	**6**
8	(United States) M Shaughnessy	5	3

Second round
1	(United States) J Capriati	**6**	4	6^{3}
(Russia) **E Bovina**	4	**6**	**7^{7}**
(Russia) S Kuznetsova	6^{5}	0
(Israel) **A Pistolesi**	**7^{7}**	**6**
4	(Russia) **A Myskina**	**6**	**6**
(Spain) M Serna	3	1
Q	(Slovenia) T Pisnik	3	**6**	4
(Greece) **E Daniilidou**	**6**	3	**6**

Quarterfinals
(Russia) E Bovina	4	4
(Israel) **A Pistolesi**	**6**	**6**
4	(Russia) **A Myskina**	**6**	**6**
(Greece) E Daniilidou	3	0

Semifinals
(Israel) A Pistolesi	2	0
4	(Russia) **A Myskina**	**6**	**6**

=== Bottom half ===
First round
5	(Bulgaria) M Maleeva	4	**6**	5
WC	(Russia) **D Safina**	**6**	3	**7**
(Italy) **F Schiavone**	2	**6**	**6**
(Russia) L Krasnoroutskaya	**6**	0	4
Q	(Ukraine) T Perebiynis	2	2
Q	(Croatia) **J Kostanić**	**6**	**6**
7	(Russia) **V Zvonareva**	4	**6**	**6**
(South Africa) A Coetzer	**6**	1	2
(United States) L Raymond	2	6^{4}
WC	(Russia) **V Dushevina**	**6**	**7^{7}**
(Federal Republic of Yugoslavia) J Dokić	3	1
(United States) **A Stevenson**	**6**	**6**

Second round
WC	(Russia) D Safina	5	6^{3}
(Italy) **F Schiavone**	**7**	**7^{7}**
Q	(Croatia) J Kostanić	2	3
3	(Russia) **E Dementieva**	**6**	**6**
7	(Russia) **V Zvonareva**	**6**	**6**
WC	(Russia) V Dushevina	2	1
(United States) A Stevenson	**6**	4	3
2	(France) **A Mauresmo**	3	**6**	**6**

Quarterfinals
(Italy) F Schiavone	1	1^{r}
3	(Russia) **E Dementieva**	**6**	2
7	(Russia) V Zvonareva	4	**6**	2
2	(France) **A Mauresmo**	**6**	3	**6**

Semifinals
3	(Russia) E Dementieva	4	1
2	(France) **A Mauresmo**	**6**	**6**

== Qualifying ==
=== Seeds ===
1. (Australia) Alicia Molik (second round)
2. (Colombia) Fabiola Zuluaga (qualifying competition)
3. (Slovenia) Maja Matevžič (first round)
4. (Slovenia) **Tina Pisnik (qualified)**
5. (Venezuela) ~~María Vento-Kabchi~~ (withdrew, still competing in Leipzig)
6. (Italy) ~~Rita Grande~~ (withdrew, still competing in Leipzig)
7. (Czech Republic) Klára Koukalová (second round)
8. (Germany) **Marlene Weingärtner (qualified)**
9. (Ukraine) **Tatiana Perebiynis (qualified)**
10. (Croatia) **Jelena Kostanić (qualified)**

=== Qualifiers ===
1. **(Germany) Marlene Weingärtner**
2. **(Ukraine) Tatiana Perebiynis**
3. **(Croatia) Jelena Kostanić**
4. **(Slovenia) Tina Pisnik**

=== Draw ===
==== First qualifier ====
First round
1	**(Australia) Alicia Molik**	**6**	**6**
(Canada) Sonya Jeyaseelan	4	1
(Russia) Gulnara Fattakhetdinova	2	2
**(Ukraine) Yuliya Beygelzimer**	**6**	**6**
Alt	(Russia) Ekaterina Bychkova	**7^{7}**	4	0
**(Russia) Maria Goloviznina**	6^{4}	**6**	**6**
(Russia) Galina Voskoboeva	6^{4}	3
8	**(Germany) Marlene Weingärtner**	**7^{7}**	**6**

Second round
1	(Australia) Alicia Molik	4	6^{4}
**(Ukraine) Yuliya Beygelzimer**	**6**	**7^{7}**
(Russia) Maria Goloviznina	**6**	4	5
8	**(Germany) Marlene Weingärtner**	4	**6**	**7**

Qualifying competition
(Ukraine) Yuliya Beygelzimer	3	1
8	**(Germany) Marlene Weingärtner**	**6**	**6**

==== Second qualifier ====
First round
2	**(Colombia) Fabiola Zuluaga**	**6**	**6**
(Ukraine) Yuliana Fedak	2	2
WC	(Russia) Elena Vesnina	1	5
**(Czech Republic) Michaela Paštiková**	**6**	**7**
WC	(Russia) Galina Fokina	**6**	6^{5}	2
**(Czech Republic) Renata Voráčová**	2	**7^{7}**	**6**
(Belarus) Tatiana Poutchek	3^{r}
9	**(Ukraine) Tatiana Perebiynis**	4

Second round
2	**(Colombia) Fabiola Zuluaga**	**6**	**6**
(Czech Republic) Michaela Paštiková	2	2
(Czech Republic) Renata Voráčová	3	4
9	**(Ukraine) Tatiana Perebiynis**	**6**	**6**

Qualifying competition
2	(Colombia) Fabiola Zuluaga	**6**	3	2
9	**(Ukraine) Tatiana Perebiynis**	3	**6**	**6**

==== Third qualifier ====
First round
3	(Slovenia) Maja Matevžič	3	**6**	3
**(Czech Republic) Iveta Benešová**	**6**	2	**6**
**(Russia) Anastasia Rodionova**	**6**	**6**
Alt	(Russia) Julia Vorobieva	3	2
**(Russia) Nina Bratchikova**	**6**	**6**
Alt	(Slovenia) Svetla Bozicnik	1	0
(Russia) Evgenia Kulikovskaya	5	5
10	**(Croatia) Jelena Kostanić**	**7**	**7**

Second round
(Czech Republic) Iveta Benešová	5	3
**(Russia) Anastasia Rodionova**	**7**	**6**
(Russia) Nina Bratchikova	3	1
10	**(Croatia) Jelena Kostanić**	**6**	**6**

Qualifying competition
(Russia) Anastasia Rodionova	**6**	4	3
10	**(Croatia) Jelena Kostanić**	4	**6**	**6**

==== Fourth qualifier ====
First round
4	**(Slovenia) Tina Pisnik**	5	**6**	**6**
(Germany) Vanessa Henke	**7**	3	1
(Slovakia) Janette Husárová	2	**6**	3
WC	**(Russia) Anna Chakvetadze**	**6**	3	**6**
WC	(Russia) Anna Bastrikova	5	2
**(Czech Republic) Eva Birnerová**	**7**	**6**
(Belarus) Nadejda Ostrovskaya	**6**	3	3
7	**(Czech Republic) Klára Koukalová**	4	**6**	**6**

Second round
4	**(Slovenia) Tina Pisnik**	5	**6**	**6**
WC	(Russia) Anna Chakvetadze	**7**	1	3
**(Czech Republic) Eva Birnerová**	**7**	**6**
7	(Czech Republic) Klára Koukalová	5	4

Qualifying competition
4	**(Slovenia) Tina Pisnik**	**6**	4	**7**
(Czech Republic) Eva Birnerová	2	**6**	5
