= 2001 in tennis =

This page covers all the important events in the sport of tennis in 2001. Primarily, it provides the results of notable tournaments throughout the year on both the ATP and WTA Tours, the Davis Cup, and the Fed Cup.

In 2001, Martina Hingis finished the year as the fourth-ranked female tennis player, the first time in five years she was not ranked No. 1.

== ITF ==
=== Grand Slam events ===
Event	Championship	Champion	Finalist	Score in the final
Men's singles	Australian Open	(United States) Andre Agassi	(France) Arnaud Clément	6–4, 6–2, 6–2
Men's singles	French Open	(Brazil) Gustavo Kuerten	(Spain) Àlex Corretja	6–7^{(3–7)}, 7–5, 6–2, 6–0
Men's singles	Wimbledon	(Croatia) Goran Ivanišević	(Australia) Patrick Rafter	6–3, 3–6, 6–3, 2–6, 9–7
Men's singles	US Open	(Australia) Lleyton Hewitt	(United States) Pete Sampras	7–6^{(7–4)}, 6–1, 6–1

Event	Championship	Champion	Finalist	Score in the final
Women's singles	Australian Open	(United States) Jennifer Capriati	(Switzerland) Martina Hingis	6–4, 6–3
Women's singles	French Open	(United States) Jennifer Capriati	(Belgium) Kim Clijsters	1–6, 6–4, 12–10
Women's singles	Wimbledon	(United States) Venus Williams	(Belgium) Justine Henin	6–1, 3–6, 6–0
Women's singles	US Open	(United States) Venus Williams	(United States) Serena Williams	6–2, 6–4

Event	Championship	Champions	Finalists	Score in the final
Men's doubles	Australian Open	(United States) Jonas Björkman (Australia) Todd Woodbridge	(Zimbabwe) Byron Black (Germany) David Prinosil	6–1, 5–7, 6–4, 6–4
Men's doubles	French Open	(India) Mahesh Bhupathi (India) Leander Paes	(Czech Republic) Petr Pála (Czech Republic) Pavel Vízner	7–6^{(7–5)}, 6–3
Men's doubles	Wimbledon	(United States) Donald Johnson (United States) Jared Palmer	(Czech Republic) Jiří Novák (Czech Republic) David Rikl	6–4, 4–6, 6–3, 7–6^{(8–6)}
Men's doubles	US Open	(Zimbabwe) Wayne Black (Zimbabwe) Kevin Ullyett	(United States) Donald Johnson (United States) Jared Palmer	7–6^{(11–9)}, 2–6, 6–3

Event	Championship	Champions	Finalists	Score in the final
Women's doubles	Australian Open	(United States) Serena Williams (United States) Venus Williams	(United States) Lindsay Davenport (United States) Corina Morariu	6–2, 4–6, 6–4
Women's doubles	French Open	(Spain) Virginia Ruano (Argentina) Paola Suárez	(Serbia and Montenegro) Jelena Dokić (Spain) Conchita Martínez	6–2, 6–1
Women's doubles	Wimbledon	(United States) Lisa Raymond (Australia) Rennae Stubbs	(Belgium) Kim Clijsters (Japan) Ai Sugiyama	6–4, 6–3
Women's doubles	US Open	(United States) Lisa Raymond (Australia) Rennae Stubbs	(United States) Kimberly Po-Messerli (France) Nathalie Tauziat	6–2, 5–7, 7–5

Event	Championship	Champions	Finalists	Score in the final
Mixed doubles	Australian Open	(South Africa) Ellis Ferreira (United States) Corina Morariu	(Australia) Joshua Eagle (Austria) Barbara Schett	6–1, 6–3
Mixed doubles	French Open	(Spain) Tomás Carbonell (Spain) Virginia Ruano	(Brazil) Jaime Oncins (Argentina) Paola Suárez	7–5, 6–3
Mixed doubles	Wimbledon	(Czech Republic) Leoš Friedl (Slovakia) Daniela Hantuchová	(United States) Mike Bryan (South Africa) Liezel Huber	4–6, 6–3, 6–2
Mixed doubles	US Open	(Australia) Rennae Stubbs (Australia) Todd Woodbridge	(India) Leander Paes (United States) Lisa Raymond	6–4, 5–7, [11–9]

=== Davis Cup ===
2001 Davis Cup Champions
(France)
France
9th title

Australia
2
Rod Laver Arena, Melbourne, Australia
30 November - 2 December 2001
Grass (outdoors)

France
3

			1	2	3	4	5
1	(Australia) (France)	Lleyton Hewitt; Nicolas Escudé	6; 4	3; 6	6; 3	3; 6	4; 6
2	(Australia) (France)	Patrick Rafter; Sébastien Grosjean	6; 3	7^{8} 6^{6}	7; 5
3	(Australia) (France)	Lleyton Hewitt / Patrick Rafter; Cédric Pioline / Fabrice Santoro	6; 2	3; 6	6^{5} 7^{7}	1; 6
4	(Australia) (France)	Lleyton Hewitt; Sébastien Grosjean	6; 3	6; 2	6; 3
5	(Australia) (France)	Wayne Arthurs; Nicolas Escudé	6^{4} 7^{7}	7^{7} 6^{5}	3; 6	3; 6

=== Fed Cup ===
2001 Fed Cup Champions
(Belgium)
Belgium
1st title

Russia
1
Parque Ferial Juan Carlos I, Madrid, Spain
11 November
Clay (indoors)

Belgium
2

			1	2	3
1	(Russia) (Belgium)	Nadia Petrova; Justine Henin	0; 6	3; 6
2	(Russia) (Belgium)	Elena Dementieva; Kim Clijsters	0; 6	4; 6
3	(Russia) (Belgium)	Elena Likhovtseva / Nadia Petrova; Els Callens / Laurence Courtois	7; 5	7^{7} 6^{2}

=== Hopman Cup ===
2001 Hopman Cup Champions
(Switzerland)
Switzerland
2nd title

Switzerland
2
Burswood Entertainment Complex, Perth, Australia
30 December 2000 – 6 January 2001
Hard (indoors)

United States
1

			1	2	3
1	(Switzerland) (United States)	Martina Hingis; Monica Seles	7; 5	6; 4
2	(Switzerland) (United States)	Roger Federer; Jan-Michael Gambill	6; 4	6; 3
3	(Switzerland) (United States)	Martina Hingis / Roger Federer; Monica Seles / Jan-Michael Gambill	6; 2	4; 6	6; 7

=== ITF Tour ===
- Men's circuit
- Women's circuit

=== Other tournaments ===
- Mediterranean Games

== ATP/WTA ==
=== Year-end Championships ===
==== Singles ====
	Championship	Champions	Finalists	Score in the final
Men	Sydney	(Australia) Lleyton Hewitt	(France) Sébastien Grosjean	6–3, 6–3, 6–4
Women	Munich	(United States) Serena Williams	(United States) Lindsay Davenport	walkover

==== Doubles ====
	Championship	Champions	Finalists	Score in the final
Men	Bangalore	(South Africa) Ellis Ferreira (United States) Rick Leach	(Czech Republic) Petr Pála (Czech Republic) Pavel Vízner	6–7^{(6–8)}, 7–6^{(7–2)}, 6–4, 6–4
Women	Munich	(United States) Lisa Raymond (Australia) Rennae Stubbs	(Zimbabwe) Cara Black (Russia) Elena Likhovtseva	7–5, 3–6, 6–3

=== Masters Series/Tier I ===
==== Singles ====
	Championship	Champions	Finalists	Score in the final
Men	Indian Wells	(United States) Andre Agassi	(United States) Pete Sampras	7–6^{(7–5)}, 7–5, 6–1
Men	Miami	(United States) Andre Agassi	(United States) Jan-Michael Gambill	7–6^{(7–4)}, 6–1, 6–0
Men	Monte Carlo	(Brazil) Gustavo Kuerten	(Morocco) Hicham Arazi	6–3, 6–2, 6–4
Men	Rome	(Spain) Juan Carlos Ferrero	(Brazil) Gustavo Kuerten	3–6, 6–1, 2–6, 6–4, 6–2
Men	Hamburg	(Spain) Albert Portas	(Spain) Juan Carlos Ferrero	4–6, 6–2, 0–6, 7–6^{(7–5)}, 7–5
Men	Montreal	(Romania) Andrei Pavel	(Australia) Patrick Rafter	7–6^{(7–3)}, 2–6, 6–3
Men	Cincinnati	(Brazil) Gustavo Kuerten	(Australia) Patrick Rafter	6–1, 6–3
Men	Stuttgart	(Germany) Tommy Haas	(Belarus) Max Mirnyi	6–2, 6–2, 6–2
Men	Paris	(France) Sébastien Grosjean	(Russia) Yevgeny Kafelnikov	7–6^{(7–3)}, 6–1, 6–7^{(5–7)}, 6–4
Women	Tokyo	(United States) Lindsay Davenport	(Switzerland) Martina Hingis	6–7^{(4–7)}, 6–4, 6–2
Women	Indian Wells	(United States) Serena Williams	(Belgium) Kim Clijsters	4–6, 6–4, 6–2
Women	Miami	(United States) Venus Williams	(United States) Jennifer Capriati	4–6, 6–1, 7–6^{(7–4)}
Women	Charleston	(United States) Jennifer Capriati	(Switzerland) Martina Hingis	6–0, 4–6, 6–4
Women	Berlin	(France) Amélie Mauresmo	(United States) Jennifer Capriati	6–4, 2–6, 6–3
Women	Rome	(Serbia and Montenegro) Jelena Dokić	(France) Amélie Mauresmo	7–6^{(7–3)}, 6–1
Women	Toronto	(United States) Serena Williams	(United States) Jennifer Capriati	6–1, 6–7^{(7–9)}, 6–3
Women	Moscow	(Serbia and Montenegro) Jelena Dokić	(Russia) Elena Dementieva	6–3, 6–3
Women	Zürich	(United States) Lindsay Davenport	(Federal Republic of Yugoslavia) Jelena Dokić	6–3, 6–1

==== Doubles ====
	Championship	Champions	Finalists	Score in the final
Men	Indian Wells	(South Africa) Wayne Ferreira (Russia) Yevgeny Kafelnikov	(Sweden) Jonas Björkman (Australia) Todd Woodbridge	6–2, 7–5
Men	Miami	(Czech Republic) Jiří Novák (Czech Republic) David Rikl	(Sweden) Jonas Björkman (Australia) Todd Woodbridge	7–5, 7–6^{(7–3)}
Men	Monte Carlo	(Sweden) Jonas Björkman (Australia) Todd Woodbridge	(Australia) Joshua Eagle (Australia) Andrew Florent	3–6, 6–4, 6–2
Men	Rome	(South Africa) Wayne Ferreira (Russia) Yevgeny Kafelnikov	(Canada) Daniel Nestor (Australia) Sandon Stolle	6–4, 7–6^{(8–6)}
Men	Hamburg	(Sweden) Jonas Björkman (Australia) Todd Woodbridge	(Canada) Daniel Nestor (Australia) Sandon Stolle	7–6^{(7–2)}, 3–6, 6–3
Men	Montreal	(Czech Republic) Jiří Novák (Czech Republic) David Rikl	(United States) Donald Johnson (United States) Jared Palmer	6–4, 3–6, 6–3
Men	Cincinnati	(India) Mahesh Bhupathi (India) Leander Paes	(Czech Republic) Martin Damm (Germany) David Prinosil	7–6^{(7–3)}, 6–3
Men	Stuttgart	(Belarus) Max Mirnyi (Australia) Sandon Stolle	(South Africa) Ellis Ferreira (United States) Jeff Tarango	7–6^{(7–0)}, 7–6^{(7–4)}
Men	Paris	(South Africa) Ellis Ferreira (United States) Rick Leach	(India) Mahesh Bhupathi (India) Leander Paes	3–6, 6–4, 6–3
Women	Tokyo	(United States) Lisa Raymond (Australia) Rennae Stubbs	(Russia) Anna Kournikova (Uzbekistan) Iroda Tulyaganova	7–6^{(7–5)}, 2–6, 7–6^{(8–6)}
Women	Indian Wells	(United States) Nicole Arendt (Japan) Ai Sugiyama	(Spain) Virginia Ruano (Argentina) Paola Suárez	6–4, 6–4
Women	Miami	(Spain) Arantxa Sánchez (France) Nathalie Tauziat	(United States) Lisa Raymond (Australia) Rennae Stubbs	6–0, 6–4
Women	Charleston	(United States) Lisa Raymond (Australia) Rennae Stubbs	(Spain) Virginia Ruano (Argentina) Paola Suárez	5–7, 7–6^{(7–5)}, 6–3
Women	Berlin	(Belgium) Els Callens (United States) Meghann Shaughnessy	(Zimbabwe) Cara Black (Russia) Elena Likhovtseva	6–4, 6–3
Women	Rome	(Zimbabwe) Cara Black (Russia) Elena Likhovtseva	(Argentina) Paola Suárez (Argentina) Patricia Tarabini	6–1, 6–1
Women	Toronto	(United States) Kimberly Po-Messerli (Australia) Nicole Pratt	(Slovenia) Tina Križan (Slovenia) Katarina Srebotnik	6–3, 6–1
Women	Moscow	(Switzerland) Martina Hingis (Russia) Anna Kournikova	(Russia) Elena Dementieva (Russia) Lina Krasnoroutskaya	7–6^{(7–1)}, 6–3
Women	Zürich	(United States) Lindsay Davenport (United States) Lisa Raymond	(France) Sandrine Testud (Italy) Roberta Vinci	6–3, 2–6, 6–2

=== ATP Challenger tournaments ===
- 2001 calendar

== Tennis Hall of Fame ==
Class	Inductees	Category
Class of 2001	(Czechoslovakia) / (United States) Ivan Lendl	Player
Class of 2001	(Australia) Mervyn Rose	Player

== See also ==
- 2001 in sports
