= 2001 WTA Tier I Series =

Women's professional tennis tour

Details
- Duration: January 29 – October 21
- Edition: 12th
- Tournaments: 9

Achievements (singles)
- Most titles: (United States) Lindsay Davenport (Serbia and Montenegro) Jelena Dokić (United States) Serena Williams (2)
- Most finals: (United States) Jennifer Capriati (4)

The WTA Tier I events are part of the elite tour for professional women's tennis organised by the WTA called the WTA Tour.

== Tournaments ==
Tournament	Country	Location	Surface	Date	Prize money
Toray Pan Pacific Open	Japan	Tokyo	Carpet (i)	Jan 29 – Feb 4	$1,188,000
Pacific Life Open	United States	Indian Wells	Hard	Mar 5 – 18	$2,000,000
Ericsson Open	United States	Key Biscayne	Hard	Mar 19 – Apr 1	$2,720,000
Family Circle Cup	United States	Charleston	Clay (green)	Apr 16 – 22	$1,200,000
Eurocard German Open	Germany	Berlin	Clay	May 7 – 13	$1,185,000
Italian Open	Italy	Rome	Clay	May 14 – 20	$1,200,000
Rogers AT&T Cup	Canada	Toronto	Hard	Aug 13 – 19	$1,200,000
Kremlin Cup	Russia	Moscow	Carpet (i)	Oct 1 – 7	$1,185,000
Swisscom Challenge	Switzerland	Zürich	Carpet (i)	Oct 15 – 21	$1,185,000

== Results ==
* First-time champion

Tournament	Singles champions	Runners-up	Score	Doubles champions	Runners-up	Score
Tokyo Singles – Doubles	(United States) Lindsay Davenport	(Switzerland) Martina Hingis	6–7^{(4–7)}, 6–4, 6–2	(United States) Lisa Raymond (Australia) Rennae Stubbs	(Russia) Anna Kournikova (Uzbekistan) Iroda Tulyaganova	7–6^{(7–5)}, 2–6, 7–6^{(8–6)}
Indian Wells Singles – Doubles	(United States) Serena Williams	(Belgium) Kim Clijsters	4–6, 6–4, 6–2	(United States) Nicole Arendt (Japan) Ai Sugiyama	(Spain) Virginia Ruano Pascual (Argentina) Paola Suárez	6–4, 6–4
Miami Singles – Doubles	(United States) Venus Williams	(United States) Jennifer Capriati	4–6, 6–1, 7–6^{(7–4)}	(Spain) Arantxa Sánchez Vicario (France) Nathalie Tauziat	(United States) Lisa Raymond (Australia) Rennae Stubbs	6–0, 6–4
Charleston Singles – Doubles	(United States) Jennifer Capriati	(Switzerland) Martina Hingis	6–0, 4–6, 6–4	(United States) Lisa Raymond (Australia) Rennae Stubbs	(Spain) Virginia Ruano Pascual (Argentina) Paola Suárez	5–7, 7–6^{(7–5)}, 6–3
Berlin Singles – Doubles	(France) Amélie Mauresmo*	(United States) Jennifer Capriati	6–4, 2–6, 6–3	(Belgium) Els Callens* (United States) Meghann Shaughnessy*	(Zimbabwe) Cara Black (Russia) Elena Likhovtseva	6–4, 6–3
Rome Singles – Doubles	(Serbia and Montenegro) Jelena Dokić*	(France) Amélie Mauresmo	7–6^{(7–3)}, 6–1	(Zimbabwe) Cara Black*	(Argentina) Paola Suárez (Argentina) Patricia Tarabini	6–1, 6–1
Rome Singles – Doubles	(Serbia and Montenegro) Jelena Dokić*	(France) Amélie Mauresmo	7–6^{(7–3)}, 6–1	(Russia) Elena Likhovtseva	(Argentina) Paola Suárez (Argentina) Patricia Tarabini	6–1, 6–1
Toronto Singles – Doubles	(United States) Serena Williams	(United States) Jennifer Capriati	6–1, 6–7^{(7–9)}, 6–3	(United States) Kimberly Po-Messerli* (Australia) Nicole Pratt*	(Slovenia) Tina Križan (Slovenia) Katarina Srebotnik	6–3, 6–1
Moscow Singles – Doubles	(Serbia and Montenegro) Jelena Dokić	(Russia) Elena Dementieva	6–3, 6–3	(Switzerland) Martina Hingis (Russia) Anna Kournikova	(Russia) Elena Dementieva (Russia) Lina Krasnoroutskaya	7–6^{(7–1)}, 6–3
Zürich Singles – Doubles	(United States) Lindsay Davenport	(Federal Republic of Yugoslavia) Jelena Dokić	6–3, 6–1	(United States) Lindsay Davenport (United States) Lisa Raymond	(France) Sandrine Testud (Italy) Roberta Vinci	6–3, 2–6, 6–2

== See also ==
- WTA Tier I events
- 2001 WTA Tour
- 2001 Tennis Masters Series
- 2001 ATP Tour
