= 2001 Tennis Masters Series =

Men's professional tennis tour

Details
- Duration: March 8 – November 5
- Edition: 12th
- Tournaments: 9

Achievements (singles)
- Most titles: (United States) Andre Agassi (Brazil) Gustavo Kuerten (2)
- Most finals: (Brazil) Gustavo Kuerten (3)

The table below shows the 2001 Tennis Masters Series schedule.

The ATP Masters Series are part of the elite tour for professional men's tennis organised by the Association of Tennis Professionals.

== Results ==
* First-time champion

Masters	Singles champions	Runners-up	Score	Doubles champions	Runners-up	Score
Indian Wells Singles – Doubles	(United States) Andre Agassi	(United States) Pete Sampras	7–6^{(7–5)}, 7–5, 6–1	(South Africa) Wayne Ferreira (Russia) Yevgeny Kafelnikov	(Sweden) Jonas Björkman (Australia) Todd Woodbridge	6–2, 7–5
Miami Singles – Doubles	(United States) Andre Agassi	(United States) Jan-Michael Gambill	7–6^{(7–4)}, 6–1, 6–0	(Czech Republic) Jiří Novák (Czech Republic) David Rikl	(Sweden) Jonas Björkman (Australia) Todd Woodbridge	7–5, 7–6
Monte Carlo Singles – Doubles	(Brazil) Gustavo Kuerten	(Morocco) Hicham Arazi	6–3, 6–2, 6–4	(Sweden) Jonas Björkman (Australia) Todd Woodbridge	(Australia) Joshua Eagle (Australia) Andrew Florent	3–6, 6–4, 6–2
Rome Singles – Doubles	(Spain) Juan Carlos Ferrero*	(Brazil) Gustavo Kuerten	3–6, 6–1, 2–6, 6–4, 6–2	(South Africa) Wayne Ferreira (Russia) Yevgeny Kafelnikov	(Canada) Daniel Nestor (Australia) Sandon Stolle	6–4, 7–6
Hamburg Singles – Doubles	(Spain) Albert Portas*	(Spain) Juan Carlos Ferrero	4–6, 6–2, 0–6, 7–6^{(7–5)}, 7–5	(Sweden) Jonas Björkman (Australia) Todd Woodbridge	(Canada) Daniel Nestor (Australia) Sandon Stolle	7–6, 3–6, 6–3
Montreal Singles – Doubles	(Romania) Andrei Pavel*	(Australia) Patrick Rafter	7–6^{(7–3)}, 2–6, 6–3	(Czech Republic) Jiří Novák (Czech Republic) David Rikl	(United States) Donald Johnson (United States) Jared Palmer	6–4, 3–6, 6–3
Cincinnati Singles – Doubles	(Brazil) Gustavo Kuerten	(Australia) Patrick Rafter	6–1, 6–3	(India) Mahesh Bhupathi (India) Leander Paes	(Czech Republic) Martin Damm (Germany) David Prinosil	7–6, 6–3
Stuttgart Singles – Doubles	(Germany) Tommy Haas*	(Belarus) Max Mirnyi	6–2, 6–2, 6–2	(Belarus) Max Mirnyi (Australia) Sandon Stolle	(South Africa) Ellis Ferreira (United States) Jeff Tarango	7–6, 6–3
Paris Singles – Doubles	(France) Sébastien Grosjean*	(Russia) Yevgeny Kafelnikov	7–6^{(7–3)}, 6–1, 6–7^{(5–7)}, 6–4	(South Africa) Ellis Ferreira (United States) Rick Leach	(India) Mahesh Bhupathi (India) Leander Paes	5–7, 7–6^{(7–2)}, 6–4

== Titles Champions ==
=== Singles ===
#	Player	IN	MI	MO	HA	RO	CA	CI	ST	PA	#	Winning span
	(United States) Andre Agassi	1	4	-	-	-	3	2	-	2	12	1990–2001 (12)
	(United States) Pete Sampras	2	3	-	-	1	-	3	-	2	11	1992–2000 (9)
	(Austria) Thomas Muster	-	1	3	-	3	-	-	1	-	8	1990–1997 (8)
	(United States) Michael Chang	3	1	-	-	-	1	2	-	-	7	1990–1997 (8)
	(United States) Jim Courier	2	1	-	-	2	-	-	-	-	5	1991–1993 (3)
	(Germany) Boris Becker	-	-	-	-	-	-	-	4	1	5	1990–1996 (7)
	(Brazil) Gustavo Kuerten	-	-	2	1	1	-	1	-	-	5	1999–2001 (3)
	(Chile) Marcelo Ríos	1	1	1	1	1	-	-	-	-	5	1997–1999 (3)
	(Sweden) Stefan Edberg	1	-	-	1	-	-	1	-	1	4	1990–1992 (3)
	(Ukraine) Andrei Medvedev	-	-	1	3	-	-	-	-	-	4	1994–1997 (4)
	(Sweden) Thomas Enqvist	-	-	-	-	-	-	1	1	1	3	1996–2000 (5)
	(Spain) Sergi Bruguera	-	-	2	-	-	-	-	-	-	2	1991–1993 (3)
	(Russia) Andrei Chesnokov	-	-	1	-	-	1	-	-	-	2	1990–1991 (2)
	(Spain) Àlex Corretja	1	-	-	-	1	-	-	-	-	2	1997–2000 (4)
	(South Africa) Wayne Ferreira	-	-	-	-	-	1	-	1	-	2	1996–2000 (5)
	(France) Guy Forget	-	-	-	-	-	-	1	-	1	2	1991
	(Croatia) Goran Ivanišević	-	-	-	-	-	-	-	1	1	2	1992–1993 (2)
	(Netherlands) Richard Krajicek	-	1	-	-	-	-	-	1	-	2	1998–1999 (2)
	(Australia) Patrick Rafter	-	-	-	-	-	1	1	-	-	2	1998
	(Russia) Marat Safin	-	-	-	-	-	1	-	-	1	2	2000
	(Germany) Michael Stich	-	-	-	1	-	-	-	1	-	2	1993
	(Spain) Juan Aguilera	-	-	-	1	-	-	-	-	-	1	1990
	(Spain) Albert Costa	-	-	-	1	-	-	-	-	-	1	1998
	(Spain) Roberto Carretero	-	-	-	1	-	-	-	-	-	1	1996
	(Spain) Juan Carlos Ferrero	-	-	-	-	1	-	-	-	-	1	2001
	(France) Sébastien Grosjean	-	-	-	-	-	-	-	-	1	1	2001
	(Germany) Tommy Haas	-	-	-	-	-	-	-	1	-	1	2001
	(Sweden) Thomas Johansson	-	-	-	-	-	1	-	-	-	1	1999
	(Czech Republic) Petr Korda	-	-	-	-	-	-	-	1	-	1	1997
	(Spain) Carlos Moyá	-	-	1	-	-	1	-	-	-	1	1998
	(Sweden) Magnus Norman	-	-	-	-	1	-	-	-	-	1	2000
	(Czech Republic) Karel Nováček	-	-	-	1	-	-	-	-	-	1	1991
	(Romania) Andrei Pavel	-	-	-	-	-	1	-	-	-	1	2001
	(Sweden) Mikael Pernfors	-	-	-	-	-	1	-	-	-	1	1993
	(Australia) Mark Philippoussis	1	-	-	-	-	-	-	-	-	1	1999
	(France) Cédric Pioline	-	-	1	-	-	-	-	-	-	1	2000
	(Spain) Albert Portas	-	-	-	-	1	-	-	-	-	1	2001
	(United Kingdom) Greg Rusedski	-	-	-	-	-	-	-	-	1	1	1998
	(Spain) Emilio Sánchez	-	-	-	-	1	-	-	-	-	1	1991
	(United States) Chris Woodruff	-	-	-	-	-	1	-	-	-	1	1997
#	Player	IN	MI	MO	HA	RO	CA	CI	ST	PA	#	Winning span

== See also ==
- ATP Tour Masters 1000
- 2001 ATP Tour
- 2001 WTA Tier I Series
- 2001 WTA Tour
