= 2002 Swisscom Challenge – Singles =

Singles
- 2002 Swisscom Challenge

Final
- Champion: (Switzerland) Patty Schnyder
- Runner-up: (United States) Lindsay Davenport
- Score: 6–7^{(5–7)}, 7–6^{(10–8)}, 6–3

Details
- Draw: 28 (3WC/4Q/1LL)
- Seeds: 8

Events
Singles	Doubles
- Zurich Open

Patty Schnyder defeated defending champion Lindsay Davenport in the final, 6–7^{(5–7)}, 7–6^{(10–8)}, 6–3 to win the singles tennis title at the 2002 Zurich Open. It was her first title of the season, and the eighth title of her career.

== Seeds ==
The first four seeds received a bye into the second round.

1. (United States) Jennifer Capriati (second round)
2. (United States) Lindsay Davenport (final)
3. (France) ~~Amélie Mauresmo~~ (withdrew due to an inflammation in her right knee)
4. (Belgium) Justine Henin (semifinals)
5. (Federal Republic of Yugoslavia) Jelena Dokic (second round)
6. (Belgium) Kim Clijsters (quarterfinals)
7. (Slovakia) Daniela Hantuchová (quarterfinals)
8. (Russia) Anastasia Myskina (second round)

== Draw ==
Key

- Q = Qualifier
- WC = Wild card
- LL = Lucky loser
- Alt = Alternate
- ITF = ITF entry
- PR = Protected ranking
- SR = Special ranking
- SE = Special exempt
- JE = Junior exempt
- JR = Junior Accelerator Programme entrant
- CO = College Accelerator Programme entrant
- NG = Next Gen Accelerator Program entrant
- w/o = Walkover
- r = Retired
- d = Defaulted

=== Finals ===
Semifinals
(Spain) Conchita Martínez	0	3
(Switzerland) Patty Schnyder	6	6
4	(Belgium) Justine Henin	6^{2}	6^{5}
2	(United States) Lindsay Davenport	7^{7}	7^{7}

Final
(Switzerland) Patty Schnyder	6^{5}	7^{10}	6
2	(United States) Lindsay Davenport	7^{7}	6^{8}	3

=== Top half ===
First round
(Spain) C Martínez	6	6
WC	(Switzerland) M Casanova	4	3
(Japan) A Sugiyama	3	4
Q	(United States) A Stevenson	6	6
(Croatia) I Majoli	1	4
5	(Federal Republic of Yugoslavia) J Dokic	6	6
(Switzerland) P Schnyder	6	6
Q	(Czech Republic) D Chládková	3	2
Q	(Germany) A Barna	2	5
(Russia) E Dementieva	6	7
Q	(Slovakia) J Husárová	6^{5}	1
7	(Slovakia) D Hantuchová	7^{7}	6

Second round
1	(United States) J Capriati	0	3
(Spain) C Martínez	6	6
Q	(United States) A Stevenson	7^{8}	4	7
5	(Federal Republic of Yugoslavia) J Dokic	6^{6}	6	5
LL	(Russia) E Bovina	6	4	3
(Switzerland) P Schnyder	2	6	6
(Russia) E Dementieva	6	6^{4}	6^{6}
7	(Slovakia) D Hantuchová	3	7^{7}	7^{8}

Quarterfinals
(Spain) C Martínez	7	7
Q	(United States) A Stevenson	5	5
(Switzerland) P Schnyder	6^{5}	6	7^{7}
7	(Slovakia) D Hantuchová	7^{7}	3	6^{5}

Semifinals
(Spain) C Martínez	0	3
(Switzerland) P Schnyder	6	6

=== Bottom half ===
First round
8	(Russia) A Myskina	6	4	6
WC	(United States) L Raymond	4	6	2
WC	(Switzerland) MG Mikaelian	7	3	7
(Bulgaria) M Maleeva	5	6	5
(United States) C Rubin	3	3
(Israel) A Smashnova	6	6
6	(Belgium) K Clijsters	7	6
(Czech Republic) D Bedáňová	5	2
(Italy) S Farina Elia	5	2
(South Africa) A Coetzer	7	6
(Russia) T Panova	6	6
(Luxembourg) A Kremer	4	2

Second round
8	(Russia) A Myskina	6	4	5
WC	(Switzerland) MG Mikaelian	0	6	7
(Israel) A Smashnova	3	1
4	(Belgium) J Henin	6	6
6	(Belgium) K Clijsters	6	6
(South Africa) A Coetzer	1	1
(Russia) T Panova	2	2
2	(United States) L Davenport	6	6

Quarterfinals
WC	(Switzerland) MG Mikaelian	5	2
4	(Belgium) J Henin	7	6
6	(Belgium) K Clijsters	3	6^{5}
2	(United States) L Davenport	6	7^{7}

Semifinals
4	(Belgium) J Henin	6^{2}	6^{5}
2	(United States) L Davenport	7^{7}	7^{7}

== Qualifying ==
=== Qualifying seeds ===
1. (Greece) Eleni Daniilidou (first round)
2. (Russia) Elena Bovina (qualifying competition, Lucky loser)
3. (n/a)
4. (n/a)
5. (United States) Alexandra Stevenson (qualified)
6. (Slovakia) Janette Husárová (qualified)
7. (Slovenia) Katarina Srebotnik (qualifying competition)
8. (Russia) Vera Zvonareva (qualifying competition)
9. (Switzerland) Emmanuelle Gagliardi (second round)

=== Qualifiers ===
1. (Germany) Anca Barna
2. (Slovakia) Janette Husárová
3. (Czech Republic) Denisa Chládková
4. (United States) Alexandra Stevenson

=== Lucky loser ===
1. (Russia) Elena Bovina

=== Qualifying draw ===
==== First qualifier ====
First round
1	(Greece) Eleni Daniilidou	7^{8}	0	4
(Sweden) Åsa Svensson	6^{6}	6	6
(Germany) Anca Barna	6	6
Alt	(Germany) Nina Dübbers	3	1
(Hungary) Zsófia Gubacsi	6	3	3
(Germany) Gréta Arn	2	6	6
(Russia) Evgenia Kulikovskaya	0	3
8	(Russia) Vera Zvonareva	6	6

Second round
(Sweden) Åsa Svensson	3	5
(Germany) Anca Barna	6	7
(Germany) Gréta Arn	6	5	3
8	(Russia) Vera Zvonareva	4	7	6

Qualifying competition
(Germany) Anca Barna	4	7	7
8	(Russia) Vera Zvonareva	6	5	5

==== Second qualifier ====
First round
2	(Russia) Elena Bovina	6	6
(Croatia) Jelena Kostanić	4	3
(Netherlands) Seda Noorlander	7^{7}	7^{16}
WC	(Switzerland) Aliénor Tricerri	6^{5}	6^{14}
WC	(Bosnia and Herzegovina) Sandra Martinović	3	3
(Czech Republic) Libuše Průšová	6	6
(Ukraine) Tatiana Perebiynis	6	6^{3}	1
6	(Slovakia) Janette Husárová	4	7^{7}	6

Second round
2	(Russia) Elena Bovina	6	2	6
(Netherlands) Seda Noorlander	3	6	3
(Czech Republic) Libuše Průšová	4	6	0
6	(Slovakia) Janette Husárová	6	1	6

Qualifying competition
2	(Russia) Elena Bovina	5	4
6	(Slovakia) Janette Husárová	7	6

==== Third qualifier ====
First round
9	(Switzerland) Emmanuelle Gagliardi	6	6
WC	(Switzerland) Daniela Casanova	4	1
(Czech Republic) Denisa Chládková	6	6
(Czech Republic) Zuzana Ondrášková	4	2
WC	(Switzerland) Serena Bergomi	3	1
(Canada) Maureen Drake	6	6
(Germany) Jana Kandarr	0	3
7	(Slovenia) Katarina Srebotnik	6	6

Second round
9	(Switzerland) Emmanuelle Gagliardi	1	2
(Czech Republic) Denisa Chládková	6	6
(Canada) Maureen Drake	6^{4}	6^{6}
7	(Slovenia) Katarina Srebotnik	7^{7}	7^{8}

Qualifying competition
(Czech Republic) Denisa Chládková	6	6
7	(Slovenia) Katarina Srebotnik	3	0

==== Fourth qualifier ====
First round
Alt	(Germany) Vanessa Henke	6	6
(Hungary) Anikó Kapros	2	3
(South Africa) Liezel Huber	6	6
(Italy) Roberta Vinci	4	3
(Germany) Angelika Rösch	6	4	7
(United States) Jill Craybas	2	6	5
(Bulgaria) Maria Geznenge	2	1
5	(United States) Alexandra Stevenson	6	6

Second round
Alt	(Germany) Vanessa Henke	6	3	3
(South Africa) Liezel Huber	3	6	6
(Germany) Angelika Rösch	1	6	2
5	(United States) Alexandra Stevenson	6	3	6

Qualifying competition
(South Africa) Liezel Huber	7	2	0
5	(United States) Alexandra Stevenson	5	6	6
