= 2001 Swisscom Challenge =

- Date: 14–21 October
- Edition: 18th
- Category: WTA Tier I
- Draw: 28S / 16D
- Prize money: USD 1,185,000
- Surface: Carpet, indoor
- Location: Zürich, Switzerland
- Venue: Schluefweg

Champions

Singles
- (United States) Lindsay Davenport

Doubles
- (United States) Lindsay Davenport / (United States) Lisa Raymond
← 2000 ·	Zurich Open	· 2002 →

The 2001 Swisscom Challenge was a women's tennis tournament played on indoor carpet courts. It was the 18th edition of the event and was part of the Tier I Series of the 2001 WTA Tour. It took place at the Schluefweg in Zürich, Switzerland, from 14 through 21 October 2001. Third-seeded Lindsay Davenport won the singles title.

== Finals ==
=== Singles ===
- (United States) Lindsay Davenport defeated (Federal Republic of Yugoslavia) Jelena Dokic, 6–3, 6–1

It was the 6th title of the year for Davenport and the 36th title in her singles career.

=== Doubles ===
- (United States) Lindsay Davenport / (United States) Lisa Raymond defeated (France) Sandrine Testud / (Italy) Roberta Vinci, 6–3, 2–6, 6–2

It was the 31st title for Davenport and the 26th title for Raymond in their respective doubles careers. It was also the 2nd title for the pair during the season.

== Points and prize money ==
=== Point distribution ===
Event	W	F	SF	QF	Round of 16	Round of 32	Q	Q3	Q2	Q1
Singles	260	182	117	65	36	1	?	?	?	?
Doubles	260	182	117	65	1	—	?	—	—	—

=== Prize money ===
Event	W	F	SF	QF	Round of 16	Round of 32	Q3	Q2	Q1
Singles	$175,000	$94,000	$50,000	$27,000	$14,400	$7,700	$4,100	$2,200	$1,200
Doubles *	$55,000	$29,550	$15,800	$8,450	$4,500	—	—	—	—

_{* per team}

== Singles main draw entrants ==
=== Seeds ===
Country	Player	Rank^{1}	Seed
SUI	~~Martina Hingis~~	1	1
USA	Jennifer Capriati	2	2
USA	Lindsay Davenport	3	3
(Federal Republic of Yugoslavia) YUG	Jelena Dokic	10	4
FRA	Nathalie Tauziat	11	5
USA	Meghann Shaughnessy	12	6
RUS	Elena Dementieva	13	7
ITA	Silvia Farina Elia	14	8
FRA	Sandrine Testud	15	9

^{1} Rankings as of 8 October 2001.

=== Other entrants ===
The following players received wildcards into the singles main draw:

- (Russia) Lina Krasnoroutskaya
- (Russia) Nadia Petrova
- (Switzerland) Patty Schnyder

The following players received entry from the qualifying draw:

- (Slovakia) Daniela Hantuchová
- (Croatia) Iva Majoli
- (Switzerland) Marie-Gaïané Mikaelian
- (Russia) Tatiana Panova

The following players received entry as lucky losers:

- (Slovakia) Janette Husárová
- (United States) Alexandra Stevenson

=== Withdrawals ===
Before the tournament

- (Switzerland) Martina Hingis (ankle injury)

== Doubles main draw entrants ==
=== Seeds ===
Country	Player	Country	Player	Rank^{1}	Seed
USA	Kimberly Po-Messerli	FRA	Nathalie Tauziat	11	1
SUI	~~Martina Hingis~~	RUS	~~Anna Kournikova~~	Withdrew	2
ARG	Patricia Tarabini	NED	Caroline Vis	56	3
USA	Lindsay Davenport	USA	Lisa Raymond	61	4
USA	Martina Navratilova	ESP	Arantxa Sánchez Vicario	62	5

^{1} Rankings as of 8 October 2001.

=== Other entrants ===
The following pair received wildcards into the doubles main draw:

- (Russia) Elena Dementieva / (Russia) Lina Krasnoroutskaya

The following pair received entry from the qualifying draw:

- (Sweden) Åsa Carlsson / (Argentina) María Emilia Salerni

The following pair received entry as lucky losers:

- (Russia) Nadia Petrova / (Uzbekistan) Iroda Tulyaganova

=== Withdrawals ===
Before the tournament

- (Switzerland) Martina Hingis (ankle injury) → replaced by Petrova/Tulyaganova
