= 2002 Swisscom Challenge – Doubles =

Doubles
- 2002 Swisscom Challenge

Final
- Champions: (Russia) Elena Bovina (Belgium) Justine Henin
- Runners-up: (Federal Republic of Yugoslavia) Jelena Dokic (Russia) Nadia Petrova
- Score: 6–2, 7–6^{(7–2)}

Details
- Draw: 16 (1WC/1Q)
- Seeds: 4

Events
Singles	Doubles
← 2001 ·	Zurich Open	· 2003 →

Lindsay Davenport and Lisa Raymond were the defending champions, but Raymond did not compete this year. Davenport teamed up with Chanda Rubin and lost in quarterfinals to tournament winners Elena Bovina and Justine Henin.

Bovina and Henin won the title by defeating Jelena Dokic and Nadia Petrova 6–2, 7–6^{(7–2)} in the final. It was the 6th title for Bovina and the 2nd title for Henin in their respective doubles careers.

This tournament saw an unusual event, as all seeded pairs were eliminated in their first match.

== Seeds ==
1. (Spain) Virginia Ruano Pascual / (Argentina) Paola Suárez (first round)
2. (Russia) Elena Dementieva / (Slovakia) Janette Husárová (first round)
3. (Spain) Conchita Martínez / (Japan) Ai Sugiyama (first round)
4. (United States) Nicole Arendt / (South Africa) Liezel Huber (first round)

== Draw ==
=== Key ===
- Q = Qualifier
- WC = Wild card
- LL = Lucky loser
- Alt = Alternate
- SE = Special exempt
- PR = Protected ranking
- ITF = ITF entry
- JE = Junior exempt
- w/o = Walkover
- r = Retired
- d = Defaulted
- SR = Special ranking

=== Draw ===
First round
1	(Spain) V Ruano Pascual (Argentina) P Suárez	4	4
(United States) L Davenport (United States) C Rubin	6	6
(Argentina) P Tarabini (Netherlands) C Vis	1	2
(Russia) E Bovina (Belgium) J Henin	6	6
4	(United States) N Arendt (South Africa) L Huber	6	6^{3}	3
(Belgium) K Clijsters (Slovakia) D Hantuchová	1	7^{7}	6
Q	(Russia) E Kulikovskaya (Ukraine) T Perebiynis	6	6
(Slovenia) T Križan (Slovenia) K Srebotnik	4	4
(Switzerland) P Schnyder (Sweden) Å Svensson	4	6	4
(Chinese Taipei) J Lee (Indonesia) W Prakusya	6	4	6
WC	(Switzerland) M Casanova (Switzerland) E Gagliardi	2	6	7^{8}
3	(Spain) C Martínez (Japan) A Sugiyama	6	1	6^{6}
(Federal Republic of Yugoslavia) J Dokic (Russia) N Petrova	6	7
(Italy) S Farina Elia (Italy) R Vinci	4	5
(United States) K Po-Messerli (Belarus) N Zvereva	4	6	6
2	(Russia) E Dementieva (Slovakia) J Husárová	6	3	4

Quarterfinals
(United States) L Davenport (United States) C Rubin	6^{6}	5
(Russia) E Bovina (Belgium) J Henin	7^{8}	7
(Belgium) K Clijsters (Slovakia) D Hantuchová	5	6	6
Q	(Russia) E Kulikovskaya (Ukraine) T Perebiynis	7	3	4
(Chinese Taipei) J Lee (Indonesia) W Prakusya	6	7
WC	(Switzerland) M Casanova (Switzerland) E Gagliardi	4	5
(Federal Republic of Yugoslavia) J Dokic (Russia) N Petrova	6	6
(United States) K Po-Messerli (Belarus) N Zvereva	4	3

Semifinals
(Russia) E Bovina (Belgium) J Henin	6	6
(Belgium) K Clijsters (Slovakia) D Hantuchová	2	1
(Chinese Taipei) J Lee (Indonesia) W Prakusya	1	2
(Federal Republic of Yugoslavia) J Dokic (Russia) N Petrova	6	6

Final
(Russia) E Bovina (Belgium) J Henin	6	7^{7}
(Federal Republic of Yugoslavia) J Dokic (Russia) N Petrova	2	6^{2}

== Qualifying ==
=== Qualifying seeds ===
1. (Russia) Evgenia Kulikovskaya / (Ukraine) Tatiana Perebiynis (qualified)
2. (Germany) Vanessa Henke / (Germany) Angelika Rösch (qualifying competition)

=== Qualifiers ===
1. (Russia) Evgenia Kulikovskaya / (Ukraine) Tatiana Perebiynis

=== Qualifying draw ===
First round
1	(Russia) Evgenia Kulikovskaya (Ukraine) Tatiana Perebiynis	8
WC	(Switzerland) Serena Bergomi (Switzerland) Daniela Casanova	4
(Germany) Adriana Barna (Germany) Anca Barna	8^{6}
2	(Germany) Vanessa Henke (Germany) Angelika Rösch	9^{8}

Qualifying competition
1	(Russia) Evgenia Kulikovskaya (Ukraine) Tatiana Perebiynis	6	6
2	(Germany) Vanessa Henke (Germany) Angelika Rösch	2	3
