= 2002 Swisscom Challenge =

- Date: 13 – 20 October
- Edition: 19th
- Category: Tier I Series
- Draw: 28S / 16D
- Prize money: USD1,224,000
- Surface: Hard (indoor)
- Location: Zürich, Switzerland
- Venue: Schluefweg

Champions

Singles
- (Switzerland) Patty Schnyder

Doubles
- (Russia) Elena Bovina / (Belgium) Justine Henin
- Zurich Open

The 2002 Swisscom Challenge was a women's tennis tournament played on indoor hard courts. It was the 19th edition of the event known as the Zurich Open, and was part of the Tier I Series of the 2002 WTA Tour. It took place at the Schluefweg in Zürich, Switzerland, from 13 October through 20 October 2002. Unseeded Patty Schnyder won the singles title and Elena Bovina and Justine Henin claimed the doubles title.

== Finals ==
=== Singles ===
(Switzerland) Patty Schnyder defeated (United States) Lindsay Davenport, 6–7^{(5–7)}, 7–6^{(10–8)}, 6–3

=== Doubles ===
(Russia) Elena Bovina / (Belgium) Justine Henin defeated (Federal Republic of Yugoslavia) Jelena Dokic / (Russia) Nadia Petrova, 6–2, 7–6^{(7–2)}
