= 2001 Cincinnati Masters =

Tennis tournament

- Date: August 6–12
- Edition: 100th
- Category: Tennis Masters Series
- Draw: 64S / 32D
- Prize money: $2,450,000
- Surface: Hard / outdoor
- Location: Mason, United States
- Venue: Lindner Family Tennis Center

Champions

Singles
- (Brazil) Gustavo Kuerten

Doubles
- (India) Mahesh Bhupathi / (India) Leander Paes
- Cincinnati Masters

The 2001 Cincinnati Masters was a tennis tournament played on outdoor hard courts. It was the 100th edition of the Cincinnati Masters and was part of the Tennis Masters Series of the 2001 ATP Tour. It took place at the Lindner Family Tennis Center in Mason, Ohio in the United States from August 6 through August 12, 2001.

The tournament had previously appeared as part of Tier III of the WTA Tour but no event was held from 1989 to 2003.

== Finals ==
=== Singles ===
(Brazil) Gustavo Kuerten defeated (Australia) Patrick Rafter 6–1, 6–3

- It was Kuerten's 7th title of the year and the 24th of his career. It was his 2nd Masters title of the year and his 5th overall.

=== Doubles ===
(India) Mahesh Bhupathi / (India) Leander Paes defeated (Czech Republic) Martin Damm / (Germany) David Prinosil 7–6^{(7–3)}, 6–3

- It was Bhupathi's 4th title of the year and the 21st of his career. It was Paes' 4th title of the year and the 24th of his career.
