= Tomás Carbonell =

Tomás Carbonell may refer to:

- Tomás Carbonell (bishop) (1621–1692), Spanish friar of the Dominican order
- Tomás Carbonell (tennis) (born 1968), Spanish tennis player
- Tomy Carbonell (born 2005), Spanish footballer
