= 2001 Swisscom Challenge – Doubles =

Doubles
- 2001 Swisscom Challenge

Final
- Champions: (United States) Lindsay Davenport (United States) Lisa Raymond
- Runners-up: (France) Sandrine Testud (Italy) Roberta Vinci
- Score: 6–3, 2–6, 6–2

Details
- Draw: 16
- Seeds: 4

Events
Singles	Doubles
← 2000 ·	Swisscom Challenge	· 2002 →

Martina Hingis and Anna Kournikova were the defending champions, but were forced to withdraw as Hingis suffered an ankle injury.

Lindsay Davenport and Lisa Raymond won the title by defeating Sandrine Testud and Roberta Vinci 6–3, 2–6, 6–2 in the final.

== Seeds ==
1. (United States) Kimberly Po-Messerli / (France) Nathalie Tauziat (semifinals)
2. (Switzerland) ~~Martina Hingis~~ / (Russia) ~~Anna Kournikova~~ (withdrew due to an ankle injury on Hingis)
3. (Argentina) Patricia Tarabini / (Netherlands) Caroline Vis (first round)
4. (United States) Lindsay Davenport / (United States) Lisa Raymond (champions)
5. (United States) Martina Navratilova / (Spain) Arantxa Sánchez Vicario (quarterfinals)

== Draw ==
Key

- Q = Qualifier
- WC = Wild card
- LL = Lucky loser
- Alt = Alternate
- ITF = ITF entry
- PR = Protected ranking
- SR = Special ranking
- SE = Special exempt
- JE = Junior exempt
- JR = Junior Accelerator Programme entrant
- CO = College Accelerator Programme entrant
- NG = Next Gen Accelerator Program entrant
- w/o = Walkover
- r = Retired
- d = Defaulted

=== Draw ===
First round
1	(United States) K Po-Messerli (France) N Tauziat	6	6
(Slovakia) K Habšudová (France) A-G Sidot	2	1
WC	(Russia) E Dementieva (Russia) L Krasnoroutskaya	4	4
(South Africa) A Coetzer (United States) L McNeil	6	6
5	(United States) M Navratilova (Spain) A Sánchez Vicario	1	6	6
LL	(Russia) N Petrova (Uzbekistan) I Tulyaganova	6	3	2
(France) S Testud (Italy) R Vinci	3	6	7^{7}
(Argentina) L Montalvo (Spain) M Serna	6	4	6^{2}
(Belgium) E Callens (United States) C Rubin	3	6	6
(Croatia) I Majoli (Austria) B Schett	6	4	2
(United States) J Capriati (United States) M Shaughnessy	5	6^{4}
4	(United States) L Davenport (United States) L Raymond	7	7^{7}
Q	(Sweden) Å Carlsson (Argentina) ME Salerni	7^{7}	6
(Slovakia) D Hantuchová (Netherlands) M Oremans	6^{1}	1
(Italy) T Garbin (Slovakia) J Husárová	6	6
3	(Argentina) P Tarabini (Netherlands) C Vis	2	2

Quarterfinals
1	(United States) K Po-Messerli (France) N Tauziat	6	6
(South Africa) A Coetzer (United States) L McNeil	3	3
5	(United States) M Navratilova (Spain) A Sánchez Vicario	3	6	1
(France) S Testud (Italy) R Vinci	6	4	6
(Belgium) E Callens (United States) C Rubin	1	2
4	(United States) L Davenport (United States) L Raymond	6	6
Q	(Sweden) Å Carlsson (Argentina) ME Salerni	6	6
(Italy) T Garbin (Slovakia) J Husárová	4	4

Semifinals
1	(United States) K Po-Messerli (France) N Tauziat	6	4	2
(France) S Testud (Italy) R Vinci	3	6	6
4	(United States) L Davenport (United States) L Raymond	6^{7}	6	6
Q	(Sweden) Å Carlsson (Argentina) ME Salerni	7^{9}	1	1

Final
(France) S Testud (Italy) R Vinci	3	6	2
4	(United States) L Davenport (United States) L Raymond	6	2	6
