= 2001 Eurocard Ladies German Open – Doubles =

Doubles
- 2001 Eurocard Ladies German Open

Final
- Champions: (Belgium) Els Callens (United States) Meghann Shaughnessy
- Runners-up: (Zimbabwe) Cara Black (Russia) Elena Likhovtseva
- Score: 6–4, 6–3

Details
- Draw: 28
- Seeds: 8

Events
| Singles | Doubles |
| ← 2000 · | WTA German Open | · 2002 → |

Conchita Martínez and Arantxa Sánchez Vicario were the defending champions but they competed with different partners that year, Martínez with Jelena Dokić and Sánchez Vicario with Martina Navratilova.

Navratilova and Sánchez Vicario lost in the second round to Lubomira Bacheva and Åsa Carlsson.

Dokić and Martínez lost in the semifinals to Cara Black and Elena Likhovtseva.

Els Callens and Meghann Shaughnessy won in the final 6–4, 6–3 against Black and Likhovtseva.

== Seeds ==
Champion seeds are indicated in bold text while text in italics indicates the round in which those seeds were eliminated. The top four seeded teams received byes into the second round.

1. (Spain) Virginia Ruano Pascual / (Argentina) Paola Suárez (quarterfinals)
2. (United States) Corina Morariu / (Japan) Ai Sugiyama (withdrew)
3. (Zimbabwe) Cara Black / (Russia) Elena Likhovtseva (final)
4. (Belgium) **Els Callens** / (United States) **Meghann Shaughnessy (champions)**
5. (United States) Nicole Arendt / (Netherlands) Caroline Vis (second round)
6. (France) Alexandra Fusai / (Italy) Rita Grande (second round)
7. (United States) Martina Navratilova / (Spain) Arantxa Sánchez Vicario (second round)
8. (France) Nathalie Dechy / (Argentina) Patricia Tarabini (first round)

== Draw ==
=== Key ===
- Q = Qualifier
- WC = Wild card
- LL = Lucky loser
- Alt = Alternate
- SE = Special exempt
- PR = Protected ranking
- ITF = ITF entry
- JE = Junior exempt
- w/o = Walkover
- r = Retired
- d = Defaulted
- SR = Special ranking

=== Final ===
Final

4
- (Belgium) **Els Callens**
- (United States) **Meghann Shaughnessy**
**6**
**6**

3
- (Zimbabwe) Cara Black
- (Russia) Elena Likhovtseva
4
3

=== Top half ===
First round

Second round

Quarterfinals

Semifinals

1
- (Spain) **V Ruano Pascual**
- (Argentina) **P Suárez**
**6**
**6**

- (Italy) G Casoni
- (Netherlands) S Noorlander
3
3

- (Germany) B Lamade
- (Switzerland) P Schnyder
3
3

- (Germany) **B Lamade**
- (Switzerland) **P Schnyder**
**6**
**6**

1
- (Spain) V Ruano Pascual
- (Argentina) P Suárez
4
1

WC
- (Germany) G Arn
- (Germany) A Glass
1
3

- (Slovakia) **K Habšudová**
- (Ukraine) **E Tatarkova**
**6**
**6**

- (Slovakia) **K Habšudová**
- (Ukraine) **E Tatarkova**
**6**
**6**

- (Slovakia) **K Habšudová**
- (Ukraine) **E Tatarkova**
**7^{7}**
3
**6**

- (Croatia) I Majoli
- (Austria) B Schett
**6**
1
3

6
- (France) A Fusai
- (Italy) R Grande
6^{1}
**6**
3

6
- (France) **A Fusai**
- (Italy) **R Grande**
3
**6**
**6**

- (Slovakia) K Habšudová
- (Ukraine) E Tatarkova
**6**
2
4

4
- (Belgium) **E Callens**
- (United States) **M Shaughnessy**
4
**6**
**6**

4
- (Belgium) **E Callens**
- (United States) **M Shaughnessy**
**6**

- (Italy) **T Garbin**
- (Slovakia) **J Husárová**
**6**
**6**

- (Italy) T Garbin
- (Slovakia) J Husárová
1
r

- (Czech Republic) K Hrdličková
- (Germany) B Rittner
4
1

4
- (Belgium) **E Callens**
- (United States) **M Shaughnessy**
**6**
**6**

WC
- (South Africa) **K Grant**
- (Germany) **M Weingärtner**
3
**6**
**6**

WC
- (South Africa) K Grant
- (Germany) M Weingärtner
1
1

- (United States) J Capriati
- (Spain) M Serna
**6**
4
4

WC
- (South Africa) **K Grant**
- (Germany) **M Weingärtner**
1
**7**
**6**

- (Belarus) T Poutchek
- (Germany) E Wagner
**6**
4
6^{5}

5
- (United States) N Arendt
- (Netherlands) C Vis
**6**
5
4

5
- (United States) **N Arendt**
- (Netherlands) **C Vis**
4
**6**
**7^{7}**

=== Bottom half ===
First round

Second round

Quarterfinals

Semifinals

7
- (United States) **M Navratilova**
- (Spain) **A Sánchez Vicario**
**6**
**6**

- (Spain) G Riera
- (Argentina) P Tarabini
3
3

7
- (United States) M Navratilova
- (Spain) A Sánchez Vicario
3
3

- (Bulgaria) **L Bacheva**
- (Sweden) **Å Carlsson**
**6**
**6**

- (Bulgaria) **L Bacheva**
- (Sweden) **Å Carlsson**
**6**
**6**

- (United States) D Graham
- (Austria) S Plischke
1
1

- (Bulgaria) L Bacheva
- (Sweden) Å Carlsson
0
**6**
6^{7}

(France) É Loit
(France) A-G Sidot
4
3

3
- (Zimbabwe) **C Black**
- (Russia) **E Likhovtseva**
**6**
2
**7^{9}**

- (France) **A Mauresmo**
- (France) **S Testud**
**6**
**6**

- (France) A Mauresmo
- (France) S Testud
**6**
3
4

3
- (Zimbabwe) **C Black**
- (Russia) **E Likhovtseva**
0
**6**
**6**

3
- (Zimbabwe) **C Black**
- (Russia) **E Likhovtseva**
**7**
**6**

8
- (France) N Dechy
- (France) N Tauziat
**6**
2
6^{6}

(Federal Republic of Yugoslavia) J Dokić
(Spain) C Martínez
5
2

- (South Africa) **L Huber**
- (Argentina) **L Montalvo**
4
**6**
**7^{8}**

- (South Africa) L Huber
- (Argentina) L Montalvo
4
2

- (Slovenia) **T Križan**
- (Slovenia) **K Srebotnik**
**6**
**6**

- (Slovenia) **T Križan**
- (Slovenia) **K Srebotnik**
**6**
**6**

- (United States) L Osterloh
- (United States) K Schlukebir
3
1

- (Slovenia) T Križan
- (Slovenia) K Srebotnik
**7**
5
3

- (Romania) R Dragomir Ilie
- (Italy) S Farina Elia
3
**7^{7}**
4

(Federal Republic of Yugoslavia) **J Dokić**
(Spain) **C Martínez**
5
**7**
**6**

(Federal Republic of Yugoslavia) **J Dokić**
(Spain) **C Martínez**
**6**
6^{4}
**6**

(Federal Republic of Yugoslavia) **J Dokić**
(Spain) **C Martínez**
**6**
**6**

ALT
- (United States) J Hopkins
- (Russia) A Myskina
4
3
