= 2001 Cincinnati Masters – Singles =

Singles
- 2001 Cincinnati Masters

Final
- Champion: (Brazil) Gustavo Kuerten
- Runner-up: (Australia) Patrick Rafter
- Score: 6–1, 6–3

Details
- Draw: 64
- Seeds: 16

Events
Singles	Doubles
- Cincinnati Masters

Gustavo Kuerten defeated Patrick Rafter in the final, 6–1, 6–3 to win the singles tennis title at the 2001 Cincinnati Masters.

Thomas Enqvist was the defending champion, but lost in the first round to Nicolas Kiefer.

== Seeds ==
1. (Brazil) Gustavo Kuerten (champion)
2. (United States) Andre Agassi (first round)
3. (Russia) Marat Safin (first round)
4. (Spain) Juan Carlos Ferrero (second round)
5. (Australia) Lleyton Hewitt (semifinals)
6. (Russia) Yevgeny Kafelnikov (quarterfinals)
7. (United Kingdom) Tim Henman (semifinals)
8. (Australia) Patrick Rafter (final)
9. (United States) Pete Sampras (second round)
10. (France) Arnaud Clément (second round)
11. (Sweden) Thomas Enqvist (first round)
12. (Sweden) Thomas Johansson (first round)
13. (Spain) Carlos Moyá (second round)
14. (Croatia) Goran Ivanišević (third round)
15. (South Africa) Wayne Ferreira (first round)
16. (Slovakia) Dominik Hrbatý (first round)

== Draw ==
Key

- Q = Qualifier
- WC = Wild card
- LL = Lucky loser
- Alt = Alternate
- ITF = ITF entry
- PR = Protected ranking
- SR = Special ranking
- SE = Special exempt
- JE = Junior exempt
- JR = Junior Accelerator Programme entrant
- CO = College Accelerator Programme entrant
- NG = Next Gen Accelerator Program entrant
- w/o = Walkover
- r = Retired
- d = Defaulted

=== Finals ===
Quarterfinals
1	(Brazil) Gustavo Kuerten	6	3	6
6	(Russia) Yevgeny Kafelnikov	4	6	4
(United States) Jan-Michael Gambill	6	2	2
7	(United Kingdom) Tim Henman	4	6	6
5	(Australia) Lleyton Hewitt	7^{7}	6^{3}	6
Q	(Croatia) Ivan Ljubičić	6^{3}	7^{7}	4
8	(Australia) Patrick Rafter	5	7^{7}	6
(United Kingdom) Greg Rusedski	7	6^{5}	4

Semifinals
1	(Brazil) Gustavo Kuerten	6	1	7^{7}
7	(United Kingdom) Tim Henman	2	6	6^{4}
5	(Australia) Lleyton Hewitt	4	3
8	(Australia) Patrick Rafter	6	6

Final
1	(Brazil) Gustavo Kuerten	6	6
8	(Australia) Patrick Rafter	1	3

=== Top half ===
==== Section 1 ====
First round
1	(Brazil) G Kuerten	7^{7}	6
(United States) A Roddick	6^{3}	1
Q	(United States) C Woodruff	4	2
(Germany) T Haas	6	6
(Spain) F Vicente	4	2
(France) N Escudé	6	6
(Spain) F Clavet	3	6	6^{5}
14/WC	(Croatia) G Ivanišević	6	3	7^{7}
9	(United States) P Sampras	6	6
(Ecuador) N Lapentti	3	2
WC	(United States) M Russell	6	3	2
(Spain) A Martín	4	6	6
(France) J Golmard	3	6^{5}
(France) F Santoro	6	7^{7}
(Sweden) A Vinciguerra	6^{4}	1
6	(Russia) Y Kafelnikov	7^{7}	6

Second round
1	(Brazil) G Kuerten	7^{7}	7^{10}
(Germany) T Haas	6^{4}	6^{8}
(France) N Escudé	3	4
14/WC	(Croatia) G Ivanišević	6	6
9	(United States) P Sampras	4	4
(Spain) A Martín	6	6
(France) F Santoro	1	4
6	(Russia) Y Kafelnikov	6	6

Third round
1	(Brazil) G Kuerten	6	6
14/WC	(Croatia) G Ivanišević	2	1
(Spain) A Martín	2	6	4
6	(Russia) Y Kafelnikov	6	2	6

Quarterfinals
1	(Brazil) G Kuerten	6	3	6
6	(Russia) Y Kafelnikov	4	6	4

==== Section 2 ====
First round
3	(Russia) M Safin	3	3
(Argentina) G Cañas	6	6
(United States) M Chang	6	6
(Belarus) V Voltchkov	1	3
Q	(United States) J Morrison	4	6	2
(Czech Republic) J Novák	6	3	6
(United States) J-M Gambill	6	6
16	(Slovakia) D Hrbatý	3	1
11	(Sweden) T Enqvist	4	0
(Germany) N Kiefer	6	6
(United States) T Martin	2	6	6
Q	(United States) C Mamiit	6	3	3
(South Korea) H-T Lee	6	6
WC	(United States) T Dent	4	4
(Czech Republic) M Tabara	4	2
7	(United Kingdom) T Henman	6	6

Second round
(Argentina) G Cañas	5	7	6
(United States) M Chang	7	5	2
(Czech Republic) J Novák	6^{2}	2
(United States) J-M Gambill	7^{7}	6
(Germany) N Kiefer	6	4	6
(United States) T Martin	1	6	2
(South Korea) H-T Lee	3	3
7	(United Kingdom) T Henman	6	6

Third round
(Argentina) G Cañas	3	4
(United States) J-M Gambill	6	6
(Germany) N Kiefer	5	3
7	(United Kingdom) T Henman	7	6

Quarterfinals
(United States) J-M Gambill	6	2	2
7	(United Kingdom) T Henman	4	6	6

=== Bottom half ===
==== Section 3 ====
First round
5	(Australia) L Hewitt	6	6
(Sweden) M Norman	4	1
Q	(Zimbabwe) W Black	3	2
(Czech Republic) B Ulihrach	6	6
(Spain) A Costa	3	4
(Belarus) M Mirnyi	6	6
(Romania) A Pavel	6	6
12	(Sweden) T Johansson	3	2
13	(Spain) C Moyá	6	6
Q	(Spain) F Mantilla	3	3
Q	(Croatia) I Ljubičić	6	6
(Argentina) F Squillari	2	0
(Morocco) H Arazi	7	6
(Argentina) G Coria	5	2
(Australia) W Arthurs	4	4
4	(Spain) J C Ferrero	6	6

Second round
5	(Australia) L Hewitt	6	5	6
(Czech Republic) B Ulihrach	2	7	2
(Belarus) M Mirnyi	6	6
(Romania) A Pavel	1	1
13	(Spain) C Moyá	6^{5}	5
Q	(Croatia) I Ljubičić	7^{7}	7
(Morocco) H Arazi	6^{1}	6	6
4	(Spain) J C Ferrero	7^{7}	4	4

Third round
5	(Australia) L Hewitt	1	6	7^{7}
(Belarus) M Mirnyi	6	4	6^{5}
Q	(Croatia) I Ljubičić	6	6
(Morocco) H Arazi	2	3

Quarterfinals
5	(Australia) L Hewitt	7^{7}	6^{3}	6
Q	(Croatia) I Ljubičić	6^{3}	7^{7}	4

==== Section 4 ====
First round
8	(Australia) P Rafter	7	6
(Spain) A Portas	5	3
(Sweden) J Björkman	3	3
(Belgium) X Malisse	6	6
Q	(France) J Boutter	6^{5}	0
WC	(United States) J Blake	7^{7}	6
(Spain) Á Calatrava	6	4	6^{4}
10	(France) A Clément	4	6	7^{7}
15	(South Africa) W Ferreira	4	4
(Netherlands) S Schalken	6	6
(Israel) H Levy	4	1
Q	(Austria) S Koubek	6	6
(Germany) D Prinosil	6	6^{6}	1
(United Kingdom) G Rusedski	3	7^{8}	6
(Argentina) G Gaudio	6	7^{7}
2	(United States) A Agassi	4	6^{3}

Second round
8	(Australia) P Rafter	6	6
(Belgium) X Malisse	0	3
WC	(United States) J Blake	7	6
10	(France) A Clément	5	4
(Netherlands) S Schalken	1	6^{5}
Q	(Austria) S Koubek	6	7^{7}
(United Kingdom) G Rusedski	7^{7}	7^{7}
(Argentina) G Gaudio	6^{2}	6^{1}

Third round
8	(Australia) P Rafter	7^{9}	6
WC	(United States) J Blake	6^{7}	2
Q	(Austria) S Koubek	3	3
(United Kingdom) G Rusedski	6	6

Quarterfinals
8	(Australia) P Rafter	5	7^{7}	6
(United Kingdom) G Rusedski	7	6^{5}	4
