= 2001 Cincinnati Masters – Doubles =

Doubles
- 2001 Cincinnati Masters

Final
- Champions: (India) Mahesh Bhupathi (India) Leander Paes
- Runners-up: (Czech Republic) Martin Damm (Germany) David Prinosil
- Score: 7–6^{(7–3)}, 6–3

Events
Singles	Doubles
← 2000 ·	Cincinnati Masters	· 2002 →

Todd Woodbridge and Mark Woodforde were the defending champions but only Woodbridge competed that year with Jonas Björkman.

Björkman and Woodbridge lost in the semifinals to Mahesh Bhupathi and Leander Paes.

Bhupathi and Paes won in the final 7–6^{(7–3)}, 6–3 against Martin Damm and David Prinosil.

== Seeds ==
1. (Sweden) Jonas Björkman / (Australia) Todd Woodbridge (semifinals)
2. (United States) Donald Johnson / (United States) Jared Palmer (second round)
3. (Canada) Daniel Nestor / (Australia) Sandon Stolle (first round)
4. (Czech Republic) Jiří Novák / (Czech Republic) David Rikl (quarterfinals)
5. (Czech Republic) Petr Pála / (Czech Republic) Pavel Vízner (first round)
6. (India) Mahesh Bhupathi / (India) Leander Paes (champions)
7. (South Africa) Wayne Ferreira / (Russia) Yevgeny Kafelnikov (second round)
8. (South Africa) Ellis Ferreira / (United States) Rick Leach (second round)

== Draw ==
=== Key ===
- Q = Qualifier
- WC = Wild card
- LL = Lucky loser
- Alt = Alternate
- ITF = ITF entry
- PR = Protected ranking
- SR = Special ranking
- SE = Special exempt
- JE = Junior exempt
- JR = Junior Accelerator Programme entrant
- CO = College Accelerator Programme entrant
- NG = Next Gen Accelerator Program entrant
- w/o = Walkover
- r = Retired
- d = Defaulted

=== Final ===
Semifinals
1	(Sweden) Jonas Björkman (Australia) Todd Woodbridge	6^{5}	6^{2}
6	(India) Mahesh Bhupathi (India) Leander Paes	7^{7}	7^{7}
(Czech Republic) Martin Damm (Germany) David Prinosil	2	7^{9}	7
(Ecuador) Nicolás Lapentti (United States) Jeff Tarango	6	6^{7}	5

Final
6	(India) Mahesh Bhupathi (India) Leander Paes	7^{7}	6
(Czech Republic) Martin Damm (Germany) David Prinosil	6^{3}	3

=== Top half ===
First round
1	(Sweden) J Björkman (Australia) T Woodbridge	6	6
WC	(Germany) B Becker (Croatia) G Ivanišević	3	2
WC	(Germany) T Haas (Belarus) M Mirnyi	6	5	6
(South Africa) C Haggard (Belgium) T Vanhoudt	1	7	4
WC	(Germany) N Kiefer (Russia) M Safin	3	6^{2}
(Australia) A Florent (Australia) L Hewitt	6	7^{7}
WC	(United States) M Fish (United States) C Woodruff	4	2
7	(South Africa) W Ferreira (Russia) Y Kafelnikov	6	6
4	(Czech Republic) J Novák (Czech Republic) D Rikl	6	6
(The Bahamas) M Knowles (United States) B MacPhie	4	4
(South Africa) D Adams (Russia) A Olhovskiy	6	4	4
(Zimbabwe) B Black (Australia) M Hill	3	6	6
(United States) J Gimelstob (United States) A O'Brien	7^{8}	6
(Canada) S Lareau (Netherlands) S Schalken	6^{6}	3
WC	(United States) L Jensen (United States) M Jensen	7^{7}	0	1
6	(India) M Bhupathi (India) L Paes	6^{3}	6	6

Second round
1	(Sweden) J Björkman (Australia) T Woodbridge	6	6
WC	(Germany) T Haas (Belarus) M Mirnyi	3	1
(Australia) A Florent (Australia) L Hewitt	w/o
7	(South Africa) W Ferreira (Russia) Y Kafelnikov
4	(Czech Republic) J Novák (Czech Republic) D Rikl	6	6
(Zimbabwe) B Black (Australia) M Hill	4	4
(United States) J Gimelstob (United States) A O'Brien	4	6	3
6	(India) M Bhupathi (India) L Paes	6	3	6

Quarterfinals
1	(Sweden) J Björkman (Australia) T Woodbridge	w/o
(Australia) A Florent (Australia) L Hewitt
4	(Czech Republic) J Novák (Czech Republic) D Rikl	6	6^{12}	2
6	(India) M Bhupathi (India) L Paes	3	7^{14}	6

Semifinals
1	(Sweden) J Björkman (Australia) T Woodbridge	6^{5}	6^{2}
6	(India) M Bhupathi (India) L Paes	7^{7}	7^{7}

=== Bottom half ===
First round
5	(Czech Republic) P Pála (Czech Republic) P Vízner	6	4	2
(Czech Republic) M Damm (Germany) D Prinosil	0	6	6
(Australia) W Arthurs (Australia) A Kratzmann	4	6	6
(Slovakia) D Hrbatý (United States) S Humphries	6	1	4
WC	(United States) J Blake (United States) T Martin	7^{7}	6
(Zimbabwe) W Black (Zimbabwe) K Ullyett	6^{2}	3
(United States) B Bryan (United States) M Bryan	2	7^{9}	6
3	(Canada) D Nestor (Australia) S Stolle	6	6^{7}	2
8	(South Africa) E Ferreira (United States) R Leach	6^{4}	6	6
WC	(United States) R Ginepri (United States) J Morrison	7^{7}	3	3
WC	(United States) J-M Gambill (United States) A Roddick	6	6^{4}	3
(Argentina) M García (Czech Republic) C Suk	4	7^{7}	6
(Ecuador) N Lapentti (United States) J Tarango	6^{11}	7	6
(Czech Republic) T Cibulec (Czech Republic) L Friedl	7^{13}	5	2
(Argentina) P Albano (Argentina) L Arnold	1	6	6^{2}
2	(United States) D Johnson (United States) J Palmer	6	3	7^{7}

Second round
(Czech Republic) M Damm (Germany) D Prinosil	7^{7}	3	6
(Australia) W Arthurs (Australia) A Kratzmann	6^{5}	6	4
WC	(United States) J Blake (United States) T Martin
(United States) B Bryan (United States) M Bryan	w/o
8	(South Africa) E Ferreira (United States) R Leach	2	4
(Argentina) M García (Czech Republic) C Suk	6	6
(Ecuador) N Lapentti (United States) J Tarango	4	7^{7}	7
2	(United States) D Johnson (United States) J Palmer	6	6^{3}	5

Quarterfinals
(Czech Republic) M Damm (Germany) D Prinosil	4	6	7^{8}
(United States) B Bryan (United States) M Bryan	6	3	6^{6}
(Argentina) M García (Czech Republic) C Suk	3	4
(Ecuador) N Lapentti (United States) J Tarango	6	6

Semifinals
(Czech Republic) M Damm (Germany) D Prinosil	2	7^{9}	7
(Ecuador) N Lapentti (United States) J Tarango	6	6^{7}	5
