= 2001 Eurocard Ladies German Open =

- Date: 7–13 May
- Edition: 90th
- Category: Tier I
- Draw: 56S / 28D
- Prize money: $1,185,000
- Surface: Clay / outdoor
- Location: Berlin, Germany
- Venue: Rot-Weiss Tennis Club

Champions

Singles
- (France) Amélie Mauresmo

Doubles
- (Belgium) Els Callens (United States) Meghann Shaughnessy
- WTA German Open

The 2001 Eurocard Ladies German Open was a women's tennis tournament played on outdoor clay courts at the Rot-Weiss Tennis Club in Berlin in Germany and was part of Tier I of the 2001 WTA Tour. It was the 90th edition of the tournament and ran from 7 May through 13 May 2001. Fourth-seeded Amélie Mauresmo won the singles title.

== Finals ==
=== Singles ===
(France) Amélie Mauresmo defeated (United States) Jennifer Capriati 6–4, 2–6, 6–3

- It was Mauresmo's 4th and last singles title of the year and the 6th of her career.

=== Doubles ===
(Belgium) Els Callens / (United States) Meghann Shaughnessy defeated (Zimbabwe) Cara Black / (Russia) Elena Likhovtseva 6–4, 6–3

- It was Callens' 1st title of the year and the 5th of her career. It was Shaughnessy's 1st title of the year and the 3rd of her career.

== Prize money ==
Event	W	F	SF	QF	Round of 16	Round of 32	Round of 64
Singles	$175,000	$89,000	$45,035	$22,600	$11,400	$5,800	$2,950
