= 2001 Swisscom Challenge – Singles =

Singles
- 2001 Swisscom Challenge

Final
- Champion: (United States) Lindsay Davenport
- Runner-up: (Federal Republic of Yugoslavia) Jelena Dokic
- Score: 6–3, 6–1

Details
- Draw: 28 (3WC/4Q/2LL)
- Seeds: 9

Events
| Singles | Doubles |
- Zurich Open

Lindsay Davenport defeated Jelena Dokic in the final, 6–3, 6–1 to win the singles tennis title at the 2001 Swisscom Challenge. It was the 6th title for Davenport during this season, after previously winning at Tokyo, Scottsdale, Eastbourne, Los Angeles and Filderstadt.

Martina Hingis was the reigning champion, but withdrew due to an ankle injury.

== Seeds ==
The top four seeds received a bye into the second round. Martina Hingis, the first seed, dropped out of the tournament. Her bye was given to number nine seed Sandrine Testud.

1. (Switzerland) ~~Martina Hingis~~ (withdrew due to an ankle injury)
2. (United States) Jennifer Capriati (semifinals)
3. (United States) Lindsay Davenport (champion)
4. (Federal Republic of Yugoslavia) Jelena Dokic (final)
5. (France) Nathalie Tauziat (semifinals)
6. (United States) Meghann Shaughnessy (first round)
7. (Russia) Elena Dementieva (first round)
8. (Italy) Silvia Farina Elia (quarterfinals)
9. (France) Sandrine Testud (quarterfinals)

== Draw ==
Key

- Q = Qualifier
- WC = Wild card
- LL = Lucky loser
- Alt = Alternate
- ITF = ITF entry
- PR = Protected ranking
- SR = Special ranking
- SE = Special exempt
- JE = Junior exempt
- JR = Junior Accelerator Programme entrant
- CO = College Accelerator Programme entrant
- NG = Next Gen Accelerator Program entrant
- w/o = Walkover
- r = Retired
- d = Defaulted

=== Finals ===
Semifinals
5 | (France) Nathalie Tauziat | 2 | 2
4 | (Federal Republic of Yugoslavia) Jelena Dokic | 6 | 6
3 | (United States) Lindsay Davenport | 6 | 5 | 6
2 | (United States) Jennifer Capriati | 1 | 7 | 2

Final
4 | (Federal Republic of Yugoslavia) Jelena Dokic | 3 | 1
3 | (United States) Lindsay Davenport | 6 | 6

=== Top half ===
First round
Q | (Croatia) I Majoli | 7^{7} | 6
(Spain) A Sánchez Vicario | 6^{5} | 2
WC | (Russia) L Krasnoroutskaya | 4 | 1
(Uzbekistan) I Tulyaganova | 6 | 6
(Bulgaria) M Maleeva | 6^{3} | 7^{8} | 3
5 | (France) N Tauziat | 7^{7} | 6^{6} | 6
(Spain) Á Montolio | 1 | 3
(United States) C Rubin | 6 | 6
(United States) L Raymond | 7^{7} | 6
LL | (United States) A Stevenson | 6^{4} | 3
(Germany) A Huber | 2 | 4
8 | (Italy) S Farina Elia | 6 | 6

Second round
9 | (France) S Testud | 7^{7} | 6
Q | (Croatia) I Majoli | 6^{1} | 4
(Uzbekistan) I Tulyaganova | 2 | 4
5 | (France) N Tauziat | 6 | 6
4 | (Federal Republic of Yugoslavia) J Dokic | 6 | 6
(United States) C Rubin | 4 | 4
(United States) L Raymond | 2 | 4
8 | (Italy) S Farina Elia | 6 | 6

Quarterfinals
9 | (France) S Testud | 6^{4} | 6^{4}
5 | (France) N Tauziat | 7^{7} | 7^{7}
4 | (Federal Republic of Yugoslavia) J Dokic | 6 | 7^{7}
8 | (Italy) S Farina Elia | 4 | 6^{3}

Semifinals
5 | (France) N Tauziat | 2 | 2
4 | (Federal Republic of Yugoslavia) J Dokic | 6 | 6

=== Bottom half ===
First round
6 | (United States) M Shaughnessy | 3 | 4
Q | (Slovakia) D Hantuchová | 6 | 6
(Austria) B Schett | 6 | 6
(Spain) M Serna | 1 | 2
(Russia) A Kournikova | 0 | 6 | 3
(South Africa) A Coetzer | 6 | 4 | 6
7 | (Russia) E Dementieva | 2 | 4
Q | (Switzerland) M-G Mikaelian | 6 | 6
Q | (Russia) T Panova | 6 | 6
LL | (Slovakia) J Husárová | 4 | 2
WC | (Russia) N Petrova | 6 | 6
WC | (Switzerland) P Schnyder | 2 | 0

Second round
Q | (Slovakia) D Hantuchová | 6 | 7^{7}
(Austria) B Schett | 1 | 6^{5}
(South Africa) A Coetzer | 3 | 4
3 | (United States) L Davenport | 6 | 6
Q | (Switzerland) M-G Mikaelian | 6 | 6
Q | (Russia) T Panova | 1 | 3
WC | (Russia) N Petrova | 3 | 6 | 2
2 | (United States) J Capriati | 6 | 3 | 6

Quarterfinals
Q | (Slovakia) D Hantuchová | 6 | 1 | 1
3 | (United States) L Davenport | 3 | 6 | 6
Q | (Switzerland) M-G Mikaelian | 4 | 2
2 | (United States) J Capriati | 6 | 6

Semifinals
3 | (United States) L Davenport | 6 | 5 | 6
2 | (United States) J Capriati | 1 | 7 | 2

== Qualifying ==
=== Qualifying seeds ===
1. (Croatia) Iva Majoli (qualified)
2. (Russia) Tatiana Panova (qualified)
3. (Russia) Anastasia Myskina (first round)
4. (Slovakia) Daniela Hantuchová (qualified)
5. (Germany) Jana Kandarr (second round)
6. (France) Virginie Razzano (first round)
7. (Slovakia) Janette Husárová (qualifying competition, lucky loser)
8. (United States) Alexandra Stevenson (qualifying competition, lucky loser)

=== Qualifiers ===
1. (Croatia) Iva Majoli
2. (Russia) Tatiana Panova
3. (Switzerland) Marie-Gaïané Mikaelian
4. (Slovakia) Daniela Hantuchová

=== Lucky losers ===
1. (Slovakia) Janette Husárová
2. (United States) Alexandra Stevenson

=== Qualifying draw ===
==== First qualifier ====
First round
1 | (Croatia) Iva Majoli | 6 | 6
(Germany) Anca Barna | 3 | 3
(Germany) Julia Schruff | 6 | 4 | 4
(Netherlands) Miriam Oremans | 1 | 6 | 6
(Belgium) Els Callens | 6 | 6
(Germany) Gabrielle Kučerová | 2 | 3
(United States) Jill Craybas | 1 | 2
8 | (United States) Alexandra Stevenson | 6 | 6

Second round
1 | (Croatia) Iva Majoli | 6 | 7
(Netherlands) Miriam Oremans | 4 | 5
(Belgium) Els Callens | 0 | 0
8 | (United States) Alexandra Stevenson | 6 | 6

Qualifying competition
1 | (Croatia) Iva Majoli | 6^{5} | 7 | 6
8 | (United States) Alexandra Stevenson | 7^{7} | 5 | 3

==== Second qualifier ====
First round
2 | (Russia) Tatiana Panova | 6 | 6
(France) Anne-Gaëlle Sidot | 3 | 3
(Italy) Maria Elena Camerin | 1 | 6 | 7^{7}
(France) Camille Pin | 6 | 3 | 6^{2}
(Italy) Roberta Vinci | 6 | 6
(United Kingdom) Lucie Ahl | 3 | 2
(France) Laurence Andretto | 2 | 3
7 | (Slovakia) Janette Husárová | 6 | 6

Second round
2 | (Russia) Tatiana Panova | 4 | 6 | 6
(Italy) Maria Elena Camerin | 6 | 2 | 1
(Italy) Roberta Vinci | 4 | 2
7 | (Slovakia) Janette Husárová | 6 | 6

Qualifying competition
2 | (Russia) Tatiana Panova | 6 | 6
7 | (Slovakia) Janette Husárová | 3 | 4

==== Third qualifier ====
First round
3 | (Russia) Anastasia Myskina | 7 | 4 | 6^{4}
(Switzerland) Myriam Casanova | 5 | 6 | 7^{7}
(Switzerland) Marie-Gaïané Mikaelian | 6 | 6
(Slovenia) Tina Pisnik | 3 | 2
(Slovenia) Maja Matevžič | 6 | 6
WC | (Switzerland) Michelle Giang | 1 | 0
(Slovakia) Karina Habšudová | 7 | 6
6 | (France) Virginie Razzano | 5 | 4

Second round
(Switzerland) Myriam Casanova | 6 | 4 | 3
(Switzerland) Marie-Gaïané Mikaelian | 0 | 6 | 6
(Slovenia) Maja Matevžič | 6 | 2 | 7^{7}
(Slovakia) Karina Habšudová | 4 | 6 | 6^{5}

Qualifying competition
(Switzerland) Marie-Gaïané Mikaelian | 7 | 6
(Slovenia) Maja Matevžič | 5 | 4

==== Fourth qualifier ====
First round
4 | (Slovakia) Daniela Hantuchová | 6 | 6
WC | (Switzerland) Daniela Casanova | 1 | 4
(Tunisia) Selima Sfar | 2 | 6 | 6
Alt | (Germany) Denise Hofer | 6 | 4 | 2
WC | (Argentina) María Emilia Salerni | 3 | 1
(Sweden) Åsa Carlsson | 6 | 6
WC | (Switzerland) Aliénor Tricerri | 4 | 3
5 | (Germany) Jana Kandarr | 6 | 6

Second round
4 | (Slovakia) Daniela Hantuchová | 6 | 6
(Tunisia) Selima Sfar | 3 | 4
(Sweden) Åsa Carlsson | 6 | 6
5 | (Germany) Jana Kandarr | 2 | 2

Qualifying competition
4 | (Slovakia) Daniela Hantuchová | 3 | 6 | 6
(Sweden) Åsa Carlsson | 6 | 2 | 2
