= 2001 Eurocard Ladies German Open – Singles =

Singles
- 2001 Eurocard Ladies German Open

Final
- Champion: (France) Amélie Mauresmo
- Runner-up: (United States) Jennifer Capriati
- Score: 6–4, 2–6, 6–3

Details
- Draw: 56 (4WC/12Q)
- Seeds: 17

Events
Singles	Doubles
← 2000 ·	German Open	· 2002 →

Amélie Mauresmo defeated Jennifer Capriati in the final, 6–4, 2–6, 6–3 to win the singles tennis title at the 2001 WTA German Open.

Conchita Martínez was the reigning champion, but lost in the quarterfinals to Capriati.

== Seeds ==
A champion seed is indicated in bold text while text in italics indicates the round in which that seed was eliminated. The top eight seeds received a bye to the second round.

1. (Switzerland) Martina Hingis (semifinals)
2. (United States) Venus Williams (third round)
3. (United States) Jennifer Capriati (final)
4. (France) **Amélie Mauresmo (champion)**
5. (South Africa) Amanda Coetzer (quarterfinals)
6. (Spain) Conchita Martínez (quarterfinals)
7. (France) Nathalie Tauziat (second round)
8. (Spain) Arantxa Sánchez-Vicario (quarterfinals)
9. (Bulgaria) Magdalena Maleeva (second round)
10. (Belgium) Kim Clijsters (first round)
11. (France) ~~Mary Pierce~~ (withdrew)
12. (United States) Chanda Rubin (first round)
13. (Belgium) Justine Henin (semifinals)
14. (France) Sandrine Testud (third round)
15. (Spain) Magüi Serna (second round)
16. (Austria) Barbara Schett (second round)
17. (United States) Meghann Shaughnessy (third round)

== Draw ==
=== Key ===
- Q = Qualifier
- WC = Wild card
- LL = Lucky loser
- Alt = Alternate
- SE = Special exempt
- PR = Protected ranking
- ITF = ITF entry
- JE = Junior exempt
- w/o = Walkover
- r = Retired
- d = Defaulted
- SR = Special ranking

=== Finals ===
Semifinals
1	(Switzerland) Martina Hingis	**6**	0	4
4	(France) **Amélie Mauresmo**	2	**6**	**6**
3	(United States) **Jennifer Capriati**	**6**	4	2
13	(Belgium) Justine Henin	2	**6**	1^{r}

Final
4	(France) **Amélie Mauresmo**	**6**	2	**6**
3	(United States) Jennifer Capriati	4	**6**	3

=== Top half ===
==== Section 1 ====
First round
(Italy) **T Garbin**	**6**	**6**
(United States) L Osterloh	3	1
Q	(Spain) V Ruano Pascual	3	1
(France) **N Dechy**	**6**	**6**
(Russia) T Panova	4	2
15	(Spain) **M Serna**	**6**	**6**
10	(Belgium) K Clijsters	2	1
(Luxembourg) **A Kremer**	**6**	**6**
Q	(Italy) G Pizzichini	0	5
Q	(Slovakia) **Ľ Cervanová**	**6**	**7**
(Japan) **A Sugiyama**	**6**	**6**
(Italy) R Grande	3	4

Second round
1	(Switzerland) **M Hingis**	**6**	**6**
(Italy) T Garbin	2	3
(France) **N Dechy**	**7^{7}**	**6**
15	(Spain) M Serna	6^{5}	2
(Luxembourg) A Kremer	**6**	3	4
Q	(Slovakia) **Ľ Cervanová**	1	**6**	**6**
(Japan) A Sugiyama	3	3
8	(Spain) **A Sánchez-Vicario**	**6**	**6**

Third round
1	(Switzerland) **M Hingis**	**6**	**6**
(France) N Dechy	3	1
Q	(Slovakia) Ľ Cervanová	3	**6**	3
8	(Spain) **A Sánchez-Vicario**	**6**	1	**6**

Quarterfinals
1	(Switzerland) **M Hingis**	**6**	**7^{7}**
8	(Spain) A Sánchez-Vicario	3	6^{4}

==== Section 2 ====
First round
(Romania) R Dragomir Ilie	1	5
(Croatia) **I Majoli**	**6**	**7**
WC	(Germany) B Lamade	5	5
(Switzerland) **P Schnyder**	**7**	**7**
Q	(Sweden) Å Carlsson	1	**6**	5
16	(Austria) **B Schett**	**6**	3	**7**
17	(United States) **M Shaughnessy**	**6**	**6**
(Russia) E Likhovtseva	1	4
WC	(United States) C Morariu	5	1	r
(Spain) **M Marrero**	**7**	**2**
(United States) M Tu	**6**	3	3
(Spain) **G León García**	3	**6**	**6**

Second round
4	(France) **A Mauresmo**	**6**	**6**
(Croatia) I Majoli	3	1
(Switzerland) **P Schnyder**	2	**6**	**6**
16	(Austria) B Schett	**6**	4	4
17	(United States) **M Shaughnessy**	**6**	**3**
(Spain) M Marrero	0	0	r
(Spain) G León García	5	**6**	1
5	(South Africa) **A Coetzer**	**7**	1	**6**

Third round
4	(France) **A Mauresmo**	**6**	4	**6**
(Switzerland) P Schnyder	1	**6**	0
17	(United States) M Shaughnessy	3	6^{1}
5	(South Africa) **A Coetzer**	**6**	**7^{7}**

Quarterfinals
4	(France) **A Mauresmo**	6^{5}	**6**	**6**
5	(South Africa) A Coetzer	**7^{7}**	3	3

=== Bottom half ===
==== Section 3 ====
First round
(France) A-G Sidot	1	4
Q	(Germany) **M Müller**	**6**	**6**
Q	(Belarus) T Poutchek	1	1
(Argentina) **P Suárez**	**6**	**6**
(Czech Republic) K Hrdličková	3	**6**	2
9	(Bulgaria) **M Maleeva**	**6**	1	**6**
14	(France) **S Testud**	**7^{7}**	**6**
(Germany) M Weingärtner	6^{4}	2
(Spain) **Á Montolio**	**7^{7}**	**6**
(United States) K Brandi	6^{3}	3
(Federal Republic of Yugoslavia) **J Dokić**	**6**	3	**6**
(Zimbabwe) C Black	2	**6**	4

Second round
6	(Spain) **C Martínez**	**6**	3	**7^{9}**
Q	(Germany) M Müller	3	**6**	6^{7}
(Argentina) **P Suárez**	**6**	**6**
9	(Bulgaria) M Maleeva	4	1
14	(France) **S Testud**	**6**	4	**6**
(Spain) Á Montolio	2	**6**	3
(Federal Republic of Yugoslavia) J Dokić	5	**6**	4
3	(United States) **J Capriati**	**7**	3	**6**

Third round
6	(Spain) **C Martínez**	**7^{7}**	**6**
(Argentina) P Suárez	6^{3}	0
14	(France) S Testud	2	6^{6}
3	(United States) **J Capriati**	**6**	**7^{8}**

Quarterfinals
6	(Spain) C Martínez	**6**	3	4
3	(United States) **J Capriati**	2	**6**	**6**

==== Section 4 ====
First round
Q	(Italy) F Schiavone	5	1
WC	(Germany) **M Schnitzer**	**7**	**6**
Q	(United States) J Craybas	0	**7**	1
(Italy) **S Farina Elia**	**6**	5	**6**
Q	(Czech Republic) **D Chládková**	4	**6**	**6**
12	(United States) C Rubin	**6**	4	4
13	(Belgium) **J Henin**	4	**6**	**6**
(South Africa) J Kruger	**6**	2	2
Q	(Netherlands) M Oremans	**6**	3	4
Q	(Germany) **J Kandarr**	1	**6**	**6**
WC	(Germany) S Schmidle	2	3
Q	(Slovakia) **K Habšudová**	**6**	**6**

Second round
7	(France) N Tauziat	**6**	5	5
WC	(Germany) **M Schnitzer**	4	**7**	**7**
(Italy) S Farina Elia	2	0	r
(Czech Republic) **D Chládková**	**6**	**1**
13	(Belgium) **J Henin**	**6**	**7^{8}**
Q	(Germany) J Kandarr	1	6^{6}
Q	(Slovakia) K Habšudová	3	3
2	(United States) **V Williams**	**6**	**6**

Third round
WC	(Germany) **M Schnitzer**	**7**	**6**
(Czech Republic) D Chládková	5	3
13	(Belgium) **J Henin**	**6**	**6**
2	(United States) V Williams	1	4

Quarterfinals
WC	(Germany) M Schnitzer	4	2
13	(Belgium) **J Henin**	**6**	**6**

== Qualifying ==
=== Qualifying seeds ===
1. (Czech Republic) **Denisa Chládková (qualified)**
2. (Germany) **Jana Kandarr (qualified)**
3. (United States) Jennifer Hopkins (qualifying competition)
4. (Paraguay) Rossana de los Ríos (first round)
5. (Germany) ~~Barbara Rittner~~ (withdrew)
6. (Spain) **Virginia Ruano Pascual (qualified)**
7. (Sweden) **Åsa Carlsson (qualified)**
8. (Russia) Anastasia Myskina (first round)
9. (New Zealand) Pavlina Nola (qualifying competition)
10. (Italy) **Francesca Schiavone (qualified)**
11. (Netherlands) **Miriam Oremans (qualified)**
12. (Germany) Andrea Glass (first round)
13. (Bulgaria) Lubomira Bacheva (qualifying competition)
14. (Slovakia) Daniela Hantuchová (qualifying competition)
15. (France) Émilie Loit (first round)
16. (Slovakia) **Ľudmila Cervanová (qualified)**
17. (Slovakia) Janette Husárová (qualifying competition, withdrew)
18. (Belarus) **Tatiana Poutchek (qualified)**
19. (Switzerland) Miroslava Vavrinec (first round)
20. (United States) **Jill Craybas (qualified)**
21. (Austria) Sylvia Plischke (first round)
22. (Switzerland) Emmanuelle Gagliardi (first round, retired)
23. (Canada) Jana Nejedly (first round)
24. (Spain) Nuria Llagostera Vives (qualifying competition)

=== Qualifiers ===
1. **(Czech Republic) Denisa Chládková**
2. **(Germany) Jana Kandarr**
3. **(Belarus) Tatiana Poutchek**
4. **(Germany) Martina Müller**
5. **(Slovakia) Karina Habšudová**
6. **(Spain) Virginia Ruano Pascual**
7. **(Sweden) Åsa Carlsson**
8. **(Italy) Gloria Pizzichini**
9. **(United States) Jill Craybas**
10. **(Italy) Francesca Schiavone**
11. **(Netherlands) Miriam Oremans**
12. **(Slovakia) Ľudmila Cervanová**

=== Qualifying draw ===
==== First qualifier ====
First round				Qualifying competition
1	**(Czech Republic) Denisa Chládková**	**6**	**6**
WC	(Germany) Stefanie Gehrrien	4	1	1	**(Czech Republic) Denisa Chládková**	**7^{7}**	**6**
	**(Netherlands) Seda Noorlander**	**6**	4		(Netherlands) Seda Noorlander	6^{0}	2
22	(Switzerland) Emmanuelle Gagliardi	4	1^{r}

==== Second qualifier ====
First round					Qualifying competition
2	**(Germany) Jana Kandarr**	**6**	2	**7^{9}**
	(Netherlands) Kristie Boogert	3	**6**	6^{7}	2	**(Germany) Jana Kandarr**	2	**6**	**6**
	(Belarus) Nadejda Ostrovskaya	4	**6**	2	24	(Spain) Nuria Llagostera Vives	**6**	4	3
24	**(Spain) Nuria Llagostera Vives**	**6**	3	**6**

==== Third qualifier ====
First round				Qualifying competition
3	**(United States) Jennifer Hopkins**	**6**	**7**
	(Tunisia) Selima Sfar	3	5	3	(United States) Jennifer Hopkins	2	3
	(Federal Republic of Yugoslavia) Sandra Načuk	6^{5}	2	18	**(Belarus) Tatiana Poutchek**	**6**	**6**
18	**(Belarus) Tatiana Poutchek**	**7^{7}**	**6**

==== Fourth qualifier ====
First round				Qualifying competition
4	(Paraguay) Rossana de los Ríos	0	4
WC	**(Germany) Vanessa Henke**	**6**	**6**	WC	(Germany) Vanessa Henke	**6**	2	1
WC	**(Germany) Martina Müller**	**7^{7}**	**6**	WC	**(Germany) Martina Müller**	4	**6**	**6**
23	(Canada) Jana Nejedly	6^{4}	4

==== Fifth qualifier ====
First round				Qualifying competition
Alt	(Germany) Angelika Rösch	5	1
	**(Slovakia) Karina Habšudová**	**7**	**6**	**(Slovakia) Karina Habšudová**	**6**	**7^{8}**
	**(Germany) Anca Barna**	**6**	**6**	(Germany) Anca Barna	3	6^{6}
21	(Austria) Sylvia Plischke	4	3

==== Sixth qualifier ====
First round				Qualifying competition
6	**(Spain) Virginia Ruano Pascual**	**6**	**6**
	(Slovenia) Katarina Srebotnik	0	1	6	**(Spain) Virginia Ruano Pascual**	**6**	**6**
WC	**(Germany) Sandra Klösel**	**6**	**6**	WC	(Germany) Sandra Klösel	3	2
15	(France) Émilie Loit	4	2

==== Seventh qualifier ====
First round					Qualifying competition
7	**(Sweden) Åsa Carlsson**	**6**	**6**
WC	(Germany) Nina Dübbers	3	3		7	**(Sweden) Åsa Carlsson**	**6**	**6**
	(France) Alexandra Fusai	1	**7^{7}**	6^{8}	13	(Bulgaria) Lubomira Bacheva	2	1
13	**(Bulgaria) Lubomira Bacheva**	**6**	6^{5}	**7^{10}**

==== Eighth qualifier ====
First round					Qualifying competition
8	(Russia) Anastasia Myskina	4	**6**	4
	**(Italy) Gloria Pizzichini**	**6**	4	**6**		**(Italy) Gloria Pizzichini**	w/o
WC	(Germany) Adriana Jerabek	4	3		17	(Slovakia) Janette Husárová
17	**(Slovakia) Janette Husárová**	**6**	**6**

==== Ninth qualifier ====
First round					Qualifying competition
9	**(New Zealand) Pavlina Nola**	**6**	**6**
	(Belgium) Els Callens	4	4		9	(New Zealand) Pavlina Nola	6^{3}	1
	(Italy) Giulia Casoni	**6**	6^{2}	6^{6}	20	**(United States) Jill Craybas**	**7^{7}**	**6**
20	**(United States) Jill Craybas**	3	**7^{7}**	**7^{8}**

==== Tenth qualifier ====
First round				Qualifying competition
10	**(Italy) Francesca Schiavone**	**7**	**6**
	(Spain) Gisela Riera	5	2	10	**(Italy) Francesca Schiavone**	**7**	**7^{9}**
	(Slovakia) Martina Suchá	6^{4}	3	14	(Slovakia) Daniela Hantuchová	5	6^{7}
14	**(Slovakia) Daniela Hantuchová**	**7^{7}**	**6**

==== Eleventh qualifier ====
First round				Qualifying competition
11	**(Netherlands) Miriam Oremans**	**6**	**6**
	(Czech Republic) Eva Martincová	2	0	11	**(Netherlands) Miriam Oremans**	**7^{7}**	**7**
	**(Netherlands) Amanda Hopmans**	**6**	**6**		(Netherlands) Amanda Hopmans	6^{5}	5
19	(Switzerland) Miroslava Vavrinec	3	0

==== Twelfth qualifier ====
First round					Qualifying competition
12	(Germany) Andrea Glass	**7**	4	6^{5}
	**(Germany) Gréta Arn**	5	**6**	**7^{7}**		(Germany) Gréta Arn	4	2
	(Czech Republic) Sandra Kleinová	4	1		16	**(Slovakia) Ľudmila Cervanová**	**6**	**6**
16	**(Slovakia) Ľudmila Cervanová**	**6**	**6**
